= 2017 Terengganu FA season =

Terengganu
2017 season
- President: Ahmad Razif Abdul Rahman
- Head Coach: Irfan Bakti Abu Salim
- Stadium: Sultan Ismail Nasiruddin Shah Stadium
- Liga Premier: 2nd (promoted)
- Piala FA: Semi-finals
- Piala Malaysia: Group stage
- Top goalscorer: League: Kipré Tchétché (9); All: Kipré Tchétché (12)
- Highest home attendance: 9,000 vs Johor Darul Ta'zim II (30 June 2017)
- Lowest home attendance: 543 vs Sarawak (9 September 2017)
- Average home league attendance: 4,730
| Home colours | Away colours |

The 2017 season was Terengganu's 1st season in Liga Premier since relegated in 2016 season.

== Coaching staff ==
| Position | Staff |
|---|---|
| Manager | (Malaysia) Marzuki Sulong |
| Head coach | (Malaysia) Irfan Bakti Abu Salim |
| Assistant coach | (Malaysia) Mohd Nafuzi Mohd Zain |
| Coach | (Malaysia) Kamaruddin Annuar |
| Fitness coach | (Malaysia) Muhammad Afeeq Aqmal Noorazmi |
| Goalkeeping coach | (Malaysia) Mohd Yazid Mohd Yassin |
| Head physiotherapist | (Malaysia) Zulkifli Mohd Zin |
| Team doctor | (Malaysia) Dr. Lee Leong Tiong |
| Under-21 Manager | (Malaysia) Jasmira Othman |
| Under-21 Assistant Manager | (Malaysia) Mohd Rashidi Hamat |
| Under-21 Head Coach | (Malaysia) Mustaffa Kamal Abdul Wahab |
| Under-21 Assistant Coach | (Malaysia) Wan Adremy Indera Wan Adnan |
| Under-21 Goalkeeping coach | (Malaysia) Zubir Ibrahim |
| Under-21 Fitness coach | (Malaysia) Mohd Noruddin Abdul Manaf |
| Under-21 Physio | (Malaysia) Marzuki Abdullah |
| Under-19 Manager | (Malaysia) Wan Zaulkifli Wan Gati |
| Under-19 Assistant Manager | (Malaysia) Che Wan Mohd Azlizan Che Wan Abu Bakar |
| Under-19 Head Coach | (Malaysia) Subri Sulong |
| Under-19 Assistant Coach | (Malaysia) Abdul Jalal Abdul Wahid |
| Under-19 Goalkeeping coach | (Malaysia) Mohd Yusran Mat Sharif |
| Under-19 Physio | (Malaysia) Tun Saiful Ridzuan Razali |

== Squad information ==
=== First-team squad ===
As of 26 September 2017.

| No. | Name | Nat | Position | Since | Date of Birth (Age) | Signed from |
Goalkeepers
| 1 | Syazwan Yusoff | (Malaysia) | GK | 2017 | 17 April 1992 (age 34) | (Malaysia) Kelantan |
| 24 | Amierul Hakimi Awang | (Malaysia) | GK | 2016 | 15 January 1995 (age 31) | Youth |
| 26 | Mohamad Faizal Yusoff | (Malaysia) | GK | 2017 | 25 April 1987 (age 39) | (Malaysia) Sungai Ara |
| 29 | Suffian Abdul Rahman | (Malaysia) | GK | 2017 | 23 February 1978 (age 48) | Unattached |
Defenders
| 2 | Adam Othman Arfah | (Malaysia) | DF | 2017 | 5 March 1993 (age 33) | (Malaysia) UKM |
| 3 | Radhi Yusof | (Malaysia) | DF | 2017 | 11 February 1993 (age 33) | Youth |
| 4 | Izuan Jarudin | (Malaysia) | CB | 2017 | 4 July 1985 (age 41) | (Malaysia) Perlis |
| 5 | Lázaro | (Brazil) | CB | 2017 | 28 June 1990 (age 36) | (Bahrain) Manama Club |
| 17 | Nasrullah Haniff | (Malaysia) | CB | 2017 | 25 June 1990 (age 36) | (Malaysia) DRB-Hicom |
| 19 | Firdaus Faudzi | (Malaysia) | RB | 2017 | 2 August 1987 (age 39) | (Malaysia) Felda United |
| 22 | Adib Aizuddin Abdul Latif | (Malaysia) | LB | 2017 | 23 January 1986 (age 40) | (Malaysia) Felda United |
Midfielders
| 6 | Abdul Shukur Jusoh | (Malaysia) | AM / RW | 2017 | 28 February 1989 (age 37) | (Malaysia) Felda United |
| 7 | Partiban Janasekaran | (Malaysia) | LM / LW | 2017 | 28 November 1992 (age 33) | (Malaysia) Sarawak |
| 8 | Gabriel Davis Dos Santos | (Brazil) | AM / SS | 2017 | 23 October 1989 (age 37) | (Brazil) Lajeadense |
| 11 | Issey Nakajima-Farran | (Canada) | RW / LW / AM | 2015 | 16 May 1984 (age 42) | Unattached |
| 12 | Ezaidy Khadar | (Malaysia) | AM / RW | 2017 | 17 January 1983 (age 43) | (Malaysia) Perlis |
| 13 | Abdul Latiff Suhaimi | (Malaysia) | AM / CF | 2017 | 29 May 1989 (age 37) | (Malaysia) PDRM |
| 15 | Faiz Nasir | (Malaysia) | AM / CM / RW | 2017 | 21 July 1992 (age 34) | (Malaysia) Felcra FC |
| 16 | Hafizal Mohamad | (Malaysia) | MF | 2014 | 20 January 1993 (age 33) | Youth |
| 20 | Ridzuan Abdunloh | (Malaysia) | RW / LW / SS | 2017 | 23 February 1994 (age 32) | (Malaysia) Felda United |
| 21 | Hazeman Abdul Karim | (Malaysia) | LW / CM / DM | 2017 | 1 October 1989 (age 37) | (Malaysia) Felcra FC |
| 27 | Ismail Faruqi | (Malaysia) | AM / CM | 2011 | 15 October 1986 (age 40) | (Malaysia) T-Team |
| 28 | Azi Shahril Azmi | (Malaysia) | CM DM | 2017 | 20 September 1985 (age 41) | (Malaysia) Felcra FC |
| 31 | Dhiyaulrahman Hasry | (Malaysia) | LM / LW | 2017 | 27 July 1996 (age 30) | Youth |
Forwards
| 9 | Amirul Syahmi | (Malaysia) | ST | 2015 | 9 June 1994 (age 32) | Youth |
| 10 | Ferris Danial | (Malaysia) | ST | 2017 | 21 August 1992 (age 34) | (Malaysia) Felda United |
| 23 | Kipré Tchétché | (Ivory Coast) | ST | 2017 | 16 December 1987 (age 38) | (Oman) Al-Suwaiq |

== Transfers ==
First transfer window started in December 2017 to 22 January 2017 and second transfer window started on 15 May 2017 to 11 June 2017.

=== In ===
==== December to January ====
| No. | Pos | Player | Transferred From | Date | Source |
|---|---|---|---|---|---|
| 1 | GK | (Malaysia) Syazwan Yusoff | (Malaysia) Kelantan | November 2016 | |
| – | DF | (Malaysia) Ezzrul Ikmanizar Abdul Rahman | (Malaysia) Kangar FC | November 2016 | |
| 17 | DF | (Malaysia) Nasrullah Haniff | (Malaysia) DRB-Hicom | November 2016 | |
| 22 | DF | (Malaysia) Adib Aizuddin Abdul Latif | (Malaysia) Felda United | November 2016 | |
| 19 | DF | (Malaysia) Mohd Firdaus Faudzi | (Malaysia) Felda United | November 2016 | |
| 4 | DF | (Malaysia) Mohd Izuan Jarudin | (Malaysia) Perlis | November 2016 | |
| – | MF | (Malaysia) Mohd Asrol Ibrahim | (Malaysia) T-Team | November 2016 | |
| 6 | MF | (Malaysia) Abdul Shukur Jusoh | (Malaysia) Felda United | November 2016 | |
| 13 | MF | (Malaysia) Abdul Latiff Suhaimi | (Malaysia) PDRM | November 2016 | |
| 15 | MF | (Malaysia) Faiz Nasir | (Malaysia) Felcra FC | November 2016 | |
| 12 | MF | (Malaysia) Mohd Ezaidy Khadar | (Malaysia) Perlis | November 2016 | |
| 7 | MF | (Malaysia) J. Partiban | (Malaysia) Sarawak | December 2016 | |
| 21 | MF | (Malaysia) Mohd Hazeman Abdul Karim | (Malaysia) Felcra FC | December 2016 | |
| 10 | FW | (Malaysia) Mohd Ferris Danial | (Malaysia) Felda United | December 2016 | |
| – | FW | (Argentina) Federico Falcone | (Malta) Valletta | 1 January 2017 | |
| 5 | DF | (Brazil) Lázaro | (Bahrain) Manama Club | 12 January 2017 | |
| – | DF | (Uzbekistan) Lutfulla Turaev | (Malaysia) Felda United | 12 January 2017 | |
| 29 | GK | (Malaysia) Mohd Suffian Abdul Rahman | Unattached | 20 February 2017 | |

==== May to June ====
| No. | Pos | Player | Transferred From | Date | Source |
|---|---|---|---|---|---|
| 26 | GK | (Malaysia) Mohamad Faizal Yusoff | (Malaysia) Sungai Ara | June 2017 | |
| 8 | MF | (Brazil) Gabriel Davis | (Brazil) Tupi | July 2017 | |
| 23 | FW | (Ivory Coast) Tchetche Hermann Brice Kipre | (Oman) Al-Suwaiq | July 2017 | |
| 20 | MF | (Malaysia) Ridzuan Abdunloh Pula | (Malaysia) Felda United | July 2017 | |
| 28 | MF | (Malaysia) Azi Shahril Azmi | (Malaysia) Felcra FC | July 2017 | |

=== Out ===
==== December to January ====
| No. | Pos | Player | Transferred To | Date | Source |
|---|---|---|---|---|---|
| – | GK | (Malaysia) Shamirza Yusoff | Unattached | November 2016 | |
| – | GK | (Malaysia) Mohd Suhaimi Husin | (Malaysia) T-Team | November 2016 | |
| – | DF | (Cameroon) Vincent Bikana | Unattached | November 2016 | |
| – | DF | (Malaysia) Yong Kuong Yong | (Malaysia) Penang | November 2016 | |
| – | DF | (Malaysia) Hasmizan Kamarodin | (Malaysia) Kelantan | November 2016 | |
| – | DF | (Malaysia) Nasril Izzat Jalil | (Malaysia) PDRM | November 2016 | |
| – | DF | (Malaysia) Zubir Azmi | (Malaysia) Pahang | November 2016 | |
| – | MF | (Malaysia) Zairo Anuar | (Malaysia) Terengganu City | November 2016 | |
| – | MF | (Malaysia) Ahmad Nordin Alias | (Malaysia) Pahang | November 2016 | |
| – | MF | (Malaysia) Joseph Kalang Tie | (Malaysia) Pahang | November 2016 | |
| – | MF | (Malaysia) Affize Faisal Mamat | (Malaysia) PKNS | November 2016 | |
| – | FW | (Montenegro) Bogdan Milić | (Iran) Saipa | November 2016 | |
| – | FW | (Malaysia) Hairuddin Omar | Retired | November 2016 | |
| – | FW | (Malaysia) Ashari Samsudin | (Malaysia) Pahang | November 2016 | |
| – | FW | (Malaysia) Mohd Naim Asraff Nordin | (Malaysia) PJ Rangers | November 2016 | |
| – | FW | (Malaysia) Mohd Hasrolsyawal Hamid | (Malaysia) Sime Darby | December 2016 | |
| – | MF | (Malaysia) Mohd Fakhrurazi Musa | (Malaysia) T-Team | December 2016 | |
| – | GK | (Malaysia) Sharbinee Allawee | Unattached | 20 February 2017 | |

==== June to July ====
| No. | Pos | Player | Transferred To | Date | Source |
|---|---|---|---|---|---|
| – | DF | (Malaysia) Ezzrul Ikmanizar Abd Rahman | Unattached | June 2017 | |
| – | MF | (Malaysia) Mohd Asrol Ibrahim | (Malaysia) T-Team | 7 June 2017 | |
| – | MF | (Uzbekistan) Lutfulla Turaev | (Uzbekistan) Olmaliq FK | 9 July 2017 | |
| – | FW | (Argentina) Federico Falcone | (Portugal) Aves | 1 July 2017 | |

== Competitions ==
=== Liga Premier ===
==== League table ====
| Pos | Team | Pld | W | D | L | GF | GA | GD | Pts | Promotion, qualification or relegation |
|---|---|---|---|---|---|---|---|---|---|---|
| 1 | Kuala Lumpur | 22 | 15 | 2 | 5 | 47 | 24 | +23 | 47 | Promotion to Super League |
| 2 | Terengganu | 22 | 15 | 2 | 5 | 42 | 27 | +15 | 47 | Promotion to Super League |
| 3 | PKNP | 22 | 14 | 4 | 4 | 41 | 23 | +18 | 46 | Promotion to Super League |
| 4 | Johor Darul Ta'zim II | 22 | 11 | 8 | 3 | 47 | 27 | +20 | 41 | |
| 5 | Negeri Sembilan | 22 | 11 | 8 | 3 | 37 | 24 | +13 | 41 | Promotion to Super League |

Source: FAM, FMLLP
Rules for classification: 1) Points; 2) Goal difference; 3) Number of goals scored.

==== Result summary ====
| Overall | | | | | | | | Home | | | | | | Away | | | | | |
| Pld | W | D | L | GF | GA | GD | Pts | W | D | L | GF | GA | GD | W | D | L | GF | GA | GD |
|---|---|---|---|---|---|---|---|---|---|---|---|---|---|---|---|---|---|---|---|
| 22 | 15 | 2 | 5 | 42 | 27 | +15 | 47 | 8 | 2 | 1 | 22 | 11 | +11 | 7 | 0 | 4 | 20 | 16 | +4 |

Last updated: 27 October 2017.
Source: Soccerway

==== Results by matchday ====
| Matchday | 1 | 2 | 3 | 4 | 5 | 6 | 7 | 8 | 9 | 10 | 11 | 12 | 13 | 14 | 15 | 16 | 17 | 18 | 19 | 20 | 21 | 22 |
|---|---|---|---|---|---|---|---|---|---|---|---|---|---|---|---|---|---|---|---|---|---|---|
| Ground | H | H | H | A | H | H | A | H | H | A | A | A | H | H | A | H | A | H | A | A | A | A |
| Result | W | W | W | L | L | W | W | W | W | L | W | L | W | D | W | W | W | D | W | W | W | L |
| Position | 6 | 7 | 4 | 2 | 3 | 3 | 2 | 2 | 2 | 3 | 2 | 3 | 2 | 4 | 4 | 2 | 1 | 2 | 2 | 2 | 2 | 2 |

Updated to match(es) played on 27 October 2017. Source: Soccerway
A = Away; H = Home; W = Win; D = Draw; L = Loss

==== Matches ====
Win Draw Loss

| 27 January 2017 1 | Terengganu | 1–0 | PDRM | Kuala Terengganu, Terengganu |
| 21:00 UTC+8 | Sharin 34' (yellow card) 51'; Turaev (yellow card) 74'; Adib (yellow card) 86' | SPMB Report; StadiumAstro Report | Nazri (yellow card) 23'; Konaté (yellow card) 70'; Afiq (yellow card) 71' | Stadium: Sultan Ismail Nasiruddin Shah Stadium; Attendance: 5,000; Referee: Suresh Jayaraman |

| 3 February 2017 2 | Terengganu | 2–1 | MISC-MIFA | Kuala Terengganu, Terengganu |
| 21:00 UTC+8 | Turaev 46', 62'; Nakajima-Farran (yellow card) 48' | | Nanthakumar (yellow card) 54'; Chukwubunna 79' | Stadium: Sultan Ismail Nasiruddin Shah Stadium; Attendance: 4,670; Referee: Ku Alauddin Ku Muhammad |

| 10 February 2017 3 | Terengganu | 2–0 | Kuantan | Kuala Terengganu, Terengganu |
| 21:00 UTC+8 | Lázaro (yellow card) 22'; Nakajima-Farran 48'; Latiff 62' | Report | Norfahmie (yellow card) 61' | Stadium: Sultan Ismail Nasiruddin Shah Stadium; Attendance: 5,890; Referee: Zulkarnain Zakaria |

| 17 February 2017 4 | Negeri Sembilan | 3–2 | Terengganu | Paroi, Negeri Sembilan |
| 21:00 UTC+8 | Suzuki 24'; Šimić 28'; Nasriq (yellow card) 40'; Faizal (yellow card) 67'; Tuck (yellow card) 70' | | Firdaus (yellow card) 14'; Latiff (yellow card) 45+1' (goal) 54'; Adib (yellow card) 72'; Nakajima-Farran 81' | Stadium: Tuanku Abdul Rahman Stadium; Attendance: 9,401; Referee: Razlan Jeffri Ali |

| 21 February 2017 5 | Terengganu | 2–4 | PKNP | Kuala Terengganu, Terengganu |
| 21:00 UTC+8 | Falcone 37'; Nakajima-Farran 60'; Radhi (yellow card) 72'; Sharin (yellow card) 80' | SMPB Report; StadiumAstro Report | Shahrel 13', 30'; Fadhil (red card) 47'; Krjauklis 52'; Nasrullah 83' (o.g.); Asyraaf (yellow card) 90+2' | Stadium: Sultan Ismail Nasiruddin Shah Stadium; Referee: Muhd Rahmat Jantan |

| 24 February 2017 6 | Terengganu | 2–1 | Kuala Lumpur | Kuala Terengganu, Terengganu |
| 21:00 UTC+8 | Falcone 5'; Lázaro (yellow card) 30'; Firdaus (yellow card) 37'; Turaev 53' | Report | Na'im Nazmi 36'; Zaiful (yellow card) 38'; Dul (yellow card) 70' | Stadium: Sultan Ismail Nasiruddin Shah Stadium; Attendance: 3,200; Referee: Ku Alauddin Ku Muhammad |

| 28 February 2017 7 | Perlis | 1−2 | Terengganu | Kangar, Perlis |
| 16:45 UTC+8 | Alafi (yellow card) 40'; Adams 52'; Stewart (yellow card) 58'; Hafiszuan (yellow card) 88' | Report | Nakajima-Farran 42' (pen.), 45' | Stadium: Tuanku Syed Putra Stadium; Attendance: 580; Referee: Mohd Fairuzi Mat Desa |

| 3 March 2017 8 | Terengganu | 1–0 | ATM | Kuala Terengganu, Terengganu |
| 21:00 UTC+8 | Nakajima-Farran (yellow card) 52' (goal) 84'; Falcone (yellow card) 56' | Report | Azim Faris (yellow card) 57' | Stadium: Sultan Ismail Nasiruddin Shah Stadium; Attendance: 3,100; Referee: Hasrol Mohd Amir |

| 7 April 2017 9 | Terengganu | 2–0 | Sabah | Kuala Terengganu, Terengganu |
| 21:00 UTC+8 | Latiff (yellow card) 15'; Faiz 33'; Lázaro 52'; Ridzuan Razali (yellow card) 76' | Report | Jenius (yellow card) 84'; Dendy (red card) 90+1' | Stadium: Sultan Ismail Nasiruddin Shah Stadium; Attendance: 2,300; Referee: Muhd Rahmat Jantan |

| 14 April 2017 10 | UiTM | 4–0 | Terengganu | Shah Alam, Selangor |
| 16:45 UTC+8 | Do Dong-hyun 33'; Wasiu 44', 48'; Anwarul 90+4' | Report | | Stadium: UiTM Stadium; Attendance: 632; Referee: Mohd Fairuzi Mat Desa |

| 25 April 2017 11 | Johor Darul Ta'zim II | 1–2 | Terengganu | Pasir Gudang, Johor |
| 21:00 UTC+8 | Barrales 6'; Saarvindran (yellow card) 8'; Syazwan (yellow card) 42'; Fernández (yellow card) 82' | Report | Shukur (yellow card) 21'; Ferris 30'; Nasrullah (yellow card) 37'; Falcone 70' | Stadium: Pasir Gudang Corporation Stadium; Attendance: 1,249; Referee: Razlan Jeffri Ali |

| 5 May 2017 12 | Sabah | 2–1 | Terengganu | Kota Kinabalu, Sabah |
| 20:15 UTC+8 | Jenius (yellow card) 66'; Hamran 83'; Jitozono 90+2' | Report | Partiban (yellow card) 62' (goal) 63'; Adib (yellow card) 65'; Nakajima-Farran (yellow card) 66' | Stadium: Likas Stadium; Attendance: 800; Referee: Zulkarnain Zakaria |

| 24 May 2017 13 | Terengganu | 2–1 | UiTM | Kuala Terengganu, Terengganu |
| 21:00 UTC+8 | Nasrullah 9'; Faiz 24'; Turaev (yellow card) 45+2'; Lázaro (yellow card) 48'; Latiff (yellow card) 70' | Report | Wasiu 12'; Syahrizan (yellow card) 89' | Stadium: Sultan Ismail Nasiruddin Shah Stadium; Attendance: 760; Referee: Fitri Maskon |

| 30 June 2017 14 | Terengganu | 2–2 | Johor Darul Ta'zim II | Kuala Terengganu, Terengganu |
| 21:00 UTC+8 | Faiz 47'; Partiban 51'; Ridzuan (yellow card) 89'; Adib (yellow card) 90+3' | Report | Smith 5'; Syazwan 11'; Fernández (yellow card) 45+1'; Cáceres (yellow card) 56' | Stadium: Sultan Ismail Nasiruddin Shah Stadium; Attendance: 9,000; Referee: Zulkarnain Zakaria |

| 10 July 2017 15 | ATM | 0–2 | Terengganu | Kuala Terengganu, Terengganu |
| 21:00 UTC+8 | Suhairy (yellow card) 37'; Sukri (yellow card) 45+2' | Report | Lázaro 39'; Shukur (yellow card) 43'; Ridzuan (yellow card) 45+2'; Gabriel 90+2' | Stadium: Sultan Ismail Nasiruddin Shah Stadium; Attendance: 2,164; Referee: Ahmad Fareez Mat Suburi |

| 14 July 2017 16 | Terengganu | 4−0 | Perlis | Kuala Terengganu, Terengganu |
| 21:00 UTC+8 | Gabriel Davis 27'; Tchétché Kipré 43'; Lázaro 48' (yellow card) 74'; Ridzuan 80' | Report | Alif (yellow card) 26' | Stadium: Sultan Ismail Nasiruddin Shah Stadium; Attendance: 3,849; Referee: Suresh Jayaraman |

| 21 July 2017 17 | Kuala Lumpur | 1–2 | Terengganu | Selayang, Selangor |
| 21:00 UTC+8 | Guilherme 63' | Report | Kipré 19'; Gabriel Davis 83' (pen.) | Stadium: Selayang Stadium; Attendance: 1,399; Referee: Suresh Jayaraman |

| 25 July 2017 18 | Terengganu | 2−2 | Negeri Sembilan | Kuala Terengganu, Terengganu |
| 21:00 UTC+8 | Tchétché Kipré 48', 90+2'; Gabriel Davis (yellow card) 89' | Report | Béhé 39', 41'; Vidić (yellow card) 66'; Igwan (yellow card) 89' | Stadium: Sultan Ismail Nasiruddin Shah Stadium; Attendance: 6,600; Referee: Fitri Maskon |

| 4 August 2017 19 | Kuantan | 0–3 | Terengganu | Kuantan, Pahang |
| 21:00 UTC+8 | | Report | Kipré 35', 48'; Adib 57'; Nasrullah (yellow card) 81' | Stadium: Darul Makmur Stadium; Attendance: 1,817; Referee: S. Logeswaran |

| 12 September 2017 20 | MISC-MIFA | 1–2 | Terengganu | Proton City, Perak |
| 16:45 UTC+8 | Hakim (yellow card) 40'; Sherman 88'; Thinaadkharan (yellow card) 90' | Report | Adib (yellow card) 9'; Kipré 56'; Lázaro (yellow card) 68'; Nakajima-Farran 77' | Stadium: Proton City Stadium; Attendance: 150; Referee: Mohd Zohri Tajuddin |

| 26 September 2017 21 | PDRM | 0–3 | Terengganu | Kuala Terengganu, Terengganu |
| 16:45 UTC+8 | Konaté (yellow card) 34'; Yasir (yellow card) 56' | Report | Faiz 19'; Adib (yellow card) 30'; Kipré 35'; Nakajima-Farran 57' | Stadium: Sultan Ismail Nasiruddin Shah Stadium; Attendance: 5,200; Referee: Wan Mohd Tarmizi Wan Ibrahim |

| 27 October 2017 22 | PKNP | 3–1 | Terengganu | Ipoh, Perak |
| 21:00 UTC+8 | Raffi (yellow card) 26'; Fortunato 51'; Kim Hyun-woo 67'; Firdaus 65' (o.g.) | Report | Kipré 6'; Gabriel (red card) 90+2' | Stadium: Perak Stadium; Attendance: 1,960; Referee: Shaharuddin Man |

=== Piala FA ===
Win Draw Loss

| 13 February 2017 Round of 32 | Felcra | 0–1 | Terengganu | Kuala Terengganu, Terengganu |
| 21:00 UTC+8 | | Report | Latiff 56' | Stadium: Sultan Ismail Nasiruddin Shah Stadium; Attendance: 3,180; Referee: Ku Alauddin Ku Muhammad |

| 11 March 2017 Round of 16 | T–Team | 0–1 (a.e.t.) | Terengganu | Kuala Terengganu, Terengganu |
| 21:00 UTC+8 | | Report | Lutfulla Turaev 119' | Stadium: Sultan Ismail Nasiruddin Shah Stadium; Attendance: 4,510; Referee: Mohd Nafeez Abdul Wahab |

| 1 April 2017 Quarter-final 1st leg | Terengganu | 1–1 | Sarawak | Kuala Terengganu, Terengganu |
| 21:00 UTC+8 | Falcone 21' | Report | Jong-ho 53' | Stadium: Sultan Ismail Nasiruddin Shah Stadium; Attendance: 5,500; Referee: Mohd Nafeez Abdul Wahab |

| 21 April 2017 Quarter-final 2nd leg | Sarawak | 1–1 (a.e.t.) (2–2 agg.) (1–4 p) | Terengganu | Petra Jaya, Sarawak |
| 20:15 UTC+8 | Demerson 80' | Report | Issey 9' | Stadium: Sarawak State Stadium; Attendance: 4,527; Referee: Nagor Amir Noor Mohamed |
| | Penalties |
| | Mateo (penalty missed); Demerson (penalty missed); Shreen (penalty scored) | | (penalty scored) Issey; (penalty scored) Falcone; (penalty scored) Lázaro; (penalty scored) Parthiban |

=== Piala Malaysia ===
On 22 May 2017, the group stages were confirmed with Terengganu facing Selangor, Johor Darul Ta'zim and Sarawak in Group D.

==== Group stage ====
| Pos | Team | Pld | W | D | L | GF | GA | GD | Pts | Qualification | JDT | SGR | SWK | TRG |
|---|---|---|---|---|---|---|---|---|---|---|---|---|---|---|
| 1 | Johor Darul Ta'zim | 6 | 4 | 1 | 1 | 16 | 4 | +12 | 13 | Advance to knockout phase | — | 3–1 | 4–0 | 5–0 |
| 2 | Selangor | 6 | 3 | 1 | 2 | 11 | 11 | 0 | 10 | Advance to knockout phase | 3–2 | — | 1–2 | 1–1 |
| 3 | Sarawak | 6 | 1 | 2 | 3 | 6 | 12 | −6 | 5 | | 0–2 | 1–2 | — | 0–0 |
| 4 | Terengganu | 6 | 0 | 4 | 2 | 6 | 12 | −6 | 4 | | 0–0 | 2–3 | 3–3 | — |

Updated to match(es) played on 9 September 2017. Source: FAM FMLLP

Win Draw Loss

| 4 July 2017 1 | Selangor | 1–1 | Terengganu | Selayang, Selangor |
| 21:00 UTC+8 | Rufino 43' | Report | Issey 64' (pen.) | Stadium: Majlis Perbandaran Selayang Stadium; Attendance: 2,951; Referee: Khairul Azuan Kidam |

| 7 July 2017 2 | Terengganu | 0–0 | Johor Darul Ta'zim | Kuala Terengganu, Terengganu |
| 21:00 UTC+8 | | Report | | Stadium: Sultan Ismail Nasiruddin Shah Stadium; Attendance: 5,355; Referee: Mohd Fairuzi Mat Desa |

| 18 July 2017 3 | Sarawak | 0–0 | Terengganu | Kuching, Sarawak |
| 20:15 UTC+8 | | Report | | Stadium: Sarawak State Stadium; Attendance: 761; Referee: Zulkarnain Zakaria |

| 29 July 2017 4 | Terengganu | 2–3 | Selangor | Kuala Terengganu |
| 21:00 UTC+8 | Faruqi 24'; Tchétché 78' | Report | Forkey Doe 51'; Syahmi 56'; Rufino 90+2' | Stadium: Sultan Ismail Nasiruddin Shah Stadium; Attendance: 7,150; Referee: Nagor Amir Noor Mohamed |

| 1 August 2017 5 | Johor Darul Ta'zim | 5–0 | Terengganu | Larkin, Johor |
| 21:00 UTC+8 | Safawi 19' (pen.); Fadhli 38'; Kunanlan 45+2'; Hazwan 49'; Darren 80' | Report | | Stadium: Tan Sri Dato' Haji Hassan Yunos Stadium; Attendance: 12,370; Referee: Mohd Zohri Tajuddin |

| 9 September 2017 6 | Terengganu | 3–3 | Sarawak | Kuala Terengganu, Terengganu |
| 21:00 UTC+8 | Issey 26'; Tchétché 29', 43' | Report | Roskam 36'; Rahim 61'; Raičković 84' | Stadium: Sultan Ismail Nasiruddin Shah Stadium; Attendance: 543; Referee: Fitri Maskon |

== Statistics ==
=== Appearances ===
| No. | Pos. | Name | Liga Premier | | Piala FA | | Piala Malaysia | | Total | | Discipline | |
| No. | Pos. | Name | Apps | Goals | Apps | Goals | Apps | Goals | Apps | Goals | Yellow card | Red card |
|---|---|---|---|---|---|---|---|---|---|---|---|---|
| 1 | GK | (Malaysia) Syazwan Yusoff | 4 (1) | 0 | 2 | 0 | 1 | 0 | 7 (1) | 0 | 0 | 0 |
| 2 | DF | (Malaysia) Adam Othman Arfah | 0 (2) | 0 | 0 | 0 | 1 | 0 | 1 (2) | 0 | 0 | 0 |
| 3 | DF | (Malaysia) Radhi Yusof | 2 (3) | 0 | 0 | 0 | 2 | 0 | 4 (3) | 0 | 0 | 0 |
| 4 | DF | (Malaysia) Izuan Jarudin | 4 | 0 | 0 | 0 | 1 (1) | 0 | 5 (1) | 0 | 0 | 0 |
| 5 | DF | (Brazil) Lázaro | 20 | 3 | 6 | 0 | 6 | 0 | 32 | 3 | 5 | 0 |
| 6 | MF | (Malaysia) Shukur Jusoh | 7 (8) | 0 | 4 (1) | 0 | 1 (1) | 0 | 12 (10) | 0 | 2 | 0 |
| 7 | MF | (Malaysia) Partiban Janasekaran | 8 (9) | 2 | 1 (3) | 0 | 3 (1) | 0 | 12 (13) | 2 | 2 | 0 |
| 8 | MF | (Brazil) Gabriel Davis | 9 | 3 | 0 | 0 | 5 (1) | 0 | 14 (1) | 3 | 1 | 0 |
| 9 | FW | (Malaysia) Amirul Syahmi | 0 (5) | 0 | 0 (2) | 0 | 1 | 0 | 0 | 0 | 1 | 0 |
| 10 | FW | (Malaysia) Ferris Danial | 15 (3) | 1 | 5 | 0 | 3 (3) | 0 | 23 (6) | 1 | 1 | 0 |
| 11 | MF | (Canada) Issey Nakajima-Farran | 18 | 8 | 5 | 1 | 3 | 2 | 26 | 11 | 5 | 0 |
| 12 | MF | (Malaysia) Ezaidy Khadar | 0 (1) | 0 | 1 | 0 | 1 (1) | 0 | 2 (2) | 0 | 0 | 0 |
| 13 | MF | (Malaysia) Abdul Latiff Suhaimi | 11 (1) | 2 | 3 | 1 | 3 | 0 | 17 (1) | 3 | 7 | 1 |
| 15 | MF | (Malaysia) Faiz Nasir | 12 (6) | 5 | 5 (1) | 0 | 4 (1) | 0 | 21 (7) | 5 | 0 | 0 |
| 16 | MF | (Malaysia) Hafizal Mohamad | 5 (3) | 0 | 2 (1) | 0 | 4 | 0 | 11 (4) | 0 | 1 | 0 |
| 17 | DF | (Malaysia) Nasrullah Haniff | 17 (2) | 1 | 6 | 0 | 3 (1) | 0 | 26 (3) | 1 | 3 | 0 |
| 19 | DF | (Malaysia) Firdaus Faudzi | 21 | 0 | 5 | 0 | 4 | 0 | 30 | 0 | 4 | 1 |
| 20 | MF | (Malaysia) Ridzuan Abdunloh | 4 (2) | 1 | 0 | 0 | 2 (2) | 0 | 6 (4) | 1 | 2 | 0 |
| 21 | MF | (Malaysia) Hazeman Abdul Karim | 0 (1) | 0 | 0 (2) | 0 | 1 | 0 | 1 (3) | 0 | 0 | 0 |
| 22 | DF | (Malaysia) Adib Aizuddin Abdul Latif | 18 (1) | 1 | 5 | 0 | 3 (1) | 0 | 26 (2) | 1 | 8 | 1 |
| 23 | FW | (Ivory Coast) Kipré Tchétché | 9 | 9 | 1 | 0 | 5 | 3 | 15 | 12 | 1 | 0 |
| 24 | GK | (Malaysia) Amierul Hakimi Awang | 6 | 0 | 4 | 0 | 0 | 0 | 10 | 0 | 0 | 0 |
| 26 | GK | (Malaysia) Mohamad Faizal Yusoff | 0 | 0 | 0 | 0 | 0 | 0 | 0 | 0 | 0 | 0 |
| 27 | MF | (Malaysia) Ismail Faruqi | 4 (4) | 0 | 0 (2) | 0 | 1 (1) | 1 | 5 (7) | 1 | 0 | 0 |
| 28 | MF | (Malaysia) Azi Shahril Azmi | 5 | 0 | 0 | 0 | 2 (1) | 0 | 7 (1) | 0 | 1 | 0 |
| 29 | GK | (Malaysia) Suffian Abdul Rahman | 10 | 0 | 0 (1) | 0 | 5 | 0 | 15 (1) | 0 | 0 | 0 |
| 30 | MF | (Malaysia) Sharin Sapien | 9 (1) | 0 | 1 (2) | 0 | 1 | 0 | 11 (3) | 0 | 2 | 0 |
| 31 | MF | (Malaysia) Dhiyaulrahman Hasry | 0 | 0 | 0 | 0 | 0 | 0 | 0 | 0 | 0 | 0 |
| 33 | MF | (Malaysia) Ridzuan Razali | 0 (2) | 0 | 1 | 0 | 0 | 0 | 1 (2) | 0 | 1 | 0 |
**Players who left the club in June/July transfer window or on loan**
| 14 | DF | (Malaysia) Ezzrul Ikmanizar | 0 | 0 | 0 | 0 | 0 | 0 | 0 | 0 | 0 | 0 |
| 18 | MF | (Uzbekistan) Lutfulla Turaev | 11 | 3 | 5 | 1 | 0 | 0 | 16 | 4 | 4 | 0 |
| 20 | FW | (Argentina) Federico Falcone | 11 | 3 | 4 | 0 | 0 | 0 | 15 | 3 | 2 | 0 |
| 23 | MF | (Malaysia) Asrol Ibrahim | 0 (5) | 0 | 0 (3) | 0 | 0 | 0 | 0 (8) | 0 | 0 | 0 |
| 25 | GK | (Malaysia) Sharbinee Allawee | 2 | 0 | 0 | 0 | 0 | 0 | 2 | 0 | 0 | 0 |

Last updated: 27 October 2017.
Source: Stadium Astro

=== Top scorers ===
The list is sorted by shirt number when total goals are equal.

| Rnk | Pos | No. | Player | Liga Premier | Piala FA | Piala Malaysia | Total |
|---|---|---|---|---|---|---|---|
| 1 | FW | 23 | (Ivory Coast) Kipré Tchétché | 9 | 0 | 3 | 12 |
| 2 | MF | 11 | (Canada) Issey Nakajima-Farran | 8 | 1 | 2 | 11 |
| 3 | MF | 15 | (Malaysia) Faiz Nasir | 5 | 0 | 0 | 5 |
| 4 | MF | 18 | (Uzbekistan) **Lutfulla Turaev** | 3 | 1 | 0 | 4 |
| 4 | MF | 20 | (Argentina) **Federico Falcone** | 3 | 1 | 0 | 4 |
| 6 | DF | 5 | (Brazil) Lázaro | 3 | 0 | 0 | 3 |
| 6 | MF | 8 | (Brazil) Gabriel Davis | 3 | 0 | 0 | 3 |
| 6 | MF | 13 | (Malaysia) Abdul Latiff Suhaimi | 2 | 1 | 0 | 3 |
| 9 | MF | 7 | (Malaysia) Partiban Janasekaran | 2 | 0 | 0 | 2 |
| 10 | FW | 10 | (Malaysia) Ferris Danial | 1 | 0 | 0 | 1 |
| 10 | DF | 17 | (Malaysia) Nasrullah Haniff | 1 | 0 | 0 | 1 |
| 10 | MF | 20 | (Malaysia) Ridzuan Abdunloh | 1 | 0 | 0 | 1 |
| 10 | DF | 22 | (Malaysia) Adib Aizuddin | 1 | 0 | 0 | 1 |
| 10 | MF | 27 | (Malaysia) Ismail Faruqi | 0 | 0 | 1 | 1 |
| # | Own goals | | | 0 | 0 | 0 | 0 |
| **Total** | | | | **42** | **4** | **6** | 52 |

* Player names in bold denotes player that left mid-season

Last updated: 27 October 2017.
Source: Liga Malaysia

=== Clean sheets ===
The list is sorted by shirt number when total clean sheets are equal.

| Rnk | No. | Player | Liga Premier | Piala FA | Piala Malaysia | Total |
|---|---|---|---|---|---|---|
| 1 | 29 | (Malaysia) Suffian Abdul Rahman | 5 | 0 | 2 | **7** |
| 2 | 1 | (Malaysia) Syazwan Yusoff | 2 | 1 | 0 | **3** |
| 3 | 24 | (Malaysia) Amierul Hakimi Awang | 1 | 1 | 0 | **2** |
| **Total** | | | **8** | **2** | **2** | **12** |

Last updated: 27 October 2017.
Source: Liga Malaysia
