= 2017 Malaysia Premier League =

Malaysia Premier League
- Season: 2017
- Dates: 20 January 2017–27 October 2017
- Champions: Kuala Lumpur; 1st Second Division title
- Promoted: Kuala Lumpur; Terengganu; PKNP; Negeri Sembilan
- Relegated: ATM; Perlis
- Matches: 132
- Goals: 454 (3.44 per match)
- Top goalscorer: Guilherme de Paula (27 goals)
- Biggest home win: Kuala Lumpur 6–0 ATM (23 May 2017)
- Biggest away win: MISC-MIFA 2–7 UiTM (3 March 2017)
- Highest scoring: ATM 4–5 PDRM (28 February 2017); MISC-MIFA 2–7 UiTM (3 March 2017); Kuantan 3–6 Kuala Lumpur (14 July 2017); MISC-MIFA 6–3 Kuantan (25 July 2017)
- Highest attendance: 9,401; Negeri Sembilan 3–4 Terengganu (17 February 2017)
- Lowest attendance: 50; PDRM 5–3 Kuantan (19 September 2017)
- Total attendance: 197,551
- Average attendance: 1,497
- All statistics correct as of 27 October 2017.

The 2017 Liga Premier (English: 2017 Premier League), also known as the 100PLUS Liga Premier for sponsorship reasons, was the 14th season of the Liga Premier, the second-tier professional football league in Malaysia. Kuala Lumpur were crowned the champions and were promoted to Liga Super since relegated in 2012 season.

The season started on 20 January and concluded on 27 October 2017.

== Season Changes ==
A total of 12 teams contested the league, including 8 sides from the 2016 season, two relegated from the 2016 Liga Super and two promoted from the 2016 Liga FAM.

=== To Liga Premier ===
Relegated from Liga Super

- PDRM
- Terengganu

Promoted from Liga FAM

- MIFA
- PKNP

=== From Liga Premier ===
Promoted to Liga Super

- Melaka United
- PKNS

Relegated to Liga FAM

- Sime Darby

Team withdrawal

- DRB-HICOM (joined the Kuala Lumpur League Division 1)

Note: Table lists in alphabetical order.

Team	Location	Stadium	Capacity
ATM	Tanjung Malim	Proton City Stadium	5,000
Johor Darul Ta'zim II	Pasir Gudang	Pasir Gudang Corporation Stadium	15,000
Kuantan	Kuantan	Darul Makmur Stadium	40,000
Kuala Lumpur	Selayang	Selayang Stadium	11,098
MIFA	Petaling Jaya	Petaling Jaya Stadium	25,000
Negeri Sembilan	Paroi	Tuanku Abdul Rahman Stadium	40,000
PDRM	Krubong	Hang Jebat Stadium	40,000
Perlis	Kangar	Tuanku Syed Putra Stadium	20,000
PKNP	Ipoh	Perak Stadium	42,500
Sabah	Kota Kinabalu	Likas Stadium	35,000
Terengganu	Kuala Terengganu	Sultan Ismail Nasiruddin Shah Stadium	15,000
UiTM	Shah Alam	UiTM Stadium	6,000

== Clubs locations ==
Locations of teams in the 2017 Liga Premier

=== Personnel and sponsoring ===
Note: Flags indicate national team as has been defined under FIFA eligibility rules. Players may hold more than one non-FIFA nationality.

Team	Coach	Captain	Kit	Sponsor
ATM	(Malaysia) Azhar Abdullah	(Malaysia) Venice Elphi	Admiral	Malaysian Armed Forces
Johor Darul Ta'zim II	(Mexico) Benjamin Mora	(Argentina) Nicolás Fernández	Nike	Forest City
Kuantan	(Malaysia) Zulhamizan Zakaria	(Malaysia) Malik Ariff	SkyHawk	Kuantan FC Holding
Kuala Lumpur	(Brazil) Fábio Maciel	(Malaysia) Helmi Remeli	Fawz	JL99 Group & EKOVEST
MIFA	(Malaysia) Jacob Joseph	(Malaysia) K. Nanthakumar	Umbro	MIFA
Negeri Sembilan	(Malaysia) Asri Ninggal	(Malaysia) Nasriq Baharom	Mizuno	Matrix Concepts
PDRM	(Malaysia) Fauzi Pilus	(Singapore) Safuwan Baharudin	Line 7	Forca
Perlis	(Malaysia) Syamsul Saad	(Malaysia) Alafi Mahmud	Carino	Daily Fresco
PKNP	(Malaysia) Abu Bakar Fadzim	(Malaysia) Shahrel Fikri	Puma SE	Perak Corp.
Sabah	(Malaysia) Jelius Ating	(Malaysia) Rawilson Batuil	Carino	Sabah Energy Corp & Asian Supply Base
Terengganu	(Malaysia) Irfan Bakti Abu Salim	(Malaysia) Abdul Latiff Suhaimi	Kobert	Chicken Cottage
UiTM	(Malaysia) Wan Mustaffa Wan Ismail	(Malaysia) Afif Asyraf Zabawi	Umbro	Soaring Upwards

=== Coaching changes ===
Note: Flags indicate national team as has been defined under FIFA eligibility rules. Players may hold more than one non-FIFA nationality.

Team	Outgoing head coach	Manner of departure	Date of vacancy	Position in table	Incoming head coach	Date of appointment
Kuala Lumpur	(Malaysia) Ismail Zakaria	Resigned	23 November 2016	Pre-season	(Brazil) Wanderley da Silva	1 December 2016
Sabah	(Malaysia) Johnny Dominicus	Demote to assistant head coach	25 November 2016	Pre-season	(France) Steve Vilmiaire	25 November 2016
Perlis	(Malaysia) Dollah Salleh	End of contract	30 November 2016	Pre-season	(Malaysia) Razip Ismail	
Johor Darul Ta'zim II	(Mexico) Benjamin Mora	Promoted to JDT I	18 January 2017	Pre-season	(Malaysia) Hamzani Omar	18 January 2017
Kuala Lumpur	(Brazil) Wanderley da Silva			6th	(Brazil) Fábio Maciel	
Perlis	(Malaysia) Razip Ismail	Resigned	4 March 2017	12th	(Malaysia) Syamsul Saad	7 March 2017
Sabah	(France) Steve Vilmiaire	Resigned	19 March 2017	11th	(Malaysia) Jelius Ating	19 March 2017
Johor Darul Ta'zim II	(Malaysia) Hamzani Omar	Rested	19 June 2017	6th	(Mexico) Benjamin Mora	19 June 2017

=== Foreign players ===
Note: Flags indicate national team as has been defined under FIFA eligibility rules. Players may hold more than one non-FIFA nationality.

Club	Player 1	Player 2	Player 3	Player 4 (Asian)	Former Players ^{1}
ATM	(Uzbekistan) Ikbol Babakhanov	(Uzbekistan) Sirojiddin Rakhmatullaev	(Uzbekistan) Pavel Smolyachenko	(South Korea) Bae Beom-geun	
Johor Darul Ta'zim II	(Paraguay) Samuel Cáceres	(Argentina) Nicolás Fernández	(Argentina) **Jerónimo Barrales**	(Australia) Alex Smith	(Argentina) Gabriel Guerra***^2**
Kuantan	(Serbia) Ljubo Baranin	(Serbia) Stefan Vukmirović		(Japan) Shunsuke Nakatake	(South Korea) Shim Un-seob
Kuala Lumpur	(Brazil) **Paulo Josue**	(Argentina) Nicolás Dul	(Brazil) Guilherme de Paula	(Uzbekistan) Bobur Akbarov	(Mali) Modibo Konté
MIFA	(Cameroon) Dimitri Bodric	(Brazil) **Dudu**	(Liberia) **Kpah Sherman**	(South Korea) **Shin Jae-pil**	(Argentina) Alan Aciar (Indonesia) Steven Imbiri (Nigeria) Michael Ijezie
PDRM	(Mali) Souleymane Konaté	(Singapore) **Yasir Hanapi**	(Ivory Coast) Dao Bakary	(Singapore) Safuwan Baharudin	(Ivory Coast) Frederic Pooda
Negeri Sembilan	(Serbia) Nemanja Vidić	(England) Lee Tuck	(France) **Jonathan Béhé**	(Japan) Bruno Suzuki	(Croatia) Marko Šimić
Perlis	(Uzbekistan) **Maksimilian Fomin**	(Mali) **Modibo Konté**	(England) Brandon Adams	(Australia) **Ndumba Makeche**	(South Korea) Oh Kyu-bin (South Korea) Park Yong-joon (Jamaica) Damion Stewart
PKNP	(Latvia) Ritus Krjauklis	(Netherlands) Vincent Weijl	(Brazil) Gilberto Fortunato	(South Korea) **Kim Hyun-woo**	
Sabah	(Zambia) **Francis Kasonde**	(South Korea) **Lee Kil-Hoon**	(Serbia) **Rodoljub Paunović**	(South Korea) **Heo Jae-nyeong**	(France) Sofiane Choubani (France) Jonathan Béhé (Japan) Masaya Jitozono (Croatia) Igor Čerina
Terengganu	(Brazil) Lázaro	(Brazil) **Gabriel Davis**	(Ivory Coast) **Kipré Tchétché**	(Canada) (Japan) Issey Nakajima-Farran	(Argentina) Federico Falcone (Uzbekistan) Lutfulla Turaev
UiTM	(Nigeria) O.K. John	(Ivory Coast) Dechi Marcel	(Nigeria) Akanni-Sunday Wasiu	(South Korea) Do Dong-hyun	

- Players name in **bold** indicates the player is registered during the mid-season transfer window.
- **^1** Foreign players who left their clubs or were de-registered from playing squad due to medical issues or other matters.
- **^2** Johor Darul Ta'zim II swop the strikers with Johor Darul Ta'zim

=== Half-Malaysian players ===
Note: Flags indicate national team as has been defined under FIFA eligibility rules. Players may hold more than one non-FIFA nationality.

Team	Player 1	Player 2	Player 3
Johor Darul Ta'zim II	(England) (Malaysia) Samuel Somerville	(England) (Malaysia) Daniel Ting	(New Zealand) (Malaysia) Ernest Wong Wen Hao

== Results ==
=== League table ===
Pos	Team	Pld	W	D	L	GF	GA	GD	Pts	Promotion, qualification or relegation
1	Kuala Lumpur	22	15	2	5	47	24	+23	47	Promotion to Super League
2	Terengganu	22	15	2	5	42	27	+15	47	Promotion to Super League
3	PKNP	22	14	4	4	41	23	+18	46	Promotion to Super League
4	Johor Darul Ta'zim II	22	11	8	3	47	27	+20	41	
5	Negeri Sembilan	22	11	8	3	37	24	+13	41	Promotion to Super League
6	UiTM	22	9	6	7	44	30	+14	33	
7	Sabah	22	9	3	10	33	38	−5	30	
8	PDRM	22	7	4	11	36	41	−5	25	
9	Kuantan	22	5	1	16	41	64	−23	16	
10	MISC-MIFA	22	4	2	16	36	51	−15	14	
11	ATM	22	4	5	13	28	50	−22	14 (Note: ATM and Perlis was sentenced to a six-point deduction immediately on offense failed to complete the registration process Malaysian League (M-League) 2017. Later, upon careful consideration of the aforementioned appeals, Football Malaysia have decided to only reduce the deduction of 6 points to 3 points for ATM.)	Relegation to FAM League
12	Perlis	22	4	3	15	22	55	−33	12 (Note: ATM and Perlis was sentenced to a six-point deduction immediately on offense failed to complete the registration process Malaysian League (M-League) 2017. Later, upon careful consideration of the aforementioned appeals, Football Malaysia have decided to lift the transfer ban and reduce the deduction of 6 points to 3 points for Perlis.)	Relegation to FAM League

Source: FAM, FMLLP
Rules for classification: 1) Points; 2) Goal difference; 3) Number of goals scored.

=== Result table ===
Home \ Away	ATM	JDT2	KLU	KUA	MIF	NSE	PDRM	PER	PKP	SAB	TRG	UIT
ATM		1–5	1–2	4–3	1–1	1–1	4–5	2–1	0–4	0–2	0–2	1–3
Johor DT II	1–1		3–1	3–1	2–1	1–1	1–0	4–0	1–1	1–0	1–2	1–0
Kuala Lumpur	6–0	2–1		2–1	2–1	3–2	0–2	2–0	1–0	2–0	1–2	1–1
Kuantan	3–1	2–5	3–6		3–2	1–3	3–1	5–0	1–3	3–3	0–3	3–1
MISC-MIFA	2–3	5–3	1–2	6–3		0–0	3–0	2–3	1–2	3–1	1–2	2–7
Negeri Sembilan	1–0	1–1	2–1	3–0	2–1		2–2	1–0	3–1	3–0	3–2	1–0
PDRM	1–1	1–1	0–3	5–3	3–1	1–2		2–0	4–1	0–1	0–3	1–1
Perlis	1–1	1–5	0–5	3–1	2–0	1–1	3–1		1–2	1–3	1–2	1–3
PKNP	1–0	1–2	0–0	2–0	3–1	3–1	2–1	2–0		1–1	3–1	1–0
Sabah	2–5	1–1	1–2	2–1	2–1	2–1	1–3	5–1	1–3		2–1	2–3
Terengganu	1–0	2–2	2–1	2–0	2–1	2–2	1–0	4–0	2–4	2–0		2–1
UiTM	2–1	2–2	1–2	4–1	3–0	1–1	4–3	2–2	1–1	0–1	4–0	

Updated to match(es) played on 27 October 2017. Source: Result
Legend: Blue = home team win; Yellow = draw; Red = away team win.

=== Positions by round ===
Team ╲ Round	1	2	3	4	5	6	7	8	9	10	11	12	13	14	15	16	17	18	19	20	21	22
Kuala Lumpur	3	1	1	3	4	7	6	8	7	5	4	4	3	2	1	1	3	1	1	1	1	1
Terengganu	6	7	4	2	3	3	2	2	2	3	2	3	2	4	4	2	1	2	2	2	2	2
PKNP	9	5	6	6	5	2	3	3	3	2	3	2	4	3	3	4	4	4	4	3	3	3
Johor Darul Ta'zim II	10	3	2	5	2	4	5	6	4	6	7	6	6	5	6	5	5	5	5	5	5	4
Negeri Sembilan	1	4	3	1	1	1	1	1	1	1	1	1	1	1	2	3	2	3	3	4	4	5
UiTM	7	9	10	11	9	9	7	5	5	4	5	5	5	6	5	6	6	6	6	6	6	6
Sabah	12	12	9	10	11	11	11	10	11	10	10	9	9	9	9	8	8	8	7	7	7	7
PDRM	2	6	8	8	7	5	4	4	6	7	6	7	7	7	7	7	7	7	8	8	8	8
Kuantan	8	10	7	9	8	6	8	7	8	8	8	8	8	8	8	9	9	9	9	9	9	9
MIFA	11	11	12	7	10	10	10	11	10	11	11	10	10	10	11	12	12	11	11	11	11	10
ATM	5	2	5	4	6	8	9	9	9	9	9	11	12	12	12	10	11	12	12	12	12	11
Perlis	4	8	11	12	12	12	12	12	12	12	12	12	11	11	10	11	10	10	10	10	10	12

Leader
Relegation to 2018 Liga FAM
Qualified to 2017 Malaysia Cup

== Statistics ==
=== Top scorers ===
As of matches played on 27 September 2017.

Rank	Player	Club	Goals
1	(Brazil) Guilherme de Paula	Kuala Lumpur	27
2	(Nigeria) Akanni-Sunday Wasiu	UiTM	19
3	(Ivory Coast) Dao Bakary	PDRM	15
3	(Malaysia) Malik Ariff	ATM	15
5	(South Korea) Do Dong-hyun	UiTM	13
6	(Cameroon) Bodric Dimitri	MIFA	12
6	(Argentina) Nicolás Fernández	Johor Darul Ta'zim II	12
8	(Argentina) Jeronimo Barrales	Johor Darul Ta'zim II	11
8	(Serbia) Ljubo Baranin	Kuantan	11
8	(Japan) Bruno Suzuki	Negeri Sembilan	11
8	(Malaysia) Shahrel Fikri	PKNP	11
12	(Singapore) Safuwan Baharudin	PDRM	9
12	(Malaysia) Venice Elphi	ATM	9
12	(Ivory Coast) Kipré Tchétché	Terengganu	9
12	(Brazil) Gilberto Fortunato	PKNP	9
16	(Canada) Issey Nakajima-Farran	Terengganu	8
16	(Nigeria) Michael Chukwubunna	MIFA	8
18	(France) Jonathan Béhé	Negeri Sembilan (4), Sabah (3)	7
18	(Croatia) Marko Šimić	Negeri Sembilan	7
18	(Uzbekistan) Pavel Smolyachenko	ATM	7
18	(Liberia) Kpah Sherman	MIFA	7
21	(Malaysia) Brandon Adams	Perlis	6
21	(Brazil) Paulo Josue	Kuala Lumpur	6
21	(South Korea) Shim Un-seob	Kuantan	6
25	(Malaysia) Rafizol Roslan	ATM	5
25	(Argentina) Gabriel Guerra	Johor Darul Ta'zim II	5
25	(Brazil) Dudu	MIFA	5
25	(England) Lee Tuck	Negeri Sembilan	5
25	(South Korea) Lee Kil-Hoon	Sabah	5

=== Hat-tricks ===
As of matches played on 27 September 2017.

Player	For	Against	Result	Date	Ref
(Japan) Bruno Suzuki	Negeri Sembilan	Sabah	3–0 (H)	20 January 2017	
(Argentina) Gabriel Guerra	Johor Darul Ta'zim II	Perlis	4–0 (H)	26 January 2017	
(Cameroon) Bodric Dimitri	MIFA	Johor Darul Ta'zim II	5–3 (H)	10 February 2017	
(Uzbekistan) Pavel Smolyachenko	ATM	Sabah	2–5 (A)	10 February 2017	
(South Korea) Do Dong-hyun	UiTM	MIFA	2–7 (A)	3 March 2017	
(Malaysia) Venice Elphi	ATM	Kuantan	4–3 (H)	25 April 2017	
(Brazil) Guilherme de Paula	Kuala Lumpur	Perlis	0–5 (A)	5 May 2017	
(Brazil) Guilherme de Paula	Kuala Lumpur	ATM	0–6^{6} (A)	23 May 2017	
(Brazil) Guilherme de Paula	Kuala Lumpur	Kuantan	3–6 (A)	14 July 2017	
(Malaysia) Malik Ariff	Kuantan	Sabah	3–3 (H)	24 May 2017	
(South Korea) Lee Kil-Hoon	Sabah	Perlis	5–1 (H)	19 September 2017	
(Ivory Coast) Dao Bakary	PDRM	Kuantan	5–3^{4} (H)	19 September 2017	

Notes:
^{4} Player scored 4 goals; ^{6} Player scored 6 goals; (H) – Home; (A) – Away

=== Own goals ===
Rank	Player	For	Against	Date	Goals
1	(Malaysia) Nasrullah Haniff Johan	Terengganu	PKNP	21 February 2017	1
1	(Malaysia) Faqih Ikhwan	ATM	PDRM	28 February 2017	1
1	(Croatia) Igor Čerina	Sabah	UiTM	28 February 2017	1
1	(Malaysia) Randy Baruh	Sabah	PKNP	3 March 2017	1
1	(Uzbekistan) Ikbol Babakhanov	ATM	Kuala Lumpur	14 April 2017	1
1	(Malaysia) Eskandar Ismail	PDRM	PKNP	14 April 2017	1
1	(Malaysia) Syafiq Azri	Perlis	Negeri Sembilan	25 April 2017	1
1	(Malaysia) Firdaus Faudzi	Terengganu	PKNP	27 October 2017	1

=== Clean sheets ===
As of matches played on 27 October 2017.

Rank	Player	Club	Clean sheets
1	(Malaysia) Asyraaf Omar	PKNP	6
2	(Malaysia) Kaharuddin Rahman	Negeri Sembilan	5
2	(Malaysia) Suffian Abdul Rahman	Terengganu	5
4	(Malaysia) Samuel Sommerville	Johor Darul Ta'zim II	3
4	(Malaysia) Rozaimie Rohim	Sabah	3
4	(Malaysia) Solehin Mamat	Kuala Lumpur	3
4	(Malaysia) Kamarul Effandi	Kuala Lumpur	3
8	(Malaysia) Hamdan Sairi	PDRM	2
8	(Malaysia) Syazwan Yusoff	Terengganu	2
10	(Malaysia) Amierul Hakimi	Terengganu	1
10	(Malaysia) Sharbinee Allawee	Terengganu	1
10	(Malaysia) K. Sasi Kumar	Johor Darul Ta'zim II	1
10	(Malaysia) Remezey Che Ros	Kuala Lumpur	1
10	(Malaysia) Saiful Amar Sudar	Negeri Sembilan	1
10	(Malaysia) Sheril Anuar Saini	Kuantan	1
10	(Malaysia) Jibrail Kamaron Bahrin	Perlis	1
10	(Malaysia) Soffuan Tawil	UiTM	1
10	(Malaysia) Zulfadhli Mohamed	MIFA	1
10	(Malaysia) Ezad Ariff	MIFA	1

=== Monthly awards ===
Month	Player of the Month		Ref
Month	Player	Club	Ref
February	(Japan) Bruno Suzuki	Negeri Sembilan	
March	No award given due to limited number of matches in March		
April	(Malaysia) Nasriq Baharom	Negeri Sembilan	
May	No award given due to limited number of matches in May		
June	No award given due to limited number of matches in June		
July	(Malaysia) Shahrel Fikri	PKNP	
August	No award given due to limited number of matches in August		
September			

== Attendances ==
=== Crowd attendance for all venues ===
As of 27 October 2017.

Home	Away												Attendance	
Home	ATM	JDT	KUL	KUA	MIF	NSE	PDRM	PER	PNKP	SAB	TER	UIT	TOTAL	AVE
ATM	—	232	119	101	141	3,414	153	238	236	120	2,164	107	7,025	639
Johor Darul Ta'zim II	399	—	2,362	670	765	2,623	510	2,679	1,420	2,549	1,249	622	15,848	1,441
Kuala Lumpur	226	691	—	250	217	888	373	242	765	1,347	1,399	375	6,773	616
Kuantan	101	257	125	—	251	607	383	147	65	103	1,817	218	4,074	371
MIFA	500	550	280	100	—	250	212	200	150	300	150	200	2,892	263
Negeri Sembilan	8,249	5,564	8,584	3,136	5,669	—	4,445	4,363	3,643	2,606	9,401	777	56,437	5,131
PDRM	100	200	100	50	500	4,000	—	200	107	100	5,200	200	10,757	978
Perlis	1,175	321	454	520	470	653	556	—	945	1,400	580	552	7,626	694
PNKP	2,237	2,571	1,582	2,018	1,300	1,776	1,457	516	—	1,741	1,960	1,699	18,857	1,715
Sabah	3,200	3,400	3,000	1,100	1,100	1,400	1,300	1,150	1,200	—	800	1,300	18,950	1,723
Terengganu	3,100	9,000	3,200	5,890	4,670	6,600	5,000	3,849	N/A	2,300	—	760	44,369	4,437
UiTM	25	150	195	256	500	400	520	235	695	335	632	—	3,943	359
Total Crowd Attendance													197,551	1,531

=== By Team ===
Pos	Team	Total	High	Low	Average	Change
1	Negeri Sembilan	56,437	9,401	777	5,131	+59.9%
2	Terengganu	44,369	9,000	760	4,437	−17.2%
3	Sabah	18,950	3,400	800	1,723	−36.9%
4	PKNP	18,857	2,571	516	1,715	n/a
5	Johor DT II	15,848	2,679	399	1,441	−41.3%
6	PDRM	10,757	4,000	50	978	−67.3%
7	Perlis	7,626	1,400	321	694	−68.0%
8	ATM	7,025	3,414	101	639	+168.5%
9	Kuala Lumpur	6,773	1,399	217	616	+7.1%
10	Kuantan	4,074	607	103	371	+4.8%
11	UiTM	3,943	1,817	65	359	+40.8%
12	MISC-MIFA	2,892	550	100	263	n/a
	League total	197,551	9,401	50	1,531	−24.7%

Updated to games played on 27 October 2017
Source: SPMB

== See also ==
- 2017 Liga Super
- 2017 Liga FAM
- 2017 Piala FA
- 2017 Piala Malaysia
- 2017 Piala Presiden
- 2017 Piala Belia
- List of Malaysian football transfers 2017
