= 2016 Felda United F.C. season =

Felda United
2016 season
- President: Hanapi Suhada
- Head Coach: Irfan Bakti Abu Salim
- Stadium: Tun Abdul Razak Stadium
- Super League: 2nd
- FA Cup: Round of 16
- Malaysia Cup: Quarter-finals
- Top goalscorer: League: Francis Doe (15); All: Francis Doe (23)
- Highest home attendance: 16,640 vs Johor Darul Ta'zim (24 August 2016)
- Lowest home attendance: 1,615 vs Sarawak (24 September 2016)
- Average home league attendance: 7,487
Home colours	Away colours	Third colours

The 2016 season was Felda United's 10th competitive season and 6th consecutive season in the top flight of Malaysian football, Liga Super.

== Results and fixtures ==
=== Pre-season and friendlies ===
9 January 2016 Friendlies	Nepal	0 − 0	(Malaysia) Felda United	Shamsul Huda Stadium, Jessore
20:45 UTC+08:00		(HT 0 − 0)

13 January 2016 Friendlies	Bangladesh	1 − 1	(Malaysia) Felda United	Bangabandhu National Stadium, Dhaka
6:30 PM BDT	Mithun 76'		Hadin 55'	Attendance: 6,400; Referee: Hien Triet Nguyen (Vietnam)

15 January 2016 Friendlies	Felda United (Malaysia)	1 − 2	Sri Lanka	Bangabandhu National Stadium, Dhaka
3:00 PM BDT	Alias 82'		Nipuna Bandara 19'; Chaturanga 64'	Attendance: 300; Referee: Omar Al-Yacoubi (Oman)

30 January 2016 SAFA Tawau Invitational	Brunei	0 − 3^{1}	(Malaysia) Felda United	Tawau Sports Complex, Tawau, Malaysia
20:00 UTC+8		Report	Thiago 7', 40'; Christie 50'

=== Malaysia Super League ===
Win Draw Loss

13 February 2016 1	Felda United	2 − 0	Kedah	Jengka
9:00 PM MDT	Turaev 65'; Krangar 69' (pen.)	Report		Stadium: Tun Abdul Razak Stadium; Attendance: 8,510; Referee: Mohd Amirul Izwan

16 February 2016 2	Sarawak	1 − 2	Felda United	Kuching
9:00 PM MDT	Juninho 78' (pen.)	Report	Krangar 51'; Doe 86'	Stadium: Sarawak State Stadium; Attendance: 6,123; Referee: Suhaimi

27 February 2016 3	Felda United	2 − 0	T-Team	Jengka
9:00 PM MDT	Hadin 31', 77'	Report		Stadium: Tun Abdul Razak Stadium; Attendance: 4,056; Referee: Muhammad Nazmi

1 March 2016 4	Johor Darul Ta'zim	2 − 1	Felda United	Johor Bahru
9:00 PM MDT	Díaz 50'; S. Chanturu 83'	Report	Turaev 29'	Stadium: Larkin Stadium; Attendance: 16,528; Referee: Mohd Zohri

27 February 2016 5	Felda United	2 − 0	Pahang	Jengka
9:00 PM MDT	Doe 36'; Potokar 82' (o.g.)	Report		Stadium: Tun Abdul Razak Stadium; Attendance: 15,754; Referee: Mohd Amirul Izwan

1 March 2016 6	Terengganu	1 − 4	Felda United	Kuala Nerus
9:00 PM MDT	Joseph 25'	Report	Christie 27'; Yong 67' (o.g.); Krangar 71'; Doe 78'	Stadium: Sultan Mizan Zainal Abidin Stadium; Attendance: 7,250; Referee: Mohd Zohri

8 April 2016 7	Felda United	3 − 1	Selangor	Jengka
9:00 PM MDT	Hadin 10'; Krangar 75'; Doe 78'	Report	Wleh 71'	Stadium: Tun Abdul Razak Stadium; Attendance: 10,835; Referee: Mohd Zamzaidi

20 April 2016 8	Felda United	4 − 0	PDRM	Jengka
9:00 PM MDT	Christie 21'; Turaev 27', 88'; Doe 90+3'	Report		Stadium: Tun Abdul Razak Stadium; Attendance: 3,567; Referee: Muhammad Nazmi

24 March 2016 9	Perak	3 − 2	Felda United	Ipoh
9:00 PM MDT	Firdaus 12'; Elias 76', 80'	Report	Doe 23', 33'	Stadium: Perak Stadium; Attendance: 7,120; Referee: Fitri

4 May 2016 10	Felda United	2 − 0	Kelantan	Jengka
9:00 PM MDT	Turaev 42'; Doe 51'	Report		Stadium: Tun Abdul Razak Stadium; Attendance: 10,981; Referee: W. Wan Ibrahim

18 May 2016 11	Penang	1 − 2	Felda United	George Town
9:00 PM MDT	Lobo 90'	Report	Doe 31'; Hadin 59'	Stadium: City Stadium; Attendance: 7,161; Referee: Sittharanjanan

21 May 2016 12	Felda United	2 − 2	Penang	Jengka
9:00 PM MDT	Syamim 7'; Doe 81'	Report	Lobo 45+1' (pen.); Ikpefua 65'	Stadium: Tun Abdul Razak Stadium; Attendance: 3,202; Referee: Mohd Nafeez

16 July 2016 13	Felda United	2 − 1	Perak	Jengka
9:00 PM MDT	Turaev 24'; Krangar 28'	Report	Fazrul 86'	Stadium: Tun Abdul Razak Stadium; Attendance: 3,651; Referee: Suhaimi

23 July 2016 14	PDRM	1 − 2	Felda United	Malacca
9:00 PM MDT	Konaté 75'	Report	Doe 24'; Turaev 34'	Stadium: Hang Jebat Stadium; Attendance: 500; Referee: Khirul Azuan Kidam

26 July 2016 15	Selangor	1 − 2	Felda United	Shah Alam
9:00 PM MDT	Wleh 59'	Report	Doe 3', 67'	Stadium: Shah Alam Stadium; Attendance: 3,792; Referee: Fairuzi

3 August 2016 16	Kelantan	1 − 1	Felda United	Kota Bharu
9:00 PM MDT	Wander Luiz 77'	Report	Doe 9'	Stadium: Sultan Muhammad IV Stadium; Attendance: 3,536; Referee: Saiful Mohd Radzali

6 August 2016 17	Felda United	2 − 2	Terengganu	Jengka
9:00 PM MDT	Krangar 71'; Syamim 88'	Report	Nakajima-Farran 8'; Ashari 61'	Stadium: Tun Abdul Razak Stadium; Attendance: 3,544; Referee: Mohd Amirul Izwan

16 August 2016 18	Pahang	0 − 3	Felda United	Kuantan
9:00 PM MDT		Report	Krangar 40'; Shukor 44'; Doe 48'	Stadium: Darul Makmur Stadium; Attendance: 898; Referee: Khirul Azuan

24 August 2016 19	Felda United	2 − 3	Johor Darul Ta'zim	Jengka
9:00 PM MDT	Syahid 38'; Hadin 44'	Report	Amri 30'; Lucero 36' (pen.); Zafuan 60'	Stadium: Tun Abdul Razak Stadium; Attendance: 16,640; Referee: Fairuzi

10 September 2016 20	T-Team	3 − 2	Felda United	Kuala Terengganu
9:00 PM MDT	Sharofetdinov 29', 75' (pen.); Konaté 68'	Report	Hadin 51'; Shukor 71'	Stadium: Sultan Ismail Nasiruddin Shah Stadium; Attendance: 117; Referee: Mohd Zohri

24 September 2016 21	Felda United	3 − 3	Sarawak	Jengka
9:00 PM MDT	Alemão 18'; Krangar 53'; Turaev 90'	Report	Tommy 23'; Shamie 39'; Gilmar 43'	Stadium: Tun Abdul Razak Stadium; Attendance: 1,615; Referee: Mohd Zohri

21 September 2016 22	Kedah	1 − 0	Felda United	Alor Setar
9:00 PM MDT	Smeltz 82'	Report		Stadium: Darul Aman Stadium; Attendance: 3,300; Referee: Mohd Zamzaidi

==== League table ====
Pos	Team	Pld	W	D	L	GF	GA	GD	Pts	Qualification or relegation
1	Johor Darul Ta'zim (C)	22	18	4	0	56	14	+42	58	Qualification to AFC Champions League preliminary round 2 (Note: Also qualification to AFC Cup group stage if failed to qualify for the AFC Champions League group stage.)
2	Felda United	22	13	4	5	47	27	+20	43	Qualification to AFC Cup group stage (Note: Since the winners of 2016 Piala FA, Johor Darul Ta'zim, currently qualify for AFC Champions League based on their league position, the spot awarded to the Piala FA winner (AFC Cup group stage) would be passed to the next best team in the table (in this case, the second-placed team).)
3	Kedah	22	11	7	4	30	26	+4	37 (Note: Kedah Football Association (Kedah FA) has been found guilty of putting the suspended player during the match against Pahang on August 3, 2016. Therefore, the Football Association of Malaysia (FAM) has been awarded 3 points for Pahang and Kedah sentenced deducted 3 points for the incident.)	
4	Kelantan	22	7	8	7	37	33	+4	29	
5	Selangor	22	7	7	8	28	27	+1	28	

Source: SPMB Football Association of Malaysia, Football Malaysia LLP
Rules for classification: 1) Points; 2) Goal difference; 3) Number of goals scored; 3) Number of goals against.
(C) Champions

=== FA Cup ===
Win Draw Loss

20 February 2016 Round of 32	Felda United	2 – 0	Ipoh	Jengka
9:00 PM MDT	Doe 41'; Norfazly 90+2'	Report		Stadium: Tun Abdul Razak Stadium; Attendance: 2,422; Referee: Hamdan Awang

5 March 2016 Round of 16	PKNS	3 – 2	Felda United	Malacca
9:00 PM MDT	Guerra 50'; Jadue 66'; Nazrin 70'	Report	Doe 15'; Hadin 76'	Stadium: Hang Jebat Stadium; Attendance: 441; Referee: Mohd Nafeez

=== Malaysia Cup ===
==== Group stage ====
Pos	Team	Pld	W	D	L	GF	GA	GD	Pts	Qualification
1	(Kuala Lumpur) FELDA United	6	4	0	2	9	5	+4	12	Advance to Quarter-finals
2	Negeri Sembilan	6	4	0	2	9	8	+1	12	Advance to Quarter-finals
3	Malacca United	6	3	0	3	9	7	+2	9	
4	Terengganu	6	1	0	5	3	10	−7	3	

Updated to match(es) played on 19 August 2016. Source: FAM FMLLP

Win Draw Loss

12 July 2016 1	Felda United	3 – 1	Negeri Sembilan	Jengka
21:00 UTC+8	Christie 27'; Doe 54', 70'	Report	Annas 64'	Stadium: Tun Abdul Razak Stadium; Attendance: 1,638; Referee: S. Sittharajan

20 July 2016 2	Felda United	0 – 1	Terengganu	Jengka
21:00 UTC+8		Report	Norshahrul 49'	Stadium: Tun Abdul Razak Stadium; Attendance: 1,493; Referee: Razlan Jeffri Ali

29 July 2016 3	Melaka United	0 – 1	Felda United	Malacca
21:00 UTC+8		Report	Shukor 88'	Stadium: Hang Jebat Stadium; Attendance: 13,000; Referee: Mohd Nafeez Abdul Wahab

9 August 2016 4	Felda United	2 – 1	Melaka United	Jengka
21:00 UTC+8	Doe 10', 18'	Report	Nurshamil 12'	Stadium: Tun Abdul Razak Stadium; Attendance: 2,402; Referee: Wan Mohd Tarmizi Wan Ibrahim

12 August 2016 5	Terengganu	0 – 3	Felda United	Kuala Nerus
21:00 UTC+8		Report	Norfazly 20'; Doe 45'; Krangar 78'	Stadium: Sultan Mizan Zainal Abidin Stadium; Attendance: 1,751; Referee: Suresh Jayaraman

19 August 2016 6	Negeri Sembilan	2 – 0	Felda United	Seremban
21:00 UTC+8	Jerković 55'; Nizam 59'	Report		Stadium: Tuanku Abdul Rahman Stadium; Attendance: 2,006; Referee: Muhd Nazmi Nasaruddin

==== Quarter-finals ====
28 August 2016 First Leg	T–Team	1 – 1	Felda United	Kuala Terengganu
21:00 UTC+8	Safawi 3'	Report	Doe 51'	Stadium: Sultan Ismail Nasiruddin Shah Stadium; Attendance: 4,859; Referee: Khirul Azuan Kidam

17 September 2016 Second Leg	Felda United	0 – 1 (1 − 2 agg.)	T–Team	Jengka
21:00 UTC+8		Report	Sharofetdinov 78'	Stadium: Tun Abdul Razak Stadium; Attendance: 7,555; Referee: Mohd Amirul Izwan Yaacob

== Players ==
=== First team squad ===
No.	Name	Nat.	Pos.
Goalkeepers
1	Fairul Azwan Shahrullai	(Malaysia)	GK
22	Mohd Suffian Abdul Rahman	(Malaysia)	GK
30	Mohd Farizal Harun	(Malaysia)	GK
Defenders
3	Gilberto Alemao	(Brazil)	CB
5	Adib Aizuddin Abdul Latif	(Malaysia)	LB
7	Mohammad Khairul Ismail	(Malaysia)	CM
12	Shukor Adan (Captain)	(Malaysia)	CB
15	Mohd Idris Ahmad	(Malaysia)	CB
17	Norfazly Alias	(Malaysia)	CB
18	Mohd Aizulridzwan Razali	(Malaysia)	LB
19	Mohd Firdaus Faudzi	(Malaysia)	RB
26	Hasni Zaidi Jamian	(Malaysia)	RB
Midfielders
6	Abdul Shukur Jusoh	(Malaysia)	CM
8	Ahmad Ezrie Shafizie	(Malaysia)	DM
10	Zah Rahan Krangar	(Liberia)	AM
11	Ahmad Syamim Yahya	(Malaysia)	CM
13	Lutfulla Turaev	(Uzbekistan)	DM
16	D. Christie Jayaseelan	(Malaysia)	RW, LW
20	Irwan Jaszman Azahar	(Malaysia)	CM
21	Mohd Syahid Zaidon	(Malaysia)	CM
23	Hadin Azman	(Malaysia)	RW, LW
28	S. Sivanesan	(Malaysia)	RW, LW
29	Mohd Ridzuan Abdunloh	(Malaysia)	RW, LW
Forwards
9	Bobby Gonzales	(Malaysia)	ST
14	Mohd Zul Fahmi Awang	(Malaysia)	ST
24	Francis Doe	(Liberia)	ST
25	Mohd Ferris Danial	(Malaysia)	ST
	Thiago Augusto Fernandes	(Brazil)	ST

== Squad goals statistics ==
Correct as of match played on 21 September 2016

No.	Nat.	Player	Pos.	Malaysia Super League	FA Cup	Malaysia Cup	TOTAL
1	(Liberia)	Francis Doe	FW	15	2	6	23
2	(Liberia)	Zah Rahan Krangar	MF	8	0	1	9
3	(Uzbekistan)	Lutfulla Turaev	MF	8	0	0	8
4	(Malaysia)	Hadin Azman	MF	6	1	0	7
5	(Malaysia)	D. Christie Jayaseelan	MF	2	0	1	3
6	(Malaysia)	Ahmad Syamim Yahya	MF	2	0	0	2
6	(Malaysia)	Shukor Adan	DF	1	0	1	2
6	(Malaysia)	Norfazly Alias	DF	0	1	1	2
7	(Malaysia)	Mohd Syahid Zaidon	MF	1	0	0	1
7	(Brazil)	Gilberto Alemão	DF	1	0	0	1
TOTALS				44	4	10	58

== Transfers ==
See list of transfers first window transfers and second window transfers
