= List of Malaysian football transfers May-June 2017 =

This is a list of Malaysian football transfers for the 2017 second transfer window. Moves featuring Malaysia Super League, Malaysia Premier League and Malaysia FAM Cup club are listed.

The window opened on 15 May and closed on 11 June 2017.

== 2017 Second Transfers ==
All clubs without a flag are Malaysian. Otherwise it will be stated.

=== Transfers ===
Date	Name	Moving from	Moving to	Fee (Note: Transfer fees are gathered from the various and may not be exact)
1 June 2017	(Malaysia) Hadi Fayyadh Abd Razak	Johor Darul Ta'zim	Johor Darul Ta'zim II	Free
11 June 2017	(Malaysia) Kanadasan Prabakaran	Perlis	Felda United	Free
11 June 2017	(Australia) Dino Djulbic	(Australia) Perth Glory	Felda United	Undisclosed
30 May 2017	(Malaysia) Curran Ferns	Negeri Sembilan	Felda United	Undisclosed
1 June 2017	(Brazil) Thiago Fernandes	(Bahrain) Manama Club	Felda United	Undisclosed
11 June 2017	(Nigeria) Ifedayo Olusegun	(Bahrain) Al-Hidd	Felda United	Free
11 June 2017	(Lebanon) Mootaz El Jounaidi	Felda United	Unattached	
11 June 2017	(Malaysia) Ridzuan Abdunloh	Felda United	Terengganu	Undisclosed
1 June 2017	(Argentina) Lucas Cano	Felda United	(Argentina) Argentinos Juniors	Loan return
11 June 2017	(Argentina) Gastón Cellerino	Felda United	(Colombia) Deportivo Pasto	Free
15 May 2017	(Lebanon) Mohammed Ghaddar	Kelantan	Johor Darul Ta'zim	Undisclosed
18 May 2017	(Lebanon) Abou Bakr Al-Mel	(Lebanon) Tripoli	Kelantan	Undisclosed
15 May 2017	(North Macedonia) Jasmin Mecinović	(North Macedonia) FK Pelister	Melaka United	Free
24 May 2017	(Brazil) Felipe Almeida De Souza	(Brazil) Oeste	Melaka United	Free
12 June 2017	(Malaysia) Norhakim Isa	Perak	Melaka United	Free
1 June 2017	(Malaysia) S. Sivanesan	PKNS	Melaka United	
15 May 2017	(Croatia) Marko Šimić	Negeri Sembilan	Melaka United	
15 May 2017	(Malaysia) Amri Yahyah	Melaka United	Selangor	
15 May 2017	(Malaysia) Syed Sobri Syed Mohamad	Melaka United	T–Team	
15 May 2017	(Malaysia) Khairu Azrin	Melaka United	PKNS	
15 May 2017	(Argentina) Sergio Agüero	Melaka United	Unattached	
15 May 2017	(Ghana) Godwin Antwi	Melaka United	Unattached	
15 May 2017	(Montenegro) Ilija Spasojević	Melaka United	(Indonesia) Bhayangkara	Free
15 May 2017	(Bulgaria) Vladislav Mirchev	Perak	(Bulgaria) Chernomorets Balchik	Free
15 May 2017	(Kosovo) Faton Toski	Perak	Unattached	
5 May 2017	(Malaysia) Raphi Azizan	Kedah	Petaling Jaya Rangers	
17 May 2017	(Argentina) Yamil Romero	(Argentina) Boca Juniors II	Pahang	
15 May 2017	(Nigeria) Bright Dike	Pahang	Unattached	
18 May 2017	(Malaysia) Azidan Sarudin	Kuala Lumpur	Penang	
8 June 2017	(Guam) Brandon McDonald	(Guam) Rovers	Penang	
15 May 2017	(Brazil) Reinaldo Lobo	Penang	Unattached	
15 May 2017	(Australia) Diogo Ferreira	Penang	(India) Mohun Bagan	
1 July 2017	(Brazil) Gilmar	(Brazil) Boa	Perak	Free
1 July 2017	(Brazil) Leandro Dos Santos	(Brazil) Luverdense	Perak	Free
11 June 2017	(The Gambia) Abdou Jammeh	(Qatar) Al-Shamal	PKNS	Free
9 June 2017	(South Korea) Park Kwang-il	(Japan) Ehime	PKNS	Free
4 June 2017	(Portugal) Fábio Ferreira	(Australia) Central Coast Mariners	PKNS	
1 June 2017	(Malaysia) S. Sivanesan	PKNS	Melaka United	
1 June 2017	(Argentina) Gonzalo Soto	PKNS	Unattached	
1 June 2017	(Palestine) Matías Jadue	PKNS	(Thailand) Port	
1 June 2017	(Argentina) Lucas Espíndola	PKNS	(Argentina) Juventud Antoniana	
1 June 2017	(Malaysia) Arip Amiruddin	PKNS	Petaling Jaya Rangers	
1 June 2017	(Malaysia) K. Ravindran	MISC-MIFA	Felcra	
6 June 2017	(Spain) (Malaysia) Natxo Insa	(Spain) Levante	Johor Darul Ta'zim	£360,000
10 June 2017	(Malaysia) Ilham Yusof	Felda United	UiTM	
25 July 2017	(Iraq) Brian Ferreira	Johor Darul Ta'zim	(Ecuador) Fuerza Amarilla	
20 May 2017	(Montenegro) Milos Raičković	(Montenegro) Budućnost Podgorica	Sarawak	
23 May 2017	(Singapore) Sahil Suhaimi	(Singapore) Tampines Rovers	Sarawak	
7 June 2017	(Philippines) Mark Hartmann	Sarawak	Penang	
20 May 2017	(South Korea) Lee Jong-ho	Sarawak	Unattached	
9 June 2017	(Spain) Rufino Segovia	(Hong Kong) Kitchee	Selangor	Free
19 May 2017	(Romania) Victoraș Astafei	Selangor	(Romania) Sepsi Sfântu Gheorghe	Free
9 June 2017	(Brazil) Juliano Mineiro	Selangor	Unattached	
7 June 2017	(Malaysia) Asrol Ibrahim	Terengganu	T–Team	
7 June 2017	(Malaysia) Syed Sobri Syed Mohamad	Melaka United	T–Team	
7 June 2017	(Malaysia) Ooi Shee Keong	MIFA	T–Team	
19 June 2017	(Cameroon) Yannick N'Djeng	(Tunisia) Espérance	T–Team	
1 June 2017	(Malaysia) Muhammad Mohd Faudzi	T–Team	Unattached	
1 June 2017	(Malaysia) Azrul Hazran Amiluddin	T–Team	Unattached	
1 June 2017	(Malaysia) Mohd Naim Zakaria	T–Team	Unattached	
9 July 2017	(Uzbekistan) Farhod Tadjiyev	T–Team	(Uzbekistan) Dinamo Samarqand	
1 June 2017	(Brazil) Paulo Josue	(Brazil) Votuporanguense	Kuala Lumpur	
11 June 2017	(Brazil) Dudu	(Jordan) Sahab	MIFA	
11 June 2017	(Liberia) Kpah Sherman	(Turkey) Çetinkaya	MIFA	
11 June 2017	(South Korea) Shin Jae-pil	Melaka United	MIFA	
11 June 2017	(Malaysia) Darshen Ganesh Pillay	Megah Murni	MIFA	
1 June 2017	(Malaysia) Khairul Izzuwan Shaari	MIFA	Unattached	
1 June 2017	(Nigeria) Ijezie Michael Chukwubunna	MIFA	Unattached	
1 June 2017	(Argentina) Alan Aciar	MIFA	Unattached	
1 June 2017	(Indonesia) Steven Imbiri	MIFA	(Indonesia) Bali United	
1 June 2017	(Malaysia) K. Ravindran	MIFA	Felcra	
9 June 2017	(France) Jonathan Béhé	Negeri Sembilan	MIFA	
9 June 2017	(Malaysia) A. Segar	Negeri Sembilan	Sime Darby	
20 May 2017	(Malaysia) Mukhlis Ihsan Najmi	Penang	Perlis	
20 May 2017	(Malaysia) Aliff Jamaluddin	UKM	Perlis	
20 May 2017	(Malaysia) Amirul Aiman Amran	Petaling Jaya Rangers	Perlis	
20 May 2017	(Malaysia) Fikri Sudin	PKNP	Perlis	
20 May 2017	(Uzbekistan) Maksimilian Fomin	(Oman) Saham Club	Perlis	
20 May 2017	(Malaysia) Muszaki Abu Bakar	Perlis	Unattached	
20 May 2017	(Malaysia) Thirumurugan Veeran	Perlis	Unattached	
20 May 2017	(Malaysia) Syafiq Johari	Perlis	Unattached	
20 May 2017	(Malaysia) Fadzren Alias	Perlis	Unattached	
20 May 2017	(Jamaica) Damion Stewart	Perlis	Unattached	
20 May 2017	(South Korea) Oh Kyu-bin	Perlis	Unattached	
20 May 2017	(South Korea) Park Yong-joon	Perlis	Unattached	
18 May 2017	(South Korea) Heo Jae-Nyeong	(Thailand) Muangthong United	Sabah	
19 May 2017	(South Korea) Lee Kil-Hoon	(Hong Kong) Dreams Sports Club	Sabah	
2 June 2017	(Serbia) Rodoljub Paunović	(Monaco) Iskra Danilovgrad	Sabah	
5 June 2017	(Zambia) Francis Kasonde	(Zambia) Power Dynamos	Sabah	
6 June 2017	(Japan) Masaya Jitozono	Sabah	(Thailand) Nongbua Pitchaya	
29 July 2017	(France) Sofiane Choubani	Sabah	(Algeria) JSM Skikda	
1 June 2017	(Malaysia) Faizal Yusoff	Sungai Ara	Terengganu	
1 June 2017	(Brazil) Gabriel Davis	(Brazil) Tupi	Terengganu	
1 June 2017	(Ivory Coast) Tchétché Kipré	(Oman) Al-Suwaiq	Terengganu	
1 June 2017	(Malaysia) Azi Shahril	Felcra	Terengganu	
1 June 2017	(Malaysia) Ezzrul Ikmanizar	Terengganu	Unattached	
1 June 2017	(Uzbekistan) Lutfulla Turaev	Terengganu	(Uzbekistan) Olmaliq FK	
1 June 2017	(Argentina) Federico Falcone	Terengganu	(Portugal) Aves	
1 June 2017	(Malaysia) Shafiq Mat Isa	Kuantan	Unattached	
1 June 2017	(Malaysia) Nur Zhafri Zaini	Kuantan	Unattached	
1 June 2017	(Malaysia) Faizol Hussien	PDRM	Unattached	
1 June 2017	(Malaysia) Frédéric Pooda	PDRM	Unattached	
1 June 2017	(South Korea) Kim Hyun-woo	(Myanmar) Shan United	PKNP	
1 June 2017	(Malaysia) Harris Roslee	PKNP	Unattached	
1 June 2017	(Malaysia) Muhamad Azmi	PKNP	Unattached	
1 June 2017	(Malaysia) Azrul Nizam Muhammad	PKNP	Unattached	
1 June 2017	(Malaysia) Khairul Akhyar Husain	UiTM	Unattached	
1 June 2017	(Malaysia) Wan Khairil Azwa Jusoh	UiTM	Unattached	

=== Loans ===
Date	Name	Moving from	Moving to
1 June 2017	(Malaysia) Azniee Taib	Johor Darul Ta'zim II	Melaka United
1 June 2017	(Malaysia) Fandi Othman	Johor Darul Ta'zim II	Melaka United
1 June 2017	(Malaysia) Nicholas Swirad	Johor Darul Ta'zim II	Melaka United
9 August 2017	(Malaysia) Farid Ramli	Felda United	Kuala Lumpur
13 May 2017	(Malaysia) Alif Shamsudin	Melaka United	Felcra
15 May 2017	(Malaysia) Ridzuan Azly Hussham	Perak	UiTM
15 May 2017	(Malaysia) Hafiz Ramdan	Perak	PKNP
15 May 2017	(Malaysia) Raffi Nagoorgani	Perak	PKNP
1 June 2017	(Malaysia) Sabre Abu	PKNS	Negeri Sembilan
1 June 2017	(Malaysia) Tam Sheang Tsung	Melaka United	Kuala Lumpur
1 June 2017	(Mali) Modibo Konté	Kuala Lumpur	Perlis
11 June 2017	(Malaysia) Ezad Ariff Jamaludin	Negeri Sembilan	MIFA
11 June 2017	(Malaysia) Shahrul Hakim	Kelantan	MIFA
11 June 2017	(Malaysia) Fakhrul Zaman	Kelantan	MIFA
22 May 2017	(Malaysia) Nik Shahrul Azim	Kelantan	Negeri Sembilan
1 June 2017	(Malaysia) Rahizi Rasib	Negeri Sembilan	Felcra

=== Unattached Players ===
Date	Name	New Club
15 May 2017	(Malaysia) Darwira Sazan	Penang
15 May 2017	(Malaysia) Elias Sulaiman	Penang
18 May 2017	(Malaysia) R. Surendran	Penang
19 May 2017	(The Gambia) Sanna Nyassi	Penang
1 June 2017	(Malaysia) Tauffiq Ar Rasyid Johar	PKNS
1 June 2017	(Malaysia) Safwan Hashim	Felda United
1 June 2017	(Malaysia) Hazuan Daud	Kuantan
1 June 2017	(Malaysia) Azhar Arbi Radzuan	PKNP
20 May 2017	(Malaysia) Riduwan Ma'on	Perlis
20 May 2017	(Malaysia) Syamirul Shahadidi	Perlis
20 May 2017	(Australia) Ndumba Makeche	Perlis
20 May 2017	(Malaysia) Radzuan Abdullah	Negeri Sembilan
