= 2017 Malaysia FA Cup =

Piala FA

Tournament details
- Country: Malaysia
- Dates: 5 February – 20 May 2017
- Teams: 37

Final positions
- Champions: Kedah (4th title)
- Runners-up: Pahang

Tournament statistics
- Matches played: 40
- Goals scored: 116 (2.9 per match)
- Attendance: 421,739 (10,543 per match)
- Top goal scorer: Ken Ilsø (5 goals)

Awards
- Best player: Baddrol Bakhtiar

The 2017 Malaysia FA Cup was the 28th season of the Malaysia FA Cup a knockout competition for Malaysia's state football association and clubs. The final was played between Pahang and Kedah at the Shah Alam Stadium in Shah Alam, Selangor. Kedah beat Pahang 2–3 to win the cup for the fourth time.

37 teams entered the competition. Kedah, the winners of the competition, did not obtain a licence for the 2018 AFC Cup.

== Teams ==
- 6 teams from FAM League entered in the First Round. DYS and Sungai Ara withdraw from the competition.
- 27 teams (12 teams from Super League, 12 teams from Premier League and three teams from FAM League) entered in the Second Round.

== Round and draw dates ==
Round	Draw date	1st leg	2nd leg
First Round	22 December 2016, 15:00 UTC+8	5–6 February 2017	
Second Round	22 December 2016, 15:00 UTC+8	13–15 February 2017	
Third Round	19 February 2017, 08:00 UTC+8	10–11 March 2017	
Quarter-finals	12 March 2017, 09:30 UTC+8	1 Apr	21&23 Apr
Semi-final	12 March 2017, 09:30 UTC+8	30 Apr	13 May
Final	12 March 2017, 09:30 UTC+8	20 May	

== Matches ==
Key: (1) = Super League; (2) = Premier League; (3) = FAM League

=== First Round ===
5 February 2017	Penjara (3) (Negeri Sembilan)	0–2	(Kuala Lumpur) FELCRA (3)	Kajang, Selangor
16:15 (UTC+8)		Report	3' Firdaus; 44' Shazuan	Stadium: Stadium Penjara Kajang; Attendance: 300; Referee: P. Jeevanathan

5 February 2017	SAMB (3) (Malacca)	0–1	(Selangor) PBMS F.C. (3)	Malacca City, Malacca
16:15 (UTC+8)		Report	62' Fazli Baharuddin	Stadium: Hang Tuah Stadium; Attendance: 200; Referee: Mohd Ridhwan Abd Rahman

6 February 2017	Sime Darby (3) (Kuala Lumpur)	3–0	(Pahang) Shahzan Muda (3)	Selayang, Selangor
16:15 (UTC+8)	Zul 20'; Dzul 47'; Saiful 55'	Report		Stadium: Majlis Perbandaran Selayang Stadium; Attendance: 80; Referee: S. Logeswaran

=== Second Round ===
13 February 2017	Sime Darby (3) (Kuala Lumpur)	0–3	(Pahang) Kuantan (2)	Selayang, Selangor
16:15 UTC+8		Report	3', 11' Malik; 78' Rafizi	Stadium: Selayang Stadium; Attendance: 80; Referee: Hamdan Awang (Terengganu)

13 February 2017	FELCRA (3) (Kuala Lumpur)	0–1	Terengganu (2)	Kuala Terengganu, Terengganu
21:00 UTC+8		Report	56' Latiff	Stadium: Sultan Ismail Nasiruddin Shah Stadium; Attendance: 3180; Referee: Ku Alauddin Ku Muhammad (Kelantan)

14 February 2017	Petaling Jaya Rangers (3) (Selangor)	1–2	(Selangor) UiTM (2)	Petaling Jaya
16:15 UTC+8	Faizwan 71'	Report	48' Afif; 88' Dong-hyun	Stadium: Petaling Jaya Stadium; Attendance: 200; Referee: Mohd Ridzuan Razali

14 February 2017	Perlis (2)	1–0	PDRM (2)	Kangar, Perlis
16:15 UTC+8	Brandon 90+1'	Report		Stadium: Tuanku Syed Putra Stadium; Attendance: 752; Referee: Mohd Jefri Bin Zolkefli (Perak)

14 February 2017	Sarawak (1)	6–3	(Malaysia) MIFA (2)	Petra Jaya, Sarawak
20:15 UTC+8	Mark 12', 60', 81'; Mateo 24', 38'; Ronny 33'	Report	57' Shee Kiong; 70', 78' (pen.) Ijezie	Stadium: Sarawak State Stadium; Attendance: 1798; Referee: Fitri Maskon (Malacca)

14 February 2017	Sabah (2)	1–0	(Kuala Lumpur) UKM (3)	Likas, Sabah
20:15 UTC+8	Igor 14'	Report		Stadium: Likas Stadium; Attendance: 1100; Referee: Razlan Jefri Ali (Selangor)

14 February 2017	MPKB-BRI U-Bes (3) (Kelantan)	0–1	Penang (1)	Kota Bharu, Kelantan
21:00 UTC+8		Report	42' Nigel	Stadium: Sultan Mohammad IV Stadium; Attendance: 3267; Referee: Samsudin Ibrahim (Terengganu)

14 February 2017	PKNP (2) (Perak)	1–1 (a.e.t.) (4–3 p)	Kelantan (1)	Ipoh, Perak
21:00 UTC+8	Mugenthiran 10'	Report	63' Indra	Stadium: Perak Stadium; Attendance: 3220; Referee: Muhammad Rahmat Jantan (Selangor)
	Penalties
	Mugenthiran (penalty missed); Krjauklis (penalty scored); Fadhli (penalty missed); Faizzwan (penalty scored); Gilberto (penalty scored); Deevan (penalty scored)		(penalty scored) Celin; (penalty scored) Danso; (penalty missed) Gomis; (penalty scored) Indra; (penalty missed) Ghaddar; (penalty missed) Daudsu

14 February 2017	Melaka United (1) (Malacca)	1–0	(Selangor) PKNS (1)	Krubong, Malacca
21:00 UTC+8	Amri 66'	Report		Stadium: Hang Jebat Stadium; Attendance: 4002; Referee: Zulkarnain Zakaria (Kuala Lumpur)

14 February 2017	FELDA United (1) (Kuala Lumpur)	0–2	Johor Darul Ta'zim (1)	Jengka, Pahang
21:00 UTC+8		Report	13' Guerra; 80' Cabrera	Stadium: Tun Abdul Razak Stadium; Attendance: 5572; Referee: Zulkifli Bin Ahmad (Kuala Lumpur)

14 February 2017	Johor Darul Ta'zim II (2)	2–4 (a.e.t.)	Pahang (1)	Pasir Gudang, Johor
21:00 UTC+8	Hadi Fayyad 35', 38'	Report	46', 68' Sumareh; 105' Alves; 110' Raj	Stadium: Majlis Perbandaran Pasir Gudang Stadium; Attendance: 1668; Referee: Khairulazuan Kidam (Negeri Sembilan)

14 February 2017	Kedah (1)	4–2	Kuala Lumpur (2)	Alor Setar, Kedah
21:00 UTC+8	Liridon 33'; Zaiful 36' (og.); Farhan 42', 63'	Report	76' (og.) Zac; 90+3' Zaiful	Stadium: Darul Aman Stadium; Attendance: 12000; Referee: Suresh Jayaraman (Selangor)

14 February 2017	Selangor (1)	0–0 (a.e.t.) (3–4 p)	Negeri Sembilan (2)	Selayang, Selangor
21:00 UTC+8		Report		Stadium: Selayang Stadium; Attendance: 4704; Referee: S.Sittharanjanan (Sabah)
	Penalties
	Juliano (penalty scored); Razman (penalty scored); Doe (penalty scored); Halim (penalty missed); Ugo (penalty missed)		(penalty missed) Hazrul; (penalty scored) Lee Tuck; (penalty scored) Vidić; (penalty scored) Faizal; (penalty scored) Suzuki

14 February 2017	T–Team (1) (Terengganu)	1–1 (a.e.t.) (4–2 p)	ATM (2)	Kuala Terengganu, Terengganu
21:00 UTC+8	Farhod 51' (pen.)	Report	6' (pen.) Pavel	Stadium: Sultan Ismail Nasiruddin Shah Stadium; Attendance: 810; Referee: P. Jeevanathan
	Penalties
	Farhod (penalty scored); Dilshod (penalty scored); Fakhrurazi (penalty scored); Samassa (penalty missed); Hakim (penalty scored)		(penalty scored) Venice Elphi; (penalty scored) Ikbol; (penalty missed) Azim; (penalty missed) Sirojiddin

15 February 2017	KDMM (3) (Sabah)	0–4	(Kuala Lumpur) MOF (3)	Likas, Sabah
20:15 UTC+8		Report	31', 79' Rudie; 37' Hafizi; 90+3' Hakim	Stadium: Likas Stadium; Attendance: 432; Referee: Tuan Mohd Yaasin (Selangor)

15 February 2017	Perak (1)	3–0	(Selangor) PBMS (3)	Ipoh, Perak
21:00 UTC+8	Mirchev 13'; Faton 25', 49'	Report		Stadium: Perak Stadium; Attendance: 0 Referee: Mohd Hasrol Mohd Amir (Kelantan)

=== Third Round ===
10 March 2017	PKNP (2) (Perak)	5–4	(Pahang) Kuantan (2)	Ipoh, Perak
21:00 UTC+8	Isskandar 5' (og.); Fadhli 24'; Shahrel 31', 90+4'; Vincent 37'	Report	41' (pen.), 83' (pen.) Baranin; 78' Malik; 90+2' Stefan	Stadium: Perak Stadium; Attendance: 2374; Referee: Tuan Mohd Yaasin Tuan Mohd Hanafiah (Selangor)

11 March 2017	Perlis (2)	1–2	Sarawak (1)	Kangar, Perlis
16:15 UTC+8	Oh Kyu 49'	Report	26' Abdul Rahim; 35' Mark	Stadium: Tuanku Syed Putra Stadium; Attendance: 1033; Referee: Nagor Amir Noor Mohammed (Kuala Lumpur)

11 March 2017	Sabah (2)	4–2	(Kuala Lumpur) MOF (3)	Kota Kinabalu, Sabah
20:15 UTC+8	Rahman 5', 22'; Sofiane 45+2'; Ummareng 86'	Report	9' Farizal; 13' Aikal	Stadium: Likas Stadium; Attendance: 800; Referee: Suresh Jayaraman (Selangor)

11 March 2017	Perak (1)	0–2	Kedah (1)	Ipoh, Perak
21:00 UTC+8		Report	28' Zac; 43' Ken Ilsø	Stadium: Perak Stadium; Attendance: 24,935; Referee: Mohd Nazmi Nasaruddin (Penang)

11 March 2017	T–Team (1) (Terengganu)	0–1 (a.e.t.)	Terengganu (2)	Kuala Terengganu, Terengganu
21:00 UTC+8		Report	119' Lutfulla Turaev	Stadium: Sultan Ismail Nasiruddin Shah Stadium; Attendance: 4,510; Referee: Mohd Nafeez Abd Wahab (Johor)

11 March 2017	Negeri Sembilan (2)	4–1 (a.e.t.)	Penang (1)	Paroi, Negeri Sembilan
21:00 UTC+8	Šimić 45'; Lee Tuck 107', 112', 120'	Report	48' Lobo	Stadium: Tuanku Abdul Rahman Stadium; Attendance: 16502; Referee: Zulkifli Ahmad (Kuala Lumpur)

11 March 2017	Pahang (1)	2–0	(Malacca) Melaka United (1)	Kuantan, Pahang
21:00 UTC+8	Jae-won 16' (pen.); Azam 86'	Report		Stadium: Darul Makmur Stadium; Attendance: 20298; Referee: Mohd Amirul Izwan Yaacob (Perak)

11 March 2017	Johor Darul Ta'zim (1)	4–0	(Selangor) UiTM (2)	Larkin, Johor
21:00 UTC+8	Gonzalo 20', 53'; Hazwan 22'; Fadhli Shas 71'	Report		Stadium: Tan Sri Dato Haji Hassan Yunos Stadium; Attendance: 12755; Referee: Zulkarnain Zakaria (Kuala Lumpur)

=== Bracket ===
Quarterfinals
Pahang	3	1	4
Johor Darul Ta'zim	1	2	3
Sabah	0	0	0
Negeri Sembilan	1	0	1
Kedah	6	0	6
(Perak) PKNP	1	1	2
Terengganu (p)	1	1	2(4)
Sarawak	1	1	2(1)

Semifinals
Pahang	1	2	3
Negeri Sembilan	0	1	1
Kedah	1	3	4
Terengganu	0	0	0

Final
Pahang	2
Kedah	3

=== Quarter-final ===
Team 1	Agg.	Team 2	1st leg	2nd leg
Pahang (1)	4–3	Johor Darul Ta'zim (1)	3–1	1–2
Sabah (2)	0–1	Negeri Sembilan (2)	0–1	0–0
Kedah (1)	6–2	(Perak) PKNP (2)	6–1	0–1
Terengganu (2)	2–2 (4–1 p)	Sarawak (1)	1–1	1–1

==== First leg ====
1 April 2017	Pahang (1)	3–1	Johor Darul Ta'zim (1)	Kuantan, Pahang
21:00 UTC+8	Syamim 14'; Matheus 49'; Dike 67'	Report	22' Marcos	Stadium: Darul Makmur Stadium; Attendance: 29,100; Referee: Suhaimi Mat Hassan

1 April 2017	Sabah (2)	0–1	Negeri Sembilan (2)	Kota Kinabalu, Sabah
20:15 UTC+8		Report	26' Simic	Stadium: Likas Stadium; Attendance: 4,100; Referee: Muhammad Zamzaidi Katimin

1 April 2017	Kedah (1)	6–1	(Perak) PKNP (2)	Alor Setar, Kedah
21:00 UTC+8	Fitri 15'; Mugenthiran 30' (og.); Liridon 45' (pen.); Ken 48', 90+1'; Syafiq 86'	Report	85' Khairul	Stadium: Darul Aman Stadium; Attendance: 24,500; Referee: Fitri Maskan

1 April 2017	Terengganu (2)	1–1	Sarawak (1)	Kuala Terengganu, Terengganu
21:00 UTC+8	Falcone 21'	Report	53' Jong-ho	Stadium: Sultan Ismail Nasiruddin Shah Stadium; Attendance: 5,500; Referee: Mohd Nafeez Abd Wahab

==== Second leg ====
23 April 2017	Johor Darul Ta'zim (1)	2–1 (3–4 agg.)	Pahang (1)	Larkin, Johor
21:00 UTC+8	Gonzalo 6'; Gabriel 23'	Report	87' Sumareh	Stadium: Tan Sri Dato Haji Hassan Yunos Stadium; Attendance: 23,420; Referee: Zulkifli Ahmad

21 April 2017	Negeri Sembilan (2)	0–0 (1–0 agg.)	Sabah (2)	Paroi, Negeri Sembilan
21:00 UTC+8		Report		Stadium: Tuanku Abdul Rahman Stadium; Attendance: 20,736; Referee: Mohd Amirul Izwan Bin Yaacob

21 April 2017	PKNP (2) (Perak)	1–0 (2–6 agg.)	Kedah (1)	Ipoh, Perak
21:00 UTC+8	Shahrel 10'	Report		Stadium: Perak Stadium; Attendance: 3,857; Referee: Zulkarnain Zakaria

21 April 2017	Sarawak (1)	1–1 (a.e.t.) (2–2 agg.) (1–4 p)	Terengganu (2)	Petra Jaya, Sarawak
20:15 UTC+8	Demerson 80'	Report	9' Issey	Stadium: Sarawak State Stadium; Attendance: 4,527; Referee: Nagor Amir Noor Mohamed
	Penalties
	Mateo (penalty missed); Demerson (penalty missed); Shreen (penalty scored)		(penalty scored) Issey; (penalty scored) Falcone; (penalty scored) Lazaro; (penalty scored) Parthiban

=== Semi-final ===
Team 1	Agg.	Team 2	1st leg	2nd leg
Pahang (1)	3–1	Negeri Sembilan (2)	1–0	2–1
Kedah (1)	4–0	Terengganu (2)	1–0	3–0

==== First leg ====
30 April 2017	Pahang (1)	1–0	Negeri Sembilan (2)	Kuantan, Pahang
21:00 UTC+8	Annas 80' (og.)	Report		Stadium: Darul Makmur Stadium; Attendance: 30,149; Referee: Razlan Jofri Ali

30 April 2017	Kedah (1)	1–0	Terengganu (2)	Alor Setar, Kedah
21:00 UTC+8	Farhan 70'	Report		Stadium: Darul Aman Stadium; Attendance: 22,000; Referee: Muhammad Zamzaidi Katimin

==== Second leg ====
13 May 2017	Negeri Sembilan (2)	1–2 (1–3 agg.)	Pahang (1)	Paroi, Negeri Sembilan
21:00 UTC+8	68' Bruno	Report	6' Jae-won; 90+2' Jayaseelan	Stadium: Tuanku Abdul Rahman Stadium; Attendance: 38,380

13 May 2017	Terengganu (2)	0–3 (0–4 agg.)	Kedah (1)	Kuala Terengganu, Terengganu
21:00 UTC+8		Report	6' Liridon; 28' Ken; 48' Sandro	Stadium: Sultan Ismail Nasiruddin Shah Stadium; Attendance: 10,000; Referee: Nagor Amir Noor Muhamad

=== Final ===
The final was played on 20 May 2017 at Shah Alam Stadium.

20 May 2017
21:00 UTC+8

Pahang	2–3	Kedah
Heo Jae-won 45+3'; Sumareh 80'	Report	20' Ken Ilsø; 45+1', 72' Baddrol

Shah Alam Stadium, Shah Alam
Attendance: 78,898
Referee: Nagor Amir Noor Mohamed

== Broadcasting rights ==
These matches were covered live on Malaysia television:

Round	Media Prima
First round	None
Second Round	Felda United v Johor Darul Ta'zim (TV9)
Third Round	Perak v Kedah (TV9)
Quarter-final (1st leg)	Pahang v JDT (TV9)
Quarter-final (2nd leg)	(21 Apr) Negeri Sembilan v Sabah (TV9) (23 Apr) JDT v Pahang (TV9)
Semi-final (1st leg)	Kedah v Terengganu (TV9)
Semi-final (2nd leg)	Negeri Sembilan v Pahang (TV3); Terengganu v Kedah (TV9)
Final	Pahang v Kedah (TV3)

== See also ==
- 2017 Malaysia Super League
- 2017 Malaysia Premier League
- 2017 Malaysia FAM League
- 2017 Malaysia Cup
- 2017 Piala Presiden
- 2017 Piala Belia
- List of Malaysian football transfers 2017
