= Shukur Jusoh =

Malaysian footballer

Personal information
- Full name: Abdul Shukur bin Jusoh
- Date of birth: 28 February 1989 (age 37)
- Place of birth: Terengganu, Malaysia
- Height: 1.73 m (5 ft 8 in)
- Position: Midfielder

Team information
- Current team: Terengganu II
- Number: 27

Youth career
- 2006–2007: Terengganu

Senior career*
Years	Team	Apps	(Gls)
2008–2010	Harimau Muda		
2010–2011	Harimau Muda A		
2011–2012	Terengganu		
2013–2014	Selangor		
2015	ATM		
2016	Felda United	14	(1)
2017–2018	Terengganu		
2018–	Terengganu II		

International career^{‡}
2008–2010	Malaysia U-21		
2011–2012	Malaysia U-23		
2012	Malaysia	1	(0)
Medal record
Malaysia U23
Sea Games
Gold medal – first place	Sea Games 2011	Football
- * Club domestic league appearances and goals as of 1 November 2017 ‡ National team caps and goals as of 11 January 2017

Abdul Shukur bin Jusoh (born 28 February 1989) is a Malaysian professional footballer who plays for Malaysian side Terengganu II. Shukur plays mainly as an attacking midfielder but also can plays as a right winger.

== Career statistics ==
=== Club ===
As of 1 November 2017.

Club	Season	League		Cup		League Cup		Continental		Total	
Club	Season	Apps	Goals	Apps	Goals	Apps	Goals	Apps	Goals	Apps	Goals
Felda United	2016	14	1	2	0	0	0	–		0	0
Felda United	Total	0	0	0	0	0	0	0	0	0	0
Terengganu	2017	15	0	5	0	2	0	–		22	0
Terengganu	2018	0	0	0	0	0	0	–		0	0
Terengganu	Total	15	0	5	0	2	0	0	0	22	0
