= Nor Fazly Alias =

Malaysian footballer

Personal information
- Full name: Nor Fazly bin Alias
- Date of birth: 31 May 1981 (age 45)
- Place of birth: Kuala Terengganu, Malaysia
- Height: 1.76 m (5 ft 9 in)
- Position: Centre-back

Team information
- Current team: KT Rovers F.C.

Senior career*
Years	Team	Apps	(Gls)
2002–2007	Terengganu		
2007–2008	Pahang		
2009–2012	T–Team		
2013–2015	ATM	31	(3)
2016–2019	Felda United	27	(0)
2020–	KT Rovers F.C.	0	(0)

International career^{‡}
2001	Malaysia U-23		
2006	Malaysia XI		
2004–2007	Malaysia	6	(0)
- * Club domestic league appearances and goals as of 20 December 2020 ‡ National team caps and goals as of 15 May 2014

Nor Fazly bin Alias (born 31 May 1981, in Kuala Terengganu) is a Malaysian professional footballer who plays for Felda United in the Malaysia Premier League. He primarily plays as a centre-back but he can also play as a left back.

== Club career ==
=== Early career ===
Nor Fazly began his career at his hometown team Terengganu, he played there for 7 seasons, before departing for Pahang at the end of 2007 season. He only played with Pahang for a season, before returned to Terengganu and played for T–Team during 2009 season.

== International career ==
Nor Fazly has represented the Malaysia senior team seven times including one Non-FIFA match and was in Malaysia's 2004 Tiger Cup squad.

== Career statistics ==
=== Club ===
As of 27 July 2018.

Club	Season	League		Cup		League Cup		Continental		Total	
Club	Season	Apps	Goals	Apps	Goals	Apps	Goals	Apps	Goals	Apps	Goals
Felda United
Felda United	2016	11	0	1	1	0	0	–		12	1
Felda United	2017	11	0	1	0	2	0	5	0	19	0
Felda United	2018	5	0	1	0	0	0	–		6	0
Felda United	Total	27	0	3	1	2	0	5	0	37	1
Career Total		0	0	0	0	0	0	–	–	0	0

=== International ===
As of 22 March 2017

National team	Year	Apps	Goals
Malaysia
Malaysia	2014	3	0
Malaysia	2015	2	0
Malaysia	2017	1	0
Malaysia	Total	6	0

== Honours ==
=== Club ===
Felda United

- Malaysia Premier League: 2018
