= Syazwan Yusoff =

Malaysian footballer

Personal information
- Full name: Muhammad Syazwan bin Yusoff
- Date of birth: 17 April 1992 (age 34)
- Place of birth: Morak, Tumpat, Kelantan
- Height: 1.83 m (6 ft 0 in)
- Position: Goalkeeper

Team information
- Current team: Kelantan WTS
- Number: 29

Youth career
- 2010: Kelantan President's Cup

Senior career*
Years	Team	Apps	(Gls)
2011–2016	Kelantan	32	(0)
2016	→ Melaka United (loan)	13	(0)
2017–2018	Terengganu	6	(0)
2019	Selangor United		
2019−2021	Kelantan United	15	(0)
2025−	Kelantan WTS		

International career
2012	Malaysia U23	1	(0)
- * Club domestic league appearances and goals

Muhammad Syazwan bin Yusoff (born 17 April 1992) is a Malaysian footballer who plays as a goalkeeper for Kelantan WTS.

== Club career ==
=== Kelantan FA ===
Born in Morak, Tumpat, Syazwan started his career with Kelantan President's Cup team in 2010. He was the first choice of his team in every match besides Judtanna Eh Put another goalkeeper. He was registered for Kelantan senior squad as the third goalkeeper by Kelantan's coach, M. Karathu during 2011 season. In season 2012, he was selected as the second goalkeeper behind Khairul Fahmi Che Mat after Mohd Shahrizan Ismail having 6-month suspended from Malaysian football.

=== Melaka United ===
In December 2015, Syazwan joined Malaysia Premier League club Melaka United on loan from Kelantan FA until the end of the season. Syazwan made his debut for the club in the League Cup against Sime Darby F.C. playing at the Selayang Stadium. That match end up draw 2–2. Syazwan became regular member of Melaka United's first team during the 2016 season.

== Career statistics ==
As of 27 June 2018

Club	Season	League		Cup (Note: The Malaysia FA Cup)		League Cup (Note: The Malaysia Cup)		Continental		Total	
Club	Season	Apps	Goals	Apps	Goals	Apps	Goals	Apps	Goals	Apps	Goals
Melaka United (loan)	2016	13	0	0	0	1	0	–		14	0
Total		13	0	0	0	1	0	0	0	14	0
Terengganu	2017	5	0	2	0	1	0	–		8	0
Terengganu	2018	1	0	0	0	0	0	–		1	0
Total		6	0	2	0	1	0	0	0	9	0

== Honours ==
=== Kelantan President's Cup Team ===
- Malaysia President Cup: 2010

=== Kelantan FA ===
- Malaysia Super League: 2012, 2011
- Malaysia Cup: 2012
- Malaysia FA Cup: 2012, 2013; Runner-up 2011, 2015
- Malaysia Charity Shield: 2011; Runner-up 2012, 2013

=== Melaka United ===
- Malaysia Premier League: 2016

== International career ==
In 2012, Syazwan has been called up by Ong Kim Swee for Malaysia U-23 training. The training lasted for 12 days and doing some friendly matches around Australia.
