= Azi Shahril Azmi =

Malaysian footballer

Personal information
- Full name: Azi Shahril bin Azmi
- Date of birth: 20 September 1985 (age 41)
- Place of birth: Perlis, Malaysia
- Height: 1.74 m (5 ft 8 1/2 in)
- Position: Midfielder

Senior career*
Years	Team	Apps	(Gls)
2005–2009	Perlis	52	(8)
2010	KL PLUS	25	(4)
2011	Felda United	21	(6)
2012	Johor	23	(5)
2013	Felda United	18	(3)
2014	PDRM	0	(0)
2015	Perlis	18	(2)
2016–2017	Felcra	1	(0)
2017–2018	Terengganu	5	(0)

International career^{‡}
2005–2008	Malaysia U-23	13	(0)
2006–	Malaysia	7	(0)
- * Club domestic league appearances and goals as of 26 September 2017 ‡ National team caps and goals as of 14 February 2016

Azi Shahril bin Azmi (born 20 September 1985) is a Malaysian international footballer who plays as midfielder.

== Club career ==
His high school is Sekolah Menengah Kebangsaan Putra Kangar, Perlis. Later, he was chosen to represent the team president cup Perlis before playing in the senior squad Perlis.

== International career ==
He is a member of the Malaysia National and former Malaysia Under-23 squad.

Azi made his first international senior debut against New Zealand on 23 February 2006 as a substitute. Azi was stand-in captain of the side that beat Myanmar 3–1 in the final to win the 2007 Merdeka Tournament. The original captain Shukor Adan pulled out of the game because of injury.

== Career statistics ==
As of 27 June 2018

=== Club ===
Club	Season	League		Cup		League Cup		Continental		Total	
Club	Season	Apps	Goals	Apps	Goals	Apps	Goals	Apps	Goals	Apps	Goals
Terengganu	2017	5	0	0	0	3	0	–		8	0
Terengganu	2018	0	0	0	0	0	0	–		0	0
Terengganu	Total	5	0	0	0	3	0	0	0	8	0
Career total		0	0	0	0	0	0	0	0	0	0

=== International ===
As of 28 August 2017

Appearances and goals by national team and year
National team	Year	Apps	Goals
Malaysia	2006	2	0
Malaysia	2007	1	0
Malaysia	2008	3	0
Total		6	0
