= Firdaus Faudzi =

Malaysian footballer

Personal information
- Full name: Mohd Firdaus bin Mohd Faudzi
- Date of birth: 2 August 1987 (age 39)
- Place of birth: Kedah, Malaysia
- Height: 1.70 m (5 ft 7 in)
- Position: Right back

Team information
- Current team: Kuala Lumpur Rovers
- Number: 22

Youth career
- 2006: Kedah
- 2007: Kuala Muda Naza

Senior career*
Years	Team	Apps	(Gls)
2008	Kuala Muda Naza	20	(9)
2009	Perlis	18	(8)
2010	Terengganu	9	(3)
2011	Kedah	13	(3)
2012	Felda United	7	(1)
2013–2014	Sime Darby	16	(0)
2015–2016	Felda United	29	(0)
2017	Terengganu	21	(0)
2018–2022	Kuala Lumpur	19	(0)
2023–	Kuala Lumpur Rovers	0	(0)
- * Club domestic league appearances and goals as of 28 July 2018

Mohd Firdaus bin Mohd Faudzi (born 2 August 1987 in Kedah) is a Malaysian professional footballer who plays as a right back where he captains the Malaysia A1 Semi-Pro League club Kuala Lumpur Rovers.

== Career statistics ==
=== Club ===
As of 28 July 2018

Club	Season	League		Cup		League Cup		Continental		Total	
Club	Season	Apps	Goals	Apps	Goals	Apps	Goals	Apps	Goals	Apps	Goals
Terengganu	2017	21	0	5	0	4	0	–	–	30	0
Terengganu	Total	21	0	5	0	4	0	0	0	30	0
Kuala Lumpur	2018	19	0	4	0	0	0	–	–	23	0
Kuala Lumpur	Total	19	0	4	0	0	0	0	0	23	0
Career total		0	0	0	0	0	0	0	0	0	0
