= Asrol Ibrahim =

Malaysian footballer

Personal information
- Birth name: Mohd Asrol bin Ibrahim
- Date of birth: 13 December 1986 (age 39)
- Place of birth: Kuala Terengganu, Malaysia
- Height: 1.72 m (5 ft 7 1/2 in)
- Position: Midfielder

Team information
- Current team: Harini
- Number: 13

Senior career*
Years	Team	Apps	(Gls)
2011	UiTM	0	(0)
2012–2014	Sime Darby	0	(0)
2015–2016	T-Team	43	(3)
2017	Terengganu	5	(0)
2017	Terengganu II	8	(2)
2018	Felcra	3	(0)
2020-	Harini F.C.	0	(0)
- * Club domestic league appearances and goals as of 13 July 2018

Mohd Asrol bin Ibrahim (born 13 December 1986) is a Malaysian footballer who plays for Harini F.C. in the Malaysia M3 League as a midfielder.
