= Lázaro (footballer, born 1990) =

Brazilian footballer

Lázaro Vinícius
Personal information
- Full name: Lázaro Vinícius Alves Martins
- Date of birth: 28 June 1990 (age 36)
- Place of birth: Minas Gerais, Brazil
- Height: 1.91 m (6 ft 3 in)
- Position: Centre-back

Team information
- Current team: Botafogo-PB

Youth career
- 2008–2009: Atlético Mineiro

Senior career*
Years	Team	Apps	(Gls)
2008–2012	SC Heerenveen	0	(0)
2009–2011	→ FC Emmen (loan)	3	(0)
2011	→ Vila Nova (loan)	14	(0)
2012	→ Alagoinhas (loan)	15	(0)
2013	Paulista	14	(0)
2013	Boa Esporte	1	(0)
2013–2014	Manama Club	0	(0)
2014	América de Natal	11	(0)
2015	Inter de Lages	17	(0)
2015	→ Luverdense (loan)	7	(1)
2016	→ Manama Club (loan)	0	(0)
2017	Terengganu	20	(3)
2018–2019	Bragantino	47	(2)
2018	→ CRB (loan)	5	(0)
2019	Operário Ferroviário	17	(2)
2020	Brasil de Pelotas	10	(1)
2020–2022	Hajer	71	(6)
2022–2023	Al-Jabalain	33	(1)
2023–	Botafogo-PB	0	(0)

International career
2007	Brazil U17	4	(1)
- * Club domestic league appearances and goals as of 22:00, 19 June 2019 (UTC)

Lázaro Vinícius Alves Martins (born 28 June 1990), or Lázaro is a Brazilian professional footballer who plays for Botafogo-PB as a centre-back.

== Career ==
Born in Minas Gerais, he began his career in football acting for the basic categories of Atlético Mineiro. In 2007, he competed in the U-17 World Championship for the Brazil national team. He left Brazil at the age of 18 and went to SC Heerenveen in the Netherlands.

In the years 2013 and 2014 he worked for the Manama Club in Bahrain. On July 8, 2014, with the departure of Adalberto, Lázaro was contracted by America of Christmas.

In 2015, the defender defended the Inter of Lages in the dispute of Series A of Championship Santa Catarina.
