= Alan Aciar =

Argentine professional footballer (born 1988)

Personal information
- Full name: Alan Emanuel Aciar
- Date of birth: 26 February 1988 (age 38)
- Place of birth: Buenos Aires, Argentina
- Height: 1.80 m (5 ft 11 in)
- Position: Centre back

Team information
- Current team: Independiente Chivilcoy

Youth career
- 2007–2008: Racing

Senior career*
Years	Team	Apps	(Gls)
2010–2011	San Lorenzo II		
2011–2014	Unión Villa Krause	52	(3)
2014	Sportivo Desamparados	3	(0)
2014–2015	Unión Villa Krause	12	(0)
2015–2016	Persija Jakarta	2	(0)
2017	MISC-MIFA	6	(1)
2017	Bragado	14	(1)
2019	Independiente Chivilcoy	18	(0)
2020	Cibao	2	(0)
2021–	Independiente Chivilcoy	12	(0)
- * Club domestic league appearances and goals as of 20:42, 24 March 2020 (UTC)

Alan Emanuel Aciar (born 26 February 1988) is an Argentine professional footballer who plays as a defender who plays for Independiente Chivilcoy.

== Career ==
Aciar played for the U17 team of Racing, before he went to Turkey and then Croatia. He then returned to Argentina and was without a club for six months before joining San Lorenzo. He then resigned and went to Germany to a club named Fortuna in the third division in the country.

On 14 January 2020, Dominican club Cibao FC confirmed the signing of Aciar. In 2021, Acair returned to Independiente Chivilcoy.
