= Latiff Suhaimi =

Malaysian footballer

Personal information
- Full name: Abdul Latiff bin Suhaimi
- Date of birth: 29 May 1989 (age 37)
- Place of birth: Kota Bharu, Kelantan, Malaysia
- Height: 1.80 m (5 ft 11 in)
- Position: Midfielder

Team information
- Current team: Kelantan Red Warrior
- Number: 13

Senior career*
Years	Team	Apps	(Gls)
2011	Penang	20	(0)
2012	Kedah	4	(0)
2013	T-Team	19	(4)
2014−2015	Felda United	21	(9)
2016	PDRM	14	(0)
2017−2018	Terengganu	22	(2)
2019	Selangor	12	(0)
2020−2022	Penang	29	(0)
2022	→ Kelantan (loan)	2	(1)
2023	Kelantan United	14	(0)
2024–2025	PT Athletic		
2025–	Kelantan Red Warrior		

International career^{‡}
2016–	Malaysia	2	(0)
- * Club domestic league appearances and goals ‡ National team caps and goals as of 11 January 2017

Abdul Latiff bin Suhaimi (born 29 May 1989 in Kelantan) is a Malaysian professional footballer who plays for Malaysia A1 Semi-Pro League club Kelantan Red Warrior.

== Club career ==
In October 2013, Latiff left T-Team for Felda United. In November 2017, Latiff has extended his contract with Terengganu for another year. For 2019, he sign contract with Melaka United for one year.

== International career ==
Latiff earned his first Malaysia national team cap in a friendly match against Papua New Guinea, which Malaysia lost 0–2.

== Career statistics ==
As of 27 June 2018

=== Club ===
Club	Season	League		Cup		League Cup		Continental		Total	
Club	Season	Apps	Goals	Apps	Goals	Apps	Goals	Apps	Goals	Apps	Goals
Terengganu	2017	12	2	3	1	3	0	–		18	3
Terengganu	2018	10	0	0	0	0	0	–		10	0
Terengganu	Total	22	2	3	1	3	0	0	0	28	3
Selangor	2019	0	0	0	0	0	0	–		0	0
Selangor	Total	0	0	0	0	0	0	0	0	0	0
Career total		22	2	3	1	3	0	0	0	28	3

=== International ===
As of 6 July 2018

Malaysia
Year	Apps	Goals
2016	2	0
Total	2	0

== Honours ==
Penang FC

- Malaysia Premier League: 2020
