= Suffian Rahman =

Malaysian footballer (1978–2019)

Personal information
- Full name: Mohd Suffian bin Ab Rahman Kungi Raman
- Date of birth: 23 February 1978
- Place of birth: Malacca, Malaysia
- Date of death: 17 August 2019 (aged 41)
- Place of death: Kampung Bukit Tunggal, Kuala Terengganu, Malaysia
- Height: 1.80 m (5 ft 11 in)
- Position: Goalkeeper

Senior career*
Years	Team	Apps	(Gls)
1999–2005	Negeri Sembilan	95	(0)
2005–2007	Melaka Telekom	32	(0)
2007–2008	Selangor	35	(2)
2009	Kuala Muda NAZA	14	(0)
2010	Sarawak	10	(0)
2011	Pahang	18	(0)
2012	Felda United	27	(0)
2013–2015	Sime Darby	18	(0)
2016	Felda United	1	(0)
2017–2019	Terengganu	51	(0)

International career^{‡}
2007	Malaysia	1	(0)
- * Club domestic league appearances and goals as of June 27, 2018 ‡ National team caps and goals as of January 24, 2017

Mohd Suffian bin Ab Rahman Kungi Raman (23 February 1978 – 17 August 2019) was a Malaysian footballer who last played as a goalkeeper for Terengganu.

Suffian only earned one international cap for Malaysia in the match against Cambodia after substituting for Azizon Abdul Kadir. He also was part of the Malaysian 2007 AFC Asian Cup squad but did not play any matches in the tournament.

== Career statistics ==
As of 27 June 2018

=== Club ===
Club	Season	League		Cup		League Cup		Continental		Total	
Club	Season	Apps	Goals	Apps	Goals	Apps	Goals	Apps	Goals	Apps	Goals
Terengganu	2017	10	0	1	0	5	0	–		16	0
Terengganu	2018	12	0	2	0	0	0	–		14	0
Terengganu	Total	22	0	3	0	5	0	0	0	30	0
Career total		0	0	0	0	0	0	0	0	0	0

== Death ==
Suffian died on 17 August 2019 after being hospitalized for two weeks due to a heart attack.
