= Oh Kyu-bin =

South Korean footballer (born 1992)

Personal information
- Date of birth: 4 September 1992 (age 34)
- Place of birth: South Korea
- Height: 1.90 m (6 ft 3 in)
- Position: Midfielder

Youth career
- 1999–2005: Jeonju Jochon Elementary School
- 2005–2008: Wanju Middle School
- 2008–2011: Jeonju Technical High School
- 2011–2015: Kwandong University

Senior career*
Years	Team	Apps	(Gls)
2015	Seoul E-Land FC	0	(0)
2015	→ Gyeongju HNP (loan)	0	(0)
2016	Chungju Hummel FC	21	(1)
2017	Perlis FA	10	(2)
- * Club domestic league appearances and goals as of 11:00, 18 July 2018 (UTC) ‡ National team caps and goals as of 11:00, 18 July 2018 (UTC)

- Oh Kyu-bin
- Hangul: 오규빈
- RR: O Gyubin
- MR: O Kyubin

Oh Kyu-bin (Korean: 오규빈; born 4 September 1992) is a South Korean professional footballer

== Club career ==
Oh played football for both his high school, Jeonju Technical High School and also for the Kwandong University, before joining Seoul E-Land FC. He was loaned to national league side Gyeongju HNP in 2015, although he did not make an appearance.

He then joined K League Challenge side Chungju Hummel FC, where he amassed 21 appearances, scoring once.

In 2017, Oh joined Malaysian side Perlis FA.

== Career statistics ==
=== Club ===
As of 18 July 2018.

Club	Season	League			Cup		Continental		Other		Total	
Club	Season	Division	Apps	Goals	Apps	Goals	Apps	Goals	Apps	Goals	Apps	Goals
Chungju Hummel FC	2016	K League Challenge	21	1	0	0	–		0	0	21	1
Perlis FA	2017	Malaysia Premier League	10	2	2 (Note: Appearances in the Malaysia FA Cup)	0	–		0	0	12	2
Career total			31	3	2	0	–		0	0	33	3
