= Gabriel Davis (footballer) =

Brazilian footballer (born 1989)

Personal information
- Full name: Gabriel Davis dos Santos
- Date of birth: 23 October 1989 (age 37)
- Place of birth: Venâncio Aires, Brazil
- Height: 1.82 m (5 ft 11 1/2 in)
- Position: Attacking midfielder

Team information
- Current team: Clube do Remo
- Number: 7

Senior career*
Years	Team	Apps	(Gls)
2006–2009	Juventude	123	(43)
2009–2011	Porto Alegre	73	(15)
2011	Luverdense	11	(1)
2012	Uberaba	11	(3)
2012	Boa	7	(0)
2012–2013	Santa Cruz	0	(0)
2013	BEC Tero Sasana	1	(0)
2014	Uberlândia	2	(0)
2014	Grêmio Barueri	3	(0)
2015	Villa Nova	10	(2)
2015–2016	Tupi	12	(1)
2016	URT	8	(0)
2016	Sertãozinho	5	(0)
2017	CRAC	5	(0)
2017	Terengganu	9	(3)
2018	Nongbua Pitchaya	5	(1)
2018	Udon Thani	14	(4)
2019	Quảng Nam	24	(3)
2020–2022	Manaus Futebol Clube	43	(6)
2020–2021	→ Caxias Futebol Clube (loan)	1	(0)
2022	Amazonas Futebol Clube	13	(5)
2022–	Paysandu Sport Club	19	(0)
- * Club domestic league appearances and goals as of 01:20, 06 December 2013 (UTC)

Gabriel Davis dos Santos (born October 23, 1989), commonly known as Gabriel Davis, is a Brazilian professional footballer who plays as an attacking midfielder for Paysandu Sport Club.

== Career ==
Gabriel Davis started his career with Juventude, he remained with the aforementioned club for three years while making 123 appearances and scoring 43 goals. He departed Juventude in 2009 to join Porto Alegre, he played for Porto Alegre for two seasons between 2009 and 2011 and made a total of 73 league appearances and scored 15 times. 2011 saw Gabriel Davis make a short-term move to Luverdense, before joining Uberaba and then subsequently Boa.

In late 2012 Gabriel Davis completed a transfer to Santa Cruz but left a year later as he left Brazil for the first-time to join Thai club BEC Tero Sasana, however he returned to Brazil not long after as he played just 58 minutes for BEC Tero Sasana against Ratchaburi. On his return to his homeland, he agreed to join Uberlândia but departed soon after to join Grêmio Barueri in 2014.

In 2015 Gabriel Davis signed for Villa Nova, he played 9 times and scored 2 before going on to join Tupi. For Tupi, he participated in 12 matches and scored once. In January 2016, Gabriel Davis completed a move to URT. He made his URT debut on 31 January against Cruzeiro in the 2016 Campeonato Mineiro.

...

On 3 December 2020, Gabriel Davis joined S.E.R. Caxias on half of season in 2020-2021 Campeonato Brasileiro Série D. On 5 December 2020, he made his official S.E.R. Caxias appearance on bench and debut in 71 minute in the first leg of round 32 vs Mirassol FC.

On 11 January 2021, Gabriel Davis return Manaus Futebol Clube. In the Quarter-Finals of 2020 Copa Verde, on 8 February, he scored 1 goal (59' minute second leg) in the winning match vs Paysandu Sport Club, his club reach to Semi-Finals vs Clube do Remo. On 31 March, he scored a winning goal in 2-1 home victory vs Sao Raimundo Esporte Clube (AM) in round 4 of Campeonato Amazonense de Futebol de 2021. On 26 Jun, he scored the first goal in winning game against Tombense Futebol Clube in group A - Serie C.

On 2 December 2021, Gabriel Davis joined Amazonas Futebol Clube. He played 13 games and had 5 goals, 1 assist.

On 11 May 2022, Gabriel Davis joined Paysandu Sport Club. On 19 November 2022, his team won 2022 Copa Verde.

== Achievements ==
=== Club ===
Boa Esporte Clube

- Taca Minas Gerais: : (gold) Winners : 2012

Quang Nam FC

- Vietnamese Cup: : (silver) Runner-up : 2019

Manaus Futebol Clube

- Campeonato Amazonense: : (gold) Winners : 2021

Paysandu Sport Club

- Copa Verde: : (gold) Winners : 2022
