= Ridzuan Abdunloh =

Malaysian footballer

Personal information
- Full name: Mohd Ridzuan bin Abdunloh
- Date of birth: 23 February 1994 (age 32)
- Place of birth: Jitra, Kedah, Malaysia
- Height: 1.73 m (5 ft 8 in)
- Position: Right winger

Team information
- Current team: Piuu fc
- Number: 13

Youth career
- 2008–2010: Bukit Jalil Sports School

Senior career*
Years	Team	Apps	(Gls)
2011–2013	Harimau Muda B	23	(8)
2014–2015	Harimau Muda A	15	(6)
2016–2017	Felda United	16	(0)
2017	Terengganu	6	(1)
2019	Negeri Sembilan	0	(0)
- * Club domestic league appearances and goals as of 26 September 2017

Mohd Ridzuan bin Abdunloh (born 23 February 1994) is a Malaysian professional footballer.

== Club career ==
=== Harimau Muda B ===
A product of Bukit Jalil Sport School, Ridzuan joins Harimau Muda B in 2011. Ridzuan scored goal in S.League against Warriors FC. He also scored twice against Tanjong Pagar United. In his first S.League season, Ridzuan was Harimau Muda B top scorers with seven goals.

=== Harimau Muda A ===
Ridzuan was promoted to Harimau Muda A for 2014 season. On 8 March 2014, he scored goal in a 3–3 draw against Moreton Bay United. On 24 May, he scored two goals in a 4–0 win against Western Pride.

=== Felda United ===
As Harimau Muda teams was disbanded in November 2015, Ridzuan was set to return to his state team, Kedah FA, but discovered that they already registered all their players for the next season, so Felda United made an agreement with Kedah for him to join them for the 2016 season.
