= Issey Nakajima-Farran =

Canadian soccer player (born 1984)

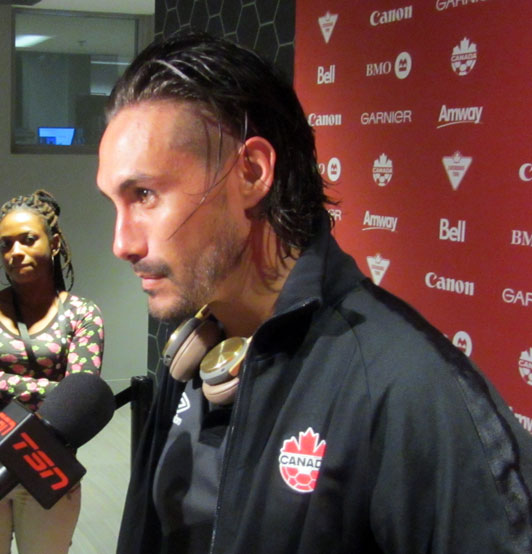
- Nakajima-Farran in 2015

Personal information
- Full name: Issey Morgan Nakajima-Farran
- Date of birth: 16 May 1984 (age 42)
- Place of birth: Calgary, Alberta, Canada
- Height: 1.78 m (5 ft 10 in)
- Positions: Winger; forward

Youth career
- 1993–1994: Verdy Kawasaki
- 1995–1997: Crystal Palace
- 2000–2002: Tokyo Verdy

Senior career*
Years	Team	Apps	(Gls)
2003–2006	Albirex Niigata	0	(0)
2004–2006	→ Albirex Niigata (S) (loan)	45	(26)
2006–2007	Vejle	44	(16)
2007–2009	Nordsjælland	46	(13)
2009–2011	Horsens	55	(11)
2011–2012	Brisbane Roar	23	(4)
2012–2013	AEK Larnaca	10	(1)
2013–2014	→ Alki Larnaca (loan)	15	(3)
2014	Toronto FC	5	(2)
2014	Montreal Impact	13	(0)
2015	Suburense	2	(2)
2015–2017	Terengganu	61	(32)
2018	Pahang	10	(6)
2019	Pacific FC	17	(1)
2021	UE Tàrrega	12	(3)
2021–2023	Cubelles	39	(24)
Total		397	(144)

International career
2005	Singapore U21	1	(1)
2006–2016	Canada	38	(1)
- * Club domestic league appearances and goals

Issey Morgan Nakajima-Farran (Japanese: 中島ファラン一生; born 16 May 1984) is a Canadian former professional soccer player who played as a winger or forward.

Nakajima-Farran has played professionally in Japan, Singapore, Denmark, Australia, Cyprus, Canada, Malaysia, and Spain and represented Singapore at youth international level and Canada at senior international level.

== Early life ==
Nakajima-Farran was born in Calgary in Canada, to an English-Canadian father who was born in Rhodesia, and a Japanese mother. He moved with his family from Calgary to Tokyo, Japan at age three, and then from Tokyo to London, England at age ten.

Nakajima-Farran began playing at youth level with Verdy Kawasaki. After moving to England, he joined the Crystal Palace Academy. At age 16, he returned to Japan and signed a youth contract with Tokyo Verdy (which re-branded from Verdy Kawasaki, his former youth club).

== Club career ==
=== Albirex Niigata ===
In 2003, Nakajima-Farran began his professional soccer career after signing with J2 League's Albirex Niigata.

In 2004, he was loaned to their Singaporean satellite club Albirex Niigata Singapore in the S.League, playing for two seasons. In 2005, he was named the S.League Young Player of the Year.

=== Denmark ===
In the winter transfer window of 2006, Nakajima-Farran had trials with English sides Millwall, Portsmouth for a month and Reading for a couple of days.

In the spring of 2006, he signed with Danish First Division team Vejle Boldklub. He helped the club win the championship and gain promotion to the top league in the Danish football system, the Superliga. In February 2007, he extended his contract until the summer of 2009.

In July 2007, he signed with Danish Superliga side FC Nordsjælland on a four-year contract. On 17 July 2007, he made his debut for the club and scored his first goal in a 1-0 victory over FC Copenhagen.

In the summer of 2009, Nakajima-Frarran went on a trial with Eredivisie team De Graafschap. In September 2009, he signed with second tier side AC Horsens. In his first season, he helped the club earn promotion to the first tier. In August 2011, he agreed to a mutual termination of the remainder of his contract.

=== Australia ===
In late August 2011, Nakajima-Farran signed a one-year contract with A-League club Brisbane Roar. He scored his first goal for Brisbane and set up another a 7–1 victory over Adelaide United on 28 October 2011. In November 2011, he scored two goals in a 4-0 victory over Perth Glory, earning Man of the Match honours, with the victory setting set a new Australian sports team record of 36 unbeaten games, which dated back to the previous season.

=== Cyprus ===
In July 2012, Nakajima-Farran signed a two-year deal with Cypriot First Division side AEK Larnaca. In January 2013, he was loaned to Alki Larnaca for the remainder of the 2012-13 season.

=== First stint in Canada ===
In January 2014, Nakajima-Farran went on trial with Canadian club Toronto FC of Major League Soccer. On 28 March 2014, he officially signed a contract with the club. He scored his first goal for Toronto FC on 5 April against the Columbus Crew, in a 2–0 away victory.

On 16 May 2014, Nakajima-Farran was traded to the Montreal Impact along with allocation money in exchange for Collen Warner. At the end of the 2014 season, he was waived and released by the club.

=== Malaysia ===
Following his release from MLS, Nakajima-Farran joined CF Suburense in the Segona Catalana, the sixth tier of the Spanish football league system to stay fit and be close to his family.

In April 2015, he signed with Malaysia Super League club Terengganu. After his first season, the club was relegated to the second tier Malaysia Premier League and the club was planning to release him, but he chose to remain with the club and helped them to secure promotion back to the first tier with a second place finish in 2017. In November 2017, he chose to depart the club.

In May 2018, he signed with Pahang.

=== Second stint in Canada ===
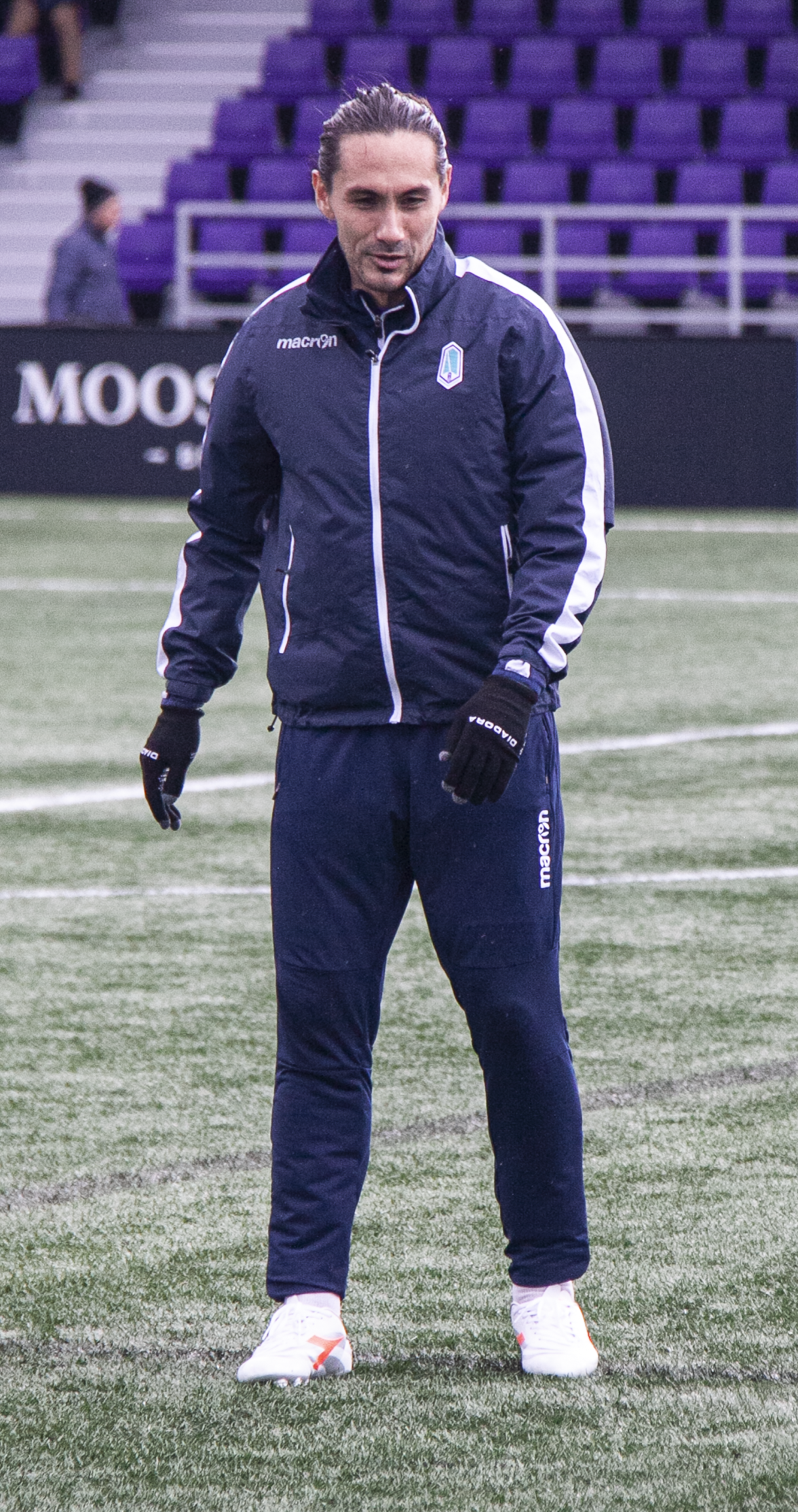
Nakajima-Farran in 2019 with Pacific FC

In March 2019, Nakajima-Farran signed with Canadian Premier League club Pacific FC, ahead of their inaugural season. He made his debut on 28 April against the HFX Wanderers, in a substitute appearance. He scored his first goal on 1 July against Cavalry FC on a free kick.

In January 2020, he joined CCB LFC United of the Vancouver Metro Soccer League club CCB LFC United at the senior amateur level.

=== Spain ===
In March 2021, he signed for Spanish club UE Tàrrega in the fifth tier Primera Catalana.

He joined CF Cubelles in the seventh tier Segona Catalana later in 2021, after finishing the 2020-21 season with Tàrrega. In July 2022, he extended his contract for another season.

In April 2023, he retired from playing professionally.

In March 2024, he began playing in the seven-a-side Kings League with Rayo de Barcelona.

== International career ==
Nakajima-Farran holds Canadian, Japanese, and British citizenship. His father was born in the former Rhodesia and is English-Canadian, his mother was born in Japan.

=== Singapore ===
In 2005, Nakajima-Farran was invited to play a match with the Singapore U21 national team against Japan U23, earning man of the match honours after scoring a goal and assisting another in a 2-2, before defeating Japan in penalty kicks, with Nakajima-Farran converting his kick. He had hoped the performance could lead to a call-up to Japan, however, but the Japanese coach stated he was not interested in calling him up. There was interest in him becoming a full international for Singapore, with him being eligible for a Singaporean passport after having played in the country for two years.

=== Canada ===
In November 2006, Nakajima-Farran was called up to Canada for the first time ahead of a friendly against Hungary. He made his debut in the match on 12 November 2016. He scored his first international goal on 15 June 2008 in a World Cup qualification match against St. Vincent and the Grenadines. He earned a total of 38 caps for Canada and played at three editions of the CONCACAF Gold Cup (2007, 2009, and 2013) and was named an alternate for the 2011 edition.

== Personal life ==
He is the brother of Paris Nakajima-Farran, who was also a professional player.

Nakajima-Farran is also an artist, having taken up painting at age 13 when he broke his ankle, and has sold over two dozen paintings.

After his retirement from playing, he bought a yacht to live on in Barcelona, after also previously living on a boat on Vancouver Island while playing for Pacific FC in 2019.

== Career statistics ==
=== Club ===
Appearances and goals by club, season and competition
Club	Season	League			National cup		League cup		Continental (Note: Includes UEFA Cup and CONCACAF Champions League.)		Total	
Club	Season	Division	Apps	Goals	Apps	Goals	Apps	Goals	Apps	Goals	Apps	Goals
Nordsjælland	2008–09	Danish Superliga	16	1	0	0	0	0	3	0	19	1
Horsens	2010–11	Danish Superliga	28	4	0	0	0	0	0	0	28	4
Horsens	2011–12	Danish Superliga	3	1	0	0	0	0	0	0	3	1
Horsens	Total		31	5	0	0	0	0	0	0	31	5
Brisbane Roar	2011–12	A-League	23	4	0	0	0	0	0	0	23	4
AEK	2012–13	Cypriot First Division	10	1	0	0	0	0	0	0	10	1
Alki (loan)	2012–13	Cypriot First Division	15	3	2	0	0	0	0	0	17	3
Toronto FC	2014	Major League Soccer	5	2	2	0	0	0	0	0	7	2
Montreal Impact	2014	Major League Soccer	13	0	0	0	0	0	2	0	15	0
Terengganu	2015	Malaysia Super League	12	9	2	1	5	3	—		19	13
Terengganu	2016	Malaysia Super League	18	7	0	0	0	0	—		18	7
Terengganu	2017	Malaysia Premier League	18	8	5	1	3	2	—		26	11
Terengganu	Total		48	24	7	2	8	5	0	0	63	31
Pahang	2018	Malaysia Super League	10	6	2	0	0	0	—		12	6
Pacific FC	2019	Canadian Premier League	18	1	2	0	0	0	—		20	1
Tàrrega	2020–21	Primera Catalana	12	3	–		–		—		12	3
Cubelles	2021–22	Segona Catalana	23	15	–		–		—		23	15
Cubelles	2022–23	Segona Catalana	16	9	–		–		—		16	9
Cubelles	Total		39	24	0	0	0	0	0	0	39	24
Career total			240	74	15	2	8	5	5	0	268	81

=== International ===
Appearances and goals by national team and year
National team	Year	Apps	Goals
Canada	2006	1	0
Canada	2007	7	0
Canada	2008	7	1
Canada	2009	3	0
Canada	2010	4	0
Canada	2011	1	0
Canada	2013	7	0
Canada	2014	3	0
Canada	2015	4	0
Canada	2016	1	0
Total		38	1

Scores and results list Canada's goal tally first, score column indicates score after each Nakajima-Farran goal.

List of international goals scored by Issey Nakajima-Farran
No.	Date	Venue	Opponent	Score	Result	Competition	Ref.
1	20 June 2008	Arnos Vale Stadium, Kingstown, St. Vincent & the Grenadines	Saint Vincent and the Grenadines	1–0	3–0	2010 FIFA World Cup qualification	

== Honours ==
Albirex Niigata

- J2 League: 2003

Vejle Boldklub

- Danish First Division: 2005–06

AC Horsens

- Danish First Division: 2009–10

Brisbane Roar

- A-League: 2011–12

Montreal Impact

- Canadian Championship: 2014

Individual

- Singapore 'Young Player of the Year': 2005
- PFAM Player of the Month: August 2015, October 2015
