= Souleymane Konaté =

Malian footballer

Personal information
- Full name: Souleymane Konaté
- Date of birth: 20 September 1989 (age 37)
- Place of birth: Bamako, Mali
- Height: 1.82 m (5 ft 11 1/2 in)
- Position: Centre back

Team information
- Current team: PDRM FA
- Number: 20

Senior career*
Years	Team	Apps	(Gls)
2013–2014	Stade Malien		
2014–2015	Al-Hilal Club		
2016–	PDRM FA	38	(2)

International career^{‡}
2013–2014	Mali	6	(0)
- * Club domestic league appearances and goals as of 19 September 2017 ‡ National team caps and goals as of 31 July 2016

Souleymane Konaté (born 20 September 1989) is a Malian professional footballer who plays as a defender for Malaysian club PDRM FA. He formerly play for Stade Malien.

== International career ==
In January 2014, coach Djibril Dramé, invited him to be a part of the Mali squad for the 2014 African Nations Championship. He helped the team to the quarter finals where they lost to Zimbabwe by two goals to one.
