= 2018 Felda United F.C. season =

Felda United
2018 season
- President: Ab Ghani Mohd Ali
- Manager: Jamaludin Ahmad
- Head Coach: B. Sathianathan
- Stadium: Tun Abdul Razak Stadium (Capacity: 25,000)
- Premier League: Champions
- FA Cup: Quarter-finals
- Malaysia Cup: Quarter-finals
- Top goalscorer: League: Thiago Fernandes (14); All: Thiago Fernandes (22)

The 2018 season was Felda United's 12th competitive season and 1st season in the Malaysia Premier League since relegated in 2017. The season was a success, the club was promoted to the Malaysia Super League after only one-year absence.

== Pre-season and friendlies ==
Date	Opponents	H / A	Result F–A	Scorers
20 December 2017	MOF	H	1–0	Hadin
23 December 2017	UKM	H	3–1	Christie, Wan Zack (2)
27 December 2017	MIFA	A	Cancelled	
30 December 2017	PKNP	H	2–0	Thiago Junio, Safwan
6 January 2018	ATM	H	6–0	Wan Zack 17', Fortunato 30', Thiago Augusto (2) 37', 64', Thiago Junio 74', Christie 86'
12 January 2018	MIFA	H	3–1	Thiago Augusto (3) 3', 41', 57'
17 January 2018	Sarawak	H	4–1	Thiago Augusto (2) 10', 45', Alif 87', Ramsay 90'
20 January 2018	Felcra	H	1–0	Shukor 24'
24 January 2018	Rydelmere	H	3–1	

== Competitions ==
=== Malaysia Premier League ===
Date	Opponents	H / A	Result F–A	Scorers	Attendance	League position
2 February 2018	UKM	A	2–1	Ramsay 32', Wan Zack 67'	??	3rd
6 February 2018	PDRM	A	6–2	Fortunato (3) 8', 44', 72', Shukor 40', Syamim 49', Ramsay 55'	??	1st
12 February 2018	Penang	H	3–0	Fortunato (2) 8', 44', Christie 85'	??	1st
26 February 2018	Johor Darul Ta'zim II	A	4–1	Fortunato 8', Wan Zack 11', Fernandes 68', Christie 86'	??	1st
10 April 2018	Terengganu II	A	2–0	Shukor 45+3', Fernandes 64 (pen.)'	??	1st
14 April 2018	Sabah	A	1–1	Wan Zack 10'	??	1st
23 April 2018	Felcra	H	1–1	Fernandes 3'	??	1st
26 April 2018	Sarawak	H	3–2	Fernandes (2) 45', 87', Shukor 67'	??	1st
1 May 2018	MISC-MIFA	A	3–2	Fernandes 5', Christie 33', Hadin 90+6'	??	1st
4 May 2018	UiTM	H	2–0	Fernandes 61', Wan Zack 82'	??	1st
12 May 2018	MISC-MIFA	H	0–3		??	1st
21 May 2018	UiTM	A	4–1	Wan Zack 39' Fernandes 41', Aquino 74', Christie 82'	??	1st
24 May 2018	Sabah	H	1–0	Wan Zack 45+3'	??	1st
2 June 2018	Felcra	A	1–1	Christie 76'	??	1st
8 June 2018	Terengganu II	H	3–2	Christie 46', Fernandes (2) 64', 72'	??	1st
27 June 2018	Johor Darul Ta'zim II	H	2–2	Fernandes (2) 86', 90+5'	??	1st
13 June 2018	UKM	H	0–0		??	1st
17 July 2018	Sarawak	A	3–1	Fortunato (2) 7', 68' (pen.), Fernandes 40'	??	1st
21 July 2018	PDRM	H	2–2	Fernandes 37' (pen.), Fortunato 53'	??	1st
27 July 2018	Penang	A	1–1	Fortunato 75'	??	1st

Pos	Team	Pld	W	D	L	GF	GA	GD	Pts	Promotion, qualification or relegation
1	Felda United (C, P)	20	12	7	1	44	24	+20	43	Promotion to 2019 Malaysia Super League
2	Felcra	20	9	7	4	30	24	+6	34	Withrew from Premier League and dissolved.
3	MIFA (P)	20	9	5	6	36	26	+10	32	Promotion to 2019 Malaysia Super League
4	Johor Darul Ta'zim II	20	8	6	6	28	23	+5	30	
5	PDRM	20	8	5	7	28	31	−3	29	

Updated to match(es) played on 30 December 2018. Source: FAM, FMLLP
Rules for classification: 1) Points; 2) Goal difference; 3) Number of goals scored.
(C) Champions; (P) Promoted

=== Malaysia FA Cup ===
Date	Round	Opponents	H / A	Result F–A	Scorers	Attendance
9 March 2018	Round 2	Felcra	A	5–2	Fernandes (2) 45+1' (pen.), 65', Shukor 72', Hadin 84', Fortunato 90+4' (pen.)	??
16 March 2018	Round 3	UKM	H	2–1	Fortunato 14', Fernandes 40'	??
7 April 2018	Quarter-final first leg	PKNP	A	1–0	Fernandes 50'	??
20 April 2018	Quarter-final second leg	PKNP	H	2–1	Wan Zack 26'	??

=== Malaysia Cup ===
==== Group stage ====
Date	Opponents	H / A	Result F–A	Scorers	Attendance	Round
5 August 2018	Melaka United	H	0–0		??	1
12 August 2018	PDRM	A	5–0	Fernandes (3) 54', 80', 90+1', Fortunato 57' (pen.), Shukor 71'	??	2
19 August 2018	PKNS	A	3–2	Ramsay 38', Fortunato 68', Afiq 81'	??	3
28 August 2018	PKNS	H	0–1			4
1 September 2018	PDRM	H	2–0	Fernandes 66', Fortunato 90+3',		5
15 September 2018	Melaka United	A	6–1	Zahril Azri 55'		6
21 September 2018	PKNS	H	1–2	Fortunato 56'		Quarter-finals

Pos	Team	Pld	W	D	L	GF	GA	GD	Pts	Qualification	PKNS	FEL	MEL	PDRM
1	PKNS	6	4	1	1	18	9	+9	13	Advance to knockout stage	—	2–3	2–1	5–0
2	FELDA United	6	3	1	2	11	9	+2	10	Advance to knockout stage	0–1	—	0–0	2–0
3	Melaka United	6	2	3	1	18	9	+9	9		3–3	6–1	—	2–2
4	PDRM	6	0	1	5	5	25	−20	1		2–5	0–5	1–6	—

Updated to match(es) played on 15 September 2018. Source: FAM FMLLP

== Statistics ==
=== Appearances and goals ===
As of 21 September 2018

No.	Pos.	Name	League		FA Cup		Malaysia Cup		Total		Discipline	
No.	Pos.	Name	Apps	Goals	Apps	Goals	Apps	Goals	Apps	Goals	Yellow card	Red card
1	GK	(Malaysia) Kalamullah Al-Hafiz	1	0	0	0	0	0	1	0	0	0
3	DF	(Malaysia) Nor Fazly Alias	4(1)	0	1	0	3	0	8(1)	0	0	0
5	DF	(Malaysia) Ali Imran Alimi	1	0	0	0	0	0	1	0	0	0
6	MF	(Malaysia) Danial Amier	4(1)	0	0	0	1(1)	0	5(2)	0	0	0
7	MF	(Malaysia) Hadin Azman	4(10)	2	0(4)	1	0(3)	0	4(17)	3	0	0
8	MF	(Malaysia) Khairu Azrin	11(3)	0	2	0	3(3)	0	15(6)	0	2	0
9	FW	(Brazil) Thiago Augusto	18(2)	14	4	4	5	4	27(2)	22	1	0
10	FW	(Brazil) Gilberto Fortunato	13(5)	10	4	2	7	4	24(5)	16	2	0
11	MF	(Malaysia) Wan Zack Haikal	15(3)	6	4	1	0	0	19(3)	7	4	1
12	DF	(Malaysia) Shukor Adan (c)	19(1)	3	4	1	7	1	30(1)	5	4	0
13	MF	(Malaysia) Syamim Yahya	5(2)	1	0	0	3(2)	0	8(4)	1	1	0
14	DF	(Malaysia) Azreen Zulkafali	4(1)	0	0	0	5	0	9(1)	0	0	0
16	MF	(Malaysia) Stuart Wark	12	0	2(1)	0	3(1)	0	17(2)	0	0	0
17	MF	(Philippines) Iain Ramsay	16(2)	2	4	0	6(1)	1	25(3)	3	2	0
18	DF	(Malaysia) Irwan Fadzli	0	0	0	0	0	0	0	0	0	0
19	MF	(Malaysia) Christie Jayaseelan	12(8)	6	1(2)	0	5(1)	0	18(11)	6	0	0
20	DF	(Malaysia) Wan Amirul Afiq	12(1)	0	4	0	2(4)	1	18(5)	1	2	1
21	DF	(Malaysia) K. Prabakaran	10(3)	0	1	0	3	0	14(3)	0	0	0
23	DF	(Malaysia) Safwan Hashim	0(1)	0	0	0	0	0	0(1)	0	0	0
26	DF	(Brazil) Thiago Junio	14(1)	1	2	0	4(1)	0	20(2)	1	4	0
28	MF	(Malaysia) Alif Yusof	15(2)	0	4	0	5	0	24(2)	0	5	0
30	GK	(Malaysia) Farizal Harun	18	0	4	0	6	0	28	0	1	0
33	GK	(Malaysia) Azri Ghani	1	0	0	0	1	0	2	0	0	0
34	DF	(Malaysia) Tasnim Fitri Nasir	0	0	0	0	0	0	0	0	0	0
35	MF	(Malaysia) Zahril Azri	2(5)	0	0	0	7	1	9(5)	1	3	0
36	DF	(Malaysia) Anwar Ibrahim	4(1)	0	0	0	0	0	4(1)	0	0	0
37	FW	(Malaysia) Syahmi Zamri	0	0	0	0	0(1)	0	0(1)	0	0	0
Players who left the club during season or on loan
29	MF	(Malaysia) Curran Ferns	8(2)	0	3(1)	0	0	0	11(3)	0	1	0
24	GK	(Malaysia) Ilham Amirullah	0	0	0	0	0	0	0	0	0	0

=== Clean sheets ===
No.	Pos.	Name	League	FA Cup	Malaysia Cup	Total
1	GK	(Malaysia) Kalamullah Al-Hafiz	0	0	0	0
30	GK	(Malaysia) Farizal Harun	4	0	3	7
33	GK	(Malaysia) Azri Ghani	0	0	0	0

== Transfers ==
=== In ===
1st leg

Date	Pos.	Name	From	Fee
2 December 2017	MF	(Malaysia) Khairu Azrin	(Malaysia) PKNS	Undisclosed
2 December 2017	MF	(Malaysia) Azreen Zulkafali	(Malaysia) PKNS	Undisclosed
6 December 2017	MF	(Malaysia) Syamim Yahya	(Malaysia) Pahang	Undisclosed
6 December 2017	MF	(Malaysia) Christie Jayaseelan	(Malaysia) Pahang	Undisclosed
7 December 2017	DF	(Brazil) Thiago Junio	(Malaysia) Perak	Undisclosed
20 December 2017	FW	(Brazil) Gilberto Fortunato	(Malaysia) PKNP	Undisclosed
3 January 2018	MF	(Philippines) Iain Ramsay	(Philippines) Ceres–Negros	Undisclosed

=== Out ===
1st leg

2nd leg

Date	Pos.	Name	To	Fee
1 June 2018	MF	(Malaysia) Curran Ferns	(Thailand) Sukhothai	Undisclosed
