= 2018 Felcra F.C. season =

Felcra
2018 season
- President: Ismail Kassim
- Manager: Fauzi Tahir
- Head coach: Tarcísio Pugliese
- Stadium: Shah Alam Stadium
- Premier League: 2nd (promoted)
- FA Cup: Second round
- Malaysia Cup: Group stage
- Top goalscorer: League: Casagrande (20); All: Casagrande (21)
Home colours	Away colours	Third colours

The 2018 season is Felcra Football Club's 6th season in club history and 1st season in the Malaysia Premier League since being promoted to the Malaysia FAM League in 2017.

== Club ==
=== Coaching staff ===
Position	Name
Patron	(Malaysia) Vacant
President	(Malaysia) Ismail Kassim
Vice President	(Malaysia) Hazian Murad
Manager	(Malaysia) Fauzi Tahir
Assistant manager	(Malaysia) Shahriman Teruna Isa
Director of Football	(Malaysia) Norizan Bakar
Head coach	(Brazil) Tarcísio Pugliese
Assistant coach 1	(Malaysia) Rosle Md. Derus
Assistant coach 2	(Malaysia) Mohd Fadzli Saari
Goalkeeping coach	(Malaysia) Megat Amir Faisal
Fitness coach	(Malaysia) Mohd. Hafizuddin Ramli
Head of physio	(Malaysia) Mohd. Lutfi Abdul Samad
Physio	(Malaysia) Muhammad Iqbal Afiq bin Azmi
Assistant physio	(Malaysia) Ibrahim Md. Tia
Kitman	(Malaysia) Masri Mustaffa
Security Officer	(Malaysia) Mohd. Najib Miswan
Security Officer 2	(Malaysia) Mohammad Azrul Tajudin
Media Officer	(Malaysia) Zamri Zainon Abidin

=== Kit manufacturers and financial sponsor ===
Nation	Corporation
Main sponsors
(Malaysia)	FELCRA Berhad
Shirt sponsors
(Malaysia)	Kika

== Player information ==
=== Full squad ===
No.	Name	Age	Nat.	Position	Join	Signed From	D.O.B	Notes
Goalkeepers
1	Muhd Syamim Othman	28	(Malaysia)	GK	2017	(Selangor) Cheras Premier F.C.	6/1/1990	
22	Fadzley Rahim	31	(Malaysia)	GK	2018	(Selangor) Petaling Jaya Rangers F.C.	22/7/1987	
30	Mohd Yatim Abdullah	25	(Malaysia)	GK	2018	Negeri Sembilan FA	12/12/1992	
Defenders
2	Syahmi Azhar Saipol Bahri	20	(Malaysia)	LB	2018	Johor Darul Ta'zim IV F.C.	3/2/1998	
3	Léo Carioca	32	(Brazil)	CB	2018	(Brazil) Clube Náutico Capibaribe	6/1/1986	Import
5	Shahrom Kalam	33	(Malaysia)	CB	2018	Perak FA	15/9/1985	
7	Che Mohd Arif Che Kamarudin	23	(Malaysia)	CB	2018	(Kuala Lumpur) Sime Darby F.C.	16/1/1995	
15	Zainuddin Abidin	28	(Malaysia)	LB / CB	2018	(Kuala Lumpur) Sime Darby F.C.	31/12/1988	
16	Mohd Fazliata Taib	33	(Malaysia)	RB / CB	2016	Negeri Sembilan FA	10/12/1985	
24	Nizam Abu Bakar	34	(Malaysia)	RB	2018	(Selangor) PKNS F.C.	16/9/1984	
26	Nor Ubaidullah Rahman	25	(Malaysia)	RB	2016	(Selangor) PKNS F.C.	1/11/1993	
29	Mohd Alif Shamsudin	29	(Malaysia)	RB / DM	2018	(Malacca) Melaka United	1/2/1989	
32	Al-Amin Abdullah	28	(Malaysia)	CB	2018	Free agent	20/7/1990	
Midfielders
4	Hazeman Abdul Karim	29	(Malaysia)	DM / CM / LW	2018	Terengganu F.C. I	1/10/1989	
6	David Laly	27	(Indonesia)	DM / CM	2018	(Indonesia) PS Barito Putera	7/11/1991	Import
8	Badrul Hisham Morris	31	(Malaysia)	DM / CM	2018	Terengganu F.C. II	6/7/1987	
11	Dzulfahmi Abdul Hadi	24	(Malaysia)	RW / LW	2018	(Kuala Lumpur) Sime Darby F.C.	25/8/1994	
13	Asrol Ibrahim	32	(Malaysia)	DM / CM	2018	Terengganu F.C. II	13/12/1986	
14	Endrick Santos	23	(Brazil)	CM / AM	2018	(Romania) FC Botoșani	7/3/1995	Import
17	Mohd Fandi Othman	26	(Malaysia)	LW / LB	2018	Johor Darul Ta'zim II F.C.	25/4/1992	
20	Ali Amirun Kamarudin	21	(Malaysia)	LW / LB	2018	Penang FA U21	28/11/1997	
21	Ammar Akhmal Alias	19	(Malaysia)	CM / AM	2017	(Kuala Lumpur) SSBJ U17	10/1/1999	
23	Farhan Mustafa	27	(Malaysia)	CM / AM	2016	Free agent	14/2/1991	
25	Mohd Haziq Mu'iz	22	(Malaysia)	CM / AM	2016	Perlis FA	24/12/1996	
28	Muhammad Lukman Hakim Zulkepli	20	(Malaysia)	RW / LW	2018	(Malacca) Melaka United U19	22/6/1998	
31	Mohd Aznorayll Alazaman	24	(Malaysia)	RW / LW	2018	(Sabah) Kinabatangan FA	1994	
33	Mohamad Hafiz Ismail	28	(Malaysia)	CM	2017	(Pahang) Jerantut FA	1990	
34	Mohd Arfiyansah Abdul Jafar	28	(Malaysia)	DM / CM	2018	(Sabah) KDMM F.C.	30/3/1990	
Forwards
9	Mohd Firdaus Azizul	30	(Malaysia)	ST	2016	(Kuala Lumpur) Sime Darby F.C.	3/1/1988	
10	Nazrul Kamaruzaman	25	(Malaysia)	ST	2018	(Kuala Lumpur) Sime Darby F.C.	29/3/1993	
12	Abdul Azim Rahim	21	(Malaysia)	ST	2018	(Pahang) Felda United	1/1/1997	
18	Mohd Arip Amiruddin	26	(Malaysia)	ST	2018	(Selangor) Petaling Jaya Rangers F.C.	15/12/1992	
19	Casagrande	32	(Brazil)	ST	2018	(Brazil) Boa Esporte Clube	28/7/1986	Import
27	Mohd Rasyid Aya	28	(Malaysia)	ST / AM	2018	Penang FA	4/6/1990	

== Transfers ==
=== January ===
In

No.	Pos.	Name	Age	From	Notes
2	DF	(Malaysia) Syahmi Azhar Saipol Bahri	20	Johor Darul Ta'zim IV F.C.	
3	DF	(Brazil) Léo Carioca	32	(Brazil) Clube Náutico Capibaribe	Import
4	MF	(Malaysia) Hazeman Abdul Karim	29	Terengganu F.C. I	
5	DF	(Malaysia) Shahrom Kalam	33	Perak FA	
6	MF	(Indonesia) David Laly	27	(Indonesia) PS Barito Putera	Import
7	MF	(Malaysia) Mohd Arfiyansah Abdul Jafar	28	(Sabah) KDMM F.C.	
8	MF	(Malaysia) Badrul Hisham Morris	31	Terengganu F.C. II	
10	FW	(Malaysia) Nazrul Kamaruzaman	25	(Kuala Lumpur) Sime Darby F.C.	
11	FW	(Malaysia) Dzulfahmi Abdul Hadi	24	(Kuala Lumpur) Sime Darby F.C.	
13	MF	(Malaysia) Asrol Ibrahim	32	Terengganu F.C. II	
14	MF	(Brazil) Endrick Santos	23	(Romania) FC Botoșani	Import
15	DF	(Malaysia) Zainuddin Abidin	28	(Kuala Lumpur) Sime Darby F.C.	
17	MF	(Malaysia) Mohd Fandi Othman	26	Johor Darul Ta'zim II F.C.	
18	FW	(Malaysia) Mohd Arip Amiruddin	26	(Selangor) Petaling Jaya Rangers F.C.	
19	FW	(Brazil) Casagrande	32	(Brazil) Boa Esporte Clube	Import
20	MF	(Malaysia) Mohd Aznorayll Alazaman	24	(Sabah) Kinabatangan FA	

Out

No.	Pos.	Name	Age	To	Notes
2	FW	(Malaysia) K. Ravindran	29		
4	MF	(Malaysia) Mohd Firdaus Zulkaffli	23	Perlis FA	
5	DF	(Malaysia) Mohd Alif Shamsudin	29	(Malacca) Melaka United	Loan Return
6	MF	(Malaysia) Wan Zulhilmi Wan Mustaffa	24	Perlis FA	
7	MF	(Malaysia) Thanabalan Nadarajah	23	Negeri Sembilan FA	Loan Return
8	MF	(Malaysia) Haikal Nazri	25	Kelantan FA	
10	FW	(Malaysia) Mohd Syafiq Azmi	24	(Terengganu) Hanelang F.C.	
11	DF	(Malaysia) Fiqri Azwan Ghazali	26		
12	DF	(Malaysia) Muhammad Firdaus Paris	27	Free agent	
13	DF	(Malaysia) Muhd Syahrizal Shaharin	23	Perlis FA	
14	MF	(Malaysia) Shazuan Ashraf Mathews	26		
15	FW	(Malaysia) Mohd Syazwan Nordin	25	Perlis FA	
17	MF	(Malaysia) Muhd Muzaimir Abdul Hadi	23	Sarawak FA	
18	MF	(Malaysia) Mohd Shukor Azmi	25	(Perak) PKNP F.C.	
19	MF	(Malaysia) Nashrul Shazrin Roslan	26	Perlis FA	
20	MF	(Malaysia) Mohd Fadzli Saari	35	Retired	
22	GK	(Malaysia) Muhd Fakhrul Ikram Azahari	25	(Kelantan) MPKB-BRI U-BeS F.C.	
24	DF	(Malaysia) Muhd Hafizi Mat Podzi	23	Perlis FA	
27	FW	(Malaysia) Mohd Ikmal Ibrahim	23	Perlis FA	
28	DF	(Malaysia) Adib Zainudin	23	(Selangor) UiTM F.C.	Loan Return
29	GK	(Malaysia) S.Vishnu Ruban Nair	24	(Selangor) Petaling Jaya Rangers F.C.	
30	FW	(Malaysia) Mohd Rahizi Mohd Rasib	24	Negeri Sembilan FA	Loan Return

== Competitions ==
=== Malaysia Premier League ===
Date	Opponents	H / A	Result F–A	Scorers	Attendance	League position
2 February 2018	PDRM	H	1–1	Casagrande	??	5th
6 February 2018	Sabah	H	1–1	Casagrande 29'	??	7th
10 February 2018	Sarawak	A	3–2	Casagrande (3) 88', 90+2', 90+3	??	4th
23 February 2018	MISC-MIFA	H	1–1	Laly 89'	??	4th
10 March 2018	UiTM	A	1–1	Shahrom 90+5' (pen.)	??	5th
9 April 2018	UKM	H	2–1	Casagrande (2) 40', 76'	??	4th
13 April 2018	Penang	H	3–1	Casagrande (2) 47', 71', Laly 85'	??	4th
23 April 2018	Felda United	A	1–1	Casagrande 24',	??	2nd
27 April 2018	Johor Darul Ta'zim II	A	2–1	Laly 29', Aliff 79'	??	2nd
4 May 2018	Terengganu II	A	1–1	Ubaidullah 55'	??	2nd
21 May 2018	Terengganu II	H	3–1	Casagrande (3) 6', 73', 80	??	2nd
2 June 2018	Felda United	H	1–1	Casagrande 79'	??	2nd
8 June 2018	UKM	H	0–2		??	3rd
19 June 2018	UiTM	H	1–0	Endrick 25'	??	2nd
26 June 2018	MISC-MIFA	A	2–1	Alif 62', Azim Rahim 75'	??	2nd
3 July 2018	Penang	A	1–2	Casagrande 67'	??	2nd
13 July 2018	PDRM	A	3–1	Shahrom 10' (pen.), Casagrande (2) 55', 64'	??	2nd
18 July 2018	Johor Darul Ta'zim II	H	1–2	Casagrande 12'	??	2nd
27 July 2018	Sarawak	H	2–0	Casagrande (2) 56', 86	??	2nd

Pos	Team	Pld	W	D	L	GF	GA	GD	Pts	Promotion, qualification or relegation
1	Felda United (C, P)	20	12	7	1	44	24	+20	43	Promotion to 2019 Malaysia Super League
2	Felcra	20	9	7	4	30	24	+6	34	Withrew from Premier League and dissolved.
3	MIFA (P)	20	9	5	6	36	26	+10	32	Promotion to 2019 Malaysia Super League
4	Johor Darul Ta'zim II	20	8	6	6	28	23	+5	30	
5	PDRM	20	8	5	7	28	31	−3	29	

Updated to match(es) played on 30 December 2018. Source: FAM, FMLLP
Rules for classification: 1) Points; 2) Goal difference; 3) Number of goals scored.
(C) Champions; (P) Promoted

=== Malaysia FA Cup ===
Date	Round	Opponents	H / A	Result F–A	Scorers	Attendance
3 March 2018	Round 2	Felda United	H	2–5	Endrick 23', Casagrande 76'	??

=== Malaysia Cup ===
Date	Opponents	H / A	Result F–A	Scorers	Attendance	Group position
4 August 2018	Perak	A	0–0		??	3rd
12 August 2018	Kuala Lumpur	H	1–4	Nazrul 84'	??	4th
18 August 2018	Terengganu FC	A	2–2	Alif 60', Azim Rahim 90'	??	3rd
25 August 2018	Terengganu FC	H	1–4	Laly 3'	??	4th
2 September 2018	Kuala Lumpur	A	3–4	Azim Rahim 20', 44', Nazrul 69', Laly 84'	??	3rd
15 September 2018	Perak	H	2–1	Dzulfahmi 38', Azim Rahim 78'	??	3rd

Pos	Team	Pld	W	D	L	GF	GA	GD	Pts	Qualification	TER	PRK	FLC	KL
1	Terengganu	6	3	1	2	18	12	+6	10	Advance to knockout stage	—	1–2	2–2	2–3
2	Perak	6	3	1	2	9	7	+2	10	Advance to knockout stage	3–4	—	0–0	1–0
3	Felcra	6	2	2	2	10	14	−4	8		1–4	2–1	—	1–4
4	Kuala Lumpur	6	2	0	4	11	15	−4	6		1–5	0–2	3–4	—

Updated to match(es) played on 15 September 2018. Source: FAM FMLLP

== Squad statistics ==
As of 15 September 2018.

No.	Pos.	Name	League		FA Cup		League Cup		Total	
No.	Pos.	Name	Apps	Goals	Apps	Goals	Apps	Goals	Apps	Goals
1	GK	(Malaysia) Azrin Roslan	0	0	0	0	0	0	0	0
2	DF	(Malaysia) Syahmi Azhar	0	0	0	0	0	0	0	0
3	DF	(Brazil) Léo Carioca	19	0	1	0	0	0	20	0
5	DF	(Malaysia) Shahrom Kalam (c)	15(1)	2	1	0	6	0	22(1)	2
6	MF	(Indonesia) David Laly	19	3	1	0	6	2	26	5
7	DF	(Malaysia) Che Arif	0	0	0	0	6	0	6	0
8	MF	(Malaysia) Badrul Hisyam	1(1)	0	0	0	0	0	1(1)	0
9	FW	(Malaysia) Firdaus Azizul	0(5)	0	0(1)	0	0(3)	0	0(9)	0
10	FW	(Malaysia) Nazrul Kamaruzaman	2(11)	0	1	0	2(4)	2	5(15)	2
11	MF	(Malaysia) Dzulfahmi Abdul Hadi	5(7)	0	1	0	6	1	12(7)	1
12	FW	(Malaysia) Azim Rahim	0(13)	1	0	0	2(3)	4	2(16)	5
13	MF	(Malaysia) Asrol Ibrahim	0(3)	0	0	0	0(1)	0	0(4)	0
14	MF	(Brazil) Endrick	19	1	1	1	6	0	26	2
15	DF	(Malaysia) Zainuddin Abidin	1	0	0	0	5	0	6	0
16	DF	(Malaysia) Fazliata Taib	15	0	1	0	2(1)	0	18(1)	0
17	MF	(Malaysia) Fandi Othman	17	0	0	0	3	0	20	0
18	MF	(Malaysia) Arip Amiruddin	4(2)	0	0	0	0	0	4(2)	0
19	MF	(Brazil) Casagrande	19	20	1	1	4	0	24	21
21	MF	(Malaysia) Ammar Akhmall	0	0	0	0	0(1)	0	1	0
22	GK	(Malaysia) Fadzley Rahim	18	0	1	0	6	0	25	0
23	MF	(Malaysia) Farhan Mustafa	0	0	0	0	3	0	3	0
24	DF	(Malaysia) Nizam Abu Bakar	8(7)	0	0(1)	0	2	0	10(8)	0
25	MF	(Malaysia) Haziq Mu'iz	2	0	0	0	0(1)	0	2(1)	0
26	DF	(Malaysia) Nor Ubaidullah Rahman	15	1	1	0	2	0	18	1
27	FW	(Malaysia) Rashid Aya	13(3)	0	0(1)	0	0(1)	0	13(5)	0
28	MF	(Malaysia) Lukman Hakim	1	0	0	0	0	0	1	0
29	DF	(Malaysia) Alif Shamsudin	16	2	1	0	5	1	21	3
30	GK	(Malaysia) Yatim Abdullah	1	0	0	0	0	0	1	0
