= 2018 Malaysia Cup group stage =

The 2018 Malaysia Cup group stage featured 16 teams and will start on 4 August and concludes on 16 September 2018. A total of 16 teams will compete in the group stage to decide the 8 places in the knockout stage of the 2018 Malaysia Cup.

== Draw ==
The draw for the group stage was held on 30 July 2018, 15:30 MYT (UTC+8), at the Damansara Performing Arts Centre in Petaling Jaya, Selangor and has been broadcast live on iflix and Unifi TV. The 16 teams were drawn into 4 groups. In the group stage, each group was played on a home-and-away round-robin basis. The winners and runners-up of each group advanced to the knockout stage.

== Schedule ==
The schedule of each matchday were as follows.

Matchday	Dates
Matchday 1	4–5 August 2018
Matchday 2	10–12 August 2018
Matchday 3	17–19 August 2018
Matchday 4	25–26 & 28 August 2018
Matchday 5	31 August–2 September 2018
Matchday 6	15–17 September 2018

== Groups ==
=== Group A ===
Pos	Team	Pld	W	D	L	GF	GA	GD	Pts	Qualification	TER	PRK	FLC	KL
1	Terengganu	6	3	1	2	18	12	+6	10	Advance to knockout stage	—	1–2	2–2	2–3
2	Perak	6	3	1	2	9	7	+2	10	Advance to knockout stage	3–4	—	0–0	1–0
3	Felcra	6	2	2	2	10	14	−4	8		1–4	2–1	—	1–4
4	Kuala Lumpur	6	2	0	4	11	15	−4	6		1–5	0–2	3–4	—

Updated to match(es) played on 15 September 2018. Source: FAM FMLLP
4 August 2018
21:00 UTC+8

Perak	0–0	Felcra
	Report

Perak Stadium, Ipoh
Attendance: 2,777
Referee: Suresh Jayaraman
4 August 2018
21:00 UTC+8

Kuala Lumpur	1–5	Terengganu
Zaquan 85'	Report	Tchétché 25', 55', 72'; Tuck 44'; Zonjić 64'

Kuala Lumpur Stadium, Cheras
Attendance: 1,156
Referee: Razlan Joffri Ali

11 August 2018
21:00 UTC+8

Perak	3–4	Terengganu
Wander Luiz 86', 89'; Leandro 90+5' (pen.)	Report	Ashari 8'; Tuck 45+5' (pen.); Amirzafran 57'; Faiz 82'

Perak Stadium, Ipoh
Attendance: 3,248
Referee: Zulkarnain Zakaria
12 August 2018
21:00 UTC+8

Felcra	1–4	Kuala Lumpur
Nazrul 84'	Report	Guilherme 6' (pen.), 73', 85', 90'

Kuala Lumpur Stadium, Cheras
Attendance: 270
Referee: Nafeez Abd Wahab

18 August 2018
21:00 UTC+8

Terengganu	2–2	Felcra
Ashari 21', 46'	Report	Alif 60'; Azim 90'

Sultan Ismail Nasiruddin Shah Stadium, Kuala Terengganu
Attendance: 5,020
Referee: Nazmi Nasaruddin
19 August 2018
21:00 UTC+8

Kuala Lumpur	0–2	Perak
	Report	Noureddine 40'; Gilmar 63' (pen.)

Kuala Lumpur Stadium, Cheras
Attendance: 1,459
Referee: Razlan Joffri Ali

25 August 2018
21:00 UTC+8

Felcra	1–4	Terengganu
David 3'	Report	Tchétché 18'; Tuck 22', 62' (pen.), 79'

Kuala Lumpur Stadium, Cheras
Attendance: 598
Referee: Wan Mohamad Tarmizi
25 August 2018
21:00 UTC+8

Perak	1–0	Kuala Lumpur
Nasir 19'	Report

Perak Stadium, Ipoh
Attendance: 1,414
Referee: Fitri Maskon

2 September 2018
21:00 UTC+8

Kuala Lumpur	3–4	Felcra
Guilherme 60', 82' (pen.); Zainuddin 74' (o.g.)	Report	Azim 20', 44' (pen.); Nazrul 68'; David 83'

Kuala Lumpur Stadium, Cheras
Attendance: 157
Referee: Zamzaidi Katimin
2 September 2018
21:00 UTC+8

Terengganu	1–2	Perak
Ashari 66'	Report	Gilmar 21', 87'

Sultan Ismail Nasiruddin Shah Stadium, Kuala Terengganu
Attendance: 3,010
Referee: Nafeez Abd Wahab

15 September 2018
21:00 UTC+8

Felcra	2–1	Perak
Dzulfahmi 38'; Azim 78'	Report	Gilmar 75'

Kuala Lumpur Stadium, Cheras
Attendance: 580
Referee: S. Logeswaran
15 September 2018
21:00 UTC+8

Terengganu	2–3	Kuala Lumpur
Dong-hyun 34'; Shahrul 64'	Report	Guilherme 4', 87'; Josué 36'

Sultan Ismail Nasiruddin Shah Stadium, Kuala Terengganu
Attendance: 2,018
Referee: Suresh Jayaraman

=== Group B ===
Pos	Team	Pld	W	D	L	GF	GA	GD	Pts	Qualification	PKNS	FEL	MEL	PDRM
1	PKNS	6	4	1	1	18	9	+9	13	Advance to knockout stage	—	2–3	2–1	5–0
2	FELDA United	6	3	1	2	11	9	+2	10	Advance to knockout stage	0–1	—	0–0	2–0
3	Melaka United	6	2	3	1	18	9	+9	9		3–3	6–1	—	2–2
4	PDRM	6	0	1	5	5	25	−20	1		2–5	0–5	1–6	—

Updated to match(es) played on 15 September 2018. Source: FAM FMLLP
5 August 2018
21:00 UTC+8

PDRM	2–5	PKNS
Voinea 45'; Baqiuddin 79'	Report	Morales 27' (pen.); Ting 47'; Faris 63'; Ramazotti 74'; Safee 90+2'

Hang Jebat Stadium, Krubong
Attendance: 250
Referee: Suhaimi Mat Hassan
5 August 2018
21:00 UTC+8

FELDA United	0–0	Melaka United
	Report

Tun Abdul Razak Stadium, Jengka
Attendance: 1,258
Referee: Amirul Izwan Yaacob

11 August 2018
21:00 UTC+8

Melaka United	3–3	PKNS
Lee 7', 79'; Ifedayo 71'	Report	Morales 87'; Bruno 89'; Ramazotti 90+2'

Hang Jebat Stadium, Krubong
Attendance: 1,349
Referee: Zulkifli Ahmad
12 August 2018
21:00 UTC+8

PDRM	0–5	FELDA United
	Report	Thiago 54', 80', 90'; Gilberto 57' (pen.); Shukor 71'

Hang Jebat Stadium, Krubong
Attendance: 280
Referee: Tuan Mohd Yaasin

17 August 2018
21:00 UTC+8

Melaka United	2–2	PDRM
Ifedayo 86'; Zubovich 90+4'	Report	Woon-sub 49' (pen.); Nabil 79'

Hang Jebat Stadium, Krubong
Attendance: 487
Referee: Wan Mohamad Tarmizi
19 August 2018
21:00 UTC+8

PKNS	2–3	FELDA United
Ramazotti 16'; Faris 20'	Report	Ramsay 38' (pen.); Gilberto 68'; Afiq 81'

Shah Alam Stadium, Shah Alam
Attendance: 490
Referee: Fairuzi Mat Desa

26 August 2018
21:00 UTC+8

PDRM	1–6	Melaka United
Nabil 86'	Report	Ifedayo 12' (pen.); Syahrul 13', 45'; Shahdan 53'; Zubovich 57', 70'

Hang Jebat Stadium, Krubong
Attendance: 640
Referee: Nazmi Nasaruddin
28 August 2018
21:00 UTC+8

FELDA United	0–1	PKNS
	Report	Mahali 11'

Tun Abdul Razak Stadium, Jengka
Attendance: 635
Referee: Khirulazuan Kidam

1 September 2018
21:00 UTC+8

FELDA United	2–0	PDRM
Thiago 66'; Gilberto 90+3'	Report

Tun Abdul Razak Stadium, Jengka
Attendance: 594
Referee: Hamdan Awang
1 September 2018
21:00 UTC+8

PKNS	2–1	Melaka United
Morales 24'; Ramazotti 66'	Report	Syahrul 54'

Shah Alam Stadium, Shah Alam
Attendance: 462
Referee: Amirul Izwan Yaacob

15 September 2018
21:00 UTC+8

PKNS	5–0	PDRM
Jafri 3'; Bruno 13', 21', 76'; Faizat 53'	Report

Shah Alam Stadium, Shah Alam
Attendance: 313
Referee: Hamdan Awang
15 September 2018
21:00 UTC+8

Melaka United	6–1	FELDA United
Ifedayo 7', 43', 83'; Zubovich 24'; Chanturu 73', 78'	Report	Zahril 55'

Hang Jebat Stadium, Krubong
Attendance: 239
Referee: Nafeez Abd Wahab

=== Group C ===
Pos	Team	Pld	W	D	L	GF	GA	GD	Pts	Qualification	JDT	KEL	MIFA	KED
1	Johor Darul Ta'zim	6	3	0	3	11	7	+4	9	Advance to knockout stage	—	1–0	1–2	5–1
2	Kelantan	6	2	2	2	3	3	0	8	Advance to knockout stage	1–0	—	0–0	2–0
3	MISC-MIFA	6	2	2	2	8	9	−1	8		0–3	2–0	—	2–2
4	Kedah	6	2	2	2	9	12	−3	8		3–1	0–0	3–2	—

Updated to match(es) played on 16 September 2018. Source: FAM FMLLP
5 August 2018
21:00 UTC+8

Johor Darul Ta'zim	1–2	MISC-MIFA
Márquez 68' (pen.)	Report	Sherman 19'; Beom-geun 80'

Tan Sri Dato' Haji Hassan Yunos Stadium, Larkin
Attendance: 4,650
Referee: Wan Mohamad Tarmizi
5 August 2018
21:00 UTC+8

Kedah	0–0	Kelantan
	Report

Darul Aman Stadium, Alor Setar
Attendance: 4,063
Referee: Zulkarnain Zakaria

10 August 2018
21:00 UTC+8

Johor Darul Ta'zim	5–1	Kedah
Márquez 13'; Insa 46'; Hazwan 72'; Cabrera 82'; Kunanlan 90+1'	Report	Sandro 35'

Tan Sri Dato' Haji Hassan Yunos Stadium, Larkin
Attendance: 8,690
Referee: Razlan Joffri Ali
10 August 2018
21:00 UTC+8

MISC-MIFA	2–0	Kelantan
Sherman 25' (pen.); Satrunan 75'	Report

MBPJ Stadium, Petaling Jaya
Attendance: 1,513
Referee: Zohri Tajuddin

17 August 2018
21:00 UTC+8

Kelantan	1–0	Johor Darul Ta'zim
Cristiano 45+3' (pen.)	Report

Sultan Muhammad IV Stadium, Kota Bharu
Attendance: 2,807
Referee: Suhaimi Mat Hassan
18 August 2018
21:00 UTC+8

Kedah	3–2	MISC-MIFA
Krasniqi 44' (pen.), 60'; Sandro 66'	Report	Sherman 28'; Syazwan 48' (o.g.)

Darul Aman Stadium, Alor Setar
Attendance: 2,500
Referee: Amirul Izwan Yaacob

25 August 2018
21:00 UTC+8

Johor Darul Ta'zim	1–0	Kelantan
Márquez 65'	Report

Tan Sri Dato' Haji Hassan Yunos Stadium, Larkin
Attendance: 7,780
Referee: Zulkarnain Zakaria
26 August 2018
21:00 UTC+8

MISC-MIFA	2–2	Kedah
Seydi 51'; Barathkumar 81'	Report	Sandro 31'; Halim 55'

Petaling Jaya Stadium, Petaling Jaya
Attendance: 1,200
Referee: Suresh Jayaraman

31 August 2018
21:00 UTC+8

Kedah	3–1	Johor Darul Ta'zim
Sandro 6'; Akhyar 47'; Krasniqi 90+4'	Report	Márquez 36'

Darul Aman Stadium, Alor Setar
Attendance: 8,500
Referee: Zohri Tajuddin
31 August 2018
21:00 UTC+8

Kelantan	0–0	MISC-MIFA
	Report

Sultan Muhammad IV Stadium, Kota Bharu
Attendance: 2,847
Referee: Razlan Joffri Ali

16 September 2018
21:00 UTC+8

Kelantan	2–0	Kedah
Danial 52'; Akif 90+2'	Report

Sultan Muhammad IV Stadium, Kota Bharu
Attendance: 3,351
Referee: Razlan Joffri Ali
16 September 2018
21:00 UTC+8

MISC-MIFA	0–3	Johor Darul Ta'zim
	Report	Cabrera 63' (pen.); Safawi 73', 83' (pen.)

Petaling Jaya Stadium, Petaling Jaya
Attendance: 5,214
Referee: Zulkarnain Zakaria

=== Group D ===
Pos	Team	Pld	W	D	L	GF	GA	GD	Pts	Qualification	SAB	PAH	SEL	PKNP
1	Sabah	6	4	1	1	8	7	+1	13	Advance to knockout stage	—	0–4	2–1	1–0
2	Pahang	6	3	2	1	9	4	+5	11	Advance to knockout stage	1–1	—	1–3	0–0
3	Selangor	6	2	0	4	9	11	−2	6		1–2	0–2	—	0–3
4	PKNP	6	1	1	4	4	8	−4	4		0–2	0–1	1–4	—

Updated to match(es) played on 17 September 2018. Source: FAM FMLLP
4 August 2018
21:00 UTC+8

Pahang	1–1	Sabah
Austin 45+1'	Report	Faisal 46' (o.g.)

Darul Makmur Stadium, Kuantan
Attendance: 2,812
Referee: Nagor Amir Noor Mohamed
4 August 2018
21:00 UTC+8

Selangor	0–3	PKNP
	Report	Hafiz 23'; Fandi 32'; Krjauklis 62'

Shah Alam Stadium, Shah Alam
Attendance: 1,160
Referee: Zamzaidi Katimin

11 August 2018
20:15 UTC+8

Sabah	1–0	PKNP
Rahman 90+2'	Report

Likas Stadium, Kota Kinabalu
Attendance: 2,850
Referee: Khirulazuan Kidam
11 August 2018
21:00 UTC+8

Selangor	0–2	Pahang
	Report	Muslim 30'; Norshahrul 54'

Shah Alam Stadium, Shah Alam
Attendance: 2,848
Referee: Nazmi Nasaruddin

18 August 2018
20:15 UTC+8

Sabah	2–1	Selangor
Rahman 83'; Ricco 90+2'	Report	Sean 79'

Likas Stadium, Kota Kinabalu
Attendance: 6,200
Referee: Zulkarnain Zakaria
18 August 2018
21:00 UTC+8

PKNP	0–1	Pahang
	Report	Davies 83'

Penang State Stadium, Penang
Attendance: 739
Referee: Zamzaidi Katimin

25 August 2018
21:00 UTC+8

Pahang	0–0	PKNP
	Report

Darul Makmur Stadium, Kuantan
Attendance: 3,010
Referee: Ku Alauddin Ku Muhammad
28 August 2018
21:00 UTC+8

Selangor	1–2	Sabah
Rufino 90+4' (pen.)	Report	Ramos 52'; Paunović 86'

Shah Alam Stadium, Shah Alam
Attendance: 951
Referee: Nagor Amir Noor Mohamed

1 September 2018
21:00 UTC+8

Pahang	1–3	Selangor
Safuwan 31'	Report	Rufino 7'; Pacheco 47'; Sarkunan 90+5'

Darul Makmur Stadium, Kuantan
Attendance: 3,484
Referee: Fitri Maskon
2 September 2018
21:00 UTC+8

PKNP	0–2	Sabah
	Report	Paunović 31'; Ramos 81'

Penang State Stadium, Penang
Attendance: 709
Referee: Nagor Amir Noor Mohamed

16 September 2018
21:00 UTC+8

PKNP	1–4	Selangor
Fandi 30'	Report	Dimas 37'; Rufino 40' (pen.); Amri 43'; Joseph 90+3'

Penang State Stadium, Penang
Attendance: 428
Referee: Hasrol Amir
17 September 2018
20:15 UTC+8

Sabah	0–4	Pahang
	Report	Norshahrul 10'; Zuhair 38'; Cruz 78'; Issey 90+2'

Likas Stadium, Kota Kinabalu
Attendance: 6,600
Referee: Zohri Tajuddin
