= 2018 Malaysia FA Cup =

Piala FA

Tournament details
- Country: Malaysia
- Teams: 40

Final positions
- Champions: Pahang (3rd title)
- Runners-up: Selangor

Tournament statistics
- Matches played: 45
- Goals scored: 154 (3.42 per match)
- Top goal scorer(s): (Spain) Rufino Segovia (9 goals)

The 2018 Malaysia FA Cup (also known as Shopee Malaysia FA Cup for sponsorship reasons) was the 29th season of the Malaysia FA Cup, a knockout competition for Malaysia's state football association and clubs.

40 teams entered the competition.

== Qualified teams ==
The following teams are qualified for the competition. Reserve teams are excluded.

Liga Super the 12 teams of the 2018 season	Liga Premier the 10 non-reserve teams of the 2018 season	Piala FAM the 9 teams of the 2018 season	Liga Sosial the 9 teams of the social leagues around Malaysia
Johor Darul Ta'zim; Kedah; Kelantan; Kuala Lumpur; Melaka United; Negeri Sembilan; Pahang; Perak; PKNP; PKNS; Selangor; Terengganu	Felcra; Felda United; Kuantan; MIFA; PDRM; Penang; Sabah; Sarawak; UiTM; UKM	ATM; Hanelang; Kuching; MOF FC; Perlis; PJ Rangers; Selangor United; Shahzan Muda; Terengganu City	Axis-O2; CNA; Invictus; Jerantut; MD Jempol; PIB; Real Chukai; Southern; SRCC Kuala Kangsar

== Round and draw dates ==
Round	Draw date	1st leg	2nd leg
First Round	5 February 2018, 21:00 UTC+8	13 February	
Second Round	5 February 2018, 21:00 UTC+8	2–4 March	
Third Round	6 March 2018, 15:00 UTC+8	16–17 March	
Quarter-finals	20 March 2018, 16:00 UTC+8	6–7 April	20–21 April
Semi-final	20 March 2018, 16:00 UTC+8	23 June	30 June–1 July
Final	20 March 2018, 16:00 UTC+8	7 July	

== Matches ==
Key: (1) = Super League; (2) = Premier League; (3) = FAM League; (4) = Liga Sosial

== First Round ==
13 February 2018	Selangor United (3)	1–2	Southern (4)	Kajang, Selangor
16:15 UTC+8	Yusaini Hafiz 40'		Sharul Afif 58', 68'	Stadium: Prison Stadium; Attendance: 253; Referee: Ghafar Mohamad Zabri

13 February 2018	Terengganu City (3)	2–1	Jerantut (4)	Kuala Terengganu, Terengganu
21:00 UTC+8	Rahizi Rasib 67', 86'		Mohd Afriyashah 65'	Stadium: Sultan Ismail Nasiruddin Shah Stadium; Referee: Tuan Mohd Yasin

13 February 2018	Axis-O2 (4)	4–1	SRCC Kuala Kangsar (4)	Subang Jaya, Selangor
21:00 UTC+8	Adli Zulgafi 5'; Aidil Shahril 12'; Haedar Halim 53'; Farhan Khairul 90+1'		Meor Khorul 85'	Stadium: MPS Mini Stadium; Attendance: 500; Referee: Mohd Ridhwan Abd Rahman

13 February 2018	PJ Rangers (3)	6–1	MD Jempol (4)	Petaling Jaya, Selangor
21:00 UTC+8	Azriddin Rosli 12'; Shamie Iszuan 18', 48'; Arif Anwar 58'; Raslam Khan 79', 86'		Hafiza Rahman 22'	Stadium: Petaling Jaya Stadium; Referee: Mohd Faizzudin Ismail

13 February 2018	Kuching (3)	2–0	Real Chukai (4)	Kuching, Sarawak
15:30 UTC+8	Ahmad Shakri 31'; Shafitri Salim 89'			Stadium: Sarawak State Stadium; Referee: Mohammed Hanif Abdul Rahman

13 February 2018	Shahzan Muda (3)	3–0	PIB (4)	Temerloh, Pahang
21:00 UTC+8	Faizal Rani 55', 90'; Firdaus Anuar 85'			Stadium: Temerloh Mini Stadium; Referee: Jubik Andangon

13 February 2018	MOF (3)	6–0	CNA (4)	Bangi, Selangor
21:00 UTC+8	Fakrullah Rosli 26', 41', 45', 79', 89'; Farid Azmi 78'			Stadium: INSPENS Stadium; Attendance: 252; Referee: Muhammad Nasruddin

13 February 2018	Invictus (4)	0–3	Hanelang (3)	Shah Alam, Selangor
16:15 UTC+8			Faizal Aziz 2'; Zairo Anuar 43'; Saifulnizam Abdullah 56'	Stadium: Matshushita Stadium; Referee: S. Logeswaran

== Second Round ==
2 March 2018	Kelantan (1)	2–0	Terengganu City (3)	Kota Bahru, Kelantan
21:00 UTC+8	Cássio 24'; Shafiq Sharuddin 74'	Report		Stadium: Sultan Muhammad IV Stadium; Referee: Muhammad Almi Abdullah

2 March 2018	PKNS (1)	4–1	Hanelang (3)	Shah Alam, Selangor
21:00 UTC+8	Jafri Firdaus 8'; Romel Morales 37'; Rafael Ramazotti 57'; Nurridzuan Abu Hassan 70'	Report	Munawar Sakuth Ali 11'	Stadium: Shah Alam Stadium; Attendance: 33; Referee: Fitri Maskon

2 March 2018	Kedah (1)	1–0 (a.e.t.)	Negeri Sembilan (1)	Alor Setar, Kedah
21:00 UTC+8	Baddrol Bakhtiar 120'	Report		Stadium: Darul Aman Stadium; Referee: Wan Muhammad Tarmizi

2 March 2018	UiTM (2)	3–0	Perlis (3)	Shah Alam, Selangor
21:00 UTC+8	Dao Bakary 11', 60'; Sadam Hashim 88'	Report		Stadium: UiTM Stadium

3 March 2018	Shahzan Muda (3)	1–2	PKNP (1)	Temerloh, Pahang
16:15 UTC+8	Rifaie Awang Long 75'	Report	Yeon Gi-sung 37', 60'	Stadium: Temerloh Mini Stadium; Referee: Ahmad Tajuddin Mohd Yusoff

3 March 2018	PJ Rangers (3)	0–4	Terengganu (1)	Petaling Jaya, Selangor
16:15 UTC+8		Report	Lee Tuck 36'; Igor Zonjić 59'; Shahrul Aizad 75'; Kipré Tchétché 84' (pen.)	Stadium: Petaling Jaya Stadium

3 March 2018	Sabah (2)	1–2 (a.e.t.)	Johor Darul Ta'zim (1)	Kota Kinabalu, Sabah
20:15 UTC+8	Lee Kil-Hoon 25'	Report	Luciano Figueroa 52'; Gonzalo Cabrera 94'	Stadium: Likas Stadium

3 March 2018	Kuala Lumpur (1)	4–0	Kuching (3)	Cheras, Kuala Lumpur
21:00 UTC+8	Guilherme de Paula 21', 65', 90'; Paulo Josué 49'	Report		Stadium: KLFA Stadium; Referee: Suhaizi Shukri

3 March 2018	Felcra (2)	2–5	Felda United (2)	Shah Alam, Selangor
21:00 UTC+8	Endrick Santos 23'; Casagrande 75'	Report	Thiago Augusto 45+1' (pen.), 64'; Shukor Adan 72'; Hadin Azman 84'; Gilberto Fortunato 90' (pen.)	Stadium: Shah Alam Stadium; Referee: Ismail Asib Md Amin

3 March 2018	Perak (1)	3–1	Sarawak (2)	Lumut, Perak
21:00 UTC+8	Wander Luiz 13'; Gilmar 39', 84'	Report	Mateo Roskam 7'	Stadium: TLDM Stadium; Referee: Suresh Jayaraman

4 March 2018	MOF (3)	0–3	Selangor (1)	Cheras, Kuala Lumpur
21:00 UTC+8		Report	Amri Yahyah 70'; Rufino Segovia 82' (pen.); Syahmi Safari 90+3'	Stadium: KLFA Stadium; Referee: Mat Zan Abd Wahab

4 March 2018	Kuantan (2)	7–0	Axis-O2 (4)	Shah Alam, Selangor
21:00 UTC+8	Žarko Korać 4', 24', 59'; Abdul Manaf Mamat 42'; Andrezinho 92'; Murilo Almeida 74'; Muhamad Azmi 79'	Report		Stadium: UiTM Stadium; Referee: Muhammad Rahmat Jantan

4 March 2018	Pahang (1)	2–1	ATM (3)	Kuantan, Pahang
21:00 UTC+8	Norshahrul Idlan 35'; Safuwan Baharudin 74'	Report	Mohd Zaironi 66'	Stadium: Darul Makmur Stadium; Referee: Abdul Rahman Wahab

4 March 2018	MIFA (2)	1–1 (a.e.t.) (2–4 p)	UKM (2)	Petaling Jaya, Selangor
21:00 UTC+8	Kpah Sherman 45'	Report	Atuheire Kipson 90+5'	Stadium: Petaling Jaya Stadium; Referee: Razlan Joffri Ali
	Penalties
	Kpah Sherman (penalty missed) ? (penalty scored); Bae Beom-geun (penalty missed) ? (penalty scored)		(penalty scored) ? (penalty missed) ? (penalty scored) ? (penalty scored) ? (penalty scored) Faiz Hanif

4 March 2018	Melaka United (1)	7–0	Southern (4)	Krubong, Melaka
21:00 UTC+8	Yahor Zubovich 13' (pen.), 26'; Gopinathan Ramachandra 24'; Fauzi Roslan 34'; Farderin Kadir 44'; Azmi Muslim 52'; Nurshamil Abd Ghani 75'	Report		Stadium: Hang Jebat Stadium; Referee: Zulkifli Ahmad

4 March 2018	PDRM (2)	1–3	Penang (2)	Shah Alam, Selangor
21:00 UTC+8	Shim Un-seob 90+1'	Report	Ken Ilsø 7', 34' (pen.); Kang Seung-jo 8'	Stadium: Shah Alam Stadium; Referee: Ghafar Muhammad Zabri

== Third Round ==
16 March 2018	PKNP (1)	3–0	Kuantan (2)	Batu Kawan, Penang
16:45 UTC+8	Shahrel Fikri 32', 90+2'; Yeon Gi-sung 72'	Report		Stadium: Penang State Stadium; Referee: Fitri Maskon

16 March 2018	Felda United (2)	2–1	UKM (2)	Jengka, Pahang
21:00 UTC+8	Gilberto Fortunato 14'; Thiago Augusto 39'	Report	Atuheire Kipson 6'	Stadium: Tun Abdul Razak Stadium; Referee: Suhaizi Shukri

16 March 2018	Terengganu (1)	1–3	Selangor (1)	Kuala Terengganu, Terengganu
21:00 UTC+8	Shahrul Aizad 24'	Report	Rufino Segovia 27', 70' (pen.); Evan Dimas 61'	Stadium: Sultan Ismail Nasiruddin Shah Stadium; Referee: Nagor Amir Noor Mohamed

17 March 2018	Pahang (1)	1–0	Kedah (1)	Kuantan, Pahang
21:00 UTC+8	Mohamadou Sumareh 45+1'	Report		Stadium: Darul Makmur Stadium; Referee: Suhaizi Shukri

17 March 2018	Melaka United (1)	1–1 (a.e.t.) (1–3 p)	Kuala Lumpur (1)	Krubong, Malacca
21:00 UTC+8	Yahor Zubovich 4'	Report	Guilherme de Paula 31'	Stadium: Hang Jebat Stadium; Referee: Suhaimi Mat Hassan
	Penalties
	Khair Jones (penalty missed); Steven Thicot (penalty scored); G. Puaneswaran (penalty missed); Tiago Gomes (penalty missed)		(penalty scored) Guilherme de Paula; (penalty scored) Indra Putra Mahayuddin; (penalty missed) Zaiful Abdul Hakim; (penalty scored) Paulo Josué

17 March 2018	UiTM (2)	2–3	Johor Darul Ta'zim (1)	Shah Alam, Selangor
21:00 UTC+8	Lucas Pugh 45+4'; Faiz Bandong 89'		Safawi Rasid 11', 41', 72'	Stadium: UiTM Stadium

17 March 2018	Penang (2)	1–3	Perak (1)	Batu Kawan, Penang
21:00 UTC+8	Ugo Ukah 89' (pen.)	Report	Wander Luiz 17', 79'; Gilmar 73' (pen.)	Stadium: Penang State Stadium

17 March 2018	PKNS (1)	4–1	Kelantan (1)	Shah Alam, Selangor
21:00 UTC+8	Romel Morales 16'; Mahali Jasuli 42'; Safee Sali 61'; Rafael Ramazotti 68'		Mohammed Ghaddar 90+2' (pen.)	Stadium: Shah Alam Stadium

=== Bracket ===
Quarterfinals
Kuala Lumpur	0	3	3 (7)
Selangor	3	0	3 (8)
PKNS	2	2	4
Perak	1	2	3
Pahang	0	3	3
Johor Darul Ta'zim	0	0	0
PKNP (a)	0	2	2
Felda United	1	1	2

Semifinals
Selangor	4	1	5
PKNS	0	1	1
Pahang	1	2	3
PKNP	1	1	2

Final
Selangor	0
Pahang	2

== Quarter-final ==
Team 1	Agg.	Team 2	1st leg	2nd leg
Kuala Lumpur (1)	3–3 (7–8 p)	Selangor (1)	0–3	3–0 (a.e.t.)
PKNS (1)	4–3	Perak (1)	2–1	2–2
Pahang (1)	3–0	Johor Darul Ta'zim (1)	0–0	3–0
PKNP (1)	2–2 (a)	Felda United (2)	0–1	2–1

=== First leg ===
7 April 2018	Kuala Lumpur	0–3	Selangor	Cheras, Kuala Lumpur
21:00 UTC+8		Report	Willian Pacheco 20'; Rufino Segovia 24', 90+1'	Stadium: KLFA Stadium; Referee: Suhaizi Shukri

7 April 2018	PKNS	2–1	Perak	Shah Alam, Selangor
21:00 UTC+8	Faris Ramli 25'; Safee Sali 89'	Report	Wander Luiz 90+7' (pen.)	Stadium: Shah Alam Stadium; Referee: Fitri Maskon

6 April 2018	Pahang	0–0	Johor Darul Ta'zim	Kuantan, Pahang
21:00 UTC+8		Report		Stadium: Darul Makmur Stadium; Referee: Zulkarnain Bin Zakaria

7 April 2018	PKNP	0–1	Felda United	Batu Kawan, Penang
16:15 UTC+8		Report	Thiago Augusto 50'	Stadium: Penang State Stadium; Referee: Wan Mohamad Tarmizi

=== Second leg ===
21 April 2018	Selangor	0–3 (a.e.t.) (8–7 p)	Kuala Lumpur	Cheras, Kuala Lumpur
21:00 UTC+8		Report	Zaquan Adha 14'; Paulo Josué 45'; Syazwan Andik 54'	Stadium: KLFA Stadium; Referee: Nafeez Abd. Wahab
	Penalties
	Rufino Segovia (penalty scored); Evan Dimas (penalty scored); Sean Selvaraj (penalty scored); Azamuddin Akil (penalty scored); Ilham Armaiyn (penalty missed); Arunasalam Namathevan (penalty scored); K. Kannan (penalty scored); K. Sarkunan (penalty scored); Amirul Ashraf (penalty scored)		(penalty scored) Paulo Josué; (penalty missed) Indra Putra Mahayuddin; (penalty scored) Zhafri Yahya; (penalty scored) Irfan Zakaria; (penalty scored) Hafiz Johar; (penalty scored) Syazwan Andik; (penalty scored) Bobur Akbarov; (penalty scored) Zaquan Adha; (penalty missed) Firdaus Faudzi

21 April 2018	Perak	2–2	PKNS	Ipoh, Perak
21:00 UTC+8	Nasir Basharudin 73', 82'	Report	Rodney Akwensivie 55'; K. Gurusamy 64' (pen.)	Stadium: Perak Stadium

20 April 2018	Johor Darul Ta'zim	0–3	Pahang	Larkin, Johor
21:00 UTC+8			Patrick Cruz 9', 59', 77'	Stadium: Tan Sri Dato' Haji Hassan Yunos Stadium

20 April 2018	Felda United	1–2	PKNP	Jengka, Pahang
21:00 UTC+8	Wan Zack Haikal 26'	Report	Shahrel Fikri 15', 43'	Stadium: Tun Abdul Razak Stadium; Referee: Suhaimi Mat Hassan

== Semi-final ==
Team 1	Agg.	Team 2	1st leg	2nd leg
Selangor (1)	5–1	PKNS (1)	4–0	1–1
Pahang (1)	3–2	PKNP (1)	1–1	2–1

=== First leg ===
23 June 2018	Selangor (1)	4–0	PKNS (1)	Cheras, Kuala Lumpur
21:00 UTC+8	Rufino Segovia 39', 40', 56'; Azmizi Azmi 64' (o.g.)	Report		Stadium: KLFA Stadium

23 June 2018	Pahang (1)	1–1	PKNP (1)	Kuantan, Pahang
21:00 UTC+8	Wan Zaharulnizam 25'	Report	Sukri Hamid 13'	Stadium: Darul Makmur Stadium

=== Second leg ===
30 June 2018	PKNS (1)	1–1	Selangor (1)	Shah Alam, Selangor
21:00 UTC+8	Alif Haikal 90+1'	Report	Rufino Segovia 71'	Stadium: Shah Alam Stadium; Referee: Muhammad Nazmi Nasaruddin

1 July 2018	PKNP (1)	1–2	Pahang (1)	Ipoh, Perak
21:00 UTC+8	Anzité 82'	Report	Amutu 32'; Norshahrul 76'	Stadium: Perak Stadium; Referee: Suhaizi Shukri

== Final ==
The final was played on 7 July 2018 at Bukit Jalil National Stadium.

7 July 2018
21:00 UTC+8

Selangor	0–2	Pahang
	Report	Azam Azih 23'; Patrick Cruz 62' (pen.)

Bukit Jalil National Stadium, Bukit Jalil, Kuala Lumpur
Attendance: 43,512
Referee: Zukarnain Zakaria

== Top goalscorers ==
As of 7 July 2018

Rank	Player	Club	Goals
1	(Spain) Rufino Segovia	Selangor	9
2	(Malaysia) Fakrullah Rosli	MOF	5
3	(Brazil) Guilherme de Paula	Kuala Lumpur	4
3	(Brazil) Thiago Augusto	Felda United	4
3	(Malaysia) Shahrel Fikri	PKNP	4
3	(Brazil) Patrick Cruz	Pahang	4
3	(Brazil) Wander Luiz	Perak	4
6	(Brazil) Gilmar	Perak	3
6	(Malaysia) Safawi Rasid	Johor Darul Ta'zim	3
6	(Belarus) Yahor Zubovich	Melaka United	3
6	(South Korea) Yeon Gi-sung	PKNP	3
6	(Montenegro) Žarko Korać	Kuantan	3

== See also ==
- 2018 Malaysia Super League
- 2018 Malaysia Premier League
- 2018 Malaysia FAM Cup
- 2018 Malaysia Cup
- 2018 Piala Presiden
- 2018 Piala Belia
- List of Malaysian football transfers 2018
