= 2018 Malaysia Cup knockout stage =

The 2018 Malaysia Cup knockout stage began on 21 September 2018 and concluded on 27 October 2018 with the final at Shah Alam Stadium in Shah Alam, to decide the champions of the 2018 Malaysia Cup. A total of 8 teams competed in the knockout phase.

== Qualified teams ==
The knockout phase involves the eight teams which qualified as winners and runners-up of each of the four groups in the group stage.

Group	Winners (Seeded in quarter final draw)	Runners-up (Unseeded in quarter final draw)
A	Terengganu	Perak
B	PKNS	FELDA United
C	Johor Darul Ta'zim	Kelantan
D	Sabah	Pahang

== Format ==
The knockout phase involved the eight teams which qualified as winners and runners-up of each of the eight groups in the group stage.

Each tie in the knockout phase, apart from the final, was played over two legs, with each team playing one leg at home. The team that scored more goals on aggregate over the two legs advanced to the next round. If the aggregate score was level, the away goals rule was applied, i.e. the team that scored more goals away from home over the two legs advanced. If away goals were also equal, then thirty minutes of extra time was played. The away goals rule was again applied after extra time, i.e. if there were goals scored during extra time and the aggregate score was still level, the visiting team advanced by virtue of more away goals scored. If no goals were scored during extra time, the tie was decided by penalty shoot-out. In the final, which was played as a single match, if scores were level at the end of normal time, extra time was played, followed by penalty shoot-out if scores remained tied.

The mechanism of the draws for each round was as follows:

- In the draw for the quarter-final, the four group winners were seeded, and the four group runners-up were unseeded. The seeded teams were drawn against the unseeded teams, with the seeded teams hosting the second leg. Teams from the same group or the same association could not be drawn against each other.
- In the draws for the quarter-finals onwards, there were no seedings, and teams from the same group or the same association could be drawn against each other.

== Schedule ==
The schedule was as follows (all draws were held at the Damansara Performing Arts Centre in Petaling Jaya).

Round	Draw date and time	First leg	Second leg
Quarter-finals	30 July 2018, 15:30 UTC+8	21–23 & 25 September 2018	28–30 September 2018
Semi-finals	30 July 2018, 15:30 UTC+8	6–7 October 2018	20–21 October 2017
Final	30 July 2018, 15:30 UTC+8	27 October 2018 at Shah Alam Stadium, Shah Alam	

== Bracket ==
Quarter-finals
B2	FELDA United	1	3	4
A1	Terengganu	2	4	6
D2	Pahang	1	0	1
C1	Johor Darul Ta'zim	1	2	3
A2	Perak	0	2	2
B1	PKNS	0	0	0
C2	Kelantan	2	0	2
D1	Sabah (a)	1	1	2

Semi-finals
Terengganu	1	2	3
Johor Darul Ta'zim	0	2	2
Perak	5	2	7
Sabah	0	2	2

Final
Terengganu	3 (1)
Perak	3 (4)

== Quarter-finals ==
The first legs were played on 21, 22, 23 & 25 September, and the second legs were played on 28, 29 and 30 September 2018.

Team 1	Agg.	Team 2	1st leg	2nd leg
FELDA United	4–6	Terengganu	1–2	3–4
Kelantan	2–2 (a)	Sabah	2–1	0–1
Pahang	1–3	Johor Darul Ta'zim	1–1	0–2
Perak	2–0	PKNS	0–0	2–0

=== Matches ===
First leg

21 September 2018
21:00 UTC+8

FELDA United	1–2	Terengganu
Gilberto 56'	Report	Nasrullah 9'; Tuck 81' (pen.)

Tun Abdul Razak Stadium, Jengka
Attendance: 3,470
Referee: Amirul Izwan Yaacob

Second leg

28 September 2018
21:00 UTC+8

Terengganu	4–3	FELDA United
Tuck 57'; Adib 69'; Malik 83'; Tchétché 86'	Report	Thiago 12'; Syamim 49'; Gilberto 79'

Sultan Ismail Nasiruddin Shah Stadium, Kuala Terengganu
Attendance: 10,661
Referee: Suresh Jayaraman

Terengganu won 6–4 on aggregate.

First leg

22 September 2018
21:00 UTC+8

Kelantan	2–1	Sabah
Duyshobekov 29'; Akif 45+2' (pen.)	Report	Hamran 43'

Sultan Muhammad IV Stadium, Kota Bharu
Attendance: 13,987
Referee: Zamzaidi Katimin

Second leg

29 September 2018
20:15 UTC+8

Sabah	1–0	Kelantan
Paunović 31' (pen.)	Report

Likas Stadium, Kota Kinabalu
Attendance: 20,220
Referee: Fitri Maskon

2–2 on aggregate. Sabah won on away goals.

First leg

23 September 2018
21:00 UTC+8

Pahang	1–1	Johor Darul Ta'zim
Safuwan 90+2'	Report	Cabrera 46'

Darul Makmur Stadium, Kuantan
Attendance: 13,446
Referee: Razlan Joffri Ali

Second leg

29 September 2018
21:00 UTC+8

Johor Darul Ta'zim	2–0	Pahang
Safawi 1', 73'	Report

Tan Sri Dato' Haji Hassan Yunos Stadium, Larkin
Attendance: 18,850
Referee: Zohri Tajuddin

Johor Darul Ta'zim won 3–1 on aggregate.

First leg

25 September 2018
21:00 UTC+8

Perak	0–0	PKNS
	Report

Perak Stadium, Ipoh
Attendance: 4,729
Referee: Suhaizi Shukri

Second leg

30 September 2018
21:00UTC+8

PKNS	0–2	Perak
	Report	Wander Luiz 23', 57'

Shah Alam Stadium, Shah Alam
Attendance: 2,235
Referee: Nagor Amir Noor Mohamed

Perak won 2–0 on aggregate.

== Semi-finals ==
The first legs were played on 6 and 7 October, and the second legs were played on 20 and 21 October 2018.

Team 1	Agg.	Team 2	1st leg	2nd leg
Terengganu	3–2	Johor Darul Ta'zim	1–0	2–2
Perak	7–2	Sabah	5–0	2–2

=== Matches ===
First leg

6 October 2018
21:00 UTC+8

Terengganu	1–0	Johor Darul Ta'zim
Malik 78'	Report

Sultan Ismail Nasiruddin Shah Stadium, Kuala Terengganu
Attendance: 10,800
Referee: Zulkarnain Zakaria

Second leg

20 October 2018
21:00 UTC+8

Johor Darul Ta'zim	2–2	Terengganu
Márquez 41' (pen.); Cabrera 62'	Report	Tchétché 69', 90+2'

Tan Sri Dato' Haji Hassan Yunos Stadium, Larkin
Attendance: 21,150
Referee: Nazmi Nasaruddin

Terengganu won 3–2 on aggregate.

First leg

7 October 2018
21:00 UTC+8

Perak	5–0	Sabah
Hakim 17'; Wander Luiz 42'; Gilmar 73'; Firdaus 76'; Leandro 90+4' (pen.)	Report

Perak Stadium, Ipoh
Attendance: 18,462
Referee: Zamzaidi Katimin

Second leg

21 October 2018
20:15 UTC+8

Sabah	2–2	Perak
Sabri 35'; Rawilson 85'	Report	Gilmar 74' (pen.), 81'

Likas Stadium, Kota Kinabalu
Attendance: 4,150
Referee: Suhaizi Shukri

Perak won 7–2 on aggregate.

== Final ==
The final was played on 27 October 2018 at the Shah Alam Stadium in Shah Alam.

27 October 2018
21:00 UTC+8

Terengganu	3–3 (a.e.t.)	Perak
Tchétché 1', 42'; Faiz 96'	Report	Firdaus 46'; Brendan 90+1'; Zonjić 120+1' (o.g.)
Penalties
Zonjić (penalty missed); Thierry (penalty missed); Nasrullah (penalty scored)	1–4	(penalty scored) Wander Luiz; (penalty scored) Amirul; (penalty scored) Shahrul; (penalty scored) Leandro

Shah Alam Stadium, Shah Alam
Attendance: 78,783
Referee: Suresh Jayaraman
