= 2018 Malaysia Cup final =

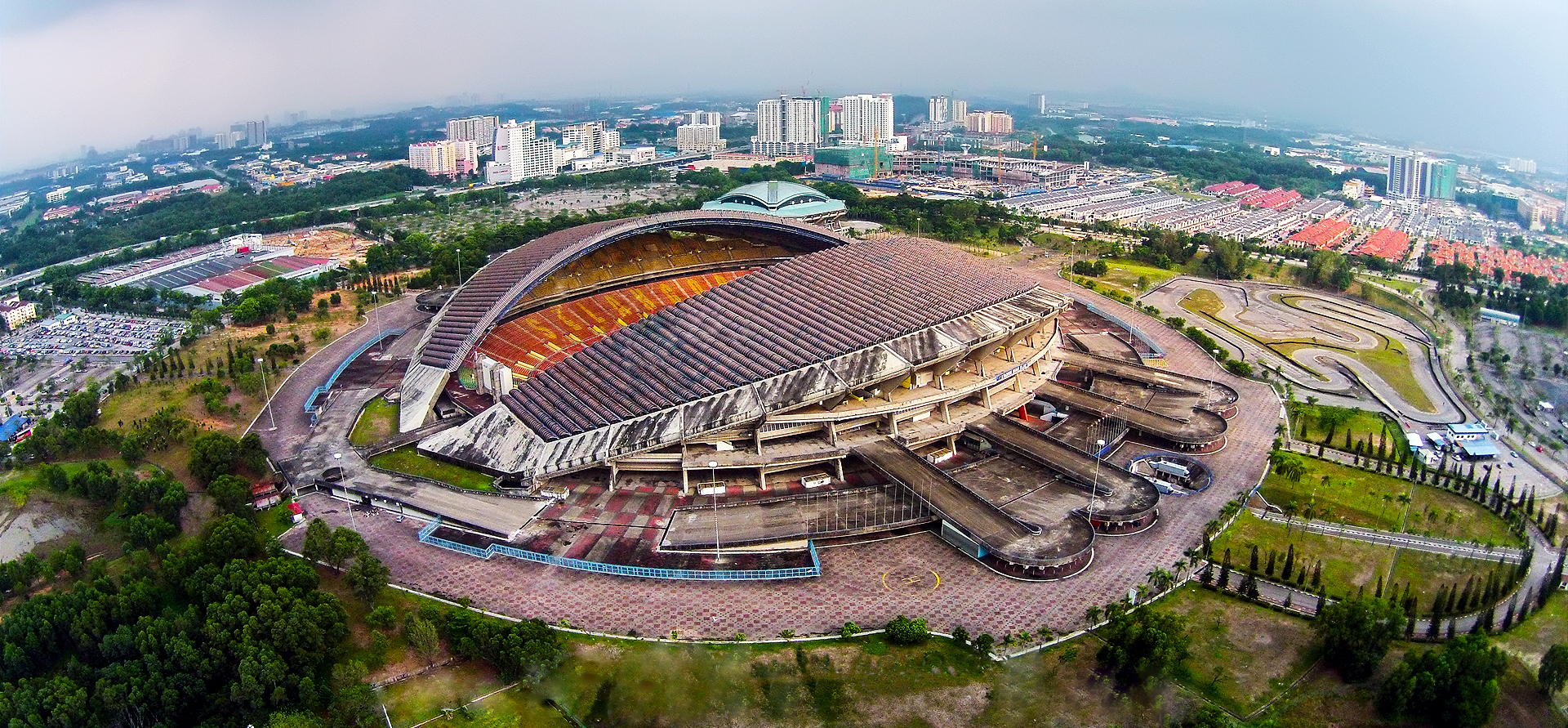
- The match took place at Shah Alam Stadium.
- Event: 2018 Malaysia Cup
Terengganu	Perak
3	3
- After extra time Perak won 4–1 on penalties
- Date: 27 October 2018
- Venue: Shah Alam Stadium, Shah Alam
- Man of the Match: Brendan Gan (Perak)
- Referee: Suresh Jayaraman
- Attendance: 78,783
- Weather: Partly cloudy 26 °C (79 °F)

The 2018 Malaysia Cup final was a football match which were played on 27 October 2018, to determine the champion of the 2018 Malaysia Cup. It was the final of the 92nd edition of the Malaysia Cup, competition organised by the Football Association of Malaysia.

It was played at the Shah Alam Stadium, in Shah Alam, Selangor, between Terengganu and Perak. Perak won 4–1 on a penalty shoot-out after a 3–3 draw at the end of extra time, securing the 8th title in the competition.

== Route to the final ==
Note: In all results below, the score of the finalist is given first.

Terengganu				Round	Perak			
Opponent	Result			Group stage	Opponent	Result		
Kuala Lumpur	5–1 (A)			Matchday 1	Felcra	0–0 (H)		
Perak	4–3 (A)			Matchday 2	Terengganu	3–4 (H)		
Felcra	2–2 (H)			Matchday 3	Kuala Lumpur	2–0 (A)		
Felcra	4–1 (A)			Matchday 4	Kuala Lumpur	1–0 (H)		
Perak	1–2 (H)			Matchday 5	Terengganu	2–1 (A)		
Kuala Lumpur	2–3 (H)			Matchday 6	Felcra	1–2 (A)		
Group A winners: Pos / Team / Pld / Pts; 1 / Terengganu / 6 / 10; 2 / Perak / 6 / 10; 3 / Felcra / 6 / 8; 4 / Kuala Lumpur / 6 / 6; Updated to match(es) played on 15 September 2018. Source: FAM FMLLP				Final standings	Group A runners-up: Pos / Team / Pld / Pts; 1 / Terengganu / 6 / 10; 2 / Perak / 6 / 10; 3 / Felcra / 6 / 8; 4 / Kuala Lumpur / 6 / 6; Updated to match(es) played on 15 September 2018. Source: FAM FMLLP			
Opponent	Agg.	1st leg	2nd leg	Knockout phase	Opponent	Agg.	1st leg	2nd leg
FELDA United	6–4	2–1 (A)	4–3 (H)	Quarter-finals	PKNS	2–0	0–0 (H)	2–0 (A)
Johor Darul Ta'zim	3–2	1–0 (H)	2–2 (A)	Semi-finals	Sabah	7–2	5–0 (H)	2–2 (A)

== Match ==
=== Details ===
Team List and Official

27 October 2018
21:00 UTC+8

Terengganu	3–3 (a.e.t.)	Perak
Tchétché 1', 42'; Faiz 96'	Report	Firdaus 46'; Brendan 90+1'; Zonjić 120+1' (o.g.)
Penalties
Zonjić (penalty missed); Thierry (penalty missed); Nasrullah (penalty scored)	1–4	(penalty scored) Wander Luiz; (penalty scored) Amirul; (penalty scored) Shahrul; (penalty scored) Leandro

Shah Alam Stadium, Shah Alam
Attendance: 78,783
Referee: Suresh Jayaraman

Terengganu	Perak

GK	29	(Malaysia) Suffian Rahman
RB	22	(Malaysia) Adib Aizuddin
CB	24	(Serbia) Igor Zonjić	(yellow card) 59'
LB	4	(Malaysia) Kamal Azizi
RM	16	(Malaysia) Partiban Janasekaran		(substituted off) 105+1'
DM	8	(Cambodia) Thierry Bin
DM	13	(Malaysia) Latiff Suhaimi
LM	15	(Malaysia) Faiz Nasir
AM	7	(England) Lee Tuck	(yellow card) 37' (yellow-red card) 66'
CF	10	(Malaysia) Malik Ariff		(substituted off) 62'
CF	23	(Ivory Coast) Kipré Tchétché (c)		(substituted off) 78'
Substitutes:
GK	27	(Malaysia) Wan Azraie
DF	3	(Malaysia) Fitri Omar
DF	17	(Malaysia) Nasrullah Haniff		(substituted in) 104'
DF	26	(Malaysia) Hasnizaidi Jamian
MF	12	(Malaysia) Shahrul Aizad		(substituted in) 62'
MF	18	(Malaysia) Fauzi Kadar
FW	30	(Malaysia) Ashari Samsudin		(substituted in) 78'
Head Coach:
(Malaysia) Irfan Bakti

GK	22	(Malaysia) Hafizul Hakim
RB	23	(Malaysia) Amirul Azhan
CB	15	(Malaysia) Idris Ahmad
CB	3	(Malaysia) Shahrul Saad (c)
LB	21	(Malaysia) Nazirul Naim
RM	14	(Malaysia) Firdaus Saiyadi		(substituted off) 77'
CM	8	(Brazil) Leandro	(yellow card) 120+1'
CM	11	(Malaysia) Brendan Gan		(substituted off) 93'
LM	19	(Malaysia) Hakim Hassan		(substituted off) 46'
CF	10	(Brazil) Wander Luiz	(yellow card) 35'
CF	9	(Brazil) Gilmar	(red card) 59'
Substitutions:
GK	18	(Malaysia) Khairul Amri
DF	5	(Lebanon) Jad Noureddine
DF	25	(Malaysia) Rafiuddin Roddin
MF	4	(Malaysia) Nasir Basharudin		(substituted in) 93'
MF	7	(Malaysia) Khairil Anuar		(substituted in) 77'
MF	12	(Malaysia) Kenny Pallraj		(substituted in) 46'
FW	30	(Malaysia) Nizad Ayub
Head Coach:
(Australia) Mehmet Duraković

Officials

- Assistant referees:'
  - Azman Ismail
  - Mohd Fazli Ishak
- Fourth Official:'
  - Azmi Khalid
- Additional assistant referees:'
  - Tuan Mohd Yaasin
  - Almi Abdullah

Match Rules

- 90 minutes.
- 30 minutes of extra time if necessary.
- Penalty shoot-out if scores still level.
- Seven named substitutes.
- Maximum of three substitutions.

=== Statistics ===
Overall
Statistic	Perak	Terengganu
Goals scored	3	3
Total shots	11	15
Shots on target	9	7
Saves	0	0
Ball possession	44%	56%
Corner kicks	12	15
Fouls committed	16	13
Offsides	2	3
Yellow cards	3	2
Red cards	1	1

== See also ==
- 2018 Malaysia FA Cup Final
