= Curran Singh Ferns =

Australian former soccer player

Personal information
- Date of birth: 6 July 1993 (age 33)
- Place of birth: Darwin, Australia
- Height: 1.80 m (5 ft 11 in)
- Positions: Defensive midfielder; centre-back

Youth career
- 2000–2008: Monash City
- 2009: Victorian Institute of Sport
- 2009–2010: Melbourne Victory Youth
- 2010: Football Federation Victoria

Senior career*
Years	Team	Apps	(Gls)
2015	Brisbane City	11	(0)
2016	Johor Darul Ta'zim II	1	(0)
2016–2017	Negeri Sembilan	20	(1)
2017–2018	Felda United	18	(0)
2018–2019	Sukhothai	14	(0)
2019	Port Melbourne	12	(0)
2020	Melaka United	7	(0)
- * Club domestic league appearances and goals as of 7 October 2020

Curran Lawrance Singh Ferns (born 6 July 1993) is an Australian former professional soccer player who last played for Malaysia Super League club Kuala Lumpur City. Ferns was a central midfielder but also could play as a centre-back.

Ferns was a highly composed technical player with advanced passing skills, but was also known for his competitive and defensive attributes on the field.

== Club careers ==
=== Australia ===
Ferns grew up in the eastern suburbs of Melbourne. At the age of 15, Ferns was selected for an elite sports scholarship with the Victorian Institute of Sport Men's Football Program, and shortly after represented Melbourne Victory FC Youth which competes in the National Youth League. At Melbourne Victory FC Youth and the Football Federation Victoria National Training Centre he was coached and mentored by Mehmet Durakovic.

Ferns began playing senior professional football in Australia in the National Premier Leagues competition with Brisbane City. and later played for half a season at Port Melbourne.

=== Malaysia ===
During 2015, Ferns left Australia to trial with Johor Darul Ta'zim F.C. based in Johor Bahru, Johor, Malaysia and was signed for Johor Darul Ta'zim II F.C. for the beginning of the 2016 season. After spending 6 months with Johor Darul Ta'zim II F.C. he signed with Negeri Sembilan FA making his debut against Felda United F.C. in the Malaysia Cup tournament.

After a successful 12-month period with Negeri Sembilan FA, Ferns received an offer to join Felda United F.C. at the beginning of the 2017 mid-season transfer window. He left the Negeri Sembilan FA team while they were in first position of the Malaysia Premier League, having gone undefeated during their first 13 successive league games, and after reaching the semi-final stage of the Malaysia FA Cup.

Ferns made his debut for Felda United F.C. in the Malaysia Super League with a 2-1 win against Pahang FA in July 2017. Under the guidance of head coach B. Sathianathan, Ferns made a successful contribution, helping the team reach 3rd place in the Malaysia Super League and semi-final of the Malaysia Cup. Unfortunately, in the off-season of 2017 the club was notified it was being relegated to the Malaysia Premier League for the 2018 season after failing the Football Association of Malaysia club licence financial audit. Despite this setback, Ferns and the majority of the squad stayed at the club to help Felda United F.C win the title and secure promotion back to the Malaysia Super League for 2019.

In late 2019, FOX Sports Asia reported Ferns had joined Melaka United for the 2020 season.

=== Thailand ===
Ferns confirmed a move to Thailand's Thai League 1 to join Sukhothai FC to FOX Sports Asia in an article in June 2018. Ferns left Felda United F.C. with a commanding eleven point lead at the top of the Malaysia Premier League with only six games remaining for the 2018 season. Ferns played his first game for Sukhothai FC in the 2018 Thai League Cup on 13 June 2018 against Port FC. Ferns subsequently re-signed a new contract with Sukhothai FC to represent the club for the 2019 season.

== Honours ==
Felda United

- Malaysia Premier League Championship: 2018

== Career statistics ==
=== Club ===
As of 7 October 2020.

Appearances and goals by club, season and competition
Club	Season	League			FA Cup		League Cup		Continental		Total	
Club	Season	Division	Apps	Goals	Apps	Goals	Apps	Goals	Apps	Goals	Apps	Goals
Negeri Sembilan	2016	Malaysia Premier League	11	0	0	0	0	0	–		11	0
Negeri Sembilan	2017	Malaysia Premier League	9	1	1 (Note: Appearances in Malaysia FA Cup)	0	0	0	–		11	1
Total			20	1	1	0	0	0	–		22	1
Felda United	2017	Malaysia Super League	8	0	0	0	9 (Note: Appearances in Malaysia Cup)	0	–		17	0
Felda United	2018	Malaysia Premier League	10	0	4	0	0	0	–		14	0
Total			18	0	4	0	9	0	–		31	0
Sukhothai	2018	Thai League 1	10	0	1 (Note: Appearances in Thai FA Cup)	0	1 (Note: Appearances in Thai League Cup)	2			28	0
Sukhothai	2019	Thai League 1	2	0	0	0	0	0			2	0
Total			12	0	1	0	1	0	–		14	0
Melaka United	2020	Malaysia Super League	7	0	-	-	-	-	-	-	7	0
Career Total			57	1	6	0	10	0	–	–	74	1

== Personal life ==
Ferns is a naturalised Malaysia citizen. His mother was born in Johor Bahru and grew up in Penang. His father was born in Australia and grew up in Liverpool, UK. He is also the grand-nephew of the late Malaysian lawyer and politician Karpal Singh. Ferns has publicly expressed his desire to represent the Harimau Malaya.
