= 2018 Malaysia Cup =

Piala Malaysia 2018

Tournament details
- Country: Malaysia
- Dates: 4 August – 27 October 2018
- Teams: 16

Final positions
- Champions: Perak (8th title)
- Runners-up: Terengganu

Tournament statistics
- Matches played: 61
- Goals scored: 201 (3.3 per match)
- Top goal scorer(s): Kipré Tchétché (9 goals)

Awards
- Best player: Brendan Gan

The 2018 Malaysia Cup (Malay: Piala Malaysia 2018) was the 92nd edition of Malaysia Cup tournament organised by Football Association of Malaysia (FAM). Known as the unifi Malaysia Cup due to the start of a sponsorship deal with unifi.

The 2018 Malaysia Cup began on August with a preliminary round. A total of 16 teams took part in the competition. The teams were divided into four groups, each containing four teams. The group leaders and runners-up teams in the groups after six matches qualified to the quarterfinals.

Johor Darul Ta'zim were the defending champions, but they were eliminated by Terengganu in the semi-finals.

== Format ==
In the competition, the top eleven teams from the 2018 Malaysia Super League were joined by the top five teams from the 2018 Malaysia Premier League. The teams were drawn into four groups of four teams.

== Round and draw dates ==
The draw for the 2018 Malaysia Cup was held on 30 July 2018 at Damansara Performing Arts Centre on live telecast iflix with the participating team coaches and captains in attendance.

Phase	Round	Draw date	First leg	Second leg
Group stage	Matchday 1	30 July 2018; 15:30 UTC+8	4–5 August 2018	
Group stage	Matchday 2	30 July 2018; 15:30 UTC+8	10–12 August 2018	
Group stage	Matchday 3	30 July 2018; 15:30 UTC+8	17–19 August 2018	
Group stage	Matchday 4	30 July 2018; 15:30 UTC+8	25–26 & 28 August 2018	
Group stage	Matchday 5	30 July 2018; 15:30 UTC+8	31 August – 2 September 2018	
Group stage	Matchday 6	30 July 2018; 15:30 UTC+8	15–17 September 2018	
Knockout stage	Quarter-finals	30 July 2018; 15:30 UTC+8	21–23 & 25 September 2018	28–30 September 2018
Knockout stage	Semi-finals	30 July 2018; 15:30 UTC+8	6–7 October 2018	20–21 October 2018
Knockout stage	Final	30 July 2018; 15:30 UTC+8	27 October 2018	

== Seeding ==
Pot 1	Pot 2	Pot 3	Pot 4
1. Johor Darul Ta'zim; 2. Perak; 3. PKNS; 4. Pahang	5. Terengganu; 6. Kedah; 7. Melaka United; 8. Selangor	9. PKNP; 10. Kuala Lumpur; 11. Kelantan; 12. FELDA United	13. Felcra; 14. MISC-MIFA; 15. PDRM; 16. Sabah

== Group stage ==
The draw for the group stage was held on 30 July 2018, 15:30 MYT (UTC+8), at the Damansara Performing Arts Centre in Petaling Jaya, Selangor and has been broadcast live on iflix and Unifi TV. The 16 teams were drawn into 4 groups. In the group stage, each group was played on a home-and-away round-robin basis. The winners and runners-up of each group advanced to the knockout stage.

=== Group A ===
Pos	Team	Pld	W	D	L	GF	GA	GD	Pts	Qualification	TER	PRK	FLC	KL
1	Terengganu	6	3	1	2	18	12	+6	10	Advance to knockout stage	—	1–2	2–2	2–3
2	Perak	6	3	1	2	9	7	+2	10	Advance to knockout stage	3–4	—	0–0	1–0
3	Felcra	6	2	2	2	10	14	−4	8		1–4	2–1	—	1–4
4	Kuala Lumpur	6	2	0	4	11	15	−4	6		1–5	0–2	3–4	—

Updated to match(es) played on 15 September 2018. Source: FAM FMLLP

=== Group B ===
Pos	Team	Pld	W	D	L	GF	GA	GD	Pts	Qualification	PKNS	FEL	MEL	PDRM
1	PKNS	6	4	1	1	18	9	+9	13	Advance to knockout stage	—	2–3	2–1	5–0
2	FELDA United	6	3	1	2	11	9	+2	10	Advance to knockout stage	0–1	—	0–0	2–0
3	Melaka United	6	2	3	1	18	9	+9	9		3–3	6–1	—	2–2
4	PDRM	6	0	1	5	5	25	−20	1		2–5	0–5	1–6	—

Updated to match(es) played on 15 September 2018. Source: FAM FMLLP

=== Group C ===
Pos	Team	Pld	W	D	L	GF	GA	GD	Pts	Qualification	JDT	KEL	MIFA	KED
1	Johor Darul Ta'zim	6	3	0	3	11	7	+4	9	Advance to knockout stage	—	1–0	1–2	5–1
2	Kelantan	6	2	2	2	3	3	0	8	Advance to knockout stage	1–0	—	0–0	2–0
3	MISC-MIFA	6	2	2	2	8	9	−1	8		0–3	2–0	—	2–2
4	Kedah	6	2	2	2	9	12	−3	8		3–1	0–0	3–2	—

Updated to match(es) played on 16 September 2018. Source: FAM FMLLP

=== Group D ===
Pos	Team	Pld	W	D	L	GF	GA	GD	Pts	Qualification	SAB	PAH	SEL	PKNP
1	Sabah	6	4	1	1	8	7	+1	13	Advance to knockout stage	—	0–4	2–1	1–0
2	Pahang	6	3	2	1	9	4	+5	11	Advance to knockout stage	1–1	—	1–3	0–0
3	Selangor	6	2	0	4	9	11	−2	6		1–2	0–2	—	0–3
4	PKNP	6	1	1	4	4	8	−4	4		0–2	0–1	1–4	—

Updated to match(es) played on 17 September 2018. Source: FAM FMLLP

== Knockout stage ==
In the knockout stage, teams played against each other over two legs on a home-and-away basis, except for the one-match final. The mechanism of the draws for each round was as follows:

- In the draw for the quarter final, the fourth group winners were seeded, and the fourth group runners-up were unseeded. The seeded teams were drawn against the unseeded teams, with the seeded teams hosting the second leg. Teams from the same group or the same association could not be drawn against each other.
- In the draws for the quarter-finals onwards, there were no seedings, and teams from the same group or the same association could be drawn against each other.

=== Bracket ===
Quarter-finals
B2	FELDA United	1	3	4
A1	Terengganu	2	4	6
D2	Pahang	1	0	1
C1	Johor Darul Ta'zim	1	2	3
A2	Perak	0	2	2
B1	PKNS	0	0	0
C2	Kelantan	2	0	2
D1	Sabah (a)	1	1	2

Semi-finals
Terengganu	1	2	3
Johor Darul Ta'zim	0	2	2
Perak	5	2	7
Sabah	0	2	2

Final
Terengganu	3 (1)
Perak	3 (4)

=== Quarter-finals ===
The first legs were played on 21, 22, 23 & 25 September, and the second legs were played on 28, 29 and 30 September 2018.

Team 1	Agg.	Team 2	1st leg	2nd leg
FELDA United	4–6	Terengganu	1–2	3–4
Kelantan	2–2 (a)	Sabah	2–1	0–1
Pahang	1–3	Johor Darul Ta'zim	1–1	0–2
Perak	2–0	PKNS	0–0	2–0

=== Semi-finals ===
The first legs were played on 6 and 7 October, and the second legs were played on 20 and 21 October 2018.

Team 1	Agg.	Team 2	1st leg	2nd leg
Terengganu	3–2	Johor Darul Ta'zim	1–0	2–2
Perak	7–2	Sabah	5–0	2–2

=== Final ===
The final was played on 27 October 2018 at the Shah Alam Stadium in Shah Alam.

27 October 2018
21:00 UTC+8

Terengganu	3–3 (a.e.t.)	Perak
Tchétché 1', 42'; Faiz 96'	Report	Firdaus 46'; Brendan 90+1'; Zonjić 120+1' (o.g.)
Penalties
Zonjić (penalty missed); Thierry (penalty missed); Nasrullah (penalty scored)	1–4	(penalty scored) Wander Luiz; (penalty scored) Amirul; (penalty scored) Shahrul; (penalty scored) Leandro

Shah Alam Stadium, Shah Alam
Attendance: 78,783
Referee: Suresh Jayaraman

== Statistics ==
=== Goalscorers ===
As of 28 October 2018

Players sorted first by goals scored, then by first name.

Rank	Player	Club	Goals
1	(Ivory Coast) Kipré Tchétché	Terengganu	9
2	(Brazil) Guilherme de Paula	Kuala Lumpur	8
3	(Brazil) Gilmar	Perak	7
3	(England) Lee Tuck	Terengganu	7
5	(Nigeria) Ifedayo Olusegun	Melaka United	6
6	(Brazil) Gilberto Fortunato	FELDA United	5
6	(Argentina) Fernando Márquez	Johor Darul Ta'zim	5
6	(Brazil) Wander Luiz	Perak	5

=== Hat-tricks ===
Player	For	Against	Result	Date
(Ivory Coast) Kipré Tchétché	Terengganu	Kuala Lumpur	1–5	4 August 2018
(Brazil) Thiago Fernandes	Felda United	PDRM	0–5	12 August 2018
(Brazil) Guilherme de Paula^{4}	Kuala Lumpur	Felcra	1–4	12 August 2018
(England) Lee Tuck	Terengganu	Felcra	1–4	25 August 2018
(Brazil) Bruno Matos	PKNS	PDRM	5–0	15 September 2018
(Nigeria) Ifedayo Olusegun	Melaka United	Felda United	6–1	15 September 2018

^{4} Player scored four goals

== See also ==
- 2018 Malaysia FA Cup
- 2018 Malaysia Challenge Cup
