= Jerantut FA =

Malaysian football club

Jerantut
- Full name: Football Association of Jerantut
- Nicknames: The Mat Kilau Spirits; The Kampung Boys
- Founded: 2013; 13 years ago
- Ground: FA Jerantut Ground; Tun Abdul Razak Stadium (selected matches)
- Chairman: Tengku Nor Asmaliza Tengku Lah
- League: Liga Bolasepak Rakyat

Football Association of Jerantut was a football club based in Jerantut, Pahang. The club last competed in the fourth division Liga Bolasepak Rakyat.

== History ==
Jerantut FA participated in the FA Cup since 2019, as they progressed to the Liga Bolasepak Rakyat in 2018. Jerantut entered the FA Cup in the first round, beating MP Besut FA. They later faced Johor Bahru FA in the second round and won 3–0 at Tun Abdul Razak Stadium, Jengka. In the 3rd round they were playing against Perak. Despite strict financial status, Jerantut still wanted to play as home team, despite being offered to play at Stadium Perak. Jerantut lost 1–2, despite leading goal from Mohd Firdaus. 2 goals from Wander Luiz took Perak to victory.

== Honours ==
=== Cup ===
- Sultan Pahang Cup
  - Champions: 2015, 2017
  - Runners-up: 2018
