= Jad Noureddine =

Lebanese footballer (born 1992)

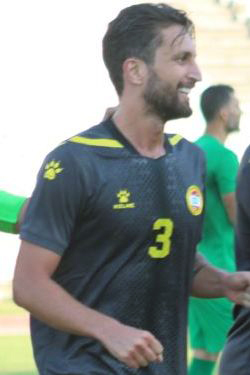
- Noureddine with Ahed in 2020

Personal information
- Full name: Jad Ahmad Noureddine
- Date of birth: 27 February 1992 (age 34)
- Place of birth: Khirbet Selm, Lebanon
- Height: 1.86 m (6 ft 1 in)
- Position: Centre-back

Team information
- Current team: Racing Beirut
- Number: 5

Youth career
- 2006: Shabab Arabi
- 2006–2009: Dinamo București

Senior career*
Years	Team	Apps	(Gls)
2009–2011	Nejmeh		
2011–2016	Shabab Sahel	88	(2)
2016	Pusamania Borneo	28	(5)
2017	Arema FC	13	(1)
2017–2018	Safa	21	(2)
2018	Perak	8	(0)
2018–2020	Safa	10	(0)
2020–2022	Ahed	3	(0)
2020–2021	→ Al-Ahli (loan)	10	(0)
2021	→ Perak (loan)	4	(0)
2022	→ Akhaa Ahli Aley (loan)	9	(0)
2023–	Racing Beirut	13	(0)

International career
2007	Lebanon U17	5	(2)
2012	Lebanon U22	5	(0)
2011	Lebanon U23	1	(0)
2016–2017	Lebanon	3	(0)
- * Club domestic league appearances and goals as of 26 April 2024

Jad Ahmad Noureddine (Arabic: جاد أحمد نور الدين; born 27 February 1992) is a Lebanese professional footballer who plays as a centre-back for Lebanese Second Division club Racing Beirut.

Noureddine began his senior career in 2009 at Lebanese Premier League side Nejmeh, before moving to Shabab Sahel in 2011. Noureddine moved to Indonesia, to Pusamania Borneo and Arema FC, in 2016 and 2017 respectively. He returned to Lebanon, joining Safa in 2017, before moving to Malaysia at Perak in 2018. In 2018 Noureddine returned to Safa, before joining AFC Cup title-holders Ahed in 2020. He moved on loan to Al-Ahli in Bahrain and Perak in Malaysia. After a one-year stop from football, Noureddine joined Racing Beirut in 2023.

Noureddine represented Lebanon at both youth and senior level; he made his senior international debut in 2016, and played three games until 2017.

== Club career ==
=== Indonesia ===
Jad played for Indonesian sides Pusamania Borneo and Arema FC in 2016 and 2017. Because of an ACL injury that he suffered in 2016, while playing for Pusamania Borneo, Jad Noureddine went back to his home country, Lebanon, to take medical treatment—there were no specialists in Indonesia that could treat him.

=== Safa and Perak ===
In 2017, Noureddine returned to Lebanon, signing for Safa. After playing 21 games in the 2017–18 season, scoring twice, on 4 June 2018 Noureddine joined Malaysia Super League club Perak, during the mid-season transfer window. He played eight of the nine remaining games of the 2018 season.

On 21 December 2018, Noureddine returned to Safa on a two-and-a-half-year deal. During the second half of the 2018–19 season, Noureddine played 10 league games.

=== Ahed ===
On 9 July 2020, Noureddine joined AFC Cup champions Ahed, on a free transfer, on a five-year contract.

==== Loans to Al-Ahli, Perak and Akhaa ====
Noureddine moved to Bahraini Premier League side Al-Ahli on 29 November 2020, on a five-month loan. He made his debut on 10 December, in a 1–1 draw to Malkiya. Noureddine helped his side beat Hidd in the Bahraini King's Cup semi-final to qualify to the final against Riffa, which he lost.

On 31 May 2021, Ahed loaned out Noureddine to Perak in the Malaysia Super League on a six-month deal. On 23 February 2022, Noureddine was loaned to Akhaa Ahli Aley until the end of the season.

After returning to Ahed from his loan spell, Noureddine terminated his contract by mutual consent.

=== Racing Beirut ===
Following a one-year stop from football, Noureddine joined newly promoted Lebanese Premier League side Racing Beirut.

== International career ==
Noureddine has represented Lebanon internationally at youth level since age 14, and was captain of the under-23s. He was first called up for the senior team in September 2016 for a friendly against Afghanistan as an unused substitute. He made his debut on 10 November, in a friendly against Palestine.

== Honours ==
Arema FC

- Indonesia President's Cup: 2017

Perak FA

- Malaysia Cup: 2018

Al-Ahli

- Bahraini King's Cup runner-up: 2020–21

Ahed

- Lebanese Elite Cup: 2022
