= Stuart Wark =

Scottish footballer

Personal information
- Full name: Stuart James Wilson Wark
- Date of birth: 31 August 1989 (age 37)
- Place of birth: Scotland
- Height: 1.81 m (5 ft 11 in)
- Position: Centre back

Senior career*
Years	Team	Apps	(Gls)
2012–2015	Lugar Boswell Thistle	60	(36)
2015	Albany Creek Excelsior	8	(1)
2015–2016	Johor Darul Ta'zim II	1	(0)
2016	Sabah	10	(0)
2017–2018	Felda United	31	(1)
2019	Penang	8	(0)
2019	PDRM	9	(0)
2020	Terengganu	0	(0)
2021–2022	Sarawak United	28	(1)
2023	Kasetsart	13	(0)
- * Club domestic league appearances and goals as of 30 April 2023

Stuart James Wilson Wark (born 31 August 1989) is a Scottish professional footballer who last played as a centre back for Thai League 2 club Kasetsart.

== Club career ==
=== Lugar Boswell Thistle ===
In July 2012, Stuart signed a three-year contract with a Scottish football club Lugar Boswell Thistle. From 2012 until 2015, he made 60 appearances with the club and scored 36 goals for Lugar Boswell Thistle.

=== Albany Creek Excelsior ===
On 1 June 2015, Stuart joined a Brisbane Premier League side Albany Creek Excelsior from Lugar Boswell Thistle. He only joined the team for a short 2 months. He made 8 appearances for Albany Creek Excelsior and scored 1 goal.

=== Johor Darul Ta'zim II ===
In August 2015, Stuart signed for JDT reserve team that playing in Malaysia Premier League, JDT II ahead for 2016 Malaysia Premier League season.

=== Sabah ===
In July 2016, Stuart joined a Malaysia Premier League side Sabah for a one-year term from JDT II. Stuart made his unofficial team debut with Sabah in a friendly match against Terengganu.

=== Felda United ===
In January 2017, Stuart signed a two-year contract with Felda United in Malaysia Premier League. Under the management of B. Sathianathan, he made 31 appearances with the team and scored 1 goal. He became the champion of 2018 Malaysia Premier League after Felda United secured the top spot in the table for the 2018 season and secured a promotion spot in 2019 Malaysia Super League.

=== Penang ===
In January 2019, Stuart signed for a fellow Malaysia Premier League side Penang. Under the management of Ahmad Yusof, He made 8 appearances with Penang in the 2019 Malaysia Premier League. He didn't score any goal for the 2019 season.

=== PDRM ===
In June 2019, Stuart Wark signed for PDRM in the Malaysia Premier League.

=== Terengganu ===
On 6 January 2020, Stuart Wark signed a one-year contract for Terengganu in the Malaysia Super League.

=== Sarawak United ===
In January 2021, Stuart signed for Malaysia Premier League side Sarawak United.

On 14 November 2021, Stuart made his debut with Malaysia Super League side Sarawak United FC in a 1-2 lose against Terengganu F.C. in the Malaysia Cup quarter final. Stuart made his team debut after got selected in the team first eleven.

=== Kasetsart FC ===
In January 2023, Stuart Wark signed for Thai League 2 side Kasetsart F.C. On 28 January 2023, Stuart Wark made his Thai League 2 debut by coming off the bench in Kasetsart F.C. 2–1 win over Trat F.C. He got subbed in 78th minutes replacing Patakorn Hanratana.

== Career statistics ==
=== Club ===
As of the 10 June 2024.

Appearances and goals by club, season and competition
Club	Season	League			Cup		League Cup		Continental (Note: Includes cup competitions such as the AFC Champions Cup, and AFC Cup)		Total	
Club	Season	Division	Apps	Goals	Apps	Goals	Apps	Goals	Apps	Goals	Apps	Goals
Lugar Boswell Thistle F.C.	2012-2015	West of Scotland Football League	60	36	-	-	-	-	-	-	60	36
Lugar Boswell Thistle F.C.	Total		60	36	-	-	-	-	-	-	60	36
Albany Creek Excelsior	2015	Brisbane Premier League	8	1	0	0	0	0	0	0	8	1
Albany Creek Excelsior	Total		8	1	0	0	0	0	0	0	8	1
Johor Darul Ta'zim II	2015	Malaysia Premier League	1	0	0	0	0	0	0	0	1	0
Johor Darul Ta'zim II	2016	Malaysia Premier League	0	0	0	0	0	0	0	2	0	0
Johor Darul Ta'zim II	Total		1	0	0	0	0	0	0	0	1	0
Sabah	2016	Malaysia Premier League	3	0	3	1	0	0	0	0	6	1
Sabah	Total		3	0	3	1	0	0	0	0	6	1
FELDA United	2017	Malaysia Super League	1	0	2	0	0	0	0	0	3	
FELDA United	2018	Malaysia Super League	0	0	0	0	0	0	0	0	0	
FELDA United	Total		1	0	2	0	0	0	0	0	3	0
Penang	2019	Malaysia Premier League	3	0	3	1	0	0	0	0	6	1
Penang	Total		3	0	3	1	0	0	0	0	6	1
PDRM	2019	Malaysia Premier League	4	0	1	0	0	0	0	0	5	0
PDRM	Total		4	0	1	0	0	0	0	0	5	0
Terengganu	2020	Malaysia Super League	4	1	0	0	0	0	0	0	4	1
Terengganu	Total		0	0	0	0	0	0	0	0	0	0
Sarawak United	2021-2022	Malaysia Premier League	0	0	1	0	0	0	0	0	1	0
Sarawak United	Total		0	0	1	0	0	0	0	0	1	0
Kasetsart	2023	Thai League 2	4	1	0	0	0	0	0	0	4	1
Kasetsart	Total		0	0	0	0	0	0	0	0	0	0
Career total			39	5	11	2	3	0	0	0	53	7

== Honours ==
=== Club ===
==== Felda United ====
- Malaysia Premier League: 2018
