= Yahor Zubovich =

Belarusian footballer

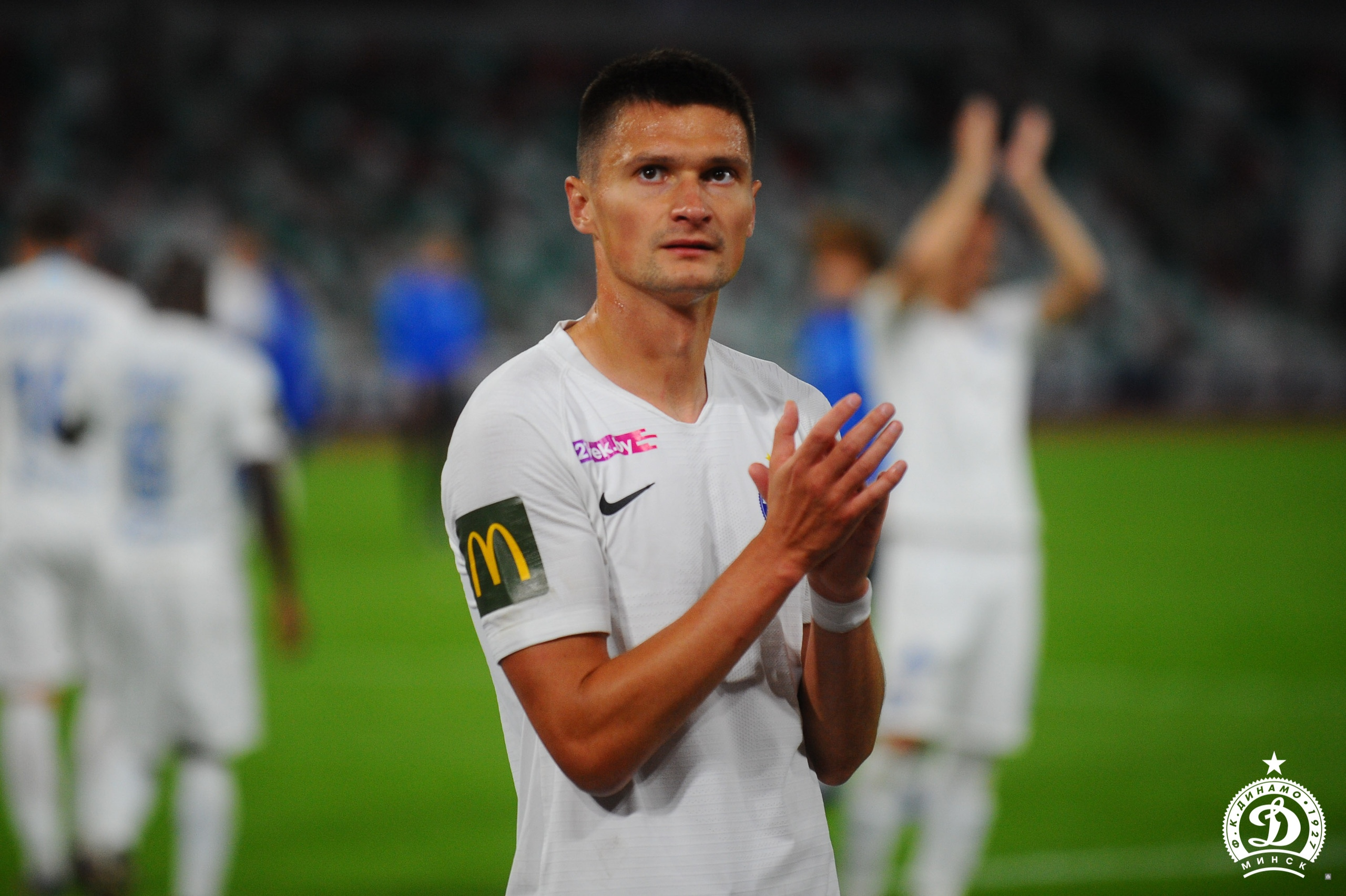

Personal information
- Full name: Yahor Vyachaslavavich Zubovich
- Date of birth: 1 June 1989 (age 37)
- Place of birth: Uzda, Byelorussian SSR, Soviet Union
- Height: 1.84 m (6 ft 1/2 in)
- Position: Forward

Team information
- Current team: Minsk
- Number: 17

Youth career
- 2005–2007: MTZ-RIPO Minsk

Senior career*
Years	Team	Apps	(Gls)
2005	Torpedo-SKA Minsk	1	(0)
2006	PMC Postavy	28	(4)
2007	MTZ-RIPO Minsk	12	(2)
2008–2009	Dinamo Minsk	5	(0)
2009	→ Torpedo Zhodino (loan)	22	(2)
2010	Partizan Minsk	29	(8)
2011	Belshina Bobruisk	32	(11)
2012–2015	Jagiellonia Bialystok	0	(0)
2012–2013	→ Naftan Novopolotsk (loan)	43	(5)
2013–2014	→ Neman Grodno (loan)	45	(16)
2015	→ Slutsk (loan)	26	(8)
2016	Dinamo Minsk	21	(5)
2017	Torpedo-BelAZ Zhodino	30	(16)
2018	Melaka United	22	(12)
2019	Dinamo Minsk	27	(8)
2020	Zhetysu	19	(1)
2021–2025	Neman Grodno	126	(32)
2026–	Minsk	13	(2)

International career
2007–2008	Belarus U19	6	(0)
2008–2009	Belarus U21	5	(0)
2011–2012	Belarus Olympic	7	(1)
- * Club domestic league appearances and goals as of 6 July 2026

Yahor Vyachaslavavich Zubovich (Belarusian: Ягор Вячаслававiч Зубовіч; Russian: Егор Вячеславович Зубович; born 1 June 1989) is a Belarusian professional footballer who plays for Minsk.

== Club career ==
Born in Uzda, Zubovich began playing football in the FC Torpedo-SKA Minsk youth system. He made one senior appearance for the club in the Belarusian Second League before leaving for FC MTZ-RIPO where he made his Belarusian Premier League debut in 2007. On January 1, 2018, he moved to the Malaysian Super League team Melaka United.

== International career ==
During 2008–09, Zubovich was involved in the youth team of Belarus. At youth level, he played in 5 official matches. He played in 2 games for Belarus at the 2012 Summer Olympics.

== Honours ==
Naftan Novopolotsk

- Belarusian Cup: 2011–12
