= 2018 Malaysia Premier League =

100Plus Malaysia Premier League
- Season: 2018
- Dates: 1 February – 27 July 2018
- Champions: Felda United; 2nd Second Division title
- Promoted: Felda United; Felcra
- Relegated: Terengganu II
- Matches: 110
- Goals: 325 (2.95 per match)
- Top goalscorer: Casagrande (19 goals)
- Biggest home win: Sabah 4–0 Terengganu II (2 February 2018); Kuantan 4–0 UKM (23 February 2018); MIFA 4–0 UiTM (14 April 2018); Sarawak 5–2 Terengganu II (21 July 2018); Johor Darul Ta'zim II 4–0 UKM (27 July 2018)
- Biggest away win: PDRM 2–6 Felda United (6 February 2018)
- Highest scoring: 8 goals PDRM 2–6 Felda United (6 February 2018)
- Longest winning run: 7 matches Felda United
- Longest unbeaten run: 12 matches Felcra
- Longest winless run: 8 matches Johor Darul Ta'zim II
- Longest losing run: 4 matches UKM
- All statistics correct as of 27 July 2018.

The 2018 Malaysia Premier League, known as 2018 100Plus Malaysia Premier League for sponsorship reasons, was the 15th season of the Malaysia Premier League, the second-tier professional football league in Malaysia since its establishment in 2004.

== Team changes ==
A total of 12 teams contested the league, including 6 sides from the 2017 season, four relegated from the 2017 Malaysia Super League and four promoted from the 2017 Malaysia FAM League.

=== To Premier League ===
Relegated from Super League

- Felda United ^{2}
- Sarawak
- Penang
- Terengganu II ^{2}

Promoted from FAM League

- UKM
- Felcra ^{1}

=== From Premier League ===
Promoted to Super League

- Kuala Lumpur
- Negeri Sembilan ^{2}
- PKNP ^{2}
- Terengganu

Relegated to FAM League

- ATM
- Perlis

Notes:

^1 Originally Sime Darby were promoted along with UKM as finalists of the 2017 Malaysia FAM League final, but after Sime Darby announced their withdrawal from the Premier League participation, Felcra, the next highest team in the FAM League table, were invited as replacement.

^2 FELDA United were relegated to Premier League after failing to receive the FAM License to compete in the Super League; while T-Team were relegated to Premier League after their absorption to Terengganu, rebranding as Terengganu II and change of their status as reserve team to Terengganu. Negeri Sembilan and PKNP, 2 highest teams in the Premier League with FAM License, were promoted to Super League in their place.

== Disbandment of Kuantan FA ==
After failing to settle bad debt with former players for last season campaign, 4 months failing to pay current team wages. and unable to turn up for a league fixture against PDRM, FMLLP decided to disqualify Kuantan from the rest of the campaign. Because of their disqualification, all points that were won by other teams against Kuantan will not count and the league was left with 11 teams out of initial 12 with teams that were due to play Kuantan were given a bye week. It is the first time this has ever occurred in the professional level of Malaysian football where a team is disallowed to compete after breaking the rules and regulations with the season on-going.

Kuantan stated that Marcerra (the team that bought their license) wanted to take over the bad debts amounted to RM 3.5 million and clear all the overdue payment from last season. But it seemed fruitless as after 4 months into the league campaign, the problem was still unsettled as the current squad players decided to leave the team and opted to join teams in the FAM league. Kuantan were awarded RM 500,000 annual grant but minus RM 200,000 for fined after failing to complete their registration papers.

== Stadium and locations ==
Locations of teams in the 2018 Malaysia Premier League teams

Note: Table lists in alphabetical order.

Team	Location	Stadium	Capacity
Felcra	Shah Alam	Shah Alam Stadium	80,372
Felda United	Jengka	Tun Abdul Razak Stadium	25,000
Johor Darul Ta'zim II	Pasir Gudang	Pasir Gudang Corporation Stadium	15,000
MIFA	Petaling Jaya	Petaling Jaya Stadium	25,000
PDRM	Shah Alam	Shah Alam Stadium	80,372
Penang	Batu Kawan	Penang State Stadium	40,000
Sabah	Kota Kinabalu	Likas Stadium	35,000
Sarawak	Kuching	Sarawak State Stadium	26,000
Terengganu II	Kuala Terengganu	Sultan Ismail Nasiruddin Shah Stadium	15,000
UiTM	Shah Alam	UiTM Stadium	10,000
UKM	Selayang	Selayang Stadium	11,098

=== Personnel and sponsoring ===
Note: Flags indicate national team as has been defined under FIFA eligibility rules. Players may hold more than one non-FIFA nationality.

Team	Head coach	Captain	Kit manufacturer	Shirt sponsor(s)
Felcra	(Brazil) Tarcísio Pugliese	(Malaysia) Shahrom Kalam	Uhlsport	FELCRA, HeMAT
Felda United	(Malaysia) B. Sathianathan	(Malaysia) Shukor Adan	FBT	FELDA, Hotel Tenera
Johor Darul Ta'zim II	(Mexico) Benjamin Mora	(Malaysia) Shakir Shaari	Nike	Forest City
MIFA	(Malaysia) K. Devan	(Liberia) Kpah Sherman	Puma	MIFA, MAHSA University
PDRM	(Malaysia) Zulhamizan Zakaria	(Malaysia) Fauzi Majid	Line 7	ODR Lubricants
Penang	(Malaysia) Zainal Abidin	(Malaysia) Azrul Ahmad	Puma	
Sabah	(Malaysia) Jelius Ating	(Malaysia) Rawilson Batuil	Carino	Sawit Kinabalu, Sabah Energy Corp, Asian Supply Base
Sarawak	(Australia) Ian Gillan	(Malaysia) Hairol Mokhtar	Starsport	
Terengganu II	(Malaysia) Mustaffa Kamal	(Malaysia) Hasbullah Awang	Kobert	Chicken Cottage
UiTM	(Malaysia) Wan Mustaffa Wan Ismail	(Malaysia) Afif Asyraf	Puma	Soaring Upwards, UiTM Holdings
UKM	(Malaysia) Sulaiman Husin	(Malaysia) Asnan Ahmad	SkyHawk	Kopi Pak Belalang, Fusionex

=== Coaching changes ===
Note: Flags indicate national team as has been defined under FIFA eligibility rules. Players may hold more than one non-FIFA nationality.

Team	Outgoing coach	Manner of departure	Date of vacancy	Position in table	Incoming coach	Date of appointment
Terengganu II	(Indonesia) Rahmad Darmawan	Resigned	23 November 2017	Pre-season	(Malaysia) Mustaffa Kamal	27 November 2017
PDRM	(Malaysia) Fauzi Pilus	End of contract	31 October 2017	Pre-season	(Malaysia) Zulhamizan Zakaria	28 November 2017
Sarawak	(Malaysia) Pengiran Bala	End of caretaker role	1 December 2017	Pre-season	(Australia) Ian Gillan	2 December 2017
MIFA	(Malaysia) Jacob Joseph	End of contract	31 October 2017	Pre-season	(Malaysia) K. Devan	3 December 2017
Felcra	(Malaysia) Rosle Md. Derus	Reassigned as assistant coach	22 December 2017	Pre-season	(Brazil) Tarcísio Pugliese	22 December 2017
Kuantan	(Malaysia) Zulhamizan Zakaria	Resigned	28 November 2017	Pre-season	(Malaysia) Ismail Zakaria	1 December 2017
PDRM	(Malaysia) Zulhamizan Zakaria	End of contract	31 July 2018	5th	(Malaysia) Fauzi Pilus	1 August 2018
Johor Darul Ta'zim II	(Mexico) Benjamin Mora	Promoted to JDT I	10 August 2018	4th	(Croatia) Ervin Boban	11 August 2018

=== Foreign players ===
The number of foreign players is restricted to four each team including at least one player from the AFC country.

Note: Flags indicate national team as has been defined under FIFA eligibility rules. Players may hold more than one non-FIFA nationality.

Club	Player 1	Player 2	Player 3	AFC player	Former player ^{3}
Felcra	(Brazil) Léo Carioca	(Brazil) Endrick	(Brazil) Casagrande	(Indonesia) David Laly	
Felda United	(Brazil) Thiago Junio	(Brazil) Gilberto Fortunato	(Brazil) Thiago Fernandes	(Philippines) Iain Ramsay	
Johor Darul Ta'zim II	(Brazil) Bruno Soares	(Argentina) **Nicolás Fernández**	(France) **Harry Novillo**		(Singapore) Hafiz Sujad (Brazil) Murilo Damasceno (Argentina) **Lucas Ontivero**
MIFA	(Brazil) Elizeu	(Liberia) Kpah Sherman	(France) L'Imam Seydi	(South Korea) Bae Beom-geun	
PDRM	(Montenegro) Argzim Redžović	(South Korea) Shim Un-seob	(Romania) Petrisor Voinea	(Japan) Shunsuke Nakatake	
Penang	(Nigeria) Ugo Ukah	(The Gambia) Sanna Nyassi	(Nigeria) **Chidi Edeh**	(South Korea) Kang Seung-jo	(Denmark) Ken Ilsø
Sabah	(Zambia) Francis Kasonde	(Serbia) **Rodoljub Paunović**	(Puerto Rico) Pito Ramos	(Japan) **Keisuke Ogawa**	(South Korea) Heo Jae-nyeong (South Korea) Lee Kil-Hoon
Sarawak	(Serbia) Nebojsa Marinkovic	(Croatia) Mateo Roskam	(Montenegro) Miloš Raičković	(South Korea) Kim Chi-gon	
Terengganu II	(Haiti) Andrew Jean-Baptiste	(Haiti) Sébastien Thurière	(Nigeria) Akanni-Sunday Wasiu	(Japan) **Bruno Suzuki**	(South Korea) Lee Jun-hyeob
UiTM	(The Gambia) **Mamadou Danso**	(Kyrgyzstan) **Venyamin Shumeyko**	(Nigeria) **Okereke Timothy**	(South Korea) **Noh Sang-min**	(Japan) Kota Kawase (Argentina) Lucas Pugh (Ivory Coast) Dechi Marcel (Ivory Coast) Dao Bakary
UKM	(Nigeria) Waheed Oseni	(Morocco) Redouane Zerzouri	(Nigeria) **Michael Ijezie**	(South Korea) Nam Se-in	(Uganda) Atuheire Kipson

- Players name in **bold** indicates the player is registered during the mid-season transfer window.
- **^3** Foreign players who left their clubs or were de-registered from playing squad due to medical issues or other matters.

=== Naturalisation ===
Note: Flags indicate national team as has been defined under FIFA eligibility rules. Players may hold more than one non-FIFA nationality.

Team	Player 1	Player 2
Felda United	(Scotland) (Malaysia) Stuart Wark^{3}	(Australia) (Malaysia) Curran Singh Ferns^{3}
Johor Darul Ta'zim II	(England) (Malaysia) Samuel Somerville^{3}	(New Zealand) (Malaysia) Ernest Wong^{3}
Sarawak	(Australia) (Malaysia) Shazalee Ramlee^{3}	

Notes:

^3 Carrying Malaysian heritage.
^4 Participated in the Malaysia national team squad.

== Results ==
=== League table ===
Pos	Team	Pld	W	D	L	GF	GA	GD	Pts	Promotion, qualification or relegation
1	Felda United (C, P)	20	12	7	1	44	24	+20	43	Promotion to 2019 Malaysia Super League
2	Felcra	20	9	7	4	30	24	+6	34	Withrew from Premier League and dissolved.
3	MIFA (P)	20	9	5	6	36	26	+10	32	Promotion to 2019 Malaysia Super League
4	Johor Darul Ta'zim II	20	8	6	6	28	23	+5	30	
5	PDRM	20	8	5	7	28	31	−3	29	
6	Sabah	20	7	7	6	35	26	+9	28	
7	UKM	20	6	4	10	26	32	−6	22	
8	Sarawak	20	6	4	10	27	35	−8	22	
9	UiTM	20	6	4	10	23	36	−13	22	
10	Penang	20	5	6	9	20	30	−10	21	
11	Terengganu II	20	4	5	11	22	34	−12	17	

Updated to match(es) played on 30 December 2018. Source: FAM, FMLLP
Rules for classification: 1) Points; 2) Goal difference; 3) Number of goals scored.
(C) Champions; (P) Promoted

=== Result table ===
Home \ Away	FCR	FEL	JDTII	MIF	PDRM	PEN	SAB	SWK	TRGII	UIT	UKM
Felcra	—	1–1	1–2	1–1	1–1	3–1	1–0	2–0	3–1	1–0	2–1
Felda United	1–1	—	2–2	0–3	2–2	3–0	1–0	3–2	3–2	2–0	0–0
Johor Darul Ta'zim II	1–2	1–4	—	0–1	1–0	2–1	1–1	2–0	2–1	2–2	4–0
MIFA	1–2	2–3	1–1	—	2–3	3–2	1–1	2–2	1–0	4–0	3–1
PDRM	1–3	2–6	0–0	2–0	—	1–0	3–2	1–0	0–0	1–2	2–2
Pulau Pinang	2–1	1–1	2–0	0–2	3–1	—	2–1	0–1	0–0	0–0	2–1
Sabah	3–0	1–1	1–1	3–2	2–0	0–0	—	1–1	4–0	3–1	1–3
Sarawak	2–3	1–3	0–2	1–0	2–1	1–1	3–2	—	5–2	0–2	2–1
Terengganu II	1–1	0–2	2–1	1–2	1–2	1–1	1–2	1–1	—	2–3	1–0
UiTM	1–1	1–4	0–2	0–2	1–3	3–1	0–3	3–2	2–3	—	2–0
UKM	2–0	1–2	1–0	3–3	1–2	3–1	3–2	2–1	1–2	0–0	—

Updated to match(es) played on 27 July 2018. Source: FAM
Legend: Blue = home team win; Yellow = draw; Red = away team win.

=== Positions by round ===
Leader	Relegation to 2019 Malaysia FAM League	Disqualified	Qualified to 2018 Malaysia Cup

Team ╲ Round	1	2	3	4	5	6	7	8	9	10	11	12	13	14	15	16	17	18	19	20
Felda United	3	1	1	1	1	1	1	1	1	1	1	1	1	1	1	1	1	1	1	1
Felcra	5	7	4	4	5	4	4	2	2	2	2	2	3	2	2	2	2	2	2	2
MIFA	7	8	5	5	6	6	5	7	7	8	4	3	2	3	4	4	5	3	3	3
Johor Darul Ta'zim II	6	6	9	11	12	11	11	12	11	11	11	8	8	8	6	6	6	6	5	4
PDRM	8	10	12	8	10	9	7	6	5	6	3	3	4	4	3	3	3	5	6	5
Sabah	1	2	2	2	2	2	3	4	3	3	5	5	5	5	5	5	4	4	4	6
UKM	10	12	7	10	11	12	12	11	10	10	10	9	9	9	7	7	7	9	7	7
Sarawak	4	4	6	7	4	3	2	3	4	5	6	6	6	6	8	8	8	10	8	8
UiTM	2	3	3	3	3	5	6	5	6	4	7	7	7	7	10	10	10	7	9	9
Penang	11	5	8	9	7	7	8	8	8	7	8	9	10	11	9	9	9	8	10	10
Terengganu II	12	11	11	12	9	10	9	9	9	9	9	11	11	10	11	11	11	11	11	11
Kuantan	9	9	10	6	8	8	10	10	DQ	DQ	DQ	DQ	DQ	DQ	DQ	DQ	DQ	DQ	DQ	DQ

== Season statistics ==
=== Top scorers ===
As of matches played on 27 July 2018.

Players sorted first by goals scored, then by last name.

Rank	Player	Club	Goals
1	(Brazil) Casagrande	Felcra	19
2	(Malaysia) Bobby Gonzales	Sarawak	14
2	(Puerto Rico) Hector Ramos	Sabah	14
2	(Liberia) Kpah Sherman	MIFA	14
2	(Brazil) Thiago Fernandes	Felda United	14
6	(Nigeria) Akanni-Sunday Wasiu	Terengganu II	12
7	(Brazil) Gilberto Fortunato	Felda United	10
8	(Croatia) Mateo Roskam	Sarawak	9

=== Top assists ===
Players sorted first by assists, then by last name.

Rank	Player	Club	Assists
1	(Brazil) Endrick	Felcra	10
1	(Argentina) Nicolás Fernández	Johor Darul Ta'zim II	10
3	(Philippines) Iain Ramsay	Felda United	9
4	(South Korea) Bae Beom-geun	MIFA	8
5	(Malaysia) Maxsius Musa	Sabah	7

=== Hat-tricks ===
Player	For	Against	Result	Date
(Brazil) Gilberto Fortunato	Felda United	PDRM	6–2 (A)	6 February 2018
(Brazil) Casagrande	Felcra	Sarawak	3–2 (A)	10 February 2018
(Montenegro) Žarko Korać	Kuantan	UKM	4–0 (H)	23 February 2018
(Brazil) Casagrande	Felcra	Terengganu II	3–1 (H)	21 May 2018

Notes:
(H) – Home; (A) – Away

=== Own goals ===
Rank	Player	For	Against	Date	Goals
1	(Malaysia) Daudsu Jamaluddin	Kuantan	UiTM	10 February 2018	1
1	(Malaysia) Fazly Mazlan	Johor Darul Ta'zim II	Terengganu II	16 April 2018	1
1	(Haiti) Andrew Jean-Baptiste	Terengganu II	Sarawak	21 July 2018	1

=== Clean sheets ===
Rank	Player	Club	Clean sheets
1	(Malaysia) Farizal Harun	Felda United	5
1	(Malaysia) Muhaimin Mohamad	MIFA	5
1	(Malaysia) Sheril Anuar	PDRM	5
4	(Malaysia) Soffuan Tawil	UiTM	4
5	(Malaysia) Suhaimi Husin	Terengganu II	3
5	(Malaysia) Rozaimie Rohim	Sabah	3
7	(Malaysia) Robson Rendy Rining	Sabah	2
8	(Malaysia) Iqbal Suhaimi	Sarawak	1
8	(Malaysia) Abdul Gafur Samsudin	UKM	1

== See also ==
- 2018 Malaysia Super League
- 2018 Malaysia FAM Cup
- 2018 Malaysia FA Cup
- 2018 Malaysia Cup
- 2018 Malaysia Challenge Cup
- List of Malaysian football transfers 2018
