= Gilberto Fortunato =

Brazilian footballer (born 1987)

Personal information
- Full name: Gilberto Valdenésio Fortunato
- Date of birth: 11 July 1987 (age 39)
- Place of birth: Florianópolis, Brazil
- Height: 1.86 m (6 ft 1 in)
- Position: Forward

Team information
- Current team: Galo Maringá

Youth career
- 2000–2010: Guarani

Senior career*
Years	Team	Apps	(Gls)
2010–2012	Guarani	10	(0)
2012–2013	Bandeirante	31	(10)
2013–2014	Haiphong	21	(7)
2014	Tirana	12	(5)
2014	Flamurtari	12	(2)
2015	Gwangju	6	(1)
2015	Tirana	8	(0)
2016	PTT Rayong	3	(2)
2016	Drita	9	(2)
2017	PKNP	17	(9)
2018–2019	Felda United	18	(10)
2019	Sport Boys	11	(2)
2019–2020	Drita	12	(4)
2021	Hougang United	11	(4)
2022	Morrinhos	5	(0)
2023	Inhumas	4	(0)
2023	Iporá	10	(1)
2024–	Galo Maringá	4	(0)
- * Club domestic league appearances and goals as of 14 February 2024

Gilberto Valdenésio Fortunato (born 11 July 1987) is a Brazilian professional footballer who played as a forward for Galo Maringá.

== Club career ==
=== Early career ===
Gilberto previously played with Guarani, Bandeirante and Haiphong.

=== Hải Phòng ===
In 2013, Gilberto was transferred to Hải Phòng by signing a one-year deal. He scored the first goal for the club on 6 April 2013 in a 0–2 away win against Đà Nẵng. With Hải Phòng, he played 21 matches and scored seven times.

=== Tirana ===
In January 2014, Tirana was risking the relegation and the donors brought several players on trial, including Gilberto. He successfully passed the trial, and on 27 January, he penned an initial six-month contract with an option to extend it for one year.

Gilberto made his competitive debut for Tirana 1 February in the goalless draw against Kastrioti in the Albanian Superliga matchday 17, entering in the second half. Six days later, in his first Tirana derby against Partizani, Gilberto scored his maiden Tirana goal, the winner with an overhead kick in the 77th minute, returning the team to the winning ways after 9 consecutive matches. The loss caused the resignation of Partizani's coach, Hasan Lika. During the 0–1 win against Bylis at Adush Muça Stadium on 16 February, Gilberto suffered a stomach injury and was substituted in the 42nd minute following a dangerous play from the opposition players.

Gilberto returned to the scoresheet on 23 February by netting the temporary equalizer against Besa in an eventual 2–1 home win, leading Tirana to their third consecutive win. He continued to be a vital member in Tirana's bid to escape relegation, assisting Ndikumana's goal against Flamurtar for a 1–1 draw on 2 March and scoring a brace in the 3–1 home win over Kukësi the following week, removing Tirana from the last position in the standing. He was praised by the manager Gugash Magani following the match against Kukësi, who said that Gilberto was "the best player of the team". Gilberto himself stated that his aim was to score at last 10 goals until the end of the season.

After his good performances since joining the club, Gilberto begun negotiations for a new contract; however, he added that he was not sure about staying in Albania and the main reason were the incidents occurred in the match against Flamurtari. Gilberto suffered a groin strain injury in the 2–0 win over Laçi on 29 March, which forced him to be substituted. Following the examinations, it was confirmed that Gilberto would be sidelined for one month.

On 8 April, Gilberto agreed a contract extension, signing for another season, with the new deal including a significant wage rise. However, only two days later, after receiving an offer from an unknown Malaysian team, which was several times bigger than the amount of renewal with Tirana, Gilberto asked a transfer request from Tirana, in order to sign in Malaysia. He immediately asked to leave the club, and strengthened it by not appearing in the training session on 9 April. Gilberto did not leave, however, and returned in action on 26 April by starting in the 2–1 home win against Vllaznia.

Gilberto returned to the scoresheet on 4 May by netting his 5th of the campaign in the 2–2 away draw against Flamurtari; this result sealed Tirana's spot in the top flight for another season. In an interview with daily newspaper Panorama Sport, Gilberto stated that he'll go to the club which offers more money for him despite having signed a contract renewal with Tirana early on. He left Tirana after not finding a way to improve his contract. Following his departure, Gilberto stated that he did not request any raise, adding that Tirana offered him $95,000, which was later reduced, which according to him terminated the cooperation between parties.

=== Flamurtari ===
On 11 August 2014, Gilberto completed a transfer to fellow Albanian Superliga side Flamurtari as a free agent, signing a two-year contract worth $90,000 $ a season. During his presentation, he stated that despite being a target of several clubs such as Kukësi, Skënderbeu dhe Partizani, he joined Flamurtari for financial reasons. He also mentioned his former side Tirana, saying that the club has problems which are not solved, which prompted Tirana to deny his claims on their Facebook page.

Gilberto made his competitive debut on 17 August 2014 in the 2014 Albanian Supercup against Skënderbeu Korçë, playing the second half in an eventual 1–0 loss at Qemal Stafa Stadium. His league debut occurred six days later in the opening matchday against Teuta Durrës, scoring a goal and being named Man of the Match in a 2–1 home win. His next goal came on 27 September in the home match against Laçi which finished in a 1–1 draw valid for the 6th week.

On 4 October, during the match against Partizani, Gilberto was injured and replaced by fellow striker Arbër Abilaliaj in the 62nd minute as the match finished in a goalless draw. Following the examinations, it was confirmed that the injury was minor and Gilberto was likely to miss the following match against Skënderbeu on 17 October. He was included for the match, but started from the bench, appearing in the 74th minute as the match finished in a 1–1 draw.

On 21 December, Gilberto played the 17 minutes of the 0–1 home loss against title contenders Kukësi, the last match of 2014. Flamurtari ended the first part of the season 16 points away from the first position held by Kukësi and 14 points away from European spots. In personal terms, Gilberto managed to score only twice in 12 appearances, which nine of them were as starter. Before the match with Kukësi, Gilberto had agreed by consensus with the club to break the contract, to return to Brazil, where according to his agent, Alban Kashari, Gilberto has opened a business in his native country. However, if the striker would choose to play for another club in Albania, then he should pay Flamurtari the clause of 100 million lek. His departure was also confirmed Flamurtari's new coach Ernestino Ramella.

Two days after the match against Kukësi, Gilberto reopened the opportunity to play in Albania, after the interest shown by his former side Tirana, stating that the capital club must pay the clause to Flamurtari in order to negotiate with him. He described his time in Vlorë as positive and also added that division of the team brought negative results during the first part of the season.

=== Gwangju ===
On 14 January 2015, after officially leaving Flamurtari, Gilberto moved in South Korea where he signed a contract with K League Classic side Gwangju FC, worth $120,000. He made his debut in second tier of Korean football on 6 March 2015 against Incheon United, scoring a goal in the 32nd minute which was later attribute to Kim Dae-joong as an owngoal. Gilberto opened his scoring account for Gwangju on 15 April, heading a cross from the left in an eventual 2–1 away loss to Jeju United.

His experience in Korea was short-lived as he managed to play only in six matches, scoring once in the process. This made him request a return to Albania, where he was a target of his former club Tirana. Gilberto stated that he was willing to lower his wage to return to Tirana.

=== Return to Tirana ===
On 8 August 2015, Gilberto joined Tirana by signing for an undisclosed fee, returning after a year. He was allocated squad number 14 for the 2015–16 season, last worn by Francis Kahata. His return was strongly required by the club's fans.

Gilberto made his return debut with Tirana on 23 August 2015 in team's opening match of the season against newcomers of Tërbuni Pukë; his shot turned into a rebound for Masato Fukui's goal as Tirana won 2–1. In the first leg of 2015–16 Albanian Cup first round against Erzeni Shijak, Gilberto missed a penalty kick but Tirana managed to win both legs with the aggregate 3–0. He scored his first goals for Tirana in the first leg of second round against Kastrioti Krujë to help Tirana get a 1–5 win. On 3 November, following the league match against Kukësi in which he appeared in the last 24 minutes, Gilberto left Tirana after ending his contract by mutual consent. He finished his second spell with Tirana by making 11 appearances, including 8 in league, collecting 500 minutes, scoring twice, both of them in cup. In an interview, Gilberto said that he will never come back to play with an Albanian team again, saying that they [Albanian teams] have a lot of problems.

=== PTT Rayong ===
On 15 January 2016, Gilberto signed a contract until the end of the season with Thai Division 1 League side PTT Rayong, and was presented to the media in the very same day.

=== Drita ===
On 5 October 2016, Gilberto joined Drita of Football Superleague of Kosovo on a free transfer. He was allocated squad number 87 and until December he made 9 league appearances, scoring twice, including the winner against Liria on 20 November. He terminated his contract with Drita on 3 December to pursue a career outside of continent.

=== PKNP ===
On 14 January 2017, 29-year-old Gilberto went to Malaysia to sign a contract for the 2017 season with Malaysian team PKNP who plays in the second tier Malaysia Premier League. He scored his first goals in form of a brace twelve days later in the 2–0 home win over Kuantan FA in his second appearance for the club.

Gilberto then played his first Piala FA match on 14 February in the round of 32 tie versus Kelantan; the regular and extra-time finished in a 1–1 draw with sent the match to penalty shootout where Gilberto netted his team 4th attempt in an eventual 4–3 win. He returned to the score-sheet in championship on 7 April by netting a late winner at MISC-MIFA.

Gilberto made his first Malaysia Cup appearance on 4 July by starting in the opening match of Group A as PKNP won 2–1 at T–Team. His first goals of the competition came on 18 July in the 2–0 win versus Negeri Sembilan, netting both goals in the last minutes, including a penalty. It were Gilberto's first goals after five matches which earned the praise of manager Abu Bakar Fadzim.

Gilberto reached double figures on 19 September by scoring a brace in the 3–1 win against Negeri Sembilan, becoming the second PKNP player to achieve the feat in the 2017 season after Shahrel Fikri. He finished his first season with 29 appearances in all competitions, scoring 11 goals, including 9 in the championship as Perak finished 3rd to achieve promotion to top flight for the first time. Gilberto left the club in December 2017 following the end of the season.

=== FELDA United ===
On 20 December 2017, Gilberto completed a transfer to Malaysian top flight Felda United for an undisclosed fee. The club however was relegated to second tier for licence failure.

Gilberto was given squad number 10, and made his competitive debut on 2 February 2018 in the opening week of 2018 Malaysia Premier League, a 1–2 away win over UKM. He scored his first career hat-trick four days later in the match against PDRM FA, leading the team in a 6–2 home win. The feat was followed by a brace in the next week in the 3–0 home win over Penang FA, which lifted the striker tally up to 5 goals in 3 matches, his best career start; this win also lifted Felda on top of the league.

Gilberto concluded the 2018 season by scoring 10 goals in 18 league appearances, a personal best, aiding Felda to win the championship and achieve promotion to top flight next season. He scored a brace in the decisive match which decided the title, a 3–1 home win over Sarawak FA on 17 July. In Malaysia Cup, he scored four goals in seven appearances; Felda United was eliminated in the quarter-finals by Terengganu 6–4 on aggregate, with Gilberto scoring in both legs.

In January 2019, Gilberto, despite his impressive scoring record, left due to club's budget cut ahead of new Malaysia Super League season.

=== Sport Boys Warnes ===
On 11 January 2019, Gilberto completed a transfer to Bolivian club Sport Boys Warnes.

=== Return to Drita ===
On 10 July 2019, Gilberto was announced as the new player of Football Superleague of Kosovo side Drita on a one-year contract, marking his return to the club.

=== Later career ===
On 9 March 2021, Gilberto signed a short-term contract with Singaporean club Hougang United.

== Career statistics ==
As of 13 April 2019

Club statistics
Club	Season	League			Cup		Other		Total	
Club	Season	Division	Apps	Goals	Apps	Goals	Apps	Goals	Apps	Goals
Haiphong	2013	V.League 1	21	7	—		—		21	7
Tirana	2013–14	Albanian Superliga	12	5	—		—		12	5
Flamurtari	2014–15	Albanian Superliga	12	2	0	0	1 (Note: Appearance in Albanian Supercup)	0	13	2
Gwangju	2015	K League Classic	6	1	0	0	—		6	1
Tirana	2015–16	Albanian Superliga	8	0	3	2	—		11	2
PTT Rayong	2016	Thai League 2	3	2	0	0	—		3	2
Drita	2016–17	Superleague of Kosovo	9	2	0	0	—		9	2
PKNP	2017	Malaysia Premier League	17	9	8	2	4 (Note: All appearance(s) in Malaysia FA Cup)	0	29	11
Felda United	2018	Malaysia Premier League	18	10	4	2	7	4	29	16
Sport Boys Warnes	2019	Bolivian Primera División	11	2	0	0	—		11	2
FC Drita	2019–20	Superleague of Kosovo	14	5	1	0	—		15	5
Career total			117	40	15	6	12	5	144	51

== Honours ==
Flamurtari

- Albanian Supercup: Runner-up 2014

Felda United

- Malaysia Premier League: 2018
