= Nagor Amir Noor Mohamed =

Malaysian football referee (born 1983)

- Full name: Nagor Amir bin Noor Mohamed
- Born: 2 May 1983 (age 43); Alor Setar, Kedah, Malaysia

Domestic
Years	League	Role
2011–	Malaysia Super League	Referee

International
Years	League	Role
2011–	FIFA listed	Referee

Nagor Amir Noor Mohamed (born 2 May 1983) is an international association football referee from Malaysia. He became a FIFA referee in 2011.

== Career ==
Nagor Amir became a professional referee in 2011 and has been an Malaysia Super League referee since 2011. He officiated numerous matches in the AFC Champions League and the AFC Cup.

Beside that, Nagor Amir has refereed a number of notable matches, including the 2012 AFC President's Cup, 2014 AFC Challenge Cup and 2014 WAFF Championship.

Nagor Amir refereed an AFC Asian Cup game for the first time on 29 March 2017 – a 2019 AFC Asian Cup qualification group match between Yemen and Tajikistan. The game in the Suheim Bin Hamad Stadium, Doha ended a 2–1 win for Yemen, with the referee showing three yellow cards.

== Achievement ==
National Football Award

- Best Referee : 2013
