= Suresh Jayaraman =

Malaysian football referee

- Full name: Suresh a/l Jayaraman
- Born: 6 November 1988 (age 37); Merlimau, Melaka, Malaysia

Domestic
Years	League	Role
2011-2018	Malaysia Premier League	Assistant referee
2016–2018	Malaysia Super League	Referee

Suresh Jayaraman is Malaysian football referee.
