= Wander Luiz (footballer, born 1987) =

Brazilian footballer

Personal information
- Full name: Wander Luiz Bitencourt Junior
- Date of birth: 30 May 1987 (age 39)
- Place of birth: Lamim, Brazil
- Height: 1.80 m (5 ft 11 in)
- Position: Attacking midfielder

Youth career
- Vila Nova

Senior career*
Years	Team	Apps	(Gls)
2005–2010	Vila Nova	12	(0)
2010–2011	Buriram	43	(8)
2011–2012	Ratchaburi	5	(0)
2012–2013	→ Suphanburi (loan)	27	(7)
2013–2014	América	40	(10)
2014	Atlético Huila	3	(0)
2014	Al-Fujairah	3	(0)
2014–2015	Ulsan Hyundai	4	(0)
2015	XV de Piracicaba	6	(0)
2015–2016	Ratchaburi	24	(3)
2016	Tombense	1	(0)
2016–2017	Kelantan	10	(4)
2017–2018	Al-Raed	24	(3)
2018–2020	Perak FA	33	(9)
2020–2021	Mesaimeer		
- * Club domestic league appearances and goals

Wander Luiz Bitencourt Junior or simply Wander Luiz (born May 30, 1987 in Lamim), is a Brazilian professional footballer. Luiz plays mainly as an attacking midfielder and also can be deployed as a forward.

== Club career ==
=== Vila Nova, Buriram, Ratchaburi, Suphanburi (loan) ===
Luiz debuted in 2005 with Vila Nova, where he remained there for 5 years before he moved to Thai Division 1 side Buriram (now known as Songkhla United and played for 2 seasons.

In 2012, Luiz later moved to Ratchaburi where he won the title of Thai Division 1 and got the team promoted to Thai Premier League the top tier of Thailand Football League. Luiz was loaned to Suphanburi for the 2012 season.

=== América, Atletico Huila, Al-Fujairah ===
He was later confirmed to become part of Colombian club América for 2013 season. At the end of Categoría Primera B first half, Wander helped the team to qualify to the semifinal where he played 21 games and scored 8 goals and being the first Brazilian player to quality to the second phase of the tournament and ended the season with 10 goals after 40 games. He later moved to the Categoría Primera A side (the top tier of Colombian Football League), Atletico Huila in 2014 but did not completed the season as he later moved to UAE Arabian Gulf League side, Al-Fujairah.

=== Ulsan Hyundai, XV de Piracicaba, Ratchaburi, Tombense ===
In July 2014, Luiz left Al-Fujairah and signed a contract with K League Classic club Ulsan Hyundai. In 2015, Luiz joined XV de Piracicaba before moved to his former club Ratchaburi which playing in the top-tier of Thai Football League, Thailand Premier League. In March 2016, he joined Tombense.

=== Kelantan ===
On 18 June 2016, Luiz signed a contract with Malaysia Super League side Kelantan. On 12 July 2016, Luiz made his debut for Kelantan during Malaysia Cup group stage in a 1–0 win over Pahang at their home Sultan Muhammad IV Stadium. His league debut came on 15 July 2016 which resulted in massive 6–1 win over Terengganu at away team ground with him putting on an excellent performance by scoring 1 goal which is the second goal of the match and provided an assist for Baže Ilijoski for the sixth goal.

=== Al-Raed ===
After his contract with Kelantan expired, Luiz signed a contract with Saudi club Al-Raed. On 1 February 2017, Luiz made Saudi Professional League in a 1–3 defeat to Al-Fateh coming off from the bench at second half of the match. His first league goal came in 1–1 draw over Al-Faisaly on 17 February 2017.

=== Perak ===
On 10 January 2018, it was announced that Luiz signed a contract with Malaysia Super League club Perak. Luiz were given jersey number 10.

== Career statistics ==
=== Club ===
As of 28 July 2018.

Appearances and goals by club, season and competition
Club	Season	League			Cup^{1}		League Cup^{2}		Continental		Total	
Club	Season	Division	Apps	Goals	Apps	Goals	Apps	Goals	Apps	Goals	Apps	Goals
Vila Nova	2009	Campeonato Mineiro	8	1	–		—		–		8	1
Vila Nova	2010	Campeonato Mineiro	6	0	–		—		–		6	0
Vila Nova	Total		14	1	–		—		–		14	1
Buriram	2011	Thai Division 1	43	8	–		—		–		43	8
Buriram	Total		43	8	–		—		–		43	8
Suphanburi	2012	Thai Division 1	27	7	–		—		–		27	7
Suphanburi	Total		27	7	–		—		–		27	7
América	2013	Primera B	40	10	5	1	—		–		45	11
América	Total		40	10	5	1	—		–		45	11
Ulsan Hyundai	2014	K League	4	0	–		—		–		4	0
Ulsan Hyundai	Total		4	0	–		—		–		4	0
XV de Piracicaba	2015	Campeonato Paulista	6	0	–		—		–		6	0
XV de Piracicaba	Total		6	0	–		—		–		6	0
Ratchaburi	2015	Thai League 1	17	6	–		—		–		17	6
Ratchaburi	Total		17	6	–		—		–		17	6
Tombense	2016	Campeonato Mineiro	1	0	–		—		–		1	0
Tombense	Total		1	0	–		—		–		1	0
Kelantan	2016	Malaysia Super League	10	4	–		6	1	–		16	5
Kelantan	Total		10	4	–		6	1	–		16	5
Al-Raed	2016–17	Saudi Professional League	10	2	1	0	0	0	–	–	11	2
Al-Raed	2017–18	Saudi Professional League	14	1	0	0	1	0	–	–	15	1
Al-Raed	Total		24	3	1	0	1	0	–	–	26	3
Perak	2018	Malaysia Super League	22	7	4	4	0	0	–	–	26	11
Perak	Total		22	7	4	4	0	0	–	–	26	11
Career Total			0	0	0	0	0	0	–	–	0	0

^{1} Includes Copa Colombia, Malaysia FA Cup and King Cup matches.
^{2} Includes Malaysia Cup and Crown Prince Cup matches.

== Honours ==
=== Club ===
Perak TBG F.C.

- Malaysia Cup Winner (1): 2018
