= List of Malaysian football transfers 2016 (June-July) =

The following is a list of transfers for 2016 Malaysian football. For the first transfer window, please see List of Malaysian football transfers 2016.

== Malaysia Super League ==
The 2016 Malaysia Super League (also known as Liga Super Malaysia 2016) is the 13th season of the highest Malaysian football league since its inception in 2004. 12 teams participated in the league with Johor Darul Ta'zim as the defending champions.

The second transfer window started on 20 June until on 17 July 2016.

=== Felda United ===
==== Transfers in ====
Date	Name	From
13 May 2016	(Malaysia) B. Sanjef Dinesh	(Malaysia) DRB-Hicom F.C.
15 May 2016	(Malaysia) Mohd Shazrul Ashraf	(Malaysia) Perlis FA
15 May 2016	(Malaysia) Muhd Amin Asraf Yaakob	(Malaysia) Negeri Sembilan U21
11 July 2016	(Malaysia) Ahmad Fakri Saarani	(Malaysia) Kedah FA (Loan)

==== Transfers out ====
Date	Name	To
20 May 2016	(Malaysia) Faris Syazwan Mohamad	(Malaysia) PBMM F.C.
14 May 2016	(Malaysia) Muhd Fadzil Shah Hussaini	(Malaysia) Negeri Sembilan U19
20 June 2016	(Malaysia) Ahmad Ezrie Shafizie	(Malaysia) Melaka United (Loan)
20 June 2016	(Malaysia) Mohd Ferris Danial	(Malaysia) Melaka United (Loan)
1/7/2016	(Malaysia) Mohd Zul Fahmi Awang	(Malaysia) Sime Darby F.C. (Loan)
11 July 2016	(Brazil) Thiago Augusto Fernandes	(Malaysia) Kedah FA (Loan)

=== Johor Darul Ta'zim ===
==== Transfers in ====
Name	From
(Malaysia) Dominic Tan	(Malaysia) JDT II
(Malaysia) Hasbullah Abu Bakar	(Malaysia) JDT II
(Malaysia) Mohd Azrif Nasrulhaq	(Malaysia) Selangor FA

==== Transfers out ====
Name	To
(Malaysia) Akram Mahinan	(Malaysia) JDT II
(Malaysia) Amer Saidin	(Malaysia) JDT II

=== Kedah FA ===
==== Transfers in ====
Date	Name	From
11 July 2016	(Brazil) Thiago Augusto Fernandes	(Malaysia) Felda United F.C. (Loan)
12 July 2016	(New Zealand) Shane Smeltz	(Australia) Sydney FC

==== Transfers out ====
Date	Name	To
11 July 2016	(Malaysia) Ahmad Fakri Saarani	(Malaysia) Felda United F.C. (Loan)
11/7/2016	(Brazil) Sandro da Silva Mendonça	Released

=== Kelantan FA ===
==== Transfers in ====
Date	Name	From
18 June 2016	(Brazil) Wander Luiz	(Brazil) Tombense Futebol Clube
11 July 2016	(Senegal) Morgaro Gomis	(Scotland) Heart of Midlothian
17 July 16	(Malaysia) Mohd Faris Shah Rosli	(Malaysia) Kelantan FA U21
17 July 16	(Malaysia) Mohd Syafiq Abdul Rahman	(Malaysia) Kelantan FA U21

==== Transfers out ====
Date	Name	To
7 May 2016	(Malaysia) Tuan Muhamad Faim	(Malaysia) MOF F.C. (loan)
7 May 2016	(Malaysia) Rozaimi Azwar	(Malaysia) MOF F.C. (loan)
2 June 2016	(Brazil) Jonatan Lucca	Released
2 June 2016	(Mali) Dramane Traoré	Released
11 July 2016	(Malaysia) Mohd Farisham Ismail	(Malaysia) Penang FA (loan)

=== Pahang FA ===
==== Transfers in ====
Date	Name	From
20/6/2016	(Argentina) Pablo Vranjicán	(Chile) Curicó Unido
20/6/2016	(Afghanistan) Faysal Shayesteh	(Thailand) Songkhla United F.C.
20/6/2016	(Brazil) Jailton	(Brazil) Esporte Clube Bahia
20/6/2016	(Chile) Claudio Meneses	(Chile) San Luis de Quillota
20/6/2016	(Malaysia) Kogileswaran Raj	(Malaysia) Frenz United
20/6/2016	(Malaysia) R. Dinesh	(Malaysia) Frenz United
20/6/2016	(Malaysia) Helmi Eliza Elias	Free Agents

==== Transfers out ====
Date	Name	To
20/6/2016	(Slovenia) Nejc Potokar	Released
20/6/2016	(Slovenia) Dalibor Volaš	Released
20/6/2016	(Argentina) Germán Pacheco	(Thailand) Ratchaburi Mitr Phol F.C.
30/6/2016	(Pakistan) Zesh Rehman	Released

=== PDRM FA ===
==== Transfers in ====
Date	Name	From
15 June 2016	(Brazil) Guilherme de Paula Lucrécio	(Cyprus) Ethnikos Achna FC
29 June 2016	(Malaysia) Mohd Fakrul Aiman Sidid	(Malaysia) DRB-Hicom F.C.
30 June 2016	(Malaysia) Muhd Eskandar Ismail	Free Agents
30 June 2016	(Malaysia) Mohd Fauzi Abdul Majid	(Malaysia) Perlis FA

==== Transfers out ====
Date	Name	To
31 May 2016	(Maldives) Ali Ashfaq	(Maldives) Maziya S&RC
15 June 2016	(Malaysia) Shafiq Jamal	Released
29/6/2016	(Malaysia) Muhd Safwan Hashim	(Malaysia) DRB-Hicom F.C.
29/6/2016	(Malaysia) Muhd Izuan Salahuddin	(Malaysia) DRB-Hicom F.C.
	(Malaysia)	(Malaysia)

=== Penang FA ===
==== Transfers in ====
Date	Name	From
10/7/2016	(Nigeria) Ranti Martins	(India) East Bengal F.C.
10/7/2016	(South Korea) Jeong Seok-min	(South Korea) Jeonnam Dragons
	(Malaysia)	(Malaysia)
	(Malaysia)	(Malaysia)
	(Malaysia)	(Malaysia)

==== Transfers out ====
Date	Name	To
10/7/2016	(Nigeria) Osas Saha	Released
10/7/2016	(Australia) Brent Griffiths	Released
	(Malaysia)	(Malaysia)
	(Malaysia)	(Malaysia)
	(Malaysia)	(Malaysia)

=== Perak FA ===
==== Transfers in ====
Date	Name	From
	(Albania) Xhevahir Sukaj	(Albania) FK Partizani Tirana
	(Uzbekistan) Oybek Kilichev	(Uzbekistan) Pakhtakor Tashkent FK
	(Malaysia) Razali Umar Kandasamy	Free Agents
	(Malaysia) Muhd Syahmil Khairi	Free Agents
	(Malaysia) Tuah Iskandar	(Malaysia) JDT II
	(Malaysia) Mohd Irfan Abdul Ghani	(Malaysia) JDT II

==== Transfers out ====
Date	Name	To
May 2016	(Liberia) Erick Weeks Lewis	(Indonesia) Madura United F.C.
	(Uzbekistan) Vokhid Shodiev	Released
	(Malaysia)	(Malaysia)
	(Malaysia)	(Malaysia)

=== Sarawak FA ===
==== Transfers in ====
Date	Name	From
5/7/2016	(Liberia) Teah Dennis	(Liberia) Barrack Young Controllers FC

==== Transfers out ====
Date	Name	To
30/6/2016	(Italy) Davide Grassi	Released
	(Malaysia)	(Malaysia)

=== Selangor FA ===
==== Transfers in ====
Date	Name	From
9/7/2016	(Nigeria) Ugo Ukah	(Greece) AEL Kalloni F.C.

==== Transfers out ====
Date	Name	To
31 May 2016	(Malaysia) Muhd Rahmat Zainol	(Malaysia) AirAsia F.C.
11 July 2016	(Australia) Robert Cornthwaite	(Australia) Western Sydney Wanderers FC
14 July 2016	(Malaysia) Mohd Azrif Nasrulhaq	(Malaysia) JDT

=== Terengganu FA ===
==== Transfers in ====
Date	Name	From
1/7/2016	(Malaysia) Muhd Radhi Yusof	(Malaysia) T-Team F.C.
1/7/2016	(Malaysia) Mohd Hasrol Syawal Hamid	(Malaysia) Hanelang F.C.
1/7/2016	(Malaysia) Mohd Suhaimi Husin	(Malaysia) Hanelang F.C.
10/7/2016	(Montenegro) Bogdan Milić	(Spain) CA Osasuna
15/7/2016	(Armenia) Karen Harutyunyan	(Armenia) FC Pyunik

==== Transfers out ====
Date	Name	To
31 May 2016	(Malaysia) Amirizdwan Taj	Released
10/7/2016	(Argentina) Juan José Morales	Released
	(Malaysia)	(Malaysia)

=== T-Team F.C. ===
==== Transfers in ====
Pos.	Name	From
	(Malaysia)	(Malaysia)

==== Transfers out ====
Date	Name	To
1/7/2016	(Malaysia) Muhd Radhi Yusof	(Malaysia) Terengganu FA

== Malaysia Premier League ==
The 2016 Malaysia Premier League (Malaysian language: Liga Perdana Malaysia 2016) is the 13th season of the Malaysia Premier League since its inception in 2004. 12 teams participated in the league with Kedah as the reigning champions and currently play in the top flight of Malaysian football, Malaysia Super League.

The second transfer window started on 20 June until on 17 July 2016.

=== ATM FA ===
==== Transfers in ====
Pos.	Name	From
1/7/2016	(Kazakhstan) Boris Fomenkov	(Kazakhstan) FC Okzhetpes
1/7/2016	(Malaysia) Mohd Noraiman Talib	(Malaysia)
1/7/2016	(Malaysia) Faqih Ikhwan Mohd Fauzi	(Malaysia)
1/7/2016	(Malaysia) Suhairy Johari	(Malaysia)
1/7/2016	(Uzbekistan) Sirojiddin Rakhmatullaev	(Uzbekistan) FK Mash'al Mubarek
1/7/2016	(Kazakhstan) Gies Irisbekov	(Kazakhstan) FC Ordabasy
1/7/2016	(Kazakhstan) Khasan Abdukarimov	(Kazakhstan) FC Kyzylzhar

==== Transfers out ====
Pos.	Name	To
1/7/2016	(Malaysia) Muhd Zamri Yusuf	Released
1/7/2016	(Malaysia) Syafez Mohammad	Released
1/7/2016	(Malaysia) Faizul Azlie Saad	Released

=== DRB-Hicom FC ===
==== Transfers in ====
Date	Name	From
12/7/2016	(Cameroon) Cedric Mbarga	(Cameroon) Bamboutos FC
29/6/2016	(Malaysia) Muhd Safwan Hashim	(Malaysia) PDRM FA
29/6/2016	(Malaysia) Muhd Izuan Salahuddin	(Malaysia) PDRM FA
29/6/2016	(Malaysia) Ibrahim Aziz	(Malaysia) PBMM F.C.
29/6/2016	(Malaysia) Muhd Shamar Fadzil	Free Agents

==== Transfers out ====
Date	Name	To
13 May 2016	(Malaysia) B. Sanjef Dinesh	(Malaysia) Felda United F.C.
20 June 2016	(Malaysia) Mohd Fakrul Aiman Sidid	(Malaysia) PDRM FA
30/6/2016	(Denmark) Philip Lund	Released
	(Malaysia)	(Malaysia)
	(Malaysia)	(Malaysia)

=== Johor Darul Ta'zim II ===
==== Transfers in ====
Date	Name	From
12 June 2016	(Brazil) Rafael de Jesus Bonfim	(Brazil) Coritiba
27 June 2016	(Malaysia) Darren Lok	(England) Eastbourne Borough F.C.
30 June 2016	(Malaysia) Akram Mahinan	(Malaysia) Johor Darul Ta'zim F.C.
30 June 2016	(Malaysia) Amer Saidin	(Malaysia) Johor Darul Ta'zim F.C.
30 June 2016	(Malaysia) Sean Gan Giannelli	(Malaysia) JDT III
30 June 2016	(Malaysia) Shahwan Shaharudin	(Malaysia) JDT III
30 June 2016	(Malaysia) Shahrul Akmal Adnan	(Malaysia) Frenz United
30 June 2016	(Malaysia) Muhd Hadi Fayyadh	(Malaysia) Frenz United
30 June 2016	(Malaysia) Syafiq Heelmi Zainol Fikri	(Malaysia) Frenz United
30 June 2016	(Malaysia) Muhd Izaffiq Ruzi	(Malaysia) Frenz United
30 June 2016	(Malaysia) Muhd Azrul Haziq Aminuddin	(Malaysia) Frenz United

==== Transfers out ====
Date	Name	To
27/6/2016	(Malaysia) Stuart Wark	(Malaysia) Sabah FA
20/6/2016	(Malaysia) Shazalee Ramlee	(Malaysia) Kuantan FA
20/6/2016	(Malaysia) Curran Singh Ferns	(Malaysia) Negeri Sembilan FA
30/6/2016	(Malaysia) Hasbullah Abu Bakar	(Malaysia) Johor Darul Ta'zim F.C.
30/6/2016	(Malaysia) Dominic Tan	(Malaysia) Johor Darul Ta'zim F.C.
14/7/2016	(Malaysia) Tuah Iskandar	(Malaysia) Perak FA
14/7/2016	(Malaysia) Mohd Irfan Abdul Ghani	(Malaysia) Perak FA
14/7/2016	(Malaysia) Kevin Gunter	(Malaysia) UiTM F.C. (Loan)

=== Kuala Lumpur FA ===
==== Transfers in ====
Pos.	Name	From
11/7/2016	(Chile) Diego Inostroza	(Chile) Deportes La Pintana
20/6/2016	(Palestine) Jonathan Cantillana	(Chile) Club Deportivo Palestino
20/6/2016	(Malaysia) Muhd Nazri Ahmad	(Malaysia) Sabah FA
20/6/2016	(Malaysia) Ibrahim Syaihul	(Malaysia) Felcra F.C.
	(Malaysia)	(Malaysia)

==== Transfers out ====
Name	To
(Brazil) Casagrande	Released
(Australia) Mario Karlovic	Released
(Malaysia) Azidan Sarudin	(Malaysia) AirAsia F.C.
(Malaysia)	(Malaysia)
(Malaysia)	(Malaysia)

=== Kuantan FA ===
==== Transfers in ====
Date	Name	From
27/6/2016	(Malaysia) Shazalee Ramlee	(Malaysia) JDT II
27/6/2016	(South Korea) Shim Un-seob	(Myanmar) Phnom Penh Crown FC

==== Transfers out ====
Date	Name	To
31 May 2016	(Japan) Shunsuke Nakatake	Released
1/7/2016	(Malaysia) Rohaizad Zainal Abidin	Released

=== Melaka United ===
==== Transfers in ====
Date	Name	From
May 2016	(Malaysia) Muhd Najmuddin Samat	(Malaysia) Frenz United (Loan)
May 2016	(Malaysia) Mohd Syafiq Aidil Zuhuri	(Malaysia) JDT III
May 2016	(Malaysia) Hasrol Nizam Muhamat	(Malaysia) PBMM F.C.
27/6/2016	(Malaysia) Reeshafiq Alwi	(Malaysia) AirAsia F.C.
27/6/2016	(Malaysia) Mohd Ferris Danial	(Malaysia) Felda United F.C. (Loan)
27/6/2016	(Malaysia) Ahmad Ezrie Shafizie	(Malaysia) Felda United F.C. (Loan)
27/6/2016	(Palestine) Yashir Pinto	(Chile) Curicó Unido
27/6/2016	(Romania) Alexandru Tudose	Free Agents
27/6/2016	(Malaysia) Mohd Fadzley Rahim	(Malaysia) Sabah FA
27/6/2016	(Malaysia) Mohd Khuzaimie Piee	(Malaysia) PKNS F.C. (Loan)
27/6/2016	(Malaysia) Mohd Saiful Mustafa	Free Agents

==== Transfers out ====
Date	Name	To
May 2016	(Malaysia) Ahmad Shahir Ismail	(Malaysia) SAMB FC (Loan)
May 2016	(Malaysia) Mohd Syazwan Nordin	(Malaysia) SAMB FC (Loan)
1 May 2016	(Australia) (Malaysia) Stefan Petrovski	Passed away
May 2016	(Malaysia) V. Kavi Chelvan	Released
June 2016	(Malaysia) Mohamad Faiz Suhaimi	Released
June 2016	(Malaysia) Rusmanizam Roseland	Released
June 2016	(South Korea) Shin Jae-pil	Released
June 2016	(Montenegro) Balša Božović	Released

=== Negeri Sembilan FA ===
==== Transfers in ====
Pos.	Name	From
May 2016	(Malaysia) Muhd Fadzil Shah Hussaini	(Malaysia) Felda U19
20/6/2016	(Australia) Henrique	(Australia) Brisbane Roar FC
20/6/2016	(Malaysia) Curran Singh Ferns	(Malaysia) JDT II
20/6/2016	(Malaysia) Ben King	(England) Corinthian-Casuals F.C.
30/6/2016	(France) Goran Jerković	(Montenegro) FK Iskra Danilovgrad

==== Transfers out ====
Pos.	Name	To
May 2016	(Malaysia) Muhd Amin Asraf Yaakob	(Malaysia) Felda U21
31 May 2016	(Malaysia) Kevin Gunter	(Malaysia) JDT II (Loan Return)
20/6/2016	(Australia) Joel Chianese	Released
19/7/2016	(Australia) Andrew Nabbout	(Australia) Newcastle Jets FC
27/8/2016	(Australia) Henrique	(Australia) Adelaide United FC

=== Perlis FA ===
==== Transfers in ====
Date	Name	From
5/7/2016	(Jamaica) Damion Stewart	(Jamaica) Harbour View F.C.
11/7/2016	(Brazil) Charles Chad	(Brazil) Macaé Esporte Futebol Clube
11/7/2016	(South Korea) Park Yong-joon	(Cambodia) Nagaworld FC
	(Malaysia)	(Malaysia)

==== Transfers out ====
Date	Name	To
May 2016	(Malaysia) Mohd Shazrul Ashraf	(Malaysia) Felda U21
30/6/2016	(Nigeria) Obinna Nwaneri	Released
30/6/2016	(Liberia) Edward Junior Wilson	Released
30/6/2016	(New Zealand) Kayne Vincent	Released
30/6/2016	(Malaysia) Mohd Fauzi Abdul Majid	(Malaysia) PDRM FA

=== PKNS FC ===
==== Transfers in ====
Pos.	Name	From
	(Malaysia)	(Malaysia)
	(Malaysia)	(Malaysia)
	(Malaysia)	(Malaysia)
	(Malaysia)	(Malaysia)

==== Transfers out ====
Date	Name	To
31 May 2016	(Malaysia) K. Satish	(Malaysia) AirAsia F.C. (Loan)
27 June 2016	(Malaysia) Ahmad Khuzaimie Piee	(Malaysia) Melaka United (Loan)
1 June 2016	(Malaysia) Muhaimin Mohamad	(Malaysia) MOF F.C.
	(Malaysia)	(Malaysia)

=== Sabah FA ===
==== Transfers in ====
Date	Name	From
3 June 2016	(Brazil) Everton Souza Santos	(Oman) Al-Musannah SC
27 June 2016	(Malaysia) Stuart Wark	(Malaysia) JDT II
1 July 2016	(Bosnia and Herzegovina) Muamer Salibašić	(Bosnia and Herzegovina) HNK Orašje
1 July 2016	(Malaysia) Robson Rendy Rining	(Malaysia) Penjara F.C.
	(Malaysia)	(Malaysia)

==== Transfers out ====
Date	Name	To
1 June 2016	(Brazil) Marco Tulio	Released
20 June 2016	(Malaysia) Fadzley Rahim	(Malaysia) Melaka United
20 June 2016	(Malaysia) Muhd Nazri Ahmad	(Malaysia) Kuala Lumpur FA

=== Sime Darby FC ===
==== Transfers in ====
Date	Name	From
4/7/2016	(Nigeria) Obi Ikechukwu Charles	(Finland) Atlantis FC
5/7/2016	(Malaysia) Mohd Zul Fahmi Awang	(Malaysia) Felda United F.C.

==== Transfers out ====
Date	Name	To
30/6/2016	(South Korea) Lee Kil-hoon	Released
30/6/2016	(Malaysia) Faiz Hanif Adenan	Released

=== UITM FC ===
==== Transfers in ====
Date	Name	From
10/7/2016	(Malaysia) Kevin Gunter	(Malaysia) JDT II (Loan)
10/7/2016	(Malaysia) Yosri Derma Raju	(Malaysia) MISC-MIFA
10/7/2016	(Malaysia) Nik Syafiq Syazwan Nik Min	Free Agents
10/7/2016	(South Korea) Oh Joo-ho	(Cambodia) National Police Commissary F.C.
10/7/2016	(Guam) John Matkin	(Thailand) Chaiyaphum United F.C.
10/7/2016	(Central African Republic) Franklin Clovis Anzité	(Vietnam) Long An F.C.
10/7/2016	(Cameroon) Moustapha Moctar Belbi	Free Agents
10/7/2016	(Malaysia) Muhd Syafiq Ramli	Free Agents

==== Transfers out ====
Date	Name	To
30/6/2016	(Brazil) Eliel Da Cruz	Released
30/6/2016	(South Korea) Kang Jin-wook	Released
30/6/2016	(Kyrgyzstan) Pavel Matiash	Released
30/6/2016	(Uzbekistan) Pavel Purishkin	Released
30/6/2016	(Malaysia) G. Rohan	Released
30/6/2016	(Malaysia) Hakeem Badri Fuad	Released
30/6/2016	(Malaysia) Wafiq Wajdy	Released
30/6/2016	(Malaysia) Hasrul Nurkholis Hasim	Released
30/6/2016	(Malaysia) Shammin Izwan Abdullah	Released

== Malaysia FAM League ==
The 2016 Malaysia FAM League (referred to as the FAM League) is the 64th season of the FAM League since its establishment in 1952. The league is currently the third level football league in Malaysia. Malacca United S.A are the defending champions and currently play in the second level of Malaysian football, Malaysia Premier League.

The second transfer window started on 28 April until on 31 May 2016.

=== AirAsia F.C. ===
==== Transfers in ====
Date	Name	From
30 May 2016	(Malaysia) Muhd Rahmat Zainol	(Malaysia) Selangor U21
31 May 2016	(Malaysia) Azidan Sarudin	(Malaysia) Kuala Lumpur FA
31 May 2016	(Malaysia) K. Satish	(Malaysia) PKNS F.C. (Loan)

==== Transfers out ====
Date	Name	To
June 2016	(Malaysia) Reeshafiq Alwi	(Malaysia) Melaka United
	(Malaysia)	(Malaysia)
	(Malaysia)	(Malaysia)

=== D.Y.S F.C. ===
==== Transfers in ====
Date	Name	From
31 May 2016	(Malaysia) Shahrudin Yakup	Free Agents
	(Malaysia)	(Malaysia)

==== Transfers out ====
Entry date	Position	No	Player	From club	Fee

=== Felcra F.C. ===
==== Transfers in ====
Date	Name	From
May 2016	(Malaysia) Mohd Yatim Abdullah	Free Agents
May 2016	(Malaysia) Mohd Farhan Mustafa	Free Agents

==== Transfers out ====
Date	Name	To
20/6/2016	(Malaysia) Ibrahim Syaihul	(Malaysia) Kuala Lumpur FA
	(Malaysia)	(Malaysia)

=== Hanelang F.C. ===
==== Transfers in ====
Date	Name	From
May 2016	(Malaysia) Mohd Shairul Afiq Yahya	Free Agents
May 2016	(Malaysia) Mohd Aiman Fahmee Fauzi	Free Agents

==== Transfers out ====
Date	Name	To
1/7/2016	(Malaysia) Mohd Suhaimi Husin	(Malaysia) Terengganu FA
1/7/2016	(Malaysia) Mohd Hasrol Syawal Hamid	(Malaysia) Terengganu FA

=== KDM FC ===
==== Transfers in ====
Date	Name	From
14 May 2016	(Malaysia) Hardy Parsi	(Malaysia)
14 May 2016	(Malaysia) Melky Balang	(Malaysia)

==== Transfers out ====
Entry date	Position	No	Player	From club	Fee

=== Ipoh FA ===
==== Transfers in ====
Date	Name	From
May 2016	(Malaysia) Mohd Rosman Iskandar Dzulkernain	(Malaysia) Perak U21
May 2016	(Malaysia) S. Pandiaraj	Free Agents
May 2016	(Malaysia) G. Gobi	(Malaysia) MISC-MIFA

==== Transfers out ====
Date	Name	To
May 2016	(Malaysia) Muhd Shamirul Rani	(Malaysia) PBMM F.C.
	(Malaysia)	(Malaysia)
	(Malaysia)	

=== Malaysia Malays F.C. ===
==== Transfers in ====
Date	Name	From
May 2016	(Malaysia) Muhd Shamirul Rani	(Malaysia) Ipoh FA
May 2016	(Malaysia) Muhd Hafiz Jaafar	(Malaysia)
May 2016	(Malaysia) Nasrul Ramzan Abdul Rahaman	(Malaysia) Perak U21
May 2016	(Malaysia) Mohd Nizam Abdul Rahman	Free Agents
May 2016	(Malaysia) Faris Syazwan Mohamad	(Malaysia) Felda Utd U21
May 2016	(Malaysia) Amirrul Adli M. Yussli	Free Agents
May 2016	(Malaysia) Muhd Haikal Haziq Razali	Free Agents

==== Transfers out ====
Date	Name	From
May 2016	(Malaysia) Hasrol Nizam Muhamat	(Malaysia) Melaka United U21
June 2016	(Malaysia) Ibrahim Aziz	(Malaysia) DRB-Hicom F.C.
	(Malaysia)	(Malaysia)

=== Megah Murni F.C. ===
==== Transfers in ====
Date	Name	From
May 2016	(Malaysia) V. Ghopi	Free Agents
May 2016	(Malaysia) S. Kumar	Free Agents
May 2016	(Malaysia) Mohd Firdaus Yusof	Free Agents
May 2016	(Malaysia) Nur Adli Effandi	Free Agents
May 2016	(Malaysia) Mohd Norhafizzan Mohd Noor	Free Agents

==== Transfers out ====
Date	Name	To
May 2016	(Malaysia) S. Murali	Released
May 2016	(Malaysia) V. Sasikumar	Released
May 2016	(Malaysia) P. Paneerselvam	Released

=== MISC-MIFA ===
==== Transfers in ====
Date	Name	From
May 2016	(Malaysia) Muhd Hazwanuddin Abdul Halem	Free Agents
May 2016	(Malaysia) Mohd Zamri Ramli	Free Agents
May 2016	(Malaysia) M. Suthan	Free Agents

==== Transfers out ====
Date	Name	To
May 2016	(Malaysia) G. Gobi	(Malaysia) Ipoh FA
May 2016	(Malaysia) P. Haresh	(Malaysia) SAMB FC
July 2016	(Malaysia) Yosri Derma Raju	(Malaysia) UiTM F.C.

=== MOF F.C. ===
==== Transfers in ====
Date	Name	From
15 May 2016	(Malaysia) Tuan Muhd Faim	(Malaysia) Kelantan FA (Loan)
15 May 2016	(Malaysia) Rozaimi Azwar	(Malaysia) Kelantan FA (Loan)
20 May 2016	(Malaysia) Ezzat Mohamed Zin	(Malaysia) MPKB-BRI U-Bes F.C.
20 May 2016	(Malaysia) Wan Mohd Azwari Wan Nor	Free Agents
31 May 2016	(Malaysia) Rezal Zambery Yahya	Free Agents
1 June 2016	(Malaysia) Mohd Muhaimin Mohamad	(Malaysia) PKNS F.C.

==== Transfers out ====
Date	Name	To
16 May 2016	(Malaysia) Noor Azharuddin Musa	Released
18 May 2016	(Malaysia) Mohd Arman Zairi	Released

=== MPKB-BRI F.C. ===
==== Transfers in ====
Date	Name	From
12 May 2016	(Malaysia) Mohd Hazwani Abdul Karim	Free Agents
14 May 2016	(Malaysia) Muhd Ruziman Zakaria	Free Agents
16 May 2016	(Malaysia) Aliff Raziman Rahisam	Free Agents
16 May 2016	(Malaysia) Muhd Lokman Mat Salleh	Free Agents
16 May 2016	(Malaysia) Muhd Muzammel Madiran	Free Agents
16 May 2016	(Malaysia) Mohd Amri Fazal Mat Nor	Free Agents
31 May 2016	(Malaysia) Muhd Raim Azmi	Free Agents
31 May 2016	(Malaysia) Judtanna Eh Put	Free Agents

==== Transfers out ====
Date	Name	T0
May 2016	(Malaysia) Ezzat Mohammed Zin	(Malaysia) MOF F.C.
May 2016	(Malaysia) Muhd Shahruddin Ismail	Released
May 2016	(Malaysia) Muhammad Ikhwan Shamsuddin	Released
May 2016	(Malaysia) Mohd Sani Nawi	Released
May 2016	(Malaysia) Mohd Hafizi Awang	Released
May 2016	(Malaysia) Mohd Hafiz Mahadi	Released
May 2016	(Malaysia) Mohd Akram Hassan	Released

=== SAMB FC ===
==== Transfers in ====
Date	Name	From
May 2016	(Malaysia) P. Haresh	(Malaysia) MISC-MIFA
May 2016	(Malaysia) Mohd Syazwan Nordin	(Malaysia) Melaka United (Loan)
May 2016	(Malaysia) Ahmad Shahir Ismail	(Malaysia) Melaka United (Loan)

==== Transfers out ====
Date	Name	To
1 June 2016	(Malaysia) Ahmad Khuzaimie Piee	(Malaysia) PKNS F.C. (Loan Return)

=== Penjara F.C. ===
==== Transfers in ====
Date	Name	From
May 2016	(Malaysia) Mohd Hariz Nabihan Mohd Yusof	Free Agents
May 2016	(Malaysia) Al-Hafiz Alwi	Free Agents
May 2016	(Malaysia) Mohd Hakman Abdul Hadi	Free Agents
May 2016	(Malaysia) Wan Mohd Faiz Wan Sulaiman	Free Agents
May 2016	(Malaysia) S. Yogeswaran	Free Agents

==== Transfers out ====
Date	Name	To
May 2016	(Malaysia) Robson Rendy Rining	(Malaysia) Sabah FA
May 2016	(Malaysia) Abdul Hafeez Che Abdul Hamid	Released
May 2016	(Malaysia) Mohd Shazwan Mustaffa	Released
May 2016	(Malaysia) Razrin Hamidi Abdul Razak	Released
May 2016	(Malaysia) Mohd Syazwan Abdul Majid	Released
May 2016	(Malaysia) Muhd Shahrul Nizam Anuar	Released

=== PKNP F.C. ===
==== Transfers in ====
Date	Name	From
May 2016	(Malaysia) Muhd Saiful Rizal Termize	(Malaysia) Batang Padang PKNP
May 2016	(Malaysia) Ahmad Azraei Omar	(Malaysia) Batang Padang PKNP
May 2015	(Malaysia) Francis Martin	Free Agents
May 2016	(Malaysia) Syed Mohd Ridzuan Syed Bakri	Free Agents

==== Transfers out ====
Date	Player	From club
May 2016	(Malaysia) Muhd Mazni Khairul Hasnan	Released

=== Sungai Ara F.C. ===
==== Transfers in ====
Date	Name	From
May 2016	(Malaysia)	(Malaysia)
	(Malaysia)	(Malaysia)
	(Malaysia)	(Malaysia)

==== Transfers out ====
Date	Name	To
May 2016	(Malaysia) Muhammad Firas Asyraaf bin Zahrul Nizam	(Malaysia) Penang U21
May 2016	(Malaysia) Muhammad Asyraaf Mat Pushni	(Malaysia) Penang U21
May 2016	(Malaysia) Ku Mohd Anuar Ku Mohd Roshidi	(Malaysia) Penang U21

=== UKM F.C. ===
==== Transfers in ====
Date	Name	From
30 May 2016	(Malaysia) Al-Amin Abdullah	Free Agents
30 May 2016	(Malaysia) Muhd Ridzuan Kamis	Free Agents
30 May 2016	(Malaysia) Mohd Hafizulldin Mohd Noor	Free Agents

==== Transfers out ====
Date	Name	To
May 2016	(Malaysia) Muhamad Izzuddin Razali	Released
May 2016	(Malaysia) Mohamad Adlil Adhha Mazlan	Released
May 2016	(Malaysia) Muhd Azrul Amin Mohd Zain	Released

=== Shahzan Muda F.C. ===
==== Transfers in ====
Pos.	Name	From
	(Malaysia)	(Malaysia)

==== Transfers out ====
Pos.	Name	To
	(Malaysia)	(Malaysia)
	(Malaysia)	(Malaysia)
	(Malaysia)	(Malaysia)

== See also ==
- 2016 Malaysia Super League
- 2016 Malaysia Premier League
- 2016 Malaysia FAM League
- 2016 Malaysia FA Cup
- 2016 Malaysia Cup
- 2016 Malaysia President's Cup
- 2016 Malaysia Youth League
- List of Malaysian football transfers 2016
