= 2016 Melaka United season =

Melaka United
2016 season
- President: Datuk Seri Ir. Idris Haron
- Head coach: Mat Zan Mat Aris
- Stadium: Hang Jebat Stadium (capacity:40,000)
- Premier League: Champions
- FA Cup: Second Round
- Malaysia Cup: Group stage
- Top goalscorer: League: Ilija Spasojevic (24); All: Ilija Spasojevic (27)
- Highest home attendance: 35,000 vs Sime Darby (22 October 2016)
- Lowest home attendance: 4,000 vs DRB-HICOM (22 July 2016)
Home colours	Away colours	Third colours

The 2016 Melaka United season was 93rd season in club history and 1st season in the Malaysia Premier League since relegated of the league in 2010 season.

== Background ==
=== Background information ===
Melaka United won their first consecutive Malaysia FAM League championship in the 2015 season and promote to Malaysia Premier League in the 2016 season. Melaka United were knocked out of the 2015 Malaysia FA Cup in the first round by Terengganu.

Melaka United is preparing big budget for this season in order to achieve better position.

=== Transfer ===
Melaka United announced an addition of three import players to strengthen the squad. The players are Labinot Harbuzi from Sweden, Shin Jae Pil from South Korea and Ilija Spasojević from Montenegro. 14 local players transferred to Melaka United.

== Management team ==
=== Club personnel ===
Position	Name
President	(Malaysia) Datuk Seri Ir. Idris Haron
General Manager	(Malaysia) Datuk Wira Mohd Yusoff Hj Mahadi
Assistant manager	(Malaysia) Mohd Nor Derus
Head coach	(Malaysia) Mat Zan Mat Aris
Assistant coach	(Malaysia) Norizam Ali Hassan
Goalkeeper coach	(Malaysia) Mazlan Abdul Wahid
Physio	(Malaysia) Muhd Rozairen Hairudin
U21 Manager	(Malaysia) Khairi Anuar Ahmad
U21 Assistant Manager	(Malaysia) Tan Ching Yang
U21 Head Coach	(Malaysia) G. Torairaju
U21 Assistant Coach	(Malaysia) Sapian Abdul Wahid
U21 Fitness Coach	(Malaysia) Syahrul Nizam Shamsudin
U21 Goalkeeper Coach	(Malaysia) S. Rosli Hashim
U21 Physio	(Malaysia) Fakhrusy Syakirin Yaacob
U19 General Manager	(Malaysia) Shamsuddin Hassan
U19 Head Coach	(Malaysia) G. Selvamohan
U19 Assistant Coach	(Malaysia) Rashid Mahmud
U19 Coach	(Malaysia) Azni Ariffin
U19 Goalkeeper Coach	(Malaysia) Zulkarnain Osman
U19 Fitness Coach	(Malaysia) Mohd Fauzzi Kassim
U19 Physio	(Malaysia) Zainal Jalil

== Kit ==
- Supplier: Kronos
- Main sponsors: Edra & Mamee
- Other sponsors: Restoran Melayu, Hatten Groups

Home
Away
Third
Goalkeeper

== Squads ==
=== First-team squad ===
As of 28 June 2016

No.	Name	Nat.	Position(s)	Join	Date of birth (age)	Signed from	Notes
Goalkeeper
1	Ahmad Solehin Mamat	(Malaysia)	GK	2015	24 March 1996 (aged 19)	Harimau Muda B	
29	Muhammad Syazwan Yusoff	(Malaysia)	GK	2016	17 April 1992 (aged 23)	Kelantan	On Loan
52	Mohd Fadzley Rahim	(Malaysia)	GK	2016	22 July 1987 (aged 28)	Sabah FA	
Defenders
4	Mohd Alif Shamsudin	(Malaysia)	RB / RWB	2015	1 February 1986 (aged 29)	Sime Darby	
5	Mohammad Abdul Aziz Ismail	(Malaysia)	LB / LWB	2016	7 August 1988 (aged 27)	Pahang	
11	Fiqri Azwan Ghazali	(Malaysia)	LB / LWB	2015	20 March 1992 (aged 23)	Putrajaya SPA	
18	Muhd Syawal Norsam	(Malaysia)	CB	2016	29 May 1989 (aged 26)	Pahang	
20	Wan Amirul Afiq Wan Abdul Rahman	(Malaysia)	RB / RWB	2016	18 July 1992 (aged 23)	Young Fighters	
55	Alexandru Tudose	(Romania)	CB / RB	2016	3 April 1987 (aged 29)	Free agent	
56	Ahmad Khuzaimie Piee	(Malaysia)	CB / LB / DM	2016	11 November 1993 (aged 22)	PKNS	On Loan
Midfielders
7	Surendran Ravindran	(Malaysia)	RM / LM	2016	17 May 1987 (aged 28)	Pahang	
8	Mohd Hazri Rozali	(Malaysia)	DM / CM	2016	26 June 1986 (aged 29)	Pahang	
10	Labinot Harbuzi	(Sweden) (Kosovo)	AM / CM	2016	4 April 1986 (aged 29)	Free agent	
12	R. Barath Kumar	(Malaysia)	LM	2016	23 April 1991 (aged 24)	Young Fighters	
13	See Kok Luen	(Malaysia)	CM	2016	3 June 1988 (aged 27)	Penang	
16	Mohd Iskandar Hanapiah	(Malaysia)	RM / LM	2015	2 June 1993 (aged 22)	Harimau Muda B	
17	G. Puaneswaran	(Malaysia)	RM / LM	2016	27 May 1983 (aged 32)	Negeri Sembilan	
23	Jasmir Mehat	(Malaysia)	LM / AM	2015	6 February 1994 (aged 21)	Youth system	
26	Khair Jones	(Malaysia) (New Zealand)	LM / CB / LB / LWB / RB	2016	29 September 1989 (aged 26)	Hawke's Bay United FC	
57	Mohd Saiful Mustafa	(Malaysia)	CM / AM	2016	24 June 1987 (aged 29)	Free agent	
58	Reeshafiq Alwi	(Malaysia)	DM / CM	2016	12 December 1982 (aged 33)	AirAsia Allstar	
59	Ahmad Ezrie Shafizie	(Malaysia)	CM / DM	2016	24 February 1986 (aged 30)	FELDA United	On Loan
60	Mohd Ferris Danial	(Malaysia)	LM / ST / CF / AM	2016	21 August 1992 (aged 23)	FELDA United	On Loan
Forwards
9	Ilija Spasojević	(Montenegro) (Indonesia)	ST / CF	2016	11 September 1987 (aged 28)	Persib Bandung	Captain
19	Nurshamil Abd Ghani	(Malaysia)	ST / CF / AM	2015	25 September 1994 (aged 21)	Harimau Muda B	
51	Yashir Pinto	(Palestine) (Chile)	ST / CF	2016	6 February 1991 (aged 25)	Curicó Unido	

=== Reserve squad ===
No.	Name	Nat.	Position(s)	Join	Date of birth (age)	Signed from	Notes
3	Mohamad Faiz Suhaimi	(Malaysia)	CB	2015	13 March 1993 (aged 22)	Kelantan	Injury
6	Rusmanizam Roseland	(Malaysia)	CB	2016	11 October 1993 (aged 22)	Sabah Youth system	Injury

=== Out on loan ===
No.	Name	Nat.	Position(s)	Join	Date of birth (age)	Signed from	Notes
15	Ahmad Shahir Ismail	(Malaysia)	CB	2016	22 July 1987 (aged 28)	DRB-HICOM	Loan to SAMB FC
30	Mohd Syazwan Nordin	(Malaysia)	ST / CF	2016	15 April 1993 (aged 22)	UiTM Perlis	Loan to SAMB FC

== Friendly matches ==
Win Draw Loss

21 November 2015 Friendly	Melaka United (Malacca)	2–3	(Selangor) PKNS	Krubong, Malacca
20:45 (UTC+8)				Stadium: Hang Jebat Stadium

28 November 2015 Friendly	Melaka United (Malacca)	2–1	(Kuala Lumpur) DRB-HICOM	Krubong, Malacca
16:45 (UTC+8)				Stadium: Hang Jebat Stadium

12 December 2015 Friendly	UiTM (Selangor)	1–3	(Malacca) Melaka United	Shah Alam, Selangor
18:00 (UTC+8)				Stadium: UiTM Stadium

17 December 2015 Friendly	Hồ Chí Minh City (Vietnam)	2–0	(Malaysia) Melaka United	Ho Chi Minh City, Vietnam
17:00 (UTC+7)				Stadium: Thống Nhất Stadium

19 December 2015 Friendly	Đồng Tâm Long An (Vietnam)	4–0	(Malaysia) Melaka United	Tân An, Vietnam
15:00 (UTC+7)

1 January 2016 Friendly	Melaka United (Malacca)	1–0	(Selangor) AirAsia Allstar	Malacca City, Malacca
20:45 (UTC+8)				Stadium: Hang Tuah Stadium

16 January 2016 Friendly	Kuantan (Pahang)	1–4	(Malacca) Melaka United	Pekan, Pahang
16:45 (UTC+8				Stadium: Pekan Football Field

23 January 2016 Friendly	Melaka United (Malacca)	4–1	(Kuala Lumpur) Sime Darby	Krubong, Malacca
20:45 (UTC+8)	Spasojević 23', 41'; Božović 31', 56'		Faiz 13'	Stadium: Hang Jebat Stadium

29 January 2016 Friendly	Melaka United (Malacca)	2–2	(Malaysia) PDRM	Krubong, Malacca
21:40 (UTC+8)	Spasojević 36'; Iskandar 90'			Stadium: Hang Jebat Stadium

5 February 2016 Friendly	Melaka United (Malacca)	3–1	(Negeri Sembilan) Penjara	Malacca City, Malacca
20:45 (UTC+8)	Puaneswaran 14'; See 39'; Spasojević 43'		Penjara No.11 80'	Stadium: Hang Tuah Stadium

18 June 2016 Friendly	Selangor	2–2	(Malacca) Melaka United	Shah Alam, Selangor
22:15 (UTC+8)				Stadium: Shah Alam Stadium

25 June 2016 Friendly	Melaka United (Malacca)	3–2	(Malaysia) ATM	Krubong, Malacca
22:00 (UTC+8)				Stadium: Hang Jebat Stadium

2 July 2016 Friendly	Melaka United (Malacca)	2–1	Pahang	Krubong, Malacca
22:00 (UTC+8)				Stadium: Hang Jebat Stadium

14 October 2016 Friendly	Melaka United (Malacca)	1–3	(Malaysia) ATM	Durian Tunggal, Malacca
16:00 (UTC+8)				Stadium: UteM Stadium

== Competitions ==
=== Overall ===
Competition	Started round	Current position / round	Final position / round	First match	Last match
Premier League	Matchday 1	—	Winners	12 February 2016	22 October 2016
FA Cup	Second round	—	Second round	20 February 2016	20 February 2016
Malaysia Cup	Group stage	—	Group stage	12 July 2016	19 August 2016

Updated to match played 25 July 2016
Source: Competitions

=== Overview ===
Competition	Record							
Competition	Pld	W	D	L	GF	GA	GD	Win %
Premier League	22	15	5	2	48	25	+23	68.18
FA Cup	1	0	1	0	1	1	+0	0.00
Malaysia Cup	6	3	0	3	9	7	+2	50.00
Total	29	18	6	5	58	33	+25	62.07

Source: Competitions

=== Malaysia Premier League ===
==== Table ====
Pos	Team	Pld	W	D	L	GF	GA	GD	Pts	Promotion or relegation
1	Melaka United (C, P)	22	15	5	2	48	25	+23	50	Promotion to Super League
2	PKNS (P)	22	15	3	4	49	25	+24	48	Promotion to Super League
3	Johor Darul Ta'zim II	22	13	4	5	44	26	+18	43	
4	Negeri Sembilan	22	9	8	5	40	26	+14	35	
5	Kuala Lumpur	22	9	8	5	38	32	+6	35	

Source: FAM Official Site, Football Malaysia LLP
Rules for classification: 1) Points; 2) Goal difference; 3) Number of goals scored; 4) Number of goals against
(C) Champions; (P) Promoted

==== Results summary ====
Overall								Home						Away					
Pld	W	D	L	GF	GA	GD	Pts	W	D	L	GF	GA	GD	W	D	L	GF	GA	GD
21	15	4	2	47	24	+23	49	8	2	0	22	8	+14	7	2	2	25	16	+9

Source: Premier League fixtures and results

==== Results by round ====
Round	1	2	3	4	5	6	7	8	9	10	11	12	13	14	15	16	17	18	19	20	21	22
Ground	A	H	A	H	A	H	H	A	H	A	A	H	A	H	A	H	A	H	A	H	A	H
Result	D	W	W	D	D	W	W	W	W	L	W	W	W	W	W	W	W	W	W	D	L	D
Position	6	6	2	3	5	3	3	1	1	2	1	1	1	1	1	1	1	1	1	1	1	1

Source: Premier League fixtures and results
A = Away; H = Home; W = Win; D = Draw; L = Loss

==== Malaysia Premier League fixtures and results ====
Win Draw Loss

12 February 2016 1	Sime Darby (Kuala Lumpur)	2–2	(Malacca) Melaka United	Selayang, Selangor
21:00 (UTC+8)	Pooda 3', 24'		18' Božović; 90+2' Nurshamil	Stadium: Selayang Stadium

15 February 2016 2	Melaka United (Malacca)	2–1	(Selangor) PKNS	Krubong, Malacca
21:00 (UTC+8)	Surendran 15'; Nurshamil 85'	https://www.pengurusanbolasepakfam.org.my/livescore/index_premier2016?game_no=328 Report	50' Juan Manuel Cobelli	Stadium: Hang Jebat Stadium; Attendance: 13,000; Referee: Mohd Fairus Zulkeflee

26 February 2016 3	Johor Darul Ta'zim II	1–2	(Malacca) Melaka United	Pasir Gudang, Johor
21:00 (UTC+8)	Paulo Rangel 17'		30' Balša; 86' Wan Amirul Afiq	Stadium: Pasir Gudang Stadium

1 March 2016 4	Melaka United (Malacca)	0–0	Negeri Sembilan	Krubong, Malacca
21:00 (UTC+8)		https://www.pengurusanbolasepakfam.org.m/livescore/index_premier2016?game_no=345 Report		Stadium: Hang Jebat Stadium; Attendance: 17,000; Referee: Razlan Jeffri Ali

11 March 2016 5	Sabah	2–2	(Malacca) Melaka United	Kota Kinabalu, Sabah
20:15 (UTC+8)	Cerina 50'; Leopold 58'	https://www.pengurusanbolasepakfam.org.my/livescore/index_premier2016?game_no=351 Report	See 42'; Božović 71'	Stadium: Likas Stadium; Attendance: 2,700; Referee: Zulkifli Ahmad

5 April 2016 6	Melaka United (Malacca)	3–1	(Selangor) UiTM	Krubong, Malacca
21:00 (UTC+8)	Spasojević 2', 53' (yellow card) 43'; Labi 46' (yellow card) 74'	https://www.pengurusanbolasepakfam.org.my/livescore/index_premier2016?game_no=358 Report	Guardiano 1'; Aliffikhwan (yellow card) 20'; Mohd Adib Zainuddin (yellow card) 32'	Stadium: Hang Jebat Stadium; Attendance: 4,600; Referee: Ahmad Fareez Mat Suburi

8 April 2016 7	Melaka United (Malacca)	3–2	(Pahang) Kuantan	Krubong, Malacca
21:00 (UTC+8)	Spasojević 9', 57'; Nurshamil 88'; Božović (yellow card) 90+2'	https://www.pengurusanbolasepakfam.org.my/livescore/index_premier2016?game_no=360 Report	Wafiy (yellow card) 14'; Baranin (yellow card) 45+1'; Bakary 51'; Vidaković (yellow card) 70'; Malik 84'	Stadium: Hang Jebat Stadium; Attendance: 6,500; Referee: Ahmad Tajuddin Mohd Yusoff

19 April 2016 8	DRB-HICOM (Kuala Lumpur)	0–1	(Malacca) Melaka United	Tanjung Malim, Perak
16:45 (UTC+8)		https://www.pengurusanbolasepakfam.org.my/livescore/index_premier2016?game_no=365 Report	Spasojević 89' (pen.)	Stadium: Proton City Stadium; Attendance: 900; Referee: Khirul Azuan Kidam

22 April 2016 9	Melaka United (Malacca)	2–1	Kuala Lumpur	Krubong, Malacca
21:00 (UTC+8)	Fiqri (yellow card) 11'; Spasojević 28'; Jasmir 31'; Syazwan (yellow card) 88'	https://www.pengurusanbolasepakfam.org.my/livescore/index_premier2016?game_no=375 Report	Casagrande 1'; Fahrul (yellow card) 84'	Stadium: Hang Jebat Stadium; Attendance: 11,000; Referee: Suresh Jayaraman

3 May 2016 10	Perlis	2–1	(Malacca) Melaka United	Kangar, Perlis
16:45 (UTC+8)	Sadam (yellow card) 51'; Vincent 88' (pen.); Wilson 90'	Report	Surendran 2'; Syazwan (yellow card) 70'; Jae-pil (yellow card) 87'; Božović (yellow card) 87'; Labi (yellow card) 88'	Stadium: Tuanku Syed Putra Stadium; Attendance: 932; Referee: Suhaimi Mat Hassan

17 May 2016 11	ATM (Malaysia)	0–6	(Malacca) Melaka United	Temerloh, Pahang
16:45 (UTC+8)	Azim (yellow card) 90'	Report	Labi 2'; Puaneswaran 16'; Spasojević 20', 38', 45', 90+2'	Stadium: Temerloh Mini Stadium; Attendance: 505; Referee: Saiful Mohd Rodzali

21 May 2016 12	Melaka United (Malacca)	3–1	(Malaysia) ATM	Krubong, Malacca
21:00 (UTC+8)	Spasojević 9', 18', 23'; Surendran (yellow card) 60'; Puaneswaran (yellow card) 82'	https://www.pengurusanbolasepakfam.org.my/livescore/index_premier2016?game_no=394 Report	Faiz (yellow card) 27'; Jae-pil 57' (o.g.)	Stadium: Hang Jebat Stadium; Attendance: 8,960; Referee: Khairulazuan Kidam

16 July 2016 14	Kuala Lumpur	1–2	(Malacca) Melaka United	Selayang, Selangor
21:00 (UTC+8)	Irfan (yellow card) 51'; Inostroza (yellow card) 65'; Moreira 80'; Helmi (yellow card) 84'; Thamil (yellow card) 90+2'	https://www.pengurusanbolasepakfam.org.my/livescore/index_premier2016?game_no=401 Report	Spasojević 43', 56'; Solehin (yellow card) 61'; Labi (yellow card) 90+2'	Stadium: Selayang Stadium; Attendance: 2,000; Referee: Tiong Eng Tai

22 July 2016 15	Melaka United (Malacca)	2–0	(Kuala Lumpur) DRB-HICOM	Krubong, Malacca
21:00 (UTC+8)	Spasojević 26'; Pinto 78'	https://www.pengurusanbolasepakfam.org.my/livescore/index_premier2016?game_no=405 Report	Nasrullah (yellow card) 66'	Stadium: Hang Jebat Stadium; Attendance: 4,000; Referee: Muhammad Nasruddin Tamrin

25 July 2016 16	Kuantan (Pahang)	3–4	(Malacca) Melaka United	Kuantan, Pahang
21:00 (UTC+8)	Shazalee 2', 38'; Bakary 31'	https://www.pengurusanbolasepakfam.org.my/livescore/index_premier2016?game_no=411 Report	Spasojević 28'; Alex 35', 90+1'; Pinto 47'	Stadium: Darul Makmur Stadium; Attendance: 500; Referee: Mohd Ezanee Mohd Said

2 August 2016 13	Melaka United (Malacca)	3–1	Perlis	Krubong, Malacca
21:00 (UTC+8)	Spasojević 19', 41'; Pinto 53'	Report	Alafi 17'	Stadium: Hang Jebat Stadium; Attendance: 6,000; Referee: Khairulazuan Kidam

5 August 2016 17	UiTM (Selangor)	2–3	(Malacca) Melaka United	Shah Alam, Selangor
16:45 (UTC+8)	John Matkin 4'; Nik Syafiq Syazwan 49'	Report	Spasojević 13', 56', 75'	Stadium: UiTM Stadium; Attendance: 290; Referee: Mohd Ridhwan Abdul Rahman

16 August 2016 18	Melaka United (Malacca)	3–0	Sabah	Krubong, Malacca
21:00 (UTC+8)	Spasojević 38'; R. Surendran 54', 59'	Report		Stadium: Hang Jebat Stadium; Attendance: 5,227; Referee: Samsudin Ibrahim

23 August 2016 19	Negeri Sembilan	0–1	(Malacca) Melaka United	Paroi, Negeri Sembilan
21:00 (UTC+8)		Report	R. Surendran 80'	Stadium: Tuanku Abdul Rahman Stadium; Attendance: 3,693; Referee: Tiong Eng Lai

26 August 2016 20	Melaka United (Malacca)	1–1	Johor Darul Ta'zim II	Krubong, Malacca
21:00 (UTC+8)				Stadium: Hang Jebat Stadium

23 September 2016 21	PKNS (Selangor)	3–1	(Malacca) Melaka United	Shah Alam, Selangor
21:00 (UTC+8)				Stadium: Shah Alam Stadium

21 October 2016 22	Melaka United (Malacca)	1–1	(Kuala Lumpur) Sime Darby	Krubong, Malacca
21:00 (UTC+8)	Saiful 89'			Stadium: Hang Jebat Stadium; Attendance: 35,000

==== Results overview ====
Win Draw Loss

Team	Home score	Away score	Double
(Malaysia) ATM	3–1	0–6	Yes
(Kuala Lumpur) DRB-HICOM	2–0	0–1	Yes
Johor Darul Ta'zim II	1–1	1–2	No
Kuala Lumpur	2–1	1–2	Yes
(Pahang) Kuantan	3–2	3–4	Yes
Negeri Sembilan	0–0	0–1	No
Perlis	3–1	2–1	No
(Selangor) PKNS	2–1	3–1	No
Sabah	3–0	2–2	No
(Kuala Lumpur) Sime Darby	1–1	2–2	No
(Selangor) UiTM	3–1	2–3	Yes

=== Scoring ===
==== Top scorers in 2016 Malaysia Premier League ====
Rank	Player	Goals	Apps
1	Ilija Spasojević	24	22
2	Nurshamil Abd Ghani	3	11
3	Labinot Harbuzi	2	8
3	Surendran Ravindran	2	13
5	G. Puaneswaran	1	10
5	Jasmir Mehat	1	10
5	See Kok Luen	1	12
5	Wan Amirul Afiq	1	13

=== Malaysia FA Cup ===
Win Draw Loss

20 February 2016 2nd Round	Kuala Lumpur	1–1 (a.e.t.) (4–2 p)	(Malacca) Melaka United	Selayang, Selangor
21:00 (UTC+8)	Casagrande	Report	Jasmir Mehat	Stadium: Selayang Stadium; Attendance: 2,000; Referee: Tiong Eng Tai
	Penalties
	(penalty scored) Moreira; (penalty scored) Thamil Arasu; (penalty scored) Hafiz Johari; (penalty scored) Azlan		(penalty scored) Balša; (penalty missed) Nurshamil; (penalty missed) S Jae-Pil; (penalty scored) Azwan

=== Malaysia Cup ===
==== Group stage ====
Pos	Team	Pld	W	D	L	GF	GA	GD	Pts	Qualification
1	(Kuala Lumpur) FELDA United	6	4	0	2	9	5	+4	12	Advance to Quarter-finals
2	Negeri Sembilan	6	4	0	2	9	8	+1	12	Advance to Quarter-finals
3	Malacca United	6	3	0	3	9	7	+2	9	
4	Terengganu	6	1	0	5	3	10	−7	3	

Updated to match(es) played on 19 August 2016. Source: FAM FMLLP

Win Draw Loss

12 July 2016	Melaka United (Malacca)	2–1	Terengganu	Krubong, Malacca
21:00 UTC+8	Spasojević 54' (pen.); Surendran 58'	Report	Milic 74'	Stadium: Hang Jebat Stadium; Attendance: 9,000; Referee: Mohd Nafeez Abdul Wahab

19 July 2016	Negeri Sembilan	3–2	(Malacca) Melaka United	Paroi, Negeri Sembilan
21:00 UTC+8				Stadium: Tuanku Abdul Rahman Stadium

29 July 2016	Melaka United (Malacca)	0–1	(Kuala Lumpur) FELDA United	Krubong, Malacca
21:00 UTC+8				Stadium: Hang Jebat Stadium

9 August 2016	FELDA United (Kuala Lumpur)	2–1	(Malacca) Melaka United	Jengka, Pahang
21:00 UTC+8				Stadium: Tun Abdul Razak Stadium

12 August 2016	Melaka United (Malacca)	2–0	Negeri Sembilan	Krubong, Malacca
21:00 UTC+8				Stadium: Hang Jebat Stadium

19 August 2016	Terengganu	0–2	(Malacca) Melaka United	Kuala Nerus, Terengganu
21:00 UTC+8				Stadium: Sultan Mizan Zainal Abidin Stadium

=== Scoring ===
==== Top scorers in 2016 Malaysia Cup ====
Rank	Player	Goals	Apps

== Squad statistics ==
=== Appearances and goals ===
No.	Pos	Nat	Player	Total		League		FA Cup		Malaysia Cup	
No.	Pos	Nat	Player	Apps	Goals	Apps	Goals	Apps	Goals	Apps	Goals
Goalkeepers
1	GK	(Malaysia) MAS	Ahmad Solehin Mamat	15	0	8	0	1	0	6	0
29	GK	(Malaysia) MAS	Muhammad Syazwan Yusoff	14	0	13	0	0	0	0+1	0
52	GK	(Malaysia) MAS	Mohd Fadzley Rahim	1	0	1	0	0	0	0	0
Defenders
4	DF	(Malaysia) MAS	Mohd Alif Shamsudin	3	0	2	0	1	0	0	0
5	DF	(Malaysia) MAS	Mohammad Abdul Aziz Ismail	14	0	5+3	0	1	0	5	0
11	DF	(Malaysia) MAS	Fiqri Azwan Ghazali	11	0	9+1	0	0+1	0	0	0
18	DF	(Malaysia) MAS	Muhd Syawal Norsam	12	0	7+3	0	1	0	1	0
20	DF	(Malaysia) MAS	Wan Amirul Afiq Wan Abdul Rahman	22	1	14+1	1	1	0	4+2	0
55	DF	(Romania) ROU	Alexandru Tudose	9	2	5	2	0	0	4	0
56	DF	(Malaysia) MAS	Ahmad Khuzaimie Piee	11	0	4+1	0	0	0	5+1	0
Midfielders
7	MF	(Malaysia) MAS	Surendran Ravindran	27	6	18+2	5	1	0	6	1
8	MF	(Malaysia) MAS	Mohd Hazri Rozali	9	0	2+5	0	1	0	0+1	0
10	MF	(Sweden) SWE	Labinot Harbuzi	16	2	11	2	0	0	5	0
12	MF	(Malaysia) MAS	R. Barath Kumar	0	0	0	0	0	0	0	0
13	MF	(Malaysia) MAS	See Kok Luen	15	0	11+2	0	1	0	1	0
16	MF	(Malaysia) MAS	Mohd Iskandar Hanapiah	17	0	8+6	0	1	0	1+1	0
17	MF	(Malaysia) MAS	G. Puaneswaran	18	1	8+6	1	0	0	3+1	0
23	MF	(Malaysia) MAS	Jasmir Mehat	19	2	6+7	1	0+1	1	2+3	0
26	MF	(Malaysia) MAS	Khair Jones	17	0	14	0	0	0	3	0
57	MF	(Malaysia) MAS	Mohd Saiful Mustafa	6	2	1+3	1	0	0	1+1	1
58	MF	(Malaysia) MAS	Reeshafiq Alwi	3	0	1	0	0	0	0+2	0
59	MF	(Malaysia) MAS	Ahmad Ezrie Shafizie	10	1	5	0	0	0	5	1
60	MF	(Malaysia) MAS	Mohd Ferris Danial	8	1	4	0	0	0	3+1	1
Forwards
9	FW	(Montenegro) MNE	Ilija Spasojević	24	27	20	24	1	0	3	3
19	FW	(Malaysia) MAS	Nurshamil Abd Ghani	17	4	3+9	3	0+1	0	3+1	1
51	FW	(Palestine) PLE	Yashir Pinto	9	4	5	3	0	0	4	1
Players transferred out during the season
3	DF	(Malaysia) MAS	Mohamad Faiz Suhaimi	0	0	0	0	0	0	0	0
6	DF	(Malaysia) MAS	Rusmanizam Roseland	1	0	0+1	0	0	0	0	0
14	DF	(South Korea) KOR	Shin Jae-pil	13	0	12	0	1	0	0	0
15	DF	(Malaysia) MAS	Ahmad Shahir Ismail	0	0	0	0	0	0	0	0
24	MF	(Montenegro) MNE	Balša Božović	11	3	10	3	1	0	0	0
25	GK	(Malaysia) MAS	Stefan Petrovski	0	0	0	0	0	0	0	0
27	MF	(Malaysia) MAS	V. Kavi Chelvan	1	0	0+1	0	0	0	0	0
30	FW	(Malaysia) MAS	Mohd Syazwan Nordin	0	0	0	0	0	0	0	0

Last updated: 16 July 2016
Source: Competitions / SPMB

=== Goalkeeper statistics ===
Rank	No.	Pos	Nat	Name	League	FA Cup	Malaysia Cup	Total
2	1	GK	(Malaysia)	Ahmad Solehin Mamat	3	0	2	5
1	29	GK	(Malaysia)	Muhammad Syazwan Yusoff	3	0	0	3
Totals					6	0	2	8

Last updated: 21 May 2016

=== Discipline ===
==== Cards ====
Rnk	No.	Player	League		FA Cup		Malaysia Cup		Total	
Rnk	No.	Player	Yellow card	Red card	Yellow card	Red card	Yellow card	Red card	Yellow card	Red card
1	4	(Malaysia) Mohd Alif Shamsudin	3	1	0	0	0	0	3	1
1	10	(Sweden) Labinot Harbuzi	3	0	0	0	1	0	3	0
3	9	(Montenegro) Ilija Spasojević	3	0	0	0	0	0	3	0
4	29	(Malaysia) Muhammad Syazwan Yusoff	2	0	0	0	0	0	2	0
4	18	(Malaysia) Muhd Syawal Norsam	2	0	0	0	0	0	2	0
4	17	(Malaysia) G. Puaneswaran	2	0	0	0	0	0	2	0
4	24	(Montenegro) Balša Božović	2	0	0	0	0	0	2	0
8	14	(South Korea) Shin Jae-pil	1	0	0	0	0	0	1	0
8	11	(Malaysia) Fiqri Azwan Ghazali	1	0	0	0	0	0	1	0
8	7	(Malaysia) Surendran Ravindran	1	0	0	0	0	0	1	0
8	1	(Malaysia) Ahmad Solehin Mamat	1	0	0	0	0	0	1	0
Totals			21	1	0	0	1	0	22	1

== Transfers ==
=== Early season ===
==== In ====
Pos.	Name	From
	(Montenegro) Ilija Spasojevic	(Indonesia) Persib Bandung
	(South Korea) Shin Jae-pil	(Laos) Ezra F.C.
	(Montenegro) Balša Božović	(Montenegro) OFK Petrovac
	(Sweden) Labinot Harbuzi	Free agent
	(Australia) (Malaysia) Stefan Petrovski	(Australia) Sydney Olympic FC
	(Malaysia) Ahmad Shahir Ismail	(Malaysia) DRB-Hicom F.C.
	(Malaysia) Muhammad Syazwan Yusoff	(Malaysia) Kelantan FA
	(Malaysia) G. Puaneswaran	(Malaysia) Negeri Sembilan FA
	(Malaysia) V. Kavi Chelvan	(Malaysia) Negeri Sembilan FA
	(Malaysia) Mohammad Abdul Aziz Ismail	(Malaysia) Pahang F.C.
	(Malaysia) Mohd Hazri Rozali	(Malaysia) Pahang F.C.
	(Malaysia) Muhammad Syawal Norsam	(Malaysia) Pahang F.C.
	(Malaysia) R. Surendran	(Malaysia) Pahang F.C.
	(Malaysia) See Kok Luen	(Malaysia) Penang FA
	(Malaysia) Hardy Charles Parsi	(Malaysia) Sabah FA
	(Malaysia) R. Barath Kumar	(Malaysia) Young Fighters F.C.
	(Malaysia) Wan Amirul Afiq Wan Abdul Rahman	(Malaysia) Young Fighters F.C.
	(Malaysia) Mohd Mursyidin Maudoode	(Malaysia) Felda United F.C. U21
	(Malaysia) Mohd Alif Shamsudin	(Malaysia) Sime Darby F.C.
	(New Zealand) (Malaysia) Khair Jones	(New Zealand) Hawke's Bay United FC

==== Out ====
Pos.	Name	To
GK	(Malaysia) Izzat Abdul Rahim	(Malaysia) AirAsia Allstar
GK	(Malaysia) Muhd Hafizul Hakim Khairul Nizam	(Malaysia) Perak
DF	(Malaysia) Billy Doliente	(Malaysia) DYS
DF	(Malaysia) Rahmat Naemat	(Malaysia) SAMB
DF	(Malaysia) Muhd Sabri Adam	(Malaysia) SAMB
DF	(Malaysia) Mohd Afiq Azuan	(Malaysia) Melaka United President's Cup
DF	(Malaysia) Syafiq Azri Ahmad Kamal	(Malaysia) MOF
DF	(Malaysia) Mohd Ahzuan Khan	(Malaysia) DYS
DF	(Malaysia) Alif Najmi Zaini	(Malaysia) Melaka United President's Cup
DF	(Malaysia) Abdul Thaufiq Abdul Haq	(Malaysia) AirAsia Allstar
MF	(Malaysia) Rexjeson Pitrus	(Malaysia) Sabah
MF	(Malaysia) Mohd Azizan Baba	(Malaysia) SAMB
MF	(Malaysia) Mohd Aliff Mazlan	(Malaysia) Melaka United President's Cup
MF	(Malaysia) Muhd Hafizan Talib	(Malaysia) Hanelang
MF	(Malaysia) Famirul Asyraf Sayuti	(Malaysia) Perlis
MF	(Malaysia) Mohd Zahari Zubir	
MF	(Malaysia) Muhammad Zahiruddin Zulkifli	(Malaysia) PKNP
MF	(Malaysia) Mohammad Asif Mohd Azman	(Malaysia) MOF
MF	(Malaysia) Reeshafiq Alwi	(Malaysia) AirAsia Allstar
FW	(Malaysia) Mohd Zaidi Zubir	(Malaysia) SAMB
FW	(Malaysia) Mohd Muinuddin Mokhtar	
FW	(Malaysia) Muhd Shaizil Japarey	
GK	(Australia) (Malaysia) Stefan Petrovski	Deceased
MF	(Malaysia) V. Kavi Chelvan	Released

=== Mid-season ===
==== In ====
Date	Pos.	Num.	Name	From	Note
27 June 2016	MF	58	(Malaysia) Reeshafiq Alwi	(Malaysia) AirAsia Allstar	
27 June 2016	FW	60	(Malaysia) Mohd Ferris Danial	(Malaysia) FELDA United	Loan in
27 June 2016	MF	59	(Malaysia) Ahmad Ezrie Shafizie	(Malaysia) FELDA United	Loan in
27 June 2016	FW	51	(Palestine) Yashir Pinto	(Chile) Curicó Unido	
27 June 2016	DF	55	(Romania) Alexandru Tudose	Free Agent	
27 June 2016	GK		(Malaysia) Mohd Fadzley Rahim	(Malaysia) Sabah	
27 June 2016	DF	56	(Malaysia) Mohd Khuzaimie Piee	(Malaysia) PKNS	
27 June 2016	MF	57	(Malaysia) Mohd Saiful Mustafa	Free Agent	

==== Out ====
Date	Pos.	Num.	Name	To	Note
20 June 2016	MF	24	(Montenegro) Balša Božović	Released	
20 June 2016	DF	14	(South Korea) Shin Jae-pil	Released	
20 June 2016	DF	15	(Malaysia) Ahmad Shahir Ismail	SAMB	Loan out
20 June 2016	FW	30	(Malaysia) Mohd Syazwan Nordin	SAMB	Loan out
