= 2016 Malaysia Premier League =

Liga Premier
- Season: 2016
- Champions: Melaka United; 1st Second Division title
- Promoted: Melaka United; PKNS
- Relegated: Sime Darby
- Matches: 132
- Goals: 422 (3.2 per match)
- Top goalscorer: Ilija Spasojević (24 goals)
- Biggest home win: Perlis 6–1 ATM (12 February 2016); N. Sembilan 5–0 ATM (11 March 2016); PKNS 5–0 DRB-HICOM (20 May 2016)
- Biggest away win: ATM 0–6 Melaka United (17 May 2016)
- Highest scoring: PKNS 4–4 Kuantan (3 May 2016)
- Longest winning run: 10 matches Melaka United
- Longest unbeaten run: 11 matches Johor DT II
- Longest winless run: 11 matches ATM
- Longest losing run: 6 matches ATM
- Highest attendance: 35,000; Melaka United 1–1 Sime Darby (22 October 2016)
- Lowest attendance: 24; PKNS 4–4 Kuantan (3 May 2016)
- Total attendance: 268,945
- Average attendance: 2,037
- All statistics correct as of 22 October 2016.

The 2016 Liga Premier (English: 2016 Premier League), also known as the 100PLUS Liga Premier for sponsorship reasons, was the 13th season of the Liga Premier, the second-tier professional football league in Malaysia.

The season was held from 12 February and concluded on 22 October 2016.

The Liga Premier champions for 2016 season was Melaka United. The champions and runners-up were both promoted to 2017 Liga Super.

== Teams changes ==
The following teams have changed division since the 2015 season.

=== To Liga Premier ===
**Promoted from Liga FAM**

- Melaka United (champion)
- Perlis (runner-up)

**Relegated from Liga Super**

- ATM (11th place)
- Sime Darby (12th place)

=== From Liga Premier ===
**Promoted to Liga Super**

- Kedah (Defending champions)
- Penang (runner-up)
- T–Team (play-off winner)

**Relegated to Liga FAM**

- SPA (withdraw league)

=== Name changes ===
- NS Matrix were renamed to Negeri Sembilan

=== Teams, locations and stadia ===
ATM	DRB-HICOM	Johor Darul Ta'zim II	Kuala Lumpur
Temerloh Mini Stadium, Temerloh, Pahang	Proton City Stadium, Tanjung Malim, Perak	Pasir Gudang Stadium, Pasir Gudang, Johor	Selayang Stadium, Selayang, Selangor
Capacity: **10,000**	Capacity: **3,000**	Capacity: **15,000**	Capacity: **20,000**
Kuantan	Locations of the 2016 Liga Premier teams		Melaka United
Darul Makmur Stadium, Kuantan, Pahang	Locations of the 2016 Liga Premier teams		Hang Jebat Stadium, Krubong, Malacca
Capacity: **40,000**	Locations of the 2016 Liga Premier teams		Capacity: **40,000**
Negeri Sembilan	Locations of the 2016 Liga Premier teams		Perlis
Tuanku Abdul Rahman Stadium, Paroi, Negeri Sembilan	Locations of the 2016 Liga Premier teams		Tuanku Syed Putra Stadium, Kangar, Perlis
Capacity: **40,000**	Locations of the 2016 Liga Premier teams		Capacity: **20,000**
PKNS	Sabah	Sime Darby	UiTM
Shah Alam Stadium, Shah Alam, Selangor	Likas Stadium, Likas, Sabah	Selayang Stadium, Selayang, Selangor	UiTM Stadium, Shah Alam, Selangor
Capacity: **80,372**	Capacity: **35,000**	Capacity: **20,000**	Capacity: **6,000**

=== Personnel and sponsoring ===
Note: Flags indicate national team as has been defined under FIFA eligibility rules. Players may hold more than one non-FIFA nationality.

Team	Coach	Captain	Kits	Sponsor
ATM	(Malaysia) Azuan Zain	(Malaysia) Badrul Hisham Sufian	SkyHawk	
DRB-HICOM	(Malaysia) Chong Yee Fatt	(Malaysia) Abdullah Yusoff	Mizuno	DRB-HICOM
Johor Darul Ta'zim II	(Mexico) Benjamin Mora	(Singapore) Shahril Ishak	Adidas	Forest City
Kuala Lumpur	(Malaysia) Ismail Zakaria	(Malaysia) Azlan Zainal	SkyHawk	JL99 Group & Al-Bukhary Foundation
Kuantan	(Malaysia) Ahmad Nazri Mat Noor	(Malaysia) Khairul Azman Awang Long	Kappa	Wangsamakmur Capital
Melaka United	(Malaysia) Mat Zan Mat Aris	(Montenegro) Ilija Spasojević	Kronos	Edra & Mamee
Negeri Sembilan	(Australia) Gary Michael Phillips	(Australia) Taylor Regan	Mizuno	Matrix Concepts
Perlis	(Malaysia) Dollah Salleh	(Malaysia) Afif Amiruddin	Carino	
PKNS	(Malaysia) E. Elavarasan	(Argentina) Gonzalo Soto	Kappa	PKNS
Sabah	(Malaysia) Johnny Dominicus	(Malaysia) Julamri Muhammad	Adidas	Sabah Energy Corp & Asian Supply Base
Sime Darby	(Croatia) Drago Mamić	(Malaysia) Juzaili Samion	Kappa	Sime Darby
UiTM	(Malaysia) Raja Isa Raja Akram Shah	(Malaysia) Yosri Derma Raju	Umbro	Soaring Upwards

=== Managerial changes ===
Note: Flags indicate national team as has been defined under FIFA eligibility rules. Players may hold more than one non-FIFA nationality.

Team	Outgoing head coach	Manner of departure	Date of vacancy	Position in table	Incoming head coach	Date of appointment
Negeri Sembilan	(Malaysia) K. Devan	Sacked	26 August 2015	Pre-season	(Australia) Gary Phillips	24 November 2015
Perlis	(Malaysia) Yusri Che Lah	Resigned	15 October 2015	Pre-season	(Malaysia) Dollah Salleh	21 November 2015
UiTM	(Malaysia) Azuan Zain	End of contract	25 October 2015	Pre-season	(Malaysia) Raja Isa Raja Akram Shah	28 October 2015
Sime Darby	(Malaysia) Ismail Zakaria	End of contract	31 October 2015	Pre-season	(Malaysia) Abdul Ghani Malik	1 November 2015
Kuala Lumpur	(Malaysia) Tang Siew Seng	End of contract	31 October 2015	Pre-season	(Malaysia) Ismail Zakaria	25 December 2015
Sabah	(Malaysia) Azraai Khor	Sacked	6 November 2015	Pre-season	(Croatia) Vjeran Simunić	7 December 2015
Johor Darul Ta'zim II	(Croatia) Nenad Baćina	Resigned	14 December 2015	Pre-season	(Mexico) Benjamin Mora	14 December 2015
Sime Darby	(Malaysia) Abdul Ghani Malik	Resigned	10 May 2016	11th	(Croatia) Drago Mamić	10 May 2016
Kuantan	(Malaysia) Zulhamizan Zakaria	Banned (7 Month)	1 April 2016	11th	(Malaysia) Ahmad Nazri Mat Noor (Interim)	1 April 2016

=== Foreign players ===
Note: Players name in bold indicates the player is registered during the mid-season transfer window.

Club	Visa 1	Visa 2	Visa 3	Visa 4 (Asian)	Former Player
ATM	**(Kazakhstan) Gies Irisbekov**	**(Kazakhstan) Boris Formenkov**	**(Kazakhstan) Khasan Abdukarimov**	**(Uzbekistan) Sirojiddin Rakhmatullaev**	
DRB-Hicom	(Ghana) Godwin Antwi	**(Cameroon) Cédric Mbarga**	(Croatia) Ivan Babić	(South Korea) Kim Jin-yong	(Denmark) Philip Lund
Johor Darul Ta'zim II	**(Brazil) Bonfim**	(Singapore) Shahril Ishak	(Brazil) Paulo Rangel	(Singapore) Baihakki Khaizan	
Kuala Lumpur	(Brazil) Léo Carioca	(Mali) Modibo Konté	**(Chile) Diego Inostroza**	**(Palestine) Jonathan Cantillana**	(Brazil) Casagrande (Australia) Mario Karlovic
Kuantan	(Serbia) Ljubo Baranin	(Croatia) Srdjan Vidakovic	(Ivory Coast) Dao Bakary	**(South Korea) Shim Un-seob**	(Japan) Shunsuke Nakatake
Melaka United	**(Romania) Alexandru Tudose**	(Sweden) Labinot Harbuzi	(Montenegro) Ilija Spasojevic	**(Palestine) Yashir Pinto**	(Montenegro) Balša Božović (South Korea) Shin Jae-pil
Negeri Sembilan	(Australia) Taylor Regan	(England) Alex Smith	**(France) Goran Jerković**	**(Australia) Henrique**	(Australia) Joel Chianese (Australia) Andrew Nabbout
Perlis	**(Jamaica) Damion Stewart**	(The Gambia) Mohamadou Sumareh	**(Brazil) Charles Chad**	**(South Korea) Park Yong-joon**	(Nigeria) Obinna Nwaneri (Liberia) Edward Wilson (New Zealand) (Japan) Kayne Vincent
PKNS	(Argentina) Gonzalo Soto	(Argentina) Gabriel Guerra	(Argentina) Juan Cobelli	(Palestine) Matias Jadue	
Sabah	(Croatia) Igor Čerina	**(Brazil) Everton**	**(Bosnia and Herzegovina) Muamer Salibašić**	(Indonesia) Dedi Kusnandar	(Brazil) Marco Tulio (Nigeria) Prince Nnake
Sime Darby	(Ivory Coast) Frédéric Pooda	(Croatia) Mateo Roskam	**(Nigeria) Obi**	(South Korea) Ha Dae-won	(South Korea) Lee Kil-hoon
UiTM	**(Central African Republic) Franklin Anzité**	**(Cameroon) Moustapha Moctar**	**(Guam) John Matkin**	**(South Korea) Oh Joo-ho**	(South Korea) Kang Jin-wook (Brazil) Eliel (Uzbekistan) Pavel Purishkin (Kyrgyzstan) Pavel Matyash

== Results ==
=== League table ===
Pos	Team	Pld	W	D	L	GF	GA	GD	Pts	Promotion or relegation
1	Melaka United (C, P)	22	15	5	2	48	25	+23	50	Promotion to Super League
2	PKNS (P)	22	15	3	4	49	25	+24	48	Promotion to Super League
3	Johor Darul Ta'zim II	22	13	4	5	44	26	+18	43	
4	Negeri Sembilan	22	9	8	5	40	26	+14	35	
5	Kuala Lumpur	22	9	8	5	38	32	+6	35	
6	Perlis	22	10	4	8	38	32	+6	34	
7	DRB-HICOM	22	8	5	9	30	29	+1	29	
8	Kuantan	22	7	7	8	39	43	−4	28	
9	Sabah	22	5	5	12	26	41	−15	20	
10	UiTM	22	4	4	14	24	44	−20	16	
11	ATM	22	4	3	15	24	62	−38	15	
12	Sime Darby (R)	22	2	6	14	26	41	−15	12	Relegation to FAM League

Source: FAM Official Site, Football Malaysia LLP
Rules for classification: 1) Points; 2) Goal difference; 3) Number of goals scored; 4) Number of goals against
(C) Champions; (P) Promoted; (R) Relegated

=== Result table ===
Home \ Away	ATM	DRB	JDT2	KLU	KUA	MEL	NSE	PER	PKN	SAB	SDA	UIT
ATM		2–1	0–3	3–3	1–2	0–6	3–2	2–3	0–1	1–3	3–1	3–1
DRB-Hicom	4–0		0–0	1–0	2–2	0–1	1–3	2–2	1–2	2–2	2–0	4–1
Johor DT II	5–1	1–3		1–1	4–1	1–2	3–2	2–0	1–0	2–1	2–1	1–0
Kuala Lumpur	5–1	2–1	1–0		2–2	1–2	1–2	4–3	0–2	3–2	2–1	2–1
Kuantan	0–0	1–0	1–4	1–2		3–4	0–2	1–1	2–3	4–1	4–2	1–0
Melaka United	3–1	2–0	1–1	2–1	3–2		0–0	3–1	2–1	3–0	1–1	3–1
Negeri Sembilan	5–0	1–1	1–3	1–1	1–1	0–1		3–1	4–3	2–2	1–1	4–2
Perlis	6–1	1–0	1–0	2–2	1–0	2–1	2–1		0–1	2–0	2–1	0–1
PKNS	2–0	5–0	3–3	0–1	4–4	3–1	0–0	3–2		2–1	3–1	3–0
Sabah	1–0	0–2	0–1	2–2	2–3	2–2	0–0	1–0	1–3		1–0	1–2
Sime Darby	3–0	0–1	5–2	1–1	3–4	2–2	0–4	1–1	1–2	1–2		0–0
UiTM	2–2	1–2	1–4	1–1	0–0	2–3	0–1	2–5	0–3	4–1	1–0	

Updated to match(es) played on 21 October 2016. Source: Malaysia FAM website
Legend: Blue = home team win; Yellow = draw; Red = away team win.

=== Positions by round ===
Leader and promotion to 2017 Liga Super
Promotion to 2017 Liga Super
Relegation to 2017 Liga FAM

Team \ Round	1	2	3	4	5	6	7	8	9	10	11	12	13	14	15	16	17	18	19	20	21	22
Melaka United	6	6	2	3	5	3	3	1	1	2	1	1	1	1	1	1	1	1	1	1	1	1
PKNS	9	9	9	6	4	5	6	5	4	5	5	5	3	3	3	3	3	3	3	2	2	2
Johor DT II	10	10	10	10	9	9	4	4	5	4	4	3	2	2	2	2	2	2	2	3	3	3
Negeri Sembilan	8	5	7	7	2	2	2	3	2	3	3	2	4	5	5	5	5	5	5	5	5	4
Kuala Lumpur	4	2	3	1	1	1	1	2	3	1	2	4	5	4	4	4	4	4	4	4	4	5
Perlis	1	7	8	4	8	6	7	9	9	8	8	7	6	7	6	7	6	6	7	6	6	6
DRB-Hicom	3	8	4	2	3	4	5	7	7	6	6	6	8	8	7	6	7	7	6	7	7	7
Kuantan	7	3	6	8	6	7	9	6	6	7	7	8	7	6	8	8	8	8	8	8	8	8
Sabah	11	11	11	11	11	11	10	10	10	10	9	9	9	9	9	9	9	9	9	9	9	9
UiTM	2	1	1	5	7	8	8	8	8	9	10	10	10	10	10	10	10	10	10	10	11	10
ATM	12	12	12	12	12	12	12	12	12	12	12	12	12	12	11	11	11	11	11	11	10	11
Sime Darby	5	4	5	9	10	10	11	11	11	11	11	11	11	11	12	12	12	12	12	12	12	12

== Crowd Attendance ==
=== For All Venues ===
HOME	AWAY												ATTENDANCE	
HOME	ATM	DRB	JDTII	KUL	KUA	MUFC	NIS	PER	PKNS	SAB	SIM	UiTM	TOTAL	AVE
ATM	-----	210	293	232	300	505	319	150	186	38	107	275	2,615	238
DRB-HICOM	350	-----	1,175	200	250	900	300	350	400	200	200	220	4,545	413
JDT II	2,220	5,500	-----	1,175	2,235	3,600	2,500	520	3,252	1,630	2,200	2,200	27,012	2,456
Kuala Lumpur	200	278	1,200	-----	110	2,000	325	333	357	1,000	300	225	6,328	575
Kuantan	250	561	65	548	-----	500	327	178	251	685	412	115	3,892	354
Melaka United	8,960	4,000	20,000	11,000	6,000	-----	13,000	6,000	13,000	5,227	35,000	4,600	126,787	11,526
Negeri Sembilan	3,185	275	3,606	4,534	4,116	3,693	-----	3,765	4,324	3,329	1,898	2,560	35,285	3,208
Perlis	6,500	896	1,356	757	4,200	932	820	-----	915	420	638	6,390	23,824	2,166
PKNS	157	33	309	327	24	1,027	250	95	-----	65	34	13	2,334	212
Sabah	1,300	3,778	14,500	700	500	2,700	1,200	900	1,650	-----	2,220	600	30,028	2,730
Sime Darby	100	120	130	180	50	1,555	519	497	110	110	-----	120	3,491	317
UiTM	128	101	223	400	350	290	395	289	50	450	128	-----	2,804	255
	TOTAL CROWD ATTENDANCE AND AVERAGE												268,945	2,037

=== By Week ===
2016 Liga Premier Attendance
Round	Total	Games	Avg. Per Game
Matchday 1	18,448	6	3,075
Matchday 2	21,675	6	3,613
Matchday 3	12,916	6	2,152
Matchday 4	20,967	6	3,494
Matchday 5	9,141	6	1,523
Matchday 6	6,364	6	1,061
Matchday 7	13,950	6	2,325
Matchday 8	4,642	6	774
Matchday 9	18,577	6	3,096
Matchday 10	6,805	6	1,134
Matchday 11	2,565	6	428
Matchday 12	14,388	6	2,398
Matchday 13	4,723	6	787
Matchday 14	9,967	6	1,661
Matchday 15	2,691	6	449
Matchday 16	8,106	6	1,351
Matchday 17	7,746	6	1,291
Matchday 18	7,066	6	1,177
Matchday 19	6,982	6	1,163
Matchday 20	21,464	6	3,577
Matchday 21	3,373	6	562
Matchday 22	36,834	6	6,139
Total	259,390	132	1,965

source: Sistem Pengurusan Maklumat Bolasepak

== Season statistics ==
=== Top scorers ===
As of 22 December 2016

Rank	Player	Club	Goals
1	(Montenegro) Ilija Spasojević	Melaka United	24
2	(Brazil) Paulo Rangel	Johor Darul Ta'zim II	21
3	(Croatia) Ivan Babić	DRB-HICOM	16
4	(Argentina) Gabriel Guerra	PKNS	15
4	(Argentina) Juan Cobelli	PKNS	15
6	(Ivory Coast) Dao Bakary	Kuantan	13
7	(Palestine) Matías Jadue	PKNS	12
8	(Malaysia) Malik Ariff	Kuantan	10
9	(Croatia) Mateo Roskam	Sime Darby	9
10	(Australia) Andrew Nabbout	Negeri Sembilan	8
10	(Brazil) Casagrande	Kuala Lumpur	8
10	(Uzbekistan) Pavel Purishkin	UiTM	8
13	(Brazil) Charles Chad	Perlis	7
13	(Australia) Joel Chianese	Negeri Sembilan	7
13	(New Zealand) Kayne Vincent	Perlis	7
13	(Malaysia) Zaquan Adha	Johor Darul Ta'zim II	7
17	(England) Alex Smith	Negeri Sembilan	6
17	(Croatia) Igor Čerina	Sabah	6
17	(Kazakhstan) Khassan Abdukarimov	Kuala Lumpur	6
17	(Malaysia) Maxsius Musa	Sabah	6
21	(Malaysia) Afif Amiruddin	Perlis	5
21	(Liberia) Edward Wilson	Perlis	5
21	(Palestine) Jonathan Cantillana	Kuala Lumpur	5
21	(Brazil) Léo Carioca	Kuala Lumpur	5
21	(The Gambia) Mohamadou Sumareh	Perlis	5
21	(Malaysia) R. Surendran	Melaka United	5
21	(Serbia) Srđan Vidaković	Kuantan	5
21	(Malaysia) Venice Elphi	ATM	5

=== Hat-tricks ===
Player	For	Against	Result	Date
(Uzbekistan) Pavel Purishkin	UiTM	Sabah	4–1	12 February 2016
(Brazil) Paulo Rangel	Johor Darul Ta'zim II	ATM	5–1	29 February 2016
(Croatia) Ivan Babić	DRB-HICOM	UiTM	4–1	29 February 2016
(Palestine) Matías Jadue	PKNS	Kuantan	4–4	3 May 2016
(Montenegro) Ilija Spasojević^{4}	Melaka United	ATM	0–6	17 May 2016
(Malaysia) Zaquan Adha	Johor Darul Ta'zim II	Kuantan	4–1	20 May 2016
(Montenegro) Ilija Spasojević	Melaka United	ATM	3–1	21 May 2016
(Brazil) Paulo Rangel^{4}	Johor Darul Ta'zim II	UiTM	1–4	2 August 2016
(Argentina) Juan Cobelli	PKNS	Kuantan	2–3	2 August 2016
(Montenegro) Ilija Spasojević	Melaka United	UiTM	2–3	5 August 2016

Note

^{4} Player scored 4 goals

=== Own goals ===
Rank	Player	Club	Total
1	(Malaysia) Badrul Hisham Sufian	ATM	1
1	(Malaysia) Dominic Tan	Johor Darul Ta'zim II	1
1	(Argentina) Juan Cobelli	PKNS	1
1	(Malaysia) Juzaili Samion	Sime Darby	1
1	(Brazil) Leonardo Moreira	Kuala Lumpur	1
1	(South Korea) Shin Jae-pil	Melaka United	1

== Awards ==
=== Monthly awards ===
Month	Coach of the Month		Player of the Month		Reference
Month	Coach	Club	Coach	Club	Reference
February	(Malaysia) Mat Zan Mat Aris	Melaka United	None		
March - June	None				
July	None		(Montenegro) Ilija Spasojević	Melaka United	
August	None		(Montenegro) Ilija Spasojević	Melaka United	
September	None		(Croatia) Ivan Babić	DRB-Hicom	
October	None				

== See also ==
- 2016 Liga Super
- 2016 Liga FAM
- 2016 Piala FA
- 2016 Piala Malaysia
- 2016 Piala Presiden
- 2016 Piala Belia
- List of Malaysian football transfers 2016
- List of Malaysian football transfers summer 2016
