= Tudose =

Tudose is a Romanian surname. Notable people with the surname include:

- Alexandru Tudose (born 1987), Romanian footballer
- Gabriel Tudose (born 1996), Romanian footballer
- Mihai Tudose (born 1967), Romanian politician
