= Surendran Ravindran =

Malaysian footballer (born 1987)

Personal information
- Full name: Surendran a/l Ravindran
- Date of birth: 17 May 1987 (age 39)
- Place of birth: Triang, Bera, Pahang, Malaysia
- Height: 1.65 m (5 ft 5 in)
- Position: Winger

Senior career*
Years	Team	Apps	(Gls)
2008–2015	Pahang	107	(12)
2016–2018	Melaka United	52	(6)
2019	PKNS FC	10	(1)
2020	PDRM	5	(0)
- * Club domestic league appearances and goals as of 1 December 2020

Surendran a/l Ravindran (born 17 May 1987) is a Malaysian footballer who plays as a winger.

== Career statistics ==
=== Club ===
As of 28 July 2018

Appearances and goals by club, season and competition
Club	Season	League			Cup		League Cup		Continental		Total	
Club	Season	Division	Apps	Goals	Apps	Goals	Apps	Goals	Apps	Goals	Apps	Goals
Melaka United	2016	Malaysia Premier League	20	5	1	0	6	1	—		27	6
Melaka United	2017	Malaysia Super League	20	1	2	0	6	1	—		28	2
Melaka United	2018	Malaysia Super League	12	0	1	0	0	0	—		13	0
Melaka United	Total		52	6	4	0	12	2	0	0	68	8
Career total			0	0	0	0	0	0	0	0	0	0

== Honours ==
=== Club ===
Pahang

- Malaysia Cup (2): 2013, 2014
- FA Cup (1): 2014
- Malaysian Charity Shield (1): 2014

Melaka United

- Malaysia Premier League (1): 2016
