= Khair Jones =

Malaysian professional footballer

Personal information
- Full name: Khair bin Muhammad Jefri Jones
- Date of birth: 29 September 1989 (age 37)
- Place of birth: Negeri Sembilan, Malaysia
- Height: 1.91 m (6 ft 3 in)
- Position: Left-back

Team information
- Current team: UM-Damansara United
- Number: 26

Youth career
- –2010: Palmerston North Marist
- 2010–2011: Youngheart Manawatu
- 2011–2012: Palmerston North Marist

Senior career*
Years	Team	Apps	(Gls)
2012–2015	Palmerston North Marist	4	(0)
2015	Hawke's Bay United	9	(1)
2016–2018	Melaka United	53	(2)
2019	Kuala Lumpur City		
2020	Melaka United		
2021	Sarawak United	15	(1)
2022	Negeri Sembilan	14	(1)
2023–2024	Kuala Lumpur City		
2024–2025	BR Damansara	10	(1)
2025–	UM-Damansara United	1	(0)

International career^{‡}
2016–	Malaysia	4	(1)
- * Club domestic league appearances and goals as of 27 September 2025 ‡ National team caps and goals as of 22 March 2017

Khair bin Muhammad Jefri Jones (born 29 September 1989) is a Malaysian professional footballer who plays as a left-back for UM-Damansara United and the Malaysia national team.

== Club career ==
=== Melaka United ===
In February 2016, Jones joined the professional Malaysian Premier League club, Melaka United. In his first three matches playing for Melaka United, he was employed in his familiar position on the left. Thereafter, he was played as a centre-back due to his 1.91 metre height which gives him an advantage at winning aerial challenges.

== International career ==
In May 2016, Jones was called up to the Malaysian national team for the matches against Myanmar and Timor-Leste. On 28 May 2016, he earned his first international cap for Malaysia in the friendly match against Myanmar, coming on as a substitute for Fazly Mazlan in the 72nd minute at left back. In just his second appearance for Malaysia, Jones scored his first international goal in the Asian Cup Qualification play-off match against Timor-Leste on 6 June 2016. In that match, he featured in the starting eleven and played as a left winger.

== Career statistics ==
=== Club ===
As of 11 October 2022

Appearances and goals by club, season and competition.
Club performance			League		Cup		League Cup		Continental		Total	
Club	Season	League	Apps	Goals	Apps	Goals	Apps	Goals	Apps	Goals	Apps	Goals
Melaka United	2016	Malaysia Premier League	14	0	0	0	3	0	0	0	17	0
Melaka United	2017	Malaysia Super League	22	1	2	0	2	0	–		26	1
Melaka United	2018	Malaysia Super League	17	1	1	0	1	0	–		19	1
Melaka United	Total		53	2	3	0	6	0	0	0	62	2
Kuala Lumpur	2019	Malaysia Super League	0	0	0	0	2	0	0	0	2	0
Melaka United	2020	Malaysia Super League	4	0	0	0	0	0	0	0	4	0
Sarawak United	2021	Malaysia Premier League	15	1	0	0	0	0	0	0	15	1
Negeri Sembilan	2022	Malaysia Super League	14	1	0	0	0	0	0	0	14	1
Kuala Lumpur City	2023	Malaysia Super League	0	0	0	0	0	0	0	0	0	0
Career total			86	4	3	0	8	0	0	0	97	4

=== International ===
As of 22 March 2017.

National team	Year	Apps	Goals
Malaysia	2016	3	1
Malaysia	2017	1	0
Total		4	1

=== International goals ===
As of match played 6 June 2016. Malaysia score listed first, score column indicates score after each Khair Jones goal.

International goals by date, venue, cap, opponent, score, result and competition
No.	Date	Venue	Cap	Opponent	Score	Result	Competition
1	6 June 2016	Tan Sri Dato Haji Hassan Yunos Stadium, Larkin, Malaysia	2	Timor-Leste	1–0	3–0	2019 AFC Asian Cup qualification

== Personal life ==
Jones was born to Geoff Jones, a New Zealand father of Welsh descent and Norzam Mahmood, a Malaysian mother, in Seremban, Negeri Sembilan, Malaysia. He left Malaysia when he was a child with his parents and settled in Palmerston North, New Zealand, which he considers as his hometown.

== Honours ==
Club

Melaka United

- Malaysia Premier League: 2016
