= 2016 Piala Presiden (Malaysia) =

Football league in Malaysia

Piala Presiden
- Season: 2016
- Champions: Kelantan U21
- Matches: 194
- Goals: 446 (2.3 per match)
- Top goalscorer: Danial Asyraf (19 goal)
- Biggest home win: (19 May 2016); Sarawak 7–0 ATM
- Biggest away win: (03 March 2016); Kuala Lumpur 1–4 T-Team (21 April 2016); PDRM 0–3 Pahang (14 March 2016); UiTM 0–3 Kelantan (16 May 2016); Kedah 0–3 Terengganu
- Highest scoring: (07 April 2016); ATM 3–4 Sarawak (14 April 2016); Kelantan 6–1 ATM (19 May 2016); Sarawak 7–0 ATM
- Longest unbeaten run: Kelantan U21 (9 matches)
- Longest winless run: ATM U21 (15 matches)
- Longest losing run: ATM U21 (6 matches)
- Highest attendance: 3,000; Pahang U21 1–0 PDRM U21 (5 May 2016)
- Lowest attendance: 30; Selangor U21 3–3 Penang U21 (18 April 2016)
- Total attendance: 39,543
- Average attendance: 183

The 2015 Piala Presiden (referred to as the President's Cup) is the 32nd season of the Piala Presiden since its establishment in 1985. The league is currently the youth level (U21) football league in Malaysia. Kelantan U21 are the defending champions.

== Rule changes ==
The Piala Presiden is the amateur football competition in Malaysia for under-21 players. Since its inception in 1985, the Piala Presiden has been the major tournament for under-21 and under-23 players. In 2009, the format of the competition was changed with only under-20 players eligible to be fielded for the tournament. In 2015 the format of the competition reverted to the original format with under-21 players.

== Teams ==
The following teams will be participate in the 2016 Piala Presiden. In order by the number given by FAM:-

- Perlis FA
- Kuala Lumpur FA
- Penang FA
- (Malacca) Melaka United
- Pahang FA
- Kedah FA
- (Selangor) PKNS F.C.
- PDRM FA
- ATM FA
- (Kuala Lumpur) Felda United F.C.
- (Terengganu) T-Team F.C.
- Johor Darul Ta'zim III F.C.
- Negeri Sembilan FA
- Selangor FA
- Terengganu FA
- Sarawak FA
- Kelantan FA
- Perak FA
- Sabah FA
- (Selangor) UiTM F.C.

== Team summaries ==
=== Personnel and kits ===
Note: Flags indicate national team as has been defined under FIFA eligibility rules. Players and Managers may hold more than one non-FIFA nationality.

Team	Coach	Captain	Kit Manufacturer	Shirt Sponsor
ATM FA	(Malaysia) Ahmad Hakim Yahya	(Malaysia)	Skyhawk	
Johor Darul Ta'zim III F.C.	(Croatia) Ervin Boban	(Malaysia)	Adidas	Forest City
Kedah FA	(Scotland) Ian Gillan	(Malaysia)	Warrix	Discover Kedah 2016
Kelantan FA	(Malaysia) Mohd Hashim Mustapha	(Malaysia) Mohamad Faris Shah Rosli	De'eza DSV	Pamoga Qu Puteh & Chengal Jati
Felda United F.C.	(Malaysia) Sazali Saidun	(Malaysia)	FBT	FELDA
Kuala Lumpur FA	(Malaysia) Mohd Suhaimi Ismail	(Malaysia)		
Melaka United	(Malaysia) G. Torairaju	(Malaysia)	Kronos	Edra & Mamee
Negeri Sembilan FA	(Malaysia) Ahmad Fairuz Mohd Yunus	(Malaysia)	Mizuno	Matrix Concepts
Pahang FA	(Malaysia) Fuzzemi Ibrahim	(Malaysia)	Puma SE	Aras Kuasa
PDRM FA	(Malaysia) Mohd Ishak Kunju	(Malaysia)		
Perak U21	(Malaysia) Sayuddin Mohd Isa	(Malaysia)	Al-Ikhsan	Lembaga Air Perak & Perak Corp.
Perlis FA	(Malaysia) Azizul Abidin	(Malaysia)	Carino	Carino
Penang FA	(Malaysia) Kamal Khalid	(Malaysia)	Umbro	Penang Water Supply Corporation
Sabah FA	(Malaysia) Justin Ganai	(Malaysia)	Carino	Carino & BSA
Sarawak FA	(Bosnia and Herzegovina) Fuad Grbesic	(Malaysia)	Starsport	
Selangor FA	(Malaysia) Omar Ali	(Malaysia)	Lotto Sport Italia	Selangor
PKNS F.C.	(Malaysia) Ridzuan Abu Shah	(Malaysia)	Kappa	PKNS
Terengganu FA	(Malaysia) Roshaidi Wahab	(Malaysia)	Kobert	Terengganu Incorporated
T-Team F.C.	(Malaysia) Mohd Nafuzi Mohd Zain	(Malaysia)	Kobert	Terengganu Incorporated
UiTM F.C.	(Malaysia) Khairun Haled Masrom	(Malaysia)	Umbro	

== League table ==
=== Group A ===
Pos	Team	Pld	W	D	L	GF	GA	GD	Pts	Relegation
1	Kelantan U21	18	12	2	4	36	13	+23	38	Knockout Stage
2	(Johor) JDT III	18	11	5	2	25	10	+15	38	Knockout Stage
3	Terengganu U21	18	10	4	4	22	11	+11	34	Knockout Stage
4	Kedah U21	18	9	6	3	26	12	+14	33	Knockout Stage
5	Negeri Sembilan U21	18	8	5	5	20	14	+6	29	
6	(Kuala Lumpur) Felda United U21	18	7	6	5	15	14	+1	27	
7	(Selangor) UiTM U21	18	4	6	8	15	30	−15	18	
8	Sarawak U21	18	5	2	11	25	25	0	17	
9	Perlis U21	18	3	5	10	16	27	−11	14	
10	ATM U21	18	0	1	17	9	51	−42	1	

Source: FAM

=== Group B ===
Pos	Team	Pld	W	D	L	GF	GA	GD	Pts	Relegation
1	Perak U21	18	10	5	3	24	12	+12	35	Knockout Stage
2	Selangor U21	18	9	5	4	30	24	+6	32	Knockout Stage
3	(Terengganu) T-Team U21	18	9	4	5	28	15	+13	31	Knockout Stage
4	Pahang U21	18	9	3	6	27	18	+9	30	Knockout Stage
5	(Selangor) PKNS U21	18	8	3	7	21	17	+4	27	
6	PDRM U21	18	6	5	7	17	18	−1	23	
7	Kuala Lumpur U21	18	6	3	9	14	22	−8	21	
8	Penang U21	18	5	5	8	24	30	−6	20	
9	Sabah U21	18	5	3	10	13	26	−13	18	
10	(Malacca) Melaka United U21	18	3	4	11	12	27	−15	13	

Source: FAM

== Results ==
Results of the 2016 Piala Presiden season

=== Group A ===
Home \ Away	FEL	JDT	KED	KEL	SWK	PER	ATM	UIT	TRG	NSE
Felda United		2–2		0–2				1–1	1–0	0–0
Johor Darul Ta'zim	2–0						4–0			
Kedah	1–1	1–0		0–1		1–0	4–0	0–0		1–1
Kelantan	0–1	0–0	2–0		3–1		6–1			1–1
Sarawak	0–1		0–1	0–1		2–2		4–2	0–1	
Perlis	0–0	0–1		1–3			4–0		1–1	0–1
ATM	0–1	1–2	0–2		3–4			0–1	1–1	
UiTM		0–2	1–1	0–3		1–3	1–0			
Terengganu			1–0	0–1	2–0	1–0		2–1		
Negeri Sembilan	1–0		1–3		0–0		3–0	4–1	0–2	

Updated to match(es) played on 2 May 2016. Source: Malaysia President Cup 1
Legend: Blue = home team win; Yellow = draw; Red = away team win.

=== Group B ===
Home \ Away	TTE	PRK	PDRM	PHG	PEN	PKN	MEL	SEL	SAB	KLU
T–Team		2–0	2–0	1–0		2–1		2–0	0–0	
Perak			1–0		2–1			1–0	2–0	1–1
PDRM	1–1			0–3	1–0		1–1		1–0	
Pahang		0–0	1–0		3–1		0–1		3–0	0–1
Penang	2–2	1–1				2–0			3–1	
PKNS		0–0	0–2	3–0	2–1		0–0	0–1		
Melaka United	2–0	0–1			0–0			2–3	1–0	0–1
Selangor			1–1	2–2	3–3		1–0			
Sabah	0–2					2–1	2–0	2–1		1–1
Kuala Lumpur	1–4	0–2	1–2		0–2	0–1	1–3	1–1		

Updated to match(es) played on 2 May 2016. Source: Malaysia President Cup 1
Legend: Blue = home team win; Yellow = draw; Red = away team win.

== Knock-out stage ==
=== Bracket ===
Quarter-finals
Pahang U21	0	0	0
Kelantan U21	3	1	4
Terengganu U21	3	0	3
Selangor U21	0	4	4
Kedah U21	1	0	1
Perak U21	0	2	2
(Terengganu) T-Team U21	0	2	2
(Johor) JDT III	1	0	1

Semi-finals
Kelantan U21	3	0	3
Selangor U21	0	1	1
Perak U21	1	0	1
(Terengganu) T-Team U21	3	0	3

Final
Kelantan U21	1	2	3
(Terengganu) T-Team U21	1	0	1

==== Quarterfinals ====
Team 1	Agg.	Team 2	1st leg	2nd leg
Pahang U21	0 – 4	Kelantan U21	0 – 3	0 – 1
Terengganu U21	3 – 4	Selangor U21	3 – 0	0 – 4
Kedah U21	1 – 2	Perak U21	1 – 0	0 – 2
T-Team U21 (Terengganu)	1 – 2	(Johor) JDT III	0 – 1	0 – 2

==== First leg ====
5 September 2016
16:45 (UTC+8)

Pahang U21	0 – 3	Kelantan U21
	Report	Fikram Mohamad 18'; Danial Asyraf 46'; Ahmad Fuad 50'

Majlis Daerah Rompin Field, Pahang
Attendance: 400
Referee: Fitri Bin Maskon

5 September 2016
16:45 (UTC+8)

Terengganu U21	3 – 0	Selangor U21
Shafiq Shahrizan 5'; Alif Fitri 26'; Azrean Aziz 73'	Report

Sultan Mizan Zainal Abidin Stadium, Terengganu
Attendance: 400
Referee: Zilkarnain Zakaria

5 September 2016
16:45 (UTC+8)

Kedah U21	1 – 0	Perak U21
Fa'es Hafize 45+2'	Report

Darul Aman Stadium, Kedah
Attendance: 550
Referee: Muhammad Nazmi Bin Nasaruddin

5 September 2016
16:45 (UTC+8)

T-Team U21 (Terengganu)	0 – 1	(Johor) JDT III
	Report	Syazwan Andik 20'

Sultan Ismail Nasiruddin Shah Stadium, Terengganu
Attendance: 400++
Referee: Ahmad Tajudin Bin Mohd Yusoff

==== Second leg ====
26 September 2016
16:15 (UTC+8)

Kelantan U21	1 – 0	Pahang U21
Danial Asyraf 78'	Report

Sultan Mohammad IV Stadium, Kelantan
Attendance: 300
Referee: Mohd Fusser Bin Md Salih

Kelantan U21 won 4–0 on aggregate and advances to Semifinals

26 September 2016
16:15 (UTC+8)

Selangor U21	4 – 0	Terengganu U21
Badrul Amin 1'; Faizzudin Abidin 41'; K. Kannan 62'; Syahmi Safari 81'	Report

SUK Field, Selangor
Attendance: 200
Referee: Mohd Nasruddin Tamrin

Selangor U21 won 4–3 on aggregate and advances to Semifinals

26 September 2016
16:15 (UTC+8)

Perak U21	2 – 0	Kedah U21
S. Dhaya Naidu 13'; Razak Mastor 70'	Report

Perak Stadium, Perak
Attendance: 450
Referee: Ahmad Fareez Mat Suburi

Perak U21 won 2–1 on aggregate and advances to Semifinals

26 September 2016
16:15 (UTC+8)

JDT III (Johor)	0 – 2	(Terengganu) T-Team U21
	Report	Zarulizwan Mazlan 27'; Raimi Shair 52'

Pasir Gudang Stadium, Johor
Attendance: 350
Referee: Mohd Ridzuan Razali

T-Team U21 won 2–1 on aggregate and advances to Semifinals

=== Semifinals ===
Team 1	Agg.	Team 2	1st leg	2nd leg
Kelantan U21	3 – 1	Selangor U21	3 – 0	0 – 1
Perak U21	1 – 3	(Terengganu) T-Team U21	1 – 3	0 – 0

==== First leg ====
3 October 2016
20:45 (UTC+8)

Kelantan U21	3 – 0	Selangor U21
Danial Asyraf 35', 53', 90+2'	Report

Sultan Mohammad IV Stadium, Kelantan
Attendance: 395
Referee: Mohd Azwan Mohamad

3 October 2016
16:45 (UTC+8)

Perak U21	1 – 3	(Terengganu) T-Team U21
Faizwan Dorahim 21'	Report	Aqil Irfanuddin 15'; Zarulizwan Mazlan 18'; Naqib Najwan 45+5'

Perak Stadium, Perak
Attendance: 600
Referee: Mohd Ridhwan Abdul rahman

==== Second leg ====
12 October 2016
16:15 (UTC+8)

Selangor U21	1 – 0	Kelantan U21
Faizzudin Abidin 7' (pen.)	Report

SUK Field, Selangor
Attendance: 200
Referee: Zulkarnain Zakaria

Kelantan U21 won 3–1 on aggregate and advances to Final

12 October 2016
16:15 (UTC+8)

T-Team U21 (Terengganu)	0 – 0	Perak U21
	Report

Sultan Ismail Nasiruddin Shah Stadium, Terengganu
Attendance: 500
Referee: Mohd Ezanee Mohd Said

T-Team U21 won 3–1 on aggregate and advances to Final

== Final ==
Team 1	Agg.	Team 2	1st leg	2nd leg
Kelantan U21	3 – 1	(Terengganu) T-Team U21	1 – 1	2 – 0

=== First leg ===
18 October 2016
20:45 (UTC+8)

Kelantan U21	1 – 1	(Terengganu) T-Team U21
Danial Asyraf 55'	Report	Engku Yacob 64'

Sultan Mohammad IV Stadium, Kelantan
Attendance: 671
Referee: Ismail Asib Md Amin

=== Second leg ===
25 October 2016
20:45 (UTC+8)

T-Team U21 (Terengganu)	0 – 2	Kelantan U21
	Report	Raihan Huzaizi 41'; Danial Asyraf 82'

Sultan Ismail Nasiruddin Shah Stadium, Terengganu
Attendance: 4,200
Referee: Zulkarnain Zakaria

Winners with Aggregate result are Champions 2016 Piala Presiden

== Champions ==
Champions

7th title

== Goalscorer ==
=== Top scorers ===
Rank	Player	Club	Goals
1	Muhammad Danial Ashraf	Kelantan U-21	19
2	Muhammad Faizzudin Abidin	Selangor U-21	13
3	Mohd Akram Asidi	(Pahang) Terengganu U-21	12
4	R. Thivagar	Selangor U-21	9

== See also ==
- 2016 Malaysia Super League
- 2016 Malaysia Premier League
- 2016 Malaysia FAM League
- 2016 Malaysia FA Cup
- 2016 Piala Belia
