= Ezrie Shafizie =

Malaysian footballer

Personal information
- Full name: Ahmed Ezrie Shafizie bin Sazali
- Date of birth: 24 February 1986 (age 40)
- Place of birth: Kota Bharu, Kelantan, Malaysia
- Height: 1.69 m (5 ft 6 1/2 in)
- Position: Midfielder

Youth career
- 2005: Kelantan President Cup

Senior career*
| Years | Team | Apps | (Gls) |
| 2006–2009 | Kelantan | | |
| 2010–2012 | Johor | | |
| 2013 | Johor Darul Takzim | 25 | (1) |
| 2014–2015 | PDRM | 13 | (0) |
| 2016–2017 | Felda United | 6 | (0) |
| 2016 | → Melaka United (loan) | 5 | (0) |
| 2017 | Melaka United | 19 | (0) |
| 2018 | MOF FC | | (0) |
| 2019 | PDRM | 4 | (0) |
| 2020 | Kuala Lumpur | 2 | (0) |

International career^{‡}
| 2014 | Malaysia | 1 | (0) |
- * Club domestic league appearances and goals as of February 27, 2020 ‡ National team caps and goals as of July 13, 2016

Ahmed Ezrie Shafizie bin Sazali (born 24 February 1986) is a Malaysian footballer who plays as a central midfielder. Ezrie has also played for several clubs such Johor Darul Ta'zim, Johor and Kelantan.

He made his debut for the Malaysia national team in a friendly against Indonesia on 14 September 2014.

== Career statistics ==
=== Club ===
As of 25 September 2016

| Club | Season | League | | Cup | | League Cup | | Continental | | Total | |
| Club | Season | Apps | Goals | Apps | Goals | Apps | Goals | Apps | Goals | Apps | Goals |
|---|---|---|---|---|---|---|---|---|---|---|---|
| Felda United | 2016 | 0 | 0 | 0 | 0 | 0 | 0 | - | | 0 | 0 |
| Felda United | Total | 0 | 0 | 0 | 0 | 0 | 0 | - | - | 0 | 0 |
| Melaka United | 2016 | 5 | 0 | 0 | 0 | 5 | 1 | - | | 10 | 1 |
| Melaka United | 2017 | 19 | 0 | 2 | 0 | 6 | 0 | - | | 27 | 0 |
| Melaka United | Total | 0 | 0 | 0 | 0 | 0 | 0 | - | - | 0 | 0 |
| Career total | | 0 | 0 | 0 | 0 | 0 | 0 | - | - | 0 | 0 |

== Honours ==
=== Club ===
Johor Darul Ta'zim

- Malaysia FA Cup: Runners-up 2013

PDRM

- Malaysia Premier League: 2014

Melaka United

- Malaysia Premier League: 2016
