= Everton Pedalada =

Brazilian footballer (born 1984)

Personal information
- Full name: Everton Souza Santos
- Date of birth: 2 April 1984 (age 42)
- Place of birth: Guarujá, São Paulo, Brazil
- Position: Winger

Team information
- Current team: Langkawi Glory United
- Number: 11

Youth career
- 2001–2004: Santos
- Mogi Mirim

Senior career*
Years	Team	Apps	(Gls)
2007	Cascavel	0	(0)
- Vila Aurora
- São José
- Gaúcho
2010	Dubai CSC	0	(0)
2010–2011	Brothers Union		
2011–2012	Sheikh Jamal		
2012	AYL	10	(3)
2013	Itumbiara	0	(0)
2013–2014	Tarxien Rainbows	13	(0)
2014	Zejtun Corinthians		
2014	Hatta Club	11	(1)
2014	Rio Verde	0	(0)
2014–2015	New Radiant		
2015	T.C. Sports Club		
2015–2016	Al-Mussanah		
2016	Sabah	6	(1)
2018	Brothers Union	9	(0)
2019–	Langkawi Glory United		(1)
- * Club domestic league appearances and goals as of 17:39, 18 August 2019 (UTC)

Everton Souza Santos (born 2 April 1984), known simply as Everton or Everton Pedalada, is a Brazilian footballer who plays as a midfielder for Langkawi Glory United in the Malaysia M3 League.

== Early life ==
Everton was born in Guarujá, and grew up supporting local side São Paulo, but came to also like rivals Santos, signing with them in 2001 as a youth player. He spent three years with the club, training with the first team in 2004, before leaving for a French third division side.

== Club career ==
After time in the French third division, short spells at numerous clubs in Brazil, (including time with Cascavel in 2007, where he scored one goal) he joined Dubai CSC of the UAE Division One. However, he found out he would not be able to play for the UAE side and joined Bangladeshi side Brothers Union.

Everton was playing for Bangladeshi side Brothers Union in 2010, but left in 2011 for Sheik Jamal. He moved to the Maldives in 2012, and signed with Club All Youth Linkage.

He returned to Brazil to join Itumbiara in 2013, where he made 6 appearances. He then joined Maltese side Tarxien Rainbows, but was released in early January of the next year. Following his release, he signed for another Maltese club: the Zejtun Corinthians. He also played for UAE Arabian Gulf League side Hatta Club in 2014, notching up 11 games with one goal.

After his stint in Malta, and one appearance for Brazilian side Rio Verde, he returned to the Maldives with New Radiant in December 2014. However, he did not stay long, and was released in February 2015. In May 2015, he joined TC Sports Club.

He joined Sabah in June 2016 from Omani side Al-Mussanah.

== Career statistics ==
=== Club ===
As of 29 March 2019.

Club	Season	League			Cup		Continental		Other		Total	
Club	Season	Division	Apps	Goals	Apps	Goals	Apps	Goals	Apps	Goals	Apps	Goals
Cascavel	2007	—			? (Note: Appearances in the Copa Paraná)	1	–		0	0	?	1
Dubai CSC	2010–11	UAE Division One	0	0	0	0	–		0	0	0	0
All Youth Linkage	2012	Dhivehi League	10	3	0	0	0	0	0	0	10	3
Itumbiara	2013	—			0	0	–		6 (Note: Appearances in the Campeonato Goiano)	0	6	0
Tarxien Rainbows	2013–14	Maltese Premier League	13	0	1 (Note: Appearances in the Maltese FA Trophy)	0	0	0	0	0	14	0
Hatta Club	2013–14	UAE Division One	11	1	0	0	–		0	0	11	1
Rio Verde	2014	—			0	0	–		1 (Note: Appearances in the Campeonato Goiano Second Division)	0	1	0
Sabah FA	2016	Liga Premier	6	1	0	0	0	0	0	0	6	1
Brothers Union	2019	Bangladesh Premier League	9	0	0	0	0	0	0	0	9	0
Total			49	5	2+	1	0	0	7	0	58+	6
