= Khasan Abdukarimov =

Kazakhstani footballer

Personal information
- Full name: Khasan Mamyrzhanovich Abdukarimov
- Date of birth: 10 March 1990 (age 36)
- Place of birth: Kazakhstan
- Height: 1.78 m (5 ft 10 in)
- Position: Striker

Youth career
- -2009: Ordabasy

Senior career*
| Years | Team | Apps | (Gls) |
| -2009 | Ordabasy | 1 | (0) |
| 2007 | → Ordabasy-2 (loan) | 10 | (4) |
| 2010-2012 | Okzhetpes | 53 | (7) |
| 2012-2013 | Kyran | 49 | (17) |
| 2014 | Caspiy | 1 | (0) |
| 2014 | Okzhetpes | 15 | (6) |
| 2015 | Kyzylzhar | 12 | (4) |
| 2016 | ATM | | |
- * Club domestic league appearances and goals

Khasan Mamyrzhanovich Abdukarimov (Russian: Хасан Мамыржанович Абдукаримов; born 10 March 1990) is a Kazakhstani former footballer who is last known to have played as a striker for ATM.

== Career ==
Before the 2010 season, Abdukarimov signed for Kazakhstani top flight side Okzhetpes, where he made 53 league appearances and scored 7 goals.

In 2012, he signed for Kyran in the Kazakhstani second division.

In 2014, he returned to Okzhetpes.

In 2016, Abdukarimov signed for Malaysian second division club ATM after playing in the Kazakhstani Karabulak village league.
