= Reeshafiq Alwi =

Malaysian footballer

Personal information
- Full name: Reeshafiq bin Alwi
- Date of birth: 12 December 1982 (age 43)
- Place of birth: Sarawak, Malaysia
- Height: 1.69 m (5 ft 6 1/2 in)
- Position: Defensive midfielder

Youth career
- –2004: University of Malaya Football Club

Senior career*
Years	Team	Apps	(Gls)
2005–2007	Kuala Lumpur FA	62	(13)
2008–2010	KL PLUS FC	18	(2)
2011–2012	Terengganu FA	28	(3)
2013	PKNS FC		
2014	Sarawak		
2015	Melaka United	17	(0)
2016	AirAsia F.C.	11	(0)
2016	Melaka United	6	(0)
2017	MOF F.C.	11	(0)
2018	Hanelang F.C.		
2019	PJ Rangers FC		
- * Club domestic league appearances and goals

Reeshafiq bin Alwi (born 12 December 1982) is a Malaysian professional footballer.

== Career ==
Reeshafiq began his football career with University of Malaya football team in the Malaysian Inter-varsity League. In year 2005 he made into the senior squad of Kuala Lumpur FA and with the team until 2007.

In 2008 the former skipper of Kuala Lumpur FA has moved to PLUS FC and performed with the team until 2010.

Later Reeshafiq had leaves PLUS FC and joined Terengganu FA for 2011 season. In July 2011, Reeshafiq had won the Malaysian FA Cup for the first time with Terengganu FA after defeating Kelantan FA.

He played with Sarawak FA in 2014.

Reeshafiq also has represented the Malaysia at the 2004 ASEAN University Games in Surabaya, Indonesia and had won the bronze medal. Later he represented Malaysia to the 2007 World University Games or known as Universiade at Bangkok, Thailand. He is also a silver medalist at the 2008 ASEAN University Games held in Kuala Lumpur after being defeated by the team from Thailand.

== Honours ==
Melaka United

- Malaysia Premier League:2016
