= Mat Zan Mat Aris =

Malaysian footballer and coach

Personal information
- Full name: Mohd Zan bin Mat Aris
- Date of birth: 28 February 1958 (age 68)
- Place of birth: Negeri Sembilan, Malaysia
- Position: Midfielder

Team information
- Current team: Immigration (head coach)

Senior career*
Years	Team	Apps	(Gls)
1980–1992	Kuala Lumpur FA		

International career
1985–1989	Malaysia		

Managerial career
- 1996: DBKL
- 1999–2000: Kuala Lumpur
- 2001–2002: Terengganu
- 2003: Telekom Melaka
- 2004–2007: Kuala Lumpur
- 2008–2010: KL Plus
- 2011: Pos Malaysia
- 2012: Terengganu
- 2013–2014: Harimau Muda B (assistant)
- 2015–2016: Melaka United
- 2017: Petaling Jaya Rangers
- 2019: Negeri Sembilan
- 2020: Melawati
- 2021: PDRM
- 2022: Tun Razak City
- 2023–: Immigration
- * Club domestic league appearances and goals

Mat Zan Mat Aris is a Malaysian coach and former professional footballer. He is currently coaching Malaysia Super League club Immigration.

He spent most of his football career playing for Kuala Lumpur FA during the 1980s and early 1990s.

== Career ==
=== Playing career ===
Mat Zan began his career as a player for Kuala Lumpur in the early 1980s.

He played with Kuala Lumpur FA for whom he played 13 years and won treble Malaysia Cup 1987, 1988 & 1989.

Mat Zan made his full international debut in 1985 and he won Gold Medal in 1989 SEA Games at Kuala Lumpur.

=== Managerial career ===
Mat Zan start out his managerial and coaching stint as head coach for his employee while working with DBKL FC before pursuing his career as a full-time football coach. Mat Zan coached Kuala Lumpur FA in 1999 and won Malaysia FA Cup in 1999 and Charity Cup in 2000. In 2001, Mat Zan then move as head coach of Terengganu FA and He won the 2001 Malaysia Cup, 2001 Malaysia Charity Cup and second place in Malaysia League. With PLUS F.C. in 2008 he took 2nd place in Premier League and automatically promoted to Malaysia Super League. In 2012, he comeback with Terengganu FA and go through to FA Cup Semi-finals and round two in AFC Cup. In 2015 Mat Zan move to Melaka United and won 2015 Malaysia FAM League and won 2016 Malaysia Premier League. After his contract was not renewed with Melaka at the end of 2016, he was appointed as new head coach of AirAsia Allstars FC, which was renamed as Petaling Jaya Rangers F.C., for the 2017 season. He signed a 1-year contract with Negeri Sembilan form the 2019 season.

Mat Zan also assistant coached the club side of Malaysia U-21 squad, Harimau Muda B, who won plate winner Singapore Starhub League Cup, Thanj Nien Newspaper Cup, Vietnam 3rd place and Hassanal Bolkiah Cup, Brunei 3rd place

== Honours ==
=== Managerial honours ===
Kuala Lumpur FA

- 1999 Malaysia FA Cup (1): 2000 Sultan Haji Ahmad Shah Cup (1)

Terengganu FA

- 2001 Malaysia Cup (1): 2001 Sultan Haji Ahmad Shah Cup (1)

Melaka United

- 2015 Malaysia FAM League (1): 2016 Malaysia Premier League (1)

Immigration F.C.

- 2023 Malaysia M3 League (1)
