= Gabriel Tudose =

Romanian footballer

Personal information
- Full name: Gabriel Tudose
- Date of birth: 1 January 1996 (age 30)
- Place of birth: Romania
- Height: 1.77 m (5 ft 10 in)
- Position: Midfielder

Team information
- Current team: Unirea Slobozia
- Number: 13

Youth career
- Unirea Slobozia

Senior career*
Years	Team	Apps	(Gls)
2013–2015	Unirea Slobozia	15	(4)
- * Club domestic league appearances and goals as of 25 November 2009

Gabriel Tudose (born 1 January 1996) is a Romanian footballer currently under contract with Unirea Slobozia.
