= Moustapha Moctar Belbi =

Cameroonian footballer

Personal information
- Date of birth: 11 May 1986 (age 40)
- Place of birth: Douala, Cameroon
- Height: 1.90 m (6 ft 3 in)
- Position: Defensive midfielder

Youth career
- 1993–2003: Tonnerre Yaoundé

Senior career*
Years	Team	Apps	(Gls)
2004–2005	Canon Yaoundé		
2005–2007	Persikota Tangerang		
2007–2008	Saba Qom F.C.		
2008–2009	Al-Ahli Club (Manama)		
2009–2011	Riffa SC		
2011	Dhofar Club		
2011–2013	Hajer Club	26	(0)
2013–2014	Dhofar Club		
2014–2015	Al-Nahda Club (Oman)		
2016	UiTM F.C.	7	(1)
- * Club domestic league appearances and goals as of 11 September 2016

Moustapha Moctar Belbi (born 11 May 1986) at Douala) is a Cameroonian footballer.
