= Igor Čerina =

Croatian footballer

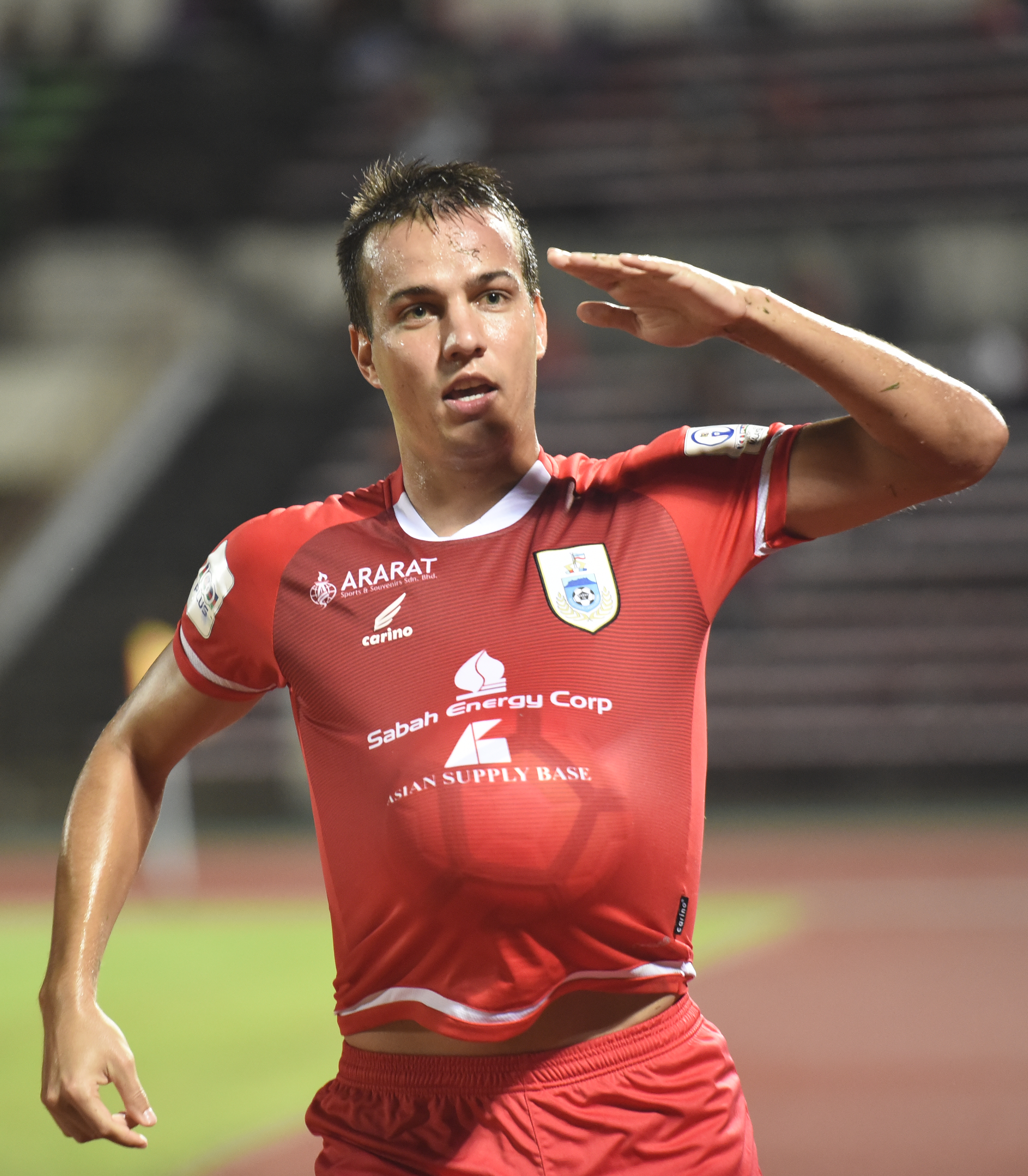
- Igor Čerina with Sabah FA in 2017

Personal information
- Full name: Igor Čerina
- Date of birth: 10 October 1988 (age 38)
- Place of birth: Split, Croatia
- Height: 1.86 m (6 ft 1 in)
- Position: Centre back

Youth career
- 1996–2006: Hajduk Split

Senior career*
Years	Team	Apps	(Gls)
2007–2011	Solin	117	(12)
2011–2012	Dugopolje	27	(1)
2012–2013	Rabotnički	8	(0)
2012–2013	Solin	13	(3)
2013–2015	Hougang United	37	(8)
2015–2016	Balestier Khalsa	27	(1)
2016–2018	Sabah	36	(10)
2018–2023	Dugopolje	103	(15)
Total		368	(50)
- * Club domestic league appearances and goals

Igor Čerina (born 10 October 1988) is a Croatian former professional footballer who played as a centre back or defensive midfielder. He was most recently the head of recruitment of Polish club Widzew Łódź.

== Career ==
=== Youth ===
Igor went through all stages of Hajduk Split youth system, before starting his senior career with NK Solin.

=== Croatia & Macedonia ===
With more than 150 caps with NK Solin, and the Croatian Second Football League title with NK Dugopolje, Igor was signed by top flight Macedonian club FK Rabotnicki. After a short spell with FK Rabotnicki, Igor is coming back as a captain to NK Solin for one more season.

=== Singapore ===
Through a recommendation of former Tampines Rovers coach Nenad Baćina Igor made a move to Hougang United, where he soon obtained captaincy. Igor would then lead the team to the club's best S-League position in history. After two successful years with Hougang United, Igor was offered a contract with AFC Cup contender Balestier Khalsa, where he spent one year and was picked for S-League team of the season.

=== Malaysia ===
In January 2016, Igor was signed by Malaysia Premier League club Sabah FA. Igor had a great first season in Sabah, scoring 10 goals in the process. Subsequently, he was given captaincy for the 2017/2018 campaign. In June 2017, Igor sustained an injury that would keep him out for a couple of months. Towards the end of the season, club's structure has changed. Due to club's new administration inherited financial problems and debt towards their captain, at end of 2018 season without solution at sight, Igor decides to terminate his contract where the club has to compensate for the damage.

=== Return to Croatia ===
After unpleasant treatment and contract breakup with Sabah FA, Igor decided to go back home. He was instantly offered a contract at his home club Dugopolje where he has a contract until the end of 2018/2019 season.
