= Rafael Bonfim =

Brazilian footballer

Personal information
- Full name: Rafael de Jesus Bonfim
- Date of birth: 24 July 1991 (age 35)
- Place of birth: Salvador, Brazil
- Height: 1.88 m (6 ft 2 in)
- Position: Centre-back

Team information
- Current team: Operário Ferroviário

Youth career
- 2008–2009: São Bernardo

Senior career*
Years	Team	Apps	(Gls)
2010–2011	Fortaleza	2	(0)
2012	Rio Branco-PR	0	(0)
2012–2015	Coritiba	7	(0)
2015	→ Bragantino (loan)	4	(0)
2016	Capivariano	0	(0)
2016	Johor Darul Ta'zim II	14	(0)
2017	Atlético Goianiense	0	(0)
2017	Cuiabá	0	(0)
2018	Veranópolis	0	(0)
2018	Juventude	27	(4)
2019	CRB	0	(0)
2019	Kalteng Putra	29	(2)
2020–	Operário Ferroviário	46	(2)
- * Club domestic league appearances and goals as of 12:41, 7 September 2020 (UTC)

Rafael de Jesus Bonfim (born 24 July 1991), sometimes known as just Bonfim, is a Brazilian footballer who plays as a central defender for Operário Ferroviário.
