= Oh Joo-ho =

South Korean footballer

Personal information
- Full name: Oh Joo-Ho
- Date of birth: 2 April 1992 (age 34)
- Place of birth: South Korea
- Height: 1.90 m (6 ft 3 in)
- Position: Defender

Team information
- Current team: Shillong Lajong
- Number: 21

Senior career*
Years	Team	Apps	(Gls)
2015–2016	Goyang Zaicro	10	(0)
2016	National Police Commissary	15	(5)
2016–2017	UiTM	18	(1)
2017–	Shillong Lajong	20	(1)
- * Club domestic league appearances and goals as of 11 October 2018

Oh Joo-ho (born 2 April 1992) is a South Korean footballer who plays for Shillong Lajong in the I-League from last two season.

== Career ==
Oh Juho from the Republic of Korea has played in Korean leagues since 2008. He also played for National Police Commissary FC of Cambodian League and UiTM of Liga Premier.
