= Mohamad Faiz Suhaimi =

Malaysian footballer

Faiz Suhaimi
Personal information
- Full name: Mohamad Faiz bin Suhaimi
- Date of birth: 13 March 1992 (age 34)
- Place of birth: Kelantan, Malaysia
- Height: 1.73 m (5 ft 8 in)
- Position: Defender

Team information
- Current team: Melaka United
- Number: 3

Youth career
- 2009–2013: Kelantan President Cup

Senior career*
Years	Team	Apps	(Gls)
2014	Kelantan FA	4	(0)
2015–2016	Melaka United	33	(1)
- * Club domestic league appearances and goals as of July 23, 2016 ‡ National team caps and goals as of July 13, 2016

Faiz Suhaimi (born 13 March 1992), is a Malaysian footballer who plays as a defender who can operate as fullback. He is also part of 2013 Kelantan President Cup Team that is the champion Malaysia President Cup after winning in the final against Perak President Cup Team 2–1.

== Club career ==
=== Early career ===
Faiz Suhaimi began his football career playing for Kelantan President's Cup team in 2009. He was part of the team and managed to bring his team won the 2013 Presidents Cup.

=== Kelantan ===
2014 was his debut year as a senior player graduated from the President's Cup team

== Honours ==
=== Club ===
Kelantan President Cup

- Malaysia President Cup: 2013

Melaka United

- Malaysia FAM League(1): 2015

Sporting positions
Preceded by Mohd Azizan Baba	Melaka United captain 2015	Succeeded by Ilija Spasojević
