= Proton City Stadium =

Stadium in Malaysia

Coordinates: 3°44′23″N 101°30′49″E

PROTON Stadium
- Interactive map of PROTON Stadium
- Location: Proton City, Perak
- Owner: Proton Holdings Berhad
- Operator: Proton Holdings Berhad
- Capacity: 3,000 (present)
- Surface: Grass

Tenant
- DRB-Hicom F.C. (2015-present)

Website
- Proton Holdings Berhad's Official Website

Proton City Stadium is located at Proton City, Muallim District, Perak, Malaysia. This stadium can accommodate 3,000 spectators. The stadium is built by Proton Holdings Berhad and currently used as the official home ground for DRB-HICOM Football Club competing in Malaysia Premier League since 2015.

== See also ==
- Proton (automobile)
