= V. Kavi Chelvan =

Malaysian footballer

Personal information
- Full name: Kavi Chelvan a/l Vivekandanthan
- Date of birth: 2 July 1989 (age 37)
- Place of birth: Malaysia
- Position: Midfielder

Team information
- Current team: PDRM FA
- Number: 25

Senior career*
Years	Team	Apps	(Gls)
2007–2009	Harimau Muda B		
2010–2012	Harimau Muda A		
2013	Selangor FA		
2014–2015	Negeri Sembilan FA		
2016	Melaka United		
2017–	PDRM FA		

International career^{‡}
2008–2011	Malaysia U-21		
2011–2012	Malaysia U-23		
- * Club domestic league appearances and goals as of 30 December 2015 ‡ National team caps and goals as of 30 December 2015

V. Kavi Chelvan (born 2 July 1989) is a Malaysian footballer who plays for PDRM FA as a midfielder. He is also a police officer, ranked Inspector, for the Royal Malaysian Police.

== Education ==
V. Kavi Chelvan graduated from Universiti Putra Malaysia with a degree in human resource on 2012. He graduated together with another notable Malaysian footballer Mahali Jasuli.
