= Diego Inostroza =

Chilean footballer (born 1992)

Personal information
- Full name: Diego Alfredo Inostroza Mellao
- Date of birth: 25 April 1992 (age 34)
- Place of birth: Santiago, Chile
- Height: 1.82 m (5 ft 11 1/2 in)
- Position: Forward

Youth career
- Universidad de Chile

Senior career*
Years	Team	Apps	(Gls)
2010–2013	Universidad de Chile	1	(0)
2012	→ Deportes Puerto Montt (loan)	12	(0)
2013	→ Barnechea (loan)	9	(2)
2013	Barnechea	0	(0)
2014	Municipal La Pintana	–	(–)
2014–2016	Deportes Pintana	57	(18)
2016	Kuala Lumpur FA	9	(3)
2017	Malleco Unido	32	(3)
Total		120	(26)
- * Club domestic league appearances and goals

Diego Alfredo Inostroza Mellao (Note: In this Spanish name, the first or paternal surname is Inostroza and the second or maternal family name is Mellao.) (born 25 April 1992) is a Chilean former footballer who played as a forward.

== Career ==
In December 2010 he officially debuted in a match against Audax Italiano, that finished in a victory for "La U" by 2–1.

In 2016, he had a stint with Malaysian club Kuala Lumpur FA, coinciding in that country with his compatriots Yashir Islame and Jonathan Cantillana. Back in Chile, his last club was Malleco Unido in the Segunda División Profesional de Chile in 2017.

== Honours ==
Universidad de Chile

- Primera División de Chile: 2011 Apertura, 2011 Clausura
