= Shin Jae-pil =

South Korean footballer (born 1982)

Shin Jae-Pil 신재필
- Shin Jae-Pil in 2016

Personal information
- Full name: Shin Jae-Pil
- Date of birth: 25 May 1982 (age 44)
- Place of birth: South Korea
- Height: 1.85 m (6 ft 1 in)
- Position: Midfielder

Team information
- Current team: MISC-MIFA
- Number: 28

Senior career*
Years	Team	Apps	(Gls)
2001–2005	Anyang LG Cheetahs / FC Seoul	1	(0)
2004–2005	→ Police FC (military service)		
2006–2009	Gimpo Hallelujah / Ansan Hallelujah	74	(2)
2010	Suwon City	7	(0)
2011–2015	Ansan Hallelujah / Goyang Hi FC	83	(1)
2015	Ezra FC	10	(0)
2015–2016	Melaka United	12	(0)
2017–	MISC-MIFA	6	(1)
- * Club domestic league appearances and goals as of 4 August 2017

Shin Jae-Pil (Korean: 신재필; born 25 May 1982) is a South Korean footballer who plays as a midfielder for Malaysian club MISC-MIFA.

== Career ==
Jae-pil joined Anyang LG Cheetahs in the 2001 K League draft. He moved to Ansan Hallelujah after finishing his military duty in Police FC.

Jae-pil was appointed a captain of the team before 2013 season starts.

=== Melaka United ===
Jae-pil joined promoted Melaka United in Malaysia Premier League from 1 January to 20 June 2016. Wearing shirt number 14.
