= Balša Božović (footballer) =

Montenegrin footballer

Personal information
- Full name: Balša Božović
- Date of birth: 1 May 1987 (age 39)
- Place of birth: Podgorica, Yugoslavia
- Height: 1.72 m (5 ft 7 1/2 in)
- Position: Midfielder

Senior career*
Years	Team	Apps	(Gls)
2005−2008	Budućnost	52	(6)
2008−2011	Mogren	60	(2)
2011−2013	Zeta	63	(4)
2013−2014	Mladost Podgorica	11	(0)
2014	Čelik Nikšić	3	(0)
2014−2015	Mornar	17	(0)
2015	Persela Lamongan	5	(1)
2015	Petrovac	9	(4)
2016	Melaka United	6	(3)
2016–2017	Iskra Danilovgrad	4	(0)
2017	Zeta	16	(3)
2018	Arema	9	(2)
2018	Mornar	12	(0)
Total		267	(25)
- * Club domestic league appearances and goals

Balša Božović (Serbian Cyrillic: Балша Божовић, born on 1 May 1987, in Podgorica) is a Montenegrin former footballer who played as midfielder.

== Honours ==
FK Mogren

- Montenegrin First League: 2008–09
- Montenegrin Cup: 2007–08
