= Yashir Islame =

Association football player (born 1991)

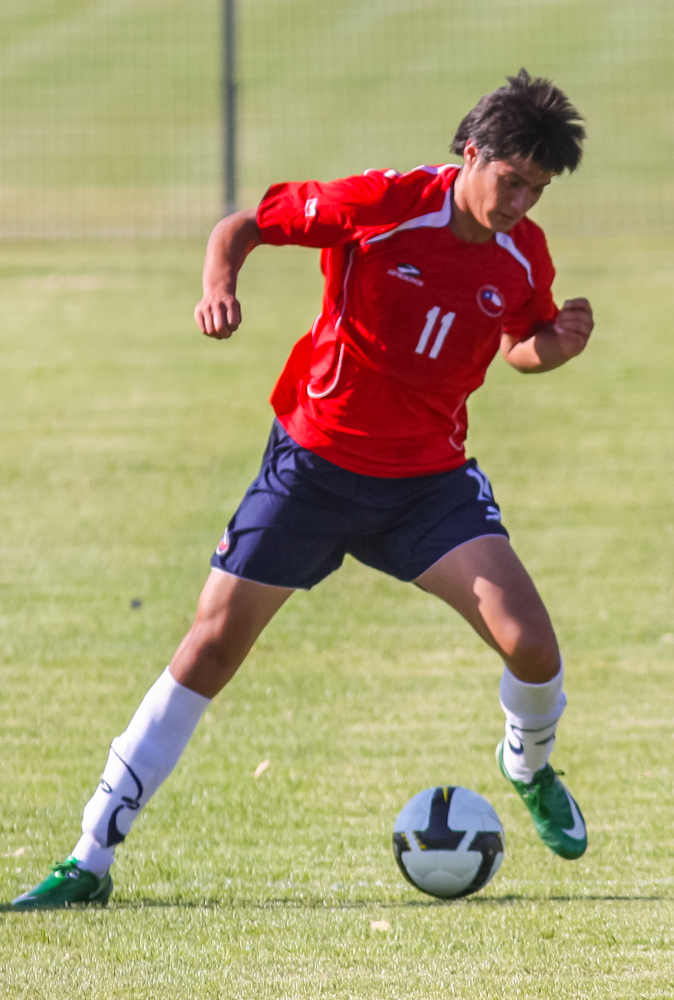
- Islame playing for Chile U18 in 2009

Personal information
- Full name: Yashir Islame Pinto
- Birth name: Yashir Armando Pinto Islame
- Date of birth: 6 February 1991 (age 35)
- Place of birth: Santiago, Chile
- Height: 1.83 m (6 ft 0 in)
- Position: Winger

Team information
- Current team: Deportes Santa Cruz

Youth career
- Colo-Colo

Senior career*
Years	Team	Apps	(Gls)
2008–2012	Colo-Colo	14	(0)
2010–2011	→ Ñublense (loan)	14	(3)
2012	→ FC Edmonton (loan)	21	(3)
2013	Lota Schwager	9	(4)
2014	Barnechea	15	(5)
2014	Újpest	0	(0)
2015–2018	Curicó Unido	26	(11)
2016	→ Melaka United (loan)	9	(4)
2017	→ Perak TBG (loan)	19	(5)
2018	Coquimbo Unido	12	(6)
2019–2020	PKNP	21	(3)
2020	Barito Putera	3	(0)
2021	Rangers	1	(0)
2021–2022	Khon Kaen United	29	(4)
2022	Negeri Sembilan	14	(2)
2023	Universidad de Concepción	16	(2)
2023–2024	Trat	13	(1)
2024	→ Police Tero (loan)	12	(1)
2024	Rayong	10	(1)
2025–2026	Ayutthaya United	40	(8)
2026–	Deportes Santa Cruz	0	(0)

International career^{‡}
2009	Chile U18	5	(8)
2010	Chile U19	2	(1)
2010–2011	Chile U20	24	(8)
2016–2019	Palestine	18	(6)
- * Club domestic league appearances and goals as of 7 August 2026 ‡ National team caps and goals as of 19 November 2019

Yashir Islame Pinto (Note: In this Chilean name, the first family name is the maternal surname Islame and the second family name is the paternal Pinto.) (Arabic: ياسر إسلامي بينتو; born Yashir Armando Pinto Islame, 6 February 1991) is a professional footballer who plays as a winger for Deportes Santa Cruz.

Born in Chile, Islame represented his native country at youth level between 2009 and 2011. He switched allegiance to Palestine in 2016, when he made his senior debut.

== Club career ==
He was born Santiago, Chile. Islame made his professional debut in Primera División de Chile on 28 June 2008 in an away match against Deportes Melipilla where Colo-Colo won 2–0. His first goal was against Fernandez Vial in the Colo-Colo victory of 4–2 in a match corresponding to the 2008 Copa Chile.

On 24 February 2012, Islame was loaned to FC Edmonton of the North American Soccer League on a season-long loan. On 14 July 2021, he signed for newly promoted Khon Kaen United.

In 2022 he joined the team Negeri Sembilan FC on a free transfer. He has helped the team secure fourth place in the Malaysia Super League in 2022. He has made 14 appearances and scored 2 goals during his time with Negeri Sembilan FC.

In the first half of 2023, he played for Universidad de Concepción in the Chilean second division. In June of the same year, he left the team to move to Thailand. In the second half of 2023, he signed with Thai League 1 side Trat FC.

In the second half of 2024, Pinto switched to Rayong. The next year, he joined Ayutthaya United in the Thai League 2.

Back to his country of birth, Islame joined Deportes Santa Cruz.

== International career ==
Islame was included in the Chile squad that played against Mexico in the Estadio Azteca on 16 May 2010, replacing the injured Esteban Paredes.

In 2016, while playing in Curicó Unido, Islame made his debut for the Palestinian national team. He was selected in Palestine's squad for the 2018 FIFA World Cup qualification match against Timor-Leste on 29 March 2016. Islame scored two goals in his debut.

== Personal life ==
He is of Palestinian descent through his maternal grandfather. In 2018 he officially reordered the sequence of his last names (Pinto Islame to Islame Pinto), while suppressing his second forename (Armando).

Islame is the younger brother of Amed Pinto, a Chilean former professional footballer.

== Career statistics ==
=== International ===
Scores and results list Palestine's goal tally first.

No	Date	Venue	Opponent	Score	Result	Competition
1.	29 March 2016	Dura International Stadium, Hebron, Palestine	Timor-Leste	3–0	7–0	2018 FIFA World Cup qualification
2.	29 March 2016	Dura International Stadium, Hebron, Palestine	Timor-Leste	4–0	7–0	2018 FIFA World Cup qualification
3.	22 March 2017	Saoud bin Abdulrahman Stadium, Al Wakrah, Qatar	Yemen	1–0	1–0	Friendly
4.	13 June 2017	Faisal Al-Husseini International Stadium, Al-Ram, Palestine	Oman	2–0	2–1	2019 AFC Asian Cup qualification
5.	5 September 2017	Changlimithang Stadium, Thimphu, Bhutan	Bhutan	1–0	2–0	2019 AFC Asian Cup qualification
6.	20 November 2018	Wuyuan River Stadium, Haikou, China	China	1–1	1–1	Friendly

== Honours ==
Colo-Colo

- Primera División de Chile: 2008 Clausura, 2009 Clausura

Melaka United

- Malaysia Premier League: 2016

Coquimbo Unido

- Primera B de Chile: 2018
