= Mamee-Double Decker =

Malaysian food manufacturing company

Mamee-Double Decker (M) Sdn. Bhd.
- Trade name: MAMEE
- Formerly: Pacific Food Products Sdn Bhd
- Type: Private Limited Company
- Industry: Food processing, snack
- Founded: 1971; 55 years ago
- Headquarters: Ayer Keroh Industrial Estate, Ayer Keroh, Malacca, Malaysia
- Areas served: Worldwide
- Key people: Pang Tee Chew, Chief Executive Officer and Managing Director; Pang Tee Nam, Chief Operations Officer
- Products: Instant noodles, dairy products, confectionery, bottled water, snacks, beverages
- Revenue: ▲RM 411.57 million (2009)
- Net income: ▲RM 44.38 million (2009)
- Total assets: ▲RM 294.45 million (2009)
- Website: www.mamee.com

Mamee-Double Decker (M) Sdn Bhd (doing business as MAMEE) is a Malaysian based company with interests in the manufacturing, marketing and distribution of snack foods, beverages, and other products, that exports to around 100 countries with the slogan "A World of Good Taste". It is very popular in areas like Singapore, Brunei, Indonesia, Southern Thailand, Maldives and Australia. The company's headquarters is located in the Ayer Keroh Industrial Estate in Malacca, Malaysia as its first tenant, and it also has an office in Subang, Selangor. One of the most popular MAMEE types is the iconic "Mamee Monster" noodle-snack type.

== History ==
The company was founded by Datuk Pang Chin Hin (冯振轩, 1926-2022) in 1971, who previously served as the company's Executive Chairman. They initially produced a brand of instant noodles named Lucky which received indifferent attention. Pang Chin Hin and his son, Tee Chew decided on converting the Lucky noodles into a snack after seeing farm workers opening the noodle packs and eating them raw sprinkled with the seasoning, Lucky was relaunched as Mamee Monster three years later.

Mamee was incorporated on 3 August 1991 and was listed on the Kuala Lumpur Stock Exchange's main board on 18 March 1992. Mamee-Double Decker was delisted from Bursa Malaysia on 9 January 2012.

Manchester United signed a sponsorship deal with Mamee Double-Decker from 2011 to 2014.
