= Alexandru Tudose =

Romanian footballer

Personal information
- Date of birth: 3 April 1987 (age 39)
- Place of birth: Galați, Romania
- Height: 1.85 m (6 ft 1 in)
- Position: Centre-back

Senior career*
Years	Team	Apps	(Gls)
2004–2005	Oțelul Galați	1	(0)
2005–2010	Steaua București	10	(0)
2005–2010	Steaua II București	19	(0)
2006–2007	→ UTA Arad (loan)	1	(0)
2007–2008	→ Gloria Buzău (loan)	39	(1)
2010–2012	Gloria Bistrița	50	(2)
2013	Dinamo București	5	(0)
2013–2014	Corona Brașov	11	(0)
2014	Săgeata Năvodari	9	(0)
2014–2015	Hoverla Uzhhorod	23	(1)
2015	Petrolul Ploiești	12	(0)
2016	Melaka United	5	(2)
2017	Târgu Mureș	7	(0)
2018	Marcerra Kuantan	3	(0)
2019	UKM	0	(0)
Total		195	(6)

International career
2005	Romania U17	7	(2)
2007–2009	Romania U21	9	(0)
- * Club domestic league appearances and goals

Alexandru Tudose (born 3 April 1987) is a Romanian former professional footballer who played as a centre-back.
