= 2019 Terengganu F.C. season =

Malaysia Super League football team

Terengganu
2019 season
- President: Dr. Samsuri Mokhtar
- Manager: Nafuzi Zain (caretaker)
- Stadium: Sultan Ismail Nasiruddin Shah Stadium
- Super League: 7th
- FA Cup: Quarter-finals
- Malaysia Cup: To be determined
- Top goalscorer: League: Sanjar Shaakhmedov (8 goals); All: Sanjar Shaakhmedov (12 goals)
| Home colours | Away colours |

The 2019 season was Terengganu's second season in the Malaysia Super League since the rebranding in 2017.

== Coaching staff ==
| Position | Staff |
|---|---|
| Manager | (Malaysia) Irfan Bakti Abu Salim (until 16 May 2019) |
| Assistant manager | (Malaysia) Mohamad Nik |
| Coaches | (Malaysia) Nafuzi Zain |
| Coaches | (Malaysia) Kamaruddin Annuar |
| Goalkeeping Coach | (Malaysia) Yazid Yassin |

== Squad information ==
As of 28 November 2018

| No. | Name | Nat | Position | Since | Date of birth (age) | Signed from |
Goalkeepers
| 1 | Shafawi Mohamad | (Malaysia) | GK | 2019 | 22 October 1997 (age 29) | Youth team |
| 25 | Ilham Amirullah | (Malaysia) | GK | 2019 | 26 February 1994 (age 32) | Negeri Sembilan |
Defenders
| 2 | Wan Amirzafran | (Malaysia) | CB | 2018 | 20 December 1994 (age 31) | Harimau Muda |
| 3 | Muhammad Mohd Faudzi | (Malaysia) | CB | 2019 | 12 April 1994 (age 32) | Youth team |
| 4 | Kamal Azizi | (Malaysia) | RB | 2018 | 20 August 1993 (age 33) | Terengganu II |
| 17 | Nasrullah Haniff | (Malaysia) | CB | 2017 | 25 June 1990 (age 36) | DRB-Hicom |
| 18 | Azalinullah Alias | (Malaysia) | LB | 2019 | 19 March 1996 (age 30) | Petaling Jaya Rangers |
| 22 | Adib Aizuddin | (Malaysia) | LB | 2017 | 23 January 1986 (age 40) | Felda United |
| 26 | Hasnizaidi Jamian | (Malaysia) | RB | 2018 | 28 March 1990 (age 36) | Felda United |
Midfielders
| 7 | Lee Tuck | (England) | AM / CM / DM | 2018 | 30 June 1988 (age 38) | Negeri Sembilan |
| 8 | Thierry Bin | (Cambodia) | DM / CM | 2018 | 1 June 1991 (age 35) | Krabi |
| 9 | Shahrul Aizad | (Malaysia) | RW / LW | 2018 | 26 March 1993 (age 33) | Kuantan |
| 11 | Syamim Yahya | (Malaysia) | CM / RW / LW | 2019 | 17 May 1990 (age 36) | Felda United |
| 13 | Khairu Azrin | (Malaysia) | DM / CM | 2019 | 13 July 1991 (age 35) | Felda United |
| 15 | Sanjar Shaakhmedov | (Uzbekistan) | CM / AM | 2019 | 23 September 1990 (age 36) | Lokomotiv Tashkent |
| 19 | Khairul Anwar | (Malaysia) | CM | 2019 | 9 October 1990 (age 36) | Negeri Sembilan |
| 20 | Sharin Sapien | (Malaysia) | CM | 2019 | 12 April 1994 (age 32) | Terengganu |
| 21 | Haidhir Suhaini | (Malaysia) | CM | 2018 | 29 July 1996 (age 30) | Terengganu II |
Forwards
| 10 | Faris Ramli | (Singapore) | ST / RW / LW | 2018 | 24 August 1992 (age 34) | Hougang United |
| 14 | Nabil Latpi | (Malaysia) | RW | 2019 | 6 September 1992 (age 34) | Ultimate |
| 16 | Khairul Izuan | (Malaysia) | RW / LW / SS | 2019 | 9 March 1991 (age 35) | Negeri Sembilan |
| 23 | Kipré Tchétché | (Ivory Coast) | ST | 2017 | 16 December 1987 (age 38) | Al-Suwaiq |
| 30 | Ashari Samsudin | (Malaysia) | ST / RW / LW | 2018 | 7 June 1985 (age 41) | Selangor FA |

== Transfers ==
=== In ===
| No. | Pos. | Name | From | Date | Ref. |
|---|---|---|---|---|---|
| 25 | GK | (Malaysia) Ilham Amirullah | (Malaysia) Negeri Sembilan | 15 November 2018 | |
| 3 | MF | (Malaysia) Muhammad Mohd Fauzi | (Malaysia) Terengganu II | | |
| 21 | MF | (Malaysia) Haidhir Suhaini | (Malaysia) Terengganu II | | |
| 20 | MF | (Malaysia) Sharin Sapien | (Malaysia) Terengganu II | | |
| 16 | FW | (Malaysia) Khairul Izuan | (Malaysia) Negeri Sembilan | | |
| 19 | FW | (Malaysia) Khairul Anwar | (Malaysia) Negeri Sembilan | | |
| 13 | MF | (Malaysia) Khairu Azrin | (Malaysia) Felda United | | |
| 11 | MF | (Malaysia) Syamim Yahya | (Malaysia) Felda United | | |
| 1 | GK | (Malaysia) Shafawi Mohamad | (Malaysia) Terengganu III | | |
| 15 | MF | (Uzbekistan) Sanjar Shaakhmedov | (Uzbekistan) Lokomotiv Tashkent | 1 January 2019 | |
| 14 | MF | (Malaysia) Nabil Latpi | (Malaysia) Ultimate | 10 May 2019 | |

=== Out ===
| No. | Pos. | Name | To | Date | Ref. |
|---|---|---|---|---|---|
| 16 | MF | (Malaysia) Partiban Janasekaran | (Malaysia) Perak | 8 November 2018 | |
| 1 | GK | (Malaysia) Faizal Yusoff | (Malaysia) Penang | 22 November 2018 | |
| 21 | GK | (Malaysia) Syazwan Yusoff | (Malaysia) Selangor United | 22 November 2018 | |
| 3 | DF | (Malaysia) Fitri Omar | (Malaysia) Kuala Lumpur | 22 November 2018 | |
| 25 | MF | (Malaysia) Azi Shahril Azmi | Unattached | 22 November 2018 | |
| 18 | MF | (Malaysia) Fauzi Kadar | Unattached | 22 November 2018 | |
| 15 | MF | (Malaysia) Faiz Nasir | (Malaysia) Terengganu II | 7 December 2018 | |
| 13 | DF | (Malaysia) Latiff Suhaimi | (Malaysia) Selangor | 9 December 2018 | |
| 19 | FW | (South Korea) Do Dong-Hyun | (South Korea) Gyeongnam | 8 January 2019 | |
| 24 | DF | (Montenegro) Igor Zonjić | Unattached | 1 June 2019 | |

== Pre-season and friendlies ==
| 27 December 2018 Friendly | TAL All Stars (Malaysia) | 0–8 | (Malaysia) Terengganu | Kuala Nerus |
| 16:45 MYT | | | | Stadium: Gong Badak Sports Complex |

| 5 January 2019 Friendly | Kelantan (Malaysia) | 1–1 | (Malaysia) Terengganu | Kota Bharu |
| 21:00 MYT | Danial 31' | | Zonjic 13' | Stadium: Sultan Muhammad IV Stadium |

| 8 January 2019 Friendly | MDB FC (Malaysia) | 3–5 | (Malaysia) Terengganu | Besut |
| 16:45 MYT | Lukman; Naim; Suffian | | Tuck (pen.); Shaakhmedov, Muhammad; Sharin | Stadium: Padang Astaka Majlis Daerah Besut |

| 10 January 2019 Friendly | Terengganu (Malaysia) | 1–2 | (Malaysia) Terengganu II | Kuala Terengganu |
| 16:45 MYT | Tuck | | Sunday; Andrieiev | Stadium: Sultan Ismail Nasiruddin Shah Stadium |

Tour of Vietnam (13 to 17 Jan 2019)

| 14 January 2019 Friendly | Becamex Bình Dương (Vietnam) | 2–3 | (Malaysia) Terengganu | Bình Dương Province |
| | | | Aizad 20'; Tuck 32' (pen.); Shaakhmedov 33' | Stadium: Gò Đậu Stadium |

| 16 January 2019 Friendly | Troung Giang (Vietnam) | 3–1 | (Malaysia) Terengganu | Thành Long Stadium |
| | | | Sanjar Shaakhmedov |

| 17 January 2019 7 | Than Quảng Ninh (Vietnam) | 4–3 | (Malaysia) Terengganu | Thành Long Stadium |
| | | | Malik; Tchetche; Shaakhmedov |

== Competitions ==
=== Malaysia Super League ===
==== League table ====
| Pos | Team | Pld | W | D | L | GF | GA | GD | Pts | Qualification or relegation |
|---|---|---|---|---|---|---|---|---|---|---|
| 5 | Perak | 22 | 8 | 9 | 5 | 36 | 31 | +5 | 33 | |
| 6 | Melaka United | 22 | 9 | 6 | 7 | 34 | 30 | +4 | 33 | |
| 7 | Terengganu | 22 | 7 | 9 | 6 | 35 | 37 | −2 | 30 | |
| 8 | Petaling Jaya City | 22 | 8 | 2 | 12 | 22 | 29 | −7 | 26 | |
| 9 | PKNS (Note: PKNS F.C. relegated after withdrawing license to complete for the 2020 Malaysia Premier League season as they become feeder club to Selangor FA.) (R) | 22 | 5 | 6 | 11 | 37 | 38 | −1 | 21 | Relegation to Malaysia Premier League |

Source: MFL
Rules for classification: 1) Points; 2) Goal difference; 3) Number of goals scored.
(R) Relegated

==== Results summary ====
| Overall | | | | | | | | Home | | | | | | Away | | | | | |
| Pld | W | D | L | GF | GA | GD | Pts | W | D | L | GF | GA | GD | W | D | L | GF | GA | GD |
|---|---|---|---|---|---|---|---|---|---|---|---|---|---|---|---|---|---|---|---|
| 22 | 7 | 9 | 6 | 35 | 37 | −2 | 30 | 4 | 5 | 2 | 20 | 16 | +4 | 3 | 4 | 4 | 15 | 21 | −6 |

Last updated: 19 July 2019.

==== Result round by round ====
| Round | 1 | 2 | 3 | 4 | 5 | 6 | 7 | 8 | 9 | 10 | 11 | 12 | 13 | 14 | 15 | 16 | 17 | 18 | 19 | 20 | 21 | 22 |
|---|---|---|---|---|---|---|---|---|---|---|---|---|---|---|---|---|---|---|---|---|---|---|
| Ground | H | A | H | A | H | H | A | H | A | H | A | A | H | A | H | A | A | H | A | H | H | A |
| Result | D | L | D | W | D | W | L | L | L | W | W | D | L | D | W | D | L | W | W | D | D | D |
| Position | 8 | 11 | 7 | 6 | 6 | 6 | 6 | 7 | 9 | 7 | 7 | 7 | 8 | 8 | 6 | 7 | 7 | 7 | 7 | 7 | 7 | 7 |

Updated to match(es) played on 19 July 2019. Source:
A = Away; H = Home; W = Win; D = Draw; L = Loss

==== Matches ====
| 1 February 2019 1 | Terengganu | 1–1 | PKNS | Kuala Terengganu |
| 21:00 MYT | Zonjić (yellow card) 73'; Malik 89' | Report | Qayyum (yellow card) 23'; Swirad 65'; Faizat (yellow card) 71'; Morales (yellow card) 89' | Stadium: Sultan Ismail Nasiruddin Shah Stadium; Referee: Mat Zan Abdul Wahab |

| 9 February 2019 2 | Pahang | 3–0 | Terengganu | Kuantan |
| 21:00 MYT | Nwakaeme 13', (yellow card) 88'; Sumareh (yellow card) 29'; Goulon 51'; Safuwan (yellow card) 56'; Norshahrul (yellow card) 90+1' | Report | Tuck (yellow card) 35'; Adib Aizuddin | Stadium: Darul Makmur Stadium; Referee: Razlan Joffri Ali |

| 15 February 2019 3 | Terengganu | 2–2 | Johor Darul Ta'zim | Kuala Terengganu |
| 21:00 MYT | Khairul Izuan 7'; Kamal (yellow card) 60', (goal) 90'; Adib Aizuddin | Report | Syamer (yellow card) 38'; Safawi 63' (pen.); Diogo 68' | Stadium: Sultan Ismail Nasiruddin Shah Stadium; Referee: Nazmi Nasaruddin |

| 22 February 2019 4 | Kuala Lumpur | 0–1 | Terengganu | Kuala Lumpur |
| 21:00 MYT | Fitri (yellow card) 51'; Sharbinee (yellow card) 65' | Report | Malik (yellow card) 54'; Tuck (yellow card) 60'; Zonjić 69', (yellow card) 79' | Stadium: Kuala Lumpur Stadium; Referee: Mohd Amirul Izwan Yaacob |

| 1 March 2019 5 | Terengganu | 1–1 | Perak | Kuala Terengganu |
| 21:00 MYT | Thierry (yellow card) 67'; Nasrullah (yellow card) 75'; Tuck 90+1' (pen.) | Report | Wander 72'; Idris (yellow card) 77'; Leandro (yellow card) 83' | Stadium: Sultan Ismail Nasiruddin Shah Stadium; Referee: Razlan Joffri Ali |

| 9 March 2019 6 | Terengganu | 3–0 | Melaka United | Kuala Terengganu |
| 21:00 MYT | Nasrullah 24', (yellow card) 70'; Shaakhmedov 42'; Malik (yellow card) 51'; Syamim 74' | Report | Saiful (yellow card) 45+1'; Faris (yellow card) 54' | Stadium: Sultan Ismail Nasiruddin Shah Stadium; Referee: Zulkarnain Zakaria |

| 29 March 2019 7 | Selangor | 1–0 | Terengganu | Shah Alam |
| 21:00 MYT | Faiz 55' | Report | Kamal (yellow card) 77'; Khairu (yellow card) 90+5' | Stadium: Shah Alam Stadium; Referee: Mohd Zohri Tajuddin |

| 6 April 2019 8 | Terengganu | 1–2 | PKNP | Kuala Terengganu |
| 21:00 MYT | Syamim (yellow card) 30', (goal) 73'; Shaakhmedov (yellow card) 56'; Thierry (yellow card) 82' | Report | Aguinaldo (yellow card) 10'; Faizzzwan (yellow card) 20'; Filemon (yellow card) 44'; Giancarlo 45' (pen.), 46', (yellow card) 62'; Al-Fateh (yellow card) 84' | Stadium: Sultan Ismail Nasiruddin Shah Stadium; Referee: Zamzaidi Katimin |

| 12 April 2019 9 | Kedah | 3–0 | Terengganu | Alor Setar |
| 21:00 MYT | Bauman 25' (pen.); Zaquan 33'; Fernando 72'; Renan (yellow card) 84' | Report | Nasrullah (yellow card) 25' | Stadium: Darul Aman Stadium; Referee: Zamzaidi Katimin |

| 19 April 2019 10 | Terengganu | 2–1 | Felda United | Kuala Terengganu |
| 21:00 MYT | Thierry (yellow card) 24'; Khairu (yellow card) 45+1'; Tchétché 50', 90', (yellow card) 54' | Report | Haziq (yellow card) 40'; Watanabe 90+4' | Stadium: Sultan Ismail Nasiruddin Shah Stadium; Referee: Mohd Hasrol Mohd Amir |

| 27 April 2019 11 | Petaling Jaya City | 1–2 | Terengganu | Petaling Jaya |
| 21:00 MYT | Rajesh 36'; Barathkumar (yellow card) 66' | Report | Thierry (yellow card) 39'; Tinagaran 67' (o.g.); Tchétché 79'; Nasrullah (yellow card) 90+4' | Stadium: Petaling Jaya Stadium; Referee: Mohd Amirul Izwan Yaacob |

| 4 May 2019 12 | PKNP | 2–2 | Terengganu | Manjung |
| 21:00 MYT | Aguinaldo 22', (yellow card) 62'; Abbey 35' | Report | Tchétché 30'; Adib Aizuddin | Stadium: Manjung Municipal Council Stadium; Referee: Zulkarnain Zakaria |

| 14 May 2019 13 | Terengganu | 3–5 | Petaling Jaya City | Kuala Terengganu |
| 22:00 MYT | Tchétché 11'; Nabil 18'; Ashari 19'; Shaakhmedov (yellow card) 47'; Amirzafran (yellow card) 90+1' | Report | Elizeu 49'; Annas (yellow card) 50'; Pedro 57', 80'; Brandão 58'; Zamri 77'; Safee (yellow card) 90+1' | Stadium: Sultan Ismail Nasiruddin Shah Stadium; Referee: Mohd Amirul Izwan Yaacob |

| 18 May 2019 14 | Felda United | 1–1 | Terengganu | Jengka |
| 22:00 MYT | Ikeda 88' | Report | Khairul Anwar (yellow card) 68'; Nabil 83' | Stadium: Tun Abdul Razak Stadium; Referee: Zamzaidi Katimin |

| 24 May 2019 15 | Terengganu | 1–0 | Selangor | Kuala Terengganu |
| 22:00 MYT | Nasrullah (yellow card) 79'; Muhammad (yellow card) 84'; Sarkunan 90+1' (o.g.) | Report | Azreen 18'; Nguyễn (yellow card) 61'; Sandro (yellow card) 79'; Namathevan 90+4' | Stadium: Sultan Ismail Nasiruddin Shah Stadium; Referee: Khirulazuan Kidam |

| 15 June 2019 16 | Melaka United | 3–3 | Terengganu | Krubong |
| 21:00 MYT | Angan 17', 49'; Milunović 31'; Reichelt (yellow card) 62'; Balić (yellow card) 72' | Report | Shaakhmedov 41', 73', 82'; Tuck (yellow card) 86'; Nasrullah (yellow card) 89' | Stadium: Hang Jebat Stadium; Referee: Mohd Nafeez Abdul Wahab |

| 18 June 2019 17 | Perak | 3–1 | Terengganu | Ipoh |
| 21:00 MYT | Shahrul 34', (yellow card) 60'; Hakim (yellow card) 45+3'; Ronaldo 69', 77' | Report | Dechi (red card) 27'; Amirzafran (yellow card) 19'; Adib Aizuddin | Stadium: Perak Stadium; Referee: Nazmi Nasaruddin |

| 26 June 2019 18 | Terengganu | 3–1 | Kuala Lumpur | Kuala Terengganu |
| 21:00 MYT | Tuck 37' (pen.); Amirzafran (yellow card) 59'; Muhammad 76'; Malik 83' | Report | Marković 41'; Paulo Josué (yellow card) 79' | Stadium: Sultan Ismail Nasiruddin Shah Stadium; Referee: Mohd Hasrol Amir |

| 5 July 2019 19 | PKNS | 1–2 | Terengganu | Shah Alam |
| 21:00 MYT | Farhan (yellow card) 41'; Nik Shahrul (yellow card) 45+2'; Kittiphong 85' | Report | Shaakhmedov 35'; Nasrullah 89' | Stadium: Shah Alam Stadium; Referee: Mohd Amirul Izwan Yaacob |

| 9 July 2019 20 | Terengganu | 2–2 | Kedah | Kuala Terengganu |
| 21:00 MYT | Shaakhmedov 33'; Amirzafran (yellow card) 45+3'; Tuck (yellow card) 57'; Tchétché 90+3' | Report | Shakir 5', (yellow card) 86'; Azmeer (yellow card) 45+1' (yellow-red card) 68'; Baddrol 45+4' | Stadium: Sultan Ismail Nasiruddin Shah Stadium; Referee: Wan Mohamad Tarmizi Wan Ibrahim |

| 12 July 2019 21 | Terengganu | 1–1 | Pahang | Kuala Terengganu |
| 21:00 MYT | Syamim 42', (yellow card) 74'; Tuck (yellow card) 56'; Adib Aizuddin | Report | Davies (yellow card) 47'; Sumareh 51'; Zubir (yellow card) 76' | Stadium: Sultan Ismail Nasiruddin Shah Stadium; Referee: Mohd Amirul Izwan Yaacob |

| 19 July 2019 22 | Johor Darul Ta'zim | 3–3 | Terengganu | Larkin |
| 21:00 MYT | Velázquez 31'; Safawi 36'; Cabrera 45', (yellow card) 83'; Azrif (yellow card) 78' | Report | Shaakhmedov 24'; Tchétché (yellow card) 35'; Nabil (yellow card) 39'; Andrieiev 65'; Tuck (yellow card) 69' (yellow-red card) 80', (goal) 79'; Sharin (yellow card) 70'; Kamal (yellow card) 90' | Stadium: Tan Sri Dato' Haji Hassan Yunos Stadium; Referee: Zulkarnain Zakaria |

=== Malaysia FA Cup ===
| 2 April 2019 Second round | Terengganu | 5–0 | Ultimate | Kuala Terengganu |
| 21:00 MYT | Ashari 2'; Zonjić 74'; Shaakhmedov 78'; Nasrullah 86' (pen.); Khairul Izuan 90+1' | Report | | Stadium: Sultan Ismail Nasiruddin Shah Stadium; Referee: Ku Alauddin Ku Muhammad |

| 16 April 2019 Third round | Kelantan United | 1–3 | Terengganu | Kota Bharu |
| 21:00 MYT | Rozaimi 10'; Fakhrul (yellow card) 64' | Report | Shaakhmedov 50'; Kipré 55'; Tuck 73' | Stadium: Sultan Muhammad IV Stadium; Referee: Abdul Halim Mohd Ramlan |

| 1 May 2019 Quarter-finals first leg | Terengganu | 2–1 | Pahang | Kuala Terengganu |
| 21:00 MYT | Malik 10'; Kipré 27'; Nasrullah (yellow card) 61' | Report | Muslim (yellow card) 32'; Zé Love 58', (yellow card) 78'; Zubir (yellow card) 83' | Stadium: Sultan Ismail Nasiruddin Shah Stadium; Referee: Zulkarnain Zakaria |

| 10 May 2019 Quarter-finals second leg | Pahang | 4–0 (5–2 agg.) | Terengganu | Kuantan |
| 22:00 MYT | Faisal 7'; Nwakaeme 48' (pen.), 63'; Sumareh 75' | Report | Suffian (yellow card) 47' | Stadium: Darul Makmur Stadium; Referee: Suhaizi Shukri |

=== Group stage ===
| Pos | Team | Pld | W | D | L | GF | GA | GD | Pts | Qualification | KED | TER | NSE | PKNS |
|---|---|---|---|---|---|---|---|---|---|---|---|---|---|---|
| 1 | Kedah | 6 | 4 | 1 | 1 | 14 | 10 | +4 | 13 | Advance to knockout stage | — | 0–2 | 4–2 | 3–2 |
| 2 | Terengganu | 6 | 4 | 0 | 2 | 14 | 8 | +6 | 12 | Advance to knockout stage | 2–3 | — | 3–1 | 3–1 |
| 3 | Negeri Sembilan | 6 | 2 | 0 | 4 | 11 | 15 | −4 | 6 | | 1–3 | 3–2 | — | 1–2 |
| 4 | PKNS | 6 | 1 | 1 | 4 | 7 | 13 | −6 | 4 | | 1–1 | 0–2 | 1–3 | — |

Source: FAM MFL

| 2 August 2019 1 | Terengganu | 3–1 | PKNS | Kuala Terengganu |
| 21:00 MYT | Shaakhmedov 6', 90+4'; Nasrullah 38'; Khairu Azrin (yellow card) 40' | Report | Jafri 30'; Nik Shahrul (yellow card) 58' | Stadium: Sultan Ismail Nasiruddin Shah Stadium; Referee: Mohd Fairuzi Mat Desa |

== Statistics ==
=== Appearances and goals ===
| No. | Pos. | Name | League | | FA Cup | | League Cup | | Total | | Discipline | |
| No. | Pos. | Name | Apps | Goals | Apps | Goals | Apps | Goals | Apps | Goals | Yellow card | Red card |
|---|---|---|---|---|---|---|---|---|---|---|---|---|
| 2 | DF | (Malaysia) Wan Amirzafran | 8 | 0 | 0 | 0 | 0 | 0 | 8 | 0 | 4 | 0 |
| 3 | DF | (Malaysia) Muhammad Faudzi | 2(4) | 1 | 0 | 0 | 0 | 0 | 2(4) | 1 | 1 | 0 |
| 4 | DF | (Malaysia) Kamal Azizi | 18(2) | 1 | 3 | 0 | 0(1) | 0 | 21(3) | 1 | 3 | 0 |
| 5 | DF | (Malaysia) Radhi Yusof | 0(1) | 0 | 0 | 0 | 0 | 0 | 0(1) | 0 | 0 | 0 |
| 7 | MF | (England) Lee Tuck | 17 | 3 | 3 | 1 | 0 | 0 | 20 | 4 | 6 | 1 |
| 8 | MF | (Cambodia) Thierry Bin | 16 | 1 | 1(3) | 0 | 0 | 0 | 17(3) | 1 | 5 | 0 |
| 9 | MF | (Malaysia) Shahrul Aizad | 2(4) | 0 | 1 | 0 | 0 | 0 | 3(4) | 0 | 0 | 0 |
| 10 | FW | (Singapore) Faris Ramli | 6(6) | 2 | 3 | 1 | 0 | 0 | 9(6) | 3 | 2 | 0 |
| 11 | MF | (Malaysia) Syamim Yahya | 14(6) | 3 | 0(4) | 0 | 1 | 0 | 15(10) | 3 | 1 | 0 |
| 13 | MF | (Malaysia) Khairu Azrin | 6(9) | 0 | 0 | 0 | 1 | 0 | 7(9) | 0 | 6 | 0 |
| 14 | MF | (Malaysia) Nabil Latpi | 6(2) | 2 | 4 | 0 | 0(1) | 0 | 10(3) | 2 | 1 | 0 |
| 15 | MF | (Uzbekistan) Sanjar Shaakhmedov | 22 | 8 | 4 | 2 | 1 | 2 | 27 | 12 | 2 | 0 |
| 16 | FW | (Malaysia) Khairul Izuan | 5(2) | 1 | 1(2) | 1 | 0 | 0 | 6(4) | 2 | 0 | 0 |
| 17 | DF | (Malaysia) Nasrullah Haniff | 16(1) | 2 | 4 | 1 | 1 | 1 | 21(1) | 4 | 7 | 0 |
| 19 | MF | (Malaysia) Khairul Anwar | 10(6) | 0 | 2(1) | 0 | 0 | 0 | 12(7) | 0 | 1 | 0 |
| 20 | MF | (Malaysia) Sharin Sapien | 7(2) | 0 | 0(1) | 0 | 1 | 0 | 8(3) | 0 | 1 | 0 |
| 21 | MF | (Malaysia) Haidhir Suhaini | 1 | 0 | 1 | 0 | 0 | 0 | 2 | 0 | 0 | 0 |
| 22 | DF | (Malaysia) Adib Aizuddin | 17(3) | 0 | 4 | 0 | 1 | 0 | 22(3) | 0 | 5 | lll0 |
| 23 | FW | (Ivory Coast) Kipré Tchétché (c) | 22 | 6 | 3 | 2 | 8 | 6 | 33 | 14 | 3 | 0 |
| 25 | GK | (Malaysia) Ilham Amirullah Razali | 9(1) | 0 | 0 | 0 | 1 | 0 | 11 | 0 | 0 | 0 |
| 26 | DF | (Malaysia) Hasnizaidi Jamian | 1 | 0 | 1 | 0 | 0 | 0 | 2 | 0 | 0 | 0 |
| 27 | GK | (Malaysia) Wan Azraie | 3 | 0 | 1 | 0 | 0 | 0 | 4 | 0 | 0 | 0 |
| 29 | GK | (Malaysia) Suffian Rahman | 10 | 0 | 3 | 0 | 0 | 0 | 13 | 0 | 1 | 0 |
| 30 | FW | (Malaysia) Ashari Samsudin | 2(8) | 1 | 0(1) | 0 | 1 | 0 | 2(9) | 0 | 0 | 0 |
| 35 | MF | (Malaysia) Rahmat Makasuf | 1(1) | 0 | 0 | 0 | 1 | 0 | 2(1) | 0 | 0 | 0 |
| 36 | FW | (Malaysia) Izzan Syahmi | 0(1) | 0 | 0 | 0 | 0 | 0 | 0(1) | 0 | 0 | 0 |
| 45 | DF | (Malaysia) Hafizal Mohamad | 4 | 0 | 0 | 0 | 1 | 0 | 5 | 0 | 0 | 0 |
| 49 | MF | (Malaysia) Shaziran Sapien | 0 | 0 | 0 | 0 | 0 | 0 | 0 | 0 | 0 | 0 |
| 56 | MF | (Malaysia) Shukur Jusoh | 0(1) | 0 | 0 | 0 | 0(1) | 0 | 0(2) | 0 | 0 | 0 |
| 57 | MF | (Ivory Coast) Dechi Marcel | 2 | 0 | 0 | 0 | 0 | 0 | 2 | 0 | 2 | 1 |
| 58 | DF | (Ukraine) Serhii Andrieiev | 1 | 1 | 0 | 0 | 1 | 0 | 2 | 1 | 0 | 0 |
| – | FW | (Malaysia) Amirul Syahmi Asha'ri | 0 | 0 | 1 | 1 | 0 | 0 | 1 | 1 | 0 | 0 |
Players transferred out during the season
| 18 | DF | (Malaysia) Azalinullah Alias | 0 | 0 | 0 | 0 | 0 | 0 | 0 | 0 | 0 | 0 |
| 24 | DF | (Serbia) Igor Zonjić | 14 | 2 | 4 | 1 | 0 | 0 | 18 | 3 | 2 | 0 |

Last updated: 2 August 2019.
Source: Soccerway
