= 2017 T-Team F.C. season =

T–Team
2017 season
- Chairman: Mazlan Ngah
- Head coach: Rahmad Darmawan
- Ground: Sultan Ismail Nasiruddin Shah Stadium (Capacity: 15,000)
- Liga Super: 9th
- Piala FA: Third round
- Piala Malaysia: Group Stage
- Top goalscorer: League: Nor Hakim Hassan (5); All: Nor Hakim Hassan (6); Dilshod Sharofetdinov (6)
- Highest home attendance: 4,510 vs Terengganu (11 March 2017)
- Lowest home attendance: 250 vs Negeri Sembilan (1 August 2017)
- Average home league attendance: 1,090

The 2017 season was T–Team's 6th season in Liga Super since being promoted.

== Sponsors ==
Title sponsor

- Chicken Cottage

Shirt sponsor

- Kobert

Official sponsors

- Terengganu Incorporated

== Competitions ==
=== Overview ===
Competition	Record							
Competition	P	W	D	L	GF	GA	GD	Win %
Liga Super	22	7	5	10	30	45	−15	31.82
Piala FA	2	0	1	1	1	2	−1	0.00
Piala Malaysia	6	1	2	3	12	14	−2	16.67
Total	30	8	8	14	43	61	−18	26.67

Updated to match played 28 October 2017
Source: Competitions

=== Pre-season and friendlies ===
16 January 2017 Friendly	T-Team (Terengganu)	2–1	(Singapore) Tampines Rovers	Kuala Terengganu, Terengganu
	Maïga 35'; Takhiyuddin 75'	Report	Džoni 45'	Stadium: Sultan Ismail Nasiruddin Shah Stadium

=== Liga Super ===
==== Matches ====
Win Draw Loss

21 January 2017 1	T-Team (Terengganu)	1–1	Sarawak	Kuala Terengganu, Terengganu
21:00 UTC+8	Nor Hakim 50'	Report	Roskam 80'	Stadium: Sultan Ismail Nasiruddin Shah Stadium; Attendance: 1,763; Referee: Zulkifli Ahmad

27 January 2017 2	Pahang	5–0	(Terengganu) T-Team	Kuantan, Pahang
21:00 UTC+8	Sumareh 14'; Alves 56', 74'; Jae-won 65'; Chinedu 85'	Report		Stadium: Darul Makmur Stadium; Attendance: 13,402; Referee: Mohd Zohri Tajuddin

4 February 2017 3	T-Team (Terengganu)	1–0	Penang	Kuala Terengganu, Terengganu
21:00 UTC+8	Samassa 71'	Report		Stadium: Sultan Ismail Nasiruddin Shah Stadium; Attendance: 821; Referee: Suhaizi Shukri

11 February 2017 4	Melaka United (Malacca)	1–2	(Terengganu) T-Team	Malacca City, Malacca
21:00 UTC+8	Jeon 48'	Report	Samassa 5'; Tadjiyev 15'	Stadium: Hang Jebat Stadium; Attendance: 7,322; Referee: Suresh Jayaraman

18 February 2017 5	T-Team (Terengganu)	2−2	(Selangor) PKNS	Kuala Terengganu, Terengganu
21:00 UTC+8	Tadjiyev 10', 45+1'	Report	Khairul 79'; Jadue 90'	Stadium: Sultan Ismail Nasiruddin Shah Stadium; Attendance: 1,231; Referee: Zamzaidi Katimin

25 February 2017 6	Johor	3–0	(Terengganu) T-Team	Johor Bahru, Johor
21:00 UTC+8	Guerra 10', 31', 40'	Report		Stadium: Tan Sri Dato Haji Hassan Yunos Stadium; Attendance: 14,807; Referee: Wan Mohamad Tarmizi

1 March 2017 7	T-Team (Terengganu)	0–0	(Kuala Lumpur) Felda United	Kuala Terengganu, Terengganu
21:00 UTC+8		Report		Stadium: Sultan Ismail Nasiruddin Shah Stadium; Attendance: 1,079+ Referee: Suresh Jayaraman

4 March 2017 8	Kelantan	4−2	(Terengganu) T-Team	Kota Bharu, Kelantan
21:00 UTC+8	Ghaddar 7', 69', 83'; Khairul Izuan 76'	Report	Nor Hakim 46'; Tadjiyev 90'	Stadium: Sultan Muhammad IV Stadium; Attendance: 10,653; Referee: Fitri Maskon

8 April 2017 9	Perak	2–2	(Terengganu) T-Team	Ipoh, Perak
21:00 UTC+8	Pinto 13'; Hadi Yahya 90+6'	Report	Sharofetdinov 49'; Fakahrurazi 72'	Stadium: Perak Stadium; Attendance: 1,961; Referee: Zamzaidi Katimin

15 April 2017 10	T-Team (Terengganu)	5–0	Kedah	Kuala Terengganu, Terengganu
21:00 UTC+8	Sharofetdinov 10'; Nor Hakim 37', 60', 64'; Samassa 45+4'	Report		Stadium: Sultan Ismail Nasiruddin Shah Stadium; Attendance: 1,144; Referee: Suresh Jayaraman

26 April 2017 11	T-Team (Terengganu)	1–0	Selangor	Kuala Terengganu, Terengganu
21:00 UTC+8	Fauzi 89'	Report		Stadium: Sultan Ismail Nasiruddin Shah Stadium; Attendance: 1,723; Referee: Fitri Maskon

6 May 2017 12	T-Team (Terengganu)	3–0	Perak	Kuala Terengganu, Terengganu
21:00 UTC+8	Samassa 9'; Amirzafran 72'; Tadjiyev 76'	Report		Stadium: Sultan Ismail Nasiruddin Shah Stadium; Attendance: 888; Referee: Fitri Maskon

24 May 2017 13	Kedah	3–0	(Terengganu) T-Team	Alor Setar, Kedah
21:00 UTC+8	Ilsø 12', 14', 45'	Report		Stadium: Darul Aman Stadium; Attendance: 10,000; Referee: Razlan Jeffri Ali

1 July 2017 14	Selangor	4–2	(Terengganu) T-Team	Selayang, Selangor
21:00 UTC+8	Syahmi 53'; Doe 54'; Rufino 83'; Kamal (o.g.) 84'	Report	Sharofetdinov 72'; N'Djeng 89'	Stadium: Selayang Stadium; Attendance: 2,285; Referee: Mohd Amirul Izwan Yaacob

11 July 2017 15	T-Team (Terengganu)	3−1	Kelantan	Kuala Terengganu, Terengganu
21:00 UTC+8	Fauzi 84'; Sharofetdinov 80'; N'Djeng 87'	Report	Khairul Izuan 63'	Stadium: Sultan Ismail Nasiruddin Shah Stadium; Attendance: 1,262; Referee: Nagor Amir Noor Mohamed

15 July 2017 16	FELDA United (Kuala Lumpur)	5−1	(Terengganu) T-Team	Jengka, Pahang
21:00 UTC+8	Wan Zack 24'; Thiago Augusto 47', 59', 79'; Olusegun 89'	Report	N'Djeng 42'	Stadium: Tun Abdul Razak Stadium; Attendance: 1,288; Referee: Suhaizi Shukri

22 July 2017 17	T-Team (Terengganu)	1−6	Johor Darul Ta'zim	Kuala Terengganu, Terengganu
21:00 UTC+8	N'Djeng 55' (pen.)	Report	Guerra 23', 59'; Ghaddar 40'; S. Kunanlan 44'; Fadhli 77'; Cabrera 81'	Stadium: Sultan Ismail Nasiruddin Shah Stadium; Attendance: 1,084; Referee: Zulkarnain Zakaria

26 July 2017 18	PKNS (Selangor)	2−1	(Terengganu) T-Team	Shah Alam, Selangor
21:00 UTC+8	Alif 35'; Nizam 42'	Report	Asrol 67'	Stadium: Shah Alam Stadium; Attendance: 44; Referee: Nagor Amir Noor Mohamed

5 August 2017 19	T-Team (Terengganu)	1−5	(Malacca) Melaka United	Kuala Terengganu, Terengganu
21:00 UTC+8	Fauzi 33'	Report	Šimić 50', 89'; Fauzi 61', 70'; Felipe 74'	Stadium: Sultan Ismail Nasiruddin Shah Stadium; Attendance: 700; Referee: Razlan Jeffri Ali

20 September 2017 20	Penang	0−2	(Terengganu) T-Team	Batu Kawan, Penang
21:00 UTC+8		Report	Fauzi 28'; Asrol 58'	Stadium: Penang State Stadium; Attendance: 603; Referee: Zulkarnain Zakaria

27 September 2017 21	T-Team (Terengganu)	0−1	Pahang	Kuala Terengganu, Terengganu
21:00 UTC+8		Report	Alves 79'	Stadium: Sultan Ismail Nasiruddin Shah Stadium; Attendance: 300; Referee: Suresh Jayaraman

28 October 2017 22	Sarawak	0−0	(Terengganu) T-Team	Kuching, Sarawak
20:15 UTC+8		Report		Stadium: Sarawak State Stadium; Attendance: 2,009; Referee: Razlan Jeffri Ali

Source: Fixtures

==== League table ====
Pos	Team	Pld	W	D	L	GF	GA	GD	Pts	Qualification or relegation
7	PKNS	22	6	7	9	33	38	−5	25	
8	Melaka United	22	6	6	10	33	46	−13	24	
9	T–Team (R)	22	7	5	10	30	45	−15	23 (Note: Kelantan and T–Team was sentenced to a six-point deduction immediately on offense failed to complete the registration process Malaysian League (M-League) 2017. Later, upon careful consideration of the aforementioned appeals, Football Malaysia have decided to lift the transfer ban and reduce the deduction of 6 points to 3 points for T-Team.)	Relegation to Premier League
10	Kelantan	22	7	4	11	31	39	−8	22 (Note: Kelantan and T–Team was sentenced to a six-point deduction immediately on offense failed to complete the registration process Malaysian League (M-League) 2017. Later, upon careful consideration of the aforementioned appeals, Football Malaysia have decided to only reduce the deduction of 6 points to 3 points for Kelantan.)	
11	Sarawak (R)	22	5	6	11	24	34	−10	21	Relegation to Premier League

Source: FAM, FMLLP
Rules for classification: 1) Points; 2) Goal difference; 3) Number of goals scored.
(R) Relegated

=== Piala FA ===
Win Draw Loss

14 February 2017 Second round	T-Team (Terengganu)	1–1 (a.e.t.) (4–2 p)	ATM	Kuala Terengganu, Terengganu
	Tadjiyev 51' (pen.)	Report	Smolyachenko 6' (pen.)	Stadium: Sultan Ismail Nasiruddin Shah Stadium; Attendance: 810; Referee: P. Jeevanathan
	Penalties
	Tadjiyev (penalty scored); Sharofetdinov (penalty scored); Fakhrurazi (penalty scored); Samassa (penalty missed); Nor Hakim (penalty scored)		Venice (penalty scored); Ikbol (penalty scored); Azim (penalty missed); Sirojiddin (penalty missed)

11 March 2017 Third round	T-Team (Terengganu)	0–1 (a.e.t.)	Terengganu	Kuala Terengganu, Terengganu
		Report	Turaev 119'	Stadium: Sultan Ismail Nasiruddin Shah Stadium; Attendance: 4,510; Referee: Nafeez Abdul Wahab

=== Piala Malaysia ===
==== Group stage ====
Pos	Team	Pld	W	D	L	GF	GA	GD	Pts	Qualification	PKNP	PHG	NSL	TTM
1	(Perak) PKNP	6	3	2	1	9	9	0	11	Advance to knockout phase	—	1–1	2–0	4–1
2	Pahang	6	2	3	1	14	8	+6	9	Advance to knockout phase	6–0	—	2–2	3–2
3	Negeri Sembilan	6	1	3	2	8	12	−4	6		0–0	2–1	—	3–3
4	(Terengganu) T–Team	6	1	2	3	12	14	−2	5		1–2	1–1	4–1	—

Updated to match(es) played on 9 September 2017. Source: FAM FMLLP

4 July 2017 1	T-Team (Terengganu)	1–2	(Perak) PKNP	Kuala Terengganu, Terengganu
21:00 UTC+8	Samassa 51'	Report	Shahrel 23', 52'	Stadium: Sultan Ismail Nasiruddin Shah Stadium; Attendance: 1,271; Referee: Suresh Jayaraman

7 July 2017 2	Negeri Sembilan	3–3	(Terengganu) T-Team	Paroi, Negeri Sembilan
21:00 UTC+8	Bruno 4'; Behe 24'; Farderin 84'	Report	Annas 54' (o.g.); Fakhrurazi 75'; Dilshod 70+5' (pen.)	Stadium: Tuanku Abdul Rahman Stadium; Attendance: 5,307; Referee: Razlan Jeffri Ali

18 July 2017 3	T-Team (Terengganu)	1–1	Pahang	Kuala Terengganu, Terengganu
21:00 UTC+8	Nor Hakim 6'	Report	Sumareh 1'	Stadium: Sultan Ismail Nasiruddin Shah Stadium; Attendance: 1,349; Referee: Mohd Amirul Izwan Yaacob

29 July 2017 4	PKNP (Perak)	4–1	(Terengganu) T-Team	Tanjung Malim, Perak
16:45 UTC+8	Hyun-woo 31'; Shahrel 39'; Hafiz 47'; Weijl 73'	Report	N'Djeng 79'	Stadium: Proton City Stadium; Attendance: 229; Referee: Zulkarnain Zakaria

1 August 2017 5	T-Team (Terengganu)	4–1	Negeri Sembilan	Kuala Terengganu, Terengganu
21:00 UTC+8	Asrol 25'; Amirzafran 40'; Sharofetdinov 49'; Fakhrurazi 80'	Report	Nizam 79'	Stadium: Sultan Ismail Nasiruddin Shah Stadium; Attendance: 250; Referee: Suresh Jayaraman

9 September 2017 6	Pahang	3–2	(Terengganu) T-Team	Kuantan, Pahang
21:00 UTC+8	Alves 40'; Azam 53'; Romero 85'	Report	Syed Sobri 52'; Maïga 56'	Stadium: Darul Makmur Stadium; Attendance: 6,878; Referee: Muhd Rahmat Jantan

== Statistics ==
=== Appearances ===
Correct as of match played on 28 October 2017

No.	Pos.	Name	League	Piala FA	Piala Malaysia	Total
1	GK	(Malaysia) Mohd Hafidz Romly	10	0	4	14
2	DF	(Malaysia) Arif Fadzilah Abu Bakar	8	1	1	10
3	DF	(Mali) Abdoulaye Maïga	19	2	6	27
4	DF	(Malaysia) Kamal Azizi Zabri	21	2	4	27
5	DF	(Malaysia) Mohd Hasbullah Awang (Captain)	22	2	4	28
6	MF	(Malaysia) Muhamad Shaziran Sapien	0	0	0	0
7	DF	(Malaysia) Hassan Basri Ahmad Ridzuan (Vice-captain)	11	1	4	15
8	MF	(Malaysia) Badrul Hisham Morris	11	1	4	16
9	MF	(Malaysia) Muhd Azrean Abd Aziz	2	1	0	3
10	FW	(Mali) Mamadou Samassa	14	2	2	18
11	MF	(Malaysia) Nor Hakim Hassan	20	2	5	27
13	MF	(Malaysia) Shakir Zufayri Ibrahim	2	0	0	2
15	MF	(Malaysia) Ahmad Takhiyuddin Roslan	9	1	2	12
16	DF	(Malaysia) Mohd Syuhiran Zainal	4	0	2	6
17	MF	(Malaysia) Syed Sobri Syed Mohamad	5	0	6	11
18	MF	(Malaysia) Muhammad Fauzi Abdul Kadar	11	0	4	15
19	FW	(Malaysia) Ramzi Sufian	4	0	0	4
20	MF	(Malaysia) Shamsul Kamal Mohamad	1	0	0	1
22	FW	(Malaysia) Ramzul Zahini Adenan	2	0	0	2
23	GK	(Malaysia) Muhammad Izzuddin Muhamat Hussin	5	2	1	8
24	DF	(Malaysia) Abdullah Suleiman	5	0	1	6
25	MF	(Malaysia) Mohd Fakhrurazi Musa	16	2	6	24
26	DF	(Malaysia) Muhd Azalinullah Mohd Alias	12	2	2	16
27	DF	(Malaysia) Wan Ahmad Amirzafran Wan Nadris	16	1	4	21
28	GK	(Malaysia) Mohd Suhaimi Husin	8	0	1	9
29	DF	(Malaysia) Aqil Irfanuddin Sabri	8	0	3	11
30	MF	(Uzbekistan) Dilshod Sharofetdinov	22	2	6	30
31	GK	(Malaysia) Mohamad Asyraf Azmi	0	0	0	0
32	DF	(Malaysia) Muhammad Naqib Najwan Saufi	0	0	0	0
33	MF	(Malaysia) Zarulizwan Mazlan	4	0	0	4
53	FW	(Malaysia) Ooi Shee Keong	3	0	2	5
55	FW	(Cameroon) Yannick N'Djeng	9	0	5	14
56	MF	(Malaysia) Mohd Asrol Ibrahim	8	0	4	12
Left club during season
−	DF	(Malaysia) Muhammad Mohd Faudzi	0	0	0	0
−	MF	(Malaysia) Mohd Naim Zakaria	0	0	0	0
−	MF	(Malaysia) Azrul Hazran Amiluddin	0	1	0	1
−	FW	(Uzbekistan) Farhod Tadjiyev	12	2	0	14

=== Top scorers ===
Correct as of match played on 28 October 2017

The list is sorted by shirt number when total goals are equal.

Rnk	No.	Player	Pos	Liga Super	Piala FA	Piala Malaysia	Total
1	11	(Malaysia) Nor Hakim Hassan	MF	5	0	1	6
1	17	(Uzbekistan) Farhod Tadjiyev	FW	5	1	0	6
1	30	(Uzbekistan) Dilshod Sharofetdinov	MF	4	0	2	6
4	10	(Mali) Mamadou Samassa	FW	4	0	1	5
4	55	(Cameroon) Yannick N'Djeng	FW	4	0	1	5
6	18	(Malaysia) Fauzi Abdul Kadar	MF	4	0	0	4
7	25	(Malaysia) Mohd Fakhrurazi Musa	MF	1	0	2	3
7	56	(Malaysia) Mohd Asrol Ibrahim	MF	2	0	1	3
9	27	(Malaysia) Wan Ahmad Amirzafran	DF	1	0	1	2
10	3	(Mali) Abdoulaye Maïga	DF	0	0	1	1
10	17	(Malaysia) Syed Sobri	MF	0	0	1	1
#	Own goals			0	0	1	1
Total				30	1	12	43

=== Clean sheets ===
Correct as of match played on 28 October 2017

The list is sorted by shirt number when total clean sheets are equal.

Rnk	No.	Player	Liga Super	Piala FA	Piala Malaysia	Total
1	1	(Malaysia) Hafidz Romly	3	0	0	3
1	28	(Malaysia) Suhaimi Husin	3	0	0	3
3	23	(Malaysia) Izzuddin Hussin	1	0	0	1
Total			7	0	0	7

== Transfers ==
=== In ===
==== First window ====
Date	Pos	Player	Transferred From
23 November 2016	GK	(Malaysia) Mohd Suhaimi Husin	(Terengganu) Hanelang
23 November 2016	DF	(Malaysia) Shakir Zufayri Ibrahim	Terengganu youth
23 November 2016	MF	(Malaysia) Muhd Azrean Abd Aziz	Terengganu youth
1 December 2016	GK	(Malaysia) Hafidz Romly	(Perak) DRB-Hicom
1 December 2016	MF	(Uzbekistan) Farhod Tadjiyev	(Uzbekistan) Olmaliq FK
21 December 2016	MF	(Malaysia) Mohd Fakhrurazi Musa	Terengganu
21 December 2016	MF	(Malaysia) Muhammad Fauzi Abdul Kadar	(Kuala Lumpur) MISC-MIFA

==== Second window ====
Date	Pos	Player	Transferred From
7 June 2017	MF	(Malaysia) Mohd Asrol Ibrahim	Terengganu
7 June 2017	MF	(Malaysia) Syed Sobri Syed Mohamad	(Malacca) Melaka United
7 June 2017	FW	(Malaysia) Ooi Shee Keong	(Malaysia) MISC-MIFA
19 June 2017	FW	(Cameroon) Yannick N'Djeng	(Tunisia) Espérance Sportive de Tunis

=== Out ===
==== First window ====
Date	Pos	Player	Transferred To
28 November 2016	GK	(Malaysia) Wan Azraie Wan Teh	Pahang
28 November 2016	DF	(Malaysia) Mohd Marzuki Yusof	Retired
28 November 2016	MF	(Malaysia) Ilham Amirullah Razali	(Kuala Lumpur) Felda United
28 November 2016	MF	(Malaysia) Muhd Akhir Bahari	(Perak) PKNP
28 November 2016	MF	(Mali) Makan Konaté	Unattached
28 November 2016	FW	(Brazil) Patrick Cruz	(Vietnam) Sài Gòn
28 November 2016	FW	(Malaysia) Mohd Asrol Ibrahim	Terengganu
28 November 2016	FW	(Malaysia) Izzaq Faris Ramlan	(Malacca) Melaka United
28 November 2016	FW	(Malaysia) Safawi Rasid	Johor Darul Ta'zim

==== Second window ====
Date	Pos	Player	Transferred To
June 2017	DF	(Malaysia) Muhammad Mohd Faudzi	Unattached
June 2017	MF	(Malaysia) Azrul Hazran Amiluddin	Unattached
June 2017	MF	(Malaysia) Mohd Naim Zakaria	Unattached
June 2017	FW	(Uzbekistan) Farhod Tadjiyev	Unattached
