= 2018 Terengganu F.C. I season =

Terengganu
2018 season
- Owner: Persatuan Bola Sepak Negeri Terengganu (PBSNT)
- President: Datuk Seri Ahmad Razif Abdul Rahman (Until 7 July 2018); Dr. Samsuri Mokhtar (Elected on 8 July 2018)
- Manager: Irfan Bakti Abu Salim
- Stadium: Sultan Ismail Nasiruddin Shah Stadium
- Super League: 5th
- FA Cup: Second round
- Malaysia Cup: Runners-up
- Top goalscorer: League: Kipré Tchétché (13); All: Kipré Tchétché (24)
Home colours	Away colours

The 2018 season was Terengganu's first season in the Malaysia Super League since the rebranding in 2017.

== Coaching staff ==
Position	Staff
Manager	(Malaysia) Irfan Bakti Abu Salim
Assistant manager	(Malaysia) Mohamad Nik
Coaches	(Malaysia) Nafuzi Zain
Coaches	(Malaysia) Kamaruddin Annuar
Goalkeeping Coach	(Malaysia) Yazid Yassin

== Squad information ==
As of 25 January 2017

Note: Flags indicate national team as defined under FIFA eligibility rules; some limited exceptions apply. Players may hold more than one non-FIFA nationality.

No.	Pos.	Nation	Player
1	GK	MAS	Faizal Yusoff
2	DF	MAS	Wan Amirzafran
3	DF	MAS	Fitri Omar
4	DF	MAS	Kamal Azizi
7	MF	ENG	Lee Tuck
8	MF	CAM	Thierry Bin
10	FW	SGP	Faris Ramli
12	MF	MAS	Shahrul Aizad
13	MF	MAS	Latiff Suhaimi (vice-captain)
15	MF	MAS	Faiz Nasir
16	MF	MAS	Partiban Janasekaran
17	DF	MAS	Nasrullah Haniff
18	MF	MAS	Fauzi Kadar

No.	Pos.	Nation	Player
19	FW	KOR	Do Dong-Hyun
21	GK	MAS	Syazwan Yusoff
22	DF	MAS	Adib Aizuddin
23	FW	CIV	Kipré Tchétché (captain)
24	DF	SRB	Igor Zonjić
25	MF	MAS	Azi Shahril
26	DF	MAS	Hasnizaidi Jamian
27	GK	MAS	Wan Azraie
29	GK	MAS	Suffian Rahman
30	FW	MAS	Ashari Samsudin
41	MF	MAS	Haidhir Suhaini
42	MF	MAS	Alif Fitri
43	DF	MAS	Hafizal Mohamad

== Transfers ==
=== In ===
1st leg

Date	Pos	No	Player	From	Type	Window	Fee	Ref
8 November 2017	GK	27	(Malaysia) Wan Azraie	(Malaysia) Pahang	Transfer	Pre-season	Free	
16 November 2017	MF	7	(England) Lee Tuck	(Malaysia) Negeri Sembilan	Transfer	Pre-season	Free	
17 November 2017	LB	3	(Malaysia) Fitri Omar	(Malaysia) Kedah	Transfer	Pre-season	Free	
19 November 2017	LM	18	(Malaysia) Fauzi Kadar	(Malaysia) Terengganu II	Transfer	Pre-season	Free	
21 November 2017	FW	10	(Singapore) Faris Ramli	(Malaysia) Kuantan	Transfer	Pre-season	Free	
21 November 2017	FW	–	(South Korea) Kim Hyun-woo	(Malaysia) PKNP	Transfer	Pre-season	Free	
24 November 2017	RB	4	(Malaysia) Kamal Azizi Zabri	(Malaysia) Terengganu II	Transfer	Pre-season	Free	
24 November 2017	CB	2	(Malaysia) Wan Ahmad Amirzafran	(Malaysia) Terengganu II	Transfer	Pre-season	Free	
1 December 2017	RM	12	(Malaysia) Shahrul Aizad	(Malaysia) Kuantan	Transfer	Pre-season	Free	
1 December 2017	MF	8	(Cambodia) Thierry Bin	(Thailand) Krabi	Transfer	Pre-season	Undisclosed	
1 December 2017	CB	24	(Serbia) Igor Zonjić	(Serbia) FK Rad	Transfer	Pre-season	Undisclosed	
14 December 2017	FW	30	(Malaysia) Ashari Samsudin	(Malaysia) Pahang	Transfer	Pre-season	Free	
-	RB	26	(Malaysia) Hasni Zaidi	(Malaysia) Felda United	Transfer	Pre-season	Free	
4 February 2018	FW	–	(South Korea) Lee Jun-hyeob	(Cambodia) National Defense Ministry	Transfer	Pre-season	Undisclosed	

2nd leg

Date	Pos	No	Player	From	Type	Window	Fee	Ref
4 June 2018	MF	19	(South Korea) Do Dong-hyun	(Malaysia) Kelantan	Transfer	Mid-season	Undisclosed	

=== Out ===
1st leg

Date	Pos	No	Player	To	Type	Window	Fee	Ref
10 November 2017	GK	1	(Malaysia) Amierul Hakimi	(Malaysia) Terengganu II	Transfer	Pre-season	Free	
3 December 2017	RB	19	(Malaysia) Mohd Firdaus Faudzi	(Malaysia) Kuala Lumpur	Transfer	Pre-season	Free	
1 February 2018	FW	–	(South Korea) Kim Hyun-woo	Unattached	Transfer	Pre-season	Released	

== Pre-season and friendlies ==
Tour of Cambodia

6 January 2018 Friendly	Svay Rieng (Cambodia)	0–1	(Malaysia) Terengganu	Svay Rieng
			Kipré Tchétché 30'	Stadium: Svay Rieng Stadium

9 January 2018 Friendly	National Defense Ministry (Cambodia)	6–3	(Malaysia) Terengganu	Phnom Penh
	Lee Jun-hyeob 25', 29', 45'; Kan Pisal 61'; Yudai Ogawa 70'; No Daeho 84'		Kipré Tchétché 30'; Kim Hyun-woo 47'; Lee Tuck 52'	Stadium: RCAF Old Stadium

10 January 2018 Friendly	Phnom Penh Crown (Cambodia)	2–1	(Malaysia) Terengganu	Phnom Penh
	Jonny Campbell 49'; Pov Ponvuthy 76'		Lee Tuck 2'	Stadium: RSN Stadium

MB Terengganu Cup

15 January 2018 Friendly	Terengganu (Malaysia)	4–2	(Malaysia) Pahang	Kuala Terengganu
	Ashari Samsudin; Igor Zonjić; Kipré Tchétché; Faiz Nasir		Philip Hellquist; Norshahrul Idlan	Stadium: Sultan Ismail Nasiruddin Shah Stadium

16 January 2018 Friendly	Terengganu (Malaysia)	0–2	(Malaysia) Terengganu II	Kuala Terengganu
			Akanni-Sunday Wasiu; Bruno Suzuki	Stadium: Sultan Ismail Nasiruddin Shah Stadium

17 January 2018 Friendly	Terengganu (Malaysia)	5–0	(Malaysia) Melaka United	Kuala Terengganu
	Shahrul Aizad; Igor Zonjić; Kipré Tchétché; Lee Tuck; Chanturu Suppiah 0' (o.g.)			Stadium: Sultan Ismail Nasiruddin Shah Stadium

== Competitions ==
=== Malaysia Super League ===
==== League table ====
Pos	Team	Pld	W	D	L	GF	GA	GD	Pts
3	PKNS	22	10	5	7	37	29	+8	35
4	Pahang	22	9	7	6	35	21	+14	34
5	Terengganu	22	10	4	8	32	31	+1	34
6	Kedah	22	9	5	8	37	36	+1	32
7	Melaka United	22	9	4	9	33	38	−5	31

Source: FAM, FMLLP
Rules for classification: 1) Points; 2) Goal difference; 3) Number of goals scored.

==== Results by matchday ====
Matchday	1	2	3	4	5	6	7	8	9	10	11	12	13	14	15	16	17	18	19	20	21	22
Ground	H	A	H	A	H	A	A	H	A	A	H	H	A	A	H	A	H	H	A	A	H	A
Result	D	D	W	W	L	W	D	L	L	W	W	W	L	L	W	L	W	W	L	D	W	L
Position	6	8	5	2	5	3	4	4	5	4	4	4	5	5	5	5	5	3	5	6	4	5

Updated to match(es) played on 29 July 2018. Source: Matches
A = Away; H = Home; W = Win; D = Draw; L = Loss

==== Matches ====
Win Draw Loss

3 February 2018 1	Terengganu	2–2	PKNS	Kuala Terengganu
21:00 MYT	Nasrullah (yellow card) 26'; Kipré 37' (pen.), 74', (yellow card) 63'; Lee Tuck (yellow card) 59'	Report	Qayyum 39'; Ramazotti 69'	Stadium: Sultan Ismail Nasiruddin Shah Stadium; Referee: Zamzaidi Katimin

6 February 2018 2	Kelantan	1–1	Terengganu	Kota Bharu
21:00 MYT	Dong 39' (pen.); Ferdinand (yellow card) 50'; Gomis (yellow card) 90+2'	Report	Kipré 1'; Aizad (yellow card) 32'; Fitri (yellow card) 39'	Stadium: Sultan Muhammad IV Stadium; Referee: Nazmi Nasaruddin

10 February 2018 3	Terengganu	4–1	Selangor	Kuala Terengganu
21:00 MYT	Lee Tuck 33', 68'; Aizad 60'; Kipré 66'; Nasrullah (yellow card) 81'	Report	Evan Dimas (yellow card) 49'; Razman (yellow card) 84'; Amri 89'	Stadium: Sultan Ismail Nasiruddin Shah Stadium; Referee: Fitri Maskon

23 February 2018 4	Negeri Sembilan	1–2	Terengganu	Paroi
21:00 MYT	Júnior (yellow card) 45+2'; Syahid (yellow card) 69'; Fakrul 74'	Report	Nasrullah (yellow card) 7'; Ashari 14'; Lee Jun-hyeob 85'; Fitri (yellow card) 90'	Stadium: Tuanku Abdul Rahman Stadium; Referee: Nagor Amir Noor Mohamed

10 March 2018 5	Terengganu	0–1	Johor Darul Ta'zim	Kuala Terengganu
21:00 MYT	Thierry Bin (yellow card) 15'; Latiff (yellow card) 27'; Zonjić (yellow card) 42'	Report	Marcos António 30'; Azrif (yellow card) 73'	Stadium: Sultan Ismail Nasiruddin Shah Stadium; Referee: Zulkarnain Zakaria

13 April 2018 6	Melaka United	0–3	Terengganu	Krubong
21:00 MYT		Report	Kipré 27', 76'; Fitri (yellow card) 38'; Nasrullah (yellow card) 42'; Lee Tuck 81'; Thierry (yellow card) 86'	Stadium: Hang Jebat Stadium

27 April 2018 7	Terengganu	1–1	Kedah	Kuala Terengganu
21:00 MYT	Latiff (yellow card) 20'; Zonjić (yellow card) 28'; Partiban 44'	Report	Rizal (yellow card) 62'; Baddrol 64'; Silva (yellow card) 88'	Stadium: Sultan Ismail Nasiruddin Shah Stadium; Referee: Wan Mohamad Tarmizi

1 May 2018 8	Terengganu	1–3	Pahang	Kuala Terengganu
21:00 MYT	Lee Tuck 73' (pen.); Latiff (yellow card) 89'; Thierry (yellow card) 90'	Report	Cruz 38', 53'; Faisal (yellow card) 72'; Kogileswaran (yellow card) 90+2'; Faizal 90+5'	Stadium: Sultan Ismail Nasiruddin Shah; Referee: Suresh Jayaraman

6 May 2018 9	Perak	3–2	Terengganu	Ipoh
21:00 MYT	Wander Luiz 5'; Gilmar 13', 38' (pen.); Azhan (yellow card) 29'	Report	Cornthwaite 19' (o.g.); Azi Shahril (yellow card) 70'; Lee Tuck 79' (pen.)	Stadium: Perak Stadium; Referee: Nagor Amir Noor Mohamed

11 May 2018 10	Pahang	0–1	Terengganu	Kuantan
21:00 MYT		Report	Adib (yellow card) 30'; Lee Tuck (yellow card) 45+2'; Partiban (yellow card) 50'; Faiz 63'; Nasrullah (yellow card) 73'; Kamal (yellow card) 89'	Stadium: Darul Makmur Stadium; Referee: Fitri Maskon

22 May 2018 11	Terengganu	2–0	Perak	Kuala Terengganu
22:00 UTC+8	Thierry Bin (yellow card) 22'; Kipré 26' (pen.), 52'; Lee Tuck (yellow card) 45+2'; Wan Azraie (yellow card) 61'	Report	Rafiuddin (yellow card) 25'	Stadium: Sultan Ismail Nasiruddin Shah Stadium; Referee: Razlan Jeffri Ali

26 May 2018 12	Terengganu	1–0	Melaka United	Kuala Terengganu
22:00 UTC+8	Kamal Azizi (yellow card) 2'; Ashari 61'; Latiff (yellow card) 83'	Report		Stadium: Sultan Ismail Nasiruddin Shah Stadium; Referee: Nagor Amir Noor Mohamed

2 June 2018 13	Kuala Lumpur	3–0	Terengganu	Kuala Lumpur
22:00 UTC+8	Zhafri 45+2', (yellow card) 74'; De Paula 46'; Paulo Josué 81'	Report		Stadium: KLFA Stadium; Referee: Muhd Rahmat Jantan

5 June 2018 14	PKNP	2–1	Terengganu	Ipoh
22:00 UTC+8	Shahrel 52' (pen.), 61'; Fadhil (yellow card) 54'	Report	Kipré 30'; Zonjić (yellow card) 83'	Stadium: Perak Stadium; Referee: Suresh Jayaraman

9 June 2018 15	Terengganu	2–1	PKNP	Kuala Terengganu
22:00 UTC+8	Lee Tuck (yellow card) 33', (goal) 71'; Kipré 68'; Thierry Bin (yellow card) 77'	Report	Anzité (yellow card) 32'; Kim Sang-Woo 79'	Stadium: Sultan Ismail Nasiruddin Shah Stadium; Referee: Zulkarnain Zakaria

20 June 2018 16	Johor Darul Ta'zim	2–0	Terengganu	Larkin
21:00 UTC+8	Marcos António 8'; Cabrera 35'; Aidil Zafuan (red card) 72'	Report	Lee Tuck (yellow card) 21'	Stadium: Tan Sri Dato' Haji Hassan Yunos Stadium; Referee: Razlan Jeffri Ali

27 June 2018 17	Terengganu	3–2	Negeri Sembilan	Kuala Terengganu
21:00 UTC+8	Kipré 32', 57' (pen.), 66'; Kamal Azizi (yellow card) 74'; Suffian (yellow card) 90+5'	Report	Vélez 44', 45+3', (yellow card) 73'; Fakhrul Aiman (yellow card) 56'	Stadium: Sultan Ismail Nasiruddin Shah Stadium; Referee: Wan Mohamad Tarmizi

10 July 2018 18	Terengganu	3–1	Kuala Lumpur	Kuala Terengganu
21:00 UTC+8	Malik 38'; Zonjić 53'; Latiff 90+2'	Report	Firdaus (yellow card) 31' de Paula 34'	Stadium: Sultan Ismail Nasiruddin Shah Stadium; Referee: Suhaizi Shukri

14 July 2018 19	PKNS	4–0	Terengganu	Shah Alam
21:00 UTC+8	Bruno Matos 16' (pen.), 79'; Zac Anderson 38'; Jafri Chew 66'; Romel Morales (yellow card) 71'	Report		Stadium: Shah Alam Stadium; Referee: Mohd Nafeez Abdul Wahab

17 July 2018 20	Kedah	1–1	Terengganu	Alor Setar
21:00 UTC+8	Baddrol 44'	Report	Kamal Azizi 62'	Stadium: Darul Aman Stadium; Referee: Razlan Jeffri Ali

23 July 2018 21	Terengganu	2–0	Kelantan	Kuala Terengganu
21:00 UTC+8	Thierry Bin (yellow card) 17'; Tchétché 44'; Kamal Azizi 54'; Lee Tuck (yellow card) 62'	Report	Cristiano Santos (yellow card) 61'	Stadium: Sultan Ismail Nasiruddin Shah Stadium; Referee: Nazmi Nasaruddin

29 July 2018 22	Selangor	2–0	Terengganu	Cheras
21:00 UTC+8	Syahmi 72'; Rufino 90'	Report	Zonjić (yellow card) 90+2'	Stadium: KLFA Stadium; Referee: Suhaizi Shukri

=== Malaysia FA Cup ===
3 March 2018 Second round	Petaling Jaya Rangers	0–4	Terengganu	Petaling Jaya
16:15 MYT		Report	Lee Tuck 37'; Zonjić 59'; Aizad 75'; Kipré 84' (pen.)	Stadium: Petaling Jaya Stadium; Referee: Wan Mohamad Tarmizi

16 March 2018 Third round	Terengganu	1–3	Selangor	Kuala Terengganu
21:00 MYT	Aizad 25'; Thierry Bin (yellow card) 60'; Fitri (yellow card) 70'	Report	Amri (yellow card) 7'; Rufino 27', 69' (pen.); Evan Dimas 61'; Pacheco (yellow card) 83'; Halim (yellow card) 90'	Stadium: Sultan Ismail Nasiruddin Shah Stadium; Referee: Nagor Amir Noor Mohamed

=== Malaysia Cup ===
==== Group stage ====
Pos	Team	Pld	W	D	L	GF	GA	GD	Pts	Qualification	TER	PRK	FLC	KL
1	Terengganu	6	3	1	2	18	12	+6	10	Advance to knockout stage	—	1–2	2–2	2–3
2	Perak	6	3	1	2	9	7	+2	10	Advance to knockout stage	3–4	—	0–0	1–0
3	Felcra	6	2	2	2	10	14	−4	8		1–4	2–1	—	1–4
4	Kuala Lumpur	6	2	0	4	11	15	−4	6		1–5	0–2	3–4	—

Updated to match(es) played on 15 September 2018. Source: FAM FMLLP

4 August 2018 1	Kuala Lumpur	1–5	Terengganu	Cheras
21:00 MYT	Hafiz (yellow card) 38'; Azmeer (yellow card) 43'; Zaquan 85' (pen.)	Report	Kipré 25', 55', 72'; Tuck 44'; Zonjić 64'; Thierry Bin (yellow card) 81'	Stadium: KLFA Stadium; Referee: Razlan Jeffri Ali

11 August 2018 2	Perak	3–4	Terengganu	Ipoh
21:00 MYT	Leandro (yellow card) 33', (goal) 90+5' (pen.); Brendan (yellow card) 57'; Wander 86', 90'	Report	Ashari 8'; Tuck (yellow card) 32' (red card) 71', (goal) 45+5' (pen.); Amirzafran (yellow card) 51', (goal) 57'; Faiz 82'	Stadium: Perak Stadium

18 August 2018 3	Terengganu	2–2	Felcra	Kuala Terengganu
21:00 MYT	Ashari 21', 46'; Zonjić (yellow card) 53'; Adib (yellow card) 56'; Amirzafran (yellow card) 60'	Report	Alif 60', (yellow card) 76'; Casagrande (yellow card) 70'; Azim 90'	Stadium: Sultan Ismail Nasiruddin Shah Stadium; Referee: Nazmi Nasaruddin

25 August 2018 4	Felcra	1–4	Terengganu	KLFA Stadium, Cheras
21:00 UTC+8	David Laly 3'	Report	Kipré 18'; Tuck 22', 61' (pen.), 79'	Referee: Fairuzi Mat Desa

2 September 2018 5	Terengganu	1–2	Perak	Sultan Ismail Nasiruddin Shah Stadium, Kuala Terengganu
21:00 UTC+8	Ashari Samsudin 65'	Report	Gilmar 21', 87'	Referee: Mohd Nafeez Abd Wahab

15 September 2018 6	Terengganu	2–3	Kuala Lumpur	Sultan Ismail Nasiruddin Shah Stadium, Kuala Terengganu
21:00 UTC+8	Do 34'; Aizad 66'	Report	Guilherme 4', 37'; Paulo Josué 37'	Referee: Suresh Jayaraman

==== Knock-stage ====
===== Quarter-finals =====
21 September 2018 First leg	Felda United	1–2	Terengganu	Tun Abdul Razak Stadium, Jengka
21:00 UTC+8	Gilberto 56'	Report	Haniff 9'; Lee Tuck 81' (pen.)	Referee: Mohd Amirul Izwan Yaacob

28 September 2018 Second leg	Terengganu	4–3	Felda United	Sultan Ismail Nasiruddin Shah Stadium, Kuala Terengganu
21:00 UTC+8	Lee Tuck 57'; Adib Aizuddin 69'; Malik Ariff 83'; Kipré Tchétché 87'	Report	Thiago Junio 12'; Syamim Yahya 49'; Gilberto Fortunato 79'	Referee: Suresh Jayaraman

===== Semi-finals =====
6 October 2018 First leg	Terengganu	1–0	Johor Darul Ta'zim	Sultan Ismail Nasiruddin Shah Stadium, Kuala Terengganu
21:00 UTC+8	Malik Ariff 78'	Report		Referee: Zulkarnain Zakaria

20 October 2018 Second leg	Johor Darul Ta'zim	2-2	Terengganu	Tan Sri Dato' Haji Hassan Yunos Stadium, Larkin
21:00 UTC+8	Fernando Márquez 41' (pen.); Cabrera 62'	Report	Kipré Tchétché 69', 90+2'	Referee: Nazmi Nasaruddin

===== Finals =====
27 October 2018 Final	Terengganu	3-3 (1–4 p)	Perak	Shah Alam Stadium, Shah Alam
21:00 UTC+8	Kipré Tchétché 1', 42'; Igor Zonjić (yellow card) 59'; Lee Tuck (yellow card) 37' (yellow-red card) 66'; Faiz Nasir 96'	Report	Wander Luiz (yellow card) 35'; Firdaus Saiyadi 47'; Gilmar (red card) 56'; Brendan Gan 90+1'; Igor Zonjić 120+1' (o.g.); Leandro (yellow card) 120+1'	Attendance: 75,000; Referee: Suresh Jayaraman
	Penalties
	Igor Zonjić (penalty missed); Thierry Bin (penalty missed); Nasrullah Haniff (penalty scored)		(penalty scored) Wander Luiz; (penalty scored) Amirul Azhan; (penalty scored) Shahrul Saad; (penalty scored) Leandro

== Statistics ==
=== Appearances and goals ===
No.	Pos.	Name	League		FA Cup		League Cup		Total		Discipline	
No.	Pos.	Name	Apps	Goals	Apps	Goals	Apps	Goals	Apps	Goals	Yellow card	Red card
1	GK	(Malaysia) Faizal Yusoff	0	0	0	0	0	0	0	0	0	0
2	CB	(Malaysia) Wan Amirzafran	1(2)	0	0(1)	0	6	1	7(3)	1	2	0
3	LB	(Malaysia) Fitri Omar	11(2)	0	1	0	2(1)	0	14(3)	0	4	0
4	RB	(Malaysia) Kamal Azizi	20(1)	2	2	0	10(1)	0	32(2)	2	3	0
5	CB	(Malaysia) Radhi Yusof	0	0	0	0	1(1)	0	1(1)	0	0	0
7	MF	(England) Lee Tuck	20	6	2	1	10	7	32	14	9	2
8	MF	(Cambodia) Thierry Bin	20	0	2	0	10	0	32	0	3	0
10	FW	(Singapore) Faris Ramli	11(3)	1	2	0	1(5)	1	14(8)	2	1	0
12	RM	(Malaysia) Shahrul Aizad	7(1)	1	2	2	10(1)	1	19(2)	4	1	0
13	MF	(Malaysia) Latiff Suhaimi	6(7)	1	0	0	3	0	9(7)	1	2	0
15	AM	(Malaysia) Faiz Nasir	9(10)	1	0(2)	0	3(6)	2	12(18)	3	0	0
16	RM	(Malaysia) J. Partiban	19(1)	1	0(1)	0	10	0	29(2)	1	1	0
17	CB	(Malaysia) Nasrullah Haniff	18	0	2	0	2(5)	1	22(5)	1	5	0
18	LM	(Malaysia) Fauzi Kadar	0(7)	0	0	0	0(4)	0	0(11)	0	0	0
19	FW	(South Korea) Do Dong-Hyun	8(1)	0	0	0	1(1)	1	9(2)	1	0	0
21	GK	(Malaysia) Syazwan Yusoff	2	0	0	0	0	0	2	0	0	0
22	LB	(Malaysia) Adib Aizuddin	13(2)	0	1	0	9	1	22(2)	1	3	0
23	FW	(Ivory Coast) Kipré Tchétché (c)	20	14	2	1	11	9	33	24	1	0
24	CB	(Serbia) Igor Zonjić	20	1	2	1	10(1)	1	32(1)	4	3	0
25	MF	(Malaysia) Azi Shahril	0	0	0	0	0	0	0	0	0	0
26	RB	(Malaysia) Hasnizaidi Jamian	1	0	0(1)	0	1	0	2(1)	0	0	0
27	GK	(Malaysia) Wan Azraie	5	0	0	0	0	0	5	0	1	0
29	GK	(Malaysia) Suffian Rahman	15	0	2	0	11	0	28	0	2	0
30	FW	(Malaysia) Ashari Samsudin	5(13)	2	2	0	8(2)	4	15(15)	6	0	0
41	LM	(Malaysia) Haidhir Suhaini ‡	2(2)	0	0	0	0	0	2(2)	0	0	0
42	MF	(Malaysia) Alif Fitri	0	0	0	0	0	0	0	0	0	0
43	DF	(Malaysia) Hafizal Mohamad ‡	1	0	0	0	0	0	1	0	0	0
44	MF	(Malaysia) Fazirhikwan Rani ‡	0(1)	0	0	0	1(2)	0	1(3)	0	1	1
Left club during season
—	FW	(Japan) Bruno Suzuki	8	0	0	0	0	0	8	0	0	0
—	FW	(South Korea) Lee Jun-hyeob	0(4)	1	0	0	0	0	0(4)	1	0	0
—	FW	(Nigeria) Akanni-Sunday Wasiu	2	0	0	0	0	0	2	0	0	0

^{‡} Players who played for both Terengganu I and Terengganu II.

Last updated: 27 October 2018.
Source: Soccerway

=== Clean sheets ===
Rnk	No.	Player	League	FA Cup	League Cup	Total
1	27	(Malaysia) Wan Azraie	3	0	0	3
2	29	(Malaysia) Suffian Rahman	1	1	0	2
3	21	(Malaysia) Syazwan Yusoff	1	0	0	1
