= 2016 T-Team F.C. season =

T–Team
2016 season
- Chairman: Mazlan Ngah
- Head coach: Rahmad Darmawan
- Ground: Sultan Ismail Nasiruddin Shah Stadium (Capacity: 15,000)
- Liga Super: 7th
- Piala FA: Second round
- Piala Malaysia: Semi-finals
- Top goalscorer: League: Patrick Cruz (10 goals); All: Patrick Cruz (13 goals)

The 2016 season was T–Team's 5th season in Liga Super since being promoted.

== Squad ==
=== First-team squad ===
As of 9 February 2016

Note: Flags indicate national team as defined under FIFA eligibility rules; some limited exceptions apply. Players may hold more than one non-FIFA nationality.

No.	Pos.	Nation	Player
1	GK	MAS	Izzuddin Hussin
2	DF	MAS	Wan Ahmad Amirzafran
3	DF	MLI	Abdoulaye Maïga
4	DF	MAS	Kamal Azizi
5	DF	MAS	Hasbullah Awang (captain)
6	DF	MAS	Radhi Yusof
7	DF	MAS	Hassan Basri
8	MF	MAS	Badrul Hisham
10	MF	MLI	Makan Konaté
11	FW	BRA	Patrick Cruz
12	MF	MAS	Naim Zakaria
13	MF	MAS	Asrol Ibrahim
14	FW	MAS	Izzaq Faris
15	MF	MAS	Takhiyuddin Roslan
16	DF	MAS	Syuhiran Zainal

No.	Pos.	Nation	Player
17	DF	MAS	Marzuki Yusof
18	MF	MAS	Nor Hakim Hassan
19	FW	MAS	Ramzi Sufian
20	MF	MAS	Shamsul Kamal
21	MF	MAS	Azrul Hazran
22	FW	MAS	Ramzul Zahini
23	GK	MAS	Ilham Amirullah
24	DF	MAS	Abdullah Suleiman
26	MF	MAS	Zulhanizam Shafine
27	GK	MAS	Wan Azraie
29	MF	MAS	Akhir Bahari
30	FW	UZB	Dilshod Sharofetdinov
31	MF	MAS	Zarulizwan Mazlan
34	DF	MAS	Arif Fadzilah
37	FW	MAS	Safawi Rasid

== Transfers ==
=== 1st leg ===
In: Note: Flags indicate national team as defined under FIFA eligibility rules; some limited exceptions apply. Players may hold more than one non-FIFA nationality.

No.	Pos.	Nation	Player
2	DF	MAS	Wan Ahmad Amirzafran (from Harimau Muda A)
3	DF	MLI	Abdoulaye Maïga (from (Indonesia) Sriwijaya)
6	DF	MAS	Radhi Yusof (from Terengganu)
10	MF	MLI	Makan Konaté (from (Indonesia) Persib Bandung)
11	FW	BRA	Patrick Cruz (from (Indonesia) Mitra Kukar)
12	MF	MAS	Naim Zakaria (from Harimau Muda A)
19	FW	MAS	Ramzi Sufian (from Harimau Muda A)
23	GK	MAS	Ilham Amirullah (from Harimau Muda A)
24	DF	MAS	Abdullah Suleiman (from Terengganu)
26	MF	MAS	Zulhanizam Shafine (from T-Team youth)
29	MF	MAS	Akhir Bahari (from Harimau Muda A)
30	FW	UZB	Dilshod Sharofetdinov (from Sime Darby)
31	MF	MAS	Zarulizwan Mazlan (from T-Team youth)

Out: Note: Flags indicate national team as defined under FIFA eligibility rules; some limited exceptions apply. Players may hold more than one non-FIFA nationality.

No.	Pos.	Nation	Player
—	MF	MAS	Azmi Hamzah (to DRB-HICOM)
—	MF	MAS	Rosdi Zakaria (to Kuala Lumpur)
—	DF	MAS	Nik Zul Aziz (to Kuala Lumpur)
—	DF	MAS	Faizal Muhammad (to PDRM)
—	GK	MAS	Shahril Saa'ri (to Sarawak)
—	DF	CRO	Josip Milardović (to (Croatia) NK Đakovo)
—	FW	CRO	Tomislav Bušić (to (Albania) Flamurtari Vlorë)
—	FW	UZB	Farhod Tadjiyev (to (Uzbekistan) Olmaliq FK)
—	MF	UZB	Sadriddin Abdullaev (to (Uzbekistan) Lokomotiv Tashkent FK)
—	FW	MAS	Faizuddin Manjur (released)
—	DF	MAS	Nuraliff Zainal Abidin (released)
—	FW	MAS	Syam Sharil Ghulam (to Terengganu City)

=== 2nd leg ===
Out: Note: Flags indicate national team as defined under FIFA eligibility rules; some limited exceptions apply. Players may hold more than one non-FIFA nationality.

No.	Pos.	Nation	Player
6	DF	MAS	Radhi Yusof (to Terengganu)

== Competitions ==
=== Liga Super ===
==== League table ====
Pos	Team	Pld	W	D	L	GF	GA	GD	Pts
5	Selangor	22	7	7	8	28	27	+1	28
6	Perak	22	7	7	8	29	30	−1	28
7	T–Team	22	7	6	9	30	34	−4	27
8	Sarawak	22	6	6	10	32	40	−8	24
9	Pahang	22	5	6	11	22	41	−19	24 (Note: Pahang has been awarded 3 points free from the Football Association of Malaysia (FAM) after offenses committed by the Football Association of Kedah (Kedah FA) putting the suspended player during the match against Pahang on August 3, 2016.)

Source: SPMB Football Association of Malaysia, Football Malaysia LLP
Rules for classification: 1) Points; 2) Goal difference; 3) Number of goals scored; 3) Number of goals against.
