= Radhi =

Radhi may refer to:

== Given name ==
- Radhi Jaïdi (born 1975), Tunisian footballer and coach
- Radhi Jazi (1927–2020), Tunisian pharmacist
- Radhi Al-Mutairi (born 1991), Saudi footballer
- Radhi Al-Otaibi (born 1999), Saudi footballer
- Radhi Shenaishil (born 1966), Iraqi footballer
- Radhi Al-Radhi (born 1991), Saudi footballer
- Radhi Hamza al-Radhi, Iraqi lawyer
- Radhi Yusof (born 1993), Malaysian footballer

== Places ==
- Radhi, Bhutan, a village in Trashigang district, eastern Bhutan
- Radhi, Mauritania, a village and rural commune
