= Shahrul =

Shahrul is a Malaysian given name and may refer to:

- Shahrul Aizad (born 1993), a.k.a. Cotang, Malaysian professional footballer
- Mohd Shahrul Mat Amin (born 1989), Malaysian cyclist
- Shahrul Igwan (born 1994), Malaysian footballer for Kelantan
- Shahrul Nizam Mustapa (born 1981), a.k.a. Arul, Malaysian former footballer
- Sharul Nizam Nadzir (born 1996), Malaysian footballer
- Shahrul Nizam (born 1998), Malaysian professional footballer
- Shahrul Saad (born 1993), Malaysian professional footballer
- Nik Shahrul (born 1990), Malaysian professional footballer
- Ahmad Shahrul Azhar Sofian (born 1974), Malaysian former footballer
- Shahrul Azhar Ture (born 1985), Malaysian footballer
- Shahrul Zaman Yahya, Malaysian politician, member of the Perak State Executive Council
