= Takhiyuddin Roslan =

Malaysian footballer

Takhiyuddin
Personal information
- Full name: Ahmad Takhiyuddin bin Roslan
- Date of birth: 13 May 1993 (age 33)
- Place of birth: Paka, Malaysia
- Height: 1.78 m (5 ft 10 in)
- Position: Attacking midfielder

Team information
- Current team: Terengganu II
- Number: 15

Youth career
- 2013–2014: T–Team

Senior career*
Years	Team	Apps	(Gls)
2015–	Terengganu II	46	(4)
- * Club domestic league appearances and goals as of 2 February 2018

Ahmad Takhiyuddin bin Roslan (born 13 May 1993) is a Malaysian footballer who plays for Terengganu II as an attacking midfielder.

== Career statistics ==
=== Club ===
As of 13 July 2018

Club	Season	League		Cup		League Cup		Continental		Total	
Club	Season	Apps	Goals	Apps	Goals	Apps	Goals	Apps	Goals	Apps	Goals
Terengganu II	2012	0	0	0	0	0	0	–	–	0	0
Terengganu II	2013	0	3	0	0	0	0	–	–	0	0
Terengganu II	2014	0	0	0	0	0	0	–	–	0	0
Terengganu II	2015	0	0	0	0	0	0	–	–	0	0
Terengganu II	2016	20	1	0	0	0	0	–	–	0	0
Terengganu II	2017	9	0	1	0	2	0	–	–	12	0
Terengganu II	2018	5	0	–	–	0	0	–	–	5	0
Terengganu II	Total	0	0	0	0	0	0	0	0	0	0
Career total		0	0	0	0	0	0	0	0	0	0
