= Kipré Tchétché =

Malaysian footballer

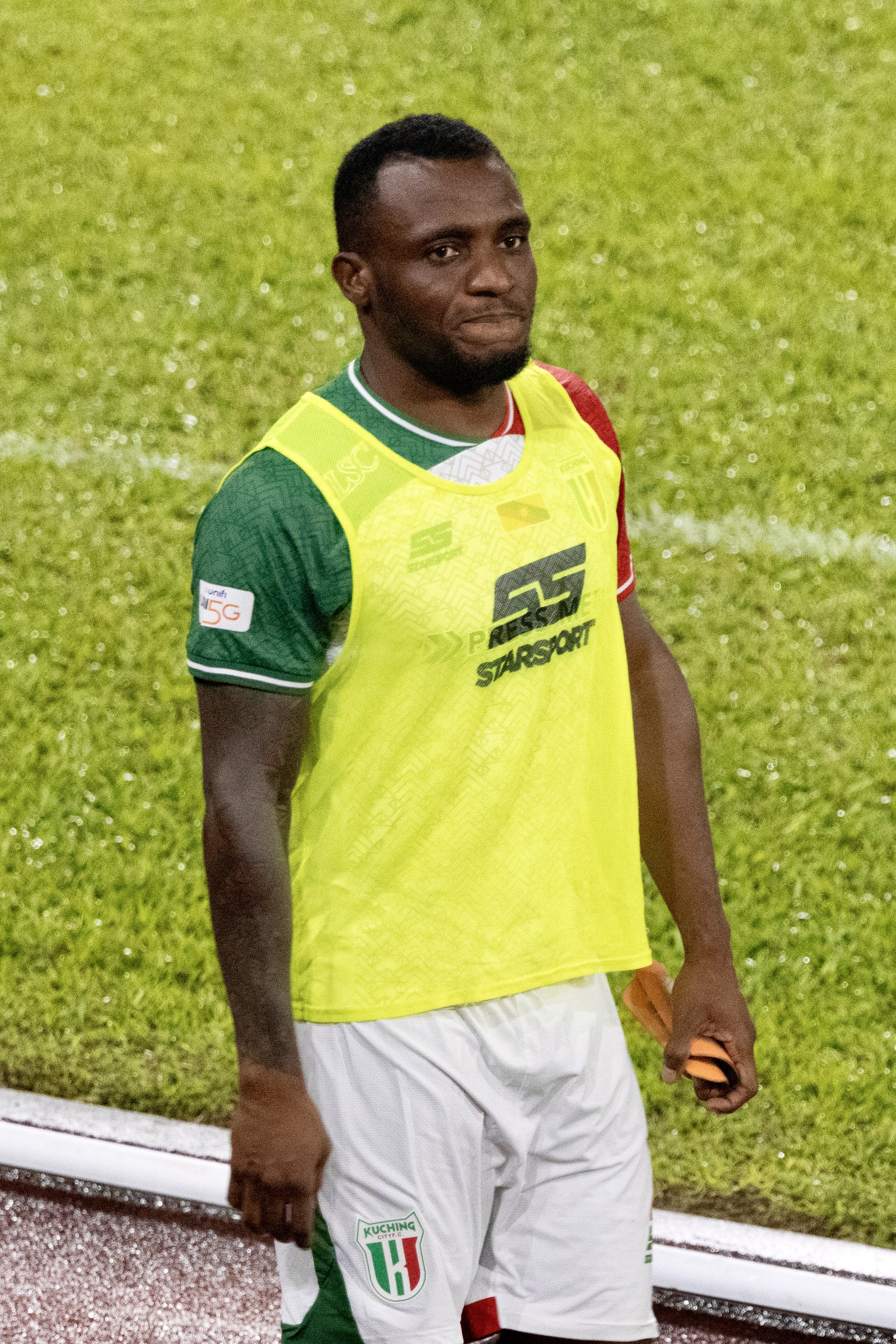
- Tchétché with Kuching City in 2025

Personal information
- Full name: Tchétché Hermann Brice Kipré
- Date of birth: 16 December 1987 (age 38)
- Place of birth: Bouaflé, Ivory Coast
- Height: 1.69 m (5 ft 7 in)
- Position: Forward

Team information
- Current team: Negeri Sembilan

Senior career*
| Years | Team | Apps | (Gls) |
| 2008–2011 | Jeunesse | | |
| 2011–2016 | Azam | 63 | (47) |
| 2016–2017 | Al-Suwaiq | 9 | (5) |
| 2017–2019 | Terengganu | 42 | (20) |
| 2020–2021 | Kedah Darul Aman | 32 | (17) |
| 2022 | Terengganu | 14 | (13) |
| 2023 | Kuala Lumpur City | 23 | (8) |
| 2024–2025 | Kuching City | 20 | (4) |
| 2025–2026 | Penang | 19 | (7) |
| 2026– | Negeri Sembilan | 0 | (0) |
- * Club domestic league appearances and goals as of 3 May 2026

Tchétché Hermann Brice Kipré (born 16 December 1987) is a professional footballer who plays as a forward for Malaysia Super League club Negeri Sembilan. Born in the Ivory Coast, he represents Malaysia at international level.

== Career ==
=== Kedah FA ===
On 21 January 2020, Kipré Tchétché scored a hat-trick for Kedah Darul Aman against Hong Kong club Tai Po in the 2020 AFC Champions League preliminary round 2 match, helping his club to win 5-1 and progress to the next round.

=== Penang ===
On 9 June 2025, Kipré Tchétché signed for Malaysia Super League club Penang from Kuching City on a free transfer.

== Career statistics ==
As of 15 October 2022

=== Club ===
| Club | Season | League | | Cup | | League Cup | | Continental | | Total | |
| Club | Season | Apps | Goals | Apps | Goals | Apps | Goals | Apps | Goals | Apps | Goals |
|---|---|---|---|---|---|---|---|---|---|---|---|
| Terengganu | 2017 | 9 | 9 | 1 | 0 | 5 | 3 | – | | 15 | 12 |
| Terengganu | 2018 | 20 | 14 | 2 | 1 | 10 | 7 | – | | 32 | 22 |
| Terengganu | 2019 | 22 | 6 | 3 | 2 | 8 | 6 | – | | 33 | 14 |
| Terengganu | Total | 51 | 29 | 6 | 3 | 23 | 16 | 0 | 0 | 80 | 48 |
| Kedah Darul Aman | 2020 | 11 | 7 | 0 | 0 | 1 | 1 | 2 | 3 | 14 | 11 |
| Kedah Darul Aman | 2021 | 21 | 10 | 0 | 0 | 5 | 1 | 0 | 0 | 26 | 11 |
| Kedah Darul Aman | Total | 32 | 17 | 0 | 0 | 6 | 2 | 2 | 3 | 40 | 22 |
| Terengganu | 2022 | 14 | 13 | 4 | 3 | 6 | 3 | – | | 24 | 19 |
| Terengganu | Total | 14 | 13 | 4 | 3 | 6 | 3 | – | | 24 | 19 |
| Kuala Lumpur City | 2023 | 23 | 8 | 2 | 0 | 5 | 3 | – | | 30 | 11 |
| Kuala Lumpur City | Total | 23 | 8 | 2 | 0 | 5 | 3 | 0 | 0 | 30 | 11 |
| Kuching City | 2024–25 | 20 | 4 | 1 | 0 | 0 | 0 | – | | 0 | 00 |
| Kuching City | Total | 20 | 4 | 1 | 0 | 0 | 0 | 0 | 0 | 0 | 0 |
| Penang | 2025–26 | 11 | 6 | 0 | 0 | 4 | 1 | 0 | 0 | 15 | 7 |
| Penang | Total | 11 | 6 | 0 | 0 | 4 | 1 | 0 | 0 | 15 | 7 |
| Career total | | 97 | 59 | 10 | 5 | 29 | 18 | 2 | 3 | 138 | 85 |

== Honours ==
=== Club ===
Al-Suwaiq

- Sultan Qaboos Cup: 2016-17

Terengganu

- Malaysia Super League: Runner up : 2022
- Malaysia FA Cup: Runner up : 2022
- Malaysia Cup: Runner up : 2018

Kuala Lumpur City

- Malaysia FA Cup: Runner up : 2023

Penang

- MFL Challenge Cup runner-up: 2026
