= Hafizal Mohamad =

Malaysian footballer

Personal information
- Full name: Muhamad Hafizal bin Mohamad Alias
- Date of birth: 21 January 1993 (age 33)
- Place of birth: Terengganu, Malaysia
- Height: 1.76 m (5 ft 9 in)
- Position: Defender

Team information
- Current team: Kelantan Darul Naim
- Number: 29

Youth career
- 2012: Harimau Muda B
- 2013–2014: Terengganu

Senior career*
Years	Team	Apps	(Gls)
2015–2022	Terengganu	55	(0)
2018	→ Terengganu II (loan)	14	(0)
2022	→ Terengganu II (loan)	6	(0)
2023	Perak	14	(0)
2024–	Kelantan Darul Naim	13	(0)
- * Club domestic league appearances and goals as of 23:14, 26 February 2025 (UTC)

Muhamad Hafizal bin Mohamad Alias (born 21 January 1993) is a Malaysian professional footballer who plays for Malaysia Super League club Kelantan Darul Naim.

== Career statistics ==
=== Club ===
As of match played 26 February 2025

Club	Season	League			Cup		League Cup		Continental		Total	
Club	Season	Division	Apps	Goals	Apps	Goals	Apps	Goals	Apps	Goals	Apps	Goals
Terengganu	2015	Malaysia Super League	8	0	2	0	5	0	–	–	15	0
Terengganu	2016	Malaysia Super League	12	0	0	0	0	0	–	–	12	0
Terengganu	2017	Malaysia Premier League	8	0	3	0	4	0	–	–	15	0
Terengganu	2018	Malaysia Super League	1	0	0	0	0	0	–	–	1	0
Terengganu	2019	Malaysia Super League	4	0	0	0	1	0	–	–	5	0
Terengganu	2020	Malaysia Super League	9	0	–	–	–	–	–	–	9	0
Terengganu	2021	Malaysia Super League	7	0	0	0	3	0	–	–	10	0
Terengganu	2022	Malaysia Super League	6	0	0	0	3	0	–	–	9	0
Terengganu	Total		55	0	5	0	16	0	0	0	76	0
Perak	2023	Malaysia Super League	14	0	1	0	0	0	–	–	15	0
Perak	Total		14	0	1	0	0	0	0	0	15	0
Kelantan Darul Naim	2024–25	Malaysia Super League	13	0	0	0	1	0	–	–	14	0
Kelantan Darul Naim	Total		13	0	0	0	1	0	0	0	14	0
Career total			56	0	5	0	16	0	0	0	77	0

== Honours ==
Terengganu

- Malaysia Super League runner-up: 2022
- Malaysia Cup runner-up: 2018
- Malaysia Premier League runner-up: 2017
