= Malik Ariff =

Malaysian footballer

Personal information
- Full name: Abdul Malik bin Mat Ariff
- Date of birth: 7 January 1991 (age 35)
- Place of birth: Beserah, Malaysia
- Height: 1.64 m (5 ft 4 1/2 in)
- Positions: Forward; winger

Youth career
- 2010–2012: Pahang

Senior career*
Years	Team	Apps	(Gls)
2011–2014	Pahang	34	(4)
2015–2017	Kuantan	66	(28)
2018–2019	Terengganu	28	(3)
2021–2023	Sri Pahang	28	(5)
- * Club domestic league appearances and goals as of 1 September 2022

Abdul Malik bin Mat Ariff (Malay: عبد المالك بن محمد عريف; born 7 January 1991), commonly known as Malik Ariff is a Malaysian footballer who plays as a winger or forward.

== Career statistics ==
=== Club ===
As of match played 1 September 2021

Club	Season	League		Cup		League Cup		Continental		Total	
Club	Season	Apps	Goals	Apps	Goals	Apps	Goals	Apps	Goals	Apps	Goals
Kuantan	2015	0	3	0	0	0	0	0	–	–	3
Kuantan	2016	0	10	0	1	0	0	0	–	–	11
Kuantan	2017	22	15	2	3	–	–	–	–	24	18
Kuantan	Total	66	28	0	4	0	0	0	0	0	32
Terengganu	2018	15	2	2	0	–	–	–	–	17	2
Terengganu	2019	13	2	3	1	–	–	–	–	16	2
Terengganu	Total	28	4	5	1	0	0	0	0	33	5
Sri Pahang	2021	12	2	0	0	–	–	–	–	12	2
Sri Pahang	Total	12	2	0	0	0	0	0	0	12	2
Career total		0	0	0	0	0	0	0	0	0	0

== Honours ==
=== Club ===
Pahang

- Malaysia Cup (2): 2013, 2014
- FA Cup (1): 2014
- Malaysian Charity Shield (1): 2014
- Piala Emas Raja-Raja (1): 2011
- Top Scorer for President Cup 2012: Winner
