= Wan Amirzafran =

Malaysian footballer (born 1994)

Personal information
- Full name: Wan Ahmad Amirzafran bin Wan Nadris @ Wan Nazli
- Date of birth: 20 December 1994 (age 31)
- Place of birth: Terengganu, Malaysia
- Height: 1.85 m (6 ft 1 in)
- Position: Centre-back

Team information
- Current team: Sri Pahang
- Number: 2

Youth career
- 2011: Terengganu

Senior career*
Years	Team	Apps	(Gls)
2012–2015	Harimau Muda B	9	(0)
2015	Harimau Muda	12	(0)
2016–2017	T-Team	25	(1)
2018–2020	Terengganu	11	(0)
2021–	Kuala Lumpur City	2	(0)
2022–	Sri Pahang	0	(0)
- * Club domestic league appearances and goals as of 14:36, 8 May 2021 (UTC)

Wan Ahmad Amirzafran bin Wan Nadris @ Wan Nazli (born 20 December 1994) is a Malaysian professional footballer who plays for Malaysia Super League club Sri Pahang as a centre-back.

== Career statistics ==
=== Club ===
As of 5 June 2022

Appearances and goals by club, season and competition
Club	Season	League			Cup (Note: Malaysia FA Cup)		League Cup (Note: Malaysia Cup and Singapore Cup)		Continental		Total	
Club	Season	Division	Apps	Goals	Apps	Goals	Apps	Goals	Apps	Goals	Apps	Goals
Harimau Muda B	2012	S.League	4	0	0	0	0	0	–		4	0
Harimau Muda B	2013	S.League	5	0	0	0	0	0	–		5	0
Harimau Muda B	Total		9	0	0	0	0	0	–		9	0
Harimau Muda	2015	S.League	12	0	0	0	0	0	–		0	0
Harimau Muda	Total		12	0	0	0	0	0	–		12	0
T-Team	2016	Malaysia Super League	9	0	0	0	0	0	–		9	0
T-Team	2017	Malaysia Super League	16	1	1	0	4	1	–		21	2
T-Team	Total		25	1	1	0	4	1	–		30	2
Terengganu	2018	Malaysia Super League	3	0	1	0	6	1	–		10	1
Terengganu	2019	Malaysia Super League	8	0	0	0	0	0	–		8	0
Terengganu	2020	Malaysia Super League	0	0	0	0	0	0	–		0	0
Terengganu	Total		11	0	1	0	6	1	–	–	18	1
Kuala Lumpur City	2021	Malaysia Super League	2	0	0	0	2	0	–		4	0
Kuala Lumpur City	Total		2	0	0	0	2	0	–	–	4	0
Sri Pahang	2022	Malaysia Super League	0	0	0	0	0	0	–		0	0
Sri Pahang	Total		0	0	0	0	0	0	–	–	0	0
Career total			59	1	2	0	12	0	–	–	73	3

== Honours ==
=== Club ===
KL City FC

- Malaysia Cup: 2021

Terengganu

- Malaysia Cup runner-up: 2018
