= Kamal Azizi =

Malaysian footballer

Personal information
- Full name: Muhammad Kamal Azizi bin Mohamad Zabri
- Date of birth: 28 August 1993 (age 33)
- Place of birth: Ajil, Kuala Berang, Malaysia
- Height: 1.72 m (5 ft 7 1/2 in)
- Position: Right-back

Team information
- Current team: Kuala Lumpur City
- Number: 4

Youth career
- 2014: T–Team U21

Senior career*
Years	Team	Apps	(Gls)
2014–2017	T–Team	40	(0)
2018–2020	Terengganu	40	(3)
2021–	Kuala Lumpur City	86	(1)
- * Club domestic league appearances and goals as of 22 September 2025

Muhammad Kamal Azizi bin Mohamad Zabri (born 28 August 1993) is a Malaysian footballer who plays for Kuala Lumpur City as a right-back.

== Club career ==
=== Terengganu ===
On 24 November 2017, Kamal signed a contract with Terengganu.

=== Kuala Lumpur City ===
Kamal joined Kuala Lumpur City at the start of the 2021 season and was part of the team that won the 2021 Malaysia Cup.

== Career statistics ==
=== Club ===
As of match played 22 September 2025

Appearances and goals by club, season and competition
Club	Season	League			Cup (Note: Malaysia FA Cup)		League Cup (Note: Malaysia Cup)		Continental		Other (Note: Piala Sumbangsih)/ (Note: Promotion playoff)		Total	
Club	Season	Division	Apps	Goals	Apps	Goals	Apps	Goals	Apps	Goals	Apps	Goals	Apps	Goals
T–Team	2014	Malaysia Super League	0	0	0	0	2	0	–		0	0	2	0
T–Team	2015	Malaysia Premier League	2	0	1	0	0	0	–		0	0	3	0
T–Team	2016	Malaysia Super League	18	0	1	0	7	0	–		1	0	27	0
T–Team	2017	Malaysia Super League	20	0	2	0	4	0	–		0	0	26	0
T–Team	Total		40	0	4	0	13	0	–		1	0	58	0
Terengganu	2018	Malaysia Super League	20	2	2	0	11	0	–		0	0	33	2
Terengganu	2019	Malaysia Super League	20	1	3	0	2	0	–		0	0	25	1
Terengganu	2020	Malaysia Super League	0	0	0	0	0	0	–		0	0	0	0
Terengganu	Total		40	3	5	0	13	0	–		0	0	58	3
Kuala Lumpur City	2021	Malaysia Super League	12	0	0	0	11	0	–		0	0	23	0
Kuala Lumpur City	2022	Malaysia Super League	21	0	1	0	4	0	7	0	1	0	34	0
Kuala Lumpur City	2023	Malaysia Super League	26	0	3	0	6	0	–		0	0	35	0
Kuala Lumpur City	2024–25	Malaysia Super League	22	0	0	0	3	0	4	0	0	0	29	0
Kuala Lumpur City	2025–26	Malaysia Super League	5	1	2	0	0	0	0	0	0	0	7	1
Kuala Lumpur City	Total		86	1	6	0	24	0	11	0	1	0	128	0
Career total			166	4	15	0	50	0	11	0	2	0	244	4

== Honours ==
Terengganu

- Malaysia Cup runner-up: 2018

Kuala Lumpur City

- Malaysia Cup: 2021
- AFC Cup runner-up: 2022
- Malaysian FA Cup runner-up: 2023
