= Commission of Integrity (Iraq) =

Iraqi Corruption Investigation Department

Republic of Iraq Commission of Integrity
- هيئة النزاهة
- Coat of arms of Iraq

Agency overview
- Headquarters: Baghdad (Iraq)
- Agency executive: Mohammed Ali al-Lami, Chairman
- Website: https://www.nazaha.iq/

The Iraqi Commission of Integrity (Arabic: هيئة النزاهة; CoI), formerly known as the Commission on Public Integrity (CPI), is an independent commission within the government of Iraq tasked with preventing and investigating corruption at all levels of the Iraqi government nationwide. It is the coordinating umbrella organization for the other two pillars (The Board of Supreme Audit and the Inspectors General) of the national strategic anti-corruption campaign. The CoI seeks to promote and advance open, honest and accountable government through public education and awareness programs allowing citizens to report corruption through anonymous means.

CoI works closely with the Inspectors General (IGs) of each Ministry and with the Board of Supreme Audit (BSA) to coordinate anti-corruption efforts. The CoI is also working with Ministry of Education officials to implement curricular materials in ethics and civics in public schools. Mohammed Ali al-Lami is the current chairman. He took office in 23 October 2024.

== History ==
The commission was originally created on January 31, 2004, by the Iraqi Governing Council as authorized by the Coalition Provisional Authority's order 55, and was subsequently incorporated into the 2005 Constitution of Iraq.

Judge Radhi Hamza al-Radhi was selected by U.S. Ambassador Paul Bremer as the first Commissioner from a list of three candidates chosen by the old Judicial Council. On September 6, 2007, he announced his resignation, citing political pressure from the government of Prime Minister Nuri Kamal al-Maliki and anonymous death threats, and deputy commissioner Moussa Faraj was named to replace him. Stuart Bowen, who serves as Special Inspector General for Iraq Reconstruction, was quoted as saying Radhi's departure was "a real blow to anti-corruption efforts in Iraq", and that Rahdi had asked Bowen for help in fleeing Iraq.

On October 4, 2007, al-Radhi appeared before the U.S. House Committee on Oversight and Government Reform and accused the government of Prime Minister Nuri Kamal al-Maliki of protecting corrupt employees and of actively attempting to "eradicate or control the Commission" and refusing to recognize the independence of the Commission on Public Integrity in violation of the Iraqi Constitution. The government responded by announcing they would sue al-Radhi for smuggling official documents, defaming the prime minister, and corruption. He later was granted asylum in the United States in July 2008.

On 19 October 2009, the Commission on Integrity published its annual report for the year 2008.
