= Faiz Nasir =

Malaysian footballer

Personal information
- Birth name: Muhammad Faiz bin Mohd Nasir
- Date of birth: 21 July 1992 (age 34)
- Place of birth: Pasir Mas, Kelantan, Malaysia
- Height: 1.56 m (5 ft 1 in)
- Position: Winger

Team information
- Current team: Kelantan Red Warrior
- Number: 18

Youth career
- 2012–2013: PBJ Pasir Mas
- 2013: Kelantan

Senior career*
Years	Team	Apps	(Gls)
2014–2015	PBAPP	20	(4)
2016	Felcra	15	(5)
2017–2018	Terengganu	37	(6)
2019	Selangor	18	(1)
2020–2022	Terengganu	41	(3)
2022	Terengganu II	3	(1)
2023	→ Kelantan United (loan)	6	(1)
2024	→ Kedah (loan)	7	(0)
2025–	Kelantan Red Warrior	1	(0)

International career^{‡}
2019–	Malaysia	3	(2)
- * Club domestic league appearances and goals as of 22 August 2025 ‡ National team caps and goals as of 11 June 2019

Muhammad Faiz bin Mohd Nasir (born 21 July 1992) is a Malaysian professional footballer who plays as a winger for Malaysia A1 Semi-Pro League club Kelantan Red Warrior.

== Early life ==
Faiz was born and raised in Pasir Mas, Kelantan. He is the sixth of eleven siblings. He received his primary and secondary education in Kelantan, Sekolah Menengah Kebangsaan Tiang Chandi.

== Club career ==
Faiz began his football career playing for the Kelantan youth team in 2013. In 2014, Faiz signed with FAM League club PBAPP. He played for two seasons with PBAPP before deciding to leave the club for Felcra and signed one-year contract with the team.

== International ==
In March 2019, Faiz received his first call-up to the Malaysia national football team. He made his international debut when he came on a first eleven in a 2–1 2019 Airmarine Cup win with Afghanistan. In that match, a stunning strike out from the box led to his first goal of the tournament and national team.

In June 2019, Faiz was named in the 23-man for the FIFA World Cup Qualifier against Timor-Leste, and he scored a goal in the 7–1 victory.

== Career statistics ==
=== Club ===
As of match played 9 June 2023

Appearances and goals by club, season and competition
Club	Season	League			Cup (Note: Malaysia FA Cup)		League Cup (Note: Malaysia Cup)		Continental		Total	
Club	Season	Division	Apps	Goals	Apps	Goals	Apps	Goals	Apps	Goals	Apps	Goals
Terengganu	2017	Malaysia Premier League	18	5	6	0	5	0	–		29	5
Terengganu	2018	Malaysia Super League	19	1	2	0	9	2	–		30	3
Terengganu	Total		37	6	8	0	14	2	–		59	8
Selangor	2019	Malaysia Super League	18	1	2	2	7	0	–		27	3
Terengganu	2020	Malaysia Super League	11	0	–		1	0	–		12	0
Terengganu	2021	Malaysia Super League	17	2	–		9	2	–		26	4
Terengganu	2022	Malaysia Super League	11	0	4	2	5	0	–		20	2
Terengganu	2023	Malaysia Super League	2	0	0	0	0	0	–		2	0
Terengganu	Total		41	2	4	2	14	2	–	–	59	6
Career total			96	9	14	4	35	4	–	–	145	17

=== International ===
As of 11 June 2019

Appearances and goals by national team and year
National team	Year	Apps	Goals
Malaysia	2019	3	2
Malaysia	Total	3	2

==== International goals ====
Malaysia score listed first, score column indicates score after each Nasir goal.

List of international goals scored by Faiz Nasir
No.	Date	Venue	Cap	Opponent	Score	Result	Competition
1	23 March 2019	Bukit Jalil National Stadium, Kuala Lumpur, Malaysia	1	Afghanistan	1–1	2–1	2019 Airmarine Cup
2	7 June 2019	Bukit Jalil National Stadium, Kuala Lumpur, Malaysia	2	Timor-Leste	6–1	7–1	2022 FIFA World Cup qualification

== Honours ==
=== Club ===
Kelantan

- President Cup : 2013

Terengganu

- Malaysia Super League: Runner up : 2022
- Malaysia FA Cup: Runner up : 2022
- Malaysia Cup: Runner up : 2018, 2023
- Malaysia Charity Shield: Runner Up : 2023
