= Haidhir Suhaini =

Malaysian footballer

Personal information
- Full name: Mohammad Haidhir bin Suhaini
- Date of birth: 29 July 1996 (age 30)
- Place of birth: Terengganu, Malaysia
- Height: 1.72 m (5 ft 7 1/2 in)
- Position: Midfielder

Team information
- Current team: Real Chukai
- Number: 21

Youth career
- 2014–2017: Terengganu President Cup Team

Senior career*
Years	Team	Apps	(Gls)
2016–2017	Terengganu President Cup Team	46	(8)
2018	Terengganu FC II	8	(3)
2018–2019	Terengganu FC	6	(0)
2020–2022	Terengganu FC II		
2023–	Real Chukai	1	
- * Club domestic league appearances and goals as of 5 June 2023

Mohammad Haidhir bin Suhaini (born 29 July 1996) is a Malaysian footballer who plays for Real Chukai in the Malaysia M4 League as a midfielder.

== Club career ==
On 22 October 2016, Haidhir marked his debut and play 31 minutes of a 1–0 loss against Penang in Super League match.

== Career statistics ==
As of 27 April 2018.

Club	Season	League		Cup (Note: Includes Malaysia FA Cup and Malaysia Cup)		Continental (Note: Includes AFC Champions League and AFC Cup)		Total	
Club	Season	Apps	Goals	Apps	Goals	Apps	Goals	Apps	Goals
Terengganu	2016	1	0	0	0	0	0	1	0
Terengganu	2017	0	0	0	0	0	0	0	0
Total		1	0	0	0	0	0	1	0
Terengganu II	2018	5	0	0	0	0	0	5	0
Terengganu	2018	3	0	0	0	0	0	3	0
Career total		10	0	0	0	0	0	10	0
