= Hasnizaidi Jamian =

Malaysian footballer

Hasnizaidi
Personal information
- Full name: Hasnizaidi bin Jamian
- Date of birth: 27 March 1990 (age 36)
- Place of birth: Johor, Malaysia
- Height: 1.69 m (5 ft 6 1/2 in)
- Position: Right back

Senior career*
Years	Team	Apps	(Gls)
2011–2013	Johor Darul Ta'zim	27	(0)
2014–2017	Felda United	18	(0)
2018–2019	Terengganu	5	(0)
- * Club domestic league appearances and goals as of 1 July 2018

Hasnizaidi bin Jamian (born 27 March 1990) is a Malaysian footballer who plays as a right back for Terengganu.

== Career statistics ==
As of 27 June 2018

=== Club ===
Club	Season	League		Cup		League Cup		Continental		Total	
Club	Season	Apps	Goals	Apps	Goals	Apps	Goals	Apps	Goals	Apps	Goals
Felda United	2016	9	0	0	0	0	0	–		9	0
Felda United	2017	9	0	1	0	2	0	1	0	13	0
Felda United	Total	18	0	1	0	2	0	1	0	22	0
Terengganu	2018	1	0	1	0	0	0	–		2	0
Terengganu	Total	1	0	1	0	0	0	0	0	2	0
Career total		0	0	0	0	0	0	0	0	0	0
