= Lee Jun-hyeob =

South Korean footballer (born 1989)

Personal information
- Full name: Lee Jun-hyeob (이준협)
- Date of birth: 30 March 1989 (age 37)
- Place of birth: South Korea
- Height: 1.80 m (5 ft 11 in)
- Position: Forward

Team information
- Current team: National Defense Ministry

Youth career
- 2008–2009: Kwandong University

Senior career*
Years	Team	Apps	(Gls)
2010	Gangwon	3	(0)
2011–2012	Ulsan Hyundai Mipo Dockyard	1	(0)
2012–2013	Gangneung City	37	(19)
2013–2014	Eintracht Braunschweig II	11	(1)
2014–2016	Matsumoto Yamaga FC	1	(0)
2016–2017	Gangneung FC		
2017–2018	National Defense Ministry	0	(0)
2018	→ Terengganu FC I (loan)	3	(1)
2018	→ Terengganu FC II (loan)	6	(0)
- * Club domestic league appearances and goals as of 8 February 2018

- Lee Jun-hyeob
- Hangul: 이준협
- Hanja: 李俊協
- RR: I Junhyeop
- MR: I Chunhyŏp

Lee Jun-hyeob (Korean: 이준협; Hanja: 李俊協, born 30 March 1989) is a South Korean football player who plays for National Defense Ministry as a forward.

== Club career ==
=== Kwandong University ===
In university level, he and his university team that consist of freshman and sophomore student consecutively won the university championship of freshman and sophomore in 2009 spring and autumn competition.

=== Gangwon FC ===
He parted 2010 K-League draft, but he wasn't called any clubs in 2010 K-League draft. Lee was joined Gangwon FC lately in the preseason. His first K-League match was against Seongnam Ilhwa Chunma in Seongnam that Gangwon lose by 0–3 in away game by substitute on 27 February 2010.

=== Eintracht Braunschweig ===
During the second half of the 2013–14 Regionalliga season, Lee played for the reserve side of Eintracht Braunschweig in Germany.

=== Terengganu ===
On 4 February 2018, Lee signed a one-year contract with Malaysia Super League club Terengganu FC I, scoring his first goal with the club on 23 Feb 2018. He was later transferred to Terengganu's developmental team, Terengganu FC II on April the same year. He was released from his contract with Terengganu in June 2018.

== Club statistics ==
As of 28 March 2011

Club performance			League		Cup		League Cup		Total	
Season	Club	League	Apps	Goals	Apps	Goals	Apps	Goals	Apps	Goals
South Korea			League		KFA Cup		League Cup		Total	
2010	Gangwon FC	K-League	3	0	0	0	0	0	3	0
Total	South Korea		3	0	0	0	0	0	3	0
Career total			3	0	0	0	0	0	3	0
