= Radhi Hamza al-Radhi =

Iraqi judge

Judge Radhi Hamza al-Radhi was the head of Iraq’s Commission on Public Integrity. He believes that corruption has cost Iraq £9 billion in the past three years and that most of the money has ended up in the hands of the sectarian militias.

On October 4, 2007, al-Radhi appeared before the U.S. House Committee on Oversight and Government Reform and accused the government of Prime Minister Nuri Kamal al-Maliki of protecting corrupt employees and of actively attempting to "eradicate or control the Commission" and refusing to recognize the independence of the Commission on Public Integrity in violation of the Iraqi Constitution. The government responded by announcing they would sue al-Radhi for smuggling official documents, defaming the prime minister, and corruption.

He was granted asylum in the United States in July 2008.
