= Igor Zonjić =

Serbian-born Montenegrin footballer

Personal information
- Date of birth: 16 October 1991 (age 35)
- Place of birth: Belgrade, SFR Yugoslavia
- Height: 1.88 m (6 ft 2 in)
- Position: Centre back

Youth career
- Partizan
- Obilić

Senior career*
Years	Team	Apps	(Gls)
2009–2012	Banat Zrenjanin	76	(3)
2012–2014	Partizan	0	(0)
2012–2013	→ Teleoptik (loan)	27	(1)
2013	→ Sinđelić (loan)	12	(0)
2014	→ Mladost Lučani (loan)	11	(0)
2014–2015	Mladost Lučani	21	(2)
2015–2016	Napredak Kruševac	26	(3)
2016–2017	Bezanija	13	(2)
2017	Sutjeska Nikšić	9	(0)
2017	Rad	18	(2)
2018–2019	Terengganu	35	(3)
2019–2020	AGMK	18	(1)
2021	Napredak Kruševac	10	(0)
2021–2022	Noravank	17	(0)
2022	Foresta Suceava	0	(0)

International career
2009–2010	Montenegro U19	5	(0)
2010	Montenegro U21	1	(0)
- * Club domestic league appearances and goals as of 06:51, 21 June 2022 (UTC)

Igor Zonjić (Serbian Cyrillic: Игор Зоњић; born 16 October 1991) is a Serbian-born Montenegrin professional footballer.

== Club career ==
After playing in the youth teams of Partizan and Obilić, Zonjić started his professional career with Banat Zrenjanin in the 2009–10 season. He made 76 appearances and scored three goals in the Serbian First League during his three-year tenure at the club.

On 30 July 2012, Zonjić signed a four-year contract with Partizan, but was immediately loaned to Teleoptik. He made 27 appearances and scored one goal for the Opticians during the 2012–13 Serbian First League.

== International career ==
Although born in Serbia, Zonjić represented Montenegro at Under-19 and Under-21 level.

== Honours ==
Mladost

- Serbian First League: 2013–14

== Career statistics ==
As of 27 June 2018

Season	Club	Division	Apps	Goals
2010–11	Banat Zrenjanin	Div 2	28	2
2011–12	Banat Zrenjanin	Div 2	32	1
2012–13	Teleoptik	Div 2	27	1
2013–14	Sinđelić Beograd	Div 2	12	0
2013–14	Mladost Lučani	Div 2	11	0
2014–15	Mladost Lučani	Div 1	21	2
2015–16	Napredak Kruševac	Div 2	26	3
2016–17	Bežanija	Div 2	13	2
2016–17	Sutjeska Nikšić	Div 1	9	0
2017–18	Rad	Div 1	18	2
2018	Terengganu	Div 1	15	0

== Honours ==
Mladost Lučani

- Serbian First League: 2013–14

Napredak Kruševac

- Serbian First League: 2015–16
