= Sanjar Shaakhmedov =

Uzbekistani footballer

Personal information
- Full name: Sanjar Shaakhmedov
- Date of birth: 23 September 1990 (age 36)
- Place of birth: Tashkent, Uzbek SSR, Soviet Union
- Height: 5 ft 8 in (1.73 m)
- Position: Midfielder

Team information
- Current team: Metallurg Bekabad

Senior career*
Years	Team	Apps	(Gls)
2010–2014	AGMK	98	(11)
2015–2017	Lokomotiv Tashkent	15	(1)
2017	Al-Sailiya	8	(2)
2017–2019	Lokomotiv Tashkent	46	(10)
2019–2020	Terengganu	37	(16)
2021	AGMK	24	(1)
2022	Qizilqum	26	(1)
2023	Sogdiana Jizzakh	23	(0)
2024	Dinamo Samarqand	23	(1)
2025	Khorazm	14	(0)
2026–	Metallurg Bekabad	0	(0)

International career^{‡}
2015–2021	Uzbekistan	3	(0)
- * Club domestic league appearances and goals as of 19 March 2026 ‡ National team caps and goals as of 6 June 2024

Sanjar Shaakhmedov (Russian: Санжар Шоахмедов; born 23 September 1990) is an Uzbekistani professional footballer who plays as a midfielder for Uzbekistan Super League club Metallurg Bekabad.

== Career ==
=== Lokomotiv Tashkent (2015–2017) ===
Sanjar started his professional football career at Lokomotiv Tashkent in 2015, making his debut in a 3-1 defeat against Al Hilal for the AFC Champions League on 25 February 2015, and scoring his first goal in a 5-0 victory against Al-Sadd on 8 April 2015.

=== Al-Sailiya ===
Sanjar signed for Al-Sailiya for €500 thousand on 16 January 2017, making his first match on the club in a 1-0 victory against Umm Salal for Stars League on 20 January 2017, and scoring his first goal in a 1-1 draw against El-Jaish on 2 February 2017.

=== Lokomotiv Tashkent (2017–2019) ===
Sanjar came back to Lokomotiv for €300 thousand on 7 August 2017, making his comeback match in a 4-0 victory against Sogdiana for O'Zbekiston Superligasi on 12 August 2017 and scoring his first goal for the season in a 3-1 victory against FK Obod on 29 September 2017.

=== Terengganu FC ===
Sanjar signed with Terengganu FC on 4 January 2019. He debuted against PKNS FC on 1 February 2019. The match ended 1-1.

== International career ==
=== Uzbekistan (2015-2016) ===
Sanjar was called up to the Uzbekistan national team for the 2018 FIFA World Cup qualification matches, but he stayed on the bench for 7 out of the 8 matches played by the squad. For the match against Yemen, he wasn't in the starting lineup, nor on the bench.
