= Khairul Izuan =

Malaysian footballer (born 1991)

Personal information
- Full name: Mohd Khairul Izuan bin Rosli
- Date of birth: 9 March 1991 (age 35)
- Place of birth: Kota Bharu, Kelantan, Malaysia
- Height: 1.68 m (5 ft 6 in)
- Positions: Attacking midfielder; second striker; winger

Team information
- Current team: Kelantan The Real Warriors
- Number: 21

Youth career
- 2007–2009: Kelantan U21

Senior career*
Years	Team	Apps	(Gls)
2008–2009	Harimau Muda	14	(6)
2009–2011	ATM	21	(12)
2011–2017	Kelantan	78	(8)
2017–2018	Negeri Sembilan	10	(0)
2019	Terengganu	7	(1)
2020	Kelantan United	9	(2)
2020–2021	UiTM	11	(0)
2021–2022	PDRM	8	(0)
2022–2023	BRM Kuala Kangsar	15	(7)
2025–	Kelantan The Real Warriors	0	(0)

International career^{‡}
2009	Malaysia U19	16	(2)
- * Club domestic league appearances and goals as of 31 August 2025 ‡ National team caps and goals as of 27 January 2016

Mohd Khairul Izuan bin Rosli (born 9 March 1991) is a Malaysian professional footballer who plays for Malaysia Super League club Kelantan The Real Warriors. Khairul Izuan mainly plays as an attacking midfielder but can also play as a second striker or as a right winger.

== Club career ==
Khairul Izuan began his career with Kelantan U21 team in 2007 before moving and playing for Harimau Muda in Liga Premier in 2008 and 2009.

Khairul Izuan signed with Malaysian Armed Forces football club in 2010. After a season there, he returned and played for Kelantan's youth team. Khairul Izuan was part of the winning team in the 2010 Malaysia President Cup. The next season, he was a substitute on the Kelantan senior team.

== Career statistics ==
=== Club ===
As of 10 July 2018.

Appearances and goals by club, season and competition
Club	Season	League			Cup		League Cup		Continental		Total	
Club	Season	Division	Apps	Goals	Apps	Goals	Apps	Goals	Apps	Goals	Apps	Goals
Kelantan	2012	Malaysia Super League	0	0	0	0	0	0	0	0	0	0
Kelantan	2013	Malaysia Super League	17	0	2	0			2	0	20	0
Kelantan	2014	Malaysia Super League	19	4	5	1	4	1	8	2	36	8
Kelantan	2015	Malaysia Super League	16	1	6	0	4	0	—		26	1
Kelantan	2016	Malaysia Super League	10	1	2	0	2	0	—		14	1
Kelantan	2017	Malaysia Super League	16	2	0	0	6	3	—		21	5
Kelantan	Total		78	8	15	1	16	4	10	2	119	15
Negeri Sembilan	2018	Malaysia Super League	10	0	1	0	0	0	—		11	0
Negeri Sembilan	Total		10	0	1	0	0	0	0	0	11	0
Terengganu	2019	Malaysia Super League	0	0	0	0	0	0	—		0	0
Terengganu	Total		0	0	0	0	0	0	0	0	0	0
Kelantan United	2020	Malaysia Super League	0	0	0	0	0	0	—		0	0
Kelantan United	Total		0	0	0	0	0	0	0	0	0	0
Career total			88	8	16	1	16	4	10	2	130	15

== International career ==
Khairul Izuan made many appearances for the Malaysia under-19 team since 2009.

== Honours ==
=== Club ===
Kelantan U21

- Piala Presiden: 2010

Kelantan

- Liga Super: 2011, 2012; Runner-up 2010
- Piala Malaysia: 2010, 2012; Runner-up 2009
- Piala FA: 2012, 2012; Runner-up 2011, 2009, 2015
- Piala Sumbangsih: 2011; Runner-up 2012, 2013
