= Ilham Amirullah =

Malaysian footballer

Ilham Amirullah Razali
Personal information
- Full name: Muhammad Ilham Amirullah Bin Razali
- Date of birth: 26 February 1994 (age 32)
- Place of birth: Terengganu, Malaysia
- Height: 1.80 m (5 ft 11 in)
- Position: Goalkeeper

Team information
- Current team: PT Athletic F.C.
- Number: 25

Youth career
- Harimau Muda B

Senior career*
Years	Team	Apps	(Gls)
2012–2014	Harimau Muda B	32	(0)
2015	Harimau Muda	10	(0)
2016	T–Team	8	(0)
2017	Felda United		
2018	Negeri Sembilan	13	(0)
2019–2020	Terengganu	12	(0)
2021–2022	Kedah Darul Aman	6	(0)
2023	Kelantan United	5	(0)
- * Club domestic league appearances and goals

Muhammad Ilham Amirullah Bin Razali (born 26 February 1994) is a Malaysian professional footballer who currently plays as a goalkeeper for PT Athletic F.C.

== Career statistics ==
=== Club ===
As of 15 October 2022.

Club performance		League		Cup		League Cup		Continental		Total	
Season	Club	Apps	Goals	Apps	Goals	Apps	Goals	Apps	Goals	Apps	Goals
Malaysia		League		Cup		League Cup		—		Total	
2012	Harimau Muda B	3	0	0	0	0	0	–	–	3	0
Total		3	0	0	0	0	0	–	–	3	0
Singapore		League		Cup		League Cup		Continental		Total	
2013	Harimau Muda B	16	0	1	0	1	0	–	–	18	0
2014	Harimau Muda B	16	0	-	-	-	-	-	-	16	0
2015	Harimau Muda B	0	0	-	-	-	-	-	-	0	0
Total		32	0	1	0	1	0	–	–	34	0
Singapore		League		Cup		League Cup		Continental		Total	
2015	Harimau Muda	10	0	0	0	0	0	–	–	10	0
Total		10	0	0	0	0	0	–	–	10	0
Malaysia		League		Cup		League Cup		Continental		Total	
2016	T-Team	8	0	0	0	8	0	–	–	16	0
Total		8	0	0	0	8	0	–	–	16	0
2017	Felda United	0	0	0	0	2	0	1	0	3	0
Total		0	0	0	0	2	0	1	0	3	0
2018	Negeri Sembilan	13	0	1	0	1	0	–	–	15	0
Total		13	0	1	0	1	0	–	–	15	0
2019	Terengganu FC	10	0	0	0	1	0	–	–	11	0
2020	Terengganu FC	2	0	0	0	0	0	–	–	2	0
Total		12	0	0	0	1	0	–	–	13	0
2021	Kedah Darul Aman	0	0	0	0	1	0	0	0	1	0
2022	Kedah Darul Aman	6	0	1	0	0	0	0	0	7	0
Total		6	0	1	0	1	0	–	–	8	0
Career Total		84	0	3	0	14	0	1	0	102	0
