= Kan Pisal =

Cambodian footballer

Kan Pisal កាន់ ពិសាល
Personal information
- Full name: Kan Pisal
- Date of birth: 9 August 1998 (age 28)
- Place of birth: Kampong Speu, Cambodia
- Height: 1.73 m (5 ft 8 in)
- Position: Right-back

Senior career*
Years	Team	Apps	(Gls)
2018–2023	Tiffy Army		
2023–2024	Boeung Ket	2	(0)
2025–2026	Preah Khan Reach Svay Rieng	7	(0)
2025–2026	→ Life Sihanoukville (loan)	9	(1)

International career
2019	Cambodia U23		
2019–	Cambodia	4	(0)
- * Club domestic league appearances and goals as of 9 March 2026

Kan Pisal (born 9 August 1998) is a Cambodian footballer who plays as a right-back for Cambodian Premier League club Life Sihanoukville on loan from Preah Khan Reach Svay Rieng and the Cambodia national team.

== International career ==
Kan Pisal got his first call-up for the under 23 level team in the 2020 AFC U-23 Championship qualification matches from 22 to 26 March 2019.

== Honours ==
Svay Rieng

- AFC Challenge League: 2024–25 runner-up
