= Shahrul Aizad =

Malaysian association football player

Personal information
- Full name: Mohd Shahrul Aizad bin Zukifli
- Date of birth: 26 March 1993 (age 33)
- Place of birth: Kuantan, Malaysia
- Height: 1.67 m (5 ft 5 1/2 in)
- Position: Winger

Team information
- Current team: Yayasan Pahang Maintenance
- Number: 11

Senior career*
Years	Team	Apps	(Gls)
2014	Sri Pahang	0	(0)
2015–2017	Kuantan	0	(0)
2018–2019	Terengganu	14	(1)
2020	Felda United	2	(0)
2021–2023	Sri Pahang	5	(0)
2024–	YPM FC		
- * Club domestic league appearances and goals as of 9 March 2021

Mohd Shahrul Aizad bin Zukifli (born 26 March 1993), commonly known as Cotang, is a Malaysian professional footballer who plays as a left winger for Malaysia A2 Amateur League club Yayasan Pahang Maintenance.

== Career statistics ==
=== Club ===
As of match played 1 September 2021

Appearances and goals by club, season and competition
Club	Season	League			Cup		League Cup		Continental		Total	
Club	Season	Division	Apps	Goals	Apps	Goals	Apps	Goals	Apps	Goals	Apps	Goals
Terengganu	2018	Malaysia Super League	8	1	2	2	11	1	–		21	4
Terengganu	2019	Malaysia Super League	6	0	1	0	0	0	–		7	0
Terengganu	Total		14	1	3	2	11	1	–		28	4
Felda United	2020	Malaysia Super League	2	0	0	0	0	0	–		2	0
Felda United	Total		2	0	0	0	0	0	–		2	0
Sri Pahang	2021	Malaysia Super League	5	0	0	0	0	0	–		5	0
Sri Pahang	Total		5	0	0	0	0	0	–		5	0
Career Total			0	0	0	0	0	0	–	–	0	0
