= Serhiy Andryeyev =

Ukrainian footballer (born 1990)

Personal information
- Full name: Serhiy Volodymyrovych Andryeyev
- Date of birth: 14 March 1990 (age 36)
- Place of birth: Lysychansk, Ukrainian SSR, Soviet Union
- Height: 1.87 m (6 ft 1 1/2 in)
- Position: Centre-back

Youth career
- 200?—2007: Stal Alchevsk

Senior career*
| Years | Team | Apps | (Gls) |
| 2008 | Stal Alchevsk | 0 | (0) |
| 2010 | Shakhtar Sverdlovsk | 9 | (0) |
| 2011–2012 | Prykarpattia | 13 | (2) |
| 2012–2013 | Podillya Khmelnytskyi | 15 | (0) |
| 2013 | Krymteplytsia | 10 | (0) |
| 2014–2015 | Arsenal-Kyivshchyna Bila Tserkva | 38 | (0) |
| 2016 | Enerhiya Nova Kakhovka | 24 | (2) |
| 2017 | Nyva Vinnytsia | 29 | (3) |
| 2018 | Nyva Ternopil | 8 | (0) |
| 2018 | Nyva Vinnytsia | 3 | (0) |
| 2019 | Terengganu F.C. | 5 | (1) |
| 2020-2021 | Terengganu F.C. | 15 | (3) |
- * Club domestic league appearances and goals as of 20 March 2020

Serhiy Volodymyrovych Andryeyev (Ukrainian: Сергій Володимирович Андрєєв; born 14 March 1990) is a Ukrainian footballer who last plays as a centre-back for Terengganu II.
