= Kim Hyun-woo (footballer, born 1989) =

South Korean footballer

Personal information
- Date of birth: 17 April 1989 (age 37)
- Place of birth: Seoul, South Korea
- Height: 1.85 m (6 ft 1 in)
- Position: Forward

Youth career
- 2005–2007: Joongdong High School
- 2008–2011: Kwangwoon University

Senior career*
Years	Team	Apps	(Gls)
2012–2013	Seongnam Ilhwa	8	(0)
2013–2015	Icheon Citizen	73	(31)
2016	Daejeon Korail	5	(2)
2016	Phnom Penh Crown	7	(4)
2017	Shan United	9	(3)
2017	PKNP	7	(5)
2018	Terengganu F.C. I	-	(-)
Korean name
Hangul	김현우
Hanja	金玄雨
RR	Gim Hyeonu
MR	Kim Hyŏnu
IPA	kimɦjʌnu
- * Club domestic league appearances and goals as of 27 September 2017

Kim Hyun-woo (Korean: 김현우; born 17 April 1989) is a South Korean footballer who plays as a forward, most recently for Terengganu FA in Malaysia Super League.

== Club career ==
He joined Seongnam Ilhwa Chunma in 2012. He made his league debut in the match against Daejeon Citizen on 4 April 2012. On 1 July 2016, he signed a contract with six times Cambodian League's champion Phnom Penh Crown.

In June 2017, Hyun-woo signed a 5-months contract with PKNP F.C., a club in the Malaysia Premier League.

In December 2017, Hyun-woo signed a 1-year contract with Malaysia Super League team Terengganu F.C. I. But Hyun-woo sustained an injury in January 2018 during a training session, and were sidelined from the team for at least 6 months.
