= Wan Azraie =

Malaysian footballer

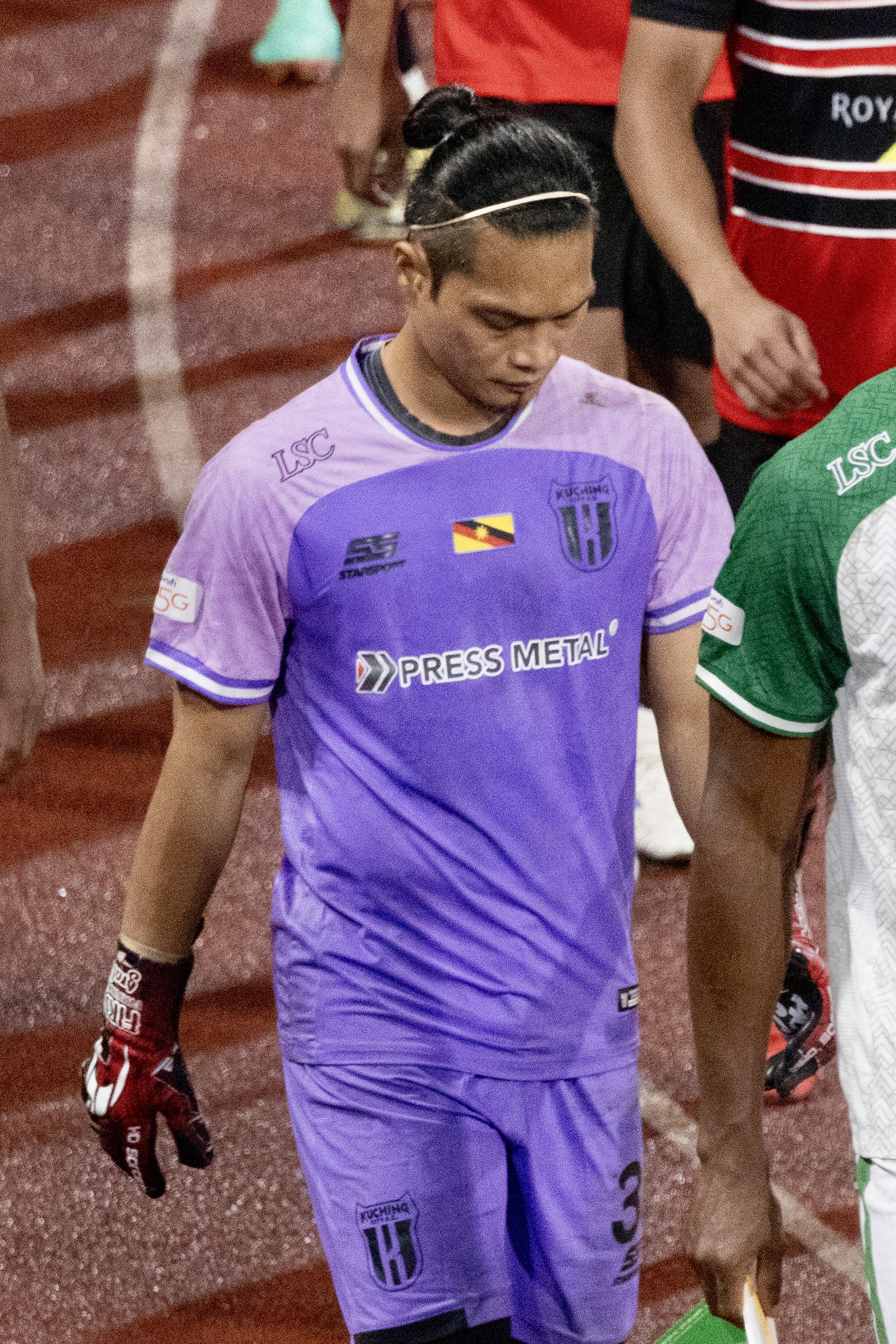
- Wan Azraie with Kuching City in 2025

Personal information
- Birth name: Wan Muhammad Azraie bin Wan Teh
- Date of birth: 7 July 1986 (age 40)
- Place of birth: Kuala Terengganu, Malaysia
- Height: 1.77 m (5 ft 9 1/2 in)
- Position: Goalkeeper

Team information
- Current team: Kuching City
- Number: 38

Senior career*
Years	Team	Apps	(Gls)
2009–2010	Shahzan Muda	0	(0)
2011	Pahang	3	(0)
2012–2013	Terengganu	9	(0)
2014–2016	T–Team	14	(0)
2017	Pahang	17	(0)
2018–2019	Terengganu	9	(0)
2020	Sabah	0	(0)
2021–	Kuching City	13	(0)
- * Club domestic league appearances and goals as of June 27, 2018 ‡ National team caps and goals as of January 25, 2017

Wan Muhammad Azraie bin Wan Teh (born 7 July 1986) is a Malaysian footballer who plays for Kuching City as a goalkeeper.

Wan Azraie saved an incredible four penalties as Pahang FA returned to the 2013 Malaysia Super League after an absence of one year following a 3-2 sudden-death shootout win over Kedah FA in the promotion-relegation final at the Hang Jebat Stadium in Malacca in July 2012.

== Club career ==
=== Early career ===
Wan Azraie started his career with Pahang in 2011. He performed with the team until 2012. In 2013 he joined Terengganu for the 2013 season.

=== Pahang ===
Azraie signed with Pahang FA in 2017 season after his departure from Terengganu-based club, T-Team.

=== Terengganu ===
On 8 November 2017, it was confirmed that Wan Azraie has not extend his contract with Pahang and signed with Terengganu.

== Career statistics ==
As of 27 June 2018

Club	Season	League		Cup (Note: The Malaysia FA Cup)		League Cup (Note: The Malaysia Cup)		Continental		Total	
Club	Season	Apps	Goals	Apps	Goals	Apps	Goals	Apps	Goals	Apps	Goals
Terengganu	2012	0	0	0	0	0	0	–		0	0
Terengganu	2013	9	0	1	0	0	0	–		10	0
Terengganu	Total	0	0	0	0	0	0	0	0	0	0
T–Team	2014	0	0	0	0	0	0	–		0	0
T–Team	2015	0	0	0	0	0	0	–		10	0
T–Team	2016	14	0	1	0	0	0	–		0	0
T–Team	Total	0	0	0	0	0	0	0	0	0	0
Pahang	2017	17	0	7	0	7	0	–		31	0
Pahang	Total	17	0	7	0	7	0	0	0	31	0
Terengganu	2018	5	0	0	0	0	0	–		5	0
Terengganu	2019	3	0	1	0	0	0	–		4	0
Terengganu	Total	8	0	1	0	0	0	0	0	9	0
