= Patrick Cruz =

Brazilian footballer

Personal information
- Full name: Patrick dos Santos Cruz
- Date of birth: 1 April 1993 (age 33)
- Place of birth: Uberaba, Brazil
- Height: 1.85 m (6 ft 1 in)
- Position: Forward

Team information
- Current team: Kendal Tornado
- Number: 9

Youth career
- 2008–2012: São Paulo
- 2013–2014: Corinthians

Senior career*
Years	Team	Apps	(Gls)
2015	Flamengo de Guarulhos	8	(1)
2015–2016	Mitra Kukar	9	(7)
2016–2017	T-Team	20	(10)
2017–2018	Saigon	22	(7)
2018–2019	Pahang	17	(11)
2019	Chonburi	12	(1)
2020	SKA-Khabarovsk	6	(0)
2022–2023	Għajnsielem	16	(8)
2023–2024	Phrae United	31	(10)
2024	Pattaya United	13	(3)
2025	Lampang	16	(5)
2025–	Kendal Tornado	26	(17)

International career
2012–2014	Brazil U20	16	(4)
2014	Brazil U23	2	(0)
- * Club domestic league appearances and goals as of 3 October 2026

Patrick dos Santos Cruz (born 1 April 1993) is a Brazilian professional footballer who played as a forward for Championship club Kendal Tornado.

== Club career ==
=== Early career ===
Cruz began his career at São Paulo, and in 2014, he went to court against the club due to irregularities in his contract. Born in Uberaba, Minas Gerais, Cruz came through the youth academy at União Barbarense and impressed from an early age. Cruz was spotted by talent scouts who took him to the state capital where he subsequently joined São Paulo in 2011 at the age of 14. Cruz was part of the champion squad of the 2010 Copa São Paulo de Futebol Júnior, alongside Casemiro and Lucas Moura.

=== Corinthians ===
Initially, Cruz joined Corinthians after a contractual dispute with his former club Flamengo with Cruz's agent claiming that the club had not paid salaries as promised. That year, he also made 8 substitute appearances for the team in the Campeonato Brasileiro Série A.

=== T-Team F.C. ===
On 16 January 2016, Cruz signed a contract with Malaysia Super League club T-Team after association of Indonesia football been suspended that year.

=== Saigon FC ===
On 10 January 2017, Vietnamese club Saigon announced the signing of Cruz for the 2017 V.League 1 season. Cruz made his debut for Sài Gòn in a 2–1 win over SHB Da Nang on 14 January 2017 and scored one goal in that match.

=== Pahang FA ===
On 23 February 2018, Cruz signed with Malaysia Super League side Pahang. One day later, he made his debut for Pahang and scored one goal in a 3–1 win over Selangor at KLFA Stadium.

Cruz start his campaign with flying colours by scoring a hat trick in the second leg FA cup match at Larkin Stadium which saw Pahang eliminated JDT 3–0 on aggregate.

On 28 April 2018, in league fixture he scored a goal to helped Pahang win over Malacca 2–0.

== Career statistics ==
=== Club ===
As of 1 July 2018

Appearances and goals by club, season and competition
Club	Season	League			National cup		League cup		Continental		Total	
Club	Season	Division	Apps	Goals	Apps	Goals	Apps	Goals	Apps	Goals	Apps	Goals
T-Team	2016	Malaysia Super League	20	18	1	0	3	3	–		24	21
Saigon	2017	V.League 1	22	17	0	0	0	0	–		22	17
Pahang	2018	Malaysia Super League	9	6	4	3	0	0	–		13	9
Career total			0	0	0	0	0	0	0	0	0	0
