= Azalinullah Alias =

Malaysian footballer

Personal information
- Full name: Muhammad Azalinullah bin Mohammed Alias
- Date of birth: 19 March 1996 (age 30)
- Place of birth: Terengganu, Malaysia
- Height: 1.70 m (5 ft 7 in)
- Position: Central midfielder

Team information
- Current team: Immigration FC II
- Number: 8

Youth career
- –2016: Terengganu

Senior career*
Years	Team	Apps	(Gls)
2017	T-Team	12	(0)
2018	PJ Rangers	7	(1)
2019–2022	Terengganu	17	(0)
2023–2026	Perak		
- * Club domestic league appearances and goals

Muhammad Azalinullah bin Mohammed Alias (born 19 March 1996) is a Malaysian professional footballer who plays as a midfielder.

== Career statistics ==
=== Club ===
As of match played 29 August 2021

Appearances and goals by club, season and competition
Club	Season	League			Cup (Note: Malaysia FA Cup)		League Cup (Note: Malaysia Cup)		Continental		Total	
Club	Season	Division	Apps	Goals	Apps	Goals	Apps	Goals	Apps	Goals	Apps	Goals
Terengganu	2020	Malaysia Super League	9	0	0	0	1	0	–		10	0
Terengganu	2021	Malaysia Super League	3	0	0	0	0	0	–		3	0
Terengganu	2022	Malaysia Super League	5	0	0	0	1	0	–		6	0
Total			17	0	0	0	2	0	–	–	19	0
Career total			0	0	0	0	0	0	–	–	0	0
