= Radhi Yusof =

Malaysian footballer

Personal information
- Full name: Muhammad Radhi bin Mohd Yusof
- Date of birth: 11 February 1993 (age 33)
- Place of birth: Terengganu, Malaysia
- Height: 1.80 m (5 ft 11 in)
- Position: Centre-back

Senior career*
Years	Team	Apps	(Gls)
2012	Harimau Muda B	5	(0)
2013–2020	Terengganu	3	(0)
- * Club domestic league appearances and goals as of 29 August 2021

Muhammad Radhi bin Mohd Yusof (born 11 February 1993) is a Malaysian footballer who plays as a centre-back.
