= Hakim Hassan =

Malaysian footballer

Personal information
- Full name: Mohammad Nor Hakim bin Hassan
- Date of birth: 2 October 1991 (age 35)
- Place of birth: Kuala Terengganu, Malaysia
- Height: 1.68 m (5 ft 6 in)
- Positions: Winger; attacking midfielder

Senior career*
Years	Team	Apps	(Gls)
2011	MP Muar	10	(0)
2012–2014	PKNS	20	(1)
2014	→ Terengganu (loan)	8	(0)
2015–2017	T–Team	28	(11)
2018–2019	Perak	42	(7)
2020–2023	Selangor	52	(7)
2023–2025	Terengganu	18	(4)

International career^{‡}
2018–	Malaysia	6	(0)
Medal record
Men's football
Representing Malaysia
AFF Championship
Third place	2022
- * Club domestic league appearances and goals as of 18 February 2025 ‡ National team caps and goals as of 10 January 2023

Mohammad Nor Hakim bin Hassan (born 2 October 1991 in Terengganu) is a Malaysian professional footballer who play as a winger or attacking midfielder for the Malaysia national team. His pace and dribbling ability made him an established winger in Malaysia. Nor Hakim previously played for MP Muar, Terengganu, T-Team and PKNS.

== Career statistics ==
=== Club ===
As of match played 24 May 2023

Appearances and goals by club, season and competition
Club	Season	League			Cup		League Cup		Continental		Total	
Club	Season	Division	Apps	Goals	Apps	Goals	Apps	Goals	Apps	Goals	Apps	Goals
Terengganu (loan)	2014	Malaysia Super League	8	0	2	0	0	0	–		10	0
Terengganu (loan)	Total		8	0	2	0	0	0	–	–	10	0
T-Team	2015	Malaysia Premier League	0	5	0	0	0	0	–		24	5
T-Team	2016	Malaysia Super League	8	1	0	0	0	1	–		0	2
T-Team	2017	Malaysia Super League	20	5	2	0	5	1	–		27	6
T-Team	Total		28	11	2	0	5	2	–	–	35	13
Perak	2018	Malaysia Super League	21	5	4	1	10	1	–		35	7
Perak	2019	Malaysia Super League	21	2	7	0	1	0	2	0	31	2
Perak	Total		42	7	11	1	11	1	2	0	66	9
Selangor	2020	Malaysia Super League	0	0	0	0	0	0	–		0	0
Selangor	2021	Malaysia Super League	18	1	0	0	0	0	–		18	1
Selangor	2022	Malaysia Super League	19	5	4	1	7	0	–		29	6
Selangor	2023	Malaysia Super League	4	0	0	0	0	0	0	0	4	0
Selangor	Total		41	6	4	1	7	0	–	–	51	7
Career Total			119	24	19	2	23	3	2	0	161	29

=== International ===
As of match played 10 January 2023

Appearances and goals by national team, year and competition
National Team	Year	Competitive		Friendly		Total	
National Team	Year	Apps	Goals	Apps	Goals	Apps	Goals
Malaysia	2018	0	0	1	0	1	0
Malaysia	2022	3	0	2	0	5	0
Total		3	0	3	0	6	0

== Honours ==
=== Club ===
Perak

- Malaysia Super League runner-up: 2018
- Malaysia Cup: 2018
- Malaysia FA Cup runner-up: 2019
- Malaysia Charity Shield Runner-up: 2019

==== Selangor ====
- Malaysia Cup runner-up: 2022

==== Terengganu FC ====
- Malaysia Cup runner-up: 2023
- Malaysia Charity Shield runner-up: 2023
