= 2016 Selangor FA season =

2016 season of Malaysian association football club

Selangor FA
2016 season
- Chairman: Mohamed Azmin Ali
- Manager: Amirudin Shari
- Head coach: Zainal Abidin Hassan (until 7 August); K. Gunalan (interim-coach, from 7 August)
- Stadium: 1. Shah Alam Stadium; 2. Majlis Perbandaran Selayang Stadium
- Super League: 5th
- FA Cup: Third Round
- Malaysia Cup: Runners-up
- Charity Shield: Runners-up
- AFC Cup: Group Stage (3rd)
- Top goalscorer: League: (9 goals); Patrick Wleh; All: (19 goals); Patrick Wleh
- Highest home attendance: 15,186; Malaysia Cup; Selangor vs T–Team (1 October 2016)
- Lowest home attendance: 1,647; Super League; Selangor vs Pahang (10 September 2016)
- Average home league attendance: 4,995
- Biggest win: Super League; 5–2 v Kelantan (A) (21 May 2016); Malaysia Cup; 3–0 v Pahang (H) (9 August 2016); Malaysia Cup; 4–1 v Kelantan (A) (12 August 2016); Malaysia Cup; 3–0 v T–Team (A) (15 October 2016)
- Biggest defeat: Super League; 1–3 v Terengganu (A) (11 March 2016); Super League; 1–3 v FELDA United (A) (8 April 2016)
Home colours	Away colours	Third colours

The 2016 Selangor FA Season is Selangor FA's 11th season playing soccer in the Malaysia Super League, since its inception in 2004.

Selangor FA began the season on 7 February 2016. They also competed in three domestic cups: the FA Cup Malaysia, Malaysia Cup; the Malaysia Charity Shield; and an international cup, the AFC Cup.

== Season overview ==
=== Pre-season ===
(Squad build and first transfers)

On 18 December 2015, Selangor made announcement with signing of four new local players from Pahang, Hafiz Kamal, R. Gopinathan, Khairulazhan and Razman Roslan. Selangor also brought in a new goalkeeper from AirAsia, Zarif Irfan Hashimuddin.

On 31 December 2015, Selangor announced that Mehmet Durakovic would step down at the end of the season after successfully led the Red Giants to win the Malaysia Cup last season. He was then replaced by Zainal Abidin Hassan from Pahang on 1 January 2016.

New coach Selangor, Zainal Abidin then bring in new foreign players from Argentina and Liberia, Mauro Olivi and Patrick Wleh, to replace Brazilian duo Guilherme de Paula and Leandro Dos Santos, after both their contracts were not renewed by the club. Selangor signs Patrick Wleh from PKNS on loan, while Mauro Olivi brought in as a free agent after the expiration of the contract with the football club Peru, León de Huánuco.

The contracts of import Indonesian player Andik Vermansyah were renewed for another two years and are set to expire at the end of 2017. Robert Cornthwaite extended his contract until the end of 2016.

On 18 December 2015, The Red Giants release some of the players who will move to another team to face the new challenges of the 2016 season. On that day, Hamsani Ahmad retired from professional football. On the same day after the announcement of the Selangor's new coach, Afiq Azmi, Shazlan Alias and Syamim Othman left to join Malaysian Premier League club (second division), Negeri Sembilan. K. Gurusamy and K. Thanaraj confirmed that they was set to join Sarawak, while Thamil Arasu decides to join Kuala Lumpur for next season.

Before the first transfer window closed, Selangor quickly signs Adam Nor Azlin from Malaysia youth's team, Harimau Muda A.

=== Mid-season ===
(Second transfers)

On 5 July 2016, Selangor and Australian centre-back Robert Cornthwaite reached an agreement to terminate his contract after a year and half with the team. Selangor had to release Cornthwaite for reasons his poor form and constant injuries throughout the first half of the Malaysia Super League (MSL) campaign. He then signed with Australian club Western Sydney Wanderers.

On 9 July, Selangor announced the signing of the new import player from Nigeria Ugo Ukah. Ukah will replace the position left by Cornthwaite and signed a contract until the end of 2016.

Before the second transfer window closed, Selangor and the Super League club champions, Johor Darul Ta'zim have reached an agreement for the transfer of defender Azrif Nasrulhaq for a reported fee of £130,450. Azrif made the shock decision to join JDT though his contract with the Red Giants still remaining one and a half years and will expire at the end of 2017.

=== Pre-season and friendly matches ===
On 19 January 2016, Selangor kicked off the preseason with a 2–0 victory over Sarawak. Goals from Patrick Wleh and Hafiz Kamal secured the win at their interim home in Selayang. On 26 January, Selangor continued their winning streak at home after defeating Kuala Lumpur 2–1, thanks to goals from new foreign players, Patrick Wleh and Mauro Olivi. Two days later, the team travelled north to George Town, Penang, to play against Penang FA at Penang City Stadium. Selangor lost the match 1–0 with a goal from local player Jafri Firdaus, in the 83rd-minute.

Selangor then flew to Thailand for a match against two club Thailand from Thai Division 1 League, Nakhon Pathom and Samut Songkhram R-Airlines. On 31 January, in the first tour match, Selangor been defeated by Nakhon Pathom 2–0. Next day, Selangor once again failed to win in a friendly match tour when they lost 4–2 to Samut Songkhram. As a whole, Selangor ended the pre-season and friendly matches with 2 wins and 3 defeats.

=== February ===
As Malaysia Cup champions, Selangor began the season against the holders of the Super League, Johor Darul Ta'zim in the 2016 Charity Shield. That match was also the first game in the league for both teams. The match was played at Tan Sri Dato Haji Hassan Yunos Stadium, in Larkin, Johor on 13 February 2016. The game finished 1–1 after 90 minutes, Selangor lost the match with 7–6 penalty shoot-out.

Despite losing in the Charity Shield match, Selangor managed to bring back 1 point for league games. JDT opened the scoring with a goals from Hariss Harun, before Selangor equalized with a free kick from Hafiz Kamal.

On 16 February, Selangor won 1–0 at Perak by goal from Patrick Wleh. Three days later, Selangor faced AirAsia in the FA Cup match, came away with a 2–0 victory, thanks to goals from Patrick Wleh and Hadi Yahya. The victory brought Red Giants qualified to the third round.

On 23 February, Selangor started the 2016 AFC Cup season with visited the Philippines club, Ceres FC. The game ended eventually in a 2–2 draw. Stephan Schröck opened the scoring for Ceres at 18th minute, before Mauro Olivi equalized before half-time. Hafiz Kamal give an advantage to the visitors by scoring the second goal from a free kick, however, the home team finally managed to equalize 2–2 with goals from Adrián Gallardo Valdés at 87th minute.

Back to the league campaign, Selangor then beat Pahang 1–3 away through goal from Winger R. Gopinathan and a brace from Patrick Wleh.

=== March ===
On 1 March, Selangor opened the new month with a 4–2 victory against Sarawak at home with goals from Gopinathan, Azrif and a brace from Patrick Wleh. With their first win at home, this was the team's third-consecutive win in the league and they've been on top of the table after four matches.

Three days later, despite goal from Patrick Wleh, Selangor fell to PDRM 2–1 in the FA Cup third round, causing the Red Giants were eliminated again in this competition.

On 8 March, in its second match in the AFC Cup, Selangor lost 0–1 at home to Tampines Rovers; the only goal scored from the away team came from Fazrul Nawaz.

Three days later in Kuala Terengganu in Terengganu, The Red Giants were soundly defeated 3–1 by Terengganu to suffer their first league defeat and drop out of first place in the table. The loss also meant that Selangor suffered with the third-straight defeat after three games (FA Cup, AFC Cup and Super League).

On 15 March, Selangor flew to the Bangabandhu National Stadium to play the third match of the AFC Cup group stage against Sheikh Jamal Dhanmondi. Selangor won the match 4–3 as Olivi scored double and Gopinathan and Patrick Wleh each scored once. This was the Red Giant's first victory in an international club competition after two matches.

=== April ===
On 5 April after international break, Selangor played against Kedah at home. The teams drew 2–2, with goals from Gopinathan and Patrick Wleh.

On 8 April, Selangor lost to FELDA United away at the Tun Abdul Razak Stadium by a score of 3–1. The lone Selangor goal was scored by Patrick Wleh.

Four days later, Selangor continued secure a win in the AFC Cup match, defeated Sheikh Jamal Dhamondi 2–1 at home, in their fourth group match; with a goals from Hazwan Bakri and a late goal from Patrick Wleh.

On 20 April, Selangor defeated Penang 1–0 at home with the only goal came from Mauro Olivi. Three days later, Selangor drop their points again after a goalless draw with PDRM at Hang Jebat Stadium. On the league table, that result saw Selangor fell to fourth placed again.

On 26 April, Selangor failed to seize the opportunity to clinch a spot in knockout rounds of the AFC Cup, after the match against Ceres FC ended with a goalless draw at home.

=== May ===
On 4 May, Selangor faced T–Team with comeback to original home, Shah Alam Stadium. The Red Giants defeated the visitors 2–1 with a goals from Olivi and a late goal from Adam Nor Azlin to reach the next victory in league.

On 10 May, Selangor loss 1–0 against Tampines Rovers in the last match of group stage at National Stadium, Singapore. The loss meant that Selangor failed to progress past the group stage of the AFC Cup for the second time in 3 years after last time qualified for the knockout rounds in 2013.

Back into the league campaign, Selangor once again ended with a goalless draw, this time against Kelantan at home. That match was the last match of the first round in the league, with Selangor recording the record of 5 wins, 4 draws and 2 defeats.

On 21 May, Selangor started the second round of the league, faced Kelantan again, as a visitor. Selangor went on to win the match 5–2, with a five lone goals from Hafiz Kamal, Gopinathan, Nazmi Faiz, Razman Roslan and Hazwan Bakri. The victory was the first biggest away win for Selangor, and also the team's last game in this month, before the league will take a long break to celebrate Ramadan.

On 23 May, as defending champions, Selangor were drawn into Group B of the Malaysia Cup alongside Kelantan, Pahang, and Kuala Lumpur.

=== July ===
On 12 July after a long break for a month, Selangor start the Malaysia Cup campaign as the defending champions, with the first match against Kuala Lumpur in the group stage. The supersub Adam Nor Azlin came to Selangor's rescue with a late goal at 88th minute as they won the first Klang Valley Derby in four years, to give the defending Malaysia Cup champions a winning start.

In Super League on 16 July, Selangor won the match after defeating PDRM at home 2–1. PDRM advance ahead through a goal from de Paula, followed by equalizer from Hazwan Bakri after the break, before late goals from Ugo Ukah brought victory for Selangor to strengthen position league in the third place.

In its second match in the Malaysia Cup, Selangor tied with Kelantan 3–3 at home, with Selangor's goals scored by Mauro Olivi and Patrick Wleh's brace, and Kelantan's goals scored by Wander Luiz, Wan Zack Haikal, with substitute Abdul Manaf Mamat scoring the late equaliser for the visitor.

In the fourteen round of league, on 23 July, Selangor meet Penang at away. Penang's import player from Korea Jeong Seok-Min put his team in the lead, but Patrick Wleh levelled for Red Giants, with the match finishing in a 1–1 draw.

Three days later, Selangor hosted FELDA United at Shah Alam Stadium. The visitors took the lead in the 3rd minute through Francis Forkey Doe, but Selangor equalized with Patrick Wleh goal at the 63rd minute. However, FELDA United hit back immediately, with Forkey Doe scores again to grabbing the winner for visitors, as Zainal Abidin' side slipped to their first home defeat in the league.

At the end of the month, Selangor played its third match in the Malaysia Cup group stage, against Pahang at the Darul Makmur Stadium. Selangor's losing streak continued as they experienced their first defeat in this competition; a single goal from Matthew Davies decided the outcome of the match. With the loss, Selangor stay in the second position of the group stage behind Kelantan with 3 points difference.

=== August ===
On 3 August, Selangor suffered its second loss in the league at the hands of T–Team, with a goal by Makan Konate deciding the match.

Three days later, Selangor once again failed to reach the victory after losing 1–0 to Kedah in the 17th league match at Darul Aman Stadium. The only goal scored from the home team came from Bang Seung-Hwan. With the loss, this is the team's third defeat in the league and gather fourth straight defeat overall, including a 1–0 loss to Pahang in the Malaysia Cup, 30 July.

The next day, Selangor officially made the decision to terminate the contract with coach Zainal Abidin Hassan, following the team's diminishing performance in the last four consecutive games. Assistant coach K. Gunalan will serve as interim coach until Selangor find a permanent replacement.

On 9 August after the dismissal of Zainal Abidin, The Red Giants continued their Malaysia Cup campaign in the fourth match of the group stage, and finally clinched victory after beating Pahang 3–0 at home. Patrick Wleh scored a hat-trick to ensure the victory for the Red Giants, and become the first player to score a hat-trick for the team this season.

In the fifth match of the Malaysia Cup group stage, played on 12 August, Selangor defeated Kelantan 4–1 at the Sultan Muhammad IV Stadium. The goal given by Wan Zaharulnizam for Kelantan did not last long, as goals from Hadi Yahya, Patrick Wleh and a brace from Gopinathan gave Selangor win. The victory sealed their place in the quarter-finals.

On 16 August, back to the Super League campaign, Selangor could only draw 1–1 with Terengganu at home, with goals by Ashaari Shamsuddin (64th minute) for Terengganu and Andik Vermansyah (84th minute) for Selangor. The failure of the team to achieve a win in five league games, saw them now down to fourth in the league table.

On 20 August, Selangor played last match of the 2016 Malaysia Cup group stage, against Kuala Lumpur at Selayang Stadium (away). The Red Giants managed to get a 1–1 draw with the goal being scored by Hazwan Bakri, ensuring their in the top spot of Group B.

On 23 August, Selangor visited Sarawak in the matchday 19 of the league. After the scoring from Sarawak foreign players Juninho, a goal from Adam Nor Azlin was not enough to bring the victory against the home team. The match finishing in a 1–1 draw.

On 28 August, Selangor defeated PKNS at the Shah Alam Stadium with a 3–4 win in their Malaysia Cup first leg encounter to move closer to qualifying for the semi-finals. Ugo Ukah, Hazwan Bakri, Gopinathan and Olivi scored for Selangor.

=== September ===
On 10 September, Selangor suffered again with a 0–1 loss against Pahang at home, almost damaged the hopes for Red Giants to climb up the third place in the league. Pablo Vranjicán provided the goals for visitors to win the match. This is the second defeat at home to Selangor, where they still failed to win after six games in league matches.

On 18 September, Selangor advanced to the Malaysia Cup semi-finals with a 1–0 victory (5–3 on aggregate) over PKNS. The goal were scored by Nazmi Faiz Mansor, and they get closer to retaining the trophy they won last year.

On 24 September, Selangor were down into fifth place Super League after losing 1–0 to Perak, and again lost at home for the third time. Visitors gained the winning goal through's own goal from Ugo Ukah in the 48th minute. With only one more league matches, Selangor could not afford to bypass the third-placed team, Kedah, and had to be content to be under the top three.

=== October ===
On 1 October, Selangor played the first leg of the semi-finals of the Malaysia Cup against T–Team, winning 2–1 at home. Ugo Ukah's late winner helped settle the tie after Patrick Cruz (T–Team) and Hazwan Bakri have both scored in the first half.

On 15 October, Selangor made it to the Malaysia Cup final for the second time after beating T–Team 3–0, in the second leg of the semi-final at Sultan Ismail Nasiruddin Shah Stadium, Kuala Terengganu. Goals from Gopinathan, Ugo Ukah and Andik Vermansyah was enough to take the team to the finals, beating opponents with a 5–1 aggregate. Selangor once again will face Kedah in the final for the second time after both teams met in last season's final, which Selangor won 2–0.

On 22 October, Selangor played their last league game of the season at home with lost 1–2 against Johor Darul Ta'zim. After the visitors took the early lead with goal from Jorge Pereyra Díaz, Hazwan Bakri scored the equalizer before former Selangor player Amri Yahyah scored the decisive goal 12 minutes before the end of the match. With the defeat, Selangor finished fifth with 28 points and also collecting a record 7 wins, 7 draws and 8 defeats.

On 30 October 2016, Selangor played the 2016 Malaysia Cup Final against Kedah. Selangor failed to defend the title after the match ended with 1–1 after extra time, but Kedah won a 6–5 on penalties. Selangor goal scored by Hazwan Bakri, while Kedah's goals were scored by Rizal Ghazali. That match was the last match for both teams to close the curtains Malaysia League 2016.

== Kit ==
Supplier: Lotto / Sponsor: Selangor

Home	Away	Third	Goalkeeper

== Players ==
=== First Team squad ===
No.	Name	Nationality	Position(s)	Since	Signed from
Goalkeepers
22	Norazlan Razali	(Malaysia)	GK	2015	Johor Darul Ta'zim
1	Khairulazhan Khalid	(Malaysia)	GK	2016	Pahang
30	Zarif Irfan	(Malaysia)	GK	2016	AirAsia
Defenders
3	Azmi Muslim	(Malaysia)	LB / CB	2014	FELDA United
5	Shahrom Kalam (Captain)	(Malaysia)	CB / DM	2014	Perak
12	Bunyamin Umar	(Malaysia)	CB / RB / DM	2009	UPB-MyTeam
13	Razman Roslan (Vice-captain)	(Malaysia)	CB	2016	Pahang
15	Raimi Mohd Nor	(Malaysia)	LB / RB	2013	FELDA United
17	Rizal Fahmi	(Malaysia)	CB / RB	2014	Kelantan
18	Ugo Ukah	(Nigeria)	CB	2016	(Greece) AEL Kalloni
19	S. Subramaniam	(Malaysia)	CB	2015	Johor Darul Ta'zim
Midfielders
7	Andik Vermansyah	(Indonesia)	LW / RW / F9	2014	(Indonesia) Persebaya 1927
11	Hazwan Bakri	(Malaysia)	RW / LW / F9	2015	Harimau Muda A
10	Nazmi Faiz	(Malaysia)	CM / CAM	2014	PKNS
16	Saiful Ridzuwan	(Malaysia)	DM / CM	2015	Harimau Muda A
21	Hafiz Kamal	(Malaysia)	CAM / CM / CDM	2016	Pahang
23	S. Veenod	(Malaysia)	CM / RM / LM	2012	USM
24	Fitri Shazwan	(Malaysia)	LW / RW / CM / CAM	2006	President's Cup
25	R. Gopinathan	(Malaysia)	RW / LW / AM	2016	Pahang
Forwards
14	Hadi Yahya	(Malaysia)	ST	2014	Perak
16	Mauro Olivi	(Argentina)	SS / ST	2016	(Peru) León de Huánuco
4	Patrick Wleh	(Liberia)	CF	2016	PKNS
9	Adam Nor Azlin	(Malaysia)	CAM / ST	2016	Harimau Muda A
Player left the club during the season
2	Robert Cornthwaite	(Australia)	CB	2015	(South Korea) Jeonnam Dragons
20	Azrif Nasrulhaq	(Malaysia)	RB / RM	2015	Harimau Muda A

=== Reserve Team squad ===
No.	Name	Nationality	Position(s)	Since	Signed from
Youth System
31"	Faizzudin Abidin	(Malaysia)	RW / LW / AM	2016	President's Cup
31"	Syukri Azman	(Malaysia)	LB / LWB	2016	Youth system
32	Arunasalam Namathevan	(Malaysia)	RB / RWB	2016	Youth system
33	Badrul Amin	(Malaysia)	ST / CF	2016	Youth system
35	Kannan Kalaiselvan	(Malaysia)	LB / LWB / LW / RW	2016	Youth system

" Share jersey numbers

== Transfers ==
=== First transfers ===
23 November 2015 – 14 February 2016

==== Transfers in ====
Date	No.	Pos.	Name	Age	Moving from	Type	Transfer fee	Team	Ref.
18 December 2015	1	GK	(Malaysia) Khairulazhan Khalid	26	(Malaysia) Pahang	Transfer	€10,000	First team	
18 December 2015	13	DF	(Malaysia) Razman Roslan	30	(Malaysia) Pahang	Contract expired	Free transfer	First team	
18 December 2015	21	MF	(Malaysia) Hafiz Kamal	28	(Malaysia) Pahang	Transfer	€11,000	First team	
18 December 2015	25	MF	(Malaysia) R. Gopinathan	25	(Malaysia) Pahang	Transfer	€18,000	First team	
18 December 2015	30	GK	(Malaysia) Zarif Irfan	20	(Malaysia) AirAsia	Contract expired	Free transfer	First team	
12 January 2016	16	FW	(Argentina) Mauro Olivi	32	(Peru) León de Huánuco	Transfer	Undisclosed	First team	
2 February 2016	9	MF	(Malaysia) Adam Nor Azlin	19	(Malaysia) Harimau Muda A	—	Free transfer	First team	

==== Loans in ====
Date	No.	Pos.	Name	Age	Loaned from	Type	On loan until	Transfer fee	Team	Ref.
21 January 2016	4	FW	(Liberia) Patrick Wleh	24	(Malaysia) PKNS	Loan	End of season	Free transfer	First team	

==== Transfers out ====
Date	No.	Pos.	Name	Age	Moving to	Type	Transfer fee	Team	Ref.
14 December 2015	25	MF	(Malaysia) K. Gurusamy	26	(Malaysia) Sarawak	Contract expired	Free transfer	First team	
18 December 2015	8	MF	(Brazil) Leandro Dos Santos	28	(Brazil) Luverdense	Contract expired	Free transfer	First team	
18 December 2015	9	FW	(Malaysia) A. Thamil Arasu	24	(Malaysia) Kuala Lumpur	Contract expired	Free transfer	First team	
18 December 2015	13	FW	(Brazil) Guilherme de Paula	28	(Cyprus) Ethnikos Achna	Contract expired	Free transfer	First team	
18 December 2015	21	GK	(Malaysia) Hamsani Ahmad	38	—	Retired	—	First team	N/A
23 December 2015	18	MF	(Malaysia) K. Thanaraj	29	(Malaysia) Sarawak	Contract expired	Free transfer	First team	
31 December 2015	1	GK	(Malaysia) Syamim Othman	25	(Malaysia) Negeri Sembilan	Contract expired	Free transfer	First team	
31 December 2015	4	DF	(Malaysia) Shazlan Alias	25	(Malaysia) Negeri Sembilan	Contract expired	Free transfer	First team	
31 December 2015	19	FW	(Malaysia) Afiq Azmi	26	(Malaysia) Negeri Sembilan	Contract expired	Free transfer	First team	

=== Second transfers ===
20 Jun – 15 July 2016

==== Transfers in ====
Date	No.	Pos.	Name	Age	Moving from	Type	Transfer fee	Team	Ref.
9 July 2016	18	DF	(Nigeria) Ugo Ukah	32	(Greece) AEL Kalloni	Contract expired	Free transfer	First team	

==== Transfers out ====
Date	No.	Pos.	Name	Age	Moving to	Type	Transfer fee	Team	Ref.
5 July 2016	2	DF	(Australia) Robert Cornthwaite	30	(Australia) Western Sydney Wanderers	Released	Undisclosed	First team	
14 July 2016	20	DF	(Malaysia) Azrif Nasrulhaq	25	(Malaysia) Johor Darul Ta'zim	Transfer	£130,450	First team	

== Pre-season and friendlies ==
19 January 2016 Friendly	Selangor (Malaysia)	2–0	(Malaysia) Sarawak	Selayang, Selangor
20:45 UTC+08:00	Wleh 61'; Hafiz 64'	Report		Stadium: Selayang Stadium; Attendance: 5,000; Referee: S. Logeswaran

26 January 2016 Friendly	Selangor (Malaysia)	2–1	(Malaysia) Kuala Lumpur	Selayang, Selangor
20:45 UTC+08:00	Olivi 52'; Wleh 72'	Report	Anselmo 49'	Stadium: Selayang Stadium; Attendance: 4,000; Referee: Tuan Mohd Yassin

28 January 2016 Friendly	Penang (Malaysia)	1–0	(Malaysia) Selangor	George Town, Penang
20:45 UTC+08:00	Jafri 83'	Report		Stadium: Penang City Stadium; Attendance: 10,000; Referee: Nazmi Nasaruddin

31 January 2016 Friendly	Nakhon Pathom (Thailand)	2–0	(Malaysia) Selangor	Nakhon Pathom, Thailand
20:45 UTC+08:00				Stadium: Nakhon Pathom Municipality Sport School Stadium

1 February 2016 Friendly	Samut Songkhram R-Airlines (Thailand)	4–2	(Malaysia) Selangor	Samut Songkram, Thailand
20:45 UTC+08:00				Stadium: Samut Songkhram Stadium

== Competitions ==
=== Overview ===
Competition	First match	Last match	Starting round	Final position	Record							
Competition	First match	Last match	Starting round	Final position	Pld	W	D	L	GF	GA	GD	Win %
Malaysia Super League (Note: Includes the Charity Shield.)	13 February 2016	22 October 2016	Matchday 1	5th	22	7	7	8	28	27	+1	31.82
Malaysia FA Cup	19 February 2016	4 March 2016	Second Round	Third round	2	1	0	1	3	2	+1	50.00
Malaysia Cup	12 July 2016	30 October 2016	Group stage	Runners-up	11	7	3	1	23	11	+12	63.64
AFC Cup	23 February 2016	10 May 2016	Group stage	Group stage	6	2	2	2	8	8	+0	33.33
Total					41	17	12	12	62	48	+14	41.46

Last updated: 30 October 2016
Source: Competitions

=== Malaysia Charity Shield ===
13 February 2016	Johor Darul Ta'zim	1–1 (7–6 p)	Selangor	Johor Bahru, Johor
20:45 UTC+08:00	Hariss 45'; Fazly (yellow card) 86'	Report	Nazmi (yellow card) 45+3'; Hafiz 60'	Stadium: Larkin Stadium; Attendance: 26,800; Referee: Syed Azhar Syed Kamar
	Penalties
	(penalty scored) Safiq; (penalty missed) Díaz; (penalty scored) Nazrin; (penalty scored) Amirul; (penalty scored) Hariss; (penalty missed) Azamuddin; (penalty scored) Marcos Antonio; (penalty scored) Aidil; (penalty scored) Kunanlan		(penalty missed) Olivi; (penalty scored) Wleh; (penalty scored) Veenod; (penalty scored) Hafiz; (penalty scored) Razman; (penalty missed) Gopinathan; (penalty scored) Shahrom; (penalty scored) Raimi; (penalty missed) Azrif

=== Malaysia Super League ===
==== Table ====
Pos	Team	Pld	W	D	L	GF	GA	GD	Pts
3	Kedah	22	11	7	4	30	26	+4	37 (Note: Kedah Football Association (Kedah FA) has been found guilty of putting the suspended player during the match against Pahang on August 3, 2016. Therefore, the Football Association of Malaysia (FAM) has been awarded 3 points for Pahang and Kedah sentenced deducted 3 points for the incident.)
4	Kelantan	22	7	8	7	37	33	+4	29
5	Selangor	22	7	7	8	28	27	+1	28
6	Perak	22	7	7	8	29	30	−1	28
7	T–Team	22	7	6	9	30	34	−4	27

Source: SPMB Football Association of Malaysia, Football Malaysia LLP
Rules for classification: 1) Points; 2) Goal difference; 3) Number of goals scored; 3) Number of goals against.

==== Results summary ====
Overall								Home						Away					
Pld	W	D	L	GF	GA	GD	Pts	W	D	L	GF	GA	GD	W	D	L	GF	GA	GD
22	7	7	8	28	27	+1	28	4	3	4	14	13	+1	3	4	4	14	14	0

Source: Super League fixtures and results

==== Results by matchday ====
Round	1	2	3	4	5	6	7	8	9	10	11	12	13	14	15	16	17	18	19	20	21	22
Ground	A	A	A	H	A	H	A	H	A	H	H	A	H	A	H	A	A	H	A	H	H	H
Result	D	W	W	W	L	D	L	W	D	W	D	W	W	D	L	L	L	D	D	L	L	L
Position	7	3	3	1	3	3	4	3	4	3	3	3	3	3	3	3	3	4	4	4	5	5

Source: Super League fixtures and results
A = Away; H = Home; W = Win; D = Draw; L = Loss

==== League Matches ====
Win Draw Loss

13 February 2016 1	Johor Darul Ta'zim	1–1	Selangor	Johor Bahru, Johor
20:45 UTC+08:00	Hariss 45'; Fazly (yellow card) 86'	Report	Nazmi (yellow card) 45+3'; Hafiz 60'	Stadium: Larkin Stadium; Attendance: 26,800; Referee: Syed Azhar Syed Kamar

16 February 2016 2	Perak	0–1	Selangor	Ipoh, Perak
20:45 UTC+08:00	Thiago (yellow card) 60'	Report	Hafiz (yellow card) 17'; Saiful (yellow card) 75'; Azrif (yellow card) 80'; Wleh 8' (pen.) (yellow card) 90+2'	Stadium: Perak Stadium; Attendance: 17,300; Referee: Zohri Tajuddin

27 February 2016 3	Pahang	1–3	Selangor	Kuantan, Pahang
20:45 UTC+08:00	Faisal 13'	Report	Wleh 37', 45+2'; Gopinathan 67'	Stadium: Darul Makmur Stadium; Attendance: 10,013; Referee: Nafeez Abd Wahab

1 March 2016 4	Selangor	4–2	Sarawak	Selayang, Selangor
20:45 UTC+08:00	Gopinathan 25'; Wleh 28', 56'; Azrif 67'	Report	Juninho 7'; Gurusamy (yellow card) 59'; Gilmar 76' (pen.)	Stadium: Selayang Stadium; Attendance: 6,200; Referee: Zamzaidi Katimin

11 March 2016 5	Terengganu	3–1	Selangor	Kuala Terengganu, Terengganu
20:45 UTC+08:00	Issey 45+1', 88'; Sharin (yellow card) 51'; Morales 80'	Report	Gopinathan 46'	Stadium: Sultan Mizan Zainal Abidin Stadium; Attendance: 7,200; Referee: Zohri Tajuddin

5 April 2016 6	Selangor	2–2	Kedah	Selayang, Selangor
20:45 UTC+08:00	Nazmi (yellow card) 24'; Gopinathan 30'; Wleh 31'; Hafiz (yellow card) 57'; Raimi (yellow card) 66'; Adam (yellow card) 90+2'	Report	Syazwan Zainon 7'; Sandro 67' (pen.); Syazwan Tajuddin (yellow card) 85'	Stadium: Majlis Perbandaran Selayang Stadium; Attendance: 8,063; Referee: Nazmi Nasaruddin

8 April 2016 7	FELDA United	3–1	Selangor	Jengka, Pahang
20:45 UTC+08:00	Hadin 9'; Zah Rahan 75'; Forkey Doe 77'; Hasnizaidi (yellow card) 90+2'	Report	Hafiz (yellow card) 54'; Wleh 71' (yellow card) 85'; Azrif (yellow card) 90+2'	Stadium: Tun Abdul Razak Stadium; Attendance: 10,385; Referee: Zamzaidi Katimin

20 April 2016 8	Selangor	1–0	Penang	Selayang, Selangor
20:45 UTC+08:00	Olivi 17'; Cornthwaite (yellow card) 33'	Report	Mafry (yellow card) 26'; Darwira (yellow card) 31'; Fitri (yellow card) 84'	Stadium: Majlis Perbandaran Selayang Stadium; Attendance: 3,234; Referee: Amirul Izwan Yaacob

23 April 2016 9	PDRM	0–0	Selangor	Krubong, Malacca
20:45 UTC+08:00	Reuben (yellow card) 32'; Safuwan (yellow card) 75'; Safwan (yellow card) 78'	Report	Saiful (yellow card) 45+2'; Nazmi (red card) 70'	Stadium: Hang Jebat Stadium; Attendance: 2,000; Referee: Nafeez Abd Wahab

4 May 2016 10	Selangor	2–1	T–Team	Shah Alam, Selangor
20:45 UTC+08:00	Olivi 55'; Raimi (yellow card) 81'; Adam 90+3'	Report	Takhiyuddin (yellow card) 45+1'; Cruz 54'	Stadium: Shah Alam Stadium; Attendance: 4,981; Referee: Khirulazuan Kidam

18 May 2016 11	Selangor	0–0	Kelantan	Shah Alam, Selangor
20:45 UTC+08:00		Report	Zack (red card) 27'; Brendan (yellow card) 81'	Stadium: Shah Alam Stadium; Attendance: 9,731; Referee: Syed Azhar Syed Kamar

21 May 2016 12	Kelantan	2–5	Selangor	Kota Bharu, Kelantan
20:45 UTC+08:00	Ilijoski 10'; Traore 60'; Zaharulnizam (red card) 61'; Qayyum (yellow card) 80'	Report	Hafiz 15' (yellow card) 25'; Gopinathan 21'; Nazmi 36'; Razman 50'; Norazlan (yellow card) 79'; Hazwan 88'	Stadium: Sultan Muhammad IV Stadium; Attendance: 17,653; Referee: Amirul Izwan Yaacob

16 July 2016 13	Selangor	2–1	PDRM	Shah Alam, Selangor
20:45 UTC+08:00	Hazwan 52' (yellow card) 90+3'; Ukah 90'	Report	de Paula 28'; Konaté (yellow card) 52'; Eskandar (yellow card) 74'; Andrezinho (yellow card) 86'	Stadium: Shah Alam Stadium; Attendance: 2,755; Referee: Zulkifli Ahmad

23 July 2016 14	Penang	1–1	Selangor	George Town, Penang
20:45 UTC+08:00	Seok Min 26' (yellow card) 80'; Faizat (yellow card) 45+1'	Report	Veenod (yellow card) 20'; Wleh 33'; Olivi (yellow card) 39'	Stadium: City Stadium; Attendance: 5,875; Referee: Amirul Izwan Yaacob

26 July 2016 15	Selangor	1–2	FELDA United	Shah Alam, Selangor
20:45 UTC+08:00	Razman (yellow card) 43'; Wleh 63'; Hazwan (yellow card) 90+1'	Report	Forkey Doe 3', 71'	Stadium: Shah Alam Stadium; Attendance: 3,729; Referee: Fairuzi Mat Desa

3 August 2016 16	T–Team	1–0	Selangor	Kuala Terengganu, Terengganu
20:45 UTC+08:00	Konate 37'; Maiga (yellow card) 90+1'	Report	Hafiz (yellow card) 85'	Stadium: Sultan Ismail Nasiruddin Shah Stadium; Attendance: 761; Referee: Teoh Hee Loon

6 August 2016 17	Kedah	1–0	Selangor	Alor Setar, Kedah
20:45 UTC+08:00	Seung-Hwan 47'	Report		Stadium: Darul Aman Stadium; Attendance: 10,064; Referee: Zamzaidi Katimin

16 August 2016 18	Selangor	1–1	Terengganu	Shah Alam, Selangor
20:45 UTC+08:00	Saiful (yellow card) 14'; Andik 84'	Report	Hafizal (yellow card) 23'; Ashaari 65'	Stadium: Shah Alam Stadium; Attendance: 2,379; Referee: Nafeez Abd Wahab

23 August 2016 19	Sarawak	1–1	Selangor	Kuching, Sarawak
20:45 UTC+08:00	Shreen (yellow card) 61'; Shahrol (yellow card) 67'; Juninho 40' (pen.) (yellow card) 73'	Report	Razman (yellow card) 42'; Adam 76'; Ukah (red card) 90+2'	Stadium: Sarawak State Stadium; Attendance: 548; Referee: Zulkifli Ahmad

10 September 2016 20	Selangor	0–1	Pahang	Shah Alam, Selangor
20:45 UTC+08:00		Report	Vranjicán 33'	Stadium: Shah Alam Stadium; Attendance: 1,647; Referee: Zulkifli Ahmad

24 September 2016 21	Selangor	0–1	Perak	Shah Alam, Selangor
20:45 UTC+08:00	Ukah (yellow card) 22' (yellow-red card) 82'; Razman (yellow card) 70'; Saiful (yellow card) 71'	Report	Raffi (yellow card) 25'; Ukah 49' (o.g.); Kilichev (yellow card) 70'; Pallraj (yellow card) 86'	Stadium: Shah Alam Stadium; Attendance: 3,295; Referee: Nafeez Abd Wahab

22 October 2016 22	Selangor	1–2	Johor Darul Ta'zim	Shah Alam, Selangor
20:45 UTC+08:00	Hazwan 71' (yellow card) 75'; Veenod (yellow card) 82'; Hafiz (yellow card) 83'; Raimi (yellow card) 85'	Report	Díaz 65' (yellow card) 82'; Amri (yellow card) 50' (goal) 78'; Eldstal (yellow card) 78'	Stadium: Shah Alam Stadium; Attendance: 8,929; Referee: Nazmi Nasaruddin

==== Results overview ====
Win Draw Loss

Team	Home score	Away score	Double
FELDA United	1–2	1–3	2–5
Johor Darul Ta'zim	1–2	1–1	2–3
Kedah	2–2	0–1	2–3
Kelantan	0–0	5–2	5–2
Pahang	0–1	3–1	3–2
PDRM	2–1	0–0	2–1
Penang	1–0	1–1	2–1
Perak	0–1	1–0	1–1
Sarawak	4–2	1–1	5–3
T–Team	2–1	0–1	2–2
Terengganu	1–1	1–3	2–4

=== FA Cup ===
19 February 2016 Second Round	AirAsia Allstar	0–2	Selangor	Paroi, Seremban, Negeri Sembilan
20:45 UTC+08:00	Hafiszuan (yellow card) 36'; Rosli (yellow card) 70'	Report	Wleh 69'; Hadi 77'	Stadium: Tuanku Abdul Rahman Stadium; Attendance: 2,500; Referee: Azham Musa

4 March 2016 Third Round	PDRM	2–1	Selangor	Krubong, Malacca
20:45 UTC+08:00	Nizam 38'; Latiff (yellow card) 43'; Reuben (yellow card) 53'; Safuwan 58' (yellow card) 75'	Report	Azrif (yellow card) 26'; Azmi (yellow card) 74'; Razman (yellow card) 84'; Wleh 86'	Stadium: Hang Jebat Stadium; Attendance: 2,000; Referee: S. Sittharanjanan

=== Malaysia Cup ===
Selangor joined the competition in the group stage.

==== Group stage ====
Pos	Team	Pld	W	D	L	GF	GA	GD	Pts	Qualification	SEL	KEL	PHG	KLU
1	Selangor	6	3	2	1	12	6	+6	11	Advance to knockout phase	—	3–3	3–0	1–0
2	Kelantan	6	3	1	2	7	9	−2	10	Advance to knockout phase	1–4	—	1–0	1–0
3	Pahang	6	3	0	3	5	7	−2	9		1–0	2–0	—	2–1
4	Kuala Lumpur	6	1	1	4	4	6	−2	4		1–1	0–1	2–0	—

Updated to match(es) played on 20 August 2016. Source: FAM FMLLP

12 July 2016 1	Selangor	1–0	Kuala Lumpur	Shah Alam, Selangor
21:00 UTC+8	Raimi (yellow card) 13'; Azrif (yellow card) 24'; Adam 88'	Report	Irfan (yellow card) 45+1'; Nazri (yellow card) 79'; Rasyid (yellow card) 90+5'	Stadium: Shah Alam Stadium; Attendance: 3,371; Referee: Fitri Maskon

20 July 2016 2	Selangor	3–3	Kelantan	Shah Alam, Selangor
21:00 UTC+8	Olivi 30'; Nazmi (yellow card) 56'; Wleh 39', 49' (yellow card) 60'; Ukah (yellow card) 69'	Report	Wander Luiz 45+1'; Qayyum (yellow card) 53'; Zack 72'; Ilijoski (yellow card) 90+3'; Manaf 90+8'	Stadium: Shah Alam Stadium; Attendance: 9,895; Referee: Nazmi Nasaruddin

30 July 2016 3	Pahang	1–0	Selangor	Kuantan, Pahang
21:00 UTC+8	Davies 32'; Saiful (yellow card) 81'; Meneses (yellow card) 85'	Report	Saiful (yellow card) 55'; Ukah (yellow card) 85'	Stadium: Darul Makmur Stadium; Attendance: 3,027; Referee: Zohri Tajuddin

9 August 2016 4	Selangor	3–0	Pahang	Shah Alam, Selangor
21:00 UTC+8	Wleh 37' (pen.), 66', 81'	Report	Jailton (yellow card) 43'; Salamon (yellow card) 75'	Stadium: Shah Alam Stadium; Attendance: 1,887; Referee: Amirul Izwan Yaacob

12 August 2016 5	Kelantan	1–4	Selangor	Kota Bharu, Kelantan
21:00 UTC+8	Zaharulnizam 36' (pen.)	Report	Hadi 22' (pen.); Gopinathan 24', 57'; Wleh 27'; Bunyamin (yellow card) 14' (yellow-red card) 47'	Stadium: Sultan Muhammad IV Stadium; Attendance: 5,474; Referee: S. Sittharanjanan

20 August 2016 6	Kuala Lumpur	1–1	Selangor	Selayang, Selangor
21:00 UTC+8	Arif (yellow card) 40'; Fahrul 42'; Nazri (yellow card) 70'	Report	Hazwan 68'	Stadium: Majlis Perbandaran Selayang Stadium; Attendance: 1,525; Referee: Ismail Asib Md. Amin

==== Quarter-finals ====
28 August 2016 First leg	PKNS	3–4	Selangor	Shah Alam, Selangor
21:00 UTC+8	Nizam (yellow card) 4'; Cobelli 28'; Soto 60'; Guerra 74'; Khairu (yellow card) 82'	Report	Ukah 5'; Hazwan 24'; Saiful (yellow card) 29'; Gopinathan 52'; Olivi 85'	Stadium: Shah Alam Stadium; Attendance: 2,712; Referee: Nazmi Nasaruddin

18 September 2016 Second leg	Selangor	1–0 (5–3 agg.)	PKNS	Shah Alam, Selangor
21:00 UTC+8	Nazmi 55'; Saiful (yellow card) 78'	Report	Nizam (yellow card) 18'; Shahrul (yellow card) 76'	Stadium: Shah Alam Stadium; Attendance: 3,227; Referee: Fairuzi Mat Desa

==== Semi-finals ====
1 October 2016 First leg	Selangor	2–1	T–Team	Shah Alam, Selangor
21:00 UTC+8	Bunyamin (yellow card) 15'; Hazwan (yellow card) 44' (goal) 45+3'; Ukah 80'	Report	Cruz 22' (pen.); Maïga (yellow card) 71'; Safawi (yellow card) 84'; Konaté (yellow card) 90+2'	Stadium: Shah Alam Stadium; Attendance: 15,186; Referee: Syed Azhar Syed Kamar

15 October 2016 Second leg	T–Team	0–3 (1–5 agg.)	Selangor	Kuala Terengganu, Terengganu
21:00 UTC+8	Safawi (yellow card) 52'	Report	Gopinathan 2'; Ukah 19'; Saiful (yellow card) 30'; Azmi (yellow card) 55'; Andik 90+2'	Stadium: Sultan Ismail Nasiruddin Shah Stadium; Attendance: 12,500; Referee: Zamzaidi Katimin

==== Final ====
30 October 2016 Final	Kedah	1–1 (6–5 p)	Selangor	Shah Alam, Selangor
21:00 UTC+8	Rizal 52'	Report	Hazwan (yellow card) 13' (goal) 60'	Stadium: Shah Alam Stadium; Attendance: 79,782; Referee: Amirul Izwan Yaacob
	Penalties
	Smeltz (penalty missed); Seung-Hwan (penalty scored); Farhan (penalty scored); Krasniqi (penalty scored); Baddrol (penalty scored); Amirul (penalty missed); Halim (penalty scored); Rizal Ghazali (penalty scored)		(penalty scored) Ukah; (penalty scored) Wleh; (penalty missed) Azmi; (penalty scored) Olivi; (penalty scored) Veenod; (penalty missed) Hafiz; (penalty scored) Andik; (penalty missed) Rizal Fahmi

=== AFC Cup ===
==== Group stage ====
Pos	Team	Pld	W	D	L	GF	GA	GD	Pts	Qualification	CER	TAM	SEL	SJD
1	(Philippines) Ceres	6	3	3	0	12	4	+8	12	Knockout stage	—	2–1	2–2	5–0
2	(Singapore) Tampines Rovers	6	3	1	2	10	6	+4	10	Knockout stage	1–1	—	1–0	4–0
3	(Malaysia) Selangor	6	2	2	2	8	8	0	8		0–0	0–1	—	2–1
4	(Bangladesh) Sheikh Jamal Dhanmondi	6	1	0	5	7	19	−12	3		0–2	3–2	3–4	—

Source: AFC
Rules for classification: Group stage tiebreakers

23 February 2016 Group stage	Ceres (Philippines)	2–2	(Malaysia) Selangor	Bacolod, Philippines
19:00 UTC+8	Schröck 18'; Ingreso (yellow card) 27'; Valdés 87'; Kim (yellow card) 89'; Marañón (yellow card) 90+3'	Report	Olivi 34'; Raimi (yellow card) 40'; Hafiz (yellow card) 53' (goal) 60'	Stadium: Panaad Stadium; Attendance: 8,000; Referee: Wang Di (China)

8 March 2016 Group stage	Selangor (Malaysia)	0–1	(Singapore) Tampines Rovers	Selayang, Selangor
20:45 UTC+8	Hafiz (yellow card) 22'; Saiful (yellow card) 40'	Report	Fazrul 26'; Kwon (yellow card) 48'; Ismadi (yellow card) 77'; Afiq (yellow card) 79'	Stadium: Majlis Perbandaran Selayang Stadium; Attendance: 5,985; Referee: Khamis Al-Khuwari (Qatar)

15 March 2016 Group stage	Sheikh Jamal Dhanmondi (Bangladesh)	3–4	(Malaysia) Selangor	Dhaka, Bangladesh
18:30 UTC+6	Darboe 29'; Haque (yellow card) 47'; Onuoha 64'; Anselme 65'	Report	Bunyamin (yellow card) 27'; Wleh 39'; Gopinathan 52'; Olivi 70', 83'	Stadium: Bangabandhu National Stadium; Attendance: 550; Referee: Nivon Robesh Gamini (Sri Lanka)

12 April 2016 Group stage	Selangor (Malaysia)	2–1	(Bangladesh) Sheikh Jamal Dhanmondi	Selayang, Selangor
20:45 UTC+8	Hazwan 16' (yellow card) 53'; Hafiz (red card) 58'; Wleh 89'	Report	Anselme (yellow card) 29'; Darboe 35'; Yeasin (yellow card) 48' (yellow-red card) 70'; Jamal (yellow card) 58'; Maksudur (yellow card) 86'	Stadium: Majlis Perbandaran Selayang Stadium; Attendance: 2,487; Referee: Masaaki Toma (Japan)

26 April 2016 Group stage	Selangor (Malaysia)	0–0	(Philippines) Ceres	Selayang, Selangor
20:45 UTC+8	Olivi (yellow card) 23'; Saiful (yellow card) 65'; Azrif (yellow card) 88'	Report	Son (yellow card) 86'	Stadium: Majlis Perbandaran Selayang Stadium; Attendance: 1,950; Referee: Omar Al-Yaqoubi (Oman)

10 May 2016 Group stage	Tampines Rovers (Singapore)	1–0	(Malaysia) Selangor	Kallang, Singapore
19:30 UTC+8	Yasir 31' (yellow card) 81'; Izzdin (yellow card) 52'; Mehmet (yellow card) 58' (yellow-red card) 86'	Report	Raimi (yellow card) 29'; Wleh (yellow card) 60'; Olivi (yellow card) 86'	Stadium: National Stadium, Singapore; Attendance: 11,875; Referee: Jameel Abdulhusain (Bahrain)

== Statistics ==
=== Squad statistics ===
As of 30 October 2016

Appearances (Apps.) numbers are for appearances in competitive games only including sub appearances.
\ Red card numbers denote: Numbers in parentheses represent red cards overturned for wrongful dismissal.

No.	Nat.	Player	Pos.	Super League (Note: Includes the Charity Shield.)				FA Cup				Malaysia Cup				AFC Cup				Total			
No.	Nat.	Player	Pos.	Apps	Goal	Yellow card	Red card	Apps	Goal	Yellow card	Red card	Apps	Goal	Yellow card	Red card	Apps	Goal	Yellow card	Red card	Apps	Goal	Yellow card	Red card
1	(Malaysia)	Khairulazhan	GK	8				2				8				2				20			
2	(Australia)	Robert Cornthwaite †	DF	8		1										3				11		1	
3	(Malaysia)	Azmi Muslim	DF	9				2		1		7		1		4				22		2	
4	(Liberia)	Patrick Wleh	FW	19	9	2		2	2			10	6	1		6	2	1		37	19	4	
5	(Malaysia)	Shahrom Kalam	DF	13				2				1				6				22			
7	(Indonesia)	Andik Vermansyah	MF	17	1			1				9	1			5				32	2		
8	(Malaysia)	Saiful Ridzuwan	MF	12		4		1				8		4		5		2		26		10	
9	(Malaysia)	Adam Nor Azlin	FW	16	2	1		2				10	1			5				33	3	1	
10	(Malaysia)	Nazmi Faiz	MF	16	1	2	1	1				6	1	1		6				29	2	3	1
11	(Malaysia)	Hazwan Bakri	MF	16	3	3						9	4	2		3	1	1		28	8	6	
12	(Malaysia)	Bunyamin Umar	DF	10				1				9		1	1	2		1		22		2	1
13	(Malaysia)	Razman Roslan	DF	16	1	3		2		1		8				2				28	1	4	
14	(Malaysia)	Hadi Yahya	FW	8				2	1			5	1			2				17	2		
15	(Malaysia)	Raimi Mohd Nor	DF	16		3		2				4		1		2		2		24		6	
16	(Argentina)	Mauro Olivi	FW	17	2	1		1				5	2			5	3	2		28	7	3	
17	(Malaysia)	Rizal Fahmi	DF	8								8				2				18			
18	(Nigeria)	Ugo Ukah	DF	8	1		2					9	3	2						17	4	2	2
19	(Malaysia)	S. Subramaniam	DF									2								2			
20	(Malaysia)	Azrif Nasrulhaq †	DF	11	1	2		2		1		1		1		5		1		19	1	5	
21	(Malaysia)	Hafiz Kamal	MF	17	2	6		2				4				3	1	2	1	26	3	8	1
22	(Malaysia)	Norazlan Razali	GK	14		1						3				4				21		1	
23	(Malaysia)	S. Veenod	MF	17		2		2				11				6				36		2	
24	(Malaysia)	Fitri Shazwan	MF	4								2								6			
25	(Malaysia)	R. Gopinathan	MF	18	5			1				10	4			4	1			33	10		
30	(Malaysia)	Zarif Irfan	GK																				
31"	(Malaysia)	Syukri Azman	DF									1								1			
31"	(Malaysia)	Faizzudin Abidin	MF	3								1								4			
32	(Malaysia)	Arunasalam Namathevan	DF	1								1								2			
33	(Malaysia)	Badrul Amin	FW									1								1			
35	(Malaysia)	Kannan Kalaiselvan	MF	1								1								2			
Own goals					0				0				0				0				0		
Totals					28	31	3		3	3	0		23	14	1		8	12	1		62	60	5

" Share jersey numbers
† Player left the club during the season.

=== Goalscorers ===
Includes all competitive matches.

As of match played 30 October 2016

Rank	Pos.	No.	Player	Super League	FA Cup	Malaysia Cup	AFC Cup	Total
1	FW	4	(Liberia) Patrick Wleh	9	2	6	2	19
2	MF	25	(Malaysia) R. Gopinathan	5	0	4	1	10
3	FW	11	(Malaysia) Hazwan Bakri	3	0	4	1	8
4	FW	16	(Argentina) Mauro Olivi	2	0	2	3	7
5	DF	18	(Nigeria) Ugo Ukah	1	0	3	0	4
6	FW	9	(Malaysia) Adam Nor Azlin	2	0	1	0	3
6	MF	21	(Malaysia) Hafiz Kamal	2	0	0	1	3
8	MF	7	(Indonesia) Andik Vermansyah	1	0	1	0	2
8	MF	10	(Malaysia) Nazmi Faiz	1	0	1	0	2
8	FW	14	(Malaysia) Hadi Yahya	0	1	1	0	2
11	DF	13	(Malaysia) Razman Roslan	1	0	0	0	1
11	DF	20	(Malaysia) Azrif Nasrulhaq †	1	0	0	0	1
Own Goals				0	0	0	0	0
TOTALS				28	3	23	8	62
Own Goals Conceded
1	DF	18	(Nigeria) Ugo Ukah	1	0	0	0	1
TOTALS				1	0	0	0	1

† Player left the club during the season.

=== Top assists ===
Rnk	Pos	No.	Player	Super League	FA Cup	Malaysia Cup	AFC Cup	Total
1	FW	4	(Liberia) Patrick Wleh	2	0	3	3	8
1	MF	7	(Indonesia) Andik Vermansyah	3	1	3	1	8
3	FW	16	(Argentina) Mauro Olivi	4	0	0	1	5
4	MF	25	(Malaysia) R. Gopinathan	3	0	1	0	4
5	FW	9	(Malaysia) Adam Nor Azlin	1	0	1	1	3
6	MF	8	(Malaysia) Nazmi Faiz	2	0	0	0	2
7	GK	1	(Malaysia) Khairulazhan	0	0	1	0	1
7	FW	11	(Malaysia) Hazwan Bakri	0	0	1	0	1
7	DF	15	(Malaysia) Raimi Mohd Nor	0	0	1	0	1
7	DF	20	(Malaysia) Azrif Nasrulhaq †	1	0	0	0	1
7	MF	21	(Malaysia) Hafiz Kamal	1	0	0	0	1
7	MF	23	(Malaysia) S. Veenod	0	0	1	0	1
TOTALS				17	1	12	6	36

† Player left the club during the season.

=== Clean sheets ===
Rnk	No.	Player	Super League	FA Cup	Malaysia Cup	AFC Cup	Total
1	1	(Malaysia) Khairulazhan	2	1	3	0	6
2	22	(Malaysia) Norazlan Razali	2	0	1	1	4
TOTALS			4	1	4	1	10

=== Disciplinary record ===
As of match played 30 October 2016

Rank	No.	Pos.	Name	Super League			FA Cup			Malaysia Cup			AFC Cup			Total		
Rank	No.	Pos.	Name	Yellow card	(yellow card) (yellow-red card)	Red card	Yellow card	(yellow card) (yellow-red card)	Red card	Yellow card	(yellow card) (yellow-red card)	Red card	Yellow card	(yellow card) (yellow-red card)	Red card	Yellow card	(yellow card) (yellow-red card)	Red card
1	8	MF	(Malaysia) Saiful Ridzuwan	4	-	-	-	-	-	4	-	-	2	-	-	10	-	-
2	21	MF	(Malaysia) Hafiz Kamal	6	-	-	-	-	-	-	-	-	2	-	1	8	-	1
3	11	FW	(Malaysia) Hazwan Bakri	3	-	-	-	-	-	2	-	-	1	-	-	6	-	-
3	15	DF	(Malaysia) Raimi Mohd Nor	3	-	-	-	-	-	1	-	-	2	-	-	6	-	-
5	20	DF	(Malaysia) Azrif Nasrulhaq †	2	-	-	1	-	-	1	-	-	1	-	-	5	-	-
6	4	FW	(Liberia) Patrick Wleh	2	-	-	-	-	-	1	-	-	1	-	-	4	-	-
6	13	DF	(Malaysia) Razman Roslan	3	-	-	1	-	-	-	-	-	-	-	-	4	-	-
8	10	MF	(Malaysia) Nazmi Faiz	2	-	1	-	-	-	1	-	-	-	-	-	3	-	1
8	16	FW	(Argentina) Mauro Olivi	1	-	-	-	-	-	-	-	-	2	-	-	3	-	-
10	3	DF	(Malaysia) Azmi Muslim	-	-	-	1	-	-	1	-	-	-	-	-	2	-	-
10	12	DF	(Malaysia) Bunyamin Umar	-	-	-	-	-	-	1	1	-	1	-	-	2	1	-
10	18	DF	(Nigeria) Ugo Ukah	-	1	1	-	-	-	2	-	-	-	-	-	2	1	1
10	23	MF	(Malaysia) S. Veenod	2	-	-	-	-	-	-	-	-	-	-	-	2	-	-
14	2	DF	(Australia) Robert Cornthwaite †	1	-	-	-	-	-	-	-	-	-	-	-	1	-	-
14	9	MF	(Malaysia) Adam Nor Azlin	1	-	-	-	-	-	-	-	-	-	-	-	1	-	-
14	22	GK	(Malaysia) Norazlan Razali	1	-	-	-	-	-	-	-	-	-	-	-	1	-	-
Total				31	1	2	3	0	0	14	1	0	12	0	1	60	2	3

† Player left the club during the season.
