= 2016 Kelantan FA season =

Kelantan
2016 season
- President: Annuar Musa
- Head coach: K. Devan (until 12 May 2016); Velizar Popov (started 13 May 2016)
- Stadium: Sultan Muhammad IV Stadium
- Malaysia Super League: 4th
- Malaysia FA Cup: Third round
- Malaysia Cup: Quarter-finals
- Top goalscorer: League: Baže Ilijoski (14); All: Baže Ilijoski (16)
- Highest home attendance: 17,653 vs Selangor (21 May 2016)
- Lowest home attendance: 2,048 vs Kedah (24 August 2016)
- Average home league attendance: 8,134
Home colours	Away colours	Third colours

The 2016 season was Kelantan's 8th season in the Malaysia Super League since being promoted and 21st successive season in the top flight of Malaysian football league system. They were also eligible to compete in Malaysia FA Cup starting from the second round and Malaysia Cup after placed in 6th place at the end of 2016 Malaysia Super League first leg.

== Sponsors ==
Supplier: DSV / Sponsors : Vida Beauty, Chengal Jati, Sinar Harian, Azham Zamiri, Konsortium Mutiara, Puspamara, Delima Perdana, UniKL, redONE, HORC

Home	Home alt.	Away	Away alt.	Goalkeeper

== Pre-season ==
The pre-season matches were held between 30 December 2015 to 6 February 2016. During those matches several foreign players made their trials with the team. They were Yakubu Aziz, André Luís Leite, Prince Nnake, Marko Perović, Fabiyi, Valci Teixeira Júnior and Dramane Traoré.

30 December 2015 Friendly	Kelantan	2–0	PKNP	Kota Bharu, Kelantan
20:45 UTC+08:00	Yakubu 8'; Zack 19'	Report		Stadium: Sultan Muhammad IV Stadium

8 January 2016 Friendly	Kelantan	2–1	AirAsia Allstars	Kota Bharu, Kelantan
20:45 UTC+08:00	André 13'; Fakhrul 86'	Report	Fairuz 55'	Stadium: Sultan Muhammad IV Stadium

13 January 2016 Friendly	Kelantan	7–0	UiTM	Kota Bharu, Kelantan
20:45 UTC+08:00	Nnake 12', 16', 56'; Perović 21'; Zaharulnizam 80'; Zack 87'; Izuan 90'	Report		Stadium: Sultan Muhammad IV Stadium

19 January 2016 Friendly	Kelantan	3–1	Yala United	Kota Bharu, Kelantan
20:45 UTC+08:00	McKain 3'; Fabiyi 26'; Júnior 86'	Report	Abdul Safee 90'	Stadium: Sultan Muhammad IV Stadium

2 February 2016 Friendly	Kelantan	0–2	Kuala Lumpur	Kota Bharu, Kelantan
21:00 UTC+08:00		Report	Konté 16'; Moreira 47'	Stadium: Sultan Muhammad IV Stadium

6 February 2016 Friendly	Kelantan	1–1	T-Team	Kota Bharu, Kelantan
21:00 UTC+08:00	Traoré 81'	Report	Bušić 63'	Stadium: Sultan Muhammad IV Stadium

== During season ==
Match were held during mid-season break and matches were held between 25 March and 4 July 2016. Several foreign players made a trial with the team for second window transfer.

25 March 2016 Friendly	Kuantan	0–0	Kelantan	Kuantan, Pahang
20:45 UTC+08:00		Report		Stadium: Darul Makmur Stadium

28 May 2016 Friendly	Kelantan	5–1	Kelantan U-21	Kota Bharu, Kelantan
21:00 UTC+08:00	Ogunlaye; Emmanuel (o.g.); Ilijoski; Manaf	Report	Danial	Stadium: Sultan Muhammad IV Stadium

25 June 2016 Friendly	Kelantan	2–1	MOF	Kota Bharu, Kelantan
22:00 UTC+08:00	Manaf 30'; Syafiq 40'	Report	Helmi 44'	Stadium: Sultan Muhammad IV Stadium

29 June 2016 Friendly	Kelantan	1–1	Perlis	Kota Bharu, Kelantan
22:00 UTC+08:00	Zaharulnizam 55'	Report	Skvka 34' (pen.)	Stadium: Sultan Muhammad IV Stadium

4 July 2016 Friendly	Kelantan	6–1	Kelantan U-21	Kota Bharu, Kelantan
22:00 UTC+08:00	Luiz 3' (pen.); Zaharulnizam 11'; Syafiq 32'; Manaf 57'; Ilijoski 59', 67'	Report	Azli 27'	Stadium: Sultan Muhammad IV Stadium

== Competitions ==
=== Overall ===
Competition	Started round	Current position / round	Final position / round	First match	Last match
Super League	—	4th	4th	13 February 2016	22 October 2016
FA Cup	Second round	Third round	Third round	20 February 2016	4 March 2016
Malaysia Cup	Group stage	Quarter-finals	Quarter-finals	12 July 2016	18 September 2016

Updated to match played 22 October 2016.
Source: Competitions

=== Malaysia Super League ===
==== League table ====
Pos	Team	Pld	W	D	L	GF	GA	GD	Pts	Qualification or relegation
2	Felda United	22	13	4	5	47	27	+20	43	Qualification to AFC Cup group stage (Note: Since the winners of 2016 Piala FA, Johor Darul Ta'zim, currently qualify for AFC Champions League based on their league position, the spot awarded to the Piala FA winner (AFC Cup group stage) would be passed to the next best team in the table (in this case, the second-placed team).)
3	Kedah	22	11	7	4	30	26	+4	37 (Note: Kedah Football Association (Kedah FA) has been found guilty of putting the suspended player during the match against Pahang on August 3, 2016. Therefore, the Football Association of Malaysia (FAM) has been awarded 3 points for Pahang and Kedah sentenced deducted 3 points for the incident.)	
4	Kelantan	22	7	8	7	37	33	+4	29	
5	Selangor	22	7	7	8	28	27	+1	28	
6	Perak	22	7	7	8	29	30	−1	28	

Source: SPMB Football Association of Malaysia, Football Malaysia LLP
Rules for classification: 1) Points; 2) Goal difference; 3) Number of goals scored; 3) Number of goals against.

==== Results by round ====
Round	1	2	3	4	5	6	7	8	9	10	11	12	13	14	15	16	17	18	19	20	21	22
Ground	A	H	H	A	H	A	H	A	H	A	A	H	A	H	A	H	H	A	H	A	A	H
Result	D	W	D	L	W	L	D	L	W	L	D	L	W	D	L	D	W	W	L	D	W	D
Position	8	4	4	7	5	6	6	7	5	6	6	8	4	5	5	7	5	5	5	6	4	4

Updated to match(es) played on 22 October 2016. Source: Competitions
A = Away; H = Home; W = Win; D = Draw; L = Loss

==== Matches ====
Win Draw Loss

The 2016 season began on 13 February and concluded on 22 October 2016.

13 February 2016 1	Perak	0–0	Kelantan	Ipoh, Perak
21:00 UTC+08:00		Report	Zaharulnizam (yellow card) 46'; McKain (yellow card) 58'	Stadium: Perak Stadium; Attendance: 21,000; Referee: Zamzaidi Katimin

16 February 2016 2	Kelantan	1–0	PDRM	Kota Bharu, Kelantan
21:00 UTC+08:00	McKain (yellow card) 49'; Traoré 65'	Report	Reuben (yellow card) 29'; Fekry (yellow card) 56'	Stadium: Sultan Muhammad IV Stadium; Attendance: 13,253; Referee: Wan Mohamad Tarmizi

26 February 2016 3	Kelantan	2–2	Sarawak	Kota Bharu, Kelantan
21:00 UTC+08:00	Ilijoski 44', 64' (yellow card) 51'; McKain (yellow card) 46'; Muslim (yellow card) 79'	Report	Makeche 8', 72'; Juninho (yellow card) 90+4'	Stadium: Sultan Muhammad IV Stadium; Attendance: 6,532; Referee: Mohd Amirul Izwan Yaacob

1 March 2016 4	Kedah	2–1	Kelantan	Alor Setar, Kedah
21:00 UTC+08:00	Kahê 69'; Syafiq 81'	Report	Indra 30' (yellow card) 61'	Stadium: Darul Aman Stadium; Attendance: 16,500; Referee: Muhd Nazmi Nasaruddin

12 March 2016 5	Kelantan	3–1	Penang	Kota Bharu, Kelantan
21:00 UTC+08:00	Ilijoski 4', 35' (yellow card) 66'; Muslim (yellow card) 11'; Badhri 71'	Report	Fitri (yellow card) 39'; Saha 81'	Stadium: Sultan Muhammad IV Stadium; Attendance: 4,315; Referee: Suhaimi Mat Hassan

5 April 2016 6	T-Team	4–2	Kelantan	Kuala Terengganu, Terengganu
21:00 UTC+08:00	Sharofetdinov 20', 72'; Cruz 38'; Konaté 48'	Report	Kamal 28' (o.g.); Ilijoski 67' (yellow card) 41'; Indra (yellow card) 42'; Zairul (yellow card) 63'	Stadium: Sultan Ismail Nasiruddin Shah Stadium; Attendance: 2,034; Referee: Saiful Mohd Rodzali

8 April 2016 7	Kelantan	2–2	Johor Darul Ta'zim	Kota Bharu, Kelantan
21:00 UTC+08:00	McKain (yellow card) 15'; Gan (yellow card) 23'; Indra 54' (yellow card) 79'; Zaharulnizam 67'; Muslim (yellow card) 74'	Report	Lucero 10', 52' (yellow card) 85'	Stadium: Sultan Muhammad IV Stadium; Attendance: 13,543; Referee: Mohd Fairuzi Mat Desa

20 April 2016 8	Pahang	4–3	Kelantan	Kuantan, Pahang
21:00 UTC+08:00	Volaš 14'; Pacheco 45+1', 90'; Faisal 47'; Potokar (yellow card) 61'	Report	Traoré 9'; Ilijoski 55' (pen.); Brendan Gan (yellow card) 61'; Izuan 78'; McKain (yellow card) 90+1'	Stadium: Darul Makmur Stadium; Attendance: 5,634; Referee: Zulkifli Ahmad

23 April 2016 9	Kelantan	3–0	Terengganu	Kota Bharu, Kelantan
21:00 UTC+08:00	Zack 13'; Indra (yellow card) 41'; Zaharulnizam 62'; Fakhrul 89'	Report		Stadium: Sultan Muhammad IV Stadium; Attendance: 3,315; Referee: S. Sitharajan

4 May 2016 10	Felda United	2–0	Kelantan	Bandar Pusat Jengka, Pahang
21:00 UTC+08:00	Turaev 42'; Doe 50'; Ridzuan (yellow card) 80'	Report	Indra (yellow card) 45'; Ilijoski (yellow card) 57'; Muslim (yellow card) 90+2'	Stadium: Tun Abdul Razak Stadium; Attendance: 10,981; Referee: Wan Mohd Tarmizi Wan Ibrahim

18 May 2016 11	Selangor	0–0	Kelantan	Selayang, Selangor
21:00 UTC+08:00		Report	Zack (red card) 26'; Gan (yellow card) 81'	Stadium: Selayang Stadium; Attendance: 9,731; Referee: Syed Azhar Syed Kamar

21 May 2016 12	Kelantan	2–5	Selangor	Kota Bharu, Kelantan
21:00 UTC+08:00	Ilijoski 10'; Traoré 60'; Zaharulnizam (red card) 61'; Qayyum (yellow card) 80'	Report	Hafiz 16' (yellow card) 25'; Gopinathan 21'; Nazmi 36'; Razman 59'; Norazlan (yellow card) 79'; Hazwan 89'	Stadium: Sultan Muhammad IV Stadium; Attendance: 17,653; Referee: Mohd Amirul Izwan Yaacob

15 July 2016 13	Terengganu	1–6	Kelantan	Kuala Terengganu, Terengganu
21:00 UTC+08:00	Bikana (red card) 4'; Nakajima-Farran 7'; Joseph (yellow card) 69'	Report	Ilijoski 3' (pen.), 63', 75', 85'; Luiz 44'; Zack (yellow card) 45+1' (goal) 58'	Stadium: Sultan Mizan Zainal Abidin Stadium; Attendance: 7,500; Referee: Mohd Zohri Tajuddin

23 July 2016 14	Kelantan	0–0	Pahang	Kota Bharu, Kelantan
21:00 UTC+08:00	Qayyum (yellow card) 59'	Report	Vranjicán (yellow card) 25'; Davies (yellow card) 36'; Saarvindran (yellow card) 87'	Stadium: Sultan Muhammad IV Stadium; Attendance: 15,562; Referee: Suhaimi Mat Hassan

26 July 2016 15	Johor Darul Ta'zim	1–0	Kelantan	Johor Bahru, Johor
21:00 UTC+08:00	Azniee (yellow card) 41'; Díaz 47'; Lucero (yellow card) 85'	Report	Nik Shahrul (yellow card) 53'; Daudsu (yellow card) 62'	Stadium: Tan Sri Dato Haji Hassan Yunos Stadium; Attendance: 16,550; Referee: Syed Azhar Syed Kamar

3 August 2016 16	Kelantan	1–1	Felda United	Kota Bharu, Kelantan
21:00 UTC+08:00	Zack (yellow card) 53'; Indra (yellow card) 58'; Luiz 79'; Norhafiz (yellow card) 85'	Report	Doe 8'; Syamim (yellow card) 49'; Jayaseelan (yellow card) 53'; Idris (yellow card) 82'	Stadium: Sultan Muhammad IV Stadium; Attendance: 3,536; Referee: Saiful Mohd Rodzali

6 August 2016 17	Kelantan	2–0	T-Team	Kota Bharu, Kelantan
21:00 UTC+08:00	Badhri 66'; Gan (yellow card) 71'; Luiz (yellow card) 88' (goal) 90'	Report	Maïga (yellow card) 22'; Azraei (yellow card) 65'	Stadium: Sultan Muhammad IV Stadium; Attendance: 7,212; Referee: Zulkifli Ahmad

16 August 2016 18	Penang	2–3	Kelantan	Penang
21:00 UTC+08:00	Córdoba 20'; Martins 45+1'; Mafry (yellow card) 57'; Lobo (yellow card) 79'	Report	Zack 7', 77'; Luiz 18'; Faris (yellow card) 90+2'	Stadium: City Stadium; Attendance: 9,019; Referee: Razlan Jeffri Ali

24 August 2016 19	Kelantan	1–2	Kedah	Kota Bharu, Kelantan
21:00 UTC+08:00	Qayyum (yellow card) 28'; Indra (yellow card) 61'; Zack 70'	Report	Halim 20'; Farhan (yellow card) 34'; Azmeer (yellow card) 43'; Baddrol 90+2'	Stadium: Sultan Muhammad IV Stadium; Attendance: 2,048; Referee: Muhd Nazmi Nasaruddin

10 September 2016 20	Sarawak	1–1	Kelantan	Kuching, Sarawak
20:15 UTC+08:00	Juninho 1'	Report	Zaharulnizam 41'	Stadium: Sarawak State Stadium; Attendance: 585; Referee: Syed Azhar Syed Kamar

23 September 2016 21	PDRM	1–2	Kelantan	Selayang, Selangor
21:00 UTC+08:00	Safuwan (yellow card) 28'; Fakhrul 40'	Report	Indra 31'; Ilijoski 78'	Stadium: Selayang Stadium; Attendance: 700; Referee: Zamzaidi Katimin

22 October 2016 22	Kelantan	2–2	Perak	Kota Bharu, Kelantan
21:00 UTC+08:00	Ilijoski 39' (pen.), 90+4'; Muslim (yellow card) 45'; Qayyum (yellow card) 48'; Zaharulnizam (red card) 74'	Report	Shahrul 53'; Fazrul 66'; Amirul (red card) 74'; Hafizul (yellow card) 90+4'	Stadium: Sultan Muhammad IV Stadium; Attendance: 2,506; Referee: Fitri Maskon

=== FA Cup ===
Win Draw Loss

20 February 2016 Round of 32	UKM	0–1	Kelantan	Kota Bharu, Kelantan
21:00 UTC+08:00		Report	Hazrul (yellow card) 53'; Ilijoski 83'	Stadium: Sultan Muhammad IV Stadium; Attendance: 7,082; Referee: Saiful Mohd Radzali

4 March 2016 Round of 16	Kedah	1–1 (a.e.t.) (5–4 p)	Kelantan	Alor Setar, Kedah
21:00 UTC+08:00	Helmi 47'; Azmeer (yellow card) 86'; Amar (yellow card) 116'	Report	McKain 34'; Indra (yellow card) 18'; McKain (yellow card) 19'; Nik Shahrul (yellow card) 86'; Zack (yellow card) 107'	Stadium: Darul Aman Stadium; Attendance: 17,500; Referee: Syed Azhar Syed Kamar
	Penalties
	Sandro (penalty scored); Kahê (penalty scored); Syafiq (penalty scored); Bang (penalty scored); Krasniqi (penalty scored)		(penalty scored) McKain; (penalty scored) Indra; (penalty scored) Zack; (penalty scored) Lucca; (penalty missed) Izuan

=== Malaysia Cup ===
The 2016 Malaysia Cup draw was made on 23 May 2016 in Kuala Lumpur. Kelantan were to face Selangor, Kuala Lumpur and Pahang. Scoring a total of 10 points, Kelantan advanced to the knockout stage as group runner-up.

==== Group stage ====
Pos	Team	Pld	W	D	L	GF	GA	GD	Pts	Qualification	SEL	KEL	PHG	KLU
1	Selangor	6	3	2	1	12	6	+6	11	Advance to knockout phase	—	3–3	3–0	1–0
2	Kelantan	6	3	1	2	7	9	−2	10	Advance to knockout phase	1–4	—	1–0	1–0
3	Pahang	6	3	0	3	5	7	−2	9		1–0	2–0	—	2–1
4	Kuala Lumpur	6	1	1	4	4	6	−2	4		1–1	0–1	2–0	—

Updated to match(es) played on 20 August 2016. Source: FAM FMLLP

Win Draw Loss

12 July 2016 1	Kelantan	1–0	Pahang	Kota Bharu, Kelantan
21:00 UTC+8	Zaharulnizam 3'	Report	Meneses (yellow card) 13'	Stadium: Sultan Muhammad IV Stadium; Attendance: 12,751; Referee: Mohd Fairuzi Mat Desa

20 July 2016 2	Selangor	3–3	Kelantan	Shah Alam, Selangor
21:00 UTC+8	Olivi 30'; Wleh 39', 49', 60'; Nazmi 56'; Ukah (yellow card) 69'	Report	Luiz 45+1'; Qayyum (yellow card) 53'; Zack 79'; Ilijoski (yellow card) 90+3'; Manaf 90+7'	Stadium: Shah Alam Stadium; Attendance: 9,895; Referee: Muhd Nazmi Nasaruddin

30 July 2016 3	Kelantan	1–0	Kuala Lumpur	Kota Bharu, Kelantan
21:00 UTC+8	Ilijoski 50' (pen.)	Report	Rasyid (yellow card) 64'	Stadium: Sultan Muhammad IV Stadium; Attendance: 14,825; Referee: Mohd Amirul Izwan Yaacob

9 August 2016 4	Kuala Lumpur	0–1	Kelantan	Selayang, Selangor
21:00 UTC+8	Carioca (yellow card) 55'	Report	Badhri 61'	Stadium: Selayang Stadium; Attendance: 6,000; Referee: Mohd Fairuzi Mat Desa

12 August 2016 5	Kelantan	1–4	Selangor	Kota Bharu, Kelantan
21:00 UTC+8	Zaharulnizam 36' (pen.)	Report	Hadi 14' (pen.); Gopinathan 24', 57'; Wleh 27'; Bunyamin (yellow card) 47' (red card)	Stadium: Sultan Muhammad IV Stadium; Attendance: 5,474; Referee: S. Sittharajanan

20 August 2016 6	Pahang	2–0	Kelantan	Kuantan, Pahang
21:00 UTC+8	Faisal 68'; Fauzi 75'	Report		Stadium: Darul Makmur Stadium; Attendance: 937; Referee: Mohd Nafeez Abdul Wahab

==== Knockout phase ====
===== Quarter-finals =====
28 August 2016 First leg	Kelantan	1–2	PDRM	Kota Bharu, Kelantan
21:00 UTC+08:00	Indra 14'; Badhri (yellow card) 45+2'; Norhafiz (yellow card) 63'; Gan (yellow card) 65'	Report	Safuwan 5'; Guilherme 22' (red card) 89'; Reuben (red card) 44'	Stadium: Sultan Muhammad IV Stadium; Attendance: 7,135; Referee: Fitri Maskon

18 September 2016 Second leg	PDRM	0–1 (*2–2 agg.)	Kelantan	Krubong, Malacca
21:00 UTC+08:00	Syahmi (yellow card) 74'; Latiff (yellow card) 83'; Andrezinho (yellow card) 88'; Fauzi Majid (yellow card) 90+4'	Report	Badhri 36'	Stadium: Hang Jebat Stadium; Attendance: 1,900; Referee: Mohd Nafeez Abdul Wahab

- * PDRM won on away goals rule

== Squad information ==
=== List of players ===
No.	Name	Nationality	Position(s)	Since	Signed from	Notes
Goalkeepers
1	Ramadhan Hamid	(Malaysia)	GK	2016	(Malaysia) Harimau Muda	
19	Khairul Fahmi Che Mat (vice-captain)	(Malaysia)	GK	2009	(Malaysia) Harimau Muda	
30	Mohd Shahrizan Ismail	(Malaysia)	GK	2008	(Malaysia) Terengganu	
40	Ahmad Syihan Hazmi	(Malaysia)	GK	2016	(Malaysia) Kelantan U21	Promoted on August
44	Hasbullah Abdul Rahim	(Malaysia)	GK	2016	(Malaysia) Kelantan U21	Promoted on August
–	Muhammad Syazwan Yusoff	(Malaysia)	GK	2011	(Malaysia) Kelantan U21	Loaned to Melaka United
Defenders
2	Norhafiz Zamani Misbah	(Malaysia)	CB	2015	(Malaysia) Negeri Sembilan	
4	Jonathan McKain	(Australia)	CB	2015	(Australia) Adelaide United	
5	Nik Shahrul Azim	(Malaysia)	RB	2012	(Malaysia) Kelantan U21	
6	Mohd Farisham Ismail	(Malaysia)	CB / RB	2008	(Malaysia) Melaka TMFC	Loaned to Penang
15	Mohd Daudsu Jamaluddin	(Malaysia)	RB / LB	2016	(Malaysia) Johor Darul Ta'zim	
17	Fakhrul Zaman	(Malaysia)	ST	2012	(Malaysia) Kelantan U21	Loaned to MOF
20	Muslim Ahmad	(Malaysia)	CB	2016	(Malaysia) PDRM	
22	Mohd Zafran Akramin Abdul Razak	(Malaysia)	CB / RB	2016	(Malaysia) Kelantan U21	
24	Zairul Fitree Ishak	(Malaysia)	LB / LM	2009	(Malaysia) Kedah	
33	Mohd Faris Shah Rosli	(Malaysia)	CB / DM	2016	(Malaysia) Kelantan U21	Promoted on second transfer window
36	Muhammad Azwan Aripin	(Malaysia)	CB	2016	(Malaysia) Kelantan U21	Promoted on August
38	Mohd Aiman Shakir Mohd Hashim	(Malaysia)	RB / RM	2016	(Malaysia) Kelantan U21	Promoted on August
–	Faizol Nazlin Sayuti	(Malaysia)	CB	2014	(Malaysia) Kelantan U21	Loaned to MOF
Midfielders
3	Mohd Rozaimi Azwar	(Malaysia)	CM / ST	2015	(Malaysia) Kelantan U21	Loaned to MOF
7	Wan Zack Haikal	(Malaysia)	LM / RM	2015	(Japan) F.C. Ryūkyū	
8	Wan Zaharulnizam Zakaria	(Malaysia)	LM / RM	2014	(Malaysia) Harimau Muda	
11	Brendan Gan	(Malaysia)	CM / DM	2014	(Australia) Rockdale City Suns	
12	Mohd Qayyum Marjoni Sabil	(Malaysia)	LW / LB	2016	(Malaysia) Kelantan U21	
13	Mohd Noor Hazrul Mohd Mustafa	(Malaysia)	LM / LB	2015	(Malaysia) Perak TBG	
16	Mohd Badhri Mohd Radzi (captain)	(Malaysia)	AM / CM	2008	(Malaysia) PDRM	
18	Amir Zikri Pauzi	(Malaysia)	LM / LW	2016	(Malaysia) Kelantan U21	
21	Morgaro Gomis	(Senegal)	DM	2016	(Scotland) Heart of Midlothian	Signed on second transfer window
23	Indra Putra Mahayuddin (vice-captain)	(Malaysia)	AM	2016	(Malaysia) Felda United	
27	Wander Luiz Bitencourt Junior	(Brazil)	AM / ST	2016	(Brazil) Tombense Futebol Clube	Signed on second transfer window
28	Jonatan Lucca	(Brazil)	DM	2016	(Brazil) Clube Atlético Paranaense	Contract terminated mid-season
29	Faizal Abu Bakar	(Malaysia)	CM	2016	(Malaysia) PDRM	
34	Mohd Syafiq Abd Rahman	(Malaysia)	RM	2016	(Malaysia) Kelantan U21	Promoted on second transfer window
39	Muhamad Fadhilah Mohd Pauzi	(Malaysia)	CM / DM	2016	(Malaysia) Kelantan U21	Promoted on August
–	Mohd Nasharizam Abd Rashid	(Malaysia)	LM	2016	(Malaysia) Kelantan U21	Promoted on second transfer window
–	Muhd Shahrul Hakim Rahim	(Malaysia)	CM	2016	(Malaysia) Kelantan U21	Promoted on August
Forwards
9	Mohd Khairul Izuan Rosli	(Malaysia)	ST / RM / LM	2011	(Malaysia) ATM	
10	Nor Farhan Muhammad	(Malaysia)	RM / LM	2015	(Malaysia) Terengganu	
14	Abdul Manaf Mamat	(Malaysia)	ST	2016	(Malaysia) Terengganu	
17	Fakhrul Zaman	(Malaysia)	ST	2016	(Malaysia) Kelantan U21	
25	Dramane Traoré	(Mali)	ST	2016	(Malaysia) PDRM	Contract terminated mid-season
26	Baže Ilijoski	(North Macedonia)	ST	2016	(North Macedonia) FK Rabotnički	
32	Muhammad Danial Asyraf Abdullah	(Malaysia)	ST / AM	2016	(Malaysia) Kelantan U21	Promoted on second transfer window
37	Nik Azli Nik Alias	(Malaysia)	ST / LM	2016	(Malaysia) Kelantan U21	Promoted on August
–	Syahrul Azwari Ibrahim	(Malaysia)	ST	2016	(Malaysia) Harimau Muda	Loaned to Sarawak

^{PC} is a Presiden Cup player who have played for the senior team as a starter, substitute or benched

=== Playing statistics ===
Key: = Appearances, = Goals, = Yellow card, (red card) = Red card
Player names in bold denotes player that left mid-season (loaned)
(number in bracket denotes the players plays as a substitute in a match)

**Number**	**Nation**	**Position**	**Name**	**Total**				**League**				**Piala FA**				**Piala Malaysia**			
**Number**	**Nation**	**Position**	**Name**		Goal	Booked	Sent off (straight red)		Goal	Booked	Sent off (straight red)		Goal	Booked	Sent off (straight red)		Goal	Booked	Sent off (straight red)
19	(Malaysia)	GK	Khairul Fahmi Che Mat	30	0	0	0	22	0	0	0	2	0	0	0	6	0	0	0
1	(Malaysia)	GK	Ramadhan Hamid	0	0	0	0	0	0	0	0	0	0	0	0	0	0	0	0
30	(Malaysia)	GK	Mohd Shahrizan Ismail	1	0	0	0	0	0	0	0	0	0	0	0	1	0	0	0
40	(Malaysia)	GK	Ahmad Syihan Hazmi	1	0	0	0	0	0	0	0	0	0	0	0	1	0	0	0
44	(Malaysia)	GK	Hasbullah Abdul Rahim	0	0	0	0	0	0	0	0	0	0	0	0	0	0	0	0
15	(Malaysia)	DF	Mohd Daudsu Jamaluddin	11(5)	0	1	0	8(4)	0	1	0	2	0	0	0	1(1)	0	0	0
4	(Australia)	DF	Jonathan McKain	12(1)	1	6	0	8(1)	0	5	0	1	1	1	0	3	0	0	0
5	(Malaysia)	DF	Nik Shahrul Azim	19	0	2	0	14	0	1	0	2	0	1	0	3	0	0	0
20	(Malaysia)	DF	Muslim Ahmad	21(1)	0	5	0	16(1)	0	5	0	2	0	0	0	3	0	0	0
2	(Malaysia)	DF	Norhafiz Zamani Misbah	15(3)	0	2	0	11(2)	0	1	0	0	0	0	0	4(1)	0	1	0
24	(Malaysia)	DF	Zairul Fitree Ishak	6(2)	0	1	0	4(1)	0	1	0	0(1)	0	0	0	2	0	0	0
22	(Malaysia)	DF	Mohd Zafran Akramin	1	0	0	0	0	0	0	0	0	0	0	0	1	0	0	0
33	(Malaysia)	DF	Mohd Faris Shah Rosli	14(1)	0	1	0	9	0	1	0	0	0	0	0	5(1)	0	0	0
36	(Malaysia)	DF	Muhammad Azwan Aripin	1	0	0	0	0	0	0	0	0	0	0	0	1	0	0	0
38	(Malaysia)	DF	Mohd Aiman Shakir	1	0	0	0	0	0	0	0	0	0	0	0	1	0	0	0
31	(Malaysia)	MF	Muhd Shahrul Hakim Rahim	1	0	0	0	0	0	0	0	0	0	0	0	1	0	0	0
39	(Malaysia)	MF	Fadhilah Mohd Pauzi	0(1)	0	0	0	0	0	0	0	0	0	0	0	0(1)	0	0	0
8	(Malaysia)	MF	Wan Zack Haikal	22(6)	6	3	1	17(3)	5	2	1	2	0	1	0	3(3)	1	0	0
23	(Malaysia)	MF	Indra Putra Mahayuddin	20(5)	4	8	0	12(5)	3	7	0	2	0	1	0	6	1	0	0
7	(Malaysia)	MF	Wan Zaharulnizam Zakaria	17(6)	5	1	2	12(3)	3	1	2	0(2)	0	0	0	5(1)	2	0	0
29	(Malaysia)	MF	Faizal Abu Bakar	1(5)	0	0	0	0(4)	0	0	0	0	0	0	0	1(1)	0	0	0
11	(Malaysia)	MF	Brendan Gan	22(1)	0	5	0	16(1)	0	4	0	1	0	0	0	5	0	1	0
16	(Malaysia)	MF	Mohd Badhri Mohd Radzi (c)	22(3)	4	1	0	18(1)	2	0	0	1	0	0	0	3(2)	2	1	0
13	(Malaysia)	MF	Mohd Noor Hazrul	7(6)	0	1	0	5(4)	0	0	0	0(1)	0	1	0	2(1)	0	0	0
12	(Malaysia)	MF	Mohd Qayyum	18	0	5	0	12	0	4	0	0	0	0	0	6	0	1	0
18	(Malaysia)	MF	Amir Zikri Pauzi	3	0	0	0	1	0	0	0	0	0	0	0	2	0	0	0
27	(Brazil)	MF	Wander Luiz Bitencourt Junior	14(2)	5	1	0	9(1)	4	1	0	0	0	0	0	5(1)	1	0	0
21	(Senegal)	MF	Morgaro Gomis	15	0	0	0	10	0	0	0	0	0	0	0	5	0	0	0
34	(Malaysia)	MF	Mohd Syafiq Abd Rahman	1(1)	0	0	0	0(1)	0	0	0	0	0	0	0	1	0	0	0
35	(Malaysia)	MF	Mohd Nasharizam Abd Rashid	1	0	0	0	0	0	0	0	0	0	0	0	1	0	0	0
14	(Malaysia)	FW	Abdul Manaf Mamat	2(7)	1	0	0	1(4)	0	0	0	0	0	0	0	1(3)	1	0	0
10	(Malaysia)	FW	Nor Farhan Muhammad	0(4)	0	0	0	0(1)	0	0	0	0	0	0	0	0(3)	0	0	0
9	(Malaysia)	FW	Mohd Khairul Izuan Rosli	5(9)	1	0	0	2(8)	1	0	0	1(1)	0	0	0	2	0	0	0
17	(Malaysia)	FW	Fakhrul Zaman	2(2)	1	0	0	1(2)	1	0	0	0	0	0	0	1	0	0	0
26	(North Macedonia)	FW	Baže Ilijoski	24(2)	16	5	0	18(1)	14	4	0	1(1)	1	0	0	5	1	1	0
32	(Malaysia)	FW	Danial Ashraf	1(1)	0	0	0	0	0	0	0	0	0	0	0	1(1)	0	0	0
37	(Malaysia)	FW	Nik Azli Nik Alias	0	0	0	0	0	0	0	0	0	0	0	0	0	0	0	0
Players who are on loan/left Kelantan mid season:
3	(Malaysia)	MF	**Mohd Rozaimi Azwar**	0	0	0	0	0	0	0	0	0	0	0	0	0	0	0	0
17	(Malaysia)	DF	**Tuan Muhammad Faim**	0	0	0	0	0	0	0	0	0	0	0	0	0	0	0	0
25	(Mali)	FW	Dramane Traoré	10(3)	3	0	0	8(3)	3	0	0	2	0	0	0	0	0	0	0
28	(Brazil)	MF	Jonatan Lucca	8(2)	0	0	0	6(2)	0	0	0	2	0	0	0	0	0	0	0
6	(Malaysia)	DF	**Mohd Farisham Ismail**	4(1)	0	0	0	3(1)	0	0	0	1	0	0	0	0	0	0	0

Statistics accurate as of 23 September 2016.

=== Goalscorers ===
Includes all competitive matches. The list is sorted alphabetically by surname when total goals are equal.

Correct as of match played on 22 October 2016

No.	Nat.	Player	Pos.	Liga Super	Piala FA	Piala Malaysia	TOTAL
25	(Mali)	Dramane Traore	FW	3	0	0	3
26	(North Macedonia)	Baže Ilijoski	FW	14	1	1	16
26	(Malaysia)	Indra Putra Mahayuddin	MF	3	0	1	4
4	(Australia)	Jonathan McKain	DF	0	1	0	1
16	(Malaysia)	Badhri Radzi	MF	2	0	2	4
8	(Malaysia)	Wan Zaharulnizam	MF	3	0	2	5
7	(Malaysia)	Wan Zack Haikal	MF	5	0	1	6
27	(Brazil)	Wander Luiz	MF	4	0	1	5
14	(Malaysia)	Abdul Manaf Mamat	FW	0	0	1	1
9	(Malaysia)	Fakhrul Zaman	FW	1	0	0	1
17	(Malaysia)	Mohd Khairul Izuan Rosli	FW	1	0	0	1
#	Own goals			1	0	0	**1**
**TOTALS**				**37**	**2**	**8**	**47**

=== Hat-tricks ===
Correct as of match played on 16 August 2016

Player	Competition	Against	Result	Date
(North Macedonia) Baze Ilijoski ^{4}	Liga Super	Terengganu FA	1–**6**	15 July 2016

Note

^{4} Player scored 4 goals
^{5} Player scored 5 goals

=== Top assists ===
Correct as of match played on 23 September 2016

Player name in bold denote the player who have left the club

Rnk	Pos	No.	Player	Liga Super	Piala FA	Piala Malaysia	Total
1	MF	7	(Malaysia) Wan Zack Haikal	7	1	1	9
2	MF	16	(Malaysia) Badhri Radzi	5	0	1	6
3	MF	27	(Brazil) Wander Luiz	3	0	1	4
4	FW	26	(North Macedonia) Baže Ilijoski	3	0	0	3
4	MF	23	(Malaysia) Indra Putra	1	0	2	3
5	FW	25	(Mali) **Dramane Traore**	1	1	0	2
5	MF	11	(Malaysia) Brendan Gan	2	0	0	2
5	MF	28	(Brazil) **Jonatan Lucca**	1	0	0	1
5	DF	5	(Malaysia) Nik Shahrul Azim	1	0	0	1
5	FW	14	(Malaysia) Manaf Mamat	1	0	0	1
5	DF	12	(Malaysia) Qayyum Marjoni Sabil	1	0	0	1
5	MF	21	(Senegal) Morgaro Gomis	0	0	1	1
5	DF	33	(Malaysia) Mohd Faris Shah Rosli	0	0	1	1
**TOTALS**				**26**	**2**	**7**	35

=== Clean sheets ===
Includes all competitive matches. The list is sorted alphabetically by surname when total clean sheets are equal.

Correct as of 22 October 2016

No.	Nat.	Player	Matches Played	Clean sheets %	Liga Super	Piala FA	Piala Malaysia
19	(Malaysia)	Khairul Fahmi Che Mat	30	37%	6	1	4
1	(Malaysia)	Mohd Shahrizan Ismail	1	0%	0	0	0
22	(Malaysia)	Ramadhan Hamid	0	0%	0	0	0
40	(Malaysia)	Ahmad Syihan Hazmi	1	0%	0	0	0
**Totals**			**32**	34%	**6**	**1**	**4**

=== Suspensions ===
Player	No. of matches served	Reason	Competition	Date served	Opponent(s)
(Malaysia) Wan Zack Haikal	1	Red card vs. Selangor	Super League	21 May 2016 (League)	Selangor
(Malaysia) Wan Zaharulnizam	6	Red card vs. Selangor	Super League	15 July 2016 (League); 23 July 2016 (League); 26 July 2016 (League); 3 August 2016 (League); 6 August 2016 (League; 16 August 2016 (League)	Terengganu; Pahang; Johor Darul Ta'zim; Felda United; T-Team; Penang

=== Summary ===
All matches played included

As of 23 October 2016

Games played	41 (22 Super League)
Games won	19 (7 Super League)
Games drawn	10 (8 Super League)
Games lost	12 (7 Super League)
Goals scored	74 (37 Super League)
Goals conceded	52 (33 Super League)
Goal difference	+22 (+4 Super League)
Clean sheets	14 (6 Super League) (11 excluding friendly matches)
Most Yellow cards	Indra Putra Mahayuddin (8)
Red cards	Wan Zaharulnizam (2)
Top scorer	Baže Ilijoski (12) (16 excluding friendly matches)
Winning Percentage	Overall:19/41 (46.34%)

=== Home attendance ===
Sultan Muhammad IV Stadium 2016 Attendance
Competition	Attendance	Away Team	Result
FA Cup Round of 32	7,082	UKM	1–0
Super League Week 2	13,253	PDRM	1–0
Super League Week 3	9,892	Sarawak	2–2
Super League Week 5	4,315	Penang	3–1
Super League Week 7	13,543	Johor Darul Ta'zim	2–2
Super League Week 9	3,315	Terengganu	3–0
Super League Week 12	17,653	Selangor	2–5
Malaysia Cup Group Stage	12,751	Pahang	1–0
Super League Week 14	15,562	Pahang	0–0
Malaysia Cup Group Stage	14,825	Kuala Lumpur	1–0
Super League Week 16	3,536	Felda United	1–1
Super League Week 17	7,212	T-Team	2–0
Malaysia Cup Group Stage	5,474	Selangor	1–4
Super League Week 19	2,048	Kedah	1–2
Malaysia Cup Quarter-finals	7,135	PDRM	1–2
Super League Week 22	2,506	Perak	2–2

source:Sistem Pengurusan Maklumat Bolasepak

== Transfers and loans ==
=== Transfers in ===
Date	Position	No.	Player	From club	Transfer fee
5 December 2015	ST	14	(Malaysia) Abdul Manaf Mamat	Terengganu FA	Free transfer
5 December 2015	MF	29	(Malaysia) Mohd Faizal Abu Bakar	(Malaysia) PDRM FA	Undisclosed Fee
5 December 2015	DF	20	(Malaysia) Muslim Ahmad	Free agent	Free transfer
5 December 2015	MF	12	(Malaysia) Mohd Qayyum	Kelantan FA U21	Promoted from youth team
5 December 2015	MF	18	(Malaysia) Muhd Amir Zikri	Kelantan FA U21	Promoted from youth team
5 December 2015	MF	-	(Malaysia) Muhd Shahrul Hakim	Kelantan FA U21	Promoted from youth team
5 December 2015	DF	22	(Malaysia) Mohd Zafran Akramin	Kelantan FA U21	Promoted from youth team
5 December 2015	FW	17	(Malaysia) Fakhrul Zaman	Kelantan FA U21	Promoted from youth team
5 December 2015	GK	1	(Malaysia) Ramdhan Hamid	(Malaysia) Harimau Muda	Free transfer
5 December 2015	MF	-	(Malaysia) Faris Shah	(Malaysia) Harimau Muda	Free transfer
10 December 2015	FW	3	(Malaysia) Rozaimi Azwar	Sabah FA	Loan Ended
10 December 2015	DF	22	(Malaysia) Faizol Nazlin Sayuti	Sabah FA	Loan Ended
28 December 2015	DF	15	(Malaysia) Mohd Daudsu Jamaluddin	Johor Darul Ta'zim F.C.	Free transfer
30 December 2015	MF	23	(Malaysia) Indra Putra Mahayuddin	(Malaysia) Felda United F.C.	Free transfer
27 January 2016	FW	25	(Mali) Dramane Traoré	(Malaysia) PDRM FA	Free transfer
27 January 2016	MF	28	(Brazil) Jonatan Lucca	(Brazil) Clube Atlético Paranaense	Undisclosed Fee
27 January 2016	FW	26	(North Macedonia) Baže Ilijoski	(North Macedonia) FK Rabotnički	Undisclosed Fee
19 February 2016	FW	-	(Malaysia) Syahrul Azwari Ibrahim	(Malaysia) Harimau Muda	Free transfer
17 June 2016	MF	27	(Brazil) Wander Luiz Bitencourt Junior	(Brazil) Tombense Futebol Clube	Free transfer
11 July 2016	MF	21	(Senegal) Morgaro Gomis	(Scotland) Heart of Midlothian F.C.	Undisclosed Fee
June 2016	DF	33	(Malaysia) Mohd Faris Shah Rosli	Kelantan FA U21	Promoted from youth team
June 2016	MF	34	(Malaysia) Mohd Syafiq	Kelantan FA U21	Promoted from youth team
June 2016	MF	31	(Malaysia) Mohd Nashrizam	Kelantan FA U21	Promoted from youth team
June 2016	FW	32	(Malaysia) Muhd Danial Asyraf	Kelantan FA U21	Promoted from youth team
August 2016	DF	36	(Malaysia) Muhd Azwan Aripin	Kelantan FA U21	Promoted from youth team
August 2016	MF	31	(Malaysia) Muhd Shahrul Hakim	Kelantan FA U21	Promoted from youth team
August 2016	GK	40	(Malaysia) Ahmad Syihan Hazmi	Kelantan FA U21	Promoted from youth team
August 2016	GK	44	(Malaysia) Hasbullah Abdul Rahim	Kelantan FA U21	Promoted from youth team
August 2016	DF	38	(Malaysia) Mohd Aiman Shakir	Kelantan FA U21	Promoted from youth team
August 2016	MF	39	(Malaysia) Muhamad Fadhilah Mohd Pauzi	Kelantan FA U21	Promoted from youth team
August 2016	FW	37	(Malaysia) Nik Azli Nik Alias	Kelantan FA U21	Promoted from youth team

=== Transfers out ===
Exit date	Position	No.	Player	To club	Transfer fee
2 December 2015	DF	42	(Malaysia) Amiridzwan Taj Tajuddin	Terengganu FA	Released
5 December 2015	FW	9	(Colombia) Erwin Carrillo	(Colombia) Real Cartagena	Released
5 December 2015	FW	47	(Nigeria) Austin Amutu	(Nigeria) Warri Wolves F.C.	Loan Ended
5 December 2015	MF	12	(Malaysia) Amar Rohidan	Kedah FA	Released
5 December 2015	FW	13	(Malaysia) Ahmad Fakri Saarani	Kedah FA	Released
5 December 2015	DF	3	(Malaysia) Mohd Fitri Omar	Penang FA	Released
5 December 2015	FW	50	(Brazil) Gilmar Jose da Silva Filho	Sarawak FA	Released
5 December 2015	DF	18	(Malaysia) Muhd Nazri Ahmad	Sabah FA	Released
1 March 2016	MF	30	(Malaysia) Faris Shah Rosli	Kelantan FA U21	Demoted
1 March 2016	MF	42	(Malaysia) Shahrul Hakim Rahim	Kelantan FA U21	Demoted
2 June 2016	FW	25	(Mali) Dramane Traore	Free Agent	Contract terminated
2 June 2016	MF	28	(Brazil) Jonatan Lucca	Free Agent	Contract terminated

=== Loans Out ===
Start date	End date	Position	No.	Player	To	Ref
9 December 2015	December 2016	GK	1	(Malaysia) Muhammad Syazwan Yusoff	(Malacca) Melaka United	
10 December 2015	December 2016	DF	22	(Malaysia) Faizol Nazlin Sayuti	(Kuala Lumpur) MOF F.C.	
19 February 2016	December 2016	FW	–	(Malaysia) Syahrul Azwari Ibrahim	Sarawak FA	
7 May 2016	December 2016	DF	17	(Malaysia) Tuan Muhamad Faim	(Kuala Lumpur) MOF F.C.	
7 May 2015	December 2016	MF	3	(Malaysia) Mohd Rozaimi Azwar	(Kuala Lumpur) MOF F.C.	
11 July 2015	December 2016	DF	6	(Malaysia) Mohd Farisham Ismail	Penang FA	
