= 2016 Pahang FC season =

Pahang
2016 season
- President: Tengku Abdul Rahman ibni Sultan Ahmad Shah
- Manager: Dato' Che Nasir Salleh
- Head Coach: Shaharuddin Rosdi (until 12 March); Razip Ismail (from 17 March)
- Stadium: Darul Makmur Stadium
- Super League: 9th
- FA Cup: Round of 16
- Malaysia Cup: Group stage
- Top goalscorer: League: Dalibor Volaš (6); All: Dalibor Volaš (7)

The 2016 season was Pahang Football Club's first season in the Malaysia Super League after rebranding their name from Pahang FA. The club's first league match was played on 13 February 2016.

== Players ==
=== First team squad ===
No.	Name	Nat.	Pos.
Goalkeeper
1	Mohd Nasril Nourdin	(Malaysia)	GK
22	Saufi Mohamad	(Malaysia)	GK
51	Helmi Eliza Elias	(Malaysia)	GK
–	Daniel Wafiuddin Sadun	(Malaysia)	GK
Defenders
2	Matthew Davies	(Malaysia)	RB,RWB
3	Saiful Nizam Miswan	(Malaysia)	CB,RB,LB
4	Ridhwan Maidin	(Malaysia)	CB,DM
5	Zesh Rehman (captain)	(Pakistan)	CB,DM
14	Faisal Mohd Rosli	(Malaysia)	LB,LWB
20	Mohd Shahrizan Salleh	(Malaysia)	LB,LWB,LM,CM
23	Nejc Potokar	(Slovenia)	CB
30	Ashar Al-Aafiz	(Malaysia)	RB,RWB,RM
Midfielders
6	D. Saarvindran	(Malaysia)	AM,CM,LM,LW
8	Salomon Raj	(Malaysia)	CM,DMC
11	Muhd Nor Azam Abdul Azih	(Malaysia)	CM
16	M. Kogileswaran Raj	(Malaysia)	AMC,ST
17	Rizua Shafiqi	(Malaysia)	RM, RW
18	Shah Amirul Mohd Zamri	(Malaysia)	RM, RW
21	Helmi Abdullah	(Malaysia)	AM,ST
24	R. Dinesh	(Malaysia)	LM,LW,LB
–	Hariz Fazrin Mohd Nazri	(Malaysia)	LM,LW
Forwards
7	Faisal Halim	(Malaysia)	ST
9	Dalibor Volaš	(Slovenia)	ST
10	German Pacheco	(Argentina)	LW,AMC, ST
13	Faizal Abdul Rani	(Malaysia)	ST
15	Amirul Kasmuri	(Malaysia)	ST
19	Mohd Fauzi Roslan	(Malaysia)	ST, LW
26	Mohd Shafie Zahari	(Malaysia)	ST

== Competitions ==
=== Super League ===
Win Draw Loss

13 February 2016 1	Pahang	2–2	T-Team	Kuantan
21:00 (UTC+9)				Stadium: Darul Makmur Stadium

16 February 2016 2	Penang	4–1	Pahang	Penang
21:00 (UTC+9)				Stadium: City Stadium

27 February 2016 3	Pahang	1–3	Selangor	Kuantan
21:00 (UTC+9)				Stadium: Darul Makmur Stadium

1 March 2016 4	Pahang	1–2	Terengganu	Kuantan
21:00 (UTC+9)				Stadium: Darul Makmur Stadium

=== FA Cup ===
Win Draw Loss

19 February 2016 Round of 32	Pahang	2–1 (a.e.t)	T-Team	Kuantan, Pahang
21:00 (UTC+9)	German Pacheco 45+1'; Dalibor Volas 112'	Report	Safawi Rashid 8'	Stadium: Darul Makmur Stadium

5 March 2016 Round of 16	Pahang	0–1	Sime Darby	Kuantan, Pahang
21:00 (UTC+8)				Stadium: Darul Makmur Stadium

=== Malaysia Cup ===
==== Group stage ====
Pos	Team	Pld	W	D	L	GF	GA	GD	Pts	Qualification	SEL	KEL	PHG	KLU
1	Selangor	6	3	2	1	12	6	+6	11	Advance to knockout phase	—	3–3	3–0	1–0
2	Kelantan	6	3	1	2	7	9	−2	10	Advance to knockout phase	1–4	—	1–0	1–0
3	Pahang	6	3	0	3	5	7	−2	9		1–0	2–0	—	2–1
4	Kuala Lumpur	6	1	1	4	4	6	−2	4		1–1	0–1	2–0	—

Updated to match(es) played on 20 August 2016. Source: FAM FMLLP

== Transfers ==
=== In ===
Pos.	Name	From
	(Slovenia) Nejc Potokar	(Croatia) NK Slaven Belupo
	(Argentina) Germán Pacheco	(Peru) Juan Aurich
	(Slovenia) Dalibor Volaš	(Slovenia) NK Maribor
	(Malaysia) M. Kogileswaran Raj	(Malaysia) Harimau Muda C
	(Malaysia) Muhd Shah Amirul Mohd Zamri	(Malaysia) Harimau Muda C
	(Malaysia) R. Dinesh	(Malaysia) Harimau Muda C
	(Malaysia) Muhammad Hariz Fazrin Mohd Nazri	(Malaysia) Shahzan Muda F.C.
	(Malaysia) Muhd Helmi Abdullah	(Malaysia) Shahzan Muda F.C.
	(Malaysia) Mohd Daniel Wafiuddin Sadun	(Malaysia) Pahang U21
	(Malaysia) Mohd Faizal Abdul Rani	(Malaysia) Pahang U21
	(Malaysia) Mohd Ridhwan Maidin	(Malaysia) Pahang U21
	(Malaysia) Muhd Amirul Kasmuri	(Malaysia) Pahang U21
	(Malaysia) Muhd Ashar Al-Aafiz Abdullah	(Malaysia) Pahang U21
	(Malaysia) Mohd Faisal Abdul Halim	(Malaysia) Penang FA U21
	(Malaysia) A. Salomon Raj	(Malaysia) Selangor FA U21

=== Out ===
Pos.	Name	To
	(Argentina) Matías Conti	(Chile) C.D. Universidad de Concepción
	(Malaysia) Mohd Azamuddin Md Akil	(Malaysia) Johor Darul Takzim F.C.
	(Malaysia) Azidan Sarudin	(Malaysia) Kuala Lumpur FA
	(Malaysia) Mohammad Abdul Aziz Ismail	(Malaysia) Melaka United
	(Malaysia) Mohd Hazri Rozali	(Malaysia) Melaka United
	(Malaysia) Muhammad Syawal Norsam	(Malaysia) Melaka United
	(Malaysia) R. Surendran	(Malaysia) Melaka United
	(Malaysia) Mohd Zaiza Zainal Abidin	(Malaysia) PKNS F.C.
	(Malaysia) Khairul Azhan Khalid	(Malaysia) Selangor FA
	(Malaysia) Mohd Hafiz Kamal	(Malaysia) Selangor FA
	(Malaysia) Mohd Razman Roslan	(Malaysia) Selangor FA
	(Malaysia) R. Gopinathan	(Malaysia) Selangor FA
	(Jamaica) Damion Stewart	Free Agent
	(Nigeria) Dickson Nwakaeme	Free Agent
	(Malaysia) Jalaluddin Jaafar	RETIRED
