= 2016 Malaysia Cup group stage =

Info for teams

The 2016 Malaysia Cup group stage featured 16 teams. The teams were drawn into fourth groups of four, and played each other home-and-away in a round-robin format. The top two teams in each group advanced to the 2016 Malaysia Cup quarter finals.

== Groups ==
The matchdays started on 12 July 2016.

=== Group A ===
| Pos | Team | Pld | W | D | L | GF | GA | GD | Pts | Qualification |
|---|---|---|---|---|---|---|---|---|---|---|
| 1 | Kedah | 6 | 4 | 1 | 1 | 12 | 6 | +6 | 13 | Advance to knockout phase |
| 2 | (Terengganu) T–Team | 6 | 3 | 1 | 2 | 8 | 5 | +3 | 10 | Advance to knockout phase |
| 3 | Johor Darul Ta'zim II | 6 | 1 | 4 | 1 | 6 | 6 | 0 | 7 | |
| 4 | Sarawak | 6 | 0 | 2 | 4 | 4 | 13 | −9 | 2 | |

Updated to match(es) played on 19 August 2016. Source: FAM FMLLP
12 July 2016
21:00 UTC+8

| T–Team (Terengganu) | 2–2 | Johor Darul Ta'zim II |
|---|---|---|
| Sharofetdinov 5'; Hakim 20' | Report | Zaquan 45+1'; Rangel 50' |

Sultan Ismail Nasiruddin Shah Stadium, Kuala Terengganu
Attendance: 3,785
Referee: Wan Mohd Tarmizi Wan Ibrahim
13 July 2016
21:00 UTC+8

| Kedah | 4–3 | Sarawak |
|---|---|---|
| Krasniqi 15' (pen.), 45+4' (pen.); Baddrol 58'; Thiago 67' | Report | Makeche 26', 49'; Shamie 30' |

Darul Aman Stadium, Alor Setar
Attendance: 17,000
Referee: Muhd Nazmi Nasaruddin

19 July 2016
21:00 UTC+8

| Johor Darul Ta'zim II | 0–0 | Sarawak |
|---|---|---|
| | Report |

Pasir Gudang Stadium, Pasir Gudang
Attendance: 2,622
Referee: Mohd Zohri Tajuddin
20 July 2016
21:00 UTC+8

| T–Team (Terengganu) | 0–2 | Kedah |
|---|---|---|
| | Report | Smeltz 8', 15' |

Sultan Ismail Nasiruddin Shah Stadium, Kuala Terengganu
Attendance: 2,334
Referee: Mohd Amirul Izwan Yaacob

29 July 2016
21:00 UTC+8

| Kedah | 0–0 | Johor Darul Ta'zim II |
|---|---|---|
| | Report |

Darul Aman Stadium, Alor Setar
Attendance: 14,000
Referee: S. Sittharanjanan
29 July 2016
21:00 UTC+8

| Sarawak | 0–2 | (Terengganu) T–Team |
|---|---|---|
| | Report | Cruz 69', 90+2' |

Sarawak State Stadium, Kuching
Attendance: 1,913
Referee: Teoh Hee Loon

9 August 2016
21:00 UTC+8

| Johor Darul Ta'zim II | 2–3 | Kedah |
|---|---|---|
| Rangel 36'; Zaquan 45+1' | Report | Smeltz 15'; Syazwan 38'; Baddrol 58' |

Pasir Gudang Stadium, Pasir Gudang
Attendance: 3,785
Referee: Mohd Zamzaidi Katimin
9 August 2016
21:00 UTC+8

| T–Team (Terengganu) | 3–0 | Sarawak |
|---|---|---|
| Konaté 15', 53'; Zulhanizam 74' | Report |

Sultan Ismail Nasiruddin Shah Stadium, Kuala Terengganu
Attendance: 1,309
Referee: Zulkifli Ahmad

13 August 2016
21:00 UTC+8

| Sarawak | 1–1 | Johor Darul Ta'zim II |
|---|---|---|
| Shamie 15' | Report | Hadi Fayyadh 42' |

Sarawak State Stadium, Kuching
Attendance: 530
Referee: Mohd Fairuzi Mat Desa
13 August 2016
21:00 UTC+8

| Kedah | 0–1 | (Terengganu) T–Team |
|---|---|---|
| | Report | Maïga 58' |

Darul Aman Stadium, Alor Setar
Attendance: 9,683
Referee: Razlan Jeffri Ali

19 August 2016
21:00 UTC+8

| Johor Darul Ta'zim II | 1–0 | (Terengganu) T–Team |
|---|---|---|
| Amer 82' | Report |

Pasir Gudang Stadium, Pasir Gudang
Attendance: 626
Referee: Fitri Maskon
19 August 2016
21:00 UTC+8

| Sarawak | 0–3 | Kedah |
|---|---|---|
| | Report | Thiago 54'; Krasniqi 71'; Seung-Hwan 89' |

Sarawak State Stadium, Kuching
Attendance: 222
Referee: Khairul Azuan Kidam

=== Group B ===
| Pos | Team | Pld | W | D | L | GF | GA | GD | Pts | Qualification |
|---|---|---|---|---|---|---|---|---|---|---|
| 1 | Selangor | 6 | 3 | 2 | 1 | 12 | 6 | +6 | 11 | Advance to knockout phase |
| 2 | Kelantan | 6 | 3 | 1 | 2 | 7 | 9 | −2 | 10 | Advance to knockout phase |
| 3 | Pahang | 6 | 3 | 0 | 3 | 5 | 7 | −2 | 9 | |
| 4 | Kuala Lumpur | 6 | 1 | 1 | 4 | 4 | 6 | −2 | 4 | |

Updated to match(es) played on 20 August 2016. Source: FAM FMLLP
12 July 2016
21:00 UTC+8

| Selangor | 1–0 | Kuala Lumpur |
|---|---|---|
| Adam 88' | Report |

Shah Alam Stadium, Shah Alam
Attendance: 3,371
Referee: Fitri Maskon
12 July 2016
21:00 UTC+8

| Kelantan | 1–0 | Pahang |
|---|---|---|
| Zaharulnizam 3' | Report |

Sultan Mohammad IV Stadium, Kota Bharu
Attendance: 12,751
Referee: Mohd Fairuzi Mat Desa

19 July 2016
21:00 UTC+8

| Kuala Lumpur | 2–0 | Pahang |
|---|---|---|
| Moreira 10'; Cantillana 54' | Report |

Selayang Stadium, Selayang
Attendance: 2,000
Referee: Mohd Nafeez Abdul Wahab
20 July 2016
21:00 UTC+8

| Selangor | 3–3 | Kelantan |
|---|---|---|
| Olivi 30'; Wleh 39', 49' | Report | Wander Luiz 45+1'; Zack 72'; Manaf 90+8' |

Shah Alam Stadium, Shah Alam
Attendance: 9,895
Referee: Muhd Nazmi Nasaruddin

30 July 2016
21:00 UTC+8

| Kelantan | 1–0 | Kuala Lumpur |
|---|---|---|
| Ilijoski 50' (pen.) | Report |

Sultan Mohammad IV Stadium, Kota Bharu
Attendance: 14,825
Referee: Mohd Amirul Izwan Yaacob
30 July 2016
21:00 UTC+8

| Pahang | 1–0 | Selangor |
|---|---|---|
| Davies 32' | Report |

Darul Makmur Stadium, Kuantan
Attendance: 3,027
Referee: Mohd Zohri Tajuddin

9 August 2016
21:00 UTC+8

| Kuala Lumpur | 0–1 | Kelantan |
|---|---|---|
| | Report | Badhri 62' |

Selayang Stadium, Selayang
Attendance: 6,000
Referee: Mohd Fairuzi Mat Desa
9 August 2016
21:00 UTC+8

| Selangor | 3–0 | Pahang |
|---|---|---|
| Wleh 37' (pen.), 66', 81' | Report |

Shah Alam Stadium, Shah Alam
Attendance: 1,887
Referee: Mohd Amirul Izwan Yaacob

12 August 2016
21:00 UTC+8

| Pahang | 2–1 | Kuala Lumpur |
|---|---|---|
| Meneses 30'; Jailton 64' | Report | Moreira 48' |

Darul Makmur Stadium, Kuantan
Attendance: 1,285
Referee: Fitri Maskon
12 August 2016
21:00 UTC+8

| Kelantan | 1–4 | Selangor |
|---|---|---|
| Zaharulnizam 36' (pen.) | Report | Hadi 22' (pen.); Gopinathan 24', 57'; Wleh 27' |

Sultan Mohammad IV Stadium, Kota Bharu
Attendance: 5,474
Referee: S. Sittharanjanan

20 August 2016
21:00 UTC+8

| Kuala Lumpur | 1–1 | Selangor |
|---|---|---|
| Fahrul 42' | Report | Hazwan 68' |

Selayang Stadium, Selayang
Attendance: 1,525
Referee: Ismail Asib Md. Amin
20 August 2016
21:00 UTC+8

| Pahang | 2–0 | Kelantan |
|---|---|---|
| Faisal 68'; Fauzi 75' | Report |

Darul Makmur Stadium, Kuantan
Attendance: 937
Referee: Mohd Nafeez Abdul Wahab

=== Group C ===
| Pos | Team | Pld | W | D | L | GF | GA | GD | Pts | Qualification |
|---|---|---|---|---|---|---|---|---|---|---|
| 1 | (Malaysia) PDRM | 6 | 3 | 1 | 2 | 8 | 9 | −1 | 10 | Advance to knockout phase |
| 2 | (Selangor) PKNS | 6 | 2 | 2 | 2 | 8 | 10 | −2 | 8 | Advance to knockout phase |
| 3 | Perak | 6 | 2 | 1 | 3 | 11 | 8 | +3 | 7 | |
| 4 | Johor Darul Ta'zim | 6 | 1 | 4 | 1 | 9 | 9 | 0 | 7 | |

Updated to match(es) played on 20 August 2016. Source: FAM FMLLP
12 July 2016
21:00 UTC+8

| Johor Darul Ta'zim | 2–2 | (Selangor) PKNS |
|---|---|---|
| Safee 47'; Lucero 56' | Report | Guerra 83'; Cobelli 90+3' (pen.) |

Larkin Stadium, Johor Bahru
Attendance: 7,430
Referee: Zulkifli Ahmad
13 July 2016
21:00 UTC+8

| Perak | 1–2 | (Malaysia) PDRM |
|---|---|---|
| Xhevahir 22' | Report | de Paula 6' (pen.); Safuwan 49' |

Perak Stadium, Ipoh
Attendance: 5,300
Referee: Syed Azhar Syed Kamar

19 July 2016
21:00 UTC+8

| Perak | 4–1 | (Selangor) PKNS |
|---|---|---|
| Elias 47', 66'; Xhevahir 50'; Fazrul 52' | Report | Soto 89' |

Perak Stadium, Ipoh
Attendance: 2,800
Referee: Mohd Zamzaidi Katimin
19 July 2016
21:00 UTC+8

| PDRM (Malaysia) | 1–1 | Johor Darul Ta'zim |
|---|---|---|
| Safuwan 90+2' | Report | Reuben 71' (o.g.) |

Hang Jebat Stadium, Malacca City
Attendance: 3,800
Referee: Teoh Hee Loon

30 July 2016
21:00 UTC+8

| PKNS (Selangor) | 1–2 | (Malaysia) PDRM |
|---|---|---|
| Jadue 8' | Report | de Paula 25', 66' |

Shah Alam Stadium, Shah Alam
Attendance: 117
Referee: Muhd Nazmi Nasaruddin
30 July 2016
21:00 UTC+8

| Perak | 3–0 | Johor Darul Ta'zim |
|---|---|---|
| Xhevahir 12'; Fazrul 42', 66' | Report |

Perak Stadium, Ipoh
Attendance: 23,000
Referee: Mohd Zamzaidi Katimin

10 August 2016
21:00 UTC+8

| PDRM (Malaysia) | 0–1 | (Selangor) PKNS |
|---|---|---|
| | Report | Shahurain 28' |

Hang Jebat Stadium, Malacca City
Attendance: 250
Referee: Syed Azhar Syed Kamar
10 August 2016
21:00 UTC+8

| Johor Darul Ta'zim | 1–1 | Perak |
|---|---|---|
| Safiq 15' (pen.) | Report | Kilichev 3' |

Larkin Stadium, Johor Bahru
Attendance: 20,675
Referee: Suhaimi Mat Hassan

13 August 2016
21:00 UTC+8

| PKNS (Selangor) | 2–1 | Perak |
|---|---|---|
| Cobelli 52'; Jadue 82' | Report | Shahrul 27' |

Shah Alam Stadium, Shah Alam
Attendance: 4,658
Referee: Teoh Hee Loon
13 August 2016
21:00 UTC+8

| Johor Darul Ta'zim | 4–1 | (Malaysia) PDRM |
|---|---|---|
| Amri 24', 30'; Nazrin 52', 60' | Report | de Paula 45+2' |

Larkin Stadium, Johor Bahru
Attendance: 10,220
Referee: Zulkifli Ahmad

20 August 2016
21:00 UTC+8

| PKNS (Selangor) | 1–1 | Johor Darul Ta'zim |
|---|---|---|
| Jadue 2' | Report | Safee 41' |

Shah Alam Stadium, Shah Alam
Attendance: 3,236
Referee: Saiful Mohd Rodzali
20 August 2016
21:00 UTC+8

| PDRM (Malaysia) | 2–1 | Perak |
|---|---|---|
| de Paula 22'; Fakhrul 58' | Report | Elias 65' |

Hang Jebat Stadium, Malacca City
Attendance: 550
Referee: Syed Azhar Syed Kamar

=== Group D ===
| Pos | Team | Pld | W | D | L | GF | GA | GD | Pts | Qualification |
|---|---|---|---|---|---|---|---|---|---|---|
| 1 | (Kuala Lumpur) FELDA United | 6 | 4 | 0 | 2 | 9 | 5 | +4 | 12 | Advance to Quarter-finals |
| 2 | Negeri Sembilan | 6 | 4 | 0 | 2 | 9 | 8 | +1 | 12 | Advance to Quarter-finals |
| 3 | Malacca United | 6 | 3 | 0 | 3 | 9 | 7 | +2 | 9 | |
| 4 | Terengganu | 6 | 1 | 0 | 5 | 3 | 10 | −7 | 3 | |

Updated to match(es) played on 19 August 2016. Source: FAM FMLLP
12 July 2016
21:00 UTC+8

| FELDA United (Kuala Lumpur) | 3–1 | Negeri Sembilan |
|---|---|---|
| Jayaseelan 27'; Forkey Doe 54', 70' | Report | Annas 64' |

Tun Abdul Razak Stadium, Jengka
Attendance: 1,638
Referee: S. Sittharanjanan
12 July 2016
21:00 UTC+8

| Malacca United | 2–1 | Terengganu |
|---|---|---|
| Spasojević 54' (pen.); Surendran 58' | Report | Milić 74' |

Hang Jebat Stadium, Malacca City
Attendance: 9,000
Referee: Mohd Nafeez Abdul Wahab

19 July 2016
21:00 UTC+8

| Negeri Sembilan | 3–2 | Malacca United |
|---|---|---|
| Smith 27', 38'; Henrique 40' | Report | Pinto 14'; Ferris 60' |

Tuanku Abdul Rahman Stadium, Seremban
Attendance: 6,177
Referee: Syed Azhar Syed Kamar
20 July 2016
21:00 UTC+8

| FELDA United (Kuala Lumpur) | 0–1 | Terengganu |
|---|---|---|
| | Report | Norshahrul 49' |

Tun Abdul Razak Stadium, Jengka
Attendance: 1,493
Referee: Razlan Jeffri Ali

29 July 2016
21:00 UTC+8

| Malacca United | 0–1 | (Kuala Lumpur) FELDA United |
|---|---|---|
| | Report | Shukor 88' |

Hang Jebat Stadium, Malacca City
Attendance: 13,000
Referee: Mohd Nafeez Abdul Wahab
30 July 2016
21:00 UTC+8

| Terengganu | 1–2 | Negeri Sembilan |
|---|---|---|
| Milić 23' | Report | Jerković 71' (pen.); Afiq 78' |

Sultan Mizan Zainal Abidin Stadium, Kuala Nerus
Attendance: 2,200
Referee: Zulkifli Ahmad

9 August 2016
21:00 UTC+8

| Negeri Sembilan | 1–0 | Terengganu |
|---|---|---|
| Jerković 18' | Report |

Tuanku Abdul Rahman Stadium, Seremban
Attendance: 2,717
Referee: Mohd Nafeez Abdul Wahab
9 August 2016
21:00 UTC+8

| FELDA United (Kuala Lumpur) | 2–1 | Malacca United |
|---|---|---|
| Forkey Doe 10', 18' | Report | Nurshamil 12' |

Tun Abdul Razak Stadium, Jengka
Attendance: 2,402
Referee: Wan Mohd Tarmizi Wan Ibrahim

12 August 2016
21:00 UTC+8

| Malacca United | 2–0 | Negeri Sembilan |
|---|---|---|
| Spasojević 9', 32' | Report |

Hang Jebat Stadium, Malacca City
Attendance: 9,010
Referee: Saiful Mohd Yusoff Mahadi
12 August 2016
21:00 UTC+8

| Terengganu | 0–3 | (Kuala Lumpur) FELDA United |
|---|---|---|
| | Report | Norfazly 20'; Forkey Doe 45'; Zah Rahan 78' |

Sultan Mizan Zainal Abidin Stadium, Kuala Nerus
Attendance: 1,751
Referee: Suresh Jayaraman

19 August 2016
21:00 UTC+8

| Negeri Sembilan | 2–0 | (Kuala Lumpur) FELDA United |
|---|---|---|
| Jerković 55'; Nizam 59' | Report |

Tuanku Abdul Rahman Stadium, Seremban
Attendance: 2,006
Referee: Muhd Nazmi Nasaruddin
19 August 2016
21:00 UTC+8

| Terengganu | 0–2 | Malacca United |
|---|---|---|
| | Report | Saiful 61'; Ezrie 78' |

Sultan Mizan Zainal Abidin Stadium, Kuala Nerus
Attendance: 350
Referee: Zulkifli Ahmad
