= 2016 Malaysia Cup knockout stage =

The 2016 Malaysia Cup knockout phase began on 27 August 2016 and concluded on 30 October 2016 with the final at Shah Alam Stadium in Selangor, Malaysia to decide the champions of the 2016 Malaysia Cup. A total of 8 teams competed in the knockout phase.

== Round and draw dates ==
The draw for the 2016 Malaysia Cup was held on at the Sri Pentas, Persiaran Bandar Utama, Petaling Jaya with the participating team coaches and captains in attendance.

Round	Draw date and time	First leg	Second leg
Quarter-finals	23 May 2016, 22:30 UTC+8	28 August 2016	17 September 2016
Semi-finals	23 May 2016, 22:30 UTC+8	30 September–1 October 2016	15 October 2016
Final	23 May 2016, 22:30 UTC+8	30 October 2016 at Shah Alam Stadium, Shah Alam, Selangor	

== Format ==
The knockout phase involved the eight teams which qualified as winners and runners-up of each of the eight groups in the group stage.

Each tie in the knockout phase, apart from the final, was played over two legs, with each team playing one leg at home. The team that scored more goals on aggregate over the two legs advanced to the next round. If the aggregate score was level, the away goals rule was applied, i.e. the team that scored more goals away from home over the two legs advanced. If away goals were also equal, then thirty minutes of extra time was played. The away goals rule was again applied after extra time, i.e. if there were goals scored during extra time and the aggregate score was still level, the visiting team advanced by virtue of more away goals scored. If no goals were scored during extra time, the tie was decided by penalty shoot-out. In the final, which was played as a single match, if scores were level at the end of normal time, extra time was played, followed by penalty shoot-out if scores remained tied.

The mechanism of the draws for each round was as follows:

- In the draw for the quarter-final, the four group winners were seeded, and the four group runners-up were unseeded. The seeded teams were drawn against the unseeded teams, with the seeded teams hosting the second leg. Teams from the same group or the same association could not be drawn against each other.
- In the draws for the quarter-finals onwards, there were no seedings, and teams from the same group or the same association could be drawn against each other.

== Qualified teams ==
Group	Winners (Seeded in quarter final draw)	Runners-up (Unseeded in quarter final draw)
A	Kedah	(Terengganu) T–Team
B	Selangor	Kelantan
C	(Malaysia) PDRM	(Selangor) PKNS
D	(Kuala Lumpur) Felda United	Negeri Sembilan

=== Bracket ===
The bracket was decided after the draw.

Quarter-finals
D2	Negeri Sembilan	0	0	0
A1	Kedah	0	5	5
B2	Kelantan	1	1	2
C1	(Malaysia) PDRM (a)	2	0	2
B1	Selangor	4	1	5
C2	(Selangor) PKNS	3	0	3
D1	(Terengganu) T–Team	1	1	2
A2	(Kuala Lumpur) Felda United	1	0	1

Semi-finals
Kedah	2	0	2
(Malaysia) PDRM	1	0	1
Selangor	2	3	5
(Terengganu) T–Team	1	0	1

Final
Kedah (p)	1 (6)
Selangor	1 (5)

== Quarter-finals ==
The first legs were played on 28 August 2016, and the second legs were played on 17 September 2016.

Team 1	Agg.	Team 2	1st leg	2nd leg
Negeri Sembilan	0–5	Kedah	0–0	0–5
Kelantan	2–2 (a)	(Malaysia) PDRM	1–2	1–0
T–Team (Terengganu)	2–1	(Kuala Lumpur) Felda United	1–1	1–0
PKNS (Selangor)	3–5	Selangor	3–4	0–1

First Leg

28 August 2016
21:00 UTC+8

Negeri Sembilan	0–0	Kedah
	Report

Tuanku Abdul Rahman Stadium, Paroi, Seremban
Attendance: 7,346
Referee: Saiful Mohd Rodzali

Second Leg

17 September 2016
21:00 UTC+8

Kedah	5–0	Negeri Sembilan
Smeltz 24', 33'; Thiago 39', 50'; Krasniqi 87'	Report

Darulaman Stadium, Alor Setar
Attendance: 25,000
Referee: Mohd Zamzaidi Katimin

Kedah won 5–0 on aggregate.

First Leg

28 August 2016
21:00 UTC+8

T–Team (Terengganu)	1–1	(Kuala Lumpur) FELDA United
Safawi 3'	Report	Forkey Doe 51'

Sultan Ismail Nasiruddin Shah Stadium, Kuala Terengganu
Attendance: 4,859
Referee: Khairul Azuan Kidam

Second Leg

17 September 2016
21:00 UTC+8

FELDA United (Kuala Lumpur)	0–1	(Terengganu) T–Team
	Report	Sharofetdinov 78'

Tun Abdul Razak Stadium, Jengka
Attendance: 7,555
Referee: Mohd Amirul Izwan Yaacob

T–Team won 2–1 on aggregate.

First Leg

28 August 2016
21:00 UTC+8

Kelantan	1–2	(Malaysia) PDRM
Indra 14'	Report	Safuwan 5' de Paula 22'

Sultan Muhammad IV Stadium, Kota Bharu
Attendance: 7,135
Referee: Fitri Maskon

Second Leg

17 September 2016
21:00 UTC+8

PDRM (Malaysia)	0–1	Kelantan
	Report	Badhri 35'

Hang Jebat Stadium, Krubong
Attendance: 1,900
Referee: Mohd Nafeez Abdul Wahab

2–2 on aggregate. PDRM won on away goals.

First Leg

28 August 2016
21:00 UTC+8

PKNS (Selangor)	3–4	Selangor
Cobelli 28'; Soto 60'; Guerra 74'	Report	Ukah 5'; Hazwan 24'; Gopinathan 52'; Olivi 85'

Shah Alam Stadium, Shah Alam
Attendance: 2,712
Referee: Muhd Nazmi Nasaruddin

Second Leg

17 September 2016
21:00 UTC+8

Selangor	1–0	(Selangor) PKNS
Nazmi 55'	Report

Shah Alam Stadium, Shah Alam
Attendance: 3,227
Referee: Mohd Fairuzi Mat Desa

Selangor won 5–3 on aggregate.

== Semi-finals ==
The first legs were played on 30 September & 1 October 2016, and the second legs were played on 15 October 2016.

Team 1	Agg.	Team 2	1st leg	2nd leg
Kedah	2–1	(Malaysia) PDRM	2–1	0–0
Selangor	5–1	(Terengganu) T–Team	2–1	3–0

First Leg

30 September 2016
21:00 UTC+8

Kedah	2–1	(Malaysia) PDRM
Thiago 8' (pen.); Krasniqi 80' (pen.)	Report	de Paula 11' (pen.)

Darulaman Stadium, Alor Setar
Attendance: 25,000
Referee: Zulkifli Ahmad

Second Leg

15 October 2016
21:00 UTC+8

PDRM (Malaysia)	0–0	Kedah
	Report

Hang Jebat Stadium, Krubong
Attendance: 7,000
Referee: Muhd Nazmi Nasaruddin

Kedah won 2–1 on aggregate.

First Leg

1 October 2016
21:00 UTC+8

Selangor	2–1	(Terengganu) T–Team
Hazwan 45+3'; Ukah 80'	Report	Cruz 22' (pen.)

Shah Alam Stadium, Shah Alam
Attendance: 15,168
Referee: Syed Azhar Syed Kamar

Second Leg

15 October 2016
21:00 UTC+8

T–Team (Terengganu)	0–3	Selangor
	Report	Gopinathan 2'; Ukah 19'; Andik 90+2'

Sultan Ismail Nasiruddin Shah Stadium, Kuala Terengganu
Attendance: 12,500
Referee: Mohd Zamzaidi Katimin

Selangor won 5–1 on aggregate.

== Final ==
The final was played on 30 October 2016 at the Shah Alam Stadium in Shah Alam, Selangor.

30 October 2016
21:00 UTC+8

Kedah	1–1	Selangor
Rizal 52'	Report	Hazwan 60'
Penalties
Smeltz (penalty missed); Seung-Hwan (penalty scored); Farhan (penalty scored); Krasniqi (penalty scored); Baddrol (penalty scored); Amirul (penalty missed); Halim (penalty scored); Rizal Ghazali (penalty scored)	6–5	(penalty scored) Ukah; (penalty scored) Wleh; (penalty missed) Azmi; (penalty scored) Olivi; (penalty scored) Veenod; (penalty missed) Hafiz; (penalty scored) Andik; (penalty missed) Rizal Fahmi

Shah Alam Stadium, Shah Alam, Selangor
Attendance: 79,782
Referee: Mohd Amirul Izwan Yaacob
