= Nejc Potokar =

Slovenian footballer (born 1988)

Personal information
- Date of birth: 2 December 1988 (age 37)
- Place of birth: Zagorje ob Savi, SFR Yugoslavia
- Height: 1.89 m (6 ft 2 in)
- Position: Centre-back

Youth career
- 1995–2004: Zagorje
- 2004–2007: Celje

Senior career*
Years	Team	Apps	(Gls)
2007	Celje	0	(0)
2007–2008	Zagorje	32	(0)
2009	Bonifika	3	(1)
2009–2011	Triglav Kranj	44	(1)
2011–2014	Maribor	57	(0)
2014	AEL Limassol	8	(0)
2015	Inter Zaprešić	3	(0)
2015–2016	Slaven Belupo	7	(0)
2016	Pahang FC	11	(0)
2017	Milsami Orhei	5	(0)
2020-2021	Zreče	7	(0)
2021-2023	Dravinja	16	(1)

International career
- Slovenia U15
- Slovenia U17
2006	Slovenia U18	2	(0)
2006-2014	Slovenia U19	2	(0)
- Slovenia U20
- * Club domestic league appearances and goals

Nejc Potokar (born 2 December 1988) is a Slovenian former professional footballer who played as a centre-back.
