= 2016 Malaysia Cup =

2016 TM Malaysia Cup
TM Piala Malaysia 2016

Tournament details
- Country: Malaysia
- Teams: 16

Final positions
- Champions: Kedah (5th title)
- Runners-up: Selangor

Tournament statistics
- Matches played: 61
- Goals scored: 155 (2.54 per match)
- Top goal scorer(s): (7 goals); Guilherme de Paula

Awards
- Best player: Rizal Ghazali (Kedah FA)

The 2016 Malaysia Cup (Malay: Piala Malaysia 2016) was the 90th edition of Malaysia Cup tournament organised by Football Association of Malaysia.

The 2016 Malaysia Cup began on July with a preliminary round. A total of 16 teams took part in the competition. The teams were divided into four groups, each containing four teams. The group leaders and runners-up teams in the groups after six matches qualified to the quarterfinals. Selangor were the defending champions.

The 2016 Malaysia Cup Final was played between Selangor and Kedah at the Shah Alam Stadium in Shah Alam, Selangor. It was the second time in the tournament's history that both finalists, after the same team faced each other in the last season's final, which Kedah been defeated by Selangor 2–0.

== Format ==
In the competition, the top 11 teams from the First Round of 2016 Malaysia Super League were joined by the top 5 teams from the First Round of 2016 Malaysia Premier League. The teams were drawn into four groups of four teams.

== Round and draw dates ==
The draw for the 2016 Malaysia Cup was held on 23 May 2016 at Sri Pentas, Persiaran Bandar Utama, Petaling Jaya on live telecast Scoreboard Extra Time with the participating team coaches and captains in attendance.

Phase	Round	Draw date	First leg	Second leg
Group stage	Matchday 1	23 May 2016, 22:30 UTC+8	12–13 July 2016	
Group stage	Matchday 2	23 May 2016, 22:30 UTC+8	19–20 July 2016	
Group stage	Matchday 3	23 May 2016, 22:30 UTC+8	29–30 July 2016	
Group stage	Matchday 4	23 May 2016, 22:30 UTC+8	9–10 August 2016	
Group stage	Matchday 5	23 May 2016, 22:30 UTC+8	12–13 August 2016	
Group stage	Matchday 6	23 May 2016, 22:30 UTC+8	19–20 August 2016	
Knockout stage	Quarter-finals	23 May 2016, 22:30 UTC+8	28 August 2016	17 September 2016
Knockout stage	Semi-finals	23 May 2016, 22:30 UTC+8	30 September–1 October 2016	15 October 2016
Knockout stage	Final	23 May 2016, 22:30 UTC+8	30 October 2016 at Shah Alam Stadium, Shah Alam, Selangor	

== Seeding ==
Pot 1	Pot 2	Pot 3	Pot 4
(Kuala Lumpur) Felda United; Johor Darul Ta'zim; Selangor (Terengganu) T–Team	Kedah; Kelantan (Malaysia) PDRM; Terengganu	Perak; Sarawak; Pahang; Malacca United	Kuala Lumpur; Negeri Sembilan; Johor Darul Ta'zim II (Selangor) PKNS

== Group stage ==
=== Group A ===
Pos	Team	Pld	W	D	L	GF	GA	GD	Pts	Qualification	KED	TTE	JDT	SRW
1	Kedah	6	4	1	1	12	6	+6	13	Advance to knockout phase	—	0–1	0–0	4–3
2	(Terengganu) T–Team	6	3	1	2	8	5	+3	10	Advance to knockout phase	0–2	—	2–2	3–0
3	Johor Darul Ta'zim II	6	1	4	1	6	6	0	7		2–3	1–0	—	0–0
4	Sarawak	6	0	2	4	4	13	−9	2		0–3	0–2	1–1	—

Updated to match(es) played on 19 August 2016. Source: FAM FMLLP

=== Group B ===
Pos	Team	Pld	W	D	L	GF	GA	GD	Pts	Qualification	SEL	KEL	PHG	KLU
1	Selangor	6	3	2	1	12	6	+6	11	Advance to knockout phase	—	3–3	3–0	1–0
2	Kelantan	6	3	1	2	7	9	−2	10	Advance to knockout phase	1–4	—	1–0	1–0
3	Pahang	6	3	0	3	5	7	−2	9		1–0	2–0	—	2–1
4	Kuala Lumpur	6	1	1	4	4	6	−2	4		1–1	0–1	2–0	—

Updated to match(es) played on 20 August 2016. Source: FAM FMLLP

=== Group C ===
Pos	Team	Pld	W	D	L	GF	GA	GD	Pts	Qualification	POL	PKN	PRK	JDT
1	(Malaysia) PDRM	6	3	1	2	8	9	−1	10	Advance to knockout phase	—	0–1	2–1	1–1
2	(Selangor) PKNS	6	2	2	2	8	10	−2	8	Advance to knockout phase	1–2	—	2–1	1–1
3	Perak	6	2	1	3	11	8	+3	7		1–2	4–1	—	3–0
4	Johor Darul Ta'zim	6	1	4	1	9	9	0	7		4–1	2–2	1–1	—

Updated to match(es) played on 20 August 2016. Source: FAM FMLLP

=== Group D ===
Pos	Team	Pld	W	D	L	GF	GA	GD	Pts	Qualification	FEL	NSE	MEL	TRG
1	(Kuala Lumpur) FELDA United	6	4	0	2	9	5	+4	12	Advance to Quarter-finals	—	3–1	2–1	0–1
2	Negeri Sembilan	6	4	0	2	9	8	+1	12	Advance to Quarter-finals	2–0	—	3–2	1–0
3	Malacca United	6	3	0	3	9	7	+2	9		0–1	2–0	—	2–1
4	Terengganu	6	1	0	5	3	10	−7	3		0–3	1–2	0–2	—

Updated to match(es) played on 19 August 2016. Source: FAM FMLLP

== Knockout stage ==
In the knockout stage, teams played against each other over two legs on a home-and-away basis, except for the one-match final. The mechanism of the draws for each round was as follows:

- In the draw for the quarter final, the fourth group winners were seeded, and the fourth group runners-up were unseeded. The seeded teams were drawn against the unseeded teams, with the seeded teams hosting the second leg. Teams from the same group or the same association could not be drawn against each other.
- In the draws for the quarter-finals onwards, there were no seedings, and teams from the same group or the same association could be drawn against each other.

=== Bracket ===
The bracket was decided after the draw.

Quarter-finals
D2	Negeri Sembilan	0	0	0
A1	Kedah	0	5	5
B2	Kelantan	1	1	2
C1	(Malaysia) PDRM (a)	2	0	2
B1	Selangor	4	1	5
C2	(Selangor) PKNS	3	0	3
D1	(Terengganu) T–Team	1	1	2
A2	(Kuala Lumpur) Felda United	1	0	1

Semi-finals
Kedah	2	0	2
(Malaysia) PDRM	1	0	1
Selangor	2	3	5
(Terengganu) T–Team	1	0	1

Final
Kedah (p)	1 (6)
Selangor	1 (5)

=== Quarter-finals ===
The first legs were played on 28 August 2016, and the second legs were played on 17 September 2016.

Team 1	Agg.	Team 2	1st leg	2nd leg
Negeri Sembilan	0–5	Kedah	0–0	0–5
Kelantan	2–2 (a)	(Malaysia) PDRM	1–2	1–0
T–Team (Terengganu)	2–1	(Kuala Lumpur) Felda United	1–1	1–0
PKNS (Selangor)	3–5	Selangor	3–4	0–1

=== Semi-finals ===
The first legs were played on 30 September & 1 October 2016, and the second legs were played on 15 October 2016.

Team 1	Agg.	Team 2	1st leg	2nd leg
Kedah	2–1	(Malaysia) PDRM	2–1	0–0
Selangor	5–1	(Terengganu) T–Team	2–1	3–0

=== Final ===
The final were played on 30 October 2016 at the Shah Alam Stadium in Shah Alam, Selangor.

30 October 2016
21:00 UTC+8

Kedah	1–1	Selangor
Rizal 52'	Report	Hazwan 60'
Penalties
Smeltz (penalty missed); Seung-Hwan (penalty scored); Farhan (penalty scored); Krasniqi (penalty scored); Baddrol (penalty scored); Amirul (penalty missed); Halim (penalty scored); Rizal Ghazali (penalty scored)	6–5	(penalty scored) Ukah; (penalty scored) Wleh; (penalty missed) Azmi; (penalty scored) Olivi; (penalty scored) Veenod; (penalty missed) Hafiz; (penalty scored) Andik; (penalty missed) Rizal Fahmi

Shah Alam Stadium, Shah Alam, Selangor
Attendance: 79,782
Referee: Mohd Amirul Izwan Yaacob

== Statistics ==
=== Top scorers ===
Statistics exclude play-off round.

Rank	Player	Club	Goals
1	(Brazil) Guilherme de Paula Lucrécio	PDRM	7
2	(Liberia) Francis Forkey Doe	Felda United	6
2	(Liberia) Patrick Wleh	Selangor	6
3	(Brazil) Thiago Augusto Fernandes	Kedah	5
3	(Kosovo) Liridon Krasniqi	Kedah	5
3	(New Zealand) Shane Smeltz	Kedah	5
4	(Malaysia) Ahmad Hazwan Bakri	Selangor	4
4	(Malaysia) R. Gopinathan	Selangor	4

=== Own goals ===
Rank	Player	For	Club	Date	Own goal
1	(Malaysia) K. Reuben	Johor Darul Ta'zim	PDRM	19/7/2016	1

=== Hat-tricks ===
Player	Club	Against	Result	Date
(Liberia) Patrick Wleh	Selangor	Pahang	3 – 0	9 August 2016

== Winners ==
2016 Malaysia Cup winner

5th title
