= Gonzalo Soto =

Argentine footballer

Personal information
- Full name: Gonzalo Manuel Soto
- Date of birth: 3 April 1990 (age 36)
- Place of birth: La Plata, Argentina
- Height: 1.90 m (6 ft 3 in)
- Position: Centre back

Team information
- Current team: Gimnasia y Tiro

Youth career
- Gimnasia

Senior career*
Years	Team	Apps	(Gls)
2012–2013	Gimnasia	7	(0)
2013–2014	Villa San Carlos	15	(0)
2014–2015	Universitario	3	(0)
2016–2017	PKNS	20	(2)
2018	Técnico Universitario	12	(0)
2018–2019	Chacarita Juniors	11	(0)
2019	Bellinzona	10	(2)
2022	Sarawak United FC	20	(2)
2023–2024	Mitre	23	(1)
2024–2025	Aldosivi	37	(0)
2025	Nueva Chicago	13	(0)
2025–2026	Colón	12	(0)
2026–	Gimnasia y Tiro	9	(0)
- * Club domestic league appearances and goals as of 18:03, 28 April 2026 (UTC)

Gonzalo Manuel Soto (born 3 April 1990) is an Argentine footballer who plays as a centre-back for Gimnasia y Tiro.

== Career ==
=== AC Bellinzona ===
In September 2019, Soto joined AC Bellinzona in the Swiss Promotion League.
