= Juan Manuel Cobelli =

Argentine footballer

Personal information
- Full name: Juan Manuel Cobelli
- Date of birth: February 27, 1988 (age 38)
- Place of birth: Funes, Argentina
- Height: 1.88 m (6 ft 2 in)
- Position: Forward

Team information
- Current team: ASD Marina di Ragusa

Youth career
- Newell's Old Boys

Senior career*
| Years | Team | Apps | (Gls) |
| 2007–2011 | Newell's Old Boys | 6 | (3) |
| 2008 | → S. Wanderers (loan) | 0 | (0) |
| 2010 | → Iquique (loan) | 20 | (4) |
| 2011–2012 | Chacarita Juniors | 20 | (3) |
| 2012–2013 | Atletico Tucuman | 14 | (1) |
| 2013–2015 | Sud América | 12 | (4) |
| 2014–2015 | → Dep. Cuenca (loan) | 39 | (16) |
| 2015–2016 | UCV | 13 | (2) |
| 2016 | PKNS | 18 | (12) |
| 2017 | Taranto | 7 | (0) |
| 2018 | Técnico Universitario | 12 | (0) |
| 2018 | Gimnasia y Tiro | 9 | (2) |
| 2019– | ASD Marina di Ragusa | 11 | (0) |
- * Club domestic league appearances and goals

Juan Manuel Cobelli (born February 27, 1988, in Funes) is an Argentine professional footballer who currently plays for Italian Serie D club ASD Marina di Ragusa.

== Career ==
In April 2017, Cobelli joined Italian club Taranto F.C. 1927. After spells with Técnico Universitario and Gimnasia y Tiro, he returned to Italy in August 2019 to sign with ASD Marina di Ragusa.

== Honours ==
=== Club ===
Deportes Iquique

- Copa Chile: 2010
- Primera B: 2010
