= Mohd Fairuzi Mat Desa =

Malaysian football referee

- Full name: Mohd Fairuzi bin Mat Desa
- Born: Malaysia

Domestic
Years	League	Role
2015–	Malaysia Premier League	Referee
2016–	Malaysia Super League	Referee

Mohd Fairuzi Mat Desa is a Malaysia professional football referee.

== Career ==
In 2015, Fairuzi started his career as a professional referee.

He made his officiate debut in Premier League matches, between Kedah and KL SPA Putrajaya on 6 February 2016, with results end with a 5–1 win for Kedah.
