= Amirul Izwan Yaacob =

Malaysian football referee (born 1986)

Mohd Amirul Izwan Yaacob
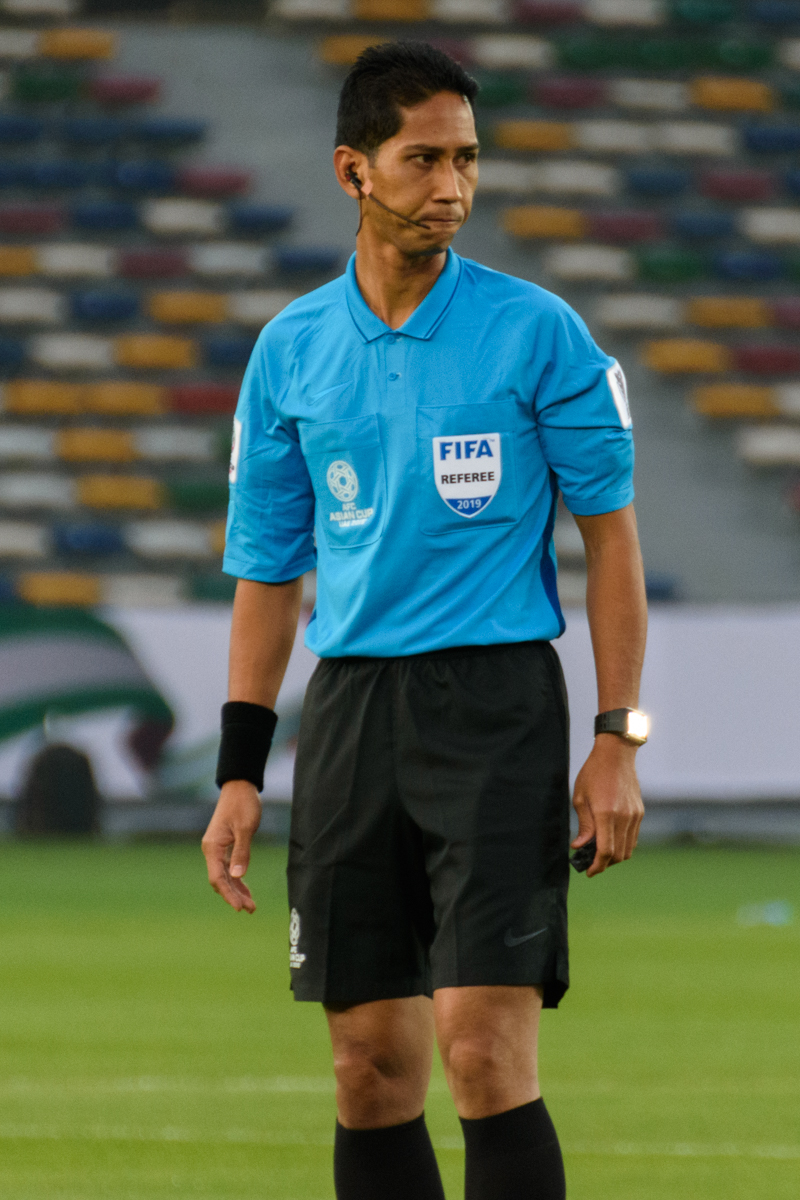
- Full name: Mohd Amirul Izwan bin Yaacob
- Born: 25 April 1986 (age 40); Kedah, Malaysia

Domestic
Years	League	Role
2011–	Malaysia Premier League	Referee
2013–	Malaysia Super League	Referee

International
Years	League	Role
2012–	FIFA listed	Referee

Mohd Amirul Izwan Yaacob (born 25 April 1986) is a Malaysian football referee. He has been a full international for FIFA since 2012.

== Career ==
Amirul Izwan Yaacob started the professional refereeing in 2011 and was awarded his FIFA badge in 2012.

He refereed some matches in AFC Champions League and AFC Cup.

In 2015, he was selected for the U-17 World Cup in Chile.

In the end of season 2019, he was invited to be referee 2 matches in 2019 V.League 1 in the two last rounds.

== AFC Asian Cup ==
2019 AFC Asian Cup – United Arab Emirates
Date	Match	Venue	Round
13 January 2019	Oman – Japan	Abu Dhabi	Group stage
