= 2014 Johor Darul Ta'zim F.C. season =

Johor Darul Ta'zim
2014 season
- President: Tunku Ismail Idris
- Manager: Wan Nizam Wan Omar
- Head Coach: César Ferrando (Until 25 February); Bojan Hodak (From 25 February)
- Stadium: Larkin Stadium
- Super League: 1st
- FA Cup: Semi-finals
- Malaysia Cup: Runners-up
- Top goalscorer: League: Luciano Figueroa (11); All: Luciano Figueroa (22)
- Highest home attendance: 30,000 (29 March 2014 vs Sarawak)
- Lowest home attendance: 15,000 (10 June 2014 vs Sime Darby)
- Average home league attendance: 23,000
- Biggest win: 5–0 vs Penang (H), 26 August 2014, Malaysia Cup
- Biggest defeat: 3–4 vs Felda United (H), 20 October 2014, Malaysia Cup
Home colours	Away colours	Third colours

The 2014 season is Johor Darul Ta'zim Football Club's 42nd season in club history and 2th season in the Malaysia Super League after rebranding their name from Johor FC.

The season was marked by the club winning the Malaysia Super League title, ending their 13-year run without a major trophy. They ended up winning the title by a 12-point margin over runners-up Selangor.

== Season overview ==

Johor Darul Ta'zim's 2014 starting lineup

The 2014 season was a breakthrough one for Johor Darul Ta'zim, as the club won its first-ever Malaysia Super League title in its 42-year history and reached the Malaysia Cup final, narrowly missing out on a domestic double.

=== Super League ===
JDT began their Malaysia Super League campaign with a 2–0 win over Perak, with Amri Yahyah opening the scoring. Under head coach Bojan Hodak, who took over mid-season after César Ferrando's departure, the team transformed from a mid-table side into genuine title contenders. JDT secured the league title on 25 June 2014 with a 1–0 away win over Sarawak at the Sarawak Stadium, clinching the club's first-ever top-flight championship. They finished top of the table with 44 points from 22 matches, recording 13 wins, 5 draws, and 4 defeats, with a goal difference of +17, finishing ahead of second-placed Selangor.

=== FA Cup ===
In the 2014 Malaysia FA Cup, Johor Darul Ta'zim (JDT) received a bye into the second round as finalists from the previous season's competition. They were drawn against the winner of the T-Team versus UiTM FC tie, which T-Team won 3–2. JDT progressed by defeating T-Team 3–0 in the second round, although the result was awarded after T-Team walked off at half-time while trailing 2–1. In the quarter-finals, JDT beat Kedah FA 3–1 at Tan Sri Dato' Hj Hassan Yunos Stadium on 11 February, with goals from Mohd Amri Yahyah, Hariss Harun, and Luciano Figueroa; they completed the tie with a 2–0 away win in Alor Setar. Their run ended in the semi-finals against Pahang FA. After a 1–1 first-leg draw in Johor Bahru, Pahang won the return leg 1–0 to progress 2–1 on aggregate. Pahang then defeated Felda United 2–1 in the final at Shah Alam Stadium on 7 June 2014.

=== Malaysia Cup ===
The Malaysia Cup was where JDT came closest to adding a second trophy to their league triumph. After topping their group, which included a 1–0 win over Kelantan and a 5–0 thrashing of Pulau Pinang, JDT advanced to the knockout stages. They defeated ATM FA 3–1 on aggregate in the quarter-finals, then edged past Felda United in the semi-finals to reach the final. In the final against Pahang on 1 November at Bukit Jalil National Stadium, the match ended 2–2 after extra time, but JDT lost 5–3 on penalties, denying the club a historic league-and-cup double. Despite the cup heartbreak, the 2014 season is widely regarded as the turning point that launched JDT's era of dominance in Malaysian football, as the league title was the club's first major trophy under the new Johor Darul Ta'zim name.

== Squads ==
=== First Team Squad ===
No.	Name	Nationality	Position(s)	Since	Date of birth (age)	Signed from
Goalkeepers
1	Norazlan Razali	(Malaysia)	GK	2014	19 December 1985 (aged 29)	(Malaysia) Selangor
22	Al-Hafiz Hamzah	(Malaysia)	GK	2013	15 March 1984 (aged 30)	(Malaysia) USM FC
25	Izham Tarmizi	(Malaysia)	GK	2013	24 April 1991 (aged 23)	(Malaysia) Harimau Muda
Defenders
2	Azizi Matt Rose	(Malaysia)	RB	2014	6 November 1981 (aged 33)	(Malaysia) Kelantan
3	S. Subramaniam	(Malaysia)	CB	2014	31 December 1985 (aged 29)	(Malaysia) Kelantan
4	Asraruddin Putra Omar	(Malaysia)	CB / LB	2014	25 March 1988 (aged 26)	(Malaysia) Selangor
44	Marcos Antônio	(Brazil)	CB	2014	25 May 1983 (aged 30)	(Germany) FC Nuremberg
7	Aidil Zafuan	(Malaysia)	CB	2013	3 August 1987 (aged 27)	(Malaysia) ATM
5	Baihakki Khaizan	(Singapore)	CB	2014	31 January 1984 (aged 30)	(Singapore) LionsXII
15	Daudsu Jamaluddin	(Malaysia)	RB / LB	2014	18 March 1985 (aged 29)	(Malaysia) Kelantan
18	Mahali Jasuli	(Malaysia)	RB	2014	2 April 1989 (aged 25)	(Malaysia) Selangor
26	Kamarul Afiq Kamaruddin	(Malaysia)	CB	2013	7 May 1986 (aged 28)	(Malaysia) Sime Darby FC
27	Fadhli Shas	(Malaysia)	CB / LB	2014	21 January 1991 (aged 23)	(Malaysia) Harimau Muda A
33	Fazly Mazlan	(Malaysia)	LB	2013	22 December 1993 (aged 21)	(Malaysia) Youth systems
Midfielders
8	Safiq Rahim	(Malaysia)	CM	2013	5 July 1987 (aged 27)	(Malaysia) Selangor
10	Pablo Aimar	(Argentina)	CM	2014	3 November 1979 (aged 35)	(Portugal) Benfica
12	Azwan Roya	(Malaysia)	LW / RW	2013	25 June 1986 (aged 28)	(Malaysia) Kelantan
13	Amirul Hadi Zainal	(Malaysia)	CM / AM	2014	27 May 1986 (aged 28)	(Malaysia) Pahang
14	Hariss Harun	(Singapore)	CM / DM	2014	19 November 1990 (aged 24)	(Singapore) LionsXII
16	Wan Kuzain	(Malaysia) (United States)	DM / CM	2014	14 September 1998 (aged 16)	(United States) Saint Louis
20	Nazrin Nawi	(Malaysia)	LW	2014	7 February 1988 (aged 26)	(Malaysia) Negeri Sembilan
21	Jasazrin Jamaluddin	(Malaysia)	CM	2012	3 April 1986 (aged 28)	(Malaysia) Johor FA
23	Irfan Fazail	(Malaysia)	CM	2014	12 April 1991 (aged 23)	(Malaysia) Harimau Muda A
28	Akram Mahinan	(Malaysia)	CM	2013	19 January 1993 (aged 21)	(Malaysia) Harimau Muda B
Forwards
19	Luciano Figueroa	(Argentina)	ST	2014	19 May 1981 (aged 33)	(Greece) Panathinaikos
9	Norshahrul Idlan Talaha	(Malaysia)	AM / ST	2013	8 June 1986 (aged 28)	(Malaysia) Kelantan
11	Safee Sali	(Malaysia)	AM / ST	2013	28 January 1984 (aged 30)	(Indonesia) Arema Malang
42	Jorge Pereyra Díaz	(Argentina)	ST	2014	5 August 1990 (aged 24)	(Argentina) Club Atlético Lanús

== Transfer ==
=== In ===
Date	Pos.	Name	From	Fee
1 November 2013	DF	(Malaysia) Azizi Matt Rose	(Malaysia) Kelantan FA	RM 4.3bilion
1 November 2013	DF	(Malaysia) Daudsu Jamaluddin	(Malaysia) Kelantan FA	Undisclosed Fee
1 November 2013	DF	(Malaysia) S. Subramaniam	(Malaysia) Kelantan FA	Free
1 November 2013	DF	(Malaysia) Mohd Asraruddin Putra Omar	(Malaysia) Selangor FA	Undisclosed Fee
1 November 2013	DF	(Singapore) Baihakki Khaizan	(Singapore) LionsXII	Undisclosed Fee
1 November 2013	MF	(Argentina) Pablo Aimar	(Portugal) Benfica	Undisclosed Fee
1 November 2013	MF	(Singapore) Hariss Harun	(Singapore) LionsXII	Undisclosed Fee
1 November 2013	MF	(Malaysia) Mohd Shakir Shaari	(Malaysia) Kelantan FA	Undisclosed Fee
1 November 2013	FW	(Malaysia) Mohd Amri Yahyah	(Malaysia) Selangor FA	Undisclosed Fee
1 November 2013	FW	(Argentina) Luciano Figueroa	(Greece) Panathinaikos F.C.	RM 3.2 million
1 November 2013	MF	(Malaysia) Mohd Irfan Fazail	(Malaysia) Harimau Muda	Undisclosed Fee
1 November 2013	GK	(Malaysia) Mohd Izham Tarmizi	(Malaysia) Harimau Muda	Undisclosed Fee
1 November 2013	DF	(Malaysia) Mohd Fadhli Mohd Shas	(Malaysia) Harimau Muda	Undisclosed Fee
1 November 2013	MF	(Malaysia) Nazrin Nawi	(Malaysia) Negeri Sembilan FA	Undisclosed Fee
19 December 2013	MF	(Malaysia) Mohd Amirul Hadi Zainal	(Malaysia) Pahang FA	Undisclosed Fee

=== Out ===
Date	Pos.	Name	To	Fee
1 November 2013	GK	(Malaysia) Zulfadhli Mohamed	(Malaysia) Johor Darul Takzim II FC	-
1 November 2013	DF	(Malaysia) Mohd Irfan Abdul Ghani	(Malaysia) T–Team F.C.	-
1 November 2013	DF	(Malaysia) Ahmad Tharmini Saiban	Free	-
1 November 2013	DF	(Malaysia) Muhamad Tuah Iskandar Jamaluddin	(Malaysia) Perak FA	-
1 November 2013	DF	(Malaysia) Mohd Muslim Ahmad	(Malaysia) PDRM FA	-
1 November 2013	GK	(Malaysia) Mohd Zamir Selamat	(Malaysia) PKNS	-
1 November 2013	DF	(Malaysia) Muhd Nazri Ahmad	(Malaysia) Kelantan FA	-
1 November 2013	MF	(Malaysia) Mohd Redzuan Nawi	(Malaysia) Sabah FA	-
1 November 2013	DF	(Malaysia) Mohd Farid Ramli	(Malaysia) Sime Darby	-
1 November 2013	MF	(Malaysia) K. Thanaraj	(Malaysia) Felda United	-
1 November 2013	MF	(Malaysia) Ahmad Ezrie Shafizie Sazali	(Malaysia) PDRM FA	-
1 November 2013	MF	(Malaysia) Mohd Musleyadi Mansor	Out Of Contract	-
1 November 2013	FW	(Argentina) Leonel Núñez	(Greece) OFI	-
1 November 2013	FW	(Malaysia) Mohd Azinee Taib	(Malaysia) Johor Darul Takzim II FC	-
1 November 2013	FW	(Malaysia) Mohd Zaquan Adha Abdul Radzak	(Malaysia) Johor Darul Takzim II FC	-

== Pre-season and friendlies ==
Date	Opponents	H / A	Result F–A	Scorers	Attendance
19 December 2013	Tampines Rovers FC	Home	7-1	Lucho 31',53', Amri 45',63', Aimar 47' Akram 83' Haziq 90'	-
29 December 2013	Hougang United	Home	3-0	Amri 5',52', Aidil 43'	-
4 January 2014	Melaka United	Home	4-1	Aimar 17', Lucho 37', Safee 83'(penalti)90+'	-
7 January 2014	Pelita Bandung Raya	Home	1-1	Safee 75'	-
11 January 2014	Home United FC	Home	2-2	Nazrin Nawi 7', Lucho 72'	-

== Competitions ==
=== Overview ===
Competition	First match	Last match	Starting round	Final position	Record							
Competition	First match	Last match	Starting round	Final position	Pld	W	D	L	GF	GA	GD	Win %
Malaysia Super League	18 January 2014	25 June 2014	Matchday 1	Winners	22	13	5	4	39	22	+17	59.09
Malaysia FA Cup	1 February 2014	30 May 2014	Second round	Semi-finals	5	3	1	1	9	3	+6	60.00
Malaysia Cup	13 August 2014	1 November 2014	Group stage	Runners-up	11	7	3	1	24	9	+15	63.64
Total					38	23	9	6	72	34	+38	60.53

Last updated: 1 November 2014
Source: Competitions

=== Malaysia Super League ===
==== Matches ====
Win Draw Lose

Saturday 18 January 1	Johor Darul Ta'zim	2 – 0	Perak	Tan Sri Dato Hj Hassan Yunos Stadium, Johor Bahru, Johor
20:45 UTC+08:00	Amri Yahyah 39'; Luciano Figueroa 88'

Saturday 25 January 2	T-Team	1 – 0	Johor Darul Ta'zim	Sultan Ismail Nasiruddin Shah Stadium, Kuala Terengganu, Terengganu
20:45 UTC+08:00	Patrich Wanggai 71'

Tuesday 28 January 3	Johor Darul Ta'zim	2 – 2	LionsXII	Tan Sri Dato Hj Hassan Yunos Stadium, Johor Bahru, Johor
20:45 UTC+08:00	Luciano Figueroa 27'; Pablo Aimar 41'		Khairul Amri 68'; Hafiz Abu Sujad 71'	Referee: Mohd Amirul Izuan

Friday 7 February 4	Pahang	3 – 2	Johor Darul Ta'zim	Darul Makmur Stadium, Kuantan, Pahang
20:45 UTC+08:00	Matías Conti 13'; Mohd Fauzi Roslan 47'; Mohd Hafiz Kamal 90+2'		Pablo Aimar 45+2'; Safee Sali 72'

Saturday 15 February 5	Johor Darul Ta'zim	4 – 1	Selangor	Tan Sri Dato Hj Hassan Yunos Stadium, Johor Bahru, Johor
20:45 UTC+08:00	Baihakki Khaizan 11'; Hariss Harun 33'; Luciano Figueroa 52'; Fadhli Shas 59'		Paulo Rangel 68'pen

Saturday 8 March 6	Sime Darby	0 – 2	Johor Darul Ta'zim	Selayang Stadium, Kuala Lumpur, Malaysia
20:45 UTC+08:00			Luciano Figueroa 23'; Norshahrul Idlan Talaha 31'

Saturday 15 March 7	Terengganu	1 – 0	Johor Darul Ta'zim	Sultan Ismail Nasiruddin Shah Stadium, Kuala Terengganu, Terengganu
20:45 UTC+08:00	Vincent Bikana 16'

Saturday 22 March 8	Johor Darul Ta'zim	1 – 1	ATM	Tan Sri Dato Hj Hassan Yunos Stadium, Johor Bahru, Johor
20:45 UTC+08:00	Safee Sali 88'		Riduwan Maon 41'

Tuesday 25 March 9	Kelantan	1 – 2	Johor Darul Ta'zim	Sultan Muhammad IV Stadium, Kota Bharu, Kelantan
20:45 UTC+08:00	Mohammed Ghaddar 17'		Amri Yahyah 33'; Mohd Fazly Mazlan 87'

Saturday 29 March 10	Johor Darul Ta'zim	1 – 1	Sarawak	Tan Sri Dato Hj Hassan Yunos Stadium, Johor Bahru, Johor
20:45 UTC+08:00	Luciano Figueroa 29'		S. Chanturu 16'

Friday 04 April 11	PKNS	1 – 1	Johor Darul Ta'zim	Shah Alam Stadium, Shah Alam, Selangor
20:45 UTC+08:00	Patrick Wleh 37'		Mahali Jasuli 57'

Friday 11 April 12	Johor Darul Ta'zim	1 – 0	PKNS	Tan Sri Dato Hj Hassan Yunos Stadium, Johor Bahru, Johor
20:45 UTC+08:00	Aminuddin Noor 3' (o.g.)

Tuesday 15 April 13	Perak	0 – 1	Johor Darul Ta'zim	Perak Stadium, Ipoh, Perak
20:45 UTC+08:00			Nazrin Nawi 13'

Friday 18 April 14	Johor Darul Ta'zim	2 – 1	T-Team	Tan Sri Dato Hj Hassan Yunos Stadium, Johor Bahru, Johor
20:45 UTC+08:00	Luciano Figueroa 31', 90+4'		Leandro Dos Santos 27'

Friday 16 May 15	Johor Darul Ta'zim	2 – 2	Pahang	Tan Sri Dato Hj Hassan Yunos Stadium, Johor Bahru, Johor
20:45 UTC+08:00	Luciano Figueroa 27'; Safiq Rahim 48'		Mohd Azamuddin Md Akil 36'; R. Gopinathan 90'

Tuesday 20 May 16	LionsXII	2 – 3	Johor Darul Ta'zim	Jalan Besar Stadium, Singapore
19:45 UTC+08:00	Faris Ramli 38'; Zulfahmi Arifin 41'		Jorge Pereyra Díaz 42', 75'; Luciano Figueroa 54'

Saturday 24 May 17	Selangor	0 – 1	Johor Darul Ta'zim	Shah Alam Stadium, Selangor
20:45 UTC+08:00			Luciano Figueroa 71'

Tuesday 10 June 18	Johor Darul Ta'zim	3 – 0	Sime Darby	Tan Sri Dato Hj Hassan Yunos Stadium, Johor Bahru, Johor
20:45 UTC+08:00	Mohd Amri Yahyah 44'; Jorge Pereyra Díaz 51', 80'

Friday 13 June 19	Johor Darul Ta'zim	4 – 3	Terengganu	Tan Sri Dato Hj Hassan Yunos Stadium, Johor Bahru, Johor
20:45 UTC+08:00	Jorge Pereyra Díaz 20', 36', 52' (pen); Mahali Jasuli 45'		Moustapha Dabo 3'; Nor Farhan Muhammad 17'; Vincent Bikana 84'

Tuesday 17 June 20	ATM	2 – 1	Johor Darul Ta'zim	Selayang Stadium, Gombak, Selangor
20:45 UTC+08:00	Bruno Martelotto 39'; Affize Faisal Mamat 59'		Asraruddin Putra Omar 84'

Friday 20 June 21	Johor Darul Ta'zim	3 – 0	Kelantan	Tan Sri Dato Hj Hassan Yunos Stadium, Johor Bahru, Johor
20:45 UTC+08:00	Amirul Hadi Zainal 26'; Nazrin Nawi 53'; Luciano Figueroa 88'

Wednesday 25 June 22	Sarawak	0 – 1	Johor Darul Ta'zim	Sarawak State Stadium, Kuching, Sarawak
20:45 UTC+08:00			Jorge Pereyra Díaz 66'

==== League table ====
Pos	Team	Pld	W	D	L	GF	GA	GD	Pts	Qualification or relegation
1	Johor Darul Ta'zim	22	13	5	4	39	22	+17	44	2015 AFC Champions League qualifying play-off
2	Selangor	22	12	5	5	28	19	+9	41	
3	Pahang	22	11	4	7	36	30	+6	37	2015 AFC Cup group stage (Note: Qualified as 2014 Piala FA winners)
4	Terengganu	22	10	6	6	38	28	+10	36	
5	Sime Darby	22	9	4	9	32	32	0	31	

Source: RSSSF, FAM Official Site, Astro Arena
Rules for classification: 1) points; 2) goal difference; 3) number of goals scored

=== Malaysia FA Cup ===
Win Draw Lose

==== Knockout stage ====
Saturday 1 February Second Round	Johor Darul Ta'zim	3 – 0	T-Team	Tan Sri Dato Haji Hassan Yunos Stadium, Johor Bahru, Johor
20:45 UTC+08:00	Luciano Figueroa 15', 20'	T-Team w/o	Mohd Marzuki Yusof 29'

==== Quarter-finals ====
Tuesday 11 February 1st Leg	Johor Darul Ta'zim	3 – 1	Kedah	Tan Sri Dato Haji Hassan Yunos Stadium, Johor Bahru, Johor
20:45 UTC+08:00	Mohd Amri Yahyah 15'; Hariss Harun 21'; Luciano Figueroa 90+2'		Billy Mehmet 24'

Tuesday 18 February 2nd Leg	Kedah	0 – 2 (1 – 5 agg.)	Johor Darul Ta'zim	Darul Aman Stadium, Alor Setar, Kedah
20:45 UTC+08:00			Norshahrul Idlan Talaha 62'; Safee Sali 85'

==== Semifinals ====
Monday 5 May 1st Leg	Johor Darul Ta'zim	1 – 1	Pahang	Tan Sri Dato Haji Hassan Yunos Stadium, Johor Bahru, Johor
	Luciano Figueroa 13'		Matías Conti 36'

Friday 30 May 2nd Leg	Pahang	1 – 0 (2 – 1 agg.)	Johor Darul Ta'zim	Darul Makmur Stadium, Kuantan, Pahang
	Mohd Faizol Hussien 81'

=== Malaysia Cup ===
==== Group stages ====
Team	Pld	W	D	L	GF	GA	GD	Pts	(Johor) JDT	(Kelantan) KEL	ATM	(Penang) PEN
Johor DT (A)	6	5	1	0	13	1	+12	16		1–0	0–0	5–0
Kelantan (A)	6	3	0	3	10	8	+2	9	0–3		1–2	3–1
ATM	6	1	2	3	4	8	−4	5	0–1	0–3		1–1
Penang	6	1	1	4	6	16	−10	4	1–3	1–3	2–1	

Legend: Blue = home team win; Yellow = draw; Red = away team win.
(A) Advanced to the 2014 Piala Malaysia quarter finals

Win Draw Lose

Wednesday 13 August 1	Johor Darul Ta'zim	1 – 0	Kelantan	Tan Sri Dato Haji Hassan Yunos Stadium, Johor Bahru, Johor
20:45 UTC+08:00	Safiq Rahim 72'

Tuesday 19 August 2	Johor Darul Ta'zim	0 – 0	ATM	Tan Sri Dato Haji Hassan Yunos Stadium, Johor Bahru, Johor
20:45 UTC+08:00

Saturday 23 August 3	Penang	1 – 3	Johor Darul Ta'zim	City Stadium, Georgetown, Penang
20:45 UTC+08:00	Lee Kil-Hoon 63'		Amri Yahyah 12'; Safiq Rahim 13'; Jorge Pereyra Díaz 64'

Tuesday 26 August 4	Johor Darul Ta'zim	5 – 0	Penang	Tan Sri Dato Haji Hassan Yunos Stadium, Johor Bahru, Johor
20:45 UTC+08:00	Jorge Pereyra Díaz 2'; Luciano Figueroa 29' (pen), 54'; Amri Yahyah 38'; Hariss Harun 83'

Friday 29 August 5	ATM	0 – 1	Johor Darul Ta'zim	Selayang Stadium, Gombak, Selangor
20:45 UTC+08:00			Luciano Figueroa 18'

Tuesday 2 September 6	Kelantan	0 – 3	Johor Darul Ta'zim	Sultan Muhammad IV Stadium, Kota Bharu, Kelantan
20:45 UTC+08:00			Jorge Pereyra Díaz 28'; Jasazrin Jamaluddin 48'; Luciano Figueroa 67'

==== Quarter-finals ====
Friday 3 October 1st Leg	Terengganu	0 – 0	Johor Darul Ta'zim	Sultan Ismail Nasiruddin Shah Stadium, Kuala Terengganu, Terengganu
20:45 UTC+08:00

Thursday 16 October 2nd Leg	Johor Darul Ta'zim	3 – 1 (3 – 1 agg.)	Terengganu	Tan Sri Dato Haji Hassan Yunos Stadium, Johor Bahru, Johor
20:45 UTC+08:00	Safiq Rahim 16', 75'; Luciano Figueroa 22'		Ashaari Shamsuddin 60'

==== Semifinals ====
Monday 20 October 1st Leg	Felda United	4 – 3	Johor Darul Ta'zim	Selayang Stadium, Gombak, Selangor
20:45 UTC+08:00	Edward Junior Wilson 7'; Ahmad Syamim Yahya 43'; Ndumba Makeche 61' 90+3'		Jorge Pereyra Díaz 52' 89'; Luciano Figueroa 79'

Saturday 25 October 2nd Leg	Johor Darul Ta'zim	3 – 1 (6 – 5 agg.)	Felda United	Tan Sri Dato Haji Hassan Yunos Stadium, Johor Bahru, Johor
20:45 UTC+08:00	Luciano Figueroa 29', 64'; Amri Yahyah 72'		Mohd Raimi Mohd Nor 36'

==== Final ====
Saturday 1 November Final	Johor Darul Ta'zim	2 – 2 (3 – 5 p)	Pahang	National Stadium, Bukit Jalil, Kuala Lumpur
20:45 UTC+08:00	Jorge Pereyra Díaz 31'; Luciano Figueroa 34' pen		Dickson Nwakaeme 15', 71'
	Penalties
	Luciano Figueroa (penalty scored); Jorge Pereyra Díaz (penalty scored); Hariss Harun (penalty scored); Norshahrul Idlan Talaha (penalty missed)		(penalty scored) Mohd Razman Roslan; (penalty scored) Damion Stewart; (penalty scored) Mohd Shahrizan Salleh; (penalty scored) Zesh Rehman; (penalty scored) Mohd Hafiz Kamal

== Goalscorers ==
Includes all competitive matches. The list is sorted by shirt number when total goals are equal.

As of match played 1 November 2014

Rank	Pos.	No.	Player	Super League	FA Cup	Malaysia Cup	Total
1	FW	19	(Argentina) Luciano Figueroa	11	2	9	22
2	FW	42	(Argentina) Jorge Pereyra Díaz	8	0	6	14
3	FW	17	(Malaysia) Mohd Amri Yahyah	3	1	3	7
4	MF	8	(Malaysia) Safiq Rahim	1	0	4	5
5	FW	11	(Malaysia) Safee Sali	2	1	0	3
6	MF	14	(Singapore) Hariss Harun	1	1	1	3
7	DF	18	(Malaysia) Mahali Jasuli	2	0	0	2
8	MF	20	(Malaysia) Nazrin Nawi	2	0	0	2
9	MF	10	(Argentina) Pablo Aimar	2	0	0	2
10	FW	9	(Malaysia) Norshahrul Idlan Talaha	1	1	0	2
11	DF	5	(Singapore) Baihakki Khaizan	1	0	0	1
12	DF	27	(Malaysia) Mohd Fadhli Mohd Shas	1	0	0	1
13	DF	33	(Malaysia) Mohd Fazly Mazlan	1	0	0	1
14	DF	4	(Malaysia) Asraruddin Putra Omar	1	0	0	1
15	MF	13	(Malaysia) Mohd Amirul Hadi Zainal	1	0	0	1
16	MF	21	(Malaysia) Jasazrin Jamaluddin	0	0	1	1
Own Goals				1	0	0	1
TOTALS				39	6	24	69

== Top assists ==
Includes all competitive matches. The list is sorted by shirt number when total assists are equal.

As of match played 1 November 2014

Rank	Pos.	No.	Player	Super League	FA Cup	Malaysia Cup	Total
1	FW	17	(Malaysia) Mohd Amri Yahyah	3	1	5	9
2	FW	19	(Argentina) Luciano Figueroa	7	0	1	8
3	DF	18	(Malaysia) Mahali Jasuli	4	3	0	7
4	FW	42	(Argentina) Jorge Pereyra Díaz	3	0	4	7
5	MF	8	(Malaysia) Safiq Rahim	4	1	1	6
6	FW	9	(Malaysia) Norshahrul Idlan Talaha	3	0	2	5
7	MF	20	(Malaysia) Nazrin Nawi	1	0	2	3
8	MF	13	(Malaysia) Mohd Amirul Hadi Zainal	2	0	0	2
9	MF	10	(Argentina) Pablo Aimar	2	0	0	2
10	DF	5	(Singapore) Baihakki Khaizan	1	0	0	1
11	MF	12	(Malaysia) Nurul Azwan Roya	1	0	0	1
12	DF	4	(Malaysia) Asraruddin Putra Omar	1	0	0	1
13	MF	21	(Malaysia) Jasazrin Jamaluddin	0	0	1	1
14	MF	33	(Malaysia) Mohd Fazly Mazlan	0	0	1	1
