= 2014 Malaysia Cup final =

- Event: 2014 Malaysia Cup
Johor Darul Takzim	Pahang
(Johor)	(Pahang)
2	2
- Pahang won 5–3 on penalties
- Date: 1 November 2014
- Venue: Bukit Jalil National Stadium, Kuala Lumpur
- Man of the Match: Safiq Rahim (Johor Darul Takzim)
- Referee: Nagor Amir Mohamad Nor
- Attendance: 90,000
- Weather: Clear; 25 °C (77 °F)

The 2014 Malaysia Cup final was a football match which was played on 1 November 2014, to determine the winners of the 2014 Malaysia Cup. It was the final of the 88th edition of the Malaysia Cup, competition organised by the Football Association of Malaysia.

The final was played between Johor Darul Takzim and Pahang.

== Venue ==
The final was held at the Bukit Jalil National Stadium in Kuala Lumpur.

== Match details ==
1 November 2014
20:45 MST

Johor Darul Ta'zim	2–2 (a.e.t.)	Pahang FA
Jorge Pereyra Díaz 31'; Luciano Figueroa 34' (pen.)		Dickson Nwakaeme 15', 71'
Penalties
Figueroa (penalty scored); Pereyra (penalty scored); Hariss (penalty scored); Nor Shahrul (penalty missed)	3–5	(penalty scored) Razman; (penalty scored) Stewart; (penalty scored) Shahrizan; (penalty scored) Rehman; (penalty scored) Hafiz

Bukit Jalil National Stadium, Bukit Jalil, Kuala Lumpur
Attendance: 90,000
Referee: Nagor Amir Noor Mohd

Johor Darul Ta'zim	Pahang FA

GK	22	(Malaysia) Al-Hafiz Hamzah
RB	18	(Malaysia) Mahali Jasuli		(substituted off) 50'
CB	44	(Brazil) Marcos António Elias Santos
CB	27	(Malaysia) Fadhli Shas
LB	4	(Malaysia) Asraruddin Putra Omar
RM	21	(Malaysia) Jasazrin Jamaluddin
CM	8	(Malaysia) Mohd Safiq Rahim (c)
CM	16	(Malaysia) Mohd Shakir Shaari	(yellow card) 78'	(substituted off) 80'
LM	17	(Malaysia) Mohd Amri Yahyah
CF	19	(Argentina) Luciano Figueroa
CF	42	(Argentina) Jorge Pereyra Díaz
Substitutions:
DF	14	(Singapore) Hariss Harun		(substituted on) 50'
FW	9	(Malaysia) Nor Shahrul Idlan		(substituted on) 80'
Manager:
(Croatia) Bojan Hodak

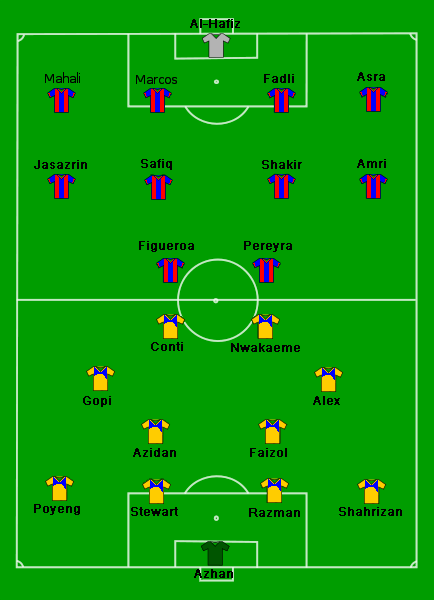

GK	1	(Malaysia) Khairul Azhan Khalid
RB	3	(Malaysia) Saiful Nizam Miswan		(red card) 70'
CB	4	(Jamaica) Damion Stewart
CB	13	(Malaysia) Mohd Razman Roslan (c)
LB	20	(Malaysia) Mohd Shahrizan Salleh
RM	12	(Malaysia) Azamuddin Akil
CM	11	(Malaysia) Mohd Faizol Hussien		(substituted off) 50'
CM	8	(Malaysia) Azidan Sarudin	(yellow card) 42'
LM	24	(Malaysia) Gopinathan Ramachandra
CF	9	(Argentina) Matías Conti		(substituted off) 88'
CF	10	(Nigeria) Dickson Nwakaeme
Substitutes:
MF	21	(Malaysia) Mohd Hafiz Kamal	(yellow card) 41'	(substituted on) 50'
DF	6	(Pakistan) Zesh Rehman		(substituted on) 88'
Manager:
(Malaysia) Zainal Abidin Hassan

Officials

- Linesmen:
- Fourth official:

Match Rules

- 90 minutes.
- 30 minutes of extra time if necessary.
- Penalty shoot-out if scores still level.
- Seven named substitutes.
- Maximum of three substitutions.

== Winners ==
2014 Malaysia Cup Winner

Pahang

4th Title
