= PFAM Player of the Month =

The PFAM Player of the Month is an association football award that recognises the best Malaysian League player each month of the season. The player nominated in the month will be selected by a panel comprising representatives from PFAM, asiana.my and media practitioners. Assessment will be made by the Nomination Committee PFAM Player of the Month Award – asiana.my comprising practitioners experienced sports media. Among the matters considered by the Nomination Committee is the player's performance during the month, the goal scored and assists. They are free to choose any player from the Premier League who they felt deserved to receive the award. Votes will be made through PFAM official website which is [www.pfam.my.] The voters can vote via desktop, laptop, smartphone, or tablet and can use all types of browsers. Anyone can vote for the candidates that was chosenfor the award. PFAM will include a list of nominations to the site for each month.

Organised by Professional Footballers Association of Malaysia, the Player of the Month award was introduced in May 2015, Wan Zaharulnizam Zakaria is the first winner for this award. The winner is picked via a votes in the PFAM official websites by the fan and will also be announced on their official websites. The most recent winner is Kelantan FA player, Mohammed Ghaddar for April 2017.

== Prize ==
In 2015, the winner received a trophy and picture contributed by All Sport Images and News Agency (asiana.my) and RM500 by MVP Sports Agency.

In 2016, MVP Sports Agency has added RM1000 into the money prize and making the money prize worth RM1500 along with a trophy and picture

== Selection panel ==
As of March 2017

- Fariz Fikri Zolkarnain from MVP Sport Agency Sdn Bhd.
- Saiyed Ismail Saiyed Hussin, sports journalist) from Saiyed Ismail Saiyed Hussin TV3
- Vijhay Vick, journalist from FourFourTwo (Malaysian edition)
- Aziman Rosdi, sport journalist from Harian Metro
- Ahmad Fazli, sport journalist from Kosmo!
- Ahmad Muzammil, chief editor from Semuanya BOLA

== Winners ==
Year	Month	Player	Nationality	Team	Position	Ref
2015	May	Wan Zaharulnizam	Malaysia	Kelantan	MF	
2015	June	(Malaysia) Muhammad Nurridzuan	Malaysia	Perak	MF	
2015	July	(Argentina) Luciano Figueroa	Johor Darul Ta'zim F.C.	FW		
2015	Aug.	(Canada) Issey Nakajima-Farran	Terengganu	MF		
2015	Sept.	(Brazil) Sandro Da Silva	Kedah	MF		
2015	Oct.	(Canada) Issey Nakajima-Farran	Terengganu	MF		
2015	Nov.	(Malaysia) Mohd Safiq Rahim	Malaysia	Johor Darul Ta'zim F.C.	MF	
2016	Feb.	(Malaysia) Mohd Faiz Subri	Malaysia	Penang FA	MF	
2016	Mar.	(Argentina) Jorge Pereyra Díaz	Johor Darul Ta'zim F.C.	FW		
2016	Apr.	(Argentina) Juan Martín Lucero	Johor Darul Ta'zim F.C.	FW		
2016	May.	(Malaysia) Izham Tarmizi Roslan	Malaysia	Johor Darul Ta'zim F.C.	GK	
2016	July	(Malaysia) Fazrul Hazli	Malaysia	Perak FA	MF	
2016	Aug.	(Malaysia) Baddrol Bakhtiar	Malaysia	Kedah FA	MF	
2016	Sept.	(Brazil) Thiago Augusto Fernandes	Kedah FA	FW		
2017	Feb.	(Malaysia) Baddrol Bakhtiar	Kedah FA	MF		
2017	Mar.	No award given due to limited number of matches in March				
2017	Apr.	(Lebanon) Mohammed Ghaddar	Kelantan FA	FW		
2017	Jul.	(Denmark) Ken Ilsø	Kedah FA	FW		
2017	Sep.	(Spain) (Malaysia) Natxo Insa	Johor Darul Ta'zim	MF		
2018	Feb.	(South Korea) Do Dong-hyun	Kelantan F.C.			
2018	Apr.	(Brazil) Sandro da Silva Mendonçai	Kedah F.C.	AM		
2018	May	(Socialist Federal Republic of Yugoslavia) Liridon Krasniqi	Kedah F.C.	AM		
2018	June	(Ivory Coast) Kipré Tchétché	Terengganu F.C.	FW		
2018	July	(Nigeria) Ifedayo Olusegun	Melaka United F.C.	FW		
2019	Feb.	(Singapore) Shakir Hamzah	Kedah F.C.	CB		
2019	Mar.	(Malaysia) Ifwat Akmal	Kedah F.C.	GK		
2019	Apr.	(Ivory Coast) Kipré Tchétché	Kedah F.C.	FW		
2019	May	(Nigeria) Ifedayo Olusegun	Melaka United F.C.	FW		
2019	June	(Malaysia) Baddrol Bakhtiar	Kedah F.C.	MF		
2019	July	(Malaysia) Safawi Rasid	Johor Darul Ta'zim F.C.	FW		
2023	August	Engku Nur Shakir	Terengganu FC	Malaysia	FW	

== Candidates ==
Indicates the Winner in that month

Year	Month	Candidate 1	Candidate 2	Candidate 3	Candidate 4	Candidate 5
2015	May	(Singapore) Khairul Amri	(Nigeria) Dickson Nwakaeme	(Nigeria) Austin Amutu	(Malaysia) Wan Zaharulnizam	(Malaysia) Hairuddin Omar
2015	June	(South Korea) Namkung Woong	(Argentina) Matías Conti	(Mali) Dramane Traoré	(Malaysia) Nurridzuan Abu Hassan	(Malaysia) Mohd Razman Roslan
2015	July	(Malaysia) Mohd Safiq Rahim	(Pakistan) Zesh Rehman	(Argentina) Luciano Figueroa	(Malaysia) Ismail Faruqi	(Malaysia) Mohd Hafiz Kamal
2015	August	(Malaysia) Nor Farhan Muhammad	(Canada) Issey Nakajima-Farran	(Malaysia) Ahmad Hazwan Bakri	(Malaysia) Baddrol Bakhtiar	(Brazil) Guilherme de Paula
2015	September	(Brazil) Sandro da Silva	(Malaysia) Azamuddin Akil	(Malaysia) Muhammad Farhan Roslan	(Malaysia) Azizon Abdul Kadir	(Malaysia) Mohd Badhri Mohd Radzi
2015	October	(Australia) Robert Cornthwaite	(Argentina) Gabriel Guerra	(Malaysia) Khairul Fahmi Che Mat	(Canada) Issey Nakajima-Farran	(Indonesia) Andik Vermansyah
2015	November	(Malaysia) Mohd Afiq Azmi	(Liberia) Zah Rahan Krangar	(Brazil) Thiago Augusto Fernandes	(Malaysia) Mohd Syazwan Zainon	(Malaysia) Mohd Safiq Rahim
2016	February	(Liberia) Zah Rahan Krangar	(Malaysia) Farizal Marlias	(Malaysia) Faiz Subri	(Malaysia) Norazlan Razali	(Singapore) Hariss Harun
2016	March	(Malaysia) Muhamad Hafizul Hakim	(Malaysia) R. Gopinathan	(Argentina) Jorge Pereyra Díaz	(Malaysia) Farhan Abu Bakar	(Canada) Issey Nakajima-Farran
2016	April	(Liberia) Francis Doe	(Argentina) Juan Martín Lucero	(Brazil) Patrick Cruz	(Malaysia) Wan Zaharulnizam	(Slovenia) Dalibor Volas
2016	May	(Malaysia) Ahmad Fakri Saarani	(Malaysia) Joseph Kalang Tie	(Argentina) Jorge Pereyra Díaz	(Timor-Leste) Junior Apreciado	(Malaysia) Izham Tarmizi Roslan
2016	July	(North Macedonia) Baže Ilijoski	(Liberia) Francis Doe	(South Korea) Jeong Seok-min	(Malaysia) Fazrul Hazli	(Brazil) Guilherme de Paula
2016	August	(Malaysia) Wan Zack Haikal	(Malaysia) Adam Nor Azlin	(Argentina) Jorge Pereyra Díaz	(Malaysia) Muhamad Hafizul Hakim	(Malaysia) Baddrol Bakhtiar
2016	September	(Malaysia) Matthew Davies	(Malaysia) Fakrul Aiman Sidid	(Brazil) Thiago Augusto Fernandes	(Argentina) Juan Martín Lucero	(Malaysia) Indra Putra Mahayuddin
2017	February	(Malaysia) Baddrol Bakhtiar	(Philippines) Mark Hartmann	(Brazil) Matheus Alves	(The Gambia) Mohamadou Sumareh	(Lebanon) Mohammed Ghaddar
2017	April	(Lebanon) Mohammed Ghaddar	(Malaysia) Safiq Rahim	(Malaysia) Nor Hakim Hassan	(Brazil) Matheus Alves	(Malaysia) Mohd Hafiz Kamal
2017	July	(Malaysia) Fadhli Shas	(Lebanon) Mohammed Ghaddar	(Denmark) Ken Ilsø	(Malaysia) Alif Haikal Sabri	(Brazil) Thiago Augusto Fernandes
2018	February	(Spain) Rufino Segovia	(Malaysia) Mahali Jasuli	(Ivory Coast) Kipré Tchétché	(Spain) (Malaysia) Natxo Insa	(South Korea) Do Dong-hyun

== Voting percentage ==
Year	Month	Candidates	Number of votes (Percentage)	Total votes
2017	July	(Denmark) Ken Ilsø	10,662 (74.53%)	14,305
2017	July	(Malaysia) Fadhli Shas	1,911 (13.36%)	14,305
2017	July	(Lebanon) Mohammed Ghaddar	818 (5.72%)	14,305
2017	July	(Brazil) Thiago Augusto Fernandes	624 (4.36%)	14,305
2017	July	(Malaysia) Alif Haikal Sabri	290 (2.03%)	14,305
2017	April	(Lebanon) Mohammed Ghaddar	6,560 (55.45%)	11,830
2017	April	(Malaysia) Mohd Safiq Rahim	3,815 (32.25%)	11,830
2017	April	(Malaysia) Mohd Hafiz Kamal	599 (5.06%)	11,830
2017	April	(Brazil) Matheus Alves	446 (3.77%)	11,830
2017	April	(Malaysia) Nor Hakim Hassan	410 (3.47%)	11,830
2017	February	(Malaysia) Baddrol Bakhtiar	17,073 (65.00%)	26,209
2017	February	(Lebanon) Mohammed Ghaddar	6,020 (23.00%)	26,209
2017	February	(Brazil) Matheus Alves	1,830 (7.00%)	26,209
2017	February	(Philippines) Mark Hartmann	765 (3.00%)	26,209
2017	February	(Liberia) Mohamadou Sumareh	521 (2.00%)	26,209
2016	September	(Brazil) Thiago Augusto Fernandes	7,530 (55.69%)	12,387
2016	September	(Argentina) Juan Martín Lucero	3,225 (23.97%)	12,387
2016	September	(Malaysia) Indra Putra Mahayuddin	1,983 (14.74%)	12,387
2016	September	(Australia) Matthew Davies	586 (4.35%)	12,387
2016	September	(Malaysia) Fakrul Aiman Sidid	133 (0.99%)	12,387
2016	August	(Malaysia) Baddrol Bakhtiar	7,146 (41.98%)	17,002
2016	August	(Argentina) Jorge Pereyra Díaz	5,686 (33.40%)	17,002
2016	August	(Malaysia) Wan Zack Haikal	1,764 (10.36%)	17,002
2016	August	(Malaysia) Muhamad Hafizul Hakim	1,708 (10.03%)	17,002
2016	August	(Malaysia) Adam Nor Azlin	718 (4.22%)	17,002

== Multiple winners ==
The below table lists those who have won on more than one occasion.

	indicates current Malaysia Super League player
Bold text	indicates players still playing professional football

Rank	Player	Wins
1st	Issey Nakajima-Farran	2
2nd	Baddrol Bakhtiar	2

== Awards won by position ==
As of July 2017

Position	Wins
Forward	6
Midfielder	8
Defender	0
Goalkeeper	1

== Awards won by nationality ==
As of 9 May 2017

Country	Wins
Malaysia	8
Argentina	3
Canada	2
Brazil	2
Lebanon	1
Denmark	1

== Awards won by club ==
As of July 2017

Club	Wins
Johor Darul Ta'zim F.C.	5
Kedah FA	5
Terengganu FA	2
Perak FA	2
Kelantan FA	2
Penang FA	1
