= 2014 in Singaporean football =

Football in Singapore
- Season: 2014

Men's football
- S.League: Warriors FC
- NFL Division One: Sporting Westlake
- NFL Division Two: Yishun Sentek Mariners
- Island Wide League: Kembangan United
- Singapore Cup: Balestier Khalsa
- League Cup: DPMM FC
- Charity Shield: Tampines Rovers

Women's football
- Women's Premier League: Eunos Crescent
- Women's Challenge Cup: Eunos Crescent

The 2014 season is the 62nd season of competitive football in Singapore.

== National teams ==
=== Singapore men's national football team ===
==== Results and fixtures ====
===== Friendlies =====
5 August 2014 Friendly	Bahrain	2–3	Singapore	Manama, Bahrain
19:30 UTC+3	3' (pen.); (red card) 52'	Report	Sahil 14', 61'; Shahfiq 45'	Stadium: Al Ahli Stadium
Note: The Singapore team is eligible for Asian Games, however they consist of non-U23 players.

6 September 2014 Friendly	Singapore	2–1	Papua New Guinea	Singapore
19:30 UTC+8	Sahil 17'; Fazrul 23'	Report	Gunemba 61'	Stadium: Hougang Stadium

9 September 2014 Friendly	Singapore	0–0	Hong Kong	Singapore
19:30 UTC+8		Report		Stadium: Hougang Stadium

10 October 2014 Friendly	Hong Kong	2–1	Singapore	Hong Kong
20:00 UTC+8	Xu 7'; Ju 52'	Report	Shahril 90+3'	Stadium: Mong Kok Stadium; Attendance: 4,000; Referee: Kao Jung Fang (Taiwan); Assistant referees: Lee Hung Ping, Chen Jia Hao (Taiwan); Fourth official: Chang Chih Chuan (Taiwan)
Note: Singapore Squad List

14 October 2014 Friendly	Macau	2–2	Singapore	Macau
19:00 UTC+8	Leong 53'; Torrão 90+3'	Report	Amri 23', 36'	Stadium: M.U.S.T. Stadium; Referee: Nivon Robesh Gamini (Sri Lanka); Assistant referees: Grant Rojas (Philippines); Zhong Yong (China); Fourth official: Chon Chan (Macau)
Note: Singapore Squad List

7 November 2014 Friendly	Bahrain	2–0	Singapore	Manama, Bahrain
20:00 UTC+3	Sami Al-Husaini 75'; Ismail Abdullatif 67'	Report		Stadium: Bahrain National Stadium
Note: Singapore squad list

13 November 2014 Friendly	Singapore	2–0	Laos	Singapore
20:00 UTC+8	Baihakki 5'; Amri 32'			Stadium: Yishun Stadium; Referee: Farhad Mohamad (Singapore); Assistant referees: Jeffrey Goh, Ong Chai Lee (Singapore); Fourth official: Ahmad A'Qashah (Singapore)
Note: Match Line-ups

17 November 2014 Friendly	Singapore	4–2	Cambodia	Singapore
20:00 UTC+8	Amri 9'; Faris 29'; Shahril 33'; Safuwan 37'	Report	Laboravy 27', 30'	Stadium: Yishun Stadium; Attendance: 1,989; Referee: Nagor Amir Noor Mohamed ( Malaysia); Assistant referees: Jeffrey Goh, Muhd Syarqawi Buhari (Singapore); Fourth official: Sukhbir Singh (Singapore)

===== 2015 AFC Asian Cup qualification =====
====== Group A ======
Team	Pld	W	D	L	GF	GA	GD	Pts	(Oman)	(Jordan)	(Syria)	(Singapore)
Oman	6	4	2	0	7	1	+6	14	—	0–0	1–0	3–1
Jordan	6	3	3	0	10	3	+7	12	0–0	—	2–1	4–0
Syria	6	1	1	4	7	7	0	4	0–1	1–1	—	4–0
Singapore	6	1	0	5	4	17	−13	3	0–2	1–3	2–1	—

2014

4 February 2014	Singapore	1–3	Jordan	Singapore
19:30 UTC+8	Amri 84' (pen.)	Report	Bawab 44'; Hayel 58'; Al-Rawashdeh 90+2'	Stadium: Jalan Besar Stadium; Attendance: 2,371; Referee: Tan Hai (China)

5 March 2014	Oman	3–1	Singapore	Muscat, Oman
17:30 UTC+4	Al Hosni 19'; Said 51'; Al-Hasani 69'	Report	Shahril 78'	Stadium: Sultan Qaboos Sports Complex, Attendance: 6,700; Referee: Ko Hyung-Jin (South Korea)

===== 2014 Suzuki Cup =====
====== Group B ======
Pos	Team	Pld	W	D	L	GF	GA	GD	Pts	Qualification
1	Thailand	3	3	0	0	7	3	+4	9	Advance to knockout stage
2	Malaysia	3	1	1	1	5	4	+1	4	Advance to knockout stage
3	Singapore	3	1	0	2	6	7	−1	3	
4	Myanmar	3	0	1	2	2	6	−4	1	

23 November 2014	Singapore	1–2	Thailand	Singapore
20:00 UTC+8	Amri 20'	Report	Mongkol 8'; Charyl 90' (pen.)	Stadium: National Stadium; Referee: Alireza Faghani (Iran); Assistant referees: Mansouri Mohammad Reza Davoud (Iran); Kim Young Ha (Korea); Fourth official: Ahmed Al-Kaf (Oman)

26 November 2014	Myanmar	2–4	Singapore	Singapore
20:00 UTC+8	Kyaw Zayar Win 55'; Kyaw Ko Ko 61' (pen.)	Report	Shaiful 15'; Hariss 15', 42'; Khin Maung Lwin 75' (o.g.)	Stadium: National Stadium; Referee: Ilgiz Tantashev (Uzbekistan); Assistant referees: Ruslan Serazitdinov (Uzbekistan); Fahad Awaiedh Al-Amri (Saudi Arabia); Fourth official: Çarymyrat Kurbanow (Turkmenistan)

29 November 2014	Singapore	1–3	Malaysia	Singapore
20:00 UTC+8	Amri 83'	Report	Safee 61'; Safiq 90+3' (pen.); Putra 90+5'	Stadium: National Stadium; Referee: Ahmed Al-Kaf (Oman); Assistant referees: Palitha Hemathunga (Sri Lanka); Kim Young Ha (Korea); Fourth official: Alireza Faghani (Iran)

=== Singapore women's national football team ===
The Singapore Women's National "A" team was inactive in 2014.

== Singapore Selection XI ==
=== Results and fixtures ===
==== Friendlies ====
16 August 2014 Friendly	Singapore XI	0–5	(Italy) Juventus FC	Singapore
19:30 UTC+3		Report	Pirlo 19', 42' (pen.); Pogba 49'; Giovinco 52'; Asamoah 71'	Stadium: National Stadium; Attendance: 27,338; Player of the Match: Pirlo
Note: Juventus line-ups. Singapore Selection is made up of the Lions and foreign stars from the S.League.

== Clubs competitions (Men's) ==
=== Pre-season ===
League	Promoted to league	Relegated from league
S.League	Not applicable	Not applicable
NFL Division One	Singapore Khalsa Association; Pioneer CSC	Singapore Cricket Club; Sembawang Sports Club
NFL Division Two	Starlight Soccerites; Tampines Vipers	Singapore Armed Forces SA; Mountbatten FC

=== Honours ===
Competition	Winners	Runners-Up	Match Report
Charity Shield	(Singapore) Tampines Rovers	(Singapore) Home United	Report
S.League	(Singapore) Warriors FC	(Brunei) DPMM FC	
Singapore Cup	(Singapore) Balestier Khalsa	(Singapore) Home United	Report
League Cup	(Brunei) DPMM FC	(Singapore) Tanjong Pagar United	Report
FA Cup	Singapore Recreation Club	(Singapore) Balestier Khalsa	Report
Prime League	(Singapore) Home United	(Singapore) NFA Reds U-18	
NFL Division One	(Singapore) Sporting Westlake	(Singapore) Police Sports Association	
NFL Division Two	(Singapore) Yishun Sentek Mariners	(Singapore) Siglap CSC	
Island Wide League	(Singapore) Kembangan United	(Singapore) Pioneer Ayer Rajah Soccerites	

=== LionsXII ===
==== Malaysia Super League ====
Final standings

Pos	Team	Pld	W	D	L	GF	GA	GD	Pts
6	Kelantan	22	10	1	11	26	29	−3	31
7	Sarawak	22	9	3	10	26	31	−5	30
8	LionsXII (Note: LionsXII are not eligible for any AFC competition spots)	22	8	4	10	26	27	−1	28
9	Perak	22	8	2	12	22	27	−5	26
10	ATM	22	6	6	10	29	34	−5	24

Source: RSSSF, FAM Official Site, Astro Arena
Rules for classification: 1) points; 2) goal difference; 3) number of goals scored

==== Malaysia FA Cup ====
21 January 2013 Round of 32	LionsXII	3-0	(Kuala Lumpur) DRB-Hicom	Singapore
19:45 UTC+8	Sufian 27'; Quak 53'; Faris 90+3'	Report		Stadium: Bishan Stadium; Referee: P Jeevanathan

1 February 2013 Round of 16	LionsXII	1-2	Pahang	Singapore
16:15 UTC+8	Safuwan 86'	Report	Mohd Hafiz 50'; Azidan 54'	Stadium: Jalan Besar Stadium; Referee: Syed Azhar Syed Kamar (Kuala Lumpur)

==== Malaysia Cup ====
Group A

Team	Pld	W	D	L	GF	GA	GD	Pts	(Kuala Lumpur) FEL	(Pahang) PAH	(Singapore) LNS	(Johor) JDT2
(Kuala Lumpur) Felda United (A)	6	4	1	1	12	8	+4	13		0–2	3–1	3–2
Pahang (A)	6	3	1	2	12	7	+5	10	2–3		1–2	4–0
(Singapore) LionsXII	6	1	2	3	7	10	−3	5	0–0	1–2		2–2
Johor DT II	6	1	2	3	8	14	−6	5	1–3	1–1	2–1	

(A) Advanced to the 2014 Piala Malaysia quarter finals

== League competitions (Women's) ==
=== Honours ===
==== League and Cup winners ====
Competition	Winner	Runner-up	Venue
Women's Premier League	(Singapore) Eunos Crescent	(Singapore) Police Sports Association	N/A
Women's Challenge Cup	(Singapore) Eunos Crescent	National University of Singapore	
