= 2014 Malaysia Cup group stage =

The 2014 Piala Malaysia group stage featured 16 teams. The teams were drawn into fourth groups of four, and played each other home-and-away in a round-robin format. The top two teams in each group advanced to the 2014 Piala Malaysia quarter finals.

== Groups ==
The matchdays were 13–23 August, and 26 August–3 September 2014.

=== Group A ===
Team	Pld	W	D	L	GF	GA	GD	Pts	(Kuala Lumpur) FEL	(Pahang) PAH	(Singapore) LNS	(Johor) JDT2
(Kuala Lumpur) Felda United (A)	6	4	1	1	12	8	+4	13		0–2	3–1	3–2
Pahang (A)	6	3	1	2	12	7	+5	10	2–3		1–2	4–0
(Singapore) LionsXII	6	1	2	3	7	10	−3	5	0–0	1–2		2–2
Johor DT II	6	1	2	3	8	14	−6	5	1–3	1–1	2–1	

(A) Advanced to the 2014 Piala Malaysia quarter finals
13 August 2014
19:45

LionsXII	0–0	Felda United

Jalan Besar Stadium, Kallang
Attendance: 4,199
Referee: Wan Mohd Tarmizi
13 August 2014
20:45

Pahang	4–0	Johor Darul Takzim II
Nwakaeme 5', 71'; Conti 38'; Fauzi 90+3'	Report

Darul Makmur Stadium, Kuantan
Attendance: 9,500
Referee: Nazmi Nasaruddin

19 August 2014
19:45

LionsXII	1–2	Pahang
Faris 90+4'		Nwakaeme 13'; Fauzi 88'

Jalan Besar Stadium, Kallang
Attendance: 4,187
Referee: Zulkifli Ahmad
19 August 2014
20:45

Felda United	3–2	Johor Darul Takzim II
Syamim 5'; Edward 30'; Shahrulnizam 82'		Zaquan 49'; Shafiq 58'

Majlis Perbandaran Selayang Stadium, Selayang
Attendance: 500
Referee: Mohd Fairuzi

23 August 2014
20:45

Pahang	2–3	Felda United
Gopinathan 18'; Conti 50' (pen.)		Edward 23', 64'; Shukor 77'

Darul Makmur Stadium, Kuantan
Attendance: 12,000
Referee: Suhaizi Shukri
23 August 2014
20:45

Johor Darul Takzim II	2–1	LionsXII
Shafiq 21'; Fandi 84'		Hafiz 51'

Pasir Gudang Corporation Stadium, Pasir Gudang
Attendance: 2,000
Referee: Lismothia Mohem

26 August 2014
19:45

LionsXII	2–2	Johor Darul Takzim II
Hafiz 1'; Faris 83'		Yusof 10'; Akmal 65'

Jalan Besar Stadium, Kallang
Attendance: 4,026
Referee: Samsuddin Ibrahim
26 August 2014
20:45

Felda United	0–2	Pahang
		Gopinathan 67'; Nwakaeme 90+2' (pen.)

Majlis Perbandaran Selayang Stadium, Selayang
Attendance: 4,500
Referee: Nagor Amir

29 August 2014
20:45

Pahang	1–2	LionsXII
Nwakaeme 13'		Sufian 51'; Madhu 84'

Darul Makmur Stadium, Kuantan
Attendance: 11,000
Referee: Teoh Hee Loon
29 August 2014
20:45

Johor Darul Takzim II	1–3	Felda United
Delmonte 87'		Edward 5'; Syamim 15'; Shukor 49'

Pasir Gudang Corporation Stadium, Pasir Gudang
Attendance: 1,950
Referee: Suhaizi Shukri

2 September 2014
20:45

Johor Darul Takzim II	1–1	Pahang
Delmonte 14'		Rehman 73'

Pasir Gudang Corporation Stadium, Pasir Gudang
Attendance: 2,000
Referee: Zulkifli Ahmad
2 September 2014
20:45

Felda United	3–1	LionsXII
Zah Rahan 9'; Indra Putra 26'; Makeche 27'		Faris 22'

Majlis Perbandaran Selayang Stadium, Selayang
Attendance: 500
Referee: Jefri Zulkifli

=== Group B ===
Team	Pld	W	D	L	GF	GA	GD	Pts	(Kedah) KED	(Terengganu) TER	(Perak) PRK	(Sarawak) SAR
Kedah (A)	6	3	1	2	11	9	+2	10		2–3	2–0	2–1
Terengganu (A)	6	2	3	1	10	9	+1	9	2–2		2–1	0–0
Perak	6	2	2	2	7	7	0	8	2–1	1–1		2–0
Sarawak	6	1	2	3	6	9	−3	5	1–2	3–2	1–1	

(A) Advanced to the 2014 Piala Malaysia quarter finals
14 August 2014
20:45

Sarawak	3–2	Terengganu
Griffiths 10' (pen.), 30'; Chanturu 45+2'	Report	Karlović 58'; Zairo 88' (pen.)

Sarawak State Stadium, Kuching
Attendance: 8,000
Referee: Zukilfi Ahmad
14 August 2014
20:45

Perak	2–1	Kedah
Purović 10'; Hafiz Ramdan 52'	Report	Mehmet 44'

Perak Stadium, Ipoh
Attendance: 6,000
Referee: Syed Azhar

20 August 2014
20:45

Kedah	2–3	Terengganu
Mehmet 45+2'; Baddrol 59'		Ashaari 8', 45'; Karlović 74'

Darul Aman Stadium, Alor Star
Attendance: 6,000
Referee: Nagor Amir
20 August 2014
20:45

Perak	2–0	Sarawak
Nasir 45'; Abdulafees 49'

Perak Stadium, Ipoh
Attendance: 7,000
Referee: Zamzaidi Kartimin

23 August 2014
20:45

Terengganu	2–1	Perak
Manaf 30'; Nor Farhan 50'		Nazri 32'

Sultan Ismail Nasiruddin Shah Stadium, Kuala Terengganu
Attendance: 7,000
Referee: Teoh Hee Loon
23 August 2014
20:45

Sarawak	1–2	Kedah
Griffiths 49'		Farhan Roslan 32'; Mehmet 90+4'

Sarawak State Stadium, Kuching
Attendance: 8,500
Referee: Zohri Tajuddin

27 August 2014
20:45

Perak	1–1	Terengganu
Bikana 47' (o.g.)		Nordin 88'

Perak Stadium, Ipoh
Attendance: 10,000
Referee: Nazmi Nasaruddin
27 August 2014
20:45

Kedah	2–1	Sarawak
Mehmet 53'; Syazwan 90+1'		S. Chanturu 20'

Darul Aman Stadium, Alor Star
Attendance: 6,500
Referee: Syed Azhar

30 August 2014
20:45

Terengganu	2–2	Kedah
Ashaari 36'; Faruqi 78'		Baddrol 45+2'; Namkung 69'

Sultan Ismail Nasiruddin Shah Stadium, Kuala Terengganu
Attendance: 6,500
Referee: Zulkifli Ahmad
30 August 2014
20:45

Sarawak	1–1	Perak
Hairol 60'		Tulio 77'

Sarawak State Stadium, Kuching
Attendance: 5,000
Referee: Nafeez Abd Wahab

3 September 2014
20:45

Terengganu	0–0	Sarawak

Sultan Ismail Nasiruddin Shah Stadium, Kuala Terengganu
Attendance: 6,000
Referee: Lismotea Mohem
3 September 2014
20:45

Kedah	2–0	Perak
Mehmet 72'; Baddrol 76'

Darul Aman Stadium, Alor Star
Attendance: 15,000
Referee: Zamzaidi Kartimin

=== Group C ===
Team	Pld	W	D	L	GF	GA	GD	Pts	(Johor) JDT	(Kelantan) KEL	ATM	(Penang) PEN
Johor DT (A)	6	5	1	0	13	1	+12	16		1–0	0–0	5–0
Kelantan (A)	6	3	0	3	10	8	+2	9	0–3		1–2	3–1
ATM	6	1	2	3	4	8	−4	5	0–1	0–3		1–1
Penang	6	1	1	4	6	16	−10	4	1–3	1–3	2–1	

(A) Advanced to the 2014 Piala Malaysia quarter finals
13 August 2014
20:45

Johor Darul Takzim	1–0	Kelantan
Safiq 72'	Report

Tan Sri Dato Haji Hassan Yunos Stadium, Johor Bahru
Attendance: 20,000
Referee: Samsuddin Ibrahim
13 August 2014
20:45

ATM	1–1	Penang
Hairuddin 26'		Rafiuddin 45'

Majlis Perbandaran Selayang Stadium, Selayang
Attendance: 1,500
Referee: Amirul Izwan

19 August 2014
20:45

Johor Darul Takzim	0–0	ATM

Tan Sri Dato Haji Hassan Yunos Stadium, Johor Bahru
Attendance: 12,000
Referee: Wan Mohd Tarmizi
19 August 2014
20:45

Kelantan	3–1	Penang
Fakri 10', 87'; Doe 22' (pen.)		Rafiuddin 59'

Sultan Mohammad IV Stadium, Kota Bharu
Attendance: 5,000
Referee: Zohri Tajudin

23 August 2014
20:45

Penang	1–3	Johor Darul Takzim
Lee Kil-hoon 66'		Amri 13'; Safiq 15'; Díaz 67'

City Stadium, Penang
Attendance: 12,000
Referee: Syed Azhar
23 August 2014
20:45

ATM	0–3	Kelantan
		Doe 52'; Badhri 61', 89'

Shah Alam Stadium, Shah Alam
Attendance: 6,000
Referee: Zamzaidi Katimin

26 August 2014
20:45

Johor Darul Takzim	5–0	Penang
Díaz 3'; Figueroa 29' (pen.), pen.' Amri 38'; Hariss 82'

Tan Sri Dato Haji Hassan Yunos Stadium, Johor Bahru
Attendance: 15,000
Referee: Zulkifli Ahmad
26 August 2014
20:45

Kelantan	1–2	ATM
Doe 43'		Arostegui 77'; Hairuddin 86'

Sultan Mohammad IV Stadium, Kota Bharu
Attendance: 5,000
Referee: Suhaizi Shukri

=== Group D ===
Team	Pld	W	D	L	GF	GA	GD	Pts	(Malaysia) PDRM	(Selangor) SEL	(Kuala Lumpur) SDA	(Terengganu) TTM
(Malaysia) PDRM (A)	6	5	1	0	15	4	+11	16		1–1	3–1	4–1
Selangor (A)	6	3	1	2	7	6	+1	10	0–2		1–2	1–0
(Kuala Lumpur) Sime Darby	6	2	0	4	6	12	−6	6	0–3	0–2		2–1
(Terengganu) T-Team	6	1	0	5	6	12	−6	3	1–2	1–2	2–1	

(A) Advanced to the 2014 Piala Malaysia quarter finals
13 August 2014
20:45

T-Team	1–2	Selangor
Wanggai 49'	Report	Andik 51'; Rangel 53'

Sultan Ismail Nasiruddin Shah Stadium, Kuala Terengganu
Attendance: 1,500
Referee: Nagor Amir
14 August 2014
20:45

Sime Darby	0–3	PDRM
	Report	Ashfaq 16', 48' (pen.); Bobby 35'

Majlis Perbandaran Selayang Stadium, Selayang
Attendance: 500
Referee: Zamzaidi Kartimin

20 August 2014
20:45

Selangor	0–2	PDRM
		Ashfaq 13' (pen.); Charles Souza 68'

Shah Alam Stadium, Shah Alam
Attendance: 4,000
Referee: Samsuddin Ibrahim
20 August 2014
20:45

T-Team	2–1	Sime Darby
Leandro 58' (pen.); Ramzul 82'		Sharofetdinov 44' (pen.)

Sultan Ismail Nasiruddin Shah Stadium, Kuala Terengganu
Attendance: 600
Referee: Jefri Zolkifli

23 August 2014
20:45

PDRM	4–1	T-Team
Bobby 12', 65'; Ashfaq 23'; Charles Souza 83'		Mulisa 86'

Tuanku Abdul Rahman Stadium, Paroi
Attendance: 300
Referee: Fairuzi Mat Desa
23 August 2014
20:45

Sime Darby	0–2	Selangor
		Rangel 18'; Hazwan 33'

Majlis Perbandaran Selayang Stadium, Selayang
Attendance: 2,000
Referee: Nazmi Nasaruddin

27 August 2014
20:45

Selangor	1–2	Sime Darby
Hazwan 63'		Fahrul Razi 75'; Roskam 82'

Shah Alam Stadium, Shah Alam
Attendance: 3,500
Referee: Amirul Izwan
27 August 2014
20:45

T-Team	1–2	PDRM
Mulisa 51'		Ashfaq 20' (pen.), 86'

Sultan Ismail Nasiruddin Shah Stadium, Kuala Terengganu
Attendance: 700
Referee: Zamzaidi Kartimin
