= Professional Footballers Association of Malaysia =

- Persatuan Pemain-Pemain Bolasepak Profesional Malaysia
- Abbreviation: PFAM
- Formation: 2009; 17 years ago
- Headquarters: Plaza Damas 3, Sri Hartamas, Kuala Lumpur
- Location: Kuala Lumpur, Malaysia
- Region served: Malaysia
- President: Safee Sali
- Vice-President: Razman Roslan
- CEO: Izham Ismail
- Affiliations: FIFPRO
- Staff: 7
- Website: pfam.my

The Professional Footballers Association of Malaysia (Malay: Persatuan Pemain-Pemain Bolasepak Profesional Malaysia, abbrev: PFAM) is a representative organisation for professional football players in Malaysia, established in 2014. It is affiliated with the worldwide professional football players organisation, FIFPro, since 22 October 2013. It was registered with the Malaysia Sports Commissioner's Office on 4 August 2014.

PFAM was inactive for a few years until it was reactivated in 2013, with Hairuddin Omar elected as president of the association.

For the 2021-2023 session, Safee Sali led the organization and was assisted by Razman Roslan as vice president.

PFAM is vocal about welfares of football players in Malaysia, whether still active of retired. PFAM also is responsible for the PFAM Player of the Month award, given to the best player in Malaysia football monthly.

== Objective ==
PFA Malaysia was established to promote, advance and protect the interest of professional footballers in Malaysia. It exists to support and provide advice to, and represent professional footballers in Malaysia in matters pertaining to their relations with Football Association of Malaysia (FAM), clubs, state football associations or any other body responsible for or in any way connected with the administration of football in Malaysia.

PFA Malaysia also provides legal advice and assistance to professional footballers in Malaysia in respect of their professional contractual obligations with their clubs or state football associations, and PFA Malaysia acts as an exclusive representative body and collective bargaining agent of Malaysia's professional footballers.

PFA Malaysia also seeks to promote professional football as a stable, secure and worthwhile career, and provides advice and assistance to Malaysia's professional footballers in their career development.

With the support of FIFPRO, PFA Malaysia seeks to establish an international network to enable Malaysia's professional footballers to have an input in international decision-making in matters pertaining to the game of football.

PFA Malaysia brands themselves with the motto, "Supporting the Players, Building the Game."

== PFAM-asiana.my Player of the Month Award ==
In 2015, PFAM created an award to be given to player;

- PFAM Player of the Month

In 2016, they created another award;

- PFAM Player of the Month (Malaysia Premier League)

== PFAM Executive ==
Position	Name	Others
Chief Executive Officer	Izham Ismail	LL.B (Hons) Malaya
Administrative Executive	Hanani Azren Husin	LL.B Sh & Civ (Hons) USIM; LL.M (Hons) UKM
Media Executive	Muhammad Syamil M Rosli	
Legal Executive	Muhammad Syafiq Jebat	LL.B (Hons) UiTM
Communications Executive	Afiq Eizzuddin Ahmad Shaupi	
Member Services & Events Executive	Nur Alisa Farhana Mohd Zukari	
Admin Assistant	Nur Syazwani Sazali	

== PFAM Committee ==
For session 2021 - 2023

Position	Name	Others
President	Safee Sali	
Vice President	Razman Roslan	
Secretary	Zaquan Adha	(Negeri Sembilan, Malaysia Super League) player
Treasurer	Farizal Marlias	(Johor Darul Ta'zim F.C., Malaysia Super League) player
Exco	Khairul Fahmi Che Mat	(Sabah, Malaysia Super League) player
Exco	Mahalli Jasuli	(Negeri Sembilan, Malaysia Super League) player
Exco	Shahril Sa'ari	
Exco	Steffi Sarge Kaur	(Women's National Football Team Captain,

== PFAM Social Media ==
As on 1st March 2023

Social Media	URL	Followers
Facebook	www.facebook.com/pfam.my//	38,160 Followers
Twitter	twitter.com/pfamalaysia//	15,400 Followers
Instagram	www.instagram.com/pfamalaysia///	81,600 Followers

== See also ==
- Football Association of Malaysia
