= Nwakaeme =

- Gender: Male
- Language: Igbo

Origin
- Origin: Nigerian
- Meaning: A child does the most (good).
- Region of origin: South East, Nigeria

Nwakaeme audio is a Nigerian male given name and surname of Igbo origin. It means "A child does the most (good)." The name Nwakaeme is distinctive, carrying a strong and meaningful undertone.

== Notable individuals with the name ==
- Anthony Nwakaeme (born 1989), Nigerian professional footballer
- Dickson Nwakaeme (born 1986), Nigerian professional footballer
