= Izham Tarmizi =

Malaysian footballer (born 1991)

Personal information
- Full name: Mohd Izham Tarmizi bin Roslan
- Date of birth: 24 April 1991 (age 35)
- Place of birth: Terengganu, Malaysia
- Height: 1.73 m (5 ft 8 in)
- Position: Goalkeeper

Youth career
- 2009–2010: T-Team U19

Senior career*
Years	Team	Apps	(Gls)
2010	Harimau Muda B	22	(0)
2011–2013	Harimau Muda A	34	(0)
2014–2025	Johor Darul Ta'zim	37	(0)
2023	→ Sri Pahang (loan)	14	(0)

International career^{‡}
2011–2014	Malaysia U-23	26	(0)
2014–	Malaysia	7	(0)
Medal record
Malaysia U23
Sea Games
Gold medal – first place	Sea Games 2011	Football
- * Club domestic league appearances and goals as of 9 December 2022 ‡ National team caps and goals as of 17 November 2016

Mohd Izham Tarmizi bin Roslan (born 24 April 1991) is a Malaysian professional footballer who last played as a goalkeeper for Malaysia Super League club Johor Darul Ta'zim.

== Club career ==
=== Harimau Muda ===
Izham started off his career at Harimau Muda B which played in the 2010 Malaysia Premier League.

In 2011, Izham was then promoted to the ''A'' team of Harimau Muda A which played in the first tier of the Malaysia football league, the 2011 Malaysia Super League.

In 2012, Harimau Muda moved their trade playing in Singapore ahead of the 2012 S.League where he was picked as the main goalkeeper throughout the season.

=== Johor Darul Ta'zim ===
In October 2014, Izham joined Johor Darul Ta'zim. Izham was instrumental during the club 2015 AFC Cup run where he would go on to lift the trophy at the end keeping three clean sheet in the tournament.

From the 2018 Malaysia Super League season onwards, Izham would the see his starting line-up being taken by Farizal Marlias as he was dropped to the bench.

On 18 April 2022, Izham make his AFC Champions League debut in the 2022 tournament coming on in the 78' minute as Haziq Nazli got injured throughout the match.

On 29 June 2024, Izham make his first appearance for the club after returning from his loan spell at Sri Pahang. He played in the first leg of the 2024 Malaysia FA Cup match against Malaysian University where he kept a clean sheet in a 5–0 victory.

=== Sri Pahang ===
On 29 December 2022, Izham was loaned out to Sri Pahang ahead of the 2023 Malaysia Super League season for regular playing time. He make his debut on 26 February 2023 against Negeri Sembilan in a 1–1 draw.

== International career ==
Izham was called up to Malaysia national team on 7 October 2015 where he would make his international debut on 17 November 2015 in the 2018 FIFA World Cup qualification match against UAE.

== Personal life ==
Izham is married to a Malaysian actress Mia Ahmad with 2 children.

== Career statistics ==
=== Club ===
As of match played 28 October 2019.

Appearances and goals by club, season and competition
Club	Season	League			Cup		League Cup		Continental		Other		Total	
Club	Season	Division	Apps	Goals	Apps	Goals	Apps	Goals	Apps	Goals	Apps	Goals	Apps	Goals
Harimau Muda B	2010	Malaysia Premier League	22	10	10	0	0	0	–		–		0	0
Harimau Muda B	Total		22	0	0	0	0	0	–		–		0	0
Harimau Muda A	2011	Malaysia Super League	14	0	0	0	0	0	–		–		0	0
Harimau Muda A	2012	S.League	20	0	0	0	0	0	–		–		0	0
Harimau Muda A	Total		34	0	0	0	0	0	–		–		0	0
Johor Darul Ta'zim	2014	Malaysia Super League	16	0	0	0	0	0	–		–		0	0
Johor Darul Ta'zim	2015	Malaysia Super League	4	0	0	0	0	0	7	0	1 (Note: International club friendlies against Borussia Dortmund)	0	14	0
Johor Darul Ta'zim	2016	Malaysia Super League	10	0	3	0	0	0	9	0	–		0	0
Johor Darul Ta'zim	2017	Malaysia Super League	13	0	4	0	7	0	3	0	–		27	0
Johor Darul Ta'zim	2018	Malaysia Super League	2	0	1	0	0	0	4	0	–		7	0
Johor Darul Ta'zim	2019	Malaysia Super League	2	0	1	0	0	0	3	0	–		6	0
Johor Darul Ta'zim	2020	Malaysia Super League	0	0	0	0	0	0	0	0	–		0	0
Johor Darul Ta'zim	2021	Malaysia Super League	0	0	0	0	0	0	0	0	–		0	0
Johor Darul Ta'zim	2022	Malaysia Super League	0	0	0	0	0	0	1	0	–		1	0
Johor Darul Ta'zim	Total		37	0	9	0	7	0	27	0	1	0	81	0
Career Total			93	0	9	0	7	0	27	0	1	0	137	0

=== International ===
As of 13 November 2017

Appearances and goals by national team and year
National team	Year	Apps	Goals
Malaysia	2015	2	0
Malaysia	2016	5	0
Total		7	0

== Honours ==
=== Club ===
Johor Darul Ta'zim

- Malaysia Super League: 2014, 2015, 2016, 2017, 2018, 2019, 2020, 2021, 2022, 2024–25
- Piala Sumbangsih: 2015, 2016, 2018, 2019, 2020, 2021, 2022
- Malaysia FA Cup: 2016, 2022, 2024
- AFC Cup: 2015
- Malaysia Cup: 2017, 2019 2022, 2024–25

=== International ===
Malaysia

- Southeast Asian Games: 2011 Gold

=== Individual ===
- PFAM Player of the Month: May 2016
