= PFAM Player of the Month (Malaysia Premier League) =

Malaysian League player

The PFAM Player of the Month (Malaysia Premier League) is an association football award that recognises the best Malaysian League player that played in the Malaysia Premier League each month of the season.

The player nominated in the month will be selected by a panel comprising representatives from PFAM, asiana.my, 139associates and media practitioners.

"We received a proposal from the PFAM members itself and also the fans who ask for the award to be extended to the premier league," PFAM Chief Executive Officer, Izham Ismail said after launching the Award for the Premier League Player of the Month in 2016 at Subang.

Assessment will be made by the Nomination Committee PFAM Player of the Month Award - asiana.my comprising practitioners who are experienced in sports media. Among the matters considered by the Nomination Committee is the player's performance during the month, the goals scored and assists made. They are free to choose any player from the Premier League who they felt deserved to receive the award. Votes will be made through the website which is the PFAM official website. The voters can vote via desktop, laptop, smartphone, or tablet and can use all types of browsers. Anyone can vote for the candidates that have been chosen for the award. PFAM will include a list of nominations on the site for each month.

Organised by Professional Footballers Association of Malaysia, the Player of the Month award was introduced in July 2016, Ilija Spasojevic is the first winner for this award. The most recent winner is Negeri Sembilan FA player, Mohd Nasriq Baharom for April 2017.

== Prize ==
For 2016, the winner received a trophy contributed by All Sport Images and News Agency (asiana.my) and RM500 by 139associates.

== Winners ==
Year	Month	Player	Team	Position	Ref
2016	July	(Montenegro) Ilija Spasojević	Melaka United F.C.	FW	
2016	August	(Montenegro) Ilija Spasojević	Melaka United F.C.	FW	
2016	September	(Croatia) Ivan Babić	DRB-Hicom F.C.	FW	
2017	February	(Brazil) (Japan) Bruno Suzuki	Negeri Sembilan FA	FW	
2017	March	No award given due to limited number of matches in March			
2017	April	(Malaysia) Mohd Nasriq Baharom	Negeri Sembilan FA	DF	
2017	July	(Malaysia) Shahrel Fikri	PKNP F.C.	FW	

== Candidates ==
Indicates the Winner in that month

Year	Month	Candidate 1	Candidate 2	Candidate 3	Candidate 4	Candidate 5
2016	July	(Malaysia) Mohd Zaquan Adha	(Brazil) Rafael de Jesus Bonfim	(Argentina) Gabriel Miguel Guerra	(Palestine) Yashir Pinto	(Montenegro) Ilija Spasojevic
2016	August	(Argentina) Juan Manuel Cobelli	(Brazil) Paulo Rangel	(Malaysia) R. Surendran	(Montenegro) Ilija Spasojevic	(Malaysia) Solehin Mamat
2016	September	(England) Alex Smith	(Palestine) Matías Jadue	(Ivory Coast) Dao Bakary	(Malaysia) Mohd Afif Amiruddin	(Croatia) Ivan Babic
2017	February	(Ivory Coast) Dao Bakary	(Uzbekistan) Lutfulla Turaev	(Cameroon) Dimitri Bodric	(Malaysia) Shahrel Fikri	(Brazil) (Japan) Bruno Suzuki
2017	April	(Brazil) Guilherme de Paula	(Malaysia) Shahrel Fikri	(Nigeria) Akanni-Sunday	(Malaysia) Nasriq Baharom	(Argentina) Jeronimo Barrales
2017	April	(Brazil) Paulo Josue	(Malaysia) Shahrel Fikri	(Brazil) Guilherme de Paula Lucrecio	(Nigeria) Akanni-Sunday Wasiu	(Ivory Coast) Kipre Tchetche

== Voting Percentage ==
Year	Month	Candidates	Number of Votes (Percentage)	Total Votes
2017	July	(Malaysia) Shahrel Fikri	1,103 (52.32%)	2,108
2017	July	(Ivory Coast) Kipre Tchetche	885 (41.98%)	2,108
2017	July	(Brazil) Paulo Josue	52 (2.47%)	2,108
2017	July	(Brazil) Guilherme de Paula Lucrecio	50 (2.37%)	2,108
2017	July	(Nigeria) Akannni-Sunday Wasiu	18 (0.85%)	2,108
2017	April	(Malaysia) Mohd Nasriq Baharom	1,405 (40.25%)	3,491
2017	April	(Argentina) Jerónimo Barrales	1,146 (32.83%)	3,491
2017	April	(Malaysia) Shahrel Fikri	597 (17.10%)	3,491
2017	April	(Nigeria) Akanni-Sunday Wasiu	229 (6.56%)	3,491
2017	April	(Brazil) Guilherme de Paula Lucrécio	114 (3.27%)	3,491
2017	February	(Brazil) (Japan) Bruno Suzuki	1,686 (51.46%)	3,269
2017	February	(Malaysia) Shahrel Fikri	1,081 (33.00%)	3,269
2017	February	(Uzbekistan) Lutfulla Turaev	354 (10.08%)	3,269
2017	February	(Cameroon) Bodric Dimitri	137 (4.20%)	3,269
2017	February	(Ivory Coast) Dao Bakary	11 (0.40%)	3,269
2016	September	(Croatia) Ivan Babić	24,429 (96.54%)	25,305
2016	September	(Malaysia) Mohd Afif Amiruddin	321 (1.27%)	25,305
2016	September	(England) Alex Smith	193 (0.76%)	25,305
2016	September	(Ivory Coast) Dao Bakary	183 (0.72%)	25,305
2016	September	(Palestine) Matías Jadue	179 (0.71%)	25,305

== Multiple winners ==
The below table lists those who have won on more than one occasion.

	Indicates current Malaysia Premier League player
Bold Text	Indicates players still playing professional football

Rank	Player	Wins
1st	Ilija Spasojevic	2

== Awards won by position ==
As of July 2017

Position	Wins
Forward	5
Midfielder	0
Defender	1
Goalkeeper	0

== Awards won by nationality ==
As of 10 May 2017

Country	Wins
Montenegro	2
Malaysia	2
Croatia	1
Japan (Note: Bruno Suzuki has a Japan citizenship)	1
Brazil (Note: Bruno Suzuki was born in Brazil)	1

== Awards won by club ==
As of 10 May 2017

Club	Wins
Melaka United F.C.	2
Negeri Sembilan FA	2
DRB-Hicom F.C.	1
PKNP F.C.	1
