= 2014 Malaysia Cup =

2014 Piala Malaysia
Piala Malaysia

Tournament details
- Country: Malaysia; Singapore
- Teams: 16

Final positions
- Champions: Pahang FA (4th title)
- Runner-up: Johor Darul Ta'zim

Tournament statistics
- Matches played: 61
- Goals scored: 193 (3.16 per match)
- Top goal scorer(s): 8 goals Dickson Nwakaeme

Awards
- Best player: Safiq Rahim

The 2014 Malaysia Cup (Malay: Piala Malaysia 2014) was the 88th edition of the Piala Malaysia, a football tournament held annually by the Football Association of Malaysia. The cup began on August with a preliminary round. A total of 16 teams took part in the competition. The teams were divided into four groups, each containing four teams. The group winners and runner-up teams in the groups after six matches qualified to the quarterfinals. The 2014 Piala Malaysia ended on 1 November 2014 with the final, held at Bukit Jalil National Stadium, where Pahang defeated Johor Darul Ta'zim after a penalty shootout.

Pahang were the defending champions, having beaten Kelantan 1–0 in the previous season's final.

== Format ==
In this competition, the top 10 teams from 2014 Malaysia Super League is joined by the top 4 teams from 2014 Malaysia Premier League. The remaining 2 teams from 2014 Malaysia Super League and the team who finished 5th and 6th place in the 2014 Malaysia Premier League will battle it out in the playoffs for the remaining 2 spots. The teams will be drawn into four groups of four teams.

== Round and draw dates ==
The draw for the 2014 Piala Malaysia was held on 13 July 2014 at the Dewan Perdana, National Sports Institute with the participating team coaches and captains in attendance.

Phase	Round	Draw date	First leg	Second leg
Play-off	Play-off round		28 June 2014	
Group stage	Matchday 1	13 July 2014 (Kuala Lumpur)	13 & 14 August 2014	
Group stage	Matchday 2	13 July 2014 (Kuala Lumpur)	19 & 20 August 2014	
Group stage	Matchday 3	13 July 2014 (Kuala Lumpur)	22 & 23 August 2014	
Group stage	Matchday 4	13 July 2014 (Kuala Lumpur)	26 & 27 August 2014	
Group stage	Matchday 5	13 July 2014 (Kuala Lumpur)	29 & 30 August 2014	
Group stage	Matchday 6	13 July 2014 (Kuala Lumpur)	2 & 3 September 2014	
Knockout phase	Quarter-finals	13 July 2014 (Kuala Lumpur)	3 October 2014	10 & 11 October 2014
Knockout phase	Semi-finals	13 July 2014 (Kuala Lumpur)	17 & 18 October 2014	24 October & 25 October 2014
Knockout phase	Final	13 July 2014 (Kuala Lumpur)	1 November 2014	

== Play-off ==
28 Jun 2014
21:30

T-Team (Terengganu)	1–0	(Negeri Sembilan) N. Sembilan
Ramzul 42'	Report

Shah Alam Stadium, Shah Alam

28 Jun 2014
21:30

PKNS (Selangor)	1–2	Johor DT II
Primorac 77'	Report	Zaquan 45+2'; Akmal 70'

Selayang Stadium, Selayang
Referee: Syed Azhar

== Seeding ==
Pot 1	Pot 2	Pot 3	Pot 4
(Johor) JDT (Selangor) SEL (Pahang) PAH (Terengganu) TER	(Kuala Lumpur) SDA (Kelantan) KEL (Sarawak) SAR (Singapore) LNS	(Perak) PRK; ATM (Malaysia) PDRM (Kuala Lumpur) FEL	(Penang) PEN (Kedah) KED (Terengganu) TTM (Johor) JDT2

== Group stage ==
=== Group A ===
Team	Pld	W	D	L	GF	GA	GD	Pts	(Kuala Lumpur) FEL	(Pahang) PAH	(Singapore) LNS	(Johor) JDT2
(Kuala Lumpur) Felda United (A)	6	4	1	1	12	8	+4	13		0–2	3–1	3–2
Pahang (A)	6	3	1	2	12	7	+5	10	2–3		1–2	4–0
(Singapore) LionsXII	6	1	2	3	7	10	−3	5	0–0	1–2		2–2
Johor DT II	6	1	2	3	8	14	−6	5	1–3	1–1	2–1	

(A) Advanced to the 2014 Piala Malaysia quarter finals

=== Group B ===
Team	Pld	W	D	L	GF	GA	GD	Pts	(Kedah) KED	(Terengganu) TER	(Perak) PRK	(Sarawak) SAR
Kedah (A)	6	3	1	2	11	9	+2	10		2–3	2–0	2–1
Terengganu (A)	6	2	3	1	10	9	+1	9	2–2		2–1	0–0
Perak	6	2	2	2	7	7	0	8	2–1	1–1		2–0
Sarawak	6	1	2	3	6	9	−3	5	1–2	3–2	1–1	

(A) Advanced to the 2014 Piala Malaysia quarter finals

=== Group C ===
Team	Pld	W	D	L	GF	GA	GD	Pts	(Johor) JDT	(Kelantan) KEL	ATM	(Penang) PEN
Johor DT (A)	6	5	1	0	13	1	+12	16		1–0	0–0	5–0
Kelantan (A)	6	3	0	3	10	8	+2	9	0–3		1–2	3–1
ATM	6	1	2	3	4	8	−4	5	0–1	0–3		1–1
Penang	6	1	1	4	6	16	−10	4	1–3	1–3	2–1	

(A) Advanced to the 2014 Piala Malaysia quarter finals

=== Group D ===
Team	Pld	W	D	L	GF	GA	GD	Pts	(Malaysia) PDRM	(Selangor) SEL	(Kuala Lumpur) SDA	(Terengganu) TTM
(Malaysia) PDRM (A)	6	5	1	0	15	4	+11	16		1–1	3–1	4–1
Selangor (A)	6	3	1	2	7	6	+1	10	0–2		1–2	1–0
(Kuala Lumpur) Sime Darby	6	2	0	4	6	12	−6	6	0–3	0–2		2–1
(Terengganu) T-Team	6	1	0	5	6	12	−6	3	1–2	1–2	2–1	

(A) Advanced to the 2014 Piala Malaysia quarter finals

== Knockout stage ==
=== Bracket ===
Quarter-finals
A1	(Kuala Lumpur) Felda United	4	3	7
D2	Selangor	0	3	3
C1	Johor Darul Takzim	0	3	3
B2	Terengganu	0	1	1
B1	Kedah	1	3	4
C2	Kelantan	3	0	3
D1	(Malaysia) PDRM	1	1	2
A2	Pahang	1	2	3

Semi-finals
(Kuala Lumpur) Felda United	4	1	5
Johor Darul Takzim	3	3	6
Kedah	3	0	3
Pahang	1	5	6

Final
Johor Darul Takzim	2
Pahang	2

== Quarterfinals ==
The first legs were played on 3 September 2014, and the second legs were played on 10 & 11 October 2014.

Team 1	Agg.	Team 2	1st leg	2nd leg
Kelantan	3–4	Kedah	3–1	0–3
Selangor	3–7	(Kuala Lumpur) Felda United	0–4	3–3
Terengganu	1–3	Johor Darul Takzim	0–0	1–3
Pahang	3–2	(Malaysia) PDRM	1–1	2–1

=== First leg ===
3 October 2014
20:45 UTC+8

Kelantan	3 – 1	Kedah
Doe 7', 24'; Fakri 61'		Syafiq 71'

Sultan Muhammad IV Stadium, Kota Bharu, Kelantan

3 October 2014
20:45 UTC+8

Selangor	0 – 4	(Kuala Lumpur) Felda United
		Makeche 22', 84', 86'; E.J. Wilson 45'

Shah Alam Stadium, Shah Alam, Selangor

3 October 2014
20:45 UTC+8

Terengganu	0 – 0	Johor Darul Takzim

Sultan Ismail Nasiruddin Shah Stadium, Kuala Terengganu, Terengganu

3 October 2014
20:45 UTC+8

Pahang	1 – 1	(Malaysia) PDRM
Nwakaeme 56'		Fauzi 42'

Darul Makmur Stadium, Kuantan, Pahang

=== Second leg ===
10 October 2013
20:45 UTC+8

Kedah	3 – 0	Kelantan
Hanif 42'; Baddrol 52'; Syafiq 89'

Darul Aman Stadium, Alor Setar, Kedah

Kedah won 4–3 on aggregate.

10 October 2014
20:45 UTC+8

Felda United (Kuala Lumpur)	3 – 3	Selangor
E.J. Wilson 48', 69'; Indra 87'		Rangel 33', 62'; Andik 51'

Temerloh Mini Stadium, Temerloh, Pahang

(Kuala Lumpur) Felda United won 7–3 on aggregate.

16 October 2014
20:45 UTC+8

Johor Darul Takzim	3 – 1	Terengganu
Safiq 15', 74'; Figueroa 22'		Ashaari 60'

Tan Sri Dato Hj Hassan Yunos Stadium, Larkin, Johor
Referee: Nagor Amir Nor Mohamad

Johor Darul Takzim won 3–1 on aggregate.

11 October 2014
20:45 UTC+8

PDRM (Malaysia)	1 – 2	Pahang
Fauzi 18'		Zesh 77'; Fauzi 90+1'

Shah Alam Stadium, Shah Alam

Pahang won 3–2 on aggregate.

== Semi finals ==
The first legs were played on 19 & 20 October 2014, and the second legs were played on 24 & 25 October 2014.

Team 1	Agg.	Team 2	1st leg	2nd leg
Kedah	3–6	Pahang	3–1	0–5
Felda United (Kuala Lumpur)	5–6	Johor Darul Takzim	4–3	1–3

=== First leg ===
19 October 2014
20:45 UTC+8

Kedah	3 – 1	Pahang
Namkung 9'; Farhan 49'; Khyril 90+4'		Conti 90+1'

Darul Aman Stadium, Alor Setar, Kedah

20 October 2014
20:45 UTC+8

Felda United (Kuala Lumpur)	4 – 3	Johor Darul Takzim F.C.
E.J. Wilson 7'; Syamim 43'; Makeche 61', 90+3'		Díaz 52', 89'; Figueroa 79'

Majlis Perbandaran Selayang Stadium, Selayang, Selangor
Referee: Samsudin Ibrahim

=== Second leg ===
24 October 2014
20:45 UTC+8

Pahang	5 – 0	Kedah
Conti 4', 29', 36'; Gopinathan 26', 73'

Darul Makmur Stadium, Kuantan, Pahang

Pahang won 6–3 on aggregate.

25 October 2014
20:45 UTC+8

Johor Darul Takzim	3 – 1	(Kuala Lumpur) Felda United
Figueroa 29', 64'; Amri 72'		Raimi 35'

Tan Sri Dato Haji Hassan Yunos Stadium, Johor Bahru, Johor

Johor Darul Takzim won 6–5 on aggregate.

== Final ==
The final match was played on 1 November 2014

1 November 2014
20:45 UTC+8

Johor Darul Takzim	2 – 2	Pahang
Diaz 31'; Figueroa 34'		Nwakaeme 15', 71'
Penalties
Figueroa (penalty scored); Diaz (penalty scored); Hariss (penalty scored); Norshahrul (penalty missed)	3–5	(penalty scored) Roslan; (penalty scored) Stewart; (penalty scored) Shahrizan; (penalty scored) Rehman; (penalty scored) Hafiz

Bukit Jalil National Stadium, Bukit Jalil, Kuala Lumpur
Attendance: 90,000
Referee: Nagor Amir Nor Mohamad

== Winners ==
2014 Piala Malaysia winner
(Pahang)
Pahang
4th title
