= Mahalli Jasuli =

Malaysian footballer (born 2 April 1989)

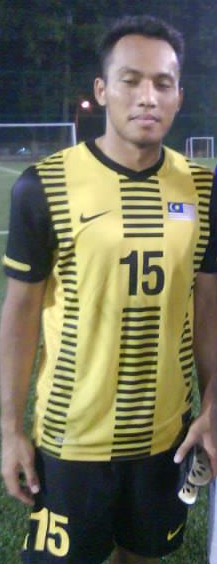
- Mahalli with Malaysia Olympic Team in 2011

Personal information
- Full name: Mahalli bin Jasuli
- Date of birth: 2 April 1989 (age 37)
- Place of birth: Selayang, Selangor, Malaysia
- Height: 1.75 m (5 ft 9 in)
- Positions: Forward; right back

Team information
- Current team: Melaka
- Number: 89

Youth career
- 2002–2008: Bukit Jalil Sports School

Senior career*
Years	Team	Apps	(Gls)
2007–2009	Harimau Muda	18	(3)
2009–2012	Harimau Muda A	42	(6)
2013	Selangor	22	(1)
2014–2019	Johor Darul Ta'zim	44	(3)
2018–2019	→ PKNS (loan)	26	(2)
2020–2022	Petaling Jaya City FC	26	(1)
2023–2024	Negeri Sembilan	21	(1)
2024	Kuala Lumpur City	8	(0)
2025	Kuala Lumpur Rangers	3	(0)
2025–	Melaka	1	(0)

International career^{‡}
2008–2009	Malaysia U19	18	(2)
2009–2011	Malaysia U21	21	(3)
2009–2012	Malaysia U23	16	(1)
2009–2018	Malaysia	52	(3)
Medal record
Malaysia U23
Sea Games
Gold medal – first place	Sea Games 2009	Football
Gold medal – first place	Sea Games 2011	Football
Malaysia
Asean Football Championship
Winner	AFF Suzuki Cup 2010	2010
Runner-up	AFF Suzuki Cup 2014	2014
- * Club domestic league appearances and goals as of 16:38, May 15, 2024 (UTC) ‡ National team caps and goals as of October 16, 2018

Mahalli bin Jasuli (born 2 April 1989) is a Malaysian footballer who plays as a forward for Malaysia Super League club Melaka. He also can play as a right-back and winger.

== Club career ==
Mahalli captained Harimau Muda A (Malaysian Under-23) when the team participated in the 2012 S. League. Mahalli helped Harimau Muda A to finish in 4th place.

For the 2013 season, Mahalli officially signed for Selangor. His first goal for Selangor came on 9 March 2013 in a 4–1 defeat of Johor Darul Ta'zim.

=== Johor Darul Ta'zim ===
Mahalli made his debut for Johor Darul Ta'zim in a 2–0 win over Perak on 18 January 2014.

=== PKNS ===
On 26 January 2018, Mahalli agreed to join PKNS on a season-long loan move from Johor Darul Ta'zim.

=== Negeri Sembilan ===
Mahalli was officially announced as a new Negeri Sembilan FC player on 12 January 2023.

== International career ==
Mahalli played as a fullback for the Malaysian national football team. In 2009, he played twice against Manchester United during their preseason tour of the Far East.

In November 2010, Mahalli was called up to the Malaysia national squad by coach K. Rajagopal for the 2010 AFF Suzuki Cup. The young right-back scored his first international goal in that tournament against Laos during the final group game and subsequently went on to help Malaysia win the 2010 AFF Suzuki Cup title for the first time in their history.

Mahalli was called up for the 2012 AFF Suzuki Cup, scoring against Indonesia in the group stage. Malaysia reached the semi-finals, where they lost to Thailand.

== Personal life ==
His grandmother from Gresik, East Java, Indonesia. In August 2015, Mahalli tied the knot with his fiancée during mid of eid' fitri weeks.

An alumnus of Bukit Jalil National Sports School, he is graduated from University of Putra, Malaysia in Human Resource Development.

== Career statistics ==
=== Club ===
As of 28 July 2018.

Appearances and goals by club, season and competition
Club	Season	League			Cup		League Cup		Continental		Total	
Club	Season	Division	Apps	Goals	Apps	Goals	Apps	Goals	Apps	Goals	Apps	Goals
Selangor	2013	Malaysia Super League	22	1	0	2	0	0	6	0	0	3
Selangor	Total		22	1	0	2	0	0	6	0	0	3
Johor Darul Ta'zim	2014	Malaysia Super League	19	2	5	0	0	0	–		0	2
Johor Darul Ta'zim	2015	Malaysia Super League	14	1	1	0	8	1	11	1	34	3
Johor Darul Ta'zim	2016	Malaysia Super League	4	0	0	0	0	0	7	1	0	1
Johor Darul Ta'zim	2017	Malaysia Super League	7	0	3	0	0	0	6	1	16	1
Johor Darul Ta'zim	Total		44	3	9	0	0	1	24	3	0	7
PKNS (loan)	2018	Malaysia Super League	15	2	5	1	0	0	–		20	3
PKNS (loan)	Total		15	2	5	1	0	0	–		20	3
Career Total			0	0	0	0	0	0	–	–	0	0

=== International ===
As of 16 October 2018

Malaysia national team
Year	Apps	Goals
2009	5	0
2010	5	1
2011	5	0
2012	13	1
2013	5	0
2014	10	0
2015	1	0
2016	1	0
2017	1	1
2018	6	0
Total	52	3

==== International goals ====
Scores and results list Malaysia's goal tally first.

No.	Date	Venue	Opponent	Score	Result	Competition
Under-23
1.	27 November 2011	Bukit Jalil, Malaysia	Bahrain	2–0	2–3	2012 Summer Olympics qualification
Senior
1.	7 December 2010	Gelora Sriwijaya Stadium, Palembang, Indonesia	Laos	5–1	5–1	2010 AFF Championship
2.	1 December 2012	Bukit Jalil National Stadium, Bukit Jalil, Malaysia	Indonesia	2–0	2–0	2012 AFF Championship
3.	13 June 2017	Tan Sri Dato' Haji Hassan Yunos Stadium, Johor Bahru, Malaysia	Lebanon	1–0	1–2	2019 AFC Asian Cup qualification

=== Malaysia XI ===
No.	Date	Location	Head coach	Opponent	Result	Goals
1	18 July 2009	National Stadium, Bukit Jalil	K. Rajagopal	Manchester United	2–3 (L)	
2	20 July 2009	National Stadium, Bukit Jalil	K. Rajagopal	Manchester United	0–2 (L)	
3	13 July 2011	National Stadium, Bukit Jalil	K. Rajagopal	Arsenal	0–4 (L)	
4	16 July 2011	National Stadium, Bukit Jalil	K. Rajagopal	liverpool	3–6 (L)	
5	21 July 2011	National Stadium, Bukit Jalil	Ong Kim Swee	Chelsea	0–1 (L)	
6	24 July 2012	National Stadium, Bukit Jalil	K. Rajagopal	Arsenal	1–2 (L)	
7	30 July 2012	National Stadium, Bukit Jalil	K. Rajagopal	Manchester City	1–3 (L)	

== Honours ==
=== Club ===
Harimau Muda

- Malaysia Premier League : 2009

Johor Darul Ta'zim

- Malaysian Charity Shield (2): 2015, 2016
- Malaysia Super League (5): 2014, 2015, 2016, 2017, 2018
- Malaysia Cup : 2017
- AFC Cup : 2015
- Malaysia FA Cup : 2016

=== International ===
Malaysia U-20

- AFF U-20 Youth Championship : 2007 runner-up

Malaysia

- AFF Championship : 2010 winner
- AFF Championship : 2014 runner-up
- SEA Games (2) : 2009, 2011

=== Individual ===
- Goal.com Asian Best XI for November 2012
- ASEAN All-Stars: 2014
