= Mohd Shahrizan Salleh =

Malaysian footballer

Shahrizan Salleh
Personal information
- Full name: Mohd Shahrizan bin Mohd Salleh
- Date of birth: 16 January 1982 (age 44)
- Place of birth: Pahang, Malaysia
- Height: 1.72 m (5 ft 7 1/2 in)
- Position: Defender

Team information
- Current team: Shahzan Muda FC
- Number: 3

Youth career
- 1998–2000: Pahang President Cup team

Senior career*
Years	Team	Apps	(Gls)
2000–2004	Pahang FA		
2005–2006	Shahzan Muda FC		
2007–2016	Pahang FA	128	(20)
2017–	Shahzan Muda FC	0	(0)
- * Club domestic league appearances and goals as of January 03, 2016 ‡ National team caps and goals as of January 03, 2016

Shahrizan Salleh is a Malaysian footballer who is a defender for Shahzan Muda FC. He was member of Pahang FA when they won the first Malaysian Super League 2004.

== Honours ==
=== Club ===
- Malaysia Cup:
  - Winners (2): 2013, 2014
- FA Cup:
  - Winners (1): 2014
- Malaysia Charity Shield Cup:
  - Winners (1): 2014
