= 2015 Piala Sumbangsih =

Johor Darul Ta'zim	Pahang
2	0
- Date: 31 January 2015
- Venue: Tan Sri Dato Haji Hassan Yunos Stadium, Johor Bahru
- Man of the Match: Luciano Figueroa (Johor Darul Ta'zim F.C.)
- Attendance: 25,000

The 2015 Piala Sumbangsih was the 30th edition of the Piala Sumbangsih, an annual football match played between the winners of the previous season's Malaysia Super League and Malaysia Cup. The game was played between Pahang, winners of the 2014 Malaysia Cup, and Johor Darul Ta'zim, champions of the 2014 Malaysia Super League. Watched by a crowd of 25,000 at Tan Sri Dato Haji Hassan Yunos Stadium, Johor Darul Ta'zim won the match 2–0.

== Match details ==
31 January 2015
20:45 PDT

Johor Darul Ta'zim	2–0	Pahang
Marcos António Elias Santos 36'; Luciano Figueroa 58'

Tan Sri Dato Haji Hassan Yunos Stadium, Johor Bahru, Johor Darul Takzim
Attendance: 25,000

Johor Darul Takzim FC	Pahang

== Winners ==
2015 Piala Sumbangsih

Johor Darul Ta'zim
First title
