= Dickson Nwakaeme =

Nigerian footballer (born 1986)

Personal information
- Full name: Dickson Nwakaeme Kabu
- Date of birth: 21 April 1986 (age 40)
- Place of birth: Lagos, Nigeria
- Height: 1.84 m (6 ft 0 in)
- Position: Forward

Senior career*
Years	Team	Apps	(Gls)
2008	Halmstad	14	(8)
2009–2010	KuPS	27	(9)
2010	Aalborg BK	7	(1)
2011	KuPS	20	(7)
2012	SLNA	13	(10)
2013	Kelantan	11	(5)
2014–2015	Pahang FA	39	(14)
2016–2017	Angers	6	(0)
2016–2017	Angers II	7	(1)
2019–2020	Pahang FA	20	(9)
2021–2022	Daejeon Korail FC	33	(12)
Total		197	(76)
- * Club domestic league appearances and goals

Dickson Nwakaeme Kabu (born 21 April 1986) is a Nigerian former professional footballer who played as a forward.

== Career ==
=== Halmstad ===
Nwakaeme professional debut is for Swedish first division Halmstad from 2008 to 2009. The "journeyman" forward played a huge role in destroying the defence and later on offered to a move to KuPS the end of the 2008–09 season.

=== KuPS ===
Nwakaeme played for the Finnish premier division team KuPS from 2009 to 2010. He made a big impact in his first match with KuPS, helping his team to a 3–0 victory over rivals RoPS. He scored a goal and was voted player of the match at Magnum Areena. After KuPS' defeat of Inter Turku, Inter Turku manager Job Dragtsma claimed that Nwakaeme was the best striker he had ever seen in the Veikkausliiga.

=== Aalborg BK ===
Nwakaeme was loaned from Oulun Pallo to Aalborg BK from 1 September 2010 to 31 December 2010. He played seven matches and scored one goal.

=== SLNA ===
In April 2012, Nwakaeme signed a five-month contract with V.League 1 champions SLNA. He scored on his debut for SLNA, coming off the bench in the second half to score a 93rd-minute equalizer against Sai Gon Xuan Thanh in the 14th round of matches in the league. The game ended 2–2 and preserved SLNA's unbeaten start to the league. Nwakaeme refused to extend his contract with SLNA.

=== Kelantan ===
In February 2013, Nwakaeme went on trial with Malaysia Super League team Kelantan. After two weeks of trialling, he signed a one-year contract with the club. He made his debut playing against Maziya Sports & Recreation Club at Sultan Muhammad IV Stadium in Kota Bharu during the 2013 AFC Cup campaign. On 13 April, in the club's fourth match of the AFC Cup his lone goal led Kelantan to an AFC Cup win over SHB Đà Nẵng.

=== Pahang FA ===
In December 2013, Nwakaeme signed for Pahang FA together with Damion Stewart and Zeshan Rehman who had played for Fulham and Queens Park Rangers (QPR) respectively. On 8 March 2014, he scored his first score goal for Pahang FA after scoring twice against ATM FA and helping Pahang win the match. On 7 June 2014, he scored the winning goal against Felda United at the 2014 Malaysia FA Cup at Shah Alam Stadium. The goal brought the FA Cup to Kuantan after eight years of waiting. In 2014 Malaysia Cup, he scored two goals against JDT FC. The match brought the Malaysia Cup to Pahang, winning 5–3 on penalties after a draw in extra time.

=== Angers ===
In 2016, he signed for Ligue 1 club Angers, having been released by Pahang earlier in the year. His debut for his new club on 24 September that year was memorable, as a substitute, he scored an own goal in a 2–1 defeat to Monaco in the league. Nwakaeme scored his first goal for Angers in a Coupe de France match against US Granville in January 2017, scoring the winner in a 2–1 result.

Nwakaeme was released by Angers in June 2017 after only one season.

=== Return to Pahang ===
In January 2019, Nwakaeme rejoined Pahang FA. In the opening game of the 2019 Malaysia Super League, he scored twice in a 3–1 win over Kuala Lumpur FA.

=== Daejeon Korail ===
Nwakaeme signed for Daejeon Korail FC after one season with Pahang FA. He made his debut for Daejeon Korail, helping the club 8–6 win against Pyeongtaek Citizen FC.

== Personal life ==
Dickson Nwakaeme is the older brother of Anthony Nwakaeme.

== Honours ==
Kelantan

- FA Cup: 2013
- Malaysia Cup runner-up: 2013

Pahang

- FA Cup: 2014
- Malaysia Cup: 2014
- Malaysia Charity Shield runner-up: 2015
