= Luciano Figueroa =

Argentine former professional footballer

Personal information
- Full name: Luciano Gabriel Figueroa Herrera
- Date of birth: 19 May 1981 (age 45)
- Place of birth: Santa Fe, Argentina
- Height: 1.83 m (6 ft 0 in)
- Position: Striker

Senior career*
| Years | Team | Apps | (Gls) |
| 2001–2003 | Rosario Central | 57 | (35) |
| 2003 | Birmingham City | 1 | (0) |
| 2004 | Cruz Azul | 33 | (21) |
| 2004–2006 | Villarreal | 26 | (5) |
| 2006 | River Plate | 7 | (3) |
| 2006–2010 | Genoa | 23 | (3) |
| 2008–2009 | → Boca Juniors (loan) | 17 | (7) |
| 2010–2012 | Rosario Central | 38 | (12) |
| 2012–2013 | Emelec | 34 | (14) |
| 2013 | Panathinaikos | 15 | (6) |
| 2014–2015 | Johor Darul Ta'zim | 36 | (23) |
| 2018 | Johor Darul Ta'zim | 4 | (2) |
| Total | | 291 | (131) |

International career^{‡}
| 2004–2005 | Argentina | 15 | (9) |

Managerial career
- 2018–2020: Johor Darul Ta'zim
Medal record
Representing Argentina
Men's Football
| Gold medal – first place | 2004 Athens | Team competition |
- * Club domestic league appearances and goals as of 1 December 2015 ‡ National team caps and goals as of 14 October 2014

Luciano Gabriel "Lucho" Figueroa Herrera (Spanish pronunciation: [luˈsjano fiɣeˈɾoa]; born 19 May 1981) is an Argentine former professional footballer who played as a striker.

== Club career ==
Figueroa was born in Santa Fe. He began his professional career with Primera División club Rosario Central, where he formed a partnership with César Delgado. In the 2003 Clausura, Figueroa finished as Argentina's leading goalscorer with 17 goals, which included five in the last match of the season against an under-strength Boca Juniors. This was his last season at Rosario Central. Both he and Delgado transferred overseas in the summer of 2003; Figueroa joined English Premier League club Birmingham City for a fee of £2.5 million.

Controversy arose when Spanish club Osasuna claimed that Figueroa had signed a contract with them before his move to Birmingham, thereby invalidating the transfer. At the end of August 2003 FIFA ruled provisionally in Birmingham's favour, but it was not until October that this ruling was finally confirmed. Figueroa had been close to joining Rangers earlier that summer but the Glasgow club pulled out of the deal.

Though Figueroa was scoring freely for Birmingham's reserve team, manager Steve Bruce believed he would struggle in the Premiership due to his physique. After only one League appearance, as a late substitute in a 2–0 defeat of Portsmouth, and one outing in the League Cup, his contract was annulled, and he signed for Cruz Azul of the Primera División de México, where he was reunited with former teammate Delgado.

After a slow start, Figueroa returned to his old form with Cruz Azul, scoring 9 goals in the last 7 games of the 2004 Clausura. He maintained his form in the 2004 Apertura, scoring 10 goals in 14 games for the club.

=== Villarreal ===
His exceptional performances for Cruz Azul led to a transfer to Spain, where he signed a five-and-a-half-year contract with Villarreal in November 2004. The transfer fee was officially undisclosed, but was estimated in the media as €3 million.

Figueroa made less of an impact at Villarreal. Even so, he helped the club to a third-place finish in La Liga in the 2004–05 season, and scored their first ever Champions League goal, against Everton in the third qualifying round of the 2005–06 competition, but had left the club by the time they reached the semi-final.

In January 2006, apparently concerned that his lack of playing time would adversely affect his chances of selection for Argentina at the 2006 World Cup, Figueroa returned to his home country. He joined River Plate, who bought 50% of the rights to the player. He started well there, scoring three goals in his first seven games of the 2006 Clausura, but on 5 March 2006 he suffered a cruciate ligament injury which effectively put an end to his career with River.

=== Genoa ===
On 1 August 2006, Villarreal sold Figueroa to Genoa of Serie B for a reported $13 million fee. He signed a four-year contract with the club. Though still not fully recovered from his injury, medical opinion was that Figueroa should have been able to play again by mid-October. However it became clear that the knee reconstruction had not been completely successful and that another operation would be needed. It was predicted that this further surgery would keep him from playing that season.

Figueroa eventually made his debut for Genoa, by this time in Serie A, on 28 October 2007 as a second-half substitute against Fiorentina, and scored his first goal for the club some six weeks later, a stoppage-time consolation in a 3–1 defeat at home to Siena.

Figueroa was loaned from Genoa to Boca Juniors in October 2008. He played an important role during the Torneo Apertura by scoring important goals as the title race was between Boca Juniors, Tigre and San Lorenzo, who were level on points at the top of the table. Eventually, Figueroa's performances helped Boca to win the Torneo Apertura.

=== Rosario Central ===
After Genoa released the player, he returned to his first club, Rosario Central. After passing a medical examination on his knee, he signed a two-and-a-half-year contract on 20 January 2010.

=== Panathinaikos ===
On 6 February 2013, he was released on a free transfer by Emelec and joined Greek club Panathinaikos until the end of the season. He made his debut in a crucial game against AEK Athens that Panathinaikos won 2–0. On 9 March 2013 he scored his first goal for the Greens, with a successful penalty kick against AO Kerkyra. He scored a goal in an away match against Olympiacos in a match that ended 1–1.

It was reported in June 2013 that Figueroa was to sign for Brazilian Série A side Náutico, but the deal fell through.

On 12 September 2013, Figueroa signed once again with Panathinaikos for one year.

=== Johor Darul Ta'zim ===
Figueroa signed a three-year contract, reportedly worth $1.5 million annually, with Malaysia Super League team Johor Darul Ta'zim in December 2013. The transfer fee was $1 million. Figueroa scored his first goal in the 88th minute after a through pass from Safiq Rahim to give Johor Darul Ta'zim their first win, 2–0 against Perak FA in the season opener. His previous experiences with clubs in Europe and South America helped Johor Darul Ta'zim to win their first league title in the 2014 season with 11 league goals (22 goals overall).

On 22 August 2015, he won his second league title with Johor. On 31 October 2015, Figueroa won the club's first ever AFC Cup title after defeating Istiklol 1–0 in the final.

After his playing contract with Johor Darul Ta'zim ended in 2015, Figueroa decided to retire as a football player. In 2017, he returned to become the new Johor Darul Ta'zim football club ambassador, and came out of retirement in November of that year to play for Johor Darul Ta'zim in the 2018 Malaysia Super League. In May 2018, he returned to his ambassadorial role and retired again as a professional football player. In August 2018, Figueroa was appointed as the team manager of Johor Darul Ta'zim. Club owner Tunku Ismail Ibrahim later also announced Figueroa as head coach of JDT, with JDT II head coach Benjamin Mora as his assistant.

== International career ==
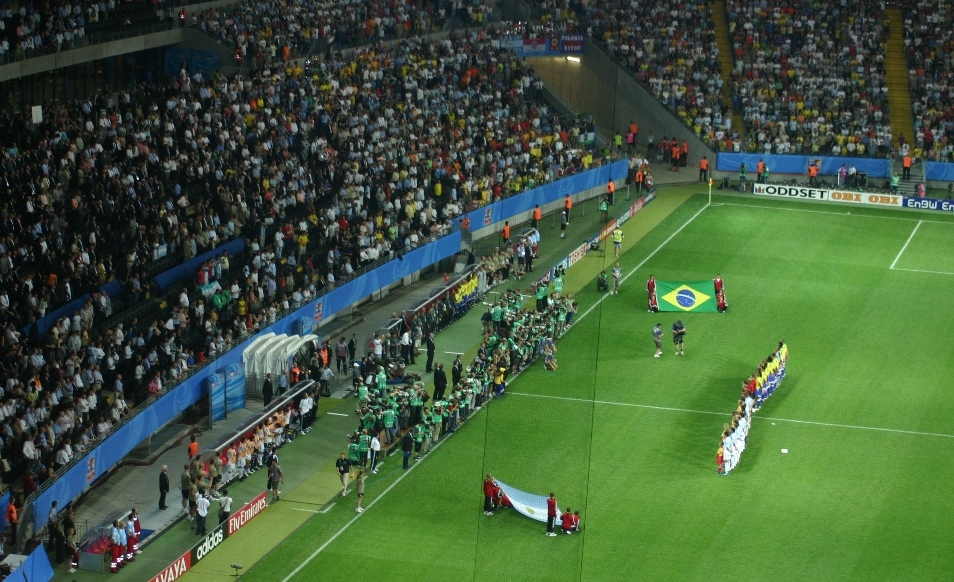
2005 FIFA Confederations Cup Final

Figueroa has appeared for the Argentina national football team while playing for Cruz Azul and Villarreal, performing impressively in the Copa América 2004 and the 2005 Confederations Cup – where only the Brazilian Adriano outscored him – and was part of the gold medal-winning Argentina team at the 2004 Summer Olympics. At international level, he boasts a strike-rate of 60%, with 9 goals from 15 appearances, the same stats as Martín Palermo. The cruciate injury deprived him of the chance to represent his country at the 2006 World Cup.

== Career statistics ==
=== International ===
Appearances and goals by national team and year
| National team | Year | Apps | Goals |
|---|---|---|---|
| Argentina | 2004 | 9 | 4 |
| Argentina | 2005 | 6 | 5 |
| Argentina | Total | 15 | 9 |

List of international goals scored by Luciano Figueroa
| No. | Date | Venue | Opponent | Score | Result | Competition | Ref. |
|---|---|---|---|---|---|---|---|
| 1. | 13 July 2004 | Estadio Miguel Grau, Piura, Peru | Uruguay | 2–1 | 4–2 | 2004 Copa América | |
| 2. | 13 July 2004 | Estadio Miguel Grau, Piura, Peru | Uruguay | 4–2 | 4–2 | 2004 Copa América | |
| 3. | 10 September 2004 | El Monumental, Buenos Aires, Argentina | Uruguay | 2–0 | 4–2 | 2006 FIFA World Cup qualification | |
| 4. | 10 September 2004 | El Monumental, Buenos Aires, Argentina | Uruguay | 4–0 | 4–2 | 2006 FIFA World Cup qualification | |
| 5. | 26 March 2005 | Estadio Hernando Siles, La Paz, Bolivia | Bolivia | 1–1 | 2–1 | 2006 FIFA World Cup qualification | |
| 6. | 18 June 2005 | Frankenstadion, Nuremberg, Germany | Australia | 1–0 | 4–2 | 2005 Confederations Cup | |
| 7. | 18 June 2005 | Frankenstadion, Nuremberg, Germany | Australia | 3–0 | 4–2 | 2005 Confederations Cup | |
| 8. | 18 June 2005 | Frankenstadion, Nuremberg, Germany | Australia | 4–2 | 4–2 | 2005 Confederations Cup | |
| 9. | 26 June 2005 | FIFA World Cup Stadium, Hanover, Germany | Mexico | 1–1 | 1–1 (7–6 pen.) | 2005 Confederations Cup | |

== Honours ==
=== Player ===
Boca Juniors

- Primera División: 2008 Apertura

Johor Darul Ta'zim

- Malaysia Super League: 2014, 2015, 2018
- Malaysia Cup: runner-up 2014
- Piala Sumbangsih: 2015, 2018
- AFC Cup: 2015

Argentina

- Olympic Gold Medal: 2004
- CONMEBOL Pre-Olympic Tournament: 2004
- Copa América: runner-up 2004
- FIFA Confederations Cup: runner-up 2005

==== Individual ====
- Primera División Argentina top scorer: 2003 Clausura
- PFAM Player of the Month: July 2015
- FAM Football Awards Best Foreign Player: 2015

=== Manager ===
Johor Darul Ta'zim

- Malaysia Super League: 2019, 2020
- Malaysia Cup: 2019
- Piala Sumbangsih: 2019, 2020
