= Jorge Pereyra Díaz =

Argentine footballer (born 1990)

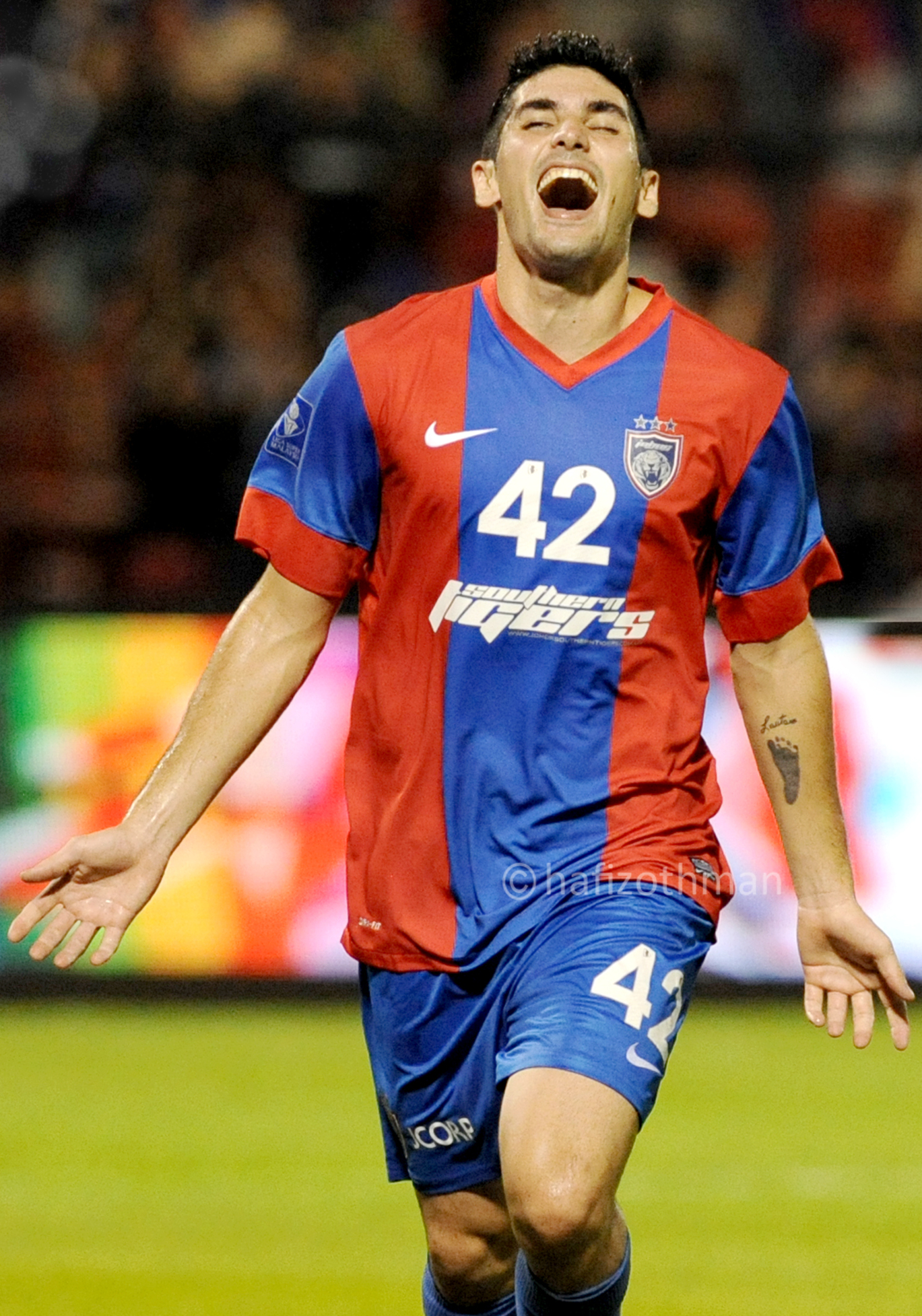
- Pereyra Díaz with Johor Darul Ta'zim in 2014

Personal information
- Full name: Jorge Rolando Pereyra Díaz
- Date of birth: 5 August 1990 (age 36)
- Place of birth: La Rioja, Argentina
- Height: 1.78 m (5 ft 10 in)
- Position: Striker

Youth career
- Ferro

Senior career*
Years	Team	Apps	(Gls)
2008–2012	Ferro	86	(15)
2013–2014	Lanús	31	(5)
2014–2018	Johor Darul Ta'zim	49	(28)
2015	→ Independiente (loan)	6	(0)
2017–2018	→ León (loan)	13	(1)
2018	Lanús	11	(0)
2019–2020	Bolívar	41	(19)
2020–2021	San Marcos	7	(2)
2021–2022	Platense	12	(2)
2021–2022	→ Kerala Blasters (loan)	21	(8)
2022–2024	Mumbai City	37	(21)
2024–2025	Bengaluru	18	(3)
2025–2026	Mumbai City	7	(1)
2026–	Samaleswari	1	(1)
- * Club domestic league appearances and goals as of 10:00, 7 September 2026 (UTC)

Jorge Rolando Pereyra Díaz (born 5 August 1990) is an Argentine professional footballer who plays as a forward for the Indian Football League club Samaleswari.

== Club career ==
=== Ferro Carril Oeste ===
Pereyra Díaz began his professional career with Primera B Nacional club Ferro Carril Oeste.

=== Lanus ===
On 6 March 2013, he signed with Lanús. He made his debut with 'Granate' on 13 April 2013, as a substitute, in a league match where Lanus beat All Boys 2–1. Pereyra Díaz' first start came a few days later, on April 17, in a Copa Argentina match against Atlético Rafaela. With Lanús, he helped them win the 2013 Copa Sudamericana, being in the starting lineup in the first leg final against Ponte Preta.

=== Johor Darul Ta'zim ===
==== 2014 ====
Pereyra Díaz signed a three-year contract with Malaysia Super League team Johor Darul Ta'zim in May 2014. The transfer fee was rumoured to be US$2 million. He made his debut as a substitute in the first leg of the Malaysia FA Cup semi final against Pahang FA. On 20 May 2014, he scored a brace to help Johor Darul Takzim came back from 0–2 down to win 3–2 against LionsXII at Stadium Jalan Besar. He finished the season with 15 goals in 29 league appearances.

==== 2015 ====
During the 2015 season, he scored two goals against Ayeyawady United in a 5–0 victory during the AFC Cup. On 12 July 2015, Pereyra Díaz was loaned out to Independiente.

==== Independiente (loan) ====
Pereyra Díaz only made seven league appearances for Independiente. After his four months loan spell, he returned to JDT.

==== 2016 ====
After his loan spell with Independiente, Pereyra Díaz returned to JDT for the 2016 Malaysia Super League season. On 2 February 2016, he made his 2016 debut during the 2016 AFC Champions League qualifying play-off against Muangthong United, where JDT were defeated 0–3 on penalties with Diaz missing the first penalty. He made his 2016 Malaysia Super League debut in a 1–1 draw against Selangor FA, where JDT lifted their third Sultan Haji Ahmad Shah Cup after winning on penalties (7–6 p). On 16 February 2016, Pereyra Díaz scored his first Malaysia Super League goal of the season in a 2–0 victory against T-Team F.C. He also contributed a goal and 2 assist during JDT's 8–1 victory against Ayeyawady United in the 2016 AFC Cup group stage.

==== Club León (loan) ====
On 21 January 2017, Jorge Pereyra Díaz joined Liga MX club Club León on loan from JDT. Pereyra Díaz made his debut for the club against Atlas F.C. coming on as substitute in the 59th minute for Germán Cano. On 13 August 2017, Pereyra Díaz scored his first goal for the club against Club Necaxa.

==== 2018 ====
Pereyra Díaz returned to JDT after his loan spell with León. On 3 February 2018, Pereyra Díaz made his 2018 Malaysia Super League debut in a 2–1 victory against Kedah Darul Aman FC. On 6 February 2018, Pereyra Díaz scored his first goal of the 2018 season against Perak FA II. On 9 May 2018, Pereyra Díaz terminated his contract with JDT.

=== Return to Lanus ===
On 23 May 2018, Pereyra Díaz returned to his former club Atlético Lanús for the 2018–19 Argentine Primera División.

=== Bolívar ===
On 30 December 2018, Pereyra Díaz joined Bolivian Primera División club Bolívar. He scored 19 goals in the 2019 Bolivian Primera División and won the Torneo Apertura title.

=== San Marcos ===
On 26 November 2020, Pereyra Díaz signed for Chilean club San Marcos for the 2020 Primera B de Chile season.

=== Platense ===
On 11 February 2021, Pereyra Díaz signed for Argentine Primera División club Platense.

==== Kerala Blasters (loan) ====
On 27 August 2021, Pereyra Díaz joined Indian Super League side Kerala Blasters on a season-long loan. He made his debut on 19 November in the 2021–22 season opener against ATK Mohun Bagan FC, where he scored his debut goal but the Blasters suffered a 4–2 defeat at full-time. He scored again in the match against defending champions Mumbai City FC on 19 December, where he netted a penalty in the 51st minute as Kerala Blasters won the game 3–0 away from home. Díaz scored again in the next match against rivals Chennaiyin FC on 22 December, where he scored the opening goal of the game as the Blasters won the game with a score of 0–3. He scored his fourth goal of the season against NorthEast United FC on 4 February 2022, where he netted the opening goal of the game as Kerala Blasters won the match 2–1 at full-time. After the Blasters' match against ATK Mohun Bagan on 23 February, Díaz was shown a direct red card after being substituted. He was the charged by the All India Football Federation Disciplinary Committee for ‘violent conduct’. He was indicted for violating Article 48.1.2 of the AIFF Disciplinary Code mentioning that he 'broke the dugout panel, an act of violent conduct'. He was then given a one-game ban. Díaz was back after the one-match ban on 26 February to play against Chennaiyin, where he netted a brace as Kerala Blasters won the match 3–0 at full-time. In the Blasters' match against FC Goa on 6 March, Díaz scored another brace, which initially gave the Blasters the lead, but the match ended in a high-scoring 4–4 draw.

=== Mumbai City ===
==== 2022-23 season ====
In August 2022, Mumbai City completed the signing of Pereyra Díaz, on a one-year deal. On 18 August, he made his debut for the club against Indian Navy in the Durand Cup, which ended in a 4–1 win. He provided the assist to Vikram Pratap Singh for their equaliser. Six days later, he scored his first goal for the club, which was the equaliser for the club against ATK Mohun Bagan, which ended in a 1–1 stalemate.

On 28 October 2022, he scored his first ISL goal for Mumbai, coming away against his former club Kerala Blasters at Kochi. Following a goal-less game against ATK Mohun Bagan at home, he went on a four-game scoring streak, getting a goal away against Chennaiyin FC, at home against Bengaluru FC, at home away against NorthEast United FC, and then a brace at home against FC Goa. These goals were crucial in starting Mumbai's winning run, which extended to 11 games, which is an ISL record.

Diaz's goals continued to help Mumbai break records, as the club also set the record for the longest unbeaten run in ISL history, standing at 18 games without defeat. This led to Mumbai winning the ISL Shield for the second time in their history, the only team to do so. This was Diaz's first trophy in India.

The season was a fruitful one for Diaz, as he was able to contribute 21 goal contributions in the 24 games he played in all competitions. Due to his performances, on 26 May 2023, Diaz signed a one-year contract extension, valid until the end of the 2023–24 season.

==== 2023-24 season ====
Diaz made his first appearance of the 23–24 season in the 2023 Durand Cup on 5 August 2023 against Mohammedan SC, where he also scored his first goal of the season, coincidentally on his 33rd birthday. He scored in the club's next two group stage matches as well against Jamshedpur FC II and the Indian Navy football team. He scored in the quarter final against Mohun Bagan SG as well, but the Islanders eventually lost the match 3-1 and were knocked out of the Durand Cup.

Diaz made his AFC Champions League debut in the club's next match, at home against F.C. Nassaji Mazandaran. Diaz played the full 90 minutes in a 2–0 loss for the Islanders.

Diaz played his first ISL match of the season away against NorthEast United FC, scoring a brace to help Mumbai win the match 2–1. In the club's next match away against Odisha FC, he scored a late equalizer with a header to secure a 2–2 draw. In the club's first home match, against Diaz's former club Kerala Blasters, he scored the first goal of the match with a close-range finish. His pressing also led to Apuia's winning goal, as the match ended 2–1 in favour of Mumbai.

After failing to score against Hyderabad FC, Diaz scored the winning goal in a 2–1 win at home against Punjab FC. His winning goal came 52 seconds after midfielder Greg Stewart had scored Mumbai's equalizer.

In the 2024 Super Cup semi final against Odisha FC, Diaz was shown a red card following a brawl, and was eventually given a four-match ban. Even after serving his ban, he struggled with injury and illness, leading to his absence for three more games. He returned to action on 12 March 2024, at home against NorthEast United, coming on as a 76th-minute substitute for Bipin Singh in an eventual 4–1 win for Mumbai. He scored his first goal after returning away against Hyderabad FC through a penalty. This was the third and final goal of the match, which ended 3–0 to Mumbai.

In the club's final game of the season, Mumbai needed to defeat Mohun Bagan Super Giant to win the ISL Shield. However, the team lost 2–1, allowing Mohun Bagan to take the Shield.

In the ISL Cup semi-final second leg, Diaz scored the first goal of the match with a close-range tap-in. Lallianzuala Chhangte scored the second goal of the match, sending Mumbai to the ISL Cup final. In the final, once again against Mohun Bagan Super Giant, Diaz scored the equalizing goal after running onto a long pass from Alberto Noguera. Mumbai went on to win 3–1 after goals from Bipin Singh and Jakub Vojtus. This was Diaz's first ISL Cup, meaning he won both major ISL honours during his time at Mumbai. He was crucial in this ISL Cup triumph, scoring 10 ISL goals throughout the season.

On 29 May 2024, Mumbai confirmed that Diaz would be leaving the club upon the expiry of his contract.

=== Bengaluru FC ===
On 23 August 2024, after his Mumbai contract ended, Diaz signed for fellow ISL club Bengaluru FC. On May 29, 2025, Bengaluru announced he would be departing the club upon the expiry of his contract.

=== Return to Mumbai City ===
On 17 June 2025, Mumbai City announced Diaz's return to the club. Diaz scored on his second debut for the club on 27 October 2025, opening the scoring in the club's first match of the Super Cup against SC Delhi. The match eventually ended 4–1 to the Islanders. On 22 August 2026, following the expiry of his contract, Diaz left the club.

== Career statistics ==
As of match played 23 April 2025

Appearances and goals by club, season and competition
Club	Season	League			Cup (Note: Includes Copa Argentina, Malaysia FA Cup, Copa MX, Super Cup)		Continental		Other		Total	
Club	Season	Division	Apps	Goals	Apps	Goals	Apps	Goals	Apps	Goals	Apps	Goals
Ferro Carril Oeste	2008–09	Primera Nacional	4	0	0	0	—		—		4	0
Ferro Carril Oeste	2009–10	Primera Nacional	1	0	0	0	—		—		1	0
Ferro Carril Oeste	2010–11	Primera Nacional	22	5	0	0	—		—		22	5
Ferro Carril Oeste	2011–12	Primera Nacional	36	4	1	0	—		—		37	4
Ferro Carril Oeste	2012–13	Primera Nacional	23	6	0	0	—		—		23	6
Ferro Carril Oeste	Total		86	15	1	0	—		—		87	15
Atlético Lanús	2012–13	Primera División	6	0	1	0	6 (Note: Appearance(s) in Copa Sudamericana)	0	—		13	0
Atlético Lanús	2013–14	Primera División	25	5	0	0	5 (Note: Appearance(s) in Copa Libertadores)	1	—		30	6
Atlético Lanús	Total		31	5	1	0	11	1	—		43	6
Johor Darul Ta'zim	2014	Malaysia Super League	19	8	8	8	—		—		27	16
Johor Darul Ta'zim	2015	Malaysia Super League	4	0	0	0	3 (Note: One appearance and two goals in AFC Cup, Two appearances in AFC Champions League)	2	—		7	2
Johor Darul Ta'zim	2016	Malaysia Super League	22	18	7	8	9 (Note: Eight appearances and six goals in AFC Cup, One appearance in AFC Champions League)	6	—		38	32
Johor Darul Ta'zim	2018	Malaysia Super League	4	2	0	0	2 (Note: One appearance and one goal in AFC Cup, One appearance and two goals in AFC Champions League)	3	—		6	5
Johor Darul Ta'zim	Total		49	28	15	16	14	11	—		78	55
Independiente (loan)	2015	Primera División	6	0	0	0	1	0	—		7	0
León (loan)	2016–17	Liga MX	4	0	3	0	0	0	—		7	0
León (loan)	2017–18	Liga MX	9	1	1	2	0	0	—		10	3
León (loan)	Total		13	1	4	2	0	0	—		17	3
Atlético Lanús	2018–19	Primera División	11	0	2	0	0	0	—		13	0
Bolívar	2019	Bolivian Primera División	35	19	—		2	2	—		37	21
Bolívar	2020	Bolivian Primera División	6	0	—		1	0	—		7	0
Bolívar	Total		41	19	—		3	2	—		44	21
San Marcos de Arica	2020	Primera B de Chile	7	2	—		—		—		7	2
Atlético Platense	2021	Primera División	12	2	—		—		—		12	2
Kerala Blasters (loan)	2021–22	Indian Super League	21	8	—		—		—		21	8
Mumbai City	2022–23	Indian Super League	20	11	0	0	—		5 (Note: Four appearances and one goal in Durand Cup, one appearance in play-offs for AFC Champions League)	1	25	12
Mumbai City	2023–24	Indian Super League	17	10	3	0	5 (Note: Appearance(s) in AFC Champions League)	0	4 (Note: Appearance(s) in Durand Cup)	5	29	15
Mumbai City	Total		37	21	3	0	5	0	9	6	54	27
Bengaluru	2024–25	Indian Super League	18	3	1	0	—		5	3	24	6
Mumbai City	2025–26	Indian Super League	7	1	4	1	—		—		11	2
Samleswari	2026–27	Indian Football League	0	0	0	0	—		—		0	0
Career total			325	103	31	19	34	14	14	9	404	145

== Honours ==
Lanús

- Copa Sudamericana: 2013

Johor Darul Ta'zim

- Malaysia Super League: 2014, 2016
- Malaysia Charity Shield: 2015, 2016, 2018
- Malaysia FA Cup: 2016

Kerala Blasters

- ISL Cup runner-up: 2021–22

Mumbai City

- Indian Super League: 2022–23
- ISL Cup: 2023–24
- Durand Cup runner-up: 2022

Bengaluru FC

- ISL Cup runner-up: 2024–25
