= Damion Stewart =

Jamaican footballer (born 1980)

Personal information
- Full name: Damion Delano Stewart
- Date of birth: 18 August 1980 (age 46)
- Place of birth: Jamaica
- Height: 1.91 m (6 ft 3 in)
- Position: Defender

Senior career*
Years	Team	Apps	(Gls)
1999–2006	Harbour View FC	141	(11)
2005–2006	→ Bradford City (loan)	23	(1)
2006–2010	Queens Park Rangers	168	(13)
2010–2012	Bristol City	24	(1)
2012	→ Notts County (loan)	17	(2)
2012–2013	Notts County	7	(0)
2013–2015	Pahang FA	39	(2)
2016	Harbour View FC		
2016–2017	Perlis FA	15	(0)
Total		434	(30)

International career
1999–2012	Jamaica	56	(3)

Managerial career
- 2019–2020: Harbour View (Head coach)
- * Club domestic league appearances and goals

Damion Delano Stewart (born 18 August 1980) is a Jamaican professional footballer who last played for Perlis FA in the Malaysia Premier League.

== Club career ==
=== Harbour View FC ===
Stewart played for Jamaica side Harbour View FC where he garnered the nickname "Stew Peas". While playing as defensive stalwart at Harbour View, his club won the Jamaica National Premier League in 2000 and CFU Club Championship in 2004. In February 2005, he had a trial with Darlington, following which he was due to sign for the rest of the 2004–05, until his move was blocked by the Home Office.

=== Bradford City ===
He returned to England in the summer with Bradford City and signed a season long loan for the 2005–06 season. He made his Bradford debut as a half-time substitute in a 2–0 defeat to Southend United on 9 August 2005. His first start came on 12 November 2005 when he was substituted after just 27 minutes. He scored his first goal in a 1–0 victory over AFC Bournemouth to help ease Bradford's relegation worries. In total, he played 23 league games during his loan spell as Bradford came 11th in League One.

=== Queens Park Rangers ===
Bradford manager Colin Todd had hoped to keep Stewart on, but his form earned him a six-figure transfer to Championship side Queens Park Rangers. After a shaky start to life in the Championship, Stewart hit form after the arrival of Danny Cullip from Nottingham Forest. He soon cemented his place in the Queens Park Rangers side and played more than 80 games in the 2006–07 and 2007–08 seasons. In the 2007–08 season, Stewart scored five goals, but was also sent off twice. He memorably scored the only goal as QPR knocked Aston Villa out of the 2008–09 League Cup with a 1–0 victory at Villa Park.

=== Bristol City ===
He joined Bristol City on a three-year contract, in July 2010, for an undisclosed fee. He made his Championship debut for City against Millwall on 7 August and was booked twice, resulting in a red card. He scored his first goal against Doncaster a week later. He was released on 31 August 2012.

=== Loan to Notts County ===
On 5 January 2012, Damion joined Notts County on a loan until the end of the season.

=== Notts County ===
Damion signed a short-term contract with Notts County on 2 November 2012.

=== Pahang FA ===
On 5 April 2013, Pahang FA confirmed that had secured the services of 32-year-old Jamaican defender, Damion Stewart. The former Notts County and Queens Park Rangers played against Police PDRM FA and Kuala Lumpur at the Temerloh Stadium. The lanky Stewart, who has 55 caps, formed a partnership with Jalaluddin Jaafar, Zaiza 'The Lord' Zainal Abidin, Razman Roslan and Saiful Nizam Miswan in defence. On 3 November 2013, Stewart assisted Pahang to win the Malaysian Cup.

=== Perlis FA ===
After a successful time with Pahang FA, Stewart was confirmed by Perlis FA coach, Dollah Salleh on July that he was signed by the team during the second transfer window to strengthen the team in order to face the remaining matches in the 2016 Malaysia Premier League. In July 2017, he was released from Perlis FA.

== International career ==
Stewart played for the Jamaica Under-20 and Under-23 youth national teams. He made his international debut for Jamaica National Football Team in 1999 against Ghana. He has played in the 2003, 2005, and 2009 CONCACAF Gold Cups and numerous World Cup qualification matches since his senior team debut.

== Managerial career ==
In 2019, Stewart was named head coach of Harbour View FC.

== Career statistics ==
=== International ===
Appearances and goals by national team and year
National team	Year	Apps	Goals
Jamaica	1999	1	0
Jamaica	2000	1	0
Jamaica	2001	–	
Jamaica	2002	–	
Jamaica	2003	11	0
Jamaica	2004	12	0
Jamaica	2005	12	2
Jamaica	2006	5	0
Jamaica	2007	1	0
Jamaica	2008	3	0
Jamaica	2009	7	1
Jamaica	2010	–	
Jamaica	2011	–	
Jamaica	2012	3	0
Total		56	3

Scores and results list Jamaica's goal tally first, score column indicates score after each Stewart goal.

List of international goals scored by Damion Stewart
No.	Date	Venue	Opponent	Score	Result	Competition
1	8 January 2005	Independence Park, Kingston, Jamaica	French Guiana	2–0	5–0	2005 Caribbean Cup qualification
2	10 July 2005	Los Angeles Memorial Coliseum, Los Angeles, United States	South Africa	2–2	3–3	2005 CONCACAF Gold Cup
3	23 May 2009	Lockhart Stadium, Fort Lauderdale, United States	Haiti	2–1	3–1	Friendly

== Honours ==
=== Club ===
- Jamaica National Premier League:
  - Winners (1): 2000
- JFF Champions Cup:
  - Winners (2): 2001, 2002
  - Runner-up (2): 2003, 2005
- Malaysia Cup: 2
  - Winners (2): 2013, 2014
- Malaysia FA Cup: 1
  - Winners (1): 2014
- Malaysia Charity Shield
  - Winners (1): 2014

International

- CFU Club Championship:
  - Winners (1): 2004
