= Hafiz Kamal =

Malaysian footballer

Personal information
- Full name: Mohd Hafiz bin Kamal
- Date of birth: 9 July 1987 (age 39)
- Place of birth: Pantai Remis, Perak, Malaysia
- Height: 1.76 m (5 ft 9 1/2 in)
- Position: Midfielder

Team information
- Current team: Immigration FC II
- Number: 21

Youth career
- 2008–2009: Shahzan Muda

Senior career*
Years	Team	Apps	(Gls)
2009–2011	Shahzan Muda	32	(8)
2012–2015	Pahang	73	(38)
2016	Selangor	17	(2)
2017–2018	Perak TBG	15	(4)
2019	PKNP		
2020–2021	Kuala Lumpur Rovers		
2021–2022	Respect F.C.		
2023–25	Immigration		
2025–	Immigration FC II		

International career^{‡}
2014–	Malaysia	8	(0)
Medal record
Men's football
Representing Malaysia
ASEAN Championship
Runner-up	2014 AFF Championship
- * Club domestic league appearances and goals ‡ National team caps and goals as of 17 November 2016

Mohd Hafiz bin Kamal (born 9 July 1987) is a Malaysian professional footballer who plays as a midfielder for Immigration FC II.

== International career ==
Hafiz has been called up for the national team by Ong Kim Swee in February 2014. On 1 March 2014, Hafiz made his debut for Malaysia in friendly match against Philippines. He started the game and was replaced by Badhri Radzi.

=== International statistics ===
#	Date	Venue	Opponent	Result	Competition
2014
1.	1 March	Selayang, Malaysia	Philippines	0–0	Friendly
2.	5 March	Al Ain, UAE	Yemen	2–1 (W)	2015 AFC Asian Cup qualification
3.	27 April	Cebu, Philippines	Philippines	0–0	Friendly
4.	20 September	Shah Alam, Malaysia	Cambodia	4–1 (W)	Friendly
5.	12 November	Shah Alam, Malaysia	Syria	0–3 (L)	Friendly
6.	26 November	Jalan Besar Stadium, Singapore	Thailand	2–3 (L)	2014 AFF Suzuki Cup
7.	29 November	Kallang Stadium, Singapore	Singapore	3–1 (W)	2014 AFF Suzuki Cup
8.	7 December	Shah Alam Stadium, Malaysia	Vietnam	1–2 (L)	2014 AFF Suzuki Cup

== Honours ==
=== Club ===
Pahang FA

- Malaysia Cup (2): 2013, 2014
- FA Cup (1): 2014
- Malaysian Charity Shield (1): 2014
- Piala Emas Raja-Raja (1): 2011

=== International ===
- 2014 AFF Suzuki Cup: Runner up
