= Tan Sri Dato' Haji Hassan Yunos Stadium =

Stadium in Johor Bahru, Malaysia

Coordinates: 1°29′51″N 103°45′05″E

Tan Sri Dato' Haji Hassan Yunos Stadium Larkin Stadium
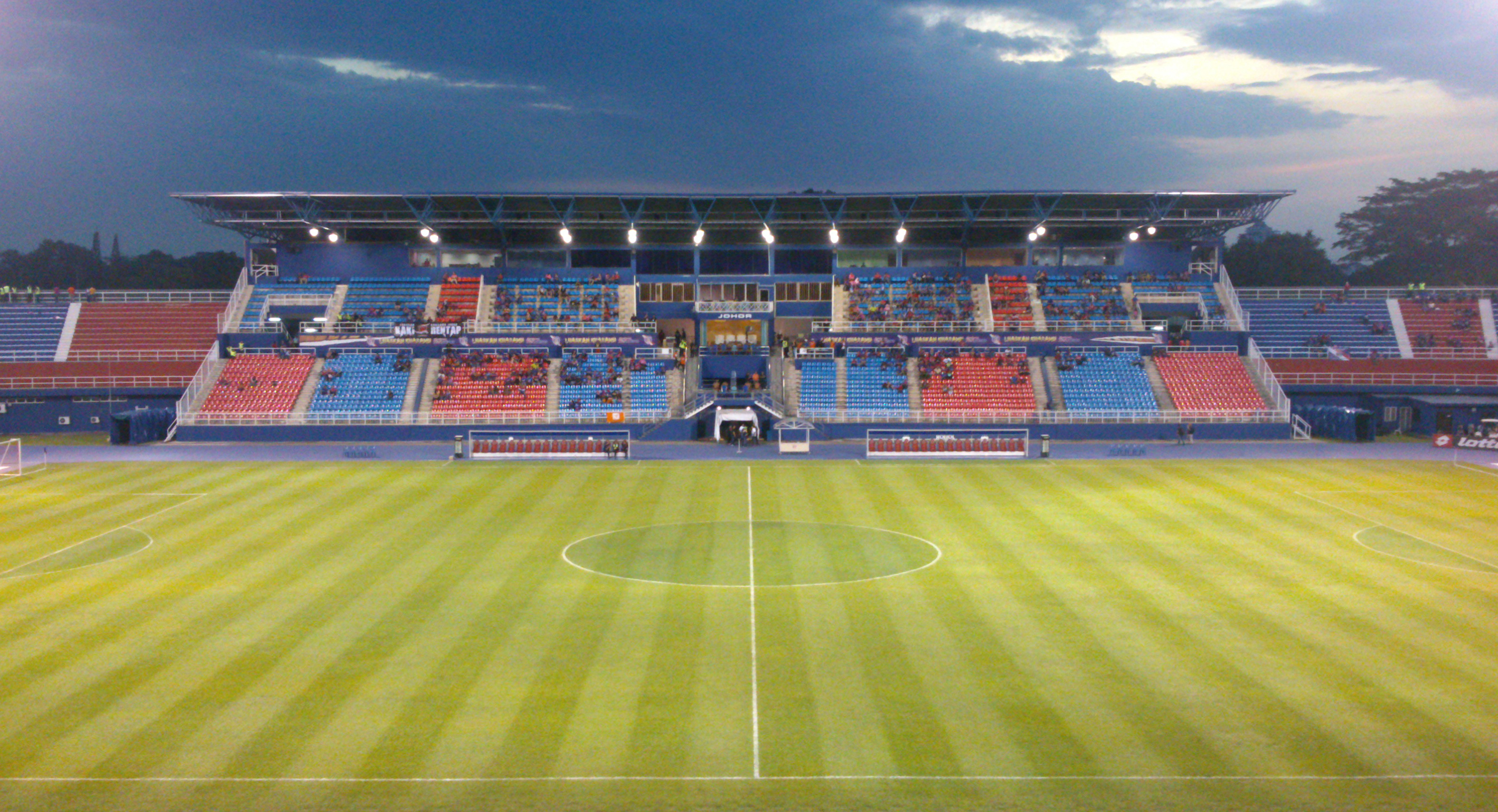
- Interactive map of Tan Sri Dato' Haji Hassan Yunos Stadium; Larkin Stadium
- Location: Jalan Dato' Jaafar, 80350 Larkin, Johor Bahru, Johor, Malaysia
- Owner: Johor Football Association
- Operator: Johor Football Association
- Capacity: 30,000
- Surface: Grass

Construction
- Built: 1964
- Renovated: 1991, 2013
- Expanded: 1991
- Cost: RM 240 million (renovation cost)

Tenants
- Johor Darul Ta'zim (until 2019); Johor Darul Ta'zim II (2020–present)

Tan Sri Dato' Haji Hassan Yunos Stadium, also known as Larkin Stadium, is a multi-purpose stadium in Larkin, Johor Bahru, Johor, Malaysia. It is currently used mostly for football matches. The stadium holds 30,000 people and opened in 1964. It is named after former Menteri Besar of Johor, Tan Sri Hassan Yunus.

The stadium is located near Larkin Sentral.

== History ==
When the stadium was built in 1964, it was only a minor venue that could accommodate 15,000 spectators. In 1991, a minor revamp doubled the capacity. Athletics track, floodlight masts and media infrastructure were also added, allowing the ground to host major events. One of the major events came in 1997 when the 1997 FIFA World Youth Championship was played at the venue. Seats were installed as part of the event preparation.
