= 2016 Johor Darul Ta'zim F.C. season =

Johor Darul Ta'zim F.C.
2016 season
- Chairmen: Dato' Haji Ismail Karim (until 27 July); Tun Aminah Maimunah (from 27 July)
- Head Coach: Mario Gomez
- Stadium: Larkin Stadium
- Super League: 1st
- Charity Shield: Winners
- FA Cup: Winners
- Malaysia Cup: Group stage
- Champions League play-off: Preliminary round 2
- AFC Cup: Semi-finals
- Top goalscorer: League: Pereyra Díaz (18); All: Pereyra Díaz (32)
- Highest home attendance: 13 Feb 2016 – (26,800) vs Selangor ( 1–1 )
- Lowest home attendance: 11 May 2016 – (6,545) vs Bengaluru FC ( 3–0 )
- Average home league attendance: 17,459
- Biggest win: 8–1 vs Ayeyawady United (H), 24 February 2016, AFC Cup
- Biggest defeat: 0–3 vs Perak (A), 30 July 2016, Malaysia Cup
Home colours	Away colours	Third colours

The 2016 season was Johor Darul Ta'zim F.C.'s 44th season in club history and their fourth season in the Malaysia Super League since rebranding from Johor FC. The season was notable as JDT won their first-ever Malaysia FA Cup title in the club's 43-year history.

== Season overview ==
The 2016 season was a dominant one for Johor Darul Ta'zim, as the club won a third consecutive Malaysia Super League title, claimed their first-ever Malaysia FA Cup trophy, and completed the league-and-cup double, though their AFC Cup defence ended in the semi-finals.

=== Super League ===
JDT began their Malaysia Super League campaign on 13 February and concluded it on 22 October, finishing as champions with 58 points from 22 matches, recording 18 wins, 4 draws, and no defeats, with 56 goals scored and 14 conceded for a goal difference of +42. The title was JDT's third consecutive Malaysia Super League crown, making them the first team to win the competition three times in a row. Remarkably, JDT completed the entire league season unbeaten, becoming the first Malaysian club ever to achieve this feat. The title was sealed on 9 September with a 3–0 win over Terengganu at the Larkin Stadium, giving JDT an unassailable 10-point lead over second-placed Felda United.

==== FA Cup ====
The Malaysia FA Cup was where JDT secured a major piece of club history, winning the trophy for the first time in the club's 43-year existence. After entering in the second round, JDT progressed through the competition with six wins and one draw from seven matches, scoring 21 goals and conceding 7. In the final, played on 14 May at the Shah Alam Stadium, JDT defeated PKNS 2–1 to lift their maiden FA Cup title. The victory also guaranteed JDT a place in the 2017 AFC Cup.

==== Malaysia Cup ====
In contrast to their domestic dominance, JDT's Malaysia Cup campaign ended in disappointment at the group stage. Despite being the reigning MSL and AFC Cup champions, JDT were knocked out after being held to a 1–1 draw by PKNS on 20 August, failing to advance beyond the group stage. The early exit meant JDT were unable to challenge for a treble, despite their league and FA Cup triumphs earlier in the season.

==== AFC Cup ====
JDT entered the AFC Cup as defending champions following their historic 2015 triumph, but were unable to retain the trophy. After progressing through the early rounds, JDT reached the semi-finals, where they were eliminated by Indian side Bengaluru FC. Despite the semi-final exit, JDT's continental campaign, combined with their unbeaten league title and maiden FA Cup win, made 2016 one of the most successful seasons in the club's history.

=== Appointment of new chairwoman ===
On 27 July 2016, Tunku Tun Aminah binti Sultan Ibrahim, sister of club owner Tunku Ismail Sultan Ibrahim, has been appointed as the President of Johor DT.

== Player Information ==
=== Squad ===
No.	Name	Nationality	Join	Date of birth (age)	Signed from
Goalkeepers
1	Mohd Farizal Marlias	(Malaysia)	2015	29 June 1986 (aged 29)	(Malaysia) Selangor
22	K. Sasi Kumar	(Malaysia)	2016	29 April 1989 (aged 26)	(Malaysia) Johor Darul Ta'zim II
24	Mohd Izham Tarmizi	(Malaysia)	2013	24 April 1991 (aged 24)	(Malaysia) Harimau Muda
Defenders
4	Mohd Asraruddin Putra Omar	(Malaysia)	2014	25 March 1988 (aged 27)	(Malaysia) Selangor
6	Marcos António	(Brazil)	2014	25 May 1983 (aged 32)	(Malaysia) Nürnberg
7	Aidil Zafuan	(Malaysia)	2013	3 August 1987 (aged 28)	(Malaysia) ATM
15	Muhammad Fazly Mazlan	(Malaysia)	2013	22 December 1993 (aged 22)	(Malaysia) Youth system
18	Mahali Jasuli	(Malaysia)	2014	2 April 1989 (aged 26)	(Malaysia) Selangor
26	Mohd Amer Saidin	(Malaysia)	2015	25 July 1992 (aged 23)	(Malaysia) Harimau Muda A
27	Mohd Fadhli Mohd Shas	(Malaysia)	2014	21 January 1991 (aged 24)	(Malaysia) Harimau Muda A
Midfielders
2	Azamuddin Akil	(Malaysia)	2016	16 April 1985 (aged 30)	(Malaysia) Pahang
5	Amirul Hadi Zainal	(Malaysia)	2014	27 May 1986 (aged 29)	(Malaysia) Pahang
8	Mohd Safiq Rahim	(Malaysia)	2013	5 July 1987 (aged 28)	(Malaysia) Selangor
12	S. Kunanlan	(Malaysia)	2015	15 September 1986 (aged 29)	(Malaysia) Selangor
13	Gary Steven Robbat	(Malaysia)	2014	3 September 1992 (aged 23)	(Malaysia) Harimau Muda
14	Hariss Harun	(Singapore)	2014	19 November 1990 (aged 25)	(Malaysia) LionsXII
16	Shakir Shaari	(Malaysia)	2014	29 September 1986 (aged 29)	(Malaysia) Kelantan
20	Nazrin Nawi	(Malaysia)	2014	7 February 1988 (aged 27)	(Malaysia) Negeri Sembilan
21	Jasazrin Jamaluddin	(Malaysia)	2012	3 April 1986 (aged 29)	(Malaysia) Johor FA
23	Chanturu Suppiah	(Malaysia)	2015	14 December 1987 (aged 28)	(Malaysia) Sarawak
25	Junior Eldstål	(Malaysia) (Sweden)	2015	16 September 1991 (aged 24)	(Malaysia) Sarawak
28	Azniee Taib	(Malaysia)	2016	18 July 1990 (aged 25)	(Malaysia) Penang
29	Muhammad Akram Mahinan	(Malaysia)	2016	19 January 1993 (aged 22)	(Malaysia) Johor Darul Ta'zim II
Forwards
3	Rozaimi Abdul Rahman	(Malaysia)	2016	6 October 1992 (aged 23)	Unattached
3	Paulo Rangel	(Brazil)	2016	4 February 1985 (aged 30)	(Malaysia) Terengganu
10	Safee Sali	(Malaysia)	2013	28 January 1984 (aged 31)	(Indonesia) Arema
11	Jorge Pereyra Díaz	(Argentina)	2014	5 August 1990 (aged 25)	Unattached
17	Mohd Amri Yahyah	(Malaysia)	2014	21 January 1981 (aged 33)	(Malaysia) Selangor
19	Juan Martín Lucero	(Argentina)	2016	30 November 1991 (aged 23)	(Malaysia) Independiente

== Transfers ==
=== In ===
No.	Pos.	Name	Age	Moving from	Type	Transfer fee	Notes	Ref.
28	FW	(Malaysia) Azinee Taib	25	Penang	Transfer	Undisclosed	—	
—	GK	(Malaysia) (England) Samuel Somerville	21	(England) Tooting & Mitcham United	Transfer	Undisclosed	—	
2	MF	(Malaysia) Azamuddin Akil	30	Pahang	Transfer	Undisclosed	—	
11	FW	(Argentina) Jorge Pereyra Díaz	25	(Argentina) Independiente	Loan return	—	—	
—	FW	(Brazil) Paulo Rangel	30	Terengganu	Transfer	Free	—	
3	FW	(Malaysia) Rozaimi Abdul Rahman	23	Unattached	Transfer	Free	—	
29	MF	(Malaysia) Akram Mahinan	22	(Johor) JDT II	Transfer	Free	—	
22	GK	(Malaysia) K. Sasi Kumar	26	(Johor) JDT II	Transfer	Free	—	
19	FW	(Argentina) Juan Martín Lucero	24	(Argentina) Independiente	Transfer	$ 1,400,000	—	

==== Out ====
No.	Pos.	Name	Age	Moving to	Type	Transfer fee	Notes
19	FW	(Argentina) Luciano Figueroa	34	Retired	End of contract	—	—
22	GK	(Malaysia) Al-Hafiz Hamzah	31	(Johor) JDT II	Transfer	Free	—
15	DF	(Malaysia) Daudsu Jamaluddin	30	Kelantan	Released	Free	—
—	FW	(Brazil) Paulo Rangel	30	(Johor) JDT II	Transfer	Free	—
—	GK	(Malaysia) (England) Samuel Somerville	21	(Johor) JDT II	Transfer	Free	—

==== Contracts ====
No.	Player	Status	Contract length	Expiry date	Other notes	Ref.
8	Safiq Rahim	Extension	Three years	2019		
14	Hariss Harun	Extension	Two years	2018		
—	Paulo Rangel	Transfer	Two years	2018	Transfer to JDT II	
3	Rozaimi Abdul Rahman	Transfer	Three years	2019		
19	Juan Martín Lucero	Transfer	Two years	2018		

== Friendly matches ==
17 January 2016 Friendly	Chonburi (Thailand)	2–0	(Malaysia) Johor Darul Ta'zim	Chonburi, Thailand
18:00 (UTC+7)	Pipob On-Mo 27'; Prakit Deeprom 50'	(HT 1–0)		Stadium: Chonburi Municipality Stadium

20 January 2016 Friendly	BBCU (Thailand)	2–4	(Malaysia) Johor Darul Ta'zim	Nonthaburi, Thailand
18:00 (UTC+7)	Netipong Narkchim 75', 83'	(HT 0–2)	Marcos Antonio 26'; Safiq Rahim 35'; Mohd Azinee Taib 70', 78'	Stadium: Nonthaburi Youth Centre Stadium

26 January 2016 Friendly	Johor Darul Ta'zim (Malaysia)	2–1	(Singapore) Geylang	Johor Bahru, Malaysia
20:45 (UTC+8)	Mohd Amri Yahyah 22'; Amirul Hadi Zainal 90+3'	(HT 1–1)	Amy Recha 35'	Stadium: Larkin Stadium

== Competitions ==
=== Overview ===
Competition	First match	Last match	Starting round	Final position	Record							
Competition	First match	Last match	Starting round	Final position	Pld	W	D	L	GF	GA	GD	Win %
Malaysia Super League (Note: Includes the Charity Shield.)	13 February 2016	22 October 2016	Matchday 1	Winners	22	18	4	0	56	14	+42	81.82
Malaysia FA Cup	19 February 2016	14 May 2016	Second round	Winners	7	6	0	1	21	7	+14	85.71
Malaysia Cup	12 July 2016	20 August 2016	Group stage	Group stage	6	1	4	1	9	9	+0	16.67
AFC Champions League	2 February 2016		Preliminary round 2	Preliminary round 2	1	0	1	0	0	0	+0	0.00
AFC Cup	24 February 2016	19 October 2016	Group stage	Semi-finals	11	8	2	1	33	11	+22	72.73
Total					47	33	11	3	119	41	+78	70.21

Last updated: 22 October 2016
Source: Competitions

=== Malaysia Super League ===
==== Table ====
Pos	Team	Pld	W	D	L	GF	GA	GD	Pts	Qualification or relegation
1	Johor Darul Ta'zim (C)	22	18	4	0	56	14	+42	58	Qualification to AFC Champions League preliminary round 2 (Note: Also qualification to AFC Cup group stage if failed to qualify for the AFC Champions League group stage.)
2	Felda United	22	13	4	5	47	27	+20	43	Qualification to AFC Cup group stage (Note: Since the winners of 2016 Piala FA, Johor Darul Ta'zim, currently qualify for AFC Champions League based on their league position, the spot awarded to the Piala FA winner (AFC Cup group stage) would be passed to the next best team in the table (in this case, the second-placed team).)
3	Kedah	22	11	7	4	30	26	+4	37 (Note: Kedah Football Association (Kedah FA) has been found guilty of putting the suspended player during the match against Pahang on August 3, 2016. Therefore, the Football Association of Malaysia (FAM) has been awarded 3 points for Pahang and Kedah sentenced deducted 3 points for the incident.)	
4	Kelantan	22	7	8	7	37	33	+4	29	
5	Selangor	22	7	7	8	28	27	+1	28	

Source: SPMB Football Association of Malaysia, Football Malaysia LLP
Rules for classification: 1) Points; 2) Goal difference; 3) Number of goals scored; 3) Number of goals against.
(C) Champions

==== Malaysia Super League fixtures and results ====
Win Draw Loss

13 February 2016 1 / Charity Shield	Johor Darul Ta'zim	1–1 (7–6 p)	Selangor	Johor Bahru
21:00 (UTC+8)	Hariss Harun 45'; Mohd Azinee Taib (substituted off) 58'; Azamuddin Akil (substituted on) 58'; Mahali Jasuli (substituted off) 66'; Nazrin Nawi (substituted on) 66'; Juan Martín Lucero (substituted off) 80'; Mohd Amirul Hadi Zainal (substituted on) 80'; Fazly Mazlan (yellow card) 86'	HT (1–0)	Ahmad Hazwan Bakri (substituted off) 27' R. Gopinathan (substituted on) 27'; Nazmi Faiz Mansor (yellow card) 45+3'; Mohd Hafiz Kamal 60'; Nazmi Faiz Mansor (substituted off) 68'; S. Veenod (substituted on) 68'; Robert Cornthwaite (substituted off) 85'; Mohd Razman Roslan (substituted on) 85'	Stadium: Larkin Stadium; Attendance: 26,800; Referee: Syed Azhar Syed Kamar; Man of the Match: Farizal Marlias(Johor Darul Ta'zim)
	Penalties
	(penalty scored) Safiq Rahim; (penalty missed) Jorge Pereyra Díaz; (penalty scored) Nazrin Nawi; (penalty scored) Mohd Amirul Hadi Zainal; (penalty scored) Hariss Harun; (penalty missed) Azamuddin Akil; (penalty scored) Marcos Antonio; (penalty scored) Aidil Zafuan; (penalty scored) S. Kunanlan		(penalty missed) Mauro Olivi; (penalty scored) Patrick Wleh; (penalty scored) S. Veenod; (penalty scored) Mohd Hafiz Kamal; (penalty scored) Mohd Razman Roslan; (penalty missed) R. Gopinathan; (penalty scored) Muhd Shahrom Abdul Kalam; (penalty scored) Mohd Raimi Mohd Nor; (penalty missed) Mohd Azrif Nasrulhaq

16 February 2016 2	T–Team (Terengganu)	0–2	Johor Darul Ta'zim	Kuala Terengganu
21:00 (UTC+8)	Badrul Hisyam Morris (substituted off) 51'; Mohd Asrol Ibrahim (substituted on) 51'; Mohd Zarulizwan Mazlan (substituted off) 60'; Ahmad Takhiyuddin Roslan (substituted on) 60'; Mohd Marzuki Yusof (yellow card) 73'; Mohd Marzuki Yusof (substituted off) 77'; Kamal Azizi Zabri (substituted on) 77'; Makan Konate (penalty missed)	HT (0–1)	Azamuddin Akil 28'; Mohd Amri Yahyah (substituted off) 46'; Jorge Pereyra Díaz (substituted on) 46'; Safee Sali (substituted off) 56'; Juan Martín Lucero (substituted on) 56'; Fadhli Shas (yellow card) 58'; Jorge Pereyra Díaz 59'; Azamuddin Akil (substituted off) 73'; Gary Steven Robbat (substituted on) 73'	Stadium: Sultan Ismail Nasiruddin Shah Stadium; Attendance: 2,126; Referee: Zulkifli Ahmad; Man of the Match: Azamuddin Akil (Johor Darul Ta'zim)

27 February 2016 3	Terengganu	0–2	Johor Darul Ta'zim	Kuala Terengganu
21:00 (UTC+8)	Gustavo Fabian Lopez (substituted off) 40'; Mohd Fakhrurazi Musa (substituted on) 40'; Zairo Anuar (substituted off) 46'; Affize Faisal Mamat (substituted on) 46'; Norshahrul Idlan Talaha (substituted off) 75'; Nasril Izzat Jalil (substituted on) 75'	(HT 0–2)	S. Chanturu 28'; Jorge Pereyra Díaz 33'; Safee Sali (substituted off) 55'; Juan Martín Lucero (substituted on) 55'; Gary Steven Robbat (substituted off) 63'; Jasazrin Jamaluddin (substituted on) 63'; S. Kunanlan (yellow card) 65'; Mohd Azinee Taib (substituted off) 74'; Safiq Rahim (substituted on) 74'	Stadium: Sultan Mizan Zainal Abidin Stadium; Attendance: 11,300; Referee: Syed Azhar Syed Kamar; Man of the Match: Jorge Pereyra Díaz (Johor Darul Ta'zim)

1 March 2016 4	Johor Darul Ta'zim	2–1	(Kuala Lumpur) FELDA United	Johor Bahru
21:00 (UTC+8)	Gary Steven Robbat (substituted off) 32'; Nazrin Nawi (substituted on) 32'; Safiq Rahim (yellow card) 33'; Mahali Jasuli (yellow card) 43'; Mahali Jasuli (substituted off) 46'; S. Chanturu (substituted on) 46'; Jorge Pereyra Díaz 50'; Nazrin Nawi (substituted off) 81'; Mohd Amri Yahyah (substituted on) 81'; S. Chanturu 83'	(HT 0–1)	Ahmad Syamim Yahya (yellow card) 9'; Lutfulla Turaev 29'; Shukor Adan (yellow card) 45+2'; Adib Aizuddin Abdul Latif (red card)	Stadium: Larkin Stadium; Attendance: 16,528; Referee: Mohd Zohri Tajuddin; Man of the Match: Jorge Pereyra Díaz (Johor Darul Ta'zim)

13 March 2016 5	PDRM (Malaysia)	0–2	Johor Darul Ta'zim	Krubong
21:00 (UTC+8)	Abdul Latiff Suhaimi (yellow card) 40'; Ali Ashfaq (substituted off) 59'; Andrezinho (substituted on) 59'; Ahmad Nizam Rodzi (substituted off) 75'; Khairul Izuan Abdullah (substituted on) 75'; Lot Abu Hassan (substituted off) 85'; Hazsyafiq Hamzah (substituted on) 85'	(HT 0–0)	Safiq Rahim 49' pen Azamuddin Akil (substituted off) 68'; Jasazrin Jamaluddin (substituted on) 68'; Jorge Pereyra Díaz 77'; Jorge Pereyra Díaz (substituted off) 82'; Safee Sali (substituted on) 82'; Juan Martín Lucero (substituted off) 83'; S. Chanturu (substituted on) 83'	Stadium: Hang Jebat Stadium; Attendance: 23,000; Referee: Wan Mohd Tarmizi Wan Ibrahim; Man of the Match: Safiq Rahim (Johor Darul Ta'zim)

5 April 2016 6	Johor Darul Ta'zim	2–1	Perak	Johor Bahru
21:00 (UTC+8)	Nazrin Nawi (yellow card) 45+1'; Nazrin Nawi (substituted off) 46'; Mohd Amri Yahyah (substituted on) 46'; Juan Martín Lucero 48' pen, 53'; Aidil Zafuan (yellow card) 59'; S. Chanturu (substituted off) 60'; Mohd Amirul Hadi Zainal (substituted on) 60'; Safiq Rahim (yellow card) 78'; Juan Martín Lucero (substituted off) 82'; Jasazrin Jamaluddin (substituted on) 82'	(HT 0–1)	Elias Fernandes de Oliveira 18'; Khairil Anuar Zamri (yellow card) 27'; Hisyamudin Sha'ari (substituted off) 48'; Raffi Nagoorgani (substituted on) 48'; Nurridzuan Abu Hassan (substituted off) 66'; Firdaus Saiyadi (substituted on) 66'; Vokhid Shodiev (substituted off) 75'; Ridzuan Azly Hussham (substituted on) 75'; Amirul Azahan Aznan (yellow card) 72'	Stadium: Larkin Stadium; Attendance: 20,357; Referee: S. Sittharajan; Man of the Match: Juan Martín Lucero (Johor Darul Ta'zim)

8 April 2016 7	Kelantan	2–2	Johor Darul Ta'zim	Kota Bharu
21:00 (UTC+8)	Jonathan McKain (yellow card) 15'; Zairul Fitree Ishak (substituted off) 46'; Noor Hazrul Mustafa (substituted on) 46'; Indra Putra Mahayuddin 54'; Mohd Badhri Mohd Radzi (substituted off) 59'; Jonatan Lucca (substituted on) 59'; Wan Zaharulnizam Zakaria 68'; Wan Zaharulnizam Zakaria (substituted off) 90+1'; Khairul Izuan Rosli (substituted on) 90+1'	(HT 0–1)	Juan Martín Lucero 9', 53'; Mohd Amirul Hadi Zainal (substituted off) 72'; Gary Steven Robbat (substituted on) 72'; Azamuddin Akil (substituted off) 72'; Mohd Azinee Taib (substituted on) 72'; Juan Martín Lucero (yellow card) 80'; Juan Martín Lucero (substituted off) 85'; Fadhli Shas (substituted on) 85'	Stadium: Sultan Mohammad IV Stadium; Attendance: 13,543; Referee: Mohd Fairuzi Bin Mat Desa; Man of the Match: Wan Zaharulnizam Zakaria (Kelantan

20 April 2016 8	Johor Darul Ta'zim	5–2	Sarawak	Johor Bahru
20:15 (UTC+8)	Jorge Pereyra Díaz 4'; Marcos Antonio 34'; Juan Martín Lucero 35'; Mohd Shahrol Saperi 40' o.g. Fazly Mazlan 44'; Juan Martín Lucero (substituted off) 53'; Hariss Harun (substituted on) 53'; Mohd Amirul Hadi Zainal (substituted off) 66'; Gary Steven Robbat (substituted on) 66'; Jorge Pereyra Díaz (substituted off) 72'; Safee Sali (substituted on) 72'; Safiq Rahim (penalty missed)	(HT 5–1)	K. Gurusamy 14'; K. Thanaraj (substituted off) 20'; Mohd Dzulazlan Ibrahim (substituted on) 20'; Davide Grassi (yellow card) 64'; Fadhli Shas 67' o.g. Mohd Hairol Mokhtar (substituted off) 78'; Rodney Celvin Akwensivie (substituted on) 78'; Mohd Shahrol Saperi (substituted off) 81'; Syahrul Azwari Ibrahim (substituted on) 81'	Stadium: Larkin Stadium; Attendance: 13,860; Referee: Suhaimi Mat Hassan

23 April 2016 9	Kedah	1–1	Johor Darul Ta'zim	Alor Setar
21:00 (UTC+8)	Baddrol Bakhtiar 1'; Kahê (yellow card) 26'; Muhammad Farhan Roslan (substituted off) 31'; Syafiq Ahmad (substituted on) 31'; Abdul Halim Saari (substituted off) 59'; Sandro (substituted on) 59'; Rizal Ghazali (substituted off) 83'; Ariff Farhan Isa (substituted on) 83'	(HT 1–1)	S. Kunanlan (substituted off) 15'; Jasazrin Jamaluddin (substituted on) 15'; Safiq Rahim (yellow card) 24'; Mohd Amirul Hadi Zainal (substituted off) 37'; Mohd Amri Yahyah (substituted on) 37'; Jorge Pereyra Díaz (yellow card) 41'; Juan Martín Lucero 45+3' pen, Hariss Harun (yellow card) 65'; Mohd Amri Yahyah (yellow card) 76'; Mahali Jasuli (substituted off) 80'; Mohd Azinee Taib (substituted on) 80'	Stadium: Darul Aman Stadium; Attendance: 8,763; Referee: Mohd Amirul Izwan Yaakob; Man of the Match: Mohd Farhan Abu Bakar (Kedah FA)

6 May 2016 10	Johor Darul Ta'zim	1–0	Penang	Johor Bahru
21:00 (UTC+8)	Azamuddin Akil (substituted off) 56'; S. Chanturu (substituted on) 56'; Mohd Azinee Taib (substituted off) 62'; Mohd Amri Yahyah (substituted on) 62'; Hariss Harun (substituted off) 80'; Safee Sali (substituted on) 80'; Safee Sali 90+3'	(HT 0–0)	Sani Anuar Kamsani (yellow card) 55'; Failee Ghazli (substituted off) 58'; Faizat Ghazli (substituted on) 58'; Osas Saha (substituted off) 65'; Mohd Faiz Subri (substituted on) 65'; S. Kumaahran (substituted off) 74'; Mohd Syamer Kutty Abba (substituted on) 74'; Mohd Syamer Kutty Abba (yellow card) 83'; Reinaldo Lobo (yellow card) 90'	Stadium: Larkin Stadium; Attendance: 15,513; Referee: Mohd Zohri Tajuddin; Man of the Match: Safee Sali (Johor Darul Ta'zim)

18 May 2016 11	Johor Darul Ta'zim	3–0	Pahang	Johor Bahru
21:00 (UTC+8)	Mohd Azinee Taib (substituted off) 26'; Mohd Amri Yahyah (substituted on) 26'; Azamuddin Akil (substituted off) 54'; S. Chanturu (substituted on) 54'; Mohd Amirul Hadi Zainal 55'; Juan Martín Lucero 63' pen, 65'; Hariss Harun (yellow card) 75'; Juan Martín Lucero (substituted off) 82'; Safee Sali (substituted on) 82'	(HT 0–0)	Salomon Raj (yellow card) 53'; Helmi Abdullah (substituted off) 66'; German Pacheco (substituted on) 66'; Mohd Fauzi Roslan (substituted off) 78'; Faizal Abdul Rani (substituted on) 78'; D. Saarvindran (substituted off) 84'; Shah Amirul Mohd Zamri (substituted on) 84'	Stadium: Larkin Stadium; Attendance: 15,514; Referee: Zulkifli Ahmad; Man of the Match: Juan Martín Lucero (Johor Darul Ta'zim)

21 May 2016 12	Pahang	0–6	Johor Darul Ta'zim	Kuantan
21:00 (UTC+8)	Dalibor Volas (substituted off) 22'; Faizal Abdul Rani (substituted on) 22'; Zesh Rehman (yellow card) 25'; German Pacheco (yellow card) 51'; Mohd Fauzi Roslan (substituted off) 70'; Faisal Halim (substituted on) 70'; Zesh Rehman (substituted off) 83'; Shah Amirul Mohd Zamri (substituted on) 83'	(HT 0–3)	Juan Martín Lucero 7', 47'; Mohd Amirul Hadi Zainal (yellow card) 20'; Jorge Pereyra Díaz 29', 55', 76', (substituted off) 79'; Marcos Antonio 34', (substituted off) 60'; Hariss Harun (substituted on) 60'; Jasazrin Jamaluddin (substituted off) 63'; Mohd Amer Saidin (substituted on) 63'; Mahali Jasuli (yellow card) 68'; Safee Sali (substituted on) 79'; Mohd Izham Tarmizi (yellow card) 87'	Stadium: Darul Makmur Stadium; Attendance: 5,733; Referee: Wan Mohamad Tarmizi; Man of the Match: Jorge Pereyra Díaz (Johor Darul Ta'zim)

16 July 2016 13	Johor Darul Ta'zim	5–0	Kedah	Johor Bahru
21:00 (UTC+8)	Safiq Rahim 28', 41'; Hariss Harun (yellow card) 45' (substituted off) 87'; Marcos Antonio 67'; Mohd Amri Yahyah (substituted off) 71'; Mohd Azinee Taib (substituted on) 71'; Jorge Pereyra Díaz 80', 85'; Azamuddin Akil (substituted off) 84'; S. Chanturu (substituted on) 84'; Mohd Amirul Hadi Zainal (substituted on) 87'	(HT 2–0)	Syazwan Tajuddin (substituted off) 61'; Farhan Roslan (substituted on) 61'; Baddrol Bakhtiar (yellow card) 63'; Thiago Augusto Fernandes (substituted off) 68'; Syafiq Ahmad (substituted on) 68'; Baddrol Bakhtiar (substituted off) 74'; Ariff Farhan Isa (substituted on) 74'	Stadium: Larkin Stadium; Attendance: 10,580; Referee: Khairulazuan Bin Kidam; Man of the Match: Safiq Rahim (Johor Darul Ta'zim)

22 July 2016 14	Sarawak	1–2	Johor Darul Ta'zim	Kuching
21:00 (UTC+8)	Shreen Tambi (substituted off) 73'; Ndumba Makeche (substituted on) 73'; Syahrul Azwari Ibrahim 78'; K. Thanaraj (substituted off) 88'; Tommy Mawat Bada (substituted on) 88'	(HT 0–1)	Marcos Antonio 22' (yellow card) 85'; Farizal Marlias (yellow card) 37'; Azamuddin Akil (substituted off) 58'; S. Chanturu (substituted on) 58'; S. Kunanlan (substituted off) 61'; Azrif Nasrulhaq (substituted on) 61'; Fazly Mazlan (yellow card) 65'; Mohd Azinee Taib 69' (substituted off) 85'; Mohd Amri Yahyah (substituted on) 85'	Stadium: Sarawak Stadium; Attendance: 5,916; Referee: S. Sittharajan

26 July 2016 15	Johor Darul Ta'zim	1–0	Kelantan	Johor Bahru
21:00 (UTC+8)	Mohd Azinee Taib (yellow card) 41' (substituted off) 56'; Jorge Pereyra Díaz 47'; Mohd Amri Yahyah (substituted on) 56'; Fazly Mazlan (substituted off) 72'; Azrif Nasrulhaq (substituted on) 72'; Azamuddin Akil (substituted off) 79'; Mohd Amirul Hadi Zainal (substituted on) 79'; Juan Martín Lucero (yellow card) 85'	(HT 0–0)	Nik Shahrul Azim Abdul Halim (yellow card) 53'; Mohd Daudsu Jamaluddin (yellow card) 62' (substituted off) 72'; Indra Putra Mahayuddin (substituted on) 72'; Noor Hazrul Mustafa (substituted off) 80'; Abdul Manaf Mamat (substituted on) 80'	Stadium: Larkin Stadium; Attendance: 16,550; Referee: Syed Azhar Syed Kamar

3 August 2016 16	Penang	1–1	Johor Darul Ta'zim	George Town
21:00 (UTC+8)	Farisham Ismail (yellow card) 29'; Mohd Fitri Omar 68' (substituted off) 79'; Mafry Balang (substituted off) 67'; Fauzan Dzulkifli (substituted on) 67'; Rafiuddin Rodin (substituted on) 79'; Faizat Ghazli (substituted off) 90'; Mohd Faiz Subri (substituted on) 90'	(HT 0–1)	Jorge Pereyra Díaz 12'; Azamuddin Akil (substituted off) 57'; S. Chanturu (substituted on) 57'; Aidil Zafuan (yellow card) 59'; Mohd Amirul Hadi Zainal (substituted off) 82'; Safiq Rahim (substituted on) 82'; S. Kunanlan (yellow card) 90+1'; Mohd Azinee Taib (substituted off) 90+1'; Mohd Amri Yahyah (substituted on) 90+1'	Stadium: Bandaraya Stadium; Attendance: 13,727; Referee: Mohd Fairuzi Mat Desa

6 August 2016 17	Perak	0–1	Johor Darul Ta'zim	Ipoh
21:00 (UTC+8)	Kenny Pallraj (yellow card) 32'; Mohd Fikri Sudin (substituted off) 46'; Mohd Nor Hakim Isa (substituted on) 46' (yellow card) 90+2'; Mohd Hafiz Ramdan (substituted off) 46'; Ahmad Khairil Anuar (substituted on) 46'; Oybek Kilichev (substituted off) 88'; Hisyamudin Sha'ari (substituted on) 88'	(HT 0–1)	Jorge Pereyra Díaz 16'; Hariss Harun (yellow card) 18'; Aidil Zafuan (yellow card) 41'; Juan Martín Lucero (yellow card) 50'; Azamuddin Akil (yellow card) 68' (substituted off) 88'; Mohd Azinee Taib (substituted off) 72'; Mohd Amri Yahyah (substituted on) 72'; Gary Steven Robbat (substituted on) 88'	Stadium: Perak Stadium; Attendance: 26,000; Referee: Khairulazuan Bin Kidam; Man of the Match: Jorge Pereyra Díaz (Johor Darul Ta'zim)

16 August 2016 18	Johor Darul Ta'zim	4–0	(Malaysia) PDRM	Johor Bahru
21:00 (UTC+8)	Juan Martín Lucero 6' 85'; Jorge Pereyra Díaz 11' 45+1'; Hariss Harun (yellow card) 40' (substituted off) 74'; Azamuddin Akil (yellow card) 61' (substituted off) 73'; S. Chanturu (substituted on) 73'; Mohd Amirul Hadi Zainal (substituted on) 74'; Mohd Azinee Taib (substituted off) 84'; Mohd Amri Yahyah (substituted on) 84'	(HT 3–0)	Fauzi Abdul Majid (yellow card) 17' (substituted off) 72'; Syauki Abdul Wahab (yellow card) 34'; Abdul Latiff Suhaimi (yellow card) 57' (substituted off) 89'; Christopher Keli (substituted off) 59'; Fakrul Aiman Sidid (substituted on) 59'; Guilherme de Paula (substituted on) 72'; Lot Abu Hassan (substituted on) 89'	Stadium: Larkin Stadium; Attendance: 7,780; Referee: Tan Hee Loon; Man of the Match: Juan Martín Lucero (Johor Darul Ta'zim)

24 August 2016 19	FELDA United (Kuala Lumpur)	2–3	Johor Darul Ta'zim	Jengka
21:00 (UTC+8)	Ahmad Syamim Yahya (yellow card) 9' (substituted off) 69'; Mohd Syahid Zaidon 38'; Hadin Azman 44'; Norfazly Alias (red card); Mohd Ridzuan Abdunloh (substituted on) 69'; Gilberto Alemao (yellow card) 79'	(HT 2–2)	Mohd Azinee Taib (substituted off) 14'; Mohd Amri Yahyah (substituted on) 14' (goal) 30' (yellow card) 81'; Jorge Pereyra Díaz (yellow card) 24'; Juan Martín Lucero 36' pen Hariss Harun (yellow card) 45'; Aidil Zafuan 59' (substituted off) 90+4'; Muhammad Fazly Mazlan (substituted off) 85'; Mohd Azrif Nasrulhaq (substituted on) 85'; Mohd Amirul Hadi Zainal (substituted on) 90+4'	Stadium: Tun Abdul Razak Stadium; Attendance: 16,640; Referee: Mohd Fairuzi Mat Desa

9 September 2016 20	Johor Darul Ta'zim	3–0	Terengganu	Johor Bahru
21:00 (UTC+8)	Jorge Pereyra Díaz 29' pen 86'; S. Kunanlan (yellow card) 57'; Marcos Antonio (yellow card) 64'; Mohd Amirul Hadi Zainal (substituted off) 65'; Gary Steven Robbat (substituted on) 65'; Safiq Rahim 82'; Azamuddin Akil (substituted off) 87'; S. Chanturu (substituted on) 87'; Mohd Amri Yahyah (substituted off) 90'; Mohd Shakir Shaari (substituted on) 90'	(HT 1–0)	Issey Nakajima-Farran (yellow card) 50'; Joseph Kalang Tie (substituted off) 74'; Ahmad Nordin Alias (substituted on) 74'; Bogdan Milic (substituted off) 75'; Hairuddin Omar (substituted on) 75'; Mohd Fakhrurazi Musa (substituted off) 90+1'; Yong Kuong Yong (substituted on) 90+1'	Stadium: Larkin Stadium; Attendance: 24,220; Referee: Teoh Hee Loon

24 September 2016 21	Johor Darul Ta'zim	5–1	(Terengganu) T–Team	Johor Bahru
21:00 (UTC+8)	Mohd Amirul Hadi Zainal 6'; Juan Martín Lucero 26' 34' 60'; Abdoulaye Maiga 45+2' o.g. Gary Steven Robbat (yellow card) 52'; Fazly Mazlan (substituted off) 68'; Hasbullah Abu Bakar (substituted on) 68'; Amri Yahyah (substituted off) 71'; Safee Sali (substituted on) 71'; Marcos Antonio (substituted off) 83'; Shakir Shaari (substituted on) 83'	(HT 4–1)	Patrick Cruz 44'; Dilshod Sharofetdinov (substituted off) 55'; Mohd Asrol Ibrahim (substituted on) 55'; Ahmad Takhiyuddin Roslan (substituted off) 76'; Muhd Zulhanizam Shafine (substituted on) 76'; Kamal Azizi Zabri (substituted off) 84'; Abdullah Suleiman (substituted on) 84'	Stadium: Larkin Stadium; Attendance: 24,280; Referee: Zulkifli Ahmad

22 October 2016 22	Selangor	1–2	Johor Darul Ta'zim	Shah Alam
21:00 (UTC+8)	Muhd Faizzudin Muhd Abidin (substituted off) 37'; Andik Vermansyah (substituted on) 37'; Mohd Rizal Fahmi Abdul Rosid (substituted off) 48'; S. Veenod (substituted on) 48'; Mauro Olivi (substituted off) 66'; Ahmad Hazwan Bakri (substituted on) 66' (goal) 71'; Mohd Hafiz Kamal (yellow card) 83'; Mohd Raimi Mohd Nor (yellow card) 85'	(HT 0–0)	Mohd Azinee Taib (substituted off) 29'; Azamuddin Akil (substituted off) 61'; S. Chanturu (substituted on) 61'; Jorge Pereyra Díaz 64' (yellow card) 82'; Mohd Amri Yahyah (substituted on) 29' (yellow card) 50' (goal) 77'; Hariss Harun (substituted off) 76'; Safiq Rahim (substituted on) 76'; Junior Eldstal (yellow card) 78'	Stadium: Shah Alam Stadium; Attendance: 8,929; Referee: Muhd Nazmi Nasaruddin

=== Malaysia FA Cup ===
19 February 2016 2nd round	UiTM (Selangor)	0–5	Johor Darul Ta'zim	Shah Alam, Selangor
16:15 (UTC+8)	Anwarul Hafiz Ahmad (substituted off) 41'; Mohd Adib Zainuddin (substituted on) 41'; Mohd Adib Zainuddin (yellow card) 42'; Ahmad Zakwan (substituted off) 55'; Syahrizan Shukor (substituted on) 55'; Khairul Akhyar Husain (substituted off) 78'; Syafiq Mokhtar (substituted on) 78'; Muhd Zulkhairi Zulkeply (yellow card) 85'	(HT 0–4)	Mohd Amri Yahyah 13'; S. Chanturu 32', 36'; Mohd Amirul Hadi Zainal 45'; Safee Sali (substituted off) 45+1'; Jorge Pereyra Díaz (substituted on) 45+1'; Mohd Azinee Taib (substituted off) 54'; Mohd Safiq Rahim (substituted on) 54'; Marcos Antonio (substituted off) 65'; Juan Martín Lucero (substituted on) 65'; Jorge Pereyra Díaz 71'; Juan Martín Lucero (penalty missed); Mohd Amirul Hadi Zainal (red card)	Stadium: UiTM Stadium; Attendance: 2,900; Referee: Khairul Rizal Ismail; Man of the Match: Mohd Amri Yahyah (Johor Darul Ta'zim)

4 March 2016 3rd round	Johor Darul Ta'zim	4–1	Negeri Sembilan	Johor Bahru, Johor
21:00 (UTC+8)	Mohd Azinee Taib 5'; Mohd Amri Yahyah 10' (pen); Azamuddin Akil (substituted off) 52'; Jorge Pereyra Díaz (substituted on) 52'; Gary Steven Robbat (substituted off) 63'; Safiq Rahim (substituted on) 63'; Jorge Pereyra Díaz 65', 90+2'; Mohd Amer Saidin (substituted off) 74'; Aidil Zafuan (substituted on) 74'	(HT 2–0)	Sabri Sahar (yellow card) 10'; Sabri Sahar (substituted off) 61'; Nizam Ruslan (substituted on) 61'; Mohd Shazlan Alias (substituted off) 66'; Hariri Mohd Safii (substituted on) 66'; Andrew Nabbout 66'; Mohd Norhafizzuan Jailani (substituted off) 83'; N. Thanabalan (substituted on) 83'	Stadium: Larkin Stadium; Attendance: 21,430; Man of the Match: Mohd Izham Tarmizi (Johor Darul Ta'zim)

19 March 2016 Quarter-final (1st leg)	PDRM (Malaysia)	0–1	Johor Darul Ta'zim	Krubong, Malacca
21:00 (UTC+8)	Ahmad Nizam Rodzi (yellow card) 40'; Andrezinho (substituted off) 63'; Amir Saiful Baderli (substituted on) 63'; Khairul Izuan Abdullah (substituted off) 67'; Christopher Keli (substituted on) 67'; Hazsyafiq Hamzah (substituted off) 74'; Abdul Latiff Suhaimi (substituted on) 74'	(HT 0–1)	Juan Martín Lucero 18' pen Mohd Azinee Taib (substituted off) 46'; S. Chanturu (substituted on) 46'; Azamuddin Akil (substituted off) 73'; Mohd Amirul Hadi Zainal (substituted on) 73'; Jorge Pereyra Díaz (substituted off) 87'; Mohd Amri Yahyah (substituted on) 87'	Stadium: Hang Jebat Stadium; Referee: Mohd Zohri Tajuddin; Man of the Match: Mohd Azniee Taib (Johor Darul Ta'zim)

2 April 2016 Quarter-final (2nd leg)	Johor Darul Ta'zim	5–2 (6–2 agg.)	(Malaysia) PDRM	Johor Bahru, Johor
21:00 (UTC+8)	Jorge Pereyra Díaz 15', 28'; Safiq Rahim 40' pen Mohd Azinee Taib 42'; Jorge Pereyra Díaz (substituted off) 53'; Hariss Harun (substituted on) 53'; Azamuddin Akil (substituted off) 60'; S. Chanturu (substituted on) 60'; Marcos Antonio (yellow card) 62'; Juan Martín Lucero 66'; Safiq Rahim (substituted off) 72'; Gary Steven Robbat (substituted on) 72'	(HT 4–0)	K. Reuben (yellow card) 12'; Abdul Latiff Suhaimi (substituted off) 38'; Christopher Keli (substituted on) 38'; Andrezinho 49'; Amir Saiful Badeli (substituted off) 62'; Safwan Hasyim (substituted on) 62'; Ahmad Nizam Rodzi 63'; Fekry Tajudin (substituted off) 70'; Azrul Azman (substituted on) 70'; Andrezinho (yellow card) 76'	Stadium: Larkin Stadium; Attendance: 22,680; Referee: Zulkifli Ahmad

16 April 2016 Semi-final (1st leg)	Kedah	2–1	Johor Darul Ta'zim	Alor Setar, Kedah
21:00 (UTC+8)	Baddrol Bakhtiar (yellow card) 8'; Farhan Roslan 14'; Khairul Helmi Johari (yellow card) 29'; Sandro 45'; Amirul Hisyam (yellow card) 62'; Sandro (substituted off) 73'; Syazwan Tajuddin (substituted on) 73'; Kahê (substituted off) 79'; Ahmad Fakri Saarani (substituted on) 79'; Baddrol Bakhtiar (substituted off) 89'; Syafiq Ahmad (substituted on) 89'; Liridon Krasniqi (yellow card) 90+5'	(HT 2–1)	Hariss Harun (yellow card) 10'; Juan Martín Lucero 27'; Fazly Mazlan (yellow card) 32'; Azamuddin Akil (substituted off) 46'; Mohd Azinee Taib (substituted on) 46'; Mohd Amri Yahyah (substituted off) 58'; Mohd Amirul Hadi Zainal (substituted on) 58'; S. Kunanlan (yellow card) 63'; Hariss Harun (substituted off) 82'; Safee Sali (substituted on) 82'	Stadium: Darulaman Stadium; Attendance: 23,400; Referee: Sittharanjanan; Man of the Match: Farhan Roslan (Kedah FA)

30 April 2016 Semi-final (2nd leg)	Johor Darul Ta'zim	3–1 (4–3 agg.)	Kedah	Johor Bahru, Johor
21:00 (UTC+8)	Jorge Pereyra Díaz 23', 89' (yellow card) 90+2'; Juan Martín Lucero 54'; Mohd Azniee Taib (substituted off) 67'; Amirul Hadi Zainal (substituted on) 67'; Azamuddin Akil (substituted off) 76'; S. Chanturu (substituted on) 76'; Hariss Harun (substituted off) 79'; Mohd Amri Yahyah (substituted on) 79'; Fazly Mazlan (yellow card) 84'	(HT 1–0)	Syazwan Tajuddin (substituted off) 15'; Osman Yusof (substituted on) 15'; Bang Seung-hwan (yellow card) 20'; Amar Rohidan (substituted off) 59'; Ahmad Fakri Saarani (substituted on) 59' (goal) 68'; Muhammad Farhan Roslan (yellow card) 90+1'	Stadium: Larkin Stadium; Attendance: 25,163; Referee: Syed Azhar Syed Kamar; Man of the Match: Jorge Pereyra Díaz (Johor Darul Ta'zim)

14 May 2016 Final	Johor Darul Ta'zim	2–1	(Selangor) PKNS	Shah Alam, Selangor
21:00 (UTC+8)	Safiq Rahim 15' pen Jorge Pereyra Díaz 35'; Jorge Pereyra Díaz (yellow card) 45+3'; Azamuddin Akil (substituted off) 59'; Amirul Hadi Zainal (substituted on) 59'; Mohd Azniee Taib (yellow card) 74'; Mohd Azniee Taib (substituted off) 76'; Mohd Amri Yahyah (substituted on) 76'; Marcos Antonio (yellow card) 77'; Juan Martín Lucero (yellow card) 90'	(HT 2–1)	Gabriel Guerra 4' pen G. Jeevananthan (yellow card) 14'; M. Sivakumar (substituted off) 46'; Shahurain Abu Samah (substituted on) 46'; Nazrin Syamsul Bahri (yellow card) 62'; Nazrin Syamsul Bahri (substituted off) 70'; S. Thinagaran (substituted on) 70'; P. Gunalan (yellow card) 83'; Khairu Azrin (yellow card) 90+1'; Matías Jadue (yellow card) 90+3'	Stadium: Shah Alam Stadium; Attendance: 75,000; Referee: Syed Azhar Syed Kamar; Man of the Match: Jorge Pereyra Díaz (Johor Darul Ta'zim)

=== Malaysia Cup ===
==== Group stage ====
Pos	Team	Pld	W	D	L	GF	GA	GD	Pts	Qualification	POL	PKN	PRK	JDT
1	(Malaysia) PDRM	6	3	1	2	8	9	−1	10	Advance to knockout phase	—	0–1	2–1	1–1
2	(Selangor) PKNS	6	2	2	2	8	10	−2	8	Advance to knockout phase	1–2	—	2–1	1–1
3	Perak	6	2	1	3	11	8	+3	7		1–2	4–1	—	3–0
4	Johor Darul Ta'zim	6	1	4	1	9	9	0	7		4–1	2–2	1–1	—

Updated to match(es) played on 20 August 2016. Source: FAM FMLLP

12 July 2016 Group stage	Johor Darul Ta'zim	2–2	(Selangor) PKNS	Johor Bahru, Johor
21:00 UTC+8	Gary Steven Robbat (yellow card) 22' (substituted off) 62'; Safee Sali 47' (substituted off) 52'; Juan Martín Lucero (substituted on) 52' (goal) 56' (yellow card) 89'; Hariss Harun (substituted on) 62'; Jorge Pereyra Díaz (substituted off) 73'; Safiq Rahim (substituted on) 73'	(HT 0–0)	P. Gunalan (yellow card) 30' (substituted off) 37'; Mohd Farid Ramli (substituted on) 37'; Shahurain Abu Samah (substituted off) 62'; Khairul Ramadhan Zauwawi (substituted on) 62'; Muhd Khairu Azrin Khazali (substituted off) 78'; Alif Haikal Sabri (substituted on) 78'; Gabriel Guerra 81'; Juan Manuel Cobelli 89' pen	Stadium: Larkin Stadium; Attendance: 7,430; Referee: Zulkifli Bin Ahmad

19 July 2016 Group stage	PDRM (Malaysia)	1–1	Johor Darul Ta'zim	Krubong, Malacca
21:00 UTC+8	Hazsyafiq Hamzah (substituted off) 62'; Christopher Keli (substituted on) 62'; K. Reuben (substituted off) 76'; Muhamad Afzal Nazri (substituted on) 76'; Muhd Eskandar Ismail (substituted off) 83'; Muhd Syauki Abdul Wahab (substituted on) 83'; Safuwan Baharudin 90+2'	(HT 0–0)	Mohd Azniee Taib (yellow card) 39' (substituted off) 46'; Nazrin Nawi (substituted on) 46'; Safiq Rahim (substituted off) 46'; Amirul Hadi Zainal (substituted on) 46'; Hariss Harun (substituted off) 46'; Gary Steven Robbat (substituted on) 46'; K. Reuben 71' o.g.	Stadium: Hang Jebat Stadium; Attendance: 3,800; Referee: Teoh Hee Loon

30 July 2016 Group stage	Perak	3–0	Johor Darul Ta'zim	Ipoh, Perak
21:00 UTC+8	Xhevahir Sukaj 15' (substituted off) 50'; Fazrul Hazli Kadri 42' 66'; Mohd Fikri Sudin (substituted on) 50'; Thiago Junior (yellow card) 61'; D. Kenny Pallraj (substituted off) 74'; Irfan Ghani (substituted on) 74'	(HT 2–0)	Hasbullah Abu Bakar (yellow card) 48' (substituted off) 58'; Fazly Mazlan (substituted on) 58'; Nazrin Nawi (substituted off) 59'; Mohd Azinee Taib (substituted on) 59'; S. Chanturu (red card); Mohd Amirul Hadi Zainal (substituted off) 70'; Gary Steven Robbat (substituted on) 70'; Shakir Shaari (yellow card) 75'; Safee Sali (yellow card) 79'	Stadium: Perak Stadium; Attendance: 23,000; Referee: Mohd Zamzaidi Katimin

10 August 2016 Group stage	Johor Darul Ta'zim	1–1	Perak	Johor Bahru, Johor
21:00 UTC+8	Safiq Rahim (yellow card) 2' (goal) 15' pen Azamuddin Akil (yellow card) 22'; Juan Martín Lucero (substituted off) 46'; Safee Sali (substituted on) 46'; Mohd Amirul Hadi Zainal (yellow card) 48' (substituted off) 90+1'; Mohd Azinee Taib (substituted off) 67'; Mohd Amri Yahyah (substituted on) 67'; Mohd Shakir Shaari (substituted on) 90+1'	(HT 1–1)	Oybek Kilichev 3' (yellow card) 30'; Shahrul Saad (yellow card) 16'; Mohd Hafiz Ramdan (substituted off) 34'; Mohd Nor Hakim Isa (substituted on) 34'; Thiago Junior (yellow card) 43'; Nasir Basharuddin (substituted off) 46'; Tuah Iskandar (substituted on) 46'; Mohd Fikri Sudin (substituted off) 87'; Ahmad Khairil Anuar (substituted on) 87'	Stadium: Larkin Stadium; Attendance: 20,675; Referee: Suhaimi Bin Mat Hassan

13 August 2016 Group stage	Johor Darul Ta'zim	4–1	(Malaysia) PDRM	Johor Bahru, Johor
21:00 UTC+8	Mohd Amri Yahyah 24' 29'; S. Kunanlan (substituted off) 46'; Hasbullah Abu Bakar (substituted on) 46'; Hariss Harun (substituted off) 46'; Safiq Rahim (substituted on) 46'; Nazrin Nawi 52' 60'; Dominic Tan (substituted off) 59'; Fadhli Shas (substituted on) 59'	(HT 2–1)	K. Reuben (yellow card) 38'; Guilherme de Paula 45+2'; Azrul Azman (substituted off) 57'; Haziq Fikri Hussein (substituted on) 57'; Hazsyafiq Hamzah (substituted off) 57'; Fauzi Abdul Majid (substituted on) 57'; Lot Abu Hassan (substituted off) 84'; Muhd Afzal Nazri (substituted on) 84'	Stadium: Larkin Stadium; Attendance: 10,220; Referee: Zulkifli Ahmad; Man of the Match: Mohd Amri Yahyah (Johor Darul Ta'zim)

20 August 2016 Group stage	PKNS (Selangor)	1–1	Johor Darul Ta'zim	Shah Alam, Selangor
21:00 UTC+8	Matias Jadue 2' (yellow card) 40'; Juan Manuel Cobelli (yellow card) 48'; Mohd Azreen Zulkafli (substituted off) 65'; M. Sivakumar (substituted on) 65'; Munir Amran (substituted off) 68'; Khairul Azrin Khazali (substituted on) 68'; Shahurain Abu Samah (substituted off) 80'; Alif Haikal Sabri (substituted on) 80'; Nor Haziq Aris (yellow card) 90+3'	(HT 1–1)	Safee Sali (yellow card) 40' (goal) 41'; Mohd Amirul Hadi Zainal (substituted off) 60'; Gary Steven Robbat (substituted on) 60'; Nazrin Nawi (substituted off) 67'; Safiq Rahim (substituted on) 67'; S. Chanturu (substituted off) 67'; Mohd Azinee Taib (substituted on) 67'	Stadium: Shah Alam Stadium; Attendance: 3,236; Referee: Saiful Mohd Radzali

=== AFC Champions League ===
==== Qualifying play-off ====
2 February 2016 Preliminary round 2	Muangthong United (Thailand)	0–0 (a.e.t.) (3–0 p)	(Malaysia) Johor Darul Ta'zim	Nonthaburi, Thailand
19:30 (UTC+7)	Peeradon Chamratsamee (yellow card) 114'; Cleiton Silva (yellow card) 120'	Report	Jorge Pereyra Díaz (yellow card) 30'; S. Kunanlan (yellow card) 41'; Safee Sali (yellow card) 87'; Marcos Antonio (yellow card) 90'; Mohd Amri Yahyah (yellow card) 115'	Stadium: Thunderdome Stadium; Attendance: 11,446; Referee: Kim Sang-woo; Man of the Match: Kawin Thamsatchanan (Muangthong United)
	Penalties
	(penalty scored) Cleiton Silva; (penalty scored) Peerapat Notchaiya; (penalty scored) Sarach Yooyen		(penalty missed) Jorge Pereyra Díaz; (penalty missed) Marcos Antonio; (penalty missed) Hariss Harun

=== AFC Cup ===
==== Group stage ====
Pos	Team	Pld	W	D	L	GF	GA	GD	Pts	Qualification	JDT	BFC	AYE	LAO
1	(Malaysia) Johor Darul Ta'zim	6	6	0	0	21	3	+18	18	Knockout stage	—	3–0	8–1	3–0
2	(India) Bengaluru	6	3	0	3	9	10	−1	9	Knockout stage	0–1	—	5–3	2–1
3	(Myanmar) Ayeyawady United	6	2	0	4	12	20	−8	6		1–2	0–1	—	4–2
4	(Laos) Lao Toyota	6	1	0	5	8	17	−9	3		1–4	2–1	2–3	—

Source: AFC
Rules for classification: Group stage tiebreakers

24 February 2016 1	Johor Darul Ta'zim (Malaysia)	8–1	(Myanmar) Ayeyawady	Johor Bahru
21:00 (UTC+8)	Mohd Safiq Rahim 5', 48', 62'; Jorge Pereyra Díaz 13'; Marcos Antonio 31'; Nazrin Nawi (substituted off) 59'; Gary Steven Robbat (substituted on) 59'; Mahali Jasuli (substituted off) 61'; Mohd Azinee Taib (substituted on) 61'; Jorge Pereyra Díaz (substituted off) 71'; Mohd Amri Yahyah (substituted on) 71'; Juan Martín Lucero 81', 86'; Aidil Zafuan 89'	(HT 3–1)	Thiha Zaw 7'; Hanson Samuel (yellow card) 18'; Phyo Ko Ko Thein (yellow card) 87'; Naing Lin Tun (yellow card) 89'	Stadium: Larkin Stadium; Attendance: 11,560; Referee: Ng Chiu Kok (Hong Kong); Man of the Match: Mohd Safiq Rahim (Johor Darul Ta'zim)

9 March 2016 2	Bengaluru FC (India)	0–1	(Malaysia) Johor Darul Ta'zim	Bengaluru
19:30 (UTC+5)	Vishal Kumar (substituted off) 69'; Rino Anto (substituted on) 69'; Seminlen Doungel (substituted off) 69'; Daniel Lalhlimpuia (substituted on) 69'; Thoi Singh (substituted off) 71'; Alwyn George (substituted on) 71'	(HT 0–0)	Azamuddin Akil (yellow card) 49'; Safiq Rahim 55'; Azamuddin Akil (substituted off) 77'; S. Chanturu (substituted on) 77'; Juan Martín Lucero (substituted off) 83'; Jasazrin Jamaluddin (substituted on) 83'; Mohd Amirul Hadi Zainal (substituted off) 89'; Gary Steven Robbat (substituted on) 89'	Stadium: Sree Kanteerava Stadium; Attendance: 2,792; Referee: Hussein Abo Yehia (Lebanon); Man of the Match: Mohd Safiq Rahim (Johor Darul Ta'zim)

16 March 2016 3	Johor Darul Ta'zim (Malaysia)	3–0	(Laos) Lao Toyota	Johor Bahru
21:00 (UTC+8)	S. Kunanlan (yellow card) 34'; Nazrin Nawi (substituted off) 54'; Jorge Pereyra Díaz (substituted on) 54'; Fazly Mazlan (substituted off) 56'; Safiq Rahim (substituted on) 56'; Safiq Rahim 63' pen, 70' pen S. Kunanlan (red card); Safee Sali (substituted off) 72'; Mahali Jasuli (substituted on) 72'; Mohd Amri Yahyah 90+1'	(HT 0–0)	Takahiro Saito (red card); Itsuki Yamada (substituted off) 64'; Thanthong Phonsettha (substituted on) 64'; Kazuo Homma (substituted off) 67'; Sitthideth Khanthavong (substituted on) 67'; Phatthana Syvilay (yellow card) 73'; Maitee Sihalad (substituted off) 80'; Bounthavy Sipasong (substituted on) 80'	Stadium: Larkin Stadium; Attendance: 16,860; Referee: Hanna Hattab (Syria); Man of the Match: Mohd Safiq Rahim (Johor Darul Ta'zim)

13 April 2016 4	Lao Toyota (Laos)	1–4	(Malaysia) Johor Darul Ta'zim	Vientiane
19:30 (UTC+5)	Phatthana Syvilay 42'; Itsuki Yamada (substituted off) 57'; Maitee Sihalad (substituted on) 57'; Renshi Yamaguchi (substituted off) 63'; Phoutdavy Phommasane (substituted on) 63'; Saynakhonevieng Phommapanya (substituted off) 80'; Bounthavy Sipasong (substituted on) 80'	(HT 1–0)	Safee Sali 47' pen Mohd Azinee Taib (substituted off) 55'; Jorge Pereyra Díaz (substituted on) 55'; Mohd Shakir Shaari (substituted off) 61'; Mohd Amirul Hadi Zainal (substituted on) 61'; Fadhli Shas 65'; Mahali Jasuli (yellow card) 71'; Mohd Amri Yahyah 78'; Safee Sali (substituted off) 78'; Juan Martín Lucero (substituted on) 78'; Jorge Pereyra Díaz 82'	Stadium: New Laos National Stadium; Attendance: 200; Referee: Kurbanov Charymurat (Turkmenistan); Man of the Match: Gary Steven Robbat (Johor Darul Ta'zim)

27 April 2016 5	Ayeyawady (Myanmar)	1–2	(Malaysia) Johor Darul Ta'zim	Pathein
19:30 (UTC+5)	Thiha Zaw 26'; Thein Naing Oo (substituted off) 75'; Naing Lin Tun (substituted on) 75'; Naing Lin Oo (substituted off) 82'; Arkar Naing (substituted on) 82'	(HT 1–1)	Mohd Amirul Hadi Zainal 30'; Nazrin Nawi (substituted off) 58'; Muhammad Akram Mahinan (substituted on) 58'; Mohd Amer Saidin (substituted off) 64'; Mahali Jasuli (substituted on) 64'; S. Chanturu (substituted off) 70'; Azamuddin Akil (substituted on) 70'; Safee Sali 86'	Stadium: Kyaut Tie Stadium; Attendance: 207; Referee: Khurram Shahzad (Pakistan); Man of the Match: Mohd Amirul Hadi Zainal (Johor Darul Ta'zim)

11 May 2016 6	Johor Darul Ta'zim (Malaysia)	3–0	(India) Bengaluru FC	Johor Bahru
21:00 (UTC+8)	Nazrin Nawi (yellow card) 26'; Mohd Amri Yahyah (substituted off) 59'; Safiq Rahim (substituted on) 59'; Nazrin Nawi (substituted off) 63'; S. Chanturu (substituted on) 63'; Safiq Rahim 70'; Safee Sali 78'; Mahali Jasuli (substituted off) 81'; Muhammad Akram Mahinan (substituted on) 81'; Mohd Shakir Shaari 90+1' pen	(HT 0–0)	Kim Song-Yong (yellow card) 32'; Eugeneson Lyngdoh (yellow card) 36'; Curtis Osano (yellow card) 44'; Thoi Singh (yellow card) 51'; Sunil Chhetri (substituted off) 73'; Seminlen Doungel (substituted on) 73'; Thoi Singh (substituted off) 73'; Daniel Lalhlimpuia (substituted on) 73'; John Johnson (substituted off) 89'; Salam Ranjan Singh (substituted on) 89'; Rino Anto (yellow card) 90'	Stadium: Larkin Stadium; Attendance: 6,545; Referee: Turki Mohammed A Khudhayr (Saudi Arabia); Man of the Match: Safee Sali (Johor Darul Ta'zim)

==== Round of 16 ====
25 May 2016 Round of 16	Johor Darul Ta'zim (Malaysia)	7–2	(Philippines) Kaya	Johor Bahru
21:00 (UTC+8)	Juan Martín Lucero 15', 54', 70'; Jorge Pereyra Díaz 23' pen Azamuddin Akil 33', 40', (substituted off) 61'; Mohd Amri Yahyah (substituted off) 58'; Mahali Jasuli (substituted on) 58', (goal) 69'; S. Chanturu (substituted on) 61'; Mohd Amirul Hadi Zainal (yellow card) 62', (substituted off) 79'; Safee Sali (substituted on) 79'	(HT 4–0)	Miguel Tanton (yellow card) 36'; OJ Porteria 53'; Alfred Osei (substituted off) 64'; Julian Matthews (substituted on) 64'; Jovin Bedic (substituted off) 73'; Sean Patrick Kane (substituted on) 73'; Kenshiro Daniels (substituted off) 83'; Charlie Beaton (substituted on) 83'; Anton Ugarte 88'	Stadium: Larkin Stadium; Attendance: 17,322; Referee: Fahad Jaber Al-Marri (Qatar); Man of the Match: Juan Martín Lucero (Johor Darul Ta'zim)

==== Quarter-final ====
13 Sept. 2016 Quarter-final 1st leg	South China (Hong Kong)	1–1	(Malaysia) Johor Darul Ta'zim	Hong Kong
20:00 (UTC+8)	Ryan Griffiths (substituted off) 46'; Chan Siu Ki (substituted on) 46'; Lo Kong Wai (substituted off) 54'; Law Hiu Chung (substituted on) 54'; Leung Kwun Chung (yellow card) 79'; Chan Siu Kwan (substituted off) 81'; Lam Hok Hei (substituted on) 81'; Nikola Komazec 90+3'	(HT 1–0)	Jorge Pereyra Díaz 22' (yellow card) 79'; Azamuddin Akil (yellow card) 29' (substituted off) 84'; Aidil Zafuan (yellow card) 30'; S. Kunanlan (yellow card) 63'; Mohd Azinee Taib (substituted off) 64'; Mohd Amri Yahyah (substituted on) 64'; Juan Martín Lucero (yellow card) 65'; Muhammad Fazly Mazlan (substituted off) 77'; Mohd Azrif Nasrulhaq (substituted on) 77'; Mohd Amirul Hadi Zainal (substituted on) 84'	Stadium: Mong Kok Stadium, Hong Kong; Attendance: 3,938; Referee: Ali Sabah Al-Qaysi (Iraq); Man of the Match: Nikola Komazec (South China)

20 Sept. 2016 Quarter-final 2nd leg	Johor Darul Ta'zim (Malaysia)	2–1 (3–2 agg.)	(Hong Kong) South China	Johor Bahru
20:45 (UTC+8)	S. Kunanlan (substituted off) 36'; Mohd Azrif Nasrulhaq (substituted on) 36' (yellow card) 67'; Safiq Rahim (yellow card) 38' (penalty missed); Juan Martín Lucero 57'; Azamuddin Akil (substituted off) 71'; Gary Steven Robbat (substituted on) 71'; Mohd Azinee Taib (substituted off) 86'; Mohd Amri Yahyah (substituted on) 86' (yellow card) 89'; Jorge Pereyra Díaz 87'	(HT 0–0)	Chan Wai Ho (yellow card) 30'; Wisdom Fofo Agbo (substituted off) 52'; Lo Kong Wai (substituted on) 52'; Chan Siu Kwan (substituted off) 62'; Lam Hok Hei (substituted on) 62'; Chan Siu Ki (substituted off) 71'; Ryan Griffiths (substituted on) 71'; Law Hiu Chung (yellow card) 90+3'; Nikola Komazec 90+4'	Stadium: Larkin Stadium, Johor Bahru; Attendance: 17,350; Referee: Tantashev Ilgiz (Uzbekistan); Man of the Match: Jorge Pereyra Díaz (Johor Darul Ta'zim)

==== Semi-final ====
28 Sept. 2016 Semi-final 1st leg	Johor Darul Ta'zim (Malaysia)	1–1	(India) Bengaluru FC	Johor Bahru
20:45 (UTC+8)	Marcos Antonio (yellow card) 33'; Jorge Pereyra Díaz 52' (yellow card) 54'; Mohd Azinee Taib (substituted off) 68'; S. Chanturu (substituted on) 68'; Azamuddin Akil (substituted off) 75'; Mohd Amri Yahyah (substituted on) 75' (yellow card) 76'; Juan Martín Lucero (yellow card) 80'; Safiq Rahim (substituted off) 84'; Mohd Amirul Hadi Zainal (substituted on) 84'	(HT 0–0); Report:	Salam Ranjan Singh (yellow card) 45'; Juanan (yellow card) 54'; Eugeneson Lyngdoh 57' (substituted off) 90'; Alwyn George (substituted off) 69'; Vishal Kumar (substituted on) 69'; C.K. Vineeth (substituted off) 75'; Daniel Lalhlimpuia (substituted on) 75'; Beikhokhei Beingaichho (substituted on) 90'	Stadium: Larkin Stadium, Johor Bahru; Attendance: 18,000; Referee: Adham Mohammad Makhadmeh (Jordan)

19 Oct. 2016 Semi-final 2nd leg	Bengaluru FC (India)	3–1 (4–2 agg.)	(Malaysia) Johor Darul Ta'zim	Karnataka
20:00 (UTC+8)	Sunil Chhetri 41' 67' (substituted off) 79'; Eugeneson Lyngdoh (yellow card) 75' (substituted off) 87'; C.K. Vineeth (yellow card) 73'; Juan Antonio 76'; Alvaro Rubio (yellow card) 77'; Keegan Pereira (substituted on) 79'; Seminlen Doungel (substituted on) 87'; Salam Ranjan Singh (substituted on) 89'; Nishu Kumar (substituted off) 89'; Amrinder Singh (yellow card) 90'	(HT 1–1); Report:	Safiq Rahim 11'; Marcos Antonio (yellow card) 25'; Amirul Hadi Zainal (substituted off) 62'; Gary Steven Robbat (substituted on) 62' (yellow card) 77'; Mohd Azrif Nasrulhaq (substituted off) 68'; Mohd Azinee Taib (substituted on) 68'; Azamuddin Akil (substituted off) 82'; Junior Eldstal (substituted on) 82'	Stadium: Sree Kanteerava Stadium, Bangalore; Attendance: 21,379; Referee: Ali Hasan Ebrahim Abdulnabi (Bahrain)

== Club statistics ==
=== Appearances, and goals scored ===
No.	Pos	Nat	Player	Total		Super League (Note: Including the Charity Shield)		FA Cup		Malaysia Cup		Asia (Note: Including the Champions League and AFC Cup)			
No.	Pos	Nat	Player	Apps	Goals	Apps	Goals	Apps	Goals	Apps	Goals	Apps	Goals		
1	GK	(Malaysia) MAS	Farizal Marlias	8	0	5	0	1	0	0	0	2	0		
22	GK	(Malaysia) MAS	K. Sasi Kumar	0	0	0	0	0	0	0	0	0	0		
24	GK	(Malaysia) MAS	Izham Tarmizi	4	0	0	0	2	0	0	0	2	0		
4	DF	(Malaysia) MAS	Asraruddin Putra	0	0	0	0	0	0	0	0	0	0		
6	DF	(Brazil) BRA	Marcos António (3rd captain)	11	1	5	0	2	0	0	0	4	1		
7	DF	(Malaysia) MAS	Aidil Zafuan (Vice-captain)	11	1	4	0	2+1	0	0	0	4	1		
15	DF	(Malaysia) MAS	Fazly Mazlan	11	0	5	0	2	0	0	0	4	0		
18	DF	(Malaysia) MAS	Mahali Jasuli	5	0	2	0	0	0	0	0	2+1	0		
26	DF	(Malaysia) MAS	Amer Saidin	1	0	0	0	1	0	0	0	0	0		
27	DF	(Malaysia) MAS	Fadhli Shas	2	0	1	0	1	0	0	0	0	0		
2	MF	(Malaysia) MAS	Azamuddin Akil	5	2	2+1	2	1	0	0	0	0	0	1	0
5	MF	(Malaysia) MAS	Amirul Hadi Zainal	8	1	1+1	0	1+1	1	0	0	4	0		
8	MF	(Malaysia) MAS	Safiq Rahim (Captain)	11	7	3+1	1	1+2	0	0	0	3+1	6		
12	MF	(Malaysia) MAS	S. Kunanlan	12	0	5	0	3	0	0	0	4	0		
13	MF	(Malaysia) MAS	Gary Steven Robbat	6	0	2+1	0	1	0	0	0	0+2	0		
14	MF	(Singapore) SGP	Hariss Harun	8	1	4	1	2	0	0	0	2	0		
16	MF	(Malaysia) MAS	Shakir Shaari	0	0	0	0	0	0	0	0	0	0		
20	MF	(Malaysia) MAS	Nazrin Nawi	5	0	1+2	0	0	0	0	0	2	0		
21	MF	(Malaysia) MAS	Jasazrin Jamaluddin	8	0	1+2	0	2	0	0	0	1+2	0		
23	MF	(Malaysia) MAS	S. Chanturu	7	4	1+2	2	1+1	2	0	0	1+1	0		
25	MF	(Malaysia) MAS	Junior Eldstål	0	0	0	0	0	0	0	0	0	0		
28	MF	(Malaysia) MAS	Azinee Taib	8	1	3	0	3	1	0	0	1+1	0		
29	MF	(Malaysia) MAS	Akram Mahinan	0	0	0	0	0	0	0	0	0	0		
3	FW	(Malaysia) MAS	Rozaimi Abdul Rahman	0	0	0	0	0	0	0	0	0	0		
10	FW	(Malaysia) MAS	Safee Sali	7	0	2+1	0	2	0	0	0	1+1	0		
11	FW	(Argentina) ARG	Jorge Pereyra Díaz	11	8	4+1	4	1+2	3	0	0	3	1		
17	FW	(Malaysia) MAS	Amri Yahyah (4th captain)	9	3	1+1	0	2+1	2	0	0	1+3	1		
19	FW	(Argentina) ARG	Juan Martín Lucero	9	3	3+2	0	1+1	1	0	0	2	2		

Note(s)

=== Top scorers ===
Rnk	Pos	No.	Player	Super League	FA Cup	Malaysia Cup	Asia	Total
1	FW	11	(Argentina) Jorge Pereyra Díaz	18	8	0	6	32
2	FW	19	(Argentina) Juan Martín Lucero	16	4	1	6	27
3	MF	8	(Malaysia) Mohd Safiq Rahim	4	2	1	8	15
4	FW	17	(Malaysia) Mohd Amri Yahyah	2	2	2	2	8
5	FW	10	(Malaysia) Safee Sali	1	0	2	3	6
6	DF	6	(Brazil) Marcos António	4	0	0	1	5
7	MF	23	(Malaysia) S. Chanturu	2	2	0	0	4
8	MF	5	(Malaysia) Amirul Hadi Zainal	2	1	0	1	4
9	FW	28	(Malaysia) Mohd Azinee Taib	1	2	0	0	3
10	MF	2	(Malaysia) Azamuddin Akil	1	0	0	2	3
11	DF	7	(Malaysia) Aidil Zafuan	1	0	0	1	2
12	MF	20	(Malaysia) Nazrin Nawi	0	0	2	0	2
13	MF	14	(Singapore) Hariss Harun	1	0	0	0	1
14	MF	21	(Malaysia) Fazly Mazlan	1	0	0	0	1
15	DF	27	(Malaysia) Fadhli Shas	0	0	0	1	1
16	DF	16	(Malaysia) Shakir Shaari	0	0	0	1	1
17	DF	18	(Malaysia) Mahali Jasuli	0	0	0	1	1
Own goals				2	0	1	0	2
TOTALS				56	21	9	33	119

=== Hat-tricks ===
Player	Competition	Against	Result	Date
(Malaysia) Mohd Safiq Rahim	AFC Cup	Ayeyawady	8 – 1	24 February 2016
(Argentina) Jorge Pereyra Díaz	Malaysia Super League	Pahang	0 – 6	21 May 2016
(Argentina) Juan Martín Lucero	AFC Cup	Kaya F.C.	7 – 2	25 May 2016
(Argentina) Juan Martín Lucero	Malaysia Super League	T-Team FC	5 – 1	24 September 2016

=== Top assists ===
Rnk	Pos	No.	Player	Super League	FA Cup	Malaysia Cup	Asia	Total
1	MF	8	(Malaysia) Safiq Rahim	6	4	1	8	19
2	FW	11	(Argentina) Jorge Pereyra Díaz	6	2	0	5	13
3	FW	19	(Argentina) Juan Martín Lucero	6	2	0	2	10
4	MF	2	(Malaysia) Azamuddin Akil	5	1	0	1	7
5	FW	17	(Malaysia) Mohd Amri Yahyah	3	1	2	0	6
6	MF	23	(Malaysia) S. Chanturu	2	1	1	2	6
7	MF	20	(Malaysia) Nazrin Nawi	2	0	0	0	2
8	DF	6	(Brazil) Marcos Antonio	2	0	0	0	2
9	DF	18	(Malaysia) Mahali Jasuli	2	0	0	0	2
10	MF	28	(Malaysia) Mohd Azinee Taib	0	1	1	0	2
11	MF	21	(Malaysia) Fazly Mazlan	1	0	0	0	1
12	FW	10	(Malaysia) Safee Sali	0	1	0	0	1
13	MF	5	(Malaysia) Amirul Hadi Zainal	0	1	0	0	1
14	MF	16	(Malaysia) S. Kunanlan	0	0	0	1	1
15	MF	25	(Malaysia) Junior Eldstal	0	0	0	1	1
TOTALS				35	14	5	20	74

=== Clean sheets ===
Rnk	No.	Player	Super League	FA Cup	Malaysia Cup	Asia	Total
1	24	(Malaysia) Mohd Izham Tarmizi	6	1	0	2	9
2	1	(Malaysia) Mohd Farizal Marlias	5	0	0	2	7
TOTALS			11	1	0	4	16

=== Discipline ===
==== Cards ====
Rnk	No.	Player	Total			Super League			FA Cup			Malaysia Cup			Asia		
Rnk	No.	Player	Yellow card	(yellow card) (red card)	Red card	Yellow card	(yellow card) (red card)	Red card	Yellow card	(yellow card) (red card)	Red card	Yellow card	(yellow card) (red card)	Red card	Yellow card	(yellow card) (red card)	Red card
1	12	(Malaysia) S. Kunanlan	7	1	0	3	0	0	1	0	0	0	0	0	3	1	0
2	14	(Singapore) Hariss Harun	6	0	0	5	0	0	1	0	0	0	0	0	0	0	0
2	19	(Argentina) Juan Martín Lucero	6	0	0	3	0	0	1	0	0	1	0	0	1	0	0
2	8	(Malaysia) Safiq Rahim	6	0	0	3	0	0	1	0	0	1	0	0	1	0	0
2	11	(Argentina) Jorge Pereyra Díaz	6	0	0	2	0	0	2	0	0	0	0	0	2	0	0
3	6	(Brazil) Marcos António	5	0	0	2	0	0	2	0	0	0	0	0	1	0	0
3	2	(Malaysia) Azamuddin Akil	5	0	0	2	0	0	0	0	0	1	0	0	2	0	0
4	15	(Malaysia) Fazly Mazlan	4	0	0	2	0	0	2	0	0	0	0	0	0	0	0
4	17	(Malaysia) Amri Yahyah	4	0	0	2	0	0	0	0	0	0	0	0	2	0	0
5	5	(Malaysia) Amirul Hadi Zainal	3	0	1	1	0	0	0	0	1	1	0	0	1	0	0
6	18	(Malaysia) Mahali Jasuli	3	0	0	2	0	0	0	0	0	0	0	0	1	0	0
6	25	(Malaysia) Mohd Azinee Taib	3	0	0	1	0	0	1	0	0	1	0	0	0	0	0
6	10	(Malaysia) Safee Sali	3	0	0	0	0	0	0	0	0	2	0	0	1	0	0
7	20	(Malaysia) Nazrin Nawi	2	0	0	1	0	0	0	0	0	0	0	0	1	0	0
7	7	(Malaysia) Aidil Zafuan	2	0	0	1	0	0	0	0	0	0	0	0	1	0	0
7	13	(Malaysia) Gary Steven Robbat	2	0	0	1	0	0	0	0	0	1	0	0	0	0	0
8	23	(Malaysia) S. Chanturu	0	0	1	0	0	0	0	0	0	0	0	1	0	0	0
9	27	(Malaysia) Fadhli Shas	1	0	0	1	0	0	0	0	0	0	0	0	0	0	0
9	24	(Malaysia) Mohd Izham Tarmizi	1	0	0	1	0	0	0	0	0	0	0	0	0	0	0
9	1	(Malaysia) Farizal Marlias	1	0	0	1	0	0	0	0	0	0	0	0	0	0	0
9	26	(Malaysia) Hasbullah Abu Bakar	1	0	0	0	0	0	0	0	0	1	0	0	0	0	0
9	16	(Malaysia) Mohd Shakir Shaari	1	0	0	0	0	0	0	0	0	1	0	0	0	0	0
9	29	(Malaysia) Mohd Azrif Nasrulhaq	1	0	0	0	0	0	0	0	0	1	0	0	1	0	0
Totals			73	1	2	34	0	0	11	0	1	10	0	1	18	1	0

==== Suspensions ====
Player	No. of matches served	Reason	Competition	Date served	Opponent(s)
(Malaysia) Amirul Hadi Zainal	2	Red card vs. UiTM	FA Cup; Super League	4 March 2016 (Cup); 13 March 2016 (League)	Negeri Sembilan; PDRM
(Malaysia) S. Kunanlan	1	Second yellow cards vs. Lao Toyota	AFC Cup	13 April 2016	Lao Toyota

=== Summary ===
Games played	41 (20 Super League) (1 Champions League) (7 FA Cup) (7 AFC Cup) (6 Malaysia Cup)
Games won	30 (16 Super League) (6 FA Cup) (7 AFC Cup) (1 Malaysia Cup)
Games drawn	9 (4 Super League) (1 Champions League) (4 Malaysia Cup)
Games lost	2 (1 FA Cup) (1 Malaysia Cup)
Goals scored	107 (49 Super League) (21 FA Cup) (28 AFC Cup) (9 Malaysia Cup)
Goals conceded	33 (12 Super League) (7 FA Cup) (5 AFC Cup) (9 Malaysia Cup)
Goal difference	+74 (37 Super League) (14 FA Cup) (23 AFC Cup)
Clean sheets	16 (1 Champions League) (11 Super League) (1 FA Cup) (3 AFC Cup)
Yellow cards	64 (33 Super League) (5 Champions League) (11 FA Cup) (5 AFC Cup) (10 Malaysia Cup)
Red cards	2 (1 FA Cup) (1 Malaysia Cup)
Most appearances	12 Appearances (S. Kunanlan)
Top scorer	17 (Jorge Pereyra Díaz)
Winning Percentage	Overall: 30/41 (73.17)

== Home attendance ==
=== Matches (All Competitions) ===
All matches played at Larkin Stadium.

Date	Attendance	Opposition	Score	Competition	Ref
13 February 2016	26,800	Selangor FA	1–1	Malaysia Super League Match Day 1 Charity Shield	
24 February 2016	11,560	Ayeyawady United F.C.	8–1	AFC Cup Group Stage	
1 March 2016	16,582	Felda United F.C.	2–1	Malaysia Super League Match Day 4	
4 March 2016	21,430	Negeri Sembilan FA	4–1	Malaysia FA Cup 3rd round	
16 March 2016	16,860	Lao Toyota F.C.	3–0	AFC Cup Group Stage	
2 April 2016	22,680	PDRM FA	5–2	Malaysia FA Cup Quarter-final 2nd Leg	
5 April 2016	20,357	Perak FA	2–1	Malaysia Super League Match Day 6	
20 April 2016	13,860	Sarawak FA	5–2	Malaysia Super League Match Day 8	
30 April 2016	25,163	Kedah FA	3–1	Malaysia FA Cup Semi-final 2nd Leg	
6 May 2016	15,513	Penang FA	1–0	Malaysia Super League Match Day 10	
11 May 2016	6,545	Bengaluru FC	3–0	AFC Cup Group Stage	
18 May 2016	15,514	Pahang F.C.	3–0	Malaysia Super League Match Day 11	
25 May 2016	17,322	Kaya F.C.	7–2	AFC Cup Round of 16	
12 July 2016	7,430	PKNS F.C.	2–2	Malaysia Cup Group Stage	
16 July 2016	10,580	Kedah FA	5–0	Malaysia Super League Match Day 14	
26 July 2016	16,550	Kelantan FA	1–0	Malaysia Super League Match Day 16	
10 August 2016	20,675	Perak FA	1–1	Malaysia Cup Group Stage	
13 August 2016	10,220	PDRM FA	4–1	Malaysia Cup Group Stage	
16 August 2016	7,780	PDRM FA	4–0	Malaysia Super League Match Day 18	
9 September 2016	24,220	Terengganu FA	3–0	Malaysia Super League Match Day 20	
20 September 2016	17,350	South China AA	2–1	AFC Cup Quarter-final 2nd Leg	
24 September 2016	24,280	T–Team F.C.	5–1	Malaysia Super League Match Day 21	
28 September 2016	18,410	Bengaluru FC	1–1	AFC Cup Semi-final 1st Leg	

Match(s) designated as Home Team, but not played at Larkin Stadium.

Date	Venue	Attendance	Opposition	Score	Competition	Ref
14 May 2016	Shah Alam Stadium, Selangor	75,000	PKNS F.C	2–1	Malaysia FA Cup Final	

=== Attendance (Each Competitions) ===
Competition(s)	Match(s)	Total Attendance	Average Attendance per Match
Malaysia Super League	11	192,047	17,459
Malaysia FA Cup	3	69,273	23,091
Malaysia Cup	3	38,325	12,775
AFC Cup	6	88,047	14,675
Total	23	387,692	16,856

== See also ==
- 2016 Johor Darul Ta'zim II F.C. season
- List of unbeaten football club seasons
