= 2016 Malaysia FA Cup final =

- The match programme cover
- Event: 2016 Malaysia FA Cup
Johor Darul Ta'zim	PKNS
(Johor)	(Selangor)
2	1
- Date: 14 May 2016
- Venue: Shah Alam Stadium, Shah Alam
- Man of the Match: Pereyra Díaz
- Referee: Syed Azhar Syed Kamar
- Attendance: 75,000
- Weather: Rain night 25 °C (77 °F); 100% humidity

The 2016 Malaysia FA Cup final was the 27th final of the Malaysia FA Cup, the Malaysia football cup competition. Johor Darul Ta'zim F.C. assured a place for the 2017 AFC Cup group stage.

== Background ==
The final was played on 14 May 2016 at Shah Alam Stadium.

== Route to the Final ==
=== Johor Darul Ta'zim ===
Round	Opposition	Score
First Round	Bye	
Second Round	UiTM (a)	5–0
Third Round	Negeri Sembilan (h)	4–1
Quarter-finals	PDRM (1st leg) (a)	0–1
Quarter-finals	PDRM (2nd leg) (h)	5–2
Semi-final	Kedah (1st leg) (a)	1–2
Semi-final	Kedah (2nd leg) (h)	3–1
Key: (h) = Home venue; (a) = Away venue.

=== PKNS ===
Round	Opposition	Score
First Round	Bye	
Second Round	Terengganu (h)	3–1
Third Round	FELDA United (h)	3–2
Quarter-finals	Sime Darby (1st leg) (a)	4–0
Quarter-finals	Sime Darby (2nd leg) (h)	3–2
Semi-final	Perak (1st leg) (h)	2–2
Semi-final	Perak (2nd leg) (a)	2–1
Key: (h) = Home venue; (a) = Away venue.

== Ticket allocation ==
Each club will receive an allocation of 75,000 tickets; 50,000 tickets for JDT, 15,000 tickets for PKNS and 10,000 tickets for purchase online. Ticket prices for adult RM50 and children RM5.

== Rules ==
The final was played as a single match. If tied after regulation, extra time and, if necessary, penalty shoot-out would be used to decide the winner.

== Match ==
=== Details ===
14 May 2016
21:00 (UTC+8)

Johor Darul Ta'zim	2–1	(Selangor) PKNS
Safiq 16' (pen.); Díaz 36'	Report	Guerra 6' (pen.)

Shah Alam Stadium, Shah Alam
Attendance: 75,000
Referee: Syed Azhar Syed Kamar

Johor Darul Ta'zim	PKNS

GK	24	(Malaysia) Izham Tarmizi
RB	12	(Malaysia) S. Kunanlan
CB	7	(Malaysia) Aidil Zafuan
CB	6	(Brazil) Marcos António	(yellow card) 77'
LB	21	(Malaysia) Jasazrin Jamaluddin
RM	2	(Malaysia) Azamuddin Akil		(substituted off) 59'
CM	8	(Malaysia) Safiq Rahim (c)
CM	14	(Singapore) Hariss Harun
LM	28	(Malaysia) Azniee Taib	(yellow card) 74'	(substituted off) 76'
CF	11	(Argentina) Pereyra Díaz	(yellow card) 45+3'
CF	19	(Argentina) Martín Lucero	(yellow card) 90'
Substitutes:
GK	1	(Malaysia) Farizal Marlias
DF	26	(Malaysia) Amer Saidin
DF	25	(Malaysia) Junior Eldstål
MF	5	(Malaysia) Amirul Hadi Zainal		(substituted in) 59'
MF	23	(Malaysia) Chanturu Suppiah
FW	10	(Malaysia) Safee Sali
FW	17	(Malaysia) Amri Yahyah		(substituted in) 76'
Manager:
(Argentina) Mario Gómez

GK	1	(Malaysia) G. Jeevananthan	(yellow card) 16'
RB	5	(Malaysia) Shahrul Azhar Ture
CB	12	(Argentina) Gonzalo Soto (c)
CB	18	(Malaysia) M. Sivakumar		(substituted off) 46'
LB	15	(Malaysia) P. Gunalan	(yellow card) 83'
RM	30	(Palestine) Matías Jadue	(yellow card) 90+3'
CM	24	(Malaysia) Nizam Abu Bakar
CM	8	(Malaysia) Khairu Azrin Khazali	(yellow card) 90+1'
LM	11	(Malaysia) Nazrin Syamsul Bahri	(yellow card) 62'	(substituted off) 70'
CF	14	(Argentina) Juan Cobelli
CF	20	(Argentina) Gabriel Guerra
Substitutes:
GK	22	(Malaysia) Remezey Che Ros
DF	3	(Malaysia) Farid Ramli
DF	27	(Malaysia) Zaiza Zainal Abidin
MF	7	(Malaysia) Shahurain Abu Samah		(substituted in) 46'
MF	23	(Malaysia) S. Thinagaran		(substituted in) 70'
FW	9	(Malaysia) Farderin Kadir
FW	21	(Malaysia) Shakir Ali
Head Coach:
(Malaysia) E. Elavarasan

Man of the Match:
Pereyra Díaz (Johor Darul Ta'zim)

Match rules

- 90 minutes
- 30 minutes of extra time if necessary
- Penalty shoot-out if scores still level
- Seven named substitutes, of which up to three may be used

== See also ==
- 2016 Malaysia Cup Final
