= 2016 Piala Sumbangsih =

Johor Darul Ta'zim	Selangor
1	1
- Johor Darul Ta'zim won 7–6 on penalties
- Date: 13 February 2016
- Venue: Larkin Stadium, Johor Bahru
- Man of the Match: Farizal Marlias (Johor Darul Ta'zim)

The 2016 Piala Sumbangsih was the 31st edition of the Piala Sumbangsih, an annual football match played between the winners of the previous season's Malaysia Super League and Malaysia Cup. The game was played between the Selangor FA, winners of the 2015 Malaysia Cup, and Johor Darul Ta'zim F.C., champions of the 2015 Malaysia Super League.

== Match details ==
13 February 2016
20:45 UTC+8

Johor Darul Ta'zim	1–1	Selangor
Hariss Harun 45'	Report	Hafiz Kamal 60'
Penalties
Safiq Rahim (penalty scored); Nazrin Nawi (penalty scored); Amirul Hadi Zainal (penalty scored); Hariss Harun (penalty scored); Marcos Antonio (penalty scored); Aidil Zafuan (penalty scored); S. Kunanlan (penalty scored)	7−6	Patrick Wleh (penalty scored); S. Veenod (penalty scored); Hafiz Kamal (penalty scored); Razman Roslan (penalty scored); Raimi Mohd Nor (penalty scored); Shahrom Kalam (penalty scored); Azrif Nasrulhaq (penalty missed)

Tan Sri Dato Haji Hassan Yunos Stadium, Johor Bahru, Johor Darul Takzim

GK	1	Farizal Marlias
DF	7	Aidil Zafuan
DF	6	Marcos Antonio
DF	18	Mahali Jasuli		(substituted off) 66'
DF	15	Fazly Mazlan	(yellow card) 88'
MF	14	Hariss Harun
MF	8	Safiq Rahim
MF	12	S. Kunanlan
FW	11	Jorge Pereyra Díaz
FW	19	Juan Martín Lucero		(substituted off) 80'
MF	28	Mohd Azinee Taib		(substituted off) 59'
Substitutes:
MF	2	Azamuddin Akil		(substituted in) 59'
MF	20	Nazrin Nawi		(substituted in) 66'
MF	5	Amirul Hadi Zainal		(substituted in) 80'
FW	10	Safee Sali
FW	17	Mohd Amri Yahyah
MF	21	Jasazrin Jamaluddin
GK	24	Mohd Izham Tarmizi
Coach:
Roberto Carlos Mario Gomez

GK	22	Norazlan Razali
DF	2	Robert Cornthwaite		(substituted off) 85'
DF	5	Shahrom Kalam
DF	20	Azrif Nasrulhaq
DF	15	Raimi Mohd Nor
MF	21	Hafiz Kamal
MF	7	Andik Vermansyah
MF	10	Nazmi Faiz	(yellow card) 45+4'	(substituted off) 68'
FW	16	Mauro Olivi
MF	11	Ahmad Hazwan Bakri		(substituted off) 31'
FW	4	Patrick Wleh
Substitutes:
MF	25	R. Gopinathan		(substituted in) 31'
MF	23	S. Veenod		(substituted in) 68'
DF	13	Razman Roslan		(substituted in) 85'
GK	1	Khairul Azhan Khalid
DF	3	Mohd Azmi Muslim
DF	12	Mohd Bunyamin Umar
FW	14	Abdul Hadi Yahya
Coach:
Zainal Abidin Hassan

Match officials

- Referee:
  - Syed Azhar Syed Kamar
- Assistant referees:
  - Mohd Shahreen Che Omar
  - Nojey anak Nakeng
- Fourth official:
  - Mohd Zohri Tajuddin

== Winners ==
2016 Piala Sumbangsih

Johor Darul Ta'zim
Second title
