= Gary Steven Robbat =

Malaysian footballer (born 1992)

Personal information
- Full name: Gary Steven a/l Robbat
- Date of birth: 3 September 1992 (age 34)
- Place of birth: Kulim, Kedah, Malaysia
- Height: 1.74 m (5 ft 8 1/2 in)
- Position: Defensive midfielder

Team information
- Current team: Kuala Lumpur City

Youth career
- 2006–2007: Bukit Jalil Sports School

Senior career*
Years	Team	Apps	(Gls)
2008–2009	Harimau Muda	29	(7)
2010–2014	Harimau Muda A	50	(15)
2015–2021	Johor Darul Ta'zim	29	(0)
2021	→ Melaka United (loan)	3	(0)
2022–2026	Sabah	27	(1)
2026–	Kuala Lumpur City		

International career^{‡}
2008–2015	Malaysia U21	25	(16)
2010–2015	Malaysia U23	12	(2)
2011–	Malaysia	11	(0)
Medal record
Men's football
Representing Malaysia
Malaysia
AFF Championship
Runner-up	AFF Suzuki Cup 2014	2014
- * Club domestic league appearances and goals as of 20 December 2022 ‡ National team caps and goals as of 21 December 2014

Gary Steven a/l Robbat (born 3 September 1992) is a Malaysian professional football player who plays as a defensive midfielder for Malaysia Super League club Kuala Lumpur City.

== Club career ==
=== Harimau Muda ===
In 2008, Gary was promoted to newly created Harimau Muda from Bukit Jalil Sport School. He was later being put in Harimau Muda A after the team was split into two teams. In 2010, Harimau Muda A went to a training camp in Zlaté Moravce, Slovakia for eight months. On 30 March 2010, Gary and Mohd Muslim Ahmad were given a trial by the Slovak team FC ViOn Zlaté Moravce. Zlaté Moravce coach Ľubomír Moravčík promised Muslim and Gary a professional contract for the 2010–11 season. However, Zlaté Moravce lost interest in Muslim and Gary. In 2011, Gary played in the Malaysia Super League where Harimau Muda A finished in fifth place. In 2012, he played in the Singapore S. League as Harimau Muda finished in fourth place. Gary got his second European stint as Harimau Muda A went to Slovakia for a centralised training camp in 2013. In 2014, he played in Australia's National Premier Leagues. He scored a goal against Redlands United FC as his team lost 3–2.

=== Johor Darul Ta'zim ===
After the end of 2014 season, Gary along with Harimau Muda teammate D. Saarvindran confirmed that they would be joining Pahang FA next year. Johor Darul Takzim later announced that Gary has signed for them. Although he never signed a contract with Kedah FA, KFA president, Datuk Seri Mukhriz Mahathir claimed Gary belong to their team and wanted him to return to his home state. According to Mukhriz, the FAM rule state that any Harimau Muda player whose contract expires with the national junior squad will return to their respective state teams first. On 16 January 2015, Gary has been banned for three months and fined RM50,000 by the Football Association of Malaysia for signing contracts with two Super League teams.

On 26 January 2015, Johor Football Association confirmed that Gary will be heading to Germany to train with Borussia Dortmund. Gary, who has been suspended from all football activities under the Football Association of Malaysia's jurisdiction for three months, will spend the duration of the suspension in Germany.

== International career ==
Gary has represented Malaysia U-21 and U-23 level. He was included in Malaysia's U-23 squad for 2010 Asian Games in Guangzhou, China and 2014 Asian Games in Incheon, South Korea. Gary was also part of the Malaysian senior squad for AFF Championship in 2012 and 2014.

== Career statistics ==
=== Club ===
As of 27 October 2017.

Appearances and goals by club, season and competition
Club	Season	League			Cup		League Cup		Continental^{1}		Total	
Club	Season	Division	Apps	Goals	Apps	Goals	Apps	Goals	Apps	Goals	Apps	Goals
Harimau Muda A	2011	Malaysia Super League	14	2	??	0	0	0	–		14	2
Harimau Muda A	2012	S.League	16	4	0	0	0	0	–		16	4
Harimau Muda A	2014	Football Queensland	8	2	0	0	0	0	–		8	2
Harimau Muda A	Total		38	8	0	0	0	0	0	0	38	8
Johor Darul Ta'zim	2015	Malaysia Super League	9	0	0	0	6	0	3	0	18	0
Johor Darul Ta'zim	2016	Malaysia Super League	10	0	2	0	??	0	6	0	18	0
Johor Darul Ta'zim	2017	Malaysia Super League	2	0	0	0	4	1	0	0	6	1
Johor Darul Ta'zim	2018	Malaysia Super League	6	0	0	0	2	0	2	0	10	0
Johor Darul Ta'zim	2019	Malaysia Super League	0	0	0	0	0	0	0	0	0	0
Johor Darul Ta'zim	2020	Malaysia Super League	2	0	0	0	0	0	0	0	2	0
Johor Darul Ta'zim	2021	Malaysia Super League	0	0	0	0	0	0	0	0	0	0
Johor Darul Ta'zim	Total		29	0	2	0	12	1	11	0	54	1
Melaka United (loan)	2021	Malaysia Super League	3	0	–		0	0	–		3	0
Melaka United (loan)	Total		3	0	–		0	0	–		3	0
Sabah	2022	Malaysia Super League	15	0	2	0	0	0	–		17	0
Sabah	2023	Malaysia Super League	10	0	1	0	1	0	0	0	0	0
Sabah	Total		25	0	3	0	1	0	0	0	0	0
Career Total			0	0	0	0	0	0	0	0	0	0

^{1} Includes AFC Cup and AFC Champions League.

=== International ===
Malaysia national team
Year	Apps	Goals
2012	6	0
2014	5	0
Total	11	0

== Honours ==
=== Club ===
Johor Darul Ta'zim

- Malaysia Cup (2): 2017, 2019
- Malaysia Super League (5): 2015, 2016, 2017, 2018, 2019
- AFC Cup (1): 2015
- Malaysia Charity Shield (3): 2016, 2018, 2019

=== International ===
Malaysia

- AFF Championship runner-up: 2014
