= K. Sasi Kumar =

Malaysian footballer

Sasi Kumar
Personal information
- Full name: Sasikumar a/l Kishor Kumar
- Date of birth: 29 April 1989 (age 37)
- Place of birth: Johor, Malaysia
- Height: 1.86 m (6 ft 1 in)
- Position: Goalkeeper

Team information
- Current team: Johor Darul Ta'zim II
- Number: 21

Youth career
- 2006: Johor

Senior career*
| Years | Team | Apps | (Gls) |
| 2007–2010 | Harimau Muda | 16 | (0) |
| 2010–2011 | Harimau Muda A | 11 | (0) |
| 2012–2015 | Johor Darul Ta'zim II | 19 | (0) |
| 2016 | Johor Darul Ta'zim | 10 | (0) |
| 2017–2018 | Johor Darul Ta'zim II | 7 | (0) |

International career^{‡}
| 2008–2011 | Malaysia U23 | 20 | (0) |
| 2011 | Malaysia | 1 | (0) |
- * Club domestic league appearances and goals as of 26 September 2017 ‡ National team caps and goals as of 9 January 2014

Sasikumar a/l Kishor Kumar (born 29 April 1989, in Johor Bahru) is a Malaysian footballer who plays for Johor Darul Ta'zim II in Malaysia Premier League as a goalkeeper.

== International career ==
Sasi Kumar made his full international debut for Malaysia national team against Myanmar on 18 June 2011. He played in the last 6 minutes of the match after substituting Sharbinee Allawee.

On 24 June 2011, in a Non FIFA 'A' international match, Sasi Kumar replaced Safee Sali in the striker position at the 81' minute in a friendly match against his own club, Harimau Muda A. Sasi Kumar scored the 3rd goal by a header. The final score was a 3–1 win for the national team of Malaysia.

== Honours ==
Johor Darul Ta'zim

- Malaysia Super League: 2016
