= Fazly Mazlan =

Malaysian footballer (born 1993)

Personal information
- Full name: Muhammad Fazly bin Mazlan
- Date of birth: 22 December 1993 (age 32)
- Place of birth: Muar, Johor, Malaysia.
- Height: 1.74 m (5 ft 9 in)
- Positions: Left-back; wing-back

Team information
- Current team: Penang
- Number: 3

Youth career
- 2009: MP Muar
- 2010–2012: Johor

Senior career*
Years	Team	Apps	(Gls)
2011–2013	Johor	?	(1)
2014–2017	Johor Darul Ta'zim	47	(2)
2015–2019	Johor Darul Ta'zim II	37	(0)
2020–2021	→ Sri Pahang (loan)	24	(0)
2022–2026	Selangor	61	(0)
2026–	Penang	0	(0)

International career^{‡}
2015–	Malaysia	19	(0)
Medal record
Men's football
Representing Malaysia
AFF Championship
Third place	2022
- * Club domestic league appearances and goals as of 16 July 2026 ‡ National team caps and goals as of 10 January 2023

Muhammad Fazly bin Mazlan (born 22 December 1993) is a Malaysian professional footballer who plays as a for Malaysia Super League club Penang. He also represents the Malaysia national team. He has played in a multitude of roles, right and left wing, but has since blossomed as a left-back.

== Club career ==
=== Early career ===
Born in Klang and grew up in Muar, Mazlan began his career with MP Muar, his local club in Muar, before joining the youth setup of Johor State Football Association at age 17.

=== Johor and Johor Darul Ta'zim ===
Mazlan started out in Johor's youth system, playing for the under 17 and under 19 teams, before being promoted to the Johor first team in 2011 season. He was named for Johor Darul Ta'zim squad on 23 December 2013, where he was assigned the shirt number 33 and later 42. He made his debut in a Malaysian Super League against Perak on 18 January 2014 and scored his first professional goal for Johor Darul Takzim F.c on 25 March 2014. He made his AFC Cup 2015 debut against South China AA on 9 March 2010. He also became one of three Johor Darul Ta'zim's youngest ever player in a competitive fixture in AFC Cup 2015. In 2016, he was assigned the shirt number 15.

=== Johor Darul Takzim II ===
Bojan Hodak decided to transfer several players from Johor Darul Takzim first team, including him to 2nd team to help them get match fitness, recovery from any injuries and to help youngster in Johor Darul Takzim II After four months on the second team his was called up to join Johor DT by new appointed head coach Mario Gomez in 2015 April transfer window.

==== Sri Pahang (loan) ====
In January 2020, Mazlan moved to Pahang as a loan player.

=== Selangor ===
On 26 December 2021, Mazlan moved to Selangor and joined as a free agent after his contract with childhood club, Johor Darul Ta'zim expired. He signed a two-year deal with the club. In 2022 season, Fazly made 28 appearances in all competition for Selangor.

=== Penang ===
On 4 July 2026, Fazly signed with Penang following his release from Selangor.

== International career ==
Mazlan was called up to the 2015 FIFA World Cup qualification campaign. He made his debut against Palestine on 12 November 2015. In November 2022, he was called up to the national team for the 2022 AFF Mitsubishi Electric Cup.

== Career statistics ==
As of 10 January 2022

Appearances and goals by national team and year
National team	Year	Apps	Goals
Malaysia	2015	2	0
Malaysia	2016	5	0
Malaysia	2017	1	0
Malaysia	2018	4	0
Malaysia	2022	4	0
Malaysia	2023	3	0
Total		19	0

== Honours ==
Johor Darul Ta'zim

- Malaysia Super League: 2014, 2015, 2016, 2017
- Malaysia Charity Shield: 2015, 2016
- AFC Cup: 2015
- Malaysia FA Cup: 2016
- Malaysia Cup: 2017

Johor Darul Ta'zim II F.C.

- Malaysia Challenge Cup(1): 2019

Selangor

- Malaysia Cup runner-up: 2022
- Malaysia Super League runner-up: 2023
- MFL Challenge Cup: 2024-25
