= Azrif Nasrulhaq =

Malaysian footballer (born 1991)

Personal information
- Full name: Mohd Azrif Nasrulhaq bin Badrul Hisham
- Date of birth: 27 May 1991 (age 35)
- Place of birth: Selangor, Malaysia
- Height: 1.68 m (5 ft 6 in)
- Position: Right back

Team information
- Current team: Sri Pahang
- Number: 29

Youth career
- 2010: PKNS

Senior career*
Years	Team	Apps	(Gls)
2010–2012	PKNS	33	(10)
2013–2014	Harimau Muda A	5	(0)
2015–2016	Selangor	32	(1)
2016–2023	Johor Darul Ta'zim	50	(1)
2023	→ Sri Pahang (loan)	23	(1)
2024–	Sri Pahang	0	(0)

International career^{‡}
2013–2014	Malaysia U-23	16	(2)
2015–2018	Malaysia	12	(0)
- * Club domestic league appearances and goals as of 9 December 2022 ‡ National team caps and goals as of 3 November 2018

Mohd Azrif Nasrulhaq bin Badrul Hisham (born 27 May 1991) is a Malaysian professional footballer who plays for Malaysia Super League club Sri Pahang. He mainly plays as a right back but can also play as a right winger.

== Club career ==
=== PKNS ===
Born and raised in Kota Damansara in Petaling Jaya, Azrif started his career with PKNS youth club in 2010 at age 18. The national youth club Harimau Muda A was impressed with his strong performance with PKNS reserve side and won a bronze medal in Sukma Games while representing Selangor.

=== Harimau Muda A ===
In 2013, Azrif played for Harimau Muda A in the 2013 S.League in Singapore and the 2014 NPL Queensland league in Australia.

=== Selangor ===
In late 2014, Azrif later joined Selangor after he exceeded the age limit for Harimau Muda A.

=== Johor Darul Ta'zim ===
On 29 June 2016, Johor Darul Ta'zim have finally officially announced their intention of signing Azrif from Selangor, after a month of speculation. On 15 July 2016, Azrif signed with a contract with Johor Darul Ta'zim after Football Association of Selangor (FAS) and the Johor Football Association (JFA) agreed on the transfer. On 13 September 2016, he make his debut for the club in the 2016 AFC Cup quarter-final match against Hong Kong club, South China.

On 8 February 2019, Azrif recorded his first club goal in a league match against Kuala Lumpur City in a 4–1 win.

=== Sri Pahang ===
On 29 December 2022, Azrif joined Sri Pahang on loan ahead of the 2023 Malaysia Super League season citing for more playing time. He make his club debut on 29 February 2023 against Negeri Sembilan. On 27 August 2023, he scored his first club goal in a 5–1 against Kelantan United.

On 22 January 2024, Azrif joined Sri Pahang permanently after the expiration of his contract at Johor Darul Ta'zim.

== International career ==
On 17 November 2015, Azrif made his debut for the Malaysia national team coming off the bench in a 1–2 defeat to UAE.

== Career statistics ==
=== Club ===
As of 28 October 2017

Appearances and goals by club, season and competition
Club	Season	League			Cup		League Cup		Continental		Total	
Club	Season	Division	Apps	Goals	Apps	Goals	Apps	Goals	Apps	Goals	Apps	Goals
PKNS	2010	Malaysia Premier League	?	?	0	0	0	0	0	0	0	0
PKNS	2011	Malaysia Premier League	21	9	0	0	0	0	0	0	0	0
PKNS	2012	Malaysia Super League	12	1	0	0	0	0	0	0	0	0
PKNS	Total		33	10	0	0	0	0	0	0	33	10
Harimau Muda A	2013	S.League	0	0	0	0	0	0	0	0	0	0
Harimau Muda A	2014	NPL Queensland	0	0	0	0	0	0	0	0	0	0
Harimau Muda A	Total		0	0	0	0	0	0	0	0	0	0
Selangor	2015	Malaysia Super League	21	0	2	0	10	0	–		33	0
Selangor	2016	Malaysia Super League	11	1	2	0	1	0	5	0	19	1
Selangor	Total		32	1	4	0	11	0	5	0	52	1
Johor Darul Ta'zim	2016	Malaysia Super League	5	0	0	0	?	?	4	0	9	0
Johor Darul Ta'zim	2017	Malaysia Super League	15	0	3	0	7	0	5	0	30	0
Johor Darul Ta'zim	2018	Malaysia Super League	13	0	4	0	4	0	6	0	27	0
Johor Darul Ta'zim	2019	Malaysia Super League	13	1	1	0	0	0	2	0	16	1
Johor Darul Ta'zim	2020	Malaysia Super League	0	0	0	0	0	0	0	0	0	0
Johor Darul Ta'zim	2021	Malaysia Super League	4	0	0	0	1	0	5	0	10	0
Johor Darul Ta'zim	2022	Malaysia Super League	0	0	0	0	0	0	0	0	0	0
Johor Darul Ta'zim	Total		50	1	8	0	12	0	22	0	92	1
Sri Pahang (loan)	2023	Malaysia Super League	23	1	2	0	4	0	–		29	1
Sri Pahang (loan)	Total		23	1	2	0	4	0	–		29	1
Career Total			138	13	14	0	27	0	27	0	206	13

=== International ===
As of 3 November 2018

Appearances and goals by national team and year
National team	Year	Apps	Goals
Malaysia	2015	1	0
Malaysia	2016	9	0
Malaysia	2018	2	0
Total		12	0

== Honours ==
=== Club ===
Selangor

- Malaysia Cup: 2015

Johor Darul Ta'zim

- Malaysia Cup (2): 2017, 2019
- Malaysia Super League (5): 2016, 2017, 2018, 2019, 2020
- Malaysia Charity Shield (4): 2019, 2020, 2021, 2022
