= Aidil Zafuan =

Malaysian footballer (born 1987)

Aidil Zafuan عيدالزافوان
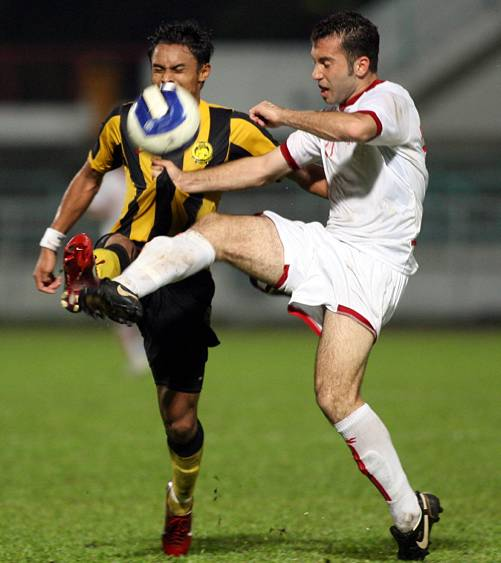
- Zafuan (left) playing for Malaysia against Syria in 2007

Personal information
- Full name: Mohamad Aidil Zafuan bin Abd. Radzak
- Date of birth: 3 August 1987 (age 39)
- Place of birth: Seremban, Negeri Sembilan, Malaysia
- Height: 1.78 m (5 ft 10 in)
- Position: Centre-back

Team information
- Current team: Malaysia (Assistant coach)

Youth career
- 2001–2003: Bukit Jalil Sports School
- 2004–2005: Negeri Sembilan U19

Senior career*
Years	Team	Apps	(Gls)
2005–2011	Negeri Sembilan	23	(11)
2012	ATM	21	(3)
2013–2023	Johor Darul Ta'zim	114	(4)

International career
2004–2006	Malaysia U20		
2007–2014	Malaysia U23	34	(4)
2007–2022	Malaysia	106	(3)

Managerial career
- 2024–2025: Johor Darul Ta'zim (assistant)
- 2024–: Malaysia (assistant)
Medal record
Men's football
Representing Malaysia
Men's football
AFF Championship
Runner-up	2018
Malaysia U23
SEA Games
Gold medal – first place	2009 Laos
Merdeka Tournament
Runner-up	2008
Winner	2007
Malaysia U18
Lion City Cup
Winner	2005
- * Club domestic league appearances and goals as of 27 September 2023

Mohamad Aidil Zafuan bin Abd. Radzak (born 3 August 1987) also known as Aidil Zafuan, is a Malaysian retired professional footballer who last played primarily as a centre-back and is currently working as an assistant coach for Malaysia. In his time with Johor Darul Ta'zim, he has won 26 trophies in total and making 211 appearances for the club.

Aidil is a former member of the Malaysia U23 and Malaysia U20 squad and has represented the Malaysia national team at the 2007 AFC Asian Cup.

Aidil has individually won 5 FAM Football Awards 'Best Defender Award' making him the only defender in the league to hold this record. Aidil has also won 11 Malaysia Super League title where he is the first and only player in the league history to win 10th consecutive league title with Johor Darul Ta'zim. He has also win 5 Malaysia Cup, 8 Malaysia Charity Shield, 4 Malaysia FA Cup and 1 AFC Cup.

== Personal life ==
He is the older brother of his twin Zaquan Adha, who is also a professional footballer. Aidil Zafuan was previously married to Rita Rudaini (actress of Malaysia). They married in 2008, divorced in 2013, and have 2 sons together. He later married Zarema Zainal in 2014.

== Club career ==
=== Negeri Sembilan ===
Aidil Zafuan began his career with Negeri Sembilan youth team. He represented his hometown, Negeri Sembilan at 2004 Sukma Games. He won the gold medal during the tournament that took place at the Tuanku Abdul Rahman Stadium, Seremban. In 2005–06 season, he was promoted to the first team. In his season debut, Negeri Sembilan won their first Malaysia Super League title.

=== Malaysian Armed Forces ===
Aidil signed a contract with Malaysia Premier League side Malaysian Armed Forces for the 2012 Malaysia Premier League season. He won the Malaysia Premier League title in 2012 and reached the 2012 Malaysia Cup Final.

=== Johor Darul Ta'zim ===
In the 2013 season, Aidil joined the rebranded club Johor Darul Ta'zim along with his twin brother, Zaquan Adha. With JDT, he won the Malaysia Super League, Malaysia FA Cup, Malaysia Cup and historically part of JDT's 2015 AFC Cup winning team. Aidil was chosen as the club captain mid-way throughout the 2021 Malaysia Super League season after actual club captain, Hariss Harun left the club.

On 16 November 2022, He made his 200th appearance with the club in all competitions in a 1–0 away win against Sabah where he joins Safiq Rahim and Farizal Marlias to become the third player to reach this milestone

== International career ==
=== Youth ===
Aidil has represented Malaysia since he was 14 years old. He is very experienced in international youth arena. He played for the Malaysia U20 side on two AFC Youth Championship in 2004 in Malaysia as Malaysia reached the quarter-finals but was defeated by China. At the AFC Youth Championship in India, he was chosen as the captain of the team. Malaysia failed to win all three matches and only managed to score 1 goal and conceding 7 goals.

Aidil started representing the Malaysia U23 squad during 2008 Olympic Games qualifier. He continued to represent Malaysia in the 2007 Merdeka Tournament that held in Shah Alam and Petaling Jaya and managed to win the Merdeka Tournament after defeating Myanmar 3:1. He then represented Malaysia in the South East Asia Games held in Thailand. However, Malaysia failed to advance into the semi-finals after drawing against rivals Singapore. In 2009, he was selected as the captain for the national under 23 team at the 2009 Southeast Asian Games where Malaysia won their first gold medal after 20 years. In 2014, he was selected as one of the overage players for the 2014 Asian Games.

=== Senior ===
Aidil made his debut on 18 July 2007 against Cambodia where he also scored his first international goal in his debut against Cambodia. He then became one of the players from the under-23 side who were selected into Malaysia 2007 AFC Asian Cup squad. He only made his appearance in the last game against Iran where Malaysia lost 0–2.

Aidil received his first red card in international duty during the 2010 FIFA World Cup qualifiers second leg against Bahrain. As a result, he was banned by FIFA from taking part in international match for three games.

On 12 July 2016, Aidil with 71 international caps announced his retirement from international football via his football club's website and its Facebook page. He returned in 2017 and was part of Malaysia's 2018 AFF Suzuki Cup squad earning 82 international caps during the tournament. In 2019, he earned his 83rd international caps against Sri Lanka.

He earn his 100 appearances for Malaysia in 2020 AFF Championship against Vietnam. During his international career, Aidil went on to play a total of 101 matches for Malaysia and his international appearances comprise 98 'A' international matches as classified by FIFA including 3 international matches not classified as 'A'.

=== Others ===
Aidil also represented the Malaysia XI (represent Malaysia for B match) squad against Chelsea at the Shah Alam Stadium on 29 July 2008. The Malaysia XI eventually lost 0–2. However, Chelsea coach Luiz Felipe Scolari praise the Malaysia XI for giving a good fight against his team.

== Managerial career ==
After Aidil retirement at the end of the 2023 Malaysia Super League season, he would then take the coaching role as an assistant under head coach, Héctor Bidoglio at Johor Darul Ta'zim.

== Career statistics ==
=== Club ===
As of 16 December 2023.

Appearances and goals by club, season and competition
Club	Season	League			Cup		League Cup		Continental		Other		Total	
Club	Season	Division	Apps	Goals	Apps	Goals	Apps	Goals	Apps	Goals	Apps	Goals	Apps	Goals
Negeri Sembilan	2005–06	Malaysia Super League		1		0		0	–		–			1
Negeri Sembilan	2006–07	Malaysia Super League		1		0		0	5	0	–			1
Negeri Sembilan	2007–08	Malaysia Super League		4		0		0	–		–			4
Negeri Sembilan	2009	Malaysia Super League		3		1		1	–		–			5
Negeri Sembilan	2010	Malaysia Super League		1		0		0	–		–			1
Negeri Sembilan	2011	Malaysia Super League	23	1	1	0	4	0	–		–		28	1
Negeri Sembilan	Total		23	11	1	1	4	1	5	0	–		28	13
ATM	2012	Malaysia Premier League	21	3	1	0	11	1	–		–		33	4
ATM	Total		21	1	1	0	11	1	–		–		33	4
Johor Darul Ta'zim	2013	Malaysia Super League	15	1	5	1	8	0	–		–		28	2
Johor Darul Ta'zim	2014	Malaysia Super League	9	0	2	0	9	0	–		–		20	0
Johor Darul Ta'zim	2015	Malaysia Super League	15	1	0	0	6	0	5	0	–		26	1
Johor Darul Ta'zim	2016	Malaysia Super League	16	1	7	0	2	0	10	1	–		35	2
Johor Darul Ta'zim	2017	Malaysia Super League	12	0	0	0	5	1	5	0	–		22	1
Johor Darul Ta'zim	2018	Malaysia Super League	11	0	0	0	7	0	5	0	–		23	0
Johor Darul Ta'zim	2019	Malaysia Super League	13	0	0	0	9	0	4	0	–		26	0
Johor Darul Ta'zim	2020	Malaysia Super League	8	1	–		1	0	1	0	–		10	1
Johor Darul Ta'zim	2021	Malaysia Super League	9	0	–		0	0	1	0	–		10	0
Johor Darul Ta'zim	2022	Malaysia Super League	5	0	2	0	2	0	1	0	–		10	0
Johor Darul Ta'zim	2023	Malaysia Super League	1	0	0	0	0	0	0	0	–		1	0
Johor Darul Ta'zim	Total		114	4	16	1	49	1	32	1			211	7
Johor Darul Ta'zim	Total		158	16	17	2	60	3	37	1	–		272	7

=== International ===
Appearances and goals by national team and year
National team	Year	Apps	Goals
Malaysia	2007	6	1
Malaysia	2008	11	0
Malaysia	2009	12	0
Malaysia	2010	3	0
Malaysia	2011	8	2
Malaysia	2012	14	0
Malaysia	2013	9	0
Malaysia	2014	5	0
Malaysia	2015	4	0
Malaysia	2016	6	0
Malaysia	2017	3	0
Malaysia	2018	8	0
Malaysia	2019	5	0
Malaysia	2021	10	0
Malaysia	2022	2	0
Total		106	3

Scores and results list Malaysia's goal tally first, score column indicates score after each Aidil Zafuan goal.

List of international goals scored by Aidil Zafuan
No.	Date	Venue	Opponent	Score	Result	Competition
1	18 June 2007	Shah Alam Stadium, Shah Alam, Malaysia	Cambodia	6–0	6–0	Friendly
2	29 June 2011	Bukit Jalil National Stadium, Kuala Lumpur, Malaysia	Chinese Taipei	2–0	2–1	2014 FIFA World Cup qualification
3	3 July 2011	Taipei Municipal Stadium, Taipei, Taiwan	Chinese Taipei	1–0	2–3	2014 FIFA World Cup qualification

== Honours ==
=== Club ===
==== Negeri Sembilan ====
- Sukma Games gold medal: 2004
- Malaysia Super League: 2005−06
- Malaysia Cup: 2009, 2011
- Malaysia FA Cup: 2010

==== Malaysian Armed Forces ====
- Malaysia Premier League: 2012

==== Johor Darul Ta'zim ====
- AFC Cup: 2015
- Malaysia Super League: 2014, 2015, 2016, 2017, 2018, 2019, 2020, 2021, 2022, 2023
- Malaysia FA Cup: 2016, 2022, 2023
- Malaysia Cup: 2017, 2019, 2022, 2023
- Malaysian Charity Shield: 2015, 2016, 2018, 2019, 2020, 2021, 2022, 2023

=== International ===
Malaysia U-18

- Lion City Cup: 2005

Malaysia U-23

- Pestabola Merdeka: 2007; runner-up 2008
- SEA Games : 2009

Malaysia

- AFF Championship runner-up: 2018

=== Individual ===
- ASEAN All-Stars: 2014
- Malaysia Super League 'Best Defender Award': 2009, 2010, 2012, 2015, 2020
- AFC Cup All-Time XI: 2021
