= Azinee Taib =

Malaysian footballer

Personal information
- Full name: Mohd Azinee Bin Taib
- Date of birth: 18 July 1990 (age 36)
- Place of birth: Johor, Malaysia
- Height: 1.72 m (5 ft 7 1/2 in)
- Positions: Forward; winger

Youth career
- 2004–2011: Johor FC

Senior career*
Years	Team	Apps	(Gls)
2012	Johor FA	6	(0)
2013	Johor Darul Ta'zim	8	(4)
2014	Johor Darul Ta'zim II	27	(8)
2015	Penang FA	16	(10)
2016	Johor Darul Ta'zim	12	(10)
2017	Johor Darul Ta'zim II	2	(0)
2017	→ Melaka United (loan)	2	(0)
2018	Penang	5	(2)
- * Club domestic league appearances and goals ‡ National team caps and goals as of October 08, 2016

Mohd Azinee Bin Taib (born 18 July 1990 in Johor Bahru, Johor) is a former Malaysian footballer who played as an attacking midfielder. He was noted for his speed, technical ability, and powerful long-range shots.

== Club career ==
=== Johor FA (2012) ===
A product of the Johor State Football Association, Taib signed a professional contract with Malaysian Premier League side Johor FA, where he played as a forward and attacking midfielder.

=== Johor Darul Ta'zim (2013) ===
In 2013, Taib was promoted to the Malaysian Super League side Johor Darul Ta'zim.

=== Johor Darul Ta'zim II (2014) ===
After not being included in the Johor Darul Ta'zim squad for the 2014 season, Taib joined Johor Darul Ta'zim II, where he made 27 appearances and scored 8 goals.

=== Penang FA (2015) ===
Taib later signed a one-year deal with Penang FA. He made 16 appearances and scored 8 goals, contributing to the club's promotion to the Malaysian Super League for the 2016 season.

=== Johor Darul Ta'zim (2016) ===
Following the end of his contract with Penang FA, Taib returned to Johor Darul Ta'zim in 2016.

=== Johor Darul Ta'zim II (2017) ===
In 2017, after not being selected for the Johor Darul Ta'zim first-team squad, Taib rejoined Johor Darul Ta'zim II for the season.

=== Melaka United (2017) ===
In June 2017, Melaka United announced that they had signed Taib on loan from Johor Darul Ta'zim.

== Career statistics ==
=== Club ===
As of 10 February 2018.

Appearances and goals by club, season and competition
Club	Season	League			Cup		League Cup		Continental		Total	
Club	Season	Division	Apps	Goals	Apps	Goals	Apps	Goals	Apps	Goals	Apps	Goals
Johor Darul Ta'zim II	2014	Malaysia Premier League	0	0	0	0	0	0	–		27	8
Johor Darul Ta'zim II	Total		0	0	0	0	0	0	–		27	8
Penang	2015	Malaysia Premier League	0	4	0	0	0	3	–		0	7
Penang	Total		0	4	0	0	0	3	–		0	7
Johor Darul Ta'zim	2016	Malaysia Super League	16	1	7	2	0	0	7	0	30	3
Johor Darul Ta'zim	Total		16	1	7	2	0	0	7	0	30	3
Melaka United (loan)	2017	Malaysia Super League	2	0	1	0	5	2	–		8	2
Melaka United (loan)	Total		2	0	1	0	5	2	–		8	2
Penang	2018	Malaysia Premier League	3	2	0	0	0	0	–		3	2
Penang	Total		3	2	0	0	0	0	–		3	2
Career Total			0	0	0	0	0	0	–	–	0	0

== Legal issues ==
On 10 July 2023, Mohd Azinee and two associates were arrested by police on suspicion of involvement in a burglary case. He was accused of possessing proceeds from a robbery. According to a magistrate at the Pontian Magistrates' Court in Johor, the first charge alleged that Azinee, together with two other accomplices who remained at large, broke into a house in Taman Benut Utama, Benut, to commit theft.

The alleged offence took place at around 12:05 p.m. on 8 June 2023. Azinee pleaded not guilty to all three charges. The second charge was related to another incident in Ayer Baloi on 3 July 2023, involving him and three others.

If convicted, Azinee and his two associates faced a possible sentence of 15 months' imprisonment.

== Honors ==
=== Club ===
Johor Darul Ta'zim

- Malaysia Super League: 2016
- Malaysia FA Cup: 2016
- Malaysia Charity Shield: 2016
