= Azamuddin Akil =

Malaysian footballer (born 1985)

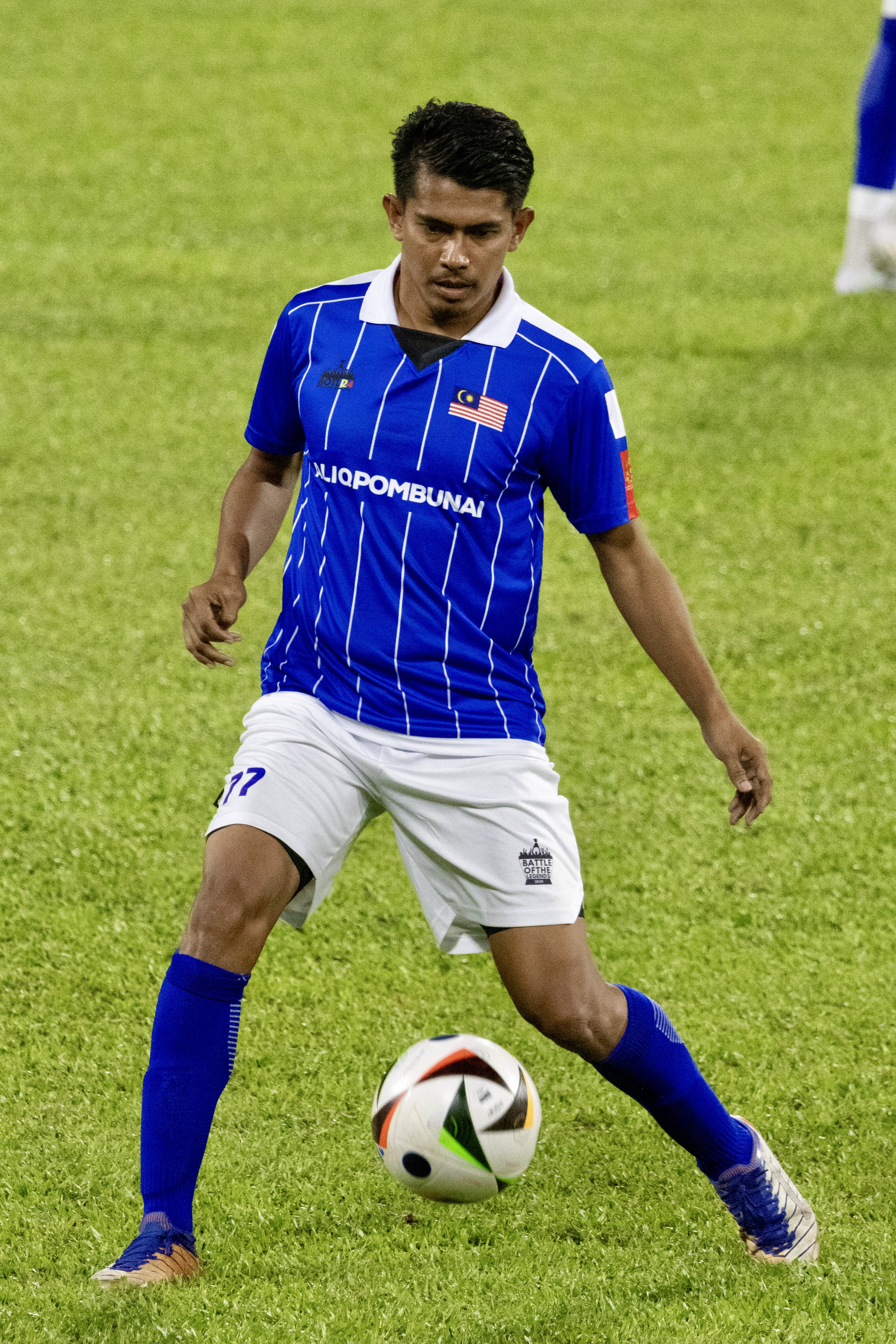
- Alex in 2024

Personal information
- Full name: Azamuddin Bin Mohd Akil
- Date of birth: 16 April 1985 (age 41)
- Place of birth: Pahang, Malaysia
- Height: 1.72 m (5 ft 7 1/2 in)
- Positions: Forward; winger

Team information
- Current team: YPM FC
- Number: 12

Youth career
- 2003–2005: Pahang U-21

Senior career*
Years	Team	Apps	(Gls)
2005–2008	Shahzan Muda	32	(18)
2008–2010	UPB-MyTeam	24	(10)
2010–2015	Pahang	105	(49)
2011	→Kelantan (loan)	7	(0)
2016–2017	Johor Darul Ta'zim	25	(3)
2018	Selangor	6	(0)
2019–2022	Kedah Darul Aman	37	(2)
2023–	YPM FC		

International career^{‡}
2012–2019	Malaysia	38	(5)
Medal record
Men's football
Representing Malaysia
Malaysia
AFF Championship
Runner-up	AFF Suzuki Cup 2014	2014
- * Club domestic league appearances and goals as of 1 October 2022 ‡ National team caps and goals as of 18 December 2017

Azamuddin Bin Mohd Akil (born 16 April 1985), commonly known as Alex, is a Malaysian footballer who plays for Malaysia A2 Amateur League club YPM FC. Because of his pacy style of play, he is always used as a forward.

== Early life ==
Born in Relong, a village located in Kuala Lipis, he is also known as Alex among teammates. Alex started his career as a footballer with Pahang FA President's Cup Team under-19 as the main striker in the Youth Cup in 2003.

== Club career ==
=== Youth career ===
He began his professional football career with Shahzan Muda FC President's Cup Team in 2005, at the age of 20. After showing encouraging performances, he signed first professional contract with Shahzan Muda FC. In 2008, he joined UPB MyTeam FC.

=== UPB-MyTeam ===
After impressed with Shahzan Muda, he decided to join UPB-MyTeam for 2008–2009 season. But his career at Myteam was not long enough after the management of UPB-MyTeam was withdrew from Malaysia League for 2010 season because financial problem. Thus, he returned to Pahang.

=== Pahang ===
UPB MyTeam FC lead to the dissolution of these players returned to the former team, Pahang and partner together with veteran striker, Azizul Kamaludin. In the years 2010 to 2011, he made his name as a main striker but suffered a hamstring injury that forced him to miss several games. After recovering, he returned to the team, but failed to help Pahang remain in the Malaysia Super League. For 2012 season, he was once again to be top scorer for Pahang and help the team to be promoted to Malaysia super league 2013. He continued to advance further in his games and he became one of Pahang's key player throughout the season. At the peak of his performance, on 3 November 2013, he superbly assisted Pahang to defeat Kelantan (0–1) in the Malaysian Cup final which ends Pahang's 21 years drought of the cup. He was then nominated the best player of the tournament.

=== Loan To Kelantan ===
In 2011 Malaysia Cup, he went on loan to Kelantan and manage to score 6 goals for the team.

=== Return To Pahang ===
For 2012 season, he was once again to be top scorer for Pahang and help the team to be promoted to Malaysia super league 2013. He continued to advance further in his games and he became one of Pahang's key player throughout the season. At the peak of his performance, on 3 November 2013, he superbly assisted Pahang to defeat Kelantan (0–1) in the Malaysian Cup final which ends Pahang's 21 years drought of the cup. He was then nominated the best player of the tournament.

=== Johor Darul Ta'zim ===
On 17 December 2015, Azamuddin signed for 2015 AFC Cup winners Johor Darul Ta'zim on a two-year deal. He made his debut as substitute on 13 February 2016 against Selangor in the 2016 Charity Shield, which JDT won on penalties. That day, he also made his first appearance with the club on the first Super League matches.

On 16 February 2016, Azamuddin scored his first JDT goal against T–Team in the 28th minute of the game. He collected his first Super League title winner's medal at the end of the 2016 season.

=== Selangor ===
After two seasons with Johor Darul Ta'zim, Azamuddin signed a one-year contract with another Malaysian club Selangor on a free transfer.

=== Kedah ===
On 1 December 2018, Azamuddin Akil agreed to join Malaysia Super League side Kedah Darul Aman.

== International career ==
In Mac 2012, Mohd Azamuddin Akil was among the national team's recruits for the friendly against Sarawak FA in Kuching on 24 March. The 26-year-old from Kuala Lipis has been in top form for Pahang FA, having scored seven goals in the Premier League.

National coach Datuk K. Rajagopal is preparing the team for the Asean Football Federation (AFF) Championship in November.

On 28 April 2012, he scored the first international goal for the senior team in a friendly match against Sri Lanka. He scored in another game against Singapore giving Malaysia the lead on 8 June 2012. On 30 July 2012, he scored the only Malaysia Selection goal in a friendly match against Manchester City with Malaysia XI lost 3–1 to Premier League champion.

Malaysian coach K. Rajagobal has announced his 22-man squad for the side's AFF Suzuki Cup title defence which starts on 25 November. Rajagobal has dropped three players from the initial 25-man squad, with goalkeeper Izham Tarmizi omitted in favour of Kelantan's Khairul Fahmi and veteran Farizal Marlias from Perak.ATM defender Irwan Fadzli Idrus all misses out, along with Zaquan Adha, who is left out after injuring himself in Harimau Malaysia's final warm-up friendly against Bangladesh on Tuesday. He has been replaced by Pahang' Azamuddin Akil.

=== International statistics ===
International appearances and goals
#	Date	Venue	Opponent	Result	Goal	Competition
2012
1.	28 April	Shah Alam, Malaysia	Sri Lanka	6–0 (W)	1	Friendly
2.	1 June	Shah Alam, Malaysia	Philippines	0–0 (D)	0	Friendly
3.	8 June	Jalan Besar, Singapore	Singapore	2–2 (D)	1	Friendly
4.	12 June	Shah Alam, Malaysia	Singapore	2–0 (W)	0	Friendly
5.	11 September	Shah Alam, Malaysia	Vietnam	0–2 (L)	0	Friendly
6.	16 October	Mong Kok, Hong Kong	Hong Kong	0–3 (W)	0	Friendly
7.	3 November	Hanoi, Vietnam	Vietnam	1–0 (L)	0	Friendly
8.	7 November	Muang Thong Thani, Thailand	Thailand	2–0 (L)	0	Friendly
9.	14 November	Shah Alam, Malaysia	Hong Kong	1–1 (D)	0	Friendly
10.	25 November	Bukit Jalil, Malaysia	Singapore	0–3 (L)	0	2012 AFF Suzuki Cup
11.	1 December	Bukit Jalil, Malaysia	Indonesia	2–0 (W)	1	2012 AFF Suzuki Cup
12.	9 December	Bukit Jalil, Malaysia	Thailand	1–1 (D)	0	2012 AFF Suzuki Cup
13.	13 December	Bangkok, Thailand	Thailand	0–2 (L)	0	2012 AFF Suzuki Cup
2013
14.	6 February	Doha, Qatar	Qatar	0–2 (L)	0	2015 AFC Asian Cup qualification
15.	22 March	Shah Alam, Malaysia	Yemen	2–1 (W)	1	2015 AFC Asian Cup qualification
16.	10 September	Tianjin, China	China	0–2 (L)	0	Friendly
17.	15 October	Shah Alam, Malaysia	Bahrain	1–1 (D)	0	2015 AFC Asian Cup qualification
18.	15 November	Riffa, Bahrain	Bahrain	0–1 (L)	0	2015 AFC Asian Cup qualification
19.	19 November	Shah Alam Malaysia	Qatar	0–1 (L)	0	2015 AFC Asian Cup qualification
2014
20.	27 April	Cebu, Philippine	Philippines	0–0 (D)	0	Friendly
21.	8 August	Dushanbe, Tajikistan	Tajikistan	4–1 (L)	0	Friendly
22.	14 September	Surabaya, Indonesia	Indonesia	2–0 (L)	0	Friendly
23.	20 October	Shah Alam, Malaysia	Cambodia	4–1 (W)	0	Friendly
24.	12 November	Shah Alam, Malaysia	Syria	0–3 (L)	0	Friendly
25.	16 November	Hanoi, Vietnam	Vietnam	3–1 (L)	0	Friendly
26.	23 November	Jalan Besar, Singapore	Myanmar	0–0 (D)	0	2014 AFF Suzuki Cup
27.	29 November	Kallang Stadium, Singapore	Singapore	3–1 (W)	0	2014 AFF Suzuki Cup
28.	7 December	Shah Alam Stadium, Malaysia	Vietnam	1–2 (L)	0	2014 AFF Suzuki Cup
29.	11 December	Mỹ Đình National Stadium, Vietnam	Vietnam	2–4 (W)	0	2014 AFF Suzuki Cup
30.	17 December	Rajamangala Stadium, Thailand	Thailand	0–2 (L)	0	2014 AFF Suzuki Cup
31.	20 December	Bukit Jalil Stadium, Malaysia	Thailand	3–2 (W)	0	2014 AFF Suzuki Cup
2015
32.	6 June	Shah Alam Stadium, Malaysia	Hong Kong	0–0 (D)	0	Friendly
33.	6 June	Bukit Jalil Stadium, Malaysia	Timor-Leste	1–1 (D)	0	2018 FIFA World Cup qualification
34.	8 October	Thai Army Sports Stadium, Thailand	Laos	3–1 (W)	1	Friendly

== Honours ==
Pahang

- Malaysia Cup: 2013, 2014
- Malaysia FA Cup: 2014
- Malaysian Charity Shield: 2014

Johor Darul Takzim

- Malaysia FA Cup: 2016
- Malaysian Charity Shield: 2016
- Malaysia Super League: 2016, 2017
- Malaysia Cup: 2017

Kedah

- Malaysia FA Cup: 2019

Malaysia

- AFF Championship : 2014 runner up
