= Marcos António (footballer, born 1983) =

Brazilian footballer

Marcos Antônio
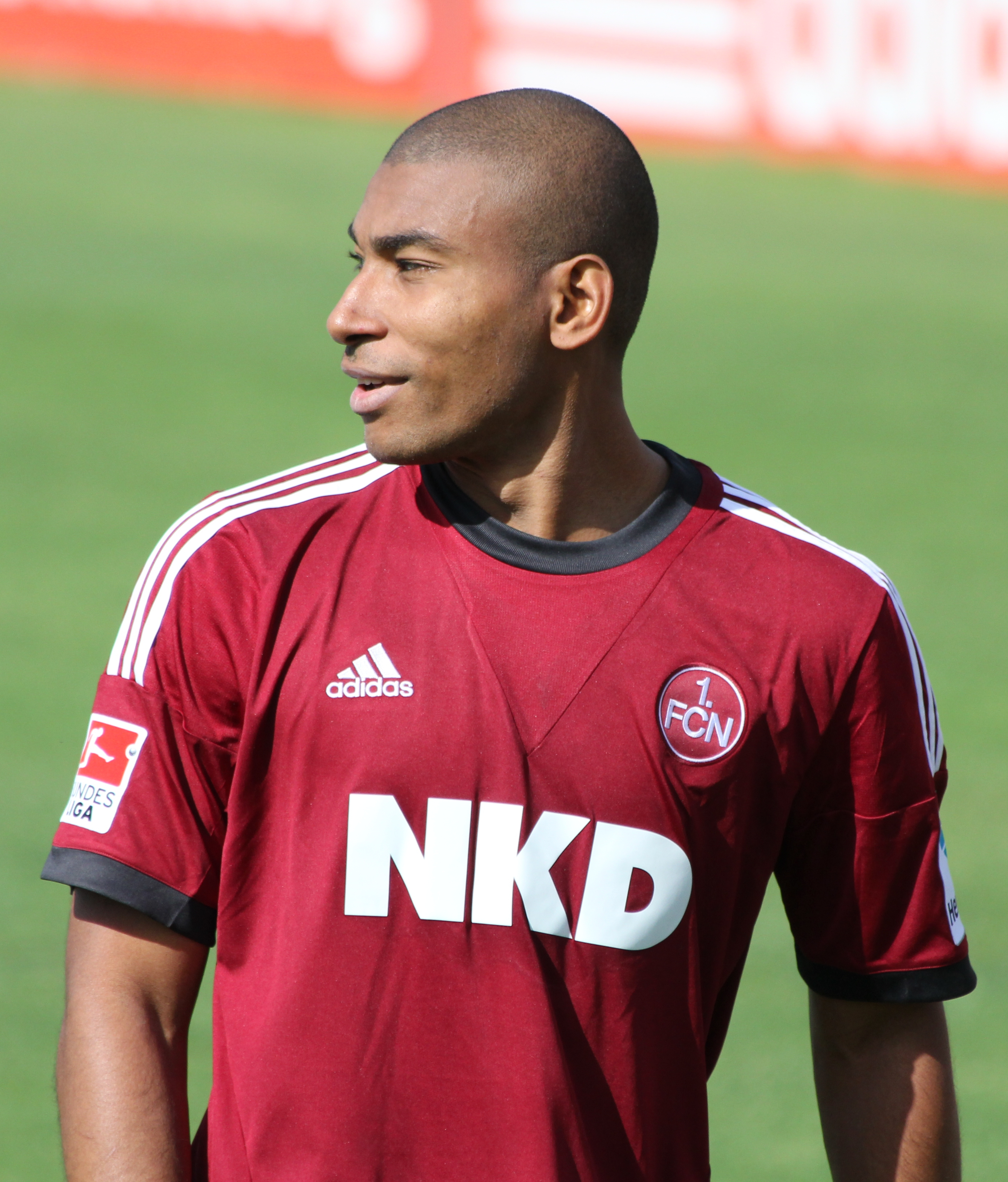
- Marcos Antônio during training in 2013

Personal information
- Full name: Marcos Antônio Elias Santos
- Date of birth: 25 May 1983 (age 43)
- Place of birth: Alagoinhas, Brazil
- Height: 1.87 m (6 ft 2 in)
- Position: Centre-back

Youth career
- 2001: Corinthians Alagoano

Senior career*
Years	Team	Apps	(Gls)
2002–2003	Porto B	16	(1)
2003	→ Académica de Coimbra (loan)	12	(0)
2003–2006	Gil Vicente	62	(4)
2006–2007	→ U.D. Leiria (loan)	29	(1)
2007–2009	Auxerre	10	(0)
2008–2009	→ PAOK (loan)	16	(1)
2010	Belenenses	14	(0)
2010–2012	Rapid București	62	(3)
2012–2013	1. FC Nürnberg	1	(0)
2014–2018	Johor Darul Ta'zim	103	(12)
Total		326	(22)
- * Club domestic league appearances and goals

Marcos Antônio Elias Santos (born 25 May 1983), known as Marcos Antônio, is a Brazilian former professional footballer who played as a centre-back.

== Career ==
Marcos António was born in Alagoinhas, Brazil.

On 21 August 2002, FC Porto signed him but loaned him to Académica in January 2003. He then played for Gil Vicente for three seasons, and then for U.D. Leiria, before joining AJ Auxerre in summer 2007.

=== PAOK ===
He signed a one-year contract on loan, but PAOK FC had an option to buy him out after its expiration. Marcos Antonio scored the first goal for PAOK in the 2008–09 Greek Superleague in his first appearance. He finished the season at PAOK and then returned to Auxerre.

In April 2009, Marcos António was diagnosed with throat cancer. He had first complained about a sore throat two months earlier, but did not discover the cause until his wife insisted that he visit an otolaryngologist.

=== Belenenses ===
In January 2010, he left Auxerre and returned to Portugal, where he signed for C.F. Os Belenenses.

=== Rapid București ===
Marcos António scored two goals in a 5–0 win against FC Petrolul Ploieşti in the Romanian Cup. He scored another goal in a 2–0 win against Sportul Studențesc in the Liga I.

=== 1. FC Nürnberg ===
In June 2012, he signed a contract with 1. FC Nürnberg until 2014. He made his debut for Der Club in the DFB-Pokal against TSV Havelse. On 29 September 2012, he made his Bundesliga debut against VfB Stuttgart, but made two bad errors early in the game, and was substituted after 16 minutes. It would be the only Bundesliga appearance of his career.

=== Johor Darul Ta'zim ===
In April 2014, he signed a contract with Johor Darul Ta'zim to replace Baihakki Khaizan in their defense. He played for his new club in a home game against title rival, Pahang FA, in the FA Cup semi-final first leg, keeping the visitor's forward, Dickson Nwakaeme, at bay. He almost got his first goal for his new club, but his header on the far post was not on target. He finally scored his first goal in the Malaysia Super League to help JDT beat Pahang 2–0 in the 36th minute.

== Honours ==
=== Club ===
Johor Darul Ta'zim

- Malaysia Super League: 2014, 2015, 2016, 2017, 2018
- Malaysia Charity Shield: 2015, 2016, 2018
- Malaysia FA Cup: 2016
- AFC Cup: 2015
- Malaysia Cup: 2017
