= S. Veenod =

Malaysian football player

Personal information
- Full name: Veenod Subramaniam
- Date of birth: 31 March 1988 (age 38)
- Place of birth: Penang, Malaysia
- Height: 1.72 m (5 ft 7 1/2 in)
- Position: Midfielder

Team information
- Current team: Bunga Raya
- Number: 23

Youth career
- 2007–2008: Penang Reserves

Senior career*
| Years | Team | Apps | (Gls) |
| 2008–2010 | Penang | 37 | (8) |
| 2011–2012 | USM | 15 | (6) |
| 2012 | → Selangor (loan) | 6 | (1) |
| 2013–2017 | Selangor | 65 | (2) |
| 2018 | Kelantan | 3 | (0) |
| 2018 | Melaka United | 10 | (0) |
| 2019 | Petaling Jaya City | 18 | (0) |
| 2020 | PDRM | | |
| 2020–2022 | Sarawak United | 31 | (0) |
| 2023 | Melaka | 5 | (0) |
| 2024–2025 | PT Athletic | | |

International career
| 2016– | Malaysia | 5 | (0) |
- * Club domestic league appearances and goals

Veenod a/l Subramaniam (Malay pronunciation: [ʋeːʲeːnoːd sʊbrəmənɪəmə]; born 31 March 1988 in Penang, Malaysia) is a Malaysian professional footballer who plays as a midfielder.

Veenod started off as a striker in his early days with Penang before Selangor's former head coach Irfan Bakti tried him out as a defensive midfielder in 2012 Malaysia Cup. Veenod also was used as an attacking midfielder or as a right winger.

== Club career ==
Veenod started taking football seriously at age 17. Before turning to football, Veenod was one of the most feared marathon runners in Penang. He represented his school and district in the 3000 metres steeplechase and 5000 metres. Veenod was absorbed into Bintang Biru Football Academy at his youth. He also represented his state in the Under-19 Youth Cup before getting promoted to the Penang President Cup team.

In 2008, Veenod made a huge break into Penang first team. In 2011, Veenod signed a contract with USM. During 2012 Malaysia Cup campaign he was loaned to Selangor and made 6 appearances and 1 goal during the tournament.

On 7 November 2012, it was announced that Veenod moved to Selangor permanently from USM for the 2013 Malaysia Super League.

On 22 November 2017, Veenod signed a two-year contract with Kelantan. On 6 February 2018, Veenod made his debut for Kelantan in a 1–1 draw against Terengganu coming off from the bench for Nik Akif. He was released by Kelantan in April 2018.

On 30 May 2018, Veenod signed a contract with Melaka United.

== International career ==
Veenod made his debut for the Malaysia national team on 6 September 2016, as an early substitute for the injured Brendan Gan on the 17th minute of a friendly match against Indonesia, which Malaysia lost 0–3.

== Career statistics ==
=== Club ===
As of match played 28 July 2018.

Appearances and goals by club, season and competition
| Club | Season | League | | | Cup | | League Cup | | Continental | | Total | |
| Club | Season | Division | Apps | Goals | Apps | Goals | Apps | Goals | Apps | Goals | Apps | Goals |
|---|---|---|---|---|---|---|---|---|---|---|---|---|
| Penang | 2009 | Malaysia Super League | 0 | 1 | 0 | 0 | 0 | 0 | – | | 0 | 0 |
| Penang | 2010 | Malaysia Super League | 0 | 2 | 0 | 0 | 0 | 0 | – | | 0 | 0 |
| Penang | Total | | 0 | 0 | 0 | 0 | 0 | 0 | – | | 0 | 0 |
| USM | 2011 | Malaysia Premier League | 10 | 3 | 0 | 0 | 0 | 0 | – | | 0 | 0 |
| USM | 2012 | Malaysia Premier League | 5 | 3 | 0 | 0 | 0 | 0 | – | | 0 | 0 |
| USM | Total | | 15 | 6 | 0 | 0 | 0 | 0 | – | | 0 | 0 |
| Selangor (loan) | 2012 | Malaysia Super League | – | | | | 6 | 1 | – | | 6 | 1 |
| Selangor (loan) | Total | | – | | | | 6 | 1 | – | | 6 | 1 |
| Selangor | 2013 (Note: No data available for Veenod's 2013 appearances and goals except for 2013 Malaysia FA Cup) | Malaysia Super League | 0 | 0 | 4 | 0 | 0 | 0 | – | | 0 | 0 |
| Selangor | 2014 | Malaysia Super League | 17 | 1 | 1 | 0 | 6 | 0 | 6 | 0 | 30 | 1 |
| Selangor | 2015 | Malaysia Super League | 11 | 0 | 1 | 0 | 7 | 0 | – | | 19 | 0 |
| Selangor | 2016 | Malaysia Super League | 17 | 0 | 2 | 0 | 11 | 0 | 6 | 0 | 36 | 0 |
| Selangor | 2017 | Malaysia Super League | 20 | 1 | 1 | 0 | 7 | 0 | – | | 28 | 1 |
| Selangor | Total | | 65 | 2 | 9 | 0 | 31 | 0 | 12 | 0 | 117 | 2 |
| Kelantan | 2018 | Malaysia Super League | 3 | 0 | 2 | 0 | 0 | 0 | – | | 5 | 0 |
| Kelantan | Total | | 3 | 0 | 2 | 0 | 0 | 0 | – | | 5 | 0 |
| Melaka United | 2018 | Malaysia Super League | 10 | 0 | 0 | 0 | 0 | 0 | – | | 10 | 0 |
| Melaka United | Total | | 10 | 0 | 0 | 0 | 0 | 0 | – | | 10 | 0 |
| Career Total | | | 0 | 0 | 0 | 0 | 0 | 0 | – | – | 0 | 0 |

=== International ===
As of 13 November 2017

Appearances and goals by national team and year
| National team | Year | Apps | Goals |
|---|---|---|---|
| Malaysia | 2016 | 4 | 0 |
| Malaysia | 2017 | 1 | 0 |
| Total | | 5 | 0 |

== Honours ==
=== Club ===
Selangor

- Malaysia Super League: Runner-up 2013, 2014
- Malaysia Cup: 2015, Runner-up 2016
