= 2014 Malaysia FA Cup final =

- Event: 2014 Malaysia FA Cup
Pahang	Felda United
(Pahang)	(Kuala Lumpur)
2	1
- Date: 7 June 2014
- Venue: Shah Alam Stadium, Shah Alam
- Man of the Match: Mohd Faizol Hussien (Pahang)
- Referee: Shamsudin Ibrahim (Kuala Lumpur)
- Attendance: 60,000

The 2014 Malaysia FA Cup final was a football match which was played on 7 June 2014, to determine the champion of the 2014 Malaysia FA Cup.

The final was played between Pahang and Felda United. Pahang won 2–1 to win their second Malaysia FA Cup title after winning it in 2006, thus qualifying for the group stage of the 2015 AFC Cup.

== Venue ==
The final was held at the Shah Alam Stadium in Shah Alam.

== Road to final ==
Opponent	Agg.	1st leg	2nd leg	Knockout phase	Opponent	Agg.	1st leg	2nd leg
Perak	2–2 (aet) (4–5 p) (A) (one-leg match)			Round of 32	Negeri Sembilan	0–1 (A) (one-leg match)		
(Singapore) LionsXII	1–2 (A) (one-leg match)			Round of 16	(Kuala Lumpur) Sime Darby	0–1 (A) (one-leg match)		
(Kuala Lumpur) PDRM FA	3–2	1–1 (A)	2–1 (H)	Quarterfinals	Sarawak	2–2 (a.g.r)	0–0 (H)	2–2 (A)
Johor Darul Takzim	2–1	1–1 (A)	1–0 (H)	Semifinals	Kelantan	5–5 (a.g.r)	3–3 (A)	2–2 (H)

== Match details ==
Saturday, 7 June
20:45 UTC+08:00

Pahang	2 – 1	(Kuala Lumpur) Felda United
Mohd Faizol Hussien 79'; Dickson Nwakaeme 88'	Report	Edward Junior Wilson 22'

Shah Alam Stadium, Shah Alam
Attendance: 60,000
Referee: Shamsudin Ibrahim

Pahang	Felda United

GK	1	(Malaysia) Khairul Azhan Khalid
RB	3	(Malaysia) Saiful Nizam Miswan
CB	13	(Malaysia) Mohd Razman Roslan (c)
CB	4	(Jamaica) Damion Stewart
LB	20	(Malaysia) Mohd Shahrizan Salleh
RM	12	(Malaysia) Azamuddin Akil	(yellow card) 55' (substituted off) 56'
CM	11	(Malaysia) Mohd Hafiz Kamal
CM	8	(Malaysia) Azidan Sarudin	(yellow card) 50' (substituted off) 69'
LM	24	(Malaysia) Gopinathan Ramachandra
CF	9	(Argentina) Matías Conti	(substituted off) 78'
CF	10	(Nigeria) Dickson Nwakaeme
Substitutes:
MF	21	(Malaysia) Mohd Fauzi Roslan	(substituted in) 56'
MF	21	(Malaysia) Mohd Faizol Hussien	(substituted in) 69'
DF	6	(Pakistan) Zesh Rehman	(substituted in) 78'
Coach:
(Malaysia) Zainal Abidin Hassan

GK	30	(Malaysia) Mohd Farizal Harun
RB	26	(Malaysia) Hasni Zaidi Jamian
CB	3	(Uzbekistan) Yaroslav Krushelnitskiy	(yellow card) 56'
CB	7	(Malaysia) Mohd Khairul Ismail	(yellow card) 53' (substituted off) 70'
LB	18	(Malaysia) Mohd Aizul Ridzuan Razali
RM	11	(Malaysia) Ahmad Syamim Yahya	(substituted off) 64'
CM	12	(Malaysia) Muhammad Shukor Adan (c)
CM	10	(Liberia) Zah Rahan Krangar
LM	15	(Malaysia) Mohd Raimi Mohd Nor	(substituted off) 80'
CF	22	(Liberia) Edward Junior Wilson	(yellow card) 28'
CF	23	(Malaysia) Indra Putra Mahayuddin	(yellow card) 80'
Substitutes:
MF	21	(Malaysia) Mohd Haris Safwan Mohd Kamal	(substituted in) 64'
DF	6	(Malaysia) Mohd Nasriq Baharom	(substituted in) 70'
DF	6	(Malaysia) Shahrulnizam Mustapa	(substituted in) 80' (yellow card) 90'
Coach
(Malaysia) Irfan Bakti Abu Salim

Assistant referees:
Muhammad Mu'azi Zainal Abidin (Malaysia)
Mohd Abd. Suki Said (Malaysia)
Fourth official:
Wan Muhammad Tarmizi Wan Ibrahim (Malaysia)

Match rules

- 90 minutes.
- 30 minutes of extra time if necessary.
- Penalty shoot-out if scores still level.
- Seven named substitutes.
- Maximum of three substitutions.

== Winner ==
2014 Piala FA Winner

Pahang

2nd Title
