= 2015 Pahang FA season =

Pahang FA
2015 season
- Chairman: Tengku Abdul Rahman Ibni Sultan Haji Ahmad Shah
- Head Coach: Zainal Abidin Hassan
- Stadium: Darul Makmur Stadium; Kuantan (Capacity: 40,000)
- Super League: 3rd
- FA Cup: Semi-finals
- Malaysia Cup: Semi-finals
- Charity Shield: Runner-up
- AFC Cup: Quarter-finals
- Top goalscorer: League: Matías Conti (12); All: Matías Conti (17)
- Highest home attendance: 21,970 vs. Johor DT (FA Cup) (2 March 2015)
- Lowest home attendance: 7,500 vs. Global (AFC Cup) (12 March 2015)
Home colours	Away colours	Third colours

The 2015 season has been Pahang FA's 12th season in the Malaysia Super League. Parang began the season on 31 January 2015, with the opening game of their Malaysia Super League campaign. They also competed in the three domestic cups: the Malaysia FA Cup, the Malaysia Cup and the Malaysia Charity Shield.

== Club ==
=== Current coaching staff ===
Position	Name
Manager	(Malaysia) Dato' Che Nasir B Salleh
Head coach	(Malaysia) Zainal Abidin Hassan
Assistant coach	(Malaysia) Ahmad Shaharuddin Rosdi
Goalkeeping coach	(Malaysia) Mudzar Mohamad
Fitness coach	(Malaysia) Mohd Kaizai Zainuddin
Physiotherapist	(Malaysia) Adam Zuhairy Zafri
Kit man/Equipment	(Malaysia) Abdul Razak B Akil/ Abdul Rahim Kadir Ku Jambu
Media Officer	(Malaysia) Fuzzemi Ibrahim
Safety Officer	(Malaysia) Zolkefli Ibrahim
U21 Manager	(Malaysia) Datuk Mohd Tajuddin Abdullah
U21 Head Coach	(Malaysia) Azaruddin Aziz
U21 Assistant Coach	(Malaysia) Fahim Kow Abdullah
U21 Goalkeeping Coach	(Malaysia) Syed Nasir Akil
U21 Physiotherapist	(Malaysia) Mohd Mahyuddin Mohd Idris

=== Kit manufacturers and sponsors ===
Corporation
Kits manufacturers
Puma
Financial sponsors
Resorts World Genting
Chili's
Aras Kuasa
Allianz Malaysia
DRB-HICOM
THR.fm

== Competitions ==
=== Overview ===
Competition	Record							
Competition	G	W	D	L	GF	GA	GD	Win %
Super League	22	13	5	4	43	29	+14	59.09
FA Cup	6	3	2	1	9	7	+2	50.00
Malaysia Cup	10	4	3	3	15	16	−1	40.00
AFC Cup	8	3	3	2	14	14	+0	37.50
Total	46	23	13	10	81	66	+15	50.00

=== Malaysia Super League ===
==== League table ====
Pos	Team	Pld	W	D	L	GF	GA	GD	Pts	Qualification or relegation
1	Johor Darul Ta'zim (C)	22	14	4	4	36	18	+18	46	Qualification to AFC Champions League qualifying preliminary round 2
2	Selangor	22	11	6	5	43	28	+15	39	Qualification to AFC Cup group stage (Note: Since LionsXII, a side managed by the Football Association of Singapore and thus ineligible to represent Malaysia in continental competition, won the 2015 Piala FA, the 2015 Liga Super runners-up will be chosen to represent Malaysia in the AFC Cup.)
3	Pahang	22	13	5	4	43	29	+14	38 (Note: Pahang was docked 6 points due to involvement in the delay in the process of solving the problem of salary and compensation by the former imports season 2013, Mohamed Borji.)	
4	Terengganu	22	12	2	8	40	33	+7	38	
5	Felda United	22	10	6	6	36	26	+10	36	

Source: FAM Official Site, Astro Arena
Rules for classification: 1) points; 2) goal difference; 3) number of goals scored
(C) Champions

==== Matches ====
Win Draw Loss Upcoming fixture

31 January 2015 1 / Charity Shield	Johor Darul Ta'zim	2 – 0	Pahang	Larkin Stadium, Johor Bahru, Johor
20:45 UTC+08:00	Antônio 37'; Figueroa 56'	Report		Attendance: 21,618; Referee: Mohd Amirul Izwan Yaacob

14 February 2015 2	Pahang	1 – 1	Selangor	Darul Makmur Stadium, Kuantan, Pahang
20:45 UTC+08:00	Conti 58'	Report	Andik 64'	Attendance: 16,500; Referee: Nagor Amir Noor Mohamad

21 February 2015 3	Sarawak	0 – 0	Pahang	Sarawak Stadium, Kuching, Sarawak
20:45 UTC+08:00		Report		Attendance: 18,988; Referee: Muhammad Zamzaidi Katimin

7 March 2015 4	Pahang	2 – 0	Sime Darby	Darul Makmur Stadium, Kuantan, Pahang
20:45 UTC+08:00	Rehman 45+2'; Gopinathan 56'	Report		Attendance: 11,011; Referee: Samsudin Ibrahim

14 March 2015 5	ATM	1 – 0	Pahang	Tuanku Abdul Rahman Stadium, Paroi, Negeri Sembilan
20:45 UTC+08:00	Abdulafees 72'	Report		Attendance: 2,000; Referee: Syed Azhar Syed Kamar

4 April 2015 6	Pahang	3 – 2	LionsXII	Darul Makmur Stadium, Kuantan, Pahang
20:45 UTC+08:00	Conti 33'; Gopinathan 65'; Azidan 77'	Report	Faris 15'; Khairul Nizam 90+2'	Attendance: 6,000; Referee: Mohd Nafeez Abd Wahab

11 April 2015 7	Kelantan	0 – 2	Pahang	Sultan Muhammad IV Stadium, Kota Bharu, Kelantan
20:45 UTC+08:00		Report	Stewart 41'; Nwakaeme 56'	Attendance: 7,000; Referee: Mohammad Nazmi Nasaruddin

2015 8	Felda United	0 – 1	Pahang	Selayang Stadium, Selayang, Selangor
20:45 UTC+08:00		Report	Nwakaeme 52'	Attendance: 3,200; Referee: Mohd Zohri Tajuddin

2 May 2015 9	Pahang	3 – 2	Terengganu	Darul Makmur Stadium, Kuantan, Pahang
20:45 UTC+08:00	Rehman 27', 45+1'; Conti 56'	Report	Rangel 23', 81'	Attendance: 17,718; Referee: Mohd Amirul Izwan Yaakub

5 May 2015 10	Pahang	1 – 0	Perak	Darul Makmur Stadium, Kuantan, Pahang
20:45 UTC+08:00	Conti 71' (pen.)	Report		Attendance: 9,689; Referee: Muhd Nazmi Nasaruddin

20 June 2015 11	PDRM	3 - 5	Pahang	Shah Alam Stadium, Shah Alam, Selangor
21:45 UTC+08:00	Traore 49', 77' (pen.), 89' (pen.)	Report	Saarvindaran 15'; Conti 38', 45+1', 69'; Nwakaeme 58'	Attendance: 1500; Referee: Muhammad Nazmi B. Nasarudin

23 June 2015 12	Pahang	1 - 0	PDRM	Darul Makmur Stadium, Kuantan, Pahang
21:45 UTC+08:00	Azidan Sarudin 90+6'	Report		Attendance: 2527; Referee: Samsudin Bin Ibrahim

27 June 2015 13	Pahang	1 - 1	JDT	Darul Makmur Stadium, Kuantan, Pahang
22:00 UTC+08:00	Dickson Nwakaeme 70'	Report	Mohd Amri Yahyah 67'	Attendance: 14758; Referee: Mohd Amirul Izwan Yaacob

4 July 2015 14	Selangor	1 - 3	Pahang	Shah Alam Stadium, Shah Alam, Selangor
22:00 UTC+08:00	Robert Cornthwaite 5'	Report	Rehman 50'; Conti 58'; Hafiz Kamal 67'	Attendance: 11223; Referee: Mohd Nafeez Abdul Wahab

8 July 2015 15	Pahang	3 - 1	Sarawak	Darul Makmur Stadium, Kuantan, Pahang
22:00 UTC+08:00	Rehman 21'; Nwakaeme 70'; Azamuddin 79'	Report	Kalang Tie 64'	Attendance: 4663; Referee: Mohd Zamzaidi Katimin

1 August 2015 16	Sime Darby	2 - 4	Pahang	Majlis Perbandaran Selayang Stadium, Selayang, Selangor
20:45 UTC+08:00	Perović 10', 16'	Report	Stewart 30'; Conti 59', 67'; Fauzi 74'	Attendance: 3985; Referee: Mohd Zamzaidi Katimin

5 August 2015 17	Pahang	2-0	ATM	Darul Makmur Stadium, Kuantan, Pahang
20:45 UTC+08:00	Nwakaeme 14', 34'	Report		Attendance: 4707; Referee: Suhaizi B Shukri

8 August 2015 17	LionsXII	4 - 2	Pahang	Jalan Besar Stadium, Kallang, Singapore
20:45 UTC+08:00				Referee: Syed Azhar Syed Kamar (Kuala Lumpur)

12 August 2015 18	Pahang	5 - 3	Kelantan	Darul Makmur Stadium, Kuantan, Pahang
20:45 UTC+08:00				Referee: Zulkifli Ahmad (Kuala Lumpur)

15 August 2015 19	Perak	v	Pahang	Perak Stadium, Ipoh, Perak
20:45 UTC+08:00				Referee: Nagoor Amir Noor Mohamed (Kuala Lumpur)

== Malaysia FA Cup ==
Date	Round	Opponents	H / A	Result F–A	Scorers	Attendance	Note
2 March 2015	Round 2	Johor Darul Ta'zim	H	1–1 (p 4–2)	Conti 20'	21,970	
21 March 2015	Round 3	MIFA	H	2–1	R Gopinathan 49', Fauzi Roslan 54'	5,400	
7 April 2015	Quarter Final	Penang	H	2-0	Mohd Hafiz Kamal 8', Dickson Nwakaeme '14	8,500	
22 April 2015	Quarter Final	Penang	A	2-2 (arg 4–2)	Dickson Nwakaeme 6', 11'	12,104	
9 May 2015	Semi Final	Kelantan	H	1-0	Conti 2'	31,663	
16 May 2015	Semi Final	Kelantan	A	1-3 (arg 2–3)	R. Gopinathan 57'	14,253	

== AFC Cup ==
=== Group stage ===
Pos	Team	Pld	W	D	L	GF	GA	GD	Pts	Qualification	SCA	PAH	GLO	YAD
1	(Hong Kong) South China	6	6	0	0	19	3	+16	18	Advance to knockout stage	—	3–1	3–0	3–1
2	(Malaysia) Pahang	6	2	2	2	11	10	+1	8	Advance to knockout stage	0–1	—	0–0	7–4
3	(Philippines) Global	6	1	2	3	5	12	−7	5		1–6	0–0	—	4–1
4	(Myanmar) Yadanarbon	6	1	0	5	10	20	−10	3		0–3	2–3	2–0	—

Source: AFC
Rules for classification: Group stage tiebreakers

25 February 2015 Group stage	Yadanarbon (Myanmar)	2–3	(Malaysia) Pahang	Mandalarthiri Stadium, Mandalay
16:00 UTC+6:30	Stewart 35' (o.g.); Djawa 55' (pen.)	Report	Nwakaeme 6', 12'; Gopi 89'	Attendance: 10,115; Referee: Rowan Arumughan (India)

11 March 2015 Group stage	Pahang (Malaysia)	0–0	(Philippines) Global	Darul Makmur Stadium, Kuantan
20:45 UTC+8		Report		Attendance: 7,000; Referee: Kim Hee-gon (South Korea)

18 March 2015 Group stage	Pahang (Malaysia)	0–1	(Hong Kong) South China	Darul Makmur Stadium, Kuantan
20:45 UTC+8		Report	Chan Siu Ki 13'	Attendance: 5,400; Referee: Fu Ming (China)

15 April 2015 Group stage	South China (Hong Kong)	3–1	(Malaysia) Pahang	Mong Kok Stadium, Hong Kong
20:00 UTC+8	Chan Siu Kwan 10'; Lo Kong Wai 53'; Sealy 56'	Report	Nwakaeme 62'	Attendance: 2,820; Referee: Sukhbir Singh (Singapore)

29 April 2015 Group stage	Pahang (Malaysia)	7–4	(Myanmar) Yadanarbon	Darul Makmur Stadium, Kuantan
20:45 UTC+8	Nwakaeme 7', 32', 59'; Conti 18'; Saarvindaran 48', 87'; Hafiz 85'	Report	Djawa 45+1'; Hlaing Bo Bo 58', 68'; Win Naing Soe 90+1'	Attendance: 2,758; Referee: Yu Ming-hsun (Chinese Taipei)

13 May 2015 Group stage	Global (Philippines)	0–0	(Malaysia) Pahang	Philippine Sports Stadium, Bocaue
19:00 UTC+8		Report		Attendance: 2,000; Referee: Tan Hai (China)

=== Knock-out stage ===
26 May 2015 Round of 16	Persipura Jayapura (Indonesia)	Cancelled; 0–3 (Awarded)	(Malaysia) Pahang	Mandala Stadium, Jayapura
15:30 UTC+9		Report		Referee: Adham Makhadmeh (Jordan)

The Persipura Jayapura v Pahang match was not played as scheduled as Pahang players were denied entry into Indonesia due to visa issues. The AFC announced on 10 June 2015 that as a result, Persipura Jayapura forfeited the match and was considered to have lost the match by 3–0, based on the AFC Cup 2015 Competition Regulations and the AFC Disciplinary Code.

21 July 2015	Istiklol (Tajikistan)	4 – 0	(Malaysia) Pahang F.A.	Dushanbe, Tajikistan
18:00 (UTC+8)				Stadium: Pamir Stadium

== First team and squad statistics ==

starting line-up. (4 July 2015) Malaysia Super League

No.	Name	League		FA Cup		Malaysia Cup		AFC Cup		Total		Discipline	
No.	Name	Apps	Goals	Apps	Goals	Apps	Goals	Apps	Goals	Apps	Goals	Yellow card	Red card
Goalkeeper
1	(Malaysia) Khairul Azhan Khalid	15	0	5	0	0	0	6	0	26	0	1	0
22	(Malaysia) Muhammad Saufie Mohamad	0	0	0	0	0	0	0	0	0	0	0	0
23	(Malaysia) Mohd Nasril Nourdin	0	0	1	0	0	0	0	0	0	0	0	0
Defenders
2	(Malaysia) Jalaluddin Jaafar	0	0	0	0	0	0	0	0	0	0	0	0
3	(Malaysia) Mohd Saiful Nizam Miswan	13	0	6	0	0	0	5	0	24	0	2	0
4	(Jamaica) Damion Stewart	15	0	4	0	0	0	6	0	25	0	4	0
5	(Malaysia) Mohammad Abdul Aziz Ismail	0(1)	0	0	0	0	0	0	0	0(1)	0	0	0
6	(Pakistan) Zesh Rehman	14	1	6	0	0	0	6	0	26	1	2	0
13	(Malaysia) Mohd Razman Roslan (captain)	13	0	6	0	0	0	5	0	24	0	1	1
14	(Malaysia) Mohd Faisal Mohd Rosli	0(1)	0	0	0	0(1)	0	0	0	0(2)	0	0	0
16	(Malaysia) Mohd Hazri Rozali	0	0	0	0	0	0	0(1)	0	0(1)	0	0	0
17	(Malaysia) Mohd Zaiza Zainal Abidin	0	0	0(1)	0	0	0	0	0	0(1)	0	0	0
18	(Malaysia) Muhammad Syawal Norsam	0	0	0	0	0	0	0	0	0	0	0	0
20	(Malaysia) Mohd Shahrizan Salleh	4(2)	0	1	0	0	0	4(1)	0	9(3)	0	2	0
20	(Malaysia) Matthew Davies	9	0	1	0	0	0	0	0	10	0	2	0
Midfielders
7	(Malaysia) R. Surendran	1(3)	0	0	0	0	0	1(1)	0	2(4)	0	1	0
8	(Malaysia) Azidan Sarudin	7(6)	2	2(4)	0	0	0	4(1)	0	13(11)	2	0	0
15	(Malaysia) D. Saarvindran	2(3)	1	0(1)	0	0	0	1(1)	2	3(5)	2	1	0
21	(Malaysia) Mohd Hafiz Kamal	13	1	4	0	0	0	6	1	23	2	2	1
24	(Malaysia) R. Gopinathan	14	2	6	1	0	0	4(2)	1	24(2)	4	0	0
25	(Malaysia) Mohd Rizua Shafiqi Kamarulzaman	1(3)	0	1(2)	0	0	0	2(2)	0	4(7)	0	0	0
33	(Malaysia) Mohd Norazam Abdul Azih	6(6)	0	5(1)	0	0	0	5(1)	0	16(8)	0	0	0
Forwards
9	(Argentina) Matías Conti	14	8	5	2	0	0	4	1	23	11	0	0
10	(Nigeria) Dickson Nwakaeme	14	4	6	4	0	0	3(2)	6	26(2)	10	1	0
12	(Malaysia) Mohd Azamuddin Md Akil	9(3)	1	3(2)	0	0	0	2(1)	0	14(6)	1	0	0
19	(Malaysia) Mohd Fauzi Roslan	4(8)	0	2(4)	1	0	0	3(2)	0	7(1)	1	0	0
26	(Malaysia) Mohd Shafie Zahari	0	0	0	0	0	0	0	0	0	0	0	0

=== Scoring records ===
First goal of the season

- Super League: Matías Conti against Selangor (56th minute) (14 February 2015)
- FA Cup: Matías Conti against Johor DT (20th minute) (2 March 2015)
- Malaysia Cup: TBA
- AFC Cup: Dickson Nwakaeme against Yadanarbon (6th minute) (25 February 2015)

Fastest goal of the season

- Super League: D. Saarvindran against PDRM (6th minute) (20 June 2015)
- FA Cup: Matías Conti against Kelantan FA (2nd minute) (9 May 2015)
- Malaysia Cup: TBA
- AFC Cup: Dickson Nwakaeme against Yadanarbon (6th minute) (25 February 2015)

Biggest win

- Super League: against PDRM (5-3) (20 June 2015)
- FA Cup: TBA
- Malaysia Cup: TBA
- AFC Cup: against Yadanarbon (7–4) (29 April 2015)

Biggest loss

- Super League: against Johor DT (0–2) (31 January 2015) against Lions XII [4-2]
- FA Cup: TBA
- Malaysia Cup: against PKNS (1-4)
- AFC Cup: against FC Istiklol [4-0]

=== Clean sheet ===
Rank	Player	Position	Super League	FA Cup	Malaysia Cup	AFC Cup	Total
1	(Malaysia) Khairul Azhan Khalid	GK	6	2	0	2	10
Total			6	2	0	2	10

=== Own goal ===
Rank	Player	Position	Super League	FA Cup	Malaysia Cup	AFC Cup	Total
1	(Jamaica) Damion Stewart	DF	0	0	0	1	1
Total			0	0	0	1	1

== Transfers ==
=== In ===
Date	Pos.	No.	Name	From	Fee
November 2014	DF	5	(Malaysia) Mohammad Abdul Aziz Ismail	(Malaysia) Kelantan FA	Undisclosed
November 2014	MF	15	(Malaysia) D. Saarvindran	(Malaysia) Harimau Muda A	Free
November 2014	MF	35	(Malaysia) Mohd Rizua Shafiqi Kamarulzaman	(Malaysia) Pahang U-21	Undisclosed
November 2014	MF	33	(Malaysia) Muhd Nor Azam Abdul Azih	(Malaysia) Harimau Muda B	Free

=== Out ===
Date	Pos.	No.	Name	To	Fee
November 2014	FW	11	(Malaysia) Mohd Faizol Hussien	(Malaysia) Johor Darul Ta'zim II F.C.	Undisclosed
November 2014	FW		(Malaysia) Mohd Shafizi Mohd Zain	(Malaysia) Real Mulia F.C.	Undisclosed
November 2014	MF		(Malaysia) Mohd Shahrul Aizad Zulkifli	(Malaysia) Kuantan FA	Undisclosed

=== Out on loan ===
Date from	Date to	Pos.	No.	Name	To
November 2014	October 2015	MF		(Malaysia) Abdul Malik Mat Ariff	(Malaysia) Kuantan FA
