= Gopi Rizqi =

Malaysian footballer

Personal information
- Full name: Muhammad Gopi Rizqi Rama Chandra
- Date of birth: 15 December 1989 (age 36)
- Place of birth: Kuantan, Malaysia
- Height: 1.75 m (5 ft 9 in)
- Position: Winger

Team information
- Current team: Kuala Lumpur Rovers
- Number: 17

Youth career
- 2009–2010: Pahang

Senior career*
Years	Team	Apps	(Gls)
2010–2015	Pahang	69	(15)
2016	Selangor	18	(5)
2017–2018	Johor Darul Ta'zim	2	(1)
2018	→ Melaka United (loan)	17	(4)
2019	PDRM	9	(2)
2020	Pahang	9	(0)
2021	Sarawak United	23	(2)
2022	→ Penang (loan)	0	(0)
2023–	Kuala Lumpur Rovers	0	(0)

International career^{‡}
2012–2015	Malaysia	6	(0)
Medal record
Malaysia
Asean Football Championship
Runner-up	AFF Suzuki Cup 2014	2014
- * Club domestic league appearances and goals as of 26 March 2023 ‡ National team caps and goals as of 17 November 2016

Muhammad Gopi Rizqi Rama Chandra (born 15 December 1989 in Kuantan, Pahang) also known as Gopinathan, is a Malaysian footballer who plays as a winger for Malaysia A1 Semi-Pro League club Kuala Lumpur Rovers.

== Club career ==
=== Pahang ===
The 23-year-old from Kuantan has been in top form for Pahang, having scored three goals in the 2012 Malaysia Premier League and help Pahang gain promotion to 2013 Malaysia Super League and 1 goal in 2012 Malaysia Cup but lost in quarter-finals beaten by LionsXII.

=== Johor Darul Ta'zim ===
On 27 December 2016, Gopinathan signed a contract with Johor Darul Ta'zim from Selangor for an undisclosed fee. He made his debut in a 7–0 victory against Melaka United on 9 April 2017. Overall, Gopinathan only played in five matches for the club, three in the AFC Cup and two in the Malaysia Super League with a total duration of 286 minutes. He scored one goal in AFC Cup over Magwe.

=== Melaka United ===
On 21 November 2017, Gopinathan was loaned to Melaka United on a season-long loan move from Johor Darul Ta'zim. Gopinathan made his debut in a 2–1 win over Kelantan coming from the bench on 3 February 2018. On 11 February, he scored his first league goal in a 3–0 win over Negeri Sembilan at home. Gopinathan scored two more goals in a league match to help his club beat Kedah on 10 July. On 18 July, he scored the first goal in Melaka's 2–2 draw against Pahang.

== International career ==
In October 2012, Gopinathan is among the national team's recruits for the friendly against Hong Kong at the Mong Kok Stadium

National coach Datuk K. Rajagopal at that time, was preparing the team for the 2012 AFF Suzuki Cup in November.

== Style of play ==
Gopinathan known as the lightning sprinter because of his speed and dribbling ability on the field and can use both feet to cross the ball.

== Personal life ==
On 9 October 2019, he converted to Islam and took the Islamic name Muhammad Gopi Rizqi Rama Chandra, so that he can marry his Malay Muslim wife. The pair have a daughter together.

== Career statistics ==
=== Club ===
As of 28 July 2018

Appearances and goals by club, season and competition
Club	Season	League			Cup		League Cup		Continental		Total	
Club	Season	Division	Apps	Goals	Apps	Goals	Apps	Goals	Apps	Goals	Apps	Goals
Pahang	2010	Malaysia Super League	0	0	0	0	0	0	0	0	0	0
Pahang	2011	Malaysia Super League	0	0	0	0	—		—		0	0
Pahang	2012	Malaysia Premier League	0	3	0	0	0	1	—		30	4
Pahang	2013	Malaysia Super League	0	5	0	1	0	3	—		0	9
Pahang	2014	Malaysia Super League	0	2	0	0	0	4	—		0	6
Pahang	2015	Malaysia Super League	0	2	0	2	0	1	8	1	0	6
Pahang	Total		0	12	0	3	0	9	8	1	0	25
Selangor	2016	Malaysia Super League	18	5	1	0	10	4	4	1	33	10
Selangor	Total		18	5	1	0	10	4	4	1	33	10
Johor Darul Ta'zim	2017	Malaysia Super League	2	0	0	0	0	0	3	1	5	1
Johor Darul Ta'zim	Total		2	0	0	0	0	0	3	1	5	1
Melaka United (loan)	2018	Malaysia Super League	17	4	2	1	0	0	—		19	5
Melaka United (loan)	Total		17	4	2	1	0	0	0	0	19	5
Career total			0	0	0	0	0	0	0	0	0	0

=== International ===
As of match played 28 June 2018

Appearances and goals by national team and year
National team	Year	Apps	Goals
Malaysia	2012	3	0
Malaysia	2014	2	0
Malaysia	2015	1	0
Total		6	0

== Honours ==
Pahang

- Malaysia FA Cup: 2014
- Malaysia Cup: 2013, 2014
- Malaysia Charity Shield: 2014

Johor Darul Ta'zim

- Malaysia Super League: 2017
- Malaysia Cup: 2017
