= Irfan Bakti Abu Salim =

Malaysian football coach (born 1951)

Irfan Bakti
Personal information
- Full name: Irfan Bakti bin Abu Salim
- Date of birth: 1 April 1951 (age 75)
- Place of birth: Perak, Malaysia
- Position: Midfielder

Senior career*
Years	Team	Apps	(Gls)
1971–1974	Kelantan FA		
1975–1977	ATM FA		

International career
1976	Malaysia	2	(0)

Managerial career
- 1994–1995: Malaysia (assistant)
- 1996: Malaysia Deaf
- 1996–1997: Malaysia (assistant)
- 1997: Malaysia U23
- 1999–2000: Negeri Sembilan FA
- 2001–2003: Penang FA
- 2004–2007: TM Melaka
- 2007: Persipura Jayapura
- 2008: Perlis FA
- 2009–2011: Terengganu FA
- 2012–2013: Selangor FA
- 2013–2016: Felda United
- 2017–2019: Terengganu FA
- 2021–2023: Kuching City
- 2025–: Kelantan Red Warrior
- * Club domestic league appearances and goals

Irfan Bakti Abu Salim is a Malaysian football coach, currently coaching the Malaysia A1 Semi-Pro League club Kelantan Red Warrior.

== Playing career ==
He had played with Kelantan FA and ATM FA in 1970s. He also was in the Malaysia squad for the 1976 AFC Asian Cup in Tehran, Iran.

== Coaching career ==
=== Beginnings ===
He spent most of his early coaching days as a coach with the Football Association of Malaysia in Wisma FAM. He first worked as a state coach with the Negri Sembilan team, and later joined Penang FA and TMFC respectively. In 2007, he suddenly resigned from TMFC to coach an Indonesian team, Persipura Jayapura. He returned to Malaysian football in 2008, joining Perlis FA. He later left Perlis and joined Terengganu FA for the 2010/11 season. He was the head coach of Selangor FA from 2012 until his resignation in 2013.

=== Felda ===
Irfan was unveiled as new coach of Felda United in November 2013.

With Felda, he guided them to the 2014 Malaysia FA Cup Final, where they lost 2–1 to Pahang, conceding goals at the last minute after leading for the long period of the game. Felda continued their revitalized season by performing well in that year's Malaysia Cup with a win against a strong Johor Darul Ta'zim team at rainy muddy pitch of MPS Stadium by 4–3, but lost in the second leg of the semi-final. In the domestic campaign they finished second which saw only PDRM managed to prevented them from winning the Malaysia second tier division.

In 2015, Felda finished the season in 5th placed and make it to semi final of Malaysia cup.

In 2016, Felda ended the season as runners-up, their best position ever since inception. But Irfan left the team at the end of the season to take the head coach position of Terengganu for the second time.

=== Terengganu ===
Irfan was tasked to bring back Terengganu to their glory days after number of coached comes in comes out end up with poor tactical, bad result cost the team relegation to premier league. Their best achievement was when Irfan was their head coach by winning the 2011 FA cup, super league & Malaysia cup runners up in 1 single season. On 20 October 2018, he managed to bring Terengganu advance to the 2018 Malaysia Cup final when Terengganu beaten heavily favourite Johor Darul Ta'zim (JDT) with 3–2 score aggregate but loss to Perak in penalty shootout (4-1).

== Achievements ==
=== Kelantan FA ===
FAM Cup
- 1971, 1972 (runner-up)
Kings Gold Cup
- 1972, 1973 (runner-up)

=== Malaysia U23 ===
Bangabandhu Cup
- 1997

=== Penang FA ===
FA Cup Malaysia
- 2000 (runner-up), 2002
Malaysia Charity Shield (champion)
- 2003
Malaysia Super League
- 2000, 2001 (runner-up)

=== Perlis FA ===
Malaysia Charity Shield
- 2008 (champion)

=== Terengganu FA ===
FA Cup Malaysia
- 2011 (champion)
Malaysia Cup
- 2011, 2018 (runner-up)

Malaysia Super League

- 2011 (runner-up)

=== Felda ===
Malaysia Premier League
- 2014 (runner-up)
FA Cup Malaysia
- 2014 (runner-up)
Malaysia Super League
- 2016 (runner-up)

=== Individual ===
National Football Award

- Best coach: 2011
