= Fauzi Roslan =

Malaysian footballer

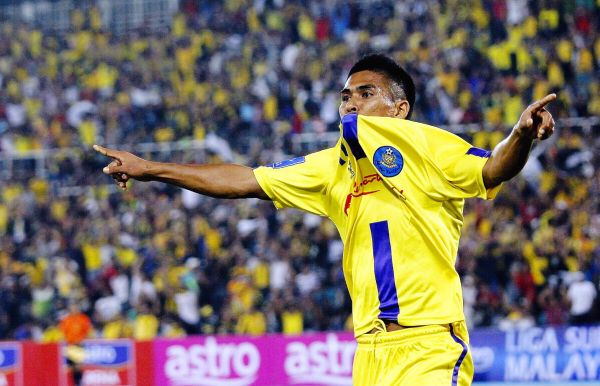
- Fauzi celebrating his goal against Darul Takzim FC.

Personal information
- Full name: Muhammad Fauzi bin Roslan
- Date of birth: 27 August 1988 (age 38)
- Place of birth: Pekan, Pahang, Malaysia
- Height: 1.64 m (5 ft 4 1/2 in)
- Positions: Winger; forward

Team information
- Current team: YPM FC (assistant)

Youth career
- 2007–2009: Pahang FA

Senior career*
Years	Team	Apps	(Gls)
2010–2011	Pahang	28	(24)
2011–2012	Shahzan Muda	30	(29)
2012–2016	Pahang	63	(38)
2017–2018	Melaka United	33	(7)
2019	Kelantan	15	(1)
2020	Sarawak United	8	(0)
2022	YPM FC		

International career^{‡}
2013	Malaysia	1	(0)
- * Club domestic league appearances and goals ‡ National team caps and goals as of January 3, 2016

Muhammad Fauzi bin Roslan (born 27 August 1988), commonly known as Kojie, is a Malaysian former professional footballer. He played mainly as a forward or winger.

== Club career ==
=== Shahzan Muda, Pahang ===
He previously played for Shahzan Muda and Pahang before signed with Melaka United for 2017 season. A product of a local talent, he is known for agility, acceleration and strength and being described as "sharp and clever". Combined with his close control and strength to keep the ball, he is described as a menace in the box. On 3 November 2013, he assisted Pahang to defeat Kelantan 0–1 in the Malaysian Cup final which ends Pahang's 21 years drought of the cup.

=== Melaka United ===
On 16 November 2016, it was announced that Fauzi has agreed to join Melaka United from Pahang. On 21 February 2017, he made his league debut and scored one goal in a 2–0 win over Kelantan.

== International career ==
In January 2013, Malaysia coach K. Rajagobal has called up Fauzi for opening 2015 AFC Asian Cup qualifier against Qatar on 6 February, after impressive starts to the new Malaysia Super League campaign, who has already netted thrice this season. Malaysia will warm up for the clash with Qatar with a friendly against Iraq on 1 February.

== Career statistics ==
=== Club ===
As of 20 July 2019

Appearances and goals by club, season and competition
Club	Season	League			Cup		League Cup		Continental		Total	
Club	Season	Division	Apps	Goals	Apps	Goals	Apps	Goals	Apps	Goals	Apps	Goals
Pahang	2013	Malaysia Super League	21	8	6	2	5	1	0	0	32	11
Pahang	2014	Malaysia Super League	0	0	0	0	0	0	0	0	0	0
Pahang	2015	Malaysia Super League	0	0	0	0	0	0	0	0	0	0
Pahang	2016	Malaysia Super League	0	0	0	0	0	0	0	0	0	0
Pahang	Total		0	0	0	0	0	0	–	–	0	0
Melaka United	2017	Malaysia Super League	20	3	2	0	8	3	0	0	30	6
Melaka United	2018	Malaysia Super League	13	0	2	1	0	0	0	0	15	1
Melaka United	Total		33	3	4	1	8	3	–	–	45	7
Kelantan	2019	Malaysia Premier League	15	1	1	0	4	3	0	0	20	4
Kelantan	Total		15	1	1	0	4	3	–	–	20	4
Career Total			0	0	0	0	0	0	–	–	0	0

== Honours ==
=== Club ===
Pahang

- Malaysia Cup (2): 2013, 2014
- FA Cup (1): 2014
- Malaysian Charity Shield (1): 2014
- Piala Emas Raja-Raja (1): 2011
