= Saifulnizam Miswan =

Malaysian footballer

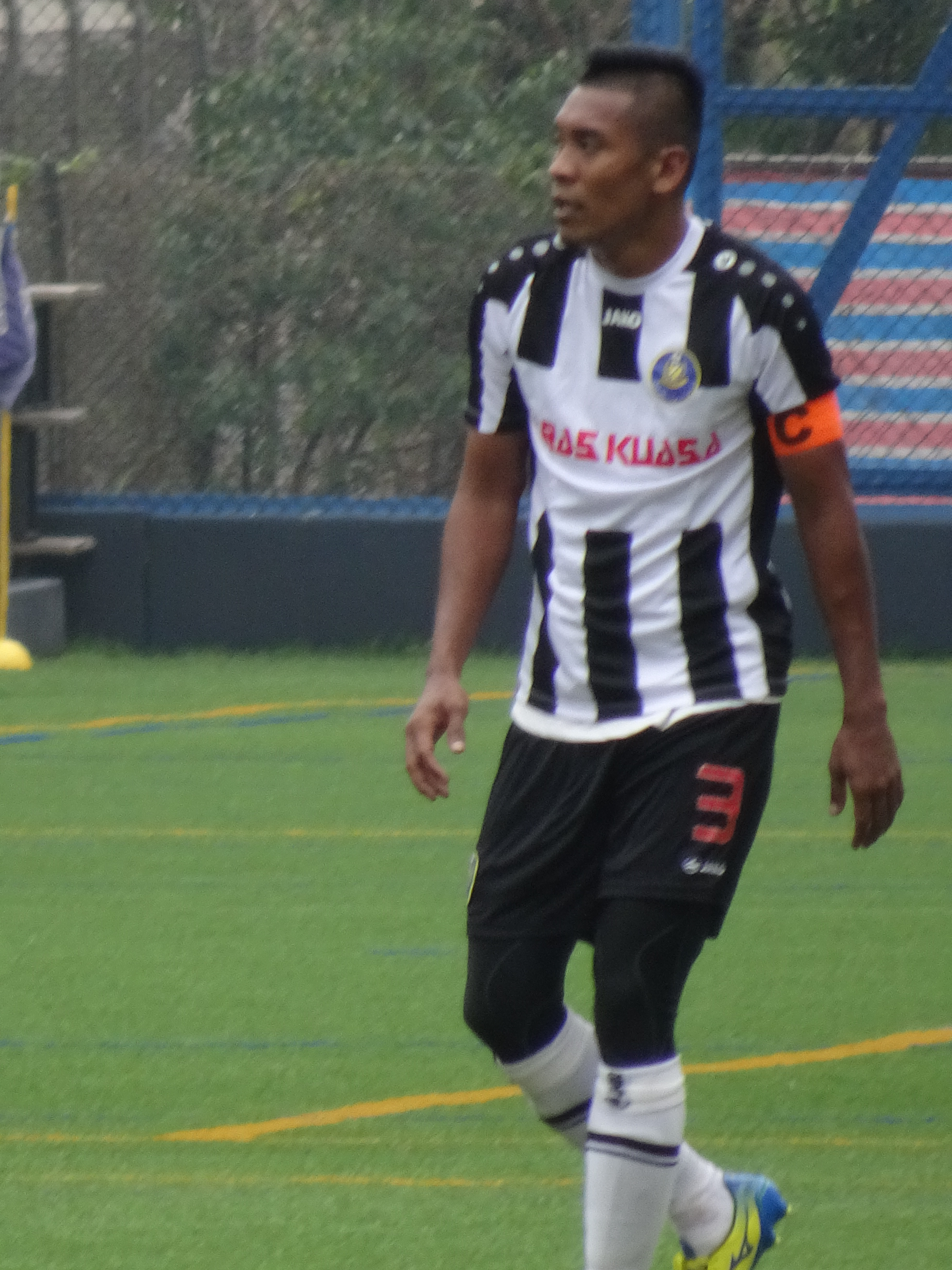
- Saifulnizam playing for Pahang

Personal information
- Full name: Mohd Saifulnizam bin Miswan
- Date of birth: 3 March 1981 (age 45)
- Place of birth: Kota Tinggi, Malaysia
- Height: 1.76 m (5 ft 9 1/2 in)
- Position: Defender

Team information
- Current team: Kuala Lumpur
- Number: 3

Senior career*
Years	Team	Apps	(Gls)
2003–2004	Johor FC	6	(0)
2005–2007	Johor	19	(0)
2007–2008	ATM	21	(0)
2009–2017	Pahang	99	(8)
2018	Kuala Lumpur	9	(0)
2019	Batu Dua		
2020	MPPG SC		
- * Club domestic league appearances and goals as of 22 July 2018

Mohd Saifulnizam bin Miswan (born 3 March 1981) is a Malaysian football player who plays as a defender for Kuala Lumpur. Saifulnizam spent nine seasons in Pahang winning domestic cups before moving to Kuala Lumpur in 2018.

== Career statistics ==
=== Club ===
As of 22 July 2018

Club	Season	League		Cup		League Cup		Continental		Total	
Club	Season	Apps	Goals	Apps	Goals	Apps	Goals	Apps	Goals	Apps	Goals
Pahang	2009	0	0	0	0	0	0	–	–	0	0
Pahang	2010	0	0	0	0	0	0	–	–	0	0
Pahang	2011	22	1	0	0	0	0	–	–	0	0
Pahang	2012	3	2	0	0	0	0	–	–	0	0
Pahang	2013	0	0	0	0	0	0	–	–	0	0
Pahang	2014	0	3	0	0	0	0	–	–	0	0
Pahang	2015	13	0	6	0	0	0	7	0	26	0
Pahang	2016	17	0	1	0	0	0	–	–	0	0
Pahang	2017	8	0	0	0	5	0	–	–	13	0
Pahang	Total	0	0	0	0	0	0	0	0	0	0
Kuala Lumpur	2018	9	0	0	0	0	0	–	–	9	0
Kuala Lumpur	Total	9	0	0	0	0	0	0	0	9	0
Career total		0	0	0	0	0	0	0	0	0	0

== Honours ==
=== Club ===
Pahang

- Malaysia Cup: 2013, 2014
- Malaysia FA Cup: 2014
