= 2012 Malaysia FA Cup final =

- Event: 2012 Malaysia FA Cup
Sime Darby	Kelantan
(Kuala Lumpur)	(Kelantan)
0	1
- Date: 19 May 2012
- Venue: National Stadium, Bukit Jalil, Kuala Lumpur
- Man of the Match: Es Lizuan Zahid (Sime Darby)
- Man of the Match: Mohammed Ghaddar
- Referee: Suhaizi Shukri (Kuala Lumpur)
- Attendance: 85,000

The 2012 Malaysia FA Cup final was a football match which was played on 19 May 2012, to determine the champion of the 2012 Malaysia FA Cup. It was the final of the 23rd edition of the Malaysia FA Cup, competition organised by the Football Association of Malaysia.

The final was played between Sime Darby and Kelantan. Kelantan has won their first Malaysia FA Cup title, after winning the match 1–0.

== Venue ==
The final was held at the National Stadium, Bukit Jalil in Kuala Lumpur.

== Match details ==
Saturday, 19 May
20:45 UTC+08:00

Sime Darby (Kuala Lumpur)	0–1	Kelantan
	Report	Ghaddar 59' (pen.)

National Stadium, Bukit Jalil, Kuala Lumpur
Attendance: 85,000
Referee: Suhaizi Shukri (Kuala Lumpur)

Sime Darby	Kelantan

GK	25	(Malaysia) Redzuan Harun
DF	2	(Malaysia) Azmirul Azmi
DF	3	(Malaysia) Es Lizuan Zahid (c)
DF	5	(Malaysia) Arif Ismail
DF	6	(Malaysia) Fairuz Abdul Aziz
MF	12	(Malaysia) Shoufiq Khusaini
MF	14	(Brazil) Leandro Teofilo
MF	8	(Malaysia) Shazlan Alias
MF	17	(Malaysia) Faiz Isa
FW	4	(Liberia) Patrick Wleh
FW	19	(Malaysia) Mohamad Nor Ismail
Substitutes
GK	1	(Malaysia) Hafiz Samsuddin
DF	8	(Malaysia) Syukur Saidin
DF	23	(Malaysia) Nuraliff Zainal Abidin
MF	15	(Malaysia) Hairul Nizam
MF	13	(Malaysia) Asrol Ibrahim
FW	22	(Malaysia) Razali Umar
Coach
(Malaysia) Ismail Zakaria

GK	19	(Malaysia) Khairul Fahmi
DF	15	(Malaysia) Daudsu Jamaluddin
DF	3	(Malaysia) S. Subramaniam
DF	4	(Nigeria) Obinna Nwaneri
DF	24	(Malaysia) Zairul Fitree
MF	23	(Malaysia) S. Chanturu
MF	8	(Malaysia) Shakir Shaari
MF	16	(Malaysia) Badhri Radzi (c)
MF	13	(Malaysia) Indra Putra Mahayuddin
FW	9	(Malaysia) Norshahrul Idlan Talaha
FW	22	(Lebanon) Mohammed Ghaddar
Substitutes
GK	21	(Malaysia) Shahrizan Ismail
DF	6	(Malaysia) Farisham Ismail
DF	17	(Malaysia) Rizal Fahmi Rosid
MF	12	(Malaysia) Nurul Azwan Roya
MF	10	(Malaysia) Nor Farhan Muhammad
FW	25	(Malaysia) Azlan Ismail
Coach
(Croatia) Bojan Hodak

Assistant referees:
Yusri Mohamad (Malaysia)
Ismail (Malaysia)
Fourth official:
(Malaysia)

Match rules

- 90 minutes.
- 30 minutes of extra time if necessary.
- Penalty shoot-out if scores still level.
- Seven named substitutes.
- Maximum of three substitutions.
