= Coxixola =

- Municipality
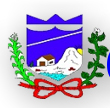
- Coat of arms

- Location in Paraíba state

- Location in Brazil
- Coordinates: 7°37′S 36°37′W
- Country: Brazil
- Region: Northeast
- State: Paraíba

Area
  - Total: 113.6 km^{2} (43.9 sq mi)

Population (2020)
  - Total: 1,935
  - Density: 17.03/km^{2} (44.12/sq mi)
- Time zone: UTC−3 (BRT)
- Website: www.coxixola.pb.gov.br

Coxixola (Central northeastern portuguese pronunciation: [kuʃiˈʃɔlɐ]) is the smallest municipality located in Paraíba state, Brazil. The population is 1,935 people (2020). The total area is 113.6 km². Coxixola was a district firstly of São João do Cariri-PB and after of Serra Branca-PB until 1994 when it became a municipality itself.

The word coxixola means to build a small house using clay bricks in the Tupi-Guarany Indian language.
