= Zesh Rehman =

Pakistani professional footballer

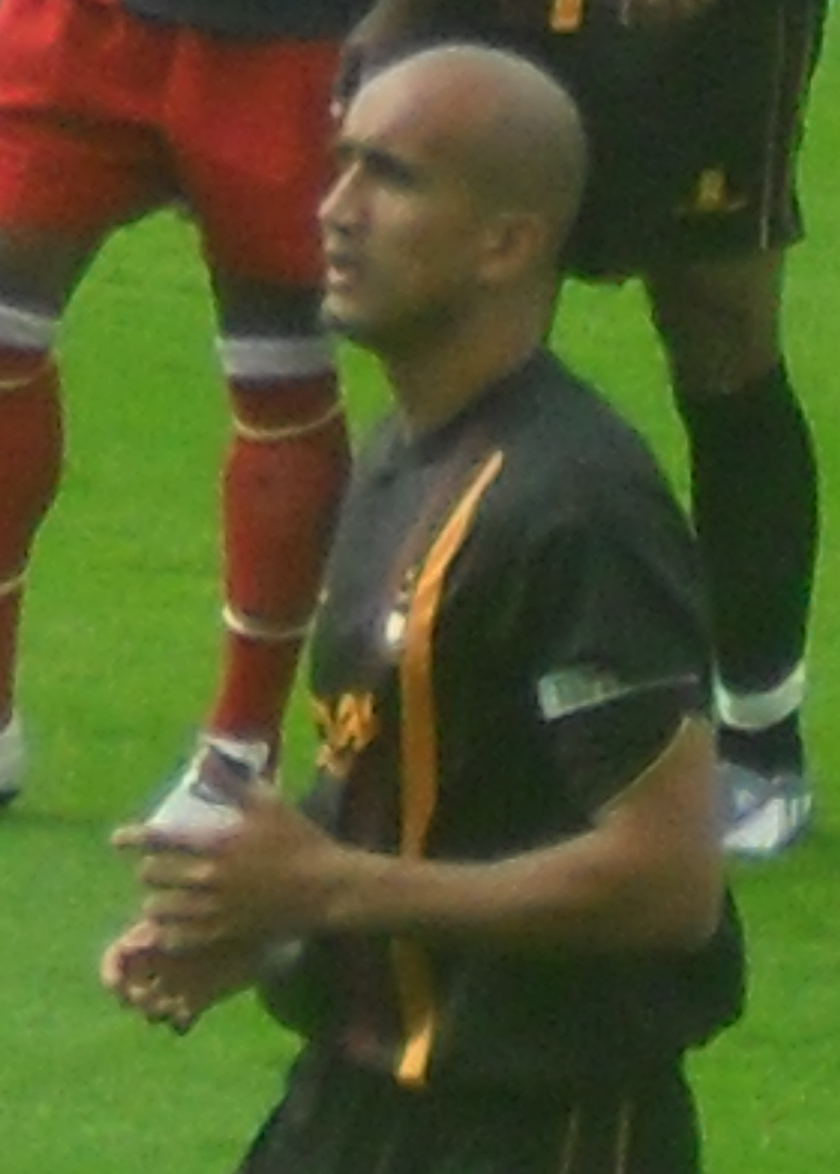
- Rehman with Bradford City in 2009

Personal information
- Full name: Zeshan Rehman
- Date of birth: 14 October 1983 (age 43)
- Place of birth: Birmingham, England
- Height: 6 ft 3 in (1.91 m)
- Position: Defender

Youth career
- 1995–2003: Fulham

Senior career*
Years	Team	Apps	(Gls)
2003–2006	Fulham	21	(0)
2003–2004	→ Brighton & Hove Albion (loan)	11	(2)
2006	→ Norwich City (loan)	5	(0)
2006–2009	Queens Park Rangers	46	(0)
2007	→ Brighton & Hove Albion (loan)	15	(0)
2008	→ Blackpool (loan)	3	(0)
2009	→ Bradford City (loan)	17	(0)
2009–2010	Bradford City	46	(2)
2011–2012	Muangthong United	30	(1)
2012–2013	Kitchee	30	(0)
2014–2016	Pahang	53	(7)
2017	Gillingham	10	(0)
2017–2022	Southern	67	(1)
Total		354	(14)

International career
- England U18
- England U19
- England U20
2005–2019	Pakistan	22	(1)

Managerial career
- 2020–2022: Southern (player-manager)
- 2022–2023: Portsmouth U18
- * Club domestic league appearances and goals

Zeshan Rehman (Urdu: ذيشان رحمان; born 14 October 1983) is a former professional footballer who played as a defender. Born in England, he represented the Pakistan national team. He was the first British Asian to start a Premier League match and is the first to have played in all four divisions of professional football in England.

Rehman started his career at Fulham and made a total of 30 appearances, having loan spells at Brighton & Hove Albion and Norwich City. A transfer to Queens Park Rangers followed and he went on to make 50 appearances for the club. During his three years there he went on loan to Brighton & Hove Albion, Blackpool and Bradford City, moving permanently to the latter on a free transfer in June 2009.

Having previously represented England at under-18, under-19 and under-20 levels, in 2005 he made his debut for Pakistan national team.

== Early life ==
Rehman was born on 14 October 1983 in Birmingham. His father is Khalid Rehman. As a child in Birmingham he played for his local Sunday league team, Kingshurst. He was brought up in the Aston area of the city and often played football on the streets in addition to representing his school, his district and his county in football.

== Club career ==
=== Fulham ===
==== Early years ====
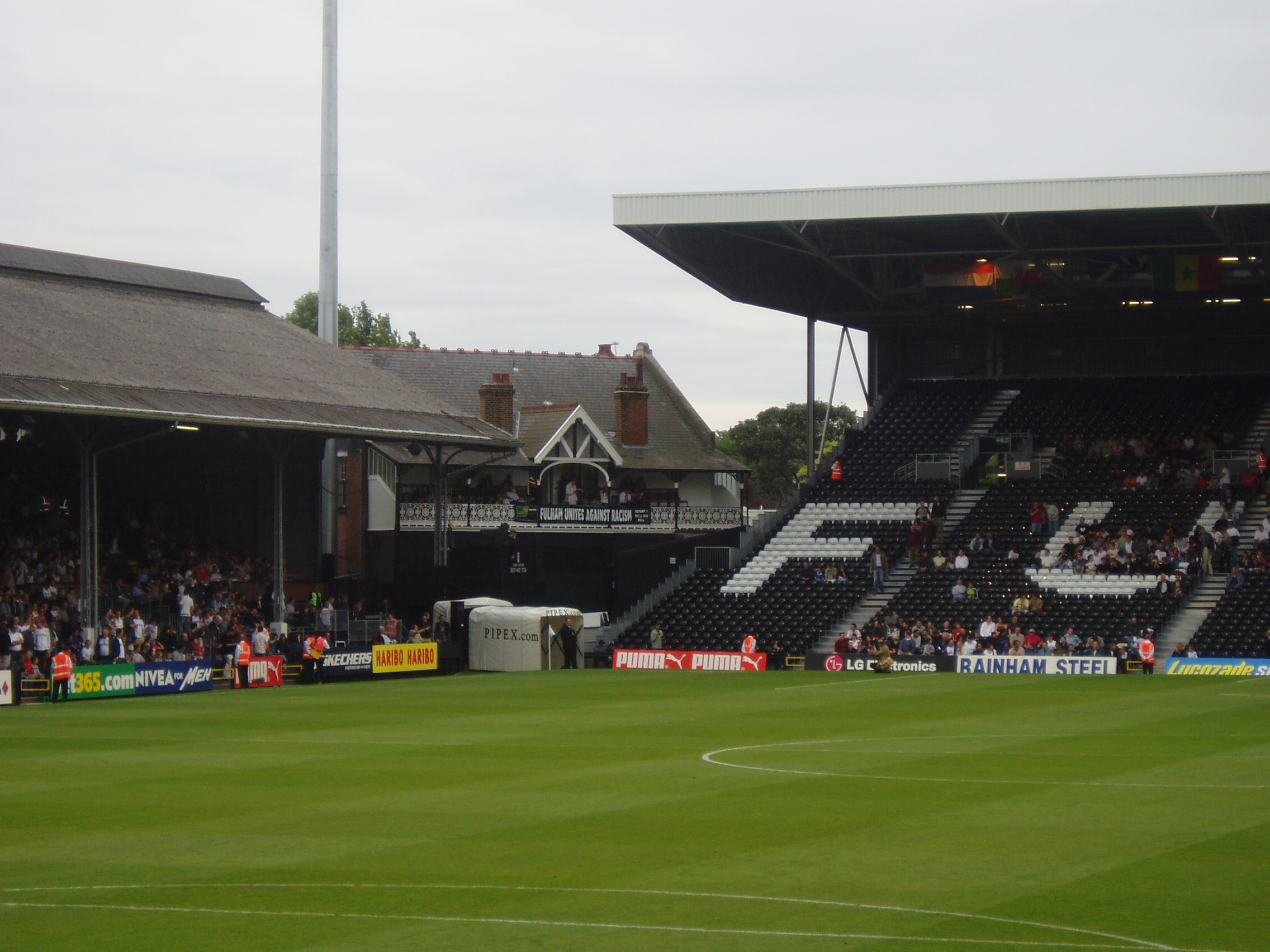
Rehman started his career at Craven Cottage

When he was just twelve years old he was spotted by a scout, and moved with his family to London where he joined the Fulham Academy. He progressed through the junior, youth and reserve teams at Fulham, which led him to sign his first professional contract. Although a centre back by trade, Rehman was used as a holding midfielder as well as right back in his career at Fulham.

==== 2003–04 ====
In the 2003–04 season, Rehman made his professional debut on 23 September 2003 in a 1–0 defeat away to Wigan Athletic in the second round of the Football League Cup, coming on as a substitute for Junichi Inamoto after 57 minutes. Six days later, he was sent on loan to Brighton & Hove Albion of the Second Division, initially for one month until November. He scored on his debut for the club on 30 September, concluding a 3–1 away win at Rushden & Diamonds. On 11 October, he opened a 3–0 win against Grimsby Town at the Withdean Stadium, finishing a corner by Leon Knight in Bob Booker's first match in charge. Rehman's loan was extended to three months ending in January 2004. He made eleven league appearances, scoring two goals.

He made his Premier League debut for Fulham in a goalless draw at Anfield against Liverpool on 17 April 2004, replacing Bobby Petta for the final minute of the match. In doing so, he garnered media attention from British Asian groups by being the first British Asian player to play in the top division of English football. In June, Rehman signed a new contract, to keep him until 2006.

==== 2005–06 ====
On 21 September 2005 in the League Cup second round, Rehman scored his only goal for Fulham, opening a 5–4 extra-time win over Lincoln City at Craven Cottage by heading in Heiðar Helguson's cross. In January 2006 he signed for Championship club Norwich City on loan for the rest of the season as defensive cover for the club. He made five starts for them. Having made 30 appearances in all competitions for Fulham, 26 from the starting line-up and four as a substitute, Rehman had to consider his options if he was to get regular football. Although he had two years remaining on his contract, he wanted to play regular first team football, and as a result, he decided to spend the next two seasons getting as much experience as possible.

=== Queens Park Rangers ===
On 8 August 2006, just prior to the start of the 2006–07 season, Rehman signed for Championship club Queens Park Rangers (QPR) from Fulham on a three-year contract for an undisclosed fee. In his first season at QPR, Rehman made 27 appearances.

Towards the end of the season Rehman was sent on loan to former club Brighton & Hove Albion for a month where he gained more first team football experience. He made his debut on 24 March 2007 in a 0–0 draw against Huddersfield Town. He ended his loan stint by playing the full 90 minutes, and earning a yellow card in the process, for the final game of the League One season in a 1–1 draw at Cheltenham Town on 5 May 2007, claiming an assist for the opening goal. He featured in eight full games during his loan spell.

Returning to QPR at the start of the new season, chances were limited. The 3–1 victory over Leicester City on New Years Day 2008 was Rehman's 50th game in all competitions since leaving Fulham in 2006. Rehman finished the 2007–08 season in the starting line for QPR against the Championship's new champions, West Bromwich Albion.

==== Blackpool (loan) ====
Rehman joined Blackpool in a six-month loan deal on 31 July 2008, along with teammate Daniel Nardiello, who joined the club on a permanent basis, while Blackpool defender Kaspars Gorkšs moved to QPR in exchange. He made his debut for Blackpool as a second-half substitute for Jermaine Wright in a 2–0 defeat at League Two club Macclesfield Town in the first round of the 2008–09 League Cup on 12 August 2008. He was used as an emergency striker due to injuries to three of the club's strikers. He made his league debut the following Saturday, in a 1–1 draw at Norwich City, coming on early in the second half to replace defender Danny Coid.

Three months into his loan spell, in early October, Rehman said of his move to play for Blackpool: "I'm quite glad to get away from all the hustle and bustle of London. I really like it up here in Blackpool; it's a good club with an ambitious young manager. Hopefully, over the next few months I can convince Simon Grayson I'm worthy of a long-term contract." On 31 December he returned to QPR after having made three league appearances, all of which were as a substitute.

==== Bradford City (loan) ====
On 26 January 2009, Rehman signed a loan deal with League Two club Bradford City, which was to last until the end of the 2008–09 season. Rehman had turned down a chance to move to Luton Town and team up with Mick Harford, who was previously the assistant manager at QPR, and said he was only prepared to drop down to League Two if he joined Bradford City. Rehman said of the move, "I was only prepared to drop down the leagues to play for this club. I spoke to the manager and chairmen and I know they want to get Bradford back up to where they belong. I've been involved in relegation battles in the past and it's nice to be joining a club pushing for promotion – that's a good pressure to have." He made his debut the following day in a 1–0 defeat to Bury at Gigg Lane, and in doing so became the first British Asian to play in all four divisions of professional football in England. He made his home debut on 31 January, playing at right back, in a 2–0 home win over Grimsby Town at Valley Parade. In March he turned down the chance to play for Pakistan in the Asian Football Confederation Challenge Cup qualifiers in order to help Bradford's push for promotion.

=== Bradford City ===
After leaving QPR on 19 May 2009, Rehman signed a two-year deal with Bradford City on 19 June, saying of the move, "My gut feeling told me to sign for Bradford and I've absolutely no regrets. From day one I felt at home here. I'm fortunate enough to have played in all the divisions and I see this as the next step of my journey." The Bradford manager, Stuart McCall also revealed that Rehman had taken a large pay cut by joining the club, adding, "Zesh is certainly not signing for Bradford for money—he wants to be a success here, and it will be great to have him on board." He scored his first goal for the club in a 2–2 draw with Barnet on 19 September 2009.

Rehman captained the club during the 2009–10 season and went on to play 42 games. He won the PFA Player in the Community awards on 25 March at The Football League Awards.

At the start of the following season new manager Peter Taylor kept Rehman as club captain hailing him a "supremely professional individual and a superb ambassador for the football club". Struggling to get playing time, making only 12 appearances, Rehman in an interview to BBC Radio said that he was not pleased to sit in the substitute bench in the past few matches. He also added that being the skipper of the team, his experience would help the team to perform. For making these comments, he was stripped of his captainship and put in the transfer list.

=== Muangthong United ===
Rehman signed a two-year deal with Thai Premier League side Muangthong United on 19 December 2010. He made his debut on 30 January 2011, in the King's Trophy against Chonburi Sharks at the Suphachalasai Stadium; his new side lost 2–1. His appearance made him the first Pakistan international to play in Thailand. About his debut Rehman commented "I can honestly say I loved the experience. The passion from the 40,000 fans in the crowd made it a day to remember". During his stint in the club, it was managed by English striker Robbie Fowler. He made a total of thirty league appearances for the Thai club.

=== Kitchee ===
Rehman signed a deal with Hong Kong First Division League side Kitchee on 11 January 2012. He made his debut in a 2–1 win over Sun Hei on 31 January. Rehman scored his first goal for his new club in the AFC Cup against Sông Lam Nghệ An of Vietnam. Rehman won his first piece of silverware of his Hong Kong career by playing a leading role in Kitchees 2–1 League Cup win over close rivals TSW Pegasus at the Mong Kok Stadium on 15 April 2012. Rehman helped Kitchee retain the Hong Kong First Division League title with a 4–1 victory over Biu Chun Rangers in the last league game to clinch the title, it was his second trophy for the club and it put them in pole position to complete the domestic treble in Hong Kong Rehman and Kitchee finished the season in impressive fashion by overcoming Pegasus after penalties to win Hong Kong FA Cup Final at The Hong Kong Stadium. The victory was a historic moment for the club as Kitchee were crowned domestic treble winners, a feat that has never been matched by a Hong Kong club. Rehman made it into the Hong Kong BMA First Division League team of the season at The HKFA Annual Awards dinner. Rehman also achieved the feat of becoming the first Pakistani player to play in AFC Cup.

On 29 August 2012 Rehman played the full game in a pre-season friendly against Premier League giants Arsenal in front of a 40,000 crowd as the Hong Kong Champions drew 2–2 with the Gunners at The Hong Kong Stadium. On 11 May 2013 Rehman won the Hong Kong FA Cup through a 1–0 victory over last year finalist Sun Pegasus FC. On 26 May 2013 Rehman helped Kitchee beat Tuen Mun 3–0 in the final of the play-off to ensure his teams passage into the AFC Cup 2014. Rehman played fifteen league games for the club during the 2012/13 season, which was followed by six appearances in the next season.

=== Pahang FA ===
In December 2013, Rehman signed for Malaysian club Pahang FA on a two-year contract. His former club Kitchee's president Ken Ng commented "Zesh has contributed hugely to Kitchee's success over the last 2 years and he will be truly missed". His new club's manager Zainal Abidin Hassan said that they were "delighted" as he "has chosen to come to Pahang ahead of several other teams." He justified his reason of joining the club as "his destiny". In his first season with the club, he won three trophies – Malaysia FA Cup, Malaysia Cup and Piala Sumbangsih thus winning qualification to the 2015 AFC Cup. In the cup, he played six times without scoring a goal.

"Zesh served as an excellent player for Pahang for 3 years in a successful trophy winning team. His example and leadership to the young and local players was outstanding. The door for a future return is open anytime. We would love to see him back in a coaching role one day".

— Pahang FC CEO and Vice President Datuk Akbar V V Abu.

On 28 June 2016, Zesh announce via his social media accounts he had amicably agreed to terminate with Pahang FC after a successful 3-year spell at the club. Zesh said, "I would love a future return in a coaching role, something which was offered to me at the start of this season but was not the right moment for me. I will be back to visit my sons birthplace of Kuantan. Pahang have the best fans in Malaysia & are by far the best I have played for. Leaving here on excellent terms with the hierarchy, fantastic memories & many formed friendships. Good luck to all the staff & team for the rest of the season. Thank you".

=== Gillingham ===
On 23 February 2017, Rehman returned to English football by joining League One side Gillingham until the end of the 2016-17 season. Rehman made his debut for the club in a 2–1 Victory over Southend, drawing praise from manager Adrian Pennock for his performance and leadership after helping Gillingham avoid relegation from League One on the final day of the season with a 0-0 draw at Northampton.

=== Southern ===
On 14 June 2017, Rehman announced via his Twitter page that he had signed with Southern, returning to Hong Kong for the first time since 2013. Rehman chose Southern ahead of several other offers from around the world, citing the lure of working with head coach Cheng Siu Chung as the main attraction.

On 28 April 2020, Southern announced an agreement with Rehman to extend his contract.

== Coaching career ==
=== Southern ===
On 16 May 2020, towards the end of the 2019-20 season when COVID started Rehman was named as a player-manager for Southern, achieving his first coaching role since obtaining his UEFA Pro License. He spent two seasons prior to this operating as a development coach working closely with the club's emerging youth prospects that won the U18 League and FA Youth Cup.

On 30 May 2021, Rehman completed his first full season as player head coach leading Southern to a 5th place mid-table finish, a remarkable achievement in the duo role while operating on the lowest budget in the league, working with the youngest coaching team and himself being the youngest head coach in the Hong Kong Premier League.

In January 2022, at the halfway point of the new season, Rehman guided Southern to the top of the league with the second-highest number of goals scored, the best defensive record in the league, and the most clean sheets beating Asian Champions league side Kitchee and last years league runners up Eastern along the way. Southern was also in the top three of the Sapling Cup League.

In May 2022 Rehman announced his retirement, and called time on a 21 year playing career which spanned two decades across several countries. He described his time as an amazing experience both on and off the pitch.

=== Portsmouth ===
Having finished his playing career, in June 2022 Rehman took a role with Portsmouth FC as U18 Coach.

In January 2023, after the dismissal of Danny Cowley and Nicky Cowley as head coach and assistant head coach, Rehman became interim first team assistant manager.

Rehman remained in the interim assistant head coach role after the appointment of John Mousinho as the new head coach.

The pairs first game in charge resulted in a 2-0 home win against visitors Exeter City on Saturday 21 January 2023, their first EFL League One home win since 3 September 2022. Three days later on 24 January 2023, Portsmouth travelled to Fleetwood Town and defeated them 0-2, their first EFL League One away win since 22 October 2022.

On 23 March 2023 Rehman was announced as the First Team Development Coach. During the season, Rehman became the first British Pakistani former player to be working as a coach within a first-team set-up across the English professional leagues.

On 22 December 2025, Rehman departed the club to take up a new position in Saudi Arabia.

== International career ==
Rehman originally represented England, and played for them at under-18, under-19 and under-20 levels. Becoming the first English-born Pakistani to don an England senior football shirt seemed too far away, however, due to lack of first team opportunities at Fulham. Due to his Pakistani parentage, and because he possessed dual Pakistani and British nationality, Rehman also qualified to represent Pakistan, and he eventually opted to play for them, as he considered it to be a more realistic option. A lot of British Asian groups were against this and wanted him to fight more for an England place to set a standard for English-Asian youth.

It was, however, an unrealistic aspiration. With that in mind, and with the blessings of his father, Rehman was approached by Malik Riaz Hai Naveed, a young football manager and made his international debut for Pakistan in a 1–0 win over Sri Lanka in the 2005 South Asian Football Federation Championship on 7 December 2005 at the Peoples Football Stadium in Karachi. Pakistan ultimately reached the semi-finals before losing out to Bangladesh 1–0.

"The reception I received from the first moment till the last was unforgettable. I felt loved, appreciated, respected and wanted and most of all the interest in football really grew immensely."

— —Rehman, on his international debut with Pakistan.

Rehman was named in the Pakistan squad for the 2010 World Cup qualifying matches against Iraq in October 2007, and played the match in Lahore but could not help contain Asian champions Iraq from winning 7–0. In the second leg on 28 October he captained Pakistan to a 0–0 draw. However, he also had to withdraw from the squad for the 2008 SAFF Championship when he came down with food poisoning. After nearly four years out, Rehman returned to the Pakistan team for the 2012 AFC Challenge Cup qualifiers.

=== 2013–19 ===
In September 2013 Rehman represented Pakistan at the SAFF Championship which was held in Nepal. He played all of the games for Pakistan who narrowly missed out on a semi-final spot despite beating Bangladesh in the last group game. His commanding displays during the tournament earned him a place in the Team of the Tournament. In October 2013, Rehman captained Pakistan in both of their games at The Peace Cup held in the Philippines, and scored the winning goal in the opener against Chinese Taipei.

In September 2018 played in his final SAFF Tournament for Pakistan in Bangladesh since his first game in the competition some 13 years earlier. He played all of the games helping the team progress to the semi-final stage of the competition against rivals India.

In June 2019 Zesh Captained the team for the 2022 Asian World Cup Qualifiers against Cambodia over two legs. Pakistan fell short of a place in the group stage of the competition with consecutive defeats in Phnom Penh and in Doha, this was his final game in an international shirt.

=== Controversy ===
"Why wasn't (Chopra) picked ahead of Dave Nugent? He's the top goal scorer in the Championship but he can't get in (the England set-up). So he needs to maybe look at his decision and go play for India instead of hanging on to the dream of playing for England, because it's not going to happen, end of discussion."

— Rehman on an interview with Eastern Eye.

Rehman caused controversy in 2007 when in an interview with the British weekly newspaper the Eastern Eye he said that players of Asian descent should consider sticking to their roots rather than dreaming of playing for England. Rehman pointed to Michael Chopra and David Nugent, who both were top scorers in the Championship, but Nugent was called up for England while Chopra was not.

== Personal life ==
Rehman has said that, his "sole purpose in trying to be a success as a professional footballer is to inspire other Asian players to follow my lead and achieve their goals." He is an ambassador for the Asian Football Network (AFN), a grassroots community-led initiative designed to support and facilitate the development of grassroots Asian football in the UK. He has also worked with the Professional Footballers' Association (PFA) to try to increase the number of British Asians taking up a career in professional football, and has attended meetings with the PFA in order to achieve this goal. He has also been involved in the Show Racism the Red Card campaign and he has taken part in Chelsea's "Search for an Asian Star" campaign. On 12 July 2008, he took part in the Islam Expo event at the Olympia exhibition centre in West Kensington, London, a four-day event whose primary purpose was to build bridges between Britain's Muslim communities and the rest of society. Rehman took part in a panel giving feedback from his own experiences about the positive use of sport.

In April 2008, Rehman appeared on the United States-based Afghan satellite television network Noor TV and Bangladesh-based Islamic TV discussing being a Muslim footballer and how it is possible to pursue a career in football while sticking to Islamic roots. On 20 April 2008, he was a guest on the BBC Asian Network radio station show Breakdown revealing his favourite Desi music tunes. In May 2008, Rehman was awarded the Community Commitment Award at QPR. In April 2008, Rehman took part in a radio documentary on BBC Radio 1Xtra about British Asians in football which followed his "journey from playground to Premier League".

In May 2010, he launched The Zesh Rehman Foundation at Valley Parade to encourage children from all backgrounds to participate in football and sport to better themselves. He was named as one of the 50 World Cup Bid Ambassadors for The FA's World Cup 2018 bid, entered the Show Racism Red Card Hall of Fame, and was invited onto the PFA management committee by Gordon Taylor.

In 2014, he was named as on the special South East Asia contributor for the ESPN South East Asia section by writing blogs and columns about football in the rapidly growing football region of Asia. Rehman wrote his second blog for the ESPN South East Asia section a few days after his side recorded victory in the Malaysia Cup quarter-finals.

== Career statistics ==
=== Club ===
Appearances and goals by club, season and competition
Club	Season	League			National cup		League cup		Continental		Other		Total	
Club	Season	Division	Apps	Goals	Apps	Goals	Apps	Goals	Apps	Goals	Apps	Goals	Apps	Goals
Fulham	2003–04	Premier League	1	0	0	0	1	0	—		—		2	0
Fulham	2004–05	Premier League	17	0	2	0	4	0	—		—		23	0
Fulham	2005–06	Premier League	3	0	0	0	2	1	—		—		5	1
Fulham	Total		21	0	2	0	7	1	—		—		30	1
Brighton & Hove Albion (loan)	2003–04	Second Division	11	2	0	0	0	0	—		2 (Note: Appearances in Football League Trophy)	0	13	2
Norwich City (loan)	2005–06	Championship	5	0	0	0	0	0	—		—		5	0
Queens Park Rangers	2006–07	Championship	25	0	1	0	1	0	—		—		27	0
Queens Park Rangers	2007–08	Championship	21	0	0	0	1	0	—		—		22	0
Queens Park Rangers	Total		46	0	1	0	2	0	—		—		49	2
Brighton & Hove Albion (loan)	2006–07	League One	15	0	0	0	0	0	—		—		15	0
Blackpool (loan)	2008–09	Championship	3	0	0	0	1	0	—		—		4	0
Bradford City (loan)	2008–09	League Two	17	0	0	0	0	0	—		0	0	17	0
Bradford City	2009–10	League Two	38	2	1	0	1	0	—		2	0	42	2
Bradford City	2010–11	League Two	8	0	1	0	2	0	—		1	0	12	0
Bradford City	Total		63	2	2	0	3	0	—		3	0	71	2
Muangthong United	2011	Thai Premier League	30	1	0	0	0	0	5 (Note: Appearances in AFC Cup and AFC Champions League)	0	—		35	1
Kitchee	2011–12	Hong Kong First Division	9	0	4	1	3	0	7 (Note: Appearances in AFC Cup)	1	—		23	2
Kitchee	2012–13	Hong Kong First Division	15	0	4	0	0	0	9	0	2 (Note: Appearances in Hong Kong Senior Shield)	0	30	0
Kitchee	2013–14	Hong Kong First Division	6	0	4	0	0	0	0	0	1	0	11	0
Kitchee	Total		30	0	12	1	3	0	16	1	3	0	41	0
Pahang FA	2014	Malaysia Super League	21	1	10	3	7	1	0	0	0	0	38	5
Pahang FA	2015	Malaysia Super League	21	6	10	1	6	1	8	0	0	0	45	8
Pahang FA	2016	Malaysia Super League	11	0	0	0	1	0	0	0	0	0	12	0
Pahang FA	Total		53	7	20	4	14	2	8	0	0	0	95	13
Gillingham	2016–17	League One	10	0	0	0	0	0	0	0	0	0	10	0
Southern	2017–22	Hong Kong Premier League	67	0	20	0	12	0	1	0	0	0	100	2
Career total			354	14	57	5	42	3	30	1	8	0	491	23

=== International ===
Appearances and goals by national team and year
National team	Year	Apps	Goals
Pakistan	2005	4	0
Pakistan	2007	2	0
Pakistan	2011	3	0
Pakistan	2012	1	0
Pakistan	2013	5	1
Pakistan	2018	5	0
Pakistan	2019	2	0
Total		22	1

Scores and results list Pakistan's goal tally first, score column indicates score after each Rehman goal.

List of international goals scored by Zesh Rehman
No.	Date	Venue	Opponent	Score	Result	Competition
1	13 October 2013	Panaad Stadium, Bacolod, Philippines	Chinese Taipei	1–0	1–0	2013 Philippine Peace Cup

== See also ==
- British Asians in association football
- List of Pakistan international footballers born outside Pakistan
- List of Pakistan national football team captains
