= Azidan Sarudin =

Malaysian footballer

Personal information
- Full name: Azidan bin Sarudin
- Date of birth: 31 May 1986 (age 40)
- Place of birth: Kuala Lumpur, Malaysia
- Height: 1.72 m (5 ft 7 1/2 in)
- Position: Midfielder

Team information
- Current team: Carabat F.C.
- Number: 8

Youth career
- 2004–2006: Kuala Lumpur U-21

Senior career*
Years	Team	Apps	(Gls)
2006–2010	Kuala Lumpur FA		
2011–2012	Selangor FA		
2013–2015	Pahang FA		
2016	Kuala Lumpur FA		
2016	AirAsia FC		
2017	Kuala Lumpur FA		
2017–2018	Penang FA	9	(0)
2019–2022	Harini F.C.		
2024–2025	Carabat F.C.		
- * Club domestic league appearances and goals as of 13 May 2018 ‡ National team caps and goals as of January 23, 2016

Azidan Sarudin (born 31 May 1986 in Kuala Lumpur) is a Malaysian footballer who plays for Carabat F.C. in the Malaysia A3 Community League as a central midfielder.

== Honours ==
=== Club ===
Sarudin won two Malaysia Cups in the 2013 and 2014 Malaysia Cup. In 2014, he won an Malaysia FA Cup during the year's season. He was also awarded the Sultan Haji Ahmad Shah Cup during the 2014 edition.
