= 2014 Pahang FA season =

Pahang
2014 season
- President: Tengku Abdul Rahman Ibni Sultan Haji Ahmad Shah
- Head Coach: Zainal Abidin Hassan
- Stadium: Darul Makmur Stadium; Kuantan (Capacity: 40,000)
- Liga Super: 3rd
- Piala FA: Winners
- Piala Malaysia: Winners
- Piala Sumbangsih: Winners
- Top goalscorer: League: Matías Conti (9); All: Matías Conti (17)
Home colours	Away colours	Third colours

The 2014 season was Pahang FA's 11th season in the Liga Super.

== Competitions ==
=== Liga Super ===
==== League table ====
Pos	Team	Pld	W	D	L	GF	GA	GD	Pts	Qualification or relegation
1	Johor Darul Ta'zim	22	13	5	4	39	22	+17	44	2015 AFC Champions League qualifying play-off
2	Selangor	22	12	5	5	28	19	+9	41	
3	Pahang	22	11	4	7	36	30	+6	37	2015 AFC Cup group stage (Note: Qualified as 2014 Piala FA winners)
4	Terengganu	22	10	6	6	38	28	+10	36	
5	Sime Darby	22	9	4	9	32	32	0	31	

Source: RSSSF, FAM Official Site, Astro Arena
Rules for classification: 1) points; 2) goal difference; 3) number of goals scored
