= 2014 Malaysia FA Cup =

Piala FA

Tournament details
- Country: Malaysia; Singapore
- Teams: 30

Final positions
- Champions: Pahang FA (2nd title)
- Runners-up: FELDA United F.C.

Tournament statistics
- Matches played: 48
- Top goal scorer: Patrick Wleh (4 goals) (PKNS FC)

Awards
- Best player: Mohd Faizol Hussien (Pahang FA)

The 2014 Malaysia FA Cup, also known as the Astro Piala FA due to the competition's sponsorship by Astro Arena, was the 25th season of the Malaysia FA Cup, a knockout competition for Malaysia's state football association and clubs.

Kelantan were the defending champions. Pahang FA lift the cup at Shah Alam Stadium on 7 June 2014 after defeating Felda United F.C. 2–1.

Pahang FA has qualified for the 2015 AFC Cup as the competition winner.

== Teams ==
* ATM	* Cebagoo
* Felda United	* Johor Darul Takzim II
* Johor Darul Takzim (2013 Piala FA runners up)	* Kedah
* Kuala Lumpur	* Kelantan (2013 Piala FA champion)
* LionsXII (From Singapore)	* Malacca United
* Negeri Sembilan	* Pahang
* PBAPP	* Penang
* Perak	* Perlis
* PDRM	* PKNS
* DRB-Hicom	* Kuantan
* Sabah	* Sarawak
* Selangor	* Shahzan Muda
* Sime Darby	* Putrajaya SPA
* Harimau Muda C	* Terengganu
* T–Team	* UiTM

== Format ==
30 teams will participate in this tournament instead of 32 in the 2013 edition. 2013 winners Kelantan and runners-up Johor Darul Takzim have received byes for this edition and will progress straight into the Round of 16.

Just like the previous edition, the first two rounds would be single matches. The quarter finals and semi finals would be played over two legs while the final will be played at Shah Alam Stadium, Shah Alam between Pahang FA and Felda United, on 7 June.

== Matches ==
The draw for the Piala FA 2014 was held at Blue Wave Hotel, Shah Alam on 29 November 2013.

=== Bracket ===
First round
(Terengganu) T–Team	3
(Selangor) UiTM	2
Kuala Lumpur	0
Kedah	4
Malacca United	1
Perlis	2
(Penang) PBAPP	2
(Sabah) Cebagoo	0
(Malaysia) PDRM	1
(Kuala Lumpur) Putrajaya SPA	0
LionsXII	3
(Kuala Lumpur) DRB-Hicom	0
Perak	2(4)
Pahang(p)	2(5)
(Pahang) Kuantan	0
Sabah	1
(Selangor) PKNS	3
Johor Darul Takzim II	2
Terengganu	4
(Pahang) Shahzan Muda	0
(Kuala Lumpur) Sime Darby	2
(Malaysia) ATM	1
Negeri Sembilan	0
(Kuala Lumpur) FELDA United	1
(Malaysia) Harimau Muda C	0
Selangor	2
Sarawak(aet)	2
Penang	1

Second round
Johor Darul Takzim	3
(Terengganu) T–Team	0
Kedah	4
Perlis	0
(Penang) PBAPP	0
(Malaysia) PDRM	2
(Singapore) LionsXII	1
Pahang	2
Kelantan	2
Sabah	1
(Selangor) PKNS	2
Terengganu	1
(Kuala Lumpur) Sime Darby	0
(Kuala Lumpur) FELDA United	1
Selangor	0
Sarawak	1

Quarter-finals
Johor Darul Takzim	3	2	5
Kedah	1	0	1
(Malaysia) PDRM FA	1	1	2
Pahang	1	2	3
Kelantan	3	3	6
(Selangor) PKNS	2	3	5
(Kuala Lumpur) FELDA United	0	2	2 a.g.r.
Sarawak	0	2	2

Semi-finals
Johor Darul Takzim	1	0	1
Pahang	1	1	2
Kelantan	3	2	5
(Kuala Lumpur) FELDA United	3	2	5 a.g.r.

Final
Pahang	2
(Kuala Lumpur) FELDA United	1

=== First round ===
The first round will commence on 21 & 22 January 2014.

Tuesday 21 January	UiTM (Selangor)	2 – 3	(Terengganu) T-Team	UiTM Stadium, Shah Alam, Selangor
16:15 UTC+08:00	Adam Othman 49'; Obi 66'		Evaldo Gonçalves 3', 13'; Fabio Flor 30'	Referee: Kamal Ahmad (Kuala Lumpur)

Tuesday 21 January	Melaka United (Malacca)	1 – 2	Perlis	Hang Jebat Stadium, Malacca
16:15 UTC+08:00	Rashid Mahmud 41'		Farizal Rozali 34' 50'	Referee: Ahmad Zuhaidi Dzulkifli

Tuesday 21 January	PDRM (Malaysia)	1 – 0	Putrajaya SPA	MBPJ Stadium, Petaling Jaya, Selangor
16:15 UTC+08:00	Ali Ashfaq 73'			Referee: Ramli Mat Dahan

Tuesday 21 January	LionsXII (Singapore)	3 – 0	(Kuala Lumpur) DRB-Hicom	Bishan Stadium, Bishan, Singapore
19:45 UTC+08:00	Sufian Anuar 27'; Gabriel Quak 53'; Faris Ramli 90+3'			Referee: P Jeevanathan

Tuesday 21 January	Kuala Lumpur	0 – 4	Kedah	Darul Aman Stadium, Alor Star, Kedah
20:45 UTC+08:00			Khairul Helmi Johari 58'; Mohd Khyril Muhymeen Zambri 66'; Adam Griffiths 68' 77'	Referee: Azham Musa

Tuesday 21 January	PBAPP (Penang)	2 – 0	(Sabah) Cebagoo	Bandaraya Stadium, George Town, Penang
20:45 UTC+08:00	K. Ravindran 64'; Mohd Faiz Mohd Nasir 81'			Referee: Zulkifli Ahmad

Tuesday 21 January	Perak	2 – 2 (a.e.t.) (4 – 5 p)	Pahang	Perak Stadium, Ipoh, Perak
20:45 UTC+08:00	Hardi Jaafar 12'; Zayar Win 45'		Azamuddin Akil 8'; Damion Stewart 57'	Referee: Mohd Yusof Mat Karim (Tentera)
	Penalties
	Terkeš (penalty scored); Hazrul (penalty missed); Azmeer (penalty missed); Eliel (penalty scored); Zayar Win (penalty scored); Hisyamudin (penalty scored); Syahmil (penalty missed)		Conti (penalty scored); Faizol (penalty missed); Razman (penalty scored); Zesh (penalty scored); Azamuddin (penalty missed); Fauzi (penalty scored); Saiful (penalty scored)

Tuesday 21 January	Kuantan (Pahang)	0 – 1	Sabah	Darul Makmur Stadium, Kuantan, Pahang
20:45 UTC+08:00			Marwan Sayedeh 18'	Referee: Suresh Jayaraman

Tuesday 21 January	PKNS (Selangor)	3 – 2	Johor Darul Takzim II	Naval Base Stadium, Lumut, Perak
20:45 UTC+08:00	Hamka Hamzah; Patrick Wleh		Braulio Nóbrega; Hairul Nizam Hanif	Referee: Samsudin Ibrahim (Terengganu)

Tuesday 21 January	Terengganu	4 – 0	(Pahang) Shahzan Muda	Sultan Ismail Nasiruddin Shah Stadium, Kuala Terengganu, Terengganu
20:45 UTC+08:00	Márcio Souza 11' 41'; Manaf Mamat 36'; Zairo 76'			Referee: Mohd Nafeez Abd Wahab (Johor)

Tuesday 21 January	Sime Darby (Kuala Lumpur)	2 – 1	ATM	Majlis Perbandaran Selayang Stadium, Selayang, Selangor
20:45 UTC+08:00	Mahmoud Amnah 15' 85'		Rezal Zambery 66'	Referee: Suhaimi Mat Hassan (Terengganu)

Tuesday 21 January	Negeri Sembilan	0 – 1	(Kuala Lumpur) Felda United	Tuanku Abdul Rahman Stadium, Paroi, Negeri Sembilan
20:45 UTC+08:00			Shukor Adan 72'	Referee: Mohd Fairurazi Mat Desa (Perak)

Tuesday 21 January	Sarawak	2 – 1 (a.e.t.)	Penang	Sarawak Stadium, Kuching, Sarawak
20:45 UTC+08:00	Alireza Abbasfard 77'; Gábor Gyepes 99'		Baser Napae 90+1'	Referee: Zohri Tajudin (Melaka)

Wednesday 22 January	Harimau Muda C (Malaysia)	0 – 2	Selangor	MBPJ Stadium, Petaling Jaya, Selangor
16:15 UTC+08:00			Paulo Rangel 53'; Juninho 99'	Referee: Sukri Abd Rahman (Terengganu)

=== Second round ===
The second round will commence on 4 February 2014.

Saturday 1 February	LionsXII (Singapore)	1 – 2	Pahang	Jalan Besar Stadium, Kallang, Singapore
19:45 UTC+08:00	Safuwan Baharudin 86'		Mohd Hafiz Kamal 50'; Azidan Sarudin 54'	Referee: Syed Azhar Syed Kamar (Kuala Lumpur)

Saturday 1 February	Johor Darul Takzim	3 – 0 ^{1}	(Terengganu) T-Team	Tan Sri Dato Haji Hassan Yunos Stadium, Johor Bahru, Johor
20:45 UTC+08:00				Referee: Les Mostia Mohen Mohd Tisan (Negeri Sembilan)

Tuesday 4 February	Kedah	4 – 0	Perlis	Darul Aman Stadium, Alor Star, Kedah
20:45 UTC+08:00	Billy Mehmet 44'; Adam Griffiths 53'; Baddrol Bakhtiar 63'; Khairul Helmi Johari 90'			Referee: Jeffferi Zolkifli (Perak)

Tuesday 4 February	PBAPP (Penang)	0 – 2	(Malaysia) PDRM	Bandaraya Stadium, George Town, Penang
20:45 UTC+08:00			Charles Souza Chad 66'; Bobby Gonzales 69'	Referee: Zulkifli Ahmad

Tuesday 4 February	Kelantan	2 – 1	Sabah	Sultan Mohammad IV Stadium, Kota Bharu, Kelantan
20:45 UTC+08:00	Mohamed Shawky 44'; Shakir Ali 86'		Rosdin Wasli 50'	Referee: Sukri Abd. Rahman (Terengganu)

Tuesday 4 February	PKNS (Selangor)	2 – 1	Terengganu	Paroi Stadium, Seremban, Negeri Sembilan
16:15 UTC+08:00	Patrick Wleh 36'; Karlo Primorac 80'		Ismail Faruqi Asha'ri 49'	Referee: Azman Jamaludin

Tuesday 4 February	Sime Darby (Kuala Lumpur)	0 – 1	(Kuala Lumpur) Felda United	Majlis Perbandaran Selayang Stadium, Selayang, Selangor
20:45 UTC+08:00			Zah Rahan Krangar 83'	Referee: Wan Mohd. Tarmizi Wan Ibrahim (Selangor)

Tuesday 4 February	Selangor	0 – 1	Sarawak	MBPJ Stadium, Petaling Jaya, Selangor
20:45 UTC+08:00			Zamri Morshidi 33'	Referee: Mohd. Fairurazi Mat Desa (Perak)

^{1} Johor were awarded a 3–0 victory due to T-Team walking off at half time with the result at 2–1 to Johor.

=== Quarter-finals ===
==== First leg ====
Tuesday 11 February	Johor Darul Takzim	3 – 1	Kedah	Tan Sri Dato Hj Hassan Yunos Stadium, Johor Bahru, Johor
20:45 UTC+08:00	Mohd Amri Yahyah 15'; Hariss Harun 22'; Luciano Figueroa 90+2'		Billy Mehmet 24'	Referee: Syed Azhar Syed Kamar (Kuala Lumpur)

Tuesday 11 February	PDRM (Malaysia)	1 – 1	Pahang	Paroi Stadium, PSeremban, Negeri Sembilan
20:45 UTC+08:00	Charles Souza Chad 14'		Matías Conti 78'	Referee: Suhaizi Shukri (Melaka)

Tuesday 11 February	Kelantan	3 – 2	(Selangor) PKNS	Sultan Muhammad IV Stadium, Kota Bharu, Kelantan
20:45 UTC+08:00	Mohd Badhri Mohd Radzi 3'; Tengku Hasbullah Raja Hassan 42'; Ahmad Shakir Mohd Ali 75'		Patrick Wleh 20'; Kim Dong-Chan 83'	Referee: Zohri Tajudin (Melaka)

Tuesday 11 February	FELDA United (Kuala Lumpur)	0 – 0	Sarawak	Selayang Stadium, Selayang, Selangor
20:45 UTC+08:00				Referee: Les Mostia Tisan (Negeri Sembilan)

==== Second leg ====
Tuesday 18 February	Kedah	0 – 2	Johor Darul Takzim	Darul Aman Stadium, Alor Setar, Kedah
20:45 UTC+08:00		Agg 5-1 (JDT F.C. win)	Norshahrul Idlan Talaha 62'; Safee Sali 85'	Referee: Nagoor Amir Noor Mohamed (Kuala Lumpur)

Tuesday 18 February	Pahang	2 – 1	(Malaysia) PDRM	Darul Makmur Stadium, Kuantan, Pahang
20:45 UTC+08:00	Mohd Fauzi Roslan 40'; Mohd Hafiz Kamal 90+1'	Agg 3-2 (Pahang FA win)	Charles Souza Chad 50'	Referee: Wan Mohd Tarmizi Wan Ibrahim (Selangor)

Tuesday 18 February	PKNS (Selangor)	3 – 3	Kelantan	Selayang Stadium, Selayang, Selangor
20:45 UTC+08:00	Patrick Wleh 2'; Karlo Primorac 44(pen)' Hamka Hamzah 70'	Agg 6-5 (Kelantan FA win)	Ahmad Fakri Saarani 10'; Ahmad Shakir Mohd Ali 25'; Mohammed Ghaddar 72'	Referee: Nafeez Abdul Wahab (Johor)

Tuesday 18 February	Sarawak	2 – 2	(Kuala Lumpur) FELDA United	Sarawak State Stadium, Kuching, Sarawak
20:45 UTC+08:00	Joseph Kalang Tie 17'; Akmal Rizal Ahmad Rakhli 80'	Agg 2-2 (Felda United win due to away game goal rule)	Zah Rahan Krangar 37'; Indra Putra Mahayuddin 83'	Referee: Zamzaidi Katimin (Melaka)

=== Semi-finals ===
==== First leg ====
Monday 5 May	Johor Darul Takzim F.C.	1 – 1	Pahang FA	Tan Sri Dato Hj Hassan Yunos Stadium, Johor Bahru, Johor
20:45 UTC+08:00	Luciano Figueroa 13'		Matías Conti 37'

Tuesday 6 May	Kelantan FA	3 – 3	(Kuala Lumpur) Felda United	Sultan Muhammad IV Stadium, Kota Bharu, Kelantan
20:45 UTC+08:00	Forkey Doe 41'; Fakri Saarani 43'; Wan Zaharulnizam Zakaria 51'		Edward Wilson 17'; Indraputra Mahayuddin 25'; Mohd Khairul Ismail 36'

==== Second leg ====
Friday 30 May	Pahang FA	1 – 0	Johor Darul Takzim F.C.	Darul Makmur Stadium, Kuantan, Pahang
20:45 UTC+08:00	Mohd Faizol Hussien 81'	(Agg: 2–1)		Attendance: 35,000

Saturday 31 May	Felda United (Kuala Lumpur)	2 – 2	Kelantan FA	Shah Alam Stadium, Shah Alam, Selangor
20:45 UTC+08:00	Indra Putra Mahayuddin 20'; Edward Junior Wilson 45+3'	(Agg:5-5) Felda win due to away goal rules	Izuan Rosli 29'; Forkey Doe 34'

== Final ==
The final was held at Shah Alam Stadium on 7 June 2014.

7 June 2014	Pahang FA	2 – 1	(Kuala Lumpur) Felda United	Shah Alam Stadium, Shah Alam, Selangor
20:45 UTC+08:00	Mohd Faizol Hussien 80'; Dickson Nwakaeme 89'		Edward Junior Wilson 24'	Attendance: 60,000

== Season statistics ==
=== Top scorers ===
Rank	Player	Club	Goals
1	(Australia) Adam Griffiths	Kedah FA	3
2	(Malaysia) Khairul Helmi Johari	Kedah	2
2	(Brazil) Márcio Souza Da Silva	Terengganu FA	2
2	(Brazil) Evaldo Gonçalves	(Terengganu) T-Team F.C.	2
2	(Liberia) Patrick Wleh	(Selangor) PKNS F.C.	2
2	(Malaysia) Mohd Farizal Rozali	Perlis FA	2
2	(Syria) Mahmoud Amnah	(Kuala Lumpur) Sime Darby F.C.	2

As of 5 February 2014

== See also ==
- 2014 Malaysia Super League
- 2014 Malaysia Premier League
- 2014 Malaysia FAM League
- 2014 Malaysia Cup
