= Evaldo Gonçalves =

Brazilian politician (1933–2025)

Member of the Chamber of Deputies of Brazil for Paraíba
- In office 1 February 1987 – 31 January 1995

Member of the Brazilian Constituent Assembly
- In office 1 February 1987 – 22 July 1988

Personal details
- Born: Evaldo Gonçalves de Queiroz; 15 June 1933 São João do Cariri, Paraíba, Brazil
- Died: 18 January 2025 (aged 91) João Pessoa, Paraíba, Brazil
- Party: PDS; PFL
- Education: Federal University of Paraíba; Federal University of Pernambuco
- Occupation: Lawyer

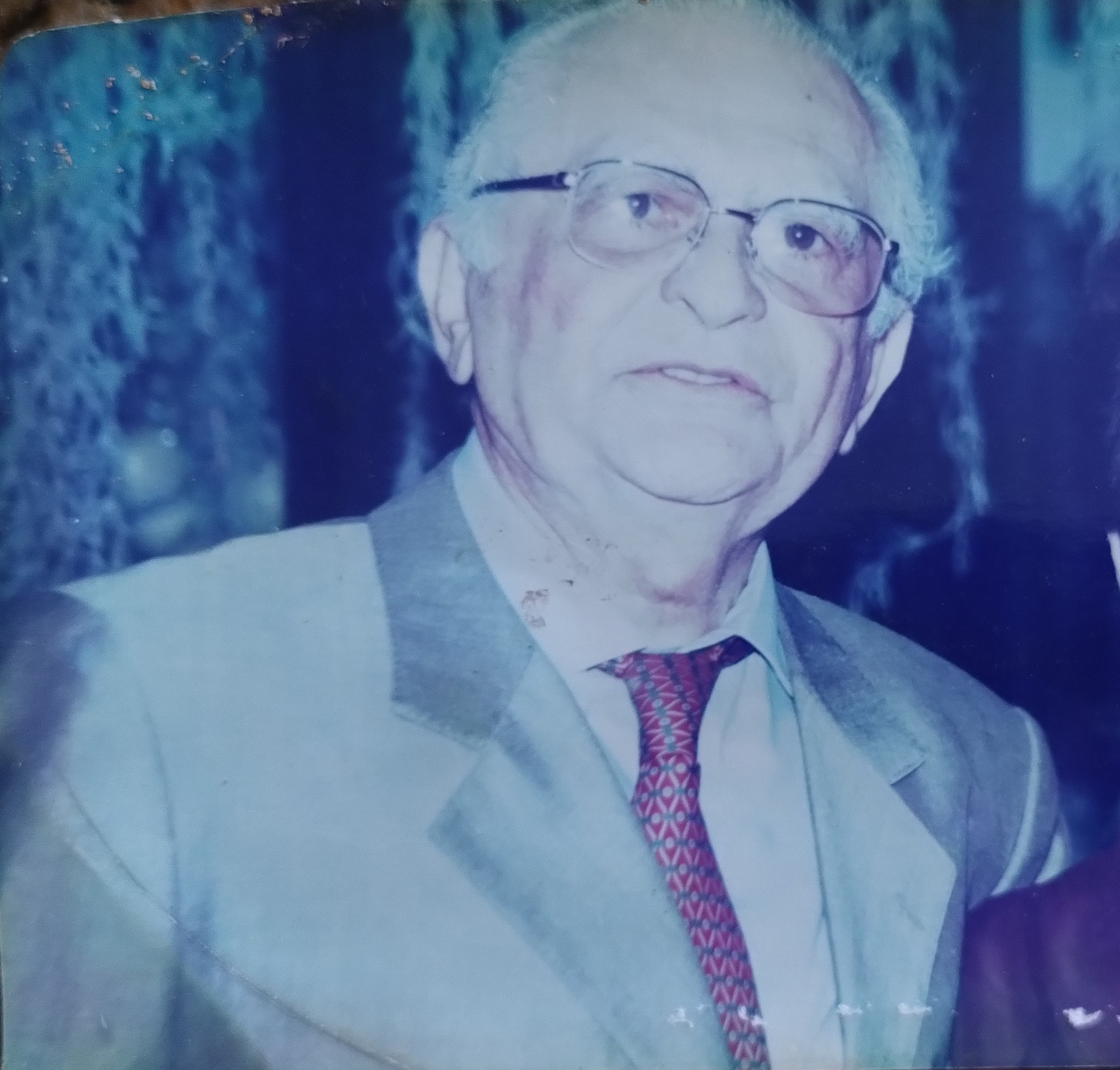
Evaldo Gonçalves de Queiroz

Evaldo Gonçalves de Queiroz (15 June 1933 – 18 January 2025) was a Brazilian politician. A member of the Democratic Social Party and the Liberal Front Party, he served in the Chamber of Deputies from 1987 to 1995 and was a member of the Constituent Assembly from 1987 to 1988.

Gonçalves died in João Pessoa on 18 January 2025, at the age of 91.
