= Hairul Nizam Hanif =

Malaysian footballer

Personal information
- Full name: Hairul Nizam Hanif
- Date of birth: April 6, 1979 (age 47)
- Place of birth: Pahang, Malaysia
- Height: 1.78 m (5 ft 10 in)
- Positions: Defender; midfielder

Senior career*
Years	Team	Apps	(Gls)
2000–2004	Pahang FA	26	(0)
2005–2007	Melaka Telekom FC	35	(3)
2008–2010	KL PLUS FC	29	(2)
2011	PKNS FC	20	(2)
2012	Sime Darby FC	19	(1)
2013	JDT II FC	36	(1)

International career^{‡}
2001	Malaysia	2	(0)
- * Club domestic league appearances and goals as of August 07, 2014 ‡ National team caps and goals as of August 07, 2014

Hairul Nizam Hanif (born April 6, 1979) is a retired Malaysian footballer
