= Es Lizuan Zahid Amir =

Malaysian professional football player

Es Lizuan Zahid
Personal information
- Full name: Es Lizuan Zahid Amir
- Date of birth: 5 November 1983 (age 42)
- Place of birth: Setiawan, Perak, Malaysia
- Height: 1.78 m (5 ft 10 in)
- Positions: Left back; defender

Team information
- Current team: Immigration F.C. (match analyst)

Youth career
- 2002–2003: Perak President's Cup Team

Senior career*
| Years | Team | Apps | (Gls) |
| 2004–2005 | Perlis FA | 17 | (0) |
| 2005–2006 | Sabah FA | 21 | (0) |
| 2006–2007 | Melaka TMFC | 23 | (0) |
| 2007–2009 | Perlis FA | 19 | (1) |
| 2010–2010 | PLUS FC | 20 | (2) |
| 2011–2012 | Sime Darby FC | 26 | (1) |
| 2013–2014 | PKNS FC | 27 | (0) |
- * Club domestic league appearances and goals ‡ National team caps and goals as of 3 July 2014

Es Lizuan Zahid Amir (born 5 November 1983, in Kangar, Perlis) is a Malaysian former professional football player.
