= São João do Cariri =

Coordinates: 7°23′S 36°31′W

- Municipality
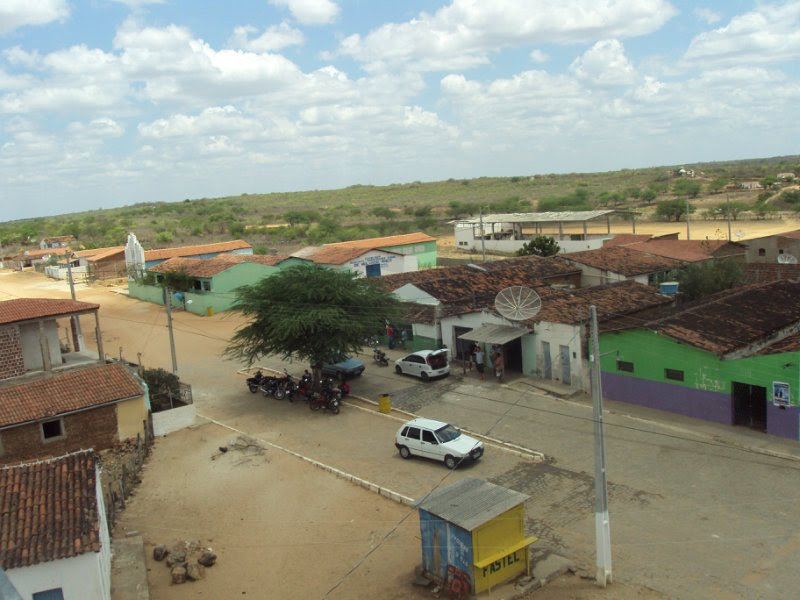

- Flag Coat of arms
- Interactive map of São João do Cariri
- Country: Brazil
- Region: Northeast
- State: Paraíba
- Mesoregion: Boborema

Population (2020)
  - Total: 4,184
- Time zone: UTC−3 (BRT)
- Area code: +55 83

São João do Cariri (Central northeastern portuguese pronunciation: [ˈsɐ̃w ˈʒ͡wɐ̃w du kɐɾiˈɾi]) is a municipality in the state of Paraíba in the Northeast Region of Brazil.

== See also ==
- List of municipalities in Paraíba
