= Matías Conti =

Argentine professional footballer

Personal information
- Full name: Matías Ruben Conti
- Date of birth: 17 January 1990 (age 36)
- Place of birth: Reconquista, Argentina
- Height: 1.85 m (6 ft 1 in)
- Position: Striker

Youth career
- 2005–2008: Vélez Sarsfield

Senior career*
Years	Team	Apps	(Gls)
2009–2010	Vélez Sarsfield	4	(0)
2010–2011	→ Deportivo Merlo (loan)	12	(1)
2011–2012	Deportivo Merlo	15	(1)
2012–2013	Tristán Suárez	20	(1)
2013–2015	Pahang	66	(24)
2015–2017	Universidad de Concepción	18	(2)
2017–2018	Estudiantes	14	(3)
2018–2019	Borneo Samarinda	40	(22)
2020	Al-Ramtha	0	(0)
2021–2022	Deportivo Armenio	8	(1)
2021	→ Fénix de Pilar (loan)	9	(2)
Total		206	(57)
- * Club domestic league appearances and goals

Matías Ruben Conti (born 17 January 1990) is an Argentine former professional footballer who plays as a striker.

He was born on January 17, 1990. Son of Alice and Ruben, with three siblings, he lives in same village to Gabriel Batistuta, who Conti refer him as his idol. Conti begins to chart a path that can lead to the first in a short time. Protagonist highlight of the fourth division in the first months of 2009 where he scored 10 goals, the striker Santa Fe began to be called up reserves and start of second season he was called up for his first preseason with the first team.

== Club career ==
=== Vélez Sarsfield ===
Conti began his club career in top Argentina Primera División, Vélez Sarsfield. In the 2009–10 season he made his professional debut in the Argentine Primera División on 14 December 2009, when Vélez Sarsfield vs Rosario Central. He played 4 match before he was loaned to Deportivo Merlo for 2010–2011. He scored 1 goal in 14 matches.

=== Deportivo Merlo ===
After an impressive season with Deportivo Merlo, Conti transferred to Deportivo Merlo for 2011–2012 season. He scored first goal for the club on 27 May 2012, against Gimnasia La Plata. After the 2011–2012 season finished, he joined Tristán Suárez.

=== Tristán Suárez ===
He made his debut on 6 August, appearing as a substitute in a 0–2 loss against San Telmo, and made his first start for the club in the game against Barracas Central On 9 September 2012, he scored his first goal for Tristán Suárez in the 33rd minute against Deportivo Laferrere. He made 20 appearances with Tristán Suárez before he agreed to join Pahang FA in Malaysia Super League.

=== Sri Pahang F.C. ===
On 8 April 2013, Conti had a trial with Malaysia Super League side Sri Pahang to fill foreign player quota after Pahang had already signed Jamaican player, Damion Stewart earlier on. He scored 5 goals in friendly match against Shahzan Muda FC. On his debut, he scored a brace that put Pahang into Malaysia FA Cup semi-finals. On 3 November 2013, Conti scored the winner against Kelantan in a narrow 1–0 win in the Malaysia Cup final, which was the clubs first Malaysia Cup in 21-years.

In December 2013, Matias Conti confirmed that he will stay at Pahang for another season, ending speculation of the Argentine accepting a contract with a Spanish club.

== Honours ==
Pahang

- Malaysia FA Cup: 2014
- Malaysia Cup: 2013, 2014
- Malaysia Charity Shield: 2014
