= Faizol Hussien =

Malaysian footballer

Personal information
- Full name: Mohd Faizol bin Hussien
- Date of birth: 12 May 1986 (age 40)
- Place of birth: Kluang, Johor, Malaysia
- Height: 1.74 m (5 ft 8 1/2 in)
- Position: Midfielder

Team information
- Current team: Hanelang
- Number: 11

Youth career
- Bukit Jalil Sports School

Senior career*
Years	Team	Apps	(Gls)
2008–2010	Johor	36	(6)
2010–2014	Pahang	92	(19)
2015–2016	Johor Darul Ta'zim FC II	1	(0)
2017	PDRM	0	(0)
2018–	Hanelang	3	(0)
- * Club domestic league appearances and goals as of 19 February 2018

Mohd Faizol bin Hussien (born May 12, 1986, in Johor) is a Malaysian footballer who plays for Hanelang in Malaysia FAM League as a central midfielder.

On 3 November 2013, he assisted Pahang to defeat Kelantan 1–0 in the Malaysia Cup final which ends Pahang's 21 years drought of the cup. In 2014, he also scored a goal in the FA Cup Semifinal and FA Cup final which helped Pahang win over Felda United.

== Honours ==
- Malaysia Cup: 2
  - Winners (2): 2013, 2014
- FA Cup: 1 Man of the match
  - Winners (1): 2014
