= 2014 Piala Sumbangsih =

Pahang	LionsXII
(Pahang)	(Singapore)
1	0
- Date: 17 January 2014
- Venue: Darul Makmur Stadium, Kuantan
- Man of the Match: Matías Conti (Pahang)
- Referee: Nagor Amir Noor Mohamed (Kuala Lumpur)
- Attendance: 40,000

The 2014 Piala Sumbangsih was the 29th edition of the Piala Sumbangsih, an annual football match played between the winners of the previous season's Malaysia Super League and Malaysia Cup. The game was played between Pahang, who beat Kelantan to win the 2013 Malaysia Cup Final, and LionsXII, champions of the 2013 Malaysia Super League. Watched by a crowd of 40,000 at Darul Makmur Stadium, Pahang won the match 1–0.

== Match details ==
17 January 2014
20:45 PDT

Pahang	1–0	LionsXII
Matías Conti 80'

Darul Makmur Stadium, Kuantan, Pahang
Attendance: 40,000
Referee: Nagor Amir Mohamad Nor

Pahang	Away

== Winners ==
2014 Piala Sumbangsih

Pahang
4th Title
