= Malaysia FA Cup =

- Organiser(s): Malaysia Football League (MFL)
- Founded: 1990; 36 years ago
- Region: Malaysia
- Qualifier for: AFC Champions League Two
- Current champions: Johor Darul Ta'zim (5th title)
- Most championships: Kedah; Selangor; Johor Darul Ta'zim (5 titles each)
- Broadcaster(s): Astro Arena; RTM
- Website: www.malaysianfootballleague.com
- 2026–27 Malaysia FA Cup

The Malaysia FA Cup (Malay: Piala FA) is an annual football competition in Malaysia, established in 1990. It was previously managed by the Football Association of Malaysia, before being transferred to the Malaysian Football League in the 2016 season.

The winners of the competition are awarded a slot in the AFC Champions League Two. The current title holders are Johor Darul Ta'zim, which won their fifth title in 2025.

== History ==
The tournament was introduced during the Liga Semi-Pro era in 1990. The first winner of the competition was Perak who beat Selangor 4–2 in the final at Merdeka Stadium, Kuala Lumpur.

In 2016, FMLLP has taken over the management of the competition from the Football Association of Malaysia (FAM). In the 2016 season, 32 teams competed in the tournament, 12 teams each from the Malaysia Super League and the Malaysia Premier League, with the remaining 8 spots decided by a play-off between the Malaysia FAM League teams.

== Logo evolution ==
Since the inception of the competition in 1990, numerous logo has been introduced for the cup to reflect the sponsorship purpose. Dunhill was the title sponsor for the competition until the agreement was ended at the end of the 2004 season as tobacco advertising was banned in the country. From 2005 to 2010, the Piala FA incorporated the TM brand as part of its logo as the title sponsor. After the end of TM sponsorship for seven consecutive years, FAM has been partnering with Astro Media as a strategic partner for the Malaysian League starting from the 2011 season.

In 2012, FAM introduced a new logo which has been used from 2012 until the end of the 2015 season. For the 2016 season a new logo was introduced as part of the takeover of the league by FMLLP. Superbest Power has become the title sponsor of the tournament for the 2016 season. For the 2017 season, FMLLP introduced a new logo without the title sponsor. In July 2018, FMLLP introduced a new logo with Shopee as the title sponsor for the 2018 season.

== Sponsorship ==
Period	Sponsor	Name
1990–2004	Dunhill	Dunhill FA Cup
2005–2010	TM	TM Fa Cup
2016	Superbest Power	Superbest Power FA Cup
2018–2019	Shopee	Shopee FA Cup

== Qualification for subsequent competitions ==
=== Asian football ===
The Malaysia FA Cup winners qualify for the following season's AFC Champions League Two. Previously, if the FA Cup winners also qualified for the following season's AFC Champions League or AFC Cup through their league or Asian performance, then the runner-up of the Malaysia Super League was given the Asian slot.

In 2020, the tournament was declared 'null and void' due to the COVID-19 pandemic and the Asian qualification berth for the AFC Champions League or AFC Cup was moved to the 2020 Malaysia Cup.

== Finals ==
Kedah supporters at the 2007 final

Year	Winners	Runners–up	Score	Venue
1990	Perak	Selangor	4–2	Merdeka Stadium
1991	Selangor	Perak	1–0	Merdeka Stadium
1992	Sarawak	Kuala Lumpur	2–1	Sarawak State Stadium
1993	Kuala Lumpur	Sabah	2–1	Merdeka Stadium
1994	Kuala Lumpur	Sabah	3–1	Merdeka Stadium
1995	Sabah	Pahang	3–1	Merdeka Stadium
1996	Kedah	Sarawak	1–0	Merdeka Stadium
1997	Selangor	Pulau Pinang	1–0	Perak Stadium
1998	Johor	Sabah	1–0	Likas Stadium
1999	Kuala Lumpur	Terengganu	0–0 (5–3 pen.)	Sultan Ismail Nasiruddin Shah Stadium
2000	Terengganu	Pulau Pinang	1–1 (4–3 pen.)	Batu Kawan Stadium
2001	Selangor	Sarawak	1–0	Bukit Jalil National Stadium
2002	Pulau Pinang	Perak	1–0	Bukit Jalil National Stadium
2003	Negeri Sembilan	Perlis	2–1	Perak Stadium
2004	Perak	Terengganu	3–0	Bukit Jalil National Stadium
2005	Selangor	Perak	4–2	Shah Alam Stadium
2006	Pahang	Perlis	0–0 (4–2 pen.)	Bukit Jalil National Stadium
2007	Kedah	Perlis	0–0 (4–2 pen.)	Batu Kawan Stadium
2008	Kedah	Selangor	3–2	Shah Alam Stadium
2009	Selangor	Kelantan	1–1 (4–1 pen.)	Bukit Jalil National Stadium
2010	Negeri Sembilan	Kedah	1–1 (5–4 pen.)	Bukit Jalil National Stadium
2011	Terengganu	Kelantan	2–1	Bukit Jalil National Stadium
2012	Kelantan	Sime Darby	1–0	Bukit Jalil National Stadium
2013	Kelantan	Johor Darul Ta'zim	1–0	Bukit Jalil National Stadium
2014	Pahang	Felda United	2–1	Shah Alam Stadium
2015	LionsXII	Kelantan	3–1	Bukit Jalil National Stadium
2016	Johor Darul Ta'zim	PKNS	2–1	Shah Alam Stadium
2017	Kedah	Pahang	3–2	Shah Alam Stadium
2018	Pahang	Selangor	2–0	Bukit Jalil National Stadium
2019	Kedah	Perak	1–0 (a.e.t.)	Bukit Jalil National Stadium
2020	Cancelled due to the COVID-19 pandemic			
2021	Not held			
2022	Johor Darul Ta'zim	Terengganu	3–1	Bukit Jalil National Stadium
2023	Johor Darul Ta'zim	Kuala Lumpur City	2–0	Sultan Ibrahim Stadium
2024	Johor Darul Ta'zim	Selangor	6–1	Bukit Jalil National Stadium
2025	Johor Darul Ta'zim	Sabah	5–0	Bukit Jalil National Stadium

== Performance by clubs ==
Teams shown in italics no longer exist or no longer compete in the competition.

No.	Club	Wins	Runners-up
1	Selangor	5	4
2	Kedah Darul Aman	5	1
2	Johor Darul Ta'zim	5	1
4	Sri Pahang	3	2
4	Kuala Lumpur City	3	2
6	Perak	2	4
7	Kelantan	2	3
7	Terengganu	2	3
9	Negeri Sembilan	2	—
10	Sabah	1	4
11	Sarawak	1	2
11	Penang	1	2
13	Johor FA	1	—
13	LionsXII	1	—
15	Perlis	—	3
16	Sime Darby	—	1
16	Felda United	—	1
16	PKNS	—	1

== See also ==
- Malaysian football league system
