= Sri Pahang FC =

Malaysian association football club

Sri Pahang
- Full name: Sri Pahang Football Club
- Nickname: Tok Gajah (The Elephants)
- Short name: SPFC
- Founded: 1959; 67 years ago (as Pahang FA); 2020; 6 years ago (as Sri Pahang FC)
- Ground: Darul Makmur Stadium; Temerloh Mini Stadium
- Capacity: 40,000; 10,000
- Owner(s): Tengku Abdul Rahman ibni Almarhum; Sultan Haji Ahmad Shah Al-Musta'in Billah
- 2024–25: Malaysia Super League, 8th of 13 (withdrew)
| Home colours | Away colours | Third colours |

Sri Pahang Football Club (Malay: Kelab Bola Sepak Sri Pahang) is a Malaysian professional football club based in Kuantan, Pahang. They played in the Malaysia Super League until 2025, the top tier of the Malaysian football league system. Founded in 1959, it has traditionally worn a yellow home kit since. At the beginning, club's home matches were held around the city public fields and outside Kuantan, predominantly around districts of Pahang.

The club was relegated to the Malaysia Premier League, but came back to the Malaysia Super League in 2013 after winning the play-off match against Kedah Darul Aman. Sri Pahang has won 5 Malaysia Super League title, 1 Malaysia Premier League title, 3 Malaysia FA Cup, 4 Malaysia Cup and 3 Malaysian Charity Shield.

On 20 June 2025, Sri Pahang F.C. have officially withdrawn from the 2025–26 Malaysian League season despite being granted a national licence by the MFL, citing of their serious financial problems.

== History ==
=== Early years (1959–1979) ===
Pahang FA was established by Sultan Abu Bakar in 1959 to represent the state of Pahang in the HMS Beagle Cup. Construction of their home ground, Darul Makmur Stadium, was completed by the Council of Kuantan in 1973.

=== Rise to prominence (1980–2008) ===
Led by the legendary Jamal Nasir, Pahang FA won the first cup in 1983, Piala Malaysia after a win over Selangor FA, breaking the long duopoly of them and Singapore FA. Nonetheless, the most successful era was in the 1990s, when the association reached the final of Piala Malaysia 4 times. 1992 was the year when the association won the double, the Piala Malaysia and the league. Sri Pahang year was touted as the Dream Team, when several high-profile players played for them (Dollah Salleh, Zainal Abidin Hassan, Ahmad Yusof, Khairul Azman Mohamed, Abdul Mubin Mokhtar, Australian football legend, Alan Davidson and Fandi Ahmad). The association defeated Kedah FA in final stage to win the Piala Malaysia, thanks to the fastest goal in Piala's history, scored by Zulhamizan Zakaria.

Pahang FA was also the winner of the inaugural Malaysia Super League in 2004, winning 14 matches with 5 draws and 2 losses in 21 league games. Pahang was invited to the 2005 ASEAN Club Championship in which they ended as runners-up, losing the final to Singaporean side Tampines Rovers. In 2008, many players from Shahzan Muda were absorbed into Pahang FA.

=== Inconsistency (2009–2012) ===
In the 2011, Pahang played their worst ever season, finishing in 13th place with 5 wins, 7 draws and 14 losses. They were relegated to the Malaysia Premier League. While in the Malaysia Premier League, Pahang showed improvements in the 2012 Malaysia FA Cup, making it to the quarter-finals. The club was also the 2012 Malaysia Premier League runner-up, 8 points behind ATM FA, qualifying for the promotion "play-off" matches to the Malaysia Super League. Pahang than beat Kedah FA 3–2 on penalties in the final, winning promotion to the 2013 Malaysia Super League.

=== Rise of The Elephants (2013–2018) ===
Pahang had a great run in the 2013 Malaysia Cup, reaching all the way to the final where they won against Kelantan FA 1–0. Azamuddin Akil won the Best Player award, while Matías Conti become the joint top scorer. In the 2014 Malaysia Cup, Pahang made it all the way to the final in which they successfully defended it against Johor, winning 5–3. Dickson Nwakaeme became the cup top scorer with eight goals. Pahang also won the 2014 Piala Sumbangsih against LionsXII, and the final in which Faizol Hussien levelled at 1–1, before Nwakaeme scored to seal the win for Pahang and win the cup double.

In 2018 Pahang had another great run in the FA Cup in which they won 2–0 against Selangor FA in the final after losing 2–3 to Kedah FA in the final of the 2017 Malaysia FA Cup.

=== Ups and downs (2019–2025) ===
In 2021, Pahang FA was rebranded as Sri Pahang Football Club.

Sri Pahang sees hope during the 2024–25 Malaysia Cup where they defeated Selangor 4–3 on aggregate in the round of 16. During the second leg of the quarter-final match on 22 December 2024, Manuel Hidalgo scored a hat-trick against Perak in a 3–3 draw which saw Sri Pahang advance to the semi-final with a 4–3 aggregate. In the semi-finals second leg, Kpah Sherman scored in extra time to bring the aggregate to 3–2 which saw Sri Pahang advance to the 2025 Malaysia Cup final, which they eventually lost.

Despite being granted a national licence by the MFL, Sri Pahang confirmed their withdrawal from the Malaysia Super League on 20 June 2025. Sri Pahang’s absence means the 2025–26 Super League will feature only 13 teams.

== Kit manufacturers and shirt sponsors ==
| Period | Manufacturer | Main sponsor | Other sponsors |
|---|---|---|---|
| 1989–1990 | (Germany) Schwarzenbach | (United Kingdom) Dunhill | Genting Malaysia Berhad |
| 1991 | (Germany) Puma | (United Kingdom) Dunhill | Genting Malaysia Berhad |
| 1992–1998 | (Italy) Diadora | (United Kingdom) Dunhill | Genting Malaysia Berhad |
| 1999–2000 | (Japan) Mikasa | (United Kingdom) Dunhill | Genting Malaysia Berhad |
| 2001–2003 | (Italy) Kronos | (United Kingdom) Dunhill | Genting Malaysia Berhad |
| 2004–2005 | (Germany) Adidas | (United Kingdom) Dunhill | Genting Malaysia Berhad |
| 2006–2007 | (Germany) Adidas | (Malaysia) TM | Genting Malaysia Berhad |
| 2008 | (Denmark) Hummel | (Malaysia) TM | Genting Malaysia Berhad |
| 2009–2010 | (Italy) Lotto | (Malaysia) TM | Genting Malaysia Berhad |
| 2011 | (Italy) Lotto | (Malaysia) ZON Hotel | Genting Malaysia Berhad |
| 2012 | (Italy) Lotto | (Malaysia) Resorts World Genting | (Malaysia) Aras Kuasa |
| 2013 | (Australia) Stobi | (Malaysia) Resorts World Genting | (United States) Chili's |
| 2014–2016 | (Germany) Puma | (Malaysia) Aras Kuasa | (Malaysia) Resorts World Genting |
| 2017 | (Germany) Jako | (Malaysia) Aras Kuasa | (Malaysia) Resorts World Genting |
| July 2017–2018 | (Italy) Fila | (Malaysia) Aras Kuasa | (Malaysia) Resorts World Genting |
| 2019–2020 | (United Kingdom) Umbro | (Malaysia) Aras Kuasa | (Malaysia) Football Republic |
| 2021–2023 | (Malaysia) Hakka.Clo | (Malaysia) Visit Pahang, Invest Pahang | (Indonesia) Extra Joss |
| 2024–2025 | (Malaysia) Voltra Pro | (Malaysia) Invest Pahang | (Malaysia) Arwana Ekspres |

== Stadium ==
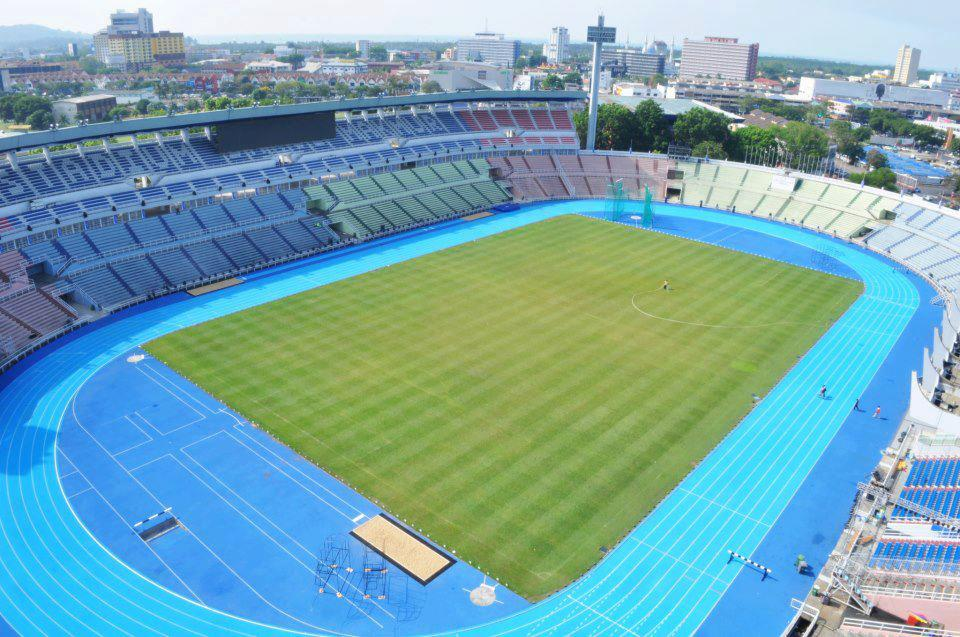
Darul Makmur Stadium has been the home ground of the club since 1970.

Sri Pahang was based at Darul Makmur Stadium in Kuantan, Pahang. The capacity of the stadium is 40,000 and also has a running track. It was opened in 1970, while capacity was increased in conjunction with Kuantan hosting the Sukma Games in 1996 and 2012.

== Players (2025) ==
Note: Flags indicate national team as defined under FIFA eligibility rules; some limited exceptions apply. Players may hold more than one non-FIFA nationality.

| No. | Pos. | Nation | Player |
|---|---|---|---|
| 1 | GK | MAS | Zarif Irfan |
| 3 | DF | MAS | Adam Nor Azlin |
| 4 | MF | MAS | Asnan Ahmad |
| 5 | DF | SRB | Aleksandar Cvetković |
| 6 | DF | MAS | Syazwan Andik |
| 7 | DF | MAS | Aiman Asyraf |
| 9 | FW | LBR | Kpah Sherman |
| 11 | FW | UKR | Mykola Ahapov |
| 13 | DF | MAS | Ashar Al Aafiz Abdullah |
| 15 | DF | ARG | Stefano Brundo |
| 16 | FW | MAS | Ezequiel Agüero |

| No. | Pos. | Nation | Player |
|---|---|---|---|
| 18 | GK | MAS | Azfar Arif |
| 20 | MF | MAS | Azam Azih |
| 23 | DF | MAS | Azwan Aripin |
| 25 | GK | MAS | Wan Mohd Syazmin (on loan from Kedah Darul Aman) |
| 26 | MF | MAS | T. Saravanan |
| 27 | DF | MAS | Fadhli Shas |
| 29 | DF | MAS | Azrif Nasrulhaq Badrul Hisham |
| 35 | FW | MAS | Syaahir Saiful Nizam |
| 38 | MF | MAS | Adam Alif Mustapa |
| 44 | DF | MAS | Hasnul Zaim |
| 88 | MF | MAS | Manuel Hidalgo (on loan from Johor Darul Ta'zim) |

=== From Under-23s ===
Note: Flags indicate national team as defined under FIFA eligibility rules; some limited exceptions apply. Players may hold more than one non-FIFA nationality.

| No. | Pos. | Nation | Player |
|---|---|---|---|
| — | MF | MAS | Nasyrullah Zaki |
| — | MF | MAS | Adam Malique |

| No. | Pos. | Nation | Player |
|---|---|---|---|
| — | FW | MAS | Aqil Arazi |
| — | FW | MAS | Lokman Bah Din |

== Club officials (2025) ==
| Position | Nat | Staff |
|---|---|---|
| Technical director | (Malaysia) | Tajuddin Noor |
| Team manager | (Malaysia) | Dollah Salleh |
| Head coach | | Vacant |
| Assistant coach | (Malaysia) | Ahmad Yusof |
| Assistant coach | (Malaysia) | Ahmad Shaharuddin |
| Team coordinator | (Malaysia) | Jalaluddin Jaafar |
| Opposition & Set Piece Analyst / Coach | (Singapore) | Rudie Imran Masih |
| Goalkeeper coach | (Malaysia) | Omar Salim |
| Fitness coach | (Malaysia) | Azmi Ibrahim |
| Team doctor | (Malaysia) | Shah Rezal Sujit |
| Physiotherapist | (Malaysia) | Adam Zuhairy Zafri |
| Physiotherapist | (Malaysia) | Mohd Riduan Amin |
| Masseur | (Malaysia) | Muhd Hazeem Mustafar Kamal |
| Masseur | (Malaysia) | Mohd Suhaimi Ramli |
| Security officer | (Malaysia) | Muhammad Keny Anyie |
| Kitman | (Malaysia) | Ahmad Faizal Ibrahim |
| Kitman | (Malaysia) | Suffian Sulaiman |
| Under-23's team manager | (Malaysia) | Jalaluddin Mohd Deli |
| Under-23's head coach | (Malaysia) | Mohd Yazeed Hamzah |
| Under-23's assistant coach | (Malaysia) | Shahrizan Salleh |
| Under-20's head coach | (Malaysia) | Mohd Shukri ismail |
| Under-20's assistant coach | (Malaysia) | Mohd Ali Tahar |
| Under-20's goalkeeper coach | (Malaysia) | Zakaria Abu Bakar |
| Under-20's fitness coach | (Malaysia) | Mohd Kaizai Zainulddin |
| Under-20's physiotherapist | (Malaysia) | Amirul Afiq Lokiman |
| Under-20's masseur | (Malaysia) | Muhd Azrie Amirudin |
| Under-18's head coach | (Malaysia) | Hamdan Mohamad |
| Under-18's assistant coach | (Malaysia) | Mohd Hazrani Hazim |
| Under-18's goalkeeper coach | (Malaysia) | Muhd Zyuraimi Abdul majid |
| Under-18's fitness coach | (Malaysia) | Mohd Rosidi Mohamad Abdullah |
| Under-18's physiotherapist | (Malaysia) | Mumtazah Putra |

=== Management ===
Owners: YAM Tengku Abdul Rahman Ibni Sultan Ahmad Shah Al-Mustafi Billah, Raja Dato' Shaharudin bin Raja Jalil Shah, Rizal bin Che Hashim

President: YAM Tengku Abdul Rahman Ibni Sultan Ahmad Shah Al-Mustafi Billah

Deputy president: Muhammad Safian Ismail

Board of directors: Raja Dato' Shaharudin bin Raja Jalil Shah, Rizal bin Che Hashim

Chief executive officer: Suffian Awang

== List of head coaches ==
| Years | Nat | Name | Achievements |
|---|---|---|---|
| 1994–1996 | (Malaysia) | Yunus Alif | – 1995 Liga Perdana – 1999 Liga Perdana 1 |
| 1997–1998 | (Denmark) | Jorgen Erik Larsen | |
| 1999 | (Australia) | Alan Davidson | |
| 1999–2000 | (Malaysia) | Fuzzeimi Ibrahim | |
| 2001–2002 | (Malaysia) | Yunus Alif | |
| 2003 | (Brazil) | Ralf Borges Ferreira | |
| 2004–2006 | (Malaysia) | Zainal Abidin Hassan | – 2004 Malaysia Super League |
| 2007 | (Malaysia) | Ahmad Yusof | |
| 2008 | (Malaysia) | Zainal Abidin Hassan | |
| 2009 | (Malaysia) | Tajuddin Noor | |
| 2010–2013 | (Malaysia) | Dollah Salleh | – 2013 Malaysia Cup |
| December 2013–March 2014 | (England) | Ron Smith | – 2014 Piala Sumbangsih |
| March 2014–December 2015 | (Malaysia) | Zainal Abidin Hassan | – 2014 Malaysia FA Cup – 2014 Malaysia Cup |
| December 2015–March 2016 | (Malaysia) | Ahmad Shaharuddin Rosdi | |
| March 2016–December 2016 | (Malaysia) | Razip Ismail | |
| December 2016–December 2020 | (Malaysia) | Dollah Salleh (2) | – 2018 Malaysia FA Cup |
| December 2020–March 2021 | (United States) | Thomas Dooley | |
| March 2021–December 2021 | (Malaysia) | Dollah Salleh (3) | |
| January 2022–July 2022 | (France) | Christophe Gamel | |
| July 2022–January 2023 | (Malaysia) | Dollah Salleh [interim] (4) | |
| January 2023–May 2025 | (Singapore) | Fandi Ahmad | |

=== Team managers ===
| Years | Nat | Name |
|---|---|---|
| 1999 | (Malaysia) | Talib Sulaiman |
| 2000–2003 | (Malaysia) | Jamal Nasir Abdul Nasir Ismail |
| 2004–2005 | (Malaysia) | Shahiruddin Abdul Moin |
| 2006–2007 | (Malaysia) | Zainal Abidin Hassan |
| 2008 | (Malaysia) | Omar Othman |
| 2009–2017 | (Malaysia) | Che Nasir Salleh |
| 2018–2021 | (Malaysia) | Suffian Awang |
| 2021–2022 | (Malaysia) | Che Nasir Salleh |
| 2023–2025 | (Malaysia) | Dollah Salleh |

== Club records ==
- Pld = Played, W = Won, D = Drawn, L = Lost, F = Goals for, A = Goals against, D = Goal difference, Pts= Points, Pos = Position

1st or Champions 2nd or Runner-up 3rd place Promotion Relegation

| Season | League | | | | | | | | | | Cup | | | Asia | |
| Season | Division | Pld | W | D | L | F | A | D | Pts | Pos | Charity | Malaysia | FA | Competition | Result |
|---|---|---|---|---|---|---|---|---|---|---|---|---|---|---|---|
| 2004 | Liga Super | 21 | 14 | 5 | 2 | 48 | 29 | +19 | 47 | 1st | – | Semi-finals | Semi-finals | | |
| 2005 | Liga Super | 21 | 10 | 5 | 6 | 37 | 29 | +8 | 35 | 2nd | – | Quarter-finals | 1st round | AFC Cup | Group stage |
| 2005–06 | Liga Super | 21 | 7 | 6 | 8 | 21 | 24 | −3 | 27 | 7th | – | Group stage | Champions | – | – |
| 2006–07 | Liga Super | 24 | 7 | 6 | 11 | 32 | 41 | −9 | 27 | 9th | – | Group stage | 2nd round | AFC Cup | Group stage |
| 2007–08 | Liga Super | 24 | 8 | 6 | 10 | 26 | 31 | −5 | 30 | 8th | – | Group stage | Semi-finals | – | – |
| 2009 | Liga Super | 26 | 5 | 2 | 19 | 32 | 63 | −31 | 17 | 13th | – | Group stage | 1st round | | |
| 2010 | Liga Super | 26 | 10 | 3 | 13 | 31 | 50 | −19 | 33 | 8th | – | Quarter-finals | 1st round | | |
| 2011 | Liga Super | 26 | 5 | 7 | 14 | 19 | 36 | −17 | 22 | 13th | | Play-off | Semi-finals | | |
| 2012 | Liga Premier | 22 | 14 | 4 | 4 | 60 | 29 | +31 | 46 | 2nd | – | Quarter-finals | 2nd round | | |
| 2013 | Liga Super | 22 | 10 | 5 | 7 | 36 | 32 | +4 | 35 | 5th | | Champions | Semi-finals | – | – |
| 2014 | Liga Super | 22 | 11 | 4 | 7 | 36 | 30 | +6 | 37 | 3rd | Champions | Champions | Champions | | |
| 2015 | Liga Super | 22 | 13 | 5 | 4 | 43 | 29 | +14 | 38 (Note: Pahang was deducted 6 points due to involvement in the delay in the process of solving the problem of salary and compensation by the former imports 2013 season, Mohamed Borji.) | 3rd | Runner-up | Semi-finals | Semi-finals | AFC Cup | Quarter-finals |
| 2016 | Liga Super | 22 | 6 | 6 | 10 | 25 | 40 | −15 | 24 (Note: Pahang has been awarded 3 points free from the Football Association of Malaysia (FAM) after offenses committed by the Football Association of Kedah (Kedah FA) putting the suspended player during the match against Pahang on August 3, 2016.) | 9th | – | Group stage | 3rd round | – | – |
| 2017 | Liga Super | 22 | 12 | 4 | 6 | 44 | 26 | +18 | 40 | 2nd | – | Quarter-finals | Runner-up | – | – |
| 2018 | Liga Super | 22 | 9 | 7 | 6 | 35 | 21 | +14 | 34 | 4th | – | Quarter-finals | Champions | – | – |
| 2019 | Liga Super | 22 | 12 | 7 | 3 | 37 | 21 | +16 | 43 | 2nd | – | Semi-finals | Semi-finals | | |
| 2020 | Liga Super | 11 | 4 | 2 | 5 | 18 | 18 | 0 | 14 | 8th | – | not held | not held | | |
| 2021 | Liga Super | 22 | 4 | 6 | 12 | 23 | 37 | -14 | 18 | 10th | – | Group Stage | not held | | |
| 2022 | Liga Super | 22 | 8 | 4 | 10 | 33 | 31 | +2 | 28 | 7th | – | Round of 16 | Quarter Final | | |
| 2023 | Liga Super | 26 | 13 | 6 | 7 | 44 | 33 | +11 | 45 | 5th | – | Quarter Final | Second round | | |
| 2024–25 | Liga Super | 24 | 7 | 8 | 9 | 35 | 39 | -4 | 29 | 7th | – | Runner-up | Round of 16 | | |

=== AFC Club ranking ===
As of 2 July 2017

| Current Ranking | Team | Points |
|---|---|---|
| 94 | (Malaysia) Selangor FA | 9.951 |
| 95 | (Myanmar) Ayeyawady United | 9.878 |
| 96 | (Iraq) Naft Al-Wasat | 9.704 |
| 97 | (Oman) Al-Suwaiq | 9.643 |
| 98 | (Malaysia) Pahang FA | 9.617 |

== Continental record ==
| Season | Competition | Round | Club | Home | Away | Aggregate |
|---|---|---|---|---|---|---|
| 1988–89 | Asian Club Championship | Qualifying round group 5 | (Thailand) Royal Thai Air Force | 1–2 | | 2nd out of 5 |
| 1988–89 | Asian Club Championship | Qualifying round group 5 | (Indonesia) Niac Mitra | 0–0 | | 2nd out of 5 |
| 1988–89 | Asian Club Championship | Qualifying round group 5 | (Brunei) Bandaran KB | 5–1 | | 2nd out of 5 |
| 1988–89 | Asian Club Championship | Qualifying round group 5 | (Singapore) Geylang International | 2–1 | | 2nd out of 5 |
| 1988–89 | Asian Club Championship | Semifinal League group B | (Qatar) Al-Sadd | 0–2 | | 5th out of 5 |
| 1988–89 | Asian Club Championship | Semifinal League group B | (Saudi Arabia) Al-Ittifaq | 1–4 | | 5th out of 5 |
| 1988–89 | Asian Club Championship | Semifinal League group B | (Bangladesh) Mohammedan SC | 2–1 | | 5th out of 5 |
| 1988–89 | Asian Club Championship | Semifinal League group B | (North Korea) April 25 | 0–2 | | 5th out of 5 |
| 1993–94 | Asian Club Championship | Preliminary Round | (Thailand) Thai Farmers Bank FC | Withdrew | | |
| 1995 | Asian Club Championship | First Round | (Vietnam) Cảng Sài Gòn | Walkover | | |
| 1995 | Asian Club Championship | Second Round | (South Korea) Ilhwa Chunma | 2–3 | 0–2 | 2–5 |
| 2005 | AFC Cup | Group E | (Singapore) Home United | 3–3 | 1–2 | 3rd out of 4 |
| 2005 | AFC Cup | Group E | (Maldives) New Radiant | 1–0 | 1–1 | 3rd out of 4 |
| 2005 | AFC Cup | Group E | (Hong Kong) Happy Valley | 3–1 | 1–1 | 3rd out of 4 |
| 2005 | ASEAN Club Championship | Group A | (Vietnam) Hoàng Anh Gia Lai | 4–0 | | 1st out of 4 |
| 2005 | ASEAN Club Championship | Group A | (Timor-Leste) FC Zebra | 8–0 | | 1st out of 4 |
| 2005 | ASEAN Club Championship | Group A | (Cambodia) Nagacorp | 3–0 | | 1st out of 4 |
| 2005 | ASEAN Club Championship | Semi Final | (Brunei) DPMM FC | 1–0 | | |
| 2005 | ASEAN Club Championship | Final | (Singapore) Tampines Rovers | 2–4 | | Runners-up |
| 2007 | AFC Cup | Group F | (Thailand) Osotsapa | 0–4 | 0–4 | 4th out of 4 |
| 2007 | AFC Cup | Group F | (India) Mohun Bagan | 1–2 | 0–2 | 4th out of 4 |
| 2007 | AFC Cup | Group F | (Singapore) Tampines Rovers | 1–4 | 0–2 | 4th out of 4 |
| 2015 | AFC Cup | Group G | (Myanmar) Yadanarbon | 7–4 | 3–2 | 2nd out of 4 |
| 2015 | AFC Cup | Group G | (Philippines) Global | 0–0 | 0–0 | 2nd out of 4 |
| 2015 | AFC Cup | Group G | (Hong Kong) South China | 0–1 | 1–3 | 2nd out of 4 |
| 2015 | AFC Cup | Round of 16 | (Indonesia) Persipura Jayapura | Forfeited, 3–0 win awarded to Pahang | | |
| 2015 | AFC Cup | Quarterfinal | (Tajikistan) Istiklol | 3–1 | 0–4 | 3–5 |

== Honours ==
=== Domestic ===
League

- Division 1/Liga Super
  - Winners (5): 1987, 1992, 1995, 1999, 2004
  - Runners-up (6): 1984, 1991, 1998, 2005, 2017, 2019
- Division 2/Premier League
  - Runner-up: 2012

Cup

- Malaysia Cup
  - Winners (4): 1983, 1992, 2013, 2014
  - Runners-up (5): 1984, 1994, 1995, 1997, 2024–25
- Malaysia FA Cup
  - Winners (3): 2006, 2014, 2018
  - Runners-up (2): 1995, 2017
- Piala Sumbangsih
  - Winners (3): 1992, 1993, 2014
  - Runners-up (5): 1985, 1988, 1995, 2007, 2015

Others

- eMFL Malaysia Cup
  - Winners (1): 2024–25

=== Continental ===
- ASEAN Club Championship
  - Runner-up (1): 2005

== See also ==
- List of Malaysia Football Chairman
