= 2014 Malaysia Super League =

Liga Super
- Season: 2014
- Dates: 17 January - 25 June 2014
- Champions: Johor Darul Ta'zim; 1st Super League title 1st Liga M title
- Relegated: T-Team; PKNS
- AFC Champions League: Johor Darul Ta'zim (Qualifying play-off)
- AFC Cup: Johor Darul Ta'zim; Pahang
- Matches: 132
- Goals: 347 (2.63 per match)
- Top goalscorer: Paulo Rangel (16 goals)
- Biggest home win: Sime Darby 4–0 Kelantan (15 April 2014) Sime Darby 4–0 Perak (14 Jun 2014)
- Biggest away win: ATM 0–3 Terengganu (25 March 2014) Pahang 1–4 Terengganu (24 May 2014) Terengganu 1–4 Selangor (10 Jun 2014)
- Highest scoring: Johor Darul Ta'zim 4–3 Terengganu (13 Jun 2014)
- Longest winning run: 5 games Pahang (From Game 8 to Game 12)
- Longest unbeaten run: 12 games Johor Darul Ta'zim (From Game 8 to Game 19)
- Longest winless run: 11 games ATM
- Longest losing run: 6 games Perak
- Highest attendance: 70,000; Selangor 0–1 Johor Darul Ta'zim (24 May 2014)
- Lowest attendance: 300; T-Team 1–1 Perak (22 March 2014)
- Total attendance: 1,348,973
- Average attendance: 10,219
- All statistics correct as of 28 June 2014.

The 2014 Liga Super (English: 2014 Super League), also known as the Astro Liga Super for sponsorship reasons, is the 11th season of the Liga Super, the top-tier professional football league in Malaysia.

The season was held from 17 January and concluded on 25 June 2014.

The Liga Super champions for 2014 was Johor Darul Ta'zim and this season was the start of them winning the league every season until today.

== Major changes ==
The following are the key changes of 2014 Liga Super season as compared to the previous season:

- The 2014 Piala Sumbangsih match between LionsXII and Pahang will also be a Liga Super match. Results of the 90-minute match will be counted towards the league table classification. The last time this happened was during the 2011 Liga Super season.
- Goal-line referees will be introduced in selected matches during the season, and will be fully implemented for all matches in the 2015 Liga Super season if the feedback is positive.
- A total of 4 foreign players can be registered by Liga Super teams, including at least one player from AFC countries. A maximum of 3 foreign players can be fielded at one time in a match. The announcement was made by FAM during the exco meeting in November 2013, following a decision to upgrade the foreign players quota from 2 in 2013 to 3 in the April 2013 meeting.

== Team changes ==
The following teams have changed division.

=== To Malaysia Super League ===
Promoted from Premier League

- Sarawak
- Sime Darby

=== From Malaysia Super League ===
Relegated to Premier League

- Felda United
- Negeri Sembilan

== Teams ==
A total of 12 teams compete in the 2014 season which includes the top 10 teams that participated in the 2013 season and champions and runners-up of the 2013 Liga Premier.

Felda United and Negeri Sembilan were relegated at the end of the 2013 Liga Super season after finishing in the bottom place of the league table.

2012 Liga Premier unbeaten champions Sarawak and runners-up Sime Darby secured direct promotion to the Liga Super.

Team	Team Based	Stadium	Capacity^{1}
ATM	Selayang	Selayang Stadium	20,000
Johor Darul Ta'zim	Johor Bahru	Larkin Stadium	30,000
Kelantan	Kota Bharu	Sultan Mohammad IV Stadium	22,000
LionsXII	Singapore	Jalan Besar Stadium^{2}	8,000
Pahang	Kuantan	Darul Makmur Stadium	40,000
Perak	Ipoh	Perak Stadium	60,000
PKNS	Petaling Jaya	MBPJ Stadium	25,000
Sarawak	Kuching	Sarawak State Stadium	26,000
Selangor	Shah Alam	Shah Alam Stadium^{3}	80,372
Sime Darby	Kuala Lumpur	Selayang Stadium	20,000
T-Team	Kuala Terengganu	Sultan Ismail Nasiruddin Shah Stadium	15,000
Terengganu	Kuala Terengganu	Sultan Ismail Nasiruddin Shah Stadium	15,000

- ^{1} Correct as of end of 2013 Liga Super season
- ^{2} LionsXII uses the Bishan Stadium until the end of January 2014 due to renovation work being done at Jalan Besar Stadium.
- ^{3} Selangor uses the MBPJ Stadium until 25 February 2014 due to renovation work being done at Shah Alam Stadium.

=== Stadiums and locations ===
Locations of teams in the 2014 Liga Super

=== Personnel and sponsoring ===
Note: Flags indicate national team as has been defined under FIFA eligibility rules. Players may hold more than one non-FIFA nationality.

Team	Head coach	Captain	Kit manufacturer	Shirt sponsor
ATM	(Malaysia) B. Sathianathan	(Malaysia) Hairuddin Omar	Lotto	Ecobumi
Johor DT	(Croatia) Bojan Hodak	(Malaysia) Mohd Aidil Zafuan Abdul Radzak	Nike	Country Garden
Kelantan	(Netherlands) George Boateng	(Malaysia) Badhri Radzi	Warriors	Hotlink
LionsXII	(Singapore) Fandi Ahmad	(Singapore) Safuwan Baharudin	Nike	StarHub
Pahang	(Malaysia) Zainal Abidin Hassan	(Malaysia) Mohd Razman Roslan	Puma	Aras Kuasa
Perak	(Malaysia) Abu Bakar Fadzim	(Malaysia) Mohammad Hardi Jaafar	Joma	Lembaga Air Perak
PKNS	(Malaysia) Wan Jamak	(Malaysia) Helmi Remeli	Lotto	PKNS
Sarawak	(Netherlands) Robert Alberts	(Malaysia) Joseph Kalang Tie	Starsports	Sarawak Energy
Selangor	(Australia) Mehmet Durakovic	(Malaysia) Bunyamin Umar	Kappa	Selangor
Sime Darby	(Malaysia) Ismail Zakaria	(Malaysia) Juzaili Samion	Kappa	Sime Darby
T-Team	(Malaysia) Mohd Azraai Khor Abdullah	(Malaysia) Mohd Marzuki Yusof	Line 7	EPIC
Terengganu	(Malaysia) Abdul Rahman Ibrahim	(Malaysia) Ismail Faruqi Asha'ri	Umbro	Desa Murni Batik

=== Kits ===
ATM		Johor Darul Ta'zim			Kelantan		LionsXII		
Home	Away	Home	Away	Alternate	Home	Away	Home	Away	Alternate
Kit Manufacturer: Lotto		Kit Manufacturer: Nike			Kit Manufacturer: Warriors		Kit Manufacturer: Nike		
Main Sponsor: Ecobumi		Main Sponsor: Country Garden			Main Sponsor: Hotlink		Main Sponsor: StarHub		

Pahang			Perak			PKNS		
Home	Away	Alternate	Home	Away	Alternate	Home	Away	Alternate
Kit Manufacturer: Puma			Kit Manufacturer: Joma			Kit Sponsor: Lotto		
Main Sponsor: Resort World			Main Sponsor: Lembaga Air Perak			Main Sponsor: PKNS		

Sarawak			Selangor			Sime Darby	
Home	Away	Alternate	Home	Away	Alternate	Home	Away
Kit Manufacturer: Starsports			Kit Manufacturer: Kappa			Kit Manufacturer: Kappa	
Main Sponsor: Sarawak Energy			Main Sponsor: Selangor			Main Sponsor: Sime Darby	

T-Team FC			Terengganu	
Home	Away	Alternate	Home	Away
Kit Manufacturer: Line7			Kit Manufacturer: Umbro	
Main Sponsor: EPIC			Main Sponsor: Desa Murni Batik	

=== Coaching changes ===
- Except for the two promoted teams Sime Darby FC and Sarawak FA, all other teams have new head coaches at the start of the season.

Team	Outgoing Head Coach	Manner of departure	Date of vacancy	Incoming Head Coach	Date of appointment
Johor DT	(Singapore) Fandi Ahmad	Resigned	19 August 2013	(Spain) César Ferrando	21 October 2013
Selangor	(Malaysia) Irfan Bakti	Resigned	28 August 2013	(Australia) Mehmet Durakovic	31 October 2013
Terengganu	(Malaysia) E. Elavarasan	End of contract	1 October 2013	(Malaysia) Abdul Rahman	9 October 2013
LionsXII	(Singapore) V. Sundramoorthy	End of contract	7 October 2013	(Singapore) Fandi Ahmad	7 December 2013
Perak	(Malaysia) Azraai Khor	Resigned	21 October 2013	(Malaysia) Abu Bakar Fadzim	22 October 2013
PKNS	(Malaysia) Abdul Rahman	End of contract	30 October 2013	(Malaysia) Wan Jamak	10 October 2013
Kelantan	(Croatia) Bojan Hodak	End of contract	15 November 2013	(England) Steve Darby	15 November 2013
T-Team	(Malaysia) Che Ku Marzuki	End of contract	November 2013	(Malaysia) Azraai Khor	13 November 2013
Pahang	(Malaysia) Dollah Salleh	End of contract	November 2013	(England) Ron Smith	November 2013
Pahang	(England) Ron Smith	End of contract	6 March 2014	(Malaysia) Zainal Abidin Hassan (interim)	6 March 2014
Kelantan	(England) Steve Darby	Relieved	15 April 2014	(Malaysia) Hashim Mustapha (interim)	15 April 2014
Johor DT	(Spain) César Ferrando	Relieved	April 2014	(Croatia) Bojan Hodak (interim)	April 2014
Kelantan	(Malaysia) Hashim Mustapha (interim)	End of interim	April 2014	(Netherlands) George Boateng	April 2014

=== Foreign players ===
Club	Visa 1	Visa 2	Visa 3	Visa 4 (Asian)	Former Player(s)
ATM	(Argentina) Bruno Martelotto	(Argentina) Juan Arostegui	(Haiti) Fabrice Noël	(South Korea) Park Yong-Ho	(Australia) Spase Dilevski (Saint Vincent and the Grenadines) Marlon James
Johor Darul Ta'zim	(Argentina) Luciano Figueroa	(Argentina) Jorge Pereyra Díaz	(Brazil) Marcos Antonio	(Singapore) Hariss Harun	(Argentina) Pablo Aimar (Singapore) Baihakki Khaizan
Kelantan	(Egypt) Mohamed Shawky	(Ghana) Prince Tagoe	(Liberia) Francis Doe	(Iraq) Hussein Alaa Hussein	(Lebanon) Mohamad Ghaddar (Nigeria) Obinna Nwaneri
LionsXII	NA	NA	NA	NA	NA
Pahang	(Argentina) Matías Conti	(Jamaica) Damion Stewart	(Nigeria) Dickson Nwakaeme	(Pakistan) Zesh Rahman	NA
Perak	(Brazil) Marco Tulio	(Montenegro) Milan Purovic	(Nigeria) Abdulafees Abdulsalam	(Lebanon) Hassan Daher	(Brazil) Eliel Cruz (Bosnia and Herzegovina) Želimir Terkeš (Burkina Faso) Martin Kafando (Myanmar) Kyaw Zayar Win
PKNS	(Croatia) Karlo Primorac	(Liberia) Patrick Wleh	(South Korea) Kim Dong-Chan	(Indonesia) Hamka Hamzah	NA
Sarawak	(Bosnia and Herzegovina) Muamer Salibašić	(Hungary) Gábor Gyepes	(Lebanon) Hassan Mohamad	(Australia) Ryan Griffiths	(Serbia) Milorad Janjuš (Iran) Alireza Abbasfard
Selangor	(Australia) Steve Pantelidis	(Brazil) Paulo Rangel	(Brazil) Evaldo	(Indonesia) Andik Vermansyah	(Brazil) Juninho
Sime Darby	(Croatia) Mateo Roskam	(Ghana) William Mensah	(Syria) Mahmoud Amnah	(Uzbekistan) Dilshod Sharofetdinov	(Uzbekistan) Davron Khashimov
T-Team	(Australia) Goran Šubara	(Brazil) Leandro Dos Santos	(Rwanda) Jimmy Mulisa	(Indonesia) Patrich Wanggai	(Brazil) Fábio Flor (Turkey) Damir Ibrić
Terengganu	(Cameroon) Vincent Bikana	(Colombia) Javier Estupiñán	(Senegal) Moustapha Dabo	(Australia) Mario Karlović	(Brazil) Márcio Souza (Guinea) Mamadou Barry

Note:

- LionsXII will not be permitted to have any foreign players as it is intended to remain as a development team for Singaporean players.

== League table ==
Pos	Team	Pld	W	D	L	GF	GA	GD	Pts	Qualification or relegation
1	Johor Darul Ta'zim	22	13	5	4	39	22	+17	44	2015 AFC Champions League qualifying play-off
2	Selangor	22	12	5	5	28	19	+9	41	
3	Pahang	22	11	4	7	36	30	+6	37	2015 AFC Cup group stage (Note: Qualified as 2014 Piala FA winners)
4	Terengganu	22	10	6	6	38	28	+10	36	
5	Sime Darby	22	9	4	9	32	32	0	31	
6	Kelantan	22	10	1	11	26	29	−3	31	
7	Sarawak	22	9	3	10	26	31	−5	30	
8	LionsXII (Note: LionsXII are not eligible for any AFC competition spots)	22	8	4	10	26	27	−1	28	
9	Perak	22	8	2	12	22	27	−5	26	
10	ATM	22	6	6	10	29	34	−5	24	
11	T–Team	22	6	6	10	21	28	−7	24	Relegation to 2015 Liga Premier
12	PKNS	22	4	6	12	24	40	−16	18	Relegation to 2015 Liga Premier

Source: RSSSF, FAM Official Site, Astro Arena
Rules for classification: 1) points; 2) goal difference; 3) number of goals scored

== Results ==
Fixtures and Results of the Liga Super 2014 season.

=== Week 1 ===
17 January	Pahang	1–0	(Singapore) LionsXII	Darul Makmur Stadium, Kuantan, Pahang
20:45 UTC+08:00	Conti 57'; Hafiz (yellow card) 85'		Isa (yellow card) 39'; Zulfahmi (yellow card) 66'	Attendance: 34,000; Referee: Mohd. Nafeez Abdul Wahab (Johor)

18 January	Selangor	2–0	(Terengganu) T-Team	Petaling Jaya Stadium, Kelana Jaya, Selangor
16:45 UTC+08:00	Rangel 65', 72'; Rizal (yellow card) 56'; Gurusamy (yellow card) 90+4'		Fábio (yellow card) 22'; Azrul (yellow card) 41'; Hattaphon (yellow card) 47'; Faizal (yellow card) 69'	Attendance: 5,000; Referee: Muhd. Zamzaidi Katimin (Melaka)

18 January	Johor Darul Ta'zim	2–0	Perak	Tan Sri Dato Haji Hassan Yunos Stadium, Larkin, Johor
20:45 UTC+08:00	Amri 39'; Fazly (yellow card) 58'; Baihakki (yellow card) 80'; Figueroa 88'		Raffi (yellow card) 26' (yellow card) 85' (red card); Kafando (yellow card) 52'; Tuah (yellow card) 65'	Attendance: 25,000; Referee: Suhaizi Shukri (Melaka)

18 January	Terengganu	2–1	(Selangor) PKNS	Sultan Ismail Nasiruddin Shah Stadium, Kuala Terengganu, Terengganu
20:45 UTC+08:00	Barry 22', 66'; Nordin (yellow card) 55'		Hamka 18'; Fauzan (yellow card) 27'	Attendance: 9,600; Referee: Nagor Amir Noor Mohamed (Johor)

18 January	ATM	2–0	Sarawak	Majlis Perbandaran Selayang Stadium, Selayang, Selangor
20:45 UTC+08:00	Marlon 16'; Christie 35'; Norfazly (yellow card) 45+1'; Rezal (yellow card) 52'		Hairol (yellow card) 73'	Attendance: 5,000; Referee: Wan Mohd Tarmizi Wan Ibrahim (Selangor)

18 January	Kelantan	2–1	(Kuala Lumpur) Sime Darby	Sultan Muhammad IV Stadium, Kota Bharu, Kelantan
20:45 UTC+08:00	Ghaddar 60', 81' (pen.); Amar (yellow card) 83'		Fadzli 8'; Dzulfahmi (yellow card) 41'; Kamarul (yellow card) 56'	Attendance: 25,000; Referee: Muhd Nazmi Nasaruddin (Pulau Pinang)

=== Week 2 ===
24 January	PKNS (Selangor)	1–0	ATM	Majlis Perbandaran Selayang Stadium, Selayang, Selangor
20:45 UTC+08:00	Patrick 73'; Nazmi (yellow card) 88'; Shahrul (yellow card) 90+4'		Reuben (yellow card) 32'; Dilevski (yellow card) 52'; Venice (yellow card) 56'	Attendance: 1,000; Referee: Mohd. Zamzaidi Katimin (Melaka)

25 January	LionsXII (Singapore)	2–1	Selangor	Jalan Besar Stadium, Kallang, Singapore
19:45 UTC+08:00	Shakir (yellow card) 4' (goal) 44'; Safuwan (yellow card) 40'; Faritz (yellow card) 84'; Khairul 90+5' (yellow card) 90+6'		Kunanlan (yellow card) 30'; Fitri 58'	Attendance: 6,108

25 January	Sarawak	0–1	Kelantan	Sarawak Stadium, Kuching, Sarawak
20:45 UTC+08:00	Janjuš (yellow card) 14'		Forkey Doe (yellow card) 9' (goal) 90+1'; Fakri (yellow card) 20'; Nazri (yellow card) 37'	Attendance: 22,000

25 January	Perak	1–0	Terengganu	Perak Stadium, Ipoh, Perak
20:45 UTC+08:00	Eliel 90+3'		Farhan (yellow card) 44'; Zairo (yellow card) 61'; Bikana (yellow card) 74'	Attendance: 15,000; Referee: Muhd Nazmi Nasaruddin (Pulau Pinang)

25 January	T-Team (Terengganu)	1–0	Johor Darul Ta'zim	Sultan Ismail Nasiruddin Shah Stadium, Kuala Terengganu, Terengganu
20:45 UTC+08:00	Khairan (yellow card) 22'; Hasbullah (yellow card) 41'; Shahril (yellow card) 58'; Wanggai 72'		Fazly (yellow card) 52'; Aimar (yellow card) 74'	Attendance: 4,000; Referee: Wan Mohd Tarmizi Wan Ibrahim (Selangor)

25 January	Sime Darby (Kuala Lumpur)	1–0	Pahang	Majlis Perbandaran Selayang Stadium, Selayang, Selangor
20:45 UTC+08:00	Fahrul 50' (yellow card) 59'; Prabakaran (yellow card) 64'; Sharofetdinov (yellow card) 83'; Firdaus (yellow card) 85'; Mensah (yellow card) 90+4'		Azamuddin (yellow card) 50'; Conti (yellow card) 59'; Razman (yellow card) 90+4'	Attendance: 4,000

=== Week 3 ===
28 January	Selangor	1–0	Pahang	Petaling Jaya Stadium, Kelana Jaya, Selangor
16:45 UTC+08:00	Rangel 56'; Juninho (yellow card) 75'		Saiful Nizam (yellow card) 30'; Stewart (yellow card) 61'	Attendance: 5,000; Referee: Mohd. Zohri Tajuddin

28 January	Johor Darul Ta'zim	2–2	(Singapore) LionsXII	Tan Sri Dato Haji Hassan Yunos Stadium, Larkin, Johor
20:45 UTC+08:00	Figueroa 28'; Aimar 42'; Fazly (yellow card) 80'		Isa (yellow card) 9'; Afiq (yellow card) 41'; Khairul 67'; Hafiz Sujad 69'	Attendance: 25,000; Referee: Mohd. Amirul Izwan Yaakub

28 January	Terengganu	2–0	(Terengganu) T-Team	Sultan Ismail Nasiruddin Shah Stadium, Kuala Terengganu, Terengganu
20:45 UTC+08:00	Márcio 45+3'; Ashaari 59'			Attendance: 4,500; Referee: Syed Azhar Syed Kamar (Kuala Lumpur)

28 January	ATM	1–0	Perak	Majlis Perbandaran Selayang Stadium, Selayang, Selangor
20:45 UTC+08:00	Arostegui 19' (yellow card) 56'; Riduwan (yellow card) 59'; Affize (yellow card) 84' (red card); Amirizwan (yellow card) 90+3'		Hardi (yellow card) 14'; Nasir (yellow card) 78'; Zayar Win (yellow card) 84' (red card); Azmeer (yellow card) 90+3'	Attendance: 6,000; Referee: Samsudin Ibrahim (Terengganu)

28 January	Kelantan	1–2	(Selangor) PKNS	Sultan Muhammad IV Stadium, Kota Bharu, Kelantan
20:45 UTC+08:00	Fakri 30' (yellow card) 68'; Ghaddar (yellow card) 51'		Fauzan 40'; Aminuddin 42'; Ghani (yellow card) 50'; Nazmi (yellow card) 66'; Zulharis (yellow card) 90+7'	Attendance: 22,000; Referee: Nagor Amir Noor Mohamed (Johor)

28 January	Sarawak	3–0	(Kuala Lumpur) Sime Darby	Sarawak Stadium, Kuching, Sarawak
20:45 UTC+08:00	Joseph 12' (pen.); Janjuš 21'; Zamri (yellow card) 45'; Gyepes 45+5' (pen.)		Juzaili (yellow card) 11' (yellow card) 82' (red card); Farid (yellow card) 45+3'; Fahrul (yellow card) 45+4'; Prabakaran (yellow card) 65'	Attendance: 8,000; Referee: Mohd Zamzaidi Katimin (Melaka)

=== Week 4 ===
07 February	PKNS (Selangor)	0–2	Sarawak	Majlis Perbandaran Selayang Stadium, Selayang, Selangor
20:45 UTC+08:00	Alyy (yellow card) 20'; Nazmi (yellow card) 51'		Janjuš 9'; Gyepes 16'; Lot Hassan (yellow card) 54'; Rasyid (yellow card) 62'	Attendance: 2,500; Referee: Syed Azhar Syed Kamar (Kuala Lumpur)

07 February	Pahang	3–2	Johor Darul Ta'zim	Darul Makmur Stadium, Kuantan, Pahang
20:45 UTC+08:00	Razman (yellow card) 12'; Conti 13'; Fauzi 48'; Hafiz (yellow card) 61' (goal) 90+3'		Amri (yellow card) 3'; Nazrin (yellow card) 25'; Figueroa (yellow card) 35'; Aimar 45+2'; Safee 73'; Safiq (yellow card) 80'	Attendance: 35,000

08 February	LionsXII (Singapore)	0–0	Terengganu	Jalan Besar Stadium, Kallang, Singapore
19:45 UTC+08:00	Quak (yellow card) 40'		Barry (yellow card) 9'; Mazlizam (yellow card) 48'; Fakhrurazi (yellow card) 72'	Attendance: 6,000; Referee: Wan Mohd Tarmizi Wan Ibrahim (Selangor)

08 February	Perak	2–1	Kelantan	Perak Stadium, Ipoh, Perak
20:45 UTC+08:00	Sukri Hamid 13' (yellow card) 86'; Tuah (yellow card) 52'; Asyraf 78' (yellow card) 79'		Nazri (yellow card) 20'; Shawky 55'; Zaharulnizam (yellow card) 81'	Attendance: 18,000; Referee: Mohd. Zamzaidi Katimin (Melaka)

08 February	T-Team (Terengganu)	2–2	ATM	Sultan Ismail Nasiruddin Shah Stadium, Kuala Terengganu, Terengganu
20:45 UTC+08:00	Azlan 13'; Khairan (yellow card) 30' (goal) 90+1'; Syuhiran (yellow card) 86'		Norfazly 40'; Bruno 60'; Fitri Omar (yellow card) 63'; Hairuddin (yellow card) 90+2'	Attendance: 2,500; Referee: Nagor Amir Noor Mohamed (Johor)

08 February	Sime Darby (Kuala Lumpur)	1–2	Selangor	Majlis Perbandaran Selayang Stadium, Selayang, Selangor
20:45 UTC+08:00	Failee 2' (yellow card) 13'; Sharofetdinov (yellow card) 43'; Fairuz (yellow card) 72'		Rangel 40', 85'	Attendance: 6,000; Referee: Suhaizi Shukri (Melaka)

=== Week 5 ===
14 February	PKNS (Selangor)	0–0	(Kuala Lumpur) Sime Darby	Majlis Perbandaran Selayang Stadium, Selayang, Selangor
20:45 UTC+08:00			Syukur (yellow card) 65'; Nazrul (yellow card) 82'	Attendance: 800; Referee: Mohd Fairuzi Mat Desa

15 February	Johor Darul Ta'zim	4–1	Selangor	Tan Sri Dato Haji Hassan Yunos Stadium, Larkin, Johor
20:45 UTC+08:00	Baihakki 13' (yellow card) 45+2'; Hariss 34'; Nurul Azwan (yellow card) 52'; Figueroa 53'; Fadhli 60'		Kunanlan (yellow card) 65'; Rangel 77' (pen.); Shukur (yellow card) 80'; Bunyamin (yellow card) 90+1'	Attendance: 25,000; Referee: Muhd. Nazmi Nasaruddin (Pulau Pinang)

15 February	Terengganu	2–0	Pahang	Sultan Ismail Nasiruddin Shah Stadium, Kuala Terengganu, Terengganu
20:45 UTC+08:00	Karlović 21'; Márcio (yellow card) 65'; Ismail Faruqi 70' (yellow card) 77'		Rehman (yellow card) 44'; Nwakaeme (yellow card) 55'; Faizol (yellow card) 87'	Attendance: 8,000; Referee: Syed Azhar Syed Kamar (Kuala Lumpur)

15 February	ATM	1–2	(Singapore) LionsXII	Majlis Perbandaran Selayang Stadium, Selayang, Selangor
20:45 UTC+08:00	Amirizwan 4'		Khairul 47'; Zulfahmi (yellow card) 87'; Afiq 90+2'	Attendance: 4,000; Referee: Suhaizi Shukri (Melaka)

15 February	Kelantan	3–0	(Terengganu) T-Team	Sultan Muhammad IV Stadium, Kota Bharu, Kelantan
20:45 UTC+08:00	Obinna (yellow card) 13'; Shawky 32'; Badhri 45'; Ghaddar 84'; Faizol Nazlin (yellow card) 90+1'		Khairan (yellow card) 55'; Evaldo (yellow card) 59'; Faizal (yellow card) 87'	Attendance: 15,000; Referee: Mohd. Amirul Izwan Yaakub

15 February	Sarawak	1–0	Perak	Sarawak Stadium, Kuching, Sarawak
20:45 UTC+08:00	Janjuš 9'; Junior (yellow card) 34' (yellow card) 56' (red card); Mafry (yellow card) 44'; Joseph (yellow card) 47'; Gyepes (yellow card) 79'		Nasir (yellow card) 23'; Eliel (yellow card) 39'; Azmeer (yellow card) 45+1'; Asyraf (yellow card) 45+3'; Tuah (yellow card) 80'	Attendance: 17,500

=== Week 6 ===
08 March	LionsXII (Singapore)	1–2	Kelantan	Jalan Besar Stadium, Kallang, Singapore
19:45 UTC+08:00	Khairul 26'; Firdaus (yellow card) 66'		Fakri 51'; Faiz (yellow card) 86'; Forkey Doe 90+1'	Attendance: 7,187; Referee: Mohd. Zamzaidi Katimin (Melaka)

08 March	Pahang	4–1	ATM	Darul Makmur Stadium, Kuantan, Pahang
20:45 UTC+08:00	Conti 15'; Nwakaeme 18', 51'; Shahrizan (yellow card) 52'; Faizol 35' (yellow card) 59'; Hafiz (yellow card) 85'		Venice (yellow card) 7'; Norfazly (yellow card) 34'; Bruno (yellow card) 53'; Christie (yellow card) 59'; Arostegui 69'	Attendance: 20,000; Referee: Muhd. Nazmi Nasaruddin (Pulau Pinang)

08 March	Perak	1–1	(Selangor) PKNS	Perak Stadium, Ipoh, Perak
20:45 UTC+08:00	Eliel 6'; Fazli (yellow card) 69'; Nasir (yellow card) 78'		Nazmi (yellow card) 31'; Primorac 39'; Fauzan (yellow card) 45+1'; Shahrul (yellow card) 59'; P. Gunalan (yellow card) 90+4'	Attendance: 10,000; Referee: Suhaizi Shukri (Melaka)

08 March	T-Team (Terengganu)	2–0	Sarawak	Sultan Ismail Nasiruddin Shah Stadium, Kuala Terengganu, Terengganu
20:45 UTC+08:00	Hasbullah (yellow card) 22'; Syuhiran (yellow card) 45+2'; Ramzul 46' (yellow card) 76'; Badrul 85'		Joseph (yellow card) 61'; Chanturu (yellow card) 76'; Akmal Rizal (yellow card) 87'	Attendance: 2,000; Referee: Zulkifli Ahmad

08 March	Sime Darby (Kuala Lumpur)	0–2	Johor Darul Ta'zim	Majlis Perbandaran Selayang Stadium, Selayang, Selangor
20:45 UTC+08:00	Azmirul (yellow card) 18'; Sharofetdinov (yellow card) 36' (yellow card) 62' (red card); Fazrul (yellow card) 48'		Figueroa 25' (yellow card) 67'; Norshahrul 32' (yellow card) 38'; Nurul Azwan (yellow card) 73'	Attendance: 11,000; Referee: Wan Mohd Tarmizi Wan Ibrahim (Selangor)

04 May	Selangor	0–0	Terengganu	Shah Alam Stadium, Shah Alam, Selangor
20:45 UTC+08:00			Nordin (yellow card) 44'; Ismail Faruqi (yellow card) 45+2'	Attendance: 15,000; Referee: Syed Azhar Syed Kamar (Kuala Lumpur)

=== Week 7 ===
14 March	PKNS (Selangor)	3–1	(Terengganu) T-Team	Majlis Perbandaran Selayang Stadium, Selayang, Selangor
20:45 UTC+08:00	Shahrul 7'; Helmi 45+1'; Gunalan (yellow card) 52'; Kim (yellow card) 54'; Khairu 62'		Azrul (yellow card) 19'; Marzuki 29'; Ramzul (yellow card) 34'; Faizal (yellow card) 55'; Nuraliff (yellow card) 90+2'	Attendance: 500; Referee: Mohd Zohri Tajuddin

15 March	Terengganu	1–0	Johor Darul Ta'zim	Sultan Ismail Nasiruddin Shah Stadium, Kuala Terengganu, Terengganu
20:45 UTC+08:00	Bikana 17'; Márcio (yellow card) 85'; Fakhrurazi (yellow card) 90+2'		Shakir (yellow card) 44'	Attendance: 13,000; Referee: Nagor Amir Noor Mohamed (Johor)

15 March	ATM	1–1	Selangor	Majlis Perbandaran Selayang Stadium, Selayang, Selangor
20:45 UTC+08:00	Arostegui 45+1' (yellow card) 79'; Affize (yellow card) 45+2'; Venice (yellow card) 81'		Rangel 3' (yellow card) 45+2'; Gurusamy (yellow card) 67'; Veenod (yellow card) 80'	Attendance: 5,000; Referee: Muhd. Zamzaidi Katimin (Melaka)

15 March	Kelantan	2–2	Pahang	Sultan Muhammad IV Stadium, Kota Bharu, Kelantan
20:45 UTC+08:00	Badhri 2'; Khairul 80'		Saiful 13'; Faizol (yellow card) 58' (goal) 71'; Azamuddin (yellow card) 90+1'	Attendance: 13,000; Referee: Syed Azhar Syed Kamar (Kuala Lumpur)

15 March	Sarawak	3–1	(Singapore) LionsXII	Sarawak Stadium, Kuching, Sarawak
20:45 UTC+08:00	Chanturu 16', 40'; Rasyid (yellow card) 29' (goal) 76'; Lot Hassan (yellow card) 64'		Firdaus (yellow card) 17'; Nazrul 36'	Attendance: 17,500; Referee: Mohd. Nafeez Abdul Wahab (Johor)

15 March	Perak	0–2	(Kuala Lumpur) Sime Darby	Perak Stadium, Ipoh, Perak
20:45 UTC+08:00	Hardi (yellow card) 45+1'; Asyraf (yellow card) 50'; Zayar Win (yellow card) 63' (yellow card) 75' (red card)		Fairuz (yellow card) 33'; Fazrul 16', 41' (yellow card) 60'; Nazrul (yellow card) 75'	Attendance: 5,000; Referee: Wan Mohd Tarmizi Wan Ibrahim (Selangor)

=== Week 8 ===
22 March	LionsXII (Singapore)	2–1	(Selangor) PKNS	Jalan Besar Stadium, Kallang, Singapore
19:45 UTC+08:00	Zulfahmi 44'; Faris 60'; Sufian (yellow card) 61'; Madhu (yellow card) 90+1'		Nazmi 31'; Helmi (yellow card) 52'; Ghani (yellow card) 75'; Gunalan (yellow card) 78'	Attendance: 6,778; Referee: Samsudin Ibrahim (Terengganu)

22 March	Pahang	3–1	Sarawak	Darul Makmur Stadium, Kuantan, Pahang
20:45 UTC+08:00	Ronny 31' (o.g.); Shahrizan (yellow card) 42'; Stewart 61'; Hafiz 72'		Junior (yellow card) 71'; Rasyid 90+1'	Attendance: 20,000; Referee: Wan Mohd Tarmizi Wan Ibrahim (Selangor)

22 March	Selangor	1–0	Kelantan	Shah Alam Stadium, Shah Alam, Selangor
20:45 UTC+08:00	Rangel 22' (pen.) (yellow card) 60'; Fitri (yellow card) 90'		Tuan Faim (yellow card) 21'; Nik Shahrul (yellow card) 69'; Tengku Hasbullah (yellow card) 70'	Attendance: 17,000; Referee: Mohd. Nafeez Abdul Wahab (Johor)

22 March	Johor Darul Ta'zim	1–1	ATM	Tan Sri Dato Haji Hassan Yunos Stadium, Larkin, Johor
20:45 UTC+08:00	Mahali (yellow card) 45+2'; Baihakki (yellow card) 63'; Safee 86'		Riduwan 40' (yellow card) 58'; Christie (yellow card) 85'; Venice (yellow card) 90'; Rezal (yellow card) 90+3'	Attendance: 25,000; Referee: Syed Azhar Syed Kamar (Kuala Lumpur)

22 March	T-Team (Terengganu)	0–0	Perak	Sultan Ismail Nasiruddin Shah Stadium, Kuala Terengganu, Terengganu
20:45 UTC+08:00	Ramzul (yellow card) 69'; Wanggai (yellow card) 84'		Hisyamudin (yellow card) 43'; Sukri (yellow card) 67'; Mugenthirran (yellow card) 80'

22 March	Sime Darby (Kuala Lumpur)	3–2	Terengganu	Majlis Perbandaran Selayang Stadium, Selayang, Selangor
20:45 UTC+08:00	Nazrul 7'; Mensah (yellow card) 45' (yellow card) 66' (red card); Fazrul 45+2'; Farid 50' (pen.); Yosri (yellow card) 83'; Juzaili (yellow card) 87'		Ismail Faruqi 24'; Azlan (yellow card) 50'; Farhan 72'	Attendance: 3,500; Referee: Mohd. Fairuzi Mat Desa

=== Week 9 ===
25 March	ATM	0–3	Terengganu	Majlis Perbandaran Selayang Stadium, Selayang, Selangor
20:45 UTC+08:00	Fauzi Saari (yellow card) 32'		Manaf 24'; Nordin (yellow card) 28'; Ismail Faruqi (yellow card) 56'; Zubir (yellow card) 69'; Farhan 78'; Faiz 90+4'	Attendance: 1,000; Referee: Wan Mohd Tarmizi Wan Ibrahim (Selangor)

25 March	Kelantan	1–2	Johor Darul Ta'zim	Sultan Mohammad IV Stadium, Kota Bharu, Kelantan
20:45 UTC+08:00	Ghaddar 17'; Shawky (yellow card) 65'; Fakri (yellow card) 68'; Fitri (yellow card) 89'		Amri 33'; Fadhli (yellow card) 54'; Hariss (yellow card) 61'; Fazly 88'	Attendance: 22,000; Referee: Samsudin Ibrahim (Terengganu)

25 March	Sarawak	0–2	Selangor	Sarawak Stadium, Kuching, Sarawak
20:45 UTC+08:00	Gyepes (yellow card) 69'; Ramesh (yellow card) 83'		Andik 25'; Thamil (yellow card) 38' (goal) 52'; Rangel (yellow card) 90+1'	Attendance: 22,000; Referee: Mohd. Zohri Tajuddin

25 March	PKNS (Selangor)	1–3	Pahang	Shah Alam Stadium, Shah Alam, Selangor
20:45 UTC+08:00	Fauzan (yellow card) 48'; Patrick (yellow card) 51' (goal) 72'; Ghani (yellow card) 57'		Nwakaeme 43', 60'; Fauzi 63'	Attendance: 4,000; Referee: Suhaizi Shukri (Melaka)

25 March	Perak	0–1	(Singapore) LionsXII	Perak Stadium, Ipoh, Perak
20:45 UTC+08:00	Sukri (yellow card) 33'; Azmeer (yellow card) 60'; Nasir (yellow card) 89'		Hafiz Sujad (yellow card) 15'; Afiq (yellow card) 77'; Safuwan 90+4'	Attendance: 2,000; Referee: Muhd. Nazmi Nasaruddin (Pulau Pinang)

25 March	T-Team (Terengganu)	2–0	(Kuala Lumpur) Sime Darby	Sultan Ismail Nasiruddin Shah Stadium, Kuala Terengganu, Terengganu
20:45 UTC+08:00	Evaldo 26'; Marzuki 72'		Firdaus (yellow card) 17'	Attendance: 400; Referee: Mohd Fairuzi Mat Desa

=== Week 10 ===
29 March	LionsXII (Singapore)	1–1	(Terengganu) T-Team	Jalan Besar Stadium, Kallang, Singapore
19:45 UTC+08:00	Safuwan 24'; Shahfiq (yellow card) 27'; Zulfahmi (yellow card) 89'		Azrul (yellow card) 23'; Nelson 63'	Attendance: 7,268; Referee: Nagor Amir Noor Mohamed (Johor)

29 March	Pahang	2–0	Perak	Darul Makmur Stadium, Kuantan, Pahang
20:45 UTC+08:00	Nwakaeme 11' (yellow card) 58'; Conti (yellow card) 16'; Gopinathan 36'		Shahrizal (yellow card) 48'; Mugenthirran (yellow card) 53'	Attendance: 20,000; Referee: Kamal Khalid

29 March	Selangor	2–2	(Selangor) PKNS	Shah Alam Stadium, Shah Alam, Selangor
20:45 UTC+08:00	Veenod (yellow card) 14'; Helmi 21' (o.g.); Afiq 75'; Pantelidis (yellow card) 77'		Aminudddin 23', 73' (yellow card) 45'; Nazmi (yellow card) 45' (yellow card) 68' (red card); Patrick (yellow card) 90+2'

29 March	Johor Darul Ta'zim	1–1	Sarawak	Tan Sri Dato Haji Hassan Yunos Stadium, Larkin, Johor
20:45 UTC+08:00	Figueroa 29'; Fazly (yellow card) 67'		Chanturu 17'; Ronny (yellow card) 36'; Mafry (yellow card) 61'; Gyepes (yellow card) 86'; Sani (yellow card) 90+2'	Attendance: 30,000

29 March	Terengganu	3-0	Kelantan	Sultan Ismail Nasiruddin Shah Stadium, Kuala Terengganu, Terengganu
20:45 UTC+08:00	Ismail Faruqi (yellow card) 60'		Amar (yellow card) 59'; Brendan (yellow card) 77'; Shawky (yellow card) 90+3'	Attendance: 11,000; Referee: Syed Azhar Syed Kamar (Kuala Lumpur)

29 March	Sime Darby (Kuala Lumpur)	3–2	ATM	Majlis Perbandaran Selayang Stadium, Selayang, Selangor
20:45 UTC+08:00	Fahrul (yellow card) 11'; Arif 30'; Sharofetdinov (yellow card) 43' (yellow card) 89' (red card); Mensah 60'; Prabakaran (yellow card) 61'; Amnah 65'		Hairuddin (yellow card) 5'; Bruno 12' (pen.); Norfazly (yellow card) 40'; Arostegui 55'	Attendance: 1,500

=== Week 11 ===
04 April	PKNS (Selangor)	1–1	Johor Darul Ta'zim	Shah Alam Stadium, Shah Alam, Selangor
20:45 UTC+08:00	Patrick 37'; Gunalan (yellow card) 45+1' (yellow card) 86' (red card); Primorac (yellow card) 90'		Mahali 57'; Safee (yellow card) 69'; Amri (yellow card) 76'	Attendance: 4,000; Referee: Mohd Zohri Tajuddin

04 April	Sarawak	1–3	Terengganu	Sarawak Stadium, Kuching, Sarawak
20:45 UTC+08:00	Rasyid 30'		Zairo 21' (yellow card) 29'; Dabo 65'; Farhan 70'	Attendance: 15,000; Referee: Wan Mohd Tarmizi Wan Ibrahim (Selangor)

05 April	Kelantan	1–0	ATM	Sultan Mohammad IV Stadium, Kota Bharu, Kelantan
20:45 UTC+08:00	Shawky 60'; Farisham (yellow card) 84'		Arostegui (yellow card) 25'	Attendance: 7,000; Referee: Nagor Amir Noor Mohamed (Johor)

05 April	Perak	0–1	Selangor	Perak Stadium, Ipoh, Perak
20:45 UTC+08:00	Tuah (yellow card) 83'; Shahrizal (yellow card) 88' (red card)		Rangel 22' (pen.)	Attendance: 7,900; Referee: Syed Azhar Syed Kamar (Kuala Lumpur)

05 April	T-Team (Terengganu)	0–2	Pahang	Sultan Ismail Nasiruddin Shah Stadium, Kuala Terengganu, Terengganu
20:45 UTC+08:00	Sharin (yellow card) 11'; Faizal (yellow card) 58'; Nelson (yellow card) 68'		Nwakaeme (yellow card) 23'; Hafiz (yellow card) 34'; Conti 61'; Rehman 89'	Attendance: 3,000; Referee: Zulkifli Ahmad

05 April	Sime Darby (Kuala Lumpur)	0–2	(Singapore) LionsXII	Majlis Perbandaran Selayang Stadium, Selayang, Selangor
20:45 UTC+08:00	Yosri (yellow card) 83'		Safuwan 53' (yellow card) 54'; Raihan (yellow card) 59'; Khairul 62'; Aqhari (yellow card) 78'	Attendance: 1,000; Referee: Muhd. Zamzaidi Katimin (Melaka)

=== Week 12 ===
11 April	Johor Darul Ta'zim	1–0	(Selangor) PKNS	Tan Sri Dato Haji Hassan Yunos Stadium, Larkin, Johor
20:45 UTC+08:00	Aminuddin 3' (o.g.); Subramaniam (yellow card) 10'; Amri (yellow card) 70'		Aminuddin (yellow card) 16'; Hamka (yellow card) 63'; Alyy (yellow card) 74'	Attendance: 15,000

11 April	Terengganu	1–2	Sarawak	Sultan Ismail Nasiruddin Shah Stadium, Kuala Terengganu, Terengganu
20:45 UTC+08:00	Junior 38' (o.g.); Zubir (yellow card) 52'; Ismail Faruqi (yellow card) 67'		Chanturu 3'; Griffiths 75'; Fadzley (yellow card) 81'; Junior (yellow card) 90+4'	Attendance: 7,000; Referee: Mohd Zohri Tajuddin

12 April	LionsXII (Singapore)	0–1	(Kuala Lumpur) Sime Darby	Jalan Besar Stadium, Kallang, Singapore
19:45 UTC+08:00	Zulfahmi (yellow card) 62'; Madhu (yellow card) 67'; Faritz (yellow card) 90+3'		Juzaili (yellow card) 45+2'; Syukur 45+4'; Mateo (yellow card) 66'; Arif (yellow card) 74'; Firdaus (yellow card) 84'; Areff (yellow card) 90+4'	Attendance: 7,198; Referee: Mohd. Amirul Izwan Yaakob

12 April	Pahang	2–0	(Terengganu) T-Team	Darulmakmur Stadium, Kuantan, Pahang
20:45 UTC+08:00	Conti 3'; Azidan (yellow card) 45'; Azamuddin 57'; Faizol (yellow card) 75'			Attendance: 18,000; Referee: Mohd. Zamzaidi Katimin (Melaka)

12 April	Selangor	1–0	Perak	Shah Alam Stadium, Shah Alam, Selangor
20:45 UTC+08:00	Rangel 9'; Pantelidis (yellow card) 12'; Evaldo (yellow card) 45+1' (red card)		Syazwan (yellow card) 16'; Hassan (yellow card) 42'; Raffi (yellow card) 52' (yellow card) 66' (red card); Hardi (yellow card) 71'	Attendance: 10,000; Referee: Zulkifli Ahmad

12 April	ATM	0–2	Kelantan	Majlis Perbandaran Selayang Stadium, Selayang, Selangor
20:45 UTC+08:00	Riduwan (yellow card) 45+3'; Affize (yellow card) 90+3'		Badhri 45'; Fitri (yellow card) 46'; Forkey Doe 84'	Attendance: 7,000; Referee: Suhaizi Shukri (Melaka)

=== Week 13 ===
08 April	T-Team (Terengganu)	1–1	Selangor	Sultan Ismail Nasiruddin Shah Stadium, Kuala Terengganu, Terengganu
20:45 UTC+08:00	Wanggai 81' (yellow card) 93' (red card)		Thamil 15' (yellow card) 90+3'; Kunanlan (yellow card) 36'; Veenod (yellow card) 71'	Attendance: 1,000; Referee: Mohd Fairuzi Mat Desa

15 April	LionsXII (Singapore)	4–1	Pahang	Jalan Besar Stadium, Kallang, Singapore
19:45 UTC+08:00	Safuwan 30'; Faritz (yellow card) 65'; Sufian 80', 90+3', 90+6'		Stewart 8'; Hafiz (yellow card) 23'; Surendran (yellow card) 72'	Attendance: 6,248; Referee: Syed Azhar Syed Kamar (Kuala Lumpur)

15 April	Sarawak	3–2	ATM	Sarawak Stadium, Kuching, Sarawak
20:45 UTC+08:00	Junior 45'; Mazwandi (yellow card) 54'; Chanturu 63'; Shahrol 73'		Arostegui 35'; Safwan (yellow card) 71'; Christie 74'; Rezal (yellow card) 90'	Attendance: 18,000; Referee: Muhd. Zamzaidi Katimin (Melaka)

15 April	PKNS (Selangor)	2–2	Terengganu	Shah Alam Stadium, Shah Alam, Selangor
20:45 UTC+08:00	Khairu (yellow card) 59'; Patrick 63'; Gunalan 79'; Nazmi (yellow card) 79'		Azlan 23' (yellow card) 87'; Mario 44'; Sharbinee (yellow card) 69'	Attendance: 800; Referee: Mohd. Fairuzi Mat Desa

15 April	Perak	0–1	Johor Darul Ta'zim	Perak Stadium, Ipoh, Perak
20:45 UTC+08:00			Nazrin 16'; Amirul (yellow card) 29' (yellow card) 67' (red card); Shakir (yellow card) 32'; Asraruddin (yellow card) 45+2'	Attendance: 7,000; Referee: Samsudin Ibrahim (Terengganu)

15 April	Sime Darby (Kuala Lumpur)	4–0	Kelantan	Majlis Perbandaran Selayang Stadium, Selayang, Selangor
20:45 UTC+08:00	Mateo 5', 46', 69'; Amnah 66'		Nazri (yellow card) 42'; Nik Shahrul (yellow card) 62'; Khairul Fahmi (yellow card) 85'; Forkey Doe (yellow card) 86'	Attendance: 7,000; Referee: Suhaizi Shukri (Melaka)

=== Week 14 ===
18 April	Kelantan	0–1	Sarawak	Sultan Mohammad IV Stadium, Kota Bharu, Kelantan
20:45 UTC+08:00			Griffiths 52'; Ronny (yellow card) 85'; Junior (yellow card) 90+3'	Attendance: 6,000; Referee: Mohd. Zohri Tajuddin

18 April	Johor Darul Ta'zim	2–1	(Terengganu) T-Team	Tan Sri Dato Haji Hassan Yunos Stadium, Larkin, Johor
20:45 UTC+08:00	Figueroa 31', 90+2'; Hariss (yellow card) 42'; Subramaniam (yellow card) 76'		Dos Santos 24' (yellow card) 76'; Ramzul (yellow card) 55'	Attendance: 25,000; Referee: Wan Mohd Tarmizi Wan Ibrahim (Selangor)

19 April	Pahang	4–1	(Kuala Lumpur) Sime Darby	Darulmakmur Stadium, Kuantan, Pahang
20:45 UTC+08:00	Surendan 19'; Conti 36', 45+1'; Nwakaeme 66'		Prabakaran (yellow card) 11'; Firdaus (yellow card) 17'; Sharofetdinov 72'	Attendance: 18,000; Referee: Nagor Amir Noor Mohamed (Johor)

19 April	Selangor	1–0	(Singapore) LionsXII	Shah Alam Stadium, Shah Alam, Selangor
20:45 UTC+08:00	Pantelidis 24'; Rangel (yellow card) 90+1'		Raihan (yellow card) 44'; Zulfahmi (yellow card) 64'; Shakir (yellow card) 64'	Attendance: 12,000; Referee: Mohd. Nafeez Abdul Wahab (Johor)

19 April	Terengganu	0–2	Perak	Sultan Ismail Nasiruddin Shah Stadium, Kuala Terengganu, Terengganu
20:45 UTC+08:00	Azlan (yellow card) 90'		Nasir (yellow card) 17'; Partiban 29' (yellow card) 47'; Abdulafees (yellow card) 60'; Tulio 72' (yellow card) 90'; Razi (yellow card) 75'	Attendance: 3,000; Referee: Zulkifli Ahmad

19 April	ATM	4–1	(Selangor) PKNS	Majlis Perbandaran Selayang Stadium, Selayang, Selangor
20:45 UTC+08:00	Bruno 29' (pen.); Norfazly (yellow card) 31'; Arostegui (yellow card) 45+3'; Thinagaran 59'; Yusaini 77'; Affize (yellow card) 56' (goal) 90+2'		Patrick 23' (yellow card) 49'; Fauzan (yellow card) 52'; Shahurain (yellow card) 87'	Attendance: 1,000; Referee: Muhd. Nazmi Nasaruddin (Pulau Pinang)

=== Week 15 ===
09 May	Perak	2–1	ATM	Perak Stadium, Ipoh, Perak
20:45 UTC+08:00	Abdulafees 38', 85'; Azmeer (yellow card) 83'		Norfazly (yellow card) 67'; Arostegui 90+1'	Attendance: 7,000; Referee: Lis Mostia Mohen Mohd Tisan

09 May	T-Team (Terengganu)	1–1	Terengganu	Sultan Ismail Nasiruddin Shah Stadium, Kuala Terengganu, Terengganu
20:45 UTC+08:00	Faizal (yellow card) 35'; Marzuki (yellow card) 39'; Fazli (yellow card) 75'; Mulisa 77'		Farhan (yellow card) 14'; Zairo 36'; Dabo (yellow card) 43'; Mario (yellow card) 73'; Bikana (yellow card) 82'	Attendance: 1,500; Referee: Zulkifli Ahmad

10 May	Pahang	0–1	Selangor	Darulmakmur Stadium, Kuantan, Pahang
20:45 UTC+08:00	Razman (yellow card) 68'		Shahrom (yellow card) 17'; Andik 65'; Farizal (yellow card) 88'	Attendance: 32,000; Referee: Shamsudin Ibrahim (Terengganu)

10 May	PKNS (Selangor)	0–2	Kelantan	Shah Alam Stadium, Shah Alam, Selangor
20:45 UTC+08:00	Gunalan (yellow card) 62'; Kim (yellow card) 65'		Zaharulnizam (yellow card) 28' (goal) 44'; Nik Shahrul (yellow card) 36'; Zairul (yellow card) 63'; Forkey Doe 88'	Attendance: 8,500; Referee: Teo Hee Loon

10 May	Sime Darby (Kuala Lumpur)	3–2	Sarawak	Majlis Perbandaran Selayang Stadium, Selayang, Selangor
20:45 UTC+08:00	Sharofetdinov 30', 45+3' (yellow card) 90+3'; Juzaili (yellow card) 74'; Syukur 84'		Chanturu 8'; Griffiths 22'; Ramesh (yellow card) 34'; Lot Hassan (yellow card) 85'	Attendance: 5,000; Referee: Mohd Jeffri Zolkifli

20 May	LionsXII (Singapore)	2–3	Johor Darul Ta'zim	Jalan Besar Stadium, Kallang, Singapore
19:45 UTC+08:00	Faris 38'; Zulfahmi 41'; Madhu (yellow card) 51'; Afiq (yellow card) 54'		Díaz 43', 75'; Safee Sali (yellow card) 45+1'; Figueroa 54'; Fadhli (yellow card) 84'; Izham (yellow card) 90+2'	Attendance: 5,800; Referee: Muhd. Nazmi Nasaruddin (Pulau Pinang)

=== Week 16 ===
16 May	Sarawak	2–1	(Selangor) PKNS	Sarawak Stadium, Kuching, Sarawak
20:45 UTC+08:00	Rasyid (yellow card) 45+1'; Joseph 58' (yellow card) 80'; Salibašić 84'		Gunalan (yellow card) 41'; Ghani (yellow card) 65'; Fauzan 80'	Attendance: 17,000; Referee: Teoh Hee Loon

16 May	Johor Darul Ta'zim	2–2	Pahang	Tan Sri Dato Haji Hassan Yunos Stadium, Larkin, Johor
20:45 UTC+08:00	Figueroa 27'; Safiq 48'		Saiful (yellow card) 33'; Azamuddin 36'; Hafiz (yellow card) 50'; Rehman (yellow card) 67'; Conti (yellow card) 73'; Gopinathan 90'	Attendance: 20,000; Referee: Wan Mohd Tarmizi Wan Ibrahim (Selangor)

17 May	Selangor	1–0	(Kuala Lumpur) Sime Darby	Shah Alam Stadium, Shah Alam, Selangor
20:45 UTC+08:00	Rangel 38' (pen.) (yellow card) 84'		Yosri (yellow card) 37'; Sharofetdinov (yellow card) 74'; Fahrul (yellow card) 90+3'	Attendance: 9,000; Referee: Azman Jamaluddin

17 May	Terengganu	2–1	(Singapore) LionsXII	Sultan Ismail Nasiruddin Shah Stadium, Kuala Terengganu, Terengganu
20:45 UTC+08:00	Estupiñán 11'; Ismail Faruqi (yellow card) 40'; Zairo 69' (pen.); Zubir (yellow card) 89'		Khairul 8'; Raihan (yellow card) 36'; Izwan (yellow card) 68'	Attendance: 2,700; Referee: Muhd. Zamzaidi Katimin (Melaka)

17 May	Kelantan	2–1	Perak	Sultan Mohammad IV Stadium, Kota Bharu, Kelantan
20:45 UTC+08:00	Shawky 5'; Brendan (yellow card) 16'; Badhri (yellow card) 39'; Fitri (yellow card) 44'; Izuan 78'		Abdulafees (yellow card) 41'; Tuah (yellow card) 43'; Norhakim 80'	Attendance: 18,000; Referee: Zulkifli Ahmad

17 May	ATM	2–1	(Terengganu) T-Team	Majlis Perbandaran Selayang Stadium, Selayang, Selangor
20:45 UTC+08:00	Noël 21', 32'; Christie (yellow card) 73'; Venice (yellow card) 90+3'		Wanggai 13'; Mulisa (yellow card) 37'; Azlan (yellow card) 90+3'	Attendance: 500; Referee: Mohd. Nafeez Abdul Wahab (Johor)

=== Week 17 ===
23 May	Perak	4–1	Sarawak	Perak Stadium, Ipoh, Perak
20:45 UTC+08:00	Tulio 25', 66'; Purović 51' (yellow card) 79'; Idris (yellow card) 57'; Norhakim 59'; Hafiz (yellow card) 81'		Chanturu (yellow card) 31'; Junior (yellow card) 56'; Griffiths (yellow card) 60' (goal) 63'; Mafry (yel), 81'	Attendance: 7,000; Referee: Mohd. Nafeez Abdul Wahab (Johor)

24 May	LionsXII (Singapore)	2–1	ATM	Jalan Besar Stadium, Kallang, Singapore
19:45 UTC+08:00	Khairul 16'; Zulfahmi 21'; Safuwan (yellow card) 30'; Aqhari (yellow card) 90+3'		Bruno (yellow card) 40'; Rezal 77'; Park (yellow card) 79'	Attendance: 5,188; Referee: Lis Mostia Mohen Mohd Tisan

24 May	Pahang	1–4	Terengganu	Darulmakmur Stadium, Kuantan, Pahang
20:45 UTC+08:00	Razman (yellow card) 52' (yellow card) 78' (red card); Stewart 65'; Nwakaeme (yellow card) 90+1'		Estupiñán 17'; Manaf 45+1'; Zairo 90+2'; Ashaari 90+4'	Attendance: 15,000

24 May	T-Team (Terengganu)	1–0	Kelantan	Sultan Ismail Nasiruddin Shah Stadium, Kuala Terengganu, Terengganu
20:45 UTC+08:00	Dos Santos (yellow card) 45'; Nizad 49' (yellow card) 72'; Khairan (yellow card) 50'; Šubara (yellow card) 70'		Nazri (yellow card) 65'	Attendance: 2,000; Referee: Wan Mohd Tarmizi Wan Ibrahim (Selangor)

24 May	Sime Darby (Kuala Lumpur)	4–1	(Selangor) PKNS	Majlis Perbandaran Selayang Stadium, Selayang, Selangor
20:45 UTC+08:00	Fadzli 3' (yellow card) 35'; Syukur 22' (yellow card) 58'; Nazrul 24'; Fahrul 72'		Fauzan (yellow card) 50'; Shahrul 52'; Helmi (yellow card) 61'; Hamka (yellow card) 64'; Shahurain (yellow card) 81'	Attendance: 400; Referee: Mohd Jeffri Zolkifli

24 May	Selangor	0–1	Johor Darul Ta'zim	Shah Alam Stadium, Shah Alam, Selangor
20:45 UTC+08:00	Shahrom (yellow card) 16'; Pantelidis (yellow card) 27'		Shakir (yellow card) 5'; Daudsu (yellow card) 8'; Figueroa 71'; Marcos (yellow card) 90+4'	Attendance: 70,000; Referee: Shamsuddin Ibrahim (Terengganu)

=== Week 18 ===
10 June	Johor Darul Ta'zim	3–0	(Kuala Lumpur) Sime Darby	Tan Sri Dato Haji Hassan Yunos Stadium, Larkin, Johor
20:45 UTC+08:00	Amri 45' (yellow card) 79'; Díaz 52', 81'		Fazrul (yellow card) 86'	Attendance: 15,000; Referee: Nagor Amir Noor Mohamed (Johor)

10 June	Terengganu	1–4	Selangor	Sultan Ismail Nasiruddin Shah Stadium, Kuala Terengganu, Terengganu
20:45 UTC+08:00	Dabo 52'; Zairo (yellow card) 65'		Rangel 45+2' (red card) 45+4'; Hadi 48' (pen.); Andik (yellow card) 61'; Farizal (yellow card) 78'; Veenod 89'; Kunanlan 90+2'	Attendance: 11,000; Referee: Mohd. Nafeez Abdul Wahab (Johor)

10 June	ATM	2–2	Pahang	Majlis Perbandaran Selayang Stadium, Selayang, Selangor
20:45 UTC+08:00	Norfazly (yellow card) 53'; Arostegui 56'; Bruno 77'; Affize (yellow card) 88'		Fauzi 22' (o.g.); Saiful 69'; Stewart (yellow card) 82'	Attendance: 5,000; Referee: Suhaizi Shukri (Melaka)

10 June	Kelantan	2–1	(Singapore) LionsXII	Sultan Mohammad IV Stadium, Kota Bharu, Kelantan
20:45 UTC+08:00	Fakri (yellow card) 23' (goal) 30'; Farisham (yellow card) 52'; Izuan 60'; Forkey Doe (yellow card) 63'; Nazri (yellow card) 79'		Firdaus (yellow card) 23'; Raihan (yellow card) 38'; Faris 68'; Afiq (yellow card) 86'; Sufian (yellow card) 88'	Attendance: 6,000; Referee: Lis Mostia Mohen Mohd Tisan

10 June	Sarawak	2–0	(Terengganu) T-Team	Sarawak Stadium, Kuching, Sarawak
20:45 UTC+08:00	Salibašić 28'; Joseph (yellow card) 37' (goal) 55'; Dzulazlan (yellow card) 75'		Faizal (yellow card) 31'	Attendance: 17,000; Referee: Muhd. Zamzaidi Katimin (Melaka)

10 June	PKNS (Selangor)	1–3	Perak	Shah Alam Stadium, Shah Alam, Selangor
20:45 UTC+08:00	Khairu (yellow card) 9'; Arip 31'; Ghani (yellow card) 54' (yellow card) 74' (red card); Zulharis (yellow card) 85'; Hamka (yellow card) 86'		Norhakim 7'; Hassan 17'; Nasir (yellow card) 58'; Purović 63'	Attendance: 1,500

=== Week 19 ===
13 June	Johor Darul Ta'zim	4–3	Terengganu	Tan Sri Dato Haji Hassan Yunos Stadium, Larkin, Johor
20:45 UTC+08:00	Díaz 21', 37', 53'; Mahali 45'; Daudsu (yellow card) 90+3'		Dabo 4' (yellow card) 53'; Farhan 17'; Azlan (yellow card) 24'; Bikana 84'	Attendance: 18,000; Referee: Wan Mohd Tarmizi Wan Ibrahim (Selangor)

13 June	Selangor	0–2	ATM	Shah Alam Stadium, Shah Alam, Selangor
20:45 UTC+08:00	Hadi (yellow card) 13'; Veenod (yellow card) 56'		Arostegui 27' (pen.) 65'; Riduwan (yellow card) 42'; Fauzi (yellow card) 53'	Attendance: 9,000; Referee: Nagor Amir Noor Mohamed (Johor)

14 June	LionsXII (Singapore)	0–0	Sarawak	Jalan Besar Stadium, Kallang, Singapore
19:45 UTC+08:00	Faritz (yellow card) 39'; Faris (yellow card) 69'; Shakir (yellow card) 72'		Griffiths (yellow card) 30'; Junior (yellow card) 67'; Chanturu (yellow card) 81'; Joseph (yellow card) 90+2'	Attendance: 4,986

14 June	Pahang	1–0	Kelantan	Darulmakmur Stadium, Kuantan, Pahang
20:45 UTC+08:00	Conti 64'; Nwakaeme (yellow card) 71'; Saiful (yellow card) 87'		Fitri (yellow card) 90'	Attendance: 20,000; Referee: Muhd. Zamzaidi Katimin (Melaka)

24 May	T-Team (Terengganu)	2–0	(Selangor) PKNS	Sultan Ismail Nasiruddin Shah Stadium, Kuala Terengganu, Terengganu
20:45 UTC+08:00	Wanggai 45+1'; Šubara (yellow card) 55'; Fazli (yellow card) 78'; Nizad 86'		Shahrul (yellow card) 36'; Khairu (yellow card) 70'; Nazrin (yellow card) 73'	Attendance: 350; Referee: Mohd. Jeffri Zolkifli

13 June	Sime Darby (Kuala Lumpur)	4–0	Perak	Majlis Perbandaran Selayang Stadium, Selayang, Selangor
20:45 UTC+08:00	Yosri (yellow card) 32'; Sharofetdinov 43', 55'; Nazrul 78'; Shafiq 87'; Fahrul (yellow card) 90'			Attendance: 5,000; Referee: Zohri Tajuddin

=== Week 20 ===
17 June	Terengganu	2–2	(Kuala Lumpur) Sime Darby	Sultan Ismail Nasiruddin Shah Stadium, Kuala Terengganu, Terengganu
20:45 UTC+08:00	Mario 5'; Farhan 14'		Mensah 69'; Amnah 71'	Attendance: 1,800; Referee: Muhd. Zamzaidi Katimin (Melaka)

17 June	ATM	2–1	Johor Darul Ta'zim	Majlis Perbandaran Selayang Stadium, Selayang, Selangor
20:45 UTC+08:00	Bruno 39' (yellow card) 40'; Affize 59'; Azrul (yellow card) 75' (yellow card) 85' (red card)		Daudsu (yellow card) 71'; Aidil (yellow card) 78' (yellow card) 90' (red card); Asraruddin 84'; Díaz (yellow card) 90+4'	Attendance: 6,500

17 June	Kelantan	2–0	Selangor	Sultan Mohammad IV Stadium, Kota Bharu, Kelantan
20:45 UTC+08:00	Forkey Doe 22'; Zairul (yellow card) 63'; Hussein (yellow card) 82'; Zaharulnizam (yellow card) 70' (goal) 85'		Thamil (yellow card) 57'; Veenod (yellow card) 61'; Nazmi (yellow card) 84'	Attendance: 3,000; Referee: Syed Azhar Syed Kamar (Kuala Lumpur)

17 June	PKNS (Selangor)	2–1	(Singapore) LionsXII	Shah Alam Stadium, Shah Alam, Selangor
20:45 UTC+08:00	Shahurain (yellow card) 27'; Arip 31'; Remezey (yellow card) 45+2'; Patrick 46' (yellow card) 79'		Firdaus (yellow card) 19'; Quak 25'; Raihan (yellow card) 45'; Safuwan (yellow card) 65'; Faris (yellow card) 83'	Attendance: 300; Referee: Mohd. Zohri Tajuddin

17 June	Sarawak	1–1	Pahang	Sarawak Stadium, Kuching, Sarawak
20:45 UTC+08:00	Hairol (yellow card) 20'; Dzulazlan (yellow card) 43'; Salibašić (yellow card) 44'; Joseph 47'; Griffiths (yellow card) 66'		Conti 34'	Attendance: 15,000

17 June	Perak	1–1	(Terengganu) T-Team	Perak Stadium, Ipoh, Perak
20:45 UTC+08:00	Abdulafees 25'; Azmeer (yellow card) 54'		Mulisa 12'; Hasbullah (yellow card) 45+3'	Attendance: 4,000; Referee: Nagor Amir Noor Mohamed (Johor)

=== Week 21 ===
20 June	Terengganu	1–1	ATM	Sultan Ismail Nasiruddin Shah Stadium, Kuala Terengganu, Terengganu
20:45 UTC+08:00	Azlan (yellow card) 58'; Farhan 60'		Noël 64'	Attendance: 1,600; Referee: Nagor Amir Noor Mohamed (Johor)

20 June	Johor Darul Ta'zim	3–0	Kelantan	Tan Sri Dato Haji Hassan Yunos Stadium, Larkin, Johor
20:45 UTC+08:00	Amirul 26'; Safiq (yellow card) 33'; Nazrin 53'; Figueroa 88'		Shawky (yellow card) 67'; Tuan Faim (yellow card) 68'; Hussein (yellow card) 75'; Nazri (yellow card) 87'	Attendance: 25,000; Referee: Shamsuddin Ibrahim (Terengganu)

21 June	LionsXII (Singapore)	0–2	Perak	Jalan Besar Stadium, Kallang, Singapore
19:45 UTC+08:00	Madhu (yellow card) 4'; Isa (yellow card) 43'		Abdulafees 17'; Syazwan (yellow card) 44'; Purović 65'	Attendance: 4,262; Referee: Suhaizi Shukri (Melaka)

21 June	Pahang	2–1	(Selangor) PKNS	Darulmakmur Stadium, Kuantan, Pahang
20:45 UTC+08:00	Hafiz (yellow card) 45'; Azidan 47'; Saiful 53'		Gunalan (yellow card) 86'; Primorac 88'	Attendance: 8,000; Referee: Mohd. Nafeez Abdul Wahab (Johor)

21 June	Selangor	3–0	Sarawak	Shah Alam Stadium, Shah Alam, Selangor
20:45 UTC+08:00	Rangel 42', 61'; Pantelidis (yellow card) 45+2'; Hazwan 65'; Shukur (yellow card) 70'		Mazwandi (yellow card) 45+1'	Attendance: 8,000; Referee: Muhd. Zamzaidi Katimin (Melaka)

21 June	Sime Darby (Kuala Lumpur)	1–1	(Terengganu) T-Team	Majlis Perbandaran Selayang Stadium, Selayang, Selangor
20:45 UTC+08:00	Fadzli 22' (yellow card) 72'		Wanggai 8'; Fazli (yellow card) 71'; Dos Santos (yellow card) 74'	Attendance: 500; Referee: Mohd Amirul Izwan Yaakob

=== Week 22 ===
25 June	ATM	1–1	(Kuala Lumpur) Sime Darby	Majlis Perbandaran Selayang Stadium, Selayang, Selangor
20:45 UTC+08:00	Martelotto 33'		Amnah 50'

25 June	Kelantan	2–3	Terengganu	Sultan Mohammad IV Stadium, Kota Bharu, Kelantan
20:45 UTC+08:00	Fakri 4'; Izuan 27'; Tuan Faim (yellow card) 77'		Manaf (yellow card) 44' (goal) 74', 79'; Zairo (yellow card) 61'; Farhan 81'	Attendance: 3,000; Referee: Mohd. Jeffri Zolkifli

25 June	Sarawak	0–1	Johor Darul Ta'zim	Sarawak Stadium, Kuching, Sarawak
20:45 UTC+08:00	Ronny (yellow card) 69'; Shahrol (yellow card) 79'		Figueroa (yellow card) 41'; Shakir (yellow card) 59'; Díaz 66'; Amri (yellow card) 74'; Asraruddin (yellow card) 87'	Attendance: 18,000; Referee: Shamsuddin Ibrahim (Terengganu)

25 June	Perak	3–0	Pahang	Perak Stadium, Ipoh, Perak
20:45 UTC+08:00	Purović 21' (pen.) 24'; Abdulafees 68'		Rehman (yellow card) 43'	Attendance: 10,000; Referee: Zulkifli Ahmad

25 June	PKNS (Selangor)	2–2	Selangor	Shah Alam Stadium, Shah Alam, Selangor
20:45 UTC+08:00	Helmi (yellow card) 51'; Patrick 66'; Kim 82' (pen.)		Rangel 22', 68'; Kunanlan (yellow card) 35'; Shukur (yellow card) 81'	Attendance: 6,000; Referee: Muhd. Zamzaidi Katimin (Melaka)

25 June	T-Team (Terengganu)	0–1	(Singapore) LionsXII	Sultan Ismail Nasiruddin Shah Stadium, Kuala Terengganu, Terengganu
20:45 UTC+08:00	Shahril (red card) 55'; Wanggai (yellow card) 78'; Nik Zul (yellow card) 90+3'		Madhu (yellow card) 30'; Faris 66'; Raihan (yellow card) 67'; Sufian (yellow card) 78'	Attendance: 1,000; Referee: Mohd. Zohri Tajuddin

== Fixtures and results ==
Home \ Away	ATM	JDT	KEL	LNS	PHG	PRK	PKN	SWK	SEL	SDA	TTE	TRG
ATM		2–1	0–2	1–2	2–2	1–0	4–1	2–0	1–1	1–1	2–1	0–3
Johor DT	1–1		3–0	2–2	2–2	2–0	1–0	1–1	4–1	3–0	2–1	4–3
Kelantan	1–0	1–2		2–1	2–2	2–1	1–2	0–1	2–0	2–1	3–0	2–3
LionsXII	2–1	2–3	1–2		4–1	0–2	2–1	0–0	2–1	0–1	1–1	0–0
Pahang	4–1	3–2	1–0	1–0		2–0	2–1	3–1	0–1	4–1	2–0	1–4
Perak	2–1	0–1	2–1	0–1	3–0		1–1	4–1	0–1	0–2	1–1	1–0
PKNS	1–0	1–1	0–2	2–1	1–3	1–3		0–2	2–2	0–0	3–1	2–2
Sarawak	3–2	0–1	0–1	3–1	1–1	1–0	2–1		0–2	3–0	2–0	1–3
Selangor	0–2	0–1	1–0	1–0	1–0	1–0	2–2	3–0		1–0	2–0	0–0
Sime Darby	3–2	0–2	4–0	0–2	1–0	4–0	4–1	3–2	1–2		1–1	3–2
T–Team	2–2	1–0	1–0	0–1	0–2	3–0 (Note: Original score: 1-1)	2–0	2–0	1–1	2–0		1–1
Terengganu	1–1	1–0	3–0 (Note: Original score: 1-1)	2–1	2–0	0–2	2–1	1–2	1–4	2–2	2–0	

Updated to match(es) played on 25 June 2014. Source: Liga Super 1, Liga Super 2
Legend: Blue = home team win; Yellow = draw; Red = away team win.

== Season statistics ==
=== Top scorers ===
As of 25 June 2014

Rank	Player	Club	Goals
1	(Brazil) Paulo Rangel	Selangor	16
2	(Argentina) Luciano Figueroa	Johor Darul Ta'zim	11
3	(Argentina) Juan Arostegui	ATM	9
3	(Argentina) Matías Conti	Pahang	9
5	(Argentina) Jorge Pereyra Díaz	Johor Darul Ta'zim	8
6	(Singapore) Khairul Amri	LionsXII	7
6	(Liberia) Patrick Wleh	PKNS	7
6	(Malaysia) Nor Farhan Muhammad	Terengganu	7
9	(Argentina) Bruno Martelotto	ATM	6
9	(Nigeria) Dickson Nwakaeme	Pahang	6
9	(Malaysia) S. Chanturu	Sarawak	6
12	(Liberia) Francis Doe	Kelantan	5
12	(Nigeria) Abdulafees Abdulsalam	Perak	5
12	(Montenegro) Milan Purović	Perak	5
12	(Uzbekistan) Dilshod Sharofetdinov	Sime Darby	5
12	(Indonesia) Patrich Wanggai	T-Team	5

=== Own goals ===
Rank	Player	For	Club	Own Goal
1	(Malaysia) Ronny Harun	Pahang	Sarawak	1
1	(Malaysia) Helmi Remeli	Selangor	PKNS	1
1	(Malaysia) Aminuddin Noor	Johor Darul Ta'zim	PKNS	1
1	(Malaysia) Junior Eldstål	Terengganu	Sarawak	1
1	(Malaysia) Norfazly Alias	Sarawak	ATM	1

=== Hat-tricks ===
Player	Club	Against	Result	Date
(Croatia) Mateo Roskam	Sime Darby	Kelantan	4–0	15 April 2014
(Singapore) Sufian Anuar	LionsXII	Pahang	4–1	15 April 2014
(Argentina) Jorge Pereyra Díaz	Johor Darul Ta'zim	Terengganu	4–3	13 June 2014

=== Clean sheets ===
As of 25 June 2014

Rank	Player	Club	Clean sheets
1	(Malaysia) Farizal Marlias	Selangor	6
2	(Malaysia) Sharbinee Allawee	Terengganu	5
2	(Malaysia) Mohd Izham Tarmizi	Johor Darul Ta'zim	5
3	(Malaysia) Khairul Fahmi Che Mat	Kelantan	4
3	(Singapore) Izwan Mahbud	LionsXII	4
4	(Malaysia) Shahril Saa'ri	T-Team	3
4	(Malaysia) Khairul Azhan	Pahang	3
4	(Malaysia) Suffian Abdul Rahman	Sime Darby	3
5	(Malaysia) Syed Adney	ATM	2
5	(Malaysia) Remezey Che Ros	PKNS	2
5	(Malaysia) Sani Anuar	Sarawak	2
5	(Malaysia) Muhammad Al-Hafiz Hamzah	Johor Darul Ta'zim	2

=== Scoring ===
- First goal of the season: Matías Conti for Pahang against LionsXII (17 January 2014)
- Fastest goal of the season: 2 minutes – Mohd Failee Mohamad Ghazli for Sime Darby against Selangor (8 February 2014)
- Largest winning margin: 4–0 wins by Sime Darby against Kelantan (15 April 2014)
- Highest scoring game: 7 goals
  - Johor Darul Ta'zim 4–3 Terengganu (13 June 2014)
- Most goals scored in a match by a single team: 4 goals
  - Sime Darby 4–0 Kelantan (15 April 2014)
  - Sime Darby 4–0 Perak (14 June 2014)
- Most goals scored in a match by a losing team: 3 goals Terengganu in a 4–3 loss against Johor Darul Ta'zim in Tan Sri Dato Haji Hassan Yunos Stadium (13 June 2014)

== Awards ==
=== Monthly awards ===
Month	Coach of the Month		Player of the Month		Reference
Month	Coach	Club	Player	Club	Reference
January	(Australia) Mehmet Durakovic	Selangor	(Brazil) Paulo Rangel	Selangor	
February	(Malaysia) Abdul Rahman	Terengganu	(Malaysia) Badhri Radzi	Kelantan	
March	(Malaysia) Zainal Abidin Hassan	Pahang	(Malaysia) Zairo Anuar	Terengganu	
April	(Malaysia) Ismail Zakaria	Sime Darby	(Argentina) Luciano Figueroa	Johor Darul Ta'zim	
May	(Croatia) Bojan Hodak	Johor Darul Ta'zim	(Argentina) Jorge Pereyra Díaz	Johor Darul Ta'zim	

== Transfers ==
For transfers see: List of Malaysian football transfer 2014

== Attendances ==
Pos	Team	Total	High	Low	Average	Change
1	Johor Darul Ta'zim	253,000	30,000	15,000	23,000	+7.0%
2	Pahang	237,000	34,000	8,000	21,545	+7.7%
3	Sarawak	185,000	22,000	8,000	16,818	+12.1%
4	Selangor	164,000	80,000	4,000	14,909	+10.4%
5	Kelantan	140,000	25,000	3,000	12,727	−15.2%
6	Perak	92,900	18,000	2,000	8,445	−6.2%
7	Terengganu	75,200	13,000	1,300	6,836	−2.3%
8	LionsXII	67,023	7,268	4,262	6,093	−3.3%
9	Sime Darby	44,900	11,000	400	4,082	+36.1%
10	ATM	42,000	6,500	500	3,818	−4.5%
11	PKNS	29,900	8,500	300	2,718	+43.1%
12	T–Team	18,050	4,000	300	1,641	+21.6%
	League total	1,348,973	80,000	300	10,219	+13.5%

Updated to games played on 30 June 2014

== See also ==
- 2014 Liga Premier
- 2014 Liga FAM
- 2014 Piala FA
