= 2014 Kelantan FA season =

Kelantan
2014 season
- President: Annuar Musa
- Head coach: Steve Darby (until 15 April 2015); George Boateng (starting 25 April 2015)
- Stadium: Sultan Muhammad IV Stadium (Capacity: 22,000)
- Super League: 6th
- FA Cup: Semi-final
- Malaysia Cup: Quarter-final
- AFC Cup: Group stage
- Top goalscorer: League: Francis Forkey Doe (5); Mohamed Shawky (5); All: Francis Forkey Doe (13)
Home colours	Away colours

The 2014 season was Kelantan FA's 6th season in the Malaysia Super League and 19th successive season in the top flight of Malaysian football league system.

The campaign featured Kelantan's 3rd consecutive appearance in the AFC Cup because they were the 2013 Malaysia FA Cup's winner.

== Competitions ==
Win Draw Loss Postponed

=== Pre-season and friendlies ===
Date	Opponents	H / A	Result F–A	Scorers	Attendance
5 December 2013	(Malaysia) (Penang) PBAPP FC	A	1–1	Shakir Ali	
7 December 2013	(Malaysia) Penang FA	A	0–2		
10 December 2013	(Malaysia) Perak FA	A	1–4	Shakir Ali 35'	
13 December 2013	(Malaysia) Kedah FA	A	0–3		
18 December 2013	(Malaysia) Terengganu FA	A	Cancelled		
4 January 2014	(Malaysia) Kelantan FA's President Cup Squad	H	2–1	Mohamed Shawky 10', Tengku Hasbullah 47'	
6 January 2014	(Malaysia) Perlis FA	H	3–1	Ghaddar, Fakri, Wan Zaharulnizam	
11 January 2014	(Thailand) Phattalung F.C.	H	4–0	Ghaddar 8', 27', 43', Fakri 21'	
31 January 2014	Brunei DPMM FC	A	0–0		
13 July 2014	Johor Darul Ta'zim F.C.	H	1–1	Mohamed Moustapha N'diaye 62' (Special Invitation)	
2 August 2014	Terengganu FA	H	2–1	Ahmad Shakir Mohd Ali 17', Mohd Fitri Omar 71'	
31 January 2014	Kedah FA	H	2–4	Mohd Khairul Izuan Rosli 53', Rozaimi Azwar 80'	

=== Super League ===
Date	Opponents	H / A	Result F–A	Scorers	Attendance	League position	Notes
18 January 2014	(Malaysia) (Kuala Lumpur) Sime Darby	H	2–1	Ghaddar 60', 81' p	25,000	4th	
25 January 2014	(Malaysia) Sarawak	A	1–0	Forkey Doe 90'	15,000	▲1st	
28 January 2014	(Malaysia) (Selangor) PKNS	H	1–2	Fakri 30'	25,000	▼4th	
9 February 2014	(Malaysia) Perak	A	1–2	Shawky 55'	18,000	▼6th	
15 February 2014	(Malaysia) (Terengganu) T-Team	H	3–0	Shawky 32', Piya 45', Ghaddar 83'	15,000	▲2nd	
8 March 2014	(Singapore) Lions XII	A	2–1	Fakri 51', Forkey Doe 90+1'	7,187	▲1st	
15 March 2014	(Malaysia) Pahang	H	2–2	Piya 1', Izuan Rosli 80'	13,000	▼2nd	
22 March 2014	(Malaysia) Selangor	A	0–1		17,000	▼3rd	Forkey Doe missed a penalty kick. First match Kelantan failed to score any goal in this year's campaign.
25 March 2014	(Malaysia) (Johor) JDT	H	1–2	Ghaddar 17'	22,000	▼6th	
29 March 2014	(Malaysia) Terengganu	A	1–1 (0–3)	Shawky 17'	11,000	6th	Terengganu was rewarded a 3 nil win after a Kelantan's player played with three previous yellow cards. However, this punishment does not change Kelantan's position in league.
5 April 2014	(Malaysia) (Kuala Lumpur) ATM	H	1–0	Shawky 60'	7,000	▲5th	Shawky saved Steve Darby's reputation as Kelantan FA's coach
12 April 2014	(Malaysia) (Kuala Lumpur) ATM	A	2–0	Piya 44', Forkey Doe 83'	7,000	▲4th	
15 April 2014	(Malaysia) (Kuala Lumpur) Sime Darby	A	0–4		7,000	▼6th	Steve Darby's contract with Kelantan ended immediately by TSAM after this humiliating lost. Mohd Hashim Mustapha and Zahasmi Ismail will take over Steve Darby's role while waiting for new head coach to arrive.
18 April 2014	(Malaysia) Sarawak	H	0–1		6,000	▼7th	First match under Mohd Hashim Mustapha's coaching ended with a defeat.
10 May 2014	(Malaysia) (Selangor) PKNS	A	2–0	Kechik 44', Forkey Doe 88'	8,500	▲6th	First win under George Boateng's coaching. First win after four matches.
17 May 2014	(Malaysia) Perak	H	2–1	Shawky 5', Izuan Rosli 77'	18,000	6th	
24 May 2014	(Malaysia) (Terengganu) T-Team	A	0–1		2,000	6th	
10 June 2014	(Singapore) Lions XII	H	2–1	Fakri 29', Izuan Rosli 58'	6,000	▲5th	Match debut for Prince Tagoe but he only played for 10 minutes.
14 June 2014	(Malaysia) Pahang	A	0–1		20,000	▼7th	
17 June 2014	(Malaysia) Selangor	H	2–0	Forkey Doe 22', Kechik 85'	3,000	▲5th	
21 June 2014	(Malaysia) (Johor) JDT	A	0–3		25,000	5th	
25 June 2014	(Malaysia) Terengganu	H	2–3	Fakri 29', Izuan Rosli 58'	3,000	▼6th	

Goal scores for Super League

As of 25 June 2014

5 goals

- (Liberia) Francis Forkey Doe
- (Egypt) Mohamed Shawky

4 goals

- (Malaysia) Ahmad Fakri Saarani
- (Lebanon) Mohammed Ghaddar
- (Malaysia) Mohd Khairul Izuan Rosli

3 goals

- (Malaysia) Mohd Badhri Mohd Radzi

2 goals

- (Malaysia) Wan Zaharulnizam Zakaria

=== FA Cup ===
Having finished as the champion of the last two consecutive seasons, Kelantan will begin their FA Cup campaign in the second round, having given a bye in the first round. The draw for the FA Cup's first and subsequent rounds was held on 29 November 2013 at Grand BlueWave Hotel, Shah Alam, Selangor. Kelantan will play against the winner of the first round match between Pahang Kuantan FA and Sabah.

Date	Opponents	H / A	Result F–A	Scorers	Attendance	Notes
4 February 2014	(Malaysia) Sabah	H	2–1	Shawky 44', Shakir Ali 86'		
11 February 2014	(Malaysia) (Selangor) PKNS	H	3–2	Piya 2', Hasbullah 42', Shakir Ali 83'		
18 February 2014	(Malaysia) (Selangor) PKNS	A	3–3	Fakri 10', Shakir Ali 26', Gaddar 72'		
6 May 2014	(Malaysia) (Kuala Lumpur) Felda United	H	3–3	Forkey Doe 40', Fakri 42', Kechik 51'		
31 May 2014	(Malaysia) (Kuala Lumpur) Felda United	A	2–2	Izuan Rosli 28', Forkey Doe 35',		This draw marks the end of Kelantan's campaign in FA Cup after losing to goal advantage.

=== Malaysia Cup ===
The draw for the 2014 Malaysia Cup was held on 13 July 2014 at the Dewan Perdana, National Sports Institute and Kelantan FA was drawn into a tough group containing JDT, their opponent from last season semi final ATM and Pulau Pinang.

== Malaysia Cup ==
=== Group stage ===
Date	Opponents	H / A	Result F–A	Scorers	Attendance	Referee	Group ranking
13 August 2014	(Malaysia) (Johor) JDT	A	0–1				4th
19 August 2014	(Malaysia) Penang FA	H	3–1	Fakri 9', Forkey Doe 22' p, Fakri 87'			▲2nd
23 August 2014	(Malaysia) ATM	A	3–0	Forkey Doe 51', Piya 60', 88'			2nd
26 August 2014	(Malaysia) ATM	H	1–2	Forkey Doe 42'			2nd
29 August 2014	(Malaysia) Penang FA	A	3–1	Kechik 35', Izuan Rosli 61', Forkey Doe 83'			2nd
3 September 2014	(Malaysia) (Johor) JDT	H	0–3				2nd

=== Quarter-finals ===
Date	Opponents	H / A	Result F–A	Scorers	Attendance	Referee
3 October 2014	(Malaysia) Kedah	H	3–1	Forkey Doe 7', 24', Fakri 61'		
10 October 2014	(Malaysia) Kedah	A	0–3			

=== AFC Cup ===
The draw for the group stage was held on 10 December 2013 at AFC House, Kuala Lumpur. Kelantan, eligible as the winner of 2013 Malaysia FA Cup, was grouped in Group G and will start the campaign against Yangon United away from home on 26 February 2014.

Date	Opponents	H / A	Result F–A	Scorers	Attendance	Group ranking	Notes
26 February 2014	(Myanmar) Yangon United	A	3–5	Kechik 47', Piya 63', 90+4'	2,000	4th	Kelantan played with 10 players after Shakir Ali was given red card.
12 March 2014	(Hong Kong) South China	H	2–0	Kechik 72', Ghaddar 83'	4,564	▲3rd	
18 March 2014	(Vietnam) Vissai Ninh Bình	H	2–3	Nazri 36', Izuan Rosli 45'	1,500	3rd	Kelantan played with 9 players after both Izuan Rosli and Shakir Ali were given red card. Third red card for Shakir Ali in this season.
2 April 2014	(Vietnam) Vissai Ninh Bình	A	0–4		4,000	3rd	Biggest loss in this year's campaign. Yet. Fan club TRWKB demands Steve Darby to resign after this match.
8 April 2014	(Myanmar) Yangon United	H	2–3	Izuan Rosli 48', Kechik 54'	1,505	▼4th	The opportunity for Kelantan to march to group of 16 stage was shattered after this loss against Yangon United.
22 April 2014	(Hong Kong) South China	A	0–4		1,798	4th	Kelantan failed to score after three conservative matches. Worst AFC Cup's result in history for Kelantan.

== Player statistics ==
=== Squad ===
Last updated 11 May 2014 ^{MSLGW1, MSLGW2, MSLGW3}

Key: = Appearances, = Goals, = Yellow card, (red card) = Red card (Player names in italics denotes player that left mid-season)

Number	Nation	Position	Name	Total				League				AFC Cup				FA Cup				Malaysia Cup			
Number	Nation	Position	Name		Goal	Booked	Sent off (straight red)		Goal	Booked	Sent off (straight red)		Goal	Booked	Sent off (straight red)		Goal	Booked	Sent off (straight red)		Goal	Booked	Sent off (straight red)
30	(Malaysia) (Kelantan)	GK	Mohd Shahrizan Ismail	0	0	0	0	0	0	0	0	0	0	0	0	0	0	0	0	1	0	0	0
5	(Malaysia) (Kelantan)	DF	Nik Shahrul Azim Abdul Halim	3	0	0	0	3	0	0	0	4	0	1	0	0	0	0	0	6	0	3	1
6	(Malaysia) (Kelantan)	DF	Mohd Farisham Ismail	3	0	0	0	3	0	0	0	4(1)	0	1	0	0	0	0	0	5	0	0	0
13	(Malaysia) (Kelantan)	MF	Ahmad Fakri Saarani	3	1	2	0	3	1	2	0	2	0	0	0	0	0	0	0	5	2	2	0
11	(Malaysia) (Kelantan)	DF	Mohammad Abdul Aziz Ismail	0	0	0	0	0	0	0	0	0(2)	0	0	0	0	0	0	0	1	0	0	0
16	(Malaysia) (Kelantan)	MF	Mohd Badhri Mohd Radzi	3	0	0	0	3	0	0	0	3(2)	2	0	0	0	0	0	0	4(2)	2	0	0
23	(Malaysia) (Kelantan)	MF	Mohd Khairul Izuan Rosli	0(1)	0	0	0	0(1)	0	0	0	2(1)	2	0	1	0	0	0	0	2(2)	1	0	0
19	(Malaysia) (Kelantan)	GK	Khairul Fahmi Che Mat	3	0	0	0	3	0	0	0	4	0	0	0	0	0	0	0	5	0	0	0
24	(Malaysia) (Kelantan)	DF	Zairul Fitree Ishak	2(1)	0	0	0	2(1)	0	0	0	4(1)	0	0	0	4(1)	0	3	0	4(1)	0	3	0
21	(Malaysia) (Kedah)	FW	Ahmad Shakir Mohd Ali	0(2)	0	0	0	0(2)	0	0	0	2	0	0	1	0(3)	0	0	0	0(3)	0	0	0
25	(Malaysia) (Kelantan)	DF	Faizol Nazlin Sayuti	0	0	0	0	0	0	0	0	1(3)	0	0	0	0	0	0	0	0	0	0	0
3	(Malaysia) (Kelantan)	DF	Mohamad Faiz Suhaimi	0	0	0	0	0	0	0	0	1(3)	0	1	0	0	0	0	0	0	0	0	0
8	(Malaysia) (Kelantan)	MF	Wan Zaharulnizam Zakaria	2(1)	0	0	0	2(1)	0	0	0	6	3	0	0	3(2)	1	1	0	3(2)	1	1	0
10	(Liberia)	FW	Francis Forkey Doe	3	1	1	0	3	1	1	0	4	0	0	0	0	0	0	0	6	4	1	0
17	(Egypt)	MF	Mohamed Shawky	1	0	0	0	1	0	0	0	1(2)	0	2	0	0	0	0	0	1(3)	0	0	0
1	(Malaysia) (Kelantan)	GK	Muhammad Syazwan Yusoff	0	0	0	0	0	0	0	0	2	0	0	0	0	0	0	0	0	0	0	0
12	(Malaysia) (Kedah)	MF	Amar Rohidan	1	0	1	0	1	0	1	0	4(1)	0	0	0	0	0	0	0	5(1)	0	1	0
7	(Malaysia) (Kelantan)	MF	Tengku Hasbullah Raja Hassan	3	0	0	0	3	0	0	0	6	0	0	0	0	0	0	0	0	0	0	0
18	(Malaysia) (Selangor)	DF	Muhd Nazri Ahmad	1	0	1	0	1	0	1	0	5	1	0	0	0	0	0	0	3(2)	0	2	0
15	(Malaysia) (Kelantan)	FW	Famirul Asyraf Sayuti	0	0	0	0	0	0	0	0	0	0	0	0	0	0	0	0	1	0	0	0
2	(Malaysia) (Kelantan)	DF	Tuan Muhammad Faim Tuan Zainal Abidin	0	0	0	0	0	0	0	0	3(1)	0	0	0	0	0	0	0	0	0	0	0
14	(Malaysia) (Kelantan)	DF	Lim Choon Wee	0	0	0	0	0	0	0	0	0	0	0	0	0	0	0	0	0	0	0	0
20	(Malaysia) (Kelantan)	DF	Muhammad Aizat Jaini	0	0	0	0	0	0	0	0	0	0	0	0	0	0	0	0	0	0	0	0
26	(Iraq)	DF	Hussein Alaa Hussein	0	0	0	0	0	0	0	0	0	0	0	0	0	0	0	0	4	0	1	0
28	(Ghana)	FW	Prince Tagoe	0	0	0	0	0	0	0	0	0	0	0	0	0	0	0	0	0	0	0	0
45	(Malaysia) (Selangor)	MF	Mohd Fitri Omar	0	0	0	0	0	0	0	0	0	0	0	0	0	0	0	0	5	0	2	0
43	(Malaysia) (Australia)	MF	Brendan Gan	0	0	0	0	0	0	0	0	0	0	0	0	0	0	0	0	5(1)	0	2	0
22	(Lebanon)	FW	Mohammed Ghaddar	2(1)	2	1	0	2(1)	2	1	0	2(1)	1	1	0	0	0	0	0	0	0	0	0
4	(Nigeria)	DF	Obinna Nwaneri	3	0	0	0	3	0	0	0	6	0	0	0	0	0	0	0	0	0	0	0

=== Goalscorers ===
As of 3 October 2014

13 goals

- (Liberia) Francis Forkey Doe

9 goals

- (Malaysia) Ahmad Fakri Saarani

8 goals

- (Malaysia) Mohd Badhri Mohd Radzi
- (Malaysia) Mohd Khairul Izuan Rosli

7 goals

- (Malaysia) Wan Zaharulnizam Zakaria

6 goals

- (Egypt) Mohamed Shawky
- (Lebanon) Mohammed Ghaddar

3 goals

- (Malaysia) Ahmad Shakir Mohd Ali

1 goal

- (Malaysia) Muhd Nazri Ahmad
- (Malaysia) Tengku Hasbullah Raja Hassan

== Transfers ==
=== Players in ===
Dates	Player	From	Fee
5 November 2013	(Malaysia) (Kelantan) Faizol Nazlin Sayuti	(Malaysia) Kelantan President's Cup	N/A
5 November 2013	(Malaysia) (Kelantan) Mohamad Faiz Suhaimi	(Malaysia) Kelantan President's Cup	N/A
November 2013	(Lebanon) Mohammed Ghaddar	Free agent	Free
November 2013	(Egypt) Mohamed Shawky	(Iraq) Al-Naft	Free
November 2013	(Malaysia) (Kelantan) Wan Zaharulnizam Zakaria	(Malaysia) Harimau Muda A	Free
November 2013	(Malaysia) (Kedah) Mohd Amar Rohidan	(Malaysia) (Kuala Lumpur) Felda United	Free
November 2013	(Malaysia) (Selangor) Muhd Nazri Ahmad	(Malaysia) Johor Darul Takzim	Free
November 2013	(Malaysia) (Kelantan) Tengku Hasbullah Raja Hassan	(Malaysia) Kedah	Free
November 2013	(Liberia) Francis Doe	(Malaysia) Selangor	Free
November 2013	(Malaysia) (Kelantan) Famirul Asyraf Sayuti	(Malaysia) (Kuala Lumpur) Sime Darby	Free
December 2013	(Malaysia) (Negeri Sembilan) Ahmad Shakir Mohd Ali	(Malaysia) Negeri Sembilan	Free
March 2014	(Malaysia) (Australia) Brendan Gan	(Australia) Rockdale City Suns	
March 2014	(Malaysia) (Selangor) Mohd Fitri Omar	(Malaysia) (Kuala Lumpur) ATM	
April 2014	(Malaysia) (Pahang) Wan Zack Haikal	(Japan) FC Ryūkyū	
April 2014	(Iraq) Hussein Alaa Hussein	(Thailand) Bangkok United	
May 2014	(Ghana) Prince Tagoe	(Tunisia) Club Africain	

Total spent: RM 0 million

=== Players out ===
Dates	Player	To	Fee
30 June 2013	(Croatia) Lek Kćira	(Croatia) HNK Gorica	Free
30 June 2013	(Australia) Dimitri Petratos	(Australia) Brisbane Roar	Free
September 2013	(Malaysia) Mohd Zamri Ramli	Suspension	
November 2013	(Malaysia) Muhammad Qayyum Marjono Sabil	(Malaysia) Harimau Muda B	Free
November 2013	(Malaysia) Indra Putra Mahayuddin	(Malaysia) (Kuala Lumpur) FELDA United	Free
November 2013	(Malaysia) Mohd Haris Safwan Mohd Kamal	(Malaysia) (Kuala Lumpur) FELDA United	Free
November 2013	(Malaysia) Mohd Daudsu Jamaluddin	(Malaysia) Johor Darul Takzim	Free
November 2013	(Malaysia) S. Subramaniam	(Malaysia) Johor Darul Takzim	Free
November 2013	(Malaysia) Mohd Shakir Shaari	(Malaysia) Johor Darul Takzim	Free
November 2013	(Malaysia) Azizi Matt Rose	(Malaysia) Johor Darul Takzim	Free
November 2013	(Malaysia) K. Nanthakumar	(Malaysia) Negeri Sembilan	Free
November 2013	(Nigeria) Dickson Nwakaeme	(Malaysia) Pahang	Free
November 2013	(Malaysia) Mohd Rizal Fahmi Abdul Rosid	(Malaysia) Selangor	Free
November 2013	(Malaysia) Muhd Izuan Salahuddin	(Malaysia) (Kuala Lumpur) Sime Darby	Free
November 2013	(Malaysia) Zairo Anuar Zalani	(Malaysia) Terengganu	Free
November 2013	(Malaysia) Mohd Nor Farhan Muhammad	(Malaysia) Terengganu	Free
November 2013	(Malaysia) Mohd Faiz Subri	(Malaysia) Terengganu	Free
November 2013	(Guinea) Keita Mandjou	Free agent	
November 2013	(Malaysia) Norhadi Ubaidillah	Free agent	
April 2014	(Lebanon) Mohammed Ghaddar	Free agent	
April 2014	(Nigeria) Obinna Nwaneri	Free agent	

Total received: RM 0 million

== Club officials ==
=== Coaching and medical staff ===
- Manager: Haji Azman Ibrahim
- Assistant manager: Wan Badri Wan Omar
- Head coach: George Boateng
- Assistant coach: Mohd Hashim Mustapha and Zahasmi Ismail
- Goalkeeping coach: Ismail Chawalit Abu Bakar
- Fitness coach: Miro Petrić
- Physiotherapist: Mohd Zainuddin Zakaria

=== Backroom staff ===
- Kit manager: Harun Ismail
- Media official: Md Zuki Deraman
- Security official: Datuk Mohd Farek Abdul Ghani

== Sponsorship ==
=== Shirt sponsor ===
This is the incomplete list of Kelantan FA's current season sponsorship:

- Hotlink
- Syarikat Muda Osman Sdn Bhd (SMO)
- Adabi Consumer Industries Sdn Bhd (ADABI)
- UniKL
- Sinar Harian
- Tresenergy Sdn Bhd (trésenergy)
- Konsortium E-Mutiara Berhad
- Bayam Hospitality
- Andida

=== Material manufacturer ===
- Warriors

== See also ==
- Kelantan FA history
