= 2014 Liga Super goalscorers =

This is the list of 2014 Malaysia Super League goalscorers.

== Goals ==
As of 24 May 2014

11 goals

- (Brazil) Paulo Rangel (Selangor)

10 goals

- (Argentina) Luciano Figueroa (Johor Darul Takzim)

7 goals

- (Singapore) Khairul Amri (LionsXII)
- (Argentina) Matías Conti (Pahang)

6 goals

- (Argentina) Juan Arostegui (ATM)
- (Nigeria) Dickson Nwakaeme (Pahang)
- (Malaysia) S. Chanturu (Sarawak)

4 goals

- (Liberia) Francis Doe (Kelantan)
- (Egypt) Mohamed Shawky (Kelantan)
- (Lebanon) Mohammed Ghaddar (Kelantan)
- (Singapore) Safuwan Baharudin (LionsXII)
- (Liberia) Patrick Wleh (PKNS)
- (Australia) Ryan Griffiths (Sarawak)
- (Malaysia) Zairo Anuar (Terengganu)

3 goals

- (Argentina) Bruno Martelotto (ATM)
- (Malaysia) Badhri Radzi (Kelantan)
- (Singapore) Sufian Anuar (LionsXII)
- (Singapore) Zulfahmi Arifin (LionsXII)
- (Jamaica) Damion Stewart (Pahang)
- (Brazil) Marco Tulio (Perak)
- (Malaysia) Aminuddin Noor (PKNS)
- (Serbia) Milorad Janjuš (Sarawak)
- (Malaysia) Rasyid Aya (Sarawak)
- (Uzbekistan) Dilshod Sharofetdinov (Sime Darby)
- (Malaysia) Fazrul Hazli (Sime Darby)
- (Croatia) Mateo Roskam (Sime Darby)
- (Malaysia) Syukur Saidin (Sime Darby)
- (Indonesia) Patrich Wanggai (T-Team)
- (Malaysia) Nor Farhan Muhammad (Terengganu)

2 goals

- (Malaysia) Christie Jayaseelan (ATM)
- (Haiti) Fabrice Noël (ATM)
- (Malaysia) Amri Yahyah (Johor Darul Takzim)
- (Argentina) Jorge Pereyra Díaz (Johor Darul Takzim)
- (Argentina) Pablo Aimar (Johor Darul Takzim)
- (Malaysia) Safee Sali (Johor Darul Takzim)
- (Malaysia) Fakri Saarani (Kelantan)
- (Malaysia) Khairul Izuan (Kelantan)
- (Singapore) Faris Ramli (LionsXII)
- (Malaysia) Azamuddin Akil (Pahang)
- (Malaysia) Faizol Hussien (Pahang)
- (Malaysia) Fauzi Roslan (Pahang)
- (Malaysia) Hafiz Kamal (Pahang)
- (Malaysia) R. Gopinathan (Pahang)
- (Nigeria) Abdulafees Abdulsalam (Perak)
- (Brazil) Eliel da Cruz Guardiano (Perak)
- (Malaysia) Norhakim Isa (Perak)
- (Malaysia) Fauzan Dzulkifli (PKNS)
- (Malaysia) Shahrul Azhar (PKNS)
- (Hungary) Gábor Gyepes (Sarawak)
- (Malaysia) Joseph Kalang Tie (Sarawak)
- (Indonesia) Andik Vermansyah (Selangor)
- (Malaysia) Thamil Arasu (Selangor)
- (Malaysia) Fadzli Saari (Sime Darby)
- (Malaysia) Fahrul Razi (Sime Darby)
- (Egypt) Mahmoud Amnah (Sime Darby)
- (Malaysia) Nazrul Kamaruzaman (Sime Darby)
- (Malaysia) Marzuki Yusof (T-Team)
- (Malaysia) Ashaari Shamsuddin (Terengganu)
- (Malaysia) Ismail Faruqi (Terengganu)
- (Colombia) Javier Estupiñán (Terengganu)
- (Guinea) Mamadou Barry (Terengganu)
- (Malaysia) Manaf Mamat (Terengganu)
- (Australia) Mario Karlovic (Terengganu)

1 goals

- (Malaysia) Affize Faisal (ATM)
- (Malaysia) Amirizwan Taj (ATM)
- (Saint Vincent and the Grenadines) Marlon James (ATM)
- (Malaysia) Norfazly Alias (ATM)
- (Malaysia) Rezal Zambery (ATM)
- (Malaysia) Riduwan Ma'on (ATM)
- (Malaysia) Yusaini Hafiz (ATM)
- (Malaysia) S. Thinagaran (ATM)
- (Singapore) Baihakki Khaizan (Johor Darul Takzim)
- (Malaysia) Fadhli Shas (Johor Darul Takzim)
- (Malaysia) Fazly Mazlan (Johor Darul Takzim)
- (Singapore) Hariss Harun (Johor Darul Takzim)
- (Malaysia) Mahali Jasuli (Johor Darul Takzim)
- (Malaysia) Nazrin Nawi (Johor Darul Takzim)
- (Malaysia) Norshahrul Idlan Talaha (Johor Darul Takzim)
- (Malaysia) Safiq Rahim (Johor Darul Takzim)
- (Malaysia) Wan Zaharulnizam (Kelantan)
- (Singapore) Afiq Yunos (LionsXII)
- (Singapore) Hafiz Abu Sujad (LionsXII)
- (Singapore) Nazrul Nazari (LionsXII)
- (Singapore) Shakir Hamzah (LionsXII)
- (Malaysia) R. Surendran (Pahang)
- (Malaysia) Saiful Nizam (Pahang)
- (Pakistan) Zesh Rehman (Pahang)
- (Malaysia) J. Partiban (Perak)
- (Malaysia) Khairul Asyraf (Perak)
- (Montenegro) Milan Purović (Perak)
- (Malaysia) R. Mugenthirran (Perak)
- (Malaysia) Sukri Hamid (Perak)
- (Indonesia) Hamka Hamzah (PKNS)
- (Malaysia) Helmi Remeli (PKNS)
- (Croatia) Karlo Primorac (PKNS)
- (Malaysia) Khairu Azrin (PKNS)
- (Malaysia) Nazmi Faiz (PKNS)
- (Malaysia) P. Gunalan (PKNS)
- (Malaysia) Junior Eldstål (Sarawak)
- (Bosnia and Herzegovina) Muamer Salibašić (Sarawak)
- (Malaysia) Afiq Azmi (Selangor)
- (Malaysia) Fitri Shazwan (Selangor)
- (Australia) Steve Pantelidis (Selangor)
- (Malaysia) Arif Ismail (Sime Darby)
- (Malaysia) Failee Ghazli (Sime Darby)
- (Malaysia) Farid Ramli (Sime Darby)
- (Ghana) William Mensah (Sime Darby)
- (Malaysia) Azlan Ismail (T-Team)
- (Malaysia) Badrul Hisyam (T-Team)
- (Brazil) Evaldo Goncalves (T-Team)
- (Rwanda) Jimmy Mulisa (T-Team)
- (Malaysia) Khairan Ezuan (T-Team)
- (Brazil) Leandro Dos Santos (T-Team)
- (Chile) Nelson San Martin (T-Team)
- (Malaysia) Nizad Ayub (T-Team)
- (Malaysia) Ramzul Zahini (T-Team)
- (Malaysia) Azlan Zainal (Terengganu)
- (Malaysia) Faiz Subri (Terengganu)
- (Brazil) Márcio Da Silva (Terengganu)
- (Senegal) Moustapha Dabo (Terengganu)
- (Cameroon) Vincent Bikana (Terengganu)

== Own Goals ==
1 goals

- (Malaysia) Ronny Harun (Sarawak) (for Pahang)
- (Malaysia) Helmi Remeli (PKNS) (for Selangor)
- (Malaysia) Aminuddin Noor (PKNS) (for Johor Darul Takzim)
- (Malaysia) Junior Eldstål (Sarawak) (for Terengganu)
- (Malaysia) Norfazly Alias (ATM) (for Sarawak)

== See also ==
- Super League Malaysia seasons
- 2014 Malaysia Super League
- Malaysia Super League
