= Nelson San Martín =

Chilean footballer (born 1980)

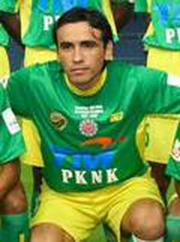
- Nelson with Kedah in 2008

Personal information
- Full name: Nelson Marcelo San Martín Arriagada
- Date of birth: 17 May 1980 (age 46)
- Place of birth: Santiago, Chile
- Height: 1.76 m (5 ft 9 1/2 in)
- Position: Central midfielder

Youth career
- Colo-Colo
- Universidad de Chile

Senior career*
Years	Team	Apps	(Gls)
2000–2004	Universidad de Chile		
2002–2003	→ Deportes Temuco (loan)		
2004	Numancia		
2004–2005	Unión San Felipe		
2005	Estudiantes de Santander		
2005–2006	Curicó Unido		
2006–2008	Kedah FA		
2009–2010	Bangkok Glass		
2010–2011	Home United	9	(1)
2011–2012	Barnechea		
2013	Kedah FA		
2014	T-Team		

Managerial career
- 2020: Langkawi City
- 2024–2025: Kedah
- * Club domestic league appearances and goals

Nelson Marcelo San Martín Arriagada (born 17 May 1980) is a Chilean former professional footballer who played as a midfielder.

== Club career ==
As a child, San Martín was with the Colo-Colo youth team until the age of 15. Then he moved to the traditional rival Universidad de Chile. The former Universidad de Chile midfielder who began to pitch his tent in Alor Star in November 2006 has been playing an influential role for Kedah FA. He excels in his role as the playmaker of the team with his accurate distribution of the ball. In his first year at his new club, he managed to capture the eyes of most Kedah FA fans with his passing and vision, and also with a free kick delivery.

Alongside his teammates, Ahmad Fauzi Saari, Marlon Alex James, Mohd Khyril Muhymeen Zambri, they played the most attractive football in Malaysia. Two years playing for the Canaries, Nelson assisted them to win historical double treble titles.

Eventually, after seeing the domination of foreign footballers in Malaysian football, Football Association of Malaysia ordered all the clubs to release all imports player for the M.League 2009 season. Martín played his last game for Kedah FA on 23 August 2008, which was Malaysia Cup showdown against Selangor FA. He set up a goal for Marlon Alex James and struck a high-quality goal in the match which ended with Kedah won 3–2. Upon his contributions to Kedah FA, he was awarded the Ahli Cemerlang Semangat Jerai (ASK) medal from the Sultan of Kedah.

After his departure from Malaysia, Nelson went to neighbors Thailand and played 1 season with Bangkok Glass and later on relocated to Singapore in order to join Home United FC in a 6-month contract. A 3-month injury caused Nelson to miss half of his season with Home United, causing his contract to not be extended.

Nelson then left Southeast Asia and went on to sign with Chilean club, Athletic Club Barnechea for the 2011/12 season.

He was released by Barnechea in mid-2012 after a poor season with the club.

In November 2012, Nelson return to Kedah to play for the Canaries in the 2013 Malaysia Premier League. After only a season with them, he joined PBDKT T-Team FC for the 2014 Malaysia Super League season.

== Honours ==
=== Club ===
Universidad de Chile

- Primera División de Chile: 2000
- Copa Chile: 2000

Kedah FA

- Malaysian Super League: 2006–07, 2007–08
- Malaysia Cup: 2007, 2008
- Malaysia FA Cup: 2007, 2008
