= Evaldo (footballer, born 1981) =

Brazilian footballer (born 1981)

Personal information
- Full name: Evaldo Rodrigues Gonçalves
- Date of birth: 10 January 1981 (age 45)
- Place of birth: Goiânia, Goiás, Brazil
- Height: 5 ft 10 in (1.78 m)
- Position: Striker

Youth career
- –2000: Goiás

Senior career*
Years	Team	Apps	(Gls)
2000–2001	Xiamen Lanshi	11	(2)
2005–2006	União Banderainte	8	(2)
2006–2007	Caldense	17	(14)
2007–2008	Joinville Esporte Clube	22	(21)
2009–2013	Hoang Anh Gia Lai	82	(68)
2014–2015	T-Team	1	(1)
Total		141	(118)
- * Club domestic league appearances and goals

Evaldo Rodrigues Gonçalves (born 10 January 1981) is a former Brazilian football forward.

Born in Goiânia, Evaldo was part of the city's most prestigious club Goiás' academy. After a brief period at Xiamen Lanshi in China, he returned to Brazil such as União Bandeirante, Caldense and Joinville.

Evaldo joined Hoang Anh Gia Lai in 2009 upon Joinville's disbandment a year prior and became a fan-favourite throughout his four years there. He then spent another year for T-Team in Malaysia, getting involved in an altercation with Crown Prince of Johor Tunku Ismail Idris alongside teammate Fábio Flor when both were to play Johor Darul Ta'zim.

== Honours ==
Hoang Anh Gia Lai

- V.League 1 runners-up: 2010
