= Mohd Aminuddin Mohd Noor =

Malaysian professional football player

Personal information
- Full name: Mohd Aminuddin Mohd Noor
- Date of birth: 18 August 1991 (age 35)
- Place of birth: Kelantan, Malaysia
- Height: 1.74 m (5 ft 8 1/2 in)
- Positions: Right-back; right winger; right midfielder

Team information
- Current team: PKNS FC
- Number: 20

Youth career
- 2009–2012: Kelantan President's Cup Team

Senior career*
Years	Team	Apps	(Gls)
2012–present	PKNS FC	21	(4)

International career^{‡}
2012–2013	Malaysia U-23	4	(0)
- * Club domestic league appearances and goals as of 29 December 2015 ‡ National team caps and goals as of 29 December 2015

Mohd Aminuddin Mohd Noor (born 18 August 1991 in Pasir Mas, Kelantan) is a Malaysian professional football player currently playing for Kelantan FA in the Malaysian Super League as a defender. He previously playing for PKNS FC after three year playing for others team.
