= Ramzul Zahini Adenan =

Malaysian footballer

Ramzul Zahini
Personal information
- Full name: Muhammad Ramzul Zahini bin Adenan
- Date of birth: 11 December 1987 (age 38)
- Place of birth: Wakaf Bharu, Kelantan, Malaysia
- Height: 1.75 m (5 ft 9 in)
- Position: Striker

Youth career
- 2006–2007: Kelantan President's Cup

Senior career*
Years	Team	Apps	(Gls)
2007–2012	Kelantan	138	(79)
2013	Selangor	19	(14)
2014–2017	T–Team	22	(16)

International career^{‡}
2010	Malaysia U23	9	(2)
2011	Malaysia	93	(55)
- * Club domestic league appearances and goals as of September 07, 2016 ‡ National team caps and goals as of September 07, 2016

Muhammad Ramzul Zahini bin Adenan (born 11 December 1987) is a former Malaysian footballer who plays as a striker.

== Club career ==
=== Kelantan FA ===
Born in Tumpat, Kelantan, Ramzul started his career on year 2006 with Kelantan President's Cup Team for two years. Then, he was promoted to the senior squad after shows an excellent performances with the youth team.

On the 2012 Malaysia Super League season, he failed to get the first team squad after the foreign players were eligible to play in the Malaysia Super League.

=== Selangor FA ===
Then, he decided to sign with Selangor FA for the 2013 Malaysia Super League season.

=== T-Team F.C. ===
In 2014, Ramzul moved to T-Team F.C.

== International career ==
He had been called up by K.Rajagobal for Malaysia national under-23 football team on year 2010 but he was suffer an injury on that time.

== Career statistics ==
=== Club statistics ===
As of 28 January 2017.

Club performance			League		Cup		League Cup		Continental		Total	
Season	Club	League	Apps	Goals	Apps	Goals	Apps	Goals	Apps	Goals	Apps	Goals
Malaysia			League		FA Cup		Malaysia Cup		Asia		Total	
2013	Selangor	Malaysia Super League	0	1	0	0	0	0	-		0	1
Total			0	1	0	0	0	0	-	-	0	1
2014	T-Team	Malaysia Super League	0	2	0	0	0	0	-		0	2
2015	T-Team	Malaysia Super League	1	0	0	0	0	0	-		0	0
2016	T-Team	Malaysia Super League	7	0	0	0	0	0	-		7	0
2017	T-Team	Malaysia Super League	2	0	0	0	0	0	-		2	0
Total			0	0	0	0	0	0	-	-	0	0
Career total			1	0	0	0	0	0	-	-	1	0
