= Hasbullah Awang (footballer) =

Malaysian footballer

Hasbullah
Personal information
- Full name: Mohammed Hasbullah bin Awang
- Date of birth: 3 April 1983 (age 43)
- Place of birth: Felda Jerangau, Terengganu, Malaysia
- Height: 1.72 m (5 ft 7 1/2 in)
- Position: Centre back

Team information
- Current team: Terengganu II
- Number: 5

Senior career*
Years	Team	Apps	(Gls)
2011–	Terengganu II	91	(0)
- * Club domestic league appearances and goals as of 2 February 2018

Mohammed Hasbullah bin Awang (born 3 April 1983 in Terengganu) is a Malaysian footballer who plays and captain for Terengganu II in Malaysia Premier League as a defender.

== Career statistics ==
As of 6 August 2017.

Club performance		League		Cup		League Cup		Continental		Total	
Season	Club	Apps	Goals	Apps	Goals	Apps	Goals	Apps	Goals	Apps	Goals
Malaysia		League		Cup		League Cup		—		Total	
2015	T–Team	22	0	6	0	1	0	–	–	29	0
2016	T–Team	19	0	1	0	6	0	–	–	26	0
2017	T–Team	19	0	2	0	3	0	–	–	24	0
Total		60	0	9	0	10	0	–	–	79	0
Career Total								–	–		
