= Martin Kafando =

Burkinabé footballer

Personal information
- Full name: Wendwoga Didier Martin Kafando
- Date of birth: April 24, 1988 (age 38)
- Place of birth: Ouagadougou, Burkina Faso
- Height: 1.90 m (6 ft 3 in)
- Position: Defender

Senior career*
| Years | Team | Apps | (Gls) |
| 2007–2014 | USFA | | |
| 2014 | Perak FA | 6 | (0) |
- USFA

International career
| 2013 | Burkina Faso | 1 | (0) |
- * Club domestic league appearances and goals

Martin Kafando (born 24 April 1988) is a Burkinabé football defender.
