= Abdul Ghani Rahman =

Malaysian footballer

Abdul Ghani
Personal information
- Full name: Abdul Ghani Bin Abdul Rahman
- Date of birth: 12 December 1985 (age 40)
- Place of birth: Selangor, Malaysia
- Height: 1.74 m (5 ft 8 1/2 in)
- Positions: Right back; defender

Team information
- Current team: Marcerra Kuantan
- Number: 17

Youth career
- 2005–2006: Selangor President Cup Team's

Senior career*
| Years | Team | Apps | (Gls) |
| 2005–2006 | MK Land | | |
| 2006–2008 | Selangor | | |
| 2009–2012 | Felda United | | |
| 2013 | Negeri Sembilan | | |
| 2014–2017 | PKNS | | |
| 2018– | Marcerra Kuantan | | |
- * Club domestic league appearances and goals as of January 24, 2017

Abdul Ghani Bin Abdul Rahman (born 12 December 1985) is a Malaysian footballer who plays as a defender for Marcerra Kuantan in the Malaysia Premier League.

Ghani played for PKNS, Negeri Sembilan, Selangor and MK Land and Felda United.
