= Tuan Muhamad Faim =

Malaysian footballer

Personal information
- Full name: Tuan Muhamad Faim bin Tuan Zainal Abidin
- Date of birth: 21 July 1991 (age 35)
- Place of birth: Kelantan, Malaysia
- Height: 1.78 m (5 ft 10 in)
- Position: Right-back

Youth career
- ????–2011: Kelantan President's Cup Team

Senior career*
Years	Team	Apps	(Gls)
2012–2017	Kelantan	2	(0)
2016	→ MOF (loan)	3	(0)
- * Club domestic league appearances and goals as of July 20, 2016

Tuan Muhamad Faim Bin Tuan Zainal Abidin (born 21 July 1991) is a Malaysian professional footballer who currently a free agent. He is a defender who can operate as a right back.

== Club career ==
=== Kelantan FA ===
Faim began his football career playing for Kelantan FA President's Cup team before promoted to senior team in 2012.

=== MOF F.C. ===
In May 2016, Faim joined Malaysia FAM League club MOF F.C. on loan deal until the end of the season.

=== Club statistics ===
As of 25 September 2016.

Club performance			League		Cup		League Cup		Continental		Total	
Season	Club	League	Apps	Goals	Apps	Goals	Apps	Goals	Apps	Goals	Apps	Goals
Malaysia			League		FA Cup		Malaysia Cup		Asia		Total	
2012	Kelantan	Malaysia Super League	0	0	0	0	0	0	0	0	0	0
2013	Kelantan	Malaysia Super League	0	0	0	0	0	0	0	0	0	
2014	Kelantan	Malaysia Super League	0	0	0	0	0	0	4	0	4	0
2015	Kelantan	Malaysia Super League	2	0	0	0	0	0	-		2	0
2016	Kelantan	Malaysia Super League	0	0	0	0	0	0	-		0	0
Total			2	0	0	0	0	0	4	0	6	0
2016	MOF	Malaysia FAM Cup	0	0	0	0	0	0	-		0	0
Total			0	0	0	0	0	0	-		0	0
Career total			2	0	0	0	0	0	4	0	6	0
