= Lot Abu Hassan =

Malaysian footballer

Personal information
- Full name: Mohd Lot Bin Abu Hassan
- Date of birth: 23 July 1984 (age 42)
- Place of birth: Selangor, Malaysia
- Height: 1.72 m (5 ft 7 1/2 in)
- Position: Midfielder

Team information
- Current team: Ultimate
- Number: 11

Youth career
- 2001–2005: Selangor President's Team

Senior career*
| Years | Team | Apps | (Gls) |
| 2006–2008 | PKNS | 29 | (3) |
| 2009–2010 | KL Plus | 20 | (5) |
| 2011–2012 | FELDA United | 21 | (2) |
| 2013 | PKNS | 29 | (3) |
| 2014–2015 | Sarawak | 15 | (0) |
| 2016–2017 | PDRM | 17 | (1) |
| 2018 | Penang | 7 | (0) |
| 2019 | Puchong Fuerza | | |
| 2020– | Ultimate | | |
- * Club domestic league appearances and goals as of June 12, 2020

Mohd Lot Abu Hassan (born 23 June 1984) is a Malaysian footballer who plays for Ultimate F.C. as a midfielder.
