= Fábio Flor =

Brazilian footballer (born 1981)

Fabio Flor
Personal information
- Full name: Fabio Flor de Azevedo
- Date of birth: 16 January 1981 (age 45)
- Place of birth: Macaé, Rio de Janeiro, Brazil
- Height: 1.90 m (6 ft 3 in)
- Position: Centre-back

Senior career*
| Years | Team | Apps | (Gls) |
| 2000–2001 | Coritiba | | |
| 2001 | Rio Branco | | |
| 2002 | Independente | | |
| 2003–2004 | Macae | | |
| 2005–2008 | Terengganu | 109 | (24) |
| 2008–2009 | Emirates | | (8) |
| 2009–2010 | Al Sahel | | (4) |
| 2010–2011 | Mabarra | | (2) |
| 2012–2013 | Busaiteen | | (9) |
| 2014 | T-Team | | |
| 2015–2016 | Bahrain | | |
| 2016–2017 | Busaiteen | | |
- * Club domestic league appearances and goals

Fábio Flor de Azevedo (born 16 January 1981), simply known as Fábio Flor, is a Brazilian former professional footballer who played as a centre-back.

== Club career ==
Between 2005 and 2008, Fábio played for Terengganu FA in the Malaysia Super League. Fábio played for Bahrain SC in the Bahraini Second Division during the 2015–16 season. On 9 August 2016, he returned to fellow Second Division side Busaiteen.
