= Warriors (brand) =

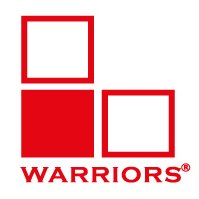
- Company type: Public limited company
- Industry: Sporting goods
- Founded: 2012
- Founder: KAFA
- Headquarters: Kota Bharu, Kelantan, Malaysia
- Area served: Asia
- Products: Sportswear; Balls; Accessories
- Website: www.warriors.com.my

Warriors (brand) is a Malaysian corporation that is engaged in the design and manufacturer of football (soccer) equipment and apparel and accessories based in Kota Bharu, Kelantan, Malaysia. In Malaysia, they produce kits and training equipment for Kelantan Football Association since 2012. They also produce jersey, clothing, kits and training equipment for Malaysia Premier League team, Perlis FA for 2013 season.

== Sponsorships ==
=== Football ===
Teams

2012

- (Malaysia) Kelantan FA

2013

- (Malaysia) Kelantan FA
- (Malaysia) Perlis FA
- (Myanmar) Nay Pyi Taw

2014

- (Malaysia) Kelantan FA
- (Myanmar) Nay Pyi Taw

2015

- (Malaysia) Kelantan FA
