= Nazri Ahmad =

Malaysian footballer

Personal information
- Full name: Muhd Nazri bin Ahmad
- Date of birth: 17 March 1990 (age 36)
- Place of birth: Kuala Lumpur, Malaysia
- Height: 1.76 m (5 ft 9 1/2 in)
- Positions: Right back; centre back; defensive midfielder

Senior career*
Years	Team	Apps	(Gls)
2010–2011	Harimau Muda A		
2011	→ Selangor FA (loan)		
2012	Felda United FC		
2013	Johor United		
2013	Johor Darul Takzim FC		
2014–2016	Kelantan FA		
2016	Sabah FA		
2016	Kuala Lumpur FA		
2017	Melaka United	5	(0)

International career^{‡}
2009–2011	Malaysia U21		
- * Club domestic league appearances and goals as of July 22, 2017 ‡ National team caps and goals as of January 23, 2017

Muhd Nazri bin Ahmad (born 17 March 1990) is a Malaysian footballer.

== Club career ==
=== Kelantan ===
On 13 December 2013, it was announced that his contract with Kelantan was legit and may play for Kelantan in 2014. The controversy occurred after he signed a contract with two clubs. Nazri prior signed with Selangor but later decided to play with Kelantan.

=== Melaka United ===
On 14 January 2017, Nazri has been announced as one of the Melaka United players for 2017 season.

== Statistics ==
=== Club ===
As of match played 28 October 2017.

Appearances and goals by club, season and competition
Club	Season	League			Cup		League Cup		Continental		Total	
Club	Season	Division	Apps	Goals	Apps	Goals	Apps	Goals	Apps	Goals	Apps	Goals
Kuala Lumpur	2016	Liga Premier	3	0	0	0	2	0	–	–	5	0
Melaka United	2017	Liga Super	5	0	0	0	1	0	–	–	6	0
Total			0	0	0	0	0	0	–	–	0	0
Career Total			0	0	0	0	0	0	–	–	0	0
