= Rashid Aya =

Malaysian footballer

Personal information
- Full name: Mohamad Rashid bin Mohamed Aya
- Date of birth: 4 June 1990 (age 36)
- Place of birth: Mersing, Johor, Malaysia
- Height: 1.68 m (5 ft 6 in)
- Positions: Midfielder; striker

Team information
- Current team: Felcra F.C.
- Number: 27

Youth career
- 2007–2009: Johor FC President's Cup Team

Senior career*
Years	Team	Apps	(Gls)
2009–2011	Johor FC	24	(4)
2012	Sarawak FA		
2013	Johor FA		
2014	Sarawak FA		
2015	Felda United F.C.		
2016	Kuala Lumpur FA		
2017	Penang FA		
2018	Felcra F.C.		
- * Club domestic league appearances and goals as of July 13, 2018

Mohamad Rashid bin Mohamed Aya (born 4 June 1990) is a Malaysian footballer currently playing for Felcra F.C. in Malaysia Premier League.

Formerly, he played for Felda United F.C., and Sarawak FA.
