= Mohd Marzuki Yusof =

Malaysian footballer

Mohd Marzuki
Personal information
- Full name: Mohd Marzuki bin Yusof
- Date of birth: 3 January 1981 (age 45)
- Place of birth: Terengganu, Malaysia
- Height: 1.84 m (6 ft 1/2 in)
- Position: Defender

Senior career*
Years	Team	Apps	(Gls)
2001–2003	Terengganu FA		
2004–2005	Melaka Telekom		
2006–2012	Terengganu FA		
2013–2016	T-Team		

International career^{‡}
2002–2006	Malaysia	4	(0)
- * Club domestic league appearances and goals as of 30 November 2015 ‡ National team caps and goals as of 27 January 2017

Mohd Marzuki Yusof (born 3 January 1981) is a Malaysian former footballer who last playing for T-Team, a team playing in the Malaysian Super League. He was a former member of Malaysia national U-23 team.

He played almost of his career with Terengganu, also playing with Melaka Telekom for two seasons. He is the current captain of the T-Team. He also the member of Malaysia national senior team from 2002 until 2003. After five years of absence from national team, Marzuki earned a call-up for 2011 AFC Asian Cup qualification.
