= Gunalan Padathan =

Malaysian footballer

Padathan Gunalan
Personal information
- Full name: Gunalan a/l Padathan
- Date of birth: 11 September 1981 (age 45)
- Place of birth: Selangor, Malaysia
- Height: 1.74 m (5 ft 8 1/2 in)
- Positions: Defender; midfielder

Team information
- Current team: Bunga Raya (assistant)

Youth career
- 1999–2000: Selangor

Senior career*
Years	Team	Apps	(Gls)
2001–2012	Selangor	212	(14)
2013–2019	PKNS	83	(0)
2019–2020	Petaling Jaya City FC	26	(0)

International career
2004–2007	Malaysia	4	(0)
- * Club domestic league appearances and goals

Gunalan a/l Padathan (born 11 September 1981) is a former Malaysian professional footballer who played as a defender or midfielder.

== Honours ==
=== Club ===
Selangor

- Division 1 / Premier 1 / Super League
  - Winners (2): 2009, 2010
  - Runner-up (1): 2002
- Division 2 /Premier 2 / Premier League
  - Winners (1): 2005
- Charity Cup
  - Winners (3): 2002, 2009, 2010
  - Runner-up (3): 2003, 2006, 2011
- Malaysia Cup
  - Winners (2): 2002, 2005
  - Runner-up (1): 2008
- FA Cup
  - Winners (3): 2001, 2005, 2009
  - Runner-up (1): 2008

PKNS

- FA Cup
  - Runner-up (1): 2016
- Premier League
  - Runners-up (1): 2016
