= Hussein Alaa Hussein =

Iraqi footballer

Hussein Alaa
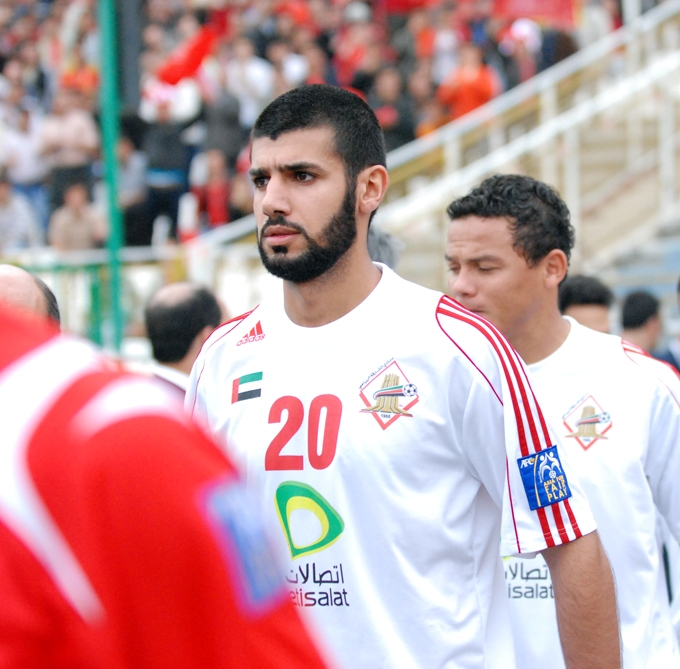

Personal information
- Full name: Hussein Alaa Hussein salman
- Date of birth: 4 August 1987 (age 39)
- Place of birth: Baghdad, Iraq
- Height: 1.90 m (6 ft 3 in)
- Positions: Defender; center back

Youth career
- Al-Quwa Al-Jawiya
- 2005: Al-Zawraa

Senior career*
Years	Team	Apps	(Gls)
2006	Al-Nasr Dubai SC	20	(4)
2007	FUS de Rabat	28	(2)
2008–2009	Sharjah FC	6	(0)
2009	Qingdao Jonoon	13	(2)
2010	Shenzhen Ruby	21	(3)
2011–2012	Zakho FC	57	(3)
2012	Al-Quwa Al-Jawiya	20	(2)
2013	Bangkok United	24	(0)
2014–2015	Kelantan FA	27	(1)
2016	Hanoi		

International career^{‡}
2007	Iraq U14	3	(0)
2008	Iraq U17	6	(2)
- * Club domestic league appearances and goals as of April 25, 2014 ‡ National team caps and goals as of April 25, 2014

Hussein Alaa Hussein (Arabic: حسين علاء حسين, born August 4, 1987) is an Iraqi former footballer who plays as a centre-back.

== Career ==
Hussein Alaa Hussein made his name as the star performer in Iraq's U-17s side managed by Nasrat Nassir and was chosen the best player in Asian Championship qualifiers in Qatar Doha in 2008. His performances earned him an offer of a contract and a chance to gain UAE nationality to play for Al-Ain. The defender spent time in the Emirates having getting a visa through Iraqi coach Jamal Salih, then supervisor of the youth section at Al-Sharjah, but he returned to Iraq to continue his career. He had caught the eye playing for the club against a Russian club and Al-Karama of Syria.

Hussein joined Qingdao Jonoon in July 2009 and became the first Iraqi footballer in Chinese football league. He scored first goal for Qingdao on August 22, 2009, with 2–1 win over Changsha Ginde. He transferred to Shenzhen Ruby on 28 February 2010.

In 2014, he has signed a 6-month-long contract with Malaysian Super League club Kelantan FA.

== Honours (Individual) ==
- Was chosen to be the best professional player 2013 year in Thailand, to be within 11 player Thailand Star to match against English Premier League champion Chelsea, then coached by Mourinho.
- The first professional player to Iraqi and Arab plays and he plays and scores 3 goals for Chinese Super League year 2010.
- One of three Iraqi professional players playing in the Asia Cup for Club Professional League year 2009.
- Was chosen to be the best professional Foreign player in Morocco Premier League for the year 2008.
- Was chosen to be the best player in The Asian Championship that was held in Qatar – Doha for the year 2008.
