= Fauzi Saari =

Malaysian professional football player

Personal information
- Full name: Ahmad Fauzi bin Saari
- Date of birth: 30 April 1982 (age 44)
- Place of birth: Kulim, Kedah, Malaysia
- Height: 1.73 m (5 ft 8 in)
- Position: Central midfielder

Team information
- Current team: Kedah Darul Aman (Team Coordinator)

Youth career
- 2002–2004: Kedah FA President's Cup Team

Senior career*
| Years | Team | Apps | (Gls) |
| 2004–2011 | Kedah FA | | |
| 2012 | Johor FC | | |
| 2013 | Felda United | | |
| 2014 | ATM FA | | |
| 2015 | Negeri Sembilan FA | 0 | (0) |
| 2016 | Perlis FA | 5 | (0) |

International career^{‡}
| 2004 | Malaysia U-23 | | |
- * Club domestic league appearances and goals as of 4 September 2019 ‡ National team caps and goals as of 15 May 2014

Ahmad Fauzi Saari (born 30 April 1982), is a Malaysian professional football player who last played as a central midfielder for Malaysia Super League side Perlis FA.

== Early life ==
Ahmad Fauzi Saari grew up in Ladang Anak Kulim, where his father was a supervisor (Malay: mandor) and her mother used to ease their financial burden by tapping rubber there. He started playing football since he was a schoolboy, often with his multi-racial friends at the estate. In age of 16, his non-stop running style and talent in football was then discovered by teachers at Sekolah Menengah Kebangsaan Serdang (a secondary school in Serdang, Kedah).

== Club career ==
=== Early career ===
In 2002, he was selected for the Sukma Games to represent the Kedah state.

=== Kedah FA ===
He was a part of Kedah during the 2006/07 season.

== National team ==
In 2004, he was discovered Allan Harris. Fauzi played in one match – in the 4–1 defeat to Iran on 3 March 2004.

== Honours ==
=== Kedah ===
- Malaysia Super League: 2006/07, 2007/08
  - Runner-up: 2003
- Malaysia Premier League: 2002, 2005/06
  - Runner-up: 2005
- Malaysia FA Cup: 2006/07, 2007/08
- Malaysia Cup: 2006/07, 2007/08
  - Runner-up: 2004
