= William Mensah =

Ghanaian retired footballer (born 1982)

Personal information
- Full name: William Mensah
- Date of birth: July 15, 1982 (age 44)
- Place of birth: Accra, Ghana
- Height: 1.85 m (6 ft 1 in)
- Position: Centre back

Youth career
- 2001–2005: Cornerstones Kumasi

Senior career*
Years	Team	Apps	(Gls)
2006–2008	Ashanti Gold	13	(0)
2008–2009	Haras El Hodood	6	(0)
2009–2010	Lierse	8	(0)
2010–2013	Wadi Degla	23	(0)
2013	→ Lierse (loan)	8	(0)
2013	→ Turnhout (loan)	12	(0)
2014–2015	Sime Darby	20	(0)
2015	Al Hazm		
- * Club domestic league appearances and goals

William Mensah (born July 15, 1982, in Accra) is a Ghanaian retired footballer who played as a defender.

== Career ==
=== Haras El Hodood ===
Mensah previously played for Haras El Hodood, whom he helped win the 2008–09 Egypt Cup. He played well in Haras El Hodood's CAF Confederation Cup 2008 campaign. Mensah was involved in an incident with Ahly's striker Flávio Amado in an Egyptian Premier League match on 11 May 2009.

=== Lierse ===
27 May 2009 it was announced that he joined the Belgium club Lierse S.K. with a 2-year contract. The team gained promotion to the Belgian First Division by the end of that season, but meantime the Ghanaian defender appeared only 8 times during that campaign. That was due to a serious shoulder injury.

=== Wadi Degla ===
On 17 May 2010, Lierse announced that Mensah will join the Egyptian sister club, Wadi Degla, from the beginning of next season. Mensah is returning to Egypt once more, but to help a newly promoted team to the Egyptian Premier League this time.

== International career ==
Mensah was called up in the Ghana national football team for a 2010 FIFA World Cup qualification against Egypt in January 2009, but did not appear in the match.

== Honours ==
With Haras El Hodood

- Winner of Egyptian Soccer Cup 2009.
