= Amar Rohidan =

Malaysian footballer

Personal information
- Full name: Mohd Amar bin Rohidan
- Date of birth: 23 April 1987 (age 39)
- Place of birth: Kedah, Malaysia
- Height: 1.72 m (5 ft 7 1/2 in)
- Position: Midfielder

Team information
- Current team: Perlis GSA (team manager)

Senior career*
Years	Team	Apps	(Gls)
2005–2010	Perlis		
2011–2012	Kedah Darul Aman		
2013	Felda United		
2014–2015	Kelantan		
2016	Kedah Darul Aman	5	(0)

International career^{‡}
2009	Malaysia U-23		
2009–2012	Malaysia	32	(0)
Medal record
Men's Football
Representing Malaysia
AFF Championship
Winner	2010
Malaysia U23
SEA Games
First place	2009
Malaysia U18
Lion City Cup
First place	2005
- * Club domestic league appearances and goals as of 26 September 2025 ‡ National team caps and goals as of 24 January 2017

Mohd Amar bin Rohidan (born 23 April 1987) is a Malaysian former professional footballer who played as a midfielder.

== Club career ==
=== Perlis ===
Amar started his career with Perlis FA in year 2005 and played with the team for six seasons.

=== Kedah ===
He decided to move on and join their rival Kedah FA for two seasons. In the 2012 Malaysia Super League season, he refused to sign a new contract after his team was relegated to the Malaysia Premier League.

=== FELDA United ===
He signed with Felda United which was competing in the 2013 Malaysia Super League. After playing a season with Felda United, he was released by the club.

=== Kelantan ===
For the 2014 seasons, he joined Kelantan FA with a two-year contract.

=== Kedah ===
After leaving Kelantan at the end of the 2015 season, he joined Kedah FA for his second stint at the club. He won the 2016 Malaysia Cup, but was released at the end of the season. Amar has not played professionally for any club since then, although he turned up for Perlis in the amateur King's Gold Cup competition in 2018.

== International career ==
He was also a member of the Malaysian national team. In November 2010, Amar was called up to the national squad by coach K. Rajagopal for the 2010 AFF Suzuki Cup. Malaysia won the Suzuki Cup title for the first time in their history.

== Honours ==
=== Club ===
Perlis FA

- Malaysia Cup: 2006; runner up 2005
- Malaysia Super League: 2005; runner up 2009
- FA Cup Malaysia: 2006, 2007
- Charity Shield: 2006, 2007; runner-up 2005

Kelantan FA

- Malaysia FA Cup runner-up: 2015

Kedah FA

- Malaysia Premier League: 2015
- Malaysia Cup: 2016

=== International ===
Malaysia U-18

- Lion City Cup: 2005

Malaysia U-23

- SEA Games : 2009

Malaysia

- AFF Championship: 2010

== Personal life ==
As of March 2011, Amar Rohidan has been married with Farhana.
