= Tengku Hasbullah =

Malaysian footballer

Personal information
- Birth name: Tengku Hasbullah bin Raja Hassan
- Date of birth: 11 March 1983 (age 43)
- Place of birth: Kelantan, Malaysia
- Position: Midfielder

Senior career*
Years	Team	Apps	(Gls)
2001–2003	Kelantan FA		
- Telekom Melaka
2011–2012	T-Team	32	(0)
2013	Kedah FA		
2014	Kelantan FA		
- * Club domestic league appearances and goals as of 27 November 2013

Tengku Hasbullah bin Raja Hassan (born 11 March 1983) is a Malaysian footballer who currently is a free agent. He has played for Kelantan FA, T-Team and Kedah FA in his career.

His older brother Tengku Hazman is also a former professional football player.
