= Steve Darby =

English footballer and manager (born 1955)

Personal information
- Full name: Stephen David Darby
- Date of birth: 15 January 1955 (age 71)
- Place of birth: Liverpool, Merseyside, England
- Position: Goalkeeper

Managerial career
- Years: Team
- 1978–1979: Bahrain
- 1995–1998: Sydney Olympic
- 1998–2000: Johor
- 2001–2002: Vietnam Women
- 2002–2005: Home United
- 2005–2008: Perak
- 2008: Thailand (assistant)
- 2009: Thailand U23
- 2011: Mohun Bagan
- 2014: Kelantan
- 2014: Mumbai City (assistant)
- 2015–2016: Laos

Stephen David Darby (born 15 January 1955) is an English football coach and former player. He is well known throughout Asia as a pundit for ESPN Star Sports.

== Managerial career ==
=== Bahrain ===
Darby started his football manager career in 1978 where his first coaching role is with the Bahrain national team.

=== Australia ===
Darby relocated to Australia and by 1981 he was director of soccer coaching in Tasmania. In March 1987 he joined the ACT Academy of Soccer; he later became director of soccer coaching for Australian Capital Territory's teams. In February 1989, he was appointed coach of the women's Australia B (Gold team) for the Oceania Cup held in Brisbane in March. His team defeated Papua New Guinea 2–0 in their first game. They drew 0–0 against Australia A (Green team), but lost against both Chinese Taipei (0–4) and New Zealand (0-2). Australia B finished equal third with Australia A – their playoff game was washed out and abandoned. By August Darby was the Australia's Female Socceroos' coach. He was arguing for "total freedom of choice in the selection of my immediate staff" and a contract system for players.

=== Sydney Olympic ===
In 1995, Darby was appointed by Australian semi-professional club Sydney Olympic as the club manager.

=== Johor FA ===
In 1998, Darby was appointed as the Malaysian club manager at Johor FA.

=== Vietnam women ===
In January 2001, Darby was appointed by the Vietnam women national team as their head coach.

=== Home United ===
In September 2002, S.League club Home United hired Darby as their manager. In his time at the club, he steered Home United to win the cup double in 2003 which is the 2003 S.League and the 2003 Singapore Cup. Darby also steered them to win the 2005 Singapore Cup.

=== Perak FA ===
On 8 November 2005, Darby then moved to Malaysia again but this time to signed with Perak FA.

=== Thailand ===
On 17 July 2008, Darby was appointed as the assistant coach under Peter Reid for the Thailand national team while Darby was also appointed as Thailand U23 head coach.

=== Mohun Bagan ===
On 19 July 2011, Darby was appointed at Indian club Mohun Bagan as their manager however his reign fell short as he was sacked on 15 October.

=== Kelantan ===
In January 2014, Darby returned to Malaysia to signed with Kelantan as the club manager.

=== Mumbai City ===
In July 2014, Darby reunited with Peter Reid as his assistant at Indian Super League club Mumbai City where he coached Nicolas Anelka and Freddie Ljungberg, who were by then approaching retirement.

=== Laos ===
In May 2015, Darby was approached by Laos as the team head coach where it became his third national team stint that he coached.

== Personal life ==
Darby married Australian soccer player, Anissa Tann, in November 1994. The couple were divorced before March 2003.

== Honours ==
=== As Manager ===
==== Home United ====
- S.League: 2003
- Singapore Cup: 2003, 2005
