= Mohamed Shawky =

Egyptian footballer (born 1981)

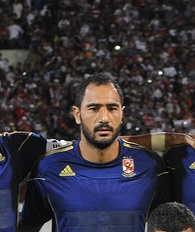
- Shawky with Al Ahly in 2011

Personal information
- Full name: Mohamed Ali Aboel Yazid Shawky
- Date of birth: 5 October 1981 (age 45)
- Place of birth: Port Said, Egypt
- Height: 1.81 m (5 ft 11 in)
- Position: Defensive midfielder

Youth career
- 1998–2000: Al Masry

Senior career*
| Years | Team | Apps | (Gls) |
| 2000–2003 | Al Masry | 60 | (15) |
| 2003–2007 | Al Ahly | 92 | (21) |
| 2007–2010 | Middlesbrough | 18 | (0) |
| 2010 | Kayserispor | 11 | (0) |
| 2010–2012 | Al Ahly | 18 | (1) |
| 2012–2013 | Al Naft | 0 | (0) |
| 2013–2014 | Kelantan | 16 | (8) |
| 2014–2015 | El Mokawloon | 14 | (0) |
| Total | | 230 | (45) |

International career
| 2001–2012 | Egypt | 65 | (5) |
- * Club domestic league appearances and goals

Mohamed Ali Aboel Yazid Shawky (Arabic: محمد علي أبو اليزيد شوقي; born 5 October 1981) is an Egyptian former professional footballer who played as a defensive midfielder. Between 2001 and 2012, he made 65 appearances scoring 5 goals for the Egypt national team. He played every minute of Egypt's 2006 Africa Cup of Nations campaign.

== Club career ==
Shawky joined Middlesbrough on 31 August 2007 for £650,000 and signed a three-year contract. He made his Boro debut against Tottenham Hotspur on 26 September 2007 in the 3rd round of the 2007–08 League Cup. Shawky played the first half, with the match ending in a 2–0 win for Tottenham. Hampered by injuries during his first season, Shawky played central midfield in Middlesbrough's opening premier league game of the 2008–09 season against Tottenham Hotspur which Middlesbrough won 2–1.

On 8 January 2010, Shawky signed a 2 1/2-year contract with Kayserispor. In June 2010, he and the club ended the contract by mutual consent, allowing Shawky to return to Egypt, joining Al Ahly. After two good seasons with Ahly, he put in a transfer request to leave Ahly in July 2012.

He joined Malaysian Super League club Kelantan FA in 2013. He was released by the club after the season ended. He joined El Mokawloon SC in 2015 that played in Egyptian Premier League

== International career ==
During the 2009 FIFA Confederations Cup, he scored Egypt's second goal against Brazil in the group stage's opening game.

== Career statistics ==
=== International ===
Appearances and goals by national team and year
| National team | Year | Apps | Goals |
|---|---|---|---|
| Egypt | 2001 | 1 | 0 |
| Egypt | 2002 | 4 | 0 |
| Egypt | 2004 | 9 | 1 |
| Egypt | 2005 | 14 | 2 |
| Egypt | 2006 | 11 | 0 |
| Egypt | 2007 | 5 | 0 |
| Egypt | 2008 | 10 | 0 |
| Egypt | 2009 | 9 | 2 |
| Egypt | 2011 | 1 | 0 |
| Egypt | 2012 | 1 | 0 |
| Total | | 65 | 5 |

Scores and results list Egypt's goal tally first, score column indicates score after each Shawky goal.

List of international goals scored by Mohamed Shawky
| No. | Date | Venue | Opponent | Score | Result | Competition |
|---|---|---|---|---|---|---|
| 1 | 5 September 2004 | Osman Ahmed Osman Stadium, Cairo, Egypt | Cameroon | 1–0 | 3–2 | 2006 FIFA World Cup qualification |
| 2 | 8 January 2005 | Cairo Military Academy Stadium, Cairo, Egypt | Uganda | 2–0 | 3–0 | Friendly |
| 3 | 8 October 2005 | Stade Ahmadou Ahidjo, Yaoundé, Cameroon | Cameroon | 1–1 | 1–1 | 2006 FIFA World Cup qualification |
| 4 | 11 February 2009 | Cairo International Stadium, Cairo, Egypt | Ghana | 1–0 | 2–2 | Friendly |
| 5 | 15 June 2009 | Free State Stadium, Bloemfontein, South Africa | Brazil | 2–3 | 3–4 | 2009 FIFA Confederations Cup |

== Honours ==
Al Ahly

- Egyptian Premier League: 2004–05, 2005–06, 2006–07, 2010–11
- Egypt Cup: 2006, 2007
- Egyptian Super Cup: 2003, 2005, 2006
- CAF Champions League: 2005, 2006
- CAF Super Cup: 2006, 2007

Egypt

- Africa Cup of Nations: 2006, 2008
