= 2013 Johor Darul Takzim F.C. season =

Johor Darul Takzim
2013 season
- President: Tunku Ismail Idris
- Manager: Wan Nizam Wan Omar
- Head Coach: Fandi Ahmad
- Stadium: Larkin Stadium
- Super League: 3rd
- FA Cup: Runners-up
- Malaysia Cup: Quarter-finals
- Top goalscorer: League: Norshahrul Idlan Talaha (7); All: Norshahrul Idlan Talaha (11)
- Biggest win: 4–2 vs Kelantan (H), 28 September 2013, Malaysia Cup
- Biggest defeat: 1–6 vs Kelantan (A), 5 October 2013, Malaysia Cup
Home colours	Away colours	Third colours

The 2013 season was Johor Darul Takzim Football Club's 41st season in club history, their's 7th season in the Malaysia Super League since its rebranding in 2004, and their 9th in the Malaysian first division. It was also their first season in the league after rebranding from Johor FC.

This is Fandi Ahmad's 1st season with The Southern Tigers. Tunku Ismail Idris has made many changes to the team's structure.

== Season overview ==

Johor Darul Takzim's 2013 starting lineup

The 2013 season was a promising one for Johor Darul Ta'zim, as the club finished third in the Malaysia Super League, reached the final of the Malaysia FA Cup, and progressed to the quarter-finals of the Malaysia Cup. However, the team did not truly shine, despite a large-scale player reshuffle that year.

=== Super League ===
JDT enjoyed a solid campaign, finishing third in the Malaysia Super League with 40 points from 22 matches, recording 11 wins, 7 draws, and 4 defeats, with 32 goals scored and 26 conceded for a goal difference of +6. The campaign ran from January to July, with JDT finishing behind champions Kelantan and runners-up Selangor. Under head coach Fandi Ahmad, the third-place finish represented a strong start for the newly rebranded club and laid the foundation for their future dominance in Malaysian football.

=== FA Cup ===
The Malaysia FA Cup was where JDT came closest to silverware, reaching the final for the first time in their history. After progressing through the early rounds, JDT defeated Pahang in the semi-finals, advancing on the away goals rule after a 2–2 aggregate draw. In the final, played on 11 June at the Bukit Jalil National Stadium, JDT lost 1–0 to Kelantan, denying them their first major trophy.

=== Malaysia Cup ===
The 2013 Malaysia Cup offered JDT another chance at silverware. Placed in Group B alongside PKNS FC, T-Team and FELDA United, JDT progressed through the group stage before reaching the quarter-finals. There, they faced defending champions Kelantan FA. JDT took a 4–2 lead from the first leg, but were eliminated after losing the second leg 1–6 at Kelantan’s Sultan Muhammad IV Stadium, with Kelantan advancing 8–5 on aggregate. The heavy defeat was one of the biggest losses in the club’s early history and meant JDT ended the season without a trophy, despite their strong league finish and appearance in the Malaysia FA Cup final.

== Squads ==
=== First team squad ===
No.	Name	Nationality	Position(s)	Since	Date of birth (age)	Signed from
Goalkeepers
1	Zulfadhli Mohamed	(Malaysia)	GK	2013	19 December 1985 (aged 28)	(Malaysia) Johor FA
22	Al-Hafiz Hamzah	(Malaysia)	GK	2013	15 March 1984 (aged 29)	(Malaysia) USM FC
25	Zamir Selamat	(Malaysia)	GK	2012	24 April 1991 (aged 22)	(Malaysia) Harimau Muda
Defenders
2	Muslim Ahmad	(Malaysia)	CB	2013	6 November 1981 (aged 32)	(Malaysia) Terengganu
6	Izuan Jarudin	(Malaysia)	CB	2010	11 December 1981 (aged 32)	(Malaysia) Kedah
11	Azmi Muslim	(Malaysia)	CB	2013	17 October 1981 (aged 32)	(Malaysia) ATM
7	Aidil Zafuan	(Malaysia)	CB	2013	3 August 1987 (aged 26)	(Malaysia) ATM FA
16	Irfan Ghani	(Malaysia)	CB	2013	17 June 1989 (aged 24)	(Malaysia) Felda United
26	Kamarul Afiq Kamaruddin	(Malaysia)	CB	2013	7 May 1986 (aged 27)	(Malaysia) Sime Darby FC
33	Fazly Mazlan	(Malaysia)	LB	2013	22 December 1993 (aged 20)	(Malaysia) Youths system
34	Nazri Ahmad	(Malaysia)	RB	2013	17 March 1990 (aged 23)	(Malaysia) Felda United
25	Farid Ramli	(Malaysia)	LB	2013	28 April 1987 (aged 26)	(Malaysia) Felda United
5	Ahmad Tharmini Saiban	(Malaysia)	CB	2013	27 August 1978 (aged 35)	(Malaysia) Johor FA
Midfielders
26	K. Thanaraj	(Malaysia)	DM	2013	3 January 1986 (aged 27)	(Malaysia) Sabah
6	Ezrie Shafizie	(Malaysia)	CM	2013	24 February 1986 (aged 27)	(Malaysia) Johor FA
9	Simone Del Nero	(Italy)	LW	2013	4 August 1981 (aged 32)	(Italy) SS Lazio
5	Redzuan Nawi	(Malaysia)	CM	2013	2 June 1986 (aged 27)	(Malaysia) Sabah
12	Azwan Roya	(Malaysia)	LW / RW	2013	25 June 1986 (aged 27)	(Malaysia) Kelantan
8	Safiq Rahim	(Malaysia)	CM	2013	5 July 1987 (aged 26)	(Malaysia) Selangor
21	Jasazrin Jamaluddin	(Malaysia)	CM	2012	3 April 1986 (aged 27)	(Malaysia) Johor FA
27	Andrezinho	(Brazil)	AM	2013	12 February 1986 (aged 27)	(Malaysia) Johor FA
31	Akram Mahinan	(Malaysia)	CM	2013	19 January 1993 (aged 20)	(Malaysia) Harimau Muda B
Forwards
10	Norshahrul Idlan Talaha	(Malaysia)	AM / ST	2013	8 June 1986 (aged 27)	(Malaysia) Kelantan
11	Leonel Núñez	(Argentina)	ST	2013	13 October 1984 (age 42)	(Argentina) Argentinos Juniors
14	Safee Sali	(Malaysia)	AM / ST	2013	28 January 1984 (aged 29)	(Indonesia) Arema Cronous
29	Braulio Nóbrega	(Spain)	CF	2013	18 September 1985 (aged 28)	(Spain) Hércules
17	Zaquan Adha	(Malaysia)	ST	2013	3 August 1987 (age 39)	(Malaysia) ATM
32	Hadin Azman	(Malaysia)	LW / RW / ST	2013	2 July 1994 (aged 18)	(Malaysia) Harimau Muda B
28	Azinee Taib	(Malaysia)	ST	2013	18 July 1990 (aged 23)	(Malaysia) Johor FA
19	Dani Güiza	(Spain)	CF	2013	17 August 1980 (aged 33)	(Spain) Getafe

== Transfer ==
In

No.	Pos.	Name	Age	From
2	DF	(Malaysia) Mohd Muslim Ahmad	23	(Malaysia) Terengganu FA
5	MF	(Malaysia) Mohd Redzuan Nawi	26	(Malaysia) Sabah FA
6	DF	(Malaysia) Kamarul Afiq Kamaruddin	26	(Malaysia) Sime Darby FC
7	DF	(Malaysia) Ahmad Aidil Zafuan Abdul Radzak	25	(Malaysia) ATM FA
8	MF	(Malaysia) Mohd Safiq Rahim	25	(Malaysia) Selangor FA
9	MF	(Italy) Simone Del Nero	31	(Italy) Lazio
9	FW	(Argentina) Leonel Núñez	28	(Argentina) Argentinos Juniors
11	DF	(Malaysia) Mohd Azmi Muslim	26	(Malaysia) ATM FA
12	MF	(Malaysia) Mohd Nurul Azwan Roya	26	(Malaysia) Kelantan FA
14	FW	(Malaysia) Mohd Zaquan Adha Abdul Radzak	25	(Malaysia) ATM FA
16	DF	(Malaysia) Mohd Irfan Abdul Ghani	23	(Malaysia) Felda United FC
17	FW	(Spain) Braulio	27	(Spain) Hércules CF
18	DF	(Malaysia) Mahali Jasuli	23	(Malaysia) Selangor FA
19	FW	(Spain) Dani Güiza	32	(Spain) Getafe CF
20	FW	(Malaysia) Mohd Safee Sali	28	(Indonesia) Arema Cronus
22	GK	(Malaysia) Muhammad Al-Hafiz Hamzah	28	(Malaysia) USM FC
23	MF	(Malaysia) Muhammad Akram Mahinan	19	(Malaysia) Harimau Muda B
29	FW	(Malaysia) Norshahrul Idlan Talaha	26	(Malaysia) Kelantan FA
30	FW	(Malaysia) Muhammad Hadin Azman	18	(Malaysia) Harimau Muda B
—	DF	(Malaysia) Mohd Tuah Iskandar	22	(Malaysia) Johor FA

Out

No.	Pos.	Name	Age	To
1	GK	(Malaysia) Mohd Anis Faron	31	(Malaysia) Felda United F.C.
2	DF	(Malaysia) Mohd Rahman Zabul	31	(Malaysia) Felda United F.C.
3	DF	(Malaysia) Shafizan Hashim	31	(Malaysia) Felda United F.C.
5	DF	(Malaysia) Ismail Suboh	32	(Malaysia) Penang F.C.
11	DF	(Malaysia) Mohd Khairi Kiman	29	(Malaysia) Perak
13	DF	(Brazil) Fernando Abreu	29	(Lithuania) Ekranas
18	DF	(Malaysia) Kaironnisam Sahabudin	34	(Malaysia) Felda United F.C.
4	MF	(Malaysia) Fauzi Saari	31	(Malaysia) Felda United F.C.
7	MF	(Malaysia) Eddy Helmi	34	(Malaysia) Negeri Sembilan
14	MF	(Malaysia) Syazwan Zainon	24	(Malaysia) Felda United F.C.
15	MF	(Malaysia) Riduwan Maon	32	(Malaysia) Felda United F.C.
17	MF	(Malaysia) Azi Shahril Azmi	28	(Malaysia) Felda United F.C.
20	MF	(Malaysia) Syafuan Riduwan	22	(Malaysia) Penang F.C.
8	MF	(Malaysia) Shahrizal Saad	26	(Malaysia) Felda United F.C.
19	FW	(Malaysia) Muhamad Zamri Chin	28	(Malaysia) Sime Darby F.C.
23	FW	(Malaysia) Haris Safwan	31	(Malaysia) Kelantan
25	FW	(Brazil) Arthuro Henrique	31	(Brazil) Pelotas

== Competitions ==
=== Overview ===
Competition	First match	Last match	Starting round	Final position	Record							
Competition	First match	Last match	Starting round	Final position	Pld	W	D	L	GF	GA	GD	Win %
Malaysia Super League	8 January 2013	25 June 2013	Matchday 1	3rd	22	11	7	4	32	26	+6	50.00
Malaysia FA Cup	25 January 2013	29 June 2013	Round of 32	Runners-up	7	3	1	3	8	8	+0	42.86
Malaysia Cup	20 August 2013	5 October 2013	Group stage	Quarter-finals	8	4	0	4	15	18	−3	50.00
Total					37	18	8	11	55	52	+3	48.65

Last updated: 5 October 2013
Source: Competitions

=== Malaysian Super League ===
==== Matches ====
Win Draw Lose

Tuesday 8 January 1	Pahang	3 – 2	Johor Darul Takzim	Darulmakmur Stadium, Kuantan, Pahang
20:45 UTC+08:00	Mohd Fauzi Roslan 49', 72'; R. Surendran 82'		Safiq Rahim 11'; Norshahrul Idlan Talaha 26'

Friday 11 January 2	Johor Darul Takzim	1 – 0	Perak	Tan Sri Dato Hj Hassan Yunos Stadium, Johor Bahru, Johor
20:45 UTC+08:00	Aidil Zafuan 49'

Tuesday 15 January 3	Kelantan	1 – 1	Johor Darul Takzim	Sultan Mohammad IV Stadium, Kota Bharu, Kelantan
20:45 UTC+08:00	Norfarhan Muhammad 37'		Daniel Güiza 63'

Friday 18 January 4	Johor Darul Takzim	2 – 2	ATM	Tan Sri Dato Hj Hassan Yunos Stadium, Johor Bahru, Johor
20:45 UTC+08:00	Daniel Güiza 18'; Norshahrul Idlan Talaha 40'		Amirizwan Taj 7'; Irwan Fadzli 39'

Tuesday 22 January 5	PKNS	1 – 3	Johor Darul Takzim	Shah Alam Stadium, Shah Alam, Selangor
20:45 UTC+08:00	Mohd Faiz Isa 90+1'		Safee Sali 19'; Ahmad Ezrie 61'; Daniel Güiza 87'

Saturday 16 February 6	Johor Darul Takzim	1 – 0	T-Team	Tan Sri Dato Hj Hassan Yunos Stadium, Johor Bahru, Johor
20:45 UTC+08:00	Daniel Güiza 33'

Tuesday 19 February 7	Johor Darul Takzim	2 – 2	LionsXII	Tan Sri Dato Hj Hassan Yunos Stadium, Johor Bahru, Johor
20:45 UTC+08:00	Simone Del Nero 12'; Norshahrul Idlan Talaha 81'		Hariss Harun 4'; Baihakki Khaizan 38'

Friday 22 February 8	Felda United	0 – 0	Johor Darul Takzim	Petaling Jaya Stadium, Kelana Jaya, Selangor
20:45 UTC+08:00

Saturday 2 March 9	Johor Darul Takzim	2 – 1	Negeri Sembilan	Tan Sri Dato Hj Hassan Yunos Stadium, Johor Bahru, Johor
20:45 UTC+08:00	Kamarul Afiq 83'; Nurul Azwan Roya 90+1'		Rashid Mahmud 29'

Saturday 9 March 10	Selangor	4 – 1	Johor Darul Takzim	Shah Alam Stadium, Shah Alam, Selangor
20:45 UTC+08:00	S. Kunanlan 4'; Francis Forkey Doe 32'; Mahali Jasuli 67'; Mohd Amri Yahyah 69'		Norshahrul Idlan Talaha 75'

Saturday 30 March 11	Johor Darul Takzim	3 – 2	Terengganu	Tan Sri Dato Hj Hassan Yunos Stadium, Johor Bahru, Johor
20:45 UTC+08:00	Daniel Güiza 36' (pen), 45+2'; Nurul Azwan Roya 49'		Effa Owona 10', 55'

Friday 12 April 12	Terengganu	0 – 1	Johor Darul Takzim	Sultan Ismail Nasiruddin Shah Stadium, Kuala Terengganu, Terengganu
20:45 UTC+08:00			Norshahrul Idlan Talaha 25'

Friday 19 April 13	Johor Darul Takzim	1 – 0	Pahang	Tan Sri Dato Hj Hassan Yunos Stadium, Johor Bahru, Johor
20:45 UTC+08:00	Leonel Núñez 46'

Saturday 27 April Week 14	Perak	3 – 0	Johor Darul Takzim	Lumut Stadium, Ipoh, Perak
20:45 UTC+08:00	Paulo Rangel 12', 66', 88'

Tuesday 7 May 15	ATM	2 – 0	Johor Darul Takzim	Tuanku Abdul Rahman Stadium, Paroi, Negeri Sembilan
20:45 UTC+08:00	Marlon Alex James 55', 64'

Saturday 11 May 16	Johor Darul Takzim	3 – 1	PKNS	Tan Sri Dato Hj Hassan Yunos Stadium, Johor Bahru, Johor
20:45 UTC+08:00	P. Gunalan 29' o.g. Norshahrul Idlan Talaha 42'; Nurul Azwan Roya 85'		Patrick Wleh 50'

Friday 17 May 17	T-Team	1 – 2	Johor Darul Takzim	Sultan Ismail Nasiruddin Shah Stadium, Kuala Terengganu, Terengganu
20:45 UTC+08:00	Badrul Hisyam Morris 33' pen		Safee Sali 53'; Leonel Núñez 68'

Wednesday 22 May 18	Johor Darul Takzim	2 – 0	Kelantan	Tan Sri Dato Hj Hassan Yunos Stadium, Johor Bahru, Johor
20:45 UTC+08:00	Norshahrul Idlan Talaha 66'; Nurul Azwan Roya 69'

Saturday 22 June 19	LionsXII	1 – 1	Johor Darul Takzim	Jalan Besar Stadium, Singapore
19:45 UTC+08:00	Safuwan Baharudin 83'		Leonel Núñez 10'

Tuesday 25 June 20	Johor Darul Takzim	1 – 1	Felda United	Tan Sri Dato Hj Hassan Yunos Stadium, Johor Bahru, Johor
20:45 UTC+08:00	Hadin Azman 65'		Rudie Ramli 82'

Tuesday 2 July 21	Negeri Sembilan	0 – 2	Johor Darul Takzim	Tuanku Abdul Rahman Stadium, Paroi, Negeri Sembilan
20:45 UTC+08:00			Jasazrin Jamaluddin 26'; Nurul Azwan Roya 70'

Tuesday 25 June 22	Johor Darul Takzim	1 – 1	Selangor	Tan Sri Dato Hj Hassan Yunos Stadium, Johor Bahru, Johor
20:45 UTC+08:00	Leonel Núñez 22'		Francis Forkey Doe 51'

==== League table ====
Pos	Team	Pld	W	D	L	GF	GA	GD	Pts	Qualification or relegation
1	LionsXII (Note: LionsXII was not eligible for any AFC competition spots as they were a foreign side.)	22	12	7	3	32	15	+17	43	
2	Selangor	22	10	10	2	31	17	+14	40	2014 AFC Cup group stage
3	Johor Darul Ta'zim	22	11	7	4	32	26	+6	40	
4	Kelantan	22	10	6	6	32	20	+12	36	2014 AFC Cup group stage (Note: Qualified as 2013 Piala FA winners)
5	Pahang	22	10	5	7	36	32	+4	35	

Source: RSSSF
Rules for classification: 1) points; 2) goal difference; 3) number of goals scored

=== Malaysia FA Cup ===
==== Knockout stage ====
Win Draw Loss

Friday 25 January Rd of 32	Johor Darul Takzim	1 – 0	Perak	Tan Sri Dato Haji Hassan Yunos Stadium, Johor Bahru, Johor
20:45 UTC+08:00	Aidil Zafuan 59'			Referee: Nagor Amir Noor Mohamed

Tuesday 26 February Rd of 16	Kedah	2 – 2 (a.e.t.) (4 – 5 p)	Johor Darul Takzim	Darul Aman Stadium, Alor Setar, Kedah
20:45 UTC+08:00	Khyril Muhymeen 8', 19'		Daniel Guiza 62', 90+1'	Referee: Syed Azhar Syed Kamar (Kuala Lumpur)
	Penalties
	Nelson (penalty scored); Khyril (penalty scored); Shahrul (penalty scored); Baddrol (penalty scored); Shazuan (penalty missed)		Del Nero (penalty scored); Norshahrul (penalty scored); Afiq (penalty scored); Azinee (penalty scored); Guiza (penalty scored)

==== Quarter-finals ====
Saturday 6 April 1st leg	Johor Darul Takzim	1 – 2	Selangor	Tan Sri Dato Haji Hassan Yunos Stadium, Johor Bahru, Johor
20:45 UTC+08:00	Safee Sali 82' (pen.)		Mahali Jasuli 14'; Amri Yahyah 68'	Attendance: 30,000; Referee: Samsudin Ibrahim

Tuesday 16 April 2nd leg	Selangor	1 – 2 (a.e.t.) (2 – 4 p)	Johor Darul Takzim	Shah Alam Stadium, Shah Alam, Selangor
20:45 UTC+08:00	Mahali Jasuli 28'		Leonel Núñez 66', 87'	Attendance: 25,000; Referee: Les Mostia Mohen Mohd Tisan
	Penalties
	Asraruddin (penalty scored); Mahali (penalty missed); Gurusamy (penalty missed); Amri (penalty scored)		Núñez (penalty scored); Safee (penalty scored); Andrezinho (penalty scored); Farid (penalty scored)

==== Semifinals ====
Saturday 25 May 1st leg	Johor Darul Takzim	1 – 0	Pahang	Tan Sri Dato Haji Hassan Yunos Stadium, Johor Bahru, Johor
20:45 UTC+08:00	Leonel Núñez 22'			Attendance: 30,000; Referee: Zamzaidi Katimin

Saturday 1 June 2nd leg	Pahang	2 – 1 (2–2 agg.)	Johor Darul Takzim	National Stadium, Bukit Jalil, Kuala Lumpur
20:45 UTC+08:00	Matías Conti 2', 40'		Andrezinho 48'	Referee: Syed Azhar Syed Kamar

==== Final ====
Saturday 29 June Final	Kelantan	1 – 0	Johor Darul Takzim	National Stadium, Bukit Jalil, Kuala Lumpur
20:45 UTC+08:00	Nor Farhan 15'			Attendance: 90,000; Referee: Syed Azhar Syed Kamar

=== Malaysia Cup ===
==== Group stages ====
Team	Pld	W	D	L	GF	GA	GD	Pts	PKNS	JDT	TTM	FEL
(Selangor) PKNS FC (A)	6	5	0	1	12	1	+11	15		2–0	5–0	2–0
Johor Darul Takzim (A)	6	3	0	3	10	10	0	9	0–2		1–2	1–0
(Terengganu) T–Team FC	6	3	0	3	7	11	−4	9	0–1	2–3		2–1
(Kuala Lumpur) FELDA United FC	6	1	0	5	4	11	−7	3	1–0	2–5	0–1	

Legend: Blue = home team win; Yellow = draw; Red = away team win.
(A) Advance to the 2013 Piala Malaysia quarter finals

20 Ogos 2013 1	PKNS	2 – 0	Johor Darul Takzim	Shah Alam Stadium, Shah Alam
20:45 UTC+08:00	Patrick Wleh 19', 58'; Al-Hafiz (yellow card) 62' (red card)			Attendance: 3,500; Referee: Samsudin Ibrahim

24 Ogos 2013 2	Johor Darul Takzim	1 – 0	Felda United	Tan Sri Dato Haji Hassan Yunos Stadium, Larkin
20:45 UTC+08:00	Safee Sali 76'			Attendance: 10,000; Referee: Zamzaidi Katimin

27 Ogos 2013 3	T-Team	2 – 3	Johor Darul Takzim	Sultan Ismail Nasiruddin Shah Stadium, Kuala Terengganu
20:45 UTC+08:00	Ahmad Syamim 50'; Fazuan Abdullah 78'		Hadin Azman 25'; Safee Sali 29'; Idlan Talaha 62'	Attendance: 1,500; Referee: Syed Azhar Syed Kamar

31 Ogos 2013 4	Johor Darul Takzim	1 – 2	T-Team	Tan Sri Dato Haji Hassan Yunos Stadium, Larkin
20:45 UTC+08:00	Norshahrul Idlan Talaha 43'		Latiff Suhaimi 82'; George Boateng 90+1'	Attendance: 11,000; Referee: Wan Mohd. Tarmizi Wan Ibrahim

17 September 2013 5	Felda United	2 – 5	Johor Darul Takzim	Stadium Mini Temerloh, Temerloh
20:45 UTC+08:00	Rudie Ramli 74', 90+1'		Norshahrul Idlan Talaha 16'; Nurul Azwan Roya 52', 90+6' (pen.); Safiq Rahim 63' (pen.); Hadin Azman 76'	Attendance: 3,500; Referee: Samsudin Ibrahim

21 September 2013 6	Johor Darul Takzim	0 – 2	PKNS	Tan Sri Dato Haji Hassan Yunos Stadium, Larkin
20:45 UTC+08:00			Reeshafiq Alwi 24'; Roman Chmelo 64'	Attendance: 14,000; Referee: Suhaizi Shukri

==== Quarter-finals ====
28 September 2013 1st leg	Johor Darul Takzim	4 – 2	Kelantan	Tan Sri Dato Haji Hassan Yunos Stadium, Larkin, Johor
20:45 UTC+08:00	Jasazrin Jamaluddin 4'; Norshahrul Idlan 21'; Safiq Rahim 39'; Leonel Núñez 81'		Indra Putra 23'; Obinna Nwaneri 50'	Attendance: 30,000

5 Oktober 2013 2nd leg	Kelantan	6 – 1 (8–5 agg.)	Johor Darul Takzim	Sultan Muhammad IV Stadium, Kota Bharu
20:45 UTC+08:00	Nor Farhan Muhammad 19', 62'; Badri Radzi 32'; Obinna Nwaneri 44'; Dickson Nwakaeme 46'; Indra Putra Mahayuddin 89'		Safee Sali 42'	Attendance: 25,000; Referee: Suhaizi Shukri

== Club statistics ==
Includes all competitive matches. The list is sorted by shirt number when total goals are equal.

As of match played 5 October 2013

Rank	Pos.	No.	Player	Super League	FA Cup	Malaysia Cup	Total
1	FW	9	(Malaysia) Norshahrul Idlan Talaha	7	0	4	11
2	FW	14	(Spain) Daniel Güiza	6	2	0	8
3	FW	11	(Argentina) Leonel Núñez	4	3	1	8
4	MF	12	(Malaysia) Nurul Azwan Roya	5	0	2	7
5	FW	14	(Malaysia) Safee Sali	2	1	3	6
6	MF	32	(Malaysia) Hadin Azman	1	0	2	3
7	MF	8	(Malaysia) Safiq Rahim	1	0	2	3
8	DF	7	(Malaysia) Aidil Zafuan	1	1	0	2
9	MF	21	(Malaysia) Jasazrin Jamaluddin	1	0	1	2
10	MF	8	(Malaysia) Ahmad Ezrie Shafizie	1	0	0	1
11	MF	25	(Italy) Simone Del Nero	1	0	0	1
12	DF	26	(Malaysia) Kamarul Afiq	1	0	0	1
13	MF	10	(Brazil) Andrézinho	0	1	0	1
Own Goals				1	0	0	1
TOTALS				32	8	15	55
