= 2013 Selangor FA season =

Selangor FA
2013 season
- Chairman: Tan Sri Dato' Seri Abdul Khalid Ibrahim
- Manager: Irfan Bakti Abu Salim
- Stadium: Shah Alam Stadium
- Malaysia Super League: 2nd
- Malaysia FA Cup: Quarter-finals
- Malaysia Cup: Group stage
- AFC Cup: Round of 16
- Top goalscorer: League: (10 goals); Francis Forkey Doe; All: (15 goals); Francis Forkey Doe
Home colours	Away colours	Third colours

The 2013 season is Selangor FA's 8th season playing in Malaysia Super League. They also competed in two domestic cups, Malaysia FA Cup and Malaysia Cup.

== Players ==
=== First Team Squad ===
No.	Name	Nationality	Position(s)	Since	Signed from
Goalkeepers
1	Fairul Azwan Shahrullai	(Malaysia)	GK	2009	(Selangor) Youth squad
21	Norazlan Razali	(Malaysia)	GK	2011	Kuala Lumpur FA
25	Sharbinee Allawee	(Malaysia)	GK	2013	Terengganu FA
Defenders
3	Fairuz Abdul Aziz	(Malaysia)	LB	2012	(Kuala Lumpur) Sime Darby FC
4	Asraruddin Putra Omar	(Malaysia)	LB / CB	2007	(Selangor) Youth squad
5	Peter Chrappan	(Slovakia)	CB	2013	(Slovakia) FK Dukla Banská Bystrica
6	Mohd Nasriq Baharom	(Malaysia)	CB	2008	(Selangor) Youth squad
7	Adib Aizuddin	(Malaysia)	CB / MF	2012	Johor FA
18	Mahali Jasuli	(Malaysia)	RB / WB	2013	(Malaysia) Harimau Muda A
Midfielders
2	V. Kavi Chelvan	(Malaysia)	CM	2013	PDRM FA
8	Abdul Shukur Jusoh	(Malaysia)	CM / AM	2012	Terengganu FA
9	Solehin Kanasian Abdullah	(Malaysia)	RW	2012	Kelantan FA
12	Bunyamin Umar	(Malaysia)	CM / CB	2009	(Malaysia) UPB-MyTeam FC
13	K. Gurusamy	(Malaysia)	DM / CM	2012	(Malaysia) Harimau Muda
15	Mohd Raimi Mohd Nor	(Malaysia)	LW / AM / RW	2012	(Selangor) Felda United FC
16	S. Kunalan	(Malaysia)	LW / RW	2012	Negeri Sembilan FA
23	S. Veenod	(Malaysia)	DM / CM / RW	2012	(Penang) USM FC
24	Mohd Fitri Shazwan Raduwan	(Malaysia)	LW / RW / CM / AM	2006	(Selangor) Youth squad
Forwards
10	Francis Doe	(Liberia)	ST	2013	Terengganu FA
11	Mohd Afiq Azmi	(Malaysia)	ST	2012	(Kelantan) Kuala Lumpur FA
17	Mohd Amri Yahyah	(Malaysia)	ST	2001	(Selangor) Youth squad
19	Wan Mohd Hoesne	(Malaysia)	ST	2012	Johor FC
22	Ramzul Zahini Adenan	(Malaysia)	ST	2013	Kelantan FA

== Transfers ==
=== Transfers In ===
Pos.	Name	From
GK	(Malaysia) Sharbinee Allawee	(Malaysia) Terengganu FA
DF	(Malaysia) Mahali Jasuli	(Malaysia) Harimau Muda A
DF	(Malaysia) Fairuz Abdul Aziz	(Malaysia) Sime Darby FC
MF	(Malaysia) Shukur Jusoh	(Malaysia) Terengganu FA
MF	(Malaysia) S. Kunanlan	(Malaysia) Negeri Sembilan FA
MF	(Malaysia) S. Veenod	(Malaysia) USM FC
MF	(Malaysia) Mohd Raimi Mohd Nor	(Malaysia) Felda United F.C.
MF	(Malaysia) V. Kavi Chelvan	(Malaysia) Harimau Muda A
FW	(Liberia) Francis Doe	(Malaysia) Terengganu FA
FW	(Malaysia) Afiq Azmi	(Malaysia) Kuala Lumpur FA
FW	(Malaysia) Ramzul Zahini Adenan	(Malaysia) Kelantan FA

=== Transfers Out ===
Pos.	Name	To
GK	(Malaysia) G. Jeevananthan	(Malaysia) ATM FA
MF	(Malaysia) Mohd Hasmarul Fadzir Hassan	(Malaysia) Sime Darby F.C.
DF	(Malaysia) Mohd Razman Roslan	(Malaysia) Pahang FA
DF	(Malaysia) Padathan Gunalan	(Malaysia) PKNS FC
MF	(Malaysia) Safiq Rahim	(Malaysia) Johor Darul Ta'zim F.C.
MF	(Malaysia) Khairul Anuar Khalid	Released
MF	(Malaysia) Azidan Sarudin	(Malaysia) Pahang FA
MF	(Malaysia) Amirul Hadi Zainal	(Malaysia) Pahang FA
MF	(Malaysia) Fazilidin Khalid	Released
MF	(Malaysia) Famirul Asyraf Sayuti	(Malaysia) Sime Darby F.C.
FW	(Malaysia) R. Surendran	(Malaysia) Pahang FA
FW	(Croatia) Boško Balaban	Released

== Competitions ==
=== Overview ===
Competition	First match	Last match	Starting round	Final position	Record							
Competition	First match	Last match	Starting round	Final position	Pld	W	D	L	GF	GA	GD	Win %
Malaysia Super League	8 January 2013	6 July 2013	Matchday 1	2nd	22	10	10	2	31	17	+14	45.45
Malaysia FA Cup	25 January 2013	16 April 2013	Round of 32	Quarter-finals	4	2	1	1	8	5	+3	50.00
Malaysia Cup	20 August 2013	21 September 2013	Group stage	Group stage	6	1	3	2	6	9	−3	16.67
AFC Cup	27 February 2013	15 May 2013	Group stage	Round of 16	7	2	2	3	12	13	−1	28.57
Total					39	15	16	8	57	44	+13	38.46

Last updated: 21 September 2013
Source: Competitions

=== Malaysia Super League ===
Pos	Team	Pld	W	D	L	GF	GA	GD	Pts	Qualification or relegation
1	LionsXII (Note: LionsXII was not eligible for any AFC competition spots as they were a foreign side.)	22	12	7	3	32	15	+17	43	
2	Selangor	22	10	10	2	31	17	+14	40	2014 AFC Cup group stage
3	Johor Darul Ta'zim	22	11	7	4	32	26	+6	40	
4	Kelantan	22	10	6	6	32	20	+12	36	2014 AFC Cup group stage (Note: Qualified as 2013 Piala FA winners)
5	Pahang	22	10	5	7	36	32	+4	35	

Source: RSSSF
Rules for classification: 1) points; 2) goal difference; 3) number of goals scored

==== Results summary ====
Overall								Home						Away					
Pld	W	D	L	GF	GA	GD	Pts	W	D	L	GF	GA	GD	W	D	L	GF	GA	GD
22	10	10	2	31	17	+14	40	8	3	0	21	6	+15	2	7	2	10	11	−1

Source: Soccerway

==== Results by round ====
Round	1	2	3	4	5	6	7	8	9	10	11	12	13	14	15	16	17	18	19	20	21	22
Ground	H	A	A	H	A	H	A	H	A	H	A	H	A	H	H	A	H	A	H	A	H	A
Result	W	L	W	W	D	W	L	D	D	W	D	W	D	D	W	D	D	D	W	W	W	D
Position	5	8	3																			2

Source: Soccerway
A = Away; H = Home; W = Win; D = Draw; L = Loss

==== Selangor FA Results ====
Fixtures and Results of the Malaysia Super League 2013 season.
Win Draw Loss

Malaysia Super League

8 January 1	Selangor	1–0	Negeri Sembilan	Shah Alam, Selangor
20:45 UTC+08:00	Amri Yahyah (yellow card) 19'; Bunyamin Umar (yellow card) 44'; S. Kunanlan (yellow card) 63' (goal) 68'	Report	Fauzi Nan (yellow card) 29'; Nazrin Nawi (yellow card) 66'	Stadium: Shah Alam Stadium; Referee: Suhaizi Shukri (Melaka)

12 January 2	LionsXII (Singapore)	1–0	Selangor	Singapore
19:45 UTC+08:00	Fazrul Nawaz 24'; Safuwan Baharudin (yellow card) 44'; Isa Halim (yellow card) 45'; Hafiz Abu Sujad (yellow card) 48'; Irwan Shah (yellow card) 64'	Report	Asraruddin Putra (yellow card) 84'; Ramez Dayoub (yellow card) 85'	Stadium: Jalan Besar Stadium

15 January 3	Terengganu	1–2	Selangor	Kuala Terengganu, Terengganu
16:45 UTC+08:00	Effa Owona 18'; Ismail Faruqi Asha'ri (yellow card) 55'		S. Kunanlan 7'; Amri Yahyah 16' (yellow card) 58'; Ramez Dayoub (yellow card) 90+1'	Stadium: Sultan Ismail Nasiruddin Shah Stadium; Referee: Zofri Tajudin

19 January 4	Selangor	3–2	Pahang	Shah Alam, Selangor
20:45 UTC+08:00	Amri Yahyah 3', 20'; Fairuz Abdul Aziz (yellow card) 36'; S. Veenod (yellow card) 39'; Forkey Doe (yellow card) 48'; Ramzul Zahini 80'	Report	Fauzi Roslan 24'; Razman Roslan 44' (pen.); R. Gopinathan (yellow card) 69'; R. Surendran (yellow card) 74'; Saiful Nizam (yellow card) 90+2'	Stadium: Shah Alam Stadium

22 January 5	Perak	1–1	Selangor	Ipoh, Perak
20:45 UTC+08:00	Nasir Basharuddin (yellow card) 12'; Failee Mohd Ghazli (yellow card) 68'; Hadi Yahya 81' (pen.)	Report	Adib Aizuddin (yellow card) 19'; Amri Yahyah (yellow card) 36'; Forkey Doe 66' (yellow card) 79'; Ramzul Zahini (yellow card) 69'	Stadium: Lumut Stadium; Referee: Zulkifli Ahmad

15 February 6	Selangor	2–0	Kelantan	Shah Alam, Selangor
20:45 UTC+08:00	Nasriq Baharom (yellow card) 10'; Forkey Doe 13'; Ramez Dayoub 27'; S. Veenod (yellow card) 55'; Norazlan (yellow card) 81'; Shukur Jusoh (yellow card) 85'	Report	Shakir Shaari (yellow card) 41'	Stadium: Shah Alam Stadium; Referee: Mohd Zamzaidi Katimin (Melaka)

19 February 7	ATM (Kuala Lumpur)	2–0	Selangor	Paroi, Negeri Sembilan
20:45 UTC+08:00	Bruno Martelotto 17'; Marlon 90' (pen.)	Report		Stadium: Tuanku Abdul Rahman Stadium; Referee: Suhaizi Shukri (Melaka)

22 February 8	Selangor	0–0	(Selangor) PKNS	Shah Alam, Selangor
20:45 UTC+08:00				Stadium: Shah Alam Stadium

5 March 9	T-Team (Terengganu)	0–0	Selangor	Kuala Terengganu, Terengganu
16:45 UTC+08:00				Stadium: Sultan Ismail Nasiruddin Shah Stadium; Referee: Syed Azhar Syed Kamar

9 March 10	Selangor	4–1	Johor Darul Takzim	Shah Alam, Selangor
20:45 UTC+08:00	S. Kunanlan 4'; Forkey Doe 32'; Mahali 67'; Amri Yahyah 69'	Report	Norshahrul Idlan 75'	Stadium: Shah Alam Stadium; Attendance: 60,980; Referee: Mohd. Zamzaidi Katimin (Melaka)

29 March 11	Felda United (Pahang)	1–1	Selangor	Kelana Jaya, Selangor
16:45 UTC+08:00	Júnior Pereira 25' (pen.)	Report	Amri Yahyah 28'	Stadium: Petaling Jaya Stadium; Referee: Teoh Hee Loon (Melaka)

13 April 12	Selangor	2–0	(Pahang) Felda United	Shah Alam, Selangor
20:45 UTC+08:00	K. Gurusamy 51'; Forkey Doe 82'		Ahmad Fauzi Saari (red card) 89'	Stadium: Shah Alam Stadium; Referee: Suhaimi Mat Hassan (Terengganu)

19 April 13	Negeri Sembilan	0–0	Selangor	Paroi, Negeri Sembilan
20:45 UTC+08:00				Stadium: Tuanku Abdul Rahman Stadium; Referee: Suhaizi Shukri (Melaka)

27 April 14	Selangor	0–0	(Singapore) LionsXII	Shah Alam, Selangor
20:45 UTC+08:00				Stadium: Shah Alam Stadium; Attendance: 5,000; Referee: Nagor Amir Nor Mohamed

22 May 15	Selangor	2–0	Terengganu	Shah Alam, Selangor
20:45 UTC+08:00	Forkey Doe 24', 89'			Stadium: Shah Alam Stadium; Attendance: 3,000; Referee: Teoh Hee Loon

7 May 16	Pahang	2–2	Selangor	Kuantan, Pahang
20:45 UTC+08:00	R. Surendran 39', 90+1'	Report	Forkey Doe 3', 72'	Stadium: Darulmakmur Stadium; Attendance: 17,500; Referee: Syed Azhar Syed Kamar (Kuala Lumpur)

10 May 17	Selangor	1–1	Perak	Shah Alam, Selangor
20:45 UTC+08:00	Raimi Nor 90+1'		Noor Hazrul 19'	Stadium: Shah Alam Stadium; Attendance: 6,000; Referee: Suhaizi Shukri (Melaka)

18 May 18	Kelantan	1–1	Selangor	Kota Bharu, Kelantan
20:45 UTC+08:00	Zairo Anuar 65'		Adam Griffiths 54'	Stadium: Sultan Muhammad IV Stadium; Attendance: 15,000; Referee: Syed Azhar Syed Kamar

21 June 19	Selangor	2–1	(Kuala Lumpur) ATM	Shah Alam, Selangor
20:45 UTC+08:00	Amri Yahyah 40'; K. Gurusamy 90+2'		Bruno Martelotto 45+4' (pen.)	Stadium: Shah Alam Stadium; Attendance: 3,000; Referee: Shamsudin Ibrahim

25 June 20	PKNS (Selangor)	1–2	Selangor	Shah Alam, Selangor
20:45 UTC+08:00	Nizad Ayub 14'		Raimi Mohd Nor 62', 69'	Stadium: Shah Alam Stadium; Attendance: 500; Referee: Azman Jamaludin

2 July 21	Selangor	4–1	(Terengganu) T-Team	Shah Alam, Selangor
20:45 UTC+08:00	Amri Yahyah 11', 69'; Nasriq Baharom 72'; Forkey Doe 83'		Latiff Suhaimi 23'	Stadium: Shah Alam Stadium; Attendance: 2,000; Referee: Syed Azhar

6 July 22	Johor Darul Takzim	1–1	Selangor	Johor Bahru, Johor
20:45 UTC+08:00	Leonel Núñez 22'		Forkey Doe 51'	Stadium: Tan Sri Dato Haji Hassan Yunos Stadium; Attendance: 30,000; Referee: Syed Azhar

==== Results Overview ====
Win Draw Loss

Team	Home score	Away score	Double
(Kuala Lumpur) ATM	2-1	0-2	2-3
(Pahang) FELDA United	2-0	1-1	3-1
Johor Darul Ta'zim	4-1	1-1	5-2
Kelantan	2-0	1-1	3-1
Negeri Sembilan	1-0	0-0	1-0
Pahang	3-2	2-2	5-4
Perak	1-1	1-1	2-2
(Selangor) PKNS	0-0	2-1	2-1
(Singapore) LionsXII	0-0	0-1	0-1
Terengganu	2-0	2-1	4-1
(Terengganu) T–Team	4-1	0-0	4-1

=== Top scorers ===
As of 6 July 2013

Rank	Player	Club	Goals
1	(Saint Vincent and the Grenadines) Marlon Alex James	ATM FA	16
2	(Liberia) Patrick Ronaldinho Wleh	PKNS FC	14
3	(Liberia) Francis Forkey Doe	Selangor FA	10
4	(Brazil) Paulo Rangel	Perak FA	9
5	(Singapore) Shahril Ishak	LionsXII	8
5	(Malaysia) Mohd Fauzi Roslan	Pahang FA	8
5	(Malaysia) Mohd Amri Yahyah	Selangor FA	8
8	(Malaysia) Norshahrul Idlan Talaha	Johor Darul Takzim	7
9	(Spain) Daniel Güiza	Johor Darul Takzim	6
9	(Malaysia) Indra Putra Mahayuddin	Kelantan FA	6
9	(Malaysia) Mohd Nor Farhan Muhammad	Kelantan FA	6
9	(Malaysia) Mohd Badri Mohd Radzi	Kelantan FA	6
9	(Cameroon) Jean-Emmanuel Effa Owona	Terengganu FA	6

=== Malaysia FA Cup ===
==== First round ====
25 January 2013	Selangor	2–2 (a.e.t.) (3–2 p)	ATM	Shah Alam, Selangor
20:45 UTC+08:00	Afiq Azmi 55' 58'		Marlon 8'; Affize Faisal 26'	Stadium: Shah Alam Stadium; Referee: Amirul izwan Yaakob (Perak)
	Penalties
	Mahali (penalty scored); Asraruddin (penalty scored); Raimi (penalty missed); S. Veenod (penalty scored)		Marlon (penalty scored); Reuben (penalty missed); Affize (penalty missed); Bruno (penalty missed)

==== Second round ====
12 February 2013	Sabah	0–3	Selangor	Kota Kinabalu, Sabah
15:45 UTC+08:00		Report	Forkey Doe 44', 87'; Raimi Mohd Nor 51'	Stadium: Likas Stadium

==== Quarter-finals ====
Team 1	Agg.	Team 2	1st leg	2nd leg
Johor Darul Takzim	3 (4) – (2) 3	Selangor	1–2	2–1

6 April 2013	Johor Darul Takzim	1–2	Selangor	Johor Bahru, Johor
20:45 UTC+08:00	Safee Sali 82' (pen.)	Report	Mahali Jasuli 14'; Amri Yahyah 68'	Stadium: Tan Sri Dato Hj Hassan Yunos Stadium; Attendance: 30,000; Referee: Samsudin Ibrahim (Terengganu)

16 April 2013	Selangor	1–2 (a.e.t.) (2–4 p)	Johor Darul Takzim	Shah Alam, Selangor
20:45 UTC+08:00	Mahali Jasuli 28'	Report	Leonel Núñez 66', 87'	Stadium: Shah Alam Stadium; Attendance: 25,000; Referee: Les Mostia Mohen Mohd Tisan (Negeri Sembilan)
	Penalties
	Asraruddin (penalty scored); Mahali (penalty missed); Gurusamy (penalty missed); Amri (penalty scored)		Núñez (penalty scored); Safee (penalty scored); Andrezinho (penalty scored); Farid (penalty scored)

=== AFC Cup ===
==== Group stage ====
Group H

Team	Pld	W	D	L	GF	GA	GD	Pts	KEB	SEL	SG	TPR
(India) East Bengal	6	4	2	0	13	6	+7	14		1–0	4–1	2–1
(Malaysia) Selangor	6	2	2	2	12	11	+1	8	2–2		3–1	3–3
(Vietnam) Sài Gòn Xuân Thành	6	2	2	2	9	12	−3	8	0–0	2–1		2–2
(Singapore) Tampines Rovers	6	0	2	4	12	17	−5	2	2–4	2–3	2–3	

Source: RSSSF

Tiebreakers

- Selangor are ranked ahead of Sài Gòn Xuân Thành on head-to-head record.

Team	Pld	W	D	L	GF	GA	GD	Pts
(Malaysia) Selangor	2	1	0	1	4	3	+1	3
(Vietnam) Sài Gòn Xuân Thành	2	1	0	1	3	4	−1	3

27 February 2013	East Bengal (India)	1–0	(Malaysia) Selangor	Kolkata
15:00 UTC+5:30	Ralte 43'	Report		Stadium: Salt Lake Stadium; Attendance: 3,000; Referee: Tayeb Shamsuzzaman (Bangladesh)

13 March 2013	Selangor (Malaysia)	3–3	(Singapore) Tampines Rovers	Shah Alam
20:45 UTC+8	Doe 8', 54' (pen.): Amri 46'	Report	Đurić 20'; Imran 49'; Yamashita 71'	Stadium: Shah Alam Stadium; Attendance: 1,551; Referee: Kim Sang-Woo (Korea Republic)

3 April 2013	Sài Gòn Xuân Thành (Vietnam)	2–1	(Malaysia) Selangor	Ho Chi Minh City
18:30 UTC+7	Oguwike 45+2', 65'	Report	Doe 64'	Stadium: Thống Nhất Stadium; Attendance: 2,800; Referee: Hettikamkanamge Perera (Sri Lanka)

9 April 2013	Selangor (Malaysia)	3–1	(Vietnam) Sài Gòn Xuân Thành	Shah Alam
20:45 UTC+8	Kubala 9'; Doe 63'; Amri 72'	Report	Oloya 81'	Stadium: Shah Alam Stadium; Attendance: 1,267; Referee: Mohanad Qasim Eesee Sarray (Iraq)

23 April 2013	Selangor (Malaysia)	2–2	(India) East Bengal	Shah Alam
20:45 UTC+8	Shukur 79'; Adib 90+3'	Report	Orji 23'; Ralte 54'	Stadium: Shah Alam Stadium; Attendance: 1,000; Referee: Ng Kai Lam (Hong Kong)

30 April 2013	Tampines Rovers (Singapore)	2–3	(Malaysia) Selangor	Singapore
19:00 UTC+8	Asraruddin 50' (o.g.); Đurić 58'	Report	Taha 28' (o.g.); Amri 45', 76'	Stadium: Jalan Besar Stadium; Attendance: 839; Referee: Yudai Yamamoto (Japan)

Notes

8. The East Bengal v Selangor match was rescheduled from the original date of 6 March 2013 due to India's participation in the 2014 AFC Challenge Cup qualification from 2 to 6 March 2013.

==== Knockout stage ====
15 May 2013	New Radiant (Maldives)	2–0 (a.e.t.)	(Malaysia) Selangor	Malé
16:00 UTC+5	Niyaz 97'; Fasir 105'	Report		Stadium: Galolhu National Stadium; Attendance: 8,600; Referee: Strebre Delovski (Australia)

=== Malaysia Cup ===
==== Group stage ====
Group A

Team	Pld	W	D	L	GF	GA	GD	Pts	ATM	SIM	JOH	SEL
ATM FA (A)	6	2	3	1	15	12	+3	9		3–4	4–1	1–1
(Kuala Lumpur) Sime Darby FC (A)	6	2	3	1	12	9	+3	9	1–1		1–2	3–0
Johor FA	6	1	3	2	9	12	−3	6	3–3	2–2		0–0
Selangor FA	6	1	3	2	6	9	−3	6	2–3	1–1	2–1	

(A) Advance to the 2013 Piala Malaysia quarter finals

20 August 2013	Johor FA	0–0	Selangor FA	Pasir Gudang, Johor
20:45 UTC+8				Stadium: Pasir Gudang Corporation Stadium; Attendance: 5,800; Referee: Suhaizi Shukri (Melaka)

24 August 2013	Selangor FA	2–3	ATM FA	Shah Alam, Selangor
20:45 UTC+8	Amri Yahyah 30'; S. Kunanlan 90+2'		Hairuddin Omar 15'; Fitri Omar 41'; Christie Jayaseelan 47'	Stadium: Shah Alam Stadium; Attendance: 9,000; Referee: Nagor Amir Noor Mohamed (Kuala Lumpur)

27 August 2013	Sime Darby FC (Kuala Lumpur)	3–0	Selangor FA	Majlis Perbandaran Selayang Stadium, Selayang, Selangor
20:45 UTC+8	Karlo Primorac 22', 29'; Fazrul Hazli 72'			Attendance: 3,500; Referee: Mohd Zohri Tajuddin

31 August 2013	Selangor FA	1–1	(Kuala Lumpur) Sime Darby FC	Shah Alam, Selangor
20:45 UTC+8	Forkey Doe 45+2'		Karlo Primorac 80'	Stadium: Shah Alam Stadium; Attendance: 2,000; Referee: Tiong Eng Tai

17 September 2013	ATM FA	1–1	Selangor FA	Selayang, Selangor
20:45 UTC+8	Marlon 38'		Fitri Shazwan 74'	Stadium: Majlis Perbandaran Selayang Stadium; Referee: Mohd Nafeez Abd Wahab (Johor)

21 September 2013	Selangor FA	2–1	Johor FA	Shah Alam, Selangor
20:45 UTC+8	S. Kunanlan 70'; Amri Yahyah 76'		Farid Ideris 48' (pen.)	Stadium: Shah Alam Stadium; Attendance: 1,000; Referee: Mohd Nazmi Nasarudin (Pulau Pinang)
