= List of Malaysian football transfers 2013 second transfer window =

This is a list of Malaysian football transfers for the 2013 second transfer window. Moves featuring Malaysia Super League, Malaysia Premier League and Malaysia FAM Cup club are listed.

2013 second transfer window opened on 8 April and closed on 22 April.

== 2013 Second Transfers ==
All clubs without a flag are Malaysian. Otherwise it will be stated.

=== Transfers ===
Date	Name	Moving from	Moving to	Fee (Note: Transfer fees are gathered from the various and may not be exact)
1 February 2013	(Nigeria) Dickson Nwakaeme	(Vietnam) Sông Lam Nghệ An	Kelantan	Free
1 March 2013	(Malaysia) Fakri Saarani	(Portugal) Atlético	Kelantan	Undisclosed
16 March 2013	(Brazil) Chayene Santos	Kedah	Unattached	N/A
21 March 2013	(Croatia) Alen Guć	(Croatia) NK Solin	Kedah	Free
4 April 2013	(Morocco) Mohamed Borji	Pahang	Unattached	N/A
4 April 2013	(North Macedonia) Nikolce Klečkarovski	Pahang	Unattached	N/A
5 April 2013	(Jamaica) Damion Stewart	(Jamaica) Harbour View	Pahang	Free
8 April 2013	(Togo) Togaba Komlan	(Benin) USS Kraké	Sime Darby	Free
8 April 2013	(Malaysia) Nizaruddin Yusof	PKNS	ATM	Free
8 April 2013	(Malaysia) Ezaidy Khadar	Johor Darul Ta'zim	Johor	Free
8 April 2013	(Malaysia) K. Sathiya	Johor Darul Ta'zim	Johor	Free
8 April 2013	(Malaysia) Zamri Morshidi	PKNS	Sarawak	Free
8 April 2013	(Malaysia) Farid Ramli	Johor	Johor Darul Ta'zim	Free
8 April 2013	(Malaysia) Nazri Ahmad	Johor	Johor Darul Ta'zim	Free
8 April 2013	(Malaysia) Jasazrin Jamaluddin	Johor	Johor Darul Ta'zim	Free
8 April 2013	(Australia) Adam Griffiths	(Australia) Sydney	Selangor	Free
8 April 2013	(Croatia) Goran Perak	Sime Darby	Unattached	N/A
8 April 2013	(Slovakia) Peter Chrappan	Selangor	Unattached	Free
8 April 2013	(Malaysia) Junior Eldstål	(England) Slimbridge	Sarawak	Free
8 April 2013	(Haiti) Leonel Saint-Preux	(Haiti) Victory	Felda United	Free
8 April 2013	(Argentina) Matías Conti	(Argentina) Tristán Suárez	Pahang	Free
8 April 2013	(Malaysia) Azmi Muslim	Johor Darul Ta'zim	Felda United	Free
8 April 2013	(Argentina) Leonel Núñez	(Argentina) Argentinos Juniors	Johor Darul Ta'zim	Free
8 April 2013	(Argentina) Andrezinho	Johor	Johor Darul Ta'zim	Free
8 April 2013	(Italy) Simone Del Nero	(Italy) Lazio	Johor Darul Ta'zim	Free
8 April 2013	(Spain) Dani Güiza	Johor Darul Ta'zim	(Spain) Getafe	Loan return
8 April 2013	(Argentina) Ezequiel Gallegos	(Argentina) Huracán	Johor	Free
8 April 2013	(Guinea) Mandjou Keita	Kelantan	Unattached	N/A
8 April 2013	(Argentina) Emanuel De Porras	Negeri Sembilan	Unattached	N/A
8 April 2013	(Wales) Rhys Weston	Sabah	Unattached	N/A
8 April 2013	(Slovakia) Roman Chmelo	(Czech Republic) 1. HFK Olomouc	PKNS	Free
8 April 2013	(Croatia) Ivan Babić	Sarawak	Unattached	Free
8 April 2013	(Bosnia and Herzegovina) Damir Ibrić	(Romania) Concordia Chiajna	T–Team	Free
8 April 2013	(England) Caleb Folan	T–Team	Unattached	N/A
15 April 2013	(Brazil) Leandro Barbosa	(Thailand) Army United	Negeri Sembilan	Free
16 April 2013	(Bosnia and Herzegovina) Muamer Salibašić	(Bosnia and Herzegovina) Podgrmeč	Sarawak	Free
19 April 2013	(Malaysia) R. Surendran	Pahang	Perak	Free
19 April 2013	(France) Karim Rouani	Perak	Unattached	N/A
1 July 2013	(Malaysia) Nazmi Faiz	(Portugal) Beira-Mar	PKNS	Free
1 July 2013	(Australia) Dimitri Petratos	Kelantan	(Australia) Brisbane Roar	Free

=== Loans ===
Date	Name	Moving from	Moving to
28 February 2013	(Brazil) Paulo Rangel	(Thailand) Muangthong United	Perak

=== Unattached Players ===
Date	Name	New Club
8 April 2013	(France) Abdulfatah Safi	Sabah
8 April 2013	(Cameroon) Joël Tchami	SPA
