= 2013 Malaysia Cup group stage =

The 2013 Malaysia Cup group stage featured 16 teams. The teams were drawn into fourth groups of four, and played each other home-and-away in a round-robin format. The top two teams in each group advanced to the 2013 Piala Malaysia quarter finals.

== Groups ==
The matchdays were 20–31 August, and 17–21 September 2013.

=== Group A ===
Team	Pld	W	D	L	GF	GA	GD	Pts	ATM	SIM	JOH	SEL
ATM FA (A)	6	2	3	1	15	12	+3	9		3–4	4–1	1–1
(Kuala Lumpur) Sime Darby FC (A)	6	2	3	1	12	9	+3	9	1–1		1–2	3–0
Johor FA	6	1	3	2	9	12	−3	6	3–3	2–2		0–0
Selangor FA	6	1	3	2	6	9	−3	6	2–3	1–1	2–1	

(A) Advance to the 2013 Piala Malaysia quarter finals
20 August 2013
20:45

Johor FA	0–0	Selangor FA

Pasir Gudang Corporation Stadium, Pasir Gudang, Johor
Attendance: 5,800
Referee: Suhaizi Shukri (Melaka)
20 August 2013
20:45

ATM FA	3–4	(Kuala Lumpur) Sime Darby FC
Irwan Fadzli 19', 58'; Venice Elphi 76'		Togoba Komlan 3', 22'; Hadzirun 31'; Fazrul Hazli 46'

Majlis Perbandaran Selayang Stadium, Selayang, Selangor
Attendance: 2,000
Referee: Nafeez Abdul Wahab (Johor)

24 August 2013
20:45

Selangor FA	2–3	ATM FA
Amri Yahyah 30'; S. Kunanlan 90+2'		Hairuddin Omar 15'; Fitri Omar 41'; Christie Jayaseelan 47'

Shah Alam Stadium, Shah Alam, Selangor
Attendance: 9,000
Referee: Nagor Amir Noor Mohamed (Kuala Lumpur)
24 August 2013
20:45

Sime Darby FC (Kuala Lumpur)	1–2	Johor FA
Karlo Primorac 14'		Khairul Ismail 25'; Izuan Jarudin 50'

Majlis Perbandaran Selayang Stadium, Selayang, Selangor
Attendance: 2,000
Referee: Suhaimi Mat Hassan (Terengganu)

27 August 2013
20:45

Sime Darby FC (Kuala Lumpur)	3–0	Selangor FA
Karlo Primorac 22', 29'; Fazrul Hazli 72'

Majlis Perbandaran Selayang Stadium, Selayang, Selangor
Attendance: 3,500
Referee: Mohd Zohri Tajuddin
27 August 2013
20:45

Johor FA	3–3	ATM FA
Ezaidy Khadar 44'; Farid Ideris 49'; Hairul Nizam 81'		Shukor Adan 54'; Marlon 74', 79'

Pasir Gudang Corporation Stadium, Pasir Gudang, Johor
Attendance: 8,300
Referee: Wan Mohd Tarmizi Wan Ibrahim (Selangor)

31 August 2013
20:45

ATM FA	4–1	Johor FA
Bruno Martelotto 41', 90+2'; Marlon 76'; Christie Jayaseelan 82'		Rasyid Aya 77'

Majlis Perbandaran Selayang Stadium, Selayang, Selangor
Attendance: 2,000
Referee: Suhaizi Shukri (Melaka)
31 August 2013
20:45

Selangor FA	1–1	(Kuala Lumpur) Sime Darby FC
Forkey Doe 45+2'		Karlo Primorac 80'

Shah Alam Stadium, Shah Alam, Selangor
Attendance: 2,000
Referee: Tiong Eng Tai

17 September 2013
20:45

Johor FA	2–2	(Kuala Lumpur) Sime Darby FC
Farid Ideris 14'; Izuan Jarudin 37'		Azmirul Azmi 43'; Fazrul Hazli 56'

Pasir Gudang Corporation Stadium, Pasir Gudang, Johor
Attendance: 5,500
Referee: Suhaizi Shukri (Melaka)
17 September 2013
20:45

ATM FA	1–1	Selangor FA
Marlon 38'		Fitri Shazwan 74'

Majlis Perbandaran Selayang Stadium, Selayang, Selangor
Referee: Mohd Nafeez Abd Wahab (Johor)

21 September 2013
20:45

Selangor FA	2–1	Johor FA
S. Kunanlan 70'; Amri Yahyah 76'		Farid Ideris 48' (pen.)

Shah Alam Stadium, Shah Alam, Selangor
Attendance: 1,000
Referee: Mohd Nazmi Nasarudin (Pulau Pinang)
21 September 2013
20:45

Sime Darby FC (Kuala Lumpur)	1–1	ATM FA
Asrol Ibrahim 32'		Amirizwan Taj 4'

Majlis Perbandaran Selayang Stadium, Selayang, Selangor
Attendance: 1,000
Referee: Nagor Amir Noor Mohamed (Kuala Lumpur)

=== Group B ===
Team	Pld	W	D	L	GF	GA	GD	Pts	PKNS	JDT	TTM	FEL
(Selangor) PKNS FC (A)	6	5	0	1	12	1	+11	15		2–0	5–0	2–0
Johor Darul Takzim (A)	6	3	0	3	10	10	0	9	0–2		1–2	1–0
(Terengganu) T–Team FC	6	3	0	3	7	11	−4	9	0–1	2–3		2–1
(Kuala Lumpur) FELDA United FC	6	1	0	5	4	11	−7	3	1–0	2–5	0–1	

(A) Advance to the 2013 Piala Malaysia quarter finals
20 August 2013
20:45

FELDA United FC (Kuala Lumpur)	0–1	(Terengganu) T-Team FC
		George Boateng 48'

Temerloh Mini Stadium, Temerloh, Pahang
20 August 2013
20:45

PKNS FC (Selangor)	2–0	Johor Darul Takzim
Patrick Wleh 16', 58'

Shah Alam Stadium, Shah Alam, Selangor
Attendance: 3,500
Referee: Samsudin Ibrahim (Terengganu)

24 August 2013
20:45

Johor Darul Takzim	1–0	(Kuala Lumpur) FELDA United FC
Safee Sali 75'

Tan Sri Dato Haji Hassan Yunos Stadium, Larkin, Johor, Johor
Attendance: 10,000
Referee: Zamzaidi Katimin (Melaka)
24 August 2013
20:45

T-Team FC (Terengganu)	0–1	(Selangor) PKNS FC
		Roman Chmelo 34'

Sultan Ismail Nasiruddin Shah Stadium, Kuala Terengganu, Terengganu
Attendance: 400
Referee: Amirul Izwan Yaakub (Perak)

27 August 2013
20:45

T-Team FC (Terengganu)	2–3	Johor Darul Takzim
Syamim Yahaya 50'; Fazuan Abdullah 78'		Hadin Azman 25'; Safee Sali 29'; Norshahrul Idlan 61'

Sultan Ismail Nasiruddin Shah Stadium, Kuala Terengganu, Terengganu
Attendance: 1,500
Referee: Syed Azhar Syed Kamar (Kuala Lumpur)
27 August 2013
20:45

PKNS FC (Selangor)	2–0	(Kuala Lumpur) FELDA United FC
Patrick Wleh 35', 52'

Shah Alam Stadium, Shah Alam, Selangor
Attendance: 300
Referee: Mohd Nazmi Nasarudin (Pulau Pinang)

31 August 2013
20:45

FELDA United FC (Kuala Lumpur)	1–0	(Selangor) PKNS FC
Emmanuel Mazuwa 41'

Temerloh Mini Stadium, Temerloh, Pahang
Attendance: 900
Referee: Sukri Abd Rahman (Terengganu)
31 August 2013
20:45

Johor Darul Takzim	1–2	(Terengganu) T-Team FC
Norshahrul Idlan 44'		Latiff Suhaimi 81'; George Boateng 90'

Tan Sri Dato Haji Hassan Yunos Stadium, Larkin, Johor, Johor
Attendance: 11,000
Referee: Wan Mohd. Tarmizi Wan Ibrahim (Selangor)

17 September 2013
20:45

FELDA United FC (Kuala Lumpur)	2–5	Johor Darul Takzim
Rudie Ramli 74', 90+1'		Norshahrul Idlan 16'; Nurul Azwan Roya 52', 90+6' (pen.); Safiq Rahim 63' (pen.); Hadin Azman 76'

Temerloh Mini Stadium, Temerloh, Pahang
Attendance: 3,500
Referee: Samsudin Ibrahim (Terengganu)
17 September 2013
20:45

PKNS FC (Selangor)	5–0	(Terengganu) T-Team FC
Roman Chmelo 20', 67'; Patrick Wleh 22', 28'; Nizad Ayub 87'

Shah Alam Stadium, Shah Alam, Selangor
Attendance: 150
Referee: Mohd Zohri Tajuddin

21 September 2013
20:45

Johor Darul Takzim	0–2	(Selangor) PKNS FC
		Reeshafiq Alwi 18'; Roman Chmelo 64'

Tan Sri Dato Haji Hassan Yunos Stadium, Larkin, Johor, Johor
Attendance: 14,000
Referee: Suhaizi Shukri (Melaka)
21 September 2013
20:45

T-Team FC (Terengganu)	2–1	(Kuala Lumpur) FELDA United FC
Syamim Yahaya 23', 62'		Akmal Mohd Noor 87'

Sultan Ismail Nasiruddin Shah Stadium, Kuala Terengganu, Terengganu
Attendance: 200
Referee: Mohd Zohri Tajuddin

=== Group C ===
Team	Pld	W	D	L	GF	GA	GD	Pts	KEL	PAH	NEG	TER
Kelantan FA (A)	6	3	2	1	13	6	+7	11		4–0	2–3	2–0
Pahang FA (A)	6	2	2	2	11	11	0	8	1–1		3–0	1–1
Negeri Sembilan FA	6	2	2	2	11	13	−2	8	1–1	3–5		2–2
Terengganu FA	6	1	2	3	6	11	−5	5	1–3	2–1	0–2	

(A) Advance to the 2013 Piala Malaysia quarter finals
20 August 2013
20:45

Pahang FA	1–1	Kelantan FA
Damion Stewart 85'		Badri Radzi 9'

Darulmakmur Stadium, Kuantan, Pahang
Attendance: 22,000
Referee: Nagor Amir Noor Mohamed (Kuala Lumpur)
20 August 2013
20:45

Terengganu FA	0–2	Negeri Sembilan FA
		Fabio Barbosa 39'; S. Sivanesan 53'

Sultan Ismail Nasiruddin Shah Stadium, Kuala Terengganu, Terengganu
Attendance: 6,000
Referee: Syed Azhar Syed Kamar (Kuala Lumpur)

24 August 2013
20:45

Kelantan FA	2–0	Terengganu FA
Dickson Nwakaeme 11'; Zairo Anuar 73'

Sultan Muhammad IV Stadium, Kota Bharu, Kelantan
Attendance: 15,000
Referee: Nafeez Abdul Wahab (Johor)
24 August 2013
20:45

Negeri Sembilan FA	3–5	Pahang FA
S. Sivanesan 49', 74', 77'		Azamuddin Akil 24'; R. Gopinathan 52', 66'; Matías Conti 63'; Amirul Hadi 83'

Tuanku Abdul Rahman Stadium, Paroi, Seremban, Negeri Sembilan
Attendance: 8,000
Referee: Suhaizi Shukri (Melaka)

27 August 2013
20:45

Negeri Sembilan FA	1–1	Kelantan FA
Fabio Barbosa 60'		Dickson Nwakaeme 41'

Tuanku Abdul Rahman Stadium, Paroi, Seremban, Negeri Sembilan
Attendance: 10,000
Referee: Kamal Ahmad (Kuala Lumpur)
27 August 2013
20:45

Pahang FA	1–1	Terengganu FA
Matías Conti 15'		Ashaari Shamsuddin 8'

Darulmakmur Stadium, Kuantan, Pahang
Attendance: 12,000
Referee: Nafeez Abdul Wahab (Johor)

31 August 2013
20:45

Terengganu FA	2–1	Pahang FA
Effa Owona 63'; Khairul Ramadhan 90+4'		Azamuddin Akil 69'

Sultan Ismail Nasiruddin Shah Stadium, Kuala Terengganu, Terengganu
Attendance: 6,500
Referee: Nagor Amir Noor Mohamed (Kuala Lumpur)
31 August 2013
20:45

Kelantan FA	2–3	Negeri Sembilan FA
Indra Putra 37'; Fakri Saarani 49'		S. Sivanesan 13'; Fabio Barbosa 58', 77'

Sultan Muhammad IV Stadium, Kota Bharu, Kelantan
Attendance: 20,000
Referee: Syed Azhar Syed Kamar (Kuala Lumpur)

17 September 2013
20:45

Pahang FA	3–0	Negeri Sembilan FA
Matías Conti 52'; R. Gopinathan 71'; Azidan Sarudin 85'

Darulmakmur Stadium, Kuantan, Pahang
Attendance: 9,000
Referee: Mohd Nazmi Nasarudin (Pulau Pinang)
17 September 2013
20:45

Terengganu FA	1–3	Kelantan FA
Ashaari Shamsuddin 75'		Hasmizan 28' (o.g.); Indra Putra 57'; Badri Radzi 86'

Sultan Ismail Nasiruddin Shah Stadium, Kuala Terengganu, Terengganu
Attendance: 9,500
Referee: Syed Azhar Syed Kamar (Kuala Lumpur)

21 September 2013
20:45

Kelantan FA	4–0	Pahang FA
Indra Putra 20'; Dickson Nwakaeme 67', 82', 89'

Sultan Muhammad IV Stadium, Kota Bharu, Kelantan
Attendance: 20,000
Referee: Syed Azhar Syed Kamar (Kuala Lumpur)
21 September 2013
20:45

Negeri Sembilan FA	2–2	Terengganu FA
Fabio Barbosa 20'; Nazrin Nawi 71'		Effa Owona 18'; Ashaari Shamsuddin 88'

Tuanku Abdul Rahman Stadium, Paroi, Seremban, Negeri Sembilan
Attendance: 10,000
Referee: Wan Mohd Tarmizi Wan Ibrahim (Selangor)

=== Group D ===
Team	Pld	W	D	L	GF	GA	GD	Pts
Sarawak FA (A)	6	3	1	2	13	5	+8	10
(Singapore) LionsXII (A)	6	3	1	2	9	7	+2	10
Perak FA	6	2	1	3	6	11	−5	7
Kedah FA	6	1	3	2	5	10	−5	6

(A) Advance to the 2013 Piala Malaysia quarter finals
20 August 2013
19:45

LionsXII (Singapore)	2–2	Kedah FA
Shahril Ishak 11'; Shahfiq Ghani 66'		Alen Guć 24', 90+3' (pen.)

Jalan Besar Stadium, Kallang, Singapore
Attendance: 6,834
Referee: Wan Mohd Tarmizi Wan Ibrahim (Selangor)
20 August 2013
20:45

Perak FA	2–1	Sarawak FA
Paulo Rangel 65', 90'		Joseph Kalang 31'

Perak Stadium, Ipoh, Perak
Attendance: 10,000
Referee: Zamzaidi Katimin (Melaka)

24 August 2013
20:45

Sarawak FA	2–1	(Singapore) LionsXII
Shakir Hamzah 11' (o.g.); Joseph Kalang 71' (pen.)		Safuwan Baharudin 78'

Sarawak State Stadium, Kuching, Sarawak
Attendance: 14,000
Referee: Syed Azhar Syed Kamar (Kuala Lumpur)
24 August 2013
20:45

Kedah FA	1–1	Perak FA
Alen Guć 90+2' (pen.)		Khairul Asyraf 59'

Darul Aman Stadium, Alor Setar, Kedah
Attendance: 21,000
Referee: Mohd Nazmi Nasarudin (Pulau Pinang)

27 August 2013
20:45

Kedah FA	0–0	Sarawak FA

Darul Aman Stadium, Alor Setar, Kedah
Attendance: 8,400
Referee: Nagor Amir Noor Mohamed (Kuala Lumpur)
27 August 2013
20:45

Perak FA	1–0	(Singapore) LionsXII
Azlan Ismail 9'

Perak Stadium, Ipoh, Perak
Attendance: 20,000
Referee: Suhaizi Shukri (Melaka)

31 August 2013
19:45

LionsXII (Singapore)	2–1	Perak FA
Hariss Harun 62'; Safuwan Baharudin 85'		Noor Hazrul 66'

Jalan Besar Stadium, Kallang, Singapore
Attendance: 7,016
Referee: Nafeez Abdul Wahab (Johor)
31 August 2013
20:45

Sarawak FA	4–0	Kedah FA
Zamri Morshidi 55'; Muamer Salibašić 63'; Bobby Gonzales 75', 78'

Sarawak State Stadium, Kuching, Sarawak
Attendance: 15,000
Referee: Amirul Izwan Yaakub (Perak)

17 September 2013
20:45

Perak FA	0–1	Kedah FA
		Nelson 90+2'

Perak Stadium, Ipoh, Perak
Attendance: 30,000
Referee: Wan Mohd Tarmizi Wan Ibrahim (Selangor)
18 September 2013
19:45

LionsXII (Singapore)	1–0	Sarawak FA
Fazrul Nawaz 63'

Jalan Besar Stadium, Kallang, Singapore
Attendance: 6,834
Referee: Nagor Amir Noor Mohamed (Kuala Lumpur)

21 September 2013
20:45

Sarawak FA	6–1	Perak FA
Khairi Kiman 7' (o.g.); Bobby Gonzales 8'; Muamer Salibašić 45', 60', 74'; Zamri Morshidi 58'		Yong Kuong Yong 24'

Sarawak State Stadium, Kuching, Sarawak
Attendance: 20,000
Referee: Samsudin Ibrahim (Terengganu)
21 September 2013
20:45

Kedah FA	1–3	(Singapore) LionsXII
Alen Guć 44'		Hariss Harun 23'; Baihakki Khaizan 37'; Hafiz Sujad 65'

Darul Aman Stadium, Alor Setar, Kedah
Attendance: 24,000
Referee: Nafeez Abdul Wahab (Johor)

=== Goals ===
As of 26 October 2013

9 goals

- (Saint Vincent and the Grenadines) Marlon Alex James (ATM FA)

8 goals

- (Argentina) Matías Conti (Pahang FA)

7 goals

- (Liberia) Patrick Wleh (PKNS FC)
- (Bosnia and Herzegovina) Muamer Salibašić (Sarawak FA)

6 goals

- (Nigeria) Dickson Nwakaeme (Kelantan FA)

5 goals

- (Malaysia) Indra Putra Mahayuddin (Kelantan FA)
- (Malaysia) Mohd Badri Radzi (Kelantan FA)
- (Brazil) Fabio Barbosa (Negeri Sembilan FA)
- (Malaysia) S. Sivanesan (Negeri Sembilan FA)
- (Malaysia) Mohd Azamuddin Akil (Pahang FA)

4 goals

- (Malaysia) Norshahrul Idlan Talaha (Johor Darul Takzim FC)
- (Croatia) Alen Guć (Kedah FA)
- (Slovakia) Roman Chmelo (PKNS FC)
- (Malaysia) Bobby Gonzales (Sarawak FA)
- (Croatia) Karlo Primorac (Sime Darby FC)

3 goals

- (Malaysia) D. Christie Jayaseelan (ATM FA)
- (Malaysia) Mohd Safee Sali (Johor Darul Takzim FC)
- (Malaysia) Mohd Farid Ideris (Johor FA)
- (Malaysia) Mohd Nor Farhan Muhammad (Kelantan FA)
- (Malaysia) R. Gopinathan (Pahang FA)
- (Malaysia) Mohd Fazrul Hazli Mohd Kadri (Sime Darby FC)
- (Malaysia) Mohd Ashaari Shamsuddin (Terengganu FA)
- (Malaysia) Ahmad Syamim Yahaya (T-Team FC)

2 goals

- (Argentina) Bruno Martelotto (ATM FA)
- (Malaysia) Irwan Fadzli Idrus (ATM FA)
- (Malaysia) Rudie Ramli (FELDA United F.C.)
- (Malaysia) Hadin Azman (Johor Darul Takzim FC)
- (Malaysia) Mohd Nurul Azwan Roya (Johor Darul Takzim FC)
- (Malaysia) Mohd Safiq Rahim (Johor Darul Takzim FC)
- (Malaysia) Mohd Izuan Jarudin (Johor FA)
- (Malaysia) Ahmad Fakri Saarani (Kelantan FA)
- (Nigeria) Obinna Nwaneri (Kelantan FA)
- (Singapore) Hafiz Abu Sujad (LionsXII)
- (Singapore) Hariss Harun (LionsXII)
- (Singapore) Safuwan Baharudin (LionsXII)
- (Brazil) Paulo Rangel (Perak FA)
- (Malaysia) Joseph Kalang Tie (Sarawak FA)
- (Malaysia) Zamri Morshidi (Sarawak FA)
- (Malaysia) Mohd Amri Yahyah (Selangor FA)
- (Malaysia) S. Kunanlan (Selangor FA)
- (Malaysia) Mohd Asrol Ibrahim (Sime Darby FC)
- (Togo) Togaba Kontiwa Komlan (Sime Darby FC)
- (Cameroon) Jean-Emmanuel Effa Owona (Terengganu FA)
- (Netherlands) George Boateng (T-Team FC)

1 goals

- (Malaysia) Amirizwan Taj Tajuddin (ATM FA)
- (Malaysia) Hairuddin Omar (ATM FA)
- (Malaysia) Mohd Fitri Omar (ATM FA)
- (Malaysia) Muhammad Shukor Adan (ATM FA)
- (Malaysia) Venice Elphi Danny Kaya (ATM FA)
- (Democratic Republic of the Congo) Emmanuel Mazuwa (FELDA United F.C.)
- (Malaysia) Mohd Akmal Mohd Noor (FELDA United F.C.)
- (Malaysia) Jasazrin Jamaluddin (Johor Darul Takzim FC)
- (Argentina) Leonel Núñez (Johor Darul Takzim FC)
- (Malaysia) Mohd Ezaidy Khadar (Johor FA)
- (Malaysia) Mohd Hairul Nizam Haniff (Johor FA)
- (Malaysia) Mohd Khairul Ismail (Johor FA)
- (Malaysia) Mohd Rasyid Aya (Johor FA)
- (Chile) Nelson San Martín (Kedah FA)
- (Malaysia) Zairo Anuar Zalani (Kelantan FA)
- (Singapore) Baihakki Khaizan (LionsXII)
- (Singapore) Fazrul Nawaz (LionsXII)
- (Singapore) Madhu Mohana (LionsXII)
- (Singapore) Shahril Ishak (LionsXII)
- (Singapore) Shahfiq Ghani (LionsXII)
- (Malaysia) Mohd Nazrin Mohd Nawi (Negeri Sembilan FA)
- (Jamaica) Damion Stewart (Pahang FA)
- (Malaysia) Azidan Sarudin (Pahang FA)
- (Malaysia) Mohd Amirul Hadi Zainal (Pahang FA)
- (Malaysia) Mohd Fauzi Roslan (Pahang FA)
- (Malaysia) Azlan Ismail (Perak FA)
- (Malaysia) Khairul Asyraf Shaizah (Perak FA)
- (Malaysia) Yong Kuong Yong (Perak FA)
- (Malaysia) Mohd Noor Hazrul Mohd Mustafa (Perak FA)
- (Malaysia) Mohd Lot Abu Hassan (PKNS FC)
- (Malaysia) Mohd Nizad Ayub (PKNS FC)
- (Malaysia) Muhd Khairu Azrin Khazali (PKNS FC)
- (Malaysia) Reeshafiq Alwi (PKNS FC)
- (Malaysia) Mohd Shahrol Saperi (Sarawak FA)
- (Liberia) Francis Forkey Doe (Selangor FA)
- (Malaysia) Mohd Fitri Shazwan Raduwan (Selangor FA)
- (Malaysia) Azmirul Azmi (Sime Darby FC)
- (Malaysia) Hadzirun Che Hamid (Sime Darby FC)
- (Malaysia) Khairul Ramadhan Zauwawi (Terengganu FA)
- (Malaysia) Abdul Latiff Suhaimi (T-Team FC)
- (Malaysia) Fazuan Abdullah (T-Team FC)

=== Own goal ===
- (Malaysia) Mohd Khairi Kiman from (Perak FA) score for Sarawak FA
- (Malaysia) Hasmizan Kamarodin from (Terengganu FA) score for Kelantan FA
- (Singapore) Hariss Harun from (LionsXII) score for ATM FA
- (Singapore) Shakir Hamzah from (LionsXII) score for Sarawak FA
