= 2013 Malaysia Cup final =

- Event: 2013 Malaysia Cup
Kelantan	Pahang
(Kelantan)	(Pahang)
0	1
- Date: 03 November 2013
- Venue: Shah Alam Stadium, Shah Alam
- Man of the Match: Azamuddin Akil (Pahang)
- Referee: Nagor Amir Noor Mohamed (Kuala Lumpur)
- Attendance: 85,000
- Weather: Rain; 24 °C (75 °F)

The 2013 Malaysia Cup final was a football match which was played on 3 November 2013, to determine the winners of the 2013 Malaysia Cup. It was the final of the 87th edition of the Malaysia Cup, competition organised by the Football Association of Malaysia.

The final was played between Kelantan and Pahang.

== Venue ==
The final was held at the Shah Alam Stadium in Selangor.

== Road to final ==
Note: In all results below, the score of the finalist is given first.

Kelantan				Round	Pahang			
Opponent	Result			Group stage	Opponent	Result		
Kelantan	1–1 (H)			Matchday 1	Pahang	1–1 (A)		
Terengganu	2–0 (H)			Matchday 2	Negeri Sembilan	3–5 (A)		
Negeri Sembilan	1–1 (A)			Matchday 3	Terengganu	1–1 (H)		
Negeri Sembilan	2–3 (H)			Matchday 4	Terengganu	1–2 (A)		
Terengganu	3–1 (A)			Matchday 5	Negeri Sembilan	3–0 (H)		
Pahang	4–0 (H)			Matchday 6	Kelantan	0–4 (A)		
Group C winner: Team / Pld / W / D / L / GF / GA / GD / Pts; Kelantan / 6 / 3 / 2 / 1 / 13 / 6 / +7 / 11; Pahang / 6 / 2 / 2 / 2 / 11 / 11 / 0 / 8; Negeri Sembilan / 6 / 2 / 2 / 2 / 11 / 13 / −2 / 8; Terengganu / 6 / 1 / 2 / 3 / 6 / 11 / −5 / 5				Final standings	Group C winner: Team / Pld / W / D / L / GF / GA / GD / Pts; Kelantan / 6 / 3 / 2 / 1 / 13 / 6 / +7 / 11; Pahang / 6 / 2 / 2 / 2 / 11 / 11 / 0 / 8; Negeri Sembilan / 6 / 2 / 2 / 2 / 11 / 13 / −2 / 8; Terengganu / 6 / 1 / 2 / 3 / 6 / 11 / −5 / 5			
Opponent	Agg.	1st leg	2nd leg	Knockout phase	Opponent	Agg.	1st leg	2nd leg
Johor Darul Takzim	8–5	2–4 (A)	6–1 (H)	Quarter-finals	(Selangor) PKNS	5–3	3–2 (H)	2–1 (A)
ATM	4–3	2–1 (A)	2–2 (H)	Semi-finals	Sarawak	4–2	3–1 (H)	1–1 (A)

== Match details ==
Sunday, 03 November
20:45 UTC+08:00

Kelantan	0 – 1	Pahang
	Report	Matías Conti 59'

Shah Alam Stadium, Shah Alam
Attendance: 85,000
Referee: Nagor Amir Noor Mohamed (Kuala Lumpur)

Kelantan	Pahang

GK	19	(Malaysia) Khairul Fahmi Che Mat
DF	24	(Malaysia) Zairul Fitree Ishak
DF	6	(Malaysia) Mohd Farisham Ismail
DF	5	(Malaysia) Nik Shahrul Azim Abdul Halim
DF	2	(Malaysia) Azizi Matt Rose
MF	10	(Malaysia) Mohd Nor Farhan Muhammad
MF	8	(Malaysia) Mohd Shakir Shaari
MF	7	(Malaysia) Zairo Anuar Zalani		(substituted off) 60'
MF	16	(Malaysia) Mohd Badhri Mohd Radzi (c)		(substituted off) 82'
FW	22	(Nigeria) Dickson Nwakaeme	(yellow card) 85'
FW	23	(Malaysia) Indra Putra Mahayuddin
Substitutes
GK	21	(Malaysia) Muhammad Syazwan Yusoff
DF	25	(Malaysia) K. Nanthakumar
DF	17	(Malaysia) Mohd Rizal Fahmi Abdul Rosid
DF	30	(Malaysia) Tuan Muhammad Faim Tuan Zainal Abidin
MF	13	(Malaysia) Mohd Faiz Subri		(substituted on) 82'
FW	9	(Malaysia) Ahmad Fakri Saarani		(substituted on) 60'
FW	22	(Malaysia) Mohd Haris Safwan Mohd Kamal
Coach
(Croatia) Bojan Hodak

GK	1	(Malaysia) Mohd Khairul Azhan Mohd Khalid
DF	2	(Malaysia) Jalaluddin Jaafar (c)	(yellow card) 74'	(substituted off) 82'
DF	3	(Malaysia) Mohd Razman Roslan
DF	4	(Jamaica) Damion Stewart	(yellow card) 25'
DF	20	(Malaysia) Mohd Shahrizan Salleh	(yellow card) 63'
MF	7	(Malaysia) Surendran Ravindran		(substituted off) 45'
MF	21	(Malaysia) Mohd Hafiz Kamal
MF	5	(Malaysia) Mohd Amirul Hadi Zainal
MF	24	(Malaysia) Gopinathan Ramachandra		(substituted off) 89'
FW	9	(Argentina) Matías Conti
FW	12	(Malaysia) Mohd Azamuddin Md Akil
Substitutes
GK	23	(Malaysia) Mohd Nasril Nourdin
DF	3	(Malaysia) Mohd Saiful Nizam Miswan		(substituted on) 82'
DF	17	(Malaysia) Mohd Zaiza Zainal Abidin
MF	8	(Malaysia) Azidan Sarudin
MF	10	(Malaysia) Abdul Malik Mat Ariff
MF	11	(Malaysia) Mohd Faizol Hussien		(substituted on) 89'
FW	11	(Malaysia) Mohd Fauzi Roslan		(substituted on) 45'
Coach
(Malaysia) Dollah Salleh

Assistant referees:
Mohd Kamil Yumin (Kuala Lumpur)
Muhd Mu'azi Zainal Abidin (Kuala Lumpur)
Fourth official:
Samsudin Ibrahim (Kuala Lumpur)

Match rules

- 90 minutes.
- 30 minutes of extra time if necessary.
- Penalty shoot-out if scores still level.
- Seven named substitutes.
- Maximum of three substitutions.
