= 2013 Malaysia FA Cup final =

- Event: 2013 Malaysia FA Cup
Kelantan	Johor Darul Takzim
(Kelantan)	(Johor)
1	0
- Date: 29 June 2013
- Venue: National Stadium, Bukit Jalil, Kuala Lumpur
- Man of the Match: Badhri Radzi (Kelantan)
- Referee: Syed Azhar Syed Kamar (Kuala Lumpur)
- Attendance: 90,000

The 2013 Malaysia FA Cup final was a football match which was played on 29 June 2013, to determine the champion of the 2013 Malaysia FA Cup. It was the final of the 24th edition of the Malaysia FA Cup, competition organised by the Football Association of Malaysia.

The final was played between Kelantan and Johor Darul Takzim. Kelantan won 1–0 to win their second Malaysia FA Cup title for the second year in row.

== Venue ==
The final was held at the National Stadium, Bukit Jalil in Kuala Lumpur.

== Road to final ==
Opponent	Agg.	1st leg	2nd leg	Knockout phase	Opponent	Agg.	1st leg	2nd leg
Bye				Round of 32	Perak	1–0 (H) (one-leg match)		
(Selangor) PKNS	4–2 (H) (one-leg match)			Round of 16	Kedah	1–1 (aet) (4–5 p) (A) (one-leg match)		
Sarawak	4–1	2–1 (H)	0–2 (A)	Quarterfinals	Selangor	3(4)–(2)3	1–2 (H)	2–1 (A)
Terengganu	6–5	4–1 (H)	2–4 (aet) (A)	Semifinals	Pahang	2–2 (a)	1–0 (H)	2–1 (A)

== Match details ==
Saturday, 29 June
20:45 UTC+08:00

Kelantan	1 – 0	Johor Darul Ta'zim
Nor Farhan Muhammad 15'	Report

National Stadium, Bukit Jalil, Kuala Lumpur
Attendance: 100,000
Referee: Syed Azhar Syed Kamar (Kuala Lumpur)

Kelantan FA	Johor Darul Ta'zim

GK	19	(Malaysia) Khairul Fahmi
DF	15	(Malaysia) Daudsu Jamaluddin	(yellow card) 77'	(substituted off) 85'
DF	5	(Malaysia) Nik Shahrul Azim
DF	4	(Nigeria) Obinna Nwaneri
DF	2	(Malaysia) Azizi Matt Rose
MF	10	(Malaysia) Nor Farhan Muhammad
MF	8	(Malaysia) Shakir Shaari
MF	16	(Malaysia) Badhri Radzi (c)
MF	24	(Malaysia) Zairul Fitree		(substituted off) 42'
FW	9	(Malaysia) Fakri Saarani		(substituted off) 72'
FW	22	(Nigeria) Dickson Nwakaeme
Substitutes
GK	21	(Malaysia) Syazwan Yusoff
DF	14	(Malaysia) Zamri Ramli
DF	6	(Malaysia) Farisham Ismail		(substituted on) 85'
DF	17	(Malaysia) Rizal Fahmi Rosid
MF	7	(Malaysia) Zairo Anuar		(substituted on) 72'
MF	13	(Malaysia) Faiz Subri
FW	23	(Malaysia) Indra Putra Mahayuddin		(substituted on) 42'
Coach
(Croatia) Bojan Hodak

GK	1	(Malaysia) Al-Hafiz Hamzah
DF	19	(Malaysia) Nazri Ahmad
DF	5	(Malaysia) Tharmini Saiban	(yellow card) 70'
DF	3	(Malaysia) Kamarul Afiq (c)
DF	25	(Malaysia) Farid Ramli	(yellow card) 58'
MF	12	(Malaysia) Nurul Azwan Roya
MF	10	(Brazil) Andrézinho		(substituted off) 37'
MF	8	(Malaysia) Safiq Rahim		(substituted off) 45'
MF	21	(Malaysia) Jasazrin Jamaluddin
FW	9	(Malaysia) Norshahrul Idlan Talaha	(yellow card) 95'
FW	14	(Malaysia) Safee Sali		(substituted off) 18'
Substitutes
GK	22	(Malaysia) Zulfadhli Mohamed
DF	6	(Malaysia) Redzuan Nawi
DF	16	(Malaysia) Tuah Iskandar
DF	24	(Malaysia) Muslim Ahmad
MF	13	(Malaysia) Ezrie Shafizie		(substituted on) 45'
MF	23	(Malaysia) K. Thanaraj		(substituted on) 37'
FW	11	(Argentina) Leonel Núñez		(substituted on) 18'
Coach
(Singapore) Fandi Ahmad

Assistant referees:
M. Sivanesan (Malaysia)
Mohd Sabri Mat Daud (Malaysia)
Fourth official:
Lismotia Mohem Mohd Tisan (Malaysia)

Match rules

- 90 minutes.
- 30 minutes of extra time if necessary.
- Penalty shoot-out if scores still level.
- Seven named substitutes.
- Maximum of three substitutions.
