= Raimi Nor =

Malaysian footballer

Personal information
- Full name: Mohd Raimi bin Md Nor
- Date of birth: 4 April 1986 (age 40)
- Place of birth: Malacca, Malaysia
- Height: 1.73 m (5 ft 8 in)
- Position: Full-back

Youth career
- 2006: Selangor

Senior career*
Years	Team	Apps	(Gls)
2006–2007	Selangor		
2007–2010	KL PLUS		
2010–2011	Sime Darby	14	(4)
2011–2012	Felda United		
2012–2017	Selangor		
2014	→ Felda United (loan)		
2018	Penang		
2019	Melaka United		
2020	Kuala Lumpur		
- * Club domestic league appearances and goals as of 27 July 2018

Mohd Raimi bin Md Nor (born 4 April 1986) is a Malaysian footballer who plays as a defender.

== Club career ==
=== Penang ===
On 29 December 2017, Raimi signed a contract with Malaysia Premier League side Penang. He made his debut for Penang in a 3–1 defeat against UiTM FC on 1 February 2018.

== Career statistics ==
=== Club ===
As of 27 July 2018

Club	Season	League		Cup		League Cup		Continental		Total	
Club	Season	Apps	Goals	Apps	Goals	Apps	Goals	Apps	Goals	Apps	Goals
Selangor	2013	0	3	0	0	0	0	–	–	0	0
Selangor	2014	3	0	1	0	0	0	2	0	6	0
Selangor	2015	13	0	2	0	10	0	–	–	25	0
Selangor	2016	16	0	2	0	4	0	2	0	24	0
Selangor	2017	15	1	1	0	6	0	–	–	22	1
Selangor	Total	0	0	0	0	0	0	0	0	0	0
Penang	2018	18	1	2	0	0	0	–	–	20	1
Penang	Total	18	1	2	0	0	0	0	0	20	1
Career total		0	0	0	0	0	0	0	0	0	0
