= Andrezinho =

Andrezinho may refer to:

- Andrezinho (footballer, born 1975), Azerbaijan international footballer
- Andrezinho (footballer, born 1979), Brazilian footballer
- Andrezinho (footballer, born 1981), Brazilian footballer
- Andrezinho (footballer, born 1982), Brazilian footballer
- Andrezinho (footballer, born 1983), Brazilian footballer
- Andrezinho (footballer, born 1985), Brazilian footballer
- Andrezinho (footballer, born 1986), Brazilian footballer
- Andrezinho (footballer, born 1995), Portuguese footballer
- Andrezinho, Brazilian musician formerly with the band Molejo
