= Amirul Hadi =

Malaysian footballer

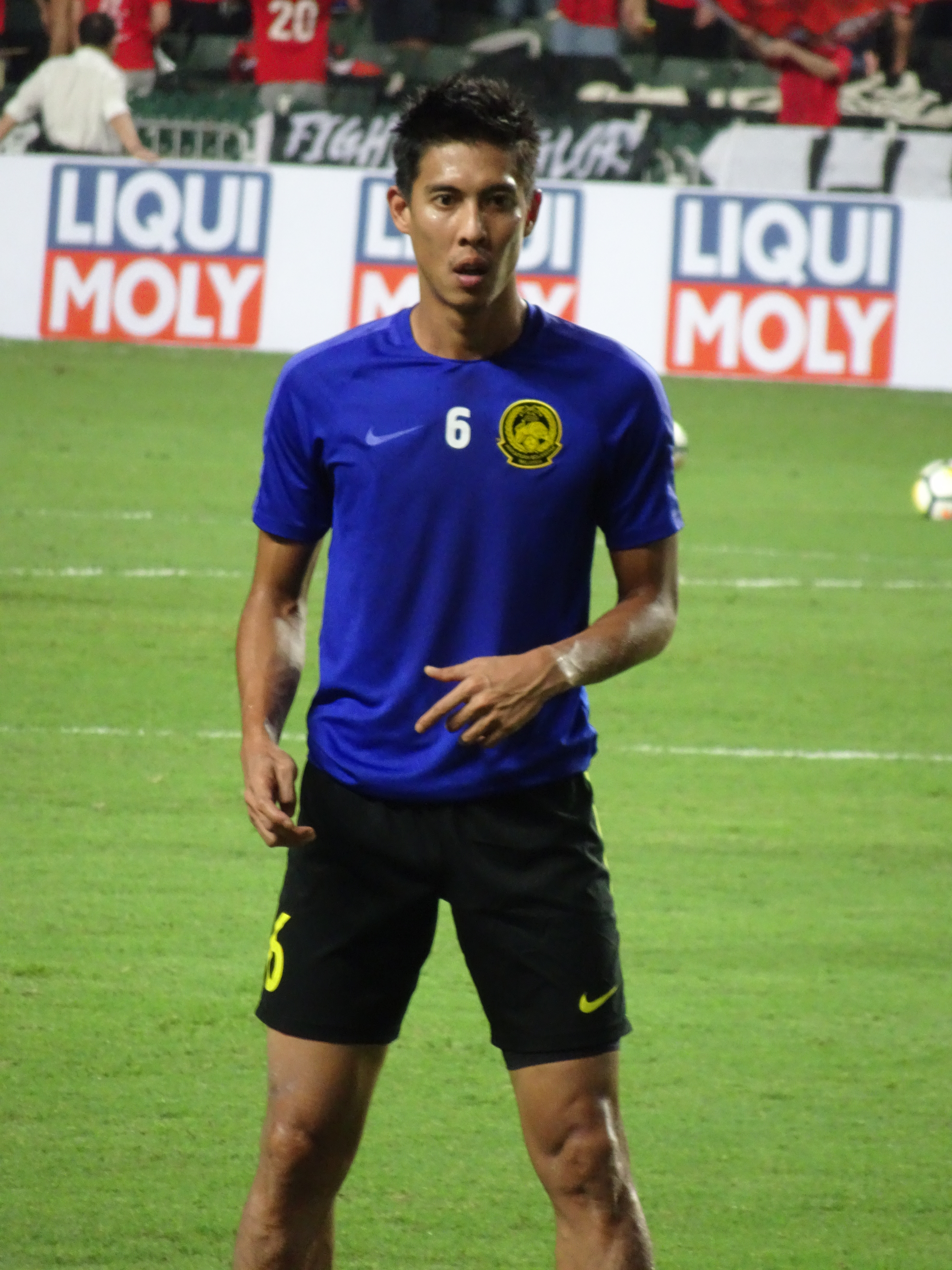
- Amirul with Malaysia in 2016

Personal information
- Full name: Muhammad Amirul Hadi bin Zainal
- Date of birth: 27 May 1986 (age 40)
- Place of birth: Alor Gajah, Malacca, Malaysia
- Height: 1.83 m (6 ft 0 in)
- Position: Midfielder

Youth career
- 2002–2006: Selangor

Senior career*
Years	Team	Apps	(Gls)
2006–2012	Selangor	39	(4)
2013	Pahang	23	(3)
2014–2018	Johor Darul Ta'zim	67	(7)
2018	→ Johor Darul Ta'zim II (loan)	6	(0)
2019	Johor Darul Ta'zim II	19	(0)

International career^{‡}
2007–2009	Malaysia U23		
2007–2017	Malaysia	39	(7)

Managerial career
- 2020–: Johor Darul Ta'zim II (assistant coach)
Medal record
Men's Football
Representing Malaysia
ASEAN Championship
Winner	2010
Malaysia U23
SEA Games
First place	2009 Vientiane	Football
Merdeka Tournament
Winner	2007
- * Club domestic league appearances and goals as of 12 July 2019 ‡ National team caps and goals as of 5 September 2017

Muhammad Amirul Hadi bin Zainal (born 27 May 1986) is a Malaysian former professional footballer who last plays for Malaysian club Johor Darul Ta'zim II and the Malaysian national team as a central midfielder. Born in Alor Gajah, Malacca but raised in Klang, Selangor, Amirul is the son of former top Selangor player in 1990s, Zainal Nordin.

== Club career ==
=== Pahang FA ===
Amirul Hadi joined Pahang from Selangor ahead of the 2013 season. For Pahang, he played as a central midfielder. He was man of the match as Pahang took a one-goal lead in the quarter-final of the 2013 Malaysia Cup against PKNS, and on 3 November 2013, he assisted Pahang to defeat Kelantan 1–0 in the Cup Final which ended the team's 21-year drought in the Cup. In the 2013 Malaysia Super League season, he scored once in 19 appearances. After reviving his career with Pahang FA and helped them to lift the long sought trophy, he decided to not extend the contract with them for the upcoming season as he joined Johor Darul Takzim FC later for the new challenge down south.

== International career ==
Amirul has represented the Malaysian under-23 side for the 2008 Olympic Games qualifier. He scored a brilliant solo goal against the Hong Kong under-23 teams in the qualifier.

Amirul made his senior debut against Bahrain in 2010 FIFA World Cup qualifier. Malaysia lost their first match of the qualifier 4–1 before drawing 0–0 at Shah Alam. Amirul also represented the Malaysia XI squad against Chelsea F.C. at Shah Alam Stadium on 29 July 2008. He was one of Malaysia's more impressive player in the match after getting three attempts on goal but failed to score. The Malaysia XI eventually lost 0–2. However, Chelsea coach Luiz Felipe Scolari praised the Malaysia XI for giving a good fight against his team.

Amirul scored his first international senior goal against Myanmar in 2008 Merdeka Tournament. He was also part of the 2009 Southeast Asian Games winning squad.

In November 2010, Amirul was called up to the Malaysia national squad by coach K. Rajagopal for the 2010 AFF Suzuki Cup. Amirul scored in the final group game against Laos in a 5–1 victory. Malaysia won the 2010 AFF Suzuki Cup title for the first time in their history.

On 14 July 2016, Amirul announced his retirement from international football after 34 'A' international caps and 7 'A' international goals.

== International goals ==
=== Under-23 ===
#	Date	Venue	Opponent	Score	Result	Competition
1.	7 March 2007	Mongkok Stadium, Hong Kong	Hong Kong	0–1	0–1 (W)	2008 Summer Olympics qualification
2.	3 December 2007	Nakhon Ratchasima, Thailand	Laos	1–0	4–0 (W)	2007 SEA Games
3.	8 December 2007	Nakhon Ratchasima, Thailand	Singapore	1–0	1–1 (D)	2007 SEA Games
4.	2 December 2009	New Laos National Stadium, Vientiane	Timor-Leste	10–0	11–0 (W)	2009 SEA Games

=== Senior team ===
#	Date	Venue	Opponent	Score	Result	Competition
1.	23 October 2008	National Stadium, Bukit Jalil	Myanmar	4–0	4–0 (W)	2008 Merdeka Tournament
2.	11 November 2008	Thuwunna Stadium, Myanmar	Myanmar	2–1	4–1 (L)	2008 Myanmar Grand Royal Challenge Cup
3.	29 November 2008	MBPJ Stadium	Singapore	2–2	2–2 (D)	Friendly Match
4.	11 September 2009	MBPJ Stadium	Lesotho	4–0	5–0 (W)	Friendly Match
5.	7 December 2010	Gelora Sriwijaya Stadium	Laos	3–1	5–1 (W)	2010 AFF Suzuki Cup
6.	9 February 2011	Shah Alam Stadium	Hong Kong	2–0	2–0 (W)	Friendly Match
7.	18 June 2011	Sultan Mohammad IV Stadium	Myanmar	1–0	2–0 (W)	Friendly Match

== Honours ==
=== Club ===
Selangor

- Malaysia Super League: 2009, 2010
- Malaysia Charity Shield: 2009, 2010
- Malaysia FA Cup: 2009

Pahang

- Malaysia Cup: 2013

Johor Darul Takzim

- Malaysia Super League: 2014, 2015, 2016, 2017
- Malaysia Charity Shield: 2015, 2016
- Malaysia Cup: 2017; runner-up 2014
- Malaysia FA Cup: 2016
- AFC Cup: 2015

Johor Darul Ta'zim II F.C.

- Malaysia Challenge Cup(1): 2019

=== International ===
- Pestabola Merdeka: 2007
- SEA Games : 2009 Gold
- AFF Championship : 2010
