= Irwan Fadzli =

Malaysian former footballer

Personal information
- Full name: Irwan Fadzli bin Idrus
- Date of birth: 2 June 1981 (age 45)
- Place of birth: Kedah, Malaysia
- Height: 1.76 m (5 ft 9 in)
- Positions: Left-back; centre-back

Team information
- Current team: Kedah Darul Aman (assistant coach)

Senior career*
Years	Team	Apps	(Gls)
2000–2003	Kedah	?	(?)
2004–2007	Pahang	?	(?)
2007–2008	UPB-MyTeam	?	(?)
2009–2010	KL PLUS	?	(5)
2011	Negeri Sembilan	20	(0)
2012–2014	ATM	63	(3)
2015	Negeri Sembilan	1	(0)
2018	Felda United	0	(0)

International career
2001–2004	Malaysia U-23	15	(1)
2001–2012	Malaysia	25	(1)

Managerial career
- 2024–: Kedah U23 (assistant)
Medal record
Men's football
Representing Malaysia
Malaysia U23
SEA Games
Bronze medal – third place	2003 Vietnam	Football
Silver medal – second place	2001 Malaysia	Football
- * Club domestic league appearances and goals

Irwan Fadzli bin Idrus (born 2 June 1981) is a Malaysian former footballer who played as a defender. He is a former member of the Malaysian national team.

He has played for the Malaysian under 23 squad for the 2001 and 2003 SEA Games, 2002 Asian Games, 2004 Olympic qualifier, and participate in 2002 Tiger Cup and 2007 ASEAN Football Championship with the national senior team. He also part of Malaysia XI squad in a match against Chelsea on 29 July 2008 at Shah Alam Stadium where Malaysia XI eventually lost 0-2.

== Career statistics ==
=== International ===
Appearances and goals by national team and year
National team	Year	Apps	Goals
Malaysia	2001	5	1
Malaysia	2002	2	0
Malaysia	2003	6	1
Malaysia	2004	4	0
Malaysia	2005	–	
Malaysia	2006	–	
Malaysia	2007	3	0
Malaysia	2008	4	0
Malaysia	2009	–	
Malaysia	2010	–	
Malaysia	2011	–	
Malaysia	2012	1	0
Total		25	1

Scores and results list Malaysia's goal tally first, score column indicates score after each Fadzli goal.

List of international goals scored by Irwan Fadzli
No.	Date	Venue	Opponent	Score	Result	Competition
1	25 March 2001	Grand Hamad Stadium, Doha, Qatar	Palestine	3–2	4–3	2002 FIFA World Cup qualification

== Honours ==
=== International ===
Malaysia U-23

- SEA Games: (silver) silver 2001; (bronze) bronze 2003
