= 2013 Malaysia Cup =

2013 Piala Malaysia
Piala Malaysia

Tournament details
- Country: Malaysia; Singapore
- Teams: 16

Final positions
- Champions: Pahang FA (3rd title)
- Runner-up: Kelantan FA

Tournament statistics
- Matches played: 61
- Goals scored: 194 (3.18 per match)
- Top goal scorer(s): 9 goals Marlon Alex James; Matías Conti

Awards
- Best player: Azamuddin Akil

The 2013 Malaysia Cup (Malay: Piala Malaysia 2013) was the 87th season of Malaysia Cup and began on 20 August with a preliminary round and finished on 3 November 2013 with the final, held at Shah Alam Stadium. A total of 16 teams took part in the competition. The teams were divided into four groups, each containing four teams. The group leaders and runners-up teams in the groups after six matches qualified to the quarterfinals.

Kelantan were the defending champions, having beaten ATM 3–2 in last season's final. For the second time, a Singaporean team, LIONSXII, also newly minted 2013 Malaysian Super League champions, participated in this competition.

This 87th edition ended with Pahang winning the title after beating Kelantan 1–0, with a goal scored by Matías Conti.

== Format ==
In this competition, the top 10 teams from 2013 Malaysia Super League is joined by the top 4 teams from 2013 Malaysia Premier League. The remaining 2 teams from 2013 Malaysia Super League and the team who finished 5th and 6th place in the 2013 Malaysia Premier League will battle it out in the playoffs for the remaining 2 spots. The teams will be drawn into four groups of four teams. Voting took place on 27 July at TM Convention Centre, Menara Telekom, Jalan Pantai Baharu, Kuala Lumpur.

== Round and draw dates ==
The draws are held at TM Convention Centre in Kuala Lumpur on 27 July 2013 .

Phase	Round	Draw date	First leg	Second leg
Play-off	Play-off round		10 July 2013	
Group stage	Matchday 1	27 July 2013 (Kuala Lumpur)	20 August 2013	
Group stage	Matchday 2	27 July 2013 (Kuala Lumpur)	24 August 2013	
Group stage	Matchday 3	27 July 2013 (Kuala Lumpur)	27 August 2013	
Group stage	Matchday 4	27 July 2013 (Kuala Lumpur)	31 August 2013	
Group stage	Matchday 5	27 July 2013 (Kuala Lumpur)	17 September 2013	
Group stage	Matchday 6	27 July 2013 (Kuala Lumpur)	21 September 2013	
Knockout phase	Quarter-finals	27 July 2013 (Kuala Lumpur)	27 & 28 September 2013	4 & 5 October 2013
Knockout phase	Semi-finals	27 July 2013 (Kuala Lumpur)	18 & 19 October 2013	25 & 26 October 2013
Knockout phase	Final	27 July 2013 (Kuala Lumpur)	3 November 2013 at Shah Alam Stadium	

== Play-off ==
10 July 2013
21:45 UTC+08

FELDA United (Kuala Lumpur)	1 – 0	(Kuala Lumpur) POS Malaysia
Shafizan Hashim 64' (pen.)	Report

Bukit Jalil National Stadium, Kuala Lumpur

10 July 2013
21:45 UTC+08

Negeri Sembilan	4 – 0	Sabah
Nazrin Nawi 10', 15' (pen.), 84'; Fabio Leandro 51'	Report

Shah Alam Stadium, Shah Alam
Referee: Nagor Amir

== Seeding ==
Pot 1	Pot 2	Pot 3	Pot 4
(Singapore) LionsXII; Selangor (Johor) Darul Takzim FC; Kelantan FA	Pahang; ATM; Perak (Selangor) PKNS	Terengganu; T-Team; Sarawak (Kuala Lumpur) Sime Darby	Kedah; Johor (Kuala Lumpur) FELDA United; Negeri Sembilan

== Group stage ==
=== Group A ===
Team	Pld	W	D	L	GF	GA	GD	Pts	ATM	SIM	JOH	SEL
ATM FA (A)	6	2	3	1	15	12	+3	9		3–4	4–1	1–1
(Kuala Lumpur) Sime Darby FC (A)	6	2	3	1	12	9	+3	9	1–1		1–2	3–0
Johor FA	6	1	3	2	9	12	−3	6	3–3	2–2		0–0
Selangor FA	6	1	3	2	6	9	−3	6	2–3	1–1	2–1	

(A) Advance to the 2013 Piala Malaysia quarter finals

=== Group B ===
Team	Pld	W	D	L	GF	GA	GD	Pts	PKNS	JDT	TTM	FEL
(Selangor) PKNS FC (A)	6	5	0	1	12	1	+11	15		2–0	5–0	2–0
Johor Darul Takzim (A)	6	3	0	3	10	10	0	9	0–2		1–2	1–0
(Terengganu) T–Team FC	6	3	0	3	7	11	−4	9	0–1	2–3		2–1
(Kuala Lumpur) FELDA United FC	6	1	0	5	4	11	−7	3	1–0	2–5	0–1	

(A) Advance to the 2013 Piala Malaysia quarter finals

=== Group C ===
Team	Pld	W	D	L	GF	GA	GD	Pts	KEL	PAH	NEG	TER
Kelantan FA (A)	6	3	2	1	13	6	+7	11		4–0	2–3	2–0
Pahang FA (A)	6	2	2	2	11	11	0	8	1–1		3–0	1–1
Negeri Sembilan FA	6	2	2	2	11	13	−2	8	1–1	3–5		2–2
Terengganu FA	6	1	2	3	6	11	−5	5	1–3	2–1	0–2	

(A) Advance to the 2013 Piala Malaysia quarter finals

=== Group D ===
Team	Pld	W	D	L	GF	GA	GD	Pts
Sarawak FA (A)	6	3	1	2	13	5	+8	10
(Singapore) LionsXII (A)	6	3	1	2	9	7	+2	10
Perak FA	6	2	1	3	6	11	−5	7
Kedah FA	6	1	3	2	5	10	−5	6

(A) Advance to the 2013 Piala Malaysia quarter finals

== Knockout stage ==
=== Bracket ===
Quarterfinals
D2	(Singapore) LionsXII	1	1	2
A1	ATM FA	0	4	4
C1	Kelantan FA	2	6	8
B2	Johor Darul Takzim	4	1	5
C2	Pahang FA	3	2	5
B1	(Selangor) PKNS FC	2	1	3
A2	(Kuala Lumpur) Sime Darby FC	0	1	1
D1	Sarawak FA	0	3	3

Semifinals
A1	ATM FA	1	2	3
C1	Kelantan FA	2	2	4
C2	Pahang FA	3	1	4
D1	Sarawak FA	1	1	2

Final
C1	Kelantan FA	0
C2	Pahang FA	1

== Quarterfinals ==
The first legs were played on 27 & 28 September 2013, and the second legs were played on 4 & 5 October 2013.

Team 1	Agg.	Team 2	1st leg	2nd leg
Pahang FA	5–3	PKNS FC	3–2	2–1
LionsXII	2–4	ATM FA	1–0	1–4
Sime Darby FC	1–3	Sarawak FA	0–0	1–3
Johor Darul Takzim FC	5–8	Kelantan FA	4–2	1–6

=== First leg ===
27 September 2013
20:45 UTC+8

Pahang FA	3–2	(Selangor) PKNS FC
Conti 1', 51', 58'		Patrick Wleh 37'; Lot Abu Hassan 38'

Darul Makmur Stadium, Kuantan, Pahang
Attendance: 21,500
Referee: Nafeez Abdul Wahab (Johor)

28 September 2013
19:45 UTC+8

LionsXII (Singapore)	1–0	ATM FA
Madhu 40'

Jalan Besar Stadium, Kallang, Singapore
Attendance: 7,464
Referee: Nagor Amir Noor Mohamed (Kuala Lumpur)

28 September 2013
20:45 UTC+8

Johor Darul Takzim	4–2	Kelantan FA
Jasazrin 4'; Norshahrul 21'; Safiq 39'; Núñez 81'		Indra 23'; Obinna 50'

Tan Sri Dato Haji Hassan Yunos Stadium, Larkin, Johor
Attendance: 30,000
Referee: Samsudin Ibrahim (Terengganu)

28 September 2013
20:45 UTC+8

Sime Darby FC (Kuala Lumpur)	0–0	Sarawak FA

Majlis Perbandaran Selayang Stadium, Selayang, Selangor
Attendance: 4,500
Referee: Wan Mohd Tarmizi Wan Ibrahim (Selangor)

=== Second leg ===
4 October 2013
20:45 UTC+8

ATM FA	4–1	(Singapore) LionsXII
Hariss 23' (o.g.); Marlon 33', 75', 83'		Hafiz Sujad 49'

Majlis Perbandaran Selayang Stadium, Selayang, Selangor
Attendance: 8,000
Referee: Nafeez Abdul Wahab (Johor)

ATM FA won 4–2 on aggregate.

4 October 2013
20:45 UTC+8

PKNS FC (Selangor)	1–2	Pahang FA
Khairu Azrin 67'		Conti 29' (pen.); Azamuddin 60'

Shah Alam Stadium, Shah Alam, Selangor
Attendance: 10,000
Referee: Amirul Izwan Yaakub (Perak)

Pahang FA won 5–3 on aggregate.

5 October 2013
20:45 UTC+8

Sarawak FA	3–1	(Kuala Lumpur) Sime Darby FC
Salibašić 27', 55', 85'		Asrol 6'

Sarawak Stadium, Kuching, Sarawak
Attendance: 22,000
Referee: Mohd. Zamzaidi Katimin (Melaka)

Sarawak FA won 3–1 on aggregate.

5 October 2013
20:45 UTC+8

Kelantan FA	6–1	Johor Darul Takzim
Farhan 19', 62'; Badri 32'; Obinna 44'; Nwakaeme 46'; Indra 89'		Safee 42'

Sultan Muhammad IV Stadium, Kota Bharu, Kelantan
Attendance: 25,000
Referee: Suhaizi Shukri (Melaka)

Kelantan FA won 8–5 on aggregate.

== Semi-finals ==
The first leg will be played on 18 & 19 October while the second leg will be played on 25 & 26 October.

Team 1	Agg.	Team 2	1st leg	2nd leg
ATM FA	3–4	Kelantan FA	1–2	2–2
Pahang FA	4–2	Sarawak FA	3–1	1–1

=== First leg ===
18 October 2013
20:45 UTC+8

ATM FA	1–2	Kelantan FA
Christie 19'		Badri 15'; Farhan 79'

Majlis Perbandaran Selayang Stadium, Selayang, Selangor
Attendance: 15,000
Referee: Nagor Amir Noor Mohamed (Kuala Lumpur)

19 October 2013
20:45 UTC+8

Pahang FA	3–1	Sarawak FA
Azamuddin 30', 33'; Conti 38'		Shahrol 40'

Darul Makmur Stadium, Kuantan, Pahang
Attendance: 40,000
Referee: Wan Mohd Tarmizi Wan Ibrahim (Selangor)

=== Second leg ===
25 October 2013
20:45 UTC+8

Kelantan FA	2–2	ATM FA
Fakri 82'; Badri 85'		Marlon 18', 35'

Sultan Muhammad IV Stadium, Kota Bharu, Kelantan
Attendance: 25,000
Referee: Nafeez Abdul Wahab (Johor)

Kelantan FA won 4–3 on aggregate.

26 October 2013
20:45 UTC+8

Sarawak FA	1–1	Pahang FA
Bobby 32'		Fauzi 74'

Sarawak Stadium, Kuching, Sarawak
Attendance: 22,000
Referee: Shamsudin Ibrahim (Terengganu)

Pahang FA won 4–2 on aggregate.

== Final ==
The Final will be played on 3 Nov 2013 at Shah Alam Stadium, Shah Alam.

3 November 2013
20:45 UTC+8

Kelantan FA	0–1	Pahang FA
		Matías Conti 59'

Shah Alam Stadium, Shah Alam, Selangor
Attendance: 80,119
Referee: Nagor Amir Noor Mohamed (Kuala Lumpur)

== Winners ==
2013 Piala Malaysia Winner

Pahang
3rd Title

== Statistics ==
=== Top Scorer ===
Rank	Player	Club	Goals
1	(Saint Vincent and the Grenadines) Marlon Alex James	ATM FA	9
1	(Argentina) Matías Conti	Pahang FA	9
3	(Liberia) Patrick Ronaldinho Wleh	(Selangor) PKNS FC	7
3	(Bosnia and Herzegovina) Muamer Salibašić	Sarawak FA	7
5	(Nigeria) Dickson Nwakaeme	Kelantan FA	6
6	(Malaysia) Indra Putra Mahayuddin	Kelantan FA	5
6	(Malaysia) Mohd Badri Radzi	Kelantan FA	5
6	(Brazil) Fabio Leandro Barbosa	Negeri Sembilan FA	5
6	(Malaysia) S. Sivanesan	Negeri Sembilan FA	5
6	(Malaysia) Mohd Azamuddin Akil	Pahang FA	5
11	(Malaysia) Norshahrul Idlan Talaha	Johor Darul Takzim FC	4
11	(Croatia) Alen Guć	Kedah FA	4
11	(Slovakia) Roman Chmelo	(Selangor) PKNS FC	4
11	(Malaysia) Bobby Gonzales	Sarawak FA	4
11	(Croatia) Karlo Primorac	(Kuala Lumpur) Sime Darby FC	4

=== Own goals ===
Rank	Player	For	Club	Own Goal
1	(Singapore) Hariss Harun	ATM FA	LionsXII	1
1	(Singapore) Shakir Hamzah	Sarawak FA	LionsXII	1
1	(Malaysia) Mohd Khairi Kiman	Sarawak FA	Perak FA	1
1	(Malaysia) Hasmizan Kamarodin	Kelantan FA	Terengganu FA	1

=== Hat-tricks ===
Player	For	Against	Result	Date
(Malaysia) S. Sivanesan	Negeri Sembilan FA	Pahang FA	3-5	24 August 2013
(Nigeria) Dickson Nwakaeme	Kelantan FA	Pahang FA	4-0	21 September 2013
(Bosnia and Herzegovina) Muamer Salibašić	Sarawak FA	Perak FA	6-1	21 September 2013
(Argentina) Matías Conti	Pahang FA	PKNS FC	3-2	27 September 2013
(Saint Vincent and the Grenadines) Marlon Alex James	ATM FA	LionsXII	4-1	4 October 2013
(Bosnia and Herzegovina) Muamer Salibašić	Sarawak FA	Sime Darby FC	3-1	5 October 2013
