= Ahmad Tharmini Saiban =

Malaysian footballer

Personal information
- Date of birth: 27 August 1978 (age 48)
- Place of birth: Teluk Sengat, Johor, Malaysia
- Height: 1.80 m (5 ft 11 in)
- Position: Center back

Senior career*
Years	Team	Apps	(Gls)
2000–2004	Melaka FA	26	(0)
2005–2007	Selangor FA	28	(3)
2008	Sabah FA	18	(0)
2009–2010	ATM FA	31	(3)
2011–2012	PKNS FC	16	(0)
2012–2013	Johor FA	8	(0)
2013–2014	Johor Darul Takzim FC	19	(0)

International career^{‡}
2004	Malaysia	2	(0)
- * Club domestic league appearances and goals as of 8 November 2013 ‡ National team caps and goals as of 11:17, 8 April 2021 (UTC)

Ahmad Tharmini Bin Saiban (born 27 August 1978), is a Malaysian footballer who last plays as a defender for Malaysian Super League club, Johor Darul Takzim FC. Ahmad Tharmini has spent most of his career at Melaka FA before moving on to several Super League and Premier League clubs.

== Club career ==
=== Melaka FA ===
Ahmad Tharmini has spent most of his career at Melaka FA. He finished over two seasons with the Malaccan teams.

=== Selangor FA ===
Ahmad Tharmini moved to Selangor FA in 2005 and has since played for the Red Giants squad for over a season before moving on to another Premier league club.

=== PKNS FC ===
For the 2011 campaign, Ahmad Tharmini joined another Selangor club, PKNS FC. He helped PKNS FC gain promotion to the Super League in his first season with the club. He kept a clean sheet for his team on the last match day of the season over defeat of Johor FA and gave the team a 12-point unassailable lead over their nearest challenger, Sarawak FA with 3 games remaining. However, he spent his career for only a season with the club.

=== Johor FA ===
After a previous successful season for the veteran defender, he joined with his local side club, Johor FA. He started off the 2012 season with 1-4 defeat to ATM FA before he regained his fine form mid-way through the season for the club to cruise them to top 4 in the league behind third place, Sime Darby FC with 4-points behind second place, Pahang FA thus miss-out a place for the play-offs.

=== Johor Darul Takzim FC ===
Ahmad Tharmini joined big spending club, Johor Darul Takzim FC for 2013 season. He helped to steady the backline along with JDT acquisition of national player, Aidil Zafuan.

== International career ==
Ahmad Tharmini has represented Malaysia back in 2004 under the ex-head coach, Bertalan Bicskei. He also played in 2005 Islamic Solidarity Games when the national team reached quarter-final.

== Style of play ==
Ahmad Tharmini played most of his career as a central defender. He was known for his positioning in defensive line and quick on man-to-man marking to stop the opposing players.

== Honours ==
Selangor

- Malaysia Cup: 2005
- Malaysia FA Cup: 2005

JDT

- Malaysia Super League: 2014
