= R. Surendran =

Malaysian footballer (born 1982)

R. Surendren
Personal information
- Full name: Surendren A/L Rasiah
- Date of birth: 26 October 1982 (age 44)
- Place of birth: Taiping, Perak, Malaysia
- Height: 1.75 m (5 ft 9 in)
- Position: Striker

Youth career
- 1996-1998: Perak

Senior career*
Years	Team	Apps	(Gls)
1999–2001	Perak TKN	-	(-)
2002–2007	Perak	40	(18)
2008–2012	Selangor	34	(16)
2011	Pahang	14	(2)
2013–2014	ATM FA	-	(-)
2015–2016	Sabah	-	(-)
2017	Penang	3	(0)

International career^{‡}
2002–2006	Malaysia	3	(0)
- * Club domestic league appearances and goals as of 1 February 2021 ‡ National team caps and goals as of 1 February 2021

R. Surendren (born 26 October 1982, in Taiping, Perak) is a Malaysian footballer. He is a former member of the Malaysian national team. He has more than 20 years of experience in football industry with a coaching certificate of AFC ‘C’ License.

== Career ==
R. Surendren started his career as a junior football player in 1996 with a bronze medal in Perak Coca-Cola Cup U-16 with his team. In 1998, he participated in Perak MSSM U-18 & Perak MILO Cup U-18 with his teammate. In 1999, he played with Perak TKN Football Club and joined FAM Cup. Then, he participated in Malay Mail Malaysia Premier League in year 2000 to 2001. R. Surendren started his senior career when he represented Perak from 2002 until 2007 and had participated in finals of Malaysia Cup, FA Cup and Sultan Haji Ahmad Shah Cup, quarter finals of AFC Cup and won gold medal in Sukma Sabah (2002). Then, he joined and represented Selangor from 2008 until 2012. During those years, his team had won major title such as Malaysia Cup & FA Cup in 2008 - 2009 and Super League Malaysia and Malaysia Charity Shield in 2009 - 2010. In 2011, he and his teammate Mohd Zaiza Zainal Abidin left Selangor to join Pahang. After one season with Pahang he returned to Selangor for 2012 season. He then joined Malaysian Armed Force @ ATM FA in 2013 and moved to Sabah in 2015 before ending his career as professional football player in 2017 with Penang. He is currently a chief executive officer (CEO) for MNY Football Club (MNYFC), operate in Ipoh, Perak.

== National team ==
In his glory years from 2002 to 2006, he excelled with his playing position as a striker by representing Malaysia team as National Senior Squad. He represented Malaysia team for Olympics and won Bronze medal during SEA Games in Philippines & Vietnam. He also represented Malaysian team under-23 for Pre-Olympics & Sea Games in Vietnam which coached by Allan Harris, Malaysian team under-21 International Youth Championship Tournament (participated by Brazil & Portugal) and won Bronze medal during 2002 Hassanal Bolkiah Trophy through Malaysia team under-21.

== Honours ==
=== Club ===
Perak FA

- Malaysia Premier League: 2003
- Malaysia FA Cup: 2004
- Malaysia Cup: Runners-up 2006
- Malaysia Charity Shield: 2005, 2006

Selangor FA

- Malaysia Super League: 2009, 2010
- Malaysia FA Cup: 2009, Runners-up 2008
- Malaysia Cup: 2008
- Malaysia Charity Shield: 2009, 2010

ATM FA

- Malaysia Charity Shield: 2013
