= Zamri Morshidi =

Malaysian footballer

Personal information
- Full name: Zamri Bin Morshidi
- Date of birth: 20 October 1983 (age 43)
- Place of birth: Sarawak, Malaysia
- Height: 1.75 m (5 ft 9 in)
- Position: Striker

Team information
- Current team: AirAsia F.C.

Youth career
- 2003–2005: Sarawak President's Cup Team

Senior career*
Years	Team	Apps	(Gls)
2005–2012	Sarawak FA	32	(19)
2013	PKNS FC	12	(3)
2013–2014	Sarawak FA	12	(4)
2015	MOF F.C.	18	(3)
2016	AirAsia F.C.	7	(2)
- * Club domestic league appearances and goals as of 20 November 2016 ‡ National team caps and goals as of 20 November 2016

Zamri Bin Morshidi (born 20 November 1983 in Sarawak) is a Malaysian footballer currently playing for AirAsia F.C.

He has played much of his career in a center forward role either as first or second striker.

== Career ==
Zamri started out playing for Sarawak Milo Cup team in 2002. He was called up to Sarawak SUKMA Team for 2 consecutive events in 2002 and 2004. He played for Sarawak President Cup Team in 2003. In 2005, Zamri was promoted into the senior team after playing for the President Cup Team for 2 years. In 2011 season, Zamri has been appointed as Sarawak's captain and helped Sarawak to get runners-up place in Malaysia Premier League and automatic promotion to Malaysia Super League.

After the 2012 season, which saw Sarawak relegated from the Super League, Zamri joined PKNS FC in Malaysia Super League. However, in April 2013, he rejoined Sarawak.

during 2015 he joined Ministry Of Finance FC under supervision of former Sarawak Head Coach/Manager Jalil Ramli.

2016 he transferred to Air Asia All Stars FC ( now known as Petaling Jaya Rangers ) reunited him with fellow former teammate during his Sarawak stint, Reeshafiq Alwi

== International career ==
In 2005, Zamri was called up to Malaysia Under-23 squad for Sea Games, Manila. Unfortunately 3 months before the games starts he got severe injury and has to face several operations.
