= Muamer Salibašić =

Bosnian footballer (born 1984)

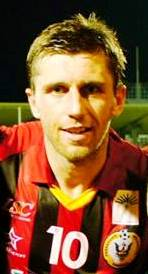
- Salibašić with Sarawak in 2013

Personal information
- Date of birth: 3 December 1984 (age 41)
- Place of birth: Tuzla, SFR Yugoslavia
- Height: 1.86 m (6 ft 1 in)
- Position: Forward

Youth career
- 1999–2005: Gradina

Senior career*
| Years | Team | Apps | (Gls) |
| 2006–2007 | Pomorac Kostrena | 25 | (9) |
| 2007–2008 | Željezničar | 0 | (0) |
| 2009 | Degerfors | 18 | (7) |
| 2010 | Čelik Zenica | 3 | (0) |
| 2010 | Omladinac | | |
| 2011 | Konyaspor | | |
| 2011 | Budućnost Banovići | 21 | (13) |
| 2012 | Varnsdorf | | |
| 2012–2013 | Podgrmeč | 14 | (8) |
| 2013–2015 | Sarawak | | |
| 2015–2016 | Orašje | 11 | (5) |
| 2016 | Sabah | 15 | (7) |
| 2017 | Zvijezda Gradačac | | |
| 2019–2020 | Sarawak | 4 | (1) |

Managerial career
- 2023: TOŠK Tešanj
- 2024: Gradina
- 2024–2025: Tomislav
- 2025: Kelantan The Real Warriors (assistant)
- 2026–: Melaka (assistant)
- * Club domestic league appearances and goals

Muamer Salibašić (born 13 December 1984) is a Bosnian football manager and former player.

== Club career ==
Salibašić left Omladinac Mionica in February 2011 for Turkish Süper Lig outfit Konyaspor. In December 2011, he joined Czech side Varnsdorf from Budućnost Banovići.

=== Sarawak ===
On 14 April 2013, Malaysia Premier League club Sarawak announced that they failed to reach an agreement with Podgrmeč over the transfer of Salibašić and that he would join the club on a one-year deal, prior to the start of the 2013 season. On 16 April however, Sarawak managed to complete the signing and Salibašić was awarded the number 10 shirt.

Salibašić made his debut on 20 April against Perlis at Sarawak State Stadium in a 2–0 win as he provided two assists for Joseph Kalang Tie and Bobby Gonzales. On 14 May 2013, he scored his first league goal in the season against PDRM, netting Sarawak's second goal in a 3–1 home win. On 24 June 2013, he scored in a 4–0 win in a two match final against Kuala Lumpur, as Sarawak were crowned champions.

On 21 September 2013, Salibašić scored the first hat-trick of his career in Sarawak's final group match of the 2013 Malaysia Cup, a 6–1 home win against Perak.

=== Later career ===
In January 2017, Salibašić returned to Bosnia and Herzegovina to play for Zvijezda Gradačac.

== Honours ==
=== Player ===
Sarawak

- Malaysia Premier League: 2013
