= Togaba Kontiwa Komlan =

Togolese footballer

Togaba Komlan
Personal information
- Full name: Togaba Kontiwa Komlan
- Date of birth: December 31, 1990 (age 35)
- Place of birth: Niamtougou, Togo
- Height: 1.79 m (5 ft 10 1/2 in)
- Position: Striker

Youth career
- –2007: ASKO Kara

Senior career*
Years	Team	Apps	(Gls)
2007–2009	ASKO Kara		
2009–2011	CS Sfaxien		
2012–2013	CF Mounana		
2013	USS Kraké		
2013	Sime Darby F.C.		

International career
	Togo U-17	6	
	Togo U-20	8	
	Togo 'B'	8	
2010–	Togo	2	(0)
- * Club domestic league appearances and goals

Togaba Kontiwa Komlan (born December 31, 1990, in Niamtougou) is a Togolese international footballer who plays as a striker.

== Career ==
He played with clubs in Togo, Tunisia, Gabon and Benin, before joining Malaysian club Sime Darby F.C. in 2013.

== International career ==
He had played for his country national team, including a 2012 Africa Cup of Nations qualifier against Tunisia in 2011, in which he was sent off.

Komlan also played for Togo youth teams and 'B' teams.
