= Mohd Khairi Kiman =

Malaysian footballer

Khairi Kiman
Personal information
- Full name: Mohd Khairi bin Kiman
- Date of birth: 3 March 1984 (age 42)
- Place of birth: Johor Bahru, Malaysia
- Height: 1.64 m (5 ft 4 1/2 in)
- Position: Defender

Team information
- Current team: Perlis FA
- Number: 12

Youth career
- 2003: Johor FC

Senior career*
Years	Team	Apps	(Gls)
2004–2012	Johor FC	45	(0)
2013–2014	Perak FA	16	(0)
2015	Sabah FA	7	(0)
2016–	Perlis FA	7	(0)
- * Club domestic league appearances and goals as of July 25, 2017

Mohd Khairi bin Kiman (born 3 March 1984) is a Malaysian footballer who plays as a defender for Malaysia Premier League side, Perlis FA.

The full-back previously has played for Johor FC for 10 years. He joined Perak for the 2013 Malaysia Super League season, making his league debut for Perak on 8 January 2013 against PBDKT T-Team FC. On 11 January, he received his first red card for Perak in the league game against his old club, the newly named Darul Takzim FC. He was not retained by Perak for the 2014 Malaysia Super League season squad, and his contract with Perak was terminated in early April 2014 due to his long-term injuries.
