= Karlo Primorac =

Croatian footballer (born 1984)

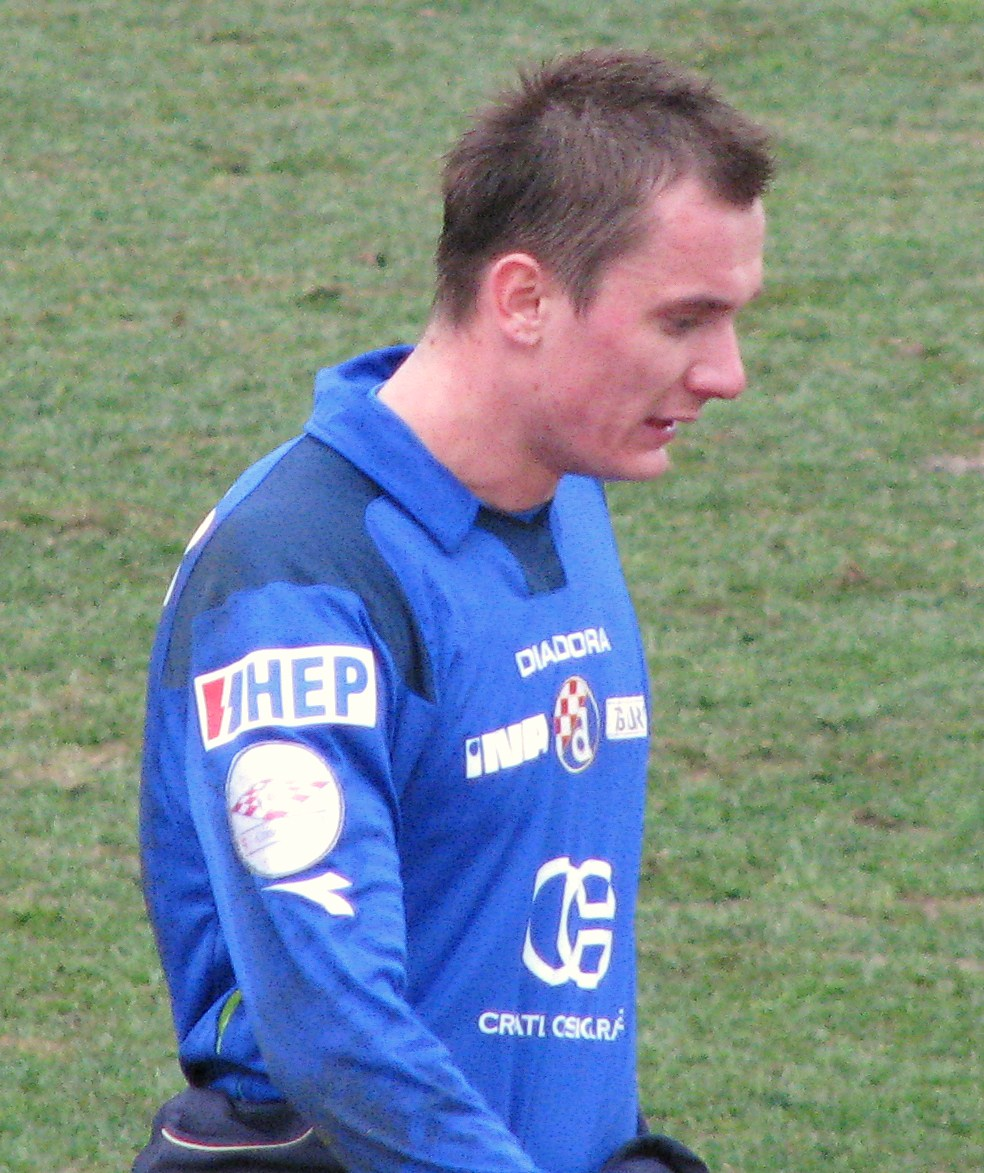
- Primorac with Dinamo Zagreb in 2010

Personal information
- Date of birth: 1 June 1984 (age 42)
- Place of birth: Osijek, SFR Yugoslavia
- Height: 1.88 m (6 ft 2 in)
- Position: Forward

Senior career*
Years	Team	Apps	(Gls)
2003–2010	Osijek	136	(25)
2010	Dinamo Zagreb	9	(0)
2010–2011	Karlovac	20	(5)
2011–2012	Istra 1961	7	(1)
2013	Sime Darby	31	(28)
2014–2015	PKNS	6	(2)

International career^{‡}
2004	Croatia U20	1	(0)
2004–2005	Croatia U21	9	(1)
- * Club domestic league appearances and goals as of 14 February 2014 ‡ National team caps and goals as of 14 February 2014

Karlo Primorac (born 1 June 1984 in Osijek) is a Croatian footballer who plays as a forward.

== Club career ==
A product of Osijek academy, Primorac joined their first team squad in the 2003–04 season and appeared in 17 matches for the club in his first top-flight season. He went on to establish himself as a regular member of Osijek's starting eleven and he appeared in a total of 136 Prva HNL matches and scored 25 goals before being released from the club in January 2010. He was then picked up by Dinamo Zagreb almost immediately, and he signed for the Blues on a free transfer in February 2010. Primorac also played with NK Karlovac and NK Istra 1961.

In 2013, Primorac signed a contract with Sime Darby F.C., then a Malaysia Premier League club. He finished the 2013 season as top scorer in the league, as Sime Darby gained promotion to 2014 Malaysia Super League as runners-up behind Sarawak FA. At the end of the season, he changed club to play with Malaysia Super League club PKNS F.C.

== International career ==
Primorac was also capped for the Croatia U21 national team, appearing in 9 matches and scoring one goal.
