= Andrezinho (footballer, born 1986) =

Brazilian footballer (born 1986)

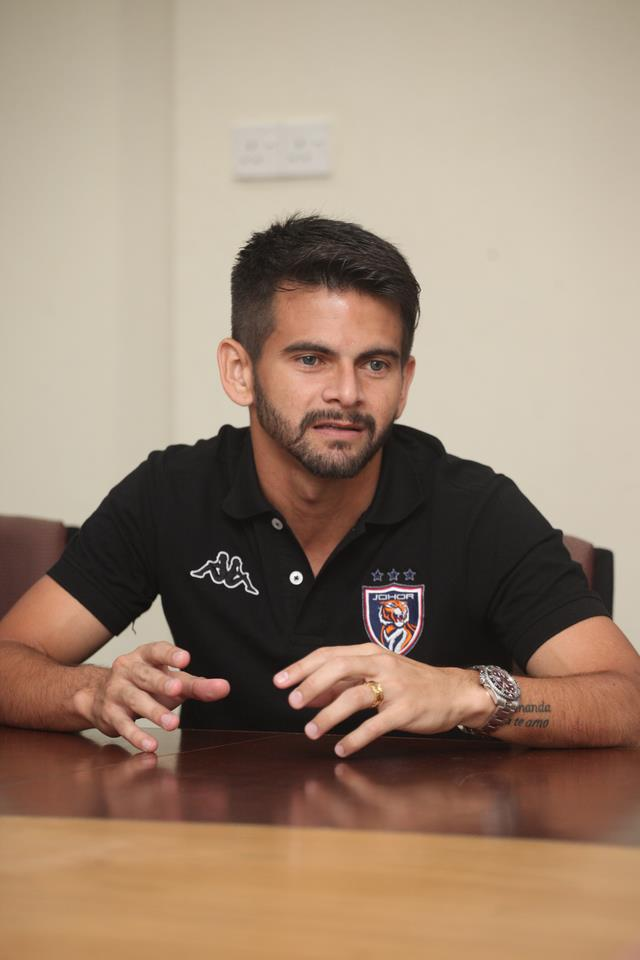

Personal information
- Full name: Andre Francisco Williams Rocha de Silva
- Date of birth: February 12, 1986 (age 40)
- Place of birth: Igarapé, Brazil
- Height: 1.76 m (5 ft 9 1/2 in)
- Position: Midfielder

Senior career*
Years	Team	Apps	(Gls)
2006–2007	Remo	23	(2)
2007–2008	Corinthians	2	(0)
2008	Guarani	8	(0)
2008–2009	Paulista	30	(0)
2009	→ Zhejiang Greentown (loan)	15	(1)
2009–2010	Mogi Mirim	27	(0)
2010–2011	Ferencvárosi TC	24	(1)
2012–2013	Johor FA	22	(8)
2013	Johor Darul Takzim FC	13	(2)
2013–2014	Žalgiris Vilnius	24	(8)
2015	Barito Putera	3	(0)
2015	Al-Hilal Omdurman	13	(1)
2015–2016	PDRM FA	16	(0)
2017	Mogi Mirim	12	(1)
2018	Marcerra Kuantan	4	(1)
2019	PDRM FA	5	(0)
- * Club domestic league appearances and goals as of March 2, 2019 ‡ National team caps and goals as of August 01, 2016

Andre Francisco Williams Rocha de Silva or better known by his nickname Andrezinho (born February 12, 1986) is a Brazilian football player who last played for Malaysia Premier League club PDRM.

== Career ==
=== Beginnings at Clube do Remo ===
The midfielder Andrezinho started playing in the youth teams of Clube do Remo. In 2007, he received his first chance as a professional club, given by then-coach Giba Maniaes. He participated in the Paraense Football Championship, where he played 17 games, made 2 goals and helped the club to be crowned champions of Pará State.

He then played for SC Corinthians, Guarani FC and Paulista FC .

=== China ===
Andrezinho transferred to Hangzhou Greentown FC in China on loan from Paulista FC in 2009. Later, he returned to Brazil to play for Mogi Mirim EC and Grêmio EC.

=== Ferencvárosi TC ===
Andrezinho played for Ferencvárosi TC from 2010 until 2011. Arrived in the summer of 2010 in Ferencvárosi TC. After a few of friendly match, a coach and the management offered him a contract. Andrezinho accepted this, and 2+1 year contract was signed. In summer 2011, the club offered a new contract containing unfavorable conditions to him. As a result, he rejected the offer and then left the team.

=== Malaysia ===
In 2012, he signed for Johor FA, the club played in Malaysia Premier League, Malaysia's second tier league. He played a significant role in Johor FA especially after guiding his team to qualify for Malaysia Cup tournament in 2012.

He was transferred to another club based in Johor, Johor Darul Takzim FC, a club playing in the highest tier in Malaysia league, Malaysia Super League in April 2013. The transfer was made easier as both Johor FA and Johor DT FC are teams under the presidency of Crown Prince of Johor, Tunku Ismail Idris.

=== Indonesia ===
In February 2015, he signed with PS Barito Putera; he is going to wear shirt number 10. His club debut was against Arema Cronus on 7 April 2015 in 2015 Indonesia Super League campaign.

=== Sudan ===
In May 2015, he signed with Al-Hilal Club (Omdurman) and made his official club debut in a match against Congolese TP Mazembe on 27 June 2015 in the African Champions League.
