= Jasazrin Jamaludin =

Malaysian footballer

Personal information
- Full name: Jasazrin bin Jamaludin
- Date of birth: 3 April 1986 (age 40)
- Place of birth: Johor, Malaysia
- Height: 1.72 m (5 ft 8 in)
- Position: Midfielder

Youth career
- 2005: Johor Football Association

Senior career*
Years	Team	Apps	(Gls)
2006–2011	Johor Darul Takzim II		
2012–2016	Johor Darul Takzim	40	(6)
2017–2018	Perak TBG	6	(0)
2018–2019	Penang	10	(1)
2019–2020	Felda United	4	(0)
Total		60	(7)

International career^{‡}
2015–2018	Malaysia	1	(0)
- * Club domestic league appearances and goals as of 27 July 2018 ‡ National team caps and goals as of January 17, 2016

Jasazrin bin Jamaludin (born 3 April 1986) is a Malaysian footballer who plays as a midfielder for Felda United in the Malaysia Super League. He also studied at English College Johore Bahru.

He is one of the line up in the 2015 AFC Cup Final for Johor Darul Takzim FC against FC Istiklol on 31 October 2015 at Pamir Stadium, Dushanbe, Tajikistan

He is also one of the First Johorean played in the Final AFC Cup.

== Honour ==
=== Club ===
Johor Darul Ta'zim

- Malaysia Super League: 2014, 2015, 2016
- Malaysia Charity Shield: 2015, 2016
- Malaysia FA Cup: 2016
- AFC Cup: 2015
