= Armed Forces F.C. =

Malaysian football club

Armed Forces
- Full name: Armed Forces Football Club
- Nicknames: The Gladiators, The Army Club, The Pride Of North Kuala Lumpur, The CSKA Moscow of Malaysia
- Short name: AFFC
- Founded: 1920; 106 years ago, as AFFA; 2019; 7 years ago, as Armed Forces FC
- Ground: Mindef Stadium
- Capacity: 5,000
- Owner: Malaysian Armed Forces
- President: Malek Razak Sulaiman
- Head coach: Kevin Lee Cooper
- League: Malaysia A1 Semi-Pro League
- 2025–26: Malaysia A1 Semi-Pro League, 8th of 16
Home colours	Away colours	Third colours

Armed Forces Football Club, commonly known as Armed Forces, sometimes known as AFFC Kuala Lumpur, is a football section of the Malaysian Armed Forces. Its home ground is Mindef Stadium in Kampung Datuk Keramat, Kuala Lumpur. They currently play in the second division of the Malaysian football league system, the Malaysia A1 Semi-Pro League.

== History ==
The Malaysian Armed Forces Football Association (AFFA) was established in 1920, being one of the earliest teams to exist in Malaysia. The British forces were the first to introduce football competitions in Malaysia by creating the HMS Malaya Cup (now known as the Malaysia Cup), which was contested by states including Singapore in 1921. However, in line with the development of Malaysian football towards the professional era, the team has joined the Liga Semi-Pro which was first introduced in 1989.

Armed Forces had their first major success in the 1997 season, when they won the Malaysia FAM Cup. Domestically, Armed Forces have won the numerous Malaysia football tournaments, besides being 3 times runners-up in the Malaysia Cup, winning the Malaysia Charity Shield and the Malaysian League Division II title in 2012.

=== New ownership and going privatised ===
The club changed its name from ATM FA to Armed Forces FC. In July 2025, the club took part in the Durand Cup in India, under the name of AFFA.

== Crest ==
1920–2018

2019–present

== Players ==
=== First-team squad ===
As of September 2026

Note: Flags indicate national team as defined under FIFA eligibility rules; some limited exceptions apply. Players may hold more than one non-FIFA nationality.

No.	Pos.	Nation	Player
4	MF	MAS	Shahrul Aznei Shopri
6	DF	MAS	Rafael Shahzari Foo
8	FW	MAS	Marcus Mah
9	MF	MAS	Max Fareezan Anak Lidin
11	MF	MAS	Rafizol Roslan
17	FW	MAS	Akmal Md Isa
18	FW	MAS	Faiz Ibrahim (captain)
19	DF	MAS	Azim Faris
20	FW	MAS	Danial Syazrul Rejab
21	MF	MAS	Hairul Iqmal Raffi
25	DF	MAS	Aidil Azhar Nadzhari^{U22}
30	DF	MAS	Fakhrul Izwan Rosdeh

No.	Pos.	Nation	Player
31	GK	MAS	Aiman Mohd Asri
35	MF	MAS	Faiq Mat Alwi
36	GK	MAS	Hafizuddin Azuhar
40	MF	MAS	Nazrul Asraf Mat Bakri
44	DF	KOR	Seung-Won Jung
45	MF	MAS	Mathias Mansor
55	DF	MAS	Noor Aidil Zailani^{U22}
71	DF	MAS	Ariel Danish Shukor^{U22}
77	MF	MAS	Norzaiful Zaizurin
88	DF	MAS	Aiman Nulhakim Zaini

== Club officials ==
Position	Name
Team manager	(England) Kevin Lee Cooper
Assistant Team manager	(Malaysia) Mohd Noorazam Abd Razak
Assistant coach	(Malaysia) Boon Aik Hau (England) James Richard Barnett
Goalkeeping coach	(Malaysia) Mohammad Alif Daud
Fitness coach	(Malaysia) Masrizar Mizalan
Physiotherapist	(Malaysia) Muhd Aizat Mohd Zabidi
Team doctor	(Malaysia) Fazlizam Ahmad
Media officer	(Malaysia) Mohd Saiful Asmadi Bin Mansor
Kitman	(Malaysia) Muhammad Dzulfadhlie Shamsuri (Malaysia) Muhammad Amirul Izuan Bin Adnan

== Kit manufacturers and shirt sponsors ==
Season	Manufacturer	Sponsor
1998	Adidas	Dunhill
1999	Admiral	Dunhill
2004	J-King	Dunhill
2006	Figos	Celcom, TM Net
2007	Kappa	Celcom, Inai Kiara
2009	Kappa	Streamyx
2010	Line 7	TM
2011	Kappa	
2012	Kappa	
2013	Macron	
2014	Lotto	Ecobumi
2015	Warrix Sports	Ecobumi
2016	SkyHawk	
2017	Admiral	
2018	Admiral	Transwater API Sdn Bhd
2019–2022	Ego Sports	Transwater API Sdn Bhd
2023	Al-Ikhsan	MBSB Bank
2024	Hayz En Dosz	MBSB Bank
2025	ALTR	

== Season by season record ==
Year	Position	League	Malaysia FA Cup	Malaysia Cup/Malaysia Challenge Cup	Top scorer (league)
2011	7th	Malaysia Premier League	2nd round	DNQ	(Malaysia) V. Jaganathan (9 goals)
2012	1st, Champion	Malaysia Premier League	Round of 32	Runners-up	(Saint Vincent and the Grenadines) Marlon Alex James (33 goals)
2013	6th	Malaysia Super League	First round	Semi-finals	(Saint Vincent and the Grenadines) Marlon Alex James (26 goals)
2014	10th	Malaysia Super League	First round	Group stage	(Argentina) Juan Arostegui (9 goals)
2015	11th (relegated)	Malaysia Super League	First round	Not participated	(Honduras) Jerry Palacios (6 goals)
2016	11th	Malaysia Premier League	Third round	Not participated	(Malaysia) Venice Elphi (5 goals)
2017	11th (relegated)	Malaysia Premier League	Second round	Not participated	(Malaysia) Venice Elphi (9 goals)
2018	3rd, group A	Malaysia FAM League	Second round	Semi-final	(Malaysia) Zaironi Yusof (6 goals)
2019	3rd	Malaysia M3 League	Second round	Not Participated	(Malaysia) Rafizol Roslan (22 goals)
2020	Cancelled due to COVID-19 pandemic				
2021	Cancelled due to COVID-19 pandemic				
2022	3rd, group B	Malaysia M3 League	Second round	Not participated	(Malaysia) Faiz Ibrahim (18 goals)
2023	11th	Malaysia M3 League	Not participated	Not participated	(Malaysia) Hairul Iqmal Raffi (7 goals)
2024–25	8th	A1 Semi-Pro League	Not participated	Not participated	(Ghana) Ogolo Williams (10 goals)
2025–26	8th	A1 Semi-Pro League	Not participated	Not participated	(Malaysia) Hadi Mohamad (8 goals)

Champions	Runners-up	Third place	Promoted	Relegated

== Continental record ==
Season	Competition	Round	Opponent	Home	Away	Aggregate
2025	Durand Cup	Group stage	(India) Shillong Lajong	6–0		
2025	Durand Cup	Group stage	(India) NorthEast United	3–1		
2025	Durand Cup	Group stage	(India) Rangdajied United	1–0		

== Coaching history ==
Years	Head coach
1990–93	(England) Alan Mullery
1999	(Malaysia) Shafiq Zulhilmi Kee Abdullah
2000–01	(Malaysia) Muhd Abdul Rani
2007–08	(Malaysia) Abdul Nasser Ahmad
2008–09	(Malaysia) Zainuddin Abdul Ghani
2009	(Malaysia) Mat Sidik Abas
2010–11	(Malaysia) Mohd Razali Ali
2012–13	(Malaysia) B. Sathianathan
April 2013	(Malaysia) Alias Jaafar
2018	(Malaysia) Mazelan Kasap
2019–21	(England) Kevin Lee Cooper
2022	(Malaysia) Boon Aik Hau
2023–	(England) Kevin Lee Cooper

== Honours ==
=== Domestic competitions ===
==== League ====
- Division 2/Premier League

(gold) Winners (1): 2012

- Division 3/FAM Cup/M3 League/A1 League

(gold) Winners (2): 1958, 1997

(silver) Runners-up (2): 1954, 2006

(bronze) Third place (1): 2019

=== Cups ===
- Sultan Haji Ahmad Shah Cup

(gold) Winners (1): 2013

- Malaysia Cup

(silver) Runners-up (3): 1949, 1966, 2012

== Affiliated clubs ==
- (Malaysia) Tentera Darat
- (Malaysia) Royal Malaysian Navy FC
- (Malaysia) Royal Malaysian Air Force FC
- (Malaysia) RAMD FC
