= 2013 Terengganu FA season =

Terengganu
2013 season
- President: Che Mat Jusoh
- Manager: Marzuki Sulong
- Head Coach: E. Elavarasan
- Stadium: Sultan Ismail Nasiruddin Shah Stadium, Kuala Terengganu
- Super League: 9th
- FA Cup: Semi-finals
- Malaysia Cup: Group-stage
- Top goalscorer: League: Effa Owona (6); All: Effa Owona (12)
- Highest home attendance: 9,500 vs Kelantan (17 September 2013)
- Lowest home attendance: 1,300 vs PKNS FC (2 July 2013)
- Average home league attendance: 5,132
Home colours	Away colours

The Football Association of Terengganu (Bahasa Melayu: Persatuan Bola Sepak Negeri Terengganu (PBSNT) enters a team in Malaysian football competitions to represent the state of Terengganu. The team is based in Kuala Terengganu, Terengganu, Malaysia. They play in the top division in Malaysian football, the Malaysian Super League. Their home stadium is the Sultan Ismail Nasiruddin Shah Stadium, Kuala Terengganu.

The 2013 season was Terengganu's 3rd season in the Malaysia Super League, and their 18th consecutive season in the top-flight of Malaysian football. In addition, they were competing in the domestic tournaments, the 2013 Malaysia FA Cup and the 2013 Malaysia Cup

Terengganu will announce their sponsors for the 2013 season as well as presenting the new kits on 3 January 2013.

== Club ==
=== Current coaching staff ===
Position	Name
Manager	(Malaysia) Marzuki Sulong
Assistant Manager 1	(Malaysia) Zulkifli Ali
Assistant Manager 2	(Malaysia) Ahmad Awang
Head team coach	(Malaysia) E. Elavarasan
Assistant coach	(Malaysia) Mohammad Nik
Reserve team coach	(Malaysia) Zakari Alias
Goalkeeping coach	(Malaysia) Mohd Zubir Ibrahim
Fitness Coach	(Malaysia) Joseph Ronald D'Angelus
Physiotherapist	(Malaysia) Dato' Dr. Syed Mohd Salleh Syed Yussof Al-Zawawi
Kit manager	(Malaysia) Suhaimi Muhamad

=== Kit sponsors ===
• Specs •
Desa Murni Batik • PFCE • Zon Ria • Sinar Harian • TDM Berhad • Mizi Sports • Happy

== Players ==
Terengganu FA squad 2013.

=== All squad ===
No.	Name	Nationality	Position	Age
Goalkeepers
1	Syed Adney Syed Hussein	(Malaysia)	GK	27
24	Mohd Sharmiza Yusoff	(Malaysia)	GK	24
25	Wan Azraie Wan Teh	(Malaysia)	GK	27
Defenders
2	Wan Firdaus Wan Demi	(Malaysia)	RB	22
3	Mohd Muhaimin Omar	(Malaysia)	RB	24
4	Qhairul Anwar Roslani	(Malaysia)	RB	26
5	Nik Zul Aziz Nawawi	(Malaysia)	LB	26
13	Hasmizan Kamarodin (c)	(Malaysia)	CB	29
15	Vincent Bikana	(Cameroon)	CB	21
16	Mohd Zubir Azmi	(Malaysia)	LB	22
19	Rosdi Talib	(Malaysia)	LB	37
23	Mohd Faizal Muhammad (vice-captain)	(Malaysia)	CB	24
Midfielders
7	Ismail Faruqi Asha'ri	(Malaysia)	CM	27
8	G. Puaneswaran	(Malaysia)	RW	30
11	Nasril Izzat Jalil	(Malaysia)	CM	22
12	Khairan Ezuan Razali	(Malaysia)	CM	27
14	Mohd Fakhrurazi Musa	(Malaysia)	CM	22
17	Khairul Ramadhan Zauwawi	(Malaysia)	LW	25
18	Ahmad Nordin Alias	(Malaysia)	CM	28
20	Shamsul Kamal Mohamad	(Malaysia)	RW	24
22	Ashaari Shamsuddin	(Malaysia)	LW	28
Forwards
9	Mohd Farderin Kadir	(Malaysia)	FW	26
10	Jean-Emmanuel Effa Owona	(Cameroon)	FW	30
21	Abdul Manaf Mamat	(Malaysia)	FW	26

== Transfers ==
All start dates are pending confirmation.

=== In ===
Date	Pos.	Name	From	Fee	Source
November 2012	GK	(Malaysia) (Selangor) Syed Adney	(Malaysia) Sabah FA		
November 2012	DF	(Malaysia) (Terengganu) Wan Muhammad Firdaus	(Malaysia) (Terengganu) Youth system		
November 2012	DF	(Malaysia) (Negeri Sembilan) Qhairul Anwar Roslani	(Malaysia) Negeri Sembilan FA		
November 2012	MF	(Malaysia) (Kuala Lumpur) G. Puaneswaran	(Kuala Lumpur) Pos Malaysia FC		
November 2012	FW	(Malaysia) (Malacca) Farderin Kadir	(Malaysia) (Kuala Lumpur) Felda United FC		
November 2012	FW	(Cameroon) Jean-Emmanuel Effa Owona	(Malaysia) Negeri Sembilan FA		
November 2012	MF	(Malaysia) Nasril Izzat Jalil	(Malaysia) UiTM FC		
November 2012	MF	(Malaysia) (Kelantan) Khairan Ezuan Razali	(Malaysia) (Kuala Lumpur) Felda United FC		
November 2012	DF	(Cameroon) Vincent Bikana	(Romania) FC Petrolul Ploiești		
November 2012	DF	(Malaysia) (Terengganu) Rosdi Talib	(Malaysia) (Terengganu) T-Team FC		
November 2012	GK	(Malaysia) (Terengganu) Wan Azraie Wan Teh	(Malaysia) Pahang FA		

=== Out ===
Date	Pos.	Name	To	Fee	Source
November 2012	GK	(Malaysia) (Terengganu) Sharbinee Allawee Ramli	(Malaysia) Selangor FA		
November 2012	DF	(Malaysia) (Terengganu) Mohd Marzuki Yusof	(Malaysia) (Terengganu) T-Team FC		
November 2012	DF	(Malaysia) (Perlis) Mazlizam Mohamad	(Malaysia) (Terengganu) T-Team FC		
November 2012	DF	(Malaysia) (Terengganu) Mohd Muslim Ahmad	(Malaysia) (Johor) Darul Takzim FC		
November 2012	DF	(Malaysia) (Terengganu) Hariri Mohd Safii	(Malaysia) Kedah FA		
November 2012	MF	(Malaysia) (Sarawak) Reeshafiq Alwi	(Malaysia) (Selangor) PKNS FC		
November 2012	MF	(Brazil) Erison Baiano	Release		
November 2012	MF	(Malaysia) (Terengganu) Abdul Shukor Jusoh	(Malaysia) Selangor FA		
November 2012	MF	(Malaysia) (Sarawak) Joseph Kalang Tie	(Malaysia) Sarawak FA		
November 2012	FW	(Malaysia) (Terengganu) Ailim Fahmi	(Malaysia) Perlis FA		
November 2012	FW	(Malaysia) (Selangor) Abdul Hadi Yahya	(Malaysia) Perak FA		
November 2012	FW	(Liberia) Francis Forkey Doe	(Malaysia) Selangor FA		

== Pre-season and friendlies ==
8 December 2012 Pre-season	Terengganu FA	4–0	Perlis FA	Kuala Terengganu
20:45	Owona; Puaneswaran; Ismail			Stadium: Sultan Ismail Nasiruddin Shah Stadium

30 December 2012 Pre-season	Terengganu FA	2–2	(Terengganu) T-Team FC	Kuala Terengganu
20:45	Owona		Latif; Folan	Stadium: Sultan Ismail Nasiruddin Shah Stadium; Attendance: 15,000

4 February 2013 Friendly Match	Terengganu FA	6–0	(Kelantan) Tumpat FA	Kuala Terengganu
16:45	Ismail; Manaf; Owona			Stadium: Sultan Ismail Nasiruddin Shah Stadium

8 February 2013 Friendly Match	PDRM FA (Malaysia)	1–4	Terengganu FA	Kuantan
16:45			Ismail; Manaf; Owona	Stadium: Padang Bolasepak Akademi Belia Pahang

20 March 2013 Friendly Match	Sime Darby FC (Kuala Lumpur)	0–0	Terengganu FA	Shah Alam
20:45				Stadium: Padang Bukit Jelutong

12 June 2013 Friendly Match	Terengganu FA	3–0	(Terengganu) T-Team FC	Kuala Terengganu
20:45	Ashaari 28'; Ismail 73'; Puaneswaran 89' (pen.)			Stadium: Sultan Ismail Nasiruddin Shah Stadium

== Super League ==
The fixtures for the 2013 season were announced on 8 January 2013. The league is set to start on 8 January 2013.

=== League table ===
Pos	Team	Pld	W	D	L	GF	GA	GD	Pts	Qualification or relegation
7	Perak	22	8	5	9	23	27	−4	29	
8	PKNS	22	8	4	10	34	34	0	28	
9	Terengganu	22	7	6	9	25	31	−6	27	
10	T-Team	22	5	4	13	19	33	−14	19	
11	Felda United	22	4	7	11	13	35	−22	19	Relegation to 2014 Liga Premier

Source: RSSSF
Rules for classification: 1) points; 2) goal difference; 3) number of goals scored

==== Results summary ====
Overall								Home						Away					
Pld	W	D	L	GF	GA	GD	Pts	W	D	L	GF	GA	GD	W	D	L	GF	GA	GD
22	7	6	9	25	31	−6	27	4	3	4	12	14	−2	3	3	5	13	17	−4

Last updated: 6 July 2013.
Source: Competitive matches

==== Results by round ====
Round	1	2	3	4	5	6	7	8	9	10	11	12	13	14	15	16	17	18	19	20	21	22
Ground	H	A	H	A	A	H	A	H	A	H	A	H	A	H	A	H	H	A	H	A	H	A
Result	D	D	L	L	L	W	L	W	W	W	L	L	W	W	L	L	D	W	L	D	D	D
Position	6	9	11	11	12	10	11	9	9	7	8	9	7	6	8	9	9	8	9	9	9	9

Updated to match(es) played on 25 June 2013. Source: Competitive Matches
A = Away; H = Home; W = Win; D = Draw; L = Loss

=== Matches ===
Win Draw Loss
Kickoff times are in +08:00 GMT.

8 January 2013 1	Terengganu FA	1–1	(Kuala Lumpur) FELDA United FC	Kuala Terengganu
16:45	Faizal (yellow card) 7'; Ismail 59'; Zubir (yellow card) 55'		Ghaddar 54'	Stadium: Sultan Ismail Nasiruddin Shah Stadium; Attendance: 5,300; Man of the Match: Ismail Faruqi

11 January 2013 2	Negeri Sembilan FA	0–0	Terengganu FA	Seremban
20:45		Report	Bikana (yellow card) 21'; Qhairul (yellow card) 36'; Ashaari (yellow card) 68'; Faizal (yellow card) 70'	Stadium: Tuanku Abdul Rahman Stadium; Attendance: 4,000; Referee: Zamzaidi Katimin

15 January 2013 3	Terengganu FA	1–2	Selangor FA	Kuala Terengganu
16:45	Owona 17'; Ismail (yellow card) 55'	Report	Kunalan 6'; Amri 16'	Stadium: Sultan Ismail Nasiruddin Shah Stadium; Attendance: 7,500

19 January 2013 4	Lions XII (Singapore)	2–1	Terengganu FA	Singapore
19:45	Safuwan 64'; Syafiq 74'	Report	Owona 32', (yellow card) 37'	Stadium: Jalan Besar Stadium; Attendance: 6,800; Referee: Azman Jamalludin

22 January 2013 5	Pahang FA	3–0	Terengganu FA	Kuantan
20:45	Hafiz 77', 90'; Fauzi 78'		Nik Zul (yellow card) 30'; Hasmizan (yellow card) 76'; Bikana (yellow card) 78'; Manaf (yellow card) 90+4'	Stadium: Darulmakmur Stadium; Attendance: 15,000

15 February 2013 6	Terengganu FA	2–0	Perak FA	Kuala Terengganu
16:45	Ashaari 13'; Owona 46'; Khairul (yellow card) 85'; Ismail (yellow card) 90+1' (red card)	Report		Stadium: Sultan Ismail Nasiruddin Shah Stadium; Attendance: 2,800; Referee: Nagor Amir Noor Mohamed; Man of the Match: Ashaari Shamsuddin

19 February 2013 7	Kelantan FA	2–0	Terengganu FA	Kota Bharu
20:45	Mandjou 33', 65'	Report	Bikana (yellow card) 35'; Muhaimin (yellow card) 59'; Nordin (yellow card) 65'; Faizal (red card) 79'	Stadium: Sultan Mohammad IV Stadium; Attendance: 10,000; Referee: Syed Azhar Syed Kamar (Kuala Lumpur)

23 February 2013 8	Terengganu FA	3–2	ATM FA	Kuala Terengganu
16:45	Khairul 30'; Zubir (yellow card) 33'; G. Puaneswaran (yellow card) 63'; Ashaari 81', 90+5'	Report	Marlon 75'; Christie 89'	Stadium: Sultan Ismail Nasiruddin Shah Stadium; Attendance: 2,600; Referee: Wan Mohd Tarmizi Wan Ibrahim; Man of the Match: Ashaari Shamsuddin

2 March 2013 9	PKNS FC (Selangor)	0–2	Terengganu FA	Shah Alam
20:45			Owona 9'; Manaf 26'; Khairul (yellow card) 35'; G. Puaneswaran (yellow card) 90'	Stadium: Shah Alam Stadium; Attendance: 350; Referee: Teo Hee Loon; Man of the Match: Ashaari Shamsuddin

8 March 2013 10	Terengganu FA	1–0	(Terengganu) T-Team FC	Kuala Terengganu
16:45	Zubir (yellow card) 39'; Ismail (yellow card) 45+1'; Khairul (yellow card) 79'; Ashaari (yellow card) 90'; Farderin 90+2'			Stadium: Sultan Ismail Nasiruddin Shah Stadium; Attendance: 3,500; Referee: Wan Mohd Tarmizi Wan Ibrahim; Man of the Match: Hasmizan Kamarodin

30 March 2013 11	Darul Takzim FC (Johor)	3–2	Terengganu FA	Johor Bahru
20:45	Güiza 37' (pen.), 45+1'; Azwan 49'; Tharmini (yellow card) 71' (yellow-red card)		Owona 10', 55', (yellow card) 43'; Manaf (yellow card) 23'; Rosdi (yellow card) 36'; Ashaari (yellow card) 79'	Stadium: Tan Sri Dato Hj Hassan Yunos Stadium; Attendance: 28,000; Referee: Suhaizi Shukri

12 April 2013 12	Terengganu FA	0–1	(Johor) Darul Takzim FC	Kuala Terengganu
16:45		Report	Norshahrul 25'	Stadium: Sultan Ismail Nasiruddin Shah Stadium; Attendance: 8,000; Referee: Lismotia Mohem Mohd Tisan

20 April 2013 13	FELDA United FC (Kuala Lumpur)	1–2	Terengganu FA	Kelana Jaya
16:45	Azrul 54'		Faizal 7'; Ismail (yellow card) 53'; Ashaari (yellow card) 68'; Fakhrurazi (yellow card) 82'; Puaneswaran 85'; Bikana (yellow card) 90+2'	Stadium: Petaling Jaya Stadium

26 April 2013 14	Terengganu FA	1–0	Negeri Sembilan FA	Kuala Terengganu
16:45	Ashaari 90+4' (pen.), (yellow card) 90+5' (yellow-red card)			Stadium: Sultan Ismail Nasiruddin Shah Stadium; Attendance: 2,700; Referee: Teo Hee Loon; Man of the Match: Vincent Bikana

22 May 2013 15	Selangor FA	2–0	Terengganu FA	Shah Alam
20:45	Doe 24', 89'		Qhairul (yellow card) 59'; Manaf (yellow card) 88'	Stadium: Shah Alam Stadium; Attendance: 3,000; Referee: Teoh Hee Loon

7 May 2013 16	Terengganu FA	1–2	(Singapore) Lions XII	Kuala Terengganu
16:45	Nik Zul (yellow card) 31'; Ismail 64'; Hasmizan (yellow card) 68'; Nordin (yellow card) 74'; Bikana (yellow card) 90+1'		Baihakki 79'; Madhu (yellow card) 87' (yellow-red card); Hasmizan 90+3' (o.g.)	Stadium: Sultan Ismail Nasiruddin Shah Stadium; Attendance: 2,300; Referee: Wan Mohd Tarmizi Wan Ibrahim

11 May 2013 17	Terengganu FA	2–2	Pahang FA	Kuala Terengganu
16:45	Khairul 11'; Sharmiza (yellow card) 31'; Ismail (yellow card) 56' (yellow-red card); Manaf 65'		Faizol 58'; Malik 90+4'	Stadium: Sultan Ismail Nasiruddin Shah Stadium; Attendance: 2,600; Referee: Syed Azhar Syed Kamar (Kuala Lumpur); Man of the Match: Ashaari

17 May 2013 18	Perak FA	1–3	Terengganu FA	Ipoh
20:45	Azlan Ismail 57'		Manaf 18'; Bikana (yellow card) 38'; Fakhrurazi 66'; Hasmizan (yellow card) 72'; Khairul 89' (pen.)	Stadium: Perak Stadium; Attendance: 7,000; Referee: Suhaizi Shukri; Man of the Match: Manaf

21 June 2013 19	Terengganu FA	0–4	Kelantan FA	Kuala Terengganu
20:45	Nordin (yellow card) 82'		Badhri 13'; Nwakaeme 47'; Farhan 50'; Faiz 56'	Stadium: Sultan Ismail Nasiruddin Shah Stadium; Attendance: 8,500; Referee: Nafeez Abd Wahab

25 June 2013 20	ATM FA	1–1	Terengganu FA	Paroi
20:45	Christie 66'		Khairan (yellow card) 61'; Bikana; Farderin 80'	Stadium: Tuanku Abdul Rahman Stadium; Attendance: 1,000; Referee: Nafeez Abd Wahab

2 July 2013 21	Terengganu FA	0–0	(Selangor) PKNS FC	Kuala Terengganu
20:45	Muhaimin (yellow card) 60'			Stadium: Sultan Ismail Nasiruddin Shah Stadium; Attendance: 1,300; Referee: Nafeez Abd Wahab

6 July 2013 22	T-Team FC (Terengganu)	2–2	Terengganu FA	Kuala Terengganu
20:45	Damir 13'; Syamim 60'		Muhaimin (yellow card) 11'; Nasril 37'; Fakhrurazi 52'; Owona (yellow card) 65'	Stadium: Sultan Ismail Nasiruddin Shah Stadium; Attendance: 400; Referee: Nagor Amir

== FA Cup ==
Terengganu will begin their FA Cup campaign in the first round, vs Putrajaya SPA FC. The draw for the FA Cup's first and subsequent rounds was held on 10 December 2012 at Grand BlueWave Hotel, Shah Alam, Selangor.

=== Round of 32 ===
25 January 2013 1st Round	Putrajaya SPA FC	1–3	Terengganu FA	Selayang
16:15	Islam 90' (pen.)		Hasmizan (yellow card) 11'; Ismail 16'; Rosdi (yellow card) 33'; Zubir (yellow card) 48'; Ashaari (yellow card) 55'; Faizal (yellow card) 62'; Owona 69', 86'	Stadium: Selayang Stadium; Attendance: 200; Referee: Teo Hee Loon

=== Round of 16 ===
26 February 2013 2nd Round	Penang FA	0–3	Terengganu FA	George Town
16:15			Ashaari 2', 59'; Khairul Ramadhan 75'; Muhaimin (yellow card) 88'; Nasril (yellow card) 92'	Stadium: City Penang Stadium; Attendance: 5,000; Referee: Kamal Ahmad; Man of the Match: Ashaari

=== Quarter-finals ===
6 April 2013 1st leg	Negeri Sembilan FA	1–3	Terengganu FA	Seremban
20:45	Nazrin 73'	Report	Bikana (yellow card) 23'; Owona 77'; Hasmizan (yellow card) 85'; Ashaari 90+1'; Nordin 90+3'	Stadium: Tuanku Abdul Rahman Stadium; Attendance: 3,000; Referee: Syed Azhar Syed Kamar; Man of the Match: Owona

16 April 2013 2nd leg	Terengganu FA	3–0 (6–1 agg.)	Negeri Sembilan FA	Kuala Terengganu
16:45	Ashaari 25'; Owona (yellow card) 51', (goal) 54', 71' (pen.)			Stadium: Sultan Ismail Nasiruddin Shah Stadium; Attendance: 4,500; Referee: Suhaizi Shukri; Man of the Match: Owona

=== Semi-finals ===
25 May 2013 1st leg	Kelantan FA	4–1	Terengganu FA	Kota Bharu
20:45	Nwakaeme 79'; Indra 88'; Obinna 90+2' (pen.); Zairo 90+3'		Ashaari 2'; Fakhrurazi (yellow card) 14'; Faizal (yellow card) 65'	Stadium: Sultan Mohammad IV Stadium; Attendance: 20,000; Referee: Nagor Amir

28 May 2013 2nd leg	Terengganu FA	4–2 (a.e.t.) (5–6 agg.)	Kelantan FA	Kuala Terengganu
TBA	Bikana 5'; Puaneswaran 27'; Hasmizan (yellow card) 67'; Owona 71', (yellow card) 90+4' (yellow-red card); Manaf 90+2', (red card) 93'; Fakhrurazi (yellow card) 105+1'	Report	Obinna 90+5'; Nwakaeme 129'	Stadium: Sultan Ismail Nasiruddin Shah Stadium; Attendance: 8,500; Referee: Suhaizi Shukri; Man of the Match: Bikana

== Malaysia Cup ==
=== Group stage ===
Team	Pld	W	D	L	GF	GA	GD	Pts	KEL	PAH	NEG	TER
Kelantan FA (A)	6	3	2	1	13	6	+7	11		4–0	2–3	2–0
Pahang FA (A)	6	2	2	2	11	11	0	8	1–1		3–0	1–1
Negeri Sembilan FA	6	2	2	2	11	13	−2	8	1–1	3–5		2–2
Terengganu FA	6	1	2	3	6	11	−5	5	1–3	2–1	0–2	

(A) Advance to the 2013 Piala Malaysia quarter finals

20 August 2013 1	Terengganu	0–2	Negeri Sembilan FA	Kuala Terengganu
20:45			Fabio 39'; Sivanesan 53'	Stadium: Sultan Ismail Nasiruddin Shah Stadium; Attendance: 6,000; Referee: Syed Azhar

24 August 2013 2	Kelantan FA	2–0	Terengganu FA	Kota Bharu
20:45	Nwakaeme 11'; Zairo 73'			Stadium: Sultan Muhammad IV Stadium; Attendance: 15,000; Referee: Nafeez Abdul Wahab (Johor)

27 August 2013 3	Pahang FA	1–1	Terengganu FA	Kuantan
20:45	Conti 15'		Ashaari 8'	Stadium: Darulmakmur Stadium; Attendance: 12,000; Referee: Nafeez Abdul Wahab (Johor)

31 August 2013 4	Terengganu	2–1	Pahang FA	Kuala Terengganu
20:45	Owona 63'; Khairul 90+4'		Azamuddin 69'	Stadium: Sultan Ismail Nasiruddin Shah Stadium; Attendance: 6,500; Referee: Nagor Amir

17 September 2013 5	Terengganu	1–3	Kelantan FA	Kuala Terengganu
20:45	Ashaari 75'		Hasmizan 28' (o.g.); Indra 57'; Badri 86'	Stadium: Sultan Ismail Nasiruddin Shah Stadium; Attendance: 9,500; Referee: Syed Azhar

21 September 2013 6	Negeri Sembilan FA	2–2	Terengganu FA	Paroi
20:45	Fabio 20'; Nazrin 71'		Owona 18'; Ashaari 88'	Stadium: Tuanku Abdul Rahman Stadium; Attendance: 10,000; Referee: Wan Mohd Tarmizi

== Statistics ==
=== Squad statistics ===
As of 25 August 2013

No.	Pos.	Name	Super League		FA Cup		Malaysia Cup		Total		Discipline	
No.	Pos.	Name	Apps	Goals	Apps	Goals	Apps	Goals	Apps	Goals	Yellow card	Red card
1	GK	(Malaysia) Syed Adney Syed Hussein	1	0	0	0	0	0	1	0	0	0
2	DF	(Malaysia) Wan Firdaus Wan Demi	0	0	0	0	0	0	0	0	0	0
3	DF	(Malaysia) Mohd Muhaimin Omar	13	0	2	0	1	0	16	0	3	0
4	DF	(Malaysia) Qhairul Anwar Roslani	9(2)	0	1(1)	0	0	0	10(3)	0	2	0
5	DF	(Malaysia) Nik Zul Aziz Nawawi	6	0	1	0	0	0	7	0	2	0
7	MF	(Malaysia) Ismail Faruqi Asha'ri	13(2)	3	4	1	0	0	17(2)	3	5	2
8	MF	(Malaysia) G. Puaneswaran	16(6)	1	4	1	2	0	22(6)	2	2	0
9	FW	(Malaysia) Mohd Farderin Kadir	6(5)	2	0(1)	0	1(1)	0	7(7)	1	0	0
10	FW	(Cameroon) Jean-Emmanuel Effa Owona	15	6	5(1)	5	1	0	21(1)	12	3	0
11	MF	(Malaysia) Nasril Izzat Jalil	1(5)	1	0(2)	0	0	0	1(7)	1	0	0
12	MF	(Malaysia) Khairan Ezuan Razali	7(2)	0	0	0	1	0	8(2)	0	1	0
13	DF	(Malaysia) Hasmizan Kamarodin(Vice captain)	11(3)	0	5	0	2	0	18(3)	0	3	0
14	MF	(Malaysia) Mohd Fakhrurazi Musa	5(11)	2	1(3)	0	0(2)	0	6(16)	2	1	0
15	DF	(Cameroon) Vincent Bikana	18	0	6	1	2	0	26	1	7	0
16	DF	(Malaysia) Mohd Zubir Azmi	17	0	5	0	2	0	24	0	3	0
17	MF	(Malaysia) Khairul Ramadhan Zauwawi	11(5)	3	3(2)	1	1	0	15(7)	4	3	0
18	MF	(Malaysia) Ahmad Nordin Alias	19	0	5	1	2	0	26	1	3	0
19	DF	(Malaysia) Rosdi Talib	3(2)	0	1	0	0(1)	0	4(3)	0	1	0
20	MF	(Malaysia) Shamsul Kamal Mohamad	0	0	0	0	0	0	0	0	0	0
21	FW	(Malaysia) Abdul Manaf Mamat	16(3)	3	5	1	2	0	23(3)	4	3	0
22	MF	(Malaysia) Ashaari Shamsuddin	19	4	6	5	2	0	27	9	4	1
23	DF	(Malaysia) Mohd Faizal Muhammad (Captain)	15	1	4	0	1	0	20	1	2	1
24	GK	(Malaysia) Mohd Sharmiza Yusoff	14	0	5	0	2	0	21	0	1	0
25	GK	(Malaysia) Wan Azraie Wan Teh	7(2)	0	1	0	0	0	8(2)	0	0	0

== Top scorers ==
Rank	Player	Position	Super League	FA Cup	Malaysia Cup	Total
1	(Cameroon) Jean-Emmanuel Effa Owona	FW	6	6	2	14
2	(Malaysia) Ashaari Shamsuddin	MF	4	5	3	12
3	(Malaysia) Khairul Ramadhan Zauwawi	MF	3	1	1	5
3	(Malaysia) Abdul Manaf Mamat	CF	3	1	0	4
5	(Malaysia) Ismail Faruqi Asha'ri	MF	2	1	0	3
6	(Malaysia) G. Puaneswaran	MF	1	1	0	2
6	(Malaysia) Mohd Fakhrurazi Musa	MF	2	0	0	2
6	(Malaysia) Mohd Farderin Kadir	CF	2	0	0	2
9	(Malaysia) Ahmad Nordin Alias	CM	0	1	0	1
9	(Malaysia) Mohd Faizal Muhammad	DF	1	0	0	1
9	(Malaysia) Nasril Izzat Jalil	MF	1	0	0	1
9	(Cameroon) Vincent Bikana	DF	0	1	0	1
Total			25	17	6	48

Last updated: 21 September 2013
Source: Match reports in Competitive matches

== Captains ==
No.	Name	Position	No. Super League	No. FA Cup	No. Malaysia Cup	Total
23	(Malaysia) Mohd Faizal Muhammad	DF	6	1	0	7
13	(Malaysia) Hasmizan Kamarodin	DF	3	2	0	5

Last updated: 24 February 2013
Source: Competitive match reports.
Competitive matches only
Matches started as captain only
Country: FIFA nationality; No.: Squad number; P: Position; Name: Player name; No. Games: Number of games started as captain.

== Scoring records ==
- First goal of the season in Super League: Ismail Faruqi against FELDA United FC (8 January 2013)
- First goal of the season in FA Cup: Ismail Faruqi against Putrajaya SPA FC (25 January 2013)
- First goal of the season in Cup:
- Fastest goal of the season in Super League: 9 minutes Effa Owona against PKNS FC (2 March 2013)
- Fastest goal of the season in FA Cup: 2 minutes Ashaari against Penang FA (26 February 2013)
- Fastest goal of the season in Cup:
- Latest goal of the season in Super League: 90+2 minute, Farderin Kadir against T-Team FC (8 March 2013)
- Latest goal of the season in FA Cup: 89 minute Khairul Ramadhan against Penang FA (26 February 2013)
- Latest goal of the season in Cup:
- Biggest win of the season in Super League: 2–0 vs Perak FA (15 February 2013)
- Biggest win of the season in FA Cup: 3–0 vs Penang FA (26 February 2013)
- Biggest win of the season in Cup:
- Biggest loss of the season in Super League: 0–3 vs Pahang FA (22 January 2013)
- Biggest loss of the season in FA Cup:
- Biggest loss of the season in Cup:

== See also ==
- 2013 Malaysia Super League season
