= List of Malaysian football transfers 2014 =

The following is a list of transfers for 2014 Malaysian football.

== Malaysia Super League ==
The 2014 Astro Malaysia Super League (also known as Astro Liga Super Malaysia 2014 in Malay and the Astro Malaysia Super League due to the sponsorship from Astro) is the 11th season of the highest Malaysian football league since its inception in 2004. Twelve teams participated in the league with Singapore LIONSXII as the defending champions.

Teams participating in the 2014 AFC Cup (Kelantan FA and Selangor FA) can employ one extra foreign players, as the AFC allows four foreign players, of which one of them must be an Asian player, but the fourth foreign players are only allowed to play in the AFC Cup 2014 Tournament.

LionsXII will not be permitted to have any foreign players as it is intended to remain as a development team for Singaporean players.

FAM allow three foreign players quota starts season 2014, and one must be from Asian countries.

== ATM FA ==
=== Transfers in ===
Entry date	Position	No	Player	From club	Fee
	GK		(Malaysia) Syed Adney	(Malaysia) Terengganu FA	
	GK		(Malaysia) Mohd Iqbal Suhaimi	(Malaysia) T-Team F.C.	
	GK		(Malaysia) Muhd Faiz Abdul Khalid	(Malaysia) Selangor FA	
	DR		(Malaysia) Mohd Riduwan Ma'on	(Malaysia) FELDA United F.C.	
	DC		(Australia) Spase Dilevski	(Australia) Melbourne Victory	
	DC		(Malaysia) Badrul Hisham Mohd Sufian	(Malaysia) TLDM F.C.	
	DC		(Malaysia) Faiz Mohd Bandong	(Malaysia) UKM F.C.	
	DL		(Malaysia) Mohd Helmi Mohd Rafi	(Malaysia) Kuala Lumpur FA	
	DC		(Malaysia) Arvind a/l Juresinggam	(Malaysia) Selangor FA	
	ML		(Malaysia) Mohd Akmal Mohd Noor	(Malaysia) FELDA United F.C.	
	MC		(Malaysia) Ahmad Fauzi Saari	(Malaysia) FELDA United F.C.	
	DRC		(Malaysia) Khishan Raj a/l Mohana Raj	(Malaysia) Selangor FA	
	AMC		(Malaysia) Amirul Hakeem Abdul Rahman	(Malaysia) Negeri Sembilan FA	
	AMR		(Malaysia) Mohd Azrul Ahmad	(Malaysia) FELDA United F.C.	
	ST		(Malaysia) Rudie Ramli	(Malaysia) FELDA United F.C.	
	ST		(Argentina) Juan Arostegui	(Argentina) Sportivo Belgrano	
	ST		(Malaysia) Muhammad Haikal Zol	(Malaysia) Shahzan Muda F.C.	
	ST		(Malaysia) Ibrahim Suhaib Mohamad	(Malaysia) UiTM F.C.	
	AML		(Malaysia) Pavithran a/l Pandian	(Malaysia) Kuala Lumpur FA	

=== Transfers out ===
Exit date	Position	No.	Player	To club	Fee
	DMC		(Malaysia) Muhammad Shukor Adan	(Malaysia) Felda United	
	GK		(Malaysia) Mohd Farizal Harun	(Malaysia) Felda United	
	DR		(Malaysia) A. Varanthan	(Malaysia) Sabah	
	GK		(Malaysia) G. Jeevananthan	(Malaysia) Penang FA	
	DL		(Malaysia) Syafiq Azri Ahmad Kamal	(Malaysia) Penang FA	
	DC		(Malaysia) Suhhaimi Ishak	Released	
	MR		(Malaysia) Mohd Fainizam Nordin	(Malaysia) TUDM FC	
	ST		(Malaysia) Mohd Nizaruddin Yusof	(Malaysia) MOF F.C.	

== Johor Darul Takzim ==
=== Transfers in ===
Entry date	Position	No	Player	From club	Fee
	MC		(Singapore) Hariss Harun	(Singapore) LionsXII	
	DC		(Singapore) Baihakki Khaizan	(Singapore) LionsXII	
	DC		(Malaysia) Azizi Matt Rose	(Malaysia) Kelantan	
	DC		(Malaysia) Mohd Izuan Jarudin	(Malaysia) Johor	
	DRLC		(Malaysia) S. Subramaniam	(Malaysia) Kelantan	
	DMC		(Malaysia) Mohd Shakir Shaari	(Malaysia) Kelantan	
	DRLC		(Malaysia) Mohd Daudsu Jamaluddin	(Malaysia) Kelantan	
	DLC		(Malaysia) Mohd Fadhli Mohd Shas	(Malaysia) Harimau Muda A	
	MC		(Malaysia) Mohd Irfan Fazail	(Malaysia) Harimau Muda A	
	GK		(Malaysia) Mohd Izham Tarmizi	(Malaysia) Harimau Muda A	
	DR		(Malaysia) Mahali Jasuli	(Malaysia) Selangor	
	DL		(Malaysia) Mohd Asraruddin Putra Omar	(Malaysia) Selangor	
	GK		(Malaysia) Norazlan Razali	(Malaysia) Selangor	
	AMRC		(Malaysia) Mohd Amri Yahyah	(Malaysia) Selangor	
	AMC		(Argentina) Pablo Aimar	(Portugal) Benfica	
	AMRC		(Malaysia) Mohd Amirul Hadi Zainal	(Malaysia) Pahang	
	AML		(Malaysia) Nazrin Nawi	(Malaysia) Negeri Sembilan	
	ST		(Argentina) Luciano Figueroa	(Greece) Panathinaikos	

=== Transfers out ===
Exit date	Position	No.	Player	To club	Fee
	Manager		(Singapore) Fandi Ahmad	(Singapore) LionsXII	
	ST		(Argentina) Leonel Núñez	(Greece) OFI	
	ST		(Malaysia) Norshahrul Idlan Talaha	Released Free Transfer @ Mudah.my	
	MC		(Brazil) Andrezinho	(Lithuania) Žalgiris Vilnius	
	ST		(Malaysia) Mohd Zaquan Adha	(Malaysia) Johor Darul Takzim II F.C.	
	DL		(Malaysia) Mohd Irfan Abdul Ghani	(Malaysia) T-Team F.C.	
	DR		(Malaysia) Muhd Tuah Iskandar	(Malaysia) Perak FA	
	DC		(Malaysia) Mohd Muslim Ahmad	(Malaysia) PDRM FA	
	DRC		(Malaysia) Muhd Nazri Ahmad	(Malaysia) Kelantan FA	
	DL		(Malaysia) Mohd Farid Ramli	(Malaysia) Sime Darby F.C.	
	ML		(Malaysia) K. Thanaraj	(Malaysia) Felda United F.C.	
	MC		(Malaysia) Mohd Musleyadi Mansor	Released	
	ST		(Malaysia) Mohd Azinee Taib	(Malaysia) Johor Darul Takzim II F.C.	
	GK		(Malaysia) Mohd Zamir Selamat	(Malaysia) PKNS	
	GK		(Malaysia) Zulfadhli Mohamed	(Malaysia) Johor Darul Takzim II F.C.	
	MC		(Malaysia) Ahmad Ezrie Shafizie Sazali	(Malaysia) PDRM	
	MC		(Malaysia) Mohd Redzuan Nawi	(Malaysia) Sabah	
	AMRL		(Malaysia) Mohd Ezaidy Khadar	(Malaysia) Sabah	

== Kelantan FA ==
=== Transfers in ===
Entry date	Position	No.	Player	From club	Fee
November 2013	Head coach		(England) Steve Darby	Free agent	
November 2013	DRC		(Malaysia) Muhd Nazri Ahmad	(Malaysia) Darul Takzim FC	
November 2013	DC		(Malaysia) Lim Choon Wee	(Malaysia) Kelantan Chinese FC	
November 2013	DR		(Malaysia) Muhd Aizat Jaini	(Malaysia) UiTM F.C.	
November 2013	DMC		(Malaysia) Amar Rohidan	(Malaysia) Felda United F.C.	
November 2013	AMR		(Malaysia) Famirul Asyraf Sayuti	(Malaysia) Sime Darby F.C.	
November 2013	ST		(Malaysia) Ahmad Shakir Mohd Ali	(Malaysia) Negeri Sembilan	
November 2013	DC		(Malaysia) Faizol Nazlin Sayuti	(Malaysia) Kelantan President's Cup	
November 2013	MC		(Egypt) Mohamed Shawky	(Iraq) Al Naft	
November 2013	AML		(Malaysia) Wan Zaharulnizam Zakaria	(Malaysia) Harimau Muda A	

=== Transfers out ===
Exit date	Position	No.	Player	To club	Fee
	Midfielder		(Australia) Dimitri Petratos	(Australia) Brisbane Roar	
	Defender		(Croatia) Lek Kćira	(Croatia) HNK Gorica	
	DRLC		(Malaysia) Mohd Daudsu Jamaluddin	(Malaysia) Johor Darul Takzim	
	DRLC		(Malaysia) S. Subramaniam	(Malaysia) Johor Darul Takzim	
	DMC		(Malaysia) Mohd Shakir Shaari	(Malaysia) Johor Darul Takzim	
	DC		(Malaysia) Mohd Rizal Fahmi Abdul Rosid	(Malaysia) Selangor	
	DL		(Malaysia) Mohd Zamri Ramli	Suspension	
	DC		(Malaysia) Mohamad Muzammel Madiran	(Malaysia) FELDA United U23	
	DR		(Malaysia) Wan Amirul Afiq Wan Abdul Rahman	(Malaysia) FELDA United U23	
	AMC		(Malaysia) Irwan Jasman Azhar	(Malaysia) FELDA United U21	
	ST		(Malaysia) Muhamad Raim Azmi	(Malaysia) FELDA United U23	
	ST		(Malaysia) Mohd Azyu Ikmal Che Mat Nor	(Malaysia) FELDA United U23	
	DL		(Malaysia) Mohd Qayyum Marjoni Sabil	(Malaysia) Harimau Muda A	
	ST		(Malaysia) Muhammad Ashnizan Daud	(Malaysia) Kuala Lumpur FA	
	AMRC		(Malaysia) Mohamad Faiz Mohd Nasir	(Malaysia) PBAPP	
	DC		(Malaysia) Muhd Khairudin Ramli	(Malaysia) FELDA United U23	
	AMLC		(Malaysia) Indra Putra Mahayuddin	(Malaysia) FELDA United	
	DC		(Malaysia) Azizi Matt Rose	(Malaysia) Johor Darul Takzim	
	AML		(Malaysia) Muhd Izuan Salahuddin	(Malaysia) Sime Darby	
	ST		(Malaysia) Mohd Haris Safwan Mohd Kamal	(Malaysia) FELDA United	
	DMC		(Malaysia) K. Nanthakumar	(Malaysia) Negeri Sembilan	
	AMC		(Malaysia) Zairo Anuar Zalani	(Malaysia) Terengganu	
	AMRC		(Malaysia) Mohd Nor Farhan Muhammad	(Malaysia) Terengganu	
	ST		(Nigeria) Dickson Nwakaeme	Pahang	

== Pahang FA ==
=== Transfers in ===
Entry date	Position	No.	Player	From club	Fee
	DC		(Pakistan) Zesh Rehman	(Hong Kong) Kitchee	
	ST		(Nigeria) Dickson Nwakaeme	(Malaysia) Kelantan	

=== Transfers out ===
Exit date	Position	No.	Player	To club	Fee
	Head coach		(Malaysia) Dollah Salleh	(Malaysia) PDRM	
	GK		(Malaysia) Rosfaizul Azuar Ali	(Malaysia) Kuantan	
	MC		(Malaysia) Muhd Nur Azam Abdul Azih	(Malaysia) HMB	
	AMRC		(Malaysia) Amirul Hadi Zainal	(Malaysia) JDT	
	MR		(Malaysia) Mohd Hazuan Daud	(Malaysia) PDRM	

== Perak FA ==
=== Transfers in ===
Entry date	Position	No.	Player	From club	Fee
	DC		(Burkina Faso) Martin Kafando	(Burkina Faso) Union Sportive des Forces Armées	
	GK		(Malaysia) Mohd Nor Haziq Aris	(Malaysia) UiTM F.C.	
	GK		(Malaysia) Razi Effendi Suhit	(Malaysia) PKNS F.C.	
	DLC		(Malaysia) Azmeer Yusof	(Malaysia) Negeri Sembilan FA	
	DR		(Malaysia) Muhamad Tuah Iskandar	(Malaysia) Johor Darul Takzim F.C.	
	DC		(Malaysia) Mohd Fazli Zulkifli	(Malaysia) Felda United F.C.	
	AMC		(Myanmar) Kyaw Zayar Win	(Myanmar) Kanbawza F.C.	
	AMLC		(Malaysia) Hardi Jaafar	Free agents	
	DL		(Malaysia) Mohd Idris Ahmad	(Malaysia) PDRM FA	
	MR		(Malaysia) Mohd Hidayat Amaruddin	(Malaysia) UiTM F.C.	
	ST		(Malaysia) Shahrizal Saad	(Malaysia) Felda United F.C.	
	DL		(Malaysia) Mohd Norhizwan Hassan	(Malaysia) UiTM F.C.	
	ST		(Bosnia and Herzegovina) Želimir Terkeš	(Croatia) NK Zadar	
	ST		(Brazil) Eliel da Cruz Guardiano	(Brazil) Cruzeiro Esporte Clube (Rio Grande do Sul)	

=== Transfers out ===
Exit date	Position	No.	Player	To club	Fee
	GK		(Malaysia) Farizal Marlias	(Malaysia) Selangor	
	ST		(Malaysia) Abdul Hadi Yahya	(Malaysia) Selangor	
	Manager		(Malaysia) Mohd Azraai Khor Abdullah	(Malaysia) T-Team	
	DC		(Brazil) Rafael Souza Silva Novais	(Malaysia) PDRM	
	ST		(Brazil) Paulo Rangel	(Malaysia) Selangor	
	ML		(Malaysia) Muhd Rafiuddin Rodin	(Malaysia) Penang	
	GK		(Malaysia) Khairul Amri Salehuddin	(Malaysia) Penang	
	DR		(Malaysia) V. Thirumurugan	(Malaysia) PDRM	
	DRC		(Malaysia) Shahrom Kalam	(Malaysia) Selangor	
	AMR		(Malaysia) Yong Kuong Yong	(Malaysia) Penang	
	AMRL		(Malaysia) S. Chanturu	(Malaysia) Sarawak	
	MC		(Malaysia) Shahrulnizam Mustapa	(Malaysia) Felda	

== PKNS ==
=== Transfers in ===
Entry date	Position	No.	Player	From club	Fee
November 2013	Head coach		(Malaysia) Wan Jamak Wan Hassan	Free agent	
November 2013	DC		(Indonesia) Hamka Hamzah	(Indonesia) Mitra Kukar	
November 2013	Forward		(Croatia) Karlo Primorac	(Malaysia) Sime Darby	
November 2013	GK		(Malaysia) Mohd Zamir Selamat	(Malaysia) JDT	
November 2013	LB		(Malaysia) Zaiful Abdul Hakim	(Malaysia) Selangor	
November 2013	DRLC		(Malaysia) Abdul Ghani Rahman	(Malaysia) Negeri Sembilan FA	
November 2013	MC		(Malaysia) Muhd Hardee Shamsuri	(Malaysia) Selangor	
November 2013	AMC		(Malaysia) Muhd Hafiz Abu Hassan	(Malaysia) Perlis FA	
November 2013	AMC		(Malaysia) Shafuan Adli Shaari	(Malaysia) T-Team	
November 2013	ML		(Malaysia) Mohd Norhafizzuan Jailani	(Malaysia) SPA F.C.	
November 2013	AMRL		(Croatia) Karlo Primorac	(Malaysia) Sime Darby FC	
November 2013	DMC		(Malaysia) Radzi Mohd Hussin	(Malaysia) Sabah	
November 2013	AMC		(Malaysia) Nik Syafiq Syazwan Nik Min	(Malaysia) UiTM F.C.	
November 2013	Forward		(South Korea) Kim Dong-Chan	(Indonesia) Persita Tangerang	
April 2014	AMRC		(Malaysia) Shahurain Abu Samah	(Malaysia) Felda United F.C.	

=== Transfers out ===
Exit date	Position	No.	Player	To club	Fee
November 2013	Head coach		(Malaysia) Abdul Rahman Ibrahim	(Malaysia) Terengganu	
November 2013	GK		(Malaysia) Razi Effendi Suhit	(Malaysia) Perak FA	
November 2013	RB		(Malaysia) P. Rajesh	(Malaysia) Selangor FA	
November 2013	DC		(Malaysia) Ahmad Azlan Zainal	(Malaysia) Terengganu	
November 2013	DMC		(Malaysia) Reeshafiq Alwi	(Malaysia) Sarawak FA	
November 2013	AMRC		(Slovakia) Roman Chmelo	(Indonesia) PSM Makassar	
November 2013	AMRC		(Malaysia) Lot Abu Hassan	(Malaysia) Sarawak FA	
November 2013	AMR		(Malaysia) Nor Hakim Hassan	(Malaysia) Terengganu (loan)	
November 2013	ST		(Malaysia) Mohd Nizad Ayub	(Malaysia) T-Team F.C.	
November 2013	ST		(Malaysia) Nurshamil Abdul Ghani	(Malaysia) Harimau Muda B	
January 2014	LB		(Malaysia) Zaiful Abdul Hakim	(Malaysia) Harimau Muda A	
January 2014	MC		(Malaysia) Muhd Hardee Shamsuri	(Malaysia) Harimau Muda B	
April 2014	AMRL		(Malaysia) Mohd Fazli Baharudin	(Malaysia) T-Team F.C.	
April 2014	MC		(Malaysia) Nazmi Faiz Mansor	(Malaysia) Selangor FA	

== Sarawak FA ==
=== Transfer In ===
Position	No.	Player	From club	Fee
DC		(Hungary) Gábor Gyepes	(Hungary) Videoton FC	
DMC		(Malaysia) Reeshafiq Alwi	(Malaysia) PKNS F.C.	
AMRC		(Malaysia) Lot Abu Hassan	(Malaysia) PKNS F.C.	
GK		(Malaysia) Mohd Fadzley Abdul Rahim	(Malaysia) DRB-Hicom F.C.	
AMRL		(Malaysia) S. Chanturu	(Malaysia) Perak FA	
AMRC		(Malaysia) Mohd Rasyid Aya	(Malaysia) JDT	
ST		(Malaysia) Akmal Rizal	(Malaysia) Kedah FA	
ST		(Serbia) Milorad Janjuš	(Vietnam) SHB Đà Nẵng F.C.	
ST		(Iran) Alireza Abbasfard	(Iran) Rah Ahan Sorinet FC	
ST		(Malaysia) Zamri Morshidi	(Malaysia) PKNS FC	
ST		(Australia) Ryan Griffiths	(Australia) Adelaide United	
ST		(Lebanon) Hassan Mohamad	(Lebanon) Al-Nejmeh SC	

=== Transfers out ===
Position	No.	Player	To club	Fee
ST		(Malaysia) Bobby Gonzales	(Malaysia) PDRM	
MC		(Malaysia) Mohd Azizan Baba	(Malaysia) Penang	
GK		(Malaysia) Saiful Amar Sudar	(Malaysia) Kedah FA	
DMC		(Cameroon) Guy Bwele	(Malaysia) Putrajaya SPA F.C.	
Defender		(Malaysia) Mohd Fareez Tukijo	Released	
DC		(Malaysia) Shahran Abdul Samad	Free agent	
Forward		(Malaysia) Ahmad Aminuddin Shaharudin	(Malaysia) Malacca United F.C.	
Midfielder		(Malaysia) Shahrul Abdul Malek	Free agent	
Midfielder		(Malaysia) Suppiah Chanturu	JDT FC	

== Selangor FA ==
=== Transfers in ===
Position	No.	Player	From club	Fee
Manager		(Australia) Mehmet Duraković	Free agent	
GK		(Malaysia) Mohd Farizal Marlias	(Malaysia) Perak	
GK		(Malaysia) Mohd Hamsani Ahmad	(Malaysia) Negeri Sembilan	
GK		(Malaysia) Muhd Syamim Othman	(Malaysia) Johor Darul Takzim II	
DL		(Malaysia) Mohd Azmi Muslim	(Malaysia) FELDA United	
DC		(Malaysia) Mohd Rizal Fahmi Abdul Rosid	(Malaysia) Kelantan	
DRC		(Malaysia) Muhd Shahrom Abdul Kalam	(Malaysia) Perak	
DR		(Malaysia) Mohd Shazlan Alias	(Malaysia) T-Team	
DR		(Malaysia) P. Rajesh	(Malaysia) PKNS	
DC		(Australia) Steve Pantelidis	(Australia) Perth Glory	
AMLC		(Brazil) Juninho	(Thailand) TOT	
AML		(Indonesia) Andik Vermansyah	(Indonesia) Persebaya	
ST		(Malaysia) Abdul Hadi Yahya	(Malaysia) Perak	
ST		(Malaysia) A. Thamil Arasu	(Malaysia) Harimau Muda A	
ST		(Malaysia) Ahmad Hazwan Bakri	(Malaysia) Harimau Muda A	
ST		(Brazil) Paulo Rangel	(Thailand) Muang Thong United	
DC		(Brazil) Evaldo Silva dos Santos	(Brazil) Villa Nova Atlético Clube	
MC		(Malaysia) Nazmi Faiz Mansor	(Malaysia) PKNS F.C.	

=== Transfers out ===
Position	No.	Player	To club	Fee
Manager		(Malaysia) Irfan Bakti Abu Salim	(Malaysia) Felda United	
GK		(Malaysia) Mohd Sharbinee Allawee Ramli	(Malaysia) Terengganu	
GK		(Malaysia) Norazlan Razali	(Malaysia) Johor Darul Takzim	
GK		(Malaysia) Damien Lim Chien Khai	(Malaysia) Harimau Muda A	
GK		(Malaysia) Izzat Abdul Rahim	(Malaysia) Putrajaya SPA F.C.	
GK		(Malaysia) Mohd Aniis Ismail	(Malaysia) Felda United F.C.	
GK		(Malaysia) Mohd Faiz Abdul Khalid	(Malaysia) ATM FA	
DR		(Malaysia) Mahali Jasuli	(Malaysia) Johor Darul Takzim	
DL		(Malaysia) Mohd Asraruddin Putra Omar	(Malaysia) Johor Darul Takzim	
DC		(Australia) Adam Griffith	(Malaysia) Kedah	
DC		(Malaysia) Mohd Fairuz Abdul Aziz	(Malaysia) Sime Darby	
DC		(Malaysia) Mohd Nasriq Baharom	(Malaysia) Felda United F.C.	
DR		(Malaysia) Mohd Rafiq Shah Zaim	(Malaysia) Sime Darby F.C.	
DL		(Malaysia) Zain Azraai Sulaiman	(Malaysia) PDRM FA	
DC		(Malaysia) Muhd Farid Azmi	(Malaysia) Felda United F.C.	
DC		(Malaysia) J. Arvind	(Malaysia) ATM FA	
DRC		(Malaysia) Khishan Raj a/l Mohana Raj	(Malaysia) ATM FA	
DR		(Malaysia) Mohd Faizul Asraf Mahadi	Released	
DC		(Malaysia) Mohamad Nurfitah Md Shah	(Malaysia) Johor Darul Takzim II F.C.	
DL		(Malaysia) Zaiful Abdul Hakim	(Malaysia) PKNS F.C.	
MR		(Malaysia) Solehin Kanasian Abdullah	(Malaysia) Felda United	
MLC		(Malaysia) Adib Aizuddin Abdul Latif	(Malaysia) Felda United	
ML		(Malaysia) V. Kavi Chelvan	(Malaysia) Negeri Sembilan	
AMC		(Malaysia) K. Satish	(Malaysia) Harimau Muda A	
ML		(Malaysia) Muhd Hardee Shamsuri	(Malaysia) PKNS F.C.	
DMC		(Malaysia) Saiful Hasnol Mohd Raffi	Released	
DL		(Malaysia) Wan Zulhilmi Man Mustafa	(Malaysia) Perlis FA	
ML		(Malaysia) Mohd Shukor Azmi	(Malaysia) Perlis FA	
AMC		(Malaysia) Muhd Hafiz Abu Hassan	(Malaysia) PKNS F.C.	
ST		(Malaysia) Wan Mohd Hoesne Wan Hussain	(Malaysia) Sabah	
AMRC		(Malaysia) Mohd Amri Yahyah	(Malaysia) Johor Darul Takzim	
ST		(Malaysia) Mohd Ramzul Zahini Adnan	(Malaysia) T-Team	
ST		(Liberia) Francis Forkey Doe	(Malaysia) Kelantan	
ST		(Malaysia) Nazrul Kamaruzaman	(Malaysia) Sime Darby F.C.	
ST		(Malaysia) Muhd Asnan Awal Hisham	(Malaysia) Sime Darby F.C.	
ST		(Malaysia) Muhd Arif Mohd Anwar	(Malaysia) Harimau Muda A	
ST		(Malaysia) Mohd Israq Zakaria	Released	
ST		(Malaysia) Haziq Fikri Hussein	(Malaysia) PDRM FA	
ST		(Malaysia) Wong Kah Heng	Released	
ST		(Malaysia) Muhammad Zuhair	(Malaysia) Sime Darby F.C.	

== Sime Darby FC ==
=== Transfers in ===
Entry date	Position	No.	Player	From club	Fee
	AML		(Malaysia) Muhd Izuan Salahuddin	(Malaysia) Kelantan	
	DC		(Ghana) William Mensah	(Egypt) Wadi Degla FC	
	DC		(Malaysia) Mohd Nashriq Yahya	(Malaysia) Harimau Muda B	
	DC		(Malaysia) Mohd Fairuz Abdul Aziz	(Malaysia) Selangor FA	
	DC		(Malaysia) Mohd Farid Ramli	(Malaysia) Johor Darul Takzim F.C.	
	DR		(Malaysia) Mohd Rafiq Shah Zaim	(Malaysia) Selangor FA	
	MC		(Uzbekistan) Dilshod Sharofetdinov	(Uzbekistan) Pakhtakor FK (Tashkent)	
	AMC		(Syria) Mahmoud Amnah	(Iraq) Sulaymaniyah FC	
	DMC		(Malaysia) Nur Areff Kamaruddin	(Malaysia) Harimau Muda B	
	AMR		(Malaysia) Mohd Rafizi Hamdan	(Malaysia) Negeri Sembilan FA	
	ST		(Ghana) Wisdom Agblexo	(Lebanon) Al-Ansar SC	
	ST		(Malaysia) Failee Ghazli	(Malaysia) Perak FA	
	ST		(Malaysia) Farderin Kadir	(Malaysia) Terengganu FA	
	ST		(Malaysia) Muhd Asnan Awal Hisham	(Malaysia) Selangor FA	
	ST		(Malaysia) Nazrul Kamaruzaman	(Malaysia) Selangor FA	
April 2014	ST		(Croatia) Mateo Roskam	(Malaysia) NK Slaven Belupo	

=== Transfers out ===
Exit date	Position	No.	Player	To club	Fee
	ST		(Croatia) Karlo Primorac	(Malaysia) PKNS	
	ST		(Malaysia) Muhamad Zamri Chin	(Malaysia) Penang	
	DC		(Malaysia) Mohd Hasmarul Fadzir Hassan	Released	
	DC		(Malaysia) Bashahrul Abu Bakar	Released	
	DL		(Malaysia) Mohd Faizal Nasir	(Malaysia) Perlis FA	
	DC		(Malaysia) Mohd Khairi Zainuddin	(Malaysia) Perlis FA	
	AMRC		(Malaysia) Mohd Yusof Zainal Abidin	(Malaysia) Johor Darul Takzim II F.C.	
	AMR		(Malaysia) Famirul Asyraf Sayuti	(Malaysia) Kelantan FA	
	MC		(Togo) Togaba Kontiwa Komlan	Released	
	ST		(Malaysia) K. Ravindran	(Malaysia) PBAPP FC	

== LionsXII ==
=== Transfers in ===
Entry date	Position	No.	Player	From club	Fee
	Head coach		(Singapore) Fandi Ahmad	Free agent	
	DC		(Singapore) Afiq Yunos	(Singapore) Courts Young Lions	
	Defender		(Singapore) Emmeric Ong	(Singapore) Courts Young Lions	
	DC		(Singapore) Faliq Sudhir	(Singapore) Admiralty FC	
	MF		(Singapore) Firdaus Kasman	(Singapore) Tampines Rovers FC	
	MF		(Singapore) Samuel Benjamin Nadarajah	(Singapore) Courts Young Lions	
	MF		(Singapore) Ignatius Ang	(Singapore) Courts Young Lions	
	GK		(Singapore) Abdul Qadir Yusoff	(Singapore) Courts Young Lions	
	ST		(Singapore) Khairul Amri	(Singapore) Tampines Rovers FC	
	ST		(Singapore) Sufian Anuar	(Singapore) Warriors FC	

=== Transfers out ===
Exit date	Position	No.	Player	To club	Fee
	Defender		(Singapore) Baihakki Khaizan	(Malaysia) Johor Darul Takzim F.C.	
	Manager		(Singapore) V. Sundramoorthy	(Malaysia) Negeri Sembilan	
	Midfielder		(Singapore) Hariss Harun	(Malaysia) Johor Darul Takzim	
	Midfielder		(Singapore) Shahril Ishak	(Malaysia) Johor Darul Takzim II F.C.	
	DF		(Singapore) Faris Azienuddin	(Singapore) Courts Young Lions	
	DF		(Singapore) Irwan Shah	(Singapore) Warriors FC	
	DF		(Singapore) Ali Hudzaifi yusof	(Singapore) Courts Young Lions	
	DF		(Singapore) Fariss Hamran	(Singapore) Balestier Khalsa FC	
	Midfielder		(Singapore) Fazli Ayob	(Singapore) Home United FC	
	Midfielder		(Singapore) Izzdin Shafiq	(Singapore) Home United FC	
	Forward		(Singapore) Fazrul Nawaz	(Singapore) Home United FC	
	Forward		(Singapore) Randy Pay	(Singapore) Balestier Khalsa FC	
	Forward		(Singapore) Iqbal Hamid Hussain	(Singapore) Courts Young Lions	
	MF		(Singapore) Safirul Sulaiman	(Singapore) Courts Young Lions	
	GK		(Singapore) Muhd Neezam Abdul Aziz	(Singapore) Warriors FC	
	GK		(Singapore) Syed Sufiyan Syed Sulaiman	Released	

== Terengganu FA ==
=== Transfers in ===
Entry date	Position	No.	Player	From club	Fee
	Manager		(Malaysia) Abdul Rahman Ibrahim	(Malaysia) PKNS	
	AMLC		(Malaysia) Zairo Anuar Zalani	(Malaysia) Kelantan	
	ST		(Malaysia) Izzaq Faris Ramlan	(Malaysia) Harimau Muda A	
	DC		(Malaysia) Ahmad Azlan Zainal	(Malaysia) PKNS	
	DR		(Malaysia) Mazlizam Mohamad	(Malaysia) T-Team	
	GK		(Malaysia) Sharbinee Allawee	(Malaysia) Selangor	
	AMR		(Malaysia) Nor Hakim Hassan	(Malaysia) PKNS	
	GK		(Malaysia) Izzuddin Hussin	(Malaysia) Terengganu President's Cup	
	AMRC		(Malaysia) Nor Farhan Muhammad	(Malaysia) Kelantan FA	
	AMRL		(Malaysia) Mohd Faiz Subri	(Malaysia) Kelantan FA	
	MC		(Australia) Mario Karlović	(Indonesia) Persebaya Surabaya	
	ST		(Brazil) Márcio Souza Da Silva	(Indonesia) Perseman Manokwari	
	ST		(Guinea) Mamadou Barry	(Hong Kong) South China AA	
April 2014	ST		(Senegal) Moustapha Dabo	(Turkey) Kahramanmaraşspor	
April 2014	ST		(Colombia) Javier Estupiñán	(Honduras) Parrillas One	

=== Transfers out ===
Exit date	Position	No.	Player	To club	Fee
	Goalkeeper		(Malaysia) Wan Azraie Wan Teh	(Malaysia) T-Team	
	Defender		(Malaysia) Mohd Faizal Muhammad	(Malaysia) T-Team	
	Forward		(Cameroon) Jean-Emmanuel Effa Owona	Negeri Sembilan FA	
	DR		(Malaysia) Qhairul Anwar Roslani	(Malaysia) Felda United F.C.	
	DRC		(Malaysia) Wan Muhd Firdaus Wan Demi	(Malaysia) Kuantan FA	
	Defender		(Malaysia) Ahmad Abdul Fattah Abdullah	(Malaysia) Kuantan FA	
	DMC		(Malaysia) Khairan Ezuan Razali	(Malaysia) T-Team	
	AMR		(Malaysia) Shamsul Kamal Mohamad	(Malaysia) T-Team	
	AMRL		(Malaysia) G. Puaneswaran	(Malaysia) Negeri Sembilan FA	
	ST		(Malaysia) Farderin Kadir	(Malaysia) Sime Darby F.C.	
	ST		(Malaysia) Mohd Fahmi Izzuddin Mohd Zuki	(Malaysia) Kuantan FA	
	ST		(Malaysia) Muhd Zul Helmi Jamaluddin	(Malaysia) Kuantan FA	
	Assistant Coach		(Malaysia) Rosdi Talib	(Malaysia) Hanelang F.C.	
	GK		(Malaysia) Syed Adney	(Malaysia) ATM FA	
	GK		(Malaysia) Mohd Shahrul Nizam Mohd Shukri	(Malaysia) T-Team	
	MF		(Malaysia) Mohd Hasrol Syawal Hamid	(Malaysia) T-Team	
	MF		(Malaysia) Mohd Ramzi Sufian	(Malaysia) Harimau Muda B	
April 2014	DL		(Malaysia) Nik Zul Aziz Nawawi	(Malaysia) T-Team	

== T-Team FC ==
=== Transfers in ===
Entry date	Position	No.	Player	From club	Fee
	ST		(Indonesia) Patrich Wanggai	(Indonesia) Persipura Jayapura	
	DRC		(Malaysia) Muhd Hazwan Rahman	(Malaysia) Harimau Muda A	
	DRC		(Malaysia) Shahril Faizal Ahmad Sharifuddin	(Malaysia) Sabah FA	
	GK		(Malaysia) Wan Azraie Wan Teh	(Malaysia) Terengganu	
	DC		(Malaysia) Mohd Faizal Muhammad	(Malaysia) Terengganu	
	ST		(Malaysia) Azlan Ismail	(Malaysia) Perak	
	D/MRL		(Malaysia) Alto Linus	(Malaysia) Sabah	
	DMC		(Malaysia) Khairan Ezuan Razali	(Malaysia) Terengganu	
	AMR		(Malaysia) Shamsul Kamal Mohamad	(Malaysia) Terengganu	
	ST		(Malaysia) Hattaphon Bun An	(Malaysia) Kedah	
	ST		(Malaysia) Mohd Nizad Ayub	(Malaysia) PKNS F.C.	
	ST		(Malaysia) Ramzul Zahini Adnan	(Malaysia) Selangor	
	GK		(Malaysia) Mohd Shahril Saa'ri	(Malaysia) Sabah	
	DL		(Malaysia) Mohd Irfan Abdul Ghani	(Malaysia) Johor Darul Takzim F.C.	
	ST		(Brazil) Evaldo Gonçalves	(Vietnam) Hoàng Anh Gia Lai F.C.	
	MC		(Chile) Nelson San Martín	(Malaysia) Kedah FA	
	DC		(Brazil) Fábio Flor de Azevedo	(Bahrain) Busaiteen Club	
	GK		(Malaysia) Mohd Shahrul Nizam Mohd Shukri	(Malaysia) Terengganu FA	
	DC		(Malaysia) Mohd Arif Fadzilah Abu Bakar	(Malaysia) Harimau Muda C	
	DC		(Malaysia) Muhammad bin Mohd Fauzi	(Malaysia) Harimau Muda C	
	DR		(Malaysia) Muhammad Naqib Najwan Saufi	(Malaysia) Bukit Jalil Sports School	
	AMR		(Malaysia) Mohd Hasrol Syawal Hamid	(Malaysia) Terengganu FA	
	AMC		(Malaysia) Muhd Azalinullah Muhd Alias	(Malaysia) Harimau Muda C	
	ST		(Malaysia) Mohd Akram Asidi	(Malaysia) Bukit Jalil Sports School	
April 2014	DL		(Malaysia) Nik Zul Aziz Nawawi	(Malaysia) Terengganu	
April 2014	AMRL		(Malaysia) Mohd Fazli Baharudin	(Malaysia) PKNS F.C.	
April 2014	AMRC		(Brazil) Leandro Dos Santos	(Thailand) Bangkok Glass F.C.	
April 2014	ST		(Rwanda) Jimmy Mulisa	(Belgium) A.F.C. Tubize	
April 2014	DC		(Australia) Goran Šubara	(Thailand) Bangkok Glass F.C.	
	Manager		(Malaysia) Mohd Azraai Khor Abdullah	(Malaysia) Perak	

=== Transfers out ===
Exit date	Position	No.	Player	To club	Fee
	GK		(Malaysia) Mohd Amirul Abu Seman	(Malaysia) Perlis FA	
	GK		(Malaysia) Mohd Iqbal Suhaimi	(Malaysia) ATM FA	
	DR		(Malaysia) Mohd Shazlan Alias	(Malaysia) Selangor FA	
	DL		(Malaysia) Mohd Aizulridzwan Razali	(Malaysia) Felda United F.C.	
	AML		(Malaysia) Isma Alif Mohd Salim	(Malaysia) Sabah FA	
	AMRC		(Malaysia) Mohd Saiful Mustafa	(Malaysia) Malacca United F.C.	
	MC		(Malaysia) Shafuan Adli Shaari	(Malaysia) PKNS F.C.	
	AML		(Malaysia) Pritam Singh Charun Singh	(Malaysia) Sabah	
	AMLR		(Malaysia) Ahmad Syamim Yahya	(Malaysia) Felda United F.C.	
	AMR		(Malaysia) Muhamad Naim Zakaria	(Malaysia) Harimau Muda B	
	ST		(Bosnia and Herzegovina) Damir Ibrić	Released	
	AMR/ST		(Malaysia) Mohd Yusri Abas	(Malaysia) Malacca United F.C.	
	ST		(Malaysia) Fazuan Abdullah	(Malaysia) Perlis FA	
	D/DMC		(Malaysia) G. Mahathevan	(Malaysia) Penang	
	ST		(Malaysia) Abdul Latiff Suhaimi	(Malaysia) Felda United F.C.	
	DR		(Malaysia) Mazlizam Mohamad	(Malaysia) Terengganu	

== Malaysia Premier League ==
The 2014 Malaysia Premier League is the eleventh season of the second division in the Malaysian football league since its establishment in 2004.

FAM allow three foreign players quota starts season 2014, and one must be from Asian countries.

== Felda United FC ==
=== Transfers in ===
Entry date	Position	No.	Player	From club	Fee
	D/DMC		(Malaysia) Muhammad Shukor Adan	(Malaysia) ATM	
	GK		(Malaysia) Mohd Farizal Harun	(Malaysia) ATM	
	GK		(Malaysia) Mohd Fairul Azwan Shahrullai	(Malaysia) Selangor FA	
	GK		(Malaysia) Mohd Soffuan Tawil	(Malaysia) Putrajaya SPA F.C.	
	AMLC/ST		(Malaysia) Indra Putra Mahayuddin	(Malaysia) Kelantan	
	ST		(Malaysia) Mohd Haris Safwan Mohd Kamal	(Malaysia) Kelantan	
	AMC		(Liberia) Zah Rahan Krangar	(Indonesia) Persipura Jayapura	
	DC		(Malaysia) Mohd Nasriq Baharom	(Malaysia) Selangor	
	AMR		(Malaysia) Solehin Kanasian Abdullah	(Malaysia) Selangor	
	D/ML		(Malaysia) Adib Aizuddin Abdul Latif	(Malaysia) Selangor	
	MC		(Malaysia) Mohd Syahid Zaidon	(Malaysia) Harimau Muda A	
	Head Coach		(Malaysia) Irfan Bakti Abu Salim	(Malaysia) Selangor	
	AMRC/ST		(Malaysia) Shahurain Abu Samah	(Malaysia) Negeri Sembilan FA	
	DC		(Uzbekistan) Yaroslav Krushelnitskiy	(Uzbekistan) FC Shurtan Guzar	
	DR		(Malaysia) Qhairul Anwar Roslani	(Malaysia) Terengganu FA	
	DRL		(Malaysia) Hasni Zaidi Jamian	(Malaysia) Johor FA	
	DL		(Malaysia) Mohd Aizul Ridzwan Razali	(Malaysia) T-Team F.C.	
	D/MC		(Malaysia) Mohd Khairul Ismail	(Malaysia) Johor FA	
	MC		(Malaysia) Shahrulnizam Mustapa	(Malaysia) Perak FA	
	AML/ST		(Malaysia) Ahmad Syamim Yahya	(Malaysia) T-Team FC	
	AML		(Malaysia) K. Thanaraj	(Malaysia) Johor Darul Takzim F.C.	
	AMRL		(Malaysia) Mohd Asyraf Al-Japri	(Malaysia) Putrajaya SPA F.C.	
	ST		(Malaysia) Abdul Latiff Suhaimi	(Malaysia) T-Team FC	
	ST		(Liberia) Edward Junior Wilson	(Indonesia) Semen Padang F.C.	
April 2014	ST		(Australia) Ndumba Makeche	(Australia) Perth Glory FC	
April 2014	AMRL		(Malaysia) Mohd Raimi Mohd Nor	(Malaysia) Selangor FA	

=== Transfers out ===
Exit date	Position	No.	Player	To club	Fee
	Midfielder		(Malaysia) Azi Shahril Azmi	(Malaysia) PDRM	

== Johor Darul Takzim II ==
=== Transfers in ===
Entry date	Position	No.	Juan Mata	From club	Fee
	Defender		(Singapore) Baihakki Khaizan	(Singapore) LionsXII	
	Forward		(Malaysia) Mohd Zaquan Adha Abdul Radzak	(Malaysia) Johor Darul Takzim	
	Forward		(Singapore) Shahril Ishak	(Singapore) LionsXII	

=== Transfers out ===
Exit date	Position	No.	Player	To club	Fee
	Goalkeeper		(Malaysia) Mohd Fazli Paat	(Malaysia) Sabah	

== Kedah FA ==
=== Transfer in ===
Billy Mehmet Saiful Amar Sudar Franco Gomez Nam Kung Woong

=== Transfers out ===
Exit date	Position	No.	Player	To club	Fee
	Forward		(Croatia) Alen Guć	(Malaysia) Putrajaya SPA F.C.	
	Forward		(Malaysia) Akmal Rizal Ahmad Rakhli	(Malaysia) Sarawak	
	Defender		(Malaysia) Mohd Sabre Mat Abu	(Malaysia) PDRM	
	Defender		(Malaysia) Hariri Mohd Safii	(Malaysia) Penang	
	Midfielder		(Malaysia) Mohd Shazuan Mohd Ashraf Mathews	(Malaysia) Penang	
	Midfielder		(Malaysia) Henry Lew Han Hung	(Malaysia) Penang	
	Defender		(Malaysia) Arman Fareez Mohd Ali	(Malaysia) PDRM	

== Negeri Sembilan FA ==
=== Transfers in ===
Entry date	Position	No.	Player	From club	Fee
	Manager		(Singapore) V. Sundramoorthy	(Singapore) LionsXII	
	Forward		(Slovakia) Jozef Kapláň	(Singapore) Geylang United	
	Midfielder		(Malaysia) M. Sivakumar	(Malaysia) Perak	
	Midfielder		(Malaysia) G. Puaneswaran	(Malaysia) Terengganu	
	Defender		(Malaysia) K. Nanthakumar	(Malaysia) Kelantan	
	Midfielder		(Malaysia)	(Malaysia)	

=== Transfers out ===
Exit date	Position	No.	Player	To club	Fee
	Midfielder		(Malaysia) Nazrin Nawi	(Malaysia) Johor Darul Takzim	
	Goalkeeper		(Malaysia) Mohd Hamsani Ahmad	(Malaysia) Selangor	
	Forward		(Malaysia) Ahmad Shakir Mohd Ali	(Malaysia) Kelantan	

== PBAPP FC ==
=== Transfers in ===
Entry date	Position	No.	Player	From club	Fee

=== Transfers out ===
Exit date	Position	No.	Player	To club	Fee

== PDRM FA ==
=== Transfers in ===
Entry date	Position	No.	Player	From club	Fee
	Forward		(Maldives) Ali Ashfaq	(Maldives) New Radiant SC	
	Forward		(Malaysia) Bobby Gonzales	(Malaysia) Sarawak	
	Head coach		(Malaysia) Dollah Salleh	(Malaysia) Pahang	
	Midfielder		(Malaysia) Ahmad Ezrie Shafizie	(Malaysia) Johor Darul Takzim	
	Defender		(Malaysia) Mohd Sabre Mat Abu	(Malaysia) Kedah	
	Defender		(Malaysia) Arman Fareez Tongkat Ali	(Malaysia) Kedah	
	Defender		(Brazil) Rafael Souza Silva Novais	(Malaysia) Perak	
	Defender		(Malaysia) Thirumurugan s/o Veeran	(Malaysia) Perak	
	Midfielder		(Malaysia) Azi Shahril Azmi	(Malaysia) FELDA United	
	Forward		(Malaysia) Abdul Latiff Suhaimi	(Malaysia) T-Team	
	Goalkeeper		(Malaysia) Azizon Abdul Kadir	(Malaysia) Kuala Lumpur	

=== Transfers out ===
Exit date	Position	No.	Player	To club	Fee

== Penang FA ==
=== Transfers in ===
Entry date	Position	No.	Player	From club	Fee
	Head coach		(Malaysia) K. Devan	Free agent	
	Midfielder		(Malaysia) Muhd Rafiuddin Rodin	(Malaysia) Perak	
	Goalkeeper		(Malaysia) Khairul Amri Salehuddin	(Malaysia) Perak	
	Midfielder		(Malaysia) Mohd Shazuan Mohd Ashraf Mathews	(Malaysia) Kedah	
	Defender		(Malaysia) Hariri Mohd Safii	(Malaysia) Kedah	
	Defender		(Malaysia) G. Mahathevan	(Malaysia) T-Team	
	Forward		(Malaysia) Muhamad Zamri Chin	(Malaysia) Sime Darby	
	Midfielder		(Malaysia) Mohd Azizan Baba	(Malaysia) Sarawak	
	Midfielder		(Malaysia) Lew Han Hung	(Malaysia) Kedah President's Cup	
	Midfielder		(Malaysia) Yong Kuong Yong	(Malaysia) Perak	
	Goalkeeper		(Malaysia) G. Jeevananthan	(Malaysia) ATM	
	Defender		(Malaysia) Syafiq Azri Ahmad Kamal	(Malaysia) ATM	
	Midfielder		(South Korea) Lee Kil-Hoon	Hong Kong Rangers	
	Forward		(Brazil) Hilton Moreira	(Indonesia) Sriwijaya	
	Defender		(South Korea) Lee Kwang-Hyun	(South Korea) Daejeon Citizen	
	Forward		(Angola) Titi Buengo	(Greece) Olympiacos Volos	

=== Transfers out ===
Exit date	Position	No.	Player	To club	Fee
	Goalkeeper		(Malaysia) Mohd Solehin Rodzi	(Malaysia) DRB-Hicom F.C.	
	Defender		(Malaysia) Mohd Fitri Jamaluddin	(Malaysia) Perlis FA	
	Defender		(Malaysia) Danial Fadzly Abdullah	Retired	
	Midfielder		(Malaysia) Hafiz Che Hassan	Free agent	
	Midfielder		(Malaysia) Khairul Anwar Idris	Released	
	Midfielder		(Malaysia) Azrul Abdul Rahim	Released	
	Midfielder		(Malaysia) A. Giri Ther	(Malaysia) MISC-MIFA	
	Midfielder		(Malaysia) Mohd Hisyam Shofi	Free agent	
	Midfielder		(Malaysia) Mohd Syafuan Riduwan	(Malaysia) Johor Darul Takzim II	
	Forward		(Malaysia) Mohd Aminuddin Azmi	(Malaysia) UiTM	
	Forward		(Malaysia) Mohd Haslan Abu Hassan	Free agent	

== Perlis FA ==
=== Transfers in ===
Entry date	striker	10.	leonel messi	barcelona	Free

=== Transfers out ===
Exit date	Position	No.	Player	To club	Fee

== DRB-Hicom FC ==
=== Transfers in ===
Entry date	Position	No.	Player	From club	Fee
	Defender		(Malaysia) Khairul Anwar Shahrudin	(Malaysia) Malacca United	
	Forward		(Malaysia) Fakhrullah Rosli	(Malaysia) Malacca United	
20 March 2014	Defender	41	(South Korea) Kwon Jun	(Thailand) BEC Tero Sasana	Free

=== Transfers out ===
Exit date	Position	No.	Player	To club	Fee

== Putrajaya SPA FC ==
=== Transfers in ===
Entry date	Position	No.	Player	From club	Fee

== Sabah FA ==
=== Transfers in ===
Entry date	Position	No.	Player	From club	Fee
	Forward		(Serbia) Altin Grbović	(Bosnia and Herzegovina) NK Zvijezda Gradačac	
	Midfielder		(Australia) Srećko Mitrović	(Indonesia) Deltras	
	Defender		(Croatia) Predrag Počuča	(Albania) Besa Kavajë	
	Goalkeeper		(Malaysia) Mohd Fazli Paat	(Malaysia) Johor	
	Defender		(Malaysia) A. Varanthan	(Malaysia) ATM	
	Midfielder		(Malaysia) Mohd Hasmarul Fadzir Hassan	(Malaysia) PKNS	
	Midfielder		(Malaysia) Mohd Redzuan Nawi	(Malaysia) Johor Darul Takzim	
	Forward		(Malaysia) Mohd Ezaidy Khadar	(Malaysia) Johor Darul Takzim	
	Forward		(Malaysia) Rozaimi Abdul Rahman	(Malaysia) Harimau Muda A	

=== Transfers out ===
Exit date	Position	No.	Player	To club	Fee
	Defender		(Malaysia) Sumardi Hajalan	(Malaysia) Negeri Sembilan	
	Defender		(Malaysia)	(Malaysia)	

== UiTM FC ==
=== Transfers in ===
Entry date	Position	No.	Player	From club	Fee
	Head coach		(Malaysia) Azuan Zain	Free agent	
	Defender		(Malaysia)	(Malaysia)	

=== Transfers out ===
Exit date	Position	No.	Player	To club	Fee
	Head coach		(Malaysia) Azman Eusoff	Free agent	

== Harimau Muda B ==
=== Transfers in ===
Entry date	Position	No.	Player	From club	Fee

== Malaysia FAM League ==
The 2014 Malaysia FAM League (referred to as the FAM League) is the 62nd season of the FAM League since its establishment in 1952. The league is currently the third level football league in Malaysia.

== Malacca United F.C. ==
=== Transfers in ===
Entry date	Position	No.	Player	From club	Fee
	Manager		(Slovakia) Ladislav Totkovič	Free agent	
	Midfielder		(Malaysia) Rashid Mahmud	(Malaysia) Negeri Sembilan	

=== Transfers out ===
Exit date	Position	No.	Player	To club	Fee
	Defender		(Malaysia) Khairul Anwar Shahrudin	(Malaysia) DRB-Hicom	
	Forward		(Malaysia) Fakhrullah Rosli	(Malaysia) DRB-Hicom	

== Kuala Lumpur FA ==
=== Transfers in ===
Entry date	Position	No.	Player	From club	Fee

=== Transfers out ===
Exit date	Position	No.	Player	To club	Fee
	Goalkeeper		(Malaysia) Azizon Abdul Kadir	(Malaysia) PDRM	

== Harimau Muda C ==
=== Transfers in ===
Entry date	Position	No.	Player	From club	Fee
	GK		(Malaysia) Muhd Azam Jais	(Malaysia) SSTMI	
	GK		(Malaysia) Mohd Mursyidin Maudoode	(Malaysia) Johor Darul Takzim II F.C. On Loan	
	DF		(Malaysia) Sanjef Dinesh a/l R.S. Baskeran	(Malaysia) Penang FA	
	DF		(Malaysia) Awangku Mohamad Hamirullizam	(Malaysia) Sabah FA	
	MF		(Malaysia) Dominic Tan Jun Jin	(Malaysia) National Football Academy (Singapore)	
	DC		(Malaysia) Muhammad Mohd Fauzi	(Malaysia) T-Team F.C. On Loan	
	MF		(Malaysia) Amirul Ikmal Hafiz	(Malaysia) Johor Darul Takzim II F.C. On Loan	
	AMC/ST		(Malaysia) Mohd Alif Haikal Mohd Sabri	(Malaysia) Selangor FA	
	DF		(Malaysia) Kannan a/l Kalaiselvan	(Malaysia) Selangor FA	
	ST		(Malaysia) Adam Shafiq Fua'ad	(Malaysia) Selangor FA	
	ST		(Malaysia) Sean Eugene Selvaraj	(Malaysia) Negeri Sembilan FA On Loan	
	DF		(Malaysia) Mohd Adib Zainuddin	(Malaysia) Johor Darul Takzim II F.C.	
	DL		(Malaysia) Muhd Syazwan Andik Mohd Ishak	(Malaysia) Johor Darul Takzim II F.C. On Loan	
	DR		(Malaysia) Shafiq Azreen Sa'ari	(Malaysia) SSTMI	
	DF		(Malaysia) Muhammad Amirul Hafizul Syamsul	(Malaysia) SSTMI	
	AMRL/ST		(Malaysia) Kumaahran a/l Sathasivam	(Malaysia) Penang FA	
	DF		(Malaysia) Johar Adli Joharudin	(Malaysia) Perak FA	

=== Transfers out ===
Exit date	Position	No.	Player	To club	Fee
	ST		(Malaysia) Ahmad Qushairi Mustafa	(Malaysia) Felda United F.C.	
	DF		(Malaysia) Gusti Ishak Fitri Shah Said	(Malaysia) Kuala Lumpur FA	
	MF		(Malaysia) Tunku Noor Hidayat Tunku Ishak	(Malaysia) Penang FA	
	MF		(Malaysia) Mohd Amirul Hisyam Awang Kechik	(Malaysia) Harimau Muda A	
	MF		(Malaysia) Muhd Azri Zulkiflee	(Malaysia) Kuala Lumpur FA	
	ST		(Malaysia) Azahari Radzali	(Malaysia) Perlis FA	
	MF		(Malaysia) Mohd Helmi Hariri Ibrahim	(Malaysia) Kuala Lumpur FA	
	MF		(Malaysia) Muhd Faizzwan Dorahim	(Malaysia) Perak FA	
	MF		(Malaysia) Muhd Farhan Hazmi Mohd Nasir	(Malaysia) Kuala Lumpur FA	
	D/ML		(Malaysia) Muhd Syazwan Zaipol Bahari	(Malaysia) Harimau Muda B	
	AMC		(Malaysia) Muhammad Irfan Zakaria	(Malaysia) Harimau Muda B	
	MC		(Malaysia) Muhd Azalinullah Mohd Alias	(Malaysia) T-Team F.C.	
	DC		(Malaysia) Mohd Arif Fadzilah Abu Bakar	(Malaysia) T-Team F.C.	
	GK		(Malaysia) Abdul Gafur Samsudin	(Malaysia) Selangor FA	
	DF		(Malaysia) Muhd Azrul Zulkifli	(Malaysia) Sungai Ara F.C.	
	DF		(Malaysia) Mohd Faris Shah Rosli	(Malaysia) Harimau Muda B	
	ST		(Malaysia) Ahmad Azriddin Rosli	(Malaysia) Felda United F.C.	
	AMR		(Malaysia) Muhd Shahrul Hakim Rahim	(Malaysia) Negeri Sembilan FA	
	AMC		(Malaysia) Muhd Syahrizal Shaharin	(Malaysia) Negeri Sembilan FA	
	MC		(Malaysia) Shakir Zufayri Ibrahim	(Malaysia) Terengganu FA	
	GK		(Malaysia) Muhd Nabil Akmal Rusman	(Malaysia) Johor Darul Takzim II F.C.	
	GK		(Malaysia) Amierul Hakimi Awang	(Malaysia) Terengganu FA	

== Sungai Ara ==
=== Transfers in ===
Entry date	Position	No.	Player	From club	Fee

== See also ==
- 2014 Malaysia Super League
- 2014 Malaysia Premier League
- 2014 Malaysia FAM League
- 2014 Malaysia FA Cup
- 2014 Malaysia Cup
