= List of Malaysian football transfers 2014 second transfer window =

This is a list of Malaysian football transfers for the 2014 second transfer window. Moves featuring Malaysia Super League, Malaysia Premier League and Malaysia FAM Cup club are listed.

2014 second transfer window opened on 23 March and closed on 22 April.

The first transfer window began once clubs had concluded their final domestic fixture of the 2014 season, but many transfers will only officially go through on 1 December onwards because the majority of player contracts finish on 31 October.

== 2014 Second Transfers ==
All clubs without a flag are Malaysian. Otherwise it will be stated.

=== Transfers ===
Date	Name	Moving from	Moving to	Fee (Note: Transfer fees are gathered from the various and may not be exact)
10 March 2014	(Australia) Ryan Griffiths	(Australia) Adelaide United	Sarawak	Undisclosed
24 March 2014	(Malaysia) Wan Zack Haikal	(Japan) FC Ryukyu	Kelantan	Undisclosed
1 April 2014	(Haiti) Fabrice Noël	(United States) San Antonio Scorpions	ATM	Free
1 April 2014	(Lebanon) Hassan Al Mohamed	(Lebanon) Nejmeh	Sarawak	Free
1 April 2014	(South Korea) Park Yong-ho	(South Korea) Busan IPark	ATM	Free
1 April 2014	(Saint Vincent and the Grenadines) Marlon James	ATM	Unattached	N/A
1 April 2014	(Brazil) Marcos António	(Germany) 1. FC Nürnberg	Johor Darul Ta'zim	Free
1 April 2014	(Argentina) Pereyra Díaz	(Argentina) Lanús	Johor Darul Ta'zim	Free
1 April 2014	(Ghana) Prince Tagoe	(Tunisia) Club Africain	Kelantan	Free
1 April 2014	(Malaysia) Brendan Gan	(Australia) Rockdale City Suns	Kelantan	Free
1 April 2014	(Malaysia) Fitri Omar	ATM	Kelantan	Free
1 April 2014	(Lebanon) Mohammed Ghaddar	Kelantan	Unattached	N/A
1 April 2014	(Brazil) Evaldo	(Brazil) Grêmio Esportivo Brasil	Selangor	Free
1 April 2014	(Brazil) Juninho	Selangor	(Thailand) TOT	Free
1 April 2014	(Senegal) Moustapha Dabo	(Turkey) Kahramanmaraşspor	Terengganu	Free
1 April 2014	(Colombia) Javier Estupiñán	(Honduras) Parrillas One	Terengganu	Free
1 April 2014	(Montenegro) Milan Purović	(Serbia) Bežanija	Perak	Free
1 April 2014	(Nigeria) Abdulafees Abdulsalam	(Qatar) Al-Shamal	Perak	Free
1 April 2014	(Lebanon) Hassan Daher	(Lebanon) Shabab Al-Sahel	Perak	Free
1 April 2014	(Rwanda) Jimmy Mulisa	(Belgium) A.F.C. Tubize	T–Team	Free
1 April 2014	(Brazil) Leandro Dos Santos	(Thailand) Bangkok Glass	T–Team	Free
1 April 2014	(Australia) Goran Šubara	(Thailand) Bangkok Glass	T–Team	Free
1 April 2014	(Malaysia) Nik Zul Aziz	Terengganu	T–Team	Free
1 April 2014	(Malaysia) Fazli Baharudin	PKNS	T–Team	Free
21 April 2014	(Argentina) Pablo Aimar	Johor Darul Ta'zim	Unattached	N/A
21 April 2014	(Malaysia) Nazmi Faiz	PKNS	Selangor	Free
23 April 2014	(Nigeria) Obinna Nwaneri	Kelantan	Unattached	N/A
1 May 2014	(Singapore) Baihakki Khaizan	Johor Darul Ta'zim	(Singapore) LionsXII	Free

=== Loans ===
Date	Name	Moving from	Moving to
1 April 2014	(Malaysia) Raimi Mohd Nor	Selangor	Felda United

=== Unattached Players ===
Date	Name	New Club
