= 2013 Malaysia FA Cup =

Piala FA

Tournament details
- Country: Malaysia; Singapore; Cambodia
- Teams: 30

Final positions
- Champions: Kelantan (2nd title)
- Runners-up: Johor Darul Ta'zim

Tournament statistics
- Matches played: 21
- Goals scored: 70 (3.33 per match)
- Top goal scorer(s): Effa Owona (6 goals)

Awards
- Best player: Mohd Badhri Mohd Radzi (Kelantan)

The 2013 Malaysia FA Cup, also known as the Astro Piala FA due to the competition's sponsorship by Astro Arena, was the 24th season of the Malaysia FA Cup, a knockout competition for Malaysia's state football association and clubs.

Kelantan defended the title after defeating Johor Darul Ta'zim 1–0 in the final.

The cup winner of the 2013 edition has qualified for the 2014 AFC Cup.

== Teams ==
* ATM	* (Negeri Sembilan) NS Betaria
* (Kuala Lumpur) Felda United	* Johor
* Johor Darul Takzim	* Kedah
* Kelantan (2012 Piala FA champion)	* Kuala Lumpur
* LionsXII (From Singapore)	* Malacca
* Negeri Sembilan	* Pahang
* (Penang) PBAPP	* Penang
* Perak	* Perlis
* (Malaysia) PDRM	* (Selangor) PKNS
* (Kuala Lumpur) Pos Malaysia	* Preah Khan Reach (Invited from Cambodia)
* Sabah	* Sarawak
* Selangor	* (Pahang) Shahzan Muda
* (Kuala Lumpur) Sime Darby (2012 Piala FA runners up)	* (Putrajaya) SPA
* Tentera Darat	* Terengganu
* (Terengganu) T-Team	* (Selangor) UiTM

== Format ==
30 teams will participate in this tournament instead of 32 in the 2012 edition. 2012 winners Kelantan and runners-up Sime Darby have received byes for this edition and will progress straight into the Round of 16.

Just like the previous edition, the first two rounds would be single matches. The quarter finals and semi finals would be played over two legs while the final will be played at National Stadium, Bukit Jalil, Kuala Lumpur, on 26 June.

== Matches ==
The draw for the Piala FA 2013 was held at Wisma FAM on 10 December 2012.

Cambodian club Preah Khan Reach is invited for the 2nd time. to participate in the Piala FA, after exiting in the Round of 16 in the 2012 edition.

The Singapore club LionsXII is also participating for the second time in this competition, after being knocked out in the first round by PKNS to a 1-0 aggregate loss.

=== Bracket ===
1st Round
(Selangor) PKNS	1
(Singapore) LionsXII	0
Sarawak	3
Malacca	0
(Cambodia) Preah Khan	1
(Penang) PBAPP	5
Kuala Lumpur	0
(Kuala Lumpur) Pos Malaysia	5
(Selangor) UiTM	0
Negeri Sembilan	2
(Malaysia) PDRM	1
Penang	2
(Putrajaya) SPA	1
Terengganu	3
Kedah	3
(Negeri Sembilan) NS Betaria	0
Johor Darul Takzim	1
Perak	0
Sabah	2
(Kuala Lumpur) FELDA United	1
Selangor	2(3)
ATM	2(2)
Johor	2
Pahang	3
(Pahang) Shahzan Muda	0
Tentera Darat	2
(Terengganu) T-Team	3
Perlis	2

2nd Round
Kelantan	4
(Selangor) PKNS	2
Sarawak	2
(Penang) PBAPP	0
(Kuala Lumpur) Pos Malaysia	0
Negeri Sembilan	2
Penang	0
Terengganu	3
Kedah	2(4)
Johor Darul Takzim	2(5)
Sabah	0
Selangor	3
Pahang	7
Tentera Darat	1
(Terengganu) T-Team	0
(Kuala Lumpur) Sime Darby	1

Quarter-finals
Kelantan	2	2	4
Sarawak	1	0	1
Negeri Sembilan	1	0	1
Terengganu	3	3	6
Johor Darul Takzim	1	2	3(4)
Selangor	2	1	3(2)
Pahang	0	2	2
(Kuala Lumpur) Sime Darby	0	0	0

Semi-finals
Kelantan	4	2	6
Terengganu	1	4	5
Johor Darul Takzim (a)	1	1	2
Pahang	0	2	2

Final
Kelantan	1
Johor Darul Takzim	0

=== Round of 32 ===
The first round will commence on 25 January 2013.

25 January	Johor	2–3	Pahang	Pasir Gudang Corporation Stadium, Pasir Gudang, Johor
16:15 UTC+08:00	Muriel Orlando 11', 51'		Mohamed Borji 14'; Fauzi Roslan 45+' (pen.), 75'	Referee: Samsudin Ibrahim (Terengganu)

Friday 25 January	PBAPP (Penang)	5–1	(Cambodia) Preah Khan Reach	Penang City Stadium, George Town, Pulau Pinang
16:15 UTC+08:00

Friday 25 January	Kuala Lumpur	0–5	(Kuala Lumpur) Pos Malaysia	KLFA Stadium, Cheras, Kuala Lumpur
16:15 UTC+08:00			Saufi Ibrahim 26'; S. Sumindran 38', 60'; Hasnan Mat Isa 73'; Razif Rahim 78'

Friday 25 January	PDRM (Malaysia)	1–2	Penang	Hang Jebat Stadium, Melaka
16:15 UTC+08:00	Edrisar Kaye 7'		Syafuan Riduwan 53', 90'

Friday 25 January	SPA (Putrajaya)	1–3	Terengganu	Selayang Stadium, Selayang, Kuala Lumpur
16:15 UTC+08:00	Islam Raja Ali 90' (pen.)		Ismail Faruqi 16'; Effa Owona 69', 86'

Friday 25 January	Shahzan Muda (Pahang)	0–2	Tentera Darat	Temerloh Mini Stadium, Temerloh, Pahang
16:15 UTC+08:00			67', 71'

Friday 25 January	T-Team (Terengganu)	3–2 (a.e.t.)	Perlis	Sultan Ismail Nasiruddin Shah Stadium, Kuala Terengganu, Terengganu
16:15 UTC+08:00	Fazuan Abdullah 32'; Latiff Suhaimi 33', 107'		Hadi Syahmi 38'; Nurfirdaus Roswanan 51'	Attendance: 5,000; Referee: Les Mostia Mohen Mohd Tisan (Negeri Sembilan)

Friday 25 January	Sabah	2–1	(Kuala Lumpur) Felda United	Likas Stadium, Kota Kinabalu, Sabah
16:15 UTC+08:00	Koh Traore 16'; Jufferey Ommopor 73'		Mohammed Ghaddar 67'

Friday 25 January	Sarawak	3–0	Malacca	Sarawak Stadium, Kuching, Sarawak
20:15 UTC+08:00	Shahrol Saperi 66'; Bobby Gonzales 80', 88'

Friday 25 January	Kedah	3–0	(Negeri Sembilan) NS Betari	Darul Aman Stadium, Alor Setar, Kedah
20:45 UTC+08:00	Mohd Khyril Muhymeen Zambri 42'; Chayene Santos 49' (pen.); Akmal Rizal Ahmad Rakhli 79'

Friday 25 January	Johor Darul Takzim	1–0	Perak	Tan Sri Dato Hj Hassan Yunos Stadium, Johor Bahru, Johor
20:45 UTC+08:00	Aidil Zafuan 59'			Referee: Nagor Amir Noor Mohamed

Friday 25 January	Selangor	2–2 (a.e.t.) (3–2 p)	ATM	Shah Alam Stadium, Shah Alam, Selangor
20:45 UTC+08:00	Afiq Azmi 55' 58'		Marlon 8'; Affize Faisal 26'	Referee: Amirul izwan Yaakob (Perak)
	Penalties
	Mahali (penalty scored); Asraruddin (penalty scored); Raimi (penalty missed); S. Veenod (penalty scored)		Marlon (penalty scored); Reuben (penalty missed); Affize (penalty missed); Bruno (penalty missed)

Saturday 26 January	PKNS (Selangor)	1–0	(Singapore) LionsXII	Petaling Jaya Stadium, Petaling Jaya, Selangor
16:15 UTC+08:00	Fauzan Dzulkifli 18'

Saturday 26 January	UiTM (Selangor)	0–2	Negeri Sembilan	UiTM Stadium, Shah Alam Selangor
16:15 UTC+08:00			De Porras 8', 43'

=== Round of 16 ===
The second round will commence on 26 February 2013.

Tuesday 12 February	Sabah	0–3	Selangor	Likas Stadium, Kota Kinabalu, Sabah
15:45 UTC+08:00		Report	Forkey Doe 44', 87'; Raimi Mohd Nor 51'

Tuesday 26 February	T-Team (Terengganu)	0–1	(Malaysia) Sime Darby	Sultan Ismail Nasiruddin Shah Stadium, Kuala Terengganu, Terengganu
16:15 UTC+08:00			Marzuki Yusof 66' (o.g.)

Tuesday 26 February	Pos Malaysia (Kuala Lumpur)	0–2	Negeri Sembilan	Majlis Perbandaran Selayang Stadium, Selayang, Kuala Lumpur
16:15 UTC+08:00			Fauzi Nan 25'; Rashid Mahmud 43'

Tuesday 26 February	Penang	0–3	Terengganu	Penang City Stadium, George Town, Pulau Pinang
16:15 UTC+08:00			Ashaari Shamsuddin 2', 59'; Khairul Ramadhan 75'

Tuesday 26 February	Kedah	2–2 (a.e.t.) (4–5 p)	Johor Darul Takzim	Darul Aman Stadium, Alor Setar, Kedah
20:45 UTC+08:00	Khyril Muhymeen 8', 19'		Daniel Guiza 62', 90+1'	Referee: Syed Azhar Syed kamar (Kuala Lumpur)
	Penalties
	Nelson (penalty scored); Khyril (penalty scored); Shahrul (penalty scored); Baddrol (penalty scored); Shazuan (penalty missed)		Del Nero (penalty scored); Norshahrul (penalty scored); Afiq (penalty scored); Azinee (penalty scored); Guiza (penalty scored)

Tuesday 26 February	Pahang	7–1	Tentera Darat	Darulmakmur Stadium, Kuantan, Pahang
20:45 UTC+08:00	R.Gopinathan 16'; Azamuddin Akil 25', 27', 51' (pen.), 70'; Faizol Hussien 38'; Mohamed Borji 88'		Faizul 67'	Referee: Ramli Md Dahan (terengganu)

Tuesday 26 February	Sarawak	2–0	(Penang) PBAPP	Sarawak Stadium, Kuching, Sarawak
20:45 UTC+08:00	Azizan Baba 32'; Bobby Gonzales 57'

Monday 25 Mac	Kelantan	4–2	(Selangor) PKNS	Sultan Muhammad IV Stadium, Kota Bharu, Kelantan
20:45 UTC+08:00	Faiz Subri 4'; Badhri Radzi 7'; Obinna Nwaneri 22' (pen.); Helmi Remeli 31' (o.g.)		Nizad Ayub 25'; Helmi Loussaief 51' (pen.)	Attendance: 20,000

=== Quarter-finals ===
The first leg matches will be played on 6 April 2013, with the second legs to be held on 16 April 2013.

Team 1	Agg.	Team 2	1st leg	2nd leg
Kelantan	4 – 1	Sarawak	2 – 1	2 – 0
Negeri Sembilan	1 – 6	Terengganu	1 – 3	0 – 3
Johor Darul Takzim	3 (4) – (2) 3	Selangor	1 – 2	2 – 1
Pahang	2 – 0	(Kuala Lumpur) Sime Darby	0 – 0	2 – 0

==== First leg ====
Saturday 6 April	Kelantan	2–1	Sarawak	Sultan Muhammad IV Stadium, Kota Bharu, Kelantan
20:45 UTC+08:00	Faiz Subri 7'; Khairul Izuan Rosli 20'	Report	Joseph Kalang 48'	Attendance: 14,000; Referee: Mohd Zamzaidi Katimin

Saturday 6 April	Negeri Sembilan	1–3	Terengganu	Tuanku Abdul Rahman Stadium, Seremban, Negeri Sembilan
20:45 UTC+08:00	Nazrin Nawi 73'	Report	Effa Owona 77'; Ashaari Shamsuddin 90+1'; Nordin Alias 90+3'	Attendance: 3,000; Referee: Syed Azhar Syed Kamar

Saturday 6 April	Johor Darul Takzim	1–2	Selangor	Tan Sri Dato Hj Hassan Yunos Stadium, Johor Bahru, Johor
20:45 UTC+08:00	Safee Sali 82' (pen.)	Report	Mahali Jasuli 14'; Amri Yahyah 68'	Attendance: 30,000; Referee: Samsudin Ibrahim (Terengganu)

Saturday 6 April	Pahang	0–0	(Kuala Lumpur) Sime Darby	Darulmakmur Stadium, Kuantan, Pahang
20:45 UTC+08:00				Attendance: 10,000; Referee: Wan Mohamad Tarmizi Wan Ibrahim (Selangor)

==== Second leg ====
Tuesday 16 April	Terengganu	3–0	Negeri Sembilan	Sultan Ismail Nasiruddin Shah Stadium, Kuala Terengganu, Terengganu
16:15 UTC+08:00	Ashaari Shamsuddin 25'; Effa Owona 54', 71' (pen.)	Report		Attendance: 4,500; Referee: Suhaizi Shukri (Melaka)

Tuesday 16 April	Sime Darby (Kuala Lumpur)	0–2	Pahang	Majlis Perbandaran Selayang Stadium, Selayang, Kuala Lumpur
16:15 UTC+08:00		Report	Matías Conti 76', 80'	Attendance: 1,500; Referee: Mohd Amirul Izwan Yaacob (Perak)

Tuesday 16 April	Sarawak	0–2	Kelantan	Sarawak Stadium, Kuching, Sarawak
20:15 UTC+08:00		Report	Indra Putra 19'; Nor Farhan 31'	Attendance: 15,000; Referee: Nagor Amir Noor Mohamed

Tuesday 16 April	Selangor	1–2 (a.e.t.) (2–4 p)	Johor Darul Takzim	Shah Alam Stadium, Shah Alam, Selangor
20:45 UTC+08:00	Mahali Jasuli 28'	Report	Leonel Núñez 66', 87'	Attendance: 25,000; Referee: Les Mostia Mohen Mohd Tisan (Negeri Sembilan)
	Penalties
	Asraruddin (penalty scored); Mahali (penalty missed); Gurusamy (penalty missed); Amri (penalty scored)		Núñez (penalty scored); Safee (penalty scored); Andrezinho (penalty scored); Farid (penalty scored)

=== Semi-finals ===
The first leg matches will be played on 25 May 2013, with the second legs to be held on 28 May 2013.

(a)

Team 1	Agg.	Team 2	1st leg	2nd leg
Kelantan	6 – 5	Terengganu	4 – 1	2 – 4
Pahang	2 – 2 (a)	Johor Darul Takzim	0 – 1	2 - 1

==== First leg ====
Saturday 25 May
20:45 UTC+08:00

Kelantan	4–1	Terengganu
Nwakaeme 79'; Indra Putra 88'; Nwaneri 90+2' (pen.); Zairo Anuar 90+3'	Report	Ashaari Shamsuddin 2'

Sultan Muhammad IV Stadium, Kota Bharu, Kelantan
Attendance: 20,000
Referee: Nagor Amir Noor Mohamed
Saturday 25 May
20:45 UTC+08:00

Johor Darul Takzim	1–0	Pahang
Leonel Núñez 22'	Report

Tan Sri Dato Hj Hassan Yunos Stadium, Johor Bahru, Johor
Attendance: 30,000
Referee: Zamzaidi Katimin (Melaka)

==== Second leg ====
Tuesday 28 May
16:15 UTC+08:00

Terengganu	4–2 (a.e.t.)	Kelantan
Vincent Bikana 5'; G. Puaneswaran 27'; Effa Owona 71'; Manaf Mamat 90+2'	Report	Nwaneri 90+5'; Nwakaeme 129'

Sultan Ismail Nasiruddin Shah Stadium, Kuala Terengganu, Terengganu
Attendance: 8,500
Referee: Suhaizi Shukri (Melaka)
Saturday 1 June
20:45 UTC+08:00

Pahang	2–1	Johor Darul Takzim
Matías Conti 2', 40'	Report	Andrezinho 48'

National Stadium, Bukit Jalil, Kuala Lumpur
Referee: Syed Azhar Syed Kamar (Kuala Lumpur)

== Final ==
Saturday, 29 June
20:45 UTC+08:00

Kelantan	1–0	Johor Darul Takzim
Nor Farhan 15'	Report

National Stadium, Bukit Jalil, Kuala Lumpur
Attendance: 90,000
Referee: Syed Azhar Syed Kamar (Kuala Lumpur)

== Winners ==
2013 Piala FA Winner

Kelantan
2nd Title

== Season statistics ==
=== Top scorers ===
Rank	Player	Club	Goals
1	(Cameroon) Jean-Emmanuel Effa Owona	Terengganu	6
2	(Malaysia) Mohd Ashaari Shamsuddin	Terengganu	5
3	(Malaysia) Mohd Azamuddin Md Akil	Pahang	4
3	(Argentina) Matías Conti	Pahang	4
4	(Argentina) Leonel Núñez	Johor Darul Takzim	3
4	(Malaysia) Mohd Khyril Muhymeen Zambri	Kedah	3
4	(Nigeria) Obinna Nwaneri	Kelantan	3
4	(Malaysia) Bobby Gonzales	Sarawak	3
8	(Brazil) Andrezinho	Johor Darul Takzim	2
8	(Spain) Daniel Guiza	Johor Darul Takzim	2
8	(Argentina) Muriel Orlando	Johor	2
8	(Nigeria) Dickson Nwakaeme	Kelantan	2
8	(Malaysia) Indra Putra Mahayuddin	Kelantan	2
8	(Malaysia) Mohd Faiz Subri	Kelantan	2
8	(Malaysia) Mohd Nor Farhan Muhammad	Kelantan	2
8	(Argentina) Emanuel De Porras	Negeri Sembilan	2
8	(Morocco) Mohamed Borji	Pahang	2
8	(Malaysia) Mohd Fauzi Roslan	Pahang	2
8	(Malaysia) Mohd Syafuan Riduwan	Penang	2
8	(Malaysia) S. Sumindran	(Malaysia) Pos Malaysis	2
8	(Malaysia) Afiq Azmi	Selangor	2
8	(Liberia) Francis Forkey Doe	Selangor	2
8	(Malaysia) Mahali Jasuli	Selangor	2
8	(Malaysia) Abdul Latiff Suhaimi	(Terengganu) T-Team	2
23	(Malaysia) Mohd Aidil Zafuan Abdul Radzak	Johor Darul Takzim	1
23	(Malaysia) Mohd Safee Mohd Sali	Johor Darul Takzim	1
23	(Lebanon) Mohammed Ghaddar	(Kuala Lumpur) FELDA United	1
23	(Malaysia) Akmal Rizal Ahmad Rakhli	Kedah	1
23	(Brazil) Chayene Santos	Kedah	1
23	(Malaysia) Mohd Khairul Izuan Rosli	Kelantan	1
23	(Malaysia) Mohd Badhri Mohd Radzi	Kelantan	1
23	(Malaysia) Zairo Anuar Zalani	Kelantan	1
23	(Malaysia) Mohd Fauzi Nan	Negeri Sembilan	1
23	(Malaysia) Mohd Nazrin Mohd Nawi	Negeri Sembilan	1
23	(Malaysia) Rashid Mahmud	Negeri Sembilan	1
23	(Malaysia) R.Gopinathan	Pahang	1
23	(Malaysia) Mohd Faizol Hussien	Pahang	1
23	(Malaysia) Edrisar Kaye	(Malaysia) PDRM	1
23	(Malaysia) Mohd Islam Raja Ali	Penang	1
23	(Malaysia) Hadi Syahmi Hamzah	Perlis	1
23	(Malaysia) Mohd Nurfirdaus Roswanan	Perlis	1
23	(France) Helmi Loussaief	(Selangor) PKNS	1
23	(Malaysia) Mohd Fauzan Dzulkifli	(Selangor) PKNS	1
23	(Malaysia) Mohd Nizad Ayub	(Selangor) PKNS	1
23	(Malaysia) Hasnan Mat Isa	Pos Malaysia	1
23	(Malaysia) Razif Rahim	Pos Malaysia	1
23	(Malaysia) Saufi Ibrahim	Pos Malaysia FC	1
23	(Malaysia) Jufferey Ommopor	Sabah	1
23	(Ivory Coast) Koh Traore	Sabah	1
23	(Malaysia) Joseph Kalang Tie	Sarawak	1
23	(Malaysia) Mohd Azizan Baba	Sarawak	1
23	(Malaysia) Mohd Shahrol Saperi	Sarawak	1
23	(Malaysia) Mohd Amri Yahyah	Selangor	1
23	(Malaysia) Mohd Raimi Mohd Nor	Selangor	1
23	(Malaysia) Abdul Manaf Mamat	Terengganu	1
23	(Malaysia) Ahmad Nordin Alias	Terengganu	1
23	(Malaysia) G. Puaneswaran	Terengganu	1
23	(Malaysia) Ismail Faruqi Asha'ri	Terengganu	1
23	(Malaysia) Khairul Ramadhan Zauwawi	Terengganu	1
23	(Cameroon) Vincent Bikana	Terengganu	1
23	(Malaysia) Fazuan Abdullah	(Terengganu) T-Team	1

As of 29 June 2013

== See also ==
- 2013 Malaysia Super League
- 2013 Malaysia Premier League
- 2013 Malaysia FAM League
- Piala FA
