= No call, no show =

American term for workplace absence

A no call, no show is an American term for absence from the workforce without notifying the employer.

== Summary ==
When workers miss work, (especially in jobs in which one's workload would require to be substituted for the day, such as teachers, cashiers, servers, etc.), it is generally expected by employers that workers call in advance to inform of their absence so that their position can be substituted by other workers. Many businesses have forms of disciplinary actions as a result of no call, no shows, such as counseling statements, suspension, and possibly dismissal.

== Occurrences ==
When a no call, no show is not preventable, such as when an employee suffers a medical emergency and is unable to inform their employer, satisfactory documentation of the situation is expected. In the United States, the Family and Medical Leave Act of 1993 (FMLA) allows employees to take unpaid leave during specifics situations such as medical issues, but they still must comply with attendance policy.

No call, no show is common in the temporary employment industry. Agencies often hire 10% to 20% more employees than required to compensate for its occurrence.

== See also ==
- AWOL (absent without official leave), a military term
