= PF =

PF may refer to:

== Arts and entertainment ==
- Pianoforte, full original name of the piano instrument
- Phineas Flynn, a fictional character
- Project Fanboy, a comic book news website
- Peregrine Falcons Squad, a faction in the Metal Slug series of video games

== Businesses ==
- PF Flyers, a brand of shoes
- Palestinian Airlines (IATA code PF 1995-2020), a Palestinian airline that operated from Egypt
- Primera Air (IATA code PF 2009-2018), a Danish airline
- Pell Frischmann, a multi-disciplinary engineering consultancy

== Economics and finance ==
- Pfennig, a unit of currency formerly used in Germany, symbol ₰
- Provident Fund (disambiguation), name of various pension funds

== Language ==
- Phonetic form, a level of syntactic representation in linguistics
- Voiceless labiodental affricate (⟨p̪͡f⟩, ⟨p̪͜f⟩, or ⟨p̪f⟩), a type of consonant sound
- Pf (digraph), a German digraph

== Organizations ==
- Pheasants Forever, a non-profit habitat conservation organization
- Federal Police (Polícia Federal), in Brazil
- Patients' Front, a late 1960s to early 1970s West German pro-illness movement
- South Vietnamese Popular Force, a local defense militia formed by South Vietnam during the Vietnam War
- Patriotic Front (disambiguation), name of a political party in several countries

== Places ==
- Paracel Islands, FIPS PUB 10-4 territory code
- French Polynesia (Polynésie française), by ISO 3166 code
  - .pf, internet country code for French Polynesia
- Pforzheim and Enzkreis district, Germany (vehicle plate code PF)

== Science and technology ==
=== Computing ===
- .pf, internet country code for French Polynesia
- PF (firewall), OpenBSD's stateful packet filter
- PF keys, a type of function keys on old keyboards
- Page fault, a type of exception (error) in computer programming
- Page file, a file used as an extension for computer memory

=== Physics ===
- Power factor, or cos phi, of an AC electric power system
- Purple fringing, a type of chromatic aberration in photography
- Phenol formaldehyde resin, the earliest synthetic polymer
- Picofarad (pF) or petafarad (PF), multiples of farad, the SI unit of electric capacitance
- Photon Factory, a synchrotron located at KEK in Tsukuba, Japan

=== In other sciences and mathematics ===
- pf(A), the Pfaffian of a matrix A
- Phenylphosphine, an organophosphorus compound
- Plasmodium falciparum, a species of Plasmodium that causes malaria in humans
- Polar front, in meteorology
- Position fix, a position derived from measuring external reference points
- Psychometric function, an inferential psychometric model
- Horowitz index (PF), blood oxygenation

== Sports ==
- Personal foul (disambiguation), a type of foul in several sports
- Power forward (disambiguation), a type of position in several sports

== Other uses ==
- A US Navy hull classification symbol: Patrol frigate (PF)
- Pilot flying, in commercial aviation, a designation for the pilot in control of an aircraft
- New Year cards with PF / P.F. or pour féliciter, as New Year wishes, since 19th century in Bohemia
- Procurator fiscal, the public prosecutor in Scotland
- Public forum debate, a debate sanctioned by the National Speech and Debate Association
- Pekoe Fannings, a grade of tea leaves

== See also ==
- PF1 (disambiguation)
