= P&F =

P&F may refer to:

- Phineas and Ferb, an American animated television series
- P&F chart, a technique in financial analysis
- Pioneer and Fayette Railroad, a historic railroad in Ohio, United States
- P&F Corbin, a 19th-century company in Connecticut, United States
- Progress and Freedom, a Georgian political party

== See also ==
- Pepperl+Fuchs, a German multinational company
- PF (disambiguation)
