= Counseling statements in the United States =

A counseling statement is a form of verbal or written counseling given to employees in the workforce who have violated a company policy. Counseling statements, the least severe form of disciplinary action, serve as warnings for violations. Counseling statements generally include the exact violation and show how one can prevent committing that violation in the future, and they improve employee performance. Too many counseling statements in a job can eventually result in a suspension or termination of employment.

Common reasons for counseling statements in the workforce are not finishing one's assignments/tasks, unexcused absences or tardies, loss of money (such as cashiers), insubordination. Different jobs have different ways of writing, and announcing counseling statements.
