= PF1 =

PF1, PF-1, PF01, PF-01, or variant, may refer to:

- PSA PF1 platform, the "PF1" platform from PSA
- pf1, a bacteriophage code, see List of MeSH codes (B04)
- Pf1, a Pseudomonas phage, see List of viruses
- Posnansky/Fronius PF-1 White Knight, model PF-1 glider "White Knight" from Posnansky/Fronius
- USS Asheville (PF-1), "PF-1" ship number USN patrol frigate USS Asheville
- HTMS Tachin (PF-1), "PF-1" ship number Thai patrol frigate HTMS Tachin
- Shenyang PF-1, model PF-1 jet engine from Shenyang
- MANOI PF01, model PF01 in the MANOI series of robots
- PF01 (Powered Flight 01), a test flight in the test program for SpaceShipTwo
- Pf-01, a composition by composer Carlos Sandoval
- PF-01, a grade used in coin grading
- PF1 (drug), also known as PF-06655075 or ASK1476, a long-acting peripheral peptide oxytocin receptor agonist

== See also ==
- PF (disambiguation)
