= Suspension (punishment) =

Time away from something as punishment or to allow for an investigation

Suspension refers to a temporary removal or exclusion from a position or activity, which can include the workplace, school, public office, clergy, or sports. It may be either paid or unpaid and is typically imposed to allow for an investigation or as a disciplinary measure for infractions of rules or policies.

== Workplace ==
Suspension is a common practice in the workplace for being in violation of an organization's policy, or major breaches of policy. Work suspensions occur when a business manager or supervisor deems an action of an employee, whether intentional or unintentional, to be a violation of policy that should result in a course of punishment, and when the employee's absence during the suspension period does not affect the company. This form of action hurts the employee because they will have no hours of work during the suspended period and therefore will not get paid, unless the suspension is with pay, or is challenged and subsequently overturned. Some jobs, which pay on salary, may have paid suspensions, in which the affected worker will be prevented from coming to work but will still receive pay. Generally, suspensions are deemed most effective if the affected worker remains unpaid. Suspensions are usually given after other means of counseling statements have been exhausted, but some violations may result in immediate suspension. Suspensions are tracked, and any number of them, even one, may prevent one from receiving raises, bonuses or promotions, or could cause dismissal from the company.

Suspension clauses are common components of collective bargaining agreements. Suspensions may be challenged by employees in unionized organizations through the filing of a grievance.

Suspension on full pay can also be used when an employee needs to be removed from the workplace to avoid prejudicing an investigation. This is used not as a punishment, but in the employer's best interest. For example, a police officer who shoots a person while on duty will be given a suspension with pay during the investigation, not to punish, but to enable the department to carry out its investigation.

== School discipline ==
In schools, suspension (also known as temporary exclusion) is a form of school punishment in which a student is excluded from school lessons for a period of time. Suspension is one form of exclusionary discipline; the other form is expulsion. A student's parents, and sometimes social workers if the student is in special education, are notified about the reason for the out-of-school suspension, such as the student being involved in a physical or verbal altercation, directing foul language at a school staff member, or throwing a temper tantrum on campus, and the length of the out-of-school suspension, which is typically between 3-5 days. Sometimes schools will have a meeting involving the student's parents, social worker if the student is in special education, and the student following an out-of-school suspension to discuss and evaluate the matter. Sometimes suspended students are required to complete assignments during their suspensions for which they receive no credit for some of the time, but are expected to do regardless. This could include a written essay stating that they will not engage in the behavior that led to their out-of-school suspension, which they could be required to hand in to a school administrator after returning to school from their suspension, or a journal detailing the reason why they were suspended, which they would have to hand in to a school administrator just like the aforementioned written essay.

Research shows that suspensions predict a range of negative social outcomes, including crime, involvement in the criminal justice system, juvenile delinquency, and drug use, as well as school absenteeism, dropout rates, and weaker performance on standardized tests. A 2014 study of students in the Australian state of Victoria and the U.S. state of Washington found that suspension rates were similar in both states and that both student-level factors and school-level factors were associated with suspension. Student-level factors included "student behavior, rebelliousness, and academic failure" and the school-level factors included "socioeconomic status of the school" and low aggregate school commitment. About one-third of students in the United States are suspended at some point during grades K-12.

In-school suspension (ISS), also called by other names, is a form of suspension that, in contrast to out-of-school suspension (OSS), keeps students out of class but places them in an alternate location away from other students within a school environment. In-school suspension is typically administered when lesser punishments, such as lunch detention, are not viable but larger punishments like out-of-school suspension or expulsion are also not viable.

== Public office ==
In the Philippines, an elected public official may be temporarily suspended from holding office to allow for an investigation to take place and prevent them to use their power to influence the course of the investigation.

== Sport ==
Suspension is a punishment in sport where players are banned from playing a certain number of future games. These suspensions may be issued for severe infractions of the rules of play (such as personal fouls), excessive technical, or flagrant fouls for the duration of a season, fights during the course of the game in which the player was a part of the wrongdoing, or misconduct off the field (such as illegal or banned substance use).

There has been many notable suspensions in sport history.

== In Roman Catholic canon law ==
In Roman Catholic canon law, the censure of suspension prohibits certain acts by a cleric, whether the acts are of a religious character deriving from his ordination ("acts of the power of orders") or are exercises of his power of governance or of rights and functions attached to the office he holds.

This censure is automatically applied to a cleric who uses physical violence against a bishop, a deacon who attempts to celebrate the sacrifice of the Mass or a priest who, though not empowered to grant sacramental absolution attempts to do so or who hears sacramental confession, a cleric who celebrates a sacrament through simony, and on a person who receives ordination illicitly.

The censure of suspension (along with other punishments) is to be inflicted also on a cleric who openly lives in violation of chastity and on any priest who "in the act, on the occasion, or under the pretext of confession" solicits a penitent to a sexual sin. Suspension is incurred automatically by any cleric who falsely denounces a priest of having committed this delict.

== See also ==
- Rustication (academia)
- Block (Internet)
- Administrative leave
