= Patriotic Front =

Patriotic Front may refer to:

- Patriotic Front (Austria)
- Patriotic Front (Bulgaria)
- Patriotic Front (Republic of the Congo)
- Patriotic Front (Cyprus)
- Patriotic Front (Trinidad and Tobago)
- Patriotic Front (Zambia)
- Patriotic Front (Zimbabwe)
- Zimbabwe African National Union - Patriotic Front
- Patriotic Front for Political Action (UK)
- Rwandese Patriotic Front
- Manuel Rodríguez Patriotic Front, a Marxist-Leninist paramilitary organization in Chile

== See also ==
- Patriot Front
- Patriot Front (Argentina)
