= Sultan Ismail Nasiruddin Shah Stadium =

Stadium in Kuala Terengganu, Terengganu, Malaysia

Sultan Ismail Nasiruddin Shah Stadium Stadium Sultan Ismail Nasiruddin Shah
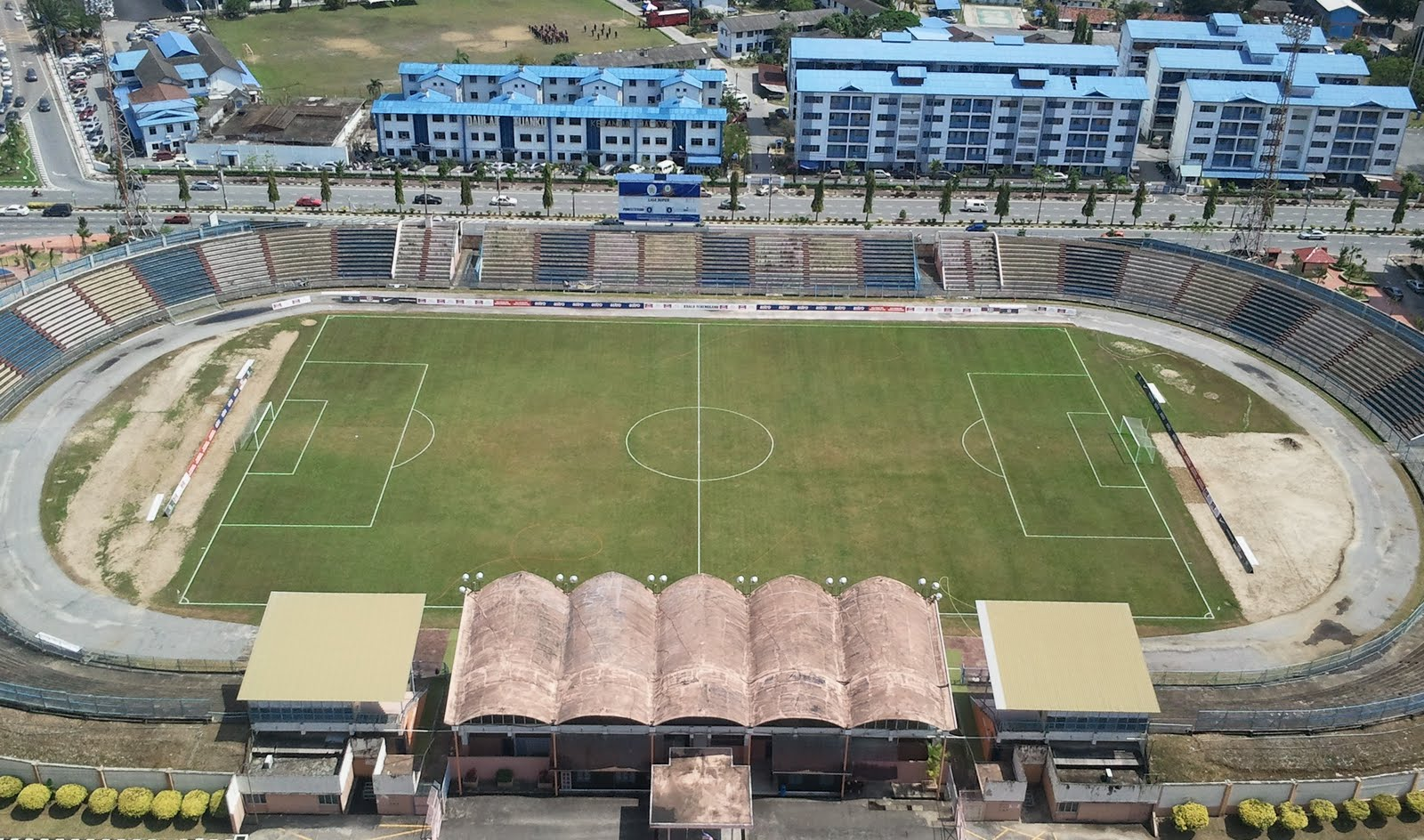
- Interactive map of Sultan Ismail Nasiruddin Shah Stadium; Stadium Sultan Ismail Nasiruddin Shah
- Full name: Sultan Ismail Nasiruddin Shah Stadium
- Location: Kuala Terengganu, Terengganu, Malaysia
- Coordinates: 5°22′22″N 103°6′23″E
- Owner: MBKT
- Capacity: 15,000
- Surface: Cowgrass
- Scoreboard: Yes
- Field size: 119 x 100 metres

Construction
- Opened: 27 August 1967

Tenants
- Terengganu FA (1967–2007, 2009–2017); Terengganu FC (2017–2019); T-Team (2006–2017); Terengganu City F.C. (2016–2018); Terengganu FC II (2017–present)

The Sultan Ismail Nasiruddin Shah Stadium (Malay: Stadium Sultan Ismail Nasiruddin Shah) is a multi-purpose stadium in Kuala Terengganu, Terengganu, Malaysia. The stadium is named after the fourth Sultan of Terengganu. The stadium has the capacity to accommodate 15,000 spectators. It is used mainly for football matches and serves as the home ground of Terengganu FC II, a feeder team of Terengganu FC.

== History ==
Sultan Ismail Nasiruddin Shah Stadium was officially opened by the Yang Maha Mulia Pemangku Raja Terengganu, Tengku Mahmud Ibni Sultan Ismail Nasaruddin Shah on 27 August 1967.

In 2008, after the completion of Sultan Mizan Zainal Abidin Stadium, it was going to be demolished by the Kuala Terengganu City Council (Malay: Majlis Bandaraya Kuala Terengganu) (MBKT) to make way for a new development project of a recreational hub and multi-storey car park dubbed as “Dataran Kuala Terengganu”. However, on 2 June 2009, the stadium demolition process was halted after the roof collapsed. The upper sections had been taken down and the football pitch was in a bad state. Due to the urgent state of affairs, the stadium was quickly fixed and restored to meet the requirements with reduced capacity of 15,000. In May 2015, the Sultan Mizan Zainal Abidin Stadium was given the green light by the FAM to hold competitive matches again. Terengganu FC II returned to the stadium.

== Overview ==
The stadium was built in the city of Kuala Terengganu, Terengganu, Malaysia.

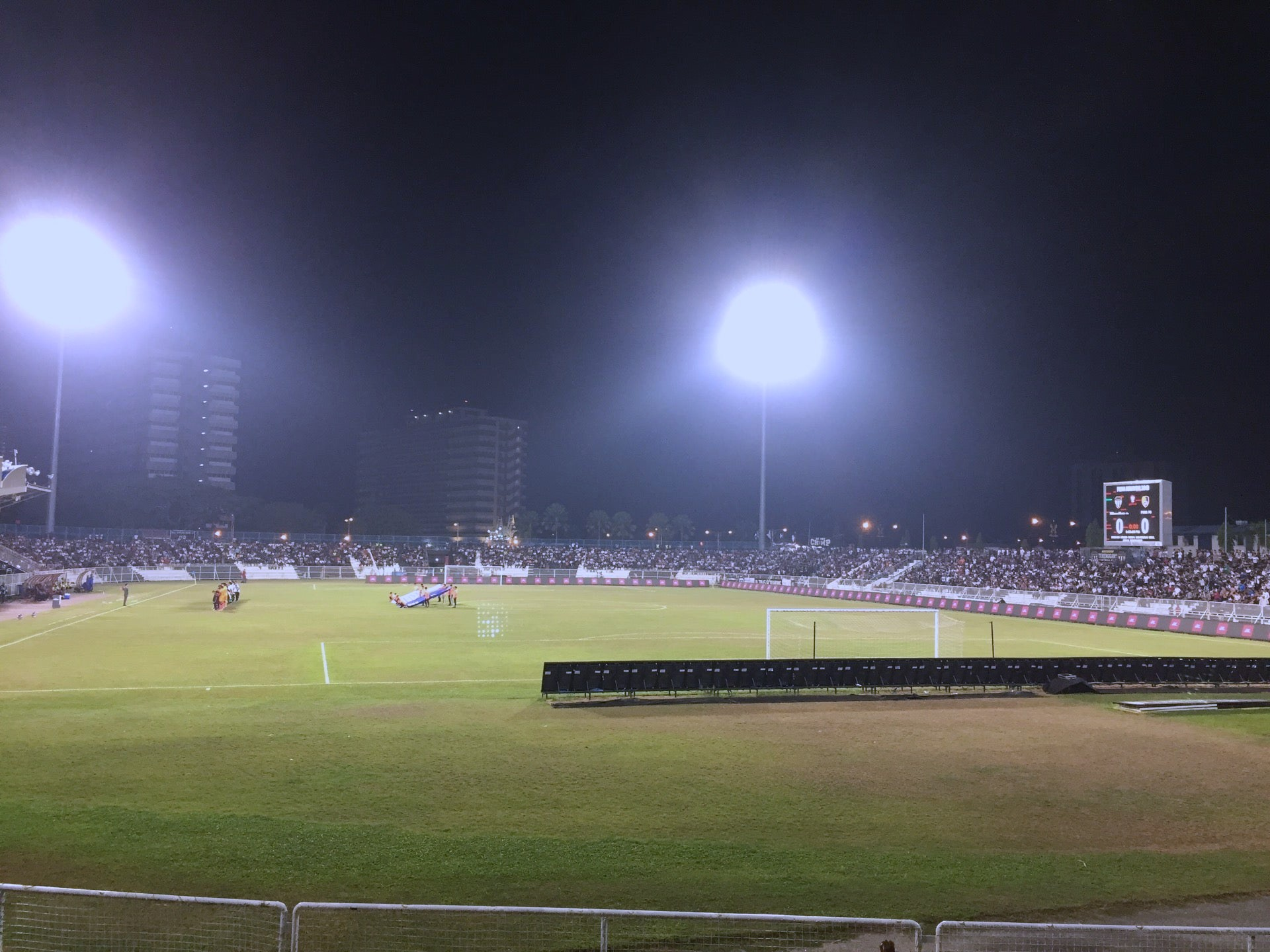
Sultan Ismail Nasiruddin Shah Stadium at night.

== See also ==
- Terengganu FC
- 2013 Terengganu FA season
