= Obinna Nwaneri =

Nigerian footballer (born 1982)

Personal information
- Date of birth: 19 March 1982 (age 44)
- Place of birth: Lagos, Nigeria
- Height: 1.83 m (6 ft 0 in)
- Positions: Centre-back; right-back

Youth career
- Julius Berger

Senior career*
Years	Team	Apps	(Gls)
2000–2002	Julius Berger	6	(1)
2003–2004	Enyimba		
2004–2007	Espérance	43	(3)
2007–2010	FC Sion	71	(2)
2010–2011	Kazma		
2012–2014	Kelantan	50	(3)
2015	ATM		
2016	Perlis		

International career^{‡}
2005–2010	Nigeria	34	(1)
- * Club domestic league appearances and goals as of 6 January 2016 ‡ National team caps and goals as of 6 January 2016

Obinna Nwaneri (born 19 March 1982) is a Nigerian former professional footballer who played as centre-back or right-back position but could also play as a forward.

His name, Obinna, means "Father's heart" in Igbo. He is described as mobile central defender with pace, control and timing. A natural leader, which had earned him the captain armband in Enyimba and FC Sion respectively.

Nwaneri started his career with Nigerian side Julius Berger then with African Champions Enyimba, where he won the CAF Champions League and then signed with Swiss club FC Sion during the 2007 January transfer window, a club he later captained before leaving the following summer.

== Career ==
- 2000: Broke into a talented Julius Berger side that had an amazing turnaround season, going from barely escaping relegation the season before, to annexing the Nigerian Pepsi League crown.
- 2001: Had a standout season with the 'Bridge Boys', proving to be one of the League's best defenders. Berger, unfortunately, failed to retain their League title and were knocked out of the African Champions Cup.
- 2002: Won the Nigerian Cup with Julius Berger, after defeating Yobe Stars 3–0 in the final.
- 2003: Moved to League Champions Enyimba, forming a dream partnership at the back with Romanus Orjinta. Had a standout season in an historic season for Enyimba, as they won the Nigerian League for the 3rd year running and became the first Nigerian club to win the continents' most prized club trophy – The African Champions Cup.
- 2004: Captained Enyimba as they successfully defended their African Champions League crown, by defeating Étoile du Sahel of Tunisia with a 5–3 penalty victory. Scored the vital fifth penalty that secured the win. However, this time around, Enyimba would not win Nigerian League. Agreed personal terms with South African side Orlando Pirates in July, but the deal fell through as the clubs could not agree on a fee.
- 2004–05: Moved to Tunisian powerhouse Espérance, in early 2005, where he has had an outstanding season.
- 2005–06: Selected for the Nigerian national football team for the 2006 African Cup of Nations tournament.
- 2006–07: Signed for Swiss Super League team FC Sion until June 2010.A team he captained until he left the following summer.
- 2008: Obinna score his first ever goal for Nigeria national football team at 45 minutes during 2010 FIFA World Cup qualification – CAF second round against South Africa national football team.
- 2010: After a proposed loan spell in the United Arab Emirati football club Al Dhafra fell through, Obinna Joined Kuwaiti club Kazma.
- 2011: Kazma Obinna finished his contract with Kazma and has since been linked with a host of European clubs.
- 2012: After being a free agent for 3 months, Obinna joined the 2010 Malaysia Super League champions, Kelantan FA. Obinna later won treble by winning Malaysian Super League, FA Cup and Malaysian Cup with Kelantan FA in his debut season.
- 2014: On 23 April, he was released by Kelantan FA
- 2015: After less than a year out the game he signs with ATM
- 2016: Signs with Perlis FA in Malaysian Premier League

== Career statistics ==
=== Club ===
As of 5 November 2013

Appearances and goals by club, season and competition
Club	Season	League		Other (Note: Including Malaysia Charity Shield)		National cup		League cup		Continental (Note: Including AFC Cup)		Total	
Club	Season	Apps	Goals	Apps	Goals	Apps	Goals	Apps	Goals	Apps	Goals	Apps	Goals
Kelantan	2012	18	1	1	0	5	1	11	1	6	0	40	3
Kelantan	2013	19	0	1	0	6	3	10	2	5	1	41	6
Kelantan	2014	13	0	0	0	0	0	0	0	0	0	0	0
Kelantan	Total	50	1	2	0	11	4	21	3	11	1	81	9
Career total													

== Honours ==
Enyimba

- Nigeria Premier League: Runners-up 2003–04
- African Champions League: 2003–04, 2004-2005

FC Sion

- Swiss Cup: 2008–09

Kazema SC

- Kuwaiti Emir Cup: 2010–11
- Kuwait Super Cup: Runners-up 2011

Kelantan

- Malaysia Super League: 2012
- Malaysia Cup: 2012
- Malaysia FA Cup: 2012, 2013
- Malaysia Charity Shield: Runners-up 2012, 2013
