= Personal foul =

Personal foul may refer to:

== Sports ==
=== Rules ===
- Personal foul (American football), a type of penalty in American football
- Personal foul (basketball)
- Personal foul (field lacrosse)
- Personal foul (water polo)

== Other ==
- "Personal Foul" (CSI: NY), an episode of the American television series Crime Scene Investigation
- Personal Foul (book), a tell all book written by convicted NBA referee Tim Donaghy
