= Farderin Kadir =

Malaysian footballer

Personal information
- Full name: Farderin bin Kadir
- Date of birth: 30 January 1987 (age 39)
- Place of birth: Malacca, Malaysia
- Height: 1.69 m (5 ft 6 1/2 in)
- Position: Striker

Senior career*
Years	Team	Apps	(Gls)
2005–2007	Malacca	19	(6)
2007–2008	Kuala Muda NAZA FC	21	(10)
2008–2009	→ Perlis (loan)	18	(9)
2010	Selangor	13	(2)
2011–2012	Felda United	20	(5)
2013	Terengganu	21	(4)
2014	Sime Darby		
2015–2017	PKNS FC	16	(5)
2017	→ Negeri Sembilan (loan)	11	(2)
2018	Melaka United		
2019	SAMB		

International career^{‡}
2004–2006	Malaysia U-20	9	(4)
2009–2010	Malaysia U-23	7	(2)
- * Club domestic league appearances and goals as of 23 March 2019 ‡ National team caps and goals as of 29 December 2015

Farderin bin Kadir (born 30 January 1987 in Malacca) is a former Malaysian professional footballer who mainly played as a striker or attacking midfielder. He was a member of Malaysia U-23 and Malaysia U-20 teams.

== Club career ==
Farderin started his professional career with the Malaysia U-20 squad in 2004. He played in the 2006 AFC Youth Championship in India. In 2007, season Farderin transferred to Kuala Muda NAZA. He was later loaned to Perlis FA for the 2008 Malaysia Cup. Farderin's performance attracted attention from national coach B. Sathianathan, who put him into the senior team for the 2008 Merdeka Tournament. However, he did not play a match during the tournament.

Farderin made his debut with the senior national team in an unofficial match against Zimbabwe on 12 July 2009. He also scored his first goal for the senior team in that match. Following a spell with Malaysian giants Selangor FA, he joined the newly promoted Felda United FC.

== Career statistics ==
=== Club ===
As of 28 July 2018

Appearances and goals by club, season and competition
Club	Season	League			Cup		League Cup		Continental		Total	
Club	Season	Division	Apps	Goals	Apps	Goals	Apps	Goals	Apps	Goals	Apps	Goals
Negeri Sembilan (loan)	2017	Malaysia Premier League	11	2	4	0	2	2	—		17	4
Negeri Sembilan (loan)	Total		11	2	4	0	2	2	0	0	17	4
Melaka United	2018	Malaysia Super League	4	0	2	2	0	0	—		6	2
Melaka United	Total		4	0	2	2	0	0	0	0	6	2
Career total			0	0	0	0	0	0	0	0	0	0

== Honours ==
- 2007–08 Malaysia Premier League: (gold) Champion
