= Faizal Muhamad =

Malaysian footballer

Personal information
- Full name: Mohd Faizal bin Muhamad
- Date of birth: 3 March 1989 (age 37)
- Place of birth: Marang, Terengganu, Malaysia
- Height: 1.77 m (5 ft 9 1/2 in)
- Position: Centre back

Team information
- Current team: Melaka United
- Number: 3

Youth career
- 2006–2007: Terengganu President's Cup Team

Senior career*
Years	Team	Apps	(Gls)
2007–2009	Harimau Muda	26	(0)
2010–2011	Harimau Muda A	24	(0)
2011	→ Terengganu (loan)	12	(0)
2012–2013	Terengganu	32	(1)
2014–2015	T-Team	19	(0)
2016	PDRM	13	(0)
2017–2019	Melaka United	14	(0)

International career^{‡}
2008–2010	Malaysia U-21	12	(0)
2009–2012	Malaysia U-23	2	(0)
2009–2013	Malaysia	8	(0)
- * Club domestic league appearances and goals as of July 28, 2017 ‡ National team caps and goals as of June 16, 2016

Mohd Faizal bin Muhamad (born 3 March 1989) is a Malaysian football player who plays as centre-back for Malaysian club Melaka United. He is also a former member of Malaysia senior football team and Malaysia U-23 squad.

In November 2010, Faizal was called up to the Malaysia national squad by coach K. Rajagopal for the 2010 AFF Suzuki Cup. Malaysia won the 2010 AFF Suzuki Cup title for the first time in their history. He was loaned to Terengganu FA for 2011 Malaysia Cup and helped the team reach the final before losing 2–1 to Negeri Sembilan FA. He played all 90 minutes in the final, performing a great partnership with Mohd Marzuki Yusof.

== Career statistics ==
=== Club ===
As of match played 26 June 2018.

Club	Season	League (Note: Includes league competitions such as Malaysia Super League and Malaysia Premier League)		Cup		League Cup		Asia (Note: Includes cup competitions such as AFC Champions League and AFC Cup)		Other		Total	
Club	Season	Apps	Goals	Apps	Goals	Apps	Goals	Apps	Goals	Apps	Goals	Apps	Goals
Melaka United	2017	13	0	2	0	3	0	–		–		18	0
Melaka United	2018	1	0	1	0	0	0	–		–		2	0
Melaka United	Total	14	0	3	0	3	0	–		–		20	0

== Honours ==
=== International ===
- 2010 AFF Suzuki Cup: Winner
