= G. Puaneswaran =

Malaysian footballer

Personal information
- Full name: Puaneswaran a/l Gunasekaran
- Date of birth: 27 May 1983 (age 43)
- Place of birth: Selangor, Malaysia
- Height: 1.62 m (5 ft 4 in)
- Positions: Right winger; right-back

Team information
- Current team: Ultimate
- Number: 26

Senior career*
Years	Team	Apps	(Gls)
2009–2012	Pos Malaysia	63	(32)
2013	Terengganu	22	(1)
2014–2015	Negeri Sembilan	18	(1)
2016–2018	Melaka United	46	(2)
2019–	Ultimate		
- * Club domestic league appearances and goals as of 12 June 2020

Puaneswaran a/l Gunasekaran (born 27 May 1983 in Selangor) is a Malaysian footballer who plays and for Malaysia M3 League club Ultimate F.C. Puaneswaran plays mainly as a right winger but can also plays as a right back.

== Club career ==
Puaneswaran played for Pos Malaysia FC from 2009, and helped the team win the 2009 Malaysia FAM League and promotion to 2010 Malaysia Premier League. He scored 19 goals in 2010, one less between the Golden Boot winner Zamri Hassan. Puaneswaran played with the team until 2012, sometimes as skipper of the team, as Pos Malaysia FC consolidated their place in the Premier League. For the 2013 season, Puaneswaran joined Terengganu FA.

== Career statistics ==
=== Club ===
As of 28 July 2018

Appearances and goals by club, season and competition
Club	Season	League			Cup		League Cup		Continental		Total	
Club	Season	Division	Apps	Goals	Apps	Goals	Apps	Goals	Apps	Goals	Apps	Goals
Pos Malaysia	2009	Malaysia FAM League	14	??	0	0	0	0	—		14	??
Pos Malaysia	2010	Malaysia Premier League	22	19	0	0	0	0	—		22	19
Pos Malaysia	2011	Malaysia Premier League	22	8	0	0	0	0	—		22	8
Pos Malaysia	2012	Malaysia Premier League	5	5	0	0	0	0	—		5	5
Pos Malaysia	Total		63	32	0	0	0	0	0	0	63	32
Terengganu	2013	Malaysia Super League	22	1	4	1	2	0	—		28	2
Terengganu	Total		22	1	4	1	2	0	0	0	28	2
Negeri Sembilan	2014	Malaysia Premier League	0	0	0	0	0	0	—		0	0
Negeri Sembilan	2015	Malaysia Premier League	0	1	0	0	0	0	—		0	1
Negeri Sembilan	Total		0	1	0	0	0	0	0	0	0	1
Melaka United	2016	Malaysia Super League	14	1	0	0	4	0	—		18	1
Melaka United	2017	Malaysia Super League	21	1	2	0	5	0	—		28	1
Melaka United	2018	Malaysia Super League	11	0	1	0	0	0	—		12	0
Melaka United	Total		46	2	3	0	9	0	0	0	58	2
Career total			0	0	0	0	0	0	0	0	0	0

== Honours ==
Melaka United

- Malaysia Premier League: 2016

Sporting positions
Preceded by Mohd Amri Yahyah	Melaka United captain 2017–2018	Succeeded by Khairul Fahmi
