= Khairan Ezuan Razali =

Malaysian footballer

Personal information
- Full name: Khairan Ezuan bin Razali
- Date of birth: 3 June 1986 (age 40)
- Place of birth: Kota Bharu, Kelantan, Malaysia
- Height: 1.73 m (5 ft 8 in)
- Position: Midfielder

Team information
- Current team: MPKB-BRI U-Bes F.C.

Youth career
- 2002–2003: Kelantan President Cup

Senior career*
Years	Team	Apps	(Gls)
2004–2006	TNB Kelantan	0	(0)
2006–2007	Kuala Lumpur FA	0	(0)
2007–2010	KL PLUS	0	(0)
2011	Kelantan FA	7	(0)
2012	→ Felda United FC (loan)	11	(0)
2013	Terengganu FA	13	(0)
2014	T-Team F.C.	11	(1)
2015	Real Mulia F.C.	0	(0)
2016	MPKB-BRI U-Bes F.C.	62	(29)
- * Club domestic league appearances and goals as of 27 February 2016

Khairan Ezuan Razali (born 3 June 1986 in Kota Bharu, Kelantan) is a Malaysian footballer who plays as a midfielder for MPKB-BRI U-Bes F.C. in Malaysia FAM League.
