= Syed Adney =

Malaysian footballer

Personal information
- Full name: Syed Adney bin Syed Hussein
- Date of birth: 29 November 1986 (age 39)
- Place of birth: Anfield, Liverpool, England
- Height: 1.89 m (6 ft 2 1/2 in)
- Position: Goalkeeper

Youth career
- 2004–2005: Selangor U-19
- 2004–2006: Selangor President's Cup Team

Senior career*
| Years | Team | Apps | (Gls) |
| 2007 | Selangor | 8 | |
| 2008–2009 | UPB-MyTeam | 28 | |
| 2010–2011 | Kelantan | 18 | (0) |
| 2011 | → Sabah (loan) | 24 | (0) |
| 2012 | Sabah | 28 | (0) |
| 2013 | Terengganu | 1 | (0) |
| 2014–2015 | ATM | 37 | (0) |
| 2016 | Negeri Sembilan | 26 | |
| 2017 | Penang | 14 | (0) |
| 2022 | Tun Razak FC/Harini FT | 16 | |

International career^{‡}
| 2005–2009 | Malaysia U23 | 20 | |
| 2007–2011 | Malaysia | 23 | (0) |
Medal record
Men's football
Malaysia U23
Merdeka Tournament
| Winner | 2007 |
- * Club domestic league appearances and goals as of July 17, 2017 ‡ National team caps and goals as of January 23, 2017

Syed Adney Syed Hussein (born 29 November 1986) is a former footballer who is now a football commentator and pundit in Malaysia. Born in England, he represented Malaysia internationally.

He has been capped by the Malaysian national team and also has played for the Malaysian Pre-Olympic squad.

He has openly expressed his wish to play in the English football league, and had trials with Middlesbrough FC and Darlington FC.

== Honours ==
=== Kelantan ===
- Malaysia Super League

- Runners-up : 2010

- Malaysia Cup

- Winners (1): 2010

=== Malaysia ===
- Pestabola Merdeka

- Winners (1): 2007
