= Shamsul Kamal =

Malaysian footballer

Personal information
- Full name: Shamsul Kamal Bin Mohamad
- Date of birth: 21 May 1989 (age 37)
- Place of birth: Setiu, Terengganu, Malaysia
- Height: 1.69 m (5 ft 6 1/2 in)
- Position: Defender

Team information
- Current team: Kelantan United
- Number: 20

Senior career*
Years	Team	Apps	(Gls)
2010–2011	T–Team	21	(5)
2011–2013	Terengganu	29	(2)
2014–2017	Terengganu II	10	(0)
2018	Hanelang	16	(2)
2019–	Kelantan United	21	(1)
- * Club domestic league appearances and goals as of 17 March 2019

Shamsul Kamal Bin Mohamad (born 21 May 1989) is a Malaysian professional footballer who plays for Kelantan United as a defender.
