= Jean-Emmanuel Effa Owona =

Cameroonian footballer (born 1983)

Personal information
- Date of birth: 26 December 1983 (age 42)
- Place of birth: Ikbongo, Cameroon
- Height: 1.90 m (6 ft 3 in)
- Position: Striker

Senior career*
Years	Team	Apps	(Gls)
2002–2003	Altay Izmir	20	(5)
2003–2004	Elazigspor	21	(5)
2004–2005	Ankaragücü	13	(3)
2005–2006	Malatyaspor	12	(7)
2006	LB Châteauroux	20	(8)
2006–2007	US Créteil-Lusitanos	19	(4)
2007–2008	→ FC Metz (loan)	5	(0)
2008–2010	Al-Siliya	34	(13)
2010–2011	Hatta Club Dubai	18	(2)
2012	Negeri Sembilan FA	29	(23)
2013	Terengganu FA	32	(14)
2014	Negeri Sembilan FA	8	(4)
2016	Gaziosmanpaşaspor		
2017	BB Oğuzhanspor		
2017–2018	Al-Najaf		
2019–	Al-Bahri		

International career
2006	Cameroon	1	(0)
- * Club domestic league appearances and goals as of 22 September 2013, 08:00 (UTC)

Jean-Emmanuel Effa Owona (born 26 December 1983) is a Cameroonian professional footballer who last played as a striker for Negeri Sembilan FA in the Malaysia Premier League.

== Club career ==
Owona previously played for FC Metz in the Ligue 2 of France. He also has played for club in Turkey's Super Lig such as Elazigspor, Ankaragücü and Malatyaspor.

=== Malaysia ===
Owona signed to play for Negeri Sembilan FA in the 2012 Malaysia Super League. On his debut in Malaysian football, he managed to score two goals, thus giving a 2–1 win over Kelantan FA in the 2012 Malaysia Charity Shield. This was Negeri Sembilan's first Charity Shield title since 1985. With Negeri Sembilan, Owona would end the season joint top scorer in the league, with 15 goals. He joined Terengganu FA for the 2013 Malaysia Super League season. However, after only a season with Terengganu, he returned to Negeri Sembilan, who were just relegated from the Super League and playing in the 2014 Malaysia Premier League.
