= Nik Zul Aziz =

Malaysian footballer

Personal information
- Birth name: Nik Zul Aziz bin Nik Nawawi
- Date of birth: 7 April 1987 (age 39)
- Place of birth: Terengganu, Malaysia
- Height: 1.70 m (5 ft 7 in)
- Position: Defender

Youth career
- 2009: Pahang FA President's Team

Senior career*
Years	Team	Apps	(Gls)
2010–2011	Pahang FA	21	(1)
2011–2014	Terengganu FA	15	(0)
2015	T-Team FC	18	(0)
2016	Kuala Lumpur FA	0	(0)

International career^{‡}
	Malaysia	0	(0)
- * Club domestic league appearances and goals as of January 02, 2016 ‡ National team caps and goals as of January 02, 2016

Nik Zul Aziz bin Nik Nawawi (born 7 April 1987) is a Malaysian footballer currently playing for Kuala Lumpur FA in Malaysia Premier League.
