= 2014 Terengganu FA season =

Terengganu
2014 season
- President: Wan Ahmad Nizam
- Manager: Marzuki Sulong
- Head Coach: Abdul Rahman Ibrahim
- Stadium: Sultan Ismail Nasiruddin Shah Stadium (Capacity: 10,000)
- Super League: 4th
- FA Cup: Round of 16
- Malaysia Cup: Quarter-final
- Top goalscorer: League: Nor Farhan (7); All: Nor Farhan (8)
- Highest home attendance: 13,000 vs Johor Darul Ta'zim (15 March 2014)
- Lowest home attendance: 2,700 vs LionsXII (17 May 2014)
- Average home league attendance: 7,745
Home colours	Away colours	Third colours

The 2014 season was Terengganu's 4th season in the Malaysia Super League, and their 19th consecutive season in the top-flight of Malaysian football. In addition, they were competing in the domestic tournaments, the 2013 Malaysia FA Cup and the 2013 Malaysia Cup

Terengganu announced their sponsors for the 2014 season as well as presenting the new kits on 14 January 2014.

== Club ==
=== Current coaching staff ===
Position	Name
Head coach	Abdul Rahman Ibrahim
1st Assistant coach	Ahmad Yusof
2nd Assistant coach	Subri Sulong
Reserve team coach	Zakari Alias
Goalkeeping coach	Mohd Zubir Ibrahim
Fitness Coach	Joseph Ronald D' Angelus
Physiotherapist	Zulkifli Mohd Zin
Doctor	YBHG. Dato' Dr. Syed Mohammad Salleh

=== Management ===
Position	Staff
President	Wan Ahmad Nizam
1st Vice-president	Haji Mazlan Ngah
2nd Vice-president	Marzuki Sulong
Manager	Marzuki Sulong
1st Vice-Manager	Zulkifli Ali
2nd Vice-Manager	Ahmad Awang
Security Officer	YBHG. Dato' Hj. Mokhtar Nong
Media Officer	Haslan Hashim

- Last updated: 28 October 2013

=== Kit sponsors ===
• Umbro •

Desa Murni Batik • Zon Ria • Ladang Rakyat • Kuala Terengganu Specialist Hospital • Top IT

== Players ==
=== Squad information ===
N	P	Nat.	Name	Date of birth	Age	Notes
1	GK	(Malaysia)	Mohammad Izzuddin Hussin^{LP}	19 November 1992	22	From Youth system
2	DF	(Malaysia)	Mazlizam Mohamad^{LP}	19 September 1986	28	
3	DF	(Malaysia)	Mohd Muhaimin Omar^{LP}	17 March 1989	25	
4	FW	(Malaysia)	Abdul Manaf Mamat^{LP}	8 April 1987	27	
5	DF	(Cameroon)	Vincent Bikana^{FP}	26 February 1992	22	
7	MF	(Malaysia)	Zairo Anuar^{LP}	18 June 1982	32	Team vice-captain
8	MF	(Malaysia)	Ismail Faruqi Asha'ri^{LP}	15 October 1986	28	Team captain
10	MF	(Malaysia)	Nor Farhan Muhammad^{LP}	19 December 1984	30	
11	DF	(Malaysia)	Azlan Zainal^{LP}	16 April 1986	28	
12	FW	(Malaysia)	Izzaq Faris Ramlan^{LP}	18 April 1990	24	Injured on December 2013 - New Izzaq medical report - May return on June 2014
13	DF	(Malaysia)	Hasmizan Kamarodin^{LP}	24 January 1984	30	
14	MF	(Malaysia)	Mohd Fakhrurazi Musa^{LP}	26 September 1991	23	
15	DF	(Malaysia)	Nasril Izzat Jalil^{LP}	15 April 1991	23	
16	DF	(Malaysia)	Zubir Azmi^{LP}	14 November 1991	23	
17	MF	(Malaysia)	Khairul Ramadhan^{LP}	2 February 1988	26	
18	MF	(Malaysia)	Ahmad Nordin Alias^{LP}	26 October 1985	29	
20	MF	(Australia)	Mario Karlović^{FP}	29 March 1984	30	
21	MF	(Malaysia)	Nor Hakim Hassan^{LP}	2 October 1991	23	On loan from PKNS
22	MF	(Malaysia)	Ashari Samsudin^{LP}	7 June 1985	29	
23	MF	(Malaysia)	Mohd Faiz Subri^{LP}	8 November 1987	27	
24	GK	(Malaysia)	Shamirza Yusoff^{LP}	7 June 1989	25	
25	GK	(Malaysia)	Sharbinee Allawee^{LP}	7 December 1986	28	
42	GK	(Malaysia)	Hafidz Romly^{LP}	20 September 1989	25	
45	FW	(Senegal)	Moustapha Dabo^{FP}	27 February 1986	28	
46	FW	(Colombia)	Javier Estupiñán^{FP}	8 February 1984	30	

Last update: 30 April 2014
Ordered by squad number.
^{LP}Local player; ^{FP}Foreign player; ^{NR}Non-registered player

== Transfers and loans ==
All start dates are pending confirmation.

=== In ===
==== November ====
#	Position:	Player	Transferred from	Fee	Date	Source
1	GK	(Malaysia) Izzuddin Hussin	Youth system	N/A	6 November 2013	
12	FW	(Malaysia) Izzaq Faris	(Malaysia) Harimau Muda A	Undisclosed	November 2013	
25	GK	(Malaysia) Sharbinee Allawee	(Malaysia) Selangor	Undisclosed	6 November 2013	
2	DF	(Malaysia) Mazlizam Mohamad	(Malaysia) T–Team	Undisclosed	6 November 2013	
11	DF	(Malaysia) Azlan Zainal	(Malaysia) PKNS	Undisclosed	13 November 2013	
10	MF	(Malaysia) Nor Farhan	(Malaysia) Kelantan	Undisclosed	13 November 2013	
7	MF	(Malaysia) Zairo Anuar	(Malaysia) Kelantan	Undisclosed	13 November 2013	
23	MF	(Malaysia) Faiz Subri	(Malaysia) Kelantan	Undisclosed	13 November 2013	
20	MF	(Australia) Mario Karlović	(Indonesia) Persebaya Surabaya	Undisclosed	12 December 2013	
9	FW	(Brazil) Márcio Souza	(Indonesia) Perseman Manokwari	Undisclosed	12 December 2013	
19	FW	(Guinea) Mamadou Barry	(Hong Kong) South China	Undisclosed	12 December 2013	

==== April ====
#	Position:	Player	Transferred from	Fee	Date	Source
45	FW	(Senegal) Moustapha Dabo	(Turkey) Kahramanmaraşspor	Undisclosed	1 April 2014	
46	FW	(Colombia) Javier Estupiñán	(Honduras) Parrillas One	Undisclosed	16 April 2014	
42	GK	(Malaysia) Hafidz Romly	(Malaysia) PKNS	Undisclosed	22 April 2014	

=== Out ===
==== November ====
#	Position:	Player	Transferred to	Fee	Date	Source
25	GK	(Malaysia) Wan Azraie	(Malaysia) T–Team	Undisclosed	6 November 2013	
23	DF	(Malaysia) Faizal Muhammad	(Malaysia) T–Team	Undisclosed	6 November 2013	
12	MF	(Malaysia) Khairan Ezuan	(Malaysia) T–Team	Undisclosed	6 November 2013	
20	MF	(Malaysia) Shamsul Kamal	(Malaysia) T–Team	Undisclosed	6 November 2013	
8	MF	(Malaysia) G. Puaneswaran	(Malaysia) Negeri Sembilan	Undisclosed	6 November 2013	
1	GK	(Malaysia) Syed Adney	(Malaysia) ATM	Undisclosed	29 November 2013	
10	FW	(Cameroon) Effa Owona	(Malaysia) Negeri Sembilan	Undisclosed	5 December 2013	
4	DF	(Malaysia) Qhairul Anwar	(Malaysia) Felda United	Undisclosed	12 December 2013	
9	FW	(Malaysia) Farderin Kadir	(Malaysia) Sime Darby	Undisclosed	12 December 2013	
2	DF	(Malaysia) Wan Firdaus Wan Demi	(Malaysia) Kuantan FA	Undisclosed	12 December 2013	
19	DF	(Malaysia) Rosdi Talib	Retired	Undisclosed	12 December 2013	

==== April ====
#	Position:	Player	Transferred to	Fee	Date	Source
6	DF	(Malaysia) Nik Zul Aziz	(Malaysia) T–Team	Undisclosed	24 March 2014	
9	FW	(Brazil) Márcio Souza	Free agent	Undisclosed	28 March 2014	
19	FW	(Guinea) Mamadou Barry	Free agent	Undisclosed	16 April 2014	

=== Loan in ===
#	Position:	Player	From	Fee	Until	Source
21	MF	(Malaysia) Nor Hakim Hassan	(Malaysia) PKNS	Undisclosed	30 November 2014	

== Pre-season and friendlies ==
24 December 2013 Pre-season	Perseba Bangkalan (Indonesia)	1–1	(Malaysia) Terengganu	Bangkalan, Indonesia
15:30 UTC+07:00		Report	Ramadhan	Stadium: Gelora Bangkalan Stadium

26 December 2013 Pre-season	Arema Cronous (Indonesia)	1–1	(Malaysia) Terengganu	Malang, Indonesia
15:30 UTC+07:00	Sukadana 76'	Report	Ismail 89'	Stadium: Kanjuruhan Stadium

28 December 2013 Pre-season	Markuban Matador (Indonesia)	2–3	(Malaysia) Terengganu	Jakarta, Indonesia
15:30 UTC+07:00			Barry 25'; Ashari; Zairo	Stadium: Lebak Bulus Stadium

30 December 2013 Pre-season	Gresik United (Indonesia)	2–2	(Malaysia) Terengganu	Gresik, Indonesia
15:45 UTC+07:00	Reza 21'; Pape 74'	Report	Zairo 15'; Fakhrurazi 79'	Stadium: Petrokimia Stadium

8 January 2014 Pre-season	Kuantan (Malaysia)	0–0	(Malaysia) Terengganu Team B	Kuantan, Malaysia
16:45 UTC+08:00				Stadium: Darul Makmur Stadium

11 January 2014 Pre-season	Terengganu (Malaysia)	1–1	(Malaysia) T–Team	Kuala Terengganu, Malaysia
22:00 UTC+08:00	Ashari		Azlan 2' (o.g.)	Stadium: Sultan Ismail Nasiruddin Shah Stadium; Attendance: 13,000

24 February 2014 Friendly	UiTM (Malaysia)	1–2	(Malaysia) Terengganu	Shah Alam, Malaysia
16:45 UTC+08:00			Nor Farhan; Ramadhan	Stadium: UiTM Stadium

26 February 2014 Friendly	DRB-Hicom (Malaysia)	1–4	(Malaysia) Terengganu	Subang, Malaysia
16:45 UTC+08:00	Goal		Márcio Souza; Mamadou	Stadium: Plus Mini Stadium

1 March 2014 Friendly	Hanelang (Malaysia)	0–5	(Malaysia) Terengganu	Kuala Terengganu, Malaysia
16:45 UTC+08:00			Mamadou; Manaf	Stadium: Complex Gong Badak Field

23 July 2014 Friendly	Kelantan (Malaysia)	2–1	(Malaysia) Terengganu	Kota Bharu, Malaysia
22:00 UTC+08:00	Shakir; Fitri		Dabo	Stadium: Sultan Mohammad IV Stadium

6 August 2014 Friendly	Terengganu (Malaysia)	3–1	(Malaysia) Felda United	Kuala Terengganu, Malaysia
20:45 UTC+08:00	Faiz 28'; Ashari 45'; Ramadhan 87'		Edward 6' (pen.)	Stadium: Sultan Ismail Nasiruddin Shah Stadium

Friendly	Pahang (Malaysia)	2–1	(Malaysia) Terengganu	Kuantan, Malaysia
20:45 UTC+08:00				Stadium: Darul Makmur Stadium

24 September 2014 Friendly	Terengganu (Malaysia)	3–4	Malaysia	Kuala Terengganu, Malaysia
20:45 UTC+08:00	Faruqi 38' (pen.); Ashari 40'; Faiz 43'		Safiq 31'; Azmi 35'; Badhri 53'; Manaf 59'	Stadium: Sultan Ismail Nasiruddin Shah Stadium

27 September 2014 Friendly	Terengganu (Malaysia)	3–1	(Malaysia) Kelantan	Kuala Terengganu, Malaysia
20:45 UTC+08:00	Nor Farhan 16'; Ramadhan 38'; Ashari 50'		Shakir 34'	Stadium: Sultan Ismail Nasiruddin Shah Stadium

== Super League ==
=== League table ===
Pos	Team	Pld	W	D	L	GF	GA	GD	Pts	Qualification or relegation
2	Selangor	22	12	5	5	28	19	+9	41	
3	Pahang	22	11	4	7	36	30	+6	37	2015 AFC Cup group stage (Note: Qualified as 2014 Piala FA winners)
4	Terengganu	22	10	6	6	38	28	+10	36	
5	Sime Darby	22	9	4	9	32	32	0	31	
6	Kelantan	22	10	1	11	26	29	−3	31	

Source: RSSSF, FAM Official Site, Astro Arena
Rules for classification: 1) points; 2) goal difference; 3) number of goals scored

==== Results summary ====
Overall								Home						Away					
Pld	W	D	L	GF	GA	GD	Pts	W	D	L	GF	GA	GD	W	D	L	GF	GA	GD
22	10	6	6	38	28	+10	36	6	2	3	17	13	+4	4	4	3	21	15	+6

Last updated: 26 June 2014.
Source: Competitive matches

==== Results by round ====
Round	1	2	3	4	5	6	7	8	9	10	11	12	13	14	15	16	17	18	19	20	21	22
Ground	H	A	H	A	H	A	H	A	A	H	A	H	A	H	A	H	A	H	A	H	H	A
Result	W	L	W	D	W	D	W	L	W	W	W	L	D	L	D	W	W	L	L	D	D	W
Position	5	8	2	3	1	1	1	1	2	2	3	4	5	4	3	3	3	3	4	4	4	4

Updated to match(es) played on 26 June 2014. Source: Competitive Matches
A = Away; H = Home; W = Win; D = Draw; L = Loss

=== Matches ===
Win Draw Loss
Kickoff times are in +08:00 GMT.

18 January 2014 1	Terengganu	2–1	PKNS	Kuala Terengganu
20:45	Mamadou 22', 66'; Nordin (yellow card) 55'	Report	Hamka 18'; Fauzan (yellow card) 27'	Stadium: Sultan Ismail Nasiruddin Shah Stadium; Attendance: 10,000; Referee: Nagor Amir; Man of the Match: Mamadou

25 January 2014 2	Perak	1–0	Terengganu	Ipoh
20:45	Eliel 90+3'	Report	Nor Farhan (yellow card) 44'; Zairo (yellow card) 61'; Bikana (yellow card) 74'	Stadium: Perak Stadium; Attendance: 15,000; Referee: Nazmi Nasaruddin

28 January 2014 3	Terengganu	2–0	T–Team	Kuala Terengganu
20:45	Márcio 45+3'; Ashari 59'	Report		Stadium: Sultan Ismail Nasiruddin Shah Stadium; Attendance: 6,000; Referee: Syed Azhar; Man of the Match: Ashari

8 February 2014 4	LionsXII	0–0	Terengganu	Kallang
19:45	Gabriel (yellow card) 40'	Report	Mamadou (yellow card) 9'; Mazlizam (yellow card) 48'; Fakhrurazi (yellow card) 72'	Stadium: Jalan Besar Stadium; Attendance: 6,000; Referee: Wan Muhammad Tarmizi

15 February 2014 5	Terengganu	2–0	Pahang	Kuala Terengganu
20:45	Karlović 21'; Márcio (yellow card) 65'; Faruqi 70', (yellow card) 77'	Report	Rehman (yellow card) 44'; Nwakaeme (yellow card) 55'; Faizol (yellow card) 87'	Stadium: Sultan Ismail Nasiruddin Shah Stadium; Attendance: 10,000; Referee: Syed Azhar; Man of the Match: Bikana

4 May 2014 6	Selangor	0–0	Terengganu	Shah Alam
20:45			Nordin (yellow card) 45'; Faruqi (yellow card) 45+2'	Stadium: Shah Alam Stadium; Attendance: 15,000; Referee: Syed Azhar

15 March 2014 7	Terengganu	1–0	Johor Darul Takzim	Kuala Terengganu
20:45	Bikana 17'; Márcio (yellow card) 85'; Fakhrurazi (yellow card) 90+2'	Report	Shakir (yellow card) 90+3'	Stadium: Sultan Ismail Nasiruddin Shah Stadium; Attendance: 13,000; Referee: Nagor Amir; Man of the Match: Sharbinee

22 March 2014 8	Sime Darby	3–2	Terengganu	Selayang
20:45	Nazrul 7'; Fazrul Hazli 45+2'; Farid 50' (pen.); Mensah (yellow card) 66' (yellow-red card); Yosri (yellow card) 83'; Juzaili (yellow card) 87'	Report	Faruqi 24'; Azlan (yellow card) 50'; Nor Farhan 72'	Stadium: Selayang Stadium; Attendance: 3,500; Referee: Fairuzi Mat Desa

25 March 2014 9	ATM	0–3	Terengganu	Selayang
20:45	Fauzi (yellow card) 32'		Manaf 24'; Faruqi (yellow card) 56'; Zubir (yellow card) 69'; Nor Farhan 78'; Faiz 90+4'	Stadium: Selayang Stadium; Attendance: 1,000; Referee: Wan Mohd Tarmizi; Man of the Match: Faruqi

29 Mac 2014 10	Terengganu	3–0	Kelantan	Kuala Terengganu
20:45	Faruqi (yellow card) 60'	Report	Amar (yellow card) 59'; Gan (yellow card) 77'; Shawky (yellow card) 90+3'	Stadium: Sultan Ismail Nasiruddin Shah Stadium; Attendance: 13,000
Note: FAM have given Terengganu a 3-0 win after Kelantan fielded player who was suspended at the time

4 April 2014 11	Sarawak	1–3	Terengganu	Kuching
20:45	Aya 30'		Zairo 21', (yellow card) 29'; Dabo 65'; Nor Farhan 70'	Stadium: Sarawak State Stadium; Attendance: 15,000; Referee: Wan Mohd Tarmizi; Man of the Match: Sharbinee

11 April 2014 12	Terengganu	1–2	Sarawak	Kuala Terengganu
20:45	Eldstål 37' (o.g.); Zubir (yellow card) 52'; Faruqi (yellow card) 67'		S. Chanturu 3'; Griffiths 75'; Fadzley (yellow card) 81'; Eldstål (yellow card) 90+4'	Stadium: Sultan Ismail Nasiruddin Shah Stadium; Attendance: 7,000; Referee: Zohri Tajuddin

15 April 2014 13	PKNS	2–2	Terengganu	Shah Alam
20:45	Khairu (yellow card) 59'; Wleh 63'; P. Gunalan 79'; Nazmi (yellow card) 79'		Azlan 23', (yellow card) 87'; Karlović 44'; Sharbinee (yellow card) 69'	Stadium: Shah Alam Stadium; Attendance: 800; Referee: Fairuzi Mohd Desa

19 April 2014 14	Terengganu	0–2	Perak	Kuala Terengganu
20:45	Azlan (yellow card) 90'		Nasir (yellow card) 17'; J. Partiban 29', (yellow card) 47'; Abdulsalam (yellow card) 60'; Tulio 72', (yellow card) 90'; Razi (yellow card) 75'	Stadium: Sultan Ismail Nasiruddin Shah Stadium; Attendance: 3,000; Referee: Zulkifli Ahmad

10 May 2014 15	T–Team	1–1	Terengganu	Kuala Terengganu
20:45	Faizal (yellow card) 35'; Marzuki (yellow card) 39'; Fazli (yellow card) 75'; Mulisa 77'		Nor Farhan (yellow card) 14'; Zairo 36'; Dabo (yellow card) 43'; Karlović (yellow card) 73'; Bikana (yellow card) 82'	Stadium: Sultan Ismail Nasiruddin Shah Stadium; Attendance: 1,500; Referee: Zulkifli Ahmad

17 May 2014 16	Terengganu	2–1	LionsXII	Kuala Terengganu
20:45	Estupiñán 11'; Faruqi (yellow card) 40'; Zairo 69' (pen.); Zubir (yellow card) 89'		Amri 8'; Raihan (yellow card) 36'; Izwan (yellow card) 68'	Stadium: Sultan Ismail Nasiruddin Shah Stadium; Attendance: 2,700; Referee: Zamzaidi Kartimin; Man of the Match: Zairo

24 May 2014 17	Pahang	1–4	Terengganu	Kuantan
20:45	Stewart 65'; Razman (yellow card) 78' (yellow-red card); Nwakaeme (yellow card) 90+1'		Estupiñán 17'; Manaf 45+1'; Zairo 90+2'; Ashari 90+4'	Stadium: Darul Makmur Stadium; Attendance: 15,000; Referee: Syed Azhar; Man of the Match: Ashari

10 June 2014 18	Terengganu	1–4	Selangor	Kuala Terengganu
20:45	Dabo 52'; Zairo (yellow card) 65'	Report	Rangel 45+2', (red card) 45+4'; Hadi 48' (pen.); Andik (yellow card) 61'; Farizal (yellow card) 78'; S. Veenod 89'; S. Kunalan 90+2'	Stadium: Sultan Ismail Nasiruddin Shah Stadium; Attendance: 11,000; Referee: Nafeez Abd Wahab

14 June 2014 19	Johor Darul Takzim	4–2	Terengganu	Johor Bahru
20:45	Díaz 21', 37', 53' (pen.); Mahali 45'; Daudsu (yellow card) 90+3'	Report	Dabo 4', (yellow card) 53'; Nor Farhan 17'; Azlan (yellow card) 24'; Bikana 84'	Stadium: Tan Sri Dato Hj Hassan Yunos Stadium; Attendance: 18,000; Referee: Wan Mohd Tarmizi

17 June 2014 20	Terengganu	2–2	Sime Darby	Kuala Terengganu
20:45	Karlović 5'; Nor Farhan 14'		Mensah 69'; Mahmoud 71'	Stadium: Sultan Ismail Nasiruddin Shah Stadium; Attendance: 1,800; Referee: Zamzaidi Kartimin

21 June 2014 21	Terengganu	1–1	ATM	Kuala Terengganu
20:45	Azlan (yellow card) 58'; Nor Farhan 60'		Noël 64'	Stadium: Sultan Ismail Nasiruddin Shah Stadium; Attendance: 1,600; Referee: Nagor Amir; Man of the Match: Nor Farhan

25 June 2014 22	Kelantan	2–3	Terengganu	Kota Bharu
20:45	Fakri 4'; Khairul 27'; Tuan Faim (yellow card) 77'	Report	Manaf (yellow card) 44', (goal) 74', 79'; Zairo (yellow card) 61'; Nor Farhan 81'	Stadium: Sultan Muhammad IV Stadium; Attendance: 3,000; Referee: Jefri Zulkifli; Man of the Match: Manaf

== FA Cup ==
Terengganu entered the 2014 Malaysia FA Cup in January, in the round of 16. First opponent was Shahzan Muda.

=== Round of 32 ===
21 January 2014 1st round	Terengganu	4–0	Shahzan Muda	Kuala Terengganu
20:45	Marcio 11', 42'; Manaf 36'; Zubir (yellow card) 62'; Zairo 77'	Report	Faizal Musa (yellow card) 12'	Stadium: Sultan Ismail Nasiruddin Shah Stadium; Attendance: 5,000; Referee: Nafeez Abd Wahab; Man of the Match: Manaf

=== Round of 16 ===
4 February 2014 2nd round	PKNS	2–1	Terengganu	Seremban
20:45	Wleh 37'; Ghani (red card) 55'; Primorac 79'; Gunalan (yellow card) 81'	Report	Mamadou (yellow card) 43'; Ismail 48' (yellow card) 73'	Stadium: Tuanku Abdul Rahman Stadium; Attendance: 500; Referee: Azman Jamaluddin

== Malaysia Cup ==
=== Group stage ===
Team	Pld	W	D	L	GF	GA	GD	Pts
Kedah (A)	6	3	1	2	11	9	+2	10
Terengganu (A)	6	2	3	1	10	9	+1	9
Perak	6	2	2	2	7	7	0	8
Sarawak	6	1	2	3	6	9	−3	5

(A) Advanced to the 2014 Piala Malaysia quarter finals

14 August 2014 1	Sarawak	3–2	Terengganu	Kuching
20:45	Griffiths 9' (pen.), 30'; Chanturu 45+2'; Dzulazlan (yellow card) 62'; Hairol (yellow card) 70'		Karlović 58'; Nor Farhan (yellow card) 64'; Zairo 73' (pen.); Zubir (yellow card) 90+1'	Stadium: Sarawak State Stadium; Attendance: 8,000; Referee: Zulkifli Ahmad

20 August 2014 2	Kedah	2–3	Terengganu	Alor Setar
20:45	Mehmet 45+2'; Baddrol 59'		Ashari 8', 45'; Hasmizan (yellow card) 58'; Karlović 74'; Fakhrurazi (yellow card) 88'	Stadium: Darul Aman Stadium; Attendance: 6,000; Referee: Nagor Amir; Man of the Match: Ashari

23 August 2014 3	Terengganu	2–1	Perak	Kuala Terengganu
20:45	Manaf 30'; Ramadhan (yellow card) 49'; Nor Farhan 50'; Muhaimin (yellow card) 70'; Mazlizam (yellow card) 86'		Nazri 32'	Stadium: Sultan Ismail Nasiruddin Shah Stadium; Attendance: 7,000; Referee: Teoh Hee Loon; Man of the Match: Nor Farhan

27 August 2014 4	Perak	1–1	Terengganu	Ipoh
20:45	Bikana 47' (o.g.); Raffi (yellow card) 70'		Nordin 88'	Stadium: Perak Stadium; Attendance: 10,000; Referee: Nazmi Nasaruddin; Man of the Match: Nordin

30 August 2014 5	Terengganu	2–2	Kedah	Kuala Terengganu
20:45	Ashari 36'; Faruqi (yellow card) 66', (goal) 78'		Rizal (yellow card) 45'; Baddrol 45+2'; Namkung (yellow card) 45+2', (goal) 69'; Syafiq (yellow card) 87'	Stadium: Sultan Ismail Nasiruddin Shah Stadium; Attendance: 6,500; Referee: Zulkifli Ahmad

3 September 2014 6	Terengganu	0–0	Sarawak	Kuala Terengganu
20:45				Stadium: Sultan Ismail Nasiruddin Shah Stadium; Attendance: 6,000; Referee: Lismotea Mohem; Man of the Match: Bikana

=== Knockout phase ===
==== Quarter-finals ====
10 October 2014 First leg	Terengganu	0–0	Johor Darul Takzim	Kuala Terengganu
20:45			Shakir (yellow card) 90+2'	Stadium: Sultan Ismail Nasiruddin Shah Stadium; Attendance: 11,000; Referee: Nagor Amir; Man of the Match: Bikana

16 October 2014 Second leg	Johor Darul Takzim	3–1 (3–1 agg.)	Terengganu	Johor Bahru
20:45	Safiq 16', 75'; Figueroa 22'; Aidil (yellow card) 69'; Díaz (yellow card) 70'		Zubir (yellow card) 15'; Ashari 60'; Bikana (yellow card) 87'	Stadium: Tan Sri Dato Haji Hassan Yunos Stadium; Attendance: 30,000; Referee: Nagor Amir

Source: FAM
Last updated: 18 July 2014

== Statistics ==
=== Squad statistics ===
No.	Pos	Nat	Player	Total		Super League		FA Cup		Malaysia Cup	
No.	Pos	Nat	Player	Apps	Goals	Apps	Goals	Apps	Goals	Apps	Goals
Goalkeepers
1	GK	(Malaysia) MAS	Izzuddin Hussin	0	0	0	0	0	0	0	0
24	GK	(Malaysia) MAS	Shamirza Yusoff	4	0	2+1	0	1	0	0	0
25	GK	(Malaysia) MAS	Sharbinee Allawee	29	0	20	0	1	0	8	0
42	GK	(Malaysia) MAS	Hafidz Romly	0	0	0	0	0	0	0	0
Defenders
2	DF	(Malaysia) MAS	Mazlizam Mohamad	21	0	15	0	2	0	3+1	0
3	DF	(Malaysia) MAS	Muhaimin Omar	6	0	1	0	0	0	4+1	0
5	DF	(Cameroon) CMR	Vincent Bikana	32	2	22	2	2	0	8	0
11	DF	(Malaysia) MAS	Azlan Zainal	19	1	17	1	1	0	1	0
13	DF	(Malaysia) MAS	Hasmizan Kamarodin	17	0	7+2	0	1	0	7	0
15	DF	(Malaysia) MAS	Nasril Izzat	7	0	2+4	0	0	0	1	0
16	DF	(Malaysia) MAS	Zubir Azmi	31	0	21	0	2	0	8	0
Midfielders
7	MF	(Malaysia) MAS	Zairo Anuar	29	6	13+6	4	0+2	1	2+6	1
8	MF	(Malaysia) MAS	Ismail Faruqi	24	4	13+3	2	1	1	3+4	1
10	MF	(Malaysia) MAS	Nor Farhan Muhammad	28	8	18+1	7	0+1	0	8	1
14	MF	(Malaysia) MAS	Fakhrurazi Musa	16	0	0+11	0	1	0	0+4	0
17	MF	(Malaysia) MAS	Khairul Ramadhan	5	0	0+1	0	0	0	2+2	0
18	MF	(Malaysia) MAS	Nordin Alias	31	1	20+1	0	2	0	8	1
20	MF	(Australia) AUS	Mario Karlović	29	5	13+7	3	0+1	0	8	2
21	MF	(Malaysia) MAS	Nor Hakim Hassan	10	0	4+4	0	2	0	0	0
22	MF	(Malaysia) MAS	Ashari Samsudin	29	6	15+4	2	2	0	8	4
23	MF	(Malaysia) MAS	Faiz Subri	14	1	5+4	1	0	0	2+3	0
Forwards
4	FW	(Malaysia) MAS	Manaf Mamat	18	6	7+3	4	1	1	6+1	1
12	FW	(Malaysia) MAS	Izzaq Faris	0	0	0	0	0	0	0	0
45	FW	(Senegal) SEN	Moustapha Dabo	13	3	10+2	3	0	0	0+1	0
46	FW	(Colombia) COL	Javier Estupiñán	10	2	6+2	2	0	0	1+1	0
Transfers Out
–	DF	(Malaysia) MAS	Nik Zul Aziz	0	0	0	0	0	0	0	0
–	FW	(Brazil) BRA	Márcio Souza	8	3	6	1	2	2	0	0
–	FW	(Guinea) GUI	Mamadou Barry	11	2	5+5	2	1	0	0	0

Last updated: 16 October 2014
Source: Competitions

=== Top scorers ===
Rank	Player	Position	Super League	FA Cup	Malaysia Cup	Total
1	(Malaysia) Nor Farhan Muhammad	MF	7	0	1	8
2	(Malaysia) Ashari Samsudin	MF	2	0	4	6
2	(Malaysia) Zairo Anuar	MF	4	1	1	6
2	(Malaysia) Manaf Mamat	FW	4	1	1	6
5	(Australia) Mario Karlović	MF	3	0	2	5
6	(Malaysia) Ismail Faruqi	MF	2	1	1	4
7	(Brazil) Márcio Souza	FW	1	2	0	3
7	(Senegal) Moustapha Dabo	FW	3	0	0	3
9	(Guinea) Mamadou Barry	FW	2	0	0	2
9	(Colombia) Javier Estupiñán	FW	2	0	0	2
9	(Cameroon) Vincent Bikana	DF	2	0	0	2
12	(Malaysia) Faiz Subri	MF	1	0	0	1
12	(Malaysia) Azlan Zainal	DF	1	0	0	1
12	(Malaysia) Nordin Alias	MF	0	0	1	1
Total			39	5	11	55

Last updated: 16 October 2014
Source: Match reports in Competitive matches

=== Clean sheets ===
Rank	Player	Position	Super League	FA Cup	Malaysia Cup	Total
1	(Malaysia) Sharbinee Allawee	GK	5	0	0	5
2	(Malaysia) Shamirza Yusoff	GK	0	1	0	1
Total			5	1	0	6

Last updated: 25 March 2014
Source: Match reports in Competitive matches

=== Disciplinary record ===
N	P	Nat.	Name	Super League			FA Cup			Malaysia Cup			Total			Notes
N	P	Nat.	Name	Yellow card	Second yellow card	Red card	Yellow card	Second yellow card	Red card	Yellow card	Second yellow card	Red card	Yellow card	Second yellow card	Red card	Notes
8	CM	(Malaysia)	Ismail Faruqi	5			1			1			7			
11	CB	(Malaysia)	Azlan Zainal	5									5			
16	LB	(Malaysia)	Zubir Azmi	2			1			2			5			
7	CM	(Malaysia)	Zairo Anuar	4									4			
10	RW	(Malaysia)	Nor Farhan Muhammad	2						1			3			
14	CM	(Malaysia)	Fakhrurazi Musa	2						1			3			
5	CB	(Cameroon)	Vincent Bikana	2						1			3			
18	CM	(Malaysia)	Nordin Alias	2									2			
45	CF	(Senegal)	Moustapha Dabo	2									2			
2	RB	(Malaysia)	Mazlizam Mohamad	1						1			2			
25	GK	(Malaysia)	Sharbinee Allawee	1									1			
20	CM	(Australia)	Mario Karlović	1									1			
4	FW	(Malaysia)	Manaf Mamat	1									1			
13	CB	(Malaysia)	Hasmizan Kamarodin							1			1			
17	LM	(Malaysia)	Khairul Ramadhan							1			1			
3	RB	(Malaysia)	Muhaimin Omar							1			1			

Last updated: 16 October 2014
Source: Competitive matches
Ordered by (red card) , (second yellow card) and (yellow card)
(yellow card) = Number of bookings; (second yellow card) = Number of sending offs after a second yellow card; (red card) = Number of sending offs by a direct red card.

=== Scoring records ===
- First goal of the season in Super League: Mamadou Barry against PKNS (18 January 2014)
- First goal of the season in FA Cup: Márcio Souza against Shahzan Muda (21 January 2014)
- First goal of the season in Cup:
- Fastest goal of the season in Super League: 11 minutes Javier Estupiñán against LionsXII (17 May 2014)
- Fastest goal of the season in FA Cup: 11 minutes Márcio Souza against Shahzan Muda (21 January 2014)
- Fastest goal of the season in Cup:
- Biggest win of the season in Super League: 4–1 vs Pahang (24 May 2014)
- Biggest win of the season in FA Cup: 4–0 vs Shahzan Muda (21 January 2014)
- Biggest win of the season in Cup:
- Biggest loss of the season in Super League: 2–0 vs Perak (19 April 2014)
- Biggest loss of the season in FA Cup:
- Biggest loss of the season in Cup:

== See also ==
- 2014 Malaysia Super League season
