= 2012 Terengganu FA season =

Terengganu
2012 season
- President: Che Mat Jusoh
- Manager: Marzuki Sulong
- Head Coach: Peter Butler
- Stadium: Sultan Ismail Nasiruddin Shah Stadium
- Super League: 5th
- FA Cup: Semi-finals
- Malaysia Cup: Group-stage
- AFC Cup: Round of 16
- Top goalscorer: League: Forkey Doe (15); All: Forkey Doe (18)
Home colours	Away colours

The 2012 season was Terengganu's 2nd season in the Malaysia Super League, and their 18th consecutive season in the top-flight of Malaysian football. In addition, they were competing in the domestic tournaments, the 2012 Malaysia FA Cup and the 2012 Malaysia Cup

== Coaching staff ==
Position	Name
Manager	(Malaysia) Marzuki Sulong
Assistant Manager 1	(Malaysia) Zulkifli Ali
Assistant Manager 2	(Malaysia) Ahmad Awang
Head team coach	(Malaysia) Mat Zan Mat Aris (until 04 Nov)
Head team coach	(England) Peter James Butler (14 May 2012)
Assistant coach	(Malaysia) Mohammad Nik
Reserve team coach	(Malaysia) Zakari Alias
Goalkeeping coach	(Malaysia) Mohd Zubir Ibrahim
Fitness Coach	(Malaysia) Joseph Ronald D' Angelus
Physiotherapist	(Malaysia) Dato' Dr. Syed Mohd Salleh Syed Yussof Al-Zawawi
Kit manager	(Malaysia) Suhaimi Muhamad

=== Kit sponsors ===
- Specs
- Top IT
- PFCE
- Happy
- Sinar Harian
- Express Perdana
- Zaid Enterprise
- Super Jantan

== Players ==
Terengganu FA squad 2012.

=== First team squad ===
No.	Name	Nationality	Position	Age
Goalkeepers
1	Muhd Saifuddin Mokhtar	(Malaysia)	GK	
24	Mohd Sharmiza Yusoff	(Malaysia)	GK	23
25	Mohd Sharbinee Allawee Ramli	(Malaysia)	GK	26
Defenders
2	Mohd Muslim Ahmad (third-captain)	(Malaysia)	CB	23
3	Mohd Muhaimin Omar	(Malaysia)	RB	23
4	Hariri Mohd Safii	(Malaysia)	RB	23
5	Nik Zul Aziz Nawawi	(Malaysia)	LB	25
13	Hasmizan Kamarodin	(Malaysia)	CB	28
15	Mazlizam Mohamad	(Malaysia)	CB	26
16	Mohd Zubir Azmi	(Malaysia)	LB	21
17	Mohd Marzuki Yusof (captain)	(Malaysia)	CB	31
23	Mohd Faizal Muhammad (vice-captain)	(Malaysia)	CB	23
Midfielders
6	Erison Baiano	(Brazil)	CM	31
7	Reeshafiq Alwi	(Malaysia)	CM	30
10	Ismail Faruqi Asha'ri	(Malaysia)	CM	26
12	Joseph Kalang Tie	(Malaysia)	RW	25
18	Ahmad Nordin Alias	(Malaysia)	CM	27
19	Abdul Shukor Jusoh	(Malaysia)	CM	23
20	Shamsul Kamal Mohamad	(Malaysia)	RW	23
22	Ashaari Shamsuddin	(Malaysia)	LW	27
28	Mohd Fakhrurazi Musa	(Malaysia)	LW	21
Forwards
8	Ailim Fahmi Kamaruddin	(Malaysia)	FW	
9	Forkey Doe	(Liberia)	FW	27
11	Abdul Manaf Mamat	(Malaysia)	FW	25
14	Abdul Hadi Yahya	(Malaysia)	FW	27

== Competitions ==
=== Super League ===
The fixtures for the 2012 season were announced on 10 January 2012.

==== League table ====
Pos	Team	Pld	W	D	L	GF	GA	GD	Pts	Qualification or relegation
3	Selangor (Q)	26	12	7	7	40	26	+14	43	2013 AFC Cup group stage (Note: Qualified as the next highest-placed local team behind Liga Super and 2012 Piala FA winners Kelantan.)
4	Perak	26	13	3	10	40	43	−3	42	
5	Terengganu	26	11	8	7	41	33	+8	41	
6	Negeri Sembilan	26	10	7	9	41	38	+3	37	
7	PKNS	26	8	11	7	35	35	0	35	

Source: RSSSF
Rules for classification: 1) points; 2) goal difference; 3) number of goals scored
(Q) Qualified for the phase indicated

==== Results summary ====
Overall								Home						Away					
Pld	W	D	L	GF	GA	GD	Pts	W	D	L	GF	GA	GD	W	D	L	GF	GA	GD
26	11	8	7	41	33	+8	41	6	6	1	25	14	+11	5	2	6	16	19	−3

Last updated: 14 July 2012.
Source: Competitive matches

==== Results by round ====
Round	1	2	3	4	5	6	7	8	9	10	11	12	13	14	15	16	17	18	19	20	21	22	23	24	25	26
Ground	A	H	A	H	A	H	A	H	A	H	H	A	H	A	H	A	H	A	H	A	H	A	H	A	A	H
Result	L	W	W	W	W	D	L	D	W	W	D	L	W	D	D	L	D	W	L	D	D	L	W	W	L	W

Updated to match(es) played on 14 July 2012. Source: Competitive Matches
A = Away; H = Home; W = Win; D = Draw; L = Loss

==== Matches ====
Win Draw Loss

Kickoff times are in +08:00 GMT.

10 January 2012 1	Perak FA	1 – 0	Terengganu FA	Ipoh
20:45	Kubala 76'			Stadium: Perak Stadium

14 January 2012 2	Terengganu FA	3 – 0	(Kuala Lumpur) FELDA United FC	Kuala Terengganu
20:45	Ismail 11'; Ashaari 73', 90+3'			Stadium: Sultan Ismail Nasiruddin Shah Stadium

17 January 2012 3	Sarawak FA	0 – 1	Terengganu FA	Kuching
20:15			Doe 36'	Stadium: Sarawak State Stadium

21 January 2012 4	Terengganu FA	2 – 1	(Terengganu) T-Team FC	Kuala Terengganu
20:45	Doe 21', 61'		Zairo 12' (pen.)	Stadium: Sultan Ismail Nasiruddin Shah Stadium

28 January 2012 5	LionsXII (Singapore)	0 – 1	Terengganu FA	Kallang
19:45			Doe 79'	Stadium: Jalan Besar Stadium

8 February 2012 6	Terengganu FA	1 – 1	(Selangor) PKNS FC	Kuala Terengganu
20:45	Doe 37'		Helmi 47'	Stadium: Sultan Ismail Nasiruddin Shah Stadium

11 February 2012 7	Kelantan FA	2 – 1	Terengganu FA	Kota Bharu
20:45	Norshahrul 37'; Badri 54'		Manaf 90+3'	Stadium: Sultan Mohammad IV Stadium

14 February 2012 8	Terengganu FA	1 – 1	Kedah FA	Kuala Terengganu
20:45	Ashaari 45'		Khyril 73'	Stadium: Sultan Ismail Nasiruddin Shah Stadium

3 March 2012 9	Kuala Lumpur FA	0 – 1	Terengganu FA	Ayer Keroh
20:45			Doe 61'	Stadium: Hang Jebat Stadium

17 March 2012 10	Terengganu FA	6 – 3	Sabah FA	Kuala Terengganu
20:45	Ashaari 5'; Doe 13', 15', 78'; Manaf 24'; Joseph 80'		Zainizam 35'; Gan 45'; Rozaimi 66'	Stadium: Sultan Ismail Nasiruddin Shah Stadium

31 March 2012 11	Terengganu FA	0 – 0	Johor FC	Kuala Terengganu
20:45				Stadium: Sultan Ismail Nasiruddin Shah Stadium

7 April 2012 12	Selangor FA	6 – 1	Terengganu FA	Petaling Jaya
20:45	Boško 25'; Solehin 36'; Amri 37', 80'; Safiq 45+1'; Famirul 86'		Ismail 9'	Stadium: Petaling Jaya Stadium

14 April 2012 13	Terengganu FA	1 – 0	Negeri Sembilan FA	Kuala Terengganu
20:45	S. Kunalan 70' (o.g.)			Stadium: Sultan Ismail Nasiruddin Shah Stadium

17 April 2012 14	Negeri Sembilan FA	1 – 1	Terengganu FA	Paroi
20:45	Owona 22'		Doe 5' (pen.)	Stadium: Tuanku Abdul Rahman Stadium

4 May 2012 15	Terengganu FA	2 – 2	Perak FA	Kuala Terengganu
20:45	Joseph 1', 84'		Rafiuddin 41'; Bodjongo 65'	Stadium: Sultan Ismail Nasiruddin Shah Stadium

12 May 2012 16	FELDA United FC (Kuala Lumpur)	2 – 1	Terengganu FA	Ayer Keroh
20:45	Raimi 53'; Curier 65'		Ismail 23'	Stadium: Hang Jebat Stadium

15 May 2012 17	Terengganu FA	2 – 2	Sarawak FA	Kuala Terengganu
20:45	Hadi 47'; Baiano 68'		Azizan 39'; Khairul 54'	Stadium: Sultan Ismail Nasiruddin Shah Stadium

15 June 2012 18	T-Team FC (Terengganu)	0 – 3	Terengganu FA	Kuala Terengganu
20:45			Manaf 26', 42'; Hadi 78'	Stadium: Sultan Ismail Nasiruddin Shah Stadium

19 June 2012 19	Terengganu FA	0 – 1	(Singapore) LionsXII	Kuala Terengganu
20:45			Sufian 90'	Stadium: Sultan Ismail Nasiruddin Shah Stadium

23 June 2012 20	PKNS FC (Selangor)	2 – 2	Terengganu FA	Petaling Jaya
20:45	Fauzan 31'; Niçoise 37' (pen.)		Shukor 3'; Ashaari 90'	Stadium: Petaling Jaya Stadium

26 June 2012 21	Terengganu FA	2 – 2	Kelantan FA	Kuala Terengganu
20:45	Hadi 40'; Muslim 50'		Nor Farhan 5'; Badri 20'	Stadium: Sultan Ismail Nasiruddin Shah Stadium

30 June 2012 22	Kedah FA	2 – 1	Terengganu FA	Alor Setar
20:45	Khyril 21'; Baddrol 69'		Muslim 3'	Stadium: Darul Aman Stadium

3 July 2012 23	Terengganu FA	2 – 1	Kuala Lumpur FA	Kuala Terengganu
20:45	Doe 13', 84'		Okine 30' (pen.)	Stadium: Sultan Ismail Nasiruddin Shah Stadium

7 July 2012 24	Sabah FA	1 – 3	Terengganu FA	Kota Kinabalu
20:15	Rozaimi 6'		Joseph 4'; Ashaari 44'; Reithaudin 77' (o.g.)	Stadium: Likas Stadium

10 July 2012 25	Johor FC	2 – 0	Terengganu FA	Pasir Gudang
20:45	Fernando 27'; Shahrizal Saad 35'			Stadium: Pasir Gudang Corporation Stadium

14 July 2012 26	Terengganu FA	3 – 0	Selangor FA	Kuala Terengganu
20:45	Doe 9', 42'; Nordin 48'			Stadium: Sultan Ismail Nasiruddin Shah Stadium

=== FA Cup ===
Win Draw Loss

Knockout stage

18 February 2012 Round of 32	Terengganu FA	4 – 0	(Malaysia) PDRM FA	Kuala Terengganu
20:45	Hadi 10'; Manaf 39', 66'; Doe 81'			Stadium: Sultan Ismail Nasiruddin Shah Stadium

10 March 2012 Round of 16	Terengganu FA	1 – 0	Perak FA	Kuala Terengganu
20:45	Ashaari 45+4'			Stadium: Sultan Ismail Nasiruddin Shah Stadium

Quarter-finals

24 March 2012 1st leg	Terengganu FA	1 – 0	(Singapore) LionsXII	Kuala Terengganu
20:45	Joseph 66'			Stadium: Sultan Ismail Nasiruddin Shah Stadium

27 March 2012 2nd leg	LionsXII (Singapore)	0 – 0 (0 – 1 agg.)	Terengganu FA	Kallang
19:45				Stadium: Jalan Besar Stadium

Semi-finals

21 April 2012 1st leg	Terengganu FA	1 – 2	(Kuala Lumpur) Sime Darby FC	Kuala Terengganu
20:45	Doe 66'		Wleh 52'; Syukur 90+3'	Stadium: Sultan Ismail Nasiruddin Shah Stadium

1 May 2012 2nd leg	Sime Darby FC (Kuala Lumpur)	0 – 0 (2 – 1 agg.)	Terengganu FA	Selayang
20:45				Stadium: Majlis Perbandaran Selayang Stadium

=== Malaysia Cup ===
A total of 16 teams took part in the competition. The teams were divided into 4 groups of 4 teams. The group leaders and runners-up teams in the groups after 6 matches qualified to the quarterfinals.

==== Group stage ====
Pos	Team	Pld	W	D	L	GF	GA	GD	Pts
1	Kelantan FA (A)	6	3	2	1	13	8	+5	11
2	ATM FA (A)	6	3	2	1	12	8	+4	11
3	Kedah FA	6	1	3	2	6	8	−2	6
4	Terengganu FA	6	1	1	4	6	13	−7	4

(A) Advanced to knockout stage

Win Draw Loss

22 August 2012 1	Terengganu FA	2 – 0	Kelantan FA	Kuala Terengganu
20:45	Doe 3'; Ismail 89'			Stadium: Sultan Ismail Nasiruddin Shah Stadium

25 August 2012 2	ATM FA	2 – 1	Terengganu FA	Selayang
20:45	Marlon 31', 74'		Joseph 76'	Stadium: Majlis Perbandaran Selayang Stadium

28 August 2012 3	Kedah FA	2 – 1	Terengganu FA	Alor Setar
20:45	Khyril 8', 49'		Hadi 20'	Stadium: Darul Aman Stadium

1 September 2012 4	Terengganu FA	1 – 1	Kedah FA	Kuala Terengganu
20:45	Doe 24'		Sharbinee 78' (o.g.)	Stadium: Sultan Ismail Nasiruddin Shah Stadium

4 September 2012 5	Terengganu FA	0 – 2	ATM FA	Kuala Terengganu
20:45			Marlon 73'; Bruno 83'	Stadium: Sultan Ismail Nasiruddin Shah Stadium

14 September 2012 6	Kelantan FA	6 – 1	Terengganu FA	Kota Bharu
20:45	Afiq 13'; Norfarhan 29', 47'; Badhri 76', 81'; Indra 86'		Hasmizan 79'	Stadium: Sultan Mohammad IV Stadium

=== AFC Cup ===
==== Group stage ====
Team	Pld	W	D	L	GF	GA	GD	Pts
(Hong Kong) Kitchee	6	3	2	1	9	4	+5	11
(Malaysia) Terengganu	6	3	1	2	10	8	+2	10
(Vietnam) Sông Lam Nghệ An	6	2	1	3	6	9	−3	7
(Singapore) Tampines Rovers	6	1	2	3	3	7	−4	5

	KIT	SNA	TAM	TER
Kitchee	—	2–0	3–1	2–2
Sông Lam Nghệ An	1–0	—	3–0	0–1
Tampines Rovers	0–0	0–0	—	0–1
Terengganu	0–2	6–2	0–2	—

6 March 2012 1	Sông Lam Nghệ An (Vietnam)	0–1	(Malaysia) Terengganu	Vinh
16:00 UTC+07:00		Report	Manaf 51'	Stadium: Vinh Stadium; Attendance: 6,142; Referee: Strebre Delovski (Australia)

20 March 2012 2	Terengganu (Malaysia)	0–2	(Hong Kong) Kitchee	Sultan Ismail Nasiruddin Shah Stadium, Kuala Terengganu
16:45 UTC+08:00		Report	Tarrés 44'; Chu Siu Kei 75'	Attendance: 6,500; Referee: Yu Ming-hsun (Chinese Taipei)

4 April 2012 3	Tampines Rovers (Singapore)	0–1	(Malaysia) Terengganu	Jalan Besar Stadium, Singapore
19:30 UTC+08:00		Report	Joseph 4'	Attendance: 801; Referee: Kim Jong-Hyeok (Korea Republic)

10 April 2012 4	Terengganu (Malaysia)	0–2	(Singapore) Tampines Rovers	Sultan Ismail Nasiruddin Shah Stadium, Kuala Terengganu
16:45 UTC+08:00		Report	Đurić 37', 90'	Attendance: 2,500; Referee: Çarymyrat Gurbanow (Turkmenistan)

25 April 2012 5	Terengganu (Malaysia)	6–2	(Vietnam) Sông Lam Nghệ An	Sultan Ismail Nasiruddin Shah Stadium, Kuala Terengganu
20:45 UTC+08:00	Ashaari 5'; Doe 12', 34', 73'; Hadi 38'; Joseph 87'	Report	Phạm Văn Quyến 29'; Hoàng Văn Bình 84'	Attendance: 2,100; Referee: Pratap Singh (India)

9 May 2012 6	Kitchee (Hong Kong)	2–2	(Malaysia) Terengganu	Tseung Kwan O Sports Ground, Hong Kong
20:00 UTC+08:00	Tarrés 9', 45'	Report	Ashaari 14'; Hadi 69'	Attendance: 1,179; Referee: Chaiya Mahapab (Thailand)

== See also ==
- 2012 Malaysia Super League season
