= 2016 Terengganu FA season =

Terengganu
2016 season
- President: Wan Ahmad Nizam Wan Abdul Hamid
- Manager: Marzuki Sulong (until 22 February); Wan Ahmad Nizam (caretaker) (starting 22 February)
- Head coach: Ahmad Yusof (until 22 February); Mike Mulvey (caretaker) (starting 22 February)
- Stadium: Sultan Mizan Zainal Abidin Stadium
- Liga Super: 12th (relegated)
- Piala FA: Round of 16
- Piala Malaysia: Group stage
- Top goalscorer: League: Issey Nakajima-Farran (7); All: Issey Nakajima-Farran (7)
- Highest home attendance: 15,700 vs Penang (13 February 2016)
- Lowest home attendance: 421 vs Pahang (24 August 2016)
- Average home league attendance: 5,358
Home colours	Away colours

The 2016 season was Terengganu Football Association's 6th season in the Liga Super and the 21st consecutive season in the top-flight of Malaysian football. In addition, they were competing in the domestic tournaments, the Piala FA and the Piala Malaysia.

== Coaching staff ==
Position	Staff
Head coach	(Malaysia) Ahmad Yusof (until 22 February)
Head coach	(England) Mike Mulvey (caretaker)
Assistant coach	(Malaysia) Roshaidi Wahab
Reserve team coach	(Malaysia) Zakari Alias
Goalkeeping coach	(Malaysia) Mohd Zubir Ibrahim
Fitness coach	(Croatia) Miro Petric
Physiotherapist	(Malaysia) Dr. Lee Leong Tiong
Team doctor	(Malaysia) Dr. Lee Leong Tiong

=== Other information ===
Position	Staff
President	(Malaysia) Wan Ahmad Nizam Wan Abdul Hamid
Vice-president	(Malaysia) Marzuki Sulong
Manager	(Malaysia) Marzuki Sulong (until 22 February)
Manager	(Malaysia) Wan Ahmad Nizam (caretaker)
1st Vice-Manager	(Malaysia) Wan Abdul Hamid
2nd Vice-Manager	(Malaysia) Ahmad Awang
Secretary Officer	(Malaysia) Arpin Deraman
Media Officer	(Malaysia) Haslan Hashim
Kitman	(Malaysia) Suhaimi Mohamad

== Players ==
=== Squad information ===
N	P	Nat.	Name	Date of birth	Age	Since	End	Notes
1	GK	(Malaysia)	Amierul Hakimi Awang^{LP}	15 January 1995	21	2015	2016	From Youth system
3	DF	(Malaysia)	Amirizdwan Taj^{LP}	30 March 1986	30	2015	2016	
5	DF	(Cameroon)	Vincent Bikana^{FP}	26 February 1992	24	2012	2016	
6	DF	(Malaysia)	Yong Kuong Yong^{LP}	18 September 1988	28	2015	2016	
7	MF	(Malaysia)	Zairo Anuar^{LP}	18 June 1982	34	2013	2016	
8	MF	(Argentina)	Gustavo Fabián López^{FP}	28 April 1983	33	2014	2016	
9	FW	(Malaysia)	Norshahrul Idlan^{LP}	8 June 1986	30	2015	2016	
10	FW	(Argentina)	Azimuddin ^{FP}	13 March 1982	34	2015	2016	
11	MF	(Canada)	Issey Nakajima-Farran^{FP}	16 May 1984	32	2015	2016	
12	MF	(Malaysia)	Hafizal Mohamad^{LP}	12 January 1993	23	2014	2017	
13	DF	(Malaysia)	Hasmizan Kamarodin^{LP}	24 January 1984	32	2010	2016	
14	MF	(Malaysia)	Mohd Fakhrurazi Musa^{LP}	26 September 1991	25	2011	2017	
15	DF	(Malaysia)	Nasril Izzat Jalil^{LP}	15 April 1991	25	2012	2016	
16	DF	(Malaysia)	Zubir Azmi^{LP}	14 November 1991	25	2010	2017	
17	GK	(Malaysia)	Sharbinee Allawee^{LP}	7 December 1986	30	2013	2016	
18	MF	(Malaysia)	Ahmad Nordin Alias^{LP}	26 October 1985	31	2009	2016	
19	MF	(Malaysia)	Joseph Kalang Tie^{LP}	9 March 1987	29	2015	2016	
20	DF	(Malaysia)	Hairuddin Omar^{LP}	29 September 1979	37	2015	2016	
21	MF	(Malaysia)	Affize Faisal^{LP}	14 March 1989	27	2015	2016	
22	FW	(Malaysia)	Amirul Syahmi^{LP}	9 June 1994	22	2015	2016	From Youth system
24	GK	(Malaysia)	Shamirza Yusoff^{LP}	7 June 1989	27	2011	2016	
25	MF	(Malaysia)	Ismail Faruqi Asha'ri^{LP}	15 October 1986	30	2010	2016	
26	MF	(Malaysia)	Ashari Samsudin^{LP}	7 June 1985	31	2005	2016	
30	MF	(Malaysia)	Sharin Sapien^{LP}	12 April 1994	22	2014	2016	
31	MF	(Malaysia)	Dhiyaulrahman Hasry^{LP}	27 July 1996	20	2015	2017	

Last update: 13 February 2016
Ordered by squad number.
^{LP}Local player; ^{FP}Foreign player; ^{NR}Non-registered player

== Transfers and loans ==
All start dates are pending confirmation.

=== In ===
==== December ====
#	Position:	Player	Transferred from	Fee	Date	Source
19	MF	(Malaysia) Joseph Kalang Tie	(Malaysia) Sarawak	Free	2 December 2015	
6	DF	(Malaysia) Amirizdwan Taj	(Malaysia) Kelantan	Free	2 December 2015	
3	DF	(Malaysia) Yong Kuong Yong	(Malaysia) Penang	Free	2 December 2015	
22	FW	(Malaysia) Amirul Syahmi Asha'ri	Youth system	Free	2 December 2015	
1	GK	(Malaysia) Amierul Hakimi Awang	Youth system	Free	1 January 2016	
21	MF	(Malaysia) Affize Faisal	(Malaysia) ATM	Free	31 January 2016	
20	DF	(Malaysia) Hairuddin Omar	(Malaysia) ATM	Free	31 January 2016	
10	FW	(Malaysia) Juan José Morales	(Argentina) All Boys	Free	7 February 2016	
31	MF	(Malaysia) Dhiyaulrahman Hasry	Youth system	Free	1 January 2016	

==== April ====
#	Position:	Player	Transferred from	Fee	Date	Source
3	DF	(Malaysia) Radhi Yusof	(Malaysia) T-Team	Free	1 July 2016	
—	MF	(Malaysia) Mohd Hasrol Syawal Hamid	(Malaysia) Hanelang	Free	1 July 2016	
28	GK	(Malaysia) Suhaimi Husin	(Malaysia) Hanelang	Free	1 July 2016	
10	FW	(Montenegro) Bogdan Milić	(Spain) CA Osasuna	Free	10 July 2016	
—	MF	(Armenia) Karen Harutyunyan	(Armenia) FC Pyunik	Free	15 July 2016	

=== Out ===
==== December ====
#	Position:	Player	Transferred to	Fee	Date	Source
4	DF	(Malaysia) Abdullah Suleiman	(Malaysia) T-Team	Free	2 December 2015	
6	DF	(Malaysia) Radhi Yusof	(Malaysia) T-Team	Free	2 December 2015	
19	DF	(Malaysia) Azlan Zainal	(Malaysia) Kuala Lumpur	Free	2 December 2015	
23	FW	(Malaysia) Abdul Manaf Mamat	(Malaysia) Kelantan	Free	5 December 2015	
1	GK	(Malaysia) Hafidz Romly	(Malaysia) DRB-Hicom	Free	7 December 2015	
21	DF	(Malaysia) Helmi Remeli	(Malaysia) Kuala Lumpur	Free	31 December 2015	
17	MF	(Malaysia) Khairul Ramadhan	(Malaysia) PKNS	Free	6 January 2016	

==== April ====
#	Position:	Player	Transferred to	Fee	Date	Source
—	DF	(Malaysia) Amirizdwan Taj	Unattached		31 May 2016	
—	FW	(Malaysia) Juan José Morales	Unattached		10 July 2016	

== Pre-season ==
19 January 2016 Friendly	UiTM	0–3	Terengganu	Shah Alam
16:45 UTC+08:00		Report	Joseph; Gustavo; Issey	Stadium: National Sports Complex

21 January 2016 Friendly	Kuala Lumpur	2–1	Terengganu	Cyberjaya
16:45 UTC+08:00	Anselmo Casagrande 50', 63'	Report	Joseph 7'	Stadium: Mini MMU Stadium

23 January 2016 Friendly	PDRM	0–2	Terengganu	Kuala Lumpur
16:45 UTC+08:00			Dembélé 16'; Joseph 35'	Stadium: Pulapol Field

30 January 2016 Friendly	Terengganu	2–2	Kuantan	Kuala Terengganu
21:00 UTC+08:00	Joseph 23'; Fakhrurazi 86'	Report		Stadium: Sultan Ismail Nasiruddin Shah Stadium

== Competitions ==
=== Liga Super ===
==== League table ====
Pos	Team	Pld	W	D	L	GF	GA	GD	Pts	Qualification or relegation
8	Sarawak	22	6	6	10	32	40	−8	24	
9	Pahang	22	5	6	11	22	41	−19	24 (Note: Pahang has been awarded 3 points free from the Football Association of Malaysia (FAM) after offenses committed by the Football Association of Kedah (Kedah FA) putting the suspended player during the match against Pahang on August 3, 2016.)	
10	Penang	22	5	7	10	32	37	−5	22	
11	PDRM (R)	22	5	6	11	21	32	−11	21	Relegation to Liga Premier
12	Terengganu (R)	22	5	4	13	21	44	−23	19	Relegation to Liga Premier

Source: SPMB Football Association of Malaysia, Football Malaysia LLP
Rules for classification: 1) Points; 2) Goal difference; 3) Number of goals scored; 3) Number of goals against.
(R) Relegated

==== Results summary ====
Overall								Home						Away					
Pld	W	D	L	GF	GA	GD	Pts	W	D	L	GF	GA	GD	W	D	L	GF	GA	GD
22	5	4	13	21	44	−23	19	4	1	6	14	25	−11	1	3	7	7	19	−12

Last updated: 22 October 2016.
Source: Competitions

==== Results by round ====
Round	1	2	3	4	5	6	7	8	9	10	11	12	13	14	15	16	17	18	19	20	21	22
Ground	H	A	H	A	H	H	A	H	A	H	A	H	A	H	A	H	A	A	H	A	H	A
Result	W	L	L	W	W	L	L	L	L	W	D	W	L	L	L	L	L	D	D	L	L	L
Position	3	6	8	5	4	5	8	8	9	8	8	6	7	7	9	10	11	11	10	11	12	12

Updated to match(es) played on 22 October 2016. Source: Competitions
A = Away; H = Home; W = Win; D = Draw; L = Loss

=== Matches ===
Win Draw Loss

13 February 2016 1	Terengganu	1−0	Penang	Kuala Nerus
21:00	Gustavo 25'; Issey (yellow card) 87'		Azrul (yellow card) 59'	Stadium: Sultan Mizan Zainal Abidin Stadium; Attendance: 15,700; Referee: Mohd Nafeez Abdul Wahab

16 February 2016 2	Kedah	1−0	Terengganu	Alor Setar
21:00	Kahê 43'			Stadium: Darul Aman Stadium; Attendance: 17,000; Referee: Fairuzi Mat Desa

27 February 2016 3	Terengganu	0−2	Johor Darul Ta'zim	Kuala Nerus
21:00			S. Chanturu 28'; Díaz 33'; S. Kunalan (yellow card) 65'	Stadium: Sultan Mizan Zainal Abidin Stadium; Attendance: 11,300; Referee: Syed Azhar Syed Kamar

1 March 2016 4	Pahang	1−2	Terengganu	Kuantan
21:00	Potokar (yellow card) 7'; Salomon 81'		Amirul Syahmi 14', 24'; Sharbinee (yellow card) 61'; Joseph (yellow card) 70'; Yong (yellow card) 90+2'	Stadium: Darul Makmur Stadium; Attendance: 6,023; Referee: Zulkifli Ahmad

11 March 2016 5	Terengganu	3−1	Selangor	Kuala Nerus
21:00	Issey 45+1', 87'; Sharin (yellow card) 51'; Morales 80'		R. Gopinathan 46'	Stadium: Sultan Mizan Zainal Abidin Stadium; Attendance: 7,200; Referee: Mohd Zohri Tajuddin

4 April 2016 6	Terengganu	1−4	FELDA United	Kuala Terengganu
21:00	Issey (yellow card) 22'; Joseph 25', (yellow card) 84'; Nordin (yellow card) 86'; Bikana (yellow card) 88'		Gilberto (yellow card) 22'; D. Christie 27'; Hadin (yellow card) 35'; Yong 67' (o.g.); Zah Rahan 71'; Doe 78'; Turaev (yellow card) 83'; Ridzuan (yellow card) 87'	Stadium: Sultan Ismail Nasiruddin Shah Stadium; Attendance: 7,250; Referee: Mohd Zohri Tajuddin

10 April 2016 7	PDRM	3−1	Terengganu	Shah Alam
21:00	Safuwan 6'; Ali Ashfaq 72'; Saiful 89'		Hasmizan (yellow card) 45'; Joseph 30', (red card) 77'	Stadium: Shah Alam Stadium; Attendance: 2,300; Referee: Saiful Mohd Rodzali

19 April 2016 8	Terengganu	2−3	Perak	Kuala Terengganu
21:00	Issey 26', 86'; Hairuddin Omar (yellow card) 51'; Hasmizan (yellow card) 64'; Amierul Hakimi (yellow card) 88'		Fazrul Hazli Kadri 22'; Elias Oliveira 57', 63'; Syazwan Roslan (yellow card) 28'	Stadium: Sultan Ismail Nasiruddin Shah Stadium; Attendance: 4,300; Referee: Syed Azhar Syed Kamar

23 April 2016 9	Kelantan	3−0	Terengganu	Kota Bharu
21:00	Wan Zack Haikal 14', 63'; Indra Putra Mahayuddin (yellow card) 41'; Fakhrul Zaman 90'			Stadium: Sultan Mohammad IV Stadium; Attendance: 3,315; Referee: S. Sittharajan

4 May 2016 10	Terengganu	3−2	Sarawak	Kuala Terengganu
21:00	Joseph 13', (yellow card) 37'; Nordin 51'; Ashaari 70'		Ndumba Makeche 17'; Juninho 45'	Stadium: Sultan Ismail Nasiruddin Shah Stadium; Attendance: 900; Referee: Fitri Maskon

18 May 2016 11	T-Team	0−0	Terengganu	Kuala Terengganu
21:00	Maiga (yellow card) 51'		Issey (yellow card) 11'; Zubir (yellow card) 89'	Stadium: Sultan Ismail Nasiruddin Shah Stadium; Attendance: 4,891; Referee: Zamzaidi Katimin

21 May 2016 12	Terengganu	2−1	T-Team	Kuala Nerus
21:00	Norshahrul 5'; Hasmizan (yellow card) 34'; Joseph 90'; Sharbinee (yellow card) 90'		Marzuki (yellow card) 40'; Asrol 64'	Stadium: Sultan Mizan Zainal Abidin Stadium; Attendance: 2,300; Referee: Saiful Mohd Rodzali

15 July 2016 14	Terengganu	1−6	Kelantan	Kuala Nerus
21:00	Issey Nakajima-Farran 7'	Report	Blazhe Ilijoski 3', 63', 77', 86'; Wander Luiz Bitencourt Junior 44'; Wan Zack Haikal 59'	Stadium: Sultan Mizan Zainal Abidin Stadium; Attendance: 7,500; Referee: Mohd Zohri Tajuddin

23 July 2016 15	Perak	2−0	Terengganu	Ipoh
21:00				Stadium: Perak Stadium; Attendance: 3,117; Referee: Zulkifli Ahmad

27 July 2016 16	Terengganu	0−2	PDRM	Kuala Nerus
21:00				Stadium: Sultan Mizan Zainal Abidin Stadium; Attendance: 1,300; Referee: Zamzaidi Katimin

3 August 2016 17	Sarawak	2−1	Terengganu	Kuching
21:00		Report	Vincent Bikana 21'	Stadium: Sarawak State Stadium; Attendance: 955; Referee: Syed Azhar Syed Kamar

6 August 2016 17	FELDA United	2−2	Terengganu	Bandar Pusat Jengka
21:00		Report	Issey Nakajima-Farran 8'; Ashari Samsudin 61'	Stadium: Tun Abdul Razak Stadium; Attendance: 3,544; Referee: Mohd Amirul Izwan Yaacob

16 August 2016 18	Selangor	1−1	Terengganu	Shah Alam
21:00		Report	Ashari Samsudin 64'	Stadium: Shah Alam Stadium; Attendance: 2,379; Referee: Mohd Nafeez Abdul Wahab

24 August 2016 19	Terengganu	1−1	Pahang	Kuala Nerus
21:00	Issey Nakajima-Farran 88' (pen.)	Report		Stadium: Sultan Mizan Zainal Abidin Stadium; Attendance: 421; Referee: Zamzaidi Katimin

9 September 2016 20	Johor Darul Ta'zim	3−0	Terengganu	Larkin
21:00				Stadium: Tan Sri Dato Haji Hassan Yunos Stadium

24 September 2016 21	Terengganu	0−3	Kedah	Kuala Nerus
21:00				Stadium: Sultan Mizan Zainal Abidin Stadium; Attendance: 768; Referee: Syed Azhar Syed Kamar

22 October 2016 22	Penang	1−0	Terengganu	George Town
21:00				Stadium: City Stadium

Kickoff times are in +08:00 GMT.

=== Piala FA ===
Win Draw Loss

19 February 2016 Second round	PKNS	3–1	Terengganu	Malacca City
21:00	Jadue 47'; P. Gunalan (yellow card) 64'; Soto 73'; Cobelli 90+4' (pen.)		Dhiyaulrahman (yellow card) 57'; Fakhrurazi 61'; Bikana (yellow card) 69'; Sharbinee (yellow card) 90+3'	Stadium: Hang Jebat Stadium; Attendance: 795; Referee: Khairulazuan Kidam

=== Piala Malaysia ===
==== Group stage ====
Pos	Team	Pld	W	D	L	GF	GA	GD	Pts	Qualification	FEL	NSE	MEL	TRG
1	(Kuala Lumpur) FELDA United	6	4	0	2	9	5	+4	12	Advance to Quarter-finals	—	3–1	2–1	0–1
2	Negeri Sembilan	6	4	0	2	9	8	+1	12	Advance to Quarter-finals	2–0	—	3–2	1–0
3	Malacca United	6	3	0	3	9	7	+2	9		0–1	2–0	—	2–1
4	Terengganu	6	1	0	5	3	10	−7	3		0–3	1–2	0–2	—

Updated to match(es) played on 19 August 2016. Source: FAM FMLLP

Win Draw Loss

12 July 2016	Melaka United	2–1	Terengganu	Malacca City
21:00 UTC+8	Spasojević 54' (pen.); Surendran 58'	Report	Milić 74'	Stadium: Hang Jebat Stadium; Attendance: 9,000; Referee: Mohd Nafeez Abdul Wahab

20 July 2016	FELDA United	0–1	Terengganu	Jengka
21:00 UTC+8		Report	Norshahrul 49'	Stadium: Tun Abdul Razak Stadium; Attendance: 1,493; Referee: Razlan Jeffri Ali

30 July 2016	Terengganu	1–2	Negeri Sembilan	Kuala Nerus
21:00 UTC+8	Milić 23'	Report	Jerković 71' (pen.); Afiq 78'	Stadium: Sultan Mizan Zainal Abidin Stadium; Attendance: 2,200; Referee: Zulkifli Ahmad

9 August 2016	Negeri Sembilan	1–0	Terengganu	Seremban
21:00 UTC+8	Jerković 18'	Report		Stadium: Tuanku Abdul Rahman Stadium; Attendance: 2,717; Referee: Mohd Nafeez Abdul Wahab

12 August 2016	Terengganu	0–3	FELDA United	Kuala Nerus
21:00 UTC+8		Report	Norfazly 20'; Forkey Doe 45'; Zah Rahan 78'	Stadium: Sultan Mizan Zainal Abidin Stadium; Attendance: 1,751; Referee: Suresh Jayaraman

19 August 2016	Terengganu	0–2	Melaka United	Kuala Nerus
21:00 UTC+8		Report	Saiful 61'; Ezrie 78'	Stadium: Sultan Mizan Zainal Abidin Stadium; Attendance: 350; Referee: Zulkifli Ahmad

== Statistics ==
=== Squad statistics ===
No.	Pos	Nat	Player	Total		Liga Super		Piala FA		Piala Malaysia	
No.	Pos	Nat	Player	Apps	Goals	Apps	Goals	Apps	Goals	Apps	Goals
Goalkeepers
1	GK	(Malaysia) MAS	Amierul Hakimi Awang	3	0	3	0	0	0	0	0
17	GK	(Malaysia) MAS	Sharbinee Allawee	20	0	19	0	1	0	0	0
24	GK	(Malaysia) MAS	Shamirza Yusoff	0	0	0	0	0	0	0	0
Defenders
3	DF	(Malaysia) MAS	Radhi Yusof	2	0	2	0	0	0	0	0
5	DF	(Cameroon) CMR	Vincent Bikana	21	1	19+1	1	1	0	0	0
6	DF	(Malaysia) MAS	Yong Kuong Yong	16	0	13+2	0	1	0	0	0
12	DF	(Malaysia) MAS	Hafizal Mohamad	12	0	10+2	0	0	0	0	0
13	DF	(Malaysia) MAS	Hasmizan Kamarodin	19	0	19	0	0	0	0	0
16	DF	(Malaysia) MAS	Zubir Azmi	10	0	9	0	0+1	0	0	0
33	DF	(Malaysia) MAS	Naim Asraff Nordin	10	0	9	0	0+1	0	0	0
36	DF	(Malaysia) MAS	Che Mohd Arif	1	0	0+1	0	0	0	0	0
Midfielders
7	MF	(Malaysia) MAS	Zairo Anuar	2	0	0+1	0	1	0	0	0
14	MF	(Malaysia) MAS	Fakhrurazi Musa	17	1	10+6	0	1	1	0	0
15	MF	(Malaysia) MAS	Nasril Izzat	7	0	3+4	0	0	0	0	0
18	MF	(Malaysia) MAS	Nordin Alias	14	1	13+1	1	0	0	0	0
19	MF	(Malaysia) MAS	Joseph Kalang Tie	20	4	14+5	4	0+1	0	0	0
21	MF	(Malaysia) MAS	Affize Faisal	12	0	5+6	0	1	0	0	0
25	MF	(Malaysia) MAS	Ismail Faruqi	6	0	3+3	0	0	0	0	0
30	MF	(Malaysia) MAS	Sharin Sapien	19	0	18	0	0+1	0	0	0
31	MF	(Malaysia) MAS	Dhiyaulrahman Hasry	13	0	11+1	0	1	0	0	0
34	MF	(Malaysia) MAS	Azrean Aziz	1	0	0+1	0	0	0	0	0
35	MF	(Malaysia) MAS	Haidhir Suhaini	1	0	0+1	0	0	0	0	0
Forwards
8	FW	(Argentina) ARG	Gustavo López	12	1	11	1	1	0	0	0
9	FW	(Malaysia) MAS	Norshahrul Idlan	18	2	15+2	1	1	0	0	1
10	FW	(Montenegro) MNE	Bogdan Milić	9	2	6+3	0	0	0	0	2
11	FW	(Canada) CAN	Issey Nakajima-Farran	18	7	16+2	7	0	0	0	0
20	FW	(Malaysia) MAS	Hairuddin Omar	8	0	3+4	0	1	0	0	0
22	FW	(Malaysia) MAS	Amirul Syahmi	7	2	4+3	2	0	0	0	0
26	FW	(Malaysia) MAS	Ashari Samsudin	16	3	11+5	3	0	0	0	0
–	FW	(Argentina) ARG	Juan Morales	8	1	0+7	1	1	0	0	0

Last updated: 26 May 2016
Source: Competitions

=== Disciplinary record ===
N	P	Nat.	Name	Liga Super			Piala FA			Piala Malaysia			Total			Notes
N	P	Nat.	Name	Yellow card	Second yellow card	Red card	Yellow card	Second yellow card	Red card	Yellow card	Second yellow card	Red card	Yellow card	Second yellow card	Red card	Notes
5	DF	(Cameroon)	Vincent Bikana	4		1	1						5		1	
19	MF	(Malaysia)	Joseph Kalang	4		1							4		1	
11	FW	(Canada)	Issey Nakajima	4									4			
13	MF	(Malaysia)	Hasmizan	3									3			
17	GK	(Malaysia)	Sharbinee Allawee	2			1						3			
12	DF	(Malaysia)	Hafizal Mohamad	2									2			
14	DF	(Malaysia)	Fakhrurazi Musa	2									2			
30	MF	(Malaysia)	Sharin Sapien	2									2			
1	GK	(Malaysia)	Amierul Hakimi	1									1			
6	MF	(Malaysia)	Yong Kuong	1									1			
10	FW	(Montenegro)	Bogdan Milić	1									1			
16	DF	(Malaysia)	Zubir Azmi	1									1			
18	MF	(Malaysia)	Nordin Alias	1									1			
20	FW	(Malaysia)	Hairuddin Omar	1									1			
26	FW	(Malaysia)	Ashari Samsudin	1									1			
31	MF	(Malaysia)	Dhiyaulrahman Hasry				1						1			
34	MF	(Malaysia)	Azrean Aziz	1									1			

Last updated: 26 May 2016
Source: Competitive matches
Ordered by (red card) , (second yellow card) and (yellow card)
(yellow card) = Number of bookings; (second yellow card) = Number of sending offs after a second yellow card; (red card) = Number of sending offs by a direct red card.

== See also ==
- 2016 Liga Super season
