= Zubir Azmi =

Malaysian footballer

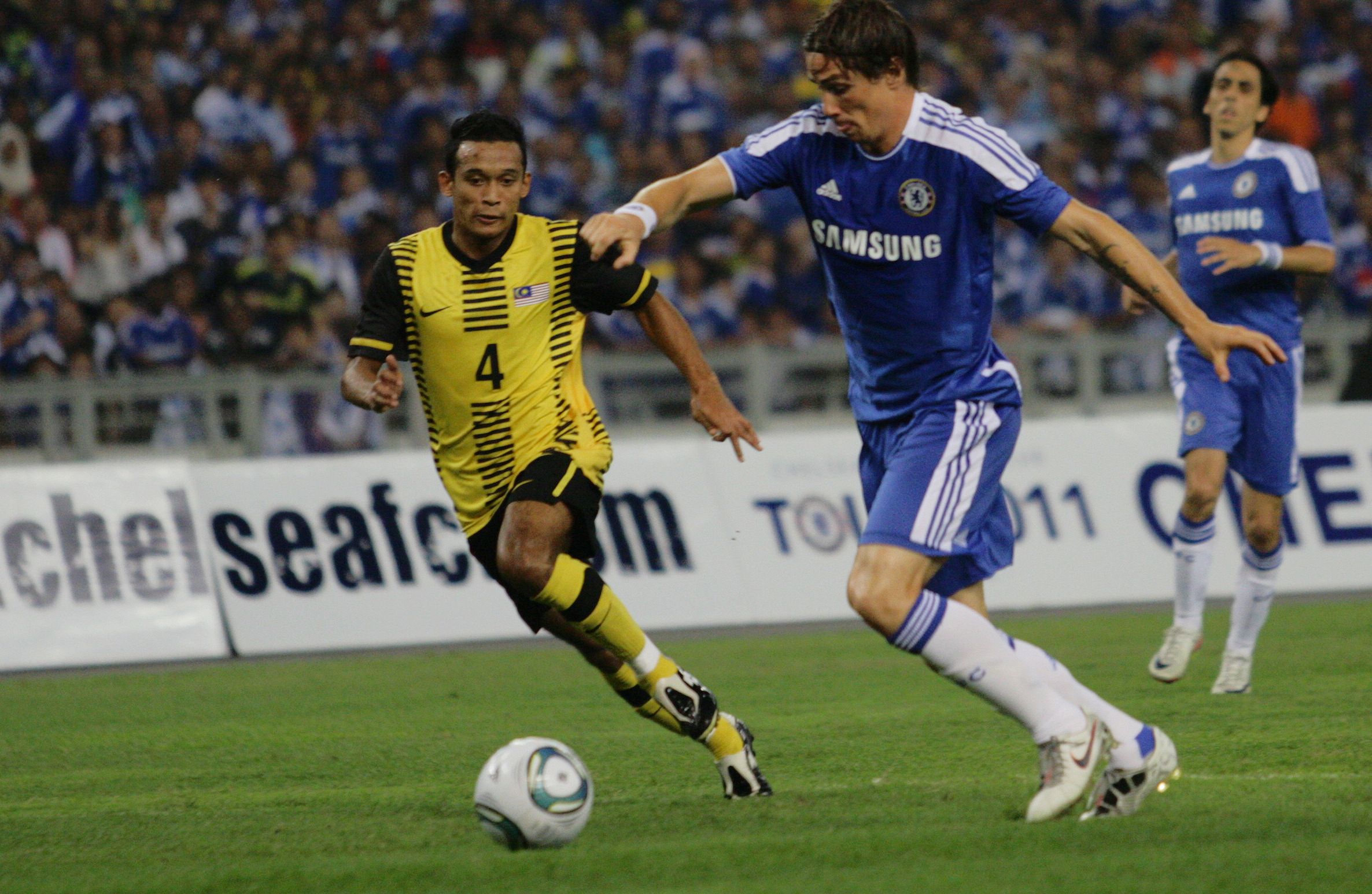
- Zubir (left) chasing Fernando Torres

Personal information
- Full name: Muhammad Zubir bin Mohd Azmi
- Date of birth: 14 November 1991 (age 34)
- Place of birth: Jerteh, Terengganu, Malaysia
- Height: 1.71 m (5 ft 7 in)
- Position: Left-back

Youth career
- 2006–2010: Terengganu U-19

Senior career*
Years	Team	Apps	(Gls)
2010–2016	Terengganu	94	(0)
2017–2019	Pahang	19	(0)
2020	Sabah	0	(0)
2021–2022	Kelantan	6	(0)

International career^{‡}
2010–2015	Malaysia U-23	10	(0)
2011–2017	Malaysia	27	(0)
Medal record
Men's football
Representing Malaysia
AFF Championship
Runner-up	2014
Malaysia U23
Sea Games
First place	2011
- * Club domestic league appearances and goals as of August 11, 2021 ‡ National team caps and goals as of January 25, 2017

Muhammad Zubir bin Mohd Azmi (born 14 November 1991) is a Malaysian football.

== Club career ==
=== Pahang ===
In January 2017, Zubir signed a contract with Malaysia Super League side Pahang from Terengganu for an undisclosed fee.

== International career ==
Zubir made his international debut for the Malaysia national team, as a substitute, in a friendly match with Australia on 7 October 2011. Malaysia lost this match heavily 5–0.

In 2012, Zubir was called up for the national team for AFF Suzuki Cup 2012 and Malaysia only get to semi final lost 3–1 to Thailand on aggregate. In 2014, Zubir get another call up by Malaysian coach Dollah Salleh for 2014 AFF Suzuki Cup. Malaysia through to the final but lost 4–3 to Thailand on the aggregate. Only two Terengganu player at the Malaysian AFF Cup 2014 squad, Zubir and Abdul Manaf Mamat.

== Career statistics ==
=== Club ===
As of 21 July 2018.

Appearances and goals by club, season and competition
Club	Season	League			Cup		League Cup		Continental		Total	
Club	Season	Division	Apps	Goals	Apps	Goals	Apps	Goals	Apps	Goals	Apps	Goals
Terengganu	2011	Malaysia Super League	17	0	0	0	0	0	–		0	0
Terengganu	2012	Malaysia Super League	10	0	0	0	0	0	–		0	0
Terengganu	2013	Malaysia Super League	17	0	5	0	2	0	–		24	0
Terengganu	2014	Malaysia Super League	21	0	2	0	8	0	–		31	0
Terengganu	2015	Malaysia Super League	20	0	4	0	6	0	–		30	0
Terengganu	2016	Malaysia Super League	9	0	1	0	0	0	–		10	0
Terengganu	Total		94	0	0	0	0	0	0	0	0	0
Pahang	2017	Malaysia Super League	6	0	0	0	3	0	–		9	0
Pahang	2018	Malaysia Super League	11	0	1	0	0	0	–		7	0
Pahang	Total		17	0	1	0	3	0	0	0	21	0
Career total			107	0	0	0	0	0	0	0	0	0

=== International ===
As of 1 July 2018

Malaysia
Year	Apps	Goals
2011	1	0
2012	9	0
2013	0	0
2014	10	0
2015	7	0
Total	27	0

== Honours ==
- Southeast Asian Games: 2011
- AFF Suzuki Cup runner-up: 2014
- Terengganu
  - Recipient of the Meritorious Service Medal (PJK) (2012)
