= Muslim Ahmad =

Malaysian footballer (born 1989)

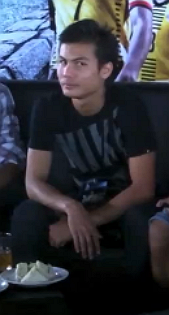
- Muslim Ahmad on 2 October 2011

Personal information
- Full name: Mohamad Muslim bin Ahmad
- Date of birth: 25 April 1989 (age 37)
- Place of birth: Kuala Terengganu, Malaysia
- Height: 1.82 m (5 ft 11 1/2 in)
- Position: Centre-back

Youth career
- 2006–2007: Terengganu

Senior career*
Years	Team	Apps	(Gls)
2007–2009	Harimau Muda	24	(0)
2009–2011	Harimau Muda A	20	(0)
2011–2012	Terengganu	36	(2)
2013–2014	Johor Darul Ta'zim	5	(0)
2014–2015	PDRM	36	(3)
2016–2017	Kelantan	17	(0)
2017–2023	Sri Pahang	65	(3)

International career^{‡}
2008–2011	Malaysia U-21	19	(1)
2009–2013	Malaysia U-23	20	(0)
2009–2015	Malaysia	28	(0)
Medal record
Men's football
Representing Malaysia
ASEAN Championship
Winner	2010 AFF Championship
Runner-up	2014 AFF Championship
Malaysia U23
SEA Games
First place	2011 Jakarta	Football
First place	2009 Vientiane	Football
- * Club domestic league appearances and goals as of 9 May 2021 ‡ National team caps and goals as of 16 June 2015

Mohamad Muslim bin Ahmad (born 25 April 1989) is a Malaysian professional footballer who plays as a centre-back for Malaysia Super League.

== Club career ==
=== Terengganu ===
In 2011, Muslim Ahmad left Harimau Muda A to return to his home team Terengganu as the he prepared to combine the chase for domestic honours with an international career. Having established himself with the national team, the 22-year-old Muslim felt the time was right to embark on a new path in his career. Muslim, who had two Sea Games gold medals and an AFF Cup winners' medal in his collection, now aimed to help FA Cup winners Terengganu advance past the first round of the AFC Cup, win the Super League and Malaysia Cup when the new season started.

Muslim made his first league debut against Perak. The match ended with Terengganu suffer a narrow defeat 1–0. Muslim plays his first AFC Cup match against Vietnamese side, Sông Lam Nghệ An. Terengganu marks the first win on the AFC Cup debut with 1–0 wins. On 22 August 2012, Muslim made his Malaysia Cup debut against Kelantan. Muslim help Terengganu to open their campaign with a shocking victory 2–0.

On 19 September 2012, Muslim left Terengganu after being released by the club.

=== Johor Darul Ta'zim ===
On 4 November 2012, Malaysia Super League club, Johor Darul Ta'zim confirmed that Muslim would join the club. He made his debut against Pelita Bandung Raya in a friendly match. Muslim scored in his debut after being assisted by teammate Simone Del Nero. He plays another friendly game against Woodlands Wellington with 5–1 win.

=== PDRM ===
Muslim signed with PDRM for the 2015 season but was released at the end of the league campaign.

=== Kelantan ===
On 5 December 2015, Muslim was revealed as Kelantan's new player for 2016 season.

=== Sri Pahang ===
On 15 January 2017, Muslim signed a contract with Sri Pahang. At Sri Pahang Muslim serves as the club's captain.

== International career ==
Muslim began his career with playing for Harimau Muda A. He is the captain of Harimau Muda A. Muslim Ahmad is a Malaysian national football player. He has played for the Malaysia national football team, and in summer 2009 he played twice against Manchester United in their pre season tour of the Far East.

Muslim and 25 other players, who play for Harimau Muda A, were chosen to participate in a training camp in Slovakia. During his time in the training camp, Muslim and his teammate, Gary Steven Robbat were given a trial from the Slovak team ViOn Zlaté Moravce on 30 March. ViOn Zlaté Moravce coach Ľubomír Moravčík promised Muslim and Gary a professional contract for the next 2010–11 season. Later, ViOn Zlaté Moravce lost interest in Muslim and Gary due to internal problems in the club.

In November 2010, Muslim was called up to the Malaysia national squad by coach K. Rajagopal for the 2010 AFF Suzuki Cup. Malaysia won the 2010 AFF Suzuki Cup title for the first time in their history.

Muslim was only 19 when made his senior international debut in 2009. His first tournament action was at 2009 Sea Games. Muslim helps Malaysia to win their fifth Sea Games gold medal. Muslim also played at 2010 Asia Games. Muslim led Malaysia to qualify for the second round of the 2010 Asia Games as one of the best four third-placed teams after a lapse of 32 years. Muslim was called by Malaysia coach, K. Rajagopal to play at 2010 AFF Suzuki Cup. Malaysia won the 2010 AFF Suzuki Cup title for the first time in their history under the management of Rajagopal.

== Career statistics ==
=== Club ===
As of 21 July 2018

Appearances and goals by club, season and competition
Club	Season	League			Cup		League Cup		Continental		Other		Total	
Club	Season	Division	Apps	Goals	Apps	Goals	Apps	Goals	Apps	Goals	Apps	Goals	Apps	Goals
Terengganu	2012	Malaysia Super League	21	2	3	0	6	0	6	0	–	–	36	2
Terengganu	Total		21	2	3	0	6	0	6	0	–	–	36	2
Johor Darul Ta'zim	2013	Malaysia Super League	0	0	0	0	0	0	0	0	2	1	2	1
Johor Darul Ta'zim	Total		0	0	0	0	0	0	0	0	2	1	2	1
Kelantan	2016	Malaysia Super League	17	0	3	0	2	0	0	0	0	0	22	0
Kelantan	Total		17	0	3	0	2	0	0	0	0	0	22	0
Pahang	2017	Malaysia Super League	8	0	4	0	1	0	—		—		13	0
Pahang	2018	Malaysia Super League	19	1	7	0	8	1	—		—		34	2
Pahang	2019	Malaysia Super League	0	0	0	0	0	0	—		—		0	0
Pahang	2020	Malaysia Super League	0	0	0	0	0	0	—		—		0	0
Pahang	2021	Malaysia Super League	0	0	0	0	0	0	—		—		0	0
Pahang	Total		26	1	11	0	1	0	0	0	0	0	38	1
Career total			0	0	0	0	0	0	0	0	0	0	0	0

=== International ===
As of 16 June 2015.

National team	Year	Apps	Goals
Malaysia	2009	4	0
Malaysia	2010	8	0
Malaysia	2011	4	0
Malaysia	2012	1	0
Malaysia	2013	0	0
Malaysia	2014	8	0
Malaysia	2015	4	0
Total		28	0

=== Malaysia XI ===
#	Date	Location	Head coach	Opponent	Result	Goals
1	18 July 2009	National Stadium, Bukit Jalil	K. Rajagopal	Manchester United	2–3 (L)	
2	20 July 2009	National Stadium, Bukit Jalil	K. Rajagopal	Manchester United	0–2 (L)	
3	13 July 2011	National Stadium, Bukit Jalil	K. Rajagopal	Arsenal	0–4 (L)	
4	21 July 2011	National Stadium, Bukit Jalil	Ong Kim Swee	Chelsea	0–1 (L)	

== Honours ==
=== International ===
- 2009 SEA Games: (gold)
- 2010 AFF Championship: Winner
- 2011 SEA Games: (gold)
- 2014 AFF Championship: Runner-up

=== Club ===
Harimau Muda

- Malaysia Premier League: 2009

PDRM

- Malaysia Premier League: 2014

Sri Pahang

- Malaysia FA Cup: 2018

=== Individual ===
FAM Football Awards

- Best Young Players: 2009
