= 2006 AFF U-20 Youth Championship =

Kejohanan Remaja B-20 AFF 2006

Tournament details
- Host country: Malaysia
- City: Pahang
- Dates: 13–17 September
- Teams: 4 (from 1 confederation)
- Venue: 1 (in 1 host city)

Final positions
- Champions: Australia (1st title)
- Runners-up: Malaysia
- Third place: Thailand
- Fourth place: Vietnam

Tournament statistics
- Matches played: 6
- Goals scored: 18 (3 per match)

The 2006 AFF U-20 Youth Championship was held in Kuantan, Malaysia in September 2006. Only four nations took part, three from the ASEAN region and associate member Australia. The tournament was played in a round-robin group with the winner of the group crowned champions.

== Teams ==
- Australia
- Malaysia
- Thailand
- Vietnam

== Tournament ==
All times are Malaysia Standard Time (MST) – UTC+8

| Team | Pld | W | D | L | GF | GA | GD | Pts |
|---|---|---|---|---|---|---|---|---|
| Australia | 3 | 3 | 0 | 0 | 8 | 0 | +8 | 9 |
| Malaysia | 3 | 1 | 1 | 1 | 4 | 4 | 0 | 4 |
| Thailand | 3 | 1 | 0 | 2 | 3 | 6 | −3 | 3 |
| Vietnam | 3 | 0 | 1 | 2 | 3 | 8 | −5 | 1 |

13 September 2006
18:30

| Thailand | 0–3 | Australia |
|---|---|---|
| | | Djite 1'; Downey 79'; Burns 90+2' |

Darul Makmur Stadium

13 September 2006
20:45

| Malaysia | 2–2 | Vietnam |
|---|---|---|
| Manaf 66'; Fakri 79' | Report | Hiệp 17'; Tình 48' |

Darul Makmur Stadium

15 September 2006
18:30

| Australia | 4–0 | Vietnam |
|---|---|---|
| Berger 10'; Hearfield 48'; Burns 53'; Elrich 76' |

Darul Makmur Stadium

15 September 2006
20:45

| Thailand | 1–2 | Malaysia |
|---|---|---|
| Phanuwat 34' | Report | Manaf 45' 55' |

Darul Makmur Stadium

17 September 2006
18:30

| Vietnam | 1–2 | Thailand |
|---|---|---|
| Khải 60' | | Suttinun 3', 58' |

Darul Makmur Stadium

17 September 2006
20:45

| Malaysia | 0–1 | Australia |
|---|---|---|
| | | Vidošić 29' |

Darul Makmur Stadium

== Winner ==
2006 AFF U-20 Youth Championship

Australia
First title

== Goalscorers ==
3 goals

- (Malaysia) Abdul Manaf Mamat

2 goals

- (Australia) Nathan Burns
- (Thailand) Suttinun Phukhom

1 goal

- (Australia) Dario Vidosic
- (Australia) Bruce Djite
- (Australia) James Downey
- (Australia) Evan Berger
- (Australia) Troy Hearfield
- (Australia) Tarek Elrich
- (Malaysia) Ahmad Fakri Saarani
- (Vietnam) Nguyễn Văn Khải
- (Vietnam) Nguyễn Quang Tình
- (Vietnam) Huỳnh Phúc Hiệp
