= Joseph Kalang Tie =

Malaysian former footballer

Personal information
- Date of birth: 9 March 1987 (age 39)
- Place of birth: Long Ikang, Marudi, Malaysia
- Height: 1.68 m (5 ft 6 in)
- Position: Midfielder

Team information
- Current team: Kuching City FC II (U20 coach)

Youth career
- 2003–2006: Sarawak

Senior career*
Years	Team	Apps	(Gls)
2006–2007	Sarawak		
2008–2011	Terengganu		
2012–2015	Sarawak		
2016	Terengganu	19	(4)
2017	Pahang	13	(2)
2018	Selangor	9	(0)
2019–2023	Kuching City	66	(22)

International career^{‡}
2011–2016	Malaysia	7	(2)

Managerial career
- 2023–: Kuching City FC II (U20 coach)
- * Club domestic league appearances and goals as of 22 December 2022 ‡ National team caps and goals as of 21 December 2017

Joseph Kalang Tie (born 9 March 1987) is a Malaysian former footballer who currently serves as youth coach for Kuching City FC II team. He formerly played for the Malaysia national team.

Mainly as an attacking midfielder and a winger, he has also been deployed in central midfield. Joseph is known for his technical ability, creativity, pace, and ability to read the game.

== Personal life ==
Joseph was born in Long Ikang, a small village located in Marudi, Sarawak. He is of mixed parentage of Malaysian Chinese and Kenyah, an indigenous people of Borneo. He is married to Rebekah Livan Balan since 16 November 2014. The couple has two children, Kendrick Lian and Kylian Laing.

Joseph has stated that Azizul Kamaluddin, the former Pahang and Malaysia striker, was his role model in football while he was growing up.

== Career ==
=== Sarawak ===
Joseph Kalang Tie is a footballer who plays for Sarawak FA - his home state and the team he started his career with. Joseph is well known for his close control of the ball and good range of passing. He made his first appearance during the 2006/07 season, scoring two league goals and one goal in Malaysia Cup group match against PDRM. At age 21 (Malaysia Super League 2007-08), Joseph became the youngest player to captain Sarawak.

In October 2008, Joseph Kalang Tie was one of three players selected to attend a two-month training stint with English League One side Hartlepool United.

In Malaysia FA Cup 2009, Joseph scored his first ever senior team hattrick in 6-1 trashing over ATM FA.

He left Sarawak before the start of the 2009 Malaysia Cup seasons despite being the top scorer for the team in all competitions for 2009 seasons.

=== Terengganu ===
He later joined Terengganu for the 2010 season. and is still regarded highly by their fans despite leaving at the end of the 2012 season. He was affectionately given the nickname "Messi Terengganu" because of his ability on the ball. In 2011, Joseph won his first silverware with Terengganu after beating Kelantan 2–1 in 2011 Malaysia FA Cup.

=== Return to Sarawak ===
After 3 years with Terengganu, Joseph returned to Sarawak FA on 30 September 2012, having ended his contract with Terengganu 8 days earlier. On 7 January, Joseph made his debut return for Sarawak in the 2–1 league opening game win against Perlis at Kangar Stadium.

=== Return to Terengganu ===
On 2 December 2015, Joseph signs for Terengganu FA for his second spell to the club.

=== Pahang ===
On 15 December 2016, Joseph signed for another Super League club Pahang, on a one-year contract. He was handed the number 17 jersey ahead of the 2017 season. He made his official debut for the club on 21 January 2017 during the Super League season opener against Perak, which the match ended with a 1–1 draw.

On 18 February 2017, Joseph scored his first goal for the club in the 66th minute as part of a 6–1 home victory against Penang in the league matches.

=== Selangor ===
On 20 November 2017, Joseph signed as a free agent for Selangor on a one-year contract, which had the option of being extended depending on his performance for the club.

=== Kuching FA/Kuching City FC ===
After concluding his contract with Selangor, Joseph returned to his home state Sarawak and joined Kuching FA, a Malaysia M3 League club on 3 January 2019. With Kuching FA, he helped the team promoted to 2020 Malaysia Premier League by finishing second in the 2019 season; ironically defeating and relegating his old team Sarawak FA in the promotion/relegation playoffs, with Joseph scoring one of the goals in the 3–1 win.

Joseph continued to play for the team as Kuching, rebranded as Kuching City in 2022, finished in the top half of the Premier League in each of the 3 seasons (2020, 2021 and 2022), and played for the first time in the newly expanded Super League in 2023. Joseph also had captained the team in the latter seasons.

He announced his retirement from professional football on 3 April 2024, citing his physical struggle to cope with competitive football at the age of 37.

== Style of play ==
In his early years at Sarawak FA, Joseph was deployed in several positions, most notably as a deep-lying midfielder and a wide midfielder primarily on the right side as he was deemed too small to play in the middle of the park. After three years of developing his physical traits, in the 2008 season, manager Kunju Jamaluddin inserted Joseph into the playmaker role, where his vision, technical skill, and ability to read and understand the game suited him. Since that season, Joseph has been primarily deployed in the position or as a central attacking midfielder at both club and international level. The player has personally admitted that playing centrally is his preference. However, as a result of his versatility, Joseph can also function on the wing and spent the majority of his career at Terangganu occupying the role in the team's 4–4–2 formation

== International career ==
In July 2011, Joseph was called up to represent Malaysia Selection against Chelsea.

Joseph made his international debut for the Malaysia national team in a friendly match with Australia on 7 October 2011, which Malaysia lost heavily 5–0.

In 2015, Joseph and Ronny Harun was selected for a friendly match against Hong Kong which ended goalless under coach Dollah Salleh.

== Career statistics ==
=== Club ===
As of match played 22 December 2022.

Appearances and goals by club, season and competition
Club	Season	League			Cup		League Cup		Continental		Total	
Club	Season	Division	Apps	Goals	Apps	Goals	Apps	Goals	Apps	Goals	Apps	Goals
Terengganu	2016	Malaysia Super League	19	4	4	0	1	0	–		24	4
Terengganu	Total		19	4	4	0	1	0	–		24	4
Pahang	2017	Malaysia Super League	13	2	3	0	4	2	–		20	4
Pahang	Total		13	2	3	0	4	2	–		20	4
Selangor	2018	Malaysia Super League	9	0	3	0	2	0	–		14	1
Selangor	Total		9	0	3	0	2	1	–		14	1
Kuching City	2019	Malaysia M3 League	22	17	1	0	0	0	0	0	23	17
Kuching City	2020	Malaysia Premier League	11	1	0	0	0	0	0	0	11	1
Kuching City	2021	Malaysia Premier League	18	4	0	0	5	0	0	0	23	4
Kuching City	2022	Malaysia Premier League	15	0	2	0	4	0	0	0	21	0
Kuching City	Total		66	22	3	0	9	0	–		78	22
Career Total			0	0	0	0	0	0	–	–	0	0

=== International ===
As of 29 March 2016

Appearances and goals by national team and year
National team	Year	Apps	Goals
Malaysia	2011	1	0
Malaysia	2014	1	2
Malaysia	2015	4	0
Malaysia	2016	1	0
Total		7	2

==== International goals ====
As of match played 20 September 2014. Malaysia score listed first, score column indicates score after each Joseph Kalang Tie goal.

International goals by date, venue, cap, opponent, score, result and competition
No.	Date	Venue	Cap	Opponent	Score	Result	Competition
1	20 September 2014	Shah Alam Stadium, Shah Alam, Malaysia	2	Cambodia	1–0	4–1	Friendly
2	20 September 2014	Shah Alam Stadium, Shah Alam, Malaysia	2	Cambodia	3–0	4–1	Friendly

== Honours ==
=== Club ===
Terengganu FA

- Malaysia FA Cup: 2011

Sarawak FA

- Malaysia Premier League: 2013

Pahang FA

- Malaysia FA Cup: Runners-up 2017

Kuching City

- Malaysia M3 League: Runners-up 2019
