= Moustapha Dabo =

Senegalese footballer

Personal information
- Date of birth: 27 February 1986 (age 40)
- Place of birth: Dakar, Senegal
- Height: 1.86 m (6 ft 1 in)
- Position: Forward

Senior career*
Years	Team	Apps	(Gls)
2005–2006	UGS Genève	8	(6)
2006–2010	Sion	15	(1)
2007–	→ Servette (loan)	15	(7)
2008–	→ Sion B	10	(3)
2008–2009	→ St. Gallen (loan)	22	(9)
2009–2010	Al-Sailiya	10	(1)
2010–2011	Al-Ittihad Kalba	2	(0)
2011–	Yverdon-Sport	16	(2)
2011–2012	Aarau	14	(4)
2012–2013	Spartaks Jūrmala	4	(0)
2013–	Gabala	7	(1)
2013–2014	Kahramanmaraşspor	6	(0)
2014–2014	Terengganu	4	(3)
2015–2016	Monthey	11	(7)
2016–2018	Vevey Sports		
- * Club domestic league appearances and goals

Moustapha Dabo (born 17 February 1986) is a Senegalese former professional footballer who played as a forward

== Career ==
Making a promising start to his career at Urania Genève Sport, Dabo soon transferred to Sion. Unable to establish himself at Sion, he spent much of his time on loan at other clubs. After Sion, he made the move to Qatar playing briefly for Al-Sailiya and even less for Al-Ittihad Kalba in the United Arab Emirates. He made a return to Switzerland signing for Yverdon-Sport in January 2011. Six months later, he moved to the league rivals FC Aarau. In July 2012 Dabo was signed by the Latvian Higher League club Spartaks Jūrmala. During the season, he played four matches, without scoring any goals. In October 2012 Dabo was released. Emeghara was released by Gabala halfway through his contract at the end of the 2012–13 season.

=== Gabala ===
In January 2013 Dabo signed a one-year contract with Azerbaijan Premier League team Gabala. He made his debut for Gabala in 1–1 draw at home to Qarabağ on 10 February 2013. His first, and only, goal for Gabala came in his second appearance for Gabala in their 6–1 defeat away to AZAL on 3 March 2012. Dabo went on to make a total of eight appearances in all competitions with only the one goal to his name. He was released by Gabala halfway through his contract at the end of the 2012–13 season.

Following his release from Gabala, Dabo signed with Kahramanmaraşspor of the TFF First League in August 2013.

== Career statistics ==
As of 19 May 2013

Appearances and goals by club, season and competition
Club	Season	League			National cup (Note: Includes Swiss Cup, Emir of Qatar Cup, Latvian Cup, Azerbaijan Cup, Turkish Cup.)		Europe		Other		Total	
Club	Season	Division	Apps	Goals	Apps	Goals	Apps	Goals	Apps	Goals	Apps	Goals
FC Sion	2006–07	Swiss Super League	7	0			—		—		7	0
FC Sion	2009–10	Swiss Super League	8	1			1	0	—		9	1
FC Sion	Total		15	1	0	0	1	0	0	0	17	1
St. Gallen (loan)	2008–09	Swiss Challenge League	22	9			—		—		22	9
Al-Sailiya SC	2009–10	Qatar Stars League		1	0	0	—		—			1
Ittihad Kalba'	2010–11	UAE Division 1 Group A	2	0	0	0	—		—		2	0
Yverdon-Sport	2010–11	Swiss Challenge League	16	2	0	0	—		—		16	2
FC Aarau	2011–12	Swiss Challenge League	14	4	0	0	—		—		14	4
Spartaks Jūrmala	2012	Latvian Higher League	4	0	1	0	—		—		5	0
Gabala	2012–13	Azerbaijan Premier League	7	1	1	0	—		—		8	1
Kahramanmaraşspor	2013–14	TFF First League	6	0	1	0	—		—		7	0
Terengganu	2014	Malaysia Super League		3			—		—			3
Total				21	3	0	1	0	0	0		21
