= Sharbinee Allawee =

Malaysian footballer

Personal information
- Full name: Mohd Sharbinee Allawee bin Ramli
- Date of birth: 7 December 1986 (age 39)
- Place of birth: Kuala Terengganu, Malaysia
- Height: 1.76 m (5 ft 9 1/2 in)
- Position: Goalkeeper

Youth career
- 2003–2006: Terengganu President's Cup Team

Senior career*
| Years | Team | Apps | (Gls) |
| 2006–2012 | Terengganu | 78 | (0) |
| 2013—2014 | Selangor | 1 | (0) |
| 2014–2017 | Terengganu | 63 | (0) |
| 2018–2019 | Kuala Lumpur | 10 | (0) |
| 2020 | Pahang | 6 | (0) |
| 2021–2022 | Sarawak United | 23 | (0) |

International career^{‡}
| 2006–2009 | Malaysia U23 | 8 | (0) |
| 2009–2011 | Malaysia | 9 | (0) |
Medal record
Men's football
Representing Malaysia
ASEAN Championship
| Winner | 2010 AFF Championship |
Malaysia U23
SEA Games
| First place | 2009 Vientiane | Football |
- * Club domestic league appearances and goals as of 11 August 2021 ‡ National team caps and goals as of 4 August 2014

Mohd Sharbinee Allawee bin Ramli (born 7 December 1986) is a Malaysian footballer who plays as a goalkeeper for Sarawak United. At international level, he has so far represented his country as Malaysia national team goalkeeper from 2009 to 2011.

== Club career ==
=== Terengganu ===
Sharbinee debuted with his state team Terengganu in 2006. He then became the first choice goalkeeper for Terengganu for six years. Although Sharbinee is one of the top goalkeepers in Malaysia, he also was criticised for his mistakes that gifts goals to opponents, such as his mistake in 2011 Malaysia Cup final against Negeri Sembilan.

=== Selangor ===
After six years playing for Terengganu, Sharbinee signed a one-year contract with Selangor in the 2013 Malaysia Super League season, reuniting with his former coach in Terengganu, Irfan Bakti Abu Salim. He made his debut for Selangor in the league match against Pahang on 19 January 2013.

Sharbinee spent the entire season as the Selangor's second choice goalkeeper behind Norazlan Razali and returned to Terengganu for the 2014 season.

=== Kuala Lumpur ===
On 27 May 2018, Sharbinee signed a contract with Kuala Lumpur after being released from Terengganu. He made his debut for Kuala Lumpur on 2 June 2018 in a 3–0 win over Terengganu.

=== Pahang ===
Sharbinee played for the Pahang FA football team in 2020 and made only six appearances that year for the team.

=== Sarawak United ===
Sharbinee joined Sarawak United in 2021, just one week before the start of the 2021 Malaysia Premier League season.

== International career ==
Sharbinee was a member of the 2009 Laos Sea Games Football Gold medal-winning squad.

In November 2010, Sharbinee was called up to the Malaysia national team by coach K. Rajagopal for the 2010 AFF Suzuki Cup. Sharbinee was in the first eleven against Indonesia in Group A first match. He conceded five goals as Malaysia lose 5–1. As a result, Sharbinee was then replaced by Khairul Fahmi Che Mat as the main goalkeeper for the later games, as Malaysia won the 2010 AFF Suzuki Cup title for the first time in their history.

Sharbinee conceded five goals against Singapore in the first leg of 2014 FIFA World Cup qualification second round as Malaysia lose 5–3 in July 2011.

== Career statistics ==
=== Club ===
As of 21 September 2021

| Club | Season | League | | Cup | | League Cup | | Continental | | Total | |
| Club | Season | Apps | Goals | Apps | Goals | Apps | Goals | Apps | Goals | Apps | Goals |
|---|---|---|---|---|---|---|---|---|---|---|---|
| Selangor | 2013 | 1 | 0 | 0 | 0 | 0 | 0 | 4 | 0 | 5 | 0 |
| Selangor | Total | 1 | 0 | 0 | 0 | 0 | 0 | 4 | 0 | 5 | 0 |
| Terengganu | 2014 | 20 | 0 | 1 | 0 | 8 | 0 | – | – | 29 | 0 |
| Terengganu | 2015 | 22 | 0 | 5 | 0 | 6 | 0 | – | – | 33 | 0 |
| Terengganu | 2016 | 19 | 0 | 1 | 0 | 0 | 0 | – | – | 20 | 0 |
| Terengganu | 2017 | 2 | 0 | 0 | 0 | 0 | 0 | – | – | 2 | 0 |
| Terengganu | Total | 63 | 0 | 7 | 0 | 14 | 0 | 0 | 0 | 84 | 0 |
| Kuala Lumpur | 2018 | 10 | 0 | 0 | 0 | 6 | 0 | – | – | 16 | 0 |
| Kuala Lumpur | 2019 | 15 | 0 | 3 | 0 | 0 | 0 | – | – | 18 | 0 |
| Kuala Lumpur | Total | 25 | 0 | 3 | 0 | 6 | 0 | – | – | 34 | 0 |
| Pahang | 2020 | 6 | 0 | 0 | 0 | 0 | 0 | 0 | 0 | 0 | 0 |
| Pahang | Total | 6 | 0 | 0 | 0 | 0 | 0 | 0 | 0 | 0 | 0 |
| Sarawak United | 2021 | 19 | 0 | 0 | 0 | 0 | 0 | 0 | 0 | 19 | 0 |
| Sarawak United | Total | 19 | 0 | 0 | 0 | 0 | 0 | 0 | 0 | 19 | 0 |
| Career total | | 0 | 0 | 0 | 0 | 0 | 0 | 0 | 0 | 0 | 0 |

=== International ===
As of 16 November 2011

Malaysia
| Year | Apps | Goals |
|---|---|---|
| 2010 | 3 | 0 |
| 2011 | 6 | 0 |
| Total | 9 | 0 |

== Honours ==
=== Club ===
Terengganu

- Malaysia FA Cup: 2011

=== International ===
Malaysia U-23

- 2009 SEA Games: (gold) 2009

Malaysia

- AFF Suzuki Cup: 2010
