= Vincent Bikana =

Cameroonian professional footballer

Personal information
- Date of birth: February 26, 1992 (age 34)
- Place of birth: Douala, Cameroon
- Height: 1.87 m (6 ft 2 in)
- Position: Centre back

Senior career*
Years	Team	Apps	(Gls)
2011	Corinthians B	5	(0)
2010–2011	→ Olé Brasil (loan)	21	(6)
2011–2012	Neuchâtel Xamax	16	(3)
2012–2013	Petrolul Ploieşti	13	(2)
2013–2016	Terengganu	60	(6)
2018–2020	MP	43	(5)

International career
	Cameroon U20	6	(0)
- * Club domestic league appearances and goals as of 8 August 2016

Vincent Bikana (born 26 February 1992) is a Cameroonian professional footballer who plays as a defender for Malaysia Super League club Terengganu FC.

== Clubs ==
Neuchâtel Xamax purchased the Cameroonian under-20 international defender from Corinthians for a reported fee of €1.2 million. The Swiss club was eventually relegated from the Super League due to financial problems and Bikana joined a Romanian club Petrolul Ploieşti.

In November 2012, Bikana moved to Malaysian side Terengganu. His stint with Terengganu ends at the end the 2016 season.
