= Muhaimin Omar =

Malaysian footballer

Personal information
- Full name: Mohd Muhaimin bin Omar
- Date of birth: 17 March 1989 (age 37)
- Place of birth: Kuala Terengganu, Malaysia
- Height: 1.75 m (5 ft 9 in)
- Position: Right back

Youth career
- 2006–2008: Terengganu FA President's Cup Team

Senior career*
Years	Team	Apps	(Gls)
2009–2016	Terengganu	38	(0)

International career^{‡}
2010	Malaysia	1	(0)
- * Club domestic league appearances and goals as of 12 November 2014 ‡ National team caps and goals as of 15 July 2011

Mohd Muhaimin Omar (born 17 March 1989) is a Malaysian footballer. He currently plays for Malaysia Super League side Terengganu FA.

He was called up by Malaysia's coach, K. Rajagobal, for an international friendly match against Yemen and made his debut for Malaysia during the match.
