= Ahmad Azlan Zainal =

Malaysian footballer

Azlan Zainal
Personal information
- Full name: Ahmad Azlan bin Zainal
- Date of birth: 16 April 1986 (age 40)
- Place of birth: Kuala Lumpur, Malaysia
- Height: 1.79 m (5 ft 10 1/2 in)
- Position: Defender

Team information
- Current team: Kelana United
- Number: 3

Youth career
- 2004: Perak U-19

Senior career*
Years	Team	Apps	(Gls)
2004–2008	Perak	27	(0)
2008–2010	Kelantan		
2010–2011	Kuala Lumpur	9	(0)
2011–2013	PKNS FC		
2013–2015	Terengganu		
2016	Kuala Lumpur	20	(0)
2017	Sabah	2	(0)
2018	Hanelang	5	(0)
2019	Ultimate		
2019–	Kingstown Klang		

International career^{‡}
2004	Malaysia U-20	4	(1)
2006	Malaysia	2	(0)
- * Club domestic league appearances and goals as of October 6, 2019 ‡ National team caps and goals as of January 11, 2016

Ahmad Azlan bin Zainal (born 16 April 1986) is a Malaysian footballer who plays for Kingstown Klang FC as a defender. He was also a member of Malaysia's national team.

Born and grew up in Kuala Lumpur Azlan spend his teenage years in Bukit Jalil Sports School, Azlan later played for Perak President Team. Before being promoted onto Perak senior side.

Azlan began his career with Perak as a youth player in 2004. He helped Perak win the FA Cup Final in 2004 against Terengganu FA by 3-0 in Bukit Jalil Stadium. He also brings Perak FA reach the 2007 Malaysia Cup final, which they lost to Kedah FA, 3-0.

He made his senior international debut against New Zealand on 23 February 2006. Serve as captain of Malaysia's Under-20 team at the AFC Youth Championship 2004, where he scored one goal in the tournament. He also turned out for Malaysia's national Under-23 side at the 2006 Doha Asian Games, SEA Games 2006 in Manila, Philippines and was part of Malaysia's Under-23 squad which won the 2007 Merdeka Tournament.

He joined Kelantan FA for the 2009 season which ended prematurely due to a severe injury when he ruptured his anterior cruciate ligaments.

After being released by Kelantan, Azlan was signed by Kuala Lumpur as a free agent halfway through the 2010 season.

He agreed to join PKNS FC for the 2012 Malaysia Super League.

2016 - Azlan signed for his hometown, Kuala Lumpur after so long plying his trade for other team.
