= Hasmizan Kamarodin =

Malaysian footballer

Hasmizan Bin Kamarodin
Personal information
- Full name: Hasmizan Bin Kamarodin
- Date of birth: 24 January 1984 (age 42)
- Place of birth: Kuala Besut, Malaysia
- Height: 1.83 m (6 ft 0 in)
- Position: Centre-back

Team information
- Current team: Hanelang F.C.
- Number: 13

Youth career
- Bukit Jalil Sports School

Senior career*
Years	Team	Apps	(Gls)
2009–2010	Pahang	21	(4)
2011–2016	Terengganu	77	(0)
2017	Kelantan	4	(0)
2018–	Hanelang	2	(1)

International career^{‡}
2013	Malaysia	0	(0)
- * Club domestic league appearances and goals as of 11 March 2018 ‡ National team caps and goals as of 30 August 2013

Hasmizan Bin Kamarodin (born 24 January 1984 in Besut) is a Malaysian footballer who plays as a centre-back and former Malaysia national team player.

== Club career ==
=== Kelantan FA ===
In December 2016, Hasmizan signed with east coast team, Kelantan FA after 6 years playing for his hometown team, Terengganu FA.

On 22 February 2017, Hasmizan made his debut during postponed match against Melaka United in Sultan Muhammad IV Stadium. He played side by side with Gambian Mamadou Danso as a left centre-back. Kelantan has lost during that match by 0–2 score.

== International career ==
In August 2013, Hasmizan has been included in the Malaysia national team's training squad with training due to go on from September 1 to 6 at Wisma FAM, before they fly out to China on Sept 7 for an international “A” friendly against the Chinese national team at the Tianjin Olympic Centre Stadium on Sept 10. However, Hasmizan has had to withdraw and miss the chance of earning his first-ever international cap due to a hamstring injury picked up in the Malaysia Cup match against Pahang FA.

== Career statistics ==
=== Club statistics ===
As of 28 October 2017.

Club performance			League		Cup		League Cup		Continental		Total	
Season	Club	League	Apps	Goals	Apps	Goals	Apps	Goals	Apps	Goals	Apps	Goals
2006–07	UPB-MyTeam	Liga Premier	0	0	0	0	0	0	—		0	0
2007–08	UPB-MyTeam	Liga Premier	0	0	0	0	0	0	–		0	0
Total			0	0	0	0	0	0	0	0	0	0
2009	Pahang	Liga Super	2	0	0	0	0	0	—		0	0
2010	Pahang	Liga Super	0	2	0	0	0	0	–		0	0
Total			0	4	0	0	0	0	0	0	0	0
2011	Terengganu	Liga Super	18	0	0	0	0	0	—		18	0
2012	Terengganu	Liga Super	4	0	0	0	0	1	–		4	1
2013	Terengganu	Liga Super	14	0	5	0	2	0	–		21	0
2014	Terengganu	Liga Super	9	0	1	0	7	0	–		17	0
2015	Terengganu	Liga Super	13	0	3	0	6	1	–		22	1
2016	Terengganu	Liga Super	19	0	1	0	0	0	–		20	0
Total			77	0	10	0	14	2	0	0	0	0
2017	Kelantan	Liga Super	4	0	0	0	0	0	—		4	0
Total			4	0	0	0	0	0	0	0	4	0
Career total			0	0	0	0	0	0	0	0	0	0
