= Fakhrurazi Musa =

Malaysian footballer

Personal information
- Full name: Muhammad Fakhrurazi bin Musa
- Date of birth: 26 September 1991 (age 35)
- Place of birth: Kuala Terengganu, Malaysia
- Height: 1.70 m (5 ft 7 in)
- Position: Midfielder

Team information
- Current team: SATU F.C.

Youth career
- 2010–2011: T–Team

Senior career*
Years	Team	Apps	(Gls)
2011–2016	Terengganu	27	(2)
2017–2018	Terengganu II	16	(1)
- * Club domestic league appearances and goals

Muhammad Fakhrurazi bin Musa (born 26 September 1991) is a Malaysian professional footballer who plays as a midfielder.

== Career statistics ==
=== Club ===
As of 13 July 2018

Club	Season	League		Cup		League Cup		Continental		Total	
Club	Season	Apps	Goals	Apps	Goals	Apps	Goals	Apps	Goals	Apps	Goals
Terengganu II	2017	16	1	2	0	6	2	–	–	24	3
Terengganu II	2018	10	0	–	–	0	0	–	–	10	0
Terengganu II	Total	16	1	2	0	6	2	0	0	24	3
