= Ismail Faruqi Ashari =

Malaysian footballer

Ismail Faruqi
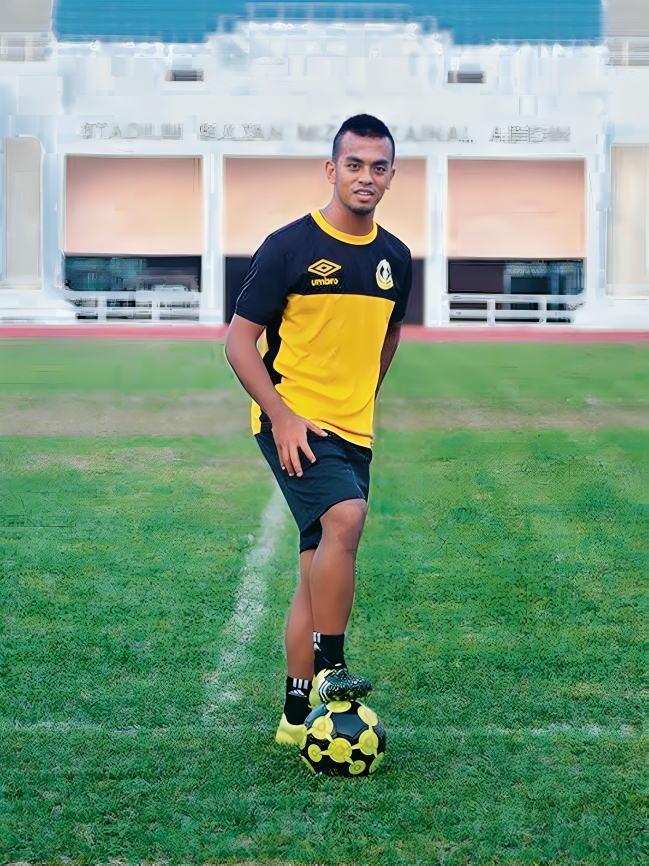

Personal information
- Full name: Ismail Faruqi bin Asha'ri
- Date of birth: 15 October 1986 (age 40)
- Place of birth: Kuala Terengganu, Malaysia
- Height: 1.65 m (5 ft 5 in)
- Position: Attacking midfielder

Team information
- Current team: Terengganu II
- Number: 11

Youth career
- 2005–2007: Terengganu

Senior career*
Years	Team	Apps	(Gls)
2007–2008	Terengganu	16	(3)
2009–2010	T–Team	24	(2)
2011–2018	Terengganu	66	(13)
2018–2020	Terengganu II	2	(0)

International career^{‡}
2011–2015	Malaysia	5	(0)
- * Club domestic league appearances and goals as of 15 July 2018 ‡ National team caps and goals as of 8 October 2016

Ismail Faruqi bin Asha'ri (born 15 October 1986 in Kuala Terengganu) is a former Malaysian footballer in the Malaysia Super League. He played as a central midfielder and sometimes attacking midfielder for the squad.

== Career ==
He made his debut for Malaysia national football team in the 2014 FIFA World Cup qualifying match against Singapore on 23 July 2011. On 2015, Malaysian former coach Ong Kim Swee called him up for a friendly against Laos which they won 3-1 and for the 2018 World Cup Qualifiers against Timor Leste which they won 1–0.
