= Ashari Samsudin =

Malaysian footballer

Personal information
- Full name: Mohamad Ashari bin Samsudin
- Date of birth: 7 June 1985 (age 41)
- Place of birth: Terengganu, Malaysia
- Height: 1.80 m (5 ft 11 in)
- Positions: Forward; winger

Youth career
- 2003–2005: Terengganu U-21

Senior career*
Years	Team	Apps	(Gls)
2005–2016	Terengganu	184	(81)
2017	Pahang	16	(3)
2018–2019	Terengganu	30	(3)
2019	Terengganu II	1	(0)

International career
2008–2013	Malaysia	17	(3)
Medal record
Men's Football
Representing Malaysia
AFF Championship
Winner	2010
- * Club domestic league appearances and goals

Mohamad Ashari bin Samsudin (born 7 June 1985) is a retired Malaysian footballer who mainly played as a right winger but could also play as a forward and attacking midfielder.

Ashari known as "The Silent Killer" by Malaysian media and fans had great dribbling skill with good vision and pace in the game. making him one of the fan's favourites. He spent most of career with Terengganu where he made more than 330 appearances scoring 128 goals in all competitions.

== Club career ==
=== Terengganu ===
Originally from Bukit Payong, Marang, Terengganu, Ashari started his career with Terengganu youth team. He promoted to Terengganu's senior team in the 2005 Malaysia Cup. In the quarter final match against Kedah, he scored his first senior goal started with a solo run and then shot 25 meter into the goal.

He is consistently scoring for Terengganu. He was second top scorer in the 2009 season with 17 goals, one goal behind the winner Mohd Nizaruddin Yusof. He goes one better in the 2010 Super League Malaysia season, winning the Golden Boot while scoring 18 goals. In the 2011 league season, he scored 10 goals.

Among his achievements with Terengganu is winning the 2011 Malaysia FA Cup and defeating Kelantan in the final on 11 June 2011. He also was the top scorer in the Sukma Games 2008 football tournament held at Terengganu, where he helped the Terengganu youth team win the gold medal. In the 2012 Malaysia League Cup Final, he scored the opening goal for his team in a 2–1 loss to Negeri Sembilan.

=== Pahang ===
On 7 November 2016, it was announced that Ashari signed a one-year contract with Pahang.

== International career ==
Ashaari capped 17 times and scored 3 international goals for Malaysia. He received his first national call up under B. Sathianathan in 2008.

He made his international senior debut for Malaysia against India on 22 July 2008. Ashari scored his first international goals in Malaysia 6–0 trashing of Afghanistan in the 2008 Pestabola Merdeka, where Ashari scored twice.

In November 2010, Ashari was called up to the Malaysia national squad by coach K. Rajagopal for the 2010 AFF Suzuki Cup. Ashari scored 1 goal from outside penalty box for Malaysia against Indonesia in the first leg of the final to secure a 3–0 win, and helping Malaysia en route to win 4–2 on the aggregate the AFF Suzuki Cup for the first time in their history.

== Career statistics ==
=== Club ===
As of match played 7 September 2019.

Appearances and goals by club, season and competition
Club	Season	League			Cup		League Cup		Others		Total	
Club	Season	Division	Apps	Goals	Apps	Goals	Apps	Goals	Apps	Goals	Apps	Goals
Terengganu	2005	Malaysia Premier League	–		–			1	–			1
Terengganu	2005–06	Malaysia Premier League		2		0		0	–			2
Terengganu	2006–07	Malaysia Super League		4		0		0	–			4
Terengganu	2007–08	Malaysia Super League		10		4		3	–			17
Terengganu	2009	Malaysia Super League		17		0		5	–			22
Terengganu	2010	Malaysia Super League		18		1		1	–			20
Terengganu	2011	Malaysia Super League	25	10	6	3	10	6	–		41	19
Terengganu	2012	Malaysia Super League	24	7	5	1	5	0	7	2	41	10
Terengganu	2013	Malaysia Super League	19	4	6	5	6	3	–		31	12
Terengganu	2014	Malaysia Super League	19	2	2	0	8	4	–		29	6
Terengganu	2015	Malaysia Super League	19	4	4	0	3	0	–		26	4
Terengganu	2016	Malaysia Super League	16	3	0	0	5	0	–		21	3
Terengganu	Total			81		14		23	7	2		120
Pahang	2017	Malaysia Super League	16	3	6	0	5	0	–		27	3
Pahang	Total		16	3	6	0	5	0	–		27	3
Terengganu	2018	Malaysia Super League	20	2	2	0	11	4	–		33	6
Terengganu	2019	Malaysia Super League	10	1	2	1	1	0	–		13	2
Terengganu	Total		30	3	4	0	12	4	–		46	8
Terengganu II	2019	Malaysia Premier League	1	0	–		–		5	2	6	2
Terengganu II	Total		1	0	–		–		5	2	6	2
Career Total				87		15		27	12	4		133

=== International ===
As of 28 August 2017

Appearances and goals by national team and year
National team	Year	Apps	Goals
Malaysia	2008	6	2
Malaysia	2009	1	0
Malaysia	2010	5	1
Malaysia	2011	2	0
Malaysia	2012	1	0
Malaysia	2013	2	0
Total		17	3

==== International goals ====
International goals by date, venue, cap, opponent, result and competition
No.	Date	Venue	Cap	Opponent	Result	Competition
1	20 October 2008	National Stadium Bukit Jalil, Kuala Lumpur	4	Afghanistan	6–0 (Note: Ashari scored two goals)	2008 Pestabola Merdeka
2	26 December 2010	National Stadium Bukit Jalil, Kuala Lumpur	10	Indonesia	3–0	2010 AFF Suzuki Cup

== Honours ==
=== Club ===
Terengganu

- Malaysia FA Cup : 2011
- Sukma Games : 2006, 2008

Pahang

- Malaysia Super League : 2017 runner-up
- Malaysia FA Cup : 2017 runner-up

=== International ===
Malaysia

- AFF Championship : 2010 winner
- Pestabola Merdeka : 2008 runner-up

Individual

- Malaysia Super League Golden Boot : 2010 (18 goals)
- Sukma Games Top Scorer : 2008
