= Abdul Manaf Mamat =

Malaysian footballer

Personal information
- Full name: Abdul Manaf bin Mamat
- Date of birth: 8 April 1987 (age 39)
- Place of birth: Kuala Terengganu, Malaysia
- Height: 1.71 m (5 ft 7 in)
- Position: Forward

Team information
- Current team: Kingston Klang FC
- Number: 20

Youth career
- 2006–2008: Terengganu

Senior career*
Years	Team	Apps	(Gls)
2009–2015	Terengganu	127	(37)
2016	Kelantan	5	(0)
2018	Kuantan FA	4	(3)
2018	MOF	11	(6)
2019	Batu Dua	19	(9)
2019	Kingstown Klang		
2020–	Harini		

International career^{‡}
2007–2009	Malaysia U-23		
2009–2015	Malaysia	11	(2)
Medal record
Men's football
Representing Malaysia
Malaysia
AFF Championship
Runner-up	AFF Suzuki Cup 2014	2014
Malaysia U23
SEA Games
First place	2009 Vientiane	Football
Malaysia U20
AFF U20
Runner-up	2006 AFF U-20
- * Club domestic league appearances and goals as of 6 October 2019 ‡ National team caps and goals as of 22:00, 6 December 2015 (UTC)

Abdul Manaf bin Mamat (born 8 April 1987) is a Malaysian professional footballer who plays for Klang Town FC as a forward. He made nine appearances for the Malaysia national team scoring twice.

== Career ==
Manaf has played for the Malaysia national team and Malaysia U23. He played one Olympic qualification match against Japan in 2007.

He was selected by Malaysia coach K.Rajagobal for the 2009 SEA Games football tournament. He scored one goal against Cambodia in the group stage, as Malaysia won the competition.

He made his full international debut against Saudi Arabia in August 2009. He only scored twice for the Malaysian senior team, both of which were against Lesotho.

Born in Kuala Terengganu, Manaf began playing football as a striker with local side Terengganu. In 2011, Manaf won his first domestic title, the Malaysia FA Cup with Terengganu by defeating Kelantan. Manaf scored six goal in 2011 Malaysia Cup and was a part of the team that lose 2–1 to Negeri Sembilan FA in the final. On 5 December 2015, he was revealed as one of Kelantan new player for 2016 Malaysia Super League. After he fully healed from his leg injury, he finally get to debut for the team as a substitute for Wan Zack Haikal in the match against his former club, Terengganu which ended in 6–1 win for the away team.

Manaf started the 2018 season with Marcerra Kuantan. The club hit financial problems, was expelled from the league, and he terminated his contract in April 2018; he joined MOF F.C. for the remainder of the season. After being a star player and a Malaysia international earlier in his career, Manaf struggled for months without pay while playing for Kuantan and Batu Dua. He had to sell durian fruit to supplement his footballing income.

== Career statistics ==
=== Club ===
As of 27 October 2017

Appearances and goals by club, season and competition
Club	Season	League			Malaysia FA Cup		Malaysia Cup		AFC Cup		Total	
Club	Season	Division	Apps	Goals	Apps	Goals	Apps	Goals	Apps	Goals	Apps	Goals
Terengganu	2009	Malaysia Super League							—			
Terengganu	2010	Malaysia Super League							—			
Terengganu	2011	Malaysia Super League	22	13	0	0	11	6	—		23	19
Terengganu	2012	Malaysia Super League	11	4	1	2	0	0	1	1	13	7
Terengganu	2013	Malaysia Super League	19	3	5	1	2	0	—		26	4
Terengganu	2014	Malaysia Super League	10	4	1	1	7	1	—		18	6
Terengganu	2015	Malaysia Super League	15	0	4	1	0	0	—		19	1
Terengganu	Total		77	24	11	5	20	7	1	1	109	37
Kelantan	2016	Malaysia Super League	5	0	0	0	4	1	—		9	1
Kuala Lumpur	2017	Malaysia Super League	16	1	0	0	5	0	—		21	1
Career total			98	25	11	5	29	8	1	1	139	39

=== International ===
As of 11 October 2016.

Appearances and goals by national team and year
National team	Year	Apps	Goals
Malaysia	2009	1	2
Malaysia	2012	1	0
Malaysia	2014	6	0
Malaysia	2015	1	0
Total		9	2

Scores and results list Malaysia's goal tally first, score column indicates score after each Manaf goal.

List of international goals scored by Abdul Manaf Mamat
No.	Date	Venue	Opponent	Score	Result	Competition
Under-23
1	8 December 2009	Vientiane, Laos	Cambodia	1–0	4–0	2009 SEA Games
Senior
1	11 September 2009	MPPJ Stadium, Malaysia	Lesotho	3–0	5–0	Friendly
2	11 September 2009	MPPJ Stadium, Malaysia	Lesotho	5–0	5–0	Friendly

== Honours ==
=== Club ===
Terengganu

- Malaysia FA Cup: 2011

=== International ===
Malaysia U-20

- AFF U-20 Youth Championship : 2006 runner-up

Malaysia U-23

- SEA Games : 2009

Malaysia

- 2014 AFF Suzuki Cup: runner-up

=== Individual ===
- AFF U-20 Youth Championship Top Scorer : 2006
