= 2015 Perak FA season =

Perak
2015 season
- President: Zainol Fadzi Paharudin
- Manager: Azhar Ahmad
- Head Coach: Vjeran Simunić (until 1 January); M. Karathu (from 1 January)
- Stadium: Perak Stadium
- Super League: 8th
- FA Cup: Quarter-finals
- Malaysia Cup: Group stage
- Top goalscorer: League: Charles Souza Chad; Namkung Woong (9); All: Namkung Woong (13)
Home colours	Away colours	Third colours

The 2015 season was Perak's 12th consecutive season in the Malaysian Super League.

== Background ==
On September 16, Croatian coach Vjeran Simunic was named as new head coach, replacing Abu Bakar Fadzim who managed to steer Perak clear of relegation with the help of technical director Karlheinz Weigang, who was himself appointed mid-season.

The official 2015 squad was named on December 4. Some of the notable signings included Malaysian international Bobby Gonzales and former Harimau Muda A goalkeeper Mohd Zamir Selamat. Of the foreign players from the previous season, only Marco Tulio was retained. The remaining foreign player slots were filled by Charles Souza Chad and Thiago Junior Aquino. Namkung Woong was named to fill the Asian foreign player quota despite rumours linking Mohd Shahrazen Said.

On December 31, Simunic was officially replaced by M. Karathu, without having ever taken charge in an official match.

== Players ==
=== First team squad ===
No.	Name	Nationality	Position
Goalkeepers
1	Syazani Puat	(Malaysia)	GK
18	Zamir Selamat	(Malaysia)	GK
22	Azizon Abdul Kadir	(Malaysia)	GK
Defenders
2	Azmizi Azmi	(Malaysia)	RB, LB
5	Muhd Arif Ismail	(Malaysia)	CB, LB
6	Syazwan Roslan	(Malaysia)	RB, CB
15	Idris Ahmad	(Malaysia)	CB, LB
17	Tuah Iskandar Jamaluddin	(Malaysia)	RB
21	Sumardi Hajalan	(Malaysia)	LB
24	Hisyamudin Sha'ari	(Malaysia)	CB, RB
26	Thiago Junio	(Brazil)	CB
—	Rafiq Faeez Fuad	(Malaysia)	RB, CB
Midfielders
4	Mohd Nasir Basharuddin (captain)	(Malaysia)	CM, DM
7	Hafiz Ramdan	(Malaysia)	LM, LW
11	Ridzuan Azly Hussham	(Malaysia)	RM, RW
12	Vikneswaren a/l Sarkunanan	(Malaysia)	RM, RW, RB
13	Ahmad Sukri Abdul Hamid	(Malaysia)	CM
16	Nurridzuan Abu Hassan	(Malaysia)	LM, LW
19	Namkung Woong	(South Korea)	AM, CM, ST
20	Marco Tulio Lopes Silva	(Brazil)	AM, CM, LM
25	Norhakim Isa	(Malaysia)	CM
35	Ahmad Khairil Anuar Ahmad Zamri	(Malaysia)	RM, LM, RW, LW
36	Horace James	(Jamaica)	AM
—	Mohd Faizal Mansor	(Malaysia)	LM, LB
Forwards
8	Hamizul Izaidi Zulkifli	(Malaysia)	ST
9	Bobby Gonzales	(Malaysia)	ST
10	Charles Souza Chad	(Brazil)	ST
23	Haris Safwan Kamal	(Malaysia)	ST

== Pre-season And Friendlies ==
15 Dec 2014 Friendly	Perak	1–2	Kedah	Stadium Perak, Ipoh
20:45 UTC+08:00	Charles Souza Chad 7'		Keith Nah 49', 62'

30 Dec 2014 Friendly	Kedah	1–1	Perak	Darul Aman Stadium, Alor Setar
20:45 UTC+08:00	Keith Nah 28'		Namkung Woong 68'

== Competitions ==
=== Super League ===
==== League table ====
Pos	Team	Pld	W	D	L	GF	GA	GD	Pts	Qualification or relegation
6	PDRM	22	11	2	9	42	39	+3	35	
7	LionsXII (Note: LionsXII are not eligible for any AFC competition spots)	22	9	6	7	36	32	+4	33	End of MOU saw club dissolved at the end of the season.
8	Perak	22	8	4	10	32	33	−1	28	
9	Kelantan	22	8	4	10	34	38	−4	28	
10	Sarawak	22	4	7	11	28	40	−12	19	

Source: FAM Official Site, Astro Arena
Rules for classification: 1) points; 2) goal difference; 3) number of goals scored

==== Matches ====
Win Draw Loss

7 February 2015 1	Perak	2–0	Sime Darby	Ipoh, Perak
20:45 UTC+08:00	Nurridzuan 29'; Namkung 86'	Report	Dragičević (red card) 58'	Stadium: Perak Stadium; Attendance: 10,000; Referee: Mohd Nafeez Abdul Wahab

14 February 2015 2	ATM	0–2	Perak	Paroi, Negeri Sembilan
20:45 UTC+08:00		Report	Nasir 21'; Nurridzuan 53'	Stadium: Tuanku Abdul Rahman Stadium; Attendance: 1,500; Referee: Wan Mohd Tarmizi Wan Ibrahim

21 February 2015 3	Perak	2–2	LionsXII	Perak Stadium, Ipoh, Perak
20:45 UTC+08:00	Chad 27'; Namkung 48'		Khairul Amri 3'; Firdaus Kasman 67'	Attendance: 12,000; Referee: Suhaizi Shukri

6 March 2015 4	Perak	0–0	Kelantan	Perak Stadium, Ipoh, Perak
20:45 UTC+08:00				Attendance: 20,000; Referee: Zamzaidi Katimin

14 March 2015 5	Perak	1–3	PDRM	Perak Stadium, Ipoh, Perak
20:45 UTC+08:00	Nurridzuan 47'	Report	Traore 48', 61'; Ezrie 56'	Attendance: 9,000; Referee: Samsudin Ibrahim

4 April 2015 6	Felda United	1–4	Perak	Selayang, Selangor
20:45 UTC+08:00	Edward Junior 47'	Report	Chad 6', 50', 90+3'; Namkung 82'	Stadium: Selayang Stadium; Attendance: 4,525; Referee: Samsudin Ibrahim

14 March 2015 7	Perak	2–3	Terengganu	Ipoh, Perak
20:45 UTC+08:00	Namkung 21'; Chad 82'	Report	Bikana 64'; Ismail 75'; Helmi 85'	Stadium: Perak Stadium; Attendance: 10,000; Referee: Nagor Amir Noor Mohamed

24 April 2015 8	Perak	2–1	Johor Darul Ta'zim	Ipoh, Perak
20:45 UTC+08:00	Kamara (o.g.) 50'; Chad 56'	Report	Aidil 27'	Stadium: Perak Stadium; Attendance: 20,000; Referee: Suhaizi Shukri

2 May 2015 9	Selangor	1–2	Perak	Shah Alam, Selangor
20:45 UTC+08:00	de Paula 19'	Report	Namkung 45+3'; Nurridzuan 62'	Stadium: Shah Alam Stadium; Attendance: 17,884; Referee: Syed Azhar Syed Kamar

5 May 2015 10	Pahang	1–0	Perak	Kuantan, Pahang
20:45 UTC+08:00	Conti 71'	Report		Stadium: Darulmakmur Stadium; Attendance: 9,689; Referee: Muhd Nazmi Nasaruddin

20 June 2015 11	Sarawak	1–1	Perak	Kuching, Sarawak
20:45 UTC+08:00	Griffiths 60'	Report	Namkung 58'	Stadium: Sarawak Stadium; Attendance: 2,100; Referee: Mohd Nafeez Abdul Wahab

23 June 2015 12	Perak	3–1	Sarawak	Ipoh, Perak
20:45 UTC+08:00	Chad 12', 33'; Namkung 60'	Report	Mehmet 58'	Stadium: Perak Stadium; Attendance: 1,625; Referee: Zulkifli Ahmad

27 June 2015 13	Sime Darby	1–3	Perak	Selayang, Selangor
20:45 UTC+08:00	Perovic 18'	Report	James 30'; Chad 45+1'; Nasir 75'	Stadium: Selayang Stadium; Attendance: 2,317; Referee: Samsudin Ibrahim

4 July 2015 14	Perak	2–1	ATM	Ipoh, Perak
20:45 UTC+08:00	Nurridzuan 22'; Namkung 66'	Report	Venice Elphi 42'	Stadium: Perak Stadium; Attendance: 5,500; Referee: Lismotia Mohem Tisan

8 July 2015 15	LionsXII	2–1	Perak	Jalan Besar Stadium, Singapore
20:45 UTC+08:00	Hafiz 45'; Safuwan 52'		Namkung 12'	Attendance: 3,108; Referee: Mohd Nafeez Abdul Wahab

1 August 2015 16	Kelantan	1–0	Perak	Kota Bharu, Kelantan
20:45 UTC+08:00	Wan Zack 72'			Stadium: Sultan Muhammad IV Stadium; Attendance: 6,343; Referee: Muhd Nazmi Nasaruddin

5 August 2015 17	PDRM	3–2	Perak	Shah Alam, Selangor
20:45 UTC+08:00	Ali Ashfaq 11', 68'; Traore 58'		Thiago Junio 90+2'; James 90+4'	Stadium: Shah Alam Stadium; Attendance: 2,000; Referee: Zulkifli Ahmad

8 August 2015 18	Perak	0–2	Felda United	Ipoh, Perak
20:45 UTC+08:00			Shukor 60'; Raffi Cohen 69'	Stadium: Perak Stadium

12 August 2015 19	Terengganu	2–1	Perak	Kuala Terengganu, Terengganu
20:45 UTC+08:00	Ismail 22'; Nakajima-Farran 26'		Bobby 37'	Stadium: Sultan Mizan Zainal Abidin Stadium

15 August 2015 20	Perak	1–1	Pahang	Ipoh, Perak
20:45 UTC+08:00	Bobby 69'		Hafiz 32'	Stadium: Perak Stadium

19 August 2015 21	Johor Darul Ta'zim	4–1	Perak	Larkin, Johor
20:45 UTC+08:00	Figueroa 44'; Nazrin 47'; Chanturu 66'; Safiq 72'		Thiago Junio 60'	Stadium: Tan Sri Dato' Haji Hassan Yunos Stadium

22 August 2015 22	Perak	0–2	Selangor	Ipoh, Perak
20:45 UTC+08:00			Hazwan 27' de Paula 70'	Stadium: Perak Stadium

=== FA Cup ===
Knockout stage

28 February 2015 Round of 32	Shahzan Muda	1–3	Perak	Temerloh, Pahang
16:15 UTC+08:00	Sukri Jaafar 28'		Namkung 5', 48'; Tulio 45+1'	Stadium: Temerloh Mini Stadium; Attendance: 231; Referee: Ramli Mat Dahlan

17 March 2015 Round of 16	Perak	2–1	T-Team	Ipoh, Perak
20:45 UTC+08:00	Namkung 17', 32'		Tadjiyev 15'	Stadium: Perak Stadium; Attendance: 5,000; Referee: Muhd Nazmi Nasaruddin

Quarter-finals

7 April 2015 First Leg	Terengganu	1–1	Perak	Kuala Terengganu, Terengganu
20:45 UTC+08:00	Ismail (red card) 57'; Rangel 90+5' (pen.)		Zubir 45' (o.g.)	Stadium: Sultan Ismail Nasiruddin Shah Stadium; Attendance: 8,782; Referee: Muhd Nazmi Nasaruddin

21 April 2015 Second Leg	Perak	0–2 (1–3 agg.)	Terengganu	Ipoh, Perak
20:45 UTC+08:00			Rangel 21'; Nakajima-Farran 56'	Stadium: Perak Stadium; Attendance: 5,000; Referee: Wan Mohd Tarmizi Wan Ibrahim

=== Malaysia Cup ===
==== Group stage ====
Pos	Team	Pld	W	D	L	GF	GA	GD	Pts		JDT	SAR	ATM	PER
1	Johor Darul Ta'zim	6	5	1	0	15	4	+11	16	Advance to knockout phase	—	1–1	4–0	2–0
2	Sarawak	6	2	2	2	5	7	−2	8	Advance to knockout phase	0–3	—	1–0	1–0
3	ATM	6	2	1	3	10	13	−3	7		2–3	2–2	—	4–3
4	Perak	6	1	0	5	5	11	−6	3		1–2	1–0	0–2	—

Source: FAM Astro Arena

11 September 2015 1	Johor Darul Ta'zim	2–0	Perak	Johor Bahru, Johor
20:45 UTC+8	Safee 17'; Chanturu 23'	Report		Stadium: Tan Sri Dato Haji Hassan Yunos Stadium; Attendance: 18,710; Referee: Syed Azhar Syed Kamar

19 September 2015 2	Perak	1–0	Sarawak	Ipoh, Perak
20:45 UTC+8	Bobby 63'	Report		Stadium: Perak Stadium; Attendance: 3,500; Referee: Samsudin Ibrahim

26 September 2015 3	Perak	0–2	ATM	Ipoh, Perak
20:45 UTC+8		Report	Pelacios 40'; Venice 89'	Stadium: Perak Stadium; Attendance: 7,000; Referee: Mohd Zamzaidi Katimin

17 October 2015 4	Sarawak	1–0	Perak	Kuching, Sarawak
20:45 UTC+8	J. Partiban 35'	Report		Stadium: Sarawak State Stadium; Attendance: 0 Referee: Samsudin Ibrahim

4 November 2015 5	Perak	1–2	Johor Darul Ta'zim	Ipoh, Perak
20:45 UTC+8	Chad 29'	Report	Amri 37'; Safee 45+2'	Stadium: Perak Stadium; Attendance: 5,339; Referee: Zulkifli Ahmad

8 November 2015 6	ATM	4–3	Perak	Seremban, Negeri Sembilan
20:45 UTC+8	Karlović 12', 59'; Norfazly 32'; Abdulafees 36'	Report	Khairil Anuar 45'; Chad Souza 63', 88'	Stadium: Tuanku Abdul Rahman Stadium; Attendance: 360; Referee: S. Sittharanjanan

== Transfers ==
=== In ===
Pos	Player	Transferred From
GK	(Malaysia) Azizon Abdul Kadir	(Malaysia) PDRM
GK	(Malaysia) Zamir Selamat	(Malaysia) PKNS
DF	(Malaysia) Azmizi Azmi	(Malaysia) Kedah
DF	(Malaysia) Arif Ismail	(Malaysia) Sime Darby
DF	(Brazil) Thiago Junio	(Vietnam) Đồng Nai
DF	(Malaysia) Sumardi Hajalan	(Malaysia) Negeri Sembilan
DF	(Malaysia) Faizal Mansor	(Malaysia) PBAPP
MF	(South Korea) Namkung Woong	(Malaysia) Kedah
MF	(Malaysia) Nurridzuan Abu Hassan	(Malaysia) Harimau Muda A
ST	(Brazil) Charles Chad	(Malaysia) PDRM
ST	(Malaysia) Bobby Gonzales	(Malaysia) PDRM
ST	(Malaysia) Haris Safwan Kamal	(Malaysia) Felda United

=== Out ===
Pos	Player	Transferred To
GK	(Malaysia) Razi Effendi Suhit	(Malaysia) ATM
GK	(Malaysia) Muhd Fitry Kamal Ariffin	(Malaysia) Kuantan
GK	(Malaysia) Mohd Nor Haziq Aris	(Malaysia) PKNS
DF	(Malaysia) Mohd Fazli Zulkifli	Unattached
DF	(Malaysia) Mohd Norhizwan Hassan	(Malaysia) Kuantan
DF	(Malaysia) Noor Hazrul Mustafa	(Malaysia) Kelantan
DF	(Malaysia) Azmeer Yusof	(Malaysia) ATM
DF	(Lebanon) Hassan Daher	Unattached
MF	(Malaysia) Yoganathan a/l Munusamy	(Malaysia) Sabah FA
MF	(Malaysia) Mohammad Hardi Jaafar	Unattached
MF	(Malaysia) Partiban a/l K.Janasekaran	(Malaysia) Sarawak
MF	(Malaysia) Mohd Nazri Mohd Kamal	(Malaysia) Sarawak
MF	(Malaysia) Mohd Hidayat Amaruddin	(Malaysia) UiTM
ST	(Malaysia) Razali Umar Kandasamy	Unattached
MF	(Malaysia) Muhammad Zahiruddin Zulkifli	(Malaysia) Melaka United
MF	(Malaysia) Mohamed Faridzuan Yusuf	(Malaysia) UiTM
ST	(Malaysia) Shahrizal Saad	(Malaysia) Negeri Sembilan
ST	(Nigeria) Abdulafees Abdulsalam	(Malaysia) ATM
ST	(Montenegro) Milan Purović	(Malaysia) Kuantan

== Coaching staff ==
Position	Staff
Manager	Datuk Azhar Ahmad
Assistant Manager	Isham Shahruddin
HeadCoach	Vjeran Simunic M. Karathu (1 Januari 2015)
Assistant Coach	Abu Bakar Fadzim Chong Yee Fat
Goalkeeper Coach	Suhaimi Mat Lazim
HeadCoach B21	Sayuddin Mohd Isa
HeadCoach B19	Khairul Azuar Kamiron
Fitness Coach	Sam Pakiaraj
Physiotherapy	Noradam Mohd Azam Sulaiman Amri
Kitman	Abdul Rashid
Team Assistant	Ahmad Helmi Ahmad Jamal
Press Media	Abdul Aziz Mohd Desa

== Statistics ==
=== Top scorers ===
The list is sorted by shirt number when total goals are equal.

Rnk	Pos	No.	Player	Super League	FA Cup	Malaysia Cup	Total
1	MF	19	(South Korea) Namkung Woong	9	4	0	13
2	FW	10	(Brazil) Charles Souza Chad	9	0	3	12
3	MF	16	(Malaysia) Nurridzuan	5	0	0	5
4	MF	4	(Malaysia) Nasir Basharudin	2	1	0	3
4	ST	9	(Malaysia) Bobby Gonzales	2	0	1	3
6	DF	26	(Brazil) Thiago Junio	2	0	0	2
6	MF	36	(Jamaica) Horace James	2	0	0	2
8	ST	20	(Brazil) Marco Tulio	0	1	0	1
8	MF	35	(Malaysia) Khairil Anuar	0	0	1	1
#	Own goals			1	0	0	1
Total				32	6	5	43

Updated to match played 8 November 2015
Source: Competitions
