= 2017 Perak FA season =

Perak TBG
2017 season
- President: Dato' Seri Abdul Puhat Mat Nayan
- Manager: Shahrul Azhar
- Head coach: Mehmet Duraković
- Stadium: Perak Stadium
- Malaysia Super League: 5th
- Malaysia FA Cup: Round of 16
- Malaysia Cup: Semi-finals
- Top goalscorer: League: Yashir Pinto (5); All: Gilmar Filho (10)
- Highest home attendance: 28,000 vs Johor Darul Ta'zim (15 October 2017)
- Lowest home attendance: 0 vs Melaka United (4 February 2017); 0 vs PBMS (15 February 2017)
- Average home league attendance: 6,475
Home colours	Away colours

The 2017 season was Perak The Bos Gaurus Football Club's 14th consecutive season in Malaysia Super League. The team is competing in Malaysia Super League, the Malaysia FA Cup, and the Malaysia Cup.

The season is Mehmet Duraković's first in charge of the club.

== Squad information ==
=== First-team squad ===
As of 28 October 2017
Appearances contain league matches only

Players name in bold indicates the player is registered during the mid-season transfer window, while players name in italic indicates the player is de-registered or loaned out during the mid-season transfer window.

No.	Name	Nat	Position(s)	Since	Date of birth (age)	Signed from	Games	Goals
Goalkeepers
1	Muhamad Syazani Mat Puat	(Malaysia)	GK	2016	20 May 1994 (age 32)	(Malaysia) Perak youth	0	0
18	Khairul Amri Salehuddin	(Malaysia)	GK	2017	22 December 1989 (age 36)	(Malaysia) Penang	0	0
22	Hafizul Hakim	(Malaysia)	GK	2016	30 March 1993 (age 33)	(Malaysia) Melaka United	22	0
Defenders
2	Muhd Arif Ismail	(Malaysia)	CB, LB	2015	7 March 1986 (age 40)	(Malaysia) Sime Darby	0	0
3	Shahrul Saad	(Malaysia)	CB, DM, RB	2016	8 July 1993 (age 33)	(Malaysia) Felda United	20	2
5	Shahrom Kalam (captain)	(Malaysia)	CB, RB, LB	2017	15 September 1985 (age 41)	(Malaysia) Selangor	17	0
6	K. Shatiya	(Malaysia)	CB	2017	29 January 1990 (age 36)	(Malaysia) DRB-Hicom	1	0
15	Mohd Idris Ahmad	(Malaysia)	CB, LB	2017	5 May 1990 (age 36)	(Malaysia) Felda United	5	0
16	Ibrahim Aziz	(Malaysia)	RB, CB	2017	11 January 1993 (age 33)	(Malaysia) DRB-Hicom	0	0
21	Nazirul Naim Che Hashim	(Malaysia)	LB, LM	2016	6 April 1993 (age 33)	(Malaysia) Harimau Muda	20	0
23	Amirul Azhan Aznan	(Malaysia)	RB, RWB	2016	23 July 1993 (age 33)	(Malaysia) Perak youth	19	0
26	Thiago Junior	(Brazil)	CB	2015	3 April 1984 (age 42)	(Vietnam) Đồng Nai	22	2
—	Muhd Raffi Nagoorgani	(Malaysia)	LB, CB	2016	18 January 1992 (age 34)	(Malaysia) Perak youth	0	0
Midfielders
4	Nasir Basharudin (vice-captain)	(Malaysia)	CM, DM	2010	29 March 1990 (age 36)	(Malaysia) Perak youth	20	2
7	Ahmad Khairil Anuar	(Malaysia)	CM, LM	2015	8 March 1995 (age 31)	(Malaysia) Perak youth	7	0
12	D. Kenny Pallraj	(Malaysia)	DM, CM, DC, DR, DL	2016	21 April 1993 (age 33)	(Malaysia) Harimau Muda	11	0
13	Wan Ahmad Syukri Wan Ahmad	(Malaysia)	DM, CM	2017	10 November 1991 (age 35)	(Malaysia) MIFA	0	0
19	Jasazrin Jamaluddin	(Malaysia)	CM, DM	2017	3 April 1986 (age 40)	(Malaysia) Johor Darul Ta'zim	7	0
20	Nazrin Nawi	(Malaysia)	LW, AM	2017	7 February 1988 (age 38)	(Malaysia) Johor Darul Ta'zim	15	2
25	**Leandro Dos Santos**	(Brazil)	RW, AM, ST	2017	29 October 1986 (age 40)	(Brazil) Luverdense	7	0
27	Mohd Hafiz Kamal	(Malaysia)	CM, AM	2017	9 July 1987 (age 39)	(Malaysia) Selangor	15	4
—	Faton Toski	(Kosovo)	AM, CM	2017	17 February 1987 (age 39)	(Albania) KF Laçi	10	1
—	Norhakim Isa	(Malaysia)	CM	2014	24 January 1993 (age 33)	(Malaysia) Perak youth	0	0
—	Mohamad Hafiz Ramdan	(Malaysia)	LM, LW	2015	28 June 1993 (age 33)	(Malaysia) Perak youth	0	0
—	Muhammad Ridzuan Azly Hussham	(Malaysia)	RM, RW	2014	13 November 1992 (age 33)	(Malaysia) Perak youth	0	0
Forwards
8	Zaquan Adha	(Malaysia)	ST	2017	3 August 1987 (age 39)	(Malaysia) Johor Darul Ta'zim II	21	2
11	Yashir Pinto	(Palestine)	ST, RW, LW	2017	9 May 1990 (age 36)	(Malaysia) Melaka United	19	5
14	Abdul Hadi Yahya	(Malaysia)	ST	2017	6 March 1985 (age 41)	(Malaysia) Selangor	14	2
30	Mohd Nizad Ayub	(Malaysia)	ST, AM	2017	30 August 1988 (age 38)	(Malaysia) Ministry of Finance	5	0
51	**Gilmar Jose da Silva Filho**	(Brazil)	ST	2017	28 November 1988 (age 37)	(Brazil) Boa Esporte	7	2
—	Vladislav Mirchev	(Bulgaria)	ST	2017	23 January 1987 (age 39)	(Bulgaria) OFC Nesebar	12	4

=== Coaching staff ===
Position	Staff
First-team manager	(Malaysia) Jamal Mohd Aris (former)
First-team manager	(Malaysia) Ahmad Shahrul Azhar Sofian (current)
Head coach	(Germany) Karl-Heinz Weigang (until 22 February 2017)
Head coach	(Australia) Mehmet Durakovic (starting 22 February 2017)
Assistant coach	(Malaysia) Chong Yee Fatt
Coach	(Malaysia) Mohd Syahman Zainuddin
Goalkeeping coach	(Malaysia) Mohd Azlen Ahmad Jabri
Fitness coach	(Malaysia) Sam Pakiaraj a/l Victor Davaraj
Head physio	(Malaysia) R. Seerla
Physiotherapist	(Malaysia) Mohd Nor Adam Mohd Azam
Sport Masseur	(Malaysia) Lokman Adil Ihsan
Team Assistant	(Malaysia) Ahmad Helmi Ahmad Jamal
Under-21 head coach	(Malaysia) Sayuddin Mohd Isa
Under-19 head coach	(Malaysia) Mohd Shahril Nizam Khalil

== Management team ==
=== Club personnel ===
Under new management, the Presidency was taken over by the Secretary General State of Perak, Yang Berhormat Dato' Seri Abdul Puhat Mat Nayan on 4 October 2015.

Position	Name
President	(Malaysia) YB Dato' Seri Abdul Puhat Mat Nayan
Deputy President	(Malaysia) Dato' Shahrul Zaman Yahya
Vice-Presidents	(Malaysia) Datuk Rasidi Ibrahim
Vice-Presidents	(Malaysia) Datuk Muhammad Yadzan Mohammad
Vice-Presidents	(Malaysia) Datuk G. Irudianathan
Treasurer	(Malaysia) Khairul Azwan Dato' Harun
Executive Committee Members	(Malaysia) Reduan Amir Hamzah
Executive Committee Members	(Malaysia) Mahhadee Ramlee
Executive Committee Members	(Malaysia) Mohd Rizairi Jamaludin
Executive Committee Members	(Malaysia) Zainal Anuar Abdul Rashid
Executive Committee Members	(Malaysia) Mohd Jamil Zakaria
Executive Committee Members	(Malaysia) Abdul Jamil Othman
Executive Committee Members	(Malaysia) Johari Baharom
Executive Committee Members	(Malaysia) Jurij Jamaludin
Executive Committee Members	(Malaysia) Najib Mokhtar

== Pre-season and friendlies ==
Win Draw Loss Postponed

=== Pre-season ===
17 December 2016 Friendly	Sime Darby (Kuala Lumpur)	0–1	Perak	Shah Alam, Selangor
16:45				Stadium: Padang Latihan Sime Darby F.C.

24 December 2016 Friendly	Perak	1–2	(Kuala Lumpur) FELCRA	Ipoh, Perak
16:45				Stadium: Perak Stadium

31 December 2016 Friendly	Perak	1–1	(Malaysia) ATM	Ipoh, Perak
16:45				Stadium: Perak Stadium

4 January 2017 Friendly	Perak	3–2	(Malaysia) MISC-MIFA	Ipoh, Perak
16:45				Stadium: Perak Stadium

8 January 2017 Friendly	Perak	2–2	(Malaysia) PDRM	Ipoh, Perak
16:45				Stadium: Perak Stadium

14 January 2017 Friendly	UKM (Malaysia)	2–3	Perak	Bangi, Selangor
20:45				Stadium: UKM Bangi Stadium

=== Friendlies ===
8 June 2017 Friendly	Navy Selection	0–10	Perak	Lumut, Perak
22:00				Stadium: TLDM Stadium

15 June 2017 Friendly	19 RAMD	0–5	Perak	Lumut, Perak
22:00				Stadium: TLDM Stadium

20 June 2017 Friendly	ATM	2–3	Perak	Kuala Lumpur
22:30				Stadium: ATM Mini Stadium

22 June 2017 Friendly	MISC-MIFA	0–1	Perak	Sepang, Selangor
22:00				Stadium: Sepang Municipal Council Field

== Competitions ==
=== Overview ===
Competition	Record								Started round	Current position / round	Final position / round	First match	Last match
Competition	P	W	D	L	GF	GA	GD	Win %	Started round	Current position / round	Final position / round	First match	Last match
Super League	22	9	7	6	30	31	−1	40.91	—	Finished	5th	21 January 2017	28 October 2017
Malaysia FA Cup	2	1	0	1	3	2	+1	50.00	Round of 32	—	Round of 16	15 February 2017	11 March 2017
Malaysia Cup	10	6	2	2	19	10	+9	60.00	Group stage	—	Semi-finals	4 July 2017	22 October 2017
Total	34	16	9	9	52	43	+9	47.06					

Updated to match played 28 October 2017
Source: Super League fixtures and results

=== Malaysia Super League ===
==== League table ====
Pos	Team	Pld	W	D	L	GF	GA	GD	Pts	Qualification or relegation
3	Felda United (Note: Felda United were relegated because they failed to renew their licence) (R)	22	11	6	5	40	26	+14	39	Relegation to Premier League
4	Kedah (Note: Kedah as 2017 Malaysia FA Cup winners not eligible for AFC competition spots as they failed granted AFC club license.)	22	9	8	5	45	33	+12	35	
5	Perak	22	9	7	6	30	31	−1	34	
6	Selangor	22	9	6	7	32	28	+4	33	
7	PKNS	22	6	7	9	33	38	−5	25	

Source: FAM, FMLLP
Rules for classification: 1) Points; 2) Goal difference; 3) Number of goals scored.
(R) Relegated

==== Results by round ====
Round	1	2	3	4	5	6	7	8	9	10	11	12	13	14	15	16	17	18	19	20	21	22
Ground	H	A	H	A	H	A	H	A	H	A	H	A	H	A	H	A	H	A	H	A	H	A
Result	D	W	W	L	W	D	L	W	D	D	D	L	D	W	L	W	W	L	W	L	W	W
Position	6	5	2	3	3	4	5	4	5	5	4	5	4	4	6	6	5	6	6	6	5	5

Updated to match(es) played on 28 October 2017. Source: Super League fixtures and results
A = Away; H = Home; W = Win; D = Draw; L = Loss

==== Matches ====
Win Draw Loss Postponed

First round

21 January 2017 1	Perak	1–1	Pahang	Ipoh, Perak
21:00 UTC+8	Thiago 68'	Report	56' Syamim Yahya	Stadium: Perak Stadium; Attendance: 19,720; Referee: Muhammad Nazmi Bin Nasaruddin

27 January 2017 2	Penang	0–1	Perak	Batu Kawan, Penang
21:00 UTC+8		Report	77' Shahrul Saad	Stadium: Penang State Stadium; Referee: Mohd Zamzaidi Bin Katimin

4 February 2017 3	Perak	3–2	(Malacca) Melaka	Ipoh, Perak
21:00 UTC+8	Thiago 31'; Pinto 64'; Mirchev 90+3'	Report	43' Woo-young; 79' Izzaq	Stadium: Perak Stadium; Attendance: 0 Referee: Nagor Amir Noor Mohamed

11 February 2017 4	PKNS (Selangor)	3–0	Perak	Shah Alam, Selangor
21:00 UTC+8	Lucas 45+1', 47'; Safee 85'	Report		Stadium: Shah Alam Stadium; Attendance: 4,882; Referee: Suhaimi Mat Hassan

18 February 2017 5	Perak	2–1	Johor DT	Ipoh, Perak
21:00 UTC+8	Pinto 8'; Mirchev 75'	Report	10' Hazwan	Stadium: Perak Stadium; Attendance: 22,382; Referee: Suhaizi Shukri

25 February 2017 6	Felda United (Kuala Lumpur)	2–2	Perak	Jengka, Pahang
21:00 UTC+08:00	Norshahrul 67'; Lucas 68'	Report	13' Hafiz; 51' Zaquan	Stadium: Tun Abdul Razak Stadium; Attendance: 2,992; Referee: Mohd Zohri Tajuddin

1 March 2017 7	Perak	2–4	Kelantan	Ipoh, Perak
21:00 UTC+08:00	Mirchev 18', 90+2'	Report	38', 83', 88' (pen.) Ghaddar; 90+3' Indra	Stadium: Perak Stadium; Attendance: 5,570; Referee: Mohd Nafeez Abd Wahab

4 March 2017 8	Selangor	0–1	Perak	Selayang, Selangor
21:00 UTC+08:00		Report	67' (pen.) Zaquan	Stadium: Majlis Perbandaran Selayang Stadium; Attendance: 9,000; Referee: Nagor Amir Bin Noor Mohamed

8 April 2017 9	Perak	2–2	(Terengganu) T-Team	Ipoh, Perak
21:00 UTC+08:00	Pinto 13'; Hadi 90+6' (pen.)	Report	49' Dilshod; 72' Fakhrurazi	Stadium: Perak Stadium; Attendance: 1,961; Referee: Mohammad Zamzaidi Katimin

15 April 2017 10	Sarawak	3–3	Perak	Kuching, Sarawak
20:15 UTC+08:00	Mateo 9'; Hairol 22'; Rahim 50'	Report	17' Toski; 20' Hafiz; 73' Hadi	Stadium: Sarawak State Stadium; Attendance: 2,465; Referee: Khirulazuan Kidam

26 April 2017 11	Perak	1–1	Kedah	Ipoh, Perak
21:00 UTC+08:00	Hafiz 61'	Report	71' Baddrol	Stadium: Perak Stadium; Attendance: 3,753; Referee: Nagor Amir Noor Mohamed

Second round

6 May 2017 12	T-Team (Terengganu)	3–0	Perak	Kuala Terengganu, Terengganu
21:00 UTC+08:00	Samassa 9'; Amirzafran 72'; Tadjiyev 76'	Report		Stadium: Sultan Ismail Nasiruddin Shah Stadium; Attendance: 888; Referee: Fitri Maskon

24 May 2017 13	Perak	0–0	Sarawak	Ipoh, Perak
21:00 UTC+08:00		Report		Stadium: Perak Stadium; Attendance: 1,350; Referee: Wan Mohammad Tarmizi

1 July 2017 14	Kedah	2–3	Perak	Alor Setar, Kedah
21:00 UTC+08:00	Sandro 59'; Liridon 85'	Report	30' (o.g.) Syazwan T. 47' Nasir; 73' Gilmar	Stadium: Darul Aman Stadium; Attendance: 7,656; Referee: Suhaimi Mat Hassan

11 July 2017 15	Perak	0–1	Selangor	Ipoh, Perak
21:00 UTC+08:00		Report	63' Doe	Stadium: Perak Stadium; Attendance: 7,090; Referee: Mohd Nafeez Abd Wahab

15 July 2017 16	Kelantan	0–2	Perak	Kota Bharu, Kelantan
21:00 UTC+08:00		Report	29' Nazrin; 80' Pinto	Stadium: Sultan Muhammad IV Stadium; Attendance: 1,523; Referee: Suhaimi Mat Hassan

22 July 2017 17	Perak	1–0	(Kuala Lumpur) Felda United	Shah Alam, Selangor
21:00 UTC+08:00	Pinto 12' (pen.)	Report		Stadium: Shah Alam Stadium; Attendance: 2,678; Referee: Mohd Zohri Tajuddin

26 July 2017 18	Johor DT	2–1	Perak	Johor Bahru, Johor
21:00 UTC+08:00	Fadhli 47'; Ghaddar 60'	Report	45+1' Mohd Hafiz Kamal	Stadium: Larkin Stadium; Attendance: 16,985; Referee: Suhaizi Shukri

5 August 2017 19	Perak	2–0	(Selangor) PKNS	Ipoh, Perak
21:00 UTC+08:00	Nazrin 55'; Gilmar 59'	Report		Stadium: Perak Stadium; Attendance: 5,310; Referee: Zulkarnain Zakaria

20 September 2017 20	Melaka (Malacca)	3–1	Perak	Krubong, Malacca
21:00 UTC+08:00	Šimić 30'; Jeon Woo-young 72'; Felipe 83' (pen.)	Report	50' Shahrul	Stadium: Hang Jebat Stadium; Attendance: 1,683; Referee: Suresh Jayaraman

27 September 2017 21	Perak	1–0	Penang	Ipoh, Perak
21:00 UTC+08:00	Nizad 25'	Report		Stadium: Perak Stadium; Attendance: 1,412; Referee: Fitri Maskon

28 October 2017 22	Pahang	1–1	Perak	Kuantan, Pahang
21:00 UTC+08:00	Christie 24'	Report	80' Nasir	Stadium: Darul Makmur Stadium; Attendance: 1,759; Referee: Nagor Amir Noor Mohamed

=== Malaysia FA Cup ===
==== Knockout stage ====
Win Draw Loss Postponed

15 February 2017 R32	Perak	3–0	(Selangor) PBMS	Ipoh, Perak
21:00 UTC+8	Mirchev 13'; Toski 25', 49'	Report		Stadium: Perak Stadium; Attendance: 0 Referee: Mohd Hasrol Mohd Amir

11 March 2017 R16	Perak	0–2	Kedah	Ipoh, Perak
21:00 UTC+8		Report	28' Zac; 43' Ken Ilsø	Stadium: Perak Stadium; Attendance: 24,935; Referee: Mohd Nazmi Nasaruddin

=== Piala Malaysia ===
==== Group stage ====
Pos	Team	Pld	W	D	L	GF	GA	GD	Pts	Qualification
1	Perak	6	5	1	0	13	3	+10	16	Advance to knockout phase
2	(Pahang) FELDA United	6	3	2	1	11	7	+4	11	Advance to knockout phase
3	Kuala Lumpur	6	1	2	3	3	9	−6	5	
4	(Selangor) PKNS	6	0	1	5	4	12	−8	1	

Updated to match(es) played on 9 September 2017. Source: FAM FMLLP

Win Draw Loss Postponed

4 July 2017 GS1	Perak	2–0	(Selangor) PKNS	Ipoh, Perak
21:00 UTC+08:00	Thiago 71'; Gilmar 80'	Report		Stadium: Perak Stadium; Attendance: 5,200; Referee: Fitri Maskon

7 July 2017 GS2	Kuala Lumpur	0–3	Perak	Selayang, Selangor
16:45 UTC+08:00		Report	58', 82' Gilmar; 72' Leandro	Stadium: Selayang Stadium; Attendance: 1,188; Referee: Suhaizi Shukri

18 July 2017 GS3	Felda United (Kuala Lumpur)	1–1	Perak	Jengka, Pahang
21:00 UTC+08:00	Zah Rahan 66'	Report	65' Shahrul	Stadium: Tun Abdul Razak Stadium; Attendance: 1,320; Referee: Suhaimi Mat Hassan

29 July 2017 GS4	PKNS (Selangor)	1–3	Perak	Shah Alam, Selangor
21:00 UTC+08:00	Wleh 83'	Report	28' (pen.) Pinto; 61' Nazrin; 77' Gilmar	Stadium: Shah Alam Stadium; Attendance: 2,966; Referee: Mohammad Zamzaidi Katimin

1 August 2017 GS5	Perak	2–0	Kuala Lumpur	Ipoh, Perak
21:00 UTC+08:00	Gilmar 22'; Kenny 37'	Report		Stadium: Perak Stadium; Attendance: 3,525; Referee: Ku Alauddin Ku Muhammad

9 September 2017 GS6	Perak	2–1	(Kuala Lumpur) Felda United	Ipoh, Perak
21:00 UTC+08:00	Nizad 25'; Shahrul 80'	Report	52' Danial	Stadium: Perak Stadium; Attendance: 3,720; Referee: Razlan Joffri Ali

==== Knockout stage ====
16 September 2017 QF1	Pahang	3–1	Perak	Kuantan, Pahang
21:00 UTC+08:00	Wan Zaharulnizam 36'; Afif 38'; Matthew 41'	Report	69' Gilmar	Stadium: Darul Makmur Stadium; Attendance: 11,881; Referee: Razlan Jafri Ali

24 September 2017 QF2	Perak	4–0 (5–3 agg.)	Pahang	Ipoh, Perak
21:00 UTC+08:00	Gilmar 3', 63'; Kenny 77'; Nazrin 90+1'	Report		Stadium: Perak Stadium; Attendance: 9,015; Referee: Suhaimi Mat Hassan

15 October 2017 SF1	Perak	1–1	Johor Darul Ta'zim	Ipoh, Perak
21:00 UTC+08:00	Hasbullah 19' (o.g.)	Report	Ghaddar 68'	Stadium: Perak Stadium; Attendance: 28,000; Referee: Razlan Jeffri Ali

21 October 2017 SF2	Johor Darul Ta'zim	3–0 (4–1 agg.)	Perak	Johor Bahru, Johor
21:00 UTC+08:00	Cabrera 57', 81'; Guerra 75'	Report		Stadium: Larkin Stadium; Attendance: 21,140; Referee: Mohd Zohri Tajuddin

== Statistics ==
=== Appearances ===
No.	Pos.	Name	Super League		FA Cup		Malaysia Cup		Total		Discipline	
No.	Pos.	Name	Apps	Goals	Apps	Goals	Apps	Goals	Apps	Goals	Yellow card	Red card
1	GK	(Malaysia) Syazani Puat	0	0	0	0	1	0	1	0	0	0
2	DF	(Malaysia) Muhd Arif Ismail	0	0	0	0	0	0	0	0	0	0
3	DF	(Malaysia) Shahrul Saad	13 (7)	2	1	0	7 (3)	2	21 (10)	4	5	0
4	MF	(Malaysia) Nasir Basharudin	18 (2)	2	0 (1)	0	9 (1)	0	27 (4)	2	4	0
5	DF	(Malaysia) Shahrom Kalam	17	0	1	0	9	0	27	0	6	0
6	DF	(Malaysia) K. Shatiya	1	0	0	0	1	0	2	0	0	0
7	MF	(Malaysia) Ahmad Khairil Anuar	3 (4)	0	0 (1)	0	4 (1)	0	7 (6)	0	0	0
8	FW	(Malaysia) Zaquan Adha	15 (6)	2	2	0	5 (4)	0	22 (10)	2	2	0
11	FW	(Palestine) Yashir Pinto	19	5	1	0	5	1	25	6	6	0
12	MF	(Malaysia) D. Kenny Pallraj	4 (7)	0	0	0	4 (4)	1	8 (11)	1	6	0
13	MF	(Malaysia) Wan Syukri Ahmad	0 (1)	0	0	0	1	0	1 (1)	0	0	0
14	FW	(Malaysia) Abdul Hadi Yahya	5 (9)	2	0	0	1 (4)	0	6 (13)	2	3	0
15	DF	(Malaysia) Idris Ahmad	4 (1)	0	1	0	1	0	6 (1)	0	0	0
16	DF	(Malaysia) Ibrahim Aziz	0	0	0 (1)	0	0	0	0 (1)	0	0	0
18	GK	(Malaysia) Khairul Amri Salehuddin	0	0	1	0	0	0	1	0	0	0
19	MF	(Malaysia) Jasazrin Jamaluddin	4 (3)	0	2	0	1 (1)	0	7 (4)	0	1	0
20	MF	(Malaysia) Nazrin Nawi	11 (4)	2	1 (1)	0	6	2	18 (5)	4	2	0
21	DF	(Malaysia) Nazirul Naim Che Hashim	19 (1)	0	1	0	9	0	29 (1)	0	2	0
22	GK	(Malaysia) Hafizul Hakim	22	0	1	0	9	0	32	0	2	0
23	DF	(Malaysia) Amirul Azhan Aznan	17 (2)	0	1	0	9 (1)	0	27 (3)	0	4	0
25	MF	(Brazil) Leandro	6 (1)	0	0	0	6 (1)	1	12 (2)	1	5	0
26	DF	(Brazil) Thiago Junior	22	2	2	0	9	1	33	3	6	0
27	MF	(Malaysia) Hafiz Kamal	14 (1)	4	2	0	3	0	19 (1)	4	5	0
30	FW	(Malaysia) Nizad Ayub	2 (3)	1	0 (1)	0	1 (3)	1	3 (7)	2	0	0
51	FW	(Brazil) Gilmar	7	2	0	0	7	8	14	10	4	0
Players who left the club in June/July transfer window or on loan
9	MF	(Kosovo) Faton Toski	9 (1)	1	2	2	0	0	0	0	1	0
10	MF	(Malaysia) Norhakim Isa	2 (1)	0	0	0	0	0	0	0	1	0
17	FW	(Bulgaria) Vladislav Mirchev	9 (3)	4	2	1	0	0	0	0	0	0
24	MF	(Malaysia) Hafiz Ramdan	0 (2)	0	1	0	0	0	0	0	1	0
25	MF	(Malaysia) Ridzuan Azly	1 (3)	0	0	0	0	0	0	0	0	0
28	MF	(Malaysia) Raffi Nagoorgani	0	0	0	0	0	0	0	0	0	0

Last updated: 28 October 2017.
Source: Soccerway

=== Goalscorers ===
The list is sorted by shirt number when total goals are equal.

Rnk	Player	Pos	No.	Super League	FA Cup	Malaysia Cup	Total
1	(Brazil) Gilmar	FW	51	2	0	8	10
2	(Palestine) Yashir Pinto	FW	11	5	0	1	6
3	(Bulgaria) Vladislav Mirchev	FW	17	4	1	0	5
4	(Malaysia) Shahrul Saad	DF	3	2	0	2	4
4	(Malaysia) Nazrin Nawi	MF	20	2	0	2	4
4	(Malaysia) Hafiz Kamal	MF	27	4	0	0	4
7	(Kosovo) Faton Toski	MF	9	1	2	0	3
7	(Brazil) Thiago Junior	DF	26	2	0	1	3
9	(Malaysia) Zaquan Adha	FW	8	2	0	0	2
9	(Malaysia) D. Kenny Pallraj	MF	12	0	0	2	2
9	(Malaysia) Abdul Hadi Yahya	FW	14	2	0	0	2
9	(Malaysia) Nizad Ayub	FW	30	1	0	1	2
9	(Malaysia) Nasir Basharudin	MF	4	2	0	0	2
14	(Brazil) Leandro	MF	25	0	0	1	1
Own Goal				1	0	1	2
Total				30	3	19	52

Last updated: 28 October 2017.
Source: Soccerway

=== Clean sheets ===
The list is sorted by shirt number when total clean sheets are equal.

Rnk	No.	Player	Super League	FA Cup	Malaysia Cup	Total
1	22	(Malaysia) Hafizul Hakim	7	1	4	12

Last updated: 28 October 2017.
Source: Soccerway

=== Summary ===
Games played	34 (22 Super League) (2 FA Cup) (10 Malaysia Cup)
Games won	16 (9 Super League) (1 FA Cup) (6 Malaysia Cup)
Games drawn	9 (7 Super League) (2 Malaysia Cup)
Games lost	9 (6 Super League) (1 FA Cup) (2 Malaysia Cup)
Goals scored	52 (30 Super League) (3 FA Cup) (19 Malaysia Cup)
Goals conceded	43 (31 Super League) (2 FA Cup) (10 Malaysia Cup)
Goal difference	+9 (−1 Super League) (+1 FA Cup) (+9 Malaysia Cup)
Clean sheets	12 (7 Super League) (1 FA Cup) (4 Malaysia Cup)
Yellow cards	66 (42 Super League) (3 FA Cup) (21 Malaysia Cup)
Red cards	Nil
Most appearances	(Brazil) Thiago Junior (33 appearances)
Top scorer	(Brazil) Gilmar (10 goals)
Winning Percentage	Overall: 16/34 (47.06%)

Last updated: 28 October 2017.
Source: Soccerway

=== Home attendance ===
All matches, except MSL Matchday 17 (Shah Alam Stadium) played at Perak Stadium.

Date	Attendance	Opposition	Score	Competition	Ref.
21 January 2017	19,720	Pahang	1–1	Super League matchday 1	
4 February 2017	0	(Malacca) Melaka United	3–2	Super League matchday 3	
15 February 2017	0	(Selangor) PBMS	3–0	FA Cup round of 32	
18 February 2017	22,382	Johor Darul Ta'zim	2–1	Super League matchday 5	
1 March 2017	5,570	Kelantan	2–4	Super League matchday 7	
11 March 2017	24,935	Kedah	0–2	FA Cup round of 16	
8 April 2017	1,961	(Terengganu) T-Team	2–2	Super League matchday 9	
26 April 2017	3,753	Kedah	1–1	Super League matchday 11	
24 May 2017	1,350	Sarawak	0–0	Super League matchday 13	
4 July 2017	5,200	(Selangor) PKNS	2–0	Malaysia Cup matchday 1	
11 July 2017	7,090	Selangor	0–1	Super League matchday 15	
22 July 2017	2,678	(Kuala Lumpur) Felda United	1–0	Super League matchday 17	
1 August 2017	3,525	Kuala Lumpur	2–0	Malaysia Cup matchday 5	
5 August 2017	5,310	(Selangor) PKNS	2–0	Super League matchday 19	
9 September 2017	3,720	(Kuala Lumpur) Felda United	2–1	Malaysia Cup matchday 6	
24 September 2017	9,015	Pahang	4–0	Malaysia Cup Quarter-finals	
27 September 2017	1,412	Penang	1–0	Super League matchday 21	
15 October 2017	28,000	Johor Darul Ta'zim	1–1	Malaysia Cup Semi-finals	

== Transfers ==
=== In ===
Date	Pos	Player	From	Ref.
November 2016	GK	(Malaysia) Khairul Amri Salehuddin	(Malaysia) Penang	
December 2016	MF	(Malaysia) Nazrin Nawi	(Malaysia) Johor Darul Ta'zim	
December 2016	MF	(Malaysia) Jasazrin Jamaluddin	(Malaysia) Johor Darul Ta'zim	
December 2016	DF	(Malaysia) Idris Ahmad	(Malaysia) Felda United	
December 2016	DF	(Malaysia) Ibrahim Aziz	(Malaysia) DRB-Hicom	
December 2016	ST	(Malaysia) Mohd Nizad Ayub	(Malaysia) MOF	
December 2016	MF	(Malaysia) Wan Ahmad Syukri	(Malaysia) MIFA	
December 2016	DF	(Malaysia) K. Shathiya	(Malaysia) DRB-Hicom	
December 2016	ST	(Palestine) Yashir Pinto	(Malaysia) Melaka United	
December 2016	ST	(Bulgaria) Vladislav Mirchev	(Bulgaria) OFC Nesebar	
December 2016	MF	(Malaysia) Mohd Hafiz Kamal	(Malaysia) Selangor	
December 2016	DF	(Malaysia) Shahrom Kalam	(Malaysia) Selangor	
December 2016	ST	(Malaysia) Zaquan Adha	(Malaysia) Johor Darul Ta'zim II	
December 2016	ST	(Malaysia) Abdul Hadi Yahya	(Malaysia) Selangor	
January 2017	MF	(Kosovo) Faton Toski	(Albania) KF Laçi	
June 2017	ST	(Brazil) Gilmar Jose da Silva Filho	(Brazil) Boa Esporte Clube	
June 2017	MF	(Brazil) Leandro Dos Santos	(Brazil) Luverdense Esporte Clube	

=== Out ===
Date	Pos	Player	To	Ref.
November 2016	GK	(Malaysia) Mohd Zamir Selamat	(Malaysia) PKNS	
November 2016	DF	(Malaysia) Hisyamudin Sha'ari	(Malaysia) Kuala Lumpur	
November 2016	DF	(Malaysia) Tuah Iskandar Jamaluddin	(Malaysia) PJ Rangers	
November 2016	MF	(Malaysia) Nurridzuan Abu Hassan	(Malaysia) Pahang	
November 2016	MF	(Malaysia) Fazrul Hazli Kadri	(Malaysia) Felda United	
November 2016	DF	(Malaysia) Mohd Syazwan Mohd Roslan	(Malaysia) Perlis	
November 2016	DF	(Malaysia) Muhd Syahmil Khairi	Unattached	
November 2016	DF	(Malaysia) Irfan Abdul Ghani	Unattached	
November 2016	MF	(Uzbekistan) Oybek Kilichev	(Uzbekistan) Navbahor Namangan	
November 2016	FW	(Albania) Xhevahir Sukaj	(Albania) FK Partizani Tirana	
November 2016	FW	(Brazil) Elias Fernandes de Oliveira	(Brazil) São Caetano	
May 2017	ST	(Bulgaria) Vladislav Mirchev	Unattached	
May 2017	MF	(Kosovo) Faton Toski	Unattached	
May 2017	MF	(Malaysia) Norhakim Isa	(Malaysia) Melaka United	

==== Loans out ====
Date	Pos	Player	Loaned to	Ref.
November 2016	MF	(Malaysia) Ahmad Sukri Abdul Hamid	(Malaysia) PKNP	
November 2016	MF	(Malaysia) Mohd Fikri Sudin	(Malaysia) PKNP	
November 2016	MF	(Malaysia) Azrul Nizam Muhammad	(Malaysia) PKNP	
May 2017	MF	(Malaysia) Ridzuan Azly Hussham	(Malaysia) UiTM	
May 2017	MF	(Malaysia) Mohamad Hafiz Ramdan	(Malaysia) PKNP	
May 2017	DF	(Malaysia) Muhd Raffi Nagoorgani	(Malaysia) PKNP	
