= 2016 Perak FA season =

Perak
2016 season
- President: Abdul Puhat Mat Nayan
- Manager: Shahrul Zaman Yahya
- Head Coach: Karl-Heinz Weigang
- Stadium: Perak Stadium
- Super League: 6th
- FA Cup: Semi-finals
- Malaysia Cup: Group stage
- Top goalscorer: League: Elias (9); All: Elias (12)
- Highest home attendance: 27,000 vs PKNS (30 April 2016)
- Lowest home attendance: 1,700 vs Sarawak (21 May 2016)
- Average home league attendance: 11,062
Home colours	Away colours	Third colours

The 2016 season was Perak's 13th consecutive season in the Malaysian Super League.

== Players ==
=== First-team squad ===
As of 22 October 2016

No.	Name	Nationality	Position	Games	Goals
Goalkeepers
1	Syazani Mat Puat	(Malaysia)	GK	5	0
18	Zamir Selamat	(Malaysia)	GK	0	0
22	Hafizul Hakim	(Malaysia)	GK	17	0
Defenders
3	Shahrul Saad	(Malaysia)	CB / DM / RB	16	2
5	Muhd Arif Ismail	(Malaysia)	CB / LB	0	0
6	Syazwan Roslan	(Malaysia)	RB / CB	8	0
9	Rafiq Faeez Fuad	(Malaysia)	CB / DM / RB / LB	0	0
15	Raffi Nagoorgani	(Malaysia)	LB / CB	14	0
21	Nazirul Naim Che Hashim	(Malaysia)	LB / LWB / LM	15	1
23	Amirul Azhan Aznan	(Malaysia)	RB / RWB	12	0
24	Hisyamudin Sha'ari	(Malaysia)	CB	10	0
26	Thiago Junio	(Brazil)	CB	21	1
28	Azrul Nizam Muhammad	(Malaysia)	LB / LM	3	0
31	Shafiq Hashim	(Malaysia)	CB	0	0
32	Izzat Ramlee	(Malaysia)	RB / RWB	0	0
38	G. Gunasegaran	(Malaysia)	RB	3	0
39	Shazwan Zaifol	(Malaysia)	CB	2	0
40	R. Yuvaraj	(Malaysia)	CB	0	0
55	Irfan Abdul Ghani	(Malaysia)	LB / CB	1	0
57	Tuah Iskandar	(Malaysia)	RB / RWB	4	0
Midfielders
4	Nasir Basharudin (captain)	(Malaysia)	CM / DM	12	0
8	Hafiz Ramdan	(Malaysia)	LM / LW	8	0
10	Norhakim Isa	(Malaysia)	CM	8	0
11	Ridzuan Azly Hussham	(Malaysia)	RM / RW	13	1
12	D. Kenny Pallraj	(Malaysia)	DM / CM	16	2
13	Ahmad Sukri Hamid	(Malaysia)	CM	2	0
14	Fikri Sudin	(Malaysia)	RM / LM / RW / LW	14	0
16	Nurridzuan Abu Hassan	(Malaysia)	LW / LM	4	0
19	Fazrul Hazli	(Malaysia)	RM / RW	20	7
30	Oybek Kilichev	(Uzbekistan)	CM	9	0
30	**Erick Weeks Lewis**	(Liberia)	AM	11	0
33	Firdaus Saiyadi	(Malaysia)	CM	10	1
35	Ahmad Khairil Anuar	(Malaysia)	CM / LM	13	1
36	Amirul Waie Ya'acob	(Malaysia)	RM / RW	1	0
37	Amir Safuan	(Malaysia)	RM / RW	1	0
41	Faizzwan Dorahim	(Malaysia)	LW / LM	0	0
Forwards
9	**Vokhid Shodiev**	(Uzbekistan)	ST	10	1
9	Xhevahir Sukaj	(Albania)	ST	4	2
17	Elias	(Brazil)	ST / RW	18	9
20	Khairul Asyraf Sahizah	(Malaysia)	ST	0	0
34	Aidiel Shafiq Aznan	(Malaysia)	ST	0	0

* Games and goals counted for the domestic league only
* Player names in bold denotes player that left mid-season

== Transfers ==
=== In ===
==== December to January ====
Pos	Player	Transferred from
ST	(Albania) Xhevahir Sukaj	(Albania) Partizani Tirana
MF	(Liberia) Erick Weeks Lewis	(Indonesia) Pusamania Borneo
ST	(Brazil) Elias	(South Korea) Busan IPark
ST	(Uzbekistan) Vokhid Shodiev	(Uzbekistan) Bunyodkor
MF	(Malaysia) Fazrul Hazli Kadri	(Malaysia) ATM
DF	(Malaysia) Shahrul Saad	(Malaysia) Felda United
MF	(Malaysia) Azrul Nizam Muhammad	(Malaysia) Harimau Muda
MF	(Malaysia) D. Kenny Pallraj	(Malaysia) Harimau Muda
DF	(Malaysia) Nazirul Naim Che Hashim	(Malaysia) Harimau Muda
GK	(Malaysia) Hafizul Hakim	(Malaysia) Melaka United
ST	(Malaysia) G. Mugenthiran	(Malaysia) Sungai Ara (loan return)
MF	(Malaysia) Fikri Sudin	(Malaysia) Perak youth
ST	(Malaysia) Khairul Asyraf Sahizah	(Malaysia) Perak youth
GK	(Malaysia) Syazani Mat Puat	(Malaysia) Perak youth
DF	(Malaysia) Raffi Nagoorgani	(Malaysia) Perak youth
DF	(Malaysia) Rafiq Faeez Fuad	Unattached

=== In ===
==== June to July ====
Pos	Player	Transferred from
MF	(Uzbekistan) Oybek Kilichev	(Uzbekistan) Pakhtakor Tashkent FK
ST	(Malaysia) Razali Umar Kandasamy	Unattached
DF	(Malaysia) Syahmil Khairi	Unattached
DF	(Malaysia) Tuah Iskandar	(Malaysia) Johor Darul Ta'zim II
DF	(Malaysia) Mohd Irfan Abdul Ghani	(Malaysia) Johor Darul Ta'zim II

=== Out ===
==== December to January ====
Pos	Player	Transferred to
ST	(Brazil) Charles Chad	(Brazil) Associação Desportiva Cabofriense
MF	(Jamaica) Horace James	(Vietnam) SHB Đà Nẵng
ST	(Malaysia) Bobby Gonzales	(Malaysia) Felda United
DF	(Malaysia) Idris Ahmad	(Malaysia) Felda United
DF	(Malaysia) Tuah Iskandar Jamaluddin	(Malaysia) Johor Darul Ta'zim II
GK	(Malaysia) Azizon Abdul Kadir	(Malaysia) Perlis
DF	(Malaysia) Azmizi Azmi	(Malaysia) Perlis
DF	(Malaysia) Sumardi Hajalan	(Malaysia) Perlis
ST	(Malaysia) G. Mugenthiran	(Malaysia) PKNP
GK	(Malaysia) Hairol Fazreen Abu Hassan	(Malaysia) PKNP
MF	(Malaysia) Hamizul Izaidi Zulkifli	(Malaysia) PKNP
DF	(Malaysia) S. Vikneswaren	(Malaysia) PKNP
ST	(South Korea) Namkung Woong	Unattached
ST	(Malaysia) Haris Safwan Kamal	(Malaysia) Terengganu City

==== June to July ====
Pos	Player	Transferred to
MF	(Liberia) Erick Weeks Lewis	(Indonesia) Madura United
MF	(Uzbekistan) Vokhid Shodiev	(Uzbekistan) Qizilqum Zarafshon

== Coaching staff ==
Position	Staff
Manager	(Malaysia) Jamal Mohd Aris
Technical director	(Germany) Karl-Heinz Weigang
Head of Youth Development	(Germany) Karl-Heinz Weigang
Head coach	(Germany) Karl-Heinz Weigang
Assistant coach 1	(Malaysia) Syamsul Saad
Assistant coach 2	(Malaysia) Mohd Shahril Nizam Khalil
Coach	(Malaysia) Mohd Syahman Zainuddin
Goalkeeping coach	(Malaysia) Abdul Talib Saidi
Fitness coach	(Malaysia) Sam Pakiaraj a/l Victor Davaraj
Physiotherapist	(Malaysia) Mohd Nor Adam Mohd Azam (Malaysia) Sulaiman Amri
Sport Masseur	(Malaysia) Lokman Adil Ihsan
Team Assistant	(Malaysia) Ahmad Helmi Ahmad Jamal
U21 General Manager	(Malaysia) Zainal Anuar Abdul Rashid
U21 Head Team Coach	(Malaysia) Sayuddin Mohd Isa
U21 Assistant Coach	(Malaysia) Chung Chee Wai
U21 Goalkeeping Coach	(Malaysia) Abdul Talib Saidi
U21 Physiotherapist	(Malaysia) Muhammad Hamizan Sabri
U19 Head Team Coach	(Malaysia) Khairul Azuar Kamiron
U19 Assistant Coach	(Malaysia) Ayub Abdul Samad
U19 Goalkeeping Coach	(Malaysia) Ramli Talib
U19 Physiotherapist	(Malaysia) Sulaiman Amri

== Club officials ==
Under new management, the Presidency was taken over by the Secretary General State of Perak, Yang Berhormat Dato' Abdul Puhat Mat Nayan on 4 October 2015.

=== Administrative staff ===
- President: YB Dato' Abdul Puhat Mat Nayan
- Deputy President: Dato' Shahrul Zaman Yahya
- Vice President 1: Datuk Rasidi Ibrahim
- Vice President 2: Datuk Muhammad Yadzan Mohammad
- Vice President 3: Datuk G. Irudianathan
- Treasurer: Khairul Azwan Dato' Harun
- Executive Committee Members 1: Reduan Amir Hamzah
- Executive Committee Members 2: Mahhadee Ramlee
- Executive Committee Members 3: Mohd Rizairi Jamaludin
- Executive Committee Members 4: Zainal Anuar Abdul Rashid
- Executive Committee Members 5: Mohd Jamil Zakaria
- Executive Committee Members 6: Abdul Jamil Othman
- Executive Committee Members 7: Johari Baharom
- Executive Committee Members 8: Jurij Jamaludin
- Executive Committee Members 9: Najib Mokhtar

== Competitions ==
=== Super League ===
==== League table ====
Pos	Team	Pld	W	D	L	GF	GA	GD	Pts
4	Kelantan	22	7	8	7	37	33	+4	29
5	Selangor	22	7	7	8	28	27	+1	28
6	Perak	22	7	7	8	29	30	−1	28
7	T–Team	22	7	6	9	30	34	−4	27
8	Sarawak	22	6	6	10	32	40	−8	24

Source: SPMB Football Association of Malaysia, Football Malaysia LLP
Rules for classification: 1) Points; 2) Goal difference; 3) Number of goals scored; 3) Number of goals against.

==== Matches ====
Win Draw Loss

13 February 2016 1	Perak	0–0	Kelantan	Ipoh, Perak
21:00 UTC+8		Report		Stadium: Perak Stadium; Attendance: 21,000; Referee: Mohd Zamzaidi Katimin

16 February 2016 2	Perak	0–1	Selangor	Ipoh, Perak
21:00 UTC+8		Report	Wleh 7' (pen.)	Stadium: Perak Stadium; Attendance: 17,300; Referee: Mohd Zohri Tajuddin

27 February 2016 3	Perak	0–0	Kedah	Ipoh, Perak
21:00 UTC+8		Report		Stadium: Perak Stadium; Attendance: 20,600; Referee: Wan Mohd Tarmizi Wan Ibrahim

1 March 2016 4	Penang	1–1	Perak	George Town, Penang
21:00 UTC+8	Saha 20'	Report	Shahrul 45+1'	Stadium: Bandaraya Stadium; Attendance: 9,279; Referee: Ku Alauddin Ku Muhammad

13 March 2016 5	Perak	0–0	T–Team	Ipoh, Perak
21:00 UTC+8		Report		Stadium: Perak Stadium; Attendance: 7,400; Referee: Khairul Azuan Kidam

5 April 2016 6	Johor Darul Ta'zim	2–1	Perak	Johor Bahru, Johor
20:45 UTC+08:00	Lucero 48' (pen.), 53'	Report	Elias 18'	Stadium: Larkin Stadium; Attendance: 20,357; Referee: S. Sittharajan

9 April 2016 7	Perak	3–4	Pahang	Ipoh, Perak
20:45 UTC+08:00	Shodiev 9'; Elias 58'; Khairil 77'	Report	Volaš 14', 43', 90+2'; Pacheco 70'	Stadium: Perak Stadium; Attendance: 6,670; Referee: Suresh Jayaraman

19 April 2016 8	Terengganu	2–3	Perak	Kuala Terengganu, Terengganu
20:45 UTC+08:00	Nakajima-Farran 28' (pen.), 86'	Report	Fazrul 25'; Elias 54' (pen.), 64'	Stadium: Sultan Mizan Zainal Abidin Stadium; Attendance: 4,300; Referee: Syed Azhar Syed Kamar

24 April 2016 9	Perak	3–2	Felda United	Ipoh, Perak
20:45 UTC+08:00	Firdaus 12'; Elias 7', 81'	Report	Forkey Doe 23', 33'	Stadium: Perak Stadium; Attendance: 7,120; Referee: Fitri Maskon

4 May 2016 10	PDRM	2–2	Perak	Malacca
21:00 UTC+08:00	Muhammad Shafiq Jamal 60'; Mohd Lot Abu Hassan 87'	Report	Mohd Fazrul Hazli Mohd Kadri 3'; Nazirul Naim Che Hashim 90+4'	Stadium: Hang Jebat Stadium; Attendance: 300; Referee: Razlan Jeffri Ali

18 May 2016 11	Sarawak	3–2	Perak	Kuching, Sarawak
20:45UTC+08:00	Ndumba Makeche 10'; Gilmar Jose da Silva Filho 49'; Thiago Junior Aquino 81' (o.g.)	Report	Mohd Fazrul Hazli Mohd Kadri 25'; Elias Fernandes de Oliveira 71'	Stadium: Sarawak State Stadium; Attendance: 1,670; Referee: Suresh Jayaraman

21 May 2016 12	Perak	0–3	Sarawak	Ipoh, Perak
20:45 UTC+08:00		Report	Juninho 32' (pen.); Makeche 65'; Gilmar 70'	Stadium: Perak Stadium; Attendance: 1,700; Referee: Razlan Jeffri Ali

16 July 2016 13	Felda United	2–1	Perak	Jengka, Pahang
20:45 UTC+08:00	Turaev 24'; Zah Rahan 28'	Report	Fazrul 86'	Stadium: Tun Abdul Razak Stadium; Attendance: 3,651; Referee: Suhaimi Mat Hassan

23 July 2016 14	Perak	2–0	Terengganu	Ipoh, Perak
20:45 UTC+08:00	Kenny Pallraj 27'; Elias 78'	Report		Stadium: Perak Stadium; Attendance: 3,117; Referee: Zulkifli Ahmad

26 July 2016 15	Pahang	1–2	Perak	Kuantan, Pahang
20:45 UTC+08:00	Jailton 32'	Report	Xhevahir 29', 76'	Stadium: Darul Makmur Stadium; Attendance: 2,501; Referee: Suresh Jayaraman

3 August 2016 16	Perak	1–0	PDRM	Ipoh, Perak
20:45 UTC+08:00	Fazrul 48'	Report		Stadium: Perak Stadium; Attendance: 7,100; Referee: Mohd Nafeez Abdul Wahab

6 August 2016 17	Perak	0–1	Johor Darul Ta'zim	Ipoh, Perak
20:45 UTC+08:00		Report	Díaz 16'	Stadium: Perak Stadium; Attendance: 26,000; Referee: Khairul Azuan Kidam

16 August 2016 18	T–Team	0–0	Perak	Kuala Terengganu, Terengganu
20:45 UTC+08:00		Report		Stadium: Sultan Ismail Nasiruddin Shah Stadium; Attendance: 1,007; Referee: Suresh Jayaraman

24 August 2016 19	Perak	4–1	Penang	Ipoh, Perak
20:45 UTC+08:00	Pallraj 27'; Fazrul 39'; Ridzuan 69'; Elias 81'	Report	Martins 56'	Stadium: Perak Stadium; Attendance: 3,680; Referee: Teoh Hee Loon

10 September 2016 20	Kedah	3–1	Perak	Alor Setar, Kedah
20:45 UTC+08:00	Smeltz 7', 59'; Thiago 85'	Report	Thiago Junio 82'	Stadium: Darul Aman Stadium; Attendance: 16,500; Referee: Suhaimi Mat Hassan

24 September 2016 21	Selangor	0–1	Perak	Shah Alam, Selangor
20:45 UTC+08:00		Report	Ukah 48' (o.g.)	Stadium: Shah Alam Stadium; Attendance: 3,295; Referee: Mohd Nafeez Abdul Wahab

22 October 2016 22	Kelantan	2–2	Perak	Kota Bharu, Kelantan
20:45 UTC+08:00	Ilijoski 38', 90+4'	Report	Shahrul 53'; Fazrul 67'	Stadium: Sultan Muhammad IV Stadium; Attendance: 2,506; Referee: Fitri Maskon

=== FA Cup ===
Win Draw Loss

Knockout stage

20 February 2016 Round of 32	Perak	3–1 (a.e.t.)	Sarawak	Ipoh, Perak
21:00 (UTC+8)	Thiago 84'; Firdaus 91'; Khairil 119'	Report	Partiban 17'	Stadium: Perak Stadium; Attendance: 8,400; Referee: Syed Azhar Syed Kamar

5 March 2016 Round of 16	Perak	1–0	Kuantan	Ipoh, Perak
21:00 (UTC+8)	Shodiev 3'	Report		Stadium: Perak Stadium; Attendance: 10,170; Referee: Zulkifli Ahmad

Quarter-finals

19 March 2016 First Leg	Perak	1–0	Kuala Lumpur	Ipoh, Perak
21:00 (UTC+8)	Helmi 7' (o.g.)	Report		Stadium: Perak Stadium; Attendance: 7,800; Referee: Zamzaidi Katimin

1 April 2016 Second Leg	Kuala Lumpur	0–1 (0–2 agg.)	Perak	Selayang, Selangor
21:00 (UTC+8)		Report	Nurridzuan 41'	Stadium: Selayang Stadium; Attendance: 6,200; Referee: Saiful Md Radzali

Semi-finals

15 April 2016 First Leg	PKNS	2–2	Perak	Malacca
21:00 (UTC+8)	Guerra 48', 71'	Report	Nurridzuan 58' Thiago 90+3'	Stadium: Hang Jebat Stadium; Attendance: 1,088; Referee: Khairul Azuan Kidam

30 April 2016 Second Leg	Perak	1–2 (3–4 agg.)	PKNS	Ipoh, Perak
21:00 (UTC+8)	Firdaus 48'	Report	Hadwa 7' Cobelli 69'	Stadium: Perak Stadium; Attendance: 27,000; Referee: Zamzaidi Katimin

=== Malaysia Cup ===
==== Group stage ====
Pos	Team	Pld	W	D	L	GF	GA	GD	Pts	Qualification	POL	PKN	PRK	JDT
1	(Malaysia) PDRM	6	3	1	2	8	9	−1	10	Advance to knockout phase	—	0–1	2–1	1–1
2	(Selangor) PKNS	6	2	2	2	8	10	−2	8	Advance to knockout phase	1–2	—	2–1	1–1
3	Perak	6	2	1	3	11	8	+3	7		1–2	4–1	—	3–0
4	Johor Darul Ta'zim	6	1	4	1	9	9	0	7		4–1	2–2	1–1	—

Updated to match(es) played on 20 August 2016. Source: FAM FMLLP

Win Draw Loss

13 July 2016 1	Perak	1–2	PDRM	Perak Stadium, Ipoh
21:00 UTC+8	Xhevahir 22'	Report	de Paula 6' (pen.); Safuwan 49'	Attendance: 5,300; Referee: Syed Azhar Syed Kamar

19 July 2016 2	Perak	4–1	PKNS	Perak Stadium, Ipoh
21:00 UTC+8	Elias 47', 66'; Xhevahir 50'; Fazrul 52'	Report	Soto 89'	Attendance: 2,800; Referee: Mohd Zamzaidi Katimin

30 July 2016 3	Perak	3–0	Johor Darul Ta'zim	Perak Stadium, Ipoh
21:00 UTC+8	Xhevahir 12'; Fazrul 42', 66'	Report		Attendance: 23,000; Referee: Mohd Zamzaidi Katimin

10 August 2016 4	Johor Darul Ta'zim	1–1	Perak	Larkin Stadium, Johor Bahru
21:00 UTC+8	Safiq 15' (pen.)	Report	Kilichev 3'	Attendance: 20,675; Referee: Suhaimi Mat Hassan

13 August 2016 5	PKNS	2–1	Perak	Shah Alam Stadium, Shah Alam
21:00 UTC+8	Cobelli 52'; Jadue 82'	Report	Shahrul 27'	Attendance: 4,658; Referee: Teoh Hee Loon

20 August 2016 6	PDRM	2–1	Perak	Hang Jebat Stadium, Malacca
21:00 UTC+8	de Paula 22'; Fakhrul 58'	Report	Elias 65'	Attendance: 550; Referee: Syed Azhar Syed Kamar

== Statistics ==
=== Top scorers ===
The list is sorted by shirt number when total goals are equal.

Rnk	Pos	No.	Player	Super League	FA Cup	Malaysia Cup	Total
1	FW	17	(Brazil) Elias	9	0	3	12
2	MF	19	(Malaysia) Fazrul Hazli	7	0	3	10
3	FW	9	(Albania) Xhevahir Sukaj	2	0	3	5
4	DF	3	(Malaysia) Shahrul Saad	2	0	1	3
4	DF	26	(Brazil) Thiago Junio	1	2	0	3
4	MF	33	(Malaysia) Firdaus Saiyadi	1	2	0	3
7	FW	9	(Uzbekistan) Vokhid Shodiev	1	1	0	2
7	MF	12	(Malaysia) D. Kenny Pallraj	2	0	0	2
7	MF	16	(Malaysia) Nurridzuan	0	2	0	2
7	MF	35	(Malaysia) Ahmad Khairil Anuar	1	1	0	2
11	MF	11	(Malaysia) Ridzuan Azly Hussham	1	0	0	1
11	DF	21	(Malaysia) Nazirul Naim	1	0	0	1
11	MF	30	(Uzbekistan) Oybek Kilichev	0	0	1	1
#	Own goals			1	1	0	2
Total				29	9	11	49

Last updated: 22 October 2016.
Source: Soccerway
