= 2015 Malaysia Super League =

Liga Super
- Season: 2015
- Dates: 31 January - 22 August 2015
- Champions: Johor Darul Ta'zim; 2nd Super League title 2nd Liga M title
- Relegated: ATM; Sime Darby
- AFC Champions League: Johor Darul Ta'zim (play-off)
- AFC Cup: Johor Darul Ta'zim; Selangor
- Matches: 120
- Goals: 369 (3.08 per match)
- Top goalscorer: Dramane Traore (20 goals)
- Biggest home win: Selangor 4 – 0 LionsXII (18 April 2015)
- Biggest away win: Kelantan 0 – 4 PDRM (21 February 2015)
- Highest scoring: LionsXII 5 – 3 PDRM (7 February 2015); PDRM 3 – 5 Pahang (20 June 2015); Felda United 4 – 4 Selangor (20 June 2015)
- Longest winning run: 7 games Pahang (From Game 6 to Game 12)
- Longest unbeaten run: 10 games Pahang (From Game 6 to Game 16)
- Longest winless run: 8 games Sime Darby (From Game 1 to Game 8)
- Longest losing run: 7 games Sime Darby (From Game 2 to Game 8 )
- Highest attendance: 25,100; Johor Darul Ta'zim; 1–0; Felda United (3 May 2015)
- Lowest attendance: 0 Terengganu; 0–1; Johor Darul Ta'zim (20 Jun 2015)
- Total attendance: 1,224,896
- Average attendance: 9,280
- All statistics correct as of 13 August 2015.

The 2015 Liga Super (English: 2015 Super League) is the 12th season of the Liga Super, the top-tier professional football league in Malaysia.

The season was held from 31 January and concluded in 22 August 2015.

The Liga Super champions for 2015 was Johor Darul Ta'zim.

== Team changes ==
The following teams have changed division.

=== To Malaysia Super League ===
Promoted from Premier League

- PDRM
- Felda United

=== From Malaysia Super League ===
Relegated to Premier League

- T–Team
- PKNS

== Teams ==
A total of 12 teams compete in the 2015 season which includes the top 10 teams that participated in the 2014 season and champions and runners-up of the 2014 Liga Premier.

T-Team and PKNS were relegated at the end of the 2014 Liga Super season after finishing in the bottom place of the league table.

2014 Liga Premier unbeaten champions PDRM and runners-up Felda United secured direct promotion to the Liga Super.

Team	Team Based	Stadium	Capacity^{1}
ATM	Seremban	Tuanku Abdul Rahman Stadium	40,000
Felda United	Selayang	Selayang Stadium	11,098
Johor Darul Ta'zim	Johor Bahru	Larkin Stadium	30,000
Kelantan	Kota Bharu	Sultan Mohammad IV Stadium	22,000
LionsXII	Singapore	Jalan Besar Stadium	8,000
Pahang	Kuantan	Darul Makmur Stadium	40,000
PDRM	Shah Alam	Shah Alam Stadium	80,372
Perak	Ipoh	Perak Stadium	42,500
Sarawak	Kuching	Sarawak Stadium	26,000
Selangor	Shah Alam	Shah Alam Stadium	80,372
Sime Darby	Shah Alam	Selayang Stadium	11,098
Terengganu	Kuala Terengganu	Sultan Mizan Zainal Abidin Stadium^{2}	50,000

- ^{1} Correct as of end of 2014 Liga Super season
- ^{2} Terengganu uses the Sultan Ismail Nasiruddin Shah Stadium until the end of April 2015 due to renovation work being done at Sultan Mizan Zainal Abidin Stadium, subject pending installation of flood light.

=== Stadiums and locations ===
Locations of teams in the 2015 Liga Super

=== Personnel and sponsoring ===
Note: Flags indicate national team as has been defined under FIFA eligibility rules. Players may hold more than one non-FIFA nationality.

Team	Head coach	Captain	Kit manufacturer	Shirt sponsor
ATM	(Malaysia) Azhar Abdullah	(Malaysia) Hairuddin Omar	Warrix Sports	Eco Bumi
Felda United	(Malaysia) Irfan Bakti	(Malaysia) Shukor Adan	Puma	FELDA & KPF
Johor Darul Ta'zim	(Argentina) Mario Gómez	(Malaysia) Safiq Rahim	Nike	Country Garden
Kelantan	(Malaysia) Zahasmi Ismail	(Malaysia) Badhri Radzi	Warriors	Chengal Jati & Kicap Adabi
LionsXII	(Singapore) Fandi Ahmad	(Singapore) Izwan Mahbud	Nike	Starhub
Pahang	(Malaysia) Zainal Abidin Hassan	(Malaysia) Razman Roslan	Puma	Aras Kuasa (home), Resorts World (away)
PDRM	(Malaysia) Mohd Fauzi Pilus	(Malaysia) Muslim Ahmad	Line 7	Perkasa Jauhari
Perak	(Malaysia) M. Karathu	(Malaysia) Nasir Basharudin	Al- Ikhsan	Perak Agro & Casuarina Hotels
Sarawak	(Malaysia) K. Rajagopal	(Malaysia) Joseph Kalang Tie	Starsport	Sarawak Energy
Selangor	(Australia) Mehmet Durakovic	(Malaysia) Shahrom Kalam	Kappa	Menteri Besar Incorporated
Sime Darby	(Malaysia) Ismail Zakaria	(Serbia) Ivan Dragičević	Kappa	Sime Darby
Terengganu	(Malaysia) Ahmad Yusoff	(Malaysia) Nordin Alias	Umbro	Ladang Rakyat

=== Coaching changes ===
Team	Outgoing Head Coach	Manner of departure	Date of vacancy	Incoming Head Coach	Date of appointment
Perak	(Malaysia) Abu Bakar Fadzim	Demotion to assistant head coach	16 September 2014	(Croatia) Vjeran Simunic	16 September 2014
Perak	(Croatia) Vjeran Simunic	Contract terminated	1 January 2015	(Malaysia) M. Karathu	1 January 2015

=== Foreign players ===
Club	Visa 1	Visa 2	Visa 3	Visa 4 (Asian)	Former
ATM	(Nigeria) Obinna Nwaneri	(Nigeria) Abdulafees Abdulsalam	(Honduras) Jerry Palacios	(Australia) Mario Karlovic	-
Felda United	(Serbia) Bojan Miladinovic	(Liberia) Zah Rahan Krangar	(Brazil) Thiago Augusto	(Australia) Ndumba Makeche	(Liberia) Edward Junior Wilson
Johor Darul Takzim	(Brazil) Marcos Antônio	(Argentina) Patito Rodríguez	(Argentina) Luciano Figueroa	(Singapore) Hariss Harun	(Argentina) Jorge Pereyra Díaz (Sierra Leone) Alhaji Kamara
Kelantan	(Brazil) Gilmar	(Nigeria) Austin Amutu	(Colombia) Erwin Carrillo	(Australia) Jonathan McKain	(Liberia) Isaac Pupo (Cameroon) Emmanuel Kenmogne
LionsXII	NA	NA	NA	NA	NA
Pahang	(Jamaica) Damion Stewart	(Argentina) Matías Conti	(Nigeria) Dickson Nwakaeme	(Pakistan) Zesh Rahman	-
PDRM	(Portugal) Jaime Bragança	(The Gambia) Mohamadou Sumareh	(Mali) Dramane Traoré	(Maldives) Ali Ashfaq	(Nigeria) Onorionde Kughegbe
Perak	(Brazil) Thiago Junio	(Jamaica) Horace James	(Brazil) Charles Chad	(South Korea) Namkung Woong	(Brazil) Marco Tulio
Sarawak	(Liberia) Patrick Gerhardt	(Montenegro) Ivan Fatić	(Republic of Ireland) Billy Mehmet	(Australia) Ryan Griffiths	(Netherlands) Ronald Hikspoors
Selangor	(Australia) Robert Cornthwaite	(Brazil) Leandro Dos Santos	(Brazil) Guilherme de Paula	(Indonesia) Andik Vermansyah	-
Sime Darby	(Serbia) Ivan Dragicevic	(Serbia) Marko Perovic	(Serbia) Nemanja Vidakovic	(Australia) Reinaldo Mineiro	(Uzbekistan) Dilshod Sharofetdinov
Terengganu	(Cameroon) Vincent Bikana	(Argentina) Gustavo López	(Brazil) Paulo Rangel	(Canada) (Japan) Issey Nakajima-Farran	(Lebanon) Hassan Chaito

== League table ==
Pos	Team	Pld	W	D	L	GF	GA	GD	Pts	Qualification or relegation
1	Johor Darul Ta'zim (C)	22	14	4	4	36	18	+18	46	Qualification to AFC Champions League qualifying preliminary round 2
2	Selangor	22	11	6	5	43	28	+15	39	Qualification to AFC Cup group stage (Note: Since Lions XII, who won the 2015 Piala FA, are a side managed by the Football Association of Singapore and thus ineligible to represent Malaysia in continental competition, the 2015 Liga Super runners-up will be chosen to represent Malaysia in the AFC Cup.)
3	Pahang	22	13	5	4	43	29	+14	38 (Note: Pahang was docked 6 points due to involvement in the delay in the process of solving the problem of salary and compensation by the former imports season 2013, Mohamed Borji.)	
4	Terengganu	22	12	2	8	40	33	+7	38	
5	Felda United	22	10	6	6	36	26	+10	36	
6	PDRM	22	11	2	9	42	39	+3	35	
7	LionsXII (Note: LionsXII are not eligible for any AFC competition spots)	22	9	6	7	36	32	+4	33	End of MOU saw club dissolved at the end of the season.
8	Perak	22	8	4	10	32	33	−1	28	
9	Kelantan	22	8	4	10	34	38	−4	28	
10	Sarawak	22	4	7	11	28	40	−12	19	
11	ATM (R)	22	2	5	15	21	47	−26	11	Qualification to the Relegation play-off
12	Sime Darby (R)	22	1	7	14	20	48	−28	10	Relegation to Liga Premier

Source: FAM Official Site, Astro Arena
Rules for classification: 1) points; 2) goal difference; 3) number of goals scored
(C) Champions; (R) Relegated

== Results ==
Home \ Away	ATM	FEL	JDT	KEL	LNS	PHG	PRK	PDRM	SWK	SEL	SDA	TRG
ATM		0–4	0–1	0–2	1–1	1–0	0–2	3–1	1–1	1–3	1–1	1–5
Felda United	2–1		2–1	0–0	0–0	0–1	1–4	3–2	3–3	4–4	2–2	1–0
Johor Darul Ta'zim	2–1	1–0		3–1	1–0	2–0	4–1	2–1	2–1	3–1	4–0	2–0
Kelantan	5–1	0–1	4–1		2–0	0–2	1–0	0–4	4–3	2–1	2–2	1–2
LionsXII	3–1	2–1	0–0	3–0		4–2	2–1	5–3	1–0	1–1	3–0	1–1
Pahang	2–0	2–2	1–1	5–3	3–2		1–0	1–0	3–1	1–1	2–0	3–2
Perak	2–1	0–2	2–1	0–0	2–2	1–1		1–3	3–1	0–2	2–0	2–3
PDRM	3–2	1–0	1–0	1–3	2–1	3–5	3–2		1–0	1–4	1–1	3–1
Sarawak	1–1	0–2	0–2	3–2	2–1	0–0	1–1	2–3		1–1	2–1	3–1
Selangor	3–2	1–0	1–1	3–0	4–0	1–3	1–2	1–1	2–0		3–2	2–0
Sime Darby	1–0	0–3	1–1	1–1	1–2	2–4	1–3	1–4	1–1	1–3		0–2
Terengganu	2–2	1–3	0–1	2–1	4–2	3–1	2–1	1–0	4–2	2–0	2–1	

Updated to match(es) played on 22 August 2015. Source: Liga Super 1, Liga Super 2
Legend: Blue = home team win; Yellow = draw; Red = away team win.

== Season statistics ==
=== Top scorers ===
Rank	Player	Club	Goals
1	(Mali) Dramane Traore	PDRM	20
2	(Liberia) Patrick Ronaldinho Wleh	PKNS	16
3	(Argentina) Matias Conti	Pahang	12
3	(Argentina) Luciano Figueroa	Johor Darul Ta'zim	12
4	(Maldives) Ali Ashfaq	PDRM	10
4	(Republic of Ireland) Billy Mehmet	Sarawak	10
6	(Brazil) Chad Souza	Perak	9
6	(South Korea) Namkung Woong	Perak	9
6	(Nigeria) Dickson Nwakaeme	Pahang	9
6	(Canada) Issey Nakajima-Farran	Terengganu	9
10	(Brazil) Paulo Rangel	Terengganu	8
10	(Singapore) Faris Ramli	LionsXII	8
10	(Malaysia) Afiq Azmi	Selangor	8
10	(Brazil) Guilherme de Paula	Selangor	8

=== Hat-tricks ===
Player	Club	Against	Result	Date
(Mali) Dramane Traore	PDRM	LionsXII	3 – 5	7 February 2015
(Brazil) Charles Chad	Perak	Felda United	1 – 4	4 April 2015
(Malaysia) Mohd Afiq Azmi	Selangor	LionsXII	4 – 0	18 April 2015
(Argentina) Matías Conti	Pahang	PDRM	3 – 5	20 June 2015

=== Clean sheets ===
Rank	Player	Club	Clean sheets
1	(Malaysia) Farizal Marlias	Johor Darul Ta'zim	9
2	(Malaysia) Khairul Azhan Khalid	Pahang	7
3	(Malaysia) Khairul Fahmi Che Mat	Kelantan	5
4	(Malaysia) Mohd Zamir Selamat	Perak	3
4	(Malaysia) Badrulzaman Abdul Halim	PDRM	3
5	(Malaysia) Sharbinee Allawee	Terengganu	1
5	(Malaysia) Mohd Fairul Azwan Shahrullai	Felda United	1
5	(Malaysia) Mohd Farizal Harun	Felda United	1
5	(Singapore) Izwan Mahbud	LionsXII	1
5	(Malaysia) Mohd Fadzley Rahim	Sarawak	1

=== Scoring ===
- First goal of the season: Marcos António for Johor Darul Ta'zim against Pahang (37th minutes, 21:12 UTC+8) (31 January 2015)
- Fastest goal of the season: 17 seconds (Ahmad Fakri Saarani); Kelantan 1–2 Terengganu (8 August 2015)
- Fastest hat-trick of the season: 15 minutes (Afiq Azmi); Selangor 4–0 LionsXII (18 April 2015)
- Largest winning margin: 4 goals
  - Selangor 4 – 0 LionsXII (18 April 2015)
- Highest scoring game: 8 goals
  - LionsXII 5–3 PDRM (7 February 2015)
  - PDRM 3–5 Pahang (20 June 2015)
  - Felda United 4–4 Selangor (20 June 2015)
  - Pahang 5–3 Kelantan (12 August 2015/)
- Most goals scored in a match by a single team: 5 goals
  - LionsXII 5–3 PDRM (7 February 2015)
  - PDRM 3–5 Pahang (20 June 2015)
  - Pahang 5–3 Kelantan (12 August 2015)
- Most goals scored in a match by a losing team: 3 goals
  - LionsXII 5–3 PDRM (7 February 2015)

== Awards ==
=== Monthly awards ===
The player of the month award will be given monthly. It were given by Professional Footballers Association of Malaysia (PFAM) starting May 2015. Five players will be pick each month by PFAM and will be shown on their official websites. The player will be voted in a survey and the player with the most vote will be picked as PFAM Player Of The Month.

Month	Player of the Month		Reference
Month	Club	Player	Reference
February	–	–	
March	–	–	
April	–	–	
May	Wan Zaharulnizam	Kelantan	
June	Nurridzuan Abu Hassan	Perak	
July	Luciano Figueroa	Johor Darul Ta'zim	
August	Issey Nakajima-Farran	Terengganu	

== Attendances ==
=== Crowd Attendance for all venues ===
HOME	AWAY												ATTENDANCE	
HOME	ATM	FEL	JDT	KEL	LIONS	PHG	PRK	PDRM	SWK	SEL	SDFC	TRG	TOTAL	AVE
ATM	-----	400	5,200	6,000	400	2,000	1,500	1,050	500	2,500	1,200	2,000	22,750	2,068
Felda United FC	1,223	-----	10,396	2,467	289	3,200	4,525	585	2,573	2,274	400	1,361	29,293	2,663
JDT FC	15,950	25,100	-----	21,100	20,100	21,618	24,920	9,910	19,430	11,340	7,830	6,900	184,198	16,745
Kelantan	8,220	19,000	5,982	-----	18,000	7,000	6,343	19,500	3,872	8,517	8,750	3,512	108,198	9,881
Lions XII	4,086	4,185	7,000	3,587	-----	5,250	3,108	5,288	0	5,814	5,918	5,384	49,620	4,511
Pahang	4,707	11,023	14,758	9,097	6,000	-----	9,689	2,527	4,663	16,500	11,011	17,718	107,693	9,790
Perak TBG	5,500	5,000	20,000	20,000	12,000	6,000	-----	9,000	1,625	7,000	10,000	10,000	106,125	9,648
PDRM	500	800	4,500	2,000	1,000	1,500	2,000	-----	1,000	7,000	1,000	1,000	22,300	2,027
Sarawak	7,111	500	4,350	4,500	2,113	18,988	2,100	2,280	-----	2,150	5,500	10,000	59,592	5,417
Selangor	1,500	3,000	25,000	9,686	9,415	11,223	17,884	2,500	10,000	-----	4,600	4,142	98,950	8,995
Sime Darby FC	300	1,000	4,675	2,250	200	3,985	2,317	400	400	1,733	-----	700	17,960	1,633
Terengganu	5,918	7,000	0	7,330	6,500	17,000	6,200	7,600	300	10,000	8,200	-----	76,048	6,913
	TOTAL LEAGUE CROWD ATTENDANCE												883,225	6,691

Sources: Sistem Pengurusan Maklumat Bolasepak (FAM)

=== By Week ===
2015 Liga Super Attendance
Round	Total	Games	Avg. Per Game
Week 1	55,479	6	9,247
Week 2	51,500	6	8,583
Week 3	84,911	6	14,152
Week 4	65,130	6	10,855
Week 5	50,059	6	8,343
Week 6	39,405	6	6,568
Week 7	42,750	6	7,125
Week 8	54,715	6	9,119
Week 9	38,665	6	6,444
Week 10	66,452	6	11,075
Week 11	48,870	6	8,145
Week 12	54,085	6	9,014
Week 13	57,350	6	9,558
Week 14	62,515	6	10,419
Week 15	50,090	6	8,348
Week 16	69,670	6	11,611
Week 17	60,890	6	10,148
Week 18	43,650	6	7,275
Week 19	49,230	6	8,205
Week 20	56,450	6	9,408
Week 21	67,230	6	11,205
Week 22	55,800	6	9,300
TOTAL	1,224,896	132	9,280

== See also ==
- 2015 Liga Premier
- 2015 Liga FAM
- 2015 Piala FA
- 2015 Piala Presiden
- 2015 Piala Belia
