= Thiago Junio =

Brazilian footballer (born 1984)

Personal information
- Full name: Thiago Junio de Aquino
- Date of birth: 3 April 1984 (age 42)
- Place of birth: Brazil
- Height: 1.87 m (6 ft 2 in)
- Position: Defender

Youth career
- 2001–2004: Atlético Mineiro

Senior career*
Years	Team	Apps	(Gls)
2004–2006	Atlético Mineiro	5	(0)
2004–2005	→ Aalborg BK (loan)	1	(0)
2006	América Mineiro	18	(0)
2007	Gama	10	(0)
2007	Ceara	6	(0)
2007–2008	Gondomar	8	(0)
2009	Ceilândia	3	(0)
2009	Ipatinga	11	(0)
2010	Canoas	15	(0)
2010–2011	São Raimundo (PA)	7	(2)
2012	Noroeste	21	(2)
2012–2013	Nacional (MG)	1	(1)
2014	Đồng Nai	19	(1)
2015–2017	Perak	59	(5)
2018–2019	Felda United	28	(1)

International career
2001	Brazil U17	3	(0)
2015	Malaysia XI	2	(1)
- * Club domestic league appearances and goals

Thiago Junior Aquino (born 3 April 1984), simply known as Thiago Junio is a Brazilian former professional footballer who played as a defender.

== Club career ==
After playing for Brazil U17 in 2001 FIFA World Youth Championship, he signed for Atlético Mineiro in 2001. He spent the following season on loan at Danish Superliga club with Aalborg BK. Making 5 appearances for Atlético Mineiro, he signed for América Mineiro. In the following seasons, he continued to play in lower divisions of club football.

He entered Portuguese football with Gondomar in 2007. However the stint was brief as in the following year he returned home to Brazil. He again tried his luck with various clubs in the lower division. In 2014, entered Asian football by signing for Đồng Nai of Vietnam. He joined his current club, Perak FA, a team in Malaysia Super League in December 2014.

While in Malaysia, he also was selected in a Malaysia League XI team, composed of Super League and Premier League players, in a friendly against visiting clubs Tottenham Hotspur F.C. and Liverpool F.C in May 2015. He scored the only goal for Malaysia XI against Tottenham Hotspur in a 1–2 loss for Malaysia XI.

== Career statistics ==
=== Club ===
As of 10 April 2018

Appearances and goals by club, season and competition
Club	Season	League			National cup		League cup		Continental		Total	
Club	Season	Division	Apps	Goals	Apps	Goals	Apps	Goals	Apps	Goals	Apps	Goals
Perak	2015	Liga Super	16	2	1	0	6	0	–		18	2
Perak	2016	Liga Super	21	1	2	2	7	0	–		30	3
Perak	2017	Liga Super	22	2	2	0	9	1	–		33	3
Perak	Total		59	5	5	2	22	1	0	0	81	8
Felda United	2018	Liga Premier	5	1	2	0	0	0	–		7	1
Career total			64	6	7	2	22	1	0	0	88	9
