= Dramane Traoré =

Malian footballer

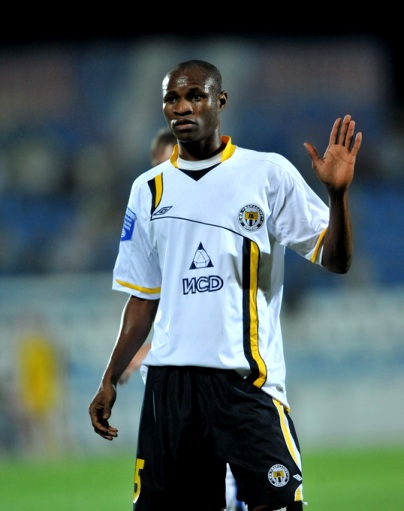
- Traoré in 2011

Personal information
- Full name: Dramane Ridha Dridi Traoré
- Date of birth: 17 June 1982 (age 44)
- Place of birth: Bamako, Mali
- Height: 1.92 m (6 ft 4 in)
- Position: Forward

Senior career*
Years	Team	Apps	(Gls)
1999–2000	Stade Malien	12	(9)
2001–2002	Djoliba AC	19	(12)
2002–2004	Ismaily SC	16	(12)
2004–2006	Club Africain	35	(19)
2006–2010	Lokomotiv Moscow	72	(12)
2009	→ Kuban Krasnodar (loan)	27	(8)
2011	Espérance	12	(6)
2011–2013	Metalurh Donetsk	49	(14)
2013–14	Dubai CSC	18	(8)
2015	PDRM	15	(20)
2016	Kelantan	11	(3)
2016–2017	FC Pune City	12	(0)
Total		298	(123)

International career
2006–2010	Mali	30	(7)
- * Club domestic league appearances and goals

Dramane Traoré (born 17 June 1982) is a Malian former professional footballer who played as a forward. He made 30 appearances scoring 7 goals for the Mali national team.

== International career ==
Traoré was a regular for the Mali national team. He was part of Mali's 2004 Olympic football team, which exited in the quarter finals, finishing top of group A, but losing to Italy in the next round. In 2007, he scored a last minute winner against Togo in the Africa Cup of Nations 2008 qualifier.

== Honours ==
Lokomotiv Moscow

- Russian Cup: 2006–07

Espérance de Tunis

- Tunisian Ligue Professionnelle 1: 2010–11
- Tunisian Cup: 2010–11

Individual

- Malaysia Super League Golden Boots Award: 2015
