= Namkung Woong =

South Korean footballer

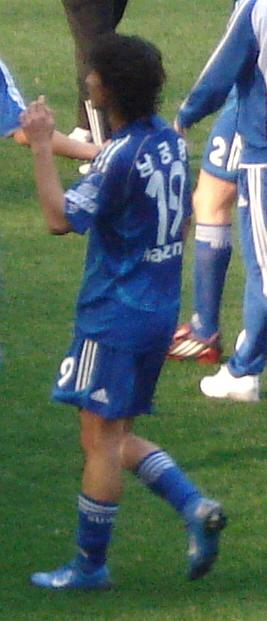

Personal information
- Date of birth: 29 March 1984 (age 42)
- Place of birth: Seoul, South Korea
- Height: 1.81 m (5 ft 11 in)
- Position: Attacking midfielder

Senior career*
Years	Team	Apps	(Gls)
2003–2010	Suwon Bluewings	44	(12)
2005–2006	→ Gwangju Sangmu (army)	43	(20)
2011–2012	Seongnam Ilhwa	35	(16)
2013–2014	Gangwon FC	21	(7)
2014	Kedah FA	27	(30)
2015	Perak FA	27	(23)

International career^{‡}
2002–2003	South Korea U-20	8	(0)
2006	South Korea	1	(0)
- * Club domestic league appearances and goals as of May 09, 2014 ‡ National team caps and goals as of May 09, 2014

- Namkung Woong
- Hangul: 남궁웅
- Hanja: 南宮雄
- RR: Namgung Ung
- MR: Namgung Ung

Namkung Woong (Korean: 남궁웅; born 29 March 1984) is a South Korean football coach and former football player who formerly played for Suwon Bluewings, Seongnam Ilhwa Chunma, Gangwon FC in the K League as well as stints in Malaysia with Kedah FA and Perak FA.

His brother Namkung Do is also a footballer.

Between 2019 and 2022, he was assistant manager at Seongnam FC.

== Club career statistics ==
Club performance			League		Cup		League Cup		Continental		Total	
Season	Club	League	Apps	Goals	Apps	Goals	Apps	Goals	Apps	Goals	Apps	Goals
South Korea			League		FA cup		League Cup		Asia		Total	
2003	Suwon Bluewings	K-League	22	1	0	0	-		-		22	1
2004	Suwon Bluewings	K-League	5	0	0	0	0	0	-		5	0
2005	Gwangju Sangmu	K-League	23	0	0	0	6	0	-		29	0
2006	Gwangju Sangmu	K-League	20	0	1	0	10	0	-		31	0
2006	Suwon Bluewings	K-League	1	0	0	0	0	0	-		1	0
2007	Suwon Bluewings	K-League	6	0	0	0	3	1	-		9	1
2008	Suwon Bluewings	K-League	11	0	1	0	4	0	-		16	0
2009	Suwon Bluewings	K-League	0	0	0	0	0	0	0	0	0	0
2010	Suwon Bluewings	K-League	0	0	0	0	0	0	0	0	0	0
2011	Seongnam Ilhwa Chunma	K-League	5	0	1	0	0	0	-		6	0
2012	Seongnam Ilhwa Chunma	K-League	30	0	2	0	-		6	0	38	0
2013	Gangwon F.C.	K-League	22	0	0	0	0	0	-		22	0
Total	South Korea		145	1	5	0	23	1	6	0	179	2
2014	Kedah FA	Malaysia Premier League	17	7	0	0	10	3	-		27	10
2015	Perak FA	Malaysia Super League	17	9	4	2	6	1	-		27	12
Total	Malaysia		34	16	4	2	16	4	0	0	54	22
Career total			179	17	9	2	39	5	6	0	232	24

== Honors ==
Seongnam Ilhwa Chunma

- 2011 FA Cup Winner
- 2015 Malaysian Super League all-star
