= Nurridzuan Abu Hassan =

Malaysian footballer

Nurridzuan
Personal information
- Full name: Muhammad Nurridzuan bin Abu Hassan Saari
- Date of birth: 20 April 1992 (age 34)
- Place of birth: Perak, Malaysia
- Height: 1.70 m (5 ft 7 in)
- Position: Attacking midfielder

Team information
- Current team: Melaka United
- Number: 3

Youth career
- 2010–2012: Perak U-21

Senior career*
Years	Team	Apps	(Gls)
2011–2012	Perak	15	(0)
2012–2014	Harimau Muda A	25	(3)
2015–2016	Perak	23	(4)
2017	Pahang	7	(0)
2017–2018	PKNS FC	3	(1)
2018–2019	Selangor	6	(0)
2020–	Melaka United	0	(0)

International career^{‡}
2012–2013	Malaysia U-21	3	(0)
2012–2015	Malaysia U-23	8	(1)
2015–	Malaysia	0	(0)
- * Club domestic league appearances and goals as of 05 May 2019 ‡ National team caps and goals as of 25 September 2017

Muhammad Nurridzuan bin Abu Hassan Saari is a Malaysian professional footballer who plays as an attacking midfielder for Malaysia Super League club Selangor. He is known for his free-kick ability.

== Club career ==
Nurridzuan began his career at Perak President Cup team setup in 2010. In the following year, he has been promoted into Perak first team and made 15 appearances during his season debut.

In 2012, Nurridzuan was not listed in the Perak's first team and only played for Perak President Cup team. As captain of the youth team, he led the team to the 2012 President Cup championship, scoring 7 goals in the competition including the winning goal in the final against Betaria FC. As a result, Nurridzuan once again were drafted into the first team for the rest of the season.

In 2012, Perak President Cup team played in the 2012 Sukma Games football tournament in Pahang, where Nurridzuan and the team achieved silver medal when they were defeated 3–0 in the final by Sabah after extra time.

In November 2012, Nurridzuan was offered to join Harimau Muda A team, the Malaysian national under-21 team at the time playing in S.League, along with his Perak teammate D. Kenny Pallraj starting 2013 season and the Perak Football Association agreed to release both players to Harimau Muda A. After spent 2 years playing for Harimau Muda side, Nurridzuan returned to Perak for the 2015 season.

In December 2016, Nurridzuan left Perak and signed a contract with Pahang. It was announced by Sports representative agency MVP Sports Agency on their social media. He spent only a season with Pahang, before joining PKNS FC in December 2017, for the 2018 season.

Nurridzuan left PKNS after his contract expired in November 2018. In December, he signed a deal with Selangor, which had the option of being extended depending on his performance for the club.

== International career ==
Due to his good performances in the President Cup team, Nurridzuan, along with his Perak teammate D. Kenny Pallraj was called by Harimau Muda A head coach Ong Kim Swee to join the Harimau Muda A squad for the 2012 VFF Cup friendly tournament. He made his debut for the national under-21 squad in the tournament and was instrumental in helping the team win the tournament, supplying the assist for the winning goal by Hazwan Bakri in the final in a 1–0 win over Vietnam U-21.

== Career statistics ==
=== Club ===
As of 28 July 2018

Appearances and goals by club, season and competition
Club	Season	League			Cup		League Cup		Continental^{1}		Total	
Club	Season	Division	Apps	Goals	Apps	Goals	Apps	Goals	Apps	Goals	Apps	Goals
Perak	2015	Malaysia Super League	0	6	0	0	0	0	–		23	6
Perak	2016	Malaysia Super League	4	0	5	2	0	0	–		0	2
Perak	Total		0	0	0	0	0	0	0	0	0	0
Pahang	2017	Malaysia Super League	7	0	2	0	2	0	–		11	0
Pahang	Total		7	0	2	0	2	0	–		11	0
PKNS	2018	Malaysia Super League	3	1	2	1	0	0	–		5	2
PKNS	Total		3	1	2	1	0	0	0	0	5	2
Selangor	2019	Malaysia Super League	0	0	0	0	0	0	–		0	0
Selangor	Total		0	0	0	0	0	0	0	0	0	0
Career Total			0	0	0	0	0	0	0	0	0	0

^{1} Includes AFC Cup and AFC Champions League.

== Honours ==
=== Club ===
Pahang

- Malaysia FA Cup: Runner-up 2017

=== Individual ===
- PFAM Player of the Month: June 2015
