= Elias (footballer, born 1992) =

Brazilian footballer

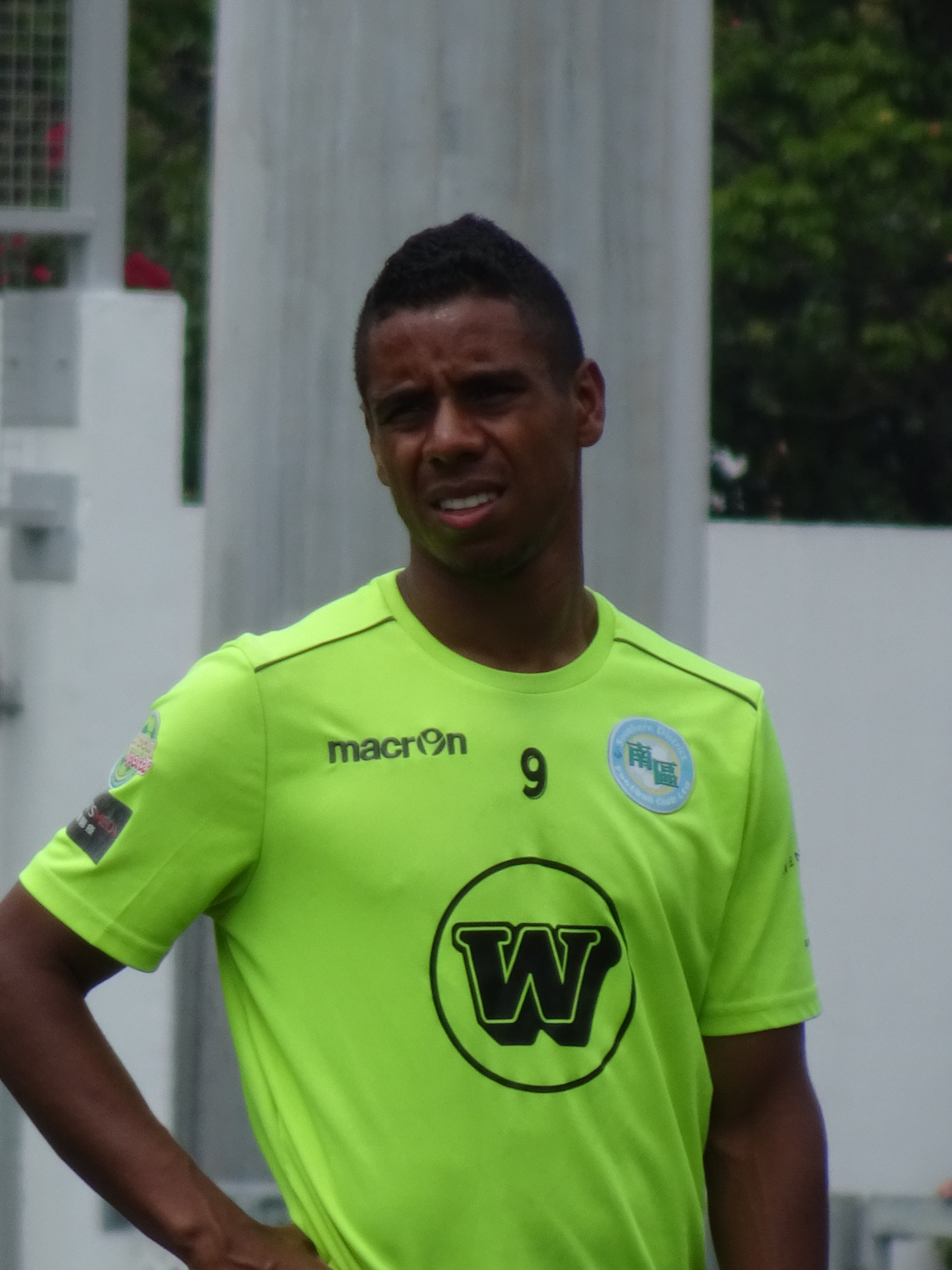

Personal information
- Full name: Elias Fernandes de Oliveira
- Date of birth: 22 May 1992 (age 34)
- Place of birth: São Bernardo do Campo, Brazil
- Height: 1.75 m (5 ft 9 in)
- Position: Winger

Team information
- Current team: Udon United

Senior career*
Years	Team	Apps	(Gls)
2009–2014	Corinthians	4	(0)
2012	→ Paraná (loan)	10	(3)
2014	→ Bangu (loan)	5	(1)
2015	Busan IPark	7	(0)
2016	Perak	18	(9)
2017	São Caetano	9	(1)
2018	Southern	6	(0)
2019	Taubaté	7	(0)
2019–2021	Juventus da Mooca	3	(0)
2021–2022	Customs United	28	(11)
2023	Pattaya United	1	(0)
2023–2024	Phrae United	16	(3)
2023–2024	→ Kanchanaburi Power (loan)	11	(3)
2024	Persijap Jepara	12	(1)
2025	Sitra Club		
2025	Pattaya United	9	(1)
2026–	Udon United	0	(0)
- * Club domestic league appearances and goals as of 7 December 2025

Elias Fernandes de Oliveira (born 22 May 1992), simply known as Elias, is a Brazilian professional footballer who plays as a winger for Thai League 3 club Udon United.

== Career ==
On 16 January 2018, Hong Kong club Southern announced that they had signed Elias.

== Honours ==
=== Club ===
Pattaya Dolphins United

- Thai League 3 Eastern Region: 2022–23
