= Zamir Selamat =

Malaysian footballer

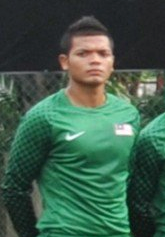

Personal information
- Full name: Muhammad Zamir bin Selamat
- Date of birth: 9 June 1989 (age 37)
- Place of birth: Kuala Lumpur, Malaysia
- Height: 1.80 m (5 ft 11 in)
- Position: Goalkeeper

Youth career
- 2006–2007: Kuala Lumpur President's Cup Team

Senior career*
Years	Team	Apps	(Gls)
2008–2009	Harimau Muda		
2009–2012	Harimau Muda A		
2012–2013	Johor Darul Ta'zim		
2014	PKNS	10	(0)
2015–2016	Perak	21	(0)
2017	PKNS	11	(0)
2018	Melaka United	9	(0)
2019	Batu Dua	5	(0)
2019	Penang	14	(0)
2020	Kuala Lumpur City		
2021	→ UiTM (loan)	9	(0)
2022	Perak		

International career^{‡}
2008–2010	Malaysia U-21		
2009–2012	Malaysia U-23		
2015–	Malaysia	1	(0)
- * Club domestic league appearances and goals as of September 8, 2022 ‡ National team caps and goals as of January 24, 2017

Muhammad Zamir bin Selamat (born 9 June 1989) is a Malaysian footballer who plays as a goalkeeper.

Zamir previously played for Harimau Muda, Johor Darul Ta'zim, PKNS and Perak.

== Club career ==
=== PKNS ===
Zamir rejoined PKNS at the end of 2016 after his contract with Perak expired. On 4 February 2017, Zamir made his first appearance for the club in a 5–3 win over Selangor in Malaysia Super League match. He has made 11 league appearances for the club before been released at the end of the season.

=== Melaka United ===
On 15 November 2017, Zamir signed a one-year contract with Malaysia Super League club Melaka United. Zamir made his debut on 3 February 2018 in 2–1 win over Kelantan at Hang Jebat Stadium.

=== Kuala Lumpur ===
He signed for Kuala Lumpur for the 2020–2021 season.

=== UiTM (Loan) ===
On 25 July 2021, he made his first appearance for UiTM against Johor Darul Ta'zim. They lose 3–1. He made a good impression in that game.

== International career ==
Zamir was called up by Malaysia 2009 coach K. Rajagobal for various upcoming tournaments such as the Ho Chi Minh City Cup, the 2010 Asian Games and the 2010 AFF Suzuki Cup.

Zamir was one of the players that participate in the Slovak Tour for Harimau Muda A on 5 September 2010 until 9 November 2010.

== Career statistics ==
=== Club ===
As of match played 8 September 2021

Appearances and goals by club, season and competition
Club	Season	League			Cup		League Cup		Continental		Total	
Club	Season	Division	Apps	Goals	Apps	Goals	Apps	Goals	Apps	Goals	Apps	Goals
Perak	2015	Malaysia Super League	0	0	0	0	0	0	—		0	0
Perak	2016	Malaysia Super League	0	0	0	0	0	0	—		0	0
Perak	Total		0	0	0	0	0	0	—		0	0
PKNS	2017	Malaysia Super League	11	0	1	0	3	0	—		14	0
PKNS	Total		11	0	1	0	3	0	—		14	0
Melaka United	2018	Malaysia Super League	9	0	1	0	1	0	—		11	0
Melaka United	Total		9	0	1	0	1	0	—		11	0
Penang	2019	Malaysia Premier League	8	0	0	0	6	0	—		14	0
Penang	Total		8	0	0	0	6	0	—		14	0
Kuala Lumpur City	2020	Malaysia Premier League	11	0	0	0	0	0	—		11	0
Kuala Lumpur City	Total		11	0	0	0	0	0	—		11	0
UiTM (loan)	2021	Malaysia Super League	8	0	0	0	0	0	—		8	0
UiTM (loan)	Total		8	0	0	0	0	0	—		8	0
Career total			0	0	0	0	0	0	0	0	0	0
