= Ivan Dragičević =

Serbian footballer

Ivan Dragićević
Personal information
- Full name: Ivan Dragićević
- Date of birth: October 21, 1981 (age 45)
- Place of birth: Pančevo, SFR Yugoslavia
- Height: 1.81 m (5 ft 11 in)
- Position: Left back

Senior career*
Years	Team	Apps	(Gls)
2001–2002	Dinamo Pančevo	21	(0)
2002–2003	Mogren	22	(0)
2003	Budućnost Banatski Dvor	1	(0)
2004	Napredak Kruševac	2	(0)
2004–2005	INON	31	(2)
2005–2006	PSK Pančevo	16	(1)
2006–2007	BASK	25	(1)
2007	Smederevo		
2008	Shirin Faraz	22	(1)
2008–2009	Damash Gilan	19	(1)
2009–2010	Damash Iranian	8	(1)
2011	Jagodina	8	(2)
2011	Napredak Kruševac	9	(1)
2012	Jagodina	0	(0)
2013	Radnički Niš	9	(0)
2013	KA Akureyri	20	(3)
2014	Borac Banja Luka	3	(0)
2014–2015	Mogren	8	(0)
2015–2016	Sime Darby	1	(0)
- * Club domestic league appearances and goals as of 26 March 2018

Ivan Dragićević (Serbian Cyrillic: Иван Драгићевић; born 21 October 1981) is a Serbian retired football defender.

Dragićević has played for FK Dinamo Pančevo, FK Mogren, FK Budućnost Banatski Dvor, FK Smederevo, Shirin Faraz and Damash Gilan in his career.

Many websites are confusing him and the Croatian footballer with same name and born same year, that plays with NK Žepče.

== Career stats ==
Season	Club	League	Apps	Goals	Cup	Apps	Goals
2012/13	(Serbia) FK Radnički Niš	Jelen Super Liga	8	0	Serbian Cup	0	0
