= Marco Túlio (footballer, born 1981) =

Brazilian footballer

Marco Tulio
Personal information
- Full name: Marco Tulio Lopes Silva
- Date of birth: February 28, 1981 (age 45)
- Place of birth: Itabira, Brazil
- Height: 1.73 m (5 ft 8 in)
- Position: Midfielder

Youth career
- Cruzeiro

Senior career*
Years	Team	Apps	(Gls)
1996–1999	Cruzeiro		
2000	Albirex Niigata		
2002–2004	Paulista		
2004–2005	Atlético Sorocaba		
2005–2006	Jorge Wilstermann		
2006	Bragantino		
2006–2007	Debreceni VSC	5	(0)
2007–2008	Kazma		
2008	Atlético Mineiro		
2008–2009	→ Ethnikos Piraeus (loan)		
2009–2010	→ Lokomotiv Mezdra (loan)	3	(0)
2010	Uberlandia	6	(0)
2010–2011	Turan Tovuz	2	(0)
2012	T-Team		
2013	Tarxien Rainbows	9	(1)
2014–2015	Perak FA		
2016–2017	Sabah FA		
- * Club domestic league appearances and goals as of May 14, 2014

Marco Tulio Lopes Silva also known as "Tula" (born February 28, 1981) is a Brazilian footballer who was play as an attacking midfielder.

== Career ==
Marco Túlio previously played for Albirex Niigata in Japan in the J2 League as well as Debreceni VSC in the Hungarian National Championship I, Club Jorge Wilstermann in Bolivia, Kazma in Kuwait, Clube Atlético Mineiro in the Campeonato Brasileiro Série A and for Ethnikos Piraeus in the Greek Beta Ethniki. Tulio Played for PFC Lokomotiv Mezdra in the Bulgarian A PFG in 2009 but left in January 2010 in order to return to Brazil, signing with Uberlandia Esporte Clube.

On 1 March 2012 he signed for T-Team FC in Malaysia. After a season with Malta's Tarxien Rainbows F.C., Tulio was back in Malaysia when he signed for Perak FA in April 2014, as a mid-season foreign player replacement for Kyaw Zayar Win. His debut for Perak on 19 April 2014, in a league game against Terengganu FA, also had him score his first goal for Perak in a 2-0 win.
