= Charles Chad =

Brazilian footballer (born 1981)

Personal information
- Full name: Charles Souza Chad
- Date of birth: 31 December 1981 (age 44)
- Place of birth: Rio de Janeiro, Brazil
- Height: 1.85 m (6 ft 1 in)
- Position: Forward

Team information
- Current team: Macaé

Youth career
- 1999: Madureira
- 2000: Friburguense

Senior career*
Years	Team	Apps	(Gls)
2000–2003	Porto	0	(0)
2000–2002	→ Vilanovense (loan)	24	(4)
2002–2003	→ Machico (loan)		
2004–2005	Friburguense		
2005–2006	Arágua		(11)
2006–2007	Mineros		
2007	Tianjin Teda	14	(1)
2008	Cabofriense		
2008	Ceará	13	(2)
2008–2010	Trofense	24	(2)
2011	Bangu	7	(0)
2011	Campinense	2	(0)
2011–2012	Macaé	1	(2)
2012–2013	Duque de Caxias	20	(5)
2013–2014	Caxias	18	(3)
2014	PDRM FA	24	(8)
2015–2016	Perak FA	9	(9)
2016	Cabofriense	11	(4)
2016	Macaé	2	(1)
2016	Perlis FA	5	(7)
2017–	Macaé	2	(0)
- * Club domestic league appearances and goals as of 16:22, 8 May 2014 (UTC)

Charles Souza Chad (born 31 December 1981) is a Brazilian professional footballer who is currently a play for Macaé. He previously played for Perlis FA as a forward.
