= Norhakim Isa =

Malaysian footballer (born 1993)

Personal information
- Full name: Mohd Norhakim bin Isa
- Date of birth: 24 January 1993 (age 33)
- Place of birth: Perak, Malaysia
- Height: 1.72 m (5 ft 7 1/2 in)
- Position: Midfielder

Youth career
- 2011: Harimau Muda B
- 2012–2013: Perak U21

Senior career*
Years	Team	Apps	(Gls)
2011	Harimau Muda B	11	(0)
2014–2017	Perak	32	(3)
2017	Melaka United	4	(0)
2017–2018	PKNP	12	(1)
2018–2019	Selangor	1	(0)
- * Club domestic league appearances and goals as of 05 May 2019 ‡ National team caps and goals as of 05 May 2019

Mohd Norhakim bin Isa (born 24 January 1993) is a Malaysian footballer who plays as a central midfielder.

== Club career ==
=== Perak ===
Norhakim was who was a product of the Perak youth system. He was promoted to the senior team at the age of 19 after winning the 2012 President's Cup. Having scored three goals in 10 league starts for Perak during 2014 season and helped his side avoid relegation. Despite his relatively young age, he possesses every quality you need in a central midfielder as he is capable of dribbling past defenders, passing the ball with flair, and shooting accurately with his strong left foot.

=== Melaka United ===
On 20 June 2017, during mid season transfer window, Norhakim signed with Melaka United after a number of seasons with Perak. On 4 July 2017, Norhakim made his debut for Melaka United during Malaysia Cup first match in Darul Aman Stadium. On 11 July 2017, Norhakim made his league debut playing against Kedah which the team ended lost 2–4 in their home.

=== PKNP ===
After his contract with Melaka United is become to end, Norhakim switch sides and joined PKNP for a free transfer. He made his debut, playing 56-minutes on 25 February 2018 against Kuala Lumpur in Super League matches, which PKNP won by 2–1. On 26 May 2018, he scored his first goal for the club against his former club, Perak.

=== Selangor ===
On 5 December 2018, Norhakim signed as a free agent for Selangor on a one-year contract, which had the option of being extended depending on his performance for the club.

== Career statistics ==
=== Club ===
As of 1 July 2018

Club	Season	League		Cup		League Cup		Continental		Total	
Club	Season	Apps	Goals	Apps	Goals	Apps	Goals	Apps	Goals	Apps	Goals
Melaka United	2017	4	0	0	0	5	0	–	–	9	0
Melaka United	Total	4	0	0	0	5	0	0	0	9	0
PKNP	2018	18	1	2	0	0	0	–	–	20	1
PKNP	Total	18	1	2	0	0	0	0	0	20	1
Selangor	2019	0	0	0	0	0	0	–	–	0	0
Selangor	Total	0	0	0	0	0	0	0	0	0	0
Career total		18	1	0	0	0	0	0	0	20	1
