= Arif Ismail =

Malaysian footballer

Personal information
- Full name: Muhd Arif bin Ismail
- Date of birth: 7 March 1986 (age 40)
- Place of birth: Ampang, Selangor, Malaysia
- Height: 1.70 m (5 ft 7 in)
- Position: Centre-back

Team information
- Current team: Teck Hin F.C.
- Number: 5

Youth career
- 2004–2006: Kuala Lumpur

Senior career*
Years	Team	Apps	(Gls)
2004–2006	Kuala Lumpur	22	(1)
2007–2009	Negeri Sembilan	18	(0)
2010–2011	Perak	15	(1)
2012–2014	Sime Darby	46	(1)
2015–2017	Perak		
2018–2019	KB MPKJ		
2020–2022	Imigresen		
2023–2024	KSR SAINS		
2025–2026	Teck Hin F.C.		

International career^{‡}
2013	Malaysia	1	(0)
- * Club domestic league appearances and goals ‡ National team caps and goals as of 2 August 2014

Muhd Arif bin Ismail (born 7 March 1986) is a Malaysian professional footballer who plays as a centre-back.

== Club career ==
He began his professional career at his home team of Kuala Lumpur FA. He joined Negeri Sembilan FA in 2007, and his main achievement while at Negeri Sembilan was winning the 2009 Malaysia Cup. In 2010, he joined Perak FA and played for them for two seasons.

He joined Sime Darby F.C. in 2012. His achievement with Sime Darby includes finishing as runners-up in the 2012 Malaysia FA Cup competition, playing in the final as Sime Darby lose to Kelantan FA 1–0.
