= Nasir Basharudin =

Malaysian footballer (born 1990)

Personal information
- Full name: Mohamad Nasir Bin Basharudin
- Date of birth: 29 March 1990 (age 36)
- Place of birth: Taiping, Malaysia
- Height: 1.75 m (5 ft 9 in)

Team information
- Current team: Perak FA
- Number: 4

Youth career
- 2007–2008: UPB-MyTeam
- 2009–2010: Perak

Senior career*
Years	Team	Apps	(Gls)
2010–2019	Perak	89	(7)
2020–2021	Terengganu	18	(0)
2022–2023	Petaling Jaya City		
2023	Harini FT		
2024–2026	Melaka	12	(0)
2026–	Perak FA	0	(0)

International career^{‡}
2013	Malaysia U-23		
2015–	Malaysia	10	(0)
- * Club domestic league appearances and goals as of 26 March 2023 ‡ National team caps and goals as of 10 September 2018

Mohamad Nasir Bin Basharudin (born 29 March 1990) is a Malaysian professional footballer who plays for Melaka Football Club and the Malaysia national team. Nasir mainly plays as a central midfielder but can also play as a defensive midfielder.

== Club career ==
Nasir began his professional career playing for UPB-MyTeam youth team, before move to Perak youth team in 2009. He was in the Perak team that competed in the 2010 Sukma Games. He was released at the end of the 2011 season, but was re-signed in April 2012 to cope with the loss of players through injuries.

Nasir was to become the mainstay in the Perak team in 2013 and 2014 season, after the release of several senior players. In the absence of regular captain Mohammad Hardi Jaafar due to injuries, Nasir has captained the team for several games. After the departure of Hardi, Nasir was appointed as the team captain from the 2015 until 2019.

== International career ==
Nasir has played for Malaysia U-23 team under Ong Kim Swee. He made his debut for the team in the 2013 Merdeka Tournament scored 1 goal in a 3–0 win over Thailand selection team. Nasir was also included in the Malaysia 2013 Southeast Asian Games football squad.

On 16 June 2015, Nasir made his debut as first eleven for the Malaysia senior team in a 0–6 defeat to Palestine.

== Career statistics ==
=== Club ===
As of 28 July 2018

Appearances and goals by club, season and competition
Club	Season	League (Note: Including Malaysia Charity Shield)			Cup		League Cup		Continental (Note: Including AFC Cup and AFC Champions League)		Total	
Club	Season	Division	Apps	Goals	Apps	Goals	Apps	Goals	Apps	Goals	Apps	Goals
Perak	2010	Malaysia Super League	0	0	0	0	0	0	–		0	0
Perak	2011	Malaysia Super League	5	0	0	0	0	0	–		0	0
Perak	2012	Malaysia Super League	0	0	0	0	0	0	–		0	0
Perak	2013	Malaysia Super League	0	0	0	0	0	0	–		0	0
Perak	2014	Malaysia Super League	0	0	0	0	0	1	–		0	1
Perak	2015	Malaysia Super League	0	2	0	1	0	0	–		21	3
Perak	2016	Malaysia Super League	12	0	1	0	??	0	–		0	0
Perak	2017	Malaysia Super League	20	2	1	0	10	0	–		31	2
Perak	2018	Malaysia Super League	18	3	4	1	0	0	–		22	4

=== International ===
As of 10 September 2018

Appearances and goals by national team and year
National team	Year	Apps	Goals
Malaysia	2015	5	0
Malaysia	2017	2	0
Malaysia	2017	3	0
Total		10	0

== Style of play ==
Nasir daily plays as a defensive midfielder for Perak, but can also plays as a defender. He was also used as an attacking midfielder in the Malaysia U-23 squad. Nasir's long shots are his assets for his team, and he can also launch long throw-ins into the opponent's penalty box.

== Personal life ==
Nasir married with TV actress Annie Mosha, in a simple ceremony on 23 January 2023
