= PDRM FA football team =

Malaysian football club

PDRM
- Full name: "Pasukan Bolasepak Polis DiRaja Malaysia"; Royal Malaysian Police Football Association
- Nicknames: "Sang Saka Biru" (The Cops) "Sang Keris Biru" (The Blue Dagger) "Harimau Biru" (The Blue Tiger)
- Short name: PDRM
- Founded: 1990; 36 years ago, as RMPFA or PDRM FA; 2020; 6 years ago, as PDRM FC
- Ground: MP Selayang Stadium
- Capacity: 16,000
- Owner: Royal Malaysian Police Football Association
- President: DIG Dato’ Sri Abdul Aziz bin Abdul Majid
- Head coach: Mohd Asyraf bin M.R. Asri
- League: Malaysia A2 Amateur League
- 2025–26: Malaysia Super League, 13th of 13 (ejected)
Home colours	Away colours

Polis Di-Raja Malaysia Football Association football team or PDRM FA (Malay: Pasukan Bola Sepak Polis Diraja Malaysia) is a Malaysian professional football club associated with the Royal Malaysia Police and owned by PDRM FC Sdn Bhd. The club is based in Selangor Darul Ehsan.

Domestically, the club has won the Malaysia Premier League, the second tier of Malaysian football in 2006–07 and 2014. They also won the People of Maldives Invitational Cup in 2015. The club focused on restructuring its management as decision behind leaving the Malaysia Super League.

== History ==
During 2006–07 season, PDRM won the league title and were promoted to Malaysia Super League in 2007–08. The club managed to keep up in the league as they finished their debut in Malaysia's top flight in seventh position. 2009 was unfortunate for the club; the team failed to stay in the Malaysia Super League as they finished last and were relegated to Malaysia Premier League.

In 2014, the club named Malaysian football legend, Dollah Salleh as their head coach and brought quality foreign and local players to strengthen the squad and made their target to win the Malaysia Premier League once again that year. With much hard work and dedication, PDRM managed to finish at the top of the table and promoted to the Malaysia Super League as the champions of 2014 Malaysia Premier League. Though, Dollah Salleh left the club as Football Association of Malaysia decided to appoint him as the head coach of Malaysia national team and Azman Adnan, who had been the assistant for him during the time took his place. Ali Ashfaq from Maldives, who played a vital on PDRM's road to Super league won the Best Foreign Player Award in Malaysia national football awards in 2014.

The club camped at Hong Kong in late December 2014 and also participated in and won the 2015 People of Maldives Invitational Cup held in the Maldives in January 2015.

In 2015 Malaysia Super League, the club edged the defending champions of Malaysia Super League, Johor Darul Ta'zim and Kelantan in their first games of the league. However, with several problems came up from the squad, they finished the league in 6th position in the first year after promotion in 2014. The Malian striker, Dramane Traore had been the main man scoring the goals for the club in 2015 season. Yet, Ali Ashfaq was nominated among the best three players for the Best Foreign Player Award in 2015.

On 15 January 2016, PDRM camped in Bangkok, Thailand with the new foreign signings, former Johor Darul Ta'zim, Andrezinho and Singaporean international, Safuwan Baharudin.

PDRM was promoted back to the 2023 Malaysia Super League after finishing 6th in the 2022 Malaysia Premier League. This promotion occurred because of the top-tier restructuring from 12 teams to 14 teams (initially planned for 18 teams). Throughout the 2023 season, PDRM was known as the 'Giant Killer', frequently upsetting bigger teams in the league. They managed to hold a 1–0 defeat to 9-time consecutive league champions, Johor Darul Ta'zim, won against Kedah Darul Aman, Selangor, Sabah and fought for a goalless draw against Terengganu.

Before the start of the 2026–27 Malaysia Super League season, PDRM was fined RM45,000 for only partially meeting the requirements to obtain an MFL club license. They were withdrew from the Malaysia Super League after failing to meet the final July 15 deadline.

Crest of PDRM FC (2020–2026)

== Stadium ==
Stadium	Location	Capacity	Year
Tuanku Abdul Rahman Stadium	Paroi, Seremban	45,000	2010, 2012
Shah Alam Stadium	Shah Alam	80,372	2015, 2018
Hang Jebat Stadium	Krubong/Paya Rumput	40,000	2013, 2016–2017, 2019
Kuala Lumpur Stadium	Selayang	18,000	2020–2022
Petaling Jaya Stadium	Petaling Jaya	25,000	2011, 2014, 2023
Selayang Stadium	Selayang	11,098	2019, 2024–2026

== Kit manufacturer and shirt sponsor ==
Period	Kit manufacturer	Shirt sponsor
1990	Line 7	Dunhill; EON Bank
1991–1992	Puma	Dunhill; EON Bank
1993	Line 7	Dunhill; EON Bank
1998	Le Coq Sportif	Dunhill
2002	Antioni	Dunhill
2003–2004	Line 7	Dunhill
2005		TMNet
2005/06	Eutag	TMNet
2006/07	Sukses	celcom, TMNet
2007/08	Kappa	TM
2009	Line 7	TM, Inai Kiara
2010	Line 7	TM
2011	Line 7	no sponsors
2012	Line 7	Al - Jabbar
2013	Line 7	no sponsors
2014	Kappa	Perkasa Jauhari
2015	Line7	Perkasa Jauhari
2016	Line7	Puncak Niaga
2017	Line7	Forca
2018	Line7	ODR Lubricants
2019	Line7	Papa Rich
2020	Al - Sports	redONE
2021–2023	Oren Sports	Top Glove, redONE
2024–25–2025–26	Lotto	redONE

== Players (2025) ==
=== First-team squad ===
Note: Flags indicate national team as defined under FIFA eligibility rules; some limited exceptions apply. Players may hold more than one non-FIFA nationality.

No.	Pos.	Nation	Player
7	MF	MAS	Irfan Fazail
8	FW	NGR	Elisha Kashim
11	FW	CIV	Bernard Doumbia
13	DF	MAS	Badrul Afendy Fadzli
15	MF	KOR	Park Tae-soo (captain)
16	MF	MAS	Syafiq Azmi
17	FW	MAS	Amirul Wa'ie
18	MF	MAS	Adam Farhan Mustaffa
19	DF	MAS	Amir Saiful Badeli
20	GK	MAS	Asri Muhamad
21	MF	MAS	Zazrir Naim
22	MF	MAS	Afiq Saluddin
23	DF	CIV	Noel Agbre

No.	Pos.	Nation	Player
24	MF	MAS	Hafiz A.Aziz
26	DF	MAS	Alif Naquiddin
27	MF	MAS	Imran Samso
28	GK	MAS	Fahmi Ikhwan
29	MF	MAS	Aiman Sufi
30	GK	MAS	Ifwat Akmal
32	MF	MAS	Safiee Ahmad
34	MF	MAS	Eizrul Ashraf
46	GK	MAS	Hakeem Hamidun
47	MF	MAS	Dick Chenny Waili
66	DF	MAS	Fakhrullah Yusoff
77	MF	JOR	Fadi Awad
89	MF	MAS	Fakhrul Azim

== Development squad ==
=== Under-23s ===
As of 1 March 2023

No.	Name	Nat.	Position
Goalkeepers
1	Hakim Hamidun	(Malaysia)	GK
22	Akif Aiman Rosdi	(Malaysia)	GK
31	Ridzuan Azali	(Malaysia)	GK
Defenders
2	Hadi Hasbollah	(Malaysia)	RB, RWB
4	Fakhrullah Yusoff	(Malaysia)	LB, LWB
5	Iqbal Azmi	(Malaysia)	CB
14	Alif Aidil Ghazali	(Malaysia)	CB
33	Haziq Akmal	(Malaysia)	CB, RB
47	Izzat Zuhairie Zakaria	(Malaysia)	LB, LWB
88	Luqman Hakim Draman	(Malaysia)	CB
Midfielders
8	Asyraf Kamal Tajul Ariffin	(Malaysia)	CAM, CM
18	Harsayd Azhar	(Malaysia)	DM, CM
18	Adam Farhan Mustaffa	(Malaysia)	AM, CM
23	Afiq Saluddin	(Malaysia)	DM, CB
24	Jacque Faye	(Senegal)	CM, LW, RW, ST
29	Syahmi Jani	(Malaysia)	CM
Forwards
17	Ismail Ibrahim	(Malaysia)	ST
10	Aliff Hasmardi	(Malaysia)	ST, LW
11	Hariz Zoolhilmi	(Malaysia)	ST
19	Aiman Sufi Radzai	(Malaysia)	LW
28	Haziq Hafiz Hidrus	(Malaysia)	RW
30	Fareez Abdul Samah	(Malaysia)	LW
56	Akif Iqraiz Zuhairi	(Malaysia)	RW
90	Nnbuike Chijoke Chukwu	(Nigeria)	ST
92	Eskandar Ismail	(Malaysia)	RW

=== Under-20s ===
As of 21 March 2023

Fa	Name	Nat.	Position
Goalkeepers
1	Hadif Padil Ali	(Malaysia)	GK
21	Khairul Amar	(Malaysia)	GK
22	Uday Zidane Arifin	(Malaysia)	GK
Defenders
3	Aidil Fikri Khalid	(Malaysia)	RB/RWB
4	Danish Aiman Onn	(Malaysia)	LB/LWB
5	Noor Aidil Zailani	(Malaysia)	CB
19	Farhat Faizal	(Malaysia)	CB
23	Afiq Danish Ridzuan	(Malaysia)	RB/RWB
24	Harith Imran Jumat	(Malaysia)	LB/LWB
26	Haiqal Qawwiy	(Malaysia)	CB
27	Amar Nazmi Aziz	(Malaysia)	CB/DM
28	Amirul Nazruddin	(Malaysia)	RB
Midfielders
6	Noor Adha Zailani	(Malaysia)	DM/CM
7	Haffizi Mustaffa Kamal	(Malaysia)	AM/CM
8	Hadzeq Faudzi	(Malaysia)	LW/LM
12	Akmal Naufal Najib	(Malaysia)	CM
14	Amirul Dzikry Che Ros	(Malaysia)	CM
15	Ameer Nur Iman	(Malaysia)	CM
16	Adam Danielshah	(Malaysia)	LW/LM
17	Hazim Ammar	(Malaysia)	DM/CM
19	Umar Danish Izriya	(Malaysia)	RW/RM
30	Hafizan Zamin	(Malaysia)	RW/LW
Forwards
9	Razan Rosli	(Malaysia)	ST
10	Danish Zikry Zubir	(Malaysia)	ST

== Club officials ==
=== Senior officials ===
Position	Staff
President	(Malaysia) Ayob Khan
Chief executive officer	(Malaysia) Mohamad Hafiz Zainal Abidin
Chief operating officer	(Malaysia) Mohd Shukri Ismail
Chief finance officer	(Malaysia) Mohd Hasrulrizal Shah Hassan
Team manager	(Malaysia) Mohd Zaffarollah Mohd Nordin
Assistant Manager	(Malaysia) Mohd Shamshul Hisham Abd Razak
Legal advisor	(Malaysia) Nazri Saad

=== Coaching staff ===
Position	Name
Head coach	Vacant
Assistant head coach	(Malaysia) Eddy Gapil
Assistant coach	(Malaysia) V. Kavi Chelvan
Goalkeeping coach	(Malaysia) Mohd Atfan Hat
Fitness coach	(Malaysia) Mohamad Azraie Faozi
Team doctor	(Malaysia) Muhamad Dzafri Muhamad Masro
Physiotherapist	
Kitman	(Malaysia) Muhamad Amirul Abas

=== Former coaches ===
Name	Period	Trophy
(Malaysia) Rahim Abdullah	1990–1991	
(England) Kevin Morton	1992	
(England) David Harrison	1993	
(Malaysia) Ismail Ramli	1994	
(Malaysia) Bahwandi Hiralal	1995–1998	
	1999–2000	2000 Malaysia FAM League
(Malaysia) K. Thayananthan	2001	
(Malaysia) Rahim Abdullah	2002	
	2003	
(Malaysia) Mohd Dali Wahid	2004–2006	
(Malaysia) K. Thayanathan	2006–2010	2007 Malaysia Premier League
(Malaysia) T. Kanapathy	2010–2011	
(Malaysia) R. Nalathamby	2011–2013	
(Malaysia) Dollah Salleh	2014	2014 Malaysia Premier League
(Malaysia) Azman Adnan	2014–July 2015	
(Malaysia) Mohd Fauzi Pilus	July 2014 – November 2017	
(Malaysia) Zulhamizan Zakaria	November 2017 – July 2018	
(Malaysia) Mohd Fauzi Pilus	July 2018 – February 2019	
(Malaysia) E. Elavarasan	March 2019 – December 2019	
(Malaysia) Ishak Kunju	January 2020 – December 2020	
(Malaysia) Mat Zan Mat Aris	January 2021 – March 2021	
(Malaysia) Wan Rohaimi Wan Ismail	31 March 2021 – 3 September 2022	
(Malaysia) Razak Jamaadi	3 September 2022 – 12 January 2023	
(Malaysia) Azzmi Aziz	12 January 2023 – 20 June 2023	

== Club record ==
Note

- P = Played, W = Win, D = Draw, L= Loss, F = Goal For, A = Goal Against, Pts = Points, Pos = Position

1st or Champions 2nd or Runner-up 3rd place Promotion Relegation

Season	League									Cup			Other		Asia	
Season	Division	Pld	W	D	L	F	A	Pts	Pos	Charity	Malaysia	FA	Other		Competition	Result
2004	Liga Premier	24	7	7	10	34	44	28	6th	–	Not qualified	3rd round	–	–	–	–
2005	Liga Premier	21	2	3	16	15	51	9	8th	–	Not qualified	1st round	–	–	–	–
2005–06	Liga Premier	21	12	10	8	38	26	46	6th	–	Not qualified	2nd round	–	–	–	–
2006–07	Liga Premier	20	14	2	4	40	25	44	1st	–	Group stage	1st round	–	–	–	–
2007–08	Super League	24	7	3	14	30	52	24	9th	–	Quarter-finals	Round of 32	–	–	–	–
2009	Super League	26	0	3	23	19	75	3	14th	–	Group Stage	Round of 16	–	–	–	–
2010	Liga Premier	22	8	4	10	37	41	28	7th	–	Not qualified	Round of 16	–	–	–	–
2011	Liga Premier	22	12	3	7	36	28	39	3rd	–	Group Stage	Round of 32	–	–	–	–
2012	Liga Premier	22	11	5	6	20	38	38	5th	–	Not qualified	Round of 32	–	–	–	–
2013	Liga Premier	22	7	4	11	41	39	25	7th	–	Not qualified	Round of 32	Trofeo Persija	Group stage	–	–
2014	Liga Premier	22	16	4	2	63	23	52	1st	–	Quarter-finals	Quarter-finals	–	–	–	–
2015	Super League	22	11	2	9	42	39	35	6th	–	Group stage	Round of 16	Pomis Cup	Champions	–	–
2016	Super League	22	5	6	11	21	32	21	11th	–	Semi-finals	Quarter-finals	–	–	–	–
2017	Liga Premier	22	7	4	11	36	41	25	8th	–	Not qualified	2nd round	–	–	–	–
2018	Liga Premier	20	8	5	7	28	31	29	5th	–	Group stage	2nd round	–	–	–	–
2019	Liga Premier	20	9	3	8	30	27	30	4th	–	Group stage	3rd round	–	–	–	–
2020	Super League	11	0	2	9	5	29	−1	12th	–	–	Cancelled	–	–	–	–
2021	Liga Premier	20	7	5	8	22	25	26	8th	–	–	–	–	–	–	–
2022	Liga Premier	18	6	3	9	20	28	21	6th	–	Round of 16	1st round	–	–	–	–

== Individual player awards ==
=== M-League Golden boot winners ===
Season	Player	Goals
2012	(Malaysia) Khairul Izuan Abdullah	27
2015	(Mali) Dramane Traoré	19

=== M-League Top goalscorers ===
Season	Player	Goals
2011	(Malaysia) Khairul Izuan Abdullah	11
2012	(Malaysia) Khairul Izuan Abdullah	27
2013	(Malaysia) Khairul Izuan Abdullah	8
2014	(Maldives) Ali Ashfaq	27
2015	(Mali) Dramane Traoré	20
2016	(Maldives) Ali Ashfaq	5
2017	(Ivory Coast) Dao Bakary	15
2018		
2019	(South Korea) Lee Chang-hoon	10
2020	(Malaysia) Eskandar Ismail	2
2021	(Japan) Bruno Suzuki	7
2022	(Slovakia) Martin Adamec	8

== Records and statistics ==
=== Goalscorers ===
As of 22 January 2016

#	Name	Years	League	Cup	League Cup	Other (Note: Includes POMIS Cup)	Total	Ratio
1	(Malaysia) Khairul Izuan Abdullah	2009–present	47 (71)	0 (0)	0 (0)	0 (0)	47 (71)	0.66
2	(Maldives) Ali Ashfaq	2014–present	27 (37)	2 (5)	9 (12)	3 (4) (Note: All appearances in POMIS Cup)	41 (58)	0.71
3	(Mali) Dramane Traoré	2015	20 (20)	3 (2)	1 (1)	5 (4)	29 (27)	1.07
4	(Brazil) Charles Chad	2014	13 (20)	3 (4)	3 (6)	0 (0)	19 (30)	0.63
5	(Malaysia) Bobby Gonzales	2014	8 (21)	1 (4)	3 (6)	0 (0)	12 (31)	0.39
6	(The Gambia) Muhamed Sumareh	2012–2015	5 (34)	1 (6)	2 (11)	0 (0)	9 (51)	0.18
7	(Malaysia) Fazuan Abdullah	2011	9 (18)	0 (0)	0 (0)	0 (0)	9 (18)	0.5
8	(Malaysia) Muhd Khairul Akhyar Hussain	2013	7 (19)	0 (0)	0 (0)	0 (0)	7 (19)	0.37
9	(Malaysia) Sathya Seelan	2016	1(7)	0 (0)	0 (0)	0 (0)	1(7)	0.14

==== By competition ====
- Most goals scored in all competitions: 47 – (Malaysia) Khairul Izuan Abdullah, 2009–present
- Most goals scored in Malaysia Super League: 20 – (Mali) Dramane Traoré, 2015
- Most goals scored in Malaysia Cup: 9 – (Maldives) Ali Ashfaq, 2014–present
- Most goals scored in FA Cup: 3
  - (Mali) Dramane Traoré, 2015
  - (Brazil) Charles Chad, 2014

==== In a single season ====
- Most goals scored in a season in all competitions: 29 – (Mali) Dramane Traoré, 2015
- Most goals scored in a single Malaysia Super League season: 20 – (Mali) Dramane Traoré, 2015
- Most goals scored in a single Malaysia Cup season: 6 – (Maldives) Ali Ashfaq, 2014
- Most goals scored in a single FA Cup season: 3
  - (Mali) Dramane Traoré, 2015
  - (Brazil) Charles Chad, 2014

== Honours ==
=== League ===
- Malaysia Premier League
  - Winners (2): 2007, 2014
  - Runners-up (1): 2019
- Malaysia FAM League
  - Runners-up (1): 2000

=== Cups ===
- MFL Challenge Cup
  - Winners (1): 2023

=== Others ===
- People's Cup
  - Winners (1): 2015
- Malaysia Premier Futsal League
  - Winners (1): 2004
- eMFL Super League
  - Winners (1): 2023

== Foreign players ==
Year	Player 1	Player 2	Player 3	Player 4	Player 5	Player 6	Player 7	Player 8	Player 9	Former
2013	(The Gambia) Mohamadou Sumareh	(Uganda) Edrisar Kaye								
2014	(The Gambia) Mohamadou Sumareh	(Brazil) Rafael Souza	(Brazil) Charles Chad	(Maldives) Ali Ashfaq						
2015	(The Gambia) Mohamadou Sumareh	(Mali) Dramane Traore	(Portugal) Jaime Bragança	(Maldives) Ali Ashfaq						(Nigeria) Onorionde Kughegbe
2016	(Mali) Souleymane Konaté	(Singapore) Safuwan Baharudin	(Brazil) Andrézinho	(Maldives) Ali Ashfaq						
2017	(Mali) Souleymane Konaté	(Singapore) Safuwan Baharudin	(Singapore) Yasir Hanapi	(Ivory Coast) Dao Bakary						(Ivory Coast) Frederic Pooda
2018	(Montenegro) Argzim Redžović	(Romania) Petrișor Voinea	(Japan) Shunsuke Nakatake	(South Korea) Shim Un-seob						
2019	(Montenegro) Argzim Redžović	(South Korea) Lee Chang-hoon	(Nigeria) Uche Agba							
2020	(Turkmenistan) Serdar Geldiýew	(Turkmenistan) Şöhrat Söýünow	(Grenada) Antonio German							
2021	(Namibia) Lazarus Kaimbi	(Ghana) Alexander Amponsah	(Zimbabwe) Victor Kamhuka	(Japan) Bruno Suzuki						(Argentina) Alvaro Cuello
2022	(Slovakia) Miloš Lačný	(Slovakia) Martin Adamec	(Jordan) Fadi Awad	(Ghana) Alexander Amponsah						(Kyrgyzstan) Mirbek Akhmataliyev (Kyrgyzstan) Mirbek Akhmataliyev
2023	(Myanmar) Kyaw Min Oo	(Spain) Mario Arqués	(Jordan) Fadi Awad	(Japan) Bruno Suzuki	(Nigeria) Uche Agba	(Nigeria) James Okwuosa	(Nigeria) Chukwu Chijioke	(Senegal) Jacque Faye	(Liberia) Marcus Macauley	
2024	(Myanmar) Kyaw Min Oo	(Nigeria) Ifedayo Olusegun	(Jordan) Fadi Awad	(Japan) Bruno Suzuki	(Nigeria) Prince Obus Aggreh	(Nigeria) Chidi Osuchukwu	(Nigeria) Faith Friday Obilor	(Nigeria) Aremu Timothy		

== Affiliated clubs ==
- (Malaysia) Armed Forces F.C.
