= Karl-Heinz Weigang =

German football manager (1935–2017)

Personal information
- Date of birth: 24 August 1935
- Place of birth: Germany
- Date of death: 12 June 2017 (aged 81)

Managerial career
- Years: Team
- 1964–1965: Sri Lanka
- 1966–1968: South Vietnam
- 1970–1973: Mali
- 1974–1975: Ghana
- 1979–1982: Malaysia
- 1982–1986: Cameroon (youth teams)
- 1987–1988: Canon Yaoundé
- 1989–1994: Gabon
- 1995–1997: Vietnam
- 1997–2000: Perak FA
- 2005–2006: Johor FA
- 2016–2017: Perak TBG F.C.

Karl-Heinz Weigang (24 August 1935 – 12 June 2017) was a German professional football manager. He had vast experience in coaching international football, having managed the likes of Sri Lanka, Vietnam, Mali, Ghana and Gabon over a career that spanned more than half a century. However, he is best remembered for his time with Malaysia in the early 1980s, when he led the national team to qualify for the 1980 Olympic Games. He was also a popular figure in the Malaysian league, where he had some domestic success over his multiple stints with Perak, the last being his role as coach and technical advisor in 2016.

== Career ==
As national coach, Weigang guided Malaysia to qualify for the 1980 Moscow Olympic Games as group leaders, although the country eventually boycotted the Games that year in protest of the Soviet invasion of Afghanistan.

He was conferred the FIFA Order of Merit and CAF Order of Merit in 1998 for his contribution towards Asian and African football.

On club level, he guided Perak to win the Malaysia Cup in 1998 and 2000.

== Cultural reference ==
Weigang's role in the 1980 Olympic qualification became the inspiration of the character Harry Mountain (played by Mark Williams) in Ola Bola, a widely acclaimed Malaysian sports film in 2016.

== Death ==
Weigang had a contract with Perak until June 2017, but was "rested" since February as he left for Germany for an eye surgery and a football course. He died of a heart attack there on 12 June 2017, at the age of 81.

== Honours ==
=== Manager ===
South Vietnam

- Merdeka Cup: 1966
- SEAP Games: silver medal 1967

Mali

- African Cup of Nations: runner-up 1972

Malaysia

- SEA Games: Gold medal 1979; silver medal 1981

Vietnam

- SEA Games: silver medal 1995
- AFF Championship: bronze medal 1996

Perak

- Malaysia Cup: 1998, 2000
- Malaysia Charity Shield: 1999

=== Individual ===
- FIFA Order of Merit: 1998
- CAF Order of Merit: 1998

== See also ==
- 1980 Summer Olympics – Men's Asian Qualifiers
