= 2014 Selangor FA season =

2014 season of Malaysian association football club

Selangor FA
2014 season
- Chairman: Abdul Khalid Ibrahim
- Manager: Mehmet Duraković
- Head coach: Mehmet Duraković
- Stadium: 1. Shah Alam Stadium; 2. MBPJ Stadium (interim)
- Malaysia Super League: 2nd
- Malaysia FA Cup: Second round
- Malaysia Cup: Quarter-finals
- AFC Cup: Group stage
- Top goalscorer: League: Paulo Rangel (16); All: Paulo Rangel (29)
- Highest home attendance: 70,000; Super League (24 May 2014); Selangor vs Johor Darul Ta'zim
- Lowest home attendance: 500; AFC Cup (23 April 2014); Selangor vs Maziya S&RC
- Average home league attendance: 15,273
- Biggest win: AFC Cup; 4–1 v Maziya (H) (23 April 2014); Super League; 4–1 v Terengganu (A) (10 June 2014); Super League; 3–0 v Sarawak (H) (21 June 2014)
- Biggest defeat: Malaysia Cup; 0–4 v FELDA United (H) (3 October 2014)
Home colours	Away colours	Third colours

The 2014 Selangor FA Season is Selangor FA's 9th season playing soccer in the Malaysia Super League since its inception in 2004. This was Mehmet Durakovic's first season as manager and coach of the team. He replaced the interim manager, P. Maniam, who in turn had been serving in that capacity after Irfan Bakti Abu Salim resigned in 2013.

Selangor FA began the season on 18 January 2014. They will also compete in three domestic cups; The FA Cup Malaysia, Malaysia Cup and also in an international cup; AFC Cup.

== Kit ==
Supplier: Kappa / Sponsor: Selangor

Home	Away	Third	Goalkeeper

== Players ==
=== First Team Squad ===
No.	Name	Nationality	Position(s)	Since	Signed from
Goalkeepers
1	Syamim Othman	(Malaysia)	GK	2013	Johor Darul Ta'zim
21	Hamsani Ahmad	(Malaysia)	GK	2013	Negeri Sembilan
25	Farizal Marlias	(Malaysia)	GK	2013	Perak
Defenders
2	Shazlan Alias	(Malaysia)	RB	2013	T–Team
3	Azmi Muslim	(Malaysia)	LB / CB	2013	FELDA United
4	Steve Pantelidis	(Australia)	CB / DM	2013	(Australia) Perth Glory
5	Shahrom Kalam	(Malaysia)	CB / DM	2013	Perak
12	Bunyamin Umar	(Malaysia)	CB / RB / DM	2009	UPB-MyTeam
17	Rizal Fahmi	(Malaysia)	CB / RB	2013	Kelantan
18	P. Rajesh	(Malaysia)	RB / LB / CB	2013	PKNS
22	Zaiful Abdul Hakim	(Malaysia)	RB	2013	President's Cup
27	Evaldo	(Brazil)	CB	2014	(Brazil) Villa Nova Atlético Clube
Midfielders
6	Shukur Jusoh	(Malaysia)	CM / AM	2012	Terengganu
7	Andik Vermansyah	(Indonesia)	LW / RW	2013	(Indonesia) Persebaya 1927
8	Nazmi Faiz	(Malaysia)	CM / AM	2014	PKNS
10	Juninho	(Brazil)	CM / AM	2013	(Thailand) TOT
13	Raimi Mohd Nor	(Malaysia)	LW / AM / RW	2012	FELDA United
15	K. Gurusamy	(Malaysia)	DM / CM	2012	Harimau Muda A
16	S. Kunalan	(Malaysia)	LW / RW	2012	Negeri Sembilan
23	S. Veenod	(Malaysia)	DM / CM / RW	2012	USM
24	Fitri Shazwan	(Malaysia)	LW / RW / CM / AM	2006	President's Cup
31	K. Satish	(Malaysia)	CM / AM	2013	President's Cup
Forwards
9	Paulo Rangel	(Brazil)	ST	2013	Perak
11	Hazwan Bakri	(Malaysia)	ST	2013	Harimau Muda A
14	Hadi Yahya	(Malaysia)	ST	2013	Perak
19	Afiq Azmi	(Malaysia)	ST	2012	Kuala Lumpur
20	A. Thamil Arasu	(Malaysia)	ST	2013	Harimau Muda A

== Transfers ==
=== Transfers in ===
Pos.	Name	From
GK	(Malaysia) Farizal Marlias	(Malaysia) Perak
GK	(Malaysia) Hamsani Ahmad	(Malaysia) Negeri Sembilan
GK	(Malaysia) Syamim Othman	(Malaysia) Johor Darul Ta'zim II
DF	(Malaysia) Azmi Muslim	(Malaysia) FELDA United
DF	(Malaysia) Rizal Fahmi	(Malaysia) Kelantan
DF	(Malaysia) Shahrom Kalam	(Malaysia) Perak
DF	(Australia) Steve Pantelidis	(Australia) Perth Glory
DF	(Malaysia) Shazlan Alias	(Malaysia) T–Team
DF	(Malaysia) P. Rajesh	(Malaysia) PKNS
DF	(Brazil) Evaldo	(Brazil) Villa Nova Atlético Clube
MF	(Indonesia) Andik Vermansyah	(Indonesia) Persebaya 1927
MF	(Malaysia) Nazmi Faiz	(Malaysia) PKNS
MF	(Brazil) Juninho	(Thailand) Muangthong United
FW	(Brazil) Paulo Rangel	(Thailand) Muangthong United
FW	(Malaysia) A. Thamil Arasu	(Malaysia) Harimau Muda A
FW	(Malaysia) Hazwan Bakri	(Malaysia) Harimau Muda A
FW	(Malaysia) Hadi Yahya	(Malaysia) Perak

=== Transfers out ===
Pos.	Name	To
GK	(Malaysia) Norazlan Razali	(Malaysia) Johor Darul Ta'zim
GK	(Malaysia) Damien Lim	(Malaysia) Harimau Muda A
GK	(Malaysia) Faiz Khalid	(Malaysia) ATM
GK	(Malaysia) Izzat Rahim	(Malaysia) Putrajaya SPA
GK	(Malaysia) Sharbinee Allawee	(Malaysia) Terengganu
GK	(Malaysia) Aniis Ismail	(Malaysia) FELDA United
DF	(Australia) Adam Griffiths	(Malaysia) Kedah
DF	(Slovakia) Peter Chrappan	(Slovakia) Vion Zlaté Moravce
DF	(Malaysia) Mahali Jasuli	(Malaysia) Johor Darul Ta'zim
DF	(Malaysia) Rafiq Shah	(Malaysia) Sime Darby
DF	(Malaysia) Zain Azraai	(Malaysia) PDRM
DF	(Malaysia) Farid Azmi	(Malaysia) FELDA United
DF	(Malaysia) J. Arvind	(Malaysia) ATM
DF	(Malaysia) Khishan Raj	(Malaysia) ATM
DF	(Malaysia) Faizul Asraf	(Malaysia) Released
DF	(Malaysia) Asraruddin Putra	(Malaysia) Johor Darul Ta'zim
DF	(Malaysia) Fairuz Aziz	(Malaysia) Sime Darby
DF	(Malaysia) Adib Aizuddin	(Malaysia) FELDA United
DF	(Malaysia) Nasriq Baharom	(Malaysia) FELDA United
DF	(Malaysia) Nurfitah Md Shah	(Malaysia) Johor Darul Ta'zim II
DF	(Malaysia) Zaiful Hakim	(Malaysia) PKNS
MF	(Malaysia) Raimi Mohd Nor	(Malaysia) FELDA United (On Loan)
MF	(Malaysia) K. Soley	(Malaysia) FELDA United
MF	(Malaysia) V. Kavi Chelvan	(Malaysia) Negeri Sembilan
MF	(Slovakia) Michal Kubala	(Brunei) Wijaya
MF	(Malaysia) Hardee Shamsuri	(Malaysia) PKNS
MF	(Malaysia) Saiful Hasnol	(Malaysia) Released
MF	(Malaysia) Wan Zulhilmi	(Malaysia) Perlis
MF	(Malaysia) Shukor Azmi	(Malaysia) Perlis
MF	(Malaysia) Hafiz Hassan	(Malaysia) PKNS
MF	(Malaysia) K. Satish	(Malaysia) Harimau Muda A
FW	(Malaysia) Wan Mohd Hoesne	(Malaysia) Sabah
FW	(Liberia) Forkey Doe	(Malaysia) Kelantan
FW	(Malaysia) Amri Yahyah	(Malaysia) Johor Darul Ta'zim
FW	(Malaysia) Ramzul Zahini	(Malaysia) T–Team
FW	(Malaysia) Nazrul Kamaruzaman	(Malaysia) Sime Darby
FW	(Malaysia) Hasnan Awal	(Malaysia) Sime Darby
FW	(Malaysia) Arif Anwar	(Malaysia) Harimau Muda A
FW	(Malaysia) Israq Zakaria	(Malaysia) Released
FW	(Malaysia) Haziq Fikri	(Malaysia) PDRM
FW	(Malaysia) Wong Kah Heng	(Malaysia) Released

== Pre-season and friendlies ==
11 December 2013 Friendly	South Melbourne (Australia)	0–4	(Malaysia) Selangor	Melbourne, Australia
7:00pm		Report	Shukur 8'; Afiq 75', 78'; Kunanlan 88'	Stadium: Lakeside Stadium; Attendance: 100

15 December 2013 Friendly	South Melbourne (Australia)	0–3	(Malaysia) Selangor	Melbourne, Australia
7:00pm		Report	Fitri 25'; Veenod 40'; Afiq 75'	Stadium: Lakeside Stadium; Attendance: 100

31 December 2013 Friendly	Selangor (Malaysia)	2–1	(Malaysia) ATM	Subang, Selangor
16:45 UTC+08:00	Juninho 30'; Rangel 43' (pen.)	Report	Marlon 85' (pen.)	Stadium: TUDM Mini Stadium; Attendance: 55

26 May 2014 Friendly	Selangor (Malaysia)	0–2	(Spain) Sevilla	Shah Alam, Selangor
20:45 UTC+08:00		Report	Trochowski 30'; Figueiras 45'	Stadium: Shah Alam Stadium; Attendance: 4,600; Referee: Nafeez Abd Wahab

21 July 2014 Friendly	Selangor (Malaysia)	1–1	(Malaysia) Kedah	Shah Alam, Selangor
20:45 UTC+08:00	Hazwan 46'	Report	Griffiths 28'	Stadium: SUK Court; Attendance: 2,000

24 July 2014 Friendly	Selangor (Malaysia)	0–1	(Malaysia) Penang	Selayang, Selangor
20:45 UTC+08:00		Report	Lee 59'	Stadium: Majlis Perbandaran Selayang Stadium, Selayang; Attendance: 1,000

== Competitions ==
=== Overview ===
Competition	First match	Last match	Starting round	Final position	Record							
Competition	First match	Last match	Starting round	Final position	Pld	W	D	L	GF	GA	GD	Win %
Malaysia Super League	18 January 2014	25 June 2014	Matchday 1	2nd	22	12	5	5	28	19	+9	54.55
Malaysia FA Cup	22 January 2014	4 February 2014	First round	Second round	2	1	0	1	2	1	+1	50.00
Malaysia Cup	13 August 2014	10 October 2014	Group stage	Quarter-finals	8	3	2	3	10	13	−3	37.50
AFC Cup	25 February 2014	23 April 2014	Group stage	Group stage	6	2	2	2	9	6	+3	33.33
Total					38	18	9	11	49	39	+10	47.37

Last updated: 10 October 2014
Source: Competitions

=== Malaysia Super League ===
==== Table ====
Pos	Team	Pld	W	D	L	GF	GA	GD	Pts	Qualification or relegation
1	Johor Darul Ta'zim	22	13	5	4	39	22	+17	44	2015 AFC Champions League qualifying play-off
2	Selangor	22	12	5	5	28	19	+9	41	
3	Pahang	22	11	4	7	36	30	+6	37	2015 AFC Cup group stage (Note: Qualified as 2014 Piala FA winners)
4	Terengganu	22	10	6	6	38	28	+10	36	
5	Sime Darby	22	9	4	9	32	32	0	31	

Source: RSSSF, FAM Official Site, Astro Arena
Rules for classification: 1) points; 2) goal difference; 3) number of goals scored

==== Results summary ====
Overall								Home						Away					
Pld	W	D	L	GF	GA	GD	Pts	W	D	L	GF	GA	GD	W	D	L	GF	GA	GD
22	12	5	5	28	19	+9	41	7	2	2	12	5	+7	5	3	3	16	14	+2

Source: Super League fixtures and results

==== Results by matchday ====
Round	1	2	3	4	5	6	7	8	9	10	11	12	13	14	15	16	17	18	19	20	21	22
Ground	H	A	H	A	A	H	A	H	A	H	A	H	A	H	A	H	H	A	H	A	H	A
Result	W	L	W	W	L	D	D	W	W	D	W	W	D	W	W	W	L	W	L	L	W	D
Position	3	2	2	1	4	4	5	2	2	3	3	2	2	2	1	1	1	1	2	2	2	2

Source: Super League fixtures and results
A = Away; H = Home; W = Win; D = Draw; L = Loss

==== League Matches ====
Win Draw Loss

18 January 2014 1	Selangor	2–0	T–Team	Kelana Jaya, Selangor
16:45 UTC+08:00	Rangel 65', 72'; Rizal (yellow card) 56'; Gurusamy (yellow card) 90+4'	Report	Fábio (yellow card) 22'; Azrul (yellow card) 41'; Hattaphon (yellow card) 47'; Faizal (yellow card) 69'	Stadium: Petaling Jaya Stadium; Attendance: 5,000; Referee: Zamzaidi Katimin

25 January 2014 2	LionsXII (Singapore)	2–1	Selangor	Kallang, Singapore
19:45 UTC+08:00	Shakir (yellow card) 4' (goal) 44'; Safuwan (yellow card) 40'; Faritz (yellow card) 84'; Khairul 90+5' (yellow card) 90+6'	Report	Kunanlan (yellow card) 30'; Fitri 58'	Stadium: Jalan Besar Stadium; Attendance: 6,108; Referee: Nagor Amir Noor Mohamed

28 January 2014 3	Selangor	1–0	Pahang	Kelana Jaya, Selangor
16:45 UTC+08:00	Rangel 56'; Juninho (yellow card) 75'	Report	Saiful Nizam (yellow card) 30'; Stewart (yellow card) 61'	Stadium: Petaling Jaya Stadium; Attendance: 5,000; Referee: Zohri Tajuddin

8 February 2014 4	Sime Darby	1–2	Selangor	Selayang, Selangor
20:45 UTC+08:00	Failee 2' (yellow card) 13'; Sharofetdinov (yellow card) 43'; Fairuz (yellow card) 72'	Report	Rangel 40', 85'	Stadium: Majlis Perbandaran Selayang Stadium; Attendance: 6,000; Referee: Suhaizi Shukri

15 February 2014 5	Johor Darul Ta'zim	4–1	Selangor	Larkin, Johor
20:45 UTC+08:00	Baihakki 13' (yellow card) 45+2'; Hariss 34'; Nurul Azwan (yellow card) 52'; Figueroa 53'; Fadhli 60'	Report	Kunanlan (yellow card) 65'; Rangel 77' (pen.); Shukur (yellow card) 80'; Bunyamin (yellow card) 90+1'	Stadium: Tan Sri Dato Haji Hassan Yunos Stadium; Attendance: 25,000; Referee: Nazmi Nasaruddin

15 March 2014 6	ATM	1–1	Selangor	Selayang, Selangor
20:45 UTC+08:00	Arostegui 45+1' (yellow card) 79'; Affize (yellow card) 45+2'; Venice (yellow card) 81'	Report	Rangel 3' (yellow card) 45+2'; Gurusamy (yellow card) 67'; Veenod (yellow card) 80'	Stadium: Majlis Perbandaran Selayang Stadium; Attendance: 5,000; Referee: Zamzaidi Katimin

22 March 2014 7	Selangor	1–0	Kelantan	Shah Alam, Selangor
20:45 UTC+08:00	Rangel 22' (pen.) (yellow card) 60'; Fitri (yellow card) 90'	Report	Tuan Faim (yellow card) 21'; Nik Shahrul (yellow card) 69'; Tengku Hasbullah (yellow card) 70'	Stadium: Shah Alam Stadium; Attendance: 17,000; Referee: Nafeez Abd Wahab

25 March 2014 8	Sarawak	0–2	Selangor	Kuching, Sarawak
20:45 UTC+08:00	Gyepes (yellow card) 69'; Ramesh (yellow card) 83'	Report	Andik 25'; Thamil (yellow card) 38' (goal) 52'; Rangel (yellow card) 90+1'	Stadium: Sarawak Stadium; Attendance: 22,000; Referee: Zohri Tajuddin

29 March 2014 9	Selangor	2–2	PKNS	Shah Alam, Selangor
20:45 UTC+08:00	Veenod (yellow card) 14'; Helmi 21' (o.g.); Afiq 75'; Pantelidis (yellow card) 77'	Report	Aminudddin 23', 73' (yellow card) 45'; Nazmi (yellow card) 45' (yellow-red card) 68'; Wleh (yellow card) 90+2'	Stadium: Shah Alam Stadium; Attendance: 8,000; Referee: Amirul Izwan Yaacob

5 April 2014 10	Perak	0–1	Selangor	Ipoh, Perak
20:45 UTC+08:00	Tuah (yellow card) 83'; Shahrizal (red card) 88'	Report	Rangel 22' (pen.)	Stadium: Perak Stadium; Attendance: 7,900; Referee: Syed Azhar Syed Kamar

8 April 2014 11	T–Team	1–1	Selangor	Kuala Terengganu, Terengganu
20:45 UTC+08:00	Wanggai 81' (red card) 90+3'	Report	Thamil 15' (yellow card) 90+3'; Kunanlan (yellow card) 36'; Veenod (yellow card) 71'	Stadium: Sultan Ismail Nasiruddin Shah Stadium; Attendance: 1,000; Referee: Fairuzi Mat Desa

12 April 2014 12	Selangor	1–0	Perak	Shah Alam, Selangor
20:45 UTC+08:00	Rangel 9'; Pantelidis (yellow card) 12'; Evaldo (red card) 45+1'	Report	Syazwan (yellow card) 16'; Hassan (yellow card) 42'; Raffi (yellow card) 52' (yellow-red card) 66'; Hardi (yellow card) 71'	Stadium: Shah Alam Stadium; Attendance: 10,000; Referee: Zulkifli Ahmad

19 April 2014 13	Selangor	1–0	(Singapore) LionsXII	Shah Alam, Selangor
20:45 UTC+08:00	Pantelidis 24'; Rangel (yellow card) 90+1'	Report	Raihan (yellow card) 44'; Zulfahmi (yellow card) 64'; Shakir (yellow card) 64'	Stadium: Shah Alam Stadium; Attendance: 12,000; Referee: Nafeez Abd Wahab

4 May 2014 14	Selangor	0–0	Terengganu	Shah Alam, Selangor
20:45 UTC+08:00		Report	Nordin (yellow card) 44'; Ismail Faruqi (yellow card) 45+1'	Stadium: Shah Alam Stadium; Attendance: 15,000; Referee: Syed Azhar Syed Kamar

10 May 2014 15	Pahang	0–1	Selangor	Kuantan, Pahang
20:45 UTC+08:00	Razman (yellow card) 68'	Report	Shahrom (yellow card) 17'; Andik 65'; Farizal (yellow card) 88'	Stadium: Darulmakmur Stadium; Attendance: 32,000; Referee: Samsudin Ibrahim

17 May 2014 16	Selangor	1–0	Sime Darby	Shah Alam, Selangor
20:45 UTC+08:00	Rangel 38' (pen.) (yellow card) 84'	Report	Yosri (yellow card) 37'; Sharofetdinov (yellow card) 74'; Fahrul (yellow card) 90+3'	Stadium: Shah Alam Stadium; Attendance: 9,000; Referee: Azman Jamaluddin

24 May 2014 17	Selangor	0–1	Johor Darul Ta'zim	Shah Alam, Selangor
20:45 UTC+08:00	Shahrom (yellow card) 16'; Pantelidis (yellow card) 27'	Report	Shakir (yellow card) 5'; Daudsu (yellow card) 8'; Figueroa 71'; Marcos (yellow card) 90+4'	Stadium: Shah Alam Stadium; Attendance: 70,000; Referee: Samsudin Ibrahim

10 June 2014 18	Terengganu	1–4	Selangor	Kuala Terengganu, Terengganu
20:45 UTC+08:00	Dabo 52'; Zairo (yellow card) 65'	Report	Rangel 45+2' (red card) 45+4'; Hadi 48' (pen.); Andik (yellow card) 61'; Farizal (yellow card) 78'; Veenod 89'; Kunanlan 90+2'	Stadium: Sultan Ismail Nasiruddin Shah Stadium; Attendance: 11,000; Referee: Nafeez Abd Wahab

13 June 2014 19	Selangor	0–2	ATM	Shah Alam, Selangor
20:45 UTC+08:00	Hadi (yellow card) 13'; Veenod (yellow card) 56'	Report	Arostegui 27' (pen.) 65'; Riduwan (yellow card) 42'; Fauzi (yellow card) 53'	Stadium: Shah Alam Stadium; Attendance: 9,000; Referee: Nagor Amir Noor Mohamed

17 June 2014 20	Kelantan	2–0	Selangor	Kota Bharu, Kelantan
20:45 UTC+08:00	Forkey Doe 22'; Zairul (yellow card) 63'; Hussein (yellow card) 82'; Zaharulnizam (yellow card) 70' (goal) 85'	Report	Thamil (yellow card) 57'; Veenod (yellow card) 61'; Nazmi (yellow card) 84'	Stadium: Sultan Mohammad IV Stadium; Attendance: 3,000; Referee: Syed Azhar Syed Kamar

21 June 2014 21	Selangor	3–0	Sarawak	Shah Alam, Selangor
20:45 UTC+08:00	Rangel 42', 61'; Pantelidis (yellow card) 45+2'; Hazwan 65'; Shukur (yellow card) 70'	Report	Mazwandi (yellow card) 45+1'	Stadium: Shah Alam Stadium; Attendance: 8,000; Referee: Zamzaidi Katimin

25 June 2014 22	PKNS	2–2	Selangor	Shah Alam, Selangor
20:45 UTC+08:00	Helmi (yellow card) 51'; Patrick 66'; Kim 82' (pen.)	Report	Rangel 22', 68'; Kunanlan (yellow card) 35'; Shukur (yellow card) 81'	Stadium: Shah Alam Stadium; Attendance: 6,000; Referee: Zamzaidi Katimin

==== Results overview ====
Win Draw Loss

Team	Home score	Away score	Double
ATM	0–2	1–1	1–3
Johor Darul Ta'zim	0–1	1–4	1–5
Kelantan	1–0	0–2	1–2
(Singapore) LionsXII	1–0	1–2	2–2
Pahang	1–0	1–0	2–0
Perak	1–0	1–0	2–0
PKNS	2–2	2–2	4–4
Sarawak	3–0	2–0	5–0
Sime Darby	1–0	2–1	3–1
T–Team	2–0	1–1	3–1
Terengganu	0–0	4–1	4–1

=== FA Cup ===
22 January 2014 First Round	Harimau Muda C	0–2	Selangor	Petaling Jaya, Selangor
16:15 UTC+08:00	Sanjev (yellow card) 90+2'	Report	Rangel 51'; Juninho 72'	Stadium: MBPJ Stadium; Attendance: 2,000; Referee: Sukri Abdul Rahman

4 February 2014 Second Round	Selangor	0–1	Sarawak	Petaling Jaya, Selangor
16:00 UTC+08:00	Bunyamin (yellow card) 45+1'	Report	Zamri 33'; Gyepes (yellow card) 52'; Eldstål (yellow card) 54'; Sani (red card) 61'	Stadium: MBPJ Stadium; Attendance: 6,000; Referee: Fairuzi Mat Desa

=== Malaysia Cup ===
Selangor joined the competition in the group stage.

==== Group stage ====
Group D

Team	Pld	W	D	L	GF	GA	GD	Pts	(Malaysia) PDRM	(Selangor) SEL	(Kuala Lumpur) SDA	(Terengganu) TTM
(Malaysia) PDRM (A)	6	5	1	0	15	4	+11	16		1–1	3–1	4–1
Selangor (A)	6	3	1	2	7	6	+1	10	0–2		1–2	1–0
(Kuala Lumpur) Sime Darby	6	2	0	4	6	12	−6	6	0–3	0–2		2–1
(Terengganu) T-Team	6	1	0	5	6	12	−6	3	1–2	1–2	2–1	

(A) Advanced to the 2014 Piala Malaysia quarter finals

13 August 2014 Group stage	T–Team	1–2	Selangor	Kuala Terengganu, Terengganu
20:45 UTC+8	Wanggai 49'; Dos Santos (yellow card) 61'; Hasbullah (yellow card) 78'	Report	Andik 51'; Rangel 53'; Nazmi (yellow card) 78'; Pantelidis (yellow card) 90+3'	Stadium: Sultan Ismail Nasiruddin Shah Stadium; Attendance: 1,500; Referee: Nagor Amir Noor Mohamed

20 August 2014 Group stage	Selangor	0–2	PDRM	Shah Alam, Selangor
20:45 UTC+8	Bunyamin (red card) 12'; Azmi (yellow card) 74'; Thamil (yellow card) 85'	Report	Ashfaq 13'; Rafael (yellow card) 36'; Ezrie (yellow card) 61'; Chad Souza 68'; Thirumurugan (yellow card) 76'; Azizon (yellow card) 85'	Stadium: Shah Alam Stadium; Attendance: 4,000; Referee: Samsudin Ibrahim

23 August 2014 Group stage	Sime Darby	0–2	Selangor	Selayang, Selangor
20:45 UTC+8	Farid (yellow card) 9'; Fahrul (yellow card) 71'; Mensah (yellow card) 85'	Report	Nazmi (yellow card) 11'; Rangel 18'; Hazwan 33'; Rizal (yellow card) 67'	Stadium: Majlis Perbandaran Selayang Stadium; Attendance: 2,000; Referee: Nazmi Nasaruddin

27 August 2014 Group stage	Selangor	1–2	Sime Darby	Shah Alam, Selangor
20:45 UTC+8	Farizal (yellow card) 32'; Hazwan 63'; Pantelidis (yellow card) 79'; Azmi (yellow card) 90+3'	Report	Prabakaran (yellow card) 45+2'; Mensah (yellow card) 60'; Fahrul 75'; Roskam 82'; Yosri (yellow card) 87'	Stadium: Shah Alam Stadium; Attendance: 3,500; Referee: Amirul Izwan Yaacob

30 August 2014 Group stage	PDRM	1–1	Selangor	Paroi, Negeri Sembilan
20:45 UTC+8	Alafi 84'	Report	Andik 11'	Stadium: Tuanku Abdul Rahman Stadium; Attendance: 3,000; Referee: Nagor Amir Noor Mohamed

3 September 2014 Group stage	Selangor	1–0	T–Team	Shah Alam, Selangor
20:45 UTC+8	Rangel 25'	Report		Stadium: Shah Alam Stadium; Attendance: 6,700; Referee: Syed Azhar Syed Kamar

==== Quarter-finals ====
3 October 2014 First leg	Selangor	0–4	FELDA United	Shah Alam, Selangor
20:45 UTC+8		Report	Makeche 22', 84', 86'; Wilson 45'	Stadium: Shah Alam Stadium; Attendance: 5,500; Referee: Zamzaidi Katimin

10 October 2014 Second leg	FELDA United	3–3 (7–3 agg.)	Selangor	Temerloh, Pahang
20:45 UTC+8	Wilson 48', 69'; Indra 87'	Report	Rangel 33', 62'; Andik 51'	Stadium: Temerloh Mini Stadium; Attendance: 10,000; Referee: Suhaizi Shukri

=== AFC Cup ===
Group Stage

Group F

Team	Pld	W	D	L	GF	GA	GD	Pts	HNT	ARE	SEL	MAZ
(Vietnam) Hà Nội T&T	6	5	0	1	14	7	+7	15		2–1	1–0	5–1
(Indonesia) Arema Cronus	6	3	1	2	10	9	+1	10	1–3		1–0	3–2
(Malaysia) Selangor	6	2	2	2	9	6	+3	8	3–1	1–1		4–1
(Maldives) Maziya	6	0	1	5	7	18	−11	1	1–2	1–3	1–1	

25 February 2014 Group stage	Selangor (Malaysia)	1–1	(Indonesia) Arema Cronus	Selayang
20:40 UTC+8	Rangel 9'; Pantelidis (yellow card) 22'; Veenod (yellow card) 81'	Report	Igbonefo (yellow card) 35' (goal) 72'; Gonzáles (yellow card) 78'	Stadium: Majlis Perbandaran Selayang Stadium; Attendance: 7,000; Referee: Wang Di (China)

11 March 2014 Group stage	Maziya (Maldives)	1–1	(Malaysia) Selangor	Malé
16:00 UTC+8	A. Mohamed 51' (pen.); Zhivko (yellow card) 75'; Amdhan (yellow card) 90+4'	Report	Pantelidis 43'; Hamsani (red card) 47'; Andik (yellow card) 87'	Stadium: Galolhu National Stadium; Attendance: 880; Referee: Mohammad Abu Loum (Jordan)

19 March 2014 Group stage	Hà Nội T&T (Vietnam)	1–0	(Malaysia) Selangor	Hanoi
17:00 UTC+6	Văn Biển (yellow card) 37'; Văn Quyết 52'	Report	Juninho (yellow card) 27'; Pantelidis (yellow card) 78'; Hazwan (yellow card) 84'	Stadium: Hàng Đẫy Stadium; Attendance: 3,000; Referee: Jarred Gillett (Australia)

1 April 2014 Group stage	Selangor (Malaysia)	3–1	(Vietnam) Hà Nội T&T	Shah Alam
20:45 UTC+8	Rangel 21', 32', 43' (yellow card) 90'; Bunyamin (yellow card) 34'; Thamil (yellow card) 34'; Azmi (yellow card) 60'; Hadi (yellow card) 77'; Shahrom (yellow card) 84'; Kunanlan (yellow card) 89'	Report	Marronkle 36' (pen.); Sỹ Cường (yellow card) 45+2'; Thành Lương (yellow card) 83'; Văn Biển (yellow card) 87'; Gallagher (yellow card) 90+4'	Stadium: Shah Alam Stadium; Attendance: 2,500; Referee: Abdulrahman Al-Jassim (Qatar)

16 April 2014 Group stage	Arema Cronus (Indonesia)	1–0	(Malaysia) Selangor	Malang Regency, East Java
16:00 UTC+8	Gustavo 45' (pen.) (yellow card) 90+3'; Ahmad (yellow card) 41'; Alfarizi (yellow card) 52'; Sukadana (yellow card) 72'	Report	Shahrom (red card) 43'	Stadium: Kanjuruhan Stadium; Attendance: 23,629; Referee: Nivon Robesh Gamini (Sri Lanka)

23 April 2014 Group stage	Selangor (Malaysia)	4–1	(Maldives) Maziya	Shah Alam
20:45 UTC+8	Rangel 34', 63', 79'; Azmi 83'; Shukur (yellow card) 39'; Pantelidis (yellow card) 90+2'	Report	Abdulla 10'; Zhivkov (yellow card) 33'	Stadium: Shah Alam Stadium; Attendance: 500; Referee: Win Cho (Myanmar)

== Statistics ==
=== Squad statistics ===
As of 10 October 2014

Appearances (Apps.) numbers are for appearances in competitive games only including sub appearances.
\ Red card numbers denote: Numbers in parentheses represent red cards overturned for wrongful dismissal.

No.	Nat.	Player	Pos.	Super League				FA Cup				Malaysia Cup				AFC Cup				Total			
No.	Nat.	Player	Pos.	Apps	Goal	Booked	Sent off (straight red)	Apps	Goal	Booked	Sent off (straight red)	Apps	Goal	Booked	Sent off (straight red)	Apps	Goal	Booked	Sent off (straight red)	Apps	Goal	Booked	Sent off (straight red)
1	(Malaysia)	Syamim Othman	GK																				
2	(Malaysia)	Shazlan Alias	DF	1												1				2			
3	(Malaysia)	Azmi Muslim	DF	17				1				7		2		4	1	1		29	1	3	
4	(Australia)	Steve Pantelidis	DF	20	1	4		2				8		2		5	1	3		35	2	9	
5	(Malaysia)	Shahrom Kalam	DF	15		2						6				5		1	1	26		3	1
6	(Malaysia)	Shukur Jusoh	MF	13		3		1				2				5		1		21		4	
7	(Indonesia)	Andik Vermansyah	MF	20	2	1		2				8	3			2		1		32	5	2	
8	(Malaysia)	Nazmi Faiz	MF	6		1						8		2						14		3	
9	(Brazil)	Paulo Rangel	FW	19	16	5	1	2	1			8	5			6	7	1		35	29	6	1
10	(Timor-Leste)	Juninho	MF	6		1		2	1							3		1		11	1	2	
11	(Malaysia)	Hazwan Bakri	MF	8	1			2				7	2			3		1		20	3	1	
12	(Malaysia)	Bunyamin Umar	DF	22		1		1		1		6			1	4		1		33		3	1
13	(Malaysia)	Raimi Mohd Nor	DF	3				1								2				6			
14	(Malaysia)	Hadi Yahya	FW	19	1	1		2				4				3		1		28	1	2	
15	(Malaysia)	K. Gurusamy	MF	9		2		2								3				14		2	
16	(Malaysia)	S. Kunanlan	MF	21	1	4		1				8				5		1		35	1	5	
17	(Malaysia)	Rizal Fahmi	DF	12		1		2				6		1		3				23		2	
18	(Malaysia)	P. Rajesh	DF	2				1								1				4			
19	(Malaysia)	Afiq Azmi	FW	13	1							2				4				19	1		
20	(Malaysia)	Thamil Arasu	FW	14	2	3		1				5		1		5		1		25	2	5	
21	(Malaysia)	Hamsani Ahmad	GK					1				3				3			1	7			1
22	(Malaysia)	Zaiful Hakim	DF																				
23	(Malaysia)	S. Veenod	MF	17	1	5		1				6				6		1		30	1	6	
24	(Malaysia)	Fitri Shazwan	MF	18	1	1		2				7				6				33	1	1	
25	(Malaysia)	Farizal Marlias	GK	22		2		1				6		1		4				33		3	
27	(Brazil)	Evaldo	DF	5			1													5			1
31	(Malaysia)	K. Satish	MF																				
Own goals					1				0				0				0				1		
Totals					28	37	2		2	1	0		10	9	1		9	15	2		49	62	5

=== Goalscorers ===
Includes all competitive matches.

As of match played 10 October 2014

Rank	Pos.	No.	Player	Super League	FA Cup	Malaysia Cup	AFC Cup	Total
1	FW	9	(Brazil) Paulo Rangel	16	1	5	7	29
2	MF	7	(Indonesia) Andik Vermansyah	2	0	3	0	5
3	FW	11	(Malaysia) Hazwan Bakri	1	0	2	0	3
4	DF	4	(Australia) Steve Pantelidis	1	0	0	1	2
4	FW	20	(Malaysia) A. Thamil Arasu	2	0	0	0	2
6	DF	3	(Malaysia) Azmi Muslim	0	0	0	1	1
6	MF	10	(Timor-Leste) Juninho	0	1	0	0	1
6	FW	14	(Malaysia) Hadi Yahya	1	0	0	0	1
6	MF	16	(Malaysia) S. Kunanlan	1	0	0	0	1
6	FW	19	(Malaysia) Afiq Azmi	1	0	0	0	1
6	MF	23	(Malaysia) S. Veenod	1	0	0	0	1
6	MF	24	(Malaysia) Fitri Shazwan	1	0	0	0	1
Own Goals				1	0	0	0	1
TOTALS				28	2	10	9	49
Own Goals Conceded
1	TBD	TBD	TBD	0	0	0	0	0
TOTALS				0	0	0	0	0

=== Clean sheets ===
Rnk	No.	Player	Super League	FA Cup	Malaysia Cup	AFC Cup	Total
1	25	(Malaysia) Farizal Marlias	11	0	2	0	13
2	21	(Malaysia) Hamsani Ahmad	0	1	0	0	1
TOTALS			11	1	2	0	14

=== Disciplinary record ===
As of match played 10 October 2014

Rank	No.	Pos.	Name	Super League		FA Cup		Malaysia Cup		AFC Cup		Total	
Rank	No.	Pos.	Name	Booked	Sent off (straight red)	Booked	Sent off (straight red)	Booked	Sent off (straight red)	Booked	Sent off (straight red)	Booked	Sent off (straight red)
1	4	DF	(Australia) Steve Pantelidis	4	-	-	-	2	-	3	-	9	-
2	9	FW	(Brazil) Paulo Rangel	5	1	-	-	-	-	1	-	6	1
2	23	MF	(Malaysia) S. Veenod	5	-	-	-	-	-	1	-	6	-
4	16	MF	(Malaysia) S. Kunanlan	4	-	-	-	-	-	1	-	5	-
4	20	FW	(Malaysia) A. Thamil Arasu	3	-	-	-	1	-	1	-	5	-
6	6	MF	(Malaysia) Shukur Jusoh	3	-	-	-	-	-	1	-	4	-
7	3	DF	(Malaysia) Azmi Muslim	-	-	-	-	2	-	1	-	3	-
7	5	DF	(Malaysia) Shahrom Kalam	2	-	-	-	-	-	1	1	3	1
7	8	MF	(Malaysia) Nazmi Faiz	1	-	-	-	2	-	-	-	3	-
7	12	DF	(Malaysia) Bunyamin Umar	1	-	1	-	-	1	1	-	3	1
7	25	GK	(Malaysia) Farizal Marlias	2	-	-	-	1	-	-	-	3	-
12	7	MF	(Indonesia) Andik Vermansyah	1	-	-	-	-	-	1	-	2	-
12	10	MF	(Timor-Leste) Juninho	1	-	-	-	-	-	1	-	2	-
12	14	FW	(Malaysia) Hadi Yahya	1	-	-	-	-	-	1	-	2	-
12	15	MF	(Malaysia) K. Gurusamy	2	-	-	-	-	-	-	-	2	-
12	17	DF	(Malaysia) Rizal Fahmi	1	-	-	-	1	-	-	-	2	-
17	11	FW	(Malaysia) Hazwan Bakri	-	-	-	-	-	-	1	-	1	-
17	21	GK	(Malaysia) Hamsani Ahmad	-	-	-	-	-	-	-	1	-	1
17	24	MF	(Malaysia) Fitri Shazwan	1	-	-	-	-	-	-	-	1	-
17	27	DF	(Brazil) Evaldo	-	1	-	-	-	-	-	-	-	1
Total				37	2	1	-	9	1	15	2	62	5
