= 2012 Selangor FA season =

Selangor FA
2012 season
- Chairman: Khalid Ibrahim
- Manager: Abdul Mokhtar Ahmad
- Stadium: Shah Alam Stadium
- Malaysia Super League: 3rd
- FA Cup: Round 2
- Malaysia Cup: Semi-finals
- Top goalscorer: Boško Balaban (12)

The 2012 Selangor FA Season was Selangor FA's 7th season playing soccer in the Malaysia Super League Since its inception in 2004.

Selangor FA began the season on 10 January 2012. They will also compete in two domestic cups; The FA Cup Malaysia and Malaysia Cup.

== Malaysia Super League ==
=== League table ===
| Pos | Team | Pld | W | D | L | GF | GA | GD | Pts | Qualification or relegation |
|---|---|---|---|---|---|---|---|---|---|---|
| 1 | Kelantan (C, Q) | 26 | 18 | 6 | 2 | 53 | 18 | +35 | 60 | 2013 AFC Cup group stage |
| 2 | LionsXII (Note: LionsXII are not eligible for any AFC competition spots) | 26 | 15 | 5 | 6 | 48 | 23 | +25 | 50 | |
| 3 | Selangor (Q) | 26 | 12 | 7 | 7 | 40 | 26 | +14 | 43 | 2013 AFC Cup group stage (Note: Qualified as the next highest-placed local team behind Liga Super and 2012 Piala FA winners Kelantan.) |
| 4 | Perak | 26 | 13 | 3 | 10 | 40 | 43 | −3 | 42 | |
| 5 | Terengganu | 26 | 11 | 8 | 7 | 41 | 33 | +8 | 41 | |

Source: RSSSF
Rules for classification: 1) points; 2) goal difference; 3) number of goals scored
(C) Champions; (Q) Qualified for the phase indicated

=== Results ===
Fixtures and Results of the Malaysia Super League 2012 season.

| 10 January Week 1 | Negeri Sembilan FA | 2–2 | Selangor FA | Tuanku Abdul Rahman Stadium, Paroi, Negeri Sembilan |
| 20:45 UTC+08:00 | Effa Owona 4' 34' (pen.) | Report | Amirul Hadi 66'; Safiq Rahim 73' | Attendance: 32,000 |

| 14 January Week 2 | Selangor FA | 1–0 | Perak FA | National Stadium, Bukit Jalil, Kuala Lumpur |
| 20:45 UTC+08:00 | Safiq Rahim 23' | | | Attendance: 45,000 |

| 17 January Week 3 | Felda United FC | 1–0 | Selangor FA | Hang Jebat Stadium, Ayer Keroh, Malacca |
| 16:45 UTC+08:00 | Mohd Azrul Ahmad 28' | Report | | Attendance: 5,000 |

| 21 January Week 4 | Selangor FA | 0–0 | Sarawak FA | National Stadium, Bukit Jalil, Kuala Lumpur |
| 20:45 UTC+08:00 | | Report | | Attendance: 22,000 |

| 28 January Week 5 | PBDKT T-Team FC | 1–2 | Selangor FA | Sultan Ismail Nasiruddin Shah Stadium, Kuala Terengganu, Terengganu |
| 20:45 UTC+08:00 | Zairo Anuar Zalani 49' (pen.) | Report | Ramez Dayoub 35' (pen.); Azidan Sarudin 78' | Attendance: 12,000 |

| 8 February Week 6 | Selangor FA | 1–1 | Singapore LIONSXII | National Stadium, Bukit Jalil, Kuala Lumpur |
| 20:45 UTC+08:00 | K. Gurusamy 45' | | Shahril Ishak 43' | Attendance: 30,000 |

| 11 February Week 7 | PKNS FC | 2–0 | Selangor FA | Petaling Jaya Stadium, Petaling Jaya, Selangor |
| 20:45 UTC+08:00 | Rudie Ramli 33'; Mohd Helmi Remeli 60' | | | Attendance: 20,000 |

| 14 February Week 8 | Selangor FA | 2–1 | Kelantan FA | National Stadium, Bukit Jalil, Kuala Lumpur |
| 20:45 UTC+08:00 | Mohd Safiq Rahim 46'; Boško Balaban 75' | | S. Subramaniam 90' | Attendance: 55,000 |

| 3 March Week 9 | Kedah FA | 1–0 | Selangor FA | Darul Aman Stadium, Alor Setar, Kedah |
| 20:45 UTC+08:00 | Abdulfatah Safi 84' (pen.) | | | Attendance: 15,000 |

| 17 March Week 10 | Selangor FA | 3–0 | Kuala Lumpur FA | National Stadium, Bukit Jalil, Kuala Lumpur |
| 20:45 UTC+08:00 | Boško Balaban 56'; P. Gunalan 60'; Amirul Hadi 90+1' | | | Attendance: 30,000 |

| 31 March Week 11 | Sabah FA | 1–1 | Selangor FA | Likas Stadium, Kota Kinabalu, Sabah |
| 20:15 UTC+08:00 | Michael Baird 3' | | P. Gunalan 60' |

| 7 April Week 12 | Selangor FA | 6–1 | Terengganu FA | Petaling Jaya Stadium, Petaling Jaya, Selangor |
| 20:45 UTC+08:00 | Boško Balaban 25'; Solehin 36'; Amri Yahyah 37' 80'; Safiq Rahim 45+1'; Famirul Asraf 86' | | Ismail Faruqi 9' |

| 14 April Week 13 | Johor FC | 1–1 | Selangor FA | Pasir Gudang Corporation Stadium, Pasir Gudang, Johor |
| 20:45 UTC+08:00 | Mohd Riduwan M'aon 19' | | Boško Balaban 82' |

| 17 April Week 14 | Selangor FA | 2–0 | Johor FC | Shah Alam Stadium, Shah Alam, Selangor |
| 20:45 UTC+08:00 | Boško Balaban 56' 87' |

| 8 May Week 15 | Selangor FA | 1–3 | Negeri Sembilan FA | Shah Alam Stadium, Shah Alam, Selangor |
| 20:45 UTC+08:00 | Boško Balaban 90+3' | | Firdaus Azizul 1'; Shakir Ali 34' 63' |

| 11 May Week 16 | Perak FA | 2–0 | Selangor FA | Perak Stadium, Ipoh, Perak |
| 20:45 UTC+08:00 | Michal Kubala 16'; Bodjongo 85' |

| 15 May Week 17 | Selangor FA | 2–1 | Felda United FC | Shah Alam Stadium, Shah Alam, Selangor |
| 20:45 UTC+08:00 | Azidan Sarudin 37' 48' | | Farderin Kadir 45+1' |

| 16 June Week 18 | Sarawak FA | 0–1 | Selangor FA | Sarawak State Stadium, Kuching, Sarawak |
| 20:15 UTC+08:00 | | | Bosko Balaban 8' |

| 19 June Week 19 | Selangor FA | 5–0 | PBDKT T-Team FC | Shah Alam Stadium, Shah Alam, Selangor |
| 20:45 UTC+08:00 | Safiq Rahim 6' (pen.); Ramez Dayoub 45+1'; Boško Balaban 63'; R. Surendran 86'; Fitri Shazwan 90' |

| 20 March Week 20 | Singapore LIONSXII | 1–1 | Selangor FA | Jalan Besar Stadium, Kallang, Singapore |
| 19:45 UTC+08:00 | Sufian Anuar 62' | | Boško Balaban 81' |

| 26 June Week 21 | Selangor FA | 1–0 | PKNS FC | Shah Alam Stadium, Shah Alam, Selangor |
| 20:45 UTC+08:00 | Amri Yahyah 44' |

| 29 June Week 22 | Kelantan FA | 1–0 | Selangor FA | Sultan Mohammad IV Stadium, Kota Bharu, Kelantan |
| 20:45 UTC+08:00 | Mohammed Ghaddar 25' |

| 3 July Week 23 | Selangor FA | 1–1 | Kedah FA | Shah Alam Stadium, Shah Alam, Selangor |
| 20:45 UTC+08:00 | Boško Balaban 63' | | Khyril Muhymeen 89' |

| 7 July Week 24 | Kuala Lumpur FA | 0–4 | Selangor FA | Shah Alam Stadium, Shah Alam, Selangor^{1} |
| 20:45 UTC+08:00 | | | Azidan Sarudin 35'; Amri Yahyah 46' 79'; Ramez Dayoub 62' |

- ^{1} The venue was changed from Kuala Lumpur FA original venue at Hang Jebat Stadium, Melaka to Selangor FA venue at Shah Alam at the request of Kuala Lumpur FA.

| 10 July Week 25 | Selangor FA | 3–2 | Sabah FA | Shah Alam Stadium, Shah Alam, Selangor |
| 20:45 UTC+08:00 | Amri Yahyah 15'; Solehin 29'; Boško Balaban 47' | | Brendan Gan 84'; Rozaimi 88' |

| 14 July Week 26 | Terengganu FA | 3–0 | Selangor FA | Sultan Ismail Nasiruddin Shah Stadium, Kuala Terengganu, Terengganu |
| 20:45 UTC+08:00 | Francis Doe 9' 42'; Nordin Alias 48' |

== Malaysia FA Cup ==
=== Matches ===
| Saturday 18 February Round of 32 | Shahzan Muda FC (Pahang) | 0 – 4 | Selangor FA | Temerloh Mini Stadium, Temerloh, Pahang |
| 20:45 UTC+08:00 | | | Boško Balaban 24'; Mohd Safiq Rahim 66' 74'; Mohd Amri Yahyah 82' | Attendance: 3000 |

| Saturday 10 March Round of 16 | Johor FC | 2 – 2 (a.e.t.) (5 – 4 p) | Selangor FA | Pasir Gudang Corporation Stadium, Johor Bahru, Johor |
| 20:45 UTC+08:00 | Ahmad Fauzi Shaari 59'; Arthuro Bernhardt 68' | | Azidan Sarudin 30'; Asraruddin Putra 55' | Attendance: 20,000 |
| | Penalties |
| | Ahmad Fauzi Shaari (penalty scored); Riduwan M'aon (penalty missed); Kaironnisam Sahabudin (penalty scored); Jasazrin Jamaluddin (penalty scored); Arthuro Bernhardt (penalty scored); Zamri Chin (penalty scored) | | (penalty scored) Amri Yahyah; (penalty scored) Boško Balaban; (penalty scored) Razman Roslan; (penalty missed) Amirul Hadi; (penalty scored) P. Gunalan; (penalty missed) K. Soley |

== Malaysia Cup ==
=== Group stage ===
==== Group D ====
| Pos | Team | Pld | W | D | L | GF | GA | GD | Pts |
|---|---|---|---|---|---|---|---|---|---|
| 1 | Selangor FA (A) | 6 | 4 | 1 | 1 | 12 | 6 | +6 | 13 |
| 2 | Pahang FA (A) | 6 | 3 | 1 | 2 | 17 | 13 | +4 | 10 |
| 3 | Sarawak FA | 6 | 2 | 1 | 3 | 10 | 13 | −3 | 7 |
| 4 | (Terengganu) T-Team | 6 | 1 | 1 | 4 | 7 | 14 | −7 | 4 |

(A) Advanced to knockout stage

=== Knockout stage ===
==== Bracket ====
Quarterfinals
D2 | Pahang FA | 2 | 0 | 2
A1 | (Singapore) LIONSXII | 1 | 2 | 3
B2 | ATM FA | 3 | 3 | 6
C1 | Negeri Sembilan | 2 | 1 | 3
C2 | (Kuala Lumpur) Felda United FC | 1 | 2 | 3
B1 | Kelantan FA | 2 | 2 | 4
A2 | Johor FC | 1 | 1 | 2
D1 | Selangor FA | 3 | 2 | 5

Semifinals
A1 | (Singapore) LIONSXII | 1 | 1(4) | 2(4)
B2 | ATM FA (p) | 1 | 1(5) | 2(5)
B1 | Kelantan FA | 1 | 2 | 3
D1 | Selangor FA | 0 | 0 | 0

Final
B2 | ATM FA | 2
B1 | Kelantan FA | 3

== Transfer In/Outs ==
=== Transfers (In) ===
Note: Flags indicate national team as defined under FIFA eligibility rules; some limited exceptions apply. Players may hold more than one non-FIFA nationality.

| No. | Pos. | Nation | Player |
|---|---|---|---|
| — | GK | MAS | G. Jeevananthan (from USM FC) |
| — | GK | MAS | Norazlan Razali (from Kuala Lumpur FA) |
| — | DF | MAS | Khairul Anuar Khalid (promote from Selangor FA President's Cup Team) |
| — | DF | LBN | Ramez Dayoub (from Magway) |
| — | DF | MAS | Muhammad Ariff Zulkifly (from Harimau Muda B) |
| — | DF | MAS | Ahmad Faizal Sumar (from Harimau Muda B) |
| — | DF | IND | Gouramangi Singh (from Prayag United) |
| — | MF | MAS | Mohd Hasmarul Fadzir Hassan (from Felda United FC) |
| — | MF | MAS | Solehin Kanasian Abdullah (from Kelantan FA) |
| — | MF | MAS | Zaiful Abdul Hakim (from Harimau Muda B) |

| No. | Pos. | Nation | Player |
|---|---|---|---|
| — | MF | MAS | K. Gurusamy (from Harimau Muda A) |
| — | FW | MAS | R. Surendran (from Pahang FA) |
| — | FW | MAS | Famirul Asyraf Sayuti (from Pahang FA) |
| — | FW | MAS | Wan Mohd Hoesne Wan Hussain (from Johor FC) |
| — | FW | MAS | Adib Aizuddin Abdul Latif (from Johor FA) |
| — | FW | COD | Lelo Mbele (from Al-Nasr Benghazi) |
| — | FW | MAS | Muhammad Nazrul Kamaruzzaman (from Harimau Muda B) |
| — | FW | CRO | Boško Balaban (from Panionios F.C.) |

=== Transfers (Out) ===
Note: Flags indicate national team as defined under FIFA eligibility rules; some limited exceptions apply. Players may hold more than one non-FIFA nationality.

| No. | Pos. | Nation | Player |
|---|---|---|---|
| — | GK | MAS | Mohd Iqbal Suhaimi (to PBDKT T-Team FC) |
| — | GK | MAS | Saiful Amar Sudar (to Sarawak FA) |
| — | GK | MAS | Mohd Azrul Hafiz Amran (to ATM FA) |
| — | GK | MAS | Muhammad Syafizullah Abdul Wahab (to Sime Darby FC) |
| — | DF | MAS | Khairul Anuar Baharom (to Retired) |
| — | DF | MAS | D. Surendran (Released) |
| — | DF | MAS | Yosri Derma Raju (to Sarawak FA) |
| — | DF | MAS | Muhammad Asyraf Khairudin (to MBJB FC) |
| — | MF | MAS | K. Depan Sakwati (to Sarawak FA) |
| — | FW | COD | Lelo Mbele (Released) |
| — | MF | MAS | Mohammad Hardi Jaafar (to Felda United FC) |
| — | MF | MAS | Muhammad Zulhisyam Mohd Safian (to MBJB FC) |
| — | MF | MAS | Muhamad Saifullah Ismail (to UiTM FC) |
| — | MF | MAS | Syafiq Azri Ahmad Kamal (to ATM FA) |
| — | FW | MAS | S. Sritharan (Released) |
| — | FW | MAS | Rudie Ramli (to PKNS FC) |

| No. | Pos. | Nation | Player |
|---|---|---|---|
| — | FW | MAS | Mohd Fadzli Saari (to PBDKT T-Team FC) |
| — | FW | MAS | Mohamad Amiruddin Mohd Taib (to MP Muar FC) |
| — | FW | MAS | Mohd Akbar Khamis (to Malacca FA) |
| — | GK | MAS | Amzar Ahmad (Released) |
| — | DF | MAS | Mohd Azrul Ariff Mohd Ridzwan (to PKNS FC) |
| — | MF | MAS | Mohd Hafif Azhar (to Malacca FA) |
| — | MF | MAS | Mohd Jamiuddin Jamaluddin (Released) |
| — | DF | MAS | K. Thiyagaraja (Released) |
| — | DF | MAS | G. Ganesan (to Kuala Lumpur FA) |
| — | DF | MAS | Muhamad Jafrizan Mat Jid (Released) |
| — | FW | MAS | Mazwan Yaacob (to Malinja FC) |
| — | MF | MAS | A. Puvanarajah (to Sime Darby FC) |
| — | DF | MAS | K. Prabakaran (to Sime Darby FC) |
| — | MF | MAS | Choi Soon Seng (Released) |
| — | FW | MAS | Mohd Azrul Hafiq Amran (Released) |
