= Bunyamin Umar =

Malaysian footballer

Personal information
- Full name: Mohd Bunyamin bin Umar
- Date of birth: 7 January 1988 (age 38)
- Place of birth: Sik, Kedah, Malaysia
- Height: 1.78 m (5 ft 10 in)
- Positions: Centre-back; defensive midfielder

Youth career
- Bukit Jalil Sports School

Senior career*
Years	Team	Apps	(Gls)
2005–2007	Kedah		
2007–2009	UPB-MyTeam		
2009–2017	Selangor F.C.		
2018–2020	Pahang	22	(0)

International career^{‡}
2004–2006	Malaysia U-19		
2006–2008	Malaysia U-20		
2007–2011	Malaysia U-23		
2008–	Malaysia	25	(1)
- * Club domestic league appearances and goals as of 21 July 2018 ‡ National team caps and goals as of 18 December 2017

Mohd Bunyamin bin Umar (born 7 January 1988) is a retired Malaysian professional footballer.

Bunyamin is a former member of the Malaysia National, Malaysia U-23 and a former member of the Malaysia U-20 squad. He also was the team captain of Selangor F.C. for the 2014 season.

== International career ==
Bunyamin made his Malaysia debut in 2005. One of his matches as a Malaysia U-23 player was against Bahrain in the World Cup 2010 qualifying round after being sent on as a substitute by coach B. Sathianathan on 32 minutes. He then scored his first senior goal in added time in the first half and Malaysia's only goal in the 4–1 defeat to Bahrain.

He was the captain of Malaysia U-19 that competed in the 2007 Champions Youth Cup in Malaysia. He was given a trial for the Chelsea reserve team which lasted for two weeks.

== Career statistics ==
=== Club ===
As of 21 July 2018.

Appearances and goals by club, season and competition
Club	Season	League			Cup		League Cup		Continental		Total	
Club	Season	Division	Apps	Goals	Apps	Goals	Apps	Goals	Apps	Goals	Apps	Goals
Selangor	2010	Malaysia Super League	0	0	0	0	0	0	–		0	0
Selangor	2011	Malaysia Super League	13	1	0	0	0	0	–		0	0
Selangor	2012	Malaysia Super League	0	0	0	0	0	0	–		0	0
Selangor	2013	Malaysia Super League	0	0	0	0	0	0	–		0	0
Selangor	2014	Malaysia Super League	22	0	1	0	6	0	4	0	33	0
Selangor	2015	Malaysia Super League	12	0	0	0	6	0	–		18	0
Selangor	2016	Malaysia Super League	10	0	1	0	9	0	2	0	22	0
Selangor	2017	Malaysia Super League	10	0	0	0	1	0	–		11	0
Selangor	Total		0	0	0	0	0	0	0	0	0	0
Pahang	2018	Malaysia Super League	13	0	4	0	0	0	–		17	0
Pahang	Total		13	0	4	0	0	0	0	0	17	0
Career total			0	0	0	0	0	0	0	0	0	0

=== International ===
As of 1 July 2018

Malaysia
Year	Apps	Goals
2007	2	1
2009	4	0
2010	1	0
2011	2	0
2012	14	0
2014	2	0
Total	25	1

== Outside football ==
Bunyamin earned a bachelor's degree in Human Resource Development from University of Putra, Malaysia in 2012 alongside teammate, Mahali Jasuli. They are dubbed as examples for footballers in Malaysia to further their education aspired by "Thinking Athletes Initiative" national blueprint under the Ministry of Higher Education and the National Sports Institute, aimed to grow and develop professional, smart and optimal performance elite athletes to spur and drive sports excellence, researches and development for the country.

== International goals ==
#	Date	Venue	Opponent	Score	Result	Competition
1.	21 October 2007	Manama, Bahrain	Bahrain	4–1	Lost	2010 FIFA World Cup qualification AFC

Sporting positions
Preceded by Asraruddin Putra Omar	Selangor FA captain 2014	Succeeded by Shahrom Kalam
