= 2012 Malaysia FA Cup =

Piala FA

Tournament details
- Country: Malaysia; Singapore; Cambodia
- Teams: 32

Final positions
- Champions: Kelantan FA (1st title)
- Runners-up: Sime Darby FC

Tournament statistics
- Matches played: 37
- Goals scored: 96 (2.59 per match)
- Top goal scorer: 6 goals Patrick Ronaldinho Wleh (Sime Darby FC)

Awards
- Best player: Mohd Norfarhan Mohamad (Kelantan FA)

The 2012 Malaysia FA Cup, also known as the Astro Piala FA due to the competition's sponsorship by Astro Arena, was the 23rd season of the Malaysia FA Cup, a knockout competition for Malaysia's state football association and clubs.

Terengganu FA were the defending champions.

The cup winner qualified for the 2013 AFC Cup.

== Format ==
Several changes have been made to the competition for 2012. The number of participating teams was increased from 30 to 32 and because of this, the defending champions and runners up in the first round would not receive byes as in previous seasons.

Just like the previous edition, the first two rounds would be single matches. The quarter finals and semi finals would be played over two legs while the final will be played at National Stadium, Bukit Jalil, Kuala Lumpur, on Saturday, 19 May 2012.

Cambodian outfit Preah Khan Reach have been invited for the first time.

The winner of the 2012 edition will qualify for the 2013 AFC Cup.

== Matches ==
The draw for the 2012 Piala FA was held on 13 December 2011 at Wisma FAM.

=== Bracket ===
Round of 32
Terengganu FA	4
(Malaysia) PDRM FA	0
(Malaysia) ATM FA	0
Perak FA	1
Singapore LIONSXII	3
(Selangor) UiTM FC	0
Malacca FA	0
(Negeri Sembilan) Betaria FC	4
(Penang) USM FC	2
(Kuala Lumpur) Pos Malaysia FC	1
Sabah FA	0
(Kuala Lumpur) Sime Darby FC	2
Negeri Sembilan FA	1
Johor FC	2
Selangor FA	4
(Pahang) Shahzan Muda FC	0
Kelantan FA	2
Sarawak FA	1
Kuala Lumpur FA	3
(Johor) MP Muar FC	0
(Cambodia) Preah Khan Reach	2
Penang AUCMS	1
(Kuala Lumpur) SPA FC	3
(Johor) MBJB FC	0
Kedah FA (p)	1(4)
(Selangor) PKNS FC	1(2)
(Penang) SDM Navy FC	0
Perlis FA	3
Johor FA	0
(Terengganu) T-Team FC	2
Pahang FA	1
(Kuala Lumpur) Felda United FC	0

Round of 16
Terengganu FA	1
Perak FA	0
Singapore LIONSXII	2
(Negeri Sembilan) Betaria FC	0
(Penang) USM FC	0
(Kuala Lumpur) Sime Darby FC	2
Johor FC (p)	2(5)
Selangor FA	2(4)
Kelantan FA	3
Kuala Lumpur FA	2
(Cambodia) Preah Khan Reach	0
(Kuala Lumpur) SPA FC	1
Kedah FA	3
Perlis FA	2
(Terengganu) T-Team FC	3
Pahang FA	2

Quarter-finals
Terengganu FA	1	0	1
Singapore LIONSXII	0	0	0
(Kuala Lumpur) Sime Darby FC	3	2	5
Johor FC	2	1	3
Kelantan FA	3	2	5
(Kuala Lumpur) SPA FC	0	0	0
Kedah FA	0	2	2
(Terengganu) T-Team FC	0	1	1

Semi-finals
Terengganu FA	1	0	1
(Kuala Lumpur) Sime Darby FC	2	0	2
Kelantan FA (a)	1	2	3
Kedah FA	1	2	3

Final
(Kuala Lumpur) Sime Darby FC	0
Kelantan FA	1

=== Round of 32 ===
The legs were played on 17, 18 & 19 February 2012.

Friday 17 February	Perak FA	1–0	(Malaysia) ATM FA	Perak Stadium, Ipoh, Perak
20:45 UTC+08:00	Michal Kubala 3'			Attendance: 20,000

Saturday 18 February	SPA FC (Kuala Lumpur)	3–0	(Johor) MBJB FC	Petronas Mini Stadium, Bangi, Selangor
16:15 UTC+08:00	Fadzly iskandar 5'; Shafiq Zahari 16'; Zulkifli Affendi 26'			Attendance: 300

Saturday 18 February	UiTM FC (Selangor)	0–3	Singapore LIONSXII	UiTM Stadium, Shah Alam, Selangor
16:15 UTC+08:00			Shaiful Esah 10'; Madhu Mohana 15'; Ahmad Shahir Ismail 83' (o.g.)	Attendance: 4000

Saturday 18 February	Pos Malaysia FC (Kuala Lumpur)	1–2	(Penang) USM FC	Majlis Perbandaran Selayang Stadium, Selayang, Selangor
16:15 UTC+08:00	Fakhrul Aiman 88'		Edrisar Kaye 55'; Muhd Afzan Zainal Abidin 70'	Attendance: 50

Saturday 18 February	Betaria FC (Negeri Sembilan)	4–0	Malacca FA	Hang Tuah Stadium, Malacca
16:15 UTC+08:00	Mohd Saufi Ibrahim 39'; S. Harivarman 66'; Mohd Fauzi Abdul Kadar 78' 86'			Attendance: 8000

Saturday 18 February	Terengganu FA	4–0	(Malaysia) PDRM FA	Sultan Ismail Nasiruddin Shah Stadium, Kuala Terengganu, Terengganu
20:45 UTC+08:00	Abdul Hadi Yahya 10'; Abdul Manaf Mamat 39' 66'; Francis Forkey Doe 81'			Attendance: 5000

Saturday 18 February	Negeri Sembilan FA	1–2	Johor FC	Tuanku Abdul Rahman Stadium, Paroi, Negeri Sembilan
20:45 UTC+08:00	Jean-Emmanuel Effa Owona 31'		Arthuro Bernhardt 25' 81'	Attendance: 25,000

Saturday 18 February	Shahzan Muda FC (Pahang)	0–4	Selangor FA	Temerloh Mini Stadium, Temerloh, Pahang
20:45 UTC+08:00			Boško Balaban 24'; Mohd Safiq Rahim 66' 74'; Mohd Amri Yahyah 82'	Attendance: 3000

Saturday 18 February	Kelantan FA	2–1	Sarawak FA	Sultan Mohammad IV Stadium, Kota Bharu, Kelantan
20:45 UTC+08:00	Indra Putra Mahayuddin 34'; Mohd Norfarhan Mohamad 90+1'		Mohd Azizan Baba 18'	Attendance: 30,000

Saturday 18 February	Kuala Lumpur FA	3–0	(Johor) Muar Municipal Council FC	Hang Jebat Stadium, Ayer Keroh, Malacca
20:45 UTC+08:00	Arman Fareez Ali 39'; Khairul Anuar Shafie 63'; Fazuan Abdullah 90'			Attendance: 100

Saturday 18 February	Preah Khan Reach (Cambodia)	2–1	Penang FA	National Stadium, Bukit Jalil, Kuala Lumpur
20:45 UTC+08:00	Phanny Ratha 28'; Prak Mony Udom 86'		Hasmawi Hassan 88'	Attendance: 99

Saturday 18 February	Kedah FA	1 – 1 (a.e.t) (4–2 p)	(Selangor) PKNS FC	Darul Aman Stadium, Alor Setar, Kedah
20:45 UTC+08:00	Abdulfatah Safi 5'		Nazrin Syamsul Bahri 53'	Attendance: 12,000

Saturday 18 February	Perlis FA	3–0	(Penang) SDMS Kepala Batas FC	Utama Stadium, Kangar, Perlis
20:45 UTC+08:00	Khairool Anas 14'; Rizal Gahazali 24'; Lamin Conteh 90'			Attendance: 8000

Saturday 18 February	Johor FA	0–2	(Terengganu) PBDKT T-Team FC	Pasir Gudang Corporation Stadium, Johor Bahru, Johor
20:45 UTC+08:00			Zairo Anuar Zalani 12'; Khairul Izwan 88'	Attendance: 2000

Sunday 19 February	Sime Darby FC (Kuala Lumpur)	2–0	Sabah FA	Majlis Perbandaran Selayang Stadium, Selayang, Selangor
16:15 UTC+08:00	Mohd Shazlan Alias 41'; Patrick Wleh 45+1' (pen.)			Attendance: 5000

Sunday 19 February	Felda United FC (Kuala Lumpur)	0–1	Pahang FA	Hang Jebat Stadium, Ayer Keroh, Malacca
20:45 UTC+08:00			Mohd Hafiz Kamal 41'

=== Round of 16 ===
The legs were played on 9 & 10 March 2012.

Friday 9 March	T-Team FC (Terengganu)	3–2	Pahang FA	Sultan Ismail Nasiruddin Shah Stadium, Kuala Terengganu, Terengganu
20:45 UTC+08:00	Azrul Hazran 58'; Mohd Fadzli Saari 63'; Mohd Faiz Subri 90+3'		Hazuan Daud 50'; Azamuddin Akil 59'	Attendance: 8000

Saturday 10 March	Singapore LIONSXII	2–0	(Negeri Sembilan) Betaria FC	Jalan Besar Stadium, Kallang, Singapore
19:45 UTC+08:00	Shahril Ishak 55'; Sufian Anuar 84'			Attendance: 5000

Saturday 10 March	Terengganu FA	1–0	Perak FA	Sultan Ismail Nasiruddin Shah Stadium, Kuala Terengganu, Terengganu
20:45 UTC+08:00	Mohd Ashaari Shamsuddin 45+4'			Attendance: 25,000; Referee: Sokri Nor

Saturday 10 March	USM FC (Penang)	0–2	(Kuala Lumpur) Sime Darby FC	USM Athletics Stadium, Penang
20:45 UTC+08:00			Patrick Wleh 57' (pen.); Mohd Irme Mat 84'	Referee: 1900

Saturday 10 March	Johor FC	2 – 2 (a.e.t) (5–4 p)	Selangor FA	Pasir Gudang Corporation Stadium, Johor Bahru, Johor
20:45 UTC+08:00	Ahmad Fauzi Shaari 59'; Arthuro Bernhardt 68'		Azidan Sarudin 30'; Asraruddin Putra 55'	Attendance: 20,000
	Penalties
	Ahmad Fauzi Shaari (penalty scored); Riduwan M'aon (penalty missed); Kaironnisam Sahabudin (penalty scored); Jasazrin Jamaluddin (penalty scored); Arthuro Bernhardt (penalty scored); Zamri Chin (penalty scored)		(penalty scored) Amri Yahyah; (penalty scored) Boško Balaban; (penalty scored) Razman Roslan; (penalty missed) Amirul Hadi; (penalty scored) P. Gunalan; (penalty missed) K. Soley

Saturday 10 March	Kelantan FA	3–2	Kuala Lumpur FA	Sultan Mohammad IV Stadium, Kota Bharu, Kelantan
20:45 UTC+08:00	Mohd Norfarhan Mohamad 30'; Indra Putra Mahayuddin 43'; Mohd Badri Mohd Radzi 70'		Afiq Azmi 39'; Fazuan Abdullah 90+3'	Attendance: 30,000

Saturday 10 March	Preah Khan Reach (Cambodia)	0–1	(Kuala Lumpur) SPA FC	National Stadium, Bukit Jalil, Kuala Lumpur
20:45 UTC+08:00			Zulkifli Affendi 52'	Attendance: 30

Saturday 10 March	Kedah FA	3–2	Perlis FA	Darul Aman Stadium, Alor Setar, Kedah
20:45 UTC+08:00	Khyril Muhymeen 6' 37'; Amar Rohidan 27'		Mohd Nazrin Baharuddin 21'; Henry Lewis 67'	Attendance: 15,000

=== Quarter-finals ===
The first legs were played on 23 and 24 March 2012, and the second legs on 27 March 2012.

Team 1	Agg.	Team 2	1st leg	2nd leg
Terengganu FA	1–0	Singapore LIONSXII	1–0	0 – 0
Sime Darby FC (Kuala Lumpur)	5–3	Johor FC	3–2	2 – 1
SPA FC (Kuala Lumpur)	0–5	Kelantan FA	0–3	0 – 2
Kedah FA	2–1	(Terengganu) T-Team FC	0–0	2 – 1

==== First leg ====
Friday 23 March	Sime Darby FC (Kuala Lumpur)	3–2	Johor FC	Majlis Perbandaran Selayang Stadium, Selayang, Selangor
16:15 UTC+08:00	Azmirul Azmi 6'; Razali Umar Kandasamy 35'; Patrick Wleh 68'		Arthuro Bernhardt 41' 80'	Referee: Zamzaidi Katimin

Saturday 24 March	Terengganu FA	1–0	Singapore LIONSXII	Sultan Ismail Nasiruddin Shah Stadium, Kuala Terengganu, Terengganu
20:45 UTC+08:00	Joseph Kalang Tie 66'

Saturday 24 March	SPA FC (Kuala Lumpur)	0–3	Kelantan FA	National Stadium, Bukit Jalil, Kuala Lumpur
20:45 UTC+08:00			Mohd Badri Mohd Radzi 45'; Mohd Norfarhan Mohamad 53' 77'

Saturday 24 March	Kedah FA	0–0	(Terengganu) T-Team FC	Darul Aman Stadium, Alor Setar, Kedah
20:45 UTC+08:00				Referee: Wan Mohd Tarmizi Wan Ibrahim

==== Second leg ====
Tuesday 27 March	Singapore LIONSXII	0–0	Terengganu FA	Jalan Besar Stadium, Kallang, Singapore
19:45 UTC+08:00

Tuesday 27 March	Johor FC	1–2	(Kuala Lumpur) Sime Darby FC	Pasir Gudang Corporation Stadium, Johor Bahru, Johor
20:45 UTC+08:00	Ahmad Fauzi Shaari 77' (pen.)		Patrick Wleh 3' 22'	Referee: zofri tajudin

Tuesday 27 March	Kelantan FA	2–0	(Kuala Lumpur) SPA FC	Sultan Mohammad IV Stadium, Kota Bharu, Kelantan
20:45 UTC+08:00	Mohd Norfarhan Mohamad 16'; Onyekachi Nwoha 71'

Tuesday 27 March	T-Team FC (Terengganu)	1–2	Kedah FA	Sultan Ismail Nasiruddin Shah Stadium, Kuala Terengganu, Terengganu
20:45 UTC+08:00	Azrul Hazran 69'		Hamidan Mohammed 65' 81'

=== Semi-finals ===
The first leg matches will be played on 21 April 2012, with the second legs to be held on 1 May 2012.

Team 1	Agg.	Team 2	1st leg	2nd leg
Terengganu FA	1–2	(Kuala Lumpur) Sime Darby FC	1–2	0 – 0
Kelantan FA	3 – 3 (a)	Kedah FA	1–1	2 – 2

==== First leg ====
Saturday 21 April	Terengganu FA	1–2	(Kuala Lumpur) Sime Darby FC	Sultan Ismail Nasiruddin Shah Stadium, Kuala Terengganu, Terengganu
20:45 UTC+08:00	Francis Forkey Doe 66'		Patrick Wleh 52'; Syukor Saidin 90+3'	Referee: Mohd Zamzaidi Katimin

Saturday 21 April	Kelantan FA	1–1	Kedah FA	Sultan Mohammad IV Stadium, Kota Bharu, Kelantan
20:45 UTC+08:00	Norshahrul Idlan Talaha 17'		Vedran Gerc 30'	Referee: Shukri Nor

==== Second leg ====
Tuesday 1 May	Sime Darby FC (Kuala Lumpur)	0–0	Terengganu FA	Majlis Perbandaran Selayang Stadium, Selayang, Selangor
20:45 UTC+08:00				Referee: Mohd Nafeez Abdul Wahab

Tuesday 1 May	Kedah FA	2–2	Kelantan FA	Darul Aman Stadium, Alor Setar, Kedah
20:45 UTC+08:00	Khyril 31' 43'		Obinna 47'; Ghaddar 60'	Attendance: 30,000; Referee: Mohd. Yusof Md. Karim

=== Final ===
The final was played at National Stadium, Bukit Jalil, Kuala Lumpur, on Saturday, 19 May 2012.

Saturday 19 May
20:45 UTC+08:00

Sime Darby FC (Kuala Lumpur)	0–1	Kelantan FA
		Ghaddar 59' (pen.)

National Stadium, Bukit Jalil, Kuala Lumpur
Attendance: 85,000
Referee: Suhaizi Shukri

== Winners ==
2012 Piala FA Winner

Kelantan

1st Title

== Season statistics ==
=== Top scorers ===
Rank	Player	Club	Goals
1	(Liberia) Patrick Wleh	Sime Darby FC	6
2	(Malaysia) Mohd Norfarhan Mohamad	Kelantan FA	5
2	(Brazil) Arthuro Henrique Bernhardt	Johor FC	5
4	(Malaysia) Mohd Khyril Muhymeen Zambri	Kedah FA	4
5	(Malaysia) Fauzi Abdul Kadar	Betaria FC	2
5	(Malaysia) Ahmad Fauzi Shaari	Johor FC	2
5	(Ghana) Hamidan Mohammed	Kedah FA	2
5	(Malaysia) Indra Putra Mahayuddin	Kelantan FA	2
5	(Malaysia) Mohd Badri Mohd Radzi	Kelantan FA	2
5	(Lebanon) Mohammed Ghaddar	Kelantan FA	2
5	(Malaysia) Safiq Rahim	Selangor FA	2
5	(Malaysia) Fadzly iskandar	SPA FC	2
5	(Malaysia) Zulkifli Affendi	SPA FC	2
5	(Malaysia) Abdul Manaf Mamat	Terengganu FA	2
5	(Malaysia) Azrul Hazran	PBDKT T-Team FC	2
5	(Malaysia) Khairul Izwan	PBDKT T-Team FC	2
17	(Malaysia) Mohd Saufi Ibrahim	Betaria FC	1
17	(Malaysia) S.Harivarman	Betaria FC	1
17	(Malaysia) Mohd Ashaari Shamsuddin	Terengganu FA	1
17	(Malaysia) Abdul Hadi Yahya	Terengganu FA	1
17	(Malaysia) Joseph Kalang Tie	Terengganu FA	1
17	(Liberia) Francis Forkey Doe	Terengganu FA	1
17	(Malaysia) Zairo Anuar Zalani	PBDKT T-Team FC	1
17	(Malaysia) Mohd Fadzli Saari	PBDKT T-Team FC	1
17	(Malaysia) Mohd Faiz Subri	PBDKT T-Team FC	1
17	(Malaysia) Mohd Azamuddin Md Akil	Pahang FA	1
17	(Malaysia) Hafiz kamal	Pahang FA	1
17	(Malaysia) Hazuan Daud	Pahang FA	1
17	(Malaysia) Khairool Anas	Perlis FA	1
17	(Malaysia) Mohd Nazrin Baharuddin	Perlis FA	1
17	(Malaysia) Mohd Rizal Gahazali	Perlis FA	1
17	(Sierra Leone) Henry Lewis	Perlis FA	1
17	(Malaysia) Lamin Conteh	Perlis FA	1
17	(Malaysia) Amar Rohidan	kedah FA	1
17	(France) Abdulfatah Safi	kedah FA	1
17	(Croatia) Vedran Gerc	kedah FA	1
17	(Malaysia) Norshahrul Idlan Talaha	Kelantan FA	1
17	(Nigeria) Obinna Nwaneri	Kelantan FA	1
17	(Nigeria) Onyekachi Nwoha	Kelantan FA	1
17	(Malaysia) Mohd Amri Yahyah	Selangor FA	1
17	(Malaysia) Mohd Asraruddin Putra Omar	Selangor FA	1
17	(Malaysia) Azidan Sarudin	Selangor FA	1
17	(Croatia) Boško Balaban	Selangor FA	1
17	(Malaysia) Nazrin Syamsul Bahri	PKNS FC	1
17	(Singapore) Madhu Mohana	Singapore LIONSXII	1
17	(Singapore) Shahril Ishak	Singapore LIONSXII	1
17	(Singapore) Shaiful Esah	Singapore LIONSXII	1
17	(Singapore) Sufian Anuar	Singapore LIONSXII	1
17	(Slovakia) Michal Kubala	Perak FA	1
17	(Malaysia) Mohd Azizan Baba	Sarawak FA	1
17	(Malaysia) Mohd Irme Mat	Sime Darby FC	1
17	(Malaysia) Azmirul Azmi	Sime Darby FC	1
17	(Malaysia) Razali Umar Kandasamy	Sime Darby FC	1
17	(Malaysia) Syukor Saidin	Sime Darby FC	1
17	(Cambodia) Phanny Ratha	Preah Khan Reach	1
17	(Cambodia) Prak Mony Udom	Preah Khan Reach	1
17	(Malaysia) Fahkrul Aiman	Pos Malaysia FC	1
17	(Malaysia) Afiq Azmi	Kuala Lumpur FA	1
17	(Malaysia) Arman fareez Ali	Kuala Lumpur FA	1
17	(Malaysia) Fazuan Abdullah	Kuala Lumpur FA	1
17	(Malaysia) Khairul Anuar Shafie	Kuala Lumpur FA	1
17	(Malaysia) Fazuan Abdullah	Kuala Lumpur FA	1
17	(Malaysia) Shafiq Zahari	SPA FC	1
17	(Cameroon) Jean-Emmanuel Effa Owona	Negeri Sembilan FA	1
17	(Malaysia) Hasmawi Hassan	Penang FA	1
17	(Malaysia) Afzan Zainal Abidin	USM FC	1
17	(Uganda) Edrisar Kaye	USM FC	1

== See also ==
- 2012 Malaysia Super League
- 2012 Malaysia Premier League
- 2012 Malaysia FAM League
