= 2012 in Malaysian football =

Football in Malaysia
- Season: 2012

Men's football
- Super League: Kelantan
- Premier League: ATM
- FAM League: KL SPA
- FA Cup: Kelantan
- Malaysia Cup: Kelantan
- Community Shield: Negeri Sembilan

The 2012 season was the 33rd season of competitive football in Malaysia.

The season began in January 2012 for the FAM League, Premier League and Super League.

== Promotion and relegation (pre-season) ==
Teams relegated from Super League

- Sarawak FA
- Kedah FA
- Sabah FA
- Kuala Lumpur FA

Teams promoted to Super League

- Angkatan Tentera Malaysia
- Pahang FA

Teams relegated from Premier League

- Betaria FC
- Perlis FA
- MBJB FC

Teams promoted to Premier League

- Suruhanjaya Perkhidmatan Awam FC

== Honours ==
=== Trophy and league champions ===
Competition	Winner	Details	At	Match Report
FA Cup	Kelantan FA	Kelantan FA beat Sime Darby FC 1–0	National Stadium, Bukit Jalil	Report
Super League	Kelantan FA			
Premier League	Angkatan Tentera Malaysia			
FAM League	Suruhanjaya Perkhidmatan Awam FC			
Charity Cup	Negeri Sembilan FA	Negeri Sembilan FA beat Kelantan FA 2–1	National Stadium, Bukit Jalil	Report

== National teams competitions ==
=== Men's senior team ===
1 February Friendly^{1}	Malaysia	5–0	Kelantan FA	Kuala Lumpur, Malaysia
	Asraruddin 36'; Shahurain 42'; S. Kunanlan 65'; Abdul Hadi 78'; Izuan 90'	Report		Stadium: National Stadium, Bukit Jalil; Attendance: 30,000

24 February Friendly^{1}	Sabah FA	0–1	Malaysia	Kota Kinabalu, Sabah, Malaysia
		Report	Amar 79'	Stadium: Likas Stadium; Attendance: 35,000

29 February Friendly	Philippines	1–1	Malaysia	Manila, Philippines
	Wolf 34'	Report	Shakir 90+1'	Stadium: Rizal Memorial Stadium; Attendance: 11,000

24 March Friendly^{1}	Sarawak FA	1–1	Malaysia	Kuching, Sarawak, Malaysia
	Joël 68'	Report	Venice 65'	Stadium: Sarawak State Stadium

28 April Friendly	Malaysia	6–0	Sri Lanka	Selangor, Malaysia
	Wan Zack Haikal 25', 26'; Hazwan 73', 83', 90'; Azamuddin 86'	Report		Stadium: Shah Alam Stadium; Attendance: 10,000

28 May Friendly^{1}	Malaysia	2–1	(Kuala Lumpur) Felda United FC	Kuala Lumpur, Malaysia
	Shahurain 14'; Amar 70'	Report	Abdul Ghani 88'	Stadium: Wisma FAM; Attendance: 30

1 June Friendly	Malaysia	0–0	Philippines	Selangor, Malaysia
		Report		Stadium: Shah Alam Stadium; Attendance: 10,000

8 June Friendly	Singapore	2–2	Malaysia	Kallang, Singapore
	Shahdan 87'; Qiu Li 90+3'	Report	Azamuddin 43'; Safiq 60'	Stadium: Jalan Besar Stadium; Referee: Ng Kai Lam (Hong Kong)

12 June Friendly	Malaysia	2–0	Singapore	Selangor, Malaysia
	Shakir 19'; Safiq 61'	Report		Stadium: Shah Alam Stadium; Referee: Teetichai Nualjan (Thailand)

11 September Friendly	Malaysia	0–2	Vietnam	Shah Alam, Malaysia
		Report	Lê Công Vinh 32'; Phan Thanh Hưng 48'	Stadium: Shah Alam Stadium; Attendance: 15,000; Referee: Mohd Yussof Mat Karim (Malaysia)

20 September Friendly^{1}	Malaysia	3–0	Cambodia	Kuala Lumpur, Malaysia
	Safee Sali 51'; Zaquan Adha 62' 76'	Report		Stadium: Wisma FAM

12 October Friendly^{1}	Malaysia	6–0	(Kuala Lumpur) PDRM FA	Selangor, Malaysia
	Safee 7', 56'; Wan Zack Haikal 28', 41'; Kunalan 72'; Azamuddin 88'	Report		Stadium: Wisma FAM; Attendance: 30

16 October Friendly	Hong Kong	0–3	Malaysia	Mong Kok, Hong Kong
		Report	Safee 59'; Safiq 82'; Fakri 90+2'	Stadium: Mong Kok Stadium

30 October Friendly^{1}	Malaysia	4–0	(Kuala Lumpur) PDRM FA	Selangor, Malaysia
	Safee 30'; Safiq 45' (pen.), 86'; Wan Zack Haikal 63'	Report		Stadium: Wisma FAM

3 November Friendly	Vietnam	1–0	Malaysia	Hanoi, Vietnam
	Nguyen Trong Hoang 74'	Report		Stadium: Mỹ Đình National Stadium

7 November Friendly	Thailand	2–0	Malaysia	Nonthaburi, Thailand
	Prayad Boonya 26'; Arthit Sunthornpit 81'			Stadium: SCG Stadium; Referee: Chaiya Mahapab (Thailand)

14 November Friendly	Malaysia	1–1	Hong Kong	Shah Alam, Malaysia
20:45	Safee 58'		Lam Hok Hei 88'	Stadium: Shah Alam Stadium; Referee: Suhaizi Shukri (Malaysia)

20 November Friendly	Malaysia	1–1	Bangladesh	Kuala Lumpur, Malaysia
20:45	Khyril 22'	Report	Ameli 83' (pen.)	Stadium: National Stadium, Bukit Jalil

25 November 2012 AFF Suzuki Cup	Malaysia	0–3	Singapore	Kuala Lumpur, Malaysia
20:00 UTC+8		Report	Shahril 32', 38'; Đurić 75'	Stadium: National Stadium, Bukit Jalil; Referee: Valentin Kovalenko (Uzbekistan)

28 November 2012 AFF Suzuki Cup	Laos	1–4	Malaysia	Kuala Lumpur, Malaysia
20:00 UTC+8	Sihavong 38'	Report	Safiq 15'; Safee 67'; Wan 76'; Khyril 80'	Stadium: National Stadium, Bukit Jalil; Referee: Fan Qi (China PR)

1 December 2012 AFF Suzuki Cup	Malaysia	2–0	Indonesia	Kuala Lumpur, Malaysia
20:00 UTC+8	Azamuddin 27'; Mahali 30'	Report		Stadium: National Stadium, Bukit Jalil; Referee: Valentin Kovalenko (Uzbekistan)

9 December 2012 AFF Suzuki Cup	Malaysia	1–1	Thailand	Kuala Lumpur, Malaysia
19:00 UTC+7	Norshahrul 48'	Report	Teerasil 78'	Stadium: National Stadium, Bukit Jalil; Referee: Mohsen Torky (Iran)

13 December 2012 AFF Suzuki Cup	Thailand	2–0	Malaysia	Bangkok, Thailand
19:00 UTC+7	Teerasil 60'; Theeraton 65'	Report		Stadium: Supachalasai Stadium; Referee: Lee Min-Hu (South Korea)

- ^{1} Non FIFA 'A' international match

=== League XI ===
24 July Friendly^{XI}	Arsenal (England)	2–1	Malaysia	Kuala Lumpur, Malaysia
21:45 UTC+08:00	Eisfield 87'; Aneke 90'	Report	Azmi 45+2'	Stadium: National Stadium, Bukit Jalil

27 July Friendly^{XI}	Indonesia	0–6	Malaysia XI	Jakarta, Indonesia
21:00 UTC+07:00			Hazwan 11'; Kubala 13' (pen.); Azrif 31'; Amri 34' 45'; Shukor 62'	Stadium: Gelora Bung Karno Stadium; Attendance: 0

30 July Friendly^{XI}	Manchester City (England)	3–1	Malaysia	Kuala Lumpur, Malaysia
21:45 UTC+08:00	Agüero 17'; Tevez 48'; Johnson 52'	Report	Azamuddin 87'	Stadium: National Stadium, Bukit Jalil

=== Men's under-23 team ===
14 January Friendly	Cambodia	0–1	Malaysia	Olympic Stadium, Phnom Penh, Cambodia
		Report	Izuan 43'

31 January Friendly	Malaysia	0–0	Selangor FA	National Stadium, Bukit Jalil, Kuala Lumpur, Malaysia
20:30 UTC+08:00		Report

5 February 2012 Summer Olympics qualification Third Round	Bahrain	2–1	Malaysia	(Bahrain) Al Ahli Stadium, Manama
18:30 UTC+3	Al Alawi 25'; Farhan 88'	Report	Hazwan 76'	Attendance: 2,000; Referee: Abdulrahman Hussain (Qatar)

22 February 2012 Summer Olympics qualification Third Round	Malaysia	0–4	Japan	(Malaysia) National Stadium, Kuala Lumpur
20:00 UTC+8		Report	Sakai 35'; Osako 44'; Haraguchi 55'; Saito 60'	Attendance: 14,205; Referee: Mohamed Abdelkarim Al-Zarooni (United Arab Emirates)

14 March 2012 Summer Olympics qualification Third Round	Syria	3–0	Malaysia	(Jordan) King Abdullah Stadium, Amman
13:00 UTC+2	Mardigian 48', 68'; Al Soma 80'	Report		Attendance: 600; Referee: Mohsen Torky (Iran)

23 May Friendly	Ferencvárosi TC (Hungary)	5–0	Malaysia	Stadion Albert Flórián, Budapest, Hungary
	Syazwan 23' (o.g.); Jovanović 39'; Oláh 47', 68'; Nyilasi 86' (pen.)	Report

27 May Friendly	Brazil XI (Brazil)	2–2	Malaysia	Béke téri Stadion, Hungary
16:00 UTC+02:00	? ?	Report	Azrif (?); Hazwan 53'

30 May Friendly	Budapest Honvéd FC (Hungary)	0–0	Malaysia	Bozsik Stadion, Budapest, Hungary
16:00 UTC+02:00

5 June Friendly	Dukla Banská Bystrica (Slovakia)	2–4	Malaysia	SNP Stadium, Banská Bystrica, Slovakia

10 June Friendly	China	1–0	Malaysia	Wuhan Stadium, China
	Yang Yihu 45'

17 June Friendly	Malaysia	2–0	Qatar	Shah Alam Stadium, Selangor, Malaysia
20:45 UTC+08:00

23 June 2013 AFC U-22 Championship Qualification	Malaysia	2–3	South Korea	(Myanmar) Thuwunna Stadium, Yangon, Burma
15:15 UTC+6:30	Arasu 8', 62'	Report	Kim Hyun-Hun 13'; Pak Kwang-Il 32'; Jeong Jong-Hee 34'	Attendance: 1,500; Referee: Ali Sabbagh (Lebanon)

25 June 2013 AFC U-22 Championship Qualification	Malaysia	7–0	Philippines	(Myanmar) Bogyoke Aung San Stadium, Yangon, Burma
15:15 UTC+6:30	Rozaimi 2', 35', 69' (pen.), 74'; Fandi 32'; Zaharulnizam 40'; Saarvindran 90+1'	Report		Attendance: 100; Referee: Timur Faizullin (Kyrgyzstan)

28 June 2013 AFC U-22 Championship Qualification	Chinese Taipei	2–4	Malaysia	(Myanmar) Bogyoke Aung San Stadium, Yangon, Burma
15:15 UTC+6:30	Lin Chang-lun 50'; Wen Chih-hao 90+3'	Report	Rozaimi 8', 41'; Chen Yen-jui 33' (o.g.); Saarvindran 78'	Attendance: 150; Referee: Fahad Al-Mirdasi (Saudi Arabia)

30 June 2013 AFC U-22 Championship Qualification	Vietnam	0–3	Malaysia	(Myanmar) Bogyoke Aung San Stadium, Yangon, Burma
15:15 UTC+6:30		Report	Rozaimi 53', 90+2', 90+4'	Attendance: 100; Referee: Wang Di (China)

3 July 2013 AFC U-22 Championship Qualification	Malaysia	1–2	Myanmar	(Myanmar) Thuwunna Stadium, Yangon, Burma
18:15 UTC+6:30	Rozaimi 90+1' (pen.)	Report	Kaung Si Thu 34', 53'	Attendance: 28,000; Referee: Ali Sabbagh (Lebanon)

5 September Friendly	Malaysia	4–1	Brunei	UiTM Stadium, Selangor, Malaysia
	Thamil Arasu 8'; Wan Zaharulnizam 25'; Saarvindran 65'; Ferris Danial 78'	Report	Julremi Zaini 43'

9 September 2012 SCTV Cup	Indonesia	0–1	Malaysia	Gelora Bung Karno, Indonesia
19:00 UTC+07:00		Report	K. Reuben 42'	Attendance: 5,000; Referee: Faulur Rosy (Indonesia)

== League tables ==
=== Super League ===
Pos	Team	Pld	W	D	L	GF	GA	GD	Pts	Qualification or relegation
1	Kelantan (C, Q)	26	18	6	2	53	18	+35	60	2013 AFC Cup group stage
2	LionsXII (Note: LionsXII are not eligible for any AFC competition spots)	26	15	5	6	48	23	+25	50	
3	Selangor (Q)	26	12	7	7	40	26	+14	43	2013 AFC Cup group stage (Note: Qualified as the next highest-placed local team behind Liga Super and 2012 Piala FA winners Kelantan.)
4	Perak	26	13	3	10	40	43	−3	42	
5	Terengganu	26	11	8	7	41	33	+8	41	
6	Negeri Sembilan	26	10	7	9	41	38	+3	37	
7	PKNS	26	8	11	7	35	35	0	35	
8	T-Team	26	10	5	11	35	36	−1	35	
9	Johor FC	26	10	5	11	29	31	−2	35	
10	Felda United	26	11	2	13	25	31	−6	35	
11	Sarawak (R)	26	8	6	12	28	32	−4	30	Relegation play-offs
12	Kedah (R)	26	7	7	12	27	38	−11	28	Relegation play-offs
13	Sabah (R)	26	7	7	12	33	52	−19	28	Relegation play-offs
14	Kuala Lumpur (R)	26	0	5	21	14	53	−39	5	Relegation to 2013 Liga Premier

Source: RSSSF
Rules for classification: 1) points; 2) goal difference; 3) number of goals scored
(C) Champions; (Q) Qualified for the phase indicated; (R) Relegated

=== Premier League ===
Pos	Team	Pld	W	D	L	GF	GA	GD	Pts	Promotion or relegation
1	ATM (C, P)	22	17	3	2	73	20	+53	54	Promotion to 2013 Liga Super
2	Pahang (O, P)	22	14	4	4	60	29	+31	46	Promotion to 2013 Liga Super/Liga Premier Play-off round
3	Sime Darby	22	14	3	5	54	19	+35	45	
4	Johor	22	12	5	5	47	23	+24	41	
5	PDRM	22	11	5	6	50	38	+12	38	
6	USM	22	11	3	8	41	35	+6	36	
7	Pos Malaysia (O)	22	8	6	8	32	31	+1	30	2013 Liga Premier/Liga FAM Play-off round
8	Harimau Muda B (Note: Harimau Muda B will not be relegated, thus if they finish anywhere within relegation zone, the 7th place team will be demoted to 2013 Liga Premier/Liga FAM Play-off round. They also cannot be promoted to 2013 Liga Super.)	22	7	3	12	33	37	−4	24	
9	MP Muar	22	6	3	13	36	67	−31	21	2013 Liga Premier/Liga FAM Play-off round
10	Betaria (O)	22	6	2	14	23	59	−36	20	2013 Liga Premier/Liga FAM Play-off round
11	Perlis (R)	22	4	3	15	38	68	−30	15	Relegation to 2013 Liga FAM
12	MB Johor Bahru (R)	22	1	2	19	18	79	−61	5	Relegation to 2013 Liga FAM

Updated to match(es) played on 13 July 2012. Source: Liga Premier
Rules for classification: 1) points; 2) goal difference; 3) number of goals scored.
(C) Champions; (O) Play-off winners; (P) Promoted; (R) Relegated

=== FAM League ===
Pos	Team	Pld	W	D	L	GF	GA	GD	Pts	Promotion
1	KL SPA FC (C, P)	16	12	2	2	28	9	+19	38	Promotion to 2013 Malaysia Premier League
2	Shahzan Muda FC	16	11	1	4	30	15	+15	34	Promotion to 2013 Malaysia FAM League Play-off round
3	UiTM FC	16	10	4	2	22	9	+13	34	Promotion to 2013 Malaysia Premier League
4	PBAPP FC	16	8	3	5	27	14	+13	27	
5	Tentera Darat F.A.	16	6	4	6	27	17	+10	22	
6	Penang FA	16	6	0	10	20	24	−4	18	
7	Malacca FA	16	5	1	10	20	25	−5	16	
8	Melodi Jaya S.C.	16	3	3	10	12	34	−22	12	Withdrew from FAM League and dissolved.
9	SDM Navy Kepala Batas FC	16	1	2	13	11	50	−39	5	Withdrew from FAM League and dissolved.

Updated to match(es) played on 1 July 2012. Source: Malaysia Football Dimos
Rules for classification: 1) points; 2) goal difference; 3) number of goals scored.
(C) Champions; (P) Promoted

=== President Cup ===
The final was played at Perak Stadium, Perak on Tuesday, 26 July 2011.

21 June
20:45 UTC+08:00

Perak FA	1–0	(Negeri Sembilan) Betaria FC
Nurridzuan 45'	Report

Perak Stadium, Perak
Attendance: 6,000

== Domestic Cups ==
=== Charity Shield ===
The 2011 edition was played at National Stadium, Bukit Jalil, Kuala Lumpur on Saturday, 7 January 2012.

7 January
20:45 UTC+08:00

Kelantan FA	1–2	Negeri Sembilan FA
Norshahrul 19'	Report	Effa Owona 30', 63'

National Stadium, Bukit Jalil, Kuala Lumpur
Attendance: 40,000

Malaysia Charity Shield 2012 winner

1st Charity Shield title

=== FA Cup ===
The final was played at National Stadium, Bukit Jalil, Kuala Lumpur, on Saturday, 19 May 2011.

19 May
20:45 UTC+08:00

Sime Darby FC (Kuala Lumpur)	0–1	Kelantan FA
	Report	Ghaddar 59' (pen.)

National Stadium, Bukit Jalil, Kuala Lumpur
Attendance: 85,000
Referee: Suhaizi Shukri

Malaysia FA Cup 2012 winner

1st FA Cup title

=== Malaysia Cup ===
The final was played on 20 October 2012 at the Shah Alam Stadium, Shah Alam in Selangor, Malaysia.

20 October
20:45 UTC+08:00

ATM FA	2–3 (a.e.t.)	Kelantan FA
Rezal Zambery 49'; Marlon 62'		Norshahrul 44' 50'; Indra Putra 96'

Shah Alam Stadium, Selangor, Malaysia
Attendance: 80,925
Referee: Nafeez Abdul Wahab (Johor)

2012 Malaysia Cup winner

2nd title

== Coaching changes ==
=== Super League ===
Club	Outgoing Head Coach	Date of vacancy	Manner of departure	Incoming Head Coach	Date of appointment
Kelantan FA	(Malaysia) Maruthaiah Karathu	16 October 2011	Resigned	(England) Peter James Butler	20 October 2011
Johor FC	(Malaysia) Azuan Zain	3 November 2011	Resigned	(Malaysia) K. Devan	3 November 2011
Terengganu FA	(Malaysia) Irfan Bakti Abu Salim	2 November 2011	End of Contract	(Malaysia) Mat Zan Mat Aris	4 November 2011
Selangor FA	(Malaysia) P. Maniam	4 November 2011	End of caretaker role	(Malaysia) Irfan Bakti Abu Salim	4 November 2011
Kelantan FA	(England) Peter James Butler	28 February 2012	Mutual Agreement	(Croatia) Bojan Hodak	2 March 2012
Johor FC	(Malaysia) K. Devan	15 April 2012	Resigned	(Malaysia) Sazali Saidon	15 April 2012
Terengganu FA	(Malaysia) Mat Zan Mat Aris	7 May 2012	Resigned	(Malaysia) Khalid Mohd Dahan (caretaker)	7 May 2012
Terengganu FA	(Malaysia) Khalid Mohd Dahan (caretaker)	14 May 2012	End of caretaker role	(England) Peter James Butler	14 May 2012
Sabah FA	(Malaysia) Justin Ganai	20 June 2012	Sacked	(Malaysia) Andrew Majanggim (caretaker)	20 June 2012
Sabah FA	(Malaysia) Andrew Majanggim (caretaker)	5 July 2012	End of caretaker role	(Northern Ireland) David McCreery	5 July 2012
Perak FA	(Malaysia) Norizan Bakar	10 July 2012	Leave of Absence	(South Korea) Jang Jung	23 July 2012
Kedah FA	(Malaysia) Wan Jamak Wan Hassan	10 August 2012	Leave of Absence	(Croatia) Mario Tot	10 August 2012

=== Premier League ===
Club	Outgoing Head Coach	Date of vacancy	Manner of departure	Incoming Head Coach	Date of appointment
Perlis FA	(Malaysia) Abdullah Hassan	31 May 2012	Resigned	(Malaysia) Robert Scully	5 June 2012
