= Shahrom Kalam =

Malaysian footballer

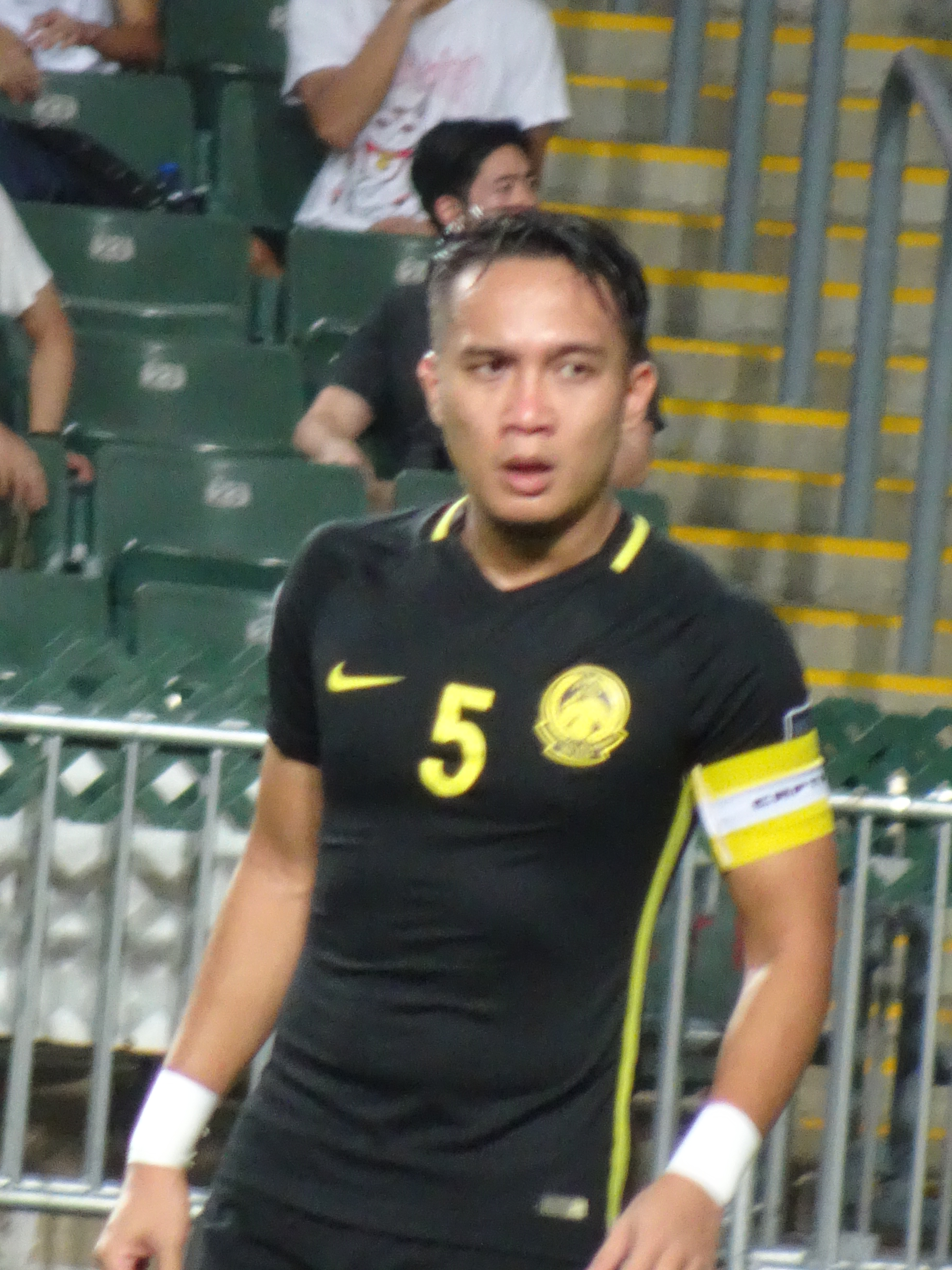
- Shahrom playing for Malaysia in 2017

Personal information
- Full name: Muhammad Shahrom bin Abdul Kalam
- Date of birth: 15 September 1985 (age 41)
- Place of birth: Kuala Lumpur, Malaysia
- Height: 1.78 m (5 ft 10 in)
- Positions: Centre back; right-back

Team information
- Current team: Selangor (assistant)

Youth career
- 2004–2005: Kuala Lumpur

Senior career*
Years	Team	Apps	(Gls)
2005–2006	Kuala Lumpur		
2007–2008	Shahzan Muda		
2008–2011	Kuala Lumpur	21	(0)
2012–2013	Perak		
2014–2016	Selangor		
2017	Perak	17	(0)
2018	Felcra		
2019	PKNS	6	(0)
2020	Negeri Sembilan		

International career^{‡}
2011–2017	Malaysia	21	(0)

Managerial career
- 2024: Gombak
- 2024–: Selangor (assistant)
- * Club domestic league appearances and goals ‡ National team caps and goals as of 19 September 2017

Muhammad Shahrom bin Abdul Kalam (born 15 September 1985) is a retired Malaysian footballer. He played mainly as a centre-back, but can also deployed at right-back.

== Club career ==
=== Early career ===
Shahrom began his football career with under the strong guidance and encouragement of his parents and family, Abdul Kalam Suhaimi and Shariah Abdul Wahid and his 3 siblings. It was Shahrom's mother who first realised that Shahrom's intense passion to play football seriously when he was 7. Shahrom's mother acted as his unofficial coach, trainer and manager during his early days of playing football and he has never looked back since then. His mother who also managed and coached the rag tag street football team that Shahrom and a couple of his childhood friends were in.

Shahrom played all through his years in primary school years developing and polishing his talents. During his early secondary school years, Shahrom was recruited in Kuala Lumpur Football Academy which was based at the Cheras Football Stadium. His stint with Kuala Lumpur Football Academy opened many doors for Shahrom to polish his skills and talent on the field which ultimately resulted in him being recruited to join the illustrious Bukit Jalil Sports School.

=== Kuala Lumpur, Shahzan Muda ===
Shahrom began his football career playing for Kuala Lumpur youth team before been promoted into the first team in 2005. Shahrom played for Malaysia Premier League side Shahzan Muda for 2007-08 season before returning to Kuala Lumpur in 2009.

In December 2011, Shahrom signed a contract with Perak.

=== Selangor ===
Shahrom joined Selangor in the 2014 Malaysia Super League after his contract was terminated by Perak. He was immediately named captain by Mehmet Durakovic. In 2015, he led his team to the final match of the 2015 Malaysia Cup after defeating Pahang 2–0 in the Shah Alam Stadium. And later to clinch the cup by beating Kedah in final with 2–0 in the same venue.

=== Perak ===
On 19 December 2016, Shahrom rejoins Perak for a second stint. He made his Malaysia Super League debut for Perak in a 1–1 draw against Pahang in Perak Stadium.

=== Felcra ===
On 29 December 2017, Shahrom signed a contract with Malaysia Premier League club Felcra. Shahrom played the role of Captain and during his stint rallied to elevate Felcra as one of the best team in Malaysian Premier League 2018 thus qualifying Felcra for Malaysia Super League 2019. Felcra did not have the chance to prove their mettle in Malaysia Super League since the club was disbanded after even after they qualified to move from Malaysia Premier League to the Super League.

== International career ==
Shahrom made his debut for Malaysia national team, when he enters the friendly match against Hong Kong as a substitute on 3 June 2011.

== Managerial career ==
In June 2024, Shahrom was appointed as the head coach of Malaysia A1 Semi-Pro League club Gombak.

On 10 October 2024, he returned to his former club Selangor to become the assistant coach.

== Career statistics ==
=== Club ===
As of 13 July 2018

Appearances and goals by club, season and competition
Club	Season	League			Cup		League Cup		Continental		Total	
Club	Season	Division	Apps	Goals	Apps	Goals	Apps	Goals	Apps	Goals	Apps	Goals
Shahzan Muda	2007-08	Malaysia Premier League	0	0	0	0	0	0	–		0	0
Shahzan Muda	Total		0	0	0	0	0	0	–		0	0
Kuala Lumpur	2009	Malaysia Premier League	0	0	0	0	0	0	–		0	0
Kuala Lumpur	2010	Malaysia Super League	0	0	0	0	0	0	–		25	0
Kuala Lumpur	2011	Malaysia Super League	21	0	4	0	6	1	–		31	1
Kuala Lumpur	Total		0	0	0	0	0	0	–		0	0
Perak	2012	Malaysia Super League	0	1	0	0	0	0	–		0	0
Perak	2013	Malaysia Super League	0	1	0	0	0	0	–		0	0
Perak	Total		0	2	0	0	0	0	–		0	0
Selangor	2014	Malaysia Super League	15	0	0	0	6	0	5	0	26	0
Selangor	2015	Malaysia Super League	18	1	1	0	11	0	–		30	1
Selangor	2016	Malaysia Super League	13	0	2	0	1	0	6	0	22	0
Selangor	Total		46	1	3	0	18	0	11	0	76	1
Perak	2017	Malaysia Super League	17	0	1	0	9	0	–		27	0
Perak	Total		17	0	1	0	9	0	–	–	27	0
Felcra	2018	Malaysia Premier League	14	2	1	0	0	0	–		15	2
Felcra	Total		14	2	1	0	0	0	–	–	15	3
Career Total			0	0	0	0	0	0	–	–	0	0

=== International ===
As of 13 November 2017

Appearances and goals by national team and year
National team	Year	Apps	Goals
Malaysia	2011	1	0
Malaysia	2016	12	0
Malaysia	2017	8	0
Total		21	0

== Honours ==
=== Club ===
Selangor

- Malaysia Cup: 2015

=== International ===
Malaysia U-19

- AFF U-19 Youth Championship: 2003 runner-up

Sporting positions
Preceded by Mohd Bunyamin Umar	Selangor FA captain 2015–2016	Succeeded by Mohd Razman Roslan
