= Gurusamy Kandasamy =

Malaysian footballer (born 1989)

Gurusamy Govandar
Personal information
- Full name: Gurusamy Govandar a/l Kandasamy
- Date of birth: 11 January 1989 (age 37)
- Place of birth: Selangor, Malaysia
- Height: 1.73 m (5 ft 8 in)
- Position: Midfielder

Youth career
- 2002–2008: Bukit Jalil Sports School

Senior career*
Years	Team	Apps	(Gls)
2008–2009	Harimau Muda	26	(7)
2010–2011	Harimau Muda A	14	(3)
2012–2015	Selangor	53	(4)
2016	Sarawak	9	(1)
2017–2019	PKNS	42	(0)
2020–2022	Petaling Jaya City	25	(1)
2023–2025	Bunga Raya Damansara		

International career^{‡}
2008–2009	Malaysia U19	16	(0)
2009–2010	Malaysia U21	17	(0)
2009–2012	Malaysia U23	4	(0)
2009–2013	Malaysia	14	(0)
Medal record
Malaysia under-23
Sea Games
Gold medal – first place	Sea Games 2009	Football
Gold medal – first place	Sea Games 2011	Football
Malaysia
Asean Football Championship
Winner	AFF Suzuki Cup 2010	2010
- * Club domestic league appearances and goals ‡ National team caps and goals as of 24 January 2017

Gurusamy Govandar a/l Kandasamy (born 11 January 1989) is a Malaysian professional footballer who plays as a midfielder.

== Club career ==
=== Selangor ===
For the 2012 Malaysia Super League, Gurusamy officially joined Selangor. He joined the team at the same time that his older brother, Depan Sakwati were transferred from Selangor to Sarawak.

=== PKNS ===
On 2 December 2016, it was announced that Gurusamy agreed to join PKNS for the 2017 Malaysia Super League season.

== International career ==
He has played for the Malaysian national football team, and in summer 2009 he played twice against Manchester United in their preseason tour of the Far East. He is a first cousin of Ranjith Gurusamy who plays hurling and football for the Cork senior teams in Ireland and who has represented the Ireland national team at underage level.

In November 2010, Gurusamy was called up to the Malaysia national squad by coach K. Rajagopal for the 2010 AFF Suzuki Cup. Malaysia won the 2010 AFF Suzuki Cup title for the first time in their history.

== Career statistics ==
=== Club ===
As of 12 September 2021

Appearances and goals by club, season and competition
Club	Season	League			Cup		League Cup		Continental		Total	
Club	Season	Division	Apps	Goals	Apps	Goals	Apps	Goals	Apps	Goals	Apps	Goals
Selangor	2012	Malaysia Super League	9	1	0	0	0	0	–	–	9	1
Selangor	2013	Malaysia Super League	0	2	0	0	0	0	6	0	0	2
Selangor	2014	Malaysia Super League	9	0	2	0	0	0	3	0	14	0
Selangor	2015	Malaysia Super League	13	1	2	0	5	0	–		20	1
Selangor	Total		53	4	4	0	5	0	9	0	71	4
Sarawak	2016	Malaysia Super League	9	1	1	0	0	0	–	–	10	1
Sarawak	Total		9	1	1	0	0	0	0	0	10	1
PKNS	2017	Malaysia Super League	11	0	1	0	3	0	–	–	15	0
PKNS	2018	Malaysia Super League	15	0	3	1	6	0	–	–	24	1
PKNS	2019	Malaysia Super League	16	0	2	1	0	0	–	–	18	1
PKNS	Total		42	0	6	2	9	0	0	0	57	2
Petaling Jaya City	2020	Malaysia Super League	9	1	–	–	–	–	–	–	9	1
Petaling Jaya City	2021	Malaysia Super League	16	0	0	0	0	0	–	–	16	0
Petaling Jaya City	Total		25	1	0	0	0	0	0	0	25	1
Career Total			0	0	0	0	0	0	0	0	0	0

=== International ===
As of 22 March 2017.

Malaysia national team
Year	Apps	Goals
2009	1	0
2010	1	0
2011	2	0
2012	4	0
2013	6	0
Total	14	0

== Honours ==
=== Club ===
Harimau Muda

- Malaysia Premier League : 2009

Selangor

- Malaysia Cup : 2015

=== International ===
Malaysia U-20

- AFF U-20 Youth Championship : 2007 runner-up

Malaysia U-23

- SEA Games (2): 2009, 2011

Malaysia

- AFF Championship : 2010
