= Evaldo (footballer, born 1983) =

Brazilian footballer

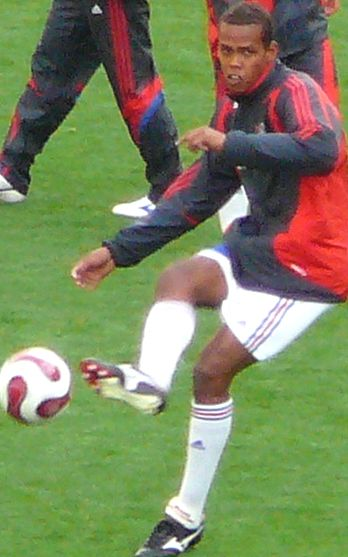

Personal information
- Full name: Evaldo Silva dos Santos
- Date of birth: 4 January 1983 (age 43)
- Place of birth: Janaúba-MG, Brazil
- Height: 1.91 m (6 ft 3 in)
- Position: Central defender

Youth career
- 2003: Portuguesa-SP

Senior career*
Years	Team	Apps	(Gls)
2004–2005	São Caetano	18	(0)
2005	→ América-SP (Loan)	14	(0)
2005	Marília	16	(1)
2006	Vila Nova-GO	6	(0)
2006	→ Grêmio (Loan)	26	(3)
2007–2009	FC Tokyo	0	(0)
2008	→ Santos (Loan)	8	(0)
2008–2009	→ Coritiba (Loan)	9	(1)
2009	Bahia	18	(1)
2009	Ponte Preta	16	(0)
2010	Criciúma	14	(1)
2011	Novo Hamburgo	19	(1)
2012	Murici	6	(0)
2012–2013	Tarxien Rainbows	11	(5)
2013–2014	Villa Nova-MG	18	(3)
2014	Brasil de Pelotas	5	(0)
2014	Selangor FA	5	(0)
2015	Mamoré	0	(0)
2016–2017	Brasil de Pelotas	19	(0)
2018	Joinville	0	(0)
2018	Montes Claros		
2019	CRAC	0	(0)
- * Club domestic league appearances and goals

Evaldo Silva dos Santos (born 4 January 1983), or simply Evaldo, is a Brazilian former football central defender.

== Honours ==
- Brazil cup 500: 2001
- São Paulo State League: 2004
- Rio Grande do Sul State League: 2006
- Runner-up champion act of the state of Bahia 2009
- Vice champion of the Brazilian championship series C 2010
- champion of the interior of the state Minas Gerais 2013
- champion of the interior of the state Rio Grande do sul 2014
