= Mohd Amri Yahyah =

Malaysian footballer

Amri Yahyah
Personal information
- Full name: Mohd Amri bin Yahyah
- Date of birth: 21 January 1981 (age 45)
- Place of birth: Tanjung Karang, Selangor, Malaysia
- Height: 1.74 m (5 ft 9 in)
- Positions: Forward; attacking midfielder

Team information
- Current team: PT Athletic
- Number: 17

Youth career
- 1995–2000: Selangor

Senior career*
Years	Team	Apps	(Gls)
2001–2013	Selangor	210	(71)
2014–2016	Johor Darul Ta'zim	54	(10)
2017	Melaka United	12	(1)
2017–2019	Selangor	44	(8)
2020	Sarawak United	11	(2)
2021–2023	Sabah	56	(9)
2024	PT Athletic	1	(0)

International career^{‡}
2004–2017	Malaysia	64	(15)
Medal record
Men's football
Representing Malaysia
AFF Championship
Winner	AFF Suzuki Cup 2010	2010
Runner-up	AFF Suzuki Cup 2014	2014
- * Club domestic league appearances and goals ‡ National team caps and goals as of 21 December 2017

Mohd Amri bin Yahyah also known as Amri Yahyah (born 21 January 1981) is a former Malaysian professional footballer who last played for Malaysia A1 Semi-Pro League club PT Athletic. He has also represented the Malaysian national team. Amri plays mainly as a forward, but also as an attacking midfielder.

Amri spent most of his successful career at Selangor where he made 427 appearances, scoring 138 goals. He had another successful career with Johor Darul Ta'zim from 2014 until 2016 making 103 appearances scoring 22 goals.

On 16 December 2023, Amri announced his retirement via Sabah's social media. The 2023 Malaysia Super League final match against Kedah Darul Aman was to be his last as a professional footballer. Amri has played more than 600 matches in his career, scoring 188 goals for club and country. However he came out of retirement in May 2024 to play for Malaysia second division club PT Athletic.

== Club career ==
=== Selangor ===
Born in Tanjung Karang, Selangor, Amri signed a contract with Selangor F.C. in 2001 and helped the outfit to the treble (Premier League Malaysia, Malaysian FA Cup and Malaysia Cup) in 2005.

Amri became a cult hero when he scored a golden goal against Sabah in the 2002 Malaysia Cup Final. He was made the Selangor team captain in the 2009 Malaysia Super League campaign.

Amri is a versatile player, having played in a number of different positions including as a defender, winger, defensive and attacking midfielder, and striker.

=== Johor Darul Ta'zim ===
Amri completed his transfer to Johor Darul Ta'zim for 2014 season of Malaysia Super League, with a monthly salary reported to be around RM 85,000. Johor Darul Ta'zim became the Malaysian Super League champions, narrowly overtaking Amri's former club Selangor by a mere 3 points on the last day of the league.

Even after his transfer, Amri remained popular with the Selangor fans until his ultimate faux pas - celebrating a goal against Selangor by dancing in full view of its supporters. It was rumoured that he did this to spite the Football Association of Selangor. Selangor went on to win the game 4–1. He later apologised, which Selangor fans spurned, as he was booed upon his return to Shah Alam Stadium to face Selangor. Some furious supporters even tossed bottles at him when he came over to the Selangor section to applaud them. Amri reportedly shed tears after that insult. However, he remains hugely popular with Malaysian fans in general.

=== Melaka United ===
On 16 December 2016, Amri signed a one-year contract with newly promoted club Melaka United for an undisclosed fee after his contract with Johor Darul Ta'zim expired. On 21 February 2017, Amri made his debut for Melaka United in a 2–0 win over Kelantan playing for 90 minutes. On 14 February 2017, Amri scored a winning goal for his side in Malaysia FA Cup campaign over PKNS.

=== Return to Selangor ===
In May 2017, Melaka United announced that Amri Yahyah was returning to his former club Selangor in the mid-season transfer window. Amri made his league debut in 0–2 defeat against Pahang on 24 May 2017. Amri scored his league goal on 22 July 2017 in a 1–0 win over Kelantan. His second league goal came from 2–1 win over Johor Darul Ta'zim on 5 August 2017.

Amri Yahyah departed Selangor at the end of the 2019 season.

=== Sarawak United ===
At the end of January 2020, Amri joined the Sarawak United for the start of Malaysia League 2020 season.

=== Sabah ===
During the 2021 transfer window, Amri, now 40, signed for Sabah on 18 February 2021. It makes the twentieth seasons for Amri in the domestic competition.

On 25 April 2022, during the Malaysian Super League match against Kedah Darul Aman Amri set a league record by scoring a hattrick. Now aged 41, the former international started the game after injury to striker-in-chief Neto Pessoa and he repaid the faith with a hattrick in the second half. Amri rifled home the first in the 51st minute and added his second with an expertly taken shot from a tight angle 10 minutes later. The veteran striker completed his hattrick with another breathtaking effort by chipping the ball beyond the reach of opposition goalkeeper Ifwat Akmal in the 72nd minute. Coach Ong Kim Swee, said to reporters that Amri's hat-trick at the age of 41 will be difficult to emulate.

=== PT Athletic ===
On 2 May 2024, Amri came out from retirement by joining PT Athletic who compete in the Malaysia A1 Semi-Pro League in the 2024– 25 season. The participation of the 43-year-old was revealed during the club jersey launch ceremony.

== International career ==
The right-footed player represented Malaysia in the 2003 Sea Games in Hanoi, Vietnam, the Afro-Asian Games Hyderabad, India in October 2003, and also in the 2004 Tiger Cup helping Malaysia to finish third.

His first debut in senior national team was on 8 September 2004 in an action of match in 2006 FIFA World Cup qualification against China, where Malaysia lost 1–0.

In November 2010, Amri was called up to the Malaysian national squad by coach K. Rajagopal for the 2010 AFF Suzuki Cup. Amri scored twice against Laos to secure a 5–1 win. Malaysia went on to win the 2010 AFF Suzuki Cup title for the first time.

During the 2016 AFF Championship, Amri scored a brace to secure to his a 3–2 win over Cambodia on 20 November 2016.

=== Others ===
His following grew significantly after scoring a brace for Malaysia Selection in a pre-season exhibition match on 18 July 2009, against English champions Manchester United. The latter ran out 3–2 winners.

In July 2011, Amri was called up to represent Malaysia Selection against Chelsea.

On 10 August 2013, Amri once again lived up to his reputation of scoring against top foreign clubs by scoring the only Malaysian goal in a 3–1 loss to Barcelona during their 2013 Asia Tour.

== Career statistics ==
=== Club ===
As of match played 17 December 2023

Appearances and goals by club, season and competition
Club	Season	League			National cup		League cup		Others		Total	
Club	Season	Division	Apps	Goals	Apps	Goals	Apps	Goals	Apps	Goals	Apps	Goals
Selangor	2001	Liga Perdana 1	13	6	6	2	5	0	1	0	25	8
Selangor	2002	Liga Perdana 1	13	6	2	2	9	7	—		24	15
Selangor	2003	Liga Perdana 1	1	0	0	0	3	0	—		4	0
Selangor	2004	Malaysia Premier League	6	5	1	2	3	0	—		10	7
Selangor	2005	Malaysia Premier League	14	1	8	1	5	1	—		27	3
Selangor	2006	Malaysia Super League	16	2	4	0	2	0	7	1	29	3
Selangor	2007	Malaysia Super League	15	7	2	2	6	4	—		23	13
Selangor	2008	Malaysia Super League	19	3	8	0	10	1	—		37	4
Selangor	2009	Malaysia Super League	24	13	7	4	7	6	—		38	23
Selangor	2010	Malaysia Super League	21	8	5	2	7	1	2	0	35	11
Selangor	2011	Malaysia Super League	25	6	5	3	9	3	—		39	12
Selangor	2012	Malaysia Super League	25	6	2	1	7	5	—		34	12
Selangor	2013	Malaysia Super League	18	8	2	1	6	2	7	4	33	15
Selangor	Total		210	71	52	20	79	30	17	5	358	126
Johor Darul Ta'zim	2014	Malaysia Super League	21	3	5	1	8	3	—		34	7
Johor Darul Ta'zim	2015	Malaysia Super League	16	5	0	0	8	1	7	1	31	8
Johor Darul Ta'zim	2016	Malaysia Super League	17	2	6	2	5	2	10	2	38	8
Johor Darul Ta'zim	Total		54	10	11	3	21	6	17	3	103	22
Melaka United	2017	Malaysia Super League	10	0	2	1	—		—		12	1
Selangor	2017	Malaysia Super League	8	2	—		7	2	—		15	4
Selangor	2018	Malaysia Super League	22	3	6	1	5	1	—		33	5
Selangor	2019	Malaysia Super League	14	3	2	0	5	0	—		21	3
Selangor	Total		44	8	8	1	17	3	—		69	12
Sarawak United	2020	Malaysia Premier League	11	2	0	0	—		—		11	2
Sabah	2021	Malaysia Super League	22	4	—		8	1	—		30	5
Sabah	2022	Malaysia Super League	18	5	3	0	6	0	—		27	5
Sabah	2023	Malaysia Super League	16	0	2	0	2	0	0	0	20	0
Sabah	Total		56	9	5	0	16	1	0	0	77	10
Career total			385	100	78	25	133	40	34	8	630	173

=== International ===
Appearances and goals by national team and year
National team	Year	Apps	Goals
Malaysia	2004	7	3
Malaysia	2005	1	0
Malaysia	2006	2	0
Malaysia	2009	2	0
Malaysia	2010	7	2
Malaysia	2013	7	0
Malaysia	2014	13	4
Malaysia	2015	10	1
Malaysia	2016	13	5
Malaysia	2017	2	0
Total		64	15

Scores and results list Malaysia's goal tally first, score column indicates score after each Mohd Amri goal.

List of international goals scored by Mohd Amri Yahyah
No.	Date	Venue	Opponent	Score	Result	Competition
1	11 November 2004	Al-Sadaqua Walsalam Stadium, Kuwait City, Kuwait	Kuwait	1–1	1–6	2006 FIFA World Cup qualification
2	8 December 2004	Bukit Jalil National Stadium, Kuala Lumpur, Malaysia	Timor-Leste	2–0	5–0	2004 AFF Championship
3	8 December 2004	Bukit Jalil National Stadium, Kuala Lumpur, Malaysia	Timor-Leste	4–0	5–0	2004 AFF Championship
4	7 December 2010	Jalak Harupat Soreang Stadium, Soreang, Indonesia	Laos	1–0	5–1	2010 AFF Championship
5	7 December 2010	Jalak Harupat Soreang Stadium, Soreang, Indonesia	Laos	2–1	5–1	2010 AFF Championship
6	5 May 2014	Tahnoun bin Mohammed Stadium, Al Ain, United Arab Emirates	Yemen	1–0	2–1	2015 AFC Asian Cup qualification
7	8 August 2014	Pamir Stadium, Dushanbe, Tajikistan	Tajikistan	1–2	1–4	Friendly
8	16 November 2014	Mỹ Đình National Stadium, Hanoi, Vietnam	Vietnam	1–0	1–3	Friendly
9	26 November 2014	Jalan Besar Stadium, Kallang, Singapore	Thailand	1–0	2–3	2014 AFF Championship
10	13 October 2015	National Stadium, Dili, East Timor	Timor-Leste	1–0	1–0	2018 FIFA World Cup qualification
11	2 June 2016	Tan Sri Dato' Haji Hassan Yunos Stadium, Johor Bahru, Malaysia	Timor-Leste	3–0	3–0	2019 AFC Asian Cup qualification
12	26 June 2016	Prince Charles Park, Nadi, Fiji	Fiji	1–0	1–1	Friendly
13	14 November 2016	Shah Alam Stadium, Shah Alam, Malaysia	Papua New Guinea	2–1	2–1	Friendly
14		Thuwunna Stadium, Yangon, Myanmar	Cambodia	2–2	3–2	2016 AFF Championship
15		Thuwunna Stadium, Yangon, Myanmar	Cambodia	3–2	3–2	2016 AFF Championship

== Honours ==
Selangor FA

- Malaysia Super League: 2009, 2010
- Malaysia FA Cup: 2001, 2005, 2009
- Malaysia Cup: 2002, 2005
- Piala Sumbangsih: 2002, 2009, 2010
- Malaysia Premier League: 2005

Johor Darul Takzim

- Malaysia Super League: 2014, 2015, 2016
- Malaysia FA Cup: 2016
- Piala Sumbangsih: 2015, 2016
- AFC Cup: 2015

Malaysia U-23

- SEA Games (bronze) Bronze: 2003

Malaysia

- AFF Championship: 2004 third place
- AFF Championship: 2010 winner
- AFF Championship: 2014 runner up

Individual

- AFF Championship Best XI: 2014
- FAM Award - Best Midfielder : 2009
- FAM Award - Best Striker : 2015

Records

- The oldest player to score a hattrick in Malaysia football leagues (aged 41)

Sporting positions
Preceded by Shukor Adan	Selangor FA captain 2009–2012	Succeeded by Asraruddin Putra Omar
Preceded by Mohd Safiq Rahim	Malaysia national football team captain 2016–present	Succeeded by Incumbent
Preceded by Ilija Spasojević	Melaka United captain 2017	Succeeded by G. Puaneswaran
