= 2011 Selangor FA season =

Selangor FA
2011 season
- Chairman: Khalid Ibrahim
- Manager: K. Devan
- Stadium: Shah Alam Stadium
- Malaysia Super League: 3rd
- FA Cup: Semi-finals
- Malaysia Cup: Semi-finals
- Top goalscorer: Mohd Safiq Rahim (7)
Home colours	Away colours

The 2011 Selangor FA Season is Selangor FA's 6th season playing soccer in the Malaysia Super League Since its inception in 2004.

Selangor FA began the season on 10 January 2011. They will also compete in two domestic cups; The FA Cup Malaysia and Malaysia Cup.

== Malaysia Super League ==
Pos	Team	Pld	W	D	L	GF	GA	GD	Pts	Qualification or relegation
1	Kelantan (C)	26	17	5	4	52	21	+31	56	Qualification to AFC Cup group stage (Note: Terengganu qualified for the AFC Cup group stage by winning the 2011 Malaysia FA Cup. They automatically advanced to the group stage due to restructuring of the East Zone playoffs.)
2	Terengganu	26	16	5	5	54	26	+28	53	Qualification to AFC Cup group stage
3	Selangor	26	16	4	6	42	24	+18	52	
4	Kedah	26	13	6	7	25	20	+5	45	
5	Harimau Muda A	26	12	7	7	38	28	+10	43	

Updated to match(es) played on unknown. Source: FIFA
Rules for classification: 1) Points; 2) Goal difference; 3) Number of goals scored.
(C) Champions

== Malaysia FA Cup ==
As defending league champions, Selangor received a bye in the first round.

=== Second round ===
Friday 4 March	Selangor FA	2 - 1	(Malaysia) Harimau Muda B	Stadium Shah Alam
8:45 GMT	Razman 35'; Hadi Zainal 38'		Saarvindran 67'	Referee: 4,500

=== Quarter-finals ===
The first leg matches will be played on 9 March 2010, with the second legs to be held on 20 March 2010.

Team 1	Agg.	Team 2	1st leg	2nd leg
Selangor FA	5–2	Johor FA	3–1	2–1

=== Semi-finals ===
The first leg matches will be played on 30 March 2010, with the second legs to be held on 3 April 2010.

Team 1	Agg.	Team 2	1st leg	2nd leg
Selangor FA	2–6	Kelantan FA	1–5	1–1

== Malaysia Cup ==
=== Group stage ===
==== Group D ====
Team	Pld	W	D	L	GF	GA	GD	Pts
(Terengganu) PBDKT T-Team FC	6	4	1	1	15	4	+11	13
Selangor FA	6	3	1	2	9	5	+4	10
Kuala Lumpur FA	6	2	3	1	7	4	+3	9
(Kuala Lumpur) PDRM FA	6	0	1	5	1	19	−18	1

=== Knockout stage ===
==== Bracket ====
Quarterfinals
D2	Selangor FA	3	1	4
A1	Perak FA	1	0	1
B2	Terengganu FA	3	2	5
C1	Kelantan FA	1	2	3
C2	(Kuala Lumpur) Felda United FC	1	0	1
B1	Negeri Sembilan	0	3	3
A2	Sabah FA	1	1	2
D1	(Terengganu) T-Team FC	2	2	4

Semifinals
D2	Selangor FA	0	1	1
B2	Terengganu FA	2	2	4
B1	Negeri Sembilan	4	2	6
D1	(Terengganu) T-Team FC	2	1	3

Final
B2	Terengganu FA	1
B1	Negeri Sembilan	2
