= Razman Roslan =

Malaysian footballer

Personal information
- Full name: Mohammad Razman bin Roslan
- Date of birth: 14 August 1984 (age 42)
- Place of birth: Kajang, Selangor, Malaysia
- Height: 1.80 m (5 ft 11 in)
- Positions: Centre-back; right-back

Youth career
- 1997–2001: Bukit Jalil Sports School
- 2002–2004: Selangor U-21

Senior career*
Years	Team	Apps	(Gls)
2004–2012	Selangor	125	(5)
2013–2015	Pahang	62	(4)
2016–2018	Selangor	43	(1)
2019–2021	Melaka United	35	(0)

International career^{‡}
2010–2015	Malaysia	10	(0)
Medal record
Men's football
Representing Malaysia
AFF Championship
Winner	2010
- * Club domestic league appearances and goals as of 26 November 2021 ‡ National team caps and goals as of 12 November 2015

Razman Roslan (born 14 August 1984) is a former Malaysian professional footballer and Malaysian football pundit. He mainly plays as a centre-back throughout his career but can also play as a right-back .

== Club career ==
Razman began his career with Selangor U-21 in 2002. He later promoted to the senior team for the Malaysia Cup in 2004. Razman won a domestic treble with Selangor in 2005. He also won a domestic double with Selangor in 2009.

In 2013, Razman signed with Pahang winning the 2013 Malaysia Cup in his first season followed by 2014 Charity Shield, 2014 Malaysia FA Cup and 2014 Malaysia Cup.

He returned to Selangor in 2016 and selected as the team captain. In 2019 he signed with Melaka United.

== International career ==
In November 2010, Razman was called up to the Malaysia national team by head coach K. Rajagopal for the 2010 AFF Suzuki Cup. On 1 December 2010, he made his debut for Malaysia in a 5–1 defeat to Indonesia. Razman made two appearances during that tournament and helped his team clinch the 2010 AFF Suzuki Cup title.

== Career statistics ==
=== Club ===
As of 26 November 2021.

Appearances and goals by club, season and competition
Club	Season	League			Cup		League Cup		Continental^{1}		Total	
Club	Season	Division	Apps	Goals	Apps	Goals	Apps	Goals	Apps	Goals	Apps	Goals
Selangor	2004	Malaysia Premier League	–		–		2	1	–		2	1
Selangor	2005	Malaysia Premier League	8	0	3	0	0	0	–		11	0
Selangor	2005–06	Malaysia Super League	6	0	1	0	0	0	5	1	12	1
Selangor	2006–07	Malaysia Super League	11	2	1	0	3	1	–		15	3
Selangor	2007–08	Malaysia Super League	16	1	6	0	4	0	–		26	1
Selangor	2009	Malaysia Super League	24	1	7	0	7	0	–		38	1
Selangor	2010	Malaysia Super League	22	1	6	0	7	0	6	0	41	1
Selangor	2011	Malaysia Super League	14	0	3	0	10	0	–		27	0
Selangor	2012	Malaysia Super League	24	0	2	0	9	0	–		35	0
Selangor	Total		125	5	29	0	42	2	11	1	207	8
Pahang	2013	Malaysia Super League	21	3	6	0	11	0	–		38	3
Pahang	2014	Malaysia Super League	19	1	5	0	11	0	–		35	1
Pahang	2015	Malaysia Super League	22	0	6	0	2	0	5	0	35	0
Pahang	Total		62	4	17	0	24	0	5	0	108	4
Selangor	2016	Malaysia Super League	16	1	2	0	8	0	2	0	28	1
Selangor	2017	Malaysia Super League	19	0	1	0	6	0	–		26	0
Selangor	2018	Malaysia Super League	8	0	6	0	4	0	–		18	0
Selangor	Total		43	1	9	0	18	0	2	0	72	1
Melaka United	2019	Malaysia Super League	14	0	1	0	6	0	–		21	0
Melaka United	2020	Malaysia Super League	6	0	0	0	0	0	–		6	0
Melaka United	2021	Malaysia Super League	15	0	–		7	0	–		22	0
Melaka United	Total		35	0	1	0	13	0	–		49	0
Career Total			265	10	56	0	97	2	18	1	436	13

^{1} Includes AFC Cup and AFC Champions League.

=== International ===
As of 12 November 2015

Appearances and goals by national team and year
National team	Year	Apps	Goals
Malaysia	2010	2	0
Malaysia	2013	3	0
Malaysia	2014	1	0
Malaysia	2015	4	0
Total		10	0

== Honours ==
=== Club ===
Selangor FA

- Malaysian Charity Shield: 2009, 2010
- Malaysian Super League: 2009, 2010
- Malaysian Premier League: 2005
- Malaysia Cup: 2005
- Malaysian FA Cup: 2005, 2009

Pahang FA

- Malaysia Cup: 2013, 2014
- Malaysian FA Cup: 2014
- Malaysian Charity Shield: 2014

=== International ===
==== Malaysia ====
- AFF Championship: 2010

=== Individual ===
- Malaysia Super League 'Best Defender Award': 2014
