= Yosri Derma Raju =

Malaysian footballer

Personal information
- Full name: Yosri a/l Derma Raju
- Date of birth: 15 July 1982 (age 44)
- Place of birth: Negeri Sembilan, Malaysia
- Height: 1.78 m (5 ft 10 in)
- Position: Defender

Youth career
- 2000–2003: Negeri Sembilan

Senior career*
Years	Team	Apps	(Gls)
2003–2006	Negeri Sembilan	33	(4)
2006–2007	UPB-MyTeam	21	(1)
2007–2008	PDRM	24	(1)
2009	Johor	23	(2)
2010	Pahang	19	(1)
2011	Selangor	15	(0)
2012	Sarawak	28	(0)
2013–2015	Sime Darby	26	(0)
2016–2017	MISC-MIFA		
2018–2022	KSR Sains		

International career
2003–2004	Malaysia U-23	1	(0)
2003–2005	Malaysia	3	(0)
- * Club domestic league appearances and goals as of 24 March 2020

Yosri a/l Derma Raju (born 15 July 1982 in Negeri Sembilan) is a former Malaysian footballer. He is of Orang Asli heritage.

Yosri has played for Sarawak FA in 2012 Malaysia Super League season. From 2013 to 2015 he played for Sime Darby F.C., and from 2016 to 2017 he played for MISC-MIFA. He also played for Negeri Sembilan FA, Selangor FA, Pahang FA, PDRM FA, Johor FA and UPB-MyTeam FC. His younger brother, Azari Dermaraju, was also a footballer, and had played with Betaria FC in the 2012 Malaysia Premier League.

Yosri has played for the Malaysia under 23 team and also the senior team. Yosri once caused a sensation in 2003 when he became the first Orang Asli to receive a national squad call-up at the age of 21 when he played as Negeri Sembilan's senior defender.
