= Fitri Shazwan Raduwan =

Malaysian footballer (born 1987)

Mohd Fitri Shazwan Raduwan
Personal information
- Full name: Mohd Fitri Shazwan bin Raduwan
- Date of birth: 8 December 1987 (age 38)
- Place of birth: Petaling Jaya, Selangor, Malaysia
- Height: 1.55 m (5 ft 1 in)
- Positions: Midfielder; winger

Team information
- Current team: Penang FA
- Number: 24

Youth career
- 2005–2006: Selangor President Cup Team

Senior career*
Years	Team	Apps	(Gls)
2006–2017	Selangor FA	150	(12)
2018	Penang FA	12	(1)
- * Club domestic league appearances and goals as of 22 July 2018

Mohd Fitri Shazwan bin Raduwan (born 8 December 1987) is a Malaysian footballer who last played for Penang FA in Malaysia Premier League.

== Honours ==
=== Club ===
Selangor FA

- Malaysia Super League (2) : 2009, 2010
- Malaysia FA Cup (1) : 2009
- Malaysia Charity Shield (2) : 2009, 2010
- Malaysia Cup (1): 2015
