= Solehin Kanasian Abdullah =

Malaysian footballer

Solihin bin Kanasian
Personal information
- Full name: Solihin bin Kanasian
- Date of birth: 30 June 1983 (age 43)
- Place of birth: Kedah, Malaysia
- Height: 1.68 m (5 ft 6 in)
- Position: Midfielder

Team information
- Current team: PBMS F.C.
- Number: 12

Youth career
- 2001–2003: Kedah President's Cup Team

Senior career*
Years	Team	Apps	(Gls)
2002–2007	Kedah FA		
2007–2010	Perlis FA		
2010–2011	Kelantan FA		
2012–2013	Selangor FA		
2014	Felda United F.C.	7	(0)
2015	Kedah FA	6	(0)
2016	MOF F.C.		
2017–	PBMS F.C.		

International career^{‡}
2008–	Malaysia	1	(0)
- * Club domestic league appearances and goals as of 10 November 2015 ‡ National team caps and goals as of 10 November 2015

Solihin bin Kanasian (born 30 Jun 1983) also known as K.Soley is a Malaysian footballer who plays as a right midfielder for PBMS F.C. Previously, he had played for Kelantan FA for a season and also be the parts of the team be the champion of Malaysia Super League on season 2011 for the first time.

== Career ==
On 30 June 2007, he helped Kedah FA to win the Malaysian FA Cup after beating Perlis FA 4–2 on penalties( both teams tied at 0–0 after extra time ) in Batu Kawan Stadium. In November 2010, he joined Kelantan FA for 2011 season but he can't get himself to be in the first team squad. Kelantan FA, later released him and in December 2011, he signed a contract with Selangor FA for 2012 Malaysia Super League season.

== International career ==
Soley made his international debut in a friendly against Indonesia on 6 June 2008, after substituting for Muhammad Shukor Adan, in which the game finished 1–1. This is currently his only appearance for the national team
