= 2010 Selangor FA season =

Selangor FA
2010 season
- Chairman: Khalid Ibrahim
- Manager: K. Devan
- Stadium: Shah Alam Stadium
- 2010 Malaysia Super League: 1st
- 2010 Malaysia FA Cup: Semi-finals
- 2010 Malaysia Cup: Quarter-finals
- Top goalscorer: Safee Sali (12); Amirul Hadi Zainal (12)

Since its inception in 2004, the 2010 Selangor FA Season is Selangor FA's 5th season playing soccer in the Malaysia Super League.

Selangor FA began their season on January 10, 2010. They will also compete in two domestic cups; The FA Cup Malaysia and Malaysia Cup.

== Malaysia Super League ==
Pos	Team	Pld	W	D	L	GF	GA	GD	Pts
1	Selangor	26	20	3	3	62	23	+39	63
2	Kelantan	26	17	8	1	50	14	+36	59
3	Terengganu	26	15	5	6	51	27	+24	50
4	Johor FC	26	13	4	9	44	29	+15	43
5	Kedah	26	10	8	8	34	23	+11	38

Source: Results TM Liga Super
Rules for classification: 1) points; 2) goal difference; 3) number of goals scored.

=== Top goalscorers ===
Including matches played on n/a; Source: FIFA: Malaysia Super League Scorers

Rank	Scorer	Club	Goals
2	Mohd Safee Mohd Sali	Selangor FA	12
3	Mohd Amirul Hadi Zainal	Selangor FA	12
8	R. Surendran	Selangor FA	8

== Malaysia FA Cup ==
=== First round ===
Selangor had a first round bye.

=== Second round ===
The first leg matches will be played on 16 February 2010, with the second legs to be held on 20 February 2010.

Team 1	Agg.	Team 2	1st leg	2nd leg
Selangor FA	2–1	(Selangor) PKNS FC	2–0	0–1

=== Quarter-finals ===
The first leg matches will be played on 9 March 2010, with the second legs to be held on 20 March 2010.

Team 1	Agg.	Team 2	1st leg	2nd leg
Selangor FA	8–1	(Federal Territories of Malaysia) Pos Malaysia FC	5–1	3–0

=== Semi-finals ===
The first leg matches will be played on 30 March 2010, with the second legs to be held on 3 April 2010.

Team 1	Agg.	Team 2	1st leg	2nd leg
Selangor FA	2–2 (a)	Negeri Sembilan FA	1–2	1–0

== Malaysia Cup ==
=== Group stage ===
==== Group D ====
Pos	Team	Pld	W	D	L	GF	GA	GD	Pts
1	Selangor FA (A)	6	6	0	0	16	4	+12	18
2	Perlis FA (A)	6	3	0	3	12	10	+2	9
3	(Terengganu) PBDKT T-Team FC	6	2	1	3	10	11	−1	7
4	(Kuala Lumpur) Felda United FC	6	0	1	5	6	19	−13	1

(A) Advanced to knockout stage

=== Knockout stage ===
==== Bracket ====
Quarterfinals
A1	Negeri Sembilan	1	3	4
D2	Perlis	0	1	1
B1	Johor FC	1	1	2*
C2	(Terengganu) Pahang	0	2	2
C1	(Pahang) Terengganu	2	0	2
B2	Kedah	2	3	5
D1	Selangor	0	0	0
A2	Kelantan	0	3	3

Semifinals
A1	Negeri Sembilan	0	2	2
C1	Johor FC	1	0	1
C2	Kedah	0	0	0
A2	Kelantan	0	1	1

Final
A1	Negeri Sembilan	1
A2	Kelantan	2

- Aggregate 2–2. Johor FC won on away-goal rules.
