= Asraruddin Putra =

Malaysian footballer

Personal information
- Full name: Mohd Asraruddin Putra bin Omar
- Date of birth: 26 August 1988 (age 38)
- Place of birth: Kuala Selangor, Selangor, Malaysia
- Height: 1.83 m (6 ft 0 in)
- Position: Defender

Team information
- Current team: Kelana United

Youth career
- 2001–2005: Bukit Jalil Sports School
- 2006–2007: Selangor

Senior career*
Years	Team	Apps	(Gls)
2007–2013	Selangor	115	(10)
2014–2017	Johor Darul Ta'zim	36	(5)
2021–2023	Kelana United	0	(0)

International career^{‡}
2005–2008	Malaysia U19	20	(1)
2005–2009	Malaysia U20	18	(4)
2008–2011	Malaysia U23	13	(1)
2008–2013	Malaysia	36	(0)

Managerial career
- 2022: Malaysia U19 (assistant coach)
Medal record
Representing Malaysia
Winner	AFF Suzuki	2010
Malaysia U23
First place	2011 SEA Games	2011 Jakarta
First place	2009 SEA Games	2009 Vientiane
Malaysia U20
Runner-up	AFF U-20 Youth Championship	2007
Malaysia U18
First place	Lion City Cup	2005
- * Club domestic league appearances and goals as of January 6, 2022 ‡ National team caps and goals as of 16 November 2014

Mohd Asraruddin Putra bin Omar (born 26 August 1988) is a former Malaysian professional footballer. He has represented the Malaysia national football team, as well as the Malaysia U-23 and Malaysia U-20 squads. Asraruddin was captain of Selangor FC during the 2013 season. He is currently the captain of Kelana United, a team that participated in the Subang Football League in the 2021 season.

== Career ==
Asraruddin, a left-back for the Malaysia U-19 during the 2007 Champions Youth Cup, served as the team's vice-captain and assumed the captaincy from the injured Mohd Bunyamin Umar in the match against PSV Eindhoven.

In November 2007, Asraruddin underwent a one-week trial with Dutch club PSV Eindhoven. The club had been impressed by his performance, along with that of his teammate, during the Champions Youth Cup hosted by Malaysia in August 2007. Capable of playing as either a left-back or a center-back, Asraruddin, a former student of the Bukit Jalil Sports School, was instrumental in helping Malaysia qualify for the AFC Under-20 Championship for the first time in over 20 years.

Asraruddin made his under-23 debut against the Republic of Ireland on 15 May 2008 and earned his senior international debut against the India on 22 July 2008 as a substitute. Additionally, he represented the Malaysia Selection squad in a match against Chelsea at the Shah Alam Stadium on 29 July 2008, a game in which Malaysia XI lost 0–2.

== Outside Football ==
Asraruddin owns a barbershop called Piratas Barber Shop, located in Puncak Alam. He has stated that he is not considering retirement at this time; instead, he is focusing on recovering from a knee injury while making ends meet through his barbershop business.

In May 2023, Asraruddin migrated to Jeddah, Saudi Arabia, after marrying a nurse employed at a local hospital in the city. He stated that his intention for relocating was to fulfil his aspiration of residing near and learning about religion in Mecca. However, he has not announced his retirement from professional football.

== Honours ==
=== Club ===
Selangor

- Malaysian Charity Shield (2) : 2009, 2010
- Malaysia Super League (2) : 2009, 2010
- Malaysia FA Cup : 2009

Johor Darul Ta'zim

- Malaysian Charity Shield : 2015
- Malaysia Super League (3) : 2014, 2015, 2016
- Malaysia Cup : 2014
- AFC Cup : 2015

=== International ===
Malaysia

- AFF Championship : 2010

Malaysia U23

- SEA Games (2) : 2009, 2011

Malaysia U20

- AFF U-20 Youth Championship : 2007 runner-up

Malaysia U18

- Lion City Cup : 2005

Sporting positions
Preceded by Mohd Amri Yahyah	Selangor FA captain 2013	Succeeded by Mohd Bunyamin Umar
