= 2019 PKNS F.C. season =

6th season in the Malaysia Super League

PKNS
2019 season
- President: Siti Zubaidah Abdul Jabar
- Manager: Mahfizul Rusydin Abdul Rashid
- Head Coach: K. Rajagobal
- Stadium: Shah Alam Stadium (Capacity: 80,372)
- Super League: 9th
- FA Cup: Quarter-finals
- Malaysia Cup: Group Stage
- Top goalscorer: League: Kpah Sherman (14 goals); All: Kpah Sherman (18 goals)
Home colours	Away colours

The 2019 season is PKNS's 6th season in the top flight of Malaysian football, the Malaysia Super League after being promoted from 2016 Malaysia Premier League.

== Club officials ==
Position	Staff
Head Coach	(Malaysia) K. Rajagobal
Assistant Head Coach	(Malaysia) Adam Abdullah
Goalkeeping Coach	(Malaysia) Faozi Mukhlas
Fitness Coach	(Slovakia) Matus Bozik
Assistant Coach	(Malaysia) Khairil Abu Zahar
Team Doctor	(Malaysia) M.Viijayan

== Players ==
No.	Pos.	Player	Nationality	Date of birth (age)	Signed from	Since	Ends
1	GK	Zarif Irfan	(Malaysia)	21 February 1995 (age 31)	Selangor	2018	
3	DF	Rodney Celvin	(Malaysia)	25 November 1996 (age 29)	Sarawak	2018	
4	DF	Tamirlan Kozubaev	(Kyrgyzstan)	1 July 1994 (age 32)	Dordoi Bishkek	2019	
5	DF	Nik Shahrul Azim	(Malaysia)	30 December 1990 (age 35)	Kelantan	2018	
6	DF	Nicholas Swirad	(Malaysia)	28 May 1991 (age 35)	Melaka United	2019	
7	MF	K. Gurusamy	(Malaysia)	11 November 1989 (age 36)	Sarawak	2017	
8	MF	Tommy Mawat	(Malaysia)	26 June 1996 (age 30)	Petaling Jaya Rangers	2019	
9	FW	Kpah Sherman	(Liberia)	3 February 1992 (age 34)	MISC-MIFA	2019	
10	MF	Romel Morales	(Colombia)	23 August 1997 (age 29)	Banfield	2017	
11	FW	Jafri Firdaus Chew	(Malaysia)	11 June 1997 (age 29)	Penang	2018	
12	DF	Qayyum Marjoni	(Malaysia)	28 March 1994 (age 32)	Kelantan	2018	
13	FW	R. Surendran	(Malaysia)	26 October 1982 (age 44)	Unattached	2019	
14	MF	Akram Mahinan	(Malaysia)	19 January 1993 (age 33)	Kedah	2019	
15	DF	Padathan Gunalan	(Malaysia)	9 November 1981 (age 45)	Selangor	2013	
16	FW	Faizat Ghazli	(Malaysia)	28 November 1994 (age 31)	Penang	2017	
17	DF	Kannan Kalaiselvan	(Malaysia)	4 October 1996 (age 30)	Selangor	2019	2019
18	DF	Mahali Jasuli	(Malaysia)	2 April 1989 (age 37)	Johor Darul Ta'zim	2018	
20	FW	Gabriel Guerra	(Argentina)	17 April 1993 (age 33)	Huracán	2019	
21	GK	Farhan Abu Bakar	(Malaysia)	14 December 1993 (age 32)	Kedah	2019	
22	GK	Tauffiq Ar Rasyid	(Malaysia)	14 December 1995 (age 30)	Youth team	2018	
23	MF	Alif Haikal	(Malaysia)	19 October 1995 (age 31)	Harimau Muda C	2015	
25	DF	Shahrom Kalam	(Malaysia)	15 September 1985 (age 41)	Felcra	2019	
26	FW	Shafiq Shaharudin	(Malaysia)	26 March 1994 (age 32)	Kelantan	2019	
27	MF	Ariff Farhan	(Malaysia)	14 July 1996 (age 30)	Kedah	2019	
29	FW	Kittiphong Pluemjai	(Thailand)	29 March 1993 (age 33)	Lysekloster IL	2019	
30	DF	Shivan Pillay ^{PS}	(Malaysia)	7 December 2000 (age 25)	Youth team	2019	
–	MF	Ariff Ar-Rasyid Ariffin ^{PS}	(Malaysia)	28 December 1998 (age 27)	Youth team	2019	

- ^{PS} = President squad player

== Transfers and contracts ==
=== In ===
1st leg

Pos.	Player	From	Fee	Ref
GK	(Malaysia) Farhan Abu Bakar	(Malaysia) Kedah	Season loan	
DF	(Malaysia) (England) Nicholas Swirad	(Malaysia) Melaka United	Free	
DF	(Malaysia) Mahali Jasuli	(Malaysia) Johor Darul Ta'zim	Season loan	
DF	(Malaysia) Fandi Othman	(Malaysia) Felcra	Free	
DF	(Malaysia) Shahrom Kalam	(Malaysia) Felcra	Free	
DF	(Kyrgyzstan) Tamirlan Kozubaev	(Kyrgyzstan) Dordoi Bishkek	Free	
MF	(Malaysia) Akram Mahinan	(Malaysia) Kedah	Free	
MF	(Malaysia) Ariff Farhan Isa	(Malaysia) Kedah	Free	
MF	(Malaysia) Tommy Mawat Bada	(Malaysia) Petaling Jaya Rangers	Free	
FW	(Malaysia) Shafiq Shaharudin	(Malaysia) Kelantan	Free	
FW	(Liberia) Kpah Sherman	(Malaysia) MISC-MIFA	Free	
FW	(Malaysia) R. Surendran	Free agent	Free	
FW	(Cambodia) Chan Vathanaka	(Cambodia) Boeung Ket Angkor	Free	
FW	(Argentina) Gabriel Guerra	(Argentina) Huracán	Free	

2nd leg

Pos.	Player	From	Fee	Ref
FW	(Thailand) Kittiphong Pluemjai	(Norway) Lysekloster IL	Free	

=== Out ===
1st leg

Pos.	Player	To	Fee	Ref
GK	(Malaysia) Shahril Saa'ri	(Malaysia) Perlis	Free	
DF	(Malaysia) K. Reuben	(Malaysia) UKM	Free	
DF	(Malaysia) (England) Daniel Ting	Retired		
DF	(Australia) Zac Anderson	(Malaysia) Perak	Free	
DF	(Malaysia) Azmizi Azmi	(Malaysia) Perlis	Free	
DF	(Malaysia) Annas Rahmat	Released		
DF	(Malaysia) Mahali Jasuli	(Malaysia) Johor Darul Ta'zim	End of loan	
MF	(Malaysia) Shahrul Azhar Ture	Released		
MF	(Malaysia) Nazrin Bahri	(Malaysia) Perlis	Free	
MF	(Malaysia) Khyril Muhymeen	(Malaysia) Perlis	Free	
MF	(Malaysia) Nurridzuan Abu Hassan	(Malaysia) Selangor	Free	
MF	(Malaysia) M. Sivakumar	(Malaysia) Petaling Jaya City	Free	
MF	(Singapore) Faris Ramli	(Malaysia) Perlis	Free	
MF	(Brazil) Bruno Oliveira de Matos	(Indonesia) Persija Jakarta	Free	
FW	(Malaysia) Safee Sali	(Malaysia) Perlis	Free	
FW	(Brazil) Rafael Ramazotti	(Singapore) Hougang United	Free	

2nd leg

Pos.	Player	To	Fee	Ref
FW	(Cambodia) Chan Vathanaka	(Cambodia) Boeung Ket Angkor	Free	

=== Loans out ===
1st leg

Pos.	Player	To	Date from	Date to	Ref
DF	(Malaysia) Fandi Othman	(Malaysia) Selangor	20 February 2019	End of season	

2nd leg

Pos.	Player	To	Date from	Date to	Ref
FW	(Malaysia) Shafiq Shaharudin	(Malaysia) Kuala Lumpur	1 June 2019	End of season	

=== Loans in ===
Pos.	Player	From	Date from	Date to	Ref
DF	(Malaysia) Kannan Kalaiselvan	(Malaysia) Selangor	20 February 2019	End of season	

== Friendlies ==
15 December 2018 1	PKNS (Malaysia)	1–0	(Malaysia) PKNS U21	Kompleks Sukan PKNS

22 December 2018 2	PKNS (Malaysia)	1–0	(Malaysia) PDRM	Kompleks Sukan PKNS
	Jafri Firdaus Chew

29 December 2018 3	PKNS (Malaysia)	cancelled	(Malaysia) MISC-MIFA	Kompleks Sukan PKNS
8:00

5 January 2019 4	PKNS (Malaysia)	1–0	(Malaysia) Perlis	Kompleks Sukan PKNS
	Kpah Sherman

11 January 2019 5	PKNS (Malaysia)	3–0	(Malaysia) Johor Darul Ta'zim II	Pasir Gudang Corporation Stadium
	Shafiq 56'; Shahrom 60'; Sherman 65'

26 January 2019 6	PKNS (Malaysia)	2–1	(Malaysia) PKNP	Kompleks Sukan PKNS

Tour of Singapore (12 to 16 Jan 2019)

13 January 2019 1	PKNS (Malaysia)	2–0	(Singapore) Geylang International	Jalan Besar Stadium
	Gurusamy 76'; Faizat 80'

16 January 2019 2	PKNS (Malaysia)	3–0	(Singapore) Garena Young Lions	Jalan Besar Stadium
	Morales 34'; Gurusamy 46', 87'

== Competitions ==
=== Malaysia Super League ===
==== Tables ====
Pos	Team	Pld	W	D	L	GF	GA	GD	Pts	Qualification or relegation
7	Terengganu	22	7	9	6	35	37	−2	30	
8	Petaling Jaya City	22	8	2	12	22	29	−7	26	
9	PKNS (Note: PKNS F.C. relegated after withdrawing license to complete for the 2020 Malaysia Premier League season as they become feeder club to Selangor FA.) (R)	22	5	6	11	37	38	−1	21	Relegation to Malaysia Premier League
10	Felda United	22	4	7	11	27	43	−16	19	
11	PKNP (R)	22	3	7	12	22	40	−18	16	Relegation to Malaysia Premier League

Source: MFL
Rules for classification: 1) Points; 2) Goal difference; 3) Number of goals scored.
(R) Relegated

==== Matches ====
1 February 2019 1	Terengganu	1–1	PKNS	Kuala Terengganu
21:00 UTC+8	Zonjić (yellow card) 73'; Malik 89'	Report	Qayyum (yellow card) 23'; Swirad 65'; Faizat (yellow card) 71'; Morales (yellow card) 89'	Stadium: Sultan Ismail Nasiruddin Shah Stadium; Referee: Mat Zan Abdul Wahab

9 February 2019 2	PKNS	0–1	Melaka United	Shah Alam
21:00 UTC+8	Rodney (yellow card) 43'; Qayyum (yellow card) 67'; Sherman (yellow card) 82'	Report	Jang (yellow card) 16'; Safiq 25' (pen.)	Stadium: Shah Alam Stadium; Referee: Nazmi Nasaruddin

17 February 2019 3	Selangor	0–4	PKNS	Shah Alam
21:00 UTC+8	Nguyễn (yellow card) 23'	Report	Swirad 29'; Sherman 50'; Vathanaka 80'; Morales 90+2'	Stadium: Shah Alam Stadium; Referee: Khairulazuan Kidam

23 February 2019 4	PKNS	1–0	PKNP	Shah Alam
21:00 UTC+8	Sherman 2', (red card); Gurusamy (yellow card) 6'; Kozubaev (yellow card) 45+1'	Report	Sukri (yellow card) 30'; Aguinaldo (yellow card) 78'; Hafiz (yellow card) 80'	Stadium: Shah Alam Stadium; Referee: Zamzaidi Katimin

2 March 2019 5	Kedah	0–0	PKNS	Alor Setar
21:00 UTC+8	Rizal (yellow card) 29'; Alves (red card) 87'; Baddrol (yellow card) 90+1'	Report	Faizat (yellow card) 17'; Swirad (yellow card) 35'; Vathanaka (yellow card) 44'; Rodney (yellow card) 56'; Guerra (yellow card) 72'; Kozubaev (yellow card) 76'	Stadium: Darul Aman Stadium; Referee: Mohd Amirul Izwan Yaacob

9 March 2019 6	PKNS	2–0	Felda United	Shah Alam
21:00 UTC+8	Morales 24'; Kozubaev 47'	Report	Watanabe (yellow card) 45+3'; Raffi (yellow card) 65'	Stadium: Shah Alam Stadium; Referee: Mohd Nafeez Abdul Wahab

30 March 2019 7	Petaling Jaya City	1–0	PKNS	Petaling Jaya
21:00 UTC+8	Aizulridzwan 59'	Report	Qayyum (yellow card) 85'	Stadium: Petaling Jaya Stadium; Referee: Fitri Maskon

7 April 2019 8	Perak	2–2	PKNS	Ipoh
22:00 UTC+8	Shahrel 39'; Gilmar 52'	Report	Guerra 23'; Swirad (yellow card) 42'; Morales 56', (yellow card) 86'	Stadium: Perak Stadium; Referee: Suhaizi Shukri

14 April 2019 9	PKNS	1–2	Pahang	Shah Alam
22:00 UTC+8	Vathanaka 13'; Gurusamy (yellow card) 32'; Kozubaev (yellow card) 52'; Shahrom (yellow card) 89'	Report	Nwakaeme 25'; Zé Eduardo 76'	Stadium: Shah Alam Stadium; Referee: Mohd Zohri Tajuddin

20 April 2019 10	Johor Darul Ta'zim	3–1	PKNS	Johor Bahru
22:00 UTC+8	Afiq 8', (yellow card) 90'; Cabrera 14' (pen.); Syamer (yellow card) 28'; Safawi 85'	Report	Rodney (yellow card) 33'; Guerra (yellow card) 45' (goal) 48'; Nik Shahrul (yellow card) 53'	Stadium: Tan Sri Dato' Haji Hassan Yunos Stadium; Referee: Nazmi Nasaruddin

27 April 2019 11	PKNS	3–2	Kuala Lumpur	Shah Alam
22:00 UTC+8	Morales 1'; Sherman 31', 78'; Mahali (yellow card) 54'; Gurusamy (yellow card) 90+2'	Report	Firdaus (yellow card) 27'; Indra Putra 42'; Guilherme 82'	Stadium: Shah Alam Stadium; Referee: Fitri Maskon

3 May 2019 12	PKNS	3–3	Perak	Shah Alam
21:00 UTC+8	Sherman 5', (yellow card) 34'; Tommy (yellow card) 11'; Swirad 43'; Faizat (yellow card) 49'; Kozubaev (yellow card) 72'; Kannan (yellow card) 80'	Report	Gan 12'; Partiban 50'; Nasir (yellow card) 57'; Nazirul 81'	Stadium: Shah Alam Stadium; Referee: Khirulazuan Kidam

14 May 2019 13	Kuala Lumpur	2–1	PKNS	Bandar Tun Razak
22:00 UTC+8	Indra Putra 28'; Azmi 57'; Guilherme (yellow card) 66'; Ashri (yellow card) 73'	Report	Morales 5'; Tommy (yellow card) 90+6'	Stadium: Kuala Lumpur Stadium; Referee: Suhaizi Shukri

17 May 2019 14	PKNS	1–2	Johor Darul Ta'zim	Shah Alam
22:00 UTC+8	Gurusamy (yellow card) 27'; Morales 30'; Akram (yellow card) 45'; Kozubaev (yellow card) 62'; Kannan (yellow card) 88'	Report	Safawi 18'; Velázquez (yellow card) 34'; Diogo 61'; Cabrera (yellow card) 73'	Stadium: Shah Alam Stadium; Referee: Mohd Fairuzi Mat Desa

25 May 2019 15	PKNS	3–0	Petaling Jaya City	Shah Alam
22:00 UTC+8	Akram (yellow card) 17'; Rodney (yellow card) 47'; Guerra 50'; Sherman 53', 73'	Report	Serginho (yellow card) 44'	Stadium: Shah Alam Stadium; Referee: Fitri Maskon

14 June 2019 16	Felda United	5–4	PKNS	Jengka
21:00 UTC+8	Thiago Junio 4'; Hadin 45'; Jasazrin (yellow card) 45+4'; Faiz 48'; Khairul Amri 52', 56'; Norazlan (yellow card) 88'	Report	Kannan (yellow card) 10'; Sherman 15'; Kozubaev 60'; Jafri 72'; Rodney 82'	Stadium: Tun Abdul Razak Stadium; Referee: Hamdan Awang

18 June 2019 17	PKNS	2–3	Felda United	Shah Alam
21:00 UTC+8	Akram (yellow card) 5'; Sherman 53' (pen.), 66'	Report	Baddrol 10'; Fayadh 71'; Rizal 90+2'	Stadium: Shah Alam Stadium; Referee: Zamzaidi Katimin

25 June 2019 18	PKNP	2–2	PKNS	Manjung
21:00 UTC+8	Syazwan (yellow card) 40'; Hafiz 49'; Mugenthirran (yellow card) 63'; Giancarlo 76'	Report	Surendran 35', (yellow card) 57'; Rodney (yellow card) 65'; Nik Shahrul (yellow card) 79'; Sherman 84' (pen.)	Stadium: Manjung Municipal Council Stadium; Referee: Zulkarnain Zakaria

5 July 2019 19	PKNS	1–2	Terengganu	Shah Alam
21:00 UTC+8	Farhan (yellow card) 41'; Nik Shahrul (yellow card) 45+2'; Kittiphong 85'	Report	Shaakhmedov 35'; Nasrullah 89'	Stadium: Shah Alam Stadium; Referee: Mohd Amirul Izwan Yaacob

9 July 2019 20	Pahang	3–2	PKNS	Kuantan
21:00 UTC+8	Goulon 31'; Muslim 43'; Safuwan (yellow card) 73'; Davies 89'	Report	Sherman 61'; Guerra 67'; Kozubaev (yellow card) 75'; Qayyum (yellow card) 83'; Mahali (yellow card) 90+3'	Stadium: Darul Makmur Stadium; Referee: Suhaimi Mat Hassan

12 July 2019 21	Melaka United	1–1	PKNS	Krubong
21:00 UTC+8	Shukor 54'	Report	Swirad (yellow card) 53'; Mahali (yellow card) 78'; Sherman 80'; Gurusamy (yellow card) 90+2'	Stadium: Hang Jebat Stadium; Referee: Mohd Nafeez Abdul Wahab

20 July 2019 22	PKNS	2–3	Selangor	Shah Alam
21:00 UTC+8	Morales 3'; Jafri (yellow card) 63'; Akram (yellow card) 81'	Report	Sandro 40'; Olusegun 44', 52'	Stadium: Shah Alam Stadium; Referee: Mohd Fairuzi Mat Desa

=== Malaysia FA Cup ===
3 April 2019 Second round	PKNS	3–2	Melaka United	Shah Alam
21:00 UTC+8	Gurusamy 43'; Ariff (yellow card) 63'; Vathanaka 67'; Sherman 70'	Report	Saiful (yellow card) 47'; Casagrande 86' (pen.); Shukor 90+3'	Stadium: Shah Alam Stadium; Referee: Zulkfifli Ahmad

17 April 2019 Third round	Johor Darul Ta'zim	0–1	PKNS	Larkin
21:00 UTC+8	Insa (red card) 12'	Report	Sherman 14'; Morales (yellow card) 77'	Stadium: Tan Sri Dato' Haji Hassan Yunos Stadium; Referee: Khirulazuan Kidam

30 April 2019 Quarter-finals first leg	PKNS	1–3	Kedah	Shah Alam
21:00 UTC+8	Kozubaev (red card) 32'; Morales (yellow card) 58'; Guerra 64'; Rodney (yellow card) 88'	Report	Fernando 13'; Bauman 26' (pen.), 45+1'; Alif (yellow card) 58'; Zaquan (yellow card) 81'; Renan (yellow card) 84'	Stadium: Shah Alam Stadium; Referee: Zamzaidi Katimin

10 May 2019 Quarter-finals second leg	Kedah	1–1 (4–2 agg.)	PKNS	Alor Setar
21:00 UTC+8	Farhan (yellow card) 10': Bauman 17'; Baddrol (yellow card) 53'; Rizal (yellow card) 70'	Report	Azmeer 32' (o.g.); Rodney (yellow card) 77'	Stadium: Darul Aman Stadium; Referee: Mohd Fairuzi Mat Desa

=== Malaysia Cup ===
==== Group stage ====
Pos	Team	Pld	W	D	L	GF	GA	GD	Pts	Qualification	KED	TER	NSE	PKNS
1	Kedah	6	4	1	1	14	10	+4	13	Advance to knockout stage	—	0–2	4–2	3–2
2	Terengganu	6	4	0	2	14	8	+6	12	Advance to knockout stage	2–3	—	3–1	3–1
3	Negeri Sembilan	6	2	0	4	11	15	−4	6		1–3	3–2	—	1–2
4	PKNS	6	1	1	4	7	13	−6	4		1–1	0–2	1–3	—

Source: FAM MFL

2 August 2019 1	Terengganu	3–1	PKNS	Kuala Terengganu
21:00 UTC+8	Shaakhmedov 6', 90+4'; Nasrullah 38'; Khairu Azrin (yellow card) 40'	Report	Jafri 30'; Nik Shahrul (yellow card) 58'	Stadium: Sultan Ismail Nasiruddin Shah Stadium; Referee: Mohd Fairuzi Mat Desa

7 August 2019 2	Negeri Sembilan	1–2	PKNS	Paroi
21:00 UTC+8		Report	Guerra 15', 30'	Stadium: Tuanku Abdul Rahman Stadium; Referee: Suhaizi Shukri

16 August 2019 3	PKNS	1–1	Kedah	Shah Alam
21:00 UTC+8	Morales 70'			Stadium: Shah Alam Stadium

20 August 2019 4	Kedah	3–2	PKNS	Alor Setar
21:00 UTC+8			Morales 30'; Swirad 70'	Stadium: Darul Aman Stadium

13 September 2019 5	PKNS	1–3	Negeri Sembilan	Shah Alam
21:00 UTC+8	Sherman 45+6'			Stadium: Shah Alam Stadium

17 September 2019 6	PKNS	0–2	Terengganu	Shah Alam
21:00 UTC+8				Stadium: Shah Alam Stadium

== Statistics ==
=== Appearances and goals ===
Correct as of match played on 17 September 2019

No.	Pos.	Player	League		FA Cup		Malaysia Cup		Total	
No.	Pos.	Player	Apps	Goals	Apps	Goals	Apps	Goals	Apps	Goals
1	GK	(Malaysia) Zarif Irfan	18	0	4	0	1	0	23	0
3	DF	(Malaysia) Rodney Celvin	18	1	4	0	4(1)	0	26(1)	1
4	DF	(Kyrgyzstan) Tamirlan Kozubaev	18(3)	3	3	0	5	0	26(3)	3
5	DF	(Malaysia) Nik Shahrul Azim	5(3)	0	0	0	6	0	11(3)	0
6	DF	(Malaysia) Nicholas Swirad	14(1)	3	3	0	3(1)	1	20(2)	4
7	MF	(Malaysia) K. Gurusamy	11(5)	0	2	1	2(2)	0	15(7)	1
8	MF	(Malaysia) Tommy Mawat	4(7)	0	2(1)	0	1(4)	0	7(12)	0
9	FW	(Liberia) Kpah Sherman	19	14	4	2	5(1)	2	28(1)	18
10	MF	(Colombia) Romel Morales	22	7	3	0	6	2	31	9
11	FW	(Malaysia) Jafri Firdaus Chew	5(6)	1	0(2)	0	5(1)	1	10(9)	2
12	DF	(Malaysia) Qayyum Marjoni	15(2)	0	3	0	5	0	23(2)	0
13	MF	(Malaysia) R. Surendran	6(4)	1	1(1)	0	1(2)	0	8(7)	1
14	MF	(Malaysia) Akram Mahinan	19(1)	0	4	0	4(1)	0	27(2)	0
15	DF	(Malaysia) Padathan Gunalan	3(4)	0	0	0	1	0	4(4)	0
16	FW	(Malaysia) Faizat Ghazli	7(3)	0	3(1)	0	0	0	10(4)	0
17	DF	(Malaysia) Kannan Kalaiselvan	4(2)	0	0(1)	0	0	0	4(3)	0
18	MF	(Malaysia) Mahali Jasuli	7(4)	0	1(2)	0	4(2)	0	12(8)	0
20	FW	(Argentina) Gabriel Guerra	20(2)	4	2(2)	1	4(1)	2	26(5)	7
21	GK	(Malaysia) Farhan Abu Bakar	3	0	0	0	0	0	3	0
22	GK	(Malaysia) Tauffiq Ar Rasyid	1(1)	0	0	0	5	0	6(1)	0
23	MF	(Malaysia) Alif Haikal	2(3)	0	1(1)	0	0(1)	0	3(5)	0
25	DF	(Malaysia) Shahrom Kalam	2(4)	0	1	0	1	0	4(4)	0
27	MF	(Malaysia) Ariff Farhan	4(1)	0	0(1)	0	2	0	6(2)	0
29	FW	(Thailand) Kittiphong Pluemjai	0(3)	1	0	0	1	0	1(3)	1
32	FW	(Malaysia) Asraff Aliffuddin	0	0	0	0	0(1)	0	0(1)	0
34	DF	(Malaysia) Shivan Pillay	0(2)	0	0	0	0	0	0(2)	0
36	FW	(Malaysia) Aliff Haiqal	2	0	0	0	0	0	2	0
Players away from the club on loan or left the club
17	DF	(Malaysia) Fandi Othman	1(1)	0	0	0	0	0	1(1)	0
26	FW	(Malaysia) Shafiq Shaharudin	0	0	0	0	0	0	0	0
29	FW	(Cambodia) Chan Vathanaka	12(3)	2	3	1	0	0	15(3)	3
