= 2019 Perlis FA season =

Perlis
2019 season
- President: Amizal Shaifit Ahmad Rafie
- Head coach: Manzoor Azwira
- Stadium: Tuanku Syed Putra Stadium
- Premier League: Disqualified
- FA Cup: To be determined
- Malaysia Cup: To be determined
- Top goalscorer: League: Khyril Muhymeen; Kevin Osei (2); All: Khyril Muhymeen; Kevin Osei (2)
Home colours	Away colours	Third colours

The 2019 Perlis season is the club 1st season in Malaysian football after rebranded as Perlis Northern Lions Football Club.

== Management team ==
Position	Name
Football director	(England) Matt Holland
Team coordinator	(Malaysia) Nor Hisham Abas
Head coach	(Malaysia) Manzoor Azwira
Assistant head coach	(Malaysia) Kamal Daud
Assistant coach	(Malaysia) Faizal Esahar
Goalkeeper coach	(Malaysia) Hisham Jainudin
Fitness coach	(Malaysia) Nizan Ariffin
Team doctor	(Malaysia) Dr. Ferdhany Muhamad Effendi
Physiotherapist	(Malaysia) Shadiduddin Sehat
Physiotherapist	(Malaysia) Afnan Hazizi Mohd
Kit man	(Malaysia) Sabireen Mat Saad
Kit man	(Malaysia) Muammar Firdaus Fadzil

== Players ==
The number of foreign players is restricted to four each team including at least one player from the AFC country.

No.	Pos.	Player	Nationality	Date of birth (age)	Signed from	Since
1	GK	Syazani Puat	(Malaysia)	20 May 1994 (age 31)	PKNP	2019
2	DF	Nasriq Baharom	(Malaysia)	8 February 1987 (age 39)	Negeri Sembilan	2019
3	DF	Azmi Muslim	(Malaysia)	17 October 1986 (age 39)	Melaka United	2019
4	MF	Che Safwan Hazman	(Malaysia)	15 December 1995 (age 30)	UiTM	2019
5	DF	Masaki Watanabe	(Japan)	2 December 1986 (age 39)	Yokohama	2019
6	MF	Wellington Priori	(Brazil)	21 February 1990 (age 35)	Botafogo	2019
7	MF	Fahrul Razi	(Malaysia)	12 April 1986 (age 39)	Petaling Jaya Rangers	2019
8	MF	Shukor Azmi	(Malaysia)	1 February 1993 (age 33)	PKNP	2019
9	FW	Valci Júnior	(Brazil)	14 February 1987 (age 38)	Phnom Penh Crown	2019
10	FW	Safee Sali (c)	(Malaysia)	29 January 1984 (age 42)	PKNS	2019
11	MF	Nazrin Syamsul	(Malaysia)	11 September 1990 (age 35)	PKNS	2019
12	DF	Syamim Baharuddin	(Malaysia)	18 March 1996 (age 29)	PKNP	2019
13	MF	Syukur Saidin	(Malaysia)	12 November 1991 (age 34)	Penang	2019
14	MF	Fakhrullah Rosli	(Malaysia)	21 February 1990 (age 35)	MOF	2019
15	DF	Fairuz Zakaria	(Malaysia)			2019
16	MF	Badhri Radzi	(Malaysia)	2 June 1982 (age 43)	Kelantan	2019
17	DF	Azmizi Azmi	(Malaysia)	28 May 1986 (age 39)	PKNS	2019
18	FW	Khyril Muhymeen	(Malaysia)	9 May 1987 (age 38)	PKNS	2019
19	FW	Yusri Abas	(Malaysia)	28 February 1988 (age 37)	UiTM	2019
20	DF	Syazwan Roslan	(Malaysia)	22 March 1988 (age 37)	MOF	2019
21	MF	Hafizi Amiruddin	(Malaysia)	18 September 1988 (age 37)	MOF	2019
22	FW	Faizwan Abdullah	(Malaysia)	9 February 1994 (age 32)	Petaling Jaya Rangers	2019
23	MF	Jasmir Mehat	(Malaysia)	6 February 1994 (age 32)	Terengganu City	2019
24	DF	Amirizdwan Taj	(Malaysia)	30 March 1986 (age 39)	Kelantan	2019
25	GK	Shahril Saa'ri	(Malaysia)	7 March 1990 (age 35)	PKNS	2019
26	MF	Fadhilah Pauzi	(Malaysia)	23 April 1996 (age 29)	Kelantan	2019
27	DF	Sabri Adam	(Malaysia)	27 November 1993 (age 32)	Terengganu City	2019
28	DF	Aziz Ismail	(Malaysia)	7 August 1988 (age 37)	Unattached	2019
29	GK	Fikri Che Soh	(Malaysia)	1 February 1998 (age 28)	Kelantan	2019
30	MF	Kevin Osei	(France)	26 March 1991 (age 34)	Lokomotiv GO	2019

== Transfers ==
=== In ===
No.	Pos	Player	Transferred from	Fee	Date	Source
16	MF	(Malaysia) Badhri Radzi	(Malaysia) Kelantan	Free transfer	5 December 2018	
1	GK	(Malaysia) Syazani Puat	(Malaysia) PKNP	Free transfer	8 December 2018	
7	MF	(Malaysia) Fahrul Razi	(Malaysia) Petaling Jaya Rangers	Free transfer	10 December 2018	
25	GK	(Malaysia) Shahril Saa'ri	(Malaysia) PKNS	Free transfer	25 December 2018	
2	DF	(Malaysia) Nasriq Baharom	(Malaysia) Negeri Sembilan	Free transfer	12 January 2019	
5	FW	(Japan) Masaki Watanabe	(Japan) Yokohama	Free transfer	24 January 2019	
6	MF	(Brazil) Wellington Priori	(Brazil) Botafogo	Free transfer	24 January 2019	
9	FW	(Brazil) Valci Júnior	(Cambodia) Phnom Penh Crown	Free transfer	24 January 2019	
30	MF	(France) Kevin Osei	(Bulgaria) Lokomotiv GO	Free transfer	24 January 2019	

== Competitions ==
=== Malaysia Premier League ===
==== League table ====
Pos	Team	Pld	W	D	L	GF	GA	GD	Pts	Qualification or relegation
8	UKM	20	6	4	10	28	32	−4	22	
9	Selangor United	20	6	3	11	24	37	−13	21	
10	Kelantan	20	4	8	8	23	32	−9	17 (Note: Kelantan have been docked three points following the club’s failure to comply with FIFA’s decision over claims made by former technical director Alfredo Carlos Gonzalez.)	
11	Sarawak (R)	20	4	4	12	25	44	−19	16	Qualification to relegation play-off
12	Perlis (Note: Perlis were disqualified on 20 February 2019.)	0	0	0	0	0	0	0	0	Disqualified

Source: MFL
Rules for classification: 1) Points; 2) Goal difference; 3) Number of goals scored.
(R) Relegated

==== Results by round ====
Round	1	2	3
Ground	A	A	A
Result	L	W	L
Position	8	4	8

Updated to match(es) played on 8 February 2019. Source: Matches
A = Away; H = Home; W = Win; D = Draw; L = Loss

==== Matches ====
3 February 2019 1	UKM	1–2	Perlis	Bandar Tun Razak
21:00 UTC+8	Faiz Hanif 22'; Wan Faiz 56'; Akmal Zahir (yellow card) 82'; Roskam (yellow card) 90+2'	Report	Valci Júnior 62'; Fakhrullah (yellow card) 73'; Shukor (yellow card) 75'	Stadium: Kuala Lumpur Stadium; Referee: Mohamad Faizudin Ismail

8 February 2019 2	UiTM	0–3	Perlis	Shah Alam
21:00 UTC+8	Mendy (yellow card) 36'; Agele (yellow card) 63'	Report	Khyril 33', 40', (yellow card) 33'; Osei 73'	Stadium: UiTM Stadium; Referee: Mohd Sarif Tahir

15 February 2019 3	Johor Darul Ta'zim II	2–1	Perlis	Pasir Gudang
21:00 UTC+8	Soares 73'; Fernández 90+1'	Report	Azmizi (yellow card) 33'; Nazrin (yellow card) 34'; Osei 86', (yellow card) 90+3'	Stadium: Pasir Gudang Corporation Stadium; Referee: Mohd Sarif Tahir

== Statistics ==
=== Appearances and goals ===
No.	Pos	Nat	Player	Total		Premier League		FA Cup		Malaysia Cup	
No.	Pos	Nat	Player	Apps	Goals	Apps	Goals	Apps	Goals	Apps	Goals
Goalkeepers
1	GK	(Malaysia) MAS	Syazani Puat	0	0	0	0	0	0	0	0
25	GK	(Malaysia) MAS	Shahril Saa'ri	3	0	3	0	0	0	0	0
29	GK	(Malaysia) MAS	Fikri Che Soh	0	0	0	0	0	0	0	0
Defenders
2	DF	(Malaysia) MAS	Nasriq Baharom	0	0	0	0	0	0	0	0
3	DF	(Malaysia) MAS	Azmi Muslim	3	0	3	0	0	0	0	0
4	DF	(Malaysia) MAS	Che Safwan Hazman	0	0	0	0	0	0	0	0
5	DF	(Japan) JPN	Masaki Watanabe	3	0	3	0	0	0	0	0
7	DF	(Malaysia) MAS	Fahrul Razi	3	0	3	0	0	0	0	0
15	DF	(Malaysia) MAS	Fairuz Zakaria	0	0	0	0	0	0	0	0
17	DF	(Malaysia) MAS	Azmizi Azmi	3	0	2+1	0	0	0	0	0
20	DF	(Malaysia) MAS	Syazwan Roslan	0	0	0	0	0	0	0	0
24	DF	(Malaysia) MAS	Amirizdwan Taj	3	0	1+2	0	0	0	0	0
27	DF	(Malaysia) MAS	Sabri Adam	0	0	0	0	0	0	0	0
28	DF	(Malaysia) MAS	Aziz Ismail	1	0	0+1	0	0	0	0	0
Midfielders
6	MF	(Brazil) BRA	Wellington Priori	1	0	1	0	0	0	0	0
8	MF	(Malaysia) MAS	Shukor Azmi	3	0	2+1	0	0	0	0	0
11	MF	(Malaysia) MAS	Nazrin Syamsul	3	0	3	0	0	0	0	0
12	MF	(Malaysia) MAS	Syamim Baharuddin	0	0	0	0	0	0	0	0
13	MF	(Malaysia) MAS	Syukur Saidin	1	0	0+1	0	0	0	0	0
16	MF	(Malaysia) MAS	Badhri Radzi	1	0	0+1	0	0	0	0	0
21	MF	(Malaysia) MAS	Hafizi Amiruddin	3	0	3	0	0	0	0	0
23	MF	(Malaysia) MAS	Jasmir Mehat	1	0	0+1	0	0	0	0	0
26	MF	(Malaysia) MAS	Fadhilah Pauzi	0	0	0	0	0	0	0	0
30	MF	(France) FRA	Kevin Osei	2	2	2	2	0	0	0	0
Forwards
9	FW	(Brazil) BRA	Valci Júnior	2	1	1+1	1	0	0	0	0
14	FW	(Malaysia) MAS	Fakhrullah Rosli	1	0	1	0	0	0	0	0
18	FW	(Malaysia) MAS	Khyril Muhymeen	2	2	2	2	0	0	0	0
19	FW	(Malaysia) MAS	Yusri Abas	0	0	0	0	0	0	0	0
22	FW	(Malaysia) MAS	Faizwan Abdullah	0	0	0	0	0	0	0	0
Players transferred out during the season
10	FW	(Malaysia) MAS	Safee Sali	3	0	3	0	0	0	0	0

Last updated: 15 February 2019
Source: Competitions
