= 2017 PKNS F.C. season =

PKNS
2017 season
- President: Siti Zubaidah Abdul Jabar
- Manager: Mahfizul Rusydin Abdul Rashid
- Head Coach: E. Elavarasan (until 7 July); Adam Abdullah (8 July until 16 July); Sven Gartung (from 17 July)
- Stadium: Shah Alam Stadium (Capacity: 80,372)
- Liga Super: 7th
- Piala FA: Second round
- Piala Malaysia: Group stage
- Top goalscorer: League: Patrick Wleh (8); All: Patrick Wleh (10)
- Highest home attendance: 6,113 vs Selangor (4 February 2017)
- Lowest home attendance: 44 vs T-Team (26 July 2017)
- Average home league attendance: 2,748
Home colours	Away colours

The 2017 season was PKNS's 4th season in the top flight of Malaysian football, the Liga Super after being promoted from 2016 Liga Premier.

== Foreign players ==
Note: Flags indicate national team as defined under FIFA eligibility rules; some limited exceptions apply. Players may hold more than one non-FIFA nationality.

No.	Pos.	Nation	Player
2	MF	(South Korea) KOR	Park Kwang-il
4	FW	(Liberia) LBR	Patrick Wleh
12	DF	(The Gambia) GAM	Abdou Jammeh
21	MF	(Portugal) POR	Fábio Ferreira

== Results and fixtures ==
=== Overview ===
Competition	Record							
Competition	P	W	D	L	GF	GA	GD	Win %
Liga Super	22	6	7	9	33	38	−5	27.27
Piala FA	1	0	0	1	0	1	−1	0.00
Piala Malaysia	6	0	1	5	4	12	−8	0.00
Total	29	6	8	15	37	51	−14	20.69

Updated to match played 28 October 2017
Source: Competitions

=== Liga Super ===
Win Draw Loss

21 January 2017 1	FELDA United (Kuala Lumpur)	1−0	(Selangor) PKNS	Jengka, Pahang
21:00 UTC+8	Norshahrul 67'	Report		Stadium: Tun Abdul Razak Stadium; Attendance: 2,277; Referee: Zamzaidi Katimin

27 January 2017 2	PKNS (Selangor)	1−3	Kelantan	Shah Alam, Selangor
16:45 UTC+8	Gonzalo 45+2'	Report	Ghaddar 20', 22' (pen.); Badhri 48'	Stadium: Shah Alam Stadium; Attendance: 6,080; Referee: Khairul Azuan Kidam

4 February 2017 3	PKNS (Selangor)	5−3	Selangor	Shah Alam, Selangor
16:45 UTC+8	Wleh 20', 43', 58'; Safee 25'; Jadue 47'	Report	Syahmi 1'; Doe 28', 55'	Stadium: Shah Alam Stadium; Attendance: 6,113; Referee: Mohd Fairuzi Mat Desa

11 February 2017 4	PKNS (Selangor)	3−0	Perak	Shah Alam, Selangor
16:45 UTC+8	Lucas 45', 47'; Safee 85'	Report		Stadium: Shah Alam Stadium; Attendance: 4,882; Referee: Suhaimi Mat Hassan

18 February 2017 5	T−Team (Terengganu)	2−2	(Selangor) PKNS	Kuala Terengganu, Terengganu
21:00 UTC+8	Tadjiyev 10', 45+1'	Report	Khairul 79'; Jadue 90'	Stadium: Sultan Ismail Nasiruddin Shah Stadium; Attendance: 1,231; Referee: Zamzaidi Katimin

25 February 2017 6	PKNS (Selangor)	2−3	Sarawak	Shah Alam, Selangor
16:45 UTC+8	Espíndola 55'; Khairul 90+3'	Report	Roskam 18'; Hartmann 60'; Hafiz 63'	Stadium: Shah Alam Stadium; Attendance: 1,007; Referee: Suhaimi Mat Hassan

28 February 2017 7	Pahang	3−0	(Selangor) PKNS	Kuantan, Pahang
21:00 UTC+8	Afif 19'; Alves 58'; Ashari 70'	Report		Stadium: Darul Makmur Stadium; Attendance: 10,826; Referee: Suhaizi Shukri

4 March 2017 8	PKNS (Selangor)	1−1	Penang	Shah Alam, Selangor
16:45 UTC+8	Wleh 28'	Report	Dabinyaba 53'	Stadium: Shah Alam Stadium; Attendance: 281; Referee: Zulkarnain Zakaria

8 April 2017 9	Kedah	1−1	(Selangor) PKNS	Alor Setar, Kedah
21:00 UTC+8	Anderson 37'	Report	Espíndola 29'	Stadium: Darul Aman Stadium; Attendance: 2,000; Referee: Suhaimi Mat Hassan

15 April 2017 10	Johor Darul Ta'zim	2−1	(Selangor) PKNS	Larkin, Johor
21:00 UTC+8	Safiq 55' (pen.); Jadue 35' (o.g.)	Report	Bobby 33'	Stadium: Tan Sri Dato' Haji Hassan Yunos Stadium; Attendance: 13,325; Referee: Nagor Amir Noor Mohamed

26 April 2017 11	Melaka United (Malacca)	2−2	(Selangor) PKNS	Krubong, Malacca
21:00 UTC+8	Spasojević 33', 43'	Report	Wleh 36'; Safee 41'	Stadium: Hang Jebat Stadium; Attendance: 2,399; Referee: Khairul Azuan Kidam

6 May 2017 12	PKNS (Selangor)	4−4	Kedah	Shah Alam, Selangor
16:45 UTC+8	Wleh 13'; Jadue 60', 90+4'; Espíndola 89'	Report	Ilsø 5'; Syafiq 16', 23'; Mendonça 90+3'	Stadium: Shah Alam Stadium; Attendance: 4,290; Referee: Mohd Amirul Izwan Yaacob

24 May 2017 13	PKNS (Selangor)	0−1	Johor Darul Ta'zim	Shah Alam, Selangor
21:00 UTC+8		Report	Amirul Hadi Zainal 78'	Stadium: Shah Alam Stadium; Attendance: 3,754; Referee: Mohd Zohri Tajuddin

1 July 2017 14	PKNS (Selangor)	1−1	(Malacca) Melaka United	Shah Alam, Selangor
21:00 UTC+8	Safee 70' (pen.)	Report	De Souza 50'	Stadium: Shah Alam Stadium; Attendance: 2,616; Referee: Muhd Nazmi Nasaruddin

11 July 2017 15	Penang	0−2	(Selangor) PKNS	Batu Kawan, Penang
21:00 UTC+8		Report	Wleh 53'; Jammeh 80'	Stadium: Penang State Stadium; Attendance: 2,173; Referee: Mohd Amirul Izwan Yaacob

15 July 2017 16	PKNS (Selangor)	1−3	Pahang	Shah Alam, Selangor
21:00 UTC+8	Alif 82'	Report	Sumareh 36'; Alves 63', 71'	Stadium: Shah Alam Stadium; Attendance: 1,092; Referee: Khairul Azuan Kidam

22 July 2017 17	Sarawak	0−1	(Selangor) PKNS	Kuching, Sarawak
20:15 UTC+8		Report	Alif 69'	Stadium: Sarawak State Stadium; Attendance: 1,211++ Referee: Suhaimi Mat Hassan

26 July 2017 18	PKNS (Selangor)	2−1	(Terengganu) T-Team	Shah Alam, Selangor
21:00 UTC+8	Alif 35'; Nizam 42'	Report	Asrol 67'	Stadium: Shah Alam Stadium; Attendance: 44; Referee: Nagor Amir Noor Mohamed

5 August 2017 19	Perak	2−0	(Selangor) PKNS	Ipoh, Perak
21:00 UTC+8	Nazrin 55'; Gilmar 59'	Report		Stadium: Perak Stadium; Attendance: 5,310; Referee: Zulkarnain Zakaria

20 September 2017 20	Selangor	1−2	(Selangor) PKNS	Selayang, Selangor
21:00 UTC+8	Rufino 34'	Report	Shahrul 25'; Wleh 64'	Stadium: MP Selayang Stadium; Attendance: 847; Referee: Zamzaidi Katimin

30 September 2017 21	Kelantan	0−0	(Selangor) PKNS	Kota Bharu, Kelantan
21:00 UTC+8		Report		Stadium: Sultan Muhammad IV Stadium; Attendance: 5,076; Referee: Muhd Nazmi Nasaruddin

28 October 2017 22	PKNS (Selangor)	2−4	(Kuala Lumpur) FELDA United	Shah Alam, Selangor
21:00 UTC+8	Shahrul 23'; Jammeh 90'	Report	Thiago Augusto 50', 73', 90+3'; Zah Rahan 90+1'	Stadium: Shah Alam Stadium; Attendance: 75; Referee: Suhaimi Mat Hassan

Source: Fixtures / Result

==== League table ====
Pos	Team	Pld	W	D	L	GF	GA	GD	Pts	Qualification or relegation
5	Perak	22	9	7	6	30	31	−1	34	
6	Selangor	22	9	6	7	32	28	+4	33	
7	PKNS	22	6	7	9	33	38	−5	25	
8	Melaka United	22	6	6	10	33	46	−13	24	
9	T–Team (R)	22	7	5	10	30	45	−15	23 (Note: Kelantan and T–Team was sentenced to a six-point deduction immediately on offense failed to complete the registration process Malaysian League (M-League) 2017. Later, upon careful consideration of the aforementioned appeals, Football Malaysia have decided to lift the transfer ban and reduce the deduction of 6 points to 3 points for T-Team.)	Relegation to Premier League

Source: FAM, FMLLP
Rules for classification: 1) Points; 2) Goal difference; 3) Number of goals scored.
(R) Relegated

=== Piala FA ===
Win Draw Loss

14 February 2017 Second Round	Melaka United (Malacca)	1−0	(Selangor) PKNS	Krubong, Malacca
21:00 UTC+8	Amri 66'	Report		Stadium: Hang Jebat Stadium; Attendance: 4,002; Referee: Zulkarnain Zakaria

=== Piala Malaysia ===
==== Group stage ====
Pos	Team	Pld	W	D	L	GF	GA	GD	Pts	Qualification	PRK	FLDU	KUL	PKNS
1	Perak	6	5	1	0	13	3	+10	16	Advance to knockout phase	—	2–1	2–0	2–0
2	(Pahang) FELDA United	6	3	2	1	11	7	+4	11	Advance to knockout phase	1–1	—	0–0	3–2
3	Kuala Lumpur	6	1	2	3	3	9	−6	5		0–3	1–4	—	2–0
4	(Selangor) PKNS	6	0	1	5	4	12	−8	1		1–3	1–2	0–0	—

Updated to match(es) played on 9 September 2017. Source: FAM FMLLP

Win Draw Loss

4 July 2017 Group Stage	Perak	2−0	(Selangor) PKNS	Ipoh, Perak
21:00 UTC+8	Thiago Junior 71'; Gilmar 80'	Report		Stadium: Perak Stadium; Attendance: 5,200; Referee: Fitri Maskon

8 July 2017 Group Stage	PKNS (Selangor)	1−2	(Kuala Lumpur) FELDA United	Shah Alam, Selangor
21:00 UTC+8	Wleh 45+2'	Report	Zah Rahan 5'; Thiago Augusto 88'	Stadium: Shah Alam Stadium; Attendance: 210; Referee: Suhaimi Mat Hassan

18 July 2017 Group Stage	PKNS (Selangor)	0−0	Kuala Lumpur	Shah Alam, Selangor
21:00 UTC+8		Report		Stadium: Shah Alam Stadium; Attendance: 44; Referee: Fitri Maskon

29 July 2017 Group Stage	PKNS (Selangor)	1−3	Perak	Shah Alam, Selangor
21:00 UTC+8	Wleh 83'	Report	Pinto 28'; Nazrin 61'; Gilmar 77'	Stadium: Shah Alam Stadium; Attendance: 2,966; Referee: Zamzaidi Katimin

1 August 2017 Group stage	FELDA United (Kuala Lumpur)	3−2	(Selangor) PKNS	Jengka, Pahang
21:00 UTC+8	Olusegun 46', 75'; Shukor 73'	Report	Bobby 31'; Nazrin 61' (pen.)	Stadium: Tun Abdul Razak Stadium; Attendance: 1,129; Referee: Mohd Nafeez Abdul Wahab

9 September 2017 Group stage	Kuala Lumpur	2−0	(Selangor) PKNS	Krubong, Melaka
21:00 UTC+8	Guilherme 47', 83'	Report		Stadium: Hang Jebat Stadium; Attendance: 115; Referee: Ku Alauddin Ku Muhammad

== Statistics ==
=== Squad appearances ===
Correct as of match played on 28 October 2017

No.	Pos.	Name	League	Piala FA	Piala Malaysia	Total
1	GK	(Malaysia) G. Jeevananthan	0	0	0	0
2	MF	(South Korea) Park Kwang-il	8	0	4	12
3	DF	(Malaysia) Mohd Azmi Muslim	14+5	1	4	19+5
4	FW	(Liberia) Patrick Wleh	20	1	4	25
5	MF	(Malaysia) Shahrul Azhar Ture	10+5	1	4	15+5
6	MF	(Malaysia) Munir Amran	0	0	0	0
7	MF	(Malaysia) P. Rajesh	9+1	0	2+1	11+2
8	MF	(Malaysia) Khairu Azrin Khazali	0+1	0	4+1	4+2
9	FW	(Malaysia) Bobby Gonzales	3+5	0+1	3+1	6+7
10	FW	(Malaysia) Safee Sali	13+1	1	0+1	14+2
11	MF	(Malaysia) Nazrin Syamsul Bahri	15+2	1	3+1	19+3
12	DF	(The Gambia) Abdou Jammeh	9	0	5	14
13	MF	(Malaysia) Mohd Fauzan Dzulkifli	12	0	2	14
14	MF	(Malaysia) Khyril Muhymeen Zambri	3+9	0	2	5+9
15	DF	(Malaysia) P. Gunalan	9+1	0	2	11+1
16	DF	(Malaysia) Azreen Zulkafli	6	0	1	7
17	DF	(Malaysia) Abdul Ghani Rahman	1+3	0	2	3+3
18	MF	(Malaysia) M. Sivakumar	14+1	1	4	19+1
19	MF	(Malaysia) Khairul Ramadhan Zauwawi	2+6	0	2+1	4+7
20	MF	(Malaysia) Affize Faisal Mamat	4+1	0	1+1	5+2
21	FW	(Portugal) Fábio Ferreira	4+2	0	2+4	6+6
22	GK	(Malaysia) Zamir Selamat	10+1	1	3	14+1
23	MF	(Malaysia) Alif Haikal Sabri	9+5	1	3+1	13+6
24	DF	(Malaysia) Nizam Abu Bakar	5+4	0	2+1	7+5
25	GK	(Malaysia) Nor Haziq Aris	6+1	0	0	6+1
26	DF	(Malaysia) Amirizdwan Taj	2	0	0	2
27	DF	(Malaysia) Azmizi Azmi	4+1	0	2	6+1
29	MF	(Malaysia) K. Gurusamy	8+3	0+1	2+1	10+5
30	GK	(Malaysia) Tauffiq Ar Rasyid Johar	6	0	3	9
31	MF	(Malaysia) Nur Iqmal Harun ^{U21}	0	0	0	0
32	MF	(Malaysia) Amir Hafiz Mohd Noor ^{U21}	0	0	0+1	0+1
33	FW	(Malaysia) Shafizi Iqmal ^{U19}	0	0	0+1	0+1
34	MF	(Malaysia) Sunil Caven Chandran ^{U19}	0	0	0	0
35	DF	(Malaysia) Shivan Pillay Asokan ^{U19}	0	0	0+1	0+1
Players who left the club during season or on loan
–	DF	(Malaysia) Mohd Sabre Mat Abu	0	0	0	0
–	DF	(Argentina) Gonzalo Soto	12	1	0	13
–	MF	(Palestine) Matías Jadue	12	1	0	13
–	MF	(Malaysia) S. Sivanesan	3+2	0	0	3+2
–	FW	(Argentina) Lucas Espíndola	10	1	0	11
–	FW	(Malaysia) Arip Amiruddin	0	0	0	0

* U19 = Under-19 player
* U21 = Under-21 player

=== Top scorers ===
Correct as of match played on 28 October 2017

The list is sorted by shirt number when total goals are equal.

Rnk	No.	Player	Pos	Liga Super	Piala FA	Piala Malaysia	Total
1	4	(Liberia) Patrick Wleh	FW	8	0	2	10
2	21	(Argentina) **Lucas Espíndola**	FW	5	0	0	5
3	30	(Palestine) **Matías Jadue**	MF	4	0	0	4
3	10	(Malaysia) Safee Sali	FW	4	0	0	4
5	23	(Malaysia) Alif Haikal Sabri	MF	3	0	0	3
6	9	(Malaysia) Bobby Gonzales	FW	1	0	1	2
6	19	(Malaysia) Khairul Ramadhan	MF	2	0	0	2
6	12	(The Gambia) Abdou Jammeh	DF	2	0	0	2
9	12	(Argentina) **Gonzalo Soto**	DF	1	0	0	1
9	24	(Malaysia) Nizam Abu Bakar	DF	1	0	0	1
9	11	(Malaysia) Nazrin Syamsul Bahri	MF	0	0	1	1
9	5	(Malaysia) Shahrul Azhar Ture	MF	1	0	0	1
**Total**				**32**	**0**	**4**	**36**

* Player names in bold denotes player that left mid-season

=== Clean sheets ===
Correct as of match played on 28 October 2017

The list is sorted by shirt number when total clean sheets are equal.

Rnk	No.	Player	Liga Super	Piala FA	Piala Malaysia	Total
1	30	(Malaysia) Tauffiq Ar Rasyid Johar	3	0	1	4
2	22	(Malaysia) Zamir Selamat	1	0	0	1
**Total**			**4**	**0**	**1**	**5**

== Transfers ==
First transfer window started in December 2017 to 22 January 2017 and second transfer window will started on 15 May 2017 to 11 June 2017.

=== In ===
==== First window ====
Date	Pos	Player	Transferred From
1 January 2017	FW	(Argentina) Lucas Espíndola	(Argentina) All Boys
1 January 2017	FW	(Liberia) Patrick Wleh	Selangor
1 January 2017	FW	(Malaysia) Arip Amiruddin	(Kuala Lumpur) DRB-Hicom
1 January 2017	DF	(Malaysia) Azmizi Azmi	Perlis
1 January 2017	MF	(Malaysia) Affize Faisal Mamat	Terengganu
1 January 2017	MF	(Malaysia) S. Sivanesan	(Kuala Lumpur) Felda United
1 January 2017	MF	(Malaysia) K. Gurusamy	Sarawak
1 January 2017	DF	(Malaysia) Mohd Sabre Mat Abu	Kedah
1 January 2017	MF	(Malaysia) Bobby Gonzales	(Kuala Lumpur) Felda United
1 January 2017	DF	(Malaysia) Mohd Azmi Muslim	Selangor
1 January 2017	MF	(Malaysia) Mohd Fauzan Dzulkifli	Penang
1 January 2017	FW	(Malaysia) Safee Sali	Johor Darul Ta'zim
1 January 2017	MF	(Malaysia) Khyril Muhymeen Zambri	(Malaysia) AirAsia
1 January 2017	GK	(Malaysia) Zamir Selamat	Perak
1 January 2017	DF	(Malaysia) Amirizdwan Taj	Unattached

==== Second window ====
Date	Pos	Player	Transferred From
June 2017	MF	(Malaysia) Khairu Azrin Khazali	(Malacca) Melaka United
June 2017	DF	(The Gambia) Abdou Jammeh	(Qatar) Al-Shamal
June 2017	MF	(South Korea) Park Kwang-il	(Japan) Ehime
June 2017	MF	(Portugal) Fábio Ferreira	(Australia) Central Coast Mariners
June 2017	GK	(Malaysia) Tauffiq Ar Rasyid Johar	Unattached
July 2017	DF	(Malaysia) Shivan Pillay Asokan	(Selangor) PKNS U19
July 2017	MF	(Malaysia) Sunil Caven Chandran	(Selangor) PKNS U19
July 2017	FW	(Malaysia) Shafizi Iqmal	(Selangor) PKNS U19
July 2017	MF	(Malaysia) Amir Hafiz Mohd Noor	(Selangor) PKNS U21
July 2017	MF	(Malaysia) Nur Iqmal Harun	(Selangor) PKNS U21

=== Out ===
==== First window ====
Date	Pos	Player	Transferred To
1 January 2017	GK	(Malaysia) Mohd Remezey Che Ros	Kuala Lumpur
1 January 2017	DF	(Malaysia) Mohd Zaiza Zainal Abidin	(Selangor) PBMS
1 January 2017	DF	(Malaysia) Mohd Farid Ramli	(Kuala Lumpur) Felda United
1 January 2017	MF	(Malaysia) Khairu Azrin Khazali	(Malacca) Melaka United
1 January 2017	MF	(Malaysia) S. Thinagaran	Kelantan
1 January 2017	MF	(Malaysia) Yusaini Hafiz	Free agent
1 January 2017	MF	(Malaysia) Fazli Baharuddin	(Selangor) PBMS
1 January 2017	MF	(Argentina) Juan Manuel Cobelli	(Italy) Taranto 1927
1 January 2017	FW	(Argentina) Gabriel Miguel Guerra	Johor Darul Ta'zim II
1 January 2017	FW	(Malaysia) K. Satish	Selangor
June 2017	MF	(Malaysia) S. Sivanesan	(Malacca) Melaka United
June 2017	DF	(Argentina) Gonzalo Soto	Free agent
June 2017	MF	(Palestine) Matías Jadue	(Thailand) Port
June 2017	FW	(Argentina) Lucas Espíndola	Free agent

==== Second window ====
Date	Pos	Player	Transferred To
June 2017	MF	(Malaysia) S. Sivanesan	(Malacca) Melaka United
June 2017	DF	(Argentina) Gonzalo Soto	Unattached
June 2017	MF	(Palestine) Matías Jadue	(Thailand) Port
June 2017	FW	(Argentina) Lucas Espíndola	(Argentina) Juventud Antoniana
June 2017	FW	(Malaysia) Arip Amiruddin	(Selangor) Petaling Jaya Rangers

=== Loan out ===
==== First window ====
Date	Pos	Player	Loaned To
1 January 2017	MF	(Malaysia) R. Thivagar	(Selangor) PBMS
1 January 2017	MF	(Malaysia) Adam Shafiq Fua'ad	(Selangor) PBMS
1 January 2017	MF	(Malaysia) Shahurain Abu Samah	PDRM
1 January 2017	FW	(Malaysia) Ahmad Shakir Mohd Ali	PDRM
1 January 2017	FW	(Malaysia) Farderin Kadir	Negeri Sembilan

==== Second window ====
Date	Pos	Player	Loaned To
1 June 2017	DF	(Malaysia) Mohd Sabre Mat Abu	Negeri Sembilan
