= 2018 PKNS F.C. season =

PKNS
2018 season
- President: Siti Zubaidah Abdul Jabar
- Manager: Mahfizul Rusydin Abdul Rashid
- Head Coach: K. Rajagobal
- Stadium: Shah Alam Stadium (Capacity: 80,372)
- Super League: 3rd
- FA Cup: Semi-finals
- Malaysia Cup: Quarter-finals
- Top goalscorer: League: Rafael Ramazotti; Bruno Matos (7); All: Rafael Ramazotti (13)
| Home colours | Away colours |

The 2018 season is PKNS's 5th season in the top flight of Malaysian football, the Malaysia Super League after being promoted from 2016 Malaysia Premier League.

== Club officials ==
| Position | Staff |
|---|---|
| Head coach | (Malaysia) K. Rajagobal |
| Assistant head coach | (Malaysia) Adam Abdullah |
| Goalkeeping coach | (Malaysia) Faozi |
| Fitness coach | (Slovakia) Matus Bozik |
| Assistant coach | (Malaysia) Khairul Abu Zahar |
| Team doctor | (Malaysia) Dr.Vijayan Munusamy |

== Transfers ==
=== First transfer ===
In: Note: Flags indicate national team as defined under FIFA eligibility rules; some limited exceptions apply. Players may hold more than one non-FIFA nationality.

| No. | Pos. | Nation | Player |
|---|---|---|---|
| 1 | GK | MAS | Zarif Irfan (from Selangor) |
| 2 | DF | MAS | K. Reuben (from Penang) |
| 3 | DF | MAS | Rodney Celvin (from Sarawak) |
| 4 | DF | MAS | Daniel Ting (from Johor Darul Ta'zim II) |
| 6 | MF | MAS | M. Tinnadkaran (from MIFA) |
| 8 | DF | AUS | Zac Anderson (from Kedah) |
| 9 | FW | MAS | Jafri Firdaus Chew (from Penang) |
| 12 | DF | MAS | Qayyum Marjoni (from Kelantan) |
| 16 | MF | MAS | Nurridzuan Abu Hassan (from Pahang) |
| 19 | MF | ARG | Jonathan Acosta (from (Colombia) Jaguares) |
| 20 | FW | MAS | Faizat Ghazli (from Penang) |
| 21 | MF | COL | Romel Morales (from (Argentina) Banfield) |
| 24 | DF | MAS | Annas Rahmat (from Negeri Sembilan) |
| 25 | GK | MAS | Shahril Saa'ri (from Sarawak) |
| 28 | DF | MAS | Mahali (on loan from Johor Darul Ta'zim) |
| 29 | FW | BRA | Rafael Ramazotti (from (Brunei) DPMM) |
| 30 | MF | SGP | Faris Ramli (from (Singapore) Home United) |

Out: Note: Flags indicate national team as defined under FIFA eligibility rules; some limited exceptions apply. Players may hold more than one non-FIFA nationality.

| No. | Pos. | Nation | Player |
|---|---|---|---|
| 1 | GK | MAS | G. Jeevananthan (unattached) |
| 2 | MF | KOR | Park Kwang-il (to (South Korea) Jeonnam Dragons) |
| 3 | DF | MAS | Azmi Muslim (to Melaka United) |
| 4 | FW | LBR | Patrick Wleh (to (Egypt) Ismaily) |
| 6 | MF | MAS | Munir Amran (unattached) |
| 7 | MF | MAS | P. Rajesh (to MISC-MIFA) |
| 8 | MF | MAS | Khairu Azrin (to Felda United) |
| 9 | FW | MAS | Bobby Gonzales (to Sarawak) |
| 12 | DF | GAM | Abdou Jammeh (unattached) |
| 13 | MF | MAS | Fauzan Dzulkifli (to Negeri Sembilan) |
| 16 | DF | MAS | Azreen Zulkafali (to Felda United) |
| 17 | DF | MAS | Abdul Ghani Rahman (to Kuantan) |
| 19 | MF | MAS | Khairul Ramadhan (to Hanelang) |
| 20 | FW | MAS | Affize Faisal (unattached) |
| 21 | MF | POR | Fábio Ferreira (to (Australia) Sydney FC) |
| 22 | GK | MAS | Zamir Selamat (to Melaka United) |
| 24 | DF | MAS | Nizam Abu Bakar (to Felcra) |
| 25 | GK | MAS | Nor Haziq Aris (to Kuantan) |
| 26 | DF | MAS | Amirizdwan Taj (to Kelantan) |
| — | DF | MAS | Sabre Abu (to Sarawak, previously on loan at Negeri Sembilan) |
| — | MF | MAS | R. Thivagar (unattached, previously on loan at PBMS) |
| — | MF | MAS | Adam Shafiq Fua'ad (unattached, previously on loan at PBMS) |
| — | FW | MAS | Shakir Ali (unattached, previously on loan at PDRM) |
| — | MF | MAS | Shahurain Abu Samah (PDRM, previously on loan at PDRM) |
| — | FW | MAS | Farderin Kadir (Melaka United, previously on loan at PKNS) |

=== Mid season transfer ===
In: Note: Flags indicate national team as defined under FIFA eligibility rules; some limited exceptions apply. Players may hold more than one non-FIFA nationality.

| No. | Pos. | Nation | Player |
|---|---|---|---|
| 6 | DF | MAS | Nik Shahrul Azim (from Kelantan) |
| 19 | MF | BRA | Bruno Matos (from (Brazil) Juazeirense) |

Out: Note: Flags indicate national team as defined under FIFA eligibility rules; some limited exceptions apply. Players may hold more than one non-FIFA nationality.

| No. | Pos. | Nation | Player |
|---|---|---|---|
| 19 | MF | ARG | Jonathan Acosta (unattached) |

== Pre-season and friendlies ==
| Date | Opponents | H / A | Result F–A | Scorers |
|---|---|---|---|---|
| 15 December 2017 | Negeri Sembilan | H | 1–1 | |
| 23 December 2017 | PKNP | H | 2–0 | Khyril, Morales |
| 30 December 2017 | Kuala Lumpur | A | 0–1 | |
| 6 January 2018 | PKNP | A | 3–1 | Safee, Morales, Nurridzuan |
| 20 January 2018 | Pattaya United | A | 1–1 | Safee |
| 23 January 2018 | Police Tero | A | 0–2 | |
| 26 January 2018 | Gyeongnam | A | 1–1 | |

== Malaysia Super League ==
| Date | Opponents | H / A | Result F–A | Scorers, Bookings | League position |
|---|---|---|---|---|---|
| 3 February 2018 | Terengganu | A | 2–2 | Qayyum 39', Ramazotti 69' | 5th |
| 7 February 2018 | Pahang | H | 1–0 | Safee 90+2' | 4th |
| 10 February 2018 | Perak | A | 2–0 | Ramazotti (2) 2', 63' | 1st |
| 25 February 2018 | Kedah | H | 3–4 | Faris 32', Mahali (2) 47', 90+5' | 4th |
| 9 March 2018 | Kelantan | H | 1–0 | Faris 40' | 3rd |
| 14 April 2018 | Johor Darul Ta'zim | A | 0–3 | | 5th |
| 27 April 2018 | PKNP | H | 1–1 | Nurridzuan 90+4' | 5th |
| 2 May 2018 | Kuala Lumpur | A | 1–2 | Faris 45' | 6th |
| 5 May 2018 | Melaka United | H | 2–0 | Ramazotti 69', Safee 80' | 4th |
| 13 May 2018 | Kuala Lumpur | H | 3–2 | Safee 10', Faris 38', Acosta 51' | 6th |
| 23 May 2018 | Melaka United | A | 1–1 | Jafri 43' | 6th |
| 27 May 2018 | Johor Darul Ta'zim | H | 0–0 | | 6th |
| 3 June 2018 | Negeri Sembilan | A | 1–3 | Morales 73' | 6th |
| 6 June 2018 | Selangor | A | 1–2 | Safee 43' | 6th |
| 10 June 2018 | Selangor | H | 2–2 | Ramazotti (2) 18', 90+2' | 6th |
| 19 June 2018 | Kelantan | A | 2–0 | Matos (2) 4', 87' | 6th |
| 26 June 2018 | Kedah | A | 0–2 | | 6th |
| 11 July 2018 | Negeri Sembilan | H | 5–3 | Faris 11', Safee 25', Matos 31', Morales 47', Khyril 90+2' | 6th |
| 14 July 2018 | Terengganu | H | 4–0 | Matos (2) 16' (pen.), 31', Anderson 38', Jafri 66' | 6th |
| 18 July 2018 | PKNP | A | 1–0 | Faris 5' | 3rd |
| 21 July 2018 | Pahang | A | 0–1 | | 5th |
| 28 July 2018 | Perak | H | 4–1 | Matos (2) 3', 79', Ramazotti 40', Morales 90+4' | 3rd |

| Pos | Team | Pld | W | D | L | GF | GA | GD | Pts | Qualification or relegation |
|---|---|---|---|---|---|---|---|---|---|---|
| 1 | Johor Darul Ta'zim (C) | 22 | 19 | 2 | 1 | 47 | 9 | +38 | 59 | Qualification for the AFC Champions League group stage |
| 2 | Perak | 22 | 10 | 6 | 6 | 35 | 27 | +8 | 36 | Qualification for the AFC Champions League second preliminary round |
| 3 | PKNS | 22 | 10 | 5 | 7 | 37 | 29 | +8 | 35 | |
| 4 | Pahang | 22 | 9 | 7 | 6 | 35 | 21 | +14 | 34 | |
| 5 | Terengganu | 22 | 10 | 4 | 8 | 32 | 31 | +1 | 34 | |

Source: FAM, FMLLP
Rules for classification: 1) Points; 2) Goal difference; 3) Number of goals scored.
(C) Champions

== Malaysia FA Cup ==
| Date | Round | Opponents | H / A | Result F–A | Scorers | Attendance |
|---|---|---|---|---|---|---|
| 2 March 2018 | Second round | Hanelang | H | 4–1 | Jafri 10', Morales 38', Ramazotti 57', Nurridzuan 70' | |
| 17 March 2018 | Third round | Kelantan | H | 4–1 | Morales 15', Mahali 42', Safee 60', Ramazotti 65' | |
| 7 April 2018 | Quarter-final First leg | Perak | H | 2–1 | Faris 25', Safee 89' | |
| 21 April 2018 | Quarter-final Second leg | Perak | A | 2–2 | Rodney 55', Gurusamy 64' (pen.) | |
| 23 June 2018 | Semi-final First leg | Selangor | A | 0–4 | | |
| 30 June 2018 | Semi-final Second leg | Selangor | H | 1–1 | Alif Haikal 90' | |

== Malaysia Cup ==
=== Group stage ===
| Date | Opponents | H / A | Result F–A | Scorers | Attendance | Group position |
|---|---|---|---|---|---|---|
| 5 August 2018 | PDRM | A | 5–2 | Morales 26' (pen.), Daniel 47', Faris 63', Ramazotti 73', Safee 90+1' | | 1st |
| 11 August 2018 | Melaka United | A | 3–3 | Morales 87', Matos 90+1', Ramazotti 90+3' | | 1st |
| 19 August 2018 | Felda United | H | 2–3 | Faris 16', Ramazotti 90+3' | | 2nd |
| 28 August 2018 | Felda United | A | 0–1 | Mahali 11' | | 2nd |
| 1 September 2018 | Melaka United | H | 2–1 | Morales 24', Ramazotti 66' | | 2nd |
| 15 September 2018 | PDRM | H | 5–0 | Jafri 4', Matos 13', 21', 77', Faizat 54', | | 1st |

==== Knock-stage ====
| Date | Opponents | H / A | Result F–A | Scorers | Attendance | Round position |
|---|---|---|---|---|---|---|
| 25 September 2018 | Perak TBG | A | 0–0 | | | Quarter-finals leg 1 |
| 30 September 2018 | Perak TBG | H | 0–2 | | | Quarter-finals leg 2 |

| Pos | Team | Pld | W | D | L | GF | GA | GD | Pts | Qualification | PKNS | FEL | MEL | PDRM |
|---|---|---|---|---|---|---|---|---|---|---|---|---|---|---|
| 1 | PKNS | 6 | 4 | 1 | 1 | 18 | 9 | +9 | 13 | Advance to knockout stage | — | 2–3 | 2–1 | 5–0 |
| 2 | FELDA United | 6 | 3 | 1 | 2 | 11 | 9 | +2 | 10 | Advance to knockout stage | 0–1 | — | 0–0 | 2–0 |
| 3 | Melaka United | 6 | 2 | 3 | 1 | 18 | 9 | +9 | 9 | | 3–3 | 6–1 | — | 2–2 |
| 4 | PDRM | 6 | 0 | 1 | 5 | 5 | 25 | −20 | 1 | | 2–5 | 0–5 | 1–6 | — |

Updated to match(es) played on 15 September 2018. Source: FAM FMLLP

== Statistics ==
=== Squad appearances ===
| No. | Pos. | Name | League | | FA Cup | | Malaysia Cup | | Total | | Discipline | |
| No. | Pos. | Name | Apps | Goals | Apps | Goals | Apps | Goals | Apps | Goals | Yellow card | Red card |
|---|---|---|---|---|---|---|---|---|---|---|---|---|
| 1 | GK | (Malaysia) Zarif Irfan | 4 | +7 | 0 | 0 | 7 | +3 | 11 | +10 | 1 | 0 |
| 2 | DF | (Malaysia) K. Reuben | 9 | 0 | 3 | 0 | 0(1) | 0 | 12(1) | 0 | 0 | 0 |
| 3 | DF | (Malaysia) (Ghana) Rodney Celvin | 14(2) | 0 | 6 | 1 | 5 | 0 | 25(2) | 1 | 6 | 0 |
| 4 | DF | (Malaysia) (England) Daniel Ting | 13(4) | 0 | 5(1) | 0 | 4(2) | 1 | 22(7) | 1 | 5 | 1 |
| 5 | MF | (Malaysia) Shahrul Azhar | 4(3) | 0 | 1(2) | 0 | 0 | 0 | 5(5) | 0 | 1 | 0 |
| 6 | MF | (Malaysia) Nik Shahrul Azim | 11 | 0 | 2 | 0 | 7(1) | 0 | 20(1) | 0 | 4 | 0 |
| 7 | MF | (Malaysia) K. Gurusamy | 9(6) | 0 | 2(1) | 1 | 6 | 0 | 17(7) | 1 | 4 | 0 |
| 8 | DF | (Australia) Zac Anderson | 20 | 1 | 1 | 0 | 8 | 0 | 29 | 1 | 2 | 0 |
| 9 | FW | (Malaysia) Jafri Firdaus Chew | 8(5) | 2 | 3(2) | 4(1) | 1 | 0 | 14(8) | 3 | 3 | 1 |
| 10 | FW | (Malaysia) Safee Sali | 9(10) | 5 | 2(2) | 2 | 1(3) | 1 | 12(15) | 8 | 6 | 0 |
| 11 | MF | (Malaysia) Nazrin Syamsul | 2(2) | 0 | 0 | 0 | 0 | 0 | 2(2) | 0 | 0 | 0 |
| 12 | DF | (Malaysia) Qayyum Marjoni | 14(2) | 1 | 0(1) | 0 | 5(1) | 0 | 19(4) | 1 | 2 | 0 |
| 14 | MF | (Malaysia) Khyril Muhymeen | 2(8) | 1 | 0(2) | 0 | 3(2) | 0 | 5(12) | 1 | 0 | 0 |
| 15 | DF | (Malaysia) P. Gunalan | 3(1) | 0 | 3 | 0 | 1(1) | 0 | 7(2) | 0 | 0 | 0 |
| 16 | MF | (Malaysia) Nurridzuan Abu Hassan | 1(2) | 1 | 0(2) | 0 | 4 | 0 | 5(4) | 2 | 0 | 0 |
| 17 | DF | (Malaysia) Azmizi Azmi | 10 | 0 | 5 | 0 | 0 | 0 | 15 | 0 | 1 | 0 |
| 18 | MF | (Malaysia) M. Sivakumar | 4(3) | 0 | 1(2) | 0 | 2 | 0 | 7(5) | 0 | 2 | 0 |
| 19 | MF | (Brazil) Bruno Matos | 9 | 7 | 2 | 0 | 4 | 4 | 15 | 11 | 1 | 0 |
| 20 | FW | (Malaysia) Faizat Ghazli | 0(2) | 0 | 0 | 0 | 2(3) | 1 | 2(5) | 1 | 0 | 0 |
| 21 | MF | (Colombia) Romel Morales | 20(1) | 3 | 6 | 2 | 8 | 3 | 34(1) | 8 | 2 | 1 |
| 22 | GK | (Malaysia) Tauffiq Ar Rasyid | 2 | +2 | 2 | –4 | 0 | 0 | 4 | –2 | 0 | 0 |
| 23 | MF | (Malaysia) Alif Haikal | 0(4) | 0 | 0(1) | 1 | 0(2) | 0 | 0(7) | 1 | 0 | 0 |
| 24 | DF | (Malaysia) Annas Rahmat | 0(1) | 0 | 0 | 0 | 2 | 0 | 2(1) | 0 | 0 | 0 |
| 25 | GK | (Malaysia) Shahril Saa'ri | 16 | +1 | 4 | +7 | 1 | 0 | 21 | +8 | 0 | 0 |
| 28 | DF | (Malaysia) Mahali Jasuli | 8(7) | 2 | 4(1) | 1 | 5(1) | 1 | 17(9) | 4 | 4 | 0 |
| 29 | FW | (Brazil) Rafael Ramazotti | 20(1) | 7 | 5(1) | 2 | 7 | 4 | 31(2) | 13 | 2 | 0 |
| 30 | MF | (Singapore) Faris Ramli | 20(1) | 6 | 5 | 1 | 3 | 2 | 28(1) | 9 | 0 | 0 |
Left club during season
| 19 | MF | (Argentina) Jonathan Acosta | 10(1) | 1 | 4 | 0 | 0 | 0 | 14(1) | 1 | 0 | 0 |

Statistics accurate as of 30 September 2018.

=== Clean sheets ===
| Rnk | No. | Player | League | FA Cup | League Cup | Total |
|---|---|---|---|---|---|---|
| 1 | 25 | (Malaysia) Shahril Saa'ri | 5 | 0 | 1 | 6 |
| 2 | 1 | (Malaysia) Zarif Irfan | 2 | 0 | 1 | 3 |
| 3 | 22 | (Malaysia) Tauffiq Ar Rasyid | 1 | 0 | 0 | 1 |
