= Alif Haikal Sabri =

Malaysian footballer

Alif Haikal
Personal information
- Full name: Muhammad Alif Haikal bin Mohd Sabri
- Date of birth: 19 October 1995 (age 31)
- Place of birth: Kuala Lumpur, Malaysia
- Height: 1.71 m (5 ft 7 1/2 in)
- Position: Midfielder

Team information
- Current team: ACeIO
- Number: 23

Youth career
- –2014: Harimau Muda C

Senior career*
Years	Team	Apps	(Gls)
2015–2023	PKNS	23	(4)
2023–2024	PIB		
2024–2026	AAK		
2026–	ACeIO		
- * Club domestic league appearances and goals

Muhammad Alif Haikal bin Mohd Sabri (born 19 October 1995) is a Malaysian professional footballer who plays as a midfielder for Malaysia A2 Amateur League club ACeIO.

== Career statistics ==
=== Club ===
As of 28 July 2018

Club	Season	League		Cup		League Cup		Asia		Total	
Club	Season	Apps	Goals	Apps	Goals	Apps	Goals	Apps	Goals	Apps	Goals
PKNS	2015	0	0	0	0	0	0	–	–	0	0
PKNS	2016	0	0	0	0	–	–	–	–	0	0
PKNS	2017	14	3	1	0	4	0	–	–	19	3
PKNS	2018	3	0	1	1	0	0	–	–	4	1
PKNS	Total	0	0	0	0	0	0	0	0	0	0
Career total		0	0	0	0	0	0	0	0	0	0
