= Afif Asyraf =

Malaysian footballer

Personal information
- Full name: Muhammad Afif Asyraf bin Mohamad Zabawi
- Date of birth: 7 June 1991 (age 35)
- Place of birth: Selangor, Malaysia
- Height: 1.63 m (5 ft 4 in)
- Position: Defender

Team information
- Current team: AAK
- Number: 12

Senior career*
Years	Team	Apps	(Gls)
2014	Kuantan		
2015–2021	UiTM FC	28	(0)
2022–2023	Perak	8	(0)
2024–	AAK Puncak Alam		
- * Club domestic league appearances and goals

Muhammad Afif Asyraf bin Mohamad Zabawi (born 7 June 1991) is a Malaysian professional footballer who plays as a defender for Malaysia A2 Amateur League club AAK Puncak Alam.
