= AAK-UNISEL =

Malaysian football club

- Full name: AAK-UNISEL Football Club
- Short name: AAK
- Founded: 2014; 12 years ago, as Ultimate FC; 2021; 5 years ago, as AAK Puncak Alam; 2026; 0 years ago, as AAK-UNISEL
- Ground: UPM Stadium; Kuala Selangor Stadium
- Capacity: 1,000; 10,000
- Owner: Jawahir Saliman; Universiti Selangor (UNISEL)
- Head coach: Rezal Zambery
- League: Malaysia A1 Semi-Pro League
- 2025–26: Semi-finals
- Website: AAK-UNISEL FC
Home colours	Away colours

AAK-UNISEL Football Club is a Malaysian football club based in Puncak Alam, Selangor. They currently play in the Malaysia A1 Semi-Pro League.

== History ==
Ultimate Football Club was founded in 2014 in Klang Valley, and has first participated in several local football competitions. In 2018, the club has won the AXA Klang Valley League after defeating Gombak FA 3–2, thus being eligible to compete in the Malaysia M3 League. In 2019, the club competed in the Malaysia FA Cup for the first time.

In 2023, Ultimate FC changed the name to Naga Ultimate Kuala Selangor (Naga UKS). However, Naga UKS finished last in the Malaysia M3 League and got relegated to the Malaysia A2 Amateur League. After relegation, they merged with the Selangor Champions League team AAK F.C. and changed the name to AAK Ultimate.

=== Formation and collaboration ===
AAK UNISEL FC was established in 2026 through a strategic merger between AAK Puncak Alam and Universiti Selangor (UNISEL), to bridge the gap between grassroots, collegiate sports, and the semi-professional circuit. For the 2026–27 season, the club focused on transitioning local and university players.

=== Crests and colours ===
2014–2022

2023

2024

== Players ==
=== Current squad ===
As of September 2026

Note: Flags indicate national team as defined under FIFA eligibility rules; some limited exceptions apply. Players may hold more than one non-FIFA nationality.

No.	Pos.	Nation	Player
5	MF	MAS	Adam Uwais Armi^{U22}
7	MF	MAS	Rafieq Al-Amzar
8	MF	KOR	Yoo Siwon
9	MF	NGR	ThankGod Michael Ogwuche
10	MF	MAS	Hadi Mohamad
11	MF	MAS	Dzulfahmi Abdul Hadi
12	DF	MAS	Afif Asyraf
13	DF	MAS	Syamel Idzham Shahriza
14	FW	MAS	Fa'es Hafize Fadzil
15	DF	MAS	Fairuz Zakaria
17	MF	MAS	Faris Kamardin
19	FW	MAS	Nabil Zakwan Zaki^{U22}
20	MF	MAS	Akhir Bahari
21	GK	MAS	Hanif Faizal
22	GK	MAS	Tauffiq Ar-Rasyid

No.	Pos.	Nation	Player
23	DF	MAS	Haziq Ridhwan
24	MF	MAS	Saiful Ridzuwan (captain)
25	GK	MAS	Ahmad Azeem Izhar^{U22}
30	DF	MAS	Iyad Hadi Hakimi^{U22}
31	MF	MAS	Rusydan Wahid Anuar
37	DF	MAS	Gerald Gadit
40	DF	NGR	Riliwan Okedara
44	DF	MAS	Fakrul Fareez
47	MF	MAS	Azziq Zahazani
55	DF	MAS	Danial Iman Ihtisyam^{U22}
70	DF	MAS	Zarif Syamil Zamani
73	FW	MAS	Zahir Syakil Zamani^{U22}
88	MF	MAS	Farish Daniel^{U22}
99	MF	MAS	Muzaimir Abdul Hadi

== Management ==
As of August 2026

Position	Name
Team manager	(Malaysia) Mohd Ikwaniata Taib
Head coach	(Malaysia) Rezal Zambery
Goalkeeper coach	(Malaysia) Azizon Abdul Kadir
Assistant goalkeeper coach	(Malaysia) Zamzuri Ismail
Fitness coach	(Malaysia) Mohamad Zahiri Moostafa
Physio	(Malaysia) Mohamad Zamri Pauzi
Team staff	(Malaysia) Mohd Hasmawi Hassan (Malaysia) Azmi Muslim
Team official	(Malaysia) Muhammad Aiman Ashraf
Team media	(Malaysia) Syahrul Azhar Rahim
Masseur	(Malaysia) Muhammad Addin Affandi
Kitman	(Malaysia) Muhammad Soufi Zainorrahim

== Kit manufacturer and shirt sponsor ==
Season	Manufacturer	Sponsor
2019	KicKa	Pulapol KL; Firhan Sports
2020	Panzer	Fit'z Ultimate
2022	Forfit	Forfit
2023	AL Sports	MBSB Bank
2024–25	AAK Sportswear	Secret Flavour

== Season by season record ==
Season	Division	Position	Malaysia Cup	Malaysian FA Cup	Malaysian Charity Shield	Top scorer (all competitions)
2019	M3 League	5th of 14	DNQ	Second round	–	(Nigeria) Chukwu Nnabuike (22)
2020^{1}	M3 League	Season abandoned	DNQ	DNQ	–	None
2021	M3 League		cancelled and declared null and void due to COVID-19 pandemic			
2022	M3 League	4th Group A	DNQ	Preliminary round	–	(Malaysia) Suhaili Rahman (5)
2023	M3 League	13th relegated	DNQ	DNQ	–	(Malaysia) Ahmad Solehin Rahman (3)
2024	A2 Amateur League	Quarter-finals	DNQ	DNQ	–	(Malaysia) Fa'es Hafize Mohd Fadzil (14)
2025–26	A2 Amateur League	Semi-finals	DNQ	DNQ	–	(Malaysia) Fa'es Hafize Mohd Fadzil (18)

Notes:'

^1 2020 season cancelled due to the COVID-19 pandemic, no promotion or league title was awarded.

== Honours ==
=== League ===
- Division 5/A3 League/AXA Klang Valley League

(gold) Winners (1): 2018
