= 2007 Merdeka Tournament =

2007 Pestabola Merdeka
Tournament details
- Host country: Malaysia
- Dates: 20–29 August
- Teams: 8
- Venue: 2 (in 2 host cities)

Final positions
- Champions: Malaysia U-23 (1st title)
- Runners-up: Myanmar

Tournament statistics
- Matches played: 15
- Goals scored: 44 (2.93 per match)

The 2007 Merdeka Tournament is the 39th editions of the Merdeka Tournament and was held on 20 to 29 August 2007.

== Groups ==
=== Group stage ===
Teams qualified for next phase

=== Group A ===
Team	Pts	Pld	W	D	L	GF	GA
Myanmar	9	3	3	0	0	4	1
Malaysia U-23	6	3	2	0	1	7	2
Lesotho	3	3	1	0	2	3	6
Laos	0	3	0	0	3	1	6

20 August
18:30

Myanmar	1–0	Lesotho
Soe Myat Min 49'

MBPJ Stadium

20 August
20:30

Malaysia U-23	2–0	Laos
Safee Sali 32'; Asaph D 53'

MBPJ Stadium

23 August
18:30

Myanmar	2–1	Malaysia U-23
Aung Myo Thant 42'; Yan Paing 50'		Zaquan Adha 70'

MBPJ Stadium

23 August
20:30

Lesotho	3–1	Laos
Potse Refiloe 3'; Maipato Tefo 6'; Moleko Katleho 23'		Visay Phaphouvanin 26'

MBPJ Stadium

25 August
18:30

Malaysia U-23	4–0	Lesotho
Shukor Adan 44'; Khyril Muhymeen 47'; Zaquan Adha 50'; Norshahrul Idlan 59'

MBPJ Stadium

25 August
20:30

Myanmar	1–0	Laos
Yan Paing 30'

MBPJ Stadium

=== Group B ===
Team	Pts	Pld	W	D	L	GF	GA
Singapore U-23	9	3	3	0	0	7	3
Zimbabwe	6	3	2	0	1	6	6
Indonesia U-23	3	3	1	0	2	2	2
Bangladesh B	0	3	0	0	3	2	5

21 August
18:30

Singapore U-23	4–2	Zimbabwe
Agu Casmir 5'; Khairul Amri 22'; Ridhuan Muhammad 30'; Fazrul Nawaz 34'		Johannes Ngodzo 48'; Lionel Mtizwa 60'

Shah Alam Stadium

21 August
20:30

Indonesia U-23	1–0	Bangladesh B
Cornelius Geddy 27'

Shah Alam Stadium

23 August
18:30

Singapore U-23	2–1	Bangladesh B
Ridhuan Muhammad 43'; Fazrul Nawaz 45'		Zumratul Hossain Mithu 89'

Shah Alam Stadium

23 August
20:30

Indonesia U-23	1–2	Zimbabwe
Cornelius Geddy 45'		Mutshumaveli Moyo 26'; Philip Marufu 57'

Shah Alam Stadium

25 August
18:30

Indonesia U-23	0–2	Singapore U-23
		Ridhuan Muhammad 7'; Agu Casmir 85'

Shah Alam Stadium

25 August
20:30

Bangladesh B	1–2	Zimbabwe
Saifur Rahman Moni 88'		Lionel Mtizwa 38'; Johannes Ngodzo 58'

Shah Alam Stadium

== Knockout stage ==
Semi-finals
27 August - MBPJ
Myanmar	3
Zimbabwe	1
27 August - MBPJ
Singapore U-23	1
Malaysia U-23	3

Final
29 August - Shah Alam
Myanmar	1
Malaysia U-23	3

=== Semi finals ===
27 August
18:30

Myanmar	3–1	Zimbabwe
Yan Paing 32', 57'; Yazar Win Thein 88'

MBPJ Stadium

27 August
20:30

Malaysia U-23	3–1	Singapore U-23
Khyril Muhymeen 14'; Safee Sali 18', 76'		Agu Casmir 48'

MBPJ Stadium

=== Finals ===
29 August
20:30

Myanmar	1–3	Malaysia U-23
Tun Tun Win 73'		Zaquan Adha 12'; Khin Maung Lwin 56' (o.g.); Safee Sali 60'

Shah Alam Stadium

== Award ==
2007 Merdeka Tournament winner

Malaysia U-23
1st title
