= Kevin Osei =

French footballer (born 1991)

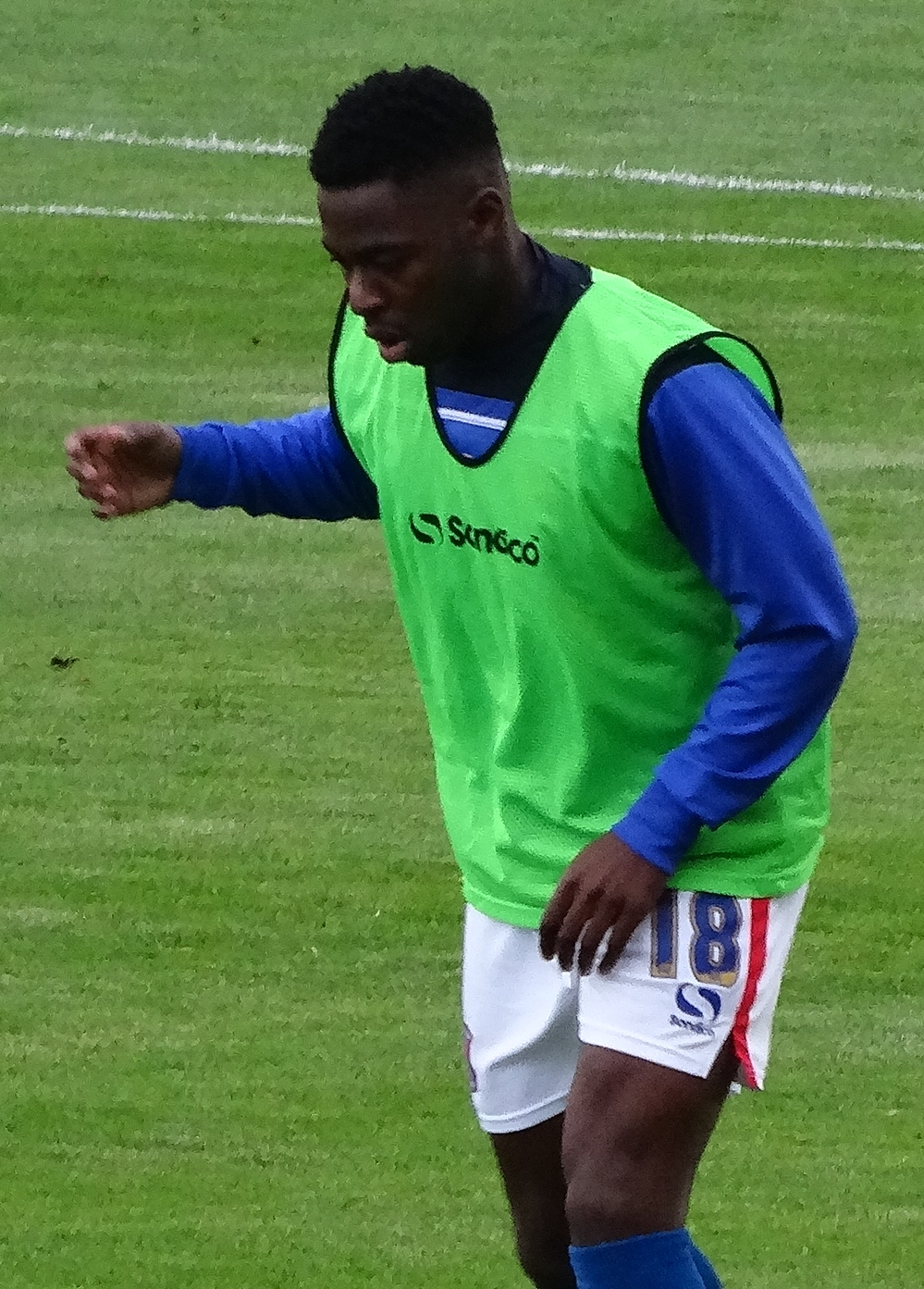
- Osei warming up for Carlisle United in 2015

Personal information
- Date of birth: 26 March 1991 (age 35)
- Place of birth: Marseille, France
- Height: 1.74 m (5 ft 8 1/2 in)
- Position: Midfielder

Team information
- Current team: AUBAGNE F.C.

Youth career
- 1999–2003: Olympique Saint Maximinois
- 2003–2009: Marseille

Senior career*
Years	Team	Apps	(Gls)
2009–2014	Marseille	1	(0)
2011–2012	→ Aviron Bayonnais (loan)	3	(0)
2012–2014	Marseille II	47	(8)
2014–2015	Beveren	0	(0)
2015	Carlisle United	9	(1)
2016–2017	Spartak Pleven	21	(1)
2017–2018	Lokomotiv GO	21	(1)
2019	Perlis F.A.		
2019–2020	Aubagne	7	(2)
2020–	UKM F.C.		
- * Club domestic league appearances and goals as of 09:31, 10 November 2020 (UTC)

Kevin Osei (born 26 March 1991) is a French professional footballer who plays as a midfielder for French National 2 club Aubagne FC

== Club career ==
=== Early career ===
Kevin joined Marseille when he was 12 from Olympique Saint Maximinois. He went through their youth system, winning many youth trophies, including "Championnat National des 16 ans" (Under 16 National Championship), after reaching with his team in 2008 the Under 16 final stage for the first time in Marseille's history. He went on to join Marseille's first team in 2009, after signing an "Elite" contract (2 years as a trainee and 3 years as a professional). His first professional match with Marseille was against AEL Limassol in the UEFA Europa League

=== Beveren ===
Osei signed a six-month contract with Belgian Jupiler Pro League club Beveren in January 2015.

=== Carlisle United ===
Osei penned a six-month deal with the option to extend on 28 July 2015 with English League Two club Carlisle United following a successful trial spell. On 23 December Osei was released by the club by mutual consent.

=== Spartak Pleven ===
On 18 October 2016, Osei joined Bulgarian Second League club Spartak Pleven. He was released at the end of the season.

=== Lokomotiv GO ===
On 15 September 2017, Osei joined another Second League club, Lokomotiv Gorna Oryahovitsa. He left the club at the end of the 2017–18 season.

=== Perlis FA ===
In January 2019 it was announced that Osei had signed a one-year contract with Perlis F.A. in the Malaysia Premier League, however in February 2019 Perlis were disqualified from the tournament.

=== Aubagne ===
In October 2019, Osei signed for French Championnat National 3 side Aubagne FC.

=== UKM ===
In February 2020, Osei returned to Malaysia, signing for UKM F.C.

== International career ==
Osei has expressed his desire to play for Ghana. He was meant to take part in the 2011 African Youth Championship, but because of delays in obtaining his Ghanaian passport, he wasn't eligible to play for the Ghana U20 national team. He continues to follow Ghanaian national teams in every competition they are engaged in.
