= Shahrul Azhar Ture =

Malaysian footballer

Personal information
- Full name: Shahrul Azhar bin Ture
- Date of birth: 15 September 1985 (age 41)
- Place of birth: Sabah, Malaysia
- Height: 1.65 m (5 ft 5 in)
- Position: Midfielder

Team information
- Current team: PKNS
- Number: 5

Senior career*
Years	Team	Apps	(Gls)
2006–2013	Sabah	68	(16)
2014–	PKNS	55	(3)

International career^{‡}
2001–2003	Malaysia U-21	10	(0)
- * Club domestic league appearances and goals as of February 8, 2018 ‡ National team caps and goals as of January 24, 2017

Shahrul Azhar bin Ture (born 15 September 1985) is a Malaysian footballer who plays as a midfielder for the Malaysia Super League club PKNS.

== Career statistics ==
As of 27 June 2018

=== Club ===
Club	Season	League		Cup		League Cup		Continental		Total	
Club	Season	Apps	Goals	Apps	Goals	Apps	Goals	Apps	Goals	Apps	Goals
PKNS	2017	15	1	1	0	4	0	–		20	1
PKNS	2018	7	0	3	0	0	0	–		10	0
PKNS	Total	0	0	0	0	0	0	0	0	0	0
Career total		0	0	0	0	0	0	0	0	0	0
