= Safee Sali =

Malaysian footballer

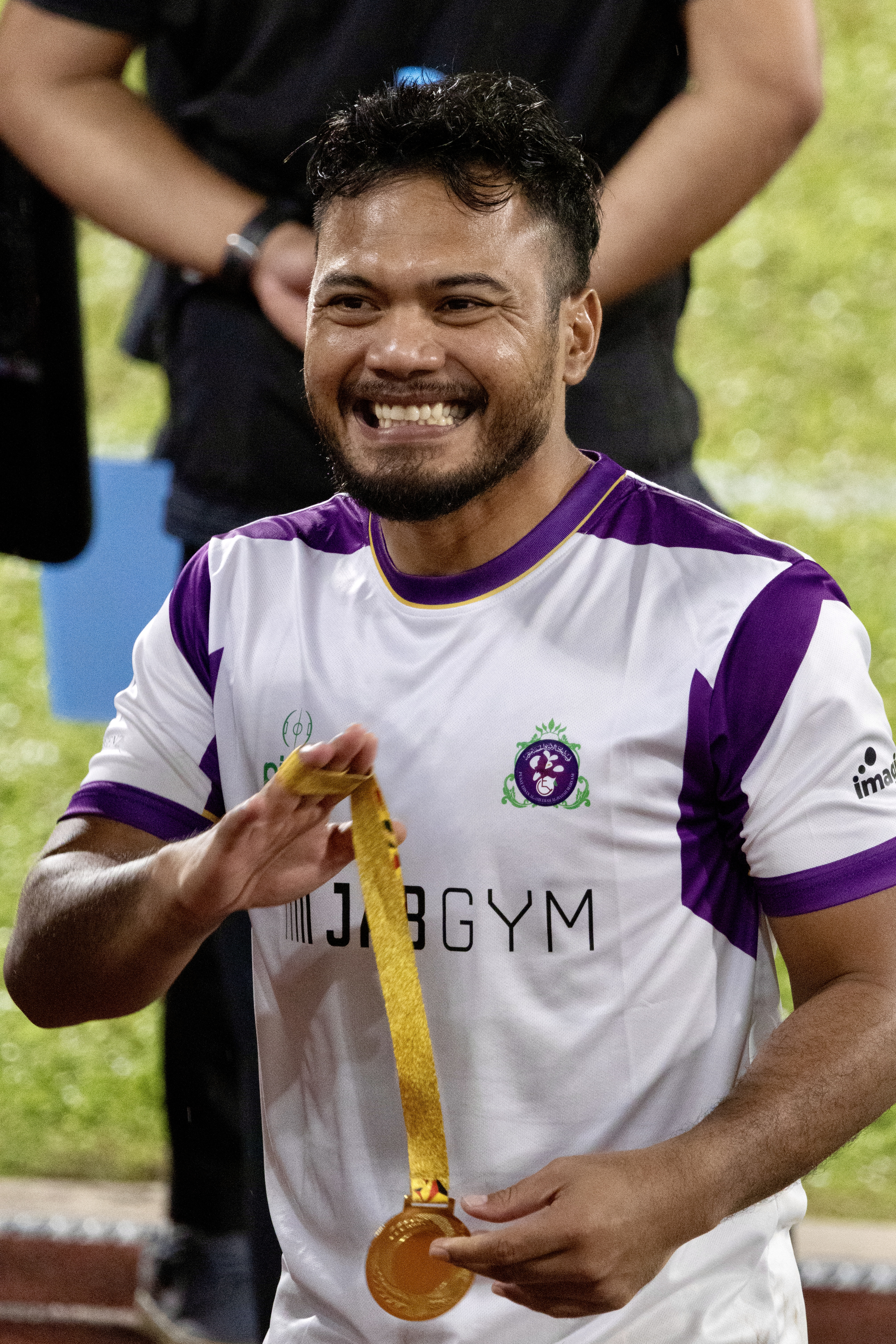
- Safee in 2024

Personal information
- Full name: Mohd Safee bin Mohd Sali
- Date of birth: 29 January 1984 (age 42)
- Place of birth: Kajang, Selangor, Malaysia
- Height: 1.72 m (5 ft 7 1/2 in)
- Position: Forward

Senior career*
| Years | Team | Apps | (Gls) |
| 2003–2005 | Kuala Lumpur FA | ? | (20) |
| 2003 | → Telekom Melaka (loan) | ? | (1) |
| 2005–2006 | Sarawak FA | 28 | (19) |
| 2006–2011 | Selangor | ? | (36) |
| 2011–2013 | Pelita Jaya | 42 | (27) |
| 2013 | → Johor Darul Ta'zim (loan) | 16 | (2) |
| 2014–2017 | Johor Darul Ta'zim | 32 | (4) |
| 2017–2018 | PKNS | 33 | (9) |
| 2019 | Perlis | 3 | (0) |
| 2019–2020 | Petaling Jaya City | 20 | (4) |
| 2021–2022 | Kuala Lumpur City | 13 | (1) |

International career^{‡}
| 2004–2010 | Malaysia U23 | 26 | (14) |
| 2006–2017 | Malaysia | 76 | (23) |
| 2008–2013 | Malaysia XI | 8 | (2) |
Medal record
Men's football
Representing Malaysia
Asean Football Championship
| Winner | 2010 | Team |
| Runner-up | 2014 | Team |
- * Club domestic league appearances and goals as of 24 June 2022 ‡ National team caps and goals as of 24 May 2017

Mohd Safee bin Mohd Sali (born 29 January 1984) is a Malaysian former footballer who played as forward.

He played for Kuala Lumpur FA, Telekom Melaka, Sarawak, Selangor, Johor Darul Ta'zim, PKNS, Perlis and Petaling Jaya City before returning to Kuala Lumpur. In 2011, Safee became the first Malaysian to play in the Indonesia Super League with Pelita Jaya. A Malaysian international between 2006 and 2017, Safee won the 2010 AFF Championship and scored a total of nine goals in four consecutive editions of the tournament.

On 21 February 2023, Safee announced his retirement from professional football at the age of 39. He had 76 caps and 23 goals with the Malaysia national football team on the international stage and scored a total of 180 goals (153 goals with Malaysian League club, 27 goals with Indonesian League club) in club football.

== Club career ==
=== Kuala Lumpur FA ===
Safee was brought to Kuala Lumpur FA by coach Igor Novak. He scored his first hat-trick in a MPL 2 match against Perak TKN, which ended 6–2. He netted 11 goals in his first season to become the second top local goalscorer behind Azman Adnan. However, during the 2004 season, he only managed to score 2 league goals. In his last season with Kuala Lumpur, he scored 7 league goals, 3 goals in the 2005 Malaysia FA Cup, where Kuala Lumpur reached the semi-finals, as well as 1 goal in the 2005 Malaysia Cup.

=== Telekom Melaka ===
Safee was loaned to Telekom Melaka for the 2003 Malaysia Cup after Kuala Lumpur failed to qualify for the cup competition. He scored one goal in the competition against Sarawak in their final group match. He returned to Kuala Lumpur following TMFC's failure to qualify for the knockout round.

=== Sarawak FA ===
Safee later joined Sarawak FA. He became the top local goalscorer with 10 goals in the league's competition. At the end of the season, he scored a total of 19 goals in all competitions, making him the top scorer for Sarawak during the 2005/06 season.

=== Selangor FA ===
In 2006/2007 season, Safee joined Selangor FA. He was given the number 10 jersey which was once worn by legendary Selangor FA and Malaysian national team player, the late Mokhtar Dahari. With Selangor, Safee impressed K. Devan by bringing the team both to the FA Cup and Malaysia Cup final. However, Selangor lost to Kedah FA in both finals with the same score of 3–2. He scored a total of 11 goals in his first season with Selangor.

On his second season with Selangor, he scored 11 goals in 10 matches, but he had an injury that made him missed half of the 2007/08 season. He returned to be the second top scorer on the 2010 Season. He also scored the winning goal for Selangor in a 2–1 win against Negeri Sembilan FA at the 2010 Malaysia Charity Shield.

After the 2010 AFF Suzuki Cup and his superb performance at the early stages in the 2011 Super League Malaysia season, Safee agreed to join the Indonesian Super League team, Pelita Jaya to gain more experience. Safee's last game with Selangor was a 1–1 draw against Kuala Lumpur FA. This was Safee's last game before his departure to Karawang, Indonesia to join Pelita Jaya.

=== Pelita Jaya ===
On 5 February 2011, Safee officially transferred to the Indonesian Super League team, Pelita Jaya on a US$30,000 transfer fee and his salary reached US$10,000 or RM 30,360. . Safee signed a one-year contract with Pelita Jaya. This transfer made Safee the first Malaysian player to play in the Indonesian Super League. Safee originally was given the number 10 shirt. But due to a registration problem, he chose the number 55 instead of his original number. Safee made his league debut against Sriwijaya. Safee scored 7 goals in 13 appearances in his first season with Pelita.

On 12 October 2011, Safee was announced as the captain of Pelita Jaya for the upcoming 2011–12 Indonesia Super League season and changed his jersey number to 10 instead. On 24 March 2012, Safee managed to score four goals against Gresik United. Safee ended the season with 20 league goals.

==== Cardiff City trial ====
In 2011, Safee was offered a two-week trial with Football League Championship club, Cardiff City.

=== Arema Cronus ===
In 2013 season, Safee transferred to Arema Cronus.

=== Johor Darul Takzim ===
In 2013, Safee returned to Malaysia to join Johor Darul Takzim. He made his debut and scored two goals in the pre-season match against Melaka United. In 2015, Safee was selected to start in the 2015 AFC Cup Final in a 1–0 victory against Istiklol at Pamir Stadium.

=== PKNS ===
Safee signed with PKNS FC in 2017 for Malaysia Super League season. He spent two seasons with the team and made 33 league appearances by scoring 9 goals. PKNS FC had finished in third place of the table for 2018 Malaysia Super league season.

=== Perlis and PJ City ===
In 2019, Safee briefly played for Perlis. Malaysian Football League (MFL) canceled Perlis participation in the league due to their financial planning were insufficient to manage the team for competition in the M-League. He later signed with PJ City on 20 February 2019.

=== Kuala Lumpur City ===
Safee signed with Kuala Lumpur City on 24 December 2020. He made his debut in a 1–0 defeat against Penang on 6 March 2021. In 2021 Malaysia Cup, Safee won his first ever Malaysia Cup title in 20 years of his career after defeating Johor Darul Ta'zim 2–0 in the final. In 2022, Safee set a record as the first Malaysian footballer to play in two AFC Cup finals as he come in as substitutes in a 3–0 defeat against Al Seeb.

== International career ==
=== Youth team ===
Safee started representing Malaysia Under-23 during the 2004 Olympic Games qualifiers. He played all the qualification matches but mostly played as the substitute. He was then selected to represent Malaysia Under-23 at the 2005 Pre-South East Asian Games in Thailand under the then-coach Bertalan Bicskei. He managed to score only one goal in the tournament against the Philippines Under-23. He however did not make it into 2005 South East Asian Games squad that won the bronze medal. After the 2005 South East Asian Games, Safee was given a chance by coach Norizan Bakar to represent the Under-23 side for the 2006 Doha Asian Games. He again failed to make it into the squad.

After the national Under-23 sides failure in the 2006 Asian Games, Safee was selected as the main striker by coach B. Sathianathan. Together with striking partner Mohd Zaquan Adha Abdul Radzak, they managed to win the 2007 Merdeka Tournament after defeating Myanmar 3–1 in the final and becoming the top scorer with 4 goals. He then was chosen to represent the country in the 2007 South East Asian Games in Thailand. Safee managed to score 2 goals in the tournament but the Under-23 national team failed to advance into the semifinal after a draw against rivals the Singapore.

For 2008, Safee was chosen as the main striker in the 2008 Malaysia Intercontinental Cup. He managed to score all Malaysia's 3 goals in Malaysia's 1–3 defeat to the Republic of Ireland, 1–0 win against the Iraq and an impressive 1–1 draw against the Nigeria. The match against Nigeria was Safee's last game with Malaysia national under-23 team.

In 2010, Safee received called up for the Asian Games squad. He played three matches in Eximbank Cup in Vietnam. He did not chosen as the three senior members for the final squad to the Asian Games.

=== Senior team ===
After a season with Sarawak in the Malaysia Premier League, Safee managed to make it into the national team. He was given his first senior caps against New Zealand on 19 February 2006. He then scored his first international goal on his second cap against New Zealand.

He then became the part of the national football team preparing for the 2007 AFC Asian Cup. He was then chosen into the squad of Malaysia 2007 Asian Cup. He only made his first appearance in the Asian Cup in the third group match against Iran where Malaysia lost 0–2.

For the 2008 Merdeka Tournament, Safee scored another similar style of goal that was scored earlier during the 2008 Sultan of selangor Cup against the Nepal. He became the top scorer of the tournament with 5 goals despite Malaysia losing 6–5 through penalty kicks against Vietnam in the final.

In November 2010, Safee was called up to the Malaysia national squad by coach K. Rajagopal for the 2010 AFF Suzuki Cup. Safee scored twice against Vietnam to secure a 2–0 win in the first leg in the semi-finals. Safee again scored another two goals in the first leg of the finals to secure a 3–0 win against Indonesia. On the second leg of the Final, Safee scored another goal to earn 5 goals, thus becoming the tournament's top goal scorer. Malaysia won the 2010 AFF Suzuki Cup 2010 title for the first time in their history.

On 28 November 2012, Safee netted in his third consecutive AFF Championship tournament, scoring the second goal in Malaysia's 4–1 win over Laos in their second group match. On 29 November 2014, Safee netted in his fourth consecutive AFF Championship tournament, scoring the first goal in Malaysia's 3–1 win over Singapore in their third group match.

=== Malaysia XI ===
Safee also represented in the Malaysia XI squad against Arsenal and Liverpool at the Shah Alam Stadium on 29 July 2008. He was one of the impressive Malaysian players on the match. The Malaysia XI eventually lost.

On 16 July 2011, Safee was included in the match against Liverpool in which Malaysia XI lost 3–6. He came on as a substitute and scored 2 goals.

== Attributes ==
Safee previously wore the jersey No. 10, which was once worn by Selangor FA and Malaysian national team player, the late Mokhtar Dahari. He is a member of the Malaysia national football team. His playing style, pace, physique and shooting techniques recently made him a regular first team member for the national team.

== Social media controversy ==
Safee gained notoriety on social media after lashing out at fans for criticising his poor performances for the Malaysian national team in the 2014 AFF Suzuki Cup. After a 3–2 loss to Thailand in the group stage of the tournament, he responded to negative comments on Instagram by saying in Malay: "Those commenting negatively here, have you played at the international level? If not, you'd better shut up...Don't put down the efforts of those fighting for the country's honour...IF YOU SHAME TO SUPPORT HARIMAU MALAYA BETTER CHANGE TO ANOTHER FLAG" [sic].

Malaysia succeeded in making it to the final anyway, after overturning a 2–1 semi-final first leg deficit to win 5–3 on aggregate against Vietnam in the second leg. Safee was rested for the second leg, reportedly due to injury. Following the victory over Vietnam, he posted an Instagram photo of himself celebrating, with the caption (translated): "To the fans who swapped flags after being told off last time, don't hide your faces behind pillows ok..just wipe them with tissues". One of the photo's hashtags said "#amikkau", which means "take that" in Malay. This outraged Malaysian fans further, and Safee was booed by home supporters during the final game against Thailand.

== Commercial endorsements ==
Safee is under sponsorship with American sports-brand, Nike, after previously being the face of Adidas for South East Asia. Safee was given his own Mercurial Football Boot with his name on it. It was given exclusively by Nike.

== Career statistics ==
=== Club ===
As of match played 22 October 2022

Appearances and goals by club, season and competition
| Club | Season | League | | | Cup | | League Cup | | Continental | | Other | | Total | |
| Club | Season | Division | Apps | Goals | Apps | Goals | Apps | Goals | Apps | Goals | Apps | Goals | Apps | Goals |
|---|---|---|---|---|---|---|---|---|---|---|---|---|---|---|
| Kuala Lumpur | 2003 | Premier League 2 | | 11 | | 0 | – | | – | | – | | | 11 |
| Kuala Lumpur | 2004 | Malaysia Premier League | | 2 | | 0 | | 0 | – | | – | | | 2 |
| Kuala Lumpur | 2005–06 | Malaysia Premier League | | 7 | | 3 | | 1 | – | | – | | | 11 |
| Kuala Lumpur | Total | | | 20 | | 3 | | 1 | – | | – | | | 24 |
| Telekom Melaka (loan) | 2003 | Premier League 1 | – | | – | | | 1 | – | | – | | | 1 |
| Telekom Melaka (loan) | Total | | – | | – | | | 1 | – | | – | | | 1 |
| Sarawak | 2005–06 | Malaysia Premier League | | 10 | | 6 | | 3 | – | | – | | | 19 |
| Sarawak | Total | | | 10 | | 6 | | 3 | – | | – | | | 19 |
| Selangor FA | 2006-07 | Malaysia Super League | | 0 | | 2 | | 1 | – | | – | | | 3 |
| Selangor FA | 2007-08 | Malaysia Super League | | 11 | | 9 | | 6 | – | | – | | | 26 |
| Selangor FA | 2009 | Malaysia Super League | | 12 | | 1 | | 5 | – | | – | | | 18 |
| Selangor FA | 2010 | Malaysia Super League | | 12 | | 2 | | 3 | 5 | 3 | – | | | 20 |
| Selangor FA | 2011 | Malaysia Super League | 3 | 1 | – | | – | | – | | – | | 3 | 1 |
| Selangor FA | Total | | | 36 | | 14 | | 15 | 5 | 3 | – | | | 68 |
| Pelita Jaya | 2010–2011 | Indonesia Super League | 13 | 7 | – | | – | | – | | – | | 13 | 7 |
| Pelita Jaya | 2011–2012 | Indonesia Super League | 29 | 20 | – | | – | | – | | – | | 29 | 20 |
| Pelita Jaya | Total | | 42 | 27 | – | | – | | – | | – | | 42 | 27 |
| Johor Darul Ta'zim (loan) | 2013 | Malaysia Super League | 16 | 2 | 5 | 1 | 6 | 3 | – | | – | | 27 | 6 |
| Johor Darul Ta'zim (loan) | Total | | 16 | 2 | 5 | 1 | 6 | 3 | – | | – | | 27 | 6 |
| Johor Darul Ta'zim | 2014 | Malaysia Super League | 9 | 2 | 3 | 1 | 1 | 0 | – | | – | | 13 | 3 |
| Johor Darul Ta'zim | 2015 | Malaysia Super League | 15 | 1 | 1 | 0 | 8 | 3 | 10 | 4 | – | | 34 | 8 |
| Johor Darul Ta'zim | 2016 | Malaysia Super League | 8 | 1 | 3 | 0 | 5 | 2 | 7 | 3 | – | | 23 | 6 |
| Johor Darul Ta'zim | Total | | 32 | 4 | 7 | 1 | 14 | 5 | 17 | 7 | – | | 70 | 17 |
| PKNS | 2017 | Malaysia Super League | 14 | 4 | 1 | 0 | 1 | 0 | – | | – | | 16 | 4 |
| PKNS | 2018 | Malaysia Super League | 19 | 5 | 4 | 2 | 4 | 1 | – | | – | | 27 | 8 |
| PKNS | Total | | 33 | 9 | 5 | 2 | 5 | 1 | – | | – | | 43 | 12 |
| Perlis | 2019 | Malaysia Premier League | 3 | 0 | – | | – | | – | | – | | 3 | 0 |
| Perlis | Total | | 3 | 0 | – | | – | | – | | – | | 3 | 0 |
| Petaling Jaya City | 2019 | Malaysia Super League | 14 | 3 | 2 | 1 | 6 | 0 | – | | – | | 22 | 4 |
| Petaling Jaya City | 2020 | Malaysia Super League | 6 | 1 | – | | 1 | 0 | – | | – | | 7 | 1 |
| Petaling Jaya City | Total | | 20 | 4 | 2 | 1 | 1 | 0 | – | | – | | 29 | 5 |
| Kuala Lumpur City | 2021 | Malaysia Super League | 11 | 1 | – | | 3 | 0 | – | | – | | 14 | 1 |
| Kuala Lumpur City | 2022 | Malaysia Super League | 2 | 0 | 1 | 0 | 0 | 0 | 2 | 0 | 0 | 0 | 5 | 0 |
| Kuala Lumpur City | Total | | 13 | 1 | 1 | 0 | 3 | 0 | 2 | 0 | 0 | 0 | - | 180 |

=== International Appearances ===
As of 22 March 2017.

Malaysia national team
| Year | Apps | Goals |
|---|---|---|
| 2006 | 4 | 1 |
| 2007 | 4 | 0 |
| 2008 | 11 | 7 |
| 2009 | 1 | 0 |
| 2010 | 6 | 5 |
| 2011 | 8 | 5 |
| 2012 | 16 | 3 |
| 2013 | 3 | 0 |
| 2014 | 13 | 1 |
| 2015 | 6 | 1 |
| 2016 | 3 | 0 |
| 2017 | 1 | 0 |
| Total | 76 | 23 |

== International goals ==
Scores and results list Malaysia's goal tally first.

| # | Date | Venue | Opponent | Score | Result | Competition |
|---|---|---|---|---|---|---|
| 1. | 23 February 2006 | North Harbour Stadium, Auckland, New Zealand | New Zealand | 1–1 | 1–2 | Friendly |
| 2. | 10 October 2008 | Bukit Jalil National Stadium, Kuala Lumpur, Malaysia | Pakistan | 1–0 | 4–1 | Friendly |
| 3. | 15 October 2008 | Petaling Jaya Stadium, Petaling Jaya, Malaysia | Nepal | 2–0 | 4–0 | 2008 Pestabola Merdeka |
| 4. | 15 October 2008 | Petaling Jaya Stadium, Petaling Jaya, Malaysia | Nepal | 3–0 | 4–0 | 2008 Pestabola Merdeka |
| 5. | 20 October 2008 | Bukit Jalil National Stadium, Kuala Lumpur, Malaysia | Afghanistan | 5–0 | 6–0 | 2008 Pestabola Merdeka |
| 6. | 23 October 2008 | Bukit Jalil National Stadium, Kuala Lumpur, Malaysia | Myanmar | 2–0 | 4–0 | 2008 Pestabola Merdeka |
| 7. | 6 December 2008 | Surakul Stadium, Phuket, Thailand | Laos | 1–0 | 3–0 | 2008 AFF Suzuki Cup |
| 8. | 6 December 2008 | Surakul Stadium, Phuket, Thailand | Laos | 3–0 | 3–0 | 2008 AFF Suzuki Cup |
| 9. | 15 December 2010 | Bukit Jalil National Stadium, Kuala Lumpur, Malaysia | Vietnam | 1–0 | 2–0 | 2010 AFF Suzuki Cup |
| 10. | 15 December 2010 | Bukit Jalil National Stadium, Kuala Lumpur, Malaysia | Vietnam | 2–0 | 2–0 | 2010 AFF Suzuki Cup |
| 11. | 26 December 2010 | Bukit Jalil National Stadium, Kuala Lumpur, Malaysia | Indonesia | 1–0 | 3–0 | 2010 AFF Suzuki Cup |
| 12. | 26 December 2010 | Bukit Jalil National Stadium, Kuala Lumpur, Malaysia | Indonesia | 3–0 | 3–0 | 2010 AFF Suzuki Cup |
| 13. | 29 December 2010 | Gelora Bung Karno Stadium, Jakarta, Indonesia | Indonesia | 1–0 | 1–2 | 2010 AFF Suzuki Cup |
| 14. | 23 July 2011 | Jalan Besar Stadium, Jalan Besar, Singapore | Singapore | 1–0 | 3–5 | 2014 FIFA World Cup qualification |
| 15. | 23 July 2011 | Jalan Besar Stadium, Jalan Besar, Singapore | Singapore | 3–4 | 3–5 | 2014 FIFA World Cup qualification |
| 16. | 28 July 2011 | Bukit Jalil National Stadium, Kuala Lumpur, Malaysia | Singapore | 1–0 | 1–1 | 2014 FIFA World Cup qualification |
| 17. | 16 November 2011 | Salt Lake Stadium, Kolkata, India | India | 1–1 | 2–3 | Friendly |
| 18. | 16 November 2011 | Salt Lake Stadium, Kolkata, India | India | 2–3 | 2–3 | Friendly |
| 19. | 16 October 2012 | Mong Kok Stadium, Mong Kok, Hong Kong | Hong Kong | 1–0 | 3–0 | Friendly |
| 20. | 14 November 2012 | Bukit Jalil National Stadium, Kuala Lumpur, Malaysia | Hong Kong | 1–0 | 1–1 | Friendly |
| 21. | 28 November 2012 | Bukit Jalil National Stadium, Kuala Lumpur, Malaysia | Laos | 2–1 | 4–1 | 2012 AFF Suzuki Cup |
| 22. | 29 November 2014 | National Stadium, Kallang, Singapore | Singapore | 1–0 | 3–1 | 2014 AFF Suzuki Cup |
| 23. | 11 June 2015 | Bukit Jalil National Stadium, Kuala Lumpur, Malaysia | Timor-Leste | 1–0 | 1–1 | 2018 FIFA World Cup qualification |

== Radiography ==
=== Radio ===
| Year | Title | Station |
|---|---|---|
| 12 August 2023 – present | Super Safee ERA | Era |

== Honours ==
=== Club ===
Selangor

- Malaysian Charity Shield : 2009, 2010
- Malaysian Super League : 2009, 2010
- Malaysian FA Cup : 2009

Pelita Jaya FC

- Indonesian Inter Island Cup : 2011 third place

Johor Darul Ta'zim

- Malaysia Super League: 2014, 2015, 2016
- Malaysian Charity Shield: 2015, 2016
- Malaysia FA Cup: 2016
- AFC Cup: 2015

Kuala Lumpur City

- Malaysia Cup : 2021
- AFC Cup : 2022 runner up

=== International ===
Malaysia

- Pestabola Merdeka : 2008 runner up
- AFF Championship : 2010 winner
- AFF Championship : 2014 runner up

Malaysia U-23

- Pestabola Merdeka : 2007 winner

=== Individual ===
- Pestabola Merdeka Top Scorer : 2007, 2008
- AFF Championship Top Scorer : 2010
- Goal.com readers' Asian Best XI: 2011
- AFF Championship All-time XI: 2021
