= Bruno Matos =

Brazilian footballer (born 1990)

Personal information
- Full name: Bruno Oliveira de Matos
- Date of birth: 5 June 1990 (age 36)
- Place of birth: Barra, Brazil
- Height: 1.80 m (5 ft 11 in)
- Positions: Attacking midfielder; winger

Team information
- Current team: Dhaka Abahani
- Number: 9

Senior career*
Years	Team	Apps	(Gls)
2009–2010	XV de Piracicaba	25	(1)
2010–2014	Palmeiras	1	(0)
2011	→ Oeste (loan)	7	(1)
2012	→ Noroeste (loan)	5	(0)
2012	→ Atlético Sorocaba (loan)	20	(2)
2013	→ Juazeiro (loan)	15	(2)
2013	→ ASA (loan)	7	(0)
2013–2014	→ Vitória da Conquista (loan)	23	(9)
2014	→ Nacional-MG (loan)	1	(0)
2014	→ Juazeirense (loan)	5	(1)
2014–2015	Novi Pazar	22	(4)
2015–2016	Red Star Belgrade	5	(1)
2016	→ Novi Pazar (loan)	11	(1)
2016–2017	Sanat Naft Abadan	16	(0)
2017–2018	Manama	19	(3)
2018	Juazeirense	13	(2)
2018	PKNS	8	(7)
2019	Persija Jakarta	7	(3)
2019–2020	Bhayangkara	17	(9)
2020–2021	Madura United	3	(1)
2021	Viettel	5	(1)
2022	Barito Putera	15	(5)
2023	Al-Jeel	0	(0)
2023	Dhaka Abahani	0	(0)
2024	Juazeirense	15	(1)
2025	Sampaio Corrêa	4	(1)
2025–	Dhaka Abahani	2	(0)
- * Club domestic league appearances and goals as of 28 November 2025

Bruno Oliveira de Matos (born 5 June 1990) is a Brazilian professional footballer who plays as an attacking midfielder or winger for Bangladesh Premier League club Dhaka Abahani.

== Career ==
=== Brazil ===
Born in Barra, in the Brazilian state of Bahia, Bruno played with XV de Piracicaba in the 2009–10 season from where he was brought in summer 2010 by Luis Felipe Scolari to Palmeiras and signed a 4-year contract with the club. He debuted in the 2010 Campeonato Brasileiro Série A however as Scolari left Palmeiras, Bruno saw Scolari's successors making other choices so he struggled for a spot in the first team. In the second year, he opted to accept a loan to Oeste during 2011. On loan, he played for a number of clubs during 2012. In 2013 Bruno signed on loan with Juazeiro and his consistent performances with the club in the Campeonato Baiano earned him a move on loan in May to ASA playing in the Campeonato Brasileiro Série B.

He started 2014 by playing with Nacional-MG on loan from Palmeiras in the Campeonato Mineiro but by mid February he moved to Campeonato Baiano side Juazeirense on loan.

=== Serbia ===
In August 2014, he made his first move abroad, and on 28 August, he signed a 2-year contract with Serbian club FK Novi Pazar. His regular performances with Novi Pazar in the 2014–15 Serbian SuperLiga earned him a move at the end of the season to Serbian giants Red Star Belgrade. He made 5 appearances and scored once in the league for Red Star, but that ended up not being enough, and in order to get more time on the pitch, he was loaned back to his former club, Novi Pazar, during the second half of the season. After finishing the loan, he was released by Red Star in order to open a place for a foreign player.

=== Iran ===
After being released from Red Star Belgrade, Bruno ended up signing with Iranian side Sanat Naft Abadan.

== Career statistics ==
As of match played 28 July 2018

Appearances and goals by club, season and competition
Club	Season	League			Cup		League Cup		Continental		Total	
Club	Season	Division	Apps	Goals	Apps	Goals	Apps	Goals	Apps	Goals	Apps	Goals
PKNS	2018	Malaysia Super League	9	7	2	0	0	0	–		11	7
PKNS	Total		9	7	2	0	0	0	0	0	11	7
Career Total			0	0	0	0	0	0	0	0	0	0

== Honours ==
Persija Jakarta

- Piala Indonesia runner-up: 2018–19

Individual

- Indonesia President's Cup Top Goalscorer: 2019 (shared)
