= Lucas Espíndola =

Argentine footballer (born 1994)

Lucas Espindola
Personal information
- Full name: Lucas Sebastian Espindola
- Date of birth: 29 June 1994 (age 32)
- Place of birth: Buenos Aires, Argentina
- Height: 1.82 m (5 ft 11 1/2 in)
- Position: Attacking midfielder

Team information
- Current team: Juventud Antoniana

Youth career
- All Boys

Senior career*
Years	Team	Apps	(Gls)
2012–2016	All Boys	11	(0)
2013–2014	→ Tigres (loan)	22	(5)
2015	→ Victoria (loan)	5	(0)
2017	PKNS FC	11	(5)
2017–	Juventud Antoniana	0	(0)
- * Club domestic league appearances and goals as of January 24, 2017

Lucas Sebastian Espindola (born 29 June 1994) is an Argentinian footballer who is currently playing for Juventud Antoniana.
