= Nazrin Syamsul =

Malaysian footballer

Nazrin Bahri
Personal information
- Full name: Mohamad Nazrin bin Syamsul Bahri
- Date of birth: 11 September 1990 (age 36)
- Place of birth: Kuala Lumpur, Malaysia
- Height: 1.66 m (5 ft 5 in)
- Position: Left winger

Team information
- Current team: UiTM
- Number: 6

Youth career
- 2009–2011: PKNS

Senior career*
Years	Team	Apps	(Gls)
2012–2018	PKNS	102	(4)
2019	Perlis	0	(0)
2019–	UiTM	0	(0)
- * Club domestic league appearances and goals as of 20 December 2017 ‡ National team caps and goals as of 4 June 2017

Mohd Nazrin bin Syamsul Bahri (born 11 September 1990) is a Malaysian professional footballer who plays for UiTM in Malaysia Premier League as a left winger.

A product of PKNS academy, Nazrin is known for his long range shooting accuracy, often while deployed in flank or centre half. Nazrin helped PKNS to 2016 FA Cup Final, the club's first ever final.

Nazrin originally promoted from PKNS President Cup team. The natural left footed player provide various good range of passing from flanker and later during E. Elavarasan helm, he adjusted to more central midfielder role.

With PKNS in recent years are much preferred more senior, established players and formerly capped by national team. Nazrin chance to play are bit in danger. He released by PKNS after 6 season with them.

2019 season he signed by Perlis but later the team was dissolved due to bad debt, unsettled sponsorship deal and overdue salary. The MFL decided to dissolved Perlis and the players given special permission to signed for other team. Nazrin signed by Uitm fc, shah alam based team. Just around the corner where he ply his trade with PKNS. He headed in a winning goal in home fixture against Sarawak.

== Career statistics ==
=== Club ===
As of 11 July 2018

Club	Season	League		Cup		League Cup		Total	
Club	Season	Apps	Goals	Apps	Goals	Apps	Goals	Apps	Goals
PKNS	2012	0	0	0	0	0	0	0	0
PKNS	2013	0	3	0	0	0	0	0	0
PKNS	2014	0	0	0	0	0	0	0	0
PKNS	2015	0	0	0	0	0	0	0	0
PKNS	2016	0	0	7	2	0	0	0	0
PKNS	2017	17	0	1	0	4	1	22	1
PKNS	2018	4	0	1	0	0	0	5	0
Total		0	0	0	0	0	0	0	0
