= Khyril Muhymeen =

Malaysian footballer

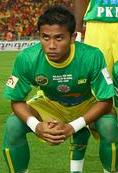
- Khyril in 2008

Personal information
- Full name: Mohd Khyril Muhymeen bin Zambri
- Date of birth: 9 May 1987 (age 39)
- Place of birth: Alor Setar, Malaysia
- Height: 1.67 m (5 ft 5 1/2 in)
- Position: Forward

Team information
- Current team: KL Rangers
- Number: 7

Youth career
- Bukit Jalil Sports School

Senior career*
Years	Team	Apps	(Gls)
2005–2014	Kedah	106	(39)
2015	Negeri Sembilan	20	(2)
2016	AirAsia	15	(1)
2017–2018	PKNS	22	(1)
2019	Perlis	3	(2)
2019–2020	Selangor	8	(3)
2021–2022	Petaling Jaya City	7	(0)
2023	Harini FT		
2024–2025	Bunga Raya Damansara		
2025–2026	KL Rangers		

International career^{‡}
2004–2006	Malaysia U-20	19	(3)
2006–2009	Malaysia U-23	17	(2)
2007–2013	Malaysia	31	(5)
Medal record
Malaysia
Asean Football Championship
Winner	AFF Suzuki Cup 2010	2010
- * Club domestic league appearances and goals ‡ National team caps and goals as of 24 January 2017

Mohd Khyril Muhymeen bin Zambri (born 9 May 1987) is a Malaysian professional footballer who plays as a forward. He also played for the Malaysia national, the Malaysia U-23 and the Malaysia U-20 team.

== Club career ==
=== Kedah ===
Born in Alor Setar, Khyril spent most of his career playing for Kedah. He scored 3 league goals in his debut season in 2005.

=== Negeri Sembilan ===
On 15 December 2014, Khyril agreed to sign a contract with Malaysia Premier League side Negeri Sembilan.

=== AirAsia ===
On 4 February 2016, Khyril signed a one-year contract with third-tier side AirAsia playing for the Malaysia FAM League.

=== PKNS ===
On 29 November 2016, Khyril signed a one-year contract with Malaysia Super League club PKNS. He made his debut for PKNS in a 1–0 defeat against Felda United on 21 January 2017. Khyril scored his first goal for the club in a 5–3 home win against Negeri Sembilan on 11 July 2018.

=== Selangor ===
In 2020 he signed for Selangor after leaving Perlis. He scored 3 goals in 8 appearances.

=== PJ City ===
After 2 years with Selangor, he joined Petaling Jaya City as his next destination.

=== Harini FT ===
Season 2023 saw him changing his professional football career path by completing his move to semi-pro club Harini FT, competing in the Malaysia M3 League.

== International career ==
Khyril was hit by a knee injury during representing Malaysia national team in a friendly match against Kenya in September 2009 that sidelined him for seven months. This injury cost him a place in 2009 SEA Games squad. He is fully recovered by April 2010 but far from his best as he performed cautiously to avoid injury.

In November 2010, Kyhril was called up to the national team by coach K. Rajagopal for the 2010 AFF Suzuki Cup. Malaysia won the 2010 AFF Suzuki Cup title for the first time in their history. He ended up the 2012 campaign becoming the team top scorers with 10 league goals, his best scoring tally since 2009 season and 4 goals in Malaysia FA Cup. He alongside his club teammates Baddrol Bakhtiar and Amar Rohidan were called up by coach, K. Rajagobal for the friendlies against Arsenal on 24 July 2012 and Manchester City on 30 July 2012 on their Asia Tour 2012.

== Career statistics ==
=== Club ===
As of 28 July 2018

Club	Season	League		Cup		League Cup		Total	
Club	Season	Apps	Goals	Apps	Goals	Apps	Goals	Apps	Goals
Kedah	2006–07	11	4	0	0	0	0	11	4
Kedah	2007–08	15	4	10	7	16	5	41	16
Kedah	2009	25	12	0	0	0	0	25	20
Kedah	2010	7	4	6	2	0	0	13	6
Kedah	2011	21	3	8	6	0	0	29	9
Kedah	2012	26	10	0	1	10	4	36	15
Kedah	2013	1	2	0	0	0	0	1	2
Total		106	39	24	16	26	9	156	64
Negeri Sembilan	2015	20	8	0	0	–	–	20	8
Total		20	8	0	0	–	–	20	8
AirAsia	2016	15	1	0	0	–	–	15	1
Total		15	1	0	0	–	–	15	1
PKNS	2017	12	0	0	0	2	0	14	0
PKNS	2018	10	1	2	0	5	0	17	1
Total		22	1	2	0	7	0	31	1
Career total		163	49	26	16	33	9	192	74

=== International ===
As of match played 28 June 2018

Appearances and goals by national team and year
National team	Year	Apps	Goals
Malaysia	2007	7	0
Malaysia	2008	7	2
Malaysia	2009	2	0
Malaysia	2010	3	0
Malaysia	2011	2	0
Malaysia	2012	6	2
Malaysia	2013	4	1
Total		31	5

==== International goals ====
Scores and results list Malaysia's goal tally first.

#	Date	Venue	Opponent	Score	Result	Competition
1.	10 October 2008	Bukit Jalil National Stadium, Kuala Lumpur, Malaysia	Pakistan	4–?	4–1	Friendly
2.	15 October 2008	Petaling Jaya, Petaling Jaya, Malaysia	Nepal	4–0	4–0	2008 Pestabola Merdeka
3.	20 November 2012	Bukit Jalil National Stadium, Kuala Lumpur, Malaysia	Bangladesh	1–0	1–1	Friendly
4.	28 November 2012	Bukit Jalil National Stadium, Kuala Lumpur, Malaysia	Laos	4–1	4–1	2012 AFF Suzuki Cup
5.	22 March 2013	Shah Alam Stadium, Shah Alam, Malaysia	Yemen	2–1	2–1	2015 AFC Asian Cup qualification

== Honours ==
=== Club ===
Kedah

- Malaysia Cup: 2007, 2008
- Malaysia Super League: 2006–2007, 2007–2008
- FA Cup Malaysia: 2007, 2008
- Malaysia Premier League: 2005–06

=== International ===
Malaysia U-18

- 2005: Lion City Cup

Malaysia

- 2007 : Pestabola Merdeka winner
- 2008 : Pestabola Merdeka runner-up
- 2010 : AFF Suzuki Cup winner
