= Azmizi Azmi =

Malaysian footballer

Personal information
- Full name: Azmizi bin Azmi
- Date of birth: 28 May 1986 (age 40)
- Place of birth: Perlis, Malaysia
- Height: 1.78 m (5 ft 10 in)
- Position: Defender

Team information
- Current team: Perlis
- Number: 17

Youth career
- 2005–2007: Perlis U21

Senior career*
Years	Team	Apps	(Gls)
2008–2011	Perlis	49	(3)
2012	Kedah	11	(0)
2013	Felda United	22	(1)
2014	Kedah	12	(2)
2015	Perak	21	(0)
2016	Perlis	21	(0)
2017–2018	PKNS	15	(0)
2019–	Perlis	0	(0)
- * Club domestic league appearances and goals as of 18 December 2018

Azmizi bin Azmi (born 28 May 1986) is a Malaysian footballer who plays for Perlis in Malaysia Premier League as a defender.

== Club career ==
Azmizi started his career in Perlis youth team, before gaining his chance in the senior squad in 2007. He played in the 2007 Malaysia FA Cup final, which Perlis has lost against Kedah. He was their club captain until the 2011 league season.

Azmizi moved to Kedah on loan for their 2011 Malaysia Cup campaign, as Perlis do not qualify for the tournament as a result of finishing last in the 2011 Super League Malaysia.

In 2012, Azmizi permanently joined Kedah for 2012 Super League Malaysia season, along with his Perlis teammate Mohd Sany Mat Isa.

== Career statistics ==
=== Club ===
As of 11 July 2018

Club	Season	League		Cup		League Cup		Asia		Total	
Club	Season	Apps	Goals	Apps	Goals	Apps	Goals	Apps	Goals	Apps	Goals
PKNS	2017	5	0	0	0	2	0	–	–	7	0
PKNS	2018	10	0	5	0	0	0	–	–	15	0
PKNS	Total	15	0	5	0	2	0	0	0	22	0
Career total		0	0	0	0	0	0	0	0	0	0
