= Nizam Abu Bakar =

Malaysian footballer

Mohd Nizam Abu Bakar
Personal information
- Full name: Mohd Nizam bin Abu Bakar
- Date of birth: 16 September 1984 (age 42)
- Place of birth: Tampin, Malaysia
- Height: 1.77 m (5 ft 9 1/2 in)
- Position: Defender

Team information
- Current team: Felcra
- Number: 24

Senior career*
Years	Team	Apps	(Gls)
2011	Felda United	0	(0)
2014	Negeri Sembilan	0	(0)
2015–2017	PKNS	31	(2)
2018–	Felcra	13	(0)
- * Club domestic league appearances and goals as of July 13, 2018

Mohd Nizam bin Abu Bakar (born 16 September 1984) is a Malaysian footballer who plays for Malaysia Premier League club Felcra as a defender.
