= Affize Faisal Mamat =

Malaysian footballer

Mohd Affize Faisal Mamat
Personal information
- Full name: Mohd Affize Faisal bin Mamat
- Date of birth: 14 March 1989 (age 37)
- Place of birth: Kuala Terengganu, Malaysia
- Height: 1.68 m (5 ft 6 in)
- Position: Midfielder

Youth career
- Bukit Jalil Sports School

Senior career*
| Years | Team | Apps | (Gls) |
| 2011–2012 | Harimau Muda A | 38 | (3) |
| 2013–2015 | ATM | | |
| 2016 | Terengganu | 11 | (0) |
| 2017 | PKNS | 5 | (0) |

International career^{‡}
| 2008–2009 | Malaysia U19 | 5 | (0) |
| 2009–2011 | Malaysia U21 | 7 | (0) |
| 2009–2012 | Malaysia U23 | 15 | (0) |
- * Club domestic league appearances and goals as of 15 July 2017 ‡ National team caps and goals as of 15 May 2014

Mohd Affize Faisal Mamat (born 14 March 1989) is a Malaysian footballer who plays as a central midfielder.
