= Tauffiq Ar-Rasyid =

Malaysian footballer

Personal information
- Full name: Tauffiq Ar-Rasyid bin Johar
- Date of birth: 14 December 1995 (age 30)
- Place of birth: Port Klang, Selangor, Malaysia
- Height: 1.86 m (6 ft 1 in)
- Position: Goalkeeper

Team information
- Current team: AAK
- Number: 22

Youth career
- 2012–2014: PKNS U-19
- 2015–2016: PKNS U-21

Senior career*
Years	Team	Apps	(Gls)
2017–2019	PKNS	10	(0)
2020–2021	Selangor	2	(0)
2022	Sarawak United	8	(0)
2023–2025	Negeri Sembilan	3	(0)
2025–	AAK Puncak Alam		
- * Club domestic league appearances and goals

Tauffiq Ar-Rasyid bin Johar (born 14 September 1995) is a Malaysian professional footballer who plays as a goalkeeper for Malaysia A2 Amateur League club AAK Puncak Alam.

== Club career ==
=== PKNS ===
On 11 July 2017, Tauffiq made his debut with PKNS playing against Penang that end up PKNS won by 0–2.

=== Selangor ===
In 2019, he joined Selangor. Spent three seasons in Selangor as a squad player. He has decided to leave Selangor and has joined Sarawak in 2022.

=== Sarawak ===
In Sarawak he started by being the second goalkeeper who often gave competition to Sarawak's main goalkeeper at the time, Sharbinee Allawee. Then he was trusted by the Sarawak coach to be the main goalkeeper. He has played 12 games out of 26 overall in 2022.

=== Negeri Sembilan ===
He was officially announced as a new Negeri Sembilan player on January 10, 2023.
