= Azmi Muslim =

Malaysian footballer (born 1986)

Personal information
- Full name: Mohamad Azmi bin Muslim
- Date of birth: 17 October 1986 (age 40)
- Place of birth: Penang, Malaysia
- Height: 1.80 m (5 ft 11 in)
- Position: Left-back

Team information
- Current team: AAK (assistant)

Senior career*
Years	Team	Apps	(Gls)
2006–2008	UPB-MyTeam		
2008–2011	Kedah		
2012	ATM		
2013	Johor Darul Ta'zim		
2013	Felda United		
2014–2016	Selangor	35	(0)
2017	PKNS	19	(0)
2018	Melaka United	14	(0)
2019	Perlis		
2020–2022	Penang	21	(0)
2022	→ PDRM (loan)	9	(1)
2023	PDRM	9	(1)
2024–2025	AAK		

International career^{‡}
2009	Malaysia U-23	10	(1)
2009–2014	Malaysia	19	(0)
Medal record
Men's football
Representing Malaysia
Southeast Asian Games
First place	2009
AFF Championship
Runner-up	2014
- * Club domestic league appearances and goals ‡ National team caps and goals as of 24 January 2017

Mohamad Azmi bin Muslim (born 17 October 1986) is a Malaysian former professional footballer who played as a left-back.

== Club career ==
=== Early career ===
Azmi began his football career with UPB-MyTeam before signed with Kedah.

== International career ==
He was a member of the Malaysia national under-23 football team and a member of the 2009 Laos Sea Games Football Gold medal-winning squad. He has played for the Malaysian national football team, and in 2009 he played twice against Uzbekistan in the 2011 AFC Asian Cup qualification.

== Career statistics ==
=== Club ===
As of 22 July 2018

Appearances and goals by club, season and competition
Club	Season	League			Cup		League Cup		Continental		Total	
Club	Season	Division	Apps	Goals	Apps	Goals	Apps	Goals	Apps	Goals	Apps	Goals
Selangor	2014	Malaysia Super League	17	0	1	0	7	0	4	1	29	1
Selangor	2015	Malaysia Super League	9	0	0	0	2	0	–	–	11	0
Selangor	2016	Malaysia Super League	9	0	2	0	7	0	4	0	22	0
Selangor	Total		35	0	3	0	16	0	8	1	62	1
PKNS	2017	Malaysia Super League	19	0	1	0	4	0	–	–	24	0
PKNS	Total		19	0	1	0	4	0	–	–	24	0
Melaka United	2018	Malaysia Super League	14	0	1	0	0	0	–	–	15	0
Melaka United	Total		14	0	1	0	0	0	–	–	15	0
Career Total			0	0	0	0	0	0	–	–	0	0

== Honours ==
=== Club ===
Selangor

- Malaysia Cup: 2015

Penang

- Malaysia Premier League: 2020

=== International ===
- Southeast Asian Games Gold Medal: 2009
- AFF Suzuki Cup runner-up: 2014
