= 2013 Liga Super goalscorers =

This is the list of 2013 Malaysia Super League goalscorers.

== Goals ==
As of 6 July 2013

16 goals

- Marlon Alex James (ATM FA)

14 goals

- Patrick Ronaldinho Wleh (PKNS FC)

10 goals

- Francis Forkey Doe (Selangor FA)

9 goals

- Paulo Rangel (Perak FA)

8 goals

- Shahril Ishak (LionsXII)
- Mohd Fauzi Roslan (Pahang FA)
- Mohd Amri Yahyah (Selangor FA)

7 goals

- Norshahrul Idlan Talaha (Johor Darul Takzim)

6 goals

- Daniel Güiza (Johor Darul Takzim)
- Indra Putra Mahayuddin (Kelantan FA)
- Mohd Nor Farhan Muhammad (Kelantan FA)
- Mohd Badhri Mohd Radzi (Kelantan FA)
- Jean-Emmanuel Effa Owona (Terengganu FA)

5 goals

- Mohd Nurul Azwan Roya (Johor Darul Takzim)
- Keita Mandjou (Kelantan FA)
- Fazrul Nawaz (LionsXII)
- Shahfiq Ghani (LionsXII)
- R. Gopinathan (Pahang FA)
- Damir Ibrić (T-Team FC)

4 goals

- D. Christie Jayaseelan (ATM FA)
- Hairuddin Omar (ATM FA)
- Muhammad Shukor Adan (ATM FA)
- Leonel Núñez (Johor Darul Takzim)
- Safuwan Baharudin (LionsXII)
- Mohd Hafiz Kamal (Pahang FA)
- Mohd Faizol Hussien (Pahang FA)
- Mohd Fauzan Dzulkifli (PKNS FC)
- Mohd Nizad Ayub (PKNS FC)
- Mohd Ashaari Shamsuddin (Terengganu FA)
- Abdul Latiff Suhaimi (T-Team FC)

3 goals

- Rudie Ramli (FELDA United FC)
- Dickson Nwakaeme (Kelantan FA)
- Matías Conti (Pahang FA)
- Mohd Razman Roslan (Pahang FA)
- R. Surendran (Pahang FA)
- Abdul Hadi Yahya (Perak FA)
- Azlan Ismail (Perak FA)
- Roman Chmelo (PKNS FC)
- Mohd Raimi Mohd Nor (Selangor FA)
- S. Kunanlan (Selangor FA)
- Abdul Manaf Mamat (Terengganu FA)
- Khairul Ramadhan Zauwawi (Terengganu FA)

2 goals

- Bruno Martelotto (ATM FA)
- Mohd Safee Mohd Sali (Johor Darul Takzim)
- Mohammed Ghaddar (FELDA United FC)
- Razali Umar Kandasamy (FELDA United FC)
- Mohd Faiz Subri (Kelantan FA)
- Baihakki Khaizan (LionsXII)
- Hariss Harun (LionsXII)
- Mohd Nazrin Mohd Nawi (Negeri Sembilan FA)
- Shahurain Abu Samah (Negeri Sembilan FA)
- Mohd Helmi Remeli (PKNS FC)
- Mohd Nazrin Syamsul Bahri (PKNS FC)
- K. Gurusamy (Selangor FA)
- Ismail Faruqi Asha'ri (Terengganu FA)
- Mohd Fakhrurazi Musa (Terengganu FA)
- Mohd Farderin Kadir (Terengganu FA)
- George Boateng (T-Team FC)

1 goals

- Amirizwan Taj Tajuddin (ATM FA)
- Irwan Fadzli Idrus (ATM FA)
- Norfazly Alias (ATM FA)
- Rezal Zambery Yahya (ATM FA)
- Venice Elphi (ATM FA)
- Ahmad Ezrie Shafizie Sazali (Johor Darul Takzim)
- Jasazrin Jamaluddin (Johor Darul Takzim)
- Kamarul Afiq Kamaruddin (Johor Darul Takzim)
- Mohd Aidil Zafuan Abdul Radzak (Johor Darul Takzim)
- Mohd Safiq Rahim (Johor Darul Takzim)
- Simone Del Nero (Johor Darul Takzim)
- Azmizi Azmi (FELDA United FC)
- Júnior Pereira (FELDA United FC)
- Leonel Saint-Preux (FELDA United FC)
- Mohd Khairul Anuar Jamil (FELDA United FC)
- Mohd Riduwan Ma'on (FELDA United FC)
- Ahmad Fakri Saarani (Kelantan FA)
- Mohd Zamri Ramli (Kelantan FA)
- Zairo Anuar Zalani (Kelantan FA)
- Zairul Fitree Ishak (Kelantan FA)
- Faris Ramli (LionsXII)
- Khairul Nizam (LionsXII)
- Nazrul Nazari (LionsXII)
- Shakir Hamzah (LionsXII)
- Syafiq Zainal (LionsXII)
- Eddy Helmi Abdul Manan (Negeri Sembilan FA)
- Fabio Leandro Barbosa (Negeri Sembilan FA)
- Mohd Fauzi Nan (Negeri Sembilan FA)
- Mohd Firdaus Azizul (Negeri Sembilan FA)
- Mohd Rahizi Rasib (Negeri Sembilan FA)
- Abdul Malik Mat Ariff (Pahang FA)
- Damion Stewart (Pahang FA)
- Mohd Amirul Hadi Zainal (Pahang FA)
- Mohd Azamuddin Md Akil (Pahang FA)
- Mohamed Borji (Pahang FA)
- Mohd Azrul Ahmad (Perak FA)
- Karim Rouani (Perak FA)
- Mohd Failee Mohamad Ghazli (Perak FA)
- Muhd Rafiuddin Rodin (Perak FA)
- Muhd Shahrom Abdul Kalam (Perak FA)
- Noor Hazrul Mustafa (Perak FA)
- Mohamad Fazli Baharudin (PKNS FC)
- Mohd Faiz Mohd Isa (PKNS FC)
- Muhd Fakhrul Aiman Sidid (PKNS FC)
- Muhd Khairu Azrin Khazali (PKNS FC)
- Nazmi Faiz (PKNS FC)
- Zamri Morshidi (PKNS FC)
- Adam Griffiths (Selangor FA)
- Mahali Jasuli (Selangor FA)
- Mohd Nasriq Baharom (Selangor FA)
- Mohd Ramzul Zahini Adnan (Selangor FA)
- Ramez Dayoub (Selangor FA)
- G. Puaneswaran (Terengganu FA)
- Mohd Faizal Muhammad (Terengganu FA)
- Mohd Nasril Izzat Jalil (Terengganu FA)
- Ahmad Syamim Yahaya (T-Team FC)
- Ahmad Takhiyuddin Roslan (T-Team FC)
- Azrul Hazran Amiludin (T-Team FC)
- Mohd Aizulridzwan Razali (T-Team FC)
- Mohd Muinuddin Mokhtar (T-Team FC)
- Mohd Syuhiran Zainal (T-Team FC)

== Own goal ==
1 goal

- Mohd Nuraliff Zainal Abidin (T-Team FC) (for Perak FA)
- Jalaluddin Jaafar (Pahang FA) (for Perak FA)
- Hasmizan Kamarodin (Terengganu FA) (for LionsXII)
- P. Gunalan (PKNS FC) (for Darul Takzim FC)
- Mohd Azrul Ahmad (FELDA United FC) (for LionsXII)
- Mohd Helmi Remeli (PKNS FC) (for Pahang FA)

== See also ==
- Super League Malaysia seasons
- 2013 Malaysia Super League
- Malaysia Super League
