= 2013 Malaysia Super League =

Liga Super
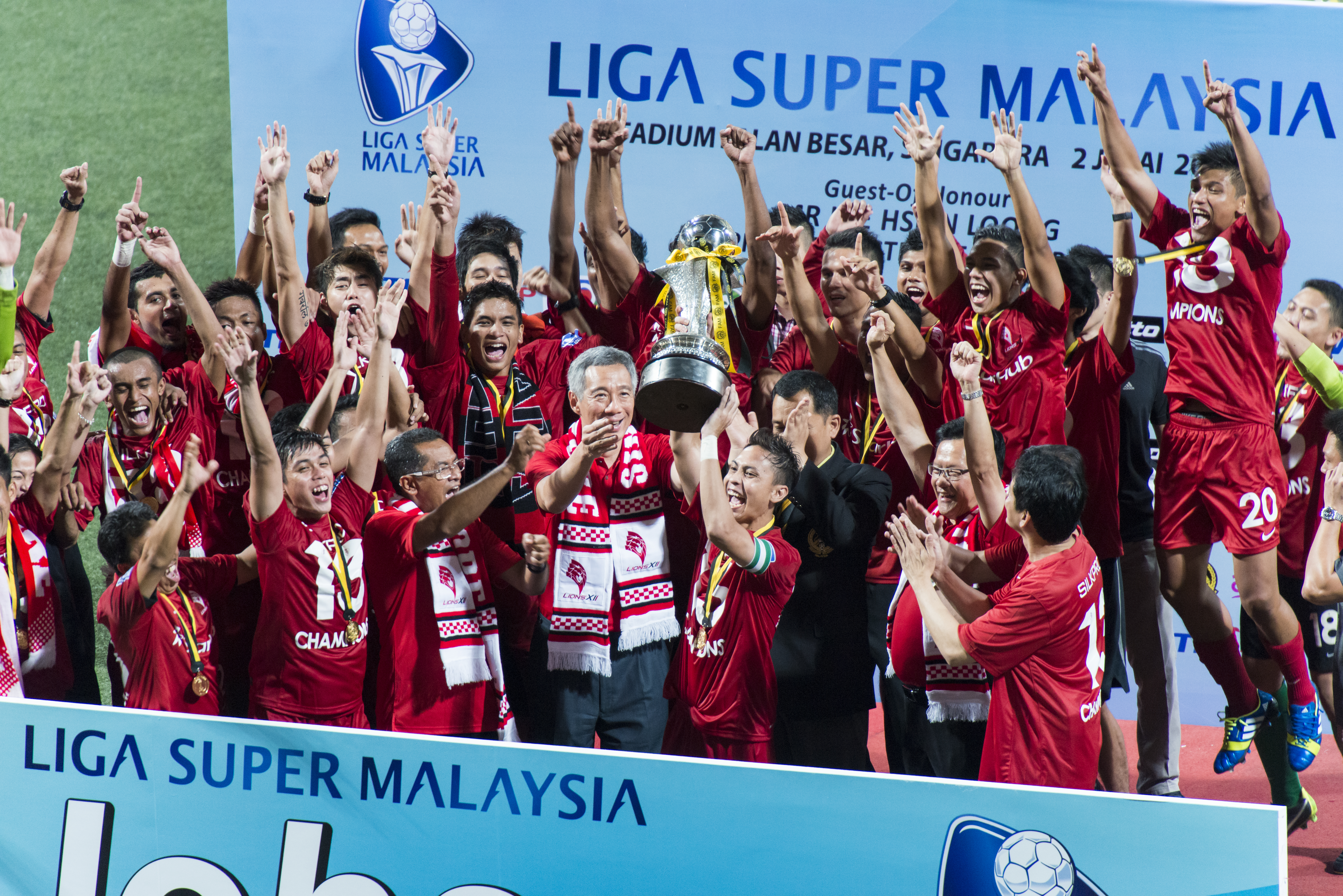
- LionsXII captain Shahril Ishak receiving the trophy from Singapore Prime Minister Lee Hsien Loong
- Season: 2013
- Dates: 8 January - 6 July 2013
- Champions: LionsXII; 1st Super League title 1st Liga M title
- Relegated: Felda United; Negeri Sembilan
- AFC Cup: Kelantan; Selangor
- Matches: 132
- Goals: 323 (2.45 per match)
- Top goalscorer: Marlon Alex James (16 goals)
- Biggest home win: PKNS 5–0 Felda United
- Biggest away win: Felda United 0–4 T-Team; Terengganu 0–4 Kelantan
- Highest scoring: PKNS 4–5 Pahang
- Longest winning run: 4 matches Kelantan (21 June – 6 July 2013)
- Longest unbeaten run: 16 matches LionsXII
- Longest winless run: 16 matches Negeri Sembilan
- Longest losing run: 5 matches T-Team

The 2013 Liga Super (English: 2013 Super League) also known as the Astro Liga Super for sponsorship reasons, is the 10th season of the Liga Super, the top-tier professional football league in Malaysia.

The season was held from 8 January and concluded on 6 July 2013. The Liga Super champions for 2013 was won by Singaporean side LionsXII.

== Team changes ==
The following teams have changed division.

=== To Malaysia Super League ===
Promoted from Premier League

- ATM
- Pahang

=== From Malaysia Super League ===
Relegated to Premier League

- Sarawak
- Kedah
- Sabah
- Kuala Lumpur

=== Name changes ===
- Johor FC were rebranded and renamed to Darul Takzim FC and relocated to Larkin, Johor.

== Teams ==
A total of twelve teams will compete in the 2013 season which includes the top 10 teams that participated in the 2012 season, champion of the 2012 Liga Premier, and the winner of the play-off round between teams finishing 11th to 13th in the Liga Super as well as the team finishing 2nd in the Liga Premier.

Kuala Lumpur was relegated at the end of the 2012 Liga Super season after finishing in the bottom place of the league table. Sarawak, Sabah and Kedah were also relegated after losing the playoffs.

2012 Liga Premier champions Angkatan Tentera Malaysia secured direct promotion to the Liga Super. Meanwhile, 2012 Liga Premier runner-up Pahang clinched the promotion after winning the playoff rounds.

- Kelantan (2012 Liga Super winner)
- LionsXII
- Selangor
- Perak
- Terengganu
- Negeri Sembilan
- PKNS
- T-Team
- Johor Darul Takzim
- Felda United
- ATM^{1}
- Pahang^{2}

Note:
^{1}Promoted from 2012 Liga Premier
^{2}Winners of 2013 Liga Super/Liga Premier Play-off round

== Team summaries ==
=== Stadium ===
Locations of teams in the 2013 Liga Super

Team	Based	Stadium	Capacity
ATM	Kuala Lumpur	Selayang Stadium	40,000
Felda United	Kuala Lumpur	Petaling Jaya Stadium*	25,000
Johor Darul Takzim	Johor Bahru	Larkin Stadium	30,000
Kelantan	Kota Bharu	Sultan Muhammad IV Stadium	30,000
Negeri Sembilan	Seremban	Tuanku Abdul Rahman Stadium	40,000
Pahang	Kuantan	Darulmakmur Stadium	40,000
Perak	Ipoh	Perak Stadium	42,500
PKNS	Shah Alam	Shah Alam Stadium	80,000
Selangor	Shah Alam	Shah Alam Stadium	80,000
LionsXII	Singapore	Jalan Besar Stadium	8,000
Terengganu	Kuala Terengganu	Sultan Ismail Nasiruddin Shah Stadium	15,000
T-Team	Kuala Terengganu	Sultan Ismail Nasiruddin Shah Stadium	15,000

Matches may not be played at night at stadiums marked with an asterisk (*) because the floodlights do not meet FAM regulations.

=== Stadium changes ===
- Johor Darul Takzim moved to the Tan Sri Dato Hj Hassan Yunos Stadium and will host their home matches there after occupying the previous stadium, Pasir Gudang Corporation Stadium.
- ATM moved to the Selayang Stadium and will host their home matches there after occupying the previous stadium, Petaling Jaya Stadium.
- Felda United moved to the Petaling Jaya Stadium and will host their home matches there after occupying the previous stadium, Hang Jebat Stadium.

=== Personnel and sponsoring ===
Team	Coach	Captain	Kit manufacturer	Shirt sponsor
ATM	B. Sathianathan	Hairuddin Omar	Macron	
Felda United	K. Devan	Kaironnisam Sahabudin	Umbro	FGV
Johor Darul Takzim	Fandi Ahmad	Kamarul Afiq Kamaruddin	Kappa	Johor Corporation
Kelantan	Bojan Hodak	Mohd Badhri Mohd Radzi	Warriors	Hotlink
Negeri Sembilan	Divaldo Alves	Norhafiz Zamani Misbah	Lotto	Matrix Concept
Pahang	Dollah Salleh	Jalaluddin Jaafar	Stobi	Resort World Genting
T-Team	Eduardo Almeida	Mohd Marzuki Yusof	Kappa	EPIC
Perak	Azraai Khor Abdullah	Shahrulnizam Mustapa	Kappa	Lembaga Air Perak
PKNS	Abdul Rahman Ibrahim	Mohd Helmi Remeli	Lotto	PKNS
Selangor	Irfan Bakti Abu Salim	Mohd Asraruddin Putra Omar	Kappa	MBI
LionsXII	V. Sundramoorthy	Shahril Ishak	Nike	StarHub
Terengganu	E. Elavarasan	Mohd Faizal Muhammad	Specs	Desa Murni Batik

=== Coaching changes ===
==== Pre-season ====
Club	Outgoing Head Coach	Date of vacancy	Manner of departure	Incoming Head Coach	Date of appointment
Terengganu	Peter James Butler	17 September 2012	Suspended for 6 months(Suspending ended by FAM. Later signed by T-Team)	E. Elavarasan	18 October 2012
T-Team	Yunus Alif	September 2012	Resigned	Peter James Butler	18 November 2012
Felda United	E. Elavarasan	18 October 2012	Signed by Terengganu	K. Devan	1 November 2012
Johor Darul Takzim	Sazali Saidon	31 October 2012	Contract Expired	Fandi Ahmad	1 November 2012
Perak	Jang Jung	31 October 2012	Contract Expired	Mohd Azraai Khor Abdullah	1 November 2012
Negeri Sembilan	Mohd Azraai Khor Abdullah	31 October 2012	Contract Expired	Divaldo Alves	1 November 2012

==== In season ====
Club	Outgoing Head Coach	Date of vacancy	Manner of departure	Incoming Head Coach	Date of appointment
T-Team	Peter James Butler	16 May 2013	Mutual Termination	Eduardo Almeida	16 May 2013

=== Sponsorship changes ===
Club	New Sponsor	Previous Sponsor	Date

== Foreign players ==
Club	Visa 1	Visa 2	Visa 3	Visa 4	Former Player(s)
ATM	(Argentina) Bruno Martelotto	(Saint Vincent and the Grenadines) Marlon Alex James	NA	NA	NA
Johor Darul Takzim	(Brazil) Andrezinho	(Argentina) Leonel Núñez	NA	NA	(Italy) Simone Del Nero (Spain) Dani Güiza
Felda United	(Democratic Republic of the Congo) Nsumbu Mazuwa	(Haiti) Leonel Saint-Preux	NA	NA	(Brazil) Júnior Pereira (Lebanon) Mohamad Ghaddar
Kelantan	(Nigeria) Obinna Nwaneri	(Nigeria) Dickson Nwakaeme	(Croatia) Lek Kcira	(Australia) Dimitri Petratos	(Guinea) Mandjou Keita
Negeri Sembilan	(Cameroon) William Modibo	(Brazil) Fabio Leandro Barbosa	NA	NA	(Argentina) Emanuel de Porras
Pahang	(Jamaica) Damion Stewart	(Argentina) Matías Conti	NA	NA	(Morocco) Mohamed Borji (North Macedonia) Nikolce Klečkarovski
T-Team	(Netherlands) George Boateng	(Bosnia and Herzegovina) Damir Ibrić	NA	NA	NA
Perak	(Brazil) Rafael Silva	(Brazil) Paulo Rangel	NA	NA	(Morocco) Karim Rouani
PKNS	(Liberia) Patrick Wleh	(Slovakia) Roman Chmelo	NA	NA	(Tunisia) Helmi Loussaief
Selangor	(Liberia) Forkey Doe	(Australia) Adam Griffiths	(Slovakia) Michal Kubala	(Slovakia) Peter Chrappan	(Lebanon) Ramez Dayoub
LionsXII	NA	NA	NA	NA	NA
Terengganu	(Cameroon) Effa Owona	(Cameroon) Vincent Bikana	NA	NA	NA

Note:

- Teams participating in the 2013 AFC Cup (Kelantan and Selangor) can employ two extra foreign players, as the AFC allows four foreign players, of which one of them must be an Asian player, but the third and fourth foreign players are only allowed to play in the AFC Cup 2013 Tournament.
- LionsXII will not be permitted to have any foreign players as it is intended to remain as a development team for Singaporean players.
- FAM allow three foreign players quota starts season 2014.

== League table ==
Pos	Team	Pld	W	D	L	GF	GA	GD	Pts	Qualification or relegation
1	LionsXII (Note: LionsXII was not eligible for any AFC competition spots as they were a foreign side.)	22	12	7	3	32	15	+17	43	
2	Selangor	22	10	10	2	31	17	+14	40	2014 AFC Cup group stage
3	Johor Darul Ta'zim	22	11	7	4	32	26	+6	40	
4	Kelantan	22	10	6	6	32	20	+12	36	2014 AFC Cup group stage (Note: Qualified as 2013 Piala FA winners)
5	Pahang	22	10	5	7	36	32	+4	35	
6	ATM	22	10	4	8	35	25	+10	34	
7	Perak	22	8	5	9	23	27	−4	29	
8	PKNS	22	8	4	10	34	34	0	28	
9	Terengganu	22	7	6	9	25	31	−6	27	
10	T-Team	22	5	4	13	19	33	−14	19	
11	Felda United	22	4	7	11	13	35	−22	19	Relegation to 2014 Liga Premier
12	Negeri Sembilan	22	1	7	14	11	28	−17	10	Relegation to 2014 Liga Premier

Source: RSSSF
Rules for classification: 1) points; 2) goal difference; 3) number of goals scored

== Results ==
Fixtures and Results of the Liga Super 2013 season.

=== Week 1 ===
8 January	Terengganu	1–1	Felda United	Sultan Ismail Nasiruddin Shah Stadium, Kuala Terengganu, Terengganu
16:45 UTC+08:00	Faizal Muhammad (yellow card) 7'; Zubir Azmi (yellow card) 55'; Ismail Faruqi 59'		Nizam Abu Bakar (yellow card) 27'; Mohammed Ghaddar 53'; Azmizi Azmi (yellow card) 61'	Referee: Kamal Ahmad (Kuala Lumpur)

8 January	Perak	1–0	T-Team	Lumut Stadium, Ipoh, Perak
20:45 UTC+08:00	Nuraliff Zainal 90+4' (o.g.)		Latiff Suhaimi (yellow card) 65'	Referee: Wan Mohd tarmizi Wan Ibrahim (Selangor)

8 January	Selangor	1–0	Negeri Sembilan	Shah Alam Stadium, Shah Alam, Selangor
20:45 UTC+08:00	Amri Yahyah (yellow card) 19'; Bunyamin Umar (yellow card) 44'; S. Kunanlan (yellow card) 63' (goal) 68'	Report	Fauzi Nan (yellow card) 29'; Nazrin Nawi (yellow card) 66'	Referee: Suhaizi Shukri (Melaka)

8 January	Pahang	3–2	Johor Darul Takzim	Darulmakmur Stadium, Kuantan, Pahang
20:45 UTC+08:00	Fauzi Roslan 49', 72'; R. Surendran 82'; Nasril Nourdin (yellow card) 90+3'; Amirul Hadi Zainal (yellow card) 90+4'	Report	Tuah Iskandar (yellow card) 8'; Safiq Rahim 11'; Norshahrul Idlan 26'; Al-Hafiz Hamzah (yellow card) 28'; Ahmad Ezrie (yellow card) 75'	Referee: Samsudin Ibrahim (Terengganu)

9 January	Kelantan	2–1	PKNS	Sultan Mohammad IV Stadium, Kota Bharu, Kelantan
20:45 UTC+08:00	Badhri Radzi 16'; Zairul Fitree 90+2'	Report	Helmi Remeli 13'; Faiz Isa (yellow card) 61'	Attendance: 10,000

9 January	ATM	0–1	LionsXII	Tuanku Abdul Rahman Stadium, Paroi, Negeri Sembilan
20:45 UTC+08:00	Ammar Abdul Aziz (yellow card) 85'	Report	Syafiq Zainal (yellow card) 68'; Shahril Ishak 69'; Baihakki Khaizan (yellow card) 80'	Referee: Nagor Amir Noor Mohamed

=== Week 2 ===
11 January	Felda United	0–1	Pahang	Petaling Jaya Stadium, Kelana Jaya, Selangor
16:45 UTC+08:00	Mohd Azrul Ahmad (yellow card) 56'	Report	R. Surendran (yellow card) 45'; Mohamed Borji 89'

11 January	Negeri Sembilan	0–0	Terengganu	Tuanku Abdul Rahman Stadium, Paroi, Negeri Sembilan
20:45 UTC+08:00	Paul Modibo (yellow card) 17'	Report	Vincent Bikana (yellow card) 21'; Qhairul Anwar (yellow card) 36'; Ashaari Shamsuddin (yellow card) 68'; Faizal Muhammad (yellow card) 70'	Referee: Mohd. Zamzaidi Katimin (Melaka)

11 January	Johor Darul Takzim	1–0	Perak	Tan Sri Dato Haji Hassan Yunos Stadium, Johor Bahru, Johor
20:45 UTC+08:00	Aidil Zafuan 49'; Nurul Azwan Roya (yellow card) 84'	Report	Mohamad Hisyamudin (yellow card) 24' (yellow card) 45+1' (red card); Khairi Kiman (yellow card) 27' (yellow card) 38' (red card)	Referee: Syed Azhar Syed Kamar

12 January	T-Team	1–0	Kelantan	Sultan Ismail Nasiruddin Shah Stadium, Kuala Terengganu, Terengganu
16:45 UTC+08:00	Aizulridzwan Razali 7' (yellow card) 67'; Hasbullah Awang (yellow card) 21'; Nuraliff Zainal Abidin (yellow card) 39'; George Boateng (yellow card) 60'	Report	Haris Safwan (yellow card) 63'; Nor Farhan (yellow card) 89'	Referee: Zulkifli Ahmad (Kuala Lumpur)

12 January	LionsXII	1–0	Selangor	Jalan Besar Stadium, Singapore
19:45 UTC+08:00	Fazrul Nawaz 24'; Safuwan Baharudin (yellow card) 44'; Isa Halim (yellow card) 45'; Hafiz Abu Sujad (yellow card) 48'; Irwan Shah (yellow card) 64'	Report	Asraruddin Putra (yellow card) 84'; Ramez Dayoub (yellow card) 85'

12 January	PKNS	1–3	ATM	Shah Alam Stadium, Shah Alam, Selangor
20:45 UTC+08:00	Patrick Wleh (yellow card) 8' (yellow card) 60' (red card); Fazli Baharuddin 27'; Nizad Ayub (yellow card) 24'; Helmi Loussaief (yellow card) 59'	Report	Marlon 6' (pen.), 64', 72'; A. Varanthan (yellow card) 61'	Referee: Ku Alaudin Ku Muhammad (Kelantan)

=== Week 3 ===
15 January	Terengganu	1–2	Selangor	Sultan Ismail Nasiruddin Shah Stadium, Kuala Terengganu, Terengganu
16:45 UTC+08:00	Effa Owona 18'; Ismail Faruqi Asha'ri (yellow card) 55'		S. Kunanlan 7'; Amri Yahyah 16' (yellow card) 58'; Ramez Dayoub (yellow card) 90+1'	Referee: Zofri Tajudin

15 January	Pahang	2–1	Negeri Sembilan	Darulmakmur Stadium, Kuantan, Pahang
20:45 UTC+08:00	Fauzi Roslan 28'; Saiful Nizam (yellow card) 59'; Faizol Hussien 74'; Nikolce Klečkarovski (yellow card) 90+8'	Report	Abdul Ghani (yellow card) 60'; Rahizi Rasib 88'	Referee: Ahmad Tajuddin Mohd Yusof (Kuala Lumpur)

15 January	Perak	0–1	Felda United	Lumut Stadium, Ipoh, Perak
20:45 UTC+08:00	Nazri Kamal (yellow card) 31'		Azmizi Azmi 41'; Fauzi Saari (yellow card) 49'; Helmi Eliza (yellow card) 83'

15 January	PKNS	1–0	LionsXII	Shah Alam Stadium, Shah Alam, Selangor
20:45 UTC+08:00	Nazrin Syamsul 78' (yellow card) 78'; Ally Imran (yellow card) 87'		Baihakki Khaizan (yellow card) 49'; Gabriel Quak (yellow card) 68'; Nazrul Nazari (yellow card) 87'; Fazrul Nawaz (red card) 90+5'

15 January	ATM	3–0	T-Team	Tuanku Abdul Rahman Stadium, Paroi, Negeri Sembilan
20:45 UTC+08:00	K. Reuben (yellow card) 13'; Shukor Adan 47'; Rezal Zambery 65'; Amirizwan Taj (yellow card) 71'; Marlon 87'; A. Varanthan (yellow card) 90'		Aizulridzwan Razali (yellow card) 6'	Referee: Teoh Hee Loon (Melaka)

15 January	Kelantan	1–1	Johor Darul Takzim	Sultan Mohammad IV Stadium, Kota Bharu, Kelantan
20:45 UTC+08:00	Daudsu Jamaluddin (yellow card) 25'; Norfarhan Muhammad 37'; Obinna Nwaneri (yellow card) 44'	Report	Daniel Güiza 63' (yellow card) 89'; Ahmad Ezrie (yellow card) 80'; Akram Mahinan (yellow card) 90+3'	Referee: Suhaimi Mat Hassan (Terengganu)

=== Week 4 ===
18 January	Felda United	0–0	Kelantan	Petaling Jaya Stadium, Kelana Jaya, Selangor
16:45 UTC+08:00	Azmizi Azmi (yellow card) 37'; Fauzi Saari (yellow card) 65'	Report	Khairul Izuan (yellow card) 43'; Nik Shahrul Azim (yellow card) 74'	Referee: Mohd Jeffri Zolkefli (Perak)

18 January	T-Team	0–3	PKNS	Sultan Ismail Nasiruddin Shah Stadium, Kuala Terengganu, Terengganu
16:45 UTC+08:00	Hassan Basri (yellow card) 83'		Fauzan Dzulkifli 14' (yellow card) 62'; Alyy Imran (yellow card) 24'; Patrick Wleh 31'; Fakrul Aiman 71'	Referee: Les Mostia Mohen Mohd Tisan (Negeri Sembilan)

18 January	Johor Darul Takzim	2–2	ATM	Tan Sri Dato Haji Hassan Yunos Stadium, Johor Bahru, Johor
20:45 UTC+08:00	Daniel Güiza 18'; Muslim Ahmad (yellow card) 38'; Norshahrul Idlan 40'	Report	Amirizwan Taj 7'; Irwan Fadzli 39'; Fitri Omar (yellow card) 49' (yellow card) 83' (red card); Rezal Zambery (yellow card) 83'; Marlon (yellow card) 90'	Referee: Suhaizi Shukri (Melaka)

19 January	LionsXII	2–1	Terengganu	Jalan Besar Stadium, Singapore
19:45 UTC+08:00	Faritz Hameed (yellow card) 33'; Baihakki Khaizan (yellow card) 40'; Safuwan Baharudin 64'; Syafiq Zainal 74'	Report	Effa Owona 32' (yellow card) 37'

19 January	Negeri Sembilan	0–1	Perak	Tuanku Abdul Rahman Stadium, Paroi, Negeri Sembilan
20:45 UTC+08:00	Rashid Mahmud (yellow card) 39'; Nazrin Nawi (yellow card) 58'; Shahurain (yellow card) 90'		Mohd Hisyamudin (yellow card) 40' (yellow card) 90+1' (red card); M. Sivakumar (yellow card) 76'; Shahrom Abdul Kalam (yellow card) 90+3'; Failee Ghazli 90+6' (yellow card) 90+7'

19 January	Selangor	3–2	Pahang	Shah Alam Stadium, Shah Alam, Selangor
20:45 UTC+08:00	Amri Yahyah 3', 20'; Fairuz Abdul Aziz (yellow card) 36'; S. Veenod (yellow card) 39'; Forkey Doe (yellow card) 48'; Ramzul Zahini 80'	Report	Fauzi Roslan 24'; Razman Roslan 44' (pen.); R. Gopinathan (yellow card) 69'; R. Surendran (yellow card) 74'; Saiful Nizam (yellow card) 90+2'

=== Week 5 ===
22 January	T-Team	1–0	LionsXII	Sultan Ismail Nasiruddin Shah Stadium, Kuala Terengganu, Terengganu
16:45 UTC+08:00	Hafizan Talib (yellow card) 55'; Badrul Hisyam 75' (pen.); Naim Zakaria (yellow card) 77'; Aizulridzwan Razali (yellow card) 88'	Report	Safirul Sulaiman (yellow card) 63'	Referee: Syed Azhar Syed Kamar (Kuala Lumpur)

22 January	Perak	1–1	Selangor	Lumut Stadium, Ipoh, Perak
20:45 UTC+08:00	Nasir Basharuddin (yellow card) 12'; Failee Mohd Ghazli (yellow card) 68'; Hadi Yahya 81' (pen.)	Report	Adib Aizuddin (yellow card) 19'; Amri Yahyah (yellow card) 36'; Forkey Doe 66' (yellow card) 79'; Ramzul Zahini (yellow card) 69'	Referee: Zulkifli Ahmad

22 January	Kelantan	0–0	Negeri Sembilan	Sultan Mohammad IV Stadium, Kota Bharu, Kelantan
20:45 UTC+08:00			Fauzi Nan (yellow card) 65'; De Porras (yellow card) 67'; Nazrin Nawi (yellow card) 90+6'	Referee: Nagor Amir Noor Mohamad

22 January	Pahang	3–0	Terengganu	Darulmakmur Stadium, Kuantan, Pahang
20:45 UTC+08:00	Hafiz Kamal 77', 90'; Fauzi Roslan 78'	Report	Nik Zul Aziz (yellow card) 30'; Hasmizan (yellow card) 76'; Vincent Bikana (yellow card) 78'; Manaf Mamat (yellow card) 90+4'	Referee: Kamal Ahmad (Kuala Lumpur)

22 January	PKNS	1–3	Johor Darul Takzim	Shah Alam Stadium, Shah Alam, Selangor
20:45 UTC+08:00	Helmi Loussaief (yellow card) 50'; Faiz Isa 90+1'	Report	Safee Sali 19'; Ahmad Ezrie 61'; Daniel Güiza 87'

22 January	ATM	2–0	Felda United	Tuanku Abdul Rahman Stadium, Paroi, Negeri Sembilan
20:45 UTC+08:00	Marlon 16'; Affizie Faisal (yellow card) 44'; Bruno Martelotto (yellow card) 50'; Shukor Adan 56'		Júnior Pereira (yellow card) 32'	Referee: Wan Mohd Tarmizi Wan Ibrahim (Selangor)

=== Week 6 ===
15 February	Terengganu	2–0	Perak	Sultan Ismail Nasiruddin Shah Stadium, Kuala Terengganu, Terengganu
16:45 UTC+08:00	Ashaari Shamsuddin 13'; Effa Owona 46'; Ismail Faruqi (yellow card) 73'; Khairul Ramadhan (yellow card) 85'	Report	Rafiuddin Rodin (yellow card) 41'; Rafael (yellow card) 42'; Karim Rouani (yellow card) 73'; Khairi Kiman (yellow card) 88'

15 February	Selangor	2–0	Kelantan	Shah Alam Stadium, Shah Alam, Selangor
20:45 UTC+08:00	Nasriq Baharom (yellow card) 10'; Forkey Doe 13'; Ramez Dayoub 27'; S. Veenod (yellow card) 55'; Norazlan (yellow card) 81'; Shukur Jusoh (yellow card) 85'	Report	Shakir Shaari (yellow card) 41'	Referee: Mohd Zamzaidi Katimin (Melaka)

16 February	Felda United	1–3	PKNS	Petaling Jaya Stadium, Kelana Jaya, Selangor
16:45 UTC+08:00	Mohd Nizam (yellow card) 30' (yellow card) 32' (red card); Mohammed Ghaddar 33'; Rudie Ramli (yellow card) 42'; Júnior Pereira (yellow card) 63'	Report	Helmi Remeli 28'; Patrick Wleh 44'; Nazrin Syamsul 55'; Faiz Isa (yellow card) 75'	Referee: Azman Jamaludin

16 February	LionsXII	3–0	Pahang	Jalan Besar Stadium, Singapore
19:45 UTC+08:00	Faris Ramli 12'; Safirul Sulaiman (yellow card) 62'; Safuwan Baharudin 64'; Fazrul Nawaz 76'	Report	Saiful Nizam (yellow card) 42'	Attendance: 6,288

16 February	Johor Darul Takzim	1–0	T-Team	Tan Sri Dato Haji Hassan Yunos Stadium, Johor Bahru, Johor
20:45 UTC+08:00	Daniel Güiza 33'; Safiq Rahim (yellow card) 59'; Musleyadi (yellow card) 83'; Irfan Abdul Ghani (yellow card) 90+4'	Report	George Boateng (yellow card) 45'; Latiff Suhaimi (yellow card) 77'	Referee: Wan Mohammad Tarmizi Wan Ibrahim (Selangor)

16 February	Negeri Sembilan	1–1	ATM	Tuanku Abdul Rahman Stadium, Paroi, Negeri Sembilan
20:45 UTC+08:00	Rashid Mahmud (yellow card) 31'; Firdaus Azizul 34'; Eddy Helmi (yellow card) 63'; S. Sivanesan (yellow card) 64'; Abdul Halim (yellow card) 90+3'	Report	K. Reuben (yellow card) 83'; Norfazly Alias (yellow card) 36' (goal) 89'; Hairuddin (yellow card) 83'

=== Week 7 ===
19 February	T-Team	1–1	Felda United	Sultan Ismail Nasiruddin Shah Stadium, Kuala Terengganu, Terengganu
16:45 UTC+08:00	Abdul Latiff 62'	Report	Khairul Anuar 6'

19 February	PKNS	2–2	Negeri Sembilan	Shah Alam Stadium, Shah Alam, Selangor
20:45 UTC+08:00	Patrick Wleh 6' (pen.); Fauzan Dzulkifli 27'		Rashid Mahmud 12'; Shahurain 88'	Referee: Nazmi Nasarudin (Pulau Pinang)

19 February	Perak	1–0	Pahang	Lumut Stadium, Ipoh, Perak
20:45 UTC+08:00	Jalaluddin Jaafar 42' (o.g.)	Report		Referee: Suhaimi Mat Hassan (Terengganu)

19 February	Kelantan	2–0	Terengganu	Sultan Mohammad IV Stadium, Kota Bharu, Kelantan
20:45 UTC+08:00	Keita Mandjou 33', 65'	Report		Attendance: 15,000; Referee: Syed Azhar Syed Kamar (Kuala Lumpur)

19 February	Johor Darul Takzim	2–2	LionsXII	Tan Sri Dato Haji Hassan Yunos Stadium, Johor Bahru, Johor
20:45 UTC+08:00	Del Nero 12'; Norshahrul Idlan 81'	Report	Hariss Harun 4'; Baihakki Khaizan 38'	Referee: Nagor Amir Noor Mohamed

19 February	ATM	2–0	Selangor	Tuanku Abdul Rahman Stadium, Paroi, Negeri Sembilan
20:45 UTC+08:00	Bruno Martelotto 17'; Marlon 90' (pen.)	Report		Referee: Suhaizi Shukri (Melaka)

=== Week 8 ===
22 February	Felda United	0–0	Johor Darul Takzim	Petaling Jaya Stadium, Kelana Jaya, Selangor
16:45 UTC+08:00		Report		Referee: Mohd Zamzaidi Katimin (Melaka)

22 February	Negeri Sembilan	0–0	T-Team	Tuanku Abdul Rahman Stadium, Paroi, Negeri Sembilan
20:45 UTC+08:00				Referee: Teoh Hee Loon (Melaka)

22 February	Selangor	0–0	PKNS	Shah Alam Stadium, Shah Alam, Selangor
20:45 UTC+08:00

23 February	Terengganu	3–2	ATM	Sultan Ismail Nasiruddin Shah Stadium, Kuala Terengganu, Terengganu
16:45 UTC+08:00	Khairul Ramadhan 30'; Ashaari Shamsuddin 81', 90+5'	Report	Marlon 75'; Christie Jayaseelan 89'	Referee: Wan Mohd Tarmizi Wan Ibrahim (Selangor)

23 February	Pahang	2–2	Kelantan	Darulmakmur Stadium, Kuantan, Pahang
20:45 UTC+08:00	Hafiz Kamal 45+2'; Fauzi Roslan 85' (pen.)	Report	Norfarhan Muhammad 8'; Keita Mandjou 84'	Attendance: 39,955; Referee: Les Mostia Mohen Mohd Tisan (Negeri Sembilan)

6 April	LionsXII	2–1	Perak	Jalan Besar Stadium, Singapore
19:45 UTC+08:00	Shahril Ishak 8', 58'		Rafiuddin Roddin 90+1'

=== Week 9 ===
1 March	ATM	0–0	Pahang	Tuanku Abdul Rahman Stadium, Paroi, Negeri Sembilan
20:45 UTC+08:00		Report		Referee: Suhaizi Shukri (Melaka)

1 March	Kelantan	1–1	Perak	Sultan Mohammad IV Stadium, Kota Bharu, Kelantan
20:45 UTC+08:00	Keita Mandjou 88'	Report	Hadi Yahya 2'	Referee: Syed Azhar Syed Kamar

2 March	Felda United	0–0	LionsXII	Petaling Jaya Stadium, Kelana Jaya, Selangor
16:45 UTC+08:00				Referee: Suhaimi Mat Hassan (Terengganu)

2 March	PKNS	0–2	Terengganu	Shah Alam Stadium, Shah Alam, Selangor
20:45 UTC+08:00			Effa Owona 9'; Manaf Mamat 26'	Referee: Teoh Hee Loon (Melaka)

2 March	Johor Darul Takzim	2–1	Negeri Sembilan	Tan Sri Dato Haji Hassan Yunos Stadium, Johor Bahru, Johor
20:45 UTC+08:00	Kamarul Afiq 83'; Nurul Azwan Roya 90+1'	Report	Rashid Mahmud 29'	Attendance: 30,000; Referee: Samsuddin Ibrahim (Terengganu)

5 March	T-Team	0–0	Selangor	Sultan Ismail Nasiruddin Shah Stadium, Kuala Terengganu, Terengganu
16:45 UTC+08:00				Referee: Syed Azhar Syed Kamar

=== Week 10 ===
8 March	Terengganu	1–0	T-Team	Sultan Ismail Nasiruddin Shah Stadium, Kuala Terengganu, Terengganu
16:45 UTC+08:00	Farderin Kadir 90+2'	Report		Referee: Wan Mohd Tarmizi Wan Ibrahim (Selangor)

8 March	Perak	2–4	ATM	Lumut Stadium, Ipoh, Perak
20:45 UTC+08:00	Karim Rouani 11'; Shahrom Kalam 19'	Report	Shukor Adan 22'; Christie Jayaseelan 43'; Marlon 45+1', 85'	Referee: Nagor Amir Noor Mohamed

8 March	Pahang	1–3	PKNS	Darulmakmur Stadium, Kuantan, Pahang
20:45 UTC+08:00	R. Gopinathan 25'		Patrick Wleh 57', 90+'; Nizad Ayub 64'	Referee: Samsudin Ibrahim (Terengganu)

9 March	LionsXII	1–0	Kelantan	Jalan Besar Stadium, Singapore
19:45 UTC+08:00	Shahfiq Ghani 88'	Report

9 March	Negeri Sembilan	0–1	Felda United	Tuanku Abdul Rahman Stadium, Paroi, Negeri Sembilan
20:45 UTC+08:00			Razali Umar 41'	Referee: Suhaizi Shukri (Melaka)

9 March	Selangor	4–1	Johor Darul Takzim	Shah Alam Stadium, Shah Alam, Selangor
20:45 UTC+08:00	S. Kunanlan 4'; Forkey Doe 32'; Mahali 67'; Amri Yahyah 69'	Report	Norshahrul Idlan 75'	Attendance: 60,980; Referee: Mohd. Zamzaidi Katimin (Melaka)

=== Week 11 ===
29 March	Felda United	1–1	Selangor	Petaling Jaya Stadium, Kelana Jaya, Selangor
16:45 UTC+08:00	Júnior Pereira 25' (pen.)	Report	Amri Yahyah 28'	Referee: Teoh Hee Loon (Melaka)

29 March	ATM	2–3	Kelantan	Tuanku Abdul Rahman Stadium, Paroi, Negeri Sembilan
20:45 UTC+08:00	Marlon 53', 68'	Report	Indra Putra 28'; Keita Mandjou 33'; Norfarhan Muhammad 90+1'	Referee: Mohd. Zamzaidi Katimin (Melaka)

30 March	T-Team	1–3	Pahang	Sultan Ismail Nasiruddin Shah Stadium, Kuala Terengganu, Terengganu
16:45 UTC+08:00	Muinuddin Mokhtar 24'		Fauzi Roslan 43'; Faizol Hussein 83'; R. Gopinathan 85'

30 March	LionsXII	1–0	Negeri Sembilan	Jalan Besar Stadium, Singapore
19:45 UTC+08:00	Shahril Ishak 79'	Report		Referee: Amirul Izwan Yaakub (Perak)

30 March	PKNS	0–1	Perak	Shah Alam Stadium, Shah Alam, Selangor
20:45 UTC+08:00			Rafiuddin Rodin 75'	Referee: Les Mostia Mohen Mohd Tisan (Negeri Sembilan)

30 March	Johor Darul Takzim	3–2	Terengganu	Tan Sri Dato Haji Hassan Yunos Stadium, Johor Bahru, Johor
20:45 UTC+08:00	Daniel Güiza 36' (pen.), 45+2'; Nurul Azwan 49'		Effa Owona 10', 55'	Attendance: 30,000; Referee: Suhaizi Shukri (Melaka)

=== Week 12 ===
12 April	Terengganu	0–1	Johor Darul Takzim	Sultan Ismail Nasiruddin Shah Stadium, Kuala Terengganu, Terengganu
16:45 UTC+08:00		Report	Norshahrul 25'	Attendance: 15,000; Referee: Les Mostia Mohen Mohd Tisan (Negeri Sembilan)

12 April	Perak	2–2	PKNS	Lumut Stadium, Ipoh, Perak
20:45 UTC+08:00	Hadi Yahya 25'; Paulo Rangel 55'		Patrick Wleh 7', 74'

13 April	Negeri Sembilan	1–1	LionsXII	Tuanku Abdul Rahman Stadium, Paroi, Negeri Sembilan
20:45 UTC+08:00	Fabio Leandro 15'; Ghani Rahman (red card) 73'		Fazrul Nawaz 19'	Referee: Mohd. Zamzaidi Katimin (Melaka)

13 April	Selangor	2–0	Felda United	Shah Alam Stadium, Shah Alam, Selangor
20:45 UTC+08:00	K. Gurusamy 51'; Forkey Doe 82'		Ahmad Fauzi Saari (red card) 89'	Referee: Suhaimi Mat Hassan (Terengganu)

13 April	Pahang	2–1	T-Team	Darulmakmur Stadium, Kuantan, Pahang
20:45 UTC+08:00	R. Gopinathan 53'; Razman Roslan 62'		Azrul Hazran 83'	Referee: Syed Azhar Syed Kamar (Kuala Lumpur)

13 April	Kelantan	1–3	ATM	Sultan Mohammad IV Stadium, Kota Bharu, Kelantan
20:45 UTC+08:00	Faiz Subri 39'	Report	Hairuddin Omar 11'; Christie Jayaseelan 22'; Marlon 64'	Referee: Nagor Amir Noor Mohamed

=== Week 13 ===
19 April	PKNS	2–1	Kelantan	Shah Alam Stadium, Shah Alam, Selangor
20:45 UTC+08:00	Roman Chmelo 52'; Fauzan Dzulkifli 73'	Report	Fakri Saarani 7'

19 April	Negeri Sembilan	0–0	Selangor	Tuanku Abdul Rahman Stadium, Paroi, Negeri Sembilan
20:45 UTC+08:00				Referee: Suhaizi Shukri (Melaka)

19 April	Johor Darul Takzim	1–0	Pahang	Tan Sri Dato Haji Hassan Yunos Stadium, Johor Bahru, Johor
20:45 UTC+08:00	Leonel Núñez 46'	Report		Referee: Mohd Zamzaidi Katimin (Melaka)

20 April	Felda United	1–2	Terengganu	Petaling Jaya Stadium, Kelana Jaya, Selangor
16:45 UTC+08:00	Azrul Ahmad 54'		Faizal Muhammad 7'; G. Puaneswaran 85'	Referee: Amirul Izwan Yaakub (Perak)

20 April	T-Team	2–0	Perak	Sultan Ismail Nasiruddin Shah Stadium, Kuala Terengganu, Terengganu
16:45 UTC+08:00	Takhiyuddin Roslan 35'; Latiff Suhaimi 75'			Referee: Les Mostia Mohen Mohd Tisan (Negeri Sembilan)

20 April	LionsXII	3–1	ATM	Jalan Besar Stadium, Singapore
19:45 UTC+08:00	Shahfiq Ghani 28', 71'; Shahril Ishak 45+3' (pen.)	Report	Marlon 62'	Referee: Samsudin Ibrahim (Terengganu)

=== Week 14 ===
26 April	Terengganu	1–0	Negeri Sembilan	Sultan Ismail Nasiruddin Shah Stadium, Kuala Terengganu, Terengganu
16:45 UTC+08:00	Ashaari Shamsuddin 90+4' (pen.)			Attendance: 2,700; Referee: Teo Hee Loon

26 April	ATM	2–0	PKNS	Tuanku Abdul Rahman Stadium, Paroi, Negeri Sembilan
20:45 UTC+08:00	Hairuddin Omar 34'; Marlon 73'	Report		Attendance: 1,500; Referee: Shukri Abdul Rahman

26 April	Pahang	2–0	Felda United	Darulmakmur Stadium, Kuantan, Pahang
20:45 UTC+08:00	Matías Conti 25'; Fauzi Roslan 65'	Report		Attendance: 11,000; Referee: Suhaimi Mat Hassan (Terengganu)

27 April	Perak	3–0	Johor Darul Takzim	Lumut Stadium, Ipoh, Perak
20:45 UTC+08:00	Paulo Rangel 12', 66', 88'	Report		Attendance: 1,000; Referee: Suhaizi Shukri

27 April	Kelantan	3–1	T-Team	Sultan Mohammad IV Stadium, Kota Bharu, Kelantan
20:45 UTC+08:00	Dickson Nwakaeme 32' (pen.); Nor Farhan 60'; Indra Putra 90+2'	Report	Damir Ibrić 82' (pen.)	Attendance: 5,000; Referee: Amirul Izwan Yaakob

27 April	Selangor	0–0	LionsXII	Shah Alam Stadium, Shah Alam, Selangor
20:45 UTC+08:00				Attendance: 5,000; Referee: Nagor Amir Nor Mohamed

=== Week 15 ===
3 May	Felda United	3–1	Perak	Petaling Jaya Stadium, Kelana Jaya, Selangor
16:45 UTC+08:00	Leonel St-Preux 30'; Razali Umar 38'; Rudie Ramli 55'	Report	Paulo Rangel 44' (pen.)

3 May	T-Team	0–1	ATM	Sultan Ismail Nasiruddin Shah Stadium, Kuala Terengganu, Terengganu
16:45 UTC+08:00		Report	Venice Elphi 67'	Attendance: 1,000; Referee: Zamzaidi Katimin (Melaka)

22 May	Negeri Sembilan	0–2	Pahang	Tuanku Abdul Rahman Stadium, Paroi, Negeri Sembilan
20:45 UTC+08:00			Razman Roslan 39' (pen.); Damion Stewart 50'	Attendance: 3,000; Referee: Zulkifli Ahmad

22 May	Selangor	2–0	Terengganu	Shah Alam Stadium, Shah Alam, Selangor
20:45 UTC+08:00	Forkey Doe 24', 89'			Attendance: 3,000; Referee: Teoh Hee Loon

22 May	Johor Darul Takzim	2–0	Kelantan	Tan Sri Dato Haji Hassan Yunos Stadium, Johor Bahru, Johor
20:45 UTC+08:00	Norshahrul Idlan 66'; Nurul Azwan 69'			Attendance: 30,000; Referee: Zamzaidi Katimin

27 May	LionsXII	3–1	PKNS	Jalan Besar Stadium, Singapore
19:45 UTC+08:00	Hariss Harun 54'; Nazrul Nazari 59'; Khairul Nizam 89'		Patrick Wleh 90+1'

=== Week 16 ===
7 May	Terengganu	1–2	LionsXII	Sultan Ismail Nasiruddin Shah Stadium, Kuala Terengganu, Terengganu
16:45 UTC+08:00	Ismail Faruqi 64'	Report	Baihakki Khaizan 79'; Hasmizan 90+3' (o.g.)	Attendance: 2,300; Referee: Wan Mohd Tarmizi Wan Ibrahim (Selangor)

7 May	Perak	2–1	Negeri Sembilan	Perak Stadium, Ipoh, Perak
20:45 UTC+08:00	Paulo Rangel 22'; Azlan Ismail 62'	Report	Nazrin Nawi 90+4'	Attendance: 14,000; Referee: Zulkarnain Zakaria

7 May	PKNS	2–1	T-Team	Shah Alam Stadium, Shah Alam, Selangor
20:45 UTC+08:00	Nizad Ayub 12'; Roman Chmelo 70'		Damir Ibrić 47' (pen.)	Attendance: 100; Referee: Azman Jamalludin

7 May	Kelantan	3–0	Felda United	Sultan Mohammad IV Stadium, Kota Bharu, Kelantan
20:45 UTC+08:00	Indra Putra 33', 36'; Badhri Radzi 90+1'	Report		Attendance: 18,000; Referee: Zamzaidi Katimin (Melaka)

7 May	Pahang	2–2	Selangor	Darulmakmur Stadium, Kuantan, Pahang
20:45 UTC+08:00	R. Surendran 39', 90+1'	Report	Forkey Doe 3', 72'	Attendance: 17,500; Referee: Syed Azhar Syed Kamar (Kuala Lumpur)

7 May	ATM	2–0	Johor Darul Takzim	Tuanku Abdul Rahman Stadium, Paroi, Negeri Sembilan
20:45 UTC+08:00	Marlon 55', 64'	Report		Attendance: 3,000; Referee: Samsudin Ibrahim (Terengganu)

=== Week 17 ===
10 May	Selangor	1–1	Perak	Shah Alam Stadium, Shah Alam, Selangor
20:45 UTC+08:00	Raimi Nor 90+1'		Noor Hazrul 19'	Attendance: 6,000; Referee: Suhaizi Shukri (Melaka)

10 May	Negeri Sembilan	0–3	Kelantan	Tuanku Abdul Rahman Stadium, Paroi, Negeri Sembilan
20:45 UTC+08:00			Badhri Radzi 31'; Indra Putra 76'; Nor Farhan 82'	Attendance: 4,000; Referee: Teoh Hee Loon (Melaka)

11 May	Felda United	0–1	ATM	Petaling Jaya Stadium, Kelana Jaya, Selangor
16:45 UTC+08:00			Hairuddin Omar 10'	Referee: Sukri Abdul Rahman (Terengganu)

11 May	Terengganu	2–2	Pahang	Sultan Ismail Nasiruddin Shah Stadium, Kuala Terengganu, Terengganu
16:45 UTC+08:00	Khairul Ramadhan 11'; Manaf Mamat 65'		Faizol Hussien 55'; Malik Ariff 90+5'	Attendance: 2,600; Referee: Syed Azhar Syed Kamar (Kuala Lumpur)

11 May	LionsXII	3–0	T-Team	Jalan Besar Stadium, Singapore
19:45 UTC+08:00	Shahril Ishak 9'; Shakir Hamzah 28'; Fazrul Nawaz 34'			Attendance: 6,438; Referee: Kamal Ahmad (Kuala Lumpur)

11 May	Johor Darul Takzim	3–1	PKNS	Tan Sri Dato Haji Hassan Yunos Stadium, Johor Bahru, Johor
20:45 UTC+08:00	P. Gunalan 29' (o.g.); Norshahrul Idlan 42'; Nurul Azwan 85'		Patrick Wleh 50'	Attendance: 20,000; Referee: Zamzaidi Katimin (Melaka)

=== Week 18 ===
17 May	T-Team	1–2	Johor Darul Takzim	Sultan Ismail Nasiruddin Shah Stadium, Kuala Terengganu, Terengganu
16:45 UTC+08:00	Badrul Hisyam 33' (pen.)		Safee Sali 53'; Leonel Núñez 68'	Attendance: 1,300; Referee: Kamal Ahmad

17 May	Perak	1–3	Terengganu	Perak Stadium, Ipoh, Perak
20:45 UTC+08:00	Azlan Ismail 57'		Manaf Mamat 18'; Fakhrurazi Musa 66'; Khairul Ramadhan 89' (pen.)	Attendance: 7,000; Referee: Suhaizi Shukri

17 May	Pahang	1–1	LionsXII	Darulmakmur Stadium, Kuantan, Pahang
20:45 UTC+08:00	Azamuddin Akil 90+5'		Shahril Ishak 11'	Attendance: 15,000; Referee: Zamzaidi Katimin

18 May	PKNS	5–0	Felda United	Shah Alam Stadium, Shah Alam, Selangor
20:45 UTC+08:00	Fauzan Dzulkifli 34'; Khairu Azrin 45+1'; Patrick Wleh 49'; Roman Chmelo 59'; Nizad Ayub 89'			Attendance: 900; Referee: Teoh Hee Loon

18 May	ATM	1–2	Negeri Sembilan	Tuanku Abdul Rahman Stadium, Paroi, Negeri Sembilan
20:45 UTC+08:00	Hairuddin Omar 15'		Fauzi Nan 2'; Nazrin Nawi 21'	Attendance: 2,000; Referee: Azman Jamaluddin

18 May	Kelantan	1–1	Selangor	Sultan Muhammad IV Stadium, Kota Bharu, Kelantan
20:45 UTC+08:00	Zairo Anuar 65'		Adam Griffiths 54'	Attendance: 15,000; Referee: Syed Azhar Syed Kamar

=== Week 19 ===
21 June	Felda United	0–4	T-Team	Petaling Jaya Stadium, Kelana Jaya, Selangor
16:45 UTC+08:00			Latiff Suhaimi 6'; George Boateng 36'; Syuhiran Zainal 50'; Damir Ibrić 76'

21 June	Terengganu	0–4	Kelantan	Sultan Ismail Nasiruddin Shah Stadium, Kuala Terengganu, Terengganu
20:45 UTC+08:00			Badhri Radzi 13'; Dickson Nwakaeme 47'; Nor Farhan 50'; Faiz Subri 56'	Attendance: 8,500; Referee: Nafeez Abd Wahab

21 June	Selangor	2–1	ATM	Shah Alam Stadium, Shah Alam, Selangor
20:45 UTC+08:00	Amri Yahyah 40'; K. Gurusamy 90+2'		Bruno Martelotto 45+4' (pen.)	Attendance: 3,000; Referee: Shamsudin Ibrahim

22 June	LionsXII	1–1	Johor Darul Takzim	Jalan Besar Stadium
19:45 (UTC+8)	Safuwan Baharudin 83'		Leonel Núñez 10'	Attendance: 7,650; Referee: Zamzaidi Kartimin

22 June	Negeri Sembilan	0–1	PKNS	Tuanku Abdul Rahman Stadium, Paroi, Negeri Sembilan
20:45 UTC+08:00			Nazmi Faiz 18' (pen.)	Attendance: 1,000; Referee: Teoh Hee Loon

22 June	Pahang	1–2	Perak	Darulmakmur Stadium, Kuantan, Pahang
20:45 UTC+08:00	Hafiz Kamal 80'		Azlan Ismail 61'; Paulo Rangel 83'	Attendance: 20,000; Referee: Syed Azahar

=== Week 20 ===
25 June	Perak	1–1	LionsXII	Perak Stadium, Ipoh, Perak
20:45 UTC+08:00	Paulo Rangel 58'		Shahfiq Ghani 75'	Attendance: 10,000; Referee: Kamal Ahmad

25 June	Johor Darul Takzim	1–1	Felda United	Tan Sri Dato Haji Hassan Yunos Stadium, Johor Bahru, Johor
20:45 UTC+08:00	Haidin Azman 65'		Rudie Ramli 82'	Attendance: 12,000; Referee: Wan Mohd Tarmizi

25 June	PKNS	1–2	Selangor	Shah Alam Stadium, Shah Alam, Selangor
20:45 UTC+08:00	Nizad Ayub 14'		Raimi Mohd Nor 62', 69'	Attendance: 500; Referee: Azman Jamaludin

25 June	ATM	1–1	Terengganu	Tuanku Abdul Rahman Stadium, Paroi, Negeri Sembilan
20:45 UTC+08:00	Christie Jayaseelan 66'		Farderin Kadir 79'	Attendance: 1,000; Referee: Nafeez Abd Wahab

25 June	Kelantan	2–0	Pahang	Sultan Muhammad IV Stadium, Kota Bharu, Kelantan
20:45 UTC+08:00	Badri Radzi 45+1'; Zamri Ramli 56'			Referee: Shamsudin Ibrahim

25 June	T-Team	2–1	Negeri Sembilan	Sultan Ismail Nasiruddin Shah Stadium, Kuala Terengganu, Terengganu
20:45 UTC+08:00	Damir Ibrić 75' (pen.); George Boateng 85'		Shahurain 28'	Attendance: 300; Referee: Nazmi Nasaruddin

=== Week 21 ===
2 July	LionsXII	4–0	Felda United	Jalan Besar Stadium, Singapore
19:45 (UTC+8)	Azrul Ahmad 46' (o.g.); Shahril Ishak 57'; Fazrul Nawaz 61'; Shahfiq Ghani 83'			Attendance: 7,650; Referee: Samsudin Ibrahim

2 July	Perak	0–1	Kelantan	Perak Stadium, Ipoh, Perak
20:45 UTC+08:00			Indra Putra 83'	Attendance: 12,000; Referee: Nagor Amir

2 July	Terengganu	0–0	PKNS	Sultan Ismail Nasiruddin Shah Stadium, Kuala Terengganu, Terengganu
20:45 UTC+08:00				Attendance: 1,300; Referee: Nafeez Abd Wahab

2 July	Pahang	2–1	ATM	Darulmakmur Stadium, Kuantan, Pahang
20:45 UTC+08:00	Matías Conti 80'; R. Gopinathan 89'		Shukor Adan 90+3'	Attendance: 5,000; Referee: Zamzaidi Katimin

2 July	Selangor	4–1	T-Team	Shah Alam Stadium, Shah Alam, Selangor
20:45 UTC+08:00	Amri Yahyah 11', 69'; Nasriq Baharom 72'; Forkey Doe 83'		Latiff Suhaimi 23'	Attendance: 2,000; Referee: Syed Azhar

2 July	Negeri Sembilan	0–2	Johor Darul Takzim	Tuanku Abdul Rahman Stadium, Paroi, Negeri Sembilan
20:45 UTC+08:00			Jasazrin Jamaluddin 26'; Nurul Azwan Roya 70'	Attendance: 2,500; Referee: Teoh Hee Loon

=== Week 22 ===
6 July	Felda United	2–1	Negeri Sembilan	National Stadium, Bukit Jalil, Selangor
16:45 UTC+08:00	Rudie Ramli 16'; Riduwan Ma'on 90+1'		Eddy Helmi 52'	Referee: Samsudin Ibrahim (Terengganu)

6 July	T-Team	2–2	Terengganu	Sultan Ismail Nasiruddin Shah Stadium, Kuala Terengganu, Terengganu
20:45 UTC+08:00	Damir Ibrić 13'; Ahmad Syamim 60'		Nasril Izzat 37'; Fakhrurazi Musa 52'	Attendance: 400; Referee: Nagor Amir

6 July	PKNS	4–5	Pahang	Shah Alam Stadium, Shah Alam, Selangor
20:45 UTC+08:00	Patrick Wleh 34', 71', 81', 90+3'		Amirul Hadi 11'; R. Gopinathan 20'; Matías Conti 44' (pen.); Faizol Hussien 49'; Helmi Remeli 55' (o.g.)	Referee: Nazmi Nasarudin (Pulau Pinang)

6 July	ATM	0–1	Perak	Tuanku Abdul Rahman Stadium, Paroi, Negeri Sembilan
20:45 UTC+08:00			Paulo Rangel 79' (pen.)	Attendance: 850; Referee: Nafeez Abd Wahab

6 July	Kelantan	2–0	LionsXII	Sultan Muhammad IV Stadium, Kota Bharu, Kelantan
20:45 UTC+08:00	Badhri Radzi 6'; Dickson Nwakaeme 58'			Referee: Suhaimi Mat Hassan

6 July	Johor Darul Takzim	1–1	Selangor	Tan Sri Dato Haji Hassan Yunos Stadium, Johor Bahru, Johor
20:45 UTC+08:00	Leonel Núñez 22'		Forkey Doe 51'	Attendance: 30,000; Referee: Syed Azhar

== Fixtures and results ==
Home \ Away	ATM	FEL	JDT	KEL	NSE	PHG	PRK	PKN	SEL	LNS	TRG	TTE
ATM		2–0	2–0	2–3	1–2	0–0	0–1	2–0	2–0	0–1	1–1	3–0
Felda United	0–1		0–0	0–0	2–1	0–1	3–1	1–3	1–1	0–0	1–2	0–4
Johor Darul Ta'zim	2–2	1–1		2–0	2–1	1–0	1–0	3–1	1–1	2–2	3–2	1–0
Kelantan	1–3	3–0	1–1		0–0	2–0	1–1	2–1	1–1	2–0	2–0	3–1
Negeri Sembilan	1–1	0–1	0–2	0–3		0–2	0–1	0–1	0–0	1–1	0–0	0–0
Pahang	2–1	2–0	3–2	2–2	2–1		1–2	1–3	2–2	1–1	3–0	2–1
Perak	2–4	0–1	3–0	0–1	2–1	1–0		2–2	1–1	1–1	1–3	1–0
PKNS	1–3	5–0	1–3	2–1	2–2	4–5	0–1		1–2	1–0	0–2	2–1
Selangor	2–1	2–0	4–1	2–0	1–0	3–2	1–1	0–0		0–0	2–0	4–1
LionsXII	3–1	4–0	1–1	1–0	1–0	3–0	2–1	3–1	1–0		2–1	3–0
Terengganu	3–2	1–1	0–1	0–4	1–0	2–2	2–0	0–0	1–2	1–2		1–0
T–Team	0–1	1–1	1–2	1–0	2–1	1–3	2–0	0–3	0–0	1–0	2–2	

Updated to match(es) played on 6 July 2013. Source: Liga Super
Legend: Blue = home team win; Yellow = draw; Red = away team win.

== Season statistics ==
=== Top scorers ===
As of 6 July 2013

Rank	Player	Club	Goals
1	(Saint Vincent and the Grenadines) Marlon Alex James	ATM	16
2	(Liberia) Patrick Ronaldinho Wleh	PKNS	14
3	(Liberia) Francis Forkey Doe	Selangor	10
4	(Brazil) Paulo Rangel	Perak	9
5	(Singapore) Shahril Ishak	LionsXII	8
5	(Malaysia) Mohd Fauzi Roslan	Pahang	8
5	(Malaysia) Mohd Amri Yahyah	Selangor	8
8	(Malaysia) Norshahrul Idlan Talaha	Johor Darul Takzim	7
9	(Spain) Daniel Güiza	Johor Darul Takzim	6
9	(Malaysia) Indra Putra Mahayuddin	Kelantan	6
9	(Malaysia) Mohd Nor Farhan Muhammad	Kelantan	6
9	(Malaysia) Mohd Badhri Mohd Radzi	Kelantan	6
9	(Cameroon) Jean-Emmanuel Effa Owona	Terengganu	6

=== Own goals ===
Rank	Player	For	Club	Own Goal
1	Nuraliff Zainal Abidin	Perak	T-Team	1
1	Jalaluddin Jaafar	Perak	Pahang	1
1	Hasmizan Kamarodin	LionsXII	Terengganu	1
1	P. Gunalan	Johor Darul Takzim	PKNS	1
1	Mohd Azrul Ahmad	LionsXII	Felda United	1
1	Mohd Helmi Remeli	Pahang	PKNS	1

=== Hat-tricks ===
Player	For	Against	Result	Date
Marlon Alex James	ATM	PKNS	3–1	12 January 2013
Paulo Rangel	Perak	Johor Darul Takzim	3–0	27 April 2013
Patrick Wleh^{4}	PKNS	Pahang	4–5	6 July 2013

- ^{4} Player scored 4 goals

=== Scoring ===
- First goal of the season: Mohammed Ghaddar for Felda United against Terengganu (8 January 2013)
- Fastest goal of the season: 2 Minutes – Abdul Hadi Yahya for Perak against Kelantan (1 March 2013)
- Largest winning margin: 5 goals
  - PKNS 5–0 Felda United (18 May 2013)
- Highest scoring game: 9 goals
  - PKNS 4–5 Pahang (6 July 2013)
- Most goals scored in a match by a single team: 5 goals
  - PKNS 5–0 Felda United (18 May 2013)
  - PKNS 4–5 Pahang (6 July 2013)
- Most goals scored in a match by a losing team: 4 goals
  - PKNS 4–5 Pahang (6 July 2013)

== Awards ==
=== Monthly awards ===
Month	Coach of the Month		Player of the Month		Reference
Month	Coach	Club	Player	Club	Reference
January	Dollah Salleh	Pahang	Mohd Fauzi Roslan	Pahang	
February	E. Elavarasan	Terengganu	Ashaari Shamsuddin	Terengganu	
March	V. Sundramoorthy	LionsXII	Mahali Jasuli	Selangor	
April	V. Sundramoorthy	LionsXII	Shahril Ishak	LionsXII	
May	Irfan Bakti	Selangor	Nurul Azwan Roya	Darul Takzim	
June	Eduardo Almeida	T-Team	Badhri Radzi	Kelantan	
July	Bojan Hodak	Kelantan	Amri Yahyah	Selangor	

== See also ==
- List of Liga Super seasons
- 2013 Liga Premier
- 2013 Liga FAM
- 2013 Piala FA
- 2013 Piala Malaysia
