= 2018 Perak TBG F.C. season =

Perak TBG
2018 season
- President: Dato' Seri Abdul Puhat Mat Nayan
- Manager: Shahrul Azhar
- Head coach: Mehmet Duraković
- Stadium: Naval Base Stadium (interim); Perak Stadium
- Malaysia Super League: 2nd
- Malaysia FA Cup: Quarter-finals
- Malaysia Cup: Champions
- Top goalscorer: League: Gilmar (11); All: Gilmar (21)
Home colours	Away colours

The 2018 season was Perak The Bos Gaurus Football Club's 15th consecutive season in Malaysia Super League. The team participated in Malaysia Super League, the Malaysia FA Cup, and the Malaysia Cup.

== Squad information ==
=== First-team squad ===
As of 4 February 2018

No.	Name	Nat	Position(s)	Since	Date of birth (age)	Signed from
Goalkeepers
1	Nasrullah Aziz	(Malaysia)	GK	2018	17 December 1997 (age 28)	Youth system
18	Khairul Amri	(Malaysia)	GK	2017	22 December 1989 (age 36)	(Malaysia) Penang
22	Hafizul Hakim (vice-captain)	(Malaysia)	GK	2016	30 March 1993 (age 32)	(Malaysia) Melaka United
Defenders
2	Syazwan Zaipol	(Malaysia)	CB	2015	24 February 1995 (age 30)	Youth system
3	Shahrul Saad (vice-captain)	(Malaysia)	CB, DM	2016	8 July 1993 (age 32)	(Malaysia) Felda United
5	Jad Noureddine	(Lebanon)	CB	2018	27 February 1992 (age 33)	(Lebanon) Al-Safa'
6	Rafiq Faez	(Malaysia)	CB	2018	21 March 1993 (age 32)	Free Agent
15	Idris Ahmad	(Malaysia)	CB	2017	5 May 1990 (age 35)	(Malaysia) Felda United
17	Rizal Aziz	(Malaysia)	LB	2018	19 March 1996 (age 29)	Youth system
21	Nazirul Naim	(Malaysia)	LB	2016	6 April 1993 (age 32)	(Malaysia) Harimau Muda
23	Amirul Azhan	(Malaysia)	RB	2016	23 July 1993 (age 32)	Youth system
24	Shatiya Kandasamy	(Malaysia)	CB	2017	29 January 1990 (age 36)	(Malaysia) DRB-Hicom
25	Rafiuddin Roddin	(Malaysia)	LB, LW	2018	22 August 1989 (age 36)	(Malaysia) Penang
Midfielders
4	Nasir Basharudin (captain)	(Malaysia)	RW, DM	2010	29 March 1990 (age 35)	Youth system
7	Khairil Anuar	(Malaysia)	RW, LW	2015	8 March 1995 (age 30)	Youth system
8	Leandro	(Brazil)	DM	2017	29 October 1986 (age 39)	(Brazil) Luverdense
10	Wander Luiz	(Brazil)	AM, FW	2018	30 May 1987 (age 38)	(Saudi Arabia) Al-Raed
11	Brendan Gan	(Malaysia)	DM, AM	2018	3 June 1988 (age 37)	Free Agent
12	Kenny Pallraj	(Malaysia)	DM	2016	21 April 1993 (age 32)	(Malaysia) Harimau Muda
19	Nor Hakim	(Malaysia)	RW, LW	2018	2 October 1991 (age 34)	(Malaysia) T-Team
20	Nazrin Nawi	(Malaysia)	LW	2017	7 February 1988 (age 38)	(Malaysia) Johor Darul Ta'zim
27	Hafiz Kamal	(Malaysia)	AM, DM	2017	9 July 1987 (age 38)	(Malaysia) Selangor
Forwards
9	Gilmar	(Brazil)	ST	2017	28 November 1988 (age 37)	(Brazil) Boa Esporte
13	Asyraf Sahizah	(Malaysia)	ST	2018	8 March 1994 (age 31)	Free Agent
30	Nizad Ayub	(Malaysia)	ST	2017	30 August 1988 (age 37)	(Malaysia) Ministry of Finance

=== Coaching staff ===
Position	Staff
First-team manager	(Malaysia) Ahmad Shahrul Azhar Sofian
Assistant manager	(Malaysia) Dato' Rashidi Ibrahim
Head coach	(Australia) Mehmet Durakovic
Assistant coach	(Malaysia) Shahril Nizam Khalil
Goalkeeping coach	(Malaysia) Mohd Hamsani Ahmad
Fitness coach	(Malaysia) Sam Pakiaraj a/l Victor Davaraj
Physiotherapist	(Malaysia) Mohd Zainuddin Zakariar
Media Officer	(Malaysia) Mohd Azizi Rajab
Safety Officer	(Malaysia) Roslan Khan Md Sharif
Sport Masseur	(Malaysia) Mohd Izwan Sudin
Sport Masseur	(Malaysia) Mohd Syazrin Ahmad
Kitman	(Malaysia) Ahmad Helmi Ahmad Jamal
Kitman	(Malaysia) Mohd Fahmi Abdul Aziz

== Management team ==
=== Club personnel ===
Under new management, the Presidency was taken over by the Secretary General State of Perak, Yang Berhormat Dato' Seri Abdul Puhat Mat Nayan on 4 October 2015.

Position	Name
President	(Malaysia) YB Dato' Seri Abdul Puhat Mat Nayan
Deputy President	(Malaysia) Dato' Shahrul Zaman Yahya
Vice-Presidents	(Malaysia) Datuk Muhammad Yadzan Mohammad
Vice-Presidents	(Malaysia) Datuk G. Irudianathan
Treasurer	(Malaysia) Khairul Azwan Dato' Harun
Executive Committee Members	(Malaysia) Reduan Amir Hamzah
Executive Committee Members	(Malaysia) Mahhadee Ramlee
Executive Committee Members	(Malaysia) Mohd Rizairi Jamaludin
Executive Committee Members	(Malaysia) Zainal Anuar Abdul Rashid
Executive Committee Members	(Malaysia) Mohd Jamil Zakaria
Executive Committee Members	(Malaysia) Abdul Jamil Othman
Executive Committee Members	(Malaysia) Johari Baharom
Executive Committee Members	(Malaysia) Jurij Jamaludin
Executive Committee Members	(Malaysia) Najib Mokhtar

== Pre-season and friendlies ==
6 January 2018 Friendly	Felcra	1–5	Perak	Kuala Lumpur
20:45				Stadium: Arena UM

9 January 2018 Friendly	MOF	1–4	Perak	Serdang
16:45				Stadium: UPM Sports Centre

13 January 2018 Friendly	Kuantan	1–2	Perak	Bangi
21:00				Stadium: UKM Stadium

20 January 2018 Friendly	Perak	3–0	UiTM	Lumut
21:00				Stadium: TLDM Stadium

== Competitions ==
=== Overview ===
Competition	Record								Started round	Current position / round	Final position / round	First match	Last match
Competition	P	W	D	L	GF	GA	GD	Win %	Started round	Current position / round	Final position / round	First match	Last match
Super League	22	10	6	6	35	27	+8	45.45	–	2nd	2nd	3 February 2018	28 July 2018
FA Cup	4	2	1	1	9	6	+3	50.00	Second Round	Quarter-finals	Quarter-finals	3 March 2018	21 April 2018
Malaysia Cup	11	6	3	2	21	12	+9	54.55	Group Stage	Champions	Champions	4 August 2018	27 October 2018
Total	37	18	10	9	65	45	+20	48.65					

Updated to match played 27 October 2018
Source: Super League fixtures and results

=== Malaysia Super League ===
==== League table ====
Pos	Team	Pld	W	D	L	GF	GA	GD	Pts	Qualification or relegation
1	Johor Darul Ta'zim (C)	22	19	2	1	47	9	+38	59	Qualification for the AFC Champions League group stage
2	Perak	22	10	6	6	35	27	+8	36	Qualification for the AFC Champions League second preliminary round
3	PKNS	22	10	5	7	37	29	+8	35	
4	Pahang	22	9	7	6	35	21	+14	34	
5	Terengganu	22	10	4	8	32	31	+1	34	

Source: FAM, FMLLP
Rules for classification: 1) Points; 2) Goal difference; 3) Number of goals scored.
(C) Champions

==== Results by matchday ====
Matchday	1	2	3	4	5	6	7	8	9	10	11	12	13	14	15	16	17	18	19	20	21	22
Ground	A	A	H	A	H	A	H	A	H	H	A	H	A	A	H	A	H	H	H	A	H	A
Result	D	W	L	L	W	W	W	W	W	D	L	W	L	D	W	D	W	L	D	W	D	L
Position	8	3	7	9	6	4	3	3	2	2	2	2	3	3	2	2	2	2	2	2	2	2

Updated to match(es) played on 29 July 2018. Source: Matches
A = Away; H = Home; W = Win; D = Draw; L = Loss

==== Matches ====
Win Draw Loss Postponed

4 February 2018 1	Pahang	0–0	Perak	Kuantan
21:00 UTC+8		Report	Brendan (yellow card) 34'	Stadium: Darul Makmur Stadium

7 February 2018 2	Kedah	1–3	Perak	Alor Setar
21:00 UTC+8	Rizal (yellow card) 45+5'; Liridon (yellow card) 76' (yellow-red card) 82'; Sandro 80' (pen.); Syazwan T. (yellow card) 86'; Akram (yellow card) 90+1'	Report	Azhan (yellow card) 12'; Gilmar 21'; Leandro (yellow card) 45+3'; Cornthwaite (yellow card) 79', (goal) 87'; Kenny (yellow card) 90+3'; Nazirul 90+5'	Stadium: Darul Aman Stadium

10 February 2018 3	Perak	0–2	PKNS	Lumut
21:00 UTC+8	Kenny (yellow card) 34'; Shahrul (yellow card) 68'	Report	Ramazotti 30', 62'; Anderson (yellow card) 45'; Rodney (yellow card) 71'; Gurusamy (yellow card) 90+5'	Stadium: Naval Base Stadium

24 February 2018 4	Kelantan	3–2	Perak	Kota Bharu
16:45 MYT	Dong 68', 77', 88', (yellow card) 89'; Ghaddar (yellow card) 90+1'; Fahmi (yellow card) 90+1'	Report	Hakim 22'; Wander Luiz 69'; Khairil (yellow card) 90+1'	Stadium: Sultan Muhammad IV Stadium; Attendance: 5,381; Referee: Fitri Maskon

11 March 2018 5	Perak	3–0	Selangor	Lumut
16:45 UTC+8	Ashmawi 23' (o.g.); Kenny 35'; Gilmar (yellow card) 45', (goal) 45+2'; Nazrin (yellow card) 76'	Report	Joseph (yellow card) 11'; Pacheco (yellow card) 74' (yellow-red card) 85'	Stadium: Naval Base Stadium; Referee: Suhaimi Mat Hassan

15 April 2018 6	PKNP	1–2	Perak	Batu Kawan
21:00 UTC+8	Raffi (yellow card) 31'; Ezanie (yellow card) 49'; Fadhi (yellow card) 78'; Shahrel 81'	Report	Wander Luiz 20'; Nasir 24'	Stadium: Penang State Stadium; Referee: Muhd Rahmat Jantan

29 April 2018 7	Perak	3–0	Kuala Lumpur	Ipoh
21:00 UTC+8	Leandro 27' (pen.); Wander Luiz 65'; Gilmar 73'	Report	Firdaus (yellow card) 28'; Zhafri (yellow card) 37'; Achmad Jufriyanto (yellow card) 60'	Stadium: Perak Stadium; Referee: Suhaimi Mat Hassan

2 May 2018 8	Melaka United	1–2	Perak	Krubong
21:00 UTC+8	Faizal (yellow card) 45+2'; Chanturu (yellow card) 64'; Zubovich 79'	Report	Wander Luiz 45+4' (pen.); Gilmar 56'; Khairil (yellow card) 82'; Hakim (yellow card) 90+1'	Stadium: Hang Jebat Stadium; Referee: Khairul Azuan Kidam

6 May 2018 9	Perak	3–2	Terengganu	Ipoh
21:00 UTC+8	Wander Luiz 5'; Gilmar 13', 38'; Azhan (yellow card) 29'	Report	Cornthwaite 19' (o.g.); Azi Shahril (yellow card) 70'; Lee Tuck 79' (pen.)	Stadium: Perak Stadium; Referee: Nagor Amir Noor Mohamed

12 May 2018 10	Perak	0–0	Melaka United	Ipoh
21:00 UTC+8	Leandro (yellow card) 59'; Azhan (yellow card) 78'	Report	Khair (yellow card) 45+1'; Zubovich (yellow card) 45+3'; Fahmi (yellow card) 81'	Stadium: Perak Stadium; Referee: Wan Mohamad Tarmizi

22 May 2018 11	Terengganu	2–0	Perak	Kuala Terengganu
22:00 UTC+8	Thierry Bin (yellow card) 22'; Tchétché 26' (pen.), 52'; Tuck (yellow card) 45+2'; Azraie (yellow card) 61'	Report	Rafiuddin (yellow card) 25'	Stadium: Sultan Ismail Nasiruddin Shah Stadium; Referee: Razlan Jeffri Ali

26 May 2018 12	Perak	4–3	PKNP	Ipoh
22:00 UTC+8	Hakim 9'; Azhan (yellow card) 41'; Nasir 76'; Wander Luiz 84'; Gilmar 90+7'	Report	Anzité 34'; Sukri (yellow card) 54'; Syamim 60', (yellow card) 66'; Norakim 68'; Fadhil (yellow card) 90+2'	Stadium: Perak Stadium; Referee: Nazmi Nasaruddin

2 June 2018 13	Johor Darul Ta'zim	2–0	Perak	Johor Bahru
22:00 UTC+8	Márquez 5' (pen.); Hazwan (yellow card) 44'; Jorge Silva 84'	Report	Brendan (yellow card) 77'	Stadium: Tan Sri Dato Haji Hassan Yunos Stadium; Referee: Suhaimi Mat Hassan

6 June 2018 14	Negeri Sembilan	1–1	Perak	Paroi
22:00 UTC+8	Aizulridzwan (yellow card) 64'; Alex Moraes (yellow card) 81'; Thanabalan 90+6'	Report	Gilmar (yellow card) 39', (goal) 73'	Stadium: Tuanku Abdul Rahman; Referee: Nazmi Nasaruddin

9 June 2018 15	Perak	2–0	Negeri Sembilan	Ipoh
22:00 UTC+8	Leandro (yellow card) 45+2', (goal) 89'; Brendan 56'; Gilmar (yellow card) 67'	Report	Nasriq (yellow card) 84'	Stadium: Perak Stadium; Referee: Fitri Maskon

19 June 2018 16	Selangor	1–1	Perak	Kuala Lumpur
21:00 UTC+8	Amri 82'	Report	Alfonso 43' (o.g.)	Stadium: KLFA Stadium; Referee: Nazmi Nasaruddin

26 June 2018 17	Perak	1–0	Kelantan	Ipoh
21:00 UTC+8	Leandro 70' (pen.)	Report	Haziq (yellow card) 27'; Danial (yellow card) 35'	Stadium: Perak Stadium; Referee: Nagor Amir Noor Mohamed

10 July 2018 18	Perak	1–2	Johor Darul Ta'zim	Ipoh
21:00 UTC+8	Leandro (yellow card) 54'; Hakim 72'	Report	Hazwan (yellow card) 33'; Syamer (yellow card) 41'; Hariss 76'; Safawi 84', (yellow card) 84'; Insa (yellow card) 90+2'	Stadium: Perak Stadium; Referee: Zulkarnain Zakaria

14 July 2018 19	Perak	1–1	Pahang	Ipoh
21:00 UTC+8	Hakim 25'; Nazirul (yellow card) 37'; Kenny (yellow card) 75'	Report	Sumareh (yellow card) 8'; Norshahrul 17'; Davies (yellow card) 77'	Stadium: Perak Stadium; Referee: Nagor Amir Noor Mohamed

18 July 2018 20	Kuala Lumpur	1–5	Perak	Cheras
21:00 UTC+8	Firdaus (yellow card) 9' de Paula 46'; Afiq (yellow card) 85'; Irfan (yellow card) 90+3'	Report	Gilmar 7', 90+5' (pen.); Wander Luiz 11', (yellow card) 45+3'; Hakim 17'; Nazrin 36'; Leandro (yellow card) 39'	Stadium: KLFA Stadium; Referee: Fitri Maskon

22 July 2018 21	Perak	0–0	Kedah	Ipoh
21:00 UTC+8	Idris (yellow card) 45'; Syazwan (yellow card) 67'	Report	Zafuan (yellow card) 79'	Stadium: Perak Stadium; Referee: Mohd Nafeez Abdul Wahab

28 July 2018 22	PKNS	4–1	Perak	Shah Alam
21:00 UTC+8	Matos 3', 79'; Ramazotti 40'; Zarif (yellow card) 44'; Jafri (yellow card) 45'; Mahali (yellow card) 81'; Morales 90+4'	Report	Gilmar 11'; Kenny (yellow card) 53'; Leandro (yellow card) 55'	Stadium: Shah Alam Stadium; Referee: Nazmi Nasaruddin

=== Malaysia FA Cup ===
3 March 2018 Second Round	Perak	3–1	Sarawak	Lumut, Perak
21:00 UTC+8	Wander Luiz 13'; Gilmar 39', 84'	Report	Roskam 7'	Stadium: TLDM Stadium; Referee: Suresh Jayaparam

17 March 2018 Third Round	Penang	1–3	Perak	Batu Kawan, Penang
21:00 UTC+8	Wander Luiz 18', 79'; Gilmar (yellow card) 53', (goal) 79'	Report	Jasazrin (yellow card) 36'; Ilsø (yellow card) 61'; Ugo Ukah (yellow card) 75', (goal) 89' (pen.)	Stadium: Penang State Stadium; Referee: Razlan Jeffri Ali

7 April 2018 Quarter-final First leg	PKNS	2–1	Perak	Shah Alam, Selangor
21:00 UTC+8	Faris 25'; Azmizi (yellow card) 50'; Mahali (yellow card) 74'; Safee 89'	Report	Shahrul (yellow card) 32'; Wander Luiz 90+7' (pen.)	Stadium: Shah Alam Stadium; Referee: Fitri Maskon

21 April 2018 Quarter-final Second leg	Perak	2–2	PKNS	Ipoh, Perak
21:00 UTC+8	Hakim 73'; Nasir 82'	Report	Gurusamy (yellow card) 28', (goal) 64' (pen.); Akwensivie 55'; Safee (yellow card) 90+5'	Stadium: Perak Stadium; Referee: Suresh Jayaraman

=== Malaysia Cup ===
==== Group stage ====
Pos	Team	Pld	W	D	L	GF	GA	GD	Pts	Qualification	TER	PRK	FLC	KL
1	Terengganu	6	3	1	2	18	12	+6	10	Advance to knockout stage	—	1–2	2–2	2–3
2	Perak	6	3	1	2	9	7	+2	10	Advance to knockout stage	3–4	—	0–0	1–0
3	Felcra	6	2	2	2	10	14	−4	8		1–4	2–1	—	1–4
4	Kuala Lumpur	6	2	0	4	11	15	−4	6		1–5	0–2	3–4	—

Updated to match(es) played on 15 September 2018. Source: FAM FMLLP

4 August 2018 1	Perak	0–0	Felcra	Ipoh
21:00 UTC+8	Idris (yellow card) 12'	Report	Alif (yellow card) 8'; Fandi (yellow card) 8' (yellow-red card) 83'; Casagrande (yellow card) 51'; Endrick (yellow card) 53'	Stadium: Perak Stadium; Referee: Suresh Jayaraman

11 August 2018 2	Perak	3–4	Terengganu	Ipoh
21:00 UTC+8	Leandro (yellow card) 33', (goal) 90+5' (pen.); Brendan (yellow card) 57'; Wander 86', 90'	Report	Ashari 8'; Tuck (yellow card) 32' (red card) 71', (goal) 45+5' (pen.); Amirzafran (yellow card) 51', (goal) 57'; Faiz 82'	Stadium: Perak Stadium

19 August 2018 3	Kuala Lumpur	0–2	Perak	KLFA Stadium, Cheras
21:00 UTC+8		Report	Jad 41'; Gilmar 61'	Referee: Razlan Joffri Ali

25 August 2018 4	Perak	1–0	Kuala Lumpur	Penang State Stadium, Batu Kawan
21:00 UTC+8		Report	Nasir 19'	Referee: Fitri Maskon

2 September 2018 5	Terengganu	1–2	Perak	Sultan Ismail Nasiruddin Shah Stadium, Kuala Terengganu
21:00 UTC+8	Ashari Samsudin 65'	Report	Gilmar 21', 87'	Referee: Mohd Nafeez Abd Wahab

15 September 2018 6	Felcra	2–1	Perak	KLFA Stadium, Cheras
21:00 UTC+8	Abdul Hadi 38'; Azim Rahim 78'		Gilmar 75'

==== Knock-stage ====
25 September 2018 Quarter-finals first leg	Perak	0–0	PKNS	Perak Stadium, Ipoh
21:00 UTC+8		Report		Referee: Suhaizi Shukri

30 September 2018 Quarter-final second leg	PKNS	0–2	Perak	Shah Alam Stadium, Shah Alam
21:00UTC+8		Report	Wander 23', 57'	Referee: Nagor Amir Noor Mohamed

7 October 2018 Semi-finals first leg	Perak	5–0	Sabah	Perak Stadium, Ipoh
21:00 UTC+8		Report		Referee: Zamzaidi Katimin

21 October 2018 Semi-final second leg	Sabah	2–2	Perak	Likas Stadium, Sabah
20:15UTC+8	Sabri Sahar 34'; Rawilson 85'	Report	Gilmar 74', 81'	Referee: Suhaizi Shukri

27 October 2018 Final	Terengganu	3-3 (1–4 p)	Perak	Shah Alam Stadium, Shah Alam
21:00 UTC+8	Kipré Tchétché 1', 42'; Igor Zonjić (yellow card) 59'; Lee Tuck (yellow card) 66' (yellow-red card); Faiz Nasir 96'	Report	Wander Luiz (yellow card) 35'; Firdaus Saiyadi 47'; Gilmar (yellow card) 56' (yellow-red card); Brendan Gan 90+1'; Igor Zonjić (Own Goal) 120+1'; Leandro (yellow card) 120+1'	Attendance: 75,000; Referee: Suresh Jayaraman
	Penalties
	Igor Zonjić (penalty missed); Thierry Bin (penalty missed); Nasrullah Haniff (penalty scored)		(penalty scored) Wander Luiz; (penalty scored) Amirul Azhan; (penalty scored) Shahrul Saad; (penalty scored) Leandro

== Statistics ==
=== Appearances and goals ===
No.	Pos.	Name	League		FA Cup		Malaysia Cup		Total		Discipline	
No.	Pos.	Name	Apps	Goals	Apps	Goals	Apps	Goals	Apps	Goals	Yellow card	Red card
1	GK	(Malaysia) Nasrullah Aziz	0	0	0	0	0	0	0	0	0	0
2	DF	(Malaysia) Syazwan Zaipol	2(4)	0	0	0	1	0	3(4)	0	1	0
3	DF	(Malaysia) Shahrul Saad	19	0	3	0	8	0	30	0	4	0
4	MF	(Malaysia) Nasir Basharudin	15(3)	3	4	1	4(1)	1	23(4)	5	0	0
5	DF	(Lebanon) Jad Noureddine	8	0	0	0	4	1	12	1	0	0
6	DF	(Malaysia) Rafiq Faeez	0	0	0	0	0	0	0	0	0	0
7	MF	(Malaysia) Khairil Anuar	1(14)	0	0(4)	0	1(4)	0	2(22)	0	3	0
8	MF	(Brazil) Leandro	20	3	3	0	10	2	33	5	10	0
9	FW	(Brazil) Gilmar	20	11	4	3	11	7	35	21	6	1
10	MF	(Brazil) Wander Luiz	22	7	4	4	10	5	36	16	1	0
11	MF	(Malaysia) Brendan Gan	12(1)	1	1	0	10	1	23(1)	2	3	0
12	MF	(Malaysia) Kenny Pallraj	10(4)	1	3	0	2(5)	0	15(9)	1	4	0
13	FW	(Malaysia) Asyraf Sahizah	0(1)	0	0	0	0	0	(0)1	0	0	0
14	MF	(Malaysia) Firdaus Saiyadi	0	0	0	0	7(1)	2	7(1)	2	1	0
15	DF	(Malaysia) Idris Ahmad	8(2)	0	1	0	9(1)	0	18(3)	0	2	0
17	FW	(Malaysia) Rizal Aziz	0(1)	0	0	0	0	0	0(1)	0	0	0
18	GK	(Malaysia) Khairul Amri	2	0	0	0	1	0	3	0	0	0
19	MF	(Malaysia) Nor Hakim	21	5	4	1	10	1	35	7	1	0
20	MF	(Malaysia) Nazrin Nawi	2(15)	1	3(3)	0	0(2)	0	5(20)	1	1	0
21	DF	(Malaysia) Nazirul Naim	21	1	4	0	10	0	35	1	1	0
22	GK	(Malaysia) Hafizul Hakim	20	0	4	0	10	0	34	0	0	0
23	DF	(Malaysia) Amirul Azhan	17	0	3	0	9	0	29	0	4	0
24	DF	(Malaysia) K. Shathiya	0	0	0	0	2	0	2	0	0	0
25	DF	(Malaysia) Rafiuddin Roddin	1(5)	0	0(2)	0	0(6)	0	1(13)	0	1	0
27	MF	(Malaysia) Hafiz Kamal	0	0	0	0	0	0	0	0	0	0
30	FW	(Malaysia) Nizad Ayub	1(10)	0	0(3)	0	0(4)	0	1(17)	0	0	0
Left club during season
16	FW	(Philippines) Misagh Bahadoran	9(2)	0	0	0	0	0	9(2)	0	0	0
5	DF	(Australia) Robert Cornthwaite	10	1	4	0	0	0	14	1	1	0

Last updated: 27 October 2018.
Source: Perak TBG F.C.

=== Clean sheets ===
Rnk	No.	Player	League	FA Cup	League Cup	Total
1	22	(Malaysia) Hafizul Hakim	6	0	4	10
2	18	(Malaysia) Khairul Amri	1	0	0	1

== Transfers ==
=== In ===
1st leg

Date	Pos	Player	Transferred From	Ref.
December 2017	MF	(Malaysia) Rafiuddin Rodin	(Malaysia) Penang	
December 2017	MF	(Malaysia) Brendan Gan	Unattached	
December 2017	ST	(Malaysia) Nor Hakim Hassan	(Malaysia) T-Team	
December 2017	ST	(Malaysia) Khairul Asyraf	Unattached	
December 2017	DF	(Malaysia) Rafiq Faeez	Unattached	
December 2017	DF	(Malaysia) Syazwan Bahari	(Malaysia) PKNP (loan return)	
December 2017	DF	(Malaysia) Rizal Aziz	(Malaysia) Youth system	
December 2017	GK	(Malaysia) Nasrullah Abdul Aziz	(Malaysia) Youth system	
January 2018	MF	(Philippines) Misagh Bahadoran	(Philippines) Global	
January 2018	MF	(Brazil) Wander Luiz	(Saudi Arabia) Al-Raed	
January 2018	DF	(Australia) Robert Cornthwaite	(Australia) Western Sydney Wanderers	

2nd leg

Date	Pos	Player	Transferred From	Ref.
May 2018	DF	(Lebanon) Jad Noureddine	(Lebanon) Al-Safa'	

=== Out ===
1st leg

Date	Pos	Player	Transferred To	Ref.
December 2017	ST	(Malaysia) Zaquan Adha	(Malaysia) Kuala Lumpur	
December 2017	DF	(Brazil) Thiago Junior Aquino	(Malaysia) Felda United	
December 2017	GK	(Malaysia) Syazani Puat	(Malaysia) PKNP	
December 2017	DF	(Malaysia) Ibrahim Aziz	Unattached	
December 2017	DF	(Malaysia) Shahrom Kalam	(Malaysia) Felcra	
December 2017	MF	(Malaysia) Jasazrin Jamaluddin	(Malaysia) Penang	
December 2017	MF	(Palestine) Yashir Pinto	(Chile) Curicó Unido	
December 2017	ST	(Malaysia) Abdul Hadi Yahya	(Malaysia) Kuantan	
December 2017	MF	(Malaysia) Wan Mohd Syukri	(Malaysia) MISC-MIFA	
December 2017	DF	(Malaysia) Muhd Arif Ismail	Unattached	

2nd leg

Date	Pos	Player	Transferred To	Ref.
May 2018	ST	(Philippines) Misagh Bahadoran	Free agent	
May 2018	DF	(Australia) Robert Cornthwaite	Free agent	
