= MRSM Gerik =

MARA Junior Science College Gerik
- Maktab Rendah Sains MARA Gerik

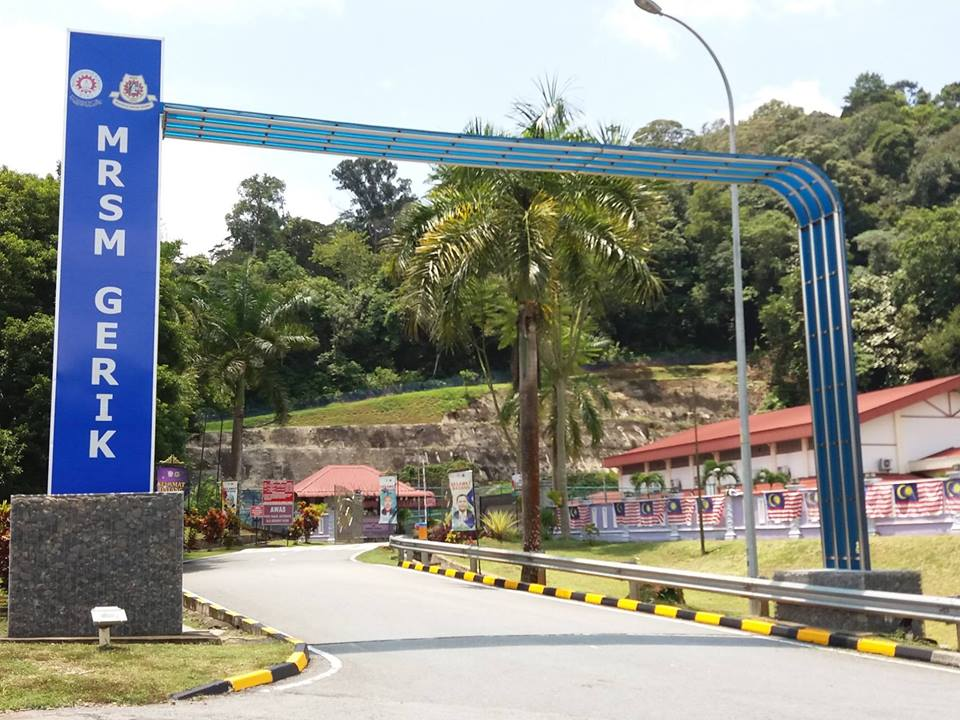
- School entrance

Location
- Gerik, Perak; Malaysia
- Coordinates: 5.385399°N 101.056607°E

Information
- School type: High Performance School; Fully residential school
- Motto: Berdisiplin Berilmu Beramal
- Established: 1994
- School district: Hulu Perak
- Principal: Muhamad Abu Bakar Bin Ismail
- Head Warden: Faizul Bin Che Ali
- Grades: Form 1 to Form 5
- Enrollment: +/- 500
- Language: Malay, English
- Colours: Brown, Blue and Yellow
- Yearbook: Prisma
- Affiliations: Ministry of Education (Malaysia) Majlis Amanah Rakyat
- Alumni: ANSARA Gerik
- Website: gerik.mrsm.edu.my

Maktab Rendah Sains MARA Gerik, commonly known as MRSM Gerik, is a co-educational boarding school established in 1994 under Education and Training (Secondary) Division of MARA (Majlis Amanah Rakyat, Malay for People's Trust Council). The campus is located in Gerik, Hulu Perak District, Perak, Malaysia.

== Background ==
MRSM Gerik was completed in 1991. It is located in Nassah hill, Kampung Kenayat, with an area of 75 acres. The distance from Gerik town is about 13 km.

The recruitment of MRSM Gerik teachers and staff began on December 1, 1993. The initial phase of student recruitment was at the end of January 1994 where MRSM Gerik recruited students from Form 2 to 94 while in February 1994 the Form 1 students were 144.

In the early stages, there was not much infrastructure available but now, with the completion of phase 2 construction, MRSM Gerik has been equipped with a variety of facilities and equipment to meet the educational needs and requirements. The construction of phase 2 involves the addition of offices, halls, living skills workshops, dormitories, principal's homes and assistant principals, teachers' homes and staff homes.

== Student development ==
There are some student organisations that empower MRSM students:

1. Student Representative Council (BWP)

Consists of students elected by students through the electoral process. The main BWP roles are:

- Promote the welfare of students in collaboration with College administration.
- Become a medium for the student body and administration.
- Organize student activities
- Facilitate the implementation of College activities.

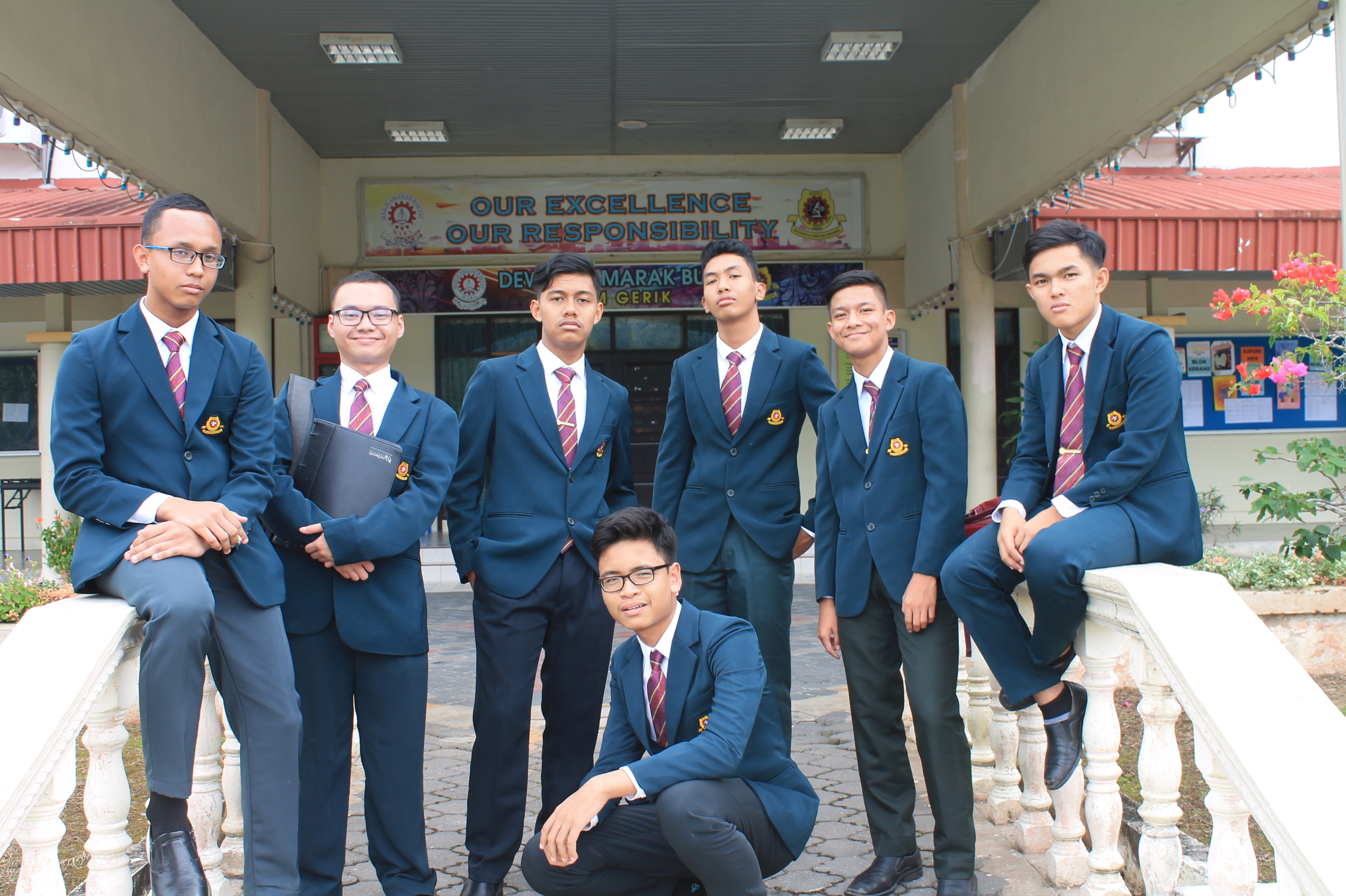
Student Representatives Council (BWP) of MRSM Gerik 18/19

2. Student Disciplinary Board

Student Disciplinary Board (LDP) is one of the branches of extra-curricular activities that helps college students enforce college regulations. LDP Student Disciplinary Board was established to:

- Create a harmonious learning environment in MRSM where students are disciplined and honorable.
- Create a generation of students with good leadership characteristics.
- Names of eligible students who have leadership qualities will be proposed and an interview will be conducted for their selection process.

== Alumni ==
The alumni association of MRSM Gerik is known as the ANSARA Gerik (ANak SAins MARA Gerik).

=== Notable alumni ===
- Amirizwan Taj Tajuddin - Former Malaysia national footballer last played for several Malaysia Super League team. Now serve as coach for Malaysia under-17
- Ahmad Shahir Ismail - Former footballer and now act as coach at Mokhtar Dahari Academy in Gambang, Pahang.
