= Shahfiq Ghani =

Singaporean footballer (born 1992)

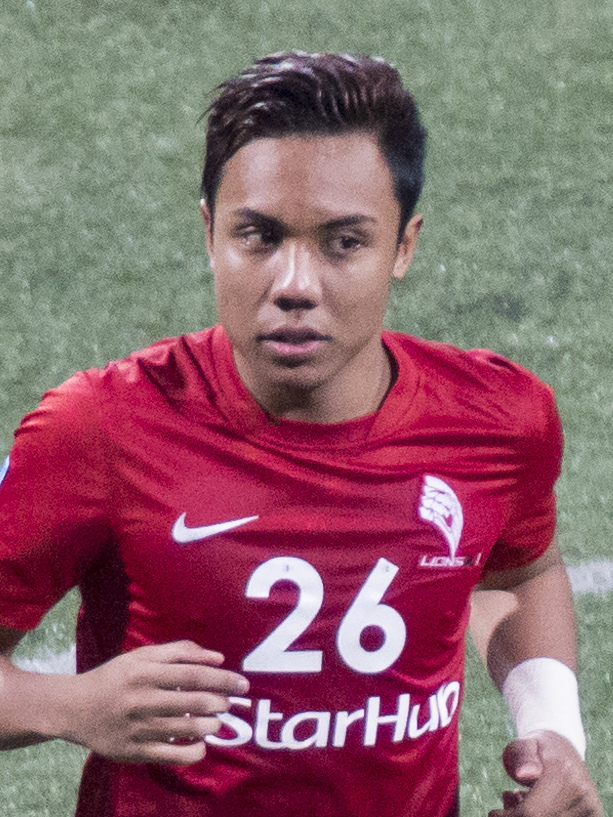
- Shahfiq Ghani playing for LionsXII in 2013

Personal information
- Full name: Muhammad Shahfiq bin Ghani
- Date of birth: 17 March 1992 (age 34)
- Place of birth: Singapore
- Height: 1.75 m (5 ft 9 in)
- Positions: Forward; midfielder

Team information
- Current team: Geylang International

Youth career
- 2005–2010: National Football Academy

Senior career*
| Years | Team | Apps | (Gls) |
| 2010–2012 | Young Lions | 37 | (7) |
| 2013–2014 | LionsXII | 22 | (5) |
| 2015 | Young Lions | 22 | (4) |
| 2016–2017 | Geylang International | 21 | (3) |
| 2018–2022 | Hougang United | 26 | (6) |
| 2023–2024 | Geylang International | 15 | (1) |

International career^{‡}
| 2010– | Singapore U23 | 15 | (3) |
| 2012– | Singapore | 14 | (2) |
Medal record
Men's football
Representing Singapore
SEA Games
| Bronze medal – third place | Naypyidaw 2013 | Team |
- * Club domestic league appearances and goals as of 30 December 2017 ‡ National team caps and goals as of 22:23, 25 November 2016 (UTC)

Muhammad Shahfiq bin Ghani (born 17 March 1992), also known as Shahfiq Shahfiq or just Shahfiq, is a Singaporean professional footballer who plays either as a centre forward or attacking midfielder for Malaysia Super League club Negeri Sembilan and the Singapore national team. He is known as a free-kick specialist.

== Club career ==
=== Young Lions ===
Shahfiq began his club career with S.League club Young Lions in 2010. He scored 7 goals in 37 competitive matches over three Seasons from 2010 to 2012.

=== LionsXII ===
Shahfiq was selected to be in the LionsXII squad in 2013. He contributed with 5 goals in 13 MSL matches as LionsXII won the 2013 Malaysia Super League. He drew criticism from head coach V. Sundramoorthy for his dismissal for slapping Sarawak's Muamer Salibašić in a Malaysia Cup match on 24 August 2013.

A spinal injury threatened to rule Shahfiq out for the start of the 2014 season. He missed the Charity Cup match against Pahang and the Malaysia FA Cup match against DRB-Hicom, returning as a 74th-minute substitute against Selangor on 25 January. In total, he spent only 77 minutes on the pitch for his club in 2014.

During his two-year spell with LionsXII, he scored six goals in 31 appearances.

=== Return to Young Lions ===
In 2015, Shahfiq return to the Young Lions, where he scored 5 goals in 22 league appearances for his club.

=== Geylang International ===
In 2016, it was announced that Shahfiq would be joining Geylang International at the start of the 2016 S.League season on a 2 year contract. However, he tore the anterior cruciate ligament in his knee during pre-season training and was ruled out for 6 months. This resulted in Shafiq missing most of the games of the season although he did make a return during the second half of the season. He returned to full fitness in July and made a surprise cameo appearance in the League Cup Plate Final against Hougang United. He marked his return from injury by scoring a goal for his club in a friendly match against the Cambodia national football team and laying off an assist for a last gasp goal in a 2-1 victory over Balestier Khalsa in the league.

He scored in his first goal for the club during the last game of the season in a 4-1 win over Home United. He came back strongly enough to be recalled back to the national team and making the final 23 for Singapore's disappointing 2016 AFF Championship.

Shahfiq scored his first goal of the 2017 S.League season in a 2-0 win over Brunei DPMM FC while also winning another penalty which teammate Víctor Coto converted.

=== Hougang United ===
After being rumoured to join UKM F.C. in Malaysia, Shahfiq signed for Hougang United in 2018.

== International career ==
Shahfiq was part of the Singapore national under-23 football team that won the bronze medal at the 2009 & 2013 Southeast Asian Games.

He earned his first senior international cap in a friendly match against Hong Kong on 15 August 2012. His first international goal came against China PR in a friendly match in 2013.

== Personal life ==
Shahfiq graduated from the Singapore Sports School in 2008.

== Career statistics ==
=== Club ===
As of match played 27 Feb 2022. Caps and goals may not be correct.

| Club | Season | S.League | | Singapore Cup | | Singapore League Cup | | Asia | | Total | |
| Club | Season | Apps | Goals | Apps | Goals | Apps | Goals | Apps | Goals | Apps | Goals |
|---|---|---|---|---|---|---|---|---|---|---|---|
| Young Lions | 2010 | 16 | 3 | 4 | 0 | - | - | — | | 20 | 3 |
| Young Lions | 2011 | 8 | 2 | — | | — | | — | | 8 | 2 |
| Young Lions | 2012 | 13 | 2 | — | | 4 | 0 | — | | 17 | 2 |
| Young Lions | Total | 37 | 7 | 4 | 0 | 4 | 0 | 0 | 0 | 45 | 7 |
| Club | Season | Malaysia Super League | | Malaysia FA Cup | | Malaysia Cup | | Asia | | Total | |
| LionsXII | 2013 | 13 | 5 | 0 | 0 | 6 | 1 | — | | 19 | 6 |
| LionsXII | 2014 | 9 | 0 | 0 | 0 | 0 | 0 | — | | 9 | 0 |
| LionsXII | Total | 22 | 5 | 0 | 0 | 6 | 1 | 0 | 0 | 28 | 6 |
| Club | Season | S.League | | Singapore Cup | | Singapore League Cup | | Asia | | Total | |
| Young Lions | 2015 | ?? | ?? | ?? | ?? | - | - | — | | ?? | ?? |
| Young Lions | Total | ?? | ?? | ?? | ?? | ?? | ?? | ?? | ?? | ?? | ?? |
| Geylang International | 2016 | 6 | 1 | 0 | 0 | 1 | 0 | — | | 7 | 1 |
| Geylang International | 2017 | 17 | 5 | 1 | 0 | 2 | 0 | — | | 20 | 5 |
| Geylang International | Total | 23 | 6 | 1 | 0 | 3 | 0 | 0 | 0 | 27 | 6 |
| Hougang United | 2018 | 12 | 2 | 2 | 0 | 0 | 0 | — | | 14 | 2 |
| Hougang United | 2019 | 10 | 8 | 2 | 0 | 0 | 0 | — | | 12 | 8 |
| Hougang United | 2020 | 11 | 1 | 0 | 0 | 1 | 0 | 3 | 0 | 15 | 1 |
| Hougang United | 2021 | 11 | 1 | 0 | 0 | 0 | 0 | 0 | 0 | 11 | 1 |
| Hougang United | 2022 | 15 | 1 | 4 | 0 | 0 | 0 | 2 | 0 | 21 | 1 |
| Hougang United | Total | 59 | 12 | 8 | 0 | 2 | 0 | 5 | 0 | 73 | 13 |
| Geylang International | 2023 | 0 | 0 | 0 | 0 | 0 | 0 | 0 | 0 | 0 | 0 |
| Geylang International | Total | 0 | 0 | 0 | 0 | 0 | 0 | 0 | 0 | 0 | 0 |
| Career total | | 137 | 29 | 9 | 0 | 15 | 1 | 3 | 0 | 155 | 31 |

- Young Lions and LionsXII are ineligible for qualification to AFC competitions in their respective leagues.
- Young Lions withdrew from the 2011 and 2012 Singapore Cup and the 2011 Singapore League Cup due to their players participating in AFC and AFF youth competitions.

=== International ===
International goals

| No | Date | Venue | Opponent | Score | Result | Competition |
|---|---|---|---|---|---|---|
| 1 | 6 September 2013 | TEDA Football Stadium, Tianjin, China PR | China | 1–1 | 6–1 | Friendly |

Singapore national team
| Year | Apps | Goals |
|---|---|---|
| 2012 | 2 | 0 |
| 2013 | 6 | 1 |
| 2014 | 1 | 0 |
| Total | 9 | 1 |

Statistics accurate as of match played 5 March 2014

=== U23 International goals ===
| No | Date | Venue | Opponent | Score | Result | Competition |
|---|---|---|---|---|---|---|
| 1 | 8 June 2013 | Indonesia | Indonesia | 1-0 | 1-1 | U23 International Friendly |
| 2 | 14 September 2013 | Darul Makmur Stadium, Kuantan | Thailand | 1-0 | 2-1 | 2013 Merdeka Tournament |
| 3 | 2 April 2014 | Hougang Stadium, Singapore | Indonesia | 1-2 | 1-2 | U23 International Friendly |
| 4 | 14 September 2014 | Ansan Wa~ Stadium, Korea | Palestine | 1-0 | 2-1 | 2014 Asian Games |
| 5 | 14 September 2014 | Ansan Wa~ Stadium, Korea | Palestine | 2-0 | 2-1 | 2014 Asian Games |
| 6 | 16 May 2015 | Shizuoka, Japan | (Japan) Shizuoka Sangyo University SC | 1-0 | 3-0 | U23 International Friendly |
| 7 | 16 May 2015 | Shizuoka, Japan | (Japan) Shizuoka Sangyo University SC | 2-0 | 3-0 | U23 International Friendly |
| 8 | 22 May 2015 | Jalan Besar Stadium, Singapore | Laos | 3-1 | 5-1 | U23 International Friendly |
| 9 | 30 May 2015 | Jalan Besar Stadium, Singapore | Timor-Leste | 2-0 | 2-0 | U23 International Friendly |

== Honours ==
=== Club ===
LionsXII

- Malaysia Super League: 2013

Hougang United

- Singapore Cup: 2022

=== International ===
Singapore

- Southeast Asian Games: Bronze 2009 & 2013
