= Amirizdwan Taj =

Malaysian footballer

Personal information
- Full name: Amirizdwan Taj bin Tajuddin
- Date of birth: 30 March 1986 (age 40)
- Place of birth: Kelantan, Malaysia
- Height: 1.85 m (6 ft 1 in)
- Position: Centre back

College career
Years	Team	Apps	(Gls)
2004–2008	UiTM		

Senior career*
Years	Team	Apps	(Gls)
2008–2011	UiTM		
2012–2015	ATM	48	(11)
2015–2016	Kelantan	21	(3)
2016–2017	Terengganu	22	(0)
2017–2018	PKNS	11	(0)
2018	Kelantan	2	(0)
2019	Perlis	0	(0)
2019–2020	Kelantan United	21	(0)
Total		125	(14)

International career^{‡}
2011–2015	Malaysia	14	(0)

Managerial career
- 2021–: Mokhtar Dahari Academy (assistant coach)
- * Club domestic league appearances and goals as of June 26, 2019 ‡ National team caps and goals as of June 20, 2023

Amirizdwan Taj Bin Tajuddin (born 30 March 1986), commonly known as Taj, is a Malaysian former professional footballer who plays as a centre back and capped by Malaysian national team.

Born in Kota Bharu, Kelantan, Taj never seriously play football at his youth where he attended MRSM Gerik and later MRSM Kuala Terengganu. His football career began while completing his undergraduate studies at Universiti Teknologi MARA where he played for UiTM FC. During that time, Taj was commonly known by nickname Panjang which means tall in English, to describe his tall physic body compared to his other teammates. Taj was a late bloomer which was not from regular state President Cup or youth teams.

== Club career ==
=== UITM ===
Amirizdwan further his study at Universiti Teknologi MARA in Sport Science. He then join UiTM football team to play for IPT League. His series of good performance caught the eye of several coach from other club and one of them was former coach of Kelantan, B. Sathianathan in a friendly between UiTM Fc and Kelantan. When B. Sathianathan appointed as ATM, he signs Amirizdwan.

Amirizdwan joined ATM at the start of the year after three seasons with UiTM and immediately tasted success after helping his side winning the Malaysia Premier League, and gain promotion to the Malaysia Super League. He also won Sultan Haji Ahmad Shah Cup in 2013 with ATM.

Amirizdwan has been described as a complete and versatile player due to his excellent technical ability, vision and passing range. He has also been referred to as a strong, tall, tenacious, influential, hardworking, and physical player. He has played much of his career as a centre defender, but has also been used as a holding midfielder at early of his career.

He represented Malaysia in 2011 Summer Universiade alongside K. Reuben. Malaysia finished 12th in the tournament.

Amirizdwan made his international debut for Malaysia national football team in 2011 at the age of 25. He was called up to the national squad just before he made the move, but as soon as he started helping the Armed Forces dominate the Premier League in 2012, his regular inclusion in the national set-up was a no-brainer. Despite play for Harimau Malaya occasionally, he never gets a chance to play for big tournament due to injuries and being overlooked by the coach.

=== ATM FA ===
In 2012, Amirizdwan joined ATM and was given squad number 24. He helped his side in winning the 2012 Malaysia Premier League, and promotion to the Malaysia Super League for 2013 season. At the start of his ATM's career, Amirizdwan usually used as a midfielder but later switch his position to central defender.

==== 2015 season ====
In April, they removed B. Sathianathan from the head coach position, sparking an exodus of players. Amirizdwan finally decided to end ties with ATM and return to his home state. A fresh start, was what he was ultimately craving for.

=== Kelantan FA ===
Amirizdwan signed with Kelantan FA in April 2015, The signing was announced on the Red Warriors' social media accounts, which also added that the Kota Bharu-born former UiTM FC player would be wearing number 42 on his kit for the remainder of 2015 season. Amirizdwan has been linked with home state team for the past few years, after his rise from university-level football. He scored his first goal for Kelantan with a header against Sime Darby FC which ended 2-2 that night. At the time that the Red Warriors were undergoing a severe financial crisis Amirizdwan's departure was widely discussed.

=== Terengganu FA ===
To be honest, I didn’t leave Kelantan because of salary payment issues. There were several other problems that I’ll keep confidential, out of respect to them

— Amirizdwan Taj on signing for Terengganu.

Despite interest from other clubs, Amirizdwan signed with Terengganu FA on 2 December 2015. He will be given number 3 in the squad. A few weeks ago though, speculations of his departure became rife, with Kelantan's well-documented financial issues dominating the narrative. Amir though after signing his contract with the Turtles yesterday claims that his departure was ultimately fueled by other reasons.

Six months after signing with the club, Amir was released by Terengganu without making any appearance. The former UiTM, ATM and Kelantan player has experienced long-term injuries.

=== PKNS FC ===
Amir signed for PKNS FC for 2017 season.

== International career ==
Playing for the national team is the biggest honour for any football

— Amirizdwan Taj

In October 2011, he was called up by K. Rajagobal for the national team's training session for an international friendly against India.

== Managerial career ==
On 1 February 2021, he was hired to became assistant coach for Mokhtar Dahari Academy to aid producing quality young players from the grassroots development program.

== Career statistics ==
=== Club ===
As of match played on 13 December 2018.

Appearances and goals by club, season and competition
Club	Season	League			Cup		League Cup		Total	
Club	Season	Division	Apps	Goals	Apps	Goals	Apps	Goals	Apps	Goals
ATM	2012	Malaysia Premier League	0	0	0	0	0	0	0	0
ATM	2013	Malaysia Super League	0	0	0	0	2	0	0	0
ATM	2014	Malaysia Super League	0	0	0	0	0	0	0	0
ATM	2015	Malaysia Super League	0	0	0	0	0	0	0	0
ATM	Total		48	0	0	0	0	0	48	11
Kelantan	2015	Malaysia Super League	9	1	3	0	6	0	9	1
Kelantan	Total		9	1	3	0	6	0	9	1
Terengganu	2016	Malaysia Super League	0	0	0	0	0	0	0	0
Terengganu	Total		0	0	0	0	0	0	0	0
PKNS FC	2017	Malaysia Super League	2	0	0	0	0	0	2	0
PKNS FC	Total		2	0	0	0	0	0	2	0
Kelantan	2018	Malaysia Super League	2	0	0	0	0	0	2	0
Kelantan	Total		2	0	0	0	0	0	2	0
Perlis	2019	Malaysia Super League	0	0	0	0	0	0	0	0
Perlis	Total		0	0	0	0	0	0	0	0
Kelantan United	2019	Malaysia M3 League	4	0	0	0	0	0	4	0
Kelantan United	Total		4	0	0	0	0	0	4	0
Total	Career total		65	1	3	0	6	0	67	12

=== International ===
As of match played 8 September 2015.

Appearances and goals by national team and year
National team	Year	Apps	Goals
Malaysia	2011	4	0
Malaysia	2012	5	0
Malaysia	2013	4	1
Malaysia	2014	4	1
Total		17	2

== Honours ==
=== Club ===
ATM FA

- Malaysia Premier League : 2012
- Malaysia Cup : runner-up 2012
- Sultan Haji Ahmad Shah Cup : 2013

Kelantan FA

- Malaysia FA Cup : runner-up 2015

Kelantan United F.C.

- Malaysia M3 League : 2019

== Personal life ==
Amirizdwan is a Kelantan supporter. He married longtime girlfriend Anna Syahida Tamsir when they were student at UITM Shah Alam. He also an excellent student during his school days when he enrolled in Mara junior college. He also has siblings that played football professionally, amir ikhwan taj played for uitm fc, amir izham taj for felda utd u21.

In 2011, he was selected for the national team for a friendly match against India. At the time of his selection, he was playing for UiTM FC in the FAM League.
