= Syafiq Zainal =

Singaporean footballer (born 1991)

Personal information
- Full name: Muhammad Syafiq bin Mohamed Zainal
- Date of birth: 19 July 1991 (age 35)
- Place of birth: Singapore
- Height: 1.72 m (5 ft 7 1/2 in)
- Position: Forward

Team information
- Current team: Balestier United
- Number: 10

Senior career*
Years	Team	Apps	(Gls)
2010	Balestier Khalsa	16	(0)
2011–2012	Young Lions	16	(2)
2013–2015	LionsXII	9	(1)
2016	Balestier Khalsa	20	(2)
2017	Balestier United		

International career
- Singapore U21
- Singapore U23
- * Club domestic league appearances and goals as of 15 March 2014

Muhammad Syafiq bin Mohamed Zainal (born 19 July 1991) is a Singaporean footballer who plays as a forward for Balestier Khalsa RC.

== Club career ==
Syafiq began his football career with Balestier Khalsa in the S.League in 2010. He moved to Young Lions the following season.

In January 2013, he was named in the LionsXII squad for the 2013 Malaysia Super League. He scored the winner in a Super League match over Terengganu on 19 January.

He signed for Balestier United RC after being released by the Tigers in 2016.

== Personal life ==
Syafiq graduated from the Singapore Sports School in 2007.

== Career statistics ==
=== Club ===
As of match played November 2016. Caps and goals may not be correct.

Club	Season	S.League		Singapore Cup		League Cup		Asia		Total	
Club	Season	Apps	Goals	Apps	Goals	Apps	Goals	Apps	Goals	Apps	Goals
Balestier Khalsa	2010	16	0	1	0	-	-	—		17	0
Balestier Khalsa	Total	16	0	1	0	0	0	0	0	17	0
Young Lions	2011	12	2	—		—		—		12	2
Young Lions	2012	4	0	—		2	0	—		6	0
Young Lions	Total	16	2	0	0	2	0	0	0	18	2
Club	Season	Malaysia Super League		FA Cup		Malaysia Cup		Asia		Total	
LionsXII	2013	8	1	0	0	1	0	—		9	1
LionsXII	2014	1	0	1	0	0	0	—		2	0
LionsXII	2015	??	??	??	??	??	??	—		??	??
LionsXII	Total	9	1	1	0	1	0	0	0	11	1
Club	Season	S.League		Singapore Cup		League Cup		Asia		Total	
Balestier Khalsa	2016	20	2	4	0	4	0	5	0	32	2
Balestier Khalsa	2017	0	0	0	0	0	0	—		0	0
Balestier Khalsa	Total	20	2	4	0	4	0	5	0	32	2
Career Total		61	5	6	0	7	0	5	0	78	5

- Young Lions and LionsXII are ineligible for qualification to AFC competitions in their respective leagues.
- Young Lions withdrew from the 2011 and 2012 Singapore Cup, and the 2011 Singapore League Cup due to participation in AFC and AFF youth competitions.

== Honours ==
=== Club ===
LionsXII

- Malaysia Super League: 2013
