= Naval Base Stadium =

Football stadium in Lumut, Perak, Malaysia

Coordinates: 4°13′17.2″N 100°36′18.8″E

Naval Base Stadium or Armed Forces Stadium is a football stadium in Lumut, Perak, Malaysia. It is used mostly for football matches. It sometimes hosted home matches of Perak FA, when their home ground Perak Stadium was not available. The stadium holds 12,000 people and was opened in 1980.
