= Fauzi Nan =

Malaysian footballer

Personal information
- Full name: Mohd Fauzi Nan
- Date of birth: 20 January 1980 (age 46)
- Place of birth: Pendang, Kedah, Malaysia
- Height: 1.70 m (5 ft 7 in)
- Position: Defender

Youth career
- 1998–2002: Kedah FA

Senior career*
Years	Team	Apps	(Gls)
2003–2004	Kedah FA		
2005–2006	Selangor MPPJ		
2007–2010	Perlis FA		
2010–2012	Kedah FA		
2013–2015	Negeri Sembilan FA		

International career^{‡}
2008	Malaysia XI	1	(0)
2006–2015	Malaysia	14	(0)

Managerial career
- 2018–2019: Kedah Darul Aman (U-21) (assistant)
- 2020–2021: Kedah Darul Aman (U-21)
- * Club domestic league appearances and goals ‡ National team caps and goals as of 21 January 2009

Mohd Fauzi Nan is a Malaysian footballer who last played for Negeri Sembilan FA in the Malaysian Premier League as a defender before retiring. He previously played for Kedah, Selangor MPPJ and Perlis FA . He is the current head coach of Kedah U-21 .

== Career as player ==
In the 2009 pre-season he was supposed to sign a contract with his former team, Kedah but later changed his mind and played for their neighbouring team and rivals Perlis instead. He became a squad member of Kedah for the 2011 season eventually. He is also a Malaysian national team member, playing in the 2007 Asian Cup Final and the 2010 AFF Suzuki Cup.

He was also part of the Malaysia XI squad that faced Chelsea F.C. in 2008 where Malaysia lost 0–2.

== Career as coach ==
On 2019, Fauzi Nan was appointed an assistant coach at Kedah U-21 under coach Mohd Azraai Khor Abdullah. In 2020 he coaches Kedah FA President's Cup U-21 squad.

== Managerial statistics ==
As of match played 12 March 2020

Team	From	To	Record				
Team	From	To	G	W	D	L	Win%
Kedah U-21	2020	2021	4	2	1	1	50.00
Total			4	2	1	1	50.00
