= Nizad Ayub =

Malaysian footballer (born 1988)

Personal information
- Full name: Mohd Nizad bin Ayub
- Date of birth: 30 August 1988 (age 38)
- Place of birth: Kelantan, Malaysia
- Height: 1.70 m (5 ft 7 in)
- Positions: Striker; attacking midfielder

Team information
- Current team: Kelantan United
- Number: 9

Youth career
- 2005–2006: Kelantan President's Cup Team

Senior career*
Years	Team	Apps	(Gls)
2007–2009	Kelantan		
2009–2010	Felda United		
2010–2013	Kelantan		
2012	→ Felda United (loan)	7	(3)
2013	→ PKNS (loan)		
2014	T-Team		
2015	Sime Darby	6	(1)
2016	MOF		
2017–2018	Perak	16	(1)
2019–	Kelantan United		
- * Club domestic league appearances and goals as of 5 November 2019

Mohd Nizad bin Ayub (born 30 August 1988) is a Malaysian professional footballer who plays for Malaysia M3 League club Kelantan United as a forward.

Nizad started his football career playing for Kelantan youth team before been promoted to the first team in 2007. In 2009, he signed a contract with Felda United.

== Club career ==
=== Sime Darby ===
Nizad signed a one-year contract with Sime Darby in 2015. He made eight appearances and one goal for the club.

=== Perak ===
Nizad signed with Perak in 2017. He made ten appearances and two goals during his debut season with Perak.

== Career statistics ==
=== Club ===
As of 28 July 2018

Appearances and goals by club, season and competition
Club	Season	League			Cup		League Cup		Continental		Total	
Club	Season	Division	Apps	Goals	Apps	Goals	Apps	Goals	Apps	Goals	Apps	Goals
Perak	2017	Malaysia Super League	5	1	1	0	4	1	–		10	2
Perak	2018	Malaysia Super League	11	0	3	0	0	0	–		14	0
Perak	Total		16	1	4	0	4	1	–		24	2
Career total			0	0	0	0	0	0	–		0	0

== Honours ==
Kelantan

- Malaysia Cup: runners-up 2009
- Malaysia FA Cup: runners-up 2009, 2011

Perak

- Malaysia Cup: 2018

Kelantan United

- Malaysia M3 League: 2019
