= Helmi Remeli =

Malaysian footballer

Personal information
- Full name: Mohammad Helmi Bin Remeli
- Date of birth: 24 March 1985 (age 41)
- Place of birth: Kedah, Malaysia
- Height: 1.75 m (5 ft 9 in)
- Position: Defender

Senior career*
Years	Team	Apps	(Gls)
2007–2009	Kuala Muda Naza	38	(6)
2010–2011	Terengganu	24	(1)
2012–2014	PKNS FC	61	(7)
2015	Terengganu	16	(2)
2016–2017	Kuala Lumpur	35	(4)
2018	Marcerra United		
2018	D'AR Wanderers		

International career^{‡}
2011–2013	Malaysia	4	(0)
- * Club domestic league appearances and goals ‡ National team caps and goals as of 31 December 2015

Mohammad Helmi Bin Remeli (born 24 March 1985 in Kedah) is a Malaysian professional footballer who plays as a defender.

Helmi made his debut for Malaysia national team in the friendly match against Hong Kong on 3 June 2011. In 2016, Helmi left Terengganu for Kuala Lumpur.

== Career statistics ==
As of 1 November 2017

Club	Season	League		Cup (Note: The Malaysia FA Cup)		League Cup (Note: The Malaysia Cup)		Continental		Total	
Club	Season	Apps	Goals	Apps	Goals	Apps	Goals	Apps	Goals	Apps	Goals
Terengganu	2015	16	2	4	0	1	0	–		21	2
Terengganu total		16	2	4	0	1	0	0	0	21	1
Kuala Lumpur	2016	18	3	4	0	6	0	–		28	3
Kuala Lumpur	2017	17	1	1	0	4	0	–		22	1
Kuala Lumpur total		35	4	5	0	10	0	0	0	50	0
