= Júnior Pereira =

Brazilian footballer (born 1987)

Personal information
- Full name: Carlos Roberto Alves Pereira Júnior
- Date of birth: February 4, 1987 (age 39)
- Place of birth: Goiânia, Brazil
- Height: 1.90 m (6 ft 3 in)
- Position: Defender

Team information
- Current team: Bom Jesus

Youth career
- 2000–2002: Santos
- 2003–2004: Cruzeiro

Senior career*
Years	Team	Apps	(Gls)
2005–2006	Náutico		
2006–2007	Goiás		
2007–2008	Atlético Goianiense		
2008	Trindade		
2009–2010	Sinop		
2010–2011	Iporá		
2011	América de Teófilo Otoni		
2011–2013	Naval		
2012–2013	→ Leixões (Loan)		
2013	Felda United		
2014	Guarany de Sobral		
2015	Iporá		
2016	Rio Branco-SP		
2016	Goiânia		
2017–	Bom Jesus		
- * Club domestic league appearances and goals

Carlos Roberto Alves Pereira Júnior (born February 4, 1987, in Goiânia), known as just Júnior Pereira, is a Brazilian football player who currently plays for FELDA United FC as a defender in the Malaysia Super League.
