= Damir Ibrić =

Bosnian-Herzegovinian retired footballer (born 1984)

Personal information
- Full name: Damir Ibrić Yüksel
- Date of birth: 30 March 1984 (age 42)
- Place of birth: Izmit, Turkey
- Height: 1.90 m (6 ft 3 in)
- Positions: Striker; attacking midfielder

Team information
- Current team: B68 Toftir
- Number: 16

Youth career
- 1998–2003: Le Havre AC

Senior career*
Years	Team	Apps	(Gls)
2003–2004	Gençlerbirliği	1	(0)
2004–2005	Yıldırım Bosna	16	(6)
2005–2007	Kocaelispor	2	(0)
2005–2006	→ Darıca Gençlerbirliği (loan)	10	(1)
2006–2007	→ Yıldırım Bosna (loan)	18	(5)
2007	Qingdao Jonoon	21	(6)
2008	Eyüpspor	2	(0)
2008–2009	→ Araklıspor (loan)	21	(6)
2009–2012	Kocaelispor	20	(6)
2012–2013	Concordia Chiajna	7	(1)
2013–2014	T-Team FC	10	(5)
2015	Mladost Velika Obarska	14	(1)
2015	Sheikh Russel	2	(2)
2016	Lovćen	13	(1)
2016	B68 Toftir	7	(3)

International career^{‡}
2005	Bosnia & Herzegovina U21	2	(1)
- * Club domestic league appearances and goals as of 4 April 2017 ‡ National team caps and goals as of 16 July 2008

Damir Ibrić Yüksel (born 30 March 1984) is a Bosnian-Herzegovinian retired footballer who last played as a striker for Faroese club B68 Toftir.

He was born in Izmit, Turkey and has dual citizenship, Bosnian and Turkish. His father, Senad Ibrić, was also a footballer and played for Kocaelispor.

== Club career ==
In 1997, when he was only 13 years old, he moved to Le Havre AC from Turkish side Kocaelispor. He was attending one of the most prestigious youth football academy in the world at that time. After 5 successful years in Le Havre AC he moved to Turkish club Gençlerbirliği. During time in Gençlerbirliği, he was part of the squad who reached UEFA Cup quarterfinal and played in Turkish Cup final.

He played with Kocaelispor in the Turkish Second League between 2010 and 2012, then in 2012–13 he played with CS Concordia Chiajna in the Romanian Liga I, and in 2013 he joined T–Team F.C. and played in the Malaysia Super League.
