= Jalaluddin Jaafar =

Malaysian footballer

Personal information
- Full name: Jalaluddin bin Abu Jaafar
- Date of birth: 1 January 1975 (age 51)
- Place of birth: Pekan, Pahang, Malaysia
- Height: 1.73 m (5 ft 8 in)
- Position: Defender

Team information
- Current team: Retire

Senior career*
Years	Team	Apps	(Gls)
1997–2008	Pahang FA	330	(5)
2009–2010	Shahzan Muda	18	(0)
2010	→ Pahang FA (loan)	30	(1)
2011– 2015	Pahang FA	89	(0)
Total		467	(6)

International career^{‡}
1998– 2015	Malaysia	3	(0)
- * Club domestic league appearances and goals as of 9 June 2014 ‡ National team caps and goals as of 9 June 2014

Jalaluddin bin Abu Jaafar born 1 January 1975, commonly known as Jalal, is a Malaysian footballer who played for Pahang FA as a defender. He was the captain of the team.

== Career ==
He began his professional football career with Pahang FA in 1997. Since then, he has helped Pahang FA to win the Malaysia Premier League in 1999, the Malaysia Super League in 2004 and the Malaysia FA Cup in 2006.

Apart from Pahang FA, he also played for Shahzan Muda FC, also based in Pahang, for two seasons. He was loaned back to Pahang in 2009 for 2009 Malaysia Cup campaign and permanently stayed.

Though played for Pahang since 1997, he never won any Malaysia cup trophy.

2014 is another successful year for Jalal when Pahang ended up their domestic campaign with FA cup & Malaysia Cup. Both are dramatic finals when they trailed by behind to finished as champion and secure upcoming AFC Cup 2015 campaign. Though Jalal didn't play regularly he still gave his best when fielded since he is the oldest player of the team and most experiences amongst them.

== Personal life ==
Jalal is a father of two kids. He resides in Taman Guru, Kuantan. The reason why he was still fit for professional football until forty years old was because he had never suffered from any major injuries and had never gone through any major surgery. Therefore, he remained fit to play while other players of his generation had already hung up their boots by the time they reached their 30s.

In December 2015, he retired from professional football.

== Honours ==
=== Club ===
Pahang FA

- Malaysia Cup:
  - Winners (2): 2013, 2014
- FA Cup:
  - Winners (2): 2006, 2014
- Division 1/ Premier 1/ Super League:
  - Winners (2): 1999, 2004
- Malaysian Charity Shield
  - Winner (1): 2014
