= List of Malaysian football transfers 2015 =

The following is a list of transfers for 2015 Malaysian football.

== Malaysia Super League ==
The 2015 Malaysia Super League (also known as Liga Super Malaysia 2015 in Malay) is the 11th season of the highest Malaysian football league since its inception in 2004. Twelve teams participated in the league with Johor Darul Ta'zim F.C. as the defending champions.

LionsXII will not be permitted to have any foreign players as it is intended to remain as a development team for Singaporean players.

FAM allow four foreign players quota starts season 2015, and one must be from Asian countries.

== ATM FA ==
=== Transfers in ===
Entry date	Position	No	Player	From club	Fee
Nov 2014	GK		(Malaysia) Razi Effendi Suhit	(Malaysia) Perak FA	
Nov 2014	DL		(Malaysia) Azmeer Yusof	(Malaysia) Perak FA	
Nov 2014	DC		(Malaysia) Nur Rizzham Norman	(Malaysia) MOF F.C.	
Nov 2014	DC		(Nigeria) Obinna Nwaneri	(Malaysia) Kelantan FA	
Nov 2014	MC		(Australia) Mario Karlović	(Malaysia) Terengganu FA	
Nov 2014	AMR		(Malaysia) Fazrul Hazli Kadri	(Malaysia) Sime Darby F.C.	
Nov 2014	MC/AMC		(Malaysia) Mohd Fadzli Saari	(Malaysia) Sime Darby F.C.	
Nov 2014	MC		(Malaysia) Abdul Shukur Jusoh	(Malaysia) Selangor FA	
Nov 2014	MC		(Malaysia) Muhd Afiq Amsyar Salamat	(Malaysia) UiTM F.C.	
Nov 2014	ST		(Honduras) Jerry Palacios	(Costa Rica) L.D. Alajuelense	
Nov 2014	ST		(Nigeria) Abdulafees Abdulsalam	(Malaysia) Perak FA	
Nov 2014	ST		(Malaysia) Norshahrul Idlan Talaha	(Malaysia) Johor Darul Ta'zim F.C.	

=== Transfers out ===
Exit date	Position	No.	Player	To club	Fee
Nov 2014	GK		(Malaysia) Mohd Iqbal Suhaimi	(Malaysia) Sarawak FA	
Nov 2014	DLC		(Malaysia) Irwan Fadzli Idrus	(Malaysia) Negeri Sembilan FA	
	DC		(Malaysia) A. Luveen Vishnu	(Malaysia) Megah Murni F.C.	
Nov 2014	DLC		(Malaysia) Muhd Rafiq Zikrie Abdul Rahman	(Malaysia) Malacca United F.C.	
November 2014	DR		(Malaysia) Afiq Ahmad Razali	(Malaysia) Felda United F.C.	
Nov 2014	MR/AMR		(Malaysia) Mohd Azrul Ahmad	(Malaysia) Penang FA	
Nov 2014	MC		(Malaysia) Ahmad Fauzi Saari	(Malaysia) Negeri Sembilan FA	
Nov 2014	MC		(Malaysia) S. Thiban Raj	(Malaysia) Kuala Lumpur FA	
Nov 2014	MC		(Malaysia) Rezal Zambery Yahya	(Malaysia) Negeri Sembilan FA	
Nov 2014	ML		(Malaysia) Mohd Akmal Mohd Noor	(Malaysia) Negeri Sembilan FA	
Nov 2014	ML		(Malaysia) Syazuan Hazani	(Malaysia) Kedah FA	
Nov 2014	AMC		(Malaysia) Amirul Hakeem Abdul Rahman	(Malaysia) PKNS F.C.	
Nov 2014	MC		(Malaysia) Daniel Ong Ern Min	(Malaysia) Kuala Lumpur FA	
Nov 2014	MC		(Argentina) Bruno Martelotto	(Malaysia) Negeri Sembilan FA	
Nov 2014	ST		(Argentina) Juan Arostegui	Released	
Nov 2014	ST		(Malaysia) Rudie Ramli	(Malaysia) Negeri Sembilan FA	
Nov 2014	ST		(Malaysia) Pavithran a/l Pandian	(Malaysia) Kuala Lumpur FA	
Nov 2014	ST		(Haiti) Fabrice Noël	(Singapore) Tampines Rovers FC	
Apr 2015	DC		(Malaysia) Amirizdwan Taj Tajuddin	(Malaysia) Kelantan FA	
Apr 2015	MC		(Malaysia) Muhd Afiq Amsyar Salamat	(Malaysia) DRB-Hicom F.C.	
Apr 2015	MR/AMR		(Malaysia) D. Christie Jayaseelan	(Malaysia) Felda United F.C.	
Apr 2015	MC/AMC		(Malaysia) Mohd Fadzli Saari	(Malaysia) Sime Darby F.C.	
Apr 2015	AMC/ST		(Malaysia) Norshahrul Idlan Talaha	(Malaysia) Terengganu FA	

== Johor Darul Takzim ==
=== Transfers in ===
Entry date	Position	No	Player	From club	Fee
Nov 2014	GK		(Malaysia) Mohd Farizal Marlias	(Malaysia) Selangor FA	
Nov 2014	DC		(Malaysia) Mohd Amer Saidin	(Malaysia) Harimau Muda A	
Nov 2014	DL/ML		(Malaysia) Mohd Fandi Othman	(Malaysia) Harimau Muda A	
Nov 2014	AMRL		(Malaysia) Suppiah Chanturu	(Malaysia) Sarawak FA	
Nov 2014	DMC		(Malaysia) Junior Eldstål	(Malaysia) Sarawak FA	
Nov 2014	MRL/DRL		(Malaysia) S. Kunanlan	(Malaysia) Selangor FA	
Nov 2014	AMRLC/ST		(Malaysia) Sean Gan Giannelli	(Italy) U.S. Arezzo	
31 March 2015	ST		(Sierra Leone) Alhaji Kamara	(Sweden) IFK Norrköping On Loan	
Apr 2015	AMRLC		(Argentina) Patito Rodríguez	(Brazil) Santos FC On Loan	
Apr 2015	DM/MC		(Malaysia) Gary Steven Robbat	(Malaysia) Free Agents	

=== Transfers out ===
Exit date	Position	No.	Player	To club	Fee
Nov 2014	GK		(Malaysia) Norazlan Razali	(Malaysia) Selangor FA	
Nov 2014	DC		(Malaysia) Azizi Matt Rose	(Malaysia) Negeri Sembilan FA	
Nov 2014	DC		(Malaysia) Kamarul Afiq Kamaruddin	(Malaysia) Johor Darul Ta'zim II F.C.	
Nov 2014	DL		(Malaysia) Mohd Fazly Mazlan	(Malaysia) Johor Darul Ta'zim II F.C.	
Nov 2014	ST		(Malaysia) Norshahrul Idlan Talaha	(Malaysia) ATM FA	
Nov 2014	DCR		(Malaysia) S. Subramaniam	(Malaysia) Selangor FA	

== Kelantan FA ==
=== Transfers in ===
Entry date	Position	No.	Player	From club	Fee
November 2014	GK		(Malaysia) Ahmad Syihan Hazmi Mohamed	(Malaysia) Harimau Muda C	
November 2014	DRC		(Australia) Jonathan McKain	(Australia) Adelaide United FC	
November 2014	DC		(Malaysia) Norhafiz Zamani Misbah	(Malaysia) Negeri Sembilan FA	
November 2014	DRL		(Malaysia) Noor Hazrul Mustafa	(Malaysia) Perak FA	
November 2014	DL		(Malaysia) Mohd Qayyum Marjoni Sabil	(Malaysia) Harimau Muda B	
November 2014	AMR/ST		(Malaysia) Mohd Nor Farhan Muhammad	(Malaysia) Terengganu FA	
November 2014	ST		(Colombia) Erwin Carrillo	(Colombia) Unión Magdalena	
November 2014	ST		(Cameroon) Emmanuel Kenmogne	(Indonesia) Persebaya Surabaya	
November 2014	MC		(Liberia) Isaac Pupo	(Indonesia) Persebaya Surabaya	
26/4/2015	ST		(Brazil) Gilmar	(Brazil) Clube Esportivo Lajeadense	
26/4/2015	ST		(Nigeria) Austin Amutu	(Nigeria) Warri Wolves F.C.On Loan	
28/4/2015	DC/DM		(Malaysia) Amirizdwan Taj Tajuddin	(Malaysia) ATM FA	

=== Transfers out ===
Exit date	Position	No.	Player	To club	Fee
Nov 2014	GK		(Malaysia) Muhammad Fakhrul Ikram Azahari	(Malaysia) Perlis FA	
Nov 2014	DC		(Iraq) Hussein Alaa Hussein	Released	
Nov 2014	DL		(Malaysia) Mohammad Abdul Aziz Ismail	(Malaysia) Pahang FA	
Nov 2014	DR		(Malaysia) Mohamad Faiz Suhaimi	(Malaysia) Malacca United F.C.	
Nov 2014	DMC		(Malaysia) Tengku Hasbullah Raja Hassan	Released	
Nov 2014	DMC		(Egypt) Mohamed Shawky	Released	
Nov 2014	ST		(Ghana) Prince Tagoe	(Israel) Hapoel Bnei Lod F.C.	
Nov 2014	ST		(Malaysia) Ahmad Shakir Mohd Ali	(Malaysia) Kedah FA	
Nov 2014	MR/AMR		(Malaysia) Mohd Akid Ramli	(Malaysia) Felcra F.C.	
Nov 2014	MC		(Malaysia) Mohammad Asif Mohd Azman	(Malaysia) Malacca United F.C.	
Nov 2014	ST/AMR		(Malaysia) Famirul Asyraf Sayuti	(Malaysia) Malacca United F.C.	
26 Apr 2015	ST		(Cameroon) Emmanuel Kenmogne	Released	
26 Apr 2015	DM/MC		(Liberia) Isaac Pupo	Release	
28 Apr 2015	MC/AM		(Malaysia) Mohd Rozaimi Azwar Mat Noor	(Malaysia) Sabah FA On Loan	
28 Apr 2015	DC/DM		(Malaysia) Faizol Nazlin Sayuti	(Malaysia) Sabah FA On Loan	

== Pahang FA ==
=== Transfers in ===
Entry date	Position	No.	Player	From club	Fee
Nov 2014	DLR		(Malaysia) Mohammad Abdul Aziz Ismail	(Malaysia) Kelantan FA	
Nov 2014	MLC/AMLC		(Malaysia) D. Saarvindran	(Malaysia) Harimau Muda A	
Nov 2014	MC		(Malaysia) Muhd Nor Azam Abdul Azih	(Malaysia) Harimau Muda B	
8 Apr 2015	DR		(Malaysia) Matthew Davies	(Australia) Perth Glory FC	

=== Transfers out ===
Exit date	Position	No.	Player	To club	Fee
Nov 2014	DC		(Malaysia) Muhammad Nur Zhafri Zaini	(Malaysia) PDRM FA	
Nov 2014	AMR		(Malaysia) Abdul Malik Mat Ariff	(Malaysia) Kuantan FA (On Loan)	
Nov 2014	MC		(Malaysia) Mohd Faizol Hussien	(Malaysia) Johor Darul Ta'zim II F.C.	
Nov 2014	AML		(Malaysia) Mohd Shahrul Aizad Zulkifli	(Malaysia) Kuantan FA	
Nov 2014	AML/ST		(Malaysia) Mohd Shafizi Mohd Zain	(Malaysia) Real Mulia F.C.	
Nov 2014	ST		(Malaysia) Mohd Azrul Firdaus Kamaruzaman	(Malaysia) Kuala Lumpur FA	

== Perak FA ==
=== Transfers in ===
Entry date	Position	No.	Player	From club	Fee
Nov 2014	GK		(Malaysia) Azizon Abdul Kadir	(Malaysia) PDRM FA	
Nov 2014	GK		(Malaysia) Mohd Zamir Selamat	(Malaysia) PKNS F.C.	
Nov 2014	DRL		(Malaysia) Azmizi Azmi	(Malaysia) Kedah FA	
Nov 2014	DR		(Malaysia) Muhammad Aliff bin Abu Shaari Al-Hiddri	(Malaysia) Perak YBU F.C.	
Nov 2014	DLC		(Malaysia) Muhd Arif Ismail	(Malaysia) Sime Darby F.C.	
Nov 2014	DLC		(Malaysia) Muhd Syazwan Zaipol Bahari	(Malaysia) Harimau Muda B	
Nov 2014	DC		(Malaysia) Muhammad Nor Adib Redzuan	(Malaysia) SSTMI	
Nov 2014	DC		(Brazil) Thiago Junior Aquino	(Vietnam) Đồng Nai F.C.	
Nov 2014	DL		(Malaysia) Sumardi Hajalan	(Malaysia) Negeri Sembilan FA	
Nov 2014	DL/ML		(Malaysia) Mohd Faizal Mansor	(Malaysia) PBAPP FC	
Nov 2014	AMC		(South Korea) Namkung Woong	(Malaysia) Kedah FA	
Nov 2014	AML		(Malaysia) Nurridzuan Abu Hassan	(Malaysia) Harimau Muda A	
Nov 2014	ST		(Brazil) Charles Chad Souza	(Malaysia) PDRM FA	
Nov 2014	ST		(Malaysia) Bobby Gonzales	(Malaysia) PDRM FA	
Nov 2014	ST		(Malaysia) Haris Safwan Kamal	(Malaysia) Felda United F.C.	
Nov 2014	ST		(Malaysia) Suwarnaraj a/l Chinniah	(Malaysia) SSMP	
Nov 2014	ST		(Malaysia) Mohd Amirul Izwan Mohd Baki	(Malaysia) PDRM FA	
Apr 2015	AM/CM		(Jamaica) Horace James	(Canada) FC Edmonton	

=== Transfers out ===
Exit date	Position	No.	Player	To club	Fee
Nov 2014	GK		(Malaysia) Razi Effendi Suhit	(Malaysia) ATM FA	
Nov 2014	GK		(Malaysia) Muhd Fitry Kamal Ariffin	(Malaysia) Kuantan FA	
Nov 2014	GK		(Malaysia) Muhd Hafizul Hakim Khairul Nizam	(Malaysia) Malacca United F.C.	
Nov 2014	GK		(Malaysia) Mohd Nor Haziq Aris	(Malaysia) PKNS F.C.	
Nov 2014	DC		(Malaysia) Mohd Fazli Zulkifli	(Malaysia) Real Mulia F.C.	
Nov 2014	DL		(Malaysia) Mohd Norhizwan Hassan	(Malaysia) Kuantan FA	
Nov 2014	DRL		(Malaysia) Noor Hazrul Mustafa	(Malaysia) Kelantan FA	
Nov 2014	DR		(Malaysia) Muhd Faris Mohd Ariffin	(Malaysia) NS Matrix F.C.	
Nov 2014	DLC		(Malaysia) Azmeer Yusof	(Malaysia) ATM FA	
Nov 2014	DC		(Lebanon) Hassan Daher	Released	
Nov 2014	MC		(Malaysia) Yoganathan a/l Munusamy	(Malaysia) Sabah FA	
Nov 2014	AMLC		(Malaysia) Mohammad Hardi Jaafar	(Malaysia) Perlis FA	
Nov 2014	AMLR		(Malaysia) Partiban a/l K.Janasekaran	(Malaysia) Sarawak FA	
Nov 2014	AMRC		(Malaysia) Mohd Nazri Mohd Kamal	(Malaysia) Sarawak	
Nov 2014	AMR		(Malaysia) Mohd Hidayat Amaruddin	(Malaysia) UiTM F.C.	
Nov 2014	ST		(Malaysia) Razali Umar Kandasamy	Released	
Nov 2014	AML		(Malaysia) Muhammad Zahiruddin Zulkifli	(Malaysia) Malacca United F.C.	
Nov 2014	AML		(Malaysia) Mohamed Faridzuan Yusuf	(Malaysia) UiTM F.C.	
Nov 2014	ST		(Malaysia) Shahrizal Saad	(Malaysia) Negeri Sembilan FA	
Nov 2014	ST		(Nigeria) Abdulafees Abdulsalam	(Malaysia) ATM FA	
Nov 2014	ST		(Montenegro) Milan Purović	(Malaysia) Kuantan FA	
Apr 2015	MC		(Brazil) Marco Tulio	Released	

== Felda United ==
=== Transfers in ===
Entry date	Position	No.	Player	From club	Fee
November 2014	GK		(Malaysia) Mohd Mursyidin Maudoode	(Malaysia) Harimau Muda C	
November 2014	GK		(Malaysia) Muhd Harmizie Zaharudin	(Malaysia) SSTMI	
November 2014	DR		(Malaysia) Mohd Firdaus Faudzi	(Malaysia) Sime Darby F.C.	
November 2014	DR		(Malaysia) Afiq Ahmad Razali	(Malaysia) ATM FA	
November 2014	DC		(Malaysia) Muhammad Mohd Fauzi	(Malaysia) Harimau Muda C	
November 2014	DC		(Malaysia) Johar Adli Joharudin	(Malaysia) Harimau Muda C	
November 2014	DC		(Serbia) Bojan Miladinović	(Uzbekistan) Pakhtakor Tashkent FK	
November 2014	DRC		(Malaysia) Shahrul Mohd Saad	(Malaysia) Harimau Muda A	
November 2014	MC		(Malaysia) Mohd Fauzan Dzulkifli	(Malaysia) PKNS F.C.	
November 2014	MC		(Malaysia) Awangku Mohamad Hamirullizam	(Malaysia) Harimau Muda C	
November 2014	AMRLC/ST		(Malaysia) Muhammad Akmal Farhan Mohd Noor	(Malaysia) Harimau Muda C	
November 2014	MR/AMR		(Malaysia) Shafiq Azreen Sa'ari	(Malaysia) Harimau Muda C	
November 2014	AMLC/ST		(Malaysia) Mohd Ferris Danial	(Malaysia) Harimau Muda A	
November 2014	DL		(Malaysia) Muhammad Naqib Najwan Saufi	(Malaysia) T-Team F.C.	
26 Apr 2015	MR/AMR		(Malaysia) D. Christie Jayaseelan	(Malaysia) ATM FA	
26 Apr 2015	ST		(Brazil) Thiago Augusto	(Bahrain) Manama Club	

=== Transfers out ===
Exit date	Position	No.	Player	To club	Fee
November 2014	GK		(Malaysia) Mohd Aniis Ismail	(Malaysia) Selangor FA	
November 2014	GK		(Malaysia) E. Lohindran	(Malaysia) Megah Murni F.C.	
November 2014	MC		(Malaysia) Som Keat a/l Preseart	(Malaysia) Penang FA	
November 2014	RB		(Malaysia) Mohd Rahman Zabul	(Malaysia) Kuantan FA	
November 2014	RB		(Malaysia) Muhd Farid Azmi	(Malaysia) UiTM F.C.	
November 2014	DC		(Uzbekistan) Yaroslav Krushelnitskiy	Released	
November 2014	DC		(Malaysia) Muhd Ariff Zulkifly	(Malaysia) Real Mulia F.C.	
November 2014	ML/AML		(Malaysia) Muhd Azmi Hamzah	(Malaysia) T-Team F.C.	
November 2014	ML/AML		(Malaysia) Muhd Raim Azmi	(Malaysia) Real Mulia F.C.	
November 2014	MLR/AMLR		(Malaysia) Mohd Raimi Mohd Nor	(Malaysia) Selangor FA (Loan Return)	
November 2014	ML/AML		(Malaysia) K. Thanaraj	(Malaysia) Selangor FA	
November 2014	MR/AMR		(Malaysia) K. Soley	(Malaysia) Kedah FA	
November 2014	ST		(Malaysia) Haris Safwan Kamal	(Malaysia) Perak FA	
November 2014	ST		(Malaysia) Muhd Firdaus Kasim	(Malaysia) NS Matrix F.C.	
November 2014	ST		(Malaysia) Muhd Zaraen Yami	(Malaysia) NS Matrix F.C.	
November 2014	ST		(Malaysia) Mohd Azyu Ikmal Che Mat Nor	(Malaysia) UKM F.C.	
26 Apr 2015	ST		(Liberia) Edward Junior Wilson	Released	

== Sarawak FA ==
=== Transfer In ===
Position	No.	Player	From club	Fee
GK		(Malaysia) Mohd Iqbal Suhaimi	(Malaysia) ATM FA	
DRC		(Malaysia) A. Varathan	(Malaysia) Penang FA	
DC/DMC		(Montenegro) Ivan Fatić	(Montenegro) FK Rudar Pljevlja	
DMC/DC		(Malaysia) G. Mahathevan	(Malaysia) Penang FA	
MC		(Malaysia) Sabri Sahar	(Malaysia) Sabah FA	
AMRC		(Malaysia) Nazri Kamal	(Malaysia) Perak FA	
AMRL		(Malaysia) J. Partiban	(Malaysia) Perak FA	
AMR		(Malaysia) Ikhwan Izzat Jamaludin	(Malaysia) Samarahan FC	
MR/AMR		(Malaysia) Nur Shamie Iszuan Amin	(Malaysia) Putrajaya SPA F.C.	
ST/AM		(Netherlands) Ronald Hikspoors	(Netherlands) MVV Maastricht	
ST		(Republic of Ireland) Billy Mehmet	(Malaysia) Kedah FA	
DC		(Liberia) Patrick Nyema Gerhardt	Free Agents	

=== Transfers out ===
Position	No.	Player	To club	Fee
GK		(Malaysia) Sani Anuar Kamsani	(Malaysia) Penang FA	
DRC		(Malaysia) Mafry Balang	(Malaysia) Penang FA	
DC		(Hungary) Gábor Gyepes	Released	
AMRC		(Malaysia) Lot Abu Hassan	(Malaysia) PDRM FA	
AMR/ST		(Malaysia) Zamri Morshidi	(Malaysia) MOF F.C.	
MC		(Malaysia) Reeshafiq Alwi	Released	
MRC/AMRC		(Malaysia) Mohd Rasyid Aya	(Malaysia) Felda United F.C.	
ML/AML		(Malaysia) Mohd Ibrahim Jobeli	(Malaysia) Putrajaya SPA F.C.	
DMC		(Malaysia) Junior Eldstål	(Malaysia) Johor Darul Ta'zim F.C.	
ML/AML		(Malaysia) Azizan Saperi	Released	
AMLC/ST		(Lebanon) Hassan Al Mohamed	Released	
ST/AMC		(Bosnia and Herzegovina) Muamer Salibašić	Released	
ST		(Malaysia) Akmal Rizal Ahmad Rakhli	(Malaysia) Kedah Malays FA	
ST/AM		(Netherlands) Ronald Hikspoors	Released	
Manager		(Netherlands) Robert Alberts	Released	

== Selangor FA ==
=== Transfers in ===
Position	No.	Player	From club	Fee
GK		(Malaysia) Norazlan Razali	(Malaysia) Johor Darul Ta'zim F.C.	
GK		(Malaysia) Mohd Aniis Ismail	(Malaysia) Felda United F.C.	
GK		(Malaysia) Mohd Faiz Abdul Khalid	(Malaysia) ATM FA	
DR/MR		(Malaysia) Mohd Azrif Nasrulhaq	(Malaysia) Harimau Muda A	
DL		(Malaysia) Zaiful Abdul Hakim	(Malaysia) Harimau Muda A	
DR		(Malaysia) Zain Azraai Sulaiman	(Malaysia) PDRM FA	
DC		(Malaysia) Mohd Azrul Razman	(Malaysia) Kuala Lumpur FA	
DL		(Malaysia) K. Kannan	(Malaysia) Harimau Muda C	
DC		(Australia) Robert Cornthwaite	(South Korea) Jeonnam Dragons	
DCRL		(Malaysia) S. Subramaniam	(Malaysia) Johor Darul Ta'zim F.C.	
MLRC/AMLRC		(Malaysia) Mohd Raimi Mohd Nor	(Malaysia) Felda United F.C.	
MC		(Malaysia) Saiful Ridzuan Selamat	(Malaysia) Harimau Muda A	
MC/AMC		(Brazil) Leandro Dos Santos	(Malaysia) T-Team F.C.	
ML/AML		(Malaysia) K. Thanaraj	(Malaysia) Felda United F.C.	
ML/AML		(Malaysia) Muhd Hardee Shamsuri	(Malaysia) Harimau Muda B	
MC		(Malaysia) Mohd Ridhwan Johan	(Malaysia) Kuala Lumpur FA	
MR/AMR		(Malaysia) Mohd Azamudin Che Rusli	(Malaysia) Felda United F.C.	
MC/AMC		(Malaysia) Mohd Amir Shafiz Mohd Anuar	(Malaysia) Perak YBU F.C.	
ST		(Brazil) Guilherme de Paula Lucrécio	(Moldova) FC Milsami Orhei	
ST		(Malaysia) K. Satish	(Malaysia) Harimau Muda A	
ST		(Malaysia) M. Sugunthan	(Malaysia) MISC-MIFA	

=== Transfers out ===
Position	No.	Player	To club	Fee
GK		(Malaysia) Mohd Farizal Marlias	(Malaysia) Johor Darul Ta'zim F.C.	
GK		(Malaysia) S. Vishnu Ruban Nair	(Malaysia) PKNS F.C.	
GK		(Malaysia) Muhd Solehin Abdul Wahab	(Malaysia) PKNS F.C.	
DC/DMC		(Australia) Steve Pantelidis	Released	
DR		(Malaysia) P. Rajesh	(Malaysia) Kedah FA	
DC		(Malaysia) Muhammad Ali Hanafiah Mohd Zarudin	(Malaysia) PKNS F.C.	
DC		(Malaysia) S. Ragunantharen	(Malaysia) PKNS F.C.	
DL		(Malaysia) Azrizan a/l Dermaraju	(Malaysia) PKNS F.C.	
DC		(Brazil) Evaldo Silva dos Santos	Released	
MC		(Malaysia) Abdul Shukur Jusoh	(Malaysia) ATM FA	
MRL/AMRL		(Malaysia) Khushairi Aizad Jamalludin	(Malaysia) AirAsia F.C.	
DM/MC		(Malaysia) Muhd Afiq Uzair Baharom	(Malaysia) PKNS F.C.	
MR/AMR		(Malaysia) Thivagar a/l Rajendran	(Malaysia) PKNS F.C.	
AMR/DR		(Malaysia) S. Kunanlan	(Malaysia) Johor Darul Ta'zim F.C.	
ST		(Brazil) Paulo Rangel	(Malaysia) Terengganu FA	
ST		(Malaysia) Muhd Nor Ubaidullah Abdul Rahman	(Malaysia) PKNS F.C.	
ST		(Malaysia) Ibrahim Syaihul	(Malaysia) PKNS F.C.	
ST		(Malaysia) Mohd Azhar Hassan	(Malaysia) PKNS F.C.	
ST		(Malaysia) Darshen Ganesan Pillay	(Malaysia) PKNS F.C.	

== Sime Darby FC ==
=== Transfers in ===
Entry date	Position	No.	Player	From club	Fee
Nov 2014	GK		(Malaysia) Mohd Faridzuean Kamaruddin	(Malaysia) Harimau Muda C	
Nov 2014	GK		(Malaysia) Mohd Fiqri Roslee	(Malaysia) Sarawak FA	
Nov 2014	MC		(Malaysia) Mohd Helmi Hariri Ibrahim	(Malaysia) Kuala Lumpur FA	
Nov 2014	DC		(Malaysia) Faiz Mohd Bandong	(Malaysia) ATM FA	
Nov 2014	DC		(Malaysia) Syed Ismail Syed Ibrahim	(Malaysia) Kuala Lumpur FA	
Nov 2014	DR		(Malaysia) Wan Mohammed Afiq Wan Mohamed Kasbi	(Malaysia) UKM F.C.	
Nov 2014	MR/AMR		(Malaysia) Gusti Ishak Fitri Shah Said	(Malaysia) Kuala Lumpur FA	
Nov 2014	ML/AML		(Malaysia) Tharvinaldo Naidu a/l R.Selvasingam	(Malaysia) ATM FA	
Nov 2014	MC		(Malaysia) Saiful Hasnol Mohd Raffi	(Malaysia) UKM F.C.	
Nov 2014	DC		(Malaysia) Muhammad Farhan Hazmi Mohd Nasir	(Malaysia) Kuala Lumpur FA	
Nov 2014	MC/AMC		(Malaysia) Muhammad Azri Zulkiflee	(Malaysia) Kuala Lumpur FA	
Nov 2014	DL		(Malaysia) Muhamad Hafiz Zalani	(Malaysia) UKM F.C.	
Nov 2014	DL		(Malaysia) Tengku Qayyum Ubaidillah Tengku Ahmad	(Malaysia) Negeri Sembilan FA	
Nov 2014	DR/DMC		(Malaysia) Mohd Alif Shamsudin	(Malaysia) Negeri Sembilan FA	
Nov 2014	DCL		(Serbia) Ivan Dragičević	(Montenegro) FK Mogren	
Nov 2014	DR		(Malaysia) Chairi Emmir Solehaddin	(Malaysia) Kuala Lumpur FA (Loan Return)	
Nov 2014	MRC/AMRC		(Malaysia) Eddy Helmi Abdul Manan	(Malaysia) Negeri Sembilan FA	
Nov 2014	MC		(Malaysia) Abdul Halim Zainal	(Malaysia) Negeri Sembilan FA	
Nov 2014	ML/AML		(Malaysia) Mohd Shoufiq Khusaini	(Malaysia) Negeri Sembilan FA	
Nov 2014	DM/MC		(Malaysia) Mohd Hafiszuan Salehuddin	(Malaysia) Putrajaya SPA F.C.	
Nov 2014	ML/AML		(Malaysia) Khairul Anwar Shahrudin	(Malaysia) DRB-Hicom F.C.	
Nov 2014	MCL/AMCL		(Serbia) Marko Perović	(Serbia) FK Radnički 1923	
Nov 2014	ST		(Malaysia) Muhd Hadzirun Che Hamid	(Malaysia) Kuala Lumpur FA (Loan Return)	
Nov 2014	ST		(Malaysia) Mohd Firdaus Azizul	(Malaysia) Negeri Sembilan FA	
Nov 2014	ST		(Malaysia) Mohd Nizad Ayub	(Malaysia) T-Team F.C.	
Nov 2014	ST		(Malaysia) Faiz Hanif Adenan	(Malaysia) Kedah FA	
Nov 2014	ST		(Malaysia) Muhd Rijal Fiqry Yusoff	(Malaysia) UKM F.C.	
Nov 2014	ST		(Serbia) Nemanja Vidaković	(Serbia) FK Novi Pazar	
Apr 2015	MC/AMC		(Malaysia) Mohd Fadzli Saari	(Malaysia) ATM FA	
Apr 2015	AM/ST		(Australia) Reinaldo Elias da Costa	(Brazil) Sociedade Esportiva e Recreativa Caxias do Sul	

=== Transfers out ===
Exit date	Position	No.	Player	To club	Fee
Nov 2014	DC		(Malaysia) Ahmad Haziq Ahmad Fuad	(Malaysia) UiTM F.C.	
Nov 2014	DC		(Ghana) William Mensah	Released	
Nov 2014	DLC		(Malaysia) Muhd Arif Ismail	(Malaysia) Perak FA	
Nov 2014	DC		(Malaysia) Fairuz Abdul Aziz	(Malaysia) Kuala Lumpur FA	
Nov 2014	DR		(Malaysia) Mohd Firdaus Faudzi	(Malaysia) Felda United F.C.	
Nov 2014	DL		(Malaysia) Mohd Farid Ramli	(Malaysia) Penang FA	
Nov 2014	MC		(Malaysia) Mohd Asrol Ibrahim	(Malaysia) T-Team F.C.	
Nov 2014	MC		(Malaysia) Syed Ariff Syed Uzir	(Malaysia) UiTM F.C. (On Loan)	
Nov 2014	AMC/ST		(Malaysia) Mohd Fadzli Saari	(Malaysia) ATM FA	
Nov 2014	AMRL		(Malaysia) Fazrul Hazli Kadri	(Malaysia) ATM FA	
Nov 2014	AMC		(Syria) Mahmoud Amnah	Released	
Nov 2014	AML		(Malaysia) Muhd Izuan Salahuddin	(Malaysia) Sabah FA	
Nov 2014	DMC		(Malaysia) Mohd Syukur Saidin	(Malaysia) Penang FA	
Nov 2014	ST		(Malaysia) Muhammad Asnan Awal Hisham	(Malaysia) Kuantan FA	
Nov 2014	ST		(Ghana) Wisdom Agblexo	Released	
Nov 2014	ST		(Malaysia) Failee Ghazli	(Malaysia) Penang FA	
Nov 2014	ST		(Malaysia) Mohd Farderin Kadir	(Malaysia) PKNS F.C.	
Nov 2014	ST		(Malaysia) Muhammad Shafiq Jamal	(Malaysia) Sabah FA	
Nov 2014	ST		(Croatia) Mateo Roskam	(Singapore) Tampines Rovers FC	
Apr 2015	MC		(Uzbekistan) Dilshod Sharofetdinov	Released	

== LionsXII ==
=== Transfers in ===
Entry date	Position	No.	Player	From club	Fee
Nov 2014	GK		(Singapore) Muhammad Zharfan Bin Rohaizad	Singapore Cubs	
Nov 2014	DC		(Singapore) Muhammad Zakir Samsudin	Singapore Cubs	
Nov 2014	DL		(Singapore) Wahyudi Wahid	(Singapore) Hougang United FC	
Nov 2014	DC		(Singapore) Faris Azienuddin	(Singapore) Young Lions FC	
Nov 2014	MC		(Singapore) Muhd Izzdin Shafiq Yacob	(Singapore) Home United FC	
Nov 2014	MF		(Singapore) Shahdan Sulaiman	(Singapore) Tampines Rovers FC	
Nov 2014	MF		(Singapore) Christopher van Huizen	(Singapore) Tampines Rovers FC	
Nov 2014	ST		(Singapore) Sahil Suhaimi	(Singapore) Young Lions FC	

=== Transfers out ===
Exit date	Position	No.	Player	To club	Fee
Nov 2014	DLC		(Singapore) Shakir Hamzah	(Singapore) Young Lions FC	
Nov 2014	MF		(Singapore) Aqhari Abdullah	(Singapore) Tampines Rovers FC	
Nov 2014	MF		(Singapore) Ignatius Ang	(Singapore) Balestier Khalsa FC	
Nov 2014	DF		(Singapore) Emmeric Ong	(Singapore) Warriors FC	
Nov 2014	DC		(Singapore) Baihakki Khaizan	(Malaysia) Johor Darul Ta'zim II F.C.	
Nov 2014	GK		(Singapore) Abdul Qadir Yusoff	(Singapore) Released	
Nov 2014	DC		(Singapore) Muhd Faliq Sudhir	(Singapore) Released	
Nov 2014	ST		(Singapore) Shahfiq Ghani	(Singapore) Young Lions FC	

== Terengganu FA ==
=== Transfers in ===
Entry date	Position	No.	Player	From club	Fee
Nov 2014	DC		(Malaysia) Abdullah Suleiman	(Malaysia) Harimau Muda B	
Nov 2014	DRC/DM		(Malaysia) Helmi Remeli	(Malaysia) PKNS F.C.	
Nov 2014	DL		(Malaysia) Mohd Sukri Faiz Abdullah	(Malaysia) Hanelang F.C.	
Nov 2014	AMC/ST		(Lebanon) Hassan Chaito	(Bahrain) Al-Shabab Club (Manama)	
Nov 2014	AMC		(Argentina) Gustavo Fabián López	(Indonesia) Arema Cronus	
Nov 2014	MC		(Malaysia) Muhd Shahrin Sapien	(Malaysia) T-Team F.C.	
Nov 2014	ST		(Brazil) Paulo Rangel	(Malaysia) Selangor FA	
1 Apr 2015	MRL/AMRL		(Canada) Issey Nakajima-Farran	(Spain) CF Suburense	
17 Apr 2015	ST/AM		(Malaysia) Norshahrul Idlan Talaha	(Malaysia) ATM FA	

=== Transfers out ===
Exit date	Position	No.	Player	To club	Fee
Nov 2014	GK		(Malaysia) Muhd Saifuddin Mokhtar	(Malaysia) Hanelang F.C.	
Nov 2014	DC		(Malaysia) Muhd Safix Ibrahim	(Malaysia) Hanelang F.C.	
Nov 2014	ST		(Malaysia) Mohd Faidzol Fazreen Shamsudin	(Malaysia) Felcra F.C.	
Nov 2014	ML/AML		(Malaysia) Mohd Hasyidan Nafie Hamid	(Malaysia) Hanelang F.C.	
Nov 2014	DR		(Malaysia) Mohd Fakarudin Musa	Released	
Nov 2014	MRC		(Malaysia) Mohd Shafiq Azman	(Malaysia) Felcra F.C.	
Nov 2014	ML/AML		(Malaysia) D. Adrian	Released	
Nov 2014	AMRL		(Malaysia) Fazreen Ismail	Released	
Nov 2014	DR		(Malaysia) Rahmat Hassan	(Malaysia) Felcra F.C.	
Nov 2014	DRLC		(Malaysia) Mazlizam Mohamad	(Malaysia) Penang FA	
Nov 2014	AMR/ST		(Malaysia) Nor Farhan Muhammad	(Malaysia) Kelantan FA	
Nov 2014	MC		(Malaysia) Amirul Dzulkarnain Rawi	(Malaysia) Hanelang F.C.	
Nov 2014	DM/MC		(Malaysia) Tengku Azizol Tengku Adnan	(Malaysia) Hanelang F.C.	
Nov 2014	MC		(Australia) Mario Karlović	(Malaysia) ATM FA	
Nov 2014	AMLR		(Malaysia) Nor Hakim Hassan	(Malaysia) T-Team F.C.	
Nov 2014	AMLC		(Malaysia) Mohd Faiz Subri	(Malaysia) Penang FA	
Nov 2014	AMC/ST		(Senegal) Moustapha Dabo	Released	
Nov 2014	ST		(Colombia) Javier Estupiñán	Released	
Nov 2014	ST		(Malaysia) Mohd Zawawi Mat Arif	(Malaysia) Hanelang F.C.	
Nov 2014	DL		(Malaysia) Khairol Anuar Mazlan	(Malaysia) T-Team F.C.	
1 Feb 2015	ST/AM		(Lebanon) Hassan Chaito	Released	
1 Apr 2015	ST		(Malaysia) Izzaq Faris Ramlan	(Malaysia) T-Team F.C. (On loan)	
1 Apr 2015	GK		(Malaysia) Muhd Izzuddin Muhamat Hussin	(Malaysia) T-Team F.C. (On loan)	

== PDRM FA ==
=== Transfers in ===
Entry date	Position	No.	Player	From club	Fee
Nov 2014	GK		(Malaysia) Saiful Amar Sudar	(Malaysia) Kedah FA	
Nov 2014	GK		(Malaysia) Badrulzaman Abdul Halim	(Malaysia) Negeri Sembilan FA	
Nov 2014	DRC		(Malaysia) Muhd Eskandar Ismail	(Malaysia)	
Nov 2014	DC		(Nigeria) Onorionde Kughegbe	(Indonesia) Persebaya Surabaya	
Nov 2014	AMRC		(Malaysia) Shahurain Abu Samah	(Malaysia) PKNS F.C.	
Nov 2014	AMC		(Malaysia) Muhd Asyidi Dil Ashar Yusof	(Malaysia) Putrajaya SPA F.C.	
Nov 2014	AML		(Malaysia) Isma Alif Mohd Salim	(Malaysia) Sabah FA	
Nov 2014	AMLC		(Malaysia) Nurul Azwan Roya	(Malaysia) Johor Darul Ta'zim F.C.	
Nov 2014	AMRC		(Malaysia) Mohd Faizal Abu Bakar	(Malaysia) Kedah FA	
Nov 2014	AMRC		(Malaysia) Lot Abu Hassan	(Malaysia) Sarawak FA	
Nov 2014	ST		(Malaysia) Haziq Fikri Hussein	(Malaysia) Kuantan FA (Loan Return)	
Nov 2014	ST		(Mali) Dramane Traoré	Free Agents	
Nov 2014	DL		(Malaysia) Mohd Shafiq Rosdi	(Malaysia) Kedah FA	
Nov 2014	DL		(Malaysia) Muhd Farhan Abdul Hamid	(Malaysia) Kuala Lumpur FA	
Nov 2014	DC		(Malaysia) Muhd Nur Zhafri Zaini	(Malaysia) Kedah FA	
Nov 2014	DC		(Malaysia) Osman Damanhuri	(Malaysia) Perak FA	
Nov 2014	MC		(Malaysia) Muhd Amirul Abas	(Malaysia) Kuala Lumpur FA	
Nov 2014	MR/AMR		(Malaysia) Mohd Syafiq Redzuan Mohd Pauzee	(Malaysia) Kedah FA	
Nov 2014	ST		(Malaysia) Nur Fahmi Mohd Pauzee	(Malaysia) Kuala Lumpur FA	
Nov 2014	ST		(Malaysia) Nur Saiful Abdul Rahman	(Malaysia) Perak FA	
26 Apr 2015	ML/AML		(Portugal) Jaime Bragança	(Brazil) Vila Nova Futebol Clube	

=== Transfers out ===
Exit date	Position	No.	Player	To club	Fee
Nov 2014	GK		(Malaysia) Mohd Amirul Asraf Mohd Noor	(Malaysia) Felcra F.C.	
Nov 2014	GK		(Malaysia) Azizon Abdul Kadir	(Malaysia) Perak FA	
Nov 2014	GK		(Malaysia) Mohd Helmi Eliza Elias	(Malaysia) Negeri Sembilan FA	
Nov 2014	DC		(Brazil) Rafael Souza Silva Novais	Released	
Nov 2014	DRL/DMC		(Malaysia) Mohd Sabre Mat Abu	(Malaysia) Kedah FA	
Nov 2014	DR		(Malaysia) Zain Azraai Sulaiman	(Malaysia) Selangor FA	
Nov 2014	DC		(Malaysia) Abdul Halim Harun	(Malaysia) MOF F.C.	
Nov 2014	MC		(Malaysia) Azi Shahril Azmi	(Malaysia) Perlis FA	
Nov 2014	AMR		(Malaysia) Mohd Hazuan Mohd Daud	(Malaysia) Kuantan FA	
Nov 2014	AMR		(Malaysia) Mohd Shahril Izwan Abdullah	(Malaysia) Released	
Nov 2014	MRL/AMRL		(Malaysia) Muhd Fakhri Mohd Zain	(Malaysia) Kedah FA	
Nov 2014	MC		(Malaysia) Muhd Asraf Roslan	(Malaysia) NS Matrix F.C.	
Nov 2014	MC		(Malaysia) Wan Zaman Wan Mustapha	(Malaysia) MOF F.C.	
Nov 2014	AMLC		(Malaysia) Munir Amran	(Malaysia) PKNS F.C.	
Nov 2014	MC		(Malaysia) Mohd Fazilidin Khalid	(Malaysia) Kuala Lumpur FA	
Nov 2014	ST		(Brazil) Charles Chad Souza	(Malaysia) Perak FA	
Nov 2014	AMC/ST		(Malaysia) Bobby Gonzales	(Malaysia) Perak FA	
Nov 2014	ST		(Malaysia) Mohd Saufi Ibrahim	(Malaysia) Kuala Lumpur FA	
Nov 2014	ST		(Malaysia) Muhd Amirul Izwan Mohd Baki	(Malaysia) Perak FA	
26 Apr 2015	DC		(Nigeria) Onorionde Kughegbe	Released]	

== Malaysia Premier League ==
The 2015 Malaysia Premier League is the eleventh season of the second division in the Malaysian football league since its establishment in 2004.

FAM allow four foreign players quota starts season 2015, and one must be from Asian countries.

== Kuantan FA ==
=== Transfers in ===
Entry date	Position	No.	Player	From club	Fee
Nov 2014	GK		(Malaysia) Judtanna a/l Eh Put	(Malaysia) Johor Darul Ta'zim II F.C.	
Nov 2014	GK		(Malaysia) Mohamad Fitry bin Kamal Ariffin	(Malaysia) Perak FA	
Nov 2014	DRL		(Malaysia) Mohd Rahman Zabul	(Malaysia) Felda United F.C.	
Nov 2014	DR		(Malaysia) Muszaki Abu Bakar	(Malaysia) Negeri Sembilan FA	
Nov 2014	DL		(Malaysia) Muhamad Norhizwan Hassan	(Malaysia) Perak FA	
Nov 2014	DC		(Malaysia) Muhammad Firdaus Paris@Daris	(Malaysia) UiTM F.C.	
Nov 2014	DC		(South Korea) Lee Kwang-hyun	(Malaysia) Penang FA	
Nov 2014	AMR		(Malaysia) Mohd Hazuan Daud	(Malaysia) PDRM FA	
Nov 2014	AMRL		(Malaysia) Abdul Malik Mat Ariff	(Malaysia) Pahang FA	
Nov 2014	AML		(Malaysia) Mohd Shahrul Aizad Zulkifli	(Malaysia) Pahang FA	
Nov 2014	AML/DL		(Malaysia) Muhammad Afif Asyraf Mohd Zabawi	(Malaysia) UiTM F.C.	
Nov 2014	MC		(Malaysia) Mohd Hanifuddin Abdul Rahman	(Malaysia) Putrajaya SPA F.C.	
Nov 2014	MC		(Morocco) Tarik El Janaby	(Bahrain) Manama Club	
Nov 2014	DMC		(Malaysia) Muhammad Fikri Elhan	(Malaysia) Putrajaya SPA F.C.	
Nov 2014	AMLC		(Malaysia) Nurfahmie Hadzrin Nordin	(Malaysia) Putrajaya SPA F.C.	
Nov 2014	ST		(Montenegro) Milan Purović	(Malaysia) Perak FA	
Nov 2014	ST		(South Korea) Im Kyung-hyun	(South Korea) Chunnam Dragons	
Nov 2014	ST		(Malaysia) Muhamad Razren Mohd Jesni	(Malaysia) UiTM F.C.	
Nov 2014	ST		(Malaysia) Muhammad Zamri Hasan	(Malaysia) PBAPP FC	
Nov 2014	ST		(Malaysia) Muhammad Asnan bin Awal Hisham	(Malaysia) Sime Darby F.C.	
Apr 2015	ST		(Haiti) Fabrice Noel	(Singapore) Tampines Rovers FC	

=== Transfers out ===
Exit date	Position	No.	Player	To club	Fee
Nov 2014	GK		(Malaysia) Muhd Adam Afiq Yusof	Released	
Nov 2014	GK		(Malaysia) Mohd Firdaus Bolkhiah Azmin	Released	
Nov 2014	DR		(Malaysia) Mohd Shafiae Mat	Released	
Nov 2014	DCL		(Malaysia) Amirullah Abd Razab	(Malaysia) Real Mulia F.C.	
Nov 2014	DLC		(Malaysia) Mohd Humaidi Azmi	Released	
Nov 2014	DR		(Malaysia) Muhd Zarrin Asyraff Mohd Nazri	(Malaysia) UKM F.C.	
Nov 2014	DLC		(Malaysia) Ahmad Abdul Fattah Abdullah	Released	
Nov 2014	ML/AML		(Malaysia) Mohd Nurfirdaus Roswanan	(Malaysia) MOF F.C.	
Nov 2014	DMC/MC		(Malaysia) Wan Muhd Firdaus Wan Demi	(Malaysia) Hanelang F.C.	
Nov 2014	MC		(Malaysia) Mohd Khairul Jasri Salleh	Released	
Nov 2014	MR/AMR		(Malaysia) Saravanan A/L S Rarajam	Released	
Nov 2014	MC		(Malaysia) Mohd Saddam Hussein Abdul Rahman	Released	
Nov 2014	MR/AMR		(Malaysia) Muhd Zul Helmi Jamaluddin	Released	
Nov 2014	MR/AMR/ST		(Malaysia) Mohd Supian Heri	(Malaysia) Megah Murni F.C.	
Nov 2014	ST		(Malaysia) Mohd Farizal Mohd Nor	Released	
Nov 2014	AML/ST		(Malaysia) Anas Rahimi Mohd Nor	Released	
Nov 2014	ST		(Malaysia) Abdul Rahman Abdul Kadir	Released	
Nov 2014	ST		(Malaysia) Mohd Fahmi Izzuddin Mohd Zuki	(Malaysia) Hanelang F.C.	
Nov 2014	ST		(Malaysia) Haziq Fikri Hussein	(Malaysia) PDRM FA (Loan return)	
Apr 2015	ST		(South Korea) Im Kyung-hyun	Released	

== Johor Darul Takzim II ==
=== Transfers in ===
Entry date	Position	No.	Player	From club	Fee
Nov 2014	DC		(Singapore) Baihakki Khaizan	(Singapore) LionsXII	
Nov 2014	GK		(Malaysia) Afiff Aizad Azman	(Malaysia) UiTM F.C.	
Nov 2014	DC		(Malaysia) Kamarul Afiq Kamaruddin	(Malaysia) Johor Darul Ta'zim F.C.	
Nov 2014	DLC		(Malaysia) Mohd Irfan Abdul Ghani	(Malaysia) T-Team F.C.	
Nov 2014	DL		(Malaysia) Muhd Fazly Mazlan	(Malaysia) Johor Darul Ta'zim F.C.	
Nov 2014	MC		(Malaysia) Mohd Irfan Fazail	(Malaysia) Johor Darul Ta'zim F.C.	
Nov 2014	MC		(Malaysia) Mohd Faizol Hussien	(Malaysia) Pahang FA	
Nov 2014	MC		(Malaysia) Mohd Afiq Fazail	(Malaysia) Harimau Muda B	
Nov 2014	MR/AMR		(Malaysia) Ramzi Haziq Mohamad	(Malaysia) Harimau Muda B	
Nov 2014	AML/ST		(Argentina) Leandro Velázquez	(Argentina) Club Atlético Vélez Sarsfield	
26 Apr 2015	GK		(Malaysia) Zulfadhli Mohamed	(Malaysia) Johor Darul Ta'zim III F.C.	
26 Apr 2015	DL/ML		(Malaysia) Mohd Fandi Othman	(Malaysia) Johor Darul Ta'zim F.C.	
26 Apr 2015	MC		(Malaysia) Mohd Hazsyafiq Hamzah	(Malaysia) Free Agents	

=== Transfers out ===
Exit date	Position	No.	Player	To club	Fee
Nov 2014	DR		(Malaysia) Mohd Afiq Mohd Amin	(Malaysia) Johor Darul Ta'zim III F.C.	
Nov 2014	GK		(Malaysia) Mohd Syafizullah Abdul Wahab	(Malaysia) Johor Darul Ta'zim III F.C.	
Nov 2014	GK		(Malaysia) Judtanna Eh Put	(Malaysia) Kuantan FA	
Nov 2014	GK		(Malaysia) Zulfadhli Mohamed	(Malaysia) Johor Darul Ta'zim III F.C.	
Nov 2014	DC/DMC		(Spain) Juan Manuel Carrasco	Released	
Nov 2014	DR		(Malaysia) Rozaiman Roslan	(Malaysia) Johor Darul Ta'zim III F.C.	
Nov 2014	DC		(Malaysia) Hairul Nizam Hanif	(Malaysia) Released	
Nov 2014	DLC		(Malaysia) Hardy Charles Parsi	(Malaysia) Sabah FA	
Nov 2014	DC		(Malaysia) Rizal Ismail	(Malaysia) Released	
Nov 2014	DL/ML		(Malaysia) Muhd Zameer Zainun	(Malaysia) Kuala Lumpur FA	
Nov 2014	MC		(Malaysia) See Kok Luen	(Malaysia) Penang FA	
Nov 2014	MC		(Malaysia) Mohd Hazsyafiq Hamzah	Released	
Nov 2014	MC/AMC		(Malaysia) Mohd Yusof Zainal Abidin	Released	
Nov 2014	MR/AMR		(Malaysia) Shahrudin Yakup	(Malaysia) kuala Lumpur FA	
Nov 2014	AML/ST		(Malaysia) Mohd Azinee Taib	(Malaysia) Penang FA	
Nov 2014	ST		(Spain) Braulio Nóbrega	(Spain) Recreativo de Huelva	
Nov 2014	ST		(Malaysia) Muhammad Nursalam Zainal Abidin	(Malaysia) UiTM F.C.	
Nov 2014	ST		(Malaysia) Khairul Azahar Eidros	(Malaysia) AirAsia F.C.	
Nov 2014	ST		(Malaysia) Mohd Rafie Mohd Rahim	Released	
Nov 2014	AMC/ST		(Malaysia) Fandi Ahmad	(Malaysia) Johor Darul Ta'zim III F.C.	
26 Apr 2015	GK		(Malaysia) Mohd Anis Faron	Released	

== Kedah FA ==
=== Transfer in ===
Entry date	Position	No.	Player	From club	Fee
Nov 2014	GK		(Malaysia) Mohd Firdaus Muhamad	(Malaysia) Harimau Muda A	
Nov 2014	DRL/DMC		(Malaysia) Mohd Sabre Mat Abu	(Malaysia) PDRM FA	
Nov 2014	DC/DMC		(Malaysia) Lew Han Hung	(Malaysia) Penang FA	
Nov 2014	DC/ST		(South Korea) Bang Seung-Hwan	(Malaysia) UiTM F.C.	
Nov 2014	DC		(Kenya) Lawrence Olum	(United States) Sporting Kansas City	
Nov 2014	DRC		(Malaysia) Mohd Raphi Azizan Mariappen	(Malaysia) Harimau Muda C	
Nov 2014	DR		(Malaysia) P. Rajesh	(Malaysia) Selangor FA	
Nov 2014	DLC		(Malaysia) Mohd Akmal Chin	(Malaysia) Harimau Muda B	
Nov 2014	MRC/AMRC		(Malaysia) Shazuan Ashraf Mathews	(Malaysia) Penang FA	
Nov 2014	MR/AMR		(Malaysia) Solehin Kanasian Abdullah	(Malaysia) Felda United F.C.	
Nov 2014	ML/AML		(Malaysia) Syazuan Hazani	(Malaysia) ATM FA	
Nov 2014	MLR/AMLR		(Malaysia) Muhd Fakhri Mohd Zain	(Malaysia) PDRM FA	
Nov 2014	ST		(Malaysia) Ahmad Shakir Mohd Ali	(Malaysia) Kelantan FA	
Nov 2014	ST		(Liberia) Keith Murtu Nah	(Myanmar) Chin United F.C.	
Nov 2014	ST		(Nigeria) Chidi Edeh	(Nigeria) Enugu Rangers	
9 Apr 2015	MC		(Albania) Liridon Krasniqi	Free Agents	
9 Apr 2015	MC/AMC		(Brazil) Sandro da Silva Mendonça	(Brazil) Operário Ferroviário Esporte Clube	
Apr 2015	DLR		(Malaysia) Mohd Alif Fadhil Ismail	(Malaysia) Sungai Ara F.C.	

=== Transfers out ===
Exit date	Position	No.	Player	To club	Fee
Nov 2014	GK		(Malaysia) Saiful Amar Sudar	(Malaysia) PDRM FA	
Nov 2014	GK		(Malaysia) Mohd Muhaimin Mohamad	(Malaysia) Kuala Lumpur FA	
Nov 2014	DR		(Malaysia) Mohd Ridzuan Rumlee	(Malaysia) Kedah Malays FA	
Nov 2014	DC		(Malaysia) Fariss Azlan Mat Isa	(Malaysia) Kuala Lumpur FA	
Nov 2014	DRL/DMC		(Malaysia) Azmizi Azmi	(Malaysia) Perak FA	
Nov 2014	Fitness Coach		(Malaysia) Shahrul Ezrain Shamsudin	(Malaysia) Hanelang F.C.	
Nov 2014	DC		(Australia) Adam Griffiths	Released	
Nov 2014	DC/DMC		(Spain) José Franco Gómez	Released	
Nov 2014	DC		(Malaysia) Visert Sorrachak a/l Seng Kiang	(Malaysia) Kuala Lumpur FA	
Nov 2014	DRC		(Malaysia) Mohd Fazliata Taib	(Malaysia) Negeri Sembilan FA	
Nov 2014	AMLC		(Malaysia) Namkung Woong	(Malaysia) Perak FA	
Nov 2014	AML		(Malaysia) Muhammad Ivaan Hakimi Abdullah@Ivaan Por Kean Hai	(Malaysia) Kedah Malays FA	
Nov 2014	ML/AML		(Malaysia) Abdul Muiz Abdul Talib	(Malaysia) UKM F.C.	
Nov 2014	MRC/AMRC		(Malaysia) Mohd Faizal Abu Bakar	(Malaysia) PDRM FA	
Nov 2014	MRC/AMRC		(Malaysia) Zuraindey Jumai	(Malaysia) Sabah FA	
Nov 2014	ST		(Republic of Ireland) Billy Mehmet	(Malaysia) Sarawak FA	
Nov 2014	AMRLC/ST		(Malaysia) Khyril Muhymeen Zambri	(Malaysia) Negeri Sembilan FA	
Nov 2014	ST		(Malaysia) Syamim Alif Sobri	(Malaysia) Kedah Malays FA	

== Negeri Sembilan FA ==
=== Transfers in ===
Entry date	Position	No.	Player	From club	Fee
Nov 2014	Manager		(Malaysia) K. Devan	(Malaysia) Penang FA	
Nov 2014	GK		(Malaysia) Helmi Eliza Elias	(Malaysia) PDRM FA	
Nov 2014	DLC		(Malaysia) Irwan Fadzli Idrus	(Malaysia) ATM FA	
Nov 2014	DC		(Malaysia) Arvind Juresinggam	(Malaysia) ATM FA	
Nov 2014	DC		(Malaysia) Azizi Matt Rose	(Malaysia) Johor Darul Ta'zim F.C.	
Nov 2014	DRC		(Malaysia) Mohd Fazliata Taib	(Malaysia) Kedah FA	
Nov 2014	MC/DMC		(Malaysia) Rezal Zambery Yahya	(Malaysia) ATM FA	
Nov 2014	MC		(Malaysia) Ahmad Fauzi Saari	(Malaysia) ATM FA	
Nov 2014	MC/AMC		(Argentina) Bruno Martelotto	(Malaysia) ATM FA	
Nov 2014	ML/AML		(Malaysia) Mohd Akmal Mohd Noor	(Malaysia) ATM FA	
Nov 2014	AMRLC/ST		(Malaysia) Khyril Muhymeen Zambri	(Malaysia) Kedah FA	
Nov 2014	ST		(Malaysia) Shahrizal Saad	(Malaysia) Perak FA	
Nov 2014	ST		(Liberia) Francis Forkey Doe	(Malaysia) Kelantan FA	
Nov 2014	ST		(Malaysia) Rudie Ramli	(Malaysia) ATM FA	
Nov 2014	ST		(Malaysia) Sean Eugene Selvaraj	(Malaysia) Harimau Muda C	

=== Transfers out ===
Exit date	Position	No.	Player	To club	Fee
Nov 2014	Manager		(Singapore) V. Sundramoorthy	(Singapore) Tampines Rovers FC	
Nov 2014	GK		(Malaysia) Badrulzaman Abdul Halim	(Malaysia) PDRM FA	
Nov 2014	GK		(Malaysia) Azwan Azrul Anuar	(Malaysia) DRB-Hicom F.C.	
Nov 2014	DL/WBL/ML		(Malaysia) Tengku Qayyum	(Malaysia) Sime Darby F.C.	
Nov 2014	DC/DMC		(Malaysia) Norhafiz Zamani Misbah	(Malaysia) Kelantan FA	
Nov 2014	DC/DMC		(Malaysia) K. Nanthakumar	(Malaysia) MISC-MIFA	
Nov 2014	DR/DMC		(Malaysia) Mohd Alif Shamsudin	(Malaysia) Sime Darby F.C.	
Nov 2014	DR/MR		(Malaysia) Mohd Nizam Abu Bakar	(Malaysia) PKNS F.C.	
Nov 2014	DL/WBL		(Malaysia) Sumardi Hajalan	(Malaysia) Perak FA	
Nov 2014	DL/WBL		(Malaysia) Mohd Zulfaizham Kamis	(Malaysia) Kedah Malays FA	
Nov 2014	DR/WBR		(Malaysia) Muszaki Abu Bakar	(Malaysia) Kuantan FA	
Nov 2014	MC		(Malaysia) Abdul Halim Zainal	(Malaysia) Sime Darby F.C.	
Nov 2014	MRC/AMRC		(Malaysia) Eddy Helmi Abdul Manan	(Malaysia) Sime Darby F.C.	
Nov 2014	MLR/AMLR		(Malaysia) Mohd Shoufiq Khusaini	(Malaysia) Sime Darby F.C.	
Nov 2014	MC/DMC		(Malaysia) M. Sivakumar	(Malaysia) PKNS F.C.	
April 2014	ST		(Cameroon) Jean-Emmanuel Effa Owona	Released	
Nov 2014	AMR/ST		(Malaysia) Mohd Firdaus Azizul	(Malaysia) Sime Darby F.C.	
Nov 2014	ST		(Croatia) Ivan Babić	(Malaysia) DRB-Hicom F.C.	
Nov 2014	ST		(South Africa) Philani	Released	

== Kuala Lumpur FA ==
=== Transfers in ===
Entry date	Position	No.	Player	From club	Fee
Nov 2014	GK		(Malaysia) Mohd Muhaimin Mohamad	(Malaysia) Kedah FA	
Nov 2014	GK		(Malaysia) Badrol Hanapi Ali	(Malaysia) Megah Murni F.C.	
Nov 2014	DC		(Malaysia) Fairuz Abdul Aziz	(Malaysia) Sime Darby F.C.	
Nov 2014	DL/ML		(Malaysia) Muhd Zameer Zainun	(Malaysia) Johor Darul Ta'zim II F.C.	
Nov 2014	DC		(Malaysia) Fariss Azlan Mat Isa	(Malaysia) Kedah FA	
Nov 2014	DC		(Malaysia) Farouk Hashim	(Malaysia) Perlis FA	
Nov 2014	DC		(Cameroon) Martin Ekoule	(Myanmar) Zeyashwemye F.C.	
Nov 2014	MRL/MRL		(South Korea) Choi Hyun-yeon	(China) Harbin Yiteng F.C.	
Nov 2014	MC/DMC		(Malaysia) Nicholas Chan	(Malaysia) Free Agents	
Nov 2014	MR/AMR		(Malaysia) Shahrudin Yakup	(Malaysia) Johor Darul Ta'zim II F.C.	
Nov 2014	MC		(Malaysia) Mohd Fazilidin Khalid	(Malaysia) PDRM FA	
Nov 2014	ML/AML		(Malaysia) Pritam Singh a/l Charun Singh	(Malaysia) MISC-MIFA	
Nov 2014	ST		(Malaysia) Hattaphon Bun An	(Malaysia) T-Team F.C.	
Nov 2014	ST		(Malaysia) Mohd Saufi Ibrahim	(Malaysia) PDRM FA	
Nov 2014	ST		(Cameroon) Kallé Soné	(Malaysia) Free Agents	
Nov 2014	ST		(Nigeria) Ogunboye Iyanu Ezekiel	(Malaysia) DRB-Hicom F.C.	

=== Transfers out ===
Exit date	Position	No.	Player	To club	Fee
Nov 2014	MC		(Malaysia) Mohd Aliff Mazlan	(Malaysia) Malacca United F.C.	
Nov 2014	Physio		(Malaysia) Mohd Isamuddin Mohd Ali	(Malaysia) Penang FA	
Nov 2014	GK		(Malaysia) Mohd Hafiz Abu Bakar	(Malaysia) UiTM F.C.	
Nov 2014	GK		(Malaysia) Hafiz Arbaen	(Malaysia) Released	
Nov 2014	GK		(Malaysia) Ilyaf Abdullah Sani	(Malaysia) AirAsia F.C.	
Nov 2014	DR		(Malaysia) Chairi Emmir Solehaddin	(Malaysia) Sime Darby F.C. (loan Return)	
April 2014	DR		(Malaysia) Shah Riezal Ramli	Released	
Nov 2014	DL/ML		(Malaysia) Nabil Fikri Ilias	Released	
Nov 2014	DL		(Malaysia) Muhd Taufiq Mohd Shukor	(Malaysia) MOF F.C.	
April 2014	DC		(Malaysia) Hasnol Hamzah	Released	
Nov 2014	DL		(Malaysia) Johnson Chow Kai Choong	Released	
Nov 2014	DC		(Malaysia) Mohd Helmi Hariri Ibrahim	(Malaysia) Sime Darby F.C.	
Nov 2014	AMC		(Malaysia) Mohd Zulkifli Affendi Mohd Zakri	(Malaysia) Real Mulia F.C.	
Nov 2014	MLC		(Malaysia) S. Sumindran	(Malaysia) MISC-MIFA	
Nov 2014	ML/AML		(Malaysia) Noor Azizi Azman	(Malaysia) Putrajaya SPA F.C.	
Nov 2014	MC		(Malaysia) Muhd Syafiq Johari	Released	
Nov 2014	ML/AML		(Malaysia) S. Harivarman	(Malaysia) MISC-MIFA	
Nov 2014	MC		(Malaysia) B. Prabaharan	Released	
Nov 2014	MC		(Malaysia) S. Shanmuganathan	Released	
Nov 2014	MC		(Malaysia) Muhd Fariz Ismail	(Malaysia) Felcra F.C.	
Nov 2014	AMRL/ST		(Malaysia) Mohd Syafiq Zahari	Released	
Nov 2014	MC/AMC		(Malaysia) Muhd Azri Zulkiflee	(Malaysia) Sime Darby F.C.	
Nov 2014	MR/AMR		(Malaysia) Gusti Ishak Fitri Shah Said	(Malaysia) Sime Darby F.C.	
Nov 2014	ST		(Malaysia) Muhd Hadzirun Che Hamid	(Malaysia) Sime Darby F.C. (Loan Return)	
April 2014	ST		(Malaysia) Ridhwan Zainal	Released	
Nov 2014	ST		(Malaysia) M. Terrence	(Malaysia) Megah Murni F.C.	
Nov 2014	ST		(Malaysia) Azrol Hisham Talib	(Malaysia) MOF F.C.	

== T-Team FC ==
=== Transfers in ===
Entry date	Position	No.	Player	From club	Fee
Nov 2014	DC		(Nigeria) David Oniya	(Uzbekistan) Neftchi FK (Fergana)	
Nov 2014	AMRLC		(Uzbekistan) Sadriddin Abdullaev	(Uzbekistan) Lokomotiv Tashkent FK	
Nov 2014	MRC		(Malaysia) Mohd Asrol Ibrahim	(Malaysia) Sime Darby F.C.	
Nov 2014	MRL/AMRL		(Malaysia) Nor Hakim Hassan	(Malaysia) Terengganu FA (On Loan)	
Nov 2014	ML/AML		(Malaysia) Muhammad Azmi Hamzah	(Malaysia) Felda United F.C.	
Nov 2014	MC/AMC		(Malaysia) Mohd Rosdi Zakaria	(Malaysia) Putrajaya SPA F.C.	
Nov 2014	AMC/ST		(Malaysia) Syam Shahril Ghulam	(Malaysia) Free Agents	
Nov 2014	ST		(Uzbekistan) Farhod Tadjiyev	(Uzbekistan) Lokomotiv Tashkent FK	
Nov 2014	ST		(Malaysia) Mohd Faizuddin Manjur Ahmad	(Malaysia) Hanelang F.C.	

=== Transfers out ===
Exit date	Position	No.	Player	To club	Fee
Nov 2014	GK		(Malaysia) Suhardy Alby	Released	
Nov 2014	DC		(Malaysia) Shahril Faizal Sharifuddin	(Malaysia) Real Mulia F.C.	
Nov 2014	DC/DMC		(Australia) Goran Šubara	Released	
Nov 2014	DMC/MC		(Malaysia) Khairan Ezuan Razali	(Malaysia) Real Mulia F.C.	
Nov 2014	MC		(Malaysia) Muhd Hafizan Talib	(Malaysia) Malacca United F.C.	
Nov 2014	MR/AMR		(Malaysia) Shamsul Kamal Mohamad	Released	
Nov 2014	MC		(Malaysia) Muhamad Sharin Sapien	(Malaysia) Terengganu FA	
Nov 2014	MRL/AMRL		(Malaysia) Mohd Fazli Baharudin	(Malaysia) PKNS F.C.	
Nov 2014	MRLC/AMRLC		(Brazil) Leandro Dos Santos	(Malaysia) Selangor FA	
Nov 2014	DL		(Malaysia) Muhammad Naqib Najwan Saufi	(Malaysia) Felda United F.C.	
Nov 2014	ST		(Malaysia) Azlan Ismail	Released	
Nov 2014	ST		(Indonesia) Patrich Wanggai	(Indonesia) Sriwijaya F.C.	
Nov 2014	ST		(Rwanda) Jimmy Mulisa	Released	
Nov 2014	ST		(Malaysia) Hattaphon Bun An	(Malaysia) Kuala Lumpur FA	
Nov 2014	AMC/ST		(Malaysia) Mohd Nizad Ayub	(Malaysia) Sime Darby F.C.	
Nov 2014	ST		(Malaysia) Mohd Muinuddin Mokhtar	(Malaysia) Malacca United F.C.	

== Penang FA ==
=== Transfers in ===
Entry date	Position	No.	Player	From club	Fee
Nov 2014	Head Coach		(Brazil) Jacksen F. Tiago	Persipura Jayapura	
Nov 2014	Physio		(Malaysia) Mohd Isamuddin Mohd Ali	(Malaysia) Kuala Lumpur FA	
Nov 2014	GK		(Malaysia) Sani Anuar Kamsani	(Malaysia) Sarawak FA	
Nov 2014	GK		(Malaysia) Amirul Asyraf Mohd Suhaidi	(Malaysia) UiTM F.C.	
Nov 2014	GK		(Malaysia) Mohd Remezey Che Ros	(Malaysia) PKNS F.C.	
Nov 2014	DR/AMR		(Malaysia) Mohd Azrul Ahmad	(Malaysia) ATM FA	
Nov 2014	DC		(Malaysia) Mafry Balang	(Malaysia) Sarawak FA	
Nov 2014	DL		(Malaysia) Mohd Farid Ramli	(Malaysia) Sime Darby F.C.	
Nov 2014	DRL		(Malaysia) Mazlizam Mohamad	(Malaysia) Terengganu FA	
Nov 2014	DC		(Brazil) Reinaldo Lobo	(Indonesia) Mitra Kukar FC	
Nov 2014	MC/DMC		(Malaysia) Mohd Redzuan Nawi	(Malaysia) Sabah FA	
Nov 2014	MC/DMC		(Malaysia) Mohd Syukur Saidin	(Malaysia) Sime Darby F.C.	
Nov 2014	MC		(Malaysia) See Kok Luen	(Malaysia) Johor Darul Ta'zim II F.C.	
Nov 2014	MLC/AMLC		(Malaysia) Mohd Faiz Subri	(Malaysia) Terengganu FA	
Nov 2014	MLR/AMLR		(Malaysia) Mohd Azinee Taib	(Malaysia) Johor Darul Ta'zim II F.C.	
Nov 2014	MC		(Malaysia) Som Keat a/l Preseart	(Malaysia) Felda United F.C.	
Nov 2014	AMC/ST		(Brazil) Hilton Moreira	Free Agents	
Nov 2014	ST		(Malaysia) Failee Ghazli	(Malaysia) Sime Darby F.C.	
Nov 2014	ST		(Brazil) Beto Gonçalves	(Indonesia) Arema Cronus F.C.	

=== Transfers out ===
Exit date	Position	No.	Player	To club	Fee
Nov 2014	GK		(Malaysia) G. Jeevananthan	(Malaysia) PKNS F.C.	
Nov 2014	GK		(Malaysia) Amir Omar Khata	(Malaysia) Megah Murni F.C.	
Nov 2014	DC		(Malaysia) Ismail Suboh	Released	
Nov 2014	DC		(Malaysia) Suhaidi Akmal Mohd Noor	Released	
Nov 2014	DL/ML		(Malaysia) Syafiq Azri Ahmad Kamal	(Malaysia) Malacca United F.C.	
Nov 2014	DL		(Malaysia) Hariri Mohd Safii	Released	
Nov 2014	DR		(Malaysia) Mohd Fakhrul Radzi Yaakob	(Malaysia) PBAPP FC	
Nov 2014	DL		(Malaysia) Kamarul Hesam Kadri	(Malaysia) Felcra F.C.	
Nov 2014	DC		(Malaysia) Shaik Awish Alkirani	(Malaysia) Real Mulia F.C.	
Nov 2014	DRC		(Malaysia) A. Varathan	(Malaysia) Sarawak FA	
Nov 2014	DC		(Malaysia) Lew Han Hung	(Malaysia) Kedah FA	
Nov 2014	DC		(South Korea) Lee Kwang-hyun	(Malaysia) Kuantan FA	
Nov 2014	DMC		(Malaysia) Khairan Eroza Razali	(Malaysia) Retired	
Nov 2014	MR/AMR		(Malaysia) Shazuan Ashraf Mathews	(Malaysia) Kedah FA	
Nov 2014	DMC/DC		(Malaysia) G. Mahathevan	(Malaysia) Sarawak FA	
Nov 2014	MC/DMC		(Malaysia) Mohd Azizan Baba	(Malaysia) Malacca United F.C.	
Nov 2014	ML/AML		(Malaysia) Muhd Ruzaini Jamaluddin	(Malaysia) Sungai Ara F.C.	
Nov 2014	ST		(Malaysia) Mohd Norizam Salaman	(Malaysia) AirAsia F.C.	
Nov 2014	ST		(Malaysia) Muhamad Zamri Chin	Released	
Nov 2014	ST		(Malaysia) Mohd Baser Napae	(Malaysia) PBAPP FC	
Nov 2014	ST		(Brazil) Luiz Ricardo Lino Dos Santos	(Brazil) Guarani F.C.	
Nov 2014	ST		(Angola) Titi Buengo	Retired	

== PKNS FC ==
=== Transfers in ===
Entry date	Position	No.	Player	From club	Fee
Nov 2014	GK		(Malaysia) G. Jeevananthan	(Malaysia) Penang FA	
Nov 2014	GK		(Malaysia) Mohd Nor Haziq Aris	(Malaysia) Perak FA	
Nov 2014	GK		(Malaysia) Norhadi Ubaidillah	(Malaysia) UiTM F.C.	
Nov 2014	DLC		(Malaysia) Ahmad Khuzaimie Piee	(Malaysia) Malacca United F.C.	
Nov 2014	DL/ML		(Japan) Keisuke Ogawa	(Thailand) Chiangrai United F.C.	
Nov 2014	DC		(Argentina) Gonzalo Soto	(Peru) Club Universitario de Deportes	
Nov 2014	DR/MR		(Malaysia) Mohd Nizam Abu Bakar	(Malaysia) Negeri Sembilan FA	
Nov 2014	MC/DMC		(Malaysia) M. Sivakumar	(Malaysia) Negeri Sembilan FA	
Nov 2014	MLC/AMLC		(Malaysia) Munir Amran	(Malaysia) PDRM FA	
Nov 2014	MLC/AMLC		(Malaysia) Adam Shafiq Fua'ad	(Malaysia) Harimau Muda C	
Nov 2014	MR/AMR		(Malaysia) Mohd Alif Haikal Mohd Sabri	(Malaysia) Harimau Muda C	
Nov 2014	MRL/AMRL		(Malaysia) Mohd Fazli Baharuddin	(Malaysia) T-Team F.C.	
Nov 2014	MRLC/AMRLC		(Malaysia) Liew Kit Kong	(Malaysia) Free Agents	
Nov 2014	ST		(Malaysia) Farderin Kadir	(Malaysia) Sime Darby F.C.	
Nov 2014	AMR/ST		(Malaysia) Mohd Yusri Abas	(Malaysia) Malacca United F.C.	
Nov 2014	ST		(Argentina) Gabriel Guerra	(Argentina) Boca Juniors (On Loan)	
Nov 2014	ST		(Malaysia) Muhd Nor Ubaidullah Abdul Rahman	(Malaysia) Selangor FA	

=== Transfers out ===
Exit date	Position	No.	Player	To club	Fee
Nov 2014	GK		(Malaysia) Mohd Zamir Selamat	(Malaysia) Perak FA	
Nov 2014	GK		(Malaysia) Mohd Remezey Che Ros	(Malaysia) Penang FA	
Nov 2014	DR		(Malaysia) Ally Imran Samarkhan	(Malaysia) Putrajaya SPA F.C.	
Nov 2014	DLC		(Malaysia) Es Lizuan Zahid Amir	Released	
Nov 2014	DRC/DMC		(Malaysia) Mohd Helmi Remeli	(Malaysia) Terengganu FA	
Nov 2014	DC		(Indonesia) Hamka Hamzah	(Indonesia) Pusamania Borneo F.C.	
Nov 2014	MRC		(Malaysia) Shafuan Adli Shaari	(Malaysia) Sabah FA	
Nov 2014	MC		(Malaysia) Radzi Mohd Hussin	University Malaysia Sabah F.C.	
Nov 2014	MC/AMC		(Malaysia) Muhd Hafiz Abu Hassan	(Malaysia) Putrajaya SPA F.C.	
Nov 2014	MRC/AMRC		(Malaysia) Mohd Fauzan Dzulkifli	(Malaysia) Felda United F.C.	
Nov 2014	MC		(Malaysia) Ibrahim Aziz	(Malaysia) UiTM F.C.	
Nov 2014	MRLC/AMRLC		(Malaysia) Shahurain Abu Samah	(Malaysia) PDRM FA	
Nov 2014	ST		(Malaysia) Mohd Fakrul Aiman Sidid	(Malaysia) DRB-Hicom F.C.	
Nov 2014	ST/AMC		(South Korea) Kim Dong-Chan	Released	
Nov 2014	ST/AMC		(Croatia) Karlo Primorac	Released	

== DRB-Hicom FC ==
=== Transfers in ===
Entry date	Position	No.	Player	From club	Fee
Nov 2014	GK		(Malaysia) Azwan Azrul Anuar	(Malaysia) Negeri Sembilan FA	
Nov 2014	DC		(Malaysia) Abdul Farish Shah Abdul Latib	(Malaysia) Perak FA	
Nov 2014	DC		(Malaysia) B. Sanjef Dinesh	(Malaysia) Harimau Muda C	Free
Nov 2014	DR		(Malaysia) Muhd Aizat Jaini	(Malaysia) UiTM F.C.	Free
Nov 2014	DL/ML		(Malaysia) Mohd Farid Saibun	(Malaysia) Malacca United F.C.	Free
Nov 2014	MRC		(Japan) Terukazu Tanaka	(Thailand) Sisaket F.C.	Free
Nov 2014	ST		(Croatia) Ivan Babić	(Malaysia) Negeri Sembilan FA	Free
Nov 2014	ST		(Malaysia) Ahmad Aminuddin Shaharudin	(Malaysia) Malacca United F.C.	Free
Nov 2014	ST		(Malaysia) Mohd Ismail Mamat	(Malaysia) Proton F.C.	Free
Nov 2014	ST		(Malaysia) Mohd Fakrul Aiman Sidid	(Malaysia) PKNS F.C.	Free

=== Transfers out ===
Exit date	Position	No.	Player	To club	Fee
Nov 2014	DC/DMC	41	(South Korea) Kwon Jun	(Malaysia) Putrajaya SPA F.C.	
Nov 2014	GK		(Malaysia) Mohd Solehin Mohd Rodzi	(Malaysia) PBAPP FC	
April 2014	GK		(Malaysia) Mohd Sheril Anuar Saini	(Malaysia) Kedah Malays FA	
Nov 2014	DRC		(Malaysia) Ahmad Faizal Sumar	(Malaysia) MOF F.C.	
Nov 2014	DC		(Malaysia) Mohd Arif Baseri	(Malaysia) Perlis FA	
Nov 2014	DC		(Malaysia) Mohd Sayuti Mohd Shukri	(Malaysia)	
Nov 2014	DR		(Malaysia) Muhd Azreen Zulkafali	(Malaysia) ATM FA	
June 2014	MC		(Nigeria) Atapa Kazeem Adeolu	(Maldives) B.G. Sports Club	
Nov 2014	ML/AML		(Malaysia) Khairul Anwar Shahrudin	(Malaysia) Sime Darby F.C.	
April 2014	MC/AMC		(Japan) Shataro Hattori	Released	
Nov 2014	MRL/AMRL		(Malaysia) Mohd Hafizi Amiruddin	(Malaysia) MOF F.C.	
Nov 2014	MC/DMC		(Malaysia) Mohd Razif Abdul Rahim	(Malaysia) PBAPP FC	
Nov 2014	MC/DMC		(Australia) Mohammad Naeem Rahimi	(Singapore) Tampines Rovers FC	
Nov 2014	ST		(Nigeria) Ogunboye Iyanu Ezekiel	(Malaysia) Kuala Lumpur FA	
Nov 2014	ST		(Australia) Emile Damey	Released	

== Putrajaya SPA FC ==
=== Transfers in ===
Entry date	Position	No.	Player	From club	Fee
December 2014	D/DMC	5	(South Korea) Kwon Jun	(Malaysia) DRB-Hicom F.C.	
December 2014	DR		(Malaysia) Rafiezan Razali	(Malaysia) Samarahan F.C.	
December 2014	DL		(Malaysia) Hishamuddin Othman	(Malaysia)	
December 2014	DC		(Malaysia) Syed Muhammad Wan Hassan	(Malaysia)	
December 2014	GK		(Malaysia) Mohd Faiz Ismail	(Malaysia)	
December 2014	AMC		(Malaysia) Muhd Hafiz Abu Hassan	(Malaysia) PKNS F.C.	
December 2014	DR		(Malaysia) Ally Imran Samarkhan	(Malaysia) PKNS F.C.	
December 2014	DL		(Malaysia) Muzammer Mohd Zaki	(Malaysia)	
December 2014	Defender		(Malaysia)	(Malaysia)	
December 2014	Defender		(Malaysia)	(Malaysia)	
December 2014	AML		(Malaysia) Mohd Ibrahim Jobeli	(Malaysia) Sarawak FA	
December 2014	Defender		(Malaysia)	(Malaysia)	
December 2014	Defender		(Malaysia)	(Malaysia)	
December 2014	ST		(Nigeria) Mikel Ijezie	(Malaysia) Felcra F.C.	

=== Transfers out ===
Exit date	Position	No.	Player	To club	Fee
December 2014	GK		(Malaysia) Izzat Abdul Rahim	(Malaysia) Malacca United F.C.	
December 2014	DC		(Guadeloupe) Eddy Viator	(Singapore) Tampines Rovers FC	
December 2014	DCRL/DMC		(Malaysia) Mohd Hafiszuan Salehuddin	(Malaysia) Sime Darby F.C.	
December 2014	DL/ML		(Malaysia) Fiqri Azwan Ghazali	(Malaysia) Malacca United F.C.	
December 2014	DR		(Malaysia) A. Puvanarajah	(Malaysia) Real Mulia F.C.	
December 2014	MC/AMC		(Malaysia) Mohd Rosdi Zakaria	(Malaysia) T-Team F.C.	
December 2014	MLR/AMLR		(Malaysia) Muhd Asyidi Dil Ashar Yusof	(Malaysia) PDRM FA	
December 2014	MC/DMC		(Malaysia) Muhd Fikri Elhan	(Malaysia) Kuantan FA	
December 2014	MC		(South Korea) Shin Hyun-joon	Released	
December 2014	ML/DL		(Malaysia) Nurfahmie Hadzrin Nordin	(Malaysia) Kuantan FA	
December 2014	MC/AMC		(Malaysia) Mohd Hanifuddin Abdul Rahman	(Malaysia) Kuantan FA	
December 2014	DL		(Malaysia) Muzammer Mohd Zaki	Released	
December 2014	DR		(Malaysia) Sazali Suwandi	(Malaysia) Real Mulia F.C.	
April 2014	ST		(Guadeloupe) Michaël Niçoise	Released	
December 2014	ST		(Croatia) Alen Guć	Released	

== Sabah FA ==
=== Transfers in ===
Entry date	Position	No.	Player	From club	Fee
Nov 2014	DL		(Malaysia) Mohd Khairi Kiman	(Malaysia) Perak FA	
Nov 2014	DC		(Senegal) Abdoulaye Faye	(England) Hull City A.F.C.	
Nov 2014	DC		(Malaysia) Abdul Thaufiq Abdul Haq	(Malaysia) Cebagoo F.C.	
Nov 2014	DLC		(Malaysia) Hardy Charles Parsi	(Malaysia) Johor Darul Ta'zim II F.C.	
Nov 2014	DMC/DR		(Malaysia) Zuraindey Jumai	(Malaysia) Kedah FA	
Nov 2014	MC		(Malaysia) M. Yoganathan	(Malaysia) Perak FA	
Nov 2014	ML/AML		(Malaysia) Muhd Izuan Salahuddin	(Malaysia) Sime Darby F.C.	
Nov 2014	AMRC/ST		(Malaysia) R. Surendran	(Malaysia) Perak FA	
Nov 2014	ST		(Libya) Éamon Zayed	(Republic of Ireland) Shamrock Rovers F.C.	
Nov 2014	AMRL/ST		(Senegal) El Hadji Diouf	(England) Leeds United A.F.C.	
Nov 2014	ST		(Malaysia) Muhammad Shafiq Jamal	(Malaysia) Sime Darby F.C.	
Apr 2015	ST		(Australia) Joel Chianese	(New Zealand) Auckland City FC	

=== Transfers out ===
Exit date	Position	No.	Player	To club	Fee
Nov 2014	DRC		(Malaysia) Dendy Lowa	Released	
Nov 2014	DC		(Malaysia) Mohd Reithaudin Awang Emran	(Malaysia) Retired	
Nov 2014	DC		(Croatia) Predrag Pocuca	(Singapore) Tampines Rovers FC	
Nov 2014	DR/MR		(Malaysia) Mohd Shahrul Chankui	Released	
Nov 2014	DMC/MC		(Malaysia) Mohd Redzuan Nawi	(Malaysia) Penang FA	
Nov 2014	ML/AML		(Malaysia) Isma Alif Mohd Salim	(Malaysia) PDRM FA	
Nov 2014	MC		(Malaysia) Sabri Sahar	(Malaysia) Sarawak FA	
Nov 2014	MC/AMC		(Brazil) Andrezinho	Released	
Nov 2014	MR/AMR		(Malaysia) Rexjeson Pitirus	(Malaysia) Malacca United F.C.	
Nov 2014	ST		(Malaysia) Mohd Farid Ideris	(Malaysia) Young Fighters F.C.	
Nov 2014	AMRC/ST		(Malaysia) Zainizam Marjan	Released	
Nov 2014	ST		(Syria) Marwan Sayedeh	Released	
Nov 2014	ST		(Liberia) Jerome Suku Doe	Released	
Jan 2015	AMR/ST		(Singapore) Fazrul Nawaz	Released	

== UiTM FC ==
=== Transfers in ===
Entry date	Position	No.	Player	From club	Fee
Nov 2014	GK		(Malaysia) Mohd Hafiz Abu Bakar	(Malaysia) Kuala Lumpur FA	
Nov 2014	GK		(Malaysia) Muhd Azam Jais	(Malaysia) Harimau Muda C	
Nov 2014	DR		(Malaysia) Muhd Farid Azmi	(Malaysia) Felda United F.C.	
Nov 2014	DC		(South Korea) Park Chul-hyung	(Indonesia) Mitra Kukar F.C.	
Nov 2014	DR/MR		(Malaysia) Syed Ariff Syed Uzir	(Malaysia) Sime Darby F.C. (On Loan)	
Nov 2014	DC		(Malaysia) Mohd Adib Zainuddin	(Malaysia) Harimau Muda C	
Nov 2014	DC		(Malaysia) Ahmad Haziq Ahmad Fuad	(Malaysia) Sime Darby F.C.	
Nov 2014	MR/AMR		(Malaysia) Muhd Hasnan Mat Isa	(Malaysia) UPM F.C.	
Nov 2014	ML/AML		(Malaysia) Mohamed Faridzuan Yusuf	(Malaysia) Perak FA	
Nov 2014	MC/AMC		(Malaysia) Raslam Khan Abdul Rashid	(Malaysia) Megah Murni F.C.	
Nov 2014	MC		(Malaysia) Ibrahim Aziz	(Malaysia) PKNS F.C.	
Nov 2014	MR/AMR		(Malaysia) Mohd Hidayat Amaruddin	(Malaysia) Perak FA	
Nov 2014	ST		(Ivory Coast) Dao Bakary	(Malaysia) Perlis FA	
Nov 2014	ST		(Malaysia) Muhd Hasrul Nurkholis Hasim	(Malaysia) Malacca United F.C.	
Nov 2014	ST		(Malaysia) Muhd Nursalam Zainal Abidin	(Malaysia) Johor Darul Ta'zim II F.C.	

=== Transfers out ===
Exit date	Position	No.	Player	To club	Fee
Nov 2014	GK		(Malaysia) Afiff Aizad Azman	(Malaysia) Johor Darul Ta'zim II F.C.	
Nov 2014	GK		(Malaysia) Norhadi Ubaidillah	(Malaysia) PKNS F.C.	
Nov 2014	GK		(Malaysia) Amirul Asyraf Suhaidi	(Malaysia) Penang FA	
Nov 2014	DR		(Malaysia) Mohd Faid Mohd Tahir	Released	
Nov 2014	DR		(Malaysia) Mohd Nizat Salleh	(Malaysia) Kedah Malays FA	
Nov 2014	DC/ST		(Malaysia) Mohd Firdaus Paris	(Malaysia) Kuantan FA	
Nov 2014	DR		(Malaysia) Muhd Aizat Jaini	(Malaysia) Kuantan FA	
Nov 2014	DL		(Malaysia) Adam Othman Mohd Arfah	(Malaysia) Young Fighters F.C.	
Nov 2014	DC		(Malaysia) Mohd Zulfadlie A'ashri	Released	
Nov 2014	DC		(South Korea) Bang Seung-hwan	(Malaysia) Kedah FA	
Nov 2014	DL/ML		(Malaysia) Muhd Afif Asyraf Mohd Zabawi	(Malaysia) Kuantan FA	
Nov 2014	MR/AMR		(Malaysia) Muhd Aminuddin Azmi	Released	
Nov 2014	MR/AMR		(Malaysia) Muhd Afiq Amsyar Salamat	(Malaysia) ATM FA	
Nov 2014	DR/MR		(Malaysia) Meor Nasrullah Meor Ali	(Malaysia) Real Mulia F.C.	
Nov 2014	ST		(Malaysia) Mohd Razren Jesni	(Malaysia) Kuantan FA	
Nov 2014	ST		(Malaysia) Muhd Farizzuan Azhar	(Malaysia) Real Mulia F.C.	
Nov 2014	ST		(Malaysia) Muhd Afham Zulkipeli	(Malaysia) MOF F.C.	
Nov 2014	ST		(Nigeria) Obi Ikechukwu Charles	Released	
Nov 2014	ST		(Angola) Eldon Maquemba	Released	

== Harimau Muda ==
=== Transfers in ===
Entry date	Position	No.	Player	From club	Fee

=== Transfers out ===
Exit date	Position	No.	Player	To club	Fee

== Malaysia FAM League ==
The 2015 Malaysia FAM League (referred to as the FAM League) is the 63rd season of the FAM League since its establishment in 1952. The league is currently the third level football league in Malaysia.

== Air Asia F.C. ==
=== Transfers in ===
Entry date	Position	No.	Player	From club	Fee
Dec 2014	Director Of football		(Malaysia) G. Torairaju	(Malaysia) DRB-Hicom F.C.	
Dec 2014	Head coach		(Malaysia) Mohd Nidzam Jamil	(Malaysia) Putrajaya SPA F.C.	
	MC		(Malaysia) Norismaidham Ismail	(Malaysia) Perlis FA	
	DC		(Malaysia) K. Shathiya	(Malaysia) Malacca United F.C.	
	ST		(Malaysia) Khairul Azahar Eidros	(Malaysia) Johor Darul Ta'zim II F.C.	
	AML		(Malaysia) Khushairi Aizad Jamalludin	(Malaysia) Selangor FA	
	AMC/ST		(Malaysia) Amir Shahreen Mubin	(Malaysia) Malacca United F.C.	
	DL		(Malaysia) Mohd Putra Alif Othman	(Malaysia)	
	GK		(Malaysia)	(Malaysia)	
	AC		(Malaysia) Mohd Hafidz Helmi Abdullah	(Malaysia)	
	GK Coach		(Malaysia) Raja Azlan Shah	(Malaysia)	
	DC		(Malaysia) Mohd Hilmi Rosli	(Malaysia)	
	DF		(Malaysia)	(Malaysia)	
	DL		(Malaysia)	(Malaysia)	
	DR		(Malaysia)	(Malaysia)	
	DF		(Malaysia)	(Malaysia)	
	ST		(Malaysia) Mohd Norizam Salaman	(Malaysia) Penang FA	
	DF		(Malaysia)	(Malaysia)	

== Felcra F.C. ==
=== Transfers in ===
Entry date	Position	No.	Player	From club	Fee
	GK		(Malaysia) Mohd Amirul Asraf Mohd Noor	(Malaysia) PDRM FA	
	DC		(Malaysia) Al-Amin Abdullah	(Malaysia)	
	DR		(Malaysia) Muhd Elfie Elyaz Harizam	(Malaysia) Perlis FA	
	DC		(Malaysia) Nor Ikhwan Alias	(Malaysia) Putrajaya SPA F.C.	
	MC		(Malaysia) Nor Irwan Mohd Shukri	(Malaysia)	
	DL		(Malaysia) Kamarul Hesam Mohd Kadri	(Malaysia) Penang FA	
	MC		(Malaysia) Mohd Hazeman Abdul Karim	(Malaysia)	
	AML/ST		(Malaysia) Mohd Hazwan Zainun	(Malaysia) Perlis FA	
	MC		(Malaysia) Muhd Izaire Mohd Radzi	(Malaysia)	
	ST		(Malaysia) Rahmat Hassan	(Malaysia) Terengganu FA	
	ST		(Malaysia) Mohd Faidzol Fazreen Shamsudin	(Malaysia) Terengganu FA	
	MRC		(Malaysia) Mohd Shafiq Azman	(Malaysia) Terengganu FA	
	DL/ML		(Malaysia) Mohd Hafizzal Mohd Yusoff	(Malaysia)	
	ST		(Malaysia) Azrul Abdul Rahim	(Malaysia)	
	DF		(Malaysia)	(Malaysia)	
	AMRL/ST		(Malaysia)	(Malaysia)	
	DF		(Malaysia)	(Malaysia)	

== Hanelang F.C. ==
=== Transfers in ===
Entry date	Position	No.	Player	From club	Fee
	GK		(Malaysia)	(Malaysia)	
	GK		(Malaysia)	(Malaysia)	
	DF		(Malaysia)	(Malaysia)	
	DF		(Malaysia)	(Malaysia)	
	MF		(Malaysia)	(Malaysia)	
	DC		(Malaysia)	(Malaysia)	
	MF		(Malaysia)	(Malaysia)	
	AMC/ST		(Malaysia)	(Malaysia)	
	DF		(Malaysia)	(Malaysia)	
	ST		(Malaysia)	(Malaysia)	
	ST		(Malaysia)	(Malaysia)	
	DF		(Malaysia)	(Malaysia)	
	DL		(Malaysia)	(Malaysia)	
	DR		(Malaysia)	(Malaysia)	
	DF		(Malaysia)	(Malaysia)	
	AMRL/ST		(Malaysia)	(Malaysia)	
	DF		(Malaysia)	(Malaysia)	

=== Transfers out ===
Exit date	Position	No.	Player	To club	Fee
	ST		(Malaysia)	(Malaysia)	
	DF		(Malaysia)	(Malaysia)	
	MF		(Malaysia)	(Malaysia)	
	MF		(Malaysia)	(Malaysia)	
	MF		(Malaysia)	(Malaysia)	
	ST		(Malaysia)	(Malaysia)	
	MF		(Malaysia)	(Malaysia)	
	MF		(Malaysia)	(Malaysia)	
	MF		(Malaysia)	(Malaysia)	
	D/ML		(Malaysia)	(Malaysia)	
	AMC		(Malaysia)	(Malaysia)	
	MC		(Malaysia)	(Malaysia)	
	DC		(Malaysia)	(Malaysia)	
	GK		(Malaysia)	(Malaysia)	
	DF		(Malaysia)	(Malaysia)	
	DF		(Malaysia)	(Malaysia)	
	ST		(Malaysia)	(Malaysia)	

== Harimau Muda C ==
=== Transfers in ===
Entry date	Position	No.	Player	From club	Fee
	GK		(Malaysia)	(Malaysia)	
	GK		(Malaysia)	(Malaysia)	
	DF		(Malaysia)	(Malaysia)	
	DF		(Malaysia)	(Malaysia)	
	MF		(Malaysia)	(Malaysia)	
	DC		(Malaysia)	(Malaysia)	
	MF		(Malaysia)	(Malaysia)	
	AMC/ST		(Malaysia)	(Malaysia)	
	DF		(Malaysia)	(Malaysia)	
	ST		(Malaysia)	(Malaysia)	
	ST		(Malaysia)	(Malaysia)	
	DF		(Malaysia)	(Malaysia)	
	DL		(Malaysia)	(Malaysia)	
	DR		(Malaysia)	(Malaysia)	
	DF		(Malaysia)	(Malaysia)	
	AMRL/ST		(Malaysia)	(Malaysia)	
	DF		(Malaysia)	(Malaysia)	

=== Transfers out ===
Exit date	Position	No.	Player	To club	Fee
	ST		(Malaysia)	(Malaysia)	
	DF		(Malaysia)	(Malaysia)	
	MF		(Malaysia)	(Malaysia)	
	MF		(Malaysia)	(Malaysia)	
	MF		(Malaysia)	(Malaysia)	
	ST		(Malaysia)	(Malaysia)	
	MF		(Malaysia)	(Malaysia)	
	MF		(Malaysia)	(Malaysia)	
	MF		(Malaysia)	(Malaysia)	
	D/ML		(Malaysia)	(Malaysia)	
	AMC		(Malaysia)	(Malaysia)	
	MC		(Malaysia)	(Malaysia)	
	DC		(Malaysia)	(Malaysia)	
	GK		(Malaysia)	(Malaysia)	
	DF		(Malaysia)	(Malaysia)	
	DF		(Malaysia)	(Malaysia)	
	ST		(Malaysia)	(Malaysia)	

== Johor Darul Ta'zim III F.C. ==
=== Transfers in ===
Entry date	Position	No.	Player	From club	Fee
	GK		(Malaysia)	(Malaysia)	
	GK		(Malaysia)	(Malaysia)	
	DF		(Malaysia)	(Malaysia)	
	DF		(Malaysia)	(Malaysia)	
	MF		(Malaysia)	(Malaysia)	
	DC		(Malaysia)	(Malaysia)	
	MF		(Malaysia)	(Malaysia)	
	AMC/ST		(Malaysia)	(Malaysia)	
	DF		(Malaysia)	(Malaysia)	
	ST		(Malaysia)	(Malaysia)	
	ST		(Malaysia)	(Malaysia)	
	DF		(Malaysia)	(Malaysia)	
	DL		(Malaysia)	(Malaysia)	
	DR		(Malaysia)	(Malaysia)	
	DF		(Malaysia)	(Malaysia)	
	AMRL/ST		(Malaysia)	(Malaysia)	
	DF		(Malaysia)	(Malaysia)	

== Kedah Malays FA ==
=== Transfers in ===
Entry date	Position	No.	Player	From club	Fee
	GK		(Malaysia)	(Malaysia)	
	GK		(Malaysia)	(Malaysia)	
	DF		(Malaysia)	(Malaysia)	
	DF		(Malaysia)	(Malaysia)	
	MF		(Malaysia)	(Malaysia)	
	DC		(Malaysia)	(Malaysia)	
	MF		(Malaysia)	(Malaysia)	
	AMC/ST		(Malaysia)	(Malaysia)	
	DF		(Malaysia)	(Malaysia)	
	ST		(Malaysia)	(Malaysia)	
	ST		(Malaysia)	(Malaysia)	
	DF		(Malaysia)	(Malaysia)	
	DL		(Malaysia)	(Malaysia)	
	DR		(Malaysia)	(Malaysia)	
	DF		(Malaysia)	(Malaysia)	
	AMRL/ST		(Malaysia)	(Malaysia)	
	DF		(Malaysia)	(Malaysia)	

=== Transfers out ===
Exit date	Position	No.	Player	To club	Fee
	ST		(Malaysia)	(Malaysia)	
	DF		(Malaysia)	(Malaysia)	
	MF		(Malaysia)	(Malaysia)	
	MF		(Malaysia)	(Malaysia)	
	MF		(Malaysia)	(Malaysia)	
	ST		(Malaysia)	(Malaysia)	
	MF		(Malaysia)	(Malaysia)	
	MF		(Malaysia)	(Malaysia)	
	MF		(Malaysia)	(Malaysia)	
	D/ML		(Malaysia)	(Malaysia)	
	AMC		(Malaysia)	(Malaysia)	
	MC		(Malaysia)	(Malaysia)	
	DC		(Malaysia)	(Malaysia)	
	GK		(Malaysia)	(Malaysia)	
	DF		(Malaysia)	(Malaysia)	
	DF		(Malaysia)	(Malaysia)	
	ST		(Malaysia)	(Malaysia)	

== Malacca United F.C. ==
=== Transfers in ===
Entry date	Position	No.	Player	From club	Fee
	GK		(Malaysia)	(Malaysia)	
	GK		(Malaysia)	(Malaysia)	
	DF		(Malaysia)	(Malaysia)	
	DF		(Malaysia)	(Malaysia)	
	MF		(Malaysia)	(Malaysia)	
	DC		(Malaysia)	(Malaysia)	
	MF		(Malaysia)	(Malaysia)	
	AMC/ST		(Malaysia)	(Malaysia)	
	DF		(Malaysia)	(Malaysia)	
	ST		(Malaysia)	(Malaysia)	
	ST		(Malaysia)	(Malaysia)	
	DF		(Malaysia)	(Malaysia)	
	DL		(Malaysia)	(Malaysia)	
	DR		(Malaysia)	(Malaysia)	
	DF		(Malaysia)	(Malaysia)	
	AMRL/ST		(Malaysia)	(Malaysia)	
	DF		(Malaysia)	(Malaysia)	

=== Transfers out ===
Exit date	Position	No.	Player	To club	Fee
	ST		(Malaysia)	(Malaysia)	
	DF		(Malaysia)	(Malaysia)	
	MF		(Malaysia)	(Malaysia)	
	MF		(Malaysia)	(Malaysia)	
	MF		(Malaysia)	(Malaysia)	
	ST		(Malaysia)	(Malaysia)	
	MF		(Malaysia)	(Malaysia)	
	MF		(Malaysia)	(Malaysia)	
	MF		(Malaysia)	(Malaysia)	
	D/ML		(Malaysia)	(Malaysia)	
	AMC		(Malaysia)	(Malaysia)	
	MC		(Malaysia)	(Malaysia)	
	DC		(Malaysia)	(Malaysia)	
	GK		(Malaysia)	(Malaysia)	
	DF		(Malaysia)	(Malaysia)	
	DF		(Malaysia)	(Malaysia)	
	ST		(Malaysia)	(Malaysia)	

== Megah Murni F.C. ==
=== Transfers in ===
Entry date	Position	No.	Player	From club	Fee
	GK		(Malaysia)	(Malaysia)	
	GK		(Malaysia)	(Malaysia)	
	DF		(Malaysia)	(Malaysia)	
	DF		(Malaysia)	(Malaysia)	
	MF		(Malaysia)	(Malaysia)	
	DC		(Malaysia)	(Malaysia)	
	MF		(Malaysia)	(Malaysia)	
	AMC/ST		(Malaysia)	(Malaysia)	
	DF		(Malaysia)	(Malaysia)	
	ST		(Malaysia)	(Malaysia)	
	ST		(Malaysia)	(Malaysia)	
	DF		(Malaysia)	(Malaysia)	
	DL		(Malaysia)	(Malaysia)	
	DR		(Malaysia)	(Malaysia)	
	DF		(Malaysia)	(Malaysia)	
	AMRL/ST		(Malaysia)	(Malaysia)	
	DF		(Malaysia)	(Malaysia)	

== MISC-MIFA ==
=== Transfers in ===
Entry date	Position	No.	Player	From club	Fee
	GK		(Malaysia)	(Malaysia)	
	GK		(Malaysia)	(Malaysia)	
	DF		(Malaysia)	(Malaysia)	
	DF		(Malaysia)	(Malaysia)	
	MF		(Malaysia)	(Malaysia)	
	DC		(Malaysia)	(Malaysia)	
	MF		(Malaysia)	(Malaysia)	
	AMC/ST		(Malaysia)	(Malaysia)	
	DF		(Malaysia)	(Malaysia)	
	ST		(Malaysia)	(Malaysia)	
	ST		(Malaysia)	(Malaysia)	
	DF		(Malaysia)	(Malaysia)	
	DL		(Malaysia)	(Malaysia)	
	DR		(Malaysia)	(Malaysia)	
	DF		(Malaysia)	(Malaysia)	
	AMRL/ST		(Malaysia)	(Malaysia)	
	DF		(Malaysia)	(Malaysia)	

=== Transfers out ===
Exit date	Position	No.	Player	To club	Fee
	ST		(Malaysia)	(Malaysia)	
	DF		(Malaysia)	(Malaysia)	
	MF		(Malaysia)	(Malaysia)	
	MF		(Malaysia)	(Malaysia)	
	MF		(Malaysia)	(Malaysia)	
	ST		(Malaysia)	(Malaysia)	
	MF		(Malaysia)	(Malaysia)	
	MF		(Malaysia)	(Malaysia)	
	MF		(Malaysia)	(Malaysia)	
	D/ML		(Malaysia)	(Malaysia)	
	AMC		(Malaysia)	(Malaysia)	
	MC		(Malaysia)	(Malaysia)	
	DC		(Malaysia)	(Malaysia)	
	GK		(Malaysia)	(Malaysia)	
	DF		(Malaysia)	(Malaysia)	
	DF		(Malaysia)	(Malaysia)	
	ST		(Malaysia)	(Malaysia)	

== MOF F.C. ==
=== Transfers in ===
Entry date	Position	No.	Player	From club	Fee
	GK		(Malaysia)	(Malaysia)	
	GK		(Malaysia)	(Malaysia)	
	DF		(Malaysia)	(Malaysia)	
	DF		(Malaysia)	(Malaysia)	
	MF		(Malaysia)	(Malaysia)	
	DC		(Malaysia)	(Malaysia)	
	MF		(Malaysia)	(Malaysia)	
	AMC/ST		(Malaysia)	(Malaysia)	
	DF		(Malaysia)	(Malaysia)	
	ST		(Malaysia)	(Malaysia)	
	ST		(Malaysia)	(Malaysia)	
	DF		(Malaysia)	(Malaysia)	
	DL		(Malaysia)	(Malaysia)	
	DR		(Malaysia)	(Malaysia)	
	DF		(Malaysia)	(Malaysia)	
	AMRL/ST		(Malaysia)	(Malaysia)	
	DF		(Malaysia)	(Malaysia)	

=== Transfers out ===
Exit date	Position	No.	Player	To club	Fee
	ST		(Malaysia)	(Malaysia)	
	DF		(Malaysia)	(Malaysia)	
	MF		(Malaysia)	(Malaysia)	
	MF		(Malaysia)	(Malaysia)	
	MF		(Malaysia)	(Malaysia)	
	ST		(Malaysia)	(Malaysia)	
	MF		(Malaysia)	(Malaysia)	
	MF		(Malaysia)	(Malaysia)	
	MF		(Malaysia)	(Malaysia)	
	D/ML		(Malaysia)	(Malaysia)	
	AMC		(Malaysia)	(Malaysia)	
	MC		(Malaysia)	(Malaysia)	
	DC		(Malaysia)	(Malaysia)	
	GK		(Malaysia)	(Malaysia)	
	DF		(Malaysia)	(Malaysia)	
	DF		(Malaysia)	(Malaysia)	
	ST		(Malaysia)	(Malaysia)	

== PBAPP FC ==
=== Transfers in ===
Entry date	Position	No.	Player	From club	Fee
	GK		(Malaysia)	(Malaysia)	
	GK		(Malaysia)	(Malaysia)	
	DF		(Malaysia)	(Malaysia)	
	DF		(Malaysia)	(Malaysia)	
	MF		(Malaysia)	(Malaysia)	
	DC		(Malaysia)	(Malaysia)	
	MF		(Malaysia)	(Malaysia)	
	AMC/ST		(Malaysia)	(Malaysia)	
	DF		(Malaysia)	(Malaysia)	
	ST		(Malaysia)	(Malaysia)	
	ST		(Malaysia)	(Malaysia)	
	DF		(Malaysia)	(Malaysia)	
	DL		(Malaysia)	(Malaysia)	
	DR		(Malaysia)	(Malaysia)	
	DF		(Malaysia)	(Malaysia)	
	AMRL/ST		(Malaysia)	(Malaysia)	
	DF		(Malaysia)	(Malaysia)	

=== Transfers out ===
Exit date	Position	No.	Player	To club	Fee
	ST		(Malaysia)	(Malaysia)	
	DF		(Malaysia)	(Malaysia)	
	MF		(Malaysia)	(Malaysia)	
	MF		(Malaysia)	(Malaysia)	
	MF		(Malaysia)	(Malaysia)	
	ST		(Malaysia)	(Malaysia)	
	MF		(Malaysia)	(Malaysia)	
	MF		(Malaysia)	(Malaysia)	
	MF		(Malaysia)	(Malaysia)	
	D/ML		(Malaysia)	(Malaysia)	
	AMC		(Malaysia)	(Malaysia)	
	MC		(Malaysia)	(Malaysia)	
	DC		(Malaysia)	(Malaysia)	
	GK		(Malaysia)	(Malaysia)	
	DF		(Malaysia)	(Malaysia)	
	DF		(Malaysia)	(Malaysia)	
	ST		(Malaysia)	(Malaysia)	

== Penjara Malaysia F.C. ==
=== Transfers in ===
Entry date	Position	No.	Player	From club	Fee
	GK		(Malaysia)	(Malaysia)	
	GK		(Malaysia)	(Malaysia)	
	DF		(Malaysia)	(Malaysia)	
	DF		(Malaysia)	(Malaysia)	
	MF		(Malaysia)	(Malaysia)	
	DC		(Malaysia)	(Malaysia)	
	MF		(Malaysia)	(Malaysia)	
	AMC/ST		(Malaysia)	(Malaysia)	
	DF		(Malaysia)	(Malaysia)	
	ST		(Malaysia)	(Malaysia)	
	ST		(Malaysia)	(Malaysia)	
	DF		(Malaysia)	(Malaysia)	
	DL		(Malaysia)	(Malaysia)	
	DR		(Malaysia)	(Malaysia)	
	DF		(Malaysia)	(Malaysia)	
	AMRL/ST		(Malaysia)	(Malaysia)	
	DF		(Malaysia)	(Malaysia)	

== Perlis FA ==
=== Transfers in ===
Entry date	Position	No.	Player	From club	Fee
	GK		(Malaysia)	(Malaysia)	
	GK		(Malaysia)	(Malaysia)	
	DF		(Malaysia)	(Malaysia)	
	DF		(Malaysia)	(Malaysia)	
	MF		(Malaysia) Mohammad Hardi Jaafar	(Malaysia) Perak FA	
	DC		(Malaysia)	(Malaysia)	
	MF		(Malaysia)	(Malaysia)	
	AMC/ST		(Malaysia)	(Malaysia)	
	DF		(Malaysia)	(Malaysia)	
	ST		(Malaysia)	(Malaysia)	
	ST		(Malaysia)	(Malaysia)	
	DF		(Malaysia)	(Malaysia)	
	DL		(Malaysia)	(Malaysia)	
	DR		(Malaysia)	(Malaysia)	
	DF		(Malaysia)	(Malaysia)	
	AMRL/ST		(Malaysia)	(Malaysia)	
	DF		(Malaysia)	(Malaysia)	

=== Transfers out ===
Exit date	Position	No.	Player	To club	Fee
	ST		(Malaysia)	(Malaysia)	
	DF		(Malaysia)	(Malaysia)	
	MF		(Malaysia)	(Malaysia)	
	MF		(Malaysia)	(Malaysia)	
	MF		(Malaysia)	(Malaysia)	
	ST		(Malaysia)	(Malaysia)	
	MF		(Malaysia)	(Malaysia)	
	MF		(Malaysia)	(Malaysia)	
	MF		(Malaysia)	(Malaysia)	
	D/ML		(Malaysia)	(Malaysia)	
	AMC		(Malaysia)	(Malaysia)	
	MC		(Malaysia)	(Malaysia)	
	DC		(Malaysia)	(Malaysia)	
	GK		(Malaysia)	(Malaysia)	
	DF		(Malaysia)	(Malaysia)	
	DF		(Malaysia)	(Malaysia)	
	ST		(Malaysia)	(Malaysia)	

== Real Mulia F.C. ==
=== Transfers in ===
Pos.	Name	From
GK	(Malaysia) Mohd Syamsuri Mustafa	(Malaysia) Free Agents
GK	(Malaysia) Mohd Zairi Hafiezi Idris	(Malaysia) Perlis FA
GK	(Malaysia) Ahmad Saiful Muqri Mohd Sabri	(Malaysia) Shahzan Muda F.C.
DR	(Malaysia) Meor Nasrullah Meor Mohd Ali	(Malaysia) UiTM F.C.
DC	(Malaysia) Shahril Faizal Ahmad Sharifudin	(Malaysia) T-Team F.C.
DR	(Malaysia) A. Puvanarajah	(Malaysia) Sime Darby FC
DL	(Malaysia) Shaik Awish Alkirani Shaik Haron Rashid	(Malaysia) Penang FA
DL	(Malaysia) Amirullah Abdul Razab	(Malaysia) Kuantan FA
DC	(Malaysia) Mohd Shafiq Haffiz Mohamad	(Malaysia) Free Agents
DC	(Malaysia) Mohd Fazli Zulkifli	(Malaysia) Perak FA
D/ML	(Malaysia) Mohd Amri Fazal Mat Nor	(Malaysia) Perlis FA
AMC	(Malaysia) Mohd Badrul Hisani Abdul Rahman	(Malaysia) PBAPP FC
MR	(Malaysia) R. Mathivaanan	(Malaysia) Free Agents
ML	(Malaysia) Muhd Raim Azmi	(Malaysia) Felda United U23
AML	(Malaysia) Ash Hameed	(Malaysia) Kelantan FA
MC	(Malaysia) Khairan Ezuan Razali	(Malaysia) T-Team F.C.
MC	(Malaysia) Mohd Hazrul Shah Abdul Hakim	(Malaysia) PBAPP FC
FW	(Malaysia) Mohd Farizzuan Azhar	(Malaysia) UiTM F.C.
FW	(Malaysia) Wan Mohd Alif Wan Jasmi	(Malaysia) Malacca United F.C.
FW	(Malaysia) Mohd Shafizi Mohd Zain	(Malaysia) Pahang FA
FW	(Malaysia) Mohd Hasrol Syawal Hamid	(Malaysia) T-Team F.C.
MC	(Malaysia) M. Yoganathan	(Malaysia) Sabah FA (April Transfer)

=== Transfer out ===
Pos.	Name	From
MRLC	(Malaysia) Rosli Muda	(Malaysia) AirAsia F.C. (April Transfer)
ST	(Malaysia) Izuddin Mat	(Malaysia) AirAsia F.C. (April Transfer)

== Shahzan Muda F.C. ==
=== Transfers in ===
Entry date	Position	No.	Player	From club	Fee
	GK		(Malaysia)	(Malaysia)	
	GK		(Malaysia)	(Malaysia)	
	DF		(Malaysia)	(Malaysia)	
	DF		(Malaysia)	(Malaysia)	
	MF		(Malaysia)	(Malaysia)	
	DC		(Malaysia)	(Malaysia)	
	MF		(Malaysia)	(Malaysia)	
	AMC/ST		(Malaysia)	(Malaysia)	
	DF		(Malaysia)	(Malaysia)	
	ST		(Malaysia)	(Malaysia)	
	ST		(Malaysia)	(Malaysia)	
	DF		(Malaysia)	(Malaysia)	
	DL		(Malaysia)	(Malaysia)	
	DR		(Malaysia)	(Malaysia)	
	DF		(Malaysia)	(Malaysia)	
	AMRL/ST		(Malaysia)	(Malaysia)	
	DF		(Malaysia)	(Malaysia)	

=== Transfers out ===
Exit date	Position	No.	Player	To club	Fee
	ST		(Malaysia)	(Malaysia)	
	DF		(Malaysia)	(Malaysia)	
	MF		(Malaysia)	(Malaysia)	
	MF		(Malaysia)	(Malaysia)	
	MF		(Malaysia)	(Malaysia)	
	ST		(Malaysia)	(Malaysia)	
	MF		(Malaysia)	(Malaysia)	
	MF		(Malaysia)	(Malaysia)	
	MF		(Malaysia)	(Malaysia)	
	D/ML		(Malaysia)	(Malaysia)	
	AMC		(Malaysia)	(Malaysia)	
	MC		(Malaysia)	(Malaysia)	
	DC		(Malaysia)	(Malaysia)	
	GK		(Malaysia)	(Malaysia)	
	DF		(Malaysia)	(Malaysia)	
	DF		(Malaysia)	(Malaysia)	
	ST		(Malaysia)	(Malaysia)	

== Sungai Ara F.C. ==
=== Transfers in ===
Entry date	Position	No.	Player	From club	Fee
	GK		(Malaysia)	(Malaysia)	
	GK		(Malaysia)	(Malaysia)	
	DF		(Malaysia)	(Malaysia)	
	DF		(Malaysia)	(Malaysia)	
	MF		(Malaysia)	(Malaysia)	
	DC		(Malaysia)	(Malaysia)	
	MF		(Malaysia)	(Malaysia)	
	AMC/ST		(Malaysia)	(Malaysia)	
	DF		(Malaysia)	(Malaysia)	
	ST		(Malaysia)	(Malaysia)	
	ST		(Malaysia)	(Malaysia)	
	DF		(Malaysia)	(Malaysia)	
	DL		(Malaysia)	(Malaysia)	
	DR		(Malaysia)	(Malaysia)	
	DF		(Malaysia)	(Malaysia)	
	AMRL/ST		(Malaysia)	(Malaysia)	
	DF		(Malaysia)	(Malaysia)	

=== Transfers out ===
Exit date	Position	No.	Player	To club	Fee
	ST		(Malaysia)	(Malaysia)	
	DF		(Malaysia)	(Malaysia)	
	MF		(Malaysia)	(Malaysia)	
	MF		(Malaysia)	(Malaysia)	
	MF		(Malaysia)	(Malaysia)	
	ST		(Malaysia)	(Malaysia)	
	MF		(Malaysia)	(Malaysia)	
	MF		(Malaysia)	(Malaysia)	
	MF		(Malaysia)	(Malaysia)	
	D/ML		(Malaysia)	(Malaysia)	
	AMC		(Malaysia)	(Malaysia)	
	MC		(Malaysia)	(Malaysia)	
	DC		(Malaysia)	(Malaysia)	
	GK		(Malaysia)	(Malaysia)	
	DF		(Malaysia)	(Malaysia)	
	DF		(Malaysia)	(Malaysia)	
	ST		(Malaysia)	(Malaysia)	

== UKM F.C. ==
=== Transfers in ===
Entry date	Position	No.	Player	From club	Fee
	GK		(Malaysia)	(Malaysia)	
	GK		(Malaysia)	(Malaysia)	
	DF		(Malaysia)	(Malaysia)	
	DF		(Malaysia)	(Malaysia)	
	MF		(Malaysia)	(Malaysia)	
	DC		(Malaysia)	(Malaysia)	
	MF		(Malaysia)	(Malaysia)	
	AMC/ST		(Malaysia)	(Malaysia)	
	DF		(Malaysia)	(Malaysia)	
	ST		(Malaysia)	(Malaysia)	
	ST		(Malaysia)	(Malaysia)	
	DF		(Malaysia)	(Malaysia)	
	DL		(Malaysia)	(Malaysia)	
	DR		(Malaysia)	(Malaysia)	
	DF		(Malaysia)	(Malaysia)	
	AMRL/ST		(Malaysia)	(Malaysia)	
	DF		(Malaysia)	(Malaysia)	

=== Transfers out ===
Exit date	Position	No.	Player	To club	Fee
	ST		(Malaysia)	(Malaysia)	
	DF		(Malaysia)	(Malaysia)	
	MF		(Malaysia)	(Malaysia)	
	MF		(Malaysia)	(Malaysia)	
	MF		(Malaysia)	(Malaysia)	
	ST		(Malaysia)	(Malaysia)	
	MF		(Malaysia)	(Malaysia)	
	MF		(Malaysia)	(Malaysia)	
	MF		(Malaysia)	(Malaysia)	
	D/ML		(Malaysia)	(Malaysia)	
	AMC		(Malaysia)	(Malaysia)	
	MC		(Malaysia)	(Malaysia)	
	DC		(Malaysia)	(Malaysia)	
	GK		(Malaysia)	(Malaysia)	
	DF		(Malaysia)	(Malaysia)	
	DF		(Malaysia)	(Malaysia)	
	ST		(Malaysia)	(Malaysia)	

== See also ==
- 2015 Malaysia Super League
- 2015 Malaysia Premier League
- 2015 Malaysia FAM League
- 2015 Malaysia FA Cup
- 2015 Malaysia Cup
- 2015 Malaysia President's Cup
- 2015 Malaysia Youth League
