= Mohd Zulkifli Affendi Mohd Zakri =

Malaysian footballer

Zulkifli Affendi Zakri
Personal information
- Full name: Mohd Zulkifli Affendi bin Mohd Zakri
- Date of birth: 14 July 1982 (age 44)
- Place of birth: Kuala Lumpur, Malaysia
- Height: 1.83 m (6 ft 0 in)
- Position: Midfielder

Team information
- Current team: Real Mulia F.C.

Youth career
- 1999–2000: Kuala Lumpur FA President's Cup

Senior career*
Years	Team	Apps	(Gls)
2001–2004	Kuala Lumpur FA	23	(2)
2005–2006	Kedah FA	17	(1)
2006–2007	Perlis FA	26	(2)
2007–2008	DBKL FC	?	(?)
2008–2009	Proton FC	?	(?)
2010–2013	KL SPA FC	92	(16)
2014	Kuala Lumpur FA		
2015–	Real Mulia F.C.		

International career^{‡}
1999–2003	Malaysia under-23	2	(0)
- * Club domestic league appearances and goals as of 5 December 2013 ‡ National team caps and goals as of 5 December 2013

Mohd Zulkifli Affendi Mohd Zakri (born 14 July 1982) is a Malaysian football player. Previously he played and served as captain for club team Kuala Lumpur United. He Currently he plays for FAM League club team Penjara F.C.

He played as a Kuala Lumpur youth and senior player before moving to Kedah before loaned to Perlis at middle of the 2006 season. He then signed with FAM Cup league outfit, DBKL FC before moving to Proton FC.

Mohd Zulkifli has played for Malaysia national youth team.
