= Yunus Alif =

Malaysian football manager (born 1958)

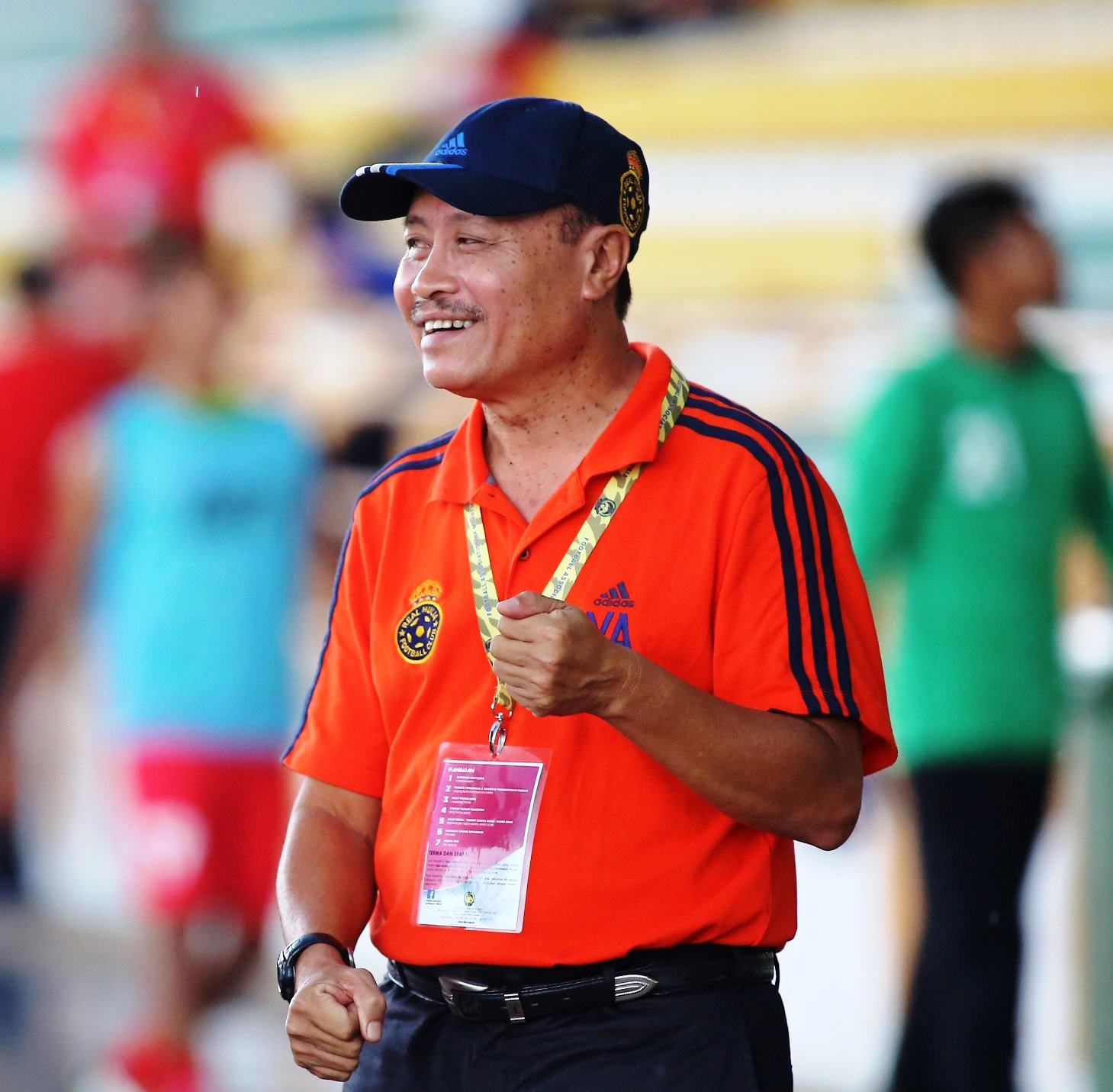
- Yunus coaching Real Mulia in 2015

Personal information
- Full name: Ahmad Yunus bin Mohd Alif
- Date of birth: 27 May 1958 (age 68)
- Place of birth: Terengganu, Malaysia
- Position: Striker

Senior career*
Years	Team	Apps	(Gls)
1976–1978	Terengganu		
1978–1990	Pahang	36	(29)

International career
1978–1987	Malaysia	19	(2)

Managerial career
- 1995–1998: Pahang
- 1998–2000: Terengganu
- 2001–2003: Pahang
- 2003–2004: Penang
- 2005–2008: Terengganu
- 2008–2009: Proton FC
- 2010: Perlis
- 2011–2012: T-Team
- 2013: Perlis
- 2014: PBAPP
- 2015: Real Mulia
- 2023–2024: PDRM
- * Club domestic league appearances and goals

Ahmad Yunus Mohd Alif (born 27 May 1958), better known as Yunus Alif, is a Malaysian football coach and former player. As a player, he spent the majority of his career as a striker for Pahang in its golden era of the 1980s. He was a member of the Malaysia national team.

== Playing career ==
Yunus was born in Terengganu. He played for Terengganu and Pahang, winning the 1983 Malaysia Cup with Pahang. He won the Malaysia Cup Golden Boot in 1984.

Yunus also represented Malaysia national football team from 1978 until 1987. He made his debut in the 1978 King's Cup. He scored in a 2–1 win against Japan at the 1984 Olympic qualification. He also scored against Nepal in a 5–0 win at the 1986 FIFA World Cup qualification.

== Coaching career ==
After his playing career, Yunus stayed with Pahang and started his coaching career as assistant coach to Tajuddin Nor in 1991. When Tajuddin were promoted to team manager in 1995, Yunus was appointed as head coach replacing Tajuddin. He guided Pahang to Malaysia Cup finals in 1995 and 1997, though both times they ended up as runners-up to Selangor. Pahang also won the 1995 M-League title, and runners-up in the 1995 Malaysia FA Cup final with Yunus at the helm.

He was appointed as head coach of Terengganu in 1998, replacing Abdul Rahman Ibrahim who was appointed as new head coach of Malaysia national football team. With Terengganu, Yunus won the 2000 Malaysia FA Cup after being runners-up a year before.

Later he returned to Pahang for two seasons, also taking the job as team manager, before taking the Penang helm as head coach in 2004. After only one season with Penang, he returned to Terengganu, where he held the head coach job for four years until the end of 2008.

In 2009, he was appointed the head coach of club side Proton FC in what was to be the final season of the club in the Malaysia league. In April 2010, he was appointed the new head coach of Perlis, replacing Muhammad Nidzam Adzha.

Yunus returned to Terengganu when club side PBDKT T-Team appointed him as head coach in 2011. After ending his contract with T-Team in 2012, he returned to Perlis as head coach for the 2013 Malaysia Premier League campaign. Yunus moved again after the season ended, this time to 2014 Malaysia Premier League newcomers PBAPP. He was appointed as head coach of Real Mulia for 2015 Malaysia FAM League.

On 5 August 2023, Yunus was appointed the new head coach of Malaysia Super League club PDRM making this his first coaching job in eight years after his took on the role of the head coach in 2015 for Real Mulia.

== Personal life ==
His brothers Abdah Alif and Najib Alif were also footballers, with Abdah also played with Malaysia.

== Honours ==
=== Player ===
Pahang

- Malaysia League: 1987; runner-up 1984
- Malaysia Cup: 1983; runner-up 1984

Individual

- M-League Golden Boot: 1984

Malaysia

- King's Cup: 1978
- SEA Games silver medals: 1981, 1987

=== Manager ===
Pahang

- Liga Perdana: 1995
- Malaysia Cup runner-up: 1995, 1997
- Malaysia FA Cup runner-up: 1995

Terengganu

- Malaysia FA Cup: 2000; runner-up 1999

PDRM

- MFL Challenge Cup: 2023
