= G. Jeevananthan =

Malaysian footballer

Jeevananthan Gunasekaran
Personal information
- Full name: Jeevananthan A/L Gunasekaran
- Date of birth: 13 March 1980 (age 46)
- Place of birth: Kluang, Johor, Malaysia
- Height: 1.82 m (5 ft 11 1/2 in)
- Position: Goalkeeper

Senior career*
Years	Team	Apps	(Gls)
2000–2005	Johor Darul Takzim	18	(0)
2005–2006	Public Bank	21	(0)
2007–2008	Sabah	26	(0)
2008–2010	Johor Darul Takzim	41	(0)
2011	USM FC	19	(0)
2011	→ Selangor (loan)	10	(0)
2012	Selangor	13	(0)
2013	ATM	2	(0)
2014	Penang	17	(0)
2015–2017	PKNS FC	31	(0)

International career^{‡}
2011–2012	Malaysia	2	(0)
- * Club domestic league appearances and goals as of January 24, 2017 ‡ National team caps and goals as of January 24, 2017

Gunasekaran Jeevananthan (born 13 March 1980) is a Malaysian football player who plays as a goalkeeper.

== Career ==
Kluang-born Jeevanathan donned Johor FC colours for five years from 2000 until he left for Public Bank. A year later he moved to Sabah for a two-year stint. He returned to Johor FC in 2008 and helped the team to their best-ever finish in the Super League - third place, behind champions Kedah and runners-up Negeri Sembilan. Johor FC also reached their first ever Malaysia Cup semifinals that year.

He played for USM FC in the 2011 Malaysia Premier League season, and then loaned out to Selangor FA for the 2011 Malaysia Cup campaign. He completed his permanent transfer to Selangor for the 2012 season.

== International career ==
He was called up for national training twice in 2002 and 2004. His first national call-up was for Malaysia's friendly match against Brazil. He was the third choice goalkeeper on the bench after Azmin Azram Abdul Aziz and Mohd Syamsuri Mustafa.

In October 2011, he was called for national training for friendly matches against India. He made his debut for the national team, at the age of 31, in the second friendly game against India, where Malaysia lost 2–3.
