= Zuraindey Jumai =

Malaysian footballer

Personal information
- Full name: Zuraindey Bin Jumai
- Date of birth: 30 March 1980 (age 46)
- Place of birth: Tuaran, Sabah, Malaysia
- Height: 1.66 m (5 ft 5 in)
- Position: Midfielder

Team information
- Current team: Sabah FA
- Number: 2

Senior career*
| Years | Team | Apps | (Gls) |
| 2006–2007 | Sabah FA | 19 | (0) |
| 2008–2010 | Perlis FA | 33 | (2) |
| 2011 | Sabah FA | 28 | (1) |
| 2012 | →Perak FA (loan) | 7 | (0) |
| 2013–2014 | Kedah FA | 32 | (1) |
| 2015 | Sabah FA | 10 | (0) |
| 2016 | KDMM FC | 0 | (0) |

International career^{‡}
| 2001 | Malaysia U-21 | 1 | (0) |
- * Club domestic league appearances and goals as of 9 May 2014 ‡ National team caps and goals as of 9 May 2014

Zuraindey bin Jumai (born 30 March 1980) is a Malaysian footballer from the state of Sabah. Currently he plays for Kedah FA.

Other than his home state team Sabah, Zuraindey also have played for Perlis FA. He also played for Perak FA for the duration of 2012 Malaysia Cup, on loan from Sabah FA.
