= Proton F.C. =

Malaysian football club

Proton FC
- Full name: Proton Football Club
- Founded: 1986; 40 years ago
- Ground: MBPJ Stadium; Petaling Jaya, Selangor, Malaysia
- Capacity: 25,000
- Chairman: (Malaysia) Yusri Yusuf
- Manager: (Malaysia) Razak Majid
- Coach: (Italy) Paolo Tirinnanzi
- League: Selangor League
| Home colours | Away colours |

Proton FC (Malay: Kelab Bolasepak Proton) was a team in the Malaysian Premier League football competition, sponsored by Malaysian national carmaker Proton. The team was based in Shah Alam, Selangor, Malaysia. They played in the second level in Malaysian football, the Malaysia Premier League. Their home stadium was the MBPJ Stadium, Petaling Jaya, Selangor, Malaysia. The currently competing in Selangor League.

== Honours ==
| Title | Winners | Runners-up |
|---|---|---|
| Malaysian FAM Cup | 2007 (1x) | |

== Achievements ==
| Year | Position | League | FA Cup | Malaysia Cup |
|---|---|---|---|---|
| 2007 | Champion | Malaysia FAM Cup | Not Qualify | Not Qualify |
| 2008 | 7/13 | Malaysia Premier League | 2nd Round | Not Qualify |
| 2009 | 5/13 | Malaysia Premier League | 2nd Round | Not Qualify |

== Staff and Coach ==
- Team Manager: Razak Majid
- Assistant manager: Azhar Noordin
- Head coach: Paolo Tirinnanzi
- Assistant coach: Kamarulzaman Talib
- Goalkeeper coach:
- Physio :
- Fitness coach :

== Current squad ==
Note: Flags indicate national team as defined under FIFA eligibility rules; some limited exceptions apply. Players may hold more than one non-FIFA nationality.

| No. | Pos. | Nation | Player |
|---|---|---|---|
| 1 | GK | MAS | Mohd Syamil Baharuddin |
| 2 | DF | MAS | Ahmad Daniel Haiqal |
| 3 | DF | MAS | Zainor Shahrin |
| 4 | DF | MAS | Mohd Shahlan Zakaria |
| 5 | DF | ITA | Paolo Tirinnanzi |
| 6 | MF | MAS | Mohd Zakuan Baharudin |
| 7 | MF | MAS | Lucas Tan |
| 8 | MF | ITA | Alessandro Francesconi |
| 9 | FW | DEN | Mathias Hermansen |
| 10 | FW | MAS | Syafiq Ahmad (captain) |
| 11 | FW | MAS | N.Thanabalan |
| 12 | FW | MAS | Mohd Zulhilmi Othman |

| No. | Pos. | Nation | Player |
|---|---|---|---|
| 13 | DF | MAS | Hariri Mohamed Azmi |
| 14 | DF | MAS | Mohd Amirul Hisham Ismail |
| 15 | MF | MAS | Nik Mohd Faris Iskandar Che Mohd Za'ba |
| 16 | MF | MAS | Aliff Akmal Lukman |
| 17 | MF | MAS | Saiful Hisham Sahar |
| 18 | MF | MAS | Kamarulzaman Kamarudin |
| 19 | MF | MAS | Muhammad Khalil Alwi |
| 20 | DF | MAS | Mohd Nazri Yusof |
| 21 | MF | MAS | Shahrul Izwan Syukri |
| 22 | DF | MAS | Cayden Ang |

== Managers ==
| Year | Manager |
|---|---|
| 2005–2009 | (Malaysia) Tengku Azizan Tengku Ahmad |

== Coaches ==
| Year | Manager |
|---|---|
| 2007–08 | (Malaysia) Mohd Razali Alias |
| 2008 | (Malaysia) Abdul Mutalib Ahmad |
| 2008–2009 | (Malaysia) Ahmad Yunus Mohd Alif |
| 2013 | (Italy) Paolo Tirinnanzi |

== Former notable player-coach ==
- (Italy) Paolo Tirinnanzi
