= Syamsuri Mustafa =

Malaysian footballer

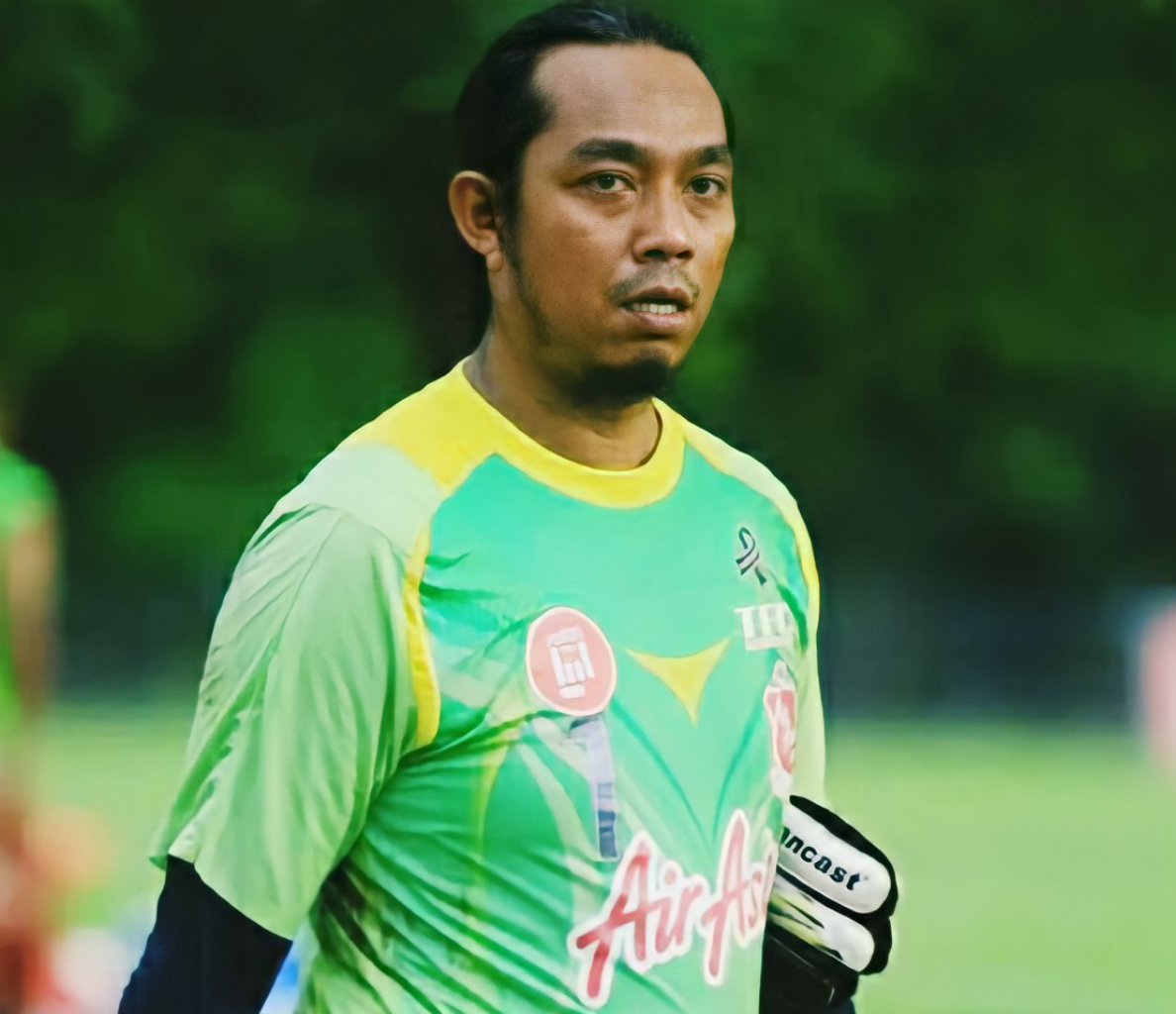
- Syamsuri Mustafa in 2015

Personal information
- Full name: Mohammad Syamsuri bin Mustafa
- Date of birth: 6 February 1981 (age 45)
- Place of birth: Pahang, Malaysia
- Height: 1.82 m (6 ft 0 in)
- Position: Goalkeeper

Senior career*
Years	Team	Apps	(Gls)
2001–2007	Terengganu		
2008	Pahang		
2009–2012	T-Team		
2013	Sabah		
2015–2016	Real Mulia		
2016	Petaling Jaya Rangers	12	(0)
2017	Terengganu City	10	(0)
2018	Hanelang		

International career^{‡}
1999–2001	Malaysia U23		(1)
2001–2009	Malaysia	34	(0)
- * Club domestic league appearances and goals as of January 6, 2018 ‡ National team caps and goals as of December 31, 2015

Mohammad Syamsuri bin Mustafa (born 6 February 1981) is a former Malaysian footballer who played as a goalkeeper.

== Club career ==
Before moved to Pahang, he was the primary goalkeeper for Terengganu. His biggest achievement with Terengganu was being a runner up in the 2004 Malaysia FA Cup. Terengganu lost 3-0 after conceding three goals in extra time against Perak. For 2009 season, Syamsuri returned to Terengganu but this time with T-Team.

== International career ==
He was part of the Malaysia national team and Malaysia League XI that faced Brazil and Manchester United in 2002. He also represented Malaysia in the 2001 and 2003 SEA Games, the 2002 Tiger Cup, the 2004 Tiger Cup, and the 2007 ASEAN Football Championship. At the 2003 SEA Games in Vietnam, Syamsuri became the first Malaysian goalkeeper to score a goal in an international match. He scored a long range goal from a drop kick from his own penalty area in Malaysia's 3-4 defeat against hosts Vietnam.

In 2007, Syamsuri did not take part in Malaysia's disastrous 2007 AFC Asian Cup performance on disciplinary grounds. He has not been called up for the national squad since his last appearance against Sri Lanka on 26 March 2007.

In his return with the national team, he played 68 minutes and conceded three goals against the UAE.

== Honours ==
=== Club ===
Terengganu

- Malaysia FA Cup runner-up: 2004

T-Team

- Malaysia Premier League promotion: 2009

=== International ===
Malaysia U-23

- Silver Medalist 2001 SEA Games

Malaysia

- Third Place 2004 AFF Championship

=== Individual ===
- FAM Football Awards – Best Goalkeeper Award: 2005-06 – Terengganu
- FAM Football Awards – Most Popular Award: 2005-06 –Terengganu

=== Records ===
- The first Asian goalkeeper to score the longest goal: 2003
- The18.com the longest goals of all time(est. 95-100 yards): 6th place 2021

== See also ==
- List of goalscoring goalkeepers
