= Real Mulia F.C. =

Malaysian football club

- Full name: Real Mulia Football Club
- Nickname: The Kings (Pasukan Diraja)
- Short name: RMFC
- Founded: 2014; 12 years ago
- Ground: Maybank Stadium
- Capacity: 2,000
- Owner: Tengku Fahad Mua'adzam Shah
- Chairman: Tengku Fahad Mua'adzam Shah
- Head coach: Yunus Aliff
- League: Malaysia FAM League
Home colours	Away colours

Real Mulia Football Club, commonly known as Real Mulia, simply as Real, was a Malaysian professional football club. Founded in the end of 2014 as Kelab Bolasepak Real Mulia, the team has traditionally worn a dark blue home kit. The word Real is a Spanish for royal and was bestowed to the club by Tengku Fahd Mua'adzam together with the crown in the emblem. The team has played its home matches in the 2,000-capacity Maybank Stadium in downtown Bangi. Real Mulia formerly played in the third-tier division of Malaysian football, the Malaysia FAM League. In 2015, the club has pulled from the league for financial reasons.

== History ==
Yunus Alif became the first ever club head coach of Real Mulia. Later, it was announced that Azlan Bin Ahmad will be his assistant. Yunus has expressed desire to build a "modern football team" in line with his philosophy. Yunus managed to establish a football squad within a short period of time of only two months for 2015 Malaysia FAM League campaign. To balance the squad, Yunus decided to recruited several experienced players, mostly a former regulars from Malaysia Super League, most notably former Malaysia national football team goalkeeper Mohd Syamsuri Mustafa. Real Mulia also appointed former Perth Glory coach and Socceroo international Alistair Edwards as a club technical director.

== Kit manufacturers and shirt sponsors ==
Period	Kit manufacturer	Shirt partner
2014–2015	Adidas	TF 1M (home), Mulia Interlink Construction Sdn Bhd (away)

== Rivalries ==
Matches against fellow Bangi UKM and The Royals Derby Shahzan Muda from Pahang were the local rivalries.

== Personnel (2015) ==
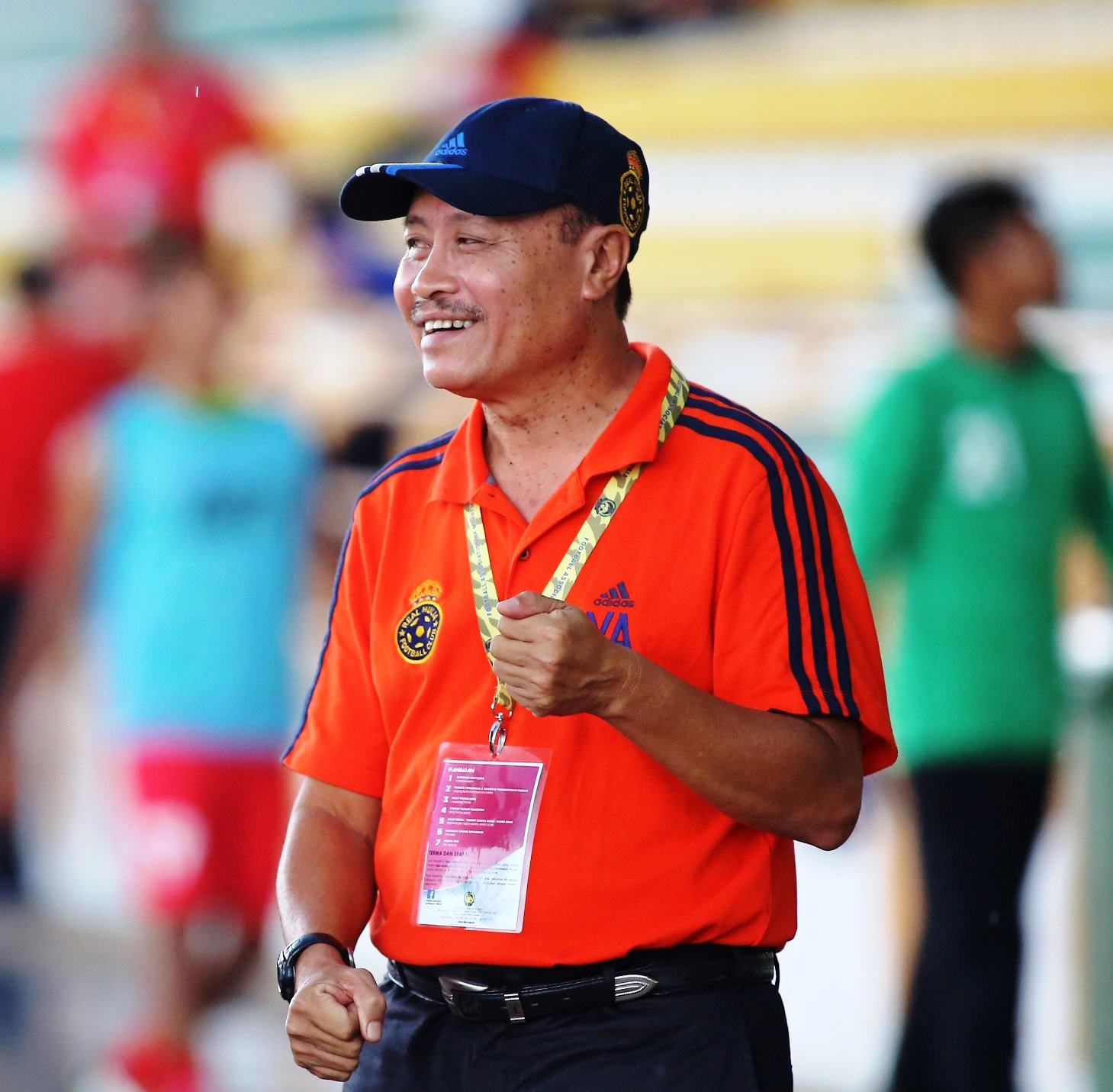
Yunus Aliff became the first Real Mulia head coach

=== Management ===
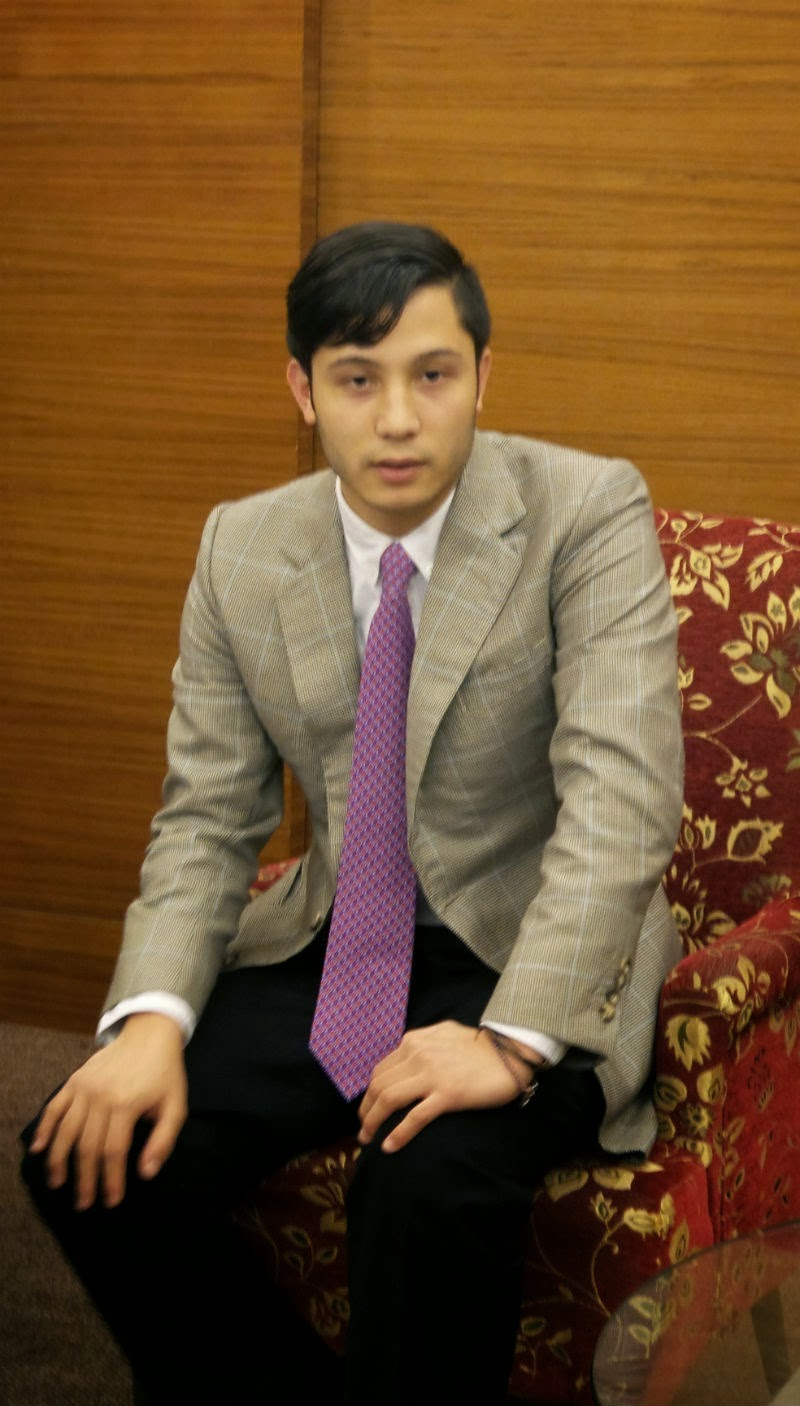
Sultan Haji Ahmad Shah youngest son YAM Tengku Arif Temenggong Tengku Fahd Mua'adzam Shah was their first president

Position	Staff
President	YAM Tengku Arif Temenggong Tengku Fahd Mua'adzam Shah Sultan Haji Ahmad Shah
Deputy-president	Datuk Seri Abang Aditajaya Abang Alwi
General manager	Dato' Puan Jeyamalar Somasundram

- Last updated: 1 March 2015
