= 2014 in Malaysian football =

Football in Malaysia
- Season: 2014

Men's football
- Super League: Johor DT
- Premier League: PDRM
- FAM League: Kuantan FA
- FA Cup: Pahang FA
- Malaysia Cup: Pahang FA
- Community Shield: Pahang FA

The 2014 season will be the 35th season of competitive association football in Malaysia.

== Promotion and relegation ==
=== Pre-season ===
League	Promoted to league	Relegated from league
Super League	Sarawak FA; Sime Darby	Felda United; Negeri Sembilan FA
Premier League	Penang FA; PBAPP FC	Kuala Lumpur FA; Betaria FC

== New teams ==
- Kuantan FA (FAM League)
- Tumpat FA (FAM League)
- Cebagoo FC (FAM League)
- Harimau Muda C (FAM League)
- PB Melayu Kedah (FAM League)
- Perak YBU FC (FAM League)

== National team ==
=== Malaysia national football team ===
Date	Opponent	Score*	Venue	Competition	Malaysia scorers
1 March	Philippines	0–0 (D)	Selayang Municipal Council Stadium, Selayang (H)	Friendly	
5 March	Yemen	2–1 (W)	Tahnoun bin Mohammed Stadium, Al Ain (A)	2015 AFC Asian Cup qualification	Amri 16'; Fakri 77'
27 April	Philippines	0–0 (D)	Cebu City Sports Complex, Cebu City (A)	Friendly	
8 August	Tajikistan	1–4 (L)	Pamir Stadium, Dushanbe (A)	Friendly	Amri 43' (pen.)
14 September	Indonesia	0–2 (L)	Gelora Delta Stadium, Sidoarjo (A)	Friendly	
20 September	Cambodia	4–1 (W)	Shah Alam Stadium, Shah Alam (H)	Friendly	Kalang Tie 8', 65'; Daravorn 15' (o.g.); Baddrol 82'
12 November	Syria	0–3 (L)	Shah Alam Stadium, Shah Alam (H)	Friendly	
16 November	Vietnam	1–3 (L)	Mỹ Đình National Stadium, Hanoi (A)	Friendly	Amri 22'
23 November	Myanmar	0–0 (D)	Jalan Besar Stadium, Singapore (A)	2014 AFF Championship	
26 November	Thailand	2–3 (L)	Jalan Besar Stadium, Singapore (A)	2014 AFF Championship	Amri 28'; Safiq 60'
29 November	Singapore	3–1 (W)	New Singapore National Stadium, Kallang, Singapore (A)	2014 AFF Championship	Safee 61'; Safiq 90+3' (pen.); Putra 90+5'
7 December	Vietnam	1–2 (L)	Shah Alam Stadium, Shah Alam (H)	2014 AFF Championship	Safiq 14' (pen.)
11 December	Vietnam	4–2 (W)	Mỹ Đình National Stadium, Hanoi (A)	2014 AFF Championship	Safiq 4' (pen.); Norshahrul 16'; Đinh Tiến Thành 29' (o.g.); Shukor 43'
17 December	Thailand	0–2 (L)	Rajamangala Stadium, Bangkok (A)	2014 AFF Championship	
20 December	Thailand	3–2 (W)	Bukit Jalil National Stadium, Kuala Lumpur (H)	2014 AFF Championship	Safiq 7' (pen.), 58'; Putra 45+2'

== League season ==
=== Super league ===
Pos	Team	Pld	W	D	L	GF	GA	GD	Pts	Qualification or relegation
1	Johor Darul Ta'zim	22	13	5	4	39	22	+17	44	2015 AFC Champions League qualifying play-off
2	Selangor	22	12	5	5	28	19	+9	41	
3	Pahang	22	11	4	7	36	30	+6	37	2015 AFC Cup group stage (Note: Qualified as 2014 Piala FA winners)
4	Terengganu	22	10	6	6	38	28	+10	36	
5	Sime Darby	22	9	4	9	32	32	0	31	
6	Kelantan	22	10	1	11	26	29	−3	31	
7	Sarawak	22	9	3	10	26	31	−5	30	
8	LionsXII (Note: LionsXII are not eligible for any AFC competition spots)	22	8	4	10	26	27	−1	28	
9	Perak	22	8	2	12	22	27	−5	26	
10	ATM	22	6	6	10	29	34	−5	24	
11	T–Team	22	6	6	10	21	28	−7	24	Relegation to 2015 Liga Premier
12	PKNS	22	4	6	12	24	40	−16	18	Relegation to 2015 Liga Premier

Source: RSSSF, FAM Official Site, Astro Arena
Rules for classification: 1) points; 2) goal difference; 3) number of goals scored

=== Premier league ===
Pos	Team	Pld	W	D	L	GF	GA	GD	Pts	Promotion or relegation
1	PDRM (C, P)	22	16	4	2	63	23	+40	52	Promotion to Liga Super
2	Felda United (P)	22	15	5	2	58	26	+32	50	Promotion to Liga Super
3	Penang	22	13	5	4	41	30	+11	44	
4	Kedah	22	11	5	6	43	25	+18	38	
5	Johor Darul Ta'zim II	22	9	8	5	30	26	+4	35	
6	Negeri Sembilan	22	8	6	8	26	28	−2	30	
7	DRB-Hicom	22	6	5	11	32	34	−2	23	
8	Sabah	22	6	5	11	21	30	−9	23	
9	UiTM	22	5	7	10	22	28	−6	22	
10	SPA	22	5	7	10	23	41	−18	22	
11	Perlis (R)	22	2	6	14	21	50	−29	12	Relegation to Liga FAM
12	PBAPP (R)	22	1	6	15	16	45	−29	9	Relegation to Liga FAM

Source: FAM Official Site, Astro Arena
Rules for classification: 1) Points; 2) Goal difference; 3) Number of goals scored
(C) Champions; (P) Promoted; (R) Relegated

=== FAM League ===
Pos	Team	Pld	W	D	L	GF	GA	GD	Pts	Promotion
1	Kuantan FA	22	15	3	4	40	18	+22	48	Promotion to 2015 Malaysia Premier League
2	Kuala Lumpur FA	22	12	7	3	34	16	+18	43	Promotion to 2015 Malaysia Premier League
3	Shahzan Muda FC	22	12	2	8	34	24	+10	38	
4	Harimau Muda C	22	11	4	7	33	24	+9	37	
5	Kedah Malays FA	22	10	4	8	25	31	−6	34	
6	Malacca United F.C.	22	8	4	10	34	37	−3	28	
7	Cebagoo	22	7	6	9	25	32	−7	27	
8	Hanelang F.C.	22	7	4	11	22	31	−9	25	
9	MISC-MIFA	22	6	5	11	28	37	−9	23	
10	MOF F.C.	22	5	7	10	26	36	−10	22	
11	Sungai Ara F.C.	22	3	11	8	20	24	−4	20	
12	YBU F.C	22	4	7	11	24	34	−10	19	

Updated to match(es) played on 25 June 2014. Source: MFL Official Site
Rules for classification: 1) points; 2) goal difference; 3) number of goals scored.

== Domestic Cups ==
=== Community Shield ===
17 January 2014
20:45 PDT

Pahang	1 – 0	LionsXII
Matías Conti 80'

Darul Makmur Stadium, Kuantan, Pahang
Attendance: 40,000
Referee: Nagor Amir Mohamad Nor

=== FA Cup ===
First round
(Terengganu) T–Team	3
(Selangor) UiTM	2
Kuala Lumpur	0
Kedah	4
Malacca United	1
Perlis	2
(Penang) PBAPP	2
(Sabah) Cebagoo	0
(Malaysia) PDRM	1
(Kuala Lumpur) Putrajaya SPA	0
LionsXII	3
(Kuala Lumpur) DRB-Hicom	0
Perak	2(4)
Pahang(p)	2(5)
(Pahang) Kuantan	0
Sabah	1
(Selangor) PKNS	3
Johor Darul Takzim II	2
Terengganu	4
(Pahang) Shahzan Muda	0
(Kuala Lumpur) Sime Darby	2
(Malaysia) ATM	1
Negeri Sembilan	0
(Kuala Lumpur) FELDA United	1
(Malaysia) Harimau Muda C	0
Selangor	2
Sarawak(aet)	2
Penang	1

Second round
Johor Darul Takzim	3
(Terengganu) T–Team	0
Kedah	4
Perlis	0
(Penang) PBAPP	0
(Malaysia) PDRM	2
(Singapore) LionsXII	1
Pahang	2
Kelantan	2
Sabah	1
(Selangor) PKNS	2
Terengganu	1
(Kuala Lumpur) Sime Darby	0
(Kuala Lumpur) FELDA United	1
Selangor	0
Sarawak	1

Quarter-finals
Johor Darul Takzim	3	2	5
Kedah	1	0	1
(Malaysia) PDRM FA	1	1	2
Pahang	1	2	3
Kelantan	3	3	6
(Selangor) PKNS	2	3	5
(Kuala Lumpur) FELDA United	0	2	2 a.g.r.
Sarawak	0	2	2

Semi-finals
Johor Darul Takzim	1	0	1
Pahang	1	1	2
Kelantan	3	2	5
(Kuala Lumpur) FELDA United	3	2	5 a.g.r.

Final
Pahang	2
(Kuala Lumpur) FELDA United	1

==== Final ====
Saturday, 7 June
20:45 UTC+08:00

Pahang	2 – 1	(Kuala Lumpur) Felda United
Mohd Faizol Hussien 79'; Dickson Nwakaeme 88'	Report	Edward Junior Wilson 22'

Shah Alam Stadium, Shah Alam
Attendance: 60,000
Referee: Shamsudin Ibrahim

=== Malaysia Cup ===
Quarter-finals
A1	Felda United (Kuala Lumpur)	4	3	7
D2	Selangor	0	3	3
C1	Johor Darul Takzim	0	3	3
B2	Terengganu	0	1	1
B1	Kedah	1	3	4
C2	Kelantan	3	0	3
D1	PDRM (Malaysia)	1	1	2
A2	Pahang	1	2	3

Semi-finals
Felda United (Kuala Lumpur)	4	1	5
Johor Darul Takzim	3	3	6
Kedah	3	0	3
Pahang	1	5	6

Final
Johor Darul Takzim	2
Pahang	2

==== Final ====
1 November 2014
20:45 MST

Johor Darul Takzim	2–2 (a.e.t.)	Pahang
Jorge Pereyra Díaz 31'; Matías Conti 34'		Dickson Nwakaeme 15', 71'
Penalties
Figueroa (penalty scored); Diaz (penalty scored); Harun (penalty scored); Norshahrul (penalty missed)	3–5	(penalty scored) Roslan; (penalty scored) Stewart; (penalty scored) Shahrizan; (penalty scored) Rehman; (penalty scored) Hafiz

Bukit Jalil National Stadium, Bukit Jalil, Kuala Lumpur
Attendance: 90,000
Referee: Nagor Amir Mohamad Nor
