= 2013 Malaysia FAM League =

Malaysia FAM League
- Season: 2013
- Champions: Penang FA; 5th title
- Promoted: Penang FA; PBAPP FC
- Matches: 110
- Goals: 344 (3.13 per match)
- Top goalscorer: Norizam Salaman (Penang FA) (12 goals)
- Biggest home win: Tentera Darat 6–0 Cebagoo FC (2 June 2013)
- Biggest away win: PB Melayu Kedah 0–7 PBAPP FC (6 March 2013)
- Highest scoring: PB Melayu Kedah 2–7 Penang FA (6 March 2013)
- Longest winning run: Penang FA (11 matches)
- Longest unbeaten run: Penang FA (11 matches)
- Longest winless run: PB Melayu Kedah; Cebagoo FC (8 matches)
- Longest losing run: Shahzan Muda FC (5 matches)

The 2013 Malaysia FAM League (referred to as the FAM League) is the 61st season of the FAM League since its establishment in 1952. The league is currently the third level football league in Malaysia. The season began on 17 February 2013. Suruhanjaya Perkhidmatan Awam FC are the defending champions, having won their first league title the previous season.

Penang won the league for the 5th time in the league history after beating Shahzan Muda on 2 June 2013. This is the first FAM League title Penang has won since 1957. PBAPP FC, another team from Penang, also were promoted after capturing second place.

== Season changes ==
The following teams have changed division since the 2012 season.

=== To Malaysia FAM League ===
New Team

- (Pahang) Kuantan FA
- (Kelantan) Tumpat FA
- (Sabah) Cebagoo FC
- (Malaysia) Harimau Muda C
- PB Melayu Kedah
- Perak YBU FC

=== From Malaysia FAM League ===
Promoted to 2013 Malaysia Premier League

- (Kuala Lumpur) KL SPA FC
- (Selangor) UiTM FC

Teams withdrawn

- (Johor) MP Muar FC (From 2012 Malaysia Premier League)
- Penang USM FC (From 2012 Malaysia Premier League)
- (Johor) MBJB FC (From 2012 Malaysia Premier League)
- (Johor) Melodi Jaya S.C.
- (Penang) SDM Navy Kepala Batas F.C.

== Teams ==
The following teams participated in the 2013 Malaysia FAM League. In order by the number given by FAM:-

- (Perak) YBU FC
- (Pahang) Kuantan FA
- Malacca FA
- (Penang) PBAPP FC
- Penang FA
- (Pahang) Shahzan Muda SC
- PB Melayu Kedah
- (Sabah) Cebagoo FC
- (Kelantan) Tumpat FA
- Tentera Darat F.A.
- (Malaysia) Harimau Muda C

== Teams ==
Location of teams in 2013 Malaysia FAM League

=== Team summaries ===
==== Stadium ====
Team	Location	Stadium	Stadium capacity^{1}
Perak YBU FC	Ipoh	Perak Stadium	40,000
(Pahang) Kuantan FA	Kuantan	Darulmakmur Stadium	40,000
(Sabah) Cebagoo FC	Sepanggar	UMS Stadium	3,000
PB Melayu Kedah	Kedah	Jitra Mini Stadium	300
Malacca FA	Malacca	Hang Tuah Stadium	15,000
(Penang) PBAPP FC	Penang	Bandaraya Stadium	20,000
Penang FA	Penang	Bandaraya Stadium	20,000
(Pahang) Shahzan Muda FC	Temerloh	Temerloh Mini Stadium	4,000
Tentera Darat F.A.	Kuala Lumpur	Football Field, Batu Kentomen Camp	500
(Kelantan) Tumpat FA	Tumpat	Sultan Muhammad IV Stadium	30,000
(Malaysia) Harimau Muda C	Kuala Lumpur	various	100

==== Personnel and kits ====
Note: Flags indicate national team as has been defined under FIFA eligibility rules. Players and Managers may hold more than one non-FIFA nationality.

Team	Coach	Captain	Kit manufacturer	Shirt sponsor
Perak YBU FC	Salim Abdul Wahab	Mohd Arif Fazlie Saidin	Joma	YBU
Kuantan FA	Abu Bakar Samad	Abdul Rahman Abdul Kadir	Nike	Tafcom
Cebagoo FC	Razali Mohammad Zinin	Mohd Reithaudin Awang Emran	Carino	Ararat Sports & Souvenirs
PB Melayu Kedah	Roshidi Shaari	Mohamad Rozaidi Abdul Rahim	kool	BNS
Malacca FA	Mohd Asri Ninggal	Mohd Fauzzi Kassim	Arora	FA Malacca
PBAPP FC	Zabidi Hassan	Mat Saiful Mohamad	Kappa	PBAPP
Penang FA	Merzagua Abderrazzak	Mohd Zharif Hasna	Joma	FA Penang
Shahzan Muda FC	Tajuddin Nor	Muhd Helmi Abdullah	Kappa	FA Pahang
Tentera Darat F.A.	Ahmad Fuad Karim	Faizal Hamzah	Puma	ATM
Tumpat FA	Wan Rohaimi Wan Ismail	Tuan Norisham	Kappa	KPRK Bhd
Harimau Muda C	Aminuddin Hussin	Mohd Raphi Azizan Mariappen	Nike	FAM

== League table ==
Pos	Team	Pld	W	D	L	GF	GA	GD	Pts	Promotion
1	Penang (C, P)	20	17	1	2	53	18	+35	52	Promotion to 2014 Malaysia Premier League
2	PBAPP FC (P)	20	13	2	5	40	15	+25	41	Promotion to 2014 Malaysia Premier League
3	Tentera Darat F.A.	20	12	2	6	50	32	+18	38	Withdrew from FAM League.
4	Harimau Muda C	20	10	5	5	37	25	+12	35	
5	Kuantan FA	20	10	5	5	39	28	+11	35	
6	Malacca FA	20	10	3	7	30	30	0	33	
7	Cebagoo FC	20	4	6	10	20	35	−15	18	
8	Tumpat FA	20	4	4	12	18	35	−17	16	Withdrew from FAM League.
9	Shahzan Muda FC	20	3	6	11	16	32	−16	15	
10	PB Melayu Kedah	20	4	4	12	20	57	−37	16	
11	Perak YBU FC	20	2	4	14	21	37	−16	10	

Updated to match(es) played on 25 June 2013. Source: MFL Official Site
Rules for classification: 1) points; 2) goal difference; 3) number of goals scored.
(C) Champions; (P) Promoted

=== Fixtures and results ===
==== Week 1 ====
10 March	Perak YBU FC	1–3	Tentera Darat F.A.	UKM Stadium, Selangor

17 February	Shahzan Muda FC	1–2	PB Melayu Kedah	Temerloh Mini Stadium, Pahang

17 February	Penang FA	3–0	Kuantan FA	City Stadium, Penang
16:45 UTC+08:00	Khairul Anwar Idris; Mohd Baser Napae; Elias Sulaiman

17 February	Kelantan Tumpat FC	0–1	PBAPP FC	Sultan Mohammad IV Stadium, Kelantan
			Zaihisham Md Saad

17 February	Cebagoo FC	2–0	Malacca FA	UMS Stadium, Sabah

=== Week 2 ===
27 February	Shahzan Muda FC	1–0	Perak YBU FC	Temerloh Mini Stadium, Pahang

24 February	Malacca FA	0–2	Harimau Muda C	Hang Tuah Stadium, Malacca
	0		2

24 February	Kuantan FA	3–3	Tumpat FA	Darulmakmur Stadium, Pahang
	3		3

6 March	Tumpat FA	1–2	PB Melayu Kedah	Sultan Mohammad IV Stadium, Kelantan

=== Week 3 ===
3 March	Perak YBU FC	2–3	Penang FA	Perak Stadium, Perak

3 March	PBAPP FC	1–1	Malacca FA	City Stadium, Penang

3 March	Tentera Darat F.A.	4–2	Tumpat FA	Football Field, Batu Kentomen Camp, Kuala Lumpur

3 March	PB Melayu Kedah	0–1	Cebagoo FC	Jitra Mini Stadium, Kedah

=== Week 4 ===
March	Tentera Darat F.A.	0–1	Shahzan Muda FC	Football Field, Batu Kentomen Camp, Kuala Lumpur

6 March	PBAPP FC	1–0	Cebagoo FC	City Stadium, Penang

6 March	PB Melayu Kedah	2–7	Penang FA	Jitra Mini Stadium, Kedah
			Norizam; Danial; Elias (2); Darwira; Baser; Fitri

=== Week 5 ===
10 March	Penang FA	3–1	Shahzan Muda FC	City Stadium, Penang
	Mohd Norizam Salaman (2); Danial Fadzly Abdullah

10 March	Tumpat FA	1–0	Perak YBU FC	Sultan Mohammad IV Stadium, Kelantan

10 March	Cebagoo FC	2–3	Tentera Darat F.A.	UMS Stadium, Sabah

10 March	Harimau Muda C	0–0	PB Melayu Kedah	Wisma FAM, Kuala Lumpur

10 March	Malacca FA	1–1	Kuantan FA	Hang Tuah Stadium, Malacca

=== Week 6 ===
17 March	Perak YBU FC	0–2	Cebagoo FC	Perak Stadium, Perak

17 March	PB Melayu Kedah	1–2	Malacca	Jitra Mini Stadium, Kedah

17 March	Tentera Darat F.A.	4–4	Harimau Muda C	Football Field, Batu Kentomen Camp, Kuala Lumpur

17 March	Shahzan Muda FC	1–2	Tumpat FA	Temerloh Mini Stadium, Pahang

17 March	Kuantan FA	1–2	PBAPP FC	Perak Stadium, Perak

=== Week 7 ===
20 March	Harimau Muda C	2–3	PBAPP FC	Wisma FAM, Kuala Lumpur

24 March	Cebagoo FC	1–1	Shahzan Muda FC	UMS Stadium, Sabah

24 March	Harimau Muda C	1–0	Perak YBU FC	Wisma FAM, Kuala Lumpur

24 March	Malacca FA	3–2	Tentera Darat F.A.	Hang Tuah Stadium, Malacca

24 March	PBAPP FC	3–0	PB Melayu Kedah	City Stadium, Penang

27 March	Penang FA	2–0	Tentera Darat FC	City Stadium, Penang

=== Week 8 ===
31 March	Tentera Darat F.A.	0–2	PBAPP FC	Batu Kentomen Camp, Kuala Lumpur

31 March	Perak YBU FC	2–0	Malacca FA	Perak Stadium, Perak

31 March	Shahzan Muda FC	1–2	Harimau Muda C	Temerloh Stadium, Pahang

31 March	Penang FA	1–0	Cebagoo FC	City Stadium, Penang

31 March	PB Melayu Kedah	0–4	Kuantan FA	Jitra Mini Stadium, Kedah

=== Week 9 ===
7 April	Cebagoo FC	0–0	Tumpat FA	UMS Stadium, Sabah

7 April	Malacca FA	1–0	Shahzan Muda FC	Hang Tuah Stadium, Malacca

7 April	Harimau Muda C	1–2	Penang FA	Bukit Jalil Stadium, Kuala Lumpur

7 April	PBAPP FC	1–1	Perak YBU FC	City Stadium, Penang

7 April	Kuantan FA	2–2	Tentera Darat F.A.	Darul Makmur Stadium, Pahang

=== Week 10 ===
10 April	Tumpat FA	0–1	Penang FA	Sultan Mohammad IV Stadium, Kelantan

14 April	Penang FA	1–0	Malacca FA	City Stadium, Penang

14 April	Tentera Darat F.A.	2–1	PB Melayu Kedah	Batu Kentomen Camp, Kuala Lumpur

14 April	Perak YBU FC	1–4	Kuantan FA	Perak Stadium, Perak

14 April	Shahzan Muda FC	0–1	PBAPP FC	Temerloh Stadium, Pahang
			Khairul Anas 18' (pen.)

14 April	Tumpat FA	0–4	Harimau Muda C	Sultan Mohammad IV Stadium, Kelantan

=== Week 11 ===
21 April	Harimau Muda C	1–3	Cebagoo FC	Persada PLUS Mini Stadium, Kuala Lumpur

21 April	Malacca FA	2–1	Tumpat FA	Hang Tuah Stadium, Malacca

21 April	PBAPP FC	0–1	Penang FA	City Stadium, Penang

21 April	Kuantan FA	2–2	Shahzan Muda FC	Darul Makmur Stadium, Pahang

21 April	PB Melayu Kedah	1–1	Perak YBU FC	Jitra Mini Stadium, Kedah

=== Week 12 ===
28 April	Cebagoo FC	1–1	Harimau Muda C	UMS Stadium, Sabah

28 April	Tumpat FA	2–1	Malacca FA	Sultan Mohammad IV Stadium, Kelantan

28 April	Penang FA	2–1	PBAPP FC	City Stadium, Penang

28 April	Shahzan Muda FC	2–1	Kuantan FA	Temerloh Stadium, Pahang

28 April	Perak YBU FC	1–2	PB Melayu Kedah	Perak Stadium, Perak

=== Week 13 ===
8 May	Tentera Darat F.A.	3–0	Perak YBU FC	Batu Kentomen Camp Field, Kuala Lumpur

8 May	Malacca FA	2–0	Cebagoo FC	Hang Tuah Stadium, Malacca

8 May	PBAPP FC	2–1	Tumpat FA	City Stadium, Penang

8 May	Kuantan FA	3–2	Penang FA	Darul Makmur Stadium, Pahang

8 May	PB Melayu Kedah	0–0	Shahzan Muda FC	Jitra Mini Stadium, Kedah

=== Week 14 ===
12 May	Shahzan Muda FC	3–0	Tentera Darat	Temerloh Stadium, Pahang

12 May	Penang FA	5–0	PB Melayu Kedah	City Stadium, Penang

12 May	Tumpat FA	–	Kuantan FA	Sultan Muhammad IV Stadium, Kelantan

12 May	Cebagoo FC	0–4	PBAPP FC	UMS Stadium, Sabah

12 May	Harimau Muda C	0–3	Malacca FA	PLUS Mini Stadium, Kuala Lumpur

=== Week 15 ===
19 May	Tentera Darat	2–5	Penang FA	Batu Kentomen Camp Football Field, Kuala Lumpur

19 May	Perak YBU FC	1–1	Shahzan Muda FC	Perak Stadium, Perak

19 May	PBAPP FC	1–2	Harimau Muda C	City Stadium, Penang

19 May	Kuantan FA	1–0	Cebagoo FC	Temerloh Stadium, Pahang

19 May	PB Melayu Kedah	3–3	Tumpat FA	Jitra Mini Stadium, Kedah

=== Week 16 ===
26 May	Penang FA	1–0	Perak YBU FC	City Stadium, Penang

26 May	Tumpat FA	1–2	Tentera Darat	Sultan Muhammad IV Stadium, Kelantan

26 May	Cebagoo FC	–	PB Melayu Kedah	UMS Stadium, Sabah

26 May	Harimau Muda C	1–2	Kuantan FA	Wisma FAM, Kuala Lumpur

26 May	Malacca FA	2–1	PBAPP FC	Hang Tuah Stadium, Malacca

=== Week 17 ===
2 June	PB Melayu Kedah	1–2	Harimau Muda C	Jitra Mini Stadium, Kedah

2 June	Tentera Darat	6–0	Cebagoo FC	Batu Kentomen Football Field, Kuala Lumpur

2 June	Perak YBU	0–1	Tumpat FA	Perak Stadium, Perak

2 June	Kuantan FA	4–2	Malacca FA	Darul Makmur Stadium, Pahang

2 June	Shahzan Muda FC	0–1	Penang FA	Temerloh Stadium, Pahang

=== Week 18 ===
9 June	Cebagoo FC	3–3	Perak YBU FC	UMS Stadium, Sabah

9 June	Harimau Muda C	0–1	Tentera Darat	Wisma FAM, Kuala Lumpur

9 June	Malacca FA	3–2	PB Melayu Kedah	Hang Tuah Stadium, Malacca

9 June	PBAPP	1–2	Kuantan FA	City Stadium, Penang

9 June	Tumpat FA	0–1	Shahzan Muda FC	Sultan Muhammad IV Stadium, Kelantan

=== Week 19 ===
16 June	Tentera Darat	4–1	Malacca FA	Batu Kentomen Football Field, Kuala Lumpur

16 June	Penang FA	2–0	Tumpat FA	City Stadium, Penang

16 June	PB Melayu Kedah	0–7	PBAPP FC	Jitra Mini Stadium, Kedah

16 June	Perak YBU FC	1–2	Harimau Muda C	Perak Stadium, Perak

16 June	Shahzan Muda FC	1–1	Cebagoo FC	Temerloh Mini Stadium, Pahang

=== Week 20 ===
23 June	Cebagoo FC	1–7	Penang FA	Penampang Stadium, Sabah
16:15 UTC+08:00	Arif Awang 6'		Mohd Syafuan 30', 79'; Norizam Salaman 43', 45', 76'; Mohd Bashier 58'; Khairul Anwar 84'

23 June	Harimau Muda C	3–0	Shahzan Muda FC	PLUS Stadium, Kuala Lumpur
16:45 UTC+08:00

23 June	Malacca FA	2–1	Perak YBU FC	Hang Tuah Stadium, Malacca
16:45 UTC+08:00

23 June	PBAPP FC	2–0	Tentera Darat	City Stadium, Penang
16:45 UTC+08:00

23 June	Kuantan FA	1–2	PB Melayu Kedah	Darul Makmur Stadium, Pahang
20:45 UTC+08:00

=== Week 21 ===
30 June	Penang FA	2–2	Harimau Muda C	City Stadium, Penang
16:15 UTC+08:00

=== Week 22 ===
5 July	Malacca FA	3–2	Penang FA	Hang Tuah Stadium, Malacca

5 July	Harimau Muda C	3–0	Tumpat FA	Wisma FAM, Kuala Lumpur

5 July	PBAPP FC	4–0	Shahzan Muda FC	City Stadium, Penang

5 July	Kuantan FA	3–2	Perak YBU FC	Darul Makmur Stadium, Pahang

5 July	PB Melayu Kedah	1–8	Tentera Darat	Jitra Mini Stadium, Kedah

== Fixtures and results ==
Home \ Away	CEB	HMC	KUA	MLC	PBMK	PBA	PEN	YBU	SMFC	TDM	TUM
Cebagoo		1–1	0–1	2–0	3–0	0–4	1–7	3–3	1–1	2–3	0–0
Harimau Muda	3–1		1–2	0–3	0–0	2–3	1–2	2–1	3–0	0–1	3–0
Kuantan FA	1–0	1–1		4–2	1–2	1–2	3–2	3–2	2–2	2–2	3–3
Malacca	2–0	0–2	1–1		3–2	2–1	3–2	2–1	1–0	3–2	2–1
PBMK	0–3	1–2	0–4	1–2		0–7	2–7	1–1	0–0	1–8	3–3
PBAPP FC	1–0	1–2	1–2	1–1	3–0		0–1	1–1	4–0	2–0	2–1
Penang	1–0	2–2	3–0	1–0	5–0	2–1		1–0	3–1	2–0	2–0
Perak YBU	0–2	1–2	1–4	2–0	1–2	0–2	2–3		1–1	1–3	0–1
Shahzan	1–1	1–2	2–1	1–1	1–2	0–1	0–1	0–3		0–3	1–2
Tentera Darat	6–0	4–4	1–0	4–1	2–1	0–2	2–5	3–0	0–1		4–2
Tumpat	0–0	0–4	0–3	2–1	1–2	0–1	0–1	1–0	0–1	1–2	

Updated to match(es) played on 5 July 2013. Source: fam.org.my
Legend: Blue = home team win; Yellow = draw; Red = away team win.

== Champions ==
=== Records ===
- Largest winning margin: 7 goals
  - PB Melayu Kedah 0–7 PBAPP (16 June 2013)
- Highest scoring game: 9 goals
  - PB Melayu Kedah 2–7 Penang (6 March 2013)
- Most goals scored in a match by a single team: 7 goals
  - PB Melayu Kedah 2–7 Penang (6 March 2013)
- Most goals scored in a match by a losing team: 2 goals
  - Perak YBU 2–3 Penang (3 March 2013)
  - Tentera Darat 4–2 Tumpat (3 March 2013)
  - PB Melayu Kedah 2–7 Penang (6 March 2013)
  - Cebagoo FC 2–3 Tentera Darat (10 March 2013)
  - Harimau Muda C 2–3 PBAPP FC (20 March 2013)
  - Melaka 3–2 Tentera Darat (24 March 2013)
  - Kuantan FA 3–2 Penang (8 May 2013)
  - Tentera Darat 2–5 Penang (19 May 2013)
- Most clean sheets: 10
  - Penang

== Champions ==
2013 Malaysia FAM League winner
Penang FA

== See also ==
- 2013 Malaysia Super League
- 2013 Malaysia Premier League
- 2013 Malaysia FA Cup
