= List of football clubs in Malaysia =

This is a list of football clubs located in Malaysia and the leagues and divisions they play in.

== Professional league (Malaysian League) ==
The professional league is managed by Malaysian Football League.

=== Malaysia Super League ===
2025–26 season

| Team | Location | Stadium | Capacity |
|---|---|---|---|
| (Brunei) DPMM | Bandar Seri Begawan | Hassanal Bolkiah National Stadium | 28,000 |
| (Putrajaya) Immigration | Batu Kawan | Penang State Stadium | 40,000 |
| Johor Darul Ta'zim | Iskandar Puteri | Sultan Ibrahim Stadium | 40,000 |
| Kelantan The Real Warriors | Kota Bharu | Sultan Muhammad IV Stadium | 22,000 |
| Kuala Lumpur City | Cheras | Kuala Lumpur Stadium | 18,000 |
| (Sarawak) Kuching City | Kuching | Sarawak State Stadium | 26,000 |
| (Malacca) Melaka | Krubong | Hang Jebat Stadium | 40,000 |
| Negeri Sembilan | Seremban | Tuanku Abdul Rahman Stadium | 45,000 |
| (Malaysia) PDRM | Selayang | Selayang Stadium | 16,000 |
| Penang | George Town | City Stadium | 20,000 |
| Sabah | Kota Kinabalu | Likas Stadium | 35,000 |
| Selangor | Petaling Jaya | Petaling Jaya Stadium | 10,661 |
| Terengganu | Kuala Nerus | Sultan Mizan Zainal Abidin Stadium | 50,000 |

== Semi-professional league ==
=== Malaysia A1 Semi-Pro League ===
2025–26 season

| Team | Location | Stadium | Capacity |
|---|---|---|---|
| Armed Forces | Kampung Datuk Keramat | Mindef Stadium | 5,000 |
| (Negeri Sembilan) Bunga Raya | Bandar Sri Sendayan | Arena IRC Negeri Sembilan | 1,000 |
| (Putrajaya) Immigration II | Serdang | UPM Stadium | 3,000 |
| Johor Darul Ta'zim II | Pasir Gudang | Pasir Gudang Corporation Stadium | 15,000 |
| Kedah Darul Aman | Jitra | MPKP Mini Stadium | 5,000 |
| Kedah FA | Alor Setar | Darul Aman Stadium | 32,387 |
| Kelantan Red Warrior | Kota Bharu | Sultan Muhammad IV Stadium | 22,000 |
| Kelantan WTS | Kota Bharu | Sultan Muhammad IV Stadium | 22,000 |
| (Sarawak) Machan | Melaka City | Hang Tuah Stadium | 1,000 |
| (Malaysia) Malaysian University | Nilai | USIM Stadium | 1,000 |
| (Perak) Manjung City | Seri Manjung | Manjung Municipal Council Stadium | 15,000 |
| Perak FA | Chemor | Chepor SSI Mini Stadium, Perak Football Complex | 1,000 |
| Perlis GSA | Kangar | Tuanku Syed Putra Stadium | 20,000 |
| Selangor II | Petaling Jaya | Petaling Jaya Stadium | 25,000 |
| (South Korea) Seoul Phoenix | Cyberjaya | MMU Stadium | 2,500 |
| (Selangor) UM-Damansara United | Kuala Lumpur | UM Arena Stadium | 1,500 |

== Amateur league ==
=== Malaysia A2 Amateur League ===
2025–26 season

| Team | Location | Stadium | Capacity |
|---|---|---|---|
| (Selangor) AAK Puncak Alam | Puncak Alam | Kuala Selangor Stadium, Kuala Selangor | 10,000 |
| (Putrajaya) ACeIO | Putrajaya | | |
| (Kelantan) AZM Rovers | Kota Bharu | | |
| (Perlis) Bintong | Bintong | | |
| (Malacca) Duyong Fighters | Duyong | | |
| (Kuala Lumpur) Kampong Ku | Kampung Baru, Kuala Lumpur | Jalan Raja Muda Abdul Aziz Mini Stadium | 3,500 |
| (Kuala Lumpur) KL Rangers | Setiawangsa | Setiawangsa Stadium | 1,000 |
| Kuala Lumpur Rovers | Kuala Lumpur | Kuala Lumpur Stadium | 18,000 |
| (Kedah) Kuala Muda | Kuala Muda | Sungai Petani Municipal Council Sports Complex | 2,500 |
| Kuala Perlis Titans | Kuala Perlis | | |
| (Pahang) Kuantan City | Kuantan | | |
| (Kedah) Kubang Pasu | Kubang Pasu | | |
| (Malacca) MBMB Warriors | Malacca City | Hang Tuah Stadium | 1,000 |
| (Negeri Sembilan) NS Forces Warriors | Port Dickson | | |
| (Negeri Sembilan) PUSEN Hornet | Bandar Sri Sendayan | | |
| (Pahang) Raub | Raub, Pahang | | |
| (Selangor) Sungai Merab | Sepang | | |
| (Negeri Sembilan) Teck Hin | Seremban | | |
| (Selangor) UiTM United | Shah Alam | UiTM Stadium | 10,000 |
| (Penang) USM | Gelugor | USM Stadium | 1,000 |
| (Pahang) YPM | Kuantan | Darul Makmur Stadium | 40,000 |

=== Malaysia A3 Community League ===
2025–26 season

==== A Ligue Champions League ====
- Alti Genius
- Arslan
- Asawa
- Bawean City
- Budak Baru Nak Up
- Carabat
- Catalans Empire
- Damansara Bulls
- Gemilang
- HE Clinic
- Klang Valley Comrade
- Kuala Lumpur Passion
- Loyal Troopers
- Masjid Bandar Tun Hussein Onn
- Nadi Sepang
- Neo X
- Obi & Friends
- OSV UK
- Perakan Nilai
- Puncak Alam United
- Rantau KL
- Scarecrow
- Shah Alam Antlers
- Sri Ampang Bootboys Club
- Young Falcons

==== Pahang Amateur League ====
- Aby55 Jengka
- Bentong City
- Darul Makmur United
- Doesata United
- FC Jerantut
- GCMA
- Gelanggi
- Gelora Old Boys
- Heero Academy
- MFT
- Pasir Sia
- Pulau Tawar
- Real Kuantan
- RFX United
- Sebertak
- Seri Bukit
- Siantan
- Sri Tonkin
- STW Jelai
- Temerloh Jaya Rovers
- Twentyfour
- Wagga Temerloh

==== Perlis Super League ====
- Anak Nelayan Kuala Perlis
- Anas Sanglang
- Arau City
- Bintong FC II
- Juang Titans Kangar
- KSMR Kangar Unity-Singa Muda
- Stormz Padang Besar

== Former team ==
- Brunei
- (Johor) MBJB FC
- Johor Bahru
- (Johor) Melodi Jaya Sports Club
- (Johor) MP Muar FC
- (Johor) Pasir Gudang United F.C.
- (Johor) SAJ FC
- (Kedah) F.C. Langkawi
- JKR Kedah F.C.
- Kedah United F.C.
- (Kedah) Kuala Muda Naza FC
- (Kedah) Langkawi City F.C.
- JKR Kelantan F.C.
- JPS Kelantan F.C.
- Kelantan F.C.
- (Kelantan) Kijang Rangers F.C.
- SKMK Kelantan F.C.
- TNB Kelantan F.C.
- (Kelantan) Tumpat F.A.
- (Kelantan) Tok Janggut Warriors
- (Kuala Lumpur) DBKL
- (Kuala Lumpur) DRB Hicom
- (Kuala Lumpur) FELCRA F.C.
- (Kuala Lumpur) FELDA United
- (Kuala Lumpur) IKRAM Muda
- (Kuala Lumpur) KL Kesas FC
- (Kuala Lumpur) KL Malay Mail F.C.
- Kuala Lumpur Maju United FC
- (Kuala Lumpur) Protap
- (Kuala Lumpur) Rapid KL FC
- (Kuala Lumpur) Semarak
- (Kuala Lumpur) Sime Darby F.C.
- (Kuala Lumpur) Tentera Darat F.A.
- (Kuala Lumpur) Tun Razak F.C.
- (Kuala Lumpur) Young Fighters F.C.
- (Malaysia) Harimau Muda A (2008–09, 2011)
- (Malaysia) Harimau Muda B
- (Malaysia) Harimau Muda C
- (Malacca) KOR RAMD F.C.
- (Malacca) Telekom Malaysia F.C. (1994–2007)
- (Malacca) Melaka United
- (Malacca) Melaka City F.C.
- (Negeri Sembilan) NS Betaria FC
- (Negeri Sembilan) NS Chempaka F.C.
- (Negeri Sembilan) SAINS
- (Pahang) D'AR Wanderers
- (Pahang) Kuantan FA
- (Pahang) Marcerra United
- Sri Pahang FC
- (Pahang) Shahzan Muda
- (Penang) PBAPP F.C.
- (Penang) PP Kampung Seronok FC
- (Penang) Sinar Dimaja Mai Sarah FC
- (Penang) Sungai Ara F.C.
- (Penang) Suria NTFA
- (Penang) USM FC
- (Perak) BRM FC
- TKN Perak FC
- (Perak) UPB MyTeam
- (Perak) YBU F.C.
- (Perak) Ipoh F.A.
- Perak FC
- (Perak) Respect
- (Perlis) Northern Lions
- Perlis
- Perlis United
- (Putrajaya) MOF F.C.
- Putrajaya SPA F.C.
- (Sabah) Baverly F.C.
- (Sabah) Cebagoo F.C.
- (Sabah) DYS F.C.
- (Sabah) KDMM F.C.
- (Sabah) Kinabalu Jaguar
- Sarawak
- Sarawak United
- (Selangor) Juara Ban Hoe Leong FC
- MPPJ Selangor F.C.
- (Selangor) Klasiko
- (Selangor) Megah Murni F.C.
- (Selangor) Melawati
- (Selangor) MK Land F.C.
- (Selangor) MPSJ F.C.
- (Selangor) Penjara
- (Selangor) Petaling Jaya City
- (Selangor) Petaling Jaya Rangers
- (Selangor) PLUS FC
- (Selangor) Proton FC
- (Selangor) Public Bank F.C. (2003–06)
- (Selangor) Real Mulia F.C.
- (Selangor) SUKSES FC
- Thai Selangor
- (Selangor) TUDM Hornet F.C.
- (Selangor) UKM
- (Singapore) LionsXII
- Singapore FA
- (Terengganu) Hanelang F.C.
- Kuala Terengganu Rovers
- Terengganu City F.C.
