= Dominic Tan =

Footballer (born 1997)

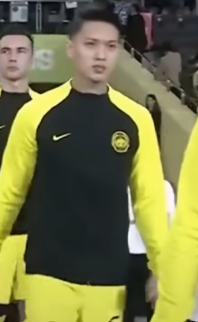
- Dominic playing Malaysia for in 2023

Personal information
- Full name: Dominic Tan Jun Jin
- Date of birth: 12 March 1997 (age 29)
- Place of birth: Singapore
- Height: 1.83 m (6 ft 0 in)
- Position: Centre-back

Team information
- Current team: Sabah

Youth career
- 2010–2013: Singapore Sports School

Senior career*
Years	Team	Apps	(Gls)
2014–2015	Harimau Muda C	15	(0)
2016–2019	Johor Darul Ta'zim II	26	(0)
2016–2018	Johor Darul Ta'zim	4	(0)
2018	→ Vilaverdense (loan)	1	(0)
2019	→ Police Tero (loan)	1	(0)
2019	→ Police Tero B (loan)	2	(0)
2020–2021	Police Tero	22	(0)
2022–	Sabah	130	(5)

International career^{‡}
2014–2016	Malaysia U19	20	(0)
2016–2019	Malaysia U23	19	(0)
2019–	Malaysia	39	(0)
- * Club domestic league appearances and goals as of 27 September 2025 ‡ National team caps and goals as of 17 November 2026

Dominic Tan Jun Jin (simplified Chinese: 陈俊仁; traditional Chinese: 陳俊仁; pinyin: Chén Jùnrén; born 12 March 1997) is a professional footballer who plays as a centre-back for Malaysia Super League club Sabah FC. Born in Singapore, he represents the Malaysia national team.

== Early life and education ==
Tan was born in Singapore to Malaysian Chinese parents that moved from Penang to Singapore for work. He was also in the National Football Academy (NFA). Tan also studied at the Singapore Sports School.

== Club career ==
=== Harimau Muda C ===
Tan began his senior career playing in Malaysia, representing Harimau Muda C in the FAM League.

=== Johor Darul Ta'zim ===
In 2016, Tan signed with Johor Darul Ta'zim. He played with the second team in the Malaysia Premier League and then promoted to the main squad of for the Malaysia Super League and Malaysia Cup. He made his debut in a 3–0 away defeat against Perak in the 2018 Malaysia Cup.

==== Vilaverdense (loan) ====
On 25 January 2018, Johor Darul Ta'zim have confirmed that Tan will leave for Portuguese third division club Vilaverdense on 27 January 2018 for a year-long loan stint. In early May, it was confirmed that Tan would return to Johor six months early alongside teammate Syamer Kutty Abba.

==== Police Tero (loan) ====
In 2019, Tan joined Police Tero that plays in Thai League 2 on loan from Johor Darul Ta'zim. He made his first appearances with Police Tero B team in a match against Air Force United B in the 2019 Thai League 4. He made his debut in the 2019 Thai League 1 with Police Tero first team coming in as a substitute in the last minute against Air Force United.

=== Police Tero ===
During the 2020 season, Tan signed a two-year contract with Police Tero.

=== Sabah ===
In 2022, Tan joined Sabah that plays in Malaysia Super League. He made his debut in the opening match of 2022 Malaysia Super League against Negeri Sembilan at the Likas Stadium. On 1 September 2022, Tan scored his first goal for Sabah in a 2–2 draw against Kuala Lumpur, which also his first goal in the first division of Malaysian League.

== International career ==
Tan previously represented the youth team of the Singapore national football team while living in Singapore as a permanent resident.

In 2016, Tan was called up for the Malaysia national under-22 team for the inaugural Nations Cup. Later in August, he made his first start in a friendly match against Bahrain, with the match ending in a 0–0 draw. In 2017, he was selected for the Dubai Cup Football Tournament.

In 2018, Tan played for the national under-23 team in the 2018 AFC U-23 Championship and 2018 Asian Games which Malaysia qualify into the knockout round. In June 2019, he made his Malaysia senior debut in a friendly match against Nepal. Tan also represented the nation at the 2023 AFC Asian Cup, and was part of the first eleven during the group stage match where Malaysia tied Korea 3-3.

== Career statistics ==
=== Club ===
As of 11 January 2025

Appearances and goals by club, season and competition.
Club performance			League		Cup (Note: Appearances in Malaysia FA Cup and Thailand FA Cup)		League Cup (Note: Appearances in Malaysia Cup, Malaysia Challenge Cup and Thai League Cup)		Continental (Note: Appearances in AFC Champions League and AFC Cup)		Total	
Club	Season	League	Apps	Goals	Apps	Goals	Apps	Goals	Apps	Goals	Apps	Goals
Harimau Muda C	2014	Malaysia FAM League			0	0	–					
Harimau Muda C	2015	Malaysia FAM League			1	0	–					
Total					1	0	–		–			
Johor Darul Ta'zim II	2016	Malaysia Premier League	12	0	1	0	–		–		13	0
Total			12	0	1	0	–		–		13	0
Johor Darul Ta'zim	2016	Malaysia Super League	0	0	–		3	0	–		3	0
Johor Darul Ta'zim	2017	Malaysia Super League	1	0	0	0	–		3	0	4	0
Johor Darul Ta'zim	2018	Malaysia Super League	0	0	–						0	0
Total			1	0	0	0	3	0	3	0	7	0
Vilaverdense (loan)	2017–18	Campeonato de Portugal	1	0	–						1	0
Total			1	0	–						1	0
Johor Darul Ta'zim II	2018	Malaysia Premier League	6	0	–		1	0	–		7	0
Johor Darul Ta'zim II	2019	Malaysia Premier League	8	0	0	0	0	0	–		8	0
Total			14	0	0	0	1	0	0	0	15	0
Police Tero B (loan)	2019	Thai League 4	2	0	–						2	0
Police Tero (loan)	2019	Thai League 2	1	0	–						1	0
Police Tero	2020	Thai League 1	15	0	–						15	0
Police Tero	2021-22	Thai League 1	6	0	–						6	0
Total			24	0	–						24	0
Sabah	2022	Malaysia Super League	21	2	2	0	6	0	–		29	2
Sabah	2023	Malaysia Super League	22	1	2	0	0	0	7	0	31	1
Sabah	2024–25	Malaysia Super League	16	1	3	0	0	0	–		19	1
Total			59	4	7	0	6	0	7	0	69	4
Career total			111	4	9	0	10	0	10	0	140	4

=== International ===
As of 26 March 2024

Appearances and goals by national team and year
National team	Year	Apps	Goals
Malaysia	2019	2	0
Malaysia	2021	5	0
Malaysia	2022	7	0
Malaysia	2023	6	0
Malaysia	2024	8	0
Total		28	0

== Honours ==
Johor Darul Ta'zim

- Malaysia Super League: 2016, 2017
- Malaysia Cup: 2017

Malaysia

- King's Cup runner-up: 2022
- Pestabola Merdeka: 2024
