= 2016 Malaysia FAM Cup =

Malaysia FAM Cup
- Season: 2016
- Champions: MISC-MIFA
- Promoted: MISC-MIFA, PKNP F.C.
- Matches: 136
- Goals: 315 (2.32 per match)
- Biggest home win: MOF 5–0 MPKB (22 May 2016)
- Biggest away win: PBMM 0–5 PKNP (9 March 2016)
- Highest scoring: MISC-MIFA 6–3 DYS (10 April 2016)
- All statistics correct as of 17 April 2016.

The 2016 Malaysia FAM Cup (referred to as the FAM Cup or FAM League) is the 65th season of the Malaysia FAM League since its establishment in 1952. The league is currently the third level football league in Malaysia. Melaka United are the previous champion and currently play in the second level of Malaysian football, Malaysia Premier League. For 2016 season, there are 18 teams will compete in the league where 11 teams are from last season while 7 new teams entered the competition.

== Season changes ==
The following teams have changed division since the 2015 season.

=== To Malaysia FAM Cup ===
New Team

- (Sabah) DYS F.C.
- (Sabah) KDMM F.C.
- (Kelantan) MPKB-BRI U-Bes F.C.
- (Kuala Lumpur) PB Melayu Malaysia
- (Perak) PKNP F.C.
- (Malacca) SAMB FC

=== From Malaysia FAM Cup ===
Promoted to Premier League

- Perlis FA
- (Malacca) Melaka United

Relocated to President's Cup

- Johor Darul Ta'zim III F.C.

Teams withdrawn

- (Malaysia) Harimau Muda C
- Putrajaya SPA F.C. (Relegated from 2015 Malaysia Premier League)
- Kedah United
- (Kuala Lumpur) Real Mulia F.C.
- (Penang) PBAPP F.C.
- (Kuala Lumpur) TNB Kilat F.C. (New team)
- (Kuala Lumpur) Young Fighters F.C.

== Teams ==
Participation approved by FAM :-

- (Selangor) AirAsia Allstars F.C.
- (Sabah) DYS F.C.
- (Kuala Lumpur) FELCRA F.C.
- (Terengganu) Hanelang F.C.
- (Perak) Ipoh F.A.
- (Sabah) KDMM F.C.
- (Selangor) Megah Murni F.C.
- (Malaysia) MISC-MIFA
- (Putrajaya) MOF F.C.
- (Kelantan) MPKB-BRI U-Bes F.C.
- (Kuala Lumpur) PB Melayu Malaysia
- Penjara F.C.
- (Perak) PKNP F.C.
- (Malacca) SAMB FC
- (Pahang) Shahzan Muda F.C.
- (Penang) Sungai Ara F.C.
- (Kuala Lumpur) UKM F.C.

== Team summaries ==
=== Stadium and locations ===
Team	States	Home Ground
AirAsia	Selangor	Shah Alam Stadium, Shah Alam
DYS	Sabah	Tawau Stadium, Tawau
FELCRA	Kuala Lumpur	UM Arena Stadium, Kuala Lumpur
Hanelang	Terengganu	Astaka Kuala Berang Field, Kuala Berang
PB Ipoh	Perak	Manjung Mini Stadium, Manjung
KDMM	Sabah	Keningau Stadium, Keningau
MPKB-BRI	Kelantan	Sultan Muhammad IV Stadium, Kota Bharu
Megah Murni	Selangor	BSN Sport Complex Field, Bangi
MISC-MIFA	—	USIM Stadium, Nilai
MOF FC	Kuala Lumpur	INSPENS Stadium, Putrajaya
PB Melayu Malaysia	Kuala Lumpur	UKM Bangi Stadium, Bangi
Penjara	Negeri Sembilan	Tampin Mini Stadium, Tampin
PKNP	Perak	Perak Stadium, Ipoh
SAMB	Malacca	Hang Tuah Stadium, Malacca City
Shahzan Muda	Pahang	Darul Makmur Stadium, Kuantan
Sungai Ara	Penang	Bandaraya Stadium, George Town
UKM	Kuala Lumpur	UKM Bangi Stadium, Bangi

=== Personnel and kits ===
Note: Flags indicate national team as has been defined under FIFA eligibility rules. Players and Managers may hold more than one non-FIFA nationality.

Team	Coach	Captain	Kit Manufacturer	Shirt Sponsor
AirAsia FC	(Malaysia) P. Maniam	(Malaysia) Muhd Hazwan Abdul Rahman	Line 7	AirAsia
DYS FC	(Malaysia) Stanley Chew	(Malaysia) Mohd Reithaudin Awang Emran	Carino	
FELCRA FC	(Malaysia) Yusri Che Lah	(Malaysia) Shahrulnizam Mustapa	Kika	FELCRA
Hanelang	(Malaysia) Abdul Rahim Ahmad	(Malaysia) Mohd Khairul Rosmadi	Mizuno	Transformasi Terengganu Baharu
Ipoh FA	(Malaysia) Pugelenthi a/l Arunasalam	(Malaysia) Khairool Anas Safri	Al-Ikhsan	Al-Ikhsan
KDMM FC	(Malaysia) Andrew Majanggim	(Malaysia) Redzuan Mohd Radzy	Carino	Carino
MPKB-BRI	(Malaysia) Abdullah Muhammad	(Malaysia) Somchai Sinuai	Eureka	U-BeS, SH Prima & Minyak Mestika
Megah Murni FC	(Malaysia) R. Nallathamby	(Malaysia) Mohd Rushdi Addrus	Line 7	Megah Murni
PB Melayu Malaysia	(Malaysia) Mohd Ali Khan Abdullah	(Malaysia) Azuan Izam	Line 7	
MISC-MIFA	(Malaysia) Jacob Joseph	(Malaysia) K. Nanthakumar	Umbro	MIFA
MOF FC	(Malaysia) Zahasmi Ismail	(Malaysia) Mohd Nizad Ayub	Puma	MSC Malaysia
Penjara FC	(Malaysia) Abdul Rahim Abdullah	(Malaysia) Rendie Acho	Pride Wave	
PKNP FC	(Malaysia) Abu Bakar Fadzim	(Malaysia) Mohd Fazli Zulkifli	Nike	PKNP
SAMB FC	(Malaysia) Remeli Junit	(Malaysia) Mohd Azizan Baba	Kronos	SAMB
Shahzan Muda SC	(Malaysia) Tajuddin Nor	(Malaysia) Wan Muhammad Idham Wan Sulaiman	Macron	
Sungai Ara FC	(Malaysia) Azhar Abdul Rahman	(Malaysia) Zainuddin Abidin	Line 7	Best Greenworld
UKM FC	(Malaysia) Lim Kim Lian	(Malaysia) Mohd Hafizuddin Sulaiman	Ultron	Soaring Upwards

=== Coaching changes ===
Team	Outgoing Head Coach	Manner of departure	Date of vacancy	Incoming Head Coach	Date of appointment
AirAsia F.C.	(Malaysia) Mohd Nidzam Jamil	End of contract	28 March 2016	(Malaysia) P. Maniam	30 March 2016

== Results ==
=== Group A ===
==== League table ====
Pos	Team	Pld	W	D	L	GF	GA	GD	Pts	Promotion or qualification
1	MISC-MIFA (C, P)	16	11	3	2	31	12	+19	36	Advance to knock-out stage
2	FELCRA	16	10	3	3	19	7	+12	33	Advance to knock-out stage
3	AirAsia Allstar	16	8	6	2	19	7	+12	30	Advance to knock-out stage
4	Sungai Ara	16	9	2	5	20	14	+6	29	Advance to knock-out stage & Withdrew from FAM League
5	Shahzan Muda	16	7	4	5	23	16	+7	25	
6	Penjara	16	2	7	7	13	23	−10	13	
7	Megah Murni	16	3	4	9	13	26	−13	13	Withdrew from FAM League
8	Ipoh	16	3	2	11	16	32	−16	11	Withdrew from FAM League
9	DYS F.C.	16	2	3	11	12	28	−16	9	Withdrew from FAM League

Source: FAM Official Site
Rules for classification: 1) Points; 2) Goal difference; 3) Number of goals scored
(C) Champions; (P) Promoted

==== Result table ====
Home \ Away	AAS	DYS	FCR	IPO	MMU	MIF	PJR	SMU	SGA
AirAsia		1–0	1–1	1–0	0–0	0–0	2–1	2–0	1–2
DYS	0–2		1–2	1–2	1–2	0–1	0–0	1–2	1–3
Felcra	1–0	1–1		2–0	3–0	2–2	2–0	1–0	0–1
Ipoh	0–3	0–2	2–3		2–2	0–3	2–2	2–0	0–1
Megah Murni	1–1	0–1	0–1	3–2		0–1	1–1	1–4	0–3
MISC-MIFA	0–1	6–3	1–0	2–0	2–0		3–1	1–1	3–0
Penjara	0–2	0–0	1–3	1–2	2–1	2–1		1–1	0–1
Shahzan Muda	1–1	3–0	2–0	4–1	1–0	1–2	1–1		0–2
Sungai Ara	0–0	2–0	0–2	2–1	1–2	1–3	0–0	0–2	

Updated to match(es) played on unknown. Source:
Legend: Blue = home team win; Yellow = draw; Red = away team win.

=== Group B ===
==== League table ====
Pos	Team	Pld	W	D	L	GF	GA	GD	Pts	Promotion or qualification
1	PKNP (P)	14	9	3	2	26	9	+17	30	Advance to knock-out stage
2	MOF	14	8	3	3	25	12	+13	27	Advance to knock-out stage
3	SAMB	14	8	3	3	21	14	+7	27	Advance to knock-out stage
4	KDMM	14	5	4	5	11	14	−3	19	Advance to knock-out stage
5	UKM	14	4	4	6	13	16	−3	16	
6	Hanelang	14	3	4	7	12	19	−7	13	
7	PB Melayu Malaysia	14	3	3	8	12	25	−13	12	
8	MPKB-BRI U-Bes	14	2	4	8	12	23	−11	10	
9	TNB Kilat	0	0	0	0	0	0	0	0	Withdraw

Source: FAM Official Site
Rules for classification: 1) Points; 2) Goal difference; 3) Number of goals scored
(P) Promoted

==== Result table ====
Home \ Away	HAN	KDM	MBU	MOF	PBM	PKP	SAM	UKM
Hanelang		0–1	1–1	1–0	1–1	0–1	1–0	1–0
KDMM	1–0		2–0	2–2	1–3	0–0	1–3	0–0
MPKB	3–3	0–1		0–1	3–0	1–1	0–1	2–1
MOF	2–2	1–0	5–0		3–0	1–0	2–0	1–2
PBMM	2–1	0–1	1–0	0–2		0–5	1–2	1–1
PKNP	4–0	2–1	2–1	3–1	3–2		1–1	1–0
SAMB	1–0	0–0	3–1	2–3	1–1	1–0		3–1
UKM	2–1	3–0	0–0	0–0	1–0	0–3	2–3	

Updated to match(es) played on unknown. Source: Malaysia FAM League
Legend: Blue = home team win; Yellow = draw; Red = away team win.

== Knock-out stage ==
=== Bracket ===
Quarter-finals
(Sabah) KDMM	1	2	3
(Malaysia) MISC-MIFA	4	1	5
(Selangor) AirAsia	1	1	2
(Kuala Lumpur) MOF	0	1	1
(Penang) Sungai Ara	0	1	1
(Perak) PKNP	3	3	6
(Malacca) SAMB	0	1	1
(Kuala Lumpur) Felcra	1	2	3

Semi-finals
(Malaysia) MISC-MIFA	1	1	2
(Selangor) AirAsia	1	0	1
(Perak) PKNP	0	3	3
(Kuala Lumpur) Felcra	0	2	2

Final
(Malaysia) MISC-MIFA	1	2	3
(Perak) PKNP	0	1	1

=== Quarter-finals ===
==== First leg ====
7 September 2016	(Sabah) KDMM	1 - 4	(Malaysia) MISC-MIFA	Keningau Stadium
20:15 (UTC+8)	Mohd Helmi Sudin 25'		Muhammad Fauzi Abdul Kadar 41' 62'; M. Yoges 73'; M. Thinnadkaran 81'	Attendance: 997; Referee: Ismail Asib Md Amin

7 September 2016	(Selangor) AirAsia	1 - 0	(Kuala Lumpur) MOF	Shah Alam Stadium
16:45 (UTC+8)	Shahril Izwan Abdullah 29'			Attendance: 200; Referee: Muhammad Zamzaidi Katimin

7 September 2016	(Penang) Sungai Ara	0 - 3	(Perak) PKNP	City Stadium, Penang
20:45 (UTC+8)			Shahrel Fikri Fauzi 16'; G. Mugenthirran 27' (pen.), 33'	Attendance: 300; Referee: Mohd Ezanee Mohd Said

7 September 2016	(Malacca) SAMB	0 - 1	(Kuala Lumpur) Felcra	Hang Tuah Stadium
20:45 (UTC+8)			Mohd Fazliata Taib 45+3'	Attendance: 1500; Referee: Mohammad Nasrudin Tamrin

==== Second leg ====
18 September 2016	(Malaysia) MISC-MIFA	1 - 2	(Sabah) KDMM	USIM Mini Stadium
16:15 (UTC+8)	Muhammad Fauzi Abdul Kadar 65'		Zuraideybin Junai 21'; Hardy Charles Parsi 33'	Attendance: 200; Referee: Teoh Hee Loon

18 September 2016	(Kuala Lumpur) MOF	1 - 1	(Selangor) AirAsia	INSPEN Stadium
20:45 (UTC+8)	Rezal Zambery Yahya 74'		Muhamad Zamri Hassan 41'	Attendance: 400; Referee: Fitri Maskon

18 September 2016	(Perak) PKNP	3 - 1	(Penang) Sungai Ara	Perak Stadium
20:45 (UTC+8)	S. Deevan Raj 40', 45'; Hamizul Izaidi Zulkifli 51'		Mohamad Zailani 63'	Attendance: 700; Referee: Suresh Jayaraman

18 September 2016	(Kuala Lumpur) Felcra	2 - 1	(Malacca) SAMB	UM Arena Stadium
20:45 (UTC+8)	Mohd Faiz Mohd Nasir 31'; Muhammad Hafizi Mat Podzi 63'		Mohd Zaidi Zubir 70'	Attendance: 300; Referee: Muhd Rahmat Jantan

=== Semi-finals ===
==== First leg ====
25 September 2016	(Malaysia) MISC-MIFA	1 - 1	(Selangor) AirAsia	USIM Mini Stadium, Nilai
16:45 (UTC+8)	G.Thipen Raj 80'	Report	Khyril Muhymeen Zambri 45+1'	Attendance: 800; Referee: Saiful Bin Mohd Rodzali

25 September 2016	(Perak) PKNP	0 - 0	(Kuala Lumpur) Felcra	Perak Stadium, Ipoh
20:45 (UTC+8)		Report		Attendance: 4500 ++ Referee: Mohd Hasrul Bin Mohd Amir

==== Second leg ====
9 October 2016	(Selangor) AirAsia	0 - 1	(Malaysia) MISC-MIFA	Shah Alam Stadium
16:15 (UTC+8)		Report	M. Sathish 69'	Attendance: 400; Referee: Ismail Asib Md Amin

9 October 2016	(Kuala Lumpur) Felcra	2 - 3	(Perak) PKNP	UM Arena Stadium, Kuala Lumpur
20:45 (UTC+8)	Mohd Fadzli Saari 24'; Mohd Syafiq Azmi 60'	Report	Hamizul Izaidi Zulkifli 47'; G. Mugenthirran 57', 85'	Attendance: 3221; Referee: Samsudin Bin Ibrahim

=== Final ===
==== First leg ====
20 October 2016
20:45 (UTC+8)

(Malaysia) MISC-MIFA	1 - 0	(Perak) PKNP
G. Thipen Raj 89' (pen.)	Report

Shah Alam Stadium
Attendance: 6700
Referee: Mohd Ezanee Mohd Said

==== Second leg ====
27 October 2016
20:45 (UTC+8)

(Perak) PKNP	1 - 2	(Malaysia) MISC-MIFA
Mazni Hasnan 73'	Report	Yoges Muniandy 5'; Munawwar Ali 67'

Perak Stadium, Ipoh
Attendance: 7000
Referee: Fitri Maskon

== Champions ==
Champions

1st title

== Statistics ==
=== Scorers ===
==== Top scorers ====
As of matches played on 11 April 2016.

#	Player	Club	±
1	(Malaysia) Nizad Ayub	MOF	6
1	(Malaysia) Khyril Muhymeen	AirAsia	6
1	(Malaysia) Muhd Zamri Hasan	AirAsia	6
3	(Malaysia) Muhd Hafizi Mat Podzi	FELCRA	5
3	(Malaysia) Faiz Nasir	FELCRA	5
5	(Malaysia) Yusri Abas	SAMB	4
5	(Malaysia) Hamizul Izaidi Zulkifli	PKNP	4
7	(Malaysia) J.K. Patmanathan	Ipoh	3
7	(Malaysia) G. Mugenthiran	PKNP	3
9	(Malaysia) M. Yoges	MISC-MIFA	2
9	(Malaysia) K. Ravindran	MISC-MIFA	2
9	(Malaysia) M. Youwaransan	MISC-MIFA	2
9	(Malaysia) S. Silambarasan	MISC-MIFA	2
9	(Malaysia) G. Thipenraj	MISC-MIFA	2
9	(Malaysia) Syamim Alif	Sungai Ara	2
9	(Malaysia) Saufi Ibrahim	Sungai Ara	2
9	(Malaysia) Khairzul Azri Jamal Abdul Haziq	Sungai Ara	2
9	(Malaysia) G. Sivachandran	Megah Murni	2
9	(Malaysia) Mohd Ikmal Ibrahim	FELCRA	2
9	(Malaysia) Muhammad Shahrel Fikri Mohd Fauzi	PKNP	2
9	(Malaysia) Muhd Shahrel Fikri Mohd Fauzzi	PKNP	2
9	(Malaysia) Zamri Morshidi	AirAsia	2
9	(Malaysia) Aikal Aiman Azlan	PBMM	2
9	(Malaysia) Mohd Hakim Zainal	PBMM	2
9	(Malaysia) Muhd Hazim Mohamad	PBMM	2
9	(Malaysia) R. Surendran	Ipoh	2
9	(Malaysia) Hadzirun Che Hamid	UKM	2
9	(Malaysia) Zulhelmi Jumai	Penjara	2

==== Own goal ====
#	Player	Club	±
1	(Malaysia) Peter Anthony	KDMM	1
1	(Malaysia) Firdaus Anuar	Shahzan Muda	1
1	(Malaysia) M. Youwaransan	MISC-MIFA	1

== See also ==
- 2016 Malaysia Super League
- 2016 Malaysia Premier League
- 2016 Malaysia FA Cup
- 2016 Malaysia President's Cup
- 2016 Malaysia Youth League
- List of Malaysian football transfers 2016
- List of Malaysian football transfers summer 2016
