= 2015 Malaysia FAM League =

Malaysia FAM League
- Season: 2015
- Champions: Melaka United (1st title)
- Promoted: Perlis; Melaka United
- Matches played: 163
- Goals scored: 427 (2.62 per match)
- Top goalscorer: Nurshamil Abdul Ghani (15 goals)
- Biggest home win: MISC-MIFA 7 – 0 Kedah United (16 August 2015)
- Biggest away win: Hanelang 0 – 4 UKM (24 May 2015)
- Highest scoring: MISC-MIFA 7 – 0 Kedah United (16 August 2015)
- Longest winning run: 3 games Perlis; Megah Murni
- Longest unbeaten run: 17 games Perlis
- Longest winless run: 8 games Shahzan Muda; AirAsia
- Longest losing run: 4 games Penjara

The 2015 Malaysia FAM League (referred to as the FAM League) is the 63rd season of the FAM League since its establishment in 1952. The league is, currently, the third level football league in Malaysia. Kuantan are the defending champions and currently play in the second level of Malaysian football, Malaysia Premier League.

== Rule changes ==
The FAM League introduced the "home grown players" rule, which aims to encourage the development of young footballers at FAM League clubs. The new rule required clubs to name at least five U-21 players in their squad.

== Season changes ==
The following teams have changed division since the 2014 season.

=== To Malaysia FAM League ===
Relegated from Premier League

- Perlis FA
- (Penang) PBAPP FC

New Team

- (Selangor) Megah Murni F.C.
- (Selangor) AirAsia Allstars F.C.
- (Perak) Ipoh F.A.
- Johor Darul Ta'zim III F.C.
- Penjara F.C.
- (Kuala Lumpur) UKM F.C.
- (Kuala Lumpur) Real Mulia F.C.
- (Kuala Lumpur) Felcra F.C.
- (Kuala Lumpur) Young Fighters F.C.

=== From Malaysia FAM League ===
Promoted to Premier League

- (Pahang) Kuantan FA
- Kuala Lumpur FA

Teams withdrawn

- (Sabah) Cebagoo F.C.
- (Perak) YBU F.C.

== Teams ==
The following teams will be participate in the 2015 Malaysia FAM League. In order by the number given by FAM:-

- Perlis FA
- (Putrajaya) MOF F.C.
- (Penang) PBAPP FC
- (Malacca) Melaka United
- (Pahang) Shahzan Muda S.C.
- Kedah United
- (Selangor) Megah Murni F.C.
- (Malaysia) Harimau Muda C
- (Perak) Ipoh F.A.
- (Penang) Sungai Ara F.C.
- (Malaysia) MISC-MIFA
- (Terengganu) Hanelang F.C.
- Johor Darul Ta'zim III F.C.
- Penjara F.C.
- (Selangor) AirAsia F.C
- (Kuala Lumpur) UKM F.C.
- (Kuala Lumpur) Real Mulia F.C.
- (Kuala Lumpur) Felcra F.C.
- (Kuala Lumpur) Young Fighters F.C.

== Team summaries ==
=== Stadia and locations ===
Locations of teams in the 2015 Malaysia FAM League.
Red: Group A; Blue: Group B;

Team	Location	Stadium	Stadium capacity^{1}
Perlis FA	Kangar	Tuanku Syed Putra Stadium	20,000
PBAPP FC	Georgetown	Bandaraya Stadium	20,000
Megah Murni F.C.	Serdang	UPM Stadium	3,000
Kedah United FC	Langkawi Island	Langkawi Stadium	10,000
Melaka United	Malacca	Hang Jebat Stadium	40,000
Shahzan Muda FC	Temerloh	Temerloh Mini Stadium^{2}	10,000
Sungai Ara F.C.	Sungai Ara	Sungai Ara Mini Stadium	2,000
Harimau Muda C	Bangi	Maybank Stadium	2,000
MOF F.C.	Bangi	INSPEN Stadium, Bangi	770
Johor Darul Ta'zim III F.C.	Kota Tinggi	Bandar Penawar Mini Stadium	TBA
MISC-MIFA	Sungai Petani	Sungai Petani DRB-Hicom - Honda Field	300
Hanelang F.C.	Hulu Terengganu	Padang Astaka Kuala Berang	120
Penjara F.C.	Nilai	Nilai USIM Mini Stadium	3,000
AirAsia F.C.	Serdang	UPM Stadium	3,000
UKM F.C.	Bangi	UKM Stadium	425
Real Mulia F.C.	Bangi	Maybank Stadium	2,000
Felcra F.C.	Kuala Lumpur	University of Malaya Stadium	5,000
Young Fighters F.C.	Nilai	Nilai USIM Stadium	3,000
Ipoh FA	Tanjung Malim	Proton City Stadium	5,000

- ^{1} Correct as of end of 2014 Malaysia FAM League season
- ^{2} Shahzan Muda uses the Darul Makmur Stadium until the grass pitch re-laid work being done in Temerloh Mini Stadium.

=== Personnel and kits ===
Note: Flags indicate national team as has been defined under FIFA eligibility rules. Players and Managers may hold more than one non-FIFA nationality.

Team	Coach	Captain	Kit Manufacturer	Shirt Sponsor
AirAsia F.C.	(Malaysia) Mohd Nidzam Jamil	(Malaysia) Mohd Firdaus Mohd Afandi	Ego Sport	AirAsia
Felcra F.C.	(Malaysia) Azman Eusoff	(Malaysia) Wan Izzat Izzaruddin Alif Wan Ismail	Line 7	FELCRA
Hanelang F.C.	(Malaysia) Abdul Rahim Ahmad	(Malaysia) Shaiful Hazmi	Kika	Kamal Sport
Harimau Muda C	(Malaysia) Hassan Sazali Waras	(Malaysia) Dominic Tan	Nike	
Ipoh FA	(Malaysia) Mohd Zakaria Mohamed	(Malaysia)	Al- Ikhsan	
Johor Darul Ta'zim III F.C.	(Malaysia) Mohd Hamzani Omar	(Malaysia)	Nike	Country Garden
Kedah United	(Malaysia) Abdullah Hassan	(Malaysia) Mohd Shukri Fadzil	Warrix	E-Idaman
Young Fighters F.C.	(Malaysia) Azmi Mohamed	(Malaysia) Azrul Azmi	Puma	FELDA
Melaka United	(Malaysia) Mat Zan Mat Aris	(Malaysia) Mohd Azizan Baba	Kronos	Mamee
Megah Murni F.C.	(Malaysia) R. Nallathamby	(Malaysia) Wan Mohd Azwari Wan Nor	Line 7	Megah Murni Technology & Construction
MISC-MIFA	(Malaysia) Jacob Joseph	(Malaysia) K. Nanthakumar	Kappa	New Affirmative Action Movement
MOF F.C.	(Malaysia) Mohd Hashim Mustapha	(Malaysia) Khairul Zal Azmi Zahinudden	Adidas	
PBAPP FC	(Malaysia) Kamal Khalid	(Malaysia) Khairzul Azri Jamal Abdul Haziq	Line 7	Penang Water Supply Corporation
Penjara F.C.	(Malaysia) Hamzah Hussain	(Malaysia) Razrin Hamid Abdul Razak	Kappa	
Perlis FA	(Malaysia) Yusri Che Lah	(Malaysia) Azi Shahril Azmi	Carino	
Real Mulia F.C.	(Malaysia) Yunus Alif	(Malaysia) Mohd Fazli Zulkifli	Adidas	Mulia
Shahzan Muda FC	(Malaysia) Tajuddin Nor	(Malaysia) Mohd Faizal Musa	Kappa	
Sungai Ara F.C.	(Morocco) Merzagua Abderrazak	(Malaysia) Mohd Idzwan Salim	Line 7	FastBike
UKM F.C.	(Malaysia) Asnan Mohd Zuki	(Malaysia) Mohd Suffian Saad	Kika	KPM

== Group stage ==
=== Group A ===
Pos	Team	Pld	W	D	L	GF	GA	GD	Pts	Promotion
1	Perlis (P)	18	12	6	0	33	10	+23	42	Promotion to Premier League and final round
2	Real Mulia	18	9	5	4	19	14	+5	32	Withdrew from FAM League and dissolved.
3	Megah Murni	18	7	6	5	18	15	+3	27	
4	UKM	18	6	7	5	26	20	+6	25	
5	PBAPP	18	7	4	7	22	20	+2	25	Withdrew from FAM League and dissolved.
6	Sungai Ara	18	6	6	6	16	17	−1	24	
7	Felcra	18	5	6	7	20	24	−4	21	
8	Shahzan Muda	18	5	5	8	22	25	−3	20	
9	Penjara	18	5	1	12	25	40	−15	16	
10	Hanelang	18	3	4	11	18	34	−16	13	

Source: FAM Official Site
Rules for classification: 1) Points; 2) Goal difference; 3) Number of goals scored
(P) Promoted

==== Result table ====
Home \ Away	FCR	HAN	MMU	PBA	PJR	PER	RMU	SMU	SGA	UKM
Felcra		2–2	0–1	0–0	1–2	0–0	1–2	0–0	2–0	4–3
Hanelang	1–2		0–1	3–1	4–1	0–2	1–2	1–1	2–2	0–4
Megah Murni	0–1	3–1		1–0	1–4	2–3	0–1	3–1	0–0	1–1
PBAPP	3–0	1–0	1–0		3–0	1–1	0–1	4–0	0–1	0–2
Penjara	1–2	3–0	0–2	0–2		3–3	0–3	3–2	1–2	0–1
Perlis	3–1	2–0	0–0	2–0	5–0		2–0	1–0	4–1	2–1
Real Mulia	1–0	1–1	0–0	1–1	2–4	0–1		2–1	0–0	1–1
Shahzan Muda	3–2	3–0	1–2	1–1	2–1	1–1	0–1		3–0	0–0
Sungai Ara	0–0	2–0	1–1	4–1	1–0	0–1	0–1	2–0		0–0
UKM	2–2	1–2	0–0	2–4	4–2	0–0	0–1	3–1	1–0	

Updated to match(es) played on 23 August 2015. Source: Malaysia FAM League
Legend: Blue = home team win; Yellow = draw; Red = away team win.

=== Group B ===
Pos	Team	Pld	W	D	L	GF	GA	GD	Pts	Promotion
1	Melaka United (C, P)	16	11	3	2	30	13	+17	36	Promotion to Premier League and final round
2	MISC-MIFA	16	11	3	2	33	17	+16	36	
3	Young Fighters	16	9	4	3	28	17	+11	31	Withdrew from FAM League and dissolved.
4	MOF	16	6	3	7	29	27	+2	21	
5	Kedah United	16	6	2	8	16	29	−13	20	Withdrew from FAM League and dissolved.
6	Harimau Muda C	16	5	4	7	26	28	−2	19	Withdrew from FAM League and dissolved.
7	AirAsia	16	4	4	8	15	21	−6	16	
8	Ipoh F.A.	16	4	1	11	16	27	−11	13	
9	Johor Darul Ta'zim III	16	2	4	10	10	24	−14	10	Relocated to President's Cup

Source: FAM Official Site
Rules for classification: 1) Points; 2) Goal difference; 3) Number of goals scored
(C) Champions; (P) Promoted

==== Result table ====
Home \ Away	AAS	HMC	IPO	JDT	KUN	MEL	MIF	MOF	YFI
AirAsia		2–2	0–2	2–0	3–0	0–1	1–2	0–0	1–1
Harimau Muda	3–0		1–2	1–1	0–1	1–1	2–3	4–3	4–1
Ipoh F.A.	1–2	1–2		1–0	1–2	1–2	2–2	3–1	0–3
Johor DT III	0–0	1–0	1–0		0–0	1–4	1–2	2–3	0–1
Kedah United	1–2	2–0	1–0	2–0		0–3	0–1	1–4	0–2
Melaka United	1–0	5–1	1–0	2–0	3–1		2–0	1–1	0–2
MISC-MIFA	3–2	4–2	1–0	1–1	7–0	2–0		2–1	1–1
MOF	2–0	0–0	5–2	3–2	1–3	1–2	0–2		3–1
Young Fighters	2–0	1–3	3–0	2–0	2–2	2–2	2–0	2–1	

Updated to match(es) played on 16 August 2015. Source: Malaysia FAM League
Legend: Blue = home team win; Yellow = draw; Red = away team win.

== Final ==
29 August 2015
20:45 UTC+8

Melaka United (Malacca)	3–2	Perlis
Nurshamil Abd Ghani 38', 72', 90+2'	Report	Mohd Syafiq Azmi 15' (pen.), 60'

Hang Jebat Stadium, Melaka
Attendance: 38,000
Referee: Zulkifli Ahmad

== Season statistics ==
=== Scoring ===
==== Top scorers ====
As of matches played on 16 April 2015.

Rank	Player	Club	Goals
1	(Malaysia) Nurshamil Abd Ghani	Melaka United	15
2	(Malaysia) Mohd Syafiq Azmi	Perlis	14

== Champions ==
Champions
Melaka United
1st title

== See also ==
- 2015 Malaysia Super League
- 2015 Malaysia Premier League
- 2015 Malaysia FA Cup
- 2015 Malaysia President's Cup
- 2015 Malaysia Youth League
