= 2014 Malaysia FAM League =

Malaysia FAM League
- Season: 2014
- Champions: Kuantan FA
- Promoted: Kuantan FA; Kuala Lumpur FA

The 2014 Malaysia FAM League (referred to as the FAM League) is the 62nd season of the Malaysia FAM League since its establishment in 1952. The league is currently the third-level football league in Malaysia. Penang are the defending champions and currently play in the second level of Malaysian football, Malaysia Premier League.

Kuantan FA won the league with two matches to spare, their first title in their 2-year FAM League participation, after a 1–1 draw with MOF F.C. on 20 June 2014, while Kuala Lumpur FA clinched second place with one match to spare, after a 2–1 win over Perak YBU F.C. on 25 June 2014. Both teams gain promotion to 2015 Malaysia Premier League as a result.

== Teams ==
The following teams will be participate in the 2014 Malaysia FAM League. In order by the number given by FAM:-

- Kuala Lumpur FA
- (Putrajaya) MOF F.C.
- (Perak) YBU FC
- (Pahang) Kuantan FA
- Malacca United SA
- (Pahang) Shahzan Muda SC
- PB Melayu Kedah
- (Sabah) Cebagoo
- (Malaysia) Harimau Muda C
- (Penang) Sungai Ara F.C.
- (Malaysia) MISC-MIFA
- (Terengganu) Hanelang F.C.

== Season changes ==
The following teams have changed division since the 2013 season.

=== To Malaysia FAM League ===
Relegated from 2013 Malaysia Premier League

- Kuala Lumpur FA

New Team

- (Malaysia) MISC-MIFA
- (Putrajaya) MOF F.C.
- (Penang) Sungai Ara
- (Terengganu) Hanelang

=== From Malaysia FAM League ===
Promoted to 2014 Malaysia Premier League

- Penang FA
- (Penang) PBAPP FC

Teams withdrawn

- (Kelantan) Tumpat FA
- Tentera Darat F.A.
- (Negeri Sembilan) NS Betaria FC (Relegated from 2013 Malaysia Premier League)

=== Team summaries ===
==== Stadium ====
Team	Location	Stadium	Stadium capacity^{1}
Perak YBU FC	Ipoh	Padang PCRC, Ipoh	500
Kuantan FA	Kuantan	Darulmakmur Stadium	40,000
Cebagoo FC	Sepanggar	Penampang Stadium	3,000
PB Melayu Kedah	Alor Setar	Padang Terbuka Ibu Pejabat MADA	300
Malacca United F.C.	Malacca	Hang Jebat Stadium	40,000
Shahzan Muda FC	Temerloh	Temerloh Mini Stadium	10,000
Sungai Ara F.C.	Sungai Ara	Sungai Ara Mini Stadium	10,000
Harimau Muda C	Kuala Lumpur	Maybank Academy Fields	100
MOF F.C.	Kuala Lumpur	INSPENS Stadium, Bangi	1,000
Kuala Lumpur FA	Kuala Lumpur	UKM Stadium, Bangi	1,000
MISC-MIFA	Kuala Lumpur	Subang Jaya Mini Stadium, Subang Jaya	
Hanelang F.C.	Hulu Terengganu	Padang C, Kompleks Sukan Gong Badak	500

==== Personnel and kits ====
Note: Flags indicate national team as has been defined under FIFA eligibility rules. Players and Managers may hold more than one non-FIFA nationality.

Team	Coach	Captain
Perak YBU FC	Saiyuddin Mohd Isa	Mohd Arif Fazlie Saidin
Selangor FA	Mehmet Durakovic	Mohd Bunyamin Umar
Cebagoo FC	David Johnny@Mohd Aiiyman Abdullah	Razlan Oto
PB Melayu Kedah	Husin Jaafar	Mohamad Rozaidi Abdul Rahim
Malacca United F.C.	Ladislav Totkovič	Mohd Fauzzi Kassim
Shahzan Muda FC	Tajuddin Nor	Muhd Helmi Abdullah
Sungai Ara F.C.	Azhar Abdul Rahman	Adam Abdul Malik
Harimau Muda C	Hassan Sazali Waras	Mohd Adib Zainuddin
PBAPP FC	Yunus Alif	Mohd Hazrul Shah Abdul Hakim
MISC-MIFA	K. Thaiyananthan	N. Dhurai
Hanelang F.C.	Mustapha Kamal Abdul Wahab	Mohd Asysham Asri
MOF F.C.	Abdul Jalil Ramli	Khairul Zal Azmi Zahinudden

== League table ==
Pos	Team	Pld	W	D	L	GF	GA	GD	Pts	Promotion
1	Kuantan FA	22	15	3	4	40	18	+22	48	Promotion to 2015 Malaysia Premier League
2	Kuala Lumpur FA	22	12	7	3	34	16	+18	43	Promotion to 2015 Malaysia Premier League
3	Shahzan Muda FC	22	12	2	8	34	24	+10	38	
4	Harimau Muda C	22	11	4	7	33	24	+9	37	
5	PB Melayu Kedah	22	10	4	8	25	31	−6	34	
6	Malacca United F.C.	22	8	4	10	34	37	−3	28	
7	Cebagoo	22	7	6	9	25	32	−7	27	Withdrew from FAM League and dissolved.
8	Hanelang F.C.	22	7	4	11	22	31	−9	25	
9	MISC-MIFA	22	6	5	11	28	37	−9	23	
10	MOF F.C.	22	5	7	10	26	36	−10	22	
11	Sungai Ara F.C.	22	3	11	8	20	24	−4	20	
12	YBU F.C	22	4	7	11	24	34	−10	19	Withdrew from FAM League and dissolved.

Updated to match(es) played on 25 June 2014. Source: MFL Official Site
Rules for classification: 1) points; 2) goal difference; 3) number of goals scored.

== Results ==
=== Week 1 ===
9 March	Harimau Muda C	2–3	MOF F.C.	Kompleks Sukan Maybank, Bangi
16:45 UTC+08:00	Syazwan Andik 81', 88'		Rery Martinaz 38'; Azirol Ramli 48'; Shahrul Rizal Alha 74'	Attendance: 280; Referee: J. Suresh

9 March	Kuala Lumpur FA	2–1	MISC-MIFA	Stadium Mini Persada PLUS, Kelana Jaya
16:45 UTC+08:00	Zulkifli Affendi 20'; S. Shanmugananthan 61'		B. Tinagaran 18'	Attendance: 300; Referee: Teoh Hee Loon

9 March	Malacca United F.C.	0–0	YBU FC	Hang Jebat Stadium, Malacca
16:45 UTC+08:00				Attendance: 300; Referee: Kamal Ahmad

9 March	Cebagoo F.C.	2–1	Hanelang F.C.	Penampang Stadium, Sabah
16:15 UTC+08:00	Juffry Omopor 45'; Razlan Oto 75'		Faizuddin Manjur Ahmad 69'	Attendance: 1,000; Referee: Ahamad Zuladi

9 March	Kuantan FA	0–0	Sungai Ara F.C.	Darul Makmur Stadium Pahang
20:45 UTC+08:00

=== Week 2 ===
12 March	MISC-MIFA	1–2	Kedah Malays FA	UPM Mini Stadium, Serdang
16:45 UTC+08:00	Fauzi Kadar 62'		Hakimi Hussin 33'; Azahari Azizan 38'	Attendance: 150; Referee: Helday Idang

12 March	Hanelang F.C.	1–0	Harimau Muda C	Fields C, Gong Badak Sports Complex, Kuala Terengganu
16:45 UTC+08:00	Hazrul Nizam 88'			Attendance: 200; Referee: Zairo Azril Zakaria

12 March	YBU FC	0–1	Kuantan FA	Perak Stadium, Ipoh
16:45 UTC+08:00			Hazwan Fakhrullah 80'	Attendance: 100; Referee: Fairuz Zulkiflee

12 March	Shahzan Muda F.C.	2–1	Malacca United F.C.	Temerloh Stadium, Pahang
20:45 UTC+08:00	Helmi Abdullah 75'; Hariz Fazrin 79'		Amir Shahreen 7'	Attendance: 300; Referee: Ahmad Fareez Mat Suburi

12 March	MOF F.C.	0–2	Kuala Lumpur FA	Maybank Academy Stadium Bangi
20:45 UTC+08:00			Syazwan Rani 45+1'; Romdhizat Jamian 90'	Attendance: 50; Referee: Sani Tani

=== Week 3 ===
16 March	Kedah Malays FA	0–4	Kuala Lumpur FA	Darul Aman Stadium, Alor Star
16:45 UTC+08:00			B. Prabaharan 18', 30', 59'; Taufiq Shukor 24'	Attendance: 150; Referee: Dennis Sayeng

16 March	Malacca United F.C.	5–2	MISC-MIFA	Hang Jebat Stadium, Malacca
16:45 UTC+08:00	S. Saravanakumar 9(og)' Mohd Yusri Abas 27', 42', 58'; Amir Shahreen Abd Mubin 55'		P. Saran 45+1'; R. Sauntarayan 50'	Attendance: 966; Referee: Azham Musa

16 March	Kuantan FA	2–3	Shahzan Muda F.C.	Darul Makmur Stadium, Kuantan
16:45 UTC+08:00	Farizal Mohd Nor 70'; Hazwan Fakhrullah 80'		Nursyazwan Mahsar 13'; Helmi Abdullah 50', 61'	Attendance: 100; Referee: Mohd Afzarizam Mamat

16 March	YBU FC	1–1	Cebagoo F.C.	Perak Stadium, Ipoh
16:15 UTC+08:00	Fauzi Ariffin 48'		Razlan Oto 90+4'	Attendance: 100; Referee: Wan Zainudin Harun

16 March	Harimau Muda C	1–0	Sungai Ara F.C.	Kompleks Sukan Maybank, Bangi
16:45 UTC+08:00

16 March	Hanelang F.C.	1–0	MOF F.C.	Fields C, Gong Badak Sports Complex, Kuala Terengganu
16:45 UTC+08:00	Kamal Baharin 8'			Attendance: 200; Referee: Mohd Almi Abdullah

=== Week 4 ===
23 March	MISC-MIFA	1–3	Kuantan FA	Subang Jaya Municipal Council Sports Complex, Selangor
16:45 UTC+08:00	K. Premananthan 79'		Khairul Jasri 3'; Kamal Rodiarjat 11'; Zarrin Asyraff 22'	Attendance: 100; Referee: Dennis Sayeng

23 March	Kuala Lumpur FA	3–1	Malacca United F.C.	UPM Mini Stadium, Serdang
16:45 UTC+08:00	Chairi Emmir 28'; Syazwan Rani 48'; Fariz Ismail 83'		K. Rajan 7'	Attendance: 200; Referee: Nik Mohd Zain

23 March	Sungai Ara F.C.	2–3	Hanelang F.C.	USM Athletics Stadium, Penang
20:45 UTC+08:00	Syamil Masdhoki 16'; Asyraf Zainol Abidin 77'		Faizuddin Manjur 58'; Hazrul Nizam 64'; Asysham Asri 86'	Attendance: 250; Referee: Mohd Jefri Zolkefli

23 March	YBU FC	0–3	Harimau Muda C	PCRC Fields, Ipoh
16:15 UTC+08:00			Syazwan Andik 19'; Awangku Hamirullizam 88'; Adam Shafiq 90+3'	Attendance: 100; Referee: Suresh Jayaraman

23 March	Shahzan Muda F.C.	2–3	Cebagoo F.C.	Temerloh Stadium, Temerloh
20:45 UTC+08:00	Helmi Abdullah 63'; Nor Abdah Alif 81'		Marwan Kadir 20'; Rainol Masaat 38'; Razlan Oto 68'	Attendance: 300; Referee: Ku Alauddin Muhamad

23 March	MOF F.C.	1–0	Kedah Malays FA	Maybank Academy Stadium, Bangi
16:45 UTC+08:00	Mohd Nizaruddin Yusof 1'			Attendance: 50; Referee: Khairul Rizal ismail

== Season statistics ==
=== Top scorers ===
As of 13 March 2013

Rank	Player	Club	Goals
1	Syazwan Andik	Harimau Muda C	2
2	Rery Martinaz Ali	MOF F.C.	1
2	Muhd Azirol Ramli	MOF F.C.	1
2	Muhd Shahrul Rizal Alha	MOF F.C.	1
2	Zulkifli Affendi Zakri	KL	1
2	S. Shanmugananthan	KL	1
2	Syazwan Rani	KL	1
2	Romdhizat Jamian	KL	1
2	B. Tinagaran	MISC-MIFA	1
2	Fauzi Abdul Kadar	MISC-MIFA	1
2	Juffry Omopor	Cebagoo	1
2	Razlan Oto	Cebagoo	1
2	Muhd Hakimi Hussin	PB Melayu Kedah	1
2	Mohd Azahari Azizan	PB Melayu Kedah	1
2	Mohd Faizuddin Manjur Ahmad	Hanelang F.C.	1
2	Hazrul Nizam Mustafa	Hanelang F.C.	1
2	Hazwan Fakhrullah Zuridi	Kuantan FA	1
2	Muhd Helmi Abdullah	Shahzan	1
2	Muhd Hariz Fazrin Nazri	Shahzan	1
2	Amir Shahreen	Melaka	1

=== Own goals ===
Rank	Player	For	Club	Own Goal

=== Hat-tricks ===
Player	For	Against	Result	Date

== See also ==
- 2014 Malaysia Super League
- 2014 Malaysia Premier League
- 2014 Malaysia Cup
- 2014 Malaysia FA Cup
