= Mohd Norizam Salaman =

Malaysian footballer

Norizam Salaman
Personal information
- Full name: Mohd Norizam bin Salaman
- Date of birth: 6 March 1984 (age 42)
- Place of birth: Johor, Malaysia
- Height: 1.76 m (5 ft 9 1/2 in)
- Position: Striker

Youth career
- 2000–2002: Johor President's Cup

Senior career*
Years	Team	Apps	(Gls)
2002–2009	Johor FA	63	(21)
2010	Negeri Sembilan FA	10	(2)
2011	Johor FA	18	(10)
2012	FELDA United	16	(5)
2013–2014	Penang FA	43	(15)
2015	AirAsia F.C.	0	(0)
- * Club domestic league appearances and goals as of 23 December 2015 ‡ National team caps and goals as of 23 December 2015

Norizam Salaman (born 6 March 1984 in Johor) is a Malaysian footballer played as a striker.

== Career ==
=== Penang FA ===
Norizam joins Penang FA for the 2013 season. He first season with Penang his scored 12 goals in the league thus helping the team to gain promotion to the Malaysia Premier League.

=== AirAsia FC ===
AirAsia FC announced the signing of Norizam on 26 January 2015.

== Honours ==
Negeri Sembilan

- Malaysia FA Cup: 2010

Penang

- Malaysia FAM League: 2013

=== Individual ===
- Malaysia FAM League Top goalscorer: 2013
