= Mohd Shafie Zahari =

Malaysian footballer

Shafie Zahari
Personal information
- Full name: Mohd Shafie bin Zahari
- Date of birth: 3 January 1993 (age 33)
- Place of birth: Pahang, Malaysia
- Height: 1.77 m (5 ft 9 1/2 in)
- Position: Striker

Team information
- Current team: Shahzan Muda FC
- Number: 26

Youth career
- 2010: Malaysia national under-17 football team
- 2011–present: Pahang FA President's Cup Team

Senior career*
Years	Team	Apps	(Gls)
2011–2016	Pahang FA	19	(3)
2017–	Shahzan Muda FC		
- * Club domestic league appearances and goals as of January 03, 2016 ‡ National team caps and goals as of January 03, 2016

Shafie Zahari (born 3 January 1993 in Pahang) is a Malaysian footballer currently playing for Shahzan Muda FC in FAM League.
