= Mohd Arif Fazlie Saidin =

Malaysian footballer

Arif Fazlie
Personal information
- Full name: Mohd Arif Fazlie bin Saidin
- Date of birth: 30 January 1987 (age 39)
- Place of birth: Perak, Malaysia
- Position: Defender

Youth career
- 2006–2008: Perak FA President Cup's Team

Senior career*
Years	Team	Apps	(Gls)
2008–2010	Perak FA	2	(0)
2011	Penang FA	10	(0)
2013–2014	Perak YBU FC		

International career
2005	Malaysia U-21		
- * Club domestic league appearances and goals as of 18 June 2011

Mohd Arif Fazlie bin Saidin (born 30 January 1987) is a Malaysian footballer. His playing position is as a central defender.

== Career ==
Arif Fazlie started his professional career in Perak FA youth squad. Starting from the 2009 season, he was one of several Perak youth players promoted to main squad after the exodus of Perak players to other teams. He played 2 games during Perak's 2009 Malaysia Super League campaign.

He signed to play for Penang in 2011. He dropped down a division to join Penang, who were just relegated to the 2011 Malaysia Premier League. His contract was not renewed at the end of the 2011 season.

After a year without a club, he joined Perak YBU FC for the 2013 Malaysia FAM League season. After the club were disbanded following the conclusion of the 2014 Malaysia FAM League season, Arif is currently a free agent.

== International career ==
He have played in the Malaysia national under-21 football team in 2005.
