= Razlan Oto =

Malaysian footballer

Personal information
- Full name: Razlan Bin Oto
- Date of birth: 18 February 1984 (age 42)
- Place of birth: Sandakan, Sabah, Malaysia
- Height: 1.76 m (5 ft 9 1/2 in)
- Position: Forward

Team information
- Current team: DYS F.C.
- Number: 8

Senior career*
Years	Team	Apps	(Gls)
2005–2006	Sabah FA		
2007–2008	Johor FC		
2009–2014	Sabah FA		
2014–2015	Cebagoo F.C.		
2016–	DYS F.C.		
- * Club domestic league appearances and goals

Razlan Bin Oto (born 18 February 1984) is a Sabah footballer.

Razlan has played for his state team Sabah FA for seven years in two spells, and also played for Johor FC for two years. As of 2014, he plays football for Sabah-based club Cebagoo F.C. in the Malaysia FAM League, and is the captain of the team.
