= Wan Abu Yazid Bustami =

Malaysian footballer

Wan Abu Yazid
Personal information
- Birth name: Wan Abu Yazid Bustami bin Wan Mokhter
- Date of birth: 27 June 1989 (age 37)
- Place of birth: Perak, Malaysia
- Position: Midfielder

Team information
- Current team: Perak YBU F.C.

Youth career
- 2007: Perak FA

Senior career*
Years	Team	Apps	(Gls)
2008	Perak FA	3	(1)
- * Club domestic league appearances and goals as of 27 January 2008

Wan Abu Yazid Bustami bin Wan Mokhter (born 27 June 1989) is a Malaysian professional footballer. He last played for Perak FA in the Malaysian Super League. He is left-sided midfielder.

Wan Abu Yazid is a product of the Perak FA youth system. He is a regular for the FAM President's Cup team and was part of their championship-winning batch of 2007. He made his first ever appearance for Perak in a 5-0 demolition of Sarawak FA on 1 January 2008. He played the full 90 minutes of that match.

Wan Abu Yazid made his second appearance as a substitute against Pahang FA on 19 January 2008. He scored his first senior goal on 26 January in a match against PDRM FC which ended 6–0.

Wan Abu Yazid were not retained in Perak squad for the 2009 season.
