= Felcra F.C. =

Malaysian football club

Felcra Football Club
- Full name: Federal Land Consolidation and Rehabilitation Authority Football Club
- Nicknames: The Rivals; The Consolidators
- Short name: FFC
- Founded: 2012; 14 years ago
- Dissolved: 2018; 8 years ago
- Ground: Shah Alam Stadium
- Capacity: 80,372
- Owner: Felcra Berhad
- President: Ismail Kassim
Home colours	Away colours	Third colours

Felcra Football Club or Federal Land Consolidation and Rehabilitation Authority Football Club, commonly known as Felcra FC, was a Malaysian professional football club based in Setapak, Kuala Lumpur. The club most recently played in the second-tier Malaysia Premier League in 2018.

Felcra FC has participated in Malaysian football since 2012 KLFA Division 3. 2015 season of FAM League was their debut in the third-tier league. The club was widely known as The Consolidators.

== History ==
Felcra FC was the runner-up of 2013 KLFA Division 2 League after lost to KPKT FC in the final.

=== 2016 season ===
After securing the seventh spot of the 2015 Malaysia FAM League in Group A, Felcra FC is determined to redeem last season loss by signed on six experienced players; Azizi Matt Rose, Azi Shahril Azmi, Mohd Fazliata Taib, Shahrizal Saad and Mohd Fadzli Saari. Former national midfielder Shahrulnizam Mustapa, was appointed as the club captain based on the leadership qualities and experience.

=== 2017 season ===
On 5 February, during the first round of Malaysia FA Cup, Felcra FC won over Penjara FC 2–0 scored by Mohd Firdaus Azizul on penalties and Shazuan Ashraf Mathews.

During second window transfer, the club has signed K. Ravindran from MISC-MIFA, Rahizi Rasib from Negeri Sembilan and Alif Samsudin from Melaka United to strengthen the club for the remaining league matches.

Felcra FC secured second place in FAM League in league stage after 14 matches and collected 25 points. The club advanced to knock-out stage and defeated Terengganu City by 2–1 on aggregate in the two-leg quarter-finals.

Eventually, the club lost in the semi-finals against Sime Darby.

=== 2018 season ===
After Sime Darby announced their withdrawal from the Premier League participation in November 2017, Felcra FC was invited as their replacement. In the 2018 Malaysia Premier League, the team achieved second place, behind champions Felda United FC and above more established state teams. The position means they have been promoted to a higher league for second season in a row.

At the end of the year, media reported that the main sponsor Felcra Berhad will pull out due to restructuring its group of companies. Malaysia Football League have given Felcra FC until November 15 to decide whether to continue participating in Super League or pulling out. Felcra FC management confirmed their pull-out of the team from Malaysia Football League controlled competitions on 15 November 2018, and pledged to settle all their players and staffs wages before ending their contracts.

== Club officials (final) ==
Position	Name
President	(Malaysia) Ismail Kassim
Vice president	(Malaysia) Hazian Murad
Manager	(Malaysia) Mohd. Fauzi Mohd. Tahir
Assistant manager	(Malaysia) Shahriman Teruna Md. Isa
Director of football	(Malaysia) Norizan Bakar
Head coach	
Assistant coach 1	(Malaysia) Rosle Md. Derus
Assistant coach 2	(Malaysia) Mohd Fadzli Saari
Goalkeeping coach	(Malaysia) Megat Amir Faisal
Fitness coach	(Malaysia) Mohd. Hafizuddin Ramli
Head of physio	(Malaysia) Mohd. Lutfi Abdul Samad
Physio	(Malaysia) Muhammad Iqbal Afiq bin Azmi
Assistant physio	(Malaysia) Ibrahim Md. Tia
Kitman	(Malaysia) Masri Mustaffa
Security officer	(Malaysia) Mohd. Najib Miswan
Security officer 2	(Malaysia) Mohammad Azrul Tajudin
Media officer	(Malaysia) Zamri Zainon Abidin

=== Coaching history ===
Head coaches by years (2013–2018)

Years	Name	Nationality
January 2013–May 2015	Mohd. Yassin Ali	(Malaysia)
May–October 2015	Azman Eusoff	(Malaysia)
November 2015–April 2017	Yusri Che Lah	Malaysia
May–December 2017	Rosle Md. Derus	(Malaysia)
December 2017–2018	Tarcísio Pugliese	(Brazil)

=== Captain history ===
Captain by years (2015–2018)

Years	Name	Nationality
2015	Wan Izzat Izzaruddin Alif Wan Ismail	(Malaysia)
2016–2017	Mohd Fadzli Saari	(Malaysia)
2018	Shahrom Kalam	(Malaysia)

== Honours ==
=== League ===
- Malaysia Premier League

- Runners-up (1): 2018

== Achievements ==
Year	Position	League	FA Cup	Malaysia Cup\Malaysia Challenge Cup	Top scorer
2015	7th, Group A	Malaysia FAM League	Not Participated	Not Participated	
2016	2nd, Group A	Malaysia FAM League	First round	Not Participated	
2017	2nd, Group A	Malaysia FAM League	Second round	Not Participated	
2018	2nd (promoted)	Malaysia Premier League	Second round	Group stage	(Brazil) Casagrande (20 goals)

== Kit manufacturers and sponsors ==
Period	Sportswear	Sponsor
2015	(Malaysia) Line 7	Felcra
2016	(South Korea) Kika	Felcra
2017	(Germany) Uhlsport	Felcra
2018	(Germany) Uhlsport	Felcra

Title sponsors:

- Felcra Berhad
- Kolej Felcra

Partners:

- University of Malaya
- Sportflex Malaysia
- Kamal Sports
