= Sungai Ara F.C. =

Football team playing in Malaysia FAM League

Sungai Ara
- Full name: Sungai Ara Football Club
- Nickname: The Jungle Cats
- Founded: 2014; 12 years ago
- Ground: USM Athletics Stadium
- Capacity: 1,000
- Manager: Zainol Abidin Ahmad
- League: Malaysia FAM League
- 2016: 2015 Malaysia FAM League, Group A, 6th
Home colours	Away colours	Third colours

Sungai Ara Football Club (commonly known as Sungai Ara F.C.) was a Malaysian semi-professional football club based in Sungai Ara, a suburb of George Town in Penang, Malaysia. Founded in 2014, the club competed in the Malaysia FAM League the third tier of the Malaysian football league system for three seasons before withdrawing in February 2017 due to financial constraints.

== History ==
=== Foundation and state-level roots (2014) ===
Prior to its formal establishment at the national level, football in Sungai Ara had strong grassroots roots within Penang's local amateur competitions. The modern club was formally organized in 2014 under team manager Zainol Abidin Ahmad. In the same year, Sungai Ara F.C. gained entry into the 2014 Malaysia FAM League, becoming one of several community and institution-backed teams representing Penang alongside the state's primary side, Penang FA.

In their inaugural 2014 campaign, the club played its home fixtures at the USM Athletics Stadium in George Town. Competing in a single division 12 team format, Sungai Ara F.C. finished 11th overall and did not qualify for the Malaysia FA Cup.

=== Merzagua Abderrazak era and national cup runs (2015–2016) ===
Ahead of the 2015 season, Sungai Ara F.C. gained widespread local media attention by appointing former Moroccan striker Merzagua Abderrazak as head coach on a one year contract in November 2014. Abderrazak was a prominent figure in Penang football, having played for Penang FA in the 1990s and coached the state side to the 2013 FAM Cup title. Upon his arrival, he oversaw a six-month pre-season preparation involving roughly 30 friendly matches, aiming to build fitness and target promotion to the Malaysia Premier League by 2016.

During the 2015 Malaysia FAM League, which expanded and split into two groups, Sungai Ara F.C. improved significantly to finish 6th out of 10 teams in Group A. The club also made its debut in the Malaysia FA Cup, advancing to the second round.

For the 2016 Malaysia FAM Cup (rebranded from the FAM League), Azhar Abdul Rahman took over as head coach. The club posted its strongest league campaign, finishing 4th out of 9 teams in Group A, and once again reached the second round of the Malaysia FA Cup. Throughout its active years, the club served as a developmental pathway for Penang-born players, including goalkeeper Mohd Faizal Mohd Yusoff, who later signed with top-flight side Terengganu FA for the 2017 season.

=== Financial difficulties and withdrawal (2017) ===
Although Sungai Ara F.C. was registered to compete in the 2017 Malaysia FAM Cup, the club faced severe sponsorship shortages ahead of the new campaign. On 15 February 2017 just days before the season's opening fixtures management officially announced the club's withdrawal from the competition via its social media channels, citing a failure to secure financial sponsorship. The Football Association of Malaysia (FAM) accepted the withdrawal, leaving 15 teams in the 2017 tournament. Following its exit, the club ceased national operations.

== Stadium ==
Sungai Ara F.C. primarily played its home matches at the USM Athletics Stadium (Stadium Olahraga USM), located within the Universiti Sains Malaysia campus in George Town, which holds a capacity of 1,000 spectators.

== Players (2014) ==
No.	Name	Nationality	Position
1	Isyafrial Azizly Ishak	(Malaysia)	GK
22	Mohd Faizal Mohd Yusoff	(Malaysia)	GK
25	Amir Omar Khata	(Malaysia)	GK
2	Mohd Faizal Musa	(Malaysia)	CB
3	Mohd Aliff Mohd Puat	(Malaysia)	RB, RWB
4	Mohd Azizi Abdul Aziz	(Malaysia)	RB, RWB
5	Mohd Helmi Abdul Razak	(Malaysia)	CB
6	Syahrul Syazwan Zahar	(Malaysia)	CB
16	Aliff Afifi Arief	(Malaysia)	LB, LWB
24	Mohd Idzwan Salim	(Malaysia)	CB
7	Al-Hafiz Aziz Jaafar	(Malaysia)	CM, AM
11	Muhamad Izaidi Musa	(Malaysia)	CM
14	Mohd Nazmi Abdul Aziz	(Malaysia)	RM, RW
15	Mohd Syazwan Kassim	(Malaysia)	CM
17	Syamil Masdhoki	(Malaysia)	LM, LB, LW
23	Wan Hossen Wan Abdul Ghani	(Malaysia)	CM, DM
26	Muhammad Aliff Zainol Abidin	(Malaysia)	AM, CM
10	Mustafa Amini Ismail	(Malaysia)	ST
19	Mohamad Zailani Ramli	(Malaysia)	ST
21	Mohd Saufi Ibrahim	(Malaysia)	ST

== Officials (2014) ==
=== Coaching staff ===
Position	Name
Manager	Zainol Abidin Ahmad
Assistant manager	Aziz Din
Assistant coach	Abdul Rahim Hassan
Assistant coach	Nordin Kamis
Fitness coach	Mat Zali Lazim
Goalkeeping coach	Noor Mohd Sultan
Physiotherapist	Aizat Khaliz Rozain

== Season-by-season record ==
Season	Division	Position	Malaysia FA Cup	Malaysia Cup
2014	Malaysia FAM League	11th of 12	Did not qualify	Did not qualify
2015	Malaysia FAM League	6th of 10 (Group A)	Second round	Did not qualify
2016	Malaysia FAM Cup	4th of 9 (Group A)	Second round	Did not qualify

== Notable managers and coaches ==
Years	Name	Role
2014	Abdul Rahim Hassan	Head coach
2014–2015	Merzagua Abderrazak	Head coach
2016	Azhar Abdul Rahman	Head coach

== See also ==
- Football Association Penang
- Malaysia FAM Cup
- List of football clubs in Malaysia
