= Mohd Reithaudin Awang Emran =

Malaysian footballer

Mohd Reithaudin Emran
Personal information
- Full name: Mohd Reithaudin Awang Emran
- Date of birth: 5 August 1978 (age 48)
- Place of birth: Lahad Datu, Malaysia
- Height: 1.82 m (5 ft 11 1/2 in)
- Position: Defender

Team information
- Current team: DYS F.C.
- Number: 5

Senior career*
Years	Team	Apps	(Gls)
2000–2006	Sabah	64	(6)
2006–2008	Perlis	26	(2)
2009	Malacca	16	(0)
2010–2012	Sabah	32	(1)
2012	→ Perak (loan)	5	(0)
2013	Cebagoo	21	(0)
2014—2015	Sabah FA	22	(0)
2016	DYS F.C.	0	(0)
- * Club domestic league appearances and goals as of 4 July 2014 ‡ National team caps and goals as of 4 July 2014

Mohd Reithaudin Awang Emran (born 5 August 1978, in Lahad Datu) is a Malaysian professional football player from state of Sabah, last played at Sabah FA before retiring.

He previously played for Sabah (which he made his professional debut in 2000 by then coach Ken Shellito), Perlis and Malacca. He also has joined Perak on loan from Sabah, along with two other Sabah players in August 2012 for the duration of Perak's 2012 Malaysia Cup campaign.

He was not retained in the Sabah squad for the 2013 Malaysia Premier League campaign. After a spell as a guest player for semi-professional club in the Malaysia FAM League Cebagoo in 2013, Reitahudin were selected back in the Sabah squad for 2014.
