= Johor Bahru FA =

Malaysian football club

- Full name: Johor Bahru Football Association
- Nickname: The Roaring Lions
- Short name: JBFA
- Founded: 2000; 26 years ago
- Ground: Educity Stadium
- Capacity: 6,000
- President: Mohammed Ridha Abdul Khadir
- League: Malaysia M3 League
- 2019: Malaysia M3 League, 11th of 14

The Johor Bahru Football Association (simply known as the JBFA) is a Malaysian football club based in Johor Bahru, Johor. Its senior side last played in the third-tier Malaysia M3 League. They play their home matches at the 6,000 capacity Educity Stadium in Nusajaya.

== Season by season record ==
As of 26 November 2019

Season	Division	Position	Malaysia Cup	Malaysian FA Cup	Malaysian Charity Shield	Regional	Top Scorer (All Competitions)
2019	Liga M3	11th of 14	DNQ	Second round	–	–	(Nigeria) Jose Alex (10)

== Honours ==
=== Domestic competitions ===
- Malaysia FAM League

(gold) Winners (1): 1984

- Sultan Johor Cup

(gold) Winners (1), 2018
