= Petaling Jaya City FC =

Malaysian football club

PJ City
- Full name: Petaling Jaya City Football Club
- Nickname: The Phoenix
- Short name: PJCFC
- Founded: 2004; 22 years ago as MIFA
- Dissolved: 2022; 4 years ago
- Website: www.pjcityfc.com

Petaling Jaya City Football Club, simply known as PJ City FC, is a Malaysian defunct football club based in Petaling Jaya, Selangor, owned by QI Group. The club was established to represent the community living in Petaling Jaya city. In 2016, the club won the Malaysia FAM League title and was promoted to the second division of Malaysian football, the Malaysia Premier League. From 2019 to 2022, Petaling Jaya City FC participated in the Malaysia Super League.

== History ==
=== Malaysian Indian Football Association ===
Malaysian Indian Football Association was established on 26 April 2004 by the founder and former president, M.S. Maniam. In 2003, the idea of having an Indian based Football Association was brought upon to MIFA's pioneer members S. Pathy, S. Rajamanikam and M.S. Maniam. They travelled around the nation, forming various State Indian Football Associations to be affiliated with the Malaysian Indian Football Association. MIFA serves as a springboard for young Indian football players who harbour the desire to elevate their skills.

The first tournament organised by MIFA was the inaugural Samy Vellu competition which was won by Selangor. In 2006, under the leadership of Vel Paari, MIFA expended the competitions to include Dato’ K. Pathmanaban Cup and Dato' M.S. Maniam Cup, which was one of the key factors in the growth of Malaysian Indian football community. MIFA participated in the 59th & 60th Coppa Carnival in Italy in 2007 and 2008. In 2008, T. Mohan took over the presidency of MIFA and had introduced a few more competitions? such as Tan Sri Dato’ S. Subramaniam Cup and Inter Media Tournaments.

=== Malaysian Indian Sports Council - Malaysian Indian Football Association ===
In 2014, the Malaysian Indian Sports Council and Malaysian Indian Football Association have joined forces to field a team in the Malaysia FAM League competition. The team was approved to participate in 2014 Malaysia FAM League, the third division of Malaysian football.

The club was created as an effort by the Malaysian Indian Football Association to elevate Indian community involvement in sports and produce more Indian players in Malaysian football as a whole. In 2013, the U-23 team has managed to become champion in the France International Indian tournament.

In preparations for the club participation in Malaysia FAM League, the club had RM 1.3 million budget. In the first season in national competition, the club only managed to finish at ninth place. The club nearly got promoted to the second division after finishing second in group B of 2015 Malaysia FAM League. After two years without silverware, the club has increased their budget for the 2016 Malaysia FAM League, setting it to RM 800,000 in their bid to win the third division.

On 10 October 2016, the club finally qualified to get promoted to 2017 Malaysia Premier League. The club has set aside a decent budget of RM 3.5 million for their maiden season in 2017 Malaysia Premier League. MISC-MIFA ended their 2017 Malaysia FA Cup campaign in second round after a defeat of 6–3 against Negeri Sembilan FA.

In the 2018 Malaysia Premier League season, MISC-MIFA improved their standings by finishing third in the league, and also delivering shock in 2018 Malaysia Cup season by beating defending champions Johor Darul Ta'zim FC in the group stage, although they failed to advance. In December 2018 it was announced by Malaysia Football League that MISC-MIFA will be promoted to 2019 Malaysia Super League as the next best placed team in the 2018 Malaysia Premier League, replacing Felcra FC who pulled out of the league. Also the management has announced possibilities to change the team name.

=== Rebranding process ===
The MISC-MIFA was rebranded as Petaling Jaya City FC on 16 January 2019.

== Colours and badge ==
2004–2018

2019–2022

== Stadium ==
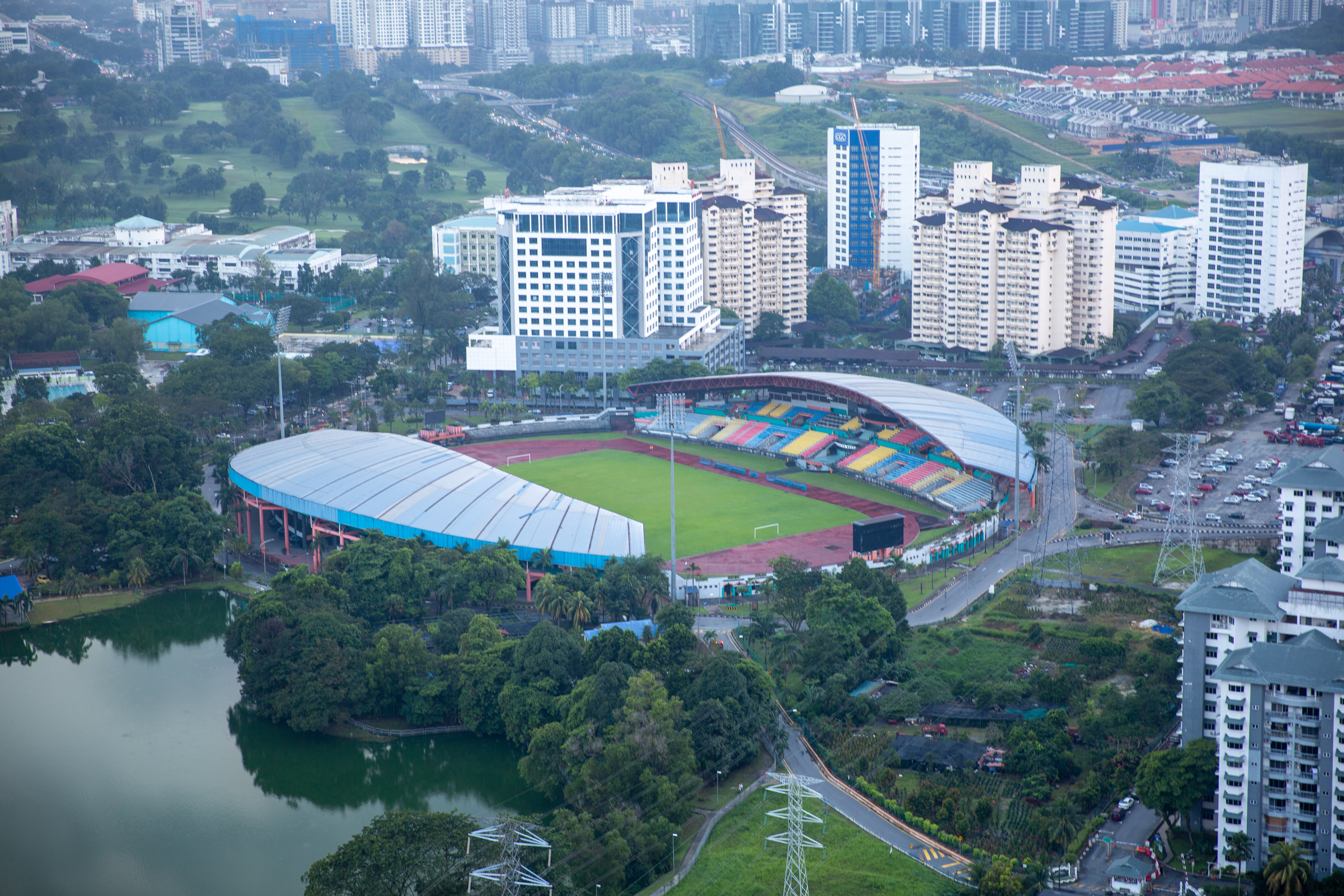
MBPJ Stadium

Petaling Jaya City FC was based at MBPJ Stadium in Kelana Jaya, Petaling Jaya, Selangor. The capacity of the stadium is 25,000. The club has used the USIM Mini Stadium in Nilai for the 2016 season.

Coordinates	Location	Stadium	Capacity	Year
3°5′55.35″N 101°35′37.57″E	Petaling Jaya	MBPJ Stadium	25,000	2017–2022

== Sponsorship ==
Petaling Jaya City FC was owned by QI Group. The club's kit has been manufactured by Umbro since 2016. In the 2018 season, the club switched to Puma (under formerly known MISC-MIFA). The club's main shirt sponsor was QNet.

Season	Kit manufacturer	Shirt sponsor
2014	Kappa	ABNXcess / NAAM
2015	Kappa	NAAM / Megatech
2016–2017	Umbro	Mifa
2018	PUMA	MAHSA University
2019–2022	PUMA	QNet

== Season by season record ==
Note:

- Pld = Played, W = Won, D = Drawn, L = Lost, F = Goals for, A = Goals against, D = Goal difference, Pts= Points, Pos = Position

1st or Champions 2nd or Runner-up 3rd place Promotion Relegation

Season	League										Cup			Asia	
Season	Division	Pld	W	D	L	F	A	D	Pts	Pos	Charity	Malaysia	FA	Competition	Result
2014	FAM League	22	6	5	11	28	37	-9	23	9th	–	Did not qualify	–	–	–
2015	FAM League	16	11	3	2	33	17	+16	36	2nd Group B	–	Did not qualify	Second round	–	–
2016	FAM League	22	15	4	3	41	18	+13	48	Champions	–	Did not qualify	First round	–	–
2017	Premier League	22	4	2	16	36	51	-15	16	10th	–	Did not qualify	Second round	–	–
2018	Premier League	20	9	5	6	36	26	+10	32	3rd	–	Group stage	Second round	–	–
2019	Super League	22	8	2	12	22	29	−7	26	8th	–	Group stage	Third round	–	–
2020	Super League	11	3	5	3	17	16	+1	14	7th	–	Cancelled	Cancelled	–	–
2021	Super League	22	6	6	10	16	28	-12	24	7th	–	Group stage	Cancelled	–	–

== Head coaches ==
- (Malaysia) K. Thaiyananthan (2014)
- (Malaysia) Jacob Joseph (2015–2017)
- (Malaysia) Devan E. Kuppusamy (2017–2020)
- (Malaysia) Maniam Pachaiappan (2020–2022)

== Honours ==
=== Domestic competitions ===
==== League ====
- Malaysia FAM League

(gold) Winners (1): 2016

==== Cups ====
- Malaysia Cup

Winners: -

- Malaysia FA Cup

Winners: -

- Malaysia Charity Shield

Winners: -

==== Youth ====
- Malaysia Youth Cup

Winners: -

- Malaysia President Cup

Winners: -

=== International competitions ===
==== AFC ====
- AFC Cup

Winners: -

==== Youth ====
- France International Indian Tournament

(gold) Winners (1): 2014

== Feeder clubs ==
- MISC-MIFA
