= Cebagoo F.C. =

Malaysian football club

Cebagoo
- Full name: Cebagoo Football Club
- Founded: 1991; 35 years ago
- Ground: Kompleks Sukan Universiti Malaysia Sabah
- Capacity: 250
- Chairman: Mohammad Joh Wid
- Head coach: Mohd Ayman Abdullah
- League: Malaysia FAM League
- 2013: Malaysia FAM League, 7th
Home colours	Away colours

Cebagoo Football Club or Cebagoo is a Malaysian football club, based in Sepanggar, Kota Kinabalu, Sabah that formerly played in the Malaysia FAM League. After 2014 Malaysia FAM League season concluded, the club pulled from the league and focused on development of youth and grassroots program in Sabah.

== History ==
The Cebagoo Football Club was formed by fishermen off the coast of Sabah in 1991. The club founded on the name of Kampung Kebagu, Sepanggar. It was known as Cebagoo Star before rebranding it to Cebagoo Football Club. In 2011–12 season, the club won the Liga Carino-SAFA Bandaraya Kota Kinabalu after defeating Beverly FC 2–1 in the final. In October 2012, Cebagoo has unveiled their plans to take part in the Malaysia FAM League. They became the fifth football club to have represented Sabah in the competition. Malaysia former international Razali Zinin joined them as the head coach for their campaign in the FAM League. On 17 February 2013, Cebagoo made their debut in the Malaysia FAM League on a winning note after defeating Melaka 2–0 at the UMS Stadium. They concluded their season with a 0–0 draw against Tumpat on 1 July 2013, with the record of four wins, six draws and 10 defeats.

== Honours ==
- Liga Carino-SAFA Bandaraya Kota Kinabalu

Winners (1): 2011–12

== Club captains ==
Years	Name
2012	(Malaysia) Mohammad Nizam Jefferi
2013	(Malaysia) Mohd Reithaudin Awang Emran
2014	(Malaysia) Mohd Hafizi fitri

== Club management (2014) ==
- Team manager: Mohammad Ishak Datuk Ayub
- Assistant manager: Asri Abdul Mali
- Head coach: Mohd Ayman Abdullah
- Fitness coach: Hassan Madisah
- Physiotherapist: Eszico Joseph
- Kitman: Jamal Damin
- Secretary: Rosmat Apiu
- Assistant secretary: Mohidin Zainal
- Media officer: Mino Erysah Arshad
