= Perak YBU F.C. =

Malaysian football club

YBU FC
- Full name: Yayasan Bina Upaya Football Club
- Founded: 2012; 13 years ago
- Ground: Perak Stadium
- Capacity: 40,000
- Owner: Yayasan Bina Upaya Darul Ridzuan
- League: Malaysia FAM League
Home colours	Away colours

YBU FC was a team playing in Malaysia FAM League. The team is based in the city of Ipoh, Perak, Malaysia. On 2012 the team was promoted to play in Malaysia FAM League. The team ended the 2014 Malaysia FAM League season in the last place and in then withdrew from the league starting from 2015 season.

== Sponsorship ==
For season running from 2012, Yayasan Bina Upaya Darul Ridzuan was club's first shirt sponsor. The manufacturer is Joma.

== Kit manufacturers and financial sponsor ==
- Material manufacturers: Joma
- Financial sponsors: Yayasan Bina Upaya Darul Ridzuan

== Stadium ==
YBU FC are currently based at Perak Stadium in Ipoh, Perak. The capacity of the stadium is 40,000. This has been Perak FA's ground since 1965. The Stadium was built in 1964 and aims to provide a venue for sports activities from Ipoh, especially as a soccer field. It was built on the site of a football field of Perak Football Association.

== Officials ==
Senior officials

- Patron:
- President/Chairman: Saarani Mohamad
- Manager:
- Head coach:
