= PBAPP F.C. =

Former Malaysian professional football club

PBAPP
- Full name: Perbadanan Bekalan Air Pulau Pinang Football Club
- Nickname: The Waterboys
- Founded: 2012; 13 years ago
- Dissolved: 2016; 9 years ago
- Ground: Penang State Stadium, Batu Kawan, Pulau Pinang
- Capacity: 40,000
- Owner: Penang Water Supply Corporation
- Chairman: Lim Guan Eng
- Manager: Ir. Jamil Mohd Noor
- League: Malaysia FAM League
- 2015: Malaysia FAM League Group A, 5th
- Website: http://www.pbappfc.blogspot.com/

Perbadanan Bekalan Air Pulau Pinang Football Club was a Malaysian football club based in the city of Penang, representing the state of Pulau Pinang, Malaysia.

== History ==
Founded in 2012, it was registered under the name of Perbadanan Bekalan Air Pulau Pinang Football Club (Malay: Kelab Bolasepak Perbadanan Bekalan Air Pulau Pinang) and started playing in the third-tier Malaysia FAM League in the 2012 season. During the 2013 season, the club finished second in the league and was promoted to the 2014 Malaysia Premier League. After just a season, the club was relegated after finishing at the bottom of the table. After the 2015 season, the club has withdrawn from the league and dissolved in 2016.

== Stadiums ==
The Penang State Stadium was the home stadium of PBAPP FC. The stadium has a capacity of 40,000 spectators. Previously, PBAPP FC also played at the City Stadium in George Town.

== Kit manufacturers and shirt sponsors ==
Period	Kit manufacturer	Shirt partner
2012	Line 7	PBAPP
2013	Kappa	PBAPP
2014–2015	Joma	PBAPP

== Final coaching staff ==
Position	Name
Team manager	(Malaysia) Ir. Jamil Mohd Noor
Head coach	(Malaysia) Yunus Alif
Assistant coach	(Malaysia) Bahazenan Hj Osman
Fitness coach	(Malaysia) Abdul Rahim Hassan
Goalkeeping coach	(Malaysia) Noor Mohd Sultan
Physio	(Malaysia) Mohd Ibnu Noordin

== Coaches ==
- Zabidi Hassan (2012–2013)
- Yunus Alif (2013–2015)

== Honours ==
- Malaysia FAM League
  - Runners-up (1): 2013
