= Harimau Muda C =

- Full name: Malaysia under-19 football team
- Nickname(s): ThevYoung Tigers
- Founded: 2013; 12 years ago
- Dissolved: 2015; 10 years ago
- Ground: Wisma FAM
- Capacity: 1,000
- Manager: Othman Aziz
- League: Malaysia FAM League
- 2014: FAM League, 7th
Home colours	Away colours

Harimau Muda C was the Football Association of Malaysia managed U-19 team that took part in the Malaysia FAM League from 2013 season. The team was aimed at developing Malaysian youth players. By entering Harimau Muda C in domestic competitions, FAM was helping them prepare for international tournaments. On 25 November 2015, it was confirmed that the Harimau Muda has disbanded. The name "Harimau Muda" means "Young Tigers" in English.

== History ==
Harimau Muda C was formed to provide a bigger pool of players and become a feeder team for Harimau Muda B. Harimau Muda C made their debut in the 3rd Division of Malaysian football, the FAM League.

== International records ==
=== AFF Youth Championship ===
AFF U-19 Youth Championship Record
Year	Round	GP	W	D	L	GS	GA
2008	did not enter	-	-	-	-	-	-
2009	Semifinal	3	2	0	1	9	3
2010	did not enter	-	-	-	-	-	-
2011	Semifinal	4	2	1	1	12	1
2013	Group stage	5	2	2	1	9	4
Total	3/2	12	6	3	3	30	8

== See also ==
- Malaysia national football team
- Malaysia national under-23 football team
- Malaysia Pahang Sports School
- Malaysia XI
- FAM-MSN Project
- Singa Muda Perlis F.C.
