= Kuantan FA =

Malaysian football club

Marcerra Kuantan FA
- Full name: Kuantan Football Association
- Nickname: The Seagulls
- Short name: KFA
- Founded: 1970; 55 years ago
- Ground: MP Selayang Stadium
- Capacity: 16,000
- League: Malaysia Premier League
- 2017: Malaysia Premier League, 9th

Kuantan Football Association (Malay: Persatuan Bolasepak Daerah Kuantan) is a defunct Malaysian association football club based in Kuala Lumpur. The club was established in 1970 and began competing in the local league as Kuantan FA. In early 2018, the club's right was sold to Marcerra United. The club last played in the Malaysia Premier League.

The club's most prestigious achievement was winning the 2014 FAM League and promotion to the Malaysia Premier League. Kuantan FA won the league with two matches to spare after a 1–1 draw with MOF FC on 20 June 2014.

== Stadium ==
Prior to its purchase by Marcerra United F.C. and its defunct, the club originally played most of its matches in Darul Makmur Stadium in Kuantan, Pahang. The previous owner and chairman of the club had planned to the club out of Darul Makmur Stadium and build their own stadium somewhere near Kuantan. They felt that it was necessary to move out of Darul Makmur Stadium and out of Pahang FA's shadow in order for the club to grow and gain popularity among the locals. Some rumoured the planned stadium site was located in Tanjung Lumpur. In 2018 they moved their home ground at MP Selayang Stadium in Selangor until the Football Association of Malaysia sanctioned the club to close down in April 2018.

== Notable former players ==
- List of former players who played professionally or have represented there nation at senior level.

Malaysia

- (Malaysia) Malik Ariff
- (Malaysia) Shazalee Ramlee
- (Malaysia) Helmi Remeli
- (Malaysia) Abdul Manaf Mamat
- (Malaysia) Abdul Hadi Yahya
- (Malaysia) Daudsu Jamaluddin
- (Malaysia) Zairul Fitree Ishak

Timor-Leste

- (Timor-Leste) Murilo de Almeida

South Korea

- (South Korea) Lee Kwang-Hyun

Serbia

- (Serbia) Ljubo Baranin

Montenegro

- (Montenegro) Milan Purović

Romania

- (Romania) Alexandru Tudose

Haiti

- (Haiti) Fabrice Noël

Brazil

- (Brazil) Andrezinho

== Coaches ==
Coaches by years (2013–2018)

Name	Nat	Period	Honours
Abu Bakar Ahmad	(Malaysia)	2013	
Hamzah Mat Yunus	(Malaysia)	January 2014–April 2014	
Ahmad Muda	(Malaysia)	April–November 2014	
Ridzuan Abu Shah	(Malaysia)	November 2014–January 2015	2014 Malaysia FAM League
Aminuddin Hussin	(Malaysia)	January–May 2015	
Mohd Shukri Ismail (interim)	(Malaysia)	May–July 2015	
Zulhamizan Zakaria	(Malaysia)	July 2015–April 2016	
Ahmad Nazri Mat Noor (interim)	(Malaysia)	April–November 2016	
Zulhamizan Zakaria	(Malaysia)	November 2016–December 2017	
Ismail Zakaria	(Malaysia)	December 2017–November 2018	

== Honours ==
=== League ===
- Division 3/ FAM Cup/FAM League
  - Winners (3): 1975, 1977, 2014
    - Runners-up: 1974, 1976

== Kits ==
Period	Sportswear	Sponsor
2013	(United States) Nike	Tafcom
2014	(Germany) Puma	Tafcom
2015	(Italy) Kappa	Nilaitek
2016	(Italy) Kappa	Wangsa Makmur Capital; Killiney Coffee; Nilaitek
2017	(Malaysia) SkyHawk	None
2018	(Italy) Kappa	Green Tech
