= Shahzan Muda F.C. =

Malaysian football club

Shahzan Muda
- Full name: Shahzan Muda Football Club
- Nickname: The Dolphins
- Founded: 1 December 2005; 20 years ago
- Ground: Temerloh Mini Stadium
- Capacity: 10,000
- Chairman: Tengku Abdul Rahman ibni Sultan Ahmad Shah
- Manager: Tajuddin Nor
- League: Malaysia FAM League
- 2017: Malaysia FAM League group A, 5th
Home colours	Away colours

Shahzan Muda Football Club was a Malaysian professional football club based in Kuantan, Pahang. The club last played in the Malaysia FAM League, the third tier of the Malaysian football league system.

== Achievements ==
Year	Position	League	FA Cup	Malaysia Cup
2008	3/10	Malaysia Premier League	Round 1	Not participating
2009	8 /14	Malaysia Premier League	Round 1	Not participating
2010	12/12	Malaysia Premier League	Round 1	Not participating
2011	4/11	Malaysia FAM League	Not participating	Not participating
2012	2/9	Malaysia FAM League	Round 1	Not participating
2013	9/11	Malaysia FAM League	Round 1	Not participating
2014	3/12	Malaysia FAM League	Round 1	Not participating
2015	8/10	FAM League Group A	Round 1	Not participating
2016	5/9	FAM League Group A	Round 2	Not participating
2017	5/9	FAM League Group A	Round 2	Not participating

== Final staff ==
- Manager: Wan Kamarul Nahar Wan Mustapha
- Assistant manager: Noraishah Ahmad
- Head coach: Tajuddin Nor
- Assistant head coach: Bahazenan Othman
- Goalkeeping coach: Abdul Samad Mat Salleh
- Physio: Mohd Riduan Amin

== Final players ==
No.	Name	Nationality	Position	D.O.B
Goalkeeper
22	Muhammad Yusuf Akma Mohd Nawi	(Malaysia)	GK	15/4/97
25	Mohd Syujak Nasir	(Malaysia)	GK	7/2/94
Defenders
2	Khairul Annas Ibrahim	(Malaysia)	RB, RWB	4/5/95
3	Mohd Ridhwan Maidin	(Malaysia)	CB, CM	27/4/94
4	Mohd Firdaus Anuar	(Malaysia)	RB, RWB	7/7/94
5	Azuan Izam	(Malaysia)	CB, RB	17/11/93
13	Mohd Badrul Amin Mohd Yusof	(Malaysia)	CB	1997
14	Muhammad Helmi Mustaqim bin Mokhtar	(Malaysia)	CB	28/5/94
15	Mohd Hilmi Husaini Asmadii	(Malaysia)	LB, LWB, LM	16/3/95
20	Mohd Shahrizan Salleh	(Malaysia)	LB, LWB	16/1/82
24	Wan Muhammad Idham Wan Sulaiman (captain)	(Malaysia)	LB, CB, DM, CM	10/2/89
Midfielders
6	Mohd Nor Saifuruddin Ngah	(Malaysia)	CM	15/6/94
7	Rizua Shafiqi Kamaruzaman	(Malaysia)	RM, CM, AM	14/6/93
10	Mohd Rifaie Awang Long	(Malaysia)	AM, CM, ST	24/8/90
11	Mohd Shafizi Mohd Zain	(Malaysia)	RW, RM	5/3/95
12	Muhd Hariz Fazrin Mohd Nazri	(Malaysia)	LW, LM	6/2/93
18	Nor Azizul Hafiz Nazrudin	(Malaysia)	DM, CM	14/1/97
21	Helmi Abdullah	(Malaysia)	CM, AM	3/10/89
23	Mohd Amir Ashraf Hussin	(Malaysia)	LW, LM	3/6/98
Strikers
8	Mohd Faizal Abdul Rani	(Malaysia)	ST	17/1/94
9	Muhd Aizuddin Che Aziz	(Malaysia)	ST, AM	20/2/90
16	Muhd Amirul Kasmuri	(Malaysia)	ST	6/5/94
17	Mohd Firdaus Razak	(Malaysia)	ST	19/8/95
19	Mohd Shafie Zahari	(Malaysia)	ST	3/1/93

Source: Source:

=== Transfers ===
For recent transfers, see List of Malaysian football transfers 2017 and List of Malaysian football transfers summer 2016

== Coaching record ==
Year	Manager/coach
2005–2008	Che Nasir Salleh, Tajuddin Nor
2008–2010	Zainal Abidin Hassan, Dollah Salleh
2012–2013	Jalaluddin Mohd Din
2014–2015	Mukaram Shah Zainuddin
2016	Wan Kamarul Nahar Wan Mustapha
2017	Tajuddin Nor

== Affiliated clubs ==
- Sri Pahang FC
- Kuantan FA
