= Malaysia FAM Cup =

FAM Cup
- Founded: September 1951; 75 years ago (as knock-out cup tournament); 2008; 18 years ago (as league)
- Folded: 2019; 7 years ago
- Country: Malaysia
- Confederation: AFC
- Number of clubs: 64
- Level on pyramid: 3
- Promotion to: Malaysia Premier League (2004–2018)
- Domestic cup: Malaysia FA Cup
- Last champions: Terengganu City (1st title)
- Most championships: Selangor (7th title)
- Broadcaster(s): Astro Arena

The FAM Cup (Malay: Piala FAM) was a knock-out football tournament for the Malaysia M3 League and the Malaysia M4 League in Malaysia. From 2008 to 2018 it was held as a third-tier league and used the FAM League (Liga FAM) name.

The competition was first held in September 1951. Up to 1973, the competition was open to state teams that also competed in the Malaysia Cup, before the Football Association of Malaysia (FAM) opened up the competition to club sides from 1974 onwards.

== Format ==
- 1951–1973: as a secondary knockout competition between state teams only after Piala Malaysia.
- 1974–1989: as a secondary knockout competition between club teams only after Piala Malaysia.
- 1990–2007: as a third-tier knockout competition.
- 2008–2018 : as a third-tier league competition.

== History ==
Piala FAM was established in August 1951 as a secondary knockout competition to the more prestigious Malaya Cup. The competition was held between the state teams and uniformed units including Singapore, the Police, the Army, and the Malaysian Prison Department in its early days. The inaugural season started in September 1951 after the Malaya Cup final concluded. The final was held on 26 April 1952 between Penang and Selangor which was won by Penang. Starting in 1974, the state teams were barred from entering the competition and only club sides were allowed to enter.

With the advent of the two-division Semi-Pro League in 1989, the FAM Cup became a third-tier competition. In 1993, the format of the competition was changed to include a two-group league which was followed by a traditional knockout format. Promotion to the professional M-League was introduced for the first time in 1997, with Johor FC and NS Chempaka becoming the first two sides to be promoted that year.

The final knockout competition format was played out for the 2007 season where four clubs were promoted including the champions, runners-up and the losing semi-finalists. In 2008, further changes were made when the knockout stages were abolished and a double round-robin league format was introduced. The tournament was now known as Liga FAM.

In 2016, the FAM decided to rename the competition again from Liga FAM back to its original name, the Piala FAM. However, the format of the competition was still contested as a league tournament as before. The final match for the 2016 season was broadcast by Astro Arena. A total of 16 clubs competed in the competition for the 2017 season and was divided into two groups. On 15 February 2017, Sungai Ara withdrew from the league and left the competition with 15 clubs in total.

It was announced on 19 December 2018 that the format was changed back to a straight knock-out tournament, starting from the 2019 season. This proposal was scrapped however as the Football Association of Malaysia rebranded the competition as the Malaysia M3 League from the 2019 season onwards, with the FAM taking control of both the Malaysia M3 League and the Malaysia M4 League as well.

== Logo evolution ==
Since the inception of the competition in 1951, numerous logos were introduced to reflect the sponsorship. For the 2017 season a new logo was unveiled.

The logo that was used from 2013 until the end of the 2015 season.

== Champions ==
=== As Malaysia FAM Cup ===
| No. | Season | Champions | Runners-up | Score in final |
|---|---|---|---|---|
| 1 | 1952 | Penang | Selangor | 5–0 |
| 2 | 1953 | Kelantan | Selangor | 1–1 (Trophy shared) |
| 3 | 1954 | Kelantan | (Malaysia) Combined Services @ ATM FA | 2–1 |
| 4 | 1955 | Penang | Selangor | 2–1 |
| 5 | 1956 | Penang | Negeri Sembilan FA | 5–1 |
| 6 | 1957 | Penang | Malacca FA | 8–1 |
| 7 | 1958 | (Malaysia) Combined Services @ ATM FA | Malacca FA | 3–1 |
| 8 | 1959 | Perak | Johor FA | 1–0 |
| 9 | 1960 | Selangor | Perak | 5–0 |
| 10 | 1961 | Selangor | Penang | 5–3 |
| 11 | 1962 | Selangor | Penang | 4-3 (a.e.t.) |
| 12 | 1963 | Singapore FA | Kelantan | 7–0 |
| 13 | 1964 | Perak | Selangor | 7–1 |
| 14 | 1965 | Perak | Singapore FA | 3–2 |
| 15 | 1966 | Selangor | Johor FA | 3–0 |
| 16 | 1967 | Singapore FA | Selangor | 2–1 |
| 17 | 1968 | Selangor | Penang | 3–2 |
| 18 | 1969 | Terengganu | Selangor | 3–1 |
| 19 | 1970 | Penjara F.C. | Selangor | 3–2 |
| 20 | 1971 | Penjara F.C. | Kelantan | 5–2 |
| 21 | 1972 | Selangor | Kelantan | 2–1 |
| 22 | 1973 | Penjara F.C. | Johor FA | 1–0 |
| 23 | 1974 | UMNO Selangor F.C. | (Pahang) Kuantan | 2–1 |
| 24 | 1975 | (Pahang) Kuantan | LKPP Kelantan F.C. | 1–0 |
| 25 | 1976 | (Selangor) Kelab Sukan Adabi | (Pahang) Kuantan | 1–0 |
| 26 | 1977 | (Pahang) Kuantan | (Kelantan) Kelab Kilat Kota Bharu | 2–2 (Trophy shared) |
| 27 | 1978 | (Negeri Sembilan) NS Indians F.C. | (Selangor) PKNS F.C. | 0–0 (Trophy shared) |
| 28 | 1979 | (Selangor) PKNS F.C. | (Selangor) Hong Chin F.C. | 2–1 |
| 29 | 1980 | (Pahang) Darulmakmur F.C. | (Negeri Sembilan) NS Indians F.C. | 4–1 |
| 30 | 1981 | (Penang) SPPP FC | (Kuala Lumpur) UMBC F.C. | 4–2 |
| 31 | 1982 | (Selangor) Kelab Sultan Sulaiman | (Federal Territories of Malaysia) MARA F.C. | 2–0 |
| 32 | 1983 | (Penang) SPPP FC | ??? | - |
| 33 | 1984 | Johor Bahru FA | (Terengganu) Fajar Hiliran F.C. | 2–1 |
| 34 | 1985 | (Kuala Lumpur) KL Cheqpoint F.C. | (Kuala Lumpur) DBKL F.C. | 1–0 |
| 35 | 1986 | (Penang) PDC F.C. | ??? | - |
| 36 | 1987 | (Kuala Lumpur) DBKL F.C. | (Perak) Kinta Indians F.C. | 1–0 |
| 37 | 1988 | (Kuala Lumpur) DBKL F.C. | ??? | - |
| 38 | 1989 | (Kedah) PKNK FC | (Kuala Lumpur) DBKL F.C. | 1–0 |
| 39 | 1990 | (Kuala Lumpur) DBKL F.C. | ??? | - |
| 40 | 1990-91 | (Kuala Lumpur) DBKL F.C. | (Selangor) Public Bank F.C. | 1–0 |
| 41 | 1991-92 | (Kedah) PKNK F.C. | (Penang) Intel F.C. | 2–1 (a.e.t.) |
| 42 | 1993 | (Penang) Intel F.C. | (Perak) PKNP F.C. | 1–1 (a.e.t.) 5–4 (PSO) |
| 43 | 1994 | (Johor) PKENJ F.C. | (Penang) Intel F.C. | PKENJ F.C. won 1–0 on aggregate 1st leg 1–0; 2nd leg 0–0 |
| 44 | 1995 | (Johor) PKENJ F.C. | LKPP Pahang F.C. | PKENJ F.C. won 2–0 on aggregate 1st leg 1–0; 2nd leg 0–1 |
| 45 | 1996^{1} | (Malacca) TM F.C. | (Johor) PKENJ F.C. | TM FC won 4–3 on penalty 1st leg 2–1; 2nd leg 0–1 |
| 46 | 1997 | ATM | (Negeri Sembilan) NS Chempaka F.C. | ATM FA won 3–0 on aggregate 1st leg 2–0; 2nd leg 1–0 |
| 47 | 1998 | (Malacca) TM FC | (Kelantan) TNB F.C. | TM FC won 5–1 on aggregate 1st leg 4–0; 2nd leg 1–1 |
| 48 | 1999 | (Kelantan) JKR F.C. | (Kuala Lumpur) Malay Mail F.C. | 4–2 |
| 49 | 2000 | (Kelantan) JKR F.C. | (Malaysia) PDRM FA | 1–1 (a.e.t.) 6–5 (PSO) |
| 50 | 2001 | (Selangor) MPPJ FC | (Johor) SAJ Holdings F.C. | 3–1 |
| 51 | 2002 | (Kelantan) JPS F.C. | (Perak) TKN F.C. | 5–0 |
| 52 | 2003 | (Selangor) PKNS F.C. | (Selangor) MK Land F.C. | 3–1 |
| 53 | 2004 | (Penang) Suria NTFA F.C. | (Perak) UPB Jendarata F.C. | 2–1 |
| 54 | 2005 | Kelantan | (Pahang) Shahzan Muda S.C. | 2–0 |
| 55 | 2006 | (Johor) Pasir Gudang United F.C. | ATM | 3–0 |
| 56 | 2007 | (Selangor) Proton F.C. | (Sabah) Beverly F.C. | 4–2 |
| 57 | 2008 | (Terengganu) T-Team | (Johor) MBJB F.C. | Held as league tournament |
| 58 | 2009 | (Kuala Lumpur) Pos Malaysia F.C. | (Penang) USM FC | Held as league tournament |
| 59 | 2010 | (Kuala Lumpur) Sime Darby F.C. | (Penang) SDM Navy Kepala Batas F.C. | Held as league tournament |
| 60 | 2011 | (Negeri Sembilan) NS Betaria FC | (Johor) MBJB F.C. | Held as league tournament |
| 61 | 2012 | Putrajaya SPA F.C. | (Pahang) Shahzan Muda S.C. | Held as league tournament |
| 62 | 2013 | Penang | (Penang) PBAPP F.C. | Held as league tournament |
| 63 | 2014 | (Pahang) Kuantan | Kuala Lumpur | Held as league tournament |
| 64 | 2015 | (Malacca) Melaka United | Perlis FA | 3–2 |
| 65 | 2016 | (Malaysia) MISC-MIFA | (Perak) PKNP F.C. | MIFA won 3–1 on aggregate 1st leg 1–0; 2nd leg 1–2 |
| 66 | 2017 | (Kuala Lumpur) Sime Darby F.C. | (Selangor) UKM F.C. | Sime Darby won 3–2 on aggregate 1st leg 1–0; 2nd leg 2–2 |
| 67 | 2018 | Terengganu City | Selangor United | 2–0 |

== Performances by clubs/teams and states ==
=== Performance by club (1952–2018) ===
| Club | Winners | Runners-up |
|---|---|---|
| Selangor | 7 | 6 |
| Penang | 5 | 3 |
| (Kuala Lumpur) DBKL S.C. | 4 | 2 |
| Kelantan | 3 | 3 |
| (Pahang) Kuantan | 3 | 2 |
| Perak | 3 | 1 |
| (Selangor) PKNS FC | 3 | - |
| Penjara F.C. | 3 | - |
| ATM/Combined Services F.C. | 2 | 2 |
| Singapore FA | 2 | 1 |
| (Johor) PKENJ FC | 2 | 1 |
| (Kelantan) JKR FC | 2 | - |
| (Kedah) PKNK FC | 2 | - |
| (Penang) SPPP FC | 2 | - |
| (Malacca) TM F.C. | 2 | - |
| (Kuala Lumpur) Sime Darby F.C. | 2 | - |
| (Malacca) Melaka United | 1 | 2 |
| (Penang) Intel FC | 1 | 2 |
| (Negeri Sembilan) NS Indians FC | 1 | 1 |
| Terengganu | 1 | - |
| (Selangor) UMNO FC | 1 | - |
| (Selangor) Kelab Sukan Adabi | 1 | - |
| (Kelantan) Kelab Kilat Kota Bharu | 1 | - |
| (Pahang) Darul Makmur FC | 1 | - |
| (Selangor) Kelab Sultan Sulaiman | 1 | - |
| Johor Bahru FA | 1 | - |
| (Kuala Lumpur) KL Cheq Point FC | 1 | - |
| (Penang) PDC F.C. | 1 | - |
| (Selangor) MPPJ F.C. | 1 | - |
| (Kelantan) JPS FC | 1 | - |
| (Penang) Suria NTFA F.C. | 1 | - |
| (Johor) Pasir Gudang United | 1 | - |
| (Kuala Lumpur) Proton F.C. | 1 | - |
| (Terengganu) T-Team | 1 | - |
| (Kuala Lumpur) Pos Malaysia F.C. | 1 | - |
| (Negeri Sembilan) NS Betaria F.C. | 1 | - |
| Putrajaya SPA F.C. | 1 | - |
| (Malaysia) MIFA | 1 | - |
| Terengganu City | 1 | - |
| Johor FA | - | 3 |
| (Pahang) Shahzan Muda S.C. | - | 2 |
| (Perak) PKNP F.C. | - | 2 |
| (Johor) MBJB F.C. | - | 2 |
| Negeri Sembilan | - | 1 |
| LKPP Kelantan F.C. | - | 1 |
| (Selangor) Hong Chin F.C. | - | 1 |
| (Kuala Lumpur) UMBC F.C. | - | 1 |
| (Federal Territories of Malaysia) MARA F.C. | - | 1 |
| (Terengganu) Fajar Hiliran F.C. | - | 1 |
| (Perak) Kinta Indians F.C. | - | 1 |
| (Selangor) Public Bank F.C. | - | 1 |
| LKPP Pahang F.C. | - | 1 |
| (Negeri Sembilan) NS Chempaka F.C. | - | 1 |
| (Kelantan) TNB F.C. | - | 1 |
| (Kuala Lumpur) Malay Mail F.C. | - | 1 |
| (Malaysia) PDRM FA | - | 1 |
| (Johor) SAJ Holdings F.C. | - | 1 |
| (Perak) TKN F.C. | - | 1 |
| (Selangor) MK Land F.C. | - | 1 |
| (Perak) Jenderata F.C. | - | 1 |
| (Sabah) Beverly F.C. | - | 1 |
| (Penang) USM F.C. | - | 1 |
| (Penang) SDMS Kepala Batas F.C. | - | 1 |
| (Penang) PBAPP F.C. | - | 1 |
| Kuala Lumpur | - | 1 |
| Perlis | - | 1 |
| (Selangor) UKM F.C. | - | 1 |
| Selangor United | - | 1 |

=== Performance by states (1952–2018) ===
| Club | Winners | Runners-up |
|---|---|---|
| Selangor | 15 | 13 |
| Penang | 10 | 8 |
| Kuala Lumpur | 8 | 6 |
| Kelantan | 7 | 6 |
| Johor | 4 | 7 |
| Pahang | 4 | 5 |
| Perak | 3 | 5 |
| (Malacca) Melaka | 3 | 2 |
| Terengganu | 3 | 1 |
| Negeri Sembilan | 2 | 3 |
| Singapore | 2 | 1 |
| Kedah | 2 | - |
| (Malaysia) Others | 6 | 3 |
