= 2018 Malaysia FAM Cup =

FAM League
- Season: 2018
- Champions: Terengganu City
- Promoted: Terengganu City; Selangor United
- Matches: 68
- Goals: 158 (2.32 per match)
- Top goalscorer: Yusaini Hafiz (11 goals)
- Biggest home win: MPKB 4 − 1 MOF (1 April 2018)
- Biggest away win: D'AR Wanderers 1 − 5 PJ Rangers (1 April 2018); MPKB 1 − 5 Selangor United (29 April 2018)
- Highest scoring: D'AR Wanderers 1 − 5 PJ Rangers (1 April 2018); MPKB 1 − 5 Selangor United (29 April 2018)
- Longest winning run: 3 Matches; Terengganu City
- Longest unbeaten run: 4 Matches; Terengganu City
- Longest winless run: 6 Matches; DBKL
- Longest losing run: 4 Matches; DBKL
- All statistics correct as of 6 September 2018.

The 2018 Malaysia FAM League was the 67th season of the Malaysia FAM League since its establishment in 1952. The season started on 25 February 2018 and concluded on 6 September 2018. Sime Darby were the defending champions. The season marked the competition's final year as the third tier football league in Malaysia when it was succeeded by the Malaysia M3 League for the 2019 season.

== Season changes ==
The following teams have changed division since the 2017 season.

=== To Malaysia FAM Cup ===
Relegated from the Premier League

- ATM
- Perlis

New Team

- D'AR Wanderers
- Marcerra United
- Young Fighters

=== From Malaysia FAM Cup ===
Promoted to the Premier League

- FELCRA ^{1}
- UKM

Teams withdrawn

- KDMM
- Penjara
- SAMB
- Sime Darby ^{1}

^{1} Originally Sime Darby F.C. were promoted along with UKM F.C. as finalists of the 2017 Malaysia FAM League final, but after Sime Darby announced their withdrawal from participation in the Malaysia Premier League, Felcra F.C., the next highest team in the Malaysia FAM League table, were invited as their replacement.

== Clubs ==
For the 2018 season, 14 teams competed in the league, including nine sides from the 2017 season, two relegated sides from the 2017 Malaysia Premier League and three new teams.

- Armed Forces
- (Pahang) D'AR Wanderers
- Kuala Lumpur City Hall
- Terengganu Hanelang
- (Sarawak) Kuching
- (Pahang) Marcerra United
- (Putrajaya) Ministry of Finance
- (Kelantan) MPKB
- Selangor United
- Perlis
- (Selangor) Petaling Jaya Rangers
- (Pahang) Shahzan Muda
- Terengganu City
- (Kuala Lumpur) Young Fighters

=== Teams, locations and stadia ===
Locations of teams in the 2017 Malaysia FAM Cup

=== Stadium and locations ===
Team	Location	Stadium	Capacity
ATM	Kuala Lumpur	Mindef Stadium	5,000
D'AR Wanderers	Temerloh	Temerloh Mini Stadium	10,000
DBKL	Kuala Lumpur	UM Arena Stadium	1,000
Hanelang	Kuala Berang	Padang Astaka Kuala Berang	1,000
Kuching	Kuching	Sarawak State Stadium	26,000
Marcerra United	Nilai	USIM Mini Stadium	3,000
MOF	Putrajaya	INSPENS Stadium	3,000
MPKB-BRI U-BeS	Kota Bharu	Sultan Muhammad IV Stadium	30,000
Selangor United	Sabak Bernam	Sungai Besar Stadium	15,000
Perlis	Kangar	Tuanku Syed Putra Stadium	20,000
Petaling Jaya Rangers	Petaling Jaya	Petaling Jaya Stadium	25,000
Shahzan Muda	Temerloh	Temerloh Mini Stadium	10,000
Terengganu City	Kuala Terengganu	Sultan Ismail Nasiruddin Shah Stadium	15,000
Young Fighters	Nilai	USIM Mini Stadium	3,000

=== Personnel and sponsoring ===
Team	Head coach	Captain	Kit manufacturer	Sponsor
ATM	(Malaysia) Azhar Abdullah	(Malaysia) Safril Hafizzie	Admiral	Transwater
DBKL	(Malaysia) Razak Jaamadi	(Malaysia) Redzuan Nawi	Diadora	WP Hotel
D'AR Wanderers	(Malaysia) Hashim Mustapha	(Malaysia) Helmi Remeli	Puma	D'AR International Holdings, SilentɃRich Group, Bit Hunter
Hanelang	(Malaysia) Ahmad Yusof	(Malaysia) Zairo Anuar	Adidas	TTB, Tulangis Group
Kuching	(Malaysia) Fairuz Yunus	(Malaysia) Fareez Tukijo	Starsport	Kuching
Marcerra United	(Malaysia) Faizul Mohd Zaman	(Malaysia) Isskandar Zukarnaen	Kappa	Greentech
MOF	(Malaysia) Manzoor Azwira	(Malaysia) Syazwan Roslan	Kappa	
MPKB-BRI U-BeS	(Malaysia) Abdullah Muhammad	(Malaysia) Tuan Mohd Norhisan	Kronos	Gelumbang Jaya
Selangor United	(Malaysia) Talib Sulaiman	(Malaysia) Zamri Hassan	SkyHawk	dbc Physiotherapy
Perlis	(Malaysia) Manja Man	(Malaysia) Ezzrul Ikmanizar	SkyHawk	
Petaling Jaya Rangers	(Malaysia) Hassan Sazali Waras	(Malaysia) Ronny Harun	Line 7	AirAsia
Shahzan Muda	(Malaysia) Tajuddin Nor	(Malaysia) Wan Muhammad Idham	Fila	
Terengganu City	(Malaysia) Md Noor Derus	(Malaysia) Muslim Yusof	Adidas	TTB, Tulangis Group
Young Fighters	(Malaysia) Omar Ali	(Malaysia) Zawawi Mat Ariff	FiTech	FELDA

== League stages ==
=== League table ===
From this season, only the top two teams from each group qualify for the knockout round.

Group A

Pos	Team	Pld	W	D	L	GF	GA	GD	Pts	Promotion or qualification
1	Selangor United	12	7	2	3	22	13	+9	23	Advance to knock-out stage & Promoted to the Premier League
2	MOF	12	6	4	2	16	10	+6	22	Advance to knock-out stage
3	ATM	12	6	4	2	14	9	+5	22	Transfer to Malaysia M3 League
4	Kuching	12	5	3	4	13	13	0	18	Transfer to Malaysia M3 League
5	Shahzan Muda	12	2	5	5	9	12	−3	11	
6	DBKL	12	3	2	7	10	18	−8	11	
7	MPKB-BRI U-Bes	12	2	2	8	13	21	−8	8	Transfer to Malaysia M3 League

Updated to match(es) played on 29 July 2018. Source: PengurusanBolasepakFAM
Rules for classification: 1) Points; 2) Goal difference; 3) Number of goals scored

Group B^{2}

Pos	Team	Pld	W	D	L	GF	GA	GD	Pts	Promotion or qualification
1	Terengganu City	8	6	0	2	12	7	+5	18	Advance to knock-out stage
2	PJ Rangers	8	4	2	2	17	9	+8	14	Advance to knock-out stage
3	D'AR Wanderers	8	4	0	4	13	16	−3	12	
4	Young Fighters	8	3	1	4	7	8	−1	10	
5	Perlis	8	1	1	6	5	14	−9	4	Promoted to the Premier League
6	Hanelang	0	0	0	0	0	0	0	0	Disqualifed (Note: Marcerra United and Hanelang's results were expunged from the table as a result of the teams' withdrawals from the league on 20 July 2018 and 25 July 2018 respectively.)
7	Marcerra United	0	0	0	0	0	0	0	0	Disqualifed

Updated to match(es) played on 29 July 2018. Source: PengurusanBolasepakFAM
Rules for classification: 1) Points; 2) Goal difference; 3) Number of goals scored

=== Fixtures and results ===
Fixtures and Results of the 2018 Malaysia FAM League season.

Results

==== Group A ====
===== Matchday 1 =====
25 February 2018	DBKL (Kuala Lumpur)	0–1	Selangor United	Kuala Lumpur
20:45 UTC+8		Report	Yusaini Hafiz 9'	Stadium: UM Arena Stadium; Attendance: 150; Referee: Jubik Andangon

25 February 2018	MPKB-BRI U-BeS (Kelantan)	1–2	(Sarawak) Kuching	Kota Bahru
16:45 UTC+8	Faizwan Abdullah 41'	Report	Yazid Ahzhar 38'; Ismail Bujang 67'	Stadium: Sultan Muhammad IV Stadium; Attendance: 400; Referee: Hasrul A.Rahman

25 February 2018	MOF (Putrajaya)	0–0	(Kuala Lumpur) ATM	Bangi
20:45 UTC+8		Report		Stadium: INSPENS Stadium; Attendance: 113; Referee: Khirulazuan Kidam

===== Matchday 2 =====
7 March 2018	Shahzan Muda (Pahang)	2–2	(Putrajaya) MOF	Temerloh, Pahang
20:45 UTC+8	Hilmi Abdullah 69'; Faizal Rani 74'	Report	Afzal Nazri 28'; Fakhrullah Rosli 34'	Stadium: Temerloh Mini Stadium; Attendance: 225; Referee: Jubik Andangon

7 March 2018	Selangor United	2–1	(Kelantan) MPKB-BRI U-BeS	Sabak Bernam, Selangor
16:45 UTC+8	Yusaini Hafiz 6'; Zamri Hassan 88'	Report	Faizwan Abdullah 84'	Stadium: Sungai Besar Mini Stadium; Attendance: 400; Referee: Firdaus Ibrahim

7 March 2018	ATM (Kuala Lumpur)	2–1	(Kuala Lumpur) DBKL	Kuala Lumpur
16:45 UTC+8	Zaironi Yusof 24', 29'	Report	Faqih Ikhwan 21' (o.g.)	Stadium: Mindef Stadium; Attendance: 200; Referee: Razlan Joffri Ali

===== Matchday 3 =====
11 March 2018	Kuching (Sarawak)	2–1	Selangor United	Kuching
16:15 UTC+8	Samsu A Samad 20'; Shahfitri Salim 30'	Report	Yusaini Hafiz 22'	Stadium: Sarawak State Stadium; Attendance: 380; Referee: Zamzaidi Katimin

12 March 2018	DBKL (Kuala Lumpur)	0–1	(Pahang) Shahzan Muda	Kuala Lumpur
16:45 UTC+8		Report	Faizal Rani 44'	Stadium: UM Arena Stadium; Attendance: 200; Referee: Abdul Rahman Wahab

11 March 2018	MPKB-BRI U-BeS (Kelantan)	2–2	(Kuala Lumpur) ATM	Kota Bahru
20:45 UTC+8	Razle Puteh 55'; Masri Asyraf 75'	Report	Suhaimi Yacob 10' (o.g.); Zaironi Yusof 19'	Stadium: Sultan Muhammad IV Stadium; Attendance: 315; Referee: Hamdan Awang

===== Matchday 4 =====
18 March 2018	MOF (Putrajaya)	3–0	(Kuala Lumpur) DBKL	Bangi
20:45 UTC+8	Failee Ghazli 20'; Famirul Asyraf Sayuti 28', 82'	Report		Stadium: INSPENS Stadium; Attendance: 110; Referee: Zamzaidi Katimin

18 March 2018	ATM (Kuala Lumpur)	0–0	(Sarawak) Kuching	Kuala Lumpur
16:45 UTC+8		Report		Stadium: Mindef Stadium; Attendance: 350; Referee: Nasruddin Tamrin

18 March 2018	Shahzan Muda (Pahang)	1–2	(Kelantan) MPKB-BRI U-BeS	Temerloh
20:45 UTC+8	Rizua Shafiqi 26'	Report	Masri Asyraf 1'; Faizwan Abdullah 52'	Stadium: Temerloh Mini Stadium; Attendance: 210; Referee: Rahmat Jantan

===== Matchday 5 =====
1 April 2018	Selangor United	3–1	(Kuala Lumpur) ATM	Sabak Bernam
16:45 UTC+8	Yusaini Hafiz 39'; Thivagar Rajendran 71' (pen.); Syamim 76'	Report	Faiz Ibrahim 19'	Stadium: Sungai Besar Mini Stadium; Attendance: 600; Referee: Faizudin Ismail

1 April 2018	MPKB-BRI U-BeS (Kelantan)	4–1	(Putrajaya) MOF	Kota Bahru
20:45 UTC+8	Masri Asyraf 62', 90+3'; Razlee Puteh 67', 78'	Report	Azmirul Azmi 50'	Stadium: Sultan Muhammad IV Stadium; Attendance: 300; Referee: Mat Zan Abdul Wahab

1 April 2018	Kuching (Sarawak)	1–0	(Pahang) Shahzan Muda	Kuching
16:15 UTC+8	Shahfitri Salim 87'	Report		Stadium: Sarawak State Stadium; Attendance: 529; Referee: Ismail Asib Amin

===== Matchday 6 =====
8 April 2018	DBKL (Kuala Lumpur)	0–0	(Kelantan) MPKB-BRI U-BeS	Kuala Lumpur
20:45 UTC+8		Report		Stadium: UM Arena Stadium; Attendance: 200; Referee: Abang Azharudin Abdullah

8 April 2018	Shahzan Muda (Pahang)	2–2	Selangor United	Temerloh
20:45 UTC+8	Syafiq Razali 13'; Helmi Abdullah 83'	Report	Yusaini Hafiz 61', 90'	Stadium: Temerloh Mini Stadium; Attendance: 220; Referee: Ridzuan Rozali

8 April 2018	MOF (Putrajaya)	1–0	(Sarawak) Kuching	Bangi
20:45 UTC+8	Abdul Manaf Mamat 90+2'	Report		Stadium: Inspens Stadium; Attendance: 110; Referee: Helmi Ali

===== Matchday 7 =====
15 April 2018	ATM (Kuala Lumpur)	1–0	(Pahang) Shahzan Muda	Kuala Lumpur
16:45 UTC+8	Azim Faris 39'	Report		Stadium: Mindef Stadium; Attendance: 300; Referee: Zamzaidi Katimin

15 April 2018	Kuching (Sarawak)	2–2	(Kuala Lumpur) DBKL	Kuching
16:15 UTC+8	Sufizal Ismail 13'; Samsu Alam 80'	Report	Shamirul Rani 10'; Azhar Arbi 87'	Stadium: Sarawak State Stadium; Attendance: 325; Referee: Hashman Hisyam

15 April 2018	Selangor United	1–1	(Putrajaya) MOF	Sabak Bernam
16:45 UTC+8	Yusaini Hafiz 26'	Report	Manaf 20'	Stadium: Sungai Besar Mini Stadium; Attendance: 600; Referee: Azhar Ismail

===== Matchday 8 =====
22 April 2018	Kuching (Sarawak)	2–1	(Kelantan) MPKB-BRI U-BeS	Kuching
16:15 UTC+8	Ismail Bujang 16'; Samsu Alam 45+2'	Report	Masri Asyraf 6'	Stadium: Sarawak State Stadium; Attendance: 325; Referee: Usaid Jamal

23 April 2018	ATM (Kuala Lumpur)	1–0^{3}	(Putrajaya) MOF	Kuala Lumpur
09:00 UTC+8	Faiz Ibrahim 40'	Report		Stadium: Mindef Stadium; Referee: Jeevanathan Ponniamoorthy

22 April 2018	Selangor United	1–2	(Kuala Lumpur) DBKL	Sabak Bernam
16:45 UTC+8	Zamri Hassan 18'	Report	Zakwan Zamri 57'; Muazzin Abdul Khalil 88' (pen.)	Stadium: Sungai Besar Mini Stadium; Attendance: 550; Referee: Jeffri Zulkepli

===== Matchday 9 =====
29 April 2018	MOF (Putrajaya)	0–0	(Pahang) Shahzan Muda	Bangi
20:45 UTC+8		Report		Stadium: Inspens Stadium; Attendance: 95; Referee: Atan Aman

29 April 2018	MPKB-BRI U-BeS (Kelantan)	1–5	Selangor United	Kota Bahru
20:45 UTC+8	Amirul Shafik 10'	Report	Thivagar Rajendran 27' (pen.), 31', 45+2' (pen.), 59'; Yusaini Hafiz 56'	Stadium: Sultan Muhammad IV Stadium; Attendance: 150; Referee: Sukri Abdul Rahman

29 April 2018	DBKL (Kuala Lumpur)	0–3	(Kuala Lumpur) ATM	Kuala Lumpur
20:45 UTC+8		Report	Zaironi Yusof 1'; Rafizol Roslan 62'; Suhairy Johari 90+4'	Stadium: UM Arena Stadium; Attendance: 105; Referee: Amiruddin Lantji

===== Matchday 10 =====
6 May 2018	Selangor United	1–0	(Sarawak) Kuching	Sabak Bernam
16:45 UTC+8	Mohammad Yazid Zaini 78'	Report		Stadium: Sungai Besar Mini Stadium; Attendance: 300; Referee: Jeffri Zulkefli

6 May 2018	Shahzan Muda (Pahang)	1–2	(Kuala Lumpur) DBKL	Temerloh
20:45 UTC+8	Shafiq Razali 78'	Report	Zakwan Zamri 21', 52'	Stadium: Temerloh Mini Stadium; Attendance: 50; Referee: Ismail Asib

11 July 2018	ATM (Kuala Lumpur)	2–1	(Kelantan) MPKB-BRI U-BeS	Kuala Lumpur
16:45 UTC+8	Rafizol Roslan 23', 74'	Report	Razley Puteh 90' (pen.)	Stadium: Mindef Stadium; Attendance: 250; Referee: Abdul Halim Ramlan

===== Matchday 11 =====
13 May 2018	DBKL (Kuala Lumpur)	0–1	(Putrajaya) MOF F.C.	Kuala Lumpur
20:45 UTC+8		Report	Hadi 85' (pen.)	Stadium: UM Arena Stadium; Attendance: 80; Referee: Abdul Halim Ramlan

13 May 2018	Kuching (Sarawak)	0–2	(Kuala Lumpur) ATM	Kuching
16:15 UTC+8		Report	Rafizol Roslan 19'; Venice 75'	Stadium: Sarawak State Stadium; Attendance: 200; Referee: Amir Fakhri

13 May 2018	MPKB-BRI U-BeS (Kelantan)	0–2	(Pahang) Shahzan Muda	Kota Bahru
20:45 UTC+8		Report	Firdaus Anuar 9'; Mohd Aizuddin 90+4'	Stadium: Sultan Muhammad IV Stadium; Attendance: 350; Referee: Hasrul A. Rahman

===== Matchday 12 =====
18 July 2018	ATM (Kuala Lumpur)	0–2	Selangor United	Kuala Lumpur
16:45 UTC+8		Report	Adam See 45+3'; Thivagar Rajendren 90'	Stadium: Mindef Stadium; Attendance: 350; Referee: Nasruddin Tamrin

18 July 2018	MOF (Putrajaya)	2–0	(Kelantan) MPKB BRI-U-BeS	Bangi
20:45 UTC+8	Failee 57'; Afzal Nazri 90+1'	Report		Stadium: Inspens Stadium; Attendance: 120; Referee: Ridzuan Rozali

18 July 2018	Shahzan Muda (Pahang)	1–1	(Sarawak) Kuching	Kota Bahru
20:45 UTC+8	Faizal Rani 90'	Report	Shahfitri Salim 19'	Stadium: Temerloh Mini Stadium; Attendance: 100; Referee: Firdaus Ibrahim

===== Matchday 13 =====
22 July 2018	MPKB-BRI U-BeS (Kelantan)	0–2	(Kuala Lumpur) DBKL	Kota Bahru
20:45 UTC+8		Report	Azhar Arbi 15'; Muazzim Abd Khalil 44'	Stadium: Sultan Muhammad IV Stadium; Attendance: 110; Referee: Hasrul A. Rahman

22 July 2018	Selangor United	1–0	(Pahang) Shahzan Muda	Kota Bahru
16:45 UTC+8	Hilmi Husaini (37o.g.)	Report		Stadium: Sungai Besar Mini Stadium; Attendance: 250; Referee: Jeffri Zolkefli

22 July 2018	Kuching (Sarawak)	0–2	(Putrajaya) MOF	Kuching
16:15 UTC+8		Report	Afzal Nazri 11'; Failee 54'	Stadium: Sarawak State Stadium; Attendance: 285; Referee: Shahrizam Solihim

===== Matchday 14 =====
29 July 2018	Shahzan Muda (Pahang)	0–0	(Kuala Lumpur) ATM	Temerloh
20:45 UTC+8		Report		Stadium: Temerloh Mini Stadium; Attendance: 350; Referee: Amir Fakhri

29 July 2018	DBKL (Kuala Lumpur)	1–3	(Sarawak) Kuching	Kuala Lumpur
20:45 UTC+8	Zakwan Zamri 26'	Report	Rafiezan Razali 2'; Aliff Kepli 32'; Sufizal Ismail 64'	Stadium: UM Arena Stadium; Attendance: 60; Referee: Sarif Tahir

29 July 2018	MOF (Putrajaya)	3–2	Selangor United	Bangi
20:45 UTC+8	Fakhrullah 5', 73'; Failee 61'	Report	Azwan Jatin 54'; Syamim 58'	Stadium: Inspens Stadium; Attendance: 80; Referee: Amiruddin Lantji

==== Group B ====
===== Matchday 1 =====
5 March 2018	Marcerra United (Kuala Lumpur)	2–1	(Selangor) Young Fighters	Nilai
08:45 UTC+8	Syuhiran Zainal 54'; Nabilah Khan 89'	Report	Irzwandi Ismail 26'	Stadium: USIM Stadium; Attendance: 100; Referee: Azham Musa

25 February 2018	D'AR Wanderers (Pahang)	0–2	(Terengganu) Hanelang	Temerloh
20:45 UTC+8		Report	Saiful Nizam 13'; Shahrizal Saad 34'	Stadium: Temerloh Mini Stadium; Attendance: 1000; Referee: Dennis Sayeng

25 February 2018	PJ Rangers (Selangor)	0–0	Perlis	Petaling Jaya
20:45 UTC+8		Report		Stadium: AirAsia Stadium; Attendance: 150; Referee: Ahmad Zuhaidi Dzulkifli

===== Matchday 2 =====
7 March 2018	Terengganu City	3–2	(Selangor) PJ Rangers	Kuala Terengganu
20:45 UTC+8	Hafiszuan Sallehudin 2'; Asyham Asri 8', 55'	Report	Azalinullah Alias 41'; Arif Anwar 71' (pen.)	Stadium: Sultan Ismail Nasiruddin Shah Stadium; Attendance: 110; Referee: Ridwan Abdul Rahman

7 March 2018	Young Fighters	1–0	(Pahang) D'AR Wanderers	Serdang
16:45 UTC+8	Nasyrul Naim 55' (pen.)	Report		Stadium: UPM Mini Stadium; Attendance: 150; Referee: Azham Musa

7 March 2018	Perlis	1–0	Marcerra United	Kangar
20:45 UTC+8	Azrizan Ahmad 83'	Report		Stadium: Tuanku Syed Putra Stadium; Attendance: 1080; Referee: Azwan Marimuthu

===== Matchday 3 =====
11 March 2018	Hanelang (Terengganu)	1–1	Young Fighters	Kuala Berang
16:45 UTC+8	Hasmizan Kamarodin 27'	Report	Irzwandi Ismail 17'	Stadium: Padang Astaka; Attendance: 200; Referee: S. Logeswaran

11 March 2018	Marcerra United	1–2	Terengganu City	Nilai
16:45 UTC+8	Haziq Fikri 79'	Report	Dzaidin Zainuddin 24'; Hafiszuan Sallehuddin 51'	Stadium: USIM Mini Stadium; Attendance: 120; Referee: Ahmad Zuhaidi

11 March 2018	D'AR Wanderers (Pahang)	3–1	Perlis	Temerloh
20:45 UTC+8	Wan Mohd Aliff 53'; Zul Fahmi Awang 68', 74'	Report	NorHamizare Hamid 19'	Stadium: Temerloh Mini Stadium; Attendance: 700; Referee: Khairulsyahmi Ahmad Khalidi

===== Matchday 4 =====
18 March 2018	PJ Rangers (Selangor)	3–0	Marcerra United	Shah Alam
20:45 UTC+8	Tommy Mawat Bada 50'; A. Thamil Arasu 61'; Ronny Harun 72'	Report		Stadium: AirAsia Stadium; Attendance: 120; Referee: Jubik Andangon

18 March 2018	Perlis	3–0	Hanelang	Kangar
20:45 UTC+8	Norhamizaree Hamid 17', 27'; Azrizan Ahmad 37'	Report		Stadium: Tuanku Syed Putra Stadium; Attendance: 1423; Referee: Shaharudin Man

18 March 2018	Terengganu City	3–0	D'AR Wanderers	Kuala Terengganu
20:45 UTC+8	Izzaq Faris Ramlan 48', 52'; Jasmir Mehat 60'	Report		Stadium: Sultan Ismail Nasiruddin Shah Stadium; Attendance: 300; Referee: Ku Alauddin Muhammad

===== Matchday 5 =====
1 April 2018 4	Young Fighters	2–1	Perlis	Nilai, Pahang
16:45 UTC+8	Syafiq Mokhtar 45'; Haziq Rezal 70'	Report	NorHamizaree Hamid 40'	Stadium: USIM Mini Stadium; Attendance: 100; Referee: Hasman Hisam

1 April 2018	D'AR Wanderers (Pahang)	1–5	(Selangor) Petaling Jaya Rangers	Temerloh, Pahang
20:45 UTC+8	Wan Mohd Alif 59'	Report	Tommy Mawat Bada 11'; Raslam Khan 33', 45', 79'; A. Thamil Arasu 55'	Stadium: Temerloh Mini Stadium; Attendance: 600; Referee: Zulkifli Ahmad

1 April 2018	Hanelang (Terengganu)	1–1	Terengganu City	Kuala Berang, Terengganu
16:45 UTC+8	Syafiq Azmi 16'	Report	Solihin Mahammad 62'	Stadium: Padang Astaka Kuala Berang; Attendance: 300; Referee: Almi Abdullah

===== Matchday 6 =====
8 April 2018	Marcerra United	0–4	(Pahang) D'AR Wanderers	Nilai, Pahang
16:45 UTC+8		Report		Stadium: USIM Mini Stadium; Attendance: 80; Referee: Tiong Eng Tai

8 April 2018	Terengganu City	1–0	Young Fighters	Kuala Terengganu
20:45 UTC+8	Jasmir Mehat 14'	Report		Stadium: Sultan Ismail Nasiruddin Shah Stadium; Attendance: 100; Referee: Abdul Faizi Yasin

8 April 2018	Petaling Jaya Rangers	1–0	(Terengganu) Hanelang	Petaling Jaya, Selangor
20:45 UTC+8	A. Thamil Arasu 10'	Report		Stadium: AirAsia Stadium; Attendance: 110; Referee: Nazri Saptu

===== Matchday 7 =====
15 April 2018	Young Fighters	0–1	(Selangor) Petaling Jaya Rangers	Nilai, Negeri Sembilan
16:45 UTC+8		Report	Raslam Khan 71'	Stadium: USIM Mini Stadium; Attendance: 100; Referee: Ridzuan Rozali

15 April 2018	Hanelang	1–1	Marcerra United	Kuala Berang, Terengganu
16:45 UTC+8	Mohd Faizal 37'	Report	Nur Rizzham 22'	Stadium: Padang Astaka; Attendance: 300; Referee: Almi Abdullah

15 April 2018	Perlis	0–1	Terengganu City	Kangar, Perlis
20:45 UTC+8		Report	Khairul Ramadhan 44' (pen.)	Stadium: Tuanku Syed Putra Stadium; Attendance: 879; Referee: Shaharudin Man

===== Matchday 8 =====
21 April 2018	Hanelang	3–0	(Pahang) D'AR Wanderera	Kuala Berang, Terengganu
16:45 UTC+8	Mohamad Hasrolsyawal 54'; Saiful Nizam 79'; Muhammad Asyraf 84'	Report		Stadium: Padang Astaka; Attendance: Zamzaidi Katimin; Referee: 150

22 April 2018	Perlis	1–4	(Selangor) Petaling Jaya Rangers	Kangar, Perlis
20:45 UTC+8	Norhamizaree Hamid 69'	Report	Tommy Mawat Bada 12', 45'; Arif Anwar 54'; Raslam Khan 67'	Stadium: Tuanku Syed Putra Stadium; Attendance: 385; Referee: Azwan Marimuthu

22 April 2018	Young Fighters	0–0	Marcerra United	Nilai, Negeri Sembilan
16:45 UTC+8		Report		Stadium: USIM Mini Stadium; Attendance: 150; Referee: Sarif Tahir

===== Matchday 9 =====
29 April 2018	Petaling Jaya Rangers	1–2	Terengganu City	Petaling Jaya, Selangor
20:45 UTC+8	Raslam Khan 22'	Report	Rusmanizam 6'; Khairul Ramadhan 22'	Stadium: AirAsia Stadium; Attendance: 110; Referee: Zamzaidi Katimin

29 April 2018	D'AR Wanderers	3–1	Young Fighters	Temerloh, Pahang
20:45 UTC+8	Nor Farhan Muhammad 35' (pen.), 71'; Aiman Shakir 70'	Report	Hairil Irwan 57'	Stadium: Temerloh Mini Stadium; Attendance: 180; Referee: Khirulazuan Kidam

29 April 2018	Marcerra United	0–3	Perlis	Nilai, Negeri Sembilan
16:45 UTC+8		Report	Syuhiran Shukur 63'; Azrizan Ahmad 65'; Shahzwan Nordin 83'	Stadium: USIM Mini Stadium; Attendance: 80; Referee: Nasruddin Tamrin

==== Matchday 10 ====
6 May 2018	Young Fighters	1–0	Hanelang	Nilai, Negeri Sembilan
16:45 UTC+8	Muhammad Zulhisyam 63'			Stadium: USIM Mini Stadium

6 May 2018	Terengganu City	2–1	Marcerra United	Kuala Terengganu, Terengganu
20:45 UTC+8	Jasmir Mehat 9'; Rusmanizam Roseland 79'		Haziq Fikri 25'	Stadium: Sultan Ismail Nasiruddin Shah Stadium

6 May 2018	Perlis	1–3	D'AR Wanderers	Kangar, Perlis
20:45 UTC+8	Shahzwan Nordin 31'		Nor Farhan Muhammad 60', 82'; Wan Mohd Aliff 88'	Stadium: Tuanku Syed Putra Stadium

==== Matchday 11 ====
13 May 2018	Marcerra United	0–6	PJ Rangers	Nilai, Negeri Sembilan
16:45 UTC+8			Raslam Khan 15', 48', 59'; A. Thamil Arasu 50', 72'; Tommy Mawat Bada 62'	Stadium: USIM Mini Stadium

13 May 2018	Hanelang	1–1	Perlis	Kuala Berang, Terengganu
16:45 UTC+8	Mohd Firdaus 53'		Haris Safwan Kamal 90+2'	Stadium: Padang Astaka

13 May 2018	D'AR Wanderers	2–1	Terengganu City	Temerloh, Pahang
20:45 UTC+8	Nor Farhan Muhammad 34'; Azrul Azrie 42'		Jasmir Mehat 86'	Stadium: Temerloh Mini Stadium

==== Matchday 12 ====
18 July 2018	Petaling Jaya Rangers	3–1	D'AR Wanderers	Petaling Jaya, Selangor
20:45 UTC+8	Raslam Khan 22', 79', 84'		Nor Farhan Muhammad 74'	Stadium: AirAsia

18 July 2018	Perlis	1–0	Young Fighters	Kangar, Perlis
20:45 UTC+8	Norhamizaref Hamid 22'			Stadium: Tuanku Syed Putra Stadium

==== Matchday 13 ====
22 July 2018	Young Fighters	2–0	Terengganu City	Nilai, Negeri Sembilan
16:45 UTC+8	Syafik Mokhtar 68'; Sukri Jaafar 77'			Stadium: USIM Mini Stadium

==== Matchday 14 ====
29 July 2018	Terengganu City	1–0	Perlis	Kuala Terengganu, Terengganu
20:45 UTC+8	Izzaq Faris Ramlan 6'			Stadium: Sultan Ismail Nasiruddin Shah Stadium

29 July 2018	PJ Rangers	1–1	Young Fighters	Petaling Jaya, Selangor
20:45 UTC+8	Izzaq Ikmal 31'		Irzwandi Zakaria 85'	Stadium: AirAsia Stadium

^{3}22 and 23 April 2018 marked the first time in the season two teams played twice in a twenty-four hour period. Adverse weather conditions halted an afternoon match between ATM FA and MOF F.C. on 22 April. The game resumed at 9 am the following morning, and ATM won 1–0.

== Knock-out stage ==
The teams that won in the semi-final stage will be promoted to the 2019 Malaysia Premier League.

Semi-finals
MOF	2	0	2
Terengganu City	1	1	2
PJ Rangers	1	2	3
Selangor United	2	2	4

Finals
Terengganu City	2
Selangor United	0

=== Semi-finals ===
First Leg

26 August 2018
20:45 UTC+8

MOF	2−1	Terengganu City
Afzal Nazri 13'; Hafizi Amiruddin 70'	Report	Izzaq Faris Ramlan 83'

INSPENS Stadium
Attendance: 550
Referee: Sarif Tahir

Second leg

31 August 2018
20:45 UTC+8

Terengganu City	1−0	MOF
Rahizi Rasib 79'	Report

Sultan Ismail Nasiruddin Shah Stadium
Attendance: 1500
Referee: Khirulazuan Kidam

2−2 on aggregate. Terengganu City won on away goals.

28 August 2018
20:45 UTC+8

PJ Rangers	1−2	Selangor United
A. Thamil Arasu 39' (pen.)	Report	Yusaini Hafiz 52', 63'

AirAsia Stadium
Attendance: 450
Referee: Zohri Tajuddin
31 August 2018
16:15 UTC+8

Selangor United	2−2	PJ Rangers
Mohammad Yazid 60'; Yusaini Hafiz 70'	Report	Shreen Tambi 83'; Tommy Mawat Bada 85'

Sungai Besar Stadium
Attendance: 500
Referee: Fairuzi Mat Desa

Selangor United won 4−3 on aggregate.

=== Finals ===
6 September 2018
20:45 UTC+8

Selangor United	0−2	Terengganu City
	Report	Rahizi Razib 52'; Khairul Ramadhan Zauwawi 72' (pen.)

KLFA Stadium
Attendance: 3000
Referee: Mohd Fusser Mad Sallih

== Season statistics ==
As of matches played on 6 September 2018.

Rank	Player	Club	Goals
1	(Malaysia) Yusaini Hafiz	Selangor United	11
2	(Malaysia) Raslam Khan	Petaling Jaya Rangers	9
3	(Malaysia) Norhamizare Hamid	Perlis	6
3	(Malaysia) R. Thivagar	Selangor United	6
4	(Malaysia) Nor Farhan Muhammad	D'AR Wanderers	5
4	(Malaysia) Masri Asyraf	MPKB-BRI U-BeS	5
4	(Malaysia) Tommy Mawat Bada	Petaling Jaya Rangers	5
8	(Malaysia) A. Thamil Arasu	Petaling Jaya Rangers	4
8	(Malaysia) Razlee Putih	MPKB-BRI U-BeS	4
8	(Malaysia) Afzal Nazri	MOF	4

=== Hat-tricks ===
Player	For	Against	Result	Date
(Malaysia) Raslam Khan	Petaling Jaya Rangers	D'AR Wanderers	1 – 5 (A)	1 April 2018
(Malaysia) R. Thivagar	Selangor United	MPKB-BRI U-Bes	1 – 5 (A)	29 April 2018
(Malaysia) Raslam Khan	Petaling Jaya Rangers	D'AR Wanderers	3 – 1 (H)	18 July 2018

Notes:
(H) – Home; (A) – Away

== See also ==
- 2018 Malaysia Super League
- 2018 Malaysia Premier League
- 2018 Malaysia FA Cup
- 2018 Malaysia Cup
- 2018 Piala Presiden
- 2018 Piala Belia
- List of Malaysian football transfers 2018
