= 2011 Kelantan FA season =

Kelantan
2011 season
- President: Annuar Musa
- Head coach: M. Karathu
- Stadium: Sultan Muhammad IV Stadium (Capacity: 22,000)
- Super League: Champions
- FA Cup: Runners-up
- Malaysia Cup: Quarter-finals
- Charity Shield: Champions
- Top goalscorer: League: Norshahrul Idlan Talaha (18); All: Norshahrul Idlan Talaha (25)
Home colours	Away colours

The 2011 season was Kelantan's 3rd season in the Malaysia Super League. Kelantan were defending Malaysia Cup champions, and aimed for 2nd cup this season. In addition, they were competing in the domestic tournaments, the FA Cup and the Malaysia Cup.

== Competitions ==
Win Draw Loss Postponed

=== Overview ===
Competition	Record							
Competition	Pld	W	D	L	GF	GA	GD	Win %
Super League	26	17	5	4	50	21	+29	65.38
FA Cup	7	4	2	1	14	7	+7	57.14
Malaysia Cup	8	4	2	2	14	9	+5	50.00
Charity Shield	1	1	0	0	2	0	+2	100.00
Total	42	26	9	7	80	37	+43	61.90

Source: Competitions

=== Charity Shield ===
The Sultan Haji Ahmad Shah Cup, more popularly known as Piala Sumbangsih (Charity Shield), is an annual soccer match currently contested by the current Malaysia Cup winner and the current Super League Malaysia winner.

29 January 2011 Charity Shield	Selangor	0–2	Kelantan	Shah Alam Stadium
		Match Report	Norshahrul 8' (pen.); Badhri Radzi 73'	Attendance: 35,000

=== Super League ===
==== Results summary ====
Overall								Home						Away					
Pld	W	D	L	GF	GA	GD	Pts	W	D	L	GF	GA	GD	W	D	L	GF	GA	GD
26	17	5	4	50	21	+29	56	10	2	1	26	5	+21	7	3	3	24	16	+8

Last updated: 26 May 2013.

29 January 2011 Charity Shield	Selangor	0–2	Kelantan	Shah Alam Stadium
		Match Report	Norshahrul 8' (pen.); Badhri Radzi 73'	Attendance: 35,000

1 February 2011 MSL	Kelantan	1–1	Terengganu	Sultan Muhammad IV Stadium
	Badhri Radzi 36'	Match Report	Marzuki Yusof 68'

12 February 2011 MSL	Kelantan	2–1	Johor FC	Sultan Muhammad IV Stadium
	Azwan Roya 29'; Norshahrul 49', 72'	Match Report	Riduwan Maon 25'

15 February 2011 MSL	Kuala Lumpur	0–2	Kelantan	KLFA Stadium
		Match Report	Ramzul Zahini 46'; Norshahrul 86'

25 February 2011 MSL	Kedah	1–1	Kelantan	Darul Aman Stadium
	Azlan Ismail 57'	Match Report	Norshahrul 79'

1 March 2011 MSL	Kelantan	3–0	Negeri Sembilan	Sultan Muhammad IV Stadium
	S. Chanturu 48'; Norshahrul 74', 79'	Match Report

12 March 2011 MSL	Pahang	2–0	Kelantan	Darulmakmur Stadium
	R. Surendran 44'; Faizol Hussien 90'	Match Report

1 April 2011 MSL	Kelantan	2–1	Harimau Muda	Sultan Muhammad IV Stadium
	Solehin Kanasian 11'; S. Chanturu 24'	Match Report	Irfan Fazail 44'

5 April 2011 MSL	T-Team	4–3	Kelantan	Sultan Ismail Nasiruddin Shah Stadium
	Zairo Anuar 29'; Mohd Nor Farhan Muhammad 45'; Indra Putra 51'; Haris Safwan 79'	Match Report	Danial Fadzly 62', 86'; S. Chanturu 65'

9 April 2011 MSL	Kelantan	6–0	Felda United	Sultan Muhammad IV Stadium
	Shakir Shaari 33'; Norshahrul 43'; Nizad Ayub 60', 70'; Danial Fadzly 83'; Izuan Salahuddin 89'	Match Report

12 April 2011 MSL	Perak	4–0	Kelantan	Perak Stadium
	Fazrul Hazli 5'; Shafiq Jamal 26'; Akmal Rizal 79'; Razali Umar 82'	Match Report

16 April 2011 MSL	Kelantan	0–0	Sabah	Sultan Muhammad IV Stadium
		Match Report

19 April 2011 MSL	Perlis	1–5	Kelantan	Utama Negeri Stadium
	Faiz Subri 12'	Match Report	Norshahrul 7', 44'; Badhri Radzi 47', 67', 78'

22 April 2011 MSL	Kelantan	4–0	Perlis	Sultan Muhammad IV Stadium
	Izuan Salahuddin 40'; Norshahrul 50'; Nizad Ayub 68'; Badhri Radzi 73'	Match Report

26 April 2011 MSL	Kelantan	1–0	Selangor	Sultan Muhammad IV Stadium
	Norshahrul 4'	Match Report

30 April 2011 MSL	Kelantan	2–0	Kuala Lumpur	Sultan Muhammad IV Stadium
	Badhri Radzi 24'; S. Chanturu 79'	Match Report

3 May 2011 MSL	Johor FC	0–1	Kelantan	Pasir Gudang Corporation Stadium
		Match Report	Badhri Radzi 41'

6 May 2011 MSL	Kelantan	2–0	Kedah	Sultan Muhammad IV Stadium
	Khalid Jamlus 53'; S. Chanturu 66'	Match Report

10 May 2011 MSL	Negeri Sembilan	0–0	Kelantan	Tuanku Abdul Rahman Stadium
		Match Report

19 May 2011 MSL	Felda United	1–3	Kelantan	KLFA Stadium
	Hasmarul Fadzir 85'	Match Report	Badhri Radzi 30'; Rashid Mahmud 46' (o.g.); Norshahrul 90'

22 May 2011 MSL	Harimau Muda	2–2	Kelantan	Shah Alam Stadium
	Izzaq Faris 14', 70'	Match Report	S. Chanturu 31'; Norshahrul 86'

25 May 2011 MSL	Kelantan	1–2	T-Team	Sultan Muhammad IV Stadium
	Nurul Azwan 85'	Match Report	Badrul Hisani 45'; Indra Putra 90'

28 May 2011 MSL	Kelantan	1–0	Pahang	Sultan Muhammad IV Stadium
	Badhri Radzi 8'	Match Report

6 June 2011 MSL	Terengganu	0–3	Kelantan	Sultan Ismail Nasiruddin Shah Stadium
		Match Report	Izuan Salahuddin 8'; Norshahrul 72', 90'

14 June 2011 MSL	Kelantan	1–0	Perak	Sultan Muhammad IV Stadium
	Badhri Radzi 8'	Match Report

6 July 2011 MSL	Sabah	1–2	Kelantan	Likas Stadium
	Razlan Oto 76'	Match Report	Norshahrul 6', 71'

=== FA Cup ===
18 February 2011 First Round	T-Team	1–1; 5-6 (p)	Kelantan	Sultan Ismail Nasiruddin Shah Stadium
	Indra Putra 61'; Indra Putra (penalty scored); Khairul Ezwan (penalty scored); Haris Safwan (penalty scored); Badrul Hisani (penalty scored); Shamsul kamal (penalty scored); Norfazly (penalty missed)	Match Report	Rizal Fahmi 52'; (penalty scored) Norshahrul; (penalty scored) Rizal Fahmi; (penalty scored) Azwan roya (penalty scored) Shakir; (penalty scored) Daudsu; (penalty scored) Danial fadzly	Attendance: 18,000

4 March 2011 Second Round	Johor FC	0–1	Kelantan	Pasir Gudang Corporation Stadium
		Match Report	Badhri Radzi 10'	Attendance: 1,000

15 March 2011 Quarter Final 1	Kelantan	2–2	Felda United	Sultan Muhammad IV Stadium
	Badhri Radzi 45'; Norshahrul 70'	Match Report	Zamri Chin 31'; Liew Kit Kong 90' (pen.)

19 March 2011 Quarter Final 2	Felda United	0–3	Kelantan	KLFA Stadium
		Match Report	S. Chanturu 8'; Nurul Azwan 66'; Nizad Ayub 88'

- Kelantan won on aggregate 5–2.

30 March 2011 Semi Final 1	Selangor	1–5	Kelantan	Shah Alam Stadium
	Amri Yahyah 90'	Match Report	Ramzul Zahini 10', 40'; Badhri Radzi 43'; Nurul Azwan 67'; Norshahrul 71'

30 February 2011 Semi Final 2	Kelantan	1–1	Selangor	Sultan Muhammad IV Stadium
	Shakir Shaari 9'	Match Report	Rudie Ramli 78'

- Kelantan won on aggregate 6–2.

11 June 2011 Final	Terengganu	2–1 (a.e.t.)	Kelantan	National Stadium, Bukit Jalil
	Daudsu Jamaluddin 69' (o.g.); Ahmad Nordin Alias 110'	Match Report	Nurul Azwan 79'	Attendance: 87,500; Referee: Subkhiddin Mohd Salleh

=== Malaysia Cup ===
6 September 2011 Group Stage	Sarawak	0–2	Kelantan	Sarawak Stadium
		Match Report	Norshahrul 64'; S. Chanturu 85'	Attendance: 20,000

10 September 2011 Group Stage	Kelantan	2–1	Johor FC	Sultan Muhammad IV Stadium
	Shakir Shaari 26'; Ramzul Zahini 88'	Match Report	Eddy Helmi 11'

14 September 2011 Group Stage	Felda United	2–0	Kelantan	MPS Stadium
	Farderin Kadir 27'; D. Saarvindran 67'	Match Report

18 September 2011 Group Stage	Kelantan	4–0	Sarawak	Sultan Muhammad IV Stadium
	Badhri Radzi 80', 90'; Norshahrul 87'; Danial Fadzly 88'	Match Report

24 September 2011 Group Stage	Johor FC	1–1	Kelantan	JCorp Stadium
	Nizam Abu Bakar 2'	Match Report	Azamuddin Akil 8'

27 September 2011 Group Stage	Kelantan	2–0	Johor FC	Sultan Muhammad IV Stadium
	Norshahrul 62', 71'	Match Report

10 October 2011 Quarter Final 1	Terengganu	3–1	Kelantan	Sultan Ismail Nasiruddin Shah Stadium
	Ismail Faruqi 45'; Manaf Mamat 89'; Marzuki Yusof 90'	Match Report	Badhri Radzi 80' (pen.)

14 October 2011 Quarter Final 2	Kelantan	2–2	Terengganu	Sultan Muhammad IV Stadium
	Azamuddin Akil 55'; Badhri Radzi 70' (pen.)	Match Report	Ashaari Shamsuddin 19', 40'

* Kelantan lost on aggregate 3–5.

=== Group C ===
Team	Pld	W	D	L	GF	GA	GD	Pts
Kelantan FA	6	4	1	1	11	4	+7	13
(Kuala Lumpur) Felda United FC	6	3	1	2	6	4	+2	10
Johor FC	6	2	2	2	7	1	+6	8
Sarawak FA	6	1	0	5	2	11	−9	3

== Team officials ==
Position	Name
President	(Malaysia) (Kelantan) Annuar Musa
General Manager / Team Manager	(Malaysia) (Kelantan) Azman Ibrahim
Media Officer	(Malaysia) (Kelantan) Wan Badri Wan Omar
Head Coach	(Malaysia) (Perak) M. Karathu
Assistant Head Coach	(Malaysia) (Kelantan) Hashim Mustapha
Assistant Head Coach	(Malaysia) (Kelantan) Sideek Shamsuddin
Goalkeeping Coach	(Malaysia) (Kelantan) Ismail Chawalit Abu Bakar
Fitness Coach	(Malaysia) Reuven Jude Balraj
Physiotherapist	(Malaysia) Syarizan Samsuddin
Kit man / Equipment	(Malaysia) Harun Ismail

== Player statistics ==
=== Squad ===
Last updated 23 May 2013

Key: = Appearances, = Goals, = Yellow card, (red card) = Red card

Number	Nation/State	Position	Name	Total				League				FA Cup				Malaysia Cup			
Number	Nation/State	Position	Name		Goal	Booked	Sent off (straight red)		Goal	Booked	Sent off (straight red)		Goal	Booked	Sent off (straight red)		Goal	Booked	Sent off (straight red)
1	(Malaysia) (Kelantan)	GK	Mohd Shahrizan Ismail		0				0				0				0		
2	(Malaysia) (Kelantan)	DF	Wan Rohaimi Wan Ismail		0				0				0				0		
3	(Malaysia) (Kuala Lumpur)	RB	Subramaniam Sooryapparad		0				0				0				0		
4	(Malaysia) (Kuala Lumpur)	RW/LW	Zul Yusri Che Harun		0				0				0				0		
5	(Malaysia) (Kelantan)	DM	Khairan Eroza Razali		0				0				0				0		
6	(Malaysia) (Kelantan)	RB	Mohd Farisham Ismail		0			25	0				0				0		
7	(Malaysia) (Kelantan)	FW	Mohd Nizad Ayub		4				3				1				0		
8	(Malaysia) (United States)	DM	Wan Kuzain		3				1				1				1		
9	(Malaysia) (Terengganu)	FW	Norshahrul Idlan Talaha		24				18				2				4		
10	(Malaysia) (Kedah)	MF	Solehin Kanasian Abdullah		1				1				0				0		
11	(Malaysia) (Kedah)	MF	Danial Fadzly Abdullah		4				3				0				1		
12	(Malaysia) (Kelantan)	RM	Mohd Nurul Azwan Roya		5				2				3				0		
13	(Malaysia) (Kelantan)	CB/RB	Mohammad Abdul Aziz Ismail		0				0				0				0		
14	(Malaysia) (Kuala Lumpur)	DF	Nicholas Chan		0				0				0				0		
15	(Malaysia) (Kelantan)	RB	Mohd Daudsu Jamaluddin		0				0				0				0		
16	(Malaysia) (Kelantan)	CM	Mohd Badhri Mohd Radzi		18			24	10				3				4		
17	(Malaysia) (Kelantan)	CB	Mohd Rizal Fahmi Abdul Rosid		1				0				1				0		
18	(Malaysia) (Kelantan)	MF	Wan Zaman Wan Mustapha		0				0				0				0		
19	(Malaysia) (Kelantan)	GK	Khairul Fahmi Che Mat	41	0			24	0			7	0			10	0		
20	(Malaysia) (Kelantan)	GK	Norhadi Ubaidillah		0				0				0				0		
21	(Malaysia) (Kelantan)	DM	Khairan Ezuan Razali		0				0				0				0		
22	(Malaysia) (Kelantan)	FW	Mohd Ramzul Zahini Adnan		4				1				2				1		
23	(Malaysia) (Kedah)	RW/LW	Suppiah Chanturu		8				6				1				1		
24	(Malaysia) (Kelantan)	LB	Zairul Fitree Ishak		0				0				0				0		
25	(Malaysia) (Kuala Lumpur)	FW	Muhamad Khalid Jamlus		1				1				0				0		
26	(Malaysia) (Kelantan)	MF	Muhd Izuan Salahuddin		3				3				0				0		
27	(Malaysia) (Kelantan)	LB	Mohd Zamri Ramli		0				0				0				0		
28	(Malaysia) (Pahang)	FW	Mohd Azamuddin Md Akil*		2				-				-				2		

* On loan from Pahang for Malaysia Cup campaign.

=== Goalscorers ===
Rnk	No.	Player	Pos.	Super League	FA Cup	Malaysia Cup	Charity Shield	Total
1	9	Norshahrul Idlan Talaha	FW	18	2	4	1	24*
2	16	Mohd Badhri Mohd Radzi	MF	11	3	4	1	19
3	23	Suppiah Chanturu	MF	5	1	1	0	7
4	12	Nurul Azwan Roya	MF	2	3	0	0	5
5	7	Mohd Nizad Ayub	FW	3	1	0	0	4
5	22	Mohd Ramzul Zahini	FW	1	2	1	0	4
5	11	Danial Fadzly Abdullah	MF	3	0	1	0	4
8	8	Mohd Shakir Shaari	MF	1	1	1	0	3
8	26	Muhd Izuan Salahuddin	MF	3	0	0	0	3
10	28	Mohd Azamuddin Md Akil	FW	0	0	2	0	2
11	17	Rizal Fahmi Rosid	DF	0	1	0	0	1
11	10	Solehin Kanasian	MF	1	0	0	0	1
11	25	Muhamad Khalid Jamlus	FW	1	0	0	0	1
TOTALS				50	14	14	2	80

== Transfers ==
All start dates are pending confirmation.

=== In ===
Pos.	Name	From	Fee
DF	(Malaysia) (Kelantan) Aziz Ismail	(Malaysia) (Kuala Lumpur) KL PLUS	
DF	(Malaysia) (Kelantan) Wan Rohaimi Wan Ismail	(Malaysia) Johor FC	
DF	(Malaysia) (Kuala Lumpur) Nicholas Chan	(Malaysia) Kelantan President's Cup Team	
MF	(Malaysia) (Kedah) Solehin Kanasian Abdullah	(Malaysia) Perlis	
MF	(Malaysia) (Kelantan) Mohd Nurul Azwan Roya	(Malaysia) Johor FC	
MF	(Malaysia) (Kedah) Danial Fadzly Abdullah	(Malaysia) (Kuala Lumpur) ATM	
MF	(Malaysia) (Kelantan) Khairan Ezuan Razali	(Malaysia) (Kuala Lumpur) KL PLUS	
FW	(Malaysia) (Kuala Lumpur) Muhamad Khalid Jamlus	(Malaysia) (Kuala Lumpur) ATM	

=== Out ===
Pos.	Name	To	Fee
DF	(Malaysia) (Perlis) Azizi Matt Rose	(Malaysia) (Terengganu) T-Team	
MF	(Malaysia) (Perak) Indra Putra Mahayuddin	(Malaysia) (Terengganu) T-Team	
MF	(Malaysia) (Terengganu) Mohd Nor Farhan Muhammad	(Malaysia) (Terengganu) T-Team	
MF	(Malaysia) (Terengganu) Hairuddin Omar	(Malaysia) Negeri Sembilan	
FW	(Malaysia) (Kedah) Akmal Rizal Ahmad Rakhli	(Malaysia) Perak	

=== Loans in ===
Pos.	Name	To	Fee
FW	(Malaysia) (Pahang) Mohd Azamuddin Md Akil	(Malaysia) Pahang	

=== Loans out ===
Pos.	Name	To	Fee
GK	(England) (Selangor) Syed Adney Syed Husain	(Malaysia) Sabah	

== See also ==
- List of Kelantan FA seasons
