= List of Malaysian football transfers 2018 =

This is a list of Malaysian football transfers for the 2018 first transfer window. Moves featuring Malaysia Super League, Malaysia Premier League and Malaysia FAM Cup club are listed.

The first transfer window began once clubs had concluded their final domestic fixture of the 2017 season, but many transfers will only officially go through on 1 December onwards because the majority of player contracts finish on 31 October.

The window opened on 20 November 2017 and closed on 11 February 2018.

== 2018 first transfers ==
All clubs without a flag are Malaysian. Otherwise it will be stated.

=== Transfers ===
| Date (Note: Transfer dates are gathered from the various and may not be exact) | Name | Moving from | Moving to | Fee (Note: Transfer fees are gathered from the various and may not be exact) |
|---|---|---|---|---|
| 29 August 2017 | (England) Brandon Adams | Perlis | (England) Queens Park Rangers | Loan return |
| 5 November 2017 | (Malaysia) Jafri Firdaus Chew | Penang | PKNS | Free |
| 8 November 2017 | (Malaysia) Wan Azraie | Pahang | Terengganu | Free |
| 9 November 2017 | (Denmark) Ken Ilsø | Kedah | Penang | Free |
| 9 November 2017 | (Australia) Zac Anderson | Kedah | PKNS | Free |
| 9 November 2017 | (Mali) Modibo Konté | Perlis | Kuala Lumpur (Note: Konté's loan spell was terminated and his contract with Kuala Lumpur has not been extended.) | Loan return |
| 10 November 2017 | (Malaysia) Saiful Nizam | Pahang | Kuala Lumpur | Free |
| 10 November 2017 | (South Korea) Heo Jae-won | Pahang | Unattached | N/A |
| 10 November 2017 | (Malaysia) Nordin Alias | Pahang | Unattached | N/A |
| 10 November 2017 | (Malaysia) Remezey Che Ros | Kuala Lumpur | Pahang | N/A |
| 10 November 2017 | (Malaysia) Naufal Naim Tony Rosdin | Kuala Lumpur | Unattached | N/A |
| 10 November 2017 | (Malaysia) Syazmin Firdaus | Kuala Lumpur | Unattached | N/A |
| 10 November 2017 | (Argentina) Nicolas Dul | Kuala Lumpur | Unattached | N/A |
| 10 November 2017 | (Cameroon) Yannick N'Djeng | T-Team | Unattached | N/A |
| 10 November 2017 | (Mali) Mamadou Samassa | T-Team | Unattached | N/A |
| 10 November 2017 | (Malaysia) Hafidz Romly | T-Team | Unattached | N/A |
| 10 November 2017 | (Malaysia) Ooi Shee Keong | T-Team | Unattached | N/A |
| 10 November 2017 | (Malaysia) Ramzul Zahini | T-Team | Unattached | N/A |
| 10 November 2017 | (Malaysia) Azrul Hazran | T-Team | Unattached | N/A |
| 10 November 2017 | (Malaysia) Amierul Hakimi | Terengganu | T-Team | N/A |
| 11 November 2017 | (Malaysia) Daudsu Jamaluddin | Kelantan | Marcerra United | Free |
| 11 November 2017 | (Malaysia) Hasmizan Kamarodin | Kelantan | Terengganu City | Free |
| 11 November 2017 | (Malaysia) Syihan Hazmi | Kelantan | Negeri Sembilan | Free |
| 11 November 2017 | (Malaysia) Norhafiz Zamani | Kelantan | Penang | Free |
| 11 November 2017 | (Malaysia) S. Subramaniam | Kelantan | MIFA | Free |
| 11 November 2017 | (Malaysia) Aziz Ismail | Kelantan | Unattached | N/A |
| 11 November 2017 | (Malaysia) Zairul Fitree | Kelantan | Kuantan | Free |
| 11 November 2017 | (Malaysia) Khairul Izuan | Kelantan | Negeri Sembilan | Free |
| 11 November 2017 | (Malaysia) S. Thinagaran | Kelantan | Unattached | N/A |
| 11 November 2017 | (Lebanon) Abou Bakr Al-Mel | Kelantan | (Lebanon) Tripoli SC | Undisclosed |
| 11 November 2017 | (The Gambia) Mamadou Danso | Kelantan | Unattached | N/A |
| 11 November 2017 | (Brazil) Alessandro Celin | Kelantan | Unattached | N/A |
| 11 November 2017 | (Malaysia) Imran Samso | Kelantan youth | Kelantan | Promoted |
| 11 November 2017 | (Malaysia) Nik Akif Syahiran | Kelantan youth | Kelantan | Promoted |
| 11 November 2017 | (Malaysia) Syaiful Alias | Kelantan youth | Kelantan | Promoted |
| 11 November 2017 | (Croatia) Marko Šimić | Melaka United | (Indonesia) Persija Jakarta | Free |
| 11 November 2017 | (Brazil) Felipe Almeida | Melaka United | Unattached | N/A |
| 11 November 2017 | (North Macedonia) Jasmin Mecinović | Melaka United | Unattached | N/A |
| 13 November 2017 | (Malaysia) G. Jeevananthan | PKNS | Unattached | N/A |
| 13 November 2017 | (South Korea) Park Kwang-il | PKNS | Unattached | N/A |
| 13 November 2017 | (Liberia) Patrick Wleh | PKNS | Unattached | N/A |
| 13 November 2017 | (Malaysia) Munir Amran | PKNS | Unattached | N/A |
| 13 November 2017 | (Malaysia) P. Rajesh | PKNS | Unattached | N/A |
| 13 November 2017 | (The Gambia) Abdou Jammeh | PKNS | Unattached | N/A |
| 13 November 2017 | (Malaysia) Fauzan Dzulkifli | PKNS | Unattached | N/A |
| 13 November 2017 | (Malaysia) Bobby Gonzales | PKNS | Unattached | N/A |
| 13 November 2017 | (Malaysia) Abdul Ghani Rahman | PKNS | Unattached | N/A |
| 13 November 2017 | (Malaysia) Khairul Ramadhan | PKNS | Unattached | N/A |
| 13 November 2017 | (Malaysia) Affize Faisal | PKNS | Unattached | N/A |
| 13 November 2017 | (Portugal) Fábio Ferreira | PKNS | Unattached | N/A |
| 13 November 2017 | (Malaysia) Nor Haziq Aris | PKNS | Unattached | N/A |
| 13 November 2017 | (Malaysia) Amirizdwan Taj | PKNS | Kelantan | Free |
| 14 November 2017 | (Malaysia) Zamir Selamat | PKNS | Melaka United | Free |
| 14 November 2017 | (Malaysia) Faridzuen Kamaruddin | Sime Darby | Melaka United | Free |
| 15 November 2017 | (Indonesia) Ilham Armaiyn | (Indonesia) Bhayangkara | Selangor | Undisclosed |
| 15 November 2017 | (Indonesia) Evan Dimas | (Indonesia) Bhayangkara | Selangor | Undisclosed |
| 16 November 2017 | (Malaysia) Azmi Muslim | PKNS | Melaka United | Free |
| 16 November 2017 | (England) Lee Tuck | Negeri Sembilan | Terengganu | Free |
| 17 November 2017 | (Malaysia) Fitri Omar | Kedah | Terengganu | Free |
| 17 November 2017 | (Malaysia) Syazuan Hazani | Kedah | Petaling Jaya Rangers | Free |
| 17 November 2017 | (Malaysia) Raslam Khan | UiTM | Petaling Jaya Rangers | Free |
| 18 November 2017 | (Malaysia) Adam Nor Azlin | Selangor | Johor Darul Ta'zim | Free |
| 18 November 2017 | (Malaysia) Syamer Kutty Abba | Penang | Johor Darul Ta'zim | Free |
| 18 November 2017 | (Malaysia) Rizal Fahmi Rosid | Selangor | Negeri Sembilan | N/A |
| 19 November 2017 | (Malaysia) Fauzi Abdul Kadar | T-Team | Terengganu | Free |
| 19 November 2017 | (Singapore) Safuwan Baharudin | PDRM | Pahang | Free |
| 19 November 2017 | (Malaysia) Norshahrul Idlan | Felda United | Pahang | Free |
| 20 November 2017 | (Argentina) Pereyra Díaz | (Mexico) Club León | Johor Darul Ta'zim | Loan return |
| 20 November 2017 | (Malaysia) Joseph Kalang Tie | Pahang | Selangor | Free |
| 20 November 2017 | (Malaysia) S.Vishnu Ruban Nair | Felcra | Petaling Jaya Rangers | Free |
| 20 November 2017 | (Malaysia) Arif Anwar | Kuala Lumpur | Petaling Jaya Rangers | Free |
| 20 November 2017 | (Argentina) Gonzalo Cabrera | Johor Darul Ta'zim | Unattached | N/A |
| 20 November 2017 | (Argentina) Gabriel Guerra | Johor Darul Ta'zim | Unattached | N/A |
| 20 November 2017 | (Malaysia) Shazlan Alias | Negeri Sembilan | Melaka United | Free |
| 20 November 2017 | (Malaysia) Azrul Ahmad | Penang | Melaka United | Free |
| 21 November 2017 | (Malaysia) S. Chanturu | Johor Darul Ta'zim | Melaka United | Free |
| 21 November 2017 | (Malaysia) R. Gopinathan | Johor Darul Ta'zim | Melaka United | Free |
| 23 December 2017 | (Liberia) Zah Rahan Krangar | Felda United | (Indonesia) Bhayangkara | Free |
| 21 November 2017 | (Malaysia) Malik Ariff | Kuantan | Terengganu | Free |
| 21 November 2017 | (South Korea) Kim Hyun-woo | PKNP | Terengganu | Free |
| 21 December 2017 | (Malaysia) Farderin Kadir | PKNS | Melaka United (Note: Farderin previously was loaned to Negeri Sembilan his contract with PKNS has not been extended, he signed with Melaka United.) | Free |
| 22 November 2017 | (Malaysia) S. Veenod | Selangor | Kelantan | Free |
| 23 November 2017 | (South Korea) Do Dong-hyun | UiTM | Kelantan | Free |
| 24 November 2017 | (Canada) La'Vere Corbin-Ong | (Netherlands) Go Ahead Eagles | Johor Darul Ta'zim | Free |
| 24 November 2017 | (Malaysia) Wan Ahmad Amirzafran | T-Team | Terengganu | Free |
| 24 November 2017 | (Malaysia) Kamal Azizi Zabri | T-Team | Terengganu | Free |
| 24 November 2017 | (Malaysia) Ahmad Fakri Saarani | Kedah | Melaka United | Free |
| 24 November 2017 | (Malaysia) Wan Ahmad Amirzafran | T-Team | Terengganu | Free |
| 24 November 2017 | (Malaysia) Kamal Azizi | T-Team | Terengganu | Free |
| 1 December 2017 | (Malaysia) Sabre Abu | Negeri Sembilan | PKNS (Note: Sabre's loan spell was terminated and his contract with PKNS has not been extended.) | Loan return |
| 1 December 2017 | (Malaysia) R. Thivagar | PBMS | PKNS (Note: Thivagar's loan spell was terminated and his contract with PKNS has not been extended.) | Loan return |
| 1 December 2017 | (Malaysia) Adam Shafiq Fua'ad | PBMS | PKNS (Note: Adam's loan spell was terminated and his contract with PKNS has not been extended.) | Loan return |
| 1 December 2017 | (Malaysia) Shakir Ali | PDRM | PKNS (Note: Shakir's loan spell was terminated and his contract with PKNS has not been extended.) | Loan return |
| 1 December 2017 | (Malaysia) Shahurain Abu Samah | PDRM | PKNS (Note: Shahurain's loan spell was terminated and his contract with PKNS has not been extended.) | Loan return |
| 1 December 2017 | (Malaysia) Nik Shahrul Azim | Negeri Sembilan | Kelantan | Loan return |
| 1 December 2017 | (Malaysia) Nasharizam Rashid | Perlis | Kelantan | Loan return |
| 1 December 2017 | (Malaysia) Amir Zikri | Perlis | Kelantan | Loan return |
| 1 December 2017 | (Malaysia) Syafiq Rahman | Perlis | Kelantan | Loan return |
| 1 December 2017 | (Malaysia) Shahrul Hakim | MIFA | Kelantan | Loan return |
| 1 December 2017 | (Malaysia) Fakhrul Zaman | MIFA | Kelantan | Loan return |
| 1 December 2017 | (Malaysia) Nicholas Swirad | Melaka United | Johor Darul Ta'zim II | Loan return |
| 1 December 2017 | (Malaysia) Azniee Taib | Melaka United | Johor Darul Ta'zim II | Loan return |
| 1 December 2017 | (Malaysia) Nurshamil Abd Ghani | Selangor | Melaka United | Loan return |
| 1 December 2017 | (Malaysia) Abdul Thaufiq Abdul Haq | SAMB | Melaka United | Loan return |
| 1 December 2017 | (Malaysia) Alif Shamsudin | Felcra | Melaka United | Loan return |
| 1 December 2017 | (Malaysia) Akmal Ishak | Petaling Jaya Rangers | Melaka United | Loan return |
| 1 December 2017 | (Malaysia) Tam Sheang Tsung | Kuala Lumpur | Melaka United | Loan return |
| 1 December 2017 | (Malaysia) Nicholas Swirad | Johor Darul Ta'zim II | Melaka United | Free |
| 1 December 2017 | (Malaysia) Ezad Ariff Jamaludin | MIFA | Negeri Sembilan | Loan return |
| 1 December 2017 | (Malaysia) Thanabalan Nadarajah | Felcra | Negeri Sembilan | Loan return |
| 1 December 2017 | (Malaysia) Rahizi Rasib | Felcra | Negeri Sembilan | Loan return |
| 1 December 2017 | (Malaysia) Raffi Nagoorgani | PKNP | Perak | Loan return |
| 1 December 2017 | (Malaysia) Hafiz Ramdan (Note: Hafiz's loan spell was terminated, he signed with PKNP permanently) | PKNP | Perak | Loan return |
| 1 December 2017 | (Brazil) Gilberto Fortunato | PKNP | Felda United | Free |
| 1 December 2017 | (Malaysia) Ridzuan Azly Hussham | UiTM | Perak | Loan return |
| 1 December 2017 | (Malaysia) Adib Zainudin | Felcra | UiTM | Loan return |
| 1 December 2017 | (Malaysia) Tommy Mawat | Sarawak | Petaling Jaya Rangers | Free |
| 1 December 2017 | (Malaysia) Shamie Iszuan | Sarawak | Petaling Jaya Rangers | Free |
| 1 December 2017 | (Malaysia) Shreen Tambi | Sarawak | Petaling Jaya Rangers | Free |
| 1 December 2017 | (Malaysia) Syazwan Zaipol | PKNP | Perak | Free |
| 1 December 2017 | (Netherlands) Vincent Lucas | PKNP | Unattached | N/A |
| 1 December 2017 | (Malaysia) Shahrul Aizad | Kuantan | Terengganu | Free |
| 1 December 2017 | (Cambodia) Thierry Bin | (Thailand) Krabi | Terengganu | Undisclosed |
| 1 December 2017 | (Montenegro) Igor Zonjić | (Serbia) FK Rad | Terengganu | Undisclosed |
| 2 December 2017 | (Malaysia) Qayyum Marjoni | Kelantan | PKNS | Free |
| 2 December 2017 | (Malaysia) Annas Rahmat | Negeri Sembilan | PKNS | Free |
| 2 December 2017 | (Malaysia) Shahril Saa'ri | Sarawak | PKNS | Free |
| 2 December 2017 | (Malaysia) Zarif Irfan | Selangor | PKNS | Free |
| 2 December 2017 | (Malaysia) K. Reuben | Penang | PKNS | Free |
| 2 December 2017 | (Malaysia) Faizat Ghazli | Penang | PKNS | Free |
| 2 December 2017 | (Malaysia) Syamim Yahya | Pahang | Felda United | Free |
| 2 December 2017 | (Malaysia) D. Christie Jayaseelan | Pahang | Felda United | Undisclosed |
| 2 December 2017 | (Malaysia) Azreen Zulkafali | PKNS | Felda United | Free |
| 2 December 2017 | (Malaysia) Khairu Azrin | PKNS | Felda United | Free |
| 2 December 2017 | (Brazil) Thiago Junio | Perak | Felda United | Free |
| 2 December 2017 | (Malaysia) Sean Selvaraj | Negeri Sembilan | Selangor | Free |
| 2 December 2017 | (Malaysia) Muhd Zafuan Azeman | Perlis | Kedah | Free |
| 2 December 2017 | (Malaysia) Zulfahamzie Mohd Tarmizi | Selangor | Kedah | Free |
| 3 December 2017 | (Malaysia) Azamuddin Akil | Johor Darul Ta'zim | Selangor | Free |
| 3 December 2017 | (Malaysia) Nurridzuan Abu Hassan | Pahang | PKNS | Free |
| 3 December 2017 | (Malaysia) Firdaus Faudzi | Terengganu | Kuala Lumpur | Free |
| 3 December 2017 | (Malaysia) Ashmawi Md Yakin | Negeri Sembilan | Selangor | Free |
| 3 December 2017 | (Malaysia) Shahrul Igwan | Negeri Sembilan | Selangor | Free |
| 3 December 2017 | (Brazil) Willian Pacheco | (Indonesia) Persija Jakarta | Selangor | Free |
| 3 December 2017 | (Brazil) Cássio de Jesus | (Indonesia) Semen Padang | Kelantan | Free |
| 3 December 2017 | (Malaysia) Indra Putra Mahayuddin | Kelantan | Kuala Lumpur | Free |
| 4 December 2017 | (Brazil) Demerson | Sarawak | (Indonesia) Bali United | Free |
| 5 December 2017 | (Malaysia) Shafiq Shaharudin | Johor Darul Ta'zim II | Kelantan | Free |
| 5 December 2017 | (Malaysia) Zaquan Adha | Perak | Kuala Lumpur | Free |
| 6 December 2017 | (Malaysia) Sukri Hamid | Perak | Kelantan | Free |
| 6 December 2017 | (Malaysia) Tengku Qayyum | Sime Darby | Kelantan | Free |
| 6 December 2017 | (Malaysia) Haikal Nazri | Felcra | Kelantan | Free |
| 6 December 2017 | (Malaysia) Rafiuddin Roddin | Penang | Perak | Free |
| 6 December 2017 | (Malaysia) Nor Hakim Hassan | T-Team | Perak | Free |
| 6 December 2017 | (France) Steven Thicot | (Greece) AEL | Melaka United | Free |
| 6 December 2017 | (Portugal) Tiago Gomes | (Cyprus) Doxa | Melaka United | Free |
| 7 December 2017 | (Nigeria) Akanni-Sunday Wasiu | UiTM | Terengganu II | Free |
| 8 December 2017 | (Singapore) Madhu Mohana | (Singapore) Tampines Rovers | Negeri Sembilan | Undisclosed |
| 12 December 2017 | (Argentina) Nicolás Vélez | (Thailand) Suphanburi | Negeri Sembilan | Free |
| 14 November 2017 | (Malaysia) Ashari Samsudin | Pahang | Terengganu | Free |
| 15 December 2017 | (Malaysia) Rodney Akwensivie | Sarawak | PKNS | Free |
| 15 December 2017 | (Cambodia) Chan Vathanaka | (Cambodia) Boeung Ket Angkor | Pahang | Undisclosed |
| 16 December 2017 | (Malaysia) Syahid Zaidon | Felda United | Negeri Sembilan | Free |
| 19 December 2017 | (South Korea) Shim Un-seob | (Vietnam) Long An | PDRM | Free |
| 19 December 2017 | (Japan) Bruno Suzuki | Negeri Sembilan | Terengganu II | Free |
| 19 December 2017 | (Malaysia) Syafiq Ahmad | Kedah | Johor Darul Ta'zim | Undisclosed |
| 19 December 2017 | (Malaysia) Muhammad Zamri Hassan | PJ Rangers | Selangor United | Free |
| 19 December 2017 | (Malaysia) R. Barath Kumar | PJ Rangers | MIFA | Free |
| 19 December 2017 | (Malaysia) J. Thanasegar | PJ Rangers | MIFA | Free |
| 20 December 2017 | (Malaysia) Amirizdwan Taj | PKNS | Kelantan | Free |
| 20 December 2017 | (Malaysia) Ronny Harun | Sarawak | Petaling Jaya Rangers | Free |
| 23 December 2017 | (Malaysia) Elias Sulaiman | Penang | Sabah | Free |
| 23 December 2017 | (Malaysia) Mafry Balang | Penang | Sabah | Free |
| 23 December 2017 | (Malaysia) Melky Balang | KDMM | Sabah | Free |
| 23 December 2017 | (Malaysia) Mazlan Yahya | PKNS U21 | Sabah | Free |
| 23 December 2017 | (Malaysia) Justin Samaan | DYS | Sabah | Free |
| 23 December 2017 | (Malaysia) Stanley Sulong | Sabah U21 | Sabah | Free |
| 23 December 2017 | (Malaysia) Evan Wensly | Sabah U19 | Sabah | Free |
| 24 December 2017 | (Brazil) Bruno Soares | (Israel) Hapoel Tel Aviv | Johor Darul Ta'zim | Free |
| 24 December 2017 | (Malaysia) Hasmizan Kamarodin | Kelantan | Terengganu City | Free |
| 24 December 2017 | (Malaysia) Reeshafiq Alwi | MOF | Terengganu City | Free |
| 24 December 2017 | (Malaysia) Hariri Mohd Safii | Negeri Sembilan | Terengganu City | Free |
| 25 December 2017 | (Philippines) Misagh Bahadoran | (Philippines) Global | Perak | Free |
| 26 December 2017 | (Singapore) Shahdan Sulaiman | (Singapore) Tampines Rovers | Melaka United | Free |
| 27 December 2017 | (Belarus) Yahor Zubovich | (Belarus) Torpedo-BelAZ Zhodino | Melaka United | Free |
| 28 December 2017 | (Malaysia) Shahrom Kalam | Perak | Felcra | Free |
| 28 December 2017 | (Malaysia) Asrol Ibrahim | T-Team | Felcra | Free |
| 28 December 2017 | (Malaysia) Badrul Hisham Morris | T-Team | Felcra | Free |
| 28 December 2017 | (Malaysia) Fandi Othman | Johor Darul Ta'zim II | Felcra | Free |
| 28 December 2017 | (Malaysia) Nizam Abu Bakar | PKNS | Felcra | Free |
| 28 December 2017 | (South Korea) Kim Do-heon | (South Korea) Seongnam | Negeri Sembilan | Free |
| 30 December 2017 | (Japan) Ryutaro Karube | (Indonesia) Perseru Serui | UKM | Free |
| 30 December 2017 | (Singapore) Shahfiq Ghani | (Singapore) Geylang International | UKM | Free |
| 30 December 2017 | (South Korea) Nam Se-in | (Portugal) Académico de Viseu | UKM | Free |
| 30 December 2017 | (Philippines) Iain Ramsay | (Thailand) PT Prachuap | Felda United | Free |
| 30 December 2017 | (Malaysia) Aizulridzwan Razali | Felda United | Negeri Sembilan | Free |
| 30 December 2017 | (Malaysia) Fakhrul Aiman Sidid | Felda United | Negeri Sembilan | Free |
| 31 December 2017 | (Romania) Petrișor Voinea | (Saudi Arabia) Wej | PDRM | Free |
| 1 January 2018 | (Singapore) Hariss Harun | (Singapore) Home United | Johor Darul Ta'zim | Loan return |
| 1 January 2018 | (Spain) Pablo Pallarès | (Spain) Ponferradina | Kedah | Free |
| 1 January 2018 | (Spain) Álvaro Silva | (Vietnam) Hà Nội | Kedah | Free |
| 1 January 2018 | (Malaysia) Jasazrin Jamaluddin | Perak | Penang | Free |
| 1 January 2018 | (Malaysia) Muhammad Al-Hafiz | PDRM | Penang | Free |
| 3 January 2018 | (Singapore) Hafiz Abu Sujad | (Singapore) Tampines Rovers | Johor Darul Ta'zim II | Free |
| 3 January 2018 | (Latvia) Renārs Rode | (Latvia) RFS | Negeri Sembilan | Free |
| 3 January 2018 | (Brazil) Flávio Júnior | (Indonesia) Borneo | Negeri Sembilan | Free |
| 4 January 2018 | (Brazil) Bruno Lopes | (Indonesia) Persija Jakarta | Kelantan | Free |
| 4 January 2018 | (Indonesia) Ferdinand Sinaga | (Indonesia) PSM Makassar | Kelantan | Free |
| 5 January 2018 | (Singapore) Faris Ramli | (Singapore) Home United | PKNS | Free |
| 5 January 2018 | (Colombia) Romel Morales | (Argentina) Banfield | PKNS | Free |
| 6 January 2018 | (Malaysia) Zul Fahmi Awang | Sime Darby | Kelantan | Free |
| 6 January 2018 | (Malaysia) Lot Abu Hassan | Sarawak | Penang | Free |
| 6 January 2018 | (Malaysia) Fitri Shazwan | Selangor | Penang | Free |
| 6 January 2018 | (Malaysia) Jasazrin Jamaluddin | Perak | Penang | Free |
| 6 January 2018 | (Malaysia) Raimi Nor | Selangor | Penang | Free |
| 6 January 2018 | (Malaysia) Azinee Taib | Johor Darul Ta'zim II | Penang | Free |
| 6 January 2018 | (Malaysia) Mafry Balang | Penang | Sabah | Free |
| 10 January 2018 | (Brazil) Wander Luiz Bitencourt Junior | (Saudi Arabia) Al-Raed | Perak | Free |
| 28 January 2018 | (Spain) Alfonso de la Cruz | Unattached | Selangor | Free |
| 9 February 2018 | (Indonesia) Andik Vermansyah | Selangor | Kedah | Free |
| 9 February 2018 | (Liberia) Francis Forkey Doe | Selangor | Pahang | Free |

=== Loans ===
| Date | Name | Moving from | Moving to | Ref |
|---|---|---|---|---|
| 17 November 2017 | (Malaysia) Farhan Abu Bakar | Kedah | Petaling Jaya Rangers | |

=== Unattached players ===
| Date | Name | New Club | Ref |
|---|---|---|---|
| 19 November 2017 | (Argentina) Luciano Figueroa | Johor Darul Ta'zim | |
| 4 December 2017 | (Brazil) Juninho | Kuala Lumpur | |
| 6 December 2017 | (Malaysia) Brendan Gan | Perak | |
| 6 December 2017 | (Malaysia) Rafiz Faeez | Perak | |
| 6 December 2017 | (Malaysia) Khairul Asyraf Sahizah | Perak | |
