= Hanelang F.C. =

Malaysian football club

Terengganu Hanelang
- Full name: Persatuan Bolasepak Hulu Terengganu
- Founded: 2014; 12 years ago
- Dissolved: 2019
- Ground: Gong Badak Sports Complex
- Owner: Hulu Terengganu Football Association
- Chairman: Abdullah Sulong
- Manager: Hama Hakim Wahyudi Awang
- Coach: Ahmad Yusof
- 2018: Malaysia FAM League (withdraw)
Home colours	Away colours

Terengganu Hanelang was a football club representing the district of Hulu Terengganu. The team's homebase was located at Tasik Kenyir. They last played in the third-tier Malaysia FAM League.

== History ==
Terengganu Hanelang were first established in 2014 by Terengganu Football Association as the third team from Terengganu to compete in the Malaysia football league, after Terengganu F.A. and T-Team F.C. The team was registered for the 2014 Malaysia FAM League under the administration of Persatuan Bolasepak Daerah Hulu Terengganu, and used the name Terengganu Hanelang. They withdraw from the FAM League on 20 July 2018, due to financial problems, and their results for that season were expunged.

== Stadium ==
The team's home stadium was Padang Astaka Kuala Berang, an open field with 1,000 capacity grandstand, in Kuala Berang. They also have played in Sultan Ismail Nasiruddin Shah Stadium and Sultan Mizan Zainal Abidin Stadium, both in Kuala Terengganu.

== Kit manufacturer and shirt sponsor ==
Period	Kit manufacturer	Shirt sponsor
2014	Kika	Kamal Sports
2015	Kika	Kamal Sports
2016	Mizuno	Transformasi Terengganu Berhad
2017	Kobert	Chicken Cottage
2018	Adidas	TTB, Tulangis Group

== 2018 squad ==
As of 19 February 2018 Note: Flags indicate national team as defined under FIFA eligibility rules; some limited exceptions apply. Players may hold more than one non-FIFA nationality.

No.	Pos.	Nation	Player
1	GK	MAS	Norhadi Ubaidullah
2	DF	MAS	Muzammer Zaki
4	DF	MAS	Wan Abdul Azizul
5	MF	MAS	Hasrolsyawal Hamid
6	DF	MAS	Amirul Dzulkarnain
7	FW	MAS	Zairo Anuar
8	MF	MAS	Asyraf Talib
9	DF	MAS	Saiful Nizam
11	MF	MAS	Faizol Hussien
13	DF	MAS	Hasmizan Kamarodin
14	MF	MAS	Aizat Asli
16	FW	MAS	Syafiq Azmi
17	DF	MAS	Tuah Iskandar Jamaluddin

No.	Pos.	Nation	Player
18	FW	MAS	Shahrizal Saad
19	DF	MAS	Ahmad Azlan Zainal
20	DF	MAS	Hariri Safii
21	MF	MAS	Faizal Mansor
22	DF	MAS	Khairul Ramadhan
23	FW	MAS	Haris Safwan Kamal
24	FW	MAS	Syamri Ja'afar
25	GK	MAS	Mohd Syamsuri Mustafa
26	GK	MAS	Farzly Muhammad
27	MF	MAS	Shahril Izwan
28	MF	MAS	Nabilah Khan
30	MF	MAS	Shazuan Ashraf

== Management team (2018) ==
=== Club personnel ===
Position	Name
President	Abdullah Sulong
Manager	Hama Hakim Wahyudi Awang
Assistant manager	Jibril Mat Ali
Head coach	Ahmad Yusof
Assistant coach	Riduan Jusoh
Assistant coach	Syed Azla Syed Muhamad
Fitness coach	Mohd Shaiful Hazmi Salleh
Goalkeeper coach	Ismail Rahmat
Head physio	Roslan Abdul Aziz
Physio	Mohd Fauzi Ali
Masseur	Saipuddin Alias

== Team managers ==
Year	Manager
2014	Talaha Ali
2015	Zaki Ismail

== Coaches ==
Year	Coach
2014	Mustapha Kamal Abdul Wahab
2015–2016	Abdul Rahim Ahmad
2017	Zakaria Ismail
Dec 2017	Ahmad Yusof

== Achievements ==
Year	Position	League	Piala FA	Piala Malaysia/Piala Cabaran	Top scorer
2014	8th,	Liga FAM	Not Participated	Not Participated	
2015	10th, Group A	Liga FAM	First Round	Not Participated	
2016	6th, Group A	Liga FAM	First Round	Not Participated	
2017	6th, Group B	Liga FAM	Second Round	Not Participated	
2018	Withdraw	Liga FAM	Second Round	Not Participated	

== See also ==
- Terengganu
- T-Team FC
- Terengganu City
