= 2017 Malaysia FAM League =

Malaysia FAM Cup
- Season: 2017
- Dates: 19 February−22 October 2017
- Champions: Sime Darby
- Promoted: Sime Darby; UKM
- Matches played: 112
- Goals scored: 342 (3.05 per match)
- Biggest home win: Felcra 7−0 DBKL (8 July 2017)
- Biggest away win: Penjara 0−4 Sime Darby (19 February 2017)
- Highest scoring: MPKB 3−4 UKM (26 February 2017)
- Longest unbeaten run: 8 Matches; Petaling Jaya Rangers
- Longest winless run: 11 Matches; Penjara
- Longest losing run: 5 Matches; Hanelang
- All statistics correct as of 22 October 2017.

The 2017 Malaysia FAM Cup (referred to as the FAM Cup or FAM League) is the 66th season of the Malaysia FAM League since its establishment in 1952. The league is currently the third level football league in Malaysia. MISC-MIFA are the previous champion and currently play in the second level of Malaysian football, Malaysia Premier League.

The season started on 19 February 2017 and concluded on 22 October 2017.

== Season changes ==
The following teams have changed division since the 2016 season.

=== To Malaysia FAM League ===
Relegated from Premier League

- (Kuala Lumpur) Sime Darby

Promoted from KLFA Division 1 League

- (Kuala Lumpur) DBKL F.C.

Promoted from 2015–16 Liga Bolasepak Rakyat

- (Sarawak) Kuching

New Team

- Terengganu City

=== From Malaysia FAM League ===
Promoted To Premier League

- (Perak) PKNP F.C.
- (Malaysia) MIFA

Teams withdrawn

- (Sabah) DYS F.C.
- (Selangor) Megah Murni F.C.
- (Perak) Ipoh F.A.
- (Penang) Sungai Ara F.C.

== Clubs ==
For 2017 season, there are 16 teams currently will compete in the league where 13 teams are from last season while new teams will know from FAM.

- (Kuala Lumpur) DBKL F.C.
- (Kuala Lumpur) FELCRA F.C.
- (Terengganu) Hanelang F.C.
- (Sabah) KDMM F.C.
- (Sarawak) Kuching F.A.
- (Kuala Lumpur) MOF F.C.
- (Kelantan) MPKB-BRI U-Bes F.C.
- (Selangor) PBMS F.C.
- Penjara F.C.
- (Selangor) Petaling Jaya Rangers F.C.
- (Malacca) SAMB F.C.
- (Pahang) Shahzan Muda S.C.
- (Kuala Lumpur) Sime Darby F.C.
- Terengganu City F.C.
- (Selangor) UKM F.C.

=== Teams, locations and stadia ===
Locations of teams in the 2017 Malaysia FAM Cup

=== Stadium and locations ===
Team	Location	Stadium
(Kuala Lumpur) DBKL	Kuala Lumpur	UM Arena Stadium
(Kuala Lumpur) FELCRA	Kuala Lumpur	UM Arena Stadium
(Terengganu) Hanelang	Kuala Berang	Padang Astaka Kuala Berang
(Sabah) KDMM	Keningau	Keningau Stadium
(Sarawak) Kuching	Kuching	Sarawak State Stadium
(Putrajaya) MOF	Putrajaya	INSPENS Stadium
(Kelantan) MPKB-BRI UBeS	Kota Bharu	Sultan Muhammad IV Stadium
(Selangor) PBMS	Kuala Selangor	Kuala Selangor Stadium
Penjara	Kajang	Kajang Prison Mini Stadium
(Selangor) Petaling Jaya Rangers	Petaling Jaya	Petaling Jaya Stadium
(Malacca) SAMB	Malacca City	Hang Tuah Stadium
(Pahang) Shahzan Muda	Temerloh	Temerloh Mini Stadium
(Kuala Lumpur) Sime Darby	Shah Alam	Bukit Jelutong Training Facility
Terengganu City	Kuala Terengganu	Sultan Ismail Nasiruddin Shah Stadium
(Selangor) UKM	Bangi	UKM Bangi Stadium

=== Personnel and sponsoring ===
Note: Flags indicate national team as has been defined under FIFA eligibility rules. Players may hold more than one non-FIFA nationality.

Team	Coach	Captain	Kit	Sponsor
DBKL	(Malaysia) Tan Siew Seng	(Malaysia) Chairi Emmir Solehaddin	Kappa	Kuala Lumpur City Hall
FELCRA	(Malaysia) Rosle Md. Derus	(Malaysia) Mohd Fadzli Saari	Uhlsport	FELCRA Berhad
Hanelang	(Malaysia) Zakaria Ismail	(Malaysia) Mohd Khairul Rosmadi	Kobert	Chicken Cottage
KDMM	(Malaysia) Andrew Majanggim	(Malaysia) Hardy Charles Parsi	Carino	Carino
Kuching	(Malaysia) Lucas Kalang Laeng	(Malaysia) Ahmad Shakri Tuah	Starsport	City of Unity
MOF	(Malaysia) S. Balachandran	(Malaysia) Rudie Ramli	Adidas	Ministry of Finance
MPKB-BRI U-BeS	(Malaysia) Kamarudin Muhammad	(Malaysia) Tuan Mohd Norhafiziee Tuan Mahmood	GomoGi	Kota Bharu Municipal Council
PB Melayu Selangor	(Malaysia) Zulakbal Abdul Karim	(Malaysia) Mohd Redzuan Harun	Kappa	
Penjara	(Malaysia) Hasnan Ahmad	(Malaysia) Alhapis Alwi	Pride Waves	
Petaling Jaya Rangers	(Malaysia) Mat Zan Mat Aris	(Malaysia) Zamri Hasan	Line 7	AirAsia
SAMB	(Malaysia) G. Torairaju	(Malaysia) Mohd Syafizullah Abdul Wahab	Kronos	SAMB
Shahzan Muda	(Malaysia) Tajuddin Nor	(Malaysia) Mohd Shahrizan Salleh	Macron	
Sime Darby	(Malaysia) Ahmad Yusof	(Malaysia) Tengku Qayyum Ubaidillah Tengku Ahmad	Kappa	Sime Darby
Terengganu City	(Malaysia) Roshaidi Wahab	(Malaysia) Zairo Anuar Zalani	Kaki Jersi	TULANGIS GROUP
UKM	(Malaysia) Sulaiman Husin	(Malaysia) Mohd Hafizuddin Sulaiman	Warrix	Kopi Pak Belalang

== League stages ==
=== Group A ===
Pos	Team	Pld	W	D	L	GF	GA	GD	Pts	Promotion or qualification
1	UKM	14	8	4	2	24	11	+13	28	Advance to knock-out stage & Promoted to the Premier League
2	FELCRA	14	7	4	3	26	12	+14	25	Advance to knock-out stage & Promoted to the Premier League
3	Shahzan Muda	14	7	4	3	17	11	+6	25	Advance to knock-out stage
4	MOF	14	7	2	5	22	18	+4	23	Advance to knock-out stage
5	MPKB-BRI U-Bes	14	5	6	3	21	16	+5	21	
6	Hanelang	14	3	3	8	11	28	−17	12	
7	DBKL	14	2	4	8	9	20	−11	10	
8	KDMM	14	2	3	9	13	27	−14	9	Withdrew end of season.

Updated to match(es) played on 5 August 2017. Source:
Rules for classification: 1) Points; 2) Goal difference; 3) Number of goals scored

=== Group B ===
Pos	Team	Pld	W	D	L	GF	GA	GD	Pts	Promotion or qualification
1	Sime Darby	12	7	2	3	21	6	+15	23	Advance to knock-out stage & Withdrew end of season.
2	PJ Rangers	12	6	5	1	14	8	+6	23	Advance to knock-out stage
3	Terengganu City	12	6	3	3	13	12	+1	21	Advance to knock-out stage
4	Kuching	12	5	3	4	15	14	+1	18	Advance to knock-out stage
5	SAMB	12	4	5	3	13	13	0	17	Withdrew end of season.
6	PBMS	12	2	2	8	11	19	−8	8	
7	Penjara	12	1	2	9	7	22	−15	5	Withdrew end of season.

Updated to match(es) played on 29 July 2017. Source:
Rules for classification: 1) Points; 2) Goal difference; 3) Number of goals scored

=== Fixtures and results ===
Fixtures and Results of the Liga FAM 2017 season.

==== Group A ====
===== Matchday 1 =====
19 February 2017	UKM (Selangor)	4–0	(Sabah) KDMM	Bangi, Selangor
16:45 UTC+8	Nurzaidi Bunari 22', 63'; Hasrul Nurkholis 28'; Helmi Hariri 36'			Stadium: UKM Bangi Stadium

19 February 2017	Hanelang (Terengganu)	0–3	(Kelantan) MPKB-BRI U-BeS	Kuala Berang, Terengganu
16:45 UTC+8			29', 59' Masri Asyraf; 56' Ruziman Zakaria	Stadium: Kuala Berang Pavilion Field

19 February 2017	Shahzan Muda (Pahang)	2–0	(Kuala Lumpur) DBKL	Temerloh, Pahang
20:45 UTC+8	Shahrizan Salleh 46'; Mohd Rifaie 90+1'			Stadium: Temerloh Mini Stadium

19 February 2017	Felcra (Kuala Lumpur)	1–2	(Kuala Lumpur) MOF	University of Malaya, Kuala Lumpur
20:45 UTC+8	Hafizi Mat Podzi 41'		Aikal Aiman 11'; Rudie Ramli 17'	Stadium: University of Malaya Stadium

===== Matchday 2 =====
26 February 2017	KDMM (Sabah)	0–1	(Kuala Lumpur) Felcra	Keningau, Sabah
16:15 UTC+8			39' Haziq Mu'iz	Stadium: Keningau Sport Complex

26 February 2017	DBKL (Kuala Lumpur)	2–0	(Terengganu) Hanelang	Bangi, Selangor
16:45 UTC+8	Ikhram Ibrahim 14'; Syafiq Redzuan 59' (Pen.)			Stadium: UKM Bangi Stadium

26 February 2017	MPKB-BRI U-BeS (Kelantan)	3–4	(Selangor) UKM	Kota Bharu, Kelantan
20:45 UTC+8	Khairudin Ramli 76', 87'; Raim Azmi 90'		1' Helmi Hariri; 9', 66', 84' Hasrul Nurkholis	Stadium: Sultan Muhammad IV Stadium

26 February 2017	MOF (Kuala Lumpur)	1–0	(Pahang) Shahzan Muda	Bangi, Selangor
20:45 UTC+8	Farizal Rozali 76'			Stadium: INSPENS Stadium

===== Matchday 3 =====
5 March 2017	KDMM (Sabah)	0–0	(Kuala Lumpur) MOF	Keningau, Sabah
16:15 UTC+8				Stadium: Keningau Sport Complex

5 March 2017	Hanelang (Terengganu)	0–1	(Pahang) Shahzan Muda	Gong Badak, Terengganu
16:45 UTC+8			73' Rizua Shafiqi	Stadium: Sultan Mizan Zainal Abidin Stadium

5 March 2017	UKM (Selangor)	1–1	(Kuala Lumpur) DBKL	Bangi, Selangor
16:45 UTC+8	Asnan Ahmad 67'		53' Ikhram Ibrahim	Stadium: UKM Bangi Stadium

5 March 2017	Felcra (Kuala Lumpur)	1–1	(Kelantan) MPKB-BRI U-BeS	University of Malaya, Kuala Lumpur
20:45 UTC+8	Hafizi Mat Podzi 65'		35' Raim Azmi	Stadium: University of Malaya Stadium

===== Matchday 4 =====
19 March 2017	DBKL (Kuala Lumpur)	0–1	(Kuala Lumpur) Felcra	University of Malaya, Kuala Lumpur
20:45 UTC+8			36' Syafiq Azmi	Stadium: University of Malaya Stadium

19 March 2017	Shahzan Muda (Pahang)	0–0	(Selangor) UKM	Temerloh, Pahang
20:45 UTC+8				Stadium: Temerloh Mini Stadium

19 March 2017	MOF (Kuala Lumpur)	5–0	(Terengganu) Hanelang	Bangi, Selangor
20:45 UTC+8	Aikal Aiman 20', 65'; Rudie Ramli 35', 73'; Mohd Akmal 57'			Stadium: INSPENS Stadium

====== Postponed match ======
29 March 2017	MPKB-BRI U-BeS (Kelantan)	2–2	(Sabah) KDMM	Kota Bharu, Kelantan
20:45 UTC+8	Raim Azmi 17' (Pen.); Masri Asyraf 90+4'		44' Azizul Madirin; 51' Billy Doliente	Stadium: Sultan Muhammad IV Stadium

===== Matchday 5 =====
9 April 2017	KDMM (Sabah)	3–1	(Kuala Lumpur) DBKL	Keningau, Sabah
16:15 UTC+8	Melky Balang 1' (Pen.), 76' (Pen.), 86'		8' Ikhram Ibrahim	Stadium: Keningau Sport Complex

9 April 2017	UKM (Selangor)	3–1	(Terengganu) Hanelang	Bangi, Selangor
16:45 UTC+8	Nurzaidi Bunari 24'; Hasrul Nurkholis 47'; 66'		74'	Stadium: UKM Bangi Stadium

9 April 2017	Felcra (Kuala Lumpur)	0–1	(Pahang) Shahzan Muda	University of Malaya, Kuala Lumpur
20:45 UTC+8			90+2' Firdaus Anuar	Stadium: University of Malaya Stadium

9 April 2017	MPKB-BRI U-BeS (Kelantan)	1–2	(Kuala Lumpur) MOF	Kota Bharu, Kelantan
20:45 UTC+8	Ashnizan Daud 66'		54' Mohd Akmal; 64' Rudie Ramli	Stadium: Sultan Muhammad IV Stadium

===== Matchday 6 =====
16 April 2017	Hanelang (Terengganu)	1–1	(Kuala Lumpur) Felcra	Kuala Berang, Terengganu
16:45 UTC+8	Goal		N. Thanabalan	Stadium: Kuala Berang Pavilion Field

16 April 2017	DBKL (Kuala Lumpur)	0–0	(Kelantan) MPKB-BRI U-BeS	University of Malaya, Kuala Lumpur
20:45 UTC+8				Stadium: University of Malaya Stadium

16 April 2017	Shahzan Muda (Pahang)	2–0	(Sabah) KDMM	Temerloh, Pahang
20:45 UTC+8	Amir Ashraf 28'; Firdaus Anuar 42'			Stadium: Temerloh Mini Stadium

16 April 2017	MOF (Kuala Lumpur)	1–2	(Selangor) UKM	Bangi, Selangor
20:45 UTC+8	Aikal Aiman 73'		15' Hasrul Nurkholis; 50' Faizol Fazree	Stadium: INSPENS Stadium

===== Matchday 7 =====
23 April 2017	KDMM (Sabah)	1–2	(Terengganu) Hanelang	Keningau, Sabah
16:45 UTC+8	Ahmad Sabri 18'		36'; 58'	Stadium: Keningau Sport Complex

23 April 2017	Felcra (Kuala Lumpur)	1–0	(Selangor) UKM	University of Malaya, Kuala Lumpur
20:45 UTC+8	N. Thanabalan 49'			Stadium: University of Malaya Stadium

23 April 2017	MPKB-BRI U-BeS (Kelantan)	1–0	(Pahang) Shahzan Muda	Kota Bharu, Kelantan
20:45 UTC+8	Raim Azmi 32'			Stadium: Sultan Muhammad IV Stadium

23 April 2017	MOF (Kuala Lumpur)	2–1	(Kuala Lumpur) DBKL	Bangi, Selangor
20:45 UTC+8	Aikal Aiman 8' (Pen.); Rudie Ramli 23'		6' Amin Asraf	Stadium: INSPENS Stadium

===== Matchday 8 =====
30 April 2017	Hanelang (Terengganu)	2–1	(Sabah) KDMM	Kuala Berang, Terengganu
16:45 UTC+8	Goal		Yazili Yunat	Stadium: Kuala Berang Pavilion Field

30 April 2017	UKM (Selangor)	1–0	(Kuala Lumpur) Felcra	Bangi, Selangor
16:45 UTC+8	Azri Zulkiflee 76'			Stadium: UKM Bangi Stadium

30 April 2017	Shahzan Muda (Pahang)	3–2	(Kelantan) MPKB-BRI U-BeS	Temerloh, Pahang
20:45 UTC+8	Hariz Fazrin 16'; Faizal Abdul Rani 55' (Pen.), 90'		Ashnizan Daud 45+2'; Khairudin Ramli 82'	Stadium: Temerloh Mini Stadium

30 April 2017	DBKL (Kuala Lumpur)	3–0	(Kuala Lumpur) MOF	University of Malaya, Kuala Lumpur
20:45 UTC+8				Stadium: University of Malaya Stadium

===== Matchday 9 =====
7 May 2017	KDMM (Sabah)	2–2	(Selangor) UKM	Keningau, Sabah
16:15 UTC+8	Ahmad Sabri 45+2'; Azizul Madirin 90+4'		61'; 64' Al-Amin Abdullah	Stadium: Keningau Sport Complex

7 May 2017	DBKL (Kuala Lumpur)	1–1	(Pahang) Shahzan Muda	University of Malaya, Kuala Lumpur
20:45 UTC+8	Hadzirun Che Hamid 15'		24' Hariz Fazrin	Stadium: University of Malaya Stadium

7 May 2017	MPKB-BRI U-BeS (Kelantan)	1–0	(Terengganu) Hanelang	Kota Bharu, Kelantan
20:45 UTC+8	Farhan Yaacob 90'			Stadium: Sultan Muhammad IV Stadium

====== Postponed match ======
8 May 2017	MOF (Kuala Lumpur)	2–4	(Kuala Lumpur) Felcra	Bangi, Selangor
20:45 UTC+8	K. Divinesh 4'; Aikal Aiman 54'		12' (Pen.) Fazliata Taib; 31' Firdaus Azizul; 60', 89' N. Thanabalan	Stadium: INSPENS Stadium

== Knock-out stage ==
=== Bracket ===
Quarter-finals
Kuching	0	1	1
UKM	2	0	2
Shahzan Muda	2	1	3
PJ Rangers	1	0	1
MOF	0	1	1
Sime Darby	1	4	5
Terengganu City	1	0	1
Felcra	1	1	2

Semi-finals
UKM	0	1	1
Shahzan Muda	0	0	0
Sime Darby	0	1	1
Felcra	0	0	0

Final
UKM	0	2	2
Sime Darby	1	2	3

=== Quarter-finals ===
==== First leg ====
19 September 2017
20:15 UTC+8

Kuching	0–2	UKM
		Hasrul Nurkholis 27', 63'

Sarawak State Stadium, Kuching

19 September 2017
20:45 UTC+8

Shahzan Muda	2–1	Petaling Jaya Rangers
Rifaei Awang Long 10'; Helmi Abdullah 58'		Abdul Azim Rahim 5'

Temerloh Mini Stadium, Temerloh

19 September 2017
20:45 UTC+8

MOF	0–1	Sime Darby
		Zul Fahmi Awang 28'

Inspens Stadium, Kajang

19 September 2017
20:45 UTC+8

Terengganu City	1–1	Felcra
Zairo Anuar Zalani 14'		Alif Shamsudin 23'

Sultan Mizan Zainal Abidin Stadium, Kuala Nerus

==== Second leg ====
27 September 2017
16:15 UTC+8

UKM	0–1	Kuching
		Sufizal Ismail 12'

UKM Bangi Stadium, Bangi

UKM won 2–1 on aggregate.

27 September 2017
20:45 UTC+8

Petaling Jaya Rangers	0–1	Shahzan Muda
		Rifae Awang Long 85'

Petaling Jaya Stadium, Petaling Jaya

Shahzan Muda won 3–1 on aggregate.

27 September 2017
16:15 UTC+8

Sime Darby	4–1	MOF
A Segar 42'; Zul Fahmi 45', 75'; Nazrul Kamaruzaman 63'		Razle Putih 89'

Bukit Jelutong Training Facility, Bukit Jelutong

Sime Darby won 5–1 on aggregate.

27 September 2017
20:45 UTC+8

Felcra	1–0	Terengganu City
Firdaus Azizul 37'

UM Arena Stadium. Kuala Lumpur

Felcra won 2–1 on aggregate.

=== Semi-finals ===
==== First leg ====
2 October 2017
20:45 UTC+8

Shahzan Muda	0–0	UKM

Temerloh Mini Stadium, Temerloh

2 October 2017
20:45 UTC+8

Felcra	0–0	Sime Darby

UM Arena Stadium, Kuala Lumpur

==== Second leg ====
8 October 2017
16:15 UTC+8

UKM	1–0 (a.e.t.)	Shahzan Muda
Faidzol Fazreen 111'

UKM Bangi Stadium, Bangi

UKM won 1–0 on aggregate after extra time.

8 October 2017
16:15 UTC+8

Sime Darby	1–0	Felcra
Zul Fahmi Awang 40'

Petaling Jaya Stadium, Petaling Jaya

Sime Darby won 1–0 on aggregate.

=== Finals ===
==== First leg ====
15 October 2017
20:45 UTC+8

UKM	0–1	Sime Darby
		Zul Fahmi Awang 53'

Tuanku Abdul Rahman Stadium, Paroi

==== Second leg ====
22 October 2017
20:45 UTC+8

Sime Darby	2–2	UKM
Nazrul Kamaruzaman 29'; Tunku Noor Hidayat 55'		Hasrul Nurkholis 17'; Faidzol Fazreen 89'

Petaling Jaya Stadium, Petaling Jaya

Sime Darby won 3–2 on aggregate.

== Knock-out stage statistics ==
=== Goalscorers ===
As of 22 October 2017.

Rank	Player	Club	Goals
1	Zul Fahmi Awang	Sime Darby	5
2	Hasrul Nurkholis	UKM	3
3	Rifaei Awang Long	Shahzan Muda	2
3	Nazrul Kamaruzaman	Sime Darby	2
3	Faidzol Fazreen	UKM	2
6	Helmi Abdullah	Shahzan Muda	1
6	Abdul Azim Rahim	Petaling Jaya Rangers	1
6	Zairo Anuar Zalani	Terengganu City	1
6	Alif Shamsudin	Felcra	1
6	Firdaus Azizul	Felcra	1
6	Sufizal Ismail	Kuching	1
6	A. Segar	Sime Darby	1
6	Tunku Noor Hidayat	Sime Darby	1
6	Razle Putih	MOF	1

== See also ==
- 2017 Malaysia Super League
- 2017 Malaysia Premier League
- 2017 Malaysia FA Cup
- 2017 Malaysia Cup
- 2017 Malaysia President's Cup
- 2017 Malaysia Youth League
- List of Malaysian football transfers 2017
