= Razip Ismail =

Malaysian footballer and coach

Personal information
- Full name: Mohamed Razip bin Ismail
- Date of birth: 23 April 1962 (age 64)
- Place of birth: Selangor, Malaysia
- Position: Defender

Team information
- Current team: MOF F.C. (Head Coach)

Youth career
- Kuala Lumpur FA

Senior career*
Years	Team	Apps	(Gls)
1979–1994	Kuala Lumpur FA		

International career^{‡}
1984–1989	Malaysia		

Managerial career
- 2008–2012: Kuala Lumpur FA
- 2013–2014: Harimau Muda B
- 2015: Harimau Muda
- 2016: Bukit Jalil Sports School
- 2016: Pahang FC
- 2017: Perlis FA
- 2018: MOF F.C.
- * Club domestic league appearances and goals as of 24 November 2006 ‡ National team caps and goals as of 24 September 2012

Mohamed Razip bin Ismail or popularly known as Razip Ismail (born 23 April 1962) is a Malaysian former football player and coach. His preferred playing position is as a defender. His last job was as the manager of MOF FC in 2018.

== Career as player ==
He formerly played for Kuala Lumpur FA from 1979 to 1994. He was in the Kuala Lumpur team that won Malaysia Cup three consecutive seasons (1987, 1988 and 1989), FA Cup two consecutive seasons (1993, 1994) and the league championship (1986, 1988).

Razip also played for Malaysia in international tournaments. He was part of the team that clinched the football gold medal for Malaysia in the 1989 Sea Games held in Kuala Lumpur.

== Career as coach ==
Razip coached his former team Kuala Lumpur FA from 2008 until 2012. During that time Kuala Lumpur were promoted to the Malaysia Super League in 2009 before being relegated to the Malaysia Premier League in 2012.

He took over as head coach of Harimau Muda B, who were playing in the Singapore's S.League, from Ismail Ibrahim in 2013, on a 2-year contract. With the team, he won plate winner 2013 Singapore League Cup. On February 8, 2015, Razip won his first ever international tournament as coach after beating Bangladesh 3–2 in Bangabandhu Cup final, awarding the Malaysia U-22 squad the cup.

On 17 March 2016, Razip was appointed head coach of Pahang FC. His contract was not renewed at the end of the 2016 season.

Razip next was announced as the new head coach of Perlis FA for their 2017 Malaysia Premier League season. But, on 6 March 2017, he quits as Perlis FA head coach, his team rooted to the bottom of the league.

In December 2017, Razip was announced as MOF F.C. head coach for their 2018 Malaysia FAM Cup season.
