= Young Fighters F.C. =

Malaysian football club

Young Fighters
- Full name: Young Fighters Football Club
- Short name: YFFC
- Founded: 2013; 13 years ago
- Ground: USIM Mini Stadium
- President: Hanapi Suhada
- Head coach: Omar Ali
- League: Malaysia FAM League

Young Fighters was a Malaysian football club based in Kuala Lumpur. A reserve squad for FELDA United, they last played in the third-tier Malaysia FAM League.

== Ownership and finances ==
The club was founded in 2015 and owned by FELDA United with the financial backing of its parent company, FELDA. The club was based at the UKM Bangi Stadium in Bangi. After 2015 Malaysia FAM League season concluded, Young Fighters pulled from the league and most of the players were released or absorbed to youth team of FELDA United which competed in the Malaysia President's Cup and the Malaysia Youth League.

The team was re-activated in 2018 to play in the 2018 Malaysia FAM Cup. For the 2018 season, the team played its league matches at the USIM Mini Stadium in Nilai, and at the UPM Mini Stadium in Serdang.

=== Sponsorship ===
Period	Kit manufacturer	Shirt sponsor
2015	PUMA	FELDA
2018	Fitech	FELDA
