= DBKL S.C. =

Malaysian sports club

- Full name: Kelab Sukan Dewan Bandaraya Kuala Lumpur; Kuala Lumpur City Hall Sports Club
- Founded: 27 October 1952
- Owner: Kuala Lumpur City Hall
- League: Kuala Lumpur League
- 2024–25: KLFA Super League, 5th of 6

The Kelab Sukan Dewan Bandaraya Kuala Lumpur (KSDBKL) (English: Kuala Lumpur City Hall Sports Club) is a sports club based in Kuala Lumpur. Its football department last competed in the third tier of Malaysian football, the Malaysia FAM Cup, in 2018.

== History ==
KSDBKL sports club was founded on 27 October 1952. Its football team has competed in the Malaysia FAM Cup during the 1980s and 1990s, and reached the final of the competition for six times between 1985 and 1991, winning it on four occasions.

The club once again competed in the third division of Malaysian football (Malaysia FAM League) during the 2017 season.

== Honours ==
=== Domestic competitions ===
- Malaysia FAM League

(gold) Winners (4): 1987, 1988, 1990, 1991

(silver) Runners-up (2): 1985, 1989

== See also ==
- Kuala Lumpur City F.C.
