= D'AR Wanderers F.C. =

Malaysian football club

D'AR Wanderers
- Full name: D'AR Wanderers Football Club
- Founded: 2017; 8 years ago
- Dissolved: 2019; 6 years ago
- Ground: Temerloh Mini Stadium
- Capacity: 10,000
- Chairman: Ahmad Razali Azmi
- Manager: Adli Daud
- League: Malaysia FAM League
- 2018: 3rd, Group B
Home colours	Away colours

D'AR Wanderers Football Club was a football club based in Temerloh, Pahang. The club last competed in the third tier Malaysia FAM League.

== Club officials (2018) ==
=== Executive committee ===
Position	Name
President	(Malaysia) Ahmad Razali Azmi
Deputy president	(Malaysia) Adli Daud
Vice president	(Malaysia) Saharudin Harun Ismail
General secretary	(Malaysia) Boruhan Hassan
Executive Committee members	(Malaysia) Amril Aiman
Executive Committee members	(Malaysia) Mohd Jeffrey Ismail
Executive Committee members	(Malaysia) Irwan Mohamed Dari
Executive Committee members	(Malaysia) Mohd Zulhilmi Nural Anuar
Executive Committee members	(Malaysia) Saharudin Harun Ismail
Executive Committee members	(Malaysia) Rashid Ramli
Executive Committee members	(Malaysia) Abu Bakar Majid
Media officer	(Malaysia) Mohd Khairul Azrin Holed

== Final players ==
Note: Flags indicate national team as defined under FIFA eligibility rules; some limited exceptions apply. Players may hold more than one non-FIFA nationality.

No.	Pos.	Nation	Player
1	GK	(Malaysia) MAS	Muhammad Azwan Alimi
2	MF	(Malaysia) MAS	Muhammad Atho'illah Mamat
3	MF	(Malaysia) MAS	Muhammad Afiq Fikri Azmi
4	MF	(Malaysia) MAS	Amirullah Abd Razab
5	MF	(Malaysia) MAS	Affif Ashraf Jamalludin
6	DF	(Malaysia) MAS	Ahmad Azrul Azrie
7	MF	(Malaysia) MAS	Zulfahmi Awang
8	MF	(Malaysia) MAS	Tam Sheang Tsung
9	MF	(Malaysia) MAS	Wan Ahmad Fuad
10	MF	(Malaysia) MAS	Nor Farhan Muhammad (on loan from Kelantan)
11	MF	(Malaysia) MAS	Al Hakim Romli
12	DF	(Malaysia) MAS	Mohd Hashim Shamsudin
13	DF	(Malaysia) MAS	Aiman Shakir Mohd Hashim
14	FW	(Malaysia) MAS	Wan Mohd Aliff Wan Jasmi

No.	Pos.	Nation	Player
15	MF	(Malaysia) MAS	Wan Aniq Naim Wan Johari
16	FW	(Malaysia) MAS	Mohd Saufie Hamid
17	MF	(Malaysia) MAS	Abdul Hadi Abdul Rahman
18	MF	(Malaysia) MAS	Muhd Fadirul Jaafar
20	DF	(Malaysia) MAS	Helmi Remeli (captain)
22	GK	(Malaysia) MAS	Muhammad Hafizan Ramlan
24	DF	(Malaysia) MAS	Zairul Fitree
25	GK	(Malaysia) MAS	Muhammad Izzuddin Hussin
26	FW	(Malaysia) MAS	Nik Khairul Anuar Nik Mahipal
27	MF	(Malaysia) MAS	Mohamad Fikram Mohamad
28	MF	(Malaysia) MAS	Amirul Izwan Mohd Baki
29	FW	(Malaysia) MAS	Zul Fahmi Awang (on loan from Kelantan)
30	DF	(Malaysia) MAS	Daudsu Jamaluddin
31	MF	(Malaysia) MAS	Wan Mohd Atiq Irfan (on loan from Kelantan)

=== Coaching and technical staff ===
Position	Name
Manager	(Malaysia) Adli Daud
Assistant manager	(Malaysia) Jumrisyah Mohd Nazry
Head coach	(Malaysia) Mohd Hashim Mustapha
Assistant coach 1	(Malaysia) Shahrul Hisham Romali
Assistant coach 2	(Malaysia) Mohd Zaki Mohamad @ Mohd Zin
Goalkeeping coach	(Malaysia) Syaifulnizam Khirudin
Fitness coach	(Malaysia) Hamizar Hamzah
Assistant Fitness Coach	(Malaysia) Mohd Asmadi Rosdi
Physio	(Malaysia) Nursuliana Mohd Sofian
Assistant physio	(Malaysia) Ahmad Muis
Kitman	(Malaysia) Mohd Faizal
