= MOF F.C. =

Malaysian football club

MOF
- Full name: Ministry of Finance Football Club
- Short name: MOFFC
- Founded: 15 January 2014; 12 years ago
- Ground: INSPEN Stadium
- Capacity: 3,000
- Owner: Ministry of Finance
- President: Irwan Serigar
- Head coach: Manzoor Azwira
- League: Malaysia FAM League
- 2017: 4th, group A

The Ministry of Finance Football Club was a football club based in Putrajaya, Malaysia. They last played in the third-tier Malaysia FAM League. The football section was managed under the sports and recreational club of Malaysian Ministry of Finance, the Khazanah Treasury Club.

== Players (2019) ==
=== First team squad ===
As of 7 January 2019

Note: Flags indicate national team as defined under FIFA eligibility rules; some limited exceptions apply. Players may hold more than one non-FIFA nationality.

No.	Pos.	Nation	Player
1	GK	MAS	Ezad Ariff Jamaluddin
2	FW	MAS	Abdul Manaf Mamat
3	DF	MAS	Farid Azmi
4	DF	MAS	Norhizwan Hassan
5	DF	MAS	Fauzannazhif Zulkifli
6	MF	MAS	Iskandar Hanapiah
7	MF	MAS	Daniel Ong Ern Min
8	MF	MAS	Hardi Jaafar
9	MF	MAS	Gan Jay Han
10	FW	MAS	Failee Ghazli
11	MF	MAS	Famirul Asraf Sayuti
12	DF	MAS	Najmi Iman
13	GK	MAS	Jibrail Kamaron

No.	Pos.	Nation	Player
16	MF	MAS	Saiful Rahman
18	MF	MAS	Naufal Na'im
19	MF	MAS	Ezrie Shafizie
20	MF	MAS	Akhir Bahari
21	MF	MAS	Aliff Mazlan
22	GK	MAS	Wan Ahmad Hababa
23	GK	MAS	Zairi Hafiezi
24	FW	MAS	Nuruddin Yusof
25	FW	MAS	Afzal Nazri
27	MF	MAS	Fazli Zullkifli
29	DF	MAS	Syazwan Roslan (captain)
30	DF	MAS	Nicholas Wee Shen Ming

=== Transfers ===
For recent transfers, see List of Malaysian football transfers 2018 and List of Malaysian football transfers summer 2016

== Team officials (2017) ==
Position	Name
President	Irwan Serigar
Deputy president	Asri Hamidon
Honorary secretary	Shamsul Azri Abu Bakar
Team manager	Ezleezan Othman
Head coach	Manzoor Azwira
Assistant coach	Abd Ghani Long
Goalkeeper Coach	Abd Rasid Johari
Fitness coach	Zahidibudiman Ibrahim
Physio	Mohd Azrilreza Azman
Media officer	Muhammad Kamal Othman
Kitman	Yusof Mohamad

== Head coaches/team managers ==
Years	Name
2013	Wan Jamak Wan Hasan
2014	Abdul Wahid Ahmad
2015	Dato' Bukhari Hasan
2016	Mohd Hazwan Zahari
2017	Ezleezan Othman
2014–June 2015	Abdul Jalil Ramli
June 2015	Hashim Mustapha
5 December 2015 – 30 November 2016	Zahasmi Ismail
December 2016–December 2017	S. Balachandran
December 2017–April 2018	Razip Ismail
2018	Manzoor Azwira

== See also ==
- MOF-Sungai Merab
