= Hariri Safii =

Malaysian footballer

Hariri Mohd Safii
Personal information
- Full name: Mohd Hariri Bin Mohd Safii
- Date of birth: 18 January 1989 (age 37)
- Place of birth: Kuala Terengganu, Terengganu, Malaysia
- Height: 1.70 m (5 ft 7 in)
- Position: Defender

Team information
- Current team: Terengganu City

Youth career
- 2005 – 2007: Terengganu President's Cup Team

Senior career*
Years	Team	Apps	(Gls)
2008	Harimau Muda		
2009	UPB-My Team	10	(0)
2010	Terengganu	4	(0)
2011	Sabah	17	(0)
2012	Terengganu		
2013	Kedah	6	(0)
2014	Penang	19	(0)
2016–2017	Negeri Sembilan	26	(0)
2018–	Terengganu City	0	(0)
- * Club domestic league appearances and goals as of 25 December 2017 ‡ National team caps and goals as of 24 January 2017

Hariri Mohd Safii (born 18 January 1989) is a Terengganu footballer and currently playing for Terengganu City in Malaysia FAM League.
