= Zairul Fitree Ishak =

Malaysian footballer (born 1985)

Zairul Fitree
Personal information
- Full name: Zairul Fitree bin Ishak
- Date of birth: 4 February 1985 (age 41)
- Place of birth: Kota Bharu, Kelantan, Malaysia
- Height: 1.73 m (5 ft 8 in)
- Position: Left-back

Team information
- Current team: Kelantan The Real Warriors (assistant)

Youth career
- 2004–2005: Kelantan U21

Senior career*
Years	Team	Apps	(Gls)
2005–2006	Kelantan	58	(12)
2007–2008	Kedah	44	(14)
2009–2017	Kelantan	47	(6)
2018	Marcerra Kuantan		
2018–2022	D'AR Wanderers		

International career^{‡}
2005–2006	Malaysia U21	6	(0)

Managerial career
- 2022–2025: Kelantan The Real Warriors U21 (assistant head coach)
- 2025–: Kelantan The Real Warriors (assistant)
- * Club domestic league appearances and goals ‡ National team caps and goals as of March 24, 2016

Zairul Fitree bin Ishak (born 4 February 1985) is a Malaysian former professional footballer who played as a left back. Born and raised in Kota Bharu, Zairul began his career with Kelantan youth team. His senior debut came in 2005. He later was assistant coach of Kelantan The Real Warriors.

== Club career ==
=== Kedah ===
In October 2007, Zairul signed a two-year contract with Kedah under Azraai Khor.

=== Kelantan ===
Zairul helped Kelantan get the third place in the 2007–08 Malaysia Premier League.

== Coaching career ==
Zairul started his coaching career with Kelantan The Real Warriors in 2022.

== Career statistics ==
As of 9 September 2017

Club	Season	League		FA Cup		Malaysia Cup		AFC Cup		Total	
Club	Season	Apps	Goals	Apps	Goals	Apps	Goals	Apps	Goals	Apps	Goals
Kelantan	2006–07		1								
Kelantan	Total										
Kedah	2007–08										
Kedah	Total										
Kelantan	2009	3*	3		0		0	–			3
Kelantan	2010	2*	1					–			1
Kelantan	2011	22	0		0		0	–			0
Kelantan	2012	4	1	7	0	9	0	5	0	25	1
Kelantan	2013	19	1	3	0	8	0	3	0	33	1
Kelantan	2014	3	0	0	0	0	0	5	0	8	0
Kelantan	2015	4	0	2	0	2	0	–		8	0
Kelantan	2016	5	0	1	0	2	0	–		8	0
Kelantan	2017	3	0	1	0	1	0	–		5	0
Kelantan	Total	47	6	14	0	22	0	13	0	82	6

== Honours ==
=== Kedah ===
- Piala Malaysia: 2007, 2008
- Piala FA: 2007, 2008
- Liga Super: 2007, 2008
- Piala Sumbangsih: Runner-up 2008

=== Kelantan ===
- Piala Presiden:2005
- Liga Super: 2011, 2012; Runner-up 2010
- Piala Malaysia: 2010, 2012; Runner-up 2009, 2013
- Piala FA: 2012, 2013
- Piala Sumbangsih: 2011; Runner-up 2012, 2013
