= Izzaq Faris Ramlan =

Malaysian footballer

Izzaq Faris
Personal information
- Full name: Izzaq Faris bin Ramlan
- Date of birth: 18 April 1990 (age 36)
- Place of birth: Kemaman, Terengganu, Malaysia
- Height: 1.88 m (6 ft 2 in)
- Position: Forward

Team information
- Current team: Real Chukai FC
- Number: 25

Youth career
- 2005–2006: T-Team President Cup

Senior career*
Years	Team	Apps	(Gls)
2007–2008	T-Team		
2008–2013	Harimau Muda A		
2014–2015	Terengganu		
2016	T–Team	8	(1)
2017	Melaka United	5	(1)
2018	Terengganu City	10	(3)
2019–	Batu Dua		

International career^{‡}
2009–2011	Malaysia U-21		
2010–2013	Malaysia U-23		
2010–2011	Malaysia	5	(0)
Medal record
Malaysia under-23
Sea Games
Gold medal – first place	Sea Games 2011	Football
Malaysia
Asean Football Championship
Winner	AFF Suzuki Cup 2010	2010
- * Club domestic league appearances and goals as of March 20, 2019 ‡ National team caps and goals as of September 07, 2016

Izzaq Faris Ramlan (born 18 April 1990, in Kemaman, Terengganu), is a Malaysian footballer who currently plays for Malaysian club Batu Dua as a forward. He was called up by Malaysia 2009 coach K. Rajagobal for their friendly match in Turkey in 2010. Izzaq also played with Harimau Muda in Slovakia and after several good matches with Harimau Muda he was called up for the Malaysian team which participated in the 2010 Asian Games.

In November 2010, Izzaq was called up to the Malaysia national squad by coach K. Rajagopal for the 2010 AFF Suzuki Cup. Malaysia won the 2010 AFF Suzuki Cup title for the first time in their history. He was the Harimau Muda A top scorer in the 2011 Malaysia Super League with 9 goal from 16 appearances.

== Honours ==
Club

T-Team

- Malaysia FAM League: 2008

Terengganu City

- Malaysia FAM League: 2018

International

Malaysia U23

- Southeast Asian Games: 2011

Malaysia

- AFF Suzuki Cup: 2010
