= Danial Fadzly Abdullah =

Malaysian former footballer

Danial Fadzly
Personal information
- Full name: Danial Fadzly bin Abdullah
- Date of birth: 14 January 1979 (age 47)
- Place of birth: Kedah, Malaysia
- Positions: Midfielder; defender

Youth career
- Kedah FA

Senior career*
| Years | Team | Apps | (Gls) |
| 2004–2005 | Kedah FA | | |
| 2006–2008 | Perak FA | | |
| 2009 | Perlis FA | | |
| 2010 | ATM FA | | |
| 2011 | Kelantan FA | | |
| 2012 | ATM FA | | |
| 2013 | Penang FA | | |
- * Club domestic league appearances and goals as of 24 May 2011

Danial Fadzly Abdullah (born 14 January 1979) is a Malaysian former footballer. He can operate as a midfielder or defender.

He is of Malaysian Siamese heritage. Formerly a Buddhist under the name Wirat Nom (Thai: วิรัตน์ หนุ่ม, RTGS: Wirat Num), he converted to Islam in 2004 and has taken the name Danial Fadzly.
