= Daudsu Jamaludin =

Malaysian professional footballer

Personal information
- Full name: Mohd Daudsu Bin Jamaludin
- Date of birth: 18 March 1985 (age 41)
- Place of birth: Kota Bharu, Kelantan, Malaysia
- Height: 1.65 m (5 ft 5 in)
- Position: Right-back

Youth career
- 2002–2003: Kelantan FA U21

Senior career*
Years	Team	Apps	(Gls)
2003–2004	TNB Kelantan		
2005–2008	Johor FC	18	(0)
2009–2013	Kelantan	76	(2)
2014–2015	Johor Darul Ta'zim	15	(0)
2016–2017	Kelantan	18	(0)
2018	Mercerra Kuantan	4	(0)
2018	D'AR Wanderers	12	(0)
2019–2020	Kelantan United	26	(0)

International career^{‡}
2006–2008	Malaysia U-23	15	(0)
2007–2008	Malaysia	9	(0)
- * Club domestic league appearances and goals ‡ National team caps and goals as of January 27, 2016

Mohd Daudsu Bin Jamaludin (born 18 March 1985) is a Malaysian professional footballer who plays as a right back.

Daudsu made his debut with the Malaysia national team in the 2010 World Cup qualifying Asian zone against Bahrain on 21 October 2007 at Bahrain National Stadium, Manama. In August 2007, Daudsu was one of the pillars in Malaysia Under-23 team that won the 2007 Merdeka Tournament.

== Club career ==
=== Johor FC ===
Daudsu was part of Johor FC team from 2006/07 and 2007/08 season. He returned to Kelantan FA after finishing his contract with Johor. Best Achievement Daudsu with Johor are leading the team to the semi-finals of the 2008 Malaysia Cup.

=== Kelantan FA ===
During 2011 Malaysia FA Cup final while playing against Terengganu Daudsu accidentally scored an own goal in the last minutes of the match after his team already leads by 1–0. Nordin Alias scored the winning goal for Terengganu. He helped Kelantan gain the treble in 2012 by winning 2012 Malaysia FA Cup, 2012 Malaysia Super League and 2012 Malaysia Cup. He also part of Kelantan winning squad during 2013 Malaysia FA Cup won in the final against the newly rebuild team, Johor Darul Ta'zim which he later joined for 2 seasons.

=== Johor Darul Ta'zim F.C. ===
During 2014 and 2015 Malaysia Super League seasons, Daudsu playing for Johor Darul Ta'zim F.C. He rarely played on the team and ended up making no appearances in 2014 season and making 4 appearances in 2015 season. He made his debut with the team in the 2015 AFC Champions League qualifying play-off against Bangkok Glass which his team lost 3–0.

=== Return to Kelantan FA ===
In 2016, Daudsu returned to his former team to give Kelantan much-needed experience after a successful two-year stint with Johor Darul Ta'zim.

== Statistics ==
=== Club ===
As of 28 October 2017

Performance			League		Cup		League Cup		Continental		Total	
Season	Club	League	Apps	Goals	Apps	Goals	Apps	Goals	Apps	Goals	Apps	Goals
2010	Kelantan	Liga Super	1	1	0	0	0	0	-	-	1	1
2011	Kelantan	Liga Super	22	0	0	0	0	0	-	-	22	0
2012	Kelantan	Liga Super	10	1	0	0	0	0	-	-	10	1
2013	Kelantan	Liga Super	17	0	0	0	3	0	-	-	20	0
Total			50	2	0	0	3	0	0	0	53	0
2014	Johor	Liga Super	0	0	0	0	0	0	0	0	0	0
2015	Johor	Liga Super	2	0	0	0	0	0	2	0	4	0
Total			2	0	0	0	0	0	2	0	4	0
2016	Kelantan	Liga Super	12	0	2	0	2	0	-	-	16	0
2017	Kelantan	Liga Super	6	0	1	0	1	0	-	-	8	0
Total			18	0	3	0	3	0	0	0	24	0

=== International ===
As of 11 October 2016.

National team	Year	Apps	Goals
Malaysia
Malaysia	2007	7	0
Malaysia	2008	2	0
Malaysia	Total	9	0

== Honours ==
=== Club honours ===
Johor Darul Takzim

- Piala Sumbangsih: 2015
- Liga Super (2): 2014, 2015
- 2014 Piala Malaysia: Runner up
- 2015 AFC Cup

Johor FC

- Liga Super 3rd place: 2007-08

Kelantan FA

- Liga Super: 2011, 2012; Runner-up 2010
- Piala Malaysia: 2010, 2012; Runner-up 2009
- Piala FA: 2012, 2013; Runner-up 2011, 2009
- Piala Sumbangsih: 2011; Runner-up 2012
- Piala Emas Raja-Raja: 2005, 2009, 2010; Runner-up 2006
