= Marcerra United F.C. =

Malaysian football club

Marcerra United
- Full name: Marcerra United Football Club
- Founded: 2012; 14 years ago
- Dissolved: 2019
- Ground: USIM Mini Stadium
- Capacity: 10,000
- Chairman: Mohamad Feardaus

Marcerra United Football Club was a football club based in Kuala Lumpur. The club last competed in the Malaysia FAM League, the third tier of the Malaysian football league, in 2018.

The club also competed in the Kuala Lumpur League, a state league. In 2018, the management of Marcerra United has taken over the Malaysia Premier League club Kuantan FA, renaming to Marcerra Kuantan FA.

As a result of financial problems, Marcerra United pulled out of the 2018 Malaysia FAM Cup on 20 July, with the results expunged from the league. They shared the fate of Kuantan, who pulled out of 2018 Malaysia Premier League with the same financial issue.

== Final squad ==
Note: Flags indicate national team as defined under FIFA eligibility rules; some limited exceptions apply. Players may hold more than one non-FIFA nationality.

No.	Pos.	Nation	Player
1	GK	MAS	Mohd Jailani Abdullah
2	DF	MAS	Izer Hamkha Haizal
4	MF	MAS	Alif Najmi Ahmad
6	FW	MAS	Rusmanizam Roseland
7	FW	MAS	Nabilah Khan Razali
8	MF	MAS	Syahmi Syakir Salim
9	MF	MAS	Asyraf Abdul Talib
10	FW	MAS	Terence a/l Marieselvam
11	MF	MAS	Hazuan Daud
12	MF	MAS	Nur Rizzham Norman
13	DF	MAS	Syuhiran Zainal
14	DF	MAS	Haziq Fikri Hussein

No.	Pos.	Nation	Player
16	DF	MAS	Ibrahim Aziz
18	MF	MAS	Ahmad Nordin Alias
19	DF	MAS	Azman Othman
20	DF	MAS	Isskandar Zukarnaen (captain)
21	DF	MAS	Norfahmie Hadzrin
22	FW	MAS	Isma Alif Mohd Salim
23	GK	MAS	Syafizullah Ab Wahab
24	MF	MAS	Meor Nasrullah
25	MF	MAS	Hazim Amir Hamzah
27	FW	MAS	Izzam Izzudin Mohd Zamri
30	GK	MAS	Mursyidin Maudoode
