= Famirul Asraf Sayuti =

Malaysian footballer

Famirul Asraf
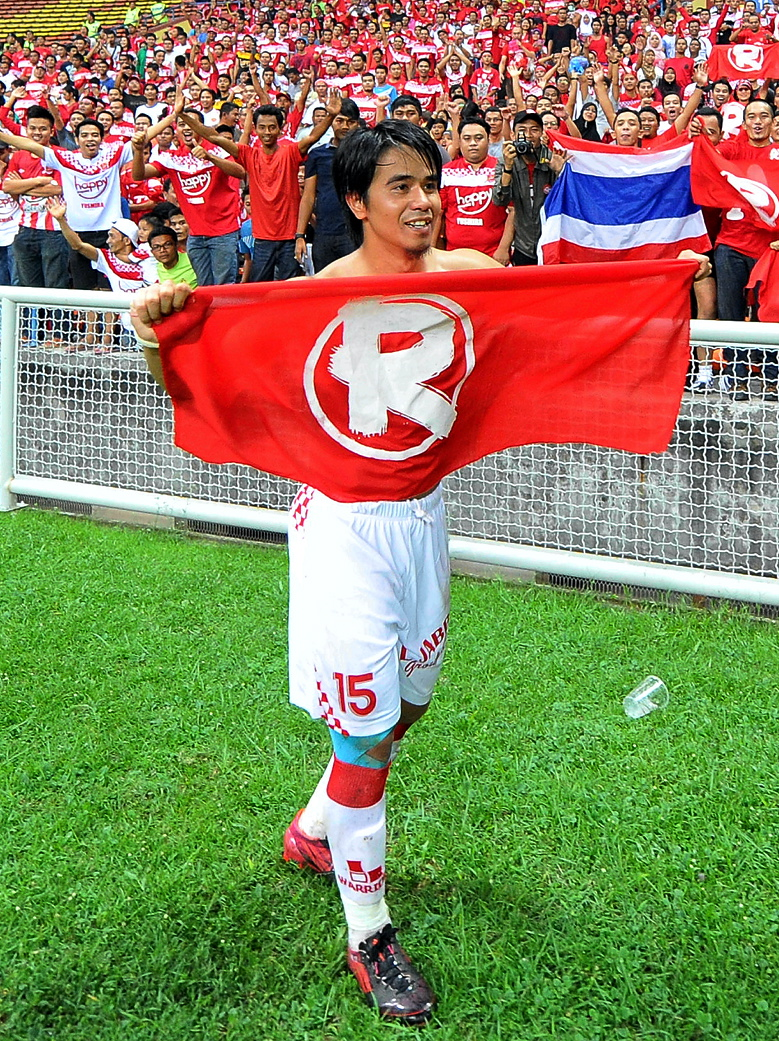
- Famirul Asraf in 2012

Personal information
- Full name: Famirul Asraf bin Sayuti
- Date of birth: 17 November 1989 (age 36)
- Place of birth: Pasir Mas, Kelantan, Malaysia
- Height: 1.67 m (5 ft 6 in)
- Positions: Midfielder; forward

Team information
- Current team: Kelantan United
- Number: 11

Senior career*
Years	Team	Apps	(Gls)
2009	Kuala Muda Naza	0	(0)
2010–2011	Pahang	25	(5)
2012	Selangor	1	(1)
2013	Sime Darby	0	(0)
2014–2015	Kelantan	0	(0)
2015	→ Melaka United (loan)	0	(0)
2016–2017	Perlis FA	13	(1)
2018	MOF F.C.	4	(2)
2019–	Kelantan United	25	(0)

International career^{‡}
2011	Malaysia	1	(0)
- * Club domestic league appearances and goals as of 17 March 2019 ‡ National team caps and goals as of 21:14, 27 November 2013

Famirul Asraf bin Sayuti (born 17 November 1989) is a Malaysian footballer who plays for Kelantan United in Malaysia M3 League. He is among 29 player that was called by Malaysia XI to play against Chelsea F.C. on 21 July 2011

== Honours ==
Selangor FA

- The Sultan of Selangor's Cup:2012

Sime Darby F.C.

- Malaysia Premier League:Runner Up 2013

== Personal life ==
He has a brother named Faizol Nazlin Sayuti who currently plays for Kelantan FA.
