= Zairo Anuar =

Malaysian footballer

Personal information
- Full name: Zairo Anuar bin Zalani
- Date of birth: 18 June 1982 (age 44)
- Place of birth: Terengganu, Malaysia
- Height: 1.71 m (5 ft 7 in)
- Position: Midfielder

Team information
- Current team: Hanelang
- Number: 7

Senior career*
Years	Team	Apps	(Gls)
2001–2010	Terengganu	72	(11)
2010–2012	T-Team	58	(20)
2012–2013	Kelantan	29	(2)
2013–2016	Terengganu	38	(4)
2017	Terengganu City	16	(4)
2018–	Hanelang	3	(0)

International career^{‡}
2005	Malaysia U-23	5	(1)
2008	Malaysia XI	1	(0)
2006	Malaysia	6	(0)
- * Club domestic league appearances and goals as of 8 April 2018 ‡ National team caps and goals as of 12 April 2013

Zairo Anuar bin Zalani (born 18 June 1982) is a Malaysian football player currently plays for Hanelang in the Malaysia FAM League. Zairo plays mainly as central midfielder but can also play as an attacking midfielder. He is known for having a powerful shot and has turned that into valuable goals for his teams.

== Club career ==
=== Terengganu FA ===
He started his professional career at Terengganu in 2001, playing for the team for 9 seasons. After that, he moved to T-Team which also based in Terengganu, in 2010.

=== T-Team FC ===
He was a captain for his time while playing for T-Team. Zairo was top local goal scorer in 2012. He scored 13 goals in 2012 Malaysia Super League.

=== Kelantan FA ===
During 2013 Malaysia Super League season, Zairo has signed a contract with Malaysia top club, Kelantan. On 5 January, he made his debut with the team during Charity Cup. Unfortunately, Kelantan lose to ATM during that match. During 2013 AFC Cup 4th match against SHB Đà Nẵng the absence of Badhri Radzi and Shakir Shaari in the middle of the park slightly effects the team performance. Despite missing the key players, credit should be given to Zairo who did slot through a superb pass to Dickson Nwakaeme before the Nigerian slot home to give the 1–0 lead to the team in the 73rd minute.

== Honours ==
=== Club ===
==== Kelantan ====
- Malaysia Cup: Runner-up 2013
- Malaysia FA Cup: 2013
- Malaysia Charity Shield: Runner-up 2013

Malaysia

- SEA Games: (bronze) Bronze 2005

== Style of play ==
Zairo is a free kick specialist. He also able to make the right pass to his teammate and create chances to score a goal.

== International career ==
Zairo was part of the Malaysia U-23 team who participated in the 2005 SEA Games that win the bronze medal. He then made his international senior debut against New Zealand national team on 19 February 2006.

In 2008, he appeared for the Malaysia selection in an exhibition match against Chelsea, coming on as a second-half substitute for Hardi Jaafar.
