= KDMM F.C. =

Malaysian football club

KDMM FC
- Full name: Kadazan Dusun Murut Malaysia Football Club
- Founded: 2016; 9 years ago
- Dissolved: 2018
- Ground: Kompleks Sukan Keningau
- Capacity: 10,000
- President: Peter Anthony
- Manager: Andrew Majanggim

Kadazan Dusun Murut Malaysia Football Club or KDMM FC was a Malaysian football club based in Keningau, Sabah. Founded in 2016, the club's home ground has been Keningau Stadium. The club represented the Kadazan-Dusun and Murut ethnic communities in Malaysian football competitions.

== History ==
Kadazan Dusun Murut Malaysia Football Club was founded in 2016 by the owner Peter Anthony as part of its effort to bring the ethnics unity together through the sports of football. The club was accepted to play in 2016 Malaysia FAM League and has finished the league in fourth place, competing in the playoff quarter-final. For the second season, 2017 Malaysia FAM League, the club only retained half of the old squad and has held a trial session for new recruits.

== Stadium ==
KDMM FC played their home matches in the 10,000 capacity Keningau Stadium, while the club played their first participation in the FA Cup home matches in Likas Stadium.

== Players (2017) ==
=== First-team squad ===
No.	Name	Nationality	Position(s)	D.O.B
Goalkeepers
1	Shairul Boidi	(Malaysia)	GK	5/7/89
22	Aldrian Agus	(Malaysia)	GK	31/10/94
30	Presley Lim Chin Fong	(Malaysia)	GK	26/2/96
Defenders
2	Hardy Charles Parsi (captain)	(Malaysia)	CB, LB	10/4/87
4	Billy Doliente	(Malaysia)	CB	9/4/92
15	Rickson Pang Tabias	(Malaysia)	CB	30/11/96
21	Josesua Jubin	(Malaysia)	LB/LM/LW	8/7/95
24	Ahmad Sabri Ahmad Durayah	(Malaysia)	RB, RWB	11/7/95
26	Mohd Zulfadhlisham Roseland	(Malaysia)	CB, RB	13/9/95
27	Azizul Madirin	(Malaysia)	RB, RWB	5/12/87
28	Mohd Ikhmal Akid Bahari	(Malaysia)	LB, LWB, LM	28/7/95
Midfielders
3	Rick Marseel Gueh	(Malaysia)	CM / DM	27/6/95
6	Saiful Sani	(Malaysia)	CM	21/1/95
7	Mohd Arfiyansah Abdul Jafar	(Malaysia)	CM	30/3/90
10	Rexjeson Pitirus	(Malaysia)	RM, RW / LM, LW	26/4/92
14	Melky Balang	(Malaysia)	AM, CM	1993
18	Aldrine Agus	(Malaysia)	CM	1991
19	Fneckly Baris	(Malaysia)	LM, LW	20/11/92
20	Felexsius Amil	(Malaysia)	CM, AM	26/5/90
25	Mohd Helmi Sudin	(Malaysia)	DM/CM	1987
Forwards
13	Yazili Yunat	(Malaysia)	ST	24/3/88
17	Klinsmon Aribulan	(Malaysia)	ST	1995
23	Shafie Talip	(Malaysia)	ST	31/1/94

Source: Source:

== Club personnel (2017) ==
- Chairman: Datuk Peter Anthony
- Manager: Henry Soimpon
- Assistant manager: Ebby Roy Raimon
- Head coach: Andrew Majanggim
- Assistant coach: Silvester Sindih
- Fitness coach: Jorrye Jakiwa
- Goalkeeping coach: Austin Orou, Rizal Awang Jad
- Physio: James Edwin
