= Terengganu City F.C. =

Terengganu City
- Full name: Terengganu City Football Club
- Nickname: The Sharks
- Short name: TCFC
- Founded: June 2016; 10 years ago
- Dissolved: 2019
- League: Malaysia FAM League

Terengganu City Football Club was a Malaysian football club based in Kuala Terengganu, Terengganu. The club played in the third-tier league of Malaysian football, the Malaysia FAM League from 2017.

== History ==
The club was founded in June 2016 as Terengganu City Football Club.

In the 2018, Terengganu City won the championship in their inaugural season, after beating Selangor United 2–0 at the KLFA Stadium. As finalist together with Selangor United, The Sharks qualified for automatic promotion into the Malaysia Premier League.

However, on 28 November 2018, Malaysia Football League barred Terengganu City from participating in the 2019 Malaysia Premier League, as a result of financial problems within the team's management and claims of several players and staff for unpaid wages.

== Season by season record ==
Season	League									Top goalscorer		FA Cup	Malaysia Cup
Season	Division	P	W	D	L	F	A	Pts	Pos	Name	Goals	FA Cup	Malaysia Cup
2017	Malaysia FAM League	12	6	3	3	13	12	21	3rd Group B			DNQ	DNQ
2018	Malaysia FAM League	8	6	0	2	12	7	18	1st			First round	DNQ

== 2018 squad ==
Note: Flags indicate national team as defined under FIFA eligibility rules; some limited exceptions apply. Players may hold more than one non-FIFA nationality.

No.	Pos.	Nation	Player
2	MF	MAS	Asysham Asri
3	DF	MAS	Shafiquddin Ibrahim
5	MF	MAS	Adhar Hussin
6	MF	MAS	Mohammad Sollihin
7	DF	MAS	Zulhairi Ismail
9	MF	MAS	Naim Asyraff
10	MF	MAS	Zailan Mohammad
11	GK	MAS	Muslim Yusof
12	DF	MAS	Fadzlihadi Mamat
14	FW	MAS	Izzaq Faris Ramlan
16	MF	MAS	Norhafizzuan Jailani
22	GK	MAS	Sani Anuar Kamsani
23	MF	MAS	Jasmir Mehat

No.	Pos.	Nation	Player
24	DF	MAS	Zahieruddin Zakaria
26	DF	MAS	Sabri Adam
28	DF	MAS	Dzaiddin Zanudin
29	DF	MAS	Lee Yong Cheng
30	FW	MAS	Rahizi Razib
—	DF	MAS	Hariri Mohd Safii
—	DF	MAS	Wan Azwari
—	DF	MAS	Hafiszuan Salehuddin

=== Transfers ===
For recent transfers, see List of Malaysian football transfers 2018

== Club staff ==
As of 30 December 2017

Team Management
Role	Nat	Name
President	(Malaysia)	Mohd Johan Ismail
Technical director	(Malaysia)	Che Ku Marzuki
Team manager	(Malaysia)	Mohd Norhisham Hassan
Head coach	(Malaysia)	Roshaidi Wahab
Assistant coach	(Malaysia)	Md. Nor Derus
Goalkeeping coach	(Malaysia)	Zulkipli Ismail
Fitness coach	(Malaysia)	Shafib Salmi Muda
Physiotherapist	(Indonesia)	Fortunella Levyana

== Honours ==
=== League ===
- Malaysia FAM League
  - Winners (1): 2018
