= Mohd Hashim Mustapha =

Malaysian footballer (1966–2022)

Hashim Mustapha
Personal information
- Full name: Mohd Hashim bin Mustapha
- Date of birth: 31 January 1966
- Place of birth: Kelantan, Malaysia
- Date of death: 29 November 2022 (aged 56)
- Position: Striker

Youth career
- 1980–1982: Kelantan

Senior career*
Years	Team	Apps	(Gls)
1984–1995	Kelantan	95	(60)
1996–1997	Kedah		
1998	Kelantan		
1999	Johor		
2000	Kelantan JKR FC		
2000	Kelantan TNB FC		

International career
1987–1994	Malaysia	9	(1)

Managerial career
- 2008: Kelantan U21
- 2010-2015: Kelantan (assistant coach)
- 2015: Kelantan (chief scout)
- 2015–2016: MOF
- 2016–2017: Kelantan U21
- 2017–2018: D'AR Wanderers
- * Club domestic league appearances and goals

Mohd Hashim Mustapha (31 January 1966 – 29 November 2022) was a Malaysian professional footballer who played as a striker.

== Career ==
Hashim was born in Kota Bharu, Kelantan. In the period from the 1980s until 2000, he played for several Malaysian clubs such as Kelantan, Kedah, Johor, Kelantan JKR FC and Kelantan TNB FC as a striker.

Hashim is Malaysia Premier League golden boot winner in 1994 season with 29 goals in 30 matches.

With Malaysia, Hashim made his international debut against Burma during the 1987 Southeast Asian Games. In the same competition, he scored his only international goal in a 2–0 semi final win over Thailand. He also participated in the 1994 Asian Games.

After he retired from playing professional football, Hashim ventured into coaching. He was the coach of D'ar Wanderers in 2018 FAM League.

== Honours ==
Kedah FA

- Malaysia FA Cup: 1996

Johor FA

- Premier 2 League: 1999

Malaysia

- Southeast Asian Games runner-up: 1987

Individual

- Malaysian League Golden Boot: 1993 (13 goals), 1994 (25 goals)
