= Temerloh Mini Stadium =

Stadium in Temerloh, Pahang, Malaysia

Stadium Majlis Perbandaran Temerloh
- Stadium Temerloh
- Interactive map of Stadium Majlis Perbandaran Temerloh
- Coordinates: 3°26′46″N 102°25′22″E
- Owner: Majlis Perbandaran Temerloh
- Surface: Grass pitch Track

Construction
- Opened: 1997
- Renovated: 2012

Tenants
- Felda United; Shahzan Muda FC; Sri Pahang FC; D'AR Wanderers; Armed Forces; Semantan Troopers

Stadium Majlis Perbandaran Temerloh, also known as Stadium Temerloh, is a multi-purpose stadium located in Temerloh, Pahang, Malaysia. It is currently used mostly for football matches, with a capacity of 10,000 seats. The stadium has a running track, in addition to the football field.

== Events hosted ==
- Piala FAM
- Final Piala Emas Raja-Raja 2011
- Liga Perdana 1
- Pesta Bola Merdeka 2013
- Liga Super 2024/2025

== See also ==
- Sport in Malaysia
