= Ahmad Nordin Alias =

Malaysian footballer

Nordin Alias
Personal information
- Full name: Ahmad Nordin Bin Alias
- Date of birth: 26 October 1985 (age 41)
- Place of birth: Terengganu, Malaysia
- Height: 1.79 m (5 ft 10 1/2 in)
- Position: Defensive midfielder

Team information
- Current team: Marcerra United F.C.
- Number: 18

Youth career
- Terengganu FA President Cup

Senior career*
Years	Team	Apps	(Gls)
2009–2016	Terengganu	144	(4)
2017	Pahang	1	(0)
2018–	Marcerra United F.C.	0	(0)
- * Club domestic league appearances and goals as of January 26, 2018 ‡ National team caps and goals as of January 25, 2017

Ahmad Nordin Bin Alias (born 26 October 1985 in Terengganu) is a Malaysian footballer last played for Marcerra United F.C. in Malaysia FAM League. Nordin is Kuala Muda Naza former player. He captained Terengganu in 2015.

Ahmad Nordin appeared Terengganu FA hero team in the Malaysia FA Cup 2011 final tournament when it managed to score a 2-1 victory to Kelantan FA.

Nordin was born in Medan Jaya, Marang, Terengganu. He joined Terengganu in 2008.

== Career statistics ==
=== Club ===
As of match played 28 October 2017.

Appearances and goals by club, season and competition
Club	Season	League			Cup		League Cup		Continental		Total	
Club	Season	Division	Apps	Goals	Apps	Goals	Apps	Goals	Apps	Goals	Apps	Goals
Terengganu	2007–08	Liga Super	0	0	0	0	0	0	–		0	0
Terengganu	2009	Liga Super	0	1	0	0	0	0	–		0	0
Terengganu	2010	Liga Super	0	1	0	0	0	0	–		0	0
Terengganu	2011	Liga Super	24	0	0	0	0	0	–		0	0
Terengganu	2012	Liga Super	4	1	0	0	0	0	0	0	0	0
Terengganu	2013	Liga Super	19	0	5	1	2	0	–		26	1
Terengganu	2014	Liga Super	21	0	2	0	8	1	–		31	1
Terengganu	2015	Liga Super	22	0	5	0	6	0	–		34	0
Terengganu	2016	Liga Super	14	1	0	0	0	0	–		0	0
Terengganu	Total		0	0	0	0	0	0	–	–	0	0
Pahang	2017	Liga Super	1	0	0	0	0	0	–		1	0
Pahang	Total		1	0	0	0	0	0	–	–	1	0
Career Total			0	0	0	0	0	0	–	–	0	0
