= List of Malaysian football transfers 2017 =

The following is a list of transfers for 2017 Malaysian football.

== Malaysia Super League ==
The 2017 Malaysia Super League (also known as Liga Super Malaysia 2017) is the 14th season of the highest Malaysian football league since its inception in 2004. 12 teams participated in the league with Johor Darul Ta'zim as the defending champions.

The first transfer season start 31 October 2016 to 22 January 2017.

=== FELDA United ===
Head coach: (Malaysia) Azmi Mohamed (1st season)

In:

Date	Pos.	Player	From	Note
December 2016	FWD	(Malaysia) Fazrul Hazli Kadri	(Malaysia) Perak	
November 2016	GK	(Malaysia) Ilham Amirullah Razali	(Malaysia) T–Team	
November 2016	FWD	(Malaysia) Fakrul Aiman Sidid	(Malaysia) PDRM	
November 2016	MF	(Malaysia) Alif Yusof	(Malaysia) JDT II	
November 2016	DF	(Malaysia) Wan Amirul Afiq Wan Ab Rahman	(Malaysia) Melaka United	
November 2016	DF	(Malaysia) Muhd Ilham Yusof	(Malaysia) Kuantan FA	
November 2016	FWD	(Malaysia) Norshahrul Idlan Talaha	(Malaysia) Terengganu FA	
November 2016	FWD	(Malaysia) Wan Zack Haikal	(Malaysia) Kelantan FA	
November 2016	FWD	(Malaysia) Mohd Rafiq Shah Zaim	(Malaysia) Sime Darby F.C.	
November 2016	MF	(Malaysia) Muhd Rizqi Azman	(Malaysia) Sime Darby F.C.	
November 2016	DF	(Malaysia) Mohd Farid Ramli	(Malaysia) PKNS F.C.	
November 2016	ST	(Malaysia) Stuart Wark	(Malaysia) Sabah FA	
January 2017	ST	(Argentina) Gastón Cellerino	(Bolivia) Club Bolívar	
5 January 2017	ST	(Argentina) Lucas Cano	(Argentina) Argentinos Juniors	(Loan)
20 January 2017	DF	(Lebanon) Mootaz El Jounaidi	(Lebanon) Al-Ansar SC	

Out:

Date	Pos.	Player	To	Note
December 2016	DC	(Malaysia) B. Sanjef Dinesh	(Malaysia) JDT II	
December 2016	GK	(Malaysia) Fairul Azwan Shahrullai	(Malaysia) PJ Rangers	
December 2016	FWD	(Malaysia) Mohd Ferris Danial	(Malaysia) Terengganu	
December 2016	DF	(Malaysia) Adib Aizuddin Abdul Latif	(Malaysia) Terengganu	
December 2016	DF	(Malaysia) Mohd Firdaus Faudzi	(Malaysia) Terengganu	
December 2016	MF	(Malaysia) Abdul Shukur Jusoh	(Malaysia) Terengganu	
December 2016	GK	(Malaysia) Mohd Suffian Abdul Rahman	(Malaysia) Terengganu	
December 2016	DLC	(Malaysia) Idris Ahmad	(Malaysia) Perak FA	
December 2016	DLC	(Brazil) Gilberto Alemao	Free agent	
December 2016	AMRL	(Malaysia) Ahmad Syamim Yahya	(Malaysia) Pahang FA	
December 2016	AML	(Malaysia) D. Christie Jayaseelan	(Malaysia) Pahang FA	
December 2016	AMRC	(Malaysia) S. Sivanesan	(Malaysia) PKNS F.C.	
December 2016	MC	(Malaysia) Ahmad Ezrie Shafizie	(Malaysia) Terengganu FA	
December 2016	ST	(Malaysia) Bobby Gonzales	(Malaysia) PKNS F.C.	
December 2016	FWD	(Liberia) Francis Doe	(Malaysia) Selangor FA	
December 2016	FWD	(Brazil) Thiago Augusto Fernandes	(Bahrain) Manama Club	
8 January 2017	DMC	(Uzbekistan) Lutfulla Turaev	(Malaysia) Terengganu FA	

=== Johor Darul Ta'zim ===
Manager / head coach: (Mexico) Benjamin Mora (1st season)

In:

Date	Pos.	Player	From	Note
November 2016	MF	(Malaysia) Mohd Afiq Fazail	(Malaysia) JDT II	
November 2016	FWD	(Malaysia) (England) Darren Lok Yee Deng	(Malaysia) JDT II	
November 2016	FWD	(Malaysia) Safawi Rasid	(Malaysia) T-Team F.C.	
November 2016	FWD	(Malaysia) Ahmad Hazwan Bakri	(Malaysia) Selangor	
November 2016	MF	(Malaysia) Nazmi Faiz	(Malaysia) Selangor	
December 2016	FWD	(Iraq) (Argentina) Brian Ferreira	(Argentina) Independiente	
December 2016	MID	(Argentina) Gonzalo Cabrera	(Saudi Arabia) Al-Faisaly FC	
December 2016	MID	(Malaysia) R. Gopinathan	(Malaysia) Selangor FA	
January 2017	FWD	(Argentina) Jerónimo Barrales	(Argentina) Club Atlético Huracán	

Out:

Date	Pos.	Player	To	Note
November 2016	FWD	(Malaysia) Mohd Azinee Taib	(Malaysia) JDT II	
November 2016	MID	(Malaysia) Jasazrin Jamaluddin	(Malaysia) Perak FA	
December 2016	LW	(Malaysia) Nazrin Nawi	(Malaysia) Perak FA	
November 2016	DEF	(Malaysia) Asraruddin Putra Omar	(Malaysia)	
November 2016	GK	(Malaysia) K. Sasi Kumar	(Malaysia) JDT II	
December 2016	MF	(Malaysia) Mohd Amri Yahyah	(Malaysia) Melaka United	
December 2016	FW	(Malaysia) Safee Sali	(Malaysia) PKNS FC	
1/2/2017	MF	(Singapore) Hariss Harun	(Spain) CE L'Hospitalet	Loan
December 2016	FW	(Argentina) Juan Martín Lucero	(Mexico) Club Tijuana	Sold for US$2.5 million
JanuaryNovember 2017	FWD	(Argentina) Jorge Pereyra Díaz	(Mexico) Club León	

=== Kedah ===
Head coach: (Malaysia) Tan Cheng Hoe (4th season)

In:

Date	Pos.	Player	From	Note
November 2016	GK	(Malaysia) Mohd Ifwat Akmal Che Kassim	(Malaysia) Kedah youth system	Promotion
1 December 2016	DF	(Malaysia) Mohd Fitri Omar	(Malaysia) Penang	
1 December 2016	MF	(Malaysia) Muhammad Akram Mahinan	(Malaysia) JDT II	
1 December 2016	GK	(Malaysia) Mohd Suhail Mohd Sofian	(Malaysia) SSBJ	
1 December 2016	DR	(Malaysia) Mohd Izwan Iskandar Gazali	(Malaysia) SSBJ	
1 December 2016	DL	(Malaysia) Zulfakar Khairuddin Zamzuri	(Malaysia) SSBJ	
1 December 2016	DC	(Malaysia) Muhd Al Imran Abdul Halim	(Malaysia) SSBJ	
1 December 2016	MC	(Malaysia) Mohd Syafiq Shamsudin	(Malaysia) SSBJ	
1 December 2016	ST	(Malaysia) Mohd Zulfahamzie Tarmizi	(Malaysia) Selangor U21	
3 January 2017	ST	(Denmark) Ken Ilsø	(Singapore) Home United	
11 January 2017	DC	(Australia) Zac Anderson	(United Arab Emirates) Emirates Club	

Out:

Date	Pos.	Player	To	Note
November 2016	DF	(Malaysia) Azmeer Yusof	(Malaysia) Kuala Lumpur	
November 2016	DF	(Malaysia) Mohd Sabre Mat Abu	(Malaysia) PKNS	
January 2017	DF	(South Korea) Bang Seung-hwan	(Thailand) Royal Thai Navy F.C.	
November 2016	DF	(Malaysia) Shafizan Hashim	Free agent	
November 2016	FW	(Brazil) Thiago Augusto Fernandes	(Malaysia) FELDA United	End of Loan
November 2016	MF	(Malaysia) Amar Rohidan	(Malaysia) PKNS	
November 2016	FW	(New Zealand) Shane Smeltz	(Australia) Wellington Phoenix	
November 2016	GK	(Malaysia) Muhd Syazwan Abdullah	(Malaysia) Melaka United	
November 2016	DF	(Malaysia) Mohamad Alif Fadhil Ismail	Free agent	
November 2016	MF	(Malaysia) Shazuan Ashraf Mathews	(Malaysia) Felcra F.C.	

=== Kelantan ===
Head coach: (Malaysia) Zahasmi Ismail (1season)

In:

Date	Pos.	Player	From	Note
1 Jan 2017	LB/CB	(Malaysia) Mohd Farisham Ismail	(Malaysia) Penang FA	Loan ended
1 Dec 2016	CB	(Malaysia) Faizol Nazlin Sayuti	(Malaysia) MOF F.C.	Loan ended
1 Jan 2017	RB/CB	(Malaysia) Tuan Muhamad Faim	(Malaysia) MOF F.C.	Loan ended
20 Dec 2016	DL	(Malaysia) Mohammad Abdul Aziz Ismail	(Malaysia) Melaka United	
20 Dec 2016	DM/DC	(Malaysia) Hasmizan Kamarodin	(Malaysia) Terengganu FA	
1 Jan 2017	MF	(Malaysia) Mohd Rozaimi Azwar	(Malaysia) MOF F.C.	Loan ended
14 Jan 2017	ST	(Lebanon) Mohammed Ghaddar	(Jordan) Al-Faisaly	
20 Jan 2017	MF	(Malaysia) S. Thinagaran	(Malaysia) PKNS F.C.	
20 Jan 2017	DF	(Malaysia) S. Subramaniam	(Malaysia) Selangor FA	
20 Jan 2017	FW	(Malaysia) Hattaphon Bun An	(Malaysia) Kota Setar FA (LBR)	
20 Jan 2017	CB	(The Gambia) Mamadou Danso	(United States) Rayo OKC	
20 Jan 2017	FW	(Brazil) Alessandro Celin	(Romania) CS Concordia Chiajna	

Out:

Date	Pos.	Player	To
Dec 2016	GK	(Malaysia) Hasbullah Abdul Rahim	(Malaysia) Kelantan U21s
November 2016	FWD	(Malaysia) Wan Zaharulnizam Zakaria	(Malaysia) Pahang FA
December 2016	DF	(Malaysia) Mohd Aiman Shakir Mohd Hashim	(Malaysia) Kelantan U21s
November 2016	DF	(Malaysia) Muslim Ahmad	(Malaysia) Pahang FA
November 2016	MF	(Malaysia) Abdul Manaf Mamat	(Malaysia) Kuala Lumpur FA
November 2016	MF	(Malaysia) Mohd Faizal Abu Bakar	(Malaysia) Negeri Sembilan FA
November 2016	MF	(Malaysia) Brendan Gan	Free agent
November 2016	DF	(Malaysia) Tuan Muhamad Faim	Free agent
November 2016	DF	(Malaysia) Noor Hazrul Mustafa	(Malaysia) Negeri Sembilan
November 2016	MF	(Malaysia) Wan Zack Haikal	(Malaysia) Felda United F.C.
November 2016	ST	(North Macedonia) Baže Ilijoski	(North Macedonia) FK Pelister
November 2016	MF	(Brazil) Wander Luiz	Free agent
November 2016	Head Coach	(Bulgaria) Velizar Popov	Free agent
November 2016	DF	(Australia) Jonathan McKain	(Australia) Souths United FC
Dec 2016	DF	(Malaysia) Mohd Zafran Akramin	(Malaysia) MPKB-BRI U-BeS F.C.
8 Jan 2017	DF	(Malaysia) Muhd Nasharizam Abdul Rashid	(Malaysia) Perlis FA (Loan)
8 Jan 2017	MF	(Malaysia) Amir Zikri Pauzi	(Malaysia) Perlis FA (Loan)
8 Jan 2017	MF	(Malaysia) Mohd Syafiq Abdul Rahman	(Malaysia) Perlis FA (Loan)
December 2016	FW	(Malaysia) Nik Azli Nik Alias	(Malaysia) Kelantan U21s

=== Melaka United ===
Head coach: (Australia) Eric Williams (1st season)

In:

Date	Pos.	Player	From	Note
November 2016	DF	(Ghana) Godwin Antwi	(Malaysia) DRB-HICOM	
November 2016	MF	(Iran) Omid Nazari	(Philippines) Global FC	
November 2016	FW	(Malaysia) Izzaq Faris Ramlan	(Malaysia) T–Team	
November 2016	DF	(Malaysia) Abdul Thaufiq Abdul Haq	(Malaysia) AirAsia F.C.	
November 2016	GK	(Malaysia) Norhadi Ubaidillah	(Malaysia) Kuala Lumpur FA	
November 2016	LW	(Malaysia) Isma Alif Mohd Salim	(Malaysia) Kuala Lumpur FA	
November 2016	DF	(Malaysia) Muhd Nazri Ahmad	(Malaysia) Kuala Lumpur FA	
November 2016	GK	(Malaysia) Muhd Syazwan Abdullah	(Malaysia) Kedah	
November 2016	GK	(Malaysia) Mohd Firdaus Muhamad	(Malaysia) Penang	
November 2016	GK	(Malaysia) Mohd Fazli Paat	(Malaysia) JDT II	
November 2016	MF	(Malaysia) Ahmad Ezrie Shafizie	(Malaysia) Felda Utd	
November 2016	MF	(Malaysia) Mohd Fauzi Roslan	(Malaysia) Pahang FA	
November 2016	DF	(Malaysia) Mohd Faizal Muhammad	(Malaysia) PDRM	
November 2016	MF	(Malaysia) Muhd Khairu Azrin Khazali	(Malaysia) PKNS FC	
November 2016	MF	(Malaysia) Akmal Ishak	(Malaysia) Johor Darul Ta'zim II	
November 2016	MF	(Malaysia) Syed Sobri Syed Mohamad	(Malaysia) Sime Darby	
November 2016	DF	(Malaysia) Mohd Akmal Md Zahir	(Malaysia) Sime Darby	
1 December 2016	MF	(Malaysia) Tam Sheang Tsung	(Japan) Gainare Tottori	
1 December 2016	MF	(Malaysia) Ashvin Tharumanathan	(Australia) University of Queensland FC	
1 December 2016	ST	(Argentina) Sergio Ezequiel Aguero	(Hungary) FC Tatabánya	

Out:

Date	Pos.	Player	To	Note
November 2016	DF	(Romania) Alexandru Tudose	Released	
November 2016	MF	(Sweden) Labinot Harbuzi	Released	
November 2016	ST	(Palestine) Yashir Pinto	(Malaysia) Perak FA	
November 2016	MF	(Malaysia) Ahmad Ezrie Shafizie	(Malaysia) FELDA United	End of Loan
November 2016	MF	(Malaysia) Mohd Ferris Danial	(Malaysia) FELDA United	End of Loan
November 2016	GK	(Malaysia) Muhammad Syazwan Yusoff	(Malaysia) Kelantan	End of Loan
November 2016	DF	(Malaysia) Mohammad Abdul Aziz Ismail	(Malaysia) Kelantan	
November 2016	MF	(Malaysia) See Kok Luen	(Malaysia) PJ Rangers	
November 2016	GK	(Malaysia) Mohd Fadzley Rahim	(Malaysia) PJ Rangers	
November 2016	MF	(Malaysia) Mohd Saiful Mustafa	(Malaysia) PJ Rangers	
November 2016	DF	(Malaysia) Muhd Afiq Azuan	(Malaysia) PJ Rangers	
November 2016	GK	(Malaysia) Ahmad Solehin Mamat	(Malaysia) Kuala Lumpur	
November 2016	DF	(Malaysia) Wan Amirul Afiq Wan Abdul Rahman	(Malaysia) FELDA United	
November 2016	DF	(Malaysia) Fiqri Azwan Ghazali	(Malaysia) FELCRA FC	
November 2016	MF	(Malaysia) Iskandar Hanapiah	(Malaysia) PJ Rangers	
November 2016	MF	(Malaysia) Reeshafiq Alwi	(Malaysia) MOF F.C.	
November 2016	MF	(Malaysia) Mohd Hazri Rozali	Free agent	
1 December 2016	MF	(Malaysia) R. Barath Kumar	(Malaysia) PJ Rangers	
1 December 2016	ST	(Malaysia) Mohd Syazwan Nordin	(Malaysia) Felcra F.C.	

=== Pahang ===
Head coach: (Malaysia) Dollah Salleh (1st season)

In:

Date	Pos.	Player	From
November 2016	DF	(Malaysia) Muslim Ahmad	(Malaysia) Kelantan FA
November 2016	MF	(Malaysia) Wan Zaharulnizam Zakaria	(Malaysia) Kelantan FA
November 2016	MF	(Malaysia) Ahmad Syamim Yahya	(Malaysia) Felda United F.C.
November 2016	MF	(Malaysia) D. Christie Jayaseelan	(Malaysia) Felda United F.C.
November 2016	MF	(Malaysia) Nurridzuan Abu Hassan	(Malaysia) Perak FA
November 2016	MF	(Malaysia) Joseph Kalang Tie	(Malaysia) Terengganu FA
November 2016	MF	(Malaysia) Ahmad Nordin Alias	(Malaysia) Terengganu FA
November 2016	DF	(Malaysia) Zubir Azmi	(Malaysia) Terengganu FA
November 2016	FW	(Malaysia) Ashari Samsudin	(Malaysia) Terengganu FA
November 2016	GK	(Malaysia) Wan Azraie Wan Teh	(Malaysia) T-Team F.C.
November 2016	DF	(Malaysia) Mohd Afif Amiruddin	(Malaysia) Perlis FA
November 2016	MID	(The Gambia) Mohamadou Sumareh	(Malaysia) Perlis FA
January 2017	DF	(Spain) (Malaysia) Kiko Insa	(Indonesia) Bali United F.C.
January 2017	MID/DEF	(South Korea) Heo Jae-won	(United Arab Emirates) Dibba Al-Fujairah Club
January 2017	ST	(Brazil) Matheus Alves	(Brazil) Fluminense FC
January 2017	ST	(United States) (Nigeria) Bright Dike	(Russia) Amkar Perm

Out:

Date	Pos.	Player	To
November 2016	MF	(Malaysia) Mohd Fauzi Roslan	(Malaysia) Melaka United
November 2016	FWD	(Malaysia) Amirul Kasmuri	(Malaysia) Shahzan Muda F.C.
November 2016	FWD	(Malaysia) Faizal Abdul Rani	(Malaysia) Shahzan Muda F.C.
November 2016	FWD	(Malaysia) Shafie Zahari	(Malaysia) Shahzan Muda F.C.
November 2016	MID	(Malaysia) Helmi Abdullah	(Malaysia) Shahzan Muda F.C.
November 2016	MID	(Malaysia) Shah Amirul Zamri	(Malaysia) Pahang U21
November 2016	GK	(Malaysia) Daniel Wafiuddin Sa'dun	(Malaysia) Pahang U21
November 2016	MID	(Malaysia) Rizua Shafiqi Kamaruzaman	(Malaysia) Shahzan Muda F.C.
November 2016	DF	(Malaysia) Ridhwan Maidin	(Malaysia) Shahzan Muda F.C.
November 2016	DF	(Malaysia) Mohd Shahrizan Salleh	(Malaysia) Shahzan Muda F.C.
November 2016	GK	(Malaysia) Mohd Nasril Nourdin	(Malaysia) Perlis FA
January 2017	RW	(Malaysia) D.Saarvindran	(Malaysia) JDT II
November 2016	DC	(Brazil) Jailton	Free agent
November 2016	MF	(Chile) Claudio Meneses	Free agent
November 2016	ST	(Argentina) Pablo Vranjicán	Free agent
November 2016	MF	(Afghanistan) Faysal Shayesteh	(Indonesia) Arema Cronus F.C.

=== Penang ===
Head coach: (Malaysia) Zainal Abidin Hassan(1st season)

In:

Date	Pos.	Player	From	Note
Nov 2016	ST	(Papua New Guinea) Nigel Dabinyaba	(New Zealand) Canterbury United FC	
Nov 2016	DR/DM	(Malaysia) K. Reuben	(Malaysia) Kuala Lumpur FA	
Nov 2016	DR/MR	(Malaysia) Yong Kuong Yong	(Malaysia) Terengganu FA	
Nov 2016	MC	(Malaysia) Shazalee Ramlee	(Malaysia) Kuantan FA	
Nov 2016	DL	(Malaysia) Muhd Zulkhairi Zulkeply	(Malaysia) UiTM F.C.	
Nov 2016	GK	(Malaysia) Amirul Asyraf Mohd Suhaidi	(Malaysia) UiTM F.C.	
Jan 2017	GK	(Malaysia) Syed Adney	(Malaysia) Negeri Sembilan FA	
Jan 2017	DMC	(Australia) Diogo Ferreira	(Indonesia) Persib Bandung	
Jan 2017	DRC	(Hong Kong) Andrew James Russell	(Hong Kong) South China AA	

Out:

Date	Pos.	Player	To	Note
1 December 2016	DF	(Malaysia) Mohd Fitri Omar	(Malaysia) Kedah	
1 December 2016	DF	(Malaysia) Mazlizam Mohamad	(Malaysia) Perlis	
1 December 2016	DF	(Malaysia) Mohd Farisham Ismail	(Malaysia) Kelantan	loan return
1 December 2016	DF	(Malaysia) Mat Saiful Mohamad	Retired	
1 December 2016	MF	(South Korea) Jeong Seok-min	Released	
1 December 2016	MF	(Malaysia) Mohd Redzuan Nawi	(Malaysia) MISC-MIFA	
1 December 2016	MF	(Malaysia) Mohd Zharif bin Hasna	Released	
1 December 2016	MF	(Malaysia) Ikhmal Ibrahim	(Malaysia) Sime Darby F.C.	
1 December 2016	MF	(Argentina) Matías Córdoba	(Indonesia) PS Barito Putera	
1 December 2016	MF	(Malaysia) Mohd Fauzan Dzulkifli	(Malaysia) PKNS FC	
1 December 2016	MF	(Malaysia) Muhd Nursalam Zainal Abidin	(Malaysia) UiTM FC	
1 December 2016	FW	(Nigeria) Ranti Martins	Released	
1 December 2016	GK	(Malaysia) Khairul Amri Salehuddin	(Malaysia) Perak	
1 December 2016	GK	(Malaysia) Mohd Firdaus Muhamad	(Malaysia) Melaka United	

=== Perak ===
Head coach: (Australia) Mehmet Durakovic

In:

Date	Pos.	Player	From
November 2016	GK	(Malaysia) Khairul Amri Salehuddin	(Malaysia) Pulau Pinang FA
December 2016	LW	(Malaysia) Nazrin Nawi	(Malaysia) Johor Darul Ta'zim F.C.
December 2016	MF	(Malaysia) Jasazrin Jamaluddin	(Malaysia) Johor Darul Ta'zim F.C.
December 2016	DF	(Malaysia) Idris Ahmad	(Malaysia) Felda United F.C.
December 2016	DF	(Malaysia) Ibrahim Aziz	(Malaysia) DRB-Hicom F.C.
December 2016	FWD	(Malaysia) Mohd Nizad Ayub	(Malaysia) MOF F.C.
December 2016	MF	(Malaysia) Wan Ahmad Syukri	(Malaysia) MISC-MIFA
December 2016	DF	(Malaysia) K. Shathiya	(Malaysia) DRB-Hicom F.C.
December 2016	ST	(Palestine) Yashir Pinto	(Malaysia) Melaka United
December 2016	ST	(Bulgaria) Vladislav Mirchev	(Bulgaria) OFC Nesebar
December 2016	MF	(Malaysia) Mohd Hafiz Kamal	(Malaysia) Selangor FA
December 2016	DF	(Malaysia) Shahrom Kalam	(Malaysia) Selangor FA
December 2016	ST	(Malaysia) Zaquan Adha	(Malaysia) JDT II
December 2016	ST	(Malaysia) Abdul Hadi Yahya	(Malaysia) Selangor FA
January 2017	MF	(Kosovo) Faton Toski	(Albania) KF Laçi

Out:

Date	Pos.	Player	To
November 2016	GK	(Malaysia) Mohd Zamir Selamat	(Malaysia) PKNS FC
November 2016	DF	(Malaysia) Hisyamudin Sha'ari	(Malaysia) Kuala Lumpur FA
November 2016	DF	(Malaysia) Tuah Iskandar Jamaluddin	(Malaysia) PJ Rangers
November 2016	MF	(Malaysia) Ahmad Sukri Abdul Hamid	(Malaysia) PKNP (Loan)
November 2016	MF	(Malaysia) Nurridzuan Abu Hassan	(Malaysia) Pahang FA
November 2016	MF	(Malaysia) Fazrul Hazli Kadri	(Malaysia) Felda Utd
November 2016	DF	(Malaysia) Mohd Syazwan Mohd Roslan	(Malaysia) Perlis FA
November 2016	DF	(Malaysia) Muhd Syahmil Khairi	Free agent
November 2016	DF	(Malaysia) Irfan Abdul Ghani	Free agent
November 2016	MF	(Malaysia) Mohd Fikri Sudin	(Malaysia) PKNP (Loan)
November 2016	MF	(Malaysia) Azrul Nizam Muhammad	(Malaysia) PKNP (Loan)
November 2016	MF	(Uzbekistan) Oybek Kilichev	(Uzbekistan) Navbahor Namangan
November 2016	FWD	(Albania) Xhevahir Sukaj	(Albania) FK Partizani Tirana
November 2016	FWD	(Brazil) Elias Fernandes de Oliveira	(Brazil) Associação Desportiva São Caetano
November 2016	FWD	(Malaysia) Razali Umar Kandasamy	Free agent

=== PKNS ===
Head coach: (Malaysia) E. Elavarasan (2nd season)

In:

Date	Pos.	Player	From
29 November 2016	MF	(Malaysia) Khyril Muhymeen Zambri	(Malaysia) PJ Rangers
1 December 2016	GK	(Malaysia) Zamir Selamat	(Malaysia) Perak
1 December 2016	DF	(Malaysia) Mohd Azmi Muslim	(Malaysia) Selangor
1 December 2016	FW	(Malaysia) Patrick Ronaldinho Wleh	(Malaysia) Selangor
1 December 2016	MF	(Malaysia) Mohd Affize Faisal Mamat	(Malaysia) Terengganu
1 December 2016	MF	(Malaysia) Mohd Arip Amiruddin	(Malaysia) DRB-Hicom F.C.
1 December 2016	FW	(Malaysia) Bobby Gonzales	(Malaysia) FELDA United
1 December 2016	DF	(Malaysia) Mohd Sabre Mat Abu	(Malaysia) Kedah
1 December 2016	MF	(Malaysia) K. Gurusamy	(Malaysia) Sarawak
1 December 2016	MF	(Malaysia) S. Sivanesan	(Malaysia) FELDA United
1 December 2016	DF	(Malaysia) Azmizi Azmi	(Malaysia) Perlis
12 December 2016	DF	(Malaysia) Amirizdwan Taj	(Malaysia) Free Agent
19 December 2016	FW	(Malaysia) Safee Sali	(Malaysia) Johor Darul Takzim
31 December 2016	FW	(Argentina) Lucas Espíndola	(Argentina) All Boys

Out:

Date	Pos.	Player	To
November 2016	MF	(Malaysia) Muhd Khairu Azrin Khazali	(Malaysia) Melaka United
November 2016	DF	(Malaysia) Mohd Farid Ramli	(Malaysia) Felda United F.C.
November 2016	GK	(Malaysia) Mohd Remezey Che Ros	(Malaysia) Kuala Lumpur FA
November 2016	DC	(Malaysia) Mohd Zaiza Zainal Abidin	(Malaysia) PBMS F.C.
November 2016	ST	(Malaysia) Yusaini Hafiz	(Malaysia) PBMS F.C.
November 2016	LW	(Malaysia) Fazli Baharuddin	(Malaysia) PBMS F.C.
November 2016	ST	(Argentina) Juan Manuel Cobelli	Free agent
November 2016	ST	(Argentina) Gabriel Miguel Guerra	(Argentina) Boca Juniors (Loan Return)
Dec 2016	ST	(Malaysia) Ahmad Shakir Mohd Ali	(Malaysia) PDRM FA (Loan)
Dec 2016	MF	(Malaysia) Shahurain Abu Samah	(Malaysia) PDRM FA (Loan)
Jan 2016	ST	(Malaysia) Farderin Kadir	(Malaysia) Negeri Sembilan FA (Loan)

=== Sarawak ===
Head coach: (Malaysia) David Usop (2nd season)

In:

Date	Pos.	Player	From
November 2016	GK	(Malaysia) Aidil Mohammad	(Malaysia) Mukah FA
November 2016	GK	(Malaysia) Zul Mohi	(Malaysia) Kuching FA
November 2016	DF	(Malaysia) Izray Iffarul Roslan	(Malaysia) Kuching FA
November 2016	FWD	(Malaysia) Mohd Hafiz Abu Bakar	(Malaysia) Kuching FA
November 2016	DF	(Malaysia) Mohd Najmudin Mat Noor	(Malaysia) Sarikei FA
November 2016	MID	(Malaysia) Nor Azizi Ramlee	(Malaysia) Promoted from youth team
November 2016	FWD	(Malaysia) Abdul Rahim Abdul Razak	(Malaysia) Promoted from youth team
November 2016	FWD	(Philippines) Mark Hartmann	(Singapore) Geylang International FC
November 2016	FWD	(South Korea) Lee Jong-ho	(Cambodia) Svay Rieng FC
15 January 2017	FWD	(Croatia) Mateo Roskam	(Malaysia) Sime Darby F.C.
15 January 2017	FWD	(Brazil) Demerson	(Brazil) Chapecoense

Out:

Date	Pos.	Player	To
November 2016	DF	(Malaysia) K. Thanaraj	Free agent
November 2016	DF	(Malaysia) Riduwan Ma'on	Free agent
November 2016	MID	(Malaysia) K. Gurusamy	(Malaysia) PKNS F.C.
November 2016	MID	(Malaysia) Akmal Noor	(Malaysia) MOF F.C.
November 2016	MID	(Papua New Guinea) Júnior Aparecido	Free agent
November 2016	FWD	(Malaysia) Syahrul Azwari Ibrahim	(Malaysia) JDT II
9/2/2017	FWD	(Australia) Ndumba Makeche	(Indonesia) Bali United F.C.
January 2017	FWD	(Brazil) Gilmar Jose da Silva Filho	(Brazil) Caxias do Sul
November 2016	FWD	(Malaysia) J. Partiban	(Malaysia) Terengganu FA
November 2016	GK	(Malaysia) Mohd Iqbal Suhaimi	Free agent
December 2016	DF	(Liberia) Teah Dennis Jr.	(Liberia) BYC FC

=== Selangor ===
Head coach: (Malaysia) P. Maniam (1st season)

In:

Date	Pos.	Player	From	Note
December 2016	ST	(Liberia) Francis Doe	(Malaysia) Felda United F.C.	
December 2016	ST	(Malaysia) Mohd Afiq Azmi	(Malaysia) Negeri Sembilan FA	
December 2016	MC	(Malaysia) Abdul Halim Zainal	(Malaysia) Sime Darby F.C.	
December 2016	AMC	(Malaysia) K. Satish	(Malaysia) PKNS F.C.	
January 2017	ST	(Malaysia) Nurshamil Abd Ghani	(Malaysia) Melaka United	
January 2017	DF	(Malaysia) Fairuz Abdul Aziz	(Malaysia) Shah Alam Antlers F.C.	
January 2017	Winger	(Romania) Victoraș Astafei	(Romania) FC Botoșani	
January 2017	AMC	(Brazil) (Timor-Leste) Juliano Mineiro	(Japan) Kashiwa Reysol	
May 2017	ST, AMC, Winger	(Malaysia) Mohd Amri Yahyah	(Malaysia) Melaka United	

Out:

Date	Pos.	Player	To
November 2016	MF	(Malaysia) Nazmi Faiz	(Malaysia) Johor Darul Ta'zim
November 2016	FW	(Malaysia) Ahmad Hazwan Bakri	(Malaysia) Johor Darul Ta'zim
December 2016	DF	(Malaysia) Mohd Azmi Muslim	(Malaysia) PKNS FC
December 2016	FW	(Liberia) Patrick Ronaldinho Wleh	(Malaysia) PKNS FC (Loan Return)
December 2016	MF	(Malaysia) Mohd Hafiz Kamal	(Malaysia) Perak FA
December 2016	DF	(Malaysia) Shahrom Kalam	(Malaysia) Perak FA
December 2016	ST	(Malaysia) Abdul Hadi Yahya	(Malaysia) Perak FA
December 2016	DF	(Malaysia) S. Subramaniam	(Malaysia) Kelantan FA
December 2016	GK	(Malaysia) Amirul Aiman Amran	(Malaysia) PJ Rangers
December 2016	ST	(Argentina) Mauro Olivi	(Argentina) Liniers

=== T–Team ===
Head coach: (Indonesia) Rahmad Darmawan (2nd season)

In:

Date	Pos.	Player	From	Note
23 November 2016	DF	(Malaysia) Shakir Zufayri Ibrahim	(Malaysia) Terengganu youth system	
23 November 2016	MF	(Malaysia) Muhamad Azrean Abd Aziz	(Malaysia) Terengganu youth system	
23 November 2016	GK	(Malaysia) Mohd Suhaimi Husin	(Malaysia) Terengganu	
1 December 2016	GK	(Malaysia) Hafidz Romly	(Malaysia) DRB-Hicom F.C.	
1 December 2016	FWD	(Uzbekistan) Farhod Tadjiyev	(Uzbekistan) Olmaliq FK	
21 December 2016	MF	(Malaysia) Mohd Fakhrurazi Musa	(Malaysia) Terengganu FA	
21 December 2016	FWD	(Malaysia) Muhammad Fauzi Abdul Kadar	(Malaysia) MISC-MIFA	

Out:

Date	Pos.	Player	To
November 2016	FW	(Malaysia) Izzaq Faris Ramlan	(Malaysia) Melaka United
November 2016	FW	(Malaysia) Safawi Rasid	(Malaysia) JDT
November 2016	GK	(Malaysia) Ilham Amirullah Razali	(Malaysia) Felda United
November 2016	FW	(Malaysia) Mohd Asrol Ibrahim	(Malaysia) Terengganu
November 2016	GK	(Malaysia) Wan Azraie Wan Teh	(Malaysia) Pahang FA
November 2016	MF	(Malaysia) Muhd Akhir Bahari	(Malaysia) PKNP F.C.
November 2016	MF	(Mali) Makan Konaté	
November 2016	ST	(Brazil) Patrick Cruz	

== Malaysia Premier League ==
The 2017 Malaysia Premier League (Malay: Liga Premier Malaysia 2017) is the 14th season of the Malaysia Premier League since its inception in 2004. 12 teams participated in the league with Melaka United as the reigning champions and currently play in the top flight of Malaysian football, Malaysia Super League. At the end of 2016 season, DRB-Hicom has pulled out from the league.

The season started on 20 January 2017.

=== ATM ===
Head Coach: (Malaysia) Azhar Abdullah

In:

Date	Pos.	Player	From	Note
Dec 2016	DC	(Uzbekistan) Ikbol Babakhanov	(Uzbekistan) FC Andijon	
Dec 2016	AMC	(South Korea) Bae Beom-Geun	Free agents	
Dec 2016	ST	(Uzbekistan) Pavel Smolyachenko	(Uzbekistan) FC Andijon	
Nov 2016	ST/AML	(Malaysia) Mohd Zairuldi Seini	(Malaysia) RAMD FC	
Nov 2016	ST/AML	(Malaysia) M. Navin Kumar	(Malaysia) Tentera Darat FC	

Out:

Date	Pos.	Player	To	Note
Nov 2016	DC	(Kazakhstan) Gies Irisbekov	Released	
Nov 2016	AMC	(Kazakhstan) Boris Fomekov	Released	
Nov 2016	ST	(Kazakhstan) Khasan Abdukarimov	Released	

=== Johor Darul Ta'zim II ===
Head Coach : (Malaysia) Mohd Hamzani Omar

In:

Date	Pos.	Player	From	Note
November 2016	GK	(Malaysia) Ernest Wong	(New Zealand) Eastern Suburbs FC	
November 2016	GK	(Malaysia) K. Sasikumar	(Malaysia) Johor Darul Ta'zim F.C.	
November 2016	AMRL	(Malaysia) Azinee Taib	(Malaysia) Johor Darul Ta'zim F.C.	
November 2016	AMRL	(Malaysia) Syahrul Azwari	(Malaysia) Sarawak FA	
November 2016	AML/ST	(Malaysia) Rozaimi Abdul Rahman	(Malaysia) Johor Darul Ta'zim F.C.	
November 2016	AML	(Malaysia) Aikal Aidil Azlan	(Malaysia) JDT III	
November 2016	AML	(Malaysia) Muhd Faiz Mohd Isa	(Malaysia) JDT III	
November 2016	DL	(Malaysia) Daniel Ting	(Malaysia) Negeri Sembilan FA	(Loan Return)
November 2016	MC	(Australia) Alex Smith	(Malaysia) Negeri Sembilan FA	
November 2016	AMC	(Argentina) Nicolás Alberto Fernández	(Greece) Asteras Tripolis	
December 2016	ST	(Argentina) Gabriel Miguel Guerra	(Argentina) Boca Juniors	
6 January 2017	DC	(Paraguay) Samuel Cáceres	(Argentina) Club Atlético Independiente	
January 2017	AMRLC	(Malaysia) D.Saarvindran	(Malaysia) Pahang FA	
12 February 2017	ST	(Argentina) Jerónimo Barrales	(Malaysia) Johor Darul Ta'zim F.C.	Swap

Out:

Date	Pos.	Player	To	Note
November 2016	MF	(Malaysia) Akmal Ishak	(Malaysia) Melaka United	
November 2016	MF	(Malaysia) Amirul Ikmal Hafiz	(Malaysia) Kuala Lumpur	
November 2016	GK	(Malaysia) Fazli Paat	(Malaysia) Melaka United	
November 2016	GK	(Malaysia) Al-Hafiz Hamzah	(Malaysia) PDRM FA	
November 2016	DC	(Singapore) Baihakki Khaizan	(Singapore) Warriors FC	
November 2016	MF	(Malaysia) Faizol Hussien	(Malaysia) PDRM FA	
November 2016	MF	(Malaysia) Nurul Azwan Roya	(Malaysia)	
November 2016	MF	(Malaysia) Mohd Yazid Zaini	(Malaysia) PBMS F.C.	
November 2016	MF	(Malaysia) Mohd Alif Yusof	(Malaysia) Felda United F.C.	
November 2016	MF	(Malaysia) Afiq Fazail	(Malaysia) Johor Darul Ta'zim F.C.	
November 2016	FW	(Malaysia) Darren Lok	(Malaysia) Johor Darul Ta'zim F.C.	
November 2016	FWD	(Singapore) Shahril Ishak	(Singapore) Warriors FC	
November 2016	FW	(Brazil) Paulo Rangel	(Brazil) Paysandu Sport Club	
November 2016	MF	(Malaysia) Akram Mahinan	(Malaysia) Kedah FA	
December 2016	ST	(Malaysia) Zaquan Adha	(Malaysia) Perak FA	
December 2016	DF	(Brazil) Bonfim	(Brazil) Atlético Clube Goianiense	
12 February 2017	ST	(Argentina) Gabriel Miguel Guerra	(Malaysia) Johor Darul Ta'zim F.C.	Promoted
24 February 2017	ST	(Malaysia) Hadi Fayyadh	(Malaysia) Johor Darul Ta'zim F.C.	Promoted

=== Kuala Lumpur ===
Head coach : (Brazil) Fábio Joaquim Maciel da Silva

In:

Date	Pos.	Player	From	Note
November 2016	DF	(Malaysia) Azmeer Yusof	(Malaysia) Kedah	
November 2016	DF	(Malaysia) Muhd Hazwan Abdul Rahman	(Malaysia) AirAsia F.C.	
November 2016	DF	(Uzbekistan) Bobur Akbarov	(Uzbekistan) FC Andijon	
November 2016	MF	(Malaysia) Ashri Chuchu	(Malaysia) Sarawak	
November 2016	DRC/DM	(Malaysia) Amirul Ikmal Hafiz	(Malaysia) JDT II	
November 2016	GK	(Malaysia) Ahmad Solehin Mamat	(Malaysia) Melaka United	
November 2016	GK	(Malaysia) Mohd Remezey Che Ros	(Malaysia) PKNS	
November 2016	GK	(Malaysia) Kamarul Effandi Abdul Rahim	(Malaysia) Sime Darby	
November 2016	DF	(Malaysia) Hisyamudin Sha'ari	(Malaysia) Perak	
November 2016	FWD	(Malaysia) Abdul Manaf Mamat	(Malaysia) Kelantan	
November 2016	FWD	(Argentina) Carlos Chamorro	Free agent	
November 2016	MF	(Argentina) Nicolas Dul	(Argentina) Chaco For Ever	
18/1/2017	ST	(Brazil) Guilherme de Paula	(Malaysia) PDRM FA	

Out:

Date	Pos.	Player	To	Note
November 2016	GK	(Malaysia) Mohd Soffuan Tawil	(Malaysia) UiTM F.C.	
December 2016	GK	(Malaysia) Badrulzaman Abdul Halim	(Malaysia) Melaka United	
November 2016	GK	(Malaysia) Norhadi Ubaidillah	(Malaysia) Melaka United	
November 2016	DF	(Malaysia) Nik Zul Aziz Nawawi	(Malaysia) Released	
November 2016	DF	(Malaysia) Fadhil Hashim	(Malaysia) Released	
November 2016	DF	(Malaysia) Ahmad Azlan Zainal	(Malaysia) Sabah FA	
November 2016	FWD	(Malaysia) Mohd Rasyid Aya	(Malaysia) Penang FA	
November 2016	DF	(Malaysia) Muhd Nazri Ahmad	(Malaysia) Melaka United	
November 2016	LW	(Malaysia) Isma Alif Mohd Salim	(Malaysia) Melaka United	
November 2016	CM	(Malaysia) Mohd Rosdi Zakaria	(Malaysia) Penjara F.C.	
November 2016	FWD	(Malaysia) A. Thamil Arasu	Free agent	
November 2016	MF	(Malaysia) Abdul Halim Zainal	(Malaysia) Selangor FA	
1 December 2016	MF	(Malaysia) Fahrul Razi Kamaruddin	(Malaysia) PJ Rangers	
1 December 2016	DF	(Brazil) Léo Carioca	Free agent	
1 December 2016	MF	(Palestine) Jonathan Cantillana	(Palestine) Ahli Al-Khaleel	
1 December 2016	ST	(Chile) Diego Inostroza	(Chile) Malleco Unido	
18/1/2017	FWD	(Argentina) Carlos Chamorro	Released	

=== Kuantan ===
In:

Date	Pos.	Player	From	Note
Dec 2016	ST	(Malaysia) Nabilah Khan Razali	(Malaysia) Temerloh F.C.	
Dec 2016	GK	(Malaysia) Fakhri Syahmi Badrul	(Malaysia) Pahang F.C.	
Dec 2016	GK	(Malaysia) Muhd Nur Kamarullah Khairul Saidi	(Malaysia) Pahang F.C.	
Dec 2016	DF	(Malaysia) Muhd Hariz Irffan Mohd Nazri	(Malaysia) Pahang F.C.	
Dec 2016	MF	(Malaysia) Muhd Baqiuddin Shamsudin	(Malaysia) Shahzan Muda F.C.	
Dec 2016	MF	(Malaysia) Mohd Zaidee Jamaluddin	(Malaysia) Kuantan FA	Promoted from (LBR Team)
Dec 2016	DC	(Malaysia) Amirullah Abdul Razak	(Malaysia) Free agents	
30 Dec 2016	AMLC	(Serbia) Stefan Vukmirović	(Serbia) FK Sloboda Užice	

Out:

Date	Pos.	Player	To	Note
Nov 2016	GK	(Malaysia) Mohd Zairi Hafiezi Idris	(Malaysia) Terengganu City F.C.	
Nov 2016	GK	(Malaysia) Rosfaizul Azuar Ali	Free agent	
Nov 2016	DC	(Malaysia) Muhd Ilham Yusof	(Malaysia) Felda United F.C.	
Nov 2016	DR	(Malaysia) Mohd Kamal Rodiarjat Ali	(Malaysia) PDRM FA	
Nov 2016	DL	(Malaysia) Mohd Hasmie Aziz	Free agent	
Nov 2016	MC	(Malaysia) Hazwan Fakhrullah	(Malaysia) PDRM FA	
Nov 2016	DMC	(Malaysia) Izer Hamkha Mohd Haizal	Free agent	
Nov 2016	ML	(Malaysia) Mohd Fiqri Mohd Abdullah	Free agent	
Nov 2016	MC	(Malaysia) Shazalee Ramlee	(Malaysia) Penang FA	
Nov 2016	ST	(Malaysia) Mohd Nasaruddin Che Ngah	Free agent	
Nov 2016	MC	(Croatia) Srdjan Vidakovic	Free agent	
Nov 2016	ST	(Ivory Coast) Dao Bakary	(Malaysia) PDRM FA	

=== MISC-MIFA ===
In:

Date	Pos.	Player	From	Note
Dec 2016	ST	(Nigeria) Michael Ijezie	Southern Myanmar United F.C.	
Dec 2016	ST	(Cameroon) Bodric Dimitri	(Sri Lanka) Colombo FC	
Dec 2016	GK	(Malaysia) Zulfadhli Mohamed	(Malaysia) PDRM FA	
Dec 2016	DR	(Malaysia) A. Puvanarajah	(Malaysia) DRB-Hicom F.C.	
Dec 2016	DR	(Malaysia) A. Varathan	(Malaysia) Megah Murni F.C.	
Dec 2016	DL	(Malaysia) S. Harivarman	(Malaysia) PJ Rangers	
Dec 2016	MC	(Malaysia) M. Yoganathan	(Malaysia) DRB-Hicom F.C.	
Dec 2016	DMC	(Malaysia) S. Cheevaanesvaran	(Malaysia) Kedah FA	
Dec 2016	AMC	(Malaysia) M. Kishan Raj	(Malaysia) PDRM FA	
Dec 2016	ST	(Malaysia) M. Terrence	(Malaysia) Megah Murni F.C.	
Dec 2016	ST	(Malaysia) Somkeat Preasart	(Malaysia) Kedah FA	
Dec 2016	DMC	(Malaysia) Mohd Redzuan Nawi	(Malaysia) Penang FA	
18/1/2017	DC	(Argentina) Alan Aciar	(Indonesia) Persija Jakarta	
18/1/2017	AMRC	(Indonesia) Steven Imbiri	(Indonesia) Persela Lamongan	

Out:

Date	Pos.	Player	To	Note
Dec 2016	GK	(Malaysia) Muhd Zahid Ahmad	(Malaysia)	
Dec 2016	DC	(Malaysia) Muhammad Munawar Shavukath Ali	(Malaysia) Terengganu City F.C.	
Dec 2016	DR	(Malaysia) S. Uvarajen	(Malaysia)	
Dec 2016	DC	(Malaysia) M. Sathish	(Malaysia)	
Dec 2016	DMC	(Malaysia) Muhd Sufie Noorazizan	(Malaysia)	
Dec 2016	AMLC	(Malaysia) Ash Hameed	(Malaysia)	
Dec 2016	MC	(Malaysia) Wan Mohd Syukri Wan Ahmad	(Malaysia) Perak TBG F.C.	
Dec 2016	RW	(Malaysia) S. Thiban Raj	(Malaysia)	
Dec 2016	LW	(Malaysia) Muhd Hazwanuddin Abdul Halem	(Malaysia) Penang FA Reserves	
Dec 2016	RW	(Malaysia) R. Puganeswaran	(Malaysia) SAMB F.C.	
Dec 2016	MC	(Malaysia) M. Suthan	(Malaysia) SAMB F.C.	
Dec 2016	ST	(Malaysia) S. Silambarasan	(Malaysia)	
Dec 2016	ST	(Malaysia) Mohd Fauzi Abdul Kadar	(Malaysia) T-Team F.C.	

=== Negeri Sembilan ===
In:

Date	Pos.	Player	From	Note
Nov 2016	FWD	(England) Lee Tuck	(Bangladesh) Abahani Limited Dhaka	
Nov 2016	FWD	(Croatia) Marko Šimić	(Vietnam) Long An F.C.	
Nov 2016	GK	(Malaysia) Mohd Yatim Abdullah	(Malaysia) Felcra F.C.	
Nov 2016	DF	(Malaysia) Arman Fareez Ali	(Malaysia) Perlis FA	
Nov 2016	GK	(Malaysia) Saiful Amar Sudar	(Malaysia) Perlis FA	
Nov 2016	MF	(Malaysia) Muhd Izuan Salahuddin	(Malaysia) DRB-Hicom F.C.	
Nov 2016	MF	(Malaysia) Mohd Faizal Abu Bakar	(Malaysia) Kelantan FA	
Nov 2016	DF	(Malaysia) Noor Hazrul Mustafa	(Malaysia) Kelantan FA	
Dec 2016	FWD	(Japan) Bruno Castanheira	(Japan) F.C. Gifu	
Jan 2017	DM	(Serbia) Nemanja Vidić	(Kazakhstan) FC Kyzylzhar	
Jan 2017	ST	(Malaysia) Farderin Kadir	(Malaysia) PKNS F.C.	(Loan)

Out:

Date	Pos.	Player	To	Note
November 2016	MC	(Australia) Alex Smith	(Malaysia) Johor Darul Ta'zim II F.C.	
November 2016	DL	(Malaysia) Daniel Ting	(Malaysia) Johor Darul Ta'zim II F.C.	
November 2016	FWD	(France) Goran Jerković	Released	
November 2016	GK	(Malaysia) Syed Adney Syed Hussein	(Malaysia) Penang FA	
November 2016	GK	(Malaysia) Afiff Aizad Azman	(Malaysia) UiTM F.C.	
November 2016	FWD	(Malaysia) N. Thanabalan	(Malaysia) Felcra F.C.	Loan
November 2016	MC	(Malaysia) Sabri Sahar	(Malaysia) Sabah FA	
November 2016	ST	(Malaysia) Mohd Afiq Azmi	(Malaysia) Selangor FA	
November 2016	DC	(Malaysia) Mohd Radzuan Abdullah	Released	

=== PDRM ===
In:

Date	Pos.	Player	From	Note
Nov 2016	MF	(Malaysia) Hazwan Fakhrullah	(Malaysia) Kuantan FA	
Nov 2016	MF	(Malaysia) Shamar Fadzil	(Malaysia) DRB-Hicom F.C.	
Nov 2016	ST	(Ivory Coast) Dao Bakary	(Malaysia) Kuantan FA	
Nov 2016	MC	(Ivory Coast) Frederic Pooda	(Malaysia) Sime Darby F.C.	
Nov 2016	GK	(Malaysia) Al-Hafiz Hamzah	(Malaysia) Johor Darul Ta'zim II F.C.	
Nov 2016	MC	(Malaysia) Mohd Faizol Hussien	(Malaysia) Johor Darul Ta'zim II F.C.	
Nov 2016	DR	(Malaysia) Mohd Kamal Rodiarjat Ali	(Malaysia) Kuantan FA	
Nov 2016	D/ML	(Malaysia) Julamri Muhammad	(Malaysia) Sabah FA	
Nov 2016	MR	(Malaysia) Nazri Kamal	(Malaysia) DRB-Hicom F.C.	
Nov 2016	DC	(Malaysia) Kamarul Afiq Kamaruddin	(Malaysia) Free agents	
Nov 2016	DR	(Malaysia) Nasril Izzat Jalil	(Malaysia) Terengganu FA	
Nov 2016	ST	(Malaysia) Ahmad Shakir Mohd Ali	(Malaysia) PKNS F.C.	(Loan)
Nov 2016	AMRC	(Malaysia) Shahurain Abu Samah	(Malaysia) PKNS F.C.	(Loan)

Out:

Date	Pos.	Player	To	Note
November 2016	DF	(Malaysia) Mohd Faizal Muhammad	(Malaysia) Melaka United	
November 2016	DF	(Malaysia) K. Reuben	(Malaysia) Penang FA	
November 2016	GK	(Malaysia) Haziq Nadzli	(Malaysia) JDT	
November 2016	FWD	(Malaysia) Fakrul Aiman Sidid	(Malaysia) Felda Utd	
November 2016	MF	(Malaysia) Abdul Latiff Suhaimi	(Malaysia) Terengganu FA	
November 2016	ST	(Malaysia) Haziq Fikri Hussein	(Malaysia) PJ Rangers	
November 2016	MF	(Brazil) Andrezinho		
November 2016	GK	(Malaysia) Zulfadhli Mohamed	(Malaysia) MISC-MIFA	
November 2016	GK	(Malaysia) Wilfred Jabun	(Malaysia)	
November 2016	DL	(Malaysia) Muhd Syauki Abdul Wahab	(Malaysia) DBKL	
November 2016	DC	(Malaysia) Mohd Razif Abdul Rahim	(Malaysia) DBKL	
November 2016	DRLC	(Malaysia) Qhairul Anwar Roslani	(Malaysia)	
November 2016	DM	(Malaysia) Mohd Hazsyafiq Hamzah	(Malaysia)	
November 2016	DL	(Malaysia) Mohd Fekry Tajudin	(Malaysia)	
18/1/2017	ST	(Brazil) Guilherme de Paula Lucrécio	(Malaysia) Kuala Lumpur FA	

=== Perlis ===
In:

Date	Pos.	Player	From	Note
Nov 2016	GK	(Malaysia) Mohd Jibrail Kamaron Bahrin	(Malaysia) DRB-Hicom F.C.	
Nov 2016	GK	(Malaysia) Mohd Nasril Nourdin	(Malaysia) Pahang FA	
1 Dec 2016	DF	(Malaysia) Mazlizam Mohamad	(Malaysia) Penang FA	
1 Dec 2016	DF	(Malaysia) K. Prabakaran	(Malaysia) Sime Darby F.C.	
Nov 2016	DF	(Malaysia) Mohd Syazwan Mohd Roslan	(Malaysia) Perak FA	
Nov 2016	DF	(Malaysia) Muszaki Abu Bakar	(Malaysia) Free agents	
29 Nov 2016	MF	(Malaysia) Mohd Hafiszuan Salehuddin	(Malaysia) PJ Rangers	
Nov 2016	MF	(Malaysia) Muhd Afiq Amsyar Salamat	(Malaysia) PKNP F.C.	
Nov 2016	MF	(Malaysia) Muhd Syafiq Johari	(Malaysia) Megah Murni F.C.	
Nov 2016	MF	(Malaysia) Che Mohd Safwan Hazman	(Malaysia) UKM F.C.	
Nov 2016	MF	(Malaysia) Syafiq Azri Ahmad Kamal	(Malaysia) MOF F.C.	
8 Jan 2017	DF	(Malaysia) Muhd Nasharizam Abdul Rashid	(Malaysia) Kelantan FA	Loan
8 Jan 2017	MF	(Malaysia) Mohd Syafiq Abdul Rahman	(Malaysia) Kelantan FA	Loan
8 Jan 2017	MF	(Malaysia) Amir Zikri Pauzi	(Malaysia) Kelantan FA	Loan
Jan 2017	MF	(South Korea) Oh Kyu-bin	(South Korea) Chungju Hummel FC	
Nov 2016	ST	(Malaysia) Mohd Saiful Basir	(Malaysia) Ipoh FA	
Nov 2016	ST	(Malaysia) Muhd Zafuan Azeman	(Malaysia) SSBJ	
Nov 2016	ST	(Malaysia) Shahrizal Saad	(Malaysia) Felcra F.C.	
Nov 2016	ST	(England) Brandon Adams	(England) Queens Park Rangers F.C.	Loan

Out:

Date	Pos.	Player	To	Note
Nov 2016	GK	(Malaysia) Azizon Abdul Kadir	Free agent	
Nov 2016	GK	(Malaysia) Nazar Shahar	Free agent	
Nov 2016	DR	(Malaysia) Muhd Elfie Elyaz Harizam	Free agent	
Nov 2016	ST	(Malaysia) Muhd Aqmal Alias	Free agent	
Nov 2016	GK	(Malaysia) Saiful Amar Sudar	Negeri Sembilan FA	
Nov 2016	DF	(Malaysia) Mohd Izuan Jarudin	Terengganu FA	
Nov 2016	DF	(Malaysia) Azmizi Azmi	(Selangor) PKNS F.C.	
Nov 2016	DF	(Malaysia) Arman Fareez Ali	Negeri Sembilan FA	
Nov 2016	DF	(Malaysia) Sumardi Hajalan	Sabah FA	
Nov 2016	DF	(Malaysia) Mohd Noorhisyam Mis	Free agent	
Nov 2016	DF	(Malaysia) Mohd Afif Amiruddin	Pahang FA	
Nov 2016	MF	(Malaysia) Nasrul Shazrin Roslan	(Malaysia) Felcra F.C.	
Nov 2016	MF	(Malaysia) Mohd Ezaidy Khadar	Terengganu FA	
Nov 2016	MF	(Malaysia) Sadam Hashim	(Selangor) UiTM F.C.	
Nov 2016	MF	(Malaysia) Mohd Firdaus Zulkafli	(Malaysia) Felcra F.C.	
Nov 2016	MF	(Malaysia) Mohd Syafiq Al-Hafiz Dawawi	(Selangor) UiTM F.C.	
Nov 2016	MF	(The Gambia) Mohamadou Sumareh	Pahang FA	
Dec 2016	FW	(Brazil) Charles Chad	(Brazil) Macaé	
Nov 2016	FW	(Malaysia) Fandi Ahmad	(Selangor) PJ Rangers	

=== Sabah ===
In:

Date	Pos.	Player	From
Dec 2016	ST	(France) Jonathan Béhé	(Singapore) Warriors FC
Dec 2016	AM	(France) Sofiane Choubani	(France) UJA Maccabi Paris Métropole
Dec 2016	MF	(Japan) Masaya Jitozono	Albirex Niigata Singapore FC
Jan 2017	DF	(Malaysia) Ahmad Azlan Zainal	(Malaysia) Kuala Lumpur FA
Nov 2016	DF	(Malaysia) Sumardi Hajalan	(Malaysia) Perlis FA
Nov 2016	MF	(Malaysia) Sabri Sahar	(Malaysia) Negeri Sembilan FA
Nov 2016	MF	(Malaysia) Saliun Mastar	Promoted from Youth Team

Out:

Date	Pos.	Player	To	Note
Nov 2016	GK	(Malaysia) Aldrian J. Agus	(Malaysia) KDMM F.C.	
Nov 2016	DF	(Malaysia) Julamri Muhammad	(Malaysia) PDRM FA	
Nov 2016	DF	(Malaysia) Mohd Badrul Afendy Mohd Fadzli	(Malaysia) PJ Rangers	
Nov 2016	MF	(Malaysia) Rexjeson Pitrus	(Malaysia) KDMM F.C.	
Nov 2016	MF	(Brazil) Everton Souza Santos		
Nov 2016	MF	(Malaysia) Shafuan Adli Shaari	(Malaysia) Terengganu City F.C.	
Nov 2016	MF	(Malaysia) Felexsius Amil	(Malaysia) KDMM F.C.	
Nov 2016	MF	(Malaysia) Muhd Azrie Basalie	(Malaysia)	
Nov 2016	ST	(Malaysia) Shafie Talib	(Malaysia) KDMM F.C.	
Nov 2016	ST	(Malaysia) Stuart Wark	(Malaysia) Felda United F.C.	
Nov 2016	ST	(Bosnia and Herzegovina) Muamer Salibašić		

=== PKNP ===
In:

Date	Pos.	Player	From	Note
Nov 2016	DF	(Malaysia) Muhd Syazwan Zaipol Bahari	(Malaysia) Perak U21	
Nov 2016	MF	(Malaysia) Ahmad Sukri Abdul Hamid	(Malaysia) Perak FA	Loan
Nov 2016	DF	(Malaysia) Azrul Nizam Muhammad	(Malaysia) Perak FA	Loan
Nov 2016	MF	(Malaysia) Muhd Faizzwan Dorahim	(Malaysia) Perak U21	
Nov 2016	FWD	(Malaysia) Mohd Nor Hamizaref Hamid	(Malaysia) Sungai Ara F.C.	
Nov 2016	MF	(Malaysia) Muhd Akhir Bahari	(Malaysia) T-Team F.C.	
Nov 2016	DF	(Malaysia) G. Ganesh	(Malaysia) Perak U21	
Nov 2016	MF	(Malaysia) Mohd Irwan Syazmin Wahab	(Malaysia) Kedah FA	
Nov 2016	GK	(Malaysia) Amin Faisal Mohd Saidi	(Malaysia) Terengganu FA	
Nov 2016	MC	(Malaysia) Muhamad Mohd Safa	(Malaysia) KDMM F.C.	
14 Jan 2017	ST	(Brazil) Gilberto Fortunato	(Kosovo) KF Drita	
14 Jan 2017	LW	(Netherlands) Vincent Weijl	(Denmark) FC Fredericia	
14 Jan 2017	DC	(Latvia) Ritus Krjauklis	(Latvia) FK RFS	

Out:

Date	Pos.	Player	To	Note
Nov 2016	GK	(Malaysia) Mohd Amirul Asraf Mohd Noor	(Malaysia) Released	
Nov 2016	GK	(Malaysia) Mohd Fareez Farhan Ismail	(Malaysia) Released	
Nov 2016	DC	(Malaysia) Shaik Awish Alkirani	(Malaysia) Released	
Nov 2016	DC	(Malaysia) Syed Mohd Ridzuan Syed Bakri	(Malaysia) Released	
Nov 2016	DL	(Malaysia) Muhd Hafiz Mohd Fauzi	(Malaysia) Released	
Nov 2016	AMRLC	(Malaysia) Muhd Hafizuddin Harun	(Malaysia) Released	
Nov 2016	AML	(Malaysia) Muhd Ibni Khozaini	(Malaysia) Released	
Nov 2016	ST	(Malaysia) Muhd Aliff Abu Shaari Al-Hiddri	(Malaysia) Released	
Nov 2016	ST	(Malaysia) Francis Martin	(Malaysia) Released	

=== Terengganu ===
In:

Date	Pos.	Player	From	Note
November 2016	MID	(Malaysia) Mohd Asrol Ibrahim	(Malaysia) T Team FC	
December 2016	FWD	(Malaysia) Mohd Ferris Danial	(Malaysia) FELDA United	
November 2016	GK	(Malaysia) Muhammad Syazwan Yusoff	(Malaysia) Kelantan FA	
November 2016	DL	(Malaysia) Adib Aizuddin Abdul Latif	(Malaysia) Felda United F.C.	
November 2016	DR	(Malaysia) Mohd Firdaus Faudzi	(Malaysia) Felda United F.C.	
November 2016	DC	(Malaysia) Mohd Izuan Jarudin	(Malaysia) Perlis FA	
November 2016	MC	(Malaysia) Abdul Shukur Jusoh	(Malaysia) Felda United F.C.	
November 2016	DMC	(Malaysia) Abdul Latiff Suhaimi	(Malaysia) PDRM FA	
November 2016	AMRL	(Malaysia) Mohd Faiz Nasir	(Malaysia) Felcra F.C.	
November 2016	AMR	(Malaysia) Mohd Ezaidy Khadar	(Malaysia) Perlis FA	
November 2016	DC	(Malaysia) Ezzrul Ikmanizar Abdul Rahman	(Malaysia) Kangar F.C.	
November 2016	DC	(Malaysia) Nasrullah Haniff Johan	(Malaysia) DRB-Hicom F.C.	
December 2016	RW	(Malaysia) J. Partiban	(Malaysia) Sarawak FA	
December 2016	LW	(Malaysia) Mohd Hazeman Abdul Karim	(Malaysia) Felcra F.C.	
1 January 2017	ST	(Argentina) Federico Falcone	(Malta) Valletta F.C.	
12 January 2017	DC	(Brazil) Lázaro Vinícius Alves Martins	(Bahrain) Manama Club	
12 January 2017	DMC	(Uzbekistan) Lutfulla Turaev	(Malaysia) Felda United F.C.	
20 February 2017	GK	(Malaysia) Mohd Suffian Abdul Rahman	Free agents	

Out:

Date	Pos.	Player	To	Note
Nov 2016	GK	(Malaysia) Shamirza Yusoff	(Malaysia)	
Nov 2016	GK	(Malaysia) Mohd Suhaimi Husin	(Malaysia) T-Team F.C.	
Nov 2016	DC	(Cameroon) Vincent Bikana	(Malaysia)	
Nov 2016	DR	(Malaysia) Yong Kuong Yong	(Malaysia) Penang FA	
Nov 2016	D/DMC	(Malaysia) Hasmizan Kamarodin	(Malaysia) Kelantan FA	
Nov 2016	DR	(Malaysia) Nasril Izzat Jalil	(Malaysia) PDRM FA	
Nov 2016	DL	(Malaysia) Zubir Azmi	(Malaysia) Pahang F.C.	
Nov 2016	AMLC	(Malaysia) Zairo Anuar	(Malaysia) Terengganu City F.C.	
Nov 2016	MC	(Malaysia) Ahmad Nordin Alias	(Malaysia) Pahang F.C.	
Nov 2016	AMLC	(Malaysia) Joseph Kalang Tie	(Malaysia) Pahang F.C.	
Nov 2016	DMC	(Malaysia) Affize Faisal	(Malaysia) PKNS F.C.	
Nov 2016	ST	(Montenegro) Bogdan Milić	Released	
Nov 2016	ST	(Malaysia) Hairuddin Omar	Retired	
Nov 2016	AML/ST	(Malaysia) Ashari Samsudin	(Malaysia) Pahang F.C.	
Dec 2016	ST	(Malaysia) Mohd Naim Asraff Nordin	(Malaysia) PJ Rangers	
Dec 2016	ST	(Malaysia) Mohd Hasrolsyawal Hamid	(Malaysia) Sime Darby F.C.	
Dec 2016	MC	(Malaysia) Mohd Fakhrurazi Musa	(Malaysia) T-Team F.C.	

=== UiTM ===
In:

Date	Pos.	Player	From	Note
Nov 2016	MF	(Ivory Coast) Dechi Marcel N'Guessan	(Ivory Coast) ES Bingerville	
Nov 2016	DF	(Nigeria) Onorionde Kughegbe		
Nov 2016	DF	(Malaysia) Faiz Mohd Bandong	(Malaysia) UKM F.C.	
Nov 2016	GK	(Malaysia) Mohd Soffuan Tawil	(Malaysia) Kuala Lumpur FA	
Nov 2016	DF	(Malaysia) Muhd Shazlan Abu Samah	(Malaysia) Sime Darby F.C.	
Nov 2016	GK	(Malaysia) Afiff Aizad Azman	(Malaysia) Negeri Sembilan FA	
Nov 2016	MF	(Malaysia) Sadam Hashim	(Malaysia) Perlis FA	
Nov 2016	ST	(Malaysia) Muhd Asnan Awal Hisham	(Malaysia) PKNS F.C.	
Nov 2016	MF	(Malaysia) Nursalam Zainal Abidin	(Malaysia) Penang FA	
Nov 2016	MF	(Malaysia) Mohd Syafiq Al-Hafiz Dawawi	(Malaysia) Perlis FA	
Dec 2016	ST	(Nigeria) Akanni-Sunday Wasiu	(Vietnam) Long An	
Dec 2016	AMRLC	(South Korea) Do Dong-hyun	(India) East Bengal F.C.	

Out:

Date	Pos.	Player	To	Note
June 2016	MF	(Malaysia) G. Rohan	(Malaysia) Emkay-NPNG	
Nov 2016	DF	(Malaysia) Adib Zainuddin	(Malaysia) Felcra F.C.	Loan
Nov 2016	GK	(Malaysia) Amirul Asyraf Suhaidi	(Malaysia) Penang FA	
Nov 2016	DF	(Malaysia) Zulkhairi Zulkeply	(Malaysia) Penang FA	
Nov 2016	GK	(Malaysia) Muhd Syafiq Ramli	(Malaysia) Hanelang F.C.	
Nov 2016	DF	(South Korea) Oh Joo-ho		
Nov 2016	DF	(Malaysia) Yosri Derma Raju	(Malaysia)	
Nov 2016	DF	(Malaysia) Muhd Fikri Ashaari	(Malaysia)	
Nov 2016	DF	(Central African Republic) Franklin Clovis Anzité		
Nov 2016	MF	(Malaysia) Kevin Gunter	(Malaysia)	
Nov 2016	MF	(Malaysia) Razif Hafizi Abdul Ghani	(Malaysia)	
Nov 2016	MF	(Cameroon) Moustapha Moctar Belbi		
Nov 2016	ST	(Guam) John Matkin		

=== DRB-Hicom ===
Out:

Date	Pos.	Player	To
	GK	(Malaysia) Hafidz Romly	(Malaysia) T-Team F.C.
	GK	(Malaysia) Mohd Hafiz Abu Bakar	(Malaysia) Sime Darby F.C.
	GK	(Malaysia) Mohd Jibrail Kamaron Bahrin	(Malaysia) Perlis FA
	GK	(Malaysia) Iszwan Aliff Ismail	(Malaysia)
	DL	(Malaysia) Ibrahim Aziz	(Malaysia) Perak FA
	DC	(Malaysia) Mohd Hamirul Hakim Mohd Akher	(Malaysia)
	DC	(Malaysia) Nasrullah Haniff Johan	(Malaysia) Terengganu FA
	DR	(Malaysia) A. Puvanarajah	(Malaysia) MISC-MIFA
	DC	(Malaysia) K. Shathiya	(Malaysia) Perak FA
	DC	(Malaysia) Abdullah Yusoff	(Malaysia) PJ Rangers
	DR	(Malaysia) Mohd Khairul Asyraf Ramli	(Malaysia) PKNP F.C.
	DL	(Malaysia) Mohd Faizal Mansor	(Malaysia) PJ Rangers
	DRL	(Malaysia) Muhd Safwan Hashim	(Malaysia) PBMS F.C.
	DC	(Spain) Godwin Antwi	(Malaysia) Melaka United
	RW	(Malaysia) Nazri Kamal	(Malaysia) PDRM FA
	RW	(Malaysia) Hairil Irwan Jamaludin	(Malaysia) MOF F.C.
	AM/ST	(South Korea) Kim Jin-Ryong	
	AML	(Malaysia) Muhd Izuan Salahuddin	(Malaysia) Negeri Sembilan FA
	MC	(Malaysia) Muhd Zikry Kamaruzaman	(Malaysia)
	DMC	(Malaysia) Ashadi Yusoff	(Malaysia) PBMS F.C.
	AML	(Malaysia) Muhd Azmi Hamzah	(Malaysia) MPKB-BRI U-BeS F.C.
	DMC	(Malaysia) M. Yoganathan	(Malaysia) MISC-MIFA
	MC	(Malaysia) Shamar Fadzil	(Malaysia) PDRM FA
	LW	(Malaysia) Mohd Hakimi Isa	(Malaysia) UiTM F.C.
	ST	(Croatia) Ivan Babić	
	RM/RB	(Malaysia) Mohd Arip Amiruddin	(Malaysia) PKNS F.C.
	ST	(Cameroon) Cedric Mbarga	(Cameroon) Coton Sport
	ST	(Malaysia) Muhd Daniel Azeem	(Malaysia)

== Malaysia FAM League ==
The 2017 Malaysia FAM League (referred to as the FAM League) is the 64th season of the FAM League since its establishment in 1952. The league is currently the third level football league in Malaysia. MISC-MIFA are the defending champions and currently play in the second level of Malaysian football, Malaysia Premier League.

=== DBKL ===
In:

Date	Pos.	Player	From	Note
Dec 2016	GK	(Malaysia) Badrulzaman Halim	(Malaysia) Kuala Lumpur FA	
Dec 2016	ST	(Malaysia) Muhd Amin Asraf Yaakob	(Malaysia) Felda Utd U21	
Dec 2016	DR	(Malaysia) Nik Ahmad Fadly Nik Leh	(Malaysia) Kuala Lumpur FA	
Dec 2016	DL	(Malaysia) Chairi Emmir Solehaddin	(Malaysia) Kuala Lumpur FA	
Dec 2016	GK	(Malaysia) Dzaiddin Zainuddin	(Malaysia) Kuala Lumpur FA	
Dec 2016	DC	(Malaysia) R. Gopinath	(Malaysia) Negeri Sembilan FA	
Dec 2016	DC	(Malaysia) Roslisham Md Noor	(Malaysia) Kuala Lumpur FA	
Dec 2016	DL	(Malaysia) Muhd Syauki Abdul Wahab	(Malaysia) PDRM FA	
Dec 2016	DM	(Malaysia) Muhd Fikri Elhan	(Malaysia) Kuala Lumpur FA	
Dec 2016	LCM	(Malaysia) Muhd Ikhram Ibrahim	(Malaysia) Kuala Lumpur FA	
Dec 2016	RW	(Malaysia) Mohd Syafiq Redzuan Mohd Pauzee	(Malaysia) PDRM FA	
Dec 2016	AM	(Malaysia) Muhd Afham Zulkipeli	(Malaysia) Kuala Lumpur FA	
Dec 2016	AM	(Malaysia) Ahmad Nazrin Ahmad Nazim	(Malaysia) Kuala Lumpur FA	
Dec 2016	LW	(Malaysia) Muhd Nurikhwan Mohd Ismail	(Malaysia) Kuala Lumpur FA	
Dec 2016	MC	(Malaysia) Muhd Hamzah Ahmad	(Malaysia) Negeri Sembilan FA	
Dec 2016	MC	(Malaysia) T. Steven Raj	(Malaysia) PDRM FA	
Dec 2016	ST	(Malaysia) Muhd Hadzirun Che Hamid	(Malaysia) UKM F.C.	
Dec 2016	ST	(Malaysia) Megat Muhd Faiz Tameem	(Malaysia) Cheras Premier F.C.	
Dec 2016	ST	(Malaysia) Muhd Razren Mohd Jesni	(Malaysia) Shahzan Muda F.C.	
Dec 2016	DC	(Malaysia) Mohd Azman Mohd Nor	(Malaysia) Selangor FA	

Out:

Date	Pos.	Player	To	Note

=== FELCRA ===
In:

Date	Pos.	Player	From	Note
November 2016	DF	(Malaysia) Fiqri Azwan Ghazali	(Malaysia) Melaka United	
November 2016	DF	(Malaysia) Syaiful Alias	(Malaysia) SSBJ	
November 2016	DF	(Malaysia) Ammar Akhmal Alias	(Malaysia) SSBJ	
November 2016	MF	(Malaysia) Mohd Muzaimir Abdul Hadi	(Malaysia) Kedah U21	
November 2016	MF	(Malaysia) Thanabalan Nadarajah	(Malaysia) Negeri Sembilan FA	
November 2016	GK	(Malaysia) S.Vishnu Ruban Nair	(Malaysia) MOF F.C.	
November 2016	MF	(Malaysia) Nashrul Shazrin Roslan	(Malaysia) Perlis FA	
November 2016	DF	(Malaysia) Muhd Syahrizal Shaharin	(Malaysia) PKNS F.C.	
November 2016	MF	(Malaysia) Mohd Firdaus Zulkaffli	(Malaysia) Perlis FA	
November 2016	MF	(Malaysia) Shazuan Ashraf Mathews	(Malaysia) Kedah FA	
November 2016	GK	(Malaysia) Muhd Syamim Othman	(Malaysia) Cheras Premier F.C.	
November 2016	ST	(Malaysia) Mohd Firdaus Azizul	(Malaysia) Sime Darby F.C.	
December 2016	ST	(Malaysia) Mohd Syazwan Nordin	(Malaysia) Melaka United	

Out:

Date	Pos.	Player	To	Note
Nov 2016	GK	(Malaysia) Affendi Amri Abdullah	(Malaysia)	
Nov 2016	GK	(Malaysia) Mohd Yatim Abdullah	(Malaysia) Negeri Sembilan FA	
Nov 2016	GK	(Malaysia) Muhd Zamir Zaini	(Malaysia)	
Nov 2016	DC	(Malaysia) Azizi Matt Rose	(Malaysia)	
Nov 2016	DF	(Malaysia) Muhd Farid Azmi	(Malaysia) PJ Rangers	
Nov 2016	DL	(Malaysia) Ahmad Azrul Azrie Ahmad Rushidi	(Malaysia)	
Nov 2016	DR	(Malaysia) Rahmat Hassan	(Malaysia)	
Nov 2016	MF	(Malaysia) Azi Shahril Azmi	(Malaysia) Terengganu FA	
Nov 2016	MF	(Malaysia) Shafiq Azman	(Malaysia) PBMS F.C.	
Nov 2016	MF	(Malaysia) Shahrulnizam Mustapa	(Malaysia)	
Nov 2016	MF	(Malaysia) Mohd Faiz Nasir	(Malaysia) Terengganu FA	
Nov 2016	MF	(Malaysia) Azrul Abdul Rahim	(Malaysia)	
Nov 2016	ST	(Malaysia) Mohd Faidzol Fazreen Shamsudin	(Malaysia) UKM F.C.	
Nov 2016	ST	(Malaysia) Shahrizal Saad	(Malaysia) Perlis FA	

=== Hanelang ===
In:

Date	Pos.	Player	From	Note
Dec 2016	GK	(Malaysia) Muhd Syafiq Ramli	(Malaysia) UiTM F.C.	
Dec 2016	GK	(Malaysia) Mohd Zaipubahari Shukri	(Malaysia) Kuala Nerus FA	
Dec 2016	DL	(Malaysia) Mohd Sukri Faiz Abdullah	(Malaysia) Terengganu U21	
Dec 2016	DM	(Malaysia) Mohd Midie Mohamad	(Malaysia) Setiu FA	
Dec 2016	AMR	(Malaysia) Mohd Syamri Ja'afar Sidek	(Malaysia) Hulu Terengganu FA	
Dec 2016	AML	(Malaysia) Muhd Nurudin Yusof	(Malaysia) Besut FA	
Dec 2016	ST	(Malaysia) Mohd Afiq Che Osman	(Malaysia) Hulu Terengganu FA	

Out:

Date	Pos.	Player	To	Note
Dec 2016	GK	(Malaysia) Muhd Muslim Yusof	(Malaysia) Terengganu City F.C.	
Dec 2016	DR	(Malaysia) Mohd Khairul Rosmadi	(Malaysia) Sime Darby F.C.	
Dec 2016	LW	(Malaysia) Nur Eqhwan Haffizy Zakaria	(Malaysia) Terengganu City F.C.	
Dec 2016	DC	(Malaysia) Al-Imran Mohd Aziz	(Malaysia) Penjara F.C.	
Dec 2016	DR	(Malaysia) Muhd Tarmizi Hakim Abdul Rahman	(Malaysia) Terengganu U21	
Dec 2016	RW	(Malaysia) Mohd Rahmat Makasuf	(Malaysia) Terengganu U21	
Dec 2016	LW	(Malaysia) Khairil Nizam Kamaruddin	(Malaysia) Terengganu U21	
Nov 2016	GK	(Malaysia) Muhd Saifuddin Mokhtar	(Malaysia)	
Nov 2016	DC	(Malaysia) Muhd Safix Ibrahim	(Malaysia)	
Nov 2016	DC	(Malaysia) Wan Faiz Awadullah	(Malaysia)	
Nov 2016	AM	(Malaysia) Mohd Shairul Afiq Yahya	(Malaysia)	
Nov 2016	DM	(Malaysia) Mohd Lukman Hakimi Mohd Saari	(Malaysia)	
Nov 2016	MC	(Malaysia) Muhd Hafizan Talib	(Malaysia)	
Nov 2016	AMRLC	(Malaysia) Mohd Syazreen Mohd Suhaimi	(Malaysia)	
Nov 2016	LW	(Malaysia) Alias Helmi Ibrahim	(Malaysia)	
Nov 2016	ST	(Malaysia) Muhd Izzuddin Rashid	(Malaysia)	

=== KDMM ===
In:

Date	Pos.	Player	From	Note
Dec 2016	GK	(Malaysia) Aldrian Agus	(Malaysia) Sabah FA	
Dec 2016	GK	(Malaysia) Presley Lim	(Malaysia) Sabah U21	
Dec 2016	GK	(Malaysia) Shairul Boidi	(Malaysia) DYS F.C.	
Dec 2016	DR	(Malaysia) Ahmad Sabri Ahmad Durayah	(Malaysia) Sabah U21	
Dec 2016	DC	(Malaysia) Mohd Zulfadlisham Roseland	(Malaysia) Sabah U21	
Dec 2016	DL	(Malaysia) Mohd Ikhmal Akid Bahari	(Malaysia) Sabah U21	
Dec 2016	DR	(Malaysia) Billy Doliente	(Malaysia) DYS F.C.	
Dec 2016	DC	(Malaysia) Rickson Pang Tabias	(Malaysia) Sabah U21	
Dec 2016	MC	(Malaysia) Aldrine Agus	(Malaysia)	
Dec 2016	LW	(Malaysia) Fneckly Baris	(Malaysia) DYS F.C.	
Dec 2016	MC	(Malaysia) Mohd Arfiyansah Abdul Jafar	(Malaysia) DYS F.C.	
Dec 2016	AMC	(Malaysia) Felexsius Amil	(Malaysia) Sabah FA	
Dec 2016	RW	(Malaysia) Rexjeson Pitirus	(Malaysia) Sabah FA	
Dec 2016	ST	(Malaysia) Saiful Sani	(Malaysia)	
Dec 2016	ST	(Malaysia) Klinsmon Aribulan	(Malaysia) Sabah U21	
Dec 2016	ST	(Malaysia) Shafie Talip	(Malaysia) Sabah FA	

Out:

Date	Pos.	Player	To	Note
Dec 2016	GK	(Malaysia) Endre S. Tipay	(Malaysia)	
Dec 2016	GK	(Malaysia) Usman Baalon	(Malaysia)	
Dec 2016	DC	(Malaysia) Redzuan Mohd Radzy	(Malaysia)	
Dec 2016	DC	(Malaysia) Rosdin Wasli	(Malaysia)	
Dec 2016	DL	(Malaysia) Jenius James	(Malaysia)	
Dec 2016	DC	(Malaysia) Khairol Ampalang	(Malaysia)	
Dec 2016	DR	(Malaysia) Faizal Yunus	(Malaysia)	
Dec 2016	DC	(Malaysia) Benerly Raim	(Malaysia) Keningau FA	
Dec 2016	AMRL	(Malaysia) Hairy Safwan Esnadi	(Malaysia)	
Dec 2016	DMC	(Malaysia) Zuraindey Jumai	(Malaysia)	
Dec 2016	RW	(Malaysia) Hitler Stephanius Salaw	(Malaysia)	
Dec 2016	LW	(Malaysia) Anwari Mohd Tajuddin	(Malaysia)	
Dec 2016	MC	(Malaysia) Muhamad Mohd Safa	(Malaysia) PKNP F.C.	
Dec 2016	LW	(Malaysia) Dan Joseph Malintau	(Malaysia)	
Dec 2016	MC	(Malaysia) Jackson Taguah	(Malaysia)	
Dec 2016	MC	(Malaysia) Helmezey Jonis	(Malaysia)	
Dec 2016	MC	(Malaysia) Mohd Ashrafi Abdan	(Malaysia)	
Dec 2016	ST	(Malaysia) Ian James Wong	(Malaysia)	
Dec 2016	ST	(Malaysia) Ramadin Anduhut	(Malaysia)	
Dec 2016	ST	(Malaysia) Jeerians Judin	(Malaysia) Limbang FA	

=== Kuching ===
In:

Date	Pos.	Player	From	Note
Dec 2016	DC	(Malaysia) Razziman Razali	(Malaysia) Samarahan	
Dec 2016	DM	(Malaysia) Zambery Zainal	(Malaysia) Samarahan	
Dec 2016	LW	(Malaysia) Iqmal Mustaqim Kamrodin	(Malaysia) Sarawak	
Dec 2016	CM	(Malaysia) Nasyirat Mustaqim Sepawi	(Malaysia) Sarawak	
Dec 2016	ST	(Malaysia) Mohd Asrullah Drahman	(Malaysia) Samarahan	
Dec 2016	ST	(Malaysia) Nazarudin Bohri	(Malaysia) Melaka United	

Out:

Date	Pos.	Player	To	Note
Dec 2016	GK	(Malaysia) Zul Mohi	(Malaysia) Sarawak	
Dec 2016	DLC	(Malaysia) Izray Iffarul Roslan	(Malaysia) Sarawak	
Dec 2016	RW	(Malaysia) Mohd Hafiz Abu Bakar	(Malaysia) Sarawak	
Dec 2016	LW	(Malaysia) Epienizam Effendi	(Malaysia) Penjara F.C.	
Nov 2016	GK	(Malaysia) Mohd Fiqri Roslee	Released	
Nov 2016	GK	(Malaysia) Mohd Nizam Ali	Released	
Nov 2016	GK	(Malaysia) Alvin McQuel Chundang	Released	
Nov 2016	DR	(Malaysia) Abang Mohd Hilmi Abang Othman	Released	
Nov 2016	DC	(Malaysia) Mohd Noorhafizul Julai	Released	
Nov 2016	DL	(Malaysia) Mohd Zahin Farhan	Released	
Nov 2016	DC	(Malaysia) Said Mohd Adidie Ahmad Syed Mustapha	Released	
Nov 2016	RW	(Malaysia) Fiqkri Zulfikha Bohari	Released	
Nov 2016	MC	(Malaysia) Omar Shahid Rahim	Released	
Nov 2016	ST	(Malaysia) Ahmad Faiz Bujang	Released	

=== MPKB-BRI U-BeS ===
In:

Date	Pos.	Player	From	Note
Dec 2016	GK	(Malaysia) Muhd Syazwan Mahmad Azahary	(Malaysia) MOF F.C.	
Dec 2016	DC	(Malaysia) Muhd Zufril Haidy Mazlan	(Malaysia) Negeri Sembilan FA	
Dec 2016	DRC	(Malaysia) Mohd Zafran Akramin	(Malaysia) Kelantan FA	
Dec 2016	DC	(Malaysia) Muhd Hazim Mohd Azmi	(Malaysia) Kuala Lumpur FA	
Dec 2016	D/DM	(Malaysia) Tuan Mohd Norhisan Tuan Mahmood	(Malaysia) Penjara F.C.	
Dec 2016	RW	(Malaysia) Mohd Syamry Mohamad	(Malaysia) Kelantan FA	
Dec 2016	MC	(Malaysia) Mohd Khairudin Ramli	(Malaysia) Penjara F.C.	
Dec 2016	LW	(Malaysia) Muhd Azmi Hamzah	(Malaysia) DRB-Hicom F.C.	
Dec 2016	MC	(Malaysia) Mohd Fikram Mohamad	(Malaysia) Kelantan FA	
Dec 2016	MC	(Malaysia) Mohd Shukri Mohd Zawawi	(Malaysia) Tanah Merah FA	
Dec 2016	RW	(Malaysia) Mohd Baharen Hisyam Zainuddin	(Malaysia) Tanah Merah FA	
Dec 2016	RW	(Malaysia) Nik Azrul Hisham Nik Ahmad	(Malaysia) Tanah Merah FA	
Dec 2016	ST	(Malaysia) Mohd Saiful Bahari Abdullah	(Malaysia) Pasir Mas FA	

Out:

Date	Pos.	Player	To	Note
Dec 2016	GK	(Malaysia) Wan Mohd Faqih Mustafah	(Malaysia)	
Dec 2016	GK	(Malaysia) Muhd Shahruddin Ismail	(Malaysia)	
Dec 2016	DR	(Malaysia) Mohd Rafli Rahim	(Malaysia)	
Dec 2016	DL	(Malaysia) Mohd Hasif Mohd Saripudin	(Malaysia)	
Dec 2016	DC	(Malaysia) S. Somchai	(Malaysia)	
Dec 2016	DL	(Malaysia) Mohd Amri Fazal Mat Nor	(Malaysia)	
Dec 2016	DC	(Malaysia) Muhd Akmal Azlan	(Malaysia)	
Dec 2016	DC	(Malaysia) Muhd Muzammel Madiran	(Malaysia)	
Dec 2016	DC	(Malaysia) Muhd Ikhwan Shamsuddin	(Malaysia)	
Dec 2016	DR	(Malaysia) Mohd Sani Nawi	(Malaysia)	
Dec 2016	DL	(Malaysia) Mohd Hafizi Awang	(Malaysia)	
Dec 2016	MC	(Malaysia) Mohd Hazwani Abdul Karim	(Malaysia)	
Dec 2016	DMC	(Malaysia) Khairan Ezuan Razali	(Malaysia)	
Dec 2016	LW	(Malaysia) Mohd Syazwan Fikry Mohd Husairi	(Malaysia) T-Team U21	
Dec 2016	AMC	(Malaysia) Mohd Fahmi Izzuddin Mohd Lokeman	(Malaysia)	
Dec 2016	LW	(Malaysia) Mohd Aminudin Mohd Yusoff	(Malaysia)	
Dec 2016	MC	(Malaysia) Mohd Asmie Amir Zahari	(Malaysia)	
Dec 2016	RW	(Malaysia) Muhd Akid Ramli	(Malaysia)	
Dec 2016	RW	(Malaysia) Muhammad Norhamizi Haron	(Malaysia)	
Dec 2016	DMC	(Malaysia) Aliff Raziman Rahisam	(Malaysia)	
Dec 2016	AMC	(Malaysia) Mohd Khairul Rizam Che Soh	(Malaysia) T-Team U21	
Dec 2016	DMC	(Malaysia) Mohd Hafiz Mahadi	(Malaysia)	
Dec 2016	ST	(Malaysia) Rahmat Che Hashim	(Malaysia)	
Dec 2016	ST	(Malaysia) Tuan Mohd Shahrizal Tuan Soh	(Malaysia)	
Dec 2016	ST	(Malaysia) Muhd Lokman Mat Salleh	(Malaysia)	
Dec 2016	ST	(Malaysia) Mohd Faizal Abdullah	(Malaysia)	
Dec 2016	ST	(Malaysia) Mohd Akram Hassan	(Malaysia) PDRM U21	

=== MOF ===
In:

Date	Pos.	Player	From	Note
Dec 2016	GK	(Malaysia) Mohd Firdaus Yusof	(Malaysia) Megah Murni F.C.	
Dec 2016	GK	(Malaysia) Wan Ahmad Hababa	(Malaysia) PDRM FA	
Dec 2016	DR	(Malaysia) S. Pavithran	(Malaysia) N. Nine F.C.	
Dec 2016	DC	(Malaysia) Johar Adli Joharudin	(Malaysia) Felda United F.C.	
Dec 2016	DC	(Malaysia) Mohd Shamirul Rani	(Malaysia) PBMM F.C.	
Dec 2016	LW	(Malaysia) Aikal Aiman Azlan	(Malaysia) PBMM F.C.	
Dec 2016	AM	(Malaysia) Muhd Nor Saiful Abdul Rahman	(Malaysia)	
Dec 2016	AMC	(Malaysia) Mohd Akmal Mohd Noor	(Malaysia) Sarawak FA	
Dec 2016	LW	(Malaysia) Marcus Mah Yung Jian	(Malaysia) Help University	
Dec 2016	DMC	(Malaysia) K. Divinesh	(Malaysia) Ipoh FA	
Dec 2016	ST	(Malaysia) Mohd Hakim Zainal	(Malaysia) PBMM F.C.	
Dec 2016	MC	(Malaysia) Reeshafiq Alwi	(Malaysia) Melaka United	
Dec 2016	RW	(Malaysia) Hairil Irwan Jamaluddin	(Malaysia) DRB-Hicom F.C.	

Out:

Date	Pos.	Player	To	Note
Nov 2016	DF	(Malaysia) Tuan Muhamad Faim	(Malaysia) Kelantan FA	Loan Return
Nov 2016	DC	(Malaysia) Faizol Nazlin Sayuti	(Malaysia) Kelantan FA	Loan Return
Nov 2016	MC	(Malaysia) Mohd Rozaimi Azwar	(Malaysia) Kelantan FA	Loan Return
Dec 2016	GK	(Malaysia) S. Vishnu Ruban Nair	(Malaysia) Felcra F.C.	
Dec 2016	GK	(Malaysia) Muhd Syazwan Mahmad Azahary	(Malaysia) MPKB-BRI U-BeS F.C.	
Dec 2016	D/ML	(Malaysia) Syafiq Azri Ahmad Kamal	(Malaysia) Perlis FA	
Dec 2016	RW	(Malaysia) Mohd Aris Zaidi	(Malaysia) Penjara F.C.	
Dec 2016	LW	(Malaysia) Mohd Helmi Hariri Ibrahim	(Malaysia) UKM F.C.	
Dec 2016	RW	(Malaysia) Solehin Kanasian Abdullah	(Malaysia) PBMS F.C.	
Dec 2016	ST	(Malaysia) Mohd Nizad Ayub	(Malaysia) Perak TBG F.C.	
Dec 2016	DM	(Malaysia) Ezzat Mohamed Zin	(Malaysia) Kedah U21	
Dec 2016	DRC	(Malaysia) Mohd Zulharis Mohd Noor	(Malaysia)	
Dec 2016	DR	(Malaysia) Mohd Aminuddin Mohd Noor	(Malaysia)	
Dec 2016	MC	(Malaysia) Rezal Zambery Yahya	(Malaysia)	
Dec 2016	AMC	(Malaysia) Mohd Ailim Fahmi Kamaruddin	(Malaysia)	
Dec 2016	ST	(Malaysia) Wan Mohd Alif Wan Jasmi	(Malaysia)	

=== SAMB ===
In:

Pos.	Player	From
GK	(Malaysia) Muhammad Fahmie Hanafiah	(Malaysia) Melaka United
GK	(Malaysia) Raja Ahmad Syukrie Raja Ahmad	
DF	(Malaysia) Ahmad Shahir Ismail	(Malaysia) Melaka United
DF	(Malaysia) Mohd Firdaus Abu	
DF	(Malaysia) Mohd Shahezad Ramli	
DF	(Malaysia) Saffrullah Iqhwan Khan Ismail Khan	
MF	(Malaysia) Muhammad Rashidan Abdul Malek	
MF	(Malaysia) Muhammad Haziq Rezal	(Malaysia) JDT III
MF	(Malaysia) Muhammad Asyraf Abdul Talib	(Malaysia) Shahzan Muda F.C.
MF	(Malaysia) Muhamad Hanafi Umar	(Malaysia) Hulu Terengganu FA
MF	(Malaysia) Norfaizatul Iqbal Ayub	(Malaysia) Melaka United
MF	(Malaysia) Suthan Moorthy	(Malaysia) MISC-MIFA
MF	(Malaysia) Muhammad Azlan Nazri	
FW	(Malaysia) Puganeswaran Ravendra	(Malaysia) MISC-MIFA
FW	(Malaysia) Mohammad Nizam Abdul Rahman	(Malaysia) PBMM F.C.

Out:

Pos.	Player	To
GK	(Malaysia) Mohd Asrul Zainudin	
GK	(Malaysia) Azri Azmi	
DF	(Malaysia) Amirul Akmal Azman	
DF	(Malaysia) Mohd Ezwan Rameli	
DF	(Malaysia) Ahmad Kamil Abdul Ghani	
DF	(Malaysia) Amiroul Syammim Mohd Yusof	(Malaysia) Melaka United
MF	(Malaysia) Mohd Zulfadli Nasir	
MF	(Malaysia) Mohd Asysham Asri	(Malaysia) Terengganu City F.C.
MF	(Malaysia) Mohd Azizan Baba	
MF	(Malaysia) Muhd Hanafiah Abu Bakar	
MF	(Malaysia) Muhd Dzulfahmie Abdul Rahman	
MF	(Malaysia) Mohd Azuwad Mohd Arip	
FW	(Malaysia) Mohd Zaidi Zubir	
FW	(Malaysia) Azizi Firdaus Mustapa	
FW	(Malaysia) Mohd Syazwan Nordin	(Malaysia) Felcra F.C.

=== PBMS ===
In:

Date	Pos.	Player	From	Note
Dec 2016	GK	(Malaysia) Mohd Redzuan Harun	(Malaysia) Sime Darby F.C.	
Dec 2016	GK	(Malaysia) Muhd Nuraizat Abdul Aziz	(Malaysia) Hulu Langat F.C.	
Dec 2016	DC	(Malaysia) Mohd Zaiza Zainal Abidin	(Malaysia) PKNS F.C.	
Dec 2016	DC	(Malaysia) Mohd Hasmarul Fadzir Hassan	(Malaysia) AirAsia F.C.	
Dec 2016	DL	(Malaysia) Muhd Fakhri Mohd Zain	(Malaysia) Melaka United	
Dec 2016	DRL	(Malaysia) Muhd Safwan Hashim	(Malaysia) DRB-Hicom F.C.	
Dec 2016	DC	(Malaysia) Mohd Hakim Zainol	(Malaysia) Free agents	
Dec 2016	MC	(Malaysia) Ashadi Mohd Yusoff	(Malaysia) DRB-Hicom F.C.	
Dec 2016	RW	(Malaysia) Shafiq Azman	(Malaysia) Felcra F.C.	
Dec 2016	DMC	(Malaysia) Nur Areff Kamaruddin	(Malaysia) Sime Darby F.C.	
Dec 2016	RW	(Malaysia) R. Thivagar	(Malaysia) PKNS F.C.	Loan
Dec 2016	AMLC	(Malaysia) Adam Shafiq Fua'ad	(Malaysia) PKNS F.C.	Loan
Dec 2016	LW	(Malaysia) Mohd Fazli Baharuddin	(Malaysia) PKNS F.C.	
Dec 2016	RM	(Malaysia) Solehin Kanasian Abdullah	(Malaysia) MOF F.C.	
Dec 2016	AMC	(Malaysia) P. Pavithran	(Malaysia) Kuala Lumpur FA	
Dec 2016	LW	(Malaysia) Muhd Azwan Jatin	(Malaysia) Ipoh FA	
Dec 2016	AMC	(Malaysia) Zailan Mohamad	(Malaysia)	
Dec 2016	MC	(Malaysia) Mohd Yazid Zaini	(Malaysia) JDT II	
Dec 2016	ST/AM	(Malaysia) Yusaini Hafiz Che Saad	(Malaysia) PKNS F.C.	
Dec 2016	ST	(Malaysia) Muhd Ammmar Abdul Aziz	(Malaysia) Ipoh FA	
Dec 2016	ST/LW	(Malaysia) Syamim Alif Sobri	(Malaysia) Sungai Ara F.C.	
Dec 2016	ST	(Malaysia) Muhd Ridzuan Kamis	(Malaysia) UKM F.C.	

Out:

Date	Pos.	Player	To	Note
N0v 2016	GK	(Malaysia) Mohd Fitry Kamal Ariffin	(Malaysia) Airasia F.C.	
Nov 2016	GK	(Malaysia) Muhd Haikal Haziq Razali	(Malaysia) Penang U19	
DRLC	Nov 2016	(Malaysia) Mohd Shamirul Rani	(Malaysia) MOF F.C.	
Dec 2016	DR	(Malaysia) Azuan Izam	(Malaysia) Shahzan Muda F.C.	
Nov 2015	DC	(Malaysia) Muhd Taufiq Talib	(Malaysia)	
Nov 2016	DR	(Malaysia) Mohd Azhar Mohd Soom	(Malaysia)	
Nov 2016	DL	(Malaysia) Eizlan Kamal Fasa	(Malaysia)	
Dec 2016	DC	(Malaysia) Nasrul Ramzan Abdul Rahaman	(Malaysia)	
Dec 2016	DC	(Malaysia) Faris Syazwan Mohamad	(Malaysia) PKNS U21	
Nov 2016	AMC	(Malaysia) Muhd Zainul Ariffin Idham Azam	(Malaysia)	
Nov 2016	AMC	(Malaysia) Mohd Zul Fakhri Zamri	(Malaysia)	
Dec 2016	LW	(Malaysia) Aikal Aiman Azlan	(Malaysia) MOF F.C.	
Nov 2016	RLW	(Malaysia) Sugianto Samsul	(Malaysia)	
Nov 2016	MC	(Malaysia) Muhd Arif Mohd Nor	(Malaysia)	
Nov 2016	DM	(Malaysia) Azib Shafie Mohd Sulaiman	(Malaysia)	
Nov 2016	LW	(Malaysia) Mohd Nasrullah Norzaidi	(Malaysia)	
Nov 2016	MC	(Malaysia) Mohd Helmi Mohd Rafi	(Malaysia)	
Nov 2016	MC	(Malaysia) Mohd Hafiz Jaafar	(Malaysia)	
Nov 2016	RW	(Malaysia) Amirrul Adli M. Yussli	(Malaysia)	
Dec 2016	ST	(Malaysia) Mohd Hakim Zainal	(Malaysia) MOF F.C.	
Dec 2016	ST	(Malaysia) Muhamat Shahdal Sakia	(Malaysia)	
Dec 2016	ST	(Malaysia) Azib Safuan Mohd Sulaiman	(Malaysia)	

=== Penjara ===
In:

Date	Pos.	Player	From	Note
November 2016	DL	(Malaysia) Mohd Hafizzal Mohd Yusof	(Malaysia) Free agents	
November 2016	DC	(Malaysia) Al-Imran Mohd Aziz	(Malaysia) Hanelang F.C.	
November 2016	MC	(Malaysia) Mohd Rosdi Zakaria	(Malaysia) Kuala Lumpur FA	
November 2016	AMRLC	(Malaysia) Muhd Asyidi Dilashar Yusof	(Malaysia) UKM F.C.	
November 2016	LW	(Malaysia) Epienizam Effendi	(Malaysia) Kuching FA	
November 2016	RW	(Malaysia) Mohd Aris Zaidi	(Malaysia) MOF F.C.	

Out:

Date	Pos.	Player	To	Note
November 2016	DM	(Malaysia) Mohd Khairudin Ramli	(Malaysia) MPKB-BRI U-BeS F.C.	
November 2016	DC/DM	(Malaysia) Tuan Mohd Norhisan Tuan Mahmood	(Malaysia) MPKB-BRI U-BeS F.C.	
November 2016	RW	(Malaysia) Mohd Faizol Fazree Ismail	(Malaysia) UKM F.C.	
November 2016	ST	(Malaysia) Wan Mohd Faiz Wan Sulaiman	(Malaysia) UKM F.C.	
November 2016	GK	(Malaysia) Wan Azizul Hakim Wan Sulaiman	(Malaysia)	
November 2016	GK	(Malaysia) Syahrul Faiz Shariman	(Malaysia)	
November 2016	GK	(Malaysia) Mohd Hakman Abdul Hadi	(Malaysia)	
November 2016	DL	(Malaysia) Fandi Linik	(Malaysia)	
November 2016	DL	(Malaysia) Muhd Adli Muhammad	(Malaysia)	
November 2016	DC	(Malaysia) Mohd Qushairy Naruddin	(Malaysia)	
November 2016	DC	(Malaysia) Rendie Acho	(Malaysia)	
November 2016	AM	(Malaysia) Mohd Syawal Rudin Abdul Rahim	(Malaysia)	
November 2016	DM	(Malaysia) Ronald Dennis	(Malaysia)	
November 2016	ST	(Malaysia) Mohd Ridzwan Abdul Halim	(Malaysia)	
November 2016	ST	(Malaysia) Yogeswaran a/l Seenivasam	(Malaysia)	

|}

=== PJ Rangers ===
In:

Date	Pos.	Player	From	Note
November 2016	MF	(Malaysia) See Kok Luen	(Malaysia) Melaka United	
November 2016	DF	(Malaysia) Tuah Iskandar Jamaluddin	(Malaysia) Perak FA	
1 December 2016	FW	(Malaysia) Mohd Naim Asraff Nordin	(Malaysia) Terengganu FA	
1 December 2016	MF	(Malaysia) Fahrul Razi Kamaruddin	(Malaysia) Kuala Lumpur FA	
1 December 2016	DF	(Malaysia) Lee Yong Cheng	(Malaysia) Kuala Lumpur FA	
1 December 2016	MF	(Malaysia) R. Barath Kumar	(Malaysia) Melaka United	
1 December 2016	GK	(Malaysia) Mohd Fadzley Rahim	(Malaysia) Melaka United	
1 December 2016	MF	(Malaysia) Mohd Saiful Mustafa	(Malaysia) Melaka United	
1 December 2016	DF	(Malaysia) Muhd Afiq Azuan	(Malaysia) Melaka United	
1 December 2016	MF	(Malaysia) Iskandar Hanapiah	(Malaysia) Melaka United	
1 December 2016	DF	(Malaysia) Muhd Farid Azmi	(Malaysia) Felcra	
5 December 2016	FW	(Malaysia) Wong Kah Heng	(Malaysia) Selangor Chinese FA	
5 December 2016	DF	(Malaysia) Mohd Faizal Mansor	(Malaysia) DRB-Hicom F.C.	
5 December 2016	DF	(Malaysia) Abdullah Yusoff	(Malaysia) DRB-Hicom F.C.	
5 December 2016	FWD	(Malaysia) Fandi Ahmad	(Malaysia) Perlis FA	
5 December 2016	MF	(Malaysia) J. Thanasegar	(Malaysia) Megah Murni F.C.	
5 December 2016	MF	(Malaysia) Mohd Zuhairi Khalid	(Malaysia) PKNS F.C.	
5 December 2016	GK	(Malaysia) Amirul Aiman Amran	(Malaysia) Selangor FA	
5 December 2016	DF	(Malaysia) Nicholas Wee	(Malaysia) HELP University F.C.	
5 December 2016	DF	(Malaysia) Mohd Badrul Afendy Fadzil	(Malaysia) Sabah FA	
5 December 2016	GK	(Malaysia) Fairul Azwan Shahrullai	(Malaysia) Felda United F.C.	
5 December 2016	ST	(Malaysia) Haziq Fikri Hussein	(Malaysia) PDRM FA	

Out:

Date	Pos.	Player	To	Note
29 November 2016	MF	(Malaysia) Khyril Muhymeen Zambri	(Malaysia) PKNS FC	
29 November 2016	DF	(Malaysia) Abdul Thaufiq Abdul Haq	(Malaysia) Melaka United	
29 November 2016	MF	(Malaysia) Azidan Sarudin	(Malaysia) Kuala Lumpur FA	
29 November 2016	GK	(Malaysia) Mohd Syamsuri Mustafa	(Malaysia) Terengganu City F.C.	
29 November 2016	GK	(Malaysia) Izzat Abdul Rahim	(Malaysia) DBKL S.C.	
29 November 2016	DF	(Malaysia) Mohd Hasmarul Fadzir Hassan	(Malaysia) PBMS F.C.	
29 November 2016	DF	(Malaysia) Mohd Shaiful Nizam Saad	(Malaysia)	
29 November 2016	DF	(Malaysia) Muhd Ariff Zulkifly	(Malaysia)	
29 November 2016	DF	(Malaysia) Fairuz Abdul Aziz	(Malaysia) Shah Alam Antlers F.C.	
29 November 2016	DF	(Malaysia) S. Harivarman	(Malaysia) MISC-MIFA	
29 November 2016	DF	(Malaysia) Muhd Hazwan Abdul Rahman	(Malaysia) Kuala Lumpur FA	
29 November 2016	DF	(Malaysia) Muzammer Mohd Zaki	(Malaysia)	
29 November 2016	MF	(Malaysia) Muhd Rahmat Zainol	(Malaysia)	
29 November 2016	MF	(Malaysia) Mohd Hafiszuan Salehuddin	(Malaysia) Perlis FA	
29 November 2016	MF	(Malaysia) Syamsol Sabtu	(Malaysia) Airasia F.C.	
29 November 2016	MF	(Malaysia) Mohd Izaire Mohd Radzi	(Malaysia)	
29 November 2016	MF	(Malaysia) Muhd Fikri Elhan	(Malaysia) DBKL S.C.	
29 November 2016	MF	(Malaysia) Fadzly Iskandar Adnan	(Malaysia)	
29 November 2016	MF	(Malaysia) Abdul Rahman Abdul Ghani	(Malaysia)	
29 November 2016	MF	(Malaysia) Mohd Badrul Hisani	(Malaysia)	
29 November 2016	MF	(Malaysia) Rosli Muda	(Malaysia)	
29 November 2016	MF	(Malaysia) Amir Asyraf Jamaludin	(Malaysia)	
29 November 2016	FWD	(Malaysia) Zamri Morshidi	(Malaysia)	
29 November 2016	FWD	(Malaysia) Khairol Azry Abdul Rahman	(Malaysia)	
29 November 2016	MF	(Malaysia) K. Satish	(Malaysia) PKNS F.C. (Loan Return)	

=== Sime Darby ===
In:

Date	Pos.	Player	From	Note
Dec 2016	GK	(Malaysia) Mohd Hafiz Abu Bakar	(Malaysia) DRB-Hicom F.C.	
Dec 2016	DC	(Malaysia) Muhd Azrul Razman	(Malaysia) Selangor U21	
Dec 2016	DC	(Malaysia) Che Mohd Arif Che Kamarudin	(Malaysia) Terengganu U21	
Dec 2016	DL	(Malaysia) Mohd Fauzan Nazhif	(Malaysia) Negeri Sembilan U21	
Dec 2016	DR	(Malaysia) Mohd Khairul Rosmadi	(Malaysia) Hanelang F.C.	
Dec 2016	DC	(Malaysia) Tunku Noor Hidayat	(Malaysia) Penang U21	
Dec 2016	RW	(Malaysia) Amirul Syazani Roslan	(Malaysia) Sungai Ara F.C.	
Dec 2016	LW	(Malaysia) Mohd Faiz Shahiza	(Malaysia) Penang U21	
Dec 2016	DM	(Malaysia) Mohd Ikhmal Ibrahim	(Malaysia) Penang FA	
Dec 2016	AM	(Malaysia) Muhd Junaidi Shafiai	(Malaysia) Penang U21	
Dec 2016	MC	(Malaysia) Mohd Aizat Mohd Asli	(Malaysia) Terengganu U21	
Dec 2016	MC	(Malaysia) Saiful Hasnol Mohd Raffi	(Malaysia) UKM F.C.	
Dec 2016	ST	(Malaysia) Mohd Hasrolsywal Hamid	(Malaysia) Terengganu FA	
Dec 2016	ST	(Malaysia) Nik Azlam Nik Januaha	(Malaysia) N.Nine F.C.	

Out:

Date	Pos.	Player	To	Note
November 2016	MF	(Malaysia) Syed Sobri Syed Mohamad	(Malaysia) Melaka United	
November 2016	DF	(Malaysia) Mohd Akmal Md Zahir	(Malaysia) Melaka United	
November 2016	GK	(Malaysia) Kamarul Effandi Abdul Rahim	(Malaysia) Kuala Lumpur FA	
November 2016	GK	(Malaysia) Mohd Redzuan Harun	(Malaysia) PBMS F.C.	
November 2016	DF	(Malaysia) Muhd Shazlan Abu Samah	(Malaysia) UiTM	
November 2016	DF	(Malaysia) Wan Arfan Wan Ibrahim	(Malaysia) T-Team U21	
November 2016	DF	(Malaysia) Nashriq Yahya	(Malaysia) DBKL F.C.	
November 2016	DF	(Malaysia) Chairi Emmir	(Malaysia) DBKL F.C.	
November 2016	DF	(South Korea) Ha Dae-won		
November 2016	DF	(Malaysia) K. Prabakaran	(Malaysia) Perlis FA	
November 2016	DF	(Malaysia) Mohd Rafizi Hamdan	(Malaysia) UKM F.C.	
November 2016	MF	(Malaysia) Nur Areff Kamaruddin	(Malaysia) PBMS F.C.	
November 2016	RW/ST	(Malaysia) Mohd Rafiq Shah Zaim	(Malaysia) Felda United F.C.	
November 2016	MF	(Ivory Coast) Frederic Pooda	(Malaysia) PDRM FA	
November 2016	MF	(Malaysia) Muhd Rizqi Azman	(Malaysia) Felda United F.C.	
November 2016	MF	(Malaysia) Mohd Faiz Isa	(Malaysia)	
November 2016	ST	(Croatia) Mateo Roskam	(Malaysia) Sarawak FA	
November 2016	ST	(Nigeria) Obi Ikechukwu Charles		
November 2016	ST	(Malaysia) Mohd Firdaus Azizul	(Malaysia) Felcra F.C.	
November 2016	ST	(Malaysia) Muhd Firdaus Kasim	(Malaysia) Released	

=== Shahzan Muda ===
In:

Date	Pos.	Player	From	Note
December 2016	GK	(Malaysia) Muhd Yusuf Akma	(Malaysia) Pahang U21	
December 2016	LB	(Malaysia) Mohd Hilmi Husaini	(Malaysia) Pahang U21	
December 2016	RB	(Malaysia) Khairun Annas Ibrahim	(Malaysia) Pahang U21	
December 2016	RB	(Malaysia) Azuan Izam	(Malaysia) PBMM F.C.	
December 2016	CB	(Malaysia) Mohd Badrul Amin Mohd Yusof	(Malaysia) Pahang U19	
December 2016	LB	(Malaysia) Mohd Shahrizan Salleh	(Malaysia) Pahang FA	
December 2016	CB	(Malaysia) Ridhwan Maidin	(Malaysia) Pahang FA	
December 2016	DMC	(Malaysia) Nor Azizul Hafiz	(Malaysia) Felda Utd U21	
December 2016	CM	(Malaysia) Rizua Shafiqi	(Malaysia) Pahang FA	
December 2016	CM	(Malaysia) Helmi Abdullah	(Malaysia) Pahang FA	
December 2016	RW	(Malaysia) Mohd Shafizi Mohd Zain	(Malaysia) Free agents	
December 2016	ST	(Malaysia) Shafie Zahari	(Malaysia) Pahang FA	
December 2016	ST	(Malaysia) Faizal Rani	(Malaysia) Pahang FA	
December 2016	ST	(Malaysia) Amirul Kasmuri	(Malaysia) Pahang FA	

Out:

Date	Pos.	Player	To	Note
Nov 2016	GK	(Malaysia) Muhd Syuaib Saffiq	(Malaysia)	
Nov 2016	GK	(Malaysia) Mohd Azham Mohd Azli	(Malaysia)	
Nov 2016	DC	(Malaysia) Abdul Hazim Mohamad	(Malaysia)	
Nov 2016	DC	(Malaysia) Osman Damanhuri	(Malaysia)	
Nov 2016	DC	(Malaysia) Mohd Azwan Mohd Soadi	(Malaysia)	
Nov 2016	DR	(Malaysia) Muhd Jafrizan Mat Jid	(Malaysia)	
Nov 2016	RCM	(Malaysia) Mohd Shafiq Baharudin	(Malaysia)	
Nov 2016	RLW	(Malaysia) Muhd Baqiuddin Shamsudin	(Malaysia) Kuantan FA	
Nov 2016	AMC	(Malaysia) Muhd Afham Zulkipeli	(Malaysia) DBKL S.C.	
Nov 2016	MC	(Malaysia) Muharam Mohamad	(Malaysia)	
Nov 2016	AMC	(Malaysia) Ahmad Nazrin Ahmad Nazim	(Malaysia) DBKL S.C.	
Nov 2016	RM	(Malaysia) Muhd Asyraf Talib	(Malaysia) SAMB FC	
Nov 2016	ST	(Malaysia) Muhd Razren Mohd Jesni	(Malaysia)	
Nov 2016	ST	(Malaysia) Abdul Hadi Sulaiman	(Malaysia)	

=== Sungai Ara ===
In:

Date	Pos.	Player	From	Note

Out:

Date	Pos.	Player	To	Note

=== Terengganu City ===
In:

Date	Pos.	Player	From	Note
29/12/2016	MF	(Malaysia) Zairo Anuar	(Malaysia) Terengganu FA	
30/12/2016	GK	(Malaysia) Mohd Syamsuri Mustafa	(Malaysia) PJ Rangers	
30/12/2016	ST	(Malaysia) Mohd Hazazi Marzuki	(Malaysia) Kuala Nerus FA	
31/12/2016	ST	(Malaysia) Muhd Danial Ismail	(Australia) Ahly Perth FC	
1/1/2017	AMRL	(Malaysia) Mohd Asysham Asri	(Malaysia) SAMB F.C.	
1/1/2017	DC	(Malaysia) Muhd Munawar Shavukath Ali	(Malaysia) MISC-MIFA	
1/1/2017	AMRL	(Malaysia) Shafuan Adli Shaari	(Malaysia) Sabah FA	
1/1/2017	ST	(Malaysia) Haris Safwan Kamal	(Malaysia) Free agents	
1/1/2017	AM/ST	(Malaysia) Syam Shahril Ghulam	(Malaysia) Free agents	
1/1/2017	GK	(Malaysia) Muhd Muslim Yusof	(Malaysia) Hanelang F.C.	
1/1/2017	GK	(Malaysia) Mohd Zairi Hafiezi Idris	(Malaysia) Kuantan FA	
1/1/2017	DC	(Malaysia) Mohd Zahieruddin Zakaria	(Malaysia) Dungun FA	
1/1/2017	DL	(Malaysia) Mohd Akid Abdul Wahab	(Malaysia) Terengganu FA	
1/1/2017	DR	(Malaysia) Muhamad Shahimi Kharuddin	(Malaysia) Terengganu FA	
1/1/2017	DC	(Malaysia) Muhammad Zulhairi Ismail	(Malaysia) Terengganu FA	
1/1/2017	DC	(Malaysia) Mohamad Fadzlihadi Mamat	(Malaysia) Terengganu FA	
1/1/2017	DC	(Malaysia) Muhd Shafiquddin Ibrahim	(Malaysia) Hulu Terengganu FA	
1/1/2017	ST	(Malaysia) Ros Muhd Muharam Wahab	(Malaysia) Kuala Terengganu FA	
1/1/2017	DM	(Malaysia) Mohd Nurhalis Syafiq Mohd Nizu	(Malaysia) Felda United F.C.	
1/1/2017	MC	(Malaysia) Saiful Nizam Abdullah	(Malaysia) T-Team F.C.	

Out:

Date	Pos.	Player	To	Note

=== UKM ===
In:

Date	Pos.	Player	From	Note
Dec 2016	GK	(Malaysia) Muhd Hafizi Sudin	(Malaysia) Negeri Sembilan FA	
Dec 2016	GK	(Malaysia) Abdul Gafur Samsudin	(Malaysia) Penang FA	
Dec 2016	DC	(Malaysia) Muhd Azryl Reza Zamri	(Malaysia) Kedah FA	
Dec 2016	DR/MR	(Malaysia) Mohd Rafizi Hamdan	(Malaysia) Sime Darby F.C.	
Dec 2016	LW	(Malaysia) V. Ghopi	(Malaysia) Megah Murni F.C.	
Dec 2016	RW	(Malaysia) Mohd Faizol Fazree Ismail	(Malaysia) Penjara F.C.	
Dec 2016	LW	(Malaysia) Helmi Hariri Ibrahim	(Malaysia) MOF F.C.	
Dec 2016	MC	(Malaysia) Awangku Mohamad Hamirullizam	(Malaysia) Felda United F.C.	
Dec 2016	ST	(Malaysia) Muhd Nurzaidi Bunari	(Malaysia) Negeri Sembilan FA	
Dec 2016	ST	(Malaysia) Wan Mohd Faiz Wan Sulaiman	(Malaysia) Penjara F.C.	
Dec 2016	ST	(Malaysia) Adam Aidil Iskandar	(Malaysia) Felda United F.C.	
Dec 2016	ST	(Malaysia) Muhd Hasrul Nurkholis Hasim	(Malaysia) Free agents	

Out:

Date	Pos.	Player	To	Note
Dec 2016	GK	(Malaysia) Badrol Hanapi Ali	(Malaysia) Shah Alam Antlers	
Dec 2016	GK	(Malaysia) Ku Muhd Firdaus Ku Zulkhairi	(Malaysia) Kuala Lumpur FA	
Dec 2016	DC	(Malaysia) Faiz Mohd Bandong	(Malaysia) UiTM F.C.	
Dec 2016	MC	(Malaysia) Saiful Hasnol Mohd Raffi	(Malaysia) Sime Darby F.C.	
Dec 2016	AMRLC	(Malaysia) Muhd Asyidi Dilashar Yusof	(Malaysia) Penjara F.C.	
Dec 2016	LW	(Malaysia) Mohd Adib Abu Bakar	(Malaysia) Kuala Lumpur FA	
Dec 2016	RW	(Malaysia) Che Mohd Safwan Hazman	(Malaysia) Perlis FA	
Dec 2016	ST	(Malaysia) Muhd Ridzuan Kamis	(Malaysia) PBMS F.C.	
Dec 2016	ST	(Malaysia) Muhd Hadzirun Che Hamid	(Malaysia) DBKL S.C.	
Dec 2016	GK	(Malaysia) Mohd Farhan Aswad Badrisham	(Malaysia)	
Dec 2016	DC	(Malaysia) Muhd Farhan Hazmi Mohd Nasir	(Malaysia)	
Dec 2016	DC	(Malaysia) Mohd Suffian Saad	(Malaysia)	
Dec 2016	DL	(Malaysia) Mohd Hafizulldin Mohd Noor	(Malaysia)	
Dec 2016	RM/RB	(Malaysia) Mohd Nazri Muslim	(Malaysia)	
Dec 2016	DM	(Malaysia) Muhd Amirul Ashraf Din	(Malaysia)	

== See also ==
- 2017 Malaysia Super League
- 2017 Malaysia Premier League
- 2017 Malaysia FAM League
- 2017 Malaysia FA Cup
- 2017 Malaysia Cup
- 2017 Malaysia President's Cup
- 2017 Malaysia Youth League
- Football Association of Malaysia
- Malaysian football league system
