= Megah Murni F.C. =

Malaysian football club

Megah Murni FC
- Full name: Megah Murni Football Club
- Ground: UPM Stadium
- Chairman: Gunabalan a/l Gunaratnam
- Coach: R. Nallathamby

Megah Murni FC (official name Megah Murni Football Club) is a Malaysian football club based in Serdang, Selangor. They most recently played in the third-tier division in Malaysian football, the Malaysia FAM League in 2015.

== Kit manufacturer and shirt sponsor ==
Period	Kit manufacturer	Shirt sponsor
2015-2016	Line 7	

== Players ==
=== Current squad ===
No.	Name	Nationality	Position	D.O.B
Goalkeeper
100	Mohd Noor Hafis Che Haron	(Malaysia)	GK	13/6/93
13	Ilyaf Abdullah Sani	(Malaysia)	GK	25/9/88
1	Mohd Daniel Bin Laili	(Malaysia) (South Korea)	GK	17/11/94
	Murali a/l Sivam	(Malaysia)	GK	4/11/92
2	Leo Higuita	(Kazakhstan)	Goalkeeper	
Defenders
2	Mohd Hazwan Nizam Fazil	(Malaysia)	RB, RWB	23/7/93
3	Hasrul Abu Bakar	(Malaysia)	CB, DM, LB	11/8/87
32	Mohammad Najeeb Rosedin Moreira da Silva	(Malaysia) (Brazil)	Universal, Goalkeeper	12/12/94
11	Ragunantharen a/l Sathiaseelan	(Malaysia)	CB	7/1/94
12	Annbarasan a/l Maniarasu	(Malaysia)	LB, LWB	20/1/88
16	Visvanantan a/l Krishenamani	(Malaysia)	CB	24/8/90
17	Kumar a/l Sithambram	(Malaysia)	RB, RWB	1980
21	Khishan Raj a/l Mohana Raj	(Malaysia)	CB, RB	4/1/95
23	Mohd Rushdi Addrus (captain)	(Malaysia)	CB, DM, CM	14/10/83
14	Rodrigo Araújo	(Brazil)	CB	
25	Muhammad Haris Hamsah	(Malaysia)	RB, LB, RWB, LWB	2/3/99
29	Nur Adli Effendi Mohd Pauzi	(Malaysia)	LB, LWB	25/5/89
3	Zharil Izad	(Malaysia)	LB, LWB	
Midfielders
4	Mohamad bin Taufiq	(Malaysia)	CM	9/4/93
10	Robinho	(Russia)	Winger	
6	Mathivaanan a/l Rajan	(Malaysia)	RM, RW	25/7/92
7	Sivachandran a/l Gunasekaran	(Malaysia)	AM, CM	10/5/86
8	Ragunathan a/l Ulaganathan	(Malaysia)	DM, CM	20/3/92
27	Harith Mika (vice captain)	(Malaysia) (Germany)	LMF, LW	
7	Mohd Khairul Effendy	(Malaysia)	Winger	
29	Alex Merlim	(Italy)	Winger	
15	Iqhmal	(Malaysia) (Terengganu)	DM, CM, CB	
28	David a/l John Baptist	(Malaysia)	RM, RW	9/10/97
30	Mohd Norhafizzan Mohd Noor	(Malaysia)	AM, CM	1/12/89
	Paneerselvam a/l Palaniandy	(Malaysia)	AM, CM	5/3/88
	Sasikumar a/l Veeman	(Malaysia)	LM, LW	4/5/94
Forwards
9	Naven a/l Devarajoo	(Malaysia)	ST	19/7/94
		(Malaysia)	ST	
14	Darshen Ganesan Pillay	(Malaysia)	ST	14/9/94
19	Mohd Badrul Hisyam Azmi	(Malaysia)	ST	30/4/89
26	Adrian Arwin Michal a/l Kalidasan	(Malaysia)	ST	20/9/97
8	Francisco Solano	(Spain)	Pivot	
11	Vinícius Rocha	(Brazil)	Pivot	

== 2016 Transfers ==
For recent transfers, see List of Malaysian football transfers 2017 and List of Malaysian football transfers summer 2016

=== In ===
Pos.	Name	From
	(Malaysia) Ilyaf Abdullah Sani	(Malaysia) AirAsia F.C.
	(Malaysia) Hasrul Abu Bakar	(Malaysia) DRB-Hicom F.C.
	(Malaysia) S. Murali	(Malaysia) MBSA F.C.
	(Malaysia) Mohd Noor Hafis Che Haron	(Malaysia) MOF F.C.
	(Malaysia) R. Mathivaanan	(Malaysia) Real Mulia F.C.
	(Malaysia) A. Varathan	(Malaysia) Sarawak FA
	(Malaysia) G. Mahathevan	(Malaysia) Sarawak FA
	(Malaysia) Darshen Ganesan Pillay	(Malaysia) PKNS FC
	(Malaysia) S. Ragunantharen	(Malaysia) PKNS FC
	(Malaysia) D. Naven	(Malaysia) Selangor U21
	(Malaysia) Muhd Syafiq Johari	
	(Malaysia) P. Paneerselvam	

=== Out ===
Pos.	Name	To
	(Malaysia) Muhd Azwan Jatin	(Malaysia) Ipoh FA
	(Malaysia) K. Ravindran	(Malaysia) MISC-MIFA
	(Malaysia) P. Haresh	(Malaysia) MISC-MIFA
	(Malaysia) Amir Omar Khata	(Malaysia) Sungai Ara F.C.
	(Malaysia) G. Rohan	(Malaysia) UiTM F.C.
	(Malaysia) Badrol Hanapi Ali	(Malaysia) UKM F.C.
	(Malaysia) A. Luveen Visnu	
	(Malaysia) Azuwan Abdul Rahman	
	(Malaysia) E. Lohindran	
	(Malaysia) Fazuan Abdullah	
	(Malaysia) K. Sivabalan	
	(Malaysia) M. Anbalagan	
	(Malaysia) M. Shathees	
	(Malaysia) Mohd Alif Haikal Ganaeson	
	(Malaysia) Mohd Iqbal Ibrahim Daud	
	(Malaysia) Mohd Supian Heri	
	(Malaysia) Muhd Noor Sulaimi Saidi	
	(Malaysia) S. Andrew	
	(Malaysia) V. Jeetendra	
	(Malaysia) Wan Mohd Azwari Wan Nor	

== Club officials ==
- President : (Malaysia) Gunabalan a/l Gunaratnam
- Manager : (Malaysia) Tamilselvan a/l Sankupillai
- Head Coach : (Malaysia) R. Nallathamby
- Assistant Coach : (Malaysia) Saravanan a/l Subramaniam
- Goalkeeping Coach : (Malaysia)
- Fitness Coach : (Malaysia)
- Physio : (Malaysia) Prem Ghanesh Chandra Segeran
- Kitman : (Malaysia)
- Security Officer : (Malaysia) Rajasegaran a/l S. Karupiah
- Media Officer : (Malaysia) Hema a/p Pachapan

== Coaches ==
Tenure	Coach
Jan 2015-Jun 2015	(Malaysia) K. Thaiyanathan
