= Fairul Azwan Shahrullai =

Malaysian footballer

Fairul Azwan
Personal information
- Full name: Mohd Fairul Azwan bin Shahrullai
- Date of birth: 20 March 1987 (age 39)
- Place of birth: Selangor, Malaysia
- Height: 1.76 m (5 ft 9 in)
- Position: Goalkeeper

Team information
- Current team: Petaling Jaya Rangers F.C.
- Number: 1

Youth career
- 2006–2008: Selangor President's Cup Team

Senior career*
Years	Team	Apps	(Gls)
2009 – 2013	Selangor FA	12	(0)
2014 – 2016	Felda United F.C.	11	(0)
2017–	Petaling Jaya Rangers F.C.	0	(0)
- * Club domestic league appearances and goals as of January 23, 2017 ‡ National team caps and goals as of January 23, 2017

Mohd Fairul Azwan Shahrullai (born 20 March 1987 in Selangor) is a Malaysian goalkeeper currently playing for FELDA United F.C. in Malaysia Super League.

== Career ==
=== Selangor President Cup Team ===
Fairul Azwan started playing for the Selangor President's Cup Team in 2008. He was the team's main goalkeeper and helped Selangor to win President's Cup in the 2007-08 President Cup Malaysia defeated Perak President's Cup Team 1–0 in final.

=== Selangor FA ===
Then, he promoted to Selangor FA from Selangor President's Cup Team.
