= Julamri Muhammad =

Malaysian footballer

Personal information
- Full name: Julamri Bin Muhammad
- Date of birth: 18 October 1985 (age 41)
- Place of birth: Tawau, Sabah, Malaysia
- Height: 1.64 m (5 ft 4 1/2 in)
- Positions: Left midfielder; left-back

Team information
- Current team: PDRM
- Number: 2

Youth career
- 2004: Sabah FA President's Team

Senior career*
Years	Team	Apps	(Gls)
2005–2016	Sabah	101	(8)
2017–	PDRM	8	(0)
- * Club domestic league appearances and goals as of 19 September 2017

Julamri Bin Muhammad (born 18 October 1985) is a Malaysian footballer who plays for PDRM FA in Malaysia Premier League as a left back and sometimes as a left midfielder.
