= Syamsol Sabtu =

Malaysian footballer

Personal information
- Full name: Mohd Syamsol bin Sabtu
- Date of birth: August 30, 1985 (age 41)
- Place of birth: Malacca, Malaysia
- Height: 1.75 m (5 ft 9 in)
- Position: Centre back

Youth career
- 2001–2004: Negeri Sembilan President's Cup Team

Senior career*
Years	Team	Apps	(Gls)
2005–2011	Negeri Sembilan	98	(8)
2015	PJ Rangers FC		

International career
2006–2007	Malaysia U-23	9	(0)
2008–2009	Malaysia	1	(0)
- * Club domestic league appearances and goals

Syamsol Sabtu (born 30 August 1985) is a Malaysian professional footballer. One of the graduates from the U23 national team, Syamsol became involved in the senior team after the successful 2007 Merdeka Cup.
