= Petaling Jaya Rangers F.C. =

Malaysian football club

Petaling Jaya Rangers
- Full name: Petaling Jaya Rangers Football Club
- Nickname(s): The Rangers
- Short name: PJR
- Founded: 9 August 2011; 13 years ago
- Dissolved: 2019
- Ground: AirAsia-MBPJ Stadium
- Capacity: 25,000
- Owner: AirAsia Group
- Chairman: Tony Fernandes
- Head coach: Khairul Anuar Jamil
- League: Selangor Super League
- 2019: Super League, 6th

Petaling Jaya Rangers Football Club or PJ Rangers was a professional football club based in Petaling Jaya, in the state of Selangor, Malaysia. Founded in 2011, the club's main ground was the AirAsia Stadium.

In 2018, they played in the third division Malaysia FAM League after being promoted from Selangor Super League in 2014. The club was formerly known as AirAsia Allstars, before being rebranded in December 2016 to Petaling Jaya Rangers F.C.

== History ==
=== Origins ===
Petaling Jaya Rangers Football Club was formed on 9 August 2011 as its former name AirAsia Allstars Football Club and competed in the Selangor State League. According to founder Datuk Kamarudin Meranun, the initial purpose of the club was to "encourage AirAsia’s staff to excel in sports – football in particular – besides being committed to their daily work in keeping AirAsia as the best low cost airline in the world." The club won the league and were promoted to play in the national league, Malaysia FAM League.

=== Promotion to Malaysia FAM League ===
The club was promoted to the Malaysia FAM League for the 2015 season after moving up from the Selangor Super League. For their first season in the national league, the club appointed Mohd Nidzam Jamil as the new head coach. The club ended its first season at 7th place. After the first four matches of the 2016 season, the club replaced Nidzam Jamil with P. Maniam for the remainder of the season. The club managed to reach the playoff for the Malaysia Premier League after finishing the season in 3rd place, although did not manage to be promoted.

=== Rebranded as Petaling Jaya Rangers ===
In November 2016, the club has announced the appointment of Mat Zan Mat Aris as the new head coach with a contract of two years. Mat Zan Mat Aris was the former head coach of Melaka United who achieved a back-to-back promotion from the third division. They unveiled plans for the 2017 season with a rebranding from AirAsia F.C. to Petaling Jaya Rangers F.C., in order to bring more fans and promote local community support. The club also revealed its plans for 2017 with the focus on engaging communities. The club aimed to actively engage with and serve football fans in the area.

Petaling Jaya Rangers announced an exclusive partnership with Queens Park Rangers (QPR) to start a football academy. The academy aimed to nurture and train the next generation of footballers. Working together with the team, QPR lent their expertise in training players and staff. PJ Rangers were put in group B for the 2017 Malaysia FAM League, with seven other clubs. The club was knocked out from the 2017 Malaysia FA Cup in the second round after a 2–1 defeat by UiTM. At the end of the season, PJ Rangers finished second and were defeated by Shahzan Muda FC 3–1 in the quarter-finals of the knockout stage.

In the 2018 Malaysia FAM Cup season, the club again achieved second place in group B and qualified for the knockout stage. PJ Rangers failed at the penultimate stage when they were defeated 4–3 on aggregate to Selangor United. At the end of the season, the management announced that they would not participate in the next FAM Cup season, instead rejoining the Selangor Super League in 2019.

== Stadium ==
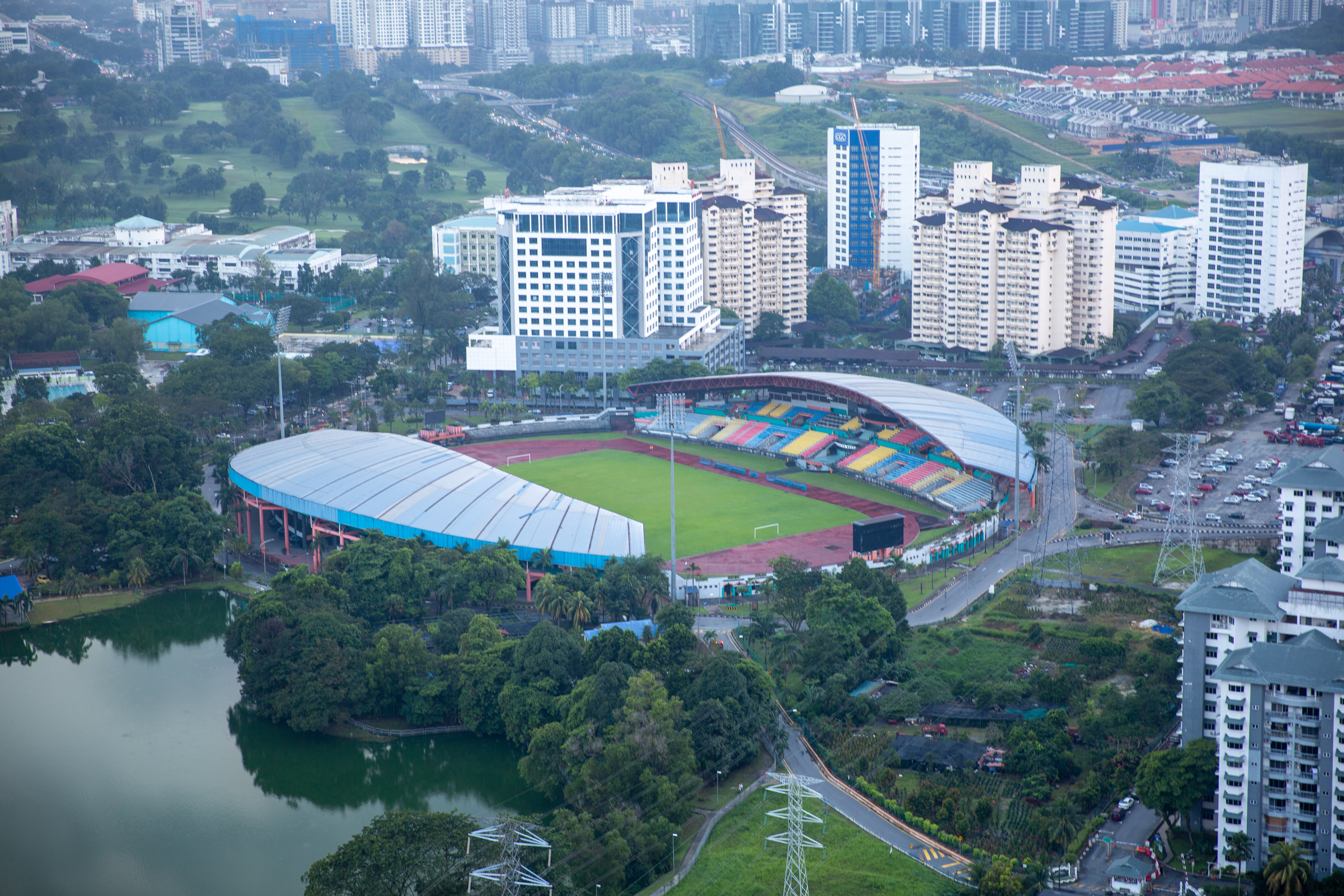
MBPJ Stadium

PJ Rangers home stadium was the Petaling Jaya Stadium in Petaling Jaya, Selangor. In 2015 Malaysia FAM League, the club played in MPSJ Stadium, Subang Jaya, before moving to UPM Mini Stadium, Serdang for the remainder of the season. For the second season, the club once again moved, to the Shah Alam Stadium.

== Crest and colours ==
The original crest, adopted when the club was founded in 2011 featured the logo of AirAsia as the main theme with the Allstars suffix. Despite the club being founded in 2011, the words "EST 2001" featured on the crest. This was reference to the establishment of the AirAsia company after Tune Air, bought it from a Malaysian government-owned company in September 2001. The crest was replaced with a new design to reflect the club's rebranding with a colour theme of maroon and gold for the 2017 season. The logo was designed by Rafizi Ibrahim, a freelance graphic designer who hails from Petaling Jaya himself. His winning design was chosen through a logo competition held in 2016 and was personally chosen by Tan Sri Tony Fernandes himself"

== Supporters ==
As part of the rebranding effort, the club changed its name to Petaling Jaya Rangers with the emphasis on engaging the Petaling Jaya community via community programs.

== Ownership and finances ==
The club aimed to be a sustainable self-funding entity and reduce its dependency on AirAsia via financial funding through other methods of corporate sponsorship, gate receipt, and merchandise.

=== Sponsorship ===
In 2016 The PJ Rangers kit was supplied by Line 7. The club has also had other shared shirt sponsors, as they have been previously sponsored by GE Aviation in 2015 season.

Period	Kit manufacturer	Shirt sponsor
2015	EGO SPORT	AirAsia / GE Aviation
2016	Line 7	AirAsia

== Season by season record ==
Season	League									Top goalscorer		FA Cup	Malaysia Cup /Challenge Cup
Season	Division	P	W	D	L	F	A	Pts	Pos	Name	Goals	FA Cup	Malaysia Cup /Challenge Cup
2015	FAM League	16	4	4	8	15	21	16	7th, group B			DNQ	DNQ
2016	FAM League	16	8	6	2	19	17	30	3rd, group A			Second round	DNQ
2017	FAM League	14	6	5	3	15	11	23	Quarter-finals			Second round	DNQ
2018	FAM League	8	4	2	2	17	9	14	Semi-finals	Raslam Khan	9	Second round	DNQ
2019	FAS Super League	8	3	2	3	8	8	11	6th	Syamsol Sabtu	3	DNQ	DNQ

== Players (2019) ==
Note: Flags indicate national team as defined under FIFA eligibility rules; some limited exceptions apply. Players may hold more than one non-FIFA nationality.

No.	Pos.	Nation	Player
1	GK	(Malaysia) MAS	Amirul Ashraf Rahman
2	DF	(Malaysia) MAS	Firdaus Rahmat
3	MF	(Malaysia) MAS	Abdul Jalil Rauf
4	DF	(Malaysia) MAS	Mohd Mahathir
5	DF	(Malaysia) MAS	Mohd Naim Hashim
6	MF	(Malaysia) MAS	Rahmat Zainol
7	FW	(Malaysia) MAS	Amirul Afiq Asri
8	FW	(Malaysia) MAS	Ahmed Fadzil
9	MF	(Malaysia) MAS	Izzudin Mat
10	FW	(Malaysia) MAS	Khairul Azahar
11	MF	(Malaysia) MAS	Syamsol Sabtu
12	MF	(Malaysia) MAS	Nurariff Daniel Zulkahar
14	FW	(Malaysia) MAS	Amirul Mat Amin

No.	Pos.	Nation	Player
15	FW	(Malaysia) MAS	Hezree Syafiq
16	DF	(Malaysia) MAS	Tuah Iskandar
17	MF	(Malaysia) MAS	Reeshafiq Alwi
18	MF	(Malaysia) MAS	Salahuddin Zambri
19	MF	(Malaysia) MAS	Abd Rahman Ghani
20	DF	(Malaysia) MAS	Mohd Firdaus Afandi
21	MF	(Malaysia) MAS	Rosli Muda
21	DF	(Malaysia) MAS	Wan Mohd Aminuddin
23	MF	(Malaysia) MAS	Shahril Izwan Abdullah
24	GK	(Malaysia) MAS	Noor Hafis Che Haron
25	DF	(Malaysia) MAS	Premanathan Karisnan
26	MF	(Malaysia) MAS	Nor Syafiq Syazwan
29	MF	(Malaysia) MAS	Hariri

=== Transfers ===
For recent transfers, see List of Malaysian football transfers 2018 and List of Malaysian football transfers 2017

== Head coaches ==
Year	Name
2014	(Malaysia) Asmawi Bakiri
January 2015–28 March 2016	(Malaysia) Mohd Nidzam Jamil
30 March–October 2016	(Malaysia) P. Maniam
November 2016–20 October 2017	(Malaysia) Mat Zan Mat Aris
20 October 2017 – 2018	(Malaysia) Hassan Sazali Waras
2019	(Malaysia) Khairul Anuar Jamil

== Management (2016) ==
Position	Name
Founder	(Malaysia) Kamarudin Meranun
Patron	(Malaysia) Tony Fernandes
President	(Malaysia) Riad Asmat
Deputy President	(Malaysia) Simon Lim
Vice President / Chief Finance Officer	(Malaysia) Mustaffa Ramly
Vice President II	(Malaysia) Victor William
Secretary	(Malaysia) Mohd. Fakhrurrazi Ismail
Treasurer	(Malaysia) Mustaffa Ramly
Security officer	(Malaysia) Govindran a/l Karuppiah
Media officers	(Malaysia) Mohd. Rizuan Bidin
Media officers	(Malaysia) Galvin Tan
Community manager	(Malaysia) Galvin Tan
Coordinator	(Malaysia) Melvin Jacob

== Coaching staff (2019) ==
Position	Name
Team manager	(Malaysia) Dato’ Halim Mu’azzam Bin Dato’ Ayob
Assistant manager	(Malaysia) Galvin Tan
Head coach	(Malaysia) Khairul Anuar Jamil
Assistant coach	(Malaysia) Mohd Fauzi Mohd Yaakob
Goalkeeping coach	(Malaysia) Muzaffar Shah Dzulkifli
Physiotherapist	(Malaysia) Muhammad Hafizzudin Mohd Ramli
Kitman	(Malaysia) Muhd Zukri Abd Hamid
