= Tuah Iskandar Jamaluddin =

Malaysian footballer

Personal information
- Full name: Muhamad Tuah Iskandar Bin Jamaluddin
- Date of birth: January 29, 1987 (age 39)
- Place of birth: Johor, Malaysia
- Height: 1.58 m (5 ft 2 in)
- Position: Defender

Youth career
- 2006–2010: Johor United

Senior career*
Years	Team	Apps	(Gls)
2011–2012	Johor Darul Ta'zim II	19	(0)
2013–2015	Perak	55	(0)
2016	Johor Darul Ta'zim II	10	(0)
2016	Perak	4	(0)
2017	PJ Rangers FC	9	(0)
2018	Hanelang	5	(0)
2019	PJ Rangers FC		

International career^{‡}
2016	Malaysia	1	(0)
- * Club domestic league appearances and goals ‡ National team caps and goals as of February 15, 2017

Muhamad Tuah Iskandar Bin Jamaluddin (born 29 January 1987) is a Malaysian professional footballer who plays as a defender.

== Honours ==
- Crown Prince of Johor Cup

- Winners (1): 2012
