= Redzuan Mohd Radzy =

Malaysian footballer

Redzuan Radzy
Personal information
- Full name: Redzuan Muhamad Radzy
- Date of birth: 5 April 1981 (age 45)
- Place of birth: Kedah, Malaysia
- Position: Defender

Team information
- Current team: KDMM F.C.
- Number: 5

Senior career*
Years	Team	Apps	(Gls)
2001	Kedah JKR		
2002	Kedah FA		
2003	Negeri Sembilan FA		
2004	Kedah FA		
2005–2006	Johor FC		
2006–2008	Sabah FA		
2009–2010	Johor PG		
2010	→Sabah FA (loan)		
2011–2013	MP Muar FC		
2013	Kedah United	13	(0)
2016	KDMM F.C.		

International career
2003	Malaysia	1	(0)
- * Club domestic league appearances and goals

Redzuan Muhamad Radzy (born 5 April 1981) is a Malaysian footballer who currently plays for KDMM F.C. in the Malaysia FAM League. He is the member of Malaysia senior team and Malaysia under-23 in 2003 until 2004.

He started his career with clubside Kedah JKR in 2001. He also the key player for Malaysia under-23 in 2001 and 2003 Southeast Asian Games.

In 2002, he won the 2002 Premier Two League with Kedah. On the next season, he move to Negeri Sembilan but return to Kedah. He later sign for Johor FC. In 2006, he released by his club and sign a deal with Sabah. He released after the season ended and join Johor Pasir Gudang in 2009.

He rejoined Sabah on loan in late 2010 for their Malaysia Cup campaign. For the 2011 season, he joins club side Muar Municipal Council FC.
