= 2011 Perak FA season =

Malaysian football season

Perak
2011 season
- President: Zainol Fadzi Paharudin
- Manager: Khairul Azwan Harun
- Head Coach: Norizan Bakar
- Stadium: Perak Stadium
- Super League: 6th
- FA Cup: Quarter-finals
- Malaysia Cup: Quarter-finals
- Top goalscorer: League: Akmal Rizal (9); All: Akmal Rizal (13)
Home colours	Away colours

The 2011 season was Perak's eighth consecutive season in the Malaysian Super League.

== Sponsors ==
=== Kit manufacturer ===
- Specs

=== Shirt sponsor ===
- Majlis Bandaraya Ipoh (MBI)

== Players ==
=== First team squad ===
As of 28 January 2011

Note: Flags indicate national team as defined under FIFA eligibility rules; some limited exceptions apply. Players may hold more than one non-FIFA nationality.

No.	Pos.	Nation	Player
1	GK	MAS	Khairul Amri
2	DF	MAS	Chan Wing Hoong
3	DF	MAS	Khairi Zainudin
4	DF	MAS	Syahman Zainuddin
5	DF	MAS	Arif Ismail
6	DF	MAS	Syazwan Roslan
8	MF	MAS	Shahrulnizam Mustapa (captain)
9	FW	MAS	Shafiq Jamal
10	MF	MAS	Nazri Kamal
11	MF	MAS	Badrul Azam
12	FW	MAS	Khairul Izzat Jamaluddin
13	MF	MAS	Wan Hossen

No.	Pos.	Nation	Player
14	FW	MAS	Akmal Rizal
15	DF	MAS	Azmeer Yusof
16	MF	MAS	Fazrul Hazli
17	MF	MAS	K. Nanthakumar
19	DF	MAS	Hazrul Mustafa
20	MF	MAS	Harizul Izuan
21	GK	MAS	Kamarul Effandi
22	MF	MAS	Isma Alif
23	FW	MAS	Razali Umar Kandasamy
24	DF	MAS	Hisyamudin Sha'ari
25	GK	MAS	Nasril Nourdin
31	FW	MAS	Failee Ghazli (on loan from USM for Malaysia Cup)

== Competitions ==
=== Super League ===
==== League table ====
Pos	Team	Pld	W	D	L	GF	GA	GD	Pts
4	Kedah	26	13	6	7	25	20	+5	45
5	Harimau Muda A	26	12	7	7	38	28	+10	43
6	Perak	26	10	10	6	31	24	+7	40
7	Johor FC	26	8	10	8	26	28	−2	34
8	Negeri Sembilan	26	8	8	10	29	32	−3	32

Updated to match(es) played on unknown. Source: FIFA
Rules for classification: 1) Points; 2) Goal difference; 3) Number of goals scored.

=== FA Cup ===
Win Draw Loss

The 2011 Malaysia Cup, also known as the Astro Piala FA due to the competition's sponsorship by Astro Arena, involved 30 teams — 16 Super League and 14 Premier League sides.

Knockout stage

19 February 2011 First round	PDRM	1–4	Perak	Paroi, Negeri Sembilan
8:45 GMT	Khairul Izuan 60'		Akmal 6'; Shahrulnizam 30'; Shafiq 51'; Razali 89'	Stadium: Tuanku Abdul Rahman Stadium; Attendance: 10,000

4 March 2011 Second round	Perak	3–0	Sime Darby	Ipoh, Perak
8:45 GMT	Hazrul 81'; Razali 83'; Akmal 90+1'			Stadium: Perak Stadium; Attendance: 20,000

Quarter-finals

15 March 2011 First Leg	Perak	3–2	Terengganu	Ipoh, Perak
8:45 GMT	Isma 14'; Fazrul 70'; Akmal 82'		Manaf 40'; Reeshafiq 90'	Stadium: Perak Stadium

19 March 2011 Second Leg	Terengganu	3–1 (5–4 agg.)	Perak	Kuala Terengganu, Terengganu
8:45 GMT	Reeshafiq 29'; Manaf 51'; Hadi 80'		Akmal 76'	Stadium: Sultan Ismail Nasiruddin Shah Stadium

=== Malaysia Cup ===
==== Group stage ====
Team	Pld	W	D	L	GF	GA	GD	Pts
Perak FA	6	4	2	0	9	5	+4	14
Sabah FA	6	3	1	2	10	6	+4	10
Kedah FA	10	2	6	2	9	8	+1	12
Johor FA	6	0	1	5	7	16	−9	1

Win Draw Loss

6 September 2011 1	Sabah	0–0	Perak	Kota Kinabalu, Sabah
20:15		Report		Stadium: Likas Stadium; Attendance: 3,400

10 September 2011 2	Perak	2–1	Johor	Ipoh, Perak
20:45	Failee 29'; Shafiq 74' (pen.)		Azuwad Arip 88'	Stadium: Perak Stadium; Referee: Mohd Zohri Tajuddin

13 September 2011 3	Perak	2–1	Kedah	Ipoh, Perak
20:45	Shafiq 15'; Failee 36'		Khyril 34'	Stadium: Perak Stadium

17 September 2011 4	Perak	2–1	Sabah	Ipoh, Perak
20:45	Fazrul 4'; Failee 46' (pen.)		Shahrul 8'	Stadium: Perak Stadium

24 September 2011 5	Johor	1–2	Perak	Larkin, Johor Bahru
20:45	Arshadi 90+4'	Report	Shafiq 38'; Failee 90'	Stadium: Tan Sri Dato Hj Hassan Yunos Stadium

27 September 2011 6	Kedah	1–1	Perak	Alor Setar, Kedah
20:45	Faizal 56'	Report	Shafiq 53'	Stadium: Darul Aman Stadium

==== Quarter-finals ====
10 October 2011 First Leg	Selangor	3–1	Perak	Shah Alam, Selangor
20:45	Safiq 13', 58'; Hadi 63'	Report	Failee 76'	Stadium: Shah Alam Stadium

14 October 2011	Perak	0–1 (1–4 agg.)	Selangor	Ipoh, Perak
20:45		Report	Rudie 49'	Stadium: Perak Stadium; Referee: Zamzaidi Katimin

== Statistics ==
=== Top scorers ===
The list is sorted by shirt number when total goals are equal.

Rnk	Pos	No.	Player	Super League	FA Cup	Malaysia Cup	Total
1	FW	14	(Malaysia) Akmal Rizal	9	4	0	13
2	FW	19	(Malaysia) Shafiq Jamal	6	1	4	11
3	FW	23	(Malaysia) Razali Umar	4	2	0	6
4	FW	31	(Malaysia) Failee Ghazli	0	0	5	5
5	MF	8	(Malaysia) Shahrulnizam Mustapa	3	1	0	4
5	MF	16	(Malaysia) Fazrul Hazli	2	1	1	4
5	DF	19	(Malaysia) Hazrul Mustafa	3	1	0	4
8	MF	6	(Malaysia) Syazwan Roslan	2	0	0	2
9	MF	13	(Malaysia) Wan Hossen	1	0	0	1
9	MF	22	(Malaysia) Isma Alif	0	1	0	1
9	MF	30	(Malaysia) Shazuan Mathews	1	0	0	1
#	Own goals			0	0	0	0
Total				31	11	10	52

Updated to match played 21 September 2011
