= 2012 Perak FA season =

Malaysian football season

Perak
2012 season
- President: Zainol Fadzi Paharudin
- Manager: Khairul Azwan Harun
- Head Coach: Norizan Bakar (until 19 July); Jang Jung (from 19 July)
- Stadium: Perak Stadium
- Super League: 4th
- FA Cup: Round of 16
- Malaysia Cup: Group stage
- Top goalscorer: League: Michal Kubala (13); All: Michal Kubala (14)
Home colours	Away colours

The 2012 season was Perak Football Club's ninth consecutive season in the Malaysian Super League.

== Players ==
=== First team squad ===
As of 9 January 2012

Note: Flags indicate national team as defined under FIFA eligibility rules; some limited exceptions apply. Players may hold more than one non-FIFA nationality.

No.	Pos.	Nation	Player
1	GK	MAS	Khairul Amri
2	DF	MAS	Chan Wing Hoong
3	DF	MAS	Khairi Zainudin
5	DF	MAS	Shahrom Kalam
6	DF	MAS	Syazwan Roslan
7	MF	MAS	Fahrul Razi
8	MF	MAS	Shahrulnizam Mustapa (captain)
9	FW	SRB	Lazar Popović
10	MF	MAS	Nazri Kamal
11	MF	MAS	Badrul Azam
12	FW	MAS	Failee Ghazli
13	MF	MAS	Wan Hossen

No.	Pos.	Nation	Player
14	FW	MAS	Akmal Rizal
15	MF	MAS	Khalis Ibrahim
16	MF	MAS	Fazrul Hazli
17	MF	MAS	K. Nanthakumar
18	FW	MAS	Shafiq Jamal
19	DF	MAS	Hazrul Mustafa
20	MF	MAS	Rafiuddin Rodin
21	GK	MAS	Kamarul Effandi
22	MF	MAS	Isma Alif
23	GK	MAS	Nasril Nourdin
24	DF	MAS	Hisyamudin Sha'ari
25	MF	SRB	Michal Kubala

== Transfers ==
=== In ===
==== First transfer window ====
Pos	Player	Transferred From
DF	(Malaysia) Shahrom Kalam	(Malaysia) Kuala Lumpur
DF	(Malaysia) Badrul Azam	(Malaysia) Felda United
MF	(Malaysia) Rafiuddin Roddin	(Malaysia) Harimau Muda A
MF	(Malaysia) Fahrul Razi	(Malaysia) Kuala Lumpur
MF	(Malaysia) Nasir Basharudin	(Malaysia) MBI
MF	(Slovakia) Michal Kubala	(Romania) Astra Giurgiu
FW	(Serbia) Lazar Popović	(Bosnia and Herzegovina) Željezničar
FW	(Malaysia) Failee Ghazli	(Malaysia) USM

==== Second transfer window ====
Pos	Player	Transferred From
FW	(Cameroon) Albert Bodjongo	(Cameroon) Douala Athletic Club

=== Out ===
==== First transfer window ====
Pos	Player	Transferred To
DF	(Malaysia) Syahman Zainuddin	Unattached
DF	(Malaysia) Arif Ismail	(Malaysia) Sime Darby
DF	(Malaysia) Azmeer Yusof	POS Malaysia
DF	(Malaysia) Hafiszuan Salehuddin	(Malaysia) Felda United
DF	(Malaysia) Nurul Nasriq Kamaruddin	(Malaysia) MBI
MF	(Malaysia) Shahrul Hafiz Shafei	Unattached
MF	(Malaysia) Harizul Izuan	Unattached
FW	(Malaysia) Khairul Izzat Jamaluddin	(Malaysia) MBI
FW	(Malaysia) Razali Umar Kandasamy	(Malaysia) Sime Darby
FW	(Malaysia) Shazuan Ashraf Mathews	(Malaysia) Kedah

==== Second transfer window ====
Pos	Player	Transferred To
FW	(Serbia) Lazar Popović	(Albania) Kukësi

=== Loan in ===
Pos	Player	Loaned From
DF	(Malaysia) Reithaudin Awang Emran	(Malaysia) Sabah
DF	(Malaysia) Fariss Azlan	(Malaysia) Sabah
MF	(Malaysia) Zuraindey	(Malaysia) Sabah

* The players loaned in for Malaysia Cup campaign only.

== Competitions ==
=== Super League ===
==== League table ====
Pos	Team	Pld	W	D	L	GF	GA	GD	Pts	Qualification or relegation
2	LionsXII (Note: LionsXII are not eligible for any AFC competition spots)	26	15	5	6	48	23	+25	50	
3	Selangor (Q)	26	12	7	7	40	26	+14	43	2013 AFC Cup group stage (Note: Qualified as the next highest-placed local team behind Liga Super and 2012 Piala FA winners Kelantan.)
4	Perak	26	13	3	10	40	43	−3	42	
5	Terengganu	26	11	8	7	41	33	+8	41	
6	Negeri Sembilan	26	10	7	9	41	38	+3	37	

Source: RSSSF
Rules for classification: 1) points; 2) goal difference; 3) number of goals scored
(Q) Qualified for the phase indicated

=== FA Cup ===
Win Draw Loss

The draw was held on 13 December 2011 at Wisma FAM.

17 February 2012 Round of 32	Perak	1–0	ATM	Ipoh, Perak
20:45 UTC+08:00	Kubala 3'			Stadium: Perak Stadium; Attendance: 20,000

10 March 2012 Round of 16	Terengganu	1–0	Perak	Kuala Terengganu, Terengganu
20:45 UTC+08:00	Ashaari 45+4'			Stadium: Sultan Ismail Nasiruddin Shah Stadium; Attendance: 25,000; Referee: Sokri Nor

=== Malaysia Cup ===
==== Group stage ====
Pos	Team	Pld	W	D	L	GF	GA	GD	Pts
1	Negeri Sembilan FA (A)	6	2	4	0	8	3	+5	10
2	(Kuala Lumpur) Felda United FC (A)	6	1	4	1	13	12	+1	7
3	Perak FA	6	1	3	2	7	9	−2	6
4	(Kuala Lumpur) Sime Darby FC	6	1	3	2	9	13	−4	6

(A) Advanced to knockout stage

Win Draw Loss

22 August 2012 1	Sime Darby	1–1	Perak	Selayang, Selangor
20:45 UTC+08:00	Teofilo 64'		Fahrul Razi 89'	Stadium: Majlis Perbandaran Selayang Stadium; Attendance: 3,480

25 August 2012 2	Perak	2–4	Felda United	Ipoh, Perak
20:45 UTC+08:00	Nazri 62', 86'	Report	Antoine-Curier 27'; Nasir 32' (o.g.); Fakri 38'; Raimi 68'	Stadium: Perak Stadium

8 August 2012 3	Negeri Sembilan	0–0	Perak	Paroi, Negeri Sembilan
20:45 UTC+08:00				Stadium: Tuanku Abdul Rahman Stadium

1 September 2012 4	Perak	0–1	Negeri Sembilan	Ipoh, Perak
20:45 UTC+08:00			Owona 45+3' (pen.)	Stadium: Perak Stadium; Attendance: 7,000

4 September 2012 5	Felda United	2–2	Perak	Ayer Keroh, Malacca
20:45 UTC+08:00	Farderin 7'; Antoine-Curier 83'		Shahrom 3'; Fazrul 48'	Stadium: Hang Jebat Stadium

14 September 2012 6	Perak	2–1	Sime Darby	Ipoh, Perak
20:45 UTC+08:00	Bodjongo 12', 48'		Faiz Isa 90+4'	Stadium: Perak Stadium

== Statistics ==
=== Top scorers ===
The list is sorted by shirt number when total goals are equal.

Rnk	Pos	No.	Player	Super League	FA Cup	Malaysia Cup	Total
1	FW	25	(Serbia) Michal Kubala	13	1	0	14
2	FW	9	(Cameroon) Albert Bodjongo	7	0	2	9
3	FW	14	(Malaysia) Akmal Rizal	5	0	0	5
4	MF	7	(Malaysia) Fahrul Razi	2	0	1	3
4	MF	10	(Malaysia) Nazri Kamal	1	0	2	3
4	MF	16	(Malaysia) Fazrul Hazli	2	0	1	3
4	MF	20	(Malaysia) Rafiuddin Rodin	3	0	0	3
8	DF	5	(Malaysia) Shahrom Kalam	1	0	1	2
8	FW	18	(Malaysia) Shafiq Jamal	2	0	0	2
9	FW	9	(Serbia) Lazar Popović	1	0	0	1
9	FW	12	(Malaysia) Failee Ghazli	1	0	0	1
#	Own goals			2	0	0	0
Total				40	1	7	48

Updated to match played 21 September 2012
