= 2013 Perak FA season =

Malaysian football season

Perak
2013 season
- President: Zainol Fadzi Paharudin
- Manager: Khairul Azwan Harun
- Head Coach: Azraai Khor
- Stadium: Perak Stadium
- Super League: 7th
- FA Cup: Round of 32
- Malaysia Cup: Group stage
- Top goalscorer: League: Paulo Rangel (9); All: Paulo Rangel (11)
Home colours	Away colours

The 2013 season was Perak's tenth consecutive season in the Malaysian Super League.

== Players ==
=== First team squad ===
As of 9 January 2013

Note: Flags indicate national team as defined under FIFA eligibility rules; some limited exceptions apply. Players may hold more than one non-FIFA nationality.

No.	Pos.	Nation	Player
1	GK	MAS	Jibrail Kamaron Baharin
2	DF	MAS	Haizal Faquan
3	MF	MAS	M. Yoganathan
4	MF	MAS	Nasir Basharudin
5	DF	MAS	Shahrom Kalam
6	DF	MAS	Syazwan Roslan
7	FW	MAS	Azlan Ismail
8	MF	MAS	Shahrulnizam Mustapa (captain)
10	FW	BRA	Paulo Rangel (on loan from Muangthong United)
11	DF	MAS	Khairi Kiman
12	FW	MAS	Failee Ghazli
13	DF	BRA	Rafael
14	FW	MAS	Hadi Yahya

No.	Pos.	Nation	Player
15	MF	MAS	Yong Kuong Yong
17	DF	MAS	Thirumurugan Veeran
18	MF	MAS	M. Sivakumar
19	DF	MAS	Hazrul Mustafa
20	MF	MAS	Rafiuddin Rodin
21	MF	MAS	Nazri Kamal
22	GK	MAS	Khairul Amri
23	MF	MAS	S. Chanturu
24	DF	MAS	Hisyamudin Sha'ari
25	GK	MAS	Farizal Marlias
–	MF	MAS	D. Savrinaathan
–	FW	MAS	Khairul Asyraf

== Transfers ==
=== In ===
==== First transfer window ====
Pos	Player	Transferred From
GK	(Malaysia) Farizal Marlias	(Malaysia) Negeri Sembilan
DF	(Brazil) Rafael	(Thailand) Bangkok Glass
DF	(Malaysia) V. Thirumurugan	(Malaysia) Kedah
DF	(Malaysia) Khairi Kiman	(Malaysia) Johor FC
MF	(Malaysia) S. Chanturu	(Malaysia) Kelantan
MF	(Malaysia) Yong Kuong Yong	(Malaysia) Felda United
FW	(Malaysia) Azlan Ismail	(Malaysia) Kelantan
FW	(Malaysia) Abdul Hadi Yahya	(Malaysia) Terengganu
FW	(France) Karim Rouani	(Thailand) BEC Tero Sasana

=== Out ===
==== First transfer window ====
Pos	Player	Transferred To
GK	(Malaysia) Nasril Nourdin	(Malaysia) Pahang
GK	(Malaysia) Kamarul Effandi	(Malaysia) Sime Darby
DF	(Malaysia) Chan Wing Hoong	Unattached
DF	(Malaysia) Khairi Zainudin	(Malaysia) Sime Darby
MF	(Slovakia) Michal Kubala	(Malaysia) Selangor
MF	(Malaysia) K. Nanthakumar	(Malaysia) Kelantan
MF	(Malaysia) Isma Alif	(Malaysia) T-Team
MF	(Malaysia) Fazrul Hazli	(Malaysia) Sime Darby
MF	(Malaysia) Fahrul Razi Kamaruddin	(Malaysia) Sime Darby
MF	(Malaysia) Badrul Azam	Unattached
MF	(Malaysia) Khalis Ibrahim	Unattached
MF	(Malaysia) Wan Hossen	(Malaysia) Kedah
FW	(Malaysia) Akmal Rizal	(Malaysia) Kedah
FW	(Malaysia) Shafiq Jamal	(Malaysia) Sime Darby
FW	(Cameroon) Albert Bodjongo	(Algeria) JS Kabylie

==== Second transfer window ====
Pos	Player	Transferred To
FW	(France) Karim Rouani	(Germany) Stuttgarter Kickers

=== Loan in ===
==== Second transfer window ====
Pos	Player	Loaned From
FW	(Brazil) Paulo Rangel	(Thailand) Muangthong United

== Competitions ==
=== Super League ===
Pos	Team	Pld	W	D	L	GF	GA	GD	Pts
5	Pahang	22	10	5	7	36	32	+4	35
6	ATM	22	10	4	8	35	25	+10	34
7	Perak	22	8	5	9	23	27	−4	29
8	PKNS	22	8	4	10	34	34	0	28
9	Terengganu	22	7	6	9	25	31	−6	27

Source: RSSSF
Rules for classification: 1) points; 2) goal difference; 3) number of goals scored

=== FA Cup ===
Win Draw Loss

The draw was held at Wisma FAM on 10 December 2012.

25 January 2013 Round of 32	Johor Darul Ta'zim	1–0	Perak	Johor Bahru, Johor
20:45 UTC+08:00	Aidil 59'			Stadium: Tan Sri Dato Hj Hassan Yunos Stadium; Referee: Nagor Amir Noor Mohamed

=== Malaysia Cup ===
==== Group stage ====
Team	Pld	W	D	L	GF	GA	GD	Pts
Sarawak FA (A)	6	3	1	2	13	5	+8	10
(Singapore) LionsXII (A)	6	3	1	2	9	7	+2	10
Perak FA	6	2	1	3	6	11	−5	7
Kedah FA	6	1	3	2	5	10	−5	6

(A) Advance to the 2013 Piala Malaysia quarter finals

Win Draw Loss

The matchdays were 20–31 August, and 17–21 September 2013.

20 August 2013 1	Perak	2–1	Sarawak	Ipoh, Perak
20:45	Rangel 65', 90'		Joseph Kalang 31'	Stadium: Perak Stadium; Attendance: 10,000; Referee: Zamzaidi Katimin

24 August 2013 2	Kedah	1–1	Perak	Alor Setar, Kedah
20:45	Alen Guć 90+2' (pen.)		Khairul Asyraf 59'	Stadium: Darul Aman Stadium; Attendance: 21,000; Referee: Muhd Nazmi Nasaruddin

27 August 2013 3	Perak	1–0	LionsXII	Ipoh, Perak
20:45	Azlan 9'			Stadium: Perak Stadium; Attendance: 20,000; Referee: Suhaizi Shukri

31 August 2013 4	LionsXII	2–1	Perak	Kallang, Singapore
19:45	Hariss 62'; Safuwan 85'		Hazrul 66'	Stadium: Jalan Besar Stadium; Attendance: 7,016; Referee: Mohd Nafeez Abdul Wahab

17 September 2013 5	Perak	0–1	Kedah	Ipoh, Perak
20:45			Nelson 90+2'	Stadium: Perak Stadium; Attendance: 30,000; Referee: Wan Mohd Tarmizi Wan Ibrahim

21 September 2013 6	Sarawak	6–1	Perak	Kuching, Sarawak
20:45	Khairi Kiman 7' (o.g.); Bobby 8'; Salibašić 45', 60', 74'; Zamri 58'		Yong 24'	Stadium: Sarawak State Stadium; Attendance: 20,000; Referee: Samsudin Ibrahim

== Statistics ==
=== Top scorers ===
The list is sorted by shirt number when total goals are equal.

Rnk	Pos	No.	Player	Super League	FA Cup	Malaysia Cup	Total
1	FW	10	(Brazil) Paulo Rangel	9	0	2	11
2	FW	7	(Malaysia) Azlan Ismail	3	0	1	4
3	FW	14	(Malaysia) Abdul Hadi Yahya	3	0	0	3
4	DF	19	(Malaysia) Hazrul Mustafa	1	0	1	2
4	MF	20	(Malaysia) Rafiuddin Rodin	2	0	0	2
6	FW		(Malaysia) Khairul Asyraf	0	0	1	1
6	MF	15	(Malaysia) Yong Kuong Yong	0	0	1	1
6	FW	12	(Malaysia) Failee Ghazli	1	0	0	1
6	FW	10	(France) Karim Rouani	1	0	0	1
6	DF	5	(Malaysia) Shahrom Kalam	1	0	0	1
#	Own goals			2	0	0	1
Total				23	0	6	29

Updated to match played 21 September 2013
