= 2014 Perak FA season =

Perak
2014 season
- President: Zainol Fadzi Paharudin
- Manager: Azhar Ahmad
- Head Coach: Abu Bakar Fadzim
- Stadium: Perak Stadium
- Super League: 9th
- FA Cup: Round of 32
- Malaysia Cup: Group stage
- Top goalscorer: League: Milan Purovic; Abdulafees (5); All: Milan Purovic; Abdulafees (6)
Home colours	Away colours	Third colours

The 2014 season was Perak's 11th consecutive season in the Malaysian Super League.

== Players ==
=== First team squad ===
As of 1 January 2014

No.	Name	Nationality	Position
Goalkeepers
1	Haziq Aris	(Malaysia)	GK
22	Razi Effendi Suhit	(Malaysia)	GK
Defenders
2	Haizal Faquan	(Malaysia)	LB
5	Syahmil Khairi	(Malaysia)	CB
6	Syazwan Roslan	(Malaysia)	CB, RB
12	Fazli Zulkifli	(Malaysia)	CB
14	Norhizwan Hassan	(Malaysia)	LB
17	Tuah Iskandar	(Malaysia)	RB
19	Noor Hazrul Mustafa	(Malaysia)	RB, LB
24	Hisyamudin Sha'ari	(Malaysia)	CB
25	Azmeer Yusof	(Malaysia)	CB, LB
23	**Martin Kofando**	(Burkina Faso)	CB
26	Khairi Kiman	(Malaysia)	LB
27	Raffi Nagoorgani ^{PC}	(Malaysia)	LB, CB
42	Hassan Daher	(Lebanon)	CB
Midfielders
3	Yoganathan a/l Munusamy	(Malaysia)	CM
4	Nasir Basharudin (vice-captain)	(Malaysia)	CM
7	**Kyaw Zayar Win**	(Myanmar)	AM
10	Hardi Jaafar (captain)	(Malaysia)	CM
11	Ridzuan Azly Hussham	(Malaysia)	RW
13	Sukri Abdul Hamid	(Malaysia)	CM
15	Idris Ahmad	(Malaysia)	CM
16	Partiban a/l K. Janasekaran	(Malaysia)	LW
18	Nazri Kamal	(Malaysia)	CM, RW
21	Hidayat Amaruddin	(Malaysia)	LW, RW
35	Norhakim Isa	(Malaysia)	CM
43	Marco Tulio	(Brazil)	LW, RW
–	Hafiz Ramdan	(Malaysia)	AM
Forwards
8	Shahrizal Saad	(Malaysia)	ST
9	**Eliel Da Cruz Guardiano**	(Brazil)	ST
10	**Želimir Terkeš**	(Bosnia and Herzegovina)	ST
28	Khairul Asyraf Sahizah ^{PC}	(Malaysia)	ST
49	Milan Purovic	(Montenegro)	ST
50	Abdulafees Abdulsalam	(Nigeria)	ST

- **PC** = President Cup player
- Player names in **bold** denotes player that left mid-season

== Competitions ==
=== Super League ===
==== League table ====
Pos	Team	Pld	W	D	L	GF	GA	GD	Pts	Qualification or relegation
7	Sarawak	22	9	3	10	26	31	−5	30	
8	LionsXII (Note: LionsXII are not eligible for any AFC competition spots)	22	8	4	10	26	27	−1	28	
9	Perak	22	8	2	12	22	27	−5	26	
10	ATM	22	6	6	10	29	34	−5	24	
11	T–Team	22	6	6	10	21	28	−7	24	Relegation to 2015 Liga Premier

Source: RSSSF, FAM Official Site, Astro Arena
Rules for classification: 1) points; 2) goal difference; 3) number of goals scored

=== FA Cup ===
Win Draw Loss

21 January 2014 Round of 32	Perak	2–2 (a.e.t.) (4–5 p)	Pahang	Ipoh, Perak
20:45 UTC+08:00	Hardi Jaafar 12'; Zayar Win 45'		Azamuddin Akil 8'; Damion Stewart 57'	Stadium: Perak Stadium; Referee: Mohd Yusof Mat Karim (Tentera)
	Penalties
	Terkeš (penalty scored); Hazrul (penalty missed); Azmeer (penalty missed); Eliel (penalty scored); Zayar Win (penalty scored); Hisyamudin (penalty scored); Syahmil (penalty missed)		Conti (penalty scored); Faizol (penalty missed); Razman (penalty scored); Zesh (penalty scored); Azamuddin (penalty missed); Fauzi (penalty scored); Saiful (penalty scored)

=== Malaysia Cup ===
==== Group stage ====
Team	Pld	W	D	L	GF	GA	GD	Pts
Kedah (A)	6	3	1	2	11	9	+2	10
Terengganu (A)	6	2	3	1	10	9	+1	9
Perak	6	2	2	2	7	7	0	8
Sarawak	6	1	2	3	6	9	−3	5

(A) Advanced to the 2014 Piala Malaysia quarter finals

Win Draw Loss

14 August 2014 1	Perak	2–1	Kedah	Ipoh, Perak
20:45	Purović 10'; Hafiz Ramdan 52'	Report	Mehmet 44'	Stadium: Perak Stadium; Attendance: 6,000; Referee: Syed Azhar Syed Kamar

20 August 2014 2	Perak	2–0	Sarawak	Ipoh, Perak
20:45	Nasir 45'; Abdulafees 49'			Stadium: Perak Stadium; Attendance: 7,000; Referee: Zamzaidi Katimin

23 August 2014 3	Terengganu	2–1	Perak	Kuala Terengganu, Terengganu
20:45	Manaf 30'; Nor Farhan 50'		Nazri 32'	Stadium: Sultan Ismail Nasiruddin Shah Stadium; Attendance: 7,000; Referee: Teoh Hee Loon

27 August 2014 4	Perak	1–1	Terengganu	Perak Stadium, Ipoh
20:45	Bikana 47' (o.g.)		Nordin 88'	Attendance: 10,000; Referee: Muhd Nazmi Nasaruddin

30 August 2014 5	Sarawak	1–1	Perak	Sarawak State Stadium, Kuching
20:45	Hairol 60'		Tulio 77'	Attendance: 5,000; Referee: Nafeez Abd Wahab

3 September 2014 6	Kedah	2–0	Perak	Darul Aman Stadium, Alor Star
20:45	Mehmet 72'; Baddrol 76'			Attendance: 15,000; Referee: Zamzaidi Katimin

== Statistics ==
=== Top scorers ===
The list is sorted by shirt number when total goals are equal.

Rnk	Pos	No.	Player	Super League	FA Cup	Malaysia Cup	Total
1	FW	50	(Nigeria) Abdulafees Abdulsalam	5	0	1	6
1	FW	49	(Montenegro) Milan Purović	5	0	1	6
3	MF	43	(Brazil) Marco Tulio	3	0	1	4
4	MF	35	(Malaysia) Norhakim Isa	3	0	0	3
5	FW	9	(Brazil) Eliel Da Cruz	2	0	0	2
6	DF	42	(Lebanon) Hassan Daher	1	0	0	1
6	MF	16	(Malaysia) J. Partiban	1	0	0	1
6	FW	28	(Malaysia) Khairul Asyraf	1	0	0	1
6	MF	13	(Malaysia) Sukri Hamid	1	0	0	1
6	MF	7	(Myanmar) Kyaw Zayar Win	0	1	0	1
6	DF	10	(Malaysia) Hardi Jaafar	0	1	0	1
6	MF	–	(Malaysia) Hafiz Ramdan	0	0	1	1
6	MF	4	(Malaysia) Nasir Basharudin	0	0	1	1
6	MF	18	(Malaysia) Nazri Kamal	0	0	1	1
#	Own goals			0	0	1	1
Total				22	2	7	31

Updated to match played 9 September 2016

== Transfers ==
Second transfer window started on 8 April until 22 April.

=== In ===
==== First transfer window ====
Pos	Player	Transferred From
GK	(Malaysia) Haziq Aris	(Malaysia) UiTM
GK	(Malaysia) Razi Effendi Suhit	(Malaysia) PKNS
DF	(Burkina Faso) Martin Kafando	(Burkina Faso) Forces Armées
DF	(Malaysia) Azmeer Yusof	(Malaysia) Negeri Sembilan
DF	(Malaysia) Tuah Iskandar	(Malaysia) Johor Darul Ta'zim
DF	(Malaysia) Fazli Zulkifli	(Malaysia) Felda United
DF	(Malaysia) Idris Ahmad	(Malaysia) PDRM
DF	(Malaysia) Norhizwan Hassan	(Malaysia) UiTM
DF	(Malaysia) Syahmil Khairi	(Malaysia) Perak youth
MF	(Myanmar) Kyaw Zayar Win	(Myanmar) Kanbawza
MF	(Malaysia) Hardi Jaafar	(Malaysia) Penang
MF	(Malaysia) Hidayat Amaruddin	(Malaysia) UiTM
MF	(Malaysia) Partiban a/l K. Janasekaran	(Malaysia) Perak youth
MF	(Malaysia) Ridzuan Azly Hussham	(Malaysia) Perak youth
MF	(Malaysia) Sukri Abdul Hamid	(Malaysia) Perak youth
ST	(Malaysia) Shahrizal Saad	(Malaysia) Felda United
ST	(Bosnia and Herzegovina) Želimir Terkeš	(Croatia) NK Zadar
ST	(Brazil) Eliel da Cruz Guardiano	(Brazil) Cruzeiro

==== Second transfer window ====
Pos	Player	Transferred From
DF	(Lebanon) Hassan Daher	(Lebanon) Al-Ahed
MF	(Brazil) Marco Tulio	(Malta) Tarxien Rainbows
ST	(Montenegro) Milan Purović	(Serbia) Bežanija
ST	(Nigeria) Abdulafees Abdulsalam	(Qatar) Al-Shamal

=== Out ===
==== First transfer window ====
Pos	Player	Transferred To
GK	(Malaysia) Farizal Marlias	(Malaysia) Selangor
GK	(Malaysia) Khairul Amri	(Malaysia) Penang
DF	(Malaysia) V. Thirumurugan	(Malaysia) PDRM
DF	(Malaysia) Shahrom Kalam	(Malaysia) Selangor
DF	(Brazil) Rafael Souza Silva Novais	(Malaysia) PDRM
MF	(Malaysia) Muhd Rafiuddin Rodin	(Malaysia) Penang
MF	(Malaysia) Yong Kuong Yong	(Malaysia) Penang
MF	(Malaysia) S. Chanturu	(Malaysia) Sarawak
MF	(Malaysia) Shahrulnizam Mustapa	(Malaysia) Felda United
ST	(Malaysia) Abdul Hadi Yahya	(Malaysia) Selangor
ST	(Brazil) Paulo Rangel	(Malaysia) Selangor
HC	(Malaysia) Azraai Khor Abdullah	(Malaysia) T-Team

==== Second transfer window ====
Pos	Player	Transferred To
DF	(Burkina Faso) Martin Kafando	Released
MF	(Myanmar) Kyaw Zayar Win	(Myanmar) Kanbawza
ST	(Brazil) Eliel Da Cruz Guardiano	(Bahrain) Busaiteen
ST	(Bosnia and Herzegovina) Želimir Terkeš	(Indonesia) Persija Jakarta
