= 2011 Malaysia Cup =

Piala Malaysia

Tournament details
- Country: Malaysia
- Teams: 16

Final positions
- Champions: Negeri Sembilan FA (2nd title)
- Runners-up: Terengganu FA

Tournament statistics
- Matches played: 61
- Top goal scorer: 8 goals Hairuddin Omar (Negeri Sembilan FA)

Awards
- Best player: Hairuddin Omar

The 2011 Malaysia Cup (Malay: Piala Malaysia 2011) was the 85th edition of the Malaysia Cup. The soccer competition began on 6 September 2011 and concluded on 29 October 2011 with the final held at Shah Alam Stadium, Shah Alam. A total of 16 teams took part in the competition. The teams were divided into 4 groups of 4 teams, with the group leaders and runners-up after 6 matches qualifying through to the quarterfinals.

== Format ==
In this competition, the top 12 teams from Malaysian Super League joined the four teams from Malaysian Premier League. The teams were drawn into four groups of four teams, at the Stadium Bukit Jalil on 5 August 2011.

Due to the withdrawal of Harimau Muda A, the second bottom team in the 2011 Malaysian Super League and the 5th placed team in the 2011 Malaysia Premier League will compete with each other to take Harimau Muda A spot in the 2011 Malaysia Cup.

Pahang FA and Sime Darby FC will play a two legged match to take a place in the 2011 Malaysia Cup replacing Harimau Muda A

The matches will take place from 6 September 2011 to 29 October 2011. The top two teams in each group will progress to the quarterfinals.

== Play Off ==
In the 2011 Malaysia Cup Play off, Pahang FA and Sime Darby FC will play a two legged match to take a place in the 2011 Malaysia Cup replacing Harimau Muda A.

19 July 2011

| Sime Darby FC (Kuala Lumpur) | 4–0 | Pahang FA |
|---|---|---|
| Faizal Esahar 46'; Nor Ismail 62'; Yusri Abbas 80'; Badrul Hisyam 91' |

Majlis Perbandaran Selayang Stadium, Selangor
Attendance: 600

22 July 2011

| Pahang FA | 0–2 | (Kuala Lumpur) Sime Darby FC |
|---|---|---|
| | | Faizal Esahar 46'; Faizal Mansor 80' |

Darulmakmur Stadium, Pahang
Attendance: 3,000

Sime Darby FC won 6–0 on aggregate and advanced to the group stage.

== Seeding ==
The 16 teams were divided into four pots for the draw, each containing four teams. The standings in Super League and Premier League 2011 ended on 9 June 2011 – was used to seed the teams.

| Pot 1 | Pot 2 | Pot 3 | Pot 4 |
|---|---|---|---|
| Kelantan FA; Terengganu FA; Selangor FA; Kedah FA | Perak FA; Johor FC; Negeri Sembilan FA (Terengganu) T-Team FC | Sabah FA; Felda United FC; Kuala Lumpur FA (Selangor) PKNS FC | Sarawak FA (Kuala Lumpur) PDRM FA; Johor FA (Kuala Lumpur) Sime Darby FC |

== Group stage ==
=== Group A ===
| Team | Pld | W | D | L | GF | GA | GD | Pts |
|---|---|---|---|---|---|---|---|---|
| Perak FA | 6 | 4 | 2 | 0 | 9 | 5 | +4 | 14 |
| Sabah FA | 6 | 3 | 1 | 2 | 10 | 6 | +4 | 10 |
| Kedah FA | 10 | 2 | 6 | 2 | 9 | 8 | +1 | 12 |
| Johor FA | 6 | 0 | 1 | 5 | 7 | 16 | −9 | 1 |

6 September 2011
20:45

| Johor FA | 0–2 | Kedah FA |
|---|---|---|
| | Report | Mohd Khyril Muhymeen Zambri 7', 80' |

Tan Sri Dato Hj Hassan Yunos Stadium, Johor Bahru
Attendance: 10,000
6 September 2011
20:15

| Sabah FA | 0–0 | Perak FA |
|---|---|---|
| | Report |

Likas Stadium, Kota Kinabalu
Attendance: 3,400

10 September 2011
20:15

| Sabah FA | 2–1 | Kedah FA |
|---|---|---|
| Zainizam Marjan 27'; K.Thanaraj 77' | | Mohd Azmi Muslim 86' |

Likas Stadium, Kota Kinabalu
10 September 2011
20:45

| Perak FA | 2–1 | Johor FA |
|---|---|---|
| Mohd Failee Mohamad Ghazli 29'; Muhammad Shafiq Jamal 74' (pen.) | | Mohd Azuwad Mohd Arip 88' |

Perak Stadium, Ipoh
Referee: Zohri Tajudin

13 September 2011
20:45

| Perak FA | 2–1 | Kedah FA |
|---|---|---|
| Muhammad Shafiq Jamal 15'; Mohd Failee Mohamad Ghazli 36' | | Mohd Khyril Muhymeen Zambri 34' |

Perak Stadium, Ipoh
13 September 2011
20:15

| Sabah FA | 3–1 | Johor FA |
|---|---|---|
| Radzi Mohd Hussin 9'; Zainizam Marjan 35', 54' | Report | Mohd Azuwad Mohd Arip 20' |

Likas Stadium, Likas, Kota Kinabalu

17 September 2011
20:45

| Kedah FA | 3–3 | Johor FA |
|---|---|---|
| Mohd Khyril Muhymeen Zambri 28', 71'; Baddrol Bakhtiar 83' (pen.) | | Mohd Noraslan Mokhtar 67'; Fauzie Nan (69 own goal); Mohd Arshadi Yusof 72' |

Darul Aman Stadium, Alor Setar
17 September 2011
20:45

| Perak FA | 2–1 | Sabah FA |
|---|---|---|
| Mohd Fazrul Hazli Mohd Kadri 4'; Mohd Failee Mohamad Ghazli 46' (pen.) | | Shahrul Azhar Ture 8' |

Perak Stadium, Ipoh

24 September 2011
20:45

| Kedah FA | 1–0 | Sabah FA |
|---|---|---|
| Mohd Khyril Muhymeen Zambri 44' | Report |

Darul Aman Stadium, Alor Setar
24 September 2011
20:45

| Johor FA | 1–2 | Perak FA |
|---|---|---|
| Mohd Arshadi Yusof 90+4' | Report | Muhammad Shafiq Jamal 38'; Mohd Failee Mohamad Ghazli 90' |

Tan Sri Dato Hj Hassan Yunos Stadium, Larkin, Johor Bahru

27 September 2011
20:45

| Kedah FA | 1–1 | Perak FA |
|---|---|---|
| Mohd Faizal Abu Bakar 56' | Report | Muhammad Shafiq Jamal 53' |

Darul Aman Stadium, Alor Setar
27 September 2011
20:45

| Johor FA | 1–4 | Sabah FA |
|---|---|---|
| Mohd Redzuan Nawi 54' | Report | Razlan Oto 31'; Rozaimi Abdul Rahman 60'; Radzi Mohd Hussin 66'; Mohd Farid Ideris 78' |

Tan Sri Dato Hj Hassan Yunos Stadium, Larkin, Johor Bahru

=== Group B ===
| Team | Pld | W | D | L | GF | GA | GD | Pts |
|---|---|---|---|---|---|---|---|---|
| Negeri Sembilan FA | 6 | 4 | 1 | 1 | 10 | 4 | +6 | 13 |
| Terengganu FA | 6 | 4 | 1 | 1 | 8 | 3 | +5 | 13 |
| (Selangor) PKNS FC | 6 | 3 | 0 | 3 | 7 | 6 | +1 | 9 |
| (Kuala Lumpur) Sime Darby FC | 6 | 0 | 0 | 6 | 1 | 13 | −12 | 0 |

6 September 2011
20:45

| Sime Darby FC (Kuala Lumpur) | 0–3 | Terengganu FA |
|---|---|---|
| | Report | Joseph Kalang Tie 6'; Reeshafiq Alwi 32'; Abdul Manaf Mamat 85' |

Majlis Perbandaran Selayang Stadium, Selayang
Attendance: 5,600
6 September 2011
20:45

| PKNS FC (Selangor) | 1–2 | Negeri Sembilan FA |
|---|---|---|
| Norhafizzuan Jailani 8' | Report | Hairuddin Omar 15'; Shahurain Abu Samah 44' |

MBPJ Stadium, Petaling Jaya
Attendance: 600

10 September 2011
20:45

| Terengganu FA | 3–2 | (Selangor) PKNS FC |
|---|---|---|
| Mohd Ashaari Shamsuddin 1'; Reeshafiq Alwi 54'; Abdul Manaf Mamat 79' (pen.) | Report | Mohd Fauzan Dzulkifli 9'; Mohammad Zamri Hassan 62' |

Sultan Ismail Nasiruddin Shah Stadium, Kuala Terengganu
10 September 2011
20:45

| Negeri Sembilan FA | 5–0 | (Kuala Lumpur) Sime Darby FC |
|---|---|---|
| Hairuddin Omar 33', 72'; Shahurain Abu Samah 36'; Muhammad Shukor Adan 64'; Mohd Firdaus Azizul 79' | Report |

Tuanku Abdul Rahman Stadium, Paroi, Seremban

13 September 2011
20:45

| Negeri Sembilan FA | 1–0 | Terengganu FA |
|---|---|---|
| Shahurain Abu Samah 65' | Report |

Tuanku Abdul Rahman Stadium, Paroi. Seremban
13 September 2011
20:45

| PKNS FC (Selangor) | 1–0 | (Kuala Lumpur) Sime Darby FC |
|---|---|---|
| P. Rajesh 9' | Report |

MBPJ Stadium, Kelana Jaya

17 September 2011
20:45

| Terengganu FA | 1–0 | (Kuala Lumpur) Sime Darby FC |
|---|---|---|
| Mohd Ashaari Shamsuddin 33' | Report |

Sultan Ismail Nasiruddin Shah Stadium, Kuala Terengganu
17 September 2011
20:45

| Negeri Sembilan FA | 0–2 | (Selangor) PKNS FC |
|---|---|---|
| | Report | Mohd Fauzan Dzulkifli 48'; Mohamad Norhisham Hassan 58' |

Tuanku Abdul Rahman Stadium, Paroi, Seremban

24 September 2011
20:45

| PKNS FC (Selangor) | 0–1 | Terengganu FA |
|---|---|---|
| | Report | Ismail Faruqi Asha'ri 14' |

MBPJ Stadium, Kelana Jaya
24 September 2011
20:45

| Sime Darby FC (Kuala Lumpur) | 1–2 | Negeri Sembilan FA |
|---|---|---|
| Mohd Raimi Mohd Nor 14' | Report | Mohd Firdaus Azizul 13'; Shahurain Abu Samah 83' |

MPS Stadium, Selayang

27 September 2011
20:45

| Terengganu FA | 0–0 | Negeri Sembilan FA |
|---|---|---|
| | Report |

Sultan Ismail Nasiruddin Shah Stadium, Kuala Terengganu
27 September 2011
20:45

| Sime Darby FC (Kuala Lumpur) | 0–1 | (Selangor) PKNS FC |
|---|---|---|
| | Report | Mohd Fauzan Dzulkifli 75' |

MPS Stadium, Selayang

=== Group C ===
| Team | Pld | W | D | L | GF | GA | GD | Pts |
|---|---|---|---|---|---|---|---|---|
| Kelantan FA | 6 | 4 | 1 | 1 | 11 | 4 | +7 | 13 |
| (Kuala Lumpur) Felda United FC | 6 | 3 | 1 | 2 | 6 | 4 | +2 | 10 |
| Johor FC | 6 | 2 | 2 | 2 | 7 | 1 | +6 | 8 |
| Sarawak FA | 6 | 1 | 0 | 5 | 2 | 11 | −9 | 3 |

6 September 2011
20:15

| Sarawak FA | 0–2 | Kelantan FA |
|---|---|---|
| | Report | Norshahrul Idlan Talaha 64'; S. Chanturu 85' |

Sarawak Stadium, Kuching
Attendance: 20,000
6 September 2011
20:45

| Johor FC | 0–2 | (Kuala Lumpur) Felda United FC |
|---|---|---|
| | Report | Farderin Kadir 44', 68' |

Pasir Gudang Corporation Stadium, Pasir Gudang
Attendance: 6,700

10 September 2011
20:45

| Kelantan FA | 2–1 | Johor FC |
|---|---|---|
| Mohd Shakir Shaari 26'; Mohd Ramzul Zahini Adnan 88' | Report | Eddy Helmi Abdul Manan 11' |

Sultan Mohammad IV Stadium, Kota Bharu
10 September 2011
20:45

| Felda United FC (Kuala Lumpur) | 1–0 | Sarawak FA |
|---|---|---|
| Mohd Nizam Abu Bakar 68' | Report |

MBPJ Stadium, Kelana Jaya

13 September 2011
20:15

| Sarawak FA | 0–1 | Johor FC |
|---|---|---|
| | Report | Eddy Helmi Abdul Manan 48' (pen.) |

Sarawak Stadium, Petra Jaya, Kuching

14 September 2011
20:45

| Felda United FC (Kuala Lumpur) | 2–0 | Kelantan FA |
|---|---|---|
| Farderin Kadir 27'; D. Saarvindran 67' | Report |

MPS Stadium, Selayang

18 September 2011
20:45

| Kelantan FA | 4–0 | Sarawak FA |
|---|---|---|
| Mohd Badri Mohd Radzi 80', 90'; Norshahrul Idlan Talaha 87'; Danial Fadzly Abdullah 88' | Report |

Sultan Mohammad IV Stadium, Kota Bharu
18 September 2011
20:45

| Felda United FC (Kuala Lumpur) | 1–1 | Johor FC |
|---|---|---|
| Mohd Azrul Ahmad 67' | Report | Mohd Izuan Jarudin 38' |

MBPJ Stadium, Kelana Jaya

24 September 2011
20:45

| Johor FC | 1–1 | Kelantan FA |
|---|---|---|
| Mohd Akhmal Mohd Noor 2' | Report | Mohd Azamuddin Md Akil 8' |

JCorp Stadium, Pasir Gudang
24 September 2011
20:15

| Sarawak FA | 1–0 | (Kuala Lumpur) Felda United FC |
|---|---|---|
| Bobby Gonzales 17' | Report |

State Stadium, Petra Jaya, Kuching

27 September 2011
20:45

| Kelantan FA | 2–0 | (Kuala Lumpur) Felda United FC |
|---|---|---|
| Norshahrul Idlan Talaha 62', 71' | Report |

Sultan Mohammad IV Stadium, Kota Bharu
27 September 2011
20:45

| Johor FC | 3–1 | Sarawak FA |
|---|---|---|
| Mohd Akhmal Mohd Nor 62', 71'; Mohd Ridwan M'aon 71' | Report | Bobby Gonzales (pen.) |

JCorp Stadium, Pasir Gudang, Johor Bahru

=== Group D ===
| Team | Pld | W | D | L | GF | GA | GD | Pts |
|---|---|---|---|---|---|---|---|---|
| (Terengganu) PBDKT T-Team FC | 6 | 4 | 1 | 1 | 15 | 4 | +11 | 13 |
| Selangor FA | 6 | 3 | 1 | 2 | 9 | 5 | +4 | 10 |
| Kuala Lumpur FA | 6 | 2 | 3 | 1 | 7 | 4 | +3 | 9 |
| (Kuala Lumpur) PDRM FA | 6 | 0 | 1 | 5 | 1 | 19 | −18 | 1 |

6 September 2011
20:45

| PBDKT T-Team FC (Terengganu) | 1–0 | Selangor FA |
|---|---|---|
| Norfadzly Alias 73' | Report |

Sultan Ismail Nasiruddin Shah Stadium, Kuala Terengganu
Attendance: 8,000
6 September 2011
20:45

| PDRM FA (Kuala Lumpur) | 0–3 | Kuala Lumpur FA |
|---|---|---|
| | Report | Azrul Azman 44'; Badrul Hisyam Azmi 64' (pen.); Yong Kuong Yong 76' |

Tuanku Abdul Rahman Stadium, Paroi
Attendance: 4,800

10 September 2011
20:45

| Selangor FA | 2–0 | (Kuala Lumpur) PDRM FA |
|---|---|---|
| Mohd Fadzli Saari 46', 59' | Report |

Shah Alam Stadium, Shah Alam
10 September 2011
20:45

| Kuala Lumpur FA | 2–1 | (Terengganu) PBDKT T-Team FC |
|---|---|---|
| Yong Kuong Yong 28', 47' | Report | Norfadzly Alias 46' |

MPS Stadium, Selayang

13 September 2011
20:45

| Kuala Lumpur FA | 0–0 | Selangor FA |
|---|---|---|
| | Report |

MPS Stadium, Selayang
13 September 2011
20:45

| PBDKT T-Team FC (Terengganu) | 4–0 | (Kuala Lumpur) PDRM FA |
|---|---|---|
| Zairo Anuar Zalani 43'; Norfadzly Alias 45'; Mohd Fitri Omar 65'; Mohd Nor Farhan Muhammad 78' | Report |

Sultan Ismail Nasiruddin Shah Stadium, Kuala Terengganu

17 September 2011
20:45

| Selangor FA | 1–2 | (Terengganu) PBDKT T-Team FC |
|---|---|---|
| Mohd Amri Yahyah 14' | Report | Mohd Nor Farhan Muhammad 81'; Zairo Anuar Zalani 87' |

Shah Alam Stadium, Shah Alam
17 September 2011
20:45

| Kuala Lumpur FA | 0–0 | (Kuala Lumpur) PDRM FA |
|---|---|---|
| | Report |

MPS Stadium, Selayang

24 September 2011
20:45

| PDRM FA (Kuala Lumpur) | 1–4 | Selangor FA |
|---|---|---|
| Mohd Fauzi Abdul Majid 62' | Report | Mohd Amri Yahyah 31'; Mohd Safiq Rahim 44'; Mohd Amirul Hadi Zainal 71'; Rudie Ramli 89' |

Tuanku Abdul Rahman Stadium, Paroi, Seremban
24 September 2011
20:45

| PBDKT T-Team FC (Terengganu) | 1–1 | Kuala Lumpur FA |
|---|---|---|
| Indra Putra Mahayuddin 28' | Report | Ahmad Hazwan Bakri 46' |

Sultan Ismail Nasiruddin Shah Stadium, Kuala Terengganu

27 September 2011
20:45

| Selangor FA | 2–1 | Kuala Lumpur FA |
|---|---|---|
| Mohd Razman Roslan 65'; Mohd Amri Yahyah 75' | Report | Shahrom Kalam 37' |

Shah Alam Stadium, Shah Alam
27 September 2011
20:45

| PDRM FA (Kuala Lumpur) | 0–6 | (Terengganu) PBDKT T-Team FC |
|---|---|---|
| | Report | Indra Putra Mahayuddin 17'; Zairo Anuar Zailani 38'; Mohd Nor Farhan Muhammad 52'; Badrul Hisani Abdul Rahman 78'; Norfadzly Alias 81'; Shamsul Kamal Mohamad 87' |

Tuanku Abdul Rahman Stadium, Paroi, Seremban

== Knockout stage ==
=== Bracket ===
Quarterfinals
D2 | Selangor FA | 3 | 1 | 4
A1 | Perak FA | 1 | 0 | 1
B2 | Terengganu FA | 3 | 2 | 5
C1 | Kelantan FA | 1 | 2 | 3
C2 | (Kuala Lumpur) Felda United FC | 1 | 0 | 1
B1 | Negeri Sembilan | 0 | 3 | 3
A2 | Sabah FA | 1 | 1 | 2
D1 | (Terengganu) T-Team FC | 2 | 2 | 4

Semifinals
D2 | Selangor FA | 0 | 1 | 1
B2 | Terengganu FA | 2 | 2 | 4
B1 | Negeri Sembilan | 4 | 2 | 6
D1 | (Terengganu) T-Team FC | 2 | 1 | 3

Final
B2 | Terengganu FA | 1
B1 | Negeri Sembilan | 2

=== Quarterfinals ===
==== First leg ====
10 October 2011
20:45

| Selangor FA | 3 – 1 | Perak FA |
|---|---|---|
| Mohd Safiq Rahim 13', 58'; Mohd Amirul Hadi Zainal 63' | Report | Mohd Failee Mohamad Ghazli 76' |

Shah Alam Stadium, Shah Alam

10 October 2011
20:45

| Felda United FC (Kuala Lumpur) | 1 – 0 | Negeri Sembilan FA |
|---|---|---|
| Koran Rajan 58' | Report |

MBPJ Stadium, Kelana Jaya

10 October 2011
20:45

| Terengganu FA | 3 – 1 | Kelantan FA |
|---|---|---|
| Ismail Faruqi Asha'ri 45'; Abdul Manaf Mamat 89'; Mohd Marzuki Yusof 90' | Report | Mohd Badri Mohd Radzi 80' (pen.) |

Sultan Ismail Nasiruddin Shah Stadium, Kuala Terengganu
Referee: Nafeez Abd. Wahab (Johor)

10 October 2011
20:15

| Sabah FA | 1 – 2 | (Terengganu) PBDKT T-Team FC |
|---|---|---|
| Alto Linus 46' | Report | Indra Putra Mahayuddin 35', 85' |

Likas Stadium, Likas, Kota Kinabalu

==== Second leg ====
14 October 2011
20:45

| Perak FA | 0 – 1 | Selangor FA |
|---|---|---|
| | Report | Rudie Ramli 49' |

Perak Stadium, Ipoh
Referee: Zamzaidi Katimin (Melaka)

Selangor FA won 4–1 on aggregate and advanced to the semi-finals against Terengganu FA.

14 October 2011
20:45

| Negeri Sembilan FA | 3 – 0 (a.e.t.) | (Kuala Lumpur) Felda United FC |
|---|---|---|
| Hairuddin Omar 17', 110'; Idris Abdul Karim 100' | Report |

Tuanku Abdul Rahman Stadium, Paroi, Seremban

Negeri Sembilan FA won 3–1 on aggregate after extra time and advanced to the semi-finals against PBDKT T-Team FC.

14 October 2011
20:45

| Kelantan FA | 2 – 2 | Terengganu FA |
|---|---|---|
| Mohd Azamuddin Md Akil 55'; Mohd Badri Mohd Radzi 70' (pen.) | Report | Mohd Ashaari Shamsuddin 19', 40' |

Sultan Mohammad IV Stadium, Kota Bharu

Terengganu FA won 5–3 on aggregate and advanced to the semi-finals against Selangor FA.

14 October 2011
20:45

| PBDKT T-Team FC (Terengganu) | 2 – 1 | Sabah FA |
|---|---|---|
| Mohd Fitri Omar 30'; Zairo Anuar Zalani 63' | Report | Mafry Balang 87' |

Sultan Ismail Nasiruddin Shah Stadium, Kuala Terengganu

PBDKT T-Team FC won 4–2 on aggregate and advanced to the semi-finals against Negeri Sembilan FA.

=== Semi-finals ===
==== First leg ====
18 October 2011
20:45

| Selangor FA | 0 – 2 | Terengganu FA |
|---|---|---|
| | Report | Abdul Manaf Mamat 1', 32' |

Shah Alam Stadium, Shah Alam

18 October 2011
20:45

| PBDKT T-Team FC (Terengganu) | 2 – 4 | Negeri Sembilan FA |
|---|---|---|
| Indra Putra Mahayuddin 10'; Mohd Nor Farhan Muhammad 40' | Report | Shahurain Abu Samah 6'; Hairuddin Omar 26', 43'; S. Kunalan 50' |

Sultan Ismail Nasiruddin Shah Stadium, Kuala Terengganu
Referee: Suhaizi Shukri (Melaka)

==== Second leg ====
22 October 2011
20:45

| Terengganu FA | 2–1 | Selangor FA |
|---|---|---|
| Abdul Manaf Mamat 19'; Mohd Ashaari Shamsuddin 72' | Report | Mohd Safiq Rahim 87' |

Sultan Ismail Nasiruddin Shah Stadium, Kuala Terengganu
Referee: Mohd. Yusof Mat Karim (Tentera)

Terengganu FA won 4–1 on aggregate and advanced to the finals against Negeri Sembilan FA.

22 October 2011
20:45

| Negeri Sembilan FA | 2–1 | (Terengganu) PBDKT T-Team FC |
|---|---|---|
| Shahurain Abu Samah 73'; Muhammad Shukor Adan 84' | Report | Mohd Fitri Omar 72' |

Tuanku Abdul Rahman Stadium, Paroi
Attendance: 45 000
Referee: Nago Amir

Negeri Sembilan FA won 6–3 on aggregate and advanced to the finals against Terengganu FA.

== Final ==
The final was played at the Shah Alam Stadium, Selangor, on Saturday, 29 October 2011. The original venue was the National Stadium, Bukit Jalil, but the Football Association of Malaysia were forced to change the venue because the national stadium were undergoing repairs on the stadium's roof.

29 October 2011
20:45

| Terengganu FA | 1–2 | Negeri Sembilan FA |
|---|---|---|
| Mohd Ashaari Shamsuddin 59' | Report | S. Kunalan 81'; Hairuddin Omar 86' |

Shah Alam Stadium, Shah Alam, Selangor
Attendance: 60,000
Referee: Mohd Shokri Nor

== Winners ==
Malaysia Cup 2011 winner

3rd title

== Statistics ==
=== Top Scorer ===
| Rank | Player | Club | Goals |
|---|---|---|---|
| 1 | (Terengganu) Hairuddin Omar | Negeri Sembilan FA | 8 |
| 2 | (Kedah) Mohd Khyril Muhymeen Zambri | Kedah FA | 6 |
| 2 | (Terengganu) Mohd Ashaari Shamsuddin | Terengganu FA | 6 |
| 2 | (Terengganu) Abdul Manaf Mamat | Terengganu FA | 6 |
| 2 | (Selangor) Shahurain Abu Samah | Negeri Sembilan FA | 6 |
| 3 | (Penang) Mohd Failee Mohamad Ghazli | Perak FA | 5 |
| 3 | (Perak) Indra Putra Mahayuddin | (Terengganu) PBDKT T-Team FC | 5 |
| 4 | (Terengganu) Norshahrul Idlan Talaha | Kelantan FA | 4 |
| 4 | (Selangor) Mohd Safiq Rahim | Selangor FA | 4 |
| 4 | (Kelantan) Mohd Badri Mohd Radzi | Kelantan FA | 4 |
| 4 | (Terengganu) Norfadzly Alias | (Terengganu) PBDKT T-Team FC | 4 |
| 5 | (Kedah) Muhammad Shafiq Jamal | Perak FA | 3 |
| 5 | (Sabah) Zainizam Marjan | Sabah FA | 3 |
| 5 | (Selangor) Mohd Amri Yahyah | Selangor FA | 3 |
| 5 | (Terengganu) Mohd Nor Farhan Muhammad | (Terengganu) PBDKT T-Team FC | 3 |
