= 2011 Malaysia FA Cup =

Piala FA

Tournament details
- Country: Malaysia
- Teams: 30

Final positions
- Champions: Terengganu FA (2nd title)
- Runners-up: Kelantan FA

The 2011 Malaysia FA Cup, also known as the Astro Piala FA due to the competition's sponsorship by Astro Arena, was the 22nd season of the Malaysia FA Cup, a knockout competition for Malaysia's state football association and clubs.

Negeri Sembilan FA were the defending champions.

The cup winner were guaranteed a place in the 2012 AFC Cup.

== Format ==
The Piala FA competition has reverted to the old format of play with no more open draws. It will be involve 30 teams — 16 Super League and 14 Premier League sides — with defending league champions Selangor FA, defending cup winners Negeri Sembilan FA and runner's up Kedah FA receiving byes in the first round.

For the 2011 year edition, In the first round and the second league will only play one legged match instead playing a two legged match unlike the previous edition.

The winner of the 2011 edition will qualify to the 2012 AFC Cup.

== Piala FA Matches ==
=== First round ===
Friday 18 February	T-Team (Terengganu)	1–1 (5–6 p)	Kelantan FA	Sultan Ismail Nasiruddin Shah Stadium, Terengganu
8:45 GMT	Indra Putra 61'		52' Rizal Fahmi	Attendance: 18,000
	Penalties
	Indra Putra (penalty scored); Khairul Ezwan (penalty scored); Haris Safwan (penalty scored); Badrul Hisani (penalty scored); Shamsul kamal (penalty scored); Norfazly (penalty missed)		(penalty scored) Norshahrul; (penalty scored) Rizal Fahmi; (penalty scored) Azwan roya (penalty scored) Shakir; (penalty scored) Daudsu; (penalty scored) Danial fadzly

Friday 18 February	Harimau Muda A (Malaysia)	4–0	(Penang) SDMS Kepala Batas FC	Shah Alam Stadium, Selangor
8:45 GMT	K.Ravindran 10,48'; Amer Saidin 37'; Ferris Danial 77'

Saturday 19 February	PKNS FC (Selangor)	5–0	(Johor) MP Muar	MBPJ Stadium, Kelana Jaya
8:45 GMT	Khairul Akyar 37,53'; P. Rajesh 56'; Khairul Azrin 61,86'			Attendance: 8,000

Saturday 19 February	Pahang FA	2–1	Sabah FA	Stadium Darul makmur Kuantan
8:45 GMT	R. Surendran 56'; Khartigesu 69'		71' Shahrul Azhar Ture	Attendance: 15,000

Saturday 19 February	PDRM FA (Malaysia)	1–4	Perak FA	Stadium Tuanku Abdul Rahman Paroi
8:45 GMT	Khairul Izuan 60'		6' Akmal Rizal; 30' Shahrulnizam; 51' Shafiq jamal 89' Razali umar	Attendance: 10,000; Referee: m

Saturday 19 February	Malacca FA	0–5	(Kuala Lumpur) Sime Darby F.C.	Stadium Hang Tuah Melaka
8:45 GMT			43' Mohd Fairuz; 61' Mohd Yusri; 70' A.Varathan; 83' Saiful Mustafa; 85' Mohizam Shah	Attendance: 8,000; Referee: m

Saturday 19 February	ATM FA (Malaysia)	2–0	Sarawak FA	Stadium MP Selayang
8:45 GMT	Fauzi Kassim 49'; A. Jaganathan 86'			Attendance: 6,000; Referee: m

Saturday 19 February	USM FC (Penang)	1–2	Terengganu FA	Stadium Olahraga USM
8:45 GMT	Mohd Baser 58'		19' Zharif; 44' Abdul Hadi	Attendance: 2,000; Referee: m

Saturday 19 February	Melodi Jaya Sports Club (Johor)	0–4	(Malaysia) Harimau Muda B	Kompleks sukan Nusa Mutiara
8:45 GMT			44,90' Mohd Syamin; 66' Mohd Syazwan; 88' Nor hakim	Attendance: 1,000; Referee: m

Saturday 19 February	Penang FA	1–5	Johor FA	Stadium Negeri Batu Kawan
8:45 GMT	Noraslan 82'		17,79' Norizam salaman 60' Adib Aizuddin; 73' Mohd Alif; 90' Asyraf Al Japri	Attendance: 5,000; Referee: m

Saturday 19 February	Johor FC	5–0	(Kuala Lumpur) KL Spa FC	Stadium Jcorp Pasir Gudang
8:45 GMT	Shahrizal 9,64'; Hamzani 25'; Mohd Syafuan 72'; Mohd Rashid Aya 87'			Attendance: 12,000; Referee: m

Saturday 19 February	Perlis FA	0–2	(Kuala Lumpur) Felda United FC	Stadium Utama Negeri Kangar
8:45 GMT			55' Rashid Mahmud; 90' Zamri chin	Attendance: 5,000; Referee: m

Saturday 20 February	Kuala Lumpur FA	3 - 0	(Kuala Lumpur) Pos Malaysia FC	Stadium MP Selayang
8:45 GMT	Afiq Azmi 48'; Badrul Hisyam 51,70'			Attendance: 3,000

=== Second round ===
Thursday 3 March	Harimau Muda A (Malaysia)	1 - 2	Johor FA	Stadium Bukit Jalil
8:45 GMT	Norhamizarif Hamid 61'		Jasazrin Jamaluddin 11'; Mohd Norizam Salaman 67'	Attendance: 5,000

Friday 4 March	Negeri Sembilan FA	0 - 0 (2–4 p)	Kuala Lumpur FA	Stadium Tuanku Abdul Rahman Paroi
8:45 GMT				Attendance: 10,000

Friday 4 March	PKNS FC (Selangor)	1 - 3	Pahang FA	Stadium MBBJ Kelana Jaya
8:45 GMT	Zakaria 29'		Baharuddin 50'; Sayuti 54', 86'	Attendance: 500

Friday 4 March	Perak FA	3 - 0	(Kuala Lumpur) Sime Darby F.C.	Stadium Perak Ipoh
8:45 GMT	Mustafa 81'; Kandasamy 83'; Akmal Rizal 90+1'			Attendance: 20,000

Friday 4 March	ATM FA (Malaysia)	2 - 3	Terengganu	Stadium MP Selayang
8:45 GMT	Fatrurazi Rozi 45'; Chee Saad 75'		Abdul Hadi 22'; Ashaari 36', 59'	Referee: 230

Friday 4 March	Selangor FA	2 - 1	(Malaysia) Harimau Muda B	Stadium Shah Alam
8:45 GMT	Razman 35'; Hadi Zainal 38'		Saarvindran 67'	Referee: 4,500

Friday 4 March	Johor FC	0 - 1	Kelantan	Stadium JCORP Pasir Gudang
8:45 GMT			Badri Radzi 10'	Referee: 1000

Friday 4 March	Felda United FC (Kuala Lumpur)	1 - 0	Kedah	Stadium Kuala lumpur Cheras
8:45 GMT	Fadzir Hassan 82'			Attendance: 800

=== Quarter-finals ===
The first leg matches will be played on 9 March 2010, with the second legs to be held on 20 March 2010.

Team 1	Agg.	Team 2	1st leg	2nd leg
Kuala Lumpur FA (Federal Territories of Malaysia)	1–2	Pahang FA	1-2	0–0
Perak FA	4-5	Terengganu FA	3–2	1–3
Selangor FA	5–2	Johor FA	3–1	2–1
Kelantan FA	5–2	(Federal Territories of Malaysia) Felda United FC	2–2	3–0

=== Semi-finals ===
The first leg matches will be played on 30 March 2010, with the second legs to be held on 3 April 2010.

Team 1	Agg.	Team 2	1st leg	2nd leg
Pahang FA	2–5	Terengganu FA	2–3	0–2
Selangor FA	2–6	Kelantan FA	1–5	1–1

=== Final ===
The final was played at National Stadium, Bukit Jalil, Kuala Lumpur, on Saturday, 11 June 2011.

Saturday 11 June
8:45 GMT

Terengganu FA	2 - 1 (a.e.t.)	Kelantan FA
Daudsu 90+8' (o.g.); Nordin Alias 110'		Azwan Roya 79'

National Stadium, Bukit Jalil, Kuala Lumpur
Attendance: 87,500
Referee: Subkhiddin Mohd Salleh

== Winners ==
Piala FA 2011 Winner

Terengganu FA
2nd Piala FA Title
