= Mustapa =

Mustapa is both a Malaysian masculine given name and surname. Notable people with the name include:

== Given name ==
- Mustapa Mohamed, Malaysian politician

== Surname ==
- Fatehah Mustapa (born 1989), Malaysian cyclist
- Shahrulnizam Mustapa (born 1981), Malaysian footballer
