= Izuan =

Izuan is a Malaysian masculine given name. Notable people with the name include:

- Khairul Izuan Abdullah (born 1986), Malaysian footballer
- Muhammad Izuan Ahmad Kasim (born 1991), Malaysian politician
- Harizul Izuan Abdul Rani (born 1982), Malaysian footballer
- Mohd Khairul Izuan bin Rosli (born 1991), Malaysian footballer
- Izuan Salahuddin (born 1991), Malaysian footballer
