= Khaidir Buyong =

Malaysian footballer and coach

Datuk Khaidir bin Buyong is a former football player and coach.

In his playing days, Khaidir played for Selangor FA and PKNS FC in the 1970s and 1980s. He was also capped for the Malaysia national team.

After his playing days ended, Khaidir turned to coaching. Among teams that he coached are his former teams Selangor and PKNS FC. Khaidir also coached Perak FA, ATM FA and assistant coach of Malaysia. Later he held the position of Secretary in Malaysia Football Coaches Association.
