= 1989 Liga Semi-Pro Divisyen 2 =

- Season: 1989
- Champions: Perlis; 1st Second Division title
- Promoted: Perlis; Perak; Sabah
- Matches: 112

The 1989 Liga Semi-Pro Divisyen 2 season is the inaugural season of Liga Semi-Pro Divisyen 2. A total of eight teams participated in the season.

The division comprised the bottom eight teams from the 1988 Malaysian League season.

Under the new format, only the top six teams in Divisyen 1 and the Divisyen 2 champions and runners-up will be involved in the Malaysia Cup. Malaysia Cup was played from the quarter-final stage, scheduled for November after the league was finished. The Malaysia Cup quarter-final and semi-final matches will be played on a home and away basis.

The season kicked off on 1 July 1989. Perlis ended up the season by winning the title.

== Teams ==
Eight teams competing in the first season of Liga Semi-Pro Divisyen 2.

- Perlis (1989 Liga Semi-Pro Divisyen 2 champions)
- Perak (Promoted to Liga Semi-Pro Divisyen 1)
- Sabah (Promoted to Liga Semi-Pro Divisyen 1)
- Terengganu
- (Malacca) Melaka
- (Malaysia) ATM
- Negeri Sembilan
- Brunei

== Champions ==
1989 Liga Semi-Pro Divisyen 2 champion

1st title
