= Mohd Haizal Faquan Sadarudin =

Malaysian footballer

Haizal Faquan
Personal information
- Full name: Mohd Haizal Faquan Bin Sadarudin
- Date of birth: 15 February 1991 (age 35)
- Place of birth: Ipoh, Perak, Malaysia
- Height: 1.70 m (5 ft 7 in)
- Position: Defender

Team information
- Current team: PJ Rangers

Youth career
- 2012–: Perak FA

Senior career*
Years	Team	Apps	(Gls)
2013–2014	Perak FA	13	(0)
2015	DRB-Hicom F.C.	0	(0)
- * Club domestic league appearances and goals as of 3 April 2014

Mohd Haizal Faquan Sadarudin (born 15 February 1991) is a Malaysian footballer. He currently played as a defender for DRB-Hicom F.C.

Starting his career at Perak youth system, he was in the Perak under-23 team that won 2012 Malaysia President Cup and 2012 King's Gold Cup. He was promoted to the senior team for the 2013 Malaysia Super League campaign. Due to injuries and suspensions to the senior players, Haizal made his league debut on 15 January 2013 in a match against Felda United FC.

Haizal's contract with Perak was terminated in early April 2014 due to long term injuries, which restricted his appearances to only one league game in the 2014 Super League season.
