= Toni Netto =

Brazilian footballer and manager

Antonio Gonzaga Netto, or more known as Toni Netto is a Brazilian football manager and former player.

He managed teams in Middle East (Kuwait, Oman, Qatar and Saudi Arabia) and Southeast Asia (Malaysia and Indonesia) during his career.

In Malaysia, arguably his most well known successful stint in Perak FA from 2002 to 2005, bringing 2 league titles (Malaysia Premier One, predecessor to Malaysia Super League) and 2 cup titles (Malaysia FA Cup and Malaysia Charity Shield) to Perak. This includes winning the first league title for Perak in 13 years, in his debut year in 2002. For his services to Perak football, he received the Paduka Mahkota Perak award from Sultan of Perak, Raja Azlan Shah in 2005.

He also managed Persipura Jayapura in early 2006, after his stint with Perak. But when the defending Indonesian champion made the worst start to the 2006 championship, losing two and drawing two of their first four matches, he was released in February 2006 along with his assistant Yusak Susanto. Later in the same year he was back in Malaysia for a short spell with struggling club MPPJ FC.
