= Razali Umar Kandasamy =

Malaysian footballer (born 1986)

Razali Umar
Personal information
- Full name: Razali bin Umar Kandasamy
- Date of birth: 5 August 1986 (age 40)
- Place of birth: Perak, Malaysia
- Height: 1.78 m (5 ft 10 in)
- Positions: Attacking midfielder; striker

Youth career
- 2002–2004: Perak FA President Cup's Team

Senior career*
Years	Team	Apps	(Gls)
2004–2011	Perak FA	59	(22)
2012	Sime Darby	38	(19)
2013	Felda United	16	(6)
2014	Perak FA	1	(0)
2015	MISC-MIFA	1	(0)
2016	Perak FA	0	(0)

International career^{‡}
2009	Malaysia U-23	2	(0)
- * Club domestic league appearances and goals as of September 07, 2016 ‡ National team caps and goals as of September 07, 2016

Razali Umar Kandasamy (born 5 August 1986) is a Malaysian former footballer. Razali plays mainly as a striker.

== Career ==
Razali started his career in Perak youth system. He came to prominence in President Cup Malaysia competition when he helped Perak under-21 team win the 2007 competition. He contributed to the win with 31 goals, making him the competition's top scorer in the process.

After the President Cup success, Perak head coach at the time, Steve Darby started to give him appearances in the main squad. The departures of several main players in 2009 and 2010 meant that Razali was a fixture in Perak main squad under M. Karathu and Raja Azlan Shah Raja So'ib. He was also the main striker in 2011, competing with Akmal Rizal and Shafiq Jamal under coach Norizan Bakar.

Due to his frequent disappearance in training, Perak management have announced his contract would be terminated on 1 June 2011.

After Perak, he played for Sime Darby FC, which he joined in November 2011. In 2013, he joined another club team Felda United, in the 2013 Malaysia Super League competition.

Razali returned to sign with Perak FA after almost a year without a club in May 2014. The next season, he joined FAM League side MISC-MIFA, and in the middle of 2016, re-joined Perak FA. He was released at the end of the season. As of 2018, this is the final professional team Razali has played in.

== National team ==
Kandasamy played for Malaysia under-23 national football team. He was called to trial for the Malaysian national team in 2009 but dropped out due to injury.
