= Raja Azlan Shah (footballer) =

Malaysian Coach

Personal information
- Full name: Raja Azlan Shah Bin Raja So'ib
- Date of birth: 10 November 1968 (age 57)
- Place of birth: Ipoh, Malaysia
- Position: Defender

Youth career
- 1985–1986: Perak FA

Senior career*
Years	Team	Apps	(Gls)
1986–1987	Perak FA		
1987–1994	Kuala Lumpur FA		
1995–2001	Perak FA		

International career^{‡}
1987–1991	Malaysia		

Managerial career
- 2007–2008: Perak FA (youth)
- 2010: Perak FA
- 2011–: National Football Development Programme of Malaysia
- * Club domestic league appearances and goals as of 24 November 2006 ‡ National team caps and goals as of 24 September 2012

Raja Azlan Shah bin Raja So'ib PPT, PJK (born 10 November 1968) is a Malaysian former football player and coach. His preferred playing position is as a defender.

== Career as player ==
He formerly played for Perak FA and Kuala Lumpur FA. He was in the Kuala Lumpur team that won Malaysia Cup three consecutive seasons (1987, 1988, 1989) and FA Cup two consecutive seasons (1993, 1994). Later, with Perak, he also won the Malaysia Cup two times (1998, 2000) and runners-up (2001).

Raja Azlan Shah also represents Malaysia in international tournaments. He was in the Malaysia team that competes in 1991 SEA Games in Manila.

== Career as coach ==
After retiring from playing professionally in 2002, he has taken various coaching role in Perak football youth development. His Perak youth team has won the 2002 Sukma Games football tournament. The Perak President Cup team has also won the 2007 President Cup with him at the helm.

He has been the assistant head coach for Perak senior team under Steve Darby and M. Karathu. For the 2010 season, he was appointed the head coach of Perak. However, the exit of many senior players due to financial difficulties has forced him to play many young players. The results in Super League is a lowly 11th place out of 14 teams, where Perak narrowly avoid relegation and barely qualify for Malaysia Cup. Perak disappointingly exited the Malaysia Cup at the group stage. Due to these results, he was replaced by Norizan Bakar as head coach for 2011 season.

For the 2011 season, he was appointed the Technical, Coaching & Development Director of Perak FA. In 2012, he was appointed Technical, Coaching & Development Director for the National Sports Council of Malaysia.
