= Chan Wing Hoong =

Malaysian footballer

Personal information
- Full name: Chan Wing Hoong
- Date of birth: 29 April 1977 (age 49)
- Place of birth: Ipoh, Perak, Malaysia
- Height: 1.73 m (5 ft 8 in)
- Position: Defender

Team information
- Current team: Perak President's Cup Asst. Head Coach

Youth career
- 1995–1997: Perak FA

Senior career*
Years	Team	Apps	(Gls)
1998–2005	Perak FA		
2006	Selangor MPPJ		
2007–2008	Perak FA		
2008	DPMM FC	0	(0)
2009	Perlis FA		
2010	ATM FA		
2011–2012	Perak FA	9	(0)

International career
1996–1998	Malaysia U23	12	(0)
2002–2007	Malaysia	11	(0)
- * Club domestic league appearances and goals as of 6 April 2021

Chan Wing Hoong (Chinese: 陈永雄; pinyin: Chen Yongxiong; born 29 April 1977 in Ipoh, Perak) is a Malaysian retired professional football player, who last played in the 2012 Malaysia Super League with his hometown team Perak FA. He was primarily employed as a left-sided defender, but has on occasion played as a left-sided midfielder.

== Career ==
Wing Hoong was one of the Perak's longest serving players. His first spell with the side was between 1998 and 2005. He had two more spells with Perak in 2007–08 and his recent spell from 2011 to 2012. He has won the Malaysia Cup in 1998 and 2000 as well as runners up in 2001 and 2007, and also won Malaysia Premier League One title in 2002 and 2003.

Before the 2006 season began, Wing Hoong, along with his teammate K Nanthakumar, left Perak following a salary dispute with team management Both Wing Hoong and Nanthakumar then joined Selangor MPPJ, which was then dubbed the 'Chelsea' of Malaysia and reformed their defensive partnership there. However, following the withdrawal of MPPJ for the 2007 season, both Wing Hoong and Nanthakumar were brought back to Perak. By this time, a new management team had taken over and were practising a policy of recruiting Perak born players.

Besides Perak and MPPJ, he also has played for ATM FA and Perlis FA. He also signed for Brunei DPMM FC in 2009 and played in pre-season with them but left after the team was barred from entering the 2009 Malaysia Super League.

He was a member of the national team and participated in 2002 Tiger Cup, 2006 Merdeka Tournament and the 2007 ASEAN Football Championship.

After battling with injuries which restricted his appearances for Perak in the 2012 Malaysia Super League, he retired from professional football at the end of the league season on 18 July 2012.

== Personal life ==
Wing Hoong's father, Chan Kok Foo, was also a football player for Perak and Malaysia in the 1970s.
