= 2011 Malaysia Super League =

Malaysia Super League
- Season: 2011
- Champions: Kelantan; 1st title
- Relegated: Perlis; Pahang
- 2012 AFC Cup: Kelantan; Terengganu
- Matches: 182
- Goals: 437 (2.4 per match)
- Top goalscorer: Abdul Hadi Yahya (20 goals, Terengganu)
- Biggest home win: Selangor 7–1 Perlis (6 June 2011)
- Biggest away win: Felda United 2–6 Terengganu (6 July 2011)
- Highest scoring: Perak 5–3 Kuala Lumpur (24 April 2011); Selangor 7–1 Perlis (6 June 2011); Perlis 2–6 Terengganu (6 July 2011)
- Longest winning run: 6 matches Kelantan (25 May 2011)
- Longest unbeaten run: 11 matches Kelantan; Terengganu
- Longest losing run: 8 matches Perlis (until end of season)
- Highest attendance: 35,000; Kelantan–Perak (14 June 2011)
- Lowest attendance: 31; Perlis–Felda United (28 May 2011)

The 2011 Liga Super Malaysia was the eighth season of the Malaysia Super League, the top-tier professional football league in Malaysia. The season was held from 29 January and concluded on 30 July 2011. Selangor is the current defending champions.

== Team changes ==
The following teams have changed division.

=== To Malaysia Super League ===
Promoted from Premier League

- Felda United
- Sabah
- Harimau Muda A

=== From Malaysia Super League ===
Relegated to Premier League

- Johor
- Penang

Withrawal

- PLUS FC

== Teams ==
A total of fourteen teams will contest the league, including twelve sides from the 2010 season and two promoted teams from the 2010 Malaysia Premier League. Johor and Penang were relegated at the end of last season league after finishing the season in the bottom two places of the league table. 2010 Malaysia Premier League champions Felda United and runners-up Sabah secured direct promotion to the Malaysia Super League.

Harimau Muda A secured a place in the Malaysia Super League after PLUS withdrew. Harimau had won the 2009 Malaysia Premier League before playing the 2010 campaign in the Slovak First League. Harimau represent the Malaysian Under 23 national football team.

=== Vanues ===
Team	Location	Stadium	Capacity
Felda United	Kuala Lumpur	KLFA Stadium	18,000
Harimau Muda A	Shah Alam	Shah Alam Stadium	80,000
Johor FC	Pasir Gudang	Pasir Gudang Corporation Stadium	15,000
Kedah	Alor Setar	Darul Aman Stadium	32,387
Kelantan	Kota Bharu	Sultan Mohammad IV Stadium	30,000
Kuala Lumpur	Kuala Lumpur	KLFA Stadium	18,000
Negeri Sembilan	Paroi	Tuanku Abdul Rahman Stadium	40,000
Pahang	Kuantan	Darul Makmur Stadium	35,000
Perak	Ipoh	Perak Stadium	35,000
Perlis	Kangar	Utama Stadium	20,000
Sabah	Kota Kinabalu	Likas Stadium	35,000
Selangor	Shah Alam	Shah Alam Stadium	80,000
Terengganu	Kuala Terengganu	Sultan Ismail Nasiruddin Shah Stadium	15,000
T–Team	Kuala Terengganu	Sultan Ismail Nasiruddin Shah Stadium	15,000

Locations of teams in the 2011 Malaysia Super League.

=== Personnel and kits ===
Team	Coach	Captain	Kit manufacturer	Shirt sponsor
Felda United	(Malaysia) E. Elavarasan	(Malaysia) Khaironnisam Sahabudin	Kappa	FELDA
Harimau Muda A	(Malaysia) Ong Kim Swee	(Malaysia) Mohd Muslim Ahmad	Nike	
Johor FC	(Malaysia) Azuan Zain	(Malaysia) Rezal Zambery Yahya	JKiNG	Kulim (Malaysia) Berhad
Kedah	(Malaysia) Wan Jamak Wan Hassan	(Malaysia) Ahmad Fauzi Shaari	Lotto	Perbadanan Kemajuan Negeri Kedah (PKNK)
Kelantan	(Malaysia) M. Karathu	(Malaysia) Mohd Badhri Mohd Radzi	Umbro	Happy
Kuala Lumpur	(Malaysia) Razip Ismail	(Malaysia) Muhd Shahrom Abdul Kalam	Kika	
Negeri Sembilan	(Malaysia) Mohd Azraai Khor Abdullah	(Malaysia) Muhammad Shukor Adan	Lotto	
Pahang	(Malaysia) Dollah Salleh	(Malaysia) Jalaluddin Jaafar	Lotto	Genting Group
Perak	(Malaysia) Norizan Bakar	(Malaysia) Shahrulnizam Mustapa	Specs	Majlis Bandaraya Ipoh (MBI)
Perlis	(Hungary) Jánós Krécská	(Malaysia) Azmizi Azmi	Kika	Yayasan Pok Kassim
Sabah	(Malaysia) Justin Ganai	(Malaysia) Mohd Reithaudin Awang Emran	Adidas	Ararat Sport
Selangor	(Malaysia) K. Devan	(Malaysia) Mohd Amri Yahyah	Kappa	Menteri Besar Incorporated (MBI)
Terengganu	(Malaysia) Irfan Bakti Abu Salim	(Malaysia) Mohd Marzuki Yusof	Specs	Top IT
T–Team	(Malaysia) Yunus Alif	(Malaysia) Rosdi Talib	Admiral	Admiral

=== Coaching changes ===
Club	Outgoing Head Coach	Date of vacancy	Manner of departure	Incoming Head Coach	Date of appointment
Kelantan	Bhaskaran Sathianathan	24 January 2011	Resigned	Maruthaiah Karathu	26 January 2011
Perlis	Mosthakeen Omar	1 March 2011	Resigned	Salim Tofel Mohamad (caretaker)	8 March 2011
Kedah	Ahmad Yusof	7 March 2011	Gardening leave^{1}	Muhamad Radhi Mat Din (caretaker)	7 March 2011
Negeri Sembilan	Wan Jamak Wan Hassan	16 March 2011	Resigned	Mohd Azraai Khor Abdullah	21 March 2011
Kedah	Muhamad Radhi Mat Din (caretaker)	23 April 2011	End of caretaker role	Wan Jamak Wan Hassan	23 April 2011
Perlis	Salim Tofel Mohamad (caretaker)	26 April 2011	End of caretaker role	Jánós Krécská	26 April 2011
Sabah	Gary Phillips	5 May 2011	Sacked	Justin Ganai	5 May 2011

- ^{1}Ahmad Yusof was put on indefinite leave on 7 March 2011, but is still contracted to Kedah FA. His contract was only terminated by mutual consent on 22 April 2011. Subsequently, he joined Penang as head coach on 1 May 2011.

== League table ==
Pos	Team	Pld	W	D	L	GF	GA	GD	Pts	Qualification or relegation
1	Kelantan (C)	26	17	5	4	52	21	+31	56	Qualification to AFC Cup group stage (Note: Terengganu qualified for the AFC Cup group stage by winning the 2011 Malaysia FA Cup. They automatically advanced to the group stage due to restructuring of the East Zone playoffs.)
2	Terengganu	26	16	5	5	54	26	+28	53	Qualification to AFC Cup group stage
3	Selangor	26	16	4	6	42	24	+18	52	
4	Kedah	26	13	6	7	25	20	+5	45	
5	Harimau Muda A	26	12	7	7	38	28	+10	43	
6	Perak	26	10	10	6	31	24	+7	40	
7	Johor FC	26	8	10	8	26	28	−2	34	
8	Negeri Sembilan	26	8	8	10	29	32	−3	32	
9	T–Team	26	9	4	13	35	40	−5	31	
10	Sabah	26	7	7	12	24	32	−8	28	
11	Felda United	26	7	7	12	22	34	−12	28	
12	Kuala Lumpur	26	6	8	12	23	34	−11	26	
13	Pahang (R)	26	5	7	14	19	36	−17	22	Relegation to Premier League
14	Perlis (R)	26	2	4	20	20	61	−41	10	Relegation to Premier League

Updated to match(es) played on unknown. Source: FIFA
Rules for classification: 1) Points; 2) Goal difference; 3) Number of goals scored.
(C) Champions; (R) Relegated

== Results ==
Home \ Away	FEL	JFC	KED	KEL	KLU	NSE	PHG	T-T	PRK	PER	SAB	SEL	TRG	HMA
Felda United		0–0	1–2	1–3	2–1	2–2	2–1	2–0	0–1	2–0	1–1	0–1	2–6	2–0
Johor FC	0–0		0–1	0–1	0–0	0–0	2–1	2–1	1–1	2–1	3–0	0–0	2–1	0–1
Kedah	1–0	1–2		1–1	0–0	1–1	1–0	0–0	0–0	2–0	1–1	0–2	2–1	1–2
Kelantan	6–0	4–1	2–0		2–0	3–0	1–0	1–2	1–0	4–0	0–0	1–0	1–1	2–1
Kuala Lumpur FA	0–0	1–2	0–1	0–2		1–1	0–0	3–1	1–1	3–0	1–0	1–3	1–2	0–1
Negeri Sembilan	0–1	2–1	0–2	0–0	0–1		3–1	4–0	3–1	2–0	1–0	1–2	1–1	1–0
Pahang	0–0	0–0	0–1	2–0	0–2	1–1		1–0	0–2	3–1	2–2	2–1	1–2	0–2
T–Team	2–0	1–1	3–1	4–3	2–3	1–3	0–0		0–0	3–0	3–0	2–1	0–1	1–3
Perak	1–0	1–0	1–3	4–0	5–3	2–0	0–0	2–0		2–1	1–1	0–0	1–1	1–1
Perlis	0–1	2–2	0–1	1–5	0–0	3–2	1–2	2–1	1–2		0–1	0–2	1–3	1–3
Sabah	2–1	0–1	1–0	1–2	3–0	2–0	2–0	1–3	2–1	2–2		1–2	1–2	0–2
Selangor	2–1	3–2	2–0	0–2	1–1	2–0	2–1	0–2	1–0	7–1	1–0		3–2	1–2
Terengganu	1–0	3–0	0–1	0–3	4–0	3–0	5–0	3–2	3–0	3–1	3–0	1–1		3–1
Harimau Muda A	1–1	2–2	0–1	2–2	1–0	1–1	3–1	3–1	1–1	1–1	2–0	1–2	1–2	

Updated to match(es) played on 6 July 2011. Source: Liga Super
Legend: Blue = home team win; Yellow = draw; Red = away team win.

== Season statistics ==
=== Top scorers ===
Rank	Player	Club	Goals
1	Abdul Hadi Yahya	Terengganu	20
2	Norshahrul Idlan Talaha	Kelantan	19
3	Abdul Manaf Mamat	Terengganu	13
4	Indra Putra Mahayuddin	T–Team	11
5	Mohd Badhri Mohd Radzi	Kelantan	10
5	Mohd Ashaari Shamsuddin	Terengganu	10
6	Akmal Rizal Ahmad Rakhli	Perak	9
6	Baddrol Bakhtiar	Kedah	9
6	Izzaq Faris Ramlan	Harimau Muda A	9
7	Ahmad Hazwan Bakri	Kuala Lumpur	7
7	Mohd Fandi Othman	Harimau Muda A	7
7	Mohd Firdaus Azizul	Negeri Sembilan	7
7	Mohd Safiq Rahim	Selangor	7

== See also ==
- List of Liga Super seasons
- 2011 Liga Premier
