= Mohd Khairi Zainudin =

Malaysian footballer

Personal information
- Full name: Mohd Khairi bin Zainudin
- Date of birth: 14 March 1978 (age 48)
- Place of birth: Kuala Lumpur, Malaysia
- Position: Defender

Team information
- Current team: Perlis FA

Youth career
- 1996–1998: Kuala Lumpur FA Kuala Lumpur President Cup

Senior career*
Years	Team	Apps	(Gls)
1998–1999	Kuala Lumpur FA	18	(0)
1999–2000	PDRM FA	21	(0)
2000–2002	Kuala Lumpur FA	32	(1)
2002	→ Telekom Melaka (loan)	6	(0)
2002–2003	Telekom Melaka	22	(0)
2003–2005	Perlis FA	26	(0)
2005–2008	Perak FA	32	(0)
2008–2009	Kuala Lumpur FA	22	(0)
2009–2010	PKNS FC	30	(0)
2010–2012	Perak FA	29	(0)
2013	Sime Darby F.C.	21	(0)
2014	Perlis FA	0	(0)
- * Club domestic league appearances and goals as of 19 July 2013 ‡ National team caps and goals as of 26 April 2013

Mohd Khairi bin Zainudin (born 14 March 1978) is a Malaysian footballer. His favoured playing position is as a defender.

== Career ==
Khairi's nomadic career begins in Kuala Lumpur FA where he started in their youth team. Promoted to the senior team in 1998, he played for one season before heading to PDRM FA for the 2000 season. He was back in Kuala Lumpur a year after, before leaving them again on loan to Telekom Melaka FC in 2002. He leaves the city team for good to sign permanently for Telekom Melaka at the end of 2002.

He then signed for Perlis FA for the 2004 season. Undoubtedly, his best achievements were in Perlis, where he helped the team to win the Malaysia Cup in 2004 despite not playing regularly for the team that season. He renewed his contract with Perlis for another year, and he was in the team that entered the Malaysia Cup final for the second year running, although this time they lost the Malaysia Cup to Bambang Pamungkas-inspired Selangor FA. Khairi also won Malaysia Super League championship and the Malaysia Charity Shield (both in 2005) while he was at Perlis.

After Perlis, he played for Perak FA for three seasons, returns to his old team Kuala Lumpur for the 2009 season, before signing for PKNS FC for the 2010 season.

He returned to Perak for the 2011 season. He played for two seasons with Perak, before being released at the end of 2012 season. Khairi joined Sime Darby FC along with four other former Perak players for the 2013 season.
