= Wan Hossen =

Malaysian footballer

Personal information
- Birth name: Wan Hossen bin Wan Abdul Ghani
- Date of birth: 8 February 1989 (age 37)
- Place of birth: Perak, Malaysia
- Height: 1.70 m (5 ft 7 in)
- Position: Midfielder

Team information
- Current team: Kedah United F.C.
- Number: 26

Youth career
- 2006–2008: Perak FA President Cup's Team

Senior career*
Years	Team	Apps	(Gls)
2008–2009	Perak FA	9	(0)
2010	Penang FA	24	(3)
2011–2012	Perak FA	11	(0)
2013	Kedah FA	13	(1)
2014	Malacca United S.A.	13	(1)
2015	Kedah United F.C.	2	(0)
2016	Sungai Ara FC		
- * Club domestic league appearances and goals as of 13 December 2013

Wan Hossen bin Wan Abdul Ghani (born 8 February 1989) is a Malaysian footballer. His preferred position is as a midfielder.

== Career ==
Wan Hossen Bin Wan Abd Ghani started playing football while he was in primary school in his previous school SK Mahkota Sari, Gerik. His ability were seen by his coach Cikgu Nizam. After that, he was chosen to play for his district, Hulu Perak and from that, his interest in football glooming. The skill was polish next while he was studied at SMK Anderson Ipoh and the coach Encik Khairil is the person who responsible in establish his skill until qualified to be a captain for Anderson School.

Once he start playing with Anderson, his ability has been seen by Perak youth squad, starting with join Belia, Presiden and Perak liga super team. Wan Hossen started his professional career in Perak youth squad. He started to feature more often in the Perak main squad in the 2009 season. In search for more first team opportunities, he leaves Perak to join Penang FA for the 2010 season.

Wan Hossen returned to Perak for the 2011 season. Playing with Perak for two seasons, he was released again by Perak at the end of 2012 season.

In 2013, Wan Hossen played with Kedah FA in 2013 Malaysia Premier League. At the end of the season, he joined Malacca United, a team in the 2014 Malaysia FAM League.

=== Malacca United F.C. ===
On 18 December 2013, Wan Hossen made his debut for Malacca United F.C. in a friendly match against JDT II FC that ended in a 1-1 draw.

=== Kedah United F.C. ===
In 2015, Wan Hossen played with Kedah United F.C. in 2015 Malaysia FAM League.

=== Sungai Ara F.C. ===
2016, He signed for Sungai Ara FC, team from Pulau Penang that competed in FAM League, the third tier of Malaysia football hierarchy. Which is made the fourth club from northern part of Malaya he played for after Pulau Pinang, kedah and Perak.
