= Khairul Amri (footballer, born 1989) =

Malaysian footballer

Personal information
- Full name: Khairul Amri bin Salehuddin
- Date of birth: 22 December 1989 (age 36)
- Place of birth: Perak, Malaysia
- Height: 1.80 m (5 ft 11 in)
- Position: Goalkeeper

Team information
- Current team: Perak TBG
- Number: 18

Youth career
- 2006–2008: Perak President's Cup

Senior career*
Years	Team	Apps	(Gls)
2009–2013	Perak	12	(0)
2014–2016	Penang	1	(0)
2017–	Perak	5	(0)
- * Club domestic league appearances and goals as of 25 June 2019

Khairul Amri bin Salehuddin (born 22 December 1989) is a Malaysian footballer who plays as a goalkeeper for Perak in Malaysia Super League.

== Club career ==
Khairul Amri started his professional career in Perak youth teams. He was in the Perak team that competes in the Sukma Games 2008. He made his league debut in 2010, playing against Negeri Sembilan FA. He was also included in the Perak team that competes in the Sukma Games 2010. From 2010 to 2012, he is the third choice goalkeeper in the Perak team, behind Mohd Nasril Nourdin and Kamarul Effandi Abdul Rahim who is the first and the second choice goalkeeper respectively. After both goalkeepers were released from Perak and Mohd Farizal Marlias were brought in at the end of 2012, he was promoted to become second-choice goalkeeper behind Farizal.

In November 2013, Khairul Amri joined Malaysian Premier League side, Penang. Mainly a backup for the national team goalkeeper G. Jeevananthan, Khairul made his debut for the Panthers in place of Jeevanathan in a league match on 7 February 2014.

Khairul Amri returned to Perak for the 2017 season, and were retained in the team for the 2018 season.
