= Isma Alif Mohd Salim =

Malaysian footballer (born 1987)

Isma Alif
Personal information
- Full name: Isma Alif Bin Mohd Salim
- Date of birth: 22 February 1987 (age 39)
- Place of birth: Perak, Malaysia
- Height: 1.69 m (5 ft 6 1/2 in)
- Positions: Right back; midfielder

Youth career
- 2006–2008: Perak FA President Cup's Team

Senior career*
Years	Team	Apps	(Gls)
2008–2012	Perak FA	68	(3)
2013	PBDKT T-Team FC	12	(0)
2014	Sabah FA	21	(2)
2015	PDRM FA	18	(0)
2016	Kuala Lumpur FA	15	(0)
2017	Melaka United	13	(0)
2018	Marcerra United		

International career^{‡}
	Malaysia	0	(0)
- * Club domestic league appearances and goals as of June 12, 2020 ‡ National team caps and goals as of January 02, 2016

Isma Alif Bin Mohd Salim (born 22 February 1987) is a Malaysian footballer who plays for melaka united f.c. His preferred position is as a right back and midfielder, and specially as a right back.

== Career ==
Isma Alif started his professional career in Perak youth squad. Starting from the 2009 season, he was one of several Perak youth players promoted to main squad after the exodus of Perak players to other teams. He was released from his contract with Perak at the end of the 2012 season.

He joined PBDKT T-Team FC for the 2013 season.
