= Mohd Nasril Nourdin =

Malaysian footballer

Personal information
- Full name: Mohd Nasril bin Mat Nourdin
- Date of birth: 17 April 1986 (age 40)
- Place of birth: Perak, Malaysia
- Height: 1.85 m (6 ft 1 in)
- Position: Goalkeeper

Team information
- Current team: Selangor II (goalkeeping coach)

Youth career
- 2002–2004: Perak President's

Senior career*
| Years | Team | Apps | (Gls) |
| 2005–2008 | Perak | 14 | (0) |
| 2008–2009 | Selangor | 17 | (0) |
| 2009–2010 | ATM | 43 | (0) |
| 2010–2012 | Perak | 35 | (0) |
| 2012–2016 | Pahang | 29 | (0) |
| 2017 | Perlis | 19 | (0) |
| 2018–2022 | Langkawi City | 39 | (0) |

International career^{‡}
| 2005–2009 | Malaysia U-23 | 14 | (0) |
| 2010–2011 | Malaysia | 3 | (0) |

Managerial career
- 2022: Langkawi City
- 2023–: Selangor II (goalkeeping coach)
- * Club domestic league appearances and goals as of July 31, 2023 ‡ National team caps and goals as of January 3, 2016

Mohd Nasril bin Mat Nourdin (born 17 April 1986) is a Malaysian former professional footballer who played as a goalkeeper.

== Early days ==
Nasril was a product of the Bukit Jalil Sports School. He participated in the 2002 Sukma Games, representing Malaysian Schools Sports Council (Majlis Sukan Sekolah-Sekolah Malaysia (MSSM) in Malay).<ref"Sukma 2002 player records". Archived from the original on 27 September 2007.</ref> For the 2006 Sukma Games, however, he represented the state of Perak.

Nasril spent some time playing for Perak FA in their reserve squad, but an injury to first-choice keeper Mohd Hamsani Ahmad, coupled with the loss of form of usual back-up keeper Tay Sin Kiat forced coach Steve Darby to play Nasril.

== Career ==
Nasril made his first team debut on 4 December 2005, in a Malaysia Charity Shield match against Selangor which Perak won 4–1. Nasril's performance drew the plaudits of the media and coach Darby.

Perak continued to keep faith in Nasril, even after first-choice Hamsani returned from injury.

Nasril was nominated as one of the nation's top three goalkeepers in the inaugural Malaysian Football Awards, held in 2006. The other contenders were Terengganu's Mohd Syamsuri Mustafa and Negeri Sembilan's Azizon Abdul Kadir. Syamsuri eventually won the award.

=== Blackburn interest ===
Reports surfaced in September 2006 that Blackburn Rovers were keeping tabs on Nasril. It was reported Rovers scout Mike Riggs wanted to give Nasril a trial. It could be a problem getting a work permit though as Malaysia are 154th in the FIFA rankings and a national team needs to be in the top 70 to be considered for the Premier League. However, as of April 2007, nothing has materialised and interest seems to have cooled down.

=== Departure from Perak ===
He moved to Selangor FA for the 2009 season, alongside Hamsani. After just one season, which he failed to dislodge Hamsani for first-choice goalkeeper spot, he moved to ATM FA for the 2010 season.

=== Return to Perak ===
He returned to Perak for the 2011 season, where he was chosen as the first-choice goalkeeper by Perak new head coach Norizan Bakar. He played with Perak for two seasons, helping Perak to Super League's 4th place in 2011 and 6th place in 2012.

=== Pahang ===
He was not retained by Perak for 2013 Malaysia Super League season, so he joined newly promoted Pahang FA as a replacement for their former goalkeeper Wan Azraie Wan Teh who departed to Terengganu FA. In Pahang, he reunited with his former coach in Selangor, Dollah Salleh. He debuted for Pahang in the first league game against Darul Takzim FC on 9 January 2013.

== National team ==
On 24 January 2006, just slightly more than a month after his first team debut, Nasril was called up for centralised training with the national team and subsequently featured in their friendlies against New Zealand. On 2007, he played with Malaysia Under 23 side two match in 2008 Olympic Games qualifier against Syria and Japan. He also was the first choice goalkeeper in 2008 Intercontinental Cup held in Petaling Jaya as he was playing for Malaysia in the two matches against Iraq and Nigeria Olympic teams.

He was chosen several times in the Malaysia national football team, but so far has not made any official appearances. He however have made several appearances in the Malaysia League XI team that plays against international club teams visiting Malaysia, such as match against Arsenal F.C. on 13 July 2011.

== Honours ==
=== Club ===
- Malaysia Cup: 2
  - Winners (2): 2013,2014
  - Fa Cup: 1
  - Winners (2014)
  - Sumbangsih Cup: 1
  - Winners (1) (2014)
