= Harizul Izuan Abdul Rani =

Malaysian footballer (born 1982)

Harizul Izuan
Personal information
- Full name: Harizul Izuan bin Abdul Rani
- Date of birth: 3 March 1982 (age 44)
- Place of birth: Ipoh, Malaysia
- Position: Midfielder

Youth career
- 1999–2001: Perak FA President Cup's Team

Senior career*
| Years | Team | Apps | (Gls) |
| 2002 | TNB Kelantan | | |
| 2002–2006 | Perak FA | | |
| 2006–2007 | Kuala Muda NAZA FC | | |
| 2007–2008 | Perlis FA | | |
| 2009 | Proton FC | | |
| 2010 | PBDKT T-Team FC | | |
| 2011 | Perak FA | | |

International career
| 2005 | Malaysia under-23 | | |
- * Club domestic league appearances and goals as of 18 June 2011

Harizul Izuan Abdul Rani (born 3 March 1982) is a Malaysian footballer. His preferred position is as a midfielder.

== Career ==
Harizul started his professional career in Perak youth squad, however he was dropped for the 2002 season. He joins TNB Kelantan afterwards, but re-joins Perak in the mid-year of 2002. Since then he has been the mainstay of Perak squad, picking up the Premier 1 title in 2002 and 2003, winners of Malaysia FA Cup in 2004 and winners of Malaysia Charity Shield in 2005 and 2006.

After the 2006 season ended, he leaves Perak. He starts a one-team per season sojourn, beginning with Kuala Muda NAZA in 2007, then Perlis FA in 2008, Proton FC in 2009 and finally PBDKT T-Team FC for the 2010 season.

He returns to Perak for the 2011 season. However, he was released at the end of the season.

He had represented Perak in Sukma Games 2002.

== National team ==
Harizul represented the Malaysia SEA Games squad in Southeast Asia Games in 2005. Malaysia won the bronze medal in the Games.
