= Abdul Hadi Yahya =

Malaysian footballer (born 1985)

Personal information
- Full name: Abdul Hadi Bin Yahya
- Date of birth: 6 March 1985 (age 41)
- Place of birth: Klang, Selangor, Malaysia
- Height: 1.71 m (5 ft 7 1/2 in)
- Positions: Winger; forward

Team information
- Current team: Selangor United
- Number: 14

Senior career*
Years	Team	Apps	(Gls)
2006–2007	Selangor FA	6	(0)
2008	PKNS FC	15	(9)
2009–2010	Kuala Lumpur FA	32	(14)
2011	T-Team FC	20	(5)
2012	Terengganu FA	42	(24)
2013	Perak FA	18	(3)
2014–2016	Selangor FA	44	(8)
2017	Perak TBG	13	(2)
2018	Marcerra United	0	(0)
2018	MOF F.C.		
2019–	Selangor United	2	(0)

International career^{‡}
2011–2016	Malaysia	9	(2)
- * Club domestic league appearances and goals as of 8 February 2019 ‡ National team caps and goals as of 17 November 2016

Abdul Hadi Bin Yahya (born 6 March 1985 in Klang, Selangor) is a Malaysian professional footballer who plays as a forward. He is well known for his prolific goalscoring ability which he shown continuously in the domestic league.

He previously played for PBDKT T-Team during the 2010–11 Malaysian Super League season, Kuala Lumpur FA during the 2009–10 season, and PKNS during the 2007/2008. Prior to that, he played with Selangor from 2005 to 2007.

== Club career ==
Abdul Hadi started his footballing career with the famous Selangor President's Cup Team before being handed his debut with the first team in 2006. After leaving his boyhood team, he then search for more playing time with Klang Valley outfit PKNS FC and old rivals Kuala Lumpur FA. This move prove to be a successful one as he started to score goals and develop his potential. He then move to the east coast of Malaysia to play for Kuala Terengganu outfit PBDKT T-Team FC for the 2010 Malaysia Super League season.

As for the 2011 season he signed with Terengganu FA and already stamp his name among Malaysia best forward as he help his team lift the 2011 Malaysia F.A Cup and finish runners-up only behind Kelantan FA in the Malaysia Super League also topping the scoring charts with total number of 20 league goals.

He joined Perak FA for the 2013 Malaysia Super League season.

Hadi started the 2018 season with Marcerra Kuantan, but after the club was hit financial problems, and subsequently expelled from the league, he terminated his contract with them in April 2018 and joined MOF F.C. for the remainder of the season.

== International career ==
His superb form with Terengganu in the 2011 season earned him a call-up to the Malaysia squad for friendly against Hong Kong. He made his debut for Malaysia as a substitute, and scored his first international goal after only six minutes brought in, against Hong Kong on 3 June 2011.

== Career statistics ==
=== International goals ===
#	Date	Venue	Opponent	Score	Result	Competition
1.	3 June 2011	Siu Sai Wan Sports Ground, Hong Kong	Hong Kong	1–1	Draw	Friendly
2.	23 July 2011	Jalan Besar Stadium, Singapore	Singapore	3–5	Lost	2014 FIFA World Cup qualification – AFC second round

== Honours ==
Terengganu

- Malaysia FA Cup: 2011

Selangor

- Malaysia Cup: 2015

Individual

- Malaysia Super League Golden Boot: 2011 (20 goals)
