= Mohd Badrul Azam Mohd Zamri =

Malaysian footballer

Mohd Badrul Azam
Personal information
- Full name: Mohd Badrul Azam Mohd Zamri
- Date of birth: 18 September 1984 (age 42)
- Place of birth: Perak, Malaysia
- Position: Midfielder

Senior career*
Years	Team	Apps	(Gls)
2004–2007	Melaka TMFC		(6)
2007–2010	Perlis FA		(0)
2011	Felda United FC	9	(0)
2012	Perak FA	4	(0)
- * Club domestic league appearances and goals as of 10 April 2012

Mohd Badrul Azam Mohd Zamri is a Malaysian professional football player who is currently unattached, having most recently played for Perak FA in the Malaysian Super League as a midfielder.

Before joining Perak in 2012, he formerly played with Felda United FC, Perlis FA and defunct club Melaka TMFC. His league debut for Perak was in the first match of the season against Terengganu on 10 January 2012. An injury sustained during a league match made him miss almost all of Perak's league matches for the season, and was ruled out of the season's ending tournament 2012 Malaysia Cup. He was released by Perak at the end of the season.
