= Failee Ghazli =

Malaysian footballer

Mohd Failee Mohamad Ghazli
Personal information
- Full name: Muhammad Failee Bin Mohamad Ghazli
- Date of birth: 5 September 1987 (age 39)
- Place of birth: Parit Buntar, Perak, Malaysia
- Height: 1.70 m (5 ft 7 in)
- Position: Forward

Team information
- Current team: Puchong Fuerza FC
- Number: 10

Youth career
- 2005–2007: Penang President's Cup

Senior career*
Years	Team	Apps	(Gls)
2009–2010	Penang		
2011	USM	21	(11)
2011	→ Perak (loan)	7	(5)
2012–2013	Perak	18	(2)
2014	Sime Darby	16	(1)
2015–2017	Penang	19	(2)
2018–	MOF	4	(1)
2019-	Puchong Fuerza FC	-	(-)
- * Club domestic league appearances and goals as of April 1, 2018

Muhammad Failee bin Mohamad Ghazli (born 5 September 1987) is a Malaysian footballer who plays as a forward for MOF F.C. in the Malaysia FAM League.

He started his footballing career with Penang FA, before joining another Penang team USM FC in early 2011. He joined Perak on loan from USM FC in August 2011 for Perak's Malaysia Cup campaign, wearing number 31. After scoring 4 goal in 6 matches at the competition's group stage, and 1 goal in 2 knock-out matches, Failee have been rewarded with a permanent move to Perak for the 2012 Malaysia Super League season. He also had his squad number changed to 12. After spending one season with Sime Darby for 2014 season, Failee returns to Penang FA for the 2015 season to help Penang FA for their fight to win promotion for the Malaysia Super League. Failee moves to FAM League team MOF F.C. for the 2018 season.

His younger brother Faizat Ghazli is also a footballer.

== Honours ==
=== Club ===
Penang

- Malaysia Premier League: Promotion 2015
