= Syazwan Roslan =

Malaysian footballer

Personal information
- Full name: Mohd Syazwan Bin Mohd Roslan
- Date of birth: 22 March 1988 (age 38)
- Place of birth: Gerik, Perak, Malaysia
- Height: 1.78 m (5 ft 10 in)
- Position: Defender

Team information
- Current team: Perlis
- Number: 20

Youth career
- 2005–2007: Perak FA President Cup's Team

Senior career*
Years	Team	Apps	(Gls)
2006–2007	Perak	3	(0)
2007–2008	Perlis	36	(4)
2009–2016	Perak	50	(3)
2017	Perlis	3	(0)
2018	Marcerra Kuantan	1	(0)
2018	MOF		
2019–	Perlis	0	(0)
- * Club domestic league appearances and goals as of 18 December 2018

Mohd Syazwan Bin Mohd Roslan (born 22 March 1988) is a Malaysian footballer. His preferred position is as a defender and mainly as a right-back.

== Career ==
Syazwan started his professional career in Perak youth squad. He signed to play with Perlis FA for the 2007–2008 season. He returned to play with Perak from 2009 season, where he played until the end of 2016.
