= Fazrul Hazli =

Malaysian footballer

Personal information
- Full name: Mohd Fazrul Hazli Bin Mohd Kadri
- Date of birth: 10 July 1989 (age 37)
- Place of birth: Gerik, Perak, Malaysia
- Height: 1.70 m (5 ft 7 in)
- Position: Midfielder

Team information
- Current team: PKNP
- Number: 19

Youth career
- 2006–2008: Perak President's Cup Team

Senior career*
Years	Team	Apps	(Gls)
2009	UPB–MyTeam		
2010	KL PLUS		
2011–2012	Perak	33	(3)
2013–2014	Sime Darby	10	(5)
2015	ATM	26	(8)
2016	Perak	17	(8)
2017–2018	Felda United	11	(0)
2019–	PKNP	0	(0)

International career^{‡}
2016	Malaysia	1	(0)
- * Club domestic league appearances and goals as of 1 November 2017 ‡ National team caps and goals as of 17 November 2016

Mohd Fazrul Hazli Bin Mohd Kadri (born 10 July 1989) is a Malaysian footballer who plays for Malaysian club PKNP as a midfielder.

== Career ==
He played in the youth team of Perak, before signing for UPB-MyTeam FC in 2009. UPB-MyTeam disbanded at the end of the season, so Fazrul signed for another club, PLUS FC for the 2010 season. Unfortunately, his new club also pulled out of the Malaysian League at the end of that season due to economic reasons.

He rejoined his old team, Perak for the 2011 season, playing for the team for two seasons. After being released at the end of 2012 season, he joined Sime Darby FC along with four other former Perak players for the 2013 season.

After two seasons with Sime Darby, Fazrul joined ATM FA for the 2015 season. Fazrul Hazli then once again returned to Perak FA for the 2016 Malaysia Super League season.

== Honours ==
- PFAM Asiana.my Player of The Month for July 2016
