= Nazri Kamal =

Malaysian footballer

Personal information
- Full name: Mohd Nazri Bin Mohd Kamal
- Date of birth: 2 April 1987 (age 39)
- Place of birth: Parit, Perak, Malaysia
- Height: 1.70 m (5 ft 7 in)
- Position: Winger

Team information
- Current team: Manjung City
- Number: 25

Youth career
- 2006–2008: Perak FA President's Team

Senior career*
Years	Team	Apps	(Gls)
2008–2014	Perak	52	(9)
2015	Sarawak	12	(0)
2016	DRB-Hicom	0	(4)
2017–2018	PDRM	25	(0)
2020–	Manjung City	0	(0)
- * Club domestic league appearances and goals as of 3 March 2020

Mohd Nazri bin Mohd Kamal (born 2 April 1987) is a Malaysian footballer who plays for Manjung City in Malaysia M3 League. His preferred position is as a winger.

== Career ==
Nazri started his professional career in Perak Youth Squad. Starting from the 2009 season, he was one of several Perak youth players promoted to main squad after the exodus of Perak players to other teams. He was Perak's top scorer in the 2010 league season, with six goals.

He joined Sarawak FA for the 2015 season.
