= K. Nanthakumar =

Malaysian footballer (born 1977)

Personal information
- Full name: Nanthakumar a/l Kaliappan
- Date of birth: 13 October 1977 (age 49)
- Place of birth: Perak, Malaysia
- Height: 1.82 m (6 ft 0 in)
- Positions: Defensive midfielder; centre back

Team information
- Current team: Manjung City (head coach)

Youth career
- 1998: Perak President's Cup Team

Senior career*
Years	Team	Apps	(Gls)
1998–2004	Perak FA	89	(5)
2005	MPPJ FC	7	(0)
2006–2008	Perak FA	41	(2)
2008–2010	Selangor FA	22	(2)
2010–2012	Perak FA	31	(1)
2013	Kelantan FA	7	(0)
2014	Negeri Sembilan FA	17	(0)
2015–2017	MISC-MIFA	??	(1)

International career^{‡}
2002–2010	Malaysia	36	(0)

Managerial career
- 2024–2025: Negeri Sembilan
- 2025–: Manjung City
- * Club domestic league appearances and goals as of 28 January 2018 ‡ National team caps and goals as of 5 December 2013

Nanthakumar Kaliappan (born 13 October 1977) or better known as K. Nanthakumar is a former Malaysian footballer where he played as a defensive midfielder. He was a member of the Malaysian national team from 2002 until 2010. Nanthakumar is currently the head coach of Malaysia A1 Semi-Pro League club Manjung City.

== Playing career ==
He is renowned for his physical features in appearance wss quoted to have an overshadow which appealed many strikers in the Malaysians League. He had a six foot tall physique figure, Nanthakumar was not only tough in defence but could also score a goal for Perak FA.

He had represented Malaysia since the 2002 Tiger Cup. From then onwards, he has been a regular on the national team. He helped Malaysia to finish third in the 2004 Tiger Cup and even made a semi final appearance during the 2007 ASEAN Football Championship. Furthermore, he was chosen to be on the national team for the 2007 AFC Asian Cup, where he played in all of Malaysia's matches. He was also part of the 2006 and 2010 FIFA World Cup qualifying squad.

== Managerial career ==
=== Negeri Sembilan ===
On 15 September 2024, Nanthakumar was appointed as the head coach of Malaysia Super League club Negeri Sembilan. He later on resigned from the position as of 12 June 2025.

=== Manjung City ===
On 16 October 2025, Nanthakumar was officially announced as the new head coach of Malaysia A1 Semi-Pro League side Manjung City.

== Managerial statistics ==
As of match played 23 May 2026

Managerial record by team and tenure
Team	Nat.	From	To	Record					Ref.
Team	Nat.	From	To	G	W	D	L	Win %	Ref.
Negeri Sembilan	(Malaysia)	15 September 2024	12 June 2025	21	4	4	13	19.05	
Manjung City	(Malaysia)	16 October 2025	Present	22	12	2	8	54.55	
Career Total				43	16	6	21	37.21	

== Honours ==
=== Player ===
Perak FA

- Liga Perdana 1: 2002, 2003
- Malaysia FA Cup: 2004
- Malaysia Cup: 1998, 2000
- Piala Sumbangsih: 1999

Selangor FA

- Malaysia Super League: 2009
- Malaysia FA Cup: 2009
- Piala Sumbangsih: 2009

MISC-MIFA

- Malaysia FAM Cup: 2016
