= Muhammad Shafiq Jamal =

Malaysian footballer

Shafiq Jamal
Personal information
- Full name: Muhammad Shafiq Bin Jamal
- Date of birth: 12 December 1987 (age 38)
- Place of birth: Jitra, Kedah, Malaysia
- Height: 1.70 m (5 ft 7 in)
- Position: Forward

Youth career
- 2005–2006: Kedah U-21

Senior career*
Years	Team	Apps	(Gls)
2006–2010	Kedah	?	(5)
2011–2012	Perak	27	(8)
2013–2014	Sime Darby	?	(3)
2015	Sabah	8	(1)
2016	PDRM	7	(1)

International career^{‡}
2004–2006	Malaysia U-20		
- * Club domestic league appearances and goals as of 1 August 2016 ‡ National team caps and goals as of 16 June 2016

Muhammad Shafiq Bin Jamal (born 12 December 1987, in Jitra, Kedah) is a Malaysian footballer.

== Biography ==
Shafiq was recruited from Bukit Jalil Sports School. He was in the Kedah Malaysia President Cup squad and was SUKMA 2006 silver medalist with Kedah. He was promoted to the senior team for season 2006/07.

From the 2011 season he joined Perak due to limited opportunities he had during his time with Kedah. He played with Perak for two seasons, before being released at the end of the 2012 season. He joined Sime Darby FC, along with four other former Perak players, for the 2013 season.

After playing with Sime Darby for 2 season, he moved to Sabah. He joined PDRM for the 2016 season. However, after testing positive for banned substance during a Super League match with Perak, Shafiq was banned from football-related matters for two years, together with Firdaus Saiyadi from Perak for the same offence.

He also a former member of the Malaysia U-20 squad from 2004 until 2006. At the 2005 AFF U-20 Youth Championship, Shafiq score a braces in a 3-1 win against Thailand. In the match against Brunei, he scored 6 goals as Malaysia beat Brunei 12-0.
