= Norizan Bakar =

Malaysian footballer

Personal information
- Full name: Norizan bin Bakar
- Date of birth: January 27, 1961 (age 65)
- Place of birth: Perlis, Malaysia
- Position: Midfielder

Team information
- Current team: Felcra F.C. (Director of Football)

Senior career*
Years	Team	Apps	(Gls)
1978–1989	Perlis FA		

Managerial career
- 2003–2004: Perlis FA
- 2005: Penang FA
- 2005–2006: Malaysia U-23
- 2005–2007: Malaysia
- 2008: Kelantan FA
- 2011–2012: Perak FA
- * Club domestic league appearances and goals

Norizan bin Bakar (born 27 January 1961 in Kampung Datuk Kaya Man, Perlis) is a former Malaysian football player. He currently the Director of Football for Felcra F.C.

== Club career ==
Norizan played for his home state Perlis in semi-pro league from 1978 until 1989. His main achievement as a player was a Division Two title in 1989 with Perlis FA.

== Coaching career ==
=== Perlis FA and Penang FA ===
Norizan started his coaching career with his own former team Perlis FA. He also had a stint with Penang FA.

With Perlis, he won the Malaysia Cup in 2004 as well as the Malaysia FA Cup runner-up in 2003.

=== Malaysia ===
After Bertalan Bicskei relieved of his duties as the head coach of the Malaysia national football team, Norizan was appointed as his successor by Football Association of Malaysia in September 2005. He was also appointed as head coach of Malaysia national under-23 football team, until 2006.

Early in his reign, the Malaysia U-23 squad achieved Manila 2005 SEA Games bronze medal, and the senior team also emerges as ASEAN Football Championship semifinalists in 2007.

However, in the 2007 AFC Asian Cup, which Malaysia qualified as co-hosts, Norizan had his worst results as a coach. The Malaysian team was hammered 5–1 against China and 5–0 against Uzbekistan; only a 2–0 loss against Iran was considered a respectable score. After the defeat against Uzbekistan, Norizan was sacked, although he was still in charge for the final group match against Iran.

The poor showing by the Malaysia national team at the Asian Cup and the criticism from the Malaysia fans and medias also led to a mass resignation of the upper echelons of Football Association of Malaysia (FAM) including the deputy president, Tengku Abdullah ibni Sultan Ahmad Shah.

=== Kelantan FA and Perak FA ===
In 2008, Norizan became the manager for Kelantan FA. Due to family problems, he resigned from his position as Kelantan FA's coach at the end of the season.

He was appointed head coach of Perak FA in October 2010. In his first season with Perak, the team achieved 6th place in the league, a vast improvement from 11th place of the previous season. His second season with Perak brought mixed fortunes. Although the team ended the league at an improved 4th place, he had criticism from the fans over his tactics and players chosen, in particular import striker Lazar Popovic who only scored once in 14 matches. A heavy 6–0 defeat by Kelantan FA on 7 July in the league seals Norizan's fate, Perak relieved him of his duties soon after, his job taken over by his assistant Chong Yee Fat for the remainder of the league games, and Jang Jung for the season-ending 2012 Malaysia Cup competition.

== Personal life ==
Norizan was also known by his nickname 'Cikgu Jan'. The nickname (Cikgu meaning 'Teacher' in Malay, and Jan is a diminutive form of Norizan), stems from his background as a former school teacher.
