= Shahrulnizam Mustapa =

Malaysian footballer (born 1981)

Personal information
- Full name: Shahrulnizam bin Mustapa
- Date of birth: 2 April 1981 (age 45)
- Place of birth: Ipoh, Perak, Malaysia
- Height: 1.73 m (5 ft 8 in)
- Position: Midfielder

Team information
- Current team: Perak FA (assistant coach)

Youth career
- 1999: Perak FA (President's Cup)

Senior career*
Years	Team	Apps	(Gls)
2001	PDRM FA	16	(1)
2002–2008	Perak FA		
2009–2010	Kedah FA	32	(4)
2011–2013	Perak FA	35	(3)
2014–2015	Felda United	18	(0)
2016	Felcra	1	(0)

International career
2004	Malaysia U-23	3	(0)
2007–2011	Malaysia	6	(0)
- * Club domestic league appearances and goals

Shahrulnizam bin Mustapa (born 2 April 1981), popularly known as Coach Arul, is a Malaysian football coach and former professional footballer who played as a midfielder.

Shahrulnizam spent the majority of his playing career with Perak, whom he also captained, while also having prominent domestic stints with Kedah and Felda United before concluding his playing career at Felcra. At the international level, he represented the Malaysia national team between 2007 and 2011. He has since transitioned into professional coaching.

== Club career ==
=== PDRM FA ===
Shahrulnizam began his professional football career with PDRM FA in 2001. After spending a single season with the club, he returned to his home state to play for Perak ahead of the 2002 season.

=== Perak FA ===
Following his return, Shahrulnizam became an integral part of the Perak FA squad that captured consecutive Malaysia Premier League titles in 2002 and 2003. He eventually went on to captain the senior side during his initial seven-year stint with the club.

=== Kedah FA ===
On 17 October 2008, Shahrulnizam transferred to Kedah FA after being recruited by head coach Mohd Azraai Khor Abdullah. Brought in to occupy a box-to-box midfield role following the departure of Nelson San Martín, he was assigned the number 8 shirt, a jersey number previously worn by Kedah's long-serving foreign defender Cornelius Huggins.

== National team ==
Shahrulnizam represented Malaysia at the international level, earning his first senior cap in a match against Cambodia on 18 June 2007. Later that year, he was named to Malaysia's squad for the 2007 AFC Asian Cup, where he featured in all three group stage matches during the tournament.

== Coaching career ==
=== Perak FC ===
Following his retirement as a player, Shahrulnizam transitioned into coaching. In August 2021, he was appointed as the temporary assistant coach for Perak FC to support interim manager Mohd Shahril Nizam Khalil, who had taken charge following the departure of Chong Yee Fatt. He was later integrated permanently into the senior team's backroom coaching staff under head coach Yusri Che Lah, serving as an assistant coach through the 2022 and 2023 seasons as the club navigated a heavy transitional phase.

=== Perak FA State Team ===
Ahead of the 2025–26 season, Shahrulnizam joined the coaching panel of the newly revived Perak FA as an assistant coach under former teammate and head coach Syamsul Saad, competing in the second-tier Malaysia A1 Semi-Pro League.

The coaching duo achieved significant national prominence in January 2026 when they guided the semi-professional state team to a historic upset in the Malaysia Cup. In the first leg of the Round of 16, Perak FA defied the odds by defeating top-tier Malaysia Super League giants Kuala Lumpur City F.C. 2–0 at the Manjung Municipal Council Stadium, earning widespread praise for their tactical setup and the development of local grassroots talent.
