= Perak F.C. =

Association football club in Malaysia

Perak
- Full name: Perak Football Club; Kelab Bola Sepak Perak
- Nicknames: Seladang (The Gaurs); The Bos Gaurus
- Short name: PFC
- Founded: 1921; 105 years ago (as PAFA)
- Dissolved: 2025; 1 year ago
- Ground: Perak Stadium
- Capacity: 42,500
- Owner: XOX Berhad
- Chairman: Abdul Azim bin Mohd Zabidi
- Head coach: Yusri Che Lah
- 2024–25: Malaysia Super League, 7th of 13 (dissolved)
Home colours	Away colours

Perak Football Club was a professional football club based in Ipoh, Perak, Malaysia. Founded in 1921, it was one of the oldest football clubs in the country and last competed in the Malaysia Super League. Formerly overseen by the Perak Football Association, the club turned professional in 1994 and was privatised in 2021. Known as The Bos Gaurus, Perak played its home matches at Perak Stadium until its dissolution in 2025.

== History ==
Although a Perak football team had competed as early as 1921 — particularly in the Malaya Cup, the predecessor to the Malaysia Cup — the Perak Football Association (PAFA) was only formally established on 18 April 1951 to oversee football development in the state.

In 1957, Perak became the first team to lift the Malaysia Cup at the Merdeka Stadium. In 1964, it featured in the first Malaysia Cup final to be broadcast live on television, though it lost 2–3 to Singapore.

Perak turned semi-professional in 1989 and later went professional in 1994. Notably, the state team remained under the purview of the PFA even after professionalisation.

It held the distinction of being the last state team never to be relegated from the top tier until 2021, when it was relegated for the first time in its history.

In November 2021, private broker company IMC was announced as caretaker owner of the club. This marked the start of a transitional period in which the team moved toward privatisation. In August 2022, XOX Bhd completed a full takeover of the club through its subsidiary XOX Pro Sport Sdn Bhd.

However, the venture was short-lived. Because of their serious financial problems, Perak FC decided to not applying the national club licence from the Malaysian Football League for the 2025–26 season and the club was officially dissolved in 2025.

== Dissolution (2025) ==
Following years of financial instability under the ownership of XOX Berhad, Perak FC chairman Datuk Seri Azim Zabidi confirmed on 27 April 2025 that the club would withdraw from the 2025–26 Malaysia Super League. The club failed to meet the National Licensing requirements set by the Malaysian Football League (MFL) due to significant salary arrears and debts. Consequently, the club was officially dissolved in mid-2025, marking the end of its 104-year legacy as a professional entity.

== Successor: Perak FA state football team ==
Following the collapse of the privatized Perak FC, the Perak Football Association (PAFA) revived the Perak FA state football team (formerly the amateur arm) to ensure the state remained represented in the Malaysian league system. For the 2025–26 Malaysia A1 Semi-Pro League, the team was registered as an amateur-status developmental squad.

Under head coach Syamsul Saad, the revived Perak FA gained national prominence in January 2026 as "Giant-Killers" after defeating Super League side Kuala Lumpur City F.C. 2–0 in the first leg of the 2025–26 Malaysia Cup Round of 16. The squad currently features experienced winger Wan Zack Haikal and a trio of Nigerian imports: Aliyu Abubakar, Christian Chukwu, and Ekene Victor Emewulu.

== Rivalries ==
Perak shares a long-standing rivalry with Selangor, often referred to as the Malayan El Clasico. This rivalry dates back to the early days of the Malaya Cup (now Malaysia Cup) in the 1920s.

Perak also has rivalries with its northern region counterparts Kedah Darul Aman and Penang. Matches with these teams are often referred to as the Northern Derby.

== Players (2024) ==
=== First-team squad ===
Note: Flags indicate national team as defined under FIFA eligibility rules; some limited exceptions apply. Players may hold more than one non-FIFA nationality.

No.	Pos.	Nation	Player
1	GK	MAS	Firdaus Irman
2	MF	NGR	Sunday Afolabi
3	DF	MAS	Tommy Mawat Bada
4	DF	BRA	Luiz Henrique
6	MF	MAS	Azfar Fikri
7	FW	BRA	Clayton
8	DF	MAS	Shivan Pillay
11	FW	MAS	Wan Zack Haikal (vice-captain)
12	DF	MAS	Afif Asyraf
14	MF	MAS	Firdaus Saiyadi
16	MF	MAS	Fadhil Idris
17	MF	KGZ	Adilet Kanybekov
20	GK	MAS	Haziq Nadzli (on loan from Johor Darul Ta’zim)
21	DF	MAS	Kamal Arif
22	GK	MAS	Ramadhan Hamid

No.	Pos.	Nation	Player
23	FW	MAS	Alif Zikri
26	DF	MAS	Nik Umar
27	MF	MAS	Firdaus Fuad
28	MF	MAS	Ariff Ar-Rasyid
31	DF	MAS	Hafizy Daniel
32	DF	MAS	Fadhil Azmi
33	FW	MAS	Syahmi Shamsudin
34	MF	MAS	Akmal Hazim
35	MF	MAS	Daniel Hakimi
36	MF	MAS	Farid Danish
37	DF	MAS	Che Mohamad Suhairi
39	MF	MAS	Farris Izdiham
40	DF	MAS	Aiman Khairul Yusni
41	MF	MAS	Afifin Arfa
42	GK	MAS	Syazwan Syazani

== Coaching staff (2023) ==
Position	Name
Team manager	(Malaysia) Nurmaulan Mohd Said
Head coach	(Malaysia) Yusri Che Lah
Assistant coaches	(Malaysia) V. Saravanan, (Malaysia) Shahrulnizam Mustapa, (Malaysia) Muhammad Azim Abdul Rahim
Goalkeeping coach	(Malaysia) Mohd Azlen Ahmad Jabri
Fitness coach	(Malaysia) Sam Pakiaraj
Team doctors	(Malaysia) Cheng Wern Loong, (Malaysia) Ahmad Hazwan Ahmad Shushami
Physiotherapists	(Malaysia) Muhammad Rozairen Hairudin, (Malaysia) Mohd Noradam Mohd Azam
Masseur	(Malaysia) Muhammad Shaffiq Mokhtar
Kitmen	(Malaysia) Mohd Azzan Shah Azman Shah, (Malaysia) Mohd Suhaimi Mohd Abidin
Security	(Malaysia) Mohd Nasha Bunari
Media officers	(Malaysia) Faidzal Shahril Alang Abdul Rahman, (Malaysia) Zubir Shaharani

== Stadium ==
Perak FC's home ground was the Perak Stadium. Perak TBG used the alternative Lumut Stadium. In September 2017, the construction of a new training ground was announced. Originally scheduled for completion in February 2018, the training ground dubbed the Perak Football Complex, was eventually completed in 2020.

== Coat of arms and colours ==
Crest of Perak FA (1921–2015)

=== Coat of Arms of Perak FA (1921–2015) ===
Perak has historically utilised one primary coat of arms (CoA). The first, adopted when the club was founded, was the image of a Malayan Tiger, where it is famous in Malaya and remained for more than half-century. In 2015, in effort to modernise the club, a new coat of arms was introduced to replace the old arms as the club main coat of arms. The club replaced the old coat of arms with new logo and adopted the image Seladang which is more synonym with the Perak football team. After being criticized for the lack of quality for the logo, Perak The Bos Gaurus launched a new version of the logo chosen from the logo competition held by the team for 2016 season onwards. Perak reused previous coat of arms for 2019 season for all competitions until 2020 season.

=== Coat of Arms of Perak The Bos Gaurus (2016–2018) ===
Perak The Bos Gaurus have always worn yellow with a bit of black or white colour shirts as their home kit as it is an iconic colour for the club.

Perak The Bos Gaurus's away colours are usually white and black or various combination colours of white, yellow and black as it represent the colour of Perak's Flag.

== Supporters ==
Perak TBG was one of the most widely supported football clubs in Perak. Perak TBG's traditional fanbase come from 11 districts in Perak. Silver State Ultras (SSU) was a supporter club founded in April 2009.

== Head coaches ==
There have been 16 coaches of Perak Darul Ridzuan Football Association since the appointment of the club's first professional coach, Dato' M. Karathu in 1989. The most successful coach of Perak Darul Ridzuan Football Association is Toni Netto from Brazil who had achieved 4 trophies.

Name	Period	Trophies										Total
Name	Period	Domestic					International					Total
Name	Period	SLC	PLC	MC	CS	FAC	ACL	UCWC	UC	USC	IC	Total
(Malaysia) Abdullah Yeop Noordin	1989	—	—	—			—	—	—	—	—	0
(Malaysia) M. Karathu	1989–90, 2001, 2008–09	—	—	—	1	1	—	—	—	—	—	2
(Croatia) Marco Bilic	1991	—	—	—	—	—	—	—	—	—	—	0
(Malaysia) Chan Sze Onn	1992	—	—	—	—	—	—	—	—	—	—	0
(Czechoslovakia) Milous Kvacek	1993–94	—	—	—	—	—	—	—	—	—	—	0
(England) Ken Shellito	1995	—	—	—	—	—	—	—	—	—	—	0
(Malaysia) Khaidir Buyong	1996	—	—	—	—	—	—	—	—	—	—	0
(Germany) Karl Heinz Weigang	1997–99, 1999, 2000	—	—	2	1	—	—	—	—	—	—	3
(Malaysia) Chow Kwai Lam	1999	—	—		—	—	—	—	—	—	—	0
(Germany) Torsten Spittler	2000	—	—	—	—	—	—	—	—	—	—	0
(Brazil) Toni Netto	2002–05	2	—	—	1	1	—	—	—	—	—	4
(England) Steve Darby	2005–08	—	—	—	2	—	—	—	—	—	—	2
(Malaysia) M. Karathu	2009–10	—	—	—	—	—	—	—	—	—	—	0
(Malaysia) Raja Azlan Shah Raja So'ib	2010–11	—	—	—	—	—	—	—	—	—	—	0
(Malaysia) Norizan Bakar	2011–12	—	—	—	—	—	—	—	—	—	—	0
(South Korea) Jang Jung	2012	—	—	—	—	—	—	—	—	—	—	0
(Malaysia) Mohd Azraai Khor Abdullah	2013	—	—	—	—	—	—	—	—	—	—	0
(Malaysia) Abu Bakar Fadzim	2014	—	—	—	—	—	—	—	—	—	—	0
(Croatia) Vjeran Simunic	Sept 2014 – Jan 2015	—	—	—	—	—	—	—	—	—	—	0
(Malaysia) M. Karathu	Jan 2015 – Aug 2015	—	—	—	—	—	—	—	—	—	—	0
(Croatia) Vjeran Simunic	Sept 2015 – Nov 2015	—	—	—	—	—	—	—	—	—	—	0
(Malaysia) Syamsul Saad	Nov 2015 – May 2016	—	—	—	—	—	—	—	—	—	—	0
(Germany) Karl-Heinz Weigang	May 2016 – Feb 2017	—	—	—	—	—	—	—	—	—	—	0
(Australia) Mehmet Durakovic	Feb 2017 – Feb 2021	—	—	1	—	—	—	—	—	—	—	1
(Malaysia) Chong Yee Fatt	Feb 2021 – Aug 2021	—	—	—	—	—	—	—	—	—	—	0
(Malaysia) Yusri Che Lah	Dec 2021 – Sept 2022	—	—	—	—	—	—	—	—	—	—	0
(Malaysia) Lim Teong Kim	Sept 2022 – May 2023	—	—	—	—	—	—	—	—	—	—	0
(Malaysia) Yusri Che Lah	Oct 2023 – May 2025	—	—	—	—	—	—	—	—	—	—	0
Total	1989–23	2	0	3	5	2	0	0	0	0	0	12

=== Managers ===
Years	Name	Nationality
1992–1993	Safri Nawawi	Malaysia
1998–2000	Raja Ahmad Zainuddin Raja Omar	Malaysia
2001–06	Jamal Nasir Rasdi	Malaysia
2007–08	Mohammed Mahiyuddin Abdullah	Malaysia
2008–10	Nor Azli Musa	Malaysia
2011–13	Khairul Azwan Harun	Malaysia
2014	Azhar Ahmad	Malaysia
November 2014	Shahrul Zaman Yahya	Malaysia
Nov 2015	Shahrul Zaman Yahya	Malaysia
Nov 2015	Jamal Mohd Aris	Malaysia
2017–2018	Ahmad Shahrul Azhar Sofian	Malaysia
2019–2020	Adly Shah Ahmad Tah	Malaysia
2021	Rizal Naizali	Malaysia

== Continental record ==
Season	Competition	Round	Club	Home	Away	Aggregate
1969	Asian Champion Club Tournament	Group B	(Hong Kong) Kowloon Motor Bus	6–2		4th out of 5
1969	Asian Champion Club Tournament	Group B	(Iran) Persepolis	2–4		4th out of 5
1969	Asian Champion Club Tournament	Group B	(Israel) Maccabi Tel Aviv	1–1		4th out of 5
1969	Asian Champion Club Tournament	Group B	(Japan) Toyo Kogyo	0–2		4th out of 5
1971	Asian Champion Club Tournament	Group A	(Kuwait) Al Arabi	0–3		4th out of 4
1971	Asian Champion Club Tournament	Group A	(South Korea) ROK Army	0–3		4th out of 4
1971	Asian Champion Club Tournament	Group A	(Iran) Taj Tehran	0–3		4th out of 4
2003	ASEAN Club Championship	Group B	Singapore Armed Forces	2–0		1st out of 3
2003	ASEAN Club Championship	Group B	(Brunei) DPMM FC	3–0		1st out of 3
2003	ASEAN Club Championship	Quarter Final	(Cambodia) Samart United	2–0		
2003	ASEAN Club Championship	Semi Final	(Thailand) BEC Tero Sasana	1–3		
2003	ASEAN Club Championship	3rd Place Playoff	(Indonesia) Petrokimia Putra	0–3		
2004	AFC Cup	Group D	(Maldives) Club Valencia	2–0	1–0	2nd out of 4
2004	AFC Cup	Group D	(Hong Kong) Happy Valley	2–1	2–1	2nd out of 4
2004	AFC Cup	Group D	(Singapore) Home United	2–2	2–2	2nd out of 4
2004	AFC Cup	Quarter Final	(Singapore) Geylang United	1–2	2–3	3–5
2005	AFC Cup	Group D	(Singapore) Tampines Rovers	2–1	2–4	4th out of 4
2005	AFC Cup	Group D	(Maldives) Club Valencia	1–2	1–1	4th out of 4
2005	AFC Cup	Group D	(Hong Kong) Sun Hei	0–1	1–2	4th out of 4
2019	AFC Champions League	Preliminary Round 2	(Hong Kong) Kitchee	1–1 (a.e.t.) (6–5 p)		
2019	AFC Champions League	Play-off round	(South Korea) Ulsan Hyundai	1–5		

== Honours ==
=== Domestic competitions ===
==== League ====
- Malaysian League / Malaysian Semi-Pro Football League Division I / Malaysia Premier League / Malaysia Premier League 1 / Malaysia Super League
  - Winners (2): 2002, 2003
  - Runners-up (2): 2006–07, 2018
- Malaysian Semi-Pro Football League Division II / Malaysia Premier League 2 / Malaysia Premier League
  - Runners-up (1): 1989

==== Cup ====
- Malaysia FA Cup
  - Winners (2): 1990, 2004
  - Runners-up (4): 1991, 2002, 2005, 2019
- Malaysia Cup
  - Winners (8): 1926, 1931, 1957, 1967, 1970, 1998, 2000, 2018
  - Runners-up (11): 1923, 1951, 1959, 1960, 1961, 1964, 1971, 1972, 1974, 2001, 2007
- Malaysian Charity Shield
  - Winners (3): 1999, 2005, 2006
  - Runners-up (2): 2001, 2019

=== Preseason competitions ===
- Unity Shield
  - Winners (1): 2020
  - Runners-up (1): 2019
- Federal Territory Minister Cup
  - Runners-up (1): 2023

== Club records ==
Updated on 19 October 2023 (Malaysian football league was established in 1982).

Note:

Pld = Played, W = Won, D = Drawn, L = Lost, F = Goals for, A = Goals against, Pts= Points, Pos = Position

1st or Champions 2nd or Runner-up 3rd place Promotion Relegation

Season	League									Cup				Asia	
Season	Division	Pld	W	D	L	F	A	Pts	Pos	FA	Malaysia	Challenge	Charity	Competition	Result
1982	M-League	15	–	–	–	–	–	–	13th	Not Introduced Yet	DNQ to Quarter Final	–	–	–	–
1983	M-League	15	1	3	11	18	38	6	15th	Not Introduced Yet	DNQ to Quarter Final	–	–	–	–
1984	M-League	15	3	7	5	14	20	16	12th	Not Introduced Yet	DNQ to Quarter Final	–	–	–	–
1985	M-League	15	6	3	6	24	27	21	9th	Not Introduced Yet	DNQ to Quarter Final	–	–	–	–
1986	M-League	15	5	0	10	21	38	15	13th	Not Introduced Yet	DNQ to Quarter Final	–	–	–	–
1987	M-League	16	4	5	7	22	31	17	11th	Not Introduced Yet	DNQ to Quarter Final	–	–	–	–
1988	M-League	16	6	3	7	25	34	21	12th	Not Introduced Yet	DNQ to Quarter Final	–	–	–	–
1989	Semi-Pro League Division 2	14	8	2	4	25	12	26	2nd	Not Introduced Yet	Semi-final	–	–	–	–
1990	Semi-Pro League Division 1	18	10	4	4	20	14	24	3rd	Champion	Semi-final	–	–	–	–
1991	Semi-Pro League Division 1	18	8	4	6	29	25	20	3rd	Runner-Up	Group stage	–	–	–	–
1992	Semi-Pro League Division 1	18	4	9	5	23	21	17	6th	Quarter-Final	Group stage	–	–	–	–
1993	Semi-Pro League Division 1	18	9	7	2	22	12	34	3rd	Quarter-Final	Group stage	–	–	–	–
1994	Liga Perdana	28	10	5	13	45	46	35	10th	2nd round	Group stage	–	–	–	–
1995	Liga Perdana	28	12	4	12	27	29	40	7th	2nd round	Group stage	–	–	–	–
1996	Liga Perdana	28	9	13	6	29	24	40	8th	Quarter-finals	Group stage	–	–	–	–
1997	Liga Perdana	28	12	5	11	51	41	41	8th	2nd round	Group stage	–	–	–	–
1998	Liga Perdana 1	22	8	5	9	27	24	29	7th	Quarter-finals	Champion	–	–	–	–
1999	Liga Perdana 1	18	6	5	6	22	31	23	9th	2nd round	Group stage	–	Champions	–	–
2000	Liga Perdana 1	22	11	5	6	33	21	38	3rd	Quarter-finals	Champion	–	–	–	–
2001	Liga Perdana 1	22	8	5	9	38	34	29	7th	Quarter-finals	Runner-up	–	Runner-up	–	–
2002	Liga Perdana 1	26	19	3	4	42	15	60	1st	Runner-up	Semi-finals	–	–	–	–
2003	Liga Perdana 1	24	13	8	3	38	22	47	1st	Quarter-finals	Semi-finals	–	–	–	–
2004	Super League	21	10	6	5	35	27	36	4th	Champions	Group stage	–	–	AFC Cup	Quarter-finals
2005	Super League	21	9	3	9	33	25	30	3rd	Runner-up	Semi-finals	–	Champions	AFC Cup	Group stage
2005–06	Super League	21	9	3	9	32	29	30	3rd	Quarter-finals	Semi-finals	–	Champions	–	–
2006–07	Super League	24	16	5	3	58	22	53	2nd	2nd round	Runner-up	–	–	–	–
2007–08	Super League	24	13	2	9	46	34	41	5th	2nd round	Quarter-finals	–	–	AFC Cup	Quarter-finals
2009	Super League	26	9	5	12	27	36	32	10th	Quarter-finals	Group stage	–	–	–	–
2010	Super League	26	8	6	12	25	30	30	11th	2nd round	Group stage	–	–	–	–
2011	Super League	26	10	10	6	31	24	40	6th	Quarter-finals	Quarter-finals	–	–	–	–
2012	Super League	26	13	3	10	40	43	42	4th	2nd round	Group stage	–	–	–	–
2013	Super League	22	8	5	9	23	27	29	7th	1st round	Group stage	–	–	–	–
2014	Super League	22	8	2	12	22	27	26	9th	1st round	Group stage	–	–	–	–
2015	Super League	22	8	4	10	32	33	28	8th	Quarter-finals	Group stage	–	–	–	–
2016	Super League	22	7	7	8	29	30	28	6th	Semi-finals	Group stage	–	–	–	–
2017	Super League	22	9	7	6	30	31	34	5th	3rd round	Semi-finals	–	–	–	–
2018	Super League	22	10	6	6	35	27	36	2nd	Quarter-finals	Champions	–	–	–	–
2019	Super League	22	8	9	5	36	31	33	5th	Runner-up	Quarter-finals	–	Runner-up	AFC Champions League	Play-off round
2020	Super League	11	5	3	3	21	19	18	4th	Cancelled (Note: Cancelled due to the COVID-19 pandemic.)		–	–	–	–
2021	Super League	22	4	4	14	20	45	16	11th	Cancelled	Group Stage	–	–	–	–
2022	Premier League	18	5	2	11	16	30	8	9th	2nd Round	DNQ	–	–	–	–
2023	Super League	23	6	4	13	25	47	22	9th	1st round	Semi-finals	–	–	–	–

== Individual player awards ==
Favourite Striker Award

Season	Player
2006–07	(Malaysia) Muhamad Khalid Jamlus

Overall Favourite Player Award

Season	Player
2006–07	(Malaysia) Kaliappan Nanthakumar

M-League Golden Boots – Top Goalscorer Overall

Season	Player	Goals
1997	(Hungary) László Répási	19
2001	(Malaysia) Norizam Ali Hassan	13
2002	(Malaysia) Muhamad Khalid Jamlus	17
2005–06	(Guinea) Keita Mandjou	17
2006–07	(Guinea) Keita Mandjou	21

M-League Perak FA's League Top Goalscorer

Season	Player	Goals
1995	(Australia) Marshall Soper	11
1996	(Ivory Coast) Noel Dodo Kipee	13
1997	(Hungary) László Répási	19
1998	(Hungary) László Répási	8
1999	(Malaysia) Azrul Amri Burhan	6
1999	(Malaysia) M.Nagaraja	6
2000	(Malaysia) Muhamad Khalid Jamlus	7
2001	(Malaysia) Norizam Ali Hassan	13
2002	(Malaysia) Muhamad Khalid Jamlus	17
2003	(Malaysia) Muhamad Khalid Jamlus	9
2004	(Liberia) Frank Seator	14
2005	(Guinea) Keita Mandjou	11
2006	(Guinea) Keita Mandjou	17
2007	(Guinea) Keita Mandjou	21
2008	(Chile) Carlos Arturo Caceres	17
2009	(Malaysia) Razali Umar Kandasamy	13
2010	(Malaysia) Mohd Nazri Mohd Kamal	6
2011	(Malaysia) Akmal Rizal Ahmad Rakhli	9
2012	(Slovakia) Michal Kubala	13
2013	(Brazil) Paulo Rangel	11
2014	(Nigeria) Abdulafees Abdulsalam	5
2014	(Montenegro) Milan Purović	5
2015	(Brazil) Charles Chad	9
2015	(South Korea) Namkung Woong	9
2016	(Brazil) Elias Fernandes	9
2017	(Palestine) Yashir Pinto	6
2018	(Brazil) Gilmar Filho	11
2019	(Brazil) Careca	7
2020	(Malaysia) Shahrel Fikri	10
2021	(Ghana) Nana Poku	5
2022	(Argentina) Luciano Guaycochea	2
2022	(Malaysia) Farid Khazali	2
2022	(Malaysia) Hakimi Mat Isa	2
2022	(Malaysia) Nazmi Ahmad	2
2022	(Malaysia) Wan Zack Haikal	2
2023	(South Korea) Seo Seonung	7

== All-time top goalscorer ==
As of 21 July 2020

#	Name	Years	League	FA Cup	Malaysia Cup	Charity Cup	AFC Cup	Total
1	(Malaysia) Muhamad Khalid Jamlus	1999–2004, 2007–2008	78	14	35	0	5	132
2	(Guinea) Keita Mandjou	2004–2007	49	12	14	4	2	81
3	(Liberia) Frank Seator	2003–2005	26	12	12	0	6	64

== Club captains history ==
Years	Name	Nationality
1985–1994	Azizol Abu Haniffah	Malaysia
1995–1997	Raja Azlan Shah Raja So'ib	Malaysia
1998–1999	Roslan Hamid	Malaysia
2000–2008	Shahrul Azhar	Malaysia
2009–2010	S. Subramaniam	Malaysia
2010–2011	K. Nanthakumar	Malaysia
2011–2013	Shahrulnizam Mustapa	Malaysia
2014–2016	Nasir Basharudin	Malaysia
2017	Shahrom Kalam	Malaysia
2018	Nasir Basharudin	Malaysia
2019–2021	Shahrul Saad	Malaysia
2021	Hafizul Hakim	Malaysia
2022	Indra Putra Mahayuddin	Malaysia
2023	Hafizal Mohamad	Malaysia
2023-2025	Luciano Guaycochea	Argentina

== Presidential history ==
Years	Name
1957–1972	Teoh Chye Hinn
1999–2006	DYTM Raja Dr. Nazrin Shah ibni Sultan Azlan Muhibbuddin Shah
2008–2010	Mohamad Nizar Jamaluddin
2010–September 2015	Zainol Fadzi Paharudin
September 2015–August 2018	Abdul Puhat Mat Nayan
August 2018–October 2018	Hasnul Zulkarnain Abdul Munaim
November 2018–January 2021	Ahmad Faizal Azumu
December 2021–	Mohd Azhar Jamaluddin

== See also ==
- Perak FA President and Youth
- Perak F.C. II
