= List of Malaysian football transfers 2012 =

This is a list of Malaysian football transfers for the 2012 transfer window. Only moves featuring at least one team in the Malaysia Super League and Malaysia Premier League is listed.

== ATM FA ==
=== In ===
Note: Flags indicate national team as defined under FIFA eligibility rules; some limited exceptions apply. Players may hold more than one non-FIFA nationality.

No.	Pos.	Nation	Player
—	GK	Malaysia	Mohd Farizal Harun (from Negeri Sembilan FA)
—	DF	Malaysia	Mohd Aidil Zafuan Abdul Radzak (from Negeri Sembilan FA)
—	DF	Malaysia	Irwan Fadzli Idrus (from Negeri Sembilan FA)
—	MF	Malaysia	K. Reuben (from Selangor FA)
—	MF	Malaysia	Rezal Zambery Yahya (from Johor FC)
—	FW	Malaysia	Hairuddin Omar (from Negeri Sembilan FA)
—	FW	Malaysia	Mohd Zaquan Adha (from Negeri Sembilan FA)
—	MF	Malaysia	D. Christie Jayaseelan (from PKNS FC)
—	DF	Malaysia	Amirizwan Taj Tajuddin (from UiTM FC)
—	DF	Malaysia	Mohd Azmi Muslim (from Kedah FA)
—	MF	Malaysia	Danial Fadzly Abdullah (from Kelantan FA)
—	DF	Malaysia	A. Varathan (from Sime Darby FC)
—	GK	Malaysia	Mohamad Hafizzudin Azuhar (from Free agent)
—	GK	Malaysia	Kamarul Ashraf Kamarudin (from Perlis FA)

No.	Pos.	Nation	Player
—	MF	Malaysia	Mohammad Alif Mohd Daud (from Free agent)
—	GK	Malaysia	Muhammad Aizuddin Ismail (from Free agent)
—	MF	Malaysia	Mohd Fitri Omar (from Muar Municipal Council FC)
—	FW	Saint Vincent and the Grenadines	Marlon Alex James (from Free agent)
—	MF	Argentina	Bruno Martelotto (from Santiago Morning)
—	FW	Malaysia	Mohd Rahmad Ahmad (from SDMS Kepala Batas FC)
—	GK	Malaysia	Mohd Azrul Hafiz Amran (from Selangor FA)
—	DF	Malaysia	Shahrul Hasnizam Mohd Halim (from Perak FA)
—	DF	Malaysia	Mohd Fithri Mohd Rasid (from Perak FA)
—	MF	Malaysia	Syafiq Azri Ahmad Kamal (from Selangor FA)
—	FW	Malaysia	Mohd Norazuan Mohd Ariffin (from Perak FA)
—	MF	Malaysia	Muhd Izaire Mohd Radzi (from Rapid KL FC)

=== Out ===
Note: Flags indicate national team as defined under FIFA eligibility rules; some limited exceptions apply. Players may hold more than one non-FIFA nationality.

No.	Pos.	Nation	Player
—	FW	Malaysia	Mohd Fauzzi Kassim (to Johor FA)
—	FW	Malaysia	Fatrurazi Rozi (to Pos Malaysia FC)
—	DF	Malaysia	Mohd Ihsan Ibrahim Din (to Release)
—	DF	Malaysia	Chun Keng Hong (to Chanthaburi F.C.)
—	DF	Malaysia	Zainudin Abidin (to PBAPP FC)
—	DF	Malaysia	Fahrul Nizwan Abdul Nasir (to PKNS FC)
—	MF	Malaysia	Fairuz Montana Zainal Abidin (to Release)
—	MF	Malaysia	Ashadi Yusoff (to Johor FA)
—	FW	Malaysia	Efendi Abdul Malek (to MP Muar FC)
—	MF	Malaysia	Suhaidi Akmal Mohd Nor (to Chanthaburi F.C.)
—	GK	Malaysia	Mohd Khairul Nizam Hassan (to TLDM FC)

No.	Pos.	Nation	Player
—	DF	Malaysia	Musabri Mat Nayan (to Tentera Darat FC)
—	DF	Malaysia	Mohd Zahari Zaini (to Release)
—	MF	Malaysia	Muhd Syafiq Abdul Samad (to Perlis FA)
—	DF	Malaysia	Khairul Iskandar Ismail (to Chanthaburi F.C.)
—	FW	Malaysia	Abdul Aziz Ramli (to Release)
—	DF	Malaysia	Muhd Zamri Yusuf (to Release)
—	GK	Malaysia	Abdul Rahman Baba (to Release)
—	GK	Malaysia	Amir Omar Khata (to Chanthaburi F.C.)
—	FW	Malaysia	Ammerrul Hisyam Amran (to Betaria FC)
—	FW	Malaysia	Muhd Hafiz Abu Hassan (to Betaria FC)
—	MF	Malaysia	Mohd Zarul Nazmie (to Malacca FA)

== Betaria FC ==
=== In ===
- (Malaysia) Badrol Hanapi Ali from MP Muar FC
- (Malaysia) M. Ravinthiran from MP Muar FC
- (Malaysia) Mohd Fadhullah Yunfisar from MP Muar FC
- (Malaysia) Muhd Shahrul Nizam Abdul Hamid from MP Muar FC
- (Malaysia) Muhd Afiq Akhmal Zunaidi from MP Muar FC
- (Malaysia) Nasrullah Hanif Johan from MP Muar FC
- (Malaysia) L. Rajesh from MP Muar FC
- (Malaysia) S. Harivarman from MP Muar FC
- (Malaysia) Mohd Saufi Ibrahim from Johor FC
- (Malaysia) Azrine Efendy Sa'duddin from Sime Darby FC
- (Malaysia) P. Haresh from PKNS FC President's Cup Team
- (Malaysia) N. Dhurai from PDRM FA
- (Malaysia) C. Premnath from Penang FA
- (Malaysia) Mohd Afendi Ishak from Johor FC President's Cup
- (Malaysia) Mohd Amirul Rosli from Perlis FA
- (Malaysia) Al Amin Abdullah from PBDKT T-Team FC President's Cup Team
- (Malaysia) Mohd Fauzi Abdul Kadar from MP Muar FC
- (Malaysia) Mohd Syafez Mohammad from Kedah President's Cup Team
- (Malaysia) Adli Muhammad from MP Muar FC
- (Malaysia) Mohd Nadzmeer Hisham from MP Muar FC
- (Malaysia) Ammerrul Hisyam Amran from ATM FA
- (Malaysia) Mohd Khairul Izzuwan Saari from MP Muar FC
- (Malaysia) V. Darman Pandithan from Selangor FA
- (Malaysia) S. Gregory Edward from Malacca FA
- (Malaysia) Mohd Zaidee Jamalluddin from Pahang FA
- (Malaysia) Mohd Azwan Mohd Nor from MP Muar FC

=== Out ===
- (Malaysia) Ahmad Syahidan Abdul Mubin to Malacca FA
- (Malaysia) Abdul Aziz Ismail to MP Muar FC
- (Malaysia) Kamarul Zamil Baharom to MBJB FC
- Hanif Mohd Nor to Pos Malaysia FC
- (Malaysia) Azari Dermaraju to Release
- (Malaysia) Norfaizzal Faroq Zaharuddin to MP Muar FC
- (Malaysia) Hardi Ahmad to Release
- (Malaysia) Zool Ihsan Yunos to MP Muar FC
- (Malaysia) Che Hisamuddin Hassan to Release
- (Malaysia) Zainuddin Mohamed to Release
- (Malaysia) G. Sivabalan to Release
- (Malaysia) M. Anthony to Release
- (Malaysia) Azlie Kidam to Release
- (Malaysia) Mohd Hazeman Abdul Karim to Release
- (Malaysia) Mohd Shahrul Shahzrin Hamid to Melodi Jaya Sports Club
- (Malaysia) P. Sivanantham to Release
- (Malaysia) Rudi Ezuan Omar to Release
- (Malaysia) Mohd Hilmi Rosli to Release
- (Malaysia) P. Sutharsan to Release
- (Malaysia) M. Dinesh to Release
- (Malaysia) Ng Choon Yiap to Release

== Felda United FC ==
=== In ===
Note: Flags indicate national team as defined under FIFA eligibility rules; some limited exceptions apply. Players may hold more than one non-FIFA nationality.

No.	Pos.	Nation	Player
—	GK	Malaysia	Mohd Suffian Abdul Rahman (from Pahang FA)
—	GK	Malaysia	Mohd Syamim Othman (from Johor FA)
—	DF	Malaysia	Mohd Farid Ramli (from Kuala Lumpur FA)
—	DF	Malaysia	Muhd Nazri Ahmad (from Harimau Muda A)
—	DF	Malaysia	Mohd Irfan Abdul Ghani (from Johor FC)
—	DF	Malaysia	M. Sivakumar (from Sabah FA)
—	FW	Senegal	Pape Cire Dia (from ASC Diaraf)
—	MF	Malaysia	Yong Kuong Yong (from Kuala Lumpur FA)
—	MF	Malaysia	Khairan Ezuan Razali (on loan from Kelantan FA)
—	MF	Malaysia	Mohammad Hardi Jaafar (from Selangor FA)
—	MF	Malaysia	Mohd Raimi Mohd Nor (from Sime Darby FC)

No.	Pos.	Nation	Player
—	MF	Malaysia	S. Sivanesan (from Harimau Muda A)
—	FW	Malaysia	Mohd Firdaus Faudzi (from Kedah FA)
—	FW	Malaysia	Mohd Norizam Salaman (from Johor FA)
—	FW	Malaysia	Mohd Nizad Ayub (on loan from Kelantan FA)
—	FW	Malaysia	Ahmad Fakri Saarani (from Negeri Sembilan FA)
—	FW	Malaysia	Ahmad Aminuddin Shaharudin (from Negeri Sembilan FA)
—	DF	Cameroon	Makadji Boukar (from Free agent)
—	FW	Guadeloupe	Mickaël Antoine-Curier (from Ethnikos Achnas)
—	DF	Guadeloupe	Eddy Viator (from Toronto FC)
24	DF	Malaysia	Mohd Hafiszuan Salehuddin (from Perak FA)

=== Out ===
Note: Flags indicate national team as defined under FIFA eligibility rules; some limited exceptions apply. Players may hold more than one non-FIFA nationality.

No.	Pos.	Nation	Player
—	GK	Malaysia	Abdul Zainal Rabin (to MP Muar FC)
—	GK	Malaysia	Mohammad Faizal Abdul Rashid (Released)
—	DF	Malaysia	Azrul Azmi (on loan to Kuala Lumpur FA)
—	DF	Malaysia	Rashid Mahmud (to Negeri Sembilan FA)
—	DF	Malaysia	Ramesh Lai Ban Huat (to Sarawak FA)
—	DF	Malaysia	Muhamad Kaironnisam Sahabudin Hussain (to Johor FC)
—	MF	Malaysia	Mohd Hasmarul Fadzir Hassan (to Selangor FA)
—	MF	Malaysia	Chow Chee Weng (to Retired)
—	MF	Malaysia	Mohd Hazsyafiq Hamzah (to Johor FA)
—	MF	Malaysia	Mohd Badrul Azam Mohd Zamri (to Perak FA)
—	MF	Malaysia	Mohd Khairul Anuar Jamil (on loan to Kuala Lumpur FA)

No.	Pos.	Nation	Player
—	MF	Malaysia	Liew Kit Kong (Released)
—	MF	Malaysia	Muhamad Zamri Chin (to Johor FC)
—	MF	Malaysia	K. Rajan (to Sarawak FA)
—	MF	Malaysia	Mohd Syazwan Zainon (to Johor FC)
—	MF	Malaysia	Azi Shahril Azmi (to Johor FC)
—	FW	Malaysia	Mohd Nizaruddin Yusof (to PKNS FC)
—	FW	Malaysia	Amir Shahreen Mubin (Released)
—	FW	Senegal	Pape Cire Dia (Released)
—	MF	Cameroon	Makadji Boukar (Released)

== Harimau Muda B ==
Transfers (In)

Note: Flags indicate national team as defined under FIFA eligibility rules; some limited exceptions apply. Players may hold more than one non-FIFA nationality.

No.	Pos.	Nation	Player
—	GK	Malaysia	Mohd Firdaus Muhammad (from SSBJ)
—	GK	Malaysia	Syazani Puat (from -)
—	GK	Malaysia	Ilham Amirullah Razali (from SSBJ)
—	DF	Malaysia	Ridzuan Abdunloh (from SSBJ)
—	DF	Malaysia	Muhd Asri Mardzuki (from SSBJ)
—	DF	Malaysia	Mohd Ashmawi Yakin (from SSBJ)
—	DF	Malaysia	Muhd Hafizal Mohd Alias (from Terengganu FA President's Cup Team)
—	DF	Malaysia	Muhd Radhi Mohd Yusof (from Terengganu FA President's Cup Team)
—	DF	Malaysia	Wan Ahmad Amirzafran Wan Nadris (from Terengganu FA President's Cup Team)
—	MF	Malaysia	Zaiful Abdul Hakim (from SSBJ)
—	MF	Malaysia	Hanif Dzahir (from SSBJ)

No.	Pos.	Nation	Player
—	MF	Malaysia	Nik Syafiq Syazwan Nik Min (from SSBJ)
—	MF	Malaysia	Mohd Yazid Zaini (from SSBJ)
—	MF	Malaysia	Muhd Hadin Azman (from -)
—	MF	Malaysia	Mohd Khairul Asyraf Ramli (from -)
—	MF	Malaysia	Alif Shafiq Suhaimi (from Terengganu FA President's Cup Team)
—	FW	Malaysia	Muhd Akhir Bahari (from SSBJ)
—	FW	Malaysia	Mohd Norhamizaref Hamid (from SSBJ)
—	DF	Malaysia	Gan Jay Han (from -)

Transfers (Out)

Note: Flags indicate national team as defined under FIFA eligibility rules; some limited exceptions apply. Players may hold more than one non-FIFA nationality.

No.	Pos.	Nation	Player
—	GK	Malaysia	Muhammad Syazani Mat Puat (to Perak FA)
—	MF	Malaysia	Zaiful Abdul Hakim (to Selangor FA)
—	GK	Malaysia	Mohd Farhan Abu Bakar (to Harimau Muda A)
—	GK	Malaysia	Zulfadhli Mohamed (to Johor FA)
—	DF	Malaysia	Syazwan Tajuddin (to Harimau Muda A)
—	DF	Malaysia	Shahrul Saad (to Harimau Muda A)
—	DF	Malaysia	Muhammad Ariff Zulkifly (to Selangor FA President's Cup Team)
—	DF	Malaysia	Ahmad Faizal Sumar (to Selangor FA President's Cup Team)
—	FW	Malaysia	Muhammad Nazrul Kamaruzaman (to Selangor FA President's Cup Team)
—	DF	Malaysia	Mohd Faris Yusof (to Release)
—	MF	Malaysia	Ibrahim Aziz (to PKNS FC President's Cup Team)

No.	Pos.	Nation	Player
—	MF	Malaysia	Mohd Asif Mohd Azman (to Kelantan FA President's Cup Team)
—	FW	Malaysia	Muhammad Arip Amiruddin (to Selangor FA President's Cup Team)
—	MF	Malaysia	D. Saarvindran (to Harimau Muda A)
—	MF	Malaysia	Mohd Nor Hakim Isa (to Perak FA President's Cup Team)
—	MF	Malaysia	Muhamad Bukhairi Idris (to Negeri Sembilan FA)
—	MF	Malaysia	Nazmi Faiz Mansor (to Harimau Muda A)
—	FW	Malaysia	Mohd Syamim Alif Mohd Sobri (to Kedah FA)

== Johor FA ==
Transfers (In)

Note: Flags indicate national team as defined under FIFA eligibility rules; some limited exceptions apply. Players may hold more than one non-FIFA nationality.

No.	Pos.	Nation	Player
—	GK	Malaysia	K. Sasi Kumar (from Harimau Muda A)
—	GK	Malaysia	Zulfadhli Mohamed (from Harimau Muda B)
—	MF	Malaysia	Ashadi Yusoff (from ATM FA)
—	DF	Malaysia	Ahmad Tharmini Saiban (from PKNS FC)
—	DF	Malaysia	Mohd Nazrulerwan Makmor (from Pahang FA)
—	DF	Malaysia	Munir Amran (from Pahang FA)
—	DF	Malaysia	Mohd Hamzani Omar (from Johor FC)
—	MF	Malaysia	Mohd Fauzzi Kassim (from ATM FA)
—	DF	Malaysia	Mohd Zaidi Ahmad (from PKNS FC)
—	MF	Malaysia	Mohd Hazsyafiq Hamzah (from Felda United FC)
—	MF	Malaysia	Mohd Faizal Mansor (from Sime Darby FC)
—	FW	Malaysia	Fahruzzahar Ali (from Kuala Lumpur FA)
—	FW	Argentina	Muriel Orlando (from Free agent)
—	MF	Brazil	Andrezinho (from Ferencvárosi TC)

No.	Pos.	Nation	Player
—	FW	Malaysia	Ahmad Syamim Yahya (from Free agent)
—	FW	Malaysia	Mohd Yusri Abas (from Sime Darby FC)
—	DF	Malaysia	Jeremy Matthew Danker (from Sabah FA)
—	MF	Togo	Esseh Sodjine N'Sougah Adah (from -)
—	MF	Malaysia	Mohamad Nurfitrah Mad Shah (promote from Johor FA President's Cup Team)
—	DF	Malaysia	Muhd Afiq Mohd Amin (promote from Johor FA President's Cup Team)
—	GK	Malaysia	Mohd Amaro Shafiq Kamal (promote from Johor FA President's Cup Team)
—	MF	Malaysia	Muhammad Fazly Mazlan (promote from Johor FA President's Cup Team)
—	FW	Malaysia	Ramzi Haziq Mohamad (from Malacca FA)

Transfers (Out)

Note: Flags indicate national team as defined under FIFA eligibility rules; some limited exceptions apply. Players may hold more than one non-FIFA nationality.

No.	Pos.	Nation	Player
—	GK	Malaysia	Amirul Abu Seman (to Kuala Lumpur FA)
—	GK	Malaysia	Afiff Aizad Azman (to UiTM FC)
—	GK	Malaysia	Mohd Syamim Othman (to Felda United FC)
—	GK	Malaysia	Mohamad Amrol Jaihan (to Release)
—	DF	Malaysia	Mohd Syukri Ismail (to Release)
—	DF	Malaysia	Mohd Nazrin Baharuddin (to Perlis FA)
—	DF	Malaysia	Mohd Affandy Adimel (to Release)
—	DF	Malaysia	Ismail Suboh (to Johor FC)
—	MF	Malaysia	Adib Aizuddin Abdul Latif (to Selangor FA)
—	FW	Malaysia	Mohd Fahian Roslan (to Release)
—	MF	Malaysia	Mohd Azuwad Mohd Arip (to Muar Municipal Council FC)
—	FW	Malaysia	Mohd Asyraf Al-Japri (to Sime Darby FC)
—	FW	Malaysia	Mohd Norizam Salaman (to Felda United FC)
—	MF	Malaysia	Mohd Alif Mohd Yusof (to MBJB FC)

No.	Pos.	Nation	Player
—	MF	Malaysia	Jasazrin Jamaluddin (to Johor FC)
—	DF	Malaysia	Wan Azwari Wan Nor (to Pahang FA)
—	MF	Malaysia	Abdul Halim Rosli (to Release)
—	FW	Malaysia	Zulindra Shah Putra Adam (to Release)
—	DF	Malaysia	Hishamuddin Othman (to Kuala Lumpur FA)
—	MF	Malaysia	Mohd Shoufiq Mohamad Khusaini (to Sime Darby FC)
—	DF	Malaysia	Azharridzuan Alias (to SDMS Kepala Batas FC)
—	DF	Malaysia	Mohd Zaky Zulkifli (to Melodi Jaya Sports Club)
—	GK	Malaysia	Mohamad Amirul Asraf Md Nor (to MBJB FC)
—	FW	Malaysia	Yuhendri bin Rusdi (to MBJB FC)
—	FW	Malaysia	Muhamad Rafef bin Raya (to MBJB FC)
—	DF	Malaysia	Mohamad Syahbani bin Abdullah (to Melodi Jaya)
—	MF	Malaysia	Mohd Syafiq bin Abdul Rahman (to Melodi Jaya)
—	MF	Togo	Esseh Sodjine N'Sougah Adah (to Release)

== Johor FC ==
=== In ===
Note: Flags indicate national team as defined under FIFA eligibility rules; some limited exceptions apply. Players may hold more than one non-FIFA nationality.

No.	Pos.	Nation	Player
—	GK	Malaysia	Mohd Zamir Selamat (from Harimau Muda A)
—	DF	Malaysia	Shafizan Hashim (from Kedah FA)
—	DF	Malaysia	Ismail Suboh (from Johor FA)
—	DF	Malaysia	Muhamad Kaironnisam Sahabudin Hussain (from Felda United FC)
—	MF	Malaysia	Ahmad Fauzi Shaari (from Kedah FA)
—	MF	Malaysia	Azi Shahril Azmi (from Felda United FC)
—	FW	Brazil	Arthuro Bernhardt (from Avaí)

No.	Pos.	Nation	Player
—	MF	Malaysia	Jasazrin Jamaluddin (from Johor FA)
—	MF	Malaysia	Mohd Syazwan Zainon (from Felda United FC)
—	FW	Malaysia	Mohd Farid Ideris (from Sabah FA)
—	FW	Malaysia	Muhamad Zamri Chin (from Felda United FC)
—	FW	Malaysia	Mohd Haris Safwan Mohd Kamal (from PBDKT T-Team FC)
—	DF	Brazil	Fernando Abreu Ferreira (from IFK Mariehamn)
—	FW	Malaysia	Qaiser Najmi Hafadz (from 1.FC Nürnberg)

=== Out ===
Note: Flags indicate national team as defined under FIFA eligibility rules; some limited exceptions apply. Players may hold more than one non-FIFA nationality.

No.	Pos.	Nation	Player
—	GK	Malaysia	Suhardy Alby (to MP Muar FC)
—	DF	Malaysia	Mohd Hamzani Omar (to Johor FA)
—	DF	Malaysia	Hafiz Aridin (to MP Muar FC)
—	DF	Malaysia	Mohd Irfan Abdul Ghani (to Felda United FC)
—	DF	Malaysia	Mohd Radzi Jasman (to Muar Municipal Council FC)
—	DF	Malaysia	Mohd Rizal Roslan (to Release)
—	DF	Malaysia	Mat Saiful Mohamad (to PBAPP FC)
—	MF	Malaysia	Rezal Zambery Yahya (to ATM FA)
—	MF	Malaysia	Mohd Azizan Baba (to Sarawak FA)

No.	Pos.	Nation	Player
—	FW	Malaysia	Mohd Rasyid Aya (to Sarawak FA)
—	FW	Malaysia	Mohd Ezaidy Khadar (to MP Muar FC)
—	FW	Malaysia	Wan Mohd Hoesne Wan Hussain (to Selangor FA)
—	FW	Malaysia	Mohd Saufi Ibrahim (to Betaria FC)
—	MF	Malaysia	Mohd Faqroul Faiz Mohd Nizam (to MBJB FC)
—	GK	Malaysia	Mohamad Sharin Asri (to MBJB FC)
—	DF	Malaysia	MJabar Nasir (to MBJB FC)
—	DF	Malaysia	Azmi Omar (to MBJB FC)
—	FW	Malaysia	Azuan Izam (to MBJB FC)

== MBJB FC ==
=== In ===
Note: Flags indicate national team as defined under FIFA eligibility rules; some limited exceptions apply. Players may hold more than one non-FIFA nationality.

No.	Pos.	Nation	Player
—	GK	Malaysia	Nor Iman Razali (from Rapid KL FC)
—	MF	Malaysia	Mohd Khairul Abdul Kadir (from Kuala Lumpur FA)
—	FW	Malaysia	Mohd Shahareen Abdullah (from Malacca FA)
—	FW	Malaysia	Wan Muhammad Aiman Wan Rafiee (from Sime Darby FC President's Cup Team)
—	DF	Malaysia	Muhammad Asyraf Khairudin (from Selangor FA President's Cup Team)
—	DF	Malaysia	Kamarul Zamil Baharom (from Betaria FC)
—	FW	Malaysia	Azmi Sarmin (from Kuala Lumpur FA)
—	FW	Malaysia	Nur Adli Effandi Mohd Pauzee (from Pos Malaysia FC)
—	DF	Malaysia	Muhd Syazwan Rani (from Rapid KL FC)
—	MF	Malaysia	Khairul Anwar Abu (from Rapid KL FC)
—	MF	Malaysia	Muhammad Zulhisyam Mohd Safian (from Selangor FA President's Cup Team)
—	MF	Malaysia	Muhammad Azreen Zulkafali (from Rapid KL FC)
—	GK	Malaysia	Mohamad Sharin Asri (from Johor FC)

No.	Pos.	Nation	Player
—	GK	Malaysia	Mohamad Amirul Asraf Mohd Nor (from Johor FA)
—	DF	Malaysia	Muhamad Sharil Misman (from SDMS Kepala Batas FC)
—	DF	Malaysia	Muhammad Faees bin Abdul Rahim (from Penang FA)
—	DF	Malaysia	Jabar Nasir (from Johor FC)
—	DF	Malaysia	Azmi Omar (from Johor FC)
—	MF	Malaysia	Mohd Alif Mohd Yusof (from Johor FA)
—	MF	Malaysia	Azuan Izam (from Johor FC)
—	MF	Malaysia	Nabilah Khan Razali (from Pahang FA)
—	MF	Malaysia	Muhd Faqroul Faiz Mohd Nizam (from Johor FC)
—	FW	Malaysia	Muhamad Rafef bin Raya (from Johor FA)
—	FW	Malaysia	Yuhendri bin Rusdi (from Johor FA)
—	FW	Malaysia	Mohd Emie Rohaizad Johari (from Penang FA)
—	DF	Bosnia and Herzegovina	Dalibor Dragic (from FK Rudar Prijedor)
—	MF	Malaysia	Muhamad Sauffi Saat (from Malacca FA)

== Kedah FA ==
=== Transfers (In) ===
Note: Flags indicate national team as defined under FIFA eligibility rules; some limited exceptions apply. Players may hold more than one non-FIFA nationality.

No.	Pos.	Nation	Player
—	DF	Malaysia	Kamal Azira Abdul Manah (from USM FC)
—	DF	Malaysia	Bashahrul Abu Bakar (from Harimau Muda A)
—	DF	Malaysia	Mohd Sany Mat Isa (from Perlis FA)
—	DF	Malaysia	Azmizi Azmi (from Perlis FA)
—	MF	France	Abdulfatah Safi (from Free agent)
—	MF	Malaysia	See Kok Luen (from Kuala Lumpur FA)
—	MF	Malaysia	Wan Mohd Syukri Wan Ahmad (from Perlis FA)

No.	Pos.	Nation	Player
—	FW	Malaysia	Mohd Syamim Alif Mohd Sobri (from Harimau Muda B)
—	FW	Croatia	Vedran Gerc (from HNK Rijeka)
—	FW	Malaysia	Mohd Shazuan Mohd Ashraf Mathews (from Perak FA)
—	FW	Malaysia	Abdul Latiff Suhaimi (from Penang FA)
—	DF	Malaysia	Mohd Shaaban Roslan (from SSBJ)
—	DF	Malaysia	Osman Yusoff (from SSBJ)

=== Transfers (Out) ===
Note: Flags indicate national team as defined under FIFA eligibility rules; some limited exceptions apply. Players may hold more than one non-FIFA nationality.

No.	Pos.	Nation	Player
—	GK	Malaysia	Muhammad Al-Hafiz Hamzah (to USM FC)
—	DF	Malaysia	Mohd Zulfaizham Kamis (to Negeri Sembilan FA)
—	DF	Malaysia	Shafizan Hashim (to Johor FC)
—	DF	Malaysia	Mohd Shahril Faizal (to PBDKT T-Team FC)
—	MF	Malaysia	Ahmad Fauzi Shaari (to Johor FC)
—	MF	Malaysia	Mohd Tarmizi Yusoff (to Penang FA)
—	MF	Malaysia	Mohamad Erwan Ismail (to SDMS Kepala Batas FC President's Cup Team)
—	GK	Malaysia	Salahuddin Al-Ayubi Mohd Hisham (to Release)
—	DF	Malaysia	Mohd Zamshah Ridzuan Halib (to Release)
—	DF	Malaysia	Amran Ismail (to Release)
—	DF	Malaysia	Mohd Nizam Abdullah (to Release)
—	DF	Malaysia	Mohd Syafez Mohammad (to Betaria FC)
—	DF	Malaysia	Nasrun Hafiz Jamil (to ATM FA)
—	MF	Malaysia	Zulhasani Ahmad Pudzi (to Release)
—	DF	Malaysia	Mohd Muzakir Abdul Razak (to Release)

No.	Pos.	Nation	Player
—	FW	Malaysia	Ahmad Shakir Mohd Ali (to Negeri Sembilan FA)
—	FW	Malaysia	Azlan Ismail (to Kelantan FA)
—	FW	Malaysia	Mohd Saddam Mohd Nor (to Pos Malaysia FC)
—	FW	Malaysia	Mohd Firdaus Mohd Faudzi (to Felda United)
—	DF	Brazil	Danilo Vivaldo (to Release)
—	MF	Brazil	Daniel Baroni (to Release)
—	DF	Malaysia	Mohd Putra Alif Othman (to Melodi Jaya Sports Club)
—	MF	Malaysia	Omar Sharif Othman (to Release)
—	MF	Malaysia	Tan Yang Wei (to Release)
—	FW	Malaysia	Ivan Por Kean Hai (to Release)
—	FW	Malaysia	Zulhaniff Helmi Ghazali (to Release)
—	FW	Malaysia	Mohd Aidi Huzaini (to Release)
—	FW	Malaysia	Norfaizul Ishak (to Release)
—	MF	Malaysia	Ahmad Amirul Akramin Abdul Aziz (to Release)

== Kelantan FA ==
=== Transfers (In) ===
Note: Flags indicate national team as defined under FIFA eligibility rules; some limited exceptions apply. Players may hold more than one non-FIFA nationality.

No.	Pos.	Nation	Player
—	GK	Malaysia	Syazwan Yusoff (promote from Kelantan FA President's Cup Team)
—	GK	Malaysia	Mohd Fakhrudin Husin (promote from Liga Dun Tumpat)
—	DF	Malaysia	Nik Shahrul Azim (promote from Kelantan FA President's Cup Team)
—	DF	Malaysia	Mohd Zamri Ramli (promote from Kelantan FA President's Cup Team)
—	DF	Nigeria	Obinna Nwaneri (from Kazma)
—	MF	Malaysia	Khairul Izuan Rosli (promote from Kelantan FA President's Cup Team)
—	MF	Malaysia	Azizi Matt Rose (from PBDKT T-Team FC)
—	MF	Malaysia	Mohd Nor Farhan Muhammad (from PBDKT T-Team FC)
—	MF	Malaysia	Indra Putra Mahayuddin (from PBDKT T-Team FC)

No.	Pos.	Nation	Player
—	MF	Ghana	Emmanuel Okine (from Great Olympics)
—	MF	Lebanon	Zakaria Charara (from Ermis Aradippou)
—	MF	Malaysia	Mohd Asif Azman (from Harimau Muda B)
—	FW	Malaysia	Muhd Nurfirdaus Roswanan (from MP Muar FC)
—	FW	Malaysia	Mohd Aris Zaidi (promote from Kelantan FA President's Cup Team)
—	FW	Ghana	Denny Antwi (from Accra Hearts of Oak SC)
—	FW	Lebanon	Mohammed Ghaddar (from Al-Jaish)
—	FW	Malaysia	Azlan Ismail (from Kedah FA)
—	FW	Nigeria	Onyekachi Nwoha (from Al Fujairah)

=== Transfers (Out) ===
Note: Flags indicate national team as defined under FIFA eligibility rules; some limited exceptions apply. Players may hold more than one non-FIFA nationality.

No.	Pos.	Nation	Player
—	GK	Malaysia	Norhadi Ubaidillah (to UiTM FC)
—	GK	Malaysia	Syed Adney Syed Hussein (to Sabah FA)
—	GK	Malaysia	Mohd Halim Napi (to Retired)
—	DF	Malaysia	Wan Rohaimi Wan Ismail (Released)
—	DF	Malaysia	Tuan Norhafiziee Mahmood (to MP Muar FC)
—	MF	Malaysia	Khairan Eroza Razali (to Pahang FA)
—	MF	Malaysia	Danial Fadzly Abdullah (to ATM FA)
—	MF	Malaysia	Solehin Kanasian Abdullah (to Selangor FA)
—	MF	Malaysia	Khairan Ezuan Razali (on loan to Felda United FC)
—	MF	Malaysia	Syawal Rudin Abdul Rahim (to MP Muar FC)
—	MF	Malaysia	Wan Zaman Wan Mustapha (to PDRM FA)
—	MF	Malaysia	Zul Yusri Che Harun (to Release)
—	MF	Malaysia	Muhd Izuan Salahuddin (on loan to Harimau Muda A)
—	FW	Malaysia	Mohd Nizad Ayub (on loan to Felda United FC)

No.	Pos.	Nation	Player
—	FW	Malaysia	Muhamad Khalid Jamlus (Released)
—	DF	Malaysia	Mohd Faiz Suhaimi (Released)
—	DF	Malaysia	Mohd Zi Zulkeplee (Released)
—	DF	Malaysia	Mohamad Nazrul Mazlan (Released)
—	MF	Malaysia	Norhamizi Haron (Released)
—	MF	Malaysia	Nicholas Chan (Released)
—	MF	Malaysia	Mohammad Rozaimi Azwar Mat Noor (to Perlis FA)
—	MF	Malaysia	Syafiq Haikal Nazarudin (Released)
—	MF	Malaysia	Mohd Norhafifi Othman (Released)
—	FW	Malaysia	Mohd Farhan Yaacob (Released)
—	MF	Ghana	Emmanuel Okine (on loan to Kuala Lumpur FA)
—	MF	Lebanon	Zakaria Charara (on loan to Kuala Lumpur FA)

== Kuala Lumpur FA ==
In

Note: Flags indicate national team as defined under FIFA eligibility rules; some limited exceptions apply. Players may hold more than one non-FIFA nationality.

No.	Pos.	Nation	Player
—	DF	Malaysia	Azrul Azmi (on loan from Felda United FC)
—	MF	Malaysia	Khairul Anuar Jamil (on loan from Felda United FC)
—	DF	Malaysia	Aiman Syazwan Abdullah (from Harimau Muda B)
—	GK	Malaysia	Rozaimie Rohim (from -)
—	GK	Malaysia	Amirul Abu Seman (from Johor FA)
—	DF	Malaysia	Hishamuddin Othman (from Johor FA)
—	DF	Malaysia	Mohd Aslam Najumudeen (from PKNS FC)
—	DF	Malaysia	Mohd Khushairie A'ashri (from Negeri Sembilan FA)
—	DF	Malaysia	Al Sadam Kairul (from Negeri Sembilan FA President's Cup Team 2010)
—	DF	Malaysia	Muhd Hafiz Mohd Fauzi (from SSBJ)
—	MF	Malaysia	Mohd Zameer Zainun (from PKNS FC)
—	MF	Malaysia	Nur Hakim Adzhar (from -)
—	MF	Malaysia	Pritam Singh Charun Singh (from CIMB FC)
—	FW	Malaysia	Stanley Bernard Stephen Samuel (from Sabah FA)
—	FW	Malaysia	Fazuan Abdullah (from PDRM FA)
—	MF	Malaysia	G. Ganesan (from Selangor FA)

Out

Note: Flags indicate national team as defined under FIFA eligibility rules; some limited exceptions apply. Players may hold more than one non-FIFA nationality.

No.	Pos.	Nation	Player
—	GK	Malaysia	Norazlan Razali (to Selangor FA)
—	GK	Malaysia	Remezey Che Ros (to PKNS FC)
—	DF	Malaysia	Muhd Shahrom Abdul Kalam (to Perak FA)
—	DF	Malaysia	Mohd Fitri Jamaluddin (to USM FC)
—	DF	Malaysia	Mohd Farid Ramli (to Felda United FC)
—	DF	Malaysia	Ahmad Azlan Zainal (to PKNS FC)
—	DF	Malaysia	Mohd Farouk Hashim (to PKNS FC)
—	DF	Malaysia	Kamarulzaman Mahamud (Released)
—	DF	Malaysia	Mohd Dzaiddin Zainudin (to PBDKT T-Team FC)
—	MF	Malaysia	Mohd Nazrin Nawi (to Negeri Sembilan FA)
—	MF	Malaysia	Norismaidham Ismail (to Negeri Sembilan FA)
—	MF	Malaysia	Fahrul Razi Kamaruddin (to Perak FA)
—	MF	Malaysia	Azwan Abdul Malek (to PKNS FC)
—	MF	Malaysia	Yong Kuong Yong (to Felda United FC)
—	MF	Malaysia	See Kok Luen (to Kedah FA)
—	MF	Malaysia	Syazmin Firdaus Aminuddin (to -)
—	MF	Malaysia	M. Ganeswaran (to Sime Darby FC)
—	FW	Malaysia	Fahruzzahar Ali (to Johor FA)
—	FW	Malaysia	Mohd Azmi Sarmin (to MBJB FC)

== Malacca FA ==
=== In ===
- (Malaysia) M. Tamilselvam from MP Muar FC
- (Malaysia) Mohd Jailani Abdullah from MP Muar FC
- (Malaysia) Muhammad Munawwar Shavukath Ali from Perlis FA
- (Malaysia) Ahmad Syahidan Abdul Mubin from Betaria FC
- (Malaysia) S. Sadesh Kumar from MP Muar FC
- (Malaysia) J. Thevaggaran Nair from MP Muar FC
- (Malaysia) Mohd Fhadzil bin Mohd Limin from Rapid KL FC
- (Malaysia) Zailan bin Mohamad from MP Muar FC
- (Malaysia) Nik Shahrul Anizan bin Mohammad from Perlis FA
- (Malaysia) B. Thangaraju promote from Malacca FA President's Cup Team
- (Malaysia) R. Vishnu Nair promote from Malacca FA President's Cup Team
- (Malaysia) R. Nandakopal from MP Muar FC
- (Malaysia) Mohamad Akbar bin Khamis from Selangor FA President's Cup Team
- (Malaysia) Mohamad Hafif Azhar from Selangor FA President's Cup Team
- (Malaysia) Badrul Hisyam Mohamad from Selangor FA President's Cup Team
- (Malaysia) Mohd Zarul Nazmie from ATM FA
- (Malaysia) Khairul Efsan Mat Isa from PKNS FC

=== Out ===
- (Malaysia) Azuan Othman to Release
- (Malaysia) Rozaidey Othman to Release
- (Malaysia) Normizal Ismail to Release
- (Malaysia) Zakaria Abdul Karim to Release
- (Malaysia) Mohd Samsudin Senin to Release
- (Malaysia) Mohd Nor Dani to Release
- (Malaysia) Ahmad Kamal Jamallul Rahman to Perlis FA
- (Malaysia) M. Ragu to Release
- (Malaysia) Muhammad Hafifi Hafiz Baharom to Release
- (Malaysia) Mohd Helme Leman to Release
- (Malaysia) Muhammad Hafiz Mustaffa Bakri to Release
- (Malaysia) Mohd Yusri Mustafa to SDMS Kepala Batas FC
- (Malaysia) Rahim Abu Bakar to Release
- (Malaysia) Abdul Zaini Abdullah to Release
- (Malaysia) Mohd Shahareen Abdullah to MBJB FC
- (Malaysia) Khairul Anwar Shahrudin to MP Muar FC
- (Malaysia) Muhd Hanafiah Abu Bakar to MP Muar FC
- (Malaysia) Abidul Qahhar Roslan to MP Muar FC
- (Malaysia) Ramzi Haziq Mohamad to Johor FA
- (Malaysia) Ahmad Khuzaimie Piee to MP Muar FC
- (Malaysia) Ammer Syafiq Abdul Rahman to MP Muar FC
- (Malaysia) Mohd Azarol Aidil Razmay to MP Muar FC
- (Malaysia) Mohd Nizam Yusri to MP Muar FC
- (Malaysia) Saiful Nizam Mohd Yassin to MP Muar FC
- (Malaysia) A. Jagen Jayaraj to Melodi Jaya Sports Club
- (Malaysia) Hazril Here to Johor FC
- (Malaysia) S. Gregory Edward to Betaria FC
- (Malaysia) N. Thirushilvan to Melodi Jaya Sports Club

== MP Muar FC ==
Transfers (In)

Note: Flags indicate national team as defined under FIFA eligibility rules; some limited exceptions apply. Players may hold more than one non-FIFA nationality.

No.	Pos.	Nation	Player
—	GK	Malaysia	Muhd Zul Haikal Sohaime (from Pahang FA President's Cup Team)
—	GK	Malaysia	Mohd Bidaus Abdullah (from Free agent)
—	GK	Malaysia	Abdul Zainal Rabin (from Felda United FC)
—	GK	Malaysia	Suhardy Alby (from Johor FC)
—	DF	Malaysia	Mohd Hafiz Aridin (from Johor FC)
—	DF	Malaysia	Abdul Aziz Ismail (from Betaria FC)
—	MF	Malaysia	Mohd Norhisham Hassan (from PKNS FC)
—	DF	Zambia	Evans Chisulo (from Konkola Blades)
—	DF	Malaysia	Mohd Radzi Jasman (from Johor FC)
—	DF	Malaysia	Khairul Anwar Shahrudin (from Malacca FA)
—	DF	Malaysia	Tuan Norhafiziee Mahmood (from Kelantan FA)
—	FW	Malaysia	Mohd Alafi Mahmud (from Pahang FA)
—	MF	Malaysia	Muhd Hanafiah Abu Bakar (from Malacca FA)
—	FW	Malaysia	R. Puganeswaran (from Penang President's Cup)
—	MF	Malaysia	B.Thinagaran (from Penang President's Cup)

No.	Pos.	Nation	Player
—	MF	Kenya	Hillary Echesa (from Tusker F.C.)
—	MF	Malaysia	Mohd Azuwad Arip (from Johor FA)
—	MF	Malaysia	Ahmad Khusaini Piee (from Free agent)
—	DF	Malaysia	Ahmad Khuzaimie Piee (from Malacca FA)
—	MF	Malaysia	Mohd Syawal Rudin Rahim (from Kelantan FA)
—	MF	Malaysia	Mohd Syaiful Sabtu (from Sarawak FA)
—	FW	Malaysia	Mohd Amiruddin Taib (from Selangor FA President's Cup Team)
—	FW	Malaysia	Abidul Qahhar Roslan (from Malacca FA)
—	FW	Malaysia	Abdul Rayjal Jalil (from Sarawak FA)
—	FW	Malaysia	Efendi Abdul Malek (from ATM FA)
—	FW	Malaysia	Mohd Ezaidy Khadar (from Johor FC)
—	FW	Malaysia	Tuan Mohd Norhisan Tuan Mahmood (from Free agent)
—	FW	Malaysia	Noor Azeeli Kamisan (from Penang FA)
—	FW	Malaysia	Ooi Shee Keong (from Penang FA)

Transfers (Out)

Note: Flags indicate national team as defined under FIFA eligibility rules; some limited exceptions apply. Players may hold more than one non-FIFA nationality.

No.	Pos.	Nation	Player
—	GK	Malaysia	Badrol Hanapi Ali (to Betaria FC)
—	GK	Malaysia	Kamaruddin Tahir (to Release)
—	GK	Malaysia	Sani Anuar Kamsani (to Sarawak FA)
—	DF	Malaysia	Fitri Maskon (to Release)
—	DF	Malaysia	M. Ravinthiran (to Betaria FC)
—	DF	Malaysia	Che Ku Ahmad Rusydi Amir (to Release)
—	DF	Malaysia	Mohd Fadhlullah Yunfisar (to Betaria FC)
—	MF	Malaysia	Ismail Kamil (to Release)
—	MF	Malaysia	S. Harithas (to Release)
—	MF	Malaysia	Muaz Badiozzaman (to Release)
—	MF	Malaysia	Zakaria Abu Yamin (to Malacca FA)
—	DF	Malaysia	P. Kesavan (to Release)
—	DF	Malaysia	Ching Hong Aik (to Retired)
—	FW	Malaysia	L. Rajesh (to Betaria FC)
—	MF	Malaysia	Mohd Norhakim Hassan (to PKNS FC)
—	DF	Malaysia	Mohd Saiful Rusly (to Release)
—	FW	Malaysia	Mohan R.Azmi (to Release)
—	GK	Malaysia	Mohd Khairul Izzuwan Saari (to Betaria FC)
—	DF	Malaysia	Mohd Shafiquddin Ibrahim (to Release)
—	FW	Malaysia	Mohd Afizan Azhar (to Release)

No.	Pos.	Nation	Player
—	FW	Malaysia	Mohd Faizol Che Noh (to Release)
—	DF	Malaysia	J. Thevagarran Nair (to Malacca FA)
—	DF	Malaysia	S. Harivarman (to Betaria FC)
—	MF	Malaysia	Muhd Afiq Akhmal Zunaidi (to Betaria FC)
—	FW	Malaysia	Mohd Fauzi Abdul Kadar (to Betaria FC)
—	MF	Malaysia	Nasrullah Hanif Johan (to Betaria FC)
—	DF	Malaysia	S. Sadesh Kumar (to Malacca FA)
—	MF	Malaysia	Zailan Mohamad (to Malacca FA)
—	DF	Malaysia	M. Tamilselvam (to Malacca FA)
—	FW	Malaysia	Muhd Nurfirdaus Roswanan (to Kelantan FA)
—	MF	Malaysia	Muhd Shahrul Nizam Abdul Hamid (to Betaria FC)
—	MF	Malaysia	Mohd Nadzmeer Hisham (to Betaria FC)
—	MF	Malaysia	Adli Muhammad (to Betaria FC)
—	MF	Malaysia	R. Nandakopal (to Malacca FA)
—	MF	Malaysia	Mohd Azwan Mohd Nor (to Betaria FC)
—	GK	Malaysia	Mohd Jailani Abdullah (to Malacca FA)
—	MF	Malaysia	Mohd Azwan Mat Ali (to Release)
—	DF	Malaysia	N. Kartigesu (to Release)

== Negeri Sembilan FA ==
=== Transfers (In) ===
Note: Flags indicate national team as defined under FIFA eligibility rules; some limited exceptions apply. Players may hold more than one non-FIFA nationality.

No.	Pos.	Nation	Player
—	GK	Malaysia	Muhammad Kaharuddin Abdul Rahman (promote from Negeri Sembilan FA President's Cup Team)
—	GK	Malaysia	Badrulzaman Abdul Halim (from PKNS FC)
—	DF	Malaysia	Mohd Zulfaizham Kamis (from Kedah FA)
—	MF	Malaysia	Rashid Mamud (from Felda United FC)
—	MF	Malaysia	Norismaidham Ismail (from Kuala Lumpur FA)
—	MF	Malaysia	Muhamad Bukhairi Idris (from Harimau Muda B)
—	MF	Malaysia	Mohd Nizam Roslan (from SSBJ)

No.	Pos.	Nation	Player
—	MF	Malaysia	Mohd Nazrin Mohd Nawi (from Kuala Lumpur FA)
—	MF	Malaysia	V. Parameswaran (from Jempol Dream FC)
—	FW	Cameroon	Jean-Emmanuel Effa Owona (from Hatta Club)
—	DF	Slovakia	Marian Farbák (from 1. FC Tatran Prešov)
—	FW	Malaysia	Ahmad Shakir Mohd Ali (from Kedah FA)
—	FW	Malaysia	Mohd Abdul Haqim Mohd Radzuan (from PBDKT T-Team FC)

=== Transfers (Out) ===
Note: Flags indicate national team as defined under FIFA eligibility rules; some limited exceptions apply. Players may hold more than one non-FIFA nationality.

No.	Pos.	Nation	Player
—	GK	Malaysia	Mohd Farizal Harun (to ATM FA)
—	GK	Malaysia	Muhammad Hanif Saied (to UiTM FC)
—	DF	Malaysia	Mohd Aidil Zafuan Abdul Radzak (to ATM FA)
—	DF	Malaysia	Irwan Fadzli Idrus (to ATM FA)
—	DF	Malaysia	Mohd Khushairie A'ashri (to Kuala Lumpur President's Cup)
—	DF	Malaysia	Al Sadam Kairul (to Kuala Lumpur President's Cup)
—	DF	Malaysia	Muhamad Zahin Mad Shah (to Release)

No.	Pos.	Nation	Player
—	FW	Malaysia	Mohd Zaquan Adha (to ATM FA)
—	FW	Malaysia	Hairuddin Omar (to ATM FA)
—	FW	Malaysia	Ahmad Fakri Saarani (to Felda United FC)
—	FW	Malaysia	Ahmad Aminuddin Shaharudin (to Felda United FC)
—	FW	Malaysia	Hasmawi Hassan (to Penang FA)
—	FW	Malaysia	Mohd Adam Syahir Rosli (to UiTM FC)
—	DF	Malaysia	Mohd Arif Zikri Zulfikar Rajamohan (to Release)
—	FW	Malaysia	Ibrahim Suhaib Muhammad (to Release)

== Pahang FA ==
2012 Transfers (In)

Note: Flags indicate national team as defined under FIFA eligibility rules; some limited exceptions apply. Players may hold more than one non-FIFA nationality.

No.	Pos.	Nation	Player
—	GK	Malaysia	Mohd Hafiz Nasruddin (from Free agent)
—	GK	Malaysia	Ahmad Kamal Mohd Nor (from Temerloh FA)
—	DF	Malaysia	Khairul Azman Awang Long (from Shahzan Muda FC)
—	DF	Malaysia	Wan Mohd Azwari Wan Nor (from Johor FA)
—	MF	Malaysia	Abdul Wafiy Abdul Ghafar (from Shahzan Muda FC)
—	MF	Malaysia	Mohd Hazuan Mohd Daud (from Shahzan Muda FC)
—	MF	Malaysia	Gopinathan Ramachandra (from Asas Ombak FC, Kuantan League)

No.	Pos.	Nation	Player
—	MF	Malaysia	Khairan Eroza Razali (from Kelantan FA)
—	FW	Malaysia	Mohd Hafiz Kamal (from Shahzan Muda FC)
—	FW	Malaysia	Mohd Fauzi Roslan (from Shahzan Muda FC)
—	FW	Malaysia	Mohd Kamal Rodiarjat Mohd Ali (from PBDKT T-Team FC)
—	FW	Ghana	Nana Yaw Agyei (from Aduana Stars)
—	MF	Russia	Boris Kochkin (from Muktijoddha Sangsad KS)
—	FW	Russia	Eduard Sakhnevich (from Sheikh Russel KC)
—	FW	Brazil	Maycon Carvalho Inez (from Melbourne Heart FC)

2012 Transfers (Out)

Note: Flags indicate national team as defined under FIFA eligibility rules; some limited exceptions apply. Players may hold more than one non-FIFA nationality.

No.	Pos.	Nation	Player
—	GK	Malaysia	Muhamad Zul Haikal Sohaime (to MP Muar FC)
—	GK	Malaysia	Mohd Suffian Abdul Rahman (to Felda United FC)
—	DF	Malaysia	Munir Amran (to Johor FA)
—	DF	Malaysia	Mohd Nazrulerwan Makmor (to Johor FA)
—	FW	Malaysia	Rasiah Surendran (to Selangor FA)
—	FW	Malaysia	R. Kartigesu (Released)

No.	Pos.	Nation	Player
—	FW	Malaysia	Famirul Asyraf Sayuti (to Selangor FA)
—	MF	Malaysia	Mohd Fazli Baharuddin (to PKNS FC)
—	FW	Malaysia	Mohd Alafi Mahmud (to MP Muar FC)
—	MF	Malaysia	Nabilah Khan Razali (to MBJB FC)
—	DF	Malaysia	Mohd Zaidee Jamalludin (to Betaria FC)
—	FW	Ghana	Nana Yaw Agyei (Released)
—	FW	Russia	Eduard Sakhnevich (Released)

== PBDKT T-Team FC ==
=== Transfers (In) ===
Note: Flags indicate national team as defined under FIFA eligibility rules; some limited exceptions apply. Players may hold more than one non-FIFA nationality.

No.	Pos.	Nation	Player
—	GK	Malaysia	Mohd Iqbal Suhaimi (from Selangor FA)
—	DF	Bosnia and Herzegovina	Bojan Petrić (from FK Novi Pazar)
—	DF	Malaysia	Mohd Hassan Basri Ahmad Ridzuan (from Terengganu FA)
—	DF	Malaysia	Mohd Dzaiddin Zainudin (from Kuala Lumpur FA)
—	DF	Malaysia	Shahril Faizal Sharifuddin (from Kedah FA)
—	MF	Malaysia	Zharif Hasna (from Terengganu FA)
—	MF	Malaysia	Ahmad Ezrie Shafizie (from Free agent)

No.	Pos.	Nation	Player
—	MF	Malaysia	Wan Khairul Faiz Kamaruddin (from Perlis FA)
—	FW	Malaysia	Mohd Faiz Subri (from Perlis FA)
—	FW	Malaysia	Wan Muhamad Aliff Wan Jasmi (from Terengganu FA)
—	FW	Malaysia	Mohd Fadzli Saari (from Selangor FA)
—	FW	Zambia	Zachariah Simukonda (from Red Arrows F.C.)
—	MF	Brazil	Marco Tulio (from Free agent)

=== Transfers (Out) ===
Note: Flags indicate national team as defined under FIFA eligibility rules; some limited exceptions apply. Players may hold more than one non-FIFA nationality.

No.	Pos.	Nation	Player
—	GK	Malaysia	Ismail Abdul Rahman (to PBAPP FC)
—	DF	Malaysia	Azizi Matt Rose (to Kelantan FA)
—	DF	Malaysia	Subri Sulong (Released)
—	DF	Malaysia	Amzar Junaidi Abdul Jalil (to Perlis FA)
—	MF	Malaysia	Indra Putra Mahayuddin (to Kelantan FA)
—	FW	Malaysia	Mohd Abdul Haqim Mohd Radzuan (to Negeri Sembilan FA)
—	DF	Malaysia	Mohd Shaiful Azrin Shamsudin (to USM FC)

No.	Pos.	Nation	Player
—	MF	Malaysia	Mohd Nor Farhan Muhammad (to Kelantan FA)
—	MF	Malaysia	Mohd Rosli Muda (to Sime Darby FC)
—	MF	Malaysia	Al Amin Abdullah (to Betaria FC)
—	FW	Malaysia	Mohd Haris Safwan Mohd Kamal (to Johor FC)
—	FW	Malaysia	Mohd Kamal Rodiarjat Mohd Ali (to Pahang FA)
—	MF	Malaysia	Mohd Humaidi Adzmi (to Terengganu FA)
—	FW	Zambia	Zachariah Simukonda (to Release)

== PDRM FA ==
Transfers (In)

Note: Flags indicate national team as defined under FIFA eligibility rules; some limited exceptions apply. Players may hold more than one non-FIFA nationality.

No.	Pos.	Nation	Player
—	FW	Malaysia	Mohd Khalid Hamlet (from free agent)
—	DF	Malaysia	Muhd Ibrahim Mohd Ismail (from free agent)
—	DF	Malaysia	Mohd Dzul Haikal Shamery (from free agent)
—	MF	Malaysia	Mohd Khairol Abdul Latif (from free agent)
—	MF	Malaysia	Mohd Norzie Ibrahim (from free agent)
—	MF	Malaysia	Mohd Redzuan Izwan Majid (from free agent)
—	MF	Malaysia	Nigoh Mukol (from free agent)
—	MF	Malaysia	Wan Zaman Wan Mustafa (from Kelantan FA)
—	FW	Malaysia	Mohd Amri Fazal Mat Nor (from Pos Malaysia FC)
—	MF	Malaysia	Muhammad Ridzuan Kamis (from Sime Darby FC)

Transfers (Out)

Note: Flags indicate national team as defined under FIFA eligibility rules; some limited exceptions apply. Players may hold more than one non-FIFA nationality.

No.	Pos.	Nation	Player
—	DF	Malaysia	N. Dhurai (Betaria FC)
—	DF	Malaysia	Mohd Helmi Abdul Karim (released)
—	MF	Malaysia	Muhd Yusri Yusof (released)
—	MF	Malaysia	Hafiz Jamal (released)
—	FW	Malaysia	Fazuan Abdullah (to Kuala Lumpur FA)
—	DF	Malaysia	Eddy Gapil (released)
—	FW	Malaysia	Mohd Hafiz Muhd Idrus (released)
—	MF	Malaysia	Calaste Aping (released)
—	MF	Malaysia	Nazrul Effendy Mohd Noor (released)
—	FW	Malaysia	Zakaria Abdul Rahman (released)

== Penang FA ==
Transfers (In)

Note: Flags indicate national team as defined under FIFA eligibility rules; some limited exceptions apply. Players may hold more than one non-FIFA nationality.

No.	Pos.	Nation	Player
—	GK	Malaysia	Isyafrial Ishak (from PKNS FC)
—	DF	Malaysia	Mohd Hafizuddin Zaini (from SDMS Kepala Batas FC)
—	MF	Malaysia	Hasrul Abu Bakar (from Pos Malaysia FC)
—	MF	Malaysia	Mohd Tarmizi Yusoff (from Kedah FA)
—	MF	Malaysia	Mohd Hisyam Shofi (from Perlis FA)
—	FW	Malaysia	Hasmawi Hassan (from Negeri Sembilan FA)
—	FW	Malaysia	Mohd Zaihisham Saad (from SDMS Kepala Batas FC)
—	FW	Malaysia	Muhammad Shammin Izwan Abdullah (from Free agent)
—	DF	Malaysia	Muhammad Naim Mansor (from Kuala Muda Naza FC 2009)
—	DF	Malaysia	Mohd Shukri Fadzil (from Kuala Muda Naza FC 2008)
—	GK	Malaysia	Mohd Rosyidi Sareb (from Kuala Muda Naza FC 2008)

No.	Pos.	Nation	Player
—	GK	Malaysia	Abdul Shukur Abdul Malek (from Free agent)
—	DF	Malaysia	Mohd Nizat Salleh (from Free agent)
—	DF	Malaysia	Muammar Nur Halim Rahim (from Free agent)
—	DF	Malaysia	Mohd Razif Abdul Rahim (from Free agent)
—	MF	Malaysia	Mohd Amirul Omar (from Free agent)
—	MF	Malaysia	A. Girither (from Free agent)
—	MF	Malaysia	Mohd Elmie Farhan Mohd Yusoff (from Free agent)
—	MF	Malaysia	M. Yoges (from Free agent)
—	FW	Malaysia	Ku Nazri Azuan Ku Azizan (from Free agent)
—	MF	Malaysia	Mohd Saiful Safaiz Abdul Rahman (from SDMS Kepala Batas FC)

Transfers (Out)

Note: Flags indicate national team as defined under FIFA eligibility rules; some limited exceptions apply. Players may hold more than one non-FIFA nationality.

No.	Pos.	Nation	Player
—	GK	Malaysia	Mohd Hafidz Romly (to PKNS FC)
—	GK	Malaysia	Megat Amir Faisal Al Khalidi Ibrahim (to PBAPP FC)
—	GK	Malaysia	S. Kugen (to SDMS Kepala Batas FC)
—	DF	Malaysia	Hafizi Roslee (to Release)
—	DF	Malaysia	K. Kuyilan (to PBAPP FC)
—	DF	Malaysia	Mohd Arif Fazlie Saidin (to Release)
—	DF	Malaysia	S. Sathiakumaran (to Release)
—	DF	Malaysia	Rahmat Najib Din (to Release)
—	DF	Malaysia	S. Kumaresan (to Release)
—	DF	Malaysia	S. Veenod (to USM FC)
—	DF	Malaysia	Amirul Asyraf Suhaidi (to USM FC)
—	DF	Malaysia	Muhamad Riduwan Ramli (to Release)
—	GK	Malaysia	Shaiful Azizi Anuar (to Release)
—	DF	Malaysia	A. Muniandy (to Release)
—	MF	Malaysia	Mohd Arsyah Ayob (to Release)
—	MF	Malaysia	Mohd Rizal Ahmad (to Release)
—	MF	Malaysia	R. Parameswaran (to Release)
—	MF	Malaysia	Wan Zaim Wan Azizan (to Release)
—	MF	Malaysia	Mohamad Idzwan Salim (to PBAPP FC)
—	MF	Malaysia	S. Suvinath (to Perlis FA)
—	MF	Malaysia	C. Premnath (to Betaria FC)
—	MF	Malaysia	Syamil Masdhoki (to SDMS Kepala Batas FC)
—	FW	Malaysia	Noorshahhiermiezal Sharudin (to PBAPP FC)
—	FW	Malaysia	Abdul Latiff Suhaimi (to Kedah FA)
—	FW	Malaysia	Mohd Noraslan Makhtar (to PBAPP FC)

No.	Pos.	Nation	Player
—	FW	Malaysia	Noor Azeeli Kamisan (to MP Muar FC)
—	MF	Malaysia	Muhammad Fakhrur Razi Wan Teh (to SDMS Kepala Batas FC)
—	GK	Malaysia	Mohd Zahier Johan (to Release)
—	GK	Malaysia	K. Jothisvaran (to Release)
—	DF	Malaysia	Ahmad Fareez (to Release)
—	DF	Malaysia	Mohd Daud Zo (to PBAPP FC)
—	DF	Malaysia	V. Vickneswaran (to Release)
—	DF	Malaysia	Mohd Faees Abdul Rahim (to MBJB FC)
—	DF	Malaysia	S. Saravanankumar (to Release)
—	DF	Malaysia	Mohd Shahril Salim (to Release)
—	DF	Malaysia	Tamil Selvam (to Release)
—	DF	Malaysia	Muhamad Fitri Kamal (to Sime Darby FC)
—	MF	Malaysia	Mohd Farhan Azhar (to Release)
—	MF	Malaysia	Ooi Shee Keong (to MP Muar FC)
—	MF	Malaysia	Muhamad Yusairi (to Release)
—	MF	Malaysia	Mohamed Aznil Iswadee Khairuddin (to Release)
—	MF	Malaysia	Tan Wei Yeek (to Release)
—	MF	Malaysia	Mohd Emie Rohaizad (to MBJB FC)
—	MF	Malaysia	B. Thinagaran (to MP Muar FC)
—	FW	Malaysia	R. Kumaraguru (to Release)
—	FW	Malaysia	R. Puganeswaran (to MP Muar FC)
—	FW	Malaysia	Mohd Nazrul Nakhaei (to Release)
—	FW	Malaysia	R. Gajentheran (to Release)
—	FW	Malaysia	Muhammad Syazuwan Bazelan (to Release)

== Perak FA ==
In

Note: Flags indicate national team as defined under FIFA eligibility rules; some limited exceptions apply. Players may hold more than one non-FIFA nationality.

No.	Pos.	Nation	Player
—	DF	Malaysia	Muhd Shahrom Abdul Kalam (from Kuala Lumpur FA)
—	DF	Malaysia	Mohd Badrul Azam Mohd Zamri (from Felda United FC)
—	DF	Malaysia	Mohd Nasir Basharuddin (MBI)
—	MF	Malaysia	Mohamad Rafiuddin Roddin (from Harimau Muda A)
—	FW	Serbia	Lazar Popović (from (Bosnia and Herzegovina) FK Željezničar)
—	MF	Malaysia	Fahrul Razi Kamaruddin (from Kuala Lumpur FA)

No.	Pos.	Nation	Player
—	MF	Slovakia	Michal Kubala (from (Romania) Astra Ploieşti)
—	FW	Cameroon	Albert Ebossé Bodjongo (from (Cameroon) Unisport Bafang)
—	FW	Malaysia	Mohd Failee Mohd Ghazali (from USM FC)
—	HC	South Korea	Jang Jung (from Sri Lanka)
—	DF	Malaysia	Mohd Reithaudin Awang Emran (on loan from Sabah FA)
—	DF	Malaysia	Mohd Fariss Azlan Mat Isa (on loan from Sabah FA)
—	MF	Malaysia	Zuraindey Jumai (on loan from Sabah FA)

Out

Note: Flags indicate national team as defined under FIFA eligibility rules; some limited exceptions apply. Players may hold more than one non-FIFA nationality.

No.	Pos.	Nation	Player
4	DF	Perak	Mohd Syahman Zainuddin (to Release)
5	DF	Selangor	Muhd Arif Ismail (to Sime Darby FC)
9	FW	Serbia	Lazar Popović (to Release)
11	MF	Kedah	Mohd Shahrul Hafiz Mohd Shafei (to Release)
12	FW	Perak	Khairul Izzat Jamaluddin (to MBI)
—	GKC	Perak	Abdul Talib Saidi (to Perak Football Academy)

No.	Pos.	Nation	Player
15	DF	Perak	Azmeer Yusof (to Pos Malaysia FC)
20	MF	Perak	Harizul Izuan Abdul Rani (to Release)
23	FW	Perak	Razali Umar Kandasamy (to Sime Darby FC)
27	DF	Perak	Nurul Nasriq Kamaruddin (to MBI)
24	DF	Perak	Mohd Hafiszuan Salehuddin (to Felda United)
28	FW	Selangor	Mohd Shazuan Mohd Ashraf Mathews (to Kedah FA)

== PBAPP FC ==
=== Transfers (In) ===
Note: Flags indicate national team as defined under FIFA eligibility rules; some limited exceptions apply. Players may hold more than one non-FIFA nationality.

No.	Pos.	Nation	Player
—	GK	Malaysia	Megat Amir Faisal Al Khalidi Ibrahim (from Penang FA)
—	DF	Malaysia	Mat Saiful Mohamad (from Johor FC)
—	DF	Malaysia	K. Kuyilan (from Penang FA)
—	DF	Malaysia	Zainuddin Abidin (from ATM FA)
—	MF	Malaysia	Mohd Idzwan Salim (from Penang FA)
—	MF	Malaysia	Zulhissyam Jamaluddin (from Sime Darby F.C.)
—	MF	Malaysia	S. Thinagaran (from USM FC)
—	MF	Malaysia	Mohd Hazrul Shah Abdul Hakim (from USM FC)
—	FW	Malaysia	Mohd Noraslan Makhtar (from Penang FA)

No.	Pos.	Nation	Player
—	FW	Malaysia	Noorshahhiermiezal Sharudin (from Penang FA)
—	FW	Malaysia	Mohd Daud Zo (from Penang FA)
—	FW	Malaysia	Azlan Zakaria (from Sime Darby F.C.)
—	FW	Malaysia	Mohd Farizal Rozali (from Perlis FA)

== Perlis FA ==
=== Transfers (In) ===
Note: Flags indicate national team as defined under FIFA eligibility rules; some limited exceptions apply. Players may hold more than one non-FIFA nationality.

No.	Pos.	Nation	Player
—	MF	Malaysia	S. Suvinart (from Penang FA)
—	FW	Malaysia	Shafuan Adli Shaari (from Terengganu FA)
—	FW	Malaysia	Wan Mohd Alif Khairee (from KSK Tambun Tulang FC)
—	FW	Malaysia	Mohd Khairul Ramadhan Moha Zauwawi (from KSK Tambun Tulang FC)
—	FW	Malaysia	Mustafa Amini Ismail (from Penang FA 2010)
—	MF	Malaysia	Mohd Azlan Shah Hassan Mansor Nor (from Sabah FA President's Cup Team)
—	MF	Malaysia	Khairool Anas Safri (from KSK Tambun Tulang FC)
—	DF	Malaysia	Ahmad Kamal Jamallul Rahman (from Malacca FA)
—	DF	Malaysia	Mohd Nazrin Baharuddin (from Johor FA)
—	DF	Malaysia	Mohd Hafis Mohd Fauzi (from KSK Tambun Tulang FC)
—	DF	Malaysia	Amzar Junaidi Abdul Jalil (from PBDKT T-Team FC)
—	GK	Malaysia	Mohd Khairul Azuan Rosli (from KSK Tambun Tulang FC)
—	DF	Malaysia	K. Puvinderan Naidu (from Shahzan Muda FC)
—	FW	Malaysia	Mohd Fadzwin Che Salim (from SDMS Kepala Batas FC President's Cup Team)

No.	Pos.	Nation	Player
—	MF	Malaysia	Muhd Rozaimi Azwar Mohd Noor (from Kelantan FA)
—	GK	Malaysia	Mohd Nizam Daud (from Free agent) April Transfer
—	GK	Malaysia	Khairul Nizam Hassan (from ATM FA) April Transfer
—	GK	Malaysia	Mohd Firdaus Yusof (from Kuala Lumpur FA) April Transfer
—	DF	Malaysia	Mohd Hafiz Seni (from Free agent) April Transfer
—		Malaysia	Mohd Eqbal Harizam (from Free agent) April Transfer
—		Malaysia	Mohd Faqeen Aswad Mohd Fauzi (from Free agent) April Transfer
—	MF	Malaysia	Mohd Hardi Ahmad (from Betaria FC) April Transfer
—	DF	Malaysia	Mohd Khairul Asyraf Ramli (from Harimau Muda B) April Transfer
—	MF	Malaysia	Mohd Syafiq Abdul Samad (from ATM FA) April Transfer
—	MF	Malaysia	Mohd Afandi Zamzam (from Free agent) April Transfer
—	MF	Sierra Leone	Mahmadu Alphajor Bah (from Free agent) April Transfer

=== Transfers (Out) ===
Note: Flags indicate national team as defined under FIFA eligibility rules; some limited exceptions apply. Players may hold more than one non-FIFA nationality.

No.	Pos.	Nation	Player
—	FW	Malaysia	Mohd Fadly Baharum (to Sime Darby FC)
—	DF	Malaysia	Zairul Azwan Zainudin (to Release)
—	FW	Malaysia	Samransak Kram (to Release)
—	GK	Malaysia	Reza Iqrimal Redzawan (to Release)
—	MF	Malaysia	Sanjos Sundawat (to Release)
—	DF	Malaysia	Mohd Sany Mat Isa (to Kedah FA)
—	FW	Malaysia	Mohd Farizal Rozali (to PBAPP FC)
—	MF	Malaysia	Mohd Hisyam Shofi (to Penang FA)
—	FW	Malaysia	Wan Khairul Faiz Kamaruddin (to PBDKT T-Team FC)
—	FW	Malaysia	Mohd Sharmezi Rosli (to Release)
—	FW	Malaysia	Mohd Faiz Subri (to PBDKT T-Team FC)
—	MF	Malaysia	Mohd Hafiszuan Salehuddin (to Perak FA)
—	FW	Malaysia	Tengku Mohd Adam Tengku Mohd Rosly (to Release)
—	DF	Malaysia	Azmizi Azmi (to Kedah FA)
—	GK	Malaysia	Nik Shahrul Anizan Mohamad (to Malacca FA)
—	GK	Malaysia	Mohd Amirul Rosli (to Betaria FC)
—	GK	Malaysia	Amini Ahmad Tabarani (to Release)
—	DF	Malaysia	Muhammad Munawwar Shavukath Ali (to Malacca FA)

== PKNS FC ==
Transfers (In)

Note: Flags indicate national team as defined under FIFA eligibility rules; some limited exceptions apply. Players may hold more than one non-FIFA nationality.

No.	Pos.	Nation	Player
—	GK	Malaysia	Mohd Hafidz Romly (from Penang FA)
—	GK	Malaysia	Mohd Remezey Che Ros (from Kuala Lumpur FA)
—	DF	Malaysia	Fahrul Nizwan Abdul Nasir (from ATM FA)
—	DF	Malaysia	Farouk Hashim (from Kuala Lumpur FA)
—	DF	Malaysia	Ahmad Azlan Zainal (from Kuala Lumpur FA)
—	DF	Malaysia	Farouk Hashim (from Kuala Lumpur FA)
—	DF	Malaysia	Mohd Helmi Remeli (from Terengganu FA)
—	DF	Malaysia	Muhamad Faizal Nasir (from Pos Malaysia FC)
—	MF	Brazil	Paulo Sérgio (from Free agent)

No.	Pos.	Nation	Player
—	MF	Malaysia	Mohd Fazli Baharudin (from Pahang FA)
—	MF	Malaysia	Azwan Abdul Malek (from Kuala Lumpur FA)
—	FW	Malaysia	Rudie Ramli (from Selangor FA)
—	FW	Guadeloupe	Dawood Nicoise (from Al-Masry)
—	MF	Malaysia	Mohd Norhakim Hassan (from MP Muar FC)
—	MF	Malaysia	Ibrahim Aziz (from Harimau Muda B)
—	DF	Malaysia	Mohamad Ariff Baseri (from Rapid KL FC)
—	DF	Malaysia	Mohd Azrul Ariff Mohd Ridzwan (from Selangor FA)
—	FW	Zambia	Phillimon Chepita (from Al-Jaish Damascus)

Transfers (Out)

Note: Flags indicate national team as defined under FIFA eligibility rules; some limited exceptions apply. Players may hold more than one non-FIFA nationality.

No.	Pos.	Nation	Player
—	GK	Malaysia	Isyarial Ishak (to Penang FA)
—	GK	Malaysia	Badrulzaman Abdul Halim (to Negeri Sembilan FA)
—	DF	Malaysia	Mohd Zaidi Ahmad (to Johor FA)
—	DF	Malaysia	Ahmad Tharmini Saiban (to Johor FA)
—	DF	Malaysia	Mohd Aslam Najumudeen (to Kuala Lumpur FA)
—	DF	Malaysia	Mohd Airulridzwan Razali (to Pos Malaysia FC)
—	DF	Malaysia	Hairul Nizam Haniff (to Sime Darby FC)
—	MF	Malaysia	K. Premananthan (to Pos Malaysia FC)
—	GK	Malaysia	See Tian Keat (to Release)
—	GK	Malaysia	Muhd Arshad Kamarudin (to Release)
—	DF	Malaysia	Mohd Muzammer Zaki (to Release)

No.	Pos.	Nation	Player
—	MF	Malaysia	Mohd Norhisham Hassan (to MP Muar FC)
—	MF	Malaysia	Mohd Zameer Zainun (to Kuala Lumpur FA)
—	MF	Malaysia	Abdul Rahman Abdul Kadir (to -)
—	MF	Malaysia	Christie Jayaseelan (to ATM FA)
—	FW	Malaysia	Mohammad Zamri Hassan (to Sime Darby FC)
—	FW	Malaysia	Mohd Irme Mat (to Sime Darby FC)
—	FW	Malaysia	V. Saravanan (to Retired)
—	DF	Malaysia	Khairul Shahrin Mansor (to MP Muar FC)
—	GK	Malaysia	Khairul Efsan Mat Isa (to Malacca FA)
—	DF	Malaysia	Rosdi Abu Said (to Release)
—	MF	Malaysia	Mohd Zawawi Ramali (to Release)
—	DF	Malaysia	Muhd Hashraf (to Release)

== Pos Malaysia FC ==
Transfers (In)

Note: Flags indicate national team as defined under FIFA eligibility rules; some limited exceptions apply. Players may hold more than one non-FIFA nationality.

No.	Pos.	Nation	Player
—	DF	Malaysia	Mohd Hanif Mohd Noor (from Betaria FC)
—	DF	Malaysia	Nor Nahrul Hayat Nordin (from Free agent)
—	DF	Malaysia	Mohd Aizulridzwan Razali (from PKNS FC)
—	DF	Malaysia	Azmeer Yusof (from Perak FA)
—	MF	Malaysia	Roslee Ariffin (from Free agent)
—	MF	Malaysia	K. Premananthan (from PKNS FC)
—	MF	Malaysia	Mohd Hafiz Mahadi (from Free agent)
—	MF	Malaysia	Mohd Hafizulldin Mohd Nor (from Free agent)
—	MF	Malaysia	Mohd Saddam Mohd Nor (from Kedah FA)
—	MF	Malaysia	Mohd Fakhrul Aiman Sidid (from Rapid KL FC)
—	FW	Malaysia	Aliff Hafifi Mohammad (from Rapid KL FC)
—	FW	Malaysia	Fatrurazi Rozi (from ATM FA)

Transfers (Out)

Note: Flags indicate national team as defined under FIFA eligibility rules; some limited exceptions apply. Players may hold more than one non-FIFA nationality.

No.	Pos.	Nation	Player
—	DF	Malaysia	Hafizuddin Mohd Said (to Release)
—	DF	Malaysia	Mohd Khairul Zamry Zulkeppiliy (to Release)
—	FW	Malaysia	Mohd Faizal Abdullah (to Release)
—	MF	Malaysia	Ahmad Saufi Ibrahim (to Release)
—	FW	Malaysia	Ahmad Sawai Din (to Release)
—	FW	Malaysia	Rusydee Samsuddin (to Release)
—	FW	Malaysia	Nur Adli Effendi Mohd Pauzee (to MBJB FC)
—	DF	Malaysia	Muhd Azirol Ramli (to Release)
—	MF	Malaysia	Hasrul Abu Bakar (to Penang FA)
—	FW	Malaysia	Mohd Amri Fazal Mat Nor (to PDRM FA)
—	DF	Malaysia	Muhd Faizal Nasir (to PKNS FC)
—	DF	Malaysia	Mohd Roslan Basiron (to Release)
—	MF	Malaysia	Muhd Zafran Olibullah (to Release)
—	FW	Malaysia	Mohd Elias Sulaiman (to USM FC)
—	MF	Malaysia	Hafiz Ismail (to Release)

== Rapid KL FC ==
=== Out ===
Note: Flags indicate national team as defined under FIFA eligibility rules; some limited exceptions apply. Players may hold more than one non-FIFA nationality.

No.	Pos.	Nation	Player
—	GK	Malaysia	Nor Iman Razali (to MBJB FC)
—	DF	Malaysia	Muhd Syazwan Rani (to MBJB FC)
—	MF	Malaysia	Khairul Anwar Abu (to MBJB FC)
—	MF	Malaysia	Muhammad Azreen Zulkafali (to MBJB FC)
—	FW	Malaysia	Aliff Hafifi Mohammad (to Pos Malaysia FC)
—	GK	Malaysia	Muhamad Adam Afiq Yusof (to SPA FC)

No.	Pos.	Nation	Player
—	MF	Malaysia	Mohd Fakhrul Aiman Sidid (to Pos Malaysia FC)
—	MF	Malaysia	Mohd Nur Saiful Abdul Rahman (to SPA FC)
—	DF	Malaysia	Mohamad Ariff Baseri (to PKNS FC)
—	DF	Malaysia	Mohd Fhadzil Mohd Limin (to Malacca FA)
—	MF	Malaysia	Mohd Izairie Radzi (to ATM FA)

== Sabah FA ==
=== In ===
Note: Flags indicate national team as defined under FIFA eligibility rules; some limited exceptions apply. Players may hold more than one non-FIFA nationality.

No.	Pos.	Nation	Player
—	GK	Malaysia	Nik Yus Saiddatul (from Sime Darby FC)
—	GK	Malaysia	Irwan Jamil (from Free agent)
—	DF	Malaysia	Ronny Harun (from Terengganu FA)
—	DF	Malaysia	Razid Gafar (from Kuala Lumpur FA)
—	DF	Malaysia	Mohd Fariss Azlan Mat Isa (from USM FC)
—	MF	Australia	Brendan Gan (from Bonnyrigg White Eagles)

No.	Pos.	Nation	Player
—	MF	Malaysia	Naim Ahmad (from Free agent)
—	FW	Germany	Hendrik Helmke (from IFK Mariehamn)
—	MF	Malaysia	Shahrudin Yakup (from Sime Darby FC)
—	FW	Australia	Michael Baird (from (Australia) Central Coast Mariners)
—	FW	Malaysia	Bobby Gonzales (from Sarawak FA)
—	MF	Malaysia	Sanjos Sundawat (from Perlis FA)

=== Out ===
Note: Flags indicate national team as defined under FIFA eligibility rules; some limited exceptions apply. Players may hold more than one non-FIFA nationality.

No.	Pos.	Nation	Player
—	DF	Malaysia	Hariri Mohd Safii (to Terengganu FA)
—	DF	Malaysia	Jeremy Matthew Danker (to Johor FA)
—	FW	Malaysia	Mohd Farid Ideris (to Johor FC)
—	DF	Malaysia	Gasili Pengalot (Released)
—	GK	Malaysia	Basri Sappe (Released)
—	GK	Malaysia	Jaidi Umbong (Released)
—	GK	Malaysia	Shairul Boidi (Released)

No.	Pos.	Nation	Player
—	DF	Malaysia	M. Sivakumar (to Felda United FC)
—	GK	Malaysia	Mohd Salawi Ahmad Jasad (Released)
—	FW	Malaysia	Stanley Bernard Stephen Samuel (to Kuala Lumpur FA)
—	DF	Malaysia	Ahmad Saidi (Released)
—	DF	Malaysia	Nelbandy Abdul Rahman (Released)
—	DF	Malaysia	Razitaman Kaalam (Released)
—	MF	Australia	Michael Baird (Released)

== Sarawak FA ==
=== In ===
Note: Flags indicate national team as defined under FIFA eligibility rules; some limited exceptions apply. Players may hold more than one non-FIFA nationality.

No.	Pos.	Nation	Player
—	GK	Malaysia	Saiful Amar Sudar (from Selangor FA)
—	DF	Cameroon	Guy Bwele (from Coton Sport FC de Garoua)
—	FW	Cameroon	Kalle Sone (from CS Otopeni)
—	MF	Malaysia	Shahrol Malek (from Free agent)
—	FW	Croatia	Vedran Muratovic (from Free agent)
—	DF	Malaysia	Ramesh Lai Ban Huat (from Felda United FC)
—	DF	Malaysia	Yosri Derma Raju (from Selangor FA)

No.	Pos.	Nation	Player
—	MF	Malaysia	Ronald Dennis (from Free agent)
—	MF	Malaysia	Mohd Azizan Baba (from Johor FC)
—	MF	Malaysia	K. Rajan (from Felda United FC)
—	GK	Malaysia	Sani Anuar Kamsani (from MP Muar FC)
—	FW	Malaysia	Mohd Rasyid Aya (from Johor FC)
—	MF	Malaysia	K. Depan Sakwati (from Selangor FA)
—	FW	Malaysia	K. Ravindran (from Harimau Muda A)

=== Out ===
Note: Flags indicate national team as defined under FIFA eligibility rules; some limited exceptions apply. Players may hold more than one non-FIFA nationality.

No.	Pos.	Nation	Player
—	GK	Malaysia	Abdul Gani Annuar (to Release)
—	DF	Malaysia	Hamidin Manap (to Release)
—	DF	Malaysia	Hafizal Marzuki (to Release)
—	MF	Malaysia	Mohd Sharizan Sahari (to Release)
—	FW	Cameroon	Kalle Sone (to Release)
—	MF	Malaysia	Abang Mohd Za'afari Abang Othman (to Sarawak FA Youth Coach)
—	DF	Malaysia	Shahrizam Mohamad (to Release)
—	FW	Malaysia	Bobby Gonzales (to Sabah FA)
—	FW	Malaysia	Abdul Rayjal Jalil (to MP Muar FC)
—	MF	Malaysia	Wong Sai Kong (to Release)
—	GK	Malaysia	Mohd Shamshul Fahmie (to Release)
—	GK	Malaysia	Azlen Ahmad Jabri (to Release)
—	MF	Malaysia	Mohd Syaiful Sabtu (to MP Muar FC)
—	GK	Malaysia	Patrick Aji (to Release)
—	GK	Malaysia	Felex Japi Saging (to Release)
—	DF	Malaysia	Mohd Al Hajis Drus (to Release)

No.	Pos.	Nation	Player
—	DF	Malaysia	Micah Lobo (to Release)
—	DF	Malaysia	Desmond Kemua Ujang (to Release)
—	DF	Malaysia	Ahmad Shakri Tuah (to Release)
—	DF	Malaysia	Sylvester Ruba (to Release)
—	DF	Malaysia	Aldrige Dato (to Release)
—	DF	Malaysia	Morris Jagan (to Release)
—	MF	Malaysia	Kemelia Kayang Bapi (to Release)
—	MF	Malaysia	Mahadi Razak (to Release)
—	MF	Malaysia	Paul Sambang (to Release)
—	MF	Malaysia	Zulfakar Akram (to Release)
—	MF	Malaysia	Fugerson Sokolingam (to Release)
—	MF	Malaysia	Mansor Keram (to Release)
—	FW	Malaysia	Izray Iffarul Roslan (to Release)
—	FW	Malaysia	Mohd Hafiz Abu Bakar (to Release)
—	FW	Malaysia	Mohd Hadera Bakri (to Release)

== SDMS Kepala Batas FC ==
=== In ===
Note: Flags indicate national team as defined under FIFA eligibility rules; some limited exceptions apply. Players may hold more than one non-FIFA nationality.

No.	Pos.	Nation	Player
—	MF	Malaysia	Mohd Adam Sulaiman (promote from President's Cup Team)
—	MF	Malaysia	Safuan Azwan Abdul Shukor (promote from President's Cup Team)
—	MF	Malaysia	Mohd Aliff Ezzwan Badrulhisham (promote from President's Cup Team)
—	DF	Malaysia	Asnawi Razak (promote from President's Cup Team)
—	MF	Malaysia	Mohd Shafiz Ramli (promote from President's Cup Team)
—	MF	Malaysia	Muhd Danial Jamaluddin (promote from President's Cup Team)
—	FW	Malaysia	Muhammad Farhan Mustafa (from Perlis FA President's Cup Team)
—	FW	Malaysia	Mohd Hafiz Mohd Hashim (from -)
—	FW	Malaysia	Wan Muhd Imm Intizam Wan Zulkifli (from -)

No.	Pos.	Nation	Player
—	GK	Malaysia	S. Kugen (from Penang FA)
—	GK	Malaysia	T. Harashan (from Free agent)
—	DF	Malaysia	Azhariridzuan Alias (from Johor FA)
—	DF	Malaysia	Mohd Mustaqim Razak (from -)
—	DF	Malaysia	Mohammad Rahimi Rahim (from -)
—	DF	Malaysia	Khairol Naim Salim (from -)
—	DF	Malaysia	S. Pannirselvam (promote from President's Cup Team)
—	MF	Malaysia	Mohd Yusri Mustafa (from Malacca FA)
—	MF	Malaysia	Syamil Masdhoki (from Penang FA)
—	MF	Malaysia	Muhammad Fakhrur Razi Wan Teh (from Penang FA)

=== Out ===
Note: Flags indicate national team as defined under FIFA eligibility rules; some limited exceptions apply. Players may hold more than one non-FIFA nationality.

No.	Pos.	Nation	Player
—	GK	Malaysia	Jali Ngat Demin (to Release)
—	GK	Malaysia	Harith Hakeem Nor Hisham (to Release)
—	GK	Malaysia	Muhammad Nazirul Ahmad (to Release)
—	DF	Malaysia	Nur Muhamad Muzaffar Ahmad Bustamam (to Release)
—	DF	Malaysia	S. Thanaraj (to Release)
—	DF	Malaysia	Mohd Shahril Misman (to MBJB FC)
—	MF	Malaysia	K. Ravindran (to Release)
—	DF	Malaysia	Azrizan Ahmad (to Release)
—	MF	Malaysia	R. Yugarajan (to Release)
—	DF	Malaysia	Mohd Hafizuddin Zaini (to Penang FA)
—	MF	Malaysia	K. Khirubakaran (to Release)
—	DF	Malaysia	Rosley Wasli (to Release)
—	DF	Malaysia	Mohd Nasaruddin Sarini (to Release)
—	MF	Malaysia	Mohd Zamir Musa (to Release)
—	MF	Malaysia	S. Thevan (to Release)
—	MF	Malaysia	Mohd A'fif Mohd Thahir (to Release)
—	FW	Malaysia	Azman Nizam Abdullah (to Release)
—	MF	Malaysia	Ronny Antuniaas (to Release)
—	MF	Malaysia	Ibrahim Ani (to Release)
—	DF	Malaysia	Mohd Reduan Awang (to Release)

No.	Pos.	Nation	Player
—	DF	Malaysia	Megat Hasliq Fitri Mohd Hasni (to Release)
—	MF	Malaysia	Badrul Hisyam Mohd Suffian (to Release)
—	DF	Malaysia	Salman Duan (to Release)
—	FW	Malaysia	Mohd Shafarin Nawawi (to Release)
—	FW	Malaysia	Safrul Hafizzad Safari (to Release)
—	FW	Malaysia	Zainal Jakaria (to Release)
—	DF	Malaysia	M. Jagen (to Release)
—	DF	Malaysia	Mohd Nor Hamidon (to Release)
—	GK	Malaysia	Safril Hafizzie Safari (to Release)
—	DF	Malaysia	Mohd Fadzil Mohd Mahyuddin (to Release)
—	MF	Malaysia	Mohd Saiful Safaiz (to Penang President's Cup Team)
—	FW	Malaysia	Wan Amin Raimi Wan Abdullah (to ATM FA President's Cup Team)
—	FW	Malaysia	Mohd Zaihiham Saad (to Penang FA)
—	FW	Malaysia	Mohd Fadzwin Che Salim (to Perlis FA)
—	FW	Malaysia	Mohd Ikram Ibrahim (to Sime Darby FC)
—	FW	Malaysia	Mohd Rahmad Ahmad (to ATM FA)
—	GK	Malaysia	Mohammad Fariduan Othman (to Release)
—	MF	Malaysia	Mohd Hasni Hakim Hamid (to -)
—	MF	Malaysia	Muhammad Kamil Abdul Rahman (to -)

== Selangor FA ==
=== Transfers (In) ===
Note: Flags indicate national team as defined under FIFA eligibility rules; some limited exceptions apply. Players may hold more than one non-FIFA nationality.

No.	Pos.	Nation	Player
—	GK	Malaysia	G. Jeevananthan (from USM FC)
—	GK	Malaysia	Norazlan Razali (from Kuala Lumpur FA)
—	DF	Malaysia	Khairul Anuar Khalid (promote from Selangor FA President's Cup Team)
—	DF	Lebanon	Ramez Dayoub (from Magway)
—	DF	Malaysia	Muhammad Ariff Zulkifly (from Harimau Muda B)
—	DF	Malaysia	Ahmad Faizal Sumar (from Harimau Muda B)
—	DF	India	Gouramangi Singh (from Prayag United)
—	MF	Malaysia	Mohd Hasmarul Fadzir Hassan (from Felda United FC)
—	MF	Malaysia	Solehin Kanasian Abdullah (from Kelantan FA)
—	MF	Malaysia	Zaiful Abdul Hakim (from Harimau Muda B)

No.	Pos.	Nation	Player
—	MF	Malaysia	K. Gurusamy (from Harimau Muda A)
—	FW	Malaysia	R. Surendran (from Pahang FA)
—	FW	Malaysia	Famirul Asyraf Sayuti (from Pahang FA)
—	FW	Malaysia	Wan Mohd Hoesne Wan Hussain (from Johor FC)
—	FW	Malaysia	Adib Aizuddin Abdul Latif (from Johor FA)
—	FW	DR Congo	Lelo Mbele (from Al-Nasr Benghazi)
—	FW	Malaysia	Muhammad Nazrul Kamaruzzaman (from Harimau Muda B)
—	FW	Croatia	Boško Balaban (from Panionios F.C.)

=== Transfers (Out) ===
Note: Flags indicate national team as defined under FIFA eligibility rules; some limited exceptions apply. Players may hold more than one non-FIFA nationality.

No.	Pos.	Nation	Player
—	GK	Malaysia	Mohd Iqbal Suhaimi (to PBDKT T-Team FC)
—	GK	Malaysia	Saiful Amar Sudar (to Sarawak FA)
—	GK	Malaysia	Mohd Azrul Hafiz Amran (to ATM FA)
—	GK	Malaysia	Muhammad Syafizullah Abdul Wahab (to Sime Darby FC)
—	DF	Malaysia	Khairul Anuar Baharom (to Retired)
—	DF	Malaysia	D. Surendran (Released)
—	DF	Malaysia	Yosri Derma Raju (to Sarawak FA)
—	DF	Malaysia	Muhammad Asyraf Khairudin (to MBJB FC)
—	MF	Malaysia	K. Depan Sakwati (to Sarawak FA)
—	FW	DR Congo	Lelo Mbele (Released)
—	MF	Malaysia	Mohammad Hardi Jaafar (to Felda United FC)
—	MF	Malaysia	Muhammad Zulhisyam Mohd Safian (to MBJB FC)
—	MF	Malaysia	Muhamad Saifullah Ismail (to UiTM FC)
—	MF	Malaysia	Syafiq Azri Ahmad Kamal (to ATM FA)
—	FW	Malaysia	S. Sritharan (Released)
—	FW	Malaysia	Rudie Ramli (to PKNS FC)

No.	Pos.	Nation	Player
—	FW	Malaysia	Mohd Fadzli Saari (to PBDKT T-Team FC)
—	FW	Malaysia	Mohamad Amiruddin Mohd Taib (to MP Muar FC)
—	FW	Malaysia	Mohd Akbar Khamis (to Malacca FA)
—	GK	Malaysia	Amzar Ahmad (to Release)
—	DF	Malaysia	Mohd Azrul Ariff Mohd Ridzwan (to PKNS FC)
—	MF	Malaysia	Mohd Hafif Azhar (to Malacca FA)
—	MF	Malaysia	Mohd Jamiuddin Jamaluddin (to Release)
—	DF	Malaysia	K. Thiyagaraja (to Release)
—	DF	Malaysia	G. Ganesan (to Kuala Lumpur FA)
—	DF	Malaysia	Muhamad Jafrizan Mat Jid (to Release)
—	FW	Malaysia	Mazwan Yaacob (to Malinja FC)
—	MF	Malaysia	A. Puvanarajah (to Sime Darby FC)
—	DF	Malaysia	K. Prabakaran (to Sime Darby FC)
—	MF	Malaysia	Choi Soon Seng (to Release)
—	FW	Malaysia	Mohd Azrul Hafiq Amran (to Release)

== Shahzan Muda FC ==
=== Transfers (In) ===
Note: Flags indicate national team as defined under FIFA eligibility rules; some limited exceptions apply. Players may hold more than one non-FIFA nationality.

No.	Pos.	Nation	Player
—	GK	Malaysia	Mohd Sheril Anuar Saini (from)
—	DF	Malaysia	Mohd Faisal Mohd Rosli (from)
—	DF	Malaysia	Mat Hafis Mat Ariffin (from PBDKT T-Team FC President's Cup Team)
—	MF	Malaysia	Mohd Sukri Jaafar (from)
—	MF	Malaysia	Ammar Anuwar (from)
—	FW	Malaysia	Azrul Abdul Rahim (from)
—	DF	Malaysia	Mohamad Syukri Supiam (from)
—	DF	Malaysia	Mohd Zarrin Ashraff Mohd Nazri (from)

No.	Pos.	Nation	Player
—	MF	Malaysia	Nor Abdah Alif Nazarudin (from)
—	MF	Malaysia	Mohd Firdaus Zawawi (from)
—	FW	Malaysia	Ahmad Zaimee Mohd Zahir (from)
—	FW	Malaysia	Muhammad Hariz Fazrin Mohd Nazri (from)
—	DF	Malaysia	Ahmad Rizal Roseli (from)
—	FW	Malaysia	Mohd Rizua Shafiqi Kamaruzzaman (from)
—	GK	Malaysia	Muhammad Amirul Asraff Asmawi (from)

Transfers (Out)

Note: Flags indicate national team as defined under FIFA eligibility rules; some limited exceptions apply. Players may hold more than one non-FIFA nationality.

No.	Pos.	Nation	Player
—	GK	Malaysia	Mohd Saufi Mohd Suffian (released)
—	MF	Malaysia	Ahmad Shamsuri Bazlan (released)
—	FW	Malaysia	Muhd Noorhakiroy Bahari (released)
—	FW	Malaysia	Zulkiram Redzwan (Melodi Jaya Sports Club)
—	MF	Malaysia	Mohd Ivan Yusoff (released)
—	DF	Malaysia	Khairul Azman Awang Long (to Pahang FA)
—	MF	Malaysia	Mohd Hafiz Kamal (to Pahang FA)
—	MF	Malaysia	Mohd Hazuan Mohd Daud (to Pahang FA)

No.	Pos.	Nation	Player
—	FW	Malaysia	Mohd Fauzi Roslan (to Pahang FA)
—	MF	Malaysia	Abdul Wafiy Abdul Ghafar (to Pahang FA)
—	DF	Malaysia	K. Puvinderan Naidu (to Perlis FA)
—	DF	Malaysia	Mohd Hafidh Abdul (to -)
—	DF	Malaysia	Rizal Irwan Mohd Rosdi (to Release)
—	MF	Malaysia	Zulhilmi Othman (to -)

== Sime Darby F.C. ==
=== In ===
- (Liberia) Patrick Wleh from LISCR F.C.
- (Malaysia) Mohd Fadly Baharum from Perlis FA
- (Malaysia) Razali Umar Kandasamy from Perak FA
- (Malaysia) Mohd Asyraf Al-Japri from Johor FA
- (Malaysia) Muhd Arif Ismail from Perak FA
- (Malaysia) Mohammad Zamri Hassan from PKNS FC
- (Malaysia) Mohd Irme Mat from PKNS FC
- (Malaysia) Hairul Nizam Haniff from PKNS FC
- (Malaysia) Mohd Shoufiq Mohamad Kusaini from Johor FA
- (Malaysia) Rosli Muda from PBDKT T-Team FC
- (Malaysia) Mohd Shazlan Alias from PBDKT T-Team FC
- (Malaysia) Mohd Asrol Ibrahim from UiTM FC
- (Malaysia) Azmirul Azmi promote from Sime Darby FC President's Cup Team
- (Malaysia) Muhammad Syafizullah Abdul Wahab from Selangor FA
- (Malaysia) Muhd Fitri Kamal from Penang FA
- (Malaysia) K. Prabakaran from Selangor FA
- (Malaysia) A. Puvanarajah from Selangor FA
- (Malaysia) Mohd Hafizan Talib from Terengganu FA
- (Malaysia) M. Ganeswaran from Kuala Lumpur FA
- (Malaysia) Mohd Ikram Ibrahim from SDMS Kepala Batas FC

=== Out ===
- (Malaysia) S. Muneswaran to Malacca FA President's Cup Team
- (Malaysia) S. Kalai Arasu to Perak FA President's Cup Team
- (Malaysia) Ahmad Bukhari Ahmad Termizi to MP Muar FC President's Cup Team
- (Malaysia) Wan Mohd Aiman Wan Rafiee to MBJB FC
- (Malaysia) Nik Yus Saiddatul to Sabah FA President's Cup Team
- Mohd Saiful Mustafa to Pos Malaysia FC
- (Malaysia) Azlan Zakaria to PBAPP FC
- (Malaysia) Razlan Joffri Ali to Release
- (Malaysia) Mohizam Shah Dawood Shah to Release
- (Malaysia) K. Sivabalan to Release
- (Malaysia) K. Linggam to Release
- (Malaysia) Mohd Farkhis Fisol to Release
- (Malaysia) A. Varathan to ATM FA
- (Malaysia) Mohd Rizzat Mohd Nor to Release
- (Malaysia) Zulkifli Sulaiman to Release
- (Malaysia) Zulhissyam Jamaluddin to PBAPP FC
- (Malaysia) Mohd Raimi Mohd Nor to Felda United FC
- (Malaysia) Mohd Faizal Mansor to Johor FA
- (Malaysia) Shahrudin Yakup to Sabah FA
- (Malaysia) Mohd Yusri Abas to Johor FA
- (Malaysia) Azrine Efendy Sa'duddin to Betaria FC
- (Malaysia) Muhammad Ridzuan Kamis to PDRM FA
- (Malaysia) E. Lohindran to Release
- (Malaysia) Abdul Rahman Nawarwy to Release
- (Malaysia) Raslam Khan Abdul Rashid to Release
- (Malaysia) Mohd Zamirul Zamri to Release
- (Malaysia) Amir Ikhmal Zuhaimi to Release
- (Malaysia) Muhammad Aminul Hakim to Release
- (Malaysia) Mohd Firdaus Harun to Release

== Terengganu FA ==
=== Transfers in ===
Note: Flags indicate national team as defined under FIFA eligibility rules; some limited exceptions apply. Players may hold more than one non-FIFA nationality.

No.	Pos.	Nation	Player
—	DF	Malaysia	Mohd Faizal Muhammad (from Harimau Muda A)
—	DF	Malaysia	Mohd Muslim Ahmad (from Harimau Muda A)
—	MF	Malaysia	Shamsul Kamal Mohd (from PBDKT T-Team FC)
—	MF	Malaysia	Hariri Mohd Safii (from Sabah FA)
—	MF	Malaysia	Mohd Humaidi Adzmi (from PBDKT T-Team FC)

No.	Pos.	Nation	Player
—	MF	Malaysia	Abdul Shukur Jusoh (from Harimau Muda A)
—	MF	Brazil	Baiano (from Slavia Sofia)
—	FW	Liberia	Francis Doe (from Al-Ahly)
—	MF	Malaysia	Syed Sobri Syed Mohamad (from SSBJ)
—	FW	Malaysia	Muhammad Amirul Syahmi Ashari (from SSBJ)

=== Transfers out ===
Note: Flags indicate national team as defined under FIFA eligibility rules; some limited exceptions apply. Players may hold more than one non-FIFA nationality.

No.	Pos.	Nation	Player
—	DF	Malaysia	Ronny Harun (to Sabah FA)
—	DF	Malaysia	Mohd Helmi Remeli (to PKNS FC)
—	DF	Malaysia	Mohd Hassan Basri Ahmad Ridzuan (to PBDKT T-Team FC)

No.	Pos.	Nation	Player
—	MF	Malaysia	Zharif Hasna (to PBDKT T-Team FC)
—	MF	Malaysia	Wan Muhamad Aliff Wan Jasmi (to PBDKT T-Team FC)
—	MF	Malaysia	Mohd Hafizan Talib (to Sime Darby F.C.)

== UiTM FC ==
=== Transfers (In) ===
Note: Flags indicate national team as defined under FIFA eligibility rules; some limited exceptions apply. Players may hold more than one non-FIFA nationality.

No.	Pos.	Nation	Player
—	GK	Malaysia	Norhadi Ubaidillah (from Kelantan FA)
—	GK	Malaysia	Mohd Fadzli Mohd Nor (from -)
—	GK	Malaysia	Muhammad Hanif Saied (from Negeri Sembilan FA)
—	GK	Malaysia	Afiff Aizad Azman (from Johor FA)
—	DF	Malaysia	Adam Othman (from -)
—	DF	Malaysia	Muhammad Firdaus Paris (from Pahang FA President's Cup Team 2010)
—	MF	Malaysia	Mohamad Shafiq Mohd Mokhtar (from -)
—	MF	Malaysia	Mohd Naqhie Che Ariffin (from -)
—	MF	Malaysia	Nik Mohd Faris Iskandar Che Mohd Za'ba (from -)
—	FW	Malaysia	Muhd Ruzaini Jamaluddin (from Sime Darby FC President's Cup Team)
—	FW	Malaysia	Mohd Adam Syahir Rosli (from Negeri Sembilan FA President's Cup Team)
—	FW	Malaysia	Muhd Saifullah Ismail (from Selangor FA President's Cup Team)
—	MF	Malaysia	Muhammad Afham Zulkipeli (from Kelantan FA President's Cup Team 2010)

=== Transfers (Out) ===
Note: Flags indicate national team as defined under FIFA eligibility rules; some limited exceptions apply. Players may hold more than one non-FIFA nationality.

No.	Pos.	Nation	Player
—	DF	Malaysia	Amirizwan Taj Tajuddin (to ATM FA)
—	GK	Malaysia	Mohamad Izwan Mohamad Rosli (to Release)
—	MF	Malaysia	Mohd Syafiq Aizat Abdul Aziz (to Release)
—	MF	Malaysia	Mohd Asrol Ibrahim (to Sime Darby FC)
—	DF	Malaysia	Mohd Kuizwan Mohd Johari (to Release)
—	MF	Malaysia	Muhd Fiqri Abdullah (to Release)
—	GK	Malaysia	Mohammad Firdaus Abdul Rozak (to Release)

== USM FC ==
=== Transfers (In) ===
Note: Flags indicate national team as defined under FIFA eligibility rules; some limited exceptions apply. Players may hold more than one non-FIFA nationality.

No.	Pos.	Nation	Player
—	GK	Malaysia	Muhammad Al-Hafiz Hamzah (from Kedah FA)
—	DF	Malaysia	Darwira Sazan (from Free agent)
—	DF	Malaysia	Mohd Fitri Jamaluddin (from Kuala Lumpur FA)
—	FW	Malaysia	Elias Sulaiman (from Pos Malaysia FC)
—	FW	Malaysia	Mohd Hafiz Abdul Rahman (from Perak FA)
—	DF	Malaysia	Muhamad Shafiq Safarudin (from Free agent)
—	MF	Malaysia	Zulhilme Mohd Fauzi (from Free agent)
—	FW	Malaysia	Khairul Anwar Idris (from Free agent)
—	MF	Malaysia	Muhd Faizat Mohd Ghazli (from Free agent)
—	DF	Malaysia	M. Prakash (from Free agent)
—	MF	Malaysia	S. Veenod (from Penang FA)
—	FW	Malaysia	Abdul Hadi Abu Bakar (from Free agent)
—	GK	Malaysia	Amirul Asyraf Mohd Suhaidi (from Penang FA)
—	MF	Uganda	Kaye Edrisar (from Express FC)
—	DF	Malaysia	Mohd Shaiful Azrin Shamsudin (from T-Team FC)

=== Transfers (Out) ===
Note: Flags indicate national team as defined under FIFA eligibility rules; some limited exceptions apply. Players may hold more than one non-FIFA nationality.

No.	Pos.	Nation	Player
—	GK	Malaysia	G. Jeevananthan (to Selangor FA)
—	MF	Malaysia	Mohd Taufiq Mohd Akhir (to Release)
—	GK	Malaysia	Mohd Hisham Jainuddin (to Release)
—	DF	Malaysia	Mohd Shahril Sidek (to Release)
—	MF	Malaysia	Mohd Hazrul Shah Abdul Hakim (to PBAPP FC)
—	FW	Malaysia	Mohd Hafiz Abdul Rahman (to Release)
—	DF	Malaysia	Mohd Fahmi Mohd Yusoff (to Release)
—	MF	Malaysia	S. Thinagaran (to PBAPP FC)
—	DF	Malaysia	Ang Choon Sai (to Release)
—	MF	Malaysia	Manzoor Azwira Abdul Wahid (to USM FC Fitness Coach)
