= 2011 Malaysia FAM League =

Malaysia FAM League
- Season: 2011
- Champions: Betaria FC
- Promoted: Betaria FC, MBJB FC
- Relegated: –
- Biggest home win: Malacca FA 6–0 TUDM Hornet FC (12 June 2011)
- Biggest away win: Melodi Jaya Sports Club 1–7 Rapid KL FC (17 April 2011)
- Highest scoring: Melodi Jaya Sports Club 1–7 Rapid KL FC (8 Goals)

2011 FAM League is the 59th edition season of current third-tier league competition in Malaysia.

The league winner for 2011 season is Betaria FC.

== Teams ==
The following teams participated in the 2011 Malaysia FAM League. In order by the number given by FAM:-

- 1 Malacca FA
- 2 Tentera Darat F.A.
- 3 (Kuala Lumpur) Rapid KL FC
- 4 TUDM Hornet FC
- 5 (Selangor) UiTM FC
- 6 (Kuala Lumpur) KL SPA FC
- 7 (Johor) Melodi Jaya Sports Club
- 8 (Johor) MBJB FC
- 9 Kor RAMD FC
- 10 (Pahang) Shahzan Muda FC
- 11 Negeri Sembilan Betaria FC

== Season changes ==
The following teams have changed division since the 2010 season.

=== To Malaysia FAM League ===
Relegated from 2010 Malaysia Premier League

- Malacca FA
- (Pahang) Shahzan Muda FC

New Team

- Tentera Darat F.A.
- (Kuala Lumpur) Rapid KL FC
- TUDM Hornet FC
- Kor RAMD FC
- Negeri Sembilan Betaria FC

=== From Malaysia FAM League ===
Promoted to 2011 Malaysia Premier League

- (Kuala Lumpur) Sime Darby
- (Penang) SDMS Kepala Batas

Teams withdrawn

- (Selangor) Juara Ban Hoe Leong FC
- (Perlis) KSK Tambun Tulang FC

== League table ==
Pos	Team	Pld	W	D	L	GF	GA	GD	Pts	Promotion
1	Negeri Sembilan Betaria FC	20	14	3	3	49	26	+23	45	Promotion to 2012 Malaysia Premier League
2	Johor MBJB FC	20	12	5	3	37	24	+13	41	Promotion to 2012 Malaysia Premier League
3	Tentera Darat F.A.	20	10	5	5	45	29	+16	35	
4	Shahzan Muda FC	20	9	8	3	37	22	+15	35	
5	Kuala Lumpur Rapid FC	20	9	5	6	37	24	+13	32	Withdrew from FAM League.
6	Malacca FA	20	7	5	8	45	40	+5	26	
7	UiTM FC	20	5	9	6	27	27	0	24	
8	Kuala Lumpur SPA FC	20	6	6	8	31	36	−5	24	
9	Kor RAMD FC	20	7	3	10	27	33	−6	24	Withdrew from FAM League.
10	TUDM Hornet FC	20	2	3	15	14	45	−31	9	Withdrew from FAM League.
11	Johor Melodi Jaya Sports Club	20	1	4	15	15	58	−43	7	

Updated to match(es) played on 22 May 2011. Source: Malaysia Football Dimos
Rules for classification: 1) points; 2) goal difference; 3) number of goals scored.
