= C. Premnath =

Malaysian footballer

Personal information
- Full name: Premnath a/l Chandran
- Date of birth: 23 May 1989 (age 37)
- Place of birth: Selangor, Malaysia
- Position: Striker

Team information
- Current team: MISC-MIFA
- Number: 14

Youth career
- 2009–2010: Selangor

Senior career*
Years	Team	Apps	(Gls)
2009–2010	Selangor	26	(7)
2011	Penang	27	(11)
2011	→ Sime Darby FC (loan)	4	(0)
2012–2013	Betaria FC	4	(1)
2014–	MISC-MIFA		
- * Club domestic league appearances and goals as of 29 December 2015 ‡ National team caps and goals as of 29 December 2015

Premnath a/l Chandran (born 23 May 1989) is a Malaysian footballer, currently playing for MISC-MIFA.

He was a Selangor President Cup product. He made his senior league debut for Selangor against Perlis in a Malaysia Super League match on 10 February 2009. He scored his first league goal for Selangor against Kelantan on 28 February 2009. He also played in the 2009 Malaysia FA Cup competition, appearing in 4 games and scoring 1 goal against Perak.

He moved to Penang FA in 2011, but he suffered relegation with the team to 2012 Malaysia FAM League. He moved on loan to Sime Darby FC for the 2011 Malaysia Cup campaign.

Premnath changed clubs again in 2012, this time to 2011 Malaysia FAM League champions Betaria FC who were promoted to the 2012 Malaysia Premier League.
