= Baharum =

Baharum is a name and may refer to:

Given name

- Baharum Mohamed (born 1957), a Member of Parliament for Malaysia

Surname

- Mariam Baharum (1935–2010), Singapore-Malay film actress
- Mohd Fadly Baharum (born 1988), Malaysian footballer
- Mohd Johari Baharum (born 1954), Malaysian politician
- Norshahliza Baharum (born 1987), Malaysian badminton player
