= Fariss Azlan Mat Isa =

Malaysian footballer

Mohd Fariss Azlan
Personal information
- Full name: Mohd Fariss Azlan Bin Mat Isa
- Date of birth: 6 August 1984 (age 42)
- Place of birth: Kedah, Malaysia
- Height: 1.80 m (5 ft 11 in)
- Position: Defender

Team information
- Current team: Kuala Lumpur United
- Number: 20

Youth career
- 2001–2003: Perlis FA

Senior career*
Years	Team	Apps	(Gls)
2004–2006	TNB Kelantan FC		
2007–2008	Kuala Muda NAZA FC	29	(0)
2009	Sabah FA	6	(0)
2010–2011	USM FC	35	(1)
2011	→Sabah FA (loan)	8	(0)
2012–	Sabah FA	5	(0)
2012	→Perak FA (loan)	4	(0)
2013–2014	Kedah FA	6	(0)
2014–	Kuala Lumpur United		
- * Club domestic league appearances and goals as of 9 May 2014 ‡ National team caps and goals as of 9 May 2014

Mohd Fariss Azlan Mat Isa (born 6 August 1984) is a Malaysian footballer who currently plays as a defender for Kuala Lumpur United.

== Career ==
He started his professional career at Kelantan based club TNB Kelantan FC in 2004, after spending 3 years in the youth setup of Perlis FA. During his time with Perlis FA, he also participated in 2002 SUKMA Games football competition playing for state of Perlis.

After TNB Kelantan pulled out of the league in 2006, he returned to his home state Kedah to join Gurun based club Kuala Muda NAZA FC. With NAZA FC, he won the Malaysia Premier League 2007-08 championship.

He played for Sabah in the 2009 season, making his debut for Sabah in the match against Sinar Dimaja Mai Sarah FC which Sabah won 2–0. A year later, he switched club to the newly promoted to 2010 Malaysia Premier League team USM FC.

He signed a new contract with Sabah FA for 2012 season as a regular player, after joining them for the 2011 Malaysia Cup campaign on loan from USM FC. He joined Perak FA on loan for the 2012 Malaysia Cup competition, as Sabah failed to qualify for the competition. He also suffered relegation with Sabah in the same season.

He returned home once more in 2013, this time to join Kedah FA. In November 2014, he moved to Kuala Lumpur United
