= K. Depan Sakwati =

Malaysian footballer

Personal information
- Full name: Depan Sakwati a/l Kandasamy
- Date of birth: 17 October 1987 (age 39)
- Place of birth: Selangor, Malaysia
- Position: Midfielder

Senior career*
Years	Team	Apps	(Gls)
2007–2008	unknown club		
2008–2009	UPB-MyTeam FC		
2009–2010	Malacca FA		
2011	Selangor FA		
2012	Sarawak FA	1	(0)
2013	Betaria FC		
2014–2016	MISC-MIFA		
- * Club domestic league appearances and goals

K. Depan Sakwati (born 17 October 1987) is a Malaysian football player.

== Career ==
He recently played for MISC-MIFA from 2014 to 2016. Previously he played for Betaria FC. He also has played for several teams including UPB-MyTeam FC, Malacca FA, Selangor FA and Sarawak FA.

== Personal life ==
He is the older brother of Selangor FA and Malaysia national football team player, K. Gurusamy.
