= Abdul Aziz Ismail =

Malaysian footballer (born 1981)

Personal information
- Full name: Abdul Aziz bin Ismail
- Date of birth: 12 June 1981 (age 45)
- Place of birth: Tasek Gelugor, Penang, Malaysia
- Position: Defender

Youth career
- 2000: Penang U-21

Senior career*
Years	Team	Apps	(Gls)
2001–2006	Penang	?	(1)
2006–2007	TMFC	?	(0)
2007–2008	Perlis	?	(0)
2009	ATM	?	(0)
2010	Sarawak	?	(0)
2011	Betaria FC		
2012	MP Muar		

International career
2003–2004	Malaysia	4	(0)
- * Club domestic league appearances and goals

Abdul Aziz Ismail (born 12 June 1981) is a retired Malaysian professional football player.

He is the former member of Malaysia national team and Malaysia under-23 national team. He represented the Malaysia national under-23 team in the 2001 and 2003 Southeast Asian Games. He also played in the 2004 AFC Asian Cup qualifier in 2003 and 2006 World Cup qualifier in 2004 with Malaysia senior team.

== Honours ==
=== Penang FA ===
- Malaysia Premier 1 League: 2001
