= 2012 Malaysia FAM League =

Malaysian football league season

Malaysia FAM League
- Season: 2012
- Champions: KL SPA FC
- Promoted: KL SPA FC
- Relegated: –
- Matches: 72
- Goals: 197 (2.74 per match)

The 2012 FAM League is the sixtieth season of the FAM League since its establishment in 1952. The season began on 3 March 2012 and is due to end on 1 July 2012. Betaria are the defending champions, having won their 1st league title the previous season. A total of 9 teams are contesting in the league.

== Teams ==
The following teams participated in the 2012 Malaysia FAM League. In order by the number given by FAM:-

- Malacca FA
- (Johor) Melodi Jaya S.C.
- (Penang) PBAPP F.C.
- Penang FA
- (Pahang) Shahzan Muda S.C.
- (Penang) SDM Navy Kepala Batas F.C.
- (Kuala Lumpur) KL SPA FC
- Tentera Darat F.A.
- (Selangor) UiTM FC

== Season changes ==
The following teams have changed division since the 2011 season.

=== To Malaysia FAM League ===
Relegated from 2011 Malaysia Premier League

- Penang FA
- (Penang) SDM Navy Kepala Batas F.C.

New Team

- (Penang) PBAPP F.C.

=== From Malaysia FAM League ===
Promoted to 2012 Malaysia Premier League

- Negeri Sembilan Betaria FC
- (Johor) MBJB FC

Teams withdrawn

- (Kuala Lumpur) Rapid KL FC
- TUDM Hornet FC
- Kor RAMD FC

=== Venues ===
Team	Location	Stadium	Stadium capacity^{1}
Malacca FA	Malacca	Hang Tuah Stadium	10,000
Melodi Jaya SC	Johor	Kulai Mini Stadium, Kulai	3,000
Penang Water Supply Board	Penang	Bandaraya Stadium	20,000
Penang FA	Penang	Batu Kawan Stadium	30,000
KP Shahzan Muda FC	Pahang	Temerloh Mini Stadium	13,000
Kepala Batas FC	Penang	Batu Kawan Stadium	30,000
KL SPA FC	Selangor	Petronas Mini Stadium, Bangi	3,000
Tentera Darat FC	Kuala Lumpur	Football Field Camp Batu Kentomen	500
UiTM FC	Selangor	UiTM Stadium, Shah Alam	10,000

==== Personnel and kits ====
Note: Flags indicate national team as has been defined under FIFA eligibility rules. Players and Managers may hold more than one non-FIFA nationality.

Team	Coach	Captain	Kit manufacturer	Shirt sponsor
Malacca FA	G. Selvamohan	Amrie Abdullah	Ambros	Metaforce
Melodi Jaya SC	Edres Selamat	Mohd Fairuz Abdul Rahman	Nike	PJM
Penang Water Supply Board	Zabidi Hassan	Mat Saiful Mohamad	Line7	PBAPP
Penang FA	Jánós Krécská	Hasmawi Hassan	Adidas	Allianz University College of Medical Science
KP Shahzan Muda FC	Tajuddin Nor	Raja Mohd Hafillah Raja Mamat	Kappa	
Kepala Batas FC	Halim	Safuan Azwan Abdul Shukor	Lancast	
KL SPA FC	Mohd Nizam Jamil	Sazali Suwandi	Joma	Suruhanjaya Perkidmatan Awam
Tentera Darat F.A.	Abdul Kamal	Josep Amar	adidas	Honda
UiTM FC	Azman Eusoff	Ahmad Shahir Ismail	Umbro	UiTM

== League table ==
Pos	Team	Pld	W	D	L	GF	GA	GD	Pts	Promotion
1	KL SPA FC (C, P)	16	12	2	2	28	9	+19	38	Promotion to 2013 Malaysia Premier League
2	Shahzan Muda FC	16	11	1	4	30	15	+15	34	Promotion to 2013 Malaysia FAM League Play-off round
3	UiTM FC	16	10	4	2	22	9	+13	34	Promotion to 2013 Malaysia Premier League
4	PBAPP FC	16	8	3	5	27	14	+13	27	
5	Tentera Darat F.A.	16	6	4	6	27	17	+10	22	
6	Penang FA	16	6	0	10	20	24	−4	18	
7	Malacca FA	16	5	1	10	20	25	−5	16	
8	Melodi Jaya S.C.	16	3	3	10	12	34	−22	12	Withdrew from FAM League and dissolved.
9	SDM Navy Kepala Batas FC	16	1	2	13	11	50	−39	5	Withdrew from FAM League and dissolved.

Updated to match(es) played on 1 July 2012. Source: Malaysia Football Dimos
Rules for classification: 1) points; 2) goal difference; 3) number of goals scored.
(C) Champions; (P) Promoted

=== Fixtures and results ===
Fixtures and Results of the Malaysia FAM League 2012 season.

=== Week 1 ===
4 March	Malacca FA	0–1	Penang FA	Malacca
16:45 UTC+08:00			Hasmawi Hassan 52'	Stadium: Hang Tuah Stadium

4 March	SDMS Kepala Batas FC	0–1	SPA FC	Batu Kawan, Penang
16:45 UTC+08:00			Asnawi Razak 62' (o.g.)	Stadium: Batu Kawan Stadium

4 March	UiTM FC	4–1	Melodi Jaya Sports Club	Shah Alam, Selangor
16:45 UTC+08:00	Khairul Naim Mahyuddin 32' 49' Hidayat 72' 90+'		Hakim Zainol 50' (o.g.)	Stadium: UiTM Stadium

4 March	Shahzan Muda FC	1–4	Tentera Darat FC	Temerloh, Pahang
20:45 UTC+08:00	Hantu 23' (o.g.)		Hantu 44' , 46' 77' , 90+'	Stadium: Temerloh Mini Stadium

=== Week 2 ===
14 March	Penang FA	1–3	Shahzan Muda FC	Batu Kawan, Penang
16:45 UTC+08:00				Stadium: Batu Kawan Stadium

14 March	Melodi Jaya Sports Club	2–2	SDMS Kepala Batas FC	Kulai, Johor
16:45 UTC+08:00				Stadium: Mini Kulai Stadium

14 March	Tentera Darat FC	1–1	PBAPP FC	Kuala Lumpur
16:45 UTC+08:00				Stadium: Football Field Camp Batu Kentomen

14 March	SPA FC	5–0	Malacca FA	Bangi
16:45 UTC+08:00				Stadium: Mini Petronas Stadium

=== Week 3 ===
18 March	PBAPP FC	2–1	Penang FA	Penang
16:45 UTC+08:00				Stadium: Bandaraya Stadium

18 March	UiTM FC	1–1	Tentera Darat FC	Shah Alam
16:45 UTC+08:00				Stadium: UiTM Stadium

18 March	Melodi Jaya Sports Club	1–3	SPA FC	Kulai, Johor
16:45 UTC+08:00				Stadium: Mini Kulai Stadium

18 March	Shahzan Muda FC	3–0	Malacca FA	Temerloh, Pahang
20:45 UTC+08:00				Stadium: Temerloh Mini Stadium

=== Week 4 ===
25 March	Penang FA	1–2	UiTM FC	Batu Kawan, Penang
16:45 UTC+08:00	Manchester United FC 25'		Terengganu FA 55'; Kelantan FA 90+'	Stadium: Batu Kawan Stadium

25 March	Malacca FA	1–2	PBAPP FC	Malacca
16:45 UTC+08:00	Didier Drogba		John Terry; Jainin Tinin	Stadium: Hang Tuah Stadium

25 March	Tentera Darat FC	6–0	SDMS Kepala Batas FC	Kuala Lumpur
16:45 UTC+08:00				Stadium: Football Field Camp Batu Kentomen

=== Week 5 ===
1 April	PBAPP FC	v	Shahzan Muda FC	Penang
16:45 UTC+08:00				Stadium: Bandaraya Stadium

1 April	UiTM FC	v	Malacca FA	Shah Alam
16:45 UTC+08:00				Stadium: UiTM Stadium

1 April	SDMS Kepala Batas FC	v	Penang FA	Batu Kawan, Penang
16:45 UTC+08:00				Stadium: Batu Kawan Stadium

1 April	Melodi Jaya Sports Club	v	Tentera Darat FC	Kulai, Johor
16:45 UTC+08:00				Stadium: Mini Kulai Stadium,

4 April	SPA FC	3–1	Shahzan Muda FC	Bangi, Selangor
16:45 UTC+08:00				Stadium: Mini Petronas Stadium,

=== Week 6 ===
8 April	Penang FA	v	Melodi Jaya Sports Club	Penang
16:45 UTC+08:00				Stadium: Batu Kawan Stadium,

8 April	Malacca FA	v	SDMS Kepala Batas FC	Melaka
16:45 UTC+08:00				Stadium: Hang Tuah Stadium,

8 April	Shahzan Muda FC	v	UiTM FC	Temerloh, Pahang
20:45 UTC+08:00				Stadium: Temerloh Stadium,

8 April	SPA FC	2–1	PBAPP FC	Bangi, Selangor
16:45 UTC+08:00				Stadium: Mini Petronas Stadium,

=== Week 7 ===
15 April	Melodi Jaya Sports Club	0–2	Malacca	Kulai Stadium, Kulai
16:45 UTC+08:00

15 April	Kepala Batas	0–5	Shahzan Muda	Temerloh, Pahang
20:45 UTC+08:00				Stadium: Temerloh Stadium,

15 April	Malaysia Institute Technology University	0–0	Penang Water Supply Corporation	UiTM Stadium, Shah Alam, Selangor
16:45 UTC+08:00

15 April	Tentera Darat	0–0	Public Services Commission	Petronas Stadium, Bangi, Selangor
16:45 UTC+08:00

=== Week 9 ===
22 April	Penang Water Supply Corporation	5–0	Melodi Jaya	City Stadium, Penang
16:45 UTC+08:00

=== Week 10 ===
29 April	Public Services Commission	1–0	Penang FA	Batu Kawan Stadium, Penang
16:45 UTC+08:00

29 April	Penang Water Supply Corporation	2–2	Melodi Jaya	City Stadium, Penang
16:45 UTC+08:00

29 April	Mara Institute of Technology University	1–0	Kepala Batas	UiTM Stadium, Shah Alam
16:45 UTC+08:00

== Round table ==
Home \ Away	MLC	MJSC	PBAPP	PEN	SMFC	SDMS	SPA	TDM	UIT
MLC		2–0	1–2	0–1	0–1	4–0	0–2	0–0	1–2
MJSC	0–2		0–5	1–0	0–1	2–2	1–3	2–1	0–0
PBAPP	5–0	2–2		2–1	2–0	3–1	0–1	0–1	1–0
Penang	2–1	4–0	2–0		1–3	0–3	0–1	2–1	1–2
SMFC	3–0	1–0	1–0	4–1		5–0	1–1	1–4	1–0
SDMS	0–7	1–3	1–3	1–3	0–5		0–1	0–4	1–1
Putrajaya SPA	5–0	3–0	2–1	1–0	4–4	2–1		2–0	1–3
TDM	0–2	3–0	1–1	3–2	1–2	6–0	0–0		1–2
UiTM	2–0	4–1	0–0	1–0	2–0	1–0	1–0	1–1	

Updated to match(es) played on 1 July 2012. Source: Malaysia FAM League
Legend: Blue = home team win; Yellow = draw; Red = away team win.

== Play-offs ==
=== Premier League/FAM League ===
The play-off matches to determine promotion and relegation will be held at Hang Tuah Stadium and Hang Jebat Stadium, Malacca on 17 July 2012. Team that finished 7th in the Premier League, Pos Malaysia FC will meet second placed team in FAM League, Shahzan Muda FC, while team that finished 9th in the Premier League, Muar Municipal Council FC will meet team that finished 10th in the Premier League, Betaria FC. The winner of both matches will stay in the 2013 Malaysia Premier League; the losing teams will be relegated to 2013 Malaysia FAM League.

Pos Malaysia FC and Muar Municipal Council FC won their respective matches and thus stay in Premier League next season. Losing teams are Shahzan Muda FC and Betaria FC; both will play in FAM League next season.

Match 1

17 July 2012
16:45 UTC+08:00

Shahzan Muda FC	1–5	Pos Malaysia FC
Muhd Helmi 70' (pen.)		Fakhrul Aiman 5' 41'; G. Puaneswaran 15'; Hanifuddin 17'; Hafizi Amiruddin 75' (pen.)

Hang Jebat Stadium, Malacca

Match 2

17 July 2012
16:45 UTC+08:00

Muar Municipal Council FC	3–0	Betaria FC
Echesa 33'; Efendi Malek 72'; Mohd Alafi 89'

Hang Tuah Stadium, Malacca

== Champions ==
Champions

1st title

== See also ==
- 2012 Malaysia Super League
- 2012 Malaysia Premier League
- 2012 Malaysia FA Cup
