= Muhammad Al-Hafiz =

Malaysian footballer

Al-Hafiz Hamzah
Personal information
- Full name: Muhammad Al-Hafiz Bin Hamzah
- Date of birth: 15 March 1984 (age 42)
- Place of birth: Pendang, Kedah, Malaysia
- Height: 1.70 m (5 ft 7 in)
- Position: Goalkeeper

Youth career
- 2000–2001: Bukit Jalil Sports School
- 2002–2003: Kedah

Senior career*
Years	Team	Apps	(Gls)
2004–2011	Kedah	41	(0)
2012	USM FC	22	(0)
2013–2015	Johor Darul Ta'zim	38	(0)
2016	Johor Darul Ta'zim II	9	(0)
2017	PDRM	5	(0)
2018	Penang	8	(0)

International career^{‡}
2004	Malaysia U-20	3	(0)
2005–2006	Malaysia U-23	4	(0)
2008–	Malaysia	1	(0)
- * Club domestic league appearances and goals as of 22 May 2018 ‡ National team caps and goals as of January 23, 2017

Al-Hafiz Hamzah (born 15 March 1984) is a former Malaysian professional footballer who plays as a goalkeeper.

== Club career ==
=== Kedah FA ===
He was a product of Kedah's youth system (President Cup team), and started in the junior squad during the 2002 season, but it was not until 2004 that he debuted in the senior side, replacing Megat Amir Faisal Al Khalidi Ibrahim.

In 2004, where Malaysian football was introduced with the Malaysia Super League, Al-Hafiz became a second choice goalkeeper behind Megat Amir Faisal after Mirandinha brought him into the senior squad. However, he had been given a chance and made his debut in the first league match against Selangor Public Bank FC on 14 February 2004 after Megat Amir Faisal had a serious back injury during the pre-season preparations.

=== USM FC ===
Al-Hafiz joined Premier league side, USM FC, in the 2012 season.

=== Johor Darul Takzim FC ===
Al-Hafiz joined the star-studded squad, Johor Darul Takzim F.C., in 2013, after USM FC management cited financial difficulties as the reason for the decision to pull out of the Malaysia Premier League. He got off to a mixed start for the 2013 season but managed to cement his place as a first-choice goalkeeper throughout the season.

== Honours ==
=== Club honours ===
Johor Darul Takzim

- Malaysian Charity Shield: 2015 Winner
- Malaysia Super League (2): 2014, 2015
- 2014 Malaysia Cup: Runner Up
- 2013 Malaysia FA Cup: Runner Up
