= Mohd Hafiszuan Salehuddin =

Malaysian footballer

Mohd Hafiszuan
Personal information
- Full name: Mohd Hafiszuan bin Salehuddin
- Date of birth: 21 June 1987 (age 39)
- Place of birth: Perak, Malaysia
- Height: 1.75 m (5 ft 9 in)
- Positions: Midfielder; defender

Team information
- Current team: Terengganu City

Youth career
- 2006–2008: Perak FA President Cup's Team

Senior career*
Years	Team	Apps	(Gls)
2008–2010	Perak FA	18	(2)
2011	Perlis FA	21	(2)
2011	→ Perak FA (loan)	4	(0)
2012	Felda United FC	11	(1)
2013–2014	KL SPA FC	26	(1)
2015	Sime Darby F.C.	0	(0)
2016	AirAsia Football Club	0	(0)
2017	Perlis FA	6	(0)
2018–	Terengganu City	9	(2)
- * Club domestic league appearances and goals as of 25 July 2017

Mohd Hafiszuan Salehuddin (born 21 June 1987) is a Malaysian footballer who is currently playing for Terengganu City in the Malaysia FAM League. His playing position is as a midfielder, but can also operate as a defender.

== Career ==
Hafiszuan started his professional career in Perak FA youth squad. Starting from the 2009 season, he was one of several Perak youth players promoted to main squad after the exodus of Perak players to other teams. He signed to play for Perlis in early 2011, but returned to Perak on loan in August 2011 for Perak's Malaysia Cup campaign.

He was not retained in the Perlis squad for the 2012 Malaysia Premier League campaign. In April 2012 he joint Felda United FC. In Second Transfer window 2013 he signed to KL SPA FC.

On 29 November 2016, he signed with Perlis FA.
