= Hasmarul Fadzir =

Malaysian footballer

Personal information
- Full name: Mohamad Hasmarul Fadzir bin Hassan
- Date of birth: 4 November 1986 (age 40)
- Place of birth: Selangor, Malaysia
- Height: 1.88 m (6 ft 2 in)
- Positions: Defensive midfielder; centre back

Team information
- Current team: Selangor United
- Number: 2

Youth career
- 2004–2005: Selangor U19

Senior career*
Years	Team	Apps	(Gls)
2006–2007	PKNS FC		
2008	PLUS FC		
2009–2011	Felda United		
2012	Selangor FA		
2013	Sime Darby		
2015–2016	AirAsia FC		
2017–	Selangor United		
- * Club domestic league appearances and goals as of March 7, 2018

Hasmarul Fadzir (born 4 November 1986 in Selangor) is a Malaysian footballer who plays as defensive midfielder for Selangor United. He played for Sime Darby in the Malaysia Premier League in 2013 season. He can also play as a central defender. In 2015, he join AirAsia FC in the Malaysia FAM League.
