= SPA F.C. =

Malaysian football club

SPA
- Full name: Suruhanjaya Perkhidmatan Awam Football Club
- Nickname: The Wild Cats
- Founded: 22 January 2005; 21 years ago
- Dissolved: 2015
- Ground: Petaling Jaya Stadium
- Capacity: 10,000
- Owner: Suruhanjaya Perkhidmatan Awam Malaysia
- 2015: Malaysia Premier League, 12th
- Website: www.spa.gov.my
Home colours	Away colours

Suruhanjaya Perkhidmatan Awam Football Club (English: Public Services Commission Football Club), commonly known as SPA FC, was a football club from Kuala Lumpur, Federal Territory of Malaysia. The team formerly played in the Premier League, the second tier of Malaysian football league. In 2015, the club has pulled from the league for financial reasons.

== History ==
Suruhanjaya Perkhidmatan Awam Football Club or SPA FC was founded as a recreational club for the staff of the Malaysian Public Services Commission (Malay:Suruhanjaya Perkhidmatan Awam Malaysia). The club, affiliated with Kuala Lumpur FA, started by competing in the KLFA Second Division League in 2005. Promoted to the KLFA First Division in 2007, they continued ascent in the Kuala Lumpur football pyramid when they were promoted to KLFA Premier League in 2009.

They joined the nationwide amateur league Malaysia FAM League in 2010. first season saw them finish at respectable third place, pipped by SDMS Kepala Batas for the second automatic promotion spot to 2011 Malaysia Premier League by virtue of goal difference. However, their second season was not as good, finishing in eighth place out of 11 teams.

In the FA Cup they advanced to the quarter-finals, the furthest a Malaysia FAM League side has progressed since 1994. SPA progressed by beating Malaysia Premier League side MBJB FC and invited Cambodian club Preah Khan Reach F.C., before being stopped by Malaysia Super League defending champion Kelantan FA 5–0 on aggregate. In the league, SPA went all the way to become the league champion, clinching the title and promotion to 2013 Malaysia Premier League with a match to spare.

== Honours ==
- Division 3/FAM League

(gold) Winners (1) : 2012

(bronze) Third place (1): 2010

== Coaches ==
Year	Coach
2011–2013	(Malaysia) Mohd Nizam Jamil
Year	Coach
2013 – May 2015	(Malaysia) Mohd Shah Alias Mohd Norbit
Year	Coach
May–November 2015	(Australia) Ken Worden
