= Zainal Rabin =

Malaysian footballer

Personal information
- Full name: Abdul Zainal Rabin
- Date of birth: 23 February 1975 (age 51)
- Place of birth: Malacca, Malaysia
- Position: Goalkeeper

Team information
- Current team: MP Muar FC
- Number: 1

Senior career*
Years	Team	Apps	(Gls)
1998–2003	Malacca FA		
2004–07	Melaka TMFC		
2007–08	Perlis FA		
2009–11	Felda United FC		
2012	MP Muar FC		
- * Club domestic league appearances and goals

Zainal Rabin (born 23 February 1975) is a Malaysian footballer who played as goalkeeper.

A Malaccan born goalkeeper, has been rated as a good shot stopper but never been called up for national duty since he made his debut for his state country back in 1999. A transfer to club side Melaka TMFC made Zainal a well known goalkeeper across the nation and he spent 5 seasons with TMFC as a regular choice among 3 coaches.

He signed for Perlis FA in mid-season of 2007/08. In 2009, he transferred to Felda United FC.

He moved to MP Muar FC in 2012 to replace Sani Anuar Kamsani who has moved to Sarawak FA.
