= Muhamad Zamri Chin =

Malaysian footballer

Muhamad Zamri
Personal information
- Full name: Muhamad Zamri Bin Chin
- Date of birth: 22 May 1985 (age 41)
- Place of birth: Pendang, Kedah, Malaysia
- Position: Striker

Team information
- Current team: ZAM FC

Senior career*
Years	Team	Apps	(Gls)
2006–2007	Kuala Muda NAZA FC	18	(6)
2007–2009	UPB-MyTeam FC	20	(5)
2010	Kedah FA	18	(3)
2011	Felda United	9	(1)
2012	Johor Darul Takzim	24	(9)
2013	Sime Darby F.C.	11	(3)
2014	Penang FA	18	(1)
- * Club domestic league appearances and goals as of 9 December 2013

Muhamad Zamri Bin Chin (born 22 May 1985) is a Malaysian footballer who is a striker.
