= Mohd Saiful Rusly =

Malaysian footballer

Mohd Saiful
Personal information
- Full name: Mohd Saiful Rusly
- Date of birth: 3 February 1978 (age 48)
- Place of birth: Kuala Lumpur, Malaysia
- Position: Defender

Team information
- Current team: PDRM FA

Senior career*
Years	Team	Apps	(Gls)
2001–2005	PDRM FA	?	(3)
2005–2006	Perak UPB	?	(2)
2006–2007	PDRM FA	?	(0)
2007–2009	Terengganu FA	?	(0)
2010–	PDRM FA	?	(?)
- * Club domestic league appearances and goals

Mohd Saiful Rusly (born 2 February 1978) is a Malaysian football player who played for PDRM FA in the Malaysia Premier League in the 2010 season. He rejoined that club after he was released in November 2009 by Malaysia Super League team Terengganu FA where he had been a first-team regular.
