= Megat Amir Faisal =

Malaysian footballer and coach

Personal information
- Full name: Megat Amir Faisal Al Khalidi bin Ibrahim
- Date of birth: 27 September 1978 (age 48)
- Place of birth: Penang, Malaysia
- Position: Goalkeeper

Team information
- Current team: Petaling Jaya City FC (goalkeeping coach)

Youth career
- 1991–1996: Penang

Senior career*
Years	Team	Apps	(Gls)
1996–1998	Penang	45	(0)
1999	Olympic 2000	0	(0)
2000–2003	Penang	68	(0)
2004–2006	Kedah	56	(0)
2006–2008	Selangor	16	(0)
2009–2010	Perak	5	(0)
2011	Penang	11	(0)
2012–2014	PBAPP FC	35	(0)

International career
1997	Malaysia U-20		
1998–1999	Malaysia U-23		
1998	Malaysia	2	(0)

Managerial career
- 2015–2017: Malaysia U22 (goalkeeping coach)
- 2017: Felcra (goalkeeping coach)
- 2018: Kedah FA (goalkeeping coach)
- 2019: Petaling Jaya City FC (goalkeeping coach)
- * Club domestic league appearances and goals

Megat Amir Faisal Al Khalidi bin Ibrahim (born 27 September 1978) is a Malaysian footballer who is a former football player and now he is a professional coach. He has coached Harimau Muda U23 and Malaysia Team U23 to national level in 2015 and 2016. He has also coached Felcra and Kedah. He is the current First Team Goalkeeper Coach for PJ City FC. He holds AFC Goalkeeping Coaching Certificate Level 3. His preferred playing position is as a goalkeeper.

== Career ==
The Penang-born goalkeeper began his career with the Penang youth team and was later picked as one of the national Olympic 2000 team goalkeepers playing in M-League for the 1999 season. After his national team stint ended, he returned to Penang and became the understudy of the main goalkeeper Zamri Mat Ariff. After Zamri's departure to Perak, he was given a nod as the main senior team goalkeeper until he signed with Kedah in 2005. He became a cult figure with Kedah due to his performances with them.

Other clubs noticed his performances with Kedah, leading to Megat joining Selangor for a two-season contract in 2006. He was released by Selangor with a few other senior players in a clean-out following a very poor season for Selangor in 2008.

He had a trial with Perak FA and later signed with them after Perak FA lost two of their experienced goalkeepers, Mohd Hamsani Ahmad and Mohd Nasril Nourdin to Selangor for the 2009 season. After being released from Perak, he returned to his hometown to join Penang FA for Malaysia Premier League 2011 season.

In 2012, he joined another Penang outfit PBAPP FC and plays in the 2012 Malaysia FAM League for the first time.

Megat was part of the Malaysia squad at the 1997 FIFA World Youth Championship in Malaysia. He also participated at the 2004 Malaysia Cup where his team lost 1–0.

== Honours ==
=== Penang FA ===
- Malaysia Premier 1 League: 1998, 2001
- Malaysia FA Cup: 2002
- Malaysia Charity Shield: 2003

=== Kedah FA ===
- Malaysia Premier League: 2005-06
