= Mohizam Shah Dawood Shah =

Malaysian footballer

Mohizam Shah
Personal information
- Full name: Mohizam Shah bin Dawood Shah
- Date of birth: 8 May 1985 (age 41)
- Place of birth: Malacca, Malaysia
- Position: Striker

Youth career
- 2003–2005: PKNS President's Cup

Senior career*
Years	Team	Apps	(Gls)
2006–2009	PKNS	30	(16)
2010–2011	Sime Darby FC	24	(12)
2013	FELDA United	3	(0)
2014	Malacca FC	0	(0)
- * Club domestic league appearances and goals as of 5 December 2013 ‡ National team caps and goals as of 5 December 2013

Mohizam Shah Dawood Shah (born 8 May 1985) is a Malaysian former football player. His preferred position is as a striker.

== Career ==
Mohizam Shah formerly played in PKNS FC for seven years. He transferred to Sime Darby FC, at the time a club in Malaysia FAM Cup league, in 2010. He helped the club win the competition in that season, and promoted to 2011 Malaysia Premier League. In April 2013, he joined Felda United FC.

He joined Malacca FA in 2014 for the 2014 Malaysia FAM League season.

Mohizam also have represented Universiti Putra Malaysia in their football team, that enters in the Malaysian inter-varsity league.

== National team ==
He has been called to the Malaysia national football team in early 2006, for the friendly match against club team PDRM FA and two game friendly tour to New Zealand against New Zealand national football team. He played and scored against PDRM FA, however he does not play for the 'A'-class international match against New Zealand.

He also has represented Malaysia university team in the Asean University Games 2008, held in Kuala Lumpur.
