= Tengku Mohd Adam =

Malaysian footballer

Personal information
- Birth name: Tengku Mohd Adam bin Tengku Mohd Rosly
- Date of birth: 19 August 1983 (age 43)
- Place of birth: Terengganu, Malaysia
- Positions: Midfielder; striker

Team information
- Current team: Perlis FA

Senior career*
Years	Team	Apps	(Gls)
2003–2004	Terengganu FA		(7)
2005	Pahang FA		(0)
2005–2006	Shahzan Muda FC		(5)
2006–2010	PKNS FC		(3)
2011	Perlis FA		
- * Club domestic league appearances and goals as of 13 January 2009

Tengku Mohd Adam bin Tengku Mohd Rosly (born 19 August 1983) is a Malaysian footballer who currently plays for Perlis FA. He was also part of the Malaysia U-23 squad in 2004.

He started his career by playing with Terengganu. He later joined Pahang in 2005, but had only a role as a substitute. He then transferred to Shahzan Muda FC and earned a spot in the first eleven. He later joined PKNS FC in the 2006/07 season.
