= Mohd Hasmawi Hassan =

Malaysian footballer

Hasmawi Hassan
Personal information
- Full name: Mohd. Hasmawi bin Hassan
- Date of birth: 4 August 1980 (age 46)
- Place of birth: Penang, Malaysia
- Height: 1.66 m (5 ft 5 1/2 in)
- Position: Forward

Team information
- Current team: AAK (head coach)

Senior career*
Years	Team	Apps	(Gls)
1998–2003	Penang FA		
2004–2008	Kedah FA		
2009–2010	Felda United FC		
2011	Negeri Sembilan FA		
2012–2013	Penang FA		

International career
2002	Malaysia	3	(0)

Managerial career
- MIB FC
- Cyberlynk FC
- 2023–: AAK Puncak Alam
- * Club domestic league appearances and goals

Hasmawi Hassan (born 4 August 1980) is a former Malaysian former professional footballer.

== Club career ==
Known as "Mawi" by fans, the Penang-born striker was one of top player at Penang FA since drafted to senior team in the 1998 season. While at Penang, he helps the team win Premier 1 championship in 1998 and 2001, Malaysia FA Cup in 2002 and Malaysia Charity Shield in 2003. After playing several season with his hometown team, he signed with Kedah FA in 2004 and was an instrumental figure in helping Kedah win the 'double treble' championship (League, FA Cup and Malaysia Cup) in 2007 and 2008. He was the first starter in Kedah's line-up for the majority of his career there until the emergence of Kedah youngster Mohd Khyril Muhymeen Zambri taking over his place at the end of his stay in Kedah.

For the 2009 season, he was released by Kedah FA and later signed with Premier League Malaysia outfit, Felda United FC for a season contract. He later was signed by Negeri Sembilan FA to play in the 2011 Super League Malaysia. He returned to Penang in 2012.

== International career ==
He received several call-ups with Malaysia national football team, appearing 3 times for them, one of the match was against Brazil national football team in 2002. He also represents Malaysia U-21 for the Afro-Asian Games Hyderabad, India in October 2003.

== Honours ==
=== Penang FA ===
- Malaysia Premier 1 League (2): 1998, 2001
- Malaysia FA Cup (1): 2002
- Malaysia Charity Shield (1): 2003

=== Kedah FA ===
- Malaysia Premier League (1): 2006
- Malaysia Cup (2): 2007, 2008
- Malaysia FA Cup (2): 2007, 2008
- Malaysia Super League (2): 2007, 2008

=== Felda United FC ===
- Malaysia Premier League (1): 2010

=== Negeri Sembilan FA ===
- Malaysia Cup (1): 2011
