= Rapid KL F.C. =

Malaysian football club

Rapid Kuala Lumpur
- Full name: Rapid Kuala Lumpur Football Club
- Nickname(s): The Transporters
- Founded: 2010; 15 years ago
- Owner: Rapid KL

Rapid Kuala Lumpur FC (often shortened to Rapid KL F.C.) is a Malaysian football club based in Kuala Lumpur. The club has represented the transportation company Rapid KL. The club entered the Malaysia FAM League in 2011 and got 5th place. The club also hold the biggest record of winning the match with 7–1 against Melodi Jaya Sports Club. Unfortunately, the club decided to pull out from 2012 season due to financial difficulties. The club has also participated in the KLFA Division 1 League.
