= Mohd Fadly Baharum =

Malaysian footballer (born 1988)

Fadly Baharum
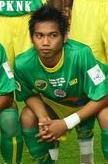
- Fadly in 2015

Personal information
- Full name: Mohd Fadly Baharum
- Date of birth: 31 August 1988 (age 38)
- Place of birth: Alor Star, Kedah, Malaysia
- Position: Left midfielder

Team information
- Current team: Kedah FA
- Number: 15

Youth career
- 2007–2008: Kedah FA President Cup

Senior career*
Years	Team	Apps	(Gls)
2008–2018	Kedah FA	299	(54)
- * Club domestic league appearances and goals

Mohd Fadly Baharum (born 31 August 1988) is a Malaysian footballer currently playing as a left midfielder for Kedah FA.

== Career ==
He progressed through the youth ranks of Kedah FA President Cup squad, Fadly was promoted to the professional football career for season 2007/08 to converted the regular left-side midfielder after a controversial migrated of Zairol Fitree Ishak to Kelantan FA. His Kedah debut got off to an impressive start, scoring 17 goals in first season, which he had scores in every competitions including the AFC Cup; and became a second top scorer for the Canaries behind the electrifying Vincentian Marlon Alex James. Fadly's made his debut for the team on 11 March 2008, at Darul Aman Stadium, against Victory SC in their AFC Cup opening match. Four days later, he scored his first goal for the team against UPB-MyTeam FC as Kedah won 2-0.

== Rookie ==
Fadly also played a major part in helping Kedah to crown as the double treble champions of Malaysian football. He scored the opening goal for Kedah after just 2-minute play time in their 3–2 win over Selangor FA in the Malaysia FA Cup 2008 final at their home ground Shah Alam Stadium, Selangor; and once again on 23 August 2008 he scored the third, which is also a winning goal in the 38th minute with the same result and rival in the 2007/08 Malaysia Cup final that has been held at Bukit Jalil National Stadium. As electrifying performance for his first senior season, Fadly became a rookie for Kedah's 2007/08 squad.

== Honours ==
Fadly had become one of the hottest properties in Malaysian football, after he was announced as the "Most Promising Player" by fan in 2007/08 100Plus-F.A.M National Football Awards besides Mohd Helmi Eliza Elias, Victor Andrag, Mohd Khyril Muhymeen Zambri, Marlon Alex James and the Canaries tactician Mohd Azraai Khor Abdullah.

=== Kedah ===
- Malaysia Super League: 2007/08
- Malaysia FA Cup: 2007/08
- Malaysia Cup: 2007/08
