= SDMS Kepala Batas F.C. =

Malaysian football club

SDM Navy Kepala Batas
- Full name: Sinar Dimaja Maisara Navy Kepala Batas Football Club
- Nickname: Skuad Maisara
- Founded: 2007; 19 years ago
- Dissolved: 2012; 14 years ago
- Ground: Penang State Stadium
- Capacity: 40,000
- Chairman: Abdul Majid Saad
- League: Malaysia FAM League
- 2012: Malaysia FAM League, 9th
| Home colours | Away colours |

Sinar Dimaja Maisara Navy Kepala Batas Football Club, also known as SDM Navy Kepala Batas FC, was a Malaysian football club which last played in the Malaysia FAM League. The club was based in Kepala Batas, Penang. In 2013, the club has pulled out of the league due to financial reasons.

== Results ==
| Year | Position | League | FA Cup | Malaysia Cup |
|---|---|---|---|---|
| 2007–08 | 3 | FAM Cup | Did not enter | Did not qualify |
| 2009 | 13th | Premier League | 1st round | |
| 2010 | 2 | FAM Cup | Did not enter | Did not enter |
| 2011 | 11th | Premier League | 1st round | Did not enter |
| 2012 | 9th | FAM League | 1st round | Did not enter |
