= NS Betaria F.C. =

Malaysian football club

NS Betaria
- Full name: Negeri Sembilan Betaria Football Club
- Nickname: The Young Deers
- Founded: 2003; 23 years ago
- Dissolved: 2014; 12 years ago
- Ground: Hang Jebat Stadium, Malacca, Malaysia
- Capacity: 40,000
- League: Malaysia Premier League
- 2013: MPL, 12th (relegated)

NS Betaria F.C., also known as Betaria, was a Malaysian professional football club based in Tampin, Negeri Sembilan. The club was established in 2003.

== History ==
They were promoted to the 2012 Malaysia Premier League after winning the 2011 Malaysia FAM League. The club won the title after defeating Melodi Jaya Sports Club on the final day. In their debut season, the club finished 10th. They lost by 3–0 to Muar Municipal Council FC in the relegation playoff match; this was delayed when MP Muar pulled out of the league. A new play-off match was set with UiTM FC, the third-placed in the 2012 Malaysia FAM League. NS Betaria remained in the Premier League as they won by 3–0. Their youth team made headlines in the 2012 Malaysia President Cup tournament, finishing as runners-up to Perak FA. Betaria finished last in the 2013 Malaysia Premier League, but the club's management decided to withdraw from the 2014 Malaysia FAM League.

== Honours ==
=== Domestic ===
- Malaysia Third Division / FAM League
  - Champions (1): 2011

=== U-21 ===
- Malaysia President Cup
  - Runners-up (1): 2012

== Affiliated clubs ==
- (Malaysia) Negeri Sembilan FA
- (Malaysia) Malacca FA
