= Melodi Jaya S.C. =

Malaysian football club

Melodi Jaya Sports Club
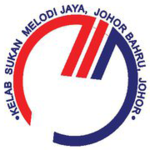
- Full name: Kelab Sukan Melodi Jaya
- Founded: 2006; 19 years ago
- Ground: Kompleks Nusa Mutiara, Johor, Malaysia
- League: Malaysia FAM Cup
- 2011: Malaysia FAM Cup, 11th

Melodi Jaya Sports Club was a football club from Johor. The team formerly played in the Malaysia FAM Cup and has pulled from the league for financial reasons.

== Coaches ==
Year	Coach
2010–2012	(Malaysia) Edres Selamat
