= 2012 Malaysia Premier League =

Liga Premier
- Season: 2012
- Champions: ATM; 1st title
- Promoted: ATM; Pahang
- Relegated: Perlis; MB Johor Bahru
- Matches: 132
- Goals: 505 (3.83 per match)
- Top goalscorer: Khairul Izuan Abdullah (23 goals, PDRM)
- Biggest home win: ATM 7-0 Perlis (18 June 2012); ATM 8-1 MP Muar (6 July 2012)
- Biggest away win: Betaria 0-7 ATM (16 April 2012)
- Highest scoring: 9 goals MP Muar 7-2 Perlis (9 January 2012); Pahang 7-2 Perlis (14 May 2012); ATM 8-1 MP Muar (6 July 2012)
- Longest winning run: 6 matches Pahang
- Longest unbeaten run: 9 matches Sime Darby
- Longest losing run: 5 matches MB Johor Bahru

The 2012 Liga Premier, also known as the Astro Liga Premier for sponsorship reasons, was the ninth season of the Liga Premier, the second-tier professional football league in Malaysia.

The season was held from 11 January and concluded on 23 July 2012.

The Liga Premier champions for 2012 season was ATM. The champions and runners-up were both promoted to 2013 Liga Super.

== Teams ==
A total of twelve teams contested the league, including eight from the 2011 Liga Premier season, two newly promoted from the 2011 Liga FAM and two relegated from the 2011 Liga Super season.

Pahang and Perlis were relegated from 2011 Liga Super after finishing the season in the bottom two places of the league table.

2011 Liga FAM champions Betaria and runner-up MB Johor Bahru secured direct promotion to this season Liga Premier.

- ATM
- (Negeri Sembilan) Betaria^{1}
- (Malaysia) Harimau Muda B^{3}
- Johor
- MB Johor Bahru^{1}
- (Johor) MP Muar
- (Pahang) Pahang^{2}
- (Perlis) Perlis^{2}
- PDRM
- (Kuala Lumpur) Pos Malaysia
- (Kuala Lumpur) Sime Darby
- (Penang) USM
Note:

^{1}Promoted from 2011 Liga FAM
^{2}Relegated from 2011 Liga Super
^{3}Harimau Muda, the national team feeder project team was replaced fully with Harimau Muda B for this season

Locations of the venue for 2012 Liga Premier teams

=== Team summaries ===
==== Stadia ====
Team	Based Location	Current Stadium Location	Stadium	Stadium capacity
ATM	Petaling Jaya, Selangor	Petaling Jaya, Selangor	Petaling Jaya Stadium	25,000
Betaria	Tampin, Negeri Sembilan	Malacca, Malacca^{1}	Mini Tampin Stadium	1,000^{+}
Harimau Muda B	Bukit Jalil, Kuala Lumpur	Bukit Jalil, Kuala Lumpur	National Stadium, Bukit Jalil	100,000
Johor^{4}	Johor Bahru, Johor	Johor Bahru, Johor	Tan Sri Dato Hj Hassan Yunos Stadium	30,000
MB Johor Bahru^{4}	Johor Bahru, Johor	Johor Bahru, Johor	Tan Sri Dato Hj Hassan Yunos Stadium	30,000
MP Muar	Muar, Johor	Muar, Johor	Sultan Ibrahim Stadium	4,000
Pahang	Kuantan, Pahang	Temerloh, Pahang^{2}	Temerloh Mini Stadium	35,000
Perlis	Kangar, Perlis	Kangar, Perlis	Utama Stadium	20,000
PDRM	Selayang, Selangor	Paroi, Negeri Sembilan^{3}	Majlis Perbandaran Selayang Stadium	25,000
Pos Malaysia	Selayang, Selangor	Selayang, Selangor	Majlis Perbandaran Selayang Stadium	25,000
Sime Darby	Selayang, Selangor	Selayang, Selangor	Majlis Perbandaran Selayang Stadium	25,000
USM	George Town, Penang	George Town, Penang	USM Athletics Stadium	800^{+}

Note:

- ^{+} estimated capacity
- ^{1} Betaria currently using Hang Tuah Stadium in Malacca, Malacca
- ^{2} Pahang currently using Temerloh Mini Stadium in Temerloh, Pahang
- ^{3} PDRM currently using Tuanku Abdul Rahman Stadium in Paroi, Negeri Sembilan
- ^{4} Both Johor and MB Johor Bahru used Pasir Gudang Corporation Stadium in Pasir Gudang and Sultan Ibrahim Stadium in Muar respectively from January until the end of March 2012.

==== Personnel and kits ====
Note: Flags indicate national team as has been defined under FIFA eligibility rules. Players and Managers may hold more than one non-FIFA nationality.

Team	Manager	Coach	Captain	Kit manufacturer	Shirt sponsor
ATM	(Malaysia) B. Sathianathan	(Malaysia) B. Sathianathan	(Malaysia) Hairuddin Omar	Umbro	ATM
Betaria	(Malaysia) S. Sivashanmugam	(Malaysia) Azuan Zain	(Malaysia)	Kappa	
Harimau Muda B	(Malaysia) Datuk Astaman Abdul Aziz	(Malaysia) Ismail Ibrahim	(Malaysia) Muhammad Akram Mahinan	Nike	
Johor	(Singapore) Fandi Ahmad	(Malaysia) K. Sukumaran	(Malaysia) Nazrulerwan Makmor	Lotto	Kulim (M) Berhad
MB Johor Bahru	(Malaysia) Wan Azmi Wan Ahmad	(Malaysia) Mohamed Khairudin Abdul Rahman	(Bosnia and Herzegovina) Dalibor Dragic		
MP Muar	(Malaysia) Mohd Nazrun Mahmud	(Malaysia) Abdul Nasir Yusof	(Malaysia)	Kronos	Interpacific
Pahang	(Malaysia) Che Nasir Salleh	(Malaysia) Dollah Salleh	(Malaysia) Jalaluddin Jaafar	Lotto	Pahang
Perlis	(Malaysia) Azahar Ahmad	(Malaysia) Robert Scully	(Malaysia)	Kubba	kubbaonline.com
PDRM	(Malaysia) Zulkifli Mohamad	(Malaysia) R. Nallathamby	(Malaysia) Mohd Afif Amiruddin	Line7	Al Jabbar
Pos Malaysia	(Malaysia) Shaari Shazali	(Malaysia) G. Torairaju	(Malaysia) Azmeer Yusof	Joma	Pos Malaysia
Sime Darby	(Malaysia) Tengku Datuk Seri Ahmad Shah	(Malaysia) Ismail Zakaria	(Malaysia) Mohd Nor Ismail	Kappa	Sime Darby
USM	(Malaysia) Mohd Azizuddin Mohd Shariff	(Malaysia) S. Veloo	(Malaysia) Shariman Che Omar	Joma	

Nike has produced a new match ball, named the T90 Tracer, which will be electric blue, black and white and also a high-visibility version in yellow. Additionally, Lotto will provide officials with new kits in black, yellow, and red for the season.

=== Coaching changes ===
Club	Outgoing Head Coach	Date of vacancy	Manner of departure	Incoming Head Coach	Date of appointment
Perlis	(Malaysia) Abdullah Hassan	31 May 2012	Resigned	(Malaysia) Robert Scully	5 June 2012

== League table ==
Pos	Team	Pld	W	D	L	GF	GA	GD	Pts	Promotion or relegation
1	ATM (C, P)	22	17	3	2	73	20	+53	54	Promotion to 2013 Liga Super
2	Pahang (O, P)	22	14	4	4	60	29	+31	46	Promotion to 2013 Liga Super/Liga Premier Play-off round
3	Sime Darby	22	14	3	5	54	19	+35	45	
4	Johor	22	12	5	5	47	23	+24	41	
5	PDRM	22	11	5	6	50	38	+12	38	
6	USM	22	11	3	8	41	35	+6	36	
7	Pos Malaysia (O)	22	8	6	8	32	31	+1	30	2013 Liga Premier/Liga FAM Play-off round
8	Harimau Muda B (Note: Harimau Muda B will not be relegated, thus if they finish anywhere within relegation zone, the 7th place team will be demoted to 2013 Liga Premier/Liga FAM Play-off round. They also cannot be promoted to 2013 Liga Super.)	22	7	3	12	33	37	−4	24	
9	MP Muar	22	6	3	13	36	67	−31	21	2013 Liga Premier/Liga FAM Play-off round
10	Betaria (O)	22	6	2	14	23	59	−36	20	2013 Liga Premier/Liga FAM Play-off round
11	Perlis (R)	22	4	3	15	38	68	−30	15	Relegation to 2013 Liga FAM
12	MB Johor Bahru (R)	22	1	2	19	18	79	−61	5	Relegation to 2013 Liga FAM

Updated to match(es) played on 13 July 2012. Source: Liga Premier
Rules for classification: 1) points; 2) goal difference; 3) number of goals scored.
(C) Champions; (O) Play-off winners; (P) Promoted; (R) Relegated

== Results ==
Fixtures and Results of the 2012 Liga Premier season.

=== Week 1 ===
Monday 9 January	Sime Darby (Kuala Lumpur)	2 – 1	(Malaysia) Harimau Muda B	Majlis Perbandaran Selayang Stadium, Selayang, Selangor
16:45 UTC+08:00	Rosli Muda 29'; Zamri Hassan 65'		Ridzuan Abdunloh 89'	Attendance: 800

Monday 9 January	Pahang	1 – 0	MB Johor Bahru	Temerloh Mini Stadium, Temerloh, Pahang
20:45 UTC+08:00	Hafiz Kamal 86'			Attendance: 1,000

Monday 9 January	ATM	2 – 0	(Negeri Sembilan) Betaria	MBPJ Stadium, Petaling Jaya, Selangor
20:45 UTC+08:00	Marlon Alex James 2' 25'			Attendance: 2,200

Monday 9 January	Johor	1 – 1	PDRM	Pasir Gudang Corporation Stadium, Pasir Gudang, Johor
20:45 UTC+08:00	Esseh 54'		Norzie Ibrahim 1'	Attendance: 1,200

Monday 9 January	USM (Penang)	2 – 1	(Kuala Lumpur) Pos Malaysia	USM Athletics Stadium, Penang
20:45 UTC+08:00	Afzan 20'; Elias Sulaiman 54'		Sani nawi 42'	Attendance: 500

Monday 9 January	MP Muar (Johor)	7 – 2	Perlis	Sultan Ibrahim Stadium, Muar, Johor
16:45 UTC+08:00	Khairul Anwar 9' 8'; Alafi Mahmud 24' 52' 56' 72'; Azuwad Arip 80'		Rizal Ghazali 58' 69'	Attendance: 900

=== Week 2 ===
Friday 13 January	Pos Malaysia (Kuala Lumpur)	4 – 0	(Johor) MP Muar	Petaling Jaya Stadium, Petaling Jaya, Selangor
16:45 UTC+08:00	S. Sumindran 7'; G. Puaneswaran 52' 83'; Fakhrul Aiman 85'			Attendance: 230

Friday 13 January	Betaria (Negeri Sembilan)	1 – 1	Johor	Hang Tuah Stadium, Malacca
16:45 UTC+08:00	Fauzi Abd Kadar 59'		Fauzzi Kassim 65'	Attendance: 300

Friday 13 January	MB Johor Bahru	0 – 5	ATM	Sultan Ibrahim Stadium, Muar, Johor
16:45 UTC+08:00			Mohd Zaquan Adha 49'; Marlon Alex James 62' 71' 72' 87'	Attendance: 80

Friday 13 January	Harimau Muda B (Malaysia)	0 – 4	Pahang	National Stadium, Bukit Jalil, Kuala Lumpur
20:45 UTC+08:00			Nana Yaw Agyei 57'; R. Gopichandran 60'; Mohd Azamuddin Md Akil 77'; Abdul Malik Mat Arif 90'	Attendance: 200

Friday 13 January	PDRM	2 – 0	(Penang) USM	Tuanku Abdul Rahman Stadium, Paroi, Negeri Sembilan
20:45 UTC+08:00	Khairul Izuan 9'; Fauzi Abd Majid 75'			Attendance: 118

Friday 13 January	Perlis	1 – 2	(Kuala Lumpur) Sime Darby	Utama Stadium, Kangar, Perlis
20:45 UTC+08:00	Lamin Conteh 55'		Patrick Wleh 5'; Irme Mat 40'	Attendance: 1,000

=== Week 3 ===
Monday 16 January	MP Muar (Johor)	0 – 3	PDRM	Sultan Ibrahim Stadium, Muar, Johor
16:45 UTC+08:00			Amri Fazal 55'; Fauzi Abd Majid 69' 85'	Attendance: 200

Monday 16 January	Pos Malaysia (Kuala Lumpur)	3 – 3	Perlis	Majlis Perbandaran Selayang Stadium, Selayang, Selangor
16:45 UTC+08:00	Nahhrul Hayat 27'; Hanifuddin Abd Rahman 56'; K. Premanathan 90+3'		L.Phul Sakh 22' 75'; Lamin Conteh 90'	Attendance: 210

Monday 16 January	Pahang	2 – 1	(Kuala Lumpur) Sime Darby	Temerloh Mini Stadium, Temerloh, Pahang
20:45 UTC+08:00	Saiful Miswan 31'; R. Gopichandran 66'		Zamri Hassan 10'

Monday 16 January	ATM	2 – 0	(Malaysia) Harimau Muda B	MBPJ Stadium, Petaling Jaya, Selangor
20:45 UTC+08:00	Hairuddin Omar 71'; Christie Jayaseelan 80'

Monday 16 January	Johor	5 – 0	MB Johor Bahru	Pasir Gudang Corporation Stadium, Pasir Gudang, Johor
20:45 UTC+08:00	Fauzzi Kassim 42' 45' 76'; Fazly Mazlan 57'; Syamim Yahya 58'

Monday 16 January	USM (Penang)	2 – 1	(Negeri Sembilan) Betaria	USM Athletics Stadium, Penang
20:45 UTC+08:00	Afzan Zainal 70' 77'		Fauzi Abd Kadar 58'	Attendance: 200

=== Week 4 ===
Friday 20 January	Betaria (Negeri Sembilan)	1 – 2	(Johor) MP Muar	Hang Tuah Stadium, Malacca
16:45 UTC+08:00	Fauzi Abd Kadar 58'		R.Puganeswaran 10'; Hillary Echesa 72'	Attendance: 120

Friday 20 January	MB Johor Bahru	1 – 1	(Penang) USM	Sultan Ibrahim Stadium, Muar, Johor
16:45 UTC+08:00	Romdhizat Jamian 57'		S.Veenod 73'

Friday 20 January	Harimau Muda B (Malaysia)	1 – 1	Johor	National Stadium, Bukit Jalil, Kuala Lumpur
20:45 UTC+08:00	Norhamizaref Hamid 90'		Tharmini Saiban 22'

Friday 20 January	PDRM	2 – 2	(Kuala Lumpur) Pos Malaysia	Tuanku Abdul Rahman Stadium, Paroi, Negeri Sembilan
20:45 UTC+08:00	Norzia Ibrahim 86'; Khairul Izuan 88'		Hafizi Aminuddin 50'; G. Puneswaran 54'	Attendance: 530

Friday 20 January	Perlis	2 – 2	Pahang	Utama Stadium, Kangar, Perlis
20:45 UTC+08:00	Lamin Conteh 90' 90+3'		Hafiz Kamal 17'; Mohd Hazuan 46'

Saturday 21 January	Sime Darby (Kuala Lumpur)	2 – 1	ATM	Majlis Perbandaran Selayang Stadium, Selayang, Selangor
16:45 UTC+08:00	Sengbah Kennedy 24'; Patrick Wleh 40'		Hairuddin Omar 9'	Attendance: 2,000

Note:
- The Sime Darby - ATM match was originally set to be played on the Friday 20th but was postponed due to heavy rain when ATM were leading 2:0. The game was replayed the next day which Sime Darby went on to win 2:1

=== Week 5 ===
Friday 27 January	MP Muar (Johor)	5 – 2	MB Johor Bahru	Sultan Ibrahim Stadium, Muar, Johor
16:45 UTC+08:00	Alafi Mahmud 51' 71'; Syaiful Sabtu 76'; Azuwad Mohd Arip 90'; Abdul Rayjal 90+1'		Azmi Sarmin 9' 90+2'	Attendance: 600

Friday 27 January	Pos Malaysia (Kuala Lumpur)	2 – 3	(Negeri Sembilan) Betaria	Majlis Perbandaran Selayang Stadium, Selayang, Selangor
16:45 UTC+08:00	Armanzairi Johan 40'; G.Puneswaran 82'		Mohd Saufi Ibrahim 22'; Fauzi Abd Kadar 45'; M.Ravinthiran 65'

Friday 27 January	Johor	2 – 1	(Kuala Lumpur) Sime Darby	Pasir Gudang Corporation Stadium, Pasir Gudang, Johor
20:45 UTC+08:00	Fahruzzahar Ali 13'; Mohd Hamzani Omar 54'		Sengbah Kennedy 5'

Friday 27 January	USM (Penang)	3 – 1	(Malaysia) Harimau Muda B	USM Athletics Stadium, Penang
20:45 UTC+08:00	S.Veenod 36' 60'; Faizat Ghazali 57'		Norhamizaref Hamid 7'

Friday 27 January	PDRM	4 – 2	Perlis	Tuanku Abdul Rahman Stadium, Paroi, Negeri Sembilan
20:45 UTC+08:00	Khairul Izuan Abdullah 24' 27' 55' 87'		Rizal Ghazali 3'; Khairul Ramadhan 17'	Attendance: 800

Friday 3 February	ATM	3 – 2	Pahang	MBPJ Stadium, Petaling Jaya, Selangor
20:45 UTC+08:00	Bruno Martelotto 9'; Marlon Alex James (2l); Christie Jayaseelan 85'		Saifulnizam 15'; Mohd Azamuddin Md Akil 28'	Attendance: 2000; Referee: Mohd Amir Rizwan

=== Week 6 ===
Tuesday 7 February	Pahang	2 – 0	Johor	Temerloh Mini Stadium, Temerloh, Pahang
20:45 UTC+08:00	Mohd Azamuddin Md Akil 11' 28'			Referee: Ramli Mat Dahan

Friday 10 February	Sime Darby (Kuala Lumpur)	4 – 1	(Penang) USM	Majlis Perbandaran Selayang Stadium, Selayang, Selangor
16:45 UTC+08:00	Patrick Wleh 4' 65'; Zamri Hassan 30'; Shoufiq Kusaini 90'		Edrisar Kaye 56'

Friday 10 February	Betaria (Negeri Sembilan)	1 – 1	PDRM	Hang Tuah Stadium, Malacca
16:45 UTC+08:00	Afiq Akhmal 66'		Amri Fazal 70'

Friday 10 February	MB Johor Bahru	0 – 3	(Kuala Lumpur) Pos Malaysia	Sultan Ibrahim Stadium, Muar, Johor
16:45 UTC+08:00			Hanifuddin 38'; Fakhrul Aiman 42'; Hafizi Amiruddin 75'

Friday 10 February	Harimau Muda B (Malaysia)	2 – 2	(Johor) MP Muar	National Stadium, Bukit Jalil, Kuala Lumpur
20:45 UTC+08:00	Hadin Azman 81'; Yazid Zaini 88'		Mohd Ezaidy Khadar 21'; Khairul Anwar Shaharudin 38'

Friday 10 February	Perlis	0 – 4	ATM	Utama Stadium, Kangar, Perlis
20:45 UTC+08:00			Mohd Zaquan Adha 32'; Hairuddin Omar 45' 72' 90'	Attendance: 200

=== Week 7 ===
Monday 13 February	MP Muar (Johor)	0 – 0	(Kuala Lumpur) Sime Darby	Sultan Ibrahim Stadium, Muar, Johor
16:45 UTC+08:00

Monday 13 February	Pos Malaysia (Kuala Lumpur)	2 – 1	(Malaysia) Harimau Muda B	Majlis Perbandaran Selayang Stadium, Selayang, Selangor
16:45 UTC+08:00	Hafizi Amiruddin 58'; Hanifuddin 82'		Hadim Azman 27'

Monday 13 February	Betaria (Negeri Sembilan)	2 – 1	Perlis	Hang Tuah Stadium, Malacca
16:45 UTC+08:00	Michael Chukwubunna 36'; Mohd Saufi Ibrahim 65'		Hadi Syahmi 88'	Attendance: 900

Monday 13 February	Johor	1 – 4	ATM	Pasir Gudang Corporation Stadium, Pasir Gudang, Johor
20:45 UTC+08:00	Hamzani Omar 48'		Hairudin Omar 33' 65' 74'; Bruno Martelotto 90'

Monday 13 February	USM (Penang)	0 – 1	Pahang	USM Athletics Stadium, Penang
20:45 UTC+08:00			Boris Kochkin 72'

Monday 13 February	PDRM	3 – 5	MB Johor Bahru	Tuanku Abdul Rahman Stadium, Paroi, Negeri Sembilan
20:45 UTC+08:00	Afif Amiruddin 23' 50'; Fazli Azrin 71'		Azmin Sarmin 40' 42'; Dalibor Dragic 63'; Romdhizat Jamian 80'; Fokim Fon Fondo 83'	Attendance: 2000

=== Week 8 ===
Friday 2 March	Sime Darby (Kuala Lumpur)	1 – 1	(Kuala Lumpur) Pos Malaysia	Majlis Perbandaran Selayang Stadium, Selayang, Selangor
16:45 UTC+08:00	Razali Umar Kandasamy 65'		28'

Friday 2 March	MB Johor Bahru	2 – 3	(Negeri Sembilan) Betaria	Sultan Ibrahim Stadium, Muar, Johor
16:45 UTC+08:00	Zulzairi Idzwan 56'; Zulhisyam Safian 65'		P.Haresh 6'; C.Premnath 15'; Mohd Saufi Ibrahim 75'	Attendance: 800

Friday 2 March	Pahang	5 – 1	(Johor) MP Muar	Temerloh Mini Stadium, Temerloh, Pahang
20:45 UTC+08:00	Hazuan Daud 45'; Faizol Hussain 51'; Boris Kochkin 74'; Mohd Azamuddin Md Akil 76'; Eduard Sakhnevich 90'		Alafi Mahmud 15'	Attendance: 1000

Friday 2 March	Perlis	3 – 3	Johor	Utama Stadium, Kangar, Perlis
20:45 UTC+08:00	Lamin Conteh 42' 65'; Khairul Ramadhan 57'		Munir Amran 10' 90+2'; Muriel Orlando 45+1'	Attendance: 500

Monday 5 March	ATM	4 – 0	(Penang) USM	MBPJ Stadium, Petaling Jaya, Selangor
20:45 UTC+08:00	Mohd Zaquan Adha 33'; Hairuddin Omar 38'; D. Christie Jayaseelan 63'; A.Varathan 88'

Monday 19 March	Harimau Muda B (Malaysia)	1 – 4	PDRM	National Stadium, Bukit Jalil, Kuala Lumpur
20:45 UTC+08:00	Norhamizaref 14'		Khairul Izuan 47' 57' 77'; Khairol Abd Latif 54'

=== Week 9 ===
Friday 16 March	MP Muar (Johor)	2 – 2	ATM	Sultan Ibrahim Stadium, Muar, Johor
16:45 UTC+08:00	Ezaidy Khadar 10'; Khairul Anwar Shahrudin 29'		A.Varanthan 15'; Aidil Zafuan 58'

Friday 16 March	Pos Malaysia (Kuala Lumpur)	1 – 1	Pahang	Majlis Perbandaran Selayang Stadium, Selayang, Selangor
16:45 UTC+08:00	Fakhrul Aiman 51'		Eduard Sakhnevich 90'

Friday 16 March	Betaria (Negeri Sembilan)	3 – 2	(Malaysia) Harimau Muda B	Hang Tuah Stadium, Malacca
16:45 UTC+08:00	Chukwubunna Ijezie 50' 71'; L.Rajesh 90'		Akhir Bahari 62'; Farizzuan Azhar 79'

Friday 16 March	USM (Penang)	2 – 1	Johor	USM Athletics Stadium, Penang
20:45 UTC+08:00	Khairul Anwar Idris 70' 80'		Hamzani Omar 90+4'

Friday 16 March	PDRM	1 – 1	(Kuala Lumpur) Sime Darby	Tuanku Abdul Rahman Stadium, Paroi, Negeri Sembilan
20:45 UTC+08:00	Khairul Izuan 83'		Patrick Wleh 2'

Monday 19 March	MB Johor Bahru	1 – 6	Perlis	Sultan Ibrahim Stadium, Muar, Johor
16:45 UTC+08:00	Dalibor Dragic 33'		Lamin Conteh 20'; Shafuan Adli 38'; Henry Lewis 4' 61' 64'; Khairool Anas 82'

=== Week 10 ===
Friday 30 March	Sime Darby (Kuala Lumpur)	5 – 0	(Negeri Sembilan) Betaria	Majlis Perbandaran Selayang Stadium, Selayang, Selangor
16:45 UTC+08:00	Razali Umar Kandasamy 15'; Sengbah Kennedy 65'; Mohd Irme Mat 80' 85' (pen.); Mohd Faiz Mohd Isa 90'

Friday 30 March	Harimau Muda B (Malaysia)	0 – 0	MB Johor Bahru	National Stadium, Bukit Jalil, Kuala Lumpur
20:45 UTC+08:00

Friday 30 March	Johor	4 – 1	(Johor) MP Muar	Tan Sri Dato Hj Hassan Yunos Stadium, Johor Bahru, Johor
20:45 UTC+08:00

Friday 30 March	ATM	0 – 2	(Kuala Lumpur) Pos Malaysia	MBPJ Stadium, Petaling Jaya, Selangor
20:45 UTC+08:00			G.Puaneswaran 43' (pen.); Hanifuddin 66'

Friday 30 March	Perlis	1 – 2	(Penang) USM	Utama Stadium, Kangar, Perlis
20:45 UTC+08:00	Syed Abdul Ghafar 17'		Edrisar Kaye 13'; Akmal Noor 54'

Friday 30 March	Pahang	2 – 3	PDRM	Temerloh Mini Stadium, Temerloh, Pahang
21:45 UTC+08:00	Mohd Azamuddin Md Akil 68' 80'		Khalid Hamlet 49'; Khairul Izuan 54' 84'	Attendance: 8000

=== Week 11 ===
Friday 6 April	MP Muar (Johor)	3 – 2	(Penang) USM	Sultan Ibrahim Stadium, Muar, Johor
16:45 UTC+08:00	Abd Rayjal 3'; Mohd Alafi Mahmud 46' 69'		Adam Abd Malik 20'; Edrisar Kaye 88'

Friday 6 April	Pos Malaysia (Kuala Lumpur)	0 – 3	Johor	Majlis Perbandaran Selayang Stadium, Selayang, Selangor
16:45 UTC+08:00			Muriel Orlando 60'; Tharmini Saiban 75'; Tuah Iskandar 90'

Friday 6 April	Betaria (Negeri Sembilan)	0 – 4	Pahang	Hang Tuah Stadium, Malacca
16:45 UTC+08:00			Eduard Sakhnevich 20' 85'; Mohd Azamuddin Md Akil 39'; R.Gopinathan 52'

Friday 6 April	MB Johor Bahru	0 – 3	(Kuala Lumpur) Sime Darby	Tan Sri Dato Hj Hassan Yunos Stadium, Johor Bahru, Johor
20:45 UTC+08:00			Shoufiq Kusaini 46'; Zamri Hassan 57'; Sengbah Kennedy 64'

Friday 6 April	PDRM	0 – 2	ATM	Tuanku Abdul Rahman Stadium, Paroi, Negeri Sembilan
20:45 UTC+08:00			Marlon Alex James 30'; Bruno Martelotto 68' (pen.)

Friday 6 April	Perlis	0 – 1	(Malaysia) Harimau Muda B	Utama Stadium, Kangar, Perlis
20:45 UTC+08:00			Muhd Akmal Ishak 26'

=== Week 12 ===
Friday 13 April	Sime Darby (Kuala Lumpur)	3 – 1	MB Johor Bahru	Majlis Perbandaran Selayang Stadium, Selayang, Selangor
16:45 UTC+08:00	Zamri Hassan 2'; Patrick Wleh 22' 67'

Friday 13 April	Harimau Muda B (Malaysia)	3 – 1	Perlis	UiTM Stadium, Shah Alam, Selangor
16:45 UTC+08:00	Akmal Ishak 20'; Farizzuan Azhar 67'; Yazid Zaini 80'		Henry Lewis 66'

Friday 13 April	Johor	0 – 0	(Kuala Lumpur) Pos Malaysia	Tan Sri Dato Hj Hassan Yunos Stadium, Johor Bahru, Johor
20:45 UTC+08:00

Friday 13 April	Pahang	2 – 0	(Negeri Sembilan) Betaria	Temerloh Mini Stadium, Temerloh, Pahang
20:45 UTC+08:00	Mohd Azamuddin Md Akil 48'; Hazuan Daud 77'

Friday 13 April	ATM	2 – 2	PDRM	MBPJ Stadium, Petaling Jaya, Selangor
20:45 UTC+08:00	Azrul Azman 11'; Irwan Fadzli Idrus 90+3'		Khairul Izuan Abdullah 63' 90'

Friday 13 April	USM (Penang)	4 – 2	(Johor) MP Muar	USM Athletics Stadium, Penang
20:45 UTC+08:00	Khairul Anwar; Kaye Edrisar 45' 56'; Fauzan Zainal abidin

Note:

- The venue for the match between Harimau Muda B and Perlis was changed from National Stadium, Bukit Jalil to UiTM Stadium, Shah Alam, Selangor

=== Week 13 ===
Monday 16 April	Betaria (Negeri Sembilan)	0 – 7	ATM	Hang Tuah Stadium, Malacca
16:45 UTC+08:00			Marlon Alex James 19' 56' 79'; Mohd Fitri Omar 30'; Venice Elphi 53'; Bruno Martelotto 74'; Rezal Zambery Yahya 88'

Monday 16 April	MB Johor Bahru	0 – 5	Pahang	Tan Sri Dato Hj Hassan Yunos Stadium, Johor Bahru, Johor
20:45 UTC+08:00			Fauzi Roslan 51' 57' 89'; Abdul Malik Arif 26' 47'

Monday 16 April	Harimau Muda B (Malaysia)	0 – 3	(Kuala Lumpur) Sime Darby	MBPJ Stadium, Petaling Jaya, Selangor
20:45 UTC+08:00			Patrick Wleh 46' 74'; Zamri Hassan 90'

Monday 16 April	PDRM	0 – 2	Johor	Tuanku Abdul Rahman Stadium, Paroi, Negeri Sembilan
20:45 UTC+08:00			Muriel Orlando 38' 68'

Monday 16 April	Perlis	3 – 0	(Johor) MP Muar	Utama Stadium, Kangar, Perlis
20:45 UTC+08:00	Khairool Anas; Shafuan Adli; Lamin Conteh

Monday 16 April	Pos Malaysia (Kuala Lumpur)	v	(Penang) USM	Majlis Perbandaran Selayang Stadium, Selayang, Selangor
16:45 UTC+08:00

=== Week 14 ===
Friday 4 May	Sime Darby (Kuala Lumpur)	5 – 1	Perlis	Majlis Perbandaran Selayang Stadium, Selayang, Selangor
16:45 UTC+08:00	Patrick Wleh; Faiz Isa; Fairuz Aziz; Razali Umar Kandasamy		Mahmadu Alphajor Bah

Friday 4 May	MP Muar (Johor)	2 – 0	(Kuala Lumpur) Pos Malaysia	Sultan Ibrahim Stadium, Muar, Johor
16:45 UTC+08:00	Ezaidy Khadar; Radzi Jasman

Friday 4 May	Johor	3 – 0	(Negeri Sembilan) Betaria	Tan Sri Dato Hj Hassan Yunos Stadium, Johor Bahru, Johor
20:45 UTC+08:00	Munir Amran; Murial Orlando; Syahmim Yahya

Friday 4 May	Pahang	3 – 2	(Malaysia) Harimau Muda B	Temerloh Mini Stadium, Temerloh, Pahang
20:45 UTC+08:00	Fauzi Roslan; Mohd Hazuan Mohd Daud; Maycon		Norhamizaref; Hadin Azman

Friday 4 May	ATM	7 – 1	MB Johor Bahru	MBPJ Stadium, Petaling Jaya, Selangor
20:45 UTC+08:00	Marlon Alex James; Hairuddin Omar; Fitri Omar		Azmin Sarmin

Friday 4 May	USM (Penang)	4 – 2	PDRM	USM Athletics Stadium, Penang
20:45 UTC+08:00	Jerome Katande; Edrisar Kaye; S.Venood

=== Week 15 ===
Friday 11 May	Sime Darby (Kuala Lumpur)	2 – 3	Pahang	Majlis Perbandaran Selayang Stadium, Selayang, Selangor
20:45 UTC+08:00	Patrick Wleh 68' 86'		Maycon 84', 89'; Mohd Azamuddin Md Akil 90'

Friday 11 May	Perlis	1 – 2	(Kuala Lumpur) Pos Malaysia	Utama Stadium, Kangar, Perlis
20:45 UTC+08:00	Lamin Conteh

Friday 11 May	PDRM	4 – 1	(Johor) MP Muar	Tuanku Abdul Rahman Stadium, Paroi, Negeri Sembilan
20:45 UTC+08:00

Friday 11 May	Harimau Muda B (Malaysia)	0 – 1	ATM	Shah Alam Stadium, Shah Alam, Selangor
20:45 UTC+08:00			Hairuddin Omar 76'

Friday 11 May	MB Johor Bahru	0 – 2	Johor	Tan Sri Dato Hj Hassan Yunos Stadium, Johor Bahru, Johor
20:45 UTC+08:00			Muriel Orlando

Friday 11 May	Betaria (Negeri Sembilan)	1 – 6	(Penang) USM	Hang Tuah Stadium, Malacca
20:45 UTC+08:00			Jerome Katande; Edrisar Kaye; S.Venood

=== Week 16 ===
Monday 14 May	Pahang	7 - 2	Perlis	Temerloh Mini Stadium, Temerloh, Pahang
20:45 UTC+08:00	Maycon 15', 59', 62'; Mohd Azamuddin Md Akil 19', 82'; Mohd Fauzi Rozlan 63'; Boris Kochkin 90'		Rizal Ghazali 65', 79'

Monday 14 May	ATM	2 - 1	(Kuala Lumpur) Sime Darby	MBPJ Stadium, Petaling Jaya, Selangor
20:45 UTC+08:00	Irwan Fadzli Idrus 20'; Hairuddin Omar 86'		Leandro Teofilo 75'

Monday 14 May	Johor	3 - 1	(Malaysia) Harimau Muda B	Tan Sri Dato Hj Hassan Yunos Stadium, Johor Bahru, Johor
20:45 UTC+08:00	Muriel Orlando; Tharmini Saiban

Monday 14 May	MP Muar (Johor)	1 - 2	(Negeri Sembilan) Betaria	Hang Tuah Stadium, Malacca
20:45 UTC+08:00

Monday 14 May	Pos Malaysia (Kuala Lumpur)	1 - 0	PDRM	Majlis Perbandaran Selayang Stadium, Selayang, Selangor
20:45 UTC+08:00

Friday 25 May	USM (Penang)	3 - 0	MB Johor Bahru	USM Athletics Stadium, Penang
20:45 UTC+08:00	S.Venood; Edrisar Kaye

=== Week 17 ===
Friday 15 June	Betaria (Negeri Sembilan)	0 – 4	(Kuala Lumpur) Pos Malaysia	Hang Tuah Stadium, Malacca
16:45 UTC+08:00			P. Surmindran 46'; Hanifuddin 55'; G. Puaneswaran 66', 77'

Friday 15 June	Sime Darby (Kuala Lumpur)	1 – 0	Johor	Majlis Perbandaran Selayang Stadium, Selayang, Selangor
20:45 UTC+08:00

Friday 15 June	MB Johor Bahru	0 – 2	(Johor) MP Muar	Tan Sri Dato Hj Hassan Yunos Stadium, Johor Bahru, Johor
20:45 UTC+08:00

Friday 15 June	Harimau Muda B (Malaysia)	2 – 1	(Penang) USM	Shah Alam Stadium, Shah Alam, Selangor
20:45 UTC+08:00

Friday 15 June	Pahang	3 - 3	ATM	Temerloh Mini Stadium, Temerloh, Pahang
20:45 UTC+08:00	Maycon 10', 70'; Fauzi Rozlan 32'		Christie Jayaseelan 46'; Marlon Alex James 52'; Mohd Azmi Muslim 75'

Friday 15 June	Perlis	3 – 5	PDRM	Utama Stadium, Kangar, Perlis
20:45 UTC+08:00

=== Week 18 ===
Monday 18 June	MP Muar (Johor)	1 – 5	(Malaysia) Harimau Muda B	Sultan Ibrahim Stadium, Muar, Johor
16:45 UTC+08:00	Abidul Qahhar 39'		Mohd Syawal 31'; Mohamad Syafiq 55'; Mohammad Ridzuan 64'; Mohd Norhamizaref 66'; Mohamad Yazid 88'

Monday 18 June	Pos Malaysia (Kuala Lumpur)	3 - 2	MB Johor Bahru	Majlis Perbandaran Selayang Stadium, Selayang, Selangor
20:45 UTC+08:00

Monday 18 June	ATM	7 - 0	Perlis	MBPJ Stadium, Petaling Jaya, Selangor
20:45 UTC+08:00	Marlon Alex James 8' 32' 37' 43'; Mohd Aidil Zafuan Abdul Radzak 24' 47'; Hairuddin Omar 74'

Monday 18 June	Johor	2 - 0	Pahang	Tan Sri Dato Hj Hassan Yunos Stadium, Johor Bahru, Johor
20:45 UTC+08:00	Muriel Orlando 22' 86'

Monday 18 June	USM (Penang)	2 - 0	(Kuala Lumpur) Sime Darby	USM Athletics Stadium, Penang
20:45 UTC+08:00

Monday 18 June	PDRM	3 – 1	(Negeri Sembilan) Betaria	Tuanku Abdul Rahman Stadium, Paroi, Negeri Sembilan
20:45 UTC+08:00	Khairul Izuan Abdullah 10' 41' 60'		Nasrullah Haniff 23'

=== Week 19 ===
Friday 22 June	MB Johor Bahru	2 - 5	PDRM	Tan Sri Dato Hj Hassan Yunos Stadium, Johor Bahru, Johor
20:45 UTC+08:00

Friday 22 June	Sime Darby (Kuala Lumpur)	6 - 0	(Johor) MP Muar	Majlis Perbandaran Selayang Stadium, Selayang, Selangor
20:45 UTC+08:00	Mohd Zamri Hassan 2'; Patrick Wleh 25', 28'; Leandro Teofilo 39'; Mohd Faiz Mohd Isa 54'; Mohd Irme Mat 60'

Friday 22 June	Harimau Muda B (Malaysia)	1 - 0	(Kuala Lumpur) Pos Malaysia	Shah Alam Stadium, Shah Alam, Selangor
20:45 UTC+08:00

Friday 22 June	Pahang	1 -1	(Penang) USM	Temerloh Mini Stadium, Temerloh, Pahang
20:45 UTC+08:00	Boris Kochkin 13'		Mohd Shaiful Azrin 20'

Friday 22 June	ATM	3 - 2	Johor	MBPJ Stadium, Petaling Jaya, Selangor
20:45 UTC+08:00	Marlon Alex James 20'; Irwan Fadzli Idrus 45+2'; D. Christie Jayaseelan 63'		Mohd Yusri Abas 21'; Munir Amran 42'

Friday 22 June	Perlis	1 - 0	(Negeri Sembilan) Betaria	Utama Stadium, Kangar, Perlis
20:45 UTC+08:00	Rozaidi Abdul Rahim

=== Week 20 ===
Monday 2 July	MP Muar (Johor)	1 - 5	Pahang	Sultan Ibrahim Stadium, Muar, Johor
16:45 UTC+08:00

Monday 2 July	Betaria (Negeri Sembilan)	4 - 1	MB Johor Bahru	Hang Tuah Stadium, Malacca
16:45 UTC+08:00

Monday 2 July	Johor	4 - 0	Perlis	Tan Sri Dato Hj Hassan Yunos Stadium, Johor Bahru, Johor
20:45 UTC+08:00

Monday 2 July	Pos Malaysia (Kuala Lumpur)	0 - 4	(Kuala Lumpur) Sime Darby	Majlis Perbandaran Selayang Stadium, Selayang, Selangor
20:45 UTC+08:00

Monday 2 July	USM (Penang)	1 - 2	ATM	USM Athletics Stadium, Penang
20:45 UTC+08:00	S. Veenod 45'		Hairuddin Omar 4'; Venice Elphi 56'

Monday 2 July	PDRM	1 - 0	(Malaysia) Harimau Muda B	Tuanku Abdul Rahman Stadium, Paroi, Negeri Sembilan
20:45 UTC+08:00

=== Week 21 ===
Friday 6 July	Sime Darby (Kuala Lumpur)	3 – 0	PDRM	Majlis Perbandaran Selayang Stadium, Selayang, Selangor
20:45 UTC+08:00

Friday 6 July	Johor	4 – 0	(Penang) USM	Tan Sri Dato Hj Hassan Yunos Stadium, Johor Bahru, Johor
20:45 UTC+08:00

Friday 6 July	Harimau Muda B (Malaysia)	3 – 0	(Negeri Sembilan) Betaria	Shah Alam Stadium, Shah Alam, Selangor
20:45 UTC+08:00

Friday 6 July	Pahang	3 – 1	(Kuala Lumpur) Pos Malaysia	Temerloh Mini Stadium, Temerloh, Pahang
20:45 UTC+08:00

Friday 6 July	ATM	8 – 1	(Johor) MP Muar	MBPJ Stadium, Petaling Jaya, Selangor
20:45 UTC+08:00

Friday 6 July	Perlis	4 – 0	MB Johor Bahru	Utama Stadium, Kangar, Perlis
20:45 UTC+08:00

=== Week 22 ===
Friday 13 July	MP Muar (Johor)	2 – 3	Johor	Sultan Ibrahim Stadium, Muar, Johor
20:45 UTC+08:00

Friday 13 July	Betaria (Negeri Sembilan)	0 – 4	(Kuala Lumpur) Sime Darby	Hang Tuah Stadium, Malacca
20:45 UTC+08:00

Friday 13 July	Pos Malaysia (Kuala Lumpur)	0 – 2	ATM	Majlis Perbandaran Selayang Stadium, Selayang, Selangor
20:45 UTC+08:00			Hairuddin Omar 14'; Venice 25'

Friday 13 July	MB Johor Bahru	0 – 6	(Malaysia) Harimau Muda B	Tan Sri Dato Hj Hassan Yunos Stadium, Johor Bahru, Johor
20:45 UTC+08:00

Friday 13 July	USM (Penang)	4 – 1	Perlis	USM Athletics Stadium, Penang
20:45 UTC+08:00

Friday 13 July	PDRM	4 – 2	Pahang	Tuanku Abdul Rahman Stadium, Paroi, Negeri Sembilan
20:45 UTC+08:00

== Results table ==
Home \ Away	ATM	BET	HMB	JHR	MBJB	MUAR	PHG	PDRM	PER	POS	SDA	USM
ATM		2–0	2–0	3–2	7–1	8–1	3–2	2–2	7–0	0–2	2–1	4–0
BET	0–7		3–2	1–1	4–1	1–2	0–4	1–1	2–1	0–4	0–4	1–6
Harimau Muda B	0–1	3–0		1–1	0–0	2–2	0–4	1–4	3–1	1–0	0–3	2–1
JHR	1–4	3–0	3–1		5–0	4–1	2–0	1–1	4–0	0–0	2–1	4–0
MBJB	0–5	2–3	0–6	0–2		0–2	0–5	2–5	1–6	0–3	0–3	1–1
MUAR	2–2	1–2	1–5	2–3	5–2		1–5	0–3	7–2	2–0	0–0	3–2
PHG	3–3	2–0	3–2	2–0	1–0	5–1		2–3	7–2	3–1	2–1	1–1
PDRM	0–2	3–1	1–0	0–2	3–5	4–1	4–2		4–2	2–2	1–1	2–0
Perlis	0–4	1–0	0–1	3–3	4–0	3–0	2–2	3–5		1–2	1–2	1–2
POS	0–2	2–3	2–1	0–3	3–2	4–0	1–1	1–0	3–3		0–4	0–0
Sime Darby	2–1	5–0	2–1	1–0	3–1	6–0	2–3	3–0	5–1	1–1		4–1
USM	1–2	2–1	3–1	2–1	3–0	4–2	0–1	4–2	4–1	2–1	2–0	

Updated to match(es) played on 13 July 2012. Source: Liga Super
Legend: Blue = home team win; Yellow = draw; Red = away team win.

== Play-offs ==
=== Liga Super/Liga Premier ===
The play-off matches to determine promotion and relegation will be held at Hang Tuah Stadium and Hang Jebat Stadium, Malacca from 17 July to 19 July 2012, as next season Liga Super will be reduced to 12 teams from 14 teams this season. Team that finished 11th in the Liga Super, Sarawak will meet second placed team in Liga Premier, Pahang while team that finished 12th in the Liga Super, Kedah will meet team that finished 13th in the Liga Super, Sabah. The winner of both semi-final match will meet in the final to determine who will stay in the 2013 Liga Super. The winner will stay in the Liga Super; the other 3 teams will be relegated to 2013 Liga Premier.

Semi-final 1

17 July 2012
20:45 UTC+08:00

Pahang	1 – 0	Sarawak
Saifulnizam 89'

Hang Jebat Stadium, Malacca

Semi-final 2

17 July 2012
20:45 UTC+08:00

Kedah	1 – 0	Sabah
Syamim Alif 90+1'

Hang Tuah Stadium, Malacca

Final

19 July 2012
20:45 UTC+08:00

Pahang	2 – 2	Kedah
Hafiz Kamal 7'; Boris Kochkin 43' (pen.)		Khyril Muhymeen 49'; Baddrol Bakhtiar 68'
Penalties
Maycon (penalty missed); Zaiza (penalty scored); Faizol Hussain (penalty scored); Azamuddin (penalty missed); Shahrizan Salleh (penalty missed); Jalaluddin Jaafar (penalty scored)	3 – 2	(penalty scored) Fauzi Nan; (penalty missed) Fazliata Taib; (penalty missed) See Kok Luen; (penalty scored) Baddrol Bakhtiar; (penalty missed) Syamim Alif; (penalty missed) Khairul Helmi

Hang Jebat Stadium, Malacca

=== Liga Premier/FAM League ===
The play-off matches to determine promotion and relegation was held at Hang Tuah Stadium and Hang Jebat Stadium, Malacca on 17 July 2012. Team that finished 7th in the Liga Premier, Pos Malaysia met second placed team in FAM League, Shahzan Muda, while team that finished 9th in the Liga Premier, MP Muar met team that finished 10th in the Liga Premier, Betaria. The winner of both matches stay in the Liga Premier; the losing teams will be relegated to 2013 Liga FAM.

Pos Malaysia and MP Muar won their respective matches and thus stay in Liga Premier next season. Losing teams are Shahzan Muda and Betaria; both will play in FAM League next season. Later, as a result of MP Muar decision to pull out of the league, another play-off match was arranged between Betaria and UiTM, the 3rd place club in the FAM League. Betaria won the match and retained their place in the Liga Premier.

Match 1

17 July 2012
16:45 UTC+08:00

Shahzan Muda (Pahang)	1 – 5	(Kuala Lumpur) Pos Malaysia
Muhd Helmi 70' (pen.)		Fakhrul Aiman 5' 41'; G. Puaneswaran 15'; Hanifuddin 17'; Hafizi Amiruddin 75' (pen.)

Hang Jebat Stadium, Malacca

Match 2

17 July 2012
16:45 UTC+08:00

MP Muar (Johor)	3 – 0	(Negeri Sembilan) Betaria
Echesa 33'; Efendi Malek 72'; Mohd Alafi 89'

Hang Tuah Stadium, Malacca

Match 3

6 October 2012
20:45 UTC+08:00

Betaria (Negeri Sembilan)	3 – 0	(Selangor) UiTM
Nasrullah 6'; Khairul Azlan 29'; Nasrullah 35'

Petaling Jaya Stadium, Selangor

== Season statistics ==
=== Top scorers ===
Rank	Scorer	Club	Goal
1	(Malaysia) Khairul Izuan Abdullah	PDRM	23
2	(Saint Vincent and the Grenadines) Marlon Alex James	ATM	21
3	(Liberia) Patrick Wleh	Sime Darby	13
4	(Malaysia) Hairuddin Omar	ATM	12
5	(Malaysia) Mohd Alafi Mahmud	MUAR	9
5	(Malaysia) Mohd Azamuddin Md Akil	PHG	9
5	(Sierra Leone) Lamin Conteh	Perlis	9
8	(Malaysia) S. Veenod	USM	8
9	(Uganda) Edrisar Kaye	USM	7
9	(Argentina) Muriel Orlando	JHR	7
11	(Malaysia) Mohd Zamri Hassan	Sime Darby	6
12	(Malaysia) Azmi Sarmin	MBJB	5
12	(Trinidad and Tobago) Kordell Devone Samuel	PDRM	5
12	(Malaysia) G. Puaneswaran	POS	5
15	(Argentina) Bruno Martelotto	ATM	4
15	(Malaysia) Fauzi Abd Kadar	BET	4
15	(Malaysia) Norhamizaref Hamid	Harimau Muda B	4
15	(Malaysia) Fauzzi Kassim	JHR	4
15	(Malaysia) Khairul Anwar Shaharudin	MUAR	4
15	(Malaysia) Fauzi Roslan	PHG	4
15	(Malaysia) Mohd Hazuan Mohd Daud	PHG	4
15	(Russia) Eduard Sakhnevich	PHG	4
15	(Malaysia) Mohd Hanifuddin Abdul Rahman	POS	4
15	(Sierra Leone) Henry Lewis	Perlis	4
25	(Malaysia) Christie Jayaseelan	ATM	3
25	(Malaysia) Mohd Zaquan Adha	ATM	3
25	(Malaysia) Mohd Saufi Ibrahim	BET	3
25	(Nigeria) Michael Chukwubunna	BET	3
25	(Malaysia) Muhd Hadin Azman	Harimau Muda B	3
25	(Malaysia) Mohd Hamzani Omar	JHR	3
25	(Malaysia) Mohd Ezaidy Khadar	MUAR	3
25	(Malaysia) Abdul Malik Arif	PHG	3
25	(Malaysia) R.Gopinathan	PHG	3
25	(Brazil) Maycon Carvalho Inez	PHG	3
25	(Malaysia) Fauzi Abd Majid	PDRM	3
25	(Malaysia) Mohd Rizal Mohd Ghazali	Perlis	3
25	(Malaysia) Fakhrul Aiman	POS	3
25	(Malaysia) Mohd Hafizi Amiruddin	POS	3
25	(Malaysia) Irme Mat	Sime Darby	3
25	(Malaysia) Razali Umar Kandasamy	Sime Darby	3
25	(Liberia) Sengbah Kennedy	Sime Darby	3
25	(Malaysia) Afzan Zainal Abidin	USM	3
25	(Malaysia) Khairul Anwar Idris	USM	3
25	(Uganda) Jerome Katende	USM	3

=== Clean sheets ===
- Most clean sheets: 4
  - ATM
- Fewest clean sheets: 0
  - MB Johor Bahru
  - Perlis
  - Harimau Muda B
  - MP Muar

== Foreign players ==
Club	Visa 1	Visa 2
ATM	(Argentina) Bruno Martelotto	(Saint Vincent and the Grenadines) Marlon Alex James
Betaria	(Nigeria) Ijezie Michael Chukwubunna	(Nigeria) Junior John Bamidale Emmanuel
Harimau Muda B^{*}	None	None
Johor	(Brazil) André Francisco Williams Rocha da Silva	(Argentina) Muriel Orlando
MB Johor Bahru	(Cameroon) Fokim Fon Fondo	(Bosnia and Herzegovina) Dalibor Dragic
MP Muar	(Zambia) Evans Chisulo	(Kenya) Hillary Echesa
Pahang	(Russia) Boris Kochkin	(Brazil) Maycon Carvalho Inez
Perlis	(Sierra Leone) Lamin Conteh	(Sierra Leone) Mahmadu Alphajor Bah
PDRM	(Trinidad and Tobago) Samuel Kordell	
Pos Malaysia		
Sime Darby	(Liberia) Patrick Ronaldinho Wleh	(Brazil) Leandro Teofilo Santos Pinto
USM	(Uganda) Edrisar Kaye	(Uganda) Katende Joram

Note:

- ^{*} Harimau Muda B will not be permitted any foreign player as the team represents the Malaysia national under-19 football team

== See also ==
- List of Liga Premier seasons
- 2012 Liga Super
- 2012 Liga FAM
- 2012 Piala FA
