= 2013 Malaysia Premier League =

Liga Premier
- Season: 2013
- Champions: Sarawak; 1st title
- Promoted: Sarawak; Sime Darby
- Relegated: Kuala Lumpur; Betaria
- Matches played: 113
- Goals scored: 349 (3.09 per match)
- Top goalscorer: (Croatia) Karlo Primorac (24 goals)
- Biggest home win: Sarawak 7–0 Betaria (17 May 2013)
- Biggest away win: Kuala Lumpur 0–5 Sime Darby (17 May 2013)
- Highest scoring: 8 goals UiTM 3-5 Sarawak (26 April 2013)

The 2013 Liga Premier (English: 2013 Premier League), also known as the Astro Liga Premier for sponsorship reasons, was the 10th season of the Liga Premier, the second-tier professional football league in Malaysia.

The season was held from 7 January and concluded on 5 July 2013.

The Liga Premier champions for 2013 season was Sarawak. The champions and runners-up were both promoted to 2014 Liga Super.

== Team changes ==
=== To Liga Premier ===
Relegated from Liga Super

- Sarawak
- Kedah
- Sabah
- Kuala Lumpur

Promoted from Liga FAM

- SPA

=== From Liga Premier ===
Promoted to Liga Super

- ATM
- Pahang

Relegated to Liga FAM

- MB Johor Bahru

=== Team withdrawing ===
- MP Muar
- USM
- MB Johor Bahru

=== Name changes ===
- Johor FA were merge with Johor FC and renamed to Johor (later as JDT II) and relocated to Pasir Gudang, Johor.

== Teams ==
A total of twelve teams will contest the league. The teams competing includes the sides finishing 3rd to 6th from the 2012 Liga Premier season, Harimau Muda B who will stay in the league regardless of league position, the champion of 2012 Malaysia FAM League, and the bottom team from the 2012 Liga Super season. The remaining 5 places in the league will be contested in the playoff round between teams from Liga Super, Liga Premier and FAM League.

FAM later decided to withdraw Harimau Muda B from the league and register them in the 2013 S.League, replacing Harimau Muda A who pulled out of the S.League to embark on a tour of friendly matches in Europe, and preparing them for the 2013 Southeast Asian Games. Perlis, who originally were relegated after finishing second bottom in 2012 Liga Premier, were reinstated in the league as a result of the withdrawal.

Kuala Lumpur were relegated from 2012 Liga Super after finishing the season in the last place of the 14-team league table. Sarawak, Kedah and Sabah were also relegated after losing in the play-offs.

2012 Malaysia FAM League champions SPA secured direct promotion to this season Liga Premier. Meanwhile UiTM, the 3rd-place team in FAM League, were invited to replace USM FC, who were withdrawing from Liga Premier due to financial difficulties.

=== Team summaries ===
==== Stadium ====
Team	Team Based	Stadium Location	Stadium	Stadium Capacity
Betaria	Tampin	Paya Rumput	Hang Jebat Stadium	40,000
Johor	Johor Bahru	Pasir Gudang	Pasir Gudang Corporation Stadium	15,000
Kedah	Alor Star	Alor Star	Darulaman Stadium	32,387
Perlis	Kangar	Kangar	Utama Negeri Stadium	20,000
Sabah	Kota Kinabalu	Kota Kinabalu	Likas Stadium	30,000
Sarawak	Kuching	Kuching	Sarawak Stadium	40,000
Kuala Lumpur	Kuala Lumpur	Kuala Lumpur	KLFA Stadium	18,000
PDRM	Kuala Lumpur	Paya Rumput	Hang Jebat Stadium	40,000
Pos Malaysia	Kuala Lumpur	Selayang	Majlis Perbandaran Selayang Stadium	25,000
Sime Darby	Kuala Lumpur	Selayang	Majlis Perbandaran Selayang Stadium	25,000
SPA	Putrajaya	Bangi	Petronas Mini Stadium	3,000
UiTM	Selangor	Shah Alam	UiTM Stadium	10,000

=== Personnel and sponsoring ===
Team	Coach	Captain	Kit manufacturer	Shirt sponsor
Betaria	(Malaysia) Azuan Zain	(Malaysia) Muhd Shahrul Nizam Abdul Hamid	Adidas	
Johor	(Malaysia) Azmi Mohamed	(Malaysia) Mohd Farid Ramli	Kappa	Iskandar Regional Development Authority (IRDA)
Kedah	(Croatia) Marijo Tot	(Malaysia) Baddrol Bakhtiar	Line 7	PKNK
Kuala Lumpur	(Slovakia) Stanislav Lievkosky	(Malaysia) Azizon Abdul Kadir	Kronos	Rising Sun Travel & Tours
Perlis	(Malaysia) Yunus Alif	(Ghana) Emmanuel Okine	Warriors	
PDRM	(Malaysia) R. Nalathamby	(Malaysia) Mohd Afif Amiruddin	Line 7	
Pos Malaysia	(Malaysia) G. Torairaju	(Malaysia) Abdullah Yusoff	Kappa	Pos Malaysia
Sabah	(Northern Ireland) David McCreery	(Wales) Rhys Weston	Adidas	Grace One
Sarawak	(Netherlands) Robert Alberts	(Malaysia) Mohd Shahrol Saperi	Starsports	NAIM Holdings Berhad
Sime Darby	(Malaysia) Ismail Zakaria		Kappa	Sime Darby
SPA	(Malaysia) Mohd Nizam Jamil	(Malaysia) Sazali Suwandi	Kappa	
UiTM	(Malaysia) Azman Eusoff		Umbro	Ministry of Higher Education

=== Coaching changes ===
==== Pre-season ====
Club	Outgoing Head Coach	Date of vacancy	Manner of departure	Incoming Head Coach	Date of appointment
Kuala Lumpur	(Malaysia) Razip Ismail	13 November 2012	Signed by Harimau Muda B	(Slovakia) Stanislav Lievkosky	4 December 2012

== Foreign players ==
Club	Visa 1	Visa 2	Asian Players
Betaria	(Slovakia) Tomáš Chovanec	(Kenya) Hillary Echesa	None
Johor	(Argentina) Muriel Orlando	(Argentina) Ezaquiel Gallegos	None
Kedah	(Chile) Nelson San Martín	(Croatia) Alen Guć	None
Kuala Lumpur	(Cameroon) Kalle Sone		None
Perlis	(Ghana) Denny Antwi	(Ghana) Emmanuel Okine	None
PDRM	(Uganda) Edrisar Kaye	(The Gambia) Mohamadou Sumareh	None
Pos Malaysia	None	None	None
Sabah	(France) Abdulfatah Safi	(Ivory Coast) Koh Traore	None
Sarawak	(Cameroon) Guy Bwele	(Bosnia and Herzegovina) Muamer Salibasic	None
Sime Darby	(Croatia) Karlo Primorac	(Togo) Togaba Kontiwa Komlan	None
SPA	(Cameroon) Joël Tchami	(Guadeloupe) Eddy Viator	None
UiTM	(Nigeria) Koforowola Hameed Adewumi	None	None

== League table ==
Pos	Team	Pld	W	D	L	GF	GA	GD	Pts	Promotion or relegation
1	Sarawak (C, P)	22	18	4	0	49	12	+37	58	Promotion to 2014 Liga Super
2	Sime Darby (P)	22	17	3	2	51	12	+39	54	Promotion to 2014 Liga Super
3	Johor	22	14	3	5	58	23	+35	45	
4	Kedah	22	13	3	6	38	19	+19	42	
5	Sabah	22	9	3	10	42	46	−4	30	
6	Pos Malaysia	22	7	6	9	24	28	−4	27	
7	PDRM	22	7	4	11	41	39	+2	25	
8	SPA	22	6	5	11	29	38	−9	23	
9	UiTM	22	6	5	11	22	35	−13	23	
10	Perlis	22	6	4	12	27	42	−15	22	
11	Kuala Lumpur (R)	22	4	2	16	21	58	−37	14	Relegation to 2014 Malaysia FAM League
12	Betaria (R)	22	2	4	16	13	63	−50	10	Relegation to 2014 Malaysia FAM League

Updated to match(es) played on 5 July 2013. Source: fam.org and Rec.Sport.Soccer Statistics Foundation
Rules for classification: 1) points; 2) goal difference; 3) number of goals scored.
(C) Champions; (P) Promoted; (R) Relegated

== Results ==
Home \ Away	BET	JHR	KED	KLU	PDRM	PER	POS	SAB	SWK	SDA	SPA	UIT
Betaria		0–2	0–0	3–2	1–3	1–1	1–1	1–4	0–1	0–6	0–2	0–1
Johor	43–2		1–0	5–1	2–1	6–1	1–1	6–1	1–2	0–0	5–1	2–0
Kedah	36–4	2–1		3–0	4–1	1–2	1–0	3–2	1–1	1–2	2–1	1–1
Kuala Lumpur	12–2	1–3	0–1		0–4	0–2	0–3	3–2	0–1	0–5	0–0	2–1
PDRM	15–4	2–3	2–0	4–1		2–3	1–1	3–3	1–11	0–2	3–3	0–0
Perlis	17–1	0–4	0–1	0–1	3–1		1–3	1–1	1–2	0–2	1–1	1–1
Pos Malaysia	14–0	0–2	1–5	3–2	0–1	0–1		1–0	0–3	1–1	1–1	1–0
Sabah	46–1	3–2	0–2	3–1	5–3	3–2	1–2		1–2	1–5	2–1	3–1
SWK	61–0	8–2	4–0	8–0	7–0	2–0	2–0	0–0		6–0	7–1	10–0
Sime Darby	53–0	1–0	2–1	5–1	3–2	4–1	2–0	3–1	0–0		2–1	2–0
Putrajaya SPA	10–3	1–3	1–2	1–3	1–0	4–2	1–0	2–4	1–1	1–0		0–1
UiTM	13–1	2–2	0–2	3–1	0–2	2–0	1–1	2–0	3–5	0–2	1–2	

Updated to match(es) played on 5 July 2013. Source: Stadium Astro
Legend: Blue = home team win; Yellow = draw; Red = away team win.

== Season statistics ==
=== Top scorers ===
As of 22 May 2013

Rank	Player	Club	Goals
1	(Malaysia) Bobby Gonzales	Sarawak	20
2	(Argentina) Muriel Orlando	Johor	17
3	(Ivory Coast) Koh Traore	Sabah	15
4	(Malaysia) Mohd Saufi Ibrahim	Pos Malaysia	12
5	(Malaysia) Mohd Khyril Muhymeen Zambri	Kedah	9
5	(Malaysia) Mohd Farid Ideris	Johor	9
6	(Malaysia) Khairul Izuan Abdullah	PDRM	8
7	(Malaysia) Muhd Khairul Akhyar Hussain	PDRM	7
8	(Croatia) Alen Guć	Kedah	6

=== Own goals ===
Rank	Player	For	Club	Goals
1	(India) Marlon Alex james	SPA	PDRM	

=== Clean sheets ===
- Most clean sheets:
- Fewest clean sheets:

== See also ==
- List of Liga Premier seasons
- 2013 Liga Super
- 2013 Malaysia FAM League
- 2013 Piala FA
