= 2015 PDRM FA season =

PDRM
2015 season
- President: Datuk Seri Noor Rashid Ibrahim
- Head Coach: Azman Adnan
- Stadium: Shah Alam Stadium
- Super League: 6th
- FA Cup: Round of 16
- Malaysia Cup: Group Stage
- Top goalscorer: League: Dramane Traore (19); All: Dramane Traore (23)

The 2015 season was PDRM FA's 1st season in the Malaysia Super League after having been promoted from the Malaysia Premier League as champions.

== Kit and sponsorship ==
- Kit Supplier: Line Seven
- Sponsor: Perkasa Jauhari

== Coaching staff ==
Position	Name
General Manager	(Malaysia) Abdul Mubin Mokhtar
Assistant manager	(Malaysia)
Head coach	(Malaysia) Azman Adnan
Assistant coach	(Malaysia) Mohd Fauzi Pilus
Coach	(Malaysia) Mohd Nazrulerwan Makmor
Goalkeeping coach	(Malaysia) Azlisham Ibrahim
Fitness coach	(Malaysia) Mohamad Hafiz Tajudin
Physiotherapist	(Malaysia) Mohd Khalid Mohd Sain
Safety Officer & Koordinator I	(Malaysia) Mohd Noorzaihan Aziz
Safety Officer & Koordinator II	(Malaysia) Mohd Khusyairi Zulkapli
Safety Officer	(Malaysia) Muhamad Hafizi Nooraldin
Media Officer	(Malaysia) Omar Hamzah

== Pre-season and friendlies ==
Win Draw Loss Upcoming fixture

16 December 2014	Hong Kong Rangers	1 – 1	PDRM	Kowloon, Hong Kong
11:15 UTC+08:00				Stadium: Kowloon Bay Sports Ground

17 December 2014	Sun Pegasus	1 – 1	PDRM	Kowloon, Hong Kong
15:00 UTC+08:00				Stadium: Mong Kok Stadium

4 January 2015	Zob Ahan	2 – 2	PDRM
15:00 UTC+08:00

9 January 2015	PDRM	2 – 2	Kuantan	Malaysia

20 January 2015	PDRM	2 – 1	Hougang United

22 January 2015 POMIS Cup group stage	PDRM	1 – 0	New Radiant SC	Malé, Maldives
21:00 UTC+5	Sumareh 63'			Stadium: National Football Stadium

24 January 2015 POMIS Cup group stage	PDRM	2 – 2	Maziya S&RC	Malé, Maldives
21:00 UTC+5	Traoré 40', 61'		Rodríguez 27', 59'	Stadium: National Football Stadium

24 January 2015 POMIS Cup group stage	PDRM	1 – 0	LionsXII	Malé, Maldives
21:00 UTC+5	Traoré 52' (pen.)			Stadium: National Football Stadium

24 January 2015 POMIS Cup final	PDRM	5 – 4 (a.e.t.)	Maziya S&RC	Malé, Maldives
21:00 UTC+5	Traoré 12', 96'; Ashfaq 24', 51', 108'	Report	Irufaan 73'; Assadhulla 86' (pen.); Imaaz 90+1'; Rodríguez 112'	Stadium: National Football Stadium; Referee: Shifan Abdul Raheem (Maldives)

15 May 2015	PDRM	8 – 1	KL Warrior	Malaysia
17:00 UTC+8

26 May 2015	PDRM	3 – 3	PKNS	Kelana Jaya, Malaysia
20:45 UTC+8

== Competitions ==
=== Overview ===
Competition	Record							
Competition	G	W	D	L	GF	GA	GD	Win %
Super League	10	6	0	4	23	18	+5	60.00
FA Cup	2	1	0	1	5	4	+1	50.00
Malaysia Cup	0	0	0	0	0	0	+0	—
Total	12	7	0	5	28	22	+6	58.33

Updated to match played 2 May 2015
Source: Competitions

=== Malaysia Super League ===
==== League table ====
Pos	Team	Pld	W	D	L	GF	GA	GD	Pts
4	Terengganu	22	12	2	8	40	33	+7	38
5	Felda United	22	10	6	6	36	26	+10	36
6	PDRM	22	11	2	9	42	39	+3	35
7	LionsXII (Note: LionsXII are not eligible for any AFC competition spots)	22	9	6	7	36	32	+4	33
8	Perak	22	8	4	10	32	33	−1	28

Source: FAM Official Site, Astro Arena
Rules for classification: 1) points; 2) goal difference; 3) number of goals scored

==== Results summary ====
Overall								Home						Away					
Pld	W	D	L	GF	GA	GD	Pts	W	D	L	GF	GA	GD	W	D	L	GF	GA	GD
10	6	0	4	23	18	+5	18	3	0	1	6	5	+1	3	0	3	17	13	+4

Last updated: 2 May 2015.
Source: Malaysia Super League

==== Results by matchday ====
Matchday	1	2	3	4	5	6	7	8	9	10	11	12	13	14	15	16	17	18	19	20	21	22
Ground	A	H	A	H	A	H	A	A	H	A	H											
Result	L	W	W	L	W	W	L	W	W	L												
Position	8	8	3	6	2	1	5	4	1	2												

A = Away; H = Home; W = Win; D = Draw; L = Loss

==== Matches ====
Win Draw Loss Upcoming fixture

7 February 2015 1	LionsXII	5 – 3	PDRM	Jalan Besar Stadium, Kallang, Singapore
19:45 UTC+08:00	Gabriel Quak 21'; Faris 45'; Izzdin 48'; Hafiz Sujad 56'	Report	Traore 69' (pen.), 80', 90'	Attendance: 5,288; Referee: Shamsudin Bin Ibrahim

14 February 2015 2	PDRM	1 – 0	Johor Darul Ta'zim	Shah Alam Stadium, Shah Alam, Selangor
20:45 UTC+08:00	Sumareh 76'	Report		Attendance: 4,500; Referee: Suhaizi Shukri

21 February 2015 3	Kelantan	0 – 4	PDRM	Sultan Muhammad IV Stadium, Kota Bharu, Kelantan
20:45 UTC+08:00		Report	Ashfaq 45+2', 72'; Traore 54' (pen.); Sumareh 85'	Attendance: 19,500; Referee: Mohd Nafeez Abd Wahab

7 March 2015 4	PDRM	1 – 4	Selangor	Shah Alam Stadium, Shah Alam, Selangor
20:45 UTC+08:00	Traore 59'	Report	Hazwan 23'; Afiq 46'; Hadi 75' de Paula 78'	Attendance: 7,000; Referee: Muhammad Nazmi Nasaruddin

14 March 2015 5	Perak	1 – 3	PDRM	Stadium Perak, Ipoh, Perak
20:45 UTC+08:00	Nurridzuan 47'	Report	Traore 48', 61'; Ezrie 56'	Attendance: 9,000; Referee: Samsudin Ibrahim

3 April 2015 6	PDRM	1 – 0	Sarawak	Shah Alam Stadium, Shah Alam, Selangor
20:45 UTC+08:00	Traoré 33'	Report		Attendance: 1,000; Referee: Wan Tarmizi Wan Ibrahim

11 April 2015 7	Felda United	3 – 2	PDRM	Selayang Stadium, Selayang, Selangor
20:45 UTC+08:00	Syamim 28'; Makeche 86'; Edward Wilson 90+3'	Report	Muslim 23'; Ashfaq 32'	Attendance: 585; Referee: Mohd Zohri Tajuddin

18 April 2015 8	Sime Darby	1 – 4	PDRM	Selayang Stadium, Selayang, Selangor
20:45 UTC+08:00	Reinaldo 75' (pen.)	Report	Ashfaq 36', 47'; Sumareh 52'; Fauzi 90+4'	Attendance: 400; Referee: Suhaizi Shukri

25 April 2015 9	PDRM	3 – 1	Terengganu	Shah Alam Stadium, Shah Alam, Selangor
20:45 UTC+08:00	Shahurain 9'; Traore 17'; Ashfaq 21'	Report	Nakajima-Farran 90+1'	Attendance: 1,000; Referee: Nagor Amir Noor Mohamed

2 May 2015 10	ATM	3 – 1	PDRM	Tuanku Abdul Rahman Stadium, Paroi, Negeri Sembilan
20:45 UTC+08:00	Venice 18'; Hairuddin 56', 61'	Report	Afif 19'	Attendance: 1,050; Referee: Muhd Zamzaidi Katimin

20 June 2015 11	PDRM	v	Pahang	Shah Alam Stadium, Shah Alam, Selangor
21:45 UTC+08:00

23 June 2015 12	Pahang	v	PDRM	Darul Makmur Stadium, Kuantan, Pahang
21:45 UTC+08:00

=== Malaysia FA Cup ===
27 February 2015 1st round	PDRM	3 – 0	Sabah	Shah Alam Stadium, Shah Alam, Selangor
20:45 UTC+08:00	Ashfaq 27'; Traoré 40', 45'			Attendance: 1,000; Referee: Muhd Nazmi Nasaruddin

17 March 2015 2nd round	Sime Darby	4 – 2	PDRM	Selayang Stadium, Shah Alam, Selangor
20:45 UTC+08:00	Sharofetdinov 45'; Dragičević 50'; Vidaković 76', 80'		Traoré 1'; Sumareh 65'	Attendance: 750; Referee: Lismotia Mohem Mohd Tisan

== Squad statistics ==
=== Appearances and goalscorers ===
No.	Pos.	Name	League		FA Cup		Malaysia Cup		Total	
No.	Pos.	Name	Apps	Goals	Apps	Goals	Apps	Goals	Apps	Goals
1	GK	(Malaysia) Wilfried Jabun	3	0	0	0	0	0	3	0
2	MF	(Malaysia) Muhd Eskandar Ismail	0(1)	0	0	0	0	0	0(1)	0
3	DF	(Malaysia) Arman Fareez Ali	3(1)	0	1	0	0	0	4(1)	0
4	MF	(Malaysia) Ahmad Nizam Mohd Rodzi	7	0	2	0	0	0	9	0
5	DF	(Malaysia) Mohd Fadhil Mohd Hashim	1(1)	0	1	0	0	0	2(1)	0
7	FW	(Maldives) Ali Ashfaq	9	6	1	1	0	0	10	1
8	MF	(Malaysia) Ahmad Ezrie Shafizie Sazali	9	1	2	0	0	0	11	2
9	MF	(Malaysia) Shahurain Abu Samah	3(6)	1	1	0	0	0	4(6)	1
10	FW	(Mali) Dramane Traore	10	9	2	3	0	0	12	12
11	MF	(Malaysia) Lot Abu Hassan	1	0	0	0	0	0	1	0
12	MF	(Malaysia) Mohd Nurul Azwan Roya	3(2)	0	0	0	0	0	3(2)	0
13	MF	(Malaysia) Mohd Fauzi Abdul Majid	6(4)	1	2	0	0	0	8(2)	1
14	MF	(Malaysia) Mohd Alafi Mahmud	0	0	0(1)	0	0	0	0(1)	0
15	MF	(Malaysia) Mohd Azrul Azman	0(1)	0	0	0	0	0	0(1)	0
16	MF	(Malaysia) Mohd Faizal Abu Bakar	0(2)	0	0	0	0	0	0(2)	0
17	DF	(Malaysia) V. Thirumurugan	7(1)	0	1(1)	0	0	0	7(1)	0
18	MF	(Malaysia) Muhd Asyidi Dil Ashar Yusof	0(3)	0	0	0	0	0	0(3)	0
19	DF	(Malaysia) Mohd Afif Amiruddin	9	1	2	0	0	0	11	1
20	MF	(Malaysia) Isma Alif Mohd Salim	4(1)	0	0	0	0	0	4(1)	0
22	GK	(Malaysia) Badrulzaman Abdul Halim	6	0	2	0	0	0	8	0
23	DF	(Malaysia) Mohd Fekry Tajudin	3(1)	0	0	0	0	0	3(1)	0
24	DF	(Malaysia) Mohd Muslim Ahmad (C)	9	1	2	0	0	0	11	1
25	GK	(Malaysia) Saiful Amar Sudar	1	0	0	0	0	0	1	0
26	MF	(The Gambia) Mohamadou Sumareh	10	3	2	1	0	0	12	4
28	FW	(Malaysia) Khairul Izuan Abdullah	0	0	0	0	0	0	0	0
32	FW	(Malaysia) Haziq Fikri Hussein	0	0	0	0	0	0	0	0
50	MF	(Portugal) Jaime Bragança	0(2)	0	0	0	0	0	0(2)	0
Former player(s)
21	DF	(Nigeria) Onorionde Kughegbe	5	0	2	0	0	0	7	0

=== Disciplinary record ===
No.	Pos.	Name	League		FA Cup		Malaysia Cup		Total	
No.	Pos.	Name	Booked	Sent off (straight red)	Booked	Sent off (straight red)	Booked	Sent off (straight red)	Booked	Sent off (straight red)
4	MF	(Malaysia) Ahmad Nizam Mohd Rodzi	3	0	2	0	0	0	5	0
21	DF	(Nigeria) Onorionde Kughegbe**	2	0	2	0	0	0	4	0
3	DF	(Malaysia) Arman Fareez Ali	3	1	0	0	0	0	3	1
19	DF	(Malaysia) Mohd Afif Amiruddin	2	0	0	0	0	0	2	0
24	DF	(Malaysia) Mohd Muslim Ahmad	2	0	0	0	0	0	2	0
8	MF	(Malaysia) Ahmad Ezrie Shafizie Sazali	1	0	1	0	0	0	2	0
9	MF	(Malaysia) Shahurain Abu Samah	1	0	1	0	0	0	2	0
17	DF	(Malaysia) V. Thirumurugan	1	0	0	0	0	0	1	0
23	MF	(Malaysia) Mohd Fekry Tajudin	1	0	0	0	0	0	1	0

** Players who no longer play for PDRM's current season

== Transfers ==
=== In ===
Entry date	Position	No.	Player	From club	Fee
Nov 2014	GK		(Malaysia) Saiful Amar Sudar	(Malaysia) Kedah FA	
Nov 2014	GK		(Malaysia) Badrulzaman Abdul Halim	(Malaysia) Negeri Sembilan FA	
Nov 2014	DRC		(Malaysia) Muhd Eskandar Ismail	(Malaysia)	
Nov 2014	DC		(Nigeria) Onorionde Kughegbe	(Indonesia) Persebaya Surabaya	
Nov 2014	AMRC		(Malaysia) Shahurain Abu Samah	(Malaysia) PKNS F.C.	
Nov 2014	AMC		(Malaysia) Muhd Asyidi Dil Ashar Yusof	(Malaysia) Putrajaya SPA F.C.	
Nov 2014	AML		(Malaysia) Isma Alif Mohd Salim	(Malaysia) Sabah FA	
Nov 2014	AMLC		(Malaysia) Nurul Azwan Roya	(Malaysia) Johor Darul Ta'zim F.C.	
Nov 2014	AMRC		(Malaysia) Mohd Faizal Abu Bakar	(Malaysia) Kedah FA	
Nov 2014	AMRC		(Malaysia) Lot Abu Hassan	(Malaysia) Sarawak FA	
Nov 2014	ST		(Malaysia) Haziq Fikri Hussein	(Malaysia) Kuantan FA (Loan Return)	
Nov 2014	ST		(Mali) Dramane Traoré	Free Agents	
Nov 2014	DL		(Malaysia) Mohd Shafiq Rosdi	(Malaysia) Kedah FA	
Nov 2014	DL		(Malaysia) Muhd Farhan Abdul Hamid	(Malaysia) Kuala Lumpur FA	
Nov 2014	DC		(Malaysia) Muhd Nur Zhafri Zaini	(Malaysia) Kedah FA	
Nov 2014	DC		(Malaysia) Osman Damanhuri	(Malaysia) Perak FA	
Nov 2014	MC		(Malaysia) Muhd Amirul Abas	(Malaysia) Kuala Lumpur FA	
Nov 2014	MR/AMR		(Malaysia) Mohd Syafiq Redzuan Mohd Pauzee	(Malaysia) Kedah FA	
Nov 2014	ST		(Malaysia) Nur Fahmi Mohd Pauzee	(Malaysia) Kuala Lumpur FA	
Nov 2014	ST		(Malaysia) Nur Saiful Abdul Rahman	(Malaysia) Perak FA	
26 Apr 2015	ML/AML		(Portugal) Jaime Bragança	(Brazil) Vila Nova Futebol Clube	

=== Out ===
Exit date	Position	No.	Player	To club	Fee
Nov 2014	GK		(Malaysia) Mohd Amirul Asraf Mohd Noor	(Malaysia) Felcra F.C.	
Nov 2014	GK		(Malaysia) Azizon Abdul Kadir	(Malaysia) Perak FA	
Nov 2014	GK		(Malaysia) Mohd Helmi Eliza Elias	(Malaysia) Negeri Sembilan FA	
Nov 2014	DC		(Brazil) Rafael Souza Silva Novais	Released	
Nov 2014	DRL/DMC		(Malaysia) Mohd Sabre Mat Abu	(Malaysia) Kedah FA	
Nov 2014	DR		(Malaysia) Zain Azraai Sulaiman	(Malaysia) Selangor FA	
Nov 2014	DC		(Malaysia) Abdul Halim Harun	(Malaysia) MOF F.C.	
Nov 2014	MC		(Malaysia) Azi Shahril Azmi	(Malaysia) Perlis FA	
Nov 2014	AMR		(Malaysia) Mohd Hazuan Mohd Daud	(Malaysia) Kuantan FA	
Nov 2014	AMR		(Malaysia) Mohd Shahril Izwan Abdullah	(Malaysia) Released	
Nov 2014	MRL/AMRL		(Malaysia) Muhd Fakhri Mohd Zain	(Malaysia) Kedah FA	
Nov 2014	MC		(Malaysia) Muhd Asraf Roslan	(Malaysia) NS Matrix F.C.	
Nov 2014	MC		(Malaysia) Wan Zaman Wan Mustapha	(Malaysia) MOF F.C.	
Nov 2014	AMLC		(Malaysia) Munir Amran	(Malaysia) PKNS F.C.	
Nov 2014	MC		(Malaysia) Mohd Fazilidin Khalid	(Malaysia) Kuala Lumpur FA	
Nov 2014	ST		(Brazil) Charles Chad Souza	(Malaysia) Perak FA	
Nov 2014	AMC/ST		(Malaysia) Bobby Gonzales	(Malaysia) Perak FA	
Nov 2014	ST		(Malaysia) Mohd Saufi Ibrahim	(Malaysia) Kuala Lumpur FA	
Nov 2014	ST		(Malaysia) Muhd Amirul Izwan Mohd Baki	(Malaysia) Perak FA	
26 Apr 2015	DC	21	(Nigeria) Onorionde Kughegbe	Released	
