= 2010 Malaysia FAM League =

Malaysia FAM League
- Season: 2010
- Champions: Sime Darby FC
- Promoted: Sime Darby FC; Sinar Dimaja Mai Sarah FC

2010 FAM League is the 58th edition season of current third-tier league competition in Malaysia. The league is called TM Malaysia FAM League for sponsorship reason.

The league winner for 2010 season is Sime Darby FC.

== Teams ==
The following teams participated in the 2010 TM Malaysia FAM League. In order by the number given by FAM:-

- 1 (Penang) Sinar Dimaja Mai Sarah FC
- 2 (Perlis) KSK Tambun Tulang FC
- 3 (Kuala Lumpur) Sime Darby FC
- 4 (Selangor) Juara Ban Hoe Leong FC
- 5 UiTM Pahang FC
- 6 (Kuala Lumpur) KL SPA FC
- 7 (Johor) Melodi Jaya Sports Club
- 8 MB Johor Bahru

== Season changes ==
The following teams have changed division since the 2009 season.

=== To Malaysia FAM League ===
Relegated from 2009 Malaysia Premier League

- (Penang) Sinar Dimaja Mai Sarah FC
- MB Johor Bahru

=== From Malaysia FAM League ===
Promoted to 2010 Malaysia Premier League

- (Kuala Lumpur) Pos Malaysia
- (Penang) Universiti Sains Malaysia Staff
- (Johor) Majlis Perbandaran Muar

Teams withdrawn

- Penjara F.C.

== League table ==
Pos	Team	Pld	W	D	L	GF	GA	GD	Pts	Qualification or relegation
1	Sime Darby	14	11	3	0	36	3	+33	36	Promoted to 2011 Malaysia Premier League.
2	SDMS Kepala Batas	14	9	3	2	41	15	+26	30	Promoted to 2011 Malaysia Premier League.
3	KL SPA	14	9	3	2	28	14	+14	30	
4	UiTM Pahang	14	6	2	6	29	17	+12	20	
5	MB Johor Bahru	14	4	1	9	15	22	−7	13	
6	KSK Tambun Tulang	14	3	4	7	18	31	−13	13	Withdrew from 2011 Malaysia FAM League.
7	Melodi Jaya Sports Club	13	2	4	7	13	28	−15	10	
8	Juara Ban Huo Leong Sports Club	14	1	1	12	13	45	−32	4	Withdrew from 2011 Malaysia FAM League.

Source: Rec.Sport.Soccer Statistics Foundation
Rules for classification: 1) Points; 2) Goal difference; 3) Number of goals scored.
