= 2011 Malaysia Premier League =

Liga Premier
- Season: 2011
- Champions: PKNS; 1st title
- Promoted: PKNS, Sarawak
- Relegated: SDMS Kepala Batas, Penang
- Matches played: 132
- Goals scored: 370 (2.8 per match)
- Top goalscorer: Mohd Fitri Omar (19 goals, MP Muar)
- Biggest home win: PKNS 7–0 Pos Malaysia (18 April 2011)
- Biggest away win: SDMS Kepala Batas 0–6 Harimau Muda B (25 April 2011)
- Highest scoring: PDRM 5–3 Johor (25 February 2011)

The 2011 Liga Premier (English: 2011 Premier League) was the eighth season of the Liga Premier, the second-tier professional football league in Malaysia.

The season was held from 31 January and concluded on 29 July 2011.

PKNS clinched the 2011 Liga Premier title on 20 May 2011, and first promotion spot to Liga Super, with a 2–0 win over Johor. The win gave them a 12-point unassailable lead over their nearest challenger, Sarawak with 3 games remaining. Sarawak themselves secured the second promotion spot after the 4–1 win over USM on 23 May 2011, gaining an 8-point unassailable difference over nearest rivals Sime Darby with 2 games remaining.

At the other end of the table, 2 Penang teams SDMS Kepala Batas and Penang confirms their status as two last-placed teams in Liga Premier, which relegates them to 2012 Liga FAM competition, subject to confirmation from FAM.

The Liga Premier champions for 2011 season was PKNS. The champions and runners-up were both promoted to 2012 Liga Super.

== Teams ==
A total of twelve teams will contest the league, including eight sides from the 2010 Liga Premier season, two newly promoted teams from 2010 Liga FAM and two relegated teams from the 2010 Liga Super season.

Malacca and Shahzan Muda were relegated from 2010 Liga Premier after finishing the season in the bottom two places of the league table.

2010 Liga FAM champions Sime Darby and runners-up SDMS Kepala Batas secured direct promotion to the Liga Premier.

Locations of the 2011 Liga Premier teams

=== Team summaries ===
==== Stadia ====
Team	Location	Stadium	Stadium capacity^{1}
ATM	Selangor	Majlis Perbandaran Selayang Stadium	25,000
Johor	Johor	Tan Sri Dato Hj Hassan Yunos Stadium	30,000
Harimau Muda B	Selangor	Majlis Perbandaran Selayang Stadium	25,000
Sime Darby	Selangor	Petaling Jaya Stadium	25,000
MP Muar	Johor	Pasir Gudang Corporation Stadium	15,000
PDRM	Negeri Sembilan	Tuanku Abdul Rahman Stadium	30,000
PKNS	Selangor	Petaling Jaya Stadium	25,000
Pos Malaysia	Selangor	Majlis Perbandaran Selayang Stadium	25,000
Penang	Penang	Negeri Pulau Pinang Stadium	40,000
Sarawak	Sarawak	Sarawak Stadium; Sarawak State Stadium^{2}	40,000; 26,000
SDMS Kepala Batas	Penang	Negeri Pulau Pinang Stadium	40,000
USM	Penang	USM Athletics Stadium	800^{+}

- ^{1} Correct as of end of 2010 Liga Premier season
- ^{2} Sarawak uses the Sarawak State Stadium beginning 14 Feb 2011 due to Sarawak Stadium being renovated for the upcoming Sukma Games in Sarawak.
- ^{+} 800 for covered terrace and unknown number for 'open' hill slope

==== Personnel and kits ====
Note: Flags indicate national team as has been defined under FIFA eligibility rules. Players and Managers may hold more than one non-FIFA nationality.

Team	Coach	Captain	Kit manufacturer	Shirt sponsor
ATM	(Malaysia) Zahid Hashim	(Malaysia) Fatrurazi Rozi	Kappa	
Johor	(Malaysia) Azmi Mohamed	(Malaysia) Mohd Affandy Adimel	Joma	Kulim Berhad
Harimau Muda B	(Malaysia) Ismail Ibrahim	(Malaysia) Mohd Syafiq Shalihin Mohd Noor	Nike	
Sime Darby	(Malaysia) Ismail Zakaria	(Malaysia) Mohd Nor Ismail		Sime Darby
MP Muar	(Malaysia) Jacob Joseph	(Malaysia) Zainurin Abdul Kadir	Kronos	Interpacific
PDRM	(Malaysia) K. Thaiyanathan	(Malaysia) Mohd Saiful Rusly		
PKNS	(Malaysia) Abdul Rahman Ibrahim	(Malaysia) Mohd Fadhil Mohd Hashim	Kappa	PKNS
Pos Malaysia	(Malaysia) Mat Zan Mat Aris	(Malaysia) Manopsak Kram	Kika	Pos Malaysia
Penang	(Malaysia) Ahmad Yusof	(Malaysia) Megat Amir Faisal Al Khalidi Ibrahim	Eutag	
Sarawak	(Netherlands) Robert Alberts	(Malaysia) Zamri Morshidi	StarSport	Naim Homes
SDMS Kepala Batas	(Malaysia) Mohammad Adam Abdullah	(Malaysia) Shahrulnizam Mohd		
USM	(Malaysia) S. Veloo	(Malaysia) Mohd Fariss Azlan Mat Isa	Joma	USM & Asmana

- According to current revision of List of Malaysian Liga Premier managers

Nike has produced a new match ball, named the T90 Tracer, which will be electric blue, black and white and also a high-visibility version in yellow. Additionally, Lotto will provide officials with new kits in black, yellow, and red for the season.

== League table ==
Pos	Team	Pld	W	D	L	GF	GA	GD	Pts	Qualification or relegation
1	PKNS	22	18	3	1	51	7	+44	57	Promoted to Malaysia Super League
2	Sarawak	22	15	3	4	51	16	+35	48	Promoted to Malaysia Super League
3	PDRM	22	12	3	7	36	28	+8	39	
4	Johor	22	11	3	8	37	25	+12	36	
5	Sime Darby	22	10	5	7	22	12	+10	35	
6	USM	22	11	2	9	32	30	+2	35	
7	ATM	22	9	7	6	26	22	+4	34	
8	MP Muar	22	8	4	10	29	42	−13	28	
9	Pos Malaysia	22	7	6	9	26	36	−10	27	
10	Harimau Muda B	22	5	5	12	24	28	−4	20	
11	SDMS Kepala Batas	22	3	2	17	22	63	−41	11	Relegated to Malaysia FAM League
12	Penang	22	1	1	20	14	61	−47	4	Relegated to Malaysia FAM League

Source: Rec.Sport.Soccer Statistics Foundation
Rules for classification: 1) Points; 2) Goal difference; 3) Number of goals scored.

== Results ==
Home \ Away	ATM	JHR	HMB	SDA	MUAR	PDRM	PKN	POS	PEN	SWK	SDMS	USM
ATM		2–1	1–0	0–3	3–0	0–1	2–4	1–1	1–0	0–1	2–1	2–1
JHR	0–0		3–0	1–0	2–0	2–2	1–2	1–1	4–0	2–0	3–0	1–2
Harimau Muda B	0–2	0–2		0–1	2–2	1–2	0–0	2–1	3–1	1–2	2–1	2–0
Sime Darby	1–0	0–1	0–0		1–0	0–0	0–1	0–0	3–0	1–1	2–0	0–0
MUAR	3–2	1–0	1–0	0–1		1–3	0–2	2–2	3–2	2–0	1–1	2–1
PDRM	1–1	5–3	2–1	1–0	2–0		1–5	1–2	5–0	0–4	3–0	0–2
PKNS	0–0	2–0	2–1	1–0	4–0	1–0		7–0	1–0	2–0	6–0	4–0
POS	1–3	1–2	1–0	0–3	1–1	0–3	0–0		4–0	1–5	2–1	1–0
Penang	1–2	1–2	0–0	2–3	1–4	0–2	0–1	0–1		0–4	4–2	2–5
SWK	1–1	2–0	3–3	0–2	6–0	3–0	1–0	1–0	5–0		3–0	4–1
SDMS	0–0	2–5	0–6	2–1	4–3	1–2	1–5	0–5	3–0	0–3		2–3
USM	1–1	2–1	1–0	2–0	2–3	1–0	0–1	3–0	3–0	0–2	2–1	

Updated to match(es) played on 24 May 2011. Source: Liga Premier
Legend: Blue = home team win; Yellow = draw; Red = away team win.

== Top scorers ==
Up to matches played on 1 July 2011.

Rank	Scorer	Club	Goal
1	(Malaysia) Mohd Fitri Omar	MP MUAR	19
2	(Malaysia) Bobby Gonzales	SWK	16
3	(Malaysia) Norizam Salaman	JHR	13
4	(Malaysia) Mohammad Khairul Akhyar Husain	PKNS	11
4	(Malaysia) Mohd Failee Mohamad Ghazli	USM	11
4	(Malaysia) Khairul Izuan Abdullah	PDRM	11
7	(Malaysia) Fazuan Abdullah	PDRM	9
7	(Malaysia) Zamri Morshidi	SWK	9
7	(Malaysia) Muhammad Zamri Hassan @ Manap	PKNS	9
7	(Malaysia) Mohd Azrif Nasrulhaq Badrul	PKNS	9
11	(Malaysia) Ashri Chuchu	SWK	8
11	(Malaysia) Irme Mat	PKNS	8
11	(Malaysia) Muhammad Afzan Zainal Abidin	USM	8
11	(Malaysia) V. Jaganathan	ATM	8
11	(Malaysia) G. Puaneswaran	POS	8
11	(Malaysia) Mohd Shoufiq Mohamad Khushaini	JHR	8
