= Christie Jayaseelan =

Malaysian footballer

Personal information
- Full name: Christie Jayaseelan a/l Devasagayam
- Date of birth: 18 August 1986 (age 40)
- Place of birth: Kajang, Malaysia
- Height: 1.69 m (5 ft 6 1/2 in)
- Positions: Midfielder; winger

Team information
- Current team: Sarawak United
- Number: 19

Youth career
- 2005–2006: PKNS U-21

Senior career*
Years	Team	Apps	(Gls)
2007–2011	PKNS	20	(10)
2012–2015	ATM		
2015–2016	Felda United	17	(3)
2017	Pahang	9	(3)
2018–2019	Felda United	36	(6)
2020	Petaling Jaya City	6	(1)
2021–2022	Sarawak United	22	(3)

International career
2012–2016	Malaysia	9	(2)
- * Club domestic league appearances and goals

Christie Jayaseelan Devasagayam (born 18 August 1986) is a Malaysian footballer who last plays for Sarawak United in the Malaysia Premier League.

== Club career ==
Christie started his career in football with PKNS FC football academy in 2005. Then, he was promoted to the senior squad and played with the club for five seasons. In 2011 Malaysia Premier League season, he helps his team becomes the champion and promoted to the Malaysia Super League for 2012 season.

However, he joins ATM FA alongside national team players Mohd Aidil Zafuan Abdul Radzak and Mohd Azmi Muslim which competed in the 2012 Malaysia Premier League season.

Christie joined Sarawak United FC for the 2021 Malaysia Premier League. He scored on his debut against Kelantan United on 7 March 2021.

== International career ==
Christie had made his debut for his country in a friendly match against Barcelona and Vietnam. On 8 October 2015, Christie scored two goals against Laos.

== Career statistics ==
=== International ===
Appearances and goals by national team and year
National team	Year	Apps	Goals
Malaysia	2012	1	0
Malaysia	2013	–	
Malaysia	2014	–	
Malaysia	2015	3	2
Malaysia	2016	5	0
Total		9	2

Scores and results list Malaysia's goal tally first, score column indicates score after each Jayaseelan goal.

List of international goals scored by Christie Jayaseelan
No.	Date	Venue	Opponent	Score	Result	Competition
1	8 October 2015	Royal Thai Army Stadium, Bangkok, Thailand	Laos	1–0	3–1	Friendly
2	8 October 2015	Royal Thai Army Stadium, Bangkok, Thailand	Laos	3–1	3–1	Friendly
