= Munir Amran =

Malaysian footballer

Personal information
- Full name: Mohammad Munir bin Amran
- Date of birth: 7 November 1983 (age 43)
- Place of birth: Pontian, Johor, Malaysia
- Height: 1.85 m (6 ft 1 in)
- Position: Midfielder

Senior career*
Years	Team	Apps	(Gls)
2004–2006	Melaka TMFC	?	(4)
2007–2008	Sabah	?	(0)
2009–2010	Felda United	?	(4)
2011	Pahang	22	(0)
2011	→ Negeri Sembilan (loan)	?	(0)
2012	Johor	?	(2)
2013	Kuala Lumpur	22	(3)
2014–2015	PDRM	11	(2)
2016–2017	PKNS	16	(1)

International career^{‡}
2005	Malaysia U-23	2	(0)
- * Club domestic league appearances and goals as of January 24, 2017 ‡ National team caps and goals as of January 24, 2017

Mohammad Munir Bin Amran (born 7 November 1983) is a former football player who plays as a midfielder.

== Career ==
Munir started his career with Melaka TMFC in 2004. From 2007 to 2008, Munir played for Sabah FA. In 2009, Munir was signed by Felda United, and was instrumental in the club's successful promotion to Malaysia Super League by winning the 2010 Malaysia Premier League, but in 2011 he was transferred to Pahang FA. Munir is known as a professional free-kick taker from the team.

During the 2011 Malaysia Cup campaign, it was announced that Munir Amran would play with Negeri Sembilan FA on loan. This was the result of disqualification of Pahang FA from the campaign after losing to Sime Darby FC during the play-off game. In the 2013 season Munir changed clubs again, this time playing for Kuala Lumpur FA.

For the 2014 season, Munir was signed by PDRM FA, along with his Kuala Lumpur teammate Azizon Abdul Kadir.

== International ==
Munir represent Malaysia national under 23 team in 2005. He played against Japan U-20 at the Agribank Cup in Vietnam. He won 2005 Southeast Asian Games bronze medal with the team. He played in the semi final against Vietnam which Malaysia lost 2–1.
