= Dalibor Dragić =

Bosnian footballer

Personal information
- Full name: Dalibor Dragić
- Date of birth: 23 June 1972 (age 54)
- Place of birth: Prijedor, SR Bosnia and Herzegovina, SFR Yugoslavia
- Height: 1.85 m (6 ft 1 in)
- Position: Defender

Senior career*
Years	Team	Apps	(Gls)
1993–1994	Borac Banja Luka		
1994–1999	Vojvodina	87	(2)
1995–1996	→ Borac Čačak (loan)	21	(0)
1999–2002	Levski Sofia	50	(7)
2003	Cherno More Varna	11	(1)
2003–2004	SV Mattersburg	34	(2)
2004–2005	Marek Dupnitsa	18	(1)
2005	Turan Tovuz	12	(0)
2006	Olimpik Baku	11	(0)
2007	Mladost Apatin	12	(1)
2007–2008	Sabah FA		
2009–2010	Proleter Novi Sad	29	(0)
2010–2011	Rudar Prijedor	35	(0)
2012	MB Johor Bahru		
Total		320+	(14+)
- * Club domestic league appearances and goals

Dalibor Dragić (Serbian Cyrillic: Далибор Драгић; born 23 June 1972) is a Bosnian former professional footballer who played as a defender.

== Career ==
In 1994, Dragić was acquired by Vojvodina. He spent the next five years in Novi Sad, including a loan spell with Borac Čačak in 1995–96.

In late 1999, Dragić moved to Bulgaria to join Levski Sofia. He spent three years with the club, winning three consecutive championships (2000, 2001, and 2002) and two national cups (2000 and 2002). In the 2003 winter transfer window, Dragić switched to fellow Bulgarian side Cherno More Varna.

After a brief stint at Mladost Apatin, Dragić signed with Malaysian side Sabah FA in July 2007, helping the team to a fourth-place finish in the 2007–08 Malaysia Premier League.

In 2010, Dragić joined his hometown club Rudar Prijedor. He returned to Malaysia in early 2012 to play for MB Johor Bahru at nearly 40 years of age.

== Career statistics ==
Club	Season	League	
Club	Season	Apps	Goals
Vojvodina	1994–95	18	0
Vojvodina	1995–96	0	0
Vojvodina	1996–97	19	0
Vojvodina	1997–98	24	2
Vojvodina	1998–99	17	0
Vojvodina	1999–2000	9	0
Vojvodina	Total	87	2
