= Eduard Sakhnevich =

Russian footballer

Personal information
- Full name: Eduard Viktorovich Sakhnevich
- Date of birth: 2 September 1980 (age 46)
- Place of birth: Vladivostok, Soviet Union
- Height: 1.80 m (5 ft 11 in)
- Position: Forward

Senior career*
| Years | Team | Apps | (Gls) |
| 2000 | FC Luch Vladivostok | 1 | (0) |
| 2003 | Cảng Sài Gòn | | |
| 2006–2007 | FC Mostovik | | |
| 2008 | FC Lukhovitsy | 13 | (0) |
| 2009 | FC Luch-Energiya Vladivostok | 21 | (1) |
| 2010 | Becamex Binh Duong F.C. | - | (-) |
| 2011 | Sheikh Russel KC | 22 | (10) |
| 2012 | Pahang FA | 6 | (4) |
- * Club domestic league appearances and goals

Eduard Viktorovich Sakhnevich (Russian: Эдуард Викторович Сахневич; born 2 September 1980) is a former Russian footballer.

== Career ==
Before joining Pahang, he played in his native Russia with FC Luch-Energiya Vladivostok (in the Russian Football National League) and FC Lukhovitsy, in Vietnam with Becamex Binh Duong F.C. and in Bangladesh with Sheikh Russel KC.

On 10 February 2012 Sakhnevich joined Malaysia Premier League outfit Pahang, which has another Russian in their books Boris Kochkin. He replaced Nana Yaw Agyei. However, his contract was terminated by Pahang on 10 April due to performance issues, although Sakhnevich had contributed four goals in his six appearances with the Elephants.
