= Leandro Teófilo =

Brazilian footballer

Personal information
- Date of birth: May 3, 1981 (age 45)
- Place of birth: Rio de Janeiro, Brazil
- Height: 1.75 m (5 ft 9 in)
- Position: Midfielder

Senior career*
Years	Team	Apps	(Gls)
2002	Östersund	?	(?)
2005	Juventus (SP)	?	(?)
2005	→ Đà Nẵng (loan)	8	(0)
2006	Matsubara	?	(?)
2006	Guanabara	?	(?)
2006	→ Moto Club (loan)	3	(0)
2007	Matsubara	?	(?)
2007	→ Hòa Phát (loan)	?	(?)
2008–2009	Gandzasar	35	(2)
2009–2010	Vllaznia	9	(0)
2011	America RJ	4	(0)
2011–2012	Gandzasar	9	(0)
2012	Sime Darby F.C.	4	(1)
2017	IFK Åmål		
- * Club domestic league appearances and goals

Leandro Teófilo Santos Pinto (born May 3, 1981) is a Brazilian football player who plays as a midfielder.

He was recently playing for Malaysia Premier League club Sime Darby F.C., which he joined in April 2012. He was released at the end of the season.

Before joining Sime Darby, he played for Armenian club Gandzasar F.C. He also has played for clubs in Vietnam, Sweden, Albania as well as his native Brazil. Now he plays in Sweden for the division three club IFK Åmål in Dalsland, Västra Götaland.
