= Syamim Alif Sobri =

Malaysian footballer

Mohd Syamim Alif
Personal information
- Full name: Mohd Syamim Alif bin Sobri
- Date of birth: 5 August 1993 (age 33)
- Place of birth: Kedah, Malaysia
- Height: 1.76 m (5 ft 9 1/2 in)
- Position: Striker

Team information
- Current team: Selangor United
- Number: 18

Youth career
- 2009–2010: Bukit Jalil Sports School

Senior career*
Years	Team	Apps	(Gls)
2011	Harimau Muda B	9	(1)
2012–2014	Kedah	16	(6)
2015	Kedah United	10	(4)
2016	Sungai Ara	14	(2)
2017–	Selangor United	30	(11)

International career^{‡}
2009–2010	Malaysia U-17		
2010–2011	Malaysia U-19		
- * Club domestic league appearances and goals as of 9 January 2019 ‡ National team caps and goals as of 9 May 2014

Mohd "Syamim Alif" bin Sobri (born August 5, 1993) in Kulim, Kedah, is a Malaysian footballer. In 2019 he played for Selangor United in Malaysia Premier League.

== Early life ==
Syamim attended the Bukit Jalil Sports School youth academy. He played for Harimau Muda B in Malaysia Premier League from 2010-2011.

== Club career ==
At the end of 2012 Malaysia Super League season, he is given the chance to play due to loss of some key players. On 17 July 2012, he scored the only and his first ever goal for Kedah FA against Sabah FA in the 2013 Malaysia Super League/Malaysia Premier League Play-off round that ensure Kedah FA a spot in the final.

In 2015, Mohd Syamim Alif played with Kedah United F.C. in 2015 Malaysia FAM League.

In 2016, Mohd Syamim alif played with Penang Sg Ara fc in Malaysia FAM League.

In 2017, Mohd Syamim Alif moved to Pbms(selangor united fc) and help them to promoted in Malaysia Premier league 2019. With 23 appearances and score 11 goal.2nd in Malaysia Fam cup 2018 after defeated by Terengganu City Fc in finals.
