= Abdulfatah Safi =

French footballer of Moroccan origin (born 1981)

Abdelfatah Safi
Personal information
- Full name: Abdelfatah Aftha Safi
- Date of birth: May 23, 1981 (age 45)
- Place of birth: Meaux, France
- Height: 1.85 m (6 ft 1 in)
- Position: Midfielder

Senior career*
Years	Team	Apps	(Gls)
2002–2004	Poissy	21	(2)
2004–2005	Pacy-sur-Eure	25	(3)
2005–2007	Entente SSG	42	(6)
2007–2009	Najran	32	(9)
2009–2010	Al-Salmiya	28	(8)
2010–2011	Busaiteen	36	(10)
2012	Kedah FA	23	(6)
2013	Sabah FA	14	(5)
- * Club domestic league appearances and goals as of April 24, 2013

Abdelfatah Aftha Safi (born May 23, 1981) is a French footballer of Moroccan origin who is currently playing for Sabah FA in the 2013 Malaysia Premier League.

Abdulfatah was born in Meaux, a small commune in the Seine-et-Marne department in the Île-de-France region to Moroccan parents. Abdulfatah started his career with AS Poissy at the age of 20.

As an attacking midfielder, Abdelfatah Safi had played for several clubs in different countries such as AS Poissy in France, Najran in Saudi Arabia, Al-Salmiya SC in Kuwait and Al-Najma in Bahrain.

After a successful trial, Safi joined Kedah FA, a team playing in the Malaysia Super League, in 2012. He was not retained by Kedah for the 2013 season, but joined another Malaysian team, Sabah FA in 2013.
