= B. Sathianathan =

Malaysian football coach (1958–2023)

Sathianathan s/o R. Bhaskran (9 May 1958 – 18 July 2023), also known as Coach Sathia, was a Malaysian football coach and player. His final coaching role was with Sarawak United in the Malaysia Super League, having previously coached the Malaysia and the under-23 team.

== Playing career ==
As a player and attacking midfielder, he had played with NSCRC (Negeri Sembilan Chinese Recreation Club), Negeri Sembilan FA and Malacca FA. He also was part of the Malaysia squad that won bronze medal at the 1983 Sea Games. In 1988, he became Negeri Sembilan skipper at centre-back.

== Coaching career ==
Early in his career in coaching, Sathianathan coached Negeri Sembilan FA. He held the assistant coach position for the national Olympic team between 1997 and 1999 and between 2002 and 2004. He was also the assistant head coach at MPPJ FC in 2006 until the dissolution of the club and acting as the interim head coach for a short period after Michael Feichtenbeiner was relieved of his job.

In 2006, he was selected by the Football Association of Malaysia to be the head coach for the Malaysia under-23 side in preparation for the 2008 Summer Olympics qualifiers. After winning the 2007 Merdeka Tournament, he was selected as the head coach for the senior team by FAM president Sultan Haji Ahmad Shah.

His first match as the team's head coach was in the 2010 FIFA World Cup qualifiers against Bahrain. In the match, Malaysia lost 4–1 before drawing 0–0 at Shah Alam. After the World Cup 2010 qualifying campaign ended, he then brought the under-23 side to the 2007 SEA Games in Thailand, without any success after only managing one win, one draw and one defeat and for the first time since 1999, Malaysia failed to advance into the semi-finals.

For 2008, Sathianathan brought the Malaysia XI to face Premier League club Chelsea. Eventually, the match was won 2–0 by Chelsea and the squads did well in the match as Chelsea head coach Luiz Felipe Scolari praised the Malaysian team.

In the 2008 Merdeka Tournament, Sathianathan again brought Malaysia into the final. Malaysia showed impressive performances from the start of the tournament and did not concede in all of their matches. However Sathianathan's side lost 6–5 in a penalty shoot-out against Vietnam in the final.

In 2008 AFF Suzuki Cup, the Malaysian team started well with a convincing win over Laos. However, in the last two matches, his team lost 3–2 to Vietnam and beaten by host Thailand 3–0. The loss against the Thais saw Malaysia exit the competition from the group stage for the first time since 1998. Rumours also spread that he will be replaced by Indonesia's former coach, Peter Withe because of his failures. However, the FAM decided to extend his contract for one more year with a condition that he must improve Malaysia's FIFA ranking.

In February 2009, Sathianathan's one-year contract was terminated by the FAM, after Malaysia was thrashed 5–0 by United Arab Emirates in a 2011 AFC Asian Cup qualification match. Subsequently, he coached Kelantan FA from November 2009 and guided the team to win the 2010 Malaysia Cup. He was forced to leave his post after being handed a 6-month coaching ban by FAM from January 2011 for criticising the national football body and later became the CEO of Kelantan FA.

Sathianathan was appointed the coach of ATM FA in November 2011. Under Sathianathan's leadership, ATM won the 2012 Malaysia Premier League, and an automatic promotion to the 2013 Malaysia Super League. Sathianathan succeeded in maintaining ATM as a Super League team for three seasons and also a finalist of the 2013 Malaysia Cup, until he was relieved of his duties in April 2015.

Sathianathan was announced as the new Felda United F.C. head coach in February 2017. Under his helm, Felda secured 3rd place in the 2017 Malaysia Super League and reached the semi-finals of the 2017 Malaysia Cup. He won the Super League's Best Coach award in that season. Even though Felda was relegated for failing to acquire a Super League license for the next season, Sathianathan succeeded in guiding the team to win the 2018 Malaysia Premier League and promotion back to Super League at the first attempt. After Felda's 2018 Malaysia Cup journey ended in the quarter-finals and a restructuring of the club management, Sathianathan announced that he will not continue coaching the team after the end of his contract that year.

On 22 November 2018, Sathianathan was announced as Selangor FA's new head coach. The announcement was made official the next day, in a live session with Sathianathan via Selangor's official Facebook page.

On 21 September 2020, Sathianathan was sacked by Selangor due to a string of poor results after the Malaysian Super League resumed.

== Personal life and views ==
Regarding the continuation of playing in the Malaysia Football League throughout the Ramadan fasting period, he mentioned that "Football leagues in Arabian countries (where the Muslim population is greater than Malaysia) also don’t stop during Ramadan. In fact, the festivities and spirit are felt on the pitch too", as reported by Fox Sports Asia in an article.

B. Sathianathan died of cancer on 18 July 2023, at the age of 65.

B.Satiananthan is survived by his beloved wife, Krishna Priya Satiananthan, who stood by his side throughout his journey.

B Satiananthan left behind his legacy through his kids, Sheena Satiananthan, Shervina Satiananthan, Visnu Satiananthan and Dorshen Satiananthan.

== Honours ==
Negeri Sembilan

- Sultan's Gold Cup: 1992

Malaysia U23

- Merdeka Tournament: 2007; runner-up 2008

Kelantan FA

- Malaysia Cup: 2010

ATM FA

- Malaysia Premier League: 2012

Felda United FC

- Malaysia Premier League: 2018

Individual

- National Football Award Best Coach: 2010, 2012, 2017
