= Hillary Echesa =

Kenyan footballer (born 1981)

Personal information
- Full name: Hillary Odada Echesa
- Date of birth: 9 September 1981 (age 45)
- Place of birth: Nakuru, Kenya
- Height: 5 ft 9 in (1.75 m)
- Position: Midfielder

Team information
- Current team: Chemelil Sugar

Senior career*
Years	Team	Apps	(Gls)
2001–2003	Nzoia Sugar		
2003–2005	Ulinzi Stars		
2005–2006	Mumias Sugar		
2006	Young Africans		
2006	Rayon Sport		
2006–2008	PDRM FA		
2008–2009	Deltras		
2010	Simba		
2011	Tusker		
2012	MP Muar		
2013	NS Betaria F.C.		
2013	Sofapaka		
2014–	Chemelil Sugar		

International career
1997	Kenya U-17		
2000–2003	Kenya U-23		
2001–2009	Kenya	31	(6)
- * Club domestic league appearances and goals

Hillary "Fordy" Echesa (born 9 September 1981 in Kenya) is a Kenyan international footballer, currently playing for Chemelil Sugar in the Tusker Premier League.
