= Venice Elphi =

Malaysian footballer

Personal information
- Full name: Venice Elphi anak Danny Kaya
- Date of birth: 10 September 1984 (age 42)
- Place of birth: Kuching, Sarawak, Malaysia
- Height: 1.70 m (5 ft 7 in)
- Position: Winger

Team information
- Current team: ATM
- Number: 10

Senior career*
Years	Team	Apps	(Gls)
2008–2023	ATM FA	164	(34)
- * Club domestic league appearances and goals as of 19 October 2019

Venice Elphi anak Danny Kaya (born 10 September 1984) is a Malaysian footballer plays for Angkatan Tentera Malaysia F.A in Malaysia M3 League. Venice plays as a winger. As of 2022, he is the longest serving player in the current ATM FA squad.

== Club career ==
=== ATM FA ===
Venice football career started when his talent was spotted in 2007, two years after he joined the Malaysian Armed Forces in 2005. He was selected in the armed forces football team starting in 2008, when ATM FA was in the second-tier Malaysia Premier League. Venice turned full-time professional with ATM FA in 2011, having played before that as a semi-professional player, combining soccer with his army duties.

Venice has won the 2012 Malaysia Premier League with ATM FA, and were in the team that finished runners-up to Kelantan FA in the 2012 Malaysia Cup final, the first time ATM FA qualified for the Malaysia Cup final since 1966.

== International career ==
Venice received his first call-up to the Malaysia national football team in early 2012 under K. Rajagopal.

== Personal ==
Venice was a Corporal in the Malaysian Armed Forces, before being promoted to Sergeant in 2012. He is of Iban-Bidayuh native. On 30 April 2018, he were promoted to Staff Sergeant.

Venice lost his first daughter, 6, in July 2018 in an accidental fall from the family's apartment.
