= Alafi Mahmud =

Malaysian footballer

Personal information
- Full name: Mohd Alafi bin Mahmud
- Date of birth: 29 April 1985 (age 41)
- Place of birth: Klang, Malaysia
- Height: 1.71 m (5 ft 7 1/2 in)
- Positions: Forward; winger; midfielder

Team information
- Current team: Imigresen
- Number: 9

Senior career*
Years	Team	Apps	(Gls)
2011–2012	Pahang	8	(1)
2012–2013	Muar	9	(7)
2012–2013	Negeri Sembilan	14	(0)
2014–2015	PDRM	12	(1)
2016–2017	Perlis	29	(5)
2018	Penang	11	(1)
2019	Puchong Fuerza		
2020–	Imigresen		
- * Club domestic league appearances and goals as of 23 March 2020

Mohd Alafi bin Mahmud (born 29 April 1985) is a Malaysian professional footballer who plays for Malaysia M3 League side Imigresen.

== Career statistics ==
=== Club ===
As of 27 July 2018

Club	Season	League		Cup		League Cup		Continental		Total	
Club	Season	Apps	Goals	Apps	Goals	Apps	Goals	Apps	Goals	Apps	Goals
Perlis	2016	13	3	2	0	0	0	–	–	15	3
Perlis	2017	16	2	2	0	0	0	–	–	18	2
Perlis	Total	29	5	4	0	0	0	0	0	33	5
Penang	2018	11	1	2	0	0	0	–	–	13	1
Penang	Total	0	0	0	0	0	0	0	0	0	0
Career total		0	0	0	0	0	0	0	0	0	0

== Honours ==
=== Club ===
PDRM

- Malaysia Premier League: 2014
