= 2010 Malaysia Premier League =

Malaysian second-tier football league

Liga Premier
- Season: 2010
- Champions: Felda United; 1st title
- Relegated: Malacca; Shahzan Muda
- Matches: 182
- Top goalscorer: 11 goals Mohammad Zamri Hassan (PKNS)

The 2010 Liga Premier, also known as the TM Liga Premier for sponsorship reasons, was the seventh season of the Liga Premier, the second-tier professional football league in Malaysia.

The season was held from 11 January and concluded on 23 July 2010.

During the 2010 season, Harimau Muda, which is the national feeder project team was split into two different team where Harimau Muda A went to a training camp in Zlaté Moravce, Slovakia for 8 months while Harimau Muda B competed as Harimau Muda in the remaining fixtures of 2010 Liga Premier season.

The Liga Premier champions for 2010 season was Felda United. The champions and runners-up were both promoted to 2011 Liga Super.

== Teams ==
Below are the list of clubs which compete in this season competition.

- ATM
- (Kuala Lumpur) Felda United
- (Malaysia) Harimau Muda
- Malacca
- (Johor) MP Muar¹
- PDRM²
- (Selangor) PKNS
- (Kuala Lumpur) Pos Malaysia¹
- Sabah
- Sarawak
- (Pahang) Shahzan Muda
- (Penang) USM¹

¹ - promoted from Liga FAM
² - relegated from Liga Super

=== Stadia ===
Team	Stadium	Capacity
ATM	Majlis Perbandaran Selayang Stadium, Selayang, Selangor	25,000
Felda United	KLFA Stadium, Kuala Lumpur	18,000
Harimau Muda	Hang Tuah Stadium, Malacca	15,000
Malacca	Hang Tuah Stadium, Malacca	15,000
MP Muar	Tan Sri Dato Hj Hassan Yunos Stadium, Johor Bahru, Johor	30,000
PDRM	Tuanku Abdul Rahman Stadium, Paroi, Seremban, Negeri Sembilan	30,000
PKNS	MBPJ Stadium, Kelana Jaya, Petaling Jaya, Selangor	25,000
Pos Malaysia	Majlis Perbandaran Selayang Stadium, Selayang, Selangor	25,000
Sabah	Likas Stadium, Kota Kinabalu, Sabah	30,000
Sarawak	Sarawak Stadium, Kuching, Sarawak	40,000
Shahzan Muda	Darulmakmur Stadium, Kuantan, Pahang	35,000
USM	USM Stadium, Penang	800

== League table ==
Pos	Team	Pld	W	D	L	GF	GA	GD	Pts	Promotion or relegation
1	Felda United	22	15	5	2	48	12	+36	50	Promotion to Super League
2	Sabah	22	15	3	4	42	14	+28	48	Promotion to Super League
3	PKNS	22	14	3	5	56	18	+38	45	
4	ATM	22	11	9	2	49	18	+31	42	
5	Harimau Muda	22	11	4	7	49	39	+10	37	
6	Sarawak	22	11	4	7	42	34	+8	37	
7	PDRM	22	8	4	10	37	41	−4	28	
8	Pos Malaysia	22	7	3	12	41	43	−2	24	
9	USM	22	6	5	11	28	40	−12	23	
10	MP Muar	22	5	3	14	19	68	−49	18	
11	Malacca	22	4	3	15	31	68	−37	15	Relegation to FAM League
12	Shahzan Muda	22	1	2	19	15	62	−47	5	Relegation to FAM League

Source: FAM Website, Results TM Premier League
Rules for classification: 1) Points; 2) Goal difference; 3) Number of goals scored

== Season statistics ==
=== Top goalscorers ===
Rank	Scorer	Club	Goals
1	(Malaysia) Mohammad Zamri Hassan	(Selangor) PKNS	11
2	(Malaysia) Fatrurazi Rozi	(Kuala Lumpur) Felda United	9
3	(Malaysia) D. Saarvindran	(Malaysia) Harimau Muda	8
4	(Malaysia) V. Saravanan	(Kuala Lumpur) ATM	7
5	(Malaysia) Zamri Morshidi	Sarawak	7
6	(Malaysia) G. Puaneswaran	(Kuala Lumpur) Pos Malaysia	5
7	(Malaysia) Ferris Danial	(Malaysia) Harimau Muda	3
8	(Malaysia) Khairul Izwan Khalid	(Kuala Lumpur) Felda United	3
9	(Malaysia) Muhammad Afzan Zainal Abidin	(Penang) USM	3
10	(Malaysia) K. Depan Sakwati	Malacca	3
