= Lamin Conteh =

Sierra Leonean footballer (1976–2022)

Lamin Conteh Jr.
Personal information
- Date of birth: 20 June 1976
- Place of birth: Freetown, Sierra Leone
- Date of death: 5 May 2022 (aged 45)
- Place of death: Kenema, Sierra Leone
- Height: 1.74 m (5 ft 9 in)
- Position: Attacking midfielder

Youth career
- 1990–1992: Old Edwardians

Senior career*
Years	Team	Apps	(Gls)
1992–1995	Beerschot VAC	48	(13)
1995–1997	SV Meppen	16	(2)
1997	Boavista	6	(1)
1997–1998	Varzim	14	(4)
1998–2002	Al Wahda		(28)
2002–2003	Fujairah Club		
2003–2006	Perlis F.A.		
2007	Pelita Jaya	27	(5)
2008	Negeri Sembilan FA		
2010	Chanthaburi F.C.		
2012	Perlis F.A.		

International career
1994–2002	Sierra Leone	18	(4)
- * Club domestic league appearances and goals

Lamin Conteh (20 June 1976 – 5 May 2022), widely known by his nickname Junior Tumbu, was a Sierra Leonean professional footballer who played as an attacking midfielder. He represented the Sierra Leone national team from 1994 until 2002.

== Biography ==
Conteh was born and raised in Freetown, Sierra Leone, to Muslim parents from the limba ethnic group. A Muslim himself, Conteh grew up in poverty. As a teenager, he was frequently seen playing street football across Freetown with boys much older than he was. As a teenager, he was considered the best secondary school footballer in Sierra Leone. He dropped out of the Ahmmadiyya Muslim Secondary School in Freetown in 1992 to become a professional footballer.

Conteh made his international debut for Sierra Leone in 1994, at the age of seventeen.

Though a Muslim, Lamin was highly involved in the Rastafari movement and was a big fan of reggae star Bob Marley.

Conteh died in the early hours of 5 May 2022.

== Career ==
At the age of 18, Conteh was selected to play for Sierra Leone in the 1994 Africa Cup of Nations held in Tunisia. He was also picked in the squad for the following tournament in South Africa two years later. After a match against Nigeria in 2000, Conteh claimed that the Sierra Leone Football Association owed him $2,000, and refused to play for his country until the money was paid to him. The matter was later resolved, and in 2002, he took over the captaincy of the national team from Mohamed Kallon.

== Honours ==
Al Wahda

- UAE Pro League: 1998–99, 2000–01
- UAE President's Cup: 1999–2000
- UAE Federation Cup: 2001

Perlis F.A.

- Malaysia Super League: 2005
- Malaysia Cup: 2004, 2006
