= Harimau Muda B =

- Full name: Harimau Muda B
- Nickname: The Young Tigers
- Founded: 2009
- Dissolved: 2015
- Ground: Pasir Gudang Corporation Stadium
- Capacity: 15,000
- Chairman: Tengku Abdullah ibni Sultan Ahmad Shah
- 2014: S.League, 12th
Home colours	Away colours

Harimau Muda B (The Young Tigers) was the Malaysia under-21 national football team managed by the Football Association of Malaysia. which took part in Malaysia Premier League from the 2007–08 season and also FA Cup Malaysia. In 2015, Harimau Muda once again became a single team composed of former Harimau Muda A & B players.

Harimau Muda B last competed in Singapore's 2014 S. League. The team was aimed at developing Malaysian youth players and does not recruit any foreign nationals in its squad. On 25 November 2015, it was confirmed that the Harimau Muda has disbanded.

== History ==
On 19 October 2007, the FAM decided to include Malaysia U-21 as one of the team in Malaysia Premier League 2007-08 known as Harimau Muda (Young Tigers). In July 2009, the Harimau Muda A was sent to Zibo, China to participate in the 2010 AFC U-19 Championship qualification, while Harimau Muda B participated in the Premier League and the Malaysia FA Cup. During the 2010 season, Harimau Muda A went to a training camp in Zlaté Moravce, Slovakia, while Harimau Muda B participated in the 2010 Malaysia Premier League.

In the 2011 season, Harimau Muda A joined the 2011 Super League Malaysia replacing KL PLUS FC, and Harimau Muda B continued to play in the league. Harimau Muda A finished 5th, while Harimau Muda B played their worst season being in the bottom 3. However, they managed to avoid relegation. For the 2012 season, Harimau Muda A swapped places with Singapore LIONSXII of Singapore. Harimau Muda B continued to participate in the 2012 Malaysia Premier League. Harimau Muda A did not enter the 2012 Singapore Cup to concentrate for 2013 AFC U-22 Asian Cup qualification. Harimau Muda B took their slot as a replacement.

In 2013, the Football Association of Malaysia agreed to replace Harimau Muda A with Harimau Muda B in the 2013 S.League campaign. Instead, Harimau Muda A prepared to defend their title in the 2013 Southeast Asian Games. Harimau Muda B have used under-20 players for the S. League and was based in the Pasir Gudang Stadium, replacing Yishun Stadium as their previous home ground. In addition, Harimau Muda C was formed to provide a bigger pool of players and become a feeder team for Harimau Muda B. Harimau Muda C made their debut in the 3rd division, 2013 Malaysia FAM League and fielded under-18 aged players. In 2015, Youth and Sports minister Khairy Jamaluddin has stated that the Football Association of Malaysia must disband the Harimau Muda system, as it was not planned for the long term and the state associations should take the responsibility to groom potential players. The new Harimau Muda participated and won the 2015 Bangabandhu Cup, their first international tournament.

== Domestic records ==
Year	League position	League	Domestic Cup	Cup position
2007–08	8/13	Malaysia Premier League	Malaysia FA Cup	Round 1
2009	1/13 Champions	Malaysia Premier League	Malaysia FA Cup	Quarter Final
2010	5/12	Malaysia Premier League	Malaysia FA Cup	Round 1
2011	10/12	Malaysia Premier League	Malaysia FA Cup	Round 2
2012	8/12	Malaysia Premier League	Malaysia FA Cup	Did not qualify
2013	9/12	S.League	Singapore Cup	Round 1
2014	12/12	S.League	Singapore Cup	Round 1
2015	7/10	S.League	Singapore Cup	Did not qualify

=== Honours ===
Malaysia

- Malaysia Premier League: 2009

Singapore

- Singapore League Cup Plate Tournament: 2013

== International records ==
=== AFF Youth Championship ===
AFF U-19 Youth Championship Record
Year	Round	GP	W	D	L	GS	GA
(Thailand) 2008	Did Not Enter						
(Vietnam) 2009	Semifinal	3	2	0	1	9	3
(Vietnam) 2010	Did Not Enter						
(Myanmar) 2011	Semifinal	4	2	1	1	12	1
(Indonesia) 2013	Round 1	5	2	2	1	9	4
Total	2/2	12	6	3	3	30	8

=== Hassanal Bolkiah Trophy ===
(Brunei) Hassanal Bolkiah Trophy (Brunei)
Year	Round	GP	W	D	L	GS	GA
2012	Group stage	4	1	1	2	3	6
2014	Third place	6	3	1	2	7	5
Total	Best: Third place	10	4	2	4	10	11

- Beginning from the 2012 edition, Malaysia has used U-21 players.

=== Nations Cup ===
Nations Cup Record
Year	Round	GP	W	D	L	GS	GA
(Malaysia) 2016	Runners-Up	2	1	0	1	4	2
Total	Best: Runners-Up	2	1	0	1	4	2

== See also ==
- Malaysia national football team
- Malaysia national under-23 football team
- Malaysia Pahang Sports School
- Malaysia XI
- FAM-MSN Project
- Singa Muda Perlis F.C.
