= Boris Kochkin =

Russian footballer

Personal information
- Full name: Boris Aleksandrovich Kochkin
- Date of birth: 28 August 1982 (age 44)
- Height: 1.74 m (5 ft 9 in)
- Positions: Forward; midfielder

Senior career*
Years	Team	Apps	(Gls)
2002–2006	FC Okean Nakhodka	118	(20)
2007	FC SKA-Energiya Khabarovsk	9	(0)
2007	FC Okean Nakhodka	15	(6)
2008	FC Metallurg Krasnoyarsk	11	(3)
2008–2009	FC Smena Komsomolsk-na-Amure	32	(4)
2010–2011	Muktijoddha Sangsad KS	44	(3)
2012	Pahang FA	23	(6)
2014	PBAPP FC	1	(0)
- * Club domestic league appearances and goals

Boris Aleksandrovich Kochkin (Russian: Борис Александрович Кочкин; born 28 August 1982) is a former Russian footballer. He was an attacking midfielder.

== Club career ==
He played in the Russian Football National League for FC SKA-Energiya Khabarovsk in 2007.

Boris previously played for Muktijoddha Sangsad KS in Bangladesh. After helping Pahang FA secure promotion to Malaysian Super League 2013, The Elephants have decided against renewing his contract for upcoming season.
