= MBJB F.C. =

Malaysian football club

MBJB FC
- Full name: Majlis Bandaraya Johor Bahru Football Club
- Nickname: The Citizen
- Founded: 2007; 19 years ago
- Ground: Tan Sri Dato Hj Hassan Yunos Stadium, Johor Bahru, Johor
- Capacity: 18,000
- Owner: Majlis Bandaraya Johor Bahru
- Chairman: Hairulisam Ismail
- Manager: Wan Azmi Wan Ahmad
- League: PBNJ State League
Home colours	Away colours

Majlis Bandaraya Johor Bahru Football Club, simply known as MBJB FC, was a Malaysian football club based in Johor Bahru, Johor. The club represented Johor Bahru City Council in Malaysia football.

== History ==
In 2009, the club was booted out from the Malaysia Premier League after only playing five matches, citing its failure to settle insurance dues before the given date.

The team was promoted back for the second time in 2012, having finished 2011 Malaysia FAM League as runners-up. This time, their campaign lasted only a season when they finished last in the 12-team league and got relegated straight back to the FAM League. They collected 5 points, scoring 18 goals while conceding 79.

After the 2012 season, the Johor Football Association made a re-structuring plan to allow only two teams to represent the state of Johor in the Malaysia Football League. Thus, MBJB FC and MP Muar FC were to be playing in the PBNJ State League.

== Honours ==
=== League ===
- Malaysia FAM Cup

(silver) Runners-up (2): 2008 & 2011

== Staff ==
=== Manager ===
Year	Name
2008–2012	(Malaysia) Hairulisam Ismail

=== Coach ===
Year	Name
2010–2012	(Malaysia) Mohamed Khairudin Abdul Rahman
2009–2010	(Malaysia) Edres Selamat
2008–09	(Malaysia) Abdul Shatar Khan Abdul Aziz Khan
