= Muriel Orlando =

Argentine footballer

Personal information
- Full name: Juan Muriel Orlando
- Date of birth: 18 March 1989 (age 37)
- Place of birth: General Conesa, Argentina
- Height: 1.81 m (5 ft 11 in)
- Position: Striker

Team information
- Current team: Douglas Haig

Senior career*
Years	Team	Apps	(Gls)
2007–2010	Huracán	10	(3)
2010–2011	CN Iquitos	13	(6)
2012–2013	Johor FA	43	(21)
2013	Estudiantes BA	–	(–)
2014–2015	León de Huánuco	10	(0)
2015	Rampla Juniors	9	(2)
2015–2016	Deportes Copiapó	15	(3)
2016	→ Deportes Antofagasta (loan)	16	(5)
2016–2018	Deportes Antofagasta	12	(0)
2018	→ Cobresal (loan)	20	(6)
2019	Olmedo	30	(10)
2020	Mushuc Runa	30	(11)
2021	Macará	13	(1)
2021	Deportivo Cuenca	7	(1)
2022	Güemes	5	(0)
2022	Deportes Santa Cruz	9	(1)
2023	Búhos ULVR	35	(13)
2024	Gualaceo	32	(4)
2025–	Douglas Haig	27	(4)
- * Club domestic league appearances and goals as of 16:17, 3 April 2026 (UTC)

Juan Muriel Orlando (born 18 March 1989) is an Argentine footballer who plays for Douglas Haig. Playing in Malaysia, he earned the nicknamed of 'Pistol' by Johor FA supporters due to his prolific goalscoring touch.
