= MP Muar F.C. =

Malaysian defunct football club

MP Muar
- Full name: Majlis Perbandaran Muar Football Club
- Nicknames: Muar; Muarian; Maharani Squad
- Founded: 2008; 18 years ago
- Ground: Sultan Ibrahim Mini Stadium, Muar, Johor
- Owner(s): Muar Municipal Council (Majlis Perbandaran Muar, MPM)
- Manager: Mohd Qayyim Sujeindran Abdullah
- League: PBNJ State League
Home colours	Away colours

Majlis Perbandaran Muar Football Club, commonly known as MP Muar FC, was a Malaysian football club based in Muar, Johor. The club home ground was the Sultan Ibrahim Mini Stadium in Muar. The club had formerly played in the Malaysian League's second division Malaysia Premier League for three consecutive seasons (2010, 2011 and 2012), before the new direction of Johor Football Association (JFA) to join the PBNJ State League only.

== History ==
MP Muar FC was formed in 2008 and owned by the Muar Municipal Council (Malay: Majlis Perbandaran Muar, MPM). Its earlier achievements originally started through its participation and 10 consecutive wins in the district locality league Liga Muar along with success in the PBNJ State League as the winner in 2008 season triggering its promotion to the Malaysia FAM League. It subsequent managed to finished third place in the 2009 season; which set for it to be promoted to Malaysia Premier League and saw the club shifted their home ground to the Tan Sri Dato Hj Hassan Yunos Stadium in Larkin, Johor Bahru in 2010 season. For the 2011 season, the club has changed to use the JCorp Stadium in Pasir Gudang, Johor Bahru but they returned to Sultan Ibrahim Mini Stadium in Muar as their home ground again for the 2012 season.

At the end of 2012 league season, MP Muar FC finished in ninth place and had to play relegation play-off match with Betaria F.C., the tenth place team. Despite MP Muar FC won the match 3-0 and qualifying it to stay in the 2013 season, but the team later had to pull out of the league as a result of the re-structuring plan by JFA, along with another club from Johor, MBJB F.C.

== Controversy ==
When the Malaysia Premier League in 2012 was just three matches into the season, one of the Perlis player was called up by the Malaysian Anti-Corruption Commission (MACC) to assist investigation of an evidence-inadequate match-fixing and corruption allegation involving the player after Perlis had been badly beaten 2–7 by MP Muar FC in earlier opening match.

The incident had also caught attention and response of Tunku Ismail Sultan Ibrahim then, the President of PBNJ and Crown Prince of Johor.

== Acquisitions, takeovers, merger and dissolution ==
In 2012, Tunku Ismail, the JFA's Royal Patron, announced that JFA would take over all football clubs and associations in the state of Johor which compete in any national level football cup competitions in Malaysia. Hence, MP Muar FC had withdrawn from 2012 Malaysia Premier League and was technically pulled out from Football Association of Malaysia (FAM). All selected players and managers were then transferred to JFA under a club Johor Darul Ta'zim based on ability and experiences.

MP Muar FC's under-21 President Cup team had in the season 2011 became the runner-up after losing the final match 1–2 (a.e.t.) to Kelantan U21. Meanwhile, albeit its achievement, the club's youth squad was also absorbed into JDT II in season 2014 and later to JDT IV in season 2015 for the President Cup competition.

Under Mutual of Understanding and Agreements, MP Muar FC would only compete in state level competition, the PBNJ State League and served a purpose of creating talent pool for local football scene. As of 2013, the team played in the Johor state league before being dissolved.

== Honours ==
- PBNJ State League
  - Champions (1): 2008
- Malaysia FAM League
  - Third place (1): 2009
- President Cup
  - Runners-up (1): 2011

== Head coaches ==
Year	Coach
2010- 2011	(Malaysia) Nick Sham Abdullah
2011–2012	(Malaysia) Abdul Nasir M. Yusoff

== Managers ==
Year	Manager
2009–2012	(Malaysia) Mohd Nazron Mahmud
2013	(Malaysia) Mohd Qayyim Sujeindran Abdullah

== Notable players ==
- Mohd Fitri Omar - the top scorer and Golden Boot winner of 2011 Malaysia Premier League with 16 goals as the striker of MP Muar.
- Sani Anuar Kamsani
- Ching Hong Aik

== See also ==
- Muar Municipal Council
- Johor Darul Ta'zim F.C.
