= Sime Darby F.C. =

Malaysian football club in Selangor

Sime Darby
- Full name: Sime Darby Football Club
- Nickname: The Giant Killers
- Founded: 22 January 2010; 16 years ago
- Ground: MP Selayang Stadium
- Capacity: 16,000
- Owner: Sime Darby Berhad
- President: Tengku Ahmad Shah
- League: KLFA First Division; Liga Puteri-FAM (women's)

Sime Darby Football Club is a Malaysian football club which was backed by the Sime Darby Berhad, one of Malaysia's largest conglomerates. The team has won the Malaysia FAM Cup twice, most recently in 2017.

== History ==
Sime Darby Football Club was formed on 22 January 2010 and played its home games at the MP Selayang Stadium. The club finished undefeated champions of the 2010 Malaysia FAM Cup in its debut season 2010, clinching promotion to the Liga Premier, the second-tier professional football league in Malaysia.

In its maiden season in the 2011 Liga Premier, the club finished fifth out of twelve clubs. For the 2011 season, the club played at the MBPJ Stadium in Kelana Jaya, Selangor. Sime Darby then beat Liga Super team Pahang 6–0 on aggregate to qualify for its first-ever Piala Malaysia tournament. For the 2012 Liga Premier, Sime Darby FC finished third behind champions ATM and second-placed Pahang.

The club was the first club in history to contest the Piala FA Malaysia final, which they managed in 2012. The final was played against Kelantan at Bukit Jalil National Stadium on Saturday, 19 May, in which the club lost 0–1. The club's meteoric rise has garnered Sime Darby FC much support from the Malaysian football fraternity with the valiant display against Kelantan who were overwhelming favourites to win the match.

In 2013, the club qualified to the quarter-finals of the Piala Malaysia for the first time, where the club lost 3–1 on aggregate to Sarawak. The club competed and finished 5th in the 2014 Malaysia Super League after securing second place in the 2013 Liga Premier. In the second season of the club in the Super League, the 2015 Malaysia Super League, they finished last in the table and were relegated to Premier League for next season.

After the end of 2016 Liga Premier season, the club has been relegated to Liga FAM after another finish at the bottom of the table. Amid rumours of the club's demise as their owner has pulled the funding, Sime Darby competed in the 2017 Malaysia FAM League, albeit with a reduced budget. The club won the competition for the second time that season, beating UKM F.C. in the final, and won the rights to promotion back to the 2018 Malaysia Premier League.

Days after the FAM League final win, Sime Darby withdrew from the 2018 Premier League, ending their involvement as a professional club. The club now competes in the KLFA First Division state league. End of financial support from the parent company and change of focus to develop youth football were cited as the reasons for the decision. In their maiden year in the KLFA League Division 1, Sime Darby FC finished 9th in the 12-club Bahagian 1B and failed to qualify for the cross over quarterfinals against the top four teams of Bahagian 1A.

== Coaching history ==
Year	Name	Nationality
January 2010	YAM Datuk Seri Tengku Ahmad Shah	Malaysia
January 2010 – December 2015	Ismail Zakaria	Malaysia
December 2015 – May 2016	Abdul Ghani Malik	Malaysia
May – November 2016	Drago Mamić	Croatia
9 December 2016 – 2018	Ahmad Yusof	Malaysia

== Honours ==
=== League ===
- Liga FAM
  - Winners (2): 2010, 2017
- Liga Premier
  - Runners-up: 2013

=== Cup ===
- Piala FA
  - Runners-up: 2012

== Kit manufacturer and sponsor ==
Period	Manufacturer	Sponsor
2010–2017	Kappa	Sime Darby

== Club affiliates ==
- (Malaysia) UKM
