= USM Stadium =

Multi-purpose stadium in Penang, Malaysia

Stadium Olahraga Universiti Sains Malaysia
- Location: Penang, Malaysia
- Owner: Universiti Sains Malaysia
- Capacity: 1,000
- Surface: Grass pitch Track

Tenants
- USM (2008–); PBAPP F.C. (2012–2016); Sungai Ara F.C. (2014–2016)

USM Stadium or Stadium Olahraga Universiti Sains Malaysia (English: Universiti Sains Malaysia Athletics Stadium) is a multi-purpose stadium in Penang, Malaysia. The stadium is under the jurisdiction of the Universiti Sains Malaysia. The stadium hosts matches of USM from 2009, most notably when the team was playing in Liga FAM and Liga Premier.

== See also ==
- Sport in Malaysia
