= Mohd Saufi Ibrahim =

Malaysian footballer

Mohd Saufi
Personal information
- Full name: Mohd Saufi bin Ibrahim
- Date of birth: 27 January 1983 (age 43)
- Place of birth: Penang, Malaysia
- Height: 1.76 m (5 ft 9 1/2 in)
- Position: Striker

Team information
- Current team: Kuala Lumpur FA

Youth career
- 2002–2004: Penang President's Cup Team

Senior career*
| Years | Team | Apps | (Gls) |
| 2005–2007 | Penang FA | 24 | (6) |
| 2007–2008 | Terengganu FA | 18 | (7) |
| 2009–2010 | Felda United FC | 16 | (5) |
| 2011 | Johor FC | 7 | (0) |
| 2012 | Betaria FC | 19 | (8) |
| 2013 | DRB-Hicom F.C. | 26 | (11) |
| 2014 | PDRM FA | 2 | (0) |
| 2015 | Kuala Lumpur FA | 6 | (1) |
| 2016 | Sg. Ara FC | | |
- * Club domestic league appearances and goals as of 28 May 2015

Mohd Saufi Ibrahim (born 27 January 1983) is a Malaysian football player currently playing for Kuala Lumpur FA, a team playing in the Malaysian Premier League. He formerly played with Betaria FC, Penang FA, Terengganu FA, DRB-Hicom F.C. and PDRM FA.

== Honours ==
=== Club ===
PDRM FA

- Malaysia Premier League: 2014
