= Johor Football Association =

Johor FA
- Full name: Johor Football Association
- Nicknames: JFA, PBNJ
- Founded: 29 December 1955

Johor Football Association (JFA; Malay: Persatuan Bolasepak Negeri Johor (PBNJ)) is the governing body of football for the state of Johor, Malaysia. JFA is responsible for coordinating and developing football in Johor, and has teamed up with the Football Association of Malaysia (FAM) as the official governing body of football in Malaysia.

== Structure ==
Johor Football Association has developed a new structure that is more involved in educating youths on living a healthy lifestyle. It is designed with the vision of Tunku Ismail Sultan Ibrahim, along with the input from Johan Cruyff. The local players who are performing well will be offered a trial at Johor Darul Ta'zim F.C.

== History ==
Formed on 29 December 1955, it was initially based in Kluang. In its early years of establishment, Johor FA was registered under the Societies Act 1966 and subsequently re-registered under the Commissioner of Sports Development Act 1997. Central to the creation of Stadium Tan Sri Haji Hassan Yunos, the association has also been entrusted to organize the first round and quarter-final of the World Youth Cup 1997, and the Asian Zone World Cup qualifier between Iran and Japan in the same year.

Johor FA starts its football development by forming its first professional football team, Johor FA. Under this period, Johor FA has made several achievements including national cup titles in 1985, 1991, and 1998, and the Razak Cup title in 1983. In 1972, the association built its first professional team, PKENJ FC, now known as Johor Darul Ta'zim F.C.

== Management ==
Positions	Name
President	(Malaysia) YB Dato' Haji Ismail bin Karim
Vice president I	(Malaysia) YB Dato' Zulkurnain Bin Kamisan
Vice president II	(Malaysia) YBhg. Dato' Kamaruzzaman Bin Abu Kassim
Secretary	(Malaysia) Kapten Mohd Fahmy bin Yahya
Treasurer	(Malaysia) YB Datuk Haji Abd Latif bin Haji Bandi

== Main competitions ==
- Johor Darul Ta'zim League (HM Sultan of Johor Cup)
- U-20 Johor Darul Ta'zim League (HRH Crown Prince of Johor Cup)
- U-18 Johor Darul Ta'zim League (Tunku Temenggong Johor Cup)
- U-16 Johor Darul Ta'zim League
- U-14 Johor Darul Ta'zim League
- U-12 Johor Darul Ta'zim League (Tunku Laksamana Johor Cup)
