= Khairul Izuan Abdullah =

Malaysian footballer (born 1986)

Khairul Izuan
Personal information
- Full name: Khairul Izuan bin Abdullah
- Date of birth: 16 May 1986 (age 40)
- Place of birth: Kedah, Malaysia
- Height: 1.68 m (5 ft 6 in)
- Positions: Winger; striker

Senior career*
Years	Team	Apps	(Gls)
2003–2021	PDRM FA		(46)
2012	→ Negeri Sembilan FA (loan)		
2022	Sri Pahang FC		
- * Club domestic league appearances and goals as of August 01, 2016 ‡ National team caps and goals as of July 16, 2017

Khairul Izuan Abdullah (born 16 May 1986) is a Malaysian footballer who plays as a striker for Malaysia Premier League side PDRM FA. He is also a police officer, ranked lance corporal, for the Royal Malaysian Police.

In 2012, Khairul emerged as the top goalscorer in the 2012 Malaysia Premier League with 23 goals.

During 2012 Malaysia Cup Khairul was loaned to the Negeri Sembilan and he scored 2 goals in 8 appearances.

In 2014, Khairul won the Malaysia Premier League with PDRM FA.

== Honours ==
=== Club ===
PDRM FA

- Malaysia Premier League: 2014

Individual

- Malaysia Premier League Golden Boot: 2012 (23 goals)
