= Selayang Municipal Council Stadium =

Stadium in Gombak, Selangor, Malaysia

Selayang Municipal Council Stadium Stadium Majlis Perbandaran Selayang ستاديوم مجليس ڤربندرن سلايڠ
- Stadium Majlis Perbandaran Selayang
- Interactive map of Selayang Municipal Council Stadium; Stadium Majlis Perbandaran Selayang ستاديوم مجليس ڤربندرن سلايڠ
- Address: GK7, Jalan 2/2, Bandar Baru Selayang, 68100 Batu Caves, Selangor
- Location: Bandar Baru Selayang, Selangor, Malaysia
- Coordinates: 3°15′18″N 101°39′26″E
- Owner: Selayang Municipal Council
- Operator: Selayang Municipal Council
- Capacity: 16,000
- Surface: Grass pitch, track and field
- Scoreboard: Digital
- Public transit: KC05 Batu Caves Komuter station; KA15 Kepong Sentral Komuter station; MPS1 Smart Selangor Bus

Construction
- Groundbreaking: September 1997
- Opened: November 1999
- Cost: RM25 million

Tenants
- MK Land F.C. (2000–2006); Sime Darby F.C. Selangor II (2020–present); Selayang City F.C. (2023–present); PDRM FC (2024–present); Gombak F.C. (2024–present)

Selayang Municipal Council Stadium (Malay: Stadium Majlis Perbandaran Selayang) is a multi-purpose stadium in Selayang, Gombak District, Selangor, Malaysia. The stadium is owned by the Majlis Perbandaran Selayang (MPS). It is currently used mostly for football matches. The stadium has a capacity of 16,000.

== History ==
Construction began in September 1997 and finished construction in September 1999. The stadium was officially opened and inaugurated on 26 November 1999 by former Menteri Besar of Selangor, Abu Hassan Omar.

== International fixtures ==
Date	Competition	Team	Score	Team
1 March 2014	Friendly	Malaysia	0–0	Philippines

=== 2017 Southeast Asian Games ===
Date	Time (UTC+08)	Team #1	Res.	Team #2	Round
14 August 2017	16:00	Myanmar	2–0	Singapore	Group Stage
15 August 2017	16:00	Vietnam	4–0	Timor-Leste	Group Stage
15 August 2017	20:45	Cambodia	0–2	Philippines	Group Stage
17 August 2017	20:45	Thailand	1–0	Timor-Leste	Group Stage
18 August 2017	16:00	Laos	0–2	Singapore	Group Stage
20 August 2017	16:00	Timor-Leste	0–1	Indonesia	Group Stage
20 August 2017	20:45	Thailand	3–0	Cambodia	Group Stage
22 August 2017	16:00	Philippines	0–2	Thailand	Group Stage
22 August 2017	20:45	Vietnam	0–0	Indonesia	Group Stage
23 August 2017	20:45	Singapore	1–0	Brunei	Group Stage
24 August 2017	16:00	Thailand	3–0	Vietnam	Group Stage
26 August 2017	16:00	Thailand	1–0	Myanmar	Semi-finals
29 August 2017	16:30	Indonesia	3–1	Myanmar	Bronze medal match
