= 2011 Kuala Lumpur FA season =

Kuala Lumpur
2011 season
- President: Astaman Abdul Aziz
- Manager: Rusli Baba
- Head Coach: Razip Ismail
- Super League: 12th
- FA Cup: Quarter-finals
- Malaysia Cup: Group Stage
- Top goalscorer: Hazwan Bakri (7)

The 2011 season was the 33rd season in Kuala Lumpur's existence, and their second consecutive year in the top flight of Malaysian football.

Kuala Lumpur qualified for the Malaysia Cup, after finishing 12th in the Super League and missed out on reaching the quarter-finals by a point after a 2–1 defeat to Selangor in the final group game. They also reached the quarter-finals of the FA Cup for the first time since 2005.

== Results and fixtures ==
=== Super League ===
==== League table ====
Pos	Team	Pld	W	D	L	GF	GA	GD	Pts	Qualification or relegation
10	Sabah	26	7	7	12	24	32	−8	28	
11	Felda United	26	7	7	12	22	34	−12	28	
12	Kuala Lumpur	26	6	8	12	23	34	−11	26	
13	Pahang (R)	26	5	7	14	19	36	−17	22	Relegation to Premier League
14	Perlis (R)	26	2	4	20	20	61	−41	10	Relegation to Premier League

Updated to match(es) played on unknown. Source: FIFA
Rules for classification: 1) Points; 2) Goal difference; 3) Number of goals scored.
(R) Relegated

==== Matches ====
Win Draw Loss

29 January 2011	Kuala Lumpur	1 – 1	Perak	KLFA Stadium, Cheras
20:45	Badrul 12'; Hazwan (yellow card) 19'; Azlan (yellow card) 28'; Azwan (yellow card) 33'	Report	Hazrul (yellow card) 64'; Shafiq 67'	Attendance: 2,000; Referee: Shokri Nor

1 February 2011	Kuala Lumpur	1 – 0	Sabah	KLFA Stadium, Cheras
20:45	Azlan (yellow card) 38'; Yong 54'; Hazwan (yellow card) 68'	Report	Hariri (yellow card) 20'; Sivakumar (yellow card) 41'	Attendance: 350; Referee: Zamzaidi Katimin

12 February 2011	Selangor	1 – 1	Kuala Lumpur	Shah Alam Stadium
20:45	Fadzli 18'; Fadzli (yellow card) 82'	Report	Azwan 54'	Attendance: 4,000; Referee: Rosdi Shahrul

15 February 2011	Kuala Lumpur	0 – 2	Kelantan	Sultan Mohammad IV Stadium, Kota Bharu
20:45	Nazrin (yellow card); Dashila (yellow card)	Report	Ramzul 48'; Norshahrul 87'	Attendance: 18,000; Referee: Subkhiddin Salleh

25 February 2011	Kuala Lumpur	1 – 2	Terengganu	Sultan Ismail Nasiruddin Shah Stadium, Kuala Terengganu
20:45	Jihad (yellow card) 25' (yellow-red card) 65'; Yong 83'		Hadi 38'; Ashaari 52'

1 March 2011	Perlis	0 – 0	Kuala Lumpur	Utama Stadium, Kangar
20:45	Hafiszuan (yellow card) (yellow-red card) 85'

11 March 2011	Johor FC	0 – 0	Kuala Lumpur	JCorp Stadium, Pasir Gudang
20:45			Farouk (yellow card) 19'

2 April 2011	Kuala Lumpur	0 – 1	Kedah	KLFA Stadium, Cheras
20:45	Hazwan (yellow card) 48'; Azlan (yellow card) 85'		Amar (yellow card) 56'; Faizal (yellow card) 61'; Azmi 90'	Attendance: 1,200; Referee: Anuar Che Husin

5 April 2011	Negeri Sembilan	0 – 1	Kuala Lumpur	Tuanku Abdul Rahman Stadium, Paroi
20:45	Fakri (yellow card) 35'		Badrul 6'; Shahrom (yellow card) 27'; Syafiq (yellow card) 56'; See (yellow card) 63'	Attendance: 4,000; Referee: Zamzaidi Katimin

9 April 2011	Kuala Lumpur	0 – 0	Pahang	KLFA Stadium, Cheras
20:45	See (yellow card) 33'; Khairul (yellow card) 57'; Fahrul (yellow card) 63'	Report	Fadzirul (yellow card) 32'; Nazrulerwan (red card) 61'	Attendance: 250; Referee: Shokri Nor

12 April 2011	Young Tigers A	1 – 0	Kuala Lumpur	Shah Alam Stadium
20:45	Syahid 16'; Izzaq (yellow card) 82'		Arman (yellow card) 62'	Attendance: 50; Referee: Romzi Zahari

16 April 2011	Kuala Lumpur	3 – 1	Kuala Terengganu T-Team	KLFA Stadium, Cheras
20:45	See 11'; Hazwan 13', 14'; Farid (yellow card) 33'		Indra (yellow card) 11', (goal) 21'	Attendance: 300; Referee: Lismatia Mohem Tasin

19 April 2011	Felda United F.C.	2 – 1	Kuala Lumpur	KLFA Stadium, Cheras
20:45	Azrul 7', 13'		Arman (yellow card) 12'; Hazwan (yellow card) 30'; Syafiq 43'	Attendance: 300; Referee: Wan Tarmizi Wan Ibrahim

22 April 2011	Kuala Lumpur	0 – 0	Felda United F.C.	KLFA Stadium, Cheras
20:45	Hazwan (yellow card) 35'		Ghani (yellow card) 57'; Syazwan (yellow card) 82'	Attendance: 250; Referee: Lismotia Mohem Tasin

26 April 2011	Perak	5 – 3	Kuala Lumpur	Perak Stadium, Ipoh
16:45	Razali 2'; Arman 16' (OG); Fazrul 62'; Syafiq 68'; Noor Hazrul 88'		See 15'; Hazwan 66'; Khairul 90+3'

30 April 2011	Kelantan	2 – 0	Kuala Lumpur	Sultan Mohammad IV Stadium, Kota Bharu
20:45	Badhri 24'; S. Chanturu 79'	Report	Syafiq (yellow card)	Attendance: 25,000; Referee: Suhaimi Mat Hassan

3 May 2011	Kuala Lumpur	1 – 3	Selangor	KLFA Stadium, Cheras
20:45	Hazwan 31'; Azmi (yellow card) 43' (yellow-red card) 61'; Syafiq (yellow card) 48'		Rudie 11', 90'; Nasriq (yellow card) 43'; Safiq 47'; Hardi (yellow card) 52'	Attendance: 2,000; Referee: Shokri Nor

6 May 2011	Terengganu	4 – 0	Kuala Lumpur	Sultan Ismail Nasiruddin Shah Stadium, Kuala Terengganu
16:45	Hadi 18'; Manaf 55', 75'; Helmi 71'

9 May 2011	Kuala Lumpur	3 – 0	Perlis	KLFA Stadium, Cheras
20:45	Hazwan 52' (pen); Khairul (yellow card) 58'; Norismaidham (yellow card) 64'; Badrul 77'; Azmi 78'		Nik Sahrul (yellow card) 56'; Phul (yellow card) 71'	Attendance: 150; Referee: Rosli Shahrul

19 May 2011	Pahang	0 – 2	Kuala Lumpur	Darul Makmur Stadium, Kuantan
20:45			Hazwan 50'; See 69'

22 May 2011	Kedah	0 – 0	Kuala Lumpur	Darul Aman Stadium, Alor Setar
20:45			Farouk (yellow card)

25 May 2011	Kuala Lumpur	1 – 1	Negeri Sembilan	KLFA Stadium, Cheras
20:45	Hazwan 24'; Shahrom (yellow card) 70'; Farid (yellow card) 76'		Alif (yellow card) 53'; Aidil 72'	Attendance: 1,000; Referee: Ku Alauddin Ku Muhammad

28 May 2011	Kuala Lumpur	1 – 2	Johor FC	KLFA Stadium, Cheras
20:45	Dashila (yellow card) 35'; Nazrin (yellow card) 75'; Khairul 84'		Azizan 8', 35'; Khairul (yellow card) 43'; Suhardy (yellow card) 78'	Attendance: 300; Referee: Dennis Sayeng

8 June 2011	Sabah	3 – 0	Kuala Lumpur	Likas Stadium, Kota Kinabalu
20:15	Razlan 5', 35' (pen), 47'		Hazwan (yellow card)

1 July 2011	Kuala Lumpur	0 – 1	Young Tigers A	Shah Alam Stadium
20:45	Norismaidham (yellow card) 74'		Fandi 45+2' (pen) (yellow card) 57'; Gary (yellow card) 80'	Attendance: 50; Referee: Rahmat Jantan

6 July 2011	Kuala Terengganu T-Team	2 – 3	Kuala Lumpur	Sultan Ismail Nasiruddin Shah Stadium, Kuala Terengganu
20:45	Indra 32'; Shamsul 81'		Badrul 4', 30', 72'; Fahrul (yellow card); Remezey (yellow card); See (yellow card); Farouk (yellow card)

=== FA Cup ===
Round 1; 20 February 2011	Kuala Lumpur	3 – 0	Pos Malaysia FC	Selayang Stadium
16:15	Afiq 49'; Badrul 52', 70'	Report	Abdullah (yellow card) 25'	Attendance: 250; Referee: Sani Tari

Round 2; 4 March 2011	Negeri Sembilan	0 – 0 (aet, KL won 4-2 on pen)	Kuala Lumpur	Tuanku Abdul Rahman Stadium, Paroi
20:45	Aminuddin (yellow card) 25'; Hairuddin (yellow card) 112'		Shahrom (yellow card) 21'; Dashila (yellow card) 97'; Norazlan (yellow card) 101'	Attendance: 5,000

QF, 1st leg 15 March 2011	Kuala Lumpur	1 – 2	Pahang	Darul Makmur Stadium, Kuantan
20:45	Azlan 53' (pen)		Famirul 35'; Azamuddin 65'

QF, 2nd leg 18 March 2011	Pahang	0 – 0 (Pahang won 2-1 on agg)	Kuala Lumpur	Darul Makmur Stadium, Kuantan
20:45	Fadzirul (yellow card) 43'; Fazli (yellow card) 57'		Syafiq (yellow card) 86'; Shahrom (yellow card) 90'

=== Malaysia Cup ===
Round 1, Group D 6 September 2011	Police	0 – 3	Kuala Lumpur	Tuanku Abdul Rahman Stadium, Paroi
20:45	Isham (yellow card) 45+1'; Al Husairi (red card) 61'		44' (OG) Azrul; 64' (pen) Badrul; 76' Yong	Attendance: 100; Referee: Juhairi Idris

Round 1, Group D 10 September 2011	Kuala Lumpur	2 – 1	Kuala Terengganu T-Team	Selayang Stadium
20:45	Yong 27', 47'		45+1' Norfadzly	Attendance: 600; Referee: Tiong Eng Lai

Round 1, Group D 13 September 2011	Kuala Lumpur	0 – 0	Selangor	Selayang Stadium
20:45	Dzaiddin (yellow card) 40'; Shahrom (yellow card) 45'; Farid (yellow card) 78'; Yong (yellow card) 85'	Report	(yellow card) 88' Nasriq	Attendance: 1,200; Referee: Shukri Nor

Round 1, Group D 17 September 2011	Kuala Lumpur	0 – 0	Police	Selayang Stadium
20:45	Syafiq (yellow card) 81'	Report	Azrul (yellow card) 21'; Alif (yellow card) 71'; Isham (yellow card) 76'	Attendance: 100; Referee: Fairuzi Mat Desa

Round 1, Group D 24 September 2011	Kuala Terengganu T-Team	1 – 1	Kuala Lumpur	Sultan Ismail Nasiruddin Shah Stadium, Kuala Terengganu
20:45	Indra 26'; Hasbullah (yellow card) 63'	Report	Hazwan 46'	Referee: Nazmi Nasaruddin

Round 1, Group D 27 September 2011	Selangor	2 – 1	Kuala Lumpur	Shah Alam Stadium
20:45	Azidan (yellow card) 33'; Amri (yellow card) 42'; Nazri (yellow card) 63'; Razman 65'; Amri 76'; G. Jeevananthan (yellow card) 82'		37' Shahrom; (yellow card) 59' Hazwan; (yellow card) 64' Dashila; (yellow card) 80' Azmi	Attendance: 4,000; Referee: Nafeez Abd Wahab

=== Friendly matches ===
4 December 2010	Kuala Lumpur	2 – 1	Police	KLFA Stadium, Cheras
17:00	Khairul

8 December 2010	PKNS F.C.	3 – 0	Kuala Lumpur	PKNS Sports Complex, Kelana Jaya
17:00

12 December 2010	Kuala Lumpur	0 – 2	Malaysia	KLFA Stadium, Cheras
17:00			Amri 21'; Khyril 41' (pen)

27 December 2010	Kuala Lumpur	2 – 1	Muar Municipal Council FC	KLFA Stadium, Cheras
17:00	A Hazwan; Azwan

29 December 2010	Kuala Lumpur	2 – 2	Terengganu	KLFA Stadium, Cheras
17:00	Azlan; Afiq

30 December 2010	Sarawak	1 – 2	Kuala Lumpur	Maybank Sports Centre, Bangi
17:00	Azmi; Afiq

31 December 2010	Negeri Sembilan	1 – 0	Kuala Lumpur	Tuanku Abdul Rahman Stadium, Paroi
20:00

7 January 2011	Kuala Lumpur	4 – 0	(Singapore) Kaki Bukit SC	KLFA Stadium, Cheras
20:30	Fahruzzahar; Yong; Azwan; Farouk

8 January 2011	Kuala Lumpur	1 – 0	Johor	KLFA Stadium, Cheras
17:00	Azwan

15 January 2011	Kuala Lumpur	1 – 1	Pos Malaysia FC	KLFA Stadium, Cheras
17:00	Khairul

17 January 2011	Kuala Lumpur	2 – 0	Sinar Dimaja Mai Sarah Navy	KLFA Stadium, Cheras
17:00	Khairul; Hazwan

21 January 2011	Kuala Lumpur	4 – 0	Johor Baru City Council	UPM Stadium, Serdang
17:00	Badrul, Afiq; See

23 January 2011	Kuala Lumpur	3 – 3	(Singapore) Hougang United FC	KLFA Stadium, Cheras
17:00	Badrul; Afiq; Azwan pen'		Basit; Webb; Delgado

26 March 2011	Kuala Lumpur	4 – 3	Pos Malaysia FC	KLFA Stadium, Cheras
17:00

29 March 2011	Kuala Lumpur	3 – 0	Muar Municipal Council FC	KLFA Stadium, Cheras
17:00

6 August 2011	Malaysian Universities	1 – 0	Kuala Lumpur	UiTM Stadium, Shah Alam
20:30

14 August 2011	Kuala Lumpur	0 – 5	Kelantan	Selayang Stadium
22:15		Report	10' Nurul; 23' Azamuddin; (yellow card) 33' Shakir; 53' Badri; 76' Solehin; 89' R. Surendran	Attendance: 500

16 August 2011	Felda United F.C.	0 – 0	Kuala Lumpur	BSN Training Centre, Bangi
22:00		Report		Attendance: 30

20 August 2011	PKNS F.C.	1 – 0	Kuala Lumpur	PKNS Sports Complex, Petaling Jaya
22:00

23 August 2011	Kuala Lumpur	1 – 2	Johor FC	Maybank Training Centre, Bangi
21:45	Badrul 35'	Report	71' Irfan; 87' Rashid	Attendance: 20

27 August 2011	Kuala Lumpur	0 – 1	Sime Darby F.C.	Maybank Training Centre, Bangi
21:30		Report	(yellow card) 16' K. Linggam; 34' Yusri	Attendance: 20

=== Malaysia Cup Group D ===
Team	Pld	W	D	L	GF	GA	GD	Pts
(Terengganu) PBDKT T-Team FC	6	4	1	1	15	4	+11	13
Selangor FA	6	3	1	2	9	5	+4	10
Kuala Lumpur FA	6	2	3	1	7	4	+3	9
(Kuala Lumpur) PDRM FA	6	0	1	5	1	19	−18	1

== Squad statistics ==
Only lists players who made an appearance or were on the bench.

Player	Nat	Pos	Starts	As substitute	Total appearances	Super League G	Malaysia Cup G	FA Cup G	Total G
Badrul Hisyam Azmi	(Malaysia)	FW	17	12	29	6	1	2	9
Ahmad Hazwan Bakri	(Malaysia)	MF	18	4	22	7	1	0	8
Yong Kuong Yong	(Malaysia)	MF	17	7	24	2	3	0	5
See Kok Luen	(Malaysia)	MF	22	5	27	3	0	0	3
Khairul Anuar Shafie	(Malaysia)	MF	17	6	23	2	0	0	2
Syafiq Johari	(Malaysia)	MF	32	1	33	1	0	0	1
Shahrom Kalam	(Malaysia)	DF	32	0	32	0	1	0	1
Afiq Azmi	(Malaysia)	FW	9	12	21	0	0	1	1
Ahmad Azlan Zainal	(Malaysia)	DF	13	4	17	0	0	1	1
Azmi Sarmin	(Malaysia)	FW	10	5	15	1	0	0	1
Azwan Abdul Malek	(Malaysia)	MF	7	2	9	1	0	0	1
Ahmad Dashila Tajudin	(Malaysia)	DF	33	0	33	0	0	0	0
Norazlan Razali	(Malaysia)	GK	33	0	33	0	0	0	0
Norismaidham Ismail	(Malaysia)	MF	17	11	28	0	0	0	0
Fahrul Razi Kamaruddin	(Malaysia)	MF	16	12	28	0	0	0	0
Farid Ramli	(Malaysia)	DF	24	0	24	0	0	0	0
Nazrin Nawi	(Malaysia)	MF	15	7	22	0	0	0	0
Farouk Hashim	(Malaysia)	DF	19	1	20	0	0	0	0
Dzaiddin Zainudin	(Malaysia)	DF	10	0	10	0	0	0	0
Arman Fareez Ali	(Malaysia)	DF	8	2	10	0	0	0	0
Hazwan Rahman	(Malaysia)	MF	7	3	10	0	0	0	0
Ahmad Jihad Ismail	(Malaysia)	DF	6	3	9	0	0	0	0
Syazmin Firdaus Aminuddin	(Malaysia)	MF	3	4	7	0	0	0	0
Fitri Jamaludin	(Malaysia)	DF	5	1	6	0	0	0	0
S Sivaraj	(Malaysia)	FW	2	2	4	0	0	0	0
Remezey Che Ros	(Malaysia)	GK	3	0	3	0	0	0	0
Fahruzzahar Ali	(Malaysia)	FW	1	1	2	0	0	0	0
Zahid Ahmad	(Malaysia)	GK	0	1	1	0	0	0	0

== Transfers ==
Below are the transfers involving Kuala Lumpur.

=== In ===
Date	Pos.	Name	From	Fee
December 2010	FW	(Malaysia) Afiq Azmi	(Malaysia) Tambun Tulang F.C.	Free
December 2010	FW	(Malaysia) Nazrin Nawi	(Malaysia) KL PLUS FC	Free
December 2010	MF	(Malaysia) Norismaidham Ismail	(Malaysia) Felda United F.C.	Free
December 2010	FW	(Malaysia) Fahrul Razi Kamaruddin	(Malaysia) UiTM F.C.	Free

=== Out ===
Date	Pos.	Name	To	Fee
August 2011	MF	(Malaysia) Nazrin Nawi		Released
November 2010	MF	(Malaysia) Azidan Sarudin	(Malaysia) Selangor	Free
November 2010	MF	(Malaysia) Mohd Raimi Md Nor	(Malaysia) Sime Darby F.C.	RM12,000
November 2010	MF	(Malaysia) Shahrudin Yakup	(Malaysia) Sime Darby F.C.	RM3,000
November 2010	MF	(Malaysia) Jeremy Matthew Danker	(Malaysia) Sabah	RM2,000
November 2010	DF	(Malaysia) Syazwan Rani	(Malaysia) Rapid KL FC	released
