= 2015 Selangor FA season =

2015 season of Malaysian association football club

Selangor FA
2015 season
- Chairman: Mohamed Azmin Ali
- Manager: Amirudin Shari
- Head coach: Mehmet Duraković
- Stadium: Shah Alam Stadium
- Super League: 2nd
- FA Cup: Round of 16
- Malaysia Cup: Winners
- Top goalscorer: League: (8 goals); Guilherme de Paula; Afiq Azmi; All: (13 goals); Guilherme de Paula
- Highest home attendance: 47,436; Malaysia Cup; Selangor vs Pahang (06 December 2015)
- Lowest home attendance: 1,500; Super League; Selangor vs ATM (12 August 2015)
- Average home league attendance: 8,995
- Biggest win: Super League; 4–0 v LionsXII (H) (18 April 2015)
- Biggest defeat: Malaysia Cup; 0–3 v Kelantan (H) (12 September 2015)
Home colours	Away colours	Third colours

The 2015 Selangor FA Season is Selangor FA's 10th season in the Malaysia Super League since its inception in 2004.

Selangor FA began the season on 7 February 2015. They competed in two domestic cups; The FA Cup Malaysia and Malaysia Cup.

== Kit ==
Supplier: Kappa / Sponsor: Selangor

Home	Away	Third	Goalkeeper

== Players ==
=== First Team Squad ===
No.	Name	Nationality	Position(s)	Since	Signed from
Goalkeepers
1	Syamim Othman	(Malaysia)	GK	2013	Johor Darul Ta'zim
21	Hamsani Ahmad	(Malaysia)	GK	2013	Negeri Sembilan
22	Norazlan Razali	(Malaysia)	GK	2015	Johor Darul Ta'zim
Defenders
2	Robert Cornthwaite	(Australia)	CB / DM	2013	(South Korea) Jeonnam Dragons
3	Azmi Muslim	(Malaysia)	LB / CB	2013	FELDA United
4	Shazlan Alias	(Malaysia)	RB	2013	T–Team
5	Shahrom Kalam	(Malaysia)	CB / DM	2013	Perak
6	S. Subramaniam	(Malaysia)	CB / RB / DM	2015	Johor Darul Ta'zim
12	Bunyamin Umar	(Malaysia)	CB / RB / DM	2009	UPB-MyTeam
17	Rizal Fahmi	(Malaysia)	CB / RB	2013	Kelantan
20	Azrif Nasrulhaq	(Malaysia)	RB / RW	2015	Harimau Muda A
Midfielders
7	Andik Vermansyah	(Indonesia)	LW / RW	2013	(Indonesia) Persebaya 1927
8	Leandro Dos Santos	(Brazil)	CM	2015	T–Team
10	Nazmi Faiz	(Malaysia)	CM / AM	2014	PKNS
15	Raimi Mohd Nor	(Malaysia)	LB / RB	2015	FELDA United
16	Saiful Ridzuwan	(Malaysia)	DM / CM	2015	Harimau Muda A
18	K. Thanaraj	(Malaysia)	LW / RW	2015	Johor Darul Ta'zim
23	S. Veenod	(Malaysia)	CM	2012	USM
24	Fitri Shazwan	(Malaysia)	LW / RW / CM / AM	2006	President's Cup
25	K. Gurusamy	(Malaysia)	DM / CM	2012	Harimau Muda A
Forwards
9	A. Thamil Arasu	(Malaysia)	ST / CF	2013	Harimau Muda A
11	Hazwan Bakri	(Malaysia)	ST / CF	2013	Harimau Muda A
13	Guilherme de Paula	(Brazil)	ST / CF	2015	(Moldova) Milsami Orhei
14	Hadi Yahya	(Malaysia)	ST / CF	2013	Perak
19	Afiq Azmi	(Malaysia)	ST / CF	2012	Kelantan

== Transfers ==
=== Transfers in ===
Date	No.	Pos.	Name	Age	Moving from	Type	Transfer fee	Team	Ref.
1 November 2014	6	DF	(Malaysia) S. Subramaniam	29	(Malaysia) Johor Darul Ta'zim	Contract expired	Free transfer	First team	
7 November 2014	15	MF	(Malaysia) Raimi Mohd Nor	28	(Malaysia) FELDA United	Loan return	N/A	First team	N/A
27 November 2014	16	MF	(Malaysia) Saiful Ridzuwan	22	(Malaysia) Harimau Muda A	—	Free transfer	First team	
30 November 2014	22	GK	(Malaysia) Norazlan Razali	28	(Malaysia) Johor Darul Ta'zim	Contract expired	Free transfer	First team	
1 December 2014	2	DF	(Australia) Robert Cornthwaite	29	(South Korea) Jeonnam Dragons	Contract expired	Free transfer	First team	
13 December 2014	18	MF	(Malaysia) K. Thanaraj	28	(Malaysia) FELDA United	Contract expired	Free transfer	First team	
30 December 2014	8	MF	(Brazil) Leandro Dos Santos	28	(Malaysia) T–Team	Contract expired	Free transfer	First team	
30 December 2014	13	FW	(Brazil) Guilherme de Paula	28	(Moldova) FC Milsami Orhei	Contract expired	Free transfer	First team	
31 January 2015	20	DF	(Malaysia) Azrif Nasrulhaq	23	(Malaysia) Harimau Muda A	—	Free transfer	First team	

=== Transfers out ===
Date	No.	Pos.	Name	Age	Moving to	Type	Transfer fee	Team	Ref.
13 November 2014	18	DF	(Malaysia) P. Rajesh	29	(Malaysia) Kedah	Contract expired	Free transfer	First team	
26 November 2014	9	FW	(Brazil) Paulo Rangel	29	(Malaysia) Terengganu	Contract expired	Free transfer	First team	
30 November 2014	4	DF	(Australia) Steve Pantelidis	31	(Australia) Oakleigh Cannons	Contract expired	Free transfer	First team	
30 November 2014	16	MF	(Malaysia) S. Kunanlan	28	(Malaysia) Johor Darul Ta'zim	Contract expired	Free transfer	First team	
30 November 2014	25	GK	(Malaysia) Farizal Marlias	28	(Malaysia) Johor Darul Ta'zim	Contract expired	Free transfer	First team	
1 January 2015	6	MF	(Malaysia) Shukur Jusoh	25	(Malaysia) ATM	Contract expired	Free transfer	First team	
1 January 2015	27	DF	(Brazil) Evaldo	31	(Brazil) Esporte Clube Mamoré	Contract expired	Free transfer	First team	

== Pre-season and friendlies ==
5 January 2015 Walikota Padang Cup	Persiba Balikpapan (Indonesia)	1–0	(Malaysia) Selangor	Padang, West Sumatera, Indonesia
8:45pm	Wirahadi 87' (pen.)	Report		Stadium: Haji Agus Salim Stadium; Attendance: 100; Referee: Aprisman Aranda (Indonesia)

7 January 2015 Walikota Padang Cup	Semen Padang (Indonesia)	2–2 (4–3 p)	(Malaysia) Selangor	Padang, West Sumatera, Indonesia
20:45 UTC+08:00	Airlangga 22'; Vizcarra 49'	Report	Thamil 37'; Afiq 75'	Stadium: Haji Agus Salim Stadium
	Penalties
	(penalty scored) Irsyad; (penalty scored) Safrial; (penalty scored) Hendra; (penalty scored) Seftia		(penalty scored) Hadi; (penalty scored) Cornthwaite; (penalty scored) Afiq; (penalty missed) Nazmi

16 January 2015 Friendly	Penang (Malaysia)	2–0	(Malaysia) Selangor	George Town, Penang
20:45 UTC+08:00	Gonçalves 22' (pen.) 74'	Report		Stadium: Penang City Stadium; Attendance: 2,500; Referee: Abubakar Ago (Nigeria)

29 January 2015 Friendly	Selangor (Malaysia)	3–1	(Malaysia) Penang	Shah Alam, Selangor
20:45 UTC+08:00	Andik 25'; Dos Santos 32' (pen.) de Paula 43'	Report	Azniee 12'	Stadium: Shah Alam Stadium; Attendance: 5,000

== Competitions ==
=== Overview ===
Competition	First match	Last match	Starting round	Final position	Record							
Competition	First match	Last match	Starting round	Final position	Pld	W	D	L	GF	GA	GD	Win %
Malaysia Super League	7 February 2015	29 August 2015	Matchday 1	2nd	22	11	6	5	43	28	+15	50.00
Malaysia FA Cup	28 February 2015	18 March 2015	Round of 32	Round of 16	2	0	1	1	3	5	−2	0.00
Malaysia Cup	12 September 2015	12 December 2015	Group stage	Winners	11	6	3	2	13	9	+4	54.55
Total					35	17	10	8	59	42	+17	48.57

Last updated: 12 December 2015
Source: Competitions

=== Malaysia Super League ===
==== Table ====
Pos	Team	Pld	W	D	L	GF	GA	GD	Pts	Qualification or relegation
1	Johor Darul Ta'zim (C)	22	14	4	4	36	18	+18	46	Qualification to AFC Champions League qualifying preliminary round 2
2	Selangor	22	11	6	5	43	28	+15	39	Qualification to AFC Cup group stage (Note: Since Lions XII, who won the 2015 Piala FA, are a side managed by the Football Association of Singapore and thus ineligible to represent Malaysia in continental competition, the 2015 Liga Super runners-up will be chosen to represent Malaysia in the AFC Cup.)
3	Pahang	22	13	5	4	43	29	+14	38 (Note: Pahang was docked 6 points due to involvement in the delay in the process of solving the problem of salary and compensation by the former imports season 2013, Mohamed Borji.)	
4	Terengganu	22	12	2	8	40	33	+7	38	
5	Felda United	22	10	6	6	36	26	+10	36	

Source: FAM Official Site, Astro Arena
Rules for classification: 1) points; 2) goal difference; 3) number of goals scored
(C) Champions

==== Results summary ====
Overall								Home						Away					
Pld	W	D	L	GF	GA	GD	Pts	W	D	L	GF	GA	GD	W	D	L	GF	GA	GD
22	11	6	5	43	28	+15	39	7	2	2	22	11	+11	4	4	3	21	17	+4

Source: Super League fixtures and results

==== Results by matches ====
Round	1	2	3	4	5	6	7	8	9	10	11	12	13	14	15	16	17	18	19	20	21	22
Ground	A	A	H	A	H	H	A	H	A	H	A	H	H	H	A	H	A	A	H	A	H	A
Result	L	D	D	W	W	W	W	W	L	L	D	W	W	L	L	D	D	W	W	D	W	W
Position	9	9	9	8	3	3	1	1	2	4	3	3	3	4	5	5	4	3	3	3	3	2

Source: Super League fixtures and results
A = Away; H = Home; W = Win; D = Draw; L = Loss

==== Matches ====
The league fixtures were announced on 25 January 2015.

Win Draw Loss

7 February 2015 1	Terengganu	2–0	Selangor	Kuala Terengganu, Terengganu
20:45 UTC+08:00	Ismail Faruqi 38'; Zubir (yellow card) 53'; Manaf (yellow card) 63'; Gustavo 73'	Report		Stadium: Sultan Ismail Nasiruddin Shah Stadium; Attendance: 10,000; Referee: Syed Azhar Syed Kamar

14 February 2015 2	Pahang	1–1	Selangor	Kuantan, Pahang
20:45 UTC+08:00	Razman (yellow card) 54'; Conti 58'; Hafiz (yellow card) 79' (yellow-red card) 90+1'	Report	Andik 64'; Cornthwaite (yellow card) 80'; Azrif (yellow card) 82'; Norazlan (yellow card) 86'; Dos Santos (yellow card) 90'	Stadium: Darul Makmur Stadium; Attendance: 16,500; Referee: Nagor Amir Noor Mohamed

21 February 2015 3	Selangor	1–1	Johor Darul Ta'zim	Shah Alam, Selangor
20:45 UTC+08:00	Andik 1'; Shahrom (yellow card) 21'; Azrif (yellow card) 34'; Dos Santos (yellow card) 74'; Thamil (yellow card) 82'	Report	Hariss (yellow card) 23'; Safiq (yellow card) 34'; Figueroa 63'; Marcos Antônio (yellow card) 86'	Stadium: Shah Alam Stadium; Attendance: 25,000; Referee: Samsudin Ibrahim

7 March 2015 4	PDRM	1–4	Selangor	Shah Alam, Selangor
20:45 UTC+08:00	Kughegbe (yellow card) 41'; Thirumurugan (yellow card) 57'; D. Traore 59'	Report	Hazwan 23' (yellow card) 55'; Afiq 46' (yellow card) 70'; Rizal (yellow card) 51'; Raimi (yellow card) 66'; Hadi 75' de Paula 78'; Dos Santos (yellow card) 81'	Stadium: Shah Alam Stadium; Attendance: 7,000; Referee: Nazmi Nasaruddin

14 March 2015 5	Selangor	2–0	Sarawak	Shah Alam, Selangor
20:45 UTC+08:00	Afiq 10'; Nazmi (yellow card) 56'; Fitri 77'	Report	Dzulazlan (yellow card) 16'; Griffiths (yellow card) 89'	Stadium: Shah Alam Stadium; Attendance: 10,000; Referee: Suhaizi Shukri

4 April 2015 6	Selangor	3–2	Sime Darby	Shah Alam, Selangor
20:45 UTC+08:00	Andik 55'; Hazwan 60'; Gurusamy (yellow card) 66'; Rizal (yellow card) 69'; Cornthwaite 79'; Hadi (yellow card) 90'	Report	Fahrul (yellow card) 36'; Vidaković 70'; Prabakaran (yellow card) 71'; Sharofetdinov 90+4'	Stadium: Shah Alam Stadium; Attendance: 4,600; Referee: Suhaizi Shukri

11 April 2015 7	ATM	1–3	Selangor	Paroi, Negeri Sembilan
20:45 UTC+08:00	Karlović 25'; Azreen (yellow card) 44'; Azmeer (yellow card) 74'	Report	Afiq 9', 52'; Dos Santos 72' (pen.)	Stadium: Tuanku Abdul Rahman Stadium; Attendance: 2,500; Referee: Zamzaidi Katimin

18 April 2015 8	Selangor	4–0	(Singapore) LionsXII	Shah Alam, Selangor
20:45 UTC+08:00	Afiq 7', 11', 15'; Syamim (yellow card) 44' de Paula 78'	Report	Firdaus (yellow card) 51'; Faris (yellow card) 70'; Hafiz (yellow card) 89'	Stadium: Shah Alam Stadium; Attendance: 9,415; Referee: Nazmi Nasaruddin

25 April 2015 9	Kelantan	2–1	Selangor	Kota Bharu, Kelantan
20:45 UTC+08:00	Gilmar 5'; McKain (yellow card) 7'; Norhafiz (yellow card) 53'; Farisham (yellow card) 66'; Austin Iwuji (yellow card) 69'; Farhan 73'; Khairul Fahmi (yellow card) 80'	Report	de Paula (yellow card) 6'; Nazmi 12'; Cornthwaite (yellow card) 52'; Dos Santos (yellow card) 60'; Afiq (yellow card) 66'	Stadium: Sultan Muhammad IV Stadium; Attendance: 8,517; Referee: Nafeez Abd Wahab

2 May 2015 10	Selangor	1–2	Perak	Shah Alam, Selangor
20:45 UTC+08:00	de Paula 19'; Cornthwaite (yellow card) 64'; Dos Santos (yellow card) 85'	Report	Namkung 45+3' (pen.) (yellow card) 90+3'; Nurridzuan (yellow card) 51' (yellow-red card) 86' (goal) 62'; Nasir (yellow card) 52'; Tuah (yellow card) 82'	Stadium: Shah Alam Stadium; Attendance: 17,884; Referee: Syed Azhar Syed Kamar

20 June 2015 11	FELDA United	4–4	Selangor	Selayang, Selangor
22:00 UTC+08:00	Fernandes 17', 23'; Hasnizaidi (yellow card) 27' (yellow-red card) 45+1'; Indra 37'; Makeche 49' (yellow card) 55'; Farizal (yellow card) 76'; Miladinović (yellow card) 86'	Report	Hazwan 13', 40'; Dos Santos (yellow card) 45+1' (yellow-red card) 45+2'; Gurusamy 64'; Hadi 77' (pen.)	Stadium: Selayang Stadium; Attendance: 2,274; Referee: Amirul Izwan Yaacob

23 June 2015 12	Selangor	1–0	FELDA United	Shah Alam, Selangor
22:00 UTC+08:00	Cornthwaite 37'; Nazmi (yellow card) 45+2'	Report	Syamim (yellow card) 27'; Shahrulnizam (yellow card) 49'; Makeche (yellow card) 90+1'	Stadium: Shah Alam Stadium; Attendance: 3,000; Referee: Zamzaidi Katimin

27 June 2015 13	Selangor	2–0	Terengganu	Shah Alam, Selangor
20:45 UTC+08:00	Hadi 4'; Cornthwaite 23'	Report		Stadium: Shah Alam Stadium; Attendance: 4,142; Referee: Nagor Amir Noor Mohamed

4 July 2015 14	Selangor	1–3	Pahang	Shah Alam, Selangor
22:00 UTC+08:00	Cornthwaite 5' (yellow card) 32'; Azrif (yellow card) 90'	Report	Rehman 50'; Conti 59' (yellow card) 62'; Hafiz 68' (yellow card) 89'	Stadium: Shah Alam Stadium; Attendance: 11,223; Referee: Nafeez Abd Wahab

13 July 2015 15	Johor Darul Ta'zim	3–1	Selangor	Larkin, Johor Bahru, Johor
21:45 UTC+08:00	Amri 10'; Nazrin (yellow card) 23'; Jasazrin (yellow card) 29'; Safiq (yellow card) 33'; Figueroa 45+3', 79'; Kunanlan (yellow card) 87'	Report	Andik 45'; Dos Santos (yellow card) 77'; Gurusamy (yellow card) 84'	Stadium: Tan Sri Dato Haji Hassan Yunos Stadium; Attendance: 11,340; Referee: Samsudin Ibrahim

1 August 2015 16	Selangor	1–1	PDRM	Shah Alam, Selangor
20:45 UTC+08:00	Bunyamin (yellow card) 45+2'; Andik 88'	Report	Ashfaq 8'; Nizam (yellow card) 88'	Stadium: Shah Alam Stadium; Attendance: 2,500; Referee: Suhaizi Shukri

5 August 2015 17	Sarawak	1–1	Selangor	Kuching, Sarawak
20:45 UTC+08:00	Dzulazlan (yellow card) 16'; Ronny (yellow card) 72'; Fatić (yellow card) 73'; Nyema 75'	Report	Andik 39'	Stadium: Sarawak Stadium; Attendance: 2,150; Referee: Ahmad Zuhadi Dzulkifli

8 August 2015 18	Sime Darby	1–3	Selangor	Selayang, Selangor
20:45 UTC+08:00	Reinaldo 31'; Juzaili (yellow card) 59'; Fahrul (yellow card) 73'	Report	Rizal 18' de Paula 26'; Hazwan (yellow card) 72'; Hadi 81'	Stadium: Majlis Perbandaran Selayang Stadium; Attendance: 1,733; Referee: Tiong Eng Tai

12 August 2015 19	Selangor	3–2	ATM	Shah Alam, Selangor
20:45 UTC+08:00	de Paula 32'; Hazwan 48'; Shahrom 55'; Azrif (yellow card) 70'	Report	Abdulafees 45+2'; Fazrul (yellow card) 62'; Shukur 90+4'	Stadium: Shah Alam Stadium; Attendance: 1,500; Referee: S. Sittharanjanan

15 August 2015 20	LionsXII (Singapore)	1–1	Selangor	Kallang, Singapore
19:45 UTC+08:00	Nazrul (yellow card) 44'; Quak (yellow card) 65'; Khairul 88'	Report	Afiq 50'; Dos Santos (yellow card) 82'; Norazlan (yellow card) 90+4'	Stadium: Jalan Besar Stadium; Attendance: 5,814; Referee: Suhaizi Shukri

22 August 2015 21	Selangor	3–0	Kelantan	Shah Alam, Selangor
20:45 UTC+08:00	Hazwan 23' de Paula 48', 63' (pen.); Nazmi (red card) 88'	Report	Mckain (yellow card) 32'; Shahrizan (yellow card) 62'; Carrillo (yellow card) 88'	Stadium: Shah Alam Stadium; Attendance: 9,686; Referee: Suhaizi Shukri

29 August 2015 22	Perak	0–2	Selangor	Ipoh, Perak
20:45 UTC+08:00	Hisyamudin (yellow card) 56'	Report	Hazwan 27' de Paula 71'	Stadium: Stadium Perak; Attendance: 7,000; Referee: Zulkifli Ahmad

==== Results overview ====
Win Draw Loss

Team	Home score	Away score	Double
ATM	3–2	3–1	6–3
FELDA United	1–0	4–4	5–4
Johor Darul Ta'zim	1–1	1–3	2–4
Kelantan	3–0	1–2	4–2
(Singapore) LionsXII	4–0	1–1	5–1
Pahang	1–3	1–1	2–4
PDRM	1–1	4–1	5–2
Perak	1–2	2–0	3–2
Sarawak	2–0	1–1	3–1
Sime Darby	3–2	3–1	6–3
Terengganu	2–0	0–2	2–2

=== FA Cup ===
28 February 2015 RO32	FELDA United	2–2 (a.e.t.) (2–4 p)	Selangor	Selayang, Selangor
20:45 UTC+08:00	Syamim (yellow card) 16'; Shahrulnizam (yellow card) 36'; Miladinović 47' (pen.); Makeche 51'; Aizulridzwan (yellow card) 63'; Shukor (yellow card) 97'	Report	Hazwan (yellow card) 40' (goal) 78'; Cornthwaite (yellow card) 82'; Guilherme 88'; Andik (red card) 102'; Dos Santos (yellow card) 103'	Stadium: Selayang Stadium; Attendance: 7,328; Referee: Nagor Amir Noor Mohamed
	Penalties
	Makeche (penalty missed); Wilson (penalty missed); Miladinović (penalty scored); Shahrulnizam (penalty scored)		(penalty scored) Guilherme; (penalty scored) Hadi; (penalty scored) Gurusamy; (penalty scored) Cornthwaite

18 March 2015 RO16	Selangor	1–3 (a.e.t.)	Terengganu	Shah Alam, Selangor
20:45 UTC+08:00	Guilherme 21' (yellow card) 113'; Dos Santos (yellow card) 61'	Report	Sharin (yellow card) 68'; Rangel (yellow card) 84'; Bikana 89'; Cornthwaite 104' (o.g.); Sharbinee (yellow card) 110'; Zairo 120'; Fakhrurazi (yellow card) 120+4'	Stadium: Shah Alam Stadium; Attendance: 14,300; Referee: Zamzaidi Katimin

=== Malaysia Cup ===
Selangor joined the competition in the group stage.

==== Group stage ====
Pos	Team	Pld	W	D	L	GF	GA	GD	Pts	Qualification	SEL	FEL	KEL	TTE
1	Selangor	6	3	1	2	6	7	−1	10	Advance to knockout phase	—	0–0	0–3	2–1
2	FELDA United	6	2	3	1	10	7	+3	9	Advance to knockout phase	3–2	—	2–2	3–0
3	Kelantan	6	2	2	2	10	8	+2	8		0–1	1–1	—	3–1
4	T–Team	6	2	0	4	7	11	−4	6		0–1	2–1	3–1	—

Source: FAM Astro Arena

12 September 2015 1	Selangor	0–3	Kelantan	Shah Alam, Selangor
20:45 UTC+8	de Paula (yellow card) 38'; Afiq (yellow card) 45'; Shahrom (yellow card) 60'	Report	Gilmar 26', 53'; Amiridzwan (yellow card) 31'; McKain (yellow card) 38'; Iwuji 49'; Badhri (yellow card) 74'	Stadium: Shah Alam Stadium; Attendance: 13,260; Referee: Nazmi Nasaruddin

19 September 2015 2	T–Team	0–1	Selangor	Kuala Terengganu, Terengganu
20:45 UTC+8	Bušić (yellow card) 42'; Badrul (yellow card) 50'; Marzuki (yellow card) 65'	Report	Gurusamy (yellow card) 20'; Hazwan (yellow card) 45+2' de Paula 51'	Stadium: Sultan Ismail Nasiruddin Shah Stadium; Attendance: 1,250; Referee: Syed Azhar Syed Kamar

26 September 2015 3	Selangor	0–0	FELDA United	Shah Alam, Selangor
20:45 UTC+8	Bunyamin (yellow card) 87'	Report	Shahrul (yellow card) 66'; Aizulridzwan (yellow card) 74'; Thiago (yellow card) 83'	Stadium: Shah Alam Stadium; Attendance: 5,273; Referee: Nazmi Nasaruddin

2 October 2015 4	Kelantan	0–1	Selangor	Kota Bharu, Kelantan
20:45 UTC+8	Gilmar (yellow card) 62'; Fakri (yellow card) 90+3'	Report	Hazrul 15' (o.g.); Andik (yellow card) 42'; Bunyamin (yellow card) 60'; Azrif (yellow card) 72'; Raimi (yellow card) 86'	Stadium: Sultan Muhammad IV Stadium; Attendance: 3,500; Referee: Zamzaidi Katimin

17 October 2015 5	Selangor	2–1	T–Team	Shah Alam, Selangor
20:45 UTC+8	Andik 18'; Azrif (yellow card) 38'; Hazwan 72'	Report	Kamal (yellow card) 9' (yellow-red card) 90+1'; Zarulizwan 28'; Sadriddin (yellow card) 73'	Stadium: Shah Alam Stadium; Attendance: 5,010; Referee: Ahmad Zuhadi Dzulkifli

4 November 2015 6	FELDA United	3–2	Selangor	Selayang, Selangor
20:45 UTC+8	Thiago 49', 51'; Cornthwaite 65' (o.g.); Fauzan (yellow card) 88'	Report	Shazlan 31' de Paula 89'	Stadium: Selayang Stadium; Attendance: 1,886; Referee: Nazmi Nasaruddin

==== Quarter-finals ====
24 November 2015 First leg	Sarawak	1–2	Selangor	Kuching, Sarawak
20:45 UTC+8	Dzulazlan (yellow card) 38'; Mehmet 59'	Report	Hazwan 35' (yellow card) 68'; Afiq 89'	Stadium: Sarawak State Stadium; Attendance: 7,063; Referee: Ahmad Zuhadi Dzulkfli

28 November 2015 Second leg	Selangor	1–1 (3–2 agg.)	Sarawak	Shah Alam, Selangor
20:45 UTC+8	Afiq 28'	Report	Ashri 22'; Shreen (yellow card) 24' (yellow card) 86' (red card)	Stadium: Shah Alam Stadium; Attendance: 10,000; Referee: Syed Azhar Syed Kamar

==== Semi-finals ====
2 December 2015 First leg	Pahang	0–0	Selangor	Kuantan, Pahang
20:45 UTC+8	Nwakaeme (yellow card) 22'; Stewart (yellow card) 89'	Report	Raimi (yellow card) 34'; Andik (yellow card) 76'; Azrif (yellow card) 82'	Stadium: Darulmakmur Stadium; Attendance: 26,420; Referee: Syed Azhar Syed Kamar

6 December 2015 Second leg	Selangor	2–0 (2–0 agg.)	Pahang	Shah Alam, Selangor
20:45 UTC+8	de Paula 11'; Hadi (yellow card) 35'; Dos Santos (yellow card) 48'; Nazmi 54'	Report	Stewart (yellow card) 90+1'; Gopinathan (yellow card) 90+3'	Stadium: Shah Alam Stadium; Attendance: 47,436; Referee: Amirul Izwan Yaacob

==== Final ====
12 December 2015 Final	Selangor	2–0	Kedah	Shah Alam, Selangor
20:45 UTC+8	Hazwan 4', 48' (yellow card) 22'; Dos Santos (yellow card) 22'; Raimi (yellow card) 29'	Report	Shafizan (yellow card) 22'; Edeh (yellow card) 42'; Firdaus (red card) 83'	Stadium: Shah Alam Stadium; Attendance: 80,000; Referee: Nazmi Nasaruddin

== Statistics ==
=== Squad statistics ===
As of 12 December 2015

Appearances (Apps.) numbers are for appearances in competitive games only including sub appearances.
\ Red card numbers denote: Numbers in parentheses represent red cards overturned for wrongful dismissal.

No.	Nat.	Player	Pos.	Super League				FA Cup				Malaysia Cup				Total			
No.	Nat.	Player	Pos.	Apps	Goal	Booked	Sent off (straight red)	Apps	Goal	Booked	Sent off (straight red)	Apps	Goal	Booked	Sent off (straight red)	Apps	Goal	Booked	Sent off (straight red)
1	(Malaysia)	Syamim Othman	GK	8		1		2								10		1	
2	(Australia)	Robert Cornthwaite	DF	15	4	4		2		1		10				27	4	5	
3	(Malaysia)	Azmi Muslim	DF	9								2				11			
4	(Malaysia)	Shazlan Alias	DF									2	1			2	1		
5	(Malaysia)	Shahrom Kalam	DF	18	1	1		1				11		1		30	1	2	
6	(Malaysia)	S. Subramaniam	DF																
7	(Indonesia)	Andik Vermansyah	MF	22	6			1			1	11	1	2		34	7	2	1
8	(Brazil)	Leandro Dos Santos	MF	17	1	7	1	2		2		11		2		30	1	11	1
9	(Malaysia)	Thamil Arasu	FW	5		1						1				6		1	
10	(Malaysia)	Nazmi Faiz	MF	21	1	2	1	2				9	1			32	2	2	1
11	(Malaysia)	Hazwan Bakri	MF	22	7	2		2	1	1		9	4	3		33	12	6	
12	(Malaysia)	Bunyamin Umar	DF	12		1						6		2		18		3	
13	(Brazil)	Guilherme de Paula	FW	19	8	1		2	2	1		11	3	1		32	13	3	
14	(Malaysia)	Hadi Yahya	FW	20	4	1		2				11		1		33	4	2	
15	(Malaysia)	Raimi Mohd Nor	DF	13		1		2				10		3		25		4	
16	(Malaysia)	Saiful Ridzuwan	MF									2				2			
17	(Malaysia)	Rizal Fahmi	DF	14	1	2		1				3				18	1	2	
18	(Malaysia)	K. Thanaraj	MF									1				1			
19	(Malaysia)	Afiq Azmi	FW	20	8	2		2				6	2	1		28	10	3	
20	(Malaysia)	Azrif Nasrulhaq	DF	21		4		2				10		3		33		7	
21	(Malaysia)	Hamsani Ahmad	GK	6												6			
22	(Malaysia)	Norazlan Razali	GK	9		2		1				11				21		2	
23	(Malaysia)	S. Veenod	MF	11				1				7				19			
24	(Malaysia)	Fitri Shazwan	MF	8	1			1				4				13	1		
25	(Malaysia)	K. Gurusamy	MF	13	1	2		2				5		1		20	1	3	
Own goals					0				0				1				1		
Totals					43	34	2		3	5	1		13	20	0		59	59	3

=== Goalscorers ===
Includes all competitive matches.

As of match played 12 December 2015

Rank	Pos.	No.	Player	Super League	FA Cup	Malaysia Cup	Total
1	FW	13	(Brazil) Guilherme de Paula	8	2	3	13
2	MF	11	(Malaysia) Hazwan Bakri	7	1	4	12
3	FW	19	(Malaysia) Afiq Azmi	8	0	2	10
4	MF	7	(Indonesia) Andik Vermansyah	6	0	1	7
5	DF	2	(Australia) Robert Cornthwaite	4	0	0	4
5	FW	14	(Malaysia) Hadi Yahya	4	0	0	4
7	MF	10	(Malaysia) Nazmi Faiz	1	0	1	2
8	DF	4	(Malaysia) Shazlan Alias	0	0	1	1
8	DF	5	(Malaysia) Shahrom Kalam	1	0	0	1
8	MF	8	(Brazil) Leandro Dos Santos	1	0	0	1
8	DF	17	(Malaysia) Rizal Fahmi	1	0	0	1
8	DF	20	(Malaysia) Fitri Shazwan	1	0	0	1
8	DF	25	(Malaysia) K. Gurusamy	1	0	0	1
Own Goals				0	0	1	1
TOTALS				43	3	13	59
Own Goals Conceded
1	DF	2	(Australia) Robert Cornthwaite	0	1	1	2
TOTALS				0	1	1	2

=== Clean sheets ===
Rnk	No.	Player	Super League	FA Cup	Malaysia Cup	Total
1	22	(Malaysia) Norazlan Razali	2	0	6	8
2	1	(Malaysia) Syamim Othman	2	0	0	2
2	21	(Malaysia) Hamsani Ahmad	2	0	0	2
TOTALS			6	0	6	12

=== Disciplinary record ===
As of match played 12 December 2015

Rank	No.	Pos.	Name	Super League			FA Cup			Malaysia Cup			Total		
Rank	No.	Pos.	Name	Booked	(yellow card) (yellow-red card)	Sent off (straight red)	Booked	(yellow card) (yellow-red card)	Sent off (straight red)	Booked	(yellow card) (yellow-red card)	Sent off (straight red)	Booked	(yellow card) (yellow-red card)	Sent off (straight red)
1	8	MF	(Brazil) Leandro Dos Santos	7	1	-	2	-	-	2	-	-	11	1	-
2	20	DF	(Malaysia) Azrif Nasrulhaq	4	-	-	-	-	-	3	-	-	7	-	-
3	11	MF	(Malaysia) Hazwan Bakri	2	-	-	1	-	-	3	-	-	6	-	-
4	2	DF	(Australia) Robert Cornthwaite	4	-	-	1	-	-	-	-	-	5	-	-
5	15	DF	(Malaysia) Raimi Mohd Nor	1	-	-	-	-	-	3	-	-	4	-	-
6	12	DF	(Malaysia) Bunyamin Umar	1	-	-	-	-	-	2	-	-	3	-	-
6	13	FW	(Brazil) Guilherme de Paula	1	-	-	1	-	-	1	-	-	3	-	-
6	19	MF	(Malaysia) Afiq Azmi	2	-	-	-	-	-	1	-	-	3	-	-
6	25	MF	(Malaysia) K. Gurusamy	2	-	-	-	-	-	1	-	-	3	-	-
10	5	DF	(Malaysia) Shahrom Kalam	1	-	-	-	-	-	1	-	-	2	-	-
10	7	MF	(Indonesia) Andik Vermansyah	-	-	-	-	-	1	2	-	-	2	-	1
10	10	MF	(Malaysia) Nazmi Faiz	2	-	1	-	-	-	-	-	-	2	-	1
10	14	FW	(Malaysia) Hadi Yahya	1	-	-	-	-	-	1	-	-	2	-	-
10	17	DF	(Malaysia) Rizal Fahmi	2	-	-	-	-	-	-	-	-	2	-	-
10	22	GK	(Malaysia) Norazlan Razali	2	-	-	-	-	-	-	-	-	2	-	-
16	1	GK	(Malaysia) Syamim Othman	1	-	-	-	-	-	-	-	-	1	-	-
16	9	FW	(Malaysia) A. Thamil Arasu	1	-	-	-	-	-	-	-	-	1	-	-
Total				34	1	1	5	0	1	20	0	0	59	1	2
