= List of Malaysian football transfers 2011 =

This is a list of Malaysian football transfers for the 2011 transfer window. Moves featuring Malaysia Super League, Malaysia Premier League and Malaysia FAM Cup club are listed.

The first transfer window began once clubs had concluded their final domestic fixture of the 2010 season. The transfer window closed on 15 December 2010.

== 2011 First Transfers ==
All clubs without a flag are Malaysian. Otherwise it will be stated.

=== Transfers ===
Date	Name	Moving from	Moving to	Fee (Note: Transfer fees are gathered from the various and may not be exact)
1 January 2011	(Malaysia) Suhardy Alby	USM	Johor FC	Free
1 January 2011	(Malaysia) Radzi Jasman	Johor	Johor FC	Free
1 January 2011	(Malaysia) Irfan Ghani	Johor	Johor FC	Free
1 January 2011	(Malaysia) Rahman Zabul	Negeri Sembilan	Johor FC	Free
1 January 2011	(Malaysia) Badrul Khalid	Johor FC President	Johor FC	Free
1 January 2011	(Malaysia) Rezal Zambery	Negeri Sembilan	Johor FC	Free
1 January 2011	(Malaysia) Shahrizal Saad	Perak	Johor FC	Free
1 January 2011	(Malaysia) Wan Hoesne	PKNS	Johor FC	Free
1 January 2011	(Malaysia) Saudi Ibrahim	Felda United	Johor FC	Free
1 January 2011	(Malaysia) Wan Rohaimi	Johor FC	Kelantan	Free
1 January 2011	(Malaysia) Azwan Roya	Johor FC	Kelantan	Free
1 January 2011	(Malaysia) Aziz Ismail	PLUS	Kelantan	Free
1 January 2011	(Malaysia) Nicholas Chan	(England) Cardiff City Academy	Kelantan	Free
1 January 2011	(Malaysia) Zamri Ramli	Kelantan President	Kelantan	Free
1 January 2011	(Malaysia) Solehin Kanasian	Perlis	Kelantan	Free
1 January 2011	(Malaysia) Danial Fadzly Abdullah	ATM	Kelantan	Free
1 January 2011	(Malaysia) Khalid Jamlus	ATM	Kelantan	Free
1 January 2011	(Malaysia) Azidan Sarudin	Kuala Lumpur	Selangor	Free
1 January 2011	(Malaysia) Shahrudin Yakup	Kuala Lumpur	Felda United	Free
1 January 2011	(Malaysia) Raimi Mohd Nor	Kuala Lumpur	Felda United	Free
1 January 2011	(Malaysia) Jeremy Danker	Kuala Lumpur	Sabah	Free
1 January 2011	(Malaysia) Syazwan Rani	Kuala Lumpur	Unattached	Free
1 January 2011	(Malaysia) Nazrin Nawi	PLUS	Kuala Lumpur	Free
1 January 2011	(Malaysia) Norismaidham Ismail	Felda United	Kuala Lumpur	Free
1 January 2011	(Malaysia) Azmi Sarmin	Johor	Kuala Lumpur	Free
1 January 2011	(Malaysia) Afiq Azmi	Tambun Tulang	Kuala Lumpur	Free
1 January 2011	(Malaysia) Fahrul Razi	UiTM	Kuala Lumpur	Free

=== Loans ===
Players were loaned for Malaysia Cup matches only.

Date	Name	Moving from	Moving to
1 September 2011	(Malaysia) S. Sivanesan	Harimau Muda A	Felda United
1 September 2011	(Malaysia) K. Ravindran	Harimau Muda A	Felda United
1 September 2011	(Malaysia) D. Saarvindran	Harimau Muda B	Felda United
1 September 2011	(Malaysia) Redzuan Nawi	USM	Johor
1 September 2011	(Malaysia) Ashadi Yusoff	ATM	Johor
1 September 2011	(Malaysia) Noraslan Makhtar	Penang	Johor
1 September 2011	(Malaysia) Akhmal Mohd Nor	USM	Johor FC
1 September 2011	(Malaysia) Saiful Nizam	Pahang	Johor FC
1 September 2011	(Malaysia) Azamuddin Akil	Pahang	Kelantan
1 September 2011	(Malaysia) R. Surendran	Pahang	Kelantan
1 September 2011	(Malaysia) Azmizi Azmi	Perlis	Kedah
1 September 2011	(Malaysia) Bashahrul Abu Bakar	Harimau Muda A	Kedah
1 September 2011	(Malaysia) Hafiszuan Salehuddin	Perlis	Perak
1 September 2011	(Malaysia) Failee Ghazli	USM	Perak
1 September 2011	(Malaysia) Rafiuddin Roddin	Harimau Muda A	Perak
1 September 2011	(Malaysia) Fariss Azlan	USM	Sabah
1 September 2011	(Malaysia) Chun Keng Hong	ATM	Sarawak
1 September 2011	(Malaysia) Jaganathan Victor Arputharajoo	ATM	Sarawak
1 September 2011	(Malaysia) Nazri Ahmad	Harimau Muda A	Selangor
1 September 2011	(Malaysia) Haziq Zikri Elias	Harimau Muda A	Selangor
1 September 2011	(Malaysia) G. Jeevananthan	USM	Selangor
1 September 2011	(Malaysia) C. Premnath	Penang	Sime Darby
1 September 2011	(Malaysia) S. Thinakaran	USM	Sime Darby
1 September 2011	(Malaysia) Yusaini Hafiz Che Saad	ATM	Sime Darby
1 September 2011	(Malaysia) Faizal Muhammad	Harimau Muda A	Terengganu
1 September 2011	(Malaysia) Jibrail Kamaron Baharin	POS Malaysia	T–Team
1 September 2011	(Malaysia) Fitri Omar	Muar	T–Team
1 September 2011	(Malaysia) Munir Amran	Pahang	Negeri Sembilan

=== Unattached Players ===
Date	Name	New Club
