= 2010 Kuala Lumpur FA season =

Kuala Lumpur
2010 season
- Head Coach: Razip Ismail
- Super League: 9th
- FA Cup: Round of 16
- Malaysia Cup: Group Stage

The 2010 season was the 32nd season in Kuala Lumpur's existence, and their second consecutive year in the top flight of Malaysian football.

Kuala Lumpur finished ninth in the Malaysian Super League in the year following promotion from the Malaysian Premier League and reached the second round of the Malaysian FA Cup in season 2010. KL qualified for the Malaysia Cup where they ended bottom of Group B in the first round.

== Results and fixtures ==
=== Super League ===
| 9 January 2010 Match 1 | Kuala Lumpur | 1 – 1 | Kuala Terengganu T-Team | KLFA Stadium, Cheras |
| 20:45 | Azidan (yellow card) 18'; Raimi 41'; Farid (yellow card) 69' | | (yellow card) 38' Hadi; 76' Haris | Attendance: 350; Referee: Rosdi Shahrul |

| 12 January 2010 Match 2 | Selangor | 4 – 2 | Kuala Lumpur | Shah Alam |
| 20:45 | Safee 35'; Liew (yellow card) 43'; Amri 59'; R Surendren 78', 89'; Amri (yellow card) 85' | | 7' Yong; (yellow card) 62' Danker | Attendance: 3,000; Referee: S. Shittaranjanan |

| 16 January 2010 Match 3 | Kuala Lumpur | 0 – 0 | Negeri Sembilan | KLFA Stadium, Cheras |
| 20:45 | | | (yellow card) 90' Shukor | Attendance: 1,300; Referee: R. Krishnan |

| 19 January 2010 Match 4 | Johor FC | 0 – 1 | Kuala Lumpur | JCorp Stadium, Pasir Gudang |
| 20:45 | Izwan (yellow card) 52'; Khairul (yellow card) 72' | | 18' Yong; (yellow card) 68' Farid; (yellow card) 69' See; (yellow card) 80' Syafiq; (yellow card) 90+2' Remezey |

| 23 January 2010 Match 5 | KL PLUS FC | 0 – 0 | Kuala Lumpur | MBPJ Stadium, Petaling Jaya |
| 20:45 | Azi (yellow card) 15'; Zaidi (yellow card) 42' | | (yellow card) 82' Fitri | Attendance: 300; Referee: S. Sitharajan |

| 26 January 2010 Match 6 | Kuala Lumpur | 1 – 1 | Pahang | KLFA Stadium, Cheras |
| 20:45 | See (yellow card) 75'; Badrul 85'; Hazwan (yellow card) 90+1' | | 9' (yellow card) 76' Azamuddin; (yellow card) 33' R. Surendran | Attendance: 350; Referee: Samsudin Ibrahim |

| 30 January 2010 Match 7 | Terengganu | 2 – 0 | Kuala Lumpur | Sultan Ismail Nasiruddin Shah Stadium, Kuala Terengganu |
| 20:45 | Zairo 2'; Joseph (yellow card) 13'; Muhaimin (red card) 54'; Marzuki (yellow card) 66'; Helmi (yellow card) 71'; Ashaari 90' | Report | (yellow card) 73' Hazwan |

| 6 March 2010 Match 8 | Kuala Lumpur | 2 – 1 | Johor | KLFA Stadium, Cheras |
| 20:45 | Ismail 7' (o.g.); Farid (yellow card) 77'; Azwan (yellow card) 78'; Azidan 81' | | 70' L. Rajesh; (yellow card) 71' Radzi; (yellow card) 77' Rosaiful | Attendance: 100; Referee: Sew Tian Hu |

| 13 March 2010 Match 9 | Perlis | 0 – 2 | Kuala Lumpur | Utama Stadium, Kangar |
| 20:45 | | | 27' Shahrudin; 33' Badrul |

| 17 April 2010 Match 10 | Kuala Lumpur | 0 – 2 | Kedah | KLFA Stadium, Cheras |
| 20:45 | | | 22' Shafiq; (yellow card) 50' Azmi; 70' V. Thirumurugan | Attendance: 1,500; Referee: Syed Mohdar Syeiyed Aidarus |

| 20 April 2010 Match 11 | Kelantan | 3 – 0 | Kuala Lumpur | Sultan Mohammad IV Stadium, Kota Bharu |
| 20:45 | Norshahrul 19', 23'; Badri 48'; Shakir (yellow card) 77' | | (yellow card) 18' Fitri; (yellow card) 66' Kamarulzaman | Attendance: 20,000 |

| 24 April 2010 Match 12 | Kuala Lumpur | 2 – 1 | Perak | KLFA Stadium, Cheras |
| 20:45 | Raimi 4'; Syafiq (yellow card) 15'; Badrul 49'; Farid (yellow card) 78' | | 82' Nazri Kamal | Attendance: 700; Referee: Sani Tari |

| 4 May 2010 Match 13 | Penang | 1 – 0 | Kuala Lumpur | Batu Kawan |
| 20:45 | Nur Adli (yellow card) 4'; S. Veenod (yellow card) 56'; Failee Ghazli 68'; Zainuddin (yellow card) 87'; Chun (yellow card) 90+3' | | (yellow card) 69' Azidan |

| 8 May 2010 Match 14 | Kuala Lumpur | 2 – 0 | Penang | KLFA Stadium, Cheras |
| 20:45 | Hazwan 7', 71' | | (yellow card) 68' Wazir; (yellow card) 70' Idzwan | Attendance: 250; Referee: Rosdi Shaharul |

| 15 May 2010 Match 15 | Kuala Terengganu T-Team | 1 – 0 | Kuala Lumpur | Sultan Ismail Nasiruddin Shah Stadium, Kuala Terengganu |
| 20:45 | Shahrul Ezrain 34' |

| 18 May 2010 Match 16 | Kuala Lumpur | 2 – 4 | Selangor | KLFA Stadium, Cheras |
| 20:45 | Raimi 47', 68' (pen.); Farid (yellow card) 44' | | 8' Liew; 66', 74' Amri; 90+3' Safiq | Attendance: 1,000; Referee: Subkhidin Salleh |

| 22 May 2010 Match 17 | Negeri Sembilan | 1 – 2 | Kuala Lumpur | Tuanku Abdul Rahman Stadium, Paroi |
| 20:45 | Shukor Adan 40' | | 16' Azidan; 58' Farouk |

| 25 May 2010 Match 18 | Kuala Lumpur | 0 – 0 | Johor FC | KLFA Stadium, Cheras |
| 20:45 | Shahrudin (yellow card) 55'; Syafiq (yellow card) 71' | | (yellow card) 7' Mat Saiful; (yellow card) 55' Nurul Azuan; (yellow card) 64' Azizan; (red card) 71' Eddy Helmi | Attendance: 300; Referee: Sani Tari |

| 29 May 2010 Match 19 | Kuala Lumpur | 1 – 1 | Terengganu | KLFA Stadium, Cheras |
| 20:45 | Badrul 69' (pen.) | | 52' Ashaari; (yellow card) 69' Hariri; (yellow card) 73' Shahrizam | Attendance: 500; Referee: Sew Tian Hu |

| 1 June 2010 Match 20 | Pahang | 1 – 0 | Kuala Lumpur | Darulmakmur Stadium, Kuantan |
| 20:45 | Azamuddin 64' |

| 6 July 2010 Match 21 | Kedah | 0 – 0 | Kuala Lumpur | Darul Aman Stadium, Alor Star |
| 20:45 | | | (yellow card) 20' Azwan; (yellow card) 37' Dashila; (yellow card) 41' Farouk; (yellow card) 83' Syafiq; (yellow card) 90+1' Norazlan |

| 10 July 2010 Match 22 | Kuala Lumpur | 1 – 1 | Perlis | KLFA Stadium, Cheras |
| 20:45 | Azidan (yellow card) 10'; Azwan 35'; Hazwan (red card) 76' | | (yellow card) 45+2' Syazwan Zainol; (yellow card) 52' Fakri; (yellow card) 71' (goal) 74' Aminuddin; (yellow card) 76' K. Soley | Attendance: 100; Referee: S. Sittharanjanan |

| 17 July 2010 Match 23 | Kuala Lumpur | 0 – 2 | Kelantan | KLFA Stadium, Cheras |
| 20:45 | | Report | 29' Norfarhan; 63' Badhri | Attendance: 7,000; Referee: R. Krishnan |

| 28 July 2010 Match 24 | Perak | 0 – 1 | Kuala Lumpur | Perak Stadium, Ipoh |
| 20:45 | Wan Azwari (yellow card) 61'; Isma Alif (yellow card) 90+2' | | 37' See; (yellow card) 47' Jihad; (yellow card) 62' Azidan; (yellow card) 65' Danker; (yellow card) 88' Azwan |

| 31 July 2010 Match 25 | Kuala Lumpur | 0 – 2 | KL PLUS FC | KLFA Stadium, Cheras |
| 20:45 | Syafiq (yellow card) 51' (yellow-red card) 80' | | (yellow card) 19' Azi; (yellow card) 82' Lot; 85' Fadzli; 90'Lot |

| 3 August 2010 Match 26 | Johor | 0 – 1 | Kuala Lumpur | Larkin, Johor Bahru |
| 20:45 | Azhariridzuan (yellow card) 17'; Tuah Iskandar (yellow card) 56'; Fahian (yellow card) 77' | | 90+2' Badrul | Attendance: 100 |

=== FA Cup ===
| Round 1, Leg 1; 2 February 2010 | Kuala Lumpur | 3 – 1 | Johor | KLFA Stadium, Cheras |
| 20:45 | Azidan 38'; Khairul (yellow card) 54'; Hawzan 79'; Badrul 84' | | (yellow card) 5' Razdi; (yellow card) 34' Adib; 72' Azmi | Attendance: 100; Referee: Shokri Nor |

| Round 1, Leg 2; 6 February 2010 | Johor | 0 – 0 | Kuala Lumpur | Larkin, Johor Bahru |
| 20:45 | | | (yellow card) 82' Hazwan |

| Round 2, Leg 1; 16 February 2010 | KL PLUS FC | 3 – 0 | Kuala Lumpur | MBPJ Stadium, Petaling Jaya |
| 20:45 | Fadli 4'; Aziz 56'; Sanjos 74' | | | Attendance: 80; Referee: Saiful Baharin Hassan |

| Round 2, Leg 2; 20 February 2010 | Kuala Lumpur | 1 – 1 | KL PLUS FC | KLFA Stadium, Cheras |
| 20:45 | Azwan (yellow card) 20'; Raimi 26'; Shahrom (yellow card) 73' | | 52' Fadli; (yellow card) 38' Azi | Attendance: 100; Referee: Samsudin Ibrahim |

=== Malaysia Cup ===
| Round 1, Group B 14 September 2010 | Kuala Lumpur | 0 – 0 | Sabah | KLFA Stadium, Cheras |
| 20:45 | Farid (yellow card) 45+2'; Azmi (yellow card) 59' | | (yellow card) 84' Mafry; (yellow card) 86' Reithaudin | Attendance: 200; Referee: Nafeez Abd Wahab |

| Round 1, Group B 17 September 2010 | Pahang | Postponed | Kuala Lumpur | Darulmakmur Stadium, Kuantan |
| 20:45 | | Report | | Attendance: 400 |

| Round 1, Group B 20 September 2010 | Terengganu | 0 – 1 | Kuala Lumpur | Sultan Ismail Nasiruddin Shah Stadium, Kuala Terengganu |
| 20:45 | | | Sharbinee 64' (o.g.) | Attendance: 3,000; Referee: Suhaizi Shukri |

| Round 1, Group B 26 September 2010 | Pahang | 5 – 2 | Kuala Lumpur | KLFA Stadium, Cheras |
| 20:45 | Fazli 30'; Azamuddin 45+1'; Shahrizan (yellow card) 61'; R Karthigesu 64'; Saiful 70'; Nik Zul (yellow card) 75'; Famirul 85' | | (yellow card) 17' Azidan; 66' Badrul; 67' Hazwan | Attendance: 250; Referee: Zamzaidi Khatiman |

| Round 1, Group B 3 October 2010 | Sabah | 3 – 2 | Kuala Lumpur | Likas Stadium, Kota Kinabalu |
| 20:15 | Afif 5'; Zainizam 20'; Farid Ideris 90+1' | Report | 74' Badrul; 75' Azlan | Attendance: 5,000 |

| Round 1, Group B 6 October 2010 | Kuala Lumpur | 0 – 1 | Pahang | KLFA Stadium, Cheras |
| 20:45 | Dashila (yellow card) 75' | | 53' Faizol; (yellow card) 69' Nik Zul; (yellow card) 77' Fazli | Attendance: 250; Referee: Nafeez Abdul Wahab |

| Round 1, Group B 9 October 2010 | Kuala Lumpur | 1 – 2 | Terengganu | KLFA Stadium, Cheras |
| 20:45 | Badrul 47'; Arman (yellow card) 44' (yellow-red card) 53' | | 27' Marzuki; (yellow card) 54' Wan Aliff; 90+3' Ashaari | Attendance: 500; Referee: Anuar Che Hussin |

=== Friendly matches ===
Note: scores are written KL first.

Friendlies
| Date | Opponent | Venue | Result | KL Scorers | Opp Scorers |
|---|---|---|---|---|---|
| 12-12-2009 | (Malaysia) Negeri Sembilan | Paroi | 0–0 | | |
| 15-12-2009 | (Malaysia) Kedah | TNB Bangsar | 2–1 | Farouk, Raimi | ?? |
| 16-12-2009 | (Malaysia) PKNS FC | Kelana jaya | 1–2 | Azwan | ?? |
| 17-12-2009 | Pos Malaysia FC | | 1–1 | ?? | ?? |
| 26-12-2009 | (Malaysia) Johor FC | Cheras | 0–0 | | |
| 29-12-2009 | (Malaysia) Sarawak | Cheras | 0–0^{*} | | |
| 02-01-2010 | (Malaysia) Young Tigers | Cheras | 3–3 | Badrul 5', Khairul 85', Hazwan 88' | Zaharulnizam 25', Thamil Arasu 52', 70' |
| 05-01-2010 | (Malaysia) Armed Forces | Cheras | 1–2 | Fahruzzahar 77' | Zainal 45', Shazrin 71' |
| 27-02-2010 | (Malaysia) UiTM FC | Cheras | 2–1 | Fahruzzahar, See | ?? |
| 22-03-2010 | (Malaysia) Young Tigers | Cheras | 0–1 | | Irfan Fazail 90' |
| 03-04-2010 | (Malaysia) Army | Cheras | 4–2 | Hazwan 17', 33', Badrul 38', Mugilan 85' | Puniraj 47', Runi Ayub 77' |
| 06-04-2010 | (Malaysia) Maybank FC | Bangi | 6–0 | See 9', 51', Syafiq 25', Badrul 52', Shahrudin 76', 85' | |
| 10-04-2010 | Pos Malaysia FC | Cheras | 1–1 | Raimi | ?? |
| 13-04-2010 | (Malaysia) MDT | Cheras | 4–0 | K. Mugilan 21', Raimi 49', 63', 69' | |
| 01-05-2010 | (Malaysia) Titiwangsa FC | Cheras | 0–2 | | ?? |
| 22-06-2010 | (Malaysia) Negeri Sembilan | Paroi | 2–2 | See, Khairul | Shahurain,, Sani-GK (red card) |
| 27-06-2010 | (Malaysia) PKNS FC | Cheras | 1–5 | Raimi 3' | Fadhil 31', Alafi 47', Akhyar 76', 85', P Rajesh 90' |
| 29-06-2010 | (Malaysia) Selangor | Cheras | 2–0 | Raimi 52', Azidan 69' | |
| 02-07-2010 | (Malaysia) USM FC | Cheras | 3–2 | Raimi, Badrul, | ?? |
| 20-08-2010 | (Malaysia) Muar Municipal Council FC | Cheras | 2–0 | Badrul 19', Azwan 30' | |
| 23-08-2010 | (Malaysia) Public Service Commission | Cheras | 4–1 | Azmi,, Syafiq, OG | ? |
| 25-08-2010 | (Malaysia) KL PLUS FC | Cheras | 2–0 | Azwan 10', Farouk 43' | |
| 28-08-2010 | (Malaysia) PKNS FC | Kelana Jaya | 0–0 | | |
| 31-08-2010 | (Malaysia) Selangor | Cheras | 3–1 | Azmi 2' 18', Hazwan 57' | Amirulhadi Zainal 50' |
| 04-09-2010 | (Malaysia) Negeri Sembilan | Paroi | 0–1 | | Rezal Zambery Yahya 72' |
| 07-09-2010 | (Malaysia) Felda United FC | Cheras | 2–3 | Farouk 13', Fahruzzahar 84' (pen.) | Hasmawi 11' (pen.), Kamarul Afiq 61', Khairul Izwan 86' |
| 26-10-2010 | Western Australia Amateur Selection | Cheras | 4–1 | Azlan 13', Fahruzzahar 45', Afiq Azmi 64', Khairul 85' | 90' |

^{*}Match abandoned at half-time due to heavy rain

== Table ==
=== Malaysia Super League ===
| Pos | Team | Pld | W | D | L | GF | GA | GD | Pts | Qualification or relegation |
|---|---|---|---|---|---|---|---|---|---|---|
| 7 | T–Team | 26 | 10 | 8 | 8 | 33 | 26 | +7 | 38 | |
| 8 | Pahang | 26 | 10 | 3 | 13 | 31 | 50 | −19 | 33 | |
| 9 | Kuala Lumpur | 26 | 8 | 8 | 10 | 20 | 29 | −9 | 32 | |
| 10 | PLUS | 26 | 8 | 6 | 12 | 29 | 29 | 0 | 30 | Withdrawal from Liga Super (Note: PLUS withdrew from Liga Super before the start of 2011 season.) |
| 11 | Perak | 26 | 8 | 6 | 12 | 25 | 30 | −5 | 30 | |

Source: Results TM Liga Super
Rules for classification: 1) points; 2) goal difference; 3) number of goals scored.

=== Malaysia Cup Group B ===
| Pos | Team | Pld | W | D | L | GF | GA | GD | Pts |
|---|---|---|---|---|---|---|---|---|---|
| 1 | Terengganu FA (A) | 6 | 3 | 1 | 2 | 10 | 7 | +3 | 10 |
| 2 | Pahang FA (A) | 6 | 3 | 1 | 2 | 10 | 8 | +2 | 10 |
| 3 | Sabah FA | 6 | 2 | 3 | 1 | 8 | 8 | 0 | 9 |
| 4 | Kuala Lumpur FA | 6 | 1 | 1 | 4 | 6 | 10 | −4 | 4 |

(A) Advanced to knockout stage

== Squad statistics ==
Only lists players who made an appearance or were on the bench.

| Player | Nat | Pos | Starts | As substitute | Total appearances | Super League G | Malaysia Cup G | FA Cup G | Total G |
|---|---|---|---|---|---|---|---|---|---|
| Badrul Hisyam Azmi | (Malaysia) | FW | 22 | 7 | 29 | 5 | 3 | 1 | 9 |
| Raimi Md Nor | (Malaysia) | MF | 23 | 6 | 29 | 4 | 0 | 1 | 5 |
| Ahmad Hazwan Bakri | (Malaysia) | FW | 11 | 16 | 27 | 2 | 1 | 1 | 4 |
| Azidan Sarudin | (Malaysia) | MF | 33 | 1 | 34 | 2 | 0 | 1 | 3 |
| Yong Kuong Yong | (Malaysia) | MF | 15 | 6 | 21 | 2 | 0 | 0 | 2 |
| Azwan Abdul Malek | (Malaysia) | MF | 19 | 3 | 22 | 1 | 0 | 0 | 1 |
| Farouk Hashim | (Malaysia) | DF | 20 | 1 | 21 | 1 | 0 | 0 | 1 |
| Shahrudin Yakup | (Malaysia) | MF | 13 | 6 | 19 | 1 | 0 | 0 | 1 |
| See Kok Luen | (Malaysia) | MF | 14 | 4 | 18 | 1 | 0 | 0 | 1 |
| Ahmad Azlan Zainal | (Malaysia) | DF | 7 | 2 | 9 | 0 | 1 | 0 | 1 |
| Ahmad Dashila Tajudin | (Malaysia) | DF | 30 | 1 | 31 | 0 | 0 | 0 | 0 |
| Syafiq Johari | (Malaysia) | MF | 22 | 7 | 29 | 0 | 0 | 0 | 0 |
| Farid Ramli | (Malaysia) | DF | 24 | 2 | 26 | 0 | 0 | 0 | 0 |
| Shahrom Abdul Kalam | (Malaysia) | DF | 23 | 2 | 25 | 0 | 0 | 0 | 0 |
| Syazmin Firdaus Aminuddin | (Malaysia) | MF | 16 | 4 | 20 | 0 | 0 | 0 | 0 |
| Norazlan Razali | (Malaysia) | GK | 19 | 0 | 19 | 0 | 0 | 0 | 0 |
| Khairul Anuar Shafie | (Malaysia) | FW | 8 | 8 | 16 | 0 | 0 | 0 | 0 |
| Remezey Che Ros | (Malaysia) | GK | 15 | 0 | 15 | 0 | 0 | 0 | 0 |
| Fahruzzahar Ali | (Malaysia) | FW | 10 | 5 | 15 | 0 | 0 | 0 | 0 |
| Jeremy Matthew Danker | (Malaysia) | DF | 13 | 1 | 14 | 0 | 0 | 0 | 0 |
| Kamarulzaman Mahamud | (Malaysia) | DF | 11 | 1 | 12 | 0 | 0 | 0 | 0 |
| Fitri Jamaludin | (Malaysia) | DF | 9 | 2 | 11 | 0 | 0 | 0 | 0 |
| Ahmad Jihad Ismail | (Malaysia) | DF | 2 | 9 | 11 | 0 | 0 | 0 | 0 |
| Arman Fareez Ali | (Malaysia) | DF | 5 | 2 | 7 | 0 | 0 | 0 | 0 |
| S Sivaraj | (Malaysia) | FW | 2 | 5 | 7 | 0 | 0 | 0 | 0 |
| Azmi Sarmin | (Malaysia) | FW | 5 | 0 | 5 | 0 | 0 | 0 | 0 |
| Dzaiddin Zainudin | (Malaysia) | DF | 3 | 0 | 3 | 0 | 0 | 0 | 0 |
| Zahid Ahmad | (Malaysia) | GK | 2 | 0 | 2 | 0 | 0 | 0 | 0 |
| Dzurrun Salam Ismail | (Malaysia) | MF | 0 | 2 | 2 | 0 | 0 | 0 | 0 |
| Afiq Akmal Zunaidi | (Malaysia) | MF | 0 | 1 | 1 | 0 | 0 | 0 | 0 |
| Saddam Hussein Abdul Rahman | (Malaysia) | MF | 0 | 1 | 1 | 0 | 0 | 0 | 0 |
| Hazwan Rahman | (Malaysia) | MF | 0 | 0 | 0 | 0 | 0 | 0 | 0 |
| Razid Gafar | (Malaysia) | DF | 0 | 0 | 0 | 0 | 0 | 0 | 0 |
| Syazwan Rani | (Malaysia) | DF | 0 | 0 | 0 | 0 | 0 | 0 | 0 |
| Own goal | | | - | - | - | 1 | 1 | 0 | 2 |

== Transfers ==
=== In ===
| Pos | Player | From | Fee | Date |
|---|---|---|---|---|
| DF | (Malaysia) Mohd Syazwan Mohd Rani | Academy | Free | December 2009 |
| FW | (Malaysia) S Sivaraj | Academy | Free | December 2009 |
| FW | (Malaysia) Fahruzzahar Ali | (Malaysia) Johor FC | Free | December 2009 |
| FW | (Malaysia) See Kok Luen | (Malaysia) Johor FC | Free | December 2009 |
| DF | (Malaysia) Farid Ramli | (Malaysia) Johor FC | Free | December 2009 |
| DF | (Malaysia) Farouk Hashim | (Malaysia) Felda United FC | Free | December 2009 |
| DF | (Malaysia) Fitri Jamaluddin | (Malaysia) Kuala Muda Naza FC | Free | December 2009 |
| DF | (Malaysia) Jeremy Matthew Danker | (Malaysia) UPB-MyTeam FC | Free | December 2009 |
| FW | (Malaysia) Khairul Anuar Shafie | (Malaysia) Titiwangsa FC | Free | December 2009 |
| FW | (Malaysia) Mohd Raimi Md Nor | (Malaysia) KL PLUS FC | Free | December 2009 |
| GK | (Malaysia) Remezey Che Ros | (Malaysia) Pahang | Free | December 2009 |
| GK | (Malaysia) Norazalan Razali | (Malaysia) Johor | Free | December 2009 |
| DF | (Malaysia) Dzurrun Salam Ismail | Academy | Free | May 2009 |
| MF | (Malaysia) Afiq Akmal Zunaidi | Academy | Free | May 2009 |
| DF | (Malaysia) Ahmad Azlan Zainal | (Malaysia) Kelantan | Free | May 2009 |
| FW | (Malaysia) Azmi Sarmin | (Malaysia) Johor | Loan | September 2009 |
| DF | (Malaysia) Dzaiddin Zainudin | Academy | Free | October 2009 |
| MF | (Malaysia) Saddam Hussein Abdul Rahman | Academy | Free | October 2009 |

=== Out ===
| Pos | Player | To | Fee | Date |
|---|---|---|---|---|
| FW | (Malaysia) Abdul Hadi Yahya | (Malaysia) Kuala Terengganu T-Team | Free | November 2009 |
| DF | (Malaysia) Hishamuddin Othman | (Malaysia) Johor | Free | November 2009 |
| DF | (Malaysia) Khairi Zainudin | (Malaysia) PKNS FC | Free | November 2009 |
| GK | (Malaysia) Saiful Anuar Sudar | (Malaysia) PKNS FC | Free | November 2009 |
| DF | (Malaysia) Ahmad Nurfaizal Patrick Abdullah | (Malaysia) Felda United FC | Loan return | November 2009 |
| DF | (Malaysia) Farouk Hashim | (Malaysia) Felda United FC | Loan return | November 2009 |
| MF | (Malaysia) Norismaidham Ismail | (Malaysia) Felda United FC | Loan return | November 2009 |
| DF | (Malaysia) Anwar Ridhwan Rahim | | released | November 2009 |
| MF | (Malaysia) Demas Duon Lusong | | released | November 2009 |
| MF | (Malaysia) Hairy Azly Mahamad | | released | November 2009 |
| MF | (Malaysia) Ihsan Ibrahim Daud | | released | November 2009 |
| MF | (Malaysia) Shah Irwan Shahdan | | released | November 2009 |
| MF | (Malaysia) Hafzairi Azmi | (Malaysia) Titiwangsa FC | Free | November 2009 |
| GK | (Malaysia) Ishar Haslan Ismail | (Malaysia) Kuala Lumpur City Hall | Free | November 2009 |
| DF | (Malaysia) Saiful Nizam Saad | (Malaysia) Maybank FC | Free | November 2009 |
| FW | (Malaysia) Shuhaimi Shuib | (Malaysia) Maybank FC | Free | November 2009 |
| DF | (Malaysia) Zulkifli Sulaiman | (Malaysia) Sime Darby FC | Free | November 2009 |
