= 2015 Kelantan FA season =

Kelantan FA
2015 season
- President: Annuar Musa
- Head coach: George Boateng (until 24 March 2015); Mohd Azraai Khor Abdullah (until 4 July 2015); Zahasmi Ismail (starting 4 July 2015)
- Stadium: Sultan Muhammad IV Stadium (capacity:22,000)
- Malaysia Super League: 9th
- Malaysia FA Cup: Runner Up
- Malaysia Cup: Group Stage
- Top goalscorer: League: Gilmar (6); Nor Farhan Muhammad (6); All: Gilmar (11)
- Highest home attendance: 19,500; Kelantan FA 0-4 PDRM FA (21 February 2015)
- Lowest home attendance: 3,512; Kelantan FA 1-2 Terengganu FA (8 August 2015)
Home colours	Away colours

The 2015 season was Kelantan FA's 7th season in the Malaysia Super League and 20th successive season in the top flight of Malaysian football league system. They will also compete in FA Cup and Malaysia Cup. For the first time since 2012, they will not compete in AFC Cup.

== Friendlies ==
=== Pre-season ===
Date	Opponents	H / A	Result F–A	Scorers	Attendance	Notes
7 Jan 2015	(Terengganu) T–Team F.C.	A	2—2	Izuan Rosli, Carrillo		Charity match for flood victims
13 Jan 2015	Terengganu FA	A	0—0			Friendly match
17 Jan 2015	(Thailand) Songkhla United F.C.	A	2—3	Noor Hazrul, Wan Zaharulnizam, Emmanuel Kenmogne		Friendly match
21 Jan 2015	(Malaysia) Sungai Ara F.C.	A	1—5	Wan Zack Haikal, Erwin Carrillo(2), Nor Farhan Muhammad		Friendly match
23 Jan 2015	(Penang) Pulau Pinang FA	A	2—0			Friendly match
26 Jan 2015	Kedah FA	A	3—1	Erwin Carrillo		Friendly match

=== During season ===
Date	Opponents	H / A	Result F–A	Scorers	Attendance	Notes
14 June 2015	(Terengganu) T–Team F.C.	H	2—2	Austin Amutu(2)		Friendly match(The match was called off after 60 minutes after one of T–Team F.C. player, David Oniya collapsed and confirmed die on-pitch
9 June 2015	(Negeri Sembilan) NS Matrix F.C.	A	3—3	Austin Amutu(2), Ahmad Fakri Saarani		Friendly match

=== After season ===
Date	Opponents	H / A	Result F–A	Scorers	Attendance	Notes
17 Oct 2015	Terengganu FA	H	2—2	Ahmad Fakri Saarani, Jonathan McKain		Malaysia Cup Friendly match

== Competition ==
Win Draw Loss Postponed

=== Super League ===
The league will kick-off on 31 January 2015.

Date	Opponents	H / A	Result F–A	Scorers	Attendance	League position	Notes
7 Feb 2015	(Malaysia) ATM	A	2—0	Noor Hazrul 14', Erwin Carrillo 62'	6,000	3rd	Kelantan played with 10 players during 2nd half after 3rd substitute Brendan Gan sustained injury. (yellow card) Nik Shahrul Azim Abdul Halim; (yellow card) Mohd Farisham Ismail; (yellow card) Wan Zaharulnizam Zakaria; (yellow card) Erwin Carrillo
15 Feb 2015	(Singapore) Lions XII	H	2—0	McKain 6' Piya 42'	18,000	▲1st	Match postponed from 14th Jan 2015 to 15th Jan 2015. (yellow card) Noor Hazrul Mustafa
21 Feb 2015	(Malaysia) PDRM	H	0—4		19,500	▼5th	(yellow card) Mohd Fitri Omar; (yellow card) Jonathan McKain; (yellow card) Wan Zaharulnizam Zakaria; (yellow card) Ahmad Fakri Saarani
7 Mar 2015	(Malaysia) Perak	A	0—0		20,000	5th	(yellow card) Noor Hazrul Mustafa; (yellow card) Erwin Carrillo
14 Mar 2015	(Malaysia) Felda United	H	0—1		19,000	▼7th	(yellow card) Erwin Carrillo
4 Apr 2015	(Malaysia) Terengganu	A	1—2	Piya 76'	7,330	▼8th	(yellow card) Mohd Nor Farhan Muhammad
11 Apr 2015	(Malaysia) Pahang	H	0—2		7,000	▼10th	(yellow card) Mohd Nor Farhan Muhammad; (yellow card) Nik Shahrul Azim Abdul Halim
18 Apr 2015	(Malaysia) JDT	A	1—3	Amutu 10'	21,100	10th	(yellow card) Mohd Khairul Izuan Rosli; (yellow card) Ahmad Fakri Saarani
25 Apr 2015	(Malaysia) Selangor	H	2—1	Gilmar 5' Farhan 74'	8,517	▲9th	(yellow card) Jonathan McKain; (yellow card) Norhafiz Zamani Misbah; (yellow card) Mohd Farisham Ismail; (yellow card) Austin Amutu; (yellow card) Khairul Fahmi Che Mat
2 May 2015	(Malaysia) Sarawak	A	2—3	Erwin Carrillo 17' Kechik 85'	4,500	▼10th	(yellow card) Wan Zaharulnizam
23 June 2015	(Malaysia) Sime Darby	A	1—1	Gilmar 90'	2,250	10th	(yellow card) Jonathan McKain; (yellow card) Wan Zack Haikal; (yellow card) Fitri Omar; (yellow card) Amiridzwan Taj
4 July 2015	(Singapore) LionsXII	A	0—3		3,587	10th	(yellow card) Wan Zaharulnizam; (yellow card) Nik Shahrul Azim; (yellow card) Nor Farhan Muhammad; (yellow card) Farisham Ismail
8 July 2015m	(Malaysia) PDRM	A	3—1	Austin Amutu 5' Jonathan McKain 45' Erwin Carrillo 66'	2,000	▲9th	(yellow card) Jonathan McKain; (yellow card) Fitri Omar
25 July 2015	(Malaysia) Sime Darby F.C.	H	2-2	Amirizdwan Taj Tajuddin 6' Gilmar Jose da Silva Filho 73'	8,750	9th	(yellow card) Gilmar Jose da Silva Filho; (yellow card) Wan Zaharulnizam; (yellow card) Zairul Fitree
28 July 2015	(Malaysia) ATM FA	H	5-1	Erwin Carrillo 3' 63' Wan Zack Haikal 38' Nor Farhan Muhammad 41' Wan Zaharulnizam Zakaria 74'	8,220	9th	(yellow card) Gilmar Jose da Silva Filho
1 August 2015	(Malaysia) Perak FA	H	1-0	Wan Zack Haikal 73'	6,343	9th	(yellow card) Austin Amutu; (red card) Nor Farhan Muhammad
5 August 2015	(Malaysia) Felda United F.C.	A	0-0		2,467	9th	(yellow card) Fakri Saarani; (yellow card) Amirizdwan Taj Tajuddin; (yellow card) Norhafiz Zamani Misbah
8 August 2015	(Malaysia) Terengganu FA	H	1-2	Ahmad Fakri Saarani 2'	3,512	9th	(yellow card) Amirizdwan Taj Tajuddin; (yellow card) Fitri Omar
12 August 2015	(Malaysia) Pahang FA	A	5-3	Nor Farhan Muhammad 12' 70' 90'	9,097	9th	(yellow card) Wan Zack Haikal; (red card) Khairul Izuan Rosli
15 August 2015	(Malaysia) Johor Darul Ta'zim F.C.	H	4-1	Gilmar 4' 82' Mohd Badhri Radzi 13' Nor Farhan Muhammad 51'	5,982	9th	(yellow card) Gilmar Jose da Silva Filho; (yellow card) Fitri Omar; (yellow card) Norhafiz Zamani Misbah; (yellow card) Austin Amutu
19 August 2015	(Malaysia) Selangor FA	A	0-3		9,686	9th	(yellow card) Jonathan McKain; (yellow card) Shahrizan Ismail; (yellow card) Erwin Carrillo
22 August 2015	(Malaysia) Sarawak FA	H	4-3	Noor Hazrul Mustafa 11' Mohd Khairul Izuan Rosli 45' Amutu 73' Gilmar 85'	3,872	9th	

Table

Pos	Team	Pld	W	D	L	GF	GA	GD	Pts	Qualification or relegation
7	LionsXII (Note: LionsXII are not eligible for any AFC competition spots)	22	9	6	7	36	32	+4	33	End of MOU saw club dissolved at the end of the season.
8	Perak	22	8	4	10	32	33	−1	28	
9	Kelantan	22	8	4	10	34	38	−4	28	
10	Sarawak	22	4	7	11	28	40	−12	19	
11	ATM (R)	22	2	5	15	21	47	−26	11	Qualification to the Relegation play-off

Source: FAM Official Site, Astro Arena
Rules for classification: 1) points; 2) goal difference; 3) number of goals scored
(R) Relegated
Notes:

Goal scorers for Super League

As of 22 August 2015

6 goals

- (Brazil) Gilmar Jose da Silva Filho
- (Malaysia) Mohd Nor Farhan Muhammad

5 goals

- (Colombia) Erwin Carrillo

3 goals

- (Malaysia) Mohd Badhri Mohd Radzi
- (Malaysia) Wan Zack Haikal
- (Nigeria) Austin Amutu

2 goals

- (Malaysia) Noor Hazrul Mustafa
- (Malaysia) Wan Zaharulnizam
- (Australia) Jonathan McKain

1 goal

- (Malaysia) Amirizdwan Taj Tajuddin
- (Malaysia) Mohd Khairul Izuan Rosli
- (Malaysia) Ahmad Fakri Saarani

=== FA Cup ===
The draw for the competition was made on 14 December 2014 with games expected to start in February 2015.

Date	Opponents	H / A	Result F–A	Scorers	Attendance	Notes
27 Feb 2015	(Malaysia) Sarawak	A	2—1	Erwin Carrillo 2' Emmanuel Kenmogne 64'	15,000	
17 Mar 2015	Kuala Lumpur	H	1—0	Wan Zack 66'	10,000	
07 Apr 2015	(Malaysia) Sime Darby	A	1—1	Erwin Carrillo 45+1'	5,000	aggregate 1-1
21 Apr 2015	(Malaysia) Sime Darby	H	3—0	Piya 40'p Amutu 58' Erwin Carrillo 74'	5,000	Kelantan win with aggregate 4-1
9 May 2015	(Malaysia) Pahang	A	0—1			aggregate 0-1
16 May 2015	(Malaysia) Pahang	H	3—1	Kechik 18' Amutu 74' 90+2'		Kelantan win with aggregate 3-2
23 May 2015	(Singapore) LionsXII	N	1—3	Wan Zack Haikal 63'		Kelantan became 2015 Malaysia FA Cup runner up after they lost in the final to LionsXII 1-3

=== Malaysia Cup ===
The draw for the 2015 Malaysia Cup was held on 27 August 2015 at the Hilton Hotel Petaling Jaya and Kelantan FA was drawn into group C which is arguably the “Group of Death” consisting of 32-time winners Selangor FA, previous season semi-finalist Felda United F.C. and T-Team F.C.. Their Journey in Malaysia Cup ended after they finished in third place behind 2015 Malaysia Cup semi-finalist, Felda United F.C. and champion, Selangor FA.

=== Group stage ===
Date	Opponents	H / A	Result F–A	Scorers	Attendance	Referee	Group ranking
12 September 2015	(Malaysia) Selangor FA	A	3-0	Gilmar Jose da Silva Filho 26',53'Austin Amutu48'	-	-	2nd
18 September 2015	(Malaysia) Felda United F.C.	H	1-1	Gilmar Jose da Silva Filho 49'	-	-	▲1st
26 September 2015	(Malaysia) (Terengganu) T–Team F.C.	A	1-3	Gilmar Jose da Silva Filho 87'	-	-	▼2nd
2 October 2015	(Malaysia) Selangor FA	H	0-1		-	-	▼4th
17 October 2015	(Malaysia) Felda United F.C.	A	2-2	Mohd Firdaus Faudzi 28'(o.g.) Badhri Radzi 43'	-	-	4th
4 November 2015	(Malaysia) (Terengganu) T-Team F.C.	H	3-1	Austin Amutu35',56'Gilmar Jose da Silva Filho40'	-	-	▲3rd

== Player statistics ==
=== Squad ===
On 1 December 2014, Tan Sri Annuar Musa has announced the 2015 provisional squad for Kelantan. It was finalized before the transfer window closed on 12 a.m., Friday 5 December 2014.

Key: = Appearances, = Goals, = Yellow card, (red card) = Red card (Player names in italics denotes player that left mid-season)

Number	Nation	Position	Name	Total				League				FA Cup				Malaysia Cup			
Number	Nation	Position	Name		Goal	Booked	Sent off (straight red)		Goal	Booked	Sent off (straight red)		Goal	Booked	Sent off (straight red)		Goal	Booked	Sent off (straight red)
1	(Malaysia) (Kelantan)	GK	Muhammad Syazwan Yusoff	0	0	0	0	0	0	0	0	0	0	0	0	0	0	0	0
17	(Malaysia) (Kelantan)	DF	Tuan Muhammad Faim Tuan Zainal Abidin	2	0	0	0	2	0	0	0	0	0	0	0	0	0	0	0
42	(Malaysia) (Kelantan)	DF	Amirizdwan Taj	18	1	5	0	9	1	3	0	3	0	1	0	6	0	1	0
4	(Australia)	DF	Jonathan McKain	26	2	10	0	16	2	4	0	6	0	2	0	4	0	2	0
5	(Malaysia) (Kelantan)	DF	Nik Shahrul Azim Abdul Halim	24	0	3	0	13	0	3	0	6	0	0	0	5	0	0	0
6	(Malaysia) (Kelantan)	DF	Mohd Farisham Ismail	21	0	2	0	15	0	2	0	4	0	0	0	2	0	0	0
11	(Malaysia) (Pahang)	MF	Wan Zack Haikal Wan Noor	29	5	3	0	20	3	2	0	5	2	0	0	4	0	1	0
8	(Malaysia) (Kelantan)	MF	Wan Zaharulnizam Zakaria	30	3	6	0	18	2	5	0	6	1	0	0	6	0	1	0
9	(Colombia)	FW	Erwin Carrillo	26	6	5	0	16	5	4	0	6	1	1	0	4	0	0	0
10	(Malaysia) (Terengganu)	FW	Mohd Nor Farhan Muhammad	26	6	3	1	17	6	3	1	6	0	0	0	3	0	0	0
47	(Nigeria)	ST	Austin Amutu	19	9	3	0	11	3	3	0	4	3	0	0	4	3	0	0
12	(Malaysia) (Kedah)	MF	Amar Rohidan	18	0	0	0	13	0	0	0	1	0	0	0	4	0	0	0
13	(Malaysia) (Kelantan)	FW	Ahmad Fakri Saarani	19	1	5	0	10	1	3	0	3	0	1	0	6	0	1	0
7	(Malaysia)	MF	Brendan Gan	1	0	0	0	1	0	0	0	0	0	0	0	0	0	0	0
2	(Malaysia) (Malacca)	DF	Norhafiz Zamani Misbah	28	0	3	0	18	0	3	0	6	0	0	0	4	0	0	0
16	(Malaysia) (Kelantan)	MF	Mohd Badhri Mohd Radzi (c)	31	5	1	0	20	3	0	0	6	1	0	0	5	1	1	0
15	(Malaysia) (Perak)	MF	Mohd Noor Hazrul Bin Mohd Mustafa	18	2	4	0	11	2	2	0	3	0	1	0	4	0	0	0
3	(Malaysia) (Selangor)	DF/MF	Mohd Fitri Omar	19	0	5	0	16	0	5	0	2	0	0	0	1	0	0	0
19	(Malaysia) (Kelantan)	GK	Khairul Fahmi Che Mat	32	0	1	0	21	0	1	0	6	0	0	0	5	0	0	0
22	(Malaysia) (Kelantan)	DF	Faizol Nazlin Sayuti	0	0	0	0	0	0	0	0	0	0	0	0	0	0	0	0
30	(Malaysia) (Kelantan)	GK	Mohd Shahrizan Ismail	4	0	1	0	3	0	1	0	0	0	0	0	1	0	0	0
21	(Malaysia) (Kelantan)	MF	Mohd Rozaimi Azwar Mat Noor	0	0	0	0	0	0	0	0	0	0	0	0	0	0	0	0
23	(Malaysia) (Kelantan)	MF	Mohd Khairul Izuan Rosli	16	1	2	1	11	1	1	1	3	0	0	0	2	0	1	0
24	(Malaysia) (Kelantan)	DF	Zairul Fitree Ishak	8	0	2	0	4	0	1	0	2	0	0	0	2	0	1	0
50	(Brazil)	FW	Gilmar Jose da Silva Filho	21	11	5	0	11	6	3	0	4	0	0	0	6	5	2	0
18	(Malaysia) (Selangor)	DF	Muhd Nazri Ahmad	1	0	0	0	0	0	0	0	0	0	0	0	1	0	0	0

=== Goalscorers ===
As of 1 October 2015

11 goals

- (Brazil) Gilmar Jose da Silva Filho

9 goals

- (Nigeria) Austin Amutu

6 goals

- (Malaysia) Nor Farhan Muhammad
- (Colombia) Erwin Carrillo

5 goals

- (Malaysia) Wan Zack Haikal
- (Malaysia) Mohd Badhri Mohd Radzi

3 goals

- (Malaysia) Wan Zaharulnizam Zakaria

2 goals

- (Malaysia) Noor Hazrul Mustafa
- (Australia) Jonathan McKain

1 goal

- (Cameroon) Emmanuel Kenmogne
- (Malaysia) Mohd Khairul Izuan Rosli
- (Malaysia) Amirizdwan Taj Tajuddin
- (Malaysia) Ahmad Fakri Saarani

== Transfers and loans ==
=== Transfers in ===
Entry date	Position	No.	Player	From club	Fee	Ref
1 July 2014	DF		(Australia) Jonathan McKain	(Australia) Adelaide United	Free	
9 November 2014	FW		(Malaysia) Nor Farhan Muhammad	(Malaysia) Terengganu FA	Free	
30 October 2014	DF		(Malaysia) Norhafiz Zamani Misbah	Negeri Sembilan FA	Undisclosed Fee	
30 October 2014	MF		(Malaysia) Noor Hazrul Mustafa	Perak FA	Undisclosed Fee	
1 December 2014	FW		(Colombia) Erwin Carrillo	(Colombia) Unión Magdalena	Undisclosed Fee	
6 December 2014	FW		(Cameroon) Emmanuel Kenmogne	(Indonesia) Persebaya Surabaya	Undisclosed Fee	
1 December 2014	MF		(Liberia) Isaac Pupo	(Indonesia) Persebaya Surabaya	Undisclosed Fee	
1 December 2014	FW		(Malaysia) Mohd Rozaimi Azwar Mat Noor	(Malaysia) Kelantan President Team	Promoted from youth team	
16 April 2015	FW		(Brazil) Gilmar Jose da Silva Filho	(Brazil) Clube Esportivo Lajeadense	Undisclosed Fee	
28 April 2015	DF		(Malaysia) Amirizdwan Taj Tajuddin	(Malaysia) ATM FA	Undisclosed Fee	
Total Transfer Sales					RM0	

=== Transfers out ===
Exit date	Position	No.	Player	To club	Fee	Ref.
14 November 2014	FW	10	(Liberia) Francis Forkey Doe	Negeri Sembilan FA	Released	
19 November 2014	FW	21	(Malaysia) Ahmad Shakir Mohd Ali	Kedah FA	Undisclosed Fee	
22 November 2014	DF	11	(Malaysia) Mohammad Abdul Aziz Ismail	Pahang FA	Released	
22 November 2014	MF	7	(Malaysia) Tengku Hasbullah Raja Hassan	None	Released	
22 November 2014	DF	3	(Malaysia) Mohamad Faiz Suhaimi	Malacca United S.A.	Released	
22 November 2014	FW	15	(Malaysia) Famirul Asyraf Sayuti	Malacca United S.A.	Released	
1 December 2014	MF	18	(Egypt) Mohamed Shawky	(Egypt) El Mokawloon SC	Released	
1 December 2014	DF	25	(Iraq) Hussein Alaa Hussein	None	Released	
16 April 2015	MF	25	(Liberia) Isaac Pupo	None	Released	
16 April 2015	FW	00	(Cameroon) Emmanuel Kenmogne	None	Released	
Total Transfer Sales					RM0	

=== Loans in ===
Start date	End date	Position	No.	Player	From	Ref
16 April 2015	December 2015	FW	47	(Nigeria) Austin Amutu	(Nigeria) Warri Wolves F.C.	

=== Loans out ===
Start date	End date	Position	No.	Player	To	Ref
28 April 2015	December 2015	DF	22	(Malaysia) Faizol Nazlin Sayuti	Sabah FA	
28 April 2015	December 2015	FW	21	(Malaysia) Rozaimi Azwar	Sabah FA	

== Club officials ==
=== Coaching and medical staff ===
- Manager-Haji Azman Ibrahim
- Assistant manager-Wan Badri Wan Omar
- Head coach-Zahasmi Ismail
- Assistant coach-Mohd Hashim Mustapha, Mohd Nafuzi Muhamad Zain and Sidek Shamsudin
- Goalkeeping coach-Ismail Chawalit Abu Bakar
- Fitness coach- Luka Basic
- Physiotherapist-Mohd Zainudin Zakaria and Ahmad Faris Musa

=== Backroom staff ===
- Kit manager- Harun Ismail
- Media official- Zuki Deraman
- Security official-Fared bin Abdul Ghani or Dato'Mohd Farek

== See also ==
- List of Kelantan FA seasons
