= Melawati F.C. =

Malaysian football club

Melawati
- Full name: Melawati Football Club
- Nickname: Melawati Boys
- Short name: MFC
- Founded: 2014; 12 years ago, as Dak-dak Melawati
- Dissolved: 2020
- Ground: Sayyidina Hamzah Stadium, IIUM
- President: Azzlan Azzam
- Head coach: Mat Zan Mat Aris
- League: Malaysia M3 League

Melawati Football Club was a Malaysian football club based in Taman Melawati, Ulu Klang, Selangor. They last played in the third-tier Malaysia M3 League.

== History ==
The club was founded in 2014 in Taman Melawati, Selangor and participated in several competitions in Klang Valley. It was the first club in the Klang Valley League to win four consecutive league titles (2014, 2015, 2016, and 2017). In 2018, the club has won the Selangor Social Premier League and became eligible to compete in the Malaysia M3 League.

On 17 February 2019, the club competed in the Malaysia FA Cup for the first time in its history. Starting from 2020 season, the club has been rebranded to Melawati Football Club.

== Season by season record ==
Season	Division	Position	Malaysia Cup	Malaysian FA Cup	Malaysian Charity Shield	Regional	Top scorer (All competitions)
2019	Liga M3	8th of 14	DNQ	Preliminary round	–	–	(Malaysia) Afif Najmi (11) (Malaysia) Norhamizaref Hamid (11)
2020^{1}	Liga M3	Season abandoned	DNQ	DNQ	–	–	None

Notes:'

^1 2020 Season cancelled due to the COVID-19 pandemic, no promotion or league title was awarded.

== Players ==
=== First-team squad (2020) ===
Note: Flags indicate national team as defined under FIFA eligibility rules; some limited exceptions apply. Players may hold more than one non-FIFA nationality.

No.	Pos.	Nation	Player
1	GK	MAS	Faiz Abdul Khalid
4	DF	MAS	Norhizwan Hassan
6	DF	MAS	Azim Faris Yusop
7	MF	MAS	Fahrul Razi (captain)
8	MF	MAS	Wan Muhd Erffan Daniel
9	FW	MAS	Irfan Syamil Mohamad
10	FW	JPN	Ryohei Miyazaki
12	MF	MAS	Yaqqinuddin Bahanordin
13	FW	MAS	Kamarul Adzha Azham
14	FW	SEN	Faye Jacque
15	MF	MAS	Hamizan Aiman Pairol
16	DF	MAS	Rizqi Azman
17	MF	MAS	Kavishkumar Manimaharan

No.	Pos.	Nation	Player
19	MF	MAS	Premananthan Kerisnan
20	MF	MAS	Filzaiman Mat Rapi
21	GK	MAS	Azreen Sumadi
22	GK	MAS	Wan Ahmad Hababa
27	FW	MAS	Asyraaf Fadzli Ahmad Pu'ad
28	DF	MAS	Aidil Zainal
29	MF	MAS	Abdul Hakim Siswazair
30	FW	MAS	Khairul Naim Mahyuddin
46	FW	MAS	S. Sivanesan
99	DF	MAS	Safwan Hashim

== Management (2020) ==
- Head coach: Mat Zan Mat Aris
- Assistant coach: Zhafrizan Abu Bakar
- Goalkeeping coach: Muzaffar Shah Dzulkafli

== Honours ==
=== Domestic competitions ===
==== League ====
- Klang Valley League Gombak

(gold) Winners (4): 2014, 2015, 2016, 2017

- Selangor Social Premier League

(gold) Winners (1): 2018
