= Hazwan Bakri =

Malaysian footballer

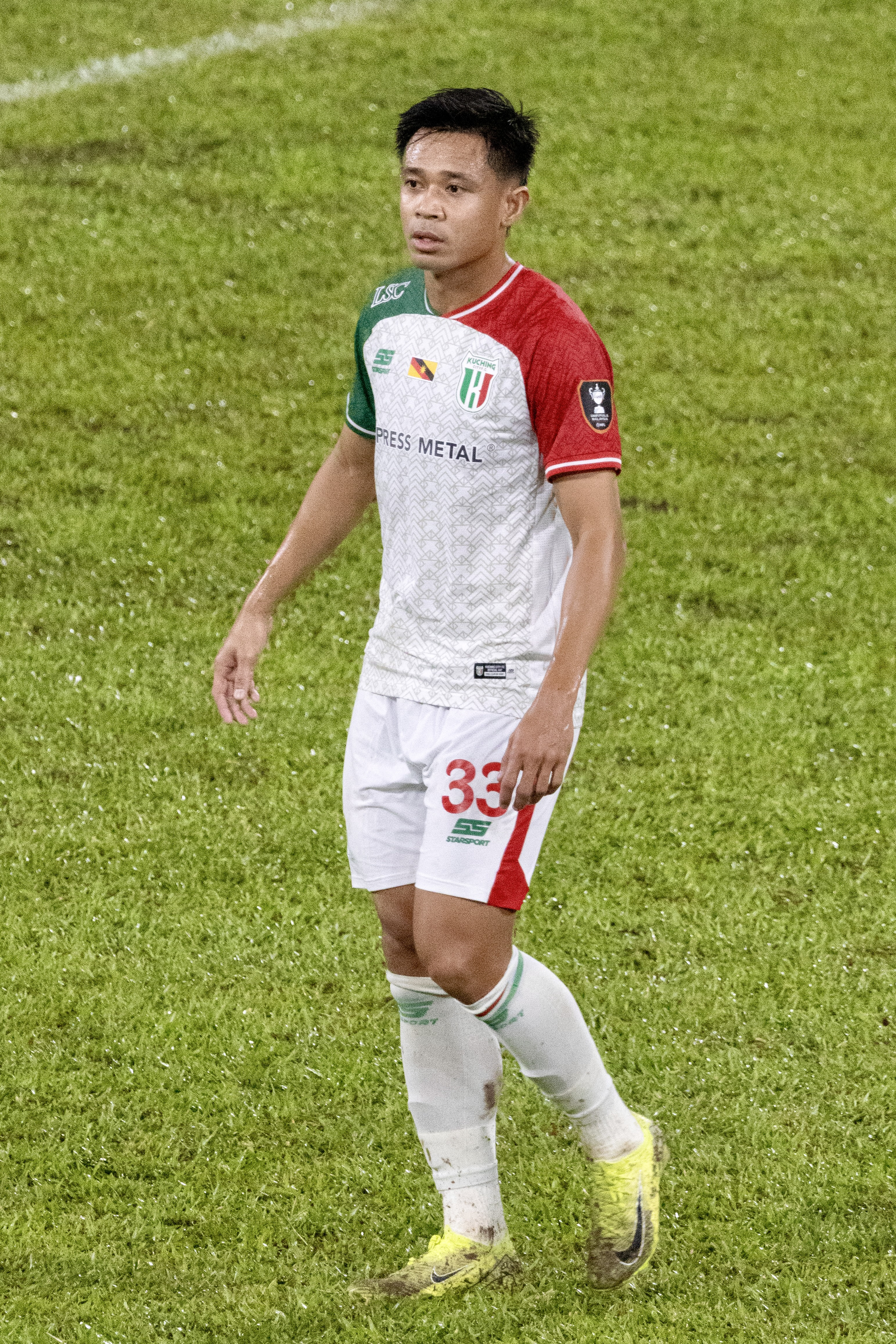
- Hazwan with Kuching City in 2025

Personal information
- Full name: Ahmad Hazwan bin Bakri
- Date of birth: 19 June 1991 (age 35)
- Place of birth: Labuan, Federal Territory, Malaysia
- Height: 1.75 m (5 ft 9 in)
- Positions: Forward; winger

Team information
- Current team: Kuching City
- Number: 33

Youth career
- 2007–2008: Bukit Jalil Sports School

Senior career*
Years	Team	Apps	(Gls)
2009–2013	Kuala Lumpur	?	(13)
2012–2013	→ Harimau Muda A (loan)	20	(8)
2014–2016	Selangor	46	(11)
2017–2023	Johor Darul Ta'zim	44	(5)
2019–2023	Johor Darul Ta'zim II	7	(0)
2024–	Kuching City	2	(1)

International career^{‡}
2011–2013	Malaysia U-23	18	(7)
2012–2019	Malaysia	30	(8)
Medal record
Men's football
Representing Malaysia
Men's football
AFF Championship
Runner-up	2018
- * Club domestic league appearances and goals as of 13 December 2023 ‡ National team caps and goals as of 16 November 2018

Ahmad Hazwan bin Bakri (born 19 June 1991) is a Malaysian professional footballer who plays as a forward or a winger for Malaysia Super League side Kuching City and the Malaysia national team.

== Club career ==
=== Kuala Lumpur ===
Hazwan began his career at Kuala Lumpur after being discovered by Kuala Lumpur's scout Akram Hadid on a scouting mission to Labuan. He played for Kuala Lumpur youth team before being promoted to the first team. He was loaned to Harimau Muda project and spent a season playing in the Singapore's S.League.

=== Selangor ===
Hazwan joined Selangor in 2014. He played a vital role in Selangor's 2015 Malaysia Cup campaign. He scored 2 goals in the final against Kedah which saw Selangor lifting the trophy after 10 years. He also named as the best player in the 2015 Malaysia Cup final.

=== Johor Darul Ta'zim ===
On 13 December 2016, Hazwan signed a two-year contract with Johor Darul Ta'zim for an undisclosed fee. Press at the time reported the transfer value at figures between US$60,000 and US$100,000.

On 20 January 2017, Hazwan made his league debut in a 1–1 draw against Kedah. He played for 43 minutes before being replaced with Jerónimo Barrales. Hazwan scored his first league goal in a 1–2 defeat over Perak on 18 February 2017.

Hazwan also played for the feeder team of Johor Darul Ta'zim. He played in the second leg of 2019 Malaysia Challenge Cup final against UKM.

=== Kuching City ===
After being without a club for nearly 9 months, on 9 September 2024, Hazwan signed for Kuching City in the mid-transfer window.

== International career ==
=== Youth ===
In 2011, Hazwan was called up to play for Malaysia U-23. He made his Malaysia U-23 debut on 13 September 2011 playing against Oman U-23 at UiTM Stadium. On 5 February 2012, he scored his first U-23 international goal in a 2–1 defeat against Bahrain U-23 during the 2012 Olympic qualification match. In the final of 2012 Thanh Nien Newspaper Cup, Hazwan scored the only goal as Malaysia defeat the host Vietnam 1–0. In the 2013 Southeast Asian Games, Hazwan scored a hat-trick in a 4–1 win against Laos.

=== Senior ===
On 28 April 2012, Hazwan made his debut for the senior team, scoring a hat-trick against Sri Lanka in a friendly match as Malaysia ran out 6–0 victors. Hazwan became the youngest player to score a hat trick for Malaysia.

== Career statistics ==
=== Club ===
As of 13 December 2023.

Appearances and goals by club, season and competition
Club	Season	League			Cup		League Cup		Others (Note: Includes AFC Cup, AFC Champions League, Piala Sumbangsih, and MFL Challenge Cup.)		Total	
Club	Season	Division	Apps	Goals	Apps	Goals	Apps	Goals	Apps	Goals	Apps	Goals
Kuala Lumpur	2009	Malaysia Premier League		4		0	6	0	–			4
Kuala Lumpur	2010	Malaysia Super League	19	2	4	1	4	1	–		27	4
Kuala Lumpur	2011	Malaysia Super League	19	7	0	0	2	1	–		21	8
Kuala Lumpur	Total			13		1	12	2	–			16
Harimau Muda A (loan)	2012	S.League	20	8	0	0	0	0	–		20	8
Harimau Muda A (loan)	Total		20	8	0	0	0	0	–		20	8
Selangor	2014	Malaysia Super League	8	1	2	0	7	2	3	0	20	3
Selangor	2015	Malaysia Super League	22	7	2	1	9	4	–		33	12
Selangor	2016	Malaysia Super League	16	3	0	0	9	4	3	1	28	8
Selangor	Total		46	11	4	1	25	10	6	1	81	23
Johor Darul Ta'zim	2017	Malaysia Super League	16	3	3	1	7	2	7	1	33	7
Johor Darul Ta'zim	2018	Malaysia Super League	18	1	4	0	10	1	7	2	39	4
Johor Darul Ta'zim	2019	Malaysia Super League	2	0	1	0	3	0	3	0	9	0
Johor Darul Ta'zim	2020	Malaysia Super League	0	0	0	0	1	0	0	0	1	0
Johor Darul Ta'zim	2021	Malaysia Super League	4	0	–		3	1	1	0	8	1
Johor Darul Ta'zim	2022	Malaysia Super League	4	1	1	1	0	0	2	0	7	2
Johor Darul Ta'zim	2023	Malaysia Super League	0	0	0	0	0	0	0	0	0	0
Johor Darul Ta'zim	Total		44	5	9	2	24	4	20	3	97	14
Johor Darul Ta'zim II	2019	Malaysia Premier League	–						1	0	1	0
Johor Darul Ta'zim II	2021	Malaysia Premier League	2	0	–						2	0
Johor Darul Ta'zim II	2022	Malaysia Premier League	5	0	–						5	0
Johor Darul Ta'zim II	Total		7	0	–		–		1	0	8	0
Career Total												

=== International ===
Malaysia national team
Year	Apps	Goals
2012	2	3
2015	6	0
2016	12	4
2017	5	0
2018	5	0
Total	30	7

=== International goals ===
As of match played 6 June 2016. Malaysia score listed first, score column indicates score after each Hazwan goal.

International goals by date, venue, cap, opponent, score, result and competition
No.	Date	Venue	Cap	Opponent	Score	Result	Competition
1	28 April 2012	Shah Alam Stadium, Shah Alam, Malaysia	1	Sri Lanka	3–0	6–0	Friendly
2	28 April 2012	Shah Alam Stadium, Shah Alam, Malaysia	1	Sri Lanka	4–0	6–0	Friendly
3	28 April 2012	Shah Alam Stadium, Shah Alam, Malaysia	1	Sri Lanka	6–0	6–0	Friendly
4	2 June 2016	Tan Sri Dato Haji Hassan Yunos Stadium, Larkin, Malaysia	10	Timor-Leste	1–0	3–0	2019 AFC Asian Cup qualification
5	2 June 2016	Tan Sri Dato Haji Hassan Yunos Stadium, Larkin, Malaysia	10	Timor-Leste	2–0	3–0	2019 AFC Asian Cup qualification
6	6 June 2016	Tan Sri Dato Haji Hassan Yunos Stadium, Larkin, Malaysia	11	Timor-Leste	2–0	3–0	2019 AFC Asian Cup qualification
7	14 November 2016	Shah Alam Stadium, Malaysia	16	Papua New Guinea	1–0	2–1	Friendly

== Honours ==
Selangor

- Malaysia Cup: 2015

Johor Darul Ta'zim

- Malaysia Super League: 2017, 2018, 2019, 2020, 2021, 2022, 2023
- Malaysia FA Cup: 2022, 2023
- Malaysia Cup: 2017, 2019, 2022, 2023
- Malaysia Charity Shield: 2018, 2019, 2020, 2021, 2022, 2023

Johor Darul Ta'zim II

- Malaysia Premier League: 2022
- MFL Challenge Cup: 2019

Malaysia

- AFF Championship : 2018 runner up

Individual

- National Football Awards : 2016
- Malaysia Cup Most Valuable Player : 2015
