= Bashahrul Abu Bakar =

Malaysian footballer

Personal information
- Full name: Mohamad Bashahrul bin Abu Bakar
- Date of birth: 6 April 1990 (age 36)
- Place of birth: Kedah, Malaysia
- Height: 1.79 m (5 ft 10 1/2 in)
- Position: Centre back

Youth career
- 2006–2007: Kedah FA President Cup

Senior career*
Years	Team	Apps	(Gls)
2007–2009	Harimau Muda		
2010–2011	Harimau Muda A		
2012–2013	Kedah FA	2	(0)
2013–	Sime Darby FC	5	(0)

International career^{‡}
2008–	Malaysia U21	5	(0)
- * Club domestic league appearances and goals as of 14 April 2013 ‡ National team caps and goals as of 14 April 2013

Bashahrul Abu Bakar (born 6 April 1990 in Kedah) is a Malaysian footballer formerly playing for Sime Darby F.C. in Malaysia Premier League.
