= Syamim Othman =

Malaysian footballer

Personal information
- Full name: Muhammad Syamim bin Othman
- Date of birth: 6 January 1990 (age 36)
- Place of birth: Selangor, Malaysia
- Height: 1.75 m (5 ft 9 in)
- Position: Goalkeeper

Team information
- Current team: Penang
- Number: 1

Youth career
- 2007–2008: Selangor's Youth Cup Team

Senior career*
| Years | Team | Apps | (Gls) |
| 2009 | Harimau Muda B | 21 | (0) |
| 2010 | Harimau Muda A | 8 | (0) |
| 2011 | Johor | 19 | (0) |
| 2012 | Felda United | 11 | (0) |
| 2013 | Johor | 16 | (0) |
| 2014–2015 | Selangor | 18 | (0) |
| 2016 | Cheras Premier | | |
| 2017–2018 | Felcra FC | | |
| 2019– | Penang | 1 | (0) |

International career^{‡}
| 2009–2013 | Malaysia U23 | 10 | (0) |
- * Club domestic league appearances and goals as of 3 February, 2019 ‡ National team caps and goals as of January 23, 2017

Muhammad Syamim bin Othman (born 6 January 1990) is a Malaysian footballer who plays for Penang as a goalkeeper.

== Early life, family and education ==
Muhammad Syamim Othman was born in Kuala Lumpur.

== Athletic career ==
He began his career with hometown team Selangor in 2007 when he was almost 18 years old. He later joined Harimau Muda B after impressing the national youth club. After spending a few years at the club, he joined Harimau Muda A for the U-21's once he exceeded the age limit for Harimau Muda B.

Syamim played for Johor in 2013. In the season of 2014, he was transferred to Selangor and was selected as the number one goalkeeper.
