= K. Linggam =

Malaysian footballer

Personal information
- Full name: Linggam a/l Krishnan
- Date of birth: 2 January 1985 (age 41)
- Place of birth: Malacca, Malaysia
- Height: 1.76 m (5 ft 9 1/2 in)
- Position: Midfielder

Youth career
- 2000: Malacca

Senior career*
Years	Team	Apps	(Gls)
2000–2007	Malacca		(3)
2007–2008	DPMM	2	(0)
2011	Sime Darby		

International career^{‡}
2004	Malaysia U-19		
2005	Malaysia U-23		
- * Club domestic league appearances and goals as of 27 January 2017 ‡ National team caps and goals as of 22 May 2009

K. Linggam (born 2 January 1985 in Malacca) is a Malaysian footballer who is recently playing for Sime Darby FC in the Malaysia Super League. He appeared twice for Brunei-based professional football team DPMM FC in the 2007–08 Malaysia Super League.
