= Gilmar (footballer, born 1988) =

Brazilian footballer

Personal information
- Full name: Gilmar José da Silva Filho
- Date of birth: 28 November 1988 (age 37)
- Place of birth: São Paulo, Brazil
- Height: 1.92 m (6 ft 3 1/2 in)
- Position: Forward

Team information
- Current team: Balestier Khalsa
- Number: 9

Youth career
- 2005–2008: Mamoré

Senior career*
| Years | Team | Apps | (Gls) |
| 2008–2010 | Mamoré | 0 | (0) |
| 2010–2012 | Atlético Ibirama | 6 | (0) |
| 2011 | → GIF Sundsvall (loan) | 15 | (8) |
| 2012 | → Novo Hamburgo (loan) | 0 | (0) |
| 2013 | Juventude | 2 | (0) |
| 2013 | Vila Nova | 7 | (1) |
| 2014 | Pelotas | 8 | (1) |
| 2014 | Lajeadense | 15 | (3) |
| 2015 | Kelantan | 11 | (6) |
| 2016 | Sarawak | 19 | (7) |
| 2017 | Caxias do Sul | 11 | (4) |
| 2017 | Boa | 1 | (0) |
| 2017–2019 | Perak | 35 | (17) |
| 2019 | Cuiabá | 11 | (2) |
| 2020 | Caxias do Sul | 7 | (0) |
| Total | | 148 | (49) |
- * Club domestic league appearances and goals as of 22 February 2020

Gilmar José da Silva Filho (born 28 November 1988 in São Paulo), commonly known as Gilmar, is a former Brazilian footballer who plays as a forward.

== Club career ==
=== Kelantan ===
On 16 April 2015, Gilmar signed with Kelantan during mid transfer window. He made 11 league appearances and 6 goals before left for Sarawak in December 2015.

=== Caxias ===
Gilmar signed with Brazilian side Caxias in January 2017. Gilmar scored his first goal for the club in a 1−0 victory over Veranópolis in a friendly match.

=== Perak ===
On 9 June 2017, Gilmar signed 18 months contract with Malaysian side Perak. Gilmar made his debut for Perak in a 2−3 win over Kedah and also scored his first goal in a league match on 1 July 2017.

== Career statistics ==
=== Club ===
As of match played 22 February 2020.

Appearances and goals by club, season and competition
| Club | Season | League | | | State League | | Cup^{1} | | League Cup^{2} | | Continental | | Other | | Total | |
| Club | Season | Division | Apps | Goals | Apps | Goals | Apps | Goals | Apps | Goals | Apps | Goals | Apps | Goals | Apps | Goals |
|---|---|---|---|---|---|---|---|---|---|---|---|---|---|---|---|---|
| Atlético Ibirama | 2012 | Campeonato Catarinense | — | | 6 | 0 | — | | — | | — | | — | | 6 | 0 |
| Juventude | 2013 | Campeonato Gaúcho | — | | 2 | 0 | — | | — | | — | | — | | 2 | 0 |
| Vila Nova | 2013 | Série D | 7 | 1 | — | | — | | — | | — | | — | | 7 | 1 |
| Pelotas | 2014 | Campeonato Gaúcho | — | | 8 | 1 | — | | — | | — | | — | | 8 | 1 |
| Lajeadense | 2014 | Campeonato Gaúcho | — | | 15 | 3 | 1 | 0 | — | | — | | — | | 16 | 3 |
| Lajeadense | 2015 | Campeonato Gaúcho | — | | 0 | 0 | 1 | 0 | — | | — | | — | | 1 | 0 |
| Lajeadense | Total | | — | | 15 | 3 | 2 | 0 | — | | — | | — | | 17 | 3 |
| Kelantan | 2015 | Malaysia Super League | 11 | 6 | — | | 4 | 0 | 6 | 5 | — | | — | | 21 | 11 |
| Sarawak | 2016 | Malaysia Super League | 19 | 7 | — | | 1 | 0 | — | | — | | — | | 20 | 7 |
| Caxias | 2017 | Campeonato Gaúcho | — | | 11 | 4 | — | | — | | — | | — | | 11 | 4 |
| Boa | 2017 | Série B | 1 | 0 | — | | — | | — | | — | | — | | 1 | 0 |
| Perak | 2017 | Malaysia Super League | 7 | 2 | — | | — | | 7 | 8 | — | | — | | 14 | 10 |
| Perak | 2018 | Malaysia Super League | 20 | 11 | — | | 4 | 3 | 10 | 7 | — | | — | | 34 | 21 |
| Perak | 2019 | Malaysia Super League | 8 | 4 | — | | 2 | 0 | 0 | 0 | 2 | 0 | — | | 12 | 4 |
| Perak | Total | | 35 | 17 | — | | 6 | 3 | 17 | 15 | 2 | 0 | — | | 60 | 35 |
| Cuiabá | 2019 | Série B | 11 | 2 | — | | — | | — | | — | | 1 | 0 | 12 | 2 |
| Caxias do Sul | 2020 | Campeonato Gaúcho | — | | 7 | 0 | 1 | 0 | — | | — | | — | | 8 | 0 |
| Career Total | | | 84 | 33 | 49 | 8 | 14 | 3 | 23 | 20 | 2 | 0 | 1 | 0 | 173 | 64 |

^{1} Includes Copa do Brasil and Malaysia FA Cup matches.
^{2} Includes Malaysia Cup matches.

== Honours ==
=== Club ===
Perak TBG F.C.

- Malaysia Cup Winner (1): 2018
