= Norazlan Razali =

Malaysian footballer (born 1985)

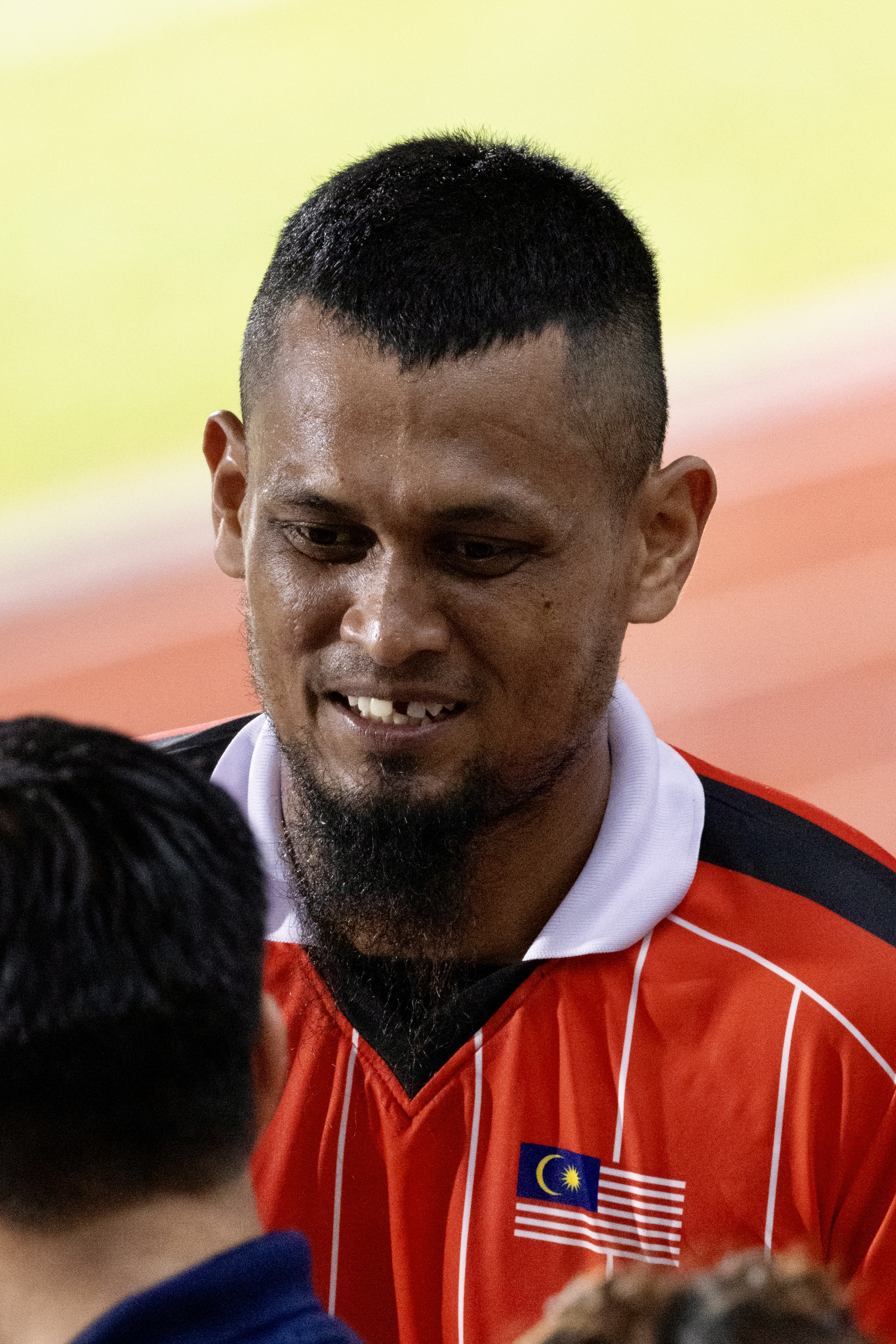
- Norazlan in 2024

Personal information
- Full name: Norazlan bin Razali
- Date of birth: 19 December 1985 (age 40)
- Place of birth: Johor, Malaysia
- Height: 1.85 m (6 ft 1 in)
- Position: Goalkeeper

Team information
- Current team: Melaka United

Youth career
- 2003–2006: Johor U-21

Senior career*
Years	Team	Apps	(Gls)
2006–2009	Johor		
2009–2011	Kuala Lumpur		
2011–2013	Selangor		
2014	Johor Darul Ta'zim		
2015–2018	Selangor		
2019	FELDA United	22	(0)
2020–2022	Melaka United	14	(0)

International career^{‡}
2013–	Malaysia	1	(0)
- * Club domestic league appearances and goals as of 30 June 2018 ‡ National team caps and goals as of 15 February 2017

Norazlan bin Razali (born 19 December 1985) is a Malaysian professional footballer who plays for Malaysia Super League side Melaka United as a goalkeeper.

== Club career ==
=== Johor, Kuala Lumpur ===
Norazlan began his career with home town team Johor before moving to Kuala Lumpur in 2010, making 52 appearances and earning a national team call up. He made three appearances against Iraq, Saudi Arabia and Palestine but none of the match listed as FIFA 'A' international match.

=== Selangor ===
In 2015, Norazlan returned to Selangor.

=== Felda United ===
In the 2019 season, Norazlan was transferred to Felda United under the wings of Mohd Nidzam Jamil.

== Career statistics ==
=== Club ===
As of 30 June 2018

Appearances and goals by club, season and competition
Club	Season	League			National cup (Note: Includes Malaysia FA Cup.)		League cup (Note: Includes Malaysia Cup.)		Continental (Note: Includes AFC Cup.)		Total	
Club	Season	Division	Apps	Goals	Apps	Goals	Apps	Goals	Apps	Goals	Apps	Goals
Selangor	2015	Malaysia Super League	9	0	1	0	11	0	—		21	0
Selangor	2016	Malaysia Super League	14	0	0	0	3	0	4	0	21	0
Selangor	2017	Malaysia Super League	7	0	0	0	4	0	—		11	0
Selangor	2018	Malaysia Super League	4	0	2	0	0	0	—		6	0
Selangor	Total		34	0	3	0	18	0	4	0	59	0
Felda United	2019	Malaysia Super League	2	0	0	0	0	0			2	0
Career total			0	0	0	0	0	0	0	0	0	0

== Honours ==
Johor Darul Takzim

- 2014 Malaysia Super League

Selangor Fa

- 2015 Malaysia Cup
