= Erwin Carrillo =

Colombian footballer (born 1983)

Personal information
- Full name: Erwin Albeiro Carrillo Fragozo
- Date of birth: June 25, 1983 (age 43)
- Place of birth: Santa Marta, Colombia
- Height: 1.81 m (5 ft 11 1/2 in)
- Position: Forward

Team information
- Current team: LDU Loja

Senior career*
| Years | Team | Apps | (Gls) |
| 2002–2004 | Deportivo Cali | 21 | (12) |
| 2004–2005 | Unión Magdalena | 15 | (9) |
| 2006 | Once Caldas | 10 | (6) |
| 2007 | Junior de Barranquilla | 11 | (8) |
| 2007–2009 | Unión Magdalena | 19 | (21) |
| 2009–2010 | Patriotas | 18 | (13) |
| 2011 | Atlético Huila | 12 | (2) |
| 2011–2012 | FBC Melgar | 10 | (3) |
| 2012–2014 | Unión Magdalena | 106 | (49) |
| 2015 | Kelantan | 26 | (15) |
| 2016 | Real Cartagena | 29 | (7) |
| 2017 | Cúcuta Deportivo | 36 | (19) |
| 2018 | Unión Magdalena | 14 | (2) |
| 2019– | LDU Loja | 11 | (2) |

International career
| 2003 | Colombia U-20 | | |
- * Club domestic league appearances and goals

Erwin Albeiro Carrillo Fragozo (born June 25, 1983) is a Colombian professional footballer who plays for LDU Loja as a striker. He is known as "a powerful, no-nonsense striker.

In January 2010 arrived to the Chilean football club Everton. He has also played for Deportivo Cali, Unión Magdalena, Once Caldas, Junior and Patriotas. During 2014 season, Carrillo was the top scorer for the second division football league in Colombia representing Unión Magdalena with 19 goals.

== Kelantan ==
In 2015, Carrillo signed with Malaysia Super League club Kelantan. During the interview with local newspaper, he said no reason as to why he would not be able to shine for his team this season despite not being fluent in English and Malay. On February 7, he scored one goal during his debut against ATM that end up his team won 2–0.

== International career ==
He played with the Colombian U-20 national team at the 2003 FIFA World Youth Championship in UAE, helping Colombia finish third by beating Argentina 2–1.
