= Jeremy Matthew Danker =

Malaysian footballer

Jeremy Matthew
Personal information
- Full name: Jeremy Matthew
- Date of birth: 20 February 1984 (age 42)
- Place of birth: Malaysia
- Height: 1.69 m (5 ft 6 1/2 in)
- Positions: Defender; striker

Team information
- Current team: Kuala Lumpur FA

Senior career*
Years	Team	Apps	(Gls)
2003–2006	Public Bank FC	46	(2)
2007	UPB MyTeam	6	(0)
2009	Kuala Lumpur FA	16	(0)
2010	Sabah FA	21	(1)
2011	Johor United	26	(2)
2012–2013	Kuala Lumpur FA	30	(1)
- * Club domestic league appearances and goals

Jeremy Matthew (born 20 February 1984) is a former Malaysian footballer.

== Career ==
=== Public Bank FC ===
Jeremy started his semi pro career with the now defunct Public Bank FC after he was introduced to the club. Due to his young age at that time, Jeremy was not given any appearance for the team.

=== Perak UPB my/team ===
Jeremy moved to another now defunct Malaysian Super League team UPB MyTeam after a successful open trial under a reality TV series MyTeam launched in 2006. UPB MyTeam was then invited to join the Malaysian Premier League for 2007 season where they finished the season as runners up and thus, was promoted to the Malaysian Super League for the 2008 season.

=== Kuala Lumpur FA ===
After MyTeam was disbanded, Jeremy moved on and played for Kuala Lumpur FA. He was a regular starter for the team until some miscommunication led him to sign for Sabah FA during the transfer window.

=== Sabah FA ===
Jeremy suffered a new blow when he did not manage to appear for Sabah FA in the remainder games of the league. His contract was then terminated unlawfully by Sabah FA and the case is currently pending settlement from both parties.

=== Johor United ===
Jeremy moved on with Johor United for the 2011/2012 season in the Malaysia Premier League. He had a fruitful pre-season start for the club after appearing regularly and scored on several occasion. Despite the bright start, Jeremy was only given less than a handful of appearances for the club and left the club after serving his contract.

=== Kuala Lumpur FA ===
Jeremy moved back to Kuala Lumpur FA for the 2013 season in the Malaysian Premier League which also saw Kuala Lumpur FA being demoted to FAM Cup for the 2013/2014 season.
