= Fahrul Razi Kamaruddin =

Malaysian footballer

Fahrul Razi
Personal information
- Full name: Fahrul Razi Bin Kamaruddin
- Date of birth: 12 April 1986 (age 40)
- Place of birth: Kuala Lumpur, Malaysia
- Height: 1.66 m (5 ft 5 1/2 in)
- Position: Winger

Team information
- Current team: DDM FC

Youth career
- 2005–2006: Kuala Lumpur U-21

Senior career*
Years	Team	Apps	(Gls)
2005–2006	Kuala Lumpur		
2006–2010	UiTM		
2011–2012	Kuala Lumpur	21	(0)
2012–2013	Perak		
2013–2015	Sime Darby		
2016	Kuala Lumpur		
2017–2018	Petaling Jaya Rangers		
2019	Perlis		
2019–	DDM FC		
- * Club domestic league appearances and goals as of June 23, 2019

Fahrul Razi Bin Kamaruddin (born 12 April 1986) is a Malaysian footballer who plays for DDM FC in the Malaysia M3 League.

== Club career ==
He formerly played for Kuala Lumpur FA. He also played for UiTM FC, where he helped them to win various varsity championships, among them Liga IPT 2010.

He agreed to join Perak FA for the 2012 Malaysia Super League. He played for them for only that season, before being released at the end of the season.

Fahrul joined Sime Darby F.C. for the 2013 Malaysia Premier League along with four ex-Perak players.

== International career ==
He was selected to represent Malaysia varsity national football team in various international varsity championships like FISU World Cup and Universiade.
