= History of Negeri Sembilan FC =

History of Negeri Sembilan Football Club

This article documents the history of Negeri Sembilan Football Club, a Malaysian association football team.

The club was established in 1923, according to a passage in the football history books of Malaysia based on an interview with Austin Senevirathe, who was 93 years old when interviewed. He spoke about a match that happened between PBNS and Singapore for the Malaya Cup in that particular year. Negeri Sembilan is one of the oldest football clubs in Malaysia. Other older teams are Penang and Perak, which were each formed in 1921. In 2023, Negeri Sembilan celebrated the 100th anniversary of its establishment.

The club is one of the top competing teams in the history of football since its establishment. They have won many top competitions in Malaysia, starting in the early 1940s. The club also gave rise to many Malaysian football stars who brought success to both club and country such as Kwan Soon Teck, Mok Wai Hong, B. Rajinikandh, N. Thanabalan, B. Sathianathan, Ching Hong Aik, Shukor Adan, Norhafiz Zamani Misbah, Aidil Zafuan, Zaquan Adha, Farizal Marlias, S. Kunanlan, Shahurain Abu Samah and many more.

Throughout 2003–2011 there was a "golden generation" for the Negeri Sembilan team because, throughout the year, the team achieved a lot of success in competitions at the domestic level. Starting with winning the FA Cup in 2003, the team managed to win the Super League in 2005–06. The most proud performance was when Negeri Sembilan successfully made it through the Malaysia Cup final stage three years in a row from 2009 to 2011. The team won two finals in 2009 and 2011, and in 2010, the team became runners-up when they had to accept a defeat, but they managed to win the FA Cup in the same year (2010). In addition, this golden era also saw the emergence of several big names who were with the Negeri Sembilan team in the Malaysian football scene, including Ching Hong Aik, Shukor Adan, Norhafiz Zamani, Khairul Anuar Baharom, Bekamenga Bekamengo, Sani Anuar, Rezal Zambery, Zaquan Adha, Aidil Zafuan, Farizal Marlias, S. Kunanlan and Shahurain.

== 20s (1923–1929) ==
The club was established in 1923, according to a passage in the football history books of Malaysia based on an interview with Austin Senevirathe, who was 93 years old when interviewed. He stated that the Malaya Cup match between Negeri Sembilan and Singapore took place in that particular year. The book provides only an approximate year of establishment without specifying the exact date.

However, according to football historian Muhammad Fitrie in his dissertation, the Negeri Sembilan Football Association, NSFA, was officially established on 6 May 1926. The precise date of its formation was documented in The Straits Times. This finding contributes to a more accurate reconstruction of Negeri Sembilan’s football history.

In 1926 the Football Associations of Negeri Sembilan, Perak, Selangor, Malacca and the Singapore Amateur Football Association, came together to form the Malayan Football Association (MFA), to field a Malayan team against an Australia side that visited Singapore that year.

In 1927 PBNS started organising league matches. Among the trophies that were up for grabs at that time were the Annex Shield, the British Resident's Cup, and the Hose Cup. The earliest football clubs that existed and competed in the league were Negri Sembilan Chinese "A," Negri Sembilan Club, Port Dickson Recreation Club, Sungei Ujong Club, Negri Sembilan Chinese "B," and St. Paul's Old Boys Association.

== 40s (1940–1949) ==
In 1942–1947 all football competitions in Malaya were suspended due to World War II and the Japanese occupation of Malaya. This also caused the Negeri Sembilan team to stop participating in league and cup competitions until 1948, when the team was able to compete again.

In 1948 they won the first HMS Malaya Cup, led by skipper Kwan Soon Teck .

== 50s (1950–1959) ==
In 1953 Negeri Sembilan finished as runners-up in the Kings Gold Cup after being defeated by Kedah in the final with a 4–1 score.

== 80s (1980–1989) ==
In 1982 Tan Sri Dato' Seri Utama Mohd Isa bin Dato' Haji Abdul Samad was appointed president of the Negeri Sembilan Football Association (PBNS) as well as the Menteri Besar of Negeri Sembilan. Also in 1982, the Perbandaran Seremban Field was upgraded, and throughout that period, the team used the Kuala Pilah Stadium (a contemporary stadium) as their home ground where they had previously used the Perbandaran Seremban Field. Later, the field was renamed the Perbandaran Seremban Stadium and began to be used until 1991.

Negeri Sembilan played in the Liga Malaysia (English: Malaysia League) throughout the years 1982–1988, Liga Malaysia was an amateur football league run by the Football Association of Malaysia (FAM). Since 1982, Negeri Sembilan has only been a middle tier team and is not very prominent when compared to Selangor, Singapore, Kuala Lumpur, Pahang, and Penang.

In 1989 Liga Malaysia changed its status from amateur to semi-pro. The Semi-Pro League was introduced and divided into two tiers: the Division 1 League for the first tier and the Division 2 League for the second tier. Negeri Sembilan was placed in Division 2 according to their current performance. The team is only in an average position in Division 2 despite having used the services of Singapore international player R. Suriamurthy and Thailand import player Likit Sanatong.

== 90s (1990–1999) ==
1991 was the year of the revival of the Negeri Sembilan team, which in previous years had been an underdog. That was also the last year the Negeri Sembilan team used the Majlis Perbandaran Seremban Stadium, before the Tuanku Abdul Rahman Stadium in Paroi. On 18 August 1991, the team met Sarawak in the final match of the Division 2 League at the Majlis Perbandaran Seremban Stadium. With a result of 2–2, and they managed to collect one point. It was the last year that led to winning the Semi-Pro League Division 2, then qualifying for Division 1 in 1992. Among the star players at that time were the import trio, the Bozik Brothers (Miroslav and Robert), and the powerful striker Marian Valach. Local players included Richard Scully, Mansor Sulaiman, and Nazari Hussein.

In 1992, the construction of Tuanku Abdul Rahman Stadium was completed. The stadium initially held a capacity of 20,000 people. On 12 April 1992, Negeri Sembilan team won the 1992 Kings' Gold Cup after beating Terengganu FA, 2–1. The coaches and players shared a cash reward of RM20,000 from the Negeri Sembilan Malay Football Association. Negeri Sembilan's coach at that time was Haji Mohd Zaki Shaikh Ahmad. Earlier, the last time Negeri Sembilan FA participated in the final of the trophy was in 1953, when they lost 1–2 to Pulau Pinang.

In the 1996 season Negeri Sembilan became one of the contenders for the league title. Even though it was not given much attention at first, the team starring two former import players from Argentina, Gus Cerro and Jose Iriarte, surprised many when they gave great competition. Othman Katmon, Faizal Zainal, Khairil Zainal, Rosli Omar, B. Rajinikandh, A. Ganeson, V. Arumugham, Idris Kadir, Azmi Mohamed, and Ching Hong Aik were finally overtaken by Sabah FA, who emerged as the Premier League champion, as well as Kedah FA, who became the runner-up.

== 2000s (2000–2009) ==
On 31 May 2003, Negeri Sembilan met Perlis in the FA Cup final. Played at Perak Stadium, the club was surprised by the opponent's early goal in the 11th minute. The club managed to close the gap in the 56th minute thanks to a goal by Effendi Malek. The game remained 1–1 until the 90th minute, and in extra time, victory was decided on a golden goal. In the 95th minute, the club managed to win as a result of Everson Martinelli's goal, and was crowned the cup champion.

In 2004, the capacity of Negeri Sembilan's Tuanku Abdul Rahman Stadium was upgraded to 45,000 people for the hosting of the 2004 Sukma Games. Negeri Sembilan made its first appearance in the AFC Cup competition in the 2004 season. The club debuted against Island FC with a big 6–0 win on 10 February 2004. However, the club had to settle for being 3rd in the group after losing matches against Geylang United, East Bengal, and Island FC. All teams played at home and away for a total of six games.

In March 2004 Datuk Seri Mohamad Hasan was appointed as the president of the Negeri Sembilan Football Association (PBNS). He successfully held the position as the 10th Menteri Besar of Negeri Sembilan and replaced Isa Samad. Hasan was the first Menteri Besar who had ever been a local football player and then became the president of PBNS.

In the 2005–06 season, the team won the Malaysia Super League by finishing first out of eight clubs that competed. The newly promoted club from the Malaysian Premier League in the 2005 season managed to become the league champion in their first appearance.

On 7 November 2009, they ended their 61-year loss streak in the Malaysia Cup after posting a convincing 3–1 victory over Kelantan in the final at the National Stadium. The team also won all the matches in the Malaysia Cup tournament, starting from the group stage until the final.

The repeat final of 2009 between the club and Kelantan happened on 30 October 2010. However, this time the club lost 1–2, despite having taken an early lead through a penalty by Shahurain Abu Samah.

== 2010s (2010–2019) ==
On 10 April 2010, Negeri Sembilan needed the luck of the penalty shootout to win the FA Cup championship, again by beating Kedah 5–4 in the final of the 21st edition at the National Stadium, Bukit Jalil. This continues to confirm them as the new powerhouse of national football after winning the Malaysia Cup last season. Both teams were tied at 1–1 after the end of the 90 minutes of the actual game, even after the referee, R. Krishnan, dragged it into extra time in front of about 70,000 spectators, the majority of whom were "Hijau Kuning" supporters.

In 2011, the club again qualified for the Malaysia Cup Final for the third time in a row, this time with their new coach, Mohd Azraai Khor Abdullah. They won the trophy after defeating Terengganu FA with an epic comeback. The first goal was scored by Mohd Ashaari Shamsuddin for Terengganu in the 59th minute. Negeri Sembilan used the last 10 minutes of the game to make a comeback. S. Kunanlan equalised the score in the 81st minute before Hairuddin Omar, the veteran striker, hit the winning goal for Negeri Sembilan with a beautiful volley in the 85th minute.

In the early part of the 2011 season, one of the team's all-time best coaches, Wan Jamak Wan Hassan, resigned from the club. He sees no excuses for the team's disappointing run in the Malaysia Super League and Malaysia FA Cup competitions for that season.

In 2012 Negeri Sembilan signed nine new faces, including two import players, to cover the "Hoben Jang Hoben" squad challenged in the Super League 2012 season. Two import players, a striker Jean-Emmanuel Effa Owona and a defender Gonçalves Ferreira Marquen, were offered a one-year contract as the latest additions to the backup squad to help the Jangs form a strong team.

On 7 January, Negeri Sembilan lifted the 2012 Malaysian season's opening Charity Shield when they beat Kelantan 2–1 in the match played at the National Stadium. Cameroonian striker Jean-Emmanuel Effa Owona emerged as the hero for Negeri with a brace of goals in the 31st and 63rd minutes, to erase Kelantan's earlier goal off Norshahrul Idlan.

On 6 December 2014, the president of the Negeri Sembilan Football Association announced that the Negeri Sembilan team would be known as the Negeri Sembilan Matrix from the 2015 season. This has become the privatising the Negeri Sembilan. In 2015, overally Negeri Sembilan did not play as expected. The club has invested heavily, but they were 6th in the league and knocked out early in the FA Cup. On 26 August 2015, the Negeri Sembilan Football Association disbanded the Premier League team NS Matrix, shortly after the team failed to qualify for the Malaysia Cup 2015. Also eliminated is the head coach, K. Devan.

On 25 December 2015, Negeri Sembilan successfully defeated Perlis in the Kings Gold Cup match with a 2–1 win at Tuanku Syed Putra Stadium. This success ended Negeri Sembilan's 23-year drought since 1992 and brought home the round trophy and RM40,000 in cash, while the runner-up received RM20,000 in cash.

In December 2016, the club signed several new players. Among them were Lee Tuck, Bruno Suzuki, and Nemanja Vidić. On 4 March 2017, Negeri Sembilan continued to be on the top of the Premier League when they defeated Kuala Lumpur 2–1 at the Tuanku Abdul Rahman Stadium, Paroi. Negeri Sembilan was successfully promoted to the Super League for 2018, despite only being in 5th place. The club managed to qualify for the semi finals of the FA Cup, and on 13 May 2017, the FA Cup semi-final second leg against Pahang ended with a 3–1 aggregate victory.

On 7 June 2018, the Negeri Sembilan Football Association (PBNS) lost an experienced figure when Datuk Seri Mohamad Hasan resigned as president. On 10 September, Tunku Besar of Tampin, Tunku Syed Razman Tunku Syed Idrus Al-Qadri, was elected as the new president of the Negeri Sembilan Football Association (PBNS) for the period of 2018–2021.

== 2020s (2020–present) ==
Until 2020, the team competes within the capacity of the Football Association (FA). However, the team has finally succeeded in being privatised in the football club privatisation campaign by the Football Association of Malaysia (FAM) in September 2020 and has been performing as a "Football Club" (FC) since the 2021 season.

Season 2021 was the club's third year playing in the Premier League since being relegated in 2019. On 26 December 2020, the club signed several new players. Among them were Raja Imran Shah, Raja Amin, Barathkumar Ramaloo, Aroon Kumar, Damien Lim, Saiful Ridzuwan Selamat, Annas Rahmat, and Ferris Danial. The club also signed Tasnim Fitri and Osman Yusoff. Having started the season well with an unbeaten record after six games, the club has been top of the table for several weeks. The great competitor for the team at that time was Sarawak United. That event was almost similar in 1991 when Negeri Sembilan and Sarawak competed for the top spot in League Division 2. However, Negeri Sembilan has shown dominance by winning the Premier League in the 2021 season, while Sarawak United FC placed second.

In 2022, even as a team that has just been promoted to the Super League, the club has given good competition in the league by securing the 4th position out of 12 teams. The club is only three points behind Terengganu, who are in 2nd place. This season also saw the rise of some local players who got called up from the national squad: Khuzaimi Piee and Syihan Hazmi. The encouraging performance of several other players was also the cause of NSFC's revival at that time, such as Harold Goulon, Matheus Alves and Gustavo.

In 2024, the Malaysia Super League started in May and this is the first season to have a two-year schedule, since 2007–08. This system has been changed from the old Malaysian league match schedule system, so it will coordinate the same scheduling with the AFC calendar. Also, On January 12, Faliq Firdaus was appointed as the new chief executive officer of Negeri Sembilan FC. He became the youngest CEO in the Malaysia Super League competition for the 2024–25 season.

On 12 June 2025, Negeri Sembilan appointed YAB Dato’ Seri Utama Hj Aminuddin bin Harun, the First Minister of Negeri Sembilan, as the club’s new chairman. The announcement was made by YTM Tunku Syed Razman, the Tunku Besar of Tampin and President of the Negeri Sembilan Football Association (PBNS). The appointment reflects a strategic effort to strengthen football governance in the state, with PBNS focusing on grassroots development while Negeri Sembilan operates as a competitive professional entity. Dato’ Seri Aminuddin expressed his commitment to revitalising Negeri Sembilan and uniting the community through football.

On 13 June 2025, Negeri Sembilan FC appointed Mohd Nidzam Jamil as the head coach of their Malaysia Super League team for the 2025–26 season. The appointment was officially announced by the club's chairman, YAB Dato’ Seri Aminuddin bin Harun, as part of NSFC's long-term strategic plan to build a more competitive and sustainable team.

On 14 June 2025, Negeri Sembilan FC announced the signing of three key players on free transfers for the 2025–26 season — national team forward Luqman Hakim from KV Kortrijk, goalkeeper Muhd Azri Abd Ghani from Kuala Lumpur City, and defender Ahmad Khuzaimi Piee from Selangor. The move, confirmed by club president Datuk Seri Aminuddin Harun, reflects the club’s intent to improve after finishing 12th in the previous Malaysia Super League campaign.

25 August 2025 – In a dramatic Malaysia Super League clash at the Tuanku Abdul Rahman Stadium in Paroi, Negeri Sembilan came from behind to defeat Selangor 2–1. Selangor went ahead through Richmond Ankrah in the 13th minute, but Negeri Sembilan fought back in the second half, with Mio Tsuneyasu equalising in the 83rd minute before netting the winner in the 90+3rd minute to complete the comeback. The match attracted 25,550 spectators, the last time Negeri Sembilan recorded more than 20,000 in attendance was on 11 May 2022, when 22,224 fans watched their clash against Johor Darul Ta’zim.

For the first time, Negeri Sembilan held the NSFC Player Awards (APNSFC) for 2025–26 season to recognise and honour the club's top-performing players and individuals for their achievements throughout the season. The awards comprised Best Player, Best Young Player, Best Goal, Best Assist, Unsung Hero and Fans' Award.

On 26 June 2026, Negeri Sembilan announced the appointment of Daniel Giménez Alcañiz as the club's new head coach for the 2026–27 season, replacing interim head coach Rajan Koran.

On 31 July 2026, Aminuddin Harun resigned as chairman of Negeri Sembilan FC after serving in the position since June 2025. His resignation was accepted by the club, with Tunku Syed Razman Tunku Syed Idrus Al-Qadri appointed as acting chairman. Later on 14 August 2026, YAB Dato' Haji Ismail Lasim was appointed as the new chairman of Negeri Sembilan FC, succeeding YAB Dato' Seri Utama Haji Aminuddin Harun.

== Names ==
- 1921–2005: Negeri Sembilan

In tournaments the Negeri Sembilan Football Association only used Negeri Sembilan or Negri Sembilan as the team name. Negeri Sembilan is the name of one of the states in Malaysia, and the Negeri Sembilan Football Association is the governing body of football, founded to represent the state. The team used it from 1921 through 2004.

- 2005–2008: Negeri Sembilan Naza

Negeri Sembilan was rebranded in 2005. The team, sponsored by a motor company named Naza, started in 2005.

- 2009–2014: Negeri Sembilan

In 2009, Naza withdrew from sponsoring the Negeri Sembilan football team. The team changed the name back to Negeri Sembilan for the 2009 league season. They have used it until 2014.

- 2015: Negeri Sembilan Matrix

On 6 December 2014, the president of the Negeri Sembilan Football Association (PBNS) announced the team's new branding by changing it to Negeri Sembilan Matrix, or simply NS Matrix, with a larger amount of sponsorship from Matrix Concepts Holdings Berhad. Unfortunately, on 25 August 2015, NS Matrix was disbanded for not meeting the expectations set by PBNS.

- 2016–2020: Negeri Sembilan

Due to the disbandment of NS Matrix in the previous year, the team used the Negeri Sembilan name again starting in 2016. The team used it until 2020, when they registered as a private club.

- 2020–present: Negeri Sembilan F.C.

To achieve the targeted standards and the campaign implemented by the Football Association of Malaysia (FAM), Negeri Sembilan privatised. Previously operating as a football association, the team has started a new chapter.

== Crest and colours ==
=== Crest history ===
==== NSFA (–2014) ====
The Negeri Sembilan FA takes inspiration from the coat of arms of Negeri Sembilan. There are several important parts of the Negeri Sembilan coat of arms that are placed on the Negeri Sembilan FA team crest. It is believed that the Negeri Sembilan team crest has been in use for a long time, until 2014. In that year, the NSFA crest was modified at the suggestion of the team president at that time, Mohamad Hasan.

Escutcheon: The escutcheon of the arms is depicted as an Old French shield outlined in black. The shield itself is coloured in shades of the Minangkabau people's traditional colours, like the flag, but is illustrated in the form of three partitions separated by diagonal lines running from the upper left to the lower right and varies slightly by its symbolisation.

Rice stalks: Nine yellow stalks of rice attached to the motto in the form a white scroll with "P.B.N.S" which is an abbreviation for "Persatuan Bola Sepak Negeri Sembilan" (English: Negeri Sembilan Football Association). The stalks signifies the nine states under the old Negeri Sembilan: Jelai, Jelebu, Johol, Kelang (now part of Selangor), Naning (now part of Malacca), Rembau, Segamat-Pasir Besar, Sungei Ujong, and Ulu Pahang.

==== NSFA (2014–2021) ====
Dato' Seri Utama Haji Mohamad bin Hasan changed the team's crest in 2014. The new crest is almost identical to the old crest, but only a few things have changed:

Crossed Keris: The old crest only featured two crossed keris sheaths, but it has been improved by adding two blades of keris to the crest. These two blades and their sheaths are crossed to show the teamwork and fighting spirit of the Negeri Sembilan players.

Red ribbon: Dato' Seri Utama Haji Mohamad bin Hasan has given the idea to place a red ribbon written "EST. 1923" which means established since 1923. This red ribbon has white stripes on the sides, placed at the bottom of the crest.

==== NSFC crest (2021–present) ====
After being privatised, Negeri Sembilan started using the new crest designed by Azral Ramlay, which has been used by the team since 2020.

Rice stalks: The main crest displays nine white rice stalks tied with red rope into one in the middle, symbolising the nine states in the old Negeri Sembilan: Jelai, Jelebu, Johol, Kelang, Naning, Rembau, Segamat-Pasir Besar, Sungei Ujong, and Ulu Pahang.

Circle: The basic shape, which is a golden yellow circle in the royal color, symbolises the strong unity between the team, players, supporters, and the people under the auspices of D.Y.M.M. Yang Di-Pertuan Besar Negeri Sembilan Darul Khusus.

Escutcheon: The escutcheon of the arms is depicted as an Old French shield outlined in black. The three basic colours of Negeri Sembilan symbolise all the people, players, and supporters coming together to protect the team, along with the lyrics of the Negeri Sembilan song, "Musuhnya Habis Binasa" (English: "His enemies perished").

=== Colours and kits history ===
Red, yellow and black: Negeri Sembilan uses three colours from the state flag as its official colours. Based on the flag, the yellow represents the Yang di-Pertuan Besar of Negeri Sembilan, the black symbolises the four undangs (traditional chiefs), and the red denotes the citizens of the state. However, in context of football, yellow represents the team, black symbolises the players, and red the supporters.

Mostly, the team uses red as the dominant colour for the home kit with the addition of some yellow and black colors, while for the away kit, the dominant colour is yellow with the addition of red and black. Sometimes the team reverses yellow as the home kit colour and red as the away kit colour. As for the team's third kit, there are several dominant colour variations, such as white, blue, and black.

Notes: To view kits from 1990–present, see Negeri Sembilan seasons.
Years	Kit sponsors	Home	Away	Third
1980	Umbro	Red		
1981-1982	Mitre	Red	Yellow	
1983-1985	Schwarzenbach	Red	Yellow	
1986	Diadora	Red	Yellow	
1987	Diadora	Red	Yellow	
1988	Diadora	Red	Yellow	
1989	Puma	Red	Yellow	
1990	Mizuno	White		
1991	Mizuno	White	Yellow	—
1992	Mizuno	White	Red	—
1993	Adidas	White	Yellow	—
1994	Adidas	White	Yellow	Red
1995	Adidas	White	Yellow	
1996	Adidas	Red	Yellow	
1997	Adidas	Red	Yellow	Black & white
1998	Adidas	White	Red	Black & white
1999	Adidas	White & red	Blue	
2000	Mizuno	Red	White	Blue & green
2001	Line 7	Red	Blue	—
2002	Line 7	Red (Note: Home kit for early 2002 season)		
2002	J-King	Red		
2003	J-King	Red	White	
2004	J-King	Red	White	Blue
2005	Lotto	Red	Yellow	—
2005–06	Lotto	Red (Note: There were 2 versions, one for early 2005–06 season and one until the end of season, both red.)	White (Note: There were 2 versions, one for early 2005–06 season and one until the end of season, both white.)	—
2006–07	Lotto	Red (Note: Home kit for early 2006–07 season)	Blue (Note: Away kit for early 2006–07 season)	—
2006–07	Kappa	Red	White	—
2007–08	Kappa	Red	White	—
2009	Kappa	Red	White	Yellow (Note: Kit for 2009 Malaysian Cup)
2010	Kappa	Yellow (Note: There were 2 versions, one for 2010 Super League and one for 2010 Malaysia FA Cup, both yellow.)	Red (Note: There were 2 versions, one for 2010 Super League and one for 2010 Malaysia FA Cup, both red.)	Blue
2011	Lotto	Yellow	Red	—
2012	Lotto	Yellow	Red	Blue
2013	Lotto	Yellow	Blue	—
2014	Kika	Yellow	Red	Blue
2015	Kappa	Yellow	Red	Blue
2016	Mizuno	Yellow	Red	Blue
2017	Mizuno	Yellow	Red	Blue
2018	AL Sports	Yellow	Red	White
2019	Rhino SEA	Yellow	Red	White
2020	Admiral	Yellow	Red	White
2021	Kaki Jersi	Red	Yellow	White
2022	Kaki Jersi	Red	Yellow	Black (Note: Special edition for 2022 Malaysia Cup)
2023	Kelme	Red	Yellow	—
2024–25	Kelme	Red	Blue	Yellow (Note: NSFC used 2023 away kit as their 3rd kit for 2024–25 season.)
2025–26	Warrix	Red	Yellow	Black
2026–27	Warrix	Yellow	Blue	—

== Supporters ==
Negeri Sembilan has a big fanbase in every corner of Negeri Sembilan. The loyalty of the fans was tested when the team was relegated to the 2nd-tier league and had a disappointing season, but that paid off when the team made it to the top flight and managed to win several trophies. In 2011, Negeri Sembilan set a record for the average number of supporters attending, which was around 20,000 and above, from the start of the Malaysia Cup campaign until the final round against Terengganu. In the semi-final against T-Team, more than 40,000 (Note: Actual attendance were 43,500 including Negeri Sembilan and T-Team fans.) fans filled the Paroi Stadium.

=== Chants and banners ===
Like other teams, Negeri Sembilan has several chants that are chanted by fans. The most popular chant is "Hobin jang hobin" (English:"Strike lad strike"), which is a trademark of Negeri Sembilan team. There are also chants and banners including "Ini Paroi jangan main" (English: "This is Paroi don't underestimate"), "Akan berkati sekalian yang setia" (English: "Will bless all the devotees"), "Musuhnya habis binasa", (English:"His enemies perished"), "Buffalo souljah", anmong others. In addition, there are mainstream songs by popular Malaysian singers made especially for the Negeri Sembilan team, including "Hobin Jang Hobin" by Poe and "Lagu Bola" by WARIS. and 'Musuhnya Habis Binasa' by Negeri Sembilan's own rock band, AQSA.

There is a very popular chant created by the supporters of Negeri Sembilan, the Ultras Nogori. The chant is called "Sehati Sejiwa" and has been used by most ultras in Malaysia until it was brought to the international level by Ultras Malaya. The lyrics of the chant are as follows:

"Kami turun ke stadium sehati sejiwa
Kami turun ke stadium sehati sejiwa
Ne..ge..ri
Ne..ge..ri
Sehati sejiwa"

=== Fan clubs ===
There are several fan clubs that have been established since the early 2000s.

- Ultras Nogori 9 (UN9)
- UltraJang
- Kelab e-Penyokong Bola Sepak Negeri Sembilan (N9FUTBOL.COM)
- [PSNS] Penyokong Setia Negeri Sembilan
- Soker K-N9
- State of Nine FC
- The Jangs
- Otai N9 Bola Fans
- Nogori Supporters
- Negeri Sembilan Selatan
- PD Pirates
- Info Bola Sepak Negeri Sembilan(Kelab Penyokong)
- Soghomban Corefront - SCF
- Seberang Grandstand - atas
- STATE of NINE - SYS
- Negeri Nine
- Naning Media
- Black Blood Boys
- Moncheh Black Armour
- Team N9FC
- Nismilan - 1923
- Supporter Negeri Sembilan FC
- Media Kito Syapalikh TV
- Penyokong Bola Sepak Negeri Sembilan (Bahagian Sikamat)
- N9JC - Negeri Sembilan Jersey Collectors

=== Awards ===
- 2025–26 Malaysian League Best Supporters by MFL

== Grounds ==
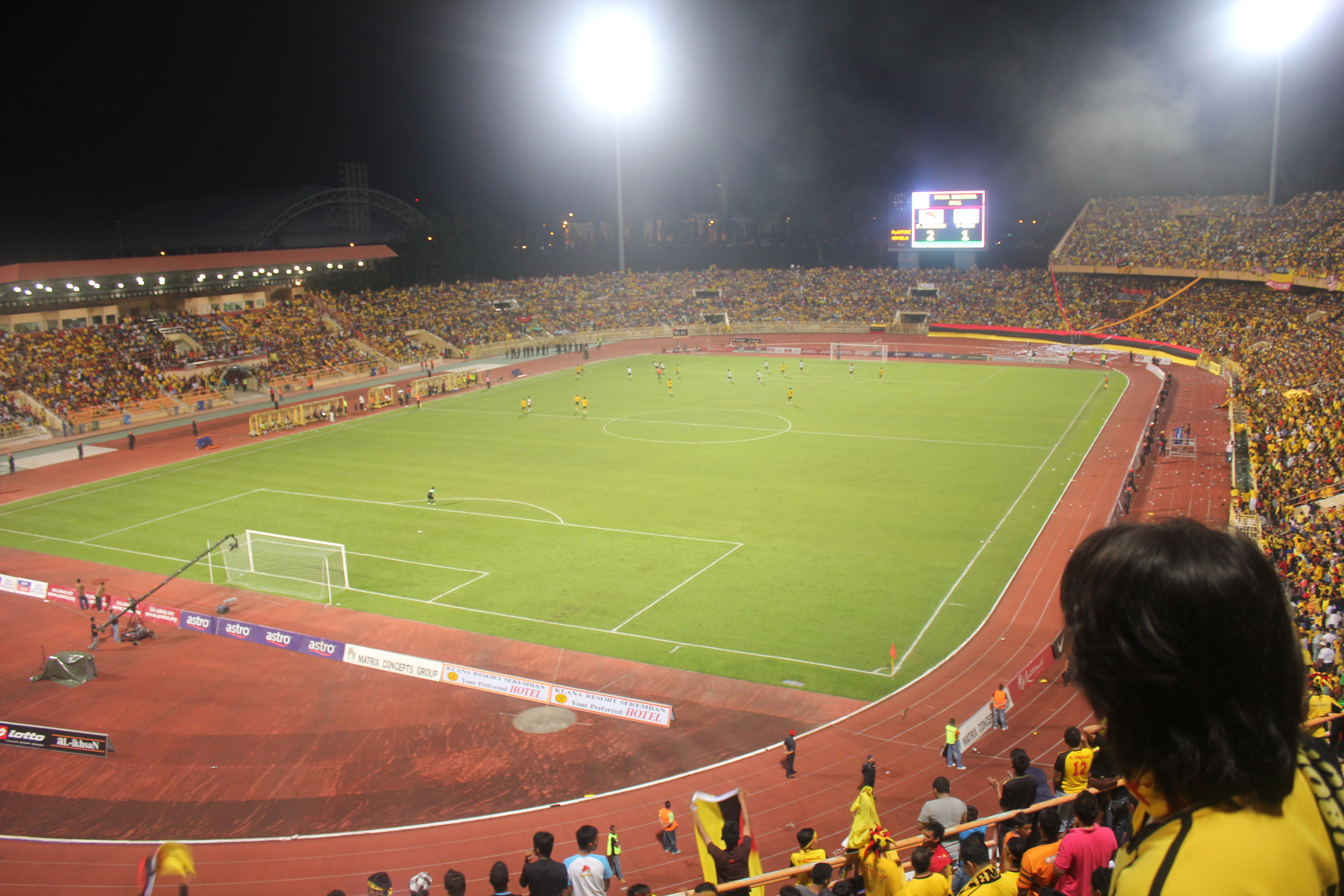
Tuanku Abdul Rahman Stadium – the current home of Negeri Sembilan FC

#	Stadium	Year
1	Seremban Municipal Council Field (Padang Station)	1921–1981
2	Kuala Pilah Stadium (interim)	1981–1982
3	Seremban Municipal Council Stadium (Padang Station)	1982–1992
4	Tuanku Abdul Rahman Stadium	1992–present

=== 1921–1981: Seremban Municipal Council Field (Padang Station) ===
Around the 1940s, Negeri Sembilan started playing at Seremban Municipal Council Field (Malay: Padang Majlis Perbandaran Seremban) since it was built by the British Resident of Negeri Sembilan, John Vincent Cowgill, in the early 1940. Seremban Municipal Council Field, or better known as Padang Stesyen (English: Station Field) because it was located next to the Seremban railway station, has a sweet history for Negeri Sembilan since it was the first venue where the HMS Malaya Cup was lifted by the team. In the beginning, this field did not have seating facilities, and spectators only sat on the sides of the field. In 1960, after Independence Day, this field was upgraded by building 500 seats that can accommodate about 5,000 people.

In 1973, Padang Stesyen was upgraded to allow the field to be used for the Field Hockey World Cup in 1975, when Malaysia was chosen as the host country and Padang Stesyen became one of the competition venues. At this time the seats were increased to 5,000 uncovered seats, which made Padang Stesyen famous at the time due to the good pitch conditions for a world-class tournament.

=== 1981–1982: Kuala Pilah Stadium ===
From 1981 to 1982, the Negeri Sembilan team used the Kuala Pilah Mini Stadium (or simply Kuala Pilah Stadium) as their temporary home ground. The stadium located in Kuala Pilah was used because Padang Station was being upgraded at that time. The 2–1 victory over defending champions Selangor in 1982 remains Kuala Pilah’s greatest footballing upset. Striker Zahariman Alias scored both goals in a thrilling Malaysia Cup encounter.

=== 1982–1992: Seremban Municipal Council Stadium ===
In 1982, Padang Stesyen was upgraded by the Negeri Sembilan government due to Seremban being upgraded as a city. This also caused the name of the field to be changed to Seremban Municipal Council Stadium (Malay: Stadium Majlis Perbandaran Seremban). The Negeri Sembilan team reused this field as their home ground until 1992, when that was the last year the team used the stadium, and it became the starting point for the revival of the Negeri Sembilan team. This iconic stadium was later demolished to make way for the development of Seremban and construction of a shopping centre in 1993.

=== 1992-present: Tuanku Abdul Rahman Stadium ===
The Tuanku Abdul Rahman Stadium (STAR) (Malay: Stadium Tuanku Abdul Rahman), also known by its informal name Stadium Paroi and nickname "The STAR of Paroi," is a multi-purpose stadium in Paroi, Negeri Sembilan, Malaysia. Inaugurated in 1992, the stadium initially held a capacity of 20,000 people. Negeri Sembilan has been using the STAR as their home ground since 1992, and this stadium has been the place where various glorious histories of the Negeri Sembilan team were created. The stadium is named in honour of Tuanku Abdul Rahman ibni Almarhum Tuanku Muhammad, the eighth Yamtuan Besar of Seri Menanti, the second Yamtuan Besar of modern-day Negeri Sembilan, and the first Yang di-Pertuan Agong of Malaysia. In 2004, the capacity of the stadium had been upgraded to 45,000 people for the hosting of the 2004 Sukma Games. In 2025, seats were installed in the stands, and the stadium’s capacity was reduced to 25,550 to ensure greater comfort for the fans attending the matches.

== Honours ==
Negeri Sembilan have won 9 major trophies.

Negeri Sembilan honours
Type	Competition	Titles	Seasons
Domestic	Malaysia Super League	1	2005–06
Domestic	Semi-Pro League 2 / Premier League	2	1991, 2021
Domestic	Malaysia Cup	3	1948, 2009, 2011
Domestic	Malaysia FA Cup	2	2003, 2010
Domestic	Malaysia Charity Cup	1	2012

=== Malaysia Super League ===
- Champions of 2005–06 Malaysia Super League

Negeri Sembilan won their first-ever Malaysia Super League title in the 2005–06 season under coach K. Devan. The team showed consistent performance throughout the campaign, finishing ahead of strong rivals like Perlis and Selangor. Key players such as Rezal Zambery Yahya, Shukor Adan, and Christian Bekamenga played crucial roles in securing the title. Their success was built on tactical discipline, a strong defence, and effective teamwork. The title marked a historic achievement for the club and elevated their status in Malaysian football.

=== Malaysia Premier League / Liga Semi-Pro Semi-Pro League 2 ===
- Champions of 1991 Malaysia Semi-Pro Division 2 League

Negeri Sembilan won the 1991 Semi-Pro League Division 2 title after a tense title race with Sarawak, their closest rival for the top spot. On 18 August, both teams met in a decisive final match, with Negeri Sembilan needing only a draw and Sarawak requiring a win to leapfrog them. The match ended 2–2, enough to crown Negeri Sembilan as champions and earn promotion to Division 1. Key players included Miroslav Bozik, Robert Bozik, Marian Valach, Richard Scully, and Nazari Hussein.

- Champions of 2021 Malaysia Premier League

Negeri Sembilan won the 2021 Malaysia Premier League under coach K. Devan, securing promotion to the Super League after a 4–2 win over PDRM on the final day. Led by captain Zaquan Adha, the team showed strong performances throughout the season, with key contributions from players like Alain Akono and Bae Beom-geun. The title ended their long wait for a major honour and marked a successful return to top-tier football.

=== Malaysia Cup ===
- Champions of 1948 Malaysia Cup vs Selangor

Negeri Sembilan’s first Malaysia Cup (then known as the Malaya Cup) triumph came in 1948, when they played at Seremban Station Padang and ended in a 2–2 draw. Finally on 2nd October 1948, they defeated Selangor 2–1 in the replay final held at the Victoria Institution Padang. It was a historic victory as it marked the state’s first major success in Malayan football, led by a team of local talents in the post-war era.

- Champions of 2009 Malaysia Cup vs Kelantan FA

The second title came 61 years later in 2009, when Negeri Sembilan lifted the Malaysia Cup after a 3–1 win over Kelantan at the Bukit Jalil National Stadium. Led by coach Wan Jamak Wan Hassan, the team was inspired by key players such as Zaquan Adha, Aidil Zafuan, and Hairuddin Omar, who scored in the final. The win ended a decades-long wait and sparked major celebrations among their supporters.

- Champions of 2011 Malaysia Cup vs Kelantan FA

Negeri Sembilan claimed their third Malaysia Cup title in 2011, once again defeating Kelantan, this time 2–1 in the final. Under coach Azraai Khor, the team made a dramatic comeback after trailing 0–1, with goals from S. Kunalan and Hairuddin Omar securing the win. The 2011 victory confirmed Negeri Sembilan's resurgence as one of the country’s top teams in the modern era.

=== Malaysia FA Cup ===
- Champions of 2003 Malaysia FA Cup vs Perlis FA

Negeri Sembilan won their first Malaysia FA Cup title in 2003 after defeating Perlis 1–0 in the final. The closely contested match was decided by a goal from Khairul Anuar Baharom, giving Negeri Sembilan their maiden FA Cup triumph and a major boost in the early 2000s era.

- Champions of 2010 Malaysia FA Cup vs Kelantan FA

The second FA Cup title came in 2010, when Negeri Sembilan edged Kelantan 5–4 in a dramatic penalty shootout after a goalless draw in the final. Farizal Marlias was the hero of the night, making key saves in the shootout to secure the victory. The win added another major trophy to the team's growing list of honours during a successful period in the late 2000s.

=== Malaysia Charity Cup ===
- Champions of 2012 Malaysia Charity Cup vs Kelantan FA

Negeri Sembilan won the 2012 Malaysia Charity Cup (Piala Sumbangsih) after defeating Liga Super champions Kelantan 2–1. The match marked the curtain-raiser for the 2012 Malaysian football season and showcased Negeri Sembilan’s strong momentum, following their 2011 Malaysia Cup triumph. Goals from Shahurain Abu Samah and Jean-Emmanuel Effa Owona sealed the victory, giving the team their first ever Charity Cup title.

== Key people ==
List of Negeri Sembilan Football Association (PBNS) presidents.

Date	Name	Note
1969–1978	(Malaysia) Wan Salaidin Wan Ismail	
1978–1982	(Malaysia) Tan Sri Dato' Seri Utama Dr. Rais bin Yatim	
1982–2004	(Malaysia) Tan Sri Mohd Isa Bin Abdul Samad	
2004–2018	(Malaysia) Datuk Seri Mohamad Haji Hassan	
2018–present	(Malaysia) Tunku Syed Razman ibni al-Marhum Tunku Syed 'Idrus al-Qadri	Who also serves as Chairman of NSFC from 2021–2025

List of Negeri Sembilan Football Club (NSFC) chairmens.

Date	Name	Note
2021–2025	(Malaysia) Tunku Syed Razman ibni al-Marhum Tunku Syed 'Idrus al-Qadri	Served as the president of PBNS since 2018
2025–2026	(Malaysia) YAB Dato' Seri Utama Haji Aminuddin Harun	
2026–present	(Malaysia) YAB Dato' Haji Ismail Lasim	

== Coaches ==
List of Negeri Sembilan FC (NSFC) coaches/managers.

Tenure	Coach	Notes
1981–1982	(Malaysia) Tony Chia	
1983–1984	(Malaysia) Zainuddin Hussein	13th in 1983 Liga Malaysia
1983–1984	(Malaysia) Zainuddin Hussein	9th in 1984 Liga Malaysia
1985–1986	(Malaysia) Tony Chia (Note: Second time being appointed as head coach, having last served from 1981 to 1982.)	12th in 1985 Liga Malaysia
1985–1986	(Malaysia) Tony Chia	15th in 1986 Liga Malaysia
1987	(Brazil) Manilton Santos	16th in 1987 Liga Malaysia
1987	(Malaysia) Tony Chia (Note: Appointed as the head coach on July 1987, during the ongoing season. Also, third time being appointed as head coach, having last served from 1985 to 1986.)	16th in 1987 Liga Malaysia
1988–1989	(Malaysia) Zainuddin Hussein	10th in 1988 Liga Malaysia
1989	(Malaysia) M. Kuppan (Note: Appointed as the head coach on September 1989, during the ongoing season.)	7th in 1989 Liga Semi-Pro 2 (1st season in Liga Semi-Pro 2)
1990–1991	(Malaysia) Ruslan Yaakob	3rd in 1990 Liga Semi-Pro 2
1990–1991	(Malaysia) Ruslan Yaakob	Led 1990 FA Cup until 1st round
1990–1991	(Malaysia) Ruslan Yaakob	Champions of 1991 Liga Semi-Pro 2
1990–1991	(Malaysia) Ruslan Yaakob	Led 1991 Malaysia Cup until group stage
1990–1991	(Malaysia) Ruslan Yaakob	Led 1991 FA Cup until 1st round
1992–1993	(Slovakia) Josef Herel	3rd in 1992 Liga Semi-Pro 1 (1st season in Liga Semi-Pro 1)
1992–1993	(Slovakia) Josef Herel	Led 1992 Malaysia Cup until group stage
1992–1993	(Slovakia) Josef Herel	Led 1992 FA Cup until 1st round
1992–1993	(Slovakia) Josef Herel	10th in 1993 Liga Semi-Pro 1
1992–1993	(Slovakia) Josef Herel	Led 1992 FA Cup until semi-finals
1994–1998	(Malaysia) M. Karathu	12th in 1994 Liga Perdana (1st season in Liga Perdana)
1994–1998	(Malaysia) M. Karathu	11th in 1995 Liga Perdana
1994–1998	(Malaysia) M. Karathu	3rd in 1996 Liga Perdana
1994–1998	(Malaysia) M. Karathu	Led 1996 Malaysia Cup until group stage
1994–1998	(Malaysia) M. Karathu	7th in 1997 Liga Perdana
1994–1998	(Malaysia) M. Karathu	Led 1997 Malaysia Cup until group stage
1994–1998	(Malaysia) M. Karathu	Led 1997 FA Cup until quarter-finals
1994–1998	(Malaysia) M. Karathu	9th in 1998 Liga Perdana 1 (1st season in Liga Perdana 1)
1994–1998	(Malaysia) M. Karathu	Led 1998 Malaysia Cup until semi-finals
1994–1998	(Malaysia) M. Karathu	Led 1998 FA Cup until 2nd round
1999	(Malaysia) Irfan Bakti Abu Salim	3rd in 1999 Liga Perdana 1
1999	(Malaysia) Irfan Bakti Abu Salim	Led 1999 Malaysia Cup until semi-finals
1999	(Malaysia) Irfan Bakti Abu Salim	Led 1999 FA Cup until semi-finals
2000–2002	(Malaysia) Mohd Zaki Sheikh Ahmad	6th in 2000 Liga Perdana 1
2000–2002	(Malaysia) Mohd Zaki Sheikh Ahmad	Runner-up of 2000 Malaysia Cup
2000–2002	(Malaysia) Mohd Zaki Sheikh Ahmad	Led 2000 FA Cup until quarter-finals
2000–2002	(Malaysia) Mohd Zaki Sheikh Ahmad	8th in 2001 Liga Perdana 1
2000–2002	(Malaysia) Mohd Zaki Sheikh Ahmad	Led 2001 Malaysia Cup until 3rd round
2000–2002	(Malaysia) Mohd Zaki Sheikh Ahmad	Led 2001 FA Cup until quarter-finals
2000–2002	(Malaysia) Mohd Zaki Sheikh Ahmad	14th in 2002 Liga Perdana 1 (relegated to Liga Perdana 2)
2000–2002	(Malaysia) Mohd Zaki Sheikh Ahmad	Led 2002 FA Cup until 2nd round
2003–2006	(Malaysia) K. Devan	2nd in 2003 Liga Perdana 2 (1st season in Liga Perdana 2)
2003–2006	(Malaysia) K. Devan	Led 2003 Malaysia Cup until group stage
2003–2006	(Malaysia) K. Devan	Champions of 2003 FA Cup
2003–2006	(Malaysia) K. Devan	4th in 2004 Premier League (1st season in Malaysia Premier League)
2003–2006	(Malaysia) K. Devan	Led 2004 AFC Cup until group stage
2003–2006	(Malaysia) K. Devan	Led 2004 Malaysia Cup until quarter-finals
2003–2006	(Malaysia) K. Devan	Led 2004 FA Cup until quarter-finals
2003–2006	(Malaysia) K. Devan	Runner-up of 2004 Charity Shield
2003–2006	(Malaysia) K. Devan	Champions of 2005–06 Super League (1st season in Malaysia Super League)
2003–2006	(Malaysia) K. Devan	Runner-up of 2006 Malaysia Cup
2003–2006	(Malaysia) K. Devan	Led 2006 FA Cup until 1st round
2006–2007	(Tunisia) Hatem Souissi	11th in 2006–07 Super League
2006–2007	(Tunisia) Hatem Souissi	Led 2007 AFC Cup until group stage
2006–2007	(Tunisia) Hatem Souissi	Led 2007 Malaysia Cup until quarter-finals
2006–2007	(Tunisia) Hatem Souissi	Led 2007 FA Cup until 2nd round
2007–2011	(Malaysia) Wan Jamak Wan Hassan	2nd in 2007–08 Super League
2007–2011	(Malaysia) Wan Jamak Wan Hassan	Led 2008 Malaysia Cup until group stage
2007–2011	(Malaysia) Wan Jamak Wan Hassan	Led 2008 FA Cup until 2nd round
2007–2011	(Malaysia) Wan Jamak Wan Hassan	7th in 2009 Super League
2007–2011	(Malaysia) Wan Jamak Wan Hassan	Champions of 2009 Malaysia Cup
2007–2011	(Malaysia) Wan Jamak Wan Hassan	Led 2009 FA Cup until semi-finals
2007–2011	(Malaysia) Wan Jamak Wan Hassan	6th in 2010 Super League
2007–2011	(Malaysia) Wan Jamak Wan Hassan	Runner-up of 2010 Malaysia Cup
2007–2011	(Malaysia) Wan Jamak Wan Hassan	Champions of 2010 FA Cup
2007–2011	(Malaysia) Wan Jamak Wan Hassan	Runner-up of 2010 Charity Shield
2007–2011	(Malaysia) Wan Jamak Wan Hassan	N/A(matchday 7) in 2011 Super League (last match on 12 March 2011)
2007–2011	(Malaysia) Wan Jamak Wan Hassan	Led 2011 FA Cup until 2nd round
2011–2012	(Malaysia) Azraai Khor (Note: Appointed as the head coach on 21 March 2011, during the ongoing season.)	8th in 2011 Super League
2011–2012	(Malaysia) Azraai Khor	Champions of 2011 Malaysia Cup
2011–2012	(Malaysia) Azraai Khor	6th in 2012 Super League
2011–2012	(Malaysia) Azraai Khor	Led 2012 Malaysia Cup until quarter-finals
2011–2012	(Malaysia) Azraai Khor	Led 2012 FA Cup until 1st round
2011–2012	(Malaysia) Azraai Khor	Champions of 2012 Charity Shield
2013	(Portugal) Divaldo Alves	12th(matchday 16) in 2013 Super League (last match on 10 May 2013)
2013	(Portugal) Divaldo Alves	Led 2013 FA Cup until quarter-finals
2013	(Malaysia) Ridzuan Abu Shah (Note: Appointed as the caretaker on 14 May 2013, during the ongoing season.) (caretaker)	12th in 2013 Super League (relegated to Premier League)
2013	(Malaysia) Ridzuan Abu Shah (caretaker)	Led 2013 Malaysia Cup until group stage
2014	(Singapore) V. Sundramoorthy	6th in 2014 Premier League
2014	(Singapore) V. Sundramoorthy	Led 2014 Malaysia Cup until play-off
2014	(Singapore) V. Sundramoorthy	Led 2014 FA Cup until 1st round
2015	(Malaysia) K. Devan (Note: Second time being appointed as head coach, having last served from 2003 to 2006.)	6th in 2015 Premier League
2015	(Malaysia) K. Devan	Led 2015 Malaysia Cup until play-off
2015	(Malaysia) K. Devan	Led 2015 FA Cup until 2nd round
2016	(Australia) Gary Michael Phillips	4th in 2016 Premier League
2016	(Australia) Gary Michael Phillips	Led 2016 Malaysia Cup until quarter-finals
2016	(Australia) Gary Michael Phillips	Led 2016 FA Cup until 3rd round
2017	(Malaysia) Asri Ninggal	5th in 2017 Premier League (promoted to Super League)
2017	(Malaysia) Asri Ninggal	Led 2017 Malaysia Cup until group stage
2017	(Malaysia) Asri Ninggal	Led 2017 FA Cup until semi-finals
2018	(Germany) Jörg Steinebrunner	11th(matchday 4) in 2018 Super League (last match on 23 February 2018)
2018	(Malaysia) Azraai Khor (Note: Appointed as the head coach on 28 February 2018, during the ongoing season. Also, second time being appointed as head coach, having last served from 2011 to 2012.)	12th(matchday 9) in 2018 Super League (last match on 5 May 2018)
2018	(Malaysia) Azraai Khor	Led 2018 FA Cup until 2nd round
2018	(Portugal) Mário Lemos (Note: Appointed as the head coach on 11 May 2018, during the ongoing season.)	12th in 2018 Super League (relegated to Premier League)
2018	(Portugal) Mário Lemos	Led 2018 Challenge Cup until group stage
2019	(Malaysia) Mat Zan Mat Aris	4th in 2019 Premier League
2019	(Malaysia) Mat Zan Mat Aris	Led 2019 Malaysia Cup until group stage
2019	(Malaysia) Mat Zan Mat Aris	Led 2019 FA Cup until 2nd round
2020	(Malaysia) Sazali Saidon	11th in 2020 Premier League
2020	(Malaysia) Sazali Saidon	Led 2020 Malaysia Cup until group stage
2020	(Malaysia) Sazali Saidon	Led 2020 FA Cup until 2nd round
2021–2023	(Malaysia) K. Devan (Note: Third time being appointed as head coach, having last served in 2015)	Champions of 2021 Premier League (promoted to Super League)
2021–2023	(Malaysia) K. Devan	Led 2021 Malaysia Cup until group stage
2021–2023	(Malaysia) K. Devan	4th in 2022 Super League
2021–2023	(Malaysia) K. Devan	Led 2022 Malaysia Cup until quarter-finals
2021–2023	(Malaysia) K. Devan	Led 2022 FA Cup until 1st round
2021–2023	(Malaysia) K. Devan	9th in 2023 Super League
2021–2023	(Malaysia) K. Devan	Led 2023 Malaysia Cup until round of 16
2021–2023	(Malaysia) K. Devan	Led 2023 FA Cup until quarter-finals
2024	(Malaysia) Azzmi Aziz	12th(matchday 8) in 2024–25 Super League (last match on 11 August 2024)
2024	(Malaysia) Azzmi Aziz	Led 2024 FA Cup until round of 16
2024–2025	(Malaysia) K. Nanthakumar (Note: Appointed as the head coach on 15 August 2024, during the ongoing season.)	12th in 2024–25 Super League
2024–2025	(Malaysia) K. Nanthakumar	Led 2024–25 Malaysia Cup until quarter-finals
2025–2026	(Malaysia) Nidzam Jamil	9th(matchday 18) in 2025–26 Super League (last match on 21 February 2026)
2025–2026	(Malaysia) Nidzam Jamil	Led 2025–26 FA Cup until quarter-finals
2025–2026	(Malaysia) Nidzam Jamil	Led 2025–26 Malaysia Cup until quarter-finals
2026	(Malaysia) K. Rajan (Note: Appointed as the caretaker on 23 February 2026, during the ongoing season) (interim)	7th in 2025–26 Super League
2026–present	(Spain) Daniel Giménez	

== Captains ==
List of Negeri Sembilan FC (NSFC) captains and vice-captains.

Season	Captain	Vice-captain
1992	(Malaysia) Mohd Noor Yaakob	
1993	(Slovakia) Miroslav Bozik	
1994		
1995		
1996	(Malaysia) Zami Mohd Noor	(Malaysia) Rosli Omar
1997	(Malaysia) Zami Mohd Noor	(Malaysia) Rosli Omar
1998	(Malaysia) Khairil Zainal	(Malaysia) B. Rajinikandh
1999	(Malaysia) Khairul Anuar Baharom	(Malaysia) B. Rajinikandh
2000	(Malaysia) Khairul Anuar Baharom	
2001	(Malaysia) Khairul Anuar Baharom	
2002	(Malaysia) Khairul Anuar Baharom	
2003	(Malaysia) Khairul Anuar Baharom	(Malaysia) B. Rajinikandh
2004	(Malaysia) Khairul Anuar Baharom	(Malaysia) B. Rajinikandh
2005	(Malaysia) Khairul Anuar Baharom	(Malaysia) Anuar Jusoh
2005–06	(Malaysia) Khairul Anuar Baharom	(Malaysia) Anuar Jusoh
2006–07	(Malaysia) Khairul Anuar Baharom	(Malaysia) Anuar Jusoh
2007–08	(Malaysia) Rezal Zambery Yahya	
2009	(Malaysia) Rezal Zambery Yahya	(Malaysia) Shukor Adan
2010	(Malaysia) Rezal Zambery Yahya	(Malaysia) Shukor Adan
2011	(Malaysia) Shukor Adan	(Malaysia) Aidil Zafuan
2012	(Malaysia) Shukor Adan	(Malaysia) Norhafiz Zamani Misbah
2013	(Malaysia) Norhafiz Zamani Misbah	(Malaysia) Rashid Mahmud
2014	(Malaysia) Norhafiz Zamani Misbah	(Malaysia) Mohd Fauzi Nan
2015	(Malaysia) Rezal Zambery Yahya	(Malaysia) Mohd Fauzi Nan
2016	(Australia) Taylor Regan	(Malaysia) Mohd Nasriq Baharom
2017	(Malaysia) Mohd Nasriq Baharom	(Malaysia) Annas Rahmat
2018	(South Korea) Kim Do-heon	(Malaysia) Fauzan Dzulkifli
2019	(Malaysia) Norhafiz Zamani Misbah	(Malaysia) Osman Yusoff
2020	(Malaysia) Norhafiz Zamani Misbah	(Malaysia) Kaharuddin Rahman
2021	(Malaysia) Zaquan Adha	(Malaysia) Annas Rahmat
2022	(Malaysia) Zaquan Adha	(Malaysia) Nasrullah Haniff
2023	(Malaysia) Zaquan Adha	(Malaysia) Nasrullah Haniff
2024–25	(Malaysia) Nasrullah Haniff	(Malaysia) Annas Rahmat (Note: Also, R. Barathkumar as a 3rd captain.)
2025–26	(Malaysia) Khuzaimi Piee	(Japan) Takumi Sasaki (Note: Also, Azri Ghani and Hadin Azman (2025–26) as other vice captains.)
2026–27	(Malaysia) Khuzaimi Piee	(Japan) Takumi Sasaki

== Former players ==
This list features former players who have made significant contributions to the team, including key figures in its success, national team representatives, fan favourites, long-serving legends, and those who played a major role in the team’s revival.

Years	Players	Achievement	
Years	Players	Competition	Season
1940s	(Malaysia) Kwan Soon Teck	HMS Malaya Cup	1948
1950s	(Malaysia) Mok Wai Hong		
1970s	(Malaysia) Burhanuddin Joned		
1978–1986, 1988–1989	(Malaysia) B. Sathianathan		
1991–1993	(Slovakia) Miroslav Bozik	Liga Semi-Pro 2	1991
1991–1993	(Slovakia) Miroslav Bozik	Kings Gold Cup	1992
1991–1994	(Slovakia) Robert Bozik	Liga Semi-Pro 2	1991
1991–1994	(Slovakia) Robert Bozik	Kings Gold Cup	1992
1991, 1994	(Slovakia) Marian Valach	Liga Semi-Pro 2	1991
1992	(Malaysia) Lim Teong Kim	Kings Gold Cup	1992
1992–1999	(Malaysia) Faizal Zainal	Kings Gold Cup	1992
1992–1999, 2002	(Malaysia) Khairil Zainal	Kings Gold Cup	1992
1990s	(Malaysia) Yeo Swee Hock	Kings Gold Cup	1992
1993–2001, 2003–2010	(Malaysia) Ching Hong Aik	Malaysia Cup	2009
1993–2001, 2003–2010	(Malaysia) Ching Hong Aik	Super League	2005–06
1993–2001, 2003–2010	(Malaysia) Ching Hong Aik	FA Cup	2003, 2010
1994–1999, 2003–2006	(Malaysia) B. Rajinikandh	FA Cup	2003
1994–1999, 2003–2006	(Malaysia) B. Rajinikandh	Super League	2005–06
1994, 1998–2001, 2012–2013	(Malaysia) Mohd Hamsani Ahmad	Charity Cup	2012
1995–1997	(Malaysia) Azmi Mohamed		
1996	(Argentina) Jose Iriarte		
1996–1998	(Malaysia) Othman Katmon		
1996–1998	(Australia) Gus Cerro		
1996–2002	(Malaysia) Zami Mohd Noor		
1996–2001, 2007–2008	(Malaysia) Yazid Yassin		
1990s	(Malaysia) Rosli Omar		
1998	(Australia) Scott Ollerenshaw		
1998–1999	(Malaysia) Ahmad Shahrul Azhar		
1998–2004, 2007–2009	(Malaysia) Efendi Abdul Malek	Malaysia Cup	2009
1998–2004, 2007–2009	(Malaysia) Efendi Abdul Malek	FA Cup	2003
1999–2006	(Malaysia) Khairul Anuar Baharom	Super League	2005–06
1999–2006	(Malaysia) Khairul Anuar Baharom	FA Cup	2003
1999–2006	(Malaysia) Khairul Anuar Baharom	Best defender	2005–06
2000–2001, 2003	(Malaysia) Azman Adnan	FA Cup	2003
2000–2004, 2011–2014, 2019–2020	(Malaysia) Norhafiz Zamani Misbah	Malaysia Cup	2011
2000–2004, 2011–2014, 2019–2020	(Malaysia) Norhafiz Zamani Misbah	Charity Cup	2012
2000–2004, 2011–2014, 2019–2020	(Malaysia) Norhafiz Zamani Misbah	FA Cup	2003
2000–2004, 2011–2014, 2019–2020	(Malaysia) Norhafiz Zamani Misbah	Best defender	2011
2000–2001, 2009–2012	(Malaysia) Shukor Adan	Malaysia Cup	2009, 2011
2000–2001, 2009–2012	(Malaysia) Shukor Adan	FA Cup	2010
2000–2001, 2009–2012	(Malaysia) Shukor Adan	Charity Cup	2012
2001–2004	(Malaysia) K. Rajan	FA Cup	2003
2002–2010	(Malaysia) Mohd Rahman Zabul	Malaysia Cup	2009
2002–2010	(Malaysia) Mohd Rahman Zabul	FA Cup	2003, 2010
2002–2010	(Malaysia) Mohd Rahman Zabul	Super League	2005–06
2003	(Brazil) Everson Martinelli	FA Cup	2003
2003–2007	(Malaysia) Anuar Jusoh	Super League	2005–06
2003–2007	(Malaysia) Anuar Jusoh	FA Cup	2003
2004–2006	(Cameroon) Christian Bekamenga	Super League	2005–06
2004–2006	(Cameroon) Christian Bekamenga	Best foreign player	2005–06
2004–2007	(Malaysia) Azizon Abdul Kadir	Super League	2005–06
2005–2010	(Malaysia) K. Thanaraj	Malaysia Cup	2009
2005–2010	(Malaysia) K. Thanaraj	FA Cup	2010
2005–2010	(Malaysia) K. Thanaraj	Super League	2005–06
2005–2011	(Malaysia) Aidil Zafuan	Malaysia Cup	2009, 2011
2005–2011	(Malaysia) Aidil Zafuan	FA Cup	2010
2005–2011	(Malaysia) Aidil Zafuan	Super League	2005–06
2005–2011	(Malaysia) Aidil Zafuan	Best defender	2009, 2010
2005–2013	(Malaysia) Idris Abdul Karim	Malaysia Cup	2009, 2011
2005–2013	(Malaysia) Idris Abdul Karim	FA Cup	2010
2005–2013	(Malaysia) Idris Abdul Karim	Super League	2005–06
2005–2013	(Malaysia) Idris Abdul Karim	Charity Cup	2012
2005–2010, 2015	(Malaysia) Rezal Zambery Yahya	Malaysia Cup	2009
2005–2010, 2015	(Malaysia) Rezal Zambery Yahya	FA Cup	2010
2005–2010, 2015	(Malaysia) Rezal Zambery Yahya	Super League	2005–06
2005–2011, 2021–2023	(Malaysia) Zaquan Adha	Malaysia Cup	2009, 2011
2005–2011, 2021–2023	(Malaysia) Zaquan Adha	FA Cup	2010
2005–2011, 2021–2023	(Malaysia) Zaquan Adha	Super League	2005–06
2005–2011, 2021–2023	(Malaysia) Zaquan Adha	Premier League	2021
2005–2011, 2021–2023	(Malaysia) Zaquan Adha	Territory Minister Cup	2022
2005–2011, 2021–2023	(Malaysia) Zaquan Adha	Best young player	2006–07
2006–2007	(Malaysia) Liew Kit Kong		
2007–2012	(Malaysia) S. Kunanlan	Malaysia Cup	2009, 2011
2007–2012	(Malaysia) S. Kunanlan	FA Cup	2010
2007–2012	(Malaysia) S. Kunanlan	Charity Cup	2012
2007–2013, 2020	(Malaysia) Shahurain Abu Samah	Malaysia Cup	2009, 2011
2007–2013, 2020	(Malaysia) Shahurain Abu Samah	FA Cup	2010
2007–2013, 2020	(Malaysia) Shahurain Abu Samah	Charity Cup	2012
2007–2011	(Malaysia) Farizal Harun	Malaysia Cup	2009, 2011
2007–2011	(Malaysia) Farizal Harun	FA Cup	2010
2007–2014	(Malaysia) Tengku Qayyum	Malaysia Cup	2009, 2011
2007–2014	(Malaysia) Tengku Qayyum	FA Cup	2010
2007–2014	(Malaysia) Tengku Qayyum	Charity Cup	2012
2008–2014, 2019–2021	(Malaysia) Abdul Halim Zainal	Malaysia Cup	2009, 2011
2008–2014, 2019–2021	(Malaysia) Abdul Halim Zainal	FA Cup	2010
2008–2014, 2019–2021	(Malaysia) Abdul Halim Zainal	Charity Cup	2012
2008–2014, 2019–2021	(Malaysia) Abdul Halim Zainal	Premier League	2021
2009, 2011	(Malaysia) Hairuddin Omar	Malaysia Cup	2009, 2011
2009–2014	(Malaysia) Alif Samsudin	Malaysia Cup	2009, 2011
2009–2014	(Malaysia) Alif Samsudin	FA Cup	2010
2009–2014	(Malaysia) Alif Samsudin	Charity Cup	2012
2009–2023	(Malaysia) Kaharuddin Rahman	Malaysia Cup	2009, 2011
2009–2023	(Malaysia) Kaharuddin Rahman	FA Cup	2010
2009–2023	(Malaysia) Kaharuddin Rahman	Charity Cup	2012
2009–2023	(Malaysia) Kaharuddin Rahman	Premier League	2021
2009–2023	(Malaysia) Kaharuddin Rahman	Territory Minister Cup	2022
2009–2023	(Malaysia) Kaharuddin Rahman	Kings Gold Cup	2015
2011–2012	(Malaysia) Farizal Marlias	Malaysia Cup	2011
2011–2012	(Malaysia) Farizal Marlias	Charity Cup	2012
2012, 2014	(Cameroon) Jean-Emmanuel Effa Owona	Charity Cup	2012
2012, 2014	(Cameroon) Jean-Emmanuel Effa Owona	MSL golden boot	2012
2015	(Liberia) Francis Doe	Kings Gold Cup	2015
2015	(Liberia) Francis Doe	MPL golden boot	2015
2018–2019, 2022	(Malaysia) Syihan Hazmi	Best goalkeeper	2022

== Foreign players ==
Foreign players were officially allowed in Malaysian football starting in 1989 with the introduction of the Semi-Pro League, which marked the beginning of a regulated quota system. However, some teams had already fielded foreign players in the early to mid-1980s, though not under a formal structure governed by the Football Association of Malaysia (FAM). Prior to 1989, these signings were often short-term or unofficial. The foreign player ban from 2009 to 2011 was lifted in 2012, and the quota has since gradually expanded.

List of overseas players who currently and previously played for the club on a permanent transfer and on loan.

Nat	Flag	Year	Pos	Name	Age	Ref
Angola	(Angola)	2007	FW	Freddy	28	
Argentina	(Argentina)	1996–1997	FW	Jose Iriarte	30	
Argentina	(Argentina)	1997	FW	Julio Hector Ceballos		
Argentina	(Argentina)	2003	MF	Luciano Osmar	25	
Argentina	(Argentina)	2007	MF	Raul Daniel Cojan		
Argentina	(Argentina)	2013	FW	Emanuel de Porras	32	
Argentina	(Argentina)	2015	FW	Bruno Martelotto	33	
Argentina	(Argentina)	2018	FW	Nicolás Vélez	28	
Australia	(Australia)	1994	MF	Pedro Ricoy	28	
Australia	(Australia)	1996–1998	MF	Gustavo Cerro	27	
Australia	(Australia)	1997	FW	Tristam Morgan		
Australia	(Australia)	1998	FW	Scott Ollerenshaw	30	
Australia	(Australia)	2006–2008	DF	Jason Williams	25	
Australia	(Australia)	2016	FW	Andrew Nabbout	24	
Australia	(Australia)	2016	FW	Joel Chianese	26	
Australia	(Australia)	2018	DF	Taylor Regan	28	
Bosnia and Herzegovina	(Bosnia and Herzegovina)	2025–present	FW	Jovan Motika	26	
Brazil	(Brazil)	1997	MF	Airton Andrioli	32	
Brazil	(Brazil)	1998	DF	Pedro Paulo Oliveira	31	
Brazil	(Brazil)	2003	FW	Everson Martinelli	25	
Brazil	(Brazil)	2013	FW	Fábio Leandro Barbosa	35	
Brazil	(Brazil)	2016	FW	Henrique	31	
Brazil	(Brazil)	2018	DF	Alex Moraes	30	
Brazil	(Brazil)	2018	MF	Flávio Beck Júnior	31	
Brazil	(Brazil)	2019–2020	DF	Matheus Vila	27	
Brazil	(Brazil)	2019–2020	FW	Almir	34	
Brazil	(Brazil)	2019–2020	FW	Igor Luiz	30	
Brazil	(Brazil)	2021	DF	Fernando Barbosa	29	
Brazil	(Brazil)	2021	DF	Arthur Cunha	31	
Brazil	(Brazil)	2021	MF	Diogo Campos	31	
Brazil	(Brazil)	2021	FW	Rafinha	31	
Brazil	(Brazil)	2022	FW	Matheus Alves	29	
Brazil	(Brazil)	2022	FW	Gustavo	26	
Brazil	(Brazil)	2023	MF	Vinicius Leonel	26	
Brazil	(Brazil)	2023	FW	Casagrande	33	
Brazil	(Brazil)	2024–2025	FW	Ricardo Pires	37	
Cameroon	(Cameroon)	2004–2006	FW	Christian Bekamenga	18	
Cameroon	(Cameroon)	2005	FW	Anicet Eyenga	19	
Cameroon	(Cameroon)	2012, 2014	FW	Jean-Emmanuel Effa Owona	29	
Cameroon	(Cameroon)	2013	DF	William Modibo	34	
Cameroon	(Cameroon)	2021	FW	Alain Akono	25	
Croatia	(Croatia)	2014	FW	Ivan Babić	30	
Croatia	(Croatia)	2017	FW	Marko Šimić	29	
Czech Republic	(Czech Republic)	1992	FW	Milan Hanko	27	
Czech Republic	(Czech Republic)	2007	FW	Vítězslav Mooc	29	
England	(England)	1986	MF	Nicky Walsh (Note: Played before 1989, likely unofficial.)		
England	(England)	1986	MF	Carl Hoddle (Note: Played before 1989, likely unofficial.)	19	
England	(England)	2017	MF	Lee Tuck	29	
England	(England)	2026–present	MF	Anuar Ceesay	23	
Equartorial Guinea	(Equatorial Guinea)	2025–2026	DF	Luis Enrique Nsue	27	
France	(France)	2016–2017	FW	Goran Jerković	30	
France	(France)	2017	FW	Jonathan Béhé	28	
France	(France)	2022–2023	DF	Hérold Goulon	34	
Gabon	(Gabon)	2023	MF	Lévy Madinda (Note: Loaned from Johor Darul Ta'zim)	31	
Ghana	(Ghana)	2022	MF	David Mawutor	30	
Ghana	(Ghana)	2025	MF	Alex Agyarkwa (Note: Loaned from Selangor)	24	
Ghana	(Ghana)	2025–2026	FW	Joseph Esso	28	
Haiti	(Haiti)	2014–2015	MF	Jean Alexandre	28	
Italy	(Italy)	2024–2025	MF	Sebastian Avanzini	29	
Japan	(Japan)	2017	FW	Bruno Suzuki	27	
Japan	(Japan)	2019–2020	MF	Shunsuke Nakatake	29	
Japan	(Japan)	2024–present	MF	Takumi Sasaki	25	
Japan	(Japan)	2025–present	MF	Mio Tsuneyasu (Note: Loaned from Gainare Tottori. Later he signed permanently in July 2026.)	23	
Japan	(Japan)	2026–present	DF	Kei Oshiro	25	
Japan	(Japan)	2026–present	MF	Yuichi Hirano	29	
Japan	(Japan)	2026–present	FW	Yusuke Minagawa	34	
Kenya	(Kenya)	2007	FW	Eric Muranda	25	
Laos	(Laos)	2018	FW	Prak Mony Udom	24	
Latvia	(Latvia)	2018	DF	Renārs Rode	29	
Liberia	(Liberia)	1995	DF	Nathaniel Naplah	21	
Liberia	(Liberia)	2006	FW	Buston Nagbe Browne	21	
Liberia	(Liberia)	2015	FW	Francis Forkey Doe	30	
Mauritania	(Mauritania)	2026–present	FW	Aboubakar Kamara	31	
Mongolia	(Mongolia)	2025–present	DF	Filip Andersen	22	
Myanmar	(Myanmar)	2023–2025	FW	Hein Htet Aung (Note: Loaned from Selangor all season)	21	
Myanmar	(Myanmar)	2025–present	MF	Wai Linn Aung	26	
Netherland	(Netherlands)	2007	MF	Pascal Heije	28	
Nigeria	(Nigeria)	2004	GK	Cajetan Ndubuisi Oparaugo		
Nigeria	(Nigeria)	2004	FW	Abdulrazak Ekpoki	22	
Nigeria	(Nigeria)	2004	FW	Alfred Effiong	20	
Nigeria	(Nigeria)	2005	MF	Lateef Seriki	26	
Nigeria	(Nigeria)	2007	MF	Julius Ejueyitsi	23	
Nigeria	(Nigeria)	2008	FW	Udo Fortune	20	
Nigeria	(Nigeria)	2024–2025	DF	Aliyu Abubakar	27	
Palestine	(Palestine)	2022	MF	Yashir Pinto	31	
Palestine	(Palestine)	2026	MF	Oday Kharoub	32	
Philippines	(Philippines)	2018–2019	FW	Ángel Guirado	34	
Philippines	(Philippines)	2022	MF	Omid Nazari	31	
Russia	(Russia)	2016	FW	Dmitri Sychev	33	
Saint Vincent	(Saint Vincent and the Grenadines)	2005–2006	FW	Shandel Samuel	23	
Senegal	(Senegal)	2024–2025	MF	Jacque Faye	29	
Serbia	(Serbia)	2017	DF	Nemanja Vidić	26	
Sierra Leone	(Sierra Leone)	2008	MF	Lamin Conteh	32	
Sierra Leone	(Sierra Leone)	2019	FW	Thomas Koroma	26	
Singapore	(Singapore)	1989	FW	R. Suriamurthy	31	
Singapore	(Singapore)	2018	DF	Madhu Mohana	27	
Singapore	(Singapore)	2023	MF	Safuwan Baharudin	32	
Singapore	(Singapore)	2026	DF	Amirul Adli (Note: Loaned from Tampinese Rovers)	30	
Singapore	(Singapore)	2026–present	DF	Ryaan Sanizal	24	
Slovakia	(Slovakia)	1991–1993	DF	Miroslav Bôžik	32	
Slovakia	(Slovakia)	1991–1994	MF	Robert Bôžik	27	
Slovakia	(Slovakia)	1991, 1994	FW	Marian Valach	27	
Slovakia	(Slovakia)	2007–2008	DF	Marián Juhás	28	
Slovakia	(Slovakia)	2012	DF	Marian Farbák	29	
Slovakia	(Slovakia)	2014	FW	Jozef Kapláň	28	
South Africa	(South Africa)	2014–2015	FW	Philani Kubheka	35	
South Korea	(South Korea)	2014–2015	MF	Kim Jin-yong	32	
South Korea	(South Korea)	2018	MF	Kim Do-heon	36	
South Korea	(South Korea)	2021	MF	Bae Beom-geun	28	
South Korea	(South Korea)	2024–2025	FW	Lee Kwang-hui	24	
South Korea	(South Korea)	2024–2026	MF	An Sang-su	24	
South Korea	(South Korea)	2026–present	DF	Park Yi-young	32	
Spain	(Spain)	1990	FW	Juan Manu Olsson		
Spain	(Spain)	2023	FW	Youssef Ezzejjari	30	
Spain	(Spain)	2024	FW	Mika	31	
Switzerland	(Switzerland)	2016	DF	Kevin Günter (Note: Loaned from Johor Darul Ta'zim)	22	
Thailand	(Thailand)	1989	MF	Likit Sanatong		
Thailand	(Thailand)	1989	FW	Chatchaval Kenjanahoot		
Togo	(Togo)	2021	FW	Francis Koné	31	
Togo	(Togo)	2022	FW	Kossi Adetu	27	
United States	(United States)	2016	MF	Alex Smith	31	
Yugoslavia	(Socialist Federal Republic of Yugoslavia)	1990	FW	Srdjan Delibasic		
Yugoslavia	(Socialist Federal Republic of Yugoslavia)	1993	FW	Esad Sejdic		
Zambia	(Zambia)	2006	MF	Noel Rodwell Mwandila	24	

== Loyal players ==
Ching Hong Aik has played for Negeri Sembilan for 17 years.

Name	Nat	Years		Ref
Name	Nat	Senior	Since youth	Ref
Ching Hong Aik	(Malaysia)	17 years	—	
Kaharuddin Rahman	(Malaysia)	14 years	15 years	
Norhafiz Zamani Misbah	(Malaysia)	11 years	15 years	
Efendi Abdul Malek	(Malaysia)	10 years	13 years	
Abdul Halim Zainal	(Malaysia)	10 years	12 years	
Zaquan Adha	(Malaysia)	10 years	11 years	
B. Rajinikandh	(Malaysia)	10 years	—	
Mohd Rahman Zabul	(Malaysia)	9 years	11 years	
B. Sathianathan	(Malaysia)	9 years	—	
Idris Abdul Karim	(Malaysia)	9 years	—	
Tengku Qayyum	(Malaysia)	8 years	10 years	
Khairil Zainal	(Malaysia)	8 years	9 years	
Shahurain Abu Samah	(Malaysia)	8 years	—	
Khairul Anuar Baharom	(Malaysia)	8 years	—	
Hamsani Ahmad	(Malaysia)	7 years	9 years	
A. Selvan	(Malaysia)	7 years	9 years	
N. Javabilaarivin	(Malaysia)	7 years	9 years	
Faizal Zainal	(Malaysia)	7 years	8 years	
Aidil Zafuan	(Malaysia)	7 years	8 years	
K. Thanaraj	(Malaysia)	6 years	10 years	
Shukor Adan	(Malaysia)	6 years	8 years	
Alif Samsudin	(Malaysia)	6 years	8 years	

== Awards ==
=== Golden Boot Award ===
Leagues	Seasons	Players	Goals
Malaysia Super League	2012	(Cameroon) Jean-Emmanuel Effa Owona	15
Malaysia Premier League	2005	(Liberia) Francis Doe	17

=== Other player awards ===
Awards	Seasons	Players
Best Goalkeeper Award	2022	(Malaysia) Syihan Hazmi
Best Defender Award	2005–06	(Malaysia) Khairul Anuar Baharom
Best Defender Award	2009, 2010	(Malaysia) Aidil Zafuan
Best Defender Award	2011	(Malaysia) Norhafiz Zamani Misbah
Best Foreign Player	2005–06	(Cameroon) Christian Bekamenga
Best Young Player	2006–07	(Malaysia) Zaquan Adha

=== Club's top goalscorers ===
Seasons	League		All competitions	
Seasons	Players	Goals	Players	Goals
2004	(Malaysia) Shahrin Abdul Majid	11	(Malaysia) Efendi Abdul Malek	12
2005	(Cameroon) Christian Bekamenga	16	(Cameroon) Christian Bekamenga	21
2005–06	(Cameroon) Christian Bekamenga	8	(Cameroon) Christian Bekamenga	19
2006–07	(Angola) Frederico Dos Santos	9	(Angola) Frederico Dos Santos	13
2007–08	(Malaysia) Zaquan Adha	11	(Malaysia) Zaquan Adha	14
2009	(Malaysia) Zaquan Adha	11	(Malaysia) Zaquan Adha	23
2010	(Malaysia) Zaquan Adha	8	(Malaysia) Zaquan Adha	14
2011	(Malaysia) Mohd Firdaus Azizul	7	(Malaysia) Hairuddin Omar	11
2012	(Cameroon) Jean-Emmanuel Effa Owona	15	(Cameroon) Jean-Emmanuel Effa Owona	23
2013	(Malaysia) Shahurain Abu Samah	2	(Brazil) Fábio Leandro Barbosa	6
2013	(Malaysia) Rashid Mahmud	2	(Brazil) Fábio Leandro Barbosa	6
2013	(Malaysia) Nazrin Nawi	2	(Brazil) Fábio Leandro Barbosa	6
2014	(South Korea) Kim Jin-yong	8	(South Korea) Kim Jin-yong	8
2015	(Liberia) Francis Doe	17	(Liberia) Francis Doe	19
2016	(Australia) Andrew Nabbout	8	(Australia) Andrew Nabbout	9
2017	(Japan) Bruno Suzuki	11	(Japan) Bruno Suzuki	13
2018	(Argentina) Nicolás Vélez	8	(Brazil) Flávio Júnior	10
2018	(Brazil) Flávio Júnior	8	(Brazil) Flávio Júnior	10
2019	(Brazil) José Almir Barros Neto	8	(Brazil) Igor Luiz	12
2020	(Brazil) Igor Luiz	5	(Brazil) Igor Luiz	5
2021	(Cameroon) Alain Akono	9	(Cameroon) Alain Akono	9
2022	(Brazil) Gustavo	11	(Brazil) Gustavo	11
2023	(Malaysia) Shahrel Fikri	6	(Malaysia) Shahrel Fikri	7
2023	(Malaysia) Shahrel Fikri	6	(Brazil) Casagrande	7
2024–25	(Senegal) Jacque Faye	5	(Malaysia) Selvan Anbualagan	6
2025–26	(Ghana) Joseph Esso	10	(Ghana) Joseph Esso	12

=== Club awards ===
Award	Seasons	Notes
Most Favourite Football Association	2007–08	
Fair Play award	2016	

=== NSFC Player Awards ===
The NSFC Player Awards (Malay: Anugerah Pemain NSFC) or simply APNSFC is the official awards campaign by Negeri Sembilan FC to celebrate the squad's dedication throughout the season. First held in the 2025–26 season, this award is the Negeri Sembilan fans' choice award.

Season	Best Player	Best Young Player	Best Goal	Best Assist	Unsung Hero	Fans' Award
2025–26	(Bosnia and Herzegovina) Jovan Motika	(Malaysia) Luqman Hakim	(Japan) Mio Tsuneyasu (Note: 2nd and winning goal against Selangor in match 3, Malaysia Super League.)	(Ghana) Alex Agyarkwa (Note: Assist for the 2nd goal against Johor Darul Ta'zim in Match 2, Malaysia Super League.)	(Malaysia) Azri Ghani	(Japan) Takumi Sasaki
2025–26	(Japan) Takumi Sasaki	(Malaysia) Luqman Hakim	(Japan) Mio Tsuneyasu	(Ghana) Alex Agyarkwa	(Malaysia) Azri Ghani	(Japan) Takumi Sasaki

== Sponsors and partners ==
Sponsorship is vital to Negeri Sembilan FC's growth and competitiveness, providing essential financial support for operations, player development, and marketing. The club has been backed by notable sponsors such as Telekom Malaysia, Matrix Concepts, Yakult Malaysia, and local entities like Syarikat Air Negeri Sembilan (SAINS). Kit sponsorships over the years have included international brands like Adidas and Lotto, as well as local labels such as Kaki Jersi and J King. Since its privatisation in 2020, the club has adopted a more strategic approach to commercial partnerships, introducing sleeve sponsors as early as 2019 and, for the first time, a back sponsor in the 2024–25 season.

=== Sponsors ===
History of Negeri Sembilan sponsors.

Year	Kit sponsor	Sponsors			
Year	Kit sponsor	Main/Shirt	Sleeve/Shoulder		Back
Year	Kit sponsor	Main/Shirt	Right	Left	Back
1990–1992	(Japan) Mizuno	Dunhill / EON	—	—	—
1993	(Germany) Adidas	Dunhill / EON	—	—	—
1994–1999	(Germany) Adidas	Dunhill	—	—	—
2000	(Japan) Mizuno	Dunhill	—	—	—
2001	(France) Line 7	Dunhill	—	—	—
2002–2004	J-King	Dunhill	—	—	—
2005	J-King (Italy) Lotto	TM Net	—	—	—
2005–2007	(Italy) Lotto	TM / Naza	—	—	—
2007	(Italy) Kappa	TM / Naza	—	—	—
2009–2010	(Italy) Kappa	TM	—	—	—
2011	(Italy) Lotto	—	—	—	—
2012–2013	(Italy) Lotto	Matrix Concept	—	—	—
2014	(South Korea) Kika	Matrix Concept	—	—	—
2015	(Italy) Kappa	Matrix Concept	—	—	—
2016–2017	(Japan) Mizuno	Matrix Concept	—	—	—
2018	AL Sports	Matrix Concept	—	—	—
2019	(United Kingdom) Rhino SEA	Visit Negeri Sembilan / Matrix Concept	SALAM Medical Centre	Negeri Roadstone	—
2020	(United Kingdom) Admiral	Visit Negeri Sembilan / Matrix Concept	Negeri Roadstone	Gambir Emas	—
2021–2022	Kaki Jersi	Visit Negeri Sembilan / Matrix Concept	Negeri Roadstone	Gemencheh Granite	—
2023	(Spain) Kelme	Visit Negeri Sembilan / Matrix Concept	Negeri Roadstone	Gemencheh Granite	—
2024–2025	(Spain) Kelme	Matrix Concept/ Negeri Roadstone / MBI Negeri Sembilan	Seremban Engineering Berhad	Gemencheh Granite	NSFC Sport Physio Centre / IRC Negeri Sembilan
2025–2026	(Thailand) Warrix	Matrix Concept/ Negeri Roadstone / MBI Negeri Sembilan	Seremban Engineering Berhad	Gemencheh Granite	NSFC Sport Physio Centre / IRC Negeri Sembilan
2026–present	(Thailand) Warrix	Matrix Concept/ Negeri Roadstone / MBI Negeri Sembilan	NS Corporation	Gemencheh Granite	SAINS / IRC Negeri Sembilan

=== Official sponsors & partners information ===
History of official sponsors & partners information.

Years	Sponsors/Partners	Business types	Contributions
1991–1993	EON	Dealership	Advertising on kit
1993–1999	(Germany) Adidas	Sportswear	Kit sponsor
2001	(France) Line 7	Sportswear	Kit sponsor
1991–2004	(United Kingdom) Dunhill	Tobacco	Advertising on kit
2004–2005	J-King	Sportswear	Kit sponsor
2005	TM Net	Internet provider	Advertising on kit
2005–2008	Naza	Conglomerate	Advertising on kit
2005–2010	TM	Telco	Advertising on kit
2005–2007, 2011–2013	(Italy) Lotto	Sportswear	Kit sponsor
2014	(South Korea) Kika	Sportswear	Kit sponsor
2007–2010, 2015	(Italy) Kappa	Sportswear	Kit sponsor
1991–1992, 2000, 2016–2017	(Japan) Mizuno	Sportswear	Kit sponsor
2018	AL Sports	Sportswear	Kit sponsor
2018–2019	Salam Medical Centre	Health facility	Advertising on kit
2019	(United Kingdom) Rhino SEA	Sportswear	Kit sponsor
2019	(Japan) Yakult	Beverage	Undisclosed
2019–2020	Hashtag Media	Media	Team Media
2019–2026	Kapten Gym	Gym centre	Gym facility
2020	(United Kingdom) Admiral	Sportswear	Kit sponsor
2020	GD Holdings	Real estate	Undisclosed
2020	Carpet Prima	Store	Undisclosed
2020	Gambir Emas	Nutrition	Advertising on kit
2021	Careplus (M)	Medical manufacturer	Undisclosed
2021	Urban Bash Sports	Sports marketing	Undisclosed
2021	Geomaju	Real estate	Undisclosed
2021	Poliklinik Raudhah Raisha	Health facility	Medical facility
2021–2022	Kaki Jersi	Sportswear	Kit sponsor
2021–2022	Axis Physiotherapy & Fitness Studio	Physio centre	Physio facility
2019–2023	Visit Negeri Sembilan	State council	Advertising on kit
2023	KL Kinetic	Physio centre	Physio facility
2023	TMASIXPERT TRADING	Printing	Undisclosed
2023–2025	(Spain) Kelme	Sportswear	Kit sponsor
2023–2025	One XOX	Telco	Advertising
2024–2025	Cobra Gym	Gym centre	Gym facility for U-23
2023–2026	ABSTRAX	Clothing	Undisclosed
2024–2026	Seremban Engineering Berhad	Industrial engineering	Advertising on kit
2024–2026	NSFC Sport Physio Centre by PhysioDoc	Physio centre	Advertising on kit
2024–2026	Proviton STR	Supplement	Undisclosed
2024–2026	Jantzen	Beverage	Provide drink
2012–present	Matrix Concept	Holding company	Advertising on kit
2019–present	Negeri Roadstone	Quarry	Advertising on kit
2019–2020, 2026–present	SAINS	Water utility	Advertising on kit
2020, 2024–present	ATF Sport Taping	Sports	Provide sports equipment
2021–present	Gemencheh Granite	Quarry	Advertising on kit
2022, 2024–present	IRC Negeri Sembilan	Sport facility	Advertising on kit
2023–present	UH Medical Solutions	Medical	Medical facility
2023–present	KR Tour & Travel	Travel agency	Transportation
2024–present	MBI Negeri Sembilan	State council	Advertising on kit
2024–present	Tuah Hartamas Development	Real estate	Undisclosed
2024–present	Total Protection	Insurance agency	Provide insurance
2024–present	Klana Resort Seremban	Resort	Undisclosed
2025–present	Oh! Media	Media	Media partner
2025–present	(Thailand) Warrix	Sportswear	Kit sponsor
2026–present	Trident Made by Kuckreja	Sports	Undisclosed
2026–present	Bubbles O2	Beverage	Provide drink
2026–present	(United Kingdom) STATSports	Sports data	Performance monitoring
2026–present	N-EG FUEL	Sports supplement	Provide energy gel
2026–present	NS Corporation	Government investor	Advertising on kit
2026–present	Mawar Medical Centre	Medical	Medical facility
2026–present	(Myanmar) Zora	Beverage	Provide drink
2026–present	SISJ Usahaniaga	Industrial engineering	Undisclosed
2026–present	Dai-G	LED signage	Undisclosed
2026–present	GD Holdings	Real estate	Undisclosed
2026–present	Jempol Bakery	Bakery	Undisclosed

== Affiliations ==
=== Associations ===
Name	Years
SSN Negeri Sembilan	2019–
Negeri Sembilan FA	2020–
Uitm	2023–
Kolej Yayasan Negeri Sembilan	2024–

As the largest shareholder of Negeri Sembilan Sdn. Bhd., Negeri Sembilan FA became the most important affiliate of Negeri Sembilan FC. Being the association responsible for forming and strategizing the marketing, management, and development aspects of football in Negeri Sembilan.

The NSFC–UiTM collaboration involves sharing information, expertise, and solution methods in football for the purpose of facilitating work and research processes through collaborative negotiation and consultancy activities. This collaboration also emphasises the importance of learning in the field of sports science to improve the quality of training, nutrition, and treatment of Negeri Sembilan players. In addition, being able to share infrastructure between the NSFC and the UiTM Negeri Sembilan branch.

Kolej Yayasan Negeri Sembilan (KYNS) and Negeri Sembilan Football Club (NSFC) work together in the development of local talent, in addition to providing training and education programmes to players.

Negeri Sembilan renewed its Memorandum of Understanding (MOU) with Sekolah Sukan Negeri Sembilan (SMK Za'ba, Kuala Pilah). It provides a pathway for the school's under-14 and under-17 teams

=== Football clubs ===
Name	Years
NS Chempaka	1998–2002
Betaria FC	2003–2013
SAINS FC	2016–2023
(Japan) Gainare Tottori	2025–

Negeri Sembilan Chempaka played in Liga 2 from 1998 until 2001, being promoted to Liga 1 in 2002. NS Chempaka has been affiliated with Negeri Sembilan Football Association since its establishment, before the club was dissolved in 2002.

NS Betaria FC, also known as Betaria FC, was a Malaysian football club based in Tampin. Betaria FC has been affiliated with Negeri Sembilan Football Association since its establishment before being dissolved in 2014.

Based in Seremban, Negeri Sembilan, SAINS is a football club for the Syarikat Air Negeri Sembilan (SAINS)(Literally meaning Negeri Sembilan Water Company). They have been collaborating with Negeri Sembilan since its establishment in 2016. In 2024, the club announced that they are withdrawing from the Malaysia M3 League for the 2024–25 season.

Negeri Sembilan maintains an affiliation with Japanese club Gainare Tottori centred on football development, technical cooperation and player exchange. The partnership includes the sharing of coaching expertise, youth development initiatives and exchange programmes involving players and coaching staff, providing opportunities for technical attachments and training in Japan. The relationship has also facilitated player movement between the two clubs. The affiliation forms part of Negeri Sembilan's broader strategy to strengthen its football development structure through international collaboration.

=== Leagues ===
Name	Years
Suparimau League	2024–

NSFC collaborated with Maxim Event to organise a grassroots football tournament, the Suparimau League, for the under-8, 10, 12, 14, and 16 age groups. This tournament involves the participation of teams from around Negeri Sembilan. It is run by Maxim Events, which is recognized by FAM as the official grassroots development league.

== Squad number history ==
As of 2026–27 season

This statistic shows which squad numbers have already been assigned in their history and to which players.

No	Active	Formers
1	Syahmi Adib Haikal (2025–)	Tauffiq Ar Rasyid Johar (2023–2025), Muhaimin Mohamad (2021–2022), Hamka Daud (2019–2020), Saiful Amar Sudar (2018), Ezad Ariff Jamaludin (2017), Afif Aizat Azman (2016), Helmi Eliza (2015), Mohd Yatim Abdullah (2014), Kaharuddin Rahman (2012–2013), Muhammad Hanif Saied (2011), Kaharuddin Rahman (2010), Yazid Yassin (2007–2008), Cajetan Ndubuisi Oparaugo (2004), Azlisham Ibrahim (2003), V. Murugan (1997), S. Rajkumar (1996), Asbullah Mahamad (1994)
2	Raimi Shamsul (2026–)	Kei Oshiro (2026), Che Rashid (2022–2025), Aroon Kumar (2021), Aroon Kumar (2018–2019), Lee Tuck (2017), Aroon Kumar (2016), Azizi Matt Rose (2015), Mohd Fauzi Nan (2013–2014), Mohd Rahman Zabul (2004–2010), Everson Martinelli (2003), Shamsul Akmar Japperi (1996)
3	Ryaan Sanizal (2026–)	Azrin Afiq (2024–2026), Tommy Mawat Bada (2023), Khair Jones (2022), Tasnim Fitri (2021), Matheus Vila (2020), Adam Othman (2019), Alex Moraes (2018), Daniel Ting (2016), Mohd Fauzi Nan (2015), Tengku Qayyum (2010–2014), Khairul Azwan (2009), Lamin Conteh (2008), Jason Williams (2006–2007), Faizal Zainal (1994–1999)
4	Park Yi-young (2026–)	Harith Samsuri (2025–2026), Aroon Kumar (2024–2025), Farid Nezal (2023), Hérold Goulon (2022), Fernando Barbosa (2021), Selvan Anbualagan (2020), Abdul Halim Zainal (2019), Fauzan Fauzi (2017–2018), Taylor Regan (2016), Jean Alexandre (2014–2015), Mohd Amirul Omar (2013), Azmeer Yusof (2013), Firdaus Azizul (2012), Mohd Affandy Adimel (2007–2010), B. Rajinikandh (1994–1999)
5	Kei Oshiro (2026–)	Luis Enrique Nsue (2025–2026), Annas Rahmat (2021–2025), Norhafiz Zamani Misbah (2019–2020), Rizal Fahmi Rosid (2018), Annas Rahmat (2016–2017), Mohd Fazliata Taib (2015), Norhafiz Zamani Misbah (2011–2014), Alif Samsudin (2010), Arif Ismail (2009), Marián Juhás (2007), Khairul Anuar Baharom (1999–2007), Ching Hong Aik (1996–1998), K. Gunalan (1994)
6	Wan Kuzri (2026–)	Zahril Azri (2025–2026), Aliyu Abubakar (2024–2025), Aroon Kumar (2023), K. Sarkunan (2022), Abdul Halim Zainal (2021), Asraf Roslan (2020), Kalaiharasan Letchumanan (2019), Mohd Nasriq Baharom (2017–2018), Kevin Günter (2016), Mohd Radzuan Abdullah (2014–2015), William Modibo (2013), Mohd Zulfaizham Kamis (2012), S. Kunanlan (2007–2011), Mohd Nidzam Jamil (2007), Bakhtiar Othman (2006), Lateef Seriki (2005), Salim Khamis (2000), Shamsul Akmar Japperi (1999), Pedro Paulo Oliveira (1998), Idris Kadir (1997), See Kim Seng (1994)
7	Takumi Sasaki (2024–)	Sean Selvaraj (2022–2023), Bae Beom-geun (2021), Shunsuke Nakatake (2019–2020), Flávio Beck Júnior (2018), Bruno Suzuki (2017), Andrew Nabbout (2016), Ahmad Fauzi Saari (2015), Firdaus Azizul (2014), Idris Abdul Karim (2013), S. Kunanlan (2012), Aidil Zafuan (2006–2011), B. Rajinikandh (2003–2005), Rajan Koran (2000–2002), P. Nantha Gobalan (1996), Wong Kah Loon (1994)
8	Wai Linn Aung (2025–)	Zaquan Adha (2021–2023), Abdul Halim Zainal (2020), Asraf Roslan (2018–2019), Shahrul Igwan (2016–2017), Shahrizal Saad (2015), Abdul Halim Zainal (2014), Muhammad Hafiz Husin (2013), Norismaidham Ismail (2012), Zaquan Adha (2009–2011), Idris Abdul Karim (2005–2008), Adnan Mohd. Zain (1999), Rosli Omar (1996–1998)
9	Jovan Motika (2025–)	Ricardo Pires (2024–2025), Mika (2024), Hérold Goulon (2023), Francis Koné (2021), Shahurain Abu Samah (2020), Almir (2019), Mohd Syahid Zaidon (2018), Faizal Abu Bakar (2017), Mohd Afiq Azmi (2016), Francis Doe (2015), Eddy Helmi Abdul Manan (2014), Shahurain Abu Samah (2007–2013), Suharmin Yusuf (2004), Ching Hong Aik (1999–2000), Dollah Salleh (1998), Zami Mohd Noor (1995–1997)
10	Luqman Hakim (2025–)	Hein Htet Aung (2023–2025), Lévy Madinda (2023), Omid Nazari (2022), Almir (2020), Thomas Koroma (2019), Nicolás Vélez (2018), Marko Šimić (2017), Alex Smith (2016), Bruno Martelotto (2015), Jean-Emmanuel Effa Owona (2014), Abdul Halim Zainal (2013), Jean-Emmanuel Effa Owona (2012), Abdul Halim Zainal (2011), Mohd Shaffik Abdul Rahman (2010), K. Ravindran (2009), Udo Fortune (2008), Liew Kit Kong (2007), Christian Bekamenga (2005–2006), Rajan Koran (2004), Luciano Osmar (2003), Azmi Mohamed (2000), Scott Ollerenshaw (1998), Tristram Morgan (1997), Gustavo Cerro (1996)
11	Aboubakar Kamara (2026–)	Joseph Esso (2025–2026), Dzulfahmi Abdul Hadi (2024), Matheus Alves (2022), Alif Romli (2021), Adam Othman (2020), Dzulfahmi Abdul Hadi (2019), Mohd Aizulridzwan Razali (2018), Rahizi Mohd Rasib (2017), Joel Chianese (2016), Rudie Ramli (2015), Mohd Shoufiq Khusaini (2014), Eddy Helmi Abdul Manan (2013), Mohd Shaffik Abdul Rahman (2011–2012), Syamsol Sabtu (2007–2010), Che Hisamuddin Hassan (2005–2006), Syaiful Sabtu (2000–2004), Ahmad Shahrul Azhar (1999), Gustavo Cerro (1997), Julio Hector Ceballos (1997), Mohd Faris Ahmad (1996), Sazali Nasir (1994)
12	Afiq Fitri (2025–)	Barathkumar Ramaloo (2023–2025), Kaharuddin Rahman (2022), Barathkumar Ramaloo (2021), Kaharuddin Rahman (2016–2020), G. Puaneswaran (2014–2015), Mohd Radzuan Abdullah (2013), Shukor Adan (2009–2012), Abdullah Sani Yusof (2007), K. Sathian (2005–2006), Shahrin Abdul Majid (2004), Lim Chan Yew (2003), Leong Hong Seng (1999–2002), M. Balan (1996–1997)
13	Zainal Abidin Jamil (2025–)	Ikhwan Yazek (2024–2025), Zainal Abidin Jamil (2023), Kaharuddin Rahman (2021), D. Ganesan (2020), Ridzuan Abdunloh (2019), Noor Hazrul Mustafa (2017–2018), Ashmawi Yakin (2016), K. Nanthakumar (2014), Abdul Ghani Rahman (2013), Marian Farbák (2012), Ahmad Fakri Saarani (2011), Mohd Faiz Mohd Isa (2009), Mohd Anuar Jusoh (2003–2007), Khairun Haled Masrom (2000), Zami Mohd Noor (1998–1999), Mohd Nor Sheikh Ismail (1997)
14	Akram Mahinan (2026–)	An Sang-su (2025–2026), Jacque Faye (2024–2025), David Mawutor (2022), Alain Akono (2021), Danial Hadri (2019–2020), Ferris Danial (2018), Ahmad Hazeri Hamid (2017), K. Kavichelvan (2014–2015), Alafi Mahmud (2013), G. Mahathevan (2011–2012), K. Thanaraj (2009–2010), Zaquan Adha (2007–2008), Khaidir Mohd Dom (2005), Mohd Nor Sheikh Ismail (1999), Affendi Julaihi (1998), Aminuddin Hussein (1994)
15		Amirul Adli (2026), Hariz Kamarudin (2022–2025), Danish Haziq (2019), Mohd Fauzan Dzulkifli (2018), Ashmawi Yakin (2017), A. Segar (2016), Kim Jin-yong (2014–2015), Rashid Mahmud (2012–2013), Mohd Hasmawi Hassan (2011), Ching Hong Aik (2004–2010), Fairuz Saleh (2000), Khairil Zainal (1994–1999)
16	Rahman Daud (2026–)	Selvan Anbualagan (2021–2026), Arip Amiruddin (2020), D. Ganesan (2019), Kalaiharasan Letchumanan (2018), Norhafizzuan Jailani (2016–2017), S. Sivanesan (2013–2015), Qhairul Anwar Roslani (2010–2012), Mohd Shaffik Abdul Rahman (2009), Mohd Hafiz Syobri (2007), Rajan Koran (2005), P. Sivanathan (2004), Chow Chee Weng (2000–2001), Shamsul Akmar Japperi (1997), Idris Kadir (1994–1996)
17	Alif Mutalib (2026–)	Hakimi Abdullah (2025–2026), Nasrullah Haniff (2021–2025), Izuan Salahuddin (2017–2020), Rahizi Mohd Rasib (2016), Mohd Akmal Mohd Noor (2015), Alif Samsudin (2013–2014), Abdul Halim Zainal (2012), Idris Abdul Karim (2009–2011), K. Thanaraj (2008), Shahrizam Mohamed (2003–2007), Mohd Rizal Hassan (1999), A. Ganeson (1996–1997)
18	Khuzaimi Piee (2025–)	Afiq Fitri (2024–2025), Mahalli Jasuli (2023), Khuzaimi Piee (2022), Osman Yusoff (2021), Che Mohd Safwan (2020), Osman Yusoff (2019), Khairul Izuan (2018), Shazlan Alias (2017), Aroon Kumar (2017), Khyril Muhymeen (2015), Muszaki Abu Bakar (2014), Fadhil Hashim (2013), Muszaki Abu Bakar (2011–2013), Mohd Norizam Salaman (2010), Arulchelvan Illenggo (2009), Freddy (2007), Noel Rodwell Mwandila (2006), Abdulrazak Ekpoki (2004), Mohd Nor Sheikh Ismail (2000), Jose Iriarte (1996–1997), Marian Valach (1994)
19	N. Javabilaarivin (2021–)	Aiman Khalidi (2019–2020), Khairul Anwar Shahrudin (2016–2018), M. Sivakumar (2014), Firdaus Azizul (2013), Parameswaran Vijayan (2012), Firdaus Azizul (2010–2011), Muhd Afify Khusli (2009), Buston Nagbe Browne (2006), Alfred Effiong (2004), Azman Adnan (2003), Azman Adnan (2000–2001), Azmi Mohamed (1996–1997), J. Killan (1995)
20	Mio Tsuneyasu (2025–)	Norfiqrie Talib (2024–2025), Kossi Adetu (2022), Igor Luiz (2020), Faizal Abu Bakar (2018), Hariri Safii (2016–2017), Dzaiddin Zainuddin (2014–2015), Fábio Barbosa (2013), Emanuel de Porras (2013), Idris Abdul Karim (2012), Hairuddin Omar (2011), Abdul Halim Zainal (2008–2010), Norshahrul Idlan (2007), Efendi Abdul Malek (1999–2005), Gustavo Cerro (1998), Christie Joseph (1996–1997), Robert Bozik (1994)
21	Haiqal Haqeemi (2026–)	Oday Kharoub (2026), Haiqal Haqeemi (2025), Syahmi Adib (2024–2025), Safuwan Baharudin (2023), Raja Imran Shah (2021), Fauzi Latif (2018–2019), Sabri Sahar (2016), Irwan Fadzli Idrus (2015), Kaharuddin Rahman (2014), Mohd Hamsani Ahmad (2013), Ahmad Shakir Mohd Ali (2012), Irwan Fadzli Idrus (2011), Sani Anuar Kamsani (2009–2010), Azizon Abdul Kadir (2004–2007), Hamsani Ahmad (2000–2001), Othman Katmon (1996–1997), Naina Mohammad (1994)
22	Aqil Razak (2024–)	Vinicius Leonel (2023), Syihan Hazmi (2022), Damien Lim (2021), Fadzley Rahim (2019), Syihan Hazmi (2018), Farderin Kadir (2017), Kaharuddin Rahman (2015), Badrulzaman Abdul Halim (2012–2014), Farizal Harun (2008–2011), Suffian Rahman (2003–2005), Yazid Yassin (1996–2001), Khairuddin Idris (1994)
23	Filip Andersen (2025–)	Izaffiq Ruzi (2024–2025), Sikh Izhan (2023), Izaffiq Ruzi (2022), Danial Hadri (2021), Izaaq Izhan (2019–2020), Nizam Ruslan (2016–2018), Rezal Zambery Yahya (2015), Nizam Abu Bakar (2014), Nazrin Nawi (2012–2013), Ahmad Aminuddin Shaharudin (2011), Rezal Zambery Yahya (2005–2010), K. Sathian (2004), Wong Sai Kong (2000–2001), Chow Chee Weng (1999)
24	Yuichi Hirano (2026–)	Alex Agyarkwa (2025), Harith Samsuri (2024–2025), Saiful Ridzuwan (2021–2023), Aiman Khalidi (2018), Shazlan Alias (2016), Sumardi Hajalan (2014), Mohd Zulfaizham Kamis (2013), Alif Samsudin (2011–2012), Mohd Syukri Ismail (2009–2010), Tengku Qayyum (2007), Norhafiz Zamani Misbah (2003–2004)
25		Anwar Ibrahim (2025–2026), Izzuddin Roslan (2024–2025), Adib Faris (2022), Ferris Danial (2021), Azriddin Rosli (2020), Ferris Danial (2019), N. Thanabalan (2018), Saiful Amar Sudar (2017), Ahmad Hazeri Hamid (2015), Jozef Kapláň (2014), Ahmad Shakir Mohd Ali (2013), Farizal Marlias (2011–2012), Tengku Qayyum (2009), K. Thanaraj (2007), P. Sivanathan (2005–2006), Rajan Koran (2003), Shukor Adan (2000–2001)
26	Hairiey Hakim (2026–)	Amirul Hakimi Rosli (2024–2025), Namathevan Arunasalam (2022), Rafinha (2021), David Rowley (2018), Prak Mony Udom (2018), Nemanja Vidić (2017), A. Segar (2015), Zulfaizham Kamis (2014), Rahizi Mohd Rasib (2013), Khairul Ridzwan Othman (2011–2012), Muhd Shahruddin Ismail (2010), Firdaus Azizul (2009), Abdul Halim Zainal (2007)
27		Hadin Azman (2024–2026), Fahmi Faizal (2021–2023), Ilham Amirullah Razali (2018), Izzudin Zainudin (2015–2017), Ivan Babić (2014), Fiqri Azwan Ghazali (2013), Bukhari Idris (2012), Fiqri Azwan Ghazali (2011), L. Rajesh (2010), Hairuddin Omar (2009)
28	Ariff Ar-Rasyid (2025–)	Zainal Abidin Jamil (2024–2025), Azrul Nizam (2019), Renārs Rode (2018), Arman Fareez Ali (2017), Mohd Asyraf Al-Japri (2009–2010), Marián Juhás (2008)
29	Anuar Ceesay (2026–)	Syed Zaris Irfan (2025), Alifh Aiman (2024), Muhaimin Mohamad (2023), Deevan Raj (2021), Fauzi Latif (2020), Kim Do-heon (2018), Curran Ferns (2017), Bukhairi Idris (2013), Abdul Rahman Abdul Ghani (2012), Munir Amran (2011), Alif Samsudin (2009), Qhairul Anwar Roslani (2007)
30	Azri Ghani (2025–)	Sebastian Avanzini (2024–2025), Zamri Pin Ramli (2021–2023), Matheus Vila (2019), Fakrul Aiman (2018), Mohd Yatim Abdullah (2017), Syed Adney (2016), Mohd Yatim Abdullah (2015), Philani Kubheka (2014), Fiqri Azwan Ghazali (2012), Fiqri Azwan Ghazali (2010), P. Kesavan (2009), Farizal Harun (2007)
31		Fareez Safwan (2026), Firdaus Irman (2023), Azeem Farhan (2021), Nazrul Kamaruzaman (2020), A. Segar (2014), V. Parameswaran (2009)
32	Akhyar Rashid (2026–)	Shahrel Fikri (2023), Farouq Adam Khan (2019)
33	Umar Hakeem (2026–)	Zaim Iqbal (2025–2026), Lee Kwang-Hui (2024–2025), Hafiz Ramdan (2023), Hakimi Rosli (2022), N. Thanabalan (2016), N. Thanabalan (2014), Khairul Izuan Abdullah (2012)
34		Sean Selvaraj (2017), Azmeer Yusof (2012)
35		Haiqal Danish (2025–2026), Hasbullah Abu Bakar (2023), K. Thanaraj (2012)
36		Yashir Pinto (2022)
37		
38		Vimal Sugu (2024–2025)
39		Noor Aidil (2025–2026)
40		An Sang-su (2024–2025), Harith Samsuri (2023)
42		Adam Haris (2024–2025)
44		Afiq Fitri (2022–2023), Arthur Cunha (2021)
55		Shahrom Kalam (2020), Osman Yusoff (2018)
58		Ángel Guirado (2018–2019)
60		Igor Luiz (2019)
67		Amirul Hakimi Rosli (2023)
70		Youssef Ezzejjari (2023), Gustavo (2022)
71		Muhaimin Mohamad (2024–2025)
72		Zulkhairi Zulkeply (2021–2022)
77		Shamie Iszuan (2020)
88		Izzuddin Roslan (2022–2023)
97		Filemon Anyie (2023)
99		Casagrande (2023)
