= 2011 Negeri Sembilan FA season =

Negeri Sembilan
2011 season
- President: Mohammad Hassan
- Manager: Abdul Halim Abdul Latif
- Head Coach: Wan Jamak Wan Hassan (Until March 2011); Azraai Khor (From 21 March 2011)
- Stadium: Tuanku Abdul Rahman Stadium
- Malaysia Super League: 8th
- FA Cup: Second round
- Malaysia Cup: Winners
- Top goalscorer: League: Mohd Firdaus Azizul (7); All: Hairuddin Omar (11)
| Home colours | Away colours |

The 2011 season was Negeri Sembilan's 6th season in Malaysia Super League since it was first introduced in 2004, the top flight of Malaysian football.

Negeri Sembilan played in the Malaysian Super League and the Malaysian FA Cup. Negeri Sembilan qualified for the Malaysia Cup, after finishing 6th in the Super League, Negeri qualified to Malaysia FA Cup Final for the second time with their coach Wan Jamak Wan Hassan. They won the trophy after defeating Kedah FA. The first goal was scored by Baddrol Bakhtiar for Kedah FA in the 27th minutes . Mohd Shaffik Abdul Rahman equalised the score in the 39st minute. Negeri won on a penalty shoot out. Negeri ended their Malaysia Cup campaign at the final, defeated by Kelantan FA.

== Club ==
=== Coaching staff ===
| Position | Name |
|---|---|
| President | (Malaysia) Datuk Seri Utama Haji Mohammad Haji Hassan |
| Manager | (Malaysia) Dato' Haji Abd. Halim bin Haji Abd. Latif |
| Assistant Manager | (Malaysia) Faizal Zainal |
| Head team coach | (Malaysia) Mohd Azraai Khor Abdullah |
| Assistant head coach | (Malaysia) Ahmad Osman |
| Goalkeeping coach | (Malaysia) Azhar Dol |
| Fitness coach | (Malaysia) Mashiedee Sulaiman |
| Physiotherapist | (Malaysia) Mashiedee Sulaiman |
| Team Assistant | (Malaysia) Harun Ismail |
| Media Officer | (Malaysia) Hj. Abd. Malek Hj. Hasan |
| Medical Officer | (Malaysia) Dr. Rozaiman Ebrahim |

=== Kit Manufacturers & Financial Sponsor ===
| Nation | Corporation |
Main sponsors
| (Malaysia) | Negeri Roadstone Sdn Bhd |
Shirt sponsors
| (Italy) | |

== Player Information ==
=== Full Squad ===
| No. | Name | Age | Nat. | Position | Join | Signed From | D.O.B | Notes |
Goalkeepers
| 1 | Muhammad Hanif Saied | 18 | (Malaysia) | GK | 2011 | Negeri Sembilan FA U21 | 10 Oct. 1993 | |
| 22 | Mohd Farizal Harun | 25 | (Malaysia) | GK | 2007 | Negeri Sembilan FA U21 | 2 Feb. 1986 | |
| 25 | Mohd Farizal Marlias | 25 | (Malaysia) | GK | 2011 | Perlis FA | 29 June 1986 | |
Defenders
| 3 | Tengku Qayyum Ubaidillah Tengku Ahmad | 25 | (Malaysia) | LB | 2007 | Negeri Sembilan FA U21 | 5 Mar. 1986 | |
| 5 | Norhafiz Zamani Misbah | 30 | (Malaysia) | CB / DM | 2011 | (Kuala Lumpur) PLUS F.C. | 15 July 1981 | |
| 7 | Mohd Aidil Zafuan Abdul Radzak | 24 | (Malaysia) | CB | 2006 | Negeri Sembilan FA U21 | 3 Aug. 1987 | Vice-captain |
| 14 | G. Mahathevan | 23 | (Malaysia) | CB / DM | 2011 | (Selangor) PKNS F.C. | 31 May 1988 | |
| 16 | Qhairul Anwar Roslani | 24 | (Malaysia) | RB / DM | 2007 | Negeri Sembilan FA U21 | 22 Jan. 1987 | |
| 18 | Muszaki Abu Bakar | 22 | (Malaysia) | RB / DM | 2011 | (Malaysia) Harimau Muda B | 15 Mar. 1989 | |
| 21 | Irwan Fadzli Idrus | 30 | (Malaysia) | CB / LB | 2011 | (Kuala Lumpur) PLUS F.C. | 2 June 1981 | |
| 24 | Mohd Alif Shamsudin | 25 | (Malaysia) | RB / DM | 2009 | Negeri Sembilan FA U21 | 1 Feb. 1986 | |
| 27 | Fiqri Azwan Ghazali | 19 | (Malaysia) | LB | 2010 | Negeri Sembilan FA U21 | 30 Mar. 1992 | |
Midfielders
| 6 | S. Kunanlan | 25 | (Malaysia) | RW / LW / RB | 2006 | Negeri Sembilan FA U21 | 15 Sep. 1986 | |
| 9 | Shahurain Abu Samah | 25 | (Malaysia) | RW / LW / ST | 2006 | Negeri Sembilan FA U21 | 23 Dis. 1986 | |
| 10 | Abdul Halim Zainal | 23 | (Malaysia) | DM / CM / AM | 2008 | Negeri Sembilan FA U21 | 29 July 1988 | |
| 11 | Mohd Shaffik Abdul Rahman | 27 | (Malaysia) | RW / LW | 2008 | (Kuala Lumpur) UPB-MyTeam F.C. | 14 July 1984 | |
| 12 | Shukor Adan | 32 | (Malaysia) | DM / CM / AM / CB | 2009 | Selangor FA | 24 Sep. 1979 | Captain |
| 13 | Ahmad Fakri Saarani | 22 | (Malaysia) | RW / ST | 2011 | Perlis FA | 8 July 1989 | |
| 17 | Idris Abdul Karim | 35 | (Malaysia) | DM / CM / AM | 2005 | Johor FC | 29 Nov. 1976 | |
| 23 | Ahmad Aminuddin Shaharudin | 21 | (Malaysia) | RW / LW / ST | 2011 | Perlis FA | 21 Mar. 1990 | |
| 29 | Munir Amran | 28 | (Malaysia) | RW / LW | 2011 | Pahang FA | 7 Nov. 1983 | Loan In |
Forwards
| 8 | Mohd Zaquan Adha Abdul Radzak | 24 | (Malaysia) | ST | 2006 | Negeri Sembilan FA U21 | 3 Aug. 1987 | |
| 15 | Mohd Hasmawi Hassan | 31 | (Malaysia) | ST | 2011 | (Kuala Lumpur) Felda United F.C. | 4 Aug. 1980 | |
| 19 | Mohd Firdaus Azizul | 23 | (Malaysia) | ST / RW / LW | 2008 | Negeri Sembilan FA U21 | 3 Jan. 1988 | |
| 20 | Hairuddin Omar | 32 | (Malaysia) | ST | 2011 | Kelantan FA | 29 Sep. 1979 | |
| 26 | Khairul Ridzwan Othman | 20 | (Malaysia) | ST | 2010 | Negeri Sembilan FA U21 | 7 Oct. 1991 | |

== Transfers ==
In

| No. | Pos. | Name | Age | From | Notes |
|---|---|---|---|---|---|
| 1 | GK | (Malaysia) Muhammad Hanif Saied | 18 | Negeri Sembilan FA U21 | Promoted |
| 5 | DF | (Malaysia) Norhafiz Zamani Misbah | 30 | (Kuala Lumpur) PLUS F.C. | |
| 13 | MF | (Malaysia) Ahmad Fakri Saarani | 22 | Perlis FA | |
| 14 | DF | (Malaysia) G. Mahathevan | 23 | (Selangor) PKNS F.C. | |
| 15 | FW | (Malaysia) Hasmawi Hassan | 31 | (Kuala Lumpur) Felda United F.C. | |
| 18 | DF | (Malaysia) Muszaki Abu Bakar | 22 | (Malaysia) Harimau Muda B | |
| 20 | FW | (Malaysia) Hairuddin Omar | 32 | Kelantan FA | |
| 21 | DF | (Malaysia) Irwan Fadzli Idrus | 30 | (Kuala Lumpur) PLUS F.C. | |
| 23 | MF | (Malaysia) Ahmad Aminuddin Shaharudin | 21 | Perlis FA | |
| 25 | GK | (Malaysia) Mohd Farizal Marlias | 25 | Perlis FA | |
| 26 | FW | (Malaysia) Khairul Ridzwan Othman | 20 | Negeri Sembilan FA U21 | Promoted |

Out

| No. | Pos. | Name | Age | From | Notes |
|---|---|---|---|---|---|
| 1 | GK | (Malaysia) Kaharuddin Rahman | 20 | Negeri Sembilan FA U21 | Demoted |
| 2 | DF | (Malaysia) Mohd Rahman Zabul | 29 | Johor FC | |
| 4 | DF | (Malaysia) Mohd Affandy Adimel | 25 | Johor FA | |
| 11 | DF | (Malaysia) Syamsol Sabtu | 26 | Retired | |
| 14 | MF | (Malaysia) K. Thanaraj | 25 | Sabah FA | |
| 15 | DF | (Malaysia) Ching Hong Aik | 38 | (Johor) MP Muar F.C. | |
| 18 | FW | (Malaysia) Mohd Norizam Salaman | 27 | Johor FA | |
| 21 | GK | (Malaysia) Sani Anuar Kamsani | 28 | (Johor) MP Muar F.C. | |
| 23 | MF | (Malaysia) Rezal Zambery Yahya | 33 | Johor FC | |
| 24 | DF | (Malaysia) Mohd Syukri Ismail | 25 | Johor FA | |
| 26 | GK | (Malaysia) Muhd Shahruddin Ismail | 27 | (Kuala Lumpur) Pos Malaysia F.C. | Loan End |
| 27 | FW | (Malaysia) L. Rajesh | 31 | Johor FA | Loan End |
| 28 | MF | (Malaysia) Mohd Asyraf Al-Japri | 21 | Johor FA | |

Loan For Malaysia Cup

| No. | Pos. | Name | Age | From | Notes |
|---|---|---|---|---|---|
| 29 | MF | (Malaysia) Munir Amran | 28 | Pahang FA | Loan In |

== Non-competitive ==
=== Pre-season ===
Win Draw Loss

| 25 November 2010 1 | Negeri Sembilan FA | 1 - 3 | (Johor) MP Muar F.C. | Paroi |
| 16:30 | Ahmad Aminuddin Shaharudin | | Goal | Stadium: Tuanku Abdul Rahman Stadium |

| 1 December 2010 2 | Negeri Sembilan FA | 1 - 2 | (Kuala Lumpur) Pos Malaysia F.C. | Paroi |
| 17:00 | Goal | | Goal | Stadium: Tuanku Abdul Rahman Stadium |

| 17 December 2010 3 | Negeri Sembilan FA | 5 - 0 | (Malaysia) Maybank F.C. | Paroi |
| 17:00 | Goal | | | Stadium: Tuanku Abdul Rahman Stadium |

| 18 December 2010 4 | Negeri Sembilan FA | 5 - 0 | (Kuala Lumpur) MBSA F.C. | Paroi |
| 17:00 | Ahmad Fakri Saarani; Hairuddin Omar; Ahmad Aminuddin Shaharudin | | | Stadium: Tuanku Abdul Rahman Stadium |

| 31 December 2010 5 | Negeri Sembilan FA | 1 - 0 | Kuala Lumpur FA | Paroi |
| 16:30 | Goal | | | Stadium: Tuanku Abdul Rahman Stadium |

| 4 January 2011 6 | Negeri Sembilan FA | 2 - 0 | Johor F.C. | Paroi |
| 20:00 | Abdul Halim Zainal; Hairuddin Omar | | | Stadium: Tuanku Abdul Rahman Stadium |

=== Friendly Match ===
Win Draw Loss

| 21 June 2011 1 | Negeri Sembilan FA | 2 - 0 | (Malaysia) Maybank F.C. | Paroi |
| 20:45 | | | | Stadium: Tuanku Abdul Rahman Stadium |

| 28 June 2011 2 | Negeri Sembilan FA | 2 - 0 | (Selangor) UiTM F.C. | Paroi |
| 20:45 | | | | Stadium: Tuanku Abdul Rahman Stadium |

| 17 August 2011 3 | Johor F.C. | 1 - 1 | Negeri Sembilan FA | Pasir Gudang |
| 22:00 | | | | Stadium: Pasir Gudang Corporation Stadium |

| 20 August 2011 4 | Negeri Sembilan FA | v | Sarawak FA | Paroi |
| 22:00 | | | | Stadium: Tuanku Abdul Rahman Stadium |

| 24 August 2011 5 | Negeri Sembilan FA | v | Johor F.C. | Paroi |
| 22:00 | | | | Stadium: Tuanku Abdul Rahman Stadium |

| 27 August 2011 6 | Negeri Sembilan FA | v | Selangor FA | Paroi |
| 22:00 | | | | Stadium: Tuanku Abdul Rahman Stadium |

| 7 October 2011 7 | Negeri Sembilan FA | v | Putrajaya SPA F.C. | Paroi |
| 20:45 | | | | Stadium: Tuanku Abdul Rahman Stadium |

== Competitions ==
=== Malaysia Super League ===
==== League table ====
| Pos | Team | Pld | W | D | L | GF | GA | GD | Pts |
|---|---|---|---|---|---|---|---|---|---|
| 6 | Perak | 26 | 10 | 10 | 6 | 31 | 24 | +7 | 40 |
| 7 | Johor FC | 26 | 8 | 10 | 8 | 26 | 28 | −2 | 34 |
| 8 | Negeri Sembilan | 26 | 8 | 8 | 10 | 29 | 32 | −3 | 32 |
| 9 | T–Team | 26 | 9 | 4 | 13 | 35 | 40 | −5 | 31 |
| 10 | Sabah | 26 | 7 | 7 | 12 | 24 | 32 | −8 | 28 |

Updated to match(es) played on unknown. Source: FIFA
Rules for classification: 1) Points; 2) Goal difference; 3) Number of goals scored.

==== Matches ====
Win Draw Loss

| 29 January 2011 1 | Negeri Sembilan FA | 1 – 0 | (Malaysia) Harimau Muda A | Paroi |
| 20:45 | Mohd Shaffik Abdul Rahman 87' | | | Stadium: Tuanku Abdul Rahman Stadium; Referee: Wan Mohamad Tarmizi Wan Ibrahim |

| 1 February 2011 2 | T–Team F.C. (Terengganu) | 1 – 3 | Negeri Sembilan FA | Kuala Terengganu |
| 20:45 | Rosdi Talib 41' | | 22', 67' Idris Abdul Karim; 53' Mohd Firdaus Azizul | Stadium: Sultan Ismail Nasiruddin Shah Stadium; Referee: Shahimi Abdullah |

| 12 February 2011 3 | Perak FA | 2 – 0 | Negeri Sembilan FA | Ipoh |
| 20:45 | Shahrulnizam Mustapa 51' (pen.); Akmal Rizal Ahmad Rakhli 65' | | | Stadium: Perak Stadium; Referee: Anuar Che Husin |

| 15 February 2011 4 | Negeri Sembilan FA | 0 – 1 | (Kuala Lumpur) Felda United F.C. | Paroi |
| 20:45 | | | 88' Abdul Ghani Rahman | Stadium: Tuanku Abdul Rahman Stadium; Referee: Mohd Nazer Mohd Said |

| 26 February 2011 5 | Negeri Sembilan FA | 1 – 0 | Sabah FA | Paroi |
| 20:45 | Mohd Firdaus Azizul 76' | | | Stadium: Tuanku Abdul Rahman Stadium; Referee: Shokri Nor |

| 8 March 2012 6 | Kelantan FA | 3 – 0 | Negeri Sembilan FA | Kota Bharu |
| 20:45 | S. Chanturu 48'; Norshahrul Idlan Talaha 74', 79' | | | Stadium: Sultan Mohammad IV Stadium; Referee: Ramli Mat Dahan |

| 12 March 2011 7 | Negeri Sembilan FA | 1 – 2 | Selangor FA | Paroi |
| 20:45 | Shahurain Abu Samah 11' | | 60' Mohd Amri Yahyah; 78' Mohd Safiq Rahim | Stadium: Tuanku Abdul Rahman Stadium; Referee: Mohd Nafeez Abdul Wahab |

| 2 April 2011 8 | Negeri Sembilan FA | 1 – 1 | Terengganu FA | Paroi |
| 20:45 | Ahmad Fakri Saarani 3' | | 58' Abdul Manaf Mamat | Stadium: Tuanku Abdul Rahman Stadium; Referee: Rosdi Shaharul |

| 5 April 2011 9 | Negeri Sembilan FA | 0 – 1 | Kuala Lumpur FA | Paroi |
| 20:45 | | | 5' Badrul Hisyam Azmi | Stadium: Tuanku Abdul Rahman Stadium; Referee: Zamzaidi Katimin |

| 9 April 2011 10 | Johor FC | 0 – 0 | Negeri Sembilan FA | Pasir Gudang |
| 20:45 | | | | Stadium: Pasir Gudang Corporation Stadium; Referee: Syez Azhar Syed Kamar |

| 12 April 2011 11 | Negeri Sembilan FA | 0 – 2 | Kedah FA | Paroi |
| 20:45 | | | 61' Azlan Ismail; 88' Baddrol Bakhtiar | Stadium: Tuanku Abdul Rahman Stadium; Referee: Mohamad Rahmat Jantan |

| 16 April 2011 12 | Perlis FA | 3 – 2 | Negeri Sembilan FA | Kangar |
| 20:45 | Mohd Hysiam Mohd Shofi 45+1'; Rizal Ghazali 68', 75' | | 28' Mohd Firdaus Azizul; 90+3' G. Mahathevan | Stadium: Utama Negeri Stadium; Referee: Sew Tian Hu |

| 19 April 2011 13 | Pahang FA | 1 – 1 | Negeri Sembilan FA | Kuantan |
| 20:45 | Famirul Asyraf Sayuti 78' | | 10' Idris Abdul Karim | Stadium: Darulmakmur Stadium; Referee: Mohd Sabri Mohd Lazim |

| 23 April 2011 14 | Negeri Sembilan FA | 3 – 1 | Pahang FA | Paroi |
| 20:45 | Shahurain Abu Samah 13'; G. Mahathevan 27'; Mohd Firdaus Azizul 58' | | 77' R. Karthigesu | Stadium: Tuanku Abdul Rahman Stadium; Referee: Sukri Abdul Rahman |

| 26 April 2011 15 | Harimau Muda A (Malaysia) | 1 – 1 | Negeri Sembilan FA | Petaling Jaya |
| 20:45 | V. Kavi Chelvan 10' | | 15' (O.G) Fadhli Shas | Stadium: Petaling Jaya Stadium; Referee: Sani Tari |

| 30 April 2011 16 | Felda United F.C. (Kuala Lumpur) | 2 – 2 | Negeri Sembilan FA | Cheras |
| 20:45 | Mohd Nizaruddin Yusof 57'; Lot Abu Hassan 85' | | 43' Shukor Adan; 48' Mohd Firdaus Azizul | Stadium: KLFA Stadium; Referee: Suhaizi Shukri |

| 3 May 2011 17 | Negeri Sembilan FA | 3 – 1 | Perak FA | Paroi |
| 20:45 | Khairul Ridzwan Othman 33'; Hairuddin Omar 56', 72' | | 90+2' Razali Umar Kandasamy | Stadium: Tuanku Abdul Rahman Stadium; Referee: Ramli Mat Dahan |

| 6 May 2011 18 | Sabah FA | 2 - 0 | Negeri Sembilan FA | Kota Kinabalu |
| 20:15 | Zainizam Marjan 69'; Mohd Farid Ideris 85' | | | Stadium: Likas Stadium; Referee: Mohd Zohri Tajuddin |

| 10 May 2011 19 | Negeri Sembilan FA | 0 - 0 | Kelantan FA | Paroi |
| 20:45 | | | | Stadium: Tuanku Abdul Rahman Stadium; Referee: Shokri Nor |

| 19 May 2011 20 | Negeri Sembilan FA | 2 - 1 | Johor FC | Paroi |
| 20:45 | Shahurain Abu Samah 8'; Shukor Adan 38' | | 51' Mohd Riduwan Ma'on | Stadium: Tuanku Abdul Rahman Stadium; Referee: Mohamad Rahmat Jantan |

| 22 May 2011 21 | Terengganu FA | 3 - 0 | Negeri Sembilan FA | Kuala Terengganu |
| 20:45 | Abdul Manaf Mamat 25', 53'; Mohd Ashaari Shamsuddin 64' | | | Stadium: Sultan Ismail Nasiruddin Shah Stadium; Referee: Muhammad Nazmi Nasaruddin |

| 25 May 2011 22 | Kuala Lumpur FA | 1 – 1 | Negeri Sembilan FA | Cheras |
| 20:45 | Ahmad Hazwan Bakri 24' | | 71' Mohd Aidil Zafuan Abdul Radzak | Stadium: KLFA Stadium; Referee: Ku Alaudin Ku Mohamad |

| 28 May 2011 23 | Selangor FA | 2 - 0 | Negeri Sembilan FA | Shah Alam |
| 20:45 | Mohd Fadzli Saari 50'; Rudie Ramli 90' | | | Stadium: Shah Alam Stadium; Referee: Rosdi Shaharul |

| 6 June 2011 24 | Negeri Sembilan FA | 4 - 0 | (Terengganu) T–Team F.C. | Paroi |
| 20:45 | S. Kunanlan 1'; Mohd Firdaus Azizul 22', 43'; Hairuddin Omar 46' | | | Stadium: Tuanku Abdul Rahman Stadium; Referee: Syez Azhar Syed Kamar |

| 14 June 2011 25 | Kedah FA | 1 - 1 | Negeri Sembilan FA | Alor Setar |
| 20:45 | Baddrol Bakhtiar 73' | | 81' (O.G) Shahril Faizal Sharifuddin | Stadium: Darul Aman Stadium; Referee: Ku Alaudin Ku Mohamad |

| 6 July 2011 26 | Negeri Sembilan FA | 2 - 0 | Perlis FA | Paroi |
| 20:45 | Ahmad Fakri Saarani 39'; Shahurain Abu Samah 60' | | | Stadium: Tuanku Abdul Rahman Stadium; Referee: Wan Mohamad Tarmizi Wan Ibrahim |

=== Malaysia FA Cup ===
==== Knockout stage ====
Win Draw Loss

| 4 March 2011 Second round | Negeri Sembilan FA | 0 – 0 (a.e.t.) (2 - 4 p) | Kuala Lumpur FA | Paroi |
| 20:45 | | | | Stadium: Tuanku Abdul Rahman Stadium |

=== Malaysia Cup ===
==== Group stage ====
| Team | Pld | W | D | L | GF | GA | GD | Pts |
|---|---|---|---|---|---|---|---|---|
| Negeri Sembilan FA | 6 | 4 | 1 | 1 | 10 | 4 | +6 | 13 |
| Terengganu FA | 6 | 4 | 1 | 1 | 8 | 3 | +5 | 13 |
| (Selangor) PKNS FC | 6 | 3 | 0 | 3 | 7 | 6 | +1 | 9 |
| (Kuala Lumpur) Sime Darby FC | 6 | 0 | 0 | 6 | 1 | 13 | −12 | 0 |

Win Draw Loss

| 6 September 2011 1 | PKNS F.C. (Selangor) | 1 - 2 | Negeri Sembilan FA | Petaling Jaya |
| 20:45 | Mohd Norhafizzuan Jailani 8' | | 15' Hairuddin Omar; 44' Shahurain Abu Samah | Stadium: Petaling Jaya Stadium; Attendance: 600 |

| 10 September 2011 2 | Negeri Sembilan FA | 5 - 0 | (Kuala Lumpur) Sime Darby F.C. | Paroi |
| 20:45 | Hairuddin Omar 33', 72'; Shahurain Abu Samah 36'; Shukor Adan 64'; Mohd Firdaus Azizul 79' | | | Stadium: Tuanku Abdul Rahman Stadium |

| 13 September 2011 3 | Negeri Sembilan FA | 1 - 0 | Terengganu FA | Paroi |
| 20:45 | Shahurain Abu Samah 65' | | | Stadium: Tuanku Abdul Rahman Stadium |

| 17 September 2011 4 | Negeri Sembilan FA | 0 - 2 | (Selangor) PKNS F.C. | Paroi |
| 20:45 | | | 48' Mohd Fauzan Dzulkifli; 58' Mohamad Norhisham Hassan | Stadium: Tuanku Abdul Rahman Stadium |

| 24 September 2011 5 | Sime Darby F.C. (Kuala Lumpur) | 1 - 2 | Negeri Sembilan FA | Selayang |
| 20:45 | Mohd Raimi Mohd Nor 14' | | 13' Mohd Firdaus Azizul; 83' Shahurain Abu Samah | Stadium: MP Selayang Stadium |

| 27 September 2011 6 | Terengganu FA | 0 - 0 | Negeri Sembilan FA | Kuala Terengganu |
| 20:45 | | | | Stadium: Sultan Ismail Nasiruddin Shah Stadium |

==== Quarter-finals ====
Win Draw Loss

| 10 October 2011 First leg | Felda United F.C. (Kuala Lumpur) | 1 - 0 | Negeri Sembilan FA | Petaling Jaya |
| 20:45 | K. Rajan 58' | | | Stadium: Petaling Jaya Stadium |

| 14 October 2011 Second leg | Negeri Sembilan FA | 3 - 0 | (Kuala Lumpur) Felda United F.C. | Paroi |
| 20:45 | Hairuddin Omar 17', 110'; Idris Abdul Karim 100' | (A.E.T.) | | Stadium: Tuanku Abdul Rahman Stadium |

Negeri Sembilan FA won 3–1 on aggregate after extra time and advanced to the Semi-finals.

==== Semi-finals ====
Win Draw Loss

| 18 October 2011 First leg | T–Team F.C. (Terengganu) | 2 - 4 | Negeri Sembilan FA | Kuala Terengganu |
| 20:45 | Indra Putra Mahayuddin 10'; Mohd Nor Farhan Muhammad 40' | | 6' Shahurain Abu Samah; 26', 43' Hairuddin Omar; 50' S. Kunanlan | Stadium: Sultan Ismail Nasiruddin Shah Stadium; Referee: Suhaizi Shukri |

| 22 October 2011 Second leg | Negeri Sembilan FA | 2 - 1 | (Terengganu) T–Team F.C. | Paroi |
| 20:45 | Shahurain Abu Samah 73'; Shukor Adan 84' | | 72' Mohd Fitri Omar | Stadium: Tuanku Abdul Rahman Stadium; Referee: Nagor Amir Noor Mohamed |

Negeri Sembilan FA won 6–3 on aggregate and advanced to the Final.

==== Final ====
Win Draw Loss

| 29 October 2011 Final | Terengganu FA | 1 - 2 | Negeri Sembilan FA | Shah Alam |
| 20:45 | Mohd Ashaari Shamsuddin 59' | | 81' S. Kunanlan; 86' Hairuddin Omar | Stadium: Shah Alam Stadium; Attendance: 60,000; Referee: Mohd Shokri Nor |

== Season statistics ==
=== Top scorers ===
| Rnk | Pos | No. | Player | Super League | FA Cup | Malaysia Cup | Total |
|---|---|---|---|---|---|---|---|
| 1 | FW | 20 | (Malaysia) Hairuddin Omar | 3 | 0 | 8 | 11 |
| 2 | MF | 9 | (Malaysia) Shahurain Abu Samah | 4 | 0 | 6 | 10 |
| 3 | FW | 19 | (Malaysia) Mohd Firdaus Azizul | 7 | 0 | 2 | 9 |
| 4 | MF | 17 | (Malaysia) Idris Abdul Karim | 3 | 0 | 1 | 4 |
| 4 | MF | 12 | (Malaysia) Shukor Adan | 2 | 0 | 2 | 4 |
| 5 | MF | 6 | (Malaysia) S. Kunanlan | 1 | 0 | 2 | 3 |
| 6 | DF | 14 | (Malaysia) G. Mahathevan | 2 | 0 | 0 | 2 |
| 6 | MF | 13 | (Malaysia) Ahmad Fakri Saarani | 2 | 0 | 0 | 2 |
| 7 | MF | 11 | (Malaysia) Mohd Shaffik Abdul Rahman | 1 | 0 | 0 | 1 |
| 7 | FW | 26 | (Malaysia) Khairul Ridzwan Othman | 1 | 0 | 0 | 1 |
| 7 | DF | 7 | (Malaysia) Mohd Aidil Zafuan Abdul Radzak | 1 | 0 | 0 | 1 |
| Own goals | | | | 2 | 0 | 0 | 2 |
| TOTALS | | | | 29 | 0 | 21 | 50 |
