= Matrix Concepts Holdings =

Malaysian investment company

Matrix Concepts Holdings Berhad
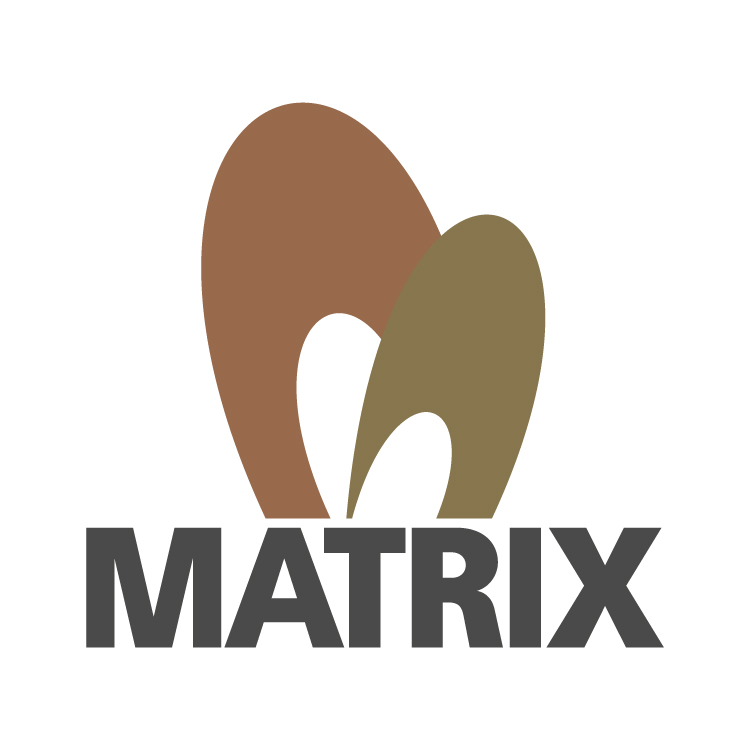
- Type: Public limited company
- Traded as: MYX: 5236
- ISIN: MYL5236OO004
- Industry: Property development, construction, education and hospitality
- Founded: 1996
- Founder: Dato' Lee Tian Hock
- Headquarters: Wisma Matrix, No.57, Jalan Tun Dr. Ismail, 70200 Seremban, Negeri Sembilan, Malaysia
- Key people: Dato' Haji Mohamad Haslah Mohamad Amin, Chairman; Dato' Lee Tian Hock, Group Managing Director
- Website: www.mchb.com.my

Matrix Concepts Holdings Berhad (Chinese: 金群利集团; MYX: 5236）is a Malaysia-based investment holding company.

Established in 1996, Matrix Group's principal business activities are mainly in property development, construction, education and hospitality such as Clubhouse and Hotel. The group is engaged in the development of residential properties, commercial and industrial properties.

Matrix was developing two township developments, Bandar Sri Sendayan in Seremban, Negeri Sembilan and Bandar Seri Impian in Kluang, Johor. Up to date, the group has completed and sold in excess of 28,000 units of residential and commercial properties with accumulated gross development value (GDV) exceeding RM 7.5 Billion.

Matrix Group was floated in the Bursa Malaysia (Malaysian Stock Exchange) as a Main Board Public Listed Company with their initial public offering (IPO) in May 2013. Matrix Concepts Holdings Berhad is listed on Bursa Malaysia, with Stock code 5236
