= 1991 Liga Semi-Pro Divisyen 2 =

- Season: 1991
- Champions: Negeri Sembilan; 1st Second Division title
- Promoted: Negeri Sembilan; Sarawak
- Matches: 112

The 1991 Liga Semi-Pro Divisyen 2 season is the third season of Liga Semi-Pro Divisyen 2. A total of eight teams participated in the season.

Perlis and Sarawak were relegated from 1990 Liga Semi-Pro Divisyen 1.

Under the new format, only the top six teams in Divisyen 1 and the Divisyen 2 champions and runners-up will be involved in the Malaysia Cup. Malaysia Cup was played from the quarter-final stage, scheduled for November after the league was finished. The Malaysia Cup quarter-final and semi-final matches will be played on a home and away basis.

The season kicked off on 27 April 1991. Negeri Sembilan ended up the season by winning the title.

== Teams ==
Eight teams competing in the third season of Liga Semi-Pro Divisyen 2.

- Negeri Sembilan (1991 Liga Semi-Pro Divisyen 2 champions)
- Sarawak (Promoted to Liga Semi-Pro Divisyen 1)
- (Penang) Pulau Pinang (1992 MSPFL promotion play-off)
- (Malaysia) PDRM
- Perlis
- (Malacca) Melaka
- Brunei
- (Malaysia) ATM

== Champions ==
1991 Liga Semi-Pro Divisyen 2 champion

1st title
