= Kwan Soon Teck =

Malaysian footballer

Kwan Soon Teck (born 1920s in Negeri Sembilan) is a former footballer who played for Negeri Sembilan FA and Malaya.

== Career overview ==
A striker, Soon Teck was a squad player for Negeri Sembilan which won the 1948 Malaya Cup.
