= Syarikat Air Negeri Sembilan =

Syarikat Air Negeri Sembilan Sdn Bhd (SAINS)
- Formerly: Jabatan Bekalan Air Negeri Sembilan; Syarikat Air Negeri Sembilan Berhad
- Company type: State-owned enterprise
- Industry: Water supply management for Negeri Sembilan
- Founded: 19 September 2008
- Headquarters: Tingkat 2, Kompleks PKNNS, Jalan Persiaran S2 B2, 70300 Seremban, Negeri Sembilan, Malaysia
- Key people: Mohamad Hasan, Chairman; Wan Rasdi Wan Ismail, Managing Director
- Parent: Menteri Besar Negeri Sembilan Incorporation
- Website: www.sainswater.com

Syarikat Air Negeri Sembilan Sdn Bhd, (literally meaning Negeri Sembilan Water Company Private Limited, abbreviated as SAINS), formerly known as Negeri Sembilan Water Supply Department (Malay: Jabatan Bekalan Air Negeri Sembilan , abbreviated as JBANS) and Syarikat Air Negeri Sembilan Berhad (Negeri Sembilan Water Company Limited) is a government-linked company responsible for water supply services in the state of Negeri Sembilan.
