= Gustavo Cerro =

Australian soccer player (born 1969)

Personal information
- Date of birth: 17 July 1969 (age 57)
- Place of birth: Rosario, Argentina
- Position: Midfielder

Senior career*
Years	Team	Apps	(Gls)
1986	Canberra City	1	(0)
1987-1988	Sydney United	7	(0)
1989-1992	Parramatta Eagles	39	(3)
1992	Marconi Stallions	17	(1)
1992	Bonnyrigg White Eagles		
1993-1995	West Adelaide Sharks	42	(4)
1995	Pahang FC		
1995-1996	Canberra Cosmos	6	(0)
1996-1998	Negeri Sembilan		
1998	Melbourne Knights	3	(0)
1998-2000	Negeri Sembilan		
2001	Bankstown City Lions		
- * Club domestic league appearances and goals

Gustavo Cerro (born 17 July 1969) is an Argentinian-born former Australian soccer player. Son of a former Newell's Old Boys player Jose Carlos Cerro, the former creative midfielder played over 200 matches in the old Australian National Soccer League. He also played in Malaysia for Pahang and Negeri Sembilan.

Gus is father of Australian pop singer songwriter Montaigne.
