= Christian Bekamenga =

Cameroonian international footballer

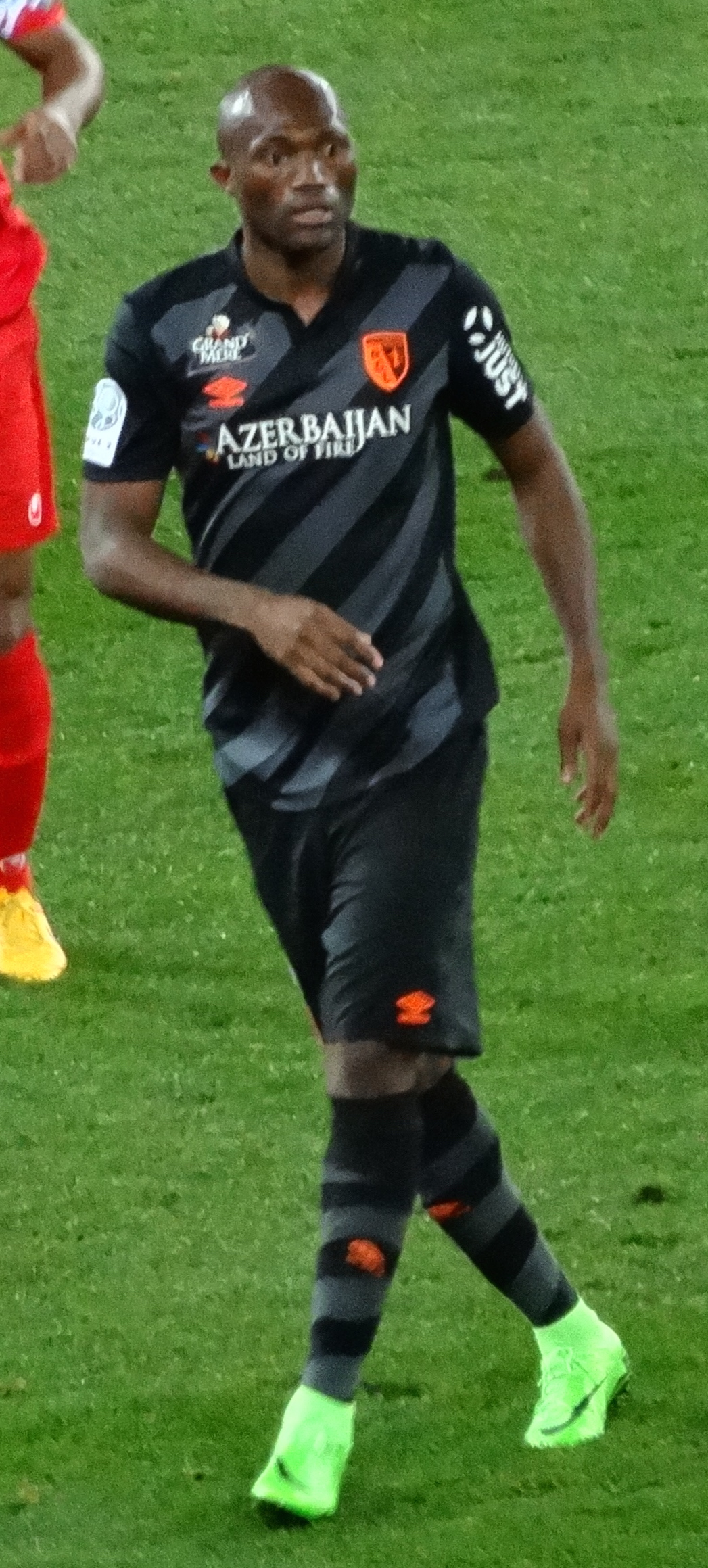
- Bekamenga in 2015

Personal information
- Full name: Christian Bekamenga Bekamengo Aymard
- Date of birth: 9 May 1986 (age 40)
- Place of birth: Yaoundé, Cameroon
- Height: 1.88 m (6 ft 2 in)
- Position: Forward

Youth career
- –2004: PKNS

Senior career*
Years	Team	Apps	(Gls)
2004–2006	Negeri Sembilan	72	(46)
2007–2008	Persib Bandung	20	(17)
2008–2012	Nantes	45	(8)
2010–2011	→ Skoda Xanthi (loan)	4	(0)
2012	Orléans	12	(2)
2012–2013	Carquefou	33	(17)
2013–2015	Laval	50	(22)
2014	Laval B	28	(1)
2015	→ Troyes (loan)	9	(2)
2015–2016	Troyes	1	(0)
2015–2016	→ Lens (loan)	12	(1)
2016	→ Metz (loan)	17	(8)
2016–2017	Balıkesirspor	28	(14)
2017	Liaoning Whowin	8	(2)
2018	Erzurumspor	12	(2)
2019	Elazığspor	7	(1)
2020	Gençlik Gücü	1	(0)
2020–2021	Muktijoddha Sangsad	7	(1)
2021–2022	Real Potosi	22	(3)
2022	Albères Argelès	3	(0)
2022	Sant Julià	3	(0)

International career
2007–2008	Cameroon Olympic	4	(2)
2016	Cameroon	1	(0)
- * Club domestic league appearances and goals as of 1 July 2023

Christian Bekamenga (born 9 May 1986) is a Cameroonian professional footballer who plays as a forward. In 2016, he made one appearance for the Cameroon national team.

== Career ==
Bekamenga previously played for Negeri Sembilan FA of Malaysia. and Persib Bandung of Indonesia. He scored 17 goals in 19 appearances.

Because of his success at Persib Bandung, he was transferred to French club FC Nantes in January 2008. He helped the Olympic Lions to qualify for the 2008 Summer Olympics billed for Beijing, China.

During the summer 2015 transfer window Bekamenga moved to Troyes AC, however within a month the striker was reported to have moved again, to Turkish side Kardemir Karabükspor.

On the last day of the January transfer market, Bekamenga was one of 22 players on two hours, that signed for Turkish club Elazığspor. had been placed under a transfer embargo but managed to negotiate it with the Turkish FA, leading to them going on a mad spree of signing and registering a load of players despite not even having a permanent manager in place. In just two hours, they managed to snap up a record 22 players - 12 coming in on permanent contracts and a further 10 joining on loan deals until the end of the season.

On 24 January 2020, Bekamenga was registered for Turkish-Cypriot club Gençlik Gücü in Nicosia, Cyprus. However, he only played one game for the club on 25 January 2020, before his registration was cancelled again.

== Honours ==
Cameroon U23

- African Games: 2007
