= M. Kuppan =

Malaysian football manager (14 October 1936-31 December 2021)

Datuk M. Kuppan (14 October 1936 - 31 December 2021) was a Malaysian football manager.

== Career ==
Kuppan managed the Malaysia national team.

== Legacy ==
In July 2022, Penang renamed an existing road, Jalan Jiran, to Jalan M Kuppan in honour of his contributions to Penang football. The road is situated besides St Mark’s school field where Kuppan used to train and coach.
