= Marián Juhás =

Slovak footballer

Personal information
- Full name: Marián Juhás
- Date of birth: 28 October 1979 (age 47)
- Place of birth: Košice, Czechoslovakia
- Height: 1.86 m (6 ft 1 in)
- Position: Defender

Team information
- Current team: Pattaya United
- Number: 27

Youth career
- Košice
- →Banská Bystrica (loan)

Senior career*
Years	Team	Apps	(Gls)
2001–2004	Košice	45	(2)
2001	→Michalovce (loan)		
2004	Michalovce		
2005	Perak FA		
2006	Michalovce		
2007–2008	Negeri Sembilan FA		
2010	TOT S.C.		
2011–2012	Pattaya United		
- * Club domestic league appearances and goals as of 3 May 2012

Marián Juhás (born 28 October 1979 in Košice) is a retired Slovak football defender who last played for club Pattaya United.
