= Khairul Ridzwan Othman =

Malaysian footballer (born 1991)

Khairul Ridzwan
Personal information
- Full name: Mohd Khairul Ridzwan bin Othman
- Date of birth: 7 October 1991 (age 35)
- Place of birth: Seremban, Negeri Sembilan, Malaysia
- Height: 1.78 m (5 ft 10 in)
- Position: Striker

Team information
- Current team: Sime Darby Plantation FC

Youth career
- 2009: Negeri Sembilan FA President Cup

Senior career*
Years	Team	Apps	(Gls)
2011–2012	Negeri Sembilan FA		
- * Club domestic league appearances and goals as of 21 May 2009 ‡ National team caps and goals as of 22 May 2009

Khairul Ridzwan Othman (born 7 October 1991 in Seremban, Negeri Sembilan) is a Malaysian footballer formerly playing for Negeri Sembilan FA in Malaysia Super League.
