= 2013 Negeri Sembilan FA season =

Negeri Sembilan
2013 season
- President: Mohammad Hassan
- Manager: Abdul Halim Abdul Latif
- Head Coach: Divaldo Alves (Until May 2013); Ridzuan Abu Shah (From May 2013)
- Stadium: Tuanku Abdul Rahman Stadium
- Malaysia Super League: 12th (relegated)
- FA Cup: Quarter-finals
- Malaysia Cup: Group stage
- Top goalscorer: League: Nazrin Nawi (2); Rashid Mahmud (2); Shahurain Abu Samah (2); All: Fábio Leandro Barbosa (6)
- Highest home attendance: 10,000 vs Kelantan (27 August 2013) vs Terengganu (21 September 2013)
- Lowest home attendance: 400 vs Perak (19 January 2013)
- Average home league attendance: 2,673
Home colours	Away colours	Third colours

The 2013 season was Negeri Sembilan's 8th season in Malaysia Super League since it was first introduced in 2004, the top flight of Malaysian football. The club finished 12th in the table and were relegated to the Malaysia Premier League.

== Review ==
=== Pre-season ===
Negeri Sembilan put eight new faces including two import players to cover Hoben Jang Hoben squad challenges in Super League 2013 season. Two import players are striker from Argentina, Emanuel De Porras and defender of Cameroon, William Paul Modibo offered a year contract as the latest backup squad Jangs in forming a strong team and the caliber of providing high quality performances for them to compete in the league . 8 new faces in squad of the 2013 season are Mohd Hamsani Ahmad, Abdul Ghani Rahman and S. Sivanesan (Felda United), Mohd Fauzi Nan (Kedah), Azmeer Yusof (Pos Malaysia), Eddy Helmi Abdul Manan (Johor FC), Mohd Alafi Mahmud (MP Muar) and Mohd Radzuan Abdullah promote from Negeri Sembilan President's. Players who remain with squad are Kaharuddin, Badrulzaman, Tengku Qayyum, Norhafiz Zamani, Mohd Zulfaizham Kamis, Rashid Mamud, Muszaki, Mohd Alif, Norismaidham, Shahurain, Idris Karim, Halim Zainal, Mohd Nazrin Mohd Nawi, Mohd Firdaus Azizul, Shakir Ali. While the 9 pillars of migratory jangs is Qhairul Anwar and Effa Owona choose not to renew the contract and join Terengganu, Farizal Marlias migrated to Perak, Shukor Adan to ATM, S. Kunanlan to Selangor, G. Mahathevan to T-Team Titans and PBNS release defender from Czechoslovakia, Marian Farbák, Vijayan Parameswaran and Mohd Shaffik Abdul Rahman.
Source: BERNAMA

== Club ==
=== Coaching staff ===
Position	Staff
General Manager	(Malaysia) Dato' Haji Abdul Halim bin Haji Abdul Latif
Assistant manager	(Malaysia) Hj. Zainordin A.Rahman
Head Team Coach	(Portugal) Divaldo Alves
Assistant Coach	(Malaysia) Ridzuan Abu Shah
Goalkeeping coach	(Malaysia) Yazid Yassin
Fitness coach	(Malaysia) Mashiedee Sulaiman
Physiotherapist	(Malaysia) Dr. Rozaiman Ebrahim (Malaysia) Zulkefli Abu Samah

Last updated: 11 January 2013

=== Other information ===
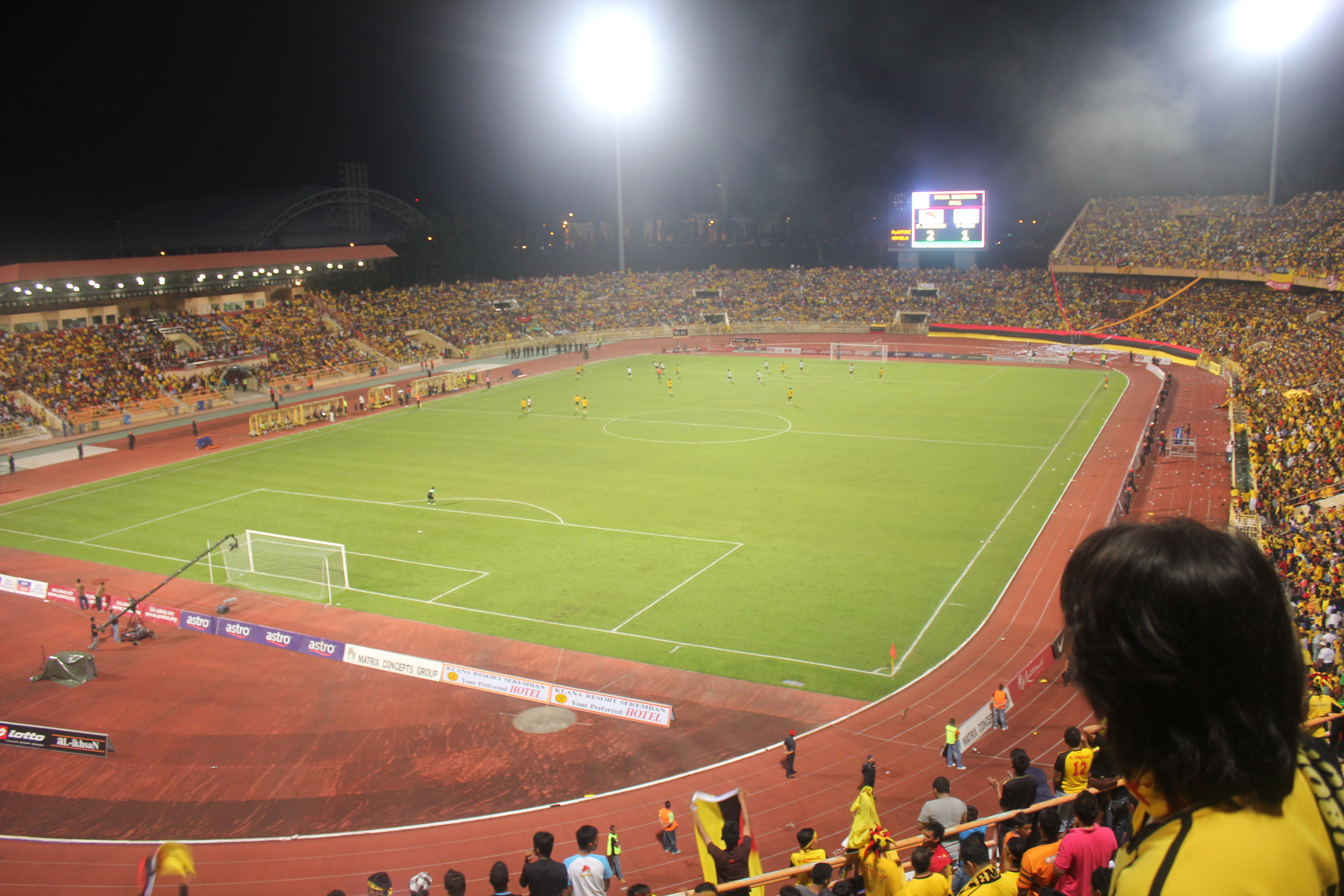
The Tuanku Abdul Rahman Stadium is of the largest stadiums in the Malaysia Super League.

President	(Malaysia) Dato' Seri Utama Mohammad Hassan
Secretary	(Malaysia) Dato' Haji Abdul Halim bin Haji Abdul Latif
Ground (capacity and dimensions)	Tuanku Abdul Rahman Stadium (40,000 / 120x70 metres)

Updated to match played 11 January 2013

=== Kit Manufacturers & Financial Sponsor ===
Nation	Corporation
Main sponsors
(Malaysia)	Matrix Concept Group
Shirt sponsors
(Italy)	

== Players ==
=== Full squad ===
No.	Name	Age	Nat.	Position	Join	Signed from	D.O.B	Notes
Goalkeepers
1	Kaharuddin Rahman	22	(Malaysia)	GK	2012	Negeri Sembilan FA U21	7 Aug. 1991	
21	Mohd Hamsani Ahmad	37	(Malaysia)	GK	2013	(Kuala Lumpur) Felda United F.C.	25 Feb. 1976	
22	Badrulzaman Abdul Halim	35	(Malaysia)	GK	2012	(Selangor) PKNS F.C.	2 Apr. 1978	
Defenders
2	Mohd Fauzi Nan	33	(Malaysia)	RB / CB	2013	Kedah FA	20 Jan. 1980	
3	Tengku Qayyum Ubaidillah Tengku Ahmad	27	(Malaysia)	LB	2007	Negeri Sembilan FA U21	5 Mar. 1986	
5	Norhafiz Zamani Misbah	32	(Malaysia)	CB / DM	2011	(Kuala Lumpur) PLUS F.C.	15 July 1981	Captain
6	William Modibo	34	(Cameroon)	CB	2013	(Portugal) C.D. Tondela	18 May 1979	Import
12	Mohd Radzuan Abdullah	22	(Malaysia)	CB	2013	Negeri Sembilan FA U21	18 Aug. 1991	
13	Abdul Ghani Rahman	28	(Malaysia)	CB	2013	(Kuala Lumpur) Felda United F.C.	12 Dis. 1985	
17	Mohd Alif Shamsudin	27	(Malaysia)	RB / DM	2009	Negeri Sembilan FA U21	1 Feb. 1986	
18	Mohd Fadhil Mohd Hashim	30	(Malaysia)	LB / CB	2013	(Selangor) PKNS F.C.	2 July 1983	
24	Mohd Zulfaizham Kamis	23	(Malaysia)	LB	2012	Kedah FA	17 Aug. 1990	
27	Fiqri Azwan Ghazali	21	(Malaysia)	LB	2010	Negeri Sembilan FA U21	30 Mar. 1992	
Midfielders
7	Idris Abdul Karim	37	(Malaysia)	DM / CM / AM	2005	Johor FC	29 Nov. 1976	
8	Muhammad Hafiz Husin	19	(Malaysia)	DM / CM / AM	2012	Negeri Sembilan FA U21	3 DECEMBER 1994	
9	Shahurain Abu Samah	27	(Malaysia)	RW / LW / ST	2006	Negeri Sembilan FA U21	23 Dis. 1986	
10	Abdul Halim Zainal	25	(Malaysia)	DM / CM / AM	2008	Negeri Sembilan FA U21	29 July 1988	
11	Eddy Helmi Abdul Manan	34	(Malaysia)	RW / LW	2013	Johor Darul Ta'zim F.C.	8 Dis. 1979	
15	Rashid Mahmud	35	(Malaysia)	DM / CM / CB	2012	(Kuala Lumpur) Felda United F.C.	26 Apr. 1978	Vice-captain
16	S. Sivanesan	23	(Malaysia)	DM / CM / AM / RW	2013	(Kuala Lumpur) Felda United F.C.	28 Dis. 1990	
23	Nazrin Nawi	25	(Malaysia)	LW	2012	Kuala Lumpur FA	7 Feb. 1988	
29	Muhamad Bukhairi Idris	21	(Malaysia)	DM / CM	2012	(Malaysia) Harimau Muda B	2 Jan. 1992	
Forwards
4	Mohd Amirul Omar	27	(Malaysia)	ST / AM	2013	Penang FA	23 Feb. 1986	
14	Mohd Alafi Mahmud	28	(Malaysia)	ST / RW / LW	2013	(Johor) MP Muar	29 Apr. 1985	
19	Mohd Firdaus Azizul	25	(Malaysia)	ST / RW / LW	2008	Negeri Sembilan FA U21	3 Jan. 1988	
20	Fábio Leandro Barbosa	35	(Brazil)	ST	2013	(Thailand) Army United F.C.	5 Dis. 1978	Import
25	Ahmad Shakir Mohd Ali	24	(Malaysia)	ST	2012	Kedah FA	5 Mar. 1989	
26	Mohd Rahizi Mohd Rasib	19	(Malaysia)	ST	2013	Perak FA U21	30 Sep. 1994	

== Transfers ==
=== Disember ===
In

No.	Pos.	Name	Age	From	Notes
2	DF	(Malaysia) Mohd Fauzi Nan	33	Kedah FA	
6	DF	(Cameroon) William Modibo	34	(Portugal) C.D. Tondela	Import
11	MF	(Malaysia) Eddy Helmi Abdul Manan	34	Johor Darul Ta'zim F.C.	
12	DF	(Malaysia) Mohd Radzuan Abdullah	22	Negeri Sembilan FA U21	Promoted
13	DF	(Malaysia) Abdul Ghani Rahman	28	(Kuala Lumpur) Felda United F.C.	
14	FW	(Malaysia) Mohd Alafi Mahmud	28	(Johor) MP Muar	
16	MF	(Malaysia) S. Sivanesan	23	(Kuala Lumpur) Felda United F.C.	
20	FW	(Argentina) Emanuel De Porras	32	(Argentina) Tristán Suárez	Import
21	GK	(Malaysia) Mohd Hamsani Ahmad	37	(Kuala Lumpur) Felda United F.C.	
23	DF	(Malaysia) Azmeer Yusof	23	(Kuala Lumpur) Pos Malaysia FC	
26	FW	(Malaysia) Mohd Rahizi Mohd Rasib	19	Perak FA U21	

Out

No.	Pos.	Name	Age	To	Notes
7	MF	(Malaysia) S. Kunanlan	27	Selangor FA	
10	FW	(Cameroon) Jean-Emmanuel Effa Owona	30	Terengganu FA	Import
11	MF	(Malaysia) Mohd Shaffik Abdul Rahman	29	Free Agent	
12	MF	(Malaysia) Shukor Adan	34	ATM FA	
13	DF	(Czechoslovakia) Marian Farbák	30	(Slovakia) TJ Jednota Brestovec	Import
14	DF	(Malaysia) G. Mahathevan	25	(Terengganu) T–Team F.C.	
16	DF	(Malaysia) Qhairul Anwar Roslani	26	Terengganu FA	
19	MF	(Malaysia) Parameswaran Vijayan	26	Free Agent	
25	GK	(Malaysia) Mohd Farizal Marlias	27	Perak FA	
26	FW	(Malaysia) Khairul Ridzwan Othman	22	(Kuala Lumpur) Sime Darby Plantation F.C.	
29	MF	(Malaysia) Abdul Rahman Abdul Ghani	22	Free Agent	
33	FW	(Malaysia) Khairul Izuan Abdullah	27	PDRM FA	Loan End
34	DF	(Malaysia) Azmeer Yusof	23	(Kuala Lumpur) Pos Malaysia F.C.	Loan End
35	MF	(Malaysia) K. Thanaraj	27	Sabah FA	Loan End

=== April ===
In

No.	Pos.	Name	Age	From	Notes
4	FW	(Malaysia) Mohd Amirul Omar	27	Penang FA	
18	DF	(Malaysia) Mohd Fadhil Mohd Hashim	30	(Selangor) PKNS F.C.	
20	FW	(Brazil) Fábio Leandro Barbosa	35	(Thailand) Army United F.C.	Import

Out

No.	Pos.	Name	Age	To	Notes
4	DF	(Malaysia) Azmeer Yusof	23	Free Agent	
18	DF	(Malaysia) Muszaki Abu Bakar	24	Free Agent	
20	FW	(Argentina) Emanuel De Porras	32	Free Agent	Import

== Non-competitive ==
=== Pre-season ===
Win Draw Loss

14 November 2012 1	Majlis Perbandaran Port Dickson (Negeri Sembilan)	0–4	Negeri Sembilan FA	Port Dickson
17:00			Mohd Firdaus Azizul; Idris Abdul Karim	Stadium: Padang Kelab Kilat TNB

16 November 2012 2	Telok Kemang FC (Negeri Sembilan)	0–3	Negeri Sembilan FA	Port Dickson
17:00			Mohd Nizam Ruslan; Mohd Alif Shamsudin	Stadium: Padang Kelab Kilat TNB

27 November 2012 3	Negeri Sembilan FA	3–0	Negeri Sembilan President's	Paroi
8:00	Ahmad Shakir Mohd Ali			Stadium: Tuanku Abdul Rahman Stadium

5 December 2012 4	PDRM FA	3–2	Negeri Sembilan FA	Kuala Lumpur
17:00	Khairul Izuan Abdullah		Mohd Alafi Mahmud	Stadium: Police Training Centre

13 December 2012 5	Negeri Sembilan FA	0–1	Sarawak FA	Paroi
17:00			Ivan Babić	Stadium: Tuanku Abdul Rahman Stadium

16 December 2012 6	Negeri Sembilan FA	0–1	Putrajaya SPA F.C.	Paroi
20:45			Goal	Stadium: Tuanku Abdul Rahman Stadium

23 December 2012 7	Semen Padang F.C.	2–1	Negeri Sembilan FA	Indonesia
16:45	Edward Junior Wilson 15', 45+2'		68' Emanuel De Porras	Stadium: Haji Agus Salim Stadium

30 December 2012 8	Negeri Sembilan FA	1–1	Semen Padang F.C.	Paroi
20:45	Mohd Nazrin Mohd Nawi 30'		90' Rudi	Stadium: Tuanku Abdul Rahman Stadium

=== Friendly Match ===
Win Draw Loss

3 February 2012 1	Sime Darby F.C. (Kuala Lumpur)	2–0	Negeri Sembilan FA	Selayang
20:45	Goal			Stadium: Majlis Perbandaran Selayang Stadium

11 February 2012 2	Negeri Sembilan FA	0–0	(Malaysia) Harimau Muda B	Paroi
20:45				Stadium: Tuanku Abdul Rahman Stadium

18 March 2013 3	Negeri Sembilan FA	4–1	(Kuala Lumpur) Pos Malaysia FC	Paroi
20:45	Mohd Nazrin Mohd Nawi; Shahurain Abu Samah; Import Trail (26); Import Trail (31)		Goal	Stadium: Tuanku Abdul Rahman Stadium

21 March 2013 4	Negeri Sembilan FA	3–3	Johor Darul Ta'zim II F.C.	Paroi
20:45	Anthony Wolfe (Import Trail); Mohd Firdaus Azizul; William Modibo		Goal	Stadium: Tuanku Abdul Rahman Stadium

== Competitions ==
=== Malaysia Super League ===
Pos	Team	Pld	W	D	L	GF	GA	GD	Pts	Qualification or relegation
8	PKNS	22	8	4	10	34	34	0	28	
9	Terengganu	22	7	6	9	25	31	−6	27	
10	T-Team	22	5	4	13	19	33	−14	19	
11	Felda United	22	4	7	11	13	35	−22	19	Relegation to 2014 Liga Premier
12	Negeri Sembilan	22	1	7	14	11	28	−17	10	Relegation to 2014 Liga Premier

Source: RSSSF
Rules for classification: 1) points; 2) goal difference; 3) number of goals scored

==== Matches ====
Win Draw Loss

8 January 2013 1	Selangor FA	1–0	Negeri Sembilan FA	Shah Alam
20:45	S. Kunanlan 69'			Stadium: Shah Alam Stadium; Attendance: 4,000; Referee: Suhaizi Shukri

11 January 2013 2	Negeri Sembilan FA	0–0	Terengganu FA	Paroi
20:45				Stadium: Tuanku Abdul Rahman Stadium; Attendance: 4,000

15 January 2013 3	Pahang FA	2–1	Negeri Sembilan FA	Kuantan
20:45	Mohd Fauzi Roslan 28'; Mohd Faizol Hussien 75'		88' Mohd Rahizi Mohd Rasib	Stadium: Darul Makmur Stadium; Attendance: 15,000; Referee: Ahmad Tajuddin

19 January 2013 4	Negeri Sembilan FA	0–1	Perak FA	Paroi
20:45			90+4' Mohd Failee Mohamad Ghazli	Stadium: Tuanku Abdul Rahman Stadium; Attendance: 400

22 January 2013 5	Kelantan FA	0–0	Negeri Sembilan FA	Kota Bharu
20:45				Stadium: Sultan Mohammad IV Stadium; Attendance: 700; Referee: Nagor Amir Nor Mohamed

16 February 2013 6	Negeri Sembilan FA	1–1	ATM FA	Paroi
20:45	Mohd Firdaus Azizul 34'		90' Norfazly Alias	Stadium: Tuanku Abdul Rahman Stadium; Attendance: 4,500; Referee: Samsudin Ibrahim

19 February 2013 7	PKNS F.C. (Selangor)	2–2	Negeri Sembilan FA	Selangor
20:45	Patrick Wleh 6' (pen.); Mohd Fauzan Dzulkifli 26'		12' Rashid Mahmud; 87' Shahurain Abu Samah	Stadium: Petaling Jaya Stadium; Attendance: 300; Referee: Muhammad Nazmi Nasaruddin

22 February 2013 8	Negeri Sembilan FA	0–0	(Terengganu) T-Team F.C.	Paroi
20:45				Stadium: Tuanku Abdul Rahman Stadium; Attendance: 2,000; Referee: Teoh Hee Loon

2 March 2013 9	Johor Darul Ta'zim F.C.	2–1	Negeri Sembilan FA	Johor Bahru
20:45	Kamarul Afiq Kamaruddin 88'; Mohd Nurul Azwan Roya 90+2'		29' Rashid Mahmud	Stadium: Larkin Stadium; Attendance: 25,000; Referee: Samsuddin Ibrahim

9 March 2013 10	Negeri Sembilan FA	0–1	(Kuala Lumpur) Felda United F.C.	Paroi
20:45			41' Razali Umar Kandasamy	Stadium: Tuanku Abdul Rahman Stadium; Attendance: 3,000; Referee: Zuhairi Shukri

30 March 2013 11	LionsXII (Singapore)	1–0	Negeri Sembilan FA	Singapore
19:45	Shahril Ishak 79'			Stadium: Jalan Besar Stadium; Attendance: 6,518; Referee: Amirul Izwan

13 April 2013 12	Negeri Sembilan FA	1–1	(Singapore) LionsXII	Paroi
20:45	Fabio Leandro Barbosa 16'		20' Fazrul Nawaz	Stadium: Tuanku Abdul Rahman Stadium; Attendance: 3,000; Referee: Mohammad Zamzaidi Katimin

19 April 2013 13	Negeri Sembilan FA	0–0	Selangor FA	Paroi
20:45				Stadium: Tuanku Abdul Rahman Stadium; Attendance: 2,000; Referee: Suhaizi Sukri

26 April 2013 14	Terengganu FA	1–0	Negeri Sembilan FA	Kuala Terengganu
16:45	Mohd Ashaari Shamsuddin 90+2'			Stadium: Sultan Ismail Nasiruddin Shah Stadium; Attendance: 2,700; Referee: Teo Hee Loon

7 May 2013 15	Perak FA	2–1	Negeri Sembilan FA	Ipoh
20:45	Paulo Rangel 22'; Azlan Ismail 61'		90+4' Mohd Nazrin Mohd Nawi	Stadium: Perak Stadium; Attendance: 14,000; Referee: Zulkarnain Bin Zakaria

10 May 2013 16	Negeri Sembilan FA	0–3	Kelantan FA	Paroi
20:45			31' Mohd Badhri Mohd Radzi; 76' Indra Putra Mahayuddin; 81' Mohd Nor Farhan Muhammad	Stadium: Tuanku Abdul Rahman Stadium; Attendance: 4,000; Referee: Teo Hee Loon

18 May 2013 17	ATM FA	1–2	Negeri Sembilan FA	Paroi
20:45	Hairuddin Omar 14'		2' Mohd Fauzi Nan; 20' Mohd Nazrin Mohd Nawi	Stadium: Tuanku Abdul Rahman Stadium; Attendance: 2,500; Referee: Azman Jamaluddin

22 May 2013 18	Negeri Sembilan FA	0–2	Pahang FA	Paroi
20:45			38' (pen.) Mohd Razman Roslan; 50' Damion Stewart	Stadium: Tuanku Abdul Rahman Stadium; Attendance: 3,000; Referee: Zulkifli Ahmad

22 June 2013 19	Negeri Sembilan FA	0–1	(Selangor) PKNS F.C.	Paroi
20:45			17' Nazmi Faiz	Stadium: Tuanku Abdul Rahman Stadium; Attendance: 1,000; Referee: Teoh Hee Loon

25 June 2013 20	T-Team F.C. (Terengganu)	2–1	Negeri Sembilan FA	Kuala Terengganu
20:45	Damir Ibrić 74' (pen.); George Boateng 84'		28' Shahurain Abu Samah	Stadium: Sultan Ismail Nasiruddin Shah Stadium; Attendance: 300; Referee: Muhammad Nazmi Bin Nasaruddin

2 July 2013 21	Negeri Sembilan FA	0–2	Johor Darul Ta'zim F.C.	Paroi
20:45			26' Jasazrin Jamaluddin; 70' Mohd Nurul Azwan Roya	Stadium: Tuanku Abdul Rahman Stadium; Attendance: 2,500; Referee: Teoh Hee Loon

6 July 2013 22	Felda United F.C. (Kuala Lumpur)	2–1	Negeri Sembilan FA	Bukit Jalil
20:45	Rudie Ramli 16'; Mohd Riduwan Ma'on 90+1'		52' Eddy Helmi	Stadium: National Stadium; Referee: Samsudin Ibrahim (Terengganu)

=== Malaysia FA Cup ===
==== Knockout stage ====
Win Draw Loss

26 January 2013 First round	UiTM F.C. (Selangor)	0–2	Negeri Sembilan FA	Shah Alam
16:15			6', 45' Emanuel De Porras	Stadium: UiTM Stadium; Attendance: 500; Referee: Sukri Abdul Rahman

26 February 2013 Second round	Pos Malaysia FC (Kuala Lumpur)	0–2	Negeri Sembilan FA	Selayang
16:15			25' Mohd Fauzi Nan; 43' Rashid Mahmud	Stadium: MPS Stadium; Attendance: 300; Referee: Wan Mohd Tarmizi

==== Quarter-finals ====
Win Draw Loss

6 April 2013 First leg	Negeri Sembilan FA	1–3	Terengganu FA	Paroi
20:45	Mohd Nazrin Mohd Nawi 73'		77' Effa Owona; 90+2' Mohd Ashaari Shamsuddin; 90+3' Ahmad Nordin Alias	Stadium: Tuanku Abdul Rahman Stadium; Attendance: 3,000; Referee: Syed Azhar Syed Kamar

16 April 2013 Second leg	Terengganu FA	3–0	Negeri Sembilan FA	Kuala Terengganu
16:45	Mohd Ashaari Shamsuddin 25'; Effa Owona 54', 71'			Stadium: Sultan Ismail Nasiruddin Shah Stadium; Attendance: 4,500; Referee: Suhaizi Sukri

Terengganu FA won 6–1 on aggregate and advanced to the Semi-finals.

=== Malaysia Cup ===
==== Play-off ====
Win Draw Loss

10 July 2013 Play-Off	Negeri Sembilan FA	4–0	Sabah FA	Shah Alam
21:45	Nazrin Nawi 10', 15' (pen.), 84'; Fabio Leandro 51'	Report		Stadium: Shah Alam Stadium; Referee: Nagor Amir

==== Group stage ====
Team	Pld	W	D	L	GF	GA	GD	Pts	KEL	PAH	NEG	TER
Kelantan FA (A)	6	3	2	1	13	6	+7	11		4–0	2–3	2–0
Pahang FA (A)	6	2	2	2	11	11	0	8	1–1		3–0	1–1
Negeri Sembilan FA	6	2	2	2	11	13	−2	8	1–1	3–5		2–2
Terengganu FA	6	1	2	3	6	11	−5	5	1–3	2–1	0–2	

Legend: Blue = home team win; Yellow = draw; Red = away team win.
(A) Advance to the 2013 Piala Malaysia quarter finals

Win Draw Loss

20 August 2013 1	Terengganu FA	0–2	Negeri Sembilan FA	Kuala Terengganu
20:45			51' Fabio Leandro; 53' S. Sivanesan	Stadium: Sultan Ismail Nasiruddin Shah Stadium; Attendance: 6,000; Referee: Syed Azhar Syed Kamar

24 August 2013 2	Negeri Sembilan FA	3–5	Pahang FA	Paroi
20:45	S. Sivanesan 49', 74', 77'		24' Mohd Azamuddin Md Akil; 51', 66' R. Gopinathan; 63' Matías Conti; 83' Mohd Amirul Hadi Zainal	Stadium: Tuanku Abdul Rahman Stadium; Attendance: 8,000; Referee: Suhaizi Sukri

27 August 2013 3	Negeri Sembilan FA	1–1	Kelantan FA	Paroi
20:45	Fabio Leandro Barbosa 60'		40' Dickson Nwakaeme	Stadium: Tuanku Abdul Rahman Stadium; Attendance: 10,000; Referee: Kamal Ahmad

31 August 2013 4	Kelantan FA	2–3	Negeri Sembilan FA	Kota Bharu
20:45	Indra Putra Mahayuddin 38'; Ahmad Fakri Saarani 49'		13' S. Sivanesan; 57', 78' Fabio Leandro Barbosa	Stadium: Sultan Mohammad IV Stadium; Attendance: 20,000; Referee: Syed Azhar Syed Kamar

17 September 2013 5	Pahang FA	3–0	Negeri Sembilan	Kuantan
20:45	Matías Conti 51'; R. Gopinathan 70'; Azidan Sarudin 84'			Stadium: Darul Makmur Stadium; Attendance: 9,000; Referee: Muhd Nazmi Nasaruddin

21 September 2013 6	Negeri Sembilan FA	2–2	Terengganu FA	Paroi
20:45	Fabio Leandro Barbosa 19'; Mohd Nazrin Mohd Nawi 70'		17' Jean-Emmanuel Effa Owona; 86' Mohd Ashaari Shamsuddin	Stadium: Tuanku Abdul Rahman Stadium; Attendance: 10,000; Referee: Wan Mohd Tarmizi Wan Ibrahim

== Season statistics ==
=== Top scorers ===
Rnk	Pos	No.	Player	Super League	FA Cup	Malaysia Cup	Total
1	FW	20	(Brazil) Fábio Leandro Barbosa	1	0	5	6
2	MF	16	(Malaysia) S. Sivanesan	0	0	5	5
3	MF	23	(Malaysia) Mohd Nazrin Mohd Nawi	2	1	1	4
4	MF	15	(Malaysia) Rashid Mahmud	2	1	0	3
5	MF	9	(Malaysia) Shahurain Abu Samah	2	0	0	2
5	DF	2	(Malaysia) Mohd Fauzi Nan	1	1	0	2
5	FW	20	(Argentina) Emanuel De Porras	0	2	0	2
6	FW	19	(Malaysia) Mohd Firdaus Azizul	1	0	0	1
6	MF	11	(Malaysia) Eddy Helmi Abdul Manan	1	0	0	1
6	FW	26	(Malaysia) Mohd Rahizi Mohd Rasib	1	0	0	1
Own goals				0	0	0	0
TOTALS				11	5	11	27

=== Disciplinary record ===
J	Pos	Nat.	Player	Super League			FA Cup			Malaysia Cup			Total			Notes
J	Pos	Nat.	Player	Yellow card	Double yellow card	Red card	Yellow card	Double yellow card	Red card	Yellow card	Double yellow card	Red card	Yellow card	Double yellow card	Red card	Notes
10	MF	(Malaysia)	Abdul Halim Zainal	4			2			1			7			
6	DF	(Haiti)	William Modibo	4			1			2			7			
2	DF	(Malaysia)	Mohd Fauzi Nan	5						1			6			
23	MF	(Malaysia)	Mohd Nazrin Mohd Nawi	5			1						6			
13	DF	(Malaysia)	Abdul Ghani Rahman	4		1				1			5		1	
15	MF	(Malaysia)	Rashid Mahmud	3						2			5			
17	DF	(Malaysia)	Mohd Alif Shamsudin	5									5			
11	MF	(Malaysia)	Eddy Helmi Abdul Manan	3			1						4			
9	MF	(Malaysia)	Shahurain Abu Samah	3									3			
8	MF	(Malaysia)	Norismaidham Ismail	3									3			
16	MF	(Malaysia)	S. Sivanesan	1	1					1			2	1		
21	GK	(Malaysia)	Mohd Hamsani Ahmad	2									2			
20	FW	(Brazil)	Fábio Leandro Barbosa	1						1			2			
25	FW	(Malaysia)	Ahmad Shakir Mohd Ali	1	1	1	1						2	1	1	
4	MF	(Malaysia)	Mohd Amirul Omar	2									2			
20	FW	(Argentina)	Emanuel De Porras	1									1			
19	FW	(Malaysia)	Mohd Firdaus Azizul	1									1			
22	GK	(Malaysia)	Badrulzaman Abdul Halim	1									1			
18	DF	(Malaysia)	Mohd Fadhil Mohd Hashim	1									1			
12	DF	(Malaysia)	Mohd Radzuan Abdullah							1			1			

= Number of bookings; = Number of sending offs after a second yellow card; = Number of sending offs by a direct red card.
