= 2012 Negeri Sembilan FA season =

Negeri Sembilan
2012 season
- President: Mohammad Hassan
- Manager: Abdul Halim Abdul Latif
- Head coach: Azraai Khor
- Stadium: Tuanku Abdul Rahman Stadium
- Malaysia Super League: 6th
- Charity Shield: Winners
- FA Cup: First round
- Malaysia Cup: Quarter-finals
- Top goalscorer: League: Jean-Emmanuel Effa Owona (15); All: Jean-Emmanuel Effa Owona (23)
Home colours	Away colours	Third colours

The 2012 season was Negeri Sembilan's 7th season in Malaysia Super League since it was first introduced in 2004, the top flight of Malaysian football.

Negeri Sembilan played in the Malaysian Super League and the Malaysian FA Cup. Negeri Sembilan qualified for the Malaysia Cup, after finishing 8th in the Super League, Negeri qualified to Malaysia Cup Final for the third time in a row this time with their new coach Mohd Azraai Khor Abdullah. They won the trophy after defeating Terengganu with an epic comeback. The first goal was scored by Mohd Ashaari Shamsuddin for Terengganu in the 59th minute. Negeri used the last 10 minutes of the game to make a comeback. S. Kunanlan equalised the score in the 81st minute before Hairuddin Omar, the veteran striker hit the winning goal for Negeri with a beautiful volley in the 85th minute. Negeri ended their FA campaign Second round, defeated by Kuala Lumpur on a penalty shoot out.

== Season review ==
Negeri Sembilan put nine new faces including two import players to cover Hoben Jang Hoben squad challenges in Super League 2012 season. Two import players are striker from Cameroon, Jean-Emmanuel Effa Owona and defender of Brazil, Gonçalves Ferreira Marquen offered a year contract as the latest backup squad Jangs in forming a strong team and the calibre of providing high quality performances for them to compete in the league . 7 new faces in squad of the 2012 season are Mohd Zulfaizham Kamis and Ahmad Shakir Mohd Ali (Kedah), Norismaidham Ismail and Mohd Nazrin Mohd Nawi (Kuala Lumpur), Rashid Mahmud (Felda United FC), Azmeer Yusof (Pos Malaysia FC) and Badrulzaman Abdul Halim (PKNS FC). Players who remain with squad are Kaharuddin, Tengku Qayyum, Mohd Firdaus Azizul, Norhafiz Zamani, S. Kunanlan, Shahurain, Mohd Shaffik Abdul Rahman, Shukor Adan, G. Mahathevan, Qhairul Anwar, Halim Zainal, Muszaki, Idris Karim, Alif Shamsudin and Farizal Marlias. While the 8 pillars of migratory jangs is Hairuddin Omar, Farizal Harun, Aidil Zafuan, Zaquan Adha and Irwan Fadzli Idrus choose not to renew the contract and join ATM, Fakri Saarani and Aminuddin migrated to Felda United and Hasmawi Hassan to Penang FA.

Although the import players Marquen Nuquen Gocalves Ferreira played in the J-League, Japan, but he later returned to her home country to play for clubs in Division 3. This situation is contrary to the conditions of import players for the 2012 Malaysian League championship last club of the countries of Latin America, Africa and Europe must be from Division 1 or 2, while in Asia, must be Division 1. PBNS to appeal to approve the import players from Brazil but FAM was told that all appeals for import players who have technical problems are not entertained and rejected.

== Club ==
=== Coaching staff ===
Position	Name
President	(Malaysia) Dato' Seri Utama Mohammad Hassan
Manager	(Malaysia) Dato' Haji Abd. Halim bin Haji Abd. Latif
Assistant manager	(Malaysia) Hamzah Mohd Nor
Head team coach	(Malaysia) Mohd Azraai Khor Abdullah
Assistant head coach	(Malaysia) Ahmad Osman
Goalkeeping coach	(Malaysia) Azhar Dol
Fitness coach	(Malaysia) Mashiedee Sulaiman
Physiotherapist	(Malaysia) Zulkefli Abu Samah
Team assistant	(Malaysia) Shahrizal Mat Sah
Media officer	(Malaysia) Hj. Abd. Malek Hj. Hasan
Medical officer	(Malaysia) Dr. Rozaiman Ebrahim

=== Kit manufacturers and financial sponsor ===
Nation	Corporation
Main sponsors
(Malaysia)	Negeri Roadstone Sdn Bhd
Shirt sponsors
(Italy)	

== Player information ==
=== Full squad ===
No.	Name	Age	Nationality	Position	Join	Signed from	Date of birth	Notes
Goalkeepers
1	Kaharuddin Rahman	21	(Malaysia)	GK	2012	Negeri Sembilan FA U21	7 August 1991	
22	Badrulzaman Abdul Halim	34	(Malaysia)	GK	2012	(Selangor) PKNS F.C.	2 April 1978	
25	Mohd Farizal Marlias	26	(Malaysia)	GK	2011	Perlis FA	29 June 1986	
Defenders
3	Tengku Qayyum Ubaidillah Tengku Ahmad	26	(Malaysia)	LB	2007	Negeri Sembilan FA U21	5 March 1986	
5	Norhafiz Zamani Misbah	31	(Malaysia)	CB / DM	2011	(Kuala Lumpur) PLUS F.C.	15 July 1981	Vice-captain
6	Mohd Zulfaizham Kamis	22	(Malaysia)	LB	2012	Kedah FA	17 August 1990	
13	Marian Farbák	29	(Czechoslovakia)	CB	2012	(Slovakia) 1. FC Tatran Prešov	10 February 1983	Import
14	G. Mahathevan	24	(Malaysia)	CB / DM	2011	(Selangor) PKNS F.C.	31 May 1988	
16	Qhairul Anwar Roslani	25	(Malaysia)	RB / DM	2007	Negeri Sembilan FA U21	22 January 1987	
18	Muszaki Abu Bakar	23	(Malaysia)	RB / DM	2011	(Malaysia) Harimau Muda B	15 March 1989	
24	Mohd Alif Shamsudin	26	(Malaysia)	RB / DM	2009	Negeri Sembilan FA U21	1 February 1986	
30	Fiqri Azwan Ghazali	20	(Malaysia)	LB	2010	Negeri Sembilan FA U21	30 March 1992	
34	Azmeer Yusof	22	(Malaysia)	LB / CB	2012	(Kuala Lumpur) Pos Malaysia F.C.	25 May 1990	Loan In
Midfielders
7	S. Kunanlan	26	(Malaysia)	RW / LW / RB	2007	Negeri Sembilan FA U21	15 September 1986	
8	Norismaidham Ismail	28	(Malaysia)	DM / CM / AM	2012	Kuala Lumpur FA	30 June 1984	
9	Shahurain Abu Samah	26	(Malaysia)	RW / LW / ST	2006	Negeri Sembilan FA U21	23 December 1986	
11	Mohd Shaffik Abdul Rahman	28	(Malaysia)	RW / LW	2008	(Kuala Lumpur) UPB-MyTeam F.C.	14 July 1984	
12	Shukor Adan	33	(Malaysia)	DM / CM / AM / CB	2009	Selangor FA	24 September 1979	Captain
15	Rashid Mahmud	34	(Malaysia)	DM / CM / CB	2012	(Kuala Lumpur) Felda United F.C.	26 April 1978	
17	Abdul Halim Zainal	24	(Malaysia)	DM / CM / AM	2008	Negeri Sembilan FA U21	29 July 1988	
19	Parameswaran Vijayan	25	(Malaysia)	RW / LW	2012	(Negeri Sembilan) Jempol Dream F.C.	9 July 1987	
20	Idris Abdul Karim	36	(Malaysia)	DM / CM / AM	2005	Johor FC	29 November 1976	
23	Nazrin Nawi	24	(Malaysia)	LW	2012	Kuala Lumpur FA	7 February 1988	
29	Abdul Rahman Abdul Ghani	21	(Malaysia)	DM / CM / AM	2012	Negeri Sembilan FA U21	13 February 1991	
27	Muhamad Bukhari Idris	20	(Malaysia)	DM / CM / AM	2012	(Malaysia) Harimau Muda B	2 January 1992	
35	K. Thanaraj	26	(Malaysia)	RW / LW	2012	Sabah FA	3 January 1986	Loan In
Forwards
4	Mohd Firdaus Azizul	24	(Malaysia)	ST / RW / LW	2008	Negeri Sembilan FA U21	3 January 1988	
10	Jean-Emmanuel Effa Owona	29	(Cameroon)	ST	2012	(United Arab Emirates) Hatta Club	26 December 1983	Import
21	Ahmad Shakir Mohd Ali	23	(Malaysia)	ST	2012	Kedah FA	5 March 1989	
26	Khairul Ridzwan Othman	21	(Malaysia)	ST	2010	Negeri Sembilan FA U21	7 October 1991	
33	Khairul Izuan Abdullah	26	(Malaysia)	ST / AM	2012	PDRM FA	16 May 1986	Loan In

== Transfers ==
In

No.	Pos.	Name	Age	From	Notes
1	GK	(Malaysia) Kaharuddin Rahman	21	Negeri Sembilan FA U21	Promoted
6	DF	(Malaysia) Mohd Zulfaizham Kamis	22	Kedah FA	
8	MF	(Malaysia) Norismaidham Ismail	28	Kuala Lumpur FA	
10	FW	(Cameroon) Jean-Emmanuel Effa Owona	29	(United Arab Emirates) Hatta Club	Import
13	DF	(Czechoslovakia) Marian Farbák	29	(Slovakia) 1. FC Tatran Prešov	Import
15	MF	(Malaysia) Rashid Mahmud	34	(Kuala Lumpur) Felda United F.C.	
19	MF	(Malaysia) Parameswaran Vijayan	25	(Negeri Sembilan) Jempol Dream F.C.	
21	FW	(Malaysia) Ahmad Shakir Mohd Ali	23	Kedah FA	
22	GK	(Malaysia) Badrulzaman Abdul Halim	34	(Selangor) PKNS F.C.	
23	MF	(Malaysia) Mohd Nazrin Mohd Nawi	24	Kuala Lumpur FA	
27	MF	(Malaysia) Abdul Rahman Abdul Ghani	21	Negeri Sembilan FA U21	Promoted
29	MF	(Malaysia) Muhamad Bukhari Idris	20	(Malaysia) Harimau Muda B	

Out

No.	Pos.	Name	Age	To	Notes
1	GK	(Malaysia) Muhammad Hanif Saied	19	(Selangor) UiTM F.C.	
7	DF	(Malaysia) Mohd Aidil Zafuan Abdul Radzak	25	ATM FA	
8	FW	(Malaysia) Mohd Zaquan Adha Abdul Radzak	25	ATM FA	
13	MF	(Malaysia) Ahmad Fakri Saarani	23	(Kuala Lumpur) Felda United F.C.	
15	FW	(Malaysia) Mohd Hasmawi Hassan	32	Penang FA	
20	FW	(Malaysia) Hairuddin Omar	33	ATM FA	
21	DF	(Malaysia) Irwan Fadzli Idrus	31	ATM FA	
22	GK	(Malaysia) Mohd Farizal Harun	26	ATM FA	
23	MF	(Malaysia) Ahmad Aminuddin Shaharudin	22	(Kuala Lumpur) Felda United F.C.	
29	MF	(Malaysia) Munir Amran	29	Pahang FA	Loan End

Loan For Malaysia Cup

No.	Pos.	Name	Age	From	Notes
33	FW	(Malaysia) Khairul Izuan Abdullah	26	PDRM FA	Loan In
34	DF	(Malaysia) Azmeer Yusof	22	(Kuala Lumpur) Pos Malaysia F.C.	Loan In
35	MF	(Malaysia) K. Thanaraj	26	Sabah FA	Loan In

== Non-competitive ==
=== Pre-season ===
Win Draw Loss

8 November 2011 1	Negeri Sembilan FA	0 – 2	Malaysia	Paroi
20:45			(pen.) Safiq Rahim	Stadium: Tuanku Abdul Rahman Stadium

21 November 2011 2	Negeri Sembilan FA	3 – 2	Bangladesh	Paroi
17:00	Effa Owona; Shukor Adan		Goal	Stadium: Tuanku Abdul Rahman Stadium

24 November 2011 3	Negeri Sembilan FA	0 – 3	(Kuala Lumpur) Sime Darby F.C.	Paroi
17:00			Rosli Muda; Patrick Wleh	Stadium: Tuanku Abdul Rahman Stadium

29 November 2011 4	Negeri Sembilan FA	3 – 1	Kelantan FA	Paroi
20:45	Effa Owona 49'; Idris Karim 61'; S. Kunanlan 77'		72' Denny Antwi	Stadium: Tuanku Abdul Rahman Stadium

9 December 2011 5	Maybank F.C. (Malaysia)	0 – 2	Negeri Sembilan FA	Bangi
17:00			Effa Owona; Shakir Ali	Stadium: Maybank Sports Centre

17 December 2011 6	Negeri Sembilan FA	1 – 2	Johor FA	Tampin
17:00	Shakir Ali		Goal	Stadium: Tampin Mini Stadium

21 December 2011 7	Gosnells City FC (Australia)	1 – 1	Negeri Sembilan FA	Perth
	Goal		Shakir Ali	Stadium: Walter Padbury Reserve

23 December 2011 8	Armadale SC	1 – 1	Negeri Sembilan FA	Perth
	Goal		Shakir Ali	Stadium: Alfred Skeet Oval

28 December 2011 9	Negeri Sembilan FA	2 – 0	PDRM FA	Paroi
	Shakir Ali 66', 87'			Stadium: Tuanku Abdul Rahman Stadium

3 January 2012 10	Negeri Sembilan FA	3 – 0	(Malaysia) Harimau Muda B	Paroi
	Effa Owona 21', 64', 72'			Stadium: Tuanku Abdul Rahman Stadium

=== Friendlies ===
Win Draw Loss

28 February 2012 1	Negeri Sembilan FA	1 – 0	ATM FA	Paroi
20:45	Idris Abdul Karim 38'			Stadium: Tuanku Abdul Rahman Stadium

9 March 2012 2	Negeri Sembilan FA	0 – 1	(Kuala Lumpur) Pos Malaysia F.C.	Paroi
20:45			85' Azmeer Yusof	Stadium: Tuanku Abdul Rahman Stadium

25 March 2012 3	Negeri Sembilan FA	2 – 2	Persebaya 1927	Paroi
20:45	Effa Owona 53', 73'	Report	9' Mario Karlovic; 45+4' Mat Halil	Stadium: Tuanku Abdul Rahman Stadium; Attendance: 10,000; Referee: Nagor Amir Noor Mohamed

19 May 2012 4	Persebaya 1927	4 – 1	Negeri Sembilan FA	Surabaya
20:20	Fernando Gaston Soler 4', 13', 29', 50'		61' Rashid Mahmud	Stadium: Gelora Bung Tomo Stadium; Attendance: 50,000; Referee: Retu Slamet Wijaya

1 June 2012 5	Negeri Sembilan FA	5 – 0	Selangor Malays F.C.	Paroi
20:45	Khairul Ridzwan Othman; Shukor Adan; Nazrin Nawi			Stadium: Tuanku Abdul Rahman Stadium

6 June 2012 6	Negeri Sembilan FA	2 – 1	(Kuala Lumpur) Pos Malaysia F.C.	Paroi
20:45	Nazrin Nawi; Bukhairi Idris		Goal	Stadium: Tuanku Abdul Rahman Stadium

10 June 2012 7	Negeri Sembilan FA	9 – 0	(Malaysia) KPKT	Paroi
20:45	Fiqri Azwan Ghazali 12', 20' Nor Khairy; Effa Owona; Khairul Ridzwan Othman			Stadium: Tuanku Abdul Rahman Stadium

28 July 2012 8	Negeri Sembilan FA	1 – 0	(Malacca) RAMD Sungai Udang	Paroi
22:00	Mohd Firdaus Azizul (pen.)			Stadium: Tuanku Abdul Rahman Stadium

4 August 2012 9	Negeri Sembilan FA	6 – 0	(Selangor) UiTM F.C.	Paroi
22:30	Khairul Izuan Abdullah; Effa Owona (pen.); Shukor Adan; K. Thanaraj			Stadium: Tuanku Abdul Rahman Stadium

11 August 2012 10	Negeri Sembilan FA	3 – 2	Johor FA	Paroi
22:30	Effa Owona 10'; Mohd Firdaus Azizul 28'; Khairul Izuan Abdullah 84'		35' (pen.), 50' Muriel Orlando	Stadium: Tuanku Abdul Rahman Stadium

16 August 2012 11	Negeri Sembilan FA	2 – 1	Johor FC	Paroi
22:30	Khairul Izuan Abdullah 27'; Mohd Nizam Ruslan 54'		87'	Stadium: Tuanku Abdul Rahman Stadium

== Competitions ==
=== Malaysia Charity Shield ===
Win Draw Loss

7 January 2012 Final	Kelantan FA	1 – 2	Negeri Sembilan FA	Bukit Jalil
20:45	Norshahrul Idlan Talaha 19'		30', 63' Effa Owona	Stadium: National Stadium; Attendance: 25,000; Referee: Mohd Shokri Nor

=== Malaysia Super League ===
==== League table ====
Pos	Team	Pld	W	D	L	GF	GA	GD	Pts
4	Perak	26	13	3	10	40	43	−3	42
5	Terengganu	26	11	8	7	41	33	+8	41
6	Negeri Sembilan	26	10	7	9	41	38	+3	37
7	PKNS	26	8	11	7	35	35	0	35
8	T-Team	26	10	5	11	35	36	−1	35

Source: RSSSF
Rules for classification: 1) points; 2) goal difference; 3) number of goals scored

==== Matches ====
Win Draw Loss

10 January 2012 1	Negeri Sembilan FA	2 – 2	Selangor FA	Paroi
20:45	Effa Owona 4', 35' (pen.)		66' Mohd Amirul Hadi Zainal; 74' (pen.) Mohd Safiq Rahim	Stadium: Tuanku Abdul Rahman Stadium

14 January 2012 2	Johor FC	0 – 2	Negeri Sembilan FA	Pasir Gudang
20:45			32', 48' Ahmad Shakir Mohd Ali	Stadium: JCorp Stadium

17 January 2012 3	Perak FA	2 – 1	Negeri Sembilan FA	Ipoh
20:45	Akmal Rizal Ahmad Rakhli 38', 50'		5' Effa Owona	Stadium: Perak Stadium; Referee: Ku Alaudin Ku Mohamad

21 January 2012 4	Negeri Sembilan FA	1 – 0	(Kuala Lumpur) Felda United F.C.	Paroi
20:45	Shahurain Abu Samah 53'			Stadium: Tuanku Abdul Rahman Stadium; Attendance: 10,000; Referee: Azman Jamaludin

26 January 2012 5	Sarawak FA	2 – 2	Negeri Sembilan FA	Kuching
20:45	Kalle Sonne 51' (pen.); Zamri Morshidi 86'		45' Shakir Ali; 79' Shukor Adan	Stadium: Sarawak Stadium; Attendance: 25,000

8 February 2012 6	Negeri Sembilan FA	2 – 1	(Terengganu) T-Team F.C.	Paroi
20:45	Effa Owona 45+2'; Shakir Ali 66'		37' Zairo Anuar Zalani	Stadium: Tuanku Abdul Rahman Stadium; Referee: Abu Bakar Mat Noor

11 February 2012 7	Singapore LIONSXII	3 – 1	Negeri Sembilan FA	Singapore
19:45	Shahril Ishak 37' (pen.), 60'; Shahdan Sulaiman 49'		90+3' Mohd Firdaus Azizul	Stadium: Jalan Besar Stadium; Attendance: 8,000; Referee: Nagor Amir Noor Mohamed

14 February 2012 8	Negeri Sembilan FA	1 – 1	(Selangor) PKNS F.C.	Paroi
20:45	Effa Owona 45'		43' (pen.) Paulo Sérgio Ferreira Gomes	Stadium: Tuanku Abdul Rahman Stadium; Referee: Kamal Ahmad

4 March 2012 9	Kelantan FA	2 – 1	Negeri Sembilan FA	Kota Bharu
19:45	Mohd Badri Mohd Radzi 2'; S. Chanturu 90+4'		53' Shakir Ali	Stadium: Sultan Mohammad IV Stadium; Attendance: 25,000; Referee: Zamzaidi Katimin

17 March 2012 10	Negeri Sembilan FA	2 – 1	Kedah FA	Paroi
20:45	Effa Owona 25'; S. Kunanlan 41'		60' Baddrol Bakhtiar	Stadium: Tuanku Abdul Rahman Stadium; Referee: Nagor Amir Noor Mohamed

30 March 2012 11	Kuala Lumpur FA	1 – 2	Negeri Sembilan FA	Malacca
19:45	Afiq Azmi 8'		13' (pen.) Shakir Ali; 77' Shahurain Abu Samah	Stadium: Hang Tuah Stadium; Attendance: 600; Referee: Mohd Nafeez Abd Wahab

7 April 2012 12	Negeri Sembilan FA	2 – 2	Sabah FA	Paroi
20:45	Effa Owona 51'; Shukor Adan 57'		74' Sharudin Yakup; 77' Ronny Harun	Stadium: Tuanku Abdul Rahman Stadium; Referee: Wan Mohd Tarmizi Wan Ibrahim

14 April 2012 13	Terengganu FA	1 – 0	Negeri Sembilan FA	Terengganu
20:45	S. Kunanlan 71' (O.G.)			Stadium: Sultan Ismail Nasiruddin Shah Stadium; Referee: Mohd Rahmat Jantan

17 April 2012 14	Negeri Sembilan FA	1 – 1	Terengganu FA	Paroi
20:45	Effa Owona 22'		4' (pen.) Forkey Doe	Stadium: Tuanku Abdul Rahman Stadium

8 May 2012 15	Selangor FA	1 – 3	Negeri Sembilan FA	Shah Alam
20:45	Boško Balaban 90+4'		2' Mohd Firdaus Azizul; 35', 63' Shakir Ali	Stadium: Shah Alam Stadium

12 May 2012 16	Negeri Sembilan FA	2 – 1	Johor FC	Paroi
20:45	Effa Owona 42'; Shakir Ali 69'		38' (pen.) Fernando de Abreu	Stadium: Tuanku Abdul Rahman Stadium

15 May 2012 17	Negeri Sembilan FA	3 – 1	Perak FA	Paroi
20:45	Effa Owona 25', 66'; Marian Farbák 83'		6' (pen.) Michal Kubala	Stadium: Tuanku Abdul Rahman Stadium; Referee: Mohd Rahmat Jantan

16 June 2012 18	Felda United F.C. (Kuala Lumpur)	1 – 0	Negeri Sembilan FA	Malacca
20:45	Farderin Kadir 75'			Stadium: Hang Jebat Stadium; Referee: Mohd Fairuzi Mat Desa

19 June 2012 19	Negeri Sembilan FA	3 – 1	Sarawak FA	Paroi
20:45	Shahurain Abu Samah 33'; Mohd Alif Shamsudin 51'; Effa Owona 55'		57' Khairul Azahar Eidros	Stadium: Tuanku Abdul Rahman Stadium

23 June 2012 20	T-Team F.C. (Terengganu)	1 – 1	Negeri Sembilan FA	Terengganu
20:45	Mohd Faiz Subri 62'		54' Effa Owona	Stadium: Sultan Ismail Nasiruddin Shah Stadium; Attendance: 500; Referee: Kamal Ahmad

3 April 2012 21	Negeri Sembilan FA	2 – 4	Singapore LIONSXII	Paroi
20:45	G. Mahathevan 32'; Shukor Adan 85'		14' Safuwan Baharudin; 20' Khairul Nizam; 42'bShahril Ishak; 69' Shahdan Sulaiman	Stadium: Tuanku Abdul Rahman Stadium; Referee: Abu Bakar Mohd Nor

30 June 2012 22	PKNS F.C. (Selangor)	2 – 1	Negeri Sembilan FA	Kelana Jaya
20:45	Goal		8' Mohd Firdaus Azizul	Stadium: Petaling Jaya Stadium

3 July 2012 23	Negeri Sembilan FA	2 – 3	Kelantan FA	Paroi
20:45	Mohd Firdaus Azizul 14'; Muhammad Shukor Adan 86'		46' Azlan Ismail; 63' Mohammed Ghaddar; 68' Indra Putra Mahayuddin	Stadium: Tuanku Abdul Rahman Stadium; Referee: Suhaimi Mat Hassan

7 July 2012 24	Kedah FA	0 – 2	Negeri Sembilan FA	Alor Star
20:45			43' Effa Owona; 82' S. Kunanlan	Stadium: Darul Aman Stadium

10 July 2012 25	Negeri Sembilan FA	1 – 1	Kuala Lumpur FA	Paroi
20:45	Ahmad Shakir Mohd Ali 54'		90' Pritam Singh	Stadium: Tuanku Abdul Rahman Stadium

14 July 2012 26	Sabah FA	3 – 1	Negeri Sembilan FA	Kota Kinabalu
20:45	Hendrik Helmke 27' (pen.); Sharudin Yakup 76'; Bobby Gonzales 90+2'		41' Effa Owona	Stadium: Likas Stadium

=== Malaysia FA Cup ===
==== Knockout stage ====
Win Draw Loss

18 February 2012 First round	Negeri Sembilan FA	1 – 2	Johor FC	Paroi
20:45	Jean-Emmanuel Effa Owona 30'		25', 80' Arthuro Henrique Bernhardt	Stadium: Tuanku Abdul Rahman Stadium; Referee: Mohd Amirul Izwan Yaacob

=== Malaysia Cup ===
==== Group stage ====
Pos	Team	Pld	W	D	L	GF	GA	GD	Pts
1	Negeri Sembilan FA (A)	6	2	4	0	8	3	+5	10
2	(Kuala Lumpur) Felda United FC (A)	6	1	4	1	13	12	+1	7
3	Perak FA	6	1	3	2	7	9	−2	6
4	(Kuala Lumpur) Sime Darby FC	6	1	3	2	9	13	−4	6

(A) Advanced to knockout stage

Win Draw Loss

22 August 2012 1	Felda United F.C. (Kuala Lumpur)	1 – 1	Negeri Sembilan FA	Hang Jebat Stadium
20:45	Eddy Viator 82'		50' Khairul Izuan Abdullah

25 August 2012 2	Negeri Sembilan FA	4 – 0	(Kuala Lumpur) Sime Darby F.C.	Paroi
20:45	Effa Owona 2', 60', 77'; Khairul Izuan Abdullah 51'			Stadium: Tuanku Abdul Rahman Stadium; Attendance: 6,000; Referee: Sew Tian Hu

28 August 2012 3	Negeri Sembilan FA	0 – 0	Perak FA	Paroi
20:45				Stadium: Tuanku Abdul Rahman Stadium; Referee: Nagor Amir Noor Mohamed

1 September 2012 4	Perak FA	0 – 1	Negeri Sembilan FA	Ipoh
20:45			45+2' (pen.) Effa Owona	Stadium: Perak Stadium; Referee: Kamal Ahmad

4 September 2012 5	Sime Darby F.C. (Kuala Lumpur)	1 – 1	Negeri Sembilan FA	Selayang
20:45	Patrick Wleh 10'		Mohd Alif Shamsudin 61'	Stadium: Majlis Perbandaran Selayang Stadium; Referee: Azhar Musa

14 September 2012 6	Negeri Sembilan FA	1 – 1	(Kuala Lumpur) Felda United F.C.	Paroi
20:45	Effa Owona 76'		Farderin Kadir	Stadium: Tuanku Abdul Rahman Stadium; Referee: Azham Musa

==== Quarter-finals ====
Win Draw Loss

28 September 2012 First leg	ATM FA	3 – 2	Negeri Sembilan FA	Petaling Jaya
20:45	Christie Jayaseelan 56'; Bruno Martelotto 61'; Hairuddin Omar 80'		74' Mohd Firdaus Azizul; 89' Shakir Ali	Stadium: Petaling Jaya Stadium; Referee: Muhd Nazmi Nasaruddin

2 October 2012 Second leg	Negeri Sembilan FA	1 – 3	ATM FA	Paroi
20:45	Mohd Alif Shamsudin 5'		7' Mohd Aidil Zafuan Abdul Radzak; 42', 58' Marlon Alex James	Stadium: Tuanku Abdul Rahman Stadium; Attendance: 30,000; Referee: Muhd Zamzaidi

ATM FA won 6–3 on aggregate and advanced to the Semi-finals.

== Season statistics ==
=== Top scorers ===
Rnk	Pos	No.	Player	Super League	FA Cup	Malaysia Cup	Charity Shield	Total
1	FW	10	(Cameroon) Jean-Emmanuel Effa Owona	15	1	5	2	23
2	FW	21	(Malaysia) Ahmad Shakir Mohd Ali	10	0	1	0	11
3	FW	4	(Malaysia) Mohd Firdaus Azizul	4	0	1	0	5
4	MF	12	(Malaysia) Shukor Adan	4	0	0	0	4
5	MF	9	(Malaysia) Shahurain Abu Samah	3	0	0	0	3
5	DF	24	(Malaysia) Mohd Alif Shamsudin	1	0	2	0	3
6	MF	7	(Malaysia) S. Kunanlan	2	0	0	0	2
6	FW	33	(Malaysia) Khairul Izuan Abdullah	0	0	2	0	2
7	DF	13	(Czechoslovakia) Marian Farbák	1	0	0	0	1
7	DF	14	(Malaysia) G. Mahathevan	1	0	0	0	1
Own goals				0	0	0	0	0
TOTALS				41	1	11	2	55

=== Disciplinary record ===
J	Pos	Nat.	Player	Super League			FA Cup			Malaysia Cup			Charity Shield			Total			Notes
J	Pos	Nat.	Player	Yellow card	Double yellow card	Red card	Yellow card	Double yellow card	Red card	Yellow card	Double yellow card	Red card	Yellow card	Double yellow card	Red card	Yellow card	Double yellow card	Red card	Notes
10	FW	(Malaysia)	Jean-Emmanuel Effa Owona	8			1			3			1			13			
15	MF	(Malaysia)	Rashid Mahmud	6						2			1			9			
24	DF	(Malaysia)	Mohd Alif Shamsudin	6						2			1			9			
13	DF	(Malaysia)	Marian Farbák	5	1					3						8	1		
12	MF	(Malaysia)	Shukor Adan	4						2						6			
6	DF	(Malaysia)	Mohd Zulfaizham Kamis	5												5			
18	DF	(Malaysia)	Muszaki Abu Bakar	3			1									4			
21	FW	(Malaysia)	Ahmad Shakir Mohd Ali	4												4			
20	MF	(Malaysia)	Idris Abdul Karim	1		1				3						4		1	
8	MF	(Malaysia)	Norismaidham Ismail	3	1					1						4	1		
17	MF	(Malaysia)	Abdul Halim Zainal	2									1			3			
4	FW	(Malaysia)	Mohd Firdaus Azizul	2						1						3			
25	GK	(Malaysia)	Mohd Farizal Marlias	3		1										3		1	
35	MF	(Malaysia)	K. Thanaraj							3						3			
34	DF	(Malaysia)	Azmeer Yusof							2						2			
23	MF	(Malaysia)	Nazrin Nawi	1												1			
3	DF	(Malaysia)	Tengku Qayyum Ubaidillah Tengku Ahmad	1												1			
9	MF	(Malaysia)	Shahurain Abu Samah	1												1			
29	MF	(Malaysia)	Muhamad Bukhairi Idris	1												1			
7	MF	(Malaysia)	S. Kunanlan			2												2	

= Number of bookings; = Number of sending offs after a second yellow card; = Number of sending offs by a direct red card.
