= 2010 Negeri Sembilan FA season =

Negeri Sembilan
2010 season
- President: Mohammad Hassan
- Manager: Abdul Halim Abdul Latif
- Head Coach: Wan Jamak Wan Hassan
- Stadium: Tuanku Abdul Rahman Stadium
- Charity Shield: Runners-up
- Malaysia Super League: 6th
- FA Cup: Winners
- Malaysia Cup: Runners-up
- Top goalscorer: League: Zaquan Adha (8); All: Zaquan Adha (14)
Home colours	Away colours	Third colours

The 2010 season was Negeri Sembilan's 5th season in Malaysia Super League since it was first introduced in 2004, the top flight of Malaysian football.

Negeri Sembilan played in the Malaysian Super League and the Malaysian FA Cup. Negeri Sembilan qualified for the Malaysia Cup, after finishing seventh in the Super League, Negeri qualified for the Malaysia Cup final for the first time with their coach Wan Jamak Wan Hassan. They won the trophy after defeating Kelantan FA. Midfielder Shahurain Abu Samah capitalised on a defensive mix-up in the Kelantan box to open the scoring in the 18th minute before on-loan Malaysian international striker Hairuddin Omar doubled the lead a minute into the second half. Mohd Zaquan Adha Abdul Radzak put the result beyond doubt when he converted a penalty in the 58th minute after Shahurain Abu Samah was brought down. Kelantan, who were chasing their first Malaysia Cup title after finishing runner-up, scored a consolation goal in stoppage time through a free-kick from striker Indra Putra Mahayuddin, the competition's leading scorer. Negeri ended their FA campaign at Semi-Final, defeated by Kelantan FA.

== Season review ==
Three new faces in the squad of the 2010 season were Kaharuddin Rahman, Fiqri Azwan Ghazali and Mohd Norizam Salaman. While six who chose not to renew their contracts were Muhd Arif Ismail, K. Ravindran, Mohd Affify Khusli, Muhamad Asyriff Afiq Shahrulzaman, I. Arulchelvan and Mohd Faiz Isa.

== Club ==
=== Coaching staff ===
Position	Name
President	(Malaysia) Datuk Seri Utama Haji Mohammad Haji Hassan
Manager	(Malaysia) Dato' Haji Abd. Halim bin Haji Abd. Latif
Assistant Manager	(Malaysia) Faizal Zainal
Head team coach	(Malaysia) Wan Jamak Wan Hassan
Assistant head coach	(Malaysia) Ahmad Osman
Goalkeeping coach	(Malaysia) Azhar Dol
Fitness coach	(Malaysia) Mashiedee Sulaiman
Physiotherapist	(Malaysia) Mashiedee Sulaiman
Team Assistant	(Malaysia) Harun Ismail
Media Officer	(Malaysia) Hj. Abd. Malek Hj. Hasan
Medical Officer	(Malaysia) Dr. Rozaiman Ebrahim

=== Kit manufacturers and financial sponsor ===
Nation	Corporation
Main sponsors
(Malaysia)	
Shirt sponsors
(Italy)	Kappa

== Player information ==
=== Full squad ===
No.	Name	Age	Nat.	Position	Join	Signed from	D.O.B	Notes
Goalkeepers
1	Kaharuddin Rahman	19	(Malaysia)	GK	2010	Negeri Sembilan FA U21	7 Aug. 1991	
21	Sani Anuar Kamsani	27	(Malaysia)	GK	2009	PDRM FA	5 Apr. 1983	
22	Mohd Farizal Harun	24	(Malaysia)	GK	2007	Negeri Sembilan FA U21	2 Feb. 1986	
26	Muhd Shahruddin Ismail	26	(Malaysia)	GK	2010	(Kuala Lumpur) Pos Malaysia F.C.	28 Mar. 1984	Loan In
Defenders
2	Mohd Rahman Zabul	28	(Malaysia)	RB / CB	2002	Negeri Sembilan FA U21	25 July 1982	
3	Tengku Qayyum Ubaidillah Tengku Ahmad	24	(Malaysia)	LB	2007	Negeri Sembilan FA U21	5 Mar. 1986	
4	Mohd Affandy Adimel	24	(Malaysia)	RB / DM	2006	Negeri Sembilan FA U21	30 June 1986	
5	Mohd Alif Shamsudin	24	(Malaysia)	RB / DM	2009	Negeri Sembilan FA U21	1 Feb. 1986	
7	Mohd Aidil Zafuan Abdul Radzak	23	(Malaysia)	CB	2006	Negeri Sembilan FA U21	3 Aug. 1987	
11	Syamsol Sabtu	25	(Malaysia)	CB	2005	Negeri Sembilan FA U21	30 Aug. 1985	
15	Ching Hong Aik	37	(Malaysia)	LB	2003	Sarawak FA	30 Nov. 1973	
16	Qhairul Anwar Roslani	23	(Malaysia)	RB / DM	2007	Negeri Sembilan FA U21	22 Jan. 1987	
24	Mohd Syukri Ismail	24	(Malaysia)	CB / RB	2006	Negeri Sembilan FA U21	12 Jan. 1986	
30	Fiqri Azwan Ghazali	18	(Malaysia)	LB	2010	Negeri Sembilan FA U21	30 Mar. 1992	
Midfielders
6	S. Kunanlan	24	(Malaysia)	RW / LW / RB	2006	Negeri Sembilan FA U21	15 Sep. 1986	
9	Shahurain Abu Samah	24	(Malaysia)	RW / LW / ST	2006	Negeri Sembilan FA U21	23 Dis. 1986	
10	Mohd Shaffik Abdul Rahman	26	(Malaysia)	RW / LW	2008	(Kuala Lumpur) UPB-MyTeam F.C.	14 July 1984	
12	Shukor Adan	31	(Malaysia)	DM / CM / AM / CB	2009	Selangor FA	24 Sep. 1979	Vice-captain
14	K. Thanaraj	24	(Malaysia)	RW / LW	2005	Negeri Sembilan FA U21	3 Jan. 1986	
17	Idris Abdul Karim	34	(Malaysia)	DM / CM / AM	2005	Johor FC	29 Nov. 1976	
20	Abdul Halim Zainal	22	(Malaysia)	DM / CM / AM	2008	Negeri Sembilan FA U21	29 July 1988	
23	Rezal Zambery Yahya	32	(Malaysia)	DM / CM	2005	Johor FC	10 Okt. 1978	Captain
28	Mohd Asyraf Al-Japri	20	(Malaysia)	RW / LW / ST	2007	Negeri Sembilan FA U21	17 May 1990	
Forwards
8	Mohd Zaquan Adha Abdul Radzak	23	(Malaysia)	ST	2006	Negeri Sembilan FA U21	3 Aug. 1987	
18	Mohd Norizam Salaman	26	(Malaysia)	ST	2010	Johor FA	6 Mar. 1984	
19	Mohd Firdaus Azizul	22	(Malaysia)	ST / RW / LW	2008	Negeri Sembilan FA U21	3 Jan. 1988	
27	L. Rajesh	30	(Malaysia)	ST	2010	Johor FA	27 Oct. 1980	Loan In

== Transfers ==
=== In ===
No.	Pos.	Name	Age	From	Notes
1	GK	(Malaysia) Kaharuddin Rahman	19	Negeri Sembilan FA U21	Promoted
18	FW	(Malaysia) Mohd Norizam Salaman	26	Johor FA	
30	DF	(Malaysia) Fiqri Azwan Ghazali	18	Negeri Sembilan FA U21	Promoted

=== Out ===
No.	Pos.	Name	Age	To	Notes
1	GK	(Malaysia) Mohd Asyriff Afiq Shahrul Zaman	20	Free agent	
3	DF	(Malaysia) Mohd Khairul Azwan		Free agent	
5	DF	(Malaysia) Muhd Arif Ismail	24	Perak FA	
10	FW	(Malaysia) K. Ravindran	21	(Malaysia) Harimau Muda A	
13	MF	(Malaysia) Mohd Faiz Mohd Isa	24	(Kuala Lumpur) Sime Darby F.C.	
18	DF	(Malaysia) I. Arulchelvan		Free agent	
19	MF	(Malaysia) Mohd Affify Khusli	24	Perlis FA	
27	FW	(Malaysia) Hairuddin Omar	31	(Terengganu) T-Team F.C.	Loan End
30	DF	(Malaysia) P. Kesavan	24	Free agent	
31	MF	(Malaysia) V. Parameswaran	23	(Negeri Sembilan) Jempol Dream F.C.	

=== Loan for Malaysia Cup ===
No.	Pos.	Name	Age	From	Notes
26	GK	(Malaysia) Muhd Shahruddin Ismail	26	(Kuala Lumpur) Pos Malaysia F.C.	Loan In
27	FW	(Malaysia) L. Rajesh	30	Johor FA	Loan In

== Non-competitive ==
Win Draw Loss

=== Friendly match ===
17 August 2010 1	Negeri Sembilan FA	2 - 2	RAMD Kem Terendak	Paroi
20:45	Goal		Goal	Stadium: Tuanku Abdul Rahman Stadium

20 August 2010 2	Negeri Sembilan FA	3 - 3	Felda United F.C.	Paroi
20:45	Goal		Goal	Stadium: Tuanku Abdul Rahman Stadium

23 August 2010 3	Negeri Sembilan FA	1 - 2	ATM FA	Paroi
20:45	Goal		Goal	Stadium: Tuanku Abdul Rahman Stadium

27 August 2010 4	Negeri Sembilan FA	1 - 1	Johor FC	Paroi
20:45	Goal		Goal	Stadium: Tuanku Abdul Rahman Stadium

4 September 2010 5	Negeri Sembilan FA	1 - 0	Kuala Lumpur FA	Paroi
20:45	Goal			Stadium: Tuanku Abdul Rahman Stadium

== Competitions ==
Win Draw Loss

=== Malaysia Super League ===
9 January 2010 1/Charity Shield	Negeri Sembilan FA	1 – 2	Selangor FA	Paroi
20:45	Rezal Zambery Yahya 27'		76' Safee Sali; 83' R. Surendran	Stadium: Tuanku Abdul Rahman Stadium

13 January 2010 2	Johor FA	1 – 1	Negeri Sembilan FA	Pasir Gudang
20:45	Wan Rohaimi Wan Ismail 75'		83' Mohd Norizam Salaman	Stadium: Pasir Gudang Corporation Stadium

16 January 2010 3	Kuala Lumpur FA	0 – 0	Negeri Sembilan FA	Cheras
20:45				Stadium: KLFA Stadium

19 January 2010 4	Negeri Sembilan FA	2 – 1	PLUS F.C.	Paroi
20:45	Mohd Firdaus Azizul 83', 90'		71' Mohd Nizaruddin Yusof	Stadium: Tuanku Abdul Rahman Stadium

26 January 2010 5	Negeri Sembilan FA	2 – 1	Terengganu FA	Paroi
20:45	Idris Abdul Karim 72'; Joseph Kalang Tie 89' (O.G.)		9' Joseph Kalang Tie	Stadium: Tuanku Abdul Rahman Stadium

9 February 2010 6	Pahang FA	2 – 1	Negeri Sembilan FA	Kuantan
20:45	Abdul Rahman Abdul Kadir 37'; Fazli Baharuddin 89'		65' K. Thanaraj	Stadium: Darulmakmur Stadium

6 March 2010 7	Negeri Sembilan FA	3 – 2	Perlis FA	Paroi
20:45	Idris Abdul Karim 26'; Shukor Adan 43'; Mohd Asyraff Al-Japri 55'		38' Wan Khairul Faiz Kamaruddin; 50' K. Soley	Stadium: Tuanku Abdul Rahman Stadium

13 March 2010 8	Kedah FA	0 – 1	Negeri Sembilan FA	Alor Setar
20:45			90' Mohd Norizam Salaman	Stadium: Darul Aman Stadium

16 March 2010 9	Johor FC	0 – 2	Negeri Sembilan FA	Johor Bahru
20:45			55' Mohd Zaquan Adha Abdul Radzak; 56' Mohd Shaffik Abdul Rahman	Stadium: Tan Sri Dato Haji Hassan Yunos Stadium

17 April 2010 10	Negeri Sembilan FA	1 – 3	Kelantan FA	Paroi
20:45	Shukor Adan 76'		29' Indra Putra Mahayuddin; 55' Mohd Daudsu Jamaluddin; 79' Mohd Badhri Mohd Radzi	Stadium: Tuanku Abdul Rahman Stadium

20 April 2010 11	Perak FA	2 – 1	Negeri Sembilan FA	Ipoh
20:45	Shafuan Adli Shaari 10', 73'		52' Shahurain Abu Samah	Stadium: Perak Stadium

23 April 2010 12	Negeri Sembilan FA	4 – 0	Penang FA	Paroi
20:45	Idris Abdul Karim 64'; Mohd Zaquan Adha Abdul Radzak 70', 83'; Shahurain Abu Samah 82'			Stadium: Tuanku Abdul Rahman Stadium

4 May 2010 13	T-Team F.C.	2 – 1	Negeri Sembilan FA	Ipoh
20:45	Abdul Hadi Yahya 27'; Haris Safwan Kamal 45'		17' Mohd Aidil Zafuan Abdul Radzak	Stadium: Sultan Ismail Nasiruddin Shah Stadium

8 May 2010 14	Negeri Sembilan FA	0 - 1	T–Team F.C.	Paroi
20:45			90' Abdul Hadi Yahya	Stadium: Tuanku Abdul Rahman Stadium

15 May 2010 15	Selangor FA	4 - 2	Negeri Sembilan FA	Shah Alam
20:45	Amirul Hadi Zainal 41', 66'; Hardi Jaafar 64'; Mohd Bunyamin Umar 75'		29' Idris Abdul Karim; 32' Mohd Norizam Salaman	Stadium: Shah Alam Stadium

18 May 2010 16	Negeri Sembilan FA	2 - 1	Johor FC	Paroi
20:45	Shahurain Abu Samah 4', 21'		62' Mohd Ezaidy Khadar	Stadium: Tuanku Abdul Rahman Stadium

22 May 2010 17	Negeri Sembilan FA	1 – 2	Kuala Lumpur FA	Paroi
20:45	Shukor Adan 40'		16' Azidan Sarudin; 58' Farouk Hashim	Stadium: Tuanku Abdul Rahman Stadium

25 May 2010 18	PLUS F.C.	1 – 1	Negeri Sembilan FA	Petaling Jaya
20:45	Mohd Fadzli Saari 64'		80' Mohd Zaquan Adha Abdul Radzak	Stadium: Petaling Jaya Stadium

29 May 2010 19	Negeri Sembilan FA	3 - 1	Johor FA	Paroi
20:45	Abdul Halim Zainal 3'; Mohd Zaquan Adha Abdul Radzak 65', 78'		77' L. Rajesh	Stadium: Tuanku Abdul Rahman Stadium

1 June 2010 20	Terengganu FA	1 - 1	Negeri Sembilan FA	Kuala Terengganu
20:45	Ronny Harun 3'		52' Abdul Halim Zainal	Stadium: Sultan Ismail Nasiruddin Shah Stadium

6 July 2010 21	Kelantan FA	1 – 0	Negeri Sembilan FA	Kota Bharu
20:45	Akmal Rizal Ahmad Rakhli 65'			Stadium: Sultan Mohammad IV Stadium

10 July 2010 22	Negeri Sembilan FA	2 – 1	Kedah FA	Paroi
20:45	Mohd Norizam Salaman 24', 52'		70' Baddrol Bakhtiar	Stadium: Tuanku Abdul Rahman Stadium

17 July 2010 23	Negeri Sembilan FA	0 – 0	Perak FA	Paroi
20:45				Stadium: Tuanku Abdul Rahman Stadium

28 July 2010 24	Penang FA	0 – 3	Negeri Sembilan FA	Batu Kawan
20:45			Mohd Zaquan Adha Abdul Radzak; Mohd Norizam Salaman; Rezal Zambery Yahya	Stadium: Penang State Stadium

31 July 2010 25	Negeri Sembilan FA	5 – 0	Pahang FA	Paroi
20:45	Idris Abdul Karim 6', 41'; Shukor Adan 76'; Rezal Zambery Yahya 86'; Mohd Zaquan Adha Abdul Radzak 90'			Stadium: Tuanku Abdul Rahman Stadium

3 August 2010 26	Perlis FA	2 – 0	Negeri Sembilan FA	Kangar
20:45	Ahmad Aminuddin Shaharudin 31'; Mohd Azrul Ahmad 49' (pen.)			Stadium: Utama Negeri Stadium

=== Malaysia FA Cup ===
2 February 2010 R1(1)	Johor FC	2 – 2	Negeri Sembilan FA	Pasir Gudang
20:45	Mohd Nurul Azwan Roya 6'; Eddy Helmi Abdul Manan 67' (pen.)		15' Shukor Adan; 75' Mohd Zaquan Adha Abdul Radzak	Stadium: Pasir Gudang Corporation Stadium

6 February 2010 R1(2)	Negeri Sembilan FA	5 – 3	Johor FC	Paroi
20:45	Mohd Zaquan Adha Abdul Radzak 51'; S. Kunanlan 54'; K. Thanaraj 60'; Mohd Asyraff Al-Japri 79', 90'		66', 74', 80' Eddy Helmi Abdul Manan	Stadium: Tuanku Abdul Rahman Stadium

16 February 2010 R2(1)	PDRM FA	2 – 3	Negeri Sembilan FA	Paroi
20:45	Eddy Gapil 30'; S. Harivarman 82'		25', 74' Mohd Zaquan Adha Abdul Radzak; 70' S. Kunanlan	Stadium: Tuanku Abdul Rahman Stadium

20 February 2010 R2(2)	Negeri Sembilan FA	5 – 0	PDRM FA	Paroi
20:45	Mohd Zaquan Adha Abdul Radzak 9'; Shahurain Abu Samah 26'; Rezal Zambery Yahya 45'; Mohd Firdaus Azizul 55'; Mohd Alif Shamsudin 71'			Stadium: Tuanku Abdul Rahman Stadium

9 March 2010 QF1	PLUS F.C.	1 – 0	Negeri Sembilan FA	Petaling Jaya
20:45	Mohd Nizaruddin Yusof 87'			Stadium: Petaling Jaya Stadium

20 March 2010 QF2	Negeri Sembilan FA	3 – 1	PLUS F.C.	Paroi
20:45	Idris Abdul Karim 67'; Mohd Shaffik Abdul Rahman 75'; Shukor Adan 81'		68' Mohd Fadzli Saari	Stadium: Tuanku Abdul Rahman Stadium

30 March 2010 SF1	Selangor FA	1 – 2	Negeri Sembilan FA	Shah Alam
20:45	Safee Sali 45'		70' Mohd Zaquan Adha Abdul Radzak; 72' S. Kunanlan	Stadium: Shah Alam Stadium

3 April 2010 SF2	Negeri Sembilan FA	0 – 1	Selangor FA	Paroi
20:45			56' (O.G.) Mohd Alif Shamsudin	Stadium: Tuanku Abdul Rahman Stadium

10 April 2010 Final	Negeri Sembilan FA	1 – 1 (a.e.t.) (5 - 4 p)	Kedah FA	Bukit Jalil
20:45	Mohd Shaffik Abdul Rahman 39'		35' Baddrol Bakhtiar	Stadium: Bukit Jalil National Stadium

=== Malaysia Cup ===
14 September 2010 GS1	Kelantan FA	0 - 1	Negeri Sembilan FA	Kota Bharu
20:45			73' (pen.) Abdul Halim Zainal	Stadium: Sultan Mohammad IV Stadium

17 September 2010 GS2	Negeri Sembilan FA	1 - 1	PLUS F.C.	Paroi
20:45	Rezal Zambery Yahya		36' Irwan Fadzli Idrus	Stadium: Tuanku Abdul Rahman Stadium

20 September 2010 GS3	PKNS F.C.	1 - 2	Negeri Sembilan FA	Petaling Jaya
20:45	Mohammad Zamri Hassan 3'		32' Idris Abdul Karim; 45' Abdul Halim Zainal	Stadium: Petaling Jaya Stadium

3 October 2010 GS4	Negeri Sembilan FA	2 - 2	Kelantan FA	Paroi
20:45	Shahurain Abu Samah 25'; Abdul Halim Zainal 62' (pen.)		67' Zairul Fitree Ishak; 69' Akmal Rizal Ahmad Rakhli	Stadium: Tuanku Abdul Rahman Stadium

6 October 2010 GS5	PLUS F.C.	1 - 2	Negeri Sembilan FA	Petaling Jaya
20:45	Mohd Badrul Hisani Abd Rahman 36'		66' Shukor Adan; 72' Mohd Shaffik Abdul Rahman	Stadium: Petaling Jaya Stadium

9 October 2010 GS6	Negeri Sembilan FA	3 - 1	PKNS F.C.	Paroi
20:45	Ching Hong Aik 41'; Shukor Adan 81'; Mohd Asyraff Al-Japri 90'		34' Mohd Khairul Ahyar	Stadium: Tuanku Abdul Rahman Stadium

12 October 2010 QF1	Negeri Sembilan FA	1 - 0	Perlis FA	Paroi
20:45	Shahurain Abu Samah 51'			Stadium: Tuanku Abdul Rahman Stadium

16 October 2010 QF2	Perlis FA	1 - 3	Negeri Sembilan FA	Kangar
20:45	Mohd Azrul Ahmad 89' (pen.)		23', 30' Abdul Halim Zainal; 74' Shukor Adan	Stadium: Utama Negeri Stadium

20 October 2010 SF1	Negeri Sembilan FA	0 - 1	Johor FC	Paroi
20:45			89' Mohd Ezaidy Khadar	Stadium: Tuanku Abdul Rahman Stadium

23 October 2010 SF2	Johor FC	0 - 2	Negeri Sembilan FA	Pasir Gudang
20:45			36' Shukor Adan; 60' (pen.) Shahurain Abu Samah	Stadium: Pasir Gudang Corporation Stadium

30 October 2010 Final	Kelantan FA	2 - 1	Negeri Sembilan FA	Bukit Jalil
20:45	Hairuddin Omar 57'; Mohd Badhri Mohd Radzi 65'		13' (pen.) Shahurain Abu Samah	Stadium: Bukit Jalil National Stadium

== Season statistics ==
=== League table ===
Pos	Team	Pld	W	D	L	GF	GA	GD	Pts
4	Johor FC	26	13	4	9	44	29	+15	43
5	Kedah	26	10	8	8	34	23	+11	38
6	Negeri Sembilan	26	11	5	10	40	31	+9	38
7	T–Team	26	10	8	8	33	26	+7	38
8	Pahang	26	10	3	13	31	50	−19	33

Source: Results TM Liga Super
Rules for classification: 1) points; 2) goal difference; 3) number of goals scored.

=== Top scorers ===
Rnk	Pos	No.	Player	Super League	FA Cup	Malaysia Cup	Total
1	FW	8	(Malaysia) Mohd Zaquan Adha Abdul Radzak	8	6	0	14
2	MF	12	(Malaysia) Shukor Adan	4	2	4	10
3	MF	9	(Malaysia) Shahurain Abu Samah	4	1	4	9
4	MF	17	(Malaysia) Idris Abdul Karim	6	1	1	8
5	MF	20	(Malaysia) Abdul Halim Zainal	2	0	5	7
6	FW	18	(Malaysia) Mohd Norizam Salaman	6	0	0	6
7	MF	23	(Malaysia) Rezal Zambery Yahya	3	1	1	5
8	MF	28	(Malaysia) Mohd Asyraff Al-Japri	1	2	1	4
9	MF	10	(Malaysia) Mohd Shaffik Abdul Rahman	1	2	1	4
10	FW	19	(Malaysia) Mohd Firdaus Azizul	2	1	0	3
11	MF	6	(Malaysia) S. Kunanlan	0	3	0	3
12	MF	14	(Malaysia) K. Thanaraj	1	1	0	2
13	DF	7	(Malaysia) Mohd Aidil Zafuan Abdul Radzak	1	0	0	1
14	DF	24	(Malaysia) Mohd Alif Shamsudin	0	1	0	1
15	DF	15	(Malaysia) Ching Hong Aik	0	0	1	1
Own goals				1	0	0	1
TOTALS				40	21	18	79
