= 2012 Malaysia Cup knockout stage =

Knockout stage of Malaysia Cup 2012

The 2012 Malaysia Cup knockout stage will be played from 25 September to 20 October 2012, with the top two teams from every four groups from the group stage advancing to the knockout stage beginning with the quarter-finals followed by the semi-finals and the final. This stage will be played in two legs except for the finals which is played once.

== Schedule ==
The draw for the group stage was held at Dewan Merak Kayangan, Jalan Semarak, Kuala Lumpur on 2 August 2012 at 17:00 MYT (UTC+8). A draw was made to determine where the teams play while the format of the knockout round remained unchanged.

Round	First leg	Second leg
Quarter-finals	25, 28 & 29 September 2012	2 October 2012
Semi-finals	5 & 6 October 2012	11 & 12 October 2012
Final	20 October 2012	

== Format ==
The knockout phase involves the eight teams which qualified as the winners or runners-up of each of the four groups in the group stage.

Each tie in the knockout phase was played over two legs, apart from the final, with each team playing one leg at home. The team that scored more goals on aggregate over the two legs advanced to the next round. If the aggregate score was level, the away goals rule was applied, i.e. the team that scored more goals away from home over the two legs advanced. If away goals were also equal, then thirty minutes of extra time was played. The away goals rule was again applied after extra time, i.e. if there were goals scored during extra time and the aggregate score was still level, the visiting team advanced by virtue of more away goals scored. If no goals were scored during extra time, the tie was decided by penalty shoot-out. In the final, which was played as a single match, if scores were level at the end of normal time, extra time was played, followed by a penalty shoot-out if scores remained tied.

The mechanism of the draws for each round was as follows:

- In the draw for the quarter-final, the four group winners were seeded, and the four group runners-up were unseeded. The seeded teams were drawn against the unseeded teams, with the seeded teams hosting the second leg. Teams from the same group or the same association could not be drawn against each other.
- In the draws for the quarter-finals onwards, there were no seedings, and teams from the same group or the same association could be drawn against each other.

== Qualified teams ==
Group	Winners	Runners-up
A	(Singapore) LionsXII	Johor FC
B	Kelantan	ATM
C	Negeri Sembilan	FELDA United
D	Selangor	Pahang

== Bracket ==
Quarter-finals
D2	Pahang	2	0	2
A1	(Singapore) LionsXII	1	2	3
B2	ATM	3	3	6
C1	Negeri Sembilan	2	1	3
C2	FELDA United	1	2	3
B1	Kelantan	2	2	4
A2	Johor FC	1	1	2
D1	Selangor	3	2	5

Semi-finals
(Singapore) LionsXII	1	1	2 (4)
ATM (p)	1	1	2 (5)
Kelantan	1	2	3
Selangor	0	0	0

Final
ATM	2
Kelantan	3

== Quarter-finals ==
The first legs were played on 25, 28 and 29 September, and the second legs were played on 2 October 2012.

Team 1	Agg.	Team 2	1st leg	2nd leg
Johor FC	2–5	Selangor	1–3	1–2
Pahang	2–3	(Singapore) LionsXII	2–1	0–2
ATM	6–3	Negeri Sembilan	3–2	3–1
FELDA United	3–4	Kelantan	1–2	2–2

=== Matches ===
25 September 2012
20:45 UTC+8

Johor FC	1–3	Selangor
Akmal 53'		Safiq 11'; Bunyamin 21'; Amri 24'

Pasir Gudang Corporation Stadium, Pasir Gudang
2 October 2012
20:45 UTC+8

Selangor	2–1	Johor FC
Veenod 28'; Fitri 82'		Fernando 64'

Shah Alam Stadium, Shah Alam

Selangor won 5–2 on aggregate.

25 September 2012
20:45 UTC+8

Pahang	2–1	(Singapore) LionsXII
Fauzi 9'; Hafiz 75'		Jalaluddin 20' (o.g.)

Darulmakmur Stadium, Kuantan
Attendance: 25,000
2 October 2012
20:45 UTC+8

LionsXII (Singapore)	2–0	Pahang
Shahril 35', 79'

Jalan Besar Stadium, Kallang
Attendance: 7,500
Referee: Teoh Hee Loon

LionsXII won 3–2 on aggregate.

28 September 2012
20:45 UTC+8

ATM	3–2	Negeri Sembilan
Jayaseelan 56'; Martelotto 61'; Hairuddin 80'		Firdaus 74'; Shakir 89'

Selayang Municipal Council Stadium, Selayang
2 October 2012
20:45 UTC+8

Negeri Sembilan	1–3	ATM
Alif 5'		Aidil 9'; Marlon 42', 58'

Tuanku Abdul Rahman Stadium, Paroi
Referee: Zamzaidi Katimin

ATM won 6–3 on aggregate.

29 September 2012
20:45 UTC+8

FELDA United	1–2	Kelantan
Khairan 79'		Azwan 56'; Indra 75'

Hang Jebat Stadium, Krubong
Referee: Amirul Izwan Yaacob
2 October 2012
20:45 UTC+8

Kelantan	2–2	FELDA United
Farhan 71'; Ghaddar 90+3'		Antoine-Curier 43'; Mafry 55' (o.g.)

Sultan Muhammad IV Stadium, Kota Bharu
Referee: Jefferi Zolkifli

Kelantan won 4–3 on aggregate.

== Semi-finals ==
The first legs were played on 5 & 6 October, and the second legs were played on 11 & 12 October 2012.

Team 1	Agg.	Team 2	1st leg	2nd leg
LionsXII (Singapore)	2–2 (4–5 p)	ATM	1–1	1–1 (a.e.t.)
Kelantan	3–0	Selangor	1–0	2–0

=== First leg ===
5 October 2012
20:45 UTC+8

LionsXII (Singapore)	1–1	ATM
Safuwan 81'		Marlon 55'

Jalan Besar Stadium, Kallang
Attendance: 7,479
Referee: Suhaizi Shukri
11 October 2012
20:45 UTC+8

ATM	1–1 (a.e.t.)	(Singapore) LionsXII
Marlon 90+7'		Casmir 27'
Penalties
Marlon (penalty scored); Aidil (penalty missed); Rezal (penalty scored); Reuben (penalty scored); Martelotto (penalty scored); Varanthan (penalty missed); Fitri (penalty scored)	5–4	(penalty scored) Khairul; (penalty scored) Shahdan; (penalty scored) Hariss; (penalty missed) Shaiful; (penalty scored) Izwan; (penalty missed) Baihakki; (penalty missed) Yasir

Selayang Municipal Council Stadium, Selayang
Referee: Samsudin Ibrahim

2–2 on aggregate. ATM won 5–4 on penalties.

6 October 2012
20:45 UTC+8

Kelantan	1–0	Selangor
Farhan 62'

Sultan Muhammad IV Stadium, Kota Bharu
Attendance: 25,000
Referee: Yusof Mat Karim
12 October 2012
20:45 UTC+8

Selangor	0–2	Kelantan
		Ghaddar 85'; Badhri 90+3'

Shah Alam Stadium, Shah Alam
Referee: Amirul Izwan Yaacob

Kelantan won 3–0 on aggregate.

== Final ==
The final will be played at the Shah Alam Stadium in Shah Alam, Malaysia on 20 October 2012.

20 October 2012
20:45 UTC+8

ATM	2–3 (a.e.t.)	Kelantan
Rezal 49'; Marlon 62'	Report	Norshahrul 44', 50'; Indra 96'

Shah Alam Stadium, Shah Alam
Attendance: 80,952
Referee: Nafeez Abd Wahab
