= Farizal Marlias =

Malaysian footballer (born 1986)

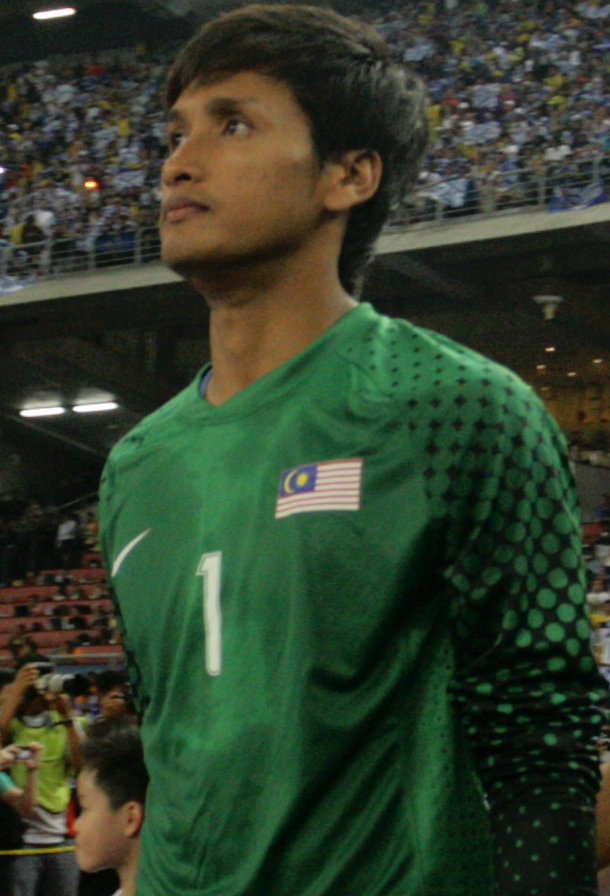
- Farizal playing for Malaysia in 2011

Personal information
- Full name: Mohd Farizal Bin Marlias
- Date of birth: 29 June 1986 (age 40)
- Place of birth: Maran, Pahang, Malaysia
- Height: 1.78 m (5 ft 10 in)
- Position: Goalkeeper

Youth career
- 2003–2005: Sri Pahang

Senior career*
Years	Team	Apps	(Gls)
2006–2008	Shahzan Muda		
2008–2010	Perlis		
2011–2012	Negeri Sembilan	33	(0)
2013	Perak	19	(0)
2014	Selangor	22	(0)
2015–2025	Johor Darul Ta'zim	130	(0)

International career^{‡}
2007–2009	Malaysia U23	11	(0)
2009–2022	Malaysia	54	(0)
Medal record
Men's football
Representing Malaysia
SEA Games
Gold medal – first place	2009
AFF Championship
Runner-up	2014
Runner-up	2018
Third place	2012
- * Club domestic league appearances and goals as of 16 December 2023 ‡ National team caps and goals as of 11 June 2022

Mohd Farizal bin Marlias (born 29 June 1986) is a Malaysian retired professional footballer who plays as a goalkeeper.

Farizal, alongside former teammate, Aidil Zafuan, currently holds the record for the most Malaysia Super League with 10 titles.

== Club career ==
Farizal started his professional career with Shahzan Muda. He spent two seasons playing in the Premier League Malaysia. He transferred to Perlis and wore the number one jersey for two seasons.

In 2011, he joined Negeri Sembilan. Initially he became second-choice goalkeeper to Mohd Farizal Harun, but he gradually becomes the number one goalkeeper after recovering from injury and subsequently helped his team win the 2011 Malaysia Cup.

He joined Perak at the end of 2012 and played 19 league matches and 5 Malaysia Cup matches in 2013. At the end of the season he left Perak and joined Selangor.

In 2015 season he joins Johor Darul Ta'zim (JDT) and is selected as the first choice goalkeeper. He made his 200th appearance in all competitions for JDT in a 2022 Malaysia Super League match against Sarawak United. He was made captain of the club in 2020.

== International career ==
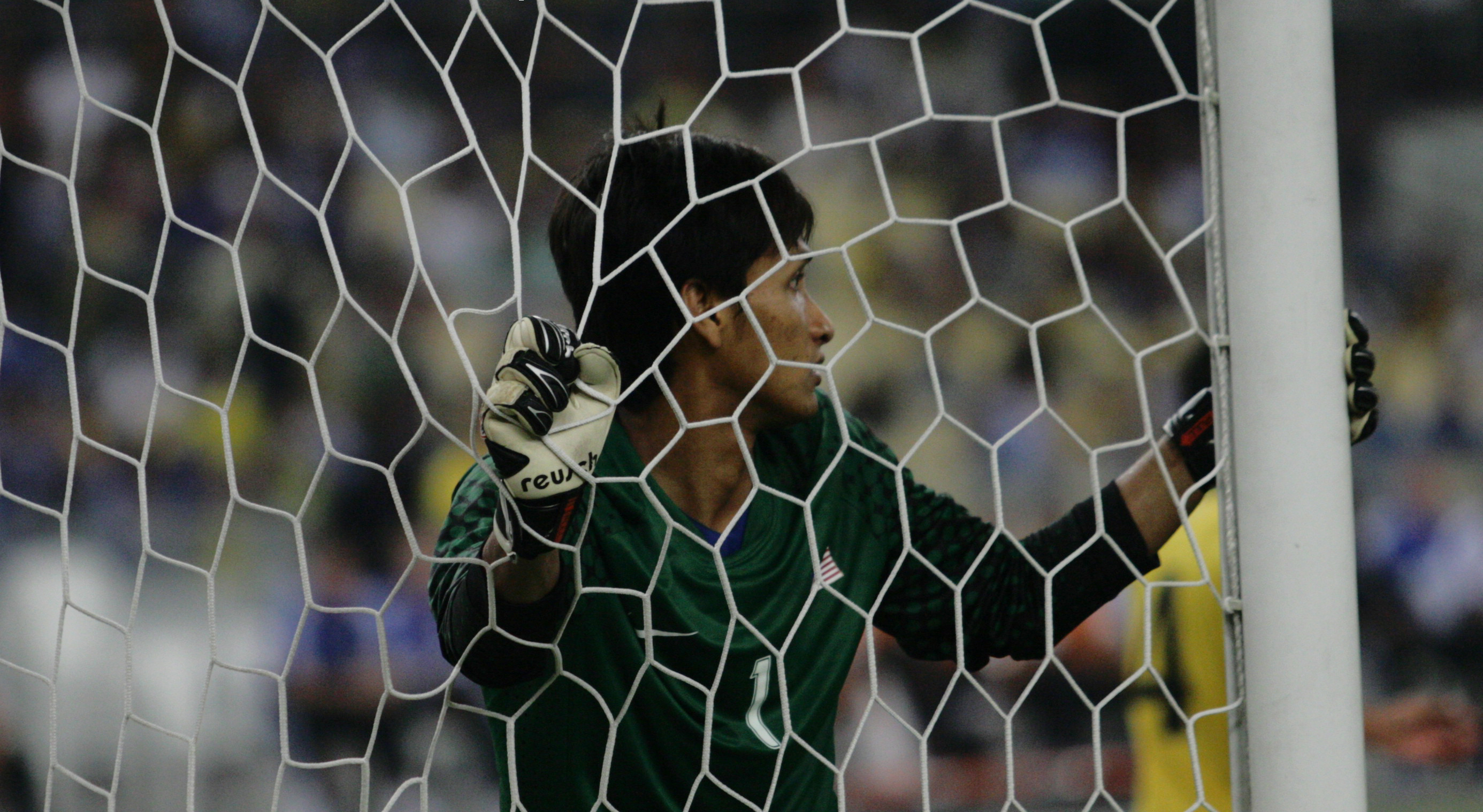
Farizal in Malaysia vs Chelsea

Farizal was selected as the third choice goalkeeper for the 2008 AFF Suzuki Cup after Badrulzaman Abdul Halim was dropped because of injury.

On 12 July 2009, Farizal earned his first senior international appearance in an unofficial matches against Zimbabwe. He later made his full international debut against Kenya.

He also featured with Malaysia Selection in the exhibition match against Manchester United in which he conceded three goals in the first game and two goals in the second game. In the first game, he assisted Mohd Amri Yahyah who scored a beautiful volley outside the penalty box.

In 2010, Malaysian coach K. Rajagobal called up Farizal for the 2010 AFF Suzuki Cup, but he was later ruled out by injury during a league match with Perlis. He was later replaced by Mohd Sharbinee Allawee Ramli.

In 2011, Farizal made his international comeback when he came on as a substitute against Hong Kong in February. In July, he was selected to play for Malaysia Selection in a match against Chelsea. He keep a clean sheet for the Malaysian side before being replaced by Harimau Muda A keeper Mohd Izham Tarmizi in the 75th minute.

== Career statistics ==
=== Club ===
As of match played 16 December 2023

Appearances and goals by club, season and competition
Club	Season	League			Cup (Note: Includes Malaysia FA Cup)		League Cup (Note: Includes Malaysia Cup)		Continental (Note: Includes AFC Champions League and AFC Cup)		Total	
Club	Season	Division	Apps	Goals	Apps	Goals	Apps	Goals	Apps	Goals	Apps	Goals
Shahzan Muda	2006	Malaysia Premier League		0		0		0	–			0
Shahzan Muda	2007	Malaysia Premier League		0		0		0	–			0
Shahzan Muda	2008	Malaysia Premier League		0		0		0	–			0
Shahzan Muda	Total			0		0		0	–			0
Perlis	2009	Malaysia Super League		0		0		0	–			0
Perlis	2010	Malaysia Super League		0		0		0	–			0
Perlis	Total			0		0		0	–			0
Negeri Sembilan	2011	Malaysia Super League	14	0	1	0	7	0	–		22	0
Negeri Sembilan	2012	Malaysia Super League	19	0	1	0	7	0	–		27	0
Negeri Sembilan	Total		33	0	2	0	14	0	–		49	0
Perak	2013	Malaysia Super League	19	0	0	0	5	0	–		24	0
Perak	Total		19	0	0	0	5	0	–		24	0
Selangor	2014	Malaysia Super League	22	0	1	0	6	0	4	0	33	0
Selangor	Total		22	0	1	0	6	0	4	0	33	0
Johor Darul Ta'zim	2015	Malaysia Super League	18	0	1	0	6	0	7	0	32	0
Johor Darul Ta'zim	2016	Malaysia Super League	12	0	4	0	5	0	3	0	24	0
Johor Darul Ta'zim	2017	Malaysia Super League	8	0	0	0	0	0	5	0	13	0
Johor Darul Ta'zim	2018	Malaysia Super League	18	0	3	0	9	0	3	0	33	0
Johor Darul Ta'zim	2019	Malaysia Super League	20	0	0	0	8	0	3	0	31	0
Johor Darul Ta'zim	2020	Malaysia Super League	11	0	–		0	0	2	0	13	0
Johor Darul Ta'zim	2021	Malaysia Super League	21	0	–		8	0	5	0	34	0
Johor Darul Ta'zim	2022	Malaysia Super League	20	0	3	0	0	0	5	0	28	0
Johor Darul Ta'zim	2023	Malaysia Super League	2	0	0	0	0	0	0	0	2	0
Johor Darul Ta'zim	Total		130	0	11	0	36	0	33	0	210	0

=== International ===
As of match played 11 June 2022

Appearances and goals by national
Malaysia
Year	Apps	Goals
2009	7	0
2010	2	0
2011	3	0
2012	15	0
2014	5	0
2015	3	0
2018	6	0
2019	8	0
2021	3	0
2022	5	0
Total	54	0

International appearances and clean sheet
#	Date	Venue	Opponent	Result	Clean Sheet	Competition
2009
1.	12 August	Shah Alam, Malaysia	Kenya	0–0 (D)	1	Friendly
2.	15 August	Shah Alam, Malaysia	China	0–0 (D)	2	Friendly
3.	30 August	Riyadh, Saudi Arabia	Saudi Arabia	2–1 (L)		Friendly
4.	5 September	Amman, Jordan	Jordan	0–0 (D)	3	Friendly
5.	11 September	Petaling Jaya, Malaysia	Lesotho	5–0 (W)	4	Friendly
6.	14 November	Tashkent, Uzbekistan	Uzbekistan	3–1 (L)		2011 AFC Asian Cup qualification
7.	18 November	Bukit Jalil, Malaysia	Uzbekistan	1–3 (L)		2011 AFC Asian Cup qualification
2010
8.	6 January	Dubai, UAE	United Arab Emirates	1–0 (L)		2011 AFC Asian Cup qualification
9.	27 February	Bukit Jalil, Malaysia	Yemen	1–0 (W)	5	Friendly
2011
10.	9 February	Shah Alam, Malaysia	Hong Kong	2–0 (W)	6	Friendly
11.	7 October	Canberra, Australia	Australia	5–0 (L)		Friendly
12.	13 November	Guwahati, India	India	1–1 (D)		Friendly
2012
13.	29 February	Manila, Philippines	Philippines	1–1 (D)		Friendly
14.	28 April	Shah Alam, Malaysia	Sri Lanka	6–0 (W)	7	Friendly
15.	1 June	Shah Alam, Malaysia	Philippines	0–0 (D)	8	Friendly
16.	11 September	Shah Alam, Malaysia	Vietnam	0–2 (L)		Friendly
17.	16 October	Mong Kok, Hong Kong	Hong Kong	0–3 (W)	9	Friendly
18.	7 November	Muang Thong Thani, Thailand	Thailand	2–0 (L)		Friendly
19.	20 November	Bukit Jalil, Malaysia	Bangladesh	1–1 (D)		Friendly
20.	28 November	Bukit Jalil, Malaysia	Laos	4–1 (W)		2012 AFF Suzuki Cup
21.	1 December	Bukit Jalil, Malaysia	Indonesia	2–0 (W)	10	2012 AFF Suzuki Cup
22.	9 December	Bukit Jalil, Malaysia	Thailand	1–1 (D)		2012 AFF Suzuki Cup
23.	13 December	Bangkok, Thailand	Thailand	0–2 (L)		2012 AFF Suzuki Cup
2013
24.	10 September	Tianjin Olympic Center Stadium, China	China	2–0 (L)		Friendly
2014
25.	8 August	Dushanbe, Tajikistan	Tajikistan	4–1 (L)		Friendly
26.	12 November	Shah Alam, Malaysia	Syria	0–3 (L)		Friendly
27.	11 December	Mỹ Đình National Stadium, Vietnam	Vietnam	2–4 (W)		2014 AFF Suzuki Cup
28.	17 December	Rajamangala Stadium, Thailand	Thailand	0–2 (L)		2014 AFF Suzuki Cup
29.	20 December	Bukit Jalil Stadium, Malaysia	Thailand	3–2 (W)		2014 AFF Suzuki Cup
30.	26 March	Seeb Stadium, Oman	Oman	0-6 (L)		Friendly
31.	6 June	Shah Alam, Malaysia	Hong Kong	0–3 (W)	11	Friendly
32.	16 June	Bukit Jalil Stadium, Malaysia	Palestine	0-6 (L)		2018 FIFA World Cup qualification (AFC)
2018
33.	7 September	Taiwan	Chinese Taipei	2–0 (L)		Friendly
34.	24 November	Bukit Jalil, Malaysia	Myanmar	3–0 (W)	12	2018 AFF Suzuki Cup
35.	1 December	Bukit Jalil, Malaysia	Thailand	0–0 (D)	13	2018 AFF Suzuki Cup
36.	5 December	Bangkok, Thailand	Thailand	2–2 (D)		2018 AFF Suzuki Cup
37.	11 December	Bukit Jalil, Malaysia	Vietnam	2–2 (D)		2018 AFF Suzuki Cup
38.	15 December	Hanoi, Vietnam	Vietnam	1–0 (L)		2018 AFF Suzuki Cup
2019
39.	2 June	Bukit Jalil, Malaysia	Nepal	2–0 (W)	14	Friendly
40.	7 June	Bukit Jalil, Malaysia	Timor-Leste	7–1 (W)		2022 FIFA World Cup qualification (AFC)
41.	30 August	Bukit Jalil, Malaysia	Jordan	0–1 (L)		Friendly
42.	5 September	Jakarta, Indonesia	Indonesia	2–3 (W)		2022 FIFA World Cup qualification (AFC)
43.	10 September	Bukit Jalil, Malaysia	United Arab Emirates	1–2 (L)		2022 FIFA World Cup qualification (AFC)
44.	5 October	Bukit Jalil, Malaysia	Sri Lanka	6–0 (W)	15	Friendly
45.	10 October	Hanoi, Vietnam	Vietnam	1–0 (L)		2022 FIFA World Cup qualification (AFC)
46.	19 October	Bukit Jalil, Malaysia	Indonesia	2–0 (W)	16	2022 FIFA World Cup qualification (AFC)
2021
47.	19 October	Riffa, Bahrain	Bahrain	2–0 (L)		Friendly
48.	3 June	Dubai, UAE	United Arab Emirates	4–0 (L)		2022 FIFA World Cup qualification (AFC)
49.	11 June	Dubai, UAE	Vietnam	1–2 (L)		2022 FIFA World Cup qualification (AFC)
2022
50.	23 March	Singapore	Philippines	2–0 (W)	17	Friendly
51.	26 March	Singapore	Singapore	2–1 (L)		Friendly
52.	1 June	Bukit Jalil, Malaysia	Hong Kong	2–0 (W)	18	Friendly
53.	8 June	Bukit Jalil, Malaysia	Turkmenistan	3–1 (W)		2023 AFC Asian Cup qualification
53.	11 June	Bukit Jalil, Malaysia	Bahrain	1–2 (L)		2023 AFC Asian Cup qualification

== Honours ==
=== Club ===
Negeri Sembilan

- Malaysia Cup: 2011
- Malaysia Charity Shield: 2012

Johor Darul Ta'zim

- Malaysia Super League: 2015, 2016, 2017, 2018, 2019, 2020, 2021, 2022, 2023, 2024–25
- Malaysia Cup: 2017, 2019, 2022, 2023, 2024–25
- Piala Sumbangsih: 2015, 2016, 2019, 2020, 2021, 2022, 2023, 2024
- Malaysia FA Cup: 2016, 2022, 2023, 2024
- AFC Cup: 2015

=== International ===
Malaysia

- SEA Games: (gold) gold : 2009
- ASEAN Championship runner-up: 2014, 2018

=== Individual ===
- FAM Football Awards – Best Goalkeeper: 2009, 2015, 2018, 2019, 2020, 2021
