= Norismaidham Ismail =

Malaysian footballer

Personal information
- Full name: Norismaidham bin Ismail
- Date of birth: 30 June 1984 (age 42)
- Place of birth: Kuala Lumpur, Malaysia
- Position: Midfielder

Team information
- Current team: AirAsia F.C.

Senior career*
Years	Team	Apps	(Gls)
2011	Kuala Lumpur FA	21	(0)
2012–2013	Negeri Sembilan FA	13	(0)
2014	Perlis FA	?	(?)
2015	AirAsia F.C.	0	(0)
- * Club domestic league appearances and goals as of 28 February 2013 ‡ National team caps and goals as of 28 February 2013

Norismaidham bin Ismail (born 30 June 1984) is a Malaysian footballer currently playing in the Malaysia FAM League for AirAsia F.C.
