= Tengku Qayyum =

Malaysian footballer

Personal information
- Full name: Tengku Qayyum Ubaidillah Bin Tengku Ahmad
- Date of birth: 5 March 1986 (age 40)
- Place of birth: Seremban, Negeri Sembilan, Malaysia
- Height: 1.68 m (5 ft 6 in)
- Position: Left back

Team information
- Current team: PUSEN-Seremban United (assistant)

Youth career
- 2005–2006: Negeri Sembilan President's

Senior career*
Years	Team	Apps	(Gls)
2007–2014	Negeri Sembilan	120	(2)
2015–2017	Sime Darby	44	(1)
2018	Kelantan		
2019–2024	KSR Sains		

International career
2004	Malaysia U20		
- * Club domestic league appearances and goals

Tengku Qayyum Ubaidillah Bin Tengku Ahmad (born 5 March 1986) is a Malaysian former professional footballer who played as a left back.

Qayyum began his professional career with Negeri Sembilan youth team. He was promoted to first team in 2007. Qayyum was a member of the Malaysia U20 at the 2004 AFC Youth Championship.

== Club career ==
=== Sime Darby ===
On 18 December 2014, it was announced that Qayyum signed a contract for the 2015 season. On 7 February 2015, Qayyum made his league debut for Sime Darby in a 2–0 defeat to Perak at Perak Stadium, Ipoh. Qayyum captained the club to win the 2017 FAM League and was promoted to Malaysia Premier League. However, the club withdrew from Malaysian football.

=== Kelantan ===
On 6 December 2017, Qayyum signed a one-year contract with Kelantan.

== Career statistics ==
=== Club ===
As of match played 22 October 2017

Appearances and goals by club, season and competition
Club	Season	League			Cup		League Cup		Continental		Total	
Club	Season	Division	Apps	Goals	Apps	Goals	Apps	Goals	Apps	Goals	Apps	Goals
Negeri Sembilan	2006-07	Malaysia Super League	0	0	0	0	0	0	–		0	0
Negeri Sembilan	2007-08	Malaysia Super League	0	0	0	0	0	0	0	0	0	0
Negeri Sembilan	2009	Malaysia Super League	0	0	0	0	0	0	–		0	0
Negeri Sembilan	2010	Malaysia Super League	0	0	0	0	0	0	–		0	0
Negeri Sembilan	2011	Malaysia Super League	14	0	0	0	0	0	–		0	0
Negeri Sembilan	2012	Malaysia Super League	4	0	0	0	0	0	–		0	0
Negeri Sembilan	2013	Malaysia Super League	0	0	0	0	0	0	–		0	0
Negeri Sembilan	2014	Malaysia Super League	0	0	0	0	0	0	–		0	0
Negeri Sembilan	Total		0	0	0	0	0	0	–		0	0
Sime Darby	2015	Malaysia Super League	18	0	2	0	–		–		20	0
Sime Darby	2016	Malaysia Premier League	10	0	3	0	–		–		13	0
Sime Darby	2017	Malaysia FAM League	16	1	2	0	–		–		18	1
Sime Darby	Total		44	1	7	0	–		–		51	1
Kelantan	2018	Malaysia Super League	0	0	0	0	0	0	–		0	0
Kelantan	Total		0	0	0	0	0	0	–		0	0
Career Total			0	0	0	0	0	0	–	–	0	0

== Honours ==
=== Club ===
Negeri Sembilan

- Malaysia Cup: 2009, 2011
- Malaysia FA Cup: 2010
- Malaysia Charity Shield: 2012

Sime Darby

- Malaysia FAM League: 2017
