= Wan Jamak =

Malaysian footballer

Personal information
- Birth name: Wan Jamak bin Wan Hassan
- Date of birth: 22 November 1957 (age 68)
- Place of birth: Johor, Malaysia
- Position: Defender

Team information
- Current team: Kuching City (Technical Director)

Senior career*
Years	Team	Apps	(Gls)
1977–1990	Johor	??	(??)

International career
1975–1980	Malaysia	36	(1)

Managerial career
- 1993–1995: Johor
- 1996–1997: Malaysia
- 2006–2007: Melaka TM
- 2008–2011: Negeri Sembilan
- 2011–2012: Kedah
- 2013–2014: PKNS
- 2015–2020: Johor Darul Ta'zim (head of youth)
- 2021–: Kuching City (technical director)
- * Club domestic league appearances and goals

Wan Jamak bin Wan Hassan (born 22 November 1957) is a Malaysian former footballer who is currently working as a technical director at Malaysia Super League club Kuching City.

Wan Jamak was a former football player for Johor and the Malaysian national team. In 1980, He also part of Malaysia squad in the AFC Asian Cup in Kuwait. He had also coached several team in the Malaysian domestic league, and also coached the Malaysia national team.

== Honours ==
=== Johor ===
- Malaysia Kings Gold Cup: 1979; runner up 1978

=== Malaysia ===
- SEA Games: 1979
- Pestabola Merdeka: 1979

=== Negeri Sembilan ===
- Malaysia FA Cup: 2010
- Malaysia Cup: 2009; runner-up 2010

=== Malaysia ===
- AFF Championship runner-up: 1996
