= Marian Farbák =

Slovak footballer

Personal information
- Date of birth: 10 February 1983 (age 43)
- Place of birth: Myjava, Czechoslovakia
- Height: 1.93 m (6 ft 4 in)
- Position: Centre back

Youth career
- Spartak Myjava
- 2000–2002: Dukla Banská Bystrica

Senior career*
Years	Team	Apps	(Gls)
- ŠKP Devín
2002–2003	Dolní Kounice	13	(0)
2003–2006	Kroměříž		
2006–2007	Zlín	9	(0)
2007–2008	Kladno	26	(0)
2008–2011	Tatran Prešov	80	(5)
2012	Negeri Sembilan		
- * Club domestic league appearances and goals

Marian Farbák (born 10 February 1983) is a Slovak retired football player. He played in the Czech First League in the Czech Republic between 2006 and 2008.

Marian is a product of the TJ Spartak Myjava youth academy.
