= Nazrin Nawi =

Malaysian footballer

Personal information
- Full name: Mohd Nazrin bin Mohd Nawi
- Date of birth: 7 February 1988 (age 38)
- Place of birth: Kelantan, Malaysia
- Height: 1.72 m (5 ft 7 1/2 in)
- Positions: Left winger; attacking midfielder

Team information
- Current team: WTS FC
- Number: 20

Youth career
- 2001–2005: Bukit Jalil Sports School

Senior career*
| Years | Team | Apps | (Gls) |
| 2009 | UPB-MyTeam | 16 | (2) |
| 2010 | KL Plus | 18 | (3) |
| 2011 | Kuala Lumpur | 18 | (0) |
| 2012–2013 | Negeri Sembilan | 30 | (2) |
| 2014–2016 | Johor Darul Ta'zim | 32 | (2) |
| 2017–2018 | Perak | 32 | (3) |
| 2019 | Melaka United | 7 | (2) |
| 2020–2021 | Kelantan | 6 | (1) |
| 2022 | Respect FC | | |
| 2022 | Harini F.T. | 10 | (1) |
| 2023 | BRM FC | | |
| 2024– | WTS FC | 6 | (2) |

International career
| 2013– | Malaysia | 10 | (0) |
- * Club domestic league appearances and goals as of 30 December 2024

Mohd Nazrin bin Mohd Nawi (born 7 February 1988) is a Malaysian footballer currently playing for WTS FC. Nazrin mainly plays as a winger but can also play as an attacking midfielder.

== Club career ==
Besides poor performance in the league, Nazrin played well and become fan favourite. His speed and direct running always gave a constant threat to opponent defender. Nazrin scored a hat-trick during 2013 Malaysia Cup playoff playing against Sabah at the Shah Alam Stadium.

After his contract with Negeri Sembilan ended in November 2013, Nazrin signed with Malaysian club Johor Darul Ta'zim.

In December 2016, Nazrin completed his transfer to Perak for a fee reported to be around RM 1.5 million along with his teammate Jasazrin Jamaluddin. Nazrin made his league debut for Perak in 0–1 win over Penang on 27 January 2017.

In 2023, Nazrin came out of retirement to join BRM FC in the Malaysian M3 League.

He then joined WTS FC for the 2024-2025 season.

== Career statistics ==
=== International ===
As of 28 August 2017

Appearances and goals by national team and year
| National team | Year | Apps | Goals |
|---|---|---|---|
| Malaysia | 2013 | 4 | 0 |
| Malaysia | 2014 | 2 | 0 |
| Malaysia | 2015 | 1 | 0 |
| Malaysia | 2016 | 2 | 0 |
| Malaysia | 2017 | 1 | 0 |
| Total | | 10 | 0 |

== Honour ==
=== Club ===
Johor Darul Ta'zim

- Malaysian Charity Shield: 2015, 2016
- Malaysian Super League: 2014, 2015, 2016
- Malaysia Cup: Runner-up 2014
- Malaysia FA Cup: 2016
- AFC Cup: 2015

Perak TBG

- Malaysian Super League: Runners-up 2018
- Malaysia Cup: 2018
