= Muszaki Abu Bakar =

Malaysian footballer

Personal information
- Full name: Muszaki bin Abu Bakar
- Date of birth: 15 March 1989 (age 37)
- Place of birth: Selangor, Malaysia
- Height: 1.78 m (5 ft 10 in)
- Position: Right back

Team information
- Current team: Perlis

Youth career
- 2006: Selangor FA President Cup

Senior career*
Years	Team	Apps	(Gls)
2007–2009	Harimau Muda		
2010	Harimau Muda A		
2010–2014	Negeri Sembilan	17	(0)
2015–2016	Kuantan	0	(0)
2017–	Perlis	0	(0)

International career^{‡}
2007–2010	Malaysia U-21	20	(0)
- * Club domestic league appearances and goals as of 14 February 2017 ‡ National team caps and goals as of 22 May 2009

Muszaki Abu Bakar (born 15 March 1989 in Selangor) is a Malaysian footballer who plays for Malaysia Premier League club, Perlis FA as a right-back.
