= Ahmad Shakir Mohd Ali =

Malaysian footballer

Shakir Ali
Personal information
- Full name: Ahmad Shakir bin Mohd Ali
- Date of birth: 9 January 1989 (age 37)
- Place of birth: Jitra, Kedah, Malaysia
- Height: 1.86 m (6 ft 1 in)
- Position: Forward

Team information
- Current team: PDRM FA (loan from PKNS FC)
- Number: 27

Youth career
- 2004–2008: Kedah FA President Cup

Senior career*
Years	Team	Apps	(Gls)
2008–2010	Harimau Muda A		
2010–2011	Kedah FA		
2012–2013	Negeri Sembilan FA		
2014	Kelantan FA	17	(7)
2015	Kedah FA	19	(3)
2016–	PKNS FC		
2017–	→ PDRM FA (loan)		

International career^{‡}
2007–2009	Malaysia U-21		
2009–2012	Malaysia U-23		
2009–	Malaysia	10	(3)
- * Club domestic league appearances and goals as of 29 December 2015 ‡ National team caps and goals as of 29 December 2015

Ahmad Shakir Md Ali (born 9 January 1989) is a Malaysian footballer who plays as a striker for PDRM FA, on loan from PKNS FC.

== Career ==
=== Harimau Muda A ===
Shakir started his football career as a striker for Kedah President Cup Team. He then plays for Harimau Muda A where he achieve his personal best season by scoring 16 league goals in the 2009 Malaysia Premier League season, the Malaysia second tier professional football league.

=== Kedah FA ===
He then decided to leave the Young Tigers, for a return to his boyhood team, Kedah in order for him to be closer to his sick father at that time. However his from drop significantly and regularly found himself out of the first team line-up.

=== Negeri Sembilan FA ===
Struggling for first team actions, he then makes another move to newly crowned Malaysia Cup winners, Negeri Sembilan who are losing their main striker Hairuddin Omar to big-spending Premier League club ATM.

He scored his first league goals for Negeri Sembilan 2–0 win over Johor FC, scoring both goals.

=== Kelantan FA ===
After his contract with Negeri Sembilan ended, he decided to join Kelantan FA and signed two years contract. On 4 February 2014, Shakir scored his first ever goal with Kelantan in first round FA Cup match 2–1 win against Sabah FA. On 18 March 2014, Shakir was sent off in 34th minute after kicked Vissai Ninh Binh player, Le Van Thang.

== International career ==
He is a member of the Malaysia national team and in summer 2009 he played twice against Manchester United in their pre season tour of the Far East.

Later in August the same year, he has been called up by K. Rajagobal again to play against Kenya, China and Saudi Arabia. He scored his first goal for Malaysia against Saudi Arabia, which Malaysia lost 2–1.

After more than 2 years, Shakir was recalled to the national team, following his performance in the league for Negeri Sembilan. He scored his second senior goal, when his equalising goal gave Malaysia a 1–1 draw against Philippines in a friendly match on 29 February 2012. Shakir scored his fourth senior goal against Singapore which Malaysia won by 2–0.

Shakir have also played for the Malaysia U-23 for the 2012 Olympic qualifiers.

== Honours ==
Harimau Muda A

- Malaysia Premier League:2009

Kedah FA

- Malaysia FA Cup:Runner-up 2010

Negeri Sembilan FA

- Sultan Haji Ahmad Shah Cup:2012

== International goals ==
#	Date	Venue	Opponent	Score	Result	Competition
1.	20 August 2009	Dammam, Saudi Arabia	Saudi Arabia	1–2	Lost	Friendly
2.	29 February 2012	Manila, Philippines	Philippines	1–1	Draw	Friendly
3.	12 June 2012	Selangor, Malaysia	Singapore	2–0	Win	Friendly
