= G. Mahathevan =

Malaysian footballer

Personal information
- Full name: Mahathevan a/l Gengatharan
- Date of birth: 31 May 1988 (age 38)
- Place of birth: Setapak, Kuala Lumpur, Malaysia
- Height: 1.90 m (6 ft 3 in)
- Position: Defender

Youth career
- 2006–2008: Selangor FA Reserves and Academy

Senior career*
Years	Team	Apps	(Gls)
2009	Shahzan Muda	18	(1)
2010	PKNS	16	(0)
2011–2012	Negeri Sembilan	20	(3)
2012–2013	T-Team	5	(0)
2014	Penang	18	(3)
2015	Sarawak	3	(0)
2016	Megah Murni	0	(0)
2017	Penang	3	(0)
2018	MISC-MIFA	2	(0)

International career^{‡}
2009–2012	Malaysia	2	(0)
- * Club domestic league appearances and goals as of June 26, 2018 ‡ National team caps and goals as of January 25, 2017

G. Mahathevan (born 31 May 1988) is a Malaysian former footballer.

In February 2011, Mahathevan was called up to the Malaysia national team for the first time by coach K. Rajagopal for the friendly match against Hong Kong national team where he made his debut as a substitute player.
