= S. Kunanlan =

Malaysian footballer

Personal information
- Full name: Kunanlan a/l Subramaniam
- Date of birth: 15 September 1986 (age 40)
- Place of birth: Semenyih, Selangor, Malaysia
- Height: 1.68 m (5 ft 6 in)
- Positions: Winger; right back

Senior career*
Years	Team	Apps	(Gls)
2007–2012	Negeri Sembilan	?	(16)
2013–2014	Selangor	38	(4)
2015–2024	Johor Darul Ta'zim	103	(2)

International career^{‡}
2008–2010	Malaysia U23	18	(1)
2009–2017	Malaysia	74	(0)
Medal record
Men's Football
Representing Malaysia
Southeast Asian Games
Winner	2009 Laos
AFF Championship
Winner	2010 Indonesia & Vietnam
Runner-up	2014 Singapore & Vietnam
- * Club domestic league appearances and goals as of July 20, 2022 ‡ National team caps and goals as of July 14, 2016

Kunanlan a/l Subramaniam (born 15 September 1986) is a Malaysian former professional footballer who played as a right-back and also as winger. Kunanlan is known for his fast and speedy style of football. He loves to take on defenders with his pace.

== Club career ==
=== Negeri Sembilan ===
Kunanlan started his professional career with Negeri Sembilan under the management of Wan Jamak Wan Hassan. He made his debut in a home match against Selangor during the 2007-08 Malaysia Super League. He scored his first goal in a 2–3 away win against Sarawak. With Negeri Sembilan, he won the 2009 and 2011 Malaysia Cup and the 2010 Malaysia FA Cup.

=== Selangor ===
Kunanlan joins Selangor for the 2013 Malaysia Super League after 6 years with Negeri Sembilan. He made his debut on 8 January 2013 and scored his first Selangor FA goal, against his former club Negeri Sembilan FA 1–0. After that, Kunanlan added his second goal against Terengganu FA 2–1 to help Selangor FA to get three points in third game week. On 9 March 2013, he scored against Johor Darul Takzim FC in 4 minutes first half to win 4–1 in victory and have a third goal in 2013 Malaysia Super League season.

=== Johor Darul Ta'zim ===
Kunanlan joined Johor Darul Ta'azim (JDT) for the 2015 season. He played more than 190 matches in all competitions for JDT. He won 9 Malaysia Super League titles, 3 Malaysia FA Cups and 4 Malaysia Cups in his 9 years with JDT. He described winning the AFC Cup in 2015 as the biggest achievement in his career.

== International career ==
Kunanlan made his international debut in 2008 with Malaysia national under 23 team in a 1–1 draw against Maldives. In 2009, he earned his first official international caps in a friendly match against Kenya. He won the football gold medal with Malaysia national under-23 football team in the 2009 SEA Games.

In 2010 Kunanlan selected as one of the overage players for the 2010 Asian Games. He was sent-off in a controversial group stage match against host China. In November 2010, he was called up to the Malaysia national squad by coach K. Rajagopal for the 2010 AFF Suzuki Cup. Malaysia won the 2010 AFF Suzuki Cup title for the first time in their history.

He also played for the Malaysia XI in summer 2009 against Manchester United in their pre-season tour of the Far East. In July 2011, he played in the matches against Arsenal FC and Liverpool FC who were on their pre-season tours, which a Malaysia XI lost 0–4 against Arsenal and later lost 3–6 to Liverpool. They also lost to Chelsea FC 0–1.

On 14 July 2016, Kunanlan announced his retirement from international football after 73 international caps. He return in 2017 for his 74th cap which also his last appearances with Malaysia against Korea DPR at the 2019 AFC Asian Cup qualification.

=== International goals ===
==== Under-23 ====
No	Date	Venue	Opponent	Score	Result	Competition
1.	8 December 2009	Vientiane, Laos	Cambodia	3–0	4–0	2009 SEA Games

== Career statistics ==
=== Club ===
As of 12 December 2023

Appearances and goals by club, season and competition
Club	Season	League (Note: Including Malaysia Charity Shield)			Cup		League Cup		Continental (Note: Including AFC Cup and AFC Champions League)		Total	
Club	Season	Division	Apps	Goals	Apps	Goals	Apps	Goals	Apps	Goals	Apps	Goals
Negeri Sembilan	2007-08	Malaysia Super League		8		0		3	—			11
Negeri Sembilan	2009	Malaysia Super League		5		1		2	—			8
Negeri Sembilan	2010	Malaysia Super League		0		3		0	—			3
Negeri Sembilan	2011	Malaysia Super League	21	1	1	0	11	2	—		33	3
Negeri Sembilan	2012	Malaysia Super League	23	2	1	0	6	0	—		30	2
Negeri Sembilan	Total			16		4		7	—			27
Selangor	2013	Malaysia Super League	17	3	2	0	6	2	4	0	29	5
Selangor	2014	Malaysia Super League	21	1	1	0	8	0	5	0	35	1
Selangor	Total		38	4	3	0	14	2	9	0	64	6
Johor Darul Ta'zim	2015	Malaysia Super League	19	0	1	0	6	0	11	0	37	0
Johor Darul Ta'zim	2016	Malaysia Super League	19	0	6	0	2	0	8	0	35	0
Johor Darul Ta'zim	2017	Malaysia Super League	18	2	3	0	9	1	6	0	36	3
Johor Darul Ta'zim	2018	Malaysia Super League	17	0	1	0	8	1	5	0	31	1
Johor Darul Ta'zim	2019	Malaysia Super League	15	0	0	0	8	0	5	0	28	0
Johor Darul Ta'zim	2020	Malaysia Super League	5	0	0	0	0	0	2	0	7	0
Johor Darul Ta'zim	2021	Malaysia Super League	9	0	—		5	0	4	0	18	0
Johor Darul Ta'zim	2022	Malaysia Super League	1	0	0	0	1	0	1	0	3	0
Johor Darul Ta'zim	2023	Malaysia Super League	0	0	0	0	0	0	0	0	0	0
Johor Darul Ta'zim	Total		103	2	11	0	39	2	42	0	195	4
Career Total												

== Honours ==
=== Club ===
==== Negeri Sembilan ====
- Malaysia Cup: 2009, 2011
- Malaysia FA Cup: 2010
- Malaysia Charity Shield: 2012

==== Johor Darul Ta'zim ====
- AFC Cup: 2015
- Malaysia Super League: 2015, 2016, 2017, 2018, 2019, 2020, 2021, 2022, 2023
- Malaysia FA Cup: 2016, 2022, 2023
- Malaysia Cup: 2017, 2019, 2022, 2023
- Malaysia Charity Shield: 2015, 2016, 2018, 2019, 2020, 2021, 2022, 2023

=== Malaysia U23 ===
- 2009 SEA Games: Gold

=== Malaysia ===
- 2010 AFF Suzuki Cup: Winner
- 2014 AFF Suzuki Cup: Runner Up
