= 2010 Malaysia FA Cup =

Piala FA

Tournament details
- Country: Malaysia
- Teams: 30

Final positions
- Champions: Negeri Sembilan FA (2nd title)
- Runners-up: Kedah FA

Tournament statistics
- Matches played: 28
- Goals scored: 82 (2.93 per match)

The 2010 Malaysia FA Cup, also known as the 2010 TM Piala FA due to the competition's sponsorship by TM, was the 21st season of the Malaysia FA Cup.

Negeri Sembilan FA has won the competition after defeating Kedah FA in the final.

== Format ==
The Piala FA competition reverted to the old format of play with no more open draws. It involved 30 teams — 16 Super League and 14 Premier League sides — with defending champions Selangor FA and Kelantan FA receiving byes in the first round.

== First round ==
The first leg matches were played on 2 February 2010 while the second legs were held on 6 February 2010.

Team 1	Agg.	Team 2	1st leg	2nd leg
SDMS Kepala Batas FC (Penang)	0–3	(Selangor) PKNS FC	0–2	0–1
Pahang FA	2–4	(Federal Territories of Malaysia) Felda United FC	1–1	1–3
Muar Municipal Council FC (Johor)	2–5	(Federal Territories of Malaysia) Pos Malaysia FC	1–0	1–5
KL PLUS FC (Federal Territories of Malaysia)	4–3	(Malaysia) Harimau Muda B	1–2	3–1
Kuala Lumpur FA (Federal Territories of Malaysia)	3–1	Johor FA	3–1	0–0
PDRM FA (Malaysia)	6–2	(Johor) Melodi Jaya S.C.	5–1	1–1
Johor FC	5–7	Negeri Sembilan FA	2–2	3–5
Perlis FA	1–2	Perak FA	0–0	1–2
PBDKT T-Team FC (Terengganu)	4–0	(Pahang) Kuantan Port Shahzan Muda FC	1–0	3–0
Penang FA	2–2 (a)	Sarawak FA	2–1	0–1
USM FC (Penang)	1–7	Terengganu FA	1–4	0–3
UiTM FC (Selangor)	6–0	(Selangor) Juara Ban Hoe Leong FC	3–0	3–0
ATM FA (Malaysia)	6–1	Malacca FA	3–0	3–1
Sabah FA	0–3	Kedah FA	0–2	0–1
Selangor FA	Bye	X	X	X
Kelantan FA	Bye	X	X	X

== Second round ==
The first leg matches was played on 16 February 2010, and the second legs was held on 20 February 2010.

Team 1	Agg.	Team 2	1st leg	2nd leg
Selangor FA	2–1	(Selangor) PKNS FC	2–0	0–1
Felda United FC (Federal Territories of Malaysia)	2–3	(Federal Territories of Malaysia) Pos Malaysia FC	1–1	1–2
KL PLUS FC (Federal Territories of Malaysia)	4–1	(Federal Territories of Malaysia) Kuala Lumpur FA	3–0	1–1
PDRM FA (Malaysia)	2–8	Negeri Sembilan FA	2–3	0–5
PBDKT T-Team FC (Terengganu)	3–1	Perak FA	1–1	0–2
Sarawak FA	1–4	Terengganu FA	0–2	1–2
ATM FA (Malaysia)	6–0	(Selangor) UiTM FC	3–0	3–0
Kedah FA	(a)1–1	Kelantan FA	0–0	1–1

== Quarter-finals ==
The first leg matches was played on 9 March 2010, and the second legs was held on 20 March 2010.

Team 1	Agg.	Team 2	1st leg	2nd leg
Selangor FA	8–1	(Federal Territories of Malaysia) Pos Malaysia FC	5–1	3–0
KL PLUS FC (Federal Territories of Malaysia)	2–3	Negeri Sembilan FA	1–0	1–3
PBDKT T-Team FC (Terengganu)	4–5	Terengganu FA	3–1	1–4
ATM FA (Malaysia)	1–6	Kedah FA	1–1	0–5

== Semi-finals ==
The first leg matches was played on 30 March 2010, and the second legs was held on 3 April 2010.

Team 1	Agg.	Team 2	1st leg	2nd leg
Selangor FA	2–2(a)	Negeri Sembilan FA	1–2	1–0
Terengganu FA	1–4	Kedah FA	0–2	1–2

== Finals ==
The final was played at National Stadium, Bukit Jalil, Kuala Lumpur, on Saturday, 10 April 2010.

2010-04-10
20:45 UTC+8

Negeri Sembilan	1 – 1	Kedah
Shaffik 39'		Baddrol 27'
Penalties
Mohd Zaquan Adha Abdul Radzak (penalty missed); Norizam Salaman (penalty scored); Mohd Aidil Zafuan Abdul Radzak (penalty scored); S. Kunanlan (penalty scored); Muhammad Shukor Adan (penalty scored); Muhamad Asyriff Afiq Shahrulzaman (penalty missed); Rezal Zambery Yahya (penalty scored)	5 – 4	(penalty scored) Shahrulnizam Mustapa; (penalty scored) Baddrol Bakhtiar; (penalty missed) Mohd Fazliata Taib; (penalty scored) Mohd Azmi Muslim; (penalty scored) Muhammad Aminuddin Azmi; (penalty missed) Mohd Helmi Eliza Elias; (penalty missed) Mohd Sabre Mat Abu

National Stadium, Bukit Jalil, Kuala Lumpur
Attendance: 70,000
Referee: (Malaysia) R. Krishnan
- Negeri Sembilan win 5–4 on penalties

== Winners ==
Piala FA 2010 Winner

Negeri Sembilan
2nd Piala FA Title
