= Qhairul Anwar Roslani =

Malaysian footballer

Qhairul Anwar
Personal information
- Full name: Qhairul Anwar bin Mohamad Roslani
- Date of birth: 22 January 1987 (age 39)
- Place of birth: Seremban, Negeri Sembilan, Malaysia
- Height: 1.78 m (5 ft 10 in)
- Position: Defender

Team information
- Current team: PDRM FA
- Number: 16

Youth career
- 2005–2006: Negeri Sembilan FA President Cup

Senior career*
| Years | Team | Apps | (Gls) |
| 2007–2012 | Negeri Sembilan FA | 24 | (0) |
| 2013 | Terengganu FA | 17 | (0) |
| 2014–2015 | Felda United F.C. | 3 | (0) |
| 2016– | PDRM FA | 0 | (0) |
- * Club domestic league appearances and goals as of 27 March 2014 ‡ National team caps and goals as of 27 March 2014

Qhairul Anwar Roslani (born 22 January 1987 in Seremban, Negeri Sembilan) is a Malaysian footballer currently playing for PDRM FA in Malaysia Super League as a defender.

He was a member of the Negeri Sembilan FA team that made the final of the 2010 Malaysia Cup, but lost to Kelantan FA.
