= K. Thanaraj =

Malaysian footballer

Personal information
- Full name: Thanaraj a/l Kumarasamy
- Date of birth: 3 January 1986 (age 40)
- Place of birth: Seremban, Negeri Sembilan, Malaysia
- Height: 1.76 m (5 ft 9 1/2 in)
- Position: Winger

Youth career
- 2001–2004: Negeri Sembilan

Senior career*
Years	Team	Apps	(Gls)
2005–2010	Negeri Sembilan		
2011–2012	Sabah		
2013	Darul Takzim		
2014	Felda United		
2015	Selangor		
2016	Sarawak	12	(0)
- * Club domestic league appearances and goals as of January 24, 2017

K. Thanaraj (born 3 January 1986 in Seremban, Negeri Sembilan) is a Malaysian footballer.
