= Abdul Halim Zainal =

Malaysian footballer

Halim Zainal
Personal information
- Full name: Abdul Halim bin Zainal
- Date of birth: 29 July 1988 (age 38)
- Place of birth: Negeri Sembilan, Malaysia
- Height: 1.72 m (5 ft 7 1/2 in)
- Position: Midfielder

Team information
- Current team: Immigration
- Number: 88

Youth career
- 2004–2005: Bukit Jalil Sports School
- 2006–2007: Negeri Sembilan U-21

Senior career*
Years	Team	Apps	(Gls)
2008–2014	Negeri Sembilan	93	(15)
2015	Sime Darby	15	(0)
2016	Kuala Lumpur	2	(0)
2017–2018	Selangor	27	(0)
2019–2021	Negeri Sembilan	25	(0)
2023–	Immigration	0	(0)

International career^{‡}
2010	Malaysia	1	(0)
- * Club domestic league appearances and goals as of 26 March 2023 ‡ National team caps and goals as of 20 February 2017

Abdul Halim bin Zainal (born 29 July 1988 in Seremban, Negeri Sembilan) is a Malaysian footballer who plays for Immigration in Malaysia M3 League.

He is the younger brother of former Malaysia international player, Faizal Zainal and Khairil Zainal.

He started to impress in 2010 season where he help Negeri Sembilan to reach Malaysian Cup final and win FA Cup. He also win the 2011 Malaysia Cup with Negeri Sembilan. In 2012 he also help Negeri Sembilan to win Piala Sultan Haji Ahmad Shah cup. He has shown his great abilities in midfield area.

== Club career ==
=== Selangor ===
Halim signed a contract with Selangor in 2017.

== Career statistics ==
=== Club ===
As of 30 June 2018.

Appearances and goals by club, season and competition
Club	Season	League			Cup		League Cup		Continental^{1}		Total	
Club	Season	Division	Apps	Goals	Apps	Goals	Apps	Goals	Apps	Goals	Apps	Goals
Kuala Lumpur	2016	Malaysia Premier League	2	0	0	0	4	0	–		6	0
Kuala Lumpur	Total		2	0	0	0	4	0	–		6	0
Selangor	2017	Malaysia Super League	18	0	1	0	4	0	–		23	0
Selangor	2018	Malaysia Super League	9	0	5	0	0	0	0	0	14	0
Selangor	Total		27	0	6	0	4	0	0	0	37	0
Career Total			0	0	0	0	0	0	0	0	0	0

^{1} Includes AFC Cup and AFC Champions League.
