= Firdaus Azizul =

Malaysian footballer

Personal information
- Full name: Mohd Firdaus bin Azizul
- Date of birth: 3 January 1988 (age 38)
- Place of birth: Seremban, Negeri Sembilan, Malaysia
- Height: 1.78 m (5 ft 10 in)
- Position: Forward

Team information
- Current team: Gombak
- Number: 19

Youth career
- 2006–2008: Negeri Sembilan

Senior career*
Years	Team	Apps	(Gls)
2009–2014	Negeri Sembilan	64	(25)
2015–2016	Sime Darby	18	(4)
2017–2018	Felcra FC	19	(6)
2019–2022	KSR Sains		
2022	Imigresen		(22)
2023	KSR Sains		
2024–	Gombak		
- * Club domestic league appearances and goals

Mohd Firdaus bin Azizul (born 3 January 1988 in Seremban, Negeri Sembilan) is a Malaysian professional footballer who plays as a forward. He plays for Gombak since 2024.

== Career statistics ==
=== Club ===
As of 21 May 2018.

Appearances and goals by club, season and competition
Club	Season	League			Cup		Malaysia Cup		Continental		Total	
Club	Season	Division	Apps	Goals	Apps	Goals	Apps	Goals	Apps	Goals	Apps	Goals
Negeri Sembilan	2009	Liga Super	14	5	0	0	2	1	–		16	6
Negeri Sembilan	2010	Liga Super	10	2	0	0	3	0	–		13	2
Negeri Sembilan	2011	Liga Super	19	7	0	0	0	0	–		19	7
Negeri Sembilan	2012	Liga Super	2	4	0	0	5	2	–		7	6
Negeri Sembilan	2013	Liga Super	10	1	0	0	0	0	–		19	7
Negeri Sembilan	2014	Liga Premier	0	0	0	0	0	0	–		0	0
Total			64	25	0	0	8	3	–		72	28
Sime Darby	2015	Liga Super	11	4	0	0	3	1	–		14	5
Sime Darby	2016	Liga Premier	7	0	1	0	0	0	–		8	0
Total			18	4	1	0	3	1	–		22	5
Felcra	2017	Liga FAM	15	6	2	1	–				17	7
Felcra	2018	Liga Premier	3	0	1	0	0	0	–		4	0
Total			18	6	3	1	0	0	–		21	7
Career Total			100	35	4	1	11	4	–	–	115	41

== Honours ==
- Malaysia Cup: 2009, 2011
- Malaysia FA Cup: 2010

=== International ===
Malaysia U-20

- AFF U-20 Youth Championship: 2007 runner-up

=== Individual ===
- Malaysia A1 Semi-Pro League Top Scorer: 2022
