= Idris Abdul Karim =

Malaysian footballer

Idris Karim
Personal information
- Full name: Idris Abdul Karim
- Date of birth: 29 November 1976 (age 49)
- Place of birth: Johor, Malaysia
- Position: Defensive midfielder

Team information
- Current team: Johor Darul Takzim (scout)

Senior career*
Years	Team	Apps	(Gls)
1996–1999	Johor FA	69	(11)
2000	Pahang FA	21	(1)
2001–2004	Johor FC	52	(10)
2005–2013	Negeri Sembilan FA	87	(9)

International career
1995–2005	Malaysia	28	(1)
- * Club domestic league appearances and goals

Idris Abdul Karim (born 29 November 1976) is a Malaysian former footballer who now works as scout for Johor Darul Takzim in the Malaysia Super League.

Karim is a Johor-born defensive midfielder. He played with Johor FA for three seasons before moving to Pahang FA. He later returned to his home town and joined club side Johor FC. He later joined Negeri Sembilan FA and became an influential figure on the Hoben Jang Hoben team.

He represented Malaysia from 1995 to 2005, scoring once in 28 appearances. Karim played in a friendly match against Arsenal in 1999. He also represented Malaysia's futsal squad in the 1999 AFC Futsal Championship.
