= Badrulzaman Abdul Halim =

Malaysian footballer

Personal information
- Full name: Badrulzaman bin Abdul Halim
- Date of birth: 2 April 1978 (age 48)
- Place of birth: Selangor, Malaysia
- Position: Goalkeeper

Youth career
- 1996–1998: Selangor President Cup Team

Senior career*
Years	Team	Apps	(Gls)
1999	Selangor FA		
2000	Sabah FA		
2001–2008	PKNS FC		
2009	Perlis FA		
2009–2011	PKNS FC		
2012–2014	Negeri Sembilan FA		
2015	PDRM FA		
2016	Kuala Lumpur FA		
2017	Melaka United	6	(0)

International career^{‡}
2008	Malaysia	2	(0)
- * Club domestic league appearances and goals as of July 15, 2017 ‡ National team caps and goals as of January 24, 2017

Badrulzaman Abdul Halim (born on 2 April 1978 Selangor) is a Malaysian footballer who is currently a goalkeeper. He was a member of the Malaysian national team.

He was twice called up for Malaysia squad friendly against Indonesia and India in June and July 2008. He was also included in the 2008 Merdeka Tournament but was not chosen to play.

At the 2008 Myanmar Grand Royal Challenge Cup, Badrulzaman made his international debut against Vietnam on 12 November 2008 although it is not FIFA International 'A' matches. On 18 November 2008, Badrulzaman made his debut in 'A' international matches against Myanmar.
