= Fiqri Azwan Ghazali =

Malaysian footballer

Fiqri Azwan
Personal information
- Full name: Fiqri Azwan bin Abdul Ghazali
- Date of birth: 20 March 1992 (age 34)
- Place of birth: Seremban, Negeri Sembilan, Malaysia
- Height: 1.78 m (5 ft 10 in)
- Position: Left back

Team information
- Current team: Felcra
- Number: 11

Youth career
- 2009: Negeri Sembilan

Senior career*
Years	Team	Apps	(Gls)
2010–2013	Negeri Sembilan	3	(0)
2014	Putrajaya SPA	18	(0)
2015–2016	Melaka United	13	(0)
2017	Felcra F.C.	0	(0)

International career^{‡}
	Malaysia	0	(0)
- * Club domestic league appearances and goals as of July 13, 2016 ‡ National team caps and goals as of July 13, 2016

Fiqri Azwan bin Abdul Ghazali (born 20 March 1992 in Seremban, Negeri Sembilan) is a Malaysian footballer currently playing for Felcra FC in the Malaysia FAM League.

== Honours ==
Melaka United

- Malaysia Premier League:2016
