= Mohd Shaffik Abdul Rahman =

Malaysian footballer

Shaffik Abdul Rahman
Personal information
- Full name: Mohd Shaffik bin Abdul rahman
- Date of birth: 14 July 1984 (age 42)
- Place of birth: Johor, Malaysia
- Height: 1.77 m (5 ft 9 1/2 in)
- Position: Winger

Team information
- Current team: Negeri Sembilan FA

Youth career
- 2005–2007: Johor FA President Cup

Senior career*
Years	Team	Apps	(Gls)
2007	UPB-MyTeam FC		
2008–2012	Negeri Sembilan		
- * Club domestic league appearances and goals as of 21 May 2009 ‡ National team caps and goals as of 22 May 2009

Shaffik Abdul Rahman (born 14 July 1984) is a Malaysian footballer lastly playing for Negeri Sembilan FA in Malaysia Super League. He was born in Johor.
