= Alif Samsudin =

Malaysian footballer

Personal information
- Full name: Mohd Alif bin Samsudin
- Date of birth: 1 February 1989 (age 37)
- Place of birth: Negeri Sembilan, Malaysia
- Height: 1.78 m (5 ft 10 in)
- Position: Centre-back

Team information
- Current team: KSR SAINS
- Number: 29

Youth career
- 2007–2008: Negeri Sembilan President Cup

Senior career*
| Years | Team | Apps | (Gls) |
| 2009–2014 | Negeri Sembilan | | |
| 2015 | Sime Darby | 13 | (2) |
| 2016–2017 | Melaka United | 16 | (0) |
| 2017 | → Felcra (loan) | 17 | (1) |
| 2018 | Felcra | 14 | (2) |
| 2019–2020 | Kuala Lumpur | 6 | (0) |
| 2021 | UiTM | 7 | (0) |
| 2023– | KSR SAINS | 0 | (0) |

International career^{‡}
| 2010 | Malaysia | 1 | (0) |
- * Club domestic league appearances and goals as of March 5, 2023 ‡ National team caps and goals as of July 13, 2016

Mohd Alif bin Samsudin (born 1 February 1989 in Seremban, Negeri Sembilan) is a Malaysian footballer who plays for KSR SAINS as a Centre-back.

Among his achievements is helping Negeri Sembilan to win 2009 Malaysia Cup and 2010 FA Cup. He also played in the 2010 Malaysia Cup final where his team lost 2–1 to Kelantan.

He has been called up to Malaysia national football team for a friendly match against Yemen national football team in 2010, and made his debut in this match.

== Honours ==
Melaka United

- Malaysia Premier League: 2016
