= 2000s Negeri Sembilan FA seasons =

Negeri Sembilan
2000–2009 season
- Stadium: Tuanku Abdul Rahman Stadium

Negeri Sembilan Football Club (Malay: Kelab Bola Sepak Negeri Sembilan), commonly referred to as Negeri Sembilan FC or simply NSFC, is a Malaysian professional football club based in Seremban, Negeri Sembilan, Malaysia.

From 2000 to 2009, Negeri Sembilan played in the Premier 1, Premier 2, Super League and the Premier League. During that period, the team has won the FA Cup in 2003, the Super League in 2006, and the Malaysia Cup in 2009. In addition, the team has also been runners-up in the Malaysia Cup in 2000 and 2006, the Charity Cup in 2004, the Super League in 2008, and the Premier League in 2005.

This article displays Negeri Sembilan's squads, competitions, transfers, statistics, and achievements for the period 2000–2009.

== Events (2000–2009) ==
On May 31, 2003, Negeri Sembilan met Perlis in the FA Cup final. Played at Perak Stadium, the club was surprised by the opponent's early goal in the 11th minute. The club managed to close the gap in the 56th minute thanks to a goal by Effendi Malek. The game remained 1-1 until the 90th minute, and in extra time, victory was decided on a golden goal. In the 95th minute, the club managed to get the golden goal as a result of Everson Martinelli's goal, and the club was crowned FA Cup champion in 2003.

In 2004, the capacity of Negeri Sembilan's Tuanku Abdul Rahman Stadium was upgraded to 45,000 people for the hosting of the 2004 Sukma Games. This benefitted Negeri Sembilan fans as the numbers of maximum spectators increased and was best used for the big match such as a derby or a final match.

Negeri Sembilan made its first appearance in the AFC Cup competition in the 2004 season. The club made its debut in the first match against Island FC with a big 6-0 win on February 10, 2004. However, the club had to settle for being 3rd in the group after losing all the group stage matches against Geylang United, East Bengal, and Island FC. All teams played at home and away for a total of six games.

In March 2004, Datuk Seri Mohamad Hasan was appointed as the president of the Negeri Sembilan Football Association (PBNS). It's because he successfully held the position as the 10th Menteri Besar of Negeri Sembilan and replaced Isa Samad, who held that position the previous year. Mohamad Hasan was the first Menteri Besar who had ever been a local football player and then became the president of PBNS. He never represented the first team of Negeri Sembilan but played a lot with clubs in Kuala Lumpur and Selangor. He was banned from football for life after receiving a red card when NS Malays played against NS Indians in 1977. He was active in football in the 1970s.

In the 2006 season, the team won the Malaysia Super League by finishing first out of eight clubs that competed. The newly promoted team from the Malaysian Premier League in the 2005 season managed to become the league champion in their first appearance since the Super League was introduced in 2004.

On November 7, 2009, the team ended their 61-year drought in the Malaysia Cup after posting a 3–1 victory over Kelantan in the final at the National Stadium, Bukit Jalil. The team also won all the matches in the Malaysia Cup tournament, starting from the group stage until the final.

The repeat final of 2009 between the club and Kelantan happened again on October 30, 2010. However, this time, the club lost 1–2 to Kelantan despite having taken an early lead through a penalty by Shahurain Abu Samah.

== 2000 Negeri Sembilan FA season ==
=== Squad ===
Coach: Mohd Zaki Sheikh Ahmad

Goalkeeper

- (Malaysia) 21. Hamsani Ahmad (24 y/o)
- (Malaysia) 22. Mohd Yazid Yassin (25 y/o)
- (Malaysia) Suffian Rahman (22 y/o)

Defender

- (Malaysia) 5. Khairul Anuar Baharom (26 y/o) (Captain)
- (Malaysia) 6. Salim Khamis
- (Malaysia) 9. Ching Hong Aik (27 y/o)
- (Malaysia) 11. Syaiful Sabtu (19 y/o)
- (Malaysia) 12. Leong Hong Seng (25 y/o)
- (Malaysia) 13. Khairun Haled Masrom (23 y/o)
- (Malaysia) 16. Chow Chee Weng (23 y/o)
- (Malaysia) Murugayah Elangoo (23 y/o)

Midfielder

- (Malaysia) 7. Rajan Koran (19 y/o)
- (Malaysia) 15. Fairuz Saleh
- (Malaysia) 18. Mohd Nor Sheikh Ismail
- (Malaysia) 23. Wong Sai Kong (22 y/o)
- (Malaysia) 25. Shukor Adan (21 y/o)
- (Malaysia) Shahrizam Mohamed (21 y/o)
- (Malaysia) Zami Mohd Noor (28 y/o)

Forward

- (Malaysia) 10. Azmi Mohamed (29 y/o)
- (Malaysia) 19. Azman Adnan (29 y/o)
- (Malaysia) 20. Efendi Abdul Malek (22 y/o)

=== Kits and sponsors ===
Manufacturer	Sponsor	Home	Away	Third
Mizuno	Dunhill			

=== Competitions ===
==== Premier 1 ====
Pos	Team	Pld	W	D	L	GF	GA	GD	Pts	Qualification or relegation
1	Selangor	22	14	3	5	41	25	+16	45	Champion
2	Penang	22	12	7	3	35	15	+20	43	
3	Perak	22	12	5	5	35	18	+17	41	
4	Terengganu	22	9	8	5	29	23	+6	35	
5	Sarawak	22	10	5	7	28	22	+6	35	
6	Negeri Sembilan	22	10	3	9	32	26	+6	33	
7	Pahang	22	8	7	7	41	28	+13	31	
8	Kuala Lumpur	22	7	8	7	27	32	−5	29	
9	Perlis	22	6	7	9	24	27	−3	25	
10	Johor	22	6	2	14	27	50	−23	20	
11	Sabah	22	4	4	14	22	41	−19	16	Relegated to Liga Perdana 2
12	Brunei	22	2	5	15	19	53	−34	11	Relegated to Liga Perdana 2

==== Malaysia Cup ====
Table group D:

1.Negri Sembilan 6 6 0 0 20- 4 18

2.Perak 6 3 1 2 7- 8 10

3.Johor 6 1 1 4 7-12 4

4.Kedah 6 0 2 4 2-12 2

Quarter Final

First Legs

Negri Sembilan 4-1 Kelantan

Second Legs

Kelantan 0-3 Negri Sembilan

Semifinals

First Legs

Selangor 2-1 Perak

Sarawak 1-2 Negri Sembilan

Second Legs [Oct 7]

Perak 3-0 Selangor

Negri Sembilan 2-1 Sarawak

Final [Oct 15, Shah Alam Stadium]

Perak 2-0 Negri Sembilan

==== FA Cup ====
Round 1

Negeri Sembilan bye

Round 2

JKR Kelantan 2-1 Negeri Sembilan

[Hashim Mustafa 78, Rosli Ismail 83; Azman Adnan 54]

Negeri Sembilan 5-1 JKR Kelantan

[Md Shukor Adan 50, 78, Azman Adnan 58, Noor Isham Ismail 62, Effendi Malik 66; Cik Hissamudin Hassan 29]

=== Statistic ===
Note:

- Pld = Played, W = Won, D = Drawn, L = Lost, F = Goals for, A = Goals against, Pts= Points, Pos = Position

1st or Champions 2nd or Runner-up 3rd place Promotion Relegation

Season	League									Cup				Asia	
Season	Division	Pld	W	D	L	F	A	Pts	Pos	Charity	Malaysia	FA	Challenge	Competition	Result
2000	Liga Perdana 1	22	10	3	9	32	26	33	6th	—	Runner-up	Quarter-finals	—	—	—

=== Achievement ===
Malaysia Cup = Runner-up

Top Scorer =

== 2001 Negeri Sembilan FA season ==
=== Squad ===
Coach: Mohd Zaki Sheikh Ahmad

Goalkeeper

- (Malaysia) 21. Hamsani Ahmad (25 y/o)
- (Malaysia) 22. Yazid Yassin (26 y/o)
- (Malaysia) Suffian Rahman (23 y/o)

Defender

- (Malaysia) 5. Khairul Anuar Baharom (27 y/o)
- (Malaysia) 12. Leong Hong Seng (26 y/o)
- (Malaysia) 16. Chow Chee Weng (24 y/o)
- (Malaysia) Murugan Elangoo (24 y/o)
- (Malaysia) Norhafiz Zamani Misbah (20 y/o)
- (Malaysia) Ching Hong Aik (28 y/o)

Midfielder

- (Malaysia) 7. Rajan Koran (20 y/o)
- (Malaysia) 11. Syaiful Sabtu (20 y/o)
- (Malaysia) 20. Efendi Abdul Malek (23 y/o)
- (Malaysia) 23. Wong Sai Kong (23 y/o)
- (Malaysia) 25. Shukor Adan (22 y/o)
- (Malaysia) Shahrizam Mohamed (22 y/o)
- (Malaysia) Nazzab Hidzan (26 y/o)

Forward

- (Malaysia) 19. Azman Adnan (30 y/o)
- (Malaysia) Zami Mohd Noor (29 y/o)

=== Kits and sponsors ===
Manufacturer	Sponsor	Home	Away	Third
Line 7	Dunhill			—

=== Competition ===
==== Premier 1 ====
Pos	Team	Pld	W	D	L	GF	GA	GD	Pts	Qualification or relegation
1	Penang FA	22	15	5	2	45	14	+31	50	Champion
2	Terengganu FA	22	12	5	5	37	20	+17	41	
3	Kelantan FA	22	11	5	6	33	21	+12	38	
4	Selangor FA	22	8	10	4	36	22	+14	34	
5	Pahang FA	22	9	5	8	34	29	+5	32	
6	Perlis FA	22	9	4	9	31	21	+10	31	
7	Perak FA	22	8	5	9	38	34	+4	29	
8	Negeri Sembilan FA	22	7	6	9	32	39	−7	27	
9	Sarawak FA	22	5	9	8	19	26	−7	24	
10	Kuala Lumpur FA	22	5	8	9	19	34	−15	23	
11	Malacca FA	22	6	4	12	25	38	−13	22	
12	Johor FA	22	2	4	16	13	54	−41	10	Relegated to Liga Perdana 2

==== Malaysia Cup ====
Group Stage

Group A

Teams	P	M	S	K	J	B	Point
Negeri Sembilan	6	5	0	1	22	8	15
Selangor	6	1	4	1	8	8	7
Johor FC	6	2	1	3	10	13	7
Kuala Lumpur	6	0	0	6	3	20	0

Knockout Stage

Quarter-final
A1	Negeri Sembilan	1	1	2
C2	Perak	2	3	5
D2	Perlis	1	2	3
B1	Pahang	1	3	4
C1	Terengganu	2	3	5
A2	Selangor	2	1	3
D1	Pulau Pinang	1	1	2(pen,4)
B2	Kelantan	1	1	2(pen,5)

Semi-final
Perak	0	3	3
Pahang	1	0	1
Terengganu	2	1	3
Kelantan	0	1	1

Final
Perak	1
Terengganu	2

==== FA Cup ====
Round 1

N Sembilan 1-0 Kelantan TNB

[Azrine Effendy 59]

Kelantan TNB 2-2 N Sembilan

[Azman Adnan 39, Zami Md Nor 80; Nordin Shukri 84, Shahruddin Mohamed 88]

Round 2

Perak Lintau 0-3 N Sembilan

[Yusafizan Johar 3, 44, Azman Adnan 72]

N Sembilan 1-0 Perak Lintau

[Khairul Anuar Baharom 90]

Quarter-final

Kelantan JKR 2-1 N Sembilan

[Rosairol Asrol Md.Noor 23, Adnan Md.Zin 53; K Rajan 6]

N Sembilan 1-1 Kelantan JKR

[Zool Ihsan Yunus 16; Md Shukor Adan 24]

=== Statistic ===
Note:

- Pld = Played, W = Won, D = Drawn, L = Lost, F = Goals for, A = Goals against, Pts= Points, Pos = Position

1st or Champions 2nd or Runner-up 3rd place Promotion Relegation

Season	League									Cup				Asia	
Season	Division	Pld	W	D	L	F	A	Pts	Pos	Charity	Malaysia	FA	Challenge	Competition	Result
2001	Liga Perdana 1	22	7	6	9	32	39	67	8th	—	3rd round	Quarter-finals	—	—	—

=== Achievement ===
Top Scorer :

== 2002 Negeri Sembilan FA season ==
=== Squad ===
Coach: Mohd Zaki Sheikh Ahmad

Goalkeeper

- (Malaysia) Suffian Rahman (23 y/o)
- (Malaysia) Mohd Hamsani Ahmad (26 y/o)

Defender

- (Malaysia) 5. Khairul Anuar Baharom (28 y/o)
- (Malaysia) 12. Leong Hong Seng (27 y/o)
- (Malaysia) Norhafiz Zamani Misbah (21 y/o)
- (Malaysia) Mohd Rahman Zabul (20 y/o)

Midfielder

- (Malaysia) 7. Rajan Koran (21 y/o)
- (Malaysia) 11. Syaiful Sabtu (21 y/o)
- (Malaysia) 20. Efendi Abdul Malek (24 y/o)
- (Malaysia) Khairil Zainal (28 y/o)
- (Malaysia) Shahrizam Mohamed (23 y/o)

Forward

- (Malaysia) Azmi Mohamed (31 y/o)
- (Malaysia) Zami Mohd Noor (30 y/o)
- (Malaysia) Azrine Effendy Sa'duddin (21 y/o)

=== Kits and sponsors ===
Manufacturer	Sponsor	Home	Away	Third
Line 7	Dunhill			
J-King	Dunhill			

=== Competition ===
==== Premier 1 ====
Pos	Team	Pld	W	D	L	GF	GA	GD	Pts	Qualification or relegation
1	Perak FA	26	19	3	4	42	15	+27	60	Champion
2	Selangor FA	26	17	5	4	43	27	+16	56	
3	Sabah FA	26	13	8	5	48	30	+18	47	
4	Penang FA	26	13	8	5	48	31	+17	47	
5	Terengganu FA	26	12	5	9	36	24	+12	41	
6	Johor FC	26	12	5	9	37	27	+10	41	
7	Perlis FA	26	11	8	7	31	23	+8	41	
8	Sarawak FA	26	8	10	8	40	28	+12	34	
9	Pahang FA	26	8	7	11	43	39	+4	31	
10	Kelantan FA	26	9	3	14	29	41	−12	30	
11	Malacca FA	26	8	3	15	28	48	−20	27	
12	NS Chempaka FC	26	4	7	15	21	50	−29	19	
13	Kuala Lumpur FA	26	4	4	18	21	48	−27	16	Relegated to Liga Perdana 2
14	Negeri Sembilan FA	26	4	4	18	25	61	−36	16	Relegated to Liga Perdana 2

Source: rsssf.com

==== FA Cup ====
Round 1

Negeri Sembilan 1-0 Armed Forces

[Azrine Efendy 57]

Armed Forces 1-0 Negeri Sembilan [agg 1-1; aet; Negeri Sembilan 6-5 pens]

[Ahmad Nizam Ariffin 85pen]

Round 2

Pahang 3-2 Negeri Sembilan

[Azmani Kadir 5, Shahruddin Rosdi 32, Jalaluddin Jaafar 71; Effendi Malek 9, 63]

Negeri Sembilan 3-1 Pahang [agg 5–4; aet]

[Azmi Mohamed 59, Norhafiz Zamani Misbah 75, Zami Mohd Noor 92 - Juzaili Samion 22]

Quarter-final

Negeri Sembilan 0-3 Penang

[Norhafiz Zamani Misbah 48(OG), Chee Wan Hoe 61, Anuar Abu Bakar 84]

Penang 3-0 Negeri Sembilan [agg 6-0]

[Gustavo Romero 6, Zool Ihsan Yunus 15, S.Sutesh 90]

=== Statistic ===
Note:

- Pld = Played, W = Won, D = Drawn, L = Lost, F = Goals for, A = Goals against, Pts= Points, Pos = Position

1st or Champions 2nd or Runner-up 3rd place Promotion Relegation

Season	League									Cup				Asia	
Season	Division	Pld	W	D	L	F	A	Pts	Pos	Charity	Malaysia	FA	Challenge	Competition	Result
2002	Liga Perdana 1	26	4	4	18	25	61	16	14th	—	—	2nd round	—	—	—

=== Achievement ===
League top Scorer : (Malaysia) K. Rajan (8 goals)

All top Scorer : (Malaysia) K. Rajan (8 goals)

== 2003 Negeri Sembilan FA season ==
=== Squad ===
Coach: K. Devan

Goalkeeper

- (Malaysia) 1. Azlisham Ibrahim (30 y/o)
- (Malaysia) 22. Suffian Rahman (24 y/o)

Defender

- (Malaysia) 5. Khairul Anuar Baharom (29 y/o)
- (Malaysia) 7. B. Rajinikandh (29 y/o)
- (Malaysia) 12. Lim Chan Yew (25 y/o)
- (Malaysia) 13. Anuar Jusoh (31 y/o)
- (Malaysia) 24. Norhafiz Zamani Misbah (21 y/o)
- (Malaysia) Yosri Derma Raju (21 y/o)
- (Malaysia) Redzuan Mohd Radzy (22 y/o)
- (Malaysia) Mohd Rahman Zabul (21 y/o)
- (Malaysia) Ching Hong Aik (30 y/o)

Midfielder

- (Argentina) 10. Luciano Osmar (25 y/o)
- (Malaysia) 11. Syaiful Sabtu (22 y/o)
- (Malaysia) 17. Shahrizam Mohamed (24 y/o)
- (Malaysia) 25. Rajan Koran (22 y/o)
- (Malaysia) Mohd Aiman Wong
- (Malaysia) Suharmin Yusuf

Forward

- (Brazil) 2. Everson Martinelli (25 y/o)
- (Malaysia) 19. Azman Adnan (31 y/o)
- (Malaysia) 20. Efendi Abdul Malek (25 y/o)
- (Malaysia) Azrul Amri Burhan (28 y/o)
- (Malaysia) Azrine Effendy Sa'duddin (22 y/o)

=== Kits and sponsors ===
Manufacturer	Sponsor	Home	Away	Third
J-King	Dunhill			

=== Competition ===
==== Premier 2 ====
League Table:

1.Public Bank - 53 PTS (2003 Liga Perdana 2 Champions)

2.Negeri Sembilan - 42 PTS (Promotion Play-Off) (Stay in the league)

3.Johor - 40 PTS (Promotion Play-Off) (Stay in the league)

4.MPPJ FC - 39 PTS (Promotion Play-Off) (Stay in the league)

5.Brunei - 39 PTS

6.Kuala Lumpur - 31 PTS

7.Kelantan SKMK - 31 PTS

8.PDRM - 28 PTS

9.Kelantan TNB - 24 PTS

10.ATM - 19 PTS

11.Kelantan JPS - 18 PTS

12.Perak TKN - 5 PTS

==== Malaysia Cup ====
Group Stage

Standings P W D L F A Pts

1.Perlis 6 4 2 0 14 6 14 Qualified

2.Sarawak 6 2 3 1 12 8 9 Qualified

3.Melaka Telekom 6 1 2 3 6 8 5

4.Negeri Sembilan 6 1 1 4 5 15 4

==== FA Cup ====
Round 2

First Legs [Mar 12]

Negeri Sembilan 1-1 Pahang

[Azrine Efendy Sa'duddin 86 - Azizol Kamaluddin 36]

Second Legs [Mar 19]

Pahang 1-3 Negeri Sembilan [agg: 2-4]

[Hairuddin Omar 80 - Efendi Malik 15, Luciano Osmar 55, Azman Adnan 65]

Quarter-final

First Legs [Apr 12]

Negeri Sembilan 2-0 Perak

[Everson Martinelli 14, Luciano Osmar 63]

Second Legs [Apr 19]

Perak 1-0 Negeri Sembilan [agg: 1-2]

[Chan Wing Hoong 84]

Semi-final

First Legs [May 10]

Negeri Sembilan 1-0 Sabah

[Efendi Malek 35]

Second Legs [May 17]

Sabah awd Negeri Sembilan [awarded 0–3, agg: 0-4]

[Luciano Gonzalez 74]

[match abandoned at 0-1 after 82 minutes as crowds invaded the pitch]

Final [May 31, Stadium Perak, Ipoh]

Negeri Sembilan 2-1 Perlis [aet; on golden goal]

[Efendi Malik 56, Everson Martinelli 95 - Phillimon Chipeta 11]

=== Statistic ===
Note:

- Pld = Played, W = Won, D = Drawn, L = Lost, F = Goals for, A = Goals against, Pts= Points, Pos = Position

1st or Champions 2nd or Runner-up 3rd place Promotion Relegation

Season	League									Cup				Asia	
Season	Division	Pld	W	D	L	F	A	Pts	Pos	Charity	Malaysia	FA	Challenge	Competition	Result
2003	Liga Perdana 2	22	12	6	4	59	28	42	2nd	—	Group stage	Champions	—	—	—

=== Achievement ===
Premier 2 : Runner-up

FA Cup : Winner

League top scorer : (Malaysia) Azman Adnan (9 goals)

All top scorer : (Malaysia) Azman Adnan (16 goals)

== 2004 Negeri Sembilan FA season ==
=== Squad ===
Coach: K. Devan

Goalkeeper

- (Malaysia) 21. Azizon Abdul Kadir (24 y/o)
- (Nigeria) 1. Cajetan Ndubuisi Oparaugo
- (Malaysia) Suffian Rahman (25 y/o)

Defender

- (Malaysia) 5. Khairul Anuar Baharom (30 y/o)
- (Malaysia) 7. B. Rajinikandh (30 y/o)
- (Malaysia) 15. Ching Hong Aik (31 y/o)
- (Malaysia) Yosri Derma Raju (22 y/o)
- (Malaysia) 24. Norhafiz Zamani Misbah (22 y/o)
- (Malaysia) 2. Mohd Rahman Zabul (22 y/o)
- (Malaysia) 23. K. Sathian (22 y/o)
- (Malaysia) 16. P. Sivanathan

Midfielder

- (Malaysia) 11. Syaiful Sabtu (23 y/o)
- (Malaysia) 13. Anuar Jusoh (32 y/o)
- (Malaysia) 10. Rajan Koran (22 y/o)
- (Malaysia) 17. Shahrizam Mohamed (25 y/o)
- (Malaysia) Syamsol Sabtu (19 y/o)
- (Malaysia) 20. Efendi Abdul Malek (26 y/o)
- (Malaysia) 12. Shahrin Abdul Majid (35 y/o)
- (Malaysia) 9. Suharmin Yusuf

Forward

- (Nigeria) 19. Alfred Effiong (20 y/o)
- (Cameroon) Christian Bekamenga (18 y/o)
- (Nigeria) 18. Abdulrazak Ekpoki (22 y/o)
- (Malaysia) Mohd Farid Ideris (22 y/o)
- (Malaysia) Azrul Amri Burhan (29 y/o)
- (Malaysia) Mohd Fairuz Ezwan
- (Malaysia) Azrine Effendy Sa'duddin (23 y/o)

=== Kits and sponsors ===
Manufacturer	Sponsor	Home	Away	Third
J-King	Dunhill			

=== Competition ===
==== Premier League ====
Group B

Pos	Team	Pld	W	D	L	GF	GA	GD	Pts	Qualification or relegation
1	(Selangor) MPPJ	24	13	6	5	49	28	+21	45	Champion
2	(Selangor) MK Land	24	13	3	8	42	31	+11	42	
3	Kuala Lumpur	24	10	8	6	44	33	+11	38	
4	Negeri Sembilan	24	10	8	6	45	35	+10	38	
5	Terengganu	24	8	11	5	33	27	+6	35	
6	Johor	24	8	8	8	30	31	−1	32	
7	Malacca	24	6	9	9	32	38	−6	27	
8	(Kelantan) SKMK	24	8	2	14	24	47	−23	26	
9	Kelantan	24	1	7	16	13	42	−29	10	Relegated to Liga FAM

==== Malaysia Cup ====
Group B

Teams	P	M	S	K	J	B	Point
(Penang) Pulau Pinang FA	6	4	0	2	13	10	12
Negeri Sembilan FA	6	3	1	2	7	8	10
Perak FA	6	3	0	3	8	4	9
Selangor MPPJ FC	6	1	1	4	6	12	4

Knockout Stage

Quarter-final
A1	Kedah	0	3	3
C2	Selangor Public Bank	2	0	2
D2	Sabah	1	2	3
B1	(Penang) Pulau Pinang	0	1	1
A2	Pahang	1	2	3
C1	Selangor	1	0	1
B2	Negeri Sembilan	3	0	3 (4)
D1	Perlis	2	1	3 (5)

Semi-final
Kedah	0	1	1
Sabah	0	0	0
Pahang	0	2	2
Perlis	2	1	3

Final
Kedah	0
Perlis	1

==== FA Cup ====
Second Round

Kelantan TNB	0-1	Negeri Sembilan
Negeri Sembilan	5-1	Kelantan TNB

Third Round

Melaka	2-2	Negeri Sembilan
Negeri Sembilan	3-1	Melaka

Quarter-final

Negeri Sembilan	3-2	Perak
Perak	6-0	Negeri Sembilan

==== AFC Cup ====
Qualification

ASEAN
Malaysia (2)	Perak (2003 Malaysia Premier 1 League champions) Negeri Sembilan (2003 Malaysia FA Cup winners)

Group stageGroup E

Team	Pld	W	D	L	GF	GA	GD	Pts
(India) East Bengal	6	4	1	1	14	8	+6	13
(Singapore) Geylang United	6	4	1	1	12	5	+7	13
(Malaysia) Negeri Sembilan	6	2	0	4	11	9	+2	6
(Maldives) Island FC	6	1	0	5	2	17	−15	3

Source: AFC Cup 2004
10 February 2004

Negeri Sembilan (Malaysia)	6–0	(Maldives) Island FC
Effiong 19', 64', 71'; Ekpoki 30', 90'; K. Rajan 28'	Report

Perak Stadium, Ipoh
Attendance: 1,500
Referee: Mukhtar Al Yarimi (Yemen)

25 February 2004

East Bengal (India)	4–2	(Malaysia) Negeri Sembilan
Okoro 9'; Junior 34' (pen.), 70'; Bhutia 77'	Report	K. Rajan 45'; Shahrin 64'

Salt Lake Stadium, Kolkata
Referee: C Win

7 April 2004

Negeri Sembilan (Malaysia)	0–1	(Singapore) Geylang United
	Report	Duric 10'

Mong Kok Stadium, Hong Kong
Attendance: 200
Referee: Atallah Al Enezi (Kuwait)

21 April 2004

Geylang United (Singapore)	2–1	(Malaysia) Negeri Sembilan
Chang Hui 49'; Duric 71'	Report	Efendi 27'

Hàng Đẫy Stadium, Hanoi (Vietnam)
Attendance: 500
Referee: Tan Hai (China)

4 May 2004

Island FC (Maldives)	1–0	(Malaysia) Negeri Sembilan
Mohamed 14'	Report

Hàng Đẫy Stadium, Hanoi (Vietnam)
Attendance: 3,000
Referee: Ram Krishna Ghosh (Bangladesh)

18 May 2004

Negeri Sembilan (Malaysia)	2–1	(India) East Bengal
Suharmin 23', 49'	Report	Junior 24'

Mong Kok Stadium, Hong Kong
Attendance: 208
Referee: S Tongkhan

=== Statistic ===
Note:

- Pld = Played, W = Won, D = Drawn, L = Lost, F = Goals for, A = Goals against, Pts= Points, Pos = Position

1st or Champions 2nd or Runner-up 3rd place Promotion Relegation

Season	League									Cup				Asia	
Season	Division	Pld	W	D	L	F	A	Pts	Pos	Charity	Malaysia	FA	Challenge	Competition	Result
2004	Premier League	24	10	8	6	45	35	38	4th	Runner-up	Quarter-finals	Quarter-finals	—	AFC Cup	Group stage

=== Achievement ===
AFC Cup: Group stage

League top scorer: (Malaysia) Shahrin Abdul Majid (11 goals)

All top scorer: (Malaysia) Efendi Abdul Malek (12 goals)

== 2005 Negeri Sembilan FA season ==
=== Squad ===
Coach: K. Devan

Goalkeeper

- (Malaysia) 21. Azizon Abdul Kadir (25 y/o)
- (Malaysia) 22. Suffian Rahman (26 y/o)

Defender

- (Malaysia) 5. Khairul Anuar Baharom (31 y/o)
- (Malaysia) 7. B. Rajinikandh (31 y/o)
- (Malaysia) 13. Anuar Jusoh (33 y/o)
- (Malaysia) 15. Ching Hong Aik (32 y/o)
- (Malaysia) 25. P. Sivanathan
- (Malaysia) Yosri Derma Raju (23 y/o)
- (Malaysia) Syamsol Sabtu (20 y/o)
- (Malaysia) Aidil Zafuan (18 y/o)
- (Malaysia) 2. Mohd Rahman Zabul (23 y/o)
- (Malaysia) 12. K. Sathian (23 y/o)

Midfielder

- (Nigeria) 6. Lateef Seriki (26 y/o)
- (Malaysia) 8. Idris Abdul Karim (29 y/o)
- (Malaysia) 16. Rajan Koran (23 y/o)
- (Malaysia) 17. Shahrizam Mohamed (26 y/o)
- (Malaysia) 23. Rezal Zambery Yahya (27 y/o)
- (Malaysia) K. Thanaraj (19 y/o)
- (Malaysia) 14. Khaidir Mohd Dom

Forward

- (Cameroon) 10. Christian Bekamenga (19 y/o)
- (Malaysia) 11. Che Hishamuddin Hassan (30 y/o)
- (Malaysia) Zaquan Adha (18 y/o)
- (Malaysia) Mohd Nizaruddin Yusof (26 y/o)
- (Cameroon) Anicet Eyenga (19 y/o)
- (Malaysia) Azrine Effendy Sa'duddin (24 y/o)

=== Kits and sponsors ===
Manufacturer	Sponsor	Home	Away	Third
Lotto	TM Net			

=== Competition ===
==== Premier League ====
Group B

Pos	Team	Pld	W	D	L	GF	GA	GD	Pts	Qualification or relegation
1	Negeri Sembilan (P)	21	16	1	4	45	19	+26	49	Promotion to Super League and final round
2	Terengganu	21	13	4	4	34	18	+16	43	
3	PKNS	21	13	2	6	46	25	+21	41	
4	Johor FC	21	10	6	5	27	16	+11	36	
5	UPB Jendarata	21	7	5	9	20	32	−12	26	
6	Johor	21	6	2	13	18	29	−11	20	
7	Sarawak	21	3	5	13	23	38	−15	14	
8	PDRM	21	2	3	16	15	51	−36	9	

Source: RSSSF
Rules for classification: 1) Points; 2) Goal difference; 3) Number of goals scored.
(P) Promoted

Final

23 July 2005
20:15 UTC+8

Negeri Sembilan	2–4	Selangor
Anuar Jusoh 15'; Idris Karim 53'	Report	Brian Fuentes 79'; K. Sanbagamaran 90'; D. Surendran 118'; Bambang Pamungkas 119'

Tuanku Abdul Rahman Stadium, Seremban, Negeri Sembilan

==== Malaysia Cup ====
Group B

Teams	P	M	S	K	J	B	Point
Telekom Melaka	6	2	2	2	7	6	8
Pulau Pinang	6	2	2	2	8	7	8
Negeri Sembilan	6	1	4	1	7	7	7
Kuala Lumpur	6	1	4	1	7	8	7

==== FA Cup ====
First round

Negeri Sembilan	0-3	Kedah
Kedah	1-0	Negeri Sembilan

=== Statistic ===
Note:

- Pld = Played, W = Won, D = Drawn, L = Lost, F = Goals for, A = Goals against, Pts= Points, Pos = Position

1st or Champions 2nd or Runner-up 3rd place Promotion Relegation

Season	League									Cup				Asia	
Season	Division	Pld	W	D	L	F	A	Pts	Pos	Charity	Malaysia	FA	Challenge	Competition	Result
2005	Premier League	21	16	1	4	45	19	49	1st	—	Group stage	1st round	—	—	—

=== Achievement ===
Premier League: Winner

Top Scorer: (Cameroon) Christian Bekamenga (League: 16 goals, All: 21 goals)

== 2005–06 Negeri Sembilan Naza season ==
=== Squad ===
Coach: K. Devan

Goalkeeper

- (Malaysia) 21. Azizon Abdul Kadir (26 y/o)
- (Malaysia) Afendi Kamsah (32 y/o)

Defender

- (Australia) 3. Jason Williams (26 y/o)
- (Malaysia) 5. Khairul Anuar Baharom (32 y/o)
- (Malaysia) 6. Bakhtiar Othman (31 y/o)
- (Malaysia) 7. Aidil Zafuan (19 y/o)
- (Malaysia) 15. Ching Hong Aik (33 y/o)
- (Malaysia) 25. P. Sivanathan
- (Malaysia) Yosri Derma Raju (24 y/o)
- (Malaysia) Mohd Nidzam Jamil (26 y/o)
- (Malaysia) Syamsol Sabtu (21 y/o)
- (Malaysia) 2. Mohd Rahman Zabul (24 y/o)
- (Malaysia) 12. K. Sathian (24 y/o)

Midfielder

- (Malaysia) 8. Idris Abdul Karim (30 y/o)
- (Malaysia) 13. Anuar Jusoh (34 y/o)
- (Malaysia) 17. Shahrizam Mohamed (27 y/o)
- (Zambia) 18. Noel Rodwell Mwandila (24 y/o)
- (Malaysia) 23. Rezal Zambery Yahya (28 y/o)
- (Malaysia) 25. K. Thanaraj (20 y/o)
- (Malaysia) Ghazali Abdul Rashid

Forward

- (Cameroon) 10. Christian Bekamenga (20 y/o)
- (Malaysia) 11. Che Hisamuddin Hassan (31 y/o)
- (Liberia) 19. Buston Nagbe Browne (21 y/o)
- (Saint Vincent and the Grenadines) Shandel Samuel (24 y/o)
- (Malaysia) Mohd Nizaruddin Yusof (27 y/o)
- (Malaysia) Zaquan Adha (19 y/o)
- (Malaysia) Azrine Effendy Sa'duddin (25 y/o)

=== Kits and sponsors ===
Manufacturer	Sponsor	Home	Away	Third
Lotto	TM / Naza	Note (Note: Home kit for early 2005–06 season)	Note (Note: Away kit for early 2005–06 season)	

=== Competition ===
==== Super League ====
League table

Pos	Team	Pld	W	D	L	GF	GA	GD	Pts	Qualification or relegation
1	Negeri Sembilan (C)	21	12	4	5	26	14	+12	40	Qualification to AFC Cup group stage
2	TM Melaka	21	9	6	6	31	46	−15	33	
3	Perak	21	9	3	9	32	29	+3	30	
4	Perlis	21	8	6	7	26	25	+1	30	
5	MPPJ	21	9	2	10	28	27	+1	29	
6	Penang	21	8	4	9	30	31	−1	28	
7	Pahang	21	7	6	8	21	24	−3	27	Qualification for the AFC Cup group stage and relegation play-offs (Note: Pahang qualified for the AFC Cup group stage as the Malaysia FA Cup winners.)
8	Selangor	21	5	3	13	31	46	−15	18	Qualification to relegation play-offs

Source: RSSSF
Rules for classification: 1) Points; 2) Goal difference; 3) Number of goals scored.
(C) Champions

==== Malaysia Cup ====
Group A

Team	Pld	W	D	L	F	A	Pts
Negeri Sembilan Naza	6	3	2	1	13	8	11
Terengganu	6	3	1	2	12	8	10
Selangor	6	3	1	2	9	7	10
Sabah	6	1	0	5	2	3	3

Knockout Stage

Quarter-final
A1	Negeri Sembilan	1	2	3(pen,5)
C2	Sarawak	1	2	3(pen,4)
B1	Telekom Melaka	3	2	5
D2	MPPJ	0	0	0
C1	Perlis	3	1	4
A2	Terengganu	2	1	3
D1	Perak	3	2	5
B2	Pulau Pinang	0	2	5

Semi-final
Negeri Sembilan	1	2	3
Telekom Melaka	1	0	1
Perlis	0	2	2
Perak	0	1	1

Final
Negeri Sembilan	1
Perlis	2

==== FA Cup ====
First round

NS Naza	5-1	SAJ
SAJ	1-4	NS Naza

Second round

Telekom Melaka	0-3	NS Naza
NS Naza	1-1	TM Melaka

Quarter-final

1st leg

5 April 2006
20:45

Terengganu	0 – 0	NS Naza

2nd leh

19 April 2006
20:45

NS Naza	2 – 1	Terengganu
Cik Hisamudin Hasan 66'; Anuar Jusoh 112th 90+22'		78' Fabio Flor

Semi-final 1st leg

29 April 2006
20:45

NS Naza	0 – 0	Pahang

2nd leg

13 May 2006
20:45

Pahang	3 – 2	NS Naza
James Mitchell 12'; Fadzli Saari 43'; Subri Sulong 82'		72' M. Sathian; 75' Christian Bekamenga

=== Statistic ===
Note:

- Pld = Played, W = Won, D = Drawn, L = Lost, F = Goals for, A = Goals against, Pts= Points, Pos = Position

1st or Champions 2nd or Runner-up 3rd place Promotion Relegation

Season	League									Cup				Asia	
Season	Division	Pld	W	D	L	F	A	Pts	Pos	Charity	Malaysia	FA	Challenge	Competition	Result
2005–06	Super League	21	12	4	5	26	14	40	1st	—	Runner-up	Semi-finals	—	—	—

=== Achievement ===
Super League: Winner

Malaysia Cup: Runner-up

Top scorer: (Cameroon) Christian Bekamenga (League: 8 goals, All: 19 goals)

== 2006–07 Negeri Sembilan Naza season ==
=== Squad ===
Coach: (Tunisia) Hatem Souissi

Goalkeeper

- (Malaysia) 1. Yazid Yassin (32 y/o)
- (Malaysia) 21. Azizon Abdul Kadir (27 y/o)
- (Malaysia) 30. Farizal Harun (21 y/o)

Defender

- (Malaysia) 2. Mohd Rahman Zabul (25 y/o)
- (Australia) 3. Jason Williams (26 y/o)
- (Malaysia) 4. Mohd Affandy Adimel (21 y/o)
- (Malaysia) 5. Khairul Anuar Baharom (33 y/o)
- (Slovakia) 5. Marián Juhás (28 y/o)
- (Malaysia) 6. Mohd Nidzam Jamil (27 y/o)
- (Malaysia) 7. Aidil Zafuan (20 y/o)
- (Malaysia) 11. Syamsol Sabtu (22 y/o)
- (Malaysia) 12. Abdullah Sani Yusof
- (Malaysia) 15. Ching Hong Aik (34 y/o)
- (Malaysia) 24. Tengku Qayyum (21 y/o)
- (Malaysia) 29. Qhairul Anwar Roslani (20 y/o)

Midfielder

- (Malaysia) 6. S. Kunanlan (21 y/o)
- (Malaysia) 8. Idris Abdul Karim (31 y/o)
- (Malaysia) 9. Shahurain Abu Samah (21 y/o)
- (Malaysia) 13. Mohd Anuar Jusoh (35 y/o)
- (Malaysia) 17. Shahrizam Mohamed (28 y/o)
- (Malaysia) 20. Norshahrul Idlan Talaha (21 y/o)
- (Malaysia) 23. Rezal Zambery Yahya (29 y/o)
- (Malaysia) 25. K. Thanaraj (21 y/o)
- (Malaysia) 26. Abdul Halim Zainal (19 y/o)
- (Malaysia) Muhd Arif Ismail (21 y/o)
- (Malaysia) Efendi Abdul Malek (29 y/o)
- (Netherlands) Pascal Heije (28 y/o)
- (Nigeria) Julius Ejueyitsi (23 y/o)
- (Argentina) Raul Daniel Cojan

Forward

- (Malaysia) 10. Liew Kit Kong (28 y/o)
- (Malaysia) 14. Zaquan Adha (20 y/o)
- (Malaysia) 16. Mohd Hafiz Syobri (28 y/o)
- (Angola) 18. Freddy (28 y/o)
- (Liberia) Buston Nagbe Browne (22 y/o)
- (Czech Republic) Vítězslav Mooc (29 y/o)
- (Kenya) Eric Muranda (25 y/o)

=== Kits and sponsors ===
Manufacturer	Sponsor	Home	Away	Third
Lotto	TM / Naza	Note (Note: Home kit for early 2006–07 season)	Note (Note: Away kit for early 2006–07 season)	
Kappa	TM / Naza			

=== Competition ===
==== Super League ====
League table The final league table after the final matches of the season on 4 August 2007.

Pos	Team	Pld	W	D	L	GF	GA	GD	Pts	Qualification or relegation
1	Kedah	24	17	4	3	54	21	+33	55	Champion
2	Perak	24	16	5	3	58	22	+36	53	
3	(Brunei) DPMM	24	13	5	6	46	29	+17	44	
4	Terengganu	24	13	5	6	41	29	+12	44	
5	Perlis	24	13	4	7	47	25	+22	43	
6	Johor FC	24	11	6	7	35	26	+9	39	
7	(Malacca) TM	24	10	6	8	34	33	+1	36	
8	Selangor	24	8	4	12	27	36	−9	28	
9	Pahang	24	7	6	11	32	41	−9	27	
10	Penang	24	6	6	12	25	36	−11	24	
11	Negeri Sembilan	24	6	6	12	29	46	−17	24	
12	Sarawak	24	2	4	18	28	65	−37	10	
13	Malacca	24	2	3	19	24	72	−48	9	Relegated to Liga Premier

==== Malaysia Cup ====
Group B

Team	Pld	W	D	L	GF	GA	GD	Pts
Negeri Sembilan	10	6	3	1	19	8	+14	21
Melaka	10	6	1	3	19	13	+9	19
Terengganu	10	5	2	3	23	12	+1	17
Kelantan	10	4	4	2	15	11	-25	16
Pulau Pinang	10	2	2	6	10	19	-25	8
Angkatan Tentera Malaysia	10	0	2	8	7	30	-25	2

Knockout stage

Quarter-final
A1	Selangor	2	0	2
B3	Terengganu	2	1	3
B2	Melaka	1	0	1
C1	Kedah	6	4	10
B1	Negeri Sembilan	1	1	2
C3	Sabah	0	3	3
A2	Perlis	2	1	3
C2	Perak	0	5	5

Semi-final
Kedah	0	2	2
Terengganu	0	0	0
Perak	1	2	3
Sabah	1	1	2

Final
Kedah	3
Perak	0

==== FA Cup ====
First round

Negeri Sembilan FA	0–0 (6–5 on penalties)	PDRM FA

Second round

UPB-MyTeam FC	3–1	Negeri Sembilan FA

==== AFC Cup ====
Qualification

South East Asia
Malaysia (2)	Negeri Sembilan FA (2005–06 Super League Malaysia champions) Pahang FA (2006 Malaysia FA Cup winners)

Group Stage

Group D

Team	Pld	W	D	L	GF	GA	GD	Pts
(Hong Kong) Sun Hei	6	5	0	1	15	6	+9	15
(Malaysia) Negeri Sembilan FA	6	1	4	1	4	5	−1	7
(Maldives) Victory SC	6	1	3	2	7	9	−2	6
(Vietnam) Hoa Phat Hanoi	6	0	3	3	7	13	−6	3

6 March 2007

Negeri Sembilan FA	0–0	Hoa Phat Hanoi
	(Report)

Tuanku Abdul Rahman Stadium, Seremban, Malaysia
Attendance: 1,500
Referee: (Yemen) Mukhtar Al Yarimi

20 March 2007

Victory SC	2–2	Negeri Sembilan FA
Ashad Ali 7'; Izzath Abdul Baree 22'	(Report)	Freddy 17' 90+4'

National Stadium, Malé, Maldives
Attendance: 8,000
Referee: (India) Subrata Sarkar

10 April 2007

Sun Hei	2–0	Negeri Sembilan FA
Victor 6' 69'	(Report)

Mong Kok Stadium, Hong Kong
Attendance: 200
Referee: (Kuwait) Atallah Jatli Al-Enezi

24 April 2007

Negeri Sembilan FA	1–0	Sun Hei
Freddy 88'	(Report)

Tuanku Abdul Rahman Stadium, Seremban, Malaysia
Attendance: 1,100
Referee: (United Arab Emirates) Ali Hamad Al-Badwawi

8 May 2007

Hoa Phat Hanoi	0–0	Negeri Sembilan FA
	(Report)

Hàng Đẫy Stadium, Hanoi, Vietnam
Attendance: 3,000
Referee: (Bangladesh) Ram Krishna Gosh

22 May 2007

Negeri Sembilan FA	1–1	Victory SC
Shahrizam Mohd 45'	(Report)	Mohamed Shaffaz 22'

Tuanku Abdul Rahman Stadium, Seremban, Malaysia
Attendance: 600
Referee: (Lebanon) Mohamad Mansour

=== Statistic ===
Note:

- Pld = Played, W = Won, D = Drawn, L = Lost, F = Goals for, A = Goals against, Pts= Points, Pos = Position

1st or Champions 2nd or Runner-up 3rd place Promotion Relegation

Season	League									Cup				Asia	
Season	Division	Pld	W	D	L	F	A	Pts	Pos	Charity	Malaysia	FA	Challenge	Competition	Result
2006–07	Super League	24	6	6	12	29	46	24	11th	—	Quarter-finals	2nd round	—	AFC Cup	Group stage

=== Achievement ===
AFC Cup: Group stage

Top scorer: (Angola) Freddy (League: 9 goals, All: 13 goals)

== 2007–08 Negeri Sembilan Naza season ==
=== Squad ===
Coach: Wan Jamak Wan Hassan

Goalkeeper

- (Malaysia) 1. Yazid Yassin (33 y/o)
- (Malaysia) 22. Farizal Harun (22 y/o)

Defender

- (Malaysia) 2. Mohd Rahman Zabul (26 y/o)
- (Australia) 3. Jason Williams (28 y/o)
- (Slovakia) 28. Marián Juhás (29 y/o)
- (Malaysia) 7. Aidil Zafuan (21 y/o)
- (Malaysia) 11. Syamsol Sabtu (23 y/o)
- (Malaysia) 15. Ching Hong Aik (35 y/o)
- (Malaysia) Qhairul Anwar Roslani (21 y/o)
- (Malaysia) Tengku Qayyum Tengku Ahmad (22 y/o)

Midfielder

- (Malaysia) 6. S. Kunanlan (22 y/o)
- (Malaysia) 9. Shahurain (22 y/o)
- (Malaysia) 8. Idris Abdul Karim (32 y/o)
- (Malaysia) 20. Abdul Halim Zainal (20 y/o)
- (Malaysia) 23. Rezal Zambery Yahya (30 y/o)
- (Sierra Leone) 3. Lamin Conteh (32 y/o)
- (Malaysia) 17. K. Thanaraj (22 y/o)
- (Malaysia) Efendi Abdul Malek (30 y/o)
- (Malaysia) Muhd Arif Ismail (22 y/o)
- (Malaysia) Mohd Shaffik Abdul Rahman (24 y/o)

Forward

- (Malaysia) 8. Zaquan Adha (21 y/o)
- (Nigeria) 10. Udo Fortune (20 y/o)

=== Kits and sponsors ===
Manufacturer	Sponsor	Home	Away	Third
Kappa	TM / Naza			

=== Competition ===
==== Super League ====
League table

Pos	Team	Pld	W	D	L	GF	GA	GD	Pts	Qualification or relegation
1	Kedah	24	18	2	4	55	24	+31	56	Champion
2	Negeri Sembilan	24	14	6	4	48	30	+18	48	
3	Johor FC	24	14	4	6	40	27	+13	46	
4	Selangor	24	14	3	7	46	36	+10	45	
5	Perak	24	13	2	9	46	34	+12	41	
6	Terengganu	24	10	7	7	41	31	+10	37	
7	Perlis	24	10	6	8	36	25	+11	36	
8	Pahang	24	8	6	10	26	31	−5	30	
9	(Malaysia) PDRM	24	7	3	14	30	52	−22	24	
10	(Brunei) DPMM	24	4	10	10	27	34	−7	22	
11	(Malaysia) UPB-MyTeam	24	6	4	14	30	40	−10	22	
12	Penang	24	4	5	15	30	49	−19	17	
13	Sarawak	24	4	2	18	25	67	−42	14	Relegated to Liga Premier

==== Malaysia Cup ====
Group stage

Group A

Rk.	Team	P	W	D	L	F	A	GD	Pts
1.	Selangor	10	8	1	1	29	15	14	25
2.	Terengganu	10	6	1	3	18	11	7	19
3.	Negeri Sembilan	10	5	1	4	15	13	2	16
4.	Kelantan	10	4	2	4	17	19	-2	14
5.	Sarawak	10	3	0	7	17	24	-7	9
6.	Melaka	10	1	1	8	13	27	-14	4

==== FA Cup ====
First round

Team 1	Agg.	Team 2	1st leg	2nd leg
Negeri Sembilan FA	1–1^{A}	Johor FA	0–0	1–1

Second round

Team 1	Agg.	Team 2	1st leg	2nd leg
Terengganu FA	5–1	Negeri Sembilan FA	1–0	1–4

=== Statistic ===
Note:

- Pld = Played, W = Won, D = Drawn, L = Lost, F = Goals for, A = Goals against, Pts= Points, Pos = Position

1st or Champions 2nd or Runner-up 3rd place Promotion Relegation

Season	League									Cup				Asia	
Season	Division	Pld	W	D	L	F	A	Pts	Pos	Charity	Malaysia	FA	Challenge	Competition	Result
2007–08	Super League	24	14	6	4	48	30	48	2nd	—	Group stage	2nd round	—	—	—

=== Achievement ===
Malaysia Super League: Runner-up

Top scorer: Zaquan Adha (League: 11 goals, All: 14 goals)

== 2009 Negeri Sembilan FA season ==
=== Squad ===
Coach: Wan Jamak Wan Hassan

Goalkeeper

- (Malaysia) 21. Sani Anuar Kamsani (26 y/o)
- (Malaysia) 22. Farizal Harun (23 y/o)
- (Malaysia) Khairul Ketuhar

Defender

- (Malaysia) 2. Mohd Rahman Zabul (27 y/o)
- (Malaysia) 3. Khairul Azwan
- (Malaysia) 4. Affandy Adimel (23 y/o)
- (Malaysia) 5. Muhd Arif Ismail (23 y/o)
- (Malaysia) 7. Aidil Zafuan (22 y/o)
- (Malaysia) 11. Syamsol Sabtu (24 y/o)
- (Malaysia) 15. Ching Hong Aik (36 y/o)
- (Malaysia) 18. Arulchelvan Illenggo (23 y/o)
- (Malaysia) 24. Mohd Syukri Ismail (23 y/o)
- (Malaysia) 25. Tengku Qayyum (23 y/o)
- (Malaysia) 29. Alif Samsudin (20 y/o)
- (Malaysia) 30. P. Kesavan (23 y/o)
- (Malaysia) Qhairul Anwar Roslani (22 y/o)

Midfielder

- (Malaysia) 6. S. Kunanlan (23 y/o)
- (Malaysia) 9. Shahurain Abu Samah (23 y/o)
- (Malaysia) 12. Shukor Adan (30 y/o)
- (Malaysia) 14. K. Thanaraj (23 y/o)
- (Malaysia) 17. Idris Abdul Karim (33 y/o)
- (Malaysia) 19. Muhd Afify Khusli
- (Malaysia) 20. Abdul Halim Zainal (21 y/o)
- (Malaysia) 23. Rezal Zambery Yahya (31 y/o)
- (Malaysia) 28. Asyraf Al-Japri (19 y/o)
- (Malaysia) 31. V. Parameswaran (22 y/o)
- (Malaysia) Efendi Abdul Malek (31 y/o)
- (Malaysia) 16. Mohd Shaffik Abdul Rahman (25 y/o)

Forward

- (Malaysia) 8. Zaquan Adha (22 y/o)
- (Malaysia) 10. K. Ravindran (20 y/o)
- (Malaysia) 13. Mohd Faiz Mohd Isa (23 y/o)
- (Malaysia) 26. Firdaus Azizul (21 y/o)
- (Malaysia) 27. Hairuddin Omar (30 y/o)

=== Kits and sponsors ===
Manufacturer	Sponsor	Home	Away	Third
Kappa	TM			

=== Competition ===
==== Super League ====
League table

Pos	Team	Pld	W	D	L	GF	GA	GD	Pts	Qualification or relegation
1	Selangor (C)	26	20	3	3	64	21	+43	63	Champion / League leaders
2	Perlis	26	17	5	4	40	19	+21	56	
3	Kedah	26	16	3	7	45	28	+17	51	
4	Johor FC	26	15	3	8	53	27	+26	48	
5	Terengganu	26	15	2	9	46	29	+17	47	
6	Kelantan	26	14	2	10	49	36	+13	44	
7	Negeri Sembilan	26	11	5	10	44	35	+9	38	
8	PLUS	26	11	5	10	35	26	+9	38	
9	Kuala Muda Naza	26	12	1	13	32	41	−9	37	Withdraw from league (Note: Kuala Muda Naza and UPB-MyTeam withdrew before the start of 2010 season.)
10	Perak	26	9	5	12	27	36	−9	32	
11	UPB-MyTeam	26	9	3	14	28	49	−21	30	Withdraw from league
12	Penang	26	5	4	17	29	55	−26	19	
13	Pahang	26	5	2	19	31	62	−31	17	
14	PDRM (R)	26	0	3	23	19	75	−56	3	Relegated to Liga Premier

Source: Results TM Liga Super and Rec.Sport.Soccer Statistics Foundation
(C) Champions; (R) Relegated

==== Malaysia Cup ====
Group B

Pos	Team	Pld	W	D	L	GF	GA	GD	Pts
1	Negeri Sembilan (Q)	6	6	0	0	15	1	+14	18
2	Terengganu (Q)	6	4	0	2	14	5	+9	12
3	Johor	6	2	0	4	12	11	+1	6
4	Sarawak	6	0	0	6	1	26	−25	0

(Q) Qualified to quarterfinals

Knockout stage

Quarterfinals
A1	KL Plus	1	0	1
E1	Kelantan	1	3	4
C1	Johor FC	1	0	1
A2	Perlis	2	2	4
B1	Negeri Sembilan	2	3	3
D2	Sabah FA	0	2	2
D1	Selangor	1	1	2 (4)
B2	Terengganu	1	1	2 (5)

Semifinals
Kelantan	2	3	5
Perlis	0	1	1
Negeri Sembilan	1	3	4
Terengganu	0	1	1

Final
Kelantan	1
Negeri Sembilan	3

Final

7 November 2009
20:45

Kelantan	1 – 3	Negeri Sembilan
Indra Putra 90+'		Shahurain 18'; Hairuddin 46'; Zaquan Adha 60'

National Stadium, Bukit Jalil, Kuala Lumpur
Attendance: 95,000
Referee: Mohd Yusof Mat Karim (Tentera)

==== FA Cup ====
First round

Team 1	Agg.	Team 2	1st leg	2nd leg
Negeri Sembilan FA	2-1	Malacca FA	0-0	2-1

Second round

Team 1	Agg.	Team 2	1st leg	2nd leg
Penang FA	2-4	Negeri Sembilan FA	1-1	1-3

Quarter-final

1st leg

3 March 2009
20:45

T-Team	0 - 1	Negeri Sembilan
		S. Kunalan 77'

Sultan Ismail Nasiruddin Shah Stadium, Kuala Terengganu

2nd leg

7 March 2009
20:45

Negeri Sembilan	0 - 0	T-Team

Tuanku Abdul Rahman Stadium, Paroi

Semi-final

1st leg

7 April 2009
20:45

Kelantan FA	0 - 1	Negeri Sembilan FA
		Zaquan

Sultan Mohammad IV Stadium, Kota Bharu

2nd leg

18 April 2009
20:45

Negeri Sembilan FA	1 - 2	Kelantan FA

Tuanku Abdul Rahman Stadium, Paroi
Attendance: 30,000

=== Statistic ===
Note:

- Pld = Played, W = Won, D = Drawn, L = Lost, F = Goals for, A = Goals against, Pts= Points, Pos = Position

1st or Champions 2nd or Runner-up 3rd place Promotion Relegation

Season	League									Cup				Asia	
Season	Division	Pld	W	D	L	F	A	Pts	Pos	Charity	Malaysia	FA	Challenge	Competition	Result
2009	Super League	26	11	5	10	44	35	38	7th	—	Champions	Semi-finals	—	—	—

=== Achievement ===
Malaysia Cup: Winner

Top scorer : Zaquan Adha (League: 11 goals, All: 23 goals)
