= List of Sarawak FA international players =

This is a list of past and present Sarawak FA players who have been capped by their country whilst at the club. Third nations have played international selection matches with teams featuring Sarawak FA players.

== Malaysia ==
- Bobby Pian (former Captain Malaysia)
- Efendi Abdul Malek
- Ramos Sari
- Mazlan Wahid
- Mohd Hairol Mokhtar
- Junior Eldstål
- Ronny Harun
- Joseph Kalang Tie
- Sani Anuar Kamsani
- Bobby Gonzales
- Wong Sai Kong
- Ong Kim Swee
- Gilbert Cassidy Gawing
- Mohd Safee Sali
- Mohd Nazri Yunos
- Shamsurin Bin Abdul Rahman
- Bobby Chua

== Indonesia ==
- Kurniawan Dwi Yulianto

== Australia ==
- Alistair Edwards

== Burkina Faso ==
- Romeo Kambou
