= K. Rajan =

K. Rajan may refer to:

- K. Rajan (producer) (1941–2026), Indian film producer and film director
- K. Rajan (politician) (born 1973), Indian politician
- Rajan Koran (born 1981), Malaysian footballer
