= Azrul Amri Burhan =

Malaysian footballer

Azrul Amri
Personal information
- Full name: Azrul Amri bin Burhan
- Date of birth: 1 November 1975 (age 50)
- Place of birth: Kuala Lumpur, Malaysia
- Position: Forward

Youth career
- 1991–1993: Kuala Lumpur FA President Cup

Senior career*
Years	Team	Apps	(Gls)
1994–1996	Kuala Lumpur		
1996–2001	Perak		
2002	TNB Kelantan		
2003–2004	Negeri Sembilan		
2004–2005	TNB Kelantan		

International career^{‡}
1992–1995	Malaysia Olympic		
1996	Malaysia futsal		
- * Club domestic league appearances and goals as of 28 February 2009 ‡ National team caps and goals as of 31 August 2008

Azrul Amri Burhan (born 1 November 1975) is a former Malaysian footballer. He was described as the 'next Azizol'.

== Career ==
He played with Kuala Lumpur FA and Perak FA during his heyday, where he won two Malaysia Cup with Perak and two Malaysia FA Cup with Kuala Lumpur. He also played with Negeri Sembilan FA and club side TNB Kelantan towards the end of his career.

== National team ==
Azrul has represented the Olympic team, Malaysia (U23). He also played for Malaysia national futsal team and was in the squad that took part in the 1996 FIFA Futsal World Championship in Spain.

His stint with Olympic team was notable, for when he played in the 1995 Toulon Tournament, he received a severe injury when he was tackled by a young David Beckham while playing against England. Thus, he missed the opportunity on trial with france club, Montpellier. The injury, along with his discipline problems, curtailed a promising international future for Azrul who was tipped to be a star midfielder for Malaysia.

== Honours ==
Kuala Lumpur

- Malaysia FA Cup: 1994
- Malaysia Charity Shield: 1995

Perak

- Malaysia Cup: 1998, 2000
- Malaysia Charity Shield: 1999
