= Azrine Effendy Sa'duddin =

Malaysian footballer

Azrine Effendy
Personal information
- Full name: Azrine Effendy bin Sa'duddin
- Date of birth: 7 May 1981 (age 45)
- Place of birth: Negeri Sembilan, Malaysia
- Position: Striker

Team information
- Current team: Betaria FC
- Number: 9

Youth career
- 1999–2001: Negeri Sembilan FA

Senior career*
Years	Team	Apps	(Gls)
2002–2006	Negeri Sembilan FA		
2007–2008	Kuala Lumpur FA		
2009	Johor FA		
2010	Selangor FA		
2011	Sime Darby FC	7	(1)
2012–	Betaria FC		
- * Club domestic league appearances and goals as of 24 May 2011 ‡ National team caps and goals as of 24 May 2011

Azrine Effendy Sa'duddin (born 7 May 1981) is a Malaysian footballer. He currently plays as a striker for Negeri Sembilan-based club Betaria FC.

He formerly played with Selangor FA. He also has played with Johor FA for the 2009 season before moving to Selangor. The other teams that Azrine have played prior to Johor are Kuala Lumpur FA and Negeri Sembilan FA. He played with Sime Darby FC for the 2011 season.

He was a member of Negeri Sembilan's Sukma Games 2006 winning team.

== See also ==
- Football in Malaysia
- List of football clubs in Malaysia
