= Abdulrazak Ekpoki =

Nigerian footballer

Personal information
- Full name: Abdulrazak Mohammed Ekpoki
- Date of birth: 17 October 1982 (age 44)
- Place of birth: Kano, Nigeria
- Height: 1.87 m (6 ft 2 in)
- Position: Striker

Team information
- Current team: NK Rovinj

Senior career*
Years	Team	Apps	(Gls)
1997–1999	Kano Pillars	34	(12)
1999–2001	Plateau United	45	(7)
2001–2003	Ismaily	22	(2)
2004	Negeri Sembilan FA	17	(5)
2004–2005	Ljubljana	24	(10)
2005–2006	Gimnàstic de Tarragona	26	(2)
2006–2007	UD Vecindario	11	(1)
2007–2008	Gorica	23	(14)
2008–2009	KAA Gent	4	(0)
2009–2010	Drava Ptuj	24	(6)
2010	Sông Lam Nghệ An		
2013–	NK Rovinj	1	
- * Club domestic league appearances and goals as of 08:27, 29 September 2009 (UTC)

Abdul Razak Mohammed Ekpoki (born 27 October 1982, in Kano, Nigeria) is a retired Nigerian football retired striker who last played for NK Rovinj.

== Career ==
He started his career in Nigeria playing with Kano Pillars and Plateau United before moving to Egypt in 2000. and winning Egyptian Premier League title in 2003. with Ismaily. In 2003. he joined Malaysian club from Seremban Negeri Sembilan FA, after a successful year in Malaysia Ekpoki moved to Slovenia to start his European career with NK Ljubljana. Following some good matches in Slovenia he was noticed by Spanish manager who took him to Spain to join squad of Gimnàstic de Tarragona in Catalonia, Spain which that year 2005-2006 got promoted to Liga football Primera after 56 years. Year later Ekpoki re-enforced UD Vecindario a team from Canary Islands . Afterwards he played with HIT Gorica again in Slovenia. In summer 2008 he signed a contract until 30 June 2008 with K.A.A. Gent of the Belgium Jupiler League. He also played with Slovenian NK Drava Ptuj before moving to Vietnam and playing with V-League club Sông Lam Nghệ An. He played ten league games scoring five goals. He also played the FA Cup final where he scored the only goal that saw Sông Lam winning the Vietnamese cup in 2010. He remained in Vietnam before moving back to his family in Europe. He resurfaced in Croatia, joining the ranks of the Treća HNL Zapad team NK Rovinj near the end of 2013.

He is nicknamed Razak.
