= Shahrizam Mohamed =

Malaysian footballer

Personal information
- Full name: Sharizam Mohamed
- Date of birth: 27 March 1979 (age 47)
- Place of birth: Negeri Sembilan, Malaysia
- Height: 1.75 m (5 ft 9 in)
- Position: Defender

Team information
- Current team: Terengganu FA

Senior career*
Years	Team	Apps	(Gls)
2000–2007	Negeri Sembilan FA		(3)
2007–2008	Sarawak FA		(0)
2009–	Terengganu FA		
- * Club domestic league appearances and goals

Shahrizam Mohamed (born 27 March 1979 in Negeri Sembilan, Malaysia), is a professional footballer who plays as a defender for Terengganu FA.

Prior to this he played for Negeri Sembilan FA from 2000 to 2007. He is the team captain for Sarawak FA in 2007 before being replaced by Joseph Kalang Tie after his departure.
