= Ching Hong Aik =

Malaysian former footballer

Personal information
- Full name: Ching Hong Aik
- Date of birth: 30 November 1973 (age 52)
- Place of birth: Malacca, Malaysia
- Height: 1.56 m (5 ft 1 in)
- Position: Left-back

Youth career
- Malacca Youth Team

Senior career*
Years	Team	Apps	(Gls)
1993–2001	Negeri Sembilan FA		
2002	Sarawak FA		(0)
2003–2010	Negeri Sembilan FA		(4)
2011	Muar Municipal Council FC	19	(1)

International career
- Malaysia Olympic Team
Chinese name
Traditional Chinese	鄭宏育
Simplified Chinese	郑宏育
Hanyu Pinyin	Zhèng Hóngyù
Jyutping	Zeng6 Wang4 Juk6
Hokkien POJ	Tēⁿ Hông-io̍k
Tâi-lô	Tēnn Hông-io̍k
- * Club domestic league appearances and goals

Ching Hong Aik is a Malaysian former professional footballer who primarily played as a left-back and defender. Born on November 30, 1973, in Malacca, he carved out a legacy defined by loyalty, consistency, and quiet excellence, making him one of the most respected figures in Malaysian football.

== Career Timeline ==
Sources:

- 2002: Transferred to Sarawak FA for a single domestic season following his initial nine-year stint with Negeri Sembilan FA.
- 2003–2010: Returned to Negeri Sembilan FA, where he established himself as a senior presence and a veteran core defender for the team.
- 2011: Transferred to Muar Municipal Council FC (MP Muar FC) alongside former Negeri Sembilan teammate Sani Anuar Kamsani.
- 2011 season statistics: Made 19 league appearances and scored 1 goal in the Malaysia Premier League before announcing his retirement at the end of the season.

== International Career ==
Ching represented the Malaysia national football structure at the under-23 level, earning a spot in the 1994 pre-Olympic squad managed by French coach Claude Le Roy. He was also called up to senior national team training camps during his career peak.

== Honors & Achievements ==
As a key player of Negeri Sembilan, Ching contributed to the team's multiple major domestic championship wins in Malaysian football.

Tournament	Season	Result
Malaysia FA Cup	2003	
Malaysia Super League	2005/06	
Malaysia Premier League	2005	
Malaysia Cup	2009	
Malaysia FA Cup	2010	
