= Wong Sai Kong =

Malaysian footballer

Personal information
- Full name: Wong Sai Kong
- Date of birth: 19 September 1978 (age 48)
- Place of birth: Port Dickson, Malaysia
- Height: 1.79 m (5 ft 10 1/2 in)
- Position: Midfielder

Senior career*
Years	Team	Apps	(Gls)
1999	ATM FA	?	(1)
2000–2001	Negeri Sembilan FA	?	(3)
2002–2004	Sarawak FA	?	(11)
2005	Selangor Public Bank	?	(0)
2006–2007	Perak FA	?	(1)
2007–2009	Sabah FA	?	(3)
2010	Sarawak FA		

International career^{‡}
2004	Malaysia	2	(0)
- * Club domestic league appearances and goals as of 21 December 2008 ‡ National team caps and goals as of 21 December 2008

Wong Sai Kong (born 19 September 1978) is a Malaysian footballer who plays for Sarawak FA in Malaysia Premier League. He is also a former member of Malaysia's national team.

Sai Kong previously played for Negeri Sembilan FA from 2000 until 2001. During the 2000 season, Sai Kong helped Negeri Sembilan FA into the Malaysia Cup final but they were beaten 2–0 by Perak FA in the final. He later moved to Sarawak and took the team to the 2004 Malaysia Super League after defeating Melaka Telekom in the Super League Playoffs.

After spending three seasons with Sarawak FA, Sai Kong signed with Selangor Public Bank. With the club side, he failed to score any league goals although he managed to score two goals during the Malaysia FA Cup. In the 2006 season, he moved to Perak FA after Public Bank announced it would be pulled out from the league. With Perak FA, Sai Kong stayed for only one season. He later signed with Sabah FA. He is currently playing for Sarawak FA.

On the international stage, Sai Kong earned two full international caps with Malaysia. He made his debut against Indonesia on 17 March 2004, appearing as a substitute. He also became part of Bertalan Bicskei's 2004 Tiger Cup squad also appearing as a substitute in Malaysia winning 2–1 over Thailand.

Wong also played a vital role in the Sarawak 2011 premier league campaign after helping his team to secure the super league slot the following season.

For the upcoming season he was not offered a new contract and has since gone into hiatus. He did not continue to play for another team nor a coaching role.
