= Zami Mohd Noor =

Malaysian footballer

Personal information
- Full name: Zami bin Mohd Noor
- Date of birth: 24 February 1972 (age 54)
- Place of birth: Kelantan, Malaysia
- Height: 1.77 m (5 ft 9 1/2 in)
- Positions: Striker; defender

Senior career*
Years	Team	Apps	(Gls)
1991–1995	Kelantan FA		
1996–2002	Negeri Sembilan FA		
2003–2004	Johor FC		
2005	Selangor FA		
2006–2007	Malacca FA		
2007–2009	Proton FC		

International career
1997–2000	Malaysia	1	(1)
- * Club domestic league appearances and goals

Zami Mohd Noor (born 24 February 1972) is a former Malaysian football player.

Zami played for Kelantan FA, Negeri Sembilan FA, Malacca FA, Johor FC, Selangor Public Bank and Proton FC. He began his career with Kelantan as a striker before he converted to a sweeper while playing at Negeri Sembilan. He retired from football following a long-term injury.

Zami also played for Malaysia national football team, and was in the squad for the inaugural 1996 Tiger Cup tournament, where Malaysia finished as runner-up in the final against Thailand national football team.

Zami played for the Malaysia national football team at the 1997 South East Asian Games, where he scored a goal against the Philippines.

He also played for Malaysia national futsal team, and was in the squad that took part in the 1996 FIFA Futsal World Championship in Spain.

== International ==
Malaysia

- Tiger Cup: 1996 runner-up
