= Mohd Rahman Zabul =

Malaysian footballer

Rahman Zabul
Personal information
- Full name: Mohd Rahman bin Zabul
- Date of birth: July 25, 1982 (age 44)
- Place of birth: Seremban, Negeri Sembilan, Malaysia
- Height: 1.76 m (5 ft 9 1/2 in)
- Position: Defender

Team information
- Current team: Kuantan FA
- Number: 2

Youth career
- 2000–2002: Negeri Sembilan FA President Cup

Senior career*
Years	Team	Apps	(Gls)
2002–2010	Negeri Sembilan FA	86	(3)
2011–2012	Johor FC	26	(0)
2013	Felda United F.C.	4	(0)
2014	Kuantan FA	0	(0)
- * Club domestic league appearances and goals as of March 27, 2014 ‡ National team caps and goals as of March 27, 2014

Mohd Rahman Zabul (born 25 July 1982 in Seremban, Negeri Sembilan) is a Malaysian footballer currently playing for FELDA United F.C. in Malaysian Premier League. He started his career with Negeri Sembilan in 2002 and always played as a right back. Rahman will always be remembered by Deer fans because of his hardwork in helping Negeri Sembilan to win Malaysia Cup (2009), FA Cup (2003 and 2010) and Malaysian Super League (2006).
