= Azizon Abdul Kadir =

Malaysian footballer

Personal information
- Full name: Azizon bin Abdul Kadir
- Date of birth: 10 June 1980 (age 46)
- Place of birth: Ipoh, Perak, Malaysia
- Height: 1.85 m (6 ft 1 in)
- Position: Goalkeeper

Team information
- Current team: AAK (goalkeeping coach)

Senior career*
Years	Team	Apps	(Gls)
2002–2004	Malacca	38	(0)
2004–2007	Negeri Sembilan	68	(0)
2007–2009	Kuala Muda Naza	46	(0)
2008	→ Sarawak (loan)	9	(0)
2010–2011	Sabah	26	(0)
2012–2013	Kuala Lumpur	38	(0)
2014	PDRM	7	(0)
2015	Perak	12	(0)
2016	Perlis	0	(0)

International career^{‡}
2004–2014	Malaysia	11	(0)
- * Club domestic league appearances and goals as of January 06, 2016 ‡ National team caps and goals as of January 06, 2016

Azizon bin Abdul Kadir (born 10 June 1980 in Ipoh, Perak, Malaysia) is a former professional footballer who played as a goalkeeper.

== Club career ==
During the 2005 season, Azizon helped Negeri Sembilan gain promotion into the Malaysia Super League. They eventually became the 2005–06 champions of the Malaysia Super League. He also helped Kuala Muda Naza to win the 2007–08 Malaysia Premier League. From 2012 to 2013, Azizon played for Kuala Lumpur. In 2014, he was signed by PDRM FA, and played a significant contribution as the team won the 2014 Malaysia Premier League. Azizon then played for his state team, Perak FA in 2015 before changing teams in 2016 to Perlis FA, leaving them at the end of the season. As of 2018, Perlis is the final professional team Azizon has played in his career.

== National team ==
On the international stage, Azizon earned his first cap against Hong Kong on 13 October 2004 in 2006 FIFA World Cup qualification (AFC). He also was part of the squad in the 2004 Tiger Cup as backup to Mohd Syamsuri Mustafa.

During 2007 AFC Asian Cup, the absence of Syamsuri due to injury gave Azizon the chance to take his place as the first choice goalkeeper. However disaster occurred during the tournament as Azizon conceded 12 goals in three matches as Malaysia lost in all their group games.

After the dismal performance at the Asian Cup, Azizon was not included in the Malaysia squad again for seven years, until he was recalled into the Malaysia starting line-up on 14 September 2014 by Dollah Salleh for the friendly match against Indonesia. He played in the match as a starter, which ended in a 2–0 loss to Malaysia This was the final appearance of Azizon for the national team.
