= Khairul Anuar Baharom =

Malaysian footballer (born 1974)

Khairul Anuar
Personal information
- Full name: Khairul Anuar bin Baharom
- Date of birth: 26 April 1974 (age 52)
- Place of birth: Kuala Lumpur, Malaysia
- Position: Defender

Youth career
- Kuala Lumpur FA President Cup

Senior career*
| Years | Team | Apps | (Gls) |
| | Terengganu FA | | (0) |
| 1994–1996 | Kedah FA | | |
| 1997–1998 | Perak FA | | (0) |
| 1999–2007 | Negeri Sembilan FA | | |
| 2008 | PDRM FA | | |
| 2009–2011 | Selangor FA | | |

International career^{‡}
| 1994-1999 | Malaysia | 11 | (0) |
- * Club domestic league appearances and goals as of 9 April 2012 ‡ National team caps and goals as of 4 June 2011

Khairul Anuar Baharom (born 26 April 1974 in Kuala Lumpur ) is a Malaysian former footballer. Khairul recently played as a defender and midfielder for Selangor FA.

He was a product of Kuala Lumpur FA youth development team and previously played with Terengganu FA, Perak FA, Negeri Sembilan FA and PDRM FA before joining Selangor FA. He was released at the end of the 2011 season, and subsequently retired from football. At the start of his career, he played for the Malaysia national football team.
