= Everson Maciel =

Brazilian footballer and manager (born 1978)

Personal information
- Full name: Everson Martinelli Maciel
- Date of birth: 14 March 1978 (age 48)
- Place of birth: Londrina, Brazil
- Position: Midfielder

Team information
- Current team: USA Futsal Team

Youth career
- 1990–2001: Londrina

College career
Years	Team	Apps	(Gls)
2002–2003	Quinnipiac Bobcats		

Senior career*
Years	Team	Apps	(Gls)
1993–1995	Gremio Londrinense (futsal)		
1996	Corinthians (futsal)		
1996	Rio Branco de Americana		
1997-1999	Londrina Esporte Clube		
2000-2002	Quinnipiac University	34	(32)
2003	Negeri Sembilan	24	(7)
2003–2004	Cleveland Force (indoor)	4	(1)
2004–2008	Western Mass Pioneers	77	(38)
2008–2009	Massachusetts Twisters (indoor)	8	(6)
2011–2021	Safira FC (futsal)		

International career^{‡}
2019-2021	United States futsal	13	(4)

Managerial career
- 2005–: Ginga FC
- * Club domestic league appearances and goals as of 4 May 2021 ‡ National team caps and goals as of 4 May 2021

Everson Martinelli Maciel (born 14 March 1978 in Londrina) is a Brazilian former footballer who spent the majority of his career with the Western Mass Pioneers in the United Soccer Leagues. He currently plays futsal for Safira FC and the United States national futsal team.

Maciel started his football career in his native Brazil with Londrina Esporte Clube at the youth level. Afterward, he moved to North America specifically to the United States to pursue college soccer with Quinnipiac University. Later he signed with the Western Mass Pioneers, where he spent his entire career playing in the USL Second Division. He was part of the club's regular-season championship-winning team, in which he led Western to the playoff finals. Over the years he would continue to receive All-League recognition, winning All-League honors for four consecutive years. He holds the distinction of being one of only six players in the league's history to receive the honor four times. In February 2010, he was ranked 9th in the USL Second Division Top 15 of the Decade, which announced a list of the best and most influential players of the previous decade.

== Playing career ==
Maciel began playing football at the youth level in Brazil with Londrina Esporte Clube. During his time with Londrina he held position of captain for four seasons. His lists of achievements during his tenure there is winning the First Dourados Tournament, Foz do Iguacu Juniors, Monte Alegre de Minas Tournament and the Campeonato Paranaense. In 1997, Maciel debuted for the Londrina Esporte Club senior team and played there till 1999. In 2000 Maciel went abroad to the United States to enroll at Quinnipiac University. At Quinnipiac, Maciel is ranked among the leaders all-time at Quinnipiac as he is tied for second in goals scored with 31, and third in career points. His list of accomplishments at Quinnipiac is being named the Northeast Conference Player of the Year, and the Quinnipiac Male Athlete of the Year during the 2001–02 season. He was also named to the All-NEC First Team on two occasions.

In 2003, he signed with Negeri Sembilan in Malaysia where he won the FA Cup scoring the winning goal at first overtime. Playing for Negeri Everson scored 12 goals and had 14 assists. In 2004, he came back to the US and was signed by the Western Mass Pioneers where he had a successful rookie season, despite the fact the Pioneers failed to reach the postseason. He recorded six goals and added two assists, which earned him into USL Second Division All-League team. In the 2005 season he led the club to its first Regular Season Championship, while tallying five goals and recording four assists throughout the season. He was named into second All-League team for the second consecutive time. During the club's playoff run Maciel helped bring the Pioneers back twice in the two-game aggregate score series against Wilmington Hammerheads, scoring both equalizers in the second leg after a 1–0 loss on the road in the opener, sending the club to its second championship game appearance on a 3-2 aggregate victory. In the finals match the Pioneers faced the Charlotte Eagles, where the game finished as a 2–2 draw which brought the match into penalties. Unfortunately Western were edged out of the title despite Maciel's conversion on his shot.

Throughout his tenure with the Pioneers, Maciel would continue on making an impact despite the fact club struggled reach the postseason for two consecutive seasons. For four years straight he was selected into the All-League team. In the 2008 season he helped Western reach the playoffs for the first time in two years. In the quarterfinal match they were defeated by eventual champions Cleveland City Stars by a score of 4–2. Maciel subsequently retired from soccer after his contract expired with the Western.

Since retiring from outdoor soccer, Maciel has returned to playing futsal. He joined Massachusetts-based Safira FC in 2011, and in 2021 was named to the United States national futsal team for the 2021 CONCACAF Futsal Championship.

== Coaching career ==
In 2005 Maciel founded the Everson Soccer Academy which provides coaching services to local soccer clubs in the New Haven CT area. Everson Soccer Academy coaches over 12,000 young players ranging from ages 2.5 to 18. In addition to this, he also is the owner of Ginga FC a premier soccer club. In 2021, Maciel was hired by Sacred Heart Academy (Hamden, Connecticut) as its girls' soccer head coach.

== Honors ==
=== Western Mass Pioneers ===
- USL Second Division Regular Season Champions (1): 2005

=== Negeri Sembilan ===
- Malaysia FA Cup: 2003
