= K. Rajan (footballer) =

Malaysian footballer

Personal information
- Full name: Rajan a/l Koran
- Date of birth: 19 January 1981 (age 45)
- Place of birth: Bahau, Negeri Sembilan, Malaysia
- Height: 1.76 m (5 ft 9 in)
- Position: Midfielder

Team information
- Current team: Negeri Sembilan (assistant head coach)

Youth career
- 1998–2000: Negeri Sembilan FA

Senior career*
Years	Team	Apps	(Gls)
2001–2004	Negeri Sembilan FA	?	(?)
2005–2006	Selangor FA	?	(?)
2006–2007	Telekom Melaka	?	(?)
2007–2008	Pahang FA	?	(?)
2009	Kuala Muda NAZA FC	?	(?)
2010	Terengganu FA	?	(?)
2011	Felda United FC	21	(0)
2012	Sarawak FA		
2013	FELDA United FC		
2014	Malacca United F.C.	5	(1)

International career^{‡}
2002–2003	Malaysia	5	(0)

Managerial career
- 2022: Negeri Sembilan (assistant)
- 2024–: Negeri Sembilan (assistant)
- 2026: Negeri Sembilan (interim)
- * Club domestic league appearances and goals as of 25 January 2012 ‡ National team caps and goals as of 22 May 2011

K. Rajan (born 19 January 1981 in Negeri Sembilan) is a Malaysian former footballer who is currently the assistant head coach of Malaysia Super League club Negeri Sembilan.

A former Sarawak FA player, Rajan have played with several other teams in the Malaysia League.

He also has played with the Malaysia national football team.

== Club career ==
=== Malacca United ===
On 13 November 2013, Rajan signed for Malaysian FAM League side Malacca United F.C. On 21 January 2014, Rajan made his debut for the club as substitute, in 2-1 FA Cup Malaysia lost against Perlis FA at home. On 23 March 2014, Rajan scored his first goal for Malacca . He scored the opener in Malacca United F.C.'s 3-1 away defeat to Kuala Lumpur FA

== Career statistics ==
=== Malaysia Super League 2012 ===
#	Competition	Date	Venue	Opponent	Result	Score	Assist
1.	Malaysia Super League	10 January 2012	Sarawak Stadium, Petra Jaya, Sarawak	Kuala Lumpur FA	2-0 (W)		
2.	Malaysia Super League	14 January 2012	Likas Stadium, Kota Kinabalu, Sabah	Sabah FA	1-2 (L)		1
3.	Malaysia Super League	17 January 2012	Sarawak Stadium, Petra Jaya, Sarawak	Terengganu FA	0-1 (L)		
4.	Malaysia Super League	21 January 2012	Bukit Jalil National Stadium, Kuala Lumpur	Selangor FA	0-0 (D)		

== Managerial statistics ==
As of 25 June 2026

Managerial record by team and tenure
Team	Nat.	From	To	Record								Ref.
Team	Nat.	From	To	G	W	D	L	GF	GA	GD	Win %	Ref.
Negeri Sembilan (interim)	(Malaysia)	23 February 2026	25 June 2026	8	2	6	0	18	12	+6	25.00	
Career Total				8	2	6	0	18	12	+6	25.00	
