= Sani Anuar Kamsani =

Malaysian footballer

Personal information
- Date of birth: 5 April 1983 (age 43)
- Place of birth: Sepang, Malaysia
- Height: 1.73 m (5 ft 8 in)
- Position: Goalkeeper
- PDRM FA
- MP Muar FC
2012–	Sarawak FA		

Sani Anuar Kamsani is a Malaysian footballer.

== Career ==
Product of Selangor FA youth team, Sani never stood a chance to represent his senior state team. He later signed with numerous mediocre team such as TNB Kelantan FC.

He was signed to play with Negeri Sembilan after released by PDRM and become understudy under then current number one goalkeeper, Farizal Harun. He then become the first choice goalkeeper after Farizal was injured for most of the 2010 season.

After helping Negeri Sembilan to FA Cup triumph in 2010 and appearance in the 2010 Malaysia Cup final, he moved to MP Muar FC with teammate Ching Hong Aik for the 2011 Malaysia Premier League season. He joins Sarawak for the 2012 Super League Malaysia season.

Sani cemented his placed in the squad which saw he helped them won the 2013 Malaysia Premier League title and reached 2013 Malaysia Cup semi final after losing out to eventual winner, Pahang FA .

For upcoming 2015 season, Sani officially announced on his Facebook page he's already penned a new deal with Penang FA thus ended his spell with the bornean side.

2017 marking up Sani final season with the panthers as he not offered new deal by the end of the season.
