= Efendi Abdul Malek =

Malaysian footballer

Efendi Malek
Personal information
- Full name: Efendi bin Abdul Malek
- Date of birth: 5 September 1978 (age 48)
- Place of birth: Negeri Sembilan, Malaysia
- Position: Striker

Youth career
- 1995–1997: Negeri Sembilan FA

Senior career*
Years	Team	Apps	(Gls)
1998–2004	Negeri Sembilan FA		
2005–2006	Perlis FA		
2006–2007	Telekom Melaka		
2007–2009	Negeri Sembilan FA		
2010	Sarawak FA		
2011	ATM FA		
2012	MP Muar FC		
2013	Betaria FC		

International career^{‡}
2005	Malaysia	1	(0)
- * Club domestic league appearances and goals as of 25 January 2012 ‡ National team caps and goals as of 22 May 2011

Efendi bin Abdul Malek (born 5 September 1978 in Negeri Sembilan) is a Malaysian former footballer.

He is most associated with his hometown team, Negeri Sembilan FA, whom he played for 9 years in 2 spells. His other clubs include Melaka TMFC, Perlis FA, Sarawak FA, MP Muar FC and ATM FA. He last professional club was Betaria FC, whom he played for in the 2013 Malaysia Premier League.

He also has played with the Malaysia national football team.
