= Negeri Sembilan FC =

Malaysian association football club

Negeri Sembilan
- Full name: Negeri Sembilan Football Club
- Nicknames: Jang (Note: Short for Ujang, a second-person pronoun for males in Negeri Sembilan Malay.); Hobin Jang Hobin (Note: Hobin (alternatively hoben) in Negeri Sembilan Malay means "to strike".); Rusa (The Deers)
- Short name: NSE
- Founded: 1923; 103 years ago as Negeri Sembilan FA; 2020; 6 years ago as Negeri Sembilan Football Club
- Ground: Tuanku Abdul Rahman Stadium
- Capacity: 25,550
- Owner: Negeri Sembilan Football Association
- Chairman: YAB Dato' Haji Ismail Lasim
- Head coach: Daniel Giménez
- League: Malaysia Super League
- 2025–26: Malaysia Super League, 7th of 13
- Website: www.nsfc1923.com
Home colours	Away colours

Negeri Sembilan Football Club (Malay: Kelab Bola Sepak Negeri Sembilan), commonly referred to as Negeri Sembilan or simply NSFC, is a Malaysian professional football club based in Seremban, Negeri Sembilan. The club competes in the top division of Malaysian football, the Malaysia Super League.

Founded in 1923 as Negeri Sembilan Football Association (Malay: Persatuan Bolasepak Negeri Sembilan), it has been chaired by YAB Dato' Haji Ismail Lasim on 14 August 2026. The club represented the state of Negeri Sembilan, and won their first major honour in the 1948 Malaysia Cup.

Since its establishment in 1923, Negeri Sembilan has won several domestic cups, such as the Malaysia Cup in 1948, 2009, and 2011, as well as the Malaysia FA Cup in 2003 and 2010. In addition, the club won the Malaysia Super League in 2005–06 and managed to qualify for the AFC Cup, a continental-level competition, in 2004 and 2007. The club also gave rise to many Malaysian football stars who brought success to both club and country, such as Kwan Soon Teck, Mok Wai Hong, B. Rajinikandh, N. Thanabalan, B. Sathianathan, Ching Hong Aik, Shukor Adan, Norhafiz Zamani, Aidil Zafuan, Zaquan Adha, Farizal Marlias, S. Kunanlan, Shahurain Abu Samah, Syihan Hazmi and many more. Head coach, K. Devan became the pinnacle of the club guiding Negeri Sembilan to win the 2005–06 Malaysia Super League, 2003 Malaysia FA Cup and also the 2021 Malaysia Premier League.

The club has won 1 Malaysia Super League title, 2 Malaysia Premier League titles, 3 Malaysia Cup, 2 Malaysia FA Cup and 1 Malaysia Charity Shield.

== History ==
=== Early era ===
The club was established in 1923, according to an interview with Austin Senevirathe. He stated that the Malaya Cup match between Negeri Sembilan and Singapore took place in that particular year. In 1948, they won the first HMS Malaya Cup, led by Kwan Soon Teck.

=== Isa Samad era (1982–2004) ===
In 1982, Tan Sri Dato' Seri Utama Mohd Isa bin Dato' Haji Abdul Samad was appointed president of the Negeri Sembilan Football Association (PBNS) as well as the Menteri Besar of Negeri Sembilan. 1991 was the year of the revival of the Negeri Sembilan team. That was also the last year before the Tuanku Abdul Rahman Stadium. On 18 August 1991, the team met Sarawak in the final match of the Division 2 League. Negeri Sembilan, who was in first place at the time, only needed a draw while Sarawak needed a win to get the top spot. The match went to Negeri Sembilan favour with a result of 2–2. Among the star players were the Bozik Brothers (Miroslav and Robert), and Marian Vazquez. Local players included Richard Scully, Mansor Sulaiman, and Nazari Hussein. In the 1996 season, Negeri Sembilan became one of the contenders for the title. The team starring two import players from Argentina, Gus Cerro and Jose Iriarte, and locals Othman Katmon, Faizal Zainal, Khairil Zainal, Rosli Omar, B. Rajinikandh, A. Ganeson, V. Arumugham, Idris Kadir, Azmi Mohamed, and Ching Hong Aik, surprised many despite not winning eventually.

On 31 May 2003, Negeri Sembilan met Perlis in the FA Cup final. Played at Perak Stadium, the club was surprised by the opponent's early goal in the 11th minute. The club managed to close the gap in the 56th minute thanks to a goal by Effendi Malek. In the 95th minute, Everson Martinelli scored for the trophy.

Negeri Sembilan made its first appearance in the AFC Cup competition in the 2004 season. The club opened it against Island FC with a 6–0 win on 10 February. However, the club had to settle for being 3rd after losing all the remaining group stage matches, including Geylang United and East Bengal.

=== Mohamad Hasan era (2004–2018) ===
In March 2004, Datuk Seri Mohamad Hasan was appointed as the president of the Negeri Sembilan Football Association (PBNS). He held the position as the 10th Menteri Besar of Negeri Sembilan.

In the 2005–06 season, the team won the Malaysia Super League. The newly promoted team from the Malaysian Premier League in the 2005 season managed to become the league champion in their first appearance. On 7 November 2009, the team ended their 61-year drought in the Malaysia Cup after posting a convincing 3–1 victory over Kelantan in the final at the National Stadium, Bukit Jalil. The team also won all the matches in the Malaysia Cup tournament.

The repeated final happened again on 30 October 2010. However, this time the club lost 1–2 to Kelantan despite having taken an early lead through Shahurain Abu Samah. On April 10, 2010, Negeri Sembilan needed the luck of the penalty shootout to win the FA Cup championship again by beating Kedah 5–4.

In 2011, the club again qualified for the Cup final for the third consecutive time. They won the trophy after defeating Terengganu FA with an epic comeback. The first goal was scored by Mohd Ashaari Shamsuddin for Terengganu in the 59th minute. S. Kunanlan equalised the score in the 81st minute before Hairuddin Omar hit the winning goal in the 85th minute.

Throughout the years 2003–2011, there was a "golden generation" for Negeri Sembilan, with the emergence of players like Ching Hong Aik, Shukor Adan, Norhafiz Zamani, Khairul Anuar Baharom, Bekamenga Bekamengo, Sani Anuar, Rezal Zambery, Zaquan Adha, Aidil Zafuan, Farizal Marlias, S. Kunanlan, and Shahurain. On 6 December 2014, the president of the Negeri Sembilan Football Association announced that the Negeri Sembilan team would be known as the Negeri Sembilan Matrix from 2015.

=== Razman al-Qadri era (2018–2025) ===
On September 10, 2018 Tunku Syed Razman Tunku Syed Idrus Al-Qadri was elected as the new president of the Negeri Sembilan Football Association (PBNS) for the period of 2018–2021. On 20 October 2020, the club officially made its privatisation as Negeri Sembilan Football Club. The club has been registered under a private limited company named Negeri Sembilan Football Club Sdn. Bhd. (Negeri Sembilan Football Club Pvt. Ltd.). The club became a subsidiary of the Negeri Sembilan Football Association (PBNS).

In 2024, Faliq Firdaus was appointed as the new chief executive officer of Negeri Sembilan, becoming the youngest CEO in the Malaysia Super League history.

On 31 July 2026, Aminuddin Harun resigned as chairman of Negeri Sembilan FC after serving in the position since June 2025. His resignation was accepted by the club, with Tunku Syed Razman Tunku Syed Idrus Al-Qadri appointed as acting chairman.

=== Aminuddin Harun era (2025–2026) ===
On 12 June 2025, Negeri Sembilan appointed YAB Dato’ Seri Utama Hj Aminuddin bin Harun, the First Minister of Negeri Sembilan, as the club's new chairman. The announcement was made by YTM Tunku Syed Razman, the Tunku Besar of Tampin and President of the Negeri Sembilan Football Association (PBNS). The appointment reflects a strategic effort to strengthen football governance in the state, with PBNS focusing on grassroots development while Negeri Sembilan operates as a competitive professional entity. Dato’ Seri Aminuddin expressed his commitment to revitalising Negeri Sembilan and uniting the community through football.

On 13 June 2025, Negeri Sembilan appointed Mohd Nidzam Jamil as the head coach of their Malaysia Super League team for the 2025–26 season. The appointment was officially announced by the club's chairman, YAB Dato’ Seri Aminuddin bin Harun, as part of NSFC's long-term strategic plan to build a more competitive and sustainable team.

For the first time, Negeri Sembilan held the NSFC Player Awards (APNSFC) for 2025–26 season to recognise and honour the club's top-performing players and individuals for their achievements throughout the season. The awards comprised Best Player, Best Young Player, Best Goal, Best Assist, Unsung Hero and Fans' Award.

On 26 June 2026, Negeri Sembilan announced the appointment of Daniel Giménez Alcañiz as the club's new head coach for the 2026–27 season, replacing interim head coach Rajan Koran.

=== Ismail Lasim era (2026–present) ===
On 14 August 2026, YAB Dato' Haji Ismail Lasim was appointed as the new chairman of Negeri Sembilan, succeeding YAB Dato' Seri Utama Haji Aminuddin Harun.

== Team image ==
=== Name history ===
Negeri Sembilan has used several names throughout its 100-year history.

Years	Name	References
1921–2005	Negeri Sembilan	
2005–2008	Negeri Sembilan Naza	
2009–2014	Negeri Sembilan	
2015	Negeri Sembilan Matrix	
2016–2018	Negeri Sembilan FA	
2019–present	Negeri Sembilan	

- 1923–2005: Negeri Sembilan

In tournaments the Negeri Sembilan Football Association only used Negeri Sembilan or Negri Sembilan as the team name. Negeri Sembilan is the name of one of the states in Malaysia, and the Negeri Sembilan Football Association is the governing body of football, founded to represent the state. The team used it from 1923 through 2004 before it was rebranded in 2005.

- 2005–2008: Negeri Sembilan Naza

Negeri Sembilan was rebranded in 2005. The team, sponsored by a motor company from Malaysia named Naza, started in 2005. This has caused Negeri Sembilan to be given a new name: Negeri Sembilan Naza, or simply NS Naza, to represent the name of the sponsoring company.

- 2009–2014: Negeri Sembilan

In 2009, Naza withdrew from sponsoring the Negeri Sembilan football team. The team later cancelled the name Negeri Sembilan Naza and changed it back to Negeri Sembilan for the 2009 league season. They have used it until season 2014.

- 2015: Negeri Sembilan Matrix

On 6 December 2014 the president of the Negeri Sembilan Football Association (PBNS) announced the team's new branding by changing it to Negeri Sembilan Matrix, or simply NS Matrix. With a larger amount of sponsorship from Matrix Concepts Holdings Berhad and a bigger investment for the team, they had a greater vision and mission to carry out. Unfortunately, on 25 August 2015, NS Matrix was disbanded for not meeting the expectations set by PBNS.

- 2016–2020: Negeri Sembilan FA

Due to the disbandment of NS Matrix in the previous year, the team used the Negeri Sembilan name again starting in 2016. The team used it for 5 years until 2020, when they started using the new name because they had registered as a private football club.

- 2020–present: Negeri Sembilan

To achieve the targeted standards and the campaign implemented by the Football Association of Malaysia (FAM), the Negeri Sembilan team has privatised their team to become a football club. Previously operating as a football association, the team has started a new chapter with the privatisation of their football team.

=== Crest and colours ===
==== Crest ====
Negeri Sembilan previously used the crest of the Negeri Sembilan Football Association (PBNS). After being privatised in 2020, Negeri Sembilan started using the new crest. The competition was won by Azral Ramlay.

Rice Stalks: The main crest displays nine white rice stalks tied with red rope into one in the middle, symbolising the nine states in the old Negeri Sembilan: Jelai, Jelebu, Johol, Kelang (now part of Selangor), Naning (now part of Malacca), Rembau, Segamat-Pasir Besar, Sungei Ujong, and Ulu Pahang. Moreover, it is designed to resemble the crest on the state's coat of arms, which is the Changgai Puteri fronted by a sword and scabbard.

Circle: The basic shape, which is a golden yellow circle in the royal color, symbolises the strong unity between the team, players, supporters, and the people of Negeri Sembilan under the auspices of D.Y.M.M. Yang Di-Pertuan Besar Negeri Sembilan Darul Khusus.

Escutcheon: The escutcheon of the arms is depicted as an old French shield outlined in black. The three basic colours of Negeri Sembilan symbolise all the people, players, and supporters coming together to protect their team, along with the lyrics of the Negeri Sembilan song, "Musuhnya Habis Binasa" (English: "His enemies perished").

==== Colours ====
Yellow, black and red: Negeri Sembilan uses three colours from the state flag as its official colours. The colours have been used on the crest and team kits since its establishment. Based on the flag, the yellow represents the Yang di-Pertuan Besar of Negeri Sembilan, the black symbolises the four undangs (traditional chiefs), and the red denotes the citizens of the state. However, in the context of the football, these three colours have their own meaning: yellow represents the team, black symbolises the players, and red denotes the supporters.

Kits: Red as the dominant colour is used for the home kit, while for the away kit the dominant colour is yellow, with the addition of some red and black. As for the third kit, there are several dominant colour variations, such as white, blue, and black.

=== Supporters ===
Negeri Sembilan has a big fanbase in every corner of Negeri Sembilan. It is no exception that there are fans from abroad who support and follow the progress of the Negeri Sembilan team. Negeri Sembilan fans have gone through a period of highs and lows with the team when they were often relegated and promoted. The loyalty of the fans was tested when the team was relegated to the 2nd-tier league and had a disappointing season, but that paid off when the team made it to the top flight and managed to win several trophies. In 2011, Negeri Sembilan once set a record for the average number of supporters attending, which was around 20,000 and above, from the start of the Malaysia Cup campaign until the final round against Terengganu. In the semi-final against T-Team, more than 40,000 (Note: Actual attendance were 43,500 including Negeri Sembilan and T-Team fans.) fans filled the Paroi Stadium.

==== Chants ====
Like other teams, Negeri Sembilan has several chants that are chanted by fans. The most popular chant is "Hobin jang hobin" (English:"Strike lad strike"), which is a trademark of Negeri Sembilan. Others include "Ini Paroi jangan main" (English: "This is Paroi don't underestimate"), "Akan berkati sekalian yang setia" (English: "Will bless all the devotees"), "Musuhnya habis binasa," (English:"His enemies perished"), "Buffalo souljah". In addition, there are some mainstream songs that are made by popular Malaysian singers, including "Hobin Jang Hobin" and "Lagu Bola".

There is a very popular chant created by the Ultras Nogori. The chant is called "Sehati Sejiwa" and has been used by most ultras in Malaysia until it was brought to the international level to be used by Ultras Malaya. The lyrics of the chant are as follows:

"Kami turun ke stadium sehati sejiwa
Kami turun ke stadium sehati sejiwa
Ne..ge..ri
Ne..ge..ri
Sehati sejiwa"

==== Fan clubs ====
There are several fan clubs that have been established since the early 2000s.

- Ultras Nogori 9 (UN9)
- UltraJang
- Kelab e-Penyokong Bola Sepak Negeri Sembilan (N9FUTBOL.COM)
- [PSNS] Penyokong Setia Negeri Sembilan
- Soker K-N9
- State of Nine FC
- The Jangs
- Otai N9 Bola Fans
- Nogori Supporters
- Negeri Sembilan Selatan
- PD Pirates
- Info Bola Sepak Negeri Sembilan(Kelab Penyokong)
- Soghomban Corefront - SCF
- Seberang Grandstand - atas
- STATE of NINE - SYS
- Negeri Nine
- Naning Media
- Black Blood Boys
- Moncheh Black Armour
- Team N9FC
- Nismilan - 1923
- Supporter Negeri Sembilan FC
- Media Kito Syapalikh TV
- Penyokong Bola Sepak Negeri Sembilan (Bahagian Sikamat)

=== Rivalries ===
In the southern part of the country, there is a three-way rivalry between Negeri Sembilan, Melaka (currently Melaka FC), and Johor Darul Ta'zim; they fight to be the best club representing the Southern Region of Malaysia.

==== Naning Derby (Melaka) ====
The Naning Derby refers to the football rivalry between Negeri Sembilan and Melaka, two neighbouring teams from the historical Naning region along the Negeri Sembilan–Melaka border. Named after the former district of Naning, which once had political ties to Negeri Sembilan before becoming part of Malacca, the derby carries a sense of regional pride and local identity. Although not as high-profile as some rivalries, matches between Negeri Sembilan and Melaka are often intense and emotionally charged due to proximity, fan interactions, and state pride.

Meetings between the two clubs—especially when both compete in the same division—often draw strong local interest, with fixtures at STAR and Hang Jebat Stadium attracting passionate home crowds. The Naning Derby is a symbol of southern central rivalry, and despite fluctuations in form and league status over the years, the fixture continues to hold significance among fans of both sides. The rivalry is set to reignite in the 2025–26 Malaysia Super League season, as both teams return to the top flight.

==== Southern Derby (JDT) ====
The Southern Derby is a football rivalry between Negeri Sembilan and Johor Darul Ta'zim (JDT), representing two neighboring southern states of Peninsular Malaysia. Though the rivalry dates back to earlier decades, it gained renewed intensity after JDT's transformation into a football powerhouse in 2013. Negeri Sembilan, known for their proud football tradition, often play the role of spirited challengers in these matchups. Despite JDT's dominance in recent years, matches between the two sides remain fiercely contested due to geographical proximity, historical encounters, and the pride of representing southern Malaysia.

Matches between the two teams regularly attract high attendances in both Paroi and Iskandar Puteri. While JDT has won the majority of recent encounters, Negeri Sembilan continues to contest the fixture, which reflects a longstanding regional rivalry.

=== Club licensing regulations ===
Negeri Sembilan was granted the National License for the 2026–27 season by the First Instance Body (FIB) of the Malaysian Football League (MFL), as part of the FAM Club Licensing process. The license approval confirms that the club has met the minimum criteria required under the national licensing regulations, including areas such as sporting standards, infrastructure, administrative and personnel qualifications, legal compliance, and financial stability. Possession of the National License permits the club to participate in the 2026–27 Malaysia Super League, the top tier of professional football in Malaysia, as well as all other competitions and cup tournaments organised by the Malaysian Football League.

== Kit suppliers and shirt sponsors ==
List of Negeri Sembilan sponsors history.

Period	Kit manufacturer	Main sponsor
1990–1992	(Japan) Mizuno	(England) Dunhill
1993–1999	(Germany) Adidas	(England) Dunhill
2000	(Japan) Mizuno	(England) Dunhill
2001	(France) Line 7	(England) Dunhill
2002–2004	(Malaysia) J-King	(England) Dunhill
2005–2007	(Italy) Lotto	Telekom Malaysia
2007–2010	(Italy) Kappa	Telekom Malaysia
2011	(Italy) Lotto	No sponsors
2012–2013	(Italy) Lotto	(Malaysia) Matrix Concept
2014	(South Korea) Kika	(Malaysia) Matrix Concept
2015	(Italy) Kappa	(Malaysia) Matrix Concept
2016–2017	(Japan) Mizuno	(Malaysia) Matrix Concept
2018	(Malaysia) AL Sports	(Malaysia) Matrix Concept
2019	(Malaysia) Rhino	(Malaysia) Matrix Concept
2020	(England) Admiral	(Malaysia) Matrix Concept
2021–2022	(Malaysia) Kaki Jersi	(Malaysia) Matrix Concept
2024–2025	(Spain) Kelme	(Malaysia) Matrix Concept
2025–present	(Thailand) Warrix	(Malaysia) Matrix Concept

=== Sponsors ===
List of Negeri Sembilan sponsors for 2026–27 seasons.

Sponsor	Period	Name	Fee
Kit sponsor	2025–present	(Thailand) Warrix	RM1.7 million
Main sponsor	2012–present	Matrix Concept	—
Shirt sponsor	2019–present	MBI Negeri Sembilan	—
Shirt sponsor	2024–present	Negeri Roadstone	—
Right sleeve sponsor	2026–present	NS Corporation	—
Left sleeve sponsor	2021–present	Gemencheh Granite	—
Back sponsor	2024–present	IRC Negeri Sembilan	—
Back sponsor	2026–present	SAINS	—

=== Kit sponsor ===
Warrix is a Thai sportswear manufacturer established in 2013, best known for supplying kits to the Thailand national football team since 2017 and several prominent Southeast Asian clubs. The brand emphasizes performance innovation with advanced fabrics and has grown into a leading name in the regional football scene. In 2025, Warrix signed a two-year deal worth RM 1.7 million to become the official kit sponsor of Negeri Sembilan FC, covering the senior team as well as the U‑20 and U‑18 squads for the 2025–26 and 2026–27 seasons.

=== Main/shirt sponsor ===
Negeri Sembilan is backed by key sponsors including Matrix Concepts Holdings Berhad, a prominent Malaysian property developer; MBI Negeri Sembilan, the state's municipal investment body; and Negeri Roadstone Sdn. Bhd., a supplier, infrastructure and construction company. Matrix Concepts has been the club's main sponsor since 2012, while MBI Negeri Sembilan joined in 2024 as a shirt sponsor. Negeri Roadstone, initially a sleeve/shoulder sponsor in 2019 until 2023, became a shirt sponsor in 2024.

== Academy development ==
The development structure of Negeri Sembilan's reserve and youth teams has evolved through several phases.

The first phase began in 1985 with the establishment of Negeri Sembilan U-21 to compete in the Piala Presiden, which was also introduced that year. In 2008, Negeri Sembilan U-19 was formed following the creation of the Piala Belia as the national competition for under-19 teams. In 2023, the club established Negeri Sembilan U-23 to participate in the inaugural MFL Cup, which was introduced in the same year.

In 2022, the Football Association of Malaysia (FAM) announced that the age limit for the Piala Presiden would be lowered from under-21 to under-20, while the Piala Belia would be changed from under-19 to under-18, in line with the Asian Football Confederation (AFC) age-group competition cycle. The changes took effect from the 2023 season.

In 2026, the club further restructured its development system by establishing its reserve team, Negeri Sembilan FC II. At the same time, its Piala Presiden team was renamed Negeri Sembilan FC III to align the club's development teams with the Roman numeral naming system. Following the restructuring, the club withdrew from the Piala Belia, ending its participation in the competition.

2026–27 development squads season
Team	Type	Competition
Negeri Sembilan II	Reserve/under-23 team	Malaysia A1 Semi-Pro League
Negeri Sembilan U20	Under-20	Piala Presiden

== Stadium ==
Negeri Sembilan has used several football fields and stadiums as their home ground.

#	Stadium	Year
1	Seremban Municipal Council Field (Padang Stesyen)	1940s–1982
2	Kuala Pilah Stadium (interim)	1982
3	Seremban Municipal Council Stadium (Padang Stesyen)	1982–1992
4	Tuanku Abdul Rahman Stadium	1992–present

- 1940s–1982: Seremban Municipal Council Field

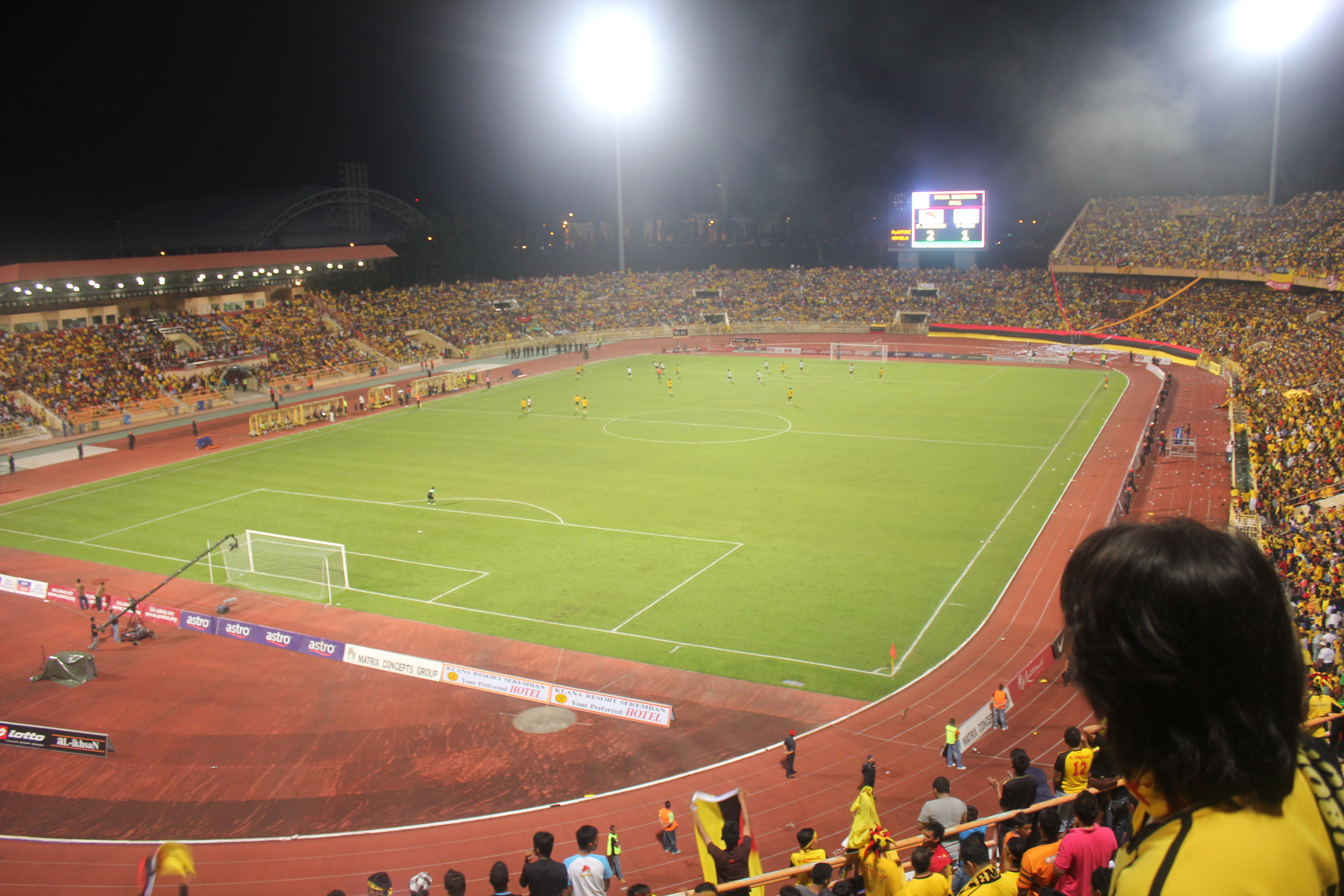
Tuanku Abdul Rahman Stadium has been the home ground of Negeri Sembilan since 1992

Around the 1940s, Negeri Sembilan started playing at Seremban Municipal Council Field (Malay: Padang Majlis Perbandaran Seremban) since it was built by the British Resident of Negeri Sembilan, John Vincent Cowgill. Seremban Municipal Council Field, better known as Padang Stesyen (English: Station Field) because it was located next to the Seremban railway station, has a sweet history for Negeri Sembilan since it was the first venue where the HMS Malaya Cup was lifted by the team. In 1960 it was upgraded by building 500 seats. In 1973, Padang Stesyen was upgraded to be used for the Field Hockey World Cup. The seats were increased to 5,000.

- 1982: Kuala Pilah Stadium

Kuala Pilah Mini Stadium, or Kuala Pilah Stadium, was used as the temporary home ground of Negeri Sembilan in 1982. The stadium located in Kuala Pilah was used because Padang Stesyen was being upgraded at that time.

- 1982–1992: Seremban Municipal Council Stadium

In 1982, Padang Stesyen was upgraded as Seremban was being granted city status. This caused the name of the field to be changed to Seremban Municipal Council Stadium (Malay: Stadium Majlis Perbandaran Seremban). The Negeri Sembilan team reused this field as their home ground until 1992, when that was the last year the team used the stadium, and it became the starting point for the revival of the Negeri Sembilan team. This iconic stadium was later demolished to make way for the development of Seremban and construction of a shopping centre in 1993.

- 1992: Tuanku Abdul Rahman Stadium

The Tuanku Abdul Rahman Stadium (STAR) (Malay: Stadium Tuanku Abdul Rahman) is named in honour of Tuanku Abdul Rahman ibni Almarhum Tuanku Muhammad, the eighth Yamtuan Besar of Seri Menanti, the second Yamtuan Besar of modern-day Negeri Sembilan, and the first Yang di-Pertuan Agong of Malaysia. In 2004, the capacity of the stadium had been upgraded to 45,000 for the hosting of the 2004 Sukma Games. In 2025, seats were installed in the stands, and the stadium's capacity was reduced to 25,550 to ensure greater comfort for the fans attending the matches.

=== Sleeve sponsor ===
Gemencheh Granite Sdn. Bhd., a quarry and construction materials provider, and NS Corporation, a state statutory body and economic development agency of Negeri Sembilan, are the sleeve sponsors of Negeri Sembilan. Gemencheh Granite, which has supported the club since 2021, retains its place on the left sleeve, while NS Corporation joined as the right sleeve sponsor in 2026.

=== Back sponsor ===
Syarikat Air Negeri Sembilan Sdn. Bhd. (SAINS), a state-owned water utility responsible for the management and supply of treated water in Negeri Sembilan, and IRC Negeri Sembilan, a rehabilitation and wellness provider, are the back sponsors of Negeri Sembilan. Introduced during the 2024–25 season, back sponsorship marked a new addition to the club's kit branding, with IRC becoming the first organisation to appear in that position, while SAINS joined as a back sponsor in 2026.

=== Official sponsors & partners information ===
Years	Sponsors/Partners	Business types	Contributions	Contract
2012–present	Matrix Concept	Holding company	Advertising on kit	Until June 2027
2019–present	Negeri Roadstone	Quarry	Advertising on kit	Until June 2027
2019–2020, 2026–present	SAINS	Water utility	Advertising on kit	Until June 2027
2020, 2024–present	ATF Sport Taping	Sports	Provide sports equipment	Until June 2027
2021–present	Gemencheh Granite	Quarry	Advertising on kit	Until June 2027
2022, 2024–present	IRC Negeri Sembilan	Sport facility	Advertising on kit	Until June 2027
2023–present	UH Medical Solutions	Medical	Medical facility	Until June 2027
2023–present	KR Tour & Travel	Travel agency	Transportation	Until June 2027
2024–present	MBI Negeri Sembilan	State council	Advertising on kit	Until June 2027
2024–present	Total Protection	Insurance agency	Provide insurance	Until June 2027
2024–present	Klana Resort Seremban	Resort	Undisclosed	Until June 2027
2025–present	Oh! Media	Media	Media partner	Until June 2027
2025–present	(Thailand) Warrix	Sportswear	Kit sponsor	Until June 2027
2026–present	Trident Made by Kuckreja	Sports	Undisclosed	Until June 2027
2026–present	Bubbles O2	Beverage	Provide drink	Until June 2027
2026–present	NS Corporation	Government investor	Advertising on kit	Until June 2027
2026–present	Mawar Medical Centre	Medical	Medical facility	Until June 2027
2026–present	(Myanmar) Zora	Beverage	Provide drink	Until June 2027
2026–present	SISJ Usahaniaga	Industrial engineering	Undisclosed	Until June 2027
2026–present	Dai-G	LED signage	Undisclosed	Until June 2027
2026–present	GD Holdings	Real estate	Undisclosed	Until June 2027
2026–present	Jempol Bakery	Bakery	Undisclosed	Until June 2027
2026–present	(United Kingdom) STATSports	Sports data	Performance monitoring	Until June 2029
2026–present	N-EG FUEL	Sports supplement	Provide energy gel	Until June 2029

== Affiliated club ==
- UiTM

The NSFC–UiTM collaboration involves sharing information, expertise, and solution methods in football for the purpose of facilitating work and research processes. This collaboration also emphasises the importance of learning in the field of sports science to improve the quality of training, nutrition, and treatment of Negeri Sembilan players.

- (Japan) Gainare Tottori

Negeri Sembilan maintains an affiliation with Japanese club Gainare Tottori centred on football development, technical cooperation and player exchange. The partnership includes the sharing of coaching expertise, youth development initiatives and exchange programmes involving players and coaching staff, providing opportunities for technical attachments and training in Japan. The relationship has also facilitated player movement between the two clubs, with Negeri Sembilan acquiring players from Gainare Tottori through both loan and permanent transfers. The affiliation forms part of Negeri Sembilan's broader strategy to strengthen its football development structure through international collaboration.

== Players ==
=== First-team squad ===
As of 14 October 2026

Note: Flags indicate national team as defined under FIFA eligibility rules; some limited exceptions apply. Players may hold more than one non-FIFA nationality.

No.	Pos.	Nation	Player
1	GK	MAS	Syahmi Adib Haikal
2	DF	MAS	Raimi Shamsul
3	DF	SGP	Ryaan Sanizal
4	DF	KOR	Park Yi-young
5	DF	JPN	Kei Oshiro
6	MF	USA	Wan Kuzri
7	MF	JPN	Takumi Sasaki
8	MF	MYA	Wai Lin Aung
9	FW	BIH	Jovan Motika
10	FW	MAS	Luqman Hakim
11	FW	MTN	Aboubakar Kamara
12	MF	MAS	Afiq Fitri
13	FW	JPN	Yusuke Minagawa
14	MF	MAS	Akram Mahinan
16	FW	MAS	Rahman Daud

No.	Pos.	Nation	Player
17	MF	MAS	Alif Mutalib
18	DF	MAS	Khuzaimi Piee (Captain)
19	FW	MAS	N. Javabilaarivin
20	MF	JPN	Mio Tsuneyasu
21	MF	MAS	Haiqal Haqeemi
22	GK	MAS	Aqil Razak
23	DF	MGL	Filip Andersen
24	MF	JPN	Yuichi Hirano
26	DF	MAS	Hairiey Hakim
27	DF	MAS	Zainal Abidin Jamil
28	DF	MAS	Ariff Ar-Rasyid
30	GK	MAS	Azri Ghani
32	FW	MAS	Akhyar Rashid (on loan from Terengganu)
33	MF	MAS	Umar Hakeem

=== Reserve team and Youth Academy ===
Note: Flags indicate national team as defined under FIFA eligibility rules; some limited exceptions apply. Players may hold more than one non-FIFA nationality.

No.	Pos.	Nation	Player
34	MF	MAS	Adam Haikal Azizol
35	FW	MAS	Izrin Ibrahim
37	DF	MAS	Zuryhakim Zafran
57	FW	ENG	Anuar Ceesay

=== Out on loan ===
Note: Flags indicate national team as defined under FIFA eligibility rules; some limited exceptions apply. Players may hold more than one non-FIFA nationality.

No.	Pos.	Nation	Player

== Management and staff ==
=== Management ===
As of 5 August 2026

Position	Staff
Chairman	(Malaysia) YAB Dato' Haji Ismail Lasim
Advisory board	(Malaysia) YB Dato' Mohd Zafir Ibrahim
Advisory board	(Malaysia) YB Dato’ Hj Mohd Khidir Bin Majid
Advisory board	(Malaysia) YB Dato' Hj Mustapha Nagoor
Advisory board	(Malaysia) YBhg Dato' Masri Haji Razali
Director	(Malaysia) Abd Razak Mohd Idrus
Chief executive officer	(Malaysia) Faliq Firdaus
Chief operating officer	(Malaysia) Firdaus Bhari
Technical director	(Malaysia) Efendi Abdul Malek
Team admin & special project	(Malaysia) Muhammad Zulkhairi Shamsudin
Finance & HR	(Malaysia) Rizal Jaafar
Media	(Malaysia) Ahmad Maaroff Baharuddin
Team manager	(Malaysia) Abd Razak Mohd Idrus
Assistant manager	(Malaysia) Hamdan Othman

=== Technical staff ===
As of 23 August 2026

Position	Staff
Head coach	(Spain) Daniel Giménez
Assistant head coach	(Malaysia) Rajan Koran
Assistant head coach	(Malaysia) Khairul Ismail
Assistant coach	(Malaysia) Irfan Fadzil Idrus
Goalkeeper coach	(Malaysia) Megat Amir Faisal
Fitness coach	(Malaysia) Khairal Afiq Jamal Abd Haziq
Team analyst	(Malaysia) Aiman Danial Mat Aris
Team doctor	(Malaysia) Dr. Rozaiman Ebrahim
Physiotherapist	(Malaysia) Syaiful Sabtu
Physiotherapist	(Malaysia) Ahmad Faisal Miswan
Team coordinator	(Malaysia) Azri Raffi
Security officer	(Malaysia) Sohaimi Hasim
Masseur	(Lebanon) Mahmoud El Hajj
Masseur	(Malaysia) Zahari Mazlan
Kitman	(Malaysia) Jefri Jaafar
Kitman	(Malaysia) Sharizal Mat Sah

== Honours ==
Negeri Sembilan honours
Type	Competition	Titles	Seasons
Domestic	Malaysia Super League	1	2005–06
Domestic	Semi-Pro League 2 / Premier League	2	1991, 2021
Domestic	Malaysia Cup	3	1948, 2009, 2011
Domestic	Malaysia FA Cup	2	2003, 2010
Domestic	Malaysia Charity Cup	1	2012

== Award winners ==
=== Domestic ===
- Most Valuable Player
  - (Malaysia) Shukor Adan (2006–07)
  - (Malaysia) Hazwan Bakri (2016)
- League Golden Boot
  - (Cameroon) Jean-Emmanuel Effa Owona (2012) (Malaysia Super League)
  - (Liberia) Francis Doe (2015) (Malaysia Premier League)
- Best Goalkeeper of the Season
  - (Malaysia) Syihan Hazmi (2022)
- Best Defender of the Season
  - (Malaysia) Khairul Anuar Baharom (2005–06)
  - (Malaysia) Aidil Zafuan (2009, 2010)
  - (Malaysia) Norhafiz Zamani (2011)
- Best Young Player of the Season
  - (Malaysia) Zaquan Adha (2006–07)
- Best Foreign Player
  - (Cameroon) Christian Bekamenga (2005–06)

== Records and statistics ==
=== Coach records ===
Category	Coach	Record
Most titles	(Malaysia) K. Devan	3 titles
Most league wins	(Malaysia) K. Devan	88 wins
Most league points	(Malaysia) K. Devan	310 points
Most league matches	(Malaysia) K. Devan	178 matches
Most league wins in a single season	(Malaysia) M. Karathu	17 wins (1996)
Most league points in a single season	(Malaysia) M. Karathu	57 points (1996)
Most loyal	(Malaysia) K. Devan	8 years of service

=== Player records ===
Category	Player	Record
Most titles	(Malaysia) Zaquan Adha	5 titles
Most titles	(Malaysia) Idris Abdul Karim	5 titles
Most titles	(Malaysia) Abdul Halim Zainal	5 titles
Most titles	(Malaysia) Kaharuddin Rahman	5 titles
Most appearances	(Malaysia) Ching Hong Aik	260 appearances (Note: Not official, probably he has more appearances.)
Most goals	(Malaysia) Zaquan Adha	72 goals
Most loyal	(Malaysia) Ching Hong Aik	17 years of service

== Former players ==
=== Notable players ===
Years	Players	Achievement	
Years	Players	Competition	Season
1940s	(Malaysia) Kwan Soon Teck	HMS Malaya Cup	1948
1950s	(Malaysia) Mok Wai Hong		
1970s	(Malaysia) Burhanuddin Joned		
1978–1986, 1988–1989	(Malaysia) B. Sathianathan		
1991–1993	(Slovakia) Miroslav Bozik	Liga Semi-Pro 2	1991
1991–1993	(Slovakia) Miroslav Bozik	Kings Gold Cup	1992
1991–1994	(Slovakia) Robert Bozik	Liga Semi-Pro 2	1991
1991–1994	(Slovakia) Robert Bozik	Kings Gold Cup	1992
1991, 1994	(Slovakia) Marian Valach	Liga Semi-Pro 2	1991
1992	(Malaysia) Lim Teong Kim	Kings Gold Cup	1992
1992–1999	(Malaysia) Faizal Zainal	Kings Gold Cup	1992
1992–1999, 2002	(Malaysia) Khairil Zainal	Kings Gold Cup	1992
1990s	(Malaysia) Yeo Swee Hock	Kings Gold Cup	1992
1993–2001, 2003–2010	(Malaysia) Ching Hong Aik	Malaysia Cup	2009
1993–2001, 2003–2010	(Malaysia) Ching Hong Aik	Super League	2005–06
1993–2001, 2003–2010	(Malaysia) Ching Hong Aik	FA Cup	2003, 2010
1994–1999, 2003–2006	(Malaysia) B. Rajinikandh	FA Cup	2003
1994–1999, 2003–2006	(Malaysia) B. Rajinikandh	Super League	2005–06
1994, 1998–2001, 2012–2013	(Malaysia) Mohd Hamsani Ahmad	Charity Cup	2012
1995–1997	(Malaysia) Azmi Mohamed		
1996	(Argentina) Jose Iriarte		
1996–1998	(Malaysia) Othman Katmon		
1996–1998	(Australia) Gus Cerro		
1996–2002	(Malaysia) Zami Mohd Noor		
1996–2001, 2007–2008	(Malaysia) Yazid Yassin		
1990s	(Malaysia) Rosli Omar		
1998	(Australia) Scott Ollerenshaw		
1998–1999	(Malaysia) Ahmad Shahrul Azhar		
1998–2004, 2007–2009	(Malaysia) Efendi Abdul Malek	Malaysia Cup	2009
1998–2004, 2007–2009	(Malaysia) Efendi Abdul Malek	FA Cup	2003
1999–2006	(Malaysia) Khairul Anuar Baharom	Super League	2005–06
1999–2006	(Malaysia) Khairul Anuar Baharom	FA Cup	2003
1999–2006	(Malaysia) Khairul Anuar Baharom	Best defender	2005–06
2000–2001, 2003	(Malaysia) Azman Adnan	FA Cup	2003
2000–2004, 2011–2014, 2019–2020	(Malaysia) Norhafiz Zamani Misbah	Malaysia Cup	2011
2000–2004, 2011–2014, 2019–2020	(Malaysia) Norhafiz Zamani Misbah	Charity Cup	2012
2000–2004, 2011–2014, 2019–2020	(Malaysia) Norhafiz Zamani Misbah	FA Cup	2003
2000–2004, 2011–2014, 2019–2020	(Malaysia) Norhafiz Zamani Misbah	Best defender	2011
2000–2001, 2009–2012	(Malaysia) Shukor Adan	Malaysia Cup	2009, 2011
2000–2001, 2009–2012	(Malaysia) Shukor Adan	FA Cup	2010
2000–2001, 2009–2012	(Malaysia) Shukor Adan	Charity Cup	2012
2001–2004	(Malaysia) K. Rajan	FA Cup	2003
2002–2010	(Malaysia) Mohd Rahman Zabul	Malaysia Cup	2009
2002–2010	(Malaysia) Mohd Rahman Zabul	FA Cup	2003, 2010
2002–2010	(Malaysia) Mohd Rahman Zabul	Super League	2005–06
2003	(Brazil) Everson Martinelli	FA Cup	2003
2003–2007	(Malaysia) Anuar Jusoh	Super League	2005–06
2003–2007	(Malaysia) Anuar Jusoh	FA Cup	2003
2004–2006	(Cameroon) Christian Bekamenga	Super League	2005–06
2004–2006	(Cameroon) Christian Bekamenga	Best foreign player	2005–06
2004–2007	(Malaysia) Azizon Abdul Kadir	Super League	2005–06
2005–2010	(Malaysia) K. Thanaraj	Malaysia Cup	2009
2005–2010	(Malaysia) K. Thanaraj	FA Cup	2010
2005–2010	(Malaysia) K. Thanaraj	Super League	2005–06
2005–2011	(Malaysia) Aidil Zafuan	Malaysia Cup	2009, 2011
2005–2011	(Malaysia) Aidil Zafuan	FA Cup	2010
2005–2011	(Malaysia) Aidil Zafuan	Super League	2005–06
2005–2011	(Malaysia) Aidil Zafuan	Best defender	2009, 2010
2005–2013	(Malaysia) Idris Abdul Karim	Malaysia Cup	2009, 2011
2005–2013	(Malaysia) Idris Abdul Karim	FA Cup	2010
2005–2013	(Malaysia) Idris Abdul Karim	Super League	2005–06
2005–2013	(Malaysia) Idris Abdul Karim	Charity Cup	2012
2005–2010, 2015	(Malaysia) Rezal Zambery Yahya	Malaysia Cup	2009
2005–2010, 2015	(Malaysia) Rezal Zambery Yahya	FA Cup	2010
2005–2010, 2015	(Malaysia) Rezal Zambery Yahya	Super League	2005–06
2005–2011, 2021–2023	(Malaysia) Zaquan Adha	Malaysia Cup	2009, 2011
2005–2011, 2021–2023	(Malaysia) Zaquan Adha	FA Cup	2010
2005–2011, 2021–2023	(Malaysia) Zaquan Adha	Super League	2005–06
2005–2011, 2021–2023	(Malaysia) Zaquan Adha	Premier League	2021
2005–2011, 2021–2023	(Malaysia) Zaquan Adha	Territory Minister Cup	2022
2005–2011, 2021–2023	(Malaysia) Zaquan Adha	Best young player	2006–07
2006–2007	(Malaysia) Liew Kit Kong		
2007–2012	(Malaysia) S. Kunanlan	Malaysia Cup	2009, 2011
2007–2012	(Malaysia) S. Kunanlan	FA Cup	2010
2007–2012	(Malaysia) S. Kunanlan	Charity Cup	2012
2007–2013, 2020	(Malaysia) Shahurain Abu Samah	Malaysia Cup	2009, 2011
2007–2013, 2020	(Malaysia) Shahurain Abu Samah	FA Cup	2010
2007–2013, 2020	(Malaysia) Shahurain Abu Samah	Charity Cup	2012
2007–2011	(Malaysia) Farizal Harun	Malaysia Cup	2009, 2011
2007–2011	(Malaysia) Farizal Harun	FA Cup	2010
2007–2014	(Malaysia) Tengku Qayyum	Malaysia Cup	2009, 2011
2007–2014	(Malaysia) Tengku Qayyum	FA Cup	2010
2007–2014	(Malaysia) Tengku Qayyum	Charity Cup	2012
2008–2014, 2019–2021	(Malaysia) Abdul Halim Zainal	Malaysia Cup	2009, 2011
2008–2014, 2019–2021	(Malaysia) Abdul Halim Zainal	FA Cup	2010
2008–2014, 2019–2021	(Malaysia) Abdul Halim Zainal	Charity Cup	2012
2008–2014, 2019–2021	(Malaysia) Abdul Halim Zainal	Premier League	2021
2009, 2011	(Malaysia) Hairuddin Omar	Malaysia Cup	2009, 2011
2009–2014	(Malaysia) Alif Samsudin	Malaysia Cup	2009, 2011
2009–2014	(Malaysia) Alif Samsudin	FA Cup	2010
2009–2014	(Malaysia) Alif Samsudin	Charity Cup	2012
2009–2023	(Malaysia) Kaharuddin Rahman	Malaysia Cup	2009, 2011
2009–2023	(Malaysia) Kaharuddin Rahman	FA Cup	2010
2009–2023	(Malaysia) Kaharuddin Rahman	Charity Cup	2012
2009–2023	(Malaysia) Kaharuddin Rahman	Premier League	2021
2009–2023	(Malaysia) Kaharuddin Rahman	Territory Minister Cup	2022
2009–2023	(Malaysia) Kaharuddin Rahman	Kings Gold Cup	2015
2011–2012	(Malaysia) Farizal Marlias	Malaysia Cup	2011
2011–2012	(Malaysia) Farizal Marlias	Charity Cup	2012
2012, 2014	(Cameroon) Jean-Emmanuel Effa Owona	Charity Cup	2012
2012, 2014	(Cameroon) Jean-Emmanuel Effa Owona	MSL golden boot	2012
2015	(Liberia) Francis Doe	Kings Gold Cup	2015
2015	(Liberia) Francis Doe	MPL golden boot	2015
2018–2019, 2022	(Malaysia) Syihan Hazmi	Best goalkeeper	2022

== Notable players ==
=== International capped players ===
AFC/OFC.: (Australia) Andrew Nabbout; (Australia) Scott Ollerenshaw; (Australia) Taylor Regan; (Japan) Takumi Sasaki; (Cambodia) Prak Mony Udom; (Mongolia) Filip Andersen; (Myanmar) Hein Htet Aung; (Myanmar) Wai Linn Aung; (Japan) Takumi Sasaki; (Palestine) Oday Kharoub; (Palestine) Yashir Pinto; (Philippines) Ángel Guirado; (Philippines) Omid Nazari; (Singapore) Amirul Adli; (Singapore) Madhu Mohana; (Singapore) Ryaan Sanizal; (Singapore) Safuwan Baharudin; (South Korea) Kim Do-heon; (South Korea) Kim Jin-yong	CAF.: (Angola) Freddy; (Cameroon) Anicet Eyenga; (Cameroon) Christian Bekamenga; (Cameroon) Jean-Emmanuel Effa Owona; (Equatorial Guinea) Luis Enrique Nsue; (Gabon) Lévy Madinda; (Liberia) Nathaniel Naplah; (Liberia) Francis Doe; (Mauritania) Aboubakar Kamara; (Nigeria) Aliyu Abubakar; (Sierra Leone) Lamin Conteh; (Sierra Leone) Thomas Koroma; (South Africa) Philani Kubheka; (Togo) Francis Koné	UEFA.: (Bosnia and Herzegovina) Jovan Motika; (Croatia) Marko Šimić; (France) Hérold Goulon; (Latvia) Renārs Rode; (Malta) Alfred Effiong	CONMEBOL/ CONCACAF.: (Brazil) Casagrande; (Haiti) Jean Alexandre; (Saint Vincent and the Grenadines) Shandel Samuel

== Managerial history ==
List of Negeri Sembilan former coaches/managers.

Tenure	Coach	Achievement
1981–1982	(Malaysia) Tony Chia	
1983–1984	(Malaysia) Zainuddin Hussein	
1985–1986	(Malaysia) Tony Chia (Note: Second time being appointed as head coach, having last served from 1981 to 1982.) (2)	
1987	(Brazil) Manilton Santos	
1987	(Malaysia) Tony Chia (Note: Appointed as the head coach on July 1987, during the ongoing season. Also, third time being appointed as head coach, having last served from 1985 to 1986.) (2)	
1988–1989	(Malaysia) Zainuddin Hussein (2)	
1989	(Malaysia) M. Kuppan (Note: Appointed as the head coach on September 1989, during the ongoing season.)	
1990–1991	(Malaysia) Ruslan Yaakob	1991 Liga Semi-Pro 2
1992–1993	(Slovakia) Josef Herel	
1994–1998	(Malaysia) M. Karathu	
1999	(Malaysia) Irfan Bakti	
2000–2002	(Malaysia) Mohd Zaki Sheikh Ahmad	
2003–2006	(Malaysia) K. Devan	2003 FA Cup
2003–2006	(Malaysia) K. Devan	2005–06 Super League
2007–2011	(Malaysia) Wan Jamak	2009 Malaysia Cup
2007–2011	(Malaysia) Wan Jamak	2010 FA Cup
2011–2012	(Malaysia) Azraai Khor (Note: Appointed as the head coach on 21 March 2011, during the ongoing season.)	2011 Malaysia Cup
2011–2012	(Malaysia) Azraai Khor	2012 Charity Shield
2013	(Portugal) Divaldo Alves	
2013	(Malaysia) Ridzuan Abu Shah (Note: Appointed as the caretaker on 14 May 2013, during the ongoing season.) (caretaker)	
2014	(Singapore) V. Sundramoorthy	
2015	(Malaysia) K. Devan (Note: Second time being appointed as head coach, having last served from 2003 to 2006.) (2)	
2016	(Australia) Gary Phillips	
2017	(Malaysia) Asri Ninggal	
2018	(Germany) Jörg Steinebrunner	
2018	(Malaysia) Azraai Khor (Note: Appointed as the head coach on 28 February 2018, during the ongoing season. Also, second time being appointed as head coach, having last served from 2011 to 2012.) (2)	
2018	(Portugal) Mário Lemos (Note: Appointed as the head coach on 11 May 2018, during the ongoing season.)	
2019	(Malaysia) Mat Zan Mat Aris	
2020	(Malaysia) Sazali Saidon	
2021–2023	(Malaysia) K. Devan (Note: Third time being appointed as head coach, having last served in 2015) (3)	2021 Premier League
2024	(Malaysia) Azzmi Aziz	
2024–2025	(Malaysia) K. Nanthakumar (Note: Appointed as the head coach on 15 August 2024, during the ongoing season.)	
2025–2026	(Malaysia) Nidzam Jamil	
2026	(Malaysia) K. Rajan (Note: Appointed as the caretaker on 23 February 2026, during the ongoing season) (interim)	
2026–present	(Spain) Daniel Giménez	

== Season by season record ==
=== Season-by-season records ===
1st or Champions 2nd or Runner-up 3rd place Promotion Relegation

Season	League		Cup				Asia		Note
Season	Division	Pos	Charity	Malaysia	FA	Challenge	Competition	Result	Note
1982	Liga Malaysia		—	—	—	—	—	—	
1983	Liga Malaysia	13th	—	—	—	—	—	—	
1984	Liga Malaysia	9th	—	—	—	—	—	—	
1985	Liga Malaysia	15th	—	—	—	—	—	—	
1986	Liga Malaysia	12th	—	—	—	—	—	—	
1987	Liga Malaysia	16th	—	—	—	—	—	—	
1988	Liga Malaysia	10th	—	—	—	—	—	—	
1989	Liga Semi-Pro 2	7th	—	—	—	—	—	—	
1990	Liga Semi-Pro 2	3rd	—	—	1st round	—	—	—	
1991	Liga Semi-Pro 2	1st	—	Group stage	1st round	—	—	—	
1992	Liga Semi-Pro 1	3rd	—	Group stage	1st round	—	—	—	
1993	Liga Semi-Pro 1	10th	—	—	Semi-finals	—	—	—	
1994	Liga Perdana	12th	—	—	—	—	—	—	
1995	Liga Perdana	11th	—	—	—	—	—	—	
1996	Liga Perdana	3rd	—	Group stage	—	—	—	—	
1997	Liga Perdana	7th	—	Group stage	Quarter-finals	—	—	—	
1998	Liga Perdana 1	9th	—	Semi-finals	2nd round	—	—	—	
1999	Liga Perdana 1	3rd	—	Semi-finals	Semi-final	—	—	—	
2000	Liga Perdana 1	6th	—	Runner-up	Quarter-finals	—	—	—	
2001	Liga Perdana 1	8th	—	3rd round	Quarter-finals	—	—	—	
2002	Liga Perdana 1	14th	—	—	2nd round	—	—	—	
2003	Liga Perdana 2	2nd	—	Group stage	Champions	—	—	—	
2004	Premier League	4th	Runner-up	Quarter-finals	Quarter-finals	—	AFC Cup	Group stage	
2005	Premier League	1st	—	Group stage	1st round	—	—	—	
2005–06	Super League	1st	—	Runner-up	Semi-finals	—	—	—	
2006–07	Super League	11th	—	Quarter-finals	2nd round	—	AFC Cup	Group stage	
2007–08	Super League	2nd	—	Group stage	2nd round	—	—	—	
2009	Super League	7th	—	Champions	Semi-finals	—	—	—	
2010	Super League	6th	Runner-up	Runner-up	Champions	—	—	—	
2011	Super League	8th	—	Champions	2nd round	—	—	—	
2012	Super League	6th	Champions	Quarter-finals	1st round	—	—	—	
2013	Super League	12th	—	Group stage	Quarter-finals	—	—	—	
2014	Premier League	6th	—	Play-off	1st round	—	—	—	
2015	Premier League	6th	—	Play-off	2nd round	—	—	—	
2016	Premier League	4th	—	Quarter-finals	3rd round	—	—	—	
2017	Premier League	5th	—	Group stage	Semi-finals	—	—	—	
2018	Super League	12th	—	—	2nd round	Group stage	—	—	
2019	Premier League	6th	—	Group stage	2nd round	—	—	—	
2020	Premier League	11th	—	Group stage	2nd round	—	—	—	
2021	Premier League	1st	—	Group stage	—	—	—	—	
2022	Super League	4th	—	Quarter-finals	1st round	—	—	—	
2023	Super League	9th	—	Round of 16	Quarter-finals	—	—	—	
2024–25	Super League	12th	—	Quarter-finals	Round of 16	—	—	—	
2025–26	Super League	7th	—	Quarter-finals	Quarter-finals	—	—	—	

=== Head-to-head records ===
As of 15 June 2026

Negeri Sembilan's head-to-head records against other 2026–27 Malaysia Super League clubs since Malaysia Super League and Malaysia Premier League introduced in 2004.

Negeri Sembilan versus
Clubs	Win	Draw	Loss	Ms	Win%
DPMM	2	2	2	6	33.33%
Star City	1	2	1	4	25%
Johor Darul Ta'zim	11	6	18	35	31.43%
Kelantan RW	0	0	0	0	0%
KL City	8	12	9	29	27.59%
Kuching City	1	4	4	9	11.11%
Melaka	0	1	1	2	0%
Penang	13	8	12	34	38.24%
Sabah	8	8	11	27	29.63%
Selangor	11	8	24	43	25.58%
Terengganu	17	16	25	58	29.31%

=== Club's top goalscorers by season ===
Seasons	League		All competitions	
Seasons	Players	Goals	Players	Goals
2004	(Malaysia) Shahrin Abdul Majid	11	(Malaysia) Efendi Abdul Malek	12
2005	(Cameroon) Christian Bekamenga	16	(Cameroon) Christian Bekamenga	21
2005–06	(Cameroon) Christian Bekamenga	8	(Cameroon) Christian Bekamenga	19
2006–07	(Angola) Frederico Dos Santos	9	(Angola) Frederico Dos Santos	13
2007–08	(Malaysia) Zaquan Adha	11	(Malaysia) Zaquan Adha	14
2009	(Malaysia) Zaquan Adha	11	(Malaysia) Zaquan Adha	23
2010	(Malaysia) Zaquan Adha	8	(Malaysia) Zaquan Adha	14
2011	(Malaysia) Mohd Firdaus Azizul	7	(Malaysia) Hairuddin Omar	11
2012	(Cameroon) Jean-Emmanuel Effa Owona	15	(Cameroon) Jean-Emmanuel Effa Owona	23
2013	(Malaysia) Shahurain Abu Samah	2	(Brazil) Fábio Leandro Barbosa	6
2013	(Malaysia) Rashid Mahmud	2	(Brazil) Fábio Leandro Barbosa	6
2013	(Malaysia) Nazrin Nawi	2	(Brazil) Fábio Leandro Barbosa	6
2014	(South Korea) Kim Jin-yong	8	(South Korea) Kim Jin-yong	8
2015	(Liberia) Francis Doe	17	(Liberia) Francis Doe	19
2016	(Australia) Andrew Nabbout	8	(Australia) Andrew Nabbout	9
2017	(Japan) Bruno Suzuki	11	(Japan) Bruno Suzuki	13
2018	(Argentina) Nicolás Vélez	8	(Brazil) Flávio Júnior	10
2018	(Brazil) Flávio Júnior	8	(Brazil) Flávio Júnior	10
2019	(Brazil) José Almir Barros Neto	8	(Brazil) Igor Luiz	12
2020	(Brazil) Igor Luiz	5	(Brazil) Igor Luiz	5
2021	(Cameroon) Alain Akono	9	(Cameroon) Alain Akono	9
2022	(Brazil) Gustavo	11	(Brazil) Gustavo	11
2023	(Malaysia) Shahrel Fikri	6	(Malaysia) Shahrel Fikri	7
2023	(Malaysia) Shahrel Fikri	6	(Brazil) Casagrande	7
2024–25	(Senegal) Jacque Faye	5	(Malaysia) Selvan Anbualagan	6
2025–26	(Ghana) Joseph Esso	10	(Ghana) Joseph Esso	12

== Continental record ==
=== Continental performance ===
- AFC Cup
  2004: Group stage
  2007: Group stage
  2010: Withdrew

=== Continental matches ===
Season	Competition	Round	Club	Home	Away	Agg/Pos
2004	AFC Cup	Group stage (Group E)	(Maldives) Island FC	6–0	0–1	3rd out of 4
2004	AFC Cup	Group stage (Group E)	(India) East Bengal	2–1	2–4	3rd out of 4
2004	AFC Cup	Group stage (Group E)	(Singapore) Geylang United	0–1	1–2	3rd out of 4
2007	AFC Cup	Group stage (Group D)	(Vietnam) Hoa Phat Hanoi	0–0	0–0	2nd out of 4 (Note: Two best runners-up, one from groups A, B and C and one from groups D, E and F, qualify for the quarter-finals. The club only got 7 points and didn't qualified for the next round.)
2007	AFC Cup	Group stage (Group D)	(Maldives) Victory SC	1–1	2–2	2nd out of 4
2007	AFC Cup	Group stage (Group D)	(Hong Kong) Sun Hei	1–0	0–2	2nd out of 4
2010	AFC Cup	Withdrew (Note: Qualified for the AFC Cup after winning the 2009 Malaysia Cup, but withdrew due to internal reasons.)				

== Foreign players ==
Since the 2025–26 Malaysia Super League season, the Malaysian Football League (MFL) introduced a revised foreign player quota. Each team is allowed to register up to 15 foreign players, but only six can be used in a matchday squad. This includes four world (open) category players, one from an AFC (Asia) member country, and one from an ASEAN (Southeast Asia) country, with an additional three foreign player allowed on the bench.

=== List of foreign players ===
List of NSFC foreign players for 2026–27 season;

Year	Name	Nat	Age	Position	From	Fee	Quota
2025–present	Jovan Motika	(Bosnia and Herzegovina)	27	LW/RW/SS	Kuala Lumpur City	Free	World
2026–present	Anuar Ceesay	(England)	23	LM/RM/AM	UM-Damansara	Free	World
2026–present	Aboubakar Kamara	(Mauritania)	31	FW/LW/RW	Unattached	Free	World
2024–present	Takumi Sasaki	(Japan)	28	AM/CM/LW	Ehime FC	Free	Asia (Note: Asian players can also be registered under the International/World quota)
2025–present	Mio Tsuneyasu	(Japan)	24	RW/LW/AM	Gainare Tottori	Free	Asia
2025–present	Filip Andersen	(Mongolia)	23	CB/LB	Loyola	Free	Asia
2026–present	Kei Oshiro	(Japan)	25	CB/DM	Gainare Tottori	Free	Asia
2026–present	Yuichi Hirano	(Japan)	30	CM/DM	Cerezo Osaka	Free	Asia
2026–present	Yusuke Minagawa	(Japan)	34	FW	Nagaworld	Free	Asia
2026–present	Park Yi-young	(South Korea)	32	CB/RB/DM	Phnom Penh Crown	Free	Asia
2025–present	Wai Linn Aung	(Myanmar)	26	DM/CM	Yangon United	Free	ASEAN
2026–present	Ryaan Sanizal	(Singapore)	24	CB/RB/LB	Hougang United	Free	ASEAN

=== Country by the number of players ===
This list shows the top contributing countries by the number of foreign players who have played for the club.

Country	Flag	FW	MF	DF	GK	Total
Angola	(Angola)	1	—	—	—	1
Argentina	(Argentina)	5	2	—	—	7
Australia	(Australia)	4	2	2	—	8
Bosnia and Herzegovina	(Bosnia and Herzegovina)	1	—	—	—	1
Brazil	(Brazil)	10	4	5	—	19
Cameroon	(Cameroon)	4	—	1	—	5
Croatia	(Croatia)	2	—	—	—	2
Czech Republic	(Czech Republic)	2	—	—	—	2
England	(England)	—	4	—	—	4 (Note: Two players played before 1989, likely unofficial.)
Equartorial Guinea	(Equatorial Guinea)	—	—	1	—	1
France	(France)	2	—	1	—	3
Gabon	(Gabon)	—	1	—	—	1
Ghana	(Ghana)	1	2	—	—	3
Haiti	(Haiti)	—	1	—	—	1
Italy	(Italy)	—	1	—	—	1
Japan	(Japan)	2	4	1	—	7
Kenya	(Kenya)	1	—	—	—	1
Cambodia	(Cambodia)	1	—	—	—	1
Latvia	(Latvia)	—	—	1	—	1
Liberia	(Liberia)	2	—	1	—	3
Mauritania	(Mauritania)	1	—	—	—	1
Mongolia	(Mongolia)	—	—	1	—	1
Myanmar	(Myanmar)	1	1	—	—	2
Netherland	(Netherlands)	—	1	—	—	1
Nigeria	(Nigeria)	3	2	1	1	7
Palestine	(Palestine)	—	2	—	—	2
Philippines	(Philippines)	1	1	—	—	2
Russia	(Russia)	1	—	—	—	1
Saint Vincent	(Saint Vincent and the Grenadines)	1	—	—	—	1
Senegal	(Senegal)	—	1	—	—	1
Serbia	(Serbia)	—	—	1	—	1
Sierra Leone	(Sierra Leone)	1	1	—	—	2
Singapore	(Singapore)	1	1	2	—	4
Slovakia	(Slovakia)	2	1	3	—	6
South Africa	(South Africa)	1	—	—	—	1
South Korea	(South Korea)	1	4	1	—	6
Spain	(Spain)	3	—	—	—	3
Switzerland	(Switzerland)	—	—	1	—	1
Thailand	(Thailand)	1	1	—	—	2
Togo	(Togo)	2	—	—	—	2
USA	(United States)	—	1	—	—	1
Yugoslavia	(Socialist Federal Republic of Yugoslavia)	2	—	—	—	2
Zambia	(Zambia)	—	1	—	—	1
Total		60	39	23	1	124

== See also ==
- Negeri Sembilan FA – Malaysian sports association
- Negeri Sembilan history – History of Negeri Sembilan Football Club
- Negeri Sembilan FC II – Negeri Sembilan FC reserve football team
- Negeri Sembilan U-20s – Negeri Sembilan FC's youth football teams
- NSFC records and statistics
