= List of Malaysian football transfers 2016 =

The following is a list of transfers for 2016 Malaysian football. For the second transfer window, see List of Malaysian football transfers 2016 (June-July).

== Malaysia Super League ==
The 2016 Malaysia Super League (also known as Liga Super Malaysia 2016) is the 13th season of the highest Malaysian football league since its inception in 2004. 12 teams participated in the league with Johor Darul Ta'zim as the defending champions.

The season started on 13 February and concluded on 22 October 2016

=== Felda United ===
==== Transfers In ====
Pos.	Name	From
	(Brazil) Gilberto Alemão	(Brazil) Clube Atlético Bragantino
	(Liberia) Francis Doe	(Malaysia) Negeri Sembilan FA
	(Uzbekistan) Lutfulla Turaev	(Uzbekistan) Lokomotiv Tashkent FK
	(Malaysia) Abdul Shukur Jusoh	(Malaysia) ATM FA
	(Malaysia) Norfazly Alias	(Malaysia) ATM FA
	(Malaysia) Mohd Ridzuan Abdunloh	(Malaysia) Kedah FA (loan)
	(Malaysia) S. Sivanesan	(Malaysia) Negeri Sembilan FA
	(Malaysia) Ahmad Ezrie Shafizie	(Malaysia) PDRM FA
	(Malaysia) Bobby Gonzales	(Malaysia) Perak FA
	(Malaysia) Mohd Idris Ahmad	(Malaysia) Perak FA
	(Malaysia) Mohd Suffian Abdul Rahman	(Malaysia) Sime Darby F.C.
	(Malaysia) Mohd Zul Fahmi Awang	(Malaysia) Young Fighters F.C.
	(Malaysia) Mohd Syahid Zaidon	(Malaysia) Young Fighters F.C. (loan return)
	(Malaysia) Hadin Azman	(Malaysia) Felda United F.C. U21
	(Malaysia) Irwan Jasman Azahar	(Malaysia) Felda United F.C. U21

==== Transfers Out ====
Pos.	Name	To
	(Australia) Ndumba Makeche	(Malaysia) Sarawak FA
	(Malaysia) Shahrulnizam Mustapa	(Malaysia) Felcra F.C.
	(Malaysia) Indra Putra Mahayuddin	(Malaysia) Kelantan FA
	(Malaysia) Mohd Rasyid Aya	(Malaysia) Kuala Lumpur FA
	(Malaysia) Mohd Soffuan Tawil	(Malaysia) Kuala Lumpur FA
	(Malaysia) Mohd Nasriq Baharom	(Malaysia) NS Matrix F.C.
	(Malaysia) Abdul Latiff Suhaimi	(Malaysia) PDRM FA
	(Malaysia) Qhairul Anwar Roslani	(Malaysia) PDRM FA
	(Malaysia) Mohd Fauzan Dzulkifli	(Malaysia) Penang FA
	(Malaysia) Shahrul Mohd Saad	(Malaysia) Perak FA
	(Serbia) Bojan Miladinovic	(Serbia) FK Napredak Kruševac

=== Johor Darul Ta'zim ===
==== Transfers In ====
Name	From
(Argentina) Juan Martín Lucero	(Argentina) Club Atlético Independiente
(Argentina) Jorge Pereyra Díaz	(Argentina) Club Atlético Independiente (loan return)
(Malaysia) K. Sasi Kumar	(Malaysia) Johor Darul Ta'zim II F.C.
(Malaysia) Muhammad Akram Mahinan	(Malaysia) Johor Darul Ta'zim II F.C.
(Malaysia) Azamuddin Akil	(Malaysia) Pahang F.C.
(Malaysia) Mohd Azniee Taib	(Malaysia) Penang FA

==== Transfers Out ====
Name	To
(Malaysia) Mohd Daudsu Jamaluddin	(Malaysia) Kelantan FA
(Malaysia) Muhammad Al-Hafiz	(Malaysia) Johor Darul Ta'zim II F.C.
(Argentina) Patito Rodríguez	(Brazil) Santos FC (loan return)
(Argentina) Luciano Figueroa	RETIRED

=== Kedah FA ===
==== Transfers In ====
Pos.	Name	From
	(Brazil) Kahê	(Brazil) Oeste Futebol Clube
	(Malaysia) Azmeer Yusof	(Malaysia) ATM FA
	(Malaysia) Ariff Farhan Isa	(Malaysia) Harimau Muda
	(Malaysia) Mohd Amirul Hisyam Awang Kechik	(Malaysia) Harimau Muda
	(Malaysia) Mohd Asri Mardzuki	(Malaysia) Harimau Muda
	(Malaysia) Mohd Farhan Abu Bakar	(Malaysia) Harimau Muda
	(Malaysia) Mohd Ridzuan Abdunloh	(Malaysia) Harimau Muda
	(Malaysia) Mohd Syawal Nordin	(Malaysia) Harimau Muda
	(Malaysia) Ahmad Fakri Saarani	(Malaysia) Kelantan FA
	(Malaysia) Amar Rohidan	(Malaysia) Kelantan FA
	(Malaysia) Abdul Halim Saari	(Malaysia) Kedah FA U21
	(Malaysia) Osman Mohd Yusoff	(Malaysia) Kedah FA U21
	(Malaysia) Syazuan Hazani	(Malaysia) Kedah FA U21
	(Malaysia) Muhd Asri Muhamad	(Malaysia) SSMP
	(Malaysia) Mazlan Mohamad	(Malaysia) SSMP
	(Malaysia) S. Cheevaanesvaran	(Malaysia) Penang FA U21
	(Malaysia) P. Som Keat	(Malaysia) Penang FA U21
	(Malaysia) Mohd Badrul Amin Abdul Razak	(Malaysia) Penang FA U19

==== Transfers Out ====
Pos.	Name	From
	(Malaysia) Mohd Ridzuan Abdunloh	(Malaysia) Felda United F.C. (loan)
	(Malaysia) Mohd Firdaus Muhamad	(Malaysia) Penang FA
	(Malaysia) Ahmad Shakir Mohd Ali	(Malaysia) PKNS FC
	(Malaysia) P. Rajesh	(Malaysia) PKNS FC
	(Nigeria) Chidi Edeh	
	(Malaysia) Lew Han Hung	
	(Malaysia) Muhd Fiqkry Mat Isa	

=== Kelantan FA ===
==== Transfers In ====
Pos.	Name	From
	(Brazil) Jonatan Lucca	(Brazil) Clube Atlético Paranaense
	(North Macedonia) Baže Ilijoski	(North Macedonia) FK Rabotnicki
	(Mali) Dramane Traoré	(Malaysia) PDRM FA
	(Malaysia) Indra Putra Mahayuddin	(Malaysia) Felda United F.C.
	(Malaysia) Mohd Ramadhan Hamid	(Malaysia) Harimau Muda
	(Malaysia) Syahrul Azwari Ibrahim	(Malaysia) Harimau Muda
	(Malaysia) Mohd Daudsu Jamaluddin	(Malaysia) Johor Darul Ta'zim F.C.
	(Malaysia) Mohd Faizal Abu Bakar	(Malaysia) PDRM FA
	(Malaysia) Faizol Nazlin Sayuti	(Malaysia) Sabah FA (loan return)
	(Malaysia) Mohd Rozaimi Azwar Mat Noor	(Malaysia) Sabah FA (loan return)
	(Malaysia) Abdul Manaf Mamat	(Malaysia) Terengganu FA
	(Malaysia) Fakhrul Zaman Wan Abdullah Zawawi	(Malaysia) Kelantan FA U21
	(Malaysia) Mohd Qayyum Marjoni Sabil	(Malaysia) Kelantan FA U21
	(Malaysia) Mohd Zafran Akramin Abdul Razak	(Malaysia) Kelantan FA U21
	(Malaysia) Muhd Amir Zikri Pauzi	(Malaysia) Kelantan FA U21
	(Malaysia) Muslim Ahmad	FREE AGENT

==== Transfers Out ====
Pos.	Name	To
	(Colombia) Erwin Carrillo	(Colombia) Real Cartagena
	(Nigeria) Austin Amutu	(Nigeria) Warri Wolves F.C. (loan return)
	(Brazil) Gilmar	(Malaysia) Sarawak
	(Malaysia) Ahmad Fakri Saarani	(Malaysia) Kedah FA
	(Malaysia) Amar Rohidan	(Malaysia) Kedah FA
	(Malaysia) Muhammad Syazwan Yusoff	(Malaysia) Melaka United (loan)
	(Malaysia) Faizol Nazlin Sayuti	(Malaysia) MOF F.C. (loan)
	(Malaysia) Mohd Fitri Omar	(Malaysia) Penang FA
	(Malaysia) Muhd Nazri Ahmad	(Malaysia) Sabah FA
	(Malaysia) Syahrul Azwari Ibrahim	(Malaysia) Sarawak FA (loan)
	(Malaysia) Amirizdwan Taj Tajuddin	(Malaysia) Terengganu FA
	(Malaysia) Tuan Muhamad Faim	(Malaysia) MOF F.C. (loan)
	(Malaysia) Rozaimi Azwar	(Malaysia) MOF F.C. (loan)

=== Pahang FA ===
==== Transfers In ====
Pos.	Name	From
	(Slovenia) Nejc Potokar	(Croatia) NK Slaven Belupo
	(Argentina) Germán Pacheco	(Peru) Juan Aurich
	(Slovenia) Dalibor Volaš	(Slovenia) NK Maribor
	(Malaysia) M. Kogileswaran Raj	(Malaysia) Harimau Muda C
	(Malaysia) Muhd Shah Amirul Mohd Zamri	(Malaysia) Harimau Muda C
	(Malaysia) R. Dinesh	(Malaysia) Harimau Muda C
	(Malaysia) Muhd Helmi Abdullah	(Malaysia) Shahzan Muda F.C.
	(Malaysia) Mohd Daniel Wafiuddin Sadun	(Malaysia) Pahang F.C. U21
	(Malaysia) Mohd Faizal Abdul Rani	(Malaysia) Pahang F.C. U21
	(Malaysia) Mohd Ridhwan Maidin	(Malaysia) Pahang F.C. U21
	(Malaysia) Muhd Amirul Kasmuri	(Malaysia) Pahang F.C. U21
	(Malaysia) Muhd Ashar Al-Aafiz Abdullah	(Malaysia) Pahang F.C. U21
	(Malaysia) Muhd Nor Azam Abdul Azih	(Malaysia) Pahang F.C. U21
	(Malaysia) Mohd Faisal Abdul Halim	(Malaysia) Penang FA U21
	(Malaysia) A. Salomon Raj	(Malaysia) Selangor FA U21

==== Transfers Out ====
Pos.	Name	To
	(Argentina) Matías Conti	(Chile) C.D. Universidad de Concepción
	(Malaysia) Mohd Azamuddin Md Akil	(Malaysia) Johor Darul Takzim F.C.
	(Malaysia) Azidan Sarudin	(Malaysia) Kuala Lumpur FA
	(Malaysia) Mohammad Abdul Aziz Ismail	(Malaysia) Melaka United
	(Malaysia) Mohd Hazri Rozali	(Malaysia) Melaka United
	(Malaysia) Muhammad Syawal Norsam	(Malaysia) Melaka United
	(Malaysia) R. Surendran	(Malaysia) Melaka United
	(Malaysia) Mohd Zaiza Zainal Abidin	(Malaysia) PKNS F.C.
	(Malaysia) Khairul Azhan Khalid	(Malaysia) Selangor FA
	(Malaysia) Mohd Hafiz Kamal	(Malaysia) Selangor FA
	(Malaysia) Mohd Razman Roslan	(Malaysia) Selangor FA
	(Malaysia) R. Gopinathan	(Malaysia) Selangor FA
	(Jamaica) Damion Stewart	
	(Nigeria) Dickson Nwakaeme	
	(Malaysia) Jalaluddin Jaafar	RETIRED

=== PDRM FA ===
==== Transfers In ====
Pos.	Name	From
	(Singapore) Safuwan Baharudin	(Singapore) LionsXII
	(Brazil) Andrezinho	(Sudan) Al-Hilal Club (Omdurman)
	(Mali) Souleymane Konaté	(Sudan) Al-Hilal Club (Omdurman)
	(Malaysia) K. Reuben	(Malaysia) ATM FA
	(Malaysia) Arvind Juresinggam	(Malaysia) NS Matrix F.C.
	(Malaysia) Abdul Latiff Suhaimi	(Malaysia) Felda United F.C.
	(Malaysia) Qhairul Anwar Roslani	(Malaysia) Felda United F.C.
	(Malaysia) Mohd Hazsyafiq Hamzah	(Malaysia) Johor Darul Ta'zim II F.C.
	(Malaysia) Zulfadhli Mohamed	(Malaysia) Johor Darul Ta'zim II F.C.
	(Malaysia) Mohd Razif Abdul Rahim	(Malaysia) PBAPP FC
	(Malaysia) Muhammad Shafiq Jamal	(Malaysia) Sabah FA
	(Malaysia) Muhd Izuan Salahuddin	(Malaysia) Sabah FA
	(Malaysia) Mohd Faizal Muhammad	(Malaysia) T–Team F.C.
	(Malaysia) Aiman Syazwan Abdullah	(Malaysia) UiTM F.C.
	(Malaysia) Muhd Safwan Hashim	(Malaysia) ATM FA U21
	(Malaysia) Amir Saiful Badeli	(Malaysia) PDRM FA U21
	(Malaysia) Muhamad Syauki Abdul Wahab	(Malaysia) PDRM FA U21
	(Malaysia) Christopher Keli	?
	(Malaysia) Mohd Hamdan Sairi	?

==== Transfers Out ====
Pos.	Name	To
	(Mali) Dramane Traore	(Malaysia) Kelantan FA
	(The Gambia) Mohamadou Sumareh	(Malaysia) Perlis FA
	(Malaysia) Ahmad Ezrie Shafizie Sazali	(Malaysia) Felda United F.C.
	(Malaysia) Mohd Faizal Abu Bakar	(Malaysia) Kelantan FA
	(Malaysia) Badrulzaman Abdul Halim	(Malaysia) Kuala Lumpur FA
	(Malaysia) Isma Alif Mohd Salim	(Malaysia) Kuala Lumpur FA
	(Malaysia) Mohd Fadhil Mohd Hashim	(Malaysia) Kuala Lumpur FA
	(Malaysia) Arman Fareez Ali	(Malaysia) Perlis FA
	(Malaysia) Mohd Afif Amiruddin	(Malaysia) Perlis FA
	(Malaysia) Mohd Alafi Mahmud	(Malaysia) Perlis FA
	(Malaysia) Mohd Fauzi Abdul Majid	(Malaysia) Perlis FA
	(Malaysia) Saiful Amar Sudar	(Malaysia) Perlis FA
	(Malaysia) V. Thirumurugan	(Malaysia) Perlis FA
	(Malaysia) Shahurain Abu Samah	(Malaysia) PKNS F.C.
	(Malaysia) Muhd Asyidi Dil Ashar Yusof	(Malaysia) UKM F.C.
	(Timor-Leste) Jaime Bragança	
	(Malaysia) Muhd Eskandar Ismail	

=== Penang FA ===
==== Transfers In ====
Pos.	Name	From
	(Australia) Brent Griffiths	(Australia) Central Coast Mariners FC
	(Argentina) Matías Córdoba	(El Salvador) Alianza F.C.
	(Nigeria) Osas Saha	(Indonesia) Perseru Serui
	(Malaysia) Mohd Fauzan Dzulkifli	(Malaysia) Felda United F.C.
	(Malaysia) Mohd Faizat Ghazli	(Malaysia) Harimau Muda
	(Malaysia) S. Kumaahran	(Malaysia) Harimau Muda
	(Malaysia) Muhammad Jafri Muhammad Firdaus Chew	(Malaysia) Harimau Muda C
	(Malaysia) Mohd Firdaus Muhamad	(Malaysia) Kedah FA
	(Malaysia) Mohd Fitri Omar	(Malaysia) Kelantan FA
	(Malaysia) Muhd Nursalam Zainal Abidin	(Malaysia) UiTM F.C.
	(Malaysia) Mohd Ikhmal Ibrahim	(Malaysia) Penang FA U21

==== Transfers Out ====
Pos.	Name	To
	(South Korea) Lee Kil-hoon	(Malaysia) Sime Darby F.C.
	(Malaysia) Azinee Taib	(Malaysia) Johor Darul Takzim F.C.
	(Malaysia) See Kok Luen	(Malaysia) Melaka United
	(Malaysia) Mohd Farid Ramli	(Malaysia) PKNS F.C.
	(Malaysia) Mohd Remezey Che Ros	(Malaysia) PKNS F.C.
	(Malaysia) Yong Kuong Yong	(Malaysia) Terengganu FA
	(Malaysia) Mohd Junaidi Shafiai	(Malaysia) Penang FA U21
	(Brazil) Beto Gonçalves	
	(Brazil) Hilton Moreira	

=== Perak FA ===
==== Transfers In ====
Pos.	Name	From
	(Liberia) Erick Weeks Lewis	(Indonesia) Pusamania Borneo FC
	(Brazil) Elias	(South Korea) Busan IPark
	(Uzbekistan) Vokhid Shodiev	(Uzbekistan) FC Bunyodkor
	(Malaysia) Fazrul Hazli Kadri	(Malaysia) ATM FA
	(Malaysia) Shahrul Mohd Saad	(Malaysia) Felda United F.C.
	(Malaysia) Azrul Nizam Muhamad	(Malaysia) Harimau Muda
	(Malaysia) D. Kenny Pallraj	(Malaysia) Harimau Muda
	(Malaysia) Nazirul Naim Che Hashim	(Malaysia) Harimau Muda
	(Malaysia) Muhd Hafizul Hakim Khairul Nizam	(Malaysia) Malacca United S.A.
	(Malaysia) G. Mugenthiran	(Malaysia) Sungai Ara F.C. (LOAN RETURN)
	(Malaysia) Fikri Sudin	(Malaysia) Perak FA U21
	(Malaysia) Khairul Ashraf Sahizah	(Malaysia) Perak FA U21
	(Malaysia) Muhammad Syazani Mat Puat	(Malaysia) Perak FA U21
	(Malaysia) Raffi Nagoorgani	(Malaysia) Perak FA U21
	(Malaysia) Muhd Rafiq Faeez Muhd Fuad	FREE AGENT

==== Transfers Out ====
Pos.	Name	To
	(Brazil) Charles Chad	(Brazil) Associação Desportiva Cabofriense
	(Jamaica) Horace James	(Vietnam) SHB Đà Nẵng F.C.
	(Malaysia) Bobby Gonzales	(Malaysia) Felda United F.C.
	(Malaysia) Mohd Idris Ahmad	(Malaysia) Felda United F.C.
	(Malaysia) Muhammad Tuah Iskandar Jamaluddin	(Malaysia) Johor Darul Ta'zim II F.C.
	(Malaysia) Azizon Abdul Kadir	(Malaysia) Perlis FA
	(Malaysia) Azmizi Azmi	(Malaysia) Perlis FA
	(Malaysia) Sumardi Hajalan	(Malaysia) Perlis FA
	(Malaysia) G. Mugenthiran	(Malaysia) PKNP F.C.
	(Malaysia) Hairol Fazreen Abu Hassan	(Malaysia) PKNP F.C.
	(Malaysia) Hamizul Izaidi Zulkifli	(Malaysia) PKNP F.C.
	(Malaysia) S. Vikneswaren	(Malaysia) PKNP F.C.
	(South Korea) Namkung Woong	
	(Malaysia) Haris Safwan Kamal	

=== Sarawak FA ===
==== Transfers In ====
Pos.	Name	From
	(Timor-Leste) Juninho	(Brazil) Avaí FC
	(Italy) Davide Grassi	(Romania) FC Rapid București
	(Australia) Ndumba Makeche	(Malaysia) Felda United F.C.
	(Brazil) Gilmar	(Malaysia) Kelantan FA
	(Malaysia) Mohd Riduwan Ma'on	(Malaysia) ATM FA
	(Malaysia) Syahrul Azwari Ibrahim	(Malaysia) Kelantan FA (loan)
	(Malaysia) Mohd Akmal Mohd Noor	(Malaysia) NS Matrix F.C.
	(Malaysia) K. Gurusamy	(Malaysia) Selangor FA
	(Malaysia) K. Thanaraj	(Malaysia) Selangor FA
	(Malaysia) Mohd Shahril Saa'ri	(Malaysia) T–Team F.C.
	(Malaysia) Florian Rison Laes	(Malaysia) Sarawak FA U21
	(Malaysia) Mohd Alif Hassan	(Malaysia) Sarawak FA U21
	(Malaysia) Mohd Hafis Saperi	(Malaysia) Sarawak FA U21

==== Transfers Out ====
Pos.	Name	To
	(Australia) Ryan Griffiths	(Hong Kong) South China AA
	(Republic of Ireland) Billy Mehmet	(Singapore) Tampines Rovers FC
	(Malaysia) Mohd Nazri Mohd Kamal	(Malaysia) DRB-Hicom F.C.
	(Malaysia) A. Varathan	(Malaysia) Megah Murni F.C.
	(Malaysia) G. Mahathevan	(Malaysia) Megah Murni F.C.
	(Malaysia) Sabri Sahar	(Malaysia) NS Matrix F.C.
	(Malaysia) Mohd Fadzley Rahim	(Malaysia) Sabah FA
	(Malaysia) Joseph Kalang Tie	(Malaysia) Terengganu FA
	(Liberia) Patrick Gerhardt	
	(Montenegro) Ivan Fatic	
	(Malaysia) Ikhwan Izzat Jamaludin	
	(Malaysia) Aidil Mohammad	RETIRED

=== Selangor FA ===
==== Transfers In ====
Pos.	Name	From
	(Argentina) Mauro Olivi	(Peru) León de Huánuco
	(Liberia) Patrick Wleh	(Malaysia) PKNS F.C. (loan)
	(Malaysia) Zarif Irfan Hashimuddin	(Malaysia) AirAsia Football Club
	(Malaysia) Adam Nor Azlin	(Malaysia) Harimau Muda
	(Malaysia) R. Gopinathan	(Malaysia) Pahang FA
	(Malaysia) Khairul Azhan Khalid	(Malaysia) Pahang FA
	(Malaysia) Mohd Hafiz Kamal	(Malaysia) Pahang FA
	(Malaysia) Mohd Razman Roslan	(Malaysia) Pahang FA

==== Transfers Out ====
Pos.	Name	To
	(Brazil) Guilherme de Paula	(Cyprus) Ethnikos Achna FC
	(Malaysia) A. Thamil Arasu	(Malaysia) Kuala Lumpur FA
	(Malaysia) Mohd Afiq Azmi	(Malaysia) NS Matrix F.C.
	(Malaysia) Mohd Shazlan Alias	(Malaysia) NS Matrix F.C.
	(Malaysia) K. Gurusamy	(Malaysia) Sarawak FA
	(Malaysia) K. Thanaraj	(Malaysia) Sarawak FA
	(Brazil) Leandro Dos Santos	
	(Malaysia) Muhd Syamim Othman	
	(Malaysia) Mohd Hamsani Ahmad	RETIRED

=== Terengganu FA ===
==== Transfers In ====
Name	From
(Argentina) Juan José Morales	(Argentina) All Boys
(Malaysia) Affize Faisal	(Malaysia) ATM FA
(Malaysia) Hairuddin Omar	(Malaysia) ATM FA
(Malaysia) Amirizdwan Taj	(Malaysia) Kelantan FA
(Malaysia) Yong Kuong Yong	(Malaysia) Penang FA
(Malaysia) Joseph Kalang Tie	(Malaysia) Sarawak FA
(Malaysia) Amierul Hakimi Awang	(Malaysia) Terengganu FA U21
(Malaysia) Amirul Syahmi Asha'ri	(Malaysia) Terengganu FA U21

==== Transfers Out ====
Name	To
(Brazil) Paulo Rangel	(Malaysia) Johor Darul Ta'zim II F.C.
(Malaysia) Hafidz Romly	(Malaysia) DRB-Hicom F.C.
(Malaysia) Abdul Manaf Mamat	(Malaysia) Kelantan FA
(Malaysia) Ahmad Azlan Zainal	(Malaysia) Kuala Lumpur FA
(Malaysia) Helmi Remeli	(Malaysia) Kuala Lumpur FA
(Malaysia) Khairul Ramadhan Zauwawi	(Malaysia) PKNS F.C.
(Malaysia) Radhi Yusof	(Malaysia) T-Team F.C.
(Malaysia) Khairul Rosmadi	(Malaysia) Hanelang F.C.
(Malaysia) Muhaimin Omar	

=== T-Team F.C. ===
==== Transfers In ====
Pos.	Name	From
	(Brazil) Patrick Cruz	(Indonesia) Mitra Kukar F.C.
	(Mali) Makan Konaté	(Indonesia) Persib Bandung
	(Nepal) Rohit Chand	(Indonesia) Persija Jakarta
	(Mali) Abdoulaye Maïga	(Indonesia) Sriwijaya
	(Malaysia) Mohd Naim Zakaria	(Malaysia) Harimau Muda
	(Malaysia) Muhd Akhir Bahari	(Malaysia) Harimau Muda
	(Malaysia) Ilham Amirullah Razali	(Malaysia) Harimau Muda
	(Malaysia) Wan Ahmad Amirzafran Wan Nadris	(Malaysia) Harimau Muda
	(Malaysia) Muhd Radhi Yusof	(Malaysia) Terengganu
	(Malaysia) Abdullah Suleiman	(Malaysia) Terengganu U21
	(Malaysia) Muhamad Zulhanizam Shafine	(Malaysia) T–Team U21
	(Uzbekistan) Dilshod Sharofetdinov	FREE AGENT
	(Malaysia) Ramzi Sufian	FREE AGENT

==== Transfers Out ====
Pos.	Name	To
	(Malaysia) Muhammad Azmi Hamzah	(Malaysia) DRB-Hicom F.C.
	(Malaysia) Mohd Rosdi Zakaria	(Malaysia) Kuala Lumpur FA
	(Malaysia) Nik Zul Aziz Nawawi	(Malaysia) Kuala Lumpur FA
	(Malaysia) Mohd Faizal Muhammad	(Malaysia) PDRM FA
	(Malaysia) Mohd Shahril Saa'ri	(Malaysia) Sarawak FA
	(Croatia) Josip Milardovic	
	(Croatia) Tomislav Bušić	
	(Nepal) Rohit Chand	
	(Uzbekistan) Farhod Tadjiyev	
	(Uzbekistan) Sadriddin Abdullaev	(Uzbekistan) Lokomotiv Tashkent FK
	(Malaysia) Mohd Faizuddin Manjur Ahmad	
	(Malaysia) Nuraliff Zainal Abidin	
	(Malaysia) Syam Shahril Ghulam	

== Malaysia Premier League ==
The 2016 Malaysia Premier League (Malaysian language: Liga Perdana Malaysia 2016) is the 13th season of the Malaysia Premier League since its inception in 2004. 12 teams participated in the league with Kedah as the reigning champions and currently play in the top flight of Malaysian football, Malaysia Super League.

The season started on 12 February and concluded on 21 October 2016.

=== ATM FA ===
==== Transfers In ====
Pos.	Name	From
	(Malaysia) Faizul Azlie Saad	(Malaysia) Royal Malay Force Regiment FC
	(Malaysia) Mohd Syafez Mohamad	(Malaysia) Royal Malay Force Regiment FC
	(Malaysia) Mohd Zabeel Mat Noor	(Malaysia) Royal Malay Force Regiment FC
	(Malaysia) Muhd Faiz Ibrahim	(Malaysia) Royal Malay Force Regiment FC
	(Malaysia) Mohd Syukri Mat Hamidi	(Malaysia) Tentera Darat F.C.
	(Malaysia) Muhd Iqbal Shah Taufik	(Malaysia) Tentera Darat F.C.
	(Malaysia) Muhd Tauffik Mat Radi	(Malaysia) Tentera Darat F.C.
	(Malaysia) Megat Hasliq Fitri Mohd Hasni	(Malaysia) Tentera Laut F.C.
	(Malaysia) Mohd Azim Faris Shari	(Malaysia) Tentera Laut F.C.
	(Malaysia) Muhd Zamri Yusuf	(Malaysia) Tentera Laut F.C.
	(Malaysia) Izzat Zaini	(Malaysia) Tentera Udara F.C.
	(Malaysia) Mohd Zaironi Yusof	(Malaysia) Tentera Udara F.C.
	(Malaysia) Mohd Rafizol Roslan	(Malaysia) ATM FA U21
	(Malaysia) Mohd Shahrizan Syafiq Adzman	(Malaysia) ATM FA U21
	(Malaysia) Muhammad Amirul Husin	(Malaysia) ATM FA U21
	(Malaysia) Muhd Aifaa Mat Baliya	(Malaysia) ATM FA U21
	(Malaysia) Abdul Rashid Mahmud	(Malaysia) Tentera Laut F.C.
	(Malaysia) Ammar Roomai	
	(Malaysia) Zainal Jakaria	(Malaysia) Tentera Laut F.C.

==== Transfers Out ====
Pos.	Name	To
	(Honduras) Jerry Palacios	(Honduras) C.D. Real Sociedad
	(Australia) Mario Karlovic	(Malaysia) Kuala Lumpur FA
	(Nigeria) Obinna Nwaneri	(Malaysia) Perlis FA
	(Malaysia) Abdul Shukur Jusoh	(Malaysia) Felda United F.C.
	(Malaysia) Norfazly Alias	(Malaysia) Felda United F.C.
	(Malaysia) Azmeer Yusof	(Malaysia) Kedah FA
	(Malaysia) Razi Effendi Suhit	(Malaysia) MOF F.C.
	(Malaysia) Syed Adney	(Malaysia) NS Matrix F.C.
	(Malaysia) K. Reuben	(Malaysia) PDRM FA
	(Malaysia) Fazrul Hazli Kadri	(Malaysia) Perak FA
	(Malaysia) Muhammad Azreen Zulkafli	(Malaysia) PKNS F.C.
	(Malaysia) S. Thinagaran	(Malaysia) PKNS F.C.
	(Malaysia) Yusaini Hafiz Che Saad	(Malaysia) PKNS F.C.
	(Malaysia) Mohd Riduwan Ma'on	(Malaysia) Sarawak FA
	(Malaysia) Hairuddin Omar	(Malaysia) Terengganu FA
	(Malaysia) Mohd Affize Faisal Mamat	(Malaysia) Terengganu FA
	(Nigeria) Abdulafees Abdulsalam	

=== DRB-Hicom FC ===
==== Transfers In ====
Pos.	Name	From
	(Denmark) Philip Lund	(Faroe Islands) B36 Tórshavn
	(South Korea) Kim Jin-yong	(Malaysia) NS Matrix F.C.
	(Malaysia) K. Sathiya	(Malaysia) AirAsia F.C.
	(Malaysia) Mohd Arip Amiruddin	(Malaysia) PKNS F.C.
	(Malaysia) A. Puvanarajah	(Malaysia) Real Mulia F.C.
	(Malaysia) M. Yoganathan	(Malaysia) Real Mulia F.C.
	(Malaysia) Nazri Kamal	(Malaysia) Sarawak FA
	(Malaysia) Hafidz Romly	(Malaysia) Terengganu FA
	(Malaysia) Muhammad Azmi Hamzah	(Malaysia) T–Team F.C.
	(Malaysia) Mohd Hafiz Abu Bakar	(Malaysia) UiTM F.C.
	(Malaysia) Hairil Irwan Jamaludin	(Malaysia) Young Fighters F.C.
	(Malaysia) Nasrullah Haniff Johan	(Malaysia) Young Fighters F.C.
	(Malaysia) Mohd Khairul Asyraf Ramli	(Malaysia) Felda United F.C. U21
	(Malaysia) Mohd Faizal Mansor	
	(Malaysia) Muhammad Zikri Kamaruzaman	

==== Transfers Out ====
Pos.	Name	To
	(Malaysia) Khairul Naim Mahyuddin	(Malaysia) AirAsia F.C.
	(Malaysia) Hasrul Abu Bakar	(Malaysia) Megah Murni F.C.
	(Malaysia) Ahmad Shahir Ismail	(Malaysia) Melaka United
	(Malaysia) Mohd Aris Zaidi	(Malaysia) MOF F.C.
	(Malaysia) Muhd Afiq Amsyar Salamat	(Malaysia) PKNP F.C.
	(Malaysia) Mohd Fakhrullah Rosli	(Malaysia) SAMB FC
	(Japan) Terukazu Tanaka	(Thailand) Ang Thong F.C.
	(Japan) Hayato Hashimoto	RETIRED

=== Johor Darul Ta'zim II ===
==== Transfers In ====
Name	From
(Brazil) Paulo Rangel	(Malaysia) Terengganu FA
(Malaysia) Stuart Wark	(Australia) Albany Creek Excelsior FC
(Malaysia) Shazalee Ramlee	(Australia) Balcatta FC
(Malaysia) Curran Singh Ferns	(Australia) Brisbane City FC
(Malaysia) Nick Swirad	(Australia) Northern Rangers FC
(Malaysia) Daniel Ting	(England) Droylsden F.C.
(Malaysia) Samuel Sommerville	(England) Tooting & Mitcham United
(Malaysia) Kevin Gunter	(Switzerland) FC Wiedikon
(Malaysia) Amirul Ikmal Hafiz	(Malaysia) Harimau Muda
(Malaysia) Dominic Tan Jun Jin	(Malaysia) Harimau Muda C
(Malaysia) Muhd Hafiy Haikal Ismail	(Malaysia) Harimau Muda C
(Malaysia) Muhammad Al-Hafiz	(Malaysia) Johor Darul Ta'zim F.C.
(Malaysia) Tuah Iskandar Jamaluddin	(Malaysia) Perak FA
(Malaysia) Mohd Fazli Paat	(Malaysia) Sabah FA
(Malaysia) Mohd Yazid Zaini	(Malaysia) Johor Darul Ta'zim F.C. U21
(Malaysia) Mohd Nurul Azwan Roya	FREE AGENT

==== Transfers Out ====
Name	To
(Argentina) Nicolás Delmonte	(Argentina) Club Sportivo Estudiantes
(Argentina) Leandro Velázquez	(Colombia) Deportivo Pasto
(Malaysia) K. Sasi Kumar	(Malaysia) Johor Darul Ta'zim F.C.
(Malaysia) Muhammad Akram Mahinan	(Malaysia) Johor Darul Ta'zim F.C.
(Malaysia) Na'im Nazmi Zainuddin	(Malaysia) Kuala Lumpur FA
(Malaysia) Afiff Aizad Azman	(Malaysia) NS Matrix F.C.
(Malaysia) Daniel Ting	(Malaysia) NS Matrix F.C. (loan)
(Malaysia) Kevin Gunter	(Malaysia) NS Matrix F.C. (loan)
(Malaysia) Hazsyafiq Hamzah	(Malaysia) PDRM FA
(Malaysia) Zulfadhli Mohamed	(Malaysia) PDRM FA
(Malaysia) Azuan Izam	(Malaysia) PBMM F.C.
(Malaysia) Izuan Jarudin	(Malaysia) Perlis FA

=== Kuala Lumpur FA ===
==== Transfers In ====
Pos.	Name	From
	(Brazil) Léo Carioca	(Brazil) Caxias Futebol Clube
	(Brazil) Casagrande	(Brazil) Salgueiro Atlético Clube
	(Australia) Mario Karlovic	(Malaysia) ATM FA
	(Malaysia) Mohd Rasyid Aya	(Malaysia) Felda United F.C.
	(Malaysia) Mohd Soffuan Tawil	(Malaysia) Felda United F.C.
	(Malaysia) Muhd Arif Mohd Anwar	(Malaysia) Harimau Muda
	(Malaysia) Muhd Irfan Zakaria	(Malaysia) Harimau Muda
	(Malaysia) Na'im Nazmi Zainuddin	(Malaysia) Johor Darul Ta'zim II F.C.
	(Malaysia) Azidan Sarudin	(Malaysia) Pahang F.C.
	(Malaysia) Badrulzaman Abdul Halim	(Malaysia) PDRM FA
	(Malaysia) Isma Alif Mohd Salim	(Malaysia) PDRM FA
	(Malaysia) Mohd Fadhil Mohd Hashim	(Malaysia) PDRM FA
	(Malaysia) Norhadi Ubaidillah	(Malaysia) PKNS F.C.
	(Malaysia) A. Thamil Arasu	(Malaysia) Selangor FA
	(Malaysia) Abdul Halim Zainal	(Malaysia) Sime Darby F.C.
	(Malaysia) Fahrul Razi Kamaruddin	(Malaysia) Sime Darby F.C.
	(Malaysia) Mohd Shoufiq Khusaini	(Malaysia) Sime Darby F.C.
	(Malaysia) Mohd Rosdi Zakaria	(Malaysia) T-Team F.C.
	(Malaysia) Nik Zul Aziz Nawawi	(Malaysia) T-Team F.C.
	(Malaysia) Ahmad Azlan Zainal	(Malaysia) Terengganu FA
	(Malaysia) Helmi Remeli	(Malaysia) Terengganu FA
	(Malaysia) Muhd Nurikhwan Mohd Ismail	(Malaysia) Kuala Lumpur FA U21
	(Malaysia) Muhd Hafiz Mohd Johar	(Malaysia) Selangor FA U21 (loan)
	(Malaysia) Muhd Hardee Shamsuri	(Malaysia) Selangor FA U21 (loan)
	(Malaysia) Zaiful Abdul Hakim	(Malaysia) Selangor FA U21 (loan)
	(Malaysia) Zhafri Yahya	(Malaysia) Selangor FA U21 (loan)
	(Malaysia) Muhd Syamim Ramli	

==== Transfers Out ====
Name	To
(Malaysia) Fairuz Abdul Aziz	(Malaysia) AirAsia F.C.
(Malaysia) Mohd Fitri Kamal	(Malaysia) DBKL F.C.
(Malaysia) Muhd Shamirul Rani	(Malaysia) Ipoh FA
(Malaysia) Muhaimin Mohamad	(Malaysia) PKNS F.C.
(Malaysia) Pritam Singh	(Malaysia) Emkay-NPNG F.C.
(Malaysia) Mohd Hafiz Arbaen	(Malaysia) Emkay-NPNG F.C.
(Malaysia) Muhd Syazwan Rani	(Malaysia) Emkay-NPNG F.C.
(South Korea) Choi Hyun-yeon	(Uzbekistan) Navbahor Namangan
(South Korea) Lee Jin-Seuk	
(South Korea) Lee Sung-Hyun	
(Malaysia) Benedict Martin	
(Malaysia) Hattaphon Bun An	
(Malaysia) Fariss Azlan Mat Isa	
(Malaysia) Muhd Zameer Zainun	
(Malaysia) Lukhman Noor Hakim Jaafar	
(Malaysia) Muhd Khairil Amri Abdul Khodir	
(Malaysia) Ahmad Jihad Ismail	
(Malaysia) Farouk Hashim	
(Malaysia) J. Mughilan Kartik	
(Malaysia) Mohd Fazilidin Khalid	
(Malaysia) Mohd Zaidi Razlee	
(Malaysia) Nicholas Chan	
(Malaysia) S. Sumindran	
(Malaysia) Romdhizat Jamian	

=== Kuantan FA ===
==== Transfers In ====
Pos.	Name	From
	(Croatia) Srdan Vidakovic	(Croatia) NK Sesvete
	(Serbia) Ljubo Baranin	(Serbia) FK Radnik Surdulica
	(Japan) Shunsuke Nakatake	(Singapore) Hougang United FC
	(Ivory Coast) Dao Bakary	(Malaysia) UiTM F.C.
	(Malaysia) Mohd Sheril Anuar Saini	(Malaysia) Kedah United F.C.
	(Malaysia) Mohd Zairi Hafiezi Idris	(Malaysia) Real Mulia F.C.
	(Malaysia) Muhd Rafizi Zahari	(Malaysia) Rompin F.C.
	(Malaysia) Iskandar Zulkarnain Ibrahim	(Malaysia) Shahzan Muda F.C.
	(Malaysia) Mohd Shafiq Razali	(Malaysia) Felda United F.C. U21
	(Malaysia) Khairul Nidzam Mohd Noor	(Malaysia) Pahang F.C. U21
	(Malaysia) Muhammad Nur Zhafri Zaini	(Malaysia) PDRM FA U21
	(Malaysia) Amer Syafeeq Aziz	
	(Malaysia) Izer Hamkha Haizal	
	(Malaysia) Hashim Shamsudin	

==== Transfers Out ====
Pos.	Name	To
	(Malaysia) Muhammad Fikri Elhan	(Malaysia) AirAsia F.C.
	(Malaysia) Muhammad Zamri Hassan	(Malaysia) AirAsia F.C.
	(Malaysia) Muhamad Firdaus Paris@Daris	(Malaysia) Felcra F.C.
	(Malaysia) Muhd Norhizwan Hassan	(Malaysia) PKNP F.C.
	(Malaysia) Muhamad Razren Mohd Jesni	(Malaysia) Shahzan Muda F.C.
	(Malaysia) Khairul Annas bin Ibrahim	(Malaysia) Pahang F.C. U21
	(Malaysia) Muhammad Afif Asyraf Mohd Zabawi	(Malaysia) UiTM F.C.
	(Malaysia) Muhd Helmi Mustaqim Mokhtar	(Malaysia) Shahzan Muda F.C.
	(Malaysia) Mohamad Fitry Kamal Ariffin	(Malaysia) PBMM F.C.
	(Malaysia) Muhd Asnan Awal Hisham	(Malaysia) PKNS FC U21
	(Malaysia) Muhd Norhafizani Jailani	(Malaysia) UiTM FC U21
	(Morocco) Tarik El Janaby	(Bangladesh) Abahani Limited (Chittagong)
	(Haiti) Fabrice Noël	(Bangladesh) Abahani Limited (Chittagong)
	(Malaysia) Judtanna a/l Eh Put	
	(Malaysia) Muszaki Abu Bakar	
	(Malaysia) Mohd Hanifuddin Abdul Rahman	
	(Montenegro) Milan Purovic	
	(South Korea) Lee Kwang-hyun	

=== Melaka United ===
==== Transfers In ====
Pos.	Name	From
	(Montenegro) Ilija Spasojevic	(Indonesia) Persib Bandung
	(South Korea) Shin Jae-pil	(Laos) Ezra F.C.
	(Montenegro) Balša Božović	(Montenegro) OFK Petrovac
	(Sweden) Labinot Harbuzi	(Sweden) KSF Prespa Birlik
	(Malaysia) Stefan Petrovski	(Australia) Sydney Olympic FC
	(Malaysia) Khair Jefri Jones	(New Zealand) Hawke's Bay United FC
	(Malaysia) Ahmad Shahir Ismail	(Malaysia) DRB-Hicom F.C.
	(Malaysia) Muhammad Syazwan Yusoff	(Malaysia) Kelantan FA
	(Malaysia) G. Puaneswaran	(Malaysia) NS Matrix F.C.
	(Malaysia) V. Kavi Chelvan	(Malaysia) NS Matrix F.C.
	(Malaysia) Mohammad Abdul Aziz Ismail	(Malaysia) Pahang F.C.
	(Malaysia) Mohd Hazri Rozali	(Malaysia) Pahang F.C.
	(Malaysia) Muhammad Syawal Norsam	(Malaysia) Pahang F.C.
	(Malaysia) R. Surendran	(Malaysia) Pahang F.C.
	(Malaysia) See Kok Luen	(Malaysia) Penang FA
	(Malaysia) Mohd Alif Shamsudin	(Malaysia) Sime Darby F.C.
	(Malaysia) R. Barath Kumar	(Malaysia) Young Fighters F.C.
	(Malaysia) Wan Amirul Afiq Wan Abdul Rahman	(Malaysia) Young Fighters F.C.

==== Transfers Out ====
Pos.	Name	To
	(Malaysia) Abdul Thaufik Abdul Haq	(Malaysia) AirAsia F.C.
	(Malaysia) Izzat Abdul Rahim	(Malaysia) AirAsia F.C.
	(Malaysia) Reeshafiq Alwi	(Malaysia) AirAsia F.C.
	(Malaysia) Billy Doliente	(Malaysia) DYS F.C.
	(Malaysia) Hafizan Talib	(Malaysia) Hanelang F.C.
	(Malaysia) Mohd Asif Mohd Azman	(Malaysia) MOF F.C.
	(Malaysia) Syafiq Azri Ahmad Kamal	(Malaysia) MOF F.C.
	(Malaysia) Muhd Hafizul Hakim Khairul Nizam	(Malaysia) Perak FA
	(Malaysia) Famirul Asyraf Sayuti	(Malaysia) Perlis FA
	(Malaysia) Muhd Zahiruddin Zulkifli	(Malaysia) PKNP F.C.
	(Malaysia) Rexjeson Pitrus	(Malaysia) Sabah FA
	(Malaysia) Mohd Azizan Baba	(Malaysia) SAMB F.C.
	(Malaysia) Mohd Zaidi Zubir	(Malaysia) SAMB F.C.
	(Malaysia) Muhd Sabri Adam	(Malaysia) SAMB F.C.
	(Malaysia) Rahmat Naemat	(Malaysia) SAMB F.C.
GK	(Australia) (Malaysia) Stefan Petrovski	Passed away
MF	(Malaysia) V. Kavi Chelvan	Free agent

=== NS Matrix FC ===
==== Transfers In ====
Pos.	Name	From
	(England) Alex Smith	(Australia) Far North Queensland FC
	(Australia) Andrew Nabbout	(Australia) Melbourne Victory FC
	(Australia) Taylor Regan	(Australia) Newcastle Jets FC
	(Australia) Joel Chianese	(Malaysia) Sabah FA
	(Malaysia) Syed Adney	(Malaysia) ATM FA
	(Malaysia) Mohd Nasriq Baharom	(Malaysia) Felda United F.C.
	(Malaysia) Annas Rahmat	(Malaysia) Harimau Muda
	(Malaysia) Mohd Ashmawi Yakin	(Malaysia) Harimau Muda
	(Malaysia) Shahrul Igwan Samsudin	(Malaysia) Harimau Muda
	(Malaysia) Afiff Aizad Azman	(Malaysia) Johor Darul Ta'zim II F.C.
	(Malaysia) Daniel Ting	(Malaysia) Johor Darul Ta'zim II F.C. (Loan)
	(Malaysia) Kevin Gunter	(Malaysia) Johor Darul Ta'zim II F.C. (Loan)
	(Malaysia) Mohd Norhafizzuan Jailani	(Malaysia) Putrajaya SPA F.C.
	(Malaysia) Sabri Sahar	(Malaysia) Sarawak FA
	(Malaysia) Mohd Afiq Azmi	(Malaysia) Selangor FA
	(Malaysia) Mohd Shazlan Alias	(Malaysia) Selangor FA
	(Malaysia) Khairul Anwar Shahrudin	(Malaysia) Sime Darby F.C.
	(Malaysia) R. Aroon Kumar	(Malaysia) Negeri Sembilan FA U21
	(Malaysia) Mohd Rahizi Mohd Rasib	(Malaysia) Negeri Sembilan FA U21
	(Malaysia) Muhammad Nizam Ruslan	(Malaysia) Negeri Sembilan FA U21
	(Malaysia) Hariri Mohd Safii	FREE AGENT

==== Transfers Out ====
Pos.	Name	To
	(South Korea) Kim Jin-yong	(Malaysia) DRB-Hicom F.C.
	(Liberia) Francis Doe	(Malaysia) Felda United F.C.
	(Haiti) Jean Alexandre	(United States) Fort Lauderdale Strikers
	(Malaysia) Khyril Muhymeen Zambri	(Malaysia) AirAsia Football Club
	(Malaysia) Azizi Matt Rose	(Malaysia) Felcra F.C.
	(Malaysia) Mohd Fazliata Taib	(Malaysia) Felcra F.C.
	(Malaysia) Shahrizal Saad	(Malaysia) Felcra F.C.
	(Malaysia) S. Sivanesan	(Malaysia) Felda United F.C.
	(Malaysia) G. Puaneswaran	(Malaysia) Melaka United
	(Malaysia) V. Kavi Chelvan	(Malaysia) Melaka United
	(Malaysia) Mohd Dzaiddin Zainuddin	(Malaysia) MOF F.C.
	(Malaysia) Rudie Ramli	(Malaysia) MOF F.C.
	(Malaysia) Ahmad Fauzi Saari	(Malaysia) Perlis FA
	(Malaysia) Mohd Akmal Mohd Nor	(Malaysia) Sarawak FA
	(Argentina) Bruno Martelotto	
	(Malaysia) Ahmad Hazeri Hamid	
	(Malaysia) Helmi Eliza Elias	
	(Malaysia) Irwan Fadzli Idrus	
	(Malaysia) Mohd Yatim Abdullah	
	(Malaysia) Rezal Zambery Yahya	
	(Malaysia) Mohd Fauzi Nan	RETIRED

=== Perlis FA ===
==== Transfers In ====
Pos.	Name	From
	(New Zealand) (Japan) Kayne Vincent	(Thailand) Buriram United F.C.
	(Nigeria) Obinna Nwaneri	(Malaysia) ATM FA
	(The Gambia) Mohamadou Sumareh	(Malaysia) PDRM FA
	(Malaysia) Muhd Elfie Elyaz Harizam	(Malaysia) Felcra F.C.
	(Malaysia) Izuan Jarudin	(Malaysia) Johor Darul Ta'zim II F.C.
	(Malaysia) Fandi Ahmad	(Malaysia) Johor Darul Ta'zim III F.C.
	(Malaysia) Sadam Hashim	(Malaysia) Kedah United F.C.
	(Malaysia) Famirul Asyraf Sayuti	(Malaysia) Melaka United
	(Malaysia) Ahmad Fauzi Saari	(Malaysia) Negeri Sembilan FA
	(Malaysia) Arman Fareez Ali	(Malaysia) PDRM FA
	(Malaysia) Mohd Afif Amiruddin	(Malaysia) PDRM FA
	(Malaysia) Mohd Alafi Mahmud	(Malaysia) PDRM FA
	(Malaysia) Mohd Fauzi Abdul Majid	(Malaysia) PDRM FA
	(Malaysia) Saiful Amar Sudar	(Malaysia) PDRM FA
	(Malaysia) V. Thirumurugan	(Malaysia) PDRM FA
	(Malaysia) Azizon Abdul Kadir	(Malaysia) Perak FA
	(Malaysia) Azmizi Azmi	(Malaysia) Perak FA
	(Malaysia) Sumardi Hajalan	(Malaysia) Perak FA
	(Malaysia) Mohd Ezaidy Khadar	(Malaysia) Sabah FA
	(Malaysia) Mohd Khairi Kiman	(Malaysia) Sabah FA
	(Malaysia) Mohd Firdaus Zulkaffli	(Malaysia) Perlis FA U21
	(Liberia) Edward Junior Wilson	

==== Transfers Out ====
Pos.	Name	To
	(Malaysia) Azi Shahril Azmi	(Malaysia) Felcra F.C.
	(Malaysia) Mohd Haziq Mu'iz Abdul	(Malaysia) Felcra F.C.
	(Malaysia) Mohd Ikmal Ibrahim	(Malaysia) Felcra F.C.
	(Malaysia) Mohd Shukor Azmi	(Malaysia) Felcra F.C.
	(Malaysia) Muhd Fakhrul Ikram Azahari	(Malaysia) Felcra F.C.

=== PKNS FC ===
==== Transfers In ====
Pos.	Name	From
	(Palestine) Matías Jadue	(Chile) Deportes Santa Cruz
	(Argentina) Juan Manuel Cobelli	(Peru) Club Deportivo Universidad César Vallejo
	(Malaysia) Muhd Azreen Zulkafli	(Malaysia) ATM FA
	(Malaysia) S. Thinagaran	(Malaysia) ATM FA
	(Malaysia) Yusaini Hafiz Chee Saad	(Malaysia) ATM FA
	(Malaysia) Ahmad Shakir Mohd Ali	(Malaysia) Kedah FA
	(Malaysia) Mohd Zaiza Zainal Abidin	(Malaysia) Pahang F.C.
	(Malaysia) Shahurain Abu Samah	(Malaysia) PDRM FA
	(Malaysia) Mohd Farid Ramli	(Malaysia) Penang FA
	(Malaysia) Mohd Remezey Che Ros	(Malaysia) Penang FA
	(Malaysia) Khairul Ramadhan Zauwawi	(Malaysia) Terengganu FA
	(Malaysia) K. Satish	(Malaysia) Selangor FA U21

==== Transfers Out ====
Pos.	Name	To
	(Liberia) Patrick Wleh	(Malaysia) Selangor FA (Loan)
	(Malaysia) Mohd Arip Amiruddin	(Malaysia) DRB-Hicom F.C.
	(Malaysia) Ibrahim Syaihul	(Malaysia) Felcra F.C.
	(Malaysia) Muhd Nor Ubaidullah Abdul Rahman	(Malaysia) Felcra F.C. (Loan)
	(Malaysia) Norhadi Ubaidillah	(Malaysia) Kuala Lumpur FA
	(Malaysia) Mohd Aminuddin Mohd Noor	(Malaysia) MOF F.C.
	(Malaysia) Mohd Zulharis Mohd Noor	(Malaysia) MOF F.C.
	(Malaysia) Ahmad Khuzaimi Piee	(Malaysia) SAMB F.C. (Loan)
	(Malaysia) Mohd Yusri Abas	(Malaysia) SAMB F.C. (Loan)
	(Malaysia) Mohd Faiz Isa	(Malaysia) Sime Darby F.C.
	(Timor-Leste) Pedro Henrique	(Thailand) Air Force Central F.C.

=== Sabah FA ===
==== Transfers In ====
Pos.	Name	From
	(Nigeria) Prince Nnake	(Egypt) Alassiouty Sport
	(Indonesia) Dedi Kusnandar	(Indonesia) Persib Bandung
	(Croatia) Igor Cerina	(Singapore) Tampines Rovers F.C.
	(Malaysia) Muhd Nazri Ahmad	(Malaysia) Kelantan FA
	(Malaysia) Rexjeson Pitrus	(Malaysia) Malacca United S.A.
	(Malaysia) Fadzley Abdul Rahim	(Malaysia) Sarawak FA
	(Malaysia) Radzi Mohd Hussin	University Malaysia Sabah F.C.
	(Malaysia) Rozaimi Rohim	(Malaysia) Young Fighters F.C.
	(Malaysia) Azzizan Nordin	(Malaysia) Sabah FA U21
	(Malaysia) Rawilson Batuil	(Malaysia) Sabah FA U21
	(Malaysia) Azwan Abd Fattah	(Malaysia) Sabah FA U21
	(Malaysia) Ummareng Bacok	(Malaysia) Sabah FA U21
	(Malaysia) Aldrian Agus	(Malaysia) Open Trial
	(Malaysia) Dendy Lowa	(Malaysia) Open Trial
	(Malaysia) Felexsius Amil	(Malaysia) Open Trial
	(Malaysia) Muhammad Azrie Basalie	(Malaysia) Open Trial
	(Malaysia) Ricco Nigel Milus	(Malaysia) Open Trial
	(Malaysia) Shafie Talib	(Malaysia) Open Trial
	(Brazil) Marco Tulio	–

==== Transfers Out ====
Pos.	Name	To
	(Libya) Éamon Zayed	(United States) Indy Eleven
	(Australia) Joel Chianese	(Malaysia) Negeri Sembilan FA
	(Malaysia) Didie Arizal Ibrahim	(Malaysia) AirAsia F.C.
	(Malaysia) R. Surendran	(Malaysia) Ipoh FA
	(Malaysia) Mohd Fazli Paat	(Malaysia) Johor Darul Ta'zim II F.C.
	(Malaysia) Rozaimi Abdul Rahman	(Malaysia) Johor Darul Ta'zim II F.C.
	(Malaysia) Endre S. Tipay	(Malaysia) KDMM F.C.
	(Malaysia) Rosdin Wasli	(Malaysia) KDMM F.C.
	(Malaysia) Zuraindey Jumai	(Malaysia) KDMM F.C.
	(Malaysia) Faizol Nazlin Sayuti	(Malaysia) Kelantan FA (loan return)
	(Malaysia) Mohd Rozaimi Azwar Mat Noor	(Malaysia) Kelantan FA (loan return)
	(Malaysia) Muhammad Shafiq Jamal	(Malaysia) PDRM FA
	(Malaysia) Muhd Izuan Salahuddin	(Malaysia) PDRM FA
	(Malaysia) Mohd Ezaidy Khadar	(Malaysia) Perlis FA
	(Malaysia) Mohd Khairi Kiman	(Malaysia) Perlis FA
	(Senegal) Abdoulaye Faye	
	(Senegal) El Hadji Diouf	
	(Malaysia) Hardy Charles Parsi	
	(Malaysia) Irwan Jamil	RETIRED

=== Sime Darby FC ===
==== Transfers In ====
Pos.	Name	From
	(South Korea) Ha Dae-won	(Indonesia) Bali United Pusam F.C.
	(Ivory Coast) Frédéric Pooda	(Laos) Lao Toyota F.C.
	(Croatia) Mateo Roskam	(Singapore) Tampines Rovers FC
	(South Korea) Lee Kil-hoon	(Malaysia) Penang FA
	(Malaysia) Mohd Faiz Isa	(Malaysia) PKNS F.C.
	(Malaysia) Mohd Faizal Aziz	(Malaysia) Shahzan Muda F.C.
	(Malaysia) Muhd Shazlan Abu Samah	(Malaysia) UiTM F.C.
	(Malaysia) Muhd Rizqi Azman	(Malaysia) Young Fighters F.C.
	(Malaysia) Muhd Firdaus Kasim	(Malaysia) NS Matrix U21
	(Malaysia) Mohd Azrin Roslan	(Malaysia) Penang FA U21
	(Malaysia) Akmal Zahir	(Malaysia) Sime Darby FC U21
	(Malaysia) Dzulfahmi Abdul Hadi	(Malaysia) Sime Darby FC U21
	(Malaysia) Faiz Hanif Adenan	(Malaysia) Sime Darby FC U21
	(Malaysia) Mohd Faridzuean Kamaruddin	(Malaysia) Sime Darby FC U21
	(Malaysia) Mohd Rafiq Shah Zaim	(Malaysia) Sime Darby FC U21
	(Malaysia) Nur Areff Kamaruddin	(Malaysia) Sime Darby FC U21
	(Malaysia) Syed Sobri Syed Mohamad	(Malaysia) Terengganu FA U21

==== Transfers Out ====
Pos.	Name	To
	(Australia) Reinaldo Mineiro	(Brazil) Operário Ferroviário Esporte Clube
	(Serbia) Marko Perović	(Brazil) Operário Ferroviário Esporte Clube
	(Serbia) Nemanja Vidakovic	(Serbia) OFK Beograd
	(Malaysia) Mohd Hafiszuan Salehuddin	(Malaysia) AirAsia Football Club
	(Malaysia) Mohd Fadzli Saari	(Malaysia) Felcra F.C.
	(Malaysia) Mohd Suffian Abdul Rahman	(Malaysia) Felda United F.C.
	(Malaysia) Abdul Halim Zainal	(Malaysia) Kuala Lumpur FA
	(Malaysia) Fahrul Razi Kamaruddin	(Malaysia) Kuala Lumpur FA
	(Malaysia) Mohd Shoufiq Khusaini	(Malaysia) Kuala Lumpur FA
	(Malaysia) Mohd Alif Shamsudin	(Malaysia) Melaka United
	(Malaysia) Yosri Derma Raju	(Malaysia) MISC-MIFA
	(Malaysia) Mohd Nizad Ayub	(Malaysia) MOF F.C.
	(Malaysia) Khairul Anwar Shahrudin	(Malaysia) NS Matrix F.C.
	(Malaysia) Saiful Hasnol Mohd Raffi	(Malaysia) UKM F.C.
	(Serbia) Ivan Dragicevic	
	(Malaysia) Eddy Helmi Abdul Manan	

=== UITM FC ===
==== Transfers In ====
Pos.	Name	From
	(Brazil) Eliel	(Bahrain) Busaiteen Club
	(Uzbekistan) Pavel Purishkin	(Kazakhstan) FC CSKA Almaty
	(Kyrgyzstan) Pavel Matyash	(Maldives) Maziya S&RC
	(South Korea) Kang Jin-wook	(South Korea) Seongnam FC
	(Malaysia) G. Rohan	(Malaysia) Megah Murni F.C.
	(Malaysia) Muhammad Afif Asyraf Mohd Zabawi	(Malaysia) Kuantan FA
	(Malaysia) Anwarul Hafiz Ahmad	
	(Malaysia) Mohammad Syahrizan Shukor	
	(Malaysia) Muhamad Fikri Ashaari	
	(Malaysia) Muhd Izman Solehin Rohadi	
	(Malaysia) Wafiq Wajdy	

==== Transfers Out ====
Pos.	Name	To
	(Ivory Coast) Dao Bakary	(Malaysia) Kuantan FA
	(Malaysia) Mohd Hafiz Abu Bakar	(Malaysia) DRB-Hicom F.C.
	(Malaysia) Muhd Farid Azmi	(Malaysia) Felcra F.C.
	(Malaysia) Muhd Hasnan Mat Isa	(Malaysia) Ipoh FA
	(Malaysia) Muhd Hazim Mohd Isa	(Malaysia) Ipoh FA
	(Malaysia) Ahmad Haziq Ahmad Fuad	(Malaysia) MOF F.C.
	(Malaysia) Aiman Syazwan Abdullah	(Malaysia) PDRM FA
	(Malaysia) Muhd Nursalam Zainal Abidin	(Malaysia) Penang FA
	(Malaysia) Muhd Shazlan Abu Samah	(Malaysia) Sime Darby F.C.
	(Malaysia) Muhd Zulkhairi Zulkeply	(Malaysia) UiTM F.C. U21
	(Malaysia) Ibrahim Aziz	(Malaysia) PBMM F.C.
	(Cameroon) Mbom Mbom Julien	
	(Tanzania) Abdi Kassim	
	(Malaysia) Mohamed Faridzuan Yusuf	
	(Malaysia) Mohd Hakim Zainol	
	(Malaysia) Mohd Hidayat Amaruddin	
	(Malaysia) Ibrahim Mohd Daniel	

== Malaysia FAM League ==
The 2016 Malaysia FAM League (referred to as the FAM League) is the 64th season of the FAM League since its establishment in 1952. The league is currently the third level football league in Malaysia. Malacca United S.A are the defending champions and currently play in the second level of Malaysian football, Malaysia Premier League.

=== AirAsia F.C. ===
==== Transfers In ====
Name	From
(Malaysia) Khairul Naim Mahyuddin	(Malaysia) DRB-Hicom F.C.
(Malaysia) Mohd Izaire Mohd Radzi	(Malaysia) Felcra F.C.
(Malaysia) Fairuz Abdul Aziz	(Malaysia) Kuala Lumpur FA
(Malaysia) Muhd Fikri Elhan	(Malaysia) Kuantan FA
(Malaysia) Muhd Zamri Hasan	(Malaysia) Kuantan FA
(Malaysia) Abdul Thaufik Abdul Haq	(Malaysia) Melaka United
(Malaysia) Izzat Abdul Rahim	(Malaysia) Melaka United
(Malaysia) Reeshafiq Alwi	(Malaysia) Melaka United
(Malaysia) S. Harivarman	(Malaysia) MISC-MIFA
(Malaysia) Zamri Morshidi	(Malaysia) MOF F.C.
(Malaysia) Khyril Muhymeen Zambri	(Malaysia) Negeri Sembilan FA
(Malaysia) Abdul Rahman Abdul Ghani	(Malaysia) Penjara F.C.
(Malaysia) Amirul Asyraf Jamaludin	(Malaysia) Penjara F.C.
(Malaysia) Fadzly Iskandar Adnan	(Malaysia) Putrajaya SPA F.C.
(Malaysia) Khairol Azry Abdul Rahman	(Malaysia) Putrajaya SPA F.C.
(Malaysia) Muzammer Mohd Zaki	(Malaysia) Putrajaya SPA F.C.
(Malaysia) Badrul Hisani Abdul Rahman	(Malaysia) Real Mulia F.C.
(Malaysia) Mohd Syamsuri Mustafa	(Malaysia) Real Mulia F.C.
(Malaysia) Muhd Ariff Zulkifly	(Malaysia) Real Mulia F.C.
(Malaysia) Didie Arizal Ibrahim	(Malaysia) Sabah FA
(Malaysia) Mohd Hafiszuan Salehuddin	(Malaysia) Sime Darby F.C.
(Malaysia) Mohd Faizwan Abdullah	(Malaysia) Kelantan FA U21
(Malaysia) Muhd Hazwan Rahman	

==== Transfers Out ====
Pos.	Name	To
	(Malaysia) K. Shathiya	(Malaysia) DRB-Hicom F.C.
	(Malaysia) Mohd Putra Alif Othman	(Malaysia) Ipoh FA
	(Malaysia) Muhd Hanis Kamaruddin	(Malaysia) Ipoh FA
	(Malaysia) Ilyaf Abdullah Sani	(Malaysia) Megah Murni F.C.
	(Malaysia) Muhd Zarif Irfan Hashimuddin	(Malaysia) Selangor FA
	(Malaysia) Muhd Halifi Roslan	(Malaysia) UiTM FC U21
	(Malaysia) Mohd Khairul Anuar Jamil	
	(Malaysia) Ahmad Shahidan Mohd Zuki	
	(Malaysia) Amir Shahreen Mubin	
	(Malaysia) Izuddin Mat	
	(Malaysia) K. Banbarsu	
	(Malaysia) Khairul Azahar Eidros	
	(Malaysia) Khushairi Aizad Jamalludin	
	(Malaysia) Mohd Firdaus Mohd Afandi	
	(Malaysia) Mohd Hilmi Rosli	
	(Malaysia) Mohd Norizam Salaman	
	(Malaysia) Mohd Shaari Mohd Jaafar	
	(Malaysia) Mohd Shahezad Ramli	
	(Malaysia) Mohd Shahrul Ramli	
	(Malaysia) Muhd Haikal Zol	
	(Malaysia) Muhd Nor Saiful Abdul Rahman	
	(Malaysia) Norismaidham Ismail	
	(Malaysia) Phul Sakh Lom	
	(Malaysia) Sharul Nizam Amiruddin	
	(Malaysia) Suvinart Shian	

=== D.Y.S F.C. ===
==== Transfers In ====
Pos.	Name	From
	(Malaysia) Datu Mohd Armin Datu Muhammad	(Malaysia) Sabah U21
	(Malaysia) Billy Doliente	(Malaysia) Melaka United
	(Malaysia) Mohd Ahzuan Khan Ahman	(Malaysia) Melaka United
	(Malaysia) Juffrey Omopor	(Malaysia) MOF F.C.
	(Malaysia) Hafizan Jahar	(Malaysia) Sabah U21
	(Malaysia) Mohd Shahrul Asmadin	(Malaysia) Sabah U21

==== Transfers Out ====
Entry date	Position	No	Player	From club	Fee

=== Felcra F.C. ===
==== Transfers In ====
Pos.	Name	From
	(Malaysia) Shahrulnizam Mustapa	(Malaysia) Felda United F.C.
	(Malaysia) Muhammad Firdaus Paris@Daris	(Malaysia) Kuantan FA
	(Malaysia) Azizi Matt Rose	(Malaysia) Negeri Sembilan FA
	(Malaysia) Mohd Fazliata Taib	(Malaysia) Negeri Sembilan FA
	(Malaysia) Shahrizal Saad	(Malaysia) Negeri Sembilan FA
	(Malaysia) Mohd Faiz Mohd Nasir	(Malaysia) PBAPP FC
	(Malaysia) Azi Shahril Azmi	(Malaysia) Perlis FA
	(Malaysia) Mohd Haziq Mu'iz Abdul	(Malaysia) Perlis FA
	(Malaysia) Mohd Ikmal Ibrahim	(Malaysia) Perlis FA
	(Malaysia) Mohd Shukor Azmi	(Malaysia) Perlis FA
	(Malaysia) Muhd Fakhrul Ikram Azahari	(Malaysia) Perlis FA
	(Malaysia) Wan Zulhilmi Wan Mustaffa	(Malaysia) Perlis FA
	(Malaysia) Ibrahim Syaihul	(Malaysia) PKNS F.C.
	(Malaysia) Muhd Nor Ubaidullah Abdul Rahman	(Malaysia) PKNS F.C.
	(Malaysia) Muhd Haikal Mohd Nazri	(Malaysia) Real Mulia F.C.
	(Malaysia) Muhammad Zamir Zaini	(Malaysia) Shahzan Muda F.C.
	(Malaysia) Mohd Fadzli Saari	(Malaysia) Sime Darby F.C.
	(Malaysia) Muhd Farid Azmi	(Malaysia) UiTM F.C.
	(Malaysia) Ahmad Azrul Azrie Ahmad Rushidi	(Malaysia) Young Fighters F.C.
	(Malaysia) Mohd Syafiq Azmi	(Malaysia) Perlis FA U21
	(Malaysia) Muhd Hafizi Mat Podzi	(Malaysia) Perlis FA U21

==== Transfers Out ====
Pos.	Name	To
	(Malaysia) Mohd Izaire Mohd Radzi	(Malaysia) AirAsia Football Club
	(Malaysia) Mohd Hazwan Zainun	(Malaysia) MISC-MIFA
	(Malaysia) Muhd Elfie Elyaz Harizam	(Malaysia) Perlis FA
	(Malaysia) Muhd Akid Ramli	(Malaysia) MPKB-BRI U-Bes F.C.
	(Malaysia) Muhd Hafizuddin Harun	(Malaysia) PKNP F.C.
	(Malaysia) Amirul Asraf Noor	(Malaysia) PKNP F.C.

=== Hanelang F.C. ===
==== Transfers In ====
Pos.	Name	From
	(Malaysia) Mohd Suhaimi Husin	(Malaysia) T-Team U21
	(Malaysia) Muhd Muslim Yusof	(Malaysia) Terengganu U21
	(Malaysia) Mohd Khairul Rosmadi	(Malaysia) Terengganu FA
	(Malaysia) Al-Imran Mohd Aziz	(Malaysia) Terengganu U21
	(Malaysia) Mohd Hasrol Syawal Hamid	(Malaysia) Real Mulia F.C.
	(Malaysia) Muhd Hafizan Talib	(Malaysia) Melaka United
	(Malaysia) Mohd Syazreen Mohd Suhaimi	(Malaysia) Young Fighters F.C.

==== Transfers Out ====
Pos.	Name	To
	(Malaysia) Mohd Asrul Zainudin	(Malaysia) SAMB F.C.
	(Malaysia) Mohd Naim Asraff Nordin	(Malaysia) Terengganu U21
	(Malaysia) Mohd Asysham Asri	(Malaysia) SAMB F.C.
	(Malaysia) Muhd Fazir Hikwan Mat Rani	(Malaysia) Terengganu U21
	(Malaysia) Che Ku Muhd Fakuwal Che Ku Azhar	

=== KDM FC ===
==== Transfers In ====
Pos.	Name	From
	(Malaysia) Endre S. Tipay	(Malaysia) Sabah FA
	(Malaysia) Josesua Jubin	(Malaysia) Sabah U21
	(Malaysia) Rosdin Wasli	(Malaysia) Sabah FA
	(Malaysia) Mohd Ashrafi Abdan	(Malaysia) Sabah U21
	(Malaysia) Zuraindey Jumai	(Malaysia) Sabah FA

==== Transfers Out ====
Entry date	Position	No	Player	From club	Fee

=== Ipoh FA ===
==== Transfers In ====
Pos.	Name	From
	(Malaysia) Mohd Putra Alif Othman	(Malaysia) AirAsia Football Club
	(Malaysia) Mohd Sirajuddin Isa	(Malaysia) JDT III
	(Malaysia) Muhd Hanis Kamaruddin	(Malaysia) AirAsia Football Club
	(Malaysia) Muhd Shamirul Rani	(Malaysia) Kuala Lumpur FA
	(Malaysia) Muhd Azwan Jatin	(Malaysia) Megah Murni F.C.
	(Malaysia) R. Surendran	(Malaysia) Sabah United FC
	(Malaysia) Muhd Hasnan Mat Isa	(Malaysia) UiTM F.C.
	(Malaysia) Muhd Hazim Mohd Isa	(Malaysia) UiTM F.C.
	(Malaysia) Muhd Ridzuan Kamalruzaman	(Malaysia) PBAPP FC
	(Malaysia) Muhd Ammar Abdul Aziz	(Malaysia) PKNS F.C. U21
	(Malaysia) Mohd Burhanuddin Mohd Noor	

==== Transfers Out ====
Pos.	Name	To
	(Malaysia) Chow Yuen Kwai	
	(Malaysia) G. Gobi	(Malaysia) MISC-MIFA
	(Malaysia) Lee Hon Loon	
	(Malaysia) Khairul Izwan Jamaludin	
	(Malaysia) Mohd Hafiz Saad	

=== Malaysia Malays F.C. ===
==== Transfers In ====
Pos.	Name	From
GK	(Malaysia) Hasrol Nizam Muhamat	(Malaysia) Sime Darby U21
GK	(Malaysia) Mohamad Fitry Kamal Ariffin	(Malaysia) Kuantan FA
GK	(Malaysia) Muhd Faiz Abdul Khalid	(Malaysia) Selangor U21
DC	(Malaysia) Mohd Iqbal Naim	(Malaysia) Negeri Sembilan U21
DR	(Malaysia) Azuan Izam	(Malaysia) JDT II
DC/DM	(Malaysia) Ibrahim Aziz	(Malaysia) UiTM F.C.
MC	(Malaysia) Mohd Zul Fakhri Zamri	(Malaysia) Pahang U19
AM	(Malaysia) Muhd Zainul Ariffin Idham	(Malaysia) KL U19
ST	(Malaysia) Mohd Hakim Zainal	(Malaysia) Young Fighters F.C.
DR	(Malaysia) Mohd Azhar Mohd Soom	(Malaysia) Negeri Sembilan U21
AML	(Malaysia) Aikal Aiman Azlan	(Malaysia) JDT U21
AML	(Malaysia) Muhd Arif Mohd Nor	(Malaysia) JDT III
ST	(Malaysia) Muhd Hazim Mohamad	(Malaysia) JDT III

==== Transfers Out ====
Entry date	Position	No	Player	From club	Fee

=== Megah Murni F.C. ===
==== Transfers In ====
Pos.	Name	From
	(Malaysia) Ilyaf Abdullah Sani	(Malaysia) AirAsia F.C.
	(Malaysia) Hasrul Abu Bakar	(Malaysia) DRB-Hicom F.C.
	(Malaysia) S. Murali	(Malaysia) MBSA F.C.
	(Malaysia) Mohd Noor Hafis Che Haron	(Malaysia) MOF F.C.
	(Malaysia) R. Mathivaanan	(Malaysia) Real Mulia F.C.
	(Malaysia) A. Varathan	(Malaysia) Sarawak FA
	(Malaysia) G. Mahathevan	(Malaysia) Sarawak FA
	(Malaysia) Darshen Ganesan Pillay	(Malaysia) PKNS U21
	(Malaysia) S. Ragunantharen	(Malaysia) PKNS U21
	(Malaysia) D. Naven	(Malaysia) Selangor U21
	(Malaysia) Muhd Syafiq Johari	
	(Malaysia) P. Paneerselvam	

==== Transfers Out ====
Pos.	Name	To
	(Malaysia) Muhd Azwan Jatin	(Malaysia) Ipoh FA
	(Malaysia) K. Ravindran	(Malaysia) MISC-MIFA
	(Malaysia) P. Haresh	(Malaysia) MISC-MIFA
	(Malaysia) Amir Omar Khata	(Malaysia) Sungai Ara F.C.
	(Malaysia) G. Rohan	(Malaysia) UiTM F.C.
	(Malaysia) Badrol Hanapi Ali	(Malaysia) UKM F.C.
	(Malaysia) A. Luveen Visnu	
	(Malaysia) Azuwan Abdul Rahman	
	(Malaysia) E. Lohindran	
	(Malaysia) Fazuan Abdullah	
	(Malaysia) K. Sivabalan	
	(Malaysia) M. Anbalagan	
	(Malaysia) M. Shathees	
	(Malaysia) Mohd Alif Haikal Ganaeson	
	(Malaysia) Mohd Iqbal Ibrahim Daud	
	(Malaysia) Mohd Supian Heri	
	(Malaysia) Muhd Noor Sulaimi Saidi	
	(Malaysia) S. Andrew	
	(Malaysia) V. Jeetendra	
	(Malaysia) Wan Mohd Azwari Wan Nor	

=== MISC-MIFA ===
==== Transfers In ====
Pos.	Name	From
GK	(Malaysia) V. Viknesh	(Malaysia)
DR	(Malaysia) S. Thiban Raj	(Malaysia) Kuala Lumpur U21
DL	(Malaysia) G. Thipenraj	(Malaysia) Kedah U19
DL	(Malaysia) V. Satheskumar	(Malaysia) Penang U21
MC	(Malaysia) M. Yoges	(Malaysia)
DMC	(Malaysia) M. Sathish	(Malaysia)
DMC	(Malaysia) Wan Ahmad Syukri	(Malaysia) Kedah United F.C.
AMR	(Malaysia) R. Puganeswaran	(Malaysia)
MC	(Malaysia) S. Uvarajen	(Malaysia)
MC	(Malaysia) Muhammad Sufie Noorazizan	(Malaysia) Sungai Ara F.C.
AMR	(Malaysia) S. Silambarasan	(Malaysia)
AML	(Malaysia) P. Haresh	(Malaysia) Megah Murni F.C.
AMLC/ST	(Malaysia) Ash Hameed	(Malaysia) Real Mulia F.C.
ST	(Malaysia) G. Gobi	(Malaysia) Ipoh FA
ST	(Malaysia) K. Ravindran	(Malaysia) PBAPP FC
ST	(Malaysia) Mohd Hazwan Zainun	(Malaysia) Felcra F.C.

==== Transfers Out ====
Pos.	Name	To
	(Malaysia) Ahmad Kamil Abdul Ghani	(Malaysia) SAMB F.C.
	(Malaysia) S. Harivarman	(Malaysia) AirAsia F.C.
	(Malaysia) Mohd Kefli Shamsudin	
	(Malaysia) Richard Nathan	
	(Malaysia) S. Pandiaraj	
	(Malaysia) S. Sadesh Kumar	
	(Malaysia) David Gunasingam	
	(Malaysia) Zulkifli Ismail	
	(Malaysia) R. Kumaraguru	
	(Malaysia) Mohd Afiq Akhmal Zunaidi	
	(Malaysia) M. Vivekananthan	
	(Malaysia) K. Depan Sakwati	
	(Malaysia) L. Rajesh	
	(Malaysia) Zaihisham Saad	
	(Malaysia) P. Ashwin	
	(Malaysia) S. Saravanakumar	
	(Malaysia) Zailam Mohamad	
	(Malaysia) L. Thanaraj	
	(Malaysia) Razali Umar Kandasamy	

=== MOF F.C. ===
==== Transfers In ====
Pos.	Name	From
	(Malaysia) Razi Effendi Suhit	(Malaysia) ATM FA
	(Malaysia) Mohd Aris Zaidi	(Malaysia) DRB-Hicom F.C.
	(Malaysia) Mohd Farizal Rozali	(Malaysia) Kedah United F.C.
	(Malaysia) Faizol Nazlin Sayuti	(Malaysia) Kelantan FA
	(Malaysia) Mohd Asif Mohd Azman	(Malaysia) Melaka United
	(Malaysia) Syafiq Azri Ahmad Kamal	(Malaysia) Melaka United
	(Malaysia) Mohd Dzaiddin Zainudin	(Malaysia) Negeri Sembilan FA
	(Malaysia) Rudie Ramli	(Malaysia) Negeri Sembilan FA
	(Malaysia) Mohd Aminuddin Mohd Noor	(Malaysia) PKNS F.C.
	(Malaysia) Mohd Zulharis Mohd Noor	(Malaysia) PKNS F.C.
	(Malaysia) Wan Mohd Alif Wan Jasmi	(Malaysia) Real Mulia F.C.
	(Malaysia) Mohd Nizad Ayub	(Malaysia) Sime Darby F.C.
	(Malaysia) Mohd Ailim Fahmi Kamaruddin	(Malaysia) Sungai Ara F.C.
	(Malaysia) Ahmad Haziq Ahmad Fuad	(Malaysia) UiTM F.C.
	(Malaysia) S. Vishnu Ruban Nair	(Malaysia) PKNS F.C. U21
	(Malaysia) Mohd Helmi Hariri Ibrahim	(Malaysia) Sime Darby F.C. U21
	(Malaysia) Solehin Kanasian Abdullah	
	(Malaysia) Noor Azharuddin Musa	?

==== Transfers Out ====
Pos.	Name	To
	(Malaysia) Zamri Morshidi	(Malaysia) AirAsia F.C.
	(Malaysia) Juffrey Omopor	(Malaysia) DYS F.C.
	(Malaysia) Mohd Noor Hafis Che Haron	(Malaysia) Megah Murni F.C.
	(Malaysia) Muhd Afham Zulkipeli	(Malaysia) Shahzan Muda F.C.
	(Malaysia) Mohd Saufi Ibrahim	(Malaysia) Sungai Ara F.C.
	(Malaysia) Wan Ahmad Hababa Wan Sharifuldin	(Malaysia) PDRM FA U21
	(Malaysia) Azrol Hisham Talib	
	(Malaysia) Mohd Hanif Mohd Noor	
	(Malaysia) Azman Zakaria	
	(Malaysia) Taufiq Shukor	
	(Malaysia) Mohd Faizul Abdullah	
	(Malaysia) Mohd Nur Firdaus Roswanan	
	(Malaysia) Mohd Shahrul Rizal Alha	
	(Malaysia) Muhd Azlan Nazri	
	(Malaysia) Hardi Jaafar	
	(Malaysia) Khairul Zal Azmi Zahinudden	
	(Malaysia) Mohd Azrin Azman	
	(Malaysia) Mohd Syafiq Mohd Zahari	
	(Malaysia) Muhd Syafiq Aiman Romly	

=== MPKB-BRI F.C. ===
==== Transfers In ====
Pos.	Name	From
GK	(Malaysia) Wan Mohd Faqih Mustafah	(Malaysia) Kelantan U21
DL	(Malaysia) Muhd Akmal Azlan	(Malaysia) Kuala Lumpur U21
DMC	(Malaysia) Khairan Ezuan Razali	(Malaysia) Real Mulia F.C.
AML	(Malaysia) Mohd Syazwan Fikry Mohd Husairi	(Malaysia) Kelantan U21
AMC	(Malaysia) Mohd Fahmi Izzuddin Mohd Lokeman	(Malaysia) Kelantan U21
AML	(Malaysia) Mohd Aminudin Mohd Yusoff	(Malaysia) Kelantan U21
AMR	(Malaysia) Muhd Akid Ramli	(Malaysia) Felcra F.C.
AMC	(Malaysia) Mohd Khairul Rizam Che Soh	(Malaysia) Kelantan U19
ST	(Malaysia) Mohd Farhan Yaacob	(Malaysia) UKM F.C.

=== SAMB FC ===
==== Transfers In ====
Pos.	Name	From
	(Malaysia) Mohd Asrul Zainudin	(Malaysia) Hanelang F.C.
	(Malaysia) Mohd Asysham Asri	(Malaysia) Hanelang F.C.
	(Malaysia) Mohd Syafizullah Abdul Wahab	(Malaysia) JDT III
	(Malaysia) Amirul Akmal Azman	(Malaysia) JDT III
	(Malaysia) Muhd Sabri Adam	(Malaysia) Melaka United
	(Malaysia) Rahmat Naemat	(Malaysia) Melaka United
	(Malaysia) Mohd Azizan Baba	(Malaysia) Melaka United
	(Malaysia) Mohd Zaidi Zubir	(Malaysia) Melaka United
	(Malaysia) Ahmad Khuzaimie Piee	(Malaysia) PKNS F.C. (Loan)
	(Malaysia) Mohd Yusri Abas	(Malaysia) PKNS F.C. (Loan)
	(Malaysia) Ahmad Kamil Ghani	(Malaysia) MISC-MIFA
	(Malaysia) Mohd Fakhrullah Rosli	(Malaysia) DRB-Hicom F.C.

==== Transfers Out ====
Entry date	Position	No	Player	From club	Fee

=== Penjara F.C. ===
==== Transfers In ====
Pos.	Name	From
	(Malaysia) Muhd Adli Muhammad	(Malaysia) PBAPP FC
	(Malaysia) Muhd Shahrul Nizam Anuar	(Malaysia) PBAPP FC
	(Malaysia) Mohd Faizol Fazree Ismail	(Malaysia) UKM F.C.
	(Malaysia) Mohd Akmal Chin	(Malaysia) Kedah U21
	(Malaysia) Mohd Shazwan Mustaffa	(Malaysia) Kedah U19
	(Malaysia) Mohd Khairudin Ramli	?
	(Malaysia) Robson Rendy Rining	?
	(Malaysia) Syahrul Faiz Shariman	?

==== Transfers Out ====
Pos.	Name	To
	(Malaysia) Abdul Rahman Abdul Ghani	(Malaysia) AirAsia F.C.
	(Malaysia) Amirul Asyraf Jamaludin	(Malaysia) AirAsia F.C.

=== PKNP F.C. ===
==== Transfers In ====
Pos.	Name	From
	(Malaysia) Muhd Afiq Amsyar Salamat	(Malaysia) DRB-Hicom F.C.
	(Malaysia) Amirul Asraf Noor	(Malaysia) Felcra F.C.
	(Malaysia) Hafizuddin Harun	(Malaysia) Felcra F.C.
	(Malaysia) Muhd Norhizwan Hassan	(Malaysia) Kuantan FA
	(Malaysia) Muhd Zahiruddin Zulkifli	(Malaysia) Melaka United
	(Malaysia) G. Mugenthiran	(Malaysia) Perak FA
	(Malaysia) Hairol Fazreen	(Malaysia) Perak FA
	(Malaysia) Hamizul Izaidi Zulkifli	(Malaysia) Perak FA
	(Malaysia) S. Vikneswaran	(Malaysia) Perak FA
	(Malaysia) Meor Nasrullah	(Malaysia) Real Mulia F.C.
	(Malaysia) Mohd Fazli Zulkifli	(Malaysia) Real Mulia F.C.
	(Malaysia) Shaik Awish	(Malaysia) Real Mulia F.C.
	(Malaysia) Muhammad Azmi	(Malaysia) PBAPP FC
	(Malaysia) Harris Roslee	(Malaysia) Perak U21
	(Malaysia) Amirul Izwan Baki	(Malaysia) Perak U21
	(Malaysia) Mohd Fareez Farhan Ismail	(Malaysia) Perak U21
	(Malaysia) Ahmad Asyraaf Omar	(Malaysia) Perak U21
	(Malaysia) Mohd Fadhil Idris	(Malaysia) Perak U21
	(Malaysia) Muhd Ibni Khozaini	(Malaysia) Perak U21
	(Malaysia) Muhd Aliff Abu Shaari	(Malaysia) Perak U21
	(Malaysia) Mazni Khairul Hasnan	(Malaysia) Perak U21
	(Malaysia) Muhd Ezanie Mat Salleh	(Malaysia) Perak U21
	(Malaysia) Muhd Hafiz Mohd Fauzi	(Malaysia) Perak U21
	(Malaysia) Shahrel Fikri Fauzi	(Malaysia) Perak U21
	(Malaysia) S. Deevan Raj	(Malaysia) Perak U21
	(Malaysia) Mohd Adzem Mansor	(Malaysia) Perak FA U19
	(Malaysia) Mohd Syamin Baharuddin	(Malaysia) Perak FA U19

==== Transfers Out ====
Entry date	Position	No	Player	From club	Fee

=== Sungai Ara F.C. ===
==== Transfers In ====
Pos.	Name	From
	(Malaysia) Syamim Alif Sobri	(Malaysia) Kedah United F.C.
	(Malaysia) Wan Hossen Wan Abdul Ghani	(Malaysia) Kedah United F.C.
	(Malaysia) Amir Omar Khata	(Malaysia) Megah Murni F.C.
	(Malaysia) Mohd Saufi Ibrahim	(Malaysia) MOF F.C.
	(Malaysia) Khairzul Azri Jamal	(Malaysia) PBAPP FC
	(Malaysia) Muhd Ikhram Ibrahim	(Malaysia) PBAPP FC
	(Malaysia) Mustafa Amini Ismail	(Malaysia) PBAPP FC
	(Malaysia) Mohd Faizal Musa	(Malaysia) Shahzan Muda F.C.
	(Malaysia) Mohd Aliff Mohd Puat	(Malaysia) Kedah FA U21
	(Malaysia) Mohd Nor Hamizaref Hamid	(Malaysia) Kedah FA U21
	(Malaysia) Aliff Afifi Arief	(Malaysia) Penang FA U21
	(Malaysia) Amirul Syazani Roslan	(Malaysia) Penang FA U21
	(Malaysia) Ku Mohd Anuar Ku Mohd Roshidi	(Malaysia) Kedah FA U19

==== Transfers Out ====
Pos.	Name	To
	(Malaysia) Muhammad Sufie Noorazizan	(Malaysia) MISC-MIFA
	(Malaysia) Mohd Ailim Fahmi Kamaruddin	(Malaysia) MOF F.C.
	(Malaysia) G. Mugenthiran	(Malaysia) Perak FA (loan return)
	(Malaysia) Muhammad Nur Amzar Nor Asli	(Malaysia) Penang FA U21
	(Malaysia) Ahmad Fitri Mohd Azmi	
	(Malaysia) Khairul Anwar Idris	
	(Malaysia) Mahathir Muhamad	
	(Malaysia) Mohd Amirul Omar	
	(Malaysia) Mohd Jailani Abdullah	
	(Malaysia) Mohd Ruzaini Jamaluddin	
	(Malaysia) Mohd Syafiq Zaquan Mohd Shapiee	
	(Malaysia) Muhamad Syamil Hakim Shukor	
	(Malaysia) Muhammad Hamizan Hussain	
	(Malaysia) Muhammad Roslizan Mohd Rodzi	
	(Malaysia) Muhammad Zulhadi Zulkefli	
	(Malaysia) Nor Faizal Mohamed Nor	
	(Malaysia) Syafiq Izzat	
	(Malaysia) Zairi Jaafar	

=== UKM F.C. ===
==== Transfers In ====
Pos.	Name	From
	(Malaysia) Badrol Hanapi Ali	(Malaysia) Megah Murni F.C.
	(Malaysia) Muhd Asyidi Dilashar Yusof	(Malaysia) PDRM FA
	(Malaysia) Saiful Hasnol Mohd Raffi	(Malaysia) Sime Darby F.C.
	(Malaysia) Mohd Farhan Aswad Badrisham	(Malaysia) Kuala Lumpur U21
	(Malaysia) Muhd Aliff Jamaluddin	(Malaysia) Perak U21
	(Malaysia) Che Mohd Safwan Hazman Che Hassan	(Malaysia) Perlis FA U21
	(Malaysia) Faiz Mohd Bandong	(Malaysia) Sime Darby F.C. U21
	(Malaysia) Gusti Ishak Fitri Shah Said	(Malaysia) Sime Darby F.C. U21
	(Malaysia) Mohd Adib Abu Bakar	(Malaysia) Sime Darby F.C. U21
	(Malaysia) Muhammad Azri Zulkiflee	(Malaysia) Sime Darby F.C. U21
	(Malaysia) Muhd Farhan Hazmi Mohd Nasir	(Malaysia) Sime Darby F.C. U21
	(Malaysia) Muhd Hadzirun Che Hamid	(Malaysia) Sime Darby F.C. U21
	(Malaysia) Muhd Rijal Fiqry Yusoff	(Malaysia) Sime Darby F.C. U21
	(Malaysia) Wan Mohammed Afiq Wan Kasbi	(Malaysia) Sime Darby F.C. U21
	(Malaysia) Muhammad Amirul Ashraf Din	?

==== Transfers Out ====
Pos.	Name	To
	(Malaysia) Mohd Faizol Fazree Ismail	(Malaysia) Penjara F.C.
	(Malaysia) Mohd Farhan Yaacob	(Malaysia) MPKB-BRI U-Bes F.C.

=== Shahzan Muda F.C. ===
==== Transfers In ====
Pos.	Name	From
	(Malaysia) Mohd Shafiq Baharudin	(Malaysia) JDT III
	(Malaysia) Muhd Jafrizan Mat Jid	(Malaysia) JDT III
	(Malaysia) Muhd Helmi Mustaqim Mokhtar	(Malaysia) Kuantan FA
	(Malaysia) Muhd Razren Mohd Jesni	(Malaysia) Kuantan FA
	(Malaysia) Muhd Afham Zulkipeli	(Malaysia) MOF F.C.
	(Malaysia) Osman Damanhuri	(Malaysia) PDRM FA U21
	(Malaysia) Mohd Asyraf Abdul Talib	(Malaysia) Johor Darul Ta'zim F.C. U21
	(Malaysia) Muhd Baqiuddin Shamsudin	(Malaysia) Pahang F.C. U21
	(Malaysia) Ahmad Nazrin Ahmad Nazim	(Malaysia) PDRM FA U21
	(Malaysia) Mohd Amir Ashraf Hussin	?
	(Malaysia) Mohd Azham Mohd Azli	?
	(Malaysia) Mohd Azwan Mohd Soadi	?
	(Malaysia) Muharam Mohamad	?

==== Transfers Out ====
Pos.	Name	To
	(Malaysia) Muhammad Zamir Zaini	(Malaysia) Felcra F.C.
	(Malaysia) Iskandar Zulkarnain Ibrahim	(Malaysia) Kuantan FA
	(Malaysia) Muhd Helmi Abdullah	(Malaysia) Pahang F.C.
	(Malaysia) Mohd Faizal Aziz	(Malaysia) Sime Darby F.C.
	(Malaysia) Mohd Faizal Musa	(Malaysia) Sungai Ara F.C.
	(Malaysia) Engku Syahrial Kahpi Engku Halin	
	(Malaysia) Mat Hafis Ariffin	
	(Malaysia) Mohd Muzzammil Omar	
	(Malaysia) Sharril Faizie Samsuddin	
	(Malaysia) Mohd Sukri Jaafar	
	(Malaysia) Muhd Nursyazwan Ahmad Mahsar	
	(Malaysia) Nor Abdah Alif Nazarudin	
	(Malaysia) Mohd Shahril Darlis	

== See also ==
- 2016 Malaysia Super League
- 2016 Malaysia Premier League
- 2016 Malaysia FAM League
- 2016 Malaysia FA Cup
- 2016 Malaysia Cup
- 2016 Malaysia President's Cup
- 2016 Malaysia Youth League
