= 2015 Negeri Sembilan Matrix season =

Negeri Sembilan Matrix
2015 season
- President: Dato' Seri Utama Haji Mohamad bin Hasan
- Head Coach: K. Devan
- Stadium: Tuanku Abdul Rahman Stadium
- Malaysia Premier League: 6th
- Malaysia FA Cup: Round of 16
- Malaysia Cup: Play-off
Home colours	Away colours	Third colours

The 2015 season was Negeri Sembilan's 92nd year in their history and 4th season in Malaysia Premier League since it was first introduced in 2004. Also it was the second season in the Malaysia Premier League following relegation on 2013 season. Along with the league, the club also participated in the Malaysia FA Cup and the Malaysia Cup.

== Events ==
On December 6, 2014, the president of the Negeri Sembilan Football Association announced that the Negeri Sembilan team will be known as Negeri Sembilan Matrix from the 2015 season. This has become the beginning of the process of privatization of the Negeri Sembilan club which will start in 2016.

On 7 February 2015, Negeri Sembilan won by defeating DRB Hicom FC at Hang Jebat Stadium in the Premier League.

On March 6, 2015, Negeri Sembilan Matrix managed by K. Devan became the new leader of the Premier League after winning their third victory beating Kuantan FA 3-1 at Darul Makmur Stadium, Kuantan. This has allowed the club to snatched that status from the previous top of the league, Johor Darul Ta'zim II.

On 26 April 2015, Negeri Sembilan Matrix managed to climb to fifth in league table after defeating Johor Darul Ta'zim II 2-1 at Tuanku Abdul Rahman Stadium, Paroi.

Pulau Pinang came back in the last minutes of the game to draw 2-2 against NS Matrix in the Premier League football match at Tuanku Abdul Rahman Stadium, Paroi on 8 May 2015.

O

On 26 August 2015, the Negeri Sembilan Football Association disbanded the Premier League team NS Matrix, shortly after the team failed to qualify for the Malaysia Cup 2015. Also eliminated is the head coach, K. Devan.

== Players ==
No.	Name	Age	Nationality	Notes
Goalkeepers
1	Helmi Eliza	31	(Malaysia)	
22	Kaharuddin Rahman	22	(Malaysia)	
30	Muhd Yatim Abdullah	21	(Malaysia)	
Defenders
2	Azizi Matt Rose	32	(Malaysia)	
3	Mohd Fauzi Nan	34	(Malaysia)	
4	Jean Marc Alexandre	27	(Haiti)	
5	Mohd Fazliata Taib	28	(Malaysia)	
6	Mohd Radzuan Abdullah	24	(Malaysia)	
21	Irwan Fadzli Idrus	33	(Malaysia)	
26	A. Segar	24	(Malaysia)	
Midfielders
7	Ahmad Fauzi Saari	32	(Malaysia)	
8	Shahrizal Saad	27	(Malaysia)	
12	G. Puaneswaran	31	(United States)	
14	K. Kavichelvan	24	(Malaysia)	
17	Mohd Akmal Mohd Noor	24	(Malaysia)	
20	Dzaiddin Zainuddin	23	(Malaysia)	
23	Rezal Zambery Yahya	37	(Malaysia)	
25	Ahmad Hazeri Hamid	20	(Malaysia)	
27	Izzuddin Zainuddin	20	(Malaysia)	
Forwards
9	Francis Forkey Doe	28	(Liberia)	
10	Bruno Martelotto	32	(Argentina)	
11	Rudie Ramli	32	(Malaysia)	
15	Kim Jin-yong	31	(South Korea)	
16	S. Sivanesan	23	(Malaysia)	
18	Khyril Muhymeen	27	(Malaysia)	

== Competitions ==
=== Malaysia Premier League ===
==== League table ====
Pos	Team	Pld	W	D	L	GF	GA	GD	Pts	Promotion, qualification or relegation
1	Kedah (C, P)	22	14	6	2	47	26	+21	48	Promotion to Super League
2	Penang (P)	22	13	6	3	39	18	+21	45	Promotion to Super League
3	(Terengganu) T-Team (O, P)	22	12	6	4	50	27	+23	42	Qualification to Promotion play-off
4	(Selangor) PKNS	22	11	8	3	41	22	+19	41	
5	Johor Darul Ta'zim II	22	10	4	8	37	32	+5	34	
6	(Negeri Sembilan) NS Matrix	22	8	8	6	33	28	+5	32	
7	Sabah	22	8	3	11	37	42	−5	27	
8	(Malaysia) UiTM	22	7	4	11	28	42	−14	25	
9	(Pahang) Kuantan	22	6	3	13	30	46	−16	21	
10	(Malaysia) DRB-Hicom	22	4	8	10	25	32	−7	20	
11	Kuala Lumpur	22	5	3	14	17	33	−16	18	
12	(Kuala Lumpur) Putrajaya SPA (R)	22	2	5	15	15	50	−35	11	Relegation to FAM League

Source: FAM Official Site, Astro Arena
Rules for classification: 1) Points; 2) Goal difference; 3) Number of goals scored
(C) Champions; (O) Play-off winners; (P) Promoted; (R) Relegated

=== Malaysia FA Cup ===
==== Round of 32 ====
The first round commenced on 27, 28 February & 2 March 2015.

Friday 27 February	NS Matrix (Negeri Sembilan)	2–0	(Selangor) UiTM	Paroi, Negeri Sembilan
20:45 UTC+08:00	Doe 21', 81'			Stadium: Tuanku Abdul Rahman Stadium; Attendance: 3,504; Referee: Azman Jamaluddin

==== Round of 16 ====
The second round commenced on 17, 18 & 21 March 2015.

17 March 2015	NS Matrix (Negeri Sembilan)	1–2	Penang	Paroi, Negeri Sembilan
20:45 UTC+08:00	Shahrizal Saad 3'		Beto Gonçalves 13'; Lee Kil-hoon 80'	Stadium: Tuanku Abdul Rahman Stadium; Attendance: 5,066; Referee: Wan Mohd Tarmizi Wan Ibrahim

=== Malaysia Cup ===
==== Format ====
In the competition, the top 10 teams from 2015 Malaysia Super League were joined by the top 4 teams from 2015 Malaysia Premier League. The remaining two teams from 2015 Malaysia Super League and the team who finished 5th and 6th place in the 2015 Malaysia Premier League competed in the playoffs for the remaining 2 spots. The teams were drawn into four groups of four teams.

==== Play-off ====
25 August 2015
20:45

ATM	3–0	Negeri Sembilan
Abdulafees 12', 52'; Shukur 38'	Report

Majlis Perbandaran Selayang Stadium, Selayang

== Statistics ==
No.	Name	Age	Natl	Total		League		FA Cup		Malaysia Cup	
No.	Name	Age	Natl	Apps	Goals	Apps	Goals	Apps	Goals	Apps	Goals
1	Helmi Eliza	31	(Malaysia)								
22	Kaharuddin Rahman	22	(Malaysia)								
30	Muhd Yatim Abdullah	21	(Malaysia)								
2	Azizi Matt Rose	32	(Malaysia)								
3	Mohd Fauzi Nan	34	(Malaysia)								
4	Jean Marc Alexandre	27	(Haiti)								
5	Mohd Fazliata Taib	28	(Malaysia)								
6	Mohd Radzuan Abdullah	24	(Malaysia)								
21	Irwan Fadzli Idrus	33	(Malaysia)								
26	A. Segar	24	(Malaysia)								
7	Ahmad Fauzi Saari	32	(Malaysia)								
8	Shahrizal Saad	27	(Malaysia)								
12	G. Puaneswaran	31	(United States)								
14	K. Kavichelvan	24	(Malaysia)								
17	Mohd Akmal Mohd Noor	24	(Malaysia)								
20	Dzaiddin Zainuddin	23	(Malaysia)								
23	Rezal Zambery Yahya	37	(Malaysia)								
25	Ahmad Hazeri Hamid	20	(Malaysia)								
27	Izzuddin Zainuddin	20	(Malaysia)								
9	Francis Forkey Doe	28	(Liberia)								
10	Bruno Martelotto	32	(Argentina)								
11	Rudie Ramli	32	(Malaysia)								
15	Kim Jin-yong	31	(South Korea)								
16	S. Sivanesan	23	(Malaysia)								
18	Khyril Muhymeen	27	(Malaysia)								
