= 2016 Negeri Sembilan FA season =

Negeri Sembilan
2016 season
- President: Dato' Seri Utama Haji Mohamad bin Hasan
- Head Coach: Gary Michael Phillips
- Stadium: Tuanku Abdul Rahman Stadium
- Malaysia Premier League: 4th
- Malaysia FA Cup: 3rd round
- Malaysia Cup: Quarter finals
- Top goalscorer: League: Andrew Nabbout (8 goals); All: Andrew Nabbout (9 goals)
Home colours	Away colours	Third colours

The 2016 season was Negeri Sembilan's 93rd year in their history and 5th season in Malaysia Premier League since it was first introduced in 2004. Also, it was the third season in the Malaysia Premier League following relegation on 2013 season. Along with the league, the club also participated in the Malaysia FA Cup and the Malaysia Cup.

== Events ==
Negeri Sembilan has changed the name of the team from Negeri Sembilan Matrix to Negeri Sembilan FA for the 2016 season. This decision was made in 2015 when the president of Negeri Sembilan was not satisfied with the performance of the team throughout the 2015 season until it failed to qualify for the Malaysia Cup and considered the NS Matrix project a failure. The team was restructured with the inclusion of young players and the dismissal of head coach K. Devan.

On 24 November 2015, Gary Phillips was appointed as the new head coach for the Negeri Sembilan team. This head coach is an experienced coach in the Malaysian football league and was the head coach for the Sabah team from 2009 to 2011. He was appointed to replace K. Devan, who had previously coached the team for the 2015 season.

On 20 May 2016, in the 12th match of the Premier League, Negeri Sembilan defeated the UiTM team by a score of 4-2, which made the Negeri Sembilan team top of the league, but were overtaken by the Melaka United team the next day when they defeated ATM, 4-2. From the 6th week to the 12th week showing, the teams of Negeri Sembilan, Kuala Lumpur and Melaka United competed to be in the top of the league.

On 17 September 2016, Negeri Sembilan was eliminated from the Malaysia Cup when they lost 0–5 to the Kedah FA at the Darul Aman Stadium. In the first leg, Negeri Sembilan only drew at home after each failed to score a goal in a 0–0 result. The advantage of 1 point in the opponent's place was used well by Kedah when they managed to bury Negeri Sembilan in the second leg without any pressure. Negeri Sembilan has stopped the 2016 Malaysia Cup campaign by only making it to the quarter-finals.

== Players ==
No.	Name	Age	Nationality	Notes
Goalkeepers
1	Afif Aizad Azman	26	(Malaysia)	
12	Kaharuddin Rahman	25	(Malaysia)	
30	Syed Adney	29	(Malaysia)	
Defenders
3	Daniel Ting	23	(Malaysia)	
4	Taylor Regan	27	(Australia)	
5	Annas Rahmat	21	(Malaysia)	
13	Ashmawi Yakin	22	(Malaysia)	
15	A. Segar	23	(Malaysia)	
20	Hariri Safii	27	(Malaysia)	
24	Shazlan Alias	26	(Malaysia)	
26	Mohd Nasriq Baharom	29	(Malaysia)	
Midfielders
2	Aroon Kumar	22	(Malaysia)	
6	Kevin Gunter	23	(Switzerland)	
7	Andrew Nabbout	22	(Australia)	
8	Shahrul Igwan	22	(United States)	
10	Alex Smith	31	(England)	
16	Norhafizzuan Jailani	27	(Malaysia)	
19	Khairul Anwar Shahrudin	25	(Malaysia)	
21	Sabri Sahar	23	(Malaysia)	
23	Muhd Nizam Ruslan	22	(Malaysia)	
25	Mohd Radzuan Abdullah	24	(Malaysia)	
27	Izzuddin Zainuddin	22	(Malaysia)	
33	N. Thanabalan	21	(Malaysia)	
Forwards
9	Mohd Afiq Azmi	27	(Malaysia)	
11	Joel Chianese	26	(Australia)	
17	Mohd Rahizi Mohd Rasib	21	(Malaysia)	

== Transfers ==
=== Transfers In ===
Pos.	Name	From	Ref
MF	(England) Alex Smith	(Australia) Far North Queensland FC	
MF	(Australia) Andrew Nabbout	(Australia) Melbourne Victory FC	
MF	(Australia) Taylor Regan	(Australia) Newcastle Jets FC	
MF	(Australia) Joel Chianese	(Malaysia) Sabah FA	
GK	(Malaysia) Syed Adney	(Malaysia) ATM FA	
DF	(Malaysia) Mohd Nasriq Baharom	(Malaysia) Felda United F.C.	
DF	(Malaysia) Annas Rahmat	(Malaysia) Harimau Muda	
DF	(Malaysia) Mohd Ashmawi Yakin	(Malaysia) Harimau Muda	
MF	(Malaysia) Shahrul Igwan Samsudin	(Malaysia) Harimau Muda	
GK	(Malaysia) Afiff Aizad Azman	(Malaysia) Johor Darul Ta'zim II F.C.	
DF	(Malaysia) Daniel Ting	(Malaysia) Johor Darul Ta'zim II F.C. (Loan)	
DF	(Malaysia) Kevin Gunter	(Malaysia) Johor Darul Ta'zim II F.C. (Loan)	
MF	(Malaysia) Mohd Norhafizzuan Jailani	(Malaysia) Putrajaya SPA F.C.	
MF	(Malaysia) Sabri Sahar	(Malaysia) Sarawak FA	
FW	(Malaysia) Mohd Afiq Azmi	(Malaysia) Selangor FA	
DF	(Malaysia) Mohd Shazlan Alias	(Malaysia) Selangor FA	
MF	(Malaysia) Khairul Anwar Shahrudin	(Malaysia) Sime Darby F.C.	
MF	(Malaysia) R. Aroon Kumar	(Malaysia) Negeri Sembilan FA U21	
FW	(Malaysia) Mohd Rahizi Mohd Rasib	(Malaysia) Negeri Sembilan FA U21	
MF	(Malaysia) Muhammad Nizam Ruslan	(Malaysia) Negeri Sembilan FA U21	
DF	(Malaysia) Hariri Mohd Safii	FREE AGENT	

=== Transfers Out ===
Pos.	Name	To	Ref
MF	(South Korea) Kim Jin-yong	(Malaysia) DRB-Hicom F.C.	
FW	(Liberia) Francis Doe	(Malaysia) Felda United F.C.	
MF	(Haiti) Jean Alexandre	(United States) Fort Lauderdale Strikers	
FW	(Malaysia) Khyril Muhymeen Zambri	(Malaysia) AirAsia Football Club	
DF	(Malaysia) Azizi Matt Rose	(Malaysia) Felcra F.C.	
MF	(Malaysia) Mohd Fazliata Taib	(Malaysia) Felcra F.C.	
FW	(Malaysia) Shahrizal Saad	(Malaysia) Felcra F.C.	
FW	(Malaysia) S. Sivanesan	(Malaysia) Felda United F.C.	
DF	(Malaysia) G. Puaneswaran	(Malaysia) Melaka United	
MF	(Malaysia) V. Kavi Chelvan	(Malaysia) Melaka United	
DF	(Malaysia) Mohd Dzaiddin Zainuddin	(Malaysia) MOF F.C.	
FW	(Malaysia) Rudie Ramli	(Malaysia) MOF F.C.	
MF	(Malaysia) Ahmad Fauzi Saari	(Malaysia) Perlis FA	
MF	(Malaysia) Mohd Akmal Mohd Nor	(Malaysia) Sarawak FA	
MF	(Argentina) Bruno Martelotto		
FW	(Malaysia) Ahmad Hazeri Hamid		
GK	(Malaysia) Helmi Eliza Elias		
DF	(Malaysia) Irwan Fadzli Idrus		
GK	(Malaysia) Mohd Yatim Abdullah		
MF	(Malaysia) Rezal Zambery Yahya		
DF	(Malaysia) Mohd Fauzi Nan	RETIRED	

== Competitions ==
=== Malaysia Premier League ===
==== League table ====
Pos	Team	Pld	W	D	L	GF	GA	GD	Pts	Promotion or relegation
1	Melaka United (C, P)	22	15	5	2	48	25	+23	50	Promotion to Super League
2	PKNS (P)	22	15	3	4	49	25	+24	48	Promotion to Super League
3	Johor Darul Ta'zim II	22	13	4	5	44	26	+18	43	
4	Negeri Sembilan	22	9	8	5	40	26	+14	35	
5	Kuala Lumpur	22	9	8	5	38	32	+6	35	
6	Perlis	22	10	4	8	38	32	+6	34	
7	DRB-HICOM	22	8	5	9	30	29	+1	29	
8	Kuantan	22	7	7	8	39	43	−4	28	
9	Sabah	22	5	5	12	26	41	−15	20	
10	UiTM	22	4	4	14	24	44	−20	16	
11	ATM	22	4	3	15	24	62	−38	15	
12	Sime Darby (R)	22	2	6	14	26	41	−15	12	Relegation to FAM League

Source: FAM Official Site, Football Malaysia LLP
Rules for classification: 1) Points; 2) Goal difference; 3) Number of goals scored; 4) Number of goals against
(C) Champions; (P) Promoted; (R) Relegated

==== Positions by round ====
Leader and promotion to 2017 Liga Super
Promotion to 2017 Liga Super
Relegation to 2017 Liga FAM

Team \ Round	1	2	3	4	5	6	7	8	9	10	11	12	13	14	15	16	17	18	19	20	21	22
Negeri Sembilan	8	5	7	7	2	2	2	3	2	3	3	2	4	5	5	5	5	5	5	5	5	4

=== Malaysia FA Cup ===
==== Second round ====
20 February 2016	Sungai Ara (3) (Penang)	0–2	Negeri Sembilan (2)	Gelugor
16:15 (UTC+8)			Chianese 65'; Ting 69'	Stadium: USM Mini Stadium

==== Third round ====
4 March 2016	Johor Darul Ta'zim (1)	4–1	Negeri Sembilan (2)	Johor Bahru
21:00 (UTC+8)	Azniee 5'; Amri 10' (pen.); Díaz 63', 90+1'		Nabbout 66'	Stadium: Tan Sri Dato Haji Hassan Yunos Stadium

=== Malaysia Cup ===
==== Format ====
In the competition, the top 11 teams from the First Round of 2016 Malaysia Super League were joined by the top 5 teams from the First Round of 2016 Malaysia Premier League. The teams were drawn into four groups of four teams.

==== Seeding ====
Pot 1	Pot 2	Pot 3	Pot 4
(Kuala Lumpur) Felda United; Johor Darul Ta'zim; Selangor (Terengganu) T–Team	Kedah; Kelantan (Malaysia) PDRM; Terengganu	Perak; Sarawak; Pahang; Malacca United	Kuala Lumpur; Negeri Sembilan; Johor Darul Ta'zim II (Selangor) PKNS

==== Group D ====
Pos	Team	Pld	W	D	L	GF	GA	GD	Pts	Qualification
1	(Kuala Lumpur) FELDA United	6	4	0	2	9	5	+4	12	Advance to Quarter-finals
2	Negeri Sembilan	6	4	0	2	9	8	+1	12	Advance to Quarter-finals
3	Malacca United	6	3	0	3	9	7	+2	9	
4	Terengganu	6	1	0	5	3	10	−7	3	

Updated to match(es) played on 19 August 2016. Source: FAM FMLLP
12 July 2016
21:00 UTC+8

FELDA United (Kuala Lumpur)	3–1	Negeri Sembilan
Jayaseelan 27'; Forkey Doe 54', 70'	Report	Annas 64'

Tun Abdul Razak Stadium, Jengka
Attendance: 1,638
Referee: S. Sittharanjanan
19 July 2016
21:00 UTC+8

Negeri Sembilan	3–2	Malacca United
Smith 27', 38'; Henrique 40'	Report	Pinto 14'; Ferris 60'

Tuanku Abdul Rahman Stadium, Seremban
Attendance: 6,177
Referee: Syed Azhar Syed Kamar
30 July 2016
21:00 UTC+8

Terengganu	1–2	Negeri Sembilan
Milić 23'	Report	Jerković 71' (pen.); Afiq 78'

Sultan Mizan Zainal Abidin Stadium, Kuala Nerus
Attendance: 2,200
Referee: Zulkifli Ahmad
30 July 2016
21:00 UTC+8

Terengganu	1–2	Negeri Sembilan
Milić 23'	Report	Jerković 71' (pen.); Afiq 78'

Sultan Mizan Zainal Abidin Stadium, Kuala Nerus
Attendance: 2,200
Referee: Zulkifli Ahmad
12 August 2016
21:00 UTC+8

Malacca United	2–0	Negeri Sembilan
Spasojević 9', 32'	Report

Hang Jebat Stadium, Malacca City
Attendance: 9,010
Referee: Saiful Mohd Yusoff Mahadi
19 August 2016
21:00 UTC+8

Negeri Sembilan	2–0	(Kuala Lumpur) FELDA United
Jerković 55'; Nizam 59'	Report

Tuanku Abdul Rahman Stadium, Seremban
Attendance: 2,006
Referee: Muhd Nazmi Nasaruddin

==== Quarter-finals ====
The first legs were played on 28 August 2016, and the second legs were played on 17 September 2016.

Team 1	Agg.	Team 2	1st leg	2nd leg
Negeri Sembilan	0–5	Kedah	0–0	0–5

First Leg

28 August 2016
21:00 UTC+8

Negeri Sembilan	0–0	Kedah
	Report

Tuanku Abdul Rahman Stadium, Paroi, Seremban
Attendance: 7,346
Referee: Saiful Mohd Rodzali

Second Leg

17 September 2016
21:00 UTC+8

Kedah	5–0	Negeri Sembilan
Smeltz 24', 33'; Thiago 39', 50'; Krasniqi 87'	Report

Darulaman Stadium, Alor Setar
Attendance: 25,000
Referee: Mohd Zamzaidi Katimin

== Statistics ==
=== Appearances and goals ===
As of 10 June 2025

No.	Pos	Nat	Player	Total		League		Malaysia Cup		Malaysia FA Cup	
No.	Pos	Nat	Player	Apps	Goals	Apps	Goals	Apps	Goals	Apps	Goals
1	GK	(Malaysia) MAS	Afif Aizad Azman	0	0	0	0	0	0	0	0
2	MF	(Malaysia) MAS	Aroon Kumar	0	0	0	0	0	0	0	0
3	DF	(Malaysia) MAS	Daniel Ting	13	0	13	0	0	0	0	0
4	DF	(Australia) AUS	Taylor Regan	28	4	28	4	0	0	0	0
5	DF	(Malaysia) MAS	Annas Rahmat	4	0	4	0	0	0	0	0
6	MF	(Switzerland) SUI	Kevin Gunter	0	0	0	0	0	0	0	0
7	MF	(Australia) AUS	Andrew Nabbout	14	9	12	8	0	0	2	1
8	MF	(Malaysia) MAS	Shahrul Igwan	1	1	1	1	0	0	0	0
9	FW	(Malaysia) MAS	Mohd Afiq Azmi	18	4	18	4	0	0	0	0
10	MF	(England) ENG	Alex Smith	25	6	25	6	0	0	0	0
11	FW	(Australia) AUS	Joel Chianese	15	7	15	7	0	0	0	0
12	GK	(Malaysia) MAS	Kaharuddin Rahman	0	0	0	0	0	0	0	0
13	DF	(Malaysia) MAS	Ashmawi Yakin	0	0	0	0	0	0	0	0
15	DF	(Malaysia) MAS	A. Segar	0	0	0	0	0	0	0	0
16	MF	(Malaysia) MAS	Norhafizzuan Jailani	2	2	2	2	0	0	0	0
17	FW	(Malaysia) MAS	Mohd Rahizi Mohd Rasib	3	0	3	0	0	0	0	0
19	MF	(Malaysia) MAS	Khairul Anwar Shahrudin	5	0	5	0	0	0	0	0
21	MF	(Malaysia) MAS	Sabri Sahar	0	0	0	0	0	0	0	0
23	MF	(Malaysia) MAS	Muhd Nizam Ruslan	0	0	0	0	0	0	0	0
24	DF	(Malaysia) MAS	Shazlan Alias	0	0	0	0	0	0	0	0
25	MF	(Malaysia) MAS	Mohd Radzuan Abdullah	0	0	0	0	0	0	0	0
26	DF	(Malaysia) MAS	Mohd Nasriq Baharom	0	0	0	0	0	0	0	0
27	MF	(Malaysia) MAS	Izzuddin Zainuddin	0	0	0	0	0	0	0	0
30	GK	(Malaysia) MAS	Syed Adney	26	0	26	0	0	0	0	0
33	MF	(Malaysia) MAS	N. Thanabalan	0	0	0	0	0	0	0	0
