= 2010 Perak FA season =

Perak
2010 season
- President: Mohammad Nizar Jamaluddin
- Manager: Norazli Musa
- Head Coach: Raja Azlan Shah Raja So'ib
- Stadium: Perak Stadium
- Super League: 11th
- FA Cup: Second round
- Malaysia Cup: Group stage
- Top goalscorer: Nazri Kamal (6)
Home colours

The 2010 season was Perak's seventh consecutive season in the Malaysian Super League.

== Players ==
=== First-team squad ===
As of 4 December 2009

Note: Flags indicate national team as defined under FIFA eligibility rules; some limited exceptions apply. Players may hold more than one non-FIFA nationality.

No.	Pos.	Nation	Player
1	GK	(Malaysia) MAS	Khairul Amri
3	DF	(Malaysia) MAS	Arif Fazlie
4	DF	(Malaysia) MAS	Sathiakumaran Subramaniam
5	DF	(Malaysia) MAS	Arif Ismail
6	DF	(Malaysia) MAS	Syazwan Roslan
7	MF	(Malaysia) MAS	Benedict Martin
8	DF	(Malaysia) MAS	Hafiszuan Salehuddin
9	FW	(Malaysia) MAS	Saufi Saadi
10	MF	(Malaysia) MAS	Nazri Kamal
11	FW	(Malaysia) MAS	Shahrizal Saad
12	MF	(Malaysia) MAS	Farid Hamidan
13	DF	(Malaysia) MAS	Wan Azwari
14	MF	(Malaysia) MAS	Hafiz Abdul Rahman

No.	Pos.	Nation	Player
15	DF	(Malaysia) MAS	Azmeer Yusof
16	MF	(Malaysia) MAS	Khalis Ibrahim
17	MF	(Malaysia) MAS	K. Nanthakumar (captain)
18	FW	(Malaysia) MAS	Fauzzi Kassim
19	DF	(Malaysia) MAS	Shafuan Adli
20	MF	(Malaysia) MAS	Isma Alif
21	GK	(Malaysia) MAS	Khairul Izwan Jamaluddin
22	GK	(Malaysia) MAS	Megat Amir Faisal
23	FW	(Malaysia) MAS	Razali Umar Kandasamy
—	GK	(Malaysia) MAS	Kamarul Effandi
—	GK	(Malaysia) MAS	Khairul Izwan Mohamed
—	DF	(Malaysia) MAS	Fauzi Ariffin

== Coaching staff ==
Position	Staff
Manager	(Malaysia) Norazli Musa
Head coach	(Malaysia) Raja Azlan Shah Raja So'ib
Assistant coach	(Malaysia) Abu Bakar Fadzim
Goalkeeper coach	(Malaysia) Megat Amir Faisal

== Competitions ==
=== Super League ===
==== League table ====
Pos	Team	Pld	W	D	L	GF	GA	GD	Pts	Qualification or relegation
9	Kuala Lumpur	26	8	8	10	20	29	−9	32	
10	PLUS	26	8	6	12	29	29	0	30	Withdrawal from Liga Super (Note: PLUS withdrew from Liga Super before the start of 2011 season.)
11	Perak	26	8	6	12	25	30	−5	30	
12	Perlis	26	8	5	13	32	35	−3	29	
13	Johor	26	5	1	20	18	66	−48	16	Relegation to 2011 Liga Premier

Source: Results TM Liga Super
Rules for classification: 1) points; 2) goal difference; 3) number of goals scored.

=== Malaysia FA Cup ===
Win Draw Loss

The competition involved 30 teams — 16 Super League and 14 Premier League sides.

First round

2 February 2010 First Leg	Perlis	0–0	Perak	Kangar, Perlis
20:45				Stadium: Tuanku Syed Putra Stadium

6 February 2010 Second Leg	Perak	2–1 (2–1 agg.)	Perlis	Ipoh, Perak
20:45	Saufi Saadi 7', 26'		Hazrul 74'	Stadium: Perak Stadium

Second round

16 February 2010 First Leg	T-Team	1–1	Perak	Kuala Terengganu, Terengganu
20:45	Haris 80'		Azmeer 75'	Stadium: Sultan Ismail Nasiruddin Shah Stadium

20 February 2010 Second Leg	Perak	0–2 (1–3 agg.)	T-Team	Ipoh, Perak
20:45			Ismail 7'; Azrul Hazran 72'	Stadium: Perak Stadium

=== Malaysia Cup ===
The competition began on 14 September 2010 and concluded on 30 October 2010 with the final, held at National Stadium, Bukit Jalil. A total of 16 teams took part in the competition. The teams were divided into 4 groups of 4 teams.

==== Group stage ====
Pos	Team	Pld	W	D	L	GF	GA	GD	Pts
1	Johor FC (A)	6	3	3	0	7	3	+4	12
2	Kedah FA (A)	6	2	3	1	8	3	+5	9
3	Perak FA	6	2	1	3	4	7	−3	7
4	(Federal Territories of Malaysia) ATM FA	6	0	3	3	5	11	−6	3

(A) Advanced to knockout stage

Win Draw Loss

The group leaders and runners-up teams in the groups after 6 matches qualified to the quarterfinals.

14 September 2010 1	Perak	2–2	ATM	Ipoh, Perak
20:45				Stadium: Perak Stadium

17 September 2010 2	Kedah	2–0	Perak	Alor Setar, Kedah
20:45				Stadium: Darul Aman Stadium

20 September 2010 3	Johor FC	2–0	Perak	Pasir Gudang, Johor
20:45				Stadium: Pasir Gudang Corporation Stadium

3 October 2010 4	ATM	0–1	Perak	Selayang, Selangor
20:45				Stadium: MPS Stadium

6 October 2010 5	Perak	1–0	Kedah	Ipoh, Perak
20:45				Stadium: Perak Stadium

9 October 2010 6	Perak	0–1	Johor FC	Ipoh, Perak
20:45				Stadium: Perak Stadium
