= Mohd Zaiza Zainal Abidin =

Malaysian footballer

Mohd Zaiza
Personal information
- Full name: Mohd Zaiza bin Zainal Abidin
- Date of birth: 1 February 1986 (age 40)
- Place of birth: Selangor, Malaysia
- Height: 1.75 m (5 ft 9 in)
- Position: Defender

Youth career
- 2004–2005: Selangor FA

Senior career*
Years	Team	Apps	(Gls)
2006–2010	Selangor FA		
2011–2015	Pahang FA		
2016	PKNS F.C.		
- * Club domestic league appearances and goals as of January 24, 2017 ‡ National team caps and goals as of January 24, 2017

Mohd Zaiza Zainal Abidin (born 1 February 1986) is a Malaysian football defender who is currently playing defender for Selangor United.

He is a son of former footballer Zainal Abidin Hassan.

== Honours ==
=== Club ===
- Malaysia Cup: 1
  - Winners (1): 2013
