= Rosdin Wasli =

Malaysian footballer

Personal information
- Full name: Rosdin bin Wasli
- Date of birth: 26 June 1982 (age 44)
- Place of birth: Petagas, Kota Kinabalu, Sabah, Malaysia
- Height: 1.78 m (5 ft 10 in)
- Position: Defender

Team information
- Current team: Sabah FA
- Number: 15

Senior career*
Years	Team	Apps	(Gls)
2002 –	Sabah FA	92	(12)
- * Club domestic league appearances and goals as of 27 March 2014 ‡ National team caps and goals as of 27 March 2014

Rosdin Wasli (born 26 June 1982) is a Malaysian footballer who plays as a defender and midfielder for Sabah FA in Malaysia Premier League. He was born in Petagas, Kota Kinabalu, Sabah.
