= Mohd Hazwan Zainun =

Malaysian footballer

Hazwan Zainun
Personal information
- Full name: Mohd Hazwan bin Zainun
- Date of birth: 31 December 1987 (age 38)
- Place of birth: Kedah, Malaysia
- Position: Midfielder

Team information
- Current team: MISC-MIFA
- Number: 14

Youth career
- 2006: Kedah FA President Cup

Senior career*
| Years | Team | Apps | (Gls) |
| 2007–2008 | Kedah FA | 2 | (0) |
| 2009–2012 | Perlis FA | 22 | (2) |
| 2013 | PB Melayu Kedah | 16 | (5) |
| April 2014–2015 | Perlis FA | 18 | (3) |
| 2016− | MISC-MIFA | 21 | (4) |
- * Club domestic league appearances and goals as of January 24, 2017

Mohd Hazwan Zainun (born 31 December 1987, in Kedah) is a Malaysian footballer currently playing as a midfielder for MISC-MIFA.

Known as "Pak Leh" by fans, Hazwan is a product's of Kedah President Cup squad and was promoted to senior team for season 2007–08.
