= Benedict Martin =

Malaysian footballer

Personal information
- Full name: Benedict Martin
- Date of birth: 17 July 1987 (age 39)
- Place of birth: Sarawak, Malaysia
- Height: 1.71 m (5 ft 7 1/2 in)
- Positions: Midfielder; defender

Team information
- Current team: Sarawak FA
- Number: 8

Youth career
- 2005–2006: Sarawak U19 (Piala Belia)
- 2007–2008: Selangor U21 (Piala Presiden)

Senior career*
Years	Team	Apps	(Gls)
2008–2010	Perak FA	13	(4)
2011–2012	Sarawak FA	11	(1)
2013–2015	Kuala Lumpur FA	32	(13)
2017–2020	Sarawak FA	35	(11)

Managerial career
- 2021–2023: Sarawak FA (Assistant Coach)
- 2024–2025: Kuching City (U20 Assistant coach)
- * Club domestic league appearances and goals as of 26 June 2018

Benedict Martin (born 17 July 1987) is a Malaysian footballer who plays as a midfielder for his hometown club Sarawak FA after venturing out playing in peninsular Malaysia.

== Career ==
Benedict started his professional career in 2005, enrolling with Sarawak youth squad. He then transferred to Selangor youth squad, due to him furthering his studies in Universiti Teknologi MARA in Shah Alam.

For the 2009 season, Benedict signed to play for Perak. Here, he made his name as a dead-ball specialist for Perak. He played for two seasons with Perak.

He returns to his home state, Sarawak to play for the Sarawak F.A. team in the 2011 Malaysia Premier League season.

After 2 years with Sarawak, Benedict joined Kuala Lumpur in 2013. He also served as team captain during the 2013 season.
