= Bruno Martelotto =

Argentine footballer

Personal information
- Full name: Bruno Sebastián Martelotto
- Date of birth: 3 November 1982 (age 43)
- Place of birth: San Francisco, Argentina
- Height: 1.74 m (5 ft 9 in)
- Position: Midfielder

Team information
- Current team: Instituto (reserves manager)

Senior career*
Years	Team	Apps	(Gls)
2003	Penang FA	0	(0)
2003–2005	MPPJ FC	44	(13)
2005–2006	Sportivo Belgrano	27	(0)
2006–2007	Hatria Calcio		
2007	Deportes Antofagasta	18	(2)
2008	Ñublense	33	(1)
2009	Kavala	6	(1)
2009–2010	Panetolikos	10	(0)
2010	San Martín SJ	2	(0)
2011–2012	Santiago Morning	27	(2)
2012–2014	ATM FA		
2015	Negeri Sembilan FA		
2016	Antártida Argentina		

Managerial career
- 2020–2022: Sportivo Belgrano
- 2022: Alumni de Villa María
- 2022–2023: Godoy Cruz (assistant)
- 2024–: Instituto (reserves)
- 2024: Instituto (interim)
- 2025: Instituto (interim)
- 2026: Instituto (interim)
- * Club domestic league appearances and goals

Bruno Sebastián Martelotto (born 11 March 1982) is an Argentine football manager and former player who played as a midfielder. He is the current manager of Instituto's reserve team.

== Career ==
Born in San Francisco, Córdoba, Martelotto played for MPPJ FC in Malaysian Super League in Malaysia, for Deportes Antofagasta and Ñublense in Primera División in Chile and for Kavala and Panetolikos in the Beta Ethniki in Greece.

After playing for Chilean club Santiago Morning in 2011, he returned to Malaysia and joined the Malaysia Premier League club, ATM FA alongside Marlon Alex James.

== Honours ==
MPPJ Selangor

- Malaysia Cup: 2003
- Malaysia Premier League: 2004
- Malaysian Charity Shield: 2004

ATM FA

- Malaysia Premier League: 2012
- Malaysian Charity Shield: 2013
