= Azizi Matt Rose =

Malaysian footballer

Personal information
- Full name: Azizi bin Matt Rose
- Date of birth: 6 November 1981 (age 45)
- Place of birth: Kangar, Perlis, Malaysia
- Height: 1.77 m (5 ft 9 1/2 in)
- Position: Defender

Team information
- Current team: Guar Syed Alwi F.C.
- Number: 18

Youth career
- 2007–2008: Perlis President's Cup Team

Senior career*
Years	Team	Apps	(Gls)
2002–2006	Perlis FA	12	(0)
2006–2007	PDRM FA	14	(0)
2007–2008	Perlis FA	24	(0)
2008–2009	Kuala Muda Naza FC	31	(4)
2010–2011	Kelantan FA	18	(2)
2011–2012	T-Team	24	(3)
2012–2013	Kelantan FA	26	(0)
2014–2015	Johor Darul Takzim FC		
2015–2016	Negeri Sembilan FA		
2016–2017	Felcra F.C.		
2019–2020	Perlis United F.C.		
2023–	Guar Syed Alwi F.C.		

International career
2006	Malaysia	2	(0)
- * Club domestic league appearances and goals

Azizi bin Matt Rose (born 6 November 1981) is a Malaysian professional footballer who plays as a defender.

== Club career ==
=== Perlis FA ===
Azizi Matt Rose began his career in football by playing for Perlis President Cup team, after he managed to be inhaled by the management team. He successfully promoted into the Perlis senior squad. At that time Perlis was Malaysia football respected team in 2002–2006. He was selected to play Asian Cup 2007.

=== PDRM FA ===
He joined the PDRM in the 2007 season. With that team, he successfully led the team to win the Malaysia Premier League, and play in the Malaysia Super League for the next year. However, not long after that, he left the team the following year.

=== Kuala Muda Naza ===
He rejoined Perlis in 2008. However, he went out and joined a new team from Kedah, KM Naza. With his new team, he successfully led the team to win the Malaysia Premier League and led the team reached the FA Cup semi-final.

=== T-Team FC ===
He together with Indra Putra and Nor Farhan Muhammad leaving Kelantan at the end of 2010 after Kelantan won their first Malaysia Cup. The trio joined the club from Terengganu, T-Team. Together with T-Team, he is the key player of the team to the semi-finals of the Malaysia Cup and create clean record against Selangor during the 2011 season.

=== Kelantan FA ===
He played superbly while playing for Kelantan. He has always been a key player in the team every game. Kelantan won the Malaysia Cup for the first time in 2010 and he played well in that historic game. He return to Kelantan after the a season with T-Team. Last May he had undergone ACL surgery and was sidelined for six months. He has been undergoing treatment at the National Sports Council (NSC), Kuala Lumpur. Expected to be back playing at the beginning of 2013.

== Honours ==
=== Club ===
Perlis Malaysia Super League : 2005

=== Johor Darul Takzim ===
- Malaysia Super League: 2014

==== Kelantan ====
- Malaysia Super League: 2011, 2012; Runner-up 2010
- Malaysia Cup: 2010, 2012; Runner-up 2009, 2013
- Malaysia FA Cup: 2012, 2013; Runner-up 2011, 2009
- Malaysia Charity Shield: 2011; Runner-up 2012, 2013
