= Jean Alexandre (footballer) =

Haitian footballer (born 1986)

Personal information
- Full name: Jean-Marc Alexandre
- Date of birth: 24 August 1986 (age 40)
- Place of birth: Verrettes, Haiti
- Height: 5 ft 11 in (1.80 m)
- Position: Midfielder

College career
Years	Team	Apps	(Gls)
2005–2008	Lynn Fighting Knights		

Senior career*
Years	Team	Apps	(Gls)
2006–2007	Palm Beach Pumas	12	(1)
2008	Ventura County Fusion	4	(0)
2009–2011	Real Salt Lake	38	(1)
2009	→ Austin Aztex (loan)	9	(4)
2012	San Jose Earthquakes	2	(0)
2012	→ Orlando City (loan)	6	(2)
2013	Orlando City	12	(2)
2014–2015	Negeri Sembilan FA		
2016	Fort Lauderdale Strikers	11	(0)
2017–2018	South Florida Surf	9	(0)
2018–2020	Hang Yuen		

International career^{‡}
2008–2016	Haiti	42	(2)
- * Club domestic league appearances and goals as of 22 April 2022 ‡ National team caps and goals as of 22 April 2022

Jean-Marc Alexandre (born 24 August 1986) is a Haitian former international footballer who played as a midfielder.

== Career ==
=== Youth and college ===
Born in Verrettes, Haiti, Alexandre grew up Delray Beach, Florida, attended Atlantic High School, and played college soccer at Lynn University. During his collegiate years he also played in the USL Premier Development League with Palm Beach Pumas and Ventura County Fusion.

=== Professional ===
Alexandre was drafted in the first round (12th overall) in the 2009 MLS SuperDraft by Real Salt Lake. He made his professional debut on 28 March 2009, coming on as a substitute in RSL's game against Seattle Sounders FC. After a 2–0 victory over Vancouver Whitecaps FC in June 2011, Alexandre was named Player of the Week after scoring his first goal and first career assist in MLS.

Alexandre was traded by Salt Lake to San Jose Earthquakes on 1 December 2011 in exchange for a first-round pick in the 2012 MLS Supplemental Draft.

San Jose sent Alexandre to USL Pro club Orlando City on 7 June 2012 for a two-match loan deal. He was re-loaned to Orlando City again on 6 July on a second two-match loan.

He signed for Malaysian club Negeri Sembilan FA in 2014.

On 1 March 2018, he signed for Taiwanese club Hang Yuen.

=== International ===
Alexandre is a full international for Haiti, having played in three friendlies in 2008, starting against Honduras, and coming off the bench against Trinidad & Tobago twice.

== Honours ==
=== Club ===
Orlando City SC

- USL (1): 2013
