= Shahrizal Saad =

Malaysian footballer

Personal information
- Full name: Shahrizal bin Mohd Saad
- Date of birth: 5 June 1987 (age 39)
- Place of birth: Perak, Malaysia
- Height: 1.73 m (5 ft 8 in)
- Position: Forward

Youth career
- 2004–2007: Perak FA President's Cup

Senior career*
Years	Team	Apps	(Gls)
2007–2011	Perak	17	(7)
2011–2012	Johor FC	22	(5)
2012–2013	Felda United	10	(1)
2013–2014	Perak		
2015	Negeri Sembilan		
2016	Felcra		
2017	Perlis		
2018	Hanelang		

International career^{‡}
2011	Malaysia	2	(0)
- * Club domestic league appearances and goals ‡ National team caps and goals as of February 14, 2016

Shahrizal bin Mohd Saad (born 5 June 1987) is a Malaysian former professional footballer who played as a forward.

== Career ==
Shahrizal started his career at Perak FA and he also played for the Perak President Cup team at the youth level. He was one of the players in the Perak President Cup who win the competition in 2007. Scoring 12 goals, he was the second top scorer in the team behind Razali Umar Kandasamy.

He played for Johor FC in 2012 and Felda United in 2013, before rejoining Perak for the 2014 season. In 2015, he player for Negeri Sembilan FA in the Malaysia Premier League.

== National team ==
He made his debut for the Malaysia national football team, when he entered the friendly match against Hong Kong national football team as a late substitute for Safee Sali, on 9 February 2011.

== Personal life ==
Shahrizal is the older brother of Shahrul Saad. They also have another brother who is the former Perak FA and Terengganu FA player, Syamsul Saad.
