= 2019 Selangor FA season =

2019 season of Malaysian association football club

FA Selangor
2019 season
- President: Tengku Amir Shah
- Manager: Abdul Rauf Ahmad
- Head coach: B. Sathianathan
- Stadium: Shah Alam Stadium
- Super League: 3rd
- FA Cup: Third Round
- Malaysia Cup: Semi-finals
- Top goalscorer: League: (12 goals); Ifedayo Olusegun; All: (16 goals); Ifedayo Olusegun
- Highest home attendance: 65,317; Malaysia Cup; Selangor vs. Johor Darul Ta'zim (26 October 2019)
- Lowest home attendance: 1,422; Super League; Selangor vs. Kuala Lumpur (15 June 2019)
- Average home league attendance: 6,960
- Biggest win: 3–0 v Kelantan (A) (2 April 2019); FA Cup; 5–2 v Pahang (H) (25 June 2019); Super League; 3–0 v Petaling Jaya City (H) (13 July 2019); Super League
- Biggest defeat: 0–4 v PKNS (H) (17 February 2019); Super League
Home colours	Away colours	Third colours

The 2019 Selangor FA Season was Selangor FA's 14th season playing soccer in the Malaysia Super League since its inception in 2004.

The season began on 3 February 2019. The team participated in two domestic cups, the Malaysia FA Cup and the Malaysia Cup.

== Season Overview ==
=== Pre-season ===
(Squad build and first transfers)

On 1 November 2018, Azamuddin Akil announced that he would be leaving after Selangor had not renewed his contract.

On 7 November 2018, Selangor announced the transfers of Syazwan Zainon from Kedah.

On 23 November 2018, B. Sathianathan was officially announced as Selangor's new coach for the upcoming season. He appeared for his first press conference in front of the media on that day.

On 28 November, Selangor announced that six players, Joseph Kalang Tie, Norazlan Razali, Shahrul Igwan, Razman Roslan, Fairuz Abdul Aziz and Halim Zainal will be leaving the club after their contract would not be renewed for the upcoming season.

On 30 November, Selangor agreed a contract extension of eight players, Tamil Maran, Haziq Ridwan, Ashmawi Yakin, Amirul Haziq, Syukri Azman, Arunasalam Namathevan, Kannan Kalaiselvan, and Amirul Ashraf, keeping them at the club for one more years. The next day, Azizul Baharuddin, K. Sarkunan, D. Kugan and Faizzudin Abidin still remains and their contracts also been renewed too by the club. Besides that, Saiful Ridzuwan switched sides and joined Melaka United on a free transfer after his contract with the club has become expired.

After that, Khairulazhan, Sean Selvaraj, Amri Yahyah and Syahmi Safari still remains and also extended their contract until 2019.

Selangor had reached an agreement with Kedah for the transfer of Halim Saari. The transfer confirmed on 3 December 2018. The next day, Selangor signed K. Prabakaran from FELDA United.

On 5 December, Selangor announced the signing of Norhakim Isa from PKNP.

On 7 December, Selangor completed the transfer of Messi Terengganu winger Faiz Nasir from Terengganu on a free transfer. Two days later, the club confirmed an agreement with Terengganu too for the transfer of midfielder Latiff Suhaimi on a free deal.

Selangor also confirmed the signing of Azreen Zulkafali from FELDA United; he was along with new coach B. Sathianathan and K. Prabakaran, migrate to find a new challenge with the new club.

On 12 December, Selangor announced the signing of goalkeeper, Farizal Harun from FELDA United too.

Selangor continued their transfer activity on 14 December, signing midfielder Wan Zack Haikal from FELDA United too and Nurridzuan Abu Hassan from PKNS on a free transfer.

Selangor have released their four foreign players last season, Ilham Armaiyn, Evan Dimas, Willian Pacheco and Alfonso Cruz, after their contracts were not renewed by the club. On 16 December, Selangor confirmed that Rufino Segovia still remains with the team, and it was announced that Spanish striker agreed to a contract extension with the club for a further a one-year until 2019, with an option of an additional year.

On 1 January 2019, Selangor confirmed the transfer of their new foreign players, Antonio German and Endrick on a free transfer.

On 5 January, Selangor confirmed another transfer for foreign player, Michal Nguyễn from Thai club, Air Force Central on a free transfer.

On 10 January, Selangor announced the signing of Australian defender Taylor Regan from Adelaide United. It was the last signing of foreign player for the club.

A deadline transfer on 20 February 2019, Selangor make a decision to release one of foreign players, Antonio German, after his poor performance in the last three games in league matches, make the club take the action on him. Then, the club bring former Kedah foreign player, Sandro da Silva to replace him.

The club have bring a new local player, Khyril Muhymeen from Perlis. The club also bring Fandi Othman from PKNS F.C. on loan, which the club have made agreement with PKNS to swap loan deal with Kannan Kalaiselvan.

=== Pre-season and Friendlies Match ===
On 22 December 2018, Selangor began its pre-season campaign against Penang at the MMU Stadium in Cyberjaya. The match finished with a draw by 1–1.

The next fixture, Selangor visited PKNP on 29 December 2018 at Manjung Municipal Council Stadium, Manjung, Perak. Selangor lose the match by 2–0, with a goals from visitor by Aleksandar Glišić and Hasnan Mat Isa.

Four days later, Selangor faced UiTM, at MPSJ Stadium, Subang Jaya. However, the club has yet to win any victories after losing 2–1 against from premier league (second division) club.

Three days later, Selangor continued their friendly matches against Kuala Lumpur. Finally, Selangor get the first victory after won by 3–2, with a goal scored by Sean Selvaraj, Wan Zack Haikal and Amri Yahyah.

On 9 January 2019, Selangor meet UKM for the next game at INSPEN Stadium in Bangi, which UKM won by 5–2. It was the third defeat for the club in pre-season friendly after five matches.

Two days later, Selangor faced the champions of the Champions League Selangor, Puchong Fuerza at the 3K Sports Complex, Subang Jaya. The Red Giants thrashed with a big wins by 6–0. It was the team's second win in six friendly matches.

On 13 January 2019, Selangor announced that the team would be touring Thailand, and is scheduled to meet with three teams, MOF Customs United, Chonburi, and Thai Honda.

The first tour match was played on 14 January at the IPE Stadium in Chonburi, where Selangor beat MOF Customs Unites 3–0 with goals from Rufino Segovia (two goals) and Endrick dos Santos.

The next day, the team played a second match tour against the Chonburi at the same place, which they drew 1–1 with goals from Faiz Nasir (Selangor) and Lukian (Chonburi).

In the last tour match on 17 January, the Red Giants gained the second victory against the Thai League 2 club, Thai Honda by 2–1, which means the club successfully compete the tour match without defeat (two wins, one draw).

After returning to Shah Alam, Selangor played their another friendly of the summer at UM Arena Stadium against Singapore club, Home United on 22 January 2019. Two goals from Rufino Segovia and one goal from Antonio German secured a 3–1 win.

=== February ===
On 3 February 2019, Selangor kicked off the 2019 Malaysia Super League season against FELDA United at home. The match finished with a 1–1 draw, following a goals from Antonio German (Selangor) and Hadin Azman (FELDA United).

A late Rufino equalizer, got Selangor a 1–1 draw against Petaling Jaya City on 9 February 2019.

Without any victories in two matches, Selangor suffered a 0–4 loss against brothers PKNS on 17 February 2019.

The away game at Pahang, on 24 February 2019, ended in a 1–1 draw with the lone goal coming from Rufino Segovia. After four league matches, Selangor still deadlocked to find their first win in the league.

=== March ===
On 1 March 2019, Selangor suffered their second consecutive loss without a win after five matches in the league, as they were out-played by Johor Darul Ta'zim in a 2–4 home defeat.

On 11 March 2019, Selangor finally gained the first victory in the league, after beat the rival Kuala Lumpur by 3–2. They behind two goals in the first half, but they rise up in the second half, with a goals from Sandro, Syazwan Zainon and Amri Yahyah.

After international break, Selangor continued their league match on 29 March 2019 with a narrow 1–0 victory against Terengganu at home, with a lone goal from Faiz Nasir.

=== April ===
On 2 April, Selangor defeated Kelantan 3–0 away from home on second round of the FA Cup. Faiz Nasir scored a brace and the other goal came from Syazwan Zainon.

Four days later, two goals from Amri Yahyah and two late goals from Sean Selvaraj gave Selangor a 4–3 dramatically win over Melaka United at away.

A home match against Perak in the league match on 12 April ended in a 1–1 draw, which Selangor goal scored by Sandro, and the opponent goal scored by Hakim Hassan.

Four days later, Selangor were knocked out of the FA Cup, after suffered a 1–2 upset home loss to FELDA United, which Syahmi Safari scored the lone goal for Selangor.

On 20 April, PKNP were defeated 2–1 in the league match at the Shah Alam with goals from Sandro and Syahmi.

Six days later, Selangor came away with a 1–1 draw at Kedah, despite getting an early lead after a goal from Sandro.

=== May ===
On the new month, the home game against Melaka United in the league ended in a 1–1 draw, with the goal coming from Syahmi was not enough to secure a win.

On 15 May, a hatrick from new import Ifedayo Olusegun helped Selangor to take a smashing 3–1 victory over Kedah at home, and overtook visitor's position on the third place in the league.

Three days later, a lone goal from Ifedayo saved Selangor one point in a 1–1 draw against PKNP at away.

On 24 May, Selangor lost 1–0 to Terengganu away from home. The own goal in injury time from K. Sarkunan have sealed a victory for The Turtles.

=== June ===
On 15 June after the Eid al-Fitr break, a late penalty goal from Sandro gave Selangor a 2–1 home win against rival Kuala Lumpur after Ifedayo scored the other goal.

Four days later, Selangor lost to the top league current leader Johor Darul Ta'zim by 3–2, with Khyril Muhymeen and Sandro scoring the goals in an attempted late comeback.

On 25 June, Pahang was defeated 5–2, with another great performance of Ifedayo as he managed his 2nd hat-trick in the league and another goals scored by Khyril and Endrick to complete another victory for the red giants side.

=== July ===
On 7 July, Selangor defeated FELDA United away at the Tun Abdul Razak Stadium with a score of 1–2. Fabulous first half goals from Sandro and Ifedayo were enough to secure a comfortable victory in a top-against-bottom clash.

Three days later, Selangor lost 3–2 away from home to Perak in the league. Taylor Regan struck first and put Selangor in the lead but Careca equalized for the home side. Before end of the first half, Endrick would later score again, but Leandro dos Santos made a level to make the score 2–2. Careca scored another at second half to sealed victory for Seladang.

Three days later, Selangor sealed another victory in the league game after defeated Petaling Jaya City 3–0 at home. A three goals from Endrick, Khyril and Ifedayo were enough to take all three points.

On 20 July, Selangor ended the league season by defeating PKNS 3–2 away from home. Ifedayo scored a brace, and another goal scored by Sandro. Their victory also confirmed their 3rd placed in the league.

=== August ===
Selangor continue their journey to face the Malaysia Cup tournament. The match begins on 3 August in the group stage, where the red giants drew 2–2 with FELDA United at home. Syazwan Zainon and Ifedayo were the goalscorers for the home side.

On 8 August, Selangor defeated Melaka United 1–0 away from home on the second match. An own goal from the home side by Jang Suk-won was enough to give the Red Giants the first three points of the campaign.

On the third match, Selangor drew 1–1 with PDRM on 18 August at home. Sandro scored first to gave the home side lead, before Argzim Redžović scored the equalizer for visitor. Three days later, Selangor face back again the same opponent from home to away. The results end with a 2–2 draw. Taylor Regan scored first, while Ifedayo scored the second.

=== September ===
After international break, Selangor struggle to find victory after getting a 1–1 draw on 14 September against FELDA United at home. Khyril's 1st goal was not enough for the home side after the equalizing goal of Saiful Ridzuwan.

Four days later, Selangor defeated FELDA United 2–1 on the last match at the group stage. Goals from Ifedayo and Khyril that ensure the red giants reach the top spot in Malaysia Cup Group D.

At knockout stage, Selangor faced the title holders Perak in the quarter-finals. The first leg from away game, Selangor loss 1–0 with a lone goal from Brendan Gan. A week later, Selangor clinch a victory 3–1 on the return leg against the same opponent. A brace from Khyril and a goal from Syazwan Zainon gave Selangor a 3–2 advantage over the two legs, and secure the red giants a spot in the semi-finals.

=== October ===
On 19 October, Selangor loss with a 1–2 defeat away at the hands of Johor Darul Ta'zim in the first leg of the Malaysia Cup semi-finals, despite an equalizer by Ifedayo.

A week later, Selangor were eliminated from the Malaysia Cup after a 0–3 loss against the same opponent in the second leg (5–1 loss on aggregate) at home. A hatrick from Safawi Rasid gave Selangor end the journey on the tournament, thus ending the season without any trophy.

== Players ==
=== First Team Squad ===
No.	Name	Nationality	Position(s)	Since	Signed from
Goalkeepers
1	Khairulazhan Khalid	(Malaysia)	GK	2016	Pahang
23	Haziq Ridwan	(Malaysia)	GK	2017	Youth system
30	Farizal Harun	(Malaysia)	GK	2018	FELDA United
Defenders
2	A. Namathevan	(Malaysia)	RB / RWB	2016	Youth system
3	Fandi Othman	(Malaysia)	LB / LWB	2019	PKNS
4	Ashmawi Yakin	(Malaysia)	RB / RWB / CB	2017	Negeri Sembilan
5	Taylor Regan	(Australia)	CB	2019	(Australia) Adelaide United
13	Latiff Suhaimi	(Malaysia)	CB / DM / CM	2018	Terengganu
19	Kanadasan Prabakaran	(Malaysia)	CB / LB / DM	2018	FELDA United
24	Syukri Azman	(Malaysia)	LB / LWB	2017	Youth system
25	Azreen Zulkafali	(Malaysia)	RB / LB / DM	2018	FELDA United
26	Michal Nguyễn	(Vietnam) (Czech Republic)	CB	2019	(Thailand) Air Force Central
27	M. Tamil Maran	(Malaysia)	CB / DM	2017	Youth system
Midfielders
6	K. Sarkunan	(Malaysia)	DM / CM	2016	Youth system
7	Sean Selvaraj	(Malaysia)	RW / LW / RM / LM	2017	Negeri Sembilan
14	Endrick	(Brazil)	DM / CM	2019	Felcra
15	Faiz Nasir	(Malaysia)	CAM / LW / RW	2018	Terengganu
16	Nurridzuan Abu Hassan	(Malaysia)	CM / LM / LWB / LB	2018	PKNS
18	Halim Saari	(Malaysia)	DM / CM	2018	Kedah
20	Syahmi Safari	(Malaysia)	RM / LM / RB / RWB	2016	Youth system
21	Norhakim Isa	(Malaysia)	DM / CM	2018	PKNP
22	Syazwan Zainon	(Malaysia)	LW / LM / RW / RM	2018	Kedah
Forwards
8	Khyril Muhymeen	(Malaysia)	CAM / CF / ST	2019	Perlis
9	Sandro	(Brazil)	ST / CF / CAM	2019	Kedah
10	Rufino Segovia	(Spain)	ST / LW / CAM	2017	(Hong Kong) Kitchee SC
11	Wan Zack Haikal	(Malaysia)	LW / RW / CF / CAM	2018	FELDA United
12	Ifedayo Olusegun	(Nigeria)	ST / LW / RW	2019	(Bahrain) Al-Riffa
17	Amri Yahyah	(Malaysia)	CAM / LW / RW / ST	2017	Melaka United
Loan out
3	K. Kannan	(Malaysia)	LB / LWB	2016	Youth system
8	Faizzudin Abidin	(Malaysia)	RW / LW / CAM	2016	Youth system
28	Asraff Hayqal	(Malaysia)	CM / CAM / LM / RM	2019	Youth system

=== Reserve Team Squad ===
No.	Name	Nationality	Position(s)	Since	Signed from
Selangor II, III & IV
—	Amirul Haziq	(Malaysia)	CB	2017	Youth system
—	Kugan Dhevarajan	(Malaysia)	LW / LM	2017	Youth system
—	Badrul Amin	(Malaysia)	ST	2017	Youth system
29	Azizul Baharuddin	(Malaysia)	ST	2017	Youth system
Loan out
—	Amirul Ashraf	(Malaysia)	CB / LB	2016	Youth system

== Transfers ==
=== First transfers ===
==== Transfers in ====
Date	No.	Pos.	Name	Age	Moving from	Type	Transfer fee	Team	Ref.
7 November 2018	22	MF	(Malaysia) Syazwan Zainon	28	(Malaysia) Kedah	Contract expired	Free transfer	First team	
3 December 2018	18	MF	(Malaysia) Halim Saari	24	(Malaysia) Kedah	Contract expired	Free transfer	First team	
4 December 2018	19	DF	(Malaysia) K. Prabakaran	27	(Malaysia) FELDA United	Contract expired	Free transfer	First team	
5 December 2018	21	MF	(Malaysia) Norhakim Isa	25	(Malaysia) PKNP	Contract expired	Free transfer	First team	
7 December 2018	15	MF	(Malaysia) Faiz Nasir	26	(Malaysia) Terengganu	Contract expired	Free transfer	First team	
9 December 2018	13	MF	(Malaysia) Latiff Suhaimi	29	(Malaysia) Terengganu	Contract expired	Free transfer	First team	
10 December 2018	25	DF	(Malaysia) Azreen Zulkafali	29	(Malaysia) FELDA United	Contract expired	Free transfer	First team	
12 December 2018	30	GK	(Malaysia) Farizal Harun	32	(Malaysia) FELDA United	Contract expired	Free transfer	First team	
14 December 2018	11	FW	(Malaysia) Wan Zack Haikal	27	(Malaysia) FELDA United	Contract expired	Free transfer	First team	
14 December 2018	16	MF	(Malaysia) Nurridzuan Abu Hassan	26	(Malaysia) PKNS	Contract expired	Free transfer	First team	
14 December 2018	28	DF	(Malaysia) Asraff Hayqal	21	(Malaysia) Youth system	Promoted	N/A	First team	
1 January 2019	9†	FW	(Grenada) Antonio German†	27	(India) Gokulam Kerala	Contract expired	Free transfer	First team	
1 January 2019	14	MF	(Brazil) Endrick	23	(Malaysia) Felcra	Contract expired	Free transfer	First team	
5 January 2019	26	MF	(Vietnam) (Czech Republic) Michal Nguyễn	29	(Thailand) Air Force Central	Contract expired	Free transfer	First team	
10 January 2019	5	DF	(Australia) Taylor Regan	30	(Australia) Adelaide United	Transfer	$50,000	First team	
20 February 2019	8	FW	(Malaysia) Khyril Muhymeen	31	(Malaysia) Perlis	Contract expired	Free transfer	First team	
20 February 2019	9	FW	(Brazil) Sandro	35	(Malaysia) Kedah	Contract expired	Free transfer	First team	

† Player left the club before transfer window closed.

==== Loans in ====
Date	No.	Pos.	Name	Age	Loaned from	Type	On loan until	Transfer fee	Team	Ref.
20 February 2019	3	DF	(Malaysia) Fandi Othman	26	(Malaysia) PKNS	Loan	End of season	Swap deal (with K. Kannan)	First team	

==== Transfers out ====
Date	No.	Pos.	Name	Age	Moving to	Type	Transfer fee	Team	Ref.
28 November 2018	4	MF	(Malaysia) Halim Zainal	30	(Malaysia) Negeri Sembilan	Contract expired	Free transfer	First team	
28 November 2018	12	FW	(Malaysia) Azamuddin Akil	33	(Malaysia) Kedah	Contract expired	Free transfer	First team	
28 November 2018	13	DF	(Malaysia) Razman Roslan	34	(Malaysia) Melaka United	Contract expired	Free transfer	First team	
28 November 2018	19	MF	(Malaysia) Joseph Kalang Tie	31	(Malaysia) Kuching	Contract expired	Free transfer	First team	
28 November 2018	21	GK	(Malaysia) Norazlan Razali	32	(Malaysia) FELDA United	Contract expired	Free transfer	First team	
28 November 2018	26	DF	(Malaysia) Fairuz Abdul Aziz	33	Free agent	Contract expired	Free transfer	First team	
28 November 2018	29	MF	(Malaysia) Shahrul Igwan	24	(Malaysia) Kedah	Contract expired	Free transfer	First team	
1 December 2018	8	MF	(Malaysia) Saiful Ridzuwan	26	(Malaysia) Melaka United	Contract expired	Free transfer	First team	
16 December 2018	6	MF	(Indonesia) Evan Dimas	23	(Indonesia) Barito Putera	Contract expired	Free transfer	First team	
16 December 2018	14	MF	(Spain) Alfonso Cruz	32	(Indonesia) PSS Sleman	Contract expired	Free transfer	First team	
16 December 2018	18	FW	(Indonesia) Ilham Armaiyn	22	(Indonesia) Bhayangkara	Contract expired	Free transfer	First team	
16 December 2018	23	DF	(Brazil) Willian Pacheco	26	(Indonesia) Bali United	Contract expired	Free transfer	First team	
18 February 2019	9	FW	(Grenada) Antonio German	27	Free agent	Contract termination	Released	First team	

==== Loans out ====
Date	No.	Pos.	Name	Age	Loaned to	Type	On loan until	Transfer fee	Team	Ref.
16 February 2019	5	DF	(Malaysia) Amirul Ashraf	21	(Malaysia) UiTM	Loan	End of season	N/A	Reserve team	
16 February 2019	8	MF	(Malaysia) Faizzudin Abidin	22	(Malaysia) Penang	Loan	End of season	N/A	First team	
16 February 2019	28	MF	(Malaysia) Asraff Hayqal	22	(Malaysia) UiTM	Loan	End of season	N/A	First team	
20 February 2019	3	DF	(Malaysia) K. Kannan	22	(Malaysia) PKNS	Loan	End of season	Swap deal (with Fandi Othman)	First team	

=== Second transfers ===
2–29 May 2019

==== Transfers in ====
Date	No.	Pos.	Name	Age	Moving from	Type	Transfer fee	Team	Ref.
4 May 2019	12	FW	(Nigeria) Ifedayo Olusegun	28	Free agent	Transfer	Free transfer	First team	

== Pre-season and friendlies ==
22 December 2018 Friendly	Selangor (Malaysia)	1–1	(Malaysia) Penang	Cyberjaya, Selangor
17:00 UTC+08:00	Sean 90'	Report	Bottaro 68' (pen.)	Stadium: MMU Stadium

29 December 2018 Friendly	PKNP (Malaysia)	2–0	(Malaysia) Selangor	Manjung, Perak
20:00 UTC+08:00	Glišić 13'; Hasnan 16'	Report		Stadium: Manjung Stadium

2 January 2019 Friendly	Selangor (Malaysia)	1–2	(Malaysia) UiTM	Subang Jaya, Selangor
20:45 UTC+08:00	Sean 28'	Report	56'; Zulkifli 82'	Stadium: MPSJ Stadium

5 January 2019 Friendly	Kuala Lumpur (Malaysia)	2–3	(Malaysia) Selangor	Cheras, Kuala Lumpur
20:45 UTC+08:00	Syazwan 58'; Josué 89'	Report	Sean 7'; Zack 69'; Amri 90+3' (pen.)	Stadium: KLFA Stadium

9 January 2019 Friendly	UKM (Malaysia)	5–2	(Malaysia) Selangor	Bangi, Selangor
20:45 UTC+08:00	Sunday 10', 12', 49'; Yuki 45' (pen.); Ricardo 79'	Report	Syazwan 23'; German 35'	Stadium: INSPEN Stadium

11 January 2019 Friendly	Puchong Fuerza (Malaysia)	0–6	(Malaysia) Selangor	Subang Jaya, Selangor
20:45 UTC+08:00		Report	Prabakaran 10'; Rufino 31', 41'; German 39'; Faiz 53'; Sean 83'	Stadium: 3K Sports Complex

22 January 2019 Friendly	Selangor (Malaysia)	3–1	(Singapore) Home United	Kuala Lumpur, Malaysia
20:45 UTC+08:00	German 13'; Rufino 65', 77'	Report	Syahin 50'	Stadium: UM Arena Stadium

14 January 2019 Tour of Thailand	MOF Customs United (Thailand)	0–3	(Malaysia) Selangor	Mueang Chonburi District, Chonburi
18:00 UTC+08:00		Report	Rufino 42', 52'; Endrick 63'	Stadium: IPE Stadium

15 January 2019 Tour of Thailand	Chonburi (Thailand)	1–1	(Malaysia) Selangor	Mueang Chonburi District, Chonburi
16:00 UTC+08:00	Lukian 87'	Report	Faiz 23'	Stadium: IPE Stadium

17 January 2019 Tour of Thailand	Thai Honda (Thailand)	1–2	(Malaysia) Selangor	Mueang Chonburi District, Chonburi
18:00 UTC+08:00	Valdo 86'	Report	Rufino 19'; German 45+1' (pen.)	Stadium: IPE Stadium

== Competitions ==
=== Overall record ===
Competition	First match	Last match	Starting round	Final position	Record							
Competition	First match	Last match	Starting round	Final position	Pld	W	D	L	GF	GA	GD	Win %
Super League	3 February 2019	20 July 2019	Matchday 1	3rd	22	10	7	5	41	35	+6	45.45
FA Cup	2 April 2019	16 April 2019	Second Round	Third Round	2	1	0	1	4	2	+2	50.00
Malaysia Cup	3 August 2019	26 October 2019	Group stage	Semi-finals	10	3	4	3	13	13	+0	30.00
Total					34	14	11	9	58	50	+8	41.18

Source: Soccerway

=== Super League ===
==== Table ====
Pos	Team	Pld	W	D	L	GF	GA	GD	Pts	Qualification or relegation
1	Johor Darul Ta'zim (C)	22	16	5	1	49	19	+30	53	Qualification for AFC Champions League group stage
2	Pahang	22	12	7	3	37	21	+16	43	
3	Selangor	22	10	7	5	41	35	+6	37	
4	Kedah (Note: Kedah FA qualified for the AFC Champions League preliminary round 2 as Malaysia FA Cup winners.)	22	9	7	6	37	29	+8	34	Qualification for AFC Champions League preliminary round 2
5	Perak	22	8	9	5	36	31	+5	33	

Source: MFL
Rules for classification: 1) Points; 2) Goal difference; 3) Number of goals scored.
(C) Champions

==== Results summary ====
Overall								Home						Away					
Pld	W	D	L	GF	GA	GD	Pts	W	D	L	GF	GA	GD	W	D	L	GF	GA	GD
22	10	7	5	41	35	+6	37	7	3	2	24	18	+6	3	4	3	17	17	0

Source: Super League fixtures and results

==== Results by matchday ====
Win Draw Loss

Round	1	2	3	4	5	6	7	8	9	10	11	12	13	14	15	16	17	18	19	20	21	22
Ground	H	A	H	A	H	A	H	A	H	H	A	H	H	A	A	H	A	H	A	A	H	A
Result	D	D	L	D	L	W	W	W	D	W	D	D	W	D	L	W	L	W	W	L	W	W
Position	7	6	9	9	10	9	7	5	4	3	3	4	3	4	5	3	5	4	3	5	4	3

Source: Super League fixtures and results
A = Away; H = Home; W = Win; D = Draw; L = Loss

==== Matches ====
The league fixtures were announced on 11 January 2019.

Win Draw Loss

3 February 2019 1	Selangor	1–1	FELDA United	Shah Alam, Selangor
21:00 UTC+08:00	German 41'	Report (1); Report (2)	Sadam (yellow card) 25'; Haziq (yellow card) 47'; Hadin 70' (yellow card) 81'	Stadium: Shah Alam Stadium; Attendance: 10,443; Referee: Suhaizi Shukri

9 February 2019 2	Petaling Jaya City	1–1	Selangor	Petaling Jaya, Selangor
21:00 UTC+08:00	Barathkumar (yellow card) 23'; Tinagaran (yellow card) 36'; Pedro (yellow card) 70' (goal) 80' (pen.); Ganiesh (yellow card) 90+5'	Report (1); Report (2)	Nguyễn (yellow card) 50'; Rufino 90+1' (pen.)	Stadium: Petaling Jaya Stadium; Attendance: 5,500; Referee: Suhaizi Shukri

17 February 2019 3	Selangor	0–4	PKNS	Shah Alam, Selangor
21:00 UTC+08:00	Nguyễn (yellow card) 23'	Report (1); Report (2)	Swirad 29'; Sherman 50'; Vathanaka 80'; Morales 90+2'	Stadium: Shah Alam Stadium; Attendance: 5,200; Referee: Khirulazuan Kidam

24 February 2019 4	Pahang	1–1	Selangor	Kuantan, Pahang
21:00 UTC+08:00	Zaharulnizam (yellow card) 18' (goal) 34'; Goulon (yellow card) 54' (yellow-red card) 73'; Safuwan (yellow card) 77'; Zé Love (yellow card) 90+1'	Report (1); Report (2)	Rufino 62'; Amri (yellow card) 90+1'	Stadium: Darul Makmur Stadium; Attendance: 18,019; Referee: Fairuzi Mat Desa

1 March 2019 5	Selangor	2–4	Johor Darul Ta'zim	Shah Alam, Selangor
21:00 UTC+08:00	Nguyễn (yellow card) 12'; Endrick 33'; Rufino 45+2'	Report (1); Report (2)	Maurício (yellow card) 5'; Velázquez 7', 69'; Diogo 14'; Cabrera 42' (yellow card) 58'; Adam (yellow card) 74'	Stadium: Shah Alam Stadium; Attendance: 21,616; Referee: Zohri Tajuddin

10 March 2019 6	Kuala Lumpur	2–3	Selangor	Cheras, Kuala Lumpur
21:00 UTC+08:00	Syafwan 5'; Indra 38'; Fitri (yellow card) 43'; Zhafri (yellow card) 45+2'	Report (1); Report (2)	Latiff (yellow card) 30'; Nurridzuan (yellow card) 45+2'; Sandro 67' (pen.); Syazwan 71' (yellow card) 79'; Amri 76' (yellow card) 77'	Stadium: KLFA Stadium; Attendance: 7,988; Referee: Fairuzi Mat Desa

29 March 2019 7	Selangor	1–0	Terengganu	Shah Alam, Selangor
21:00 UTC+08:00	Faiz 56'	Report (1); Report (2)	Kamal (yellow card) 77'; Khairu (yellow card) 90+5'	Stadium: Shah Alam Stadium; Attendance: 8,626; Referee: Zohri Tajuddin

6 April 2019 8	Melaka United	3–4	Selangor	Krubong, Malacca
21:00 UTC+08:00	Reichelt 20', 54'; Shukor (yellow card) 49'; Faris (yellow card) 57'; Marković 71' (yellow card) 72'	Report (1); Report (2)	Amri 8', 25'; Azreen (yellow card) 42'; Regan (yellow card) 52'; Sean 88', 90+4'	Stadium: Hang Jebat Stadium; Attendance: 5,282; Referee: Khirulazuan Kidam

12 April 2019 9	Selangor	1–1	Perak	Shah Alam, Selangor
21:00 UTC+08:00	Sandro 38'; Nurridzuan (yellow card) 48' (yellow-red card) 57'; Amri (yellow card) 53'; Sean (yellow card) 72'	Report (1); Report (2)	Hakim 35'; Anderson (yellow card) 38'; Dos Santos (yellow card) 53'; Firdaus (yellow card) 59'; Wander Luiz (yellow card) 59'; Brendan (yellow card) 83'; Khairil (yellow card) 86'	Stadium: Shah Alam Stadium; Attendance: 11,430; Referee: Zulkarnain Zakaria

20 April 2019 10	Selangor	2–1	PKNP	Shah Alam, Selangor
21:00 UTC+08:00	Sandro 14' (pen.); Prabakaran (yellow card) 48'; Syahmi 79'; Azreen (yellow card) 89'	Report (1); Report (2)	Farid (yellow card) 47'; Fazrul 85'	Stadium: Shah Alam Stadium; Attendance: 1,749; Referee: Suhaimi Mat Hassan

26 April 2019 11	Kedah	1–1	Selangor	Alor Setar, Kedah
21:00 UTC+08:00	Baddrol 41'; Alves (yellow card) 57'; Amirul (yellow card) 75'	Report (1); Report (2)	Sandro 18'; Regan (yellow card) 26'; Sean (yellow card) 44'; Azreen (yellow card) 72'	Stadium: Darulaman Stadium; Attendance: 11,410; Referee: Nazmi Nasaruddin

4 May 2019 12	Selangor	1–1	Melaka United	Shah Alam, Selangor
21:00 UTC+08:00	Syahmi 31'; Sarkunan (yellow card) 45+2'; Sean (yellow card) 45+3'	Report (1); Report (2)	Amirul (yellow card) 6'; Reichelt 60'	Stadium: Shah Alam Stadium; Attendance: 5,465; Referee: Hamdan Awang

15 May 2019 13	Selangor	3–1	Kedah	Shah Alam, Selangor
22:00 UTC+08:00	Ifedayo 35', 44', 57'; Nguyễn (yellow card) 42'; Namathevan (yellow card) 63'	Report (1); Report (2)	Amirul (yellow card) 35'; Rizal (yellow card) 40'; Bauman 65'	Stadium: Shah Alam Stadium; Attendance: 5,738; Referee: Nafeez Abd Wahab

18 May 2019 14	PKNP	1–1	Selangor	Manjung, Perak
22:00 UTC+08:00	Fazrul (yellow card) 45+1'; Mugenthirran 47'; Sukri (yellow card) 72'	Report (1); Report (2)	Ifedayo 29'; Namathevan (yellow card) 55'; Nguyễn (yellow card) 87'	Stadium: Manjung Municipal Council Stadium; Attendance: 1,116; Referee: Zohri Tajuddin

24 May 2019 15	Terengganu	1–0	Selangor	Kuala Terengganu, Terengganu
22:00 UTC+08:00	Nasrullah (yellow card) 79'; Faudzi (yellow card) 84'; Sarkunan 90+1' (o.g.); Adib (yellow card) 90+4'	Report (1); Report (2)	Azreen (yellow card) 18'; Nguyễn (yellow card) 61'; Sandro (yellow card) 79'; Namathevan (yellow card) 90+4'	Stadium: Sultan Ismail Nasiruddin Shah Stadium; Attendance: 1,500; Referee: Khirulazuan Kidam

15 June 2019 16	Selangor	2–1	Kuala Lumpur	Shah Alam, Selangor
21:00 UTC+08:00	Ifedayo 37'; Ashmawi (yellow card) 81'; Sandro 90+5' (pen.)	Report (1); Report (2)	de Paula 59' (pen.); Josué (yellow card) 70'; Woodland (yellow card) 90+4'	Stadium: Shah Alam Stadium; Attendance: 1,422; Referee: Fitri Maskon

19 June 2019 17	Johor Darul Ta'zim	3–2	Selangor	Johor Bahru, Johor
21:00 UTC+08:00	Cabrera 10'; Velázquez 12' (yellow card) 88'; Safawi 61'	Report (1); Report (2)	Regan (yellow card) 26'; Fandi (yellow card) 34'; Khyril 41'; Sarkunan (red card) 76'; Sandro 89' (pen.); Ashmawi (yellow card) 90'	Stadium: Larkin Stadium; Attendance: 7,890; Referee: Fairuzi Mat Desa

25 June 2019 18	Selangor	5–2	Pahang	Shah Alam, Selangor
21:00 UTC+08:00	Khyril 30'; Ifedayo 36', 43', 86'; Endrick 46' (yellow card) 84'	Report (1); Report (2)	Sharif (yellow card) 11'; Dinesh (yellow card) 29'; Afif (yellow card) 45+2'; Kogileswaran 68'; Sumareh 77'	Stadium: Shah Alam Stadium; Attendance: 3,357; Referee: Amirul Izwan Yaacob

7 July 2019 19	FELDA United	1–2	Selangor	Jengka, Pahang
21:00 UTC+08:00	Jocinei 64'; Watanabe (yellow card) 70'	Report (1); Report (2)	Nguyễn (yellow card) 22'; Sandro 44'; Ifedayo 51'	Stadium: Tun Abdul Razak Stadium; Attendance: 880; Referee: Majed Mohammed H Al-Shamrani

10 July 2019 20	Perak	3–2	Selangor	Ipoh, Perak
21:00 UTC+08:00	Careca 43', 63'; Leandro 45+3' (yellow card) 78'	Report (1); Report (2)	Regan (yellow card) 11' (goal) 29'; Halim (yellow card) 11'; Endrick 45'	Stadium: Perak Stadium; Attendance: 3,450; Referee: Zohri Tajuddin

13 July 2019 21	Selangor	3–0	Petaling Jaya City	Shah Alam, Selangor
21:00 UTC+08:00	Regan (yellow card) 27'; Endrick 43'; Khyril 57'; Ifedayo 61'	Report (1); Report (2)	Nasriq (yellow card) 48'; Tinagaran (yellow card) 62'	Stadium: Shah Alam Stadium; Attendance: 1,520; Referee: Suhaimi Mat Hassan

20 July 2019 22	PKNS	2–3	Selangor	Shah Alam, Selangor
21:00 UTC+08:00	Morales 3'; Firdaus Chew (yellow card) 63'; Kozubaev 79'; Akram (yellow card) 81'	Report (1); Report (2)	Sandro 40'; Ifedayo 44', 52'	Stadium: Shah Alam Stadium; Attendance: 2,475; Referee: Fairuzi Mat Desa

==== Results overview ====
Win Draw Loss

Team	Home score	Away score	Double
FELDA United	1–1	2–1	3–2
Johor Darul Ta'zim	2–4	2–3	4–7
Kedah	3–1	1–1	4–2
Kuala Lumpur	2–1	3–2	5–3
Melaka United	1–1	4–3	5–4
Petaling Jaya City	3–0	1–1	4–1
Pahang	5–2	1–1	6–3
Perak	1–1	2–3	3–4
PKNP	2–1	1–1	3–2
PKNS	0–4	3–2	3–6
Terengganu	1–0	0–1	1–1

=== FA Cup ===
2 April 2019 Second Round	Kelantan	0–3	Selangor	Kota Bharu, Kelantan
21:00 UTC+08:00	Danial (yellow card) 14'; Afiq (yellow card) 33'; Azwan (yellow card) 43'	Report (1); Report (2)	Nurridzuan (yellow card) 36'; Syazwan 61'; Faiz 65', 86'	Stadium: Sultan Muhammad IV Stadium; Attendance: 5,033; Referee: Zamzaidi Katimin

16 April 2019 Third Round	Selangor	1–2	FELDA United	Shah Alam, Selangor
21:00 UTC+08:00	Syahmi 56'; Halim (yellow card) 72'	Report (1); Report (2)	Haziq (yellow card) 53'; Thiago 65'; Anwar (yellow card) 79'; Hadin 89'	Stadium: Shah Alam Stadium; Attendance: 4,218; Referee: Mat Zan Abdul Wahab

=== Malaysia Cup ===
Selangor joined the competition in the group stage.

==== Group stage ====
Pos	Team	Pld	W	D	L	GF	GA	GD	Pts	Qualification	SEL	MEL	FEL	PDRM
1	Selangor	6	2	4	0	9	6	+3	10	Advance to knockout stage	—	1–1	2–2	1–1
2	Melaka United	6	2	2	2	10	9	+1	8	Advance to knockout stage	0–1	—	1–3	3–1
3	FELDA United	6	2	1	3	10	12	−2	7		0–2	1–3	—	1–0
4	PDRM	6	1	3	2	10	12	−2	6		2–2	2–2	4–3	—

Source: FAM MFL

3 August 2019 1	Selangor	2–2	FELDA United	Shah Alam, Selangor
21:00 UTC+8	Syazwan 34'; Ifedayo 40'	Report (1); Report (2)	Christie 42'; Khairul 86' (pen.)	Stadium: Shah Alam Stadium; Attendance: 3,134; Referee: Nazmi Nasaruddin

8 August 2019 2	Melaka United	0–1	Selangor	Krubong, Malacca
21:00 UTC+8	Ramzi (yellow card) 34'	Report (1); Report (2)	Suk-won 61' (o.g.); Nguyễn (yellow card) 54'; Khairulazhan (yellow card) 90+3'	Stadium: Hang Jebat Stadium; Attendance: 4,149; Referee: Suhaimi Mat Hassan

18 August 2019 3	Selangor	1–1	PDRM	Shah Alam, Selangor
21:00 UTC+8	Sandro 52'; Ifedayo (yellow card) 82'; Prabakaran (yellow card) 88'	Report (1); Report (2)	Azmizi (yellow card) 47'; Redžović 60'; Amir (yellow card) 64'; Ezrie (yellow card) 68'	Stadium: Shah Alam Stadium; Attendance: 2,110; Referee: Nafeez Abd Wahab

21 August 2019 4	PDRM	2–2	Selangor	Krubong, Malacca
21:00 UTC+8	Agba 28'; Wleh (yellow card) 42'; Shahril (yellow card) 78'; Chang-hoon 87'	Report (1); Report (2)	Regan 69'; Ifedayo 80'	Stadium: Hang Jebat Stadium; Attendance: 615; Referee: Fairuzi Mat Desa

14 September 2019 5	Selangor	1–1	Melaka United	Shah Alam, Selangor
21:00 UTC+8	Khyril 38'; Fandi (yellow card) 82'	Report (1); Report (2)	Saiful 49'; Balić (yellow card) 53'; Milunović (yellow card) 80'	Stadium: Shah Alam Stadium; Attendance: 2,511; Referee: Suhaimi Mat Hassan

18 September 2019 6	FELDA United	0–2	Selangor	Jengka, Pahang
21:00 UTC+8	Thiago (yellow card) 62' (yellow-red card) 87'; Jasazrin (yellow card) 77'	Report (2)	Ifedayo 16'; Regan (yellow card) 45+2'; Khyril 73'; Khairulazhan (yellow card) 79'	Stadium: Tun Abdul Razak Stadium; Attendance: 1,277; Referee: Fairuzi Mat Desa

==== Quarter-finals ====
22 September 2019 First leg	Perak	1–0	Selangor	Ipoh, Perak
21:00 UTC+8	Gan 13'	Report (1); Report (2)	Syahmi (yellow card) 29'	Stadium: Perak Stadium; Attendance: 10,200; Referee: Zohri Tajuddin

29 September 2019 Second leg	Selangor	3–1 (3–2 agg.)	Perak	Shah Alam, Selangor
21:00 UTC+8	Syazwan 34' (yellow card) 67'; Khyril (yellow card) 28' (goal) 45', 69'; Ifedayo (yellow card) 49'	Report (1); Report (2)	Leandro (yellow card) 36'; Gan 83'; Shahrel (yellow card) 84'	Stadium: Shah Alam Stadium; Attendance: 12,441; Referee: Suhaizi Shukri

==== Semi-finals ====
19 October 2019 First leg	Johor Darul Ta'zim	2–1	Selangor	Larkin, Johor Bahru, Johor
21:00 UTC+8	Syafiq 15'; Velázquez 49'	Report (2)	Ifedayo 17'; Prabakaran (yellow card) 45+1'; Halim (yellow card) 60'	Stadium: Tan Sri Dato' Haji Hassan Yunos Stadium; Attendance: 21,130; Referee: Fairuzi Mat Desa

26 October 2019 Second leg	Selangor	0–3 (1–5 agg.)	Johor Darul Ta'zim	Shah Alam, Selangor
21:00 UTC+8	Regan (yellow card) 31'; Halim (yellow card) 59'	Report (2)	Safawi 25', 46', 51'; Kunanlan (yellow card) 39'	Stadium: Shah Alam Stadium; Attendance: 65,317; Referee: Nazmi Nasaruddin

== Statistics ==
=== Squad statistics ===
As of 26 October 2019

Appearances (Apps.) numbers are for appearances in competitive games only including sub appearances.
\ Red card numbers denote: Numbers in parentheses represent red cards overturned for wrongful dismissal.

No.	Nat.	Player	Pos.	Super League				FA Cup				Malaysia Cup				Total			
No.	Nat.	Player	Pos.	Apps	Goal	Yellow card	Red card	Apps	Goal	Yellow card	Red card	Apps	Goal	Yellow card	Red card	Apps	Goal	Yellow card	Red card
1	(Malaysia)	Khairulazhan	GK	12								10		2		22		2	
2	(Malaysia)	A. Namathevan	DF	7		3						2				9		3	
3	(Malaysia)	Fandi Othman	DF	14		1		1				7		1		22		2	
4	(Malaysia)	Ashmawi Yakin	DF	4		2						1				5		2	
5	(Australia)	Taylor Regan	DF	19	1	5		1				10	1	2		30	2	7	
6	(Malaysia)	K. Sarkunan	MF	14		1	1	2				9				25		1	1
7	(Malaysia)	Sean Selvaraj	MF	18	2	3		2				7				27	2	3	
8	(Malaysia)	Khyril Muhymeen	FW	8	3			1				8	4	1		17	7	1	
9	(Grenada)	Antonio German †	FW	3	1											3	1		
9	(Brazil)	Sandro	FW	18	8	1		2				6	1			26	9	1	
10	(Spain)	Rufino Segovia	FW	6	3											6	3		
11	(Malaysia)	Wan Zack Haikal	FW																
12	(Nigeria)	Ifedayo Olusegun	FW	10	12							10	4	2		20	16	2	
13	(Malaysia)	Latiff Suhaimi	DF	12		1		2				5				19		1	
14	(Brazil)	Endrick	MF	14	4	1						8				22	4	1	
15	(Malaysia)	Faiz Nasir	MF	18	1			2	2			7				27	3		
16	(Malaysia)	Nurridzuan Abu Hassan	MF	12		1	1	1		1		3				16		2	1
17	(Malaysia)	Amri Yahyah	FW	14	3	3		2				5				21	3	3	
18	(Malaysia)	Halim Saari	MF	19		1		1		1		7		2		27		4	
19	(Malaysia)	K. Prabakaran	DF	14		1		2				6		2		22		3	
20	(Malaysia)	Syahmi Safari	MF	17	2			1	1			10		1		28	3	1	
21	(Malaysia)	Norhakim Isa	MF	2												2			
22	(Malaysia)	Syazwan Zainon	MF	16	1	1		2	1			7	2	1		25	4	2	
23	(Malaysia)	Haziq Ridwan	GK																
24	(Malaysia)	Syukri Azman	DF																
25	(Malaysia)	Azreen Zulkafali	DF	6		4		1								7		4	
26	(Vietnam)	Michal Nguyễn	DF	19		7		2				8		1		29		8	
27	(Malaysia)	M. Tamil Maran	DF																
29	(Malaysia)	Azizul Baharuddin	FW																
30	(Malaysia)	Farizal Harun	GK	10				2								12			
–	(Malaysia)	D. Kugan	MF																
Own goals					0				0				1				1		
Totals					41	36	2		4	2	0		13	15	0		58	53	2

† Player left the club during the season.

=== Goalscorers ===
Includes all competitive matches.

As of match played 26 October 2019

Rank	Pos.	No.	Player	Super League	FA Cup	Malaysia Cup	Total
1	FW	12	(Nigeria) Ifedayo Olusegun	12	0	4	16
2	FW	9	(Brazil) Sandro	8	0	1	9
3	MF	8	(Malaysia) Khyril Muhymeen	3	0	4	7
4	MF	14	(Brazil) Endrick	4	0	0	4
4	MF	22	(Malaysia) Syazwan Zainon	1	1	2	4
6	FW	10	(Spain) Rufino Segovia	3	0	0	3
6	MF	15	(Malaysia) Faiz Nasir	1	2	0	3
6	FW	17	(Malaysia) Amri Yahyah	3	0	0	3
6	MF	20	(Malaysia) Syahmi Safari	2	1	0	3
10	DF	5	(Australia) Taylor Regan	1	0	1	2
10	FW	7	(Malaysia) Sean Selvaraj	2	0	0	2
12	FW	9	(Grenada) Antonio German †	1	0	0	1
Own Goals				0	0	1	1
TOTALS				41	4	13	58
Own Goals Conceded
1	MF	6	(Malaysia) K. Sarkunan	1	0	0	1
TOTALS				1	0	0	1

† Player left the club during the season.

=== Top assists ===
Rnk	Pos	No.	Player	Super League	FA Cup	Malaysia Cup	Total
1	FW	9	(Brazil) Sandro	6	2	2	10
2	MF	22	(Malaysia) Syazwan Zainon	4	0	1	5
3	MF	15	(Malaysia) Faiz Nasir	4	0	0	4
3	DF	20	(Malaysia) Syahmi Safari	2	0	2	4
5	FW	12	(Nigeria) Ifedayo Olusegun	1	0	2	3
5	MF	14	(Brazil) Endrick	1	0	2	3
7	FW	17	(Malaysia) Amri Yahyah	1	1	0	2
7	MF	18	(Malaysia) Halim Saari	2	0	0	2
7	DF	19	(Malaysia) K. Prabakaran	1	0	1	2
7	DF	25	(Malaysia) Azreen Zulkafali	2	0	0	2
11	DF	3	(Malaysia) Fandi Othman	1	0	0	1
11	MF	6	(Malaysia) K. Sarkunan	1	0	0	1
11	FW	8	(Malaysia) Khyril Muhymeen	1	0	0	1
TOTALS				27	3	10	40

=== Clean sheets ===
Rnk	No.	Player	Super League	FA Cup	Malaysia Cup	Total
1	1	(Malaysia) Khairulazhan	1	0	2	3
2	30	(Malaysia) Farizal Harun	1	1	0	2
TOTALS			2	1	2	5

=== Disciplinary record ===
As of match played 26 October 2019

Rank	No.	Pos.	Name	Super League			FA Cup			Malaysia Cup			Total		
Rank	No.	Pos.	Name	Yellow card	(yellow card) (yellow-red card)	Red card	Yellow card	(yellow card) (yellow-red card)	Red card	Yellow card	(yellow card) (yellow-red card)	Red card	Yellow card	(yellow card) (yellow-red card)	Red card
1	26	DF	(Vietnam) Michal Nguyễn	7	-	-	-	-	-	1	-	-	8	-	-
2	5	DF	(Australia) Taylor Regan	5	-	-	-	-	-	2	-	-	7	-	-
3	18	MF	(Malaysia) Halim Saari	1	-	-	1	-	-	2	-	-	4	-	-
3	25	DF	(Malaysia) Azreen Zulkafali	4	-	-	-	-	-	-	-	-	4	-	-
5	2	DF	(Malaysia) A. Namathevan	3	-	-	-	-	-	-	-	-	3	-	-
5	7	FW	(Malaysia) Sean Selvaraj	3	-	-	-	-	-	-	-	-	3	-	-
5	17	FW	(Malaysia) Amri Yahyah	3	-	-	-	-	-	-	-	-	3	-	-
5	19	DF	(Malaysia) K. Prabakaran	1	-	-	-	-	-	2	-	-	3	-	-
9	1	GK	(Malaysia) Khairulazhan	-	-	-	-	-	-	2	-	-	2	-	-
9	3	DF	(Malaysia) Fandi Othman	1	-	-	-	-	-	1	-	-	2	-	-
9	4	DF	(Malaysia) Ashmawi Yakin	2	-	-	-	-	-	-	-	-	2	-	-
9	12	FW	(Nigeria) Ifedayo Olusegun	-	-	-	-	-	-	2	-	-	2	-	-
9	16	MF	(Malaysia) Nurridzuan Abu Hassan	1	1	-	1	-	-	-	-	-	2	1	-
9	22	MF	(Malaysia) Syazwan Zainon	1	-	-	-	-	-	1	-	-	2	-	-
15	6	MF	(Malaysia) K. Sarkunan	1	-	1	-	-	-	-	-	-	1	-	1
15	8	MF	(Malaysia) Khyril Muhymeen	-	-	-	-	-	-	1	-	-	1	-	-
15	9	FW	(Brazil) Sandro	1	-	-	-	-	-	-	-	-	1	-	-
15	13	DF	(Malaysia) Latiff Suhaimi	1	-	-	-	-	-	-	-	-	1	-	-
15	14	MF	(Brazil) Endrick	1	-	-	-	-	-	-	-	-	1	-	-
15	20	MF	(Malaysia) Syahmi Safari	-	-	-	-	-	-	1	-	-	1	-	-
Total				36	1	1	2	0	0	15	0	0	53	1	1
