= 2017 Selangor FA season =

2017 season of Malaysian association football club

Selangor FA
2017 season
- Chairman: Subahan Kamal (from 24 February)
- Manager: Abdul Rauf Ahmad
- Head coach: P. Maniam
- Stadium: Selayang Stadium
- Super League: 6th
- FA Cup: Second round
- Malaysia Cup: Quarter-finals
- Top goalscorer: League: (8 goals); Forkey Doe; All: (10 goals); Forkey Doe; Rufino Segovia
- Highest home attendance: 11,257; Super League; Selangor vs Johor Darul Ta'zim (5 August 2017)
- Lowest home attendance: 847; Super League; Selangor vs PKNS (20 September 2017)
- Average home league attendance: 5,718
- Biggest win: Super League; 2–0 v Penang (H) (21 January 2017); Super League; 3–1 v FELDA United (H) (17 February 2017); Super League; 2–0 v Kelantan (A) (25 February 2017); Super League; 4–2 v T–Team (H) (1 July 2017); Super League; 3–1 v Penang (A) (28 October 2017)
- Biggest defeat: Super League; 3–5 v PKNS (A) (4 February 2017); Super League; 0–2 v Pahang (H) (24 May 2017); Super League; 1–3 v FELDA United (A) (26 July 2017); Malaysia Cup; 1–3 v Johor Darul Ta'zim (A) (9 September 2017)
Home colours	Away colours	Third colours

The 2017 Selangor FA Season was Selangor FA's 12th season playing soccer in the Malaysia Super League since its inception in 2004.

Selangor FA began the season on 21 January 2017. They will also compete in two domestic cups, the Malaysia FA Cup and Malaysia Cup.

== Season Overview ==
=== Pre-season ===
(Squad Build and First Transfers)

Selangor started the summer in December when P. Maniam was officially announced as its new coach for one season. He appeared for his first press conference with the media on 28 December. K. Gunalan, last year's interim coach, will again serve as assistant coach for this season.

On 28 December 2016, P. Maniam added some new faces to the club's academy after losing several key players who moved to other teams. The players who were promoted to the first team were A. Namathevan, K. Kannan, Amirul Ashraf, Faizzudin Abidin, Badrul Amin, K. Sarkunan and Syahmi Safari.

On 30 December, Dato' Seri Mohamed Azmin Ali quit as president of the Football Association of Selangor (FAS), after having held the post for two years beginning in December 2014. Amirudin Shari also joined Azmin by resigning as team manager. They made this decision after seeing the failure of Selangor's executive officers (EXCO FAS) to submit a strategic plan for Selangor's state football management, including failing to update the professional administration organization for the FAS association. The problem give effects for Selangor to lose their home ground Shah Alam Stadium for the 2017 Malaysian League season, with internal politicking escalating into a crisis, which could derail the Red Giants' hopes on the original ground field. Due to problems, Selangor will play their official home matches for the entire season at the Selayang Stadium.

During the pre-season planning, P. Maniam also added some new local players for the season. Among them are: Afiq Azmi (Negeri Sembilan), Halim Zainal (Kuala Lumpur), K. Satish (PKNS), Fairuz Abdul Aziz (AirAsia FC) and Nurshamil Abd Ghani, a player who is on loan from Melaka United.

On 6 December, S. Subramaniam was released by Selangor. Azmi Muslim left the club on the same day, and was transferred to PKNS FC after three years with the Red Giants. Hazwan Bakri and R. Gopinathan were sold to Johor Darul Ta'zim for a fee of RM1 million (Malaysian ringgit), while Nazmi Faiz had already signed an agreement to join JDT when he was with Selangor FA last season. The following day, Shahrom Kalam, and Hafiz Kamal switched sides and joined Perak this season for an undisclosed fee, while Hadi Yahya joined them on a free transfer.

P. Maniam also added new foreign players from Liberia and Romania, Francis Forkey Doe and Victoraș Astafei to replace foreign players from last season, Mauro Olivi and Patrick Wleh, whose contracts were not renewed for the current season. Patrick Wleh returned to PKNS FC following the end of his loan spell after Selangor decided not to make the loan move a permanent deal. Mauro Olivi has been released after not being offered a new contract.

Selangor agreed on a contract extension with import defender Ugo Ukah, keeping him with the club for one more year. Quota imports from Asia, Andik Vermansyah still remains with the team, with a year left on his contract. However, he sustained an ACL injury forcing Andik to rest for 5–6 months causing him to be dismissed from the team for this season. Import player Asia status will be filled by Timor-Leste players, Juliano Mineiro, who will replace him temporarily after signing a six-month contract.

=== Mid-season ===
(Second Transfers)

On second transfers day, Selangor reached an agreement with Melaka United on 17 May for AFC Cup winner Amri Yahyah, who re-joined the team for an undisclosed fee. Two days later, Selangor announced Victoraș Astafei will be released to make way for the original import, Andik Vermansyah, who will take Astafei's place until the end of the season.

On 9 June, before the second transfer window closed, Selangor officially signed a new import player from Spain, Rufino Segovia, to replace Juliano Mineiro, whose contract expired at the end of the month.

=== Pre-season and Friendlies Match ===
Selangor announced their first fixture of the 2017 pre-season schedule on 25 December 2016. On 29 December, Selangor began its pre-season campaign against Sime Darby at the training field in Shah Alam. The match finished as a goalless draw.

The next fixture, Selangor visited PDRM on 6 January at PULAPOL, Kuala Lumpur. Selangor won the match 2–1, with goals from K. Kannan and Forkey Doe. Victory against PDRM is the first pre-season win for the team.

Five days later, Selangor faced Terengganu, last season's Super League relegation team, at Selayang Stadium. Selangor won the match 2–0, with goals from two import trials, Mohamed Talaat and Kamil Poźniak.

The next day, Selangor continued their friendly matches against a club from the FAM league (third division), MOF FC. Selangor won 1–0, with a goal scored by import trials, Tiago Chulapa. It was the Red Giants' third victory after four friendly matches.

Selangor meet Kuala Lumpur for the next game on 14 January at SUK field in Shah Alam, which Kuala Lumpur won 1–0 with a goal scored by Kuala Lumpur import trials, Carlos Chamorro.

In the final matchday of the pre-season, Selangor faced another FAM league club, Petaling Jaya Rangers on the SUK field. The Red Giants lost again, 1–0, thanks to a goal from a local player, Badrul Afendy. It was the team's second defeat in six friendly matches.

Overall, Selangor finished the pre-season friendlies with 2 wins, 1 draw and 2 defeats.

=== January ===
On 21 January, Selangor officially kicked off its Super League campaign, playing at home to Penang. Maniam fielded a 3–4–3 formation, while playing a style of defending and attacking football. Selangor went on to win the match 2–0, with goals from Adam Nor Azlin and Forkey Doe, ensuring Maniam got off to a winning start.

On 27 January, Selangor was unable to progress up the table, recording a 1–1 home draw against Melaka United. Although there was a goal from Selangor's new import signings, Victoraș Astafei, one goal from Melaka United player, Khairu Azrin held Selangor to a draw.

=== February ===
On 4 February, despite one goal from Syahmi Safari and two goals from Forkey Doe, Selangor came up short with a 5–3 away defeat to PKNS. This was their first defeat in the league after three games.

Their next away game, against defending champions Johor Darul Ta'zim, ended goalless as well meaning Selangor were down in eighth place.

On 14 February, in the first FA Cup match against Negeri Sembilan, Selangor were eliminated at home with 3–4 penalty shoot-out, after the match finished as a goalless draw 0–0 (including extra-time).

Three days later, in their fifth match of the league campaign, Selangor recorded a 3–1 home win against Felda United, following three goals from Astafei, Raimi Mohd Noor and Juliano Mineiro ensured the Red Giants side the victory.

On 24 February, Selangor FA (FAS) finally found a new president, Datuk Seri Subahan Kamal, who replaced former chief Dato' Seri Mohamed Azmin Ali who stepped down from the post before the start of the season.

On 25 February, Selangor faced Kelantan in an away game, which had ended 0–2 to Selangor. A brace from Mineiro helped collect another three points. That results meant Selangor climbed to third place at the end of the month.

=== March ===
Selangor started the new month at home with a 1–1 draw against Kedah. Sandro opened the scoring for the visitors, before Selangor equalized the score with a late goal from Mineiro.

In the last match in March, Selangor suffered their first defeat at home, after a 0–1 loss against Perak. On the league table, Selangor were down to fifth place.

=== April ===
After the international break, Selangor continued their league match on 8 April with a narrow 2–1 victory against Sarawak at home, which saw Selangor climb up to fourth place. The two goals were scored by Astafei and Forkey Doe.

On 15 April, Selangor went against Pahang as visitors. And with goals from Mineiro and Forkey Doe, the match ended up in a draw with the final result being 2–2.

Selangor visited T–Team on 26 April, the next match day, and lost 0–1, with a goal from Fauzi Abdul Kadar in the 89th minute. That result means Selangor has finished their first round in the league with 4 wins, 4 draws and 3 defeats.

=== May ===
On 8 May, Selangor began the second round in the league as visitors with a 1–1 draw against Sarawak. The goal Selangor goal was scored by Rizal Fahmi, after Sarawak player Mateo Roskam opened the scoring.

On 24 May, Selangor continued its winless streak—no wins in four matches in a row— after losing to Pahang 2–0 at home. Two goals from striker import visitors, Matheus Alves at the 74th and 83rd minutes ensured victory for Pahang. The defeat saw Selangor drop down to fifth place before the league break during the month of Ramadan.

On 22 May, Selangor were drawn into Group D of the Malaysia Cup alongside Johor Darul Ta'zim, Sarawak, and Terengganu.

=== July ===
After a one-month break, Selangor opened July, and continued their league match, against T–Team at home. The Red Giants won the encounter 4–2 due to goals from Forkey Doe, Rufino Segovia and a double from Syahmi Safari. Dilshod Sharofetdinov and Yannick N'Djeng scored for T–Team.

On 4 July, Selangor opened their Malaysia Cup campaign, against Terengganu at home. The match ended in a 1–1 draw with goals by Rufino Segovia (43rd minute) for Selangor and Issey Nakajima-Farran (64th minute) for Terengganu.

In the second matchday of the Malaysia Cup group stage on 8 July, they visited Sarawak State Stadium to face Sarawak. The Red Giants was able to squeeze out a 1–2 win after goals from Forkey Doe and one own goal from Sarawak players, Dzulazlan Ibrahim. Sarawak's goal was scored by Shreen Tambi. This was their first win in the current season's Malaysia Cup campaign.

Three days later, Selangor's second game of July in the Super League saw the Red Giants visiting Perak for an away game. A goal from Forkey Doe was all that was required for Selangor to collect three points in a 0–1 win. Despite winning, they also get a less agreeable results, by collecting nine yellow cards and one red card (Andik had been sent off).

For the next league game on 15 July, Selangor visited Kedah. The Red Giants came home without victory after a 1–1 draw at Darulaman Stadium, with only one goal each from S. Veenod (Selangor) and Ken Ilsø (Kedah).

On 18 July, Selangor played the matchday third of Malaysia Cup campaign against Johor Darul Ta'zim at home. Goals from Fairuz Abdul Aziz and a brace by Amri Yahyah gave the Red Giants a comfortable 3–2 win. With this victory, Selangor moved to the top spot in Group D, leaving JDT behind with 3 points difference.

Selangor played their 17th Super League match at home on 22 July and won 1–0 against Kelantan, with the only goal scored by Amri Yahyah. The Red Giants set a new record for the season by maintaining five wins and two draws after seven matches (including the Malaysia Cup match).

On 26 July, Selangor's seven-match unbeaten streak came to an end as they lost to FELDA United 3–1 at Tun Abdul Razak Stadium. The Red Giants goal was scored by Forkey Doe.

Taking on Terengganu at the fourth matchday of the Malaysia Cup campaign, Selangor was able to get a narrow 3–2 victory, with goals from Forkey Doe, Syahmi Safari and Rufino Segovia. With this victory, the Red Giants booked their spot in the quarter final two matchdays before the group stage finished.

=== August ===
On 2 August, Selangor suffered their first Malaysia Cup loss of the season with a 2–1 loss at home against Sarawak. A goal from Ugo Ukah was not enough to secure the victory.

Back to the Super League, Selangor took on Johor Darul Ta'zim at home. Despite an early goal by Natxo Insa in the first half, Amri Yahyah and Andik Vermansyah scored in the second half to give Selangor a 2–1 victory. Despite being defeated by the Red Giants, JDT was crowned Super League champion that night, after their closest rival, Kedah, lost to Pahang 2–1. After this, the league took a month-long break to give way for the Malaysian national squad and the under-22 international friendly matches, and the 2017 SEA Games football matches.

=== September ===
On 9 September 2017, in the last match of the group stage against Johor Darul Ta'zim, Selangor lost 3–1 despite a goal from Rufino Segovia, which resulted in the team finishing second in the group stage of the Malaysia Cup. The next day, in the draw for the quarter-finals of the Malaysia Cup, Selangor faced Kedah once again.

Selangor lost 2–3 to Kedah in the first leg of the 2017 Malaysia Cup quarter-final on 15 September. Rufino Segovia scored the Red Giants' two goals.

On 20 September, Selangor lost their third game in row after being defeated at home by fierce rival PKNS with a scoreline of 1–2. Shahrul Azhar Ture, Patrick Wleh (PKNS) and Rufino Segovia provided the goals.

On 24 September, Selangor lost 1–0 in the quarter-finals of the Malaysia Cup against Kedah in the second leg, which meant the Red Giants bade farewell to the Malaysia Cup after being unable to break down a resilient Kedah backline.

Selangor suffered their fifth loss in a row on 27 September as they were out-played by Melaka United in a 2–1 away defeat, despite Rufino's second-half goal, his 8th goal for the team this season. On the league table, that result means Selangor were down to sixth place.

=== October ===
In their last match of the season against Penang on 28 October, Selangor were able to get a 3–1 victory after goals from Andik Vermansyah and a brace from Rufino. That win meant the Red Giants finished 6th in the league table.

== Kit ==
Supplier: Lotto / Sponsor: Selangor

Home	Away	Third	Goalkeeper

== Players ==
=== First Team Squad ===
No.	Name	Nationality	Position(s)	Since	Signed from
Goalkeepers
1	Khairulazhan Khalid	(Malaysia)	GK	2016	Pahang
21	Norazlan Razali	(Malaysia)	GK	2015	Johor Darul Ta'zim
22	Zarif Irfan	(Malaysia)	GK	2016	AirAsia
Defenders
2	A. Namathevan	(Malaysia)	RB / RWB	2016	Youth system
3	K. Kannan	(Malaysia)	LB / LWB / LW / RW	2016	Youth system
12	Bunyamin Umar	(Malaysia)	RB / CB / DM	2009	UPB-MyTeam
13	Razman Roslan (captain)	(Malaysia)	CB / RB	2016	Pahang
15	Raimi Mohd Nor	(Malaysia)	LB / RB	2013	FELDA United
17	Rizal Fahmi	(Malaysia)	CB / RB	2014	Kelantan
18	Ugo Ukah	(Nigeria)	CB	2016	(Greece) AEL Kalloni
26	Fairuz Abdul Aziz	(Malaysia)	LB / CB / RB	2017	AirAsia
Midfielders
4	Halim Zainal	(Malaysia)	CM / DM	2017	Kuala Lumpur
5	K. Satish	(Malaysia)	RM / LM / CM	2016	PKNS
7	Andik Vermansyah	(Indonesia)	LW / RW / F9	2014	(Indonesia) Persebaya 1927
8	Saiful Ridzuwan	(Malaysia)	DM / CM	2015	Harimau Muda A
20	Syahmi Safari	(Malaysia)	RW / LW / LM / RM	2016	Youth system
23	S. Veenod	(Malaysia)	CM / RM / LM	2012	USM
24	Fitri Shazwan	(Malaysia)	LW / RW / CM / CAM	2006	Youth system
Forwards
9	Adam Nor Azlin	(Malaysia)	CB / CAM / ST	2016	Harimau Muda A
10	Forkey Doe	(Liberia)	ST	2017	FELDA United
19	Afiq Azmi	(Malaysia)	ST	2016	Negeri Sembilan
27	Nurshamil Abd Ghani	(Malaysia)	ST	2017	Melaka United
29	Amri Yahyah	(Malaysia)	CAM / LW / RW / ST	2017	Melaka United
30	Rufino Segovia	(Spain)	ST / LW / CAM	2017	(Hong Kong) Kitchee
Player left the club during the season
28	Juliano Mineiro	(Timor-Leste)	CAM / CM	2017	(Japan) Kashiwa Reysol
30	Victoraș Astafei	(Romania)	LW / LM / ST	2017	(Romania) Botoșani

=== Reserve Team Squad ===
No.	Name	Nationality	Position(s)	Since	Signed from
Youth System
6	Amirul Ashraf	(Malaysia)	CB / LB	2016	Youth system
11	Faizzudin Abidin	(Malaysia)	RW / LW / AM	2016	Youth system
14	Badrul Amin	(Malaysia)	ST / FW	2016	Youth system
16	K. Sarkunan	(Malaysia)	DM / CM	2016	Youth system
33	M. Tamil Maran	(Malaysia)	CB / DM	2016	Youth system

== Transfers ==
=== First transfers ===
31 October 2016 – 22 January 2017

==== Transfers in ====
Date	No.	Pos.	Name	Age	Moving from	Type	Transfer fee	Team
18 December 2016	2	DF	(Malaysia) A. Namathevan	20	(Malaysia) Youth system	Promoted	N/A	First team
18 December 2016	3	DF	(Malaysia) K. Kannan	20	(Malaysia) Youth system	Promoted	N/A	First team
18 December 2016	5	MF	(Malaysia) K. Satish	22	(Malaysia) PKNS	Contract expired	Free transfer	First team
18 December 2016	6	DF	(Malaysia) Amirul Ashraf	18	(Malaysia) Youth system	Promoted	N/A	Reserve team
18 December 2016	11	MF	(Malaysia) Faizzudin Abidin	20	(Malaysia) Youth system	Promoted	N/A	Reserve team
18 December 2016	14	FW	(Malaysia) Badrul Amin	19	(Malaysia) Youth system	Promoted	N/A	Reserve team
18 December 2016	16	MF	(Malaysia) K. Sarkunan	20	(Malaysia) Youth system	Promoted	N/A	Reserve team
18 December 2016	19	FW	(Malaysia) Afiq Azmi	27	(Malaysia) Negeri Sembilan	Contract expired	Free transfer	First team
18 December 2016	20	MF	(Malaysia) Syahmi Safari	18	(Malaysia) Youth system	Promoted	N/A	First team
18 December 2016	26	DF	(Malaysia) Fairuz Abdul Aziz	31	(Malaysia) Air Asia	Free agent	Free transfer	First team
2 January 2017	4	MF	(Malaysia) Halim Zainal	28	(Malaysia) Kuala Lumpur	Contract expired	Free transfer	First team
2 January 2017	10	FW	(Liberia) Forkey Doe	31	(Malaysia) FELDA United	Contract expired	Free transfer	First team
20 January 2017	30	MF	(Romania) Victoraș Astafei	29	(Romania) Botoșani	Contract expired	Free transfer	First team
22 January 2017	28	MF	(Timor-Leste) Juliano Mineiro	30	(Japan) Kashiwa Reysol	Free agent	Free transfer	First team

==== Loans in ====
Date	No.	Pos.	Name	Age	Loaned from	Type	On loan until	Transfer fee	Team
18 January 2017	27	FW	(Malaysia) Nurshamil Abd Ghani	22	(Malaysia) Melaka United	Loan	End of season	Free transfer	First team

==== Transfers out ====
Date	No.	Pos.	Name	Age	Moving to	Type	Transfer fee	Team
16 November 2016	4	FW	(Liberia) Patrick Wleh	25	(Malaysia) PKNS	Loan return	—	First team
16 November 2016	10	MF	(Malaysia) Nazmi Faiz	22	(Malaysia) Johor Darul Ta'zim	Contract expired	Free transfer	First team
18 November 2016	16	FW	(Argentina) Mauro Olivi	33	(Argentina) Club Atlético Liniers	Contract expired	Free transfer	First team
6 December 2016	3	DF	(Malaysia) Azmi Muslim	30	(Malaysia) PKNS	Contract expired	Free transfer	First team
6 December 2016	19	DF	(Malaysia) S. Subramaniam	31	(Malaysia) Kelantan	Contract expired	Free transfer	First team
12 December 2016	11	FW	(Malaysia) Hazwan Bakri	25	(Malaysia) Johor Darul Ta'zim	Transfer	£181,223	First team
20 December 2016	5	DF	(Malaysia) Shahrom Kalam	31	(Malaysia) Perak	Transfer	Undisclosed	First team
20 December 2016	21	MF	(Malaysia) Hafiz Kamal	29	(Malaysia) Perak	Transfer	Undisclosed	First team
23 December 2016	14	FW	(Malaysia) Hadi Yahya	31	(Malaysia) Perak	Contract expired	Free transfer	First team
27 December 2016	25	MF	(Malaysia) R. Gopinathan	27	(Malaysia) Johor Darul Ta'zim	Transfer	£181,223	First team

=== Second transfers ===
15 May – 11 June 2017

==== Transfers in ====
Date	No.	Pos.	Name	Age	Moving from	Type	Transfer fee	Team
17 May 2017	29	FW	(Malaysia) Amri Yahyah	36	(Malaysia) Melaka United	Transfer	Undisclosed	First team
9 June 2017	30	FW	(Spain) Rufino Segovia	32	(Hong Kong) Kitchee	Contract expired	Free transfer	First team

==== Transfers out ====
Date	No.	Pos.	Name	Age	Moving to	Type	Transfer fee	Team
19 May 2017	30	MF	(Romania) Victoraș Astafei	29	(Romania) Sepsi Sfântu Gheorghe	Contract expired	Free transfer	First team
9 June 2017	28	MF	(Timor-Leste) Juliano Mineiro	31	(Kuwait) Kazma	Contract expired	Free transfer	First team

== Pre-season and friendlies ==
29 December 2016 Friendly	Selangor (Malaysia)	0–0	(Malaysia) Sime Darby	Shah Alam, Selangor
17:00 UTC+08:00		Report		Stadium: Training Court Sime Darby; Attendance: 50

6 January 2017 Friendly	PDRM (Malaysia)	1–2	(Malaysia) Selangor	Kuala Lumpur
17:00 UTC+08:00	Bakary 32'	Report	Kannan 4'; Forkey Doe 41' (pen.)	Stadium: PULAPOL Court; Attendance: 46

11 January 2017 Friendly	Selangor (Malaysia)	2–0	(Malaysia) Terengganu	Selayang, Selangor
17:00 UTC+08:00	Talaat 72'; Poźniak 90+2'	Report		Stadium: Selayang Stadium; Attendance: 500

12 January 2017 Friendly	Selangor (Malaysia)	1–0	(Malaysia) MOF	Shah Alam, Selangor
17:00 UTC+08:00	Tiago 65' (pen.)	Report		Stadium: SUK Court; Attendance: 30

14 January 2017 Friendly	Selangor (Malaysia)	0–1	(Malaysia) Kuala Lumpur	Shah Alam, Selangor
20:45 UTC+08:00		Report	Chamorro 55'	Stadium: SUK Court; Attendance: 125

16 January 2017 Friendly	Selangor (Malaysia)	0–1	(Malaysia) Petaling Jaya Rangers	Shah Alam, Selangor
17:00 UTC+08:00		Report	Badrul Afendy 72'	Stadium: SUK Court; Attendance: 30

== Competitions ==
=== Overview ===
Competition	First match	Last match	Starting round	Final position	Record							
Competition	First match	Last match	Starting round	Final position	Pld	W	D	L	GF	GA	GD	Win %
Malaysia Super League	21 January 2017	28 October 2017	Matchday 1	6th	22	9	6	7	32	28	+4	40.91
Malaysia FA Cup	14 February 2017		Second round	Second round	1	0	1	0	0	0	+0	0.00
Malaysia Cup	4 July 2017	24 September 2017	Group stage	Quarter-finals	8	3	1	4	13	15	−2	37.50
Total					31	12	8	11	45	43	+2	38.71

Last updated: 28 October 2017
Source: Competitions

=== Malaysia Super League ===
==== Table ====
Pos	Team	Pld	W	D	L	GF	GA	GD	Pts
4	Kedah (Note: Kedah as 2017 Malaysia FA Cup winners not eligible for AFC competition spots as they failed granted AFC club license.)	22	9	8	5	45	33	+12	35
5	Perak	22	9	7	6	30	31	−1	34
6	Selangor	22	9	6	7	32	28	+4	33
7	PKNS	22	6	7	9	33	38	−5	25
8	Melaka United	22	6	6	10	33	46	−13	24

Source: FAM, FMLLP
Rules for classification: 1) Points; 2) Goal difference; 3) Number of goals scored.

==== Results summary ====
Overall								Home						Away					
Pld	W	D	L	GF	GA	GD	Pts	W	D	L	GF	GA	GD	W	D	L	GF	GA	GD
22	9	6	7	32	28	+4	33	6	2	3	17	12	+5	3	4	4	15	16	−1

Source: Super League fixtures and results

==== Results by matchday ====
Round	1	2	3	4	5	6	7	8	9	10	11	12	13	14	15	16	17	18	19	20	21	22
Ground	H	H	A	A	H	A	H	H	H	A	A	A	H	H	A	A	H	A	H	H	A	A
Result	W	D	L	D	W	W	D	L	W	D	L	D	L	W	W	D	W	L	W	L	L	W
Position	1	3	5	8	4	3	3	5	4	4	5	4	5	5	4	5	4	5	5	5	6	6

Source: Super League fixtures and results
A = Away; H = Home; W = Win; D = Draw; L = Loss

==== Matches ====
The league fixtures were announced on 30 December 2016.

Win Draw Loss

21 January 2017 1	Selangor	2–0	Penang	Selayang, Selangor
21:00 UTC+08:00	Adam 35' (yellow card) 71'; Ukah (yellow card) 39'; Forkey Doe 45'; Halim (yellow card) 56'; Raimi (yellow card) 77'; Kannan (yellow card) 89'	Report	Diogo (yellow card) 42'; Zulkhairi (yellow card) 82'	Stadium: Majlis Perbandaran Selayang Stadium; Attendance: 3,076; Referee: Fitri Maskon

27 January 2017 2	Selangor	1–1	Melaka United	Selayang, Selangor
21:00 UTC+08:00	Adam (yellow card) 52'; Ukah (yellow card) 64'; Saiful (yellow card) 68'; Astafei 81'	Report	Khairu 69'	Stadium: Majlis Perbandaran Selayang Stadium; Attendance: 5,777; Referee: Nazmi Nasaruddin

4 February 2017 3	PKNS	5–3	Selangor	Shah Alam, Selangor
16:45 UTC+08:00	Wleh 20', 43', 58'; Safee 25' (yellow card) 37'; Hadwa (yellow card) 38' (goal) 47'; Haikal (yellow card) 45+2'	Report	Syahmi 1'; Forkey Doe 28', 55'; Raimi (yellow card) 37' (yellow-red card) 71'; Saiful (yellow card) 69'	Stadium: Shah Alam Stadium; Attendance: 6,113; Referee: Fairuzi Mat Desa

11 February 2017 4	Johor Darul Ta'zim	0–0	Selangor	Johor Bahru, Johor
21:00 UTC+08:00	Safawi (yellow card) 73'	Report	Razman (yellow card) 37'; Astafei (yellow card) 50'; Ukah (yellow card) 60'; Adam (yellow card) 90+2'	Stadium: Tan Sri Dato' Haji Hassan Yunos Stadium; Attendance: 19,822; Referee: Zohri Tajuddin

17 February 2017 5	Selangor	3–1	FELDA United	Selayang, Selangor
21:00 UTC+08:00	Astafei 29'; Saiful (yellow card) 39'; Raimi 43'; Mineiro 45+1'	Report	Hadin (yellow card) 17'; Aizulridzwan (yellow card) 45'; Lucas 84'	Stadium: Majlis Perbandaran Selayang Stadium; Attendance: 1,819; Referee: Nazmi Nasaruddin

25 February 2017 6	Kelantan	0–2	Selangor	Kota Bharu, Kelantan
21:00 UTC+08:00		Report	Mineiro 4', 63'; Syahmi (yellow card) 19'; Adam (yellow card) 44'	Stadium: Sultan Muhammad IV Stadium; Attendance: 2,503; Referee: Zulkifli Ahmad

1 March 2017 7	Selangor	1–1	Kedah	Selayang, Selangor
21:00 UTC+08:00	Rizal (yellow card) 59'; Mineiro 90+5'	Report	Syafiq (yellow card) 45+2'; Sandro 81'; Rizal (yellow card) 87'; Akram (yellow card) 90+4'	Stadium: Majlis Perbandaran Selayang Stadium; Attendance: 8,315; Referee: Zohri Tajuddin

4 March 2017 8	Selangor	0–1	Perak	Selayang, Selangor
21:00 UTC+08:00	Mineiro (yellow card) 24'; Ukah (yellow card) 45+2' (yellow-red card) 65'	Report	Zaquan 66' (pen.); Nasir (yellow card) 87'	Stadium: Majlis Perbandaran Selayang Stadium; Attendance: 9,000; Referee: Nagor Amir Noor Mohamed

8 April 2017 9	Selangor	2–1	Sarawak	Selayang, Selangor
21:00 UTC+08:00	Astafei 22'; Halim (yellow card) 26'; Forkey Doe 49'	Report	Roskam 83'; Shamie (yellow card) 85'	Stadium: Majlis Perbandaran Selayang Stadium; Attendance: 2,928; Referee: Samsudin Ibrahim

15 April 2017 10	Pahang	2–2	Selangor	Kuantan, Pahang
21:00 UTC+08:00	Davies 11'; Faisal (yellow card) 64' (goal) 88'	Report	Mineiro 6'; Forkey Doe 66' (pen.); Khairulazhan (yellow card) 85'; Razman (yellow card) 90+2'	Stadium: Darul Makmur Stadium; Attendance: 12,847; Referee: Fitri Maskon

26 April 2017 11	T–Team	1–0	Selangor	Kuala Terengganu, Terengganu
21:00 UTC+08:00	Fauzi 89'	Report		Stadium: Sultan Ismail Nasiruddin Shah Stadium; Attendance: 1,723; Referee: Fitri Maskon

9 May 2017 12	Sarawak	1–1	Selangor	Kuching, Sarawak
20:15 UTC+08:00	Roskam 34'	Report	Rizal 44'	Stadium: Sarawak State Stadium; Attendance: 2,185; Referee: Khirulazuan Kidam

24 May 2017 13	Selangor	0–2	Pahang	Selayang, Selangor
21:00 UTC+08:00	Amri (yellow card) 50'; Andik (yellow card) 54'; Halim (red card) 87'	Report	Alves 74', 83'	Stadium: Majlis Perbandaran Selayang Stadium; Attendance: 9,756; Referee: Nazmi Nasaruddin

1 July 2017 14	Selangor	4–2	T–Team	Selayang, Selangor
21:00 UTC+08:00	Syahmi 53', 85'; Forkey Doe (yellow card) 40' (goal) 55'; Rufino 82'; Ukah (yellow card) 88'	Report	Sharofetdinov 72'; N'Djeng 88' (pen.)	Stadium: Majlis Perbandaran Selayang Stadium; Attendance: 2,285; Referee: Amirul Izwan Yaacob

11 July 2017 15	Perak	0–1	Selangor	Ipoh, Perak
21:00 UTC+08:00	Hafiz (yellow card) 12'; Thiago (yellow card) 88'	Report	Saiful (yellow card) 15'; Razman (yellow card) 45+2'; Andik (red card) 57'; Forkey Doe 62' (yellow card) 63'; Namathevan (yellow card) 66'; Amri (yellow card) 72'; Ukah (yellow card) 76'; Raimi (yellow card) 79'; Rufino (yellow card) 81'; Norazlan (yellow card) 90+3'	Stadium: Perak Stadium; Attendance: 7,090; Referee: Nafeez Abd Wahab

15 July 2017 16	Kedah	1–1	Selangor	Alor Setar, Kedah
21:00 UTC+08:00	Ilsø 30'; Syazwan (yellow card) 86'; Baddrol (yellow card) 89'	Report	Veenod 17'; Namathevan (yellow card) 61'; Norazlan (yellow card) 88'	Stadium: Darulaman Stadium; Attendance: 18,000; Referee: Fitri Maskon

22 July 2017 17	Selangor	1–0	Kelantan	Selayang, Selangor
21:00 UTC+08:00	Amri 20'; Raimi (yellow card) 65'; Rizal (yellow card) 89'; Bunyamin (yellow card) 90+3'	Report	Fadhilah (yellow card) 67'; Abou Bakr (yellow card) 89'	Stadium: Majlis Perbandaran Selayang Stadium; Attendance: 7,837; Referee: Khirulazuan Kidam

26 July 2017 18	FELDA United	3–1	Selangor	Jengka, Pahang
21:00 UTC+08:00	Thiago 40'; Ifedayo 44'; Alif (yellow card) 58'; Shukor 76'; Ferns (yellow card) 90+3'	Report	Forkey Doe 45+2'	Stadium: Tun Abdul Razak Stadium; Attendance: 2,469; Referee: Zulkarnain Zakaria

5 August 2017 19	Selangor	2–1	Johor Darul Ta'zim	Selayang, Selangor
21:00 UTC+08:00	Ukah (yellow card) 26'; Amri 59'; Andik 77'	Report	Afiq (yellow card) 34'; Insa 39'; Nazmi (yellow card) 82'	Stadium: Majlis Perbandaran Selayang Stadium; Attendance: 11,257; Referee: Khirulazuan Kidam

20 September 2017 20	Selangor	1–2	PKNS	Selayang, Selangor
21:00 UTC+08:00	Rufino 34'; Amri (yellow card) 50'	Report	Shahrul 25'; Wleh 64'; Nizam (yellow card) 87'; Azmizi (yellow card) 90+2'	Stadium: Majlis Perbandaran Selayang Stadium; Attendance: 847; Referee: Zamzaidi Katimin

27 September 2017 21	Melaka United	2–1	Selangor	Krubong, Malacca
21:00 UTC+08:00	Mecinović 6'; Šimić 42'; Swirad (yellow card) 76'; Ezrie (yellow card) 82'	Report	Bunyamin (yellow card) 39'; Rufino 57'; Syahmi (yellow card) 84'	Stadium: Hang Jebat Stadium; Attendance: 2,059; Referee: Fairuzi Mat Desa

28 October 2017 22	Penang	1–3	Selangor	Seberang Perai, Penang
21:00 UTC+08:00	Jafri 48'	Report	Andik 25'; Rufino 50', 62'; Tamil (yellow card) 74'; Kannan (yellow card) 90+2'	Stadium: Penang State Stadium; Attendance: 728; Referee: Fitri Maskon

==== Results overview ====
Win Draw Loss

Team	Home score	Away score	Double
FELDA United	3–1	1–3	4–4
Johor Darul Ta'zim	2–1	0–0	2–1
Kedah	1–1	1–1	2–2
Kelantan	1–0	2–0	3–0
Melaka United	1–1	1–2	2–3
Pahang	0–2	2–2	2–4
Penang	2–0	3–1	5–1
Perak	0–1	1–0	1–1
PKNS	1–2	3–5	4–7
Sarawak	2–1	1–1	3–2
T–Team	4–2	0–1	4–3

=== FA Cup ===
14 February 2017 Second round	Selangor	0–0 (a.e.t.) (3–4 p)	Negeri Sembilan	Selayang, Selangor
21:00 UTC+08:00	Astafei (yellow card) 30'	Report	Hariri (yellow card) 24'; Vidić (yellow card) 79'; Nasriq (yellow card) 80'	Stadium: Majlis Perbandaran Selayang Stadium; Attendance: 4,704; Referee: S. Sittharanjanan
	Penalties
	Mineiro (penalty scored); Razman (penalty scored); Forkey Doe (penalty scored); Halim (penalty missed); Ukah (penalty missed)		Hazrul (penalty missed); Lee (penalty scored); Vidić (penalty scored); Faizal (penalty scored); Suzuki (penalty scored)

=== Malaysia Cup ===
Selangor joined the competition in the group stage.

==== Group stage ====
Pos	Team	Pld	W	D	L	GF	GA	GD	Pts	Qualification	JDT	SGR	SWK	TRG
1	Johor Darul Ta'zim	6	4	1	1	16	4	+12	13	Advance to knockout phase	—	3–1	4–0	5–0
2	Selangor	6	3	1	2	11	11	0	10	Advance to knockout phase	3–2	—	1–2	1–1
3	Sarawak	6	1	2	3	6	12	−6	5		0–2	1–2	—	0–0
4	Terengganu	6	0	4	2	6	12	−6	4		0–0	2–3	3–3	—

Updated to match(es) played on 9 September 2017. Source: FAM FMLLP

4 July 2017 1	Selangor	1–1	Terengganu	Selayang, Selangor
21:00 UTC+8	Rufino 43'; Saiful (yellow card) 56'	Report	Partiban (yellow card) 24'; Lázaro (yellow card) 57'; Issey 64' (pen.)	Stadium: Majlis Perbandaran Selayang Stadium; Attendance: 2,951; Referee: Khirulazuan Kidam

8 July 2017 2	Sarawak	1–2	Selangor	Kuching, Sarawak
20:15 UTC+8	Shreen 82'	Report	Forkey Doe 38' (yellow card) 41'; Dzulazlan 65' (o.g.); Adam (yellow card) 88'	Stadium: Sarawak State Stadium; Attendance: 2,000; Referee: Fitri Maskon

18 July 2017 3	Selangor	3–2	Johor Darul Ta'zim	Selayang, Selangor
21:00 UTC+8	Fairuz 33'; Amri 35', 90' (pen.)	Report	Nazmi (yellow card) 42'; Hazwan 56'; Darren 69'; Aidil (yellow card) 89'; Marcos António (yellow card) 90'	Stadium: Majlis Perbandaran Selayang Stadium; Attendance: 10,219; Referee: Zohri Tajuddin

29 July 2017 4	Terengganu	2–3	Selangor	Kuala Terengganu, Terengganu
21:00 UTC+8	Faruqi 24'; Latiff (yellow card) 34'; Tchétché 78'	Report	Forkey Doe 51'; Syahmi 56'; Rufino 90+3'	Stadium: Sultan Ismail Nasiruddin Shah Stadium; Attendance: 7,150; Referee: Nagor Amir Noor Mohamed

2 August 2017 5	Selangor	1–2	Sarawak	Selayang, Selangor
21:00 UTC+8	Fitri (yellow card) 22'; Ukah 39'	Report	Roskam 52'; Mazwandi (yellow card) 53'; Raičković 65'	Stadium: Majlis Perbandaran Selayang Stadium; Attendance: 1,721; Referee: Amirul Izwan Yaacob

9 September 2017 6	Johor Darul Ta'zim	3–1	Selangor	Johor Bahru, Johor
21:00 UTC+8	Ghaddar 17', 75'; Hasbullah (yellow card) 24'; Gary 30' (yellow card) 60'	Report	Rufino 28'; Razman (yellow card) 31'; Amri (yellow card) 59'; Ukah (yellow card) 63'	Stadium: Larkin Stadium; Attendance: 15,930; Referee: Zohri Tajuddin

==== Quarter-finals ====
15 September 2017 First leg	Selangor	2–3	Kedah	Selayang, Selangor
21:00 UTC+8	Razman (yellow card) 13'; Rufino 53', 71'; Amri (yellow card) 74'; Ukah (yellow card) 78'	Report	Ilsø 7', 15' (yellow card) 73'; Amirul (yellow card) 12'; Syazwan 68'; Sandro (yellow card) 78'	Stadium: Majlis Perbandaran Selayang Stadium; Attendance: 7,282; Referee: Nazmi Nasaruddin

24 September 2017 Second leg	Kedah	1–0 (4–2 agg.)	Selangor	Alor Setar, Kedah
21:00 UTC+8	Rizal (yellow card) 2'; Sandro 30' (pen.); Helmi (yellow card) 45+1'; Liridon (yellow card) 90+3'	Report	Raimi (yellow card) 43'; Rufino (yellow card) 56'; Halim (yellow card) 77'	Stadium: Darulaman Stadium; Attendance: 23,000; Referee: Nagor Amir Noor Mohamed

== Statistics ==
=== Squad statistics ===
As of 28 October 2017

Appearances (Apps.) numbers are for appearances in competitive games only including sub appearances.
\ Red card numbers denote: Numbers in parentheses represent red cards overturned for wrongful dismissal.

No.	Nat.	Player	Pos.	Super League				FA Cup				Malaysia Cup				Total			
No.	Nat.	Player	Pos.	Apps	Goal	Yellow card	Red card	Apps	Goal	Yellow card	Red card	Apps	Goal	Yellow card	Red card	Apps	Goal	Yellow card	Red card
1	(Malaysia)	Khairulazhan	GK	14		1		1				3				18		1	
2	(Malaysia)	A. Namathevan	DF	8		2						6				14		2	
3	(Malaysia)	K. Kannan	DF	14		2		1				5				20		2	
4	(Malaysia)	Halim Zainal	MF	18		2	1	1				4		1		23		3	1
5	(Malaysia)	K. Satish	MF	3								1				4			
6	(Malaysia)	Amirul Ashraf	DF	1												1			
7	(Indonesia)	Andik Vermansyah	MF	8	2	1	1					8				16	2	1	1
8	(Malaysia)	Saiful Ridzuwan	MF	20		4		1				8		1		29		5	
9	(Malaysia)	Adam Nor Azlin	FW	17	1	4		1				6		1		24	1	5	
10	(Liberia)	Forkey Doe	FW	18	8	2		1				7	2	1		26	10	3	
11	(Malaysia)	Faizzudin Abidin	MF	1								1				2			
12	(Malaysia)	Bunyamin Umar	DF	10		2						1				11		2	
13	(Malaysia)	Razman Roslan	DF	19		3		1				6		2		26		5	
14	(Malaysia)	Badrul Amin	FW																
15	(Malaysia)	Raimi Mohd Nor	DF	15	1	3	1	1				6		1		22	1	4	1
16	(Malaysia)	K. Sarkunan	MF	1												1			
17	(Malaysia)	Rizal Fahmi	DF	12	1	2		1				3				16	1	2	
18	(Nigeria)	Ugo Ukah	DF	18		6	1	1				7	1	2		26	1	8	1
19	(Malaysia)	Afiq Azmi	FW	4												4			
20	(Malaysia)	Syahmi Safari	MF	19	3	2		1				6	1			26	4	2	
21	(Malaysia)	Norazlan Razali	GK	7		2						4				11		2	
22	(Malaysia)	Zarif Irfan	GK	1								1				2			
23	(Malaysia)	S. Veenod	MF	20	1			1				7				28	1		
24	(Malaysia)	Fitri Shazwan	MF	11								3		1		14		1	
26	(Malaysia)	Fairuz Abdul Aziz	DF	4								3	1			7	1		
27	(Malaysia)	Nurshamil	FW	7								2				9			
28	(Timor-Leste)	Juliano Mineiro †	MF	11	5	1		1								12	5	1	
29	(Malaysia)	Amri Yahyah	FW	8	2	3						7	2	2		15	4	5	
30	(Romania)	Victoraș Astafei †	MF	11	3	1		1		1						12	3	2	
30	(Spain)	Rufino Segovia	FW	6	5	1						6	5	1		12	10	2	
33	(Malaysia)	M. Tamil Maran	DF	1		1										1		1	
Own goals					0				0				1				1		
Totals					32	45	4		0	1	0		13	13	0		45	59	4

† Player left the club during the season.

=== Goalscorers ===
Includes all competitive matches.

As of match played 28 October 2017

Rank	Pos.	No.	Player	Super League	FA Cup	Malaysia Cup	Total
1	FW	10	(Liberia) Forkey Doe	8	0	2	10
1	MF	30	(Spain) Rufino Segovia	5	0	5	10
3	MF	28	(Timor-Leste) Juliano Mineiro †	5	0	0	5
4	MF	20	(Malaysia) Syahmi Safari	3	0	1	4
4	FW	29	(Malaysia) Amri Yahyah	2	0	2	4
6	MF	30	(Romania) Victoraș Astafei †	3	0	0	3
7	MF	7	(Indonesia) Andik Vermansyah	2	0	0	2
8	FW	9	(Malaysia) Adam Nor Azlin	1	0	0	1
8	DF	15	(Malaysia) Raimi Mohd Nor	1	0	0	1
8	DF	17	(Malaysia) Rizal Fahmi	1	0	0	1
8	DF	18	(Nigeria) Ugo Ukah	0	0	1	1
8	MF	23	(Malaysia) S. Veenod	1	0	0	1
8	DF	26	(Malaysia) Fairuz Abdul Aziz	0	0	1	1
Own Goals				0	0	1	1
TOTALS				32	0	13	45
Own Goals Conceded
TBD	TBD	TBD	To be Determined	0	0	0	0
TOTALS				0	0	0	0

† Player left the club during the season.

=== Clean sheets ===
Rnk	No.	Player	Super League	FA Cup	Malaysia Cup	Total
1	1	(Malaysia) Khairulazhan	3	1	0	4
2	21	(Malaysia) Norazlan Razali	1	0	0	1
2	22	(Malaysia) Zarif Irfan	1	0	0	1
TOTALS			5	1	0	6

=== Disciplinary record ===
As of match played 28 October 2017

Rank	No.	Pos.	Name	Super League			FA Cup			Malaysia Cup			Total		
Rank	No.	Pos.	Name	Yellow card	(yellow card) (yellow-red card)	Red card	Yellow card	(yellow card) (yellow-red card)	Red card	Yellow card	(yellow card) (yellow-red card)	Red card	Yellow card	(yellow card) (yellow-red card)	Red card
1	18	DF	(Nigeria) Ugo Ukah	6	1	-	-	-	-	2	-	-	8	1	-
2	8	MF	(Malaysia) Saiful Ridzuwan	4	-	-	-	-	-	1	-	-	5	-	-
2	9	FW	(Malaysia) Adam Nor Azlin	4	-	-	-	-	-	1	-	-	5	-	-
2	13	DF	(Malaysia) Razman Roslan	3	-	-	-	-	-	2	-	-	5	-	-
2	29	FW	(Malaysia) Amri Yahyah	3	-	-	-	-	-	2	-	-	5	-	-
6	15	DF	(Malaysia) Raimi Mohd Nor	3	1	-	-	-	-	1	-	-	4	1	-
7	4	MF	(Malaysia) Halim Zainal	2	-	1	-	-	-	1	-	-	3	-	1
7	10	FW	(Liberia) Forkey Doe	2	-	-	-	-	-	1	-	-	3	-	-
9	2	DF	(Malaysia) A. Namathevan	2	-	-	-	-	-	-	-	-	2	-	-
9	3	DF	(Malaysia) K. Kannan	2	-	-	-	-	-	-	-	-	2	-	-
9	12	DF	(Malaysia) Bunyamin Umar	2	-	-	-	-	-	-	-	-	2	-	-
9	17	DF	(Malaysia) Rizal Fahmi	2	-	-	-	-	-	-	-	-	2	-	-
9	20	MF	(Malaysia) Syahmi Safari	2	-	-	-	-	-	-	-	-	2	-	-
9	21	GK	(Malaysia) Norazlan Razali	2	-	-	-	-	-	-	-	-	2	-	-
9	30	MF	(Romania) Victoraș Astafei †	1	-	-	1	-	-	-	-	-	2	-	-
9	30	FW	(Spain) Rufino Segovia	1	-	-	-	-	-	1	-	-	2	-	-
17	1	GK	(Malaysia) Khairulazhan	1	-	-	-	-	-	-	-	-	1	-	-
17	7	MF	(Indonesia) Andik Vermansyah	1	-	1	-	-	-	-	-	-	1	-	1
17	24	MF	(Malaysia) Fitri Shazwan	-	-	-	-	-	-	1	-	-	1	-	-
17	28	MF	(Timor-Leste) Juliano Mineiro †	1	-	-	-	-	-	-	-	-	1	-	-
17	33	DF	(Malaysia) Tamil Maran	1	-	-	-	-	-	-	-	-	1	-	-
Total				45	2	2	1	0	0	13	0	0	59	2	2

† Player left the club during the season.
