= 2013 Pahang FA season =

Pahang
2013 season
- President: Tengku Abdul Rahman
- Manager: Che Nasir Salleh
- Head Coach: Dollah Salleh
- Malaysia Super League: 5th
- FA Cup: Semi-finals
- Malaysia Cup: Winner
- Top goalscorer: League: Mohd Fauzi Roslan (8); All: Matías Conti (16)
- Highest home attendance: 40,000 vs Sarawak (19 October 2013)
- Lowest home attendance: 10,000 vs Tentera Darat (26 February 2013)
- Average home league attendance: 25,997
Home colours	Away colours

The 2013 season was Pahang's 23rd consecutive season in the top flight of Malaysian football. Pahang's victory in the 2013 Malaysia Cup for the third time in their history, last time they won are 21 years ago.

== Coaching staff ==
Position	Staff
Manager	(Malaysia) Dato' Che Nasir B Salleh
Assistant manager	(Malaysia) Zainal Abidin Hassan
Head coach	(Malaysia) Dollah Salleh
Assistant coach	(Malaysia) Ahmad Shaharuddin Rosdi
Goalkeeper coach	(Malaysia) Mudzar Mohamad
First-team fitness coaches	(Malaysia) Rahim Kadir Ku Jambu
Physiotherapist	(Malaysia) Mohd Suhaimi Ramli
Physiotherapist	(Malaysia) Adam Zuhairy
Kit man/Equipment	(Malaysia) Abdul Razak B Akil
Reserve team manager	(Malaysia) Datuk Mohd Tajuddin Abdullah
Reserve Team Head Coach	(Malaysia) Azaruddin Aziz
Reserve Team Assistant Coach	(Malaysia) Fahim Kow Abdullah
Reserve Team Goalkeeping Coach	(Malaysia) Syed Nasir Akil
Reserve Team Physiotherapist	(Malaysia) Hafizan Abdul Hamit

=== Other information ===
Chairman	(Malaysia) Y.A.M. Tengku Muda Pahang Tengku Abdul Rahman
General Secretary	(Malaysia) Fuzzemi Ibrahim
Ground (capacity and dimensions)	Darulmakmur Stadium (41,837 / 103x67 metres)
Training ground	Taman Gelora Ground

== Players ==
=== First-team squad ===
No.	Name	Nationality	Position
Goalkeepers
1	Khairulazhan Khalid	(Malaysia)	GK
22	Rosfaizul Azuar Ali	(Malaysia)	GK
23	Mohd Nasril Nourdin	(Malaysia)	GK
Defenders
2	Jalaluddin Jaafar (captain)	(Malaysia)	RB
3	Mohd Saiful Nizam Miswan	(Malaysia)	CB
4	Damion Stewart	(Jamaica)	CB
6	Mohd Hazri Rozali	(Malaysia)	RB
13	Mohd Razman Roslan	(Malaysia)	CB
14	Mohd Faisal Mohd Rosli	(Malaysia)	LB
17	Mohd Zaiza Zainal Abidin|	(Malaysia)	CB
18	Muhammad Syawal Norsam	(Malaysia)	CB
20	Mohd Shahrizan Salleh	(Malaysia)	LB
Midfielders
5	Mohd Amirul Hadi Zainal	(Malaysia)	CM
7	R. Surendran	(Malaysia)	RW
8	Azidan Sarudin	(Malaysia)	CM
10	Abdul Malik Mat Ariff	(Malaysia)	LW
11	Mohd Faizol Hussien	(Malaysia)	CM
15	Mohd Hazuan Mohd Daud	(Malaysia)	RW
21	Mohd Hafiz Kamal	(Malaysia)	CM
24	R.Gopinathan	(Malaysia)	LW
Forwards
9	Matías Conti	(Argentina)	ST
12	Mohd Azamuddin Md Akil	(Malaysia)	ST
19	Mohd Fauzi Roslan	(Malaysia)	ST
25	Mohd Shafei Zahari	(Malaysia)	ST

=== Reserve squad ===
Note: Flags indicate national team as defined under FIFA eligibility rules; some limited exceptions apply. Players may hold more than one non-FIFA nationality.

No.	Pos.	Nation	Player
1	GK	(Malaysia) MAS	Muhammad Saufi Mohamad
2	DF	(Malaysia) MAS	Muhammad Zakwan Harun
3	MF	(Malaysia) MAS	Mohd Nur Raimin Abd Rani
4	DF	(Malaysia) MAS	Iskandar Zulkarnaen Ibrahim
5	DF	(Malaysia) MAS	Mohd Yusrizal Che Usop
6	MF	(Malaysia) MAS	Shahrul Azwan Ariff
7	DF	(Malaysia) MAS	Mohamad Firdaus Anuar
8	MF	(Malaysia) MAS	Mohamad Firdaus Mat Nasir
9	FW	(Malaysia) MAS	Mohd Shafei Zahari
10	FW	(Malaysia) MAS	Muhammad Saifulrisal
11	MF	(Malaysia) MAS	Mohd Sharul Aizad Zukufli
12	DF	(Malaysia) MAS	Muhammad Ilham Yusof
13	MF	(Malaysia) MAS	Mohd Shafizi Mohd Zain

No.	Pos.	Nation	Player
14	MF	(Malaysia) MAS	Muhammad Nur Azam Abdul Azih
15	MF	(Malaysia) MAS	Md Rizua Shafiqi Kamarulzaman
16	FW	(Malaysia) MAS	Muhamad Amirul Kasmuri
17	FW	(Malaysia) MAS	Muhamad Aliff Amin Basri
18	MF	(Malaysia) MAS	Ikmal Hakim Hamizat
19	DF	(Malaysia) MAS	Mohamad Amin Mozri
20	FW	(Malaysia) MAS	Mohd Faizal Abdul Rani
21	DF	(Malaysia) MAS	Mohd Hilmi Husaini Asmadii
22	GK	(Malaysia) MAS	Khairul Nidzam Md Noor
23	DF	(Malaysia) MAS	Mohd Azlye Hafizee Mohd Yatim
24	DF	(Malaysia) MAS	Muhamad Nur Zhafri Zaini
25	GK	(Malaysia) MAS	Mohamad Aliff Md Sadali

== Transfers ==
In

Note: Flags indicate national team as defined under FIFA eligibility rules; some limited exceptions apply. Players may hold more than one non-FIFA nationality.

No.	Pos.	Nation	Player
—	GK	(Malaysia) MAS	Mohd Nasril Nourdin (from Perak FA)
—	DF	(Malaysia) MAS	Mohd Razman Roslan (from Selangor FA)
—	MF	(Malaysia) MAS	Azidan Sarudin (from Selangor FA)
—	MF	(Malaysia) MAS	Mohd Amirul Hadi Zainal (from Selangor FA)
—	GK	(Malaysia) MAS	Khairulazhan Khalid (from Shahzan Muda FC)

No.	Pos.	Nation	Player
—	DF	(Malaysia) MAS	Faisal Rosli (from Shahzan Muda FC)
—	FW	(North Macedonia) MKD	Nikolce Klečkarovski (from SHB Đà Nẵng F.C.)
—	FW	(Morocco) MAR	Mohamed Borji (from Difaa El Jadida)
—	GK	(Argentina) ARG	Matías Conti (from Tristán Suárez)
—	DF	(Jamaica) JAM	Damion Stewart (from Notts County)

Out

Note: Flags indicate national team as defined under FIFA eligibility rules; some limited exceptions apply. Players may hold more than one non-FIFA nationality.

No.	Pos.	Nation	Player
4	DF	(Malaysia) MAS	Mohd Fadzirul Zakaria (to be released)
5	MF	(Malaysia) MAS	Khairan Eroza Razali (to Penang FA)
8	DF	(Malaysia) MAS	Khairul Azman B Awang Long (Kuantan FA)
9	MF	(Russia) RUS	Boris Kochkin (to be released)
10	FW	(Brazil) BRA	Maycon Carvalho Inez (to be released)
13	DF	(Malaysia) MAS	Wan Mohd Azwari Wan Nor (to Sabah FA)
14	DF	(Malaysia) MAS	Abdul Wafiy Abdul Ghafar (to Shahzan Muda FC)

No.	Pos.	Nation	Player
16	DF	(Malaysia) MAS	Amirrullah Abd Razab (to Kuantan FA)
22	GK	(Malaysia) MAS	Wan Azraei Wan Teh (to Terengganu FA)
23	FW	(Malaysia) MAS	Mohd Kamal Rodiarjat Mohd Ali (to Kuantan FA)
25	GK	(Malaysia) MAS	Mohd Hafiz Nasruddin (to be released)
—	FW	(North Macedonia) MKD	Nikolce Klečkarovski (to be released)
—	FW	(Morocco) MAR	Mohamed Borji (to be released)

For recent transfers, see List of Malaysian football transfers 2012

== Competitions ==
=== Competition record ===
Competition	Record							
Competition	G	W	D	L	GF	GA	GD	Win %
2013 Malaysia Super League	22	10	5	7	36	32	+4	45.45
2013 Malaysia FA Cup	4	3	1	0	14	5	+9	75.00
2013 Malaysia Cup	11	6	3	2	21	16	+5	54.55
Total	37	19	9	9	71	53	+18	51.35

=== 2013 Malaysia Cup ===
The Final will be played on 3 Nov 2013 at Shah Alam Stadium, Shah Alam.

3 November 2013
20:45 UTC+8

Kelantan FA	0–1	Pahang FA
		Matías Conti 59'

Shah Alam Stadium, Shah Alam, Selangor
Attendance: 80,119
Referee: Nagor Amir Noor Mohamed (Kuala Lumpur)

=== Malaysia Super League ===
Pos	Team	Pld	W	D	L	GF	GA	GD	Pts	Qualification or relegation
3	Johor Darul Takzim	22	11	7	4	32	26	+6	40	
4	Kelantan	22	10	6	6	32	20	+12	36	2014 AFC Cup group stage (Note: Qualified as 2013 Piala FA winners)
5	Pahang	22	10	5	7	36	32	+4	35	
6	ATM	22	10	4	8	35	25	+10	34	
7	Perak	22	8	5	9	23	27	−4	29	

Source: RSSSF
Rules for classification: 1) points; 2) goal difference; 3) number of goals scored

=== Malaysia FA Cup ===
1st Round
(Selangor) PKNS	1
(Singapore) LionsXII	0
Sarawak	3
Malacca	0
(Cambodia) Preah Khan	1
(Penang) PBAPP	5
Kuala Lumpur	0
(Kuala Lumpur) Pos Malaysia	5
(Selangor) UiTM	0
Negeri Sembilan	2
(Malaysia) PDRM	1
Penang	2
(Putrajaya) SPA	1
Terengganu	3
Kedah	3
(Negeri Sembilan) NS Betaria	0
Johor Darul Takzim	1
Perak	0
Sabah	2
(Kuala Lumpur) FELDA United	1
Selangor	2(3)
ATM	2(2)
Johor	2
Pahang	3
(Pahang) Shahzan Muda	0
Tentera Darat	2
(Terengganu) T-Team	3
Perlis	2

2nd Round
Kelantan	4
(Selangor) PKNS	2
Sarawak	2
(Penang) PBAPP	0
(Kuala Lumpur) Pos Malaysia	0
Negeri Sembilan	2
Penang	0
Terengganu	3
Kedah	2(4)
Johor Darul Takzim	2(5)
Sabah	0
Selangor	3
Pahang	7
Tentera Darat	1
(Terengganu) T-Team	0
(Kuala Lumpur) Sime Darby	1

Quarter-finals
Kelantan	2	2	4
Sarawak	1	0	1
Negeri Sembilan	1	0	1
Terengganu	3	3	6
Johor Darul Takzim	1	2	3(4)
Selangor	2	1	3(2)
Pahang	0	2	2
(Kuala Lumpur) Sime Darby	0	0	0

Semi-finals
Kelantan	4	2	6
Terengganu	1	4	5
Johor Darul Takzim (a)	1	1	2
Pahang	0	2	2

Final
Kelantan	1
Johor Darul Takzim	0

=== Malaysia Cup ===
==== Group stage ====
Team	Pld	W	D	L	GF	GA	GD	Pts
Kelantan FA (A)	6	3	2	1	13	6	+7	11
Pahang FA (A)	6	2	2	2	11	11	0	8
Negeri Sembilan FA	6	2	2	2	11	13	−2	8
Terengganu FA	6	1	2	3	6	11	−5	5

(A) Advance to the 2013 Piala Malaysia quarter finals

==== Knockout phase ====
Quarterfinals
D2	(Singapore) LionsXII	1	1	2
A1	ATM FA	0	4	4
C1	Kelantan FA	2	6	8
B2	Johor Darul Takzim	4	1	5
C2	Pahang FA	3	2	5
B1	(Selangor) PKNS FC	2	1	3
A2	(Kuala Lumpur) Sime Darby FC	0	1	1
D1	Sarawak FA	0	3	3

Semifinals
A1	ATM FA	1	2	3
C1	Kelantan FA	2	2	4
C2	Pahang FA	3	1	4
D1	Sarawak FA	1	1	2

Final
C1	Kelantan FA	0
C2	Pahang FA	1
