= Farizal Harun =

Malaysian footballer

Personal information
- Full name: Mohd Farizal bin Harun
- Date of birth: 2 February 1986 (age 40)
- Place of birth: Negeri Sembilan, Malaysia
- Height: 1.75 m (5 ft 9 in)
- Position: Goalkeeper

Youth career
- 2005–2006: Negeri Sembilan U21

Senior career*
Years	Team	Apps	(Gls)
2007–2011	Negeri Sembilan	45	(0)
2012–2013	ATM	48	(0)
2014–2018	Felda United	66	(0)
2018–2020	Selangor	9	(0)
2021	Kelantan	5	(0)
2022	Harini		
- * Club domestic league appearances and goals

Mohd Farizal bin Harun (born 2 February 1986) is a Malaysian professional footballer who plays as a goalkeeper.

== Club career ==
=== Negeri Sembilan ===
Farizal is a product of the Negeri Sembilan President Cup team.

He served mainly as a backup goalkeeper for Negeri Sembilan first team. At one time he is the third choice behind the likes of Malaysia international goalkeeper, Farizal Marlias and second choice Sani Anuar Kamsani.

=== ATM ===
After finding it hard to gain a regular game time, he decided to join big spending ATM in 2012 Malaysia Premier League. He helped the team win the league and finish runners-up in 2012 Malaysia Cup final against favourites Kelantan.

=== Felda United ===
==== 2014 season ====
In 2014, Farizal signed a contract with Felda United with some other big names such as Indra Putra, Shukor Adan and Shahrulnizam Mustapha. He performed well and helped the team to finished second in the league.

A positive season for Felda United when they defeated other Super League side before reaching FA Cup final against eventual winner, Pahang. In 2014 Malaysia Cup semi final first leg, he helped Felda United to win against, Johor Darul Ta'zim, the Malaysia Super League winners of the season in first leg. Where both team had to play in muddy pitch of Selayang Stadium. But once again, Felda United did not managed to secure away goals advantaged when Johor Darul Ta'zim won 3–1 in second leg match. Made its Farizal 6th consecutive semi final of Malaysia Cup. A record might be not achieved by other players.

==== 2015 season ====
The domestic league campaign seemed not to work with Farizal magic when Felda United finished 5th with 10 points behind Johor Darul Ta'zim and only 3 point gap with Selangor the runners up after initial runners up, Pahang deducted 6 points after failed to paid Mohamed Borji wages. Again, Farizal carved another record onto his footballing career when Felda United qualified to semi final Malaysia Cup but lost to Kedah. Make it 7th consecutive semi final in 6 years.

==== 2016 season ====
Farizal kept the most clean sheet of the league with six clean sheets. Alongside Hafizul Hakim, Khairul Fahmi and Izham Tarmizi, the two latter were regularly being called up to national team but not Farizal. The reason why local fans wondered why he didn't picked up though already had decent record in term of personal achievement.

Felda United did give tight challenge to Johor Darul Ta'zim when they managed to hold on top position for weeks before lack of experiences dealing with pressure cost them the league title that went to eventual champion, Johor Darul Ta'zim. Yet, he helped the team to secure play off slot for upcoming AFC Cup season their first ever Asian campaign since inception. After Johor Darul Ta'zim won the FA cup and the AFC cup slot awarded to Felda United after Johor Darul Ta'zim qualified by league position.

==== 2017 season ====
Farizal played in AFC Cup campaign for the first time of his career and Felda first ever taste of Asian club championship. But the team did not managed passed the group stage after finish bottom of the group. The 2017 season end up with flying colours for Felda United after finished third in the league and reached Malaysia cup semi final which is 7th semi final for Farizal, unfortunately for upcoming 2018 super league they relegated to the premier league after failed to meet the requirement needed to compete in Super league after going through privatisation. He also nominated in 3 best goalkeepers in Super league for Anugerah Bolasepak Kebangsaan but loss to Ifwat Akmal.

==== 2018 season ====
Farizal stayed with some other player such as Shukor Adan, Wan Zack Haikal, Thiago Augusto and Hadin Azman even after Felda demoted to premier league.

Farizal finally lifting his first silverware with Felda after they beating sarawak 3–1 in Kuching. which saw they become Liga Perdana Champion of the season with remaining 2 fixtures and 41 points, 10 point ahead of Felcra FC in 2nd spot.

During the Malaysia Cup Campaign, Felda were leading 2–0 to turn the 1-2 aggregate deficit in Kuala Terengganu. But home side equalise to make it 2-2. Felda managed to take the lead 3-2 and 10 minutes left to semi final but later The Turtles scored another two goals to won the 4–3. Most of the Terengganu goals came from bad defensive and goalkeeping errors by Felda.

Due to re-structure financial constraints, Felda need to cut their budget for upcoming season. Begin with coach B. Sathianathan who refuse to earn much lower wages, Farizal follow suit later by signing for Selangor. This is third team Farizal under tutelage of Bhaskaran Sathianathan after ATM and Felda United.

=== Selangor ===
On 12 December 2018, Selangor announced the signing of Farizal from FELDA United for a free transfer. He will join the squad along with new coach Selangor, B. Sathianathan, and other teammates K. Prabakaran and Azreen Zulkafali, who already join Selangor before him. He leaves Selangor at the end of 2020 Malaysia Super League season.

Season 2019, Farizal cause turmoil between him and the fans, especially after " K*p*l* B*t*h " incident which left fans anger during post game against Terengganu which saw Red Giant lost 0–1. Prior to that incident, Farizal did punched Mohammed Al Fateh, from PKNP. FAM punished him with 5 matches suspension and RM 5000 fined.

=== Kelantan ===
In 2021, Farizal joins Malaysia Premier League side Kelantan for the rest of the season .

Farizal stirred a controversy after not received salary promised by zamsaham, club owner.

It took year later to exposed zamsaham scheme after he illegally pumped funds from his investor to running the club without their consent. After some other players revealed they are not being paid accordingly. Thus, proved that Farizal allegations were right.

=== Harini KS ===
After becoming a free agent, Farizal signed with Malaysia M3 League side, Harini KS a team based in Kuala Selangor. It was previously known as Batu Tiga FC.

Farizal was signed alongside his former teammate in ATM, K Reuben for the 2022 season.

== International career ==
Farizal included in Malaysia U-20 squad that excelled in 2004 AFC Youth Championship when the team in charged under K. Rajagopal after sacked of Jorvan Vieira. The team were dismantled last minute by K. Rajagopal and Farizal amongst other new face selected after succeed in recent campaign with Negeri Sembilan during SUKMA 2004 where he helped the team win gold medal.

== Career statistics ==
=== Club ===
As of match played 19 May 2018

Appearances and goals by club, season and competition
Club	Season	League			Cup		League Cup		Continental		Total	
Club	Season	Division	Apps	Goals	Apps	Goals	Apps	Goals	Apps	Goals	Apps	Goals
Negeri Sembilan	2007–08	Malaysia Super League	0	0	0	0	0	0	0	0	0	0
Negeri Sembilan	2009	Malaysia Super League	0	0	0	0	0	0	0	0	0	0
Negeri Sembilan	2010	Malaysia Super League	0	0	0	0	0	0	0	0	0	0
Negeri Sembilan	2011	Malaysia Super League	12	0	0	0	0	0	0	0	0	0
Negeri Sembilan	Total		0	0	0	0	0	0	0	0	0	0
ATM	2012	Malaysia Premier League	4	0	0	0	0	0	0	0	0	0
ATM	2013	Malaysia Super League	0	0	0	0	0	0	0	0	0	0
ATM	Total		0	0	0	0	0	0	0	0	0	0
Felda United	2014	Malaysia Premier League	0	0	0	0	0	0	0	0	0	0
Felda United	2015	Malaysia Super League	0	0	0	0	0	0	0	0	0	0
Felda United	2016	Malaysia Super League	20	0	1	0	0	0	0	0	0	0
Felda United	2017	Malaysia Super League	22	0	1	0	8	0	5	0	36	0
Felda United	2018	Malaysia Premier League	17	0	4	0	0	0	–	–	21	0
Felda United	Total		0	0	0	0	0	0	0	0	0	0
Selangor	2019	Malaysia Super League	0	0	0	0	0	0	0	0	0	0
Selangor	Total		0	0	0	0	0	0	0	0	0	0
Career total			0	0	0	0	0	0	0	0	0	0

== Honours ==
=== Club ===
Felda United

- Malaysian Premier League: 2014 Runner-up
- Malaysia FA Cup: 2014 Runner-up
- Malaysian Super League: 2016 Runner-up
- Malaysian Super League: 2017 3rd Place
