= Khairulazhan Khalid =

Malaysian footballer

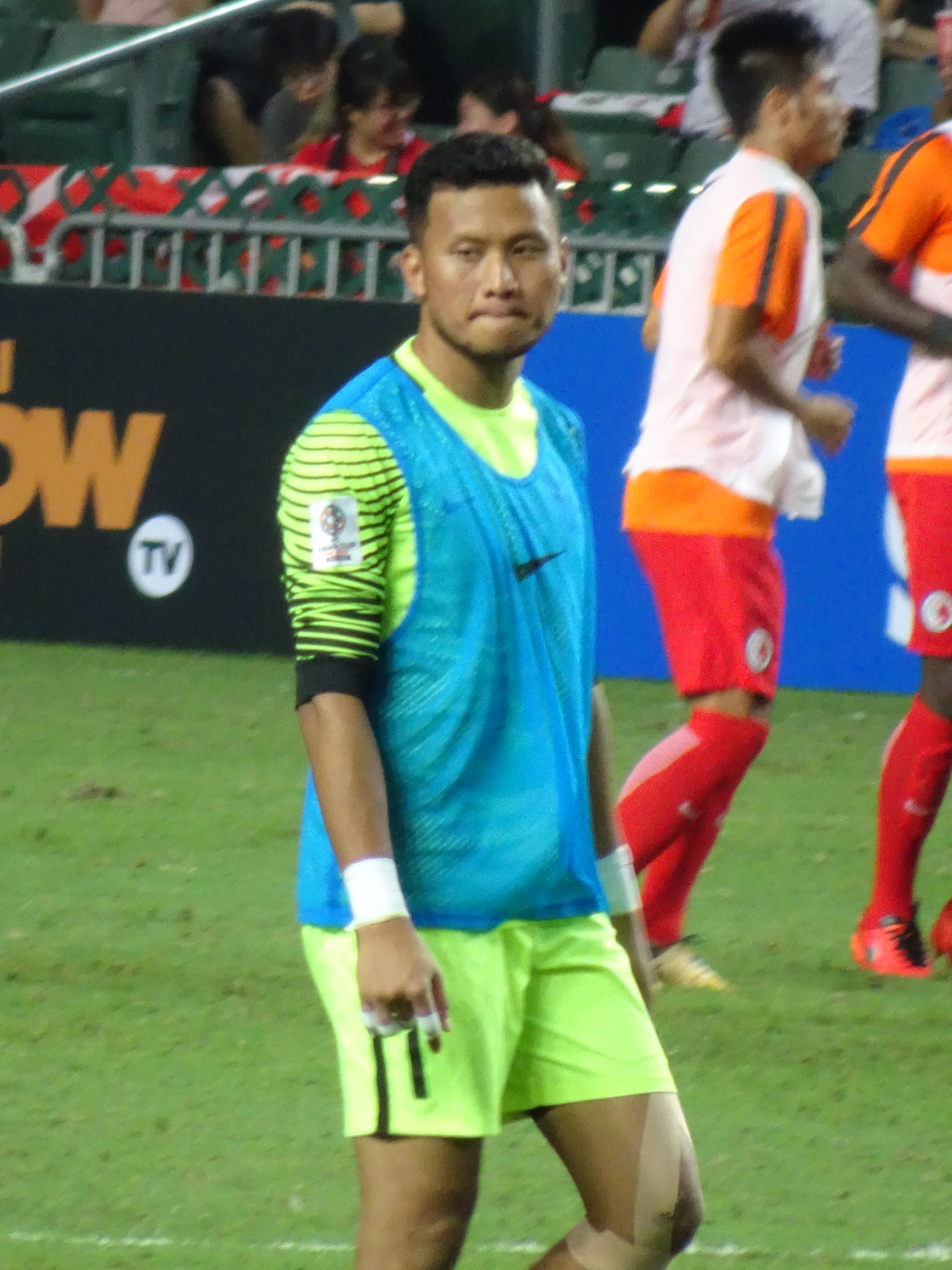
- Khairulazhan warming up for Malaysia in 2017

Personal information
- Full name: Muhammad Khairulazhan bin Mohd Khalid
- Date of birth: 7 November 1989 (age 37)
- Place of birth: Pahang, Malaysia
- Height: 1.82 m (5 ft 11 1/2 in)
- Position: Goalkeeper

Team information
- Current team: Penang
- Number: 1

Youth career
- 2009–2010: Pahang U-21

Senior career*
Years	Team	Apps	(Gls)
2011–2012	Shahzan Muda	36	(0)
2013–2015	Pahang	51	(0)
2016–2025	Selangor	100	(0)
2025–	Penang	14	(0)

International career^{‡}
2014–	Malaysia	14	(0)
2015	Malaysia XI	1	(0)
Medal record
Men's football
Representing Malaysia
AFF Championship
Runner-up	2014
- * Club domestic league appearances and goals as of 17 August 2026 ‡ National team caps and goals as of 15 June 2021

Muhammad Khairulazhan bin Mohd Khalid (born 7 November 1989) is a Malaysian professional footballer who most recently plays as a goalkeeper for Malaysia Super League club Penang and the Malaysia national team.

== Club career ==
=== Youth ===
The Kuantan-born custodian began his career as a footballer with Pahang U-21 as the main goalkeeper of the team. Khairulazhan participated in the 2010 Sukma Games, representing Pahang state. Khairulazhan continued his development through Pahang FA feeder team, Shahzan Muda in the FAM League.

=== Pahang ===
Khairulazhan signed with Pahang in 2013, and was Dollah Salleh's third choice goalkeeper in early 2013 season but injuries to Rosfaizul Azuar Ali and Nasril Nourdin in April 2013 saw the budding goalkeeper called into action. Khairulazhan made his competitive first appearance for Pahang in a 2–1 league match win over T-Team on 13 April 2013. He came on in the 71st minute to replace injured Rosfaizul Azuar. On 16 April 2013, Khairulazhan made his Malaysia FA Cup debut a 0–2 victory over Sime Darby. In his first season at Pahang, Khairulazhan finished his first season, making 9 league appearances and 2 clean sheets.

In his second season at Pahang, Khairulazhan continued to remain a first choice goalkeeper this season following the departure of Rosfaizul Azuar to Kuantan. On 17 January 2014, Khairulazhan made his Sultan Haji Ahmad Shah Cup debut against LionsXII.

On 13 November 2014, Khairulazhan won two awards in the National Football Awards. He won the Best Goalkeeper Award and the Most Valuable Players Award for 2014. Khairulazhan is the key player in Pahang's successful season in 2014 when his club won the Malaysia FA Cup and Malaysia Cup. Khairulazhan made 2 clean sheets, conceded 10 goals in 6 appearances during 2015 AFC Cup campaign. His debut was 2–3 win against Yadanarbon on 25 February 2015.

=== Selangor ===
In December 2015, Khairulazhan left Pahang to sign with Selangor. Khairulazhan made his competitive debut for the club against Petaling Jaya Rangers on 19 February 2016 in the Malaysia FA Cup. He made his Super League debut in a 1–3 away win over Pahang on 27 February 2017. Later, he made his debut on international club tournament AFC Cup on 10 May 2016 in a 1–0 defeat to Tampines Rovers.

On 19 April 2025, it was confirmed that Khairulazhan would leave Selangor at the end of the season, bringing his 10 years with the club to an end.

=== Penang ===
On 7th July 2025, Khairulazhan joined Malaysia Super League club Penang on the 2nd transfer window after leaving Selangor.

== International career ==
On 14 February 2014, Khairulazhan earned his first national call up for Malaysia's training squad preparation for 2015 AFC Asian Cup qualification match against Yemen.

Khairulazhan made his debut in a friendly against Philippines on 1 March 2014. Khairul received praises from the media and also his coach Ong Kim Swee, after his performances keeping a clean sheet in the 0–0 draw. Khairulazhan however was unable to play against Yemen due to injuries sustained in the Philippines match.

== Career statistics ==
=== Club ===
As of match played 19 April 2025

Appearances and goals by club, season and competition
Club	Season	League			Cup (Note: Includes Malaysia FA Cup)		League Cup (Note: Includes Malaysia Cup)		Continental		Total	
Club	Season	Division	Apps	Goals	Apps	Goals	Apps	Goals	Apps	Goals	Apps	Goals
Shahzan Muda	2011	Malaysia FAM League	??	0	—						??	0
Shahzan Muda	2012	Malaysia FAM League	??	0	1	0	—				??	0
Shahzan Muda	Total		??	0	1	0	0	0	0	0	??	0
Sri Pahang	2013	Malaysia Super League	9	0	3	0	11	0	–		23	0
Sri Pahang	2014	Malaysia Super League	20	0	7	0	8	0	–		35	0
Sri Pahang	2015	Malaysia Super League	22	0	5	0	8	0	6 (Note: Appearance(s) in AFC Cup)	0	41	0
Sri Pahang	Total		51	0	15	0	27	0	6	0	99	0
Selangor	2016	Malaysia Super League	8	0	2	0	8	0	2	0	20	0
Selangor	2017	Malaysia Super League	14	0	1	0	3	0	–		18	0
Selangor	2018	Malaysia Super League	14	0	5	0	3	0	–		22	0
Selangor	2019	Malaysia Super League	12	0	0	0	10	0	–		22	0
Selangor	2020	Malaysia Super League	9	0	0	0	1	0	–		10	0
Selangor	2021	Malaysia Super League	21	0	0	0	7	0	–		28	0
Selangor	2022	Malaysia Super League	7	0	0	0	7	0	–		14	0
Selangor	2023	Malaysia Super League	13	0	0	0	0	0	–		13	0
Selangor	2024–25	Malaysia Super League	2	0	0	0	0	0	0 (Note: Appearance(s) in AFC Champions League Two)	0	2	0
Selangor	Total		100	0	8	0	39	0	2	0	149	0
Penang	2025–26	Malaysia Super League	9	0	0	0	3	0	0	0	12	0
Penang	Total		9	0	0	0	3	0	0	0	12	0
Career total			158	0	24	0	69	0	8	0	261	0

=== International ===
As of 27 May 2022

Appearances and goals by national team and year
National team	Year	Apps	Goals
Malaysia	2014	1	0
Malaysia	2015	2	0
Malaysia	2016	3	0
Malaysia	2017	3	0
Malaysia	2019	3	0
Malaysia	2021	2	0
Malaysia	2022	1	0
Total		15	0

== Honours ==
Sri Pahang

- Malaysia Cup: 2013, 2014
- Malaysia FA Cup: 2014
- Malaysia Charity Shield: 2014

Selangor

- Malaysia Cup runner-up: 2016, 2022
- Malaysia FA Cup runner-up:2018, 2024
- Malaysia Challenge Cup: 2024–25

Penang

- MFL Challenge Cup runner-up: 2026

Malaysia

- AFF Suzuki Cup runner-up: 2014

Individual

- Most Valuable Player: 2014
- Best Goalkeeper: 2014
