= Astafei =

Astafei is a Romanian surname. Notable people with the surname include:

- Alina Astafei (born Galina Astafei in 1969), Romanian-born German track and field athlete
- Victoraș Astafei (born 1987), Romanian footballer
