= Michal Nguyễn =

Vietnamese-Czech footballer

Personal information
- Date of birth: 4 December 1989 (age 36)
- Place of birth: Litvínov, Czechoslovakia
- Height: 1.86 m (6 ft 1 in)
- Position: Center-back

Youth career
- 1998–1999: Litvínov
- 1999–2001: Teplice
- 2001–2009: Baník Most

Senior career*
Years	Team	Apps	(Gls)
2009–2014	Baník Most	61	(0)
2015–2018	Becamex Bình Dương	46	(0)
2018	Air Force Central	26	(0)
2019	Selangor	19	(0)
2021–2023	Baník Most-Souš	39	(1)

International career
2013	Vietnam	2	(0)
- * Club domestic league appearances and goals

Michal Nguyễn (Vietnamese: Nguyễn Michal, born 4 December 1989) is a former professional footballer who played as a center-back. Born in Czechoslovakia, he represented the Vietnam national football team.

== Club career ==
A youth product of Baník Most, Michal made his senior debut with the team in the 2010–11 Czech 2. Liga.

On 24 November 2014, Michal moved to Vietnam, signing for V.League 1 side Becamex Bình Dương. In his first season with the team, he won a treble, including the V.League 1, Vietnamese Cup and Vietnamese Super Cup.

== International career ==
In January 2013, Michal received his first call up to the Vietnam national team. He made his international debut on 6 February, in a 1–2 defeat against United Arab Emirates, as part of the 2015 AFC Asian Cup qualification.

== Career statistics ==
=== Club ===
Appearances and goals by club, season and competition
Club	Season	League			National cup		Continental		Other		Total	
Club	Season	Division	Apps	Goals	Apps	Goals	Apps	Goals	Apps	Goals	Apps	Goals
Becamex Binh Duong	2015	V.League 1					5 (Note: Appearances in AFC Champions League)					
Becamex Binh Duong	2016	V.League 1					3					
Becamex Binh Duong	2017	V.League 1					—					
Becamex Binh Duong	2018	V.League 1					—					
Career total												

=== International ===
Appearances and goals by national team and year
National team	Year	Apps	Goals
Vietnam	2013	2	0
Total		2	0

== Personal life ==
Michal was born in the Czechoslovakia to a Vietnamese father and a Czech mother.

== Honours ==
Becamex Bình Dương

- V.League 1: 2015
- Vietnamese Cup: 2015
- Vietnamese Super Cup: 2015

== See also ==
- List of Vietnam footballers born outside Vietnam
