= Ugo Ukah =

Italian-born Nigerian footballer (born 1984)

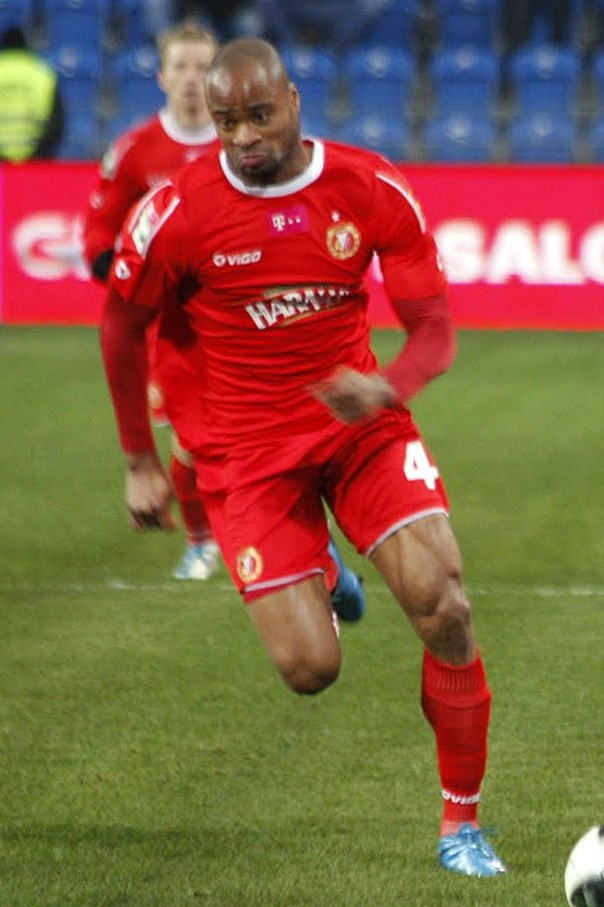
- Ugo with Widzew Łódź in 2011

Personal information
- Full name: Ugochukwu Ukah
- Date of birth: 18 January 1984 (age 42)
- Place of birth: Parma, Italy
- Height: 1.86 m (6 ft 1 in)
- Position: Defender

Youth career
- Parma

Senior career*
Years	Team	Apps	(Gls)
2001–2002	Brescello	6	(0)
2002–2003	Reggiana	0	(0)
2003–2004	Truentina Castel di Lama	30	(0)
2004–2005	Pro Vasto	25	(0)
2005–2006	Queens Park Rangers	3	(0)
2007	Giulianova	13	(0)
2007–2012	Widzew Łódź	113	(2)
2012–2014	Jagiellonia Białystok	53	(1)
2014–2015	Čukarički	13	(0)
2015–2016	Kalloni	19	(0)
2016–2017	Selangor	26	(1)
2018–2019	Penang	19	(1)
2019–2020	Kano Pillars	0	(0)

International career
2011	Nigeria	1	(0)
- * Club domestic league appearances and goals

Ugochukwu "Ugo" Ukah (born 18 January 1984) is a Nigerian former professional footballer. Born in Italy, Ukah represented the Nigeria national team.

== Club career ==
=== Early career ===
Ugo Ukah played for the youth team of Parma F.C. His first season as a senior player started in the 2001/2002 football season, when he joined fourth level side U.S. Brescello. In the summer of 2002, he signed with Italian top-league side A.C. Reggiana 1919 but failed to make an appearance in the Serie A. At the end of the season, he left Reggiana and for the next two seasons played with lower level sides Truentina Castel di Lama and F.C. Pro Vasto.

=== Queens Park Rangers ===
Ukah arrived at Queens Park Rangers F.C. in the summer of 2005. He stayed with QPR for one and a half seasons. The club played in the Championship, English second level, and Ukah, still young, spent most of the time on the bench making one appearance in the Championship in the 2005–06 season. In May 2006, QPR announced that Ukah had joined the Italian club Nuorese Calcio on a three-year contract. However, in November 2006, Ukah was suddenly listed as being back at QPR, with no explanation from the club. He was finally released from his contract and left the club in January 2007. He played the rest of the 2006–2007 season back in Italy with Serie C side Giulianova Calcio.

=== Career in Poland ===
Ukah then moved to Widzew Łódź in Poland and will play in the club for the next 5 seasons. He was one of the crucial players when Widzew became Polish First Division (second tier in Poland) champions two consecutive seasons 2008–09 and 2009–10). In April 2011, Ukah was suspended indefinitely from first team duties after he was convicted of driving under the influence.

After 5 seasons in Łódź, Ukah moved to another Polish top-flight side, Jagiellonia Białystok, where he played for the next two seasons.

=== Čukarički ===
In summer 2014 he became a free agent, and signed a one-year contract with an ambitious Serbian top-flight side FK Čukarički from the capital Belgrade. Ugo Ukah will not be prolonging his contract with Serbian SuperLiga side Čukarički, despite the lure of Europa League football. The central defender enjoyed success with Čukarički last season, helping the capital side win their first title since their formation 88 years ago – the Serbian Cup – and finish third in the SuperLiga. "I am not taking the option of extending my contract, my contract is over with Čukarički. I had a good season." Ugo Ukah told news24.com.

=== AEL Kalloni ===
It can be revealed that the contract Ugochukwu Ukah penned with Greek club Kalloni is designed for two years, playing in the Greek Super League."I have signed a two – year contract with Kalloni and will begin training with the team on Monday (July 6),” Ugo Ukah told allnigeriasoccer.com.

=== Selangor FA ===
In July 2016, Ukah signed a new contract with Malaysian Super League side, Selangor FA, replacing Robert Cornthwaite.

=== Penang FA ===
In February 2018, Malaysia Premier League outfit FA Penang have announced the arrival of Nigeria international defender Ugo Ukah on undisclosed terms. Allnigeriasoccer.com has been informed by the player himself that he has appended his signature to a two-year deal with The Panthers. Ukah currently plays for The Panthers, Penang FA, a professional association football club currently plays in the 2nd division of Malaysian football, the Malaysia Premier League.

== International career ==
Ukah who was born and raised in Parma, Italy stated that his family was very excited after he made his debut for the Eagles in Kaduna against Zambia. The 27-year-old player at time was first invited by coach Samson Siasia, but he never got his chance until the Kaduna game.

On 23 November 2014 Ukah, has said he was not shocked Nigeria failed to qualify for the 2015 Africa Cup of Nations in Equatorial Guinea because the country's best players are not playing for the team. The, by then, Čukarički central defender, who has been capped once by Nigeria, questioned the yardsticks coach Stephen Keshi used to call up players and why he benched players who would have helped Nigeria on match day. "I was not surprised that my darling country Nigeria did not qualify to defend the Nations Cup won just last year. This is because there are better players out there than the ones who are playing for Nigeria right now and so they deserve a chance to prove themselves in the national team", Ukah told africanFootball.com.

== Honours ==
Widzew Łódź

- I liga: 2008–09, 2009–10

Čukarički

- Serbian Cup: 2014–15
