= Azaruddin Aziz =

Malaysian footballer

Personal information
- Full name: Mohd Azaruddin Mohd Aziz
- Date of birth: 7 January 1971 (age 55)
- Place of birth: Dungun, Terengganu, Malaysia
- Positions: Defender; midfielder

Senior career*
| Years | Team | Apps | (Gls) |
| 1990–2001 | Pahang FA | | |
| 2002 | Negeri Sembilan Cempaka | | |
| 2003 | Transnasional FC | | |
| 2004 | Kesura FC | | |

International career
| 1994–1999 | Malaysia | | |

Managerial career
- 2005: Pahang U19 (assistant coach)
- 2006: SUKMA Pahang (assistant coach)
- 2007: Akademi Bola Sepak Pahang (head coach)
- 2008–2009: Pasukan Piala Emas Raja-Raja Pahang (head coach)
- 2010–2012: UMP FC (head coach)
- 2013– 2015: Pahang U21 (head coach)
- 2016–: Pahang FA (assistant head coach)
- * Club domestic league appearances and goals

Azaruddin Aziz (born 7 January 1971) is a former Malaysian footballer who was a midfielder for Pahang and the Malaysia national football team.

== Career ==
Aziz began playing at age 10 for his school's under-12 football team.

At 19, Azaruddin was the youngest player for the Pahang FA team after successfully attracting the attention of the Hungarian coach, Gyorgy Syager. Gyorgy convinced him to join the team.

== Coaching career ==
After retiring as a player, Azaruddin earned his coaching license and became an assistant coach for the under-19 state squad. In 2006, he took an assistant coaching position for the Sukma state squad. In 2007, he became Head Coach at the Pahang Football Academy and also spent two years coaching the Gold Cup squad Rulers of Pahang.

He is currently head coach for Pahang's U21s team.

== Achievements ==
=== International ===
- Runners-up Tiger Cup 1996

=== Club ===
With Pahang FA

- Champion 1992 Malaysia Cup
- Runners-up 1994, 1995, 1997 Malaysia Cup
- Champion 1992, 1995 M-League
