= Prabakaran Kanadasan =

Malaysian footballer

K. Prabakaran
Personal information
- Full name: Prabakaran a/l Kanadasan
- Date of birth: 30 May 1991 (age 35)
- Place of birth: Selangor, Malaysia
- Height: 1.78 m (5 ft 10 in)
- Position: Left-back

Youth career
- Harimau Muda

Senior career*
| Years | Team | Apps | (Gls) |
| –2011 | Selangor | | |
| 2012–2016 | Sime Darby | | |
| 2017 | Perlis | 7 | (0) |
| 2017–2018 | Felda United | 15 | (0) |
| 2019–2020 | Selangor | 24 | (0) |
| 2021–2022 | Petaling Jaya City | 21 | (0) |
| 2023 | Harini FT | | |
| 2024–2025 | Bunga Raya Damansara | | |

International career^{‡}
| | Malaysia U-23 | 6 | (0) |
| | Malaysia U-19 | 7 | (0) |
- * Club domestic league appearances and goals ‡ National team caps and goals as of 17 November 2016

Prabakaran a/l Kanadasan (born 30 May 1991) is a Malaysian professional footballer who plays as a left-back.

== Honours ==
- Malaysia Premier League: 2017
