= Rosfaizul Azuar Ali =

Malaysian footballer

Personal information
- Full name: Mohd Rosfaizul Azuar bin Ali
- Date of birth: 30 November 1984 (age 41)
- Place of birth: Maran, Pahang, Malaysia
- Height: 1.76 m (5 ft 9 1/2 in)
- Position: Goalkeeper

Senior career*
Years	Team	Apps	(Gls)
2007	My Team (2)	2	(0)
2007 – 2008	Shahzan Muda FC	19	(0)
2009 – 2013	Pahang FA	50	(0)
2014 – 2016	Kuantan FA		
- * Club domestic league appearances and goals as of January 23, 2017 ‡ National team caps and goals as of January 23, 2017

Mohd Rosfaizul Azuar Ali (born 1 January 1986 in Pahang), is a Malaysian footballer who currently plays for Malaysia FAM League side Kuantan FA, as a goalkeeper.

== Honours ==
=== Club ===
- Malaysia Cup: 1
  - Winners (1): 2013
- Malaysia FAM League: 1
  - Winners (1): 2014
