= Fairuz Abdul Aziz =

Malaysian footballer

Personal information
- Full name: Mohd Fairuz bin Abdul Aziz
- Date of birth: 21 August 1985 (age 41)
- Place of birth: Selangor, Malaysia
- Height: 1.83 m (6 ft 0 in)
- Position: Defender

Youth career
- 2003–2006: Selangor U-21

Senior career*
Years	Team	Apps	(Gls)
2006–2009	Selangor		
2009–2012	Sime Darby		
2012–2013	Selangor		
2013–2014	Sime Darby		
2014–2015	Kuala Lumpur		
2015–2016	AirAsia FC		
2016	Shah Alam Antlers		
2017–2018	Selangor	7	(0)
- * Club domestic league appearances and goals

Mohd Fairuz bin Abdul Aziz (born 21 August 1985) is a Malaysian professional footballer who plays as a defender.
