= Victoraș Astafei =

Romanian footballer

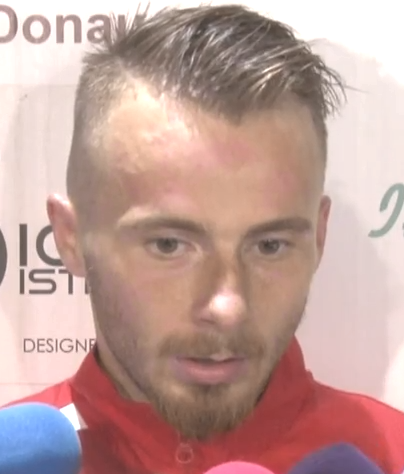

Personal information
- Full name: Victor Stelian Astafei
- Date of birth: 6 July 1987 (age 39)
- Place of birth: Târgu Mureș, Romania
- Height: 1.74 m (5 ft 9 in)
- Position: Winger

Team information
- Current team: MSE Târgu Mureș

Youth career
- 1997–2004: Olimpia Târgu Mureș

Senior career*
Years	Team	Apps	(Gls)
2004–2007	Unirea Ungheni	64	(41)
2007–2008	Transil Târgu Mureș	16	(8)
2008–2012	FCM Târgu Mureș	70	(11)
2009–2010	→ Arieșul Turda (loan)	22	(11)
2012	→ Gaz Metan Mediaș (loan)	16	(8)
2013–2014	Oțelul Galați	41	(7)
2014–2015	Petrolul Ploiești	29	(5)
2015–2016	Adana Demirspor	12	(1)
2016	Petrolul Ploiești	11	(4)
2016	Botoșani	19	(1)
2017	Selangor	11	(3)
2017–2018	Sepsi OSK	20	(3)
2018	Gorica	14	(6)
2018–2019	CSM Târgu Mureș	22	(34)
2019	Viitorul Târgu Jiu	16	(5)
2020–2021	CSM Reșița	21	(2)
2021–2024	Unirea Ungheni	76	(63)
2025–	MSE Târgu Mureș	5	(4)
- * Club domestic league appearances and goals as of 21 September 2024

Victor Stelian Astafei (born 6 July 1987) is a Romanian professional footballer who plays as a winger for Liga III club MSE Târgu Mureș.

== Personal life ==
He is also a rapper with the stage name Ăsta (This One).

In January 2016 he released a hip hop album with nine tracks called Sunt aici să mă satur (I am here to satiate).

== Honours ==
Unirea Ungheni

- Liga IV – Mureș County: 2006–07

Gorica

- Druga HNL: 2017–18

CSM Târgu Mureș

- Liga IV – Mureș County: 2018–19
