= 2015 Terengganu FA season =

Terengganu
2015 season
- President: Wan Ahmad Nizam
- Manager: Marzuki Sulong
- Stadium: Sultan Mizan Zainal Abidin Stadium (Capacity: 50,000)
- Super League: 4th
- FA Cup: Quarter-finals
- Malaysia Cup: Group stage
- Top goalscorer: League: Issey Nakajima (9); All: Paulo Rangel (16)
- Highest home attendance: 50,000 vs (vs LionsXII, 16 May 2015)
- Lowest home attendance: 0 vs (vs Johor Darul Takzim, 20 June 2015)
- Average home league attendance: 11,616
Home colours	Away colours	Third colours

The 2015 season was Terengganu's 5th season in the Malaysia Super League, and their 20th consecutive season in the top-flight of Malaysian football. In addition, they were competing in the domestic tournaments, the Malaysia FA Cup and the Malaysia Cup

Terengganu will announce their sponsors for the 2015 season as well as presenting the new kits on 18 January 2015.

== Club ==
=== Current coaching staff ===
Position	Name
Head coach	Ilyas Iqbal (interim)
Assistant coach	Subri Sulong
Reserve team coach	Zakari Alias
Goalkeeping coach	Mohd Zubir Ibrahim
Fitness Coach	Joseph Ronald D' Angelus
Physiotherapist	Zulkifli Mohd Zin
Doctor	YBHG. Dato' Dr. Syed Mohammad Salleh

=== Management ===
Position	Staff
President	Wan Ahmad Nizam
1st Vice-president	Haji Mazlan Ngah
2nd Vice-president	Marzuki Sulong
Manager	Marzuki Sulong
1st Vice-Manager	Zulkifli Ali
2nd Vice-Manager	Ahmad Awang
Security Officer	YBHG. Dato' Hj. Mokhtar Nong
Media Officer	Haslan Hashim

- Last updated:

=== Kit sponsors ===
• Umbro •

== Players ==
=== Squad information ===
N	P	Nat.	Name	Date of birth	Age	Since	End	Notes
1	GK	(Malaysia)	Hafidz Romly^{LP}	20 September 1989	26	2014	2015	
2	DF	(Malaysia)	Khairul Rosmadi^{LP}	8 January 1993	22	2014	2017	From Youth system
3	DF	(Malaysia)	Muhaimin Omar^{LP}	17 March 1989	26	2009	2016	
4	DF	(Malaysia)	Abdullah Suleiman^{LP}	1 April 1994	21	2014	2015	
5	DF	(Cameroon)	Vincent Bikana^{FP}	26 February 1992	23	2012	2016	
6	DF	(Malaysia)	Radhi Yusof^{LP}	11 February 1993	22	2014	2017	From Youth system
7	MF	(Malaysia)	Zairo Anuar^{LP}	18 June 1982	33	2013	2016	Team vice-captain
8	MF	(Argentina)	Gustavo Fabián López^{FP}	28 April 1983	32	2014	2016	
9	FW	(Brazil)	Paulo Rangel^{FP}	4 February 1985	30	2014	2016	
11	GK	(Malaysia)	Sharbinee Allawee^{LP}	7 December 1986	29	2013	2016	
12	MF	(Malaysia)	Hafizal Mohamad^{LP}	12 January 1993	22	2014	2017	From Youth system
13	DF	(Malaysia)	Hasmizan Kamarodin^{LP}	24 January 1984	31	2010	2016	
14	MF	(Malaysia)	Mohd Fakhrurazi Musa^{LP}	26 September 1991	24	2011	2017	
15	DF	(Malaysia)	Nasril Izzat Jalil^{LP}	15 April 1991	24	2012	2016	
16	DF	(Malaysia)	Zubir Azmi^{LP}	14 November 1991	24	2010	2017	
17	MF	(Malaysia)	Khairul Ramadhan^{LP}	2 February 1988	27	2012	2016	
18	MF	(Malaysia)	Ahmad Nordin Alias^{LP}	26 October 1985	30	2009	2016	Team captain
19	DF	(Malaysia)	Azlan Zainal^{LP}	19 April 1989	28	2010	2015	
20	MF	(Malaysia)	Sharin Sapien^{LP}	12 April 1994	21	2015	2016	
21	DF	(Malaysia)	Helmi Remeli^{LP}	24 March 1985	30	2014	2016	
22	MF	(Malaysia)	Ashari Samsudin^{LP}	7 June 1985	30	2005	2016	
23	FW	(Malaysia)	Abdul Manaf Mamat^{LP}	8 April 1987	28	2008	2015	
24	GK	(Malaysia)	Shamirza Yusoff^{LP}	7 June 1989	26	2011	2016	
25	MF	(Malaysia)	Ismail Faruqi Asha'ri^{LP}	15 October 1986	29	2010	2016	
44	MF	(Canada)	Issey Nakajima-Farran^{FP}	16 May 1984	31	2015	2016	
45	FW	(Malaysia)	Norshahrul Idlan^{LP}	8 June 1986	29	2015	2016	

As of 3 April 2015

Ordered by squad number.

^{LP}Local player; ^{FP}Foreign player; ^{NR}Non-registered player

== Transfers and loans ==
All start dates are pending confirmation.

=== In ===
==== November ====
#	Position:	Player	Transferred from	Fee	Date	Source
12	MF	(Malaysia) Hafizal Mohamad	Youth system	N/A	23 October 2014	
2	DF	(Malaysia) Khairul Rosmadi	Youth system	N/A	2 November 2014	
6	DF	(Malaysia) Radhi Yusof	Youth system	N/A	2 November 2014	
21	DF	(Malaysia) Helmi Remeli	(Malaysia) PKNS	N/A	6 November 2014	
8	MF	(Argentina) Gustavo López	(Indonesia) Arema Cronus	N/A	8 November 2014	
10	FW	(Lebanon) Hassan Chaito	(Bahrain) Al-Shabab	N/A	26 November 2014	
9	FW	(Brazil) Paulo Rangel	(Malaysia) Selangor	N/A	26 November 2014	
20	MF	(Malaysia) Sharin Sapien	(Malaysia) T-Team	N/A	27 November 2014	
4	DF	(Malaysia) Abdullah Suleiman	(Malaysia) Harimau Muda B	N/A	4 December 2014	

==== April ====
#	Position:	Player	Transferred from	Fee	Date	Source
44	FW	(Canada) Issey Nakajima-Farran	(Canada) Montreal Impact	N/A	3 April 2015	
45	FW	(Malaysia) Norshahrul Idlan	(Malaysia) ATM	N/A	9 April 2015	

=== Out ===
==== November ====
#	Position:	Player	Transferred to	Fee	Date	Source
45	FW	(Senegal) Moustapha Dabo	Free agent	Undisclosed	23 October 2014	
46	FW	(Colombia) Javier Estupiñán	Free agent	Undisclosed	23 October 2014	
10	MF	(Malaysia) Nor Farhan Muhammad	(Malaysia) Kelantan	Undisclosed	29 October 2014	
20	MF	(Australia) Mario Karlović	(Malaysia) ATM	Undisclosed	4 November 2014	
2	DF	(Malaysia) Mazlizam Mohamad	(Malaysia) Penang	Undisclosed	5 November 2014	
23	MF	(Malaysia) Faiz Subri	(Malaysia) Penang	Undisclosed	5 November 2014	

==== April ====
#	Position:	Player	Transferred to	Fee	Date	Source
10	FW	(Lebanon) Hassan Chaito	Free agent	N/A	10 February 2015	

=== Loan out ===
#	Position:	Player	To	Fee	Until	Source
	MF	(Malaysia) Nor Hakim Hassan	(Malaysia) T-Team	Undisclosed	30 November 2015	
	GK	(Malaysia) Izzuddin Hussin	(Malaysia) T-Team	Undisclosed	30 November 2015	
	FW	(Malaysia) Izzaq Faris Ramlan	(Malaysia) T-Team	Undisclosed	30 November 2015	

== Pre-season and friendlies ==
22 December 2014 Friendly	Terengganu (Malaysia)	1–3	(Malaysia) T-Team	Kuala Nerus
17:00 UTC+08:00	Zairo		Ramzul; Faizuddin Manjur	Stadium: Complex Gong Badak

5 January 2015 Friendly	T-Team (Malaysia)	1–2	(Malaysia) Terengganu	Kuala Nerus
16:45 UTC+08:00	Tadjiyev		Ashari; Amirul Syahmin	Stadium: Complex Gong Badak

9 January 2015 Friendly	Terengganu (Malaysia)	3–1	(Singapore) LionsXII	Kuala Terengganu
20:45 UTC+08:00	Rangel 4', 25', 43'	Report	Isa 41'	Stadium: Sultan Ismail Nasiruddin Shah Stadium

13 January 2015 Friendly	Terengganu (Malaysia)	0–0	(Malaysia) Kelantan	Kuala Terengganu
20:45 UTC+08:00				Stadium: Sultan Ismail Nasiruddin Shah Stadium

23 January 2015 Friendly	NS Matrix (Malaysia)	2–0	(Malaysia) Terengganu	Paroi
20:45 UTC+08:00	Bikana 61' (o.g.); Doe 90'	Report		Stadium: Tuanku Abdul Rahman Stadium

25 January 2015 Friendly	DRB-Hicom (Malaysia)	1–2	(Malaysia) Terengganu	Tanjung Malim
16:45 UTC+08:00	Ahmad Saufi	Report	Rangel 1' (pen.)	Stadium: Proton Stadium

28 January 2015 Friendly	Terengganu (Malaysia)	4–1	(Malaysia) Kuantan	Kuala Terengganu
20:45 UTC+08:00	Ashari 35'; Manaf 45+2'; Rangel 55'; Faruqi 71'	Report	Razreen 7'	Stadium: Sultan Ismail Nasiruddin Shah Stadium

== Competitions ==
=== Overview ===
Updated as of 18 September 2015.

Competition	Record							
Competition	G	W	D	L	GF	GA	GD	Win %
Super League	22	12	2	8	40	33	+7	54.55
FA Cup	6	4	1	1	13	6	+7	66.67
Malaysia Cup	6	2	1	3	8	12	−4	33.33
Total	34	18	4	12	60	56	+4	52.94

== Super League ==
=== League table ===
Pos	Team	Pld	W	D	L	GF	GA	GD	Pts	Qualification or relegation
2	Selangor	22	11	6	5	43	28	+15	39	Qualification to AFC Cup group stage (Note: Since Lions XII, who won the 2015 Piala FA, are a side managed by the Football Association of Singapore and thus ineligible to represent Malaysia in continental competition, the 2015 Liga Super runners-up will be chosen to represent Malaysia in the AFC Cup.)
3	Pahang	22	13	5	4	43	29	+14	38 (Note: Pahang was docked 6 points due to involvement in the delay in the process of solving the problem of salary and compensation by the former imports season 2013, Mohamed Borji.)	
4	Terengganu	22	12	2	8	40	33	+7	38	
5	Felda United	22	10	6	6	36	26	+10	36	
6	PDRM	22	11	2	9	42	39	+3	35	

Source: FAM Official Site, Astro Arena
Rules for classification: 1) points; 2) goal difference; 3) number of goals scored

==== Results summary ====
Overall								Home						Away					
Pld	W	D	L	GF	GA	GD	Pts	W	D	L	GF	GA	GD	W	D	L	GF	GA	GD
22	12	2	8	40	33	+7	38	8	1	2	23	14	+9	4	1	6	17	19	−2

Last updated: 22 August 2015.
Source: Competitive matches

==== Results by round ====
Round	1	2	3	4	5	6	7	8	9	10	11	12	13	14	15	16	17	18	19	20	21	22
Ground	H	A	H	H	A	H	A	H	A	A	H	A	A	H	A	A	H	A	H	A	H	H
Result	W	L	W	D	D	W	W	L	L	L	L	L	L	W	W	W	W	W	W	L	W	W
Position	5	7	4	4	6	6	2	5	7	7						7	6	5	4	5	4	4

Updated to match(es) played on 22 August 2015. Source: Competitive Matches
A = Away; H = Home; W = Win; D = Draw; L = Loss

=== Matches ===
Win Draw Loss
Kickoff times are in +08:00 GMT.

7 February 2015 1	Terengganu	2–0	Selangor	Kuala Terengganu
20:45	Faruqi 38'; Zubir (yellow card) 53'; Manaf (yellow card) 62'; Gustavo 72'	Report		Stadium: Sultan Ismail Nasiruddin Shah Stadium; Attendance: 10,000; Referee: Syed Azhar Syed Kamar (Kuala Lumpur)

14 February 2015 2	Sarawak	3–1	Terengganu	Kuching
20:45	Mehmet 5'; Ashri 6'; Ronald (yellow card) 31'; Joseph 39'; Dzulfadli 45+3'; Fatić (yellow card) 66'; Aidil (yellow card) 90+1'	Report	Rangel 14', (yellow card) 46'; Helmi (yellow card) 90+6'	Stadium: Sarawak Stadium; Attendance: 10,000; Referee: Zulkifli Ahmad (Kuala Lumpur)

21 February 2015 3	Terengganu	2–1	Sime Darby	Kuala Terengganu
20:45	Rangel 45+2', 77'; Faruqi (yellow card) 39'	Report	Vidaković 60'	Stadium: Sultan Ismail Nasiruddin Shah Stadium; Attendance: 8,200; Referee: Nazmi Nasaruddin (Penang)

7 March 2015 4	Terengganu	2–2	ATM	Kuala Terengganu
20:45	Rangel 32', 47'; Manaf (yellow card) 37'	Report	Shukur (yellow card) 9'; Palacios 68'; Jayaseelan 74'	Stadium: Sultan Ismail Nasiruddin Shah Stadium; Attendance: 7,400; Referee: Nagor Amir (Penang)

14 March 2015 5	LionsXII	1–1	Terengganu	Kallang
19:45	Faris 54'; Sahil (yellow card) 81'; Syafiq (yellow card) 82'	Report	Bikana 9', (yellow card) 90+1'	Stadium: Jalan Besar Stadium; Attendance: 5,384; Referee: Nafiz Abd Wahab (Johor)

4 April 2015 6	Terengganu	2–1	Kelantan	Kuala Terengganu
20:45	Ismail 50'; Sharin 79'	Report	Nor Farhan (yellow card) 42'; Badhri 76'	Stadium: Sultan Ismail Nasiruddin Shah Stadium; Attendance: 7,330; Referee: Zamzaidi Katimin (Malacca)

11 April 2015 7	Perak	2–3	Terengganu	Ipoh
20:45	Namkung 21'; Charles 82'	Report	Azlan (yellow card) 43'; Helmi (yellow card) 58', (goal) 85'; Bikana 64'; Ismail 75'; Sharbinee (yellow card) 87'	Stadium: Perak Stadium; Attendance: 10,000; Referee: Nagor Amir (Penang)

18 April 2015 8	Terengganu	1–3	Felda United	Kuala Terengganu
20:45	Azlan (yellow card) 22'; Rangel 63'	Report	Syamim 20'; Makeche 80'; Krangar 84'; Syahid (yellow card) 86'	Stadium: Sultan Ismail Nasiruddin Shah Stadium; Attendance: 7,000; Referee: Nafeez Abd Wahab (Johor)

25 April 2015 9	PDRM FA	3–1	Terengganu	Shah Alam
20:45	Shahurain 8'; Traoré 18'; Ashfaq 22'; Fekry (yellow card) 34'	Report	Helmi (yellow card) 17'; Zubir (yellow card) 30'; Issey 90+2'	Stadium: Shah Alam Stadium; Attendance: 1,000; Referee: Nagor Amir (Penang)

2 May 2015 10	Pahang FA	3–2	Terengganu	Kuantan
20:45	Rehman 27', 45+2'; Stewart (yellow card) 49'; Conti 57'; Matthew (yellow card) 80'	Report	Paulo Rangel 23', 81'	Stadium: Darul Makmur Stadium; Attendance: 17,718; Referee: Amirul Izwan (Perak)

20 June 2015 11	Terengganu	0–1	Johor Darul Ta'zim	Kuala Terengganu
22:00	Helmi (yellow card) 32'	Report	Figueroa 78'; Mahali (yellow card) 88'	Stadium: Sultan Ismail Nasiruddin Shah Stadium; Attendance: Referee: Suhaizi Shukri (Malacca)

23 June 2015 12	Johor Darul Ta'zim	2–0	Terengganu	Larkin
22:00	Aidil 45+2'; Figueroa 90+2'	Report	Bikana (yellow card) 25'; Norshahrul (yellow card) 69'; Zairo (yellow card) 82'	Stadium: Tan Sri Dato Haji Hassan Yunos Stadium; Attendance: 6,900; Referee: Lismotia Mohem (Negeri Sembilan)

27 June 2015 13	Selangor	2–0	Terengganu	Shah Alam
22:00	Hadi 4'; Cornthwaite 23'	Report		Stadium: Shah Alam Stadium; Attendance: 4,142; Referee: Nagor Amir (Penang)

4 July 2015 14	Terengganu	4–2	Sarawak	Kuala Nerus
22:00	Fakhrurazi 24'; Faruqi 35', 64'; Nyema 85' (o.g.)	Report	Griffiths 9'; Mazwandi (yellow card) 14'; Varathan (yellow card) 50'; Ivan 54'	Stadium: Sultan Mizan Zainal Abidin Stadium; Attendance: 500; Referee: Nazmi Nasaruddin (Penang)

8 July 2015 15	Sime Darby	0–2	Terengganu	Selayang
22:00	Areff (yellow card) 71'	Report	Ashari 26', 80'; Hasmizan (yellow card) 74'	Stadium: Majlis Perbandaran Selayang Stadium; Attendance: 700; Referee: Nagor Amir (Penang)

1 August 2015 16	ATM	1–5	Terengganu	Paroi
20:45	Abdulafees 23'	Report	Faruqi 17'; Gustavo 50'; Issey 56', 73', 80'	Stadium: Tuanku Abdul Rahman Stadium; Attendance: 2,000; Referee: Nagor Amir (Penang)

5 August 2015 17	Terengganu	4–2	LionsXII	Kuala Nerus
20:45	Helmi 8'; Issey 26', 52'; Norshahrul 57'; Fakhrurazi (yellow card) 75'	Report	Madhu 25'; Hafiz 55'	Stadium: Sultan Mizan Zainal Abidin Stadium; Attendance: 6,500; Referee: Zamzaidi Katimin (Malacca)

8 August 2015 18	Kelantan	1–2	Terengganu	Kota Bahru
20:45	Fakri 1'; Amirizdwan (yellow card) 80'; Fitri (yellow card) 83'	Report	Bikana 25'; Ashari Samsudin 74'; Issey (yellow card) 78'	Stadium: Sultan Mohammad IV Stadium; Attendance: 3,512; Referee: Lismotia Mohem (Negeri Sembilan)

12 August 2015 19	Terengganu	2–1	Perak	Kuala Nerus
20:45	Faruqi 22'; Issey 26'; Zubir (yellow card) 73'	Report	Bobby Gonzales 37'; Norhakim (yellow card) 81'; Tuah (yellow card) 90+3'	Stadium: Sultan Mizan Zainal Abidin Stadium; Attendance: 6,200; Referee: Zulhaidi Dzulkifli (Johor)

15 August 2015 20	FELDA United	1–0	Terengganu	Selayang
20:45	Syahmim (yellow card) 35'; Adib (yellow card) 45+3'; Makeche 58'; Indra (yellow card) 76'	Report	Hafizal (yellow card) 61'; Faruqi (yellow card) 84'	Stadium: Majlis Perbandaran Selayang Stadium; Attendance: 1,361; Referee: Zamzaidi Katimin (Malacca)

19 August 2015 21	Terengganu	1–0	PDRM	Kuala Nerus
20:45	Bikana (yellow card) 40'; Hasmizan (yellow card) 45+2'; Fakhrurazi (yellow card) 53'; Faruqi (yellow card) 59'; Helmi (yellow card) 61'; Gustavo (yellow card) 64'; Issey 82'	Report	Shahurain (yellow card) 34'; Azrul (yellow card) 40'; Traore (yellow card) 74'; Bragança (yellow card) 81'	Stadium: Sultan Mizan Zainal Abidin Stadium; Attendance: 7,600; Referee: Wan Mohd Tarmizi (Selangor)

22 August 2015 22	Terengganu	3–1	Pahang	Kuala Nerus
20:45	Issey 16', (yellow card) 90'; Ashari 34'; Nasril 68'	Report	Stewart 49'; R. Surendran (yellow card) 51'	Stadium: Sultan Mizan Zainal Abidin Stadium; Attendance: 30,000; Referee: Zamzaidi Katimin (Malacca)

== FA Cup ==
=== Round of 32 ===
28 February 2015 1st	Malacca United	1–3	Terengganu	Malacca City
20:45	Doliente (yellow card) 33'; Faiz (yellow card) 44'; Nurshamil 88'	Report	Manaf 47'; Rangel 53', 72' (pen.); Azlan (yellow card) 74' (yellow-red card)	Stadium: Hang Jebat Stadium; Attendance: 15,000; Referee: Jefri Zolkefli (Perak)

=== Round of 16 ===
18 March 2015 2nd	Selangor	1–3 (a.e.t.)	Terengganu	Shah Alam
20:45	Guilherme 22', (yellow card) 113'; Leandro (yellow card) 61'	Report	Sharin (yellow card) 68'; Rangel (yellow card) 84'; Bikana 90'; Cornthwaite 105' (o.g.); Sharbinee (yellow card) 110'; Zairo 120+1'; Fakhrurazi (yellow card) 120+2'	Stadium: Shah Alam Stadium; Attendance: 14,300; Referee: Zamzaidi Katimin (Malacca)

=== Quarter-finals ===
7 April 2015 First leg	Terengganu	1–1	Perak	Kuala Terengganu
20:45	Gustavo (yellow card) 18'; Ismail (red card) 52'; Rangel 90+5' (pen.)	Report	Zubir 45' (o.g.); Mugenthiran (yellow card) 56'; Thiago (yellow card) 56'; Haris 85'; Idris (yellow card) 90+5'	Stadium: Sultan Ismail Nasiruddin Shah Stadium; Attendance: 8,782; Referee: Nazmi Nasaruddin (Penang)

21 April 2015 Second leg	Perak	0–2 (1–3 agg.)	Terengganu	Ipoh
20:45	Sukri (yellow card) 73'; Hisyamudin (yellow card) 90+1'	Report	Rangel 21', (yellow card) 61'; Issey 55'	Stadium: Perak Stadium; Attendance: 5,000; Referee: Wan Mohd Tarmizi (Selangor)

=== Semi-finals ===
9 May 2015 First leg	LionsXII	2–1	Terengganu	Singapore
20:45	Gabriel (yellow card) 29'; Khairul 30'; Faris 34'; Safuwan (yellow card) 38'	Report	Gustavo 39'; Azlan (yellow card) 45+1'; Zubir (yellow card) 75'; Zairo (yellow card) 77'; Hafizal (yellow card) 83'; Helmi (yellow card) 87'	Stadium: Jalan Besar Stadium; Attendance: 5,891; Referee: Zamzaidi Katimin (Malacca)

16 May 2015 Second leg	Terengganu	3–2 (4–4 a agg.)	LionsXII	Kuala Terengganu
20:45	Rangel 22', 45+2', (red card) 90'; Norshahrul 60'; Bikana (yellow card) 61'; Gustavo (yellow card) 90+3' (yellow-red card)	Report	Amri 18', 28'; Madhu (yellow card) 37'; Raihan (yellow card) 40'; Izwan (yellow card) 45+3'	Stadium: Sultan Ismail Nasiruddin Shah Stadium; Attendance: 50,000; Referee: Amirul Izwan (Perak)

== Malaysia Cup ==
=== Group stage ===
Pos	Team	Pld	W	D	L	GF	GA	GD	Pts	Qualification
1	(Singapore) LionsXII	6	4	1	1	9	7	+2	13	Advance to knockout phase
2	Kedah	6	3	1	2	15	9	+6	10	Advance to knockout phase
3	Terengganu	6	2	1	3	8	12	−4	7	
4	Johor Darul Ta'zim II	6	1	1	4	7	11	−4	4	

Source: FAM Astro Arena

12 September 2015 1	Terengganu	0–0	Johor Darul Ta'zim II	Kuala Nerus
20:45	Ashari (yellow card) 32'	Report	Irfan (yellow card) 33'; Delmonte (yellow card) 67'; Ramzi (yellow card) 90+3'	Stadium: Sultan Mizan Zainal Abidin Stadium; Attendance: 13,500; Referee: Zulkifli Ahmad

18 September 2015 2	Kedah	5–0	Terengganu	Alor Setar
20:45	Baddrol (yellow card) 30'; Sandro 52', 66', 83'; Farhan 72'; Alif 87'	Report	Hafizal (red card) 24'; Norshahrul (red card) 75'	Stadium: Darul Aman Stadium; Attendance: 15,754; Referee: Nazmi Nasaruddin

26 September 2015 3	LionsXII	3–2	Terengganu	Kallang
19:45	Sahil 35'; Safuwan 53', 89'; Nazrul (yellow card) 71'; Madhu (yellow card) 80'; Izzdin (yellow card) 84'	Report	Rangel 4', 44'; Bikana (yellow card) 27'; Sharbinee (yellow card) 64'; Zubir (yellow card) 73'	Stadium: Jalan Besar Stadium; Attendance: 5,386; Referee: Wan Mohd Tarmizi

27 October 2015 4	Johor Darul Ta'zim II	1–2	Terengganu	Pasir Gudang
20:45	Shahril 34'; Akmal (yellow card) 56'	Report	Issey 8'; Gustavo (yellow card) 30'; Dhiyaulrahman (yellow card) 48'; Faruqi 87'	Stadium: Pasir Gudang Corporation Stadium; Attendance: 4,400; Referee: S Sitharajan

16 October 2015 5	Terengganu	3–1	Kedah	Kuala Nerus
20:45	Bikana (yellow card) 10'; Ismail (yellow card) 21'; Issey 24', 73'; Sharin (yellow card) 53'; Hasmizan 76'	Report	Sandro (yellow card) 21'; Bang (yellow card) 65', (goal) 70'; Farhan (yellow card) 82'	Stadium: Sultan Mizan Zainal Abidin Stadium; Attendance: 8,600; Referee: Wan Muhammad Tarmizi

4 November 2015 6	Terengganu	1–2	LionsXII	Kuala Nerus
20:45	Dhiyaulrahman 15'; Issey (yellow card) 81'	Report	Sufian 16', (yellow card) 55'; Christopher 90'; Izzdin (yellow card) 90+2'	Stadium: Sultan Mizan Zainal Abidin Stadium; Attendance: 35,000; Referee: Syed Azhar

Source: FAM
Last updated:

== Statistics ==
=== Squad statistics ===
No.	Pos	Nat	Player	Total		Super League		FA Cup		Malaysia Cup	
No.	Pos	Nat	Player	Apps	Goals	Apps	Goals	Apps	Goals	Apps	Goals
Goalkeepers
1	GK	(Malaysia) MAS	Hafidz Romly	0	0	0	0	0	0	0	0
11	GK	(Malaysia) MAS	Sharbinee Allawee	33	0	22	0	5	0	6	0
24	GK	(Malaysia) MAS	Shamirza Yusoff	1	0	0+1	0	0	0	0	0
Defenders
2	DF	(Malaysia) MAS	Khairul Rosmadi	0	0	0	0	0	0	0	0
3	DF	(Malaysia) MAS	Muhaimin Omar	2	0	0+1	0	0	0	1	0
4	DF	(Malaysia) MAS	Abdullah Suleiman	0	0	0	0	0	0	0	0
5	DF	(Cameroon) CMR	Vincent Bikana	32	4	21	3	5	1	6	0
6	DF	(Malaysia) MAS	Radhi Yusof	1	0	0+1	0	0	0	0	0
12	DF	(Malaysia) MAS	Hafizal Mohamad	15	0	7+1	0	0+2	0	4+1	0
13	DF	(Malaysia) MAS	Hasmizan Kamarodin	22	1	13	0	3	0	6	1
16	DF	(Malaysia) MAS	Zubir Azmi	30	0	19+1	0	4	0	6	0
19	DF	(Malaysia) MAS	Azlan Zainal	18	0	10+4	0	2+1	0	0+1	0
21	DF	(Malaysia) MAS	Helmi Remeli	21	2	16	2	4	0	1	0
Midfielders
7	MF	(Malaysia) MAS	Zairo Anuar	28	1	5+15	0	4+1	1	0+3	0
8	MF	(Argentina) ARG	Gustavo López	31	3	20	2	5	1	6	0
14	MF	(Malaysia) MAS	Fakhrurazi Musa	26	1	8+10	1	0+3	0	1+4	0
15	MF	(Malaysia) MAS	Nasril Izzat	9	1	1+3	1	1	0	0+4	0
17	MF	(Malaysia) MAS	Khairul Ramadhan	1	0	0	0	1	0	0	0
18	MF	(Malaysia) MAS	Nordin Alias	33	0	22	0	4+1	0	6	0
20	MF	(Malaysia) MAS	Sharin Sapien	27	1	10+7	1	3+1	0	2+4	0
22	MF	(Malaysia) MAS	Ashari Samsudin	25	4	17+2	4	1+2	0	3	0
25	MF	(Malaysia) MAS	Ismail Faruqi	27	8	14+4	7	2+1	0	6	1
31	MF	(Malaysia) MAS	Dhiyaulrahman	3	1	0	0	0	0	3	1
Forwards
9	FW	(Brazil) BRA	Paulo Rangel	15	15	10	8	4	5	1	2
23	FW	(Malaysia) MAS	Manaf Mamat	19	1	6+9	0	2+2	1	0	0
44	FW	(Canada) CAN	Issey Nakajima-Farran	19	13	7+5	9	2	1	5	3
45	FW	(Malaysia) MAS	Norshahrul Idlan	19	2	13	1	3	1	3	0
Transfers out
10	FW	(Lebanon) LBN	Hassan Chaito	0	0	0	0	0	0	0	0

Last updated: 4 November 2015
Source: Competitions

Perak vs Terengganu no record

=== Top scorers ===
Rank	Player	Position	Super League	FA Cup	Malaysia Cup	Total
1	(Brazil) Paulo Rangel	FW	8	6	2	16
2	(Canada) Issey Nakajima-Farran	MF	9	1	3	13
3	(Malaysia) Ismail Faruqi	MF	7	0	1	8
4	(Malaysia) Ashari Samsudin	MF	4	0	0	4
4	(Cameroon) Vincent Bikana	DF	3	1	0	4
6	(Argentina) Gustavo López	MF	2	1	0	3
7	(Malaysia) Norshahrul Idlan	FW	1	1	0	2
7	(Malaysia) Helmi Remeli	DF	2	0	0	2
9	(Malaysia) Abdul Manaf Mamat	FW	0	1	0	1
9	(Malaysia) Zairo Anuar	MF	0	1	0	1
9	(Malaysia) Fakhrurazi Musa	MF	1	0	0	1
9	(Malaysia) Nasril Izzat	MF	1	0	0	1
9	(Malaysia) Sharin Sapien	MF	1	0	0	1
9	(Malaysia) Hasmizan Kamarodin	DF	0	0	1	1
9	(Malaysia) Dhiyaulrahman	MF	0	0	1	1
Total			39	12	8	59

Last updated:4 November 2015
Source: Match reports in Competitive matches

=== Clean sheets ===
Rank	Player	Position	Super League	FA Cup	Malaysia Cup	Total
1	(Malaysia) Sharbinee Allawee	GK	3	1	1	5
Total			3	1	1	5

Last updated:12 September 2015
Source: Match reports in Competitive matches

=== Disciplinary record ===
N	P	Nat.	Name	Super League			FA Cup			Malaysia Cup			Total			Notes
N	P	Nat.	Name	Yellow card	Second yellow card	Red card	Yellow card	Second yellow card	Red card	Yellow card	Second yellow card	Red card	Yellow card	Second yellow card	Red card	Notes
21	RB	(Malaysia)	Helmi Remeli	5			1						6			
5	CB	(Cameroon)	Vincent Bikana	3			1			2			6			
16	LB	(Malaysia)	Zubir Azmi	3			1			1			5			
25	CM	(Malaysia)	Ismail Faruqi	2			1		1	1			4		1	
9	FW	(Brazil)	Paulo Rangel	1			2		1				3		1	
19	CB	(Malaysia)	Azlan Zainal	2			1	1					3	1		
8	CM	(Argentina)	Gustavo López	1			1		1	1			3		1	
12	RB	(Malaysia)	Hafizal Mohamad	1			1					1	2		1	
14	CM	(Malaysia)	Fakhrurazi Musa	2			1						3			
11	GK	(Malaysia)	Sharbinee Allawee	1			1			1			3			
44	RM	(Canada)	Issey Nakajima	2						1			3			
45	FW	(Malaysia)	Norshahrul Idlan	1								1	1		1	
23	FW	(Malaysia)	Manaf Mamat	2									2			
7	CM	(Malaysia)	Zairo Anuar	1			1						2			
13	CB	(Malaysia)	Hasmizan Kamarodin	2									2			
22	LM	(Malaysia)	Ashari Samsudin							1			1			
31	LM	(Malaysia)	Dhiyaulrahman							1			1			
20	CM	(Malaysia)	Sharin Sapien							1			1			

Last updated: 4 November 2015
Source: Competitive matches
Ordered by (red card) , (second yellow card) and (yellow card)
(yellow card) = Number of bookings; (second yellow card) = Number of sending offs after a second yellow card; (red card) = Number of sending offs by a direct red card.

== See also ==
- 2015 Malaysia Super League season
