= 2015 Felda United F.C. season =

Felda United
2015 season
- President: Hanapi Suhada
- Head Coach: Irfan Bakti Abu Salim
- Stadium: Selayang Stadium
- Super League: 5th
- FA Cup: Round of 32
- Malaysia Cup: Semi-finals
- Top goalscorer: League: Indra Putra Mahayuddin; Ndumba Makeche (6 goals); All: Thiago Augusto (13 goals)
- Highest home attendance: 11,396 vs Johor Darul Ta'zim (August 22, 2015)
- Lowest home attendance: 289 vs LionsXII (March 7, 2015)
- Average home league attendance: 2,754
Home colours	Away colours	Third colours

The 2015 season was Felda United's 9th competitive season and 5th consecutive season in the top flight of Malaysian football, Liga Super.

== Players ==
=== First-team squad ===
As of 1 December 2014

Note: Flags indicate national team as defined under FIFA eligibility rules; some limited exceptions apply. Players may hold more than one non-FIFA nationality.

No.	Pos.	Nation	Player
1	GK	(Malaysia) MAS	Fairul Azwan
3	DF	(Malaysia) MAS	Shahrul Saad
4	DF	(Serbia) SRB	Bojan Miladinović
5	DF	(Malaysia) MAS	Adib Aizuddin
6	DF	(Malaysia) MAS	Nasriq Baharom
7	DF	(Malaysia) MAS	Khairul Ismail
8	MF	(Malaysia) MAS	Shahrulnizam Mustapa
9	FW	(Australia) AUS	Ndumba Makeche
10	MF	(Liberia) LBR	Zah Rahan Krangar
11	MF	(Malaysia) MAS	Syamim Yahya
12	DF	(Malaysia) MAS	Shukor Adan (captain)
13	FW	(Malaysia) MAS	Abdul Latiff Suhaimi
14	MF	(Malaysia) MAS	Rasyid Aya

No.	Pos.	Nation	Player
17	MF	(Malaysia) MAS	Fauzan Dzulkifli
18	DF	(Malaysia) MAS	Aizulridzwan Razali
19	DF	(Malaysia) MAS	Firdaus Faudzi
21	GK	(Malaysia) MAS	Soffuan Tawil
22	FW	(Liberia) LBR	Edward Wilson
23	MF	(Malaysia) MAS	Indra Putra Mahayuddin
25	FW	(Malaysia) MAS	Ferris Danial
26	DF	(Malaysia) MAS	Hasni Zaidi
30	GK	(Malaysia) MAS	Farizal Harun
—	DF	(Malaysia) MAS	Qhairul Anwar
—	MF	(Malaysia) MAS	Syahid Zaidon
—	FW	(Malaysia) MAS	Arif Asin

=== Transfers ===
==== 1st leg ====
In: Note: Flags indicate national team as defined under FIFA eligibility rules; some limited exceptions apply. Players may hold more than one non-FIFA nationality.

No.	Pos.	Nation	Player
—	DF	(Malaysia) MAS	Shahrul Saad (from Harimau Muda A)
—	DF	(Malaysia) MAS	Farid Ramli (from youth)
—	DF	(Serbia) SRB	Bojan Miladinović (from (Uzbekistan) Pakhtakor Tashkent)
—	MF	(Malaysia) MAS	Fauzan Dzulkifli (from PKNS)
—	MF	(Malaysia) MAS	Firdaus Faudzi (from Sime Darby)
—	MF	(Malaysia) MAS	Rasyid Aya (from Sarawak)
—	FW	(Malaysia) MAS	Ferris Danial (from Harimau Muda A)

Out: Note: Flags indicate national team as defined under FIFA eligibility rules; some limited exceptions apply. Players may hold more than one non-FIFA nationality.

No.	Pos.	Nation	Player
—	DF	(Malaysia) MAS	Rahman Zabul (unattached)
—	DF	(Uzbekistan) UZB	Yaroslav Krushelnitsky (unattached)
—	DF	(Malaysia) MAS	Raimi Mohd Nor (loan return to Selangor)
—	MF	(Malaysia) MAS	K. Thanaraj (to Selangor)
—	MF	(Malaysia) MAS	Solehin Kanasian (to Kedah)
—	MF	(Malaysia) MAS	Asyraf Mohd Al Japri (unattached)
—	FW	(Malaysia) MAS	Haris Safwan (to Perak)

==== 2nd leg ====
In: Note: Flags indicate national team as defined under FIFA eligibility rules; some limited exceptions apply. Players may hold more than one non-FIFA nationality.

No.	Pos.	Nation	Player
33	MF	(Malaysia) MAS	Hadin Azman (from youth)
45	MF	(Malaysia) MAS	Christie Jayaseelan (from ATM)
49	FW	(Brazil) BRA	Thiago Augusto (from (Bahrain) Manama Club)

Out: Note: Flags indicate national team as defined under FIFA eligibility rules; some limited exceptions apply. Players may hold more than one non-FIFA nationality.

No.	Pos.	Nation	Player
—	FW	(Liberia) LBR	Edward Wilson (unattached)

== Competitions ==
=== Malaysia Super League ===
Date	Opponents	H / A	Result F–A	Scorers, Bookings	Attendance	League position
February 7, 2015	Sarawak	H	3–3	Miladinović 35', Makeche 46', Syamim (yellow card) 59', Wilson 84'	2,573	
February 14, 2015	Sime Darby	A	0–3	Shukor (yellow card) 7' (goal) 76', Syamim 11', Makeche 14', Indra Putra (yellow card) 85'	1,000	
February 21, 2015	ATM	H	2–1	Aizulridzwan (yellow card) 9', Wilson 14', Syamim 26', Hadin (yellow card) 87'	1,223	
March 7, 2015	LionsXII	H	0–0		289	
March 14, 2015	Kelantan	A	0–1	Hasni (yellow card) 6', Syamim (yellow card) 39', Wilson 61', Latiff (yellow card) 86'	19,000	
April 4, 2015	Perak	H	1–4	Miladinović (yellow card) 9', Shahrulnizam (yellow card) 42', Wilson 47' (yellow card) 51', Shukor (yellow card) 53', Zah Rahan (yellow card) 88', Aizulridzwan (yellow card) 90+2'	4,525	
April 11, 2015	PDRM	H	3–2	Syamim 28', Miladinović (yellow card) 36', Hasni (yellow card) 82', Makeche 86', Wilson 90+3'	585	
April 18, 2015	Terengganu	A	1–3	Syamim 19', Makeche 80', Zah Rahan 83', Firdaus (yellow card) 86'	7,000	
April 25, 2015	Pahang	H	0–1	Shahrulnizam (yellow card) 36', Jayaseelan (yellow card) 49'	3,200	
May 3, 2015	Johor Darul Ta'zim	A	1–0	Shukor (yellow card) 44', Indra Putra (yellow card) 45+1'	25,100	
June 20, 2015	Selangor	H	4–4	Thiago 17', 23', Hasni (red card) 45+1', Indra Putra 37', Makeche 49' (yellow card) 55', Farizal (yellow card) 76', Miladinović (yellow card) 86'	2,274	
June 23, 2015	Selangor	A	1–0	Syamim (yellow card) 27', Shahrulnizam (yellow card) 49', Makeche (yellow card) 90+1'	3,000	
June 27, 2015	Sarawak	A	0–2	Jayaseelan 11', Thiago 49', Makeche (yellow card) 65', Miladinović (yellow card) 70'	500	
July 4, 2015	Sime Darby	H	2–2	Shahrul (yellow card) 29', Zah Rahan 32', Hadin 83'	400	
July 8, 2015	ATM	A	0–4	Indra Putra 67', 83', 86', Zah Rahan 88'	400	
August 2, 2015	LionsXII	A	2–1	Indra Putra 13', Shukor (yellow card) 35', Ferris (yellow card) 57'	4,185	
August 5, 2015	Kelantan	H	0–0	Aizulridzwan (yellow card) 35'. Jayaseelan (yellow card) 42', Firdaus (yellow card) 70'	2,467	
August 8, 2015	Perak	A	0–2	Adib (yellow card) 58', Shukor 61', Raffi 69', Firdaus (yellow card) 89'	5,000	
August 11, 2015	PDRM	A	1–0	Syamim (yellow card) 87'	800	
August 15, 2015	Terengganu	H	1–0	Syamim (yellow card) 35', Adib (yellow card) 45+3', Makeche 58', Indra Putra (yellow card) 76'	1,361	
August 19, 2015	Pahang	A	2–2	Thiago 62', 69' (yellow card) 70', Shahrulnizam (yellow card) 90+3'	11,023	
August 22, 2015	Johor Darul Ta'zim	H	2–1	Shahrul 5', Indra Putra 11' (pen.) (yellow card) 28', Firdaus (yellow card) 23', Jayaseelan (yellow card) 34', Aizulridzwan (yellow card) 38'	11,396	

==== League table ====
Pos	Team	Pld	W	D	L	GF	GA	GD	Pts
3	Pahang	22	13	5	4	43	29	+14	38 (Note: Pahang was docked 6 points due to involvement in the delay in the process of solving the problem of salary and compensation by the former imports season 2013, Mohamed Borji.)
4	Terengganu	22	12	2	8	40	33	+7	38
5	Felda United	22	10	6	6	36	26	+10	36
6	PDRM	22	11	2	9	42	39	+3	35
7	LionsXII (Note: LionsXII are not eligible for any AFC competition spots)	22	9	6	7	36	32	+4	33

Source: FAM Official Site, Astro Arena
Rules for classification: 1) points; 2) goal difference; 3) number of goals scored

=== Malaysia FA Cup ===
==== Round of 32 ====
Date	Opponents	H / A	Result F–A	Scorers, Bookings	Attendance
February 28, 2015	Selangor	H	2–2 (a.e.t.) (2–4p)	Syamim (yellow card) 13', Shahrulnizam (yellow card) 36', Miladinović 47', Makeche 51', Aizulridzwan (yellow card) 63', Shukor (yellow card) 97'	7,328

=== Malaysia Cup ===
==== Group stage ====
Date	Opponents	H / A	Result F–A	Scorers, Bookings	Attendance
September 12, 2015	T–Team	H	3–0	Makeche 35', 69', Indra Putra 38' (pen.)	600
September 18, 2015	Kelantan	A	1–1	Aizulridzwan (yellow card) 53', Syamim 63'	10,413
September 26, 2015	Selangor	A	0–0	Shahrul (yellow card) 66', Aizulridzwan (yellow card) 74', Thiago (yellow card) 83'	5,273
October 3, 2015	T–Team	A	2–1	Zah Rahan 39', Firdaus (yellow card) 51', Farizal (yellow card) 61', Shukor (yellow card) 70', Syamim (yellow card) 89'	1,644
October 17, 2015	Kelantan	H	2–2	Jayaseelan (yellow card) 17', Thiago 18', 31', Shahrul (yellow card) 53', Aizulridzwan (yellow card) 74', Indra Putra (yellow card) 90+1'	2,477
November 4, 2015	Selangor	H	3–2	Thiago 49', 51', Cornthwaite 65' (o.g.), Fauzan (yellow card) 88'	1,886

Pos	Team	Pld	W	D	L	GF	GA	GD	Pts	Qualification	SEL	FEL	KEL	TTE
1	Selangor	6	3	1	2	6	7	−1	10	Advance to knockout phase	—	0–0	0–3	2–1
2	FELDA United	6	2	3	1	10	7	+3	9	Advance to knockout phase	3–2	—	2–2	3–0
3	Kelantan	6	2	2	2	10	8	+2	8		0–1	1–1	—	3–1
4	T–Team	6	2	0	4	7	11	−4	6		0–1	2–1	3–1	—

Source: FAM Astro Arena

==== Knockout phase ====
Date	Round	Opponents	H / A	Result F–A	Scorers, Bookings	Attendance
November 24, 2015	Quarter-finals; First leg	Johor Darul Ta'zim	H	1–1	Thiago 8', Miladinović (yellow card) 56', Aizulridzwan (yellow card) 59', Indra Putra (yellow card) 82'	3,799
November 28, 2015	Quarter-finals; Second leg	Johor Darul Ta'zim	A	1–2	Thiago 4', Zah Rahan 76', Jayaseelan (yellow card) 51', Indra Putra (yellow card) 74', Syamim (yellow card) 78', Hadin (yellow card) 90+2'	23,410
December 2, 2015	Semi-finals; First leg	Kedah	H	2–2	Thiago 14', 55', Firdaus (yellow card) 52', Aizulridzwan (yellow card) 67', Fauzan (yellow card) 74'	8,800
December 8, 2015	Semi-finals; Second leg	Kedah	A	2–1	Miladinović (yellow card) 1', Indra Putra (yellow card) 22', (red card) 69' Adib (yellow card) 30', Syamim 39',	30,000
