= 2015 Johor Darul Ta'zim F.C. season =

Johor Darul Ta'zim F.C.
2015 season
- President: Tunku Ismail Idris
- Manager: Dato' Haji Ismail Karim
- Head Coach: Bojan Hodak (Until 25 April); Mario Gómez (From 26 April)
- Stadium: Larkin Stadium
- Super League: 1st
- Charity Shield: Winners
- FA Cup: First round
- Malaysia Cup: Quarter-finals
- Champions League play-off: Preliminary round 2
- AFC Cup: Winners
- Top goalscorer: League: Luciano Figueroa (12); All: Luciano Figueroa (18)
- Biggest win: 5–0 vs Ayeyawady United (H), 27 May 2015, AFC Cup
- Biggest defeat: 1–4 vs Kelantan (A), 15 August 2015, Super League
Home colours	Away colours	Third colours

The 2015 season is Johor Darul Ta'zim Football Club's 43rd season in club history and 3th season in the Malaysia Super League after rebranding their name from Johor FC. This season was most notable for JDT winning the 2015 AFC Cup, becoming the first Malaysian and Southeast Asian club to win a major Asian continental title.

The season was also marked by the club’s return to Asian competition after a six-season absence. They qualified for the tournament after finishing as champions of the Malaysia Super League.

== Season overview ==

Johor Darul Ta'zim's 2015 starting lineup

The 2015 season was a historic one for Johor Darul Ta'zim, as the club retained the Malaysia Super League title and became the first Malaysian club to win the AFC Cup.

=== Super League ===
JDT began their Malaysia Super League campaign on 31 January and concluded it on 22 August, finishing as champions with 46 points from 22 matches, recording 14 wins, 4 draws, and 4 defeats, with 36 goals scored and 18 conceded for a goal difference of +18. The title was JDT's second consecutive Malaysia Super League crown, cementing their status as the dominant force in Malaysian football following their maiden triumph in 2014. A notable league result included a 3–1 win over rivals Selangor on 13 July, underlining JDT's superiority at the top of the table.

=== FA Cup ===
In contrast to their league success, JDT's Malaysia FA Cup campaign was brief and disappointing. Entering in the first round, JDT were drawn away to Pahang on 2 March, where the match ended 1–1 after extra time. Pahang advanced 4–2 on penalties, eliminating JDT at the earliest possible stage and denying the club any chance of challenging for the cup. The first-round exit stood in stark contrast to JDT's dominance in the league and their eventual continental triumph later that year.

=== Malaysia Cup ===
The Malaysia Cup offered JDT a chance to complete a domestic double, and the team progressed through the group stage before defeating ATM FA 7–2 on aggregate in the quarter-finals, including a 4–0 win in the second leg. However, JDT's cup run ultimately ended in the knockout stages, as Selangor went on to lift the trophy, defeating Kedah 2–0 in the final on 12 December at the Shah Alam Stadium. Despite falling short domestically in the cup, JDT's league title and continental success made 2015 a season of major achievement for the club.

=== AFC Cup ===
JDT made their return to the AFC Cup for the first time since the 2009 AFC Cup, marking the club's comeback to the competition after a six-year absence. Drawn into Group F alongside Hong Kong side Kitchee, Singaporean debutantes Balestier Khalsa, and Indian club East Bengal, JDT opened their campaign with a 4–1 win over East Bengal on 24 February, before going on to top the group with 5 wins and 1 defeat from 6 matches, scoring 11 goals and conceding 3 for a goal difference of +8. In the knockout stages, JDT defeated Myanmar's Ayeyawady United 2–1 on aggregate in the zonal semi-final, before overcoming Hong Kong's South China 4–2 on aggregate in the zonal final. JDT then advanced past Kuwaiti side Al-Qadsia in the inter-zone final to reach the tournament's final. In the final, played at the Pamir Stadium in Dushanbe, Tajikistan, on 31 October, JDT defeated Tajikistani side Istiklol 1–0, with Leandro Velázquez scoring the only goal, to become the first Malaysian club to win the AFC Cup.

== Squads ==
=== First team Squad ===
No.	Name	Nationality	Position(s)	Join	Date of Birth (Age)	Signed from
Goalkeepers
1	Farizal Marlias	(Malaysia)	GK	2015	29 June 1986 (age 40)	(Malaysia) Selangor
22	Al-Hafiz Hamzah	(Malaysia)	GK	2013	15 March 1984 (age 42)	(Malaysia) USM FC
24	Izham Tarmizi	(Malaysia)	GK	2013	24 April 1991 (age 35)	(Malaysia) Harimau Muda
Defenders
7	Aidil Zafuan	(Malaysia)	CB, RB	2013	3 August 1987 (aged 27)	(Malaysia) ATM FA
4	Asraruddin Putra Omar	(Malaysia)	LB, CB	2014	25 March 1988 (aged 26)	(Malaysia) Selangor
6	Marcos António	(Brazil)	CB	2014	25 May 1983 (aged 31)	(Germany) 1. FC Nürnberg
15	Daudsu Jamaluddin	(Malaysia)	RB / LB	2014	18 March 1985 (aged 29)	(Malaysia) Kelantan FA
18	Mahali Jasuli	(Malaysia)	RB, RW	2014	2 April 1989 (aged 25)	(Malaysia) Selangor
26	Amer Saidin	(Malaysia)	CB	2015	25 July 1992 (aged 22)	(Malaysia) Harimau Muda A
27	Fadhli Shas	(Malaysia)	CB / LB	2014	21 January 1991 (aged 23)	(Malaysia) Harimau Muda A
33	Fazly Mazlan	(Malaysia)	LB	2013	22 December 1993 (aged 21)	(Malaysia) Johor FA
Midfielders
5	Amirul Hadi Zainal	(Malaysia)	AM, RW	2014	27 May 1986 (aged 28)	(Malaysia) Pahang FA
8	Safiq Rahim	(Malaysia)	CM	2013	5 July 1987 (aged 27)	(Malaysia) Selangor
11	Patito Rodríguez	(Argentina)	LW	2015	4 May 1990 (aged 24)	(Brazil) Santos
12	S. Kunanlan	(Malaysia)	RW, LW / CM	2015	15 September 1986 (aged 28)	(Malaysia) Selangor FA
13	Gary Steven Robbat	(Malaysia)	CM / CM	2015	3 September 1992 (aged 22)	(Malaysia) Harimau Muda
14	Hariss Harun	(Singapore)	CM / CB	2014	19 November 1990 (aged 24)	(Singapore) LionsXII
16	Shakir Shaari	(Malaysia)	DM	2014	23 September 1986 (aged 28)	(Malaysia) Kelantan FA
20	Nazrin Nawi	(Malaysia)	LW	2014	7 February 1988 (aged 26)	(Malaysia) Negeri Sembilan
21	Jasazrin Jamaluddin	(Malaysia)	CM	2012	3 April 1986 (aged 28)	(Malaysia) Johor FA
23	S. Chanturu	(Malaysia)	RW / ST	2015	14 December 1987 (aged 27)	(Malaysia) Sarawak FA
25	Junior Eldstål	(Malaysia) (Sweden)	CM / DM	2015	16 September 1991 (aged 23)	(Malaysia) Sarawak FA
9	Leandro Velázquez	(Argentina)	AM	2015	10 May 1989 (aged 25)	(Malaysia) Johor FA
Forwards
42	Jorge Pereyra Díaz	(Argentina)	ST	2014	5 August 1990 (aged 24)	(Argentina) Club Atlético Lanús
9	Alhaji Kamara	(Sierra Leone)	ST	2015	16 April 1994 (aged 20)	(Sweden) IFK Norrköping
10	Safee Sali	(Malaysia)	ST	2013	29 January 1984 (aged 30)	(Indonesia) Pelita Jaya
17	Amri Yahya	(Malaysia)	ST / AM	2014	21 January 1981 (aged 33)	(Malaysia) Selangor
19	Luciano Figueroa	(Argentina)	ST	2014	19 May 1981 (aged 33)	(Greece) Panathinaikos

== Transfer ==
=== In ===
Date	Pos.	Name	From	Fee
1 November 2014	DF	(Malaysia) S. Chanturu	Sarawak FA	Undisclosed Fee
1 November 2014	GK	(Malaysia) Farizal Marlias	Selangor FA	Undisclosed Fee
1 November 2014	MF	(Malaysia) S. Kunanlan	Selangor FA	Undisclosed Fee
11 November 2014	MF	(Malaysia) Junior Eldstål	Sarawak FA	Undisclosed Fee
19 November 2014	MF	(Malaysia) Mohd Fandi Othman	(Malaysia) Harimau Muda A	None
19 November 2014	MF	(Malaysia) Mohd Amer Saidin	(Malaysia) Harimau Muda A	None
20 March 2015	FW	(Argentina) Patricio Julian Rodríguez	(Brazil) Santos FC	Season loan
25 March 2015	FW	(Sierra Leone) Alhaji Kamara	(Sweden) IFK Norrköping	Season loan
1 April 2015	MF	(Malaysia) Gary Steven Robbat	(Malaysia) Harimau Muda A	None
23 July 2015	FW	(Argentina) Leandro Velázquez	(Malaysia) Johor Darul Ta'zim II F.C.	Registered for AFC Cup only

=== Out ===
Date	Pos.	Name	To	Fee
4 November 2014	FW	(Malaysia) Norshahrul Idlan Talaha	ATM FA	End of contract
7 November 2014	DF	(Malaysia) Azizi Matt Rose	Negeri Sembilan FA	End of contract
7 November 2014	MF	(Malaysia) Nurul Azwan Roya	PDRM FA	End of contract
15 November 2014	GK	(Malaysia) Norazlan Razali	Selangor FA	End of contract
15 November 2014	DF	(Malaysia) S. Subramaniam	Selangor FA	End of contract
16 May 2015	FW	(Sierra Leone) Alhaji Kamara	(Sweden) IFK Norrköping	End of loan season
12 July 2015	FW	(Argentina) Jorge Pereyra Díaz	(Argentina) Club Atlético Independiente	4 months loan until 30 Nov 2015
23 July 2015	FW	(Argentina) Patricio Julian Rodriguez	(Brazil) Santos FC	End of loan season

== Pre-season And Friendlies ==
16 Dec 2014 Friendly	Johor Darul Ta'zim (Malaysia)	1 – 0	(Malaysia) Johor Darul Ta'zim II	Johor Bahru, Johor
20:45 UTC+08:00	Nazrin Nawi 43'			Stadium: Padang Seri Gelam

23 Dec 2014 Friendly	Johor Darul Ta'zim (Malaysia)	1 – 0	(Malaysia) PKNS	Johor Bahru, Johor
20:45 UTC+08:00	Sean Giannelli 47'			Stadium: Padang Seri Gelam

26 Dec 2014 Friendly	Penang (Malaysia)	1 – 1	(Malaysia) Johor Darul Ta'zim	George Town, Penang
20:45 UTC+08:00	Hilton Moreira 14'		Amirulhadi Zainal 16'	Stadium: City Stadium

5 Jan 2015 Friendly	Palestine	4 – 1	(Malaysia) Johor Darul Ta'zim	Sydney, New South Wales
20:00 UTC+08:00	Pal1; Pal2; Pal3; Pal4		Pal5 o.g.	Stadium: Marconi Stadium

6 Jan 2015 Friendly	Uzbekistan	4 – 1	(Malaysia) Johor Darul Ta'zim	Sydney, New South Wales
20:00 UTC+08:00	Uzb1 20'; Uzb2 65'; Uzb3 80'; Uzb4 85'		Mohd Shakir Shaari 70'	Stadium: Marconi Stadium

8 Jan 2015 Friendly	Bentleigh Greens SC (Australia)	1 – 1	(Malaysia) Johor Darul Ta'zim	Cheltenham, Melbourne
20:00 UTC+08:00	Luke Pilkington 8'		Mohd Amri Yahyah 69'	Stadium: Kingston Heath Soccer Complex

9 Jan 2015 Friendly	Dandenong Thunder SC (Australia)	2 – 2	(Malaysia) Johor Darul Ta'zim	Dandenong, Victoria
20:00 UTC+08:00	Abd Rahman 61'; Alan Kearney 70'		Luciano Figueroa 51' pen S. Chanturu 52'	Stadium: George Andrews Reserve

17 Jan 2015 Friendly	Johor Darul Ta'zim (Malaysia)	2 – 0	(Singapore) Young Lions	Johor Bahru, Johor
20:45 UTC+08:00	Luciano Figueroa 30'; Nazrin Nawi 55'			Stadium: Padang Seri Gelam

20 Jan 2015 Friendly	Johor Darul Ta'zim (Malaysia)	4 – 0	(Malaysia) Johor Darul Ta'zim III	Johor Bahru, Johor
20:45 UTC+08:00	Mohd Amri Yahyah 13'; Hazwan 20' o.g. Safiq Rahim 75' 78'			Stadium: Padang Seri Gelam

24 Jan 2015 Friendly	Johor Darul Ta'zim (Malaysia)	4 – 1	(Singapore) Tampines Rovers	Johor Bahru, Johor
20:45 UTC+08:00	Jorge Pereyra Díaz 14' 22'; Nazrin Nawi 26'; Junior Eldstål 32'	(HT 4-0)	Siddiq Durimi 67'	Stadium: Tan Sri Dato Haji Hassan Yunos Stadium

9 July 2015 Friendly	Johor Darul Ta'zim (Malaysia)	1 – 6	(Germany) Borussia Dortmund	Johor Bahru, Johor
21:45 UTC+08:00	Gary Steven Robbat 39'	(HT 1-3)	İlkay Gündoğan 22'; Pierre-Emerick Aubameyang 29'; Kevin Kampl 32'; Shinji Kagawa 74'; Jeremy Dudziak 82'; Marco Reus 90'	Stadium: Tan Sri Dato Haji Hassan Yunos Stadium

== Competitions ==
=== Overview ===
Competition	First match	Last match	Starting round	Final position	Record							
Competition	First match	Last match	Starting round	Final position	Pld	W	D	L	GF	GA	GD	Win %
Malaysia Super League (Note: Includes the Charity Shield.)	31 January 2015	22 August 2015	Matchday 1	Winners	22	14	4	4	36	18	+18	63.64
Malaysia FA Cup	2 March 2015		First round	First round	1	0	1	0	1	1	+0	0.00
Malaysia Cup	11 September 2015	28 November 2015	Group stage	Quarter-finals	8	5	2	1	17	7	+10	62.50
AFC Champions League	4 February 2015	10 February 2015	Preliminary round 1	Preliminary round 2	2	1	0	1	2	4	−2	50.00
AFC Cup	24 February 2015	31 October 2015	Group stage	Winners	11	8	1	2	22	8	+14	72.73
Total					44	28	8	8	78	38	+40	63.64

Last updated: 28 November 2015
Source: Competitions

=== League table ===
Pos	Team	Pld	W	D	L	GF	GA	GD	Pts	Qualification or relegation
1	Johor Darul Ta'zim (C)	22	14	4	4	36	18	+18	46	Qualification to AFC Champions League qualifying preliminary round 2
2	Selangor	22	11	6	5	43	28	+15	39	Qualification to AFC Cup group stage (Note: Since Lions XII, who won the 2015 Piala FA, are a side managed by the Football Association of Singapore and thus ineligible to represent Malaysia in continental competition, the 2015 Liga Super runners-up will be chosen to represent Malaysia in the AFC Cup.)
3	Pahang	22	13	5	4	43	29	+14	38 (Note: Pahang was docked 6 points due to involvement in the delay in the process of solving the problem of salary and compensation by the former imports season 2013, Mohamed Borji.)	
4	Terengganu	22	12	2	8	40	33	+7	38	
5	Felda United	22	10	6	6	36	26	+10	36	

Source: FAM Official Site, Astro Arena
Rules for classification: 1) points; 2) goal difference; 3) number of goals scored
(C) Champions
Notes:

Win Draw Lose

31 Jan 2015 1	Johor Darul Ta'zim	2 – 0	Pahang	Johor Bahru, Johor
20:45 UTC+08:00	Marcos Antonio 36' (yellow card) 71'; Mahali Jasuli (yellow card) 44'; Luciano Figueroa 58'			Stadium: Tan Sri Dato Hj Hassan Yunos Stadium; Attendance: 21,618; Referee: Mohd Amirul Izwan Yaakob (Perak)

14 Feb 2015 2	PDRM	1 – 0	Johor Darul Ta'zim	Shah Alam, Selangor
20:45 UTC+08:00	Mohamadou Sumareh 75'		Junior Eldstål (yellow card) 49'; Luciano Figueroa (yellow card) 79'	Stadium: Shah Alam Stadium; Attendance: 4,500; Referee: Suhaizi Shukri (Malacca)

21 Feb 2015 3	Selangor	1 – 1	Johor Darul Ta'zim	Shah Alam, Selangor
20:45 UTC+08:00	Andik Vermansyah 1'		Hariss Harun (yellow card) 23'; Safiq Rahim (yellow card) 34'; Luciano Figueroa 63'; Marcos Antonio (yellow card) 86'	Stadium: Shah Alam Stadium; Attendance: 25,000; Referee: Samsuddin Ibrahim (Terengganu)

7 Mar 2015 4	Johor Darul Ta'zim	2 – 1	Sarawak	Johor Bahru, Johor
20:45 UTC+08:00	Safiq Rahim 40', 42'; Fadhli Shas (yellow card) 57'		Billy Mehmet 27'	Stadium: Tan Sri Dato Hj Hassan Yunos Stadium; Attendance: 19,430; Referee: Mohd Amirul Izwan Yaakob (Perak)

14 Mar 2015 5	Sime Darby	1 – 1	Johor Darul Ta'zim	Batu Caves, Selangor
20:45 UTC+08:00	Nazrul Kamaruzaman 34'		Junior Eldstål 61'; Hariss Harun (yellow card) 90'	Stadium: Selayang Stadium; Attendance: 4,675; Referee: Mohd Nazmi Nasaruddin (Penang)

4 Apr 2015 6	Johor Darul Ta'zim	2 – 1	ATM	Johor Bahru, Johor
20:45 UTC+08:00	Mohd Amri Yahyah 32'; Safiq Rahim 58'; Mohd Shakir Shaari (yellow card) 74'; Marcos Antonio (yellow card) 78'		Jerry Palacios 23'	Stadium: Tan Sri Dato Hj Hassan Yunos Stadium; Attendance: 15,950; Referee: Syed Azhar Syed Kamar (Kuala Lumpur)

11 Apr 2015 7	LionsXII	0 – 0	Johor Darul Ta'zim	Kallang, Singapore
19:45 UTC+08:00			Mohd Shakir Shaari (yellow card) 43'	Stadium: Jalan Besar Stadium; Attendance: 7,000; Referee: Suhaizi Shukri (Malacca)

18 Apr 2015 8	Johor Darul Ta'zim	3 – 1	Kelantan	Johor Bahru, Johor
20:45 UTC+08:00	Hariss Harun 18'; Alhaji Kamara 23'; Mohd Shakir Shaari (yellow card) 38'; Mohd Amri Yahyah 42'; Fadhli Shas (yellow card) 54'; Marcos Antonio (yellow card) 76'		Austin Amutu 10'	Stadium: Tan Sri Dato Hj Hassan Yunos Stadium; Attendance: 21,100; Referee: Lismotia Mohen Mohd Tisan (Negeri Sembilan)

24 Apr 2015 9	Perak	2 – 1	Johor Darul Ta'zim	Ipoh, Perak
20:45 UTC+08:00	Nurridzuan Abu Hassan 48'; Charles Chad Souza 50'		Junior Eldstål 24'; Safiq Rahim (yellow card) 64'; Safee Sali (yellow card) 85'	Stadium: Perak Stadium; Attendance: 20,000; Referee: Suhaizi Shukri (Malacca)

3 May 2015 10	Johor Darul Ta'zim	1 – 0	Felda United	Johor Bahru, Johor
20:45 UTC+08:00	Marcos Antonio (yellow card) 38'; Patito Rodríguez 45+1' pen Mohd Amri Yahyah (yellow card) 63'; Patito Rodríguez (yellow card) 90+4'			Stadium: Tan Sri Dato Hj Hassan Yunos Stadium; Attendance: 25,100; Referee: Samsuddin Ibrahim (Terengganu)

20 June 2015 11	Terengganu	0 – 1	Johor Darul Ta'zim	Kuala Terengganu, Terengganu
21:45 UTC+08:00			Luciano Figueroa 77'; Mahali Jasuli (yellow card) 80'	Stadium: Sultan Ismail Nasiruddin Shah Stadium; Attendance: 0 Referee: Suhaizi Shukri (Malacca)

23 June 2015 12	Johor Darul Ta'zim	2 – 0	Terengganu	Johor Bahru, Johor
21:45 UTC+08:00	Aidil Zafuan 45+2'; Luciano Figueroa 90+2'			Stadium: Tan Sri Dato Hj Hassan Yunos Stadium; Referee: Lismotia Mohen Mohd Tisan (Negeri Sembilan)

27 June 2015 13	Pahang	1 – 1	Johor Darul Ta'zim	Kuantan, Pahang
21:45 UTC+08:00	Dickson Nwakaeme 69'		Mohd Amri Yahyah 66'	Stadium: Darulmakmur Stadium; Referee: Mohd Amirul Izwan Yaakob (Perak)

4 July 2015 14	Johor Darul Ta'zim	2 – 1	PDRM	Johor Bahru, Johor
21:45 UTC+08:00	Safiq Rahim 4', 57'; Mohd Amri Yahyah (yellow card) 85'		Dramane Traore 82' pen	Stadium: Tan Sri Dato Hj Hassan Yunos Stadium; Referee: Nagor Amir Mohammad Noor (Penang)

15 July 2015 15	Johor Darul Ta'zim	3 – 1	Selangor	Johor Bahru, Johor
20:45 UTC+08:00	Mohd Amri Yahyah 11'; Nazrin Nawi (yellow card) 23'; Jasazrin Jamaluddin (yellow card) 30'; Safiq Rahim (yellow card) 34'; Luciano Figueroa 45+2', 79'; S. Kunanlan (yellow card) 87'		Andik Vermansyah 45+1'	Stadium: Tan Sri Dato Hj Hassan Yunos Stadium; Referee: Samsuddin Ibrahim (Terengganu)

1 Aug 2015 16	Sarawak	0 – 2	Johor Darul Ta'zim	Kuching, Sarawak
20:45 UTC+08:00			Mohd Amri Yahyah 63'; Luciano Figueroa 90' (yellow card) 62'	Stadium: Sarawak Stadium; Referee: Syed Azhar Syed Kamar (Kuala Lumpur)

5 Aug 2015 17	Johor Darul Ta'zim	4 – 0	Sime Darby	Johor Bahru, Johor
20:45 UTC+08:00	Luciano Figueroa 30', 69'; Asraruddin Putra Omar 45+2'; Safiq Rahim 49'			Stadium: Tan Sri Dato Hj Hassan Yunos Stadium; Referee: Mohd Zohri Tajuddin (Malacca)

8 Aug 2015 18	ATM	0 – 1	Johor Darul Ta'zim	Paroi, Negeri Sembilan
20:45 UTC+08:00			Safee Sali 71'	Stadium: Tuanku Abdul Rahman Stadium; Referee: Suhaizi Shukri (Malacca)

12 Aug 2015 19	Johor Darul Ta'zim	1 – 0	LionsXII	Johor Bahru, Johor
20:45 UTC+08:00	Luciano Figueroa 55'; Nazrin Nawi (yellow card) 60'; Mohd Farizal Marlias (yellow card) 83'; Aidil Zafuan (yellow card) 89'			Stadium: Tan Sri Dato Hj Hassan Yunos Stadium; Referee: Mohd Amirul Izwan Yaakob (Perak)

15 Aug 2015 20	Kelantan	4 – 1	Johor Darul Ta'zim	Kota Bharu, Kelantan
20:45 UTC+08:00	Gilmar 4', 83'; Mohd Badhri Mohd Radzi 13' pen Mohd Nor Farhan Muhammad 52'		Marcos Antonio (yellow card) 11'; Aidil Zafuan (yellow card) 45+2'; Mahali Jasuli 50'	Stadium: Sultan Muhammad IV Stadium; Referee: Mohd Nazmi Nasaruddin (Penang)

19 Aug 2015 21	Johor Darul Ta'zim	4 – 1	Perak	Johor Bahru, Johor
20:45 UTC+08:00	Luciano Figueroa 44'; Nazrin Nawi 48'; S. Chanturu 66'; Safiq Rahim 71'; S. Kunanlan (yellow card) 85'		Thiago Junior Aquino 60'	Stadium: Tan Sri Dato Hj Hassan Yunos Stadium; Referee: Syed Azhar Syed Kamar (Kuala Lumpur)

22 Aug 2015 22	Felda United	2 – 1	Johor Darul Ta'zim	Batu Caves, Selangor
20:45 UTC+08:00	Shahrul Mohd Saad 4'; Indra Putra Mahayuddin 11' pen	(HT 2-1)	Junior Eldstål (red card); Luciano Figueroa 35' pen S. Kunanlan (yellow card) 90+1'	Stadium: Selayang Stadium; Referee: Samsuddin Ibrahim (Terengganu)

=== Malaysia FA Cup ===
Win Draw Lose

==== First round ====
2 Mar 2015 First round	Pahang	1 – 1 (4 – 2 p)	Johor Darul Ta'zim	Kuantan, Pahang
20:45 UTC+08:00	Matias Conti 20' 48'		Jasazrin Jamaluddin (yellow card) 28'; Asraruddin Putra Omar (yellow card) 45+1'; Safee Sali 54'; S. Kunanlan (yellow card) 75'; Hariss Harun 80'	Stadium: Darulmakmur Stadium; Attendance: 21,970; Referee: Wan Tarmizi Wan Ibrahim (Selangor)
	Penalties
	Conti (penalty scored); Stewart (penalty scored); Zesh Rehman (penalty scored); Razman (penalty scored)		(penalty missed) Figueroa; (penalty scored) Safee; (penalty scored) Hariss; (penalty missed) Eldstal

=== Malaysia Cup ===
==== Group stages ====
Pos	Team	Pld	W	D	L	GF	GA	GD	Pts		JDT	SAR	ATM	PER
1	Johor Darul Ta'zim	6	5	1	0	15	4	+11	16	Advance to knockout phase	—	1–1	4–0	2–0
2	Sarawak	6	2	2	2	5	7	−2	8	Advance to knockout phase	0–3	—	1–0	1–0
3	ATM	6	2	1	3	10	13	−3	7		2–3	2–2	—	4–3
4	Perak	6	1	0	5	5	11	−6	3		1–2	1–0	0–2	—

Source: FAM Astro Arena

Win Draw Lose

11 Sept 2015 Matchday 1	Johor Darul Ta'zim	2 – 0	Perak	Johor Bahru, Johor
20:45 UTC+08:00	Gary Steven Robbat 13'; Safee Sali 17'; S. Chanturu 21'			Stadium: Tan Sri Dato Hj Hassan Yunos Stadium; Attendance: 18710; Referee: Syed Azhar Syed Kamar (Kuala Lumpur)

19 Sept 2015 Matchday 2	ATM	2 – 3	Johor Darul Ta'zim	Paroi, Negeri Sembilan
20:45 UTC+08:00	Abdulafees Abdulsalam 68'		Marcos Antonio (yellow card) 9'; Mahali Jasuli 27'; Safiq Rahim 27' 51'; S. Chanturu (yellow card) 76'; S. Kunanlan (yellow card) 90+1'; Mohd Amer Saidin (red card)	Stadium: Tuanku Abdul Rahman Stadium; Attendance: 4811; Referee: S Sitharajan (Sabah)

17 Oct 2015 Matchday 3	Johor Darul Ta'zim	4 – 0	ATM	Johor Bahru, Johor
20:45 UTC+08:00	S. Chanturu 11'; Safiq Rahim 24'; Luciano Figueroa 36' 41'; Nazrin Nawi 70'		Abdulafees Abdulsalam 90+3' pen	Stadium: Tan Sri Dato Hj Hassan Yunos Stadium; Attendance: 13360; Referee: Suhaizi Shukri (Malacca)

24 Oct 2015 Matchday 4	Sarawak	0 – 3	Johor Darul Ta'zim	Kuching, Sarawak
20:45 UTC+08:00			Safee Sali 15' pen Hariss Harun 83'; Safiq Rahim 90'	Stadium: Sarawak Stadium; Attendance: 6030; Referee: Syed Azhar Syed Kamar (Kuala Lumpur)

5 Nov 2015 Matchday 5	Perak	1 – 2	Johor Darul Ta'zim	Ipoh, Perak
20:45 UTC+08:00	Charles Souza Chad 29' 89'		Mohd Amri Yahyah 32'; Safee Sali 45+2'	Stadium: Perak Stadium; Attendance: 5339; Referee: Zulkifli Ahmad (Kuala Lumpur)

21 Nov 2015 Matchday 6	Johor Darul Ta'zim	1 – 1	Sarawak	Johor Bahru, Johor
20:45 UTC+08:00	Mohd Amirul Hadi Zainal 37'; Safiq 60' 90+1'		Patrick Nyema Gerhardt 48'	Stadium: Tan Sri Dato Hj Hassan Yunos Stadium; Attendance: 14985; Referee: Zohri Tajudin (Malacca)

==== Quarter-finals ====
24 Nov 2015 QF 1st leg	Felda United	1 – 1	Johor Darul Ta'zim	Batu Caves, Selangor
20:45 UTC+08:00	Thiago Augusto Fernandes 8'; Zah Rahan Krangar 41'		Safiq Rahim 45+1'; Mohd Amirul Hadi Zainal 90+3'	Stadium: Selayang Stadium; Referee: Mohd Amirul Izwan Yaakob (Perak)

28 Nov 2015 QF 2nd leg	Johor Darul Ta'zim	1 – 2 (2 – 3 agg.)	Felda United	Johor Bahru, Johor
20:45 UTC+08:00	Fazly (red card)		Thiago Augusto Fernandes 90+2' pen	Stadium: Tan Sri Dato Haji Hassan Yunos Stadium

=== AFC Champions League ===
4 Feb 2015 Play-off (Round 1)	Johor Darul Ta'zim (Malaysia)	2 – 1	(India) Bengaluru	Johor Bahru, Johor
20:45 UTC+08:00	Amirul Hadi Zainal (yellow card) 17'; Hariss Harun 47'; S. Chanturu 96'	(HT 0-0)	Eugeneson Lyngdoh 90'	Stadium: Tan Sri Dato Haji Hassan Yunos Stadium; Attendance: 17,454; Referee: Yudai Yamamoto (Japan)

10 Feb 2015 Play-off (Round 2)	Bangkok Glass (Thailand)	3 – 0	(Malaysia) Johor Darul Ta'zim FC	Thanyaburi, Pathum Thani
20:00 UTC+08:00	Narong Jansawek 28'; Lazarus Kaimbi 52' 62'	(HT 1-0)	Nazrin Nawi (yellow card) 19'; Fadhli Shas (yellow card) 64'	Stadium: Leo Stadium; Attendance: 5,299; Referee: Chris Beath (Australia)

=== AFC Cup ===
Pos	Team	Pld	W	D	L	GF	GA	GD	Pts	Qualification	JDT	KIT	EBG	BAL
1	(Malaysia) Johor Darul Ta'zim	6	5	0	1	11	3	+8	15	Advance to knockout stage	—	2–0	4–1	3–0
2	(Hong Kong) Kitchee	6	3	2	1	10	6	+4	11	Advance to knockout stage	2–0	—	2–2	3–0
3	(India) East Bengal	6	1	2	3	8	10	−2	5		0–1	1–1	—	3–0
4	(Singapore) Balestier Khalsa	6	1	0	5	3	13	−10	3		0–1	1–2	2–1	—

Source: AFC

==== Group stage ====
24 Feb 2015 Matchday 1	Johor Darul Ta'zim FC (Malaysia)	4 – 1	(India) East Bengal FC	Johor Bahru, Johor
20:45 UTC+08:00	Nazrin Nawi 9'; Safiq Rahim 38' pen S. Chanturu 48'; Safee Sali 54'; Hariss Harun (yellow card) 79'	(HT 2-1)	Ranti Martins 35'	Stadium: Tan Sri Dato Haji Hassan Yunos Stadium; Attendance: 12,212; Referee: Sivakorn Pu-Udom (Thailand)

10 Mar 2015 Matchday 2	Balestier Khalsa FC (Singapore)	0 – 1	(Malaysia) Johor Darul Ta'zim FC	Kallang, Singapore
19:30 UTC+08:00		(HT 0-0)	Junior Eldstål (yellow card) 64'; Asraruddin Putra Omar 90+3'; Hariss Harun (yellow card) 90+4'	Stadium: Jalan Besar Stadium; Attendance: 2,180; Referee: Abdul Rahman Ibrahim J Al-Jassim (Qatar)

17 Mar 2015 Matchday 3	Kitchee SC (Hong Kong)	2 – 0	(Malaysia) Johor Darul Ta'zim FC	Kowloon, Hong Kong
20:00 UTC+08:00	Juan Belencoso 27'; Jordi Tarrés 35'	(HT 0-0)	Mohd Amri Yahyah (yellow card) 29'; Fadhli Shas (yellow card) 55'	Stadium: Mong Kok Stadium; Attendance: 2,217; Referee: Vo Minh Tri (Vietnam)

14 Apr 2015 Matchday 4	Johor Darul Ta'zim FC (Malaysia)	2 – 0	(Hong Kong) Kitchee SC	Johor Bahru, Johor
20:45 UTC+08:00	Luciano Figueroa 17'; Safiq Rahim 44' pen	(HT 2-0)		Stadium: Tan Sri Dato Haji Hassan Yunos Stadium; Attendance: 10,154; Referee: Wang Di (China)

28 Apr 2015 Matchday 5	East Bengal FC (India)	0 – 1	(Malaysia) Johor Darul Ta'zim FC	Kolkata, India
18:00 UTC+08:00		(HT 0-1)	Mohd Amri Yahyah 6'; Mohd Farizal Marlias (yellow card) 42'	Stadium: Salt Lake Stadium; Attendance: 100; Referee: Nivon Robesh Gamini (Sri Lanka)

12 May 2015 Matchday 6	Johor Darul Ta'zim FC (Malaysia)	3 – 0	(Singapore) Balestier Khalsa FC	Johor Bahru, Johor
20:45 UTC+08:00	Fadhli Shas (yellow card) 63'; Mohd Farizal Marlias (yellow card) 67'; Safee Sali 76'; Safiq Rahim 85'; Luciano Figueroa 90' (yellow card) 85'	(HT 0-0)		Stadium: Tan Sri Dato Haji Hassan Yunos Stadium; Attendance: 10,110; Referee: Kimura Hiroyuki (Japan)

==== Knock-out stage ====
Round of 16
(Iraq) Al-Shorta	0
Al-Kuwait	2
(Indonesia) Persib Bandung	0
(Hong Kong) Kitchee	2
(Tajikistan) Istiklol (pen.)	1(4)
(Syria) Al-Wahda	1(2)
(Indonesia) Persipura Jayapura	0
(Malaysia) Pahang (awd.)	3
(Jordan) Al-Wehdat	0
(Kuwait) Al-Qadsia	1
(Syria) Al-Jaish	1
(Jordan) Al-Jazeera	0
(Malaysia) Johor Darul Ta'zim	5
(Myanmar) Ayeyawady United	0
(Hong Kong) South China	2
(India) Bengaluru	0

Quarter-finals
Al-Kuwait	6	1	7
(Hong Kong) Kitchee	0	1	1
(Tajikistan) Istiklol	4	1	5
(Malaysia) Pahang	0	3	3
(Kuwait) Al-Qadsia	3	0	3
(Syria) Al-Jaish	0	2	2
(Malaysia) Johor Darul Ta'zim	1	3	4
(Hong Kong) South China	1	1	2

Semi-finals
Al-Kuwait	4	—	—
(Tajikistan) Istiklol (w/o)	0	—	—
(Kuwait) Al-Qadsia	3	—	—
(Malaysia) Johor Darul Ta'zim (w/o)	1	—	—

Final
(Tajikistan) Istiklol	0
(Malaysia) Johor Darul Ta'zim	1

===== Round of 16 =====
27 May 2015 Round of 16	Johor Darul Ta'zim FC (Malaysia)	5 – 0	(Myanmar) Ayeyawady United	Johor Bahru, Johor
20:45 UTC+08:00	Safiq Rahim 2'; Luciano Figueroa 46' 90+1'; Jorge Pereyra Díaz 61' 74' (yellow card) 36'	(HT 1-0)		Stadium: Tan Sri Dato Haji Hassan Yunos Stadium; Attendance: 16,850; Referee: Jameel Juma Abdulhusain (Bahrain)

===== Quarter-finals =====
25 Aug 2015 Quarter-finals 1st Leg	Johor Darul Ta'zim FC (Malaysia)	1 – 1	(Hong Kong) South China FC	Johor Bahru, Johor
20:45 UTC+08:00	Luciano Figueroa 49' pen 51'	(HT 0-0)	Mahama Awal 63'	Stadium: Tan Sri Dato Haji Hassan Yunos Stadium; Attendance: 14,700; Referee: Ahmed Abu Bakar Said Al-Kaf (Oman)

15 Sept 2015 Quarter-finals 2nd Leg	South China FC (Hong Kong)	1 – 3	(Malaysia) Johor Darul Ta'zim FC	Wanchai, Hong Kong
20:00 UTC+08:00	Mahama Awal 28'	(HT 1-3)	Mahali Jasuli 26'; Luciano Figueroa (red card); Aidil Zafuan (yellow card) 37'; Mohd Izham Tarmizi (yellow card) 53'; Safee Sali 30' 45+2' (yellow card) 59'	Stadium: Hong Kong Stadium; Attendance: 6,412; Referee: Fahad Jaber Al-Marri (Qatar)

===== Semi-finals =====
29 Sept 2015 Semi-finals 1st Leg	Al-Qadsia SC (Kuwait)	3 – 1	(Malaysia) Johor Darul Ta'zim FC	Hawalli, Kuwait
19:00 UTC+08:00	Doris Fuakumputu 32'; Bader Al-Mutawa 42' pen Seydouba Soumah 57'	(HT 2-0)	Leandro Velazquez (yellow card) 24'; Safiq Rahim (yellow card) 52'; Gary Steven Robbat (yellow card) 52'; S. Chanturu (yellow card) 67'; Mohd Amri Yahyah 82'; Mohd Fazly Mazlan (yellow card) 88'	Stadium: Mohammed Al-Hamad Stadium; Attendance: 1,501; Referee: Ko Hyung Jin (South Korea)

Johor Darul Ta'zim FC (Malaysia)	P – P	(Kuwait) Qadsia SC

===== Final =====
31 Oct 2015 Finals	FC Istiklol (Tajikistan)	0 – 1	(Malaysia) Johor Darul Ta'zim FC	Dushanbe, Tajikistan
19:30 UTC+08:00		(HT 0-1)	Leandro Velazquez 23'	Stadium: Central Republican Stadium; Attendance: 18,000; Referee: Minoru Tojo (Japan)

== Goalscorers ==
Includes all competitive matches. The list is sorted by shirt number when total goals are equal.

As of match played 28 Nov 2015

Rank	Pos.	No.	Player	Super League	FA Cup	ACL/AFC Cup	Malaysia Cup	Total
1	FW	19	(Argentina) Luciano Figueroa	12	0	5	1	18
2	MF	8	(Malaysia) Safiq Rahim	7	0	4	4	15
3	FW	17	(Malaysia) Mohd Amri Yahyah	5	0	2	1	8
4	FW	10	(Malaysia) Safee Sali	1	0	4	3	8
5	MF	23	(Malaysia) S. Chanturu	1	0	2	2	5
6	MF	14	(Singapore) Hariss Harun	1	1	1	1	4
7	DF	18	(Malaysia) Mahali Jasuli	1	0	1	1	3
8	MF	20	(Malaysia) Nazrin Nawi	1	0	1	1	3
9	MF	25	(Malaysia) Junior Eldstål	2	0	0	0	2
10	DF	4	(Malaysia) Asraruddin Putra Omar	1	0	1	0	2
11	DF	6	(Brazil) Marcos Antonio	1	0	0	1	2
12	FW	42	(Argentina) Jorge Pereyra Díaz	0	0	2	0	2
13	MF	5	(Malaysia) Mohd Amirul Hadi Zainal	0	0	0	2	2
14	FW	9	(Sierra Leone) Alhaji Kamara	1	0	0	0	1
15	FW	11	(Argentina) Patito Rodríguez	1	0	0	0	1
16	DF	7	(Malaysia) Aidil Zafuan	1	0	0	0	1
17	MF	9	(Argentina) Leandro Velazquez	0	0	1	0	1
Own Goals				0	0	0	0	0
TOTALS				36	1	24	17	78

== Top assists ==
Includes all competitive matches. The list is sorted by shirt number when total assists are equal.

As of match played 24 Nov 2015

Rank	Pos.	No.	Player	Super League	FA Cup	ACL/AFC Cup	Malaysia Cup	Total
1	MF	8	(Malaysia) Safiq Rahim	4	0	3	0	7
2	FW	19	(Argentina) Luciano Figueroa	4	0	1	2	7
3	MF	20	(Malaysia) Nazrin Nawi	2	1	3	0	6
4	MF	12	(Malaysia) S. Kunanlan	3	0	1	1	5
5	DF	18	(Malaysia) Mahali Jasuli	1	0	1	3	5
6	FW	17	(Malaysia) Mohd Amri Yahyah	2	0	0	2	4
7	MF	23	(Malaysia) S. Chanturu	2	0	0	1	3
8	FW	11	(Argentina) Jorge Pereyra Díaz	0	0	3	0	3
9	FW	11	(Argentina) Patito Rodríguez	2	0	0	0	2
10	DF	7	(Malaysia) Aidil Zafuan Abdul Radzak	2	0	0	0	2
11	MF	14	(Singapore) Hariss Harun	1	0	1	0	2
12	MF	21	(Malaysia) Jasazrin Jamaluddin	1	0	1	0	2
13	MF	9	(Argentina) Leandro Velazquez	0	0	2	0	2
14	FW	10	(Malaysia) Safee Sali	1	0	0	0	1
15	DF	4	(Malaysia) Asraruddin Putra Omar	1	0	0	0	1
16	FW	9	(Sierra Leone) Alhaji Kamara	1	0	0	0	1
17	FW	25	(Malaysia) Junior Eldstål	0	0	0	1	1

== Disciplinary record ==
As of match played 24 Nov 2015

No.	Pos.	Name	Super League		FA Cup		Malaysia Cup		Asia		Total	
No.	Pos.	Name	Yellow card	Red card	Yellow card	Red card	Yellow card	Red card	Yellow card	Red card	Yellow card	Red card
6	DF	(Brazil) Marcos Antonio	6	0	0	0	1	0	0	0	7	0
27	DF	(Malaysia) Fadhli Shas	3	0	0	0	0	0	3	0	6	0
12	MF	(Malaysia) S. Kunanlan	3	0	1	0	1	0	0	0	5	0
8	MF	(Malaysia) Safiq Rahim	3	0	0	0	1	0	1	0	5	0
1	GK	(Malaysia) Mohd Farizal Marlias	1	0	0	0	1	0	3	0	5	0
14	MF	(Singapore) Hariss Harun	2	0	0	0	0	0	2	0	4	0
13	MF	(Malaysia) Gary Steven Robbat	1	0	0	0	1	0	2	0	4	0
19	FW	(Argentina) Luciano Figueroa	2	0	0	0	0	0	1	1	3	1
16	MF	(Malaysia) Mohd Shakir Shaari	3	0	0	0	0	0	0	0	3	0
17	FW	(Malaysia) Mohd Amri Yahyah	2	0	0	0	0	0	1	0	3	0
20	MF	(Malaysia) Nazrin Nawi	2	0	0	0	0	0	1	0	3	0
10	FW	(Malaysia) Safee Sali	1	0	1	0	0	0	1	0	3	0
23	MF	(Malaysia) S. Chanturu	0	0	0	0	1	0	2	0	3	0
25	MF	(Malaysia) Junior Eldstål	1	1	0	0	0	0	1	0	2	1
18	DF	(Malaysia) Mahali Jasuli	2	0	0	0	0	0	0	0	2	0
7	MF	(Malaysia) Aidil Zafuan	2	0	0	0	0	0	0	0	2	0
21	MF	(Malaysia) Jasazrin Jamaluddin	1	0	1	0	0	0	0	0	2	0
26	DF	(Malaysia) Mohd Amer Saidin	0	0	0	0	0	1	0	0	0	1
11	FW	(Argentina) Patito Rodríguez	1	0	0	0	0	0	0	0	1	0
4	DF	(Malaysia) Asraruddin Putra Omar	0	0	1	0	0	0	0	0	1	0
5	MF	(Malaysia) Amirul Hadi Zainal	0	0	0	0	0	0	1	0	1	0
42	FW	(Argentina) Jorge Pereyra Díaz	0	0	0	0	0	0	1	0	1	0
33	MF	(Malaysia) Mohd Fazly Mazlan	0	0	0	0	0	0	1	0	1	0
9	MF	(Argentina) Leandro Velazquez	0	0	0	0	0	0	1	0	1	0
Total			36	1	4	0	6	1	22	1	68	3

== Home attendance ==
=== Matches (All Competitions) ===
Date	Attendance	Opposition	Score	Competition	Ref
31 January 2015	21,618	Pahang F.C.	2-0	Malaysia Super League	
7 March 2015	19,430	Sarawak FA	2-1	Malaysia Super League	
4 April 2015	15,950	ATM FA	2-1	Malaysia Super League	
18 April 2015	21,100	Kelantan FA	3-1	Malaysia Super League	
3 May 2015	25,100	Felda United F.C.	1-0	Malaysia Super League	
23 June 2015	6,900	Terengganu FA	2-0	Malaysia Super League	
4 July 2015	9,910	PDRM FA	2-1	Malaysia Super League	
13 July 2015	11,340	Selangor FA	3-1	Malaysia Super League	
5 August 2015	7,830	Sime Darby F.C.	4-0	Malaysia Super League	
12 August 2015	20,100	LionsXII	1-0	Malaysia Super League	
19 August 2015	24,920	Perak FA	4-1	Malaysia Super League	
11 September 2015	18,710	Perak FA	2-0	Malaysia Cup Group Stage	
17 October 2015	13,360	ATM FA	4-0	Malaysia Cup Group Stage	
21 November 2015	14,985	Sarawak FA	1-1	Malaysia Cup Group Stage	
28 November 2015	23,410	Felda United F.C.	1-2	Malaysia Cup Quarter-final	
24 February 2015	12,212	East Bengal F.C.	4-1	AFC Cup Group Stage	
14 April 2015	10,154	Kitchee SC	2-0	AFC Cup Group Stage	
12 May 2015	10,110	Balestier Khalsa FC	3-0	AFC Cup Group Stage	
27 May 2015	16,850	Ayeyawady United F.C.	5-0	AFC Cup Round of 16	
25 August 2015	14,700	South China AA	1-1	AFC Cup Quarter-final 1st Leg	
20 October 2015	-	Qadsia SC	Cancelled	AFC Cup Semi-final 2nd Leg	

=== Home Attendance (Each Competitions) ===
Competition(s)	Match(s)	Total Attendance	Average Attendance per Match
Malaysia Super League	11	184,198	16,745
Malaysia FA Cup	-	-	-
Malaysia Cup	4	70,465	17,616
2015 AFC Cup	5	64,026	12,805
Total	20	318,689	15,934
