= 2015 Malaysia Cup final =

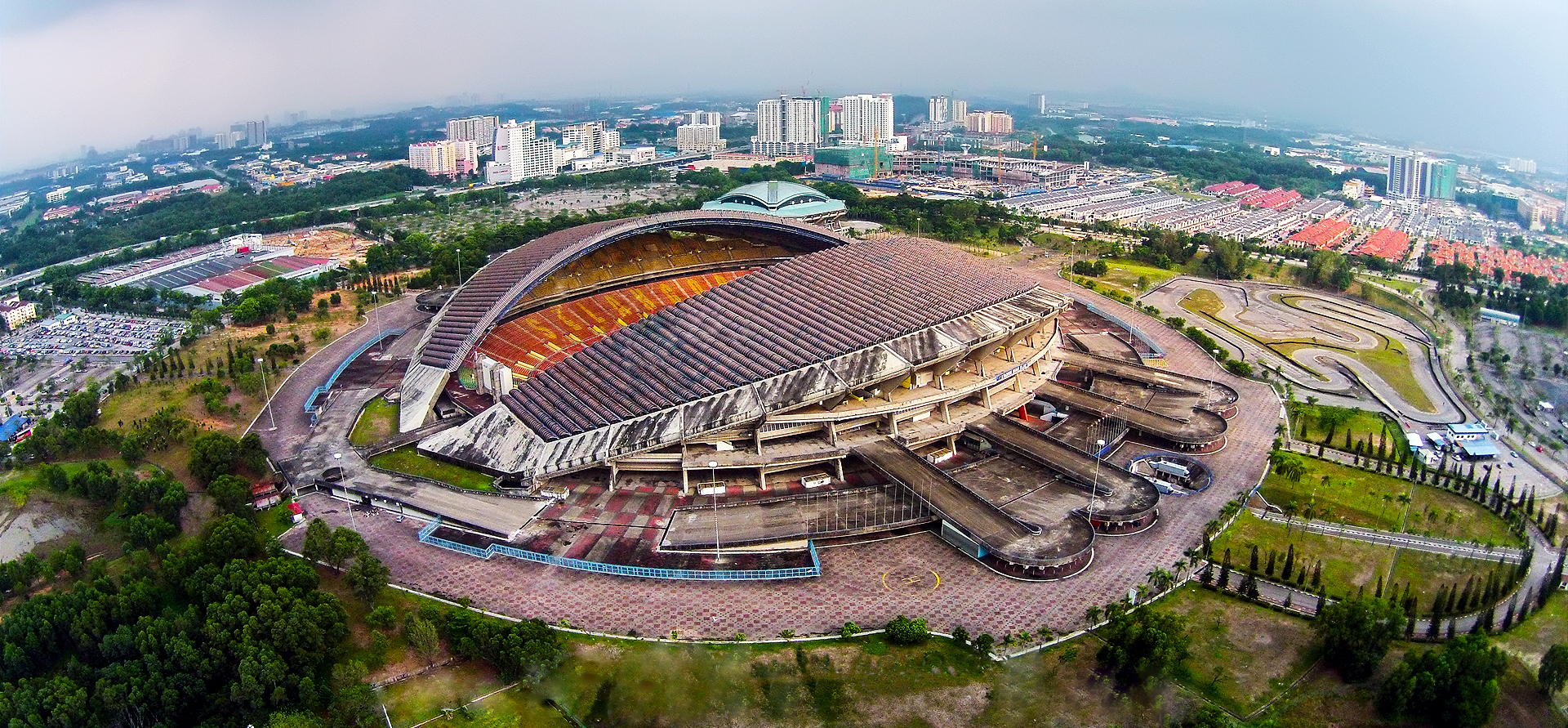
- The match was played at Shah Alam Stadium.
- Event: 2015 Malaysia Cup
| Selangor | Kedah |
| 2 | 0 |
- Date: 12 December 2015
- Venue: Shah Alam Stadium, Shah Alam
- Man of the Match: Hazwan Bakri
- Referee: Nazmi Nasaruddin
- Attendance: 80,000
- Weather: Rainy

The 2015 Malaysia Cup final was a football match which was played on 12 December 2015, to determine the champion of the 2015 Malaysia Cup. It was the final of the 89th edition of the Malaysia Cup, competition organised by the Football Association of Malaysia.

The final was played between Selangor and Kedah. Selangor won the cup after beating Kedah 2–0 with a brace from Ahmad Hazwan Bakri.

== Venue ==
The final was held at the Shah Alam Stadium.

== Road to final ==
Note: In all results below, the score of the finalist is given first.

| Selangor | | | | Round | Kedah | | | |
|---|---|---|---|---|---|---|---|---|
| Opponent | Result | | | Group stage | Opponent | Result | | |
| Kelantan | 0–3 (H) | | | Matchday 1 | (Singapore) LionsXII | 1–1 (A) | | |
| T–Team | 1–0 (A) | | | Matchday 2 | Terengganu | 5–0 (H) | | |
| FELDA United | 0–0 (H) | | | Matchday 3 | Johor Darul Ta'zim II | 2–3 (H) | | |
| Kelantan | 1–0 (A) | | | Matchday 4 | (Singapore) LionsXII | 2–0 (H) | | |
| T–Team | 2–1 (H) | | | Matchday 5 | Terengganu | 1–3 (A) | | |
| FELDA United | 2–3 (A) | | | Matchday 6 | Johor Darul Ta'zim II | 4–2 (A) | | |
| Group C winner: Team / Pld / W / D / L / GF / GA / GD / Pts; Selangor / 6 / 3 / 1 / 2 / 6 / 7 / -1 / 10; FELDA United / 6 / 2 / 3 / 1 / 10 / 7 / +3 / 9; Kelantan / 6 / 2 / 2 / 2 / 10 / 8 / +2 / 8; T-Team / 6 / 2 / 0 / 4 / 7 / 11 / −4 / 6 | | | | Final standings | Group A runners-up: Team / Pld / W / D / L / GF / GA / GD / Pts; (Singapore) LionsXII / 6 / 4 / 1 / 1 / 9 / 7 / +2 / 13; Kedah / 6 / 3 / 1 / 2 / 15 / 9 / +6 / 10; Terengganu / 6 / 2 / 1 / 3 / 8 / 12 / -4 / 7; Johor Darul Ta'zim II / 6 / 1 / 1 / 4 / 7 / 11 / −4 / 4 | | | |
| Opponent | Agg. | 1st leg | 2nd leg | Knockout phase | Opponent | Agg. | 1st leg | 2nd leg |
| Sarawak | 3–2 | 2–1 (A) | 1–1 (H) | Quarter-finals | PKNS | 4–2 | 1–1 (H) | 3–1 (A) |
| Pahang | 2–0 | 0–0 (A) | 2–0 (H) | Semi-finals | FELDA United | 4–3 | 2–2 (A) | 2–1 (H) |

== Match details ==
12 December 2015
21:00 MST

| Selangor | 2–0 | Kedah |
|---|---|---|
| Hazwan 4', 48' | Report |

Shah Alam Stadium, Shah Alam
Attendance: 80,000
Referee: Nazmi Nasaruddin

| Selangor | Kedah |

| GK | 25 | (Malaysia) Norazlan Razali |
| RB | 20 | (Malaysia) Azrif Nasrulhaq |
| CB | 5 | (Malaysia) Shahrom Kalam (c) |
| CB | 2 | (Australia) Robert Cornthwaite |
| LB | 15 | (Malaysia) Raimi Nor |
| RM | 21 | (Indonesia) Andik Vermansyah | | (substituted off) 83' |
| CM | 10 | (Malaysia) Nazmi Faiz |
| CM | 8 | (Brazil) Leandro dos Santos |
| LM | 14 | (Malaysia) Hadi Yahya | | (substituted off) 89' |
| SS | 13 | (Brazil) Guilherme de Paula |
| CF | 11 | (Malaysia) Hazwan Bakri | (yellow card) 22' | (substituted off) 78' |
Substitutions:
| MF | 23 | (Malaysia) S. Veenod | | (substituted in) 78' |
| MF | 24 | (Malaysia) Fitri Shazwan | | (substituted in) 83' |
| MF | 25 | (Malaysia) K. Gurusamy | | (substituted in) 89' |
Manager:
(Australia) Mehmet Durakovic

| GK | 25 | (Malaysia) Firdaus Muhamad | | (red card) 84' |
| RB | 15 | (Malaysia) Rizal Ghazali |
| CB | 4 | (South Korea) Bang Seung-Hwan |
| CB | 13 | (Malaysia) Khairul Helmi (c) |
| LB | 6 | (Malaysia) Shafizan Hashim | (yellow card) 23' | (substituted off) 75' |
| CM | 8 | (Malaysia) Baddrol Bakhtiar |
| CM | 17 | (Malaysia) Syazwan Tajuddin | | (substituted off) 58' |
| RW | 50 | (Brazil) Sandro |
| AM | 49 | (Kosovo) Liridon Krasniqi |
| LW | 24 | (Malaysia) Syazwan Zainon | | (substituted off) 85' |
| CF | 10 | (Nigeria) Chidi Edeh | (yellow card) 43' |
Substitutes:
| MF | 19 | (Malaysia) Farhan Roslan | | (substituted in) 58' |
| FW | 20 | (Malaysia) Syafiq Ahmad | | (substituted in) 75' |
| GK | 21 | (Malaysia) Syazwan Abdullah | | (substituted in) 84' |
Manager:
(Malaysia) Tan Cheng Hoe

Officials

- Linesmen:
  - Ismadi Ibrahim
  - Abdul Haron Osman
- Fourth official:
  - Ahmad Zuhaidi Dzulkifli

Match Rules

- 90 minutes.
- 30 minutes of extra time if necessary.
- Penalty shoot-out if scores still level.
- Seven named substitutes.
- Maximum of three substitutions.
