= 2015 Malaysia Cup group stage =

The 2015 Malaysia Cup group stage was played from 11 September to 8 November 2015. A total of 16 teams competed in the group stage to decide the 8 places in the knockout phase of the 2015 Malaysia Cup. The teams were drawn into fourth groups of four, and played each other home-and-away in a round-robin format.

== Groups ==
The matchdays started on 11 September 2015.

=== Group A ===
Pos	Team	Pld	W	D	L	GF	GA	GD	Pts	Qualification
1	(Singapore) LionsXII	6	4	1	1	9	7	+2	13	Advance to knockout phase
2	Kedah	6	3	1	2	15	9	+6	10	Advance to knockout phase
3	Terengganu	6	2	1	3	8	12	−4	7	
4	Johor Darul Ta'zim II	6	1	1	4	7	11	−4	4	

Source: FAM Astro Arena
12 September 2015
20:45

Terengganu	0–0	Johor Darul Ta'zim II
	Report

Sultan Mizan Zainal Abidin Stadium, Kuala Nerus
Attendance: 13,500
Referee: Zulkifli Ahmad
12 September 2015
19:45 UTC+8

LionsXII (Singapore)	1–1	Kedah
Shahdan 17'	Report	Sandro 15'

Jalan Besar Stadium, Kallang, Singapore
Attendance: 5,266
Referee: Zamzaidi Katimin

18 September 2015
20:45 UTC+8

Kedah	5–0	Terengganu
Sandro 52', 66' (pen.), 82'; Farhan 71'; Fadhil 87'	Report

Darul Aman Stadium, Alor Setar
Attendance: 15,754
Referee: Nazmi Nasaruddin
19 September 2015
20:45 UTC+8

Johor Darul Ta'zim II	1–2	(Singapore) LionsXII
Delmonte 72'	Report	Safuwan 22', 90+2'

Pasir Gudang Corporation Stadium, Pasir Gudang
Attendance: 3,200
Referee: Amirul Izwan Yaacob

26 September 2015
19:45 UTC+8

LionsXII (Singapore)	3–2	Terengganu
Sahil 35'; Safuwan 53', 88'	Report	Rangel 4', 44'

Jalan Besar Stadium, Kallang, Singapore
Attendance: 5,386
Referee: Wan Mohd Tarmizi Wan Ibrahim
29 September 2015
20:45 UTC+8

Kedah	2–3	Johor Darul Ta'zim II
Sandro 38'; Edeh 33'	Report	Shahril 15'; Baihakki 45+2'; Zaquan 79'

Darul Aman Stadium, Alor Setar
Attendance: 25,000
Referee: Nazmi Nasaruddin

2 October 2015
20:45 UTC+8

Kedah	2–0	(Singapore) LionsXII
Edeh 48', 78'	Report

Darul Aman Stadium, Alor Setar
Attendance: 21,000
Referee: Amirul Izwan Yaacob

17 October 2015
20:45 UTC+8

Terengganu	3–1	Kedah
Nakajima-Farran 24', 73'; Hasmizan 76'	Report	Seung-Hwan 68'

Sultan Mizan Zainal Abidin Stadium, Kuala Nerus
Attendance: 8,600
Referee: Wan Mohd Tarmizi Wan Ibrahim
17 October 2015
19:45 UTC+8

LionsXII (Singapore)	1–0	Johor Darul Ta'zim II
Shahdan 60'	Report

Jalan Besar Stadium, Kallang, Singapore
Attendance: 5,486
Referee: Zohri Tajuddin

27 October 2015
20:45 UTC+8

Johor Darul Ta'zim II	1–2	Terengganu
Shahril 34'	Report	Issey 8'; Faruqi 87'

Pasir Gudang Corporation Stadium, Pasir Gudang
Attendance: 4,400
Referee: S. Sittharanjanan

7 November 2015
20:45 UTC+8

Johor Darul Ta'zim II	2–4	Kedah
Delmonte 26'; Akram 28'	Report	Edeh 17'; Syazwan 62'; Syafiq 70'; Krasniqi 77'

Pasir Gudang Corporation Stadium, Pasir Gudang
Attendance: 2,900
Referee: Wan Mohd Tarmizi Wan Ibrahim
7 November 2015
20:45 UTC+8

Terengganu	1–2	(Singapore) LionsXII
Dhiyaulrahman 15'	Report	Sufian 16'; Van Huizen 90'

Sultan Mizan Zainal Abidin Stadium, Kuala Nerus
Attendance: 21,000
Referee: Syed Azhar Syed Kamar

=== Group B ===
Pos	Team	Pld	W	D	L	GF	GA	GD	Pts	
1	Johor Darul Ta'zim	6	5	1	0	15	4	+11	16	Advance to knockout phase
2	Sarawak	6	2	2	2	5	7	−2	8	Advance to knockout phase
3	ATM	6	2	1	3	10	13	−3	7	
4	Perak	6	1	0	5	5	11	−6	3	

Source: FAM Astro Arena
11 September 2015
20:45 UTC+8

Johor Darul Ta'zim	2–0	Perak
Safee 17'; Chanturu 23'	Report

Tan Sri Dato Haji Hassan Yunos Stadium, Johor Bahru
Attendance: 18,710
Referee: Syed Azhar Syed Kamar
12 September 2015
20:45 UTC+8

Sarawak	1–0	ATM
Joseph 90+2'	Report

Sarawak State Stadium, Kuching
Attendance: 2,130
Referee: Wan Mohd Tarmizi Wan Ibrahim

19 September 2015
20:45 UTC+8

Perak	1–0	Sarawak
Bobby 63'	Report

Perak Stadium, Ipoh
Attendance: 3,500
Referee: Samsudin Ibrahim
19 September 2015
20:45 UTC+8

ATM	2–3	Johor Darul Ta'zim
Abdulafees 69' (pen.), 90+4' (pen.)	Report	Marcos Antônio 11'; Mahali 28'; Safiq 51'

Tuanku Abdul Rahman Stadium, Seremban
Attendance: 4,811
Referee: S. Sittharanjanan

26 September 2015
20:45 UTC+8

Perak	0–2	ATM
	Report	Pelacios 40'; Venice 89'

Perak Stadium, Ipoh
Attendance: 7,000
Referee: Zamzaidi Katimin

17 October 2015
20:45 UTC+8

Sarawak	1–0	Perak
Partiban 35'	Report

Sarawak State Stadium, Kuching
Attendance: 0
Referee: Samsudin Ibrahim
17 October 2015
20:45 UTC+8

Johor Darul Ta'zim	4–0	ATM
Chanturu 11'; Safiq 24'; Figueroa 36'; Nazrin 70'	Report

Tan Sri Dato Haji Hassan Yunos Stadium, Johor Bahru
Attendance: 13,360
Referee: Suhaizi Shukri

24 October 2015
20:45 UTC+8

Sarawak	0–3	Johor Darul Ta'zim
	Report	Safee 10' (pen.); Hariss 79'; Safiq 88'

Sarawak State Stadium, Kuching
Attendance: 6,030
Referee: Syed Azhar Syed Kamar

4 November 2015
20:45 UTC+8

ATM	2–2	Sarawak
Abdulafees 34'; Palacios 61' (pen.)	Report	Patrick 15'; Griffiths 56'

Tuanku Abdul Rahman Stadium, Seremban
Attendance: 1,012
Referee: Zamzaidi Katimin
4 November 2015
20:45 UTC+8

Perak	1–2	Johor Darul Ta'zim
Chad Souza 29'	Report	Amri 37'; Safee 45+2'

Perak Stadium, Ipoh
Attendance: 5,339
Referee: Zulkifli Ahmad

8 November 2015
20:45 UTC+8

Johor Darul Ta'zim	1–1	Sarawak
Amirul 37'	Report	Nyema 49'

Tan Sri Dato Haji Hassan Yunos Stadium, Johor Bahru
Attendance: 14,985
Referee: Zohri Tajuddin
8 November 2015
20:45 UTC+8

ATM	4–3	Perak
Karlović 12', 59'; Norfazly 32'; Abdulafees 36'	Report	Khairil 45'; Chad Souza 63', 88'

Tuanku Abdul Rahman Stadium, Seremban
Attendance: 360
Referee: S. Sittharanjanan

=== Group C ===
Pos	Team	Pld	W	D	L	GF	GA	GD	Pts	Qualification
1	Selangor	6	3	1	2	6	7	−1	10	Advance to knockout phase
2	FELDA United	6	2	3	1	10	7	+3	9	Advance to knockout phase
3	Kelantan	6	2	2	2	10	8	+2	8	
4	T–Team	6	2	0	4	7	11	−4	6	

Source: FAM Astro Arena
12 September 2015
20:45 UTC+8

Selangor	0–3	Kelantan
	Report	Gilmar 26', 53'; Iwuji 49'

Shah Alam Stadium, Shah Alam
Attendance: 13,260
Referee: Nazmi Nasaruddin
12 September 2015
20:45 UTC+8

FELDA United	3–0	T–Team
Makeche 35', 69'; Indra 38' (pen.)	Report

Selayang Municipal Council Stadium, Selayang
Attendance: 600
Referee: Ahmad Zuhadi Dzulkifli

18 September 2015
20:45 UTC+8

Kelantan	1–1	FELDA United
Gilmar 48'	Report	Syamim 63'

Sultan Muhammad IV Stadium, Kota Bharu
Attendance: 10,413
Referee: Zamzaidi Katimin
19 September 2015
20:45 UTC+8

T–Team	0–1	Selangor
	Report	de Paula 51'

Sultan Ismail Nasiruddin Shah Stadium, Kuala Terengganu
Attendance: 1,250
Referee: Syed Azhar Syed Kamar

26 September 2015
20:45 UTC+8

T–Team	3–1	Kelantan
Zulhanizam 15', 21'; Bušić 31'	Report	Gilmar 87'

Sultan Ismail Nasiruddin Shah Stadium, Kuala Terengganu
Attendance: 1,999
Referee: Nafeez Abd Wahab
26 September 2015
20:45 UTC+8

Selangor	0–0	FELDA United
	Report

Shah Alam Stadium, Shah Alam
Attendance: 5,273
Referee: Nazmi Nasaruddin

2 October 2015
20:45 UTC+8

Kelantan	0–1	Selangor
	Report	Hazrul 15' (o.g.)

Sultan Muhammad IV Stadium, Kota Bharu
Attendance: 3,500
Referee: Zamzaidi Katimin
3 October 2015
20:45 UTC+8

T–Team	2–1	FELDA United
Sadriddin 3'; Bušić 62'	Report	Zah Rahan 39'

Sultan Ismail Nasiruddin Shah Stadium, Kuala Terengganu
Attendance: 1,644
Referee: Zohri Tajuddin

17 October 2015
20:45 UTC+8

FELDA United	2–2	Kelantan
Thiago 18', 32'	Report	Fakri 28'; Badhri 43'

Selayang Municipal Council Stadium, Selayang
Attendance: 2,477
Referee: Nafeez Abd Wahab
17 October 2015
20:45 UTC+8

Selangor	2–1	T–Team
Andik 18'; Hazwan 72'	Report	Zarulizwan 28'

Shah Alam Stadium, Shah Alam
Attendance: 5,010
Referee: Ahmad Zuhadi Dzulkifli

4 November 2015
20:45 UTC+8

FELDA United	3–2	Selangor
Thiago 49', 51'; Cornthwaite 65' (o.g.)	Report	Shazlan 31' de Paula 89'

Selayang Municipal Council Stadium, Selayang
Attendance: 1,886
Referee: Nazmi Nasaruddin
4 November 2015
20:45 UTC+8

Kelantan	3–1	T–Team
Iwuji 35', 56'; Gilmar 40'	Report	Bušić 64' (pen.)

Sultan Muhammad IV Stadium, Kota Bharu
Attendance: 5,732
Referee: Suhaizi Shukri

=== Group D ===
Pos	Team	Pld	W	D	L	GF	GA	GD	Pts	Qualification
1	PKNS	6	3	2	1	12	5	+7	11	Advance to knockout phase
2	Pahang	6	3	1	2	11	11	0	10	Advance to knockout phase
3	Penang	6	1	3	2	10	11	−1	6	
4	PDRM	6	1	2	3	10	16	−6	5	

Source: FAM Astro Arena
12 September 2015
20:45 UTC+8

Pahang	4–3	PDRM
Azamuddin 2', 35', 65'; Nwakaeme 79'	Report	Traoré 12'; Ashfaq 71'; Bragança 75'

Darul Makmur Stadium, Kuantan
Attendance: 7,336
Referee: Samsudin Ibrahim
12 September 2015
20:45 UTC+8

Penang	0–3	PKNS
	Report	Nazrin 17'; Guerra 18'; Nizam 54'

City Stadium, George Town
Attendance: 5,055
Referee: Ku Alauddin Ku Muhammad

19 September 2015
20:45 UTC+8

PDRM	3–3	Penang
Shahurain 33'; Ashfaq 43'; Sumareh 87'	Report	Azniee 20', 80'; Lee 56'

Shah Alam Stadium, Shah Alam
Attendance: 1,500
Referee: Wan Mohd Tarmizi Wan Ibrahim
19 September 2015
20:45 UTC+8

PKNS	0–2	Pahang
	Report	Azamuddin 59'; Nwakaeme 90'

MBPJ Stadium, Petaling Jaya
Attendance: 4,550
Referee: Ahmad Zuhadi Dzulkifli

26 September 2015
20:45 UTC+8

Penang	4–1	Pahang
Failee 38', 47'; Azniee 80'; Gonçalves 85'	Report	Nwakaeme 41'

City Stadium, George Town
Attendance: 6,250
Referee: Samsudin Ibrahim
28 September 2015
20:45 UTC+8

PDRM	1–1	PKNS
Ashfaq 51'	Report	Guerra 19'

Shah Alam Stadium, Shah Alam
Attendance: 1,000
Referee: Zulkifli Ahmad

17 October 2015
20:45 UTC+8

Penang	2–3	PDRM
Lee 67'; Faisal 90'	Report	Sumareh 4', 85'; Nizam 9'

City Stadium, George Town
Attendance: 6,940
Referee: Zulkifli Ahmad
17 October 2015
20:45 UTC+8

Pahang	1–4	PKNS
Zesh 41'	Report	Guerra 16'; Pedro 26'; Nizam 81'; Patrick 90'

Darul Makmur Stadium, Kuantan
Attendance: 8,125
Referee: Syed Azhar Syed Kamar

27 October 2015
20:45 UTC+8

PDRM	0–3	Pahang
	Report	Nwakaeme 28'; Conti 30', 87'

Shah Alam Stadium, Shah Alam
Attendance: 2,500
Referee: Tiong Eng Tai
27 October 2015
20:45 UTC+8

PKNS	1–1	Penang
Alif 43'	Report	Lee 16'

MBPJ Stadium, Petaling Jaya
Attendance: 625
Referee: Suhaizi Shukri

7 November 2015
20:45 UTC+8

Pahang	0–0	Penang
	Report

Darul Makmur Stadium, Kuantan
Attendance: 6,669
Referee: Samsudin Ibrahim
7 November 2015
20:45 UTC+8

PKNS	3–0	PDRM
Guerra 9'; Patrick 23'; Fazli 88'	Report

MBPJ Stadium, Petaling Jaya
Attendance: 475
Referee: Ku Alauddin Ku Muhammad
