= Mohd Aizulridzwan Razali =

Malaysian footballer

Aizulridzwan Razali
Personal information
- Full name: Mohd Aizulridzwan bin Razali
- Date of birth: 19 November 1986 (age 39)
- Place of birth: Selangor, Malaysia
- Height: 1.70 m (5 ft 7 in)
- Position: Left back

Team information
- Current team: Kuala Lumpur Rovers
- Number: 18

Senior career*
Years	Team	Apps	(Gls)
2011	PKNS	10	(0)
2012	DRB-Hicom	3	(0)
2013	T–Team	0	(0)
2014–2017	Felda United	13	(0)
2018	Negeri Sembilan	21	(0)
2019	Petaling Jaya City	5	(1)
2020–	Melaka United	2	(0)
2022	Kuala Lumpur Rovers	0	(0)
- * Club domestic league appearances and goals as of 27 June 2018

Mohd Aizulridzwan bin Razali (born 19 November 1986) is a Malaysian footballer who plays for Kuala Lumpur Rovers mainly as a left back.

In his fourth consecutive season he looked set to finish empty-handed.
