= 2015 Malaysia Cup =

2015 TM Malaysia Cup
TM Piala Malaysia 2015

Tournament details
- Country: Malaysia; Singapore
- Teams: 16

Final positions
- Champions: Selangor (33rd title)
- Runners-up: Kedah

Tournament statistics
- Matches played: 31
- Goals scored: 184 (5.94 per match)
- Top goal scorer(s): (8 goals); Sandro; Thiago Augusto Fernandes

Awards
- Best player: Ahmad Hazwan Bakri

The 2015 Malaysia Cup (Malay: Piala Malaysia 2015) was the 89th edition of Malaysia Cup tournament organised by the Football Association of Malaysia.

The 2015 Malaysia Cup began on August with a preliminary round. A total of 16 teams took part in the competition. The teams were divided into four groups, each containing four teams. The group leaders and runners-up teams in the groups after six matches qualified to the quarterfinals.

Pahang were the defending champions, having beaten Johor Darul Takzim on a penalty shootout 5–3 in last season's final, but they were eliminated by the eventual winner, Selangor, in the semi-finals. Selangor won the trophy after beating Kedah 2–0.

This edition also marked the last appearance of LionsXII in this competition.

== Format ==
In the competition, the top 10 teams from 2015 Malaysia Super League were joined by the top 4 teams from 2015 Malaysia Premier League. The remaining two teams from 2015 Malaysia Super League and the team who finished 5th and 6th place in the 2015 Malaysia Premier League competed in the playoffs for the remaining 2 spots. The teams were drawn into four groups of four teams.

== Round and draw dates ==
The draw for the 2015 Malaysia Cup was held on 27 August 2015 at the Hilton Petaling Jaya with the participating team coaches and captains in attendance.

Phase	Round	Draw date	First leg	Second leg
Play-off	Play-off round		25 August 2015	
Group stage	Matchday 1	27 August 2015 (Kuala Lumpur)	11–12 September 2015	
Group stage	Matchday 2	27 August 2015 (Kuala Lumpur)	18–19 September 2015	
Group stage	Matchday 3	27 August 2015 (Kuala Lumpur)	26 September 2015	
Group stage	Matchday 4	27 August 2015 (Kuala Lumpur)	2–3 & 17 & 24 October 2015	
Group stage	Matchday 5	27 August 2015 (Kuala Lumpur)	17 & 27 October & 4 November 2015	
Group stage	Matchday 6	27 August 2015 (Kuala Lumpur)	4 & 21 November 2015	
Knockout phase	Quarter-finals	27 August 2015 (Kuala Lumpur)	24 November 2015	28 November 2015
Knockout phase	Semi-finals	27 August 2015 (Kuala Lumpur)	2 December 2015	6 December 2015
Knockout phase	Final	27 August 2015 (Kuala Lumpur)	12 December 2015	

== Play-off ==
25 August 2015
20:45

ATM	3–0	Negeri Sembilan
Abdulafees 12', 52'; Shukur 38'	Report

Majlis Perbandaran Selayang Stadium, Selayang

25 August 2015
20:45

Sime Darby	0–1	Johor Darul Ta'zim II
	Report	Shafiq 45'

Tuanku Abdul Rahman Stadium, Paroi

== Seeding ==
Pot 1	Pot 2	Pot 3	Pot 4
Johor Darul Takzim; Pahang; Selangor; Terengganu	FELDA United; PDRM (Singapore) LionsXII; Perak	Kelantan; Sarawak; Kedah; Penang	T–Team; PKNS; ATM; Johor Darul Ta'zim II

== Group stage ==
=== Group A ===
Pos	Team	Pld	W	D	L	GF	GA	GD	Pts	Qualification	LIO	KED	TER	JDT
1	(Singapore) LionsXII	6	4	1	1	9	7	+2	13	Advance to knockout phase	—	1–1	3–2	1–0
2	Kedah	6	3	1	2	15	9	+6	10	Advance to knockout phase	2–0	—	5–0	2–3
3	Terengganu	6	2	1	3	8	12	−4	7		1–2	3–1	—	0–0
4	Johor Darul Ta'zim II	6	1	1	4	7	11	−4	4		1–2	2–4	1–1	—

Source: FAM Astro Arena

=== Group B ===
Pos	Team	Pld	W	D	L	GF	GA	GD	Pts		JDT	SAR	ATM	PER
1	Johor Darul Ta'zim	6	5	1	0	15	4	+11	16	Advance to knockout phase	—	1–1	4–0	2–0
2	Sarawak	6	2	2	2	5	7	−2	8	Advance to knockout phase	0–3	—	1–0	1–0
3	ATM	6	2	1	3	10	13	−3	7		2–3	2–2	—	4–3
4	Perak	6	1	0	5	5	11	−6	3		1–2	1–0	0–2	—

Source: FAM Astro Arena

=== Group C ===
Pos	Team	Pld	W	D	L	GF	GA	GD	Pts	Qualification	SEL	FEL	KEL	TTE
1	Selangor	6	3	1	2	6	7	−1	10	Advance to knockout phase	—	0–0	0–3	2–1
2	FELDA United	6	2	3	1	10	7	+3	9	Advance to knockout phase	3–2	—	2–2	3–0
3	Kelantan	6	2	2	2	10	8	+2	8		0–1	1–1	—	3–1
4	T–Team	6	2	0	4	7	11	−4	6		0–1	2–1	3–1	—

Source: FAM Astro Arena

=== Group D ===
Pos	Team	Pld	W	D	L	GF	GA	GD	Pts	Qualification	PKNS	PAH	PEN	PDRM
1	PKNS	6	3	2	1	12	5	+7	11	Advance to knockout phase	—	0–2	1–1	0–3
2	Pahang	6	3	1	2	11	11	0	10	Advance to knockout phase	1–4	—	0–0	4–3
3	Penang	6	1	3	2	10	11	−1	6		0–3	4–1	—	2–3
4	PDRM	6	1	2	3	10	16	−6	5		1–1	0–3	3–3	—

Source: FAM Astro Arena

== Knockout stage ==
In the knockout phase, teams played against each other over two legs on a home-and-away basis, except for the one-match final. The mechanism of the draws for each round was as follows:

- In the draw for the quarter final, the fourth group winners were seeded, and the fourth group runners-up were unseeded. The seeded teams were drawn against the unseeded teams, with the seeded teams hosting the second leg. Teams from the same group or the same association could not be drawn against each other.
- In the draws for the quarter-finals onwards, there were no seedings, and teams from the same group or the same association could be drawn against each other.

=== Bracket ===
Quarter-finals
A1	(Singapore) LionsXII	1	2	3
D2	Pahang	4	0	4
C1	Selangor	2	1	3
B2	Sarawak	1	1	2
B1	Johor Darul Ta'zim	1	1	2
C2	FELDA United	1	2	3
D1	PKNS	1	1	2
A2	Kedah	1	3	4

Semi-final
Pahang	0	0	0
Selangor	0	2	2
FELDA United	2	1	3
Kedah	2	2	4

final
Selangor	2
Kedah	0

=== Quarter-finals ===
The first legs were played on 24 November, and the second legs were played on 28 November 2015.

Team 1	Agg.	Team 2	1st leg	2nd leg
Pahang	4–3	(Singapore) LionsXII	4–1	0–2
Sarawak	2–3	Selangor	1–2	1–1
FELDA United	3–2	Johor Darul Ta'zim	1–1	2–1
Kedah	4–2	PKNS	1–1	3–1

=== Semi-finals ===
The first legs were played on 2 December, and the second legs were played on 6 December 2015.

Team 1	Agg.	Team 2	1st leg	2nd leg
Pahang	0–2	Selangor	0–0	0–2
FELDA United	3–4	Kedah	2–2	1–2

=== Final ===
The final was played on 12 December 2015 at the Shah Alam Stadium in Shah Alam, Selangor.

12 December 2015
20:45 UTC+8

Selangor	2–0	Kedah
Hazwan 4', 48'	Report

Shah Alam Stadium, Shah Alam, Selangor
Attendance: 80,000
Referee: Nazmi Nasaruddin

== Statistics ==
=== Top scorers ===
Statistics exclude play-off round.

Rank	Player	Club	Goals
1	(Brazil) Sandro	Kedah	8
1	(Brazil) Thiago Fernandes	Felda United	8
3	(Nigeria) Chidi Edeh	Kedah	7
4	(Brazil) Gilmar	Kelantan	5
4	(Singapore) Safuwan Baharudin	LionsXII	5
4	(Nigeria) Dickson Nwakaeme	Pahang	5
7	(Malaysia) Safiq Rahim	Johor Darul Ta'zim	4
7	(Malaysia) Azamuddin Akil	Pahang	4
7	(Argentina) Gabriel Guerra	PKNS	4
7	(Malaysia) Hazwan Bakri	Selangor	4
11	(Malaysia) Safee Sali	Johor Darul Ta'zim	3
11	(Maldives) Ali Ashfaq	PDRM	3
11	(The Gambia) Mohamadou Sumareh	PDRM	3
11	(Malaysia) Azinee Taib	Penang	3
11	(South Korea) Lee Kil-hoon	Penang	3
11	(Canada) (Japan) Issey Nakajima-Farran	Terengganu	3

== Winners ==
2015 Malaysia Cup Winner
(Selangor)
Selangor
33rd title
