= Ndumba Makeche =

Zambian footballer (born 1992)

Personal information
- Full name: Ndumba Makeche
- Date of birth: 4 March 1992 (age 34)
- Place of birth: Lusaka, Zambia
- Height: 1.83 m (6 ft 0 in)
- Position: Forward

Youth career
- 2011: Perth Glory

Senior career*
Years	Team	Apps	(Gls)
2008–2010	Stirling Lions	25	(12)
2011	Inglewood United	22	(14)
2012–2014	Perth Glory	6	(0)
2014–2015	Felda United	35	(15)
2016	Sarawak	25	(12)
2017–2018	Perlis	7	(4)
2018	South Melbourne	7	(4)
2019	Penang	11	(3)
2020	Gwelup Croatia	11	(12)
2021	Altona Magic	3	(0)
2021–	Bayswater City	36	(24)
- * Club domestic league appearances and goals as of 15 September 2022

Ndumba Makeche is a Zambian professional football player who plays as a forward.

== Early life ==
Makeche was born in Lusaka before emigrating to Australia. He became an Australian citizen in August 2012.

== Club career ==
Shortly after arriving in Western Australia, Makeche joined State league side Stirling Lions where he played three seasons. A 2011 move to Inglewood United brought Makeche the regular first team football he sought, while his knack for finding the back of the net lead to a youth team deal with Perth Glory.

=== Perth Glory ===
In 2011, he signed a youth contract with A-League club Perth Glory. He made his professional debut in the 2011–12 A-League season on 18 March 2012 in a round 26 clash against Gold Coast United at the Skilled Park.

On 1 May 2012, it was announced he had signed a two-year senior contract with Perth Glory.

=== FELDA United ===
On 28 February 2014, after reaching a mutual agreement with Perth Glory, Makeche signed with Malaysian club FELDA United.

=== Sarawak ===
Makeche was revealed as the newest signing by Malaysian league side CF Sarawak in mid-December 2015 for 2016 Malaysia Super League.

=== South Melbourne ===
Makeche returned to Australia, signing for the remainder for the 2018 NPL season for South Melbourne. On 10 June 2018, he made his debut as a 71st-minute substitute against Dandenong Thunder, and scored the final goal in a 4–0 win, after being on the pitch for just 4 minutes.
