= Mohamed Borji =

Moroccan football player

Personal information
- Full name: Mohamed Borji
- Date of birth: 30 January 1981 (age 45)
- Place of birth: Casablanca, Morocco
- Height: 1.86 m (6 ft 1 in)
- Position: Striker

Team information
- Current team: Bandari FC (manager)

Senior career*
Years	Team	Apps	(Gls)
2003–2004	Association Salé	13	(1)
2004–2006	Wydad Casablanca		
2007–2008	FAR Rabat	3	
2008–2009	OC Safi		
2009–2010	CS Hammam-Lif	3	
2010–2011	Difaa El Jadida		
2011–2012	Raja Beni Mellal		
2013	Pahang FA	12	(4)
2013–2014	Wydad Casablanca		

International career
2004	Morocco		
- * Club domestic league appearances and goals

Mohamed Borji (Arabic: محمد بورجي; born 30 January 1981) is a former Moroccan football player who last played as a striker for Wydad Casablanca, after joining Pahang FA in Malaysia.

Mohamed Borji featured in the CAF Champions League with FAR Rabat.
