= Thiago Augusto =

Brazilian-born Bahraini footballer

Personal information
- Full name: Thiago Augusto Fernandes
- Date of birth: May 20, 1990 (age 36)
- Place of birth: Joinville, Brazil
- Height: 1.85 m (6 ft 1 in)
- Position: Striker

Team information
- Current team: Al-Khaldiya
- Number: 90

Youth career
- 2009: Maringá Futebol Clube

Senior career*
Years	Team	Apps	(Gls)
2011–2013	Operário	7	(1)
2013–2015	Manama Club	21	(13)
2015–2016	Felda United	12	(12)
2016	→ Kedah (loan)	7	(4)
2017	Manama Club	12	(6)
2017–2018	Felda United	44	(39)
2019	Manama Club	10	(12)
2019–2021	Al-Muharraq	15	(7)
2021–2022	Al Bataeh		
2022–2023	Al–Hidd		(4)
2024–2025	Al–Riffa		
2025–	Al-Khaldiya		

International career^{‡}
2008–2009	Brazil U19	3	(2)
2019–	Bahrain	5	(2)
- * Club domestic league appearances and goals as of 27 November 2019 ‡ National team caps and goals as of 8 December 2019

Thiago Augusto Fernandes (born 20 May 1990) is a professional footballer who plays as a striker for Bahraini Premier League club Al-Riffa. Born in Brazil, Augusto represents the Bahrain national football team internationally.

== Club career ==
Thiago Augusto started playing football in Grêmio de Esportes Maringá, then to Maringá Futebol Clube and Operário Ferroviário Esporte Clube, all in his home country, Brazil.

=== Manama Club ===
He was then transferred to Manama Club in Bahrain.

=== Felda United ===
In April 2015, Thiago Augusto was transferred to Felda United in Malaysia. He plays under the squad number 49. He has played 10 matches and scored 13 goals. Thiago was the topscorer for the club during 2015 season. He have a sharp finishing, great individual skill and great header. Coupling with Zah Rahan Krangar often intimidating opponent.

Just before the 2016 season kicked off, Thiago suffered a lengthy injury that sidelined him from then Felda United head coach Irfan Bakti Abu Salim's squad, although the club still kept Thiago under contract. But when the mid-season transfer window opened, Irfan decided against listing him in the competitions squad to avoid disrupting the already-established team dynamics, and loaned him out to Kedah. Despite helping Kedah lift the Malaysia Cup title at the end of the season, Thiago was not retained by either Kedah or Felda, and briefly rejoined his other former club Manama.

=== Kedah ===
In July 2016, he was loaned out to Kedah from Felda United. His arrival saw another Kedah player, Ahmad Fakri Saarani moved to Felda United for the remaining campaign of the Malaysia Super League 2016 season, in an exchange deal between the two football teams. This move saw Thiago teamed up with his compatriot, Sandro da Silva Mendonça.

He made his debut also marked with his debut goal on 13 July 2016 against Sarawak in Malaysian Cup, the winning goal in a 4–3 result.

=== Felda United ===
In June 2017, Thiago return to Malaysian football as he re-signed to Felda United for a second stint as replacement for the underperforming Argentine Gastón Cellerino, having played for them from 2015 to 2016.

=== Manama Club ===
He rejoined his former Bahraini club Manama at 2019 after Felda United not extend his contract in 2018.

=== Al Muharraq ===
He transferred to Al-Muharraq in July 2019.

== International career ==
Thiago Augusto had represented Brazil U20 team, but was not included in the final squad of the 2009 South American U-20 Championship, where Brazil emerged champions and qualified for the 2009 FIFA U-20 World Cup, He was also not included for the latter tournament.

=== Bahrain national team ===
On 23 November 2019, Helio Sousa, Bahrain's national team manager, announced that Augusto will join the national team for the 24th Arabian Gulf Cup. He was subsequently naturalized granting him Bahraini citizenship. His debut for Bahrain was in the tournament playing against Oman making him the first Brazilian player to represent Bahrain in the national team. He scored his first two international goals against Kuwait in a 4–2 win, advancing Bahrain to the semi-finals of the tournament. Bahrain eventually won the Gulf Cup for the first time after a 1–0 win over Saudi Arabia in the final.

== Career statistics ==
=== Club ===
As of 21 July 2018.

Appearances and goals by club, season and competition
Club	Season	League			Cup		League Cup		Continental		Total	
Club	Season	Division	Apps	Goals	Apps	Goals	Apps	Goals	Apps	Goals	Apps	Goals
FELDA United	2015	Malaysia Super League	12	5	0	0	10	8	–		22	13
FELDA United	2016	Malaysia Super League	0	0	0	0	0	0	–		0	0
FELDA United	Total		12	5	0	0	10	8	–		22	13
Kedah (loan)	2016	Malaysia Super League	7	4	0	0	9	5	–		16	9
Kedah (loan)	Total		7	4	0	0	9	5	–		16	9
Manama Club	2017–18	Bahraini Premier League	12	6	0	0	0	0	–		12	6
Manama Club	Total		12	6	0	0	0	0	–		12	6
FELDA United	2017	Malaysia Super League	9	14	0	0	9	4	–		18	18
FELDA United	2018	Malaysia Premier League	19	14	4	4	0	0	–		23	18
FELDA United	Total		30	28	4	4	9	4	–		41	36
Career Total			0	0	0	0	0	0	–	–	0	0

=== International ===
As of 8 December 2019

Bahrain
Year	Apps	Goals
2019	5	2
Total	5	2

==== International goals ====
Scores and results list Bahrain's goal tally first.

No.	Date	Venue	Opponent	Score	Result	Competition
1.	2 December 2019	Khalifa International Stadium, Doha, Qatar	Kuwait	3–1	4–2	24th Arabian Gulf Cup
2.	2 December 2019	Khalifa International Stadium, Doha, Qatar	Kuwait	4–2	4–2	24th Arabian Gulf Cup

== Honours ==
=== Club ===
==== Kedah FA ====
- Malaysia Cup

(gold) Winners (1): 2016

==== Felda United ====
- Malaysia Super League

(bronze) Third place (1): 2017

- Malaysia Premier League

(gold) Winners (1): 2018

=== Country ===
==== Bahrain ====
- Arabian Gulf Cup

(gold) Winners (1): 2019
