= 2015 Malaysia Cup knockout stage =

The 2015 Malaysia Cup knockout phase began on 24 November 2015 and concluded on 12 December 2015 with the final at Shah Alam Stadium in Selangor, Malaysia to decide the champions of the 2015 Malaysia Cup. A total of 8 teams competed in the knockout phase.

== Round and draw dates ==
The draw for the 2015 Malaysia Cup was held on 27 August 2015 at the Hilton Petaling Jaya with the participating team coaches and captains in attendance.

Phase	Round	Draw date	First leg	Second leg
Play-off	Play-off round		25 August 2015	
Group stage	Matchday 1	27 August 2015 (Kuala Lumpur)	11–12 September 2015	
Group stage	Matchday 2	27 August 2015 (Kuala Lumpur)	18–19 September 2015	
Group stage	Matchday 3	27 August 2015 (Kuala Lumpur)	26 September 2015	
Group stage	Matchday 4	27 August 2015 (Kuala Lumpur)	2–3 & 17 & 24 October 2015	
Group stage	Matchday 5	27 August 2015 (Kuala Lumpur)	17 & 27 October & 4 November 2015	
Group stage	Matchday 6	27 August 2015 (Kuala Lumpur)	4 & 21 November 2015	
Knockout phase	Quarter-finals	27 August 2015 (Kuala Lumpur)	24 November 2015	28 November 2015
Knockout phase	Semi-finals	27 August 2015 (Kuala Lumpur)	2 December 2015	6 December 2015
Knockout phase	Final	27 August 2015 (Kuala Lumpur)	12 December 2015	

== Format ==
The knockout phase involved the eight teams which qualified as winners and runners-up of each of the eight groups in the group stage.

Each tie in the knockout phase, apart from the final, was played over two legs, with each team playing one leg at home. The team that scored more goals on aggregate over the two legs advanced to the next round. If the aggregate score was level, the away goals rule was applied, i.e. the team that scored more goals away from home over the two legs advanced. If away goals were also equal, then thirty minutes of extra time was played. The away goals rule was again applied after extra time, i.e. if there were goals scored during extra time and the aggregate score was still level, the visiting team advanced by virtue of more away goals scored. If no goals were scored during extra time, the tie was decided by penalty shoot-out. In the final, which was played as a single match, if scores were level at the end of normal time, extra time was played, followed by penalty shoot-out if scores remained tied.

The mechanism of the draws for each round was as follows:

- In the draw for the quarter-final, the four group winners were seeded, and the four group runners-up were unseeded. The seeded teams were drawn against the unseeded teams, with the seeded teams hosting the second leg. Teams from the same group or the same association could not be drawn against each other.
- In the draws for the quarter-finals onwards, there were no seedings, and teams from the same group or the same association could be drawn against each other.

== Qualified teams ==
Group	Winners (Seeded in quarter final draw)	Runners-up (Unseeded in quarter final draw)
A	(Singapore) LionsXII	Kedah
B	Johor Darul Ta'zim	Sarawak
C	Selangor	FELDA United
D	PKNS	Pahang

== Bracket ==
Quarter-finals
A1	(Singapore) LionsXII	1	2	3
D2	Pahang	4	0	4
C1	Selangor	2	1	3
B2	Sarawak	1	1	2
B1	Johor Darul Ta'zim	1	1	2
C2	FELDA United	1	2	3
D1	PKNS	1	1	2
A2	Kedah	1	3	4

Semi-final
Pahang	0	0	0
Selangor	0	2	2
FELDA United	2	1	3
Kedah	2	2	4

final
Selangor	2
Kedah	0

== Quarter-finals ==
The first legs were played on 24 November, and the second legs were played on 28 November 2015.

Team 1	Agg.	Team 2	1st leg	2nd leg
Pahang	4–3	(Singapore) LionsXII	4–1	0–2
Sarawak	2–3	Selangor	1–2	1–1
FELDA United	3–2	Johor Darul Ta'zim	1–1	2–1
Kedah	4–2	PKNS	1–1	3–1

First leg

24 November 2015
20:45 UTC+8

Pahang	4–1	(Singapore) LionsXII
Hafiz 6'; Conti 54'; Nwakaeme 59'; Gopinathan 67'	Report	Safuwan 90+3'

Darulmakmur Stadium, Kuantan
Attendance: 11,316
Referee: Nafeez Abd Wahab

Second leg

28 November 2015
20:45 UTC+8

LionsXII (Singapore)	2–0	Pahang
van Huizen 12'; Faris 18'	Report

Jalan Besar Stadium, Kallang, Singapore
Attendance: 5,898
Referee: Zamzaidi Katimin

Pahang won 4–3 on aggregate.

First leg

24 November 2015
20:45 UTC+8

Sarawak	1–2	Selangor
Mehmet 59'	Report	Hazwan 35'; Afiq 89'

Sarawak State Stadium, Kuching
Attendance: 7,063
Referee: Ahmad Zuhadi Dzulkifli

Second leg

28 November 2015
20:45 UTC+8

Selangor	1–1	Sarawak
Afiq 28'	Report	Ashri 22'

Shah Alam Stadium, Shah Alam
Attendance: 10,000
Referee: Syed Azhar Syed Kamar

Selangor won 3–2 on aggregate.

First leg

24 November 2015
20:45 UTC+8

FELDA United	1–1	Johor Darul Ta'zim
Thiago 8'	Report	Amirul 90+3'

Majlis Perbandaran Selayang Stadium, Selayang
Attendance: 3,799
Referee: Amirul Izwan Yaacob

Second leg

28 November 2015
20:45 UTC+8

Johor Darul Ta'zim	1–2	FELDA United
Safiq 50'	Report	Thiago 4' (pen.); Zah Rahan 76'

Tan Sri Dato' Haji Hassan Yunos Stadium, Larkin
Attendance: 23,410
Referee: Nazmi Nasaruddin

FELDA United won 3–2 on aggregate.

First leg

24 November 2015
20:45 UTC+8

Kedah	1–1	PKNS
Syazwan 75'	Report	Pedro 86'

Darulaman Stadium, Alor Setar
Attendance: 25,000
Referee: S. Sittharanjanan

Second leg

28 November 2015
20:45 UTC+8

PKNS	1–3	Kedah
Pedro 58'	Report	Edeh 29'; Sandro 57'; Syafiq 90+3'

Majlis Perbandaran Selayang Stadium, Selayang
Attendance: 6,850
Referee: Samsudin Ibrahim

Kedah won 4–2 on aggregate.

== Semi-finals ==
The first legs were played on 2 December, and the second legs were played on 6 December 2015.

Team 1	Agg.	Team 2	1st leg	2nd leg
Pahang	0–2	Selangor	0–0	0–2
FELDA United	3–4	Kedah	2–2	1–2

First leg

2 December 2015
20:45 UTC+8

Pahang	0–0	Selangor
	Report

Darulmakmur Stadium, Kuantan
Attendance: 26,420
Referee: Syed Azhar Syed Kamar

Second leg

6 December 2015
20:45 UTC+8

Selangor	2–0	Pahang
Guilherme 11'; Nazmi 54'	Report

Shah Alam Stadium, Shah Alam
Attendance: 47,436
Referee: Amirul Izwan Yaacob

Selangor won 2–0 on aggregate.

First leg

2 December 2015
20:45 UTC+8

FELDA United	2–2	Kedah
Thiago 14', 55'	Report	Sandro 37'; Edeh 63'

Majlis Perbandaran Selayang Stadium, Selayang
Attendance: 8,800
Referee: Zohri Tajuddin

Second leg

6 December 2015
20:45 UTC+8

Kedah	2–1	FELDA United
Edeh 44'; Sandro 51'	Report	Syamim 39'

Darulaman Stadium, Alor Setar
Attendance: 30,000
Referee: Zamzaidi Katimin

Kedah won 4–3 on aggregate.

== Final ==
The final will be played on 12 December 2015 at the Shah Alam Stadium in Selangor, Malaysia.

12 December 2015
20:45 UTC+8

Selangor	2–0	Kedah
Hazwan 4', 48'	Report

Shah Alam Stadium, Shah Alam
Attendance: 80,000
Referee: Nazmi Nasaruddin
