= Abdulafees Abdulsalam =

Nigerian football player

Personal information
- Full name: Abdulafees Abdulsalam
- Date of birth: 13 April 1984 (age 42)
- Place of birth: Lagos, Nigeria
- Height: 1.77 m (5 ft 10 in)
- Position: Forward

Youth career
- Mutunchi Academy

Senior career*
Years	Team	Apps	(Gls)
2002–2003	NITEL Vasco Da Gama F.C.	14	(7)
2003–2004	Mogas 90 FC	22	(12)
2004–2007	Shahzan Muda F.C.	73	(53)
2007–2008	Al-Arabi (UAE)	5	(3)
2008–2009	Al Jazira Club	10	(3)
2009	Yanbian	20	(5)
2010	Al Hala SC	10	(10)
2010–2011	El Jaish SC	15	(11)
2011–2012	Hidd SCC	17	(14)
2012–2013	Al Sḥamal SCC	15	(10)
2013–2014	Hidd SCC	26	(18)
2014–2015	Perak FC	33	(21)
2015–2016	ATM FA	28	(11)
2017	Magwe F.C.	13	(10)
Total		302	(184)

International career
2001	Nigeria U-17		
- * Club domestic league appearances and goals as of 14 May 2014

Abdulafees Abdulsalam (born 13 April 1984) is a Nigerian football player. He is an attacking player who can play striker based on his physical capability and football sense.

Abdulafees has played for clubs in Nigeria, Benin, China, Malaysia, and the Middle East.

In the second transfer window of the 2014 Malaysia Super League in April 2014, he joined Perak FA after a successful trial.

He was a part of the Nigeria U17 in 2001 African U-17 Championship, who finished as the first rank in Group A, making it through to the next round, before winning gold medal in Seychelles

== Honours ==
=== Club ===
Al-Hidd

- Bahraini King's Cup: 2015
- Bahraini FA Cup: 2014–15

Magwe

- General Aung San Shield: 2017

=== Individual ===
- Qatar Second Division Top Scorer: 2011–12 (with Al-Shamal)
- Bahraini Premier League Top Scorer: 2012–13 (with Al-Hidd)
- Malaysia Super League "Player of the Month": May 2014

=== Club ===
Qatar 2nd Division League Winners, Highest Goal Scorer - 2011

Qatar 2nd Division FA Cup winner, Highest Goal Scorer - 2011

Sheikh Jasim Cup, Qatar, Highest Goal Scorer - 2011

Bahrain Premier League, 2nd Highest Goal Scorer - 2010

China Premier League, 3rd Highest Goal Scorer - 2009

Malaysia Premier League, 2nd Top Scorer and Shahzan muda FC Top Scorer- 2006–2007

MVP - Shahzan Muda FC 2005–2006

Malaysia Premier League 2nd Top Scorer and Shahzan Muda FC Top Scorer- 2005–2006

Promotion to Premier League - 2005

League Champion: Shahzan Muda FC - Malaysia Premier II (Promoted to Div1).2004-2005

League Champion: Mogart 90 FC - Benin Republic Div. 1 - 2003–2004

League 2nd Finish: Nitel FC, Nigeria Pro Div. 1 League - 2002–2003

Champion of Africa: U-17 Nation Cup - 20

== Personal life and legacy ==
After retiring from professional football in 2018 following a stint in the Myanmar National League, Abdulsalam chose to settle permanently in Malaysia. He is married to a local Malaysian woman, and the couple has four children.

Abdulsalam's footballing legacy in Malaysia continues through his son, **Ibrahim Abdulafees**, who is a professional prospect. Ibrahim currently plays for the Sri Pahang FC President's Cup (U21) squad. In June 2024, Ibrahim gained media attention after scoring the winning goal for Sri Pahang in a 1–0 victory over Penang FC III.
