= 2018 Malaysia FA Cup final =

- The match programme cover
- Event: 2018 Malaysia FA Cup
Selangor	Pahang
0	2
- Date: 7 July 2018
- Venue: Bukit Jalil National Stadium, Kuala Lumpur
- Man of the Match: Mohamadou Sumareh (Pahang)
- Referee: Zulkarnain Zakaria
- Attendance: 43,512

The 2018 Malaysia FA Cup final was the 29th final of the Malaysia FA Cup, the Malaysia football cup competition. Pahang won the cup after defeating Selangor 2–0.

== Background ==
The final was played on 7 July 2018 at Bukit Jalil National Stadium.

== Route to the final ==
Note: In all results below, the score of the finalist is given first.

=== Selangor ===
Round	Opposition	Score
First Round	Bye	
Second Round	MOF (a)	3–0
Third Round	Terengganu (a)	3–1
Quarter-finals	Kuala Lumpur (1st leg) (a)	3–0
Quarter-finals	Kuala Lumpur (2nd leg) (h)	0–3
Semi-final	PKNS (1st leg) (h)	4–0
Semi-final	PKNS (2nd leg) (a)	1–1
Key: (h) = Home venue; (a) = Away venue.

=== Pahang ===
Round	Opposition	Score
First Round	Bye	
Second Round	ATM (h)	2–1
Third Round	Kedah (h)	1–0
Quarter-finals	Johor Darul Ta'zim (1st leg) (h)	0–0
Quarter-finals	Johor Darul Ta'zim (2nd leg) (a)	3–0
Semi-final	PKNP (1st leg) (h)	1–1
Semi-final	PKNP (2nd leg) (a)	2–1
Key: (h) = Home venue; (a) = Away venue.

== Ticket allocation ==
Each club received an allocation of 80,000 tickets; 30,750 tickets for Selangor, 30,750 tickets for Pahang and 18,500 tickets for online purchase.

== Rules ==
The final was played as a single match. If tied after regulation, extra time and, if necessary, penalty shoot-out would be used to decide the winner.

== Match ==
=== Details ===
7 July 2018
21:00 (UTC+8)

Selangor	0–2	Pahang
		23' Azam Azih; 62' (pen.) Patrick Cruz

Bukit Jalil National Stadium, Kuala Lumpur
Attendance: 43,512
Referee: Zulkarnain Zakaria

Selangor	Pahang

GK	1	(Malaysia) Khairulazhan Khalid
RB	5	(Malaysia) Amirul Ashraf
CB	13	(Malaysia) Razman Roslan	(yellow card) 75'
CB	14	(Spain) Alfonso de la Cruz	(yellow card) 61'
LB	3	(Malaysia) Kannan Kalaiselvan		(substituted off) 89'
RM	17	(Malaysia) Amri Yahyah (c)	(yellow card) 28'
CM	8	(Malaysia) Saiful Ridzuwan
LM	20	(Malaysia) Syahmi Safari		(substituted off) 71'
RW	30	(Malaysia) Kugan Dhevarajan		(substituted off) 57'
CF	10	(Spain) Rufino Segovia
LW	18	(Indonesia) Ilham Armaiyn
Substitutes:
DF	2	(Malaysia) Arunasalam Namathevan
MF	4	(Malaysia) Abdul Halim Zainal
MF	6	(Indonesia) Evan Dimas		(substituted on) 57'
FW	12	(Malaysia) Azamuddin Akil		(substituted on) 71'
MF	19	(Malaysia) Joseph Kalang Tie		(substituted on) 89'
GK	21	(Malaysia) Norazlan Razali
DF	24	(Malaysia) Muhd Syukri Azman
Head Coach:
(Malaysia) Nazliazmi Nasir

GK	1	(Malaysia) Helmi Eliza
RB	2	(Malaysia) Matthew Davies (c)
CB	12	(Malaysia) Bunyamin Umar
CB	24	(Malaysia) Muslim Ahmad
LB	14	(Malaysia) Faisal Rosli		(substituted off) 86'
RM	26	(The Gambia) Mohamadou Sumareh		(substituted off) 90'
CM	21	(Singapore) Safuwan Baharudin
CM	20	(Malaysia) Azam Azih	(yellow card) 80'
LM	9	(Malaysia) Norshahrul Idlan
CF	10	(Brazil) Patrick Cruz		(substituted off) 72'
CF	29	(Nigeria) Austin Amutu
Substitutes:
DF	4	(Malaysia) R. Dinesh
MF	7	(Malaysia) Faisal Halim		(substituted on) 90'
MF	8	(Malaysia) Wan Zaharulnizam		(substituted on) 72'
DF	16	(Malaysia) Zubir Azmi		(substituted on) 86'
GK	22	(Malaysia) Remezey Che Ros
MF	23	(Malaysia) Salomon Raj
FW	28	(Malaysia) Kogileswaran Raj
Head Coach:
(Malaysia) Dollah Salleh

Man of the Match:
Mohamadou Sumareh (Pahang)

Match rules

- 90 minutes
- 30 minutes of extra time if necessary
- Penalty shoot-out if scores still level
- Seven named substitutes, of which up to three may be used
