= 2020 Selangor F.C. season =

2020 season of Malaysian association football club

Selangor
2020 season
- President: Tengku Amir Shah
- Manager: Mahfizul Rusydin
- Head coach: B. Sathianathan (until 21 September); Michael Feichtenbeiner (from 21 September as caretaker)
- Stadium: 1. Bukit Jalil National Stadium; 2. UiTM Stadium; (League competitions); 3. Hang Jebat Stadium (Malaysia Cup competitions)
- Super League: 5th
- FA Cup: Second round (Note: Due to the COVID-19 pandemic in Malaysia, the tournament was cancelled.)
- Malaysia Cup: Quarter-finals (Note: Due to the COVID-19 pandemic in Malaysia, the tournament format was changed. The group stage competition was cancelled and replaced by a knockout competition. On 12 November 2020, the tournament was cancelled immediately.)
- Top goalscorer: League: (12 goals); Ifedayo Olusegun; All: (13 goals); Ifedayo Olusegun
- Highest home attendance: 18,679; Super League; Selangor vs Perak (7 March 2020)
- Average home league attendance: 3,736
- Biggest win: 7–0 vs PDRM (A), 3 October 2020, Super League
- Biggest defeat: 1–6 vs Johor Darul Ta'zim (A), 19 September 2020, Super League
Home colours	Away colours	Third colours

The 2020 season was Selangor's 15th season in the Super League and their 35th consecutive season in the top flight of Malaysia football. The club also participated in the Malaysia Cup and the FA Cup. During this season, Selangor played all their home fixtures on different venues, following the original ground Shah Alam Stadium was unavailable used due to safety concerns and undergoing renovations.

== Review ==
This is Selangor second season under head coach B. Sathianathan, who took permanent charge in March 2019. It is also the first season since 2018 without club captain Amri Yahyah, who left the club at the end of the 2019 season. B. Sathianathan named Taylor Regan as Amri's successor as club captain. Selangor will begin the season on 29 February 2020.

On 13 March, it was announced that the league would be suspended indefinitely, due to the ongoing COVID-19 pandemic. On 1 May, it was announced that the league would resume in September dependent on the situation at the time. If the M-League is not allowed to resume in September, the season will be called off. Due to time constraints, the home-and-away format for the Super League and the Premier League has been scrapped. Teams will now play each other only once, meaning the champions of the Super League and Premier League will be decided after 11 rounds of matches.

Following Shah Alam Stadium's closing due to safety issues and undergoing renovations, Selangor played the entire season in three different venues, Bukit Jalil National Stadium, UiTM Stadium and Hang Jebat Stadium as their temporary home ground.

On 21 September 2020, Coach B. Sathianathan have been sacked by the club, just days after their 6–1 Malaysia Super League humiliation at the hands of Johor Darul Ta'zim (JDT). Following that, the role will be filled in by the Technical Director, Michael Feichtenbeiner as interim head coach until the new head coach is announced.

On 2 October 2020, the club have made application to privatize its football team under a new entity as Selangor Football Club (Selangor FC), and was officially approved by the Football Association of Malaysia (FAM) on 29 September 2020.

Recently, the Malaysian Football League (MFL) format for the 2020 Malaysia Cup has been changed following the COVID-19 pandemic that hit the country. Group stage competitions were cancelled and replaced with 16 teams by knockout, including matches in the quarter-finals and semi-finals. On 12 November 2020, MFL confirmed that the tournament would not resume and be cancelled immediately. That mean's closes the season for Malaysian football in 2020 following government's rejection of MFL's appeal, including with large parts of the country in Conditional Movement Control Order (CMCO) due to COVID-19 pandemic.

== Squad information ==
=== First-team squad ===
Squad No.	Name	Nationality	Position(s)	Date of birth (age)
Goalkeepers
1	Khairulazhan Khalid	(Malaysia)	GK	7 November 1989 (aged 31)
25	Tauffiq Ar Rasyid	(Malaysia)	GK	14 December 1995 (aged 24)
30	Farizal Harun	(Malaysia)	GK	2 February 1986 (aged 34)
Defenders
3	Rodney Celvin	(Malaysia) (Ghana)	CB	25 November 1996 (aged 23)
4	Ashmawi Yakin	(Malaysia)	RB / RWB / CB	1 January 1994 (aged 26)
5	Taylor Regan	(Australia)	CB	16 November 1988 (aged 31)
19	K. Prabakaran	(Malaysia)	CB / LB / DM	30 May 1991 (aged 29)
20	Syahmi Safari	(Malaysia)	RB / RWB / RM / LM	5 February 1998 (aged 22)
23	Nicholas Swirad	(Malaysia) (England)	CB	28 May 1991 (aged 29)
26	A. Namathevan	(Malaysia)	RB / RWB	26 July 1996 (aged 24)
27	M. Tamil Maran	(Malaysia)	CB / DM	16 September 1997 (aged 23)
Midfielders
6	K. Sarkunan	(Malaysia)	DM / CM	4 August 1996 (aged 24)
7	Sean Selvaraj	(Malaysia)	RW / LW / RM / LM	11 April 1996 (aged 24)
8	Khyril Muhymeen	(Malaysia)	RM / RW / LM / CAM	9 May 1987 (aged 33)
17	Hakim Hassan	(Malaysia)	CM / AM / LW / LM	2 October 1991 (aged 29)
18	Halim Saari	(Malaysia)	DM / CM	14 November 1994 (aged 25)
21	Safuwan Baharudin	(Singapore)	DM / CB / CM / CF	22 September 1991 (aged 29)
22	Syazwan Zainon	(Malaysia)	LW / LM / RW / RM	13 November 1989 (aged 30)
88	Brendan Gan	(Malaysia) (Australia)	CM / DM / AM	3 June 1988 (aged 32)
Forwards
10	Rufino Segovia	(Spain)	ST / LW / CAM	1 March 1985 (aged 35)
11	Wan Zack Haikal	(Malaysia)	LW / RW / CF / CAM	28 January 1991 (aged 29)
12	Ifedayo Olusegun	(Nigeria)	ST / LW / RW	14 January 1991 (aged 29)
50	Sandro	(Brazil)	ST / CF / CAM	1 October 1983 (aged 37)
Out on loan
—	Amirul Ashraf	(Malaysia)	CB	22 January 1998 (aged 22)

=== Reserve team squad ===
Squad No.	Name	Nationality	Position(s)	Date of birth (age)
Selangor II, III & IV
—	Haziq Ridwan	(Malaysia)	GK	11 January 1996 (aged 24)
—	Amirul Haziq	(Malaysia)	CB	19 March 1998 (aged 22)
—	Badrul Amin	(Malaysia)	ST / CF	24 July 1997 (aged 23)
—	Quentin Cheng	(Australia) (Malaysia)	RB / RWB	20 November 1999 (aged 20)
29	Azizul Baharuddin	(Malaysia)	ST / CF	27 February 1998 (aged 22)
32	Mukhairi Ajmal	(Malaysia)	CM / LW / LM / AM	7 November 2001 (aged 19)
33	Azrin Afiq	(Malaysia)	CB / LB	1 January 2002 (aged 18)
35	Zahril Azri	(Malaysia)	DM / CM	4 February 1999 (aged 21)
36	Anwar Ibrahim	(Malaysia)	RB / LB	10 June 1999 (aged 21)
42	Aliff Haiqal	(Malaysia)	CM / AM	11 July 2000 (aged 20)
43	Zikri Khalili	(Malaysia)	LB / RB	25 June 2002 (aged 18)
46	Danial Asri	(Malaysia)	CF / LW	1 April 2000 (aged 20)

=== Other players under contract ===
Squad No.	Name	Nationality	Position(s)	Date of birth (age)
—	Faizzudin Abidin	(Malaysia)	RW / LW / AM	26 May 1996 (aged 24)

== Transfers ==
=== Transfers in ===
Date	No.	Pos.	Name	Age	Moving from	Type	Transfer fee	Team	Ref.
15 November 2019	—	DF	(Malaysia) K. Kannan	23	(Malaysia) PKNS	Loan return	N/A	First team	N/A
15 November 2019	—	DF	(Malaysia) Amirul Ashraf	21	(Malaysia) UiTM	Loan return	N/A	Reserve team	N/A
15 November 2019	—	MF	(Malaysia) Faizzudin Abidin	23	(Malaysia) Penang	Loan return	N/A	First team	N/A
15 November 2019	—	MF	(Malaysia) Asraff Hayqal	22	(Malaysia) UiTM	Loan return	N/A	First team	N/A
29 November 2019	3	DF	(Malaysia) Rodney Celvin	23	(Malaysia) PKNS	Contract expired	Free transfer	First team	
1 December 2019	88	MF	(Malaysia) Brendan Gan	31	(Malaysia) Perak	Contract expired	Free transfer	First team	
4 December 2019	17	MF	(Malaysia) Hakim Hassan	28	(Malaysia) Perak	Contract expired	Free transfer	First team	
8 December 2019	25	GK	(Malaysia) Tauffiq Ar Rasyid	23	(Malaysia) PKNS	Contract expired	Free transfer	First team	
10 December 2019	23	DF	(Malaysia) Nicholas Swirad	28	(Malaysia) PKNS	Contract expired	Free transfer	First team	
11 December 2019	21	DF	(Singapore) Safuwan Baharudin	28	(Malaysia) Pahang	Contract expired	Free transfer	First team	
25 December 2019	32	MF	(Malaysia) Mukhairi Ajmal	18	(Malaysia) PKNP	Contract expired	Free transfer	Reserve team	
1 January 2020	36	DF	(Malaysia) Anwar Ibrahim	20	(Malaysia) FELDA United	Contract expired	Free transfer	Reserve team	
11 February 2020	—	DF	(Malaysia) Quentin Cheng	20	(Australia) Sutherland Sharks	Contract expired	Free transfer	Reserve team	

=== Transfers out ===
Date	No.	Pos.	Name	Age	Moving to	Type	Transfer fee	Team	Ref.
16 November 2019	3	DF	(Malaysia) Fandi Othman	27	(Malaysia) Selangor II	End of loan	N/A	First team	
16 November 2019	13	DF	(Malaysia) Latiff Suhaimi	30	(Malaysia) Penang	Contract expired	Free transfer	First team	
16 November 2019	14	MF	(Brazil) Endrick	24	(Malaysia) Penang	Contract expired	Free transfer	First team	
16 November 2019	15	MF	(Malaysia) Faiz Nasir	27	(Malaysia) Terengganu	Contract expired	Free transfer	First team	
16 November 2019	16	MF	(Malaysia) Nurridzuan Abu Hassan	27	(Malaysia) Melaka United	Contract expired	Free transfer	First team	
16 November 2019	21	MF	(Malaysia) Norhakim Isa	26	Free Agent	Contract expired	Free transfer	First team	
16 November 2019	25	DF	(Malaysia) Azreen Zulkafali	30	Free Agent	Contract expired	Free transfer	First team	
16 November 2019	26	DF	(Vietnam) Michal Nguyễn	30	(Vietnam) Hải Phòng	Contract expired	Free transfer	First team	
21 November 2019	17	FW	(Malaysia) Amri Yahyah	38	(Malaysia) Sarawak United	Contract expired	Free transfer	First team	
23 January 2020	24	DF	(Malaysia) Syukri Azman	22	(Malaysia) Sarawak United	Contract expired	Free transfer	First team	
18 February 2020	30	DF	(Malaysia) D. Kugan	23	(Malaysia) Petaling Jaya City	Contract expired	Free transfer	Reserve team	
18 February 2020	–	DF	(Malaysia) K. Kannan	23	(Malaysia) Petaling Jaya City	Contract expired	Free transfer	First team	
18 February 2020	–	DF	(Malaysia) Asraff Hayqal	23	(Malaysia) UiTM	Contract expired	Free transfer	First team	

=== Loans out ===
Date	No.	Pos.	Name	Age	Loaned to	Type	On loan until	Transfer fee	Team	Ref.
18 February 2020	—	DF	(Malaysia) Amirul Ashraf	22	(Malaysia) UiTM	Loan	End of season	N/A	Reserve team	

== Pre-season and friendlies ==
Selangor played a number of pre-season matches in 2020, including participating in the 2020 Asia Cup and Meizhou Hakka Cup.

18 January 2020 2020 Asia Challenge Cup	Persib Bandung (Indonesia)	0–3	(Malaysia) Selangor	Selangor, Malaysia
		Report	Regan 10'; Sandro 41'; Syahmi 45'	Stadium: Shah Alam Stadium

19 January 2020 2020 Asia Challenge Cup	Bangkok United (Thailand)	0–0 (4–2 p)	(Malaysia) Selangor	Selangor, Malaysia
		Report		Stadium: Shah Alam Stadium
	Penalties
	Vander Luiz (penalty scored); Nattawut (penalty missed); Tristan (penalty scored); Manuel (penalty scored); Pokklaw (penalty scored)		Ifedayo (penalty scored); Selvaraj (penalty scored); Zahril (penalty missed); Halim (penalty missed)

26 January 2020 2020 Meizhou Hakka Cup	Meizhou Hakka (China)	Cancelled	(Malaysia) Selangor	Wunhua, Guangzhou
				Stadium: Huitang Stadium
Note: The match has been cancelled due to concerns over the coronavirus pandemic.

28 January 2020 2020 Meizhou Hakka Cup	Chonburi (Thailand) / Sangju Sangmu (South Korea)	Cancelled	(Malaysia) Selangor	Wunhua, Guangzhou
				Stadium: Huitang Stadium
Note: The match has been cancelled due to concerns over the coronavirus pandemic.

== Competitions ==
=== Overall record ===
Competition	First match	Last match	Starting round	Final position	Record							
Competition	First match	Last match	Starting round	Final position	Pld	W	D	L	GF	GA	GD	Win %
Super League	29 February 2020	10 October 2020	Matchday 1	5th	11	4	5	2	26	19	+7	36.36
FA Cup	18 March 2020		Second round	Second round	0	0	0	0	0	0	+0	—
Malaysia Cup	8 November 2020		Round of 16	Quarter-finals	1	1	0	0	2	1	+1	100.00
Total					12	5	5	2	28	20	+8	41.67

Source: Soccerway

=== Super League ===
==== Table ====
Pos	Team	Pld	W	D	L	GF	GA	GD	Pts	Qualification or relegation
3	Terengganu (Q)	11	6	1	4	24	14	+10	19	Qualification for AFC Cup group stage
4	Perak	11	5	3	3	21	19	+2	18	
5	Selangor	11	4	5	2	26	19	+7	17	
6	UiTM	11	5	2	4	17	15	+2	17	
7	Petaling Jaya City	11	3	5	3	17	16	+1	14	

Source: Malaysian Football League
Rules for classification: 1) Points; 2) Goal difference; 3) Number of goals scored.
(Q) Qualified for the phase indicated
Notes:

Source: Super League fixtures and results

==== Results summary ====
Overall								Home						Away					
Pld	W	D	L	GF	GA	GD	Pts	W	D	L	GF	GA	GD	W	D	L	GF	GA	GD
11	4	5	2	26	19	+7	17	1	4	0	11	6	+5	3	1	2	15	13	+2

Source: Super League fixtures and results

=== Results by matchday ===
Win Draw Loss

Round	1	2	3	4	5	6	7	8	9	10	11
Ground	A	H	A	A	H	A	H	A	H	A	H
Result	W	D	D	L	D	W	D	L	D	W	W
Position	3	6	4	7	8	6	6	8	8	5	5

Updated to match(es) played on 7 March 2020. Source: Super League fixtures and results
A = Away; H = Home; W = Win; D = Draw; L = Loss

==== Matches ====
The league fixtures were announced on 3 January 2020.

Win Draw Loss

29 February 2020 1	Pahang	1–2	Selangor	Kuantan, Pahang
21:00 UTC+08:00	Ivan Carlos 20' (yellow card) 76'	Report (2)	Ifedayo 27'; Syazwan (yellow card) 57'; Sandro (yellow card) 84'; Brendan 89'	Stadium: Darul Makmur Stadium; Attendance: 18,774; Referee: Hamdan Awang

7 March 2020 2	Selangor	1–1	Perak	Bukit Jalil, Kuala Lumpur
21:00 UTC+08:00	Ifedayo 31'; Regan (yellow card) 46'	Report (1); Report (2)	Leandro (yellow card) 4'; Shahrel 9'	Stadium: Bukit Jalil National Stadium; Attendance: 18,679; Referee: Mat Zan Abdul Wahab

11 March 2020 3	Terengganu	3–3	Selangor	Kuala Nerus, Terengganu
21:00 UTC+08:00	Rahmat 43' (yellow card) 72'; Shaakhmedov 64'; Azalinullah (yellow card) 79' (yellow-red card) 80'; Tuck 90+4' (pen.)	Report (2)	Regan (yellow card) 6'; Rodney (yellow card) 24'; Ifedayo 39'; Khyril 52'; Brendan 70'	Stadium: Sultan Mizan Zainal Abidin Stadium; Attendance: 17,200; Referee: Amirul Izwan Yaacob

15 March 2020 4	Kedah	2–0	Selangor	Alor Setar, Kedah
21:00 UTC+08:00	Renan Alves 25'; Rizal (yellow card) 35'; Sherman 45'; Shakir (yellow card) 79'; Baddrol (yellow card) 81'	Report (2)	Halim (yellow card) 33'; Syahmi (yellow card) 52'; Rodney (yellow card) 73'	Stadium: Darul Aman Stadium; Attendance: 0 (Note: The match was played behind closed doors due to the COVID-19 pandemic in Malaysia.); Referee: Zamzaidi Katimin

27 August 2020 5	Selangor	0–0	Petaling Jaya City	Shah Alam, Selangor
21:00 UTC+08:00	Ashmawi (yellow card) 15'	Report (1); Report (2)	Kugan (yellow card) 52'; Anyie (yellow card) 72'	Stadium: UiTM Stadium; Attendance: 0 Referee: Fairuzi Mat Desa
Note: The match was postponed on 16 March due to concerns over the coronavirus pandemic, and rescheduled to 27 August.

4 September 2020 6	Sabah	1–2	Selangor	Kota Kinabalu, Sabah
21:00 UTC+08:00	Paunović 65'; Randy (yellow card) 50'	Report (1); Report (2)	Ifedayo 72' 80'; Halim (yellow card) 54'; Syazwan (yellow card) 84'	Stadium: Likas Stadium; Attendance: 215; Referee: Suhaimi Mat Hassan
Note: The match was postponed on 16 March and rescheduled to 4 September.

11 September 2020 7	Selangor	1–1	Melaka United	Shah Alam, Selangor
21:00 UTC+08:00	Prabakaran (yellow card) 27'; Sandro 40'; Syahmi (yellow card) 44'; Safuwan (yellow card) 45+2'; Brendan (yellow card) 59' (yellow-red card) 90+1'	Report (1); Report (2)	Agba 39'; Saiful (yellow card) 45'; Amirul (yellow card) 45+2'	Stadium: UiTM Stadium; Attendance: 0 Referee: Nafeez Abd Wahab
Note: The match was postponed on 16 March due to concerns over the coronavirus pandemic, and rescheduled to 11 September.

19 September 2020 8	Johor Darul Ta'zim	6–1	Selangor	Iskandar Puteri, Johor
21:00 UTC+08:00	Safawi 45+2', 49' (pen.) (yellow card) 57'; Nazmi (yellow card) 45+5'; Diogo 64'; Cabrera 67'; Ramadhan 72', 75'; Syamer (yellow card) 90+2' (yellow-red card) 90+5'	Report (2)	Ashmawi (yellow card) 37'; Swirad (yellow card) 48'; Rufino 81'	Stadium: Sultan Ibrahim Stadium; Attendance: 0 Referee: Zulkarnain Zakaria
Note: The match was postponed on 16 March due to concerns over the coronavirus pandemic, and rescheduled to 19 September.

26 September 2020 9	Selangor	3–3	UiTM	Shah Alam, Selangor
21:00 UTC+08:00	Safuwan (yellow card) 15'; Ifedayo 25', 90+7' (pen.); Regan (yellow card) 40'; Sandro 45+5'; Haiqal (yellow card) 57'; Tamil Maran (yellow card) 90+1'	Report (1); Report (2)	Danish (yellow card) 27'; Arif (yellow card) 44'; Gustavo 49', 59' (yellow card) 82'; Ataya 62'; Nirennold (yellow card) 85'	Stadium: UiTM Stadium; Attendance: 0 Referee: Suhaimi Mat Hassan
Note: The match was postponed on 16 March due to concerns over the coronavirus pandemic, and rescheduled to 26 September.

3 October 2020 10	PDRM	0–7	Selangor	Bandar Tun Razak, Kuala Lumpur
21:00 UTC+08:00	Satish (yellow card) 14'; Alif (yellow card) 71'	Report (1); Report (2)	Ifedayo 20', 74'; Sean 26', 34'; Halim (yellow card) 52'; Brendan 70'; Safuwan 80'; Rufino 83'	Stadium: Kuala Lumpur Stadium; Attendance: 0 Referee: Hasrol Amir
Note: The match was postponed on 16 March due to concerns over the coronavirus pandemic, and rescheduled to 3 October.

10 October 2020 11	Selangor	6–1	FELDA United	Shah Alam, Selangor
21:00 UTC+08:00	Brendan 13'; Safuwan (yellow card) 43'; Ifedayo 45', 62' (pen.), 88'; Sandro 70', 78'; Rodney (yellow card) 83'; Rufino (yellow card) 90+1'	Report (1); Report (2)	Danial 33'; Jasazrin (yellow card) 57'	Stadium: UiTM Stadium; Attendance: 0 Referee: Fitri Maskon
Note: The match was postponed on 16 March due to concerns over the coronavirus pandemic, and rescheduled to 10 October.

==== Results overview ====
Win Draw Loss

Team	Home score	Away score	Double
FELDA United	6–1	—	6–1
Johor Darul Ta'zim	—	1–6	1–6
Kedah	—	0–2	0–2
Melaka United	1–1	—	1–1
Pahang	—	2–1	2–1
PDRM	—	0–7	0–7
Perak	1–1	—	1–1
Petaling Jaya City	0–0	—	0–0
Sabah	—	2–1	2–1
Terengganu	—	3–3	3–3
UiTM	3–3	—	3–3

=== FA Cup ===
Due to the COVID-19 pandemic in Malaysia, the tournament was cancelled.

18 March 2020 Second round	Selangor	Cancelled	Sarawak United	Shah Alam, Selangor
21:00 UTC+08:00				Stadium: UiTM Stadium
Note: The match has been cancelled due to concerns over the coronavirus pandemic.

=== Malaysia Cup ===
8 November 2020 RO16	Selangor	2–1	Melaka United	Krubong, Melaka
21:00 UTC+08:00	Ifedayo 21'; Sandro 52'; Zikri (yellow card) 79'; Khairulazhan (yellow card) 90+1'; Sarkunan (yellow card) 90+5'	Report (1); Report (2)	Annas (yellow card) 16'; Suk-won (yellow card) 19'; Agba 57'	Stadium: Hang Jebat Stadium; Attendance: 0 Referee: Hamdan Awang
Note: Selangor had to play in another state by following the plan through strict compliance with the Standard Operating Procedures (SOP) of COVID-19 by all teams and match officials.

12/13 November 2020 QF	Kedah	Cancelled	Selangor	TBD
21:00 UTC+08:00				Stadium: TBD; Attendance: 0
Note: The match has been cancelled due to concerns over the coronavirus pandemic.

== Statistics ==
=== Squad statistics ===
As of 8 November 2020

Appearances (Apps.) numbers are for appearances in competitive games only including sub appearances.
\ Red card numbers denote: Numbers in parentheses represent red cards overturned for wrongful dismissal.

No.	Nat.	Player	Pos.	Super League				FA Cup				Malaysia Cup				Total			
No.	Nat.	Player	Pos.	Apps	Goal	Yellow card	Red card	Apps	Goal	Yellow card	Red card	Apps	Goal	Yellow card	Red card	Apps	Goal	Yellow card	Red card
1	(Malaysia)	Khairulazhan	GK	9								1		1		10		1	
3	(Malaysia)	Rodney Celvin	DF	8		3										8		3	
4	(Malaysia)	Ashmawi Yakin	DF	5		2										5		2	
5	(Australia)	Taylor Regan	DF	10		3						1				11		3	
6	(Malaysia)	K. Sarkunan	MF	5								1		1		6		1	
7	(Malaysia)	Sean Selvaraj	MF	6	2							1				7	2		
8	(Malaysia)	Khyril Muhymeen	FW	5	1											5	1		
10	(Spain)	Rufino Segovia	FW	11	2	1						1				12	2	1	
11	(Malaysia)	Wan Zack Haikal	FW	6								1				7			
12	(Nigeria)	Ifedayo Olusegun	FW	11	12							1	1			12	13		
17	(Malaysia)	Hakim Hassan	MF																
18	(Malaysia)	Halim Saari	MF	9		3						1				10		3	
19	(Malaysia)	K. Prabakaran	DF	10		1										10		1	
20	(Malaysia)	Syahmi Safari	DF	10		2						1				11		2	
21	(Singapore)	Safuwan Baharudin	MF	11	1	3						1				12	1	3	
22	(Malaysia)	Syazwan Zainon	MF	7		2						1				8		2	
23	(Malaysia)	Nick Swirad	DF	4		1										4		1	
25	(Malaysia)	Tauffiq Ar Rasyid	GK	1												1			
26	(Malaysia)	A. Namathevan	DF	5												5			
27	(Malaysia)	M. Tamil Maran	DF	1		1										1		1	
30	(Malaysia)	Farizal Harun	GK	1												1			
32	(Malaysia)	Mukhairi Ajmal	MF	2												2			
33	(Malaysia)	Azrin Afiq	DF	1												1			
35	(Malaysia)	Zahril Azri	MF	1												1			
36	(Malaysia)	Anwar Ibrahim	DF	1												1			
42	(Malaysia)	Aliff Haiqal	DF	3		1						1				4		1	
43	(Malaysia)	Zikri Khalili	DF	1								1		1		2		1	
46	(Malaysia)	Danial Asri	FW									1				1			
50	(Brazil)	Sandro	FW	11	4	1						1	1			12	5	1	
88	(Malaysia)	Brendan Gan	MF	10	4		1					1				11	4		1
Own goals					0				0				0				0		
Totals					26	24	1		0	0	0		2	3	0		28	27	1

† Player left the club during the season.

=== Goalscorers ===
Includes all competitive matches.

As of match played 8 November 2020

Rank	Pos.	No.	Player	Super League	FA Cup	Malaysia Cup	Total
1	FW	12	(Nigeria) Ifedayo Olusegun	12	0	1	13
2	FW	50	(Brazil) Sandro	4	0	1	5
3	MF	88	(Malaysia) Brendan Gan	4	0	0	4
4	MF	7	(Malaysia) Sean Selvaraj	2	0	0	2
4	FW	10	(Spain) Rufino Segovia	2	0	0	2
6	MF	8	(Malaysia) Khyril Muhymeen	1	0	0	1
6	MF	21	(Singapore) Safuwan Baharudin	1	0	0	1
TOTALS				26	0	2	28
Own Goals Conceded
1	TBD	TBD	TBD	0	0	0	0
TOTALS				0	0	0	0

=== Top assists ===
Rnk	Pos	No.	Player	Super League	FA Cup	Malaysia Cup	Total
1	FW	50	(Brazil) Sandro	5	0	0	5
2	FW	12	(Nigeria) Ifedayo Olusegun	3	0	1	4
3	MF	7	(Malaysia) Sean Selvaraj	3	0	0	3
3	MF	22	(Malaysia) Syazwan Zainon	3	0	0	3
5	FW	10	(Spain) Rufino Segovia	2	0	1	2
6	DF	4	(Malaysia) Ashmawi Yakin	1	0	0	1
6	MF	11	(Malaysia) Wan Zack Haikal	0	0	1	1
6	MF	21	(Singapore) Safuwan Baharudin	1	0	0	1
6	DF	26	(Malaysia) A. Namathevan	1	0	0	1
6	MF	88	(Malaysia) Brendan Gan	1	0	0	1
TOTALS				20	0	2	22

=== Clean sheets ===
Rnk	No.	Player	Super League	FA Cup	Malaysia Cup	Total
1	1	(Malaysia) Khairulazhan	2	0	0	2
TOTALS			2	0	0	2

=== Disciplinary record ===
As of match played 8 November 2020

Rank	No.	Pos.	Name	Super League			FA Cup			Malaysia Cup			Total		
Rank	No.	Pos.	Name	Yellow card	(yellow card) (yellow-red card)	Red card	Yellow card	(yellow card) (yellow-red card)	Red card	Yellow card	(yellow card) (yellow-red card)	Red card	Yellow card	(yellow card) (yellow-red card)	Red card
1	3	DF	(Malaysia) Rodney Celvin	3	-	-	-	-	-	-	-	-	3	-	-
1	5	DF	(Australia) Taylor Regan	3	-	-	-	-	-	-	-	-	3	-	-
1	18	MF	(Malaysia) Halim Saari	3	-	-	-	-	-	-	-	-	3	-	-
1	21	MF	(Singapore) Safuwan Baharudin	3	-	-	-	-	-	-	-	-	3	-	-
5	4	DF	(Malaysia) Ashmawi Yakin	2	-	-	-	-	-	-	-	-	2	-	-
5	20	DF	(Malaysia) Syahmi Safari	2	-	-	-	-	-	-	-	-	2	-	-
5	22	MF	(Malaysia) Syazwan Zainon	2	-	-	-	-	-	-	-	-	2	-	-
8	1	GK	(Malaysia) Khairulazhan	-	-	-	-	-	-	1	-	-	1	-	-
8	6	MF	(Malaysia) K. Sarkunan	-	-	-	-	-	-	1	-	-	1	-	-
8	10	FW	(Spain) Rufino Segovia	1	-	-	-	-	-	-	-	-	1	-	-
8	19	DF	(Malaysia) K. Prabakaran	1	-	-	-	-	-	-	-	-	1	-	-
8	23	DF	(Malaysia) Nick Swirad	1	-	-	-	-	-	-	-	-	1	-	-
8	27	DF	(Malaysia) M. Tamil Maran	1	-	-	-	-	-	-	-	-	1	-	-
8	42	MF	(Malaysia) Aliff Haiqal	1	-	-	-	-	-	-	-	-	1	-	-
8	43	DF	(Malaysia) Zikri Khalili	-	-	-	-	-	-	1	-	-	1	-	-
8	50	FW	(Brazil) Sandro	1	-	-	-	-	-	-	-	-	1	-	-
8	88	MF	(Malaysia) Brendan Gan	-	1	-	-	-	-	-	-	-	-	1	-
Total				24	1	0	0	0	0	3	0	0	27	1	0
