= Tamilmaran Manimaran =

Malaysian footballer

M. Tamilmaran
Personal information
- Full name: Tamilmaran a/l Manimaran
- Date of birth: 16 September 1997 (age 29)
- Place of birth: Selangor, Malaysia
- Height: 1.76 m (5 ft 9 1/2 in)
- Position: Wing-back

Youth career
- 2011–2015: Selangor

Senior career*
Years	Team	Apps	(Gls)
2017–2020	Selangor	5	(0)
2021–2022	Petaling Jaya City	15	(1)
2023	Harini F.C.		
2024–2025	Bunga Raya Damansara		
- * Club domestic league appearances and goals

Tamilmaran a/l Manimaran (born 16 September 1997) is a Malaysian professional footballer who plays as a wing-back.

== Club career ==
=== Early year ===
Born in Klang Valley, Selangor, Tamil played as a youth for Selangor at the age of 16. He progressed through the youth system and was part of the team that finished as a champions of the President Cup in 2017.

=== Selangor ===
Tamil quickly progressed through the youth ranks and the reserve team at Selangor and impressed enough to earn a first team debut at the age of 20. He made his first senior appearance against Penang on 28 October 2017 in a Super League match, playing full 90-minutes. On 27 November 2017, Selangor under-21 manager Ariffin Ab Hamid confirmed that Tamil would be definitely promoted to Selangor's first team for 2018 season.

=== Petaling Jaya City ===
After spend three years with Selangor, Tamil change sides to join Petaling Jaya City for a find new challenge.

== Career statistics ==
=== Club ===
As of 12 September 2021

Club	Season	League			Cup^{1}		League Cup^{2}		Continental		Total	
Club	Season	Division	Apps	Goals	Apps	Goals	Apps	Goals	Apps	Goals	Apps	Goals
Selangor	2017	Malaysia Super League	1	0	0	0	0	0	—		1	0
Selangor	2018	Malaysia Super League	3	0	0	0	0	0	—		3	0
Selangor	2019	Malaysia Super League	0	0	0	0	0	0	—		0	0
Selangor	2020	Malaysia Super League	1	0	0	0	0	0	—		1	0
Selangor	Total		5	0	0	0	0	0	0	0	5	0
Petaling Jaya City	2021	Malaysia Super League	15	1	0	0	0	0	—		15	1
Petaling Jaya City	Total		15	1	0	0	0	0	0	0	15	1

^{1} Includes Malaysia FA Cup matches.
^{2} Includes Malaysia Cup matches.

== Honours ==
=== Club ===
Selangor

- President Cup (1): 2017
