= 2017 Piala Presiden =

2017 Piala Presiden may refer to either:

- 2017 Indonesia President's Cup
- 2017 Piala Presiden (Malaysia)
