= 2018 Selangor FA season =

2018 season of Malaysian association football club

Selangor FA
2018 season
- President: Subahan Kamal (until May 2018); Tengku Amir Shah (in office on 3 July)
- Manager: Abdul Rauf Ahmad
- Head coach: P. Maniam (until 14 March); Nazliazmi Mohd Nasir (interim-coach, from 14 March)
- Stadium: 1. Shah Alam Stadium; 2. KLFA Stadium (interim)
- Super League: 8th
- FA Cup: Runners-up
- Malaysia Cup: Group Stage (3rd)
- Top goalscorer: League: (19 goals); Rufino Segovia; All: (31 goals); Rufino Segovia
- Highest home attendance: 20,000; Super League; Selangor v Pahang (24 February 2018)
- Lowest home attendance: 480; Super League; Selangor v Kuala Lumpur (15 July 2018)
- Average home league attendance: 4,300
- Biggest win: Super League; 4–0 v Kelantan (H) (1 June 2018); FA Cup; 4–0 v PKNS (H) (23 June 2018)
- Biggest defeat: Super League; 0–4 v Kedah (A) (13 April 2018)
Home colours	Away colours	Third colours

The 2018 Selangor FA Season was Selangor FA's 13th season playing soccer in the Malaysia Super League since its inception in 2004.

Selangor FA began the season on 4 February 2018. They will also compete in two domestic cups, the Malaysia FA Cup and Malaysia Cup.

== Season Overview ==
=== Pre-season ===
(Squad build and first transfers)

On 16 November, Selangor squad manager, Abd Rauf Ahmad confirmed that P. Maniam will retain as Selangor's coach for 2018 season.

On 28 November, Ariffin Ab Hamid, manager of Selangor U21 squad confirmed that six players will be promoted to the first squad. Those players were Haziq Ridwan, Syukri Azman, Amirul Haziq, Tamil Maran, Azizul Baharuddin and Kugan Dhevarajan.

During the pre-season planning, P.Maniam also added a few new local players for the season, such as Sean Selvaraj (Negeri Sembilan), Azamuddin Akil (Johor Darul Ta'zim), Ashmawi Yakin (Negeri Sembilan), Joseph Kalang Tie (Pahang) and Shahrul Igwan (Negeri Sembilan).

A few Selangor key players for the last season left the club including Adam Nor Azlin who joins Johor Darul Ta'zim as the first signing for the club since 2017 season end. Other transfers are Bunyamin Umar and Liberian Forkey Doe to Pahang, Raimi Mohd Nor, Fitri Shazwan and Nigerian Ugo Ukah to Penang who plays in second division, Rizal Fahmi to Negeri Sembilan, Zarif Irfan to PKNS, S. Veenod to Kelantan and star player, Indonesian Andik Vermansyah to Kedah.

In early December, Selangor signs for three new foreign players; young Indonesian players, Evan Dimas and Ilham Armaiyn, and a Brazilian defender Willian Pacheco.

Selangor announces its fifth signing on 28 January, Alfonso Cruz, another Spanish footballer in addition Rufino Segovia, who is retained from last season.

=== Pre-season and Friendlies Match ===
Selangor first planned to go to Indonesia from 7 to 17 January for its pre-season campaign but it is cancelled for undisclosed reason.

On 30 December, Selangor began its pre-season with a match against ATM at Kementah Stadium, Kuala Lumpur. The game ends with 1–1 draw. The goal from Selangor is contributed by the Spanish footballer, Rufino Segovia.

In the next match against MISC-MIFA at USIM Mini Stadium in Negeri Sembilan, held on 5 January, Selangor suffers a big defeat with the final score 5–1 against Selangor. MISC-MIFA player, Kpah Sherman scores a hat-trick in the match while Selangor's goal is scored by its captain, Razman Roslan.

Selangor recorded its first win on 10 January during a match against Terengganu II at Sime Darby Football Complex at Bukit Jelutong with 1–0, with the single goal scored by Selangor veteran, Amri Yahyah.

Selangor final friendly match, against Korea Republic third-tier club Daejon Korail was scheduled on 26 January but due to bad weather, the match was postponed to the next morning. On the match played at National Sports Council pitch in Kuala Lumpur, Selangor won 3–1, with goals from Rufino Segovia, Tamil Maran and Faizzudin Abidin.

Overall, Selangor finishes the pre-season with 2 wins, 1 draw and 1 loss.

=== January ===
Although Selangor had signed Evan Dimas and Ilham Armaiyn as early as December, Football Association of Indonesia (PSSI) does not allow them to join the rest of the team for their pre-season. On 4 January, Selangor president, Subahan Kamal had flown to Jakarta to meet Edy Rahmayadi, PSSI president to find a solution and understanding between the two bodies. The negotiation is successful as Edy finally grants permission to the two Indonesian players to join Selangor's camp following Selangor agreement to comply to PSSI demand in return, which is to allow them to report to the Indonesia national under-23 football team camp when they are called.

On 16 January, Football Association of Malaysia (FAM) President, Tunku Ismail releases a statement on the body official Facebook page that denies Selangor's application to use Bukit Jalil National Stadium as their home venue, citing that certain matches will collide with Malaysia national football team's calendar as the stadium is also used by the national team as their homeground.

Following the rejection, Selangor approaches UiTM on 18 January in a bid to share their stadium but they were denied by the ground owner because of logistic and safety issues.

On 26 January, Selangor's vice-president, Abdul Rauf Ahmad confirmed that they had gained permission from Kuala Lumpur City Hall to use Kuala Lumpur Stadium as their venue and only waiting for official confirmation from FMLLP. On 30 January, it is reported that Kuala Lumpur president, Datuk Seri Adnan Md Ikhsan expressed his reluctance to share Kuala Lumpur stadium with Selangor this season because of the rivalries between the two teams. When he was asked to comment on his remarks, he told the reporters that he was joking and refused to comment on it further.

On 28 January, Selangor launches its kits for 2018 season. The launching ceremony was held at Plaza Alam Sentral, Shah Alam and was attended by hundreds of Red Giants fans.

=== February ===
Selangor officially kicks off its 2018 Malaysia Super League campaign on 4 February 2018 with a highly anticipated Klang Valley Derby match against Kuala Lumpur. Playing in their shared venue, Selangor played as away and claimed the title King of Klang Valley as they won the match 2–0, with both goals from Rufino Segovia.

On 7 February, Selangor won 4–1 against Melaka United, with two goals each from Rufino Segovia and Syahmi Safari. The two consecutive wins allow Selangor to be on top of the league for the first two weeks.

On 10 February, Selangor suffers its first lost at Sultan Ismail Nasiruddin Shah Stadium in a match against Terengganu. The final score is 1–4 to Terengganu as Selangor's only goal from Amri Yahyah came late at the 89th minute.

On 11 February, Selangor announces its collaboration with local musician, Monoloque, to produce a new anthem song for the football team in a pre-launch event.

After a week Chinese New Year break, Selangor comes back on 24 February only to lose against Pahang 1–3 on their own homeground. Selangor's goal was contributed once again by Rufino Segovia making him the team topscorer, as he had scored 5 goals for Selangor so far.

=== March ===
On 1 March, Football Association of Malaysia's referees committee chairman, Subkhiddin Mohd Salleh announced that two referees from Selangor's match against Pahang FA on 24 February will be suspended for two weeks following the controversial penalty given to Pahang's side. During the match, Selangor's defender Willian Pacheco commits a hand ball outside the penalty box but a penalty was awarded despite Selangor's objection.

Selangor starts its campaign in the FA Cup in the second round match against MOF on 4 March, following a first round bye. They won with 3–0, with a goal each from Amri Yahyah, Rufino Segovia and Syahmi Safari.

Following a statement released by Football Malaysia Limited Liability Partnership (FMLLP) on 19 February where Selangor was announced as one of the team failed to submit their registration document on time, on 7 March FMLLP announced that Selangor will have to pay RM 1.5 mil fine for the offense.

On 11 March, Selangor faces their third defeat in a row in the Super League, this time against rival Perak with 3–0 to Perak. This result had spark anger from the fans that pushes for coach P. Maniam to be fired. On 14 March, Selangor announces that Maniam had been rested and the assistant coach, Nazliazmi Mohd Nasir will takeover as a caretaker coach while Selangor finds a suitable candidate to replace the coach.

The next game was held on 14 March, against Terengganu. It was the first game played by Selangor after the changing in coaching staff. In the third round match of FA Cup, Selangor won 3–1. The goals was contributed by Amri Yahyah, Willian Pacheco and Evan Dimas.

=== May ===
On 31 May 2018, the departing president, Subahan Kamal confirmed that Tengku Amir Shah will replace him as the football association's president after he left the sports body.

=== July ===
Tengku Amir officially became the president of Selangor FA after receiving 81 nominations from 96 affiliates and won uncontested in the extraordinary congress that was held on 3 July 2018. He stated that his goal as the new president is to make FA Selangor self-sustaining and become a commercially viable club. He aimed for the club to be able to not rely on state funding in five years.

=== November ===
On 3 November 2018, a group of individuals called an Extraordinary Congress (EC) to elect new executive committee, citing that the appointment of several committee members are not lawful, including the position of several vice-presidents. The subsequent re-election showed total change in all posts, barring Tengku Amir who was re-elected as the president. However, Tengku Amir later declared that the EC was invalid since it does not followed the proper procedure. It was also held without his consent and was not recognised by him and the association. This was supported by the Football Association of Malaysia president, Hamidin Amin, who said that Tengku Amir is still the president of FAS and the congress was invalid as it was held without the president's consent. Tengku Amir called the rogue faction to meet him at the palace to voice out their displeasure but only less than half of them attended it. As a result, he removed 43 affiliate clubs from the association, stating that they no longer hold the same values and dreams as FA Selangor. The announcement was made through FAS social media accounts on 15 December 2018.

== Kit ==
Supplier: Lotto / Sponsor: redONE

Home	Away	Third	Goalkeeper

== Players ==
=== First Team Squad ===
No.	Name	Nationality	Position(s)	Since	Signed from
Goalkeepers
1	Khairulazhan Khalid	(Malaysia)	GK	2016	Pahang
21	Norazlan Razali	(Malaysia)	GK	2015	Johor Darul Ta'zim
22	Haziq Ridwan	(Malaysia)	GK	2017	Youth system
Defenders
2	A. Namathevan	(Malaysia)	RB / RWB	2016	Youth system
3	K. Kannan	(Malaysia)	LB / LWB / LW / RW	2016	Youth system
5	Amirul Ashraf	(Malaysia)	CB / LB	2016	Youth system
13	Razman Roslan (captain)	(Malaysia)	CB / RB	2016	Pahang
15	Ashmawi Yakin	(Malaysia)	RB / RWB	2017	Negeri Sembilan
23	Willian Pacheco	(Brazil)	CB	2017	(Indonesia) Persija Jakarta
26	Fairuz Abdul Aziz	(Malaysia)	LB / CB / RB	2017	AirAsia
27	M. Tamil Maran	(Malaysia)	CB / DM	2017	Youth system
Midfielders
4	Halim Zainal	(Malaysia)	CM / DM	2017	Kuala Lumpur
6	Evan Dimas	(Indonesia)	DM / CM	2017	(Indonesia) Bhayangkara
7	Sean Selvaraj	(Malaysia)	RW / LW / RM / LM	2017	Negeri Sembilan
8	Saiful Ridzuwan	(Malaysia)	DM / CM	2015	Harimau Muda A
11	Faizzudin Abidin	(Malaysia)	RW / LW / AM	2016	Youth system
14	Alfonso Cruz	(Spain)	DM / CM	2018	Free agent
16	K. Sarkunan	(Malaysia)	DM / CM	2016	Youth system
19	Joseph Kalang Tie	(Malaysia)	CM / RM / LM	2017	Pahang
20	Syahmi Safari	(Malaysia)	RW / LW / LM / RM	2016	Youth system
28	Shahrul Igwan	(Malaysia)	DM / CM / CAM	2017	Negeri Sembilan
30	D. Kugan	(Malaysia)	LW / LM	2017	Youth system
Forwards
10	Rufino Segovia	(Spain)	ST / LW / CAM	2017	(Hong Kong) Kitchee
12	Azamuddin Akil	(Malaysia)	LW / RW / ST	2017	Johor Darul Ta'zim
17	Amri Yahyah	(Malaysia)	CAM / LW / RW / ST	2017	Melaka United
18	Ilham Armaiyn	(Indonesia)	LW / RW / ST	2017	(Indonesia) Bhayangkara

=== Reserve Team Squad ===
No.	Name	Nationality	Position(s)	Since	Signed from
Youth System
24	Syukri Azman	(Malaysia)	LB / LWB	2017	Youth system
25	Amirul Haziq	(Malaysia)	CB	2017	Youth system
29	Azizul Baharuddin	(Malaysia)	ST	2017	Youth system
32	Badrul Amin	(Malaysia)	ST	2016	Youth system

== Transfers ==
=== First transfers ===
20 November 2017 – 11 February 2018

==== Transfers in ====
Date	No.	Pos.	Name	Age	Moving from	Type	Transfer fee	Team
20 November 2017	19	MF	(Malaysia) Joseph Kalang Tie	30	(Malaysia) Pahang	Contract expired	Free transfer	First team
27 November 2017	22	GK	(Malaysia) Haziq Ridwan	21	(Malaysia) Youth system	Promoted	N/A	First team
27 November 2017	24	CB	(Malaysia) Syukri Azman	20	(Malaysia) Youth system	Promoted	N/A	Reserve team
27 November 2017	25	CB	(Malaysia) Amirul Haziq	19	(Malaysia) Youth system	Promoted	N/A	Reserve team
27 November 2017	27	CB	(Malaysia) M. Tamil Maran	20	(Malaysia) Youth system	Promoted	N/A	First team
27 November 2017	29	FW	(Malaysia) Azizul Baharuddin	19	(Malaysia) Youth system	Promoted	N/A	Reserve team
27 November 2017	30	MF	(Malaysia) D. Kugan	20	(Malaysia) Youth system	Promoted	N/A	First team
30 November 2017	12	FW	(Malaysia) Azamuddin Akil	32	(Malaysia) Johor Darul Ta'zim	Contract expired	Free transfer	First team
1 December 2017	7	MF	(Malaysia) Sean Selvaraj	21	(Malaysia) Negeri Sembilan	Contract expired	Free transfer	First team
2 December 2017	6	MF	(Indonesia) Evan Dimas	22	(Indonesia) Bhayangkara	Contract expired	Free transfer	First team
2 December 2017	18	FW	(Indonesia) Ilham Armaiyn	21	(Indonesia) Bhayangkara	Contract expired	Free transfer	First team
4 December 2017	15	DF	(Malaysia) Ashmawi Yakin	23	(Malaysia) Negeri Sembilan	Contract expired	Free transfer	First team
4 December 2017	23	CB	(Brazil) Willian Pacheco	25	(Indonesia) Persija Jakarta	Contract expired	Free transfer	First team
4 December 2017	28	MF	(Malaysia) Shahrul Igwan	23	(Malaysia) Negeri Sembilan	Contract expired	Free transfer	First team
28 January 2018	14	MF	(Spain) Alfonso Cruz	31	Free agent	N/A	Free transfer	First team

==== Transfers out ====
Date	No.	Pos.	Name	Age	Moving to	Type	Transfer fee	Team
5 November 2017	27	FW	(Malaysia) Nurshamil Ghani	23	(Malaysia) Melaka United	Loan return	—	First team
10 November 2017	12	DF	(Malaysia) Bunyamin Umar	29	(Malaysia) Pahang	Contract expired	Free transfer	First team
10 November 2017	15	DF	(Malaysia) Raimi Nor	31	(Malaysia) Penang	Contract expired	Free transfer	First team
10 November 2017	17	DF	(Malaysia) Rizal Fahmi	31	(Malaysia) Negeri Sembilan	Contract expired	Free transfer	First team
10 November 2017	18	DF	(Nigeria) Ugo Ukah	33	(Malaysia) Penang	Contract expired	Free transfer	First team
10 November 2017	19	FW	(Malaysia) Afiq Azmi	28	Free agent	Contract expired	Free transfer	First team
18 November 2017	9	DF	(Malaysia) Adam Nor Azlin	21	(Malaysia) Johor Darul Ta'zim	Contract expired	Free transfer	First team
22 November 2017	23	MF	(Malaysia) S. Veenod	29	(Malaysia) Kelantan	Contract expired	Free transfer	First team
22 November 2017	24	MF	(Malaysia) Fitri Shazwan	29	(Malaysia) Penang	Contract expired	Free transfer	First team
2 December 2017	22	GK	(Malaysia) Zarif Irfan	22	(Malaysia) PKNS	Contract expired	Free transfer	First team
3 December 2017	5	MF	(Malaysia) K. Satish	23	Free agent	Contract expired	Free transfer	First team
9 February 2018	7	MF	(Indonesia) Andik Vermansyah	26	(Malaysia) Kedah	Contract expired	Free transfer	First team
9 February 2018	10	FW	(Liberia) Forkey Doe	32	(Malaysia) Pahang	Contract expired	Free transfer	First team

== Pre-season and friendlies ==
30 December 2017 Friendly	Selangor (Malaysia)	1–1	(Malaysia) ATM	Kuala Lumpur
16:45 UTC+08:00	Rufino 3'			Stadium: Kementah Stadium

5 January 2018 Friendly	MISC-MIFA (Malaysia)	5–1	(Malaysia) Selangor	Nilai, Negeri Sembilan
16:45 UTC+08:00	Sherman 2' (pen.), 19', 35'; Danasehar 25'; Mugentirran 90+2'	Report	Razman 90+4' (pen.)	Stadium: USIM Mini Stadium

10 January 2018 Friendly	Terengganu II (Malaysia)	0–1	(Malaysia) Selangor	Bukit Jelutong, Selangor
21:00 UTC+08:00			Amri (pen.)	Stadium: Padang SDFC

27 January 2018 Friendly	Daejeon Korail (South Korea)	1–3	(Malaysia) Selangor	Bukit Jalil, Kuala Lumpur
9:30 UTC+08:00			Rufino (pen.); Tamil Maran; Faizzudin	Stadium: Padang MSN, KL Sport City

== Competitions ==
=== Overview ===
Competition	First match	Last match	Starting round	Final position	Record							
Competition	First match	Last match	Starting round	Final position	Pld	W	D	L	GF	GA	GD	Win %
Malaysia Super League	4 February 2018	29 July 2018	Matchday 1	8th	22	7	6	9	35	39	−4	31.82
Malaysia FA Cup	4 March 2018	7 July 2018	Second round	Runners-up	7	4	1	2	14	7	+7	57.14
Malaysia Cup	4 August 2018	16 September 2018	Group stage	Group stage	6	2	0	4	9	11	−2	33.33
Total					35	13	7	15	58	57	+1	37.14

Last updated: 16 September 2018
Source: Competitions

=== Malaysia Super League ===
==== Table ====
Pos	Team	Pld	W	D	L	GF	GA	GD	Pts
6	Kedah	22	9	5	8	37	36	+1	32
7	Melaka United	22	9	4	9	33	38	−5	31
8	Selangor	22	7	6	9	35	39	−4	27
9	PKNP	22	7	4	11	25	31	−6	25
10	Kuala Lumpur	22	7	3	12	39	51	−12	24

Source: FAM, FMLLP
Rules for classification: 1) Points; 2) Goal difference; 3) Number of goals scored.

==== Results summary ====
Overall								Home						Away					
Pld	W	D	L	GF	GA	GD	Pts	W	D	L	GF	GA	GD	W	D	L	GF	GA	GD
22	7	6	9	35	39	−4	27	5	4	2	23	15	+8	2	2	7	12	24	−12

Source: Super League fixtures and results

==== Results by matchday ====
Win Draw Loss

Round	1	2	3	4	5	6	7	8	9	10	11	12	13	14	15	16	17	18	19	20	21	22
Ground	A	H	A	H	A	A	H	A	H	H	H	H	H	A	H	A	A	H	A	A	A	H
Result	W	W	L	L	L	L	W	L	D	D	L	W	W	D	D	D	L	D	L	L	W	W
Position	1	1	3	5	8	10	8	10	9	8	9	9	8	8	8	7	8	9	9	10	8	8

Source: Super League fixtures and results
A = Away; H = Home; W = Win; D = Draw; L = Loss

==== Matches ====
The league fixtures were announced on 11 January 2018.

Win Draw Loss

4 February 2018 1	Kuala Lumpur	0–2	Selangor	Cheras, Kuala Lumpur
21:00 UTC+08:00	Hisyamudin (yellow card) 74'; Azmeer (yellow card) 77'	Report (1); Report (2)	Rufino 16', 90+2'; Razman (yellow card) 35'	Stadium: KLFA Stadium; Attendance: 11,406; Referee: Suhaizi Shukri

7 February 2018 2	Selangor	4–1	Melaka United	Cheras, Kuala Lumpur
21:00 UTC+08:00	Rufino 8', 67'; Amri (yellow card) 32'; Kugan (yellow card) 45+2'; Syahmi 54', 90'	Report (1); Report (2)	Tiago 30'	Stadium: KLFA Stadium; Attendance: 7,868; Referee: Nagor Amir Noor Mohamed

10 February 2018 3	Terengganu	4–1	Selangor	Kuala Terengganu, Terengganu
21:00 UTC+08:00	Tuck 33', 68'; Shahrul 60'; Tchétché 66'; Nasrullah (yellow card) 81'	Report (1); Report (2)	Evan (yellow card) 49'; Razman (yellow card) 84'; Amri 89'	Stadium: Sultan Ismail Nasiruddin Shah Stadium; Attendance: 1,000; Referee: Fitri Maskon

24 February 2018 4	Selangor	1–3	Pahang	Cheras, Kuala Lumpur
16:45 UTC+08:00	Rufino 38' (pen.) (yellow card) 63'; Pacheco (yellow card) 69'; Razman (yellow card) 77'	Report (1); Report (2)	Cruz 7'; Sumareh (yellow card) 26'; Safuwan (yellow card) 45+2'; Forkey Doe 49', 71' (pen.)	Stadium: KLFA Stadium; Attendance: 20,000; Referee: Nafeez Abd Wahab

11 March 2018 5	Perak	3–0	Selangor	Lumut, Perak
21:00 UTC+08:00	Ashmawi 21' (o.g.); Pallraj 35'; Gilmar 45' (yellow card) 45'; Nazrin (yellow card) 76'	Report (1); Report (2}	Joseph (yellow card) 11'; Pacheco (yellow card) 74' (yellow-red card) 85'	Stadium: Naval Base Stadium; Attendance: 6,532; Referee: Suhaimi Mat Hassan

13 April 2018 6	Kedah	4–0	Selangor	Alor Setar, Kedah
21:00 UTC+08:00	Syazwan 4'; Sandro 45', 65'; Rizal (yellow card) 55'; Akram (yellow card) 31' (goal) 83'; Akhyar (yellow card) 89'	Report (1); Report (2)	Kannan (yellow card) 20'	Stadium: Darulaman Stadium; Attendance: 8,257; Referee: Nazmi Nasaruddin

28 April 2018 7	Selangor	2–1	Negeri Sembilan	Cheras, Kuala Lumpur
16:45 UTC+08:00	Pacheco (yellow card) 9'; Rufino 35'; Kugan (yellow card) 42'; Sean 56'; Sarkunan (yellow card) 80'	Report (1); Report (2)	Thanabalan 64'	Stadium: KLFA Stadium; Attendance: 1960; Referee: Nagor Amir Noor Mohamed

2 May 2018 8	Johor Darul Ta'zim	2–0	Selangor	Johor Bahru, Johor
21:00 UTC+08:00	Insa (yellow card) 45+2'; Hazwan 61'; Nazmi 69'; Safawi (yellow card) 82'	Report (1); Report (2)	Namathevan (yellow card) 31'; Sean (yellow card) 90+2'	Stadium: Tan Sri Dato' Haji Hassan Yunos Stadium, Larkin; Attendance: 10,220; Referee: Suhaimi Mat Hassan

6 May 2018 9	Selangor	1–1	PKNP	Cheras, Kuala Lumpur
16:45 UTC+08:00	Saiful (yellow card) 33'; Rufino 54'	Report (1); Report (2)	Norhakim (yellow card) 87'; Hafiz 90+6'	Stadium: KLFA Stadium; Attendance: 1,015; Referee: Fitri Maskon

12 May 2018 10	Selangor	2–2	Johor Darul Ta'zim	Cheras, Kuala Lumpur
16:45 UTC+08:00	Saiful 14'; Rufino 16'; Pacheco (yellow card) 57'	Report (1); Report (2)	Cabrera 3'; Kunanlan (yellow card) 32'; Novillo 68'	Stadium: KLFA Stadium; Attendance: 7,831; Referee: Suhaizi Shukri

26 May 2018 11	Selangor	1–2	Kedah	Cheras, Kuala Lumpur
22:00 UTC+08:00	Syahmi 70'; Evan (yellow card) 71'; Amri (yellow card) 79'	Report (1); Report (2)	Baddrol 28'; Liridon 52'; Akram (yellow card) 78'	Stadium: KLFA Stadium; Attendance: 3,400; Referee: Fitri Maskon

1 June 2018 12	Selangor	4–0	Kelantan	Cheras, Kuala Lumpur
22:00 UTC+08:00	Rufino 31', 36', 82'; Evan 38'; Saiful (yellow card) 89'	Report (1); Report (2)	Fakhrul (yellow card) 86'	Stadium: KLFA Stadium; Attendance: 1,682; Referee: Nafeez Abd Wahab

6 June 2018 13	Selangor	2–1	PKNS	Cheras, Kuala Lumpur
22:00 UTC+08:00	Rufino 7'; Saiful (yellow card) 9'; Evan 60'; Kannan (yellow card) 60'	Report (1); Report (2)	Safee 43' (yellow card) 73'	Stadium: KLFA Stadium; Attendance: 853; Referee: Fitri Maskon

10 June 2018 14	PKNS	2–2	Selangor	Shah Alam, Selangor
22:00 UTC+08:00	Ramazotti 18', 90+2'; Bruno (yellow card) 90+5'	Report (1); Report (2)	Halim (yellow card) 40'; Rufino 80'; Kugan 89'	Stadium: Shah Alam Stadium; Attendance: 1,568; Referee: Suhaimi Mat Hassan

19 June 2018 15	Selangor	1–1	Perak	Cheras, Kuala Lumpur
21:00 UTC+08:00	Kugan (yellow card) 4'; Saiful (yellow card) 67'; Pacheco (yellow card) 72'; Amri 82'	Report (1); Report (2)	Cruz 43' (o.g.); Khairil (yellow card) 61'; Shahrul (yellow card) 84'	Stadium: KLFA Stadium; Attendance: 1,281; Referee: Nazmi Nasaruddin

26 June 2018 16	Pahang	1–1	Selangor	Kuantan, Pahang
21:00 UTC+08:00	Davies (yellow card) 36'; Bunyamin (yellow card) 45+3'; Azam (yellow card) 45+4'; Zaharulnizam 50'	Report (1); Report (2)	Cruz (yellow card) 29'; Rufino 62'; Pacheco (yellow card) 82'	Stadium: Darul Makmur Stadium; Attendance: 2,155; Referee: Nagor Amir Noor Mohamed

11 July 2018 17	Kelantan	2–1	Selangor	Kota Bharu, Kelantan
21:00 UTC+08:00	Shafiq 35'; Cássio (yellow card) 77'; Ashraf 86'; Fakhrul (yellow card) 88'	Report (1); Report (2)	Halim (yellow card) 71'; Sean 78'	Stadium: Sultan Muhammad IV Stadium; Attendance: 385; Referee: Fitri Maskon

15 July 2018 18	Selangor	3–3	Kuala Lumpur	Cheras, Kuala Lumpur
21:00 UTC+08:00	Rufino 13', 36' (pen.), 62'	Report (1); Report (2)	Zhafri 6'; Hafiz 20'; Saifulnizam (yellow card) 37'; Josué 47'; Indra (red card) 64'; Akbarov (yellow card) 81'	Stadium: KLFA Stadium; Attendance: 480; Referee: Nazmi Nasaruddin

18 July 2018 19	Negeri Sembilan	3–1	Selangor	Seremban, Negeri Sembilan
21:00 UTC+08:00	Vélez 12', 74'; Flávio 18' (pen.); Faizal (yellow card) 36'; Aizulridzwan (yellow card) 47'	Report (1); Report (2)	Rufino 14'; Saiful (yellow card) 24'; Razman (yellow card) 58'	Stadium: Tuanku Abdul Rahman Stadium; Attendance: 631; Referee: Zamzaidi Katimin

21 July 2018 20	Melaka United	3–2	Selangor	Krubong, Malacca
21:00 UTC+08:00	Zubovich 50', 84'; Gopinathan (yellow card) 74'; Swirad 90+4'	Report (1); Report (2)	Ilham 26'; Ashmawi (yellow card) 35'; Kugan 70'; Cruz (yellow card) 75'	Stadium: Hang Jebat Stadium; Attendance: 1,773; Referee: Nagor Amir Noor Mohamed

26 July 2018 21	PKNP	0–2	Selangor	Ipoh, Perak
21:00 UTC+08:00	Fadhil (yellow card) 34'	Report (1); Report (2)	Syahmi 39'; Saiful (yellow card) 48'; Amri 82'; Namathevan (yellow card) 90+3'	Stadium: Perak Stadium; Attendance: 1,894; Referee: Zamzaidi Katimin

29 July 2018 22	Selangor	2–0	Terengganu	Cheras, Kuala Lumpur
21:00 UTC+08:00	Syahmi 72'; Rufino 90'	Report (1); Report (2)	Zonjić (yellow card) 90+2'	Stadium: KLFA Stadium; Attendance: 927; Referee: Suhaizi Shukri

==== Results overview ====
Win Draw Loss

Team	Home score	Away score	Double
Johor Darul Ta'zim	2–2	0–2	2–4
Kedah	1–2	0–4	1–6
Kelantan	4–0	1–2	5–2
Kuala Lumpur	3–3	2–0	5–3
Melaka United	4–1	2–3	6–4
Negeri Sembilan	2–1	1–3	3–4
Pahang	1–3	1–1	2–4
Perak	1–1	0–3	1–4
PKNP	1–1	2–0	3–1
PKNS	2–1	2–2	4–3
Terengganu	2–0	1–4	3–4

=== FA Cup ===
4 March 2018 Second round	MOF	0–3	Selangor	Cheras, Kuala Lumpur
21:00 UTC+08:00	Daniel Ong (red card) 81'	Report	Amri 70'; Rufino 82' (pen.); Syahmi 90+3'	Stadium: KLFA Stadium; Attendance: TBD; Referee: Mat Zan Abd Wahab

16 March 2018 Third round	Terengganu	1–3	Selangor	Kuala Terengganu, Terengganu
21:00 UTC+08:00	Shahrul 24'; Thierry (yellow card) 60'; Fitri (yellow card) 70'	Report	Amri (yellow card) 7'; Rufino 27', 70' (pen.); Evan 62'; Pacheco (yellow card) 83'; Halim (yellow card) 90'	Stadium: Sultan Ismail Nasiruddin Shah Stadium; Attendance: TBD; Referee: Nagor Amir Noor Mohamed

==== Quarter-finals ====
7 April 2018 First leg	Kuala Lumpur	0–3	Selangor	Cheras, Kuala Lumpur
21:00 UTC+08:00	de Paula (red card) 26'; Firdaus (yellow card) 53'	Report	Amri (yellow card) 12'; Pacheco 20' (yellow card) 58'; Rufino 24', 90+1'; Halim (yellow card) 27'	Stadium: KLFA Stadium; Attendance: TBD; Referee: Suhaizi Shukri

21 April 2018 Second leg	Selangor	0–3 (3–3 agg.) (8–7 p)	Kuala Lumpur	Cheras, Kuala Lumpur
21:00 UTC+08:00	Ashraf (yellow card) 63'; Sean (yellow card) 89'	Report	Zaquan 15' (yellow card) 104'; Josué 45+2'; Syazwan Andik 54'; Anuar (yellow card) 90+2'	Stadium: KLFA Stadium; Attendance: TBD; Referee: Nafeez Abd Wahab
	Penalties
	Rufino (penalty scored); Evan (penalty scored); Sean (penalty scored); Azamuddin (penalty scored); Ilham (penalty missed); Namathevan (penalty scored); Kannan (penalty scored); Sarkunan (penalty scored); Ashraf (penalty scored)		Josué (penalty scored); Indra (penalty missed); Zhafri (penalty scored); Irfan (penalty scored); Hafiz (penalty scored); Syazwan Andik (penalty scored); Akbarov (penalty scored); Zaquan (penalty scored); Firdaus (penalty missed)

==== Semi-finals ====
23 June 2018 First leg	Selangor	4–0	PKNS	Cheras, Kuala Lumpur
21:00 UTC+08:00	Saiful (yellow card) 29'; Rufino 39', 41', 56'; Azmizi 64' (o.g.); Razman (yellow card) 88'	Report	Rodney (yellow card) 15'; Shahrul (yellow card) 72'	Stadium: KLFA Stadium; Attendance: TBD; Referee: Suhaimi Mat Hassan

30 June 2018 Second leg	PKNS	1–1 (1–5 agg.)	Selangor	Shah Alam, Selangor
21:00 UTC+08:00	Sivakumar (yellow card) 20'; Shahrul (yellow card) 23'; Rodney (yellow card) 48'; Jafri (yellow card) 61'; Safee (yellow card) 64'; Alif 90'	Report	Cruz (yellow card) 3'; Rufino 71'	Stadium: Shah Alam Stadium; Attendance: TBD; Referee: Nazmi Nasaruddin

==== Final ====
7 July 2018 Final	Selangor	0–2	Pahang	Kuala Lumpur
21:00 UTC+08:00	Amri (yellow card) 28'; Cruz (yellow card) 61'; Razman (yellow card) 75'	Report	Azam 23' (yellow card) 80'; Cruz 63' (pen.)	Stadium: Bukit Jalil National Stadium; Attendance: TBD; Referee: Zulkarnain Zakaria

=== Malaysia Cup ===
Selangor joined the competition in the group stage.

==== Group stage ====
Pos	Team	Pld	W	D	L	GF	GA	GD	Pts	Qualification	SAB	PAH	SEL	PKNP
1	Sabah	6	4	1	1	8	7	+1	13	Advance to knockout stage	—	0–4	2–1	1–0
2	Pahang	6	3	2	1	9	4	+5	11	Advance to knockout stage	1–1	—	1–3	0–0
3	Selangor	6	2	0	4	9	11	−2	6		1–2	0–2	—	0–3
4	PKNP	6	1	1	4	4	8	−4	4		0–2	0–1	1–4	—

Updated to match(es) played on 17 September 2018. Source: FAM FMLLP

4 August 2018 1	Selangor	0–3	PKNP	Shah Alam, Selangor
21:00 UTC+8	Saiful (yellow card) 73'	Report (1); Report (2)	Hafiz 23'; Fandi 32'; Azraei (yellow card) 35' (yellow-red card) 78'; Safar (yellow card) 45'; Krjauklis 62' (yellow card) 69'	Stadium: Shah Alam Stadium; Attendance: 1,160; Referee: Zamzaidi Katimin

11 August 2018 2	Selangor	0–2	Pahang	Shah Alam, Selangor
21:00 UTC+8	Saiful (yellow card) 10'; Razman (yellow card) 35'	Report (1); Report (2)	Muslim 31' (yellow card) 50'; Safuwan (yellow card) 37'; Norshahrul 55' (yellow card) 88'; Amutu (yellow card) 69'	Stadium: Shah Alam Stadium; Attendance: 2,848; Referee: Nazmi Nasaruddin

18 August 2018 3	Sabah	2–1	Selangor	Kota Kinabalu, Sabah
20:15 UTC+8	Rawilson (yellow card) 55'; Rahman 82'; Ricco 90+2'	Report (1); Report (2)	Amri (yellow card) 64'; Sean 79'	Stadium: Likas Stadium; Attendance: 6,200; Referee: Zulkarnain Zakaria

28 August 2018 4	Selangor	1–2	Sabah	Shah Alam, Selangor
21:00 UTC+8	Amri (yellow card) 23'; Sean (yellow card) 44'; Syahmi (yellow card) 62'; Rufino 90+4' (pen.)	Report (1); Report (2)	Hamran (yellow card) 37'; Ramos 52'; Randy (yellow card) 65'; Paunović 86'	Stadium: Shah Alam Stadium; Attendance: 951; Referee: Nagor Amir Noor Mohamed

1 September 2018 5	Pahang	1–3	Selangor	Kuantan, Pahang
21:00 UTC+8	Safuwan 31' (yellow card) 57'; Amutu (yellow card) 43'	Report (1); Report (2)	Rufino 7'; Ashraf (yellow card) 10'; Ashmawi (red card) 28'; Pacheco 48'; Saiful (yellow card) 68'; Sarkunan 90+4' (yellow card) 90+5'	Stadium: Darul Makmur Stadium; Attendance: 3,484; Referee: Fitri Maskon

16 September 2018 6	PKNP	1–4	Selangor	Ipoh, Perak
21:00 UTC+8	Fandi 29'; Khuzaimi (yellow card) 54'	Report (1); Report (2)	Evan 37'; Rufino 39' (pen.); Amri 42'; Razman (yellow card) 52'; Joseph 90+2'	Stadium: Perak Stadium; Attendance: 428; Referee: Hasrol Amir

== Statistics ==
=== Squad statistics ===
As of 16 September 2018

Appearances (Apps.) numbers are for appearances in competitive games only including sub appearances.
\ Red card numbers denote: Numbers in parentheses represent red cards overturned for wrongful dismissal.

No.	Nat.	Player	Pos.	Super League				FA Cup				Malaysia Cup				Total			
No.	Nat.	Player	Pos.	Apps	Goal	Yellow card	Red card	Apps	Goal	Yellow card	Red card	Apps	Goal	Yellow card	Red card	Apps	Goal	Yellow card	Red card
1	(Malaysia)	Khairulazhan	GK	14				5				3				22			
2	(Malaysia)	A. Namathevan	DF	13		2		4				2				19		2	
3	(Malaysia)	K. Kannan	DF	21		2		6				6				33		2	
4	(Malaysia)	Halim Zainal	MF	10		2		5		2		1				16		4	
5	(Malaysia)	Amirul Ashraf	DF	8				4		1		4		1		16		2	
6	(Indonesia)	Evan Dimas	MF	20	2	2		5	1			3	1			28	4	2	
7	(Malaysia)	Sean Selvaraj	MF	13	2	1		1		1		6	1	1		20	3	3	
8	(Malaysia)	Saiful Ridzuwan	MF	17	1	6		6		1		5		3		28	1	10	
10	(Spain)	Rufino Segovia	FW	22	19	1		7	9			6	3			35	31	1	
11	(Malaysia)	Faizzudin Abidin	MF	7								3				10			
12	(Malaysia)	Azamuddin Akil	FW	6				3								9			
13	(Malaysia)	Razman Roslan	DF	8		4		6		2		4		2		18		8	
14	(Spain)	Alfonso Cruz	MF	18		2		4		2		3				25		4	
15	(Malaysia)	Ashmawi Yakin	DF	7		1		3				2			1	12		1	1
16	(Malaysia)	K. Sarkunan	MF	5		1		1				4	1	1		10	1	2	
17	(Malaysia)	Amri Yahyah	FW	22	3	2		6	1	3		5	1	2		33	5	7	
18	(Indonesia)	Ilham Armaiyn	FW	16	1			7				3				26	1		
19	(Malaysia)	Joseph Kalang Tie	MF	9		1		3				2	1			14	1	1	
20	(Malaysia)	Syahmi Safari	MF	13	5			5	1			3		1		21	6	1	
21	(Malaysia)	Norazlan Razali	GK	7				2				2				11			
22	(Malaysia)	Haziq Ridwan	GK	3								1				4			
23	(Brazil)	Willian Pacheco	DF	14		5	1	5	1	2		6	1			25	2	7	1
24	(Malaysia)	Syukri Azman	DF	3								1				4			
25	(Malaysia)	Amirul Haziq	DF	2												2			
26	(Malaysia)	Fairuz Abdul Aziz	DF	3				1								4			
27	(Malaysia)	M. Tamil Maran	DF	3												3			
28	(Malaysia)	Shahrul Igwan	MF	6				2				4				12			
29	(Malaysia)	Azizul Baharuddin	FW	2				1								3			
30	(Malaysia)	Kugan Dhevarajan	MF	12	2	3		6								18	2	3	
32	(Malaysia)	Badrul Amin	FW									1				1			
Own goals					0				1				0				1		
Totals					35	35	1		14	14	0		9	11	1		58	60	2

=== Goalscorers ===
Includes all competitive matches.

As of match played 16 September 2018

Rank	Pos.	No.	Player	Super League	FA Cup	Malaysia Cup	Total
1	FW	10	(Spain) Rufino Segovia	19	9	3	31
2	MF	20	(Malaysia) Syahmi Safari	5	1	0	6
3	FW	17	(Malaysia) Amri Yahyah	3	1	1	5
4	MF	6	(Indonesia) Evan Dimas	2	1	1	4
5	MF	7	(Malaysia) Sean Selvaraj	2	0	1	3
6	DF	23	(Brazil) Willian Pacheco	0	1	1	2
6	MF	30	(Malaysia) D. Kugan	2	0	0	2
8	MF	8	(Malaysia) Saiful Ridzuwan	1	0	0	1
8	MF	16	(Malaysia) K. Sarkunan	0	0	1	1
8	MF	18	(Indonesia) Ilham Armaiyn	1	0	0	1
8	MF	19	(Malaysia) Joseph Kalang Tie	0	0	1	1
Own Goals				0	1	0	1
TOTALS				35	14	9	58
Own Goals Conceded
1	MF	14	(Spain) Alfonso Cruz	1	0	0	1
TOTALS				1	0	0	1

=== Clean sheets ===
Rnk	No.	Player	Super League	FA Cup	Malaysia Cup	Total
1	1	(Malaysia) Khairulazhan	1	2	0	3
2	21	(Malaysia) Norazlan Razali	1	1	0	2
2	22	(Malaysia) Haziq Ridwan	2	0	0	2
TOTALS			4	3	0	7

=== Disciplinary record ===
As of match played 16 September 2018

Rank	No.	Pos.	Name	Super League			FA Cup			Malaysia Cup			Total		
Rank	No.	Pos.	Name	Yellow card	(yellow card) (yellow-red card)	Red card	Yellow card	(yellow card) (yellow-red card)	Red card	Yellow card	(yellow card) (yellow-red card)	Red card	Yellow card	(yellow card) (yellow-red card)	Red card
1	8	MF	(Malaysia) Saiful Ridzuwan	6	-	-	1	-	-	3	-	-	10	-	-
2	13	DF	(Malaysia) Razman Roslan	4	-	-	2	-	-	2	-	-	8	-	-
3	17	FW	(Malaysia) Amri Yahyah	2	-	-	3	-	-	2	-	-	7	-	-
3	23	DF	(Brazil) Willian Pacheco	5	1	-	2	-	-	-	-	-	7	1	-
5	4	MF	(Malaysia) Halim Zainal	2	-	-	2	-	-	-	-	-	4	-	-
5	14	MF	(Spain) Alfonso Cruz	2	-	-	2	-	-	-	-	-	4	-	-
7	7	MF	(Malaysia) Sean Selvaraj	1	-	-	1	-	-	1	-	-	3	-	-
7	30	DF	(Malaysia) D. Kugan	3	-	-	-	-	-	-	-	-	3	-	-
9	2	DF	(Malaysia) A. Namathevan	2	-	-	-	-	-	-	-	-	2	-	-
9	3	DF	(Malaysia) K. Kannan	2	-	-	-	-	-	-	-	-	2	-	-
9	5	MF	(Malaysia) Amirul Ashraf	-	-	-	1	-	-	1	-	-	2	-	-
9	6	MF	(Indonesia) Evan Dimas	2	-	-	-	-	-	-	-	-	2	-	-
9	16	MF	(Malaysia) K. Sarkunan	1	-	-	-	-	-	1	-	-	2	-	-
14	10	FW	(Spain) Rufino Segovia	1	-	-	-	-	-	-	-	-	1	-	-
14	15	DF	(Malaysia) Ashmawi Yakin	1	-	-	-	-	-	-	-	1	1	-	1
14	19	MF	(Malaysia) Joseph Kalang Tie	1	-	-	-	-	-	-	-	-	1	-	-
14	20	MF	(Malaysia) Syahmi Safari	-	-	-	-	-	-	1	-	-	1	-	-
Total				35	1	0	14	0	0	11	0	1	60	1	1
