= Sean Selvaraj =

Malaysian footballer

Personal information
- Full name: Sean Eugene Selvaraj
- Date of birth: 11 April 1996 (age 30)
- Place of birth: Port Dickson, Negeri Sembilan, Malaysia
- Height: 1.81 m (5 ft 11 1/2 in)
- Positions: Winger; midfielder

Team information
- Current team: Kelantan The Real Warriors
- Number: 70

Youth career
- 2013–2016: Negeri Sembilan
- 2014: Harimau Muda C

Senior career*
Years	Team	Apps	(Gls)
2016–2017	Negeri Sembilan	9	(2)
2018–2021	Selangor	49	(7)
2022–2023	Negeri Sembilan	24	(2)
2024–2025	Sri Pahang	13	(0)
2025–	Kelantan The Real Warriors	4	(0)

International career^{‡}
2013–2015	Malaysia U-19	8	(1)
2016–2019	Malaysia U-23	7	(0)
- * Club domestic league appearances and goals as of 16:20, 20 September 2025 (UTC) ‡ National team caps and goals as of 18 December 2017

Sean Eugene Selvaraj (born 11 April 1996) is a Malaysian footballer who plays for Malaysia Super League club Kelantan The Real Warriors.

== Club career ==
=== Early year ===
Born in Negeri Sembilan, Sean played for Negeri Sembilan under-21 from 2013 to 2015. He also was one of the players representing the Negeri Sembilan football in sporting events (Sukma) in Sarawak.

=== Negeri Sembilan ===
In April 2016, Negeri Sembilan head coach, Gary Phillips confirmed that Sean would be definitely promoted to Negeri Sembilan's first team. He just made 9 appearances and scored two goals in Malaysia Premier League on two seasons (2016, 2017).

=== Selangor ===
On 4 December 2017, Sean signed a one-year contract with Malaysia Super League club Selangor on a free transfer.

=== Negeri Sembilan ===
In 2022 he returned to join the team Negeri Sembilan FC on a free transfer after spent two years with the team in 2016 and 2017. Since 2022 he has been with the team for one years and has become an important player throughout 2022. He has helped the team secure fourth place in the Malaysia Super League in 2022. It is an impressive achievement as the team has just been promoted from the Malaysia Premier League in the previous year and had shocked the other Malaysia Super League teams because Negeri Sembilan FC was considered an underdog team. He has made 12 appearances and score 2 goals during his time with Negeri Sembilan FC since 2022 and made a total of 21 appearances and score 4 goals overall for Negeri Sembilan since 2016.

== International career ==
On 1 July 2017, Sean was called up to the Malaysia U-23 for 2018 AFC U-23 Championship qualification in 2017. Sean made his full debut on AFC qualification matches against Indonesia U-23 on 19 July 2017, playing 30 minutes in Bangkok, Thailand. The match ended with a 3–0 win for Malaysia.

== Career statistics ==
=== Club ===
As of 20 September 2025

Appearances and goals by club, season and competition
Club	Season	League			Cup		League Cup		Continental^{1}		Total	
Club	Season	Division	Apps	Goals	Apps	Goals	Apps	Goals	Apps	Goals	Apps	Goals
Negeri Sembilan	2016	Malaysia Premier League	3	1	0	0	0	0	–		0	1
Negeri Sembilan	2017	Malaysia Premier League	4	1	1	0	4	0	–		9	1
Negeri Sembilan	Total		9	2	0	0	0	0	0	0	0	2
Selangor	2018	Malaysia Super League	13	2	1	0	6	1	–		20	3
Selangor	2019	Malaysia Super League	18	2	2	0	7	0	–		27	2
Selangor	2020	Malaysia Super League	6	2	–		1	0	–		7	2
Selangor	2021	Malaysia Super League	12	1	0	0	5	1	–		17	2
Selangor	Total		49	7	3	0	19	2	–		71	9
Negeri Sembilan	2022	Malaysia Super League	12	2	1	0	0	0	–		13	2
Negeri Sembilan	2023	Malaysia Super League	12	0	0	0	3	1	–		15	1
Negeri Sembilan	Total		24	2	1	0	3	1	0	0	28	3
Sri Pahang	2024–25	Malaysia Super League	13	0	0	0	7	1	–		20	1
Sri Pahang	Total		13	0	0	0	7	1	0	0	20	1
Kelantan The Real Warriors	2025–26	Malaysia Super League	4	0	2	1	0	0	–		6	1
Kelantan The Real Warriors	Total		4	0	2	1	0	0	0	0	6	1
Career Total			0	0	0	0	0	0	0	0	0	0

^{1} Includes AFC Cup and AFC Champions League.

== Honours ==
=== Club ===
Selangor

- Malaysia FA Cup runner-up: 2018
