= K. Sarkunan =

Malaysian footballer

Personal information
- Full name: Sarkunan a/l Krishnansamy
- Date of birth: 4 August 1996 (age 30)
- Place of birth: Kajang, Malaysia
- Height: 1.70 m (5 ft 7 in)
- Position: Central midfielder

Youth career
- 2016: Selangor U21

Senior career*
Years	Team	Apps	(Gls)
2017–2022	Selangor	32	(0)
2022	→ Negeri Sembilan (loan)	0	(0)
- * Club domestic league appearances and goals as of January 05, 2023

Sarkunan a/l Krishnansamy (born 4 August 1996) is a Malaysian professional footballer who plays as a central midfielder.

== Club career ==
=== Selangor ===
Sarkunan started his career playing for Selangor youth team before being promoted into first team in December 2016. Sarkunan made his debut for the club in a 3–1 win over Penang coming off from the bench on 28 October 2017. On 1 September 2018, he scored his first professional goal against Pahang away with eventual 3–1 win in Malaysia Cup.

==== Negeri Sembilan (loan) ====
On 15 December 2021, Sarkunan joined Negeri Sembilan on a season-long loan.

== Career statistics ==
=== Club ===
As of match played 30 November 2022

Appearances and goals by club, season and competition
Club	Season	League			Cup		League Cup		Continental^{1}		Total	
Club	Season	Division	Apps	Goals	Apps	Goals	Apps	Goals	Apps	Goals	Apps	Goals
Selangor	2017	Malaysia Super League	1	0	0	0	0	0	–		1	0
Selangor	2018	Malaysia Super League	5	0	1	0	4	1	–		10	1
Selangor	2019	Malaysia Super League	14	0	2	0	9	0	–		25	0
Selangor	2020	Malaysia Super League	5	0	–		1	0	–		6	0
Selangor	2021	Malaysia Super League	7	0	–		3	0	–		10	0
Selangor	Total		32	0	3	0	17	1	0	0	52	1
Negeri Sembilan (loan)	2022	Malaysia Super League	0	0	0	0	0	0	—		0	0
Career Total			32	0	3	0	17	1	0	0	52	1

^{1} Includes AFC Cup and AFC Champions League.
