= Ashmawi Yakin =

Malaysian footballer (born 1994)

Personal information
- Full name: Mohamad Ashmawi bin Md. Yakin
- Date of birth: 1 January 1994 (age 32)
- Place of birth: Seremban, Negeri Sembilan, Malaysia
- Height: 1.73 m (5 ft 8 in)
- Position: Right-back

Team information
- Current team: Immigration
- Number: 77

Youth career
- 2008–2011: Bukit Jalil Sports School

Senior career*
Years	Team	Apps	(Gls)
2012–2014	Harimau Muda B	49	(0)
2015	Harimau Muda	14	(0)
2016–2017	Negeri Sembilan	5	(0)
2018–2022	Selangor	32	(1)
2023–	Immigration	0	(0)

International career^{‡}
2008–2010	Malaysia U-16	33	(0)
2011–2013	Malaysia U-19	18	(0)
2014–2017	Malaysia U-23	3	(0)
- * Club domestic league appearances and goals as of 8 December 2022 ‡ National team caps and goals as of 18 December 2017

Mohamad Ashmawi bin Md. Yakin (born 1 January 1994) is a Malaysian footballer who plays for Malaysia M3 League club Immigration as a defender.

== Club career ==
=== Early year ===
Born in Seremban, Negeri Sembilan, Ashmawi began his football career playing for Bukit Jalil Sports School team in 2011 at the age of 17, before been discovered by Ong Kim Swee to play in Harimau Muda B at the age 19.

=== Negeri Sembilan ===
After Harimau Muda team been dissolved in 2015, Ashmawi signed two-years contract with his hometown side Negeri Sembilan.

=== Selangor ===
On 4 December 2017, Ashmawi signed a one-year contract with Malaysia Super League club Selangor on a free transfer.

== Career statistics ==
=== Club ===
As of 30 November 2022

Appearances and goals by club, season and competition.
Club performance			League		Cup		League Cup		Continental		Total	
Season	Club	League	Apps	Goals	Apps	Goals	Apps	Goals	Apps	Goals	Apps	Goals
2012	Harimau Muda B	Malaysia Premier League	3	0	0	0	0	0	–		3	0
Total			3	0	0	0	0	0	0	0	3	0
2013	Harimau Muda B	S.League	23	0	1	0	5	0	–		29	0
2014	Harimau Muda B	S.League	23	0	0	0	0	0	–		23	0
Total			46	0	1	0	5	0	0	0	52	0
2015	Harimau Muda A	S.League	14	0	0	0	0	0	–		14	0
Total			14	0	0	0	0	0	0	0	14	0
2016	Negeri Sembilan	Malaysia Premier League	4	0	1	0	0	0	–		5	0
2017	Negeri Sembilan	Malaysia Premier League	1	0	0	0	2	0	–		3	0
Total			5	0	1	0	2	0	0	0	8	0
2018	Selangor	Malaysia Super League	7	0	3	0	2	0	–		12	0
2019	Selangor	Malaysia Super League	4	0	0	0	1	0	–		5	0
2020	Selangor	Malaysia Super League	5	0	0	0	0	0	–		5	0
2021	Selangor	Malaysia Super League	12	0	0	0	6	1	–		18	1
2022	Selangor	Malaysia Super League	4	0	1	0	0	0	–		5	0
Total			32	0	4	0	9	1	0	0	42	1
Career total			100	0	6	0	16	1	0	0	119	1

== International career ==
Ashmawi was called up to the Malaysia U-16 for 2010 AFC U-16 Championship qualification in 2009.

== Honours ==
=== Club ===
- TO BE DETERMINED

=== International ===
- TO BE DETERMINED
