= Rufino Segovia =

Spanish footballer (born 1985)

Rufino
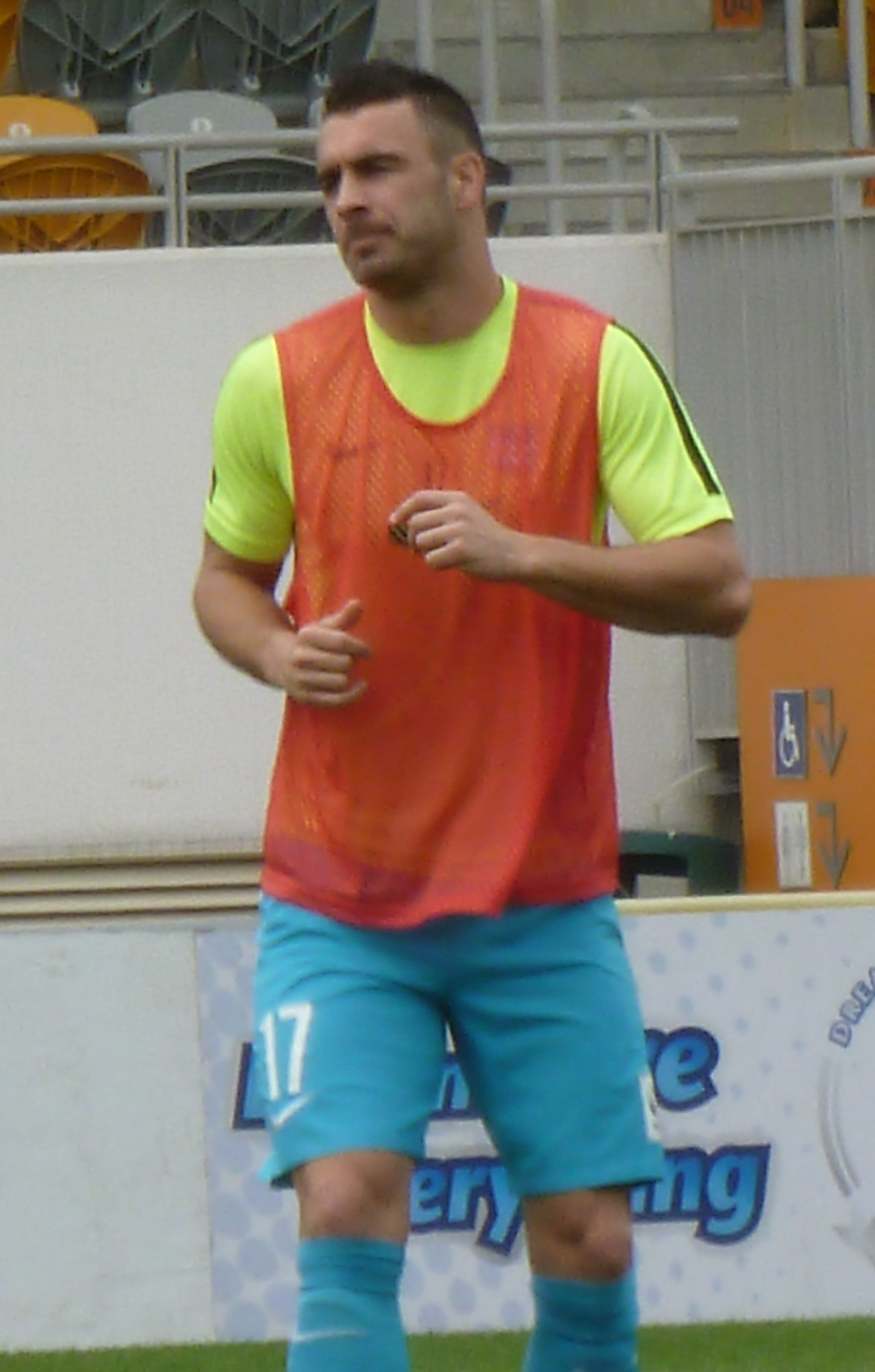
- Rufino training with Kitchee

Personal information
- Full name: Rufino Segovia del Burgo
- Date of birth: 1 March 1985 (age 41)
- Place of birth: Madrid, Spain
- Height: 1.76 m (5 ft 9 1/2 in)
- Position: Forward

Youth career
- Rayo Vallecano

Senior career*
Years	Team	Apps	(Gls)
2004–2005	Rayo Vallecano B	?	(17)
2005	Rayo Vallecano	5	(1)
2005–2007	Atlético Madrid B	66	(7)
2006–2007	Atlético Madrid	2	(0)
2007–2008	Valladolid B	35	(11)
2008	Águilas	19	(8)
2009	Melilla	14	(3)
2009–2010	Toledo	35	(10)
2010–2011	Honvéd	14	(2)
2011	Burgos	18	(2)
2012	Huracán	14	(2)
2012–2015	Toledo	86	(45)
2015–2016	Poli Timișoara	14	(2)
2016–2017	Kitchee	25	(13)
2017–2020	Selangor	45	(29)
2021–2022	Marbella	27	(9)
Total		419+	(161)
- * Club domestic league appearances and goals

Rufino Segovia del Burgo (born 1 March 1985), known simply as Rufino, is a Spanish former professional footballer who played as a forward.

== Club career ==
Born in Madrid, Rufino made his professional debut with hometown's Rayo Vallecano, first appearing with the first team in the 2004–05 season as they competed in the Segunda División B. He then moved to neighbours Atlético Madrid, where he would spend the vast majority of his spell with the reserves.

Rufino's La Liga output would consist of two matches: on 22 April 2006, he replaced fellow youth graduate Manu del Moral for the final 20 minutes of a 1–0 win at Deportivo Alavés. Almost one year later, he played roughly the same amount of time in a 0–0 home draw against Real Betis.

Released in summer 2007, Rufino took his game to division three, consecutively with Real Valladolid Promesas, Águilas CF, UD Melilla and CD Toledo. In July 2011, after one year in Hungary, he returned to his country and signed for Burgos CF of the same tier.

Rufino spent the vast majority of the following seasons in the third division, also helping the club he represented mostly in this timeframe, CD Toledo, promote from the fourth in 2013. In 2015 he returned to top-flight football, sharing teams with four compatriots at ACS Poli Timișoara in the Romanian Liga I.

While playing for Selangor F.C. in the Malaysia Super League, Rufino was crowned top scorer of the 2018 season with 19 goals, adding the Best Foreign Player award. Just five matches into the following campaign, he injured his Achilles tendon and was sidelined for nine months; during this period, he also lost his father (named Rufino as well).

Rufino returned to Spain on 24 September 2021, with the 36-year-old signing with Tercera División RFEF club Marbella FC.

== Career statistics ==
As of match played on 10 October 2020

Appearances and goals by club, season and competition
Club	Season	League			Cup		Other		Total	
Club	Season	Division	Apps	Goals	Apps	Goals	Apps	Goals	Apps	Goals
Rayo Vallecano	2004–05	Segunda División B	5	1	0	0	—		5	1
Atlético Madrid B	2005–06	Segunda División B	30	5	—		—		30	5
Atlético Madrid B	2006–07	Segunda División B	36	2	—		—		36	2
Atlético Madrid B	Total		71	8	—		—		71	8
Atlético Madrid	2005–06	La Liga	1	0	0	0	—		1	0
Atlético Madrid	2006–07	La Liga	1	0	0	0	—		1	0
Atlético Madrid	Total		2	0	0	0	—		2	0
Valladolid B	2007–08	Segunda División B	35	11	—		—		35	11
Águilas	2008–09	Segunda División B	19	8	1	0	—		20	8
Melilla	2008–09	Segunda División B	14	3	0	0	—		14	3
Toledo	2009–10	Segunda División B	33	9	1	0	2 (Note: Appearances in relegation play-offs)	1	36	10
Honvéd	2010–11	Nemzeti Bajnokság I	14	2	5	5	—		19	7
Burgos	2011–12	Segunda División B	18	2	1	0	—		19	2
Huracán	2011–12	Segunda División B	14	2	0	0	2 (Note: Appearances in promotion play-offs)	0	16	2
Toledo	2013–14	Segunda División B	35	14	1	0	2	1	38	15
Toledo	2014–15	Segunda División B	32	18	1	0	—		33	18
Toledo	Total		214	69	10	5	6	2	230	76
Poli Timișoara	2015–16	Liga I	16	2	3	0	—		19	2
Kitchee	2015–16	HK Premier League	6	4	4	6	7 (Note: Appearances in AFC Cup)	6	17	16
Kitchee	2016–17	HK Premier League	19	9	6	2	0	0	25	11
Kitchee	Total		41	15	13	8	7	6	61	29
Selangor	2017	Malaysia Super League	6	5	0	0	6 (Note: Appearances in Malaysia Cup)	5	12	10
Selangor	2018	Malaysia Super League	22	19	7	9	6	3	35	31
Selangor	2019	Malaysia Super League	6	3	0	0	0	0	6	3
Selangor	2020	Malaysia Super League	11	2	0	0	1	0	12	2
Selangor	Total		45	29	7	9	13	8	65	46
Career total			373	121	30	22	26	16	429	159
