= Kugan Dhevarajan =

Malaysian footballer

D. Kugan
Personal information
- Full name: Kugan a/l Dhevarajan
- Date of birth: 11 January 1997 (age 29)
- Place of birth: Selangor, Malaysia
- Height: 1.70 m (5 ft 7 in)
- Position: Midfielder

Youth career
- 2011–2015: Selangor

Senior career*
Years	Team	Apps	(Gls)
2018–2019	Selangor	17	(2)
2020–2023	Petaling Jaya City	18	(1)
2024–2025	Bunga Raya Damansara		
- * Club domestic league appearances and goals

Kugan a/l Dhevarajan (born 11 January 1997) is a Malaysian professional footballer who plays as a midfielder.

== Club career ==
=== Early years ===
Born in Selangor, Kugan joined Selangor's youth system as a 16-year-old, and continued climbing through the ranks until reaching Selangor under-21 squad in 2015.

=== Selangor ===
Kugan made his way through the youth and reserve teams and was a key member of Omar Ali's Under-21 team. In addition to winning his first President Cup medal with Selangor under-21 on 2017, he also finished the season with 23 appearances and scoring four goals.

== Career statistics ==
=== Club ===
As of 30 June 2018

Club	Season	League			Cup^{1}		League Cup^{2}		Continental		Total	
Club	Season	Division	Apps	Goals	Apps	Goals	Apps	Goals	Apps	Goals	Apps	Goals
Selangor	2018	Malaysia Super League	10	1	5	0	0	0	—		15	1
Selangor	Total		10	1	5	0	0	0	0	0	15	1

^{1} Includes Malaysia FA Cup matches.
^{2} Includes Malaysia Cup matches.

== Honours ==
=== Club ===
Selangor

- President Cup (1): 2017
