= Ilham Armaiyn =

Indonesian footballer (born 1996)

Personal information
- Full name: Ilham Udin Armaiyn
- Date of birth: 10 May 1996 (age 30)
- Place of birth: Lelei, Indonesia
- Height: 1.65 m (5 ft 5 in)
- Position: Winger

Team information
- Current team: Persiraja Banda Aceh
- Number: 20

Youth career
- 2012: SSB Tunas Gamalama
- 2013–2015: Diklat Ragunan

Senior career*
Years	Team	Apps	(Gls)
2015–2017	Bhayangkara	58	(13)
2018	Selangor	16	(1)
2018–2019	Bhayangkara	14	(0)
2020–2021	Barito Putera	3	(0)
2021–2022	PSM Makassar	28	(3)
2022–2023	Arema	27	(3)
2023–2025	Malut United	20	(3)
2025–2026	PSBS Biak	14	(0)
2026–	Persiraja Banda Aceh	1	(0)

International career
2013–2014	Indonesia U19	28	(9)
2015–2018	Indonesia U23	13	(0)
2017–2018	Indonesia	4	(1)
Medal record
Men's football
Representing Indonesia
AFF U-19 Youth Championship
Winner	2013 Indonesia
- * Club domestic league appearances and goals as of 13 September 2026

Ilham Udin Armaiyn (born 10 May 1996) is an Indonesian professional footballer who plays as a winger for Championship club Persiraja Banda Aceh.

== Club career ==
=== Persebaya ISL (Bhayangkara) ===
On 21 October 2014, Ilham signed a four-year contract with Persebaya ISL (Bhayangkara) to commence ahead of the 2015 Indonesia Super League. He made his debut on 5 April 2015, replacing Rudi Widodo in the 57th minute of a 1–0 victory against Mitra Kukar at Gelora Bung Tomo Stadium.

In the 2017 season, Ilham helped them win the 2017 Liga 1 title, the first trophy of his career.

=== Selangor FA ===
On 2 December 2017, Ilham signed a one-year contract with Malaysia Super League club Selangor on a free transfer, along with his national teammates Evan Dimas. He made his first-team debut for Selangor after starting the 2018 Malaysia Super League match against Kuala Lumpur F.A. on 4 February 2018, in which Selangor won 0–2. But, in the 66th minute, Ilham was tackled from behind by one of the opposition's players. He was then unable to continue the match and eventually replaced in the 71st minute.

On 27 July 2018, Ilham scored his first league goal in the 2018 Malaysia Super League for Selangor in a 3–2 loss over Melaka United at the Hang Jebat Stadium.

=== Return to Bhayangkara ===
In 2019, it was confirmed that Armaiyn would re-join Liga 1 club Bhayangkara, signing a year contract. He made his league debut on 16 May 2019 by starting in a 1–1 draw against Borneo at the Segiri Stadium, Samarinda. On 21 June, he give assists an opening goal by Flávio Beck Júnior in Bhayangkara's 1–1 away draw over PSS Sleman. During the 2019 season, he only made 14 league appearances and without scoring.

=== Barito Putera ===
He was signed for Barito Putera to play in the Liga 1 in the 2020 season.

He made his debut on 29 February 2020, replacing Ambrizal Umanailo in the 80th minute of a 4–0 lost against Madura United at Gelora Ratu Pamelingan Stadium. A month later, this season was suspended on 27 March 2020 due to the COVID-19 pandemic. The season was abandoned and was declared void on 20 January 2021.

=== PSM Makassar ===
On 4 June 2021, Ilham signed for Indonesian Liga 1 club, PSM Makassar. He made his league debut on 5 September by starting in a 1–1 draw against Arema at the Pakansari Stadium, and he also scored his first goal for PSM in the 21st minute. a week later, Ilham scored the opening goal in a 1–1 draw against Madura United. On 23 September, Ilham scored the winning goal in a 2–3 win over Persik Kediri. On 22 October, Ilham give assists an opening goal by Yakob Sayuri in PSM's 2–1 lose over Borneo at Manahan Stadium.

On 28 January 2022, Ilham give another assists an opening goal by Yakob Sayuri in PSM's 2–1 win over PS Barito Putera at Kompyang Sujana Stadium. Ilham had his best performance in the 2021–22 season where he scored 3 goals and 28 league appearances.

=== Arema ===
He was signed for Arema and announced to join the squad on 11 April 2022 with his partner from PSM, Hasyim Kipuw. He also brought Arema back to win the Indonesia President's Cup for the third time. He made his league debut in a 0–3 lost against Borneo Samarinda on 24 July 2022 as a substitute in the 46th minute. Six days later, he scored his first league goal for the club on a 2–1 win over PSIS Semarang, coming on as a substitute, Ilham sparked the momentum of Arema's victory. scored in the 79th minute in a chaotic situation after a corner. On 24 August, Ilham scored the opening goal in a 4–2 win against RANS Nusantara.

On 18 February 2023, coming on as a substitute of second half, Ilham sparked another the momentum of Arema's victory, scoring the winning goal in a 1–0 win against PS Barito Putera.

=== Malut United ===
Ilham signed for Liga 2 club, Maluku Utara United for the 2023–24 season.

== Career statistics ==
=== Club ===
As of 13 September 2026

Club	Season	League			Cup (Note: Includes Piala Indonesia, Malaysia FA Cup)		League Cup (Note: Appearances in Malaysia Cup)		Continental		Total	
Club	Season	Division	Apps	Goals	Apps	Goals	Apps	Goals	Apps	Goals	Apps	Goals
Persebaya ISL (Bhayangkara)	2015	Indonesia Super League	2	0	0	0	0	0	—		2	0
Bhayangkara	2016	ISC A	26	4	0	0	0	0	—		26	4
Bhayangkara	2017	Liga 1	30	9	0	0	0	0	—		30	9
Bhayangkara	Total		56	13	0	0	0	0	—		56	13
Selangor	2018	Malaysia Super League	16	1	7	0	0	0	—		23	1
Bhayangkara	2019	Liga 1	14	0	1	0	0	0	—		15	1
Barito Putera	2020	Liga 1	3	0	0	0	0	0	—		3	0
PSM Makassar	2021–22	Liga 1	28	3	0	0	0	0	—		28	3
Arema	2022–23	Liga 1	27	3	0	0	0	0	—		27	3
Maluku Utara United	2023–24	Liga 2	20	3	0	0	0	0	—		20	3
Maluku Utara United	2024–25	Liga 1	0	0	0	0	0	0	—		0	0
PSBS Biak	2025–26	Super League	14	0	0	0	0	0	—		14	0
Persiraja Banda Aceh	2026–27	Championship	1	0	0	0	0	0	—		1	0
Career total			181	23	8	0	0	0	—		189	23

=== International ===
As of match played 11 September 2018

Appearances and goals by national team and year
National team	Year	Apps	Goals
Indonesia	2017	2	0
Indonesia	2018	2	1
Total		4	1

=== International goals ===
Scores and results list Indonesia's goal tally first.

International goals by date, venue, opponent, score, result and competition
No.	Date	Venue	Opponent	Score	Result	Competition
1	14 January 2018	Gelora Bung Karno Stadium, Jakarta, Indonesia	Iceland	1–0	1–4	Friendly

== Honours ==
Bhayangkara

- Liga 1: 2017

Arema

- Piala Presiden: 2022

Malut United

- Liga 2 third place (play-offs): 2023–24

Indonesia U-19

- AFF U-19 Youth Championship: 2013

Indonesia

- Aceh World Solidarity Cup runner-up: 2017
