= Namathevan Arunasalam =

Malaysian footballer

A. Namathevan
Personal information
- Full name: Namathevan a/l Arunasalam
- Date of birth: 26 July 1996 (age 30)
- Place of birth: Selangor, Malaysia
- Height: 1.74 m (5 ft 9 in)
- Position: Right-back

Team information
- Current team: Immigration FC II
- Number: 80

Youth career
- 2015–2016: Selangor U-21

Senior career*
| Years | Team | Apps | (Gls) |
| 2016–2021 | Selangor | 60 | (0) |
| 2022 | Negeri Sembilan | 15 | (0) |
| 2023–2025 | Penang | 32 | (0) |
| 2025–2026 | Kedah FA | | |
- * Club domestic league appearances and goals

Namathevan a/l Arunasalam (born 26 July 1996) is a Malaysian professional footballer who plays as a right-back.

== Club career ==
=== Selangor ===
Namathevan began his football career with Selangor youth team before being promoted to first team in 2016. On 22 October 2016, Namathevan made his league debut for Selangor in a 1–2 defeat to Johor Darul Ta'zim at Shah Alam Stadium.

== Career statistics ==
=== Club ===
As of 5 September 2022

Appearances and goals by club, season and competition
| Club | Season | League | | | Cup | | League Cup | | Continental^{1} | | Total | |
| Club | Season | Division | Apps | Goals | Apps | Goals | Apps | Goals | Apps | Goals | Apps | Goals |
|---|---|---|---|---|---|---|---|---|---|---|---|---|
| Selangor | 2016 | Malaysia Super League | 1 | 0 | 0 | 0 | 1 | 0 | 0 | 0 | 2 | 0 |
| Selangor | 2017 | Malaysia Super League | 8 | 0 | 0 | 0 | 6 | 0 | – | | 14 | 0 |
| Selangor | 2018 | Malaysia Super League | 13 | 0 | 4 | 0 | 2 | 0 | – | | 19 | 0 |
| Selangor | 2019 | Malaysia Super League | 7 | 0 | 0 | 0 | 2 | 0 | – | | 9 | 0 |
| Selangor | 2020 | Malaysia Super League | 5 | 0 | 0 | 0 | 0 | 0 | – | | 5 | 0 |
| Selangor | 2021 | Malaysia Super League | 16 | 0 | 0 | 0 | 7 | 0 | – | | 23 | 0 |
| Selangor | Total | | 60 | 0 | 4 | 0 | 18 | 0 | 0 | 0 | 82 | 0 |
| Negeri Sembilan | 2022 | Malaysia Super League | 15 | 0 | 2 | 0 | 1 | 0 | – | | 18 | 0 |
| Negeri Sembilan | Total | | 15 | 0 | 2 | 0 | 1 | 0 | – | | 18 | 0 |
| Career Total | | | 0 | 0 | 0 | 0 | 0 | 0 | 0 | 0 | 0 | 0 |

^{1} Includes AFC Cup and AFC Champions League.
