= Saiful Ridzuwan =

Malaysian footballer

Saiful Ridzuan
Personal information
- Full name: Saiful Ridzuan bin Selamat
- Date of birth: 16 March 1992 (age 34)
- Place of birth: Kuala Lumpur, Malaysia
- Height: 1.68 m (5 ft 6 in)
- Position: Midfielder

Team information
- Current team: AAK
- Number: 24

Youth career
- 2012: UiTM FC

Senior career*
Years	Team	Apps	(Gls)
2013–2014	Harimau Muda A	23	(0)
2015–2018	Selangor	45	(1)
2018–2020	Melaka United	29	(0)
2021–2023	Negeri Sembilan	40	(0)
2024–2025	Gombak		
2025–	AAK Puncak Alam		

International career
2013–2015	Malaysia U-23	10	(2)
2016	Malaysia		
- * Club domestic league appearances and goals

Saiful Ridzuan bin Selamat (born 16 March 1992 in Kuala Lumpur) is a Malaysian professional footballer who plays as a midfielder for Malaysia A2 Amateur League club AAK Puncak Alam.

== Club career ==
=== Selangor FA ===
Saiful made his name with Harimau Muda A however briefly played for a year with UiTM FC. In the same year he also represented Selangor for the football event during the Sukma Games in Pahang. Playing as a midfielder, he signed with Selangor in 2015 after being released by Harimau Muda A.

=== Melaka United ===
On 1 December 2018, Saiful switched sides and joined Melaka United for a free transfer after his contract with Selangor become expires.

=== Negeri Sembilan FC ===
In 2021 he joined Negeri Sembilan FC on a free transfer. He has helped the team secure fourth place in the Malaysia Super League in 2022.

== Career statistics ==
=== Club ===
As of 30 June 2018

Appearances and goals by club, season and competition
Club	Season	League			Cup		League Cup		Continental^{1}		Total	
Club	Season	Division	Apps	Goals	Apps	Goals	Apps	Goals	Apps	Goals	Apps	Goals
Harimau Muda A	2014	Football Queensland	23	0	0	0	0	0	–		23	0
Harimau Muda A	Total		23	0	0	0	0	0	0	0	23	0
Selangor	2015	Malaysia Super League	0	0	0	0	2	0	–		2	0
Selangor	2016	Malaysia Super League	12	0	1	0	8	0	5	0	26	0
Selangor	2017	Malaysia Super League	20	0	1	0	8	0	–		29	0
Selangor	2018	Malaysia Super League	13	1	5	0	0	0	–		18	1
Selangor	Total		45	1	7	0	18	0	5	0	75	1

^{1} Includes AFC Cup and AFC Champions League.

== Honours ==
=== Club ===
Selangor

- Malaysia Cup: 2015
