= Kannan Kalaiselvan =

Malaysian footballer

K. Kannan
Personal information
- Full name: Kannan a/l Kalaiselvan
- Date of birth: 4 October 1996 (age 30)
- Place of birth: Selangor, Malaysia
- Height: 1.73 m (5 ft 8 in)
- Position: Left-back

Youth career
- 2014: Harimau Muda C
- 2015: Selangor U21

Senior career*
Years	Team	Apps	(Gls)
2016–2019	Selangor	36	(0)
2019	→ PKNS (loan)	6	(0)
2020–2023	Petaling Jaya City	26	(0)
2024–2025	Bunga Raya Damansara		

International career
2017–2019	Malaysia U22	5	(0)
2019	Malaysia	1	(0)
- * Club domestic league appearances and goals

Kannan a/l Kalaiselvan (born 26 July 1996) is a Malaysian professional footballer who plays as a left-back.

== Club career ==
=== Selangor ===
Kannan started his career at Selangor youth team before being promoted into first team in 2016. Kannan made his league debut for Selangor in a 1–1 draw against Sarawak on 24 August 2016.

== Career statistics ==
=== Club ===
As of 30 June 2018

Club	Season	League			Cup		League Cup		Continental^{1}		Total	
Club	Season	Division	Apps	Goals	Apps	Goals	Apps	Goals	Apps	Goals	Apps	Goals
Selangor	2016	Malaysia Super League	1	0	0	0	1	0	0	0	2	0
Selangor	2017	Malaysia Super League	14	0	1	0	5	0	–		20	0
Selangor	2018	Malaysia Super League	21	0	6	0	6	0	–		33	0
Selangor	Total		36	0	7	0	12	0	0	0	55	0
PKNS (loan)	2019	Malaysia Super League	6	0	1	0	0	0	0	0	7	0
PKNS (loan)	Total		6	0	1	0	0	0	0	0	7	0
Petaling Jaya City	2020	Malaysia Super League	8	0	–						8	0
Petaling Jaya City	2021	Malaysia Super League	18	0	–		0	0	–		18	0

^{1} Includes AFC Cup and AFC Champions League.
