= 2017 Piala Presiden (Malaysia) =

Football league in Malaysia

Final positions
- Champions: Selangor U21

Tournament statistics
- Matches played: 194
- Goals scored: 458 (2.36 per match)
- All statistics correct as of 21 October 2017.

The 2017 Piala Presiden (English: President Cup) is the 33rd season of the Piala Presiden, the youth level (Under-21) football league of Malaysia. The competition organized by the Football Association of Malaysia (FAM).

== Rule changes ==
The Piala Presiden is the amateur football competition in Malaysia for under-21 players. Since its inception in 1985, Piala Presiden has been the major tournament for under-21 and under-23 players. In 2009, the format of the competition was changed with only under-20 players eligible to be fielded for the tournament. In 2015 the format of the competition reverted to the original format with under-21 players.

== Teams ==
Team	Based
Kuala Lumpur	Bangi
Penang	Batu Kawan
(Malacca) Melaka	Paya Rumput
Pahang	Kuantan
Kedah	Alor Setar
(Selangor) PKNS	Kelana Jaya
PDRM	Kuala Lumpur
ATM	Kuala Lumpur
(Kuala Lumpur) Felda United	Nilai
(Terengganu) T-Team	Kuala Terengganu
Johor Darul Ta'zim III	Pasir Gudang
Negeri Sembilan	Paroi
Selangor	Salak Tinggi
Terengganu	Kuala Terengganu
Sarawak	Kuching
Kelantan	Kota Bharu
Perak	Ipoh
Sabah	Penampang
(Selangor) UiTM	Shah Alam
(Perak) PKNP	Chemor

The following teams will be participate in the 2017 Piala Presiden. In order by the number given by FAM.

== Team summaries ==
=== Personnel and kits ===
Note: Flags indicate national team as has been defined under FIFA eligibility rules. Players and Managers may hold more than one non-FIFA nationality.

Team	Coach	Captain	Kit	Shirt Sponsor
ATM U21	(Malaysia) Ahmad Hakim Yahya	(Malaysia) Ashraf Rashidi		
Johor Darul Ta'zim III	(Croatia) Ervin Boban	(Malaysia) Muhd Fahmi Faizal	Nike	Forest City
Kedah U21	(Malaysia) Victor Andrag	(Malaysia) Mohd Norfiqrie Ab. Talib	Al-Ikhsan	Bina Darulaman Berhad
Kelantan U21	(Malaysia) Mohd Hashim Mustapha	(Malaysia) Ahmad Syihan Hazmi Mohamed	HORC	None
Felda United U21	(Malaysia) Ahmad Shahrul Azhar Sofian	(Malaysia)	FBT	FELDA
Kuala Lumpur U21	(Malaysia) Khalid Shahdan	(Malaysia) Khatul Anuar Md Jalil		
Melaka United U21	(Malaysia) Hamdan Mohamad	(Malaysia) Kamil Ismail	Kronos	Edra, CGN, Tag Marine
Negeri Sembilan U21	(Malaysia) Sazali Saidun	(Malaysia) Faris Ariffin		
Pahang U21	(Malaysia) Fuzzemi Ibrahim	(Malaysia) Shahrul Nizam	Jako	Aras Kuasa
PDRM U21	(Malaysia) Mohd Ishak Kunju	(Malaysia) Syahmi Shakir Salim		
Perak U21	(Malaysia) Sayuddin Mohd Isa	(Malaysia) Izzat Mohd Ramlee		
Penang U21	(Malaysia) Manzoor Azwira Abdul Wahid	(Malaysia) Khairul Akmal Rokisham		
PKNP U21	(Malaysia) A. Pugelenthi	(Malaysia)		
Sabah U21	(Malaysia) Justin Ganai	(Malaysia)		
Sarawak U21	(Malaysia) S. Veloo	(Malaysia) Norazizi Ramlee	Starsport	Sarawak Energy
Selangor U21	(Malaysia) Omar Ali	(Malaysia) Muhammad Haziq Ridwan	Lotto	Selangor
PKNS U21	(Malaysia) Ridzuan Abu Shah	(Malaysia)	Kappa	PKNS
Terengganu U21	(Malaysia) Mustaffa Kamal Abdul Wahab	(Malaysia) Mohamad Fazikhikwan	Kobert	Chicken Cottage
T-Team U21	(Malaysia) Tengku Hazman Raja Hassan	(Malaysia) Mohd Amirul Hafizul Syamsul	Kobert	Chicken Cottage
UiTM U21	(Malaysia) Anuar Abu Bakar	(Malaysia) Muhammad Adib Rosli	Umbro	Soaring Upwards

== League table ==
=== Group A ===
Pos	Team	Pld	W	D	L	GF	GA	GD	Pts	Qualification or relegation
1	Kedah U21	18	10	4	4	27	16	+11	34	Qualification for Knockout Stage
2	Terengganu U21	18	9	3	6	27	28	−1	30	Qualification for Knockout Stage
3	Johor Darul Ta'zim III	18	7	8	3	22	14	+8	29	Qualification for Knockout Stage
4	Kelantan U21	18	7	7	4	35	20	+15	28	Qualification for Knockout Stage
5	Felda United U21	18	7	6	5	23	21	+2	27	
6	Penang U21	18	6	5	7	24	20	+4	23	
7	UiTM U21	18	6	5	7	19	26	−7	23	
8	PDRM U21	18	5	6	7	14	17	−3	21	
9	Sarawak U21	18	4	8	6	17	19	−2	20	
10	Melaka U21	18	1	4	13	12	39	−27	7	

Updated to match(es) played on 31 July 2017. Source: FAM, Liga Malaysia
Rules for classification: 1) Points; 2) Goal difference; 3) Number of goals scored.

=== Group B ===
Pos	Team	Pld	W	D	L	GF	GA	GD	Pts	Qualification or relegation
1	Negeri Sembilan U21	18	10	5	3	25	15	+10	35	Qualification for Knockout Stage
2	Selangor U21	18	8	7	3	26	10	+16	31	Qualification for Knockout Stage
3	T-Team U21	18	8	6	4	29	9	+20	30	Qualification for Knockout Stage
4	Kuala Lumpur U21	18	8	6	4	20	12	+8	30	Qualification for Knockout Stage
5	PKNP U21	18	8	6	4	24	20	+4	30	
6	PKNS U21	18	7	7	4	31	18	+13	28	
7	Pahang U21	18	6	6	6	18	16	+2	24	
8	Perak U21	18	4	5	9	15	24	−9	17	
9	Sabah U21	18	2	6	10	13	24	−11	12	
10	ATM U21	18	1	2	15	10	63	−53	5	

Updated to match(es) played on 31 July 2017. Source: FAM, Liga Malaysia
Rules for classification: 1) Points; 2) Goal difference; 3) Number of goals scored.

== Result table ==
=== Group A ===
Home \ Away	FEL	JDT	KED	KEL	MEL	PDRM	PEN	SWK	TRG	UIT
Felda United		2–2	1–2	1–0	2–0	0–0	2–1	1–1	0–1	1–1
Johor DT	0–0		1–2	1–1	2–0	0–1	2–0	2–1	2–2	1–1
Kedah	3–1	1–2		1–2	2–0	1–0	1–0	1–1	2–0	0–0
Kelantan	1–1	2–2	3–1		8–1	0–1	1–1	2–1	3–4	1–1
Melaka United	1–3	0–3	1–1	1–1		1–1	0–2	1–0	1–2	1–3
PDRM	2–3	0–0	1–3	0–1	1–0		1–0	2–2	0–1	0–1
Penang	1–2	1–0	0–0	0–4	2–1	1–1		1–1	3–0	6–1
Sarawak	0–1	0–1	1–0	1–0	1–1	1–1	1–1		1–0	1–1
Terengganu	4–2	0–0	1–4	2–2	2–1	2–1	0–3	2–1		3–0
UiTM	1–0	0–1	1–2	0–3	3–1	0–1	2–1	1–2	2–1	

Updated to match(es) played on 31 July 2017. Source: FAM
Legend: Blue = home team win; Yellow = draw; Red = away team win.

=== Group B ===
Home \ Away	ATM	KLU	NSE	PHG	PRK	PKP	PKN	SAB	SEL	TTE
ATM		0–2	0–1	0–3	1–0	0–3	1–7	0–3	1–3	1–5
Kuala Lumpur	6–0		0–0	0–0	0–0	3–1	0–3	1–0	0–0	1–0
Negeri Sembilan	3–0	1–1		2–2	3–2	2–0	0–2	3–1	2–0	2–1
Pahang	1–1	2–0	1–2		0–1	1–1	0–0	2–0	1–0	0–3
Perak	1–1	0–3	2–0	0–2		1–1	1–1	1–0	1–2	0–0
PKNP	4–1	1–0	1–0	2–0	2–1		4–3	2–0	0–2	0–4
PKNS	6–1	1–2	0–0	1–0	4–2	0–0		1–1	0–0	0–1
Sabah	3–0	0–1	1–2	2–2	0–1	1–1	1–1		0–2	0–0
Selangor	6–1	3–0	1–1	0–1	1–0	1–1	4–0	0–0		0–0
T–Team	6–1	0–0	0–1	1–0	3–1	0–0	0–1	4–0	1–1	

Updated to match(es) played on 31 July 2017. Source: FAM
Legend: Blue = home team win; Yellow = draw; Red = away team win.

== Knock-out stage ==
=== Bracket ===
Quarter-finals
Kuala Lumpur	0	1	1
Kedah	2	2	4
(Johor) JDT III	0	0	0
Selangor	0	2	2
Kelantan (a)	1	1	2
(Negeri Sembilan) N. Sembilan	0	2	2
(Terengganu) T-Team	1	1	2
Terengganu	1	2	3

Semi-Finals
Kedah	0	1	1
Selangor (a)	0	1	1
Kelantan	1	2	3
Terengganu (a)	1	2	3

Final
Selangor	2	0	2
Terengganu	0	1	1

=== Quarterfinals ===
The first legs were played on 21 September, and the second legs were played on 26 September 2017.

Team 1	Agg.	Team 2	1st leg	2nd leg
Kuala Lumpur	1–4	Kedah	0–2	1–2
JDT III (Johor)	0–2	Selangor	0–0	0–2
Kelantan	2–2 (a)	(Negeri Sembilan) N. Sembilan	1–0	1–2
T-Team (Terengganu)	2–3	Terengganu	1–1	1–2

First Leg

21 September 2017
16:45 UTC+8

Kuala Lumpur	0–2	Kedah
		Zulfahamzie Tarmizi 4'; Aminuddin Abu Bakar

UKM Mini Stadium

Second Leg

26 September 2017
20:45 UTC+8

Kedah	2–1	Kuala Lumpur
Hidzir Idris 57'; Zulfahamzie Tarmizi 88'		Hafifi Salleh 61'

Darul Aman Stadium

Kedah won 4–1 on aggregate.

First Leg

21 September 2017
16:45 UTC+8

JDT III (Johor)	0–0	Selangor

Pasir Gudang Corporation Stadium

Second Leg

26 September 2017
16:15 UTC+8

Selangor	2–0	(Johor) JDT III
Azizul Baharuddin 64'; Faizzudin Abidin 65'

MP Sepang Mini Stadium

Selangor won 2–0 on aggregate.

First Leg

21 September 2017
16:45 UTC+8

Kelantan	1–0	(Negeri Sembilan) N. Sembilan
Danial Ashraf Abdullah 8'

Sultan Muhammad IV Stadium

Second Leg

26 September 2017
16:15 UTC+8

N. Sembilan (Negeri Sembilan)	2–1	Kelantan
Fauzi Abdul Latiff 31'; G Durrkeswaran 73'		Wan Azam Mazlan 51'

USIM Mini Stadium

2–2 on aggregate. Kelantan won on away goals.

First Leg

21 September 2017
16:45 UTC+8

T-Team (Terengganu)	1–1	Terengganu
Akram Asidi 30'		Ridzuan Razali 82'

Sultan Mizan Zainal Abidin Stadium

Second Leg

26 September 2017
16:15 UTC+8

Terengganu	2–1	(Terengganu) T-Team
Al Imran Abd Aziz 40'; Ridzuan Razali 90+2'		Engku Nur Syakir 10'

Sultan Mizan Zainal Abidin Stadium

Terengganu won 3–2 on aggregate.

=== Semifinals ===
The first legs were played on 1 and 2 October, and the second legs were played on 6 October 2017.

Team 1	Agg.	Team 2	1st leg	2nd leg
Selangor	1–1 (a)	Kedah	0–0	1–1
Terengganu	3–3 (a)	Kelantan	1–1	2–2

First Leg

2 October 2017
16:45 UTC+8

Selangor	0–0	Kedah

Selayang Stadium

Second Leg

6 October 2017
20:45 UTC+8

Kedah	1–1	Selangor
Suhaimi Saad 15'		Faizzudin Abidin 20'

Darul Aman Stadium

1–1 on aggregate. Selangor won on away goals.

First Leg

1 October 2017
16:45 UTC+8

Terengganu	1–1	Kelantan
Aliff Fitri Jefri 75'		Nik Akif Syahiran 73'

Sultan Mizan Zainal Abidin Stadium

Second Leg

6 October 2017
20:45 UTC+8

Kelantan	2–2	Terengganu
Nik Azli Nik Alias 67'; Danial Ashraf Abdullah 87'		Haidhir Suhaini 72', 74'

Sultan Muhammad IV Stadium

3–3 on aggregate. Terengganu won on away goals.

== Final ==
Team 1	Agg.	Team 2	1st leg	2nd leg
Selangor	2–1	Terengganu	2–0	0–1

First Leg

13 October 2017
20:45 UTC+8

Selangor	2–0	Terengganu
Badrul Amin Rusalan 15'; Muhd Syahmi Safari 28'

MP Selayang Stadium

Second Leg

20 October 2017
20:45 UTC+8

Terengganu	1–0	Selangor
Haidhir Suhaini 24'

Sultan Ismail Nasiruddin Shah Stadium

Selangor won 2–1 on aggregate.

== Champions ==
Champions
Selangor U21

== Season statistics ==
=== Top scorers ===
As of matches played on 9 March 2017.

Rank	Player	Club	Goals
1	Sean Eugene Selvaraj	Negeri Sembilan U21	5
2	Shahrul Nizam Ros Hasni	Kelantan U21	3
2	Fazriel Hanafi	Sabah U21	3
2	Syahidan Rajak	PKNS U21	3
2	Nur Iqmal	PKNS U21	3

== See also ==
- 2017 Malaysia Super League
- 2017 Malaysia Premier League
- 2017 Malaysia FAM League
- 2017 Malaysia FA Cup
- 2017 Malaysia Youth League
