= Alfonso de la Cruz =

Spanish footballer

Personal information
- Full name: Alfonso de la Cruz Calero
- Date of birth: 17 July 1986 (age 40)
- Place of birth: Villarrobledo, Spain
- Height: 1.86 m (6 ft 1 in)
- Position: Centre-back

Team information
- Current team: Ovidiana Sulmona

Senior career*
Years	Team	Apps	(Gls)
2008–2009	Águilas	30	(0)
2009–2010	Almería B	24	(0)
2010–2011	Caravaca	34	(2)
2011–2012	Lorca Atlético	34	(1)
2012–2013	Toledo	0	(0)
2014–2015	Somozas	19	(0)
2015–2018	Ebro	88	(1)
2018	Selangor	6	(0)
2019–2020	PSS Sleman	18	(0)
2021–2024	Villarrobledo	58	(0)
2024–	Ovidiana Sulmona		
- * Club domestic league appearances and goals as of 21 January 2024

Alfonso de la Cruz Calero (born 17 July 1986) is a Spanish footballer who plays as a centre-back for Italian fifth-tier Eccellenza club Ovidiana Sulmona.
