= Amirul Ashraf =

Malaysian footballer

Personal information
- Full name: Muhammad Amirul Ashraf bin Ariffin
- Date of birth: 22 January 1998 (age 28)
- Place of birth: Selangor, Malaysia
- Height: 1.70 m (5 ft 7 in)
- Position: Centre-back

Team information
- Current team: Sarawak United FC
- Number: 22

Youth career
- 2013–2014: Malaysia Pahang Sports School
- 2015: Frenz United
- 2016: Selangor U-19

Senior career*
Years	Team	Apps	(Gls)
2017–2020	Selangor	8	(0)
2019–2020	→ UiTM (loan)	10	(0)
2021	Perak II	0	(0)
2022–	Sarawak United FC	0	(0)

International career^{‡}
2013–2015	Malaysia U-17	8	(0)
2016–2020	Malaysia U-23	12	(0)
- * Club domestic league appearances and goals as of December 06, 2020 ‡ National team caps and goals as of November 02, 2019

Muhammad Amirul Ashraf bin Ariffin (born 22 January 1998) is a Malaysian footballer who plays as a centre-back for Sarawak United in Malaysia Super League.

== Club career ==
=== Early years ===
Born in Selangor, Amirul Ashraf played for Malaysia Pahang Sports School (MPSS) from 2013 to 2014. After that, he joined Frenz United temporarily to develop his talent before move to Selangor's youth team in 2016. He also was one of the players representing the Selangor football in sporting events (Sukma) in Sarawak.

=== Selangor ===
In December 2016, Coach Selangor P. Maniam confirmed that Amirul Ashraf would be definitely promoted to Selangor's first team in 2017 season.

== Career statistics ==
=== Club ===
As of 30 June 2018.

Appearances and goals by club, season and competition
Club	Season	League			Cup		League Cup		Continental^{1}		Total	
Club	Season	Division	Apps	Goals	Apps	Goals	Apps	Goals	Apps	Goals	Apps	Goals
Selangor	2017	Malaysia Super League	1	0	0	0	0	0	–		1	0
Selangor	2018	Malaysia Super League	7	0	3	0	0	0	–		10	0
Selangor	Total		8	0	3	0	0	0	0	0	11	0
Career Total			0	0	0	0	0	0	0	0	0	0

^{1} Includes AFC Cup and AFC Champions League.
