= Syahmi Safari =

Malaysian footballer

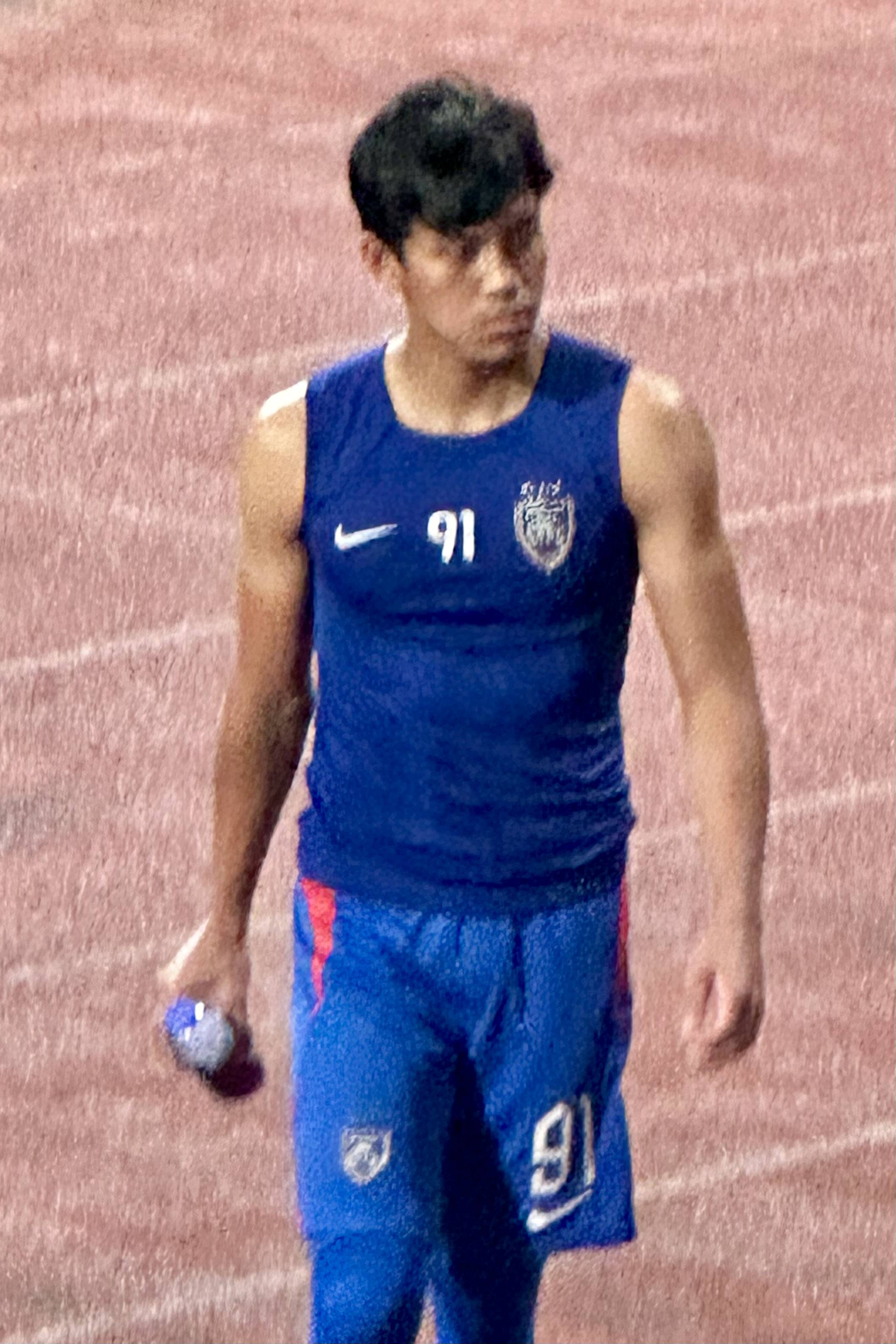
- Syahmi with Johor Darul Ta'zim in 2024

Personal information
- Full name: Muhammad Syahmi bin Safari
- Date of birth: 5 February 1998 (age 28)
- Place of birth: Kuala Selangor, Malaysia
- Height: 1.73 m (5 ft 8 in)
- Position: Full-back

Team information
- Current team: Johor Darul Ta'zim
- Number: 91

Youth career
- 2012–2013: Bukit Jalil Sports School
- 2013–2014: Harimau Muda C
- 2015–2016: Selangor U19

Senior career*
Years	Team	Apps	(Gls)
2017–2021	Selangor	80	(11)
2022–	Johor Darul Ta'zim	26	(3)

International career^{‡}
2013–2017	Malaysia U19	15	(4)
2016–2019	Malaysia U23	20	(2)
2018–	Malaysia	29	(1)
Medal record
Men's football
Representing Malaysia
FIFA ASEAN Cup
Third place	2026
AFF Championship
Runner-up	2018
Malaysia under-23
Sea Games
Second place	2017
- * Club domestic league appearances and goals as of 6 October 2024 ‡ National team caps and goals as of 6 October 2026

Muhammad Syahmi bin Safari (born 5 February 1998) is a Malaysian professional footballer who plays as a full-back for Malaysia Super League club Johor Darul Ta'zim and the Malaysia national team.

== Club career ==
=== Early life ===
Born and raised in Kuala Selangor, Syahmi was in the Selangor's youth team at the age of 17, having arrived from local side Bukit Jalil Sport School and Harimau Muda C.

=== Selangor ===
Syahmi was a key player for Selangor President Cup and Academy, making 46 appearances and scoring two goals. In December 2016, Selangor head coach, P. Maniam confirmed that Syahmi would be definitely promoted to Selangor's first team. Syahmi marked his debut and play 90 minutes of a 2–0 win against Penang in Super League match. On 4 February 2017, Syahmi scored his first Super League goal (and his first goal with Selangor's first team) against PKNS FC, which Selangor lost 5–3.

=== Johor Darul Ta'zim ===
On 13 January 2022, it was announced that Syahmi had agreed to sign with champions Johor Darul Ta'zim. He was assigned the number 91.

== International career ==
On 25 August 2016, Syahmi was called up to the Malaysia U-21 for the Under-21 AFF Championship in 2016. Syahmi also made appearances during the 2017 Southeast Asian Games in Kuala Lumpur.

On 5 December 2018, he scored his first senior international goal against Thailand in the 2018 AFF Championship at the Rajamangala Stadium.

On 6 December 2021, Syahmi was called up to the Malaysia national football team for the 2020 AFF Championship, where he played at left back. He represented the nation at the 2023 AFC Asian Cup.

== Career statistics ==
=== Club ===
As of match played 16 December 2023

Club	Season	League			Cup (Note: Includes Malaysia FA Cup)		League Cup (Note: Includes Malaysia Cup)		Continental (Note: Includes AFC Champions League and AFC Cup)		Total	
Club	Season	Division	Apps	Goals	Apps	Goals	Apps	Goals	Apps	Goals	Apps	Goals
Selangor	2017	Malaysia Super League	19	3	1	0	6	1	—		26	4
Selangor	2018	Malaysia Super League	13	5	5	1	3	0	—		21	6
Selangor	2019	Malaysia Super League	17	2	1	1	10	0	—		28	3
Selangor	2020	Malaysia Super League	10	0	0	0	1	0	—		11	0
Selangor	2021	Malaysia Super League	21	1	0	0	6	0	—		27	1
Selangor	Total		80	11	7	2	26	1	—		113	14
Johor Darul Ta'zim	2022	Malaysia Super League	11	1	1	1	0	0	0	0	12	2
Johor Darul Ta'zim	2023	Malaysia Super League	12	1	0	0	0	0	—		12	1
Career total			103	13	8	3	26	1	0	0	136	16

=== International ===
As of match played 6 October 2026

Appearances and goals by national team and year
National team	Year	Apps	Goals
Malaysia	2018	12	1
Malaysia	2019	6	0
Malaysia	2021	5	0
Malaysia	2022	1	0
Malaysia	2023	1	0
Malaysia	2024	1	0
Malaysia	2026	3	0
Total		29	1

==== International goals ====
As of match played 6 October 2026. Malaysia score listed first, score column indicates score after each Syahmi Safari goal.

International goals by date, venue, cap, opponent, score, result and competition
No.	Date	Venue	Cap	Opponent	Score	Result	Competition
1	5 December 2018	Rajamangala Stadium, Bangkok, Thailand	11	Thailand	1–1	2–2	2018 AFF Championship

== Honours ==
=== Club ===
Selangor

- President Cup: 2017

Johor Darul Ta'zim

- Malaysia Super League: 2022, 2023, 2024–25
- Malaysia FA Cup: 2022, 2023, 2024
- Malaysia Cup: 2022, 2023, 2024–25
- Piala Sumbangsih: 2022, 2023, 2024, 2025

=== International ===
Malaysia U23

- Southeast Asian Games

(silver) Silver Medal: 2017

Malaysia

- AFF Championship runner-up: 2018

=== Individual ===
- 2018 AFF Championship: Best Goal
- 2018 AFF Championship: Best Eleven
- AFF Best XI: 2019
