= 2021 Sabah F.C. season =

Sabah
2021 season
- CEO: Khairul Firdaus Akbar Khan
- Manager: Ahmad Marzuki Nasir
- Head coach: Kurniawan Dwi Yulianto (until 29 August); Burhan Ajui (caretaker); Ong Kim Swee (from 1 October)
- Stadium: Likas Stadium
- Malaysia Super League: 9th
- Malaysia Cup: Quarter-finals
- Top goalscorer: League: Amri Yahyah; Lévy Madinda (4); All: Amri Yahyah (5)
- Highest home attendance: 0
- Lowest home attendance: 0
- Average home league attendance: 0
Home colours	Away colours	Third colours

The 2021 season was Sabah's sixth competitive season in the highest tier of Malaysian football since the foundation of Malaysia Super League in 2004. It is also the second season for Sabah to play in Malaysia Super League after winning the 2019 Malaysia Premier League which got promoted.

== Players ==
=== First-team squad ===
As of 1 August 2021

2021 Note: Flags indicate national team as defined under FIFA eligibility rules; some limited exceptions apply. Players may hold more than one non-FIFA nationality.

No.	Pos.	Nation	Player
1	GK	(Malaysia) MAS	Joslan Aping
2	DF	(Malaysia) MAS	Mafry Balang
3	DF	(Malaysia) MAS	Rawilson Batuil (vice-captain)
4	DF	(Malaysia) MAS	Dendy Lowa
5	DF	(North Macedonia) MKD	Risto Mitrevski (captain)
6	DF	(South Korea) KOR	Park Tae-Soo
8	MF	(Malaysia) MAS	Azzizan Nordin
9	FW	(Malaysia) MAS	Bobby Gonzales
10	FW	(Croatia) CRO	Josip Ivančić
11	MF	(Malaysia) MAS	Alto Linus
13	MF	(Malaysia) MAS	Hamran Peter
14	DF	(Malaysia) MAS	Jenius Karib
15	DF	(Malaysia) MAS	Randy Baruh
17	FW	(Malaysia) MAS	Amri Yahyah
18	MF	(Malaysia) MAS	Azwan Fattah
19	MF	(Malaysia) MAS	Ummareng Bacok
20	MF	(Malaysia) MAS	Ricco Nigel Milus

No.	Pos.	Nation	Player
21	FW	(Malaysia) MAS	Maxsius Musa
22	GK	(Malaysia) MAS	Robson Rendy Rining
24	MF	(Malaysia) MAS	Syukri Baharun
26	FW	(Malaysia) MAS	Rahman Shah
27	FW	(Malaysia) MAS	N.Thanabalan
30	GK	(Malaysia) MAS	Rozaimie Rohim
35	GK	(Malaysia) MAS	Azlizan Azlan
36	DF	(Malaysia) MAS	Hanafie Tokyo
37	DF	(Malaysia) MAS	Gerald Gadit
38	FW	(Malaysia) MAS	Hizaz Lokman
39	MF	(Malaysia) MAS	Nureizkhan Isa
40	MF	(Malaysia) MAS	Sahrizan Saidin
41	GK	(Malaysia) MAS	Azrin Paiting
42	FW	(Malaysia) MAS	Harith Naem
48	MF	(Indonesia) IDN	Saddil Ramdani
77	DF	(Malaysia) MAS	Nazirul Naim (on loan from Perak)

=== Out on loan ===
Note: Flags indicate national team as defined under FIFA eligibility rules; some limited exceptions apply. Players may hold more than one non-FIFA nationality.

No.	Pos.	Nation	Player
16	MF	(Malaysia) MAS	Ariusdius Jais (to Kelantan United until 30 November 2021)
23	DF	(Malaysia) MAS	Sabri Sahar (to Sarawak United until 30 November 2021)
25	DF	(Malaysia) MAS	Evan Wensley (to Kelantan United until 30 November 2021)

== Squad statistics ==
=== Appearances and goals ===
As of 18 November 2021

No.	Pos.	Player	League		Malaysia Cup		Total	
No.	Pos.	Player	Apps	Goals	Apps	Goals	Apps	Goals
2	DF	(Malaysia) Mafry Balang	3(2)	0	0	0	5	0
3	DF	(Malaysia) Rawilson Batuil	18(2)	0	3(3)	0	26	0
4	DF	(Malaysia) Dendy Lowa	5(4)	0	1(1)	0	11	0
5	DF	(North Macedonia) Risto Mitrevski	19	0	8	4	27	4
6	DF	(South Korea) Park Tae-soo	18	2	7	1	25	3
7	MF	(Gabon) Lévy Madinda	14(2)	4	1(2)	0	19	4
8	MF	(Malaysia) Azzizan Nordin	11(3)	1	6(1)	0	21	1
9	FW	(Malaysia) Bobby Gonzales	5(8)	2	0(5)	0	18	2
10	FW	(Croatia) Josip Ivančić	7	2	0	0	7	2
11	MF	(Malaysia) Alto Linus	20	0	6	0	26	0
13	MF	(Malaysia) Hamran Peter	7(5)	1	0	0	12	1
14	DF	(Malaysia) Jenius Karib	0(1)	0	0(2)	0	3	0
15	DF	(Malaysia) Randy Baruh	14(4)	0	1	0	19	0
17	MF	(Malaysia) Amri Yahyah	17(5)	4	8	1	30	5
19	MF	(Malaysia) Ummareng Bacok	4(2)	0	7(1)	0	14	0
20	MF	(Malaysia) Ricco Nigel Milus	6(6)	0	0	0	12	0
21	FW	(Malaysia) Maxsius Musa	6(6)	0	2	0	14	0
22	GK	(Malaysia) Rendy Rining	16	0	2	0	18	0
24	MF	(Malaysia) Syukri Baharun	12(4)	0	3	0	19	0
26	FW	(Malaysia) Rahman Shah	0(3)	0	0	0	3	0
27	FW	(Malaysia) Thanabalan Nadarajah	1(1)	0	6(2)	0	10	0
30	GK	(Malaysia) Rozaimie Rohim	6(1)	0	6	0	13	0
36	MF	(Malaysia) Hanafie Tokyo	1(3)	0	6(2)	0	12	0
37	DF	(Malaysia) Gerald Gadit	0	0	5(1)	0	6	0
39	MF	(Malaysia) Nureizkhan Isa	1(1)	0	0(4)	0	6	0
40	MF	(Malaysia) Sahrizan Saidin	1(3)	0	1(5)	1	10	1
42	FW	(Malaysia) Harith Naem	0(2)	0	5(2)	0	9	0
43	MF	(Malaysia) Naaim Firdaus	1	0	0	0	1	0
48	MF	(Indonesia) Saddil Ramdani	17(1)	3	0(1)	0	19	3
77	DF	(Malaysia) Nazirul Naim	4(2)	0	4(2)	0	12	0
Players transferred/loaned out during the season
10	FW	(Liberia) Sam Johnson	7(3)	2	0	0	10	2
16	MF	(Malaysia) Ariusdius Jais	0(1)	0	0	0	1	0
23	DF	(Malaysia) Sabri Sahar	1(3)	0	0	0	4	0

== Competitions ==
=== Malaysia Super League ===
==== League table ====
Pos	Team	Pld	W	D	L	GF	GA	GD	Pts	Qualification or relegation
7	Petaling Jaya City	22	6	6	10	16	28	−12	24	
8	Melaka United	22	5	9	8	25	31	−6	21 (Note: Melaka have been docked three points based on the following of the decision from FAM (Football Association of Malaysia).)	
9	Sabah	22	4	7	11	21	38	−17	19	
10	Sri Pahang	22	4	6	12	23	37	−14	18	
11	Perak (R)	22	4	4	14	20	45	−25	16	Relegation to Malaysia Premier League

Source: Malaysian Football League
Rules for classification: 1) Points; 2) Goal difference; 3) Number of goals scored.
(R) Relegated

==== Fixtures and Results ====
Win Draw Loss

6 March 2021 1	Melaka United	1–1	Sabah	Krubong
21:00 MYT	Kumaahran 63'	Report	Hamran 45'	Stadium: Hang Jebat Stadium; Attendance: 0 Referee: Khirulazuan Kidam

9 March 2021 2	Kedah Darul Aman	2–0	Sabah	Alor Setar
21:00 MYT		Report	Tchétché 15'; Sherman 21'	Stadium: Darul Aman Stadium; Attendance: 0 Referee: Suhaimi Mat Hassan

13 March 2021 3	Sabah	0–1	Petaling Jaya City	Kota Kinabalu
20:15 MYT		Report	Darren 28'	Stadium: Likas Stadium; Attendance: 0 Referee: Tuan Mohd Yaasin Tuan Mohd Hanafiah

16 March 2021 4	Sri Pahang	2–1	Sabah	Kuantan
21:00 MYT	Bokhashvili 55'; Tuck 70'	Report	Saddil 80'	Stadium: Darul Makmur Stadium; Attendance: 0 Referee: Fitri Maskon

21 March 2021 5	Sabah	2–1	Terengganu	Kota Kinabalu
20:15 MYT	Madinda 38' (pen.); Johnson 42'	Report	Mintah 79'	Stadium: Likas Stadium; Attendance: 0 Referee: Khirulazuan Kidam

3 April 2021 6	Kuala Lumpur City	0–0	Sabah	Cheras
21:00 MYT		Report		Stadium: Kuala Lumpur Stadium; Attendance: 1,109; Referee: Mohd Nafeez Abd Wahab

6 April 2021 7	Sabah	1–4	Johor Darul Ta'zim	Kota Kinabalu
20:15 MYT	Madinda 58' (pen.)	Report	Arif 7'; Bergson 8', 68'; Velázquez 87' (pen.)	Stadium: Likas Stadium; Attendance: 3,507; Referee: Suhaimi Mat Hassan

11 April 2021 8	Penang	1–1	Sabah	George Town
21:00 MYT	Casagrande 86'	Report	Saddil 52'	Stadium: City Stadium; Attendance: 2,000; Referee: Razlan Joffri Ali

17 April 2021 9	Sabah	4–0	UiTM	Kota Kinabalu
22:00 MYT	Johnson 28'; Saddil 41'; Park 50'; Bobby 57'	Report		Stadium: Likas Stadium; Attendance: 1,405; Referee: Fitri Maskon

23 April 2021 10	Selangor	2–2	Sabah	Cheras
22:00 MYT	Ifedayo 57', 72'	Report	Amri 31'; Bobby 88'	Stadium: MBPJ Stadium; Attendance: 1,697; Referee: Suhaizi Shukri

2 May 2021 11	Sabah	2–1	Perak	Kota Kinabalu
21:15 MYT	Amri 65'; Madinda 79'	Report	Nazirul 27'	Stadium: Likas Stadium; Attendance: 1,741; Referee: Mohd Nafeez Abd Wahab

5 May 2021 12	Sabah	3–1	Melaka United	Kota Kinabalu
21:15 MYT	Amri 6', 47'; Azzizan 16'	Report	Fakhrullah 66'	Stadium: Likas Stadium; Attendance: 1,741; Referee: Zulkarnain Zakaria

8 May 2021 13	Sabah	0–1	Kedah Darul Aman	Kota Kinabalu
21:15 MYT		Report	Sherman 79'	Stadium: Likas Stadium; Attendance: 2,000; Referee: Tuan Mohd Yaasin Tuan Mohd Hanafiah

24 July 2021 14	Petaling Jaya City	1–0	Sabah	Kelana Jaya
21:00 MYT	Sunil 89'	Report		Stadium: MBPJ Stadium; Attendance: 0 Referee: Hamdan Awang

28 July 2021 15	Sabah	2–2	Sri Pahang	Kota Kinabalu
21:15 MYT	Ivančić 58', 90+4'	Report	Baqiuddin 67'; Malik 90+3'	Stadium: Likas Stadium; Attendance: 0 Referee: Zamzaidi Katimin

1 August 2021 16	Terengganu	0–0	Sabah	Kuala Nerus
21:00 MYT		Report		Stadium: Sultan Mizan Zainal Abidin Stadium; Attendance: 0 Referee: Suhaizi Shukri

3 August 2021 17	Sabah	1–1	Kuala Lumpur City	Kota Kinabalu
20:15 MYT	Madinda 65'	Report	Randy 22' (o.g.)	Stadium: Likas Stadium; Attendance: 0 Referee: Tuan Mohd Yaasin Tuan Mohd Hanafiah

8 August 2021 18	Johor Darul Ta'zim	2–0	Sabah	Iskandar Puteri
21:00 MYT	Bergson 19', 21'; Safawi (yellow card) 11'; Davies (yellow card) 45'; Lowrey (yellow card) 74'; Guilherme (yellow card) 90+1'	Report	Ricco (yellow card) 8'; Randy (yellow card) 42'; Hanafie (yellow card) 71'; Maxsius (yellow card) 90+2'	Stadium: Sultan Ibrahim Stadium; Attendance: 0 Referee: Razlan Joffri Ali

22 August 2021 19	Sabah	0–3	Penang	Kota Kinabalu
20:15 MYT	Alto (yellow card) 54'; Rawilson (yellow card) 86'	Report	Casagrande 38', 55'; Boboev 68'	Stadium: Likas Stadium; Attendance: 0 Referee: Tuan Mohd Yaasin Tuan Mohd Hanafiah

28 August 2021 20	UiTM	4–0	Sabah	Shah Alam
21:00 MYT	Kwon 15' (pen.); Vinicius 17'; Giannelli 59', 66'	Report	Ummareng (yellow card) 45+2'; Saddil (yellow card) 88'	Stadium: UiTM Stadium; Attendance: 0 Referee: Fitri Maskon

5 September 2021 21	Sabah	0–6	Selangor	Kota Kinabalu
20:15 MYT	Mitrevski (yellow card) 90+1'	Report	Ifedayo 22', 24', 89'; Sarkunan (yellow card) 45'; Mukhairi 45+1'; Hakim 46'; Danial 75'	Stadium: Likas Stadium; Attendance: 0 Referee: Zulkarnain Zakaria

12 September 2021 22	Perak	2–1	Sabah	Ipoh
21:00 MYT	Poku 20', 70'; Machell (yellow card) 51'	Report	Hamran (yellow card) 55'; Park 85'; Thanabalan (yellow card) 86'	Stadium: Perak Stadium; Attendance: 0 Referee: Abdul Rahman Wahab

=== Malaysia Cup ===
==== Group stage ====
The draw for the group stage was held on 15 September 2021.

Pos	Team	Pld	W	D	L	GF	GA	GD	Pts	Qualification	JDT	SBH	PJC	KEL
1	Johor Darul Ta'zim	6	6	0	0	14	1	+13	18	Quarter-finals	—	3–0	1–0	2–0
2	Sabah	6	2	2	2	6	9	−3	8	Quarter-finals	0–2	—	1–0	2–1
3	Petaling Jaya City	6	1	2	3	5	6	−1	5		1–2	1–1	—	3–1
4	Kelantan	6	0	2	4	4	13	−9	2		0–4	2–2	0–0	—

Source: MFL, FAM

27 September 2021 1	Petaling Jaya City	1–1	Sabah	Kelana Jaya
21:00 UTC +8	Raffi (yellow card) 66'; Darren 80'	Report	Park 20'; Amri (yellow card) 90+1'	Stadium: MBPJ Stadium; Attendance: 0 Referee: Zulkarnain Zakaria

30 September 2021 2	Kelantan	2–2	Sabah	Kota Bharu
21:00 UTC +8	Natanael 39'; Ismail (yellow card) 60'; Haziq 70'; Intzidis (yellow card) 83'	Report	Mitrevski 32' (pen.), 80' (pen.); Thanabalan (yellow card) 90+1'	Stadium: Sultan Muhammad IV Stadium; Attendance: 0 Referee: Fitri Maskon

29 October 2021 3	Sabah	0–2	Johor Darul Ta'zim	Kota Kinabalu
20:15 UTC +8	Ummareng (yellow card) 21'; Sahrizan (yellow card) 48'; Park (yellow card) 57'	Report	Hazwan 5'; Cabrera 13'; Leandro (yellow card) 35'; Sumareh (yellow card) 90+3'	Stadium: Likas Stadium; Attendance: 4,729; Referee: Tuan Mohd Yaasin Tuan Mohd Hanafiah

2 November 2021 4	Johor Darul Ta'zim	3–0	Sabah	Iskandar Puteri
21:00 UTC +8	Leandro 6'; Bergson 34' (pen.), 90+3'	Report		Stadium: Sultan Ibrahim Stadium; Attendance: 8,699; Referee: Zulkarnain Zakaria

6 November 2021 5	Sabah	2–1	Kelantan	Kota Kinabalu
20:15 UTC +8	Amri 7' (pen.); Sahrizan 90+1'	Report	Safwan 5'	Stadium: Likas Stadium; Attendance: 2,256; Referee: Mohammad Zamzaidi Katimin

9 November 2021 6	Sabah	1–0	Petaling Jaya City	Kota Kinabalu
20:15 UTC +8	Mitrevski 21' (pen.)	Report		Stadium: Likas Stadium; Attendance: 3,217; Referee: Zulkarnain Zakaria

==== Knockout stage ====
===== Quarter-finals =====
14 November 2021 First leg	Sabah	0–1	Melaka United	Kota Kinabalu
20:15 UTC +8		Report	Norde 52'	Stadium: Likas Stadium; Attendance: 7,213; Referee: Ahmad Zuhaidi Dzulkifli

18 November 2021 Second leg	Melaka United	2–1 (3–1 agg.)	Sabah	Krubong
21:00 UTC +8	Adriano 3'; Norde 77'	Report	Mitrevski 90+4' (pen.)	Stadium: Hang Jebat Stadium; Attendance: 6,328; Referee: Mohd Fairuzi Mat Desa
