= 2022 Petaling Jaya City FC season =

Petaling Jaya City
2022 season
- Owner: Vijay Eswaran
- President: Subahan Kamal
- Head coach: Maniam Pachaiappan
- Stadium: MBPJ Stadium
- Malaysia Super League: 9th
- Malaysia FA Cup: Second round
- Malaysia Cup: Round of 16
- Top goalscorer: League: Darren Lok (10); All: Darren Lok (11)
Home colours	Away colours

The 2022 season was Petaling Jaya City FC's 19th season since its establishment in 2004. The club participated in the Malaysia Super League for the 4th time since 2019.

== Players ==
As of 7 January 2022

No	Position	Player	Nation
1	GK	MAS	Aqil Razak
2	DF	MAS	Aroon Kumar
3	DF	MAS	Shivan Pillay
4	DF	MAS	Raffi Nagoorgani
5	DF	MAS	Kannan Kalaiselvan
6	MF	MAS	Nasir Basharudin
7	MF	MAS	Kogileswaran Raj
9	FW	MAS	Sunil Chandran
10	MF	MAS	Mahalli Jasuli
11	MF	MAS	Kugan Dhevarajan
12	FW	MAS	Kumaahran Sathasivam
14	DF	MAS	Jeremy Lim
15	FW	MAS	Marcus Mah
17	DF	MAS	Rajes Perumal
18	DF	MAS	Khyril Muhymeen
19	FW	MAS	Ruventhiran Vengadesan
21	DF	MAS	Prabakaran Kanadasan
22	GK	MAS	Kalamullah Al-Hafiz
23	MF	MAS	Salamon Raj
24	GK	MAS	Azfar Arif
27	DF	MAS	Filemon Anyie
28	FW	MAS	Darren Lok
30	MF	MAS	Barathkumar Ramaloo
44	FW	MAS	Saarvindran Devandran
55	DF	MAS	Tamilmaran Manimaran
70	MF	MAS	Gurusamy Kandasamy (captain)
77	FW	MAS	Syahmi Zamri
88	DF	MAS	Zainal Abidin Jamil
90	FW	MAS	Leslee Jesunathan

== Statistics ==
=== Appearances ===
Last updated on 3 February 2023.

No.	Pos	Nat	Player	Total		League		FA Cup		Malaysia Cup	
No.	Pos	Nat	Player	Apps	Goals	Apps	Goals	Apps	Goals	Apps	Goals
Goalkeepers
1	GK	(Malaysia) MAS	Aqil Razak	1	0	1	0	0	0	0	0
22	GK	(Malaysia) MAS	Kalamullah Al-Hafiz	24	0	21	0	1	0	2	0
Defenders
2	DF	(Malaysia) MAS	Aroon Kumar	20	0	17	0	0+1	0	1+1	0
3	DF	(Malaysia) MAS	Shivan Pillay	20	0	15+2	0	1	0	2	0
4	DF	(Malaysia) MAS	Raffi Nagoorgani	23	0	19+2	0	1	0	1	0
5	DF	(Malaysia) MAS	Kannan Kalaiselvan	17	0	12+3	0	1	0	1	0
17	DF	(Malaysia) MAS	Rajes Perumal	11	0	4+6	0	1	0	0	0
21	DF	(Malaysia) MAS	Prabakaran Kanadasan	17	0	14+2	0	0	0	1	0
27	DF	(Malaysia) MAS	Filemon Anyie	17	1	12+3	1	0	0	2	0
55	DF	(Malaysia) MAS	Tamilmaran Manimaran	14	0	11+1	0	0	0	2	0
88	DF	(Malaysia) MAS	Zainal Abidin Jamil	20	0	17	0	1	0	2	0
Midfielders
6	MF	(Malaysia) MAS	Nasir Basharudin	7	0	6	0	1	0	0	0
7	FW	(Malaysia) MAS	Kogileswaran Raj	22	2	3+16	2	1	0	1+1	0
10	MF	(Malaysia) MAS	Mahalli Jasuli	24	2	15+6	2	0+1	0	1+1	0
11	MF	(Malaysia) MAS	Kugan Dhevarajan	16	2	9+6	2	0	0	1	0
23	MF	(Malaysia) MAS	Salamon Raj	12	0	1+9	0	0+1	0	0+1	0
30	MF	(Malaysia) MAS	Barathkumar Ramaloo	11	1	3+8	1	0	0	0	0
70	MF	(Malaysia) MAS	Gurusamy Kandasamy	12	1	11+1	1	0	0	0	0
Forwards
9	FW	(Malaysia) MAS	Sunil Chandran	5	0	1+2	0	0	0	1+1	0
12	FW	(Malaysia) MAS	Kumaahran Sathasivam	24	3	16+5	3	1	0	1+1	0
15	FW	(Malaysia) MAS	Marcus Mah	1	0	0+1	0	0	0	0	0
18	FW	(Malaysia) MAS	Khyril Muhymeen	17	1	1+13	1	0+1	0	1+1	0
19	FW	(Malaysia) MAS	Ruventhiran Vengadesan	24	1	22	1	1	0	0+1	0
28	FW	(Malaysia) MAS	Darren Lok	23	11	20	10	1	1	2	0
44	FW	(Malaysia) MAS	Saarvindran Devandran	4	0	1+3	0	0	0	0	0
77	FW	(Malaysia) MAS	Syahmi Zamri	10	0	0+8	0	0+1	0	0+1	0
90	FW	(Malaysia) MAS	Leslee Jesunathan	2	0	0+1	0	0	0	0+1	0
Players sent out on loan this season
Player who made an appearance this season but have left the club
