= 2021 Petaling Jaya City FC season =

Petaling Jaya City
2021 season
- Owner: Vijay Eswaran
- President: Subahan Kamal
- Head coach: Maniam Pachaiappan
- Stadium: MBPJ Stadium
- Malaysia Super League: 7th
- Malaysia Cup: Group stage
- Top goalscorer: League: Darren Lok; Khyril Muhymeen (3); All: Darren Lok (6)
- Highest home attendance: 0
- Lowest home attendance: 0
- Average home league attendance: 0
| Home colours | Away colours |

The 2021 season was Petaling Jaya City FC's 18th season since its establishment in 2004. The club participated in the Malaysia Super League for the 3rd time since 2019.

== Players ==
Note: Flags indicate national team as defined under FIFA eligibility rules; some limited exceptions apply. Players may hold more than one non-FIFA nationality.

| No. | Pos. | Nation | Player |
|---|---|---|---|
| 1 | GK | MAS | Aqil Razak |
| 2 | DF | MAS | Sukri Hamid |
| 3 | DF | MAS | Subramaniam Sooryapparad |
| 4 | DF | MAS | Raffi Nagoorgani |
| 5 | DF | MAS | Kannan Kalaiselvan |
| 6 | DF | MAS | Faiz Mazlan |
| 7 | FW | MAS | Kogileswaran Raj |
| 8 | MF | MAS | Khairil Anuar |
| 9 | MF | MAS | Sunil Chandran |
| 10 | DF | MAS | Mahalli Jasuli |
| 11 | DF | MAS | Kugan Dhevarajan |
| 13 | MF | MAS | Thivandaran Karnan |
| 14 | DF | MAS | Jeremy Lim |
| 15 | DF | MAS | Youwarasan Maniom |
| 17 | DF | MAS | Rajes Perumal (3rd-captain) |

| No. | Pos. | Nation | Player |
|---|---|---|---|
| 18 | FW | MAS | Khyril Muhymeen |
| 19 | DF | MAS | Prabakaran Kanadasan |
| 21 | MF | MAS | Ruventhiran Vengadesan |
| 22 | GK | MAS | Kalamullah Al-Hafiz |
| 23 | MF | MAS | Salamon Raj (vice-captain) |
| 27 | DF | MAS | Filemon Anyie |
| 28 | FW | MAS | Darren Lok |
| 33 | GK | MAS | Syihan Hazmi |
| 36 | MF | MAS | Leslee Jesunathan |
| 33 | GK | MAS | Syihan Hazmi |
| 55 | DF | MAS | Tamilmaran Manimaran |
| 66 | DF | MAS | Nabil Hakim |
| 69 | FW | MAS | Syahmi Zamri |
| 77 | MF | MAS | Gurusamy Kandasamy (captain) |

== Transfers ==
=== Transfers in ===
| No. | Position | Player | Transferred from | Type/fee | Contract length | Date | Ref |
|---|---|---|---|---|---|---|---|
| 2 | DF | Sukri Hamid | Perak II | Free transfer | | | |
| 3 | DF | S. Subramaniam | Kuala Lumpur City | Free transfer | | | |
| 4 | DF | Raffi Nagoorgani | Penang | Free transfer | | | |
| 6 | DF | Faiz Mazlan | Felda United | Free transfer | | | |
| 8 | MF | Khairil Anuar | Perak | Free transfer | | | |
| 18 | FW | Khyril Muhymeen | Kuala Lumpur City | Free transfer | | | |
| 19 | DF | Prabakaran Kanadasan | Selangor | Free transfer | | | |
| 28 | FW | Darren Lok | Terengganu | Free transfer | | | |
| 25 | FW | (Philippines) Mark Hartmann | UiTM | End of loan | | | |
| 55 | DF | Tamilmaran Manimaran | Selangor | Free transfer | | | |
| 69 | FW | Syahmi Zamri | Selangor | Free transfer | | | |

=== Transfers to ===
| No. | Position | Player | Transferred to | Type/fee | Date | Ref |
|---|---|---|---|---|---|---|
| 1 | GK | Damien Lim | Negeri Sembilan | Free transfer | | |
| 2 | DF | Aroon Kumar | Negeri Sembilan | Free transfer | | |
| 5 | DF | (Brazil) Elizeu | Unattached | End of contract | | |
| 6 | FW | Yugan Poobathy | Unattached | End of contract | | |
| 10 | FW | Safee Sali | Kuala Lumpur City | Free transfer | | |
| 11 | FW | (Brazil) Washington Brandão | (Vietnam) Hoang Anh Gia Lai | Free transfer | | |
| 12 | MF | Barathkumar Ramaloo | Negeri Sembilan | Free transfer | | |
| 25 | FW | (Philippines) Mark Hartmann | (Philippines) United | Free transfer | | |
| 16 | MF | (Thailand) Anawin Jujeen | (Thailand) PT Prachuap | Free transfer | | |
| 19 | MF | Christie Jayaseelan | Sarawak United | Free transfer | | |
| 20 | FW | (Guinea) Demba Camara | Unattached | Mutual contract termination | | |
| 26 | DF | Amer Saidin | Sarawak United | Free transfer | | |
| 36 | DF | Fitri Omar | Kelantan United | Free transfer | | |
| 89 | DF | Yogaraj Murugan | Kelantan | Free transfer | | |
| 90 | DF | (South Korea) Kim Bong-jin | (South Korea) Gwangju | Free transfer | | |

== Squad statistics ==
=== Appearances and goals ===
As of 9 November 2021

| No. | Pos. | Player | League | | Malaysia Cup | | Total | |
| No. | Pos. | Player | Apps | Goals | Apps | Goals | Apps | Goals |
|---|---|---|---|---|---|---|---|---|
| 1 | GK | (Malaysia) Aqil Razak | 0 | 0 | 0 | 0 | 0 | 0 |
| 2 | DF | (Malaysia) Sukri Hamid | 16(1) | 0 | 2(1) | 0 | 20 | 0 |
| 3 | DF | (Malaysia) S. Subramaniam | 1(2) | 0 | 0 | 0 | 3 | 0 |
| 4 | DF | (Malaysia) Raffi Nagoorgani | 21 | 0 | 6 | 0 | 27 | 0 |
| 5 | DF | (Malaysia) Kannan Kalaiselvan | 11(7) | 0 | 2(1) | 0 | 21 | 0 |
| 6 | MF | (Malaysia) Faiz Mazlan | 12(7) | 0 | 1(2) | 0 | 22 | 0 |
| 7 | FW | (Malaysia) Kogileswaran Raj | 6(13) | 2 | 4(1) | 1 | 24 | 3 |
| 8 | MF | (Malaysia) Khairil Anuar | 0(9) | 0 | 0(1) | 0 | 10 | 0 |
| 9 | MF | (Malaysia) Sunil Chandran | 9(6) | 1 | 0(4) | 0 | 19 | 1 |
| 10 | DF | (Malaysia) Mahalli Jasuli | 12(5) | 0 | 2(3) | 0 | 21 | 0 |
| 11 | DF | (Malaysia) Kugan Dhevarajan | 15(3) | 1 | 4(1) | 0 | 23 | 1 |
| 13 | MF | (Malaysia) Thivandaran Karnan | 2(8) | 0 | 0(1) | 0 | 11 | 0 |
| 14 | DF | (Malaysia) Jeremy Lim | 7 | 0 | 0 | 0 | 7 | 0 |
| 15 | DF | (Malaysia) Youwarasan Maniom | 3(1) | 0 | 3 | 0 | 7 | 0 |
| 17 | DF | (Malaysia) Rajes Perumal | 11(3) | 1 | 2(2) | 0 | 18 | 1 |
| 18 | FW | (Malaysia) Khyril Muhymeen | 6(6) | 3 | 3(3) | 0 | 18 | 3 |
| 19 | MF | (Malaysia) Ruventhiran Vengadesan | 8(8) | 2 | 2(3) | 1 | 21 | 3 |
| 21 | DF | (Malaysia) Prabakaran Kanadasan | 21 | 0 | 6 | 0 | 27 | 0 |
| 22 | GK | (Malaysia) Kalamullah Al-Hafiz | 19 | 0 | 6 | 0 | 25 | 0 |
| 23 | MF | (Malaysia) Salamon Raj | 11(8) | 0 | 4(1) | 0 | 24 | 0 |
| 27 | DF | (Malaysia) Filemon Anyie | 15(1) | 0 | 4 | 0 | 20 | 0 |
| 28 | FW | (Malaysia) Darren Lok | 7(2) | 3 | 6 | 3 | 15 | 6 |
| 33 | GK | (Malaysia) Syihan Hazmi | 3(1) | 0 | 0 | 0 | 4 | 0 |
| 36 | MF | (Malaysia) Leslee Jesunathan | 0(1) | 0 | 0 | 0 | 1 | 0 |
| 55 | DF | (Malaysia) Tamilmaran Manimaran | 15 | 1 | 0 | 0 | 15 | 1 |
| 59 | DF | (Malaysia) Zainal Abidin Jamil | 0(1) | 0 | 3(2) | 0 | 6 | 0 |
| 66 | DF | (Malaysia) Nabil Hakim | 0(4) | 0 | 0 | 0 | 4 | 0 |
| 69 | FW | (Malaysia) Syahmi Zamri | 6(6) | 1 | 0(4) | 0 | 16 | 1 |
| 70 | MF | (Malaysia) Gurusamy Kandasamy | 15(1) | 0 | 6 | 0 | 22 | 0 |

== Competitions ==
=== Malaysia Super League ===
==== League table ====
| Pos | Team | Pld | W | D | L | GF | GA | GD | Pts | Qualification or relegation |
|---|---|---|---|---|---|---|---|---|---|---|
| 5 | Selangor | 22 | 10 | 6 | 6 | 45 | 30 | +15 | 36 | |
| 6 | Kuala Lumpur City | 22 | 8 | 9 | 5 | 27 | 20 | +7 | 33 (Note: KL City qualified to 2022 AFC Cup as winner of 2021 Malaysia Cup) | Qualification for AFC Cup group stage |
| 7 | Petaling Jaya City | 22 | 6 | 6 | 10 | 16 | 28 | −12 | 24 | |
| 8 | Melaka United | 22 | 5 | 9 | 8 | 25 | 31 | −6 | 21 (Note: Melaka have been docked three points based on the following of the decision from FAM (Football Association of Malaysia).) | |
| 9 | Sabah | 22 | 4 | 7 | 11 | 21 | 38 | −17 | 19 | |

Source: Malaysian Football League
Rules for classification: 1) Points; 2) Goal difference; 3) Number of goals scored.

==== Matches ====
Win Draw Loss

| 7 March 2021 1 | Perak | 0–0 | Petaling Jaya City | Ipoh |
| 21:00 MYT | | Report | | Stadium: Perak Stadium; Attendance: 0 Referee: Razlan Joffri Ali |

| 10 March 2021 2 | Petaling Jaya City | 2–2 | Melaka United | Kelana Jaya |
| 21:00 MYT | Darren 71', 86' (pen.) | Report | Kumaahran 56'; Faris 90+5' | Stadium: MBPJ Stadium; Attendance: 0 Referee: Mohd Fairuzi Mat Desa |

| 13 March 2021 3 | Sabah | 0–1 | Petaling Jaya City | Kota Kinabalu |
| 20:15 MYT | | Report | Darren 53' | Stadium: Likas Stadium; Attendance: 0 Referee: Tuan Mohd Yaasin |

| 17 March 2021 4 | Kedah Darul Aman | 3–1 | Petaling Jaya City | Alor Setar |
| 21:00 MYT | Baddrol 47'; Sherman 52'; Fayadh 84' | Report | Kogileswaran 39' | Stadium: Darul Aman Stadium; Attendance: 0 Referee: Mohd Fusser Mad Sallih |

| 21 March 2021 5 | Petaling Jaya City | 1–0 | Sri Pahang | Kelana Jaya |
| 21:00 MYT | Kugan 33' | Report | | Stadium: MBPJ Stadium; Attendance: 0 Referee: Tuan Mohd Yaasin |

| 2 April 2021 6 | Terengganu | 0–0 | Petaling Jaya City | Kuala Nerus |
| 21:00 MYT | | Report | | Stadium: Sultan Mizan Zainal Abidin Stadium; Attendance: 0 Referee: Zamzaidi Katimin |

| 7 April 2021 7 | Petaling Jaya City | 2–2 | Kuala Lumpur City | Kelana Jaya |
| 21:00 MYT | Irfan 50' (o.g); Kogileswaran 90+4' | Report | Paulo Josué 53'; Hadin 57' | Stadium: MBPJ Stadium; Attendance: 0 Referee: Mohd Amirul Izwan Yaacob |

| 10 April 2021 8 | Johor Darul Ta'zim | 3–0 | Petaling Jaya City | Iskandar Puteri |
| 21:00 MYT | Cabrera 1'; Bergson 20', 30' | Report | | Stadium: Sultan Ibrahim Stadium; Attendance: 2,000; Referee: Mohd Hasrol Mohd Amir |

| 18 April 2021 9 | Petaling Jaya City | 1–1 | Penang | Kelana Jaya |
| 22:00 MYT | Ruventhiran 39' | Report | Casagrande 48' | Stadium: MBPJ Stadium; Attendance: 230; Referee: Mohd Nafeez Abd Wahab |

| 24 April 2021 10 | UiTM | 0–1 | Petaling Jaya City | Shah Alam |
| 22:00 MYT | | Report | Tamilmaran 82' | Stadium: UiTM Stadium; Attendance: 78; Referee: Muhammad Usaid Jamal |

| 2 May 2021 11 | Petaling Jaya City | 1–2 | Selangor | Kelana Jaya |
| 22:00 MYT | Ruventhiran 25' | Report | Ifedayo 89', 90+3' | Stadium: MBPJ Stadium; Attendance: 920; Referee: Noor Azriel Baharudin |

| 5 May 2021 12 | Petaling Jaya City | 0–1 | Perak | Kelana Jaya |
| 22:00 MYT | | Report | Agüero 26' | Stadium: MBPJ Stadium; Attendance: 153; Referee: Muhammad Usaid Jamal |

| 9 May 2021 13 | Melaka United | 0–0 | Petaling Jaya City | Krubong |
| 22:00 MYT | | Report | | Stadium: Hang Jebat Stadium; Attendance: 367; Referee: Mohd Nafeez Abd Wahab |

| 24 July 2021 14 | Petaling Jaya City | 1–0 | Sabah | Kelana Jaya |
| 21:00 MYT | Sunil 90' | Report | | Stadium: MBPJ Stadium; Attendance: 0 Referee: Hamdan Awang |

| 1 August 2021 15 | Sri Pahang | 1–0 | Petaling Jaya City | Kuantan |
| 21:00 MYT | Aung 15'; Azam (yellow card) 27'; Hidalgo (yellow card) 78' | Report | Tamilmaran (yellow card) 55'; Salamon (yellow card) 64' | Stadium: Darul Makmur Stadium; Attendance: 0 Referee: Razlan Joffri Ali |

| 4 August 2021 16 | Petaling Jaya City | 0–3 | Terengganu | Kelana Jaya |
| 21:00 MYT | | Report | Marcel 13'; Hakimi (yellow card) 41'; da Silva 87'; Rahmat 90+2' | Stadium: MBPJ Stadium; Attendance: 0 Referee: Muhammad Nazmi Nasaruddin |

| 7 August 2021 17 | Kuala Lumpur City | 1–0 | Petaling Jaya City | Cheras |
| 21:00 UTC +8 | Paulo Josué 31' | Report | Thivandaran (yellow card) 31'; Filemon (yellow card) 41'; Rajes (yellow card) 75' | Stadium: Kuala Lumpur Stadium; Attendance: 0 Referee: Mohd Fusser Mad Sallih |

| 21 August 2021 18 | Petaling Jaya City | 0–2 | Johor Darul Ta'zim | Kelana Jaya |
| 21:00 MYT | Dhevarajan (yellow card) 46'; Filemon (yellow card) 67' | Report | Bergson 27'; Corbin-Ong (yellow card) 33'; Velázquez (yellow card) 40'; Sumareh (yellow card) 90+4' | Stadium: MBPJ Stadium; Attendance: 0 Referee: Zulkarnain Zakaria |

| 25 August 2021 19 | Petaling Jaya City | 1–4 | Kedah Darul Aman | Kelana Jaya |
| 21:00 MYT | Sukri (yellow card) 42'; Khyril 61'; Raffi (yellow card) 45+2' (yellow-red card) 70' | Report | Ataya 8'; Sherman (yellow card) 42', (goal) 56'; Prabakaran 45+2' (o.g.); Fayadh 90+3' | Stadium: MBPJ Stadium; Attendance: 0 Referee: Mohd Nafeez Abd Wahab |

| 29 August 2021 20 | Penang | 2–1 | Petaling Jaya City | George Town |
| 21:00 MYT | Casagrande 5'; Boboev 45+1'; Azwan (yellow card) 89' | Report | Sukri (yellow card) 17'; Rajes 64' | Stadium: City Stadium; Attendance: 0 Referee: Suhaizi Shukri |

| 4 September 2021 21 | Petaling Jaya City | 1–0 | UiTM | Kelana Jaya |
| 21:00 MYT | Khyril 39'; Youwarasan (yellow card) 60' | Report | | Stadium: MBPJ Stadium; Attendance: 0 Referee: Mohd Amirul Izwan Yaacob |

| 12 September 2021 22 | Selangor | 1–2 | Petaling Jaya City | Kelana Jaya |
| 21:00 MYT | Ashmawi (yellow card) 34'; Ifedayo 45+4' (pen.); Syahmi (red card) 86' | Report | Khyril 21'; Prabakaran (yellow card) 44'; Raffi (yellow card) 45+3' | Stadium: MBPJ Stadium; Attendance: 0 Referee: Muhammad Usaid Jamal |

=== Malaysia Cup ===
==== Group stage ====
The draw for the group stage was held on 15 September 2021.

| Pos | Team | Pld | W | D | L | GF | GA | GD | Pts | Qualification | JDT | SBH | PJC | KEL |
|---|---|---|---|---|---|---|---|---|---|---|---|---|---|---|
| 1 | Johor Darul Ta'zim | 6 | 6 | 0 | 0 | 14 | 1 | +13 | 18 | Quarter-finals | — | 3–0 | 1–0 | 2–0 |
| 2 | Sabah | 6 | 2 | 2 | 2 | 6 | 9 | −3 | 8 | Quarter-finals | 0–2 | — | 1–0 | 2–1 |
| 3 | Petaling Jaya City | 6 | 1 | 2 | 3 | 5 | 6 | −1 | 5 | | 1–2 | 1–1 | — | 3–1 |
| 4 | Kelantan | 6 | 0 | 2 | 4 | 4 | 13 | −9 | 2 | | 0–4 | 2–2 | 0–0 | — |

Source: MFL, FAM

| 27 September 2021 1 | Petaling Jaya City | 1–1 | Sabah | Kelana Jaya |
| 21:00 UTC +8 | Raffi (yellow card) 66'; Darren 80' | Report | Park 20'; Amri (yellow card) 90+1' | Stadium: MBPJ Stadium; Attendance: 0 Referee: Zulkarnain Zakaria |

| 30 September 2021 2 | Johor Darul Ta'zim | 1–0 | Petaling Jaya City | Iskandar Puteri |
| 21:00 UTC +8 | Cabrera 3'; Safawi (yellow card) 35'; Insa (yellow card) 39'; Davies (yellow card) 74' | Report | Kugan (yellow card) 9'; Youwarasan (yellow card) 72' | Stadium: Sultan Ibrahim Stadium; Attendance: 0 Referee: Razlan Joffri Ali |

| 29 October 2021 3 | Petaling Jaya City | 3–1 | Kelantan | Kelana Jaya |
| 21:00 UTC +8 | Darren 11', 81'; Kogileswaran 19'; Kugan (yellow card) 34'; Gurusamy (yellow card) 52' | Report | Intzidis 36', (yellow card) 90+3'; Arip (yellow card) 73' | Stadium: MBPJ Stadium; Attendance: 356; Referee: Mohamad Kamil Zakaria Ismail |

| 2 November 2021 4 | Kelantan | 0–0 | Petaling Jaya City | Kota Bharu |
| 21:00 UTC +8 | | Report | | Stadium: Sultan Muhammad IV Stadium; Attendance: 403; Referee: Hamdan Awang |

| 6 November 2021 5 | Petaling Jaya City | 1–2 | Johor Darul Ta'zim | Kelana Jaya |
| 21:00 UTC +8 | Ruventhiran 11' | Report | Bergson 14' (pen.); Maurício 28' | Stadium: MBPJ Stadium; Attendance: 1,036; Referee: Mohd Fusser Mad Sallih |

| 9 November 2021 6 | Sabah | 1–0 | Petaling Jaya City | Kota Kinabalu |
| 21:00 UTC +8 | Mitrevski 21' (pen.) | Report | | Stadium: Likas Stadium; Attendance: 3,217; Referee: Zulkarnain Zakaria |
