= 2023 Perak F.C. season =

Perak
2023 season
- Owner: XOX Berhad
- CEO: Bobie Farid Shamuddin
- Head coach: Yusri Che Lah
- Stadium: Perak Stadium
- Malaysia Super League: 11th
- Malaysia FA Cup: First round
- Malaysia Cup: Semi-finals
- Top goalscorer: League: Seo Seon-ung (3); All: Seo Seon-ung (3)
Home colours	Away colours

The 2023 season was the 103rd season in the history of Perak and their 102nd season in the top flight. The club are participating in the Malaysia Super League, Malaysia FA Cup and Malaysia Cup.

== Coaching staff ==
- Head coach: Yusri Che Lah
- Assistant head coach: Raja Azlan Shah
- Assistant coach: Saravanan Vellu
- Goalkeeper coach: Ng Wei Xian
- Fitness coach: Sam Pakiaraj
- Team doctor: Loong Cheng Wern, Ahmad Hazwan
- Physiotherapist: Mohd Noradam, Rozairen Hairudin
- Team admin: Zubir Shaharani
- Masseur: Shaffiq Mokhtar
- Kitman: Suhaimi Mohd Abidin

== Players ==
=== First-team squad ===
As of 25 February 2023

Note: Flags indicate national team as defined under FIFA eligibility rules; some limited exceptions apply. Players may hold more than one non-FIFA nationality.

No.	Pos.	Nation	Player
1	GK	(Malaysia) MAS	Bryan See Tian Keat
2	MF	(Nigeria) NGA	Sunday Afolabi
3	DF	(Malaysia) MAS	Hafizal Mohamad (captain)
4	DF	(Malaysia) MAS	Raja Imran Shah
5	MF	(Argentina) ARG	Luciano Guaycochea
6	MF	(Malaysia) MAS	Khairul Asyraf
7	FW	(Malaysia) MAS	Hadi Fayyadh
8	DF	(Malaysia) MAS	Shivan Pillay
9	FW	(Malaysia) MAS	Sunil Chandran
10	MF	(Malaysia) MAS	Syukri Baharun
11	MF	(Malaysia) MAS	Wan Zack Haikal
12	DF	(Malaysia) MAS	Afif Asyraf
14	FW	(Malaysia) MAS	Amirul Husaini
16	MF	(Malaysia) MAS	Fadhil Idris
17	MF	(Malaysia) MAS	Khairul Syafiq
19	MF	(Malaysia) MAS	Fahmi Daniel
20	FW	(Malaysia) MAS	Amirul Akmal
25	DF	(South Korea) KOR	Lee Joo-han
26	DF	(Malaysia) MAS	Haziq Puad

No.	Pos.	Nation	Player
27	FW	(Malaysia) MAS	Harith Naem
29	MF	(Malaysia) MAS	Farris Izdiham
33	DF	(Malaysia) MAS	Hasnul Zaim
36	GK	(Malaysia) MAS	Shaheeswaran Thavakumar (on loan from Negeri Sembilan)
37	DF	(South Korea) KOR	Sim Hyun-ki
39	GK	(Malaysia) MAS	Azeem Farhan
41	DF	(Malaysia) MAS	Nasrol Amri
42	DF	(Malaysia) MAS	Nazmi Ahmad
43	GK	(Malaysia) MAS	Farhan Majid
45	FW	(Malaysia) MAS	Ilham Aqil
53	DF	(Malaysia) MAS	Aris Asri
55	MF	(Malaysia) MAS	Shafizi Iqmal
66	DF	(Malaysia) MAS	Oswyn Lim
77	FW	(South Korea) KOR	Seo Seon-ung
88	MF	(Malaysia) MAS	Ikhwan Hafizo
92	MF	(Malaysia) MAS	Arif Shaqirin (on loan from Kuala Lumpur City)
93	MF	(Malaysia) MAS	Aizat Safuan
99	FW	(Nigeria) NGA	Christian Obiozor

== Transfers ==
=== Players in ===
Player	From	Fee
(Malaysia) Bryan See	(Malaysia) Melaka United	Free
(Malaysia) Hafizal Mohamad	(Malaysia) Terengganu	Free
(Malaysia) Raja Imran Shah	(Malaysia) Sarawak United	Free
(Malaysia) Hadi Fayyadh	(Japan) Fagiano Okayama	Free
(Malaysia) Shivan Pillay	(Malaysia) Petaling Jaya City	Free
(Malaysia) Sunil Chandran	(Malaysia) Petaling Jaya City	Free
(Malaysia) Syukri Baharun	(Malaysia) Melaka United	Free
(Malaysia) Fadhil Idris	(Malaysia) Melaka United	Free
(Malaysia) Haziq Puad	(Malaysia) Melaka United	Free
(Malaysia) Hasnul Zaim	(Malaysia) Sri Pahang	Free
(Malaysia) Harith Naem	(Malaysia) Melaka United	Free
(Nigeria) Christian Obiozor	(Lebanon) Tadamon Sour	Free
(Malaysia) Deevan Raj	(Malaysia) Negeri Sembilan	Free
(Malaysia) Ikhwan Hafizo	(Malaysia) Selangor II	Free
(Malaysia) Shafizi Iqmal	(Malaysia) Selangor II	Free
(Malaysia) Fahmi Daniel	(Malaysia) Selangor II	Free
(Malaysia) Amirul Husaini	(Malaysia) Johor Darul Ta'zim II	Free
(Malaysia) Faris Izdiham	(Malaysia) FAM-MSN	Free
(Malaysia) Amirul Akmal	(Malaysia) FAM-MSN	Free
(Malaysia) Felix Adriano	(Malaysia) FAM-MSN	Free
(Malaysia) Oswyn Lim	(Malaysia) Petaling Jaya City	Free

=== Players out ===
Player	To	Fee
(Malaysia) Hafiz Ramdan	(Malaysia) Sri Pahang	Loan return
(Malaysia) Randy Baruh	(Malaysia) Sabah	Loan return
(Croatia) Stipe Plazibat	Released	
(Malaysia) Indra Putra Mahayuddin	(Malaysia) Kelantan United	Free
(Malaysia) Royizzat Daud	(Malaysia) Kelantan United	Free
(Malaysia) Aqil Hilman	(Malaysia) Kelantan United	Free
(Malaysia) Farid Nezal	(Malaysia) Negeri Sembilan	Free
(Malaysia) Pavithran Selladoria	(Malaysia) Harini	Free
(Malaysia) Aidril Faqir	(Malaysia) Harini	Free
(Malaysia) Firdaus Saiyadi	(Malaysia) Kuala Lumpur City	Loan
(Malaysia) Danish Haziq	(Malaysia) Penang	Loan
(Malaysia) Syamim Yahya	Released	
(Malaysia) Zamir Selamat	Released	
(Malaysia) Idris Ahmad	Released	
(Malaysia) Ferris Danial	Released	
(Malaysia) Farid Khazali	Released	
(Malaysia) Deevan Raj	Released	

== Pre-season and friendlies ==
Win Draw Loss Cancelled Fixtures

6 January 2023 Friendly	Perak	1–2	UiTM	Ipoh
21:00 UTC+8	Amirul 30'			Stadium: Perak Stadium

13 January 2023 Friendly	Perak	1–0	ATM	Ipoh
21:00 UTC+8	Arif 86'			Stadium: Perak Stadium

28 January 2023 Friendly	Perak	0–1	Penang	Ipoh
21:00 UTC+8				Stadium: Perak Stadium

4 February 2023 Friendly	Kuala Lumpur City	3–0	Perak	Cheras
21:00 UTC+8				Stadium: Kuala Lumpur Stadium

8 February 2023 Friendly	Negeri Sembilan	2–0	Perak	Paroi
21:00 UTC+8				Stadium: Tuanku Abdul Rahman Stadium

== Competitions ==
=== Malaysia Super League ===
25 February 2023 1	Perak	1–4	Kedah Darul Aman	Ipoh
21:00 UTC+8	Ikhwan 3'; Haziq (red card) 35'; Afolabi (red card) 78'	Report	Lee Tuck 17'; Lira 66' (pen.); Ariff 84'; Balotelli 90+3'	Stadium: Perak Stadium; Attendance: 15,106; Referee: Zulkarnain Zakaria

28 February 2023 2	PDRM	0–0	Perak	Petaling Jaya
21:00 UTC+8	Norfiqrie (yellow card) 27'; Amir (yellow card) 32'; Dzulfahmi (yellow card) 38'; Suzuki (yellow card) 86'	Report	Shafizi (yellow card) 86'	Stadium: Petaling Jaya Stadium; Attendance: 2,250; Referee: Firdaus Dahlan

4 March 2023 3	Kelantan United	0–0	Perak	Kota Bharu
21:00 UTC+8	Asraff (yellow card) 45+1'; Latiff (yellow card) 90'	Report	Fadhil (yellow card) 34'; Hadi (yellow card) 57'; Shivan (yellow card) 70'	Stadium: Sultan Muhammad IV Stadium; Attendance: 964; Referee: Suhaizi Shukri

12 March 2023 4	Perak	2–0	Kuching City	Ipoh
21:00 UTC+8	Seo 42', 57'; Shivan (yellow card) 62'	Report	Alif (yellow card) 62'	Stadium: Perak Stadium; Attendance: 3,817; Referee: Mohd Fusser Mad Sallih

16 March 2023 5	Perak	0–3	Sri Pahang	Ipoh
21:00 UTC+8	Nasrol (red card) 39'	Report	Sherman 13'; Brundo 37'; Agüero (yellow card) 56'; Ingreso (yellow card) 65'; Zuhair 74'	Stadium: Perak Stadium; Attendance: 5,855; Referee: Razlan Joffri Ali

31 March 2023 6	Penang	3–1	Perak	Penang
22:00 UTC+8	Saad 6'; Nik Akif 37'; Gomes 84'	Report	Hafizal (yellow card) 57'; Seo 71'	Stadium: City Stadium; Attendance: 3,540; Referee: Razlan Joffri Ali

4 April 2023 7	Perak	0–5	Johor Darul Ta'zim	Ipoh
22:00 UTC+8	Hadi (yellow card) 38'; Lim (yellow card) 74'; Obiozor (yellow card) 77'	Report	Hasnul 5' (o.g.); Velázquez 25', 90+2'; Diogo 45'; Bergson 66'; Hong Wan (yellow card) 70'	Stadium: Perak Stadium; Attendance: 6,799; Referee: S. Logeswaran

10 April 2023 8	Kuala Lumpur City	1–0	Perak	Cheras
22:00 UTC+8	Saravanan (yellow card) 27' (yellow-red card) 64'; Avanzini 45+3'	Report	Shafizi (yellow card) 45'; Guaycochea (yellow card) 45+3'; Ikhwan (yellow card) 73'	Stadium: Kuala Lumpur Stadium; Attendance: 1,260; Referee: Khirulazuan Kidam

19 April 2023 9	Perak	1–1	Negeri Sembilan
	Alif 3'	Report

28 April 2023 10	Kelantan	2–3	Perak
		Report	Yusri 35' (o.g.); Guaycochea 45'; Suhairi 69'

20 May 2023 11	Perak	0–4	Selangor
		Report

23 May 2023 12	Sabah	3–1	Perak
		Report	Harith 83'

3 June 2023 13	Perak	0–3	Terengganu
		Report

7 June 2023 14	Kedah Darul Aman	3–0	Perak
		Report

23 June 2023 15	Perak	1–2	PDRM
	Okwuosa 73' (o.g.)	Report

7 July 2023 16	Perak	1–1	Kelantan Darul Naim
	Afolabi 9'	Report

16 July 2023 17	Kuching City	1–2	Perak
		Report	Guaycochea 13'; Seo 80'

30 July 2023 18	Sri Pahang	1–0	Perak
		Report

9 August 2023 19	Perak	3–1	Penang
	Guaycochea 5'; Zack 23'; Seo 75'	Report

13 August 2023 20	Johor Darul Ta'zim	5–0	Perak
		Report

27 August 2023 21	Perak	0–4	Kuala Lumpur City
		Report

1 October 2023 22	Negeri Sembilan	0–1	Perak
		Report	Milunović 51'

28 October 2023 23	Perak	8–0	Kelantan
	Milunović 14', 25', 33'; Zack 17'; Shivan 36'; Seo 49' (pen.), 67'; Guaycochea 84'	Report

25 November 2023 24	Selangor	4–0	Perak
		Report

3 December 2023 25	Perak	0–1	Sabah
		Report

17 December 2023 26	Terengganu	3–0	Perak
		Report

Pos	Team	Pld	W	D	L	GF	GA	GD	Pts
9	Negeri Sembilan	26	6	9	11	33	49	−16	27
10	Penang	26	6	6	14	29	50	−21	24
11	Perak	26	6	4	16	25	55	−30	22
12	Kelantan United	26	4	5	17	29	65	−36	17
13	Kuching City	26	2	6	18	24	51	−27	12

Source: MFL
Rules for classification: 1) Points; 2) Goal difference; 3) Number of goals scored.

=== Malaysia FA Cup ===
8 March 2023 First round	Perak	1–2	Sri Pahang	Ipoh
20:15 UTC+8	Hafizal (yellow card) 22'; Fadhil (yellow card) 27' (yellow-red card) 67'; Obiozor 34'; Haziq (yellow card) 62'	Report	Agüero (yellow card) 40'; Malik 82'; Brundo 90+4' (pen.)	Stadium: Perak Stadium; Attendance: 4,219; Referee: Mohamad Kamil Zakaria Ismail

== Statistics ==
=== Appearances and goals ===
No.	Pos	Nat	Player	Total		League		FA Cup		Malaysia Cup	
No.	Pos	Nat	Player	Apps	Goals	Apps	Goals	Apps	Goals	Apps	Goals
1	GK	(Malaysia) MAS	Bryan See	10	0	9	0	1	0	0	0
2	MF	(Nigeria) NGA	Sunday Afolabi	25	0	18+1	0	1	0	5	0
3	DF	(Malaysia) MAS	Hafizal Mohamad	15	0	14	0	1	0	0	0
4	DF	(Malaysia) MAS	Raja Imran Shah	19	0	12+5	0	1	0	0+1	0
5	MF	(Argentina) ARG	Luciano Guaycochea	24	7	17+2	4	0	0	5	3
6	DF	(Malaysia) MAS	Khairul Asyraf	7	0	1+3	0	0	0	0+3	0
7	MF	(Malaysia) MAS	Hadi Fayyadh	12	0	10+1	0	1	0	0	0
8	DF	(Malaysia) MAS	Shivan Pillay	30	1	23+1	1	0	0	6	0
9	FW	(Malaysia) MAS	Sunil Chandran	3	0	1+2	0	0	0	0	0
10	MF	(Malaysia) MAS	Syukri Baharun	2	0	1+1	0	0	0	0	0
11	MF	(Malaysia) MAS	Wan Zack Haikal	23	4	9+8	2	0	0	6	2
12	DF	(Malaysia) MAS	Afif Asyraf	17	0	11	0	0	0	6	0
13	MF	(Malaysia) MAS	Hadi Mohamad	3	0	3	0	0	0	0	0
14	MF	(Malaysia) MAS	Amirul Husaini	6	0	1+5	0	0	0	0	0
15	DF	(Philippines) PHI	Jesper Nyholm	14	0	9	0	0	0	5	0
16	MF	(Malaysia) MAS	Fadhil Idris	19	0	12+4	0	1	0	0+2	0
18	MF	(Malaysia) MAS	Azalinullah Alias	15	0	6+4	0	0	0	4+1	0
19	MF	(Malaysia) MAS	Fahmi Daniel	14	0	8+5	0	0+1	0	0	0
20	FW	(Malaysia) MAS	Amirul Akmal	6	0	2+4	0	0	0	0	0
21	MF	(Malaysia) MAS	Syakirin Zamri	2	0	0+2	0	0	0	0	0
23	FW	(Malaysia) MAS	Alif Zikri	13	1	10+2	1	0	0	0+1	0
24	MF	(Malaysia) MAS	Firdaus Saiyadi	10	0	3+3	0	0	0	4	0
26	DF	(Malaysia) MAS	Haziq Puad	6	0	3+2	0	1	0	0	0
27	FW	(Malaysia) MAS	Harith Naem	8	1	0+7	1	0+1	0	0	0
28	DF	(Malaysia) MAS	Fadhil Azmi	3	0	1+1	0	0	0	0+1	0
29	MF	(Malaysia) MAS	Farris Izdiham	16	0	6+4	0	1	0	1+4	0
30	MF	(Serbia) SRB	Luka Milunović	14	5	7+1	4	0	0	6	1
31	DF	(Malaysia) MAS	Che Mohamad Suhairi	16	1	6+6	1	0	0	0+4	0
33	DF	(Malaysia) MAS	Hasnul Zaim	5	0	2+3	0	0	0	0	0
36	GK	(Malaysia) MAS	Shaheeswaran Thavakumar	18	0	14	0	0	0	4	0
40	DF	(Malaysia) MAS	Aiman Khairul	15	0	8+1	0	0	0	6	0
41	DF	(Malaysia) MAS	Nasrol Amri	10	0	9	0	0+1	0	0	0
43	GK	(Malaysia) MAS	Farhan Abdul Majid	5	0	3	0	0	0	2	0
44	DF	(Malaysia) MAS	Kamal Arif	4	0	0+2	0	0	0	0+2	0
45	FW	(Malaysia) MAS	Ilham Aqil	3	0	1+2	0	0	0	0	0
51	DF	(Malaysia) MAS	Nik Umar	9	0	2+4	0	0	0	0+3	0
53	MF	(Malaysia) MAS	Aris Asri	4	0	3+1	0	0	0	0	0
55	MF	(Malaysia) MAS	Shafizi Iqmal	12	0	6+5	0	1	0	0	0
70	FW	(Malaysia) MAS	Hakimi Mat Isa	12	1	4+5	0	0	0	0+3	1
72	MF	(South Korea) KOR	Kim Kang-hyun	1	0	0+1	0	0	0	0	0
77	FW	(South Korea) KOR	Seo Seon-ung	22	7	14+2	7	0	0	6	0
88	MF	(Malaysia) MAS	Ikhwan Hafizo	15	1	11+3	1	1	0	0	0
92	MF	(Malaysia) MAS	Arif Shaqirin	4	0	3+1	0	0	0	0	0
99	MF	(Nigeria) NGA	Firdaus Fuad	1	1	0	0	0	0	0+1	1
Players sold or loaned out after the start of the season:
99	FW	(Nigeria) NGA	Christian Obiozor	11	1	4+6	0	1	1	0	0

Last updated: 17 December 2023
Source: Competitive matches
