= 2021 Malaysia Super League =

Liga Super Malaysia
- Season: 2021
- Dates: 5 March – 12 September 2021
- Champions: Johor Darul Ta'zim; 8th Super League title 8th Liga M title
- Relegated: Perak; UiTM
- AFC Champions League: Johor Darul Ta'zim
- AFC Cup: Kedah Darul Aman; Kuala Lumpur City (as 2021 Malaysia Cup winners)
- Matches: 132
- Goals: 357 (2.7 per match)
- Top goalscorer: Ifedayo Olusegun (26 goals)
- Biggest home win: 5 goals Sri Pahang 5–0 UiTM (1 May 2021); Terengganu 5–0 Perak (24 July 2021); Johor Darul Ta'zim 5–0 Perak (31 July 2021)
- Biggest away win: 6 goals Sabah 0–6 Selangor (5 September 2021)
- Highest scoring: 8 goals Perak 3–5 Penang (3 August 2021)
- Longest winning run: 11 matches Johor Darul Ta'zim
- Longest unbeaten run: 12 matches Johor Darul Ta'zim
- Longest winless run: 16 matches UiTM
- Longest losing run: 8 matches UiTM
- Total attendance: 0
- Average attendance: 0

The 2021 Malaysia Super League (Malay: Liga Super Malaysia 2021), was the 18th season of the Malaysia Super League, the top-tier professional football league in Malaysia.

The defending champions from the 2020 Malaysia Super League season, Johor Darul Ta'zim, have managed to defend their title, securing their 8th consecutive title (since 2014) on 28 August 2021 although having 2 more matches left. On the other hand, Kedah who became the runner-ups have qualified to the 2022 AFC Cup. Penang who got third was a standby team for the AFC Cup and would qualify if the winners of the 2021 Malaysia Cup went to the Johor or Kedah, but they failed to and Kuala Lumpur City who became the champions ended up taking the spot.

== Team changes ==
The following teams have changed division.

=== To Malaysia Super League ===
Promoted from Premier League

- Penang
- Kuala Lumpur

=== From Malaysia Super League ===
Relegated to Premier League

- PDRM

Disbanded Team

- FELDA United

Renamed/Rebranded Clubs

- Kedah FA separate and formed Kedah Darul Aman FC
- Selangor FA separate and formed Selangor FC
- Kuala Lumpur FA separate and formed Kuala Lumpur City FC
- Melaka United SA separate and formed Melaka United FC
- Penang FA separate and formed Penang FC
- Sabah FA separate and formed Sabah FC
- Pahang FA separate and formed Sri Pahang FC
- Perak FA separate and formed Perak FC

== Clubs locations ==
Locations of teams in the 2021 Malaysia Super League

Team	Location	Stadium	Capacity
Johor Darul Ta'zim	Iskandar Puteri	Sultan Ibrahim Stadium	40,000
Kedah Darul Aman	Alor Setar	Darul Aman Stadium	32,387
Kuala Lumpur City	Kuala Lumpur	Kuala Lumpur Stadium	18,000
Melaka United	Krubong	Hang Jebat Stadium	40,000
Penang	Penang	City Stadium	20,000
Perak	Ipoh	Perak Stadium	42,500
Petaling Jaya City	Petaling Jaya	Petaling Jaya Stadium	25,000
Sabah	Kota Kinabalu	Likas Stadium	35,000
Selangor	Petaling Jaya	Petaling Jaya Stadium	25,000
Sri Pahang	Kuantan	Darul Makmur Stadium	40,000
Terengganu	Kuala Terengganu	Sultan Mizan Zainal Abidin Stadium	50,000
UiTM	Shah Alam	UiTM Stadium	10,000

== Personnel, kit and sponsoring ==
Team	Head coach	Captain	Kit manufacturer	Main sponsor
Johor Darul Ta'zim	(Mexico) Benjamin Mora	(Malaysia) Aidil Zafuan	Nike	UNICEF
Kedah Darul Aman	(Singapore) Aidil Sharin	(Malaysia) Baddrol Bakhtiar	Lotto	Widad Langkasuka
Kuala Lumpur City	(Croatia) Bojan Hodak	(Brazil) Paulo Josué	Puma	Kuala Lumpur City
Melaka United	(Malaysia) Zainal Abidin Hassan	(Malaysia) Khairul Fahmi	Al-Ikhsan	EDRA CGN, Mamee
Penang	(Czech Republic) Tomáš Trucha	(Brazil) Endrick	Puma	Penang2030
Perak	(Malaysia) Shahril Nizam Khalil (caretaker)	(Malaysia) Hafizul Hakim	Kaki Jersi	Lenggong Valley (home) & Royal Belum (away)
Petaling Jaya City	(Malaysia) Maniam Pachaiappan	(Malaysia) Gurusamy Kandasamy	Puma	Qnet
Sabah	(Malaysia) Ong Kim Swee	(Malaysia) Rawilson Batuil	Lotto	Warisan Harta Sabah, Sabah Net
Selangor	(Germany) Karsten Neitzel	(Malaysia) Syahmi Safari	Joma	PKNS
Sri Pahang	(Malaysia) Dollah Salleh	(France) Hérold Goulon	Stallion	Aras Kuasa
Terengganu	(Malaysia) Nafuzi Zain	(Philippines) Carli de Murga	Al-Ikhsan	RedONE, Yakult
UiTM	(Malaysia) Reduan Abdullah	(France) Victor Nirennold	Puma (home & away) & Fitech (third)	MBSA

=== Coaching changes ===
Note: Flags indicate national team as has been defined under FIFA eligibility rules. Players may hold more than one non-FIFA nationality.

Team	Outgoing coach	Manner of departure	Date of vacancy	Position in table	Incoming coach	Date of appointment
Selangor	(Germany) Michael Feichtenbeiner	Redesignated to Technical Director	16 November 2020	Pre-season	(Germany) Karsten Neitzel	16 November 2020
Kuala Lumpur City	(Malaysia) Muhammad Nidzam Adzha	Redesignated to Assistant Coach	26 November 2020	Pre-season	(Chile) Simón Elissetche	26 November 2020
Petaling Jaya City	(Malaysia) K. Devan	End of contract	28 November 2020	Pre-season	(Malaysia) Maniam Pachaiappan	28 November 2020
Sabah	(Indonesia) Kurniawan Dwi Yulianto	End of contract	3 December 2020	Pre-season	(Malaysia) Lucas Kalang Laeng	3 December 2020
Penang	(Malaysia) Manzoor Azwira	Redesignated to Assistant Coach	4 December 2020	Pre-season	(Czech Republic) Tomáš Trucha	4 December 2020
Sri Pahang	(Malaysia) Dollah Salleh	Redesignated as Team Manager	3 January 2021	Pre-season	(United States) Thomas Dooley	3 January 2021
Sabah	(Malaysia) Lucas Kalang Laeng	Redesignated as backroom staff	20 December 2020	Pre-season	(Indonesia) Kurniawan Dwi Yulianto	8 January 2021
Kuala Lumpur City	(Chile) Simón Elissetche	No permit granted	8 January 2021	Pre-season	(Croatia) Bojan Hodak	9 January 2021
Perak	(Australia) Mehmet Duraković	Mutual Termination	22 February 2021	Pre-season	(Malaysia) Chong Yee Fatt	23 February 2021
Sri Pahang	(United States) Thomas Dooley	Rested	17 March 2021	9th	(Malaysia) Dollah Salleh	17 March 2021
UiTM	(Germany) Frank Bernhardt	Rested	9 April 2021	12th	(Malaysia) Reduan Abdullah	9 April 2021
UiTM	(Malaysia) Reduan Abdullah	Redesignated	29 April 2021	12th	(Germany) Frank Bernhardt	29 April 2021
Perak	(Malaysia) Chong Yee Fatt	Rested	2 Aug 2021	11th	(Malaysia) Shahril Nizam Khalil	2 Aug 2021
UiTM	(Germany) Frank Bernhardt	Sacked	9 August 2021	14th	(Malaysia) Reduan Abdullah	9 August 2021

== League table ==
Pos	Team	Pld	W	D	L	GF	GA	GD	Pts	Qualification or relegation
1	Johor Darul Ta'zim (C)	22	18	3	1	50	9	+41	57	Qualification for AFC Champions League group stage
2	Kedah Darul Aman	22	13	4	5	44	28	+16	43	Qualification for AFC Cup group stage
3	Penang	22	12	5	5	37	30	+7	41	
4	Terengganu	22	11	5	6	33	20	+13	38	
5	Selangor	22	10	6	6	45	30	+15	36	
6	Kuala Lumpur City	22	8	9	5	27	20	+7	33 (Note: KL City qualified to 2022 AFC Cup as winner of 2021 Malaysia Cup)	Qualification for AFC Cup group stage
7	Petaling Jaya City	22	6	6	10	16	28	−12	24	
8	Melaka United	22	5	9	8	25	31	−6	21 (Note: Melaka have been docked three points based on the following of the decision from FAM (Football Association of Malaysia).)	
9	Sabah	22	4	7	11	21	38	−17	19	
10	Sri Pahang	22	4	6	12	23	37	−14	18	
11	Perak (R)	22	4	4	14	20	45	−25	16	Relegation to Malaysia Premier League
12	UiTM (R)	22	3	4	15	16	41	−25	13	Relegation to Malaysia Premier League

Source: Malaysian Football League
Rules for classification: 1) Points; 2) Goal difference; 3) Number of goals scored.
(C) Champions; (R) Relegated

== Result table ==
Home \ Away	JDT	KED	KUL	MEL	PEN	PRK	PJC	SBH	SEL	PAH	TER	UiTM
Johor Darul Ta'zim		2–0	2–1	3–0	2–0	5–0	3–0	2–0	1–1	3–0	0–1	3–1
Kedah Darul Aman	0–1		3–2	4–1	4–1	1–0	3–1	2–0	2–4	3–1	1–2	3–3
Kuala Lumpur City	1–1	2–1		1–1	3–1	3–0	1–0	0–0	1–1	2–1	1–0	1–0
Melaka United	0–1	1–3	2–1		1–2	2–1	0–0	1–1	2–3	0–0	2–0	1–1
Penang	0–3	1–1	1–0	2–1		2–1	2–1	1–1	1–4	3–0	2–2	0–0
Perak	2–2	1–1	0–0	0–1	3–5		0–0	2–1	0–3	2–3	0–2	3–2
Petaling Jaya City	0–2	1–5	2–2	2–2	1–1	0–1		1–0	1–2	1–0	0–3	1–0
Sabah	1–4	0–1	1–1	3–1	0–3	2–1	0–1		0–6	2–2	2–1	4–0
Selangor	1–3	1–2	1–1	1–1	0–2	3–1	1–2	2–2		3–1	1–2	2–0
Sri Pahang	0–2	2–2	0–2	1–1	1–2	0–2	1–0	2–1	2–2		1–1	5–0
Terengganu	0–1	1–2	1–0	1–1	1–4	5–0	0–0	0–0	3–1	2–0		3–0
UiTM	0–4	0–1	1–1	0–3	0–1	2–0	0–1	4–0	0–2	1–0	1–2	

Source: MFL
Legend: Blue = home team win; Yellow = draw; Red = away team win.
For upcoming matches, an "a" indicates there is an article about the rivalry between the two participants.

== Positions by round ==
The table lists the positions of teams after each week of matches.
In order to preserve chronological evolvements, any postponed matches are not included to the round at which they were originally scheduled but added to the full round they were played immediately afterward.

Team ╲ Round	1	2	3	4	5	6	7	8	9	10	11	12	13	14	15	16	17	18	19	20	21	22
Johor Darul Ta'zim	2	1	1	1	1	1	1	1	1	1	1	1	1	1	1	1	1	1	1	1	1	1
Kedah Darul Aman	12	5	5	4	3	2	2	2	3	3	2	3	3	3	3	3	4	4	3	2	2	2
Penang	4	7	8	7	4	4	3	4	4	4	3	4	4	4	4	4	3	3	4	4	3	3
Terengganu	3	2	2	2	2	3	4	3	2	2	4	2	2	2	2	2	2	2	2	3	4	4
Petaling Jaya	8	9	3	6	5	5	5	7	7	6	6	8	8	7	7	8	8	8	8	8	8	7
Kuala Lumpur City	10	6	7	3	5	6	6	5	6	7	7	6	6	6	6	6	6	6	6	6	6	6
Selangor	1	4	4	5	7	7	7	6	5	5	5	5	5	5	5	5	5	5	5	5	5	5
Perak	7	3	6	10	8	9	8	8	9	10	10	9	10	11	11	11	11	11	11	11	11	11
Sri Pahang	11	12	11	9	11	11	9	11	11	11	11	11	9	9	10	9	9	9	10	9	10	10
Sabah	6	10	10	11	10	8	10	10	8	8	8	7	7	8	8	7	7	7	7	7	9	9
Melaka United	5	8	9	8	9	10	11	9	10	9	9	10	11	10	9	10	10	10	9	10	7	8
UiTM	9	11	12	12	12	12	12	12	12	12	12	12	12	12	12	12	12	12	12	12	12	12

Leader
Relegation to 2022 Premier League

Source: MFL

== Season statistics ==
- First goal of the season: 34 minutes and 9 seconds
  - (Malaysia) Safawi Rasid for Johor Darul Ta'zim against Kedah Darul Aman (5 March 2021)
- Fastest goal in a match: 9 seconds
  - (Brazil) Rafael Vitor for Penang against Perak (3 August 2021)
- Goal scored at the latest point in a match: 97 minutes and 59 seconds
  - (South Korea) Jang Suk-won for Melaka United against Kuala Lumpur City (31 July 2021)
- Oldest Goalscorer in a match: 41 Years Old 7 Months 15 Days
  - (Malaysia) Shukor Adan for Kuala Lumpur City against UiTM (8 May 2021)
- Most goals scored by one player in a match: 3 goals
  - (All players who got a hatrick)
- Widest winning margin: 6 goals
  - Selangor 6–0 Sabah (5 September 2021)
- Most goals in a match: 8 goals
  - Perak 3–5 Penang (3 August 2021)
- Most goals in one half: 6 goals
  - Perak vs Penang (3 August 2021) 2–4 at half time, 3–5 final
- Most goals in one half by a single team: 4 goals
  - Johor Darul Ta'zim vs Perak (31 July 2021) 1–0 at half time, 5–0 final
  - Penang vs Perak (3 August 2021) 4–2 at half time, 5–3 final
  - Selangor vs Sabah (5 September 2021) 4–0 at half time, 6–0 final

=== Top goalscorers ===
As of matches played 12 September 2021

Rank	Player	Club	Goals
1	(Bahrain) Ifedayo Olusegun	Selangor	26
2	(Brazil) Bergson da Silva	Johor Darul Ta'zim	23
3	(Liberia) Kpah Sherman	Kedah Darul Aman	13
4	(Brazil) Casagrande	Penang	12
5	(Ivory Coast) Kipré Tchétché	Kedah Darul Aman	10
5	(Brazil) Paulo Josué	Kuala Lumpur City	10
7	(Brazil) David da Silva	Terengganu	7
7	(Malaysia) Baddrol Bakhtiar	Kedah Darul Aman	7
7	(Ghana) Nana Poku	UiTM/Perak	7
10	(Switzerland) Oliver Buff	Selangor	6
10	(Tajikistan) Sheriddin Boboev	Penang	6

=== Hat-trick ===
As of matches played 12 September 2021

Player	For	Against	Result	Date
(Bahrain) Ifedayo Olusegun	Selangor	Perak	3–1 (H)	10 April 2021
(Brazil) Bergson da Silva	Johor Darul Ta'zim	Perak	5–0 (H)	31 July 2021
(Brazil) Rafael Vitor	Penang	Perak	5–3 (A)	3 August 2021
(Ghana) Nana Poku	Perak	Penang	3–5 (H)	3 August 2021
(Bahrain) Ifedayo Olusegun	Selangor	Kedah Darul Aman	4–2 (A)	14 August 2021
(Brazil) Bergson da Silva	Johor Darul Ta'zim	Sri Pahang	3–0 (H)	27 August 2021
(Bahrain) Ifedayo Olusegun	Selangor	Sabah	6–0 (A)	5 September 2021

Notes (H) – Home team (A) – Away team

=== Top assists ===
As of matches played 12 September 2021

Rank	Player	Club	Assists
1	(Ivory Coast) Kipre Tchetche	Kedah Darul Aman	14
2	(Brazil) Endrick	Penang	11
3	(Malaysia) Safiq Rahim	Johor Darul Ta'zim	8
3	(Switzerland) Oliver Buff	Selangor	8
5	(Brazil) Paulo Josué	Kuala Lumpur City	7
5	(Brazil) Casagrande	Penang	7
7	(Argentina) Gonzalo Cabrera	Johor Darul Ta'zim	6
7	(Myanmar) Hein Htet Aung	Selangor	6
7	(Mali) Makan Konate	Terengganu	6
7	(Haiti) Sony Norde	Melaka United	6

=== Clean Sheets ===
As of matches played 12 September 2021

Rank	Player	Club	Clean sheets
1	(Malaysia) Farizal Marlias	Johor Darul Ta'zim	11
2	(Malaysia) Suhaimi Husin	Terengganu	8
2	(Malaysia) Kalamullah Al-Hafiz	Petaling Jaya City	8
4	(Philippines) Kevin Ray Mendoza	Kuala Lumpur City	7
5	(Malaysia) Sam Somerville	Penang	6

=== Discipline ===
As of matches played 12 September 2021

==== Players ====
- Most yellow cards: 6
  - (Malaysia) Amirul Azhan (Perak)
  - (Malaysia) Arif Fadzilah (Terengganu)
  - (Malaysia) Azwan Aripin (Penang)
  - (Malaysia) Filemon Anyie (Petaling Jaya City)
  - (Liberia) Kpah Sherman (Kedah Darul Aman)
  - (Malaysia) Khuzaimi Piee (UiTM)
- Most red cards: 1
  - (Malaysia) Nik Shahrul (Kuala Lumpur City)
  - (Malaysia) Fadzrul Danel (Kedah Darul Aman)
  - (Brazil) Renan Alves (Kedah Darul Aman)
  - (Malaysia) Rodney Celvin Akwensivie (Kedah Darul Aman)
  - (Brazil) Casagrande (Penang)
  - (Malaysia) Khairu Azrin Khazali (Penang)
  - (Malaysia) Latiff Suhaimi (Penang)
  - (Malaysia) Raffi Nagoorgani (Petaling Jaya City)
  - (Malaysia) Maxsius Musa (Sabah)
  - (Malaysia) Ezanie Salleh (Sri Pahang)
  - (France) Hérold Goulon (Sri Pahang)
  - (Malaysia) Ashmawi Yakin (Selangor)
  - (Malaysia) Sharul Nazeem (Selangor)
  - (Malaysia) Syahmi Safari (Selangor)
  - (Malaysia) Farid Nezal (UiTM)

==== Club ====
- Most red cards: 3
  - Kedah Darul Aman
  - Penang
  - Selangor
- Most yellow cards: 4
  - Sabah

== See also ==
- 2021 Malaysia Premier League
- 2021 Malaysia M3 League
- 2021 Malaysia M4 League
- 2021 Malaysia FA Cup
- 2021 Malaysia Cup
- 2021 Malaysia Challenge Cup
- 2021 Piala Presiden
- 2021 Piala Belia
