= Jeremy Lin (disambiguation) =

Jeremy Lin (born 1988) is a Taiwanese-American basketball player.

Jeremy Lin may also refer to:

- Jeremy Atherton Lin, American writer

== See also ==
- Jeremy Linn (born 1975), American swimmer
- Jeremy Lynn or Jerry Lynn (born 1963), American professional wrestler
- Jeremy Lim (born 1988), Malaysian footballer
