= Kogileswaran Raj =

Malaysian footballer

Personal information
- Full name: Kogileswaran Raj a/l Mohana Raj
- Date of birth: 21 September 1998 (age 28)
- Place of birth: Kuala Lumpur, Malaysia
- Height: 1.68 m (5 ft 6 in)
- Positions: Winger; attacking midfielder

Team information
- Current team: Immigration FC II
- Number: 10

Youth career
- 2012: Frenz United
- 2013–2014: Malaysia Pahang Sports School
- 2015: Harimau Muda C

Senior career*
Years	Team	Apps	(Gls)
2016–2019	Sri Pahang	27	(13)
2020–2022	Petaling Jaya City	46	(8)
2023	Chungbuk Cheongju		
2023–2024	Penang	6	(0)
2024–25	Bunga Raya	24	(12)
2026–	Immigration FC II	0	(0)

International career
2013–2014	Malaysia U16	10	(2)
2015–2016	Malaysia U19	5	(0)
2017–2019	Malaysia U23	6	(0)
2018–	Malaysia	8	(2)
Medal record
Men's football
Representing Malaysia
AFF U-16 Youth Championship
Winner	2013 Myanmar
- * Club domestic league appearances and goals

Kogileswaran "Kogi" Raj a/l Mohana Raj (born 21 September 1998) is a Malaysian professional footballer who plays as a winger or attacking-midfielder. He has also been the member of the Malaysia national team.

== Club career ==
=== Sri Pahang ===
On 1 January 2016, Kogileswaran signed for a Malaysia Super League side Sri Pahang FC from Harimau Muda C on a free transfer. Under the management of Dollah Salleh, he made 27 appearances for the club and scored 13 goals for Sri Pahang from 2016 until 2019.

=== Petaling Jaya City ===
On 1 January 2020, Kogileswaran joined a fellow Malaysia Super League side Petaling Jaya City. From 2020 until 2022 season, he made 46 appearances for the club and scored 8 goals for Petaling Jaya City.

=== Chungbuk Cheongju ===
On 10 January 2023, Kogileswaran signed a one-year contract with K League 2 side Chungbuk Cheongju and became first Malaysian to play in Korean League. On 29 March 2023, he made his debut in the second round of the 2023 Korean FA Cup in the starting lineup against K4 League side Seoul Jungnang.

=== Penang ===
On 21 July 2023, Kogileswaran returned to Malaysia to join Penang.

== International career ==
=== Youth ===
In August 2013, Kogi was enlisted in Malaysia U-16 squad for the 2013 AFF U-16 Youth Championship. He made 6 appearances and scored 2 goals for Malaysia U16. Both of the goals scored against Philippines U16. Malaysia ended up being the champion of 2013 AFF U-16 Youth Championship.

From 2013 until 2014, Kogileswaran played for Malaysia U16 squad. Under the management of S. Balachandran, He made 10 appearances and scored 2 goals for Malaysia U16.

From 2015 until 2016, Kogileswaran played for Malaysia U19 squad. Under the management of Frank Bernhardt, he got selected for the squad. In those years, he made 5 appearances and didn't scored any goal for Malaysia U19.

On 23 November 2017, Kogileswaran was enlisted in Malaysia U22's 30-man provisional squad for the 2018 AFC U-23 Championship. On 10 January 2018, he made his first appearance for the Malaysia U23, coming from the bench in the 72nd minute in a 1–4 defeat to Iraq at Changshu Stadium.

In November 2020, Kogileswaran was enlisted in Malaysia U-23 squad for the 2019 Southeast Asian Games. He made 4 appearances and scored 2 goals for Malaysia U23. One is against Singapore and one against Indonesia. Malaysia U23 ended their campaign on 4th placed in the group stage.

=== Senior ===
On 27 March 2018, Kogi made his first Malaysia senior team debut against Lebanon in the 2019 AFC Asian Cup qualification after being subbed on in the 89th minute. He scored his first international goal in the 1–3 win against Cambodia in 2020 AFF Championship group stage. He also scored in the 1–4 loss against Indonesia.

== Personal life ==
He is the cousin of Titus James Palani, who was a football sensation in Malaysia during the early 2000.

== Career statistics ==
=== Club ===
As of match played 12 November 2022

Appearances and goals by club, season and competition.
Club performance			League		FA Cup		Malaysia Cup		Continental (Note: Includes cup competitions such as the AFC Champions League, and AFC Cup)		Total	
Season	Club	League	Apps	Goals	Apps	Goals	Apps	Goals	Apps	Goals	Apps	Goals
2016	Sri Pahang	Malaysia Super League	5	0	0	0	5	0	–		10	0
2017	Sri Pahang	Malaysia Super League	4	1	0	0	3	0	–		7	1
2018	Sri Pahang	Malaysia Super League	13	1	2	0	2	0	–		17	1
2019	Sri Pahang	Malaysia Super League	5	1	1	0	1	0	–		7	1
Total			27	3	3	0	11	0	0	0	41	3
2020	Petaling Jaya City	Malaysia Super League	8	4	–						8	4
2021	Petaling Jaya City	Malaysia Super League	19	2	–		0	0	–		19	2
2022	Petaling Jaya City	Malaysia Super League	19	2	–		0	0	–		19	2
Total			46	8	0	0	0	0	0	0	46	8
2023	Chungbuk Cheongju	K League 2	1	0	–						1	0
Total			1	3	0	0	0	0	0	0	1	3
Career total			74	14	3	0	11	0	0	0	88	14

=== International ===
As of match played 23 October 2022

Appearances and goals by national team and year
National team	Year	Apps	Goals
Malaysia	2018	2	0
Malaysia	2021	2	2
Malaysia	2022	4	0
Total		8	2

International goals by date, venue, opponent, score, result and competition
No.	Date	Venue	Opponent	Score	Result	Competition
1	6 December 2021	Bishan Stadium, Bishan, Singapore	Cambodia	3–0	3–1	2020 AFF Championship
2	19 December 2021	National Stadium, Kallang, Singapore	Indonesia	1–0	1–4	2020 AFF Championship

== Honours ==
Sri Pahang

- Malaysia FA Cup: 2018

Malaysia U-16

- AFF U-16 Youth Championship: 2013
