= Zainal Abidin Jamil =

Malaysian footballer

Zainal Abidin
Personal information
- Full name: Zainal Abidin bin Jamil
- Date of birth: 5 August 1999 (age 27)
- Place of birth: Bera, Pahang, Malaysia
- Height: 1.80 m (5 ft 11 in)
- Position: Centre-back

Team information
- Current team: Negeri Sembilan FC
- Number: 13

Youth career
- 2020: Felda United U21

Senior career*
Years	Team	Apps	(Gls)
2020	Felda United	0	(0)
2021–2022	Petaling Jaya City	18	(0)
2023–	Negeri Sembilan FC	53	(2)

International career^{‡}
2022	Malaysia U23		
- * Club domestic league appearances and goals as of 8 June 2026 ‡ National team caps and goals as of 20 January 2023

Zainal Abidin bin Jamil (born 5 August 1999) is a Malaysian professional footballer who plays as a centre-back for Malaysia Super League side Negeri Sembilan FC.

== Club career ==
Zainal Abidin started his youth career at FELDA United F.C. in the 2020 season before joining the PJ City President's Cup squad the following season and being absorbed by P. Maniam in the Super League competition.

=== Negeri Sembilan ===
He was officially announced as a new Negeri Sembilan FC player on 13 January 2023. For the 2025–26 season, Zainal remains with Negeri Sembilan FC for a third consecutive season following the club's official confirmation.

== Career statistics ==
=== Club ===
As of 8 June 2026

Club	Season	League			Malaysia Cup		Malaysia FA Cup		Total	
Club	Season	Division	Apps	Goals	Apps	Goals	Apps	Goals	Apps	Goals
Felda United	2020	M-Super League	0	0	0	0	0	0	0	0
Felda United	Total		0	0	0	0	0	0	0	0
Petaling Jaya City	2021	M-Super League	1	0	5	0	0	0	6	0
Petaling Jaya City	2022	M-Super League	17	0	2	0	1	0	20	0
Petaling Jaya City	Total		18	0	7	0	1	0	26	0
Negeri Sembilan	2023	M-Super League	21	2	3	0	2	0	26	2
Negeri Sembilan	2024–25	M-Super League	19	0	4	0	0	0	23	0
Negeri Sembilan	2025–26	M-Super League	13	0	3	0	0	0	16	0
Negeri Sembilan	Total		53	2	10	0	2	0	65	2
Career total			71	2	17	0	3	0	91	2
