= Raja Imran Shah =

Malaysian footballer

Personal information
- Full name: Raja Imran Shah bin Raja Amin
- Date of birth: 21 September 1998 (age 28)
- Place of birth: Kuala Lumpur, Malaysia
- Height: 1.85 m (6 ft 1 in)
- Position: Centre-back

Youth career
- 2016: KL Youth Soccer Academy
- 2017–2018: PKNS U-19
- 2019: PKNS U-21

Senior career*
Years	Team	Apps	(Gls)
2020	Selangor II		
2021	Negeri Sembilan	9	(0)
2022	Sarawak United	14	(1)
2023–2024	Perak	17	(0)
2024–2025	PDRM		
2025	Bunga Raya Damansara		
- * Club domestic league appearances and goals

Raja Imran Shah bin Raja Amin (born 21 September 1998) is a Malaysian professional footballer who plays as a centre-back.

== Early life ==
He is second out of 5 siblings, he is younger brother of actress and model Alicia Amin. He's of mixed parentage of Malay, Chinese and German descent.

== Club career ==
=== Sarawak United ===
Before the 2022 season, he signed for Sarawak United. However, he experienced unpaid payments while playing for the club. In total, he made 16 appearances, scored 2 goals and made 1 assist for Sarawak United.

=== Perak ===
On 17 November 2022, Raja Imran joined the Malaysia Super League club Perak. One of the reasons he was signed was because manager Lim Leong Kim preferred signing young Malaysian players over foreign players. After the 2023 season began, he praised the Perak fans for their passion. However, when many supporters started to question the ability of Perak manager, Lim Teong Kim, Raja Imran came to his defense.

== Style of play ==
He is known for his height and operates as a centre-back.

== Career statistics ==
=== Club ===
As of 15 November 2022

Appearances and goals by club, season and competition
Club	Season	League			Cup (Note: Malaysia FA Cup)		League Cup (Note: Malaysia Cup)		Continental		Other		Total	
Club	Season	Division	Apps	Goals	Apps	Goals	Apps	Goals	Apps	Goals	Apps	Goals	Apps	Goals
Negeri Sembilan	2021	Malaysia Premier League	9	0	–		–		–		–		9	0
Negeri Sembilan	Total		9	0	–		–		–		–		9	0
Sarawak United	2022	Malaysia Super League	14	1	0	0	2	1	–		–		16	2
Sarawak United	Total		14	1	0	0	2	1	–		–		16	2
Perak	2023	Malaysia Super League	0	0	0	0	0	0	–		–		0	0
Perak	Total		17	0	1	0	1	0	–		–		19	0
Career total			40	0	0	0	0	0	–		0	0	44	0
