= N. Thanabalan =

Active Malaysian footballer

Personal information
- Full name: Thanabalan a/l Nadarajah
- Date of birth: 25 February 1995 (age 31)
- Place of birth: Seremban, Negeri Sembilan, Malaysia
- Height: 1.73 m (5 ft 8 in)
- Positions: Forward; winger

Team information
- Current team: Harini FT
- Number: 12

Youth career
- 2013: Negeri Sembilan U-21

Senior career*
Years	Team	Apps	(Gls)
2013–2018	Negeri Sembilan	33	(6)
2017	→ Felcra (loan)	12	(5)
2019	Kedah	12	(1)
2020	→ Perak II (loan)	7	(0)
2021–2022	Sabah	5	(0)
2023-	Harini FT	0	(0)

International career^{‡}
2013	Malaysia U-19	8	(1)
2016–2018	Malaysia U-23	21	(11)
Medal record
Malaysia under-23
Sea Games
Silver medal – second place	Sea Games 2017	Football
- * Club domestic league appearances and goals as of 15 October 2022 ‡ National team caps and goals as of 20 January 2018

Thanabalan a/l Nadarajah (Malay pronunciation: [ʈhaɳa]; born 25 February 1995) is a Malaysian professional footballer who plays as forward for Malaysia M3 League side Harini FT.

== Career ==
As a child Thanabalan regularly played football at school field of Sekolah Jenis Kebangsaan Tamil, Sungai Gadut, Seremban while trained by his own father. He later furthered his education at Tunku Ismail Sports School in Johor.

In 2013, Thanabalan signed a five-year contract with Negeri Sembilan. He was listed to the senior team in 2013 season and was given the number 28 jersey. He made his debut in a 2-0 home defeat against Pahang on 22 May 2013, coming in as substitute in the 68th minute replacing Nazrin Nawi. He also featured for the Negeri Sembilan U-21 in the Malaysia President's Cup.

In 2014 Thanabalan made his first ever league start for Negeri Sembilan against DRB-Hicom on 24 January 2014. He played for 68 minutes before being replaced by Fauzi Nan.

During the 2015 season, Thanabalan was allocated the number 33 shirt. Thanabalan made his first appearance of the 2015 season as a substitute in Negeri Sembilan's opening Liga Premier match, a 1–1 draw at home against Kuantan. He made 14 appearances and scored 3 goals.

Thanabalan was loaned to FELCRA in 2017. He made his debut against Penjara FC in the 2017 Malaysia FA Cup. He made 13 appearances and scored 5 goals. He returned to Negeri Sembilan in 2018 and made 12 appearances scoring 3 goals.

In 2019, he transferred to Kedah. He made his debut in a 1-1 draw against Perak on 8 February 2019. He also won the 2019 Malaysia FA Cup and made 3 appearances in the competition.

In the 2020 season, Thanabalan was loaned to Perak II. He made his debut in a 2-2 draw against Sarawak United on 29 August 2020.

After his contract ended with Kedah, Thanabalan joined Borneo-based club Sabah and made a reunion with former Malaysia youth coach, Ong Kim Swee. He made 10 appearances in all competitions for Sabah in 2021.

In 2023 he joined second tier Malaysia M3 League side Harini FT, alongside few others ex Malaysia national team players.

== International career ==
Thanabalan was capped at youth level with Malaysia. He made 6 appearances and 4 goals in the 2017 Southeast Asian Games. He also played in the final against Thailand which Malaysia lost 0–1 due to an own goal scored by Malaysian keeper Haziq Nadzli. Thanabalan was part of the national team that qualified for the 2018 AFC U-23 Championship that took place in China and he scored 2 goals in 3 appearances during the qualification matches.

== Personal life ==
Originated from Kampung Sagga, Rantau in the state of Negeri Sembilan, Thanabalan the oldest child of S. Nadarajah, who is paralysed from the chest down following a road accident in 2013 and V. Thirusundari who is a housewife. He has a younger brother and a younger sister, Keeteswaran and Keerthikaa. His cousin, R.Sasikumar, plays for Kampung Rawa FC as a passing midfielder.

== Career statistics ==
=== Club ===
As of match played 20 November 2022

Club performance			League		Cup		League Cup		Other		Total	
Season	Club	League	Apps	Goals	Apps	Goals	Apps	Goals	Apps	Goals	Apps	Goals
Malaysia			League		FA Cup		Malaysia Cup		Other		Total	
2013	Negeri Sembilan	Malaysia Super League	2	0	0	0	0	0	–		2	0
2014	Negeri Sembilan	Malaysia Premier League	2	0	0	0	0	0	–		2	0
2015	Negeri Sembilan	Malaysia Premier League	14	3	1	0	–		1 (Note: Appearances in 2015 Piala Malaysia play-off.)	0	16	3
2016	Negeri Sembilan	Malaysia Premier League	3	0	1	0	1	0	–		5	0
2018	Negeri Sembilan	Malaysia Super League	12	3	0	0	–		0 (Note: Appearances in 2018 Malaysia Challenge Cup)	0	12	3
Total			33	6	2	0	1	0	1	0	37	6
2017	Felcra FC (loan)	Malaysia FAM League	12	5	1	0	–		–		13	5
Total			12	5	1	0	–		–		13	5
2019	Kedah	Malaysia Super League	12	1	3	0	2	0	–		17	1
Total			12	1	3	0	2	0	–		17	1
2020	Perak II	Malaysia Premier League	7	0	–		–		–		7	0
Total			7	0	–		–		–		7	0
2021	Sabah	Malaysia Super League	2	0	–		8	0	–		10	0
2022	Sabah	Malaysia Super League	3	0	1	0	2	0	–		6	0
Total			5	0	1	0	10	0	–		16	0
Career total			69	12	7	0	13	0	1	0	90	12

== Honours ==
=== Club ===
Kedah

- Malaysia FA Cup: 2019
- Malaysia Cup: Runner-up 2019

=== International ===
Malaysia U-23

- Southeast Asian Games

(silver) Silver medal: 2017
