= Syahmi Zamri =

Malaysian footballer

Personal information
- Full name: Muhammad Syahmi bin Zamri
- Date of birth: 12 May 2000 (age 26)
- Place of birth: Shah Alam, Selangor
- Height: 1.75 m (5 ft 9 in)
- Position: Forward

Team information
- Current team: Star City F.C.
- Number: 26

Youth career
- 2016–2017: Sekolah Sukan Tunku Mahkota Ismail
- 2018–2020: Felda United

Senior career*
Years	Team	Apps	(Gls)
2019–2020	Felda United	9	(1)
2021–2022	Petaling Jaya City	20	(1)
2023	Terengganu II	18	(8)
2023–2026	Terengganu	23	(1)

International career^{‡}
2018	Malaysia U19	1	(1)
Medal record
Men's football
Representing Malaysia
AFF U-19 Youth Championship
Winner	2018 Indonesia
- * Club domestic league appearances and goals as of July 2026 ‡ National team caps and goals as of 11 June 2024

Muhammad Syahmi bin Zamri (born 12 May 2000) is a Malaysian professional footballer who plays as a forward.

== Club career ==
=== Petaling Jaya City ===
Syahmi signed a contract with Petaling Jaya City in December 2020. On 21 March 2021, he made his debut for the club in a 1–0 over Sri Pahang, and scored his first goal on 12 September in a 2–1 away victory against Selangor.

== International career ==
Syahmi represented the Malaysian at the 2018 AFF U-19 Youth Championship and scored one goal along the tournament.

== Honours ==
Terengganu

- Malaysia Cup runner-up: 2023

Terengganu II

- MFL Cup: 2023

Malaysia U19

- AFF U-19 Youth Championship: 2018

== Career statistics ==
=== Club ===
As of match played 12 September 2021

Appearances and goals by club, season and competition
Club	Season	League			Cup (Note: Malaysia FA Cup)		League Cup (Note: Malaysia Cup)		Continental		Total	
Club	Season	Division	Apps	Goals	Apps	Goals	Apps	Goals	Apps	Goals	Apps	Goals
Felda United	2019	Malaysia Super League	2	0	2	0	–				4	0
Felda United	2020	Malaysia Super League	7	1	–						7	1
Felda United	Total		9	1	0	0	0	0	–	–	9	1
Petaling Jaya City	2021	Malaysia Super League	12	1	–		0	0	–		12	1
Petaling Jaya City	2022	Malaysia Super League	0	0	–		0	0	–		0	0
Petaling Jaya City	Total		12	1	0	0	0	0	–	–	12	1
Career total			21	2	2	0	0	0	–	–	23	2
