= Dendy Lowa =

Malaysian footballer

Personal information
- Full name: Dendy bin Lowa
- Date of birth: 31 May 1992 (age 34)
- Place of birth: Tenom, Sabah, Malaysia
- Height: 1.71 m (5 ft 7 in)
- Position: Defender

Team information
- Current team: Sabah
- Number: 4

Senior career*
Years	Team	Apps	(Gls)
2011–	Sabah	25	(1)
- * Club domestic league appearances and goals as of 5 May 2021

Dendy bin Lowa (born 13 May 1992) is a Malaysian professional footballer who plays as a defender for Malaysia Super League club Sabah.

== Honour ==
Sabah

- Malaysia Premier League: 2019
