= Ricco Nigel Milus =

Malaysian footballer

Personal information
- Full name: Ricco Milus
- Date of birth: 21 December 1993 (age 32)
- Place of birth: Sabah, Malaysia
- Height: 1.68 m (5 ft 6 in)
- Position: Midfielder

Team information
- Current team: Sabah
- Number: 20

Senior career*
Years	Team	Apps	(Gls)
2019–	Sabah	22	(1)
- * Club domestic league appearances and goals as of 5 May 2021

Ricco Nigel Milus (born 21 December 1993) is a Malaysian professional footballer who plays as a midfielder for Malaysia Super League club Sabah.
