= V. Ruventhiran =

Malaysian association football player

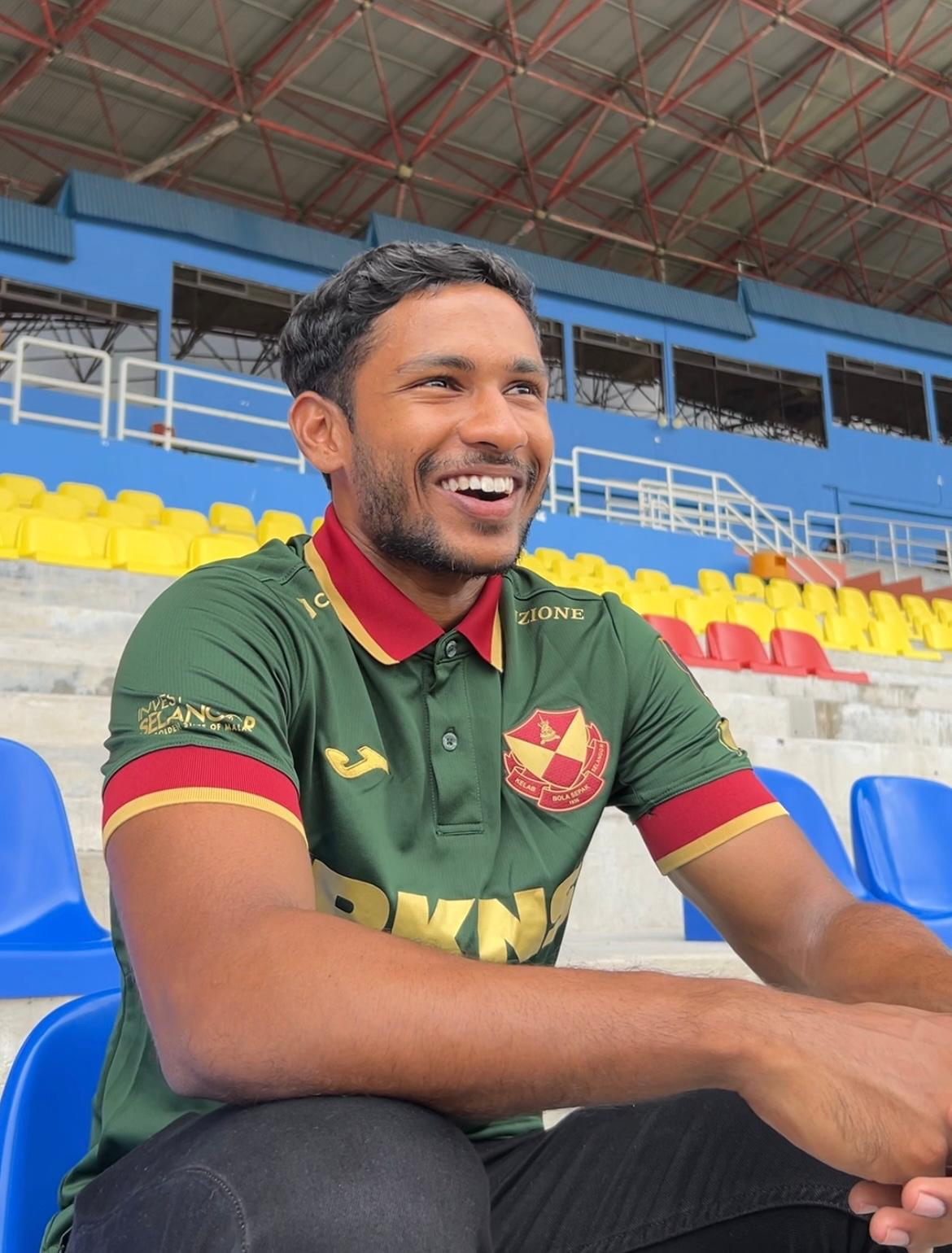
- Ruventhiran in 2024.

Personal information
- Full name: Ruventhiran a/l Vengadesan
- Date of birth: 24 August 2001 (age 25)
- Place of birth: Klang, Selangor, Malaysia
- Height: 1.75 m (5 ft 9 in)
- Position: Left-back

Team information
- Current team: Melaka
- Number: 68

Youth career
- 2008–2011: CIMB-MBSA
- 2012–2016: CIMB-YFA Bintang Muda
- 2017–2018: MISC-MIFA
- 2019–2020: Selangor III & IV

Senior career*
Years	Team	Apps	(Gls)
2021–2022	Petaling Jaya City	38	(3)
2023–2025	Selangor	13	(0)
2025–2026	Aguilas–UMak	6	(0)
2026–	Melaka	5	(0)

International career^{‡}
2022–2024	Malaysia U23	4	(1)
2022–	Malaysia	12	(0)
Medal record
Men's football
Representing Malaysia
Malaysia
King's Cup
Runner-up	2022
Malaysia U22
Merlion Cup
Winner	2023
- * Club domestic league appearances and goals ‡ National team caps and goals as of 1 August 2026

Ruventhiran a/l Vengadesan (born 24 August 2001), simply known as V. Ruventhiran, is a Malaysian professional footballer who plays as a left-back or a winger for Malaysia Super League club Melaka and the Malaysia national team.

== Club career ==
=== Early career ===
Born in Klang, Selangor, Ruventhiran began playing football at the age of 5 at a small academy. He then moved to CIMB-MBSA, CIMB-YFA, and finally he went to Bayern Munich to represent CIMB by participating in Alliance League. Ruventhiran continued his journey by joining MISC-MIFA for a year and later played for Belia Selangor before joining the Petaling Jaya City under-19 and progressing to the under-21.

=== Petaling Jaya City ===
At the end of 2020, he signed his first professional contract with the club. Ruventhiran was assigned the number 19 shirt and simultaneously made his professional and club debut on 7 March 2021 in a league match against Perak. He scored his first goal for the club in a 1–1 draw against Penang on 18 April 2021.

In two years along with the main team, he made 41 appearances and recorded two goals and three assists.

=== Selangor ===
On 18 December 2022, Ruventhiran rejoin his former club Selangor, following departure of PJ City from a part in professional football.

=== Aguilas-UMAK ===
On 12 August 2025, Ruventhiran announced that he had joined Aguilas–UMak of the Philippines Football League, marking his first stint outside Malaysia.

=== Melaka ===
In February 2026, Ruventhiran returned to Malaysia by joining Melaka, citing his wish to play football at a more competitive level and to reunite with his former under-23 national team manager E. Elavarasan.

== International career ==
=== Senior ===
On 20 May 2022, Ruventhiran was called up to join the Malaysia national team for the first time, ahead of two friendly matches against Brunei on 27 May 2022 and Hong Kong on 1 June 2022. He made his international debut for the senior team against Brunei, where he was substituted in the 62nd minute of a 4–0 win.

He was a part of the squad during the 2023 AFC Asian Cup qualifying matches, eventually helping them to qualify for the final tournament in Qatar. On 23 November 2022, he was named in Malaysia's preliminary 41-man squad for the 2022 AFF Championship, being included in the final 23-man squad for the tournament.

On 11 July 2026, Ruventhiran was called up by Malaysia interim manager Tan Cheng Hoe for the 25-man final squad list for the 2026 ASEAN Championship.

== Career statistics ==
=== Club ===
As of 19 April 2025

Club	Season	League			Cup (Note: Includes Malaysia FA Cup)		League Cup (Note: Includes Malaysia Cup)		Continental		Other		Total	
Club	Season	Division	Apps	Goals	Apps	Goals	Apps	Goals	Apps	Goals	Apps	Goals	Apps	Goals
Petaling Jaya City	2021	Malaysia Super League	16	2	0	0	5	1	—				21	3
Petaling Jaya City	2022	Malaysia Super League	22	1	2	0	1	0	—				25	1
Petaling Jaya City	Total		38	3	2	0	6	1	0	0	0	0	46	4
Selangor	2023	Malaysia Super League	10	0	1	0	2	0	—				13	0
Selangor	2024–25	Malaysia Super League	3	0	1	0	0	0	0 (Note: Appearances in AFC Champions League Two)	0	0 (Note: Appearance(s) in MFL Challenge Cup)	0	4	0
Selangor	Total		13	0	2	0	2	0	0	0	0	0	17	0
Career total			51	3	4	0	8	1	0	0	0	0	63	4

=== International ===
As of match played 10 January 2023

Appearances and goals by national team and year
National team	Year	Apps	Goals
Malaysia	2022	6	0
Malaysia	2023	3	0
Total		9	0

== Honours ==
Selangor

- Malaysia Super League runner-up: 2023
- MFL Challenge Cup: 2024-25

Malaysia U22

- Merlion Cup: 2023

Malaysia U23

- ASEAN U-23 Championship 4th Place: 2023
