= Filemon Anyie =

Malaysian footballer

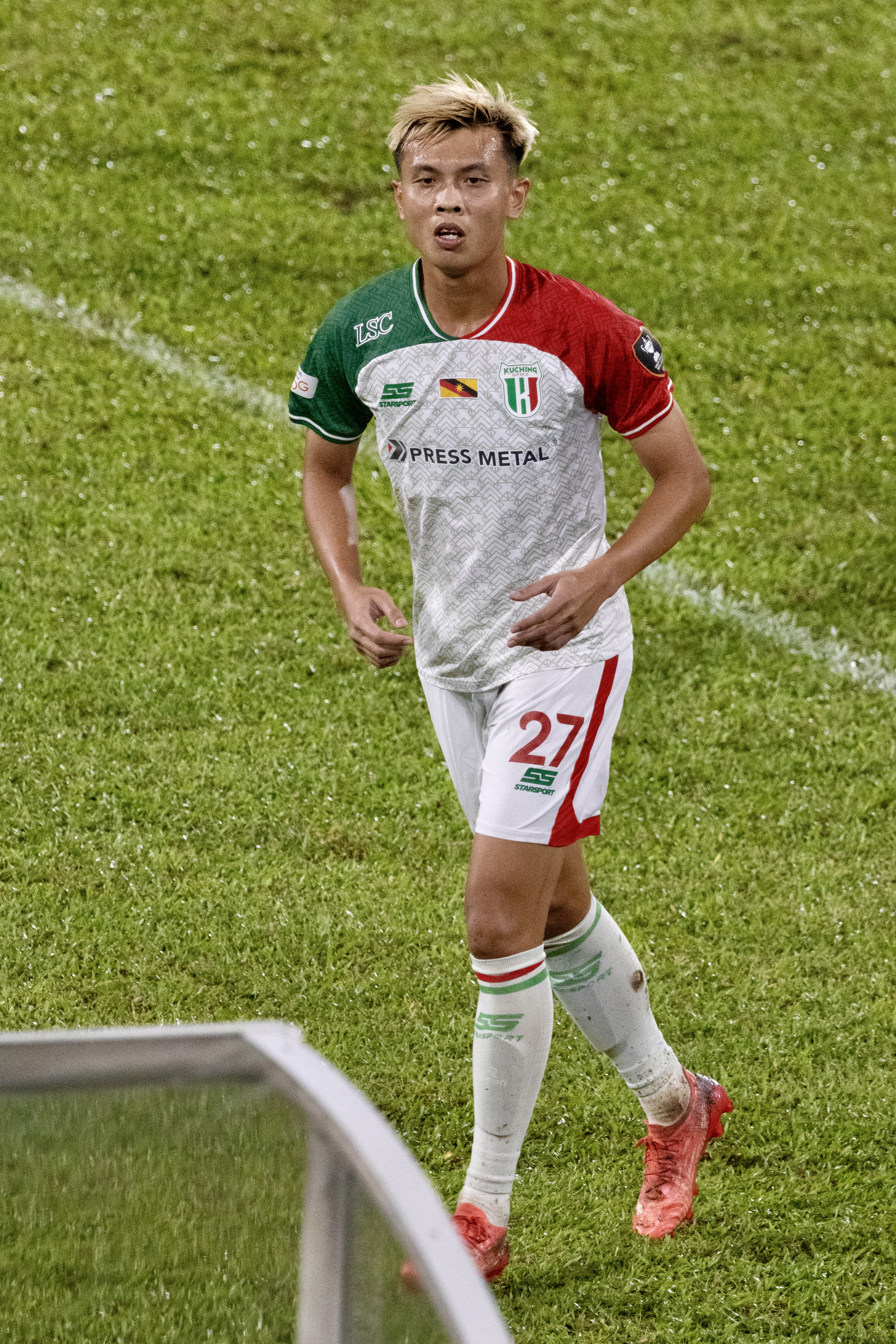
- Filemon with Kuching City in 2025

Personal information
- Full name: Filemon Anyie Standly
- Date of birth: 27 July 1997 (age 29)
- Place of birth: Long Atip, Baram, Malaysia
- Height: 1.75 m (5 ft 9 in)
- Position: Defender

Team information
- Current team: Kuching City
- Number: 27

Youth career
- 2017: Sarawak U-19
- 2018: PKNP

Senior career*
Years	Team	Apps	(Gls)
2018–2019	PKNP	15	(0)
2020–2022	Petaling Jaya City	37	(1)
2023	Negeri Sembilan	24	(1)
2024–	Kuching City	10	(0)
- * Club domestic league appearances and goals as of 16:37, August 9, 2023 (UTC)

Filemon Anyie Standly (born 27 July 1997) is a Malaysian footballer who plays for Malaysia Super League club Kuching City. Mainly operates as left-back, he also can operate as centre-back and right-back.

Born in Long Atip at Telang Usan district near to Baram; Sarawak, Filemon started his football career playing for Sarawak youth team in 2017.

== Club career ==
=== Negeri Sembilan ===
Filemon was officially announced as a new Negeri Sembilan player on 15 January 2023.

== Career statistics ==
=== Club ===
As of 23 December 2022

Club	Season	League			Cup		League Cup		Total	
Club	Season	Division	Apps	Goals	Apps	Goals	Apps	Goals	Apps	Goals
PKNP	2018	Malaysia Super League	0	0	0	0	0	0	0	0
PKNP	2019	Malaysia Super League	15	0	1	0	1	0	17	0
PKNP	Total		15	0	1	0	1	0	17	0
Petaling Jaya City	2020	Malaysia Super League	6	0	–		–		6	0
Petaling Jaya City	2021	Malaysia Super League	16	0	–		4	0	20	0
Petaling Jaya City	2022	Malaysia Super League	15	1	0	0	2	0	17	1
Petaling Jaya City	Total		37	1	0	0	6	0	43	1
Negeri Sembilan	2023	Malaysia Super League	24	1	4	0	2	0	30	1
Negeri Sembilan	Total		24	1	4	0	2	0	30	1
Kuching City	2024–25	Malaysia Super League	14	0	3	1	2	0	19	1
Kuching City	2025–26	Malaysia Super League	0	0	0	0	0	0	0	0
Kuching City	Total		14	0	3	1	2	0	19	1
Career total			0	0	0	0	0	0	0	0
