= Rendy Rining =

Malaysian footballer

Personal information
- Full name: Rendy Rining Robson
- Date of birth: 5 March 1993 (age 33)
- Place of birth: Beaufort, Malaysia
- Height: 1.86 m (6 ft 1 in)
- Position: Goalkeeper

Team information
- Current team: PDRM
- Number: 88

Senior career*
Years	Team	Apps	(Gls)
2016	Penjara	0	(0)
2017–2021	Sabah	21	(0)
2022	UiTM	5	(0)
2023	Penang	0	(0)
2024	PDRM	0	(0)
- * Club domestic league appearances and goals as of 5 September 2022

Rendy Rining Robson (born 5 March 1993) is a Malaysian professional footballer who last played as a goalkeeper for Malaysia Super League club PDRM.

Before UiTM, Rendy played for home state team Sabah F.C.

== Honour ==
Sabah

- Malaysia Premier League: 2019
