= Syukri Baharun =

Malaysian footballer

Personal information
- Full name: Mohd Syukri bin Baharun
- Date of birth: 27 February 1999 (age 27)
- Place of birth: Kunak, Sabah, Malaysia
- Height: 1.79 m (5 ft 10 in)
- Position: Midfielder

Team information
- Current team: Perak
- Number: 24

Youth career
- –2019: Sabah

Senior career*
Years	Team	Apps	(Gls)
2020–2021	Sabah	19	(0)
2022	Melaka United	15	(0)
2023–	Perak	0	(0)
- * Club domestic league appearances and goals as of 11 February 2023

Mohd Syukri bin Baharun (born 27 June 1999) is a Malaysian professional footballer who plays as a midfielder for Malaysia Super League club Perak.
