= Frank Bernhardt =

German footballer

Personal information
- Full name: Frank Bernhardt
- Date of birth: 26 August 1969 (age 57)
- Place of birth: Hamburg, Germany
- Height: 1.90 m (6 ft 3 in)
- Position: Midfielder

Team information
- Current team: Bangladesh Police (technical director)

Managerial career
- Years: Team
- 2001–2002: FC St. Pauli U19 (assistant)
- 2002–2004: FC St. Pauli II (assistant)
- 2004–2006: FC St. Pauli II
- 2007–2012: Estonia U19
- 2007–2012: Estonia U21
- 2012–2013: Kalev Tallinn
- 2014–2015: Azerbaijan (technical director)
- 2015–2017: Malaysia U23
- 2018–2019: Nomme Kalju U21
- 2020–2021: UiTM F.C.
- 2023: Kelantan (technical director)
- 2023: Kelantan
- 2024–2025: Yangon United
- 2025–: Bangladesh Police (technical director)

Frank Bernhardt (born 26 August 1969) is a German professional football manager and former player. He is the current manager of Malaysia Super League club Kelantan He managed Estonian Meistriliiga team JK Tallinna Kalev from December 2012 until the end of 2013. From February 2014 until December 2015, Bernhardt worked as technical director for the Azerbaijan Football Federation.

On 9 December 2015, he was appointed by the Football Association of Malaysia to be the head coach of the Malaysia national under-23 football team. He was removed from the position in March 2017, after the appointment of new FAM president Tunku Ismail Idris. On 21 February 2025, he was appointed technical director of Bangladesh Premier League club Bangladesh Police FC.

== Managerial statistics ==
As of match played 23 June 2023

Managerial record by team and tenure
| Team | Nat | From | To | Record | | | | |
| Team | Nat | From | To | G | W | D | L | Win % |
|---|---|---|---|---|---|---|---|---|
| FC St. Pauli II | (Germany) | 29 March 2004 | 30 June 2006 | 78 | 34 | 14 | 30 | 43.59 |
| Estonia U19 | (Estonia) | 15 February 2007 | 7 March 2012 | 49 | 10 | 7 | 32 | 20.41 |
| Estonia U21 | (Estonia) | 15 February 2007 | 31 December 2012 | 43 | 8 | 8 | 27 | 18.60 |
| Kalev | (Estonia) | 4 December 2012 | 31 December 2013 | 38 | 11 | 4 | 23 | 28.95 |
| Malaysia U23 | (Malaysia) | 7 December 2015 | 25 March 2017 | 2 | 0 | 1 | 1 | 0.00 |
| Kalju (U21) | (Estonia) | 7 August 2018 | 30 November 2018 | 14 | 1 | 2 | 11 | 7.14 |
| UiTM | (Malaysia) | 27 December 2019 | 31 March 2021 | 19 | 6 | 3 | 10 | 31.58 |
| Kelantan | (Malaysia) | 9 April 2023 | 24 June 2023 | 9 | 1 | 0 | 8 | 11.11 |
| Yangon United | (Myanmar) | 9 February 2024 | 1 July 2024 | 0 | 0 | 0 | 0 | — |
| Career Total | | | | 252 | 71 | 39 | 142 | 28.17 |
