= Leslee Jesunathan =

Malaysian association football player

Personal information
- Full name: Leslee Nathan Jesunathan
- Date of birth: 2 January 2000 (age 26)
- Place of birth: Klang, Malaysia
- Position: Winger

Team information
- Current team: Kelantan

Youth career
- Selangor U19
- Selangor United U19

Senior career*
Years	Team	Apps	(Gls)
2020	Harini	0	(0)
2021–2022	Petaling Jaya City	2	(0)
2023–	Kelantan	0	(0)
- * Club domestic league appearances and goals as of 27 August 2021

Leslee Nathan Jesunathan (born 2 January 2000) is a Malaysian footballer who plays as a winger for Kelantan.

== Club career ==
=== Petaling Jaya City ===
On 27 May 2021, Leslee made his debut for the club in a 1–4 loss to Kedah Darul Aman during Malaysia Super League match.
