= Randy Baruh =

Malaysian footballer

Personal information
- Full name: Randy Baruh Samson
- Date of birth: 19 June 1995 (age 31)
- Place of birth: Keningau, Malaysia
- Height: 1.69 m (5 ft 7 in)
- Position: Defender

Senior career*
Years	Team	Apps	(Gls)
2020–2022	Sabah	20	(0)
2022	→ Perak (loan)	7	(0)
- * Club domestic league appearances and goals as of 5 May 2022

Randy Baruh Samson (born 19 June 1995) is a Malaysian professional footballer who plays as a defender.

== Honour ==
Sabah

- Malaysia Premier League: 2019
