= Rajes Perumal =

Malaysian footballer (1985–2022)

Personal information
- Full name: Rajes a/l Perumal
- Date of birth: 21 July 1985
- Place of birth: Selangor, Malaysia
- Date of death: 17 October 2022 (aged 37)
- Place of death: Batu Caves, Selangor, Malaysia
- Height: 1.68 m (5 ft 6 in)
- Position: Right-back

Senior career*
Years	Team	Apps	(Gls)
2005	MP Selayang		
2006–2007	Sabah	?	(0)
2008	PKNS	?	(0)
2009	Shahzan Muda	?	(1)
2010–2013	PKNS	?	(1)
2014	Selangor	2	(0)
2015	Kedah	15	(0)
2016–2017	PKNS	14	(0)
2018–2022	Petaling Jaya City	74	(3)
- * Club domestic league appearances and goals as of 15 October 2022

Rajes a/l Perumal or P. Rajes (21 July 1985 – 17 October 2022) was a Malaysian professional footballer who played as a right-back.

== Career ==
In his early career, Rajes played for MP Selayang in the 2005 FAM League. He moved to Sabah in late 2006 and played for the Borneo-based team in 2006–07 season. He signed with Selangor PKNS FC in 2008 and Shahzan Muda in 2009. He returned to PKNS in 2010 and won the 2011 Malaysia Premier League title.

He transferred to Selangor in 2014 and made his debut against T-Team on 18 January 2014 coming in as substitute in the 79th minute. His second and last Super League appearance for Selangor was against Sarawak where Selangor won 3–0 where he also come in as substitute.

In 2015, he transferred to Kedah where he become a regular for the team. He made 15 league appearances in 2015 as Kedah won the Malaysia Premier League title and were promoted to the Super League. Overall he made 23 appearances for Kedah in all competition.

Rajes return to PKNS in 2016 and made his third debut with PKNS in a 4–4 draw against Kuantan FA. In 2018, he signed with MISC-MIFA (now Petaling Jaya City) and made 20 league appearances in his first season. He scored his first goal for MISC-MIFA on 22 May 2018 in a 3–2 win over Penang. His last match for the club was against Kuala Lumpur City on 15 October 2022.

== Death ==
Rajes died on 17 October 2022, after sustaining injuries in a motorcycle accident at Batu Caves, Selangor.

== Honours ==
PKNS

- Malaysia Premier League: 2011

Kedah

- Malaysia Premier League: 2015
