= Jeremy Lim =

Malaysian footballer

Personal information
- Full name: Jeremy Lim Wei Shen
- Date of birth: 27 April 1998 (age 28)
- Place of birth: Bandar Hilir, Malaysia
- Position: Centre-back

Team information
- Current team: Petaling Jaya City
- Number: 14

Youth career
- 2018: PKNP
- 2019: Petaling Jaya City

Senior career*
Years	Team	Apps	(Gls)
2020–	Petaling Jaya City	7	(0)
- * Club domestic league appearances and goals as of 12 September 2021

Jeremy Lim Wei Shen (born 27 April 1998) is a Malaysian footballer who plays for Malaysia Super League club Petaling Jaya City as a centre-back.

Jeremy began his football career with PKNP before signed with Petaling Jaya City in 2020. He also played for MIFA in 2019 where his club clinched Piala Emas Raja-Raja in 2019.
