= Maniam Pachaiappan =

Malaysian association football player and coach

P. Maniam
Personal information
- Full name: Maniam a/l Pachaiappan
- Date of birth: 6 October 1968 (age 58)
- Place of birth: Selangor, Malaysia
- Height: 1.68 m (5 ft 6 in)
- Position: Forward

Youth career
- 1987–1990: Selangor

Senior career*
| Years | Team | Apps | (Gls) |
| 1990–1998 | Selangor | 64 | (21) |

International career
| 1992–1998 | Malaysia | 26 | (4) |

Managerial career
- 2005–2007: Selangor U19
- 2007–2008: Selangor U21
- 2009–2015: Selangor (assistant coach)
- 2016–2017: Petaling Jaya Rangers
- 2017–2018: Selangor
- 2019–2020: Malaysia U16
- 2020–2022: Petaling Jaya City
- 2023: Harini
- 2024–2025: PDRM
- * Club domestic league appearances and goals

Maniam a/l Pachaiappan (born 6 October 1968) is a former Malaysian football player and head coach. He is currently coaching Malaysia Super League club PDRM.

== Managerial statistics ==
As of 21 February 2025

Managerial record by team and tenure
| Team | Nat. | From | To | Record | | | | | Ref. |
| Team | Nat. | From | To | G | W | D | L | Win % | Ref. |
|---|---|---|---|---|---|---|---|---|---|
| Petaling Jaya Rangers | (Malaysia) | 30 March 2016 | 31 October 2016 | 16 | 7 | 7 | 2 | 43.75 | |
| Selangor | (Malaysia) | 26 December 2016 | 18 March 2018 | 37 | 15 | 8 | 14 | 40.54 | |
| Petaling Jaya City | (Malaysia) | 1 February 2021 | 30 November 2022 | 66 | 17 | 21 | 28 | 25.76 | |
| Harini | (Malaysia) | 10 January 2023 | 31 December 2023 | 4 | 0 | 0 | 4 | 0.00 | |
| PDRM | (Malaysia) | 6 April 2024 | 21 February 2025 | 26 | 7 | 9 | 10 | 26.92 | |
| Career Total | | | | 149 | 46 | 45 | 58 | 30.87 | |

== Club career ==
=== Selangor ===
Born in Selangor, Maniam started his career at Selangor, playing with the youth team in 1987.

In 1991, Maniam was the only key member of the squad, and helped his team to win Malaysia FA Cup, after beating Perak in the final by 1–0.

== Coach career ==
=== Selangor ===
After guiding Selangor to win the 2006 Youth Cup and 2008 President Cup, Maniam, has been the assistant coach for the Selangor Super League squad for seven seasons from 2009 to 2015.

During the period, Maniam had twice been appointed a caretaker coach while two former coaches, K. Devan and Irfan Bakti Abu Salim resigned in mid-2011 and 2013.

=== AirAsia (now known as Petaling Jaya Rangers) ===
On 30 March 2016, Maniam became the coach of AirAsia, replacing Mohd Nidzam Jamil for the Malaysia FAM Cup club.

=== Return to Selangor ===
On 26 December 2016, Maniam returned to Selangor and been appointed as a new coach after signing a one-year contract with the club.

== Honours ==
=== Player ===
Selangor

- Malaysia FA Cup: 1991, 1997
- Malaysia Cup: 1995, 1996, 1997

=== Coach / Assistant coach ===
Selangor

- Youth Cup: Champions: 2006
- President's Cup: Champions: 2008
- Charity Shield: 2009, 2010
- Malaysia Super League: 2009, 2010
- Malaysia FA Cup: 2009
- Malaysia Cup: 2015
