= Raffi Nagoorgani =

Malaysian footballer (born 1994)

Personal information
- Full name: Mohammad Raffi bin Nagoorgani
- Date of birth: 17 June 1994 (age 32)
- Place of birth: Perak, Malaysia
- Height: 1.76 m (5 ft 9 1/2 in)
- Position: Centre-back

Team information
- Current team: Kuala Lumpur City
- Number: 5

Youth career
- 2014: Perak

Senior career*
Years	Team	Apps	(Gls)
2014–2017	Perak	32	(2)
2017	→ PKNP (loan)	7	(0)
2018	PKNP	11	(0)
2019	Felda United	15	(0)
2020	Penang	8	(0)
2021–2022	Petaling Jaya City	21	(0)
2023	Harini F.C.	15	(0)
2024–	Kuala Lumpur Rovers	22	(1)
2026–	Kuala Lumpur City	0	(0)
- * Club domestic league appearances and goals as of 12 September 2026

Mohammad Raffi bin Nagoorgani (born 17 June 1994) is a Malaysian footballer who plays as a centre-back for the Malaysia Super League club Kuala Lumpur City.

== Career ==
Raffi began his football career with the Perak youth team before being promoted to the first team squad and making his debut for the club in 2014.

In 2017, he signed a contract with PKNP on a loan deal. In the following year, he moved to the club permanently for the 2018 season.

Raffi was called to the Malaysia national under-23 squad in 2015.

== Career statistics ==
=== Club ===
As of 1 July 2018

Club	Season	League		Cup		League Cup		Continental		Total	
Club	Season	Apps	Goals	Apps	Goals	Apps	Goals	Apps	Goals	Apps	Goals
PKNP	2017	7	0	0	0	6	0	–	–	13	0
PKNP	2018	11	0	4	0	0	0	–	–	15	0
PKNP	Total	18	0	4	0	6	0	0	0	28	0
Career total		0	0	0	0	0	0	0	0	0	0

== Personal life ==
Raffi was married in January 2018.

== Honours ==
Penang

- Malaysia Premier League: 2020
