= Sunil Chandran =

Malaysian football player

Personal information
- Full name: Sunil Caven Chandran
- Date of birth: 27 September 1999 (age 27)
- Place of birth: Kuala Lumpur, Malaysia
- Height: 1.75 m (5 ft 9 in)
- Position: Winger

Youth career
- 2016–2018: PKNS U19/U21
- 2018–2020: Loughborough University FC

Senior career*
| Years | Team | Apps | (Gls) |
| 2017 | PKNS FC | | |
| 2021–2022 | Petaling Jaya City FC | 24 | (1) |
| 2023 | Perak FC | 3 | (0) |
| 2023 | → Harini F.T. (loan) | 10 | (1) |
| 2024–2025 | Bunga Raya Damansara | 12 | (1) |

International career^{‡}
| 2017–2018 | Malaysia U19 | | |
- * Club domestic league appearances and goals ‡ National team caps and goals as of 4 March 2019

Sunil Caven a/l Chandran (born 27 September 1999) is a Malaysian professional footballer who plays as a winger.
